= 1923 Wisła Kraków season =

Wisła Kraków
1923 season
- A-Klasa (Kraków): 1st
- Mistrzostwa Polski: Runner-up

The 1923 season was Wisła Kraków's 15th year as a club.

== Friendlies ==
25 February 1923	Pogoń Katowice (Poland)	1–7	(Poland) Wisła Kraków	Katowice, Poland
14:00 CEST (UTC+1)		Report	Krupa; W. Kowalski; H. Reyman	Stadium: Boisko Diany; Referee: Marian Beym (Poznań)

4 March 1923	Wisła Kraków (Poland)	5–2	(Poland) Polonia Przemyśl	Kraków, Poland
15:00 CEST (UTC+1)	H.Reyman 16', 43', ??' (pen.), ??'; W. Kowalski 49'	Report		Stadium: Stadion Wisły; Referee: Wacław Wojakowski (Kraków)

1 April 1923	Wisła Kraków (Poland)	5–1	(Poland) KS Warszawianka	Kraków, Poland
14:30 CEST (UTC+1)	H.Reyman 6', 25', 58'; W. Kowalski 37'; Kaczor 89' (pen.)	Report	Szenajch ??'	Stadium: Stadion Wisły

2 April 1923	Wisła Kraków (Poland)	3–0	(Poland) Makkabi Kraków	Kraków, Poland
14:30 CEST (UTC+1)	H. Reyman 6', (red card) 70'; W. Kowalski 17'; Krupa 76'	Report		Stadium: Stadion Wisły; Referee: Zygmunt Auerbach (Kraków)

8 April 1923	Wisła Kraków (Poland)	0–1	(Hungary) Vívó és Atlétikai Club	Kraków, Poland
		Report	Jocke 65' (pen.)	Stadium: Stadion Wisły; Attendance: 800; Referee: Zygmunt Rosenfeld (Bielsko)

3 May 1923	KS Cracovia (Poland)	1–1	(Poland) Wisła Kraków	Kraków, Poland
17:00 CEST (UTC+1)	J. Reyman 41'	Report	H. Reyman 25'	Stadium: Stadion Jutrzenki; Attendance: 7,000; Referee: Józef Lustgarten (Kraków)

8 May 1923	Legia Warsaw (Poland)	2–3	(Poland) Wisła Kraków	Warsaw, Poland
	Mielech 20'; Krawuś 60'	Report	Krupa 21', 82'; Adamek 72'	Stadium: Stadion Legii; Attendance: 3,000

10 May 1923	KS Warszawianka (Poland)	1–6	(Poland) Wisła Kraków	Warsaw, Poland
		Report	H. Reyman; S. Reyman; W. Kowalski	Stadium: Stadion Legii; Attendance: 4,000; Referee: Jerzy Grabowski (Warsaw)

12 May 1923	Toruński KS (Poland)	4–2	(Poland) Wisła Kraków	Toruń, Poland
16:00 CEST (UTC+1)	J. Cieszyński 12'; P. Gumowski 58'; Stogowski 62', 84'	Report	H. Reyman 3'; W. Kowalski 25'	Stadium: Boisko Przy Chełmińskiej; Attendance: 4,000

13 May 1923	Unia Poznań (Poland)	1–5	(Poland) Wisła Kraków	Poznań, Poland
	Maciejewski	Report		Stadium: Stadion Warty

21 May 1923	Makkabi Kraków (Poland)	1–3	(Poland) Wisła Kraków	Kraków, Poland
	Pearlmutter 13'	Report	Krupa 18', 25'; H. Reyman 70'	Stadium: Stadion Makkabi; Attendance: 2,500

May 1923	Jutrzenka Kraków (Poland)	0–0	(Poland) Wisła Kraków	Kraków, Poland
		Report

30 June 1923	Pogoń Lwów (Poland)	4–4	(Poland) Wisła Kraków	Lwów, Poland
	Batsch 22', 58', 73'; Kuchar 68'	Report	W. Kowalski 12', 20', 57'; Krupa 44'	Attendance: 5,000

1 July 1923	Czarni Lwów (Poland)	1–2	(Poland) Wisła Kraków	Lwów, Poland
	Scott 77'	Report	H. Reyman 8'; W. Kowalski 12'	Attendance: 10,000

15 July 1923	Union Łódź (Poland)	2–0	(Poland) Wisła Kraków	Łódź, Poland
	Izrael 58'; Finke 64'	Report

5 August 1923	Bielsko (Poland)	1–5	(Poland) Wisła Kraków	Bielsko, Poland
		Report	W. Kowalski 35', 67', ??'; Danz; H. Reyman	Stadium: Boisko Hakoah; Referee: Zygmunt Rosenfeld (Bielsko)

15 August 1923	Jutrzenka Kraków (Poland)	0–3	(Poland) Wisła Kraków	Kraków, Poland
		Report	Krupa; Obrubański; Adamek	Stadium: Stadion Jutrzenki; Attendance: 2,000; Referee: Jan Weyssenhoff (Wilno)

15 August 1923	Soła Oświęcim (Poland)	1–7	(Poland) Wisła Kraków	Oświęcim, Poland
		Report		Attendance: 3,000

2 September 1923	Wisła Kraków (Poland)	0–1	(Poland) 1. FC Katowice	Kraków, Poland
		Report		Stadium: Stadion Wisły

8 September 1923	Samson Tarnów (Poland)	1–1	(Poland) Wisła Kraków	Tarnów, Poland
		Report

16 September 1923	1. FC Katowice (Poland)	2–1	(Poland) Wisła Kraków	Katowice, Poland
		Report	Krupa (red card) ??'	Referee: Marian Beym (Poznań)

28 October 1923	Wisła Kraków (Poland)	2–0	(Poland) Olsza Kraków	Kraków, Poland
	Balcer ?	Report		Referee: Jakub Seidner (Kraków)

18 November 1923	Podgórze Kraków (Poland)	1–4	(Poland) Wisła Kraków	Kraków, Poland
		Report	H. Reyman; W. Kowalski; Danz	Attendance: 500

25 November 1923	KS Cracovia (Poland)	1–5	(Poland) Wisła Kraków	Kraków, Poland
14:00 CEST (UTC+1)	Węglowski 60'	Report	Czulak ??' (pen.); S. Reyman; H. Reyman; Adamek 90'	Stadium: Stadion Cracovii; Referee: Alfred Konkiewicz (Kraków)

== A-Klasa ==
11 March 1923 1	Wisła Kraków	1–0	KS Cracovia	Kraków
15:00 CEST (UTC+1)	H. Reyman 83'	Report		Stadium: Stadion Wisły; Attendance: 3,000; Referee: Zygmunt Rosenfeld (Bielsko)

17 March 1923 2	Wisła Kraków	6–0	Jutrzenka Kraków	Kraków
15:00 CEST (UTC+1)	Śliwa 33'; H. Reyman 40', 42', 45'; Krupa 81'; W. Kowalski 82'	Report		Stadium: Stadion Wisły; Referee: Wacław Wojakowski (Kraków)

25 March 1923 3	BBSV Bielsko	1–2	Wisła Kraków	Bielsko
		Report	Krupa 25'; H. Reyman ??'	Referee: Zygmunt Auerbach (Kraków)

15 April 1923 4	Wisła Kraków	4–0	Wawel Kraków	Kraków
16:30 CEST (UTC+1)	H. Reyman 5', ??'; W. Kowalski 34'; Adamek 51'	Report		Stadium: Stadion Wisły; Referee: Józef Lustgarten (Kraków)

22 April 1923 5	Wisła Kraków	4–0	Sturm Bielsko	Kraków
15:00 CEST (UTC+1)	Krupa 46'; W. Kowalski 67'; H. Reyman 86'; Gieras 87'	Report		Stadium: Stadion Wisły; Attendance: 3,000

30 April 1923 6	Wisła Kraków	2–0	BBSV Bielsko	Kraków
	Krupa 16'; Adamek 18'	Report		Stadium: Stadion Wisły

6 May 1923 7	Wawel Kraków	1–3	Wisła Kraków	Kraków
	Seichter 60'	Report	H. Reyman 65'; W. Kowalski 80'; Gieras 81'	Stadium: Stadion Jutrzenki

27 May 1923 8	KS Cracovia	4–2	Wisła Kraków	Kraków
17:00 CEST (UTC+1)	Łańko 2'; Chruściński 6', 51'; Kałuża 79'	Report	H. Reyman 56'; Gintel 88' (o.g.)	Stadium: Stadion Cracovii; Attendance: 7,630; Referee: Ignacy Zweig (Lwów)

17 June 1923 9	Jutrzenka Kraków	1–3	Wisła Kraków	Kraków
16:00 CEST (UTC+1)	Stumpfner 64'	Report	Krupa 8'; H. Reyman 76', 86'	Stadium: Boisko Jutrzenki; Referee: Wacław Wojakowski (Kraków)

24 June 1923 10	Sturm Bielsko	0–4	Wisła Kraków	Bielsko
		Report	Kaczor 10' (pen.); H. Reyman 47'; W. Kowalski 69', ??'

=== League standings ===
Pos	Team	Pld	Won	Drw	Lst	GF	GA	Pts	GD	Notes
1	Wisła Kraków	10	9	0	1	31	7	18	+24	Qualification to 1923 Polish Football Championship
2	KS Cracovia	10	8	0	2	42	6	16	+36	
3	Jutrzenka Kraków	10	3	3	4	11	19	9	-8	
4	BBSV Bielsko	10	3	3	4	9	18	9	-9	
5	Wawel Kraków	10	2	1	7	7	20	5	-13	
6	Sturm Bielsko	10	1	1	8	4	34	3	-30	Relegation to 1924 B-Klasa (Kraków)

== Mistrzostwa Polski ==
12 August 1923 1	Warta Poznań	4–2	Wisła Kraków	Poznań
17:00 CEST (UTC+1)	Staliński 24'; Einbacher 25', 51'; Niziński 73'	Report	Kosicki 42' (o.g.); H. Reyman 65'	Stadium: Boisko Warty; Attendance: 4,000; Referee: Rudolf Brzeziński (Poznań)

19 August 1923 2	Iskra Siemianowice	2–3 (0–5 wo.)	Wisła Kraków	Katowice
		Report		Stadium: Boisko Diany; Attendance: 1,000; Referee: Maurycy Schlesser (Lwów)

26 August 1923 3	ŁKS Łódź	1–6	Wisła Kraków	Łódź
	Durka 79' (pen.)	Report	W. Kowalski 49', 89'; H. Reyman 60', 75', 83', 88'	Stadium: Boisko ŁKS-u; Attendance: 5,000; Referee: Zygmunt Rosenfeld (Bielsko)

9 September 1923 4	Wisła Kraków	1–1	Warta Poznań	Kraków
16:00 CEST (UTC+1)	H. Reyman (red card) 32'; Balcer 52'	Report	Spoida 89'	Stadium: Stadion Wisły; Attendance: 6,000; Referee: Jerzy Grabowski (Warsaw)

30 September 1923 5	Wisła Kraków	1–0	ŁKS Łódź	Kraków
15:30 CEST (UTC+1)		Report		Stadium: Stadion Wisły; Attendance: 800; Referee: Wacław Wojakowski (Kraków)

7 October 1923 6	Wisła Kraków	8–3 (5–0 wo.)	Iskra Siemianowice	Kraków
15:30 CEST (UTC+1)	Krupa 11', (red card) ??'; Adamek 20', 80'; W. Kowalski 32', 49'; H. Reyman 35', 58', 72', (red card) ??'	Report	Żur (red card) ??'; Świerc (red card) ??'	Stadium: Stadion Wisły; Attendance: 500

14 October 1923 Final	Pogoń Lwów	3–0	Wisła Kraków	Lwów
	Kuchar 39', 64'; Garbień 63'	Report		Stadium: Stadion Pogoni

21 October 1923 Final	Wisła Kraków	2–1	Pogoń Lwów	Kraków
14:30 CEST (UTC+1)	H. Reyman 17'; W. Kowalski 61'	Report	Kuchar 63'	Stadium: Stadion Wisły; Attendance: 4,000

4 November 1923 Final	Pogoń Lwów	2–1	Wisła Kraków	Warsaw
	Kuchar 44'; Garbień 118'	Report	? 46'	Stadium: Agrykola; Attendance: 5,000; Referee: Artur Marczewski (Łódź)

== Squad, appearances and goals ==
No.	Pos	Nat	Player	Total		Mistrzostwa Polski	
No.	Pos	Nat	Player	Apps	Goals	Apps	Goals
	GK	(Poland) POL	Mieczysław Wiśniewski	9	0	9+0	0
	DF	(Poland) POL	Stanisław Stopa	3	0	3+0	0
	DF	(Poland) POL	Kazimierz Kaczor	9	0	9+0	0
	MF	(Poland) POL	Władysław Krupa	9	1	9+0	1
	MF	(Poland) POL	Stefan Śliwa	9	0	9+0	0
	MF	(Poland) POL	Marian Majcherczyk	7	0	7+0	0
	FW	(Poland) POL	Józef Adamek	9	1	9+0	1
	FW	(Poland) POL	Franciszek Danz	3	0	3+0	0
	FW	(Poland) POL	Henryk Reyman	9	9	9+0	9
	FW	(Poland) POL	Władysław Kowalski	8	5	8+0	5
	FW	(Poland) POL	Mieczysław Balcer	9	1	9+0	1
	DF	(Poland) POL	Michał Brzycki	1	0	1+0	0
	MF	(Poland) POL	Marian Markiewicz	7	0	7+0	0
	MF	(Poland) POL	Stefan Wójcik	7	0	7+0	0
	FW	(Poland) POL	Stefan Reyman	1	0	1+0	0

=== Goalscorers ===
Place	Position	Nation	Name	Mistrzostwa Polski
1	FW	(Poland)	Henryk Reyman	9
1	FW	(Poland)	Władysław Kowalski	5
1	FW	(Poland)	Józef Adamek	2
1	FW	(Poland)	Mieczysław Balcer	1
1	FW	(Poland)	Władysław Krupa	1
			TOTALS	18

=== Disciplinary record ===
Name	Nation	Position	Mistrzostwa Polski	Total
Name	Nation	Position	Sent off (straight red)	Sent off (straight red)
Henryk Reyman	(Poland)	FW	2	2
Władysław Krupa	(Poland)	FW	1	1
