= 1926 Wisła Kraków season =

Wisła Kraków
1926 season
- Chairman: Zygmunt Bieżeński
- A-Klasa (Kraków): 2nd
- Polish Cup: Winner

The 1926 season was Wisła Kraków's 18th year as a club.

== Friendlies ==
14 February 1926	Garbarnia Kraków (Poland)	2–8	(Poland) Wisła Kraków	Kraków, Poland
11:00 CEST (UTC+1)		Report	H. Reyman; Czulak	Stadium: Stadion Olszy

21 February 1926	Krowodrza Kraków (Poland)	1–2	(Poland) Wisła Kraków	Kraków, Poland
15:00 CEST (UTC+1)		Report	Czulak (pen.); Szpórna	Stadium: Stadion Olszy; Attendance: 600; Referee: Jakub Seidner (Kraków)

28 February 1926	Wisła Kraków (Poland)	12–0	(Poland) Olsza Kraków	Kraków, Poland
15:15 CEST (UTC+1)	H. Reyman; Czulak; Balcer ? (o.g.)	Report		Stadium: Stadion Wisły; Referee: Jakub Seidner (Kraków)

7 March 1926	Wisła Kraków (Poland)	6–1	(Poland) Zwierzyniecki KS	Kraków, Poland
15:15 CEST (UTC+1)	H. Reyman; Balcer; Czulak; W. Kowalski	Report		Stadium: Stadion Wisły

5 April 1926	Polonia Warsaw (Poland)	1–3	(Poland) Wisła Kraków	Warsaw, Poland
16:00 CEST (UTC+1)	Grabowski	Report	H. Reyman (pen.); Adamek	Stadium: Boisko Na Dynasach; Attendance: 1,000

6 April 1926	Polonia Warsaw (Poland)	2–4	(Poland) Wisła Kraków	Warsaw, Poland
		Report	Borkowski; H. Reyman; Adamek	Stadium: Boisko Na Dynasach

2 May 1926	Wisła Kraków (Poland)	6–1	(Poland) Krowodrza Kraków	Kraków, Poland
11:00 CEST (UTC+1)	H. Reyman; W. Kowalski	Report		Stadium: Stadion Wisły

3 May 1926	Wisła Kraków (Poland)	11–3	(Poland) 20 PP Ziemi Krakowskiej	Kraków, Poland
15:00 CEST (UTC+1)	W. Kowalski; Włodek; Czulak; Balcer	Report	H. Reyman; Niemiński	Stadium: Stadion Wisły

13 May 1926	Wisła Kraków (Poland)	4–0	(Poland) Jutrzenka Kraków	Kraków, Poland
11:00 CEST (UTC+1)	W. Kowalski; J. Reyman; Czulak	Report		Stadium: Stadion Wisły; Referee: Maksymilian Schneider (Kraków)

23 May 1926	Pogoń Lwów (Poland)	3–1	(Poland) Wisła Kraków	Lwów, Poland
17:00 CEST (UTC+1)	Kuchar 2', 3'; Batsch 55' (pen.)	Report	H. Reyman 88'	Stadium: Stadion Pogoni

24 May 1926	Pogoń Lwów (Poland)	1–1	(Poland) Wisła Kraków	Lwów, Poland
16:00 CEST (UTC+1)	Batsch 90' (pen.)	Report	H. Reyman 52'; Balcer (red card) ??'	Stadium: Stadion Pogoni; Referee: Władysław Szyba (Lwów)

29 May 1926	Wisła Kraków (Poland)	5–1	(Poland) Sparta Kraków	Kraków, Poland
17:30 CEST (UTC+1)		Report		Stadium: Stadion Wisły

3 June 1926	Wisła Kraków (Poland)	2–1	(Poland) Diana Katowice	Kraków, Poland
15:15 CEST (UTC+1)	H. Reyman	Report		Stadium: Stadion Wisły; Referee: Jakub Seidner (Kraków)

25 June 1926	Wisła Kraków (Poland)	4–0	(Poland) Podgórze Kraków	Kraków, Poland
17:30 CEST (UTC+1)	W. Kowalski; Czulak	Report		Stadium: Stadion Wisły

8 August 1926	Polonia Przemyśl (Poland)	1–3	(Poland) Wisła Kraków	Przemyśl, Poland
	Dobrzański	Report	Czulak; Żelazny

15 August 1926	Hasmonea Lwów (Poland)	4–1	(Poland) Wisła Kraków	Lwów, Poland
17:00 CEST (UTC+1)	Hoch 15'; Skrynkowicz 22' (o.g.); Steuermann 61'; Redler 81'	Report	Balcer 74'	Stadium: Boisko Hasmonei; Attendance: 2,000; Referee: Marian Bilor (Lwów)

22 August 1926	Jutrzenka Kraków (Poland)	1–2	(Poland) Wisła Kraków	Kraków, Poland
17:00 CEST (UTC+1)	Barmherzig	Report	Adamek; Czulak

29 August 1926	Wisła Kraków (Poland)	7–0	(Poland) 06 Mysłowice	Kraków, Poland
16:30 CEST (UTC+1)	H. Reyman; W. Kowalski; Czulak	Report		Stadium: Stadion Wisły; Referee: Maksymilian Schneider (Kraków)

11 September 1926	KS Warszawianka (Poland)	2–7	(Poland) Wisła Kraków	Warsaw, Poland
	Zwierz 22' (pen.); Jung 35'	Report	Adamek 15'; W. Kowalski 16', ??'; H. Reyman ??', ??'; Czulak ??', ??'

12 September 1926	KS Warszawianka (Poland)	1–10	(Poland) Wisła Kraków	Warsaw, Poland
		Report	Czulak; W. Kowalski; H. Reyman; Żelazny; Adamek

2 October 1926	Jutrzenka Kraków (Poland)	0–4	(Poland) Wisła Kraków	Kraków, Poland
15:30 CEST (UTC+1)		Report	J. Reyman; Żelazny	Stadium: Boisko Jutrzenki; Referee: Emil Niedźwirski (Lwów)

3 October 1926	Wisła Kraków (Poland)	3–0	(Poland) Kolejarz 24 Katowice	Kraków, Poland
15:30 CEST (UTC+1)	J. Reyman 27', ??'; W. Kowalski ??' (pen.)	Report		Stadium: Stadion Wisły

9 October 1926	Wisła Kraków (Poland)	4–2	(Poland) Pogoń Lwów	Kraków, Poland
15:15 CEST (UTC+1)	H. Reyman; Czulak; W. Kowalski	Report	Garbień; Zimmer	Stadium: Stadion Wisły

10 October 1926	Wisła Kraków (Poland)	0–0	(Poland) Pogoń Lwów	Kraków, Poland
15:15 CEST (UTC+1)		Report		Stadium: Stadion Wisły; Attendance: 2,000

17 October 1926	Wisła Kraków (Poland)	2–4	(Poland) 1. FC Katowice	Kraków, Poland
15:15 CEST (UTC+1)	W. Kowalski	Report	Kossok; Görlitz; Joschke	Stadium: Stadion Wisły; Attendance: 1,500

31 October 1926	Wisła Kraków (Poland)	9–1	(Poland) Olsza Kraków	Kraków, Poland
14:00 CEST (UTC+1)	H. Reyman; J. Krupa; Adamek; Dobrowolski	Report	Duźniak	Stadium: Stadion Wisły; Attendance: 800

1 November 1926	Makkabi Kraków (Poland)	1–7	(Poland) Wisła Kraków	Kraków, Poland
		Report	H. Reyman; Czulak; W. Kowalski	Stadium: Stadion Makkabi

7 November 1926	1. FC Katowice (Poland)	6–3	(Poland) Wisła Kraków	Katowice, Poland
	Joschke; R. Kossok; Heidenreich; K. Kossok	Report	Czulak; H. Reyman	Attendance: 2,000

21 November 1926	Garbarnia Kraków (Poland)	4–4	(Poland) Wisła Kraków	Kraków, Poland
	Zapała; Mazur; Kiliński (o.g.)	Report	Adamek; W. Kowalski	Stadium: Stadion Garbarni; Attendance: 2,000

24 November 1926	Wisła Kraków (Poland)	11–1	(Poland) Reprezentacja AGH	Kraków, Poland
14:15 CEST (UTC+1)	W. Kowalski; H. Reyman; Czulak; Adamek	Report	J. Reyman	Stadium: Stadion Wisły; Referee: Adam Obrubański (Kraków)

28 November 1926	Kolejarz 24 Katowice (Poland)	0–3	(Poland) Wisła Kraków	Katowice, Poland
		Report	W. Kowalski; Adamek; Czulak

5 December 1926	Tarnovia Tarnów (Poland)	2–2	(Poland) Wisła Kraków	Tarnów, Poland
	Śledź	Report	W. Kowalski

== A-Klasa ==
21 March 1926 1	Wisła Kraków	1–2	KS Cracovia	Kraków
15:15 CEST (UTC+1)	H. Reyman 29'	Report	Kubiński 55', 64'	Stadium: Stadion Wisły; Attendance: 5,000; Referee: Zygmunt Rosenfeld (Bielsko)

1 April 1926 2	Wawel Kraków	0–5	Wisła Kraków	Kraków
11:00 CEST (UTC+1)		Report	Balcer; J. Reyman; H. Reyman	Stadium: Stadion Cracovii; Referee: Andrzej Rutkowski (Kraków)

11 April 1926 3	Jutrzenka Kraków	1–2	Wisła Kraków	Kraków
11:45 CEST (UTC+1)	Krumholz	Report	H. Reyman; Czulak	Stadium: Stadion Jutrzenki; Referee: Jakub Seidner (Kraków)

25 April 1926 4	BBSV Bielsko	1–2	Wisła Kraków	Bielsko
16:15 CEST (UTC+1)	Matzner 43'	Report	H. Reyman 21'; J. Reyman 76'	Referee: Andrzej Rutkowski (Kraków)

16 May 1926 5	Wisła Kraków	2–1	Wawel Kraków	Kraków
	Balcer 12'; H. Reyman 37'	Report	Węglowski	Stadium: Stadion Wisły; Referee: Zygmunt Rosenfeld (Bielsko)

13 June 1926 6	Makkabi Kraków	3–4	Wisła Kraków	Kraków
17:15 CEST (UTC+1)	Kling 15', 89'; Selinger ??'	Report	H. Reyman ??'; Balcer ??', 86'; Czulak 46'	Stadium: Stadion Makkabi; Attendance: 3,000; Referee: Andrzej Rutkowski (Kraków)

20 June 1926 7	KS Cracovia	3–2	Wisła Kraków	Kraków
17:15 CEST (UTC+1)	Wójcik 30'; Sperling 33'; Kubiński 79'	Report	W. Kowalski 10'; Czulak 64'	Stadium: Stadion Cracovii; Attendance: 6,000; Referee: Zygmunt Rosenfeld (Bielsko)

27 June 1926 8	Wisła Kraków	2–1	BBSV Bielsko	Kraków
16:30 CEST (UTC+1)	H. Reyman; J. Reyman	Report	Mączka	Stadium: Stadion Wisły; Attendance: 1,000

18 July 1926 9	Wisła Kraków	3–0	Jutrzenka Kraków	Kraków
17:30 CEST (UTC+1)	H. Reyman	Report		Stadium: Stadion Wisły; Referee: Andrzej Rutkowski (Kraków)

1 August 1926 10	Wisła Kraków	7–0	Makkabi Kraków	Kraków
17:00 CEST (UTC+1)	H. Reyman; W. Kowalski; Balcer	Report		Stadium: Stadion Wisły; Attendance: 2,000

=== League standings ===
Pos	Team	Pld	Won	Drw	Lst	GF	GA	Pts	GD	Notes
1	KS Cracovia	10	10	0	0	46	11	20	+35	Qualification to 1926 Polish Football Championship
2	Wisła Kraków	10	8	0	2	30	12	16	+18	
3	Wawel Kraków	10	4	0	6	14	24	8	-10	
4	BBSV Bielsko	10	3	1	6	12	19	7	-7	
5	Jutrzenka Kraków	10	2	2	6	7	21	6	-14	
6	Makkabi Kraków	10	1	1	8	14	36	3	-22	

== Polish Cup ==
29 June 1926 Quarterfinal	ŁKS Łódź	0–2 (0–3 wo.)	Wisła Kraków	Łódź
		Report	H. Reyman 33'; Balcer 65'	Referee: Janusz Mallow (Poznań)

4 July 1926 Semifinal	Wisła Kraków	1–0	Ruch Hajduki Wielkie	Kraków
17:00 CEST (UTC+1)	W. Kowalski 68'	Report		Stadium: Stadion Wisły

5 September 1926 Final	Wisła Kraków	2–1	Sparta Lwów	Kraków
11:15 CEST (UTC+1)	W. Kowalski 10' (pen.); H. Reyman 89'	Report	Dmytrow 30'	Stadium: Stadion Wisły; Attendance: 1,500; Referee: Andrzej Rutkowski (Kraków)

== Squad, appearances and goals ==
No.	Pos	Nat	Player	Total		Polish Cup	
No.	Pos	Nat	Player	Apps	Goals	Apps	Goals
	GK	(Poland) POL	Jan Ketz	3	0	3+0	0
	DF	(Poland) POL	Aleksander Pychowski	3	0	3+0	0
	DF	(Poland) POL	Emil Skrynkowicz	2	0	2+0	0
	MF	(Poland) POL	Stefan Wójcik	3	0	3+0	0
	MF	(Poland) POL	Jan Kotlarczyk	3	0	3+0	0
	MF	(Poland) POL	Karol Bajorek	1	0	1+0	0
	FW	(Poland) POL	Józef Adamek	3	0	3+0	0
	FW	(Poland) POL	Stanisław Czulak	3	0	3+0	0
	FW	(Poland) POL	Henryk Reyman	2	2	2+0	2
	FW	(Poland) POL	Stefan Reyman	1	0	1+0	0
	FW	(Poland) POL	Mieczysław Balcer	3	1	3+0	1
	FW	(Poland) POL	Władysław Krupa	1	0	1+0	0
	FW	(Poland) POL	Jan Reyman	1	0	1+0	0
	FW	(Poland) POL	Władysław Kowalski	2	2	2+0	2
	FW	(Poland) POL	Kazimierz Kaczor	1	0	1+0	0
	MF	(Poland) POL	Witold Gieras	1	0	1+0	0

=== Goalscorers ===
Place	Position	Nation	Name	Polish Cup
1	FW	(Poland)	Henryk Reyman	2
1	FW	(Poland)	Władysław Kowalski	2
1	FW	(Poland)	Mieczysław Balcer	1
			Total	5
