= 1925 Wisła Kraków season =

Wisła Kraków
1925 season
- Chairman: Aleksander Dembiński
- Manager: Imre Schlosser (until 30 August 1925)
- Mistrzostwa Polski: 3rd
- Polish Cup: Promotion (3rd Round)

The 1925 season was Wisła Kraków's 17th year as a club.

== Friendlies ==
1 February 1925	Zwierzyniecki KS (Poland)	1–4	(Poland) Wisła Kraków	Kraków, Poland
		Report

8 February 1925	Wisła Kraków (Poland)	12–0	(Poland) Korona Kraków	Kraków, Poland
11:00 CEST (UTC+1)		Report		Stadium: Stadion Wisły; Attendance: 200

15 February 1925	Wisła Kraków (Poland)	4–1	(Poland) Krowodrza Kraków	Kraków, Poland
15:00 CEST (UTC+1)	Balcer; S. Reyman	Report		Stadium: Stadion Wisły; Attendance: 1,000; Referee: Maksymilian Schneider (Kraków)

22 February 1925	Wisła Kraków (Poland)	1–0	(Poland) Krowodrza Kraków	Kraków, Poland
		Report		Stadium: Stadion Wisły

22 February 1925	Wisła Kraków (Poland)	10–0	(Poland) Podgórze Kraków	Kraków, Poland
15:00 CEST (UTC+1)		Report		Stadium: Stadion Wisły; Attendance: 700; Referee: Stanisław Ziemiański (Kraków)

1 March 1925	Wisła Kraków (Poland)	3–2	(Poland) 1. FC Katowice	Kraków, Poland
		Report		Stadium: Stadion Wisły; Attendance: 2,000

8 March 1925	1. FC Katowice (Poland)	3–3	(Poland) Wisła Kraków	Katowice, Poland
		Report	Balcer; Pohl (o.g.)	Attendance: 1,000

15 March 1925	Wisła Kraków (Poland)	5–1	(Poland) Ruch Hajduki Wielkie	Kraków, Poland
	H. Reyman 9' (pen.), 40'; Bajorek 12', ??'; Balcer ??'	Report	? 48'	Stadium: Stadion Wisły; Attendance: 2,000

22 March 1925	Wisła Kraków (Poland)	10–3	(Poland) BBSV Bielsko	Kraków, Poland
11:30 CEST (UTC+1)	H. Reyman 3', 20', ??' (pen.), ??', ??', 81'; Balcer 39', 63'; W. Kowalski 42', 52'	Report		Stadium: Stadion Wisły; Attendance: 1,000

12 April 1925	Wisła Kraków (Poland)	1–0	(Czechoslovakia) Nuselský SK	Kraków, Poland
16:30 CEST (UTC+1)	J. Reyman 85'	Report		Stadium: Stadion Wisły; Referee: Jakub Seidner (Kraków)

13 April 1925	Wisła Kraków (Poland)	2–2	(Czechoslovakia) Nuselský SK	Kraków, Poland
16:30 CEST (UTC+1)	W. Kowalski; J. Reyman	Report		Stadium: Stadion Wisły; Referee: Andrzej Rutkowski (Kraków)

April 1925	Wisła Kraków (Poland)	1–0	(Poland) Urania Kraków	Kraków, Poland
16:00 CEST (UTC+1)		Report		Stadium: Stadion Wisły

25 April 1925	Wisła Kraków (Poland)	2–5	(Austria) SK Slovan Wien	Kraków, Poland
16:45 CEST (UTC+1)	W. Kowalski 44'; Czulak 68' (pen.)	Report	? 15'; Hanel 17'; Stepán 29'; Zdarsky 54'; Eckl 69'	Stadium: Stadion Wisły; Attendance: 1,500; Referee: Andrzej Rutkowski (Kraków)

26 April 1925	Wisła Kraków (Poland)	0–1	(Austria) SK Slovan Wien	Kraków, Poland
16:45 CEST (UTC+1)		Report	Stepán 58'	Stadium: Stadion Wisły

3 May 1925	Wisła Kraków (Poland)	5–5	(Poland) KS Cracovia	Kraków, Poland
17:00 CEST (UTC+1)	H. Reyman 27', 56', 67', 79'; Balcer 62'	Report	Chruściński 15', 34'; Ciszewski 31', 37'; Kubiński 43'	Stadium: Stadion Wisły; Attendance: 4,000; Referee: Zygmunt Rosenfeld (Bielsko)

17 May 1925	Klub Turystów Łódź (Poland)	3–0	(Poland) Wisła Kraków	Łódź, Poland
	Walkowski 7', 12'; Hermans 17'	Report		Attendance: 2,000; Referee: Zygmunt Otto (Łódź)

21 May 1925	Wisła Kraków (Poland)	2–3	(Czechoslovakia) AFK Vršovice	Kraków, Poland
17:00 CEST (UTC+1)	J. Reyman 26'; H. Reyman ??' (pen.)	Report	Bureš ??'; Bejbl 65'; Hallinger 74'	Stadium: Stadion Wisły; Attendance: 2,500; Referee: Andrzej Rutkowski (Kraków)

23 May 1925	Hasmonea Lwów (Poland)	1–1	(Poland) Wisła Kraków	Lwów, Poland
15:30 CEST (UTC+1)	Steuermann 30'	Report	J. Reyman 90'	Stadium: Boisko 19 Pułku Piechoty Odsieczy Lwowa; Referee: Marian Bilor (Lwów)

24 May 1925	Czarni Lwów (Poland)	3–3	(Poland) Wisła Kraków	Lwów, Poland
	Chmielowski 15', 32'; Sawka 60'	Report	H. Reyman 4' (pen.); J. Reyman 10', 23'	Stadium: Boisko 19 Pułku Piechoty Odsieczy Lwowa; Attendance: 2,000; Referee: Maurycy Schlesser (Lwów)

7 June 1925	BBSV Bielsko (Poland)	0–1	(Poland) Wisła Kraków	Bielsko, Poland
		Report	Parafiański

28 June 1925	Wawel Kraków (Poland)	2–3	(Poland) Wisła Kraków	Kraków, Poland
11:00 CEST (UTC+1)	Seichter ??', ??'	Report	H. Reyman ??' (pen.), ??', 46'	Stadium: Stadion Jutrzenki; Attendance: 1,000; Referee: Jakub Seidner (Kraków)

9 August 1925	Wisła Kraków (Poland)	0–1	(Czechoslovakia) ŠK Slavia Košice	Kraków, Poland
		Report		Stadium: Stadion Wisły; Attendance: 500

16 August 1925	Wisła Kraków (Poland)	2–1	(Poland) Czarni Lwów	Kraków, Poland
17:30 CEST (UTC+1)	Czulak ??'; H. Reyman ??' (pen.)	Report	Chmielowski 47'	Stadium: Stadion Jutrzenki; Referee: Jakub Seidner (Kraków)

23 August 1925	Pogoń Lwów (Poland)	4–1	(Poland) Wisła Kraków	Lwów, Poland
10:00 CEST (UTC+1)	Garbień 36'; Kuchar 41', ??'; Kotlarczyk ??' (o.g.)	Report	S. Reyman ??'	Stadium: Boisko na Cytadeli; Attendance: 1,500; Referee: Karl Fischer (Austria)

30 August 1925	Wisła Kraków (Poland)	5–0	(Poland) Warta Poznań	Kraków, Poland
16:30 CEST (UTC+1)	H. Reyman 13', 35' (pen.), 89'; Balcer 60'; Adamek 62'	Report		Stadium: Stadion Wisły; Attendance: 1,000; Referee: Andrzej Rutkowski (Kraków)

9 September 1925	Krowodrza Kraków (Poland)	3–3	(Poland) Wisła Kraków	Kraków, Poland
16:00 CEST (UTC+1)		Report	Mikuła; J. Reyman	Stadium: Stadion Wisły; Referee: Jakub Seidner (Kraków)

11 September 1925	Polonia Warsaw (Poland)	2–4	(Poland) Wisła Kraków	Warsaw, Poland
16:30 CEST (UTC+1)	Grabowski 15'; Tupalski ??'	Report	Czulak 1'; J. Reyman ??', ??', ??'	Stadium: Park Sobieskiego; Attendance: 3,000

12 September 1925	Pogoń Lwów (Poland)	2–0	(Poland) Wisła Kraków	Warsaw, Poland
	Kuchar	Report

20 September 1925	Olsza Kraków (Poland)	2–7	(Poland) Wisła Kraków	Kraków, Poland
11:00 CEST (UTC+1)		Report	H. Reyman; Adamek; J. Reyman; Czulak	Stadium: Stadion Olszy

27 September 1925	Wisła Kraków (Poland)	2–0	(Poland) Garbarnia Kraków	Kraków, Poland
15:30 CEST (UTC+1)	? ??' (pen.); Bajorek	Report		Stadium: Stadion Wisły

3 October 1925	Kolejarz 24 Katowice (Poland)	3–1	(Poland) Wisła Kraków	Katowice, Poland
15:00 CEST (UTC+1)	Gajzler (pen.); Mucha	Report	Kaczor (pen.)	Stadium: Boisko KKS-u; Attendance: 2,000

11 October 1925	Wisła Kraków (Poland)	5–0	(Poland) Pogoń Lwów	Kraków, Poland
15:15 CEST (UTC+1)	J. Reyman 19'; H. Reyman 30', 40', 68'; Czulak 83'	Report		Stadium: Stadion Wisły; Attendance: 3,000; Referee: Jakub Seidner (Kraków)

15 November 1925	Wisła Kraków (Poland)	8–1	(Poland) 3 Pułk Strzelców Podhalańskich	Kraków, Poland
11:15 CEST (UTC+1)	J. Reyman; Kramer; Czulak; Balcer; Gieras; Kotlarczyk	Report		Stadium: Stadion Wisły; Attendance: 1,000

22 November 1925	Wisła Kraków (Poland)	5–0	(Poland) Podgórze Kraków	Kraków, Poland
14:15 CEST (UTC+1)	H. Reyman; J. Reyman; Kotlarczyk (pen.); Żelazny (pen.)	Report		Stadium: Stadion Wisły; Referee: Jakub Seidner (Kraków)

29 November 1925	Wisła Kraków (Poland)	5–1	(Poland) 20 PP Ziemi Krakowskiej	Kraków, Poland
14:15 CEST (UTC+1)	J. Reyman; Balcer; Czulak	Report	H. Reyman	Stadium: Stadion Wisły

== Mistrzostwa Polski ==
29 March 1925 1	ŁKS Łódź	2–1	Wisła Kraków	Łódź
	Lange 20', 50'	Report	Adamek 76'	Attendance: 2,000

5 April 1925 2	AKS Królewska Huta	4–3 (0–3 wo.)	Wisła Kraków	Królewska Huta
	Duda 26'; Mikisch 62'; Klosek 78', 79'	Report	H. Reyman 65' (pen.), 85'; Czulak 80'	Attendance: 4,000; Referee: Marian Bilor (Lwów)

19 April 1925 3	Wisła Kraków	5–2 (3–0 wo.)	AKS Królewska Huta	Kraków
16:30 CEST (UTC+1)	W. Kowalski 22', 89'; H. Reyman 28', 72'; S. Reyman 90'	Report		Stadium: Stadion Wisły; Attendance: 4,000; Referee: Maurycy Schlesser (Lwów)

10 May 1925 4	Wisła Kraków	3–1	ŁKS Łódź	Kraków
	H. Reyman 39'; Balcer 67'; Krupa 69'	Report	Ałaszewski 83'	Stadium: Stadion Wisły; Attendance: 2,000; Referee: Marian Bilor (Lwów)

11 June 1925 Play-Off	ŁKS Łódź	3–6	Wisła Kraków	Lwów
	Lange 37'; Durka 44', 67'	Report	H. Reyman 10', 23', 77'; Adamek 70'; Czulak 78'; W. Kowalski 89'	Stadium: Stadion Czarnych; Attendance: 4,000; Referee: Maurycy Schlesser (Lwów)

14 June 1925 Final Round	Pogoń Lwów	1–0	Wisła Kraków	Lwów
17:00 CEST (UTC+1)	Batsch 14' (pen.)	Report		Stadium: Stadion Pogoni; Attendance: 3,500; Referee: Stefan Loth (Warsaw)

21 June 1925 Final Round	Wisła Kraków	1–2	Warta Poznań	Kraków
16:15 CEST (UTC+1)	Balcer 61'	Report	Staliński 39'; Szmyt 63'	Stadium: Stadion Wisły; Attendance: 1,500

12 July 1925 Final Round	Wisła Kraków	0–1	Pogoń Lwów	Kraków
18:00 CEST (UTC+1)		Report	Kuchar 2'	Stadium: Stadion Wisły; Attendance: 3,000; Referee: Zygmunt Rosenfeld (Bielsko)

== Polish Cup ==
18 October 1925 First Round	Wisła Kraków	2–0	Zwierzyniecki KS	Kraków
15:00 CEST (UTC+1)	Adamek 75'; H. Reyman 87'	Report		Stadium: Stadion Wisły; Referee: Jakub Seidner (Kraków)

25 October 1925 Second Round	Wisła Kraków	9–0	BBSV Bielsko	Kraków
14:30 CEST (UTC+1)	J. Reyman 20', 22'; Balcer ??'; H. Reyman ??', 58', 71', 87'; Adamek ??'; Czulak ??'	Report		Stadium: Stadion Wisły; Referee: Stanisław Ziemiański (Kraków)

8 November 1925 Third Round	Wisła Kraków	4–0	Wawel Kraków	Kraków
14:15 CEST (UTC+1)	H. Reyman 48'; Czulak 50', 54'; Adamek 90'	Report		Stadium: Stadion Wisły; Attendance: 1,000; Referee: Zygmunt Rosenfeld (Bielsko)

== Squad, appearances and goals ==
No.	Pos	Nat	Player	Total		Mistrzostwa Polski		Polish Cup	
No.	Pos	Nat	Player	Apps	Goals	Apps	Goals	Apps	Goals
	GK	(Poland) POL	Marian Kiliński	2	0	2+0	0	0+0	0
	DF	(Poland) POL	Kazimierz Kaczor	11	0	9+0	0	2+0	0
	DF	(Poland) POL	Marian Markiewicz	8	0	8+0	0	0+0	0
	MF	(Poland) POL	Stefan Wójcik	7	0	7+0	0	0+0	0
	MF	(Poland) POL	Witold Gieras	11	0	9+0	0	2+0	0
	MF	(Poland) POL	Władysław Krupa	5	1	4+0	1	1+0	0
	FW	(Poland) POL	Józef Adamek	12	6	9+0	3	3+0	3
	FW	(Poland) POL	Stanisław Czulak	11	5	9+0	2	2+0	3
	FW	(Poland) POL	Henryk Reyman	12	17	9+0	11	3+0	6
	FW	(Poland) POL	Władysław Kowalski	5	3	5+0	3	0+0	0
	FW	(Poland) POL	Mieczysław Balcer	11	4	8+0	3	3+0	1
	MF	(Poland) POL	Jan Kotlarczyk	11	0	8+0	0	3+0	0
	GK	(Poland) POL	Tadeusz Łukiewicz	10	0	7+0	0	3+0	0
	FW	(Poland) POL	Stefan Reyman	3	1	3+0	1	0+0	0
	DF	(Poland) POL	Aleksander Pychowski	4	0	1+0	0	3+0	0
	MF	(Poland) POL	Karol Bajorek	2	0	1+0	0	1+0	0
	MF	(Poland) POL	Mieczysław Strychalski	1	0	0+0	0	1+0	0
	FW	(Poland) POL	Jan Reyman	2	2	0+0	0	2+0	2
	MF	(Poland) POL	Michał Brzycki	1	0	0+0	0	1+0	0

=== Goalscorers ===
Place	Position	Nation	Name	Mistrzostwa Polski	Polish Cup	Total
1	FW	(Poland)	Henryk Reyman	11	6	17
2	FW	(Poland)	Józef Adamek	3	3	6
3	FW	(Poland)	Stanisław Czulak	2	3	5
4	FW	(Poland)	Mieczysław Balcer	3	1	4
5	FW	(Poland)	Władysław Kowalski	3	0	3
6	FW	(Poland)	Jan Reyman	0	2	2
7	FW	(Poland)	Stefan Reyman	1	0	1
7	FW	(Poland)	Władysław Krupa	1	0	1
			Totals	24	15	39
