= 1922 Wisła Kraków season =

Wisła Kraków
1922 season
- A-Klasa (Kraków): 2nd

The 1922 season was Wisła Kraków's 14th year as a club.

== Friendlies ==
12 March 1922	Makkabi Kraków (Poland)	1–0	(Poland) Wisła Kraków	Kraków, Poland
	Perlmutter	Report		Stadium: Stadion Makkabi; Referee: Zygmunt Auerbach (Kraków)

8 April 1922	Wisła Kraków (Poland)	4–2	(Poland) Pogoń Lwów	Kraków, Poland
16:00 CEST (UTC+1)	Olearczyk 49' (o.g.); W. Kowalski 58', 84'; Adamek 62'	Report	Gulicz 38' (pen.); Batsch 66'	Stadium: Stadion Wisły; Attendance: 5,000; Referee: Karl Fischer (Austria)

16 April 1922	Makkabi Kraków (Poland)	1–2	(Poland) Wisła Kraków	Kraków, Poland
	? 42' (pen.)	Report	Marcinkowski 12'; Szpórna 29'	Stadium: Stadion Makkabi; Attendance: 1,000

7 May 1922	Wisła Kraków (Poland)	1–3	(Czechoslovakia) Viktoria Žižkov	Kraków, Poland
17:30 CEST (UTC+1)	Szpórna 5'	Report	Kriz 8' ? 20'; Jelinek 56'	Stadium: Stadion Wisły; Referee: Zygmunt Auerbach (Kraków)

8 May 1922	Wisła Kraków (Poland)	1–3	(Czechoslovakia) Viktoria Žižkov	Kraków, Poland
17:30 CEST (UTC+1)	Danz 87'	Report	Hoyer 6', 12'; Meres 49'	Stadium: Stadion Wisły; Referee: Stanisław Ziemiański (Kraków)

4 June 1922	Warta Poznań (Poland)	1–5	(Poland) Wisła Kraków	Poznań, Poland
	Prymka 25'	Report	W. Kowalski 34', 56'; Danz 55', 67'; H. Reyman 73'	Attendance: 2,000; Referee: Marian Beym (Katowice)

5 June 1922	Warta Poznań (Poland)	2–2	(Poland) Wisła Kraków	Poznań, Poland
	Schmidt 19'; Kosicki 59' (pen.)	Report	Śliwa 11'; W. Kowalski 75'	Referee: Janusz Mallow (Poznań)

27 June 1922	Wisła Kraków (Poland)	6–0	(Poland) Warta Poznań	Kraków, Poland
	W. Kowalski 22', 40', 75', 87'; Mróz 28'; Szpórna 82'	Report		Stadium: Stadion Wisły; Referee: Zygmunt Auerbach (Kraków)

June 1922	WKS 16 PP Tarnów (Poland)	1–1	(Poland) Wisła Kraków	Tarnów, Poland
		Report

1 July 1922	Pogoń Lwów (Poland)	5–1	(Poland) Wisła Kraków	Lwów, Poland
17:30 CEST (UTC+1)	Słonecki 17'; Garbień 25', 52', 79'; Kuchar 77'	Report	Gieras 12'	Stadium: Stadion Pogoni; Attendance: 3,000; Referee: Longin Dudryk (Lwów)

2 July 1922	Polonia Warsaw (Poland)	4–4	(Poland) Wisła Kraków	Lwów, Poland
17:30 CEST (UTC+1)	Grabowski 28' (pen.); J. Loth 73'; Hermans 75'; Emchowicz 85'	Report	H. Reyman 18', 25', 77'; W. Kowalski 61' (pen.)	Stadium: Stadion Pogoni; Attendance: 7,000; Referee: Franciszek Engel (Lwów)

3 July 1922	Resovia (Poland)	2–2	(Poland) Wisła Kraków	Rzeszów, Poland
	Heublum 18', 34'	Report	W. Kowalski 35'; Szpórna 60'	Attendance: 3,000; Referee: Jakub Seidner (Kraków)

8 July 1922	Wisła Kraków (Poland)	1–2	(Czechoslovakia) Slavia Moravská Ostrava	Kraków, Poland
17:30 CEST (UTC+1)	Szpórna 18'	Report	Balas II 86' ? 89'	Stadium: Stadion Wisły

9 July 1922	Wisła Kraków (Poland)	5–1	(Czechoslovakia) Slavia Moravská Ostrava	Kraków, Poland
17:30 CEST (UTC+1)	S. Reyman 20', 89'; Szpórna 73'; H. Reyman 74', 78'	Report	Balas II 57'	Stadium: Stadion Wisły; Referee: Józef Lustgarten (Kraków)

16 July 1922	Wisła Kraków (Poland)	4–3	(Poland) Czarni Lwów	Kraków, Poland
17:30 CEST (UTC+1)	S. Reyman 16'; H. Reyman 68', 77', 87'	Report	Wyżykowski 28'; Lachowicz 51'; Kopeć 64'	Stadium: Stadion Wisły

22 July 1922	Wisła Kraków (Poland)	7–0	(Poland) Strzelec Wilno	Kraków, Poland
	S. Reyman 2', 53'; Szpórna 24'; Marcinkowski 29'; Kaczor 39'; W. Kowalski 48', 68'	Report		Stadium: Stadion Wisły

23 July 1922	Czarni Lwów (Poland)	0–1	(Poland) Wisła Kraków	Lwów, Poland
17:30 CEST (UTC+1)		Report	Gieras 69'	Stadium: Boisko TZR

30 July 1922	ŁKS Łódź (Poland)	3–0	(Poland) Wisła Kraków	Łódź, Poland
	A. Kubik 75'; Lange 78' (pen.); Kowalczyk 82'	Report		Attendance: 5,000

July 1922	Makkabi Kraków (Poland)	1–1	(Poland) Wisła Kraków	Kraków, Poland
		Report

13 August 1922	Wisła Kraków (Poland)	0–5	(Austria) Hakoah Wien	Kraków, Poland
		Report	Nemes 2', 24'; Gansl 30', 45'; Grünwald 87'	Stadium: Stadion Wisły; Attendance: 8,000; Referee: Zygmunt Auerbach (Kraków)

15 August 1922	Tarnovia Tarnów (Poland)	0–2	(Poland) Wisła Kraków	Tarnów, Poland
		Report	Szpórna 33'; Danz 77'

20 August 1922	Strzelec Białystok (Poland)	2–11	(Poland) Wisła Kraków	Białystok, Poland
		Report

27 August 1922	Makkabi Kraków (Poland)	1–0	(Poland) Wisła Kraków	Kraków, Poland
	Heim 82'	Report

2 September 1922	Slovan Moravská Ostrava (Czechoslovakia)	2–2	(Poland) Wisła Kraków	Moravská Ostrava, Czechoslovakia
		Report

3 September 1922	Slavia/Slovan Moravská Ostrava (Czechoslovakia)	2–0	(Poland) Wisła Kraków	Moravská Ostrava, Czechoslovakia
		Report

10 September 1922	Czarni Lwów (Poland)	1–4	(Poland) Wisła Kraków	Lwów, Poland
16:00 CEST (UTC+1)	T. Kowalski 65' (pen.)	Report	W. Kowalski 4'; S. Reyman 6'; H. Reyman 11' (pen.), 50'	Stadium: Boisko TZR; Referee: Maurycy Schlesser (Lwów)

23 September 1922	Wisła Kraków (Poland)	3–1	(Czechoslovakia) SK Pardubice	Kraków, Poland
	S. Reyman 65'; W. Kowalski 69'; Danz 85'	Report	Meissner II 59'	Stadium: Stadion Wisły

15 October 1922	Legia Warsaw (Poland)	0–3	(Poland) Wisła Kraków	Warsaw, Poland
		Report	Potocki; Krupa	Stadium: Boisko WKS-u; Referee: Józef Strzelecki (Lwów)

24 October 1922	SK Pardubice (Czechoslovakia)	4–2	(Poland) Wisła Kraków	Pardubice, Czechoslovakia
		Report

25 October 1922	Klub Turystów Łódź/ŁTS-G (Poland)	2–1	(Poland) Wisła Kraków	Łódź, Poland
15:30 CEST (UTC+1)		Report	Marcinkowski

28 October 1922	SK Náchod (Czechoslovakia)	2–3	(Poland) Wisła Kraków	Náchod, Czechoslovakia
		Report

== A-Klasa ==
19 March 1922 1	Wisła Kraków	5–3	Sturm Bielsko	Kraków, Poland
15:00 CEST (UTC+1)	Danz 16'; Szpórna 25'; H. Reyman 49', 66'; W. Kowalski 69' (pen.)	Report		Stadium: Stadion Makkabi; Attendance: 1,500; Referee: Zygmunt Rosenfeld (Bielsko)

2 April 1922 2	Wisła Kraków	1–1	KS Cracovia	Kraków, Poland
14:30 CEST (UTC+1)	Danz 58'	Report	Kotapka 57'	Stadium: Stadion Makkabi; Attendance: 1,500; Referee: Adam Obrubański (Kraków)

9 April 1922 3	Jutrzenka Kraków	0–5	Wisła Kraków	Kraków, Poland
17:15 CEST (UTC+1)		Report	Szpórna 8', 80'; W. Kowalski 43', 82'; H. Reyman 72'	Stadium: Stadion Cracovii

23 April 1922 4	BBSV Bielsko	0–4	Wisła Kraków	Bielsko, Poland
		Report	W. Kowalski 26', 86'; H. Reyman 32', 76'	Referee: Jakub Seidner (Kraków)

30 April 1922 5	Makkabi Kraków	0–0	Wisła Kraków	Kraków, Poland
		Report

21 May 1922 6	Wisła Kraków	5–0	Makkabi Kraków	Kraków, Poland
16:00 CEST (UTC+1)	H. Reyman 47'; W. Kowalski 49', 81'; Danz 52'; Szpórna 83'	Report		Stadium: Stadion Wisły; Referee: Adam Obrubański (Kraków)

11 June 1922 7	Sturm Bielsko	0–2	Wisła Kraków	Bielsko, Poland
		Report	Szpórna 55'; W. Kowalski 75'	Stadium: Stadion BBSV

18 June 1922 8	Wisła Kraków	3–0	Jutrzenka Kraków	Kraków, Poland
	Szpórna 21'; W. Kowalski 46'; Kaczor 86'	Report		Referee: Adam Obrubański (Kraków)

25 June 1922 9	KS Cracovia	2–1	Wisła Kraków	Kraków, Poland
17:00 CEST (UTC+1)	Chruściński 50'; Kogut 65'	Report	W. Kowalski 67'	Stadium: Stadion Cracovii; Attendance: 8,000

29 June 1922 10	Wisła Kraków	1–1	BBSV Bielsko	Kraków, Poland
	W. Kowalski 59'	Report	Stürmer 75'	Stadium: Stadion Wisły; Referee: Ignacy Zweig (Lwów)

=== League standings ===
Pos	Team	Pld	Won	Drw	Lst	GF	GA	Pts	GD	Notes
1	KS Cracovia	10	8	1	1	34	6	17	+28	Qualification to 1922 Polish Football Championship
2	Wisła Kraków	10	6	3	1	27	7	15	+20	
3	BBSV Bielsko	10	3	3	4	13	20	9	-7	
4	Jutrzenka Kraków	10	3	2	5	11	19	8	-8	
5	Sturm Bielsko	10	3	1	6	13	25	7	-12	
6	Makkabi Kraków	10	1	2	7	8	29	4	-21	Relegation to 1923 B-Klasa (Kraków)

== Notable players ==
- (Poland) Henryk Reyman
