= 1924 Wisła Kraków season =

Wisła Kraków
1924 season
- Chairman: Aleksander Dembiński
- Manager: Imre Schlosser (From 24 August 1924)
- A-Klasa (Kraków): 1st

The 1924 season was Wisła Kraków's 16th year as a club.

== Friendlies ==
16 March 1924	Jutrzenka Kraków (Poland)	2–13	(Poland) Wisła Kraków	Kraków, Poland
11:00 CEST (UTC+1)		Report	H. Reyman; W. Kowalski; Czulak; Adamek	Stadium: Stadion Jutrzenki; Attendance: 1,000

22 March 1924	Makkabi Kraków (Poland)	1–1	(Poland) Wisła Kraków	Kraków, Poland
15:30 CEST (UTC+1)	Goldfliess	Report	Czulak 62'	Stadium: Stadion Jutrzenki; Attendance: 2,000; Referee: Józef Lustgarten (Kraków)

30 March 1924	AKS Królewska Huta (Poland)	6–3	(Poland) Wisła Kraków	Królewska Huta, Poland
		Report		Attendance: 2,000; Referee: Edmund Kosicki (Poznań)

6 April 1924	Polonia Warsaw (Poland)	2–5	(Poland) Wisła Kraków	Warsaw, Poland
	Tupalski 10'; Grabowski 15'	Report	H. Reyman 35', 70'; Balcer 37'; Czulak ??', 80' (pen.)	Stadium: Park Sobieskiego; Attendance: 6,000; Referee: Jan Bednarski (Warsaw)

10 April 1924	Pogoń Lwów (Poland)	2–4	(Poland) Wisła Kraków	Lwów, Poland
		Report

13 April 1924	ŁKS Łódź (Poland)	0–3	(Poland) Wisła Kraków	Łódź, Poland
		Report	H. Reyman 35', 50', 85'; Adamek (red card) ??'	Attendance: 3,000; Referee: Zygmunt Hanke (Łódź)

21 April 1924	Wisła Kraków (Poland)	4–0	(Weimar Republic) Berliner SV 1892	Kraków, Poland
17:00 CEST (UTC+1)	Balcer; Czulak	Report		Stadium: Stadion Wisły

22 April 1924	Wisła Kraków (Poland)	2–2	(Austria) SK Slovan Wien	Kraków, Poland
	H. Reyman 7'; Kaczor 75'; Balcer 77'	Report	Eckl 26' ? 87'	Stadium: Stadion Wisły; Attendance: 2,500

27 April 1924	Wisła Kraków (Poland)	3–1	(Hungary) Budapesti TC	Kraków, Poland
	W. Kowalski 31', 70'; Balcer 32'	Report	? 19'	Stadium: Stadion Wisły; Attendance: 1,500; Referee: Józef Lustgarten (Kraków)

3 May 1924	Wisła Kraków (Poland)	3–1	(Weimar Republic) DSV Troppau	Kraków, Poland
15:00 CEST (UTC+1)	Czulak 10'; H. Reyman 36', ??'	Report	Reichman 31'	Stadium: Stadion Wisły

11 May 1924	KS Cracovia (Poland)	0–2	(Poland) Wisła Kraków	Kraków, Poland
		Report	Wójcik; Czulak 81'	Stadium: Stadion Cracovii; Attendance: 6,000; Referee: Andrzej Rutkowski (Kraków)

18 May 1924	Warta Poznań (Poland)	1–1	(Poland) Wisła Kraków	Poznań, Poland
	Przybysz 88'	Report	Majcherczyk 18'	Stadium: Boisko Warty; Attendance: 2,000; Referee: Rudolf Brzeziński (Poznań)

25 May 1924	Hasmonea Lwów (Poland)	1–2	(Poland) Wisła Kraków	Lwów, Poland
17:00 CEST (UTC+1)	Steuermann 75'; Schneider (red card) ??'	Report	S. Reyman 30', (red card) ??'; Czulak 32'	Stadium: Boisko Hasmonei; Attendance: 2,000; Referee: Marian Bilor (Lwów)

29 May 1924	Wisła Kraków (Poland)	1–1	(Poland) ŁKS Łódź	Kraków, Poland
17:30 CEST (UTC+1)	S. Reyman	Report	Fejer	Stadium: Stadion Wisły

1 June 1924	Wisła Kraków (Poland)	2–0	(Hungary) Vívó és Atlétikai Club	Kraków, Poland
17:30 CEST (UTC+1)	W. Kowalski; Danz	Report		Stadium: Stadion Wisły; Referee: Andrzej Rutkowski (Kraków)

7 June 1924	Wisła Kraków (Poland)	1–1	(Poland) Wilja Wilno	Kraków, Poland
16:45 CEST (UTC+1)		Report		Referee: Wacław Wojakowski (Kraków)

8 June 1924	Wisła Kraków (Poland)	2–2	(Austria) SK Admira Wien	Kraków, Poland
17:30 CEST (UTC+1)	S. Reyman; Czulak	Report		Stadium: Stadion Wisły; Attendance: 5,000

14 June 1924	Wisła Kraków (Poland)	2–3	(Czechoslovakia) Makkabi Brno	Kraków, Poland
	Balcer 32'; W. Kowalski 78'	Report	Siklóssy; Nikolsburger	Stadium: Stadion Wisły; Attendance: 3,000

21 June 1924	Polonia Przemyśl (Poland)	0–7	(Poland) Wisła Kraków	Przemyśl, Poland
		Report	H. Reyman; Balcer; Czulak; W. Kowalski

22 June 1924	Czarni Lwów (Poland)	3–4	(Poland) Wisła Kraków	Lwów, Poland
16:00 CEST (UTC+1)	Wochanka 15'; J. Kopeć 57'; Chmielowski 88' (pen.)	Report	H. Reyman 13', 31'; W. Kowalski 28', 48'	Stadium: Boisko Czarnych

5 July 1924	Wisła Kraków (Poland)	1–4	(Czechoslovakia) SK Slavia Prague	Kraków, Poland
		Report		Stadium: Stadion Wisły; Attendance: 1,500; Referee: Józef Lustgarten (Kraków)

6 July 1924	Wisła Kraków (Poland)	1–2	(Czechoslovakia) SK Slavia Prague	Kraków, Poland
	H. Reyman 39'	Report	Štapl 38', 88'	Stadium: Stadion Wisły; Attendance: 5,000; Referee: Józef Lustgarten (Kraków)

9 July 1924	Wisła Kraków (Poland)	1–3	(Denmark) Akademisk Boldklub	Kraków, Poland
	Czulak 71'	Report		Stadium: Stadion Wisły; Attendance: 1,000

22 July 1924	Wisła Kraków (Poland)	1–2	(Austria) SK Rapid Wien	Kraków, Poland
	Reyman 3'	Report	Wesely 4'; Richter 36'	Stadium: Stadion Wisły; Attendance: 2,500

27 July 1924	Wisła Kraków (Poland)	2–4	(Austria) SC Wacker Wien	Kraków, Poland
	Jan Kotlarczyk 27'; H. Reyman ??'	Report		Stadium: Stadion Wisły; Referee: Józef Lustgarten (Kraków)

30 August 1924	Wisła Kraków (Poland)	0–0	(Poland) 20 PP Ziemi Krakowskiej	Kraków, Poland
15:45 CEST (UTC+1)		Report		Stadium: Stadion Wisły
Note: Match abandoned after 35 minutes due to heavy rain.

16 November 1924	Wisła Kraków (Poland)	2–3	(Poland) Pogoń Lwów	Kraków, Poland
11:45 CEST (UTC+1)	Czulak 12'; H. Reyman 60'	Report	Słonecki 8'; Batsch 14', 73'	Stadium: Stadion Wisły; Attendance: 2,500; Referee: Andrzej Rutkowski (Kraków)

== A-Klasa ==
3 August 1924 1	Wisła Kraków	4–0	BBSV Bielsko	Kraków
16:00 CEST (UTC+1)	H. Reyman 13', 62'; Czulak 14', 50'	Report		Stadium: Stadion Wisły; Attendance: 800; Referee: Adam Obrubański (Kraków)

15 August 1924 2	Jutrzenka Kraków	0–5	Wisła Kraków	Kraków
16:45 CEST (UTC+1)		Report	Markiewicz 42' (pen.); H. Reyman 51', 70'; Adamek 60'; W. Kowalski 82'	Stadium: Stadion Jutrzenki; Attendance: 1,000

24 August 1924 3	Olsza Kraków	0–5	Wisła Kraków	Kraków
		Report	W. Kowalski; H. Reyman; Czulak; Markiewicz (pen.)	Stadium: Stadion Wisły

6 September 1924 4	Wisła Kraków	7–0	Jutrzenka Kraków	Kraków
16:30 CEST (UTC+1)	Balcer 10'; H. Reyman 27', 54', 72'; W. Kowalski 65', 74'; Czulak 82'	Report		Stadium: Stadion Wisły; Referee: Andrzej Rutkowski (Kraków)

21 September 1924 5	KS Cracovia	2–0	Wisła Kraków	Kraków
16:00 CEST (UTC+1)	Gintel ??', 86'	Report		Stadium: Stadion Cracovii; Attendance: 6,000; Referee: Zygmunt Rosenfeld (Bielsko)

28 September 1924 6	Wisła Kraków	3–0	Wawel Kraków	Kraków
16:00 CEST (UTC+1)	Czulak; S. Reyman; W. Kowalski	Report		Stadium: Stadion Wisły; Attendance: 200

5 October 1924 7	BBSV Bielsko	2–5	Wisła Kraków	Bielsko
	Wójcik 2' (o.g.) ? 55'	Report	H. Reyman 4', 5', 46'; Czulak ??'; W. Kowalski ??'	Referee: Zygmunt Rosenfeld (Bielsko)

12 October 1924 8	Wisła Kraków	4–2	KS Cracovia	Kraków
15:00 CEST (UTC+1)	Strycharz 12' (o.g.); W. Kowalski 39'; Balcer 49'; Czulak 59'	Report	Gintel 5'; Sperling 7'	Stadium: Stadion Wisły; Attendance: 5,000

19 October 1924 9	Wawel Kraków	2–1	Wisła Kraków	Kraków
11:00 CEST (UTC+1)	B. Seichter 1'; Sołtys 36'	Report		Stadium: Stadion Cracovii; Attendance: 1,000

26 October 1924 10	Wisła Kraków	3–0	Olsza Kraków	Kraków
14:30 CEST (UTC+1)	W. Kowalski 8', 82'; Czulak 67'	Report		Stadium: Stadion Wisły

=== League standings ===
Pos	Team	Pld	Won	Drw	Lst	GF	GA	Pts	GD	Notes
1	Wisła Kraków	10	8	0	2	37	8	16	+29	Qualification to 1925 Polish Football Championship
2	Jutrzenka Kraków	10	7	1	2	13	14	15	-1	
3	KS Cracovia	10	5	1	4	24	13	11	+11	
4	Wawel Kraków	10	3	3	4	9	15	9	-6	
5	BBSV Bielsko	10	3	2	5	11	17	8	-6	
6	Olsza Kraków	10	0	1	9	5	32	1	-27	Relegation to 1925 B-Klasa (Kraków)

== Notable players ==
- (Poland) Adam Obrubański
- (Poland) Henryk Reyman
