= 1933 Wisła Kraków season =

Wisła Kraków
1933 season
- Chairman: Tadeusz Orzelski
- Ekstraklasa: 3rd
- Top goalscorer: Artur Woźniak (19 goals)

The 1933 season was Wisła Kraków's 25th year as a club.

== Friendlies ==
1 January 1933	Wisła Kraków (Poland)	5–3	(Poland) Korona Kraków	Kraków, Poland
12:00 CET (UTC+1)	Adamek; Łyko; Koziarski	Report	Syrek; Kochański	Stadium: Stadion Wisły

5 March 1933	Wisła Kraków (Poland)	8–0	(Poland) Legja Kraków	Kraków, Poland
11:30 CET (UTC+1)	Koziarski; Łyko; Adamek; Feret	Report		Stadium: Stadion Wisły

12 March 1933	Olsza Kraków (Poland)	0–5	(Poland) Wisła Kraków	Kraków, Poland
11:30 CET (UTC+1)		Report	Lubowiecki; Woźniak; Obtułowicz; Łyko	Stadium: Boisko Olszy; Referee: Eugeniusz Kochanek (Kraków)

25 March 1933	Wisła Kraków (Poland)	2–0	(Poland) Garbarnia Kraków	Kraków, Poland
15:30 CET (UTC+1)	H. Reyman 25'; Woźniak 60'	Report		Stadium: Stadion Wisły; Referee: Jakub Seidner (Kraków)

4 April 1933	Wisła Kraków (Poland)	3–2	(Poland) 06 Mysłowice	Kraków, Poland
11:15 CET (UTC+1)	Adamek; Woźniak	Report	Walczak; Ksoll	Stadium: Stadion Wisły; Attendance: 500; Referee: Józef Gauda (Kraków)

17 April 1933	1. FC Katowice (Poland)	5–2	(Poland) Wisła Kraków	Katowice, Poland
	E. Görlitz 9'; Herisz 24', 26'; Pośpiech 63'; Wilimowski 66'	Report	Obtułowicz 15'; Balcer 58'	Attendance: 2,500; Referee: Jan Stronczek (Świętochłowice)

18 April 1933	Wisła Kraków (Poland)	1–4	(Czechoslovakia) DFC Prag	Kraków, Poland
16:00 CET (UTC+1)	Woźniak 52'	Report	Bressany 14'; Truntschka 17', 33'; Ebhardt 81'	Stadium: Stadion Wisły; Attendance: 2,000; Referee: Józef Lustgarten (Kraków)

15 May 1933	Repr. Emigracji Francuskiej (France)	3–1	(Poland) Wisła Kraków	Montigny-en-Gohelle, France
	Polski 12'; Łuczak 18'; Kłosowski ??'	Report	Łyko ??'	Attendance: 7,000

17 May 1933	Belgium	3–0	(Poland) Wisła Kraków	Brussels, Belgium
21:00 CET (UTC+1)	Voorhoof 40'; Torfs ??', 80'	Report		Stadium: Stade du Centenaire; Attendance: 30,000; Referee: John Langenus (Belgium)

20 May 1933	Royal Antwerp FC (Belgium)	5–1	(Poland) Wisła Kraków	Antwerp, Belgium
	Bastin 20', 65'; Ulens 43'; Van Beeck ??', 62'	Report	Woźniak 50'	Attendance: 5,000; Referee: John Langenus (Belgium)

21 May 1933	Repr. Emigracji Francuskiej (France)	2–1	(Poland) Wisła Kraków	Bruay-la-Buissiere, France
	Polski; Łuczek	Report	H. Reyman	Attendance: 3,000

24 May 1933	Racing Club Paris (France)	1–0	(Poland) Wisła Kraków	Paris, France
21:00 CET (UTC+1)	Kennedy 44'	Report		Stadium: Stade Buffalo; Attendance: 9,000

5 June 1933	BKS Biała (Poland)	0–3	(Poland) Wisła Kraków	Biała, Poland
		Report

23 July 1933	KS Cracovia (Poland)	1–0	(Poland) Wisła Kraków	Kraków, Poland
19:00 CET (UTC+1)	Kubiński	Report		Stadium: Stadion Cracovii; Referee: Józef Gauda (Kraków)
Note: The match lasted 2x30 minutes

30 July 1933	Wisła Kraków (Poland)	13–2	(Poland) Olsza Kraków	Kraków, Poland
17:30 CET (UTC+1)	Woźniak; Obtułowicz; Sołtysik; Łyko; Habowski; Jan Kotlarczyk (pen.) ? (o.g.)	Report	Piekarz; Kowalski	Stadium: Stadion Wisły

6 August 1933	Wisła Kraków (Poland)	6–1	(Poland) Reprezentacja RKS Krakowa	Kraków, Poland
	Woźniak; Sołtysik; Feret	Report

10 September 1933	Korona Kraków (Poland)	0–1	(Poland) Wisła Kraków	Kraków, Poland
		Report	Habowski	Referee: Józef Lustgarten (Kraków)

15 October 1933	Wisła Kraków (Poland)	7–2	(Poland) Wawel Kraków	Kraków, Poland
	Woźniak; Sołtysik; Jędrzejczyk	Report		Referee: Leopold Heitner (Kraków)

3 December 1933	Wisła Kraków (Poland)	2–4	(Poland) Garbarnia Kraków	Kraków, Poland
	Feret; Obtułowicz	Report	Halicki; Bator; Gut	Stadium: Stadion Wisły

== Ekstraklasa ==
=== Western Group ===
9 April 1933 1	Wisła Kraków	2–0	Ruch Hajduki Wielkie	Kraków
16:00 CET (UTC+1)	H. Reyman 47', 69'	Report		Stadium: Stadion Wisły; Attendance: 3,000; Referee: Jakub Seidner (Kraków)

23 April 1933 2	Ruch Hajduki Wielkie	1–0	Wisła Kraków	Hajduki Wielkie
16:00 CET (UTC+1)	Wodarz 66'	Report		Stadium: Boisko Ruchu; Attendance: 4,000; Referee: Bolesław Posner (Bielsko)

30 April 1933 3	Warta Poznań	1–2	Wisła Kraków	Poznań
16:00 CET (UTC+1)	F. Scherfke 83' (pen.)	Report	Woźniak 58'; Balcer 63'	Stadium: Stadion Warty; Attendance: 5,000; Referee: Kazimierz Wardęszkiewicz (Łódź)

3 May 1933 4	Wisła Kraków	1–1	KS Cracovia	Kraków
16:30 CET (UTC+1)	Czulak 53'	Report	Pająk 88'	Stadium: Stadion Wisły; Attendance: 5,000; Referee: Andrzej Rutkowski (Kraków)

29 May 1933 5	Wisła Kraków	0–2	Garbarnia Kraków	Kraków
17:00 CET (UTC+1)		Report	Rogowski 26', 43'	Stadium: Stadion Wisły; Attendance: 3,500; Referee: Józef Lustgarten (Kraków)

10 June 1933 6	KS Cracovia	4 – 1 (3 – 0 w.o.)	Wisła Kraków	Kraków
17:30 CET (UTC+1)	Kisieliński 15'; Zieliński 37'; Malczyk 55'; Kubiński 83'	Report	Woźniak 73'; H. Reyman (red card) 84'	Stadium: Stadion Cracovii; Attendance: 7,000; Referee: Zygmunt Rosenfeld (Bielsko)
Note: Wisła players come off the pitch after 85 minutes.

18 June 1933 7	Wisła Kraków	2–1	Warta Poznań	Kraków
17:30 CET (UTC+1)	Łyko 15'; Woźniak 84'	Report	Knioła 31'	Stadium: Stadion Wisły; Attendance: 2,000; Referee: Józef Seeman (Lwów)

25 June 1933 8	Garbarnia Kraków	2–2	Wisła Kraków	Kraków
17:30 CET (UTC+1)	Smoczek 2'; Skwarczowski 25'	Report	Woźniak 47'; Sołtysik 67'	Stadium: Stadion Garbarni; Attendance: 3,000; Referee: Oskar Kurzweil (Lwów)

2 July 1933 9	Wisła Kraków	10–1	Podgórze Kraków	Kraków
17:30 CET (UTC+1)	Obtułowicz 5', 42', 90'; Feret 18', 35'; Woźniak 25', 31', 45', 57'; Sołtysik 87'	Report	Hodór 27'	Stadium: Stadion Wisły; Attendance: 1,000; Referee: Józef Gauda (Kraków)

16 July 1933 10	Podgórze Kraków	0–4	Wisła Kraków	Kraków
17:30 CET (UTC+1)		Report	Woźniak 58', 81'; Obtułowicz 61', 74'	Stadium: Stadion Garbarni; Attendance: 2,500; Referee: Maksymilian Schneider (Kraków)

=== Championship round ===
13 August 1933 11	Legia Warsaw	2–3	Wisła Kraków	Warsaw
16:45 CET (UTC+1)	Nawrot 17'; Przeździecki 21'	Report	Obtułowicz 35'; Woźniak 37', 48'	Stadium: Stadion Wojska Polskiego; Attendance: 2,000; Referee: Kazimierz Wardęszkiewicz (Łódź)

15 August 1933 12	ŁKS Łódź	1–1	Wisła Kraków	Łódź
16:45 CET (UTC+1)	Herbstreit 11'	Report	Sołtysik 30'	Stadium: Stadion ŁKS-u; Attendance: 2,000; Referee: Ludwik Laskowski (Warsaw)

27 August 1933 13	Wisła Kraków	1–0	Ruch Hajduki Wielkie	Kraków
16:15 CET (UTC+1)	Woźniak 18'	Report		Stadium: Stadion Wisły; Attendance: 3,000; Referee: Oskar Kurzweil (Lwów)

3 September 1933 14	KS Cracovia	1–3	Wisła Kraków	Kraków
16:00 CET (UTC+1)	Malczyk 43'	Report	Sołtysik 22'; Woźniak 52', 62'	Stadium: Stadion Cracovii; Attendance: 5,000; Referee: Kazimierz Wardęszkiewicz (Łódź)

17 September 1933 15	Wisła Kraków	1–0	ŁKS Łódź	Kraków
15:30 CET (UTC+1)	Woźniak 19'	Report		Stadium: Stadion Wisły; Attendance: 2,000; Referee: Szczepan Kreicarek (Przemyśl)

24 September 1933 16	Pogoń Lwów	1–0	Wisła Kraków	Lwów
15:00 CET (UTC+1)	Mie. Matyas 71'	Report		Stadium: Stadion Pogoni; Attendance: 5,000; Referee: Kazimierz Wardęszkiewicz (Łódź)

1 October 1933 17	Wisła Kraków	3–0	Legia Warsaw	Kraków
15:00 CET (UTC+1)	Obtułowicz 22' (pen.); Sołtysik 75'; Woźniak 85'	Report		Stadium: Stadion Wisły; Attendance: 3,000; Referee: Bolesław Posner (Bielsko)

8 October 1933 18	Ruch Hajduki Wielkie	2–1	Wisła Kraków	Hajduki Wielkie
	Loewe 25'; Urban 85'	Report	Obtułowicz 74'	Stadium: Boisko Ruchu; Attendance: 7,500; Referee: Szczepan Kreicarek (Przemyśl)

22 October 1933 19	Wisła Kraków	1–1	KS Cracovia	Kraków
14:30 CET (UTC+1)	Woźniak 57'	Report	Malczyk 13'	Stadium: Stadion Wisły; Attendance: 5,000; Referee: Zbigniew Mosiński (Warsaw)

1 November 1933 20	Wisła Kraków	1–1	Pogoń Lwów	Kraków
11:30 CET (UTC+1)	Woźniak 20'; Łyko (red card) 82'	Report	Niechcioł 37'; Hanin (red card) 82'	Stadium: Stadion Wisły; Attendance: 4,000; Referee: Kazimierz Wardęszkiewicz (Łódź)

== Squad, appearances and goals ==
No.	Pos	Nat	Player	Total		I Liga	
No.	Pos	Nat	Player	Apps	Goals	Apps	Goals
	GK	(Poland) POL	Edward Ałaszewski	1	0	0+1	0
	GK	(Poland) POL	Marian Kiliński	7	0	7+0	0
	GK	(Poland) POL	Maksymilian Koźmin	1	0	1+0	0
	GK	(Poland) POL	Edward Madejski	12	0	12+0	0
	DF	(Poland) POL	Eugeniusz Feret	14	2	14+0	2
	DF	(Poland) POL	Ferdynand Pachner	4	0	4+0	0
	DF	(Poland) POL	Aleksander Pychowski	20	0	20+0	0
	DF	(Poland) POL	Władysław Szumilas	16	0	16+0	0
	MF	(Poland) POL	Karol Bajorek	9	0	9+0	0
	MF	(Poland) POL	Bolesław Habowski	1	0	1+0	0
	MF	(Poland) POL	Mieczysław Jezierski	12	0	12+0	0
	MF	(Poland) POL	Piotr Jędrzejczyk	1	0	1+0	0
	MF	(Poland) POL	Jan Kotlarczyk	19	0	19+0	0
	MF	(Poland) POL	Józef Kotlarczyk	20	0	20+0	0
	FW	(Poland) POL	Józef Adamek	1	0	1+0	0
	FW	(Poland) POL	Mieczysław Balcer	4	1	4+0	1
	FW	(Poland) POL	Stanisław Czulak	3	1	3+0	1
	FW	(Poland) POL	Antoni Łyko	17	1	17+0	1
	FW	(Poland) POL	Stanisław Obtułowicz	14	8	14+0	8
	FW	(Poland) POL	Henryk Reyman	6	2	6+0	2
	FW	(Poland) POL	Jan Reyman	5	0	5+0	0
	FW	(Poland) POL	Kazimierz Sołtysik	14	5	14+0	5
	FW	(Poland) POL	Artur Woźniak	20	19	20+0	19

=== Goalscorers ===
Place	Position	Nation	Name	I Liga
1	FW	(Poland)	Artur Woźniak	19
2	FW	(Poland)	Stanisław Obtułowicz	8
3	FW	(Poland)	Kazimierz Sołtysik	5
4	DF	(Poland)	Eugeniusz Feret	2
4	FW	(Poland)	Henryk Reyman	2
6	FW	(Poland)	Antoni Łyko	1
6	FW	(Poland)	Stanisław Czulak	1
6	FW	(Poland)	Mieczysław Balcer	1
			Total	39

=== Disciplinary record ===
Name	Nation	Position	Ekstraklasa	Total
Name	Nation	Position	Sent off (straight red)	Sent off (straight red)
Henryk Reyman	(Poland)	FW	1	1
Antoni Łyko	(Poland)	FW	1	1
