= Kazimierz Seichter =

Polish footballer

Personal information
- Date of birth: 22 February 1900
- Place of birth: Kraków, Austria-Hungary
- Date of death: 13 December 1971 (aged 71)
- Place of death: Kraków, Poland
- Height: 1.62 m (5 ft 4 in)
- Position: Midfielder

Senior career*
Years	Team	Apps	(Gls)
1919–1927	Wawel Kraków		
1927–1934	Cracovia		

International career
1925–1927	Poland	3	(0)
- * Club domestic league appearances and goals

Kazimierz Seichter (22 February 1900 – 13 December 1971) was a Polish footballer who played as a midfielder.

He made three appearances for the Poland national team from 1925 to 1927.

== Honours ==
Cracovia

- Ekstraklasa: 1930, 1932
