= Ziemiański =

Ziemiański (feminine: Ziemiańska) is a Polish surname. It may refer to:

- Andrzej Ziemiański (born 1960), Polish writer
- Stanisław Ziemiański (1892-1965), footballer
- Stanisław Ziemiański (Jesuit) (born 1931), Jesuit philosopher
