= Lustgarten (disambiguation) =

Lustgarten is a park in Berlin

Lustgarten can also refer to:

- Józef Lustgarten, Polish footballer
- Edgar Lustgarten, British crime writer
- Lustgarten Foundation for Pancreatic Cancer Research, medical foundation
