= Stanisław Malczyk =

Polish footballer (1910–1973)

Personal information
- Date of birth: 28 February 1910
- Place of birth: Kraków, Austria-Hungary
- Date of death: 13 February 1973 (aged 62)
- Place of death: Kraków, Poland
- Height: 1.65 m (5 ft 5 in)
- Position: Forward

Senior career*
Years	Team	Apps	(Gls)
1927–1928	Olsza Kraków		
1928–1938	Cracovia		

International career
1932–1935	Poland	3	(1)

Managerial career
- 1948–1949: Cracovia
- 1963–1964: Stal Mielec
- * Club domestic league appearances and goals

Stanisław Malczyk (28 February 1910 – 13 February 1973) was a Polish footballer and manager.

He played in three matches for the Poland national team from 1932 to 1935.

== Honours ==
=== Player ===
Cracovia

- Ekstraklasa: 1930, 1932, 1937

=== Manager ===
Cracovia

- Ekstraklasa: 1948
