= Leon Sperling =

Polish footballer

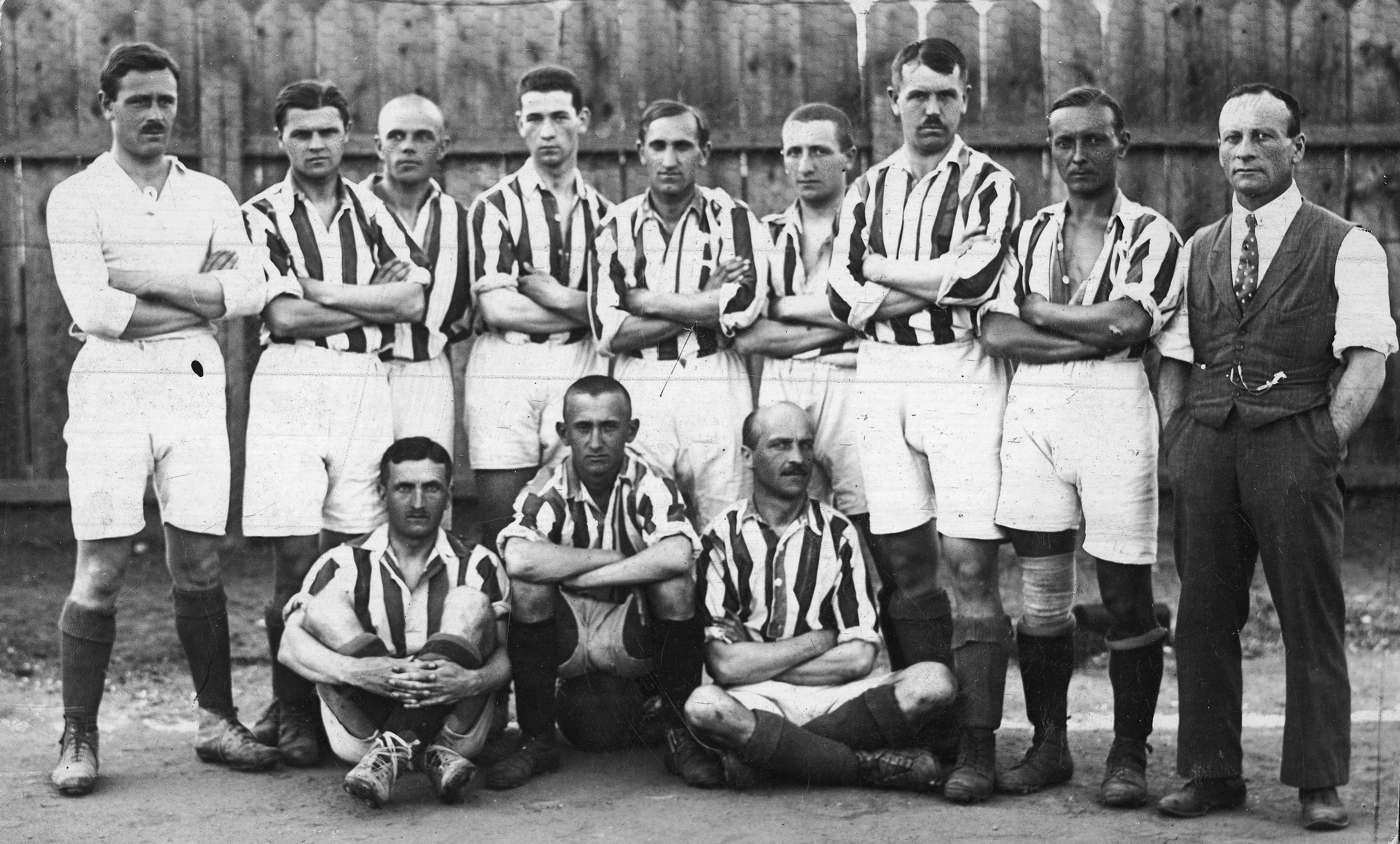
- Sperling (fourth from right) with Cracovia in 1921

Personal information
- Date of birth: 7 August 1900
- Place of birth: Kraków, Austria-Hungary
- Date of death: c. 15 December 1941 (aged 41)
- Place of death: Lwów Ghetto, Poland
- Height: 1.64 m (5 ft 5 in)
- Position: Forward

Senior career*
Years	Team	Apps	(Gls)
1914–1916	Jutrzenka Kraków		
1917	Cracovia		
1918–1920	Jutrzenka Kraków		
1920–1934	Cracovia		

International career
1921–1930	Poland	16	(2)
- * Club domestic league appearances and goals

Leon Sperling (7 August 1900 – c. 15 December 1941) was a Polish footballer.

== Life ==
Sperling was born in Kraków, and was Jewish. He was a forward, playing on the left wing. Sperling represented Cracovia, the team he led in 1921, 1930, and 1932 to the Championship of Poland. He also played in 16 games for the Poland national team, including Poland's lone game at the 1924 Paris Olympic Games. He was regarded as a highly skilled dribbler. He also coached in Lviv. Sperling is one of Cracovia Kraków's legends.

Sperling was shot to death by the German Nazis in the Lwów Ghetto in December 1941. His Jewish teammate, Józef Klotz, was also killed in the Holocaust.

== Honours ==
Cracovia

- Ekstraklasa: 1921, 1930, 1932

== See also ==
- List of select Jewish football (association; soccer) players
