= Ludwik Schneider =

Polish footballer

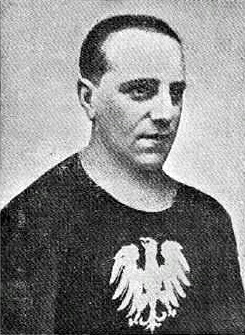

Personal information
- Date of birth: 13 August 1899
- Place of birth: Sivka, Ukraine
- Date of death: 1972 (aged 72–73)
- Place of death: New York, United States
- Height: 1.63 m (5 ft 4 in)
- Position: Midfielder

Senior career*
Years	Team	Apps	(Gls)
1914–1924	Pogoń Lwów		
1924–1937	Hasmonea Lwów		

International career
1923–1926	Poland	2	(0)
- * Club domestic league appearances and goals

Ludwik Schneider (13 August 1899 – 1972) was a Polish footballer who played as a midfielder. He played in two matches for the Poland national football team from 1923 to 1926.

== Honours ==
Pogoń Lwów

- Ekstraklasa: 1922, 1923
