= Young Leaders Rally Cup =

- Founded: 1 April 1952
- Abolished: 21 July 1952
- Region: Poland
- Teams: 12
- Most championships: Wawel Kraków (1 title)

The Cup of the Rally of Young Leaders (also called the Young Leaders Rally Cup and the Cup of the Polish Youth Union) (Polish: Puchar Zlotu Młodych Przodowników) was the first League Cup in Polish football. The tournament was created by the then president of the Polish Football Association with all 12 teams of the I liga being involved. Due to the league being delayed until after the 1952 Summer Olympics the tournament provided the players a chance to show off their skills with a chance of being called up into the Olympic squad. The tournament took place in Warsaw with the 12 teams being split into 2 groups of 6, with teams in each group playing each other twice. The tournament took its name from the youth rally that was taking place in the city from 20 to 22 July 1952.

The final took place on 20 July 1952 in the Polish Army Stadium. The final was between the winners of each group, Wawel Kraków and Cracovia, with Wawel winning the final. There were also playoffs for the 3rd and 5th places.

== Group stage ==
=== Group 1 ===
| Pos. | Club | Played | Pts | GF | GA | Notes |
|---|---|---|---|---|---|---|
| 1 | Wawel Kraków | 10 | 19 | 37 | 7 | To play Cracovia in the final |
| 2 | Wisła Kraków | 10 | 11 | 17 | 12 | To play AKS Chorzów in the 3rd place playoff |
| 3 | Lechia Gdańsk | 10 | 11 | 13 | 14 | To play Lech Poznań in the 5th place playoff |
| 4 | Polonia Warsaw | 10 | 9 | 19 | 16 | Knocked out |
| 5 | Polonia Bytom | 10 | 5 | 10 | 25 | Knocked out |
| 6 | Polonia Bytom | 10 | 5 | 5 | 27 | Knocked out |

=== Group 2 ===
| Pos. | Club | Played | Pts | GF | GA | Notes |
|---|---|---|---|---|---|---|
| 1 | Cracovia | 10 | 16 | 22 | 14 | To play Wawel Kraków in the final |
| 2 | AKS Chorzów | 10 | 14 | 20 | 9 | To play Wisła Kraków in the 3rd place playoff |
| 3 | Lech Poznań | 10 | 12 | 22 | 16 | To play Lechia Gdańsk in the 5th place playoff |
| 4 | Legia Warsaw | 10 | 10 | 19 | 18 | Knocked out |
| 5 | Górnik Radlin | 10 | 7 | 11 | 16 | Knocked out |
| 6 | ŁKS Łódź | 10 | 1 | 9 | 30 | Knocked out |

== Finals stage ==
All finals took place in the Polish Army Stadium on 20 July 1952.

Fifth place playoff

Lech Poznań vs Lechia Gdańsk – 2:1 (2:1)

Third place playoff

Wisła Kraków vs AKS Chorzów – 2:1 (1:1)

Final

20 July 1952

| Wawel Kraków | 5–2 | Cracovia |

Polish Army Stadium, Warsaw
Attendance: 50,000

=== Final standings ===
1st: Wawel Kraków
2nd: Cracovia
3rd: Wisła Kraków
4th: AKS Chorzów
5th: Lech Poznań
6th: Lechia Gdańsk
