= Mieczysław Wiśniewski =

Polish footballer

Personal information
- Date of birth: 23 November 1892
- Place of birth: Monastyryska, Austrian Empire
- Date of death: 10 October 1952 (aged 59)
- Place of death: Kraków, Poland
- Height: 1.87 m (6 ft 2 in)
- Position: Goalkeeper

Senior career*
Years	Team	Apps	(Gls)
1904–1906	Wacker Vienna		
1906–1908	Phoenix Wien		
1909–1910	Wiener AC		
1910–1911	Viktoria Wien		
1911	1. Simmeringer SC		
1911–1912	Vienna CFC		
1912–1919	SpC Rudolfshügel		
1919–1921	Cracovia		
1921–1924	Wisła Kraków		
1927–1928	Cracovia		

International career
1922–1924	Poland	6	(0)

Managerial career
- 1925: Wawel Kraków
- * Club domestic league appearances and goals

Mieczysław Wiśniewski (23 November 1892 – 10 October 1952) was a Polish footballer who played as a goalkeeper.

He competed in the men's tournament at the 1924 Summer Olympics.
