= Władysław Prymka =

Polish footballer

Personal information
- Date of birth: 5 June 1895
- Place of birth: Poznań, Poland
- Date of death: 29 June 1963 (aged 68)
- Place of death: Trzemeszno, Poland
- Position: Forward

Senior career*
Years	Team	Apps	(Gls)
1913–1922	Warta Poznań		

International career
1922	Poland	1	(0)
- * Club domestic league appearances and goals

Władysław Prymka (5 June 1895 – 29 June 1963) was a Polish footballer who played as a forward. He played in one match for the Poland national football team in 1922.

== Honours ==
Warta Poznań

- Greater Poland Football Championship: 1914
- Klasa A Poznań: 1921, 1922
