= Rudolf Hanel =

Austrian footballer

Personal information
- Place of birth: Vienna, Austria
- Position: Midfielder

Senior career*
Years	Team	Apps	(Gls)
- SC Rekord XV
- Fünfhauser SK
1921–1926	Slovan Wien	84	(74)
1926	Rapid Wien	11	(6)
1927	First Vienna	7	(6)
1927–1928	Slovan Wien	32	(13)
1928–1929	Nicholson Wien	11	(10)
1929–1931	Wiener Sport-Club	45	(19)
1931–1932	Nicholson Wien	8	(2)
1932	FC Wien	11	(1)
1932–1933	Brigittenauer	7	(1)
1933	Wiener Sport-Club	3	(2)
1933–1935	Post SV Wien		

International career
1926	Austria	2	(2)
- * Club domestic league appearances and goals

Rudolf Hanel was an Austrian footballer who played for a number of clubs in Austria. He featured twice for the Austria national football team in 1926, scoring two goals.

== Career statistics ==
=== International ===
Appearances and goals by national team and year
National team	Year	Apps	Goals
Austria	1926	2	2
Total		2	2

=== International goals ===
Scores and results list Austria's goal tally first.

No	Date	Venue	Opponent	Score	Result	Competition
1.	2 May 1926	Hungária körúti stadion, Budapest, Hungary	Hungary	2–0	3–0	Friendly
2.	30 May 1926	Simmeringer Sportplatz, Vienna, Austria	France	1–1	4–1	Friendly
