= Józef Słonecki =

Polish footballer

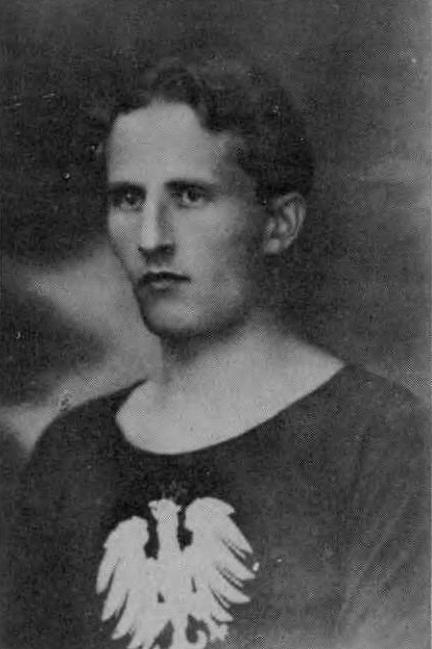

Personal information
- Full name: Józef Emil Słonecki
- Date of birth: 11 August 1899
- Place of birth: Lwów, Austria-Hungary
- Date of death: 1 October 1970 (aged 71)
- Place of death: Bytom, Poland
- Height: 1.67 m (5 ft 6 in)
- Position: Right winger

Youth career
- 1914–1918: Pogoń Lwów

Senior career*
Years	Team	Apps	(Gls)
1918	Torino		
1921–1925	Pogoń Lwów		
1925–1926	Edera Triest		
1926–1929	Pogoń Lwów		

International career
1923–1925	Poland	6	(0)

Managerial career
- Polonia Bytom
- * Club domestic league appearances and goals

Józef Emil Słonecki (11 August 1899 – 1 October 1970) was a Polish footballer who played as a right winger. He played in six matches for the Poland national football team from 1923 to 1925.

== Honours ==
Pogoń Lwów

- Ekstraklasa: 1922, 1923, 1925
