= Józef Kubiński =

Polish footballer

Personal information
- Date of birth: 8 March 1898
- Place of birth: Kraków, Austria-Hungary
- Date of death: 11 January 1968 (aged 69)
- Place of death: Kraków, Poland
- Height: 1.70 m (5 ft 7 in)
- Position: Forward

Senior career*
| Years | Team | Apps | (Gls) |
- Polonia Kraków
| 1915–1934 | Cracovia | | |

International career
| 1926–1928 | Poland | 3 | (0) |

Managerial career
- 1933–1934: Podgórze Kraków
- 1947: Cracovia
- * Club domestic league appearances and goals

Józef Kubiński (8 March 1898 – 11 January 1968) was a Polish footballer who played as a forward.

He made three appearances for the Poland national team from 1926 to 1928.

== Honours ==
Cracovia

- Ekstraklasa: 1930, 1932
