= Ludwik Gintel =

Polish footballer (1899–1973)

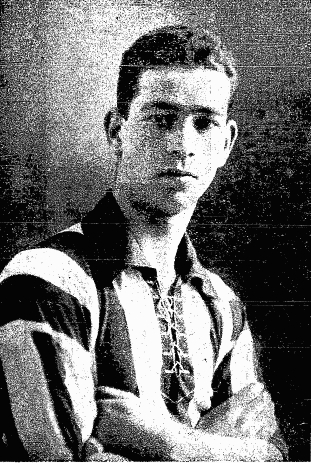
- Gintel in 1922

Personal information
- Date of birth: 26 September 1899
- Place of birth: Kraków, Austria-Hungary
- Date of death: 11 July 1973 (aged 73)
- Place of death: Tel Aviv, Israel
- Height: 1.78 m (5 ft 10 in)
- Positions: Right-back; forward

Senior career*
Years	Team	Apps	(Gls)
1911–1916	Jutrzenka Kraków		
1916–1930	Cracovia		

International career
1921–1925	Poland	8	(0)
- * Club domestic league appearances and goals

Ludwik Gintel (Hebrew: לודוויק גינטל; 26 September 1899 – 11 July 1973) was a Polish footballer.

== Early and personal life ==
Gintel was born Kraków. He was Jewish. He worked as an architect and bank clerk.

== Football career ==
Gintel began his football career playing for the Jewish Sports Association Jutrzenka Kraków. He then played 328 games for Cracovia, until 1931, as a right-back (later forward). With Cracovia, he was twice the champion of Poland (1921 and 1930). In 1928, he was the Polish top division's top scorer.

He was also capped 12 times for the Poland national team, making eight official appearances. Included among his appearances for the team was in their first-ever Olympic appearance at the 1924 Olympic Games.

== After football career ==
After the World War II broke out, he emigrated to Palestine. He died by suicide in Tel Aviv, Israel, in 1973.

== Honours ==
Cracovia

- Ekstraklasa: 1921, 1930

Individual

- Ekstraklasa top scorer: 1928

== See also ==
- List of select Jewish football (association; soccer) players
