= Léon Torfs =

Belgian footballer

Personal information
- Date of birth: 22 September 1909

International career
Years	Team	Apps	(Gls)
1933–1937	Belgium	3	(0)

Léon Torfs (born 22 September 1909, date of death unknown) was a Belgian footballer. He played in three matches for the Belgium national football team from 1933 to 1937.
