= Zbigniew Niziński =

Polish footballer

Personal information
- Date of birth: 2 April 1900
- Place of birth: Grabów nad Prosną, Prussia
- Date of death: 1 May 1975 (aged 75)
- Place of death: Szczecin, Poland
- Height: 1.70 m (5 ft 7 in)
- Position: Forward

Senior career*
Years	Team	Apps	(Gls)
–1918	Chelsea Poznań		
1918–1927	Warta Poznań		
1928	Unia Poznań		
1928	TKS Toruń		
1928–1929	Gedania Gdańsk		
1929	Warta Poznań		
1929	Polonia Bydgoszcz		
1930–1931	Legia Poznań		

International career
1922	Poland	1	(0)
- * Club domestic league appearances and goals

Zbigniew Niziński (2 April 1900 – 1 May 1975) was a Polish footballer who played as a forward.

He made one appearance for the Poland national team in 1922.
