= Stanisław Ziemiański (Jesuit) =

Polish Jesuit philosopher (born 1931)

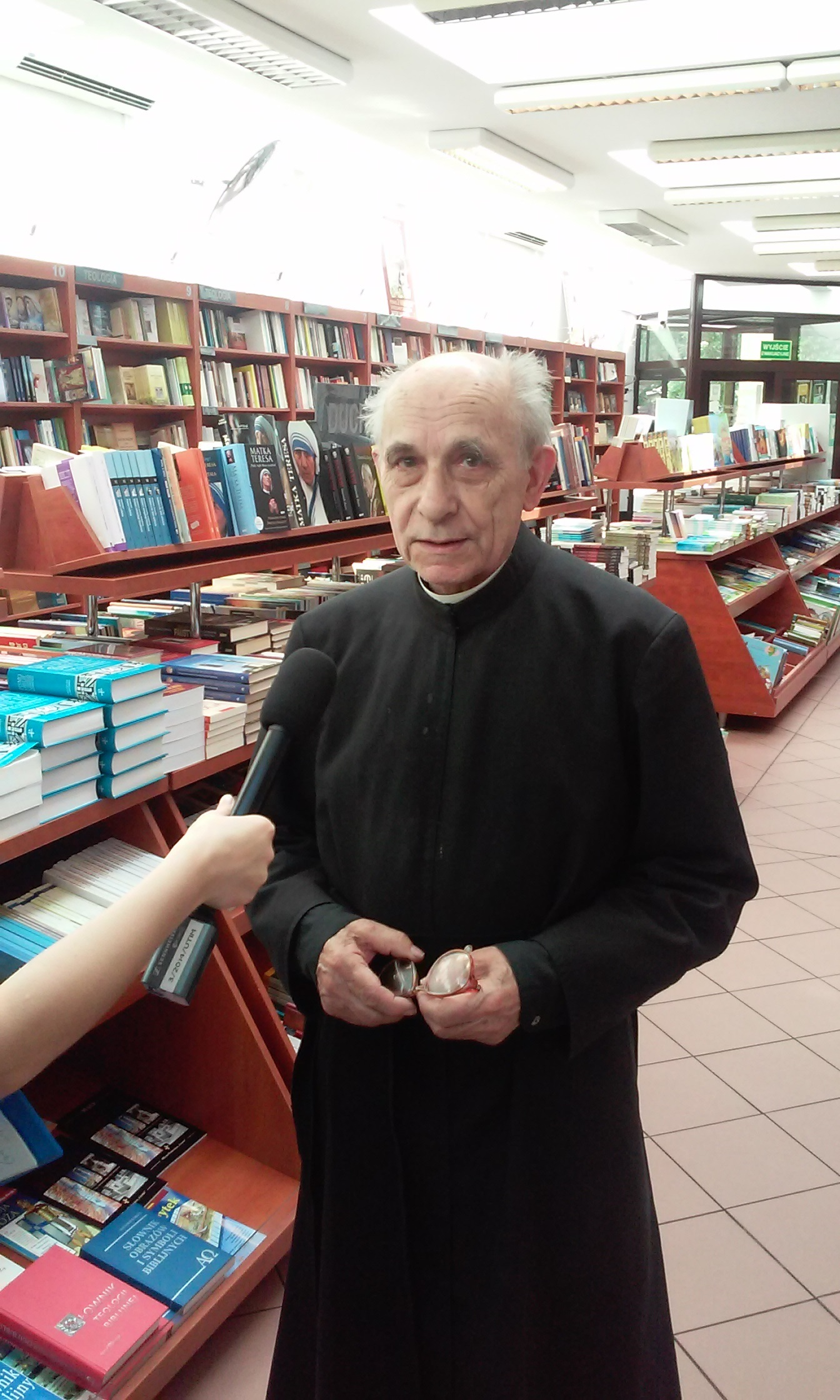
ks. prof. Stanisław Ziemiański

Stanislaw Ziemiański (born 1931) is a Polish Jesuit philosopher and theologian, and a composer of numerous religious songs and hymns.

== Life and academic activity ==
Ziemiański was born on September 7, 1931, in Besko, near Sanok, Poland. He entered the Jesuit Order 1949 and studied at the Jesuit Faculty of Philosophy in Kraków (1953-1956) and theology at the Jesuit Faculty of Theology Bobolanum in Warsaw (1956–1960). He was ordained a priest in 1959. He continued his philosophical studies at the Catholic University of Lublin (1960-1963), obtaining a Ph.D. His doctoral dissertation, "Ontologiczne podstawy definicji w systemie Arystotelesa" (Ontological Foundations of the Theory of Definition in the Aristotle's System), was supervised by Prof. M.A. Krąpiec OP.

In 1962 Ziemiański was appointed a lecturer at the Jesuit Faculty of Philosophy in Kraków (now Academy Ignatianum). He taught metaphysics, theodicy and cosmology, and history of medieval philosophy.

Ziemiański has been linked to the Jesuit Faculty of Philosophy in Cracow for more than fifty years, taking an active part in its administration. He headed the Jesuit Learned Society in Cracow (1988-1993). He was a president of the Philosophical Section of the Polish Theological Society from 1988 to 1993. He served as a visiting professor at Le Moyne College in Syracuse, New York, from 1984 to 1985, lecturing in theodicy. He was director of the Section of Systematic Philosophy at the Jesuit Faculty of Philosophy in Cracow (1991-1994) and a vice-dean of the Faculty (1994-2001). In 1990 he obtained his habilitation, a post-doctoral academic qualification, after presenting a dissertation: Teologia naturalna. Filozoficzna problematyka Boga [Natural Theology. A Philosophical Approach to God]. In 1991 he became an associate professor, and in 1999 a full professor. In 1993–2003 Ziemiański was a professor at the Faculty of Philosophy of the Pontifical Theological Academy in Cracow, while continuing to lecture at the Ignatianum. 2001–2009 he was a professor at the Theological Faculty in Bratislava (Trnava University, Slovakia).

In 1988–1992 and again in 2004–2006, he was an associate editor of the academic journal, Rocznik Wydziału Filozoficznego Towarzystwa Jezusowego w Krakowie (now, Rocznik Filozoficzny Ignatianum (Philosophical Yearbook Ignatianum) . 1996–2002, he has occupied a similar position in the editorial board of the multilingual journal, Forum Philosophicum”. Ziemiański worked 1965–1996 as a hospital chaplain in few clinics in Kraków; cf. his book written together with S. Kałuża: Poradnik dla kapelanów lecznictwa zamkniętego [Guide for Hospital Chaplains], Kraków 1991. The Church songs and hymns and religious songs occupy an important place in Ziemianski's literary output. He composed about 2300 musical items, becoming the most prolific author of the Church music in Poland.

== Philosophical views ==
Ziemiański’s philosophical views are presented especially in his book Natural Theology. In its first part he discusses the main problems of metaphysics, such as plurality of beings, rationality of the world, internal and external causality, and the theory of analogy. In the second part, he discusses a number of arguments for the existence of God. In doing it, he does not follow strictly the Five Ways of St. Thomas Aquinas, but rather tries to reinterpret them in the light of the contemporary sciences. In the third part of the book, he analyses the nature of God in a more traditional fashion. The problem of evil has been given a particular prominence. In many papers Ziemiański discusses the views on the possibility of metaphysics which he considers controversial and analyses the value of the traditional arguments for the existence of God and on the cognoscibility of God's nature. For example, he takes up the problem of contingency.

In Ziemiański's philosophy there is a noticeable inspiration derived from the Aristotelian and the Thomistic tradition, but his approach is often critical. Ziemiański takes into consideration the facts acknowledged by sciences, but he interprets them philosophically. He distinguishes, doing it, between the scientific and philosophical methods. He treats the empirical data as a starting point of the metaphysical interpretation. Therefore, one can recognize his philosophy as an empirical-rational approach.

== Principal publications ==
- Teologia naturalna. Filozoficzna problematyka Boga (Natural Theology).
- A Philosophical Approach to God], Kraków 1995, pp. 400; 2d ed. 2008.
- La finalité comme «antihasard» chez Aristote et St. Thomas d'Aquin, „Studi Tomistici” 14. Atti dell' VIII Congresso Tomistico Internazionale. Vol. V. Problemi metafisici. Città del Vaticano 1982, 351-358.
- Prawo wzrostu entropii w kosmologii relatywistycznej [Principle of Increasing Entropy in the Relativistic Cosmology], „Rocznik Wydziału Filozoficznego TJ w Krakowie”, Kraków 1989, 135-154.
- Die Abhängigkeitsrelation in der Argumentation für die Existenz Gottes, “Forum Philosophicum”, 7 (2002), 17-26.
- Problem ruchu lokalnego u Arystotelesa [The Problem of Local Movement according to Aristotle], Rocznik Wydziału FilozoficznegoTJ w Krakowie”, Kraków 1990, 125-135.
- Czy istnieje więcej niż jeden Bóg? [Is there more than one God?], Rocznik Wydziału Filozoficznego TJ w Krakowie”, Kraków 1993, 157-172.
- Wprowadzenie do filozofii przyrody nieożywionej [Introduction to the Philosophical Cosmology], Rocznik Wydziału Filozoficznego TJ”, Kraków 1994, 149-189.
- Filozoficzne implikacje ortodoksyjnej interpretacji teorii kwantów [Philosophical * * Implications of the Orthodox Interpretation of Quantum Theory], Forum Philosophicum”, 3 (1998), 77-93.
- Ontological Foundations of Responsibility for Human Actions,., Forum Philosophicum”, 3 (1999), 91-105;
- Między nadprzyrodzonym a filozoficznym obrazem Boga [Supernatural vs Philosophical Concept of God], in: Rozum i wiara mówią do mnie [Reason and Faith speak to me], Kraków 1999, 55-71.
- Czas i jego implikacje filozoficzne [Time nd its Philosophical Implications], „Rocznik Wydziału Filozoficznego TJ w Krakowie”, Kraków 1999, 76-89.
- Filozofia analityczna an argument z przygodności [Analytical Philosophy and Argument of Contingency], „Forum Philosophicum” 5 (2000) 201-219.
- Przyroda a cywilizacja [Nature and Civilization], in: Mowić o przyrodzie [How to Speak about Nature], Kraków 2001, 117-132.
- The Relation Between Sciences and Philosophy of God, Studia Aloisiana”, Bratislava 2003, 313-320.
- Possibility – Actuality – God, Forum Philosophicum”, 8 (2003), 5-48.
- Wchodzenie w byt [Coming to Be], Forum Philosophicum”, 10 (2005), 39-56.
- Jedna czy wiele dusz [One or more souls?], Forum Philosophicum”, 9 (2004), 73-92.
- The Beloved Disciple, Studia Aloisiana”, Bratislava 2004, 379-389.
- Αιτία a poznanie naukowe w systemie Arystotelesa [Aitia and scientific cognition in the system of Aristotle], Rocznik Wydziału Filozoficznego WSFP Ignatianum w Krakowie”, t. XI (2004-2005), 41-112.
- Ruch unieruchomiony [Movement Immobilized], „Forum Philosophicum” 11 (2006), 95-106.
- Naród [Nation], „Rocznik Wydziału Filozoficznego WSFP Ignatianum w Krakowie”, t. XII (2006), 35-48.
- Arystotelesa psychologia muzyki [Aristitle’s Psychology of Music], in: Donum natalicium. Studia Thaddaeo Przybylski octogenario dedicata. Red. Z. Fabiańska, et al., Kraków 2007, 247-261.
- Spacerem po filozofii [Selected Philosophical Problems], Kraków 2010, pp. 277.
- Rozmaitości filozoficzne [Philosophical Miscellany], Kraków 2010, pp. 287.
- Filozoficzne poznanie Boga [Philosophical Knowledge of God], Kraków 2011, pp. 95.

== General references ==
- Who is Who in the World, New Providence 1999.
- Dictionary of International Biography, Cambridge, IBC, 2000, and posterior editions.
- R. Darowski, Filozofia jezuitów w Polsce w XX wieku, Kraków 2001, 343-363.
- Philosophia rationis magistra vitae, Kraków 2005, vol. I, 77–147.
- R. Darowski, Prof. Stanisław Ziemiański, S.J. On the Occasion of His Seventy-Fifth Birthday, “Forum Philosophicum”, 11 (2006), 275–278.
- Philosophiae et Musicae. Liber iubilaris Professori Stanislao Ziemiański SJ septuagesimum quintum annum celebranti dicatus, Kraków 2006.
- Encyklopedia Filozofii Polskiej, Lublin 2011, vol.2, 883-885.
