= Bronisław Seichter =

Polish footballer

Personal information
- Full name: Bronisław Jan Seichter
- Date of birth: 12 July 1902
- Place of birth: Kraków, Poland
- Date of death: 30 September 1965 (aged 63)
- Place of death: Opole, Poland
- Height: 1.60 m (5 ft 3 in)
- Position: Midfielder

Senior career*
Years	Team	Apps	(Gls)
1918–1924	Wawel Kraków		
1924–1925	Ruch Sosnowiec		
1926–1928	Wawel Kraków		
1928–1932	Polonia Warsaw		
1933	Ruch Sosnowiec		
1934–1938	Polonia Warsaw		
1945–1946	Kolejarz Opole		

International career
1928–1930	Poland	2	(0)
- * Club domestic league appearances and goals

Bronisław Jan Seichter (12 July 1902 – 30 September 1965) was a Polish footballer who played as a midfielder. He played in two matches for the Poland national football team from 1928 to 1930.
