= Zygmunt Chruściński =

Polish footballer

Personal information
- Date of birth: 17 February 1899
- Place of birth: Kraków, Grand Duchy of Kraków, Austria-Hungary
- Date of death: 29 June 1952 (aged 53)
- Place of death: Kraków, Poland
- Height: 1.81 m (5 ft 11 in)
- Positions: Midfielder; forward

Senior career*
Years	Team	Apps	(Gls)
1919–1935	Cracovia		

International career
1924–1932	Poland	9	(1)

Managerial career
- 1945–1947: Cracovia
- * Club domestic league appearances and goals

Zygmunt Chruściński (17 February 1899 – 29 June 1952) was a Polish footballer.

He earned nine caps for the Poland national team from 1924 to 1932.

== Honours ==
Cracovia

- Polish Football Championship/Ekstraklasa: 1921, 1930, 1932
