= Izydor Redler =

Polish footballer

Personal information
- Date of birth: 25 November 1902
- Place of birth: Stryj, Russian Empire
- Date of death: 7 April 1981 (aged 78)
- Place of death: New York City, United States
- Height: 1.74 m (5 ft 9 in)
- Position: Defender

Senior career*
Years	Team	Apps	(Gls)
1918–1922	Pogoń Stryj		
1922–1923	Hasmonea Lwów		
1923	Legia Warsaw		
1923–1932	Hasmonea Lwów		

International career
1926	Poland	1	(0)
- * Club domestic league appearances and goals

Izydor Redler (25 November 1902 – 7 April 1981) was a Polish footballer who played as a defender.

He played in one match for the Poland national football team in 1926.
