= Stefan Śliwa =

Polish footballer

Personal information
- Full name: Stefan Augustyn Śliwa
- Date of birth: 13 August 1898
- Place of birth: Kraków, Austria-Hungary
- Date of death: 19 May 1964 (aged 65)
- Place of death: Dąbrowa Tarnowska, Poland
- Height: 1.70 m (5 ft 7 in)
- Positions: Midfielder; forward

Senior career*
Years	Team	Apps	(Gls)
1912–1914	Wisła Kraków		
1917–1918	Cracovia		
1917–1918	Wisła Kraków		
1918–1924	Pogoń Wilno		
1925–1927	Legia Warsaw		
1936	TESP Kałusz		

International career
1913	Galicia	1	(0)
1922–1923	Poland	3	(0)
- * Club domestic league appearances and goals

Stefan Augustyn Śliwa (13 August 1898 – 19 May 1964) was a Polish footballer. He played in three matches for the Poland national football team from 1922 to 1923.
