= 1923 Polish Football Championship =

4th season of top-tier football league in Poland

Polish Football Championship
- Season: 1923
- Dates: 12 August 1923 – 4 November 1923
- Champions: Pogoń Lwów (2nd title)
- Matches: 27
- Goals: 142 (5.26 per match)
- Top goalscorer: Mieczysław Batsch (17 goals)
- Biggest home win: Pogoń 13–0 Lauda
- Biggest away win: Lublin 0–8 Pogoń
- Highest scoring: Pogoń 13–0 Lauda
- Longest winning run: 7 matches Pogoń
- Longest unbeaten run: 7 matches Pogoń
- Longest winless run: 6 matches Iskra
- Longest losing run: 6 matches Iskra
- Highest attendance: 8,500; Pogoń 3–0 Wisła (14 October 1923)

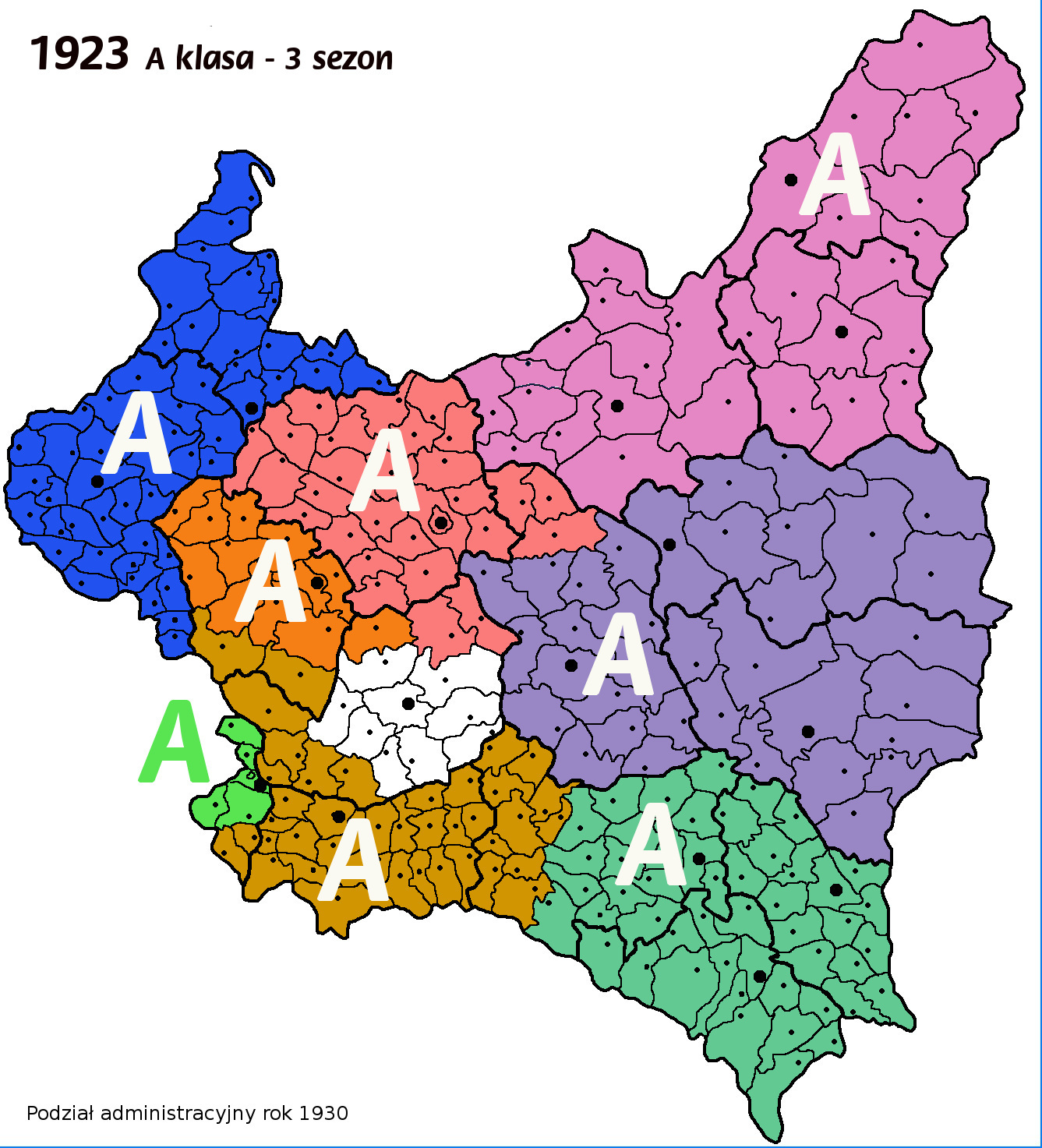
Eight regional A-Classes, whose winners competed in the national championship.

1923 Polish Football Championship was the 4th edition of the Polish Football Championship (Non-League) and 3rd completed season ended with the selection of a winner. The championship was decided in final tournament played among eight teams (winners of the regional A-Class championship) participated in the league which was divided into 2 groups: an Eastern and a Western one. The winners of both groups, Pogoń Lwów and Wisła Kraków, played a 2 leg final match for the title (and one additional match on neutral ground in Warsaw). The champions were Pogoń Lwów, who won their 2nd Polish title.

By the PZPN decision, the next Polish championships were not to take place until 1925, because the Polish championships in 1924 were abandoned as a result of preparations of the Poland national team to participate in the 1924 Olympic Football Tournament.

== Competition modus ==
The final tournaments started on 12 August 1923 and concluded on 4 November 1923 (spring-autumn system). In each of groups the season was played as a round-robin tournament. A total of 8 teams participated. Each team played a total of 6 matches, half at home and half away, two games against each other team. Teams received two points for a win and one point for a draw. The winners of both groups played a 2 leg final match for the title.

== Final tournament tables ==
=== Eastern Group ===
Pos	Team	Pld	W	D	L	GF	GA	GD	Pts
1	Pogoń Lwów ↑	6	6	0	0	42	3	+39	12
2	Polonia Warsaw	6	4	0	2	24	12	+12	8
3	Lauda Wilno	6	1	1	4	4	26	−22	3
4	WKS Lublin	6	0	1	5	1	39	−38	1

Source: rsssf.com

=== Western Group ===
Pos	Team	Pld	W	D	L	GF	GA	GD	Pts
1	Wisła Kraków ↑	6	4	1	1	20	6	+14	9
2	Warta Poznań	6	3	2	1	20	9	+11	8
3	ŁKS Łódź	6	3	1	2	21	11	+10	7
4	Iskra Siemianowice	6	0	0	6	1	36	−35	0

Source: rsssf.com

=== Final matches ===
14 October 1923
15:00

Pogoń Lwów	3–0	Wisła Kraków
Wa. Kuchar 39', 64'; Garbień 62'	Report

Park Sportowy, Lwów
Attendance: 8,500
Referee: Aleksander Rząsa (Kraków)

21 October 1923
14:30

Wisła Kraków	2–1	Pogoń Lwów
Reyman 17'; W. Kowalski 61'	Report	Wa. Kuchar 63'

Stadion Wisły, Kraków
Attendance: 4,000
Referee: Aleksander Rząsa (Kraków)

4 November 1923
14:00

Pogoń Lwów	2–1 (a.e.t.)	Wisła Kraków
Wa. Kuchar 44'; Garbień 118'	Report	Reyman 46'

Park Sobieskiego na Agrykoli, Warsaw
Attendance: 5,000
Referee: Artur Marczewski (Łódź)

== Top goalscorers ==
Rank	Player	Club	Goals
1	(Poland) Mieczysław Batsch	Pogoń Lwów	17
2	(Poland) Józef Garbień	Pogoń Lwów	10
3	(Poland) Wacław Kuchar	Pogoń Lwów	9

== Bibliography ==
- Gowarzewski, Andrzej (2000). Encyklopedia Piłkarska Fuji. Liga Polska. O tytuł mistrza Polski 1920–2000 (in Polish). GiA, Katowice. ISBN 83-88232-02-9.
- Gowarzewski, Andrzej (1994). Encyklopedia Piłkarska Fuji. 75 lat PZPN. Księga jubileuszowa (in Polish). GiA, Katowice. ISBN 83-902751-1-2.
- Gowarzewski, Andrzej (2000). Encyklopedia Piłkarska Fuji. Album 80 lat PZPN (in Polish). GiA, Katowice.
- Gowarzewski, Andrzej (2010). Encyklopedia Piłkarska Fuji. Album 90 lat PZPN (in Polish). GiA, Katowice.
