= Stanisław Ziemiański =

Polish footballer and referee (1892–1965)

Personal information
- Full name: Stanisław vel Moskal Ziemiański
- Date of birth: 7 April 1892
- Place of birth: Kraków, Austria-Hungary
- Date of death: 10 July 1965 (aged 73)
- Position: Midfielder

Senior career*
Years	Team	Apps	(Gls)
1911–1921	Wisła Kraków		
1913	Cracovia		
- * Club domestic league appearances and goals

Stanisław vel Moskal Ziemiański (7 April 1892 – 10 July 1965) was a Polish footballer and referee. During his career, he played for Wisła Kraków (1911–1921) and Cracovia (1913). Later, he worked as referee and an executive.

== Bibliography ==
- Gowarzewski, Andrzej (1991). Encyklopedia piłkarska FUJI. 2 (in Polish). Katowice: GiA. p. 26. ISBN 83-900277-1-2.
