= 20th Infantry Regiment (Poland) =

20th Land of Kraków Infantry Regiment (Polish: 20 Pulk Piechoty Ziemi Krakowskiej, 20 pp) was an infantry regiment of the Polish Army. It existed from late 1918 until September 1939. Garrisoned in Kraków, the unit belonged to the 6th Infantry Division from Kraków. During the 1939 Invasion of Poland, the regiment, together with its division, belonged to Kraków Army.

The history of the regiment dates back to early November 1918, when a group of ethnic Polish soldiers of the former Austro-Hungarian 16th Rifle Regiment came from Opava to Kraków. After additional battalions arrived at Kraków, formation of the Land of Kraków Infantry Regiment began in early 1919. On April 4, the new unit was named the 20th Land of Kraków Infantry Regiment, and was incorporated into the 6th Infantry Division.

The flag of the regiment was handed to it in Kraków by President Stanislaw Wojciechowski, on May 18, 1924. It was funded by the residents of Kraków and nearby towns. In September 1939, the flag was taken to Romania, and then to England. It is now kept at the Polish Institute of General Sikorski in London.

== Sources ==
- Kazimierz Satora: Opowieści wrześniowych sztandarów. Warsaw: Instytut Wydawniczy Pax, 1990
- Zdzisław Jagiełło: Piechota Wojska Polskiego 1918–1939. Warsaw: Bellona, 2007

== See also ==
- 1939 Infantry Regiment (Poland)
