= Marian Kiliński =

Polish footballer

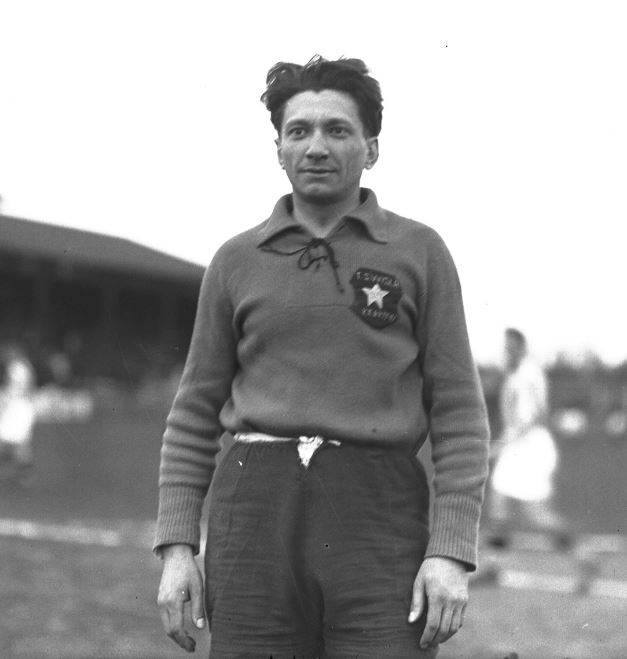
- Kiliński in 1933

Personal information
- Date of birth: 2 July 1904
- Place of birth: Kraków, Poland
- Date of death: 19 April 1995 (aged 90)
- Place of death: Kraków, Poland
- Height: 1.76 m (5 ft 9 in)
- Position: Goalkeeper

Senior career*
Years	Team	Apps	(Gls)
1922–1933	Wisła Kraków		

International career
1924	Poland	1	(0)
- * Club domestic league appearances and goals

Marian Kiliński (2 July 1904 – 19 April 1995) was a Polish footballer who played as a goalkeeper. He played in one match for the Poland national football team in 1924.
