= Marian Markiewicz =

Polish footballer

Personal information
- Date of birth: 8 December 1895
- Place of birth: Kraków, Austria-Hungary
- Date of death: 14 December 1965 (aged 70)
- Place of death: Kraków, Poland
- Height: 1.74 m (5 ft 9 in)
- Position: Defender

Senior career*
Years	Team	Apps	(Gls)
1918–1926	Wisła Kraków		
1926	Wilia Wilno		
1927–1928	WKS 20 pp		

International career
1924	Poland	3	(0)
- * Club domestic league appearances and goals

Marian Markiewicz (8 December 1895 – 14 December 1965) was a Polish footballer who played as a defender.

He played in three matches for the Poland national football team in 1924. He was also part of Poland's squad for the football tournament at the 1924 Summer Olympics, but he did not play in any matches.

A member of Józef Piłsudzki's Polish Legions, he fought in the Polish-Soviet War and the Polish September Campaign. Following Warsaw's surrender at the end of September 1939, he spent the rest of World War II as a German prisoner of war.
