= Władysław Krupa =

Polish footballer

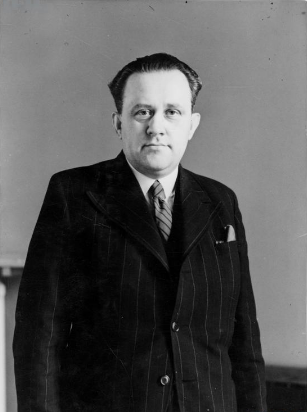

Personal information
- Date of birth: 29 December 1899
- Place of birth: Kraków, Austria-Hungary
- Date of death: 22 March 1969 (aged 69)
- Place of death: Bochnia, Poland
- Height: 1.82 m (6 ft 0 in)
- Position: Midfielder

Senior career*
Years	Team	Apps	(Gls)
1921–1927	Wisła Kraków		
1927–1928	Bocheński KS		

International career
1924	Poland	1	(0)
- * Club domestic league appearances and goals

Władysław Krupa (29 December 1899 – 22 March 1969) was a Polish footballer who played as a midfielder.

He played in one match for the Poland national team in 1924.

== Honours ==
Wisła Kraków

- Ekstraklasa: 1927
- Polish Cup: 1925–26
