= Józef Lustgarten =

Polish footballer (1889–1973)

Personal information
- Date of birth: 1 November 1889
- Place of birth: Kraków, Austria-Hungary
- Date of death: 22 September 1973 (aged 83)
- Place of death: Kraków, Poland
- Positions: Goalkeeper; left midfielder; forward

Senior career*
Years	Team	Apps	(Gls)
1906–1911	Cracovia		
1912–1918	Cracovia		

Managerial career
- 1912–1914: Cracovia (informal)
- 1922: Poland
- * Club domestic league appearances and goals

Józef Lustgarten (1 November 1889 – 22 September 1973) was a Polish Jewish footballer.

== BIography ==
Born in Kraków, he was Jewish. He represented Cracovia. He also represented Poland in international matches. He was the first manager of the Poland national football team in 1922.

During World War II, he was arrested in Lwów in 1939 by the Soviet NKVD, and sent to the Gulag, where he spent 17 years in forced labor camps. After returning to Poland, he became the honorary president of Cracovia.

== See also ==
- List of select Jewish football players
