= Mieczysław Batsch =

Polish footballer (1900–1977)

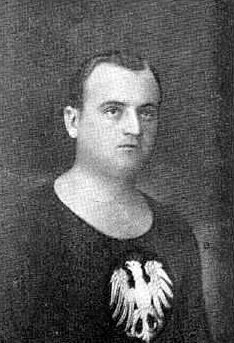

Personal information
- Full name: Mieczysław Józef Batsch
- Date of birth: 1 January 1900
- Place of birth: Lemberg, Austria-Hungary
- Date of death: 27 September 1977 (aged 77)
- Place of death: Przemyśl, Poland
- Height: 1.76 m (5 ft 9 in)
- Position: Forward

Senior career*
Years	Team	Apps	(Gls)
1916–1929	Pogoń Lwów		
1931–1935	Oldboye Lwów		

International career
1923–1926	Poland	11	(8)
- * Club domestic league appearances and goals

Mieczysław Józef Batsch a.k.a. Bacz (1 January 1900 – 27 September 1977) was a Polish footballer who played as a forward. He represented Pogoń Lwów, Oldboye Lwów and the Poland national team.

Batsch was a graduate of the mechanical engineering program of Lwów's Technical University (Politechnika Lwowska).

In the 1920s, while he was on the team, Pogoń won multiple national champions (1922, 1923, 1925, 1926). Together with Wacław Kuchar and Józef Garbień, he scored several goals. His career lasted from 1916 to 1929, after which he occasionally played on the team Oldboye Lwów, which consisted of experienced players from Lwów.

On the national team he played in 11 games, scoring 1 goal. Batsch was a member of the side that participated in the 1924 Summer Olympics in Paris.

== Honours ==
Pogoń Lwów

- Polish Football Championship: 1922, 1923, 1925, 1926
