= Adam Obrubański =

Polish footballer and official

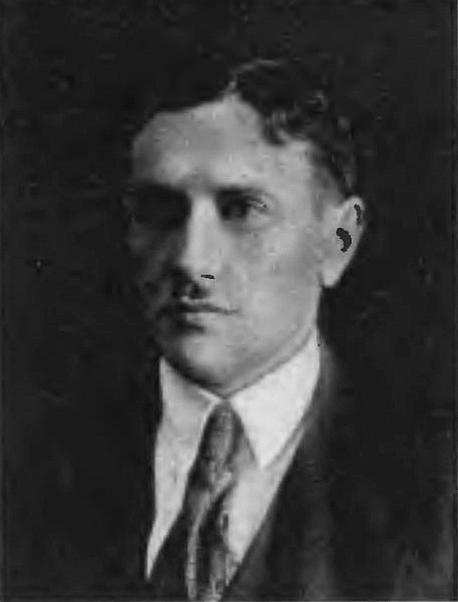
Adam Obrubańsk (−1928)

Adam Obrubański (18 December 1892 – April 1940) was a Polish football player and official, also a graduate of Kraków’s renowned Jagiellonian University.

Born in Kopychyntsi, Ukraine in 1892, he was a student at the Faculty of Philosophy and later at the Faculty of Law. In the years 1914–1922 he served in the Austrian and later the Polish Army. Then, he worked as a reporter for Kraków's Ilustrowany Kurier Codzienny daily. In 1932 he took his PhD in law at Jagiellonian University.

After retiring from an active football career (Obrubański represented Wisła Kraków and ŁKS Łódź), he became an influential official of the Polish Football Association and manager of the Poland national team as well as a referee. He was the first Pole to achieve the status of an international football referee. Obrubański officiated in the Olympic Football Tournament in 1924.

Obrubański died during the Second World War some time at Katyn in April 1940, aged 47, murdered by the Soviets in the Katyn Massacre.
