= Witold Gieras =

Polish footballer

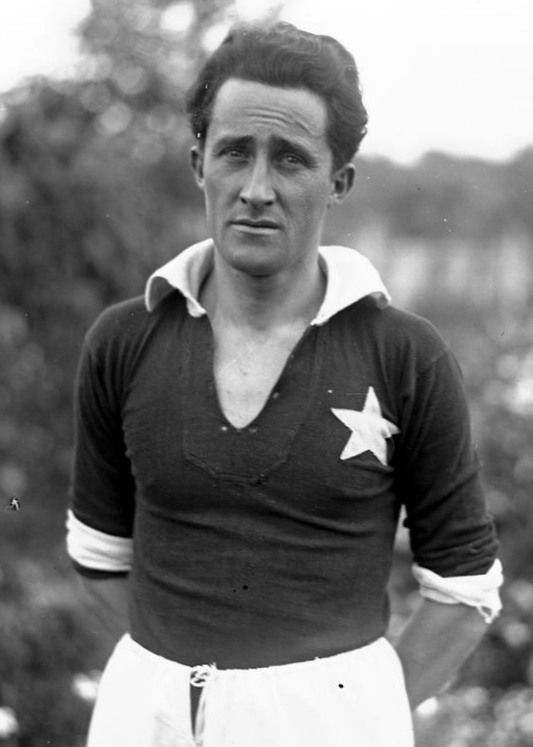

Personal information
- Date of birth: 23 June 1897
- Place of birth: Kraków, Poland
- Date of death: 2 April 1985 (aged 87)
- Place of death: Kraków, Poland
- Height: 1.75 m (5 ft 9 in)
- Position: Midfielder

Senior career*
Years	Team	Apps	(Gls)
1920–1923	Wisła Kraków		
1923–1924	Czarni Lwów		
1924–1928	Wisła Kraków		

International career
1923–1925	Poland	3	(0)
- * Club domestic league appearances and goals

Witold Gieras (23 June 1897 – 2 April 1985) was a Polish footballer who played as a midfielder. He played in three matches for the Poland national football team from 1923 to 1925.

== Honours ==
Wisła Kraków

- Ekstraklasa: 1928
- Polish Cup: 1925–26
