= Józef Garbień =

Polish footballer

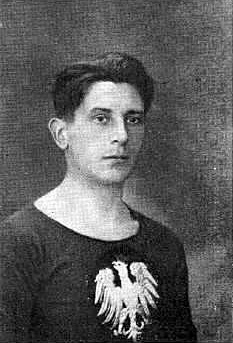
- Garbień circa 1925

Personal information
- Full name: Józef Daniel Garbień
- Date of birth: 11 December 1896
- Place of birth: Łupków, Austria-Hungary
- Date of death: 3 May 1954 (aged 57)
- Place of death: Cieszyn, Poland
- Height: 1.78 m (5 ft 10 in)
- Position: Forward

Senior career*
Years	Team	Apps	(Gls)
1910–1914	Pogoń Stryj		
1915	Sokół Lwów		
1916–1928	Pogoń Lwów		
1931–1933	Oldboye Lwów		

International career
1922–1926	Poland	8	(2)
- * Club domestic league appearances and goals

Józef Daniel Garbień (11 December 1896 — 3 May 1954) was a Polish footballer who played as a forward. He was part of Pogoń Lwów from 1916 to 1928.

Garbien was born in Łupków (near Sanok). Apart from playing football, he was a physician, a 1924 graduate of Lwów's Jan Kazimierz University.

His career started on Pogoń Stryj. In 1916 he moved to Pogoń Lwów, where remained until 1928 (then, until 1933, he played for Oldboye Lwów, a team of veteran players). With Pogoń, he was multiple champion of Poland (1922, 1923, 1925, 1926); he also played 8 games on the national team. Garbien's nickname "Tank" fully reflected his physique and style of play. He was strong and dynamic, but some sources claim that he could be too selfish on the field. After retirement from playing, in 1933 he moved to Chrzanów, where he was director of the hospital.

A member of Józef Piłsudski's Polish Legions, he fought on the Italian Front in World War I, then was severely wounded in 1919, during the conflict with Ukraine over Lwów. He participated in the Polish September Campaign as an officer of the Polish Army. During the Nazi occupation of Poland he was an active member of the underground, was captured by the Gestapo, and spent several months in the Gestapo's notorious prison on Montelupi Street in Kraków.

After World War II he was captured by the Communists and incarcerated for his alleged anti-Soviet attitude. Released, he settled in Chorzów, where until 1949 he was a director of a local hospital. He died in Cieszyn.

== Honours ==
Pogoń Lwów

- Polish Football Championship: 1922, 1923, 1925, 1926
