= Jutrzenka Kraków =

Interwar Jewish football club in Poland

Home colours

Jutrzenka Kraków was a Jewish minority Polish football club during the interwar period. The club existed until 1939. Fans and players of the club were generally associated with the Bund political party. The main rival of Jutrzenka was the club Makkabi Kraków, which was associated with the Zionist movement and political parties. The matches between the two teams were generally referred to as "Holy War" long before that became a common reference to matches between Cracovia and Wisła.

Józef Klotz played for Jutrzenka Kraków, which he joined as a youth team player and played for from 1912 to 1925. Jutrzenka played one season in I liga in 1927 when it took the last, fourteenth place. Another success of Jutrzenka was placing second in A-Class (the highest level for soccer in the Kraków region) in 1924, behind Wisła Kraków and just ahead of Cracovia.

Jutrzenka's stadium was located at the present site of the stadium of Wisła Kraków.

The animosity between Jutrzenka and Makkabi was sufficiently intense that in arguments within KOZPN (the organization of Kraków area soccer teams), the Zionist Makkabi often made tactical alliances with the somewhat antisemitic Wisła (Wisła's charter banned non-Catholic players from its ranks) against Jutrzenka and its more democratic ally Cracovia. In general, for political and social reasons, Jutrzenka was associated with Cracovia while Makkabi was associated with Wisła (the intense rivalry between Cracovia and Wisła persists to this day).

== Notable players ==
- Ludwik Gintel (1899–1973), Polish-Israeli Olympic footballer
- Józef Klotz (1900–1941), Polish footballer; killed in the Warsaw Ghetto
