= Kazimierz Kaczor (footballer) =

Polish footballer

Personal information
- Date of birth: 24 November 1895
- Place of birth: Kraków, Austria-Hungary
- Date of death: 17 April 1972 (aged 76)
- Place of death: Kraków, Poland
- Height: 1.82 m (6 ft 0 in)
- Position: Defender

Senior career*
Years	Team	Apps	(Gls)
1911–1912	Robotniczy KS Kraków		
1913–1927	Wisła Kraków		

International career
1923–1925	Poland	3	(0)
- * Club domestic league appearances and goals

Kazimierz Kaczor (24 November 1895 – 17 April 1972) was a Polish footballer who played as a defender.

He made three appearances for the Poland national team from 1923 to 1925.

== Honours ==
Wisła Kraków

- Ekstraklasa: 1927
- Polish Cup: 1925–26
