= 1932 Ekstraklasa =

12th season of top-tier football league in Poland

Liga
- Season: 1932
- Champions: KS Cracovia (3rd title)
- Relegated: Polonia Warsaw
- Top goalscorer: Kajetan Kryszkiewicz (16 goals)

Statistics of Ekstraklasa for the 1932 season.

== Overview ==
It was contested by 12 teams, and Cracovia won its third title.

== League table ==
Pos	Team	Pld	W	D	L	GF	GA	GD	Pts
1	KS Cracovia (C)	22	12	5	5	55	30	+25	29
2	Pogoń Lwów	22	13	2	7	32	24	+8	28
3	Warta Poznań	22	13	1	8	55	37	+18	27
4	ŁKS Łódź	22	11	4	7	50	32	+18	26
5	Legia Warsaw	22	10	3	9	37	25	+12	23
6	Wisła Kraków	22	9	4	9	37	42	−5	22
7	Ruch Chorzów	22	8	4	10	33	35	−2	20
8	Warszawianka Warszawa	22	8	4	10	27	47	−20	20
9	WKS 22 pp Siedlce	22	7	5	10	36	47	−11	19
10	Garbarnia Kraków	22	7	4	11	39	43	−4	18
11	Czarni Lwów	22	6	4	12	24	39	−15	16
12	Polonia Warsaw (R)	22	6	4	12	27	51	−24	16

Source: 90minut.pl (in Polish)
(C) Champions; (R) Relegated

== Results ==
Home \ Away	2PP	CRA	CZA	GAR	LEG	ŁKS	POG	PWA	RUC	WAW	WAR	WIS
22 pp Siedlce		2–2	3–0	2–1	1–1	1–2	2–4	1–2	0–1	2–2	3–2	3–0
Cracovia	3–1		4–1	5–0	2–0	3–1	2–1	6–2	1–3	5–1	0–1	3–0
Czarni Lwów	1–2	0–3		2–1	0–4	0–3	0–1	3–0	6–1	1–0	2–0	2–2
Garbarnia Kraków	1–2	4–0	1–2		0–2	1–6	2–1	6–1	0–0	4–2	4–3	1–2
Legia Warsaw	1–0	0–1	2–0	1–1		4–1	1–2	0–1	2–1	2–3	1–3	2–3
ŁKS Łódź	4–1	4–1	1–1	1–1	1–2		3–0	3–1	6–0	3–2	2–0	2–0
Pogoń Lwów	3–0	1–1	1–0	2–1	0–0	1–0		3–0	2–1	2–0	2–1	1–0
Polonia Warsaw	2–2	2–2	1–1	1–5	1–5	2–2	0–2		2–1	4–0	2–1	0–1
Ruch Chorzów	1–2	1–1	2–2	2–0	1–0	3–0	3–1	1–2		4–1	0–3	5–0
Warszawianka	2–2	0–6	3–0	0–1	2–1	1–1	1–0	2–1	1–0		2–1	0–6
Warta Poznań	7–2	3–2	1–0	4–2	1–5	5–3	4–1	2–0	2–1	0–0		8–3
Wisła Kraków	5–2	2–2	3–0	2–2	0–1	2–1	2–1	2–0	1–1	1–2	0–3	

Source: 90minut.pl (in Polish)
Legend: Blue = home team win; Yellow = draw; Red = away team win.
