= 1930 Ekstraklasa =

10th season of top-tier football league in Poland

Liga
- Season: 1930
- Champions: KS Cracovia (2nd title)
- Relegated: ŁTSG Łódź
- Goals scored: 508
- Top goalscorer: Karol Kossok (24 goals)

Statistics of Ekstraklasa for the 1930 season.

== Overview ==
It contested by 12 teams, and KS Cracovia won the championship.

== League table ==
Pos	Team	Pld	W	D	L	GF	GA	GD	Pts
1	KS Cracovia (C)	22	16	1	5	46	22	+24	33
2	Wisła Kraków	22	14	4	4	53	34	+19	32
3	Legia Warsaw	22	12	6	4	67	27	+40	30
4	Polonia Warsaw	22	10	6	6	59	39	+20	26
5	Warta Poznań	22	11	4	7	50	37	+13	26
6	Garbarnia Kraków	22	8	5	9	50	49	+1	21
7	Pogoń Lwów	22	4	11	7	34	36	−2	19
8	Ruch Chorzów	22	7	5	10	34	51	−17	19
9	Czarni Lwów	22	5	9	8	25	40	−15	19
10	ŁKS Łódź	22	6	3	13	38	40	−2	15
11	Warszawianka Warszawa	22	4	4	14	27	66	−39	12
12	ŁTSG Łódź (R)	22	3	6	13	25	67	−42	12

Source: 90minut.pl (in Polish)
(C) Champions; (R) Relegated

== Results ==
Home \ Away	CRA	CZA	GAR	LEG	ŁKS	ŁTS	POG	PWA	RUC	WAW	WAR	WIS
Cracovia		2–1	2–1	2–3	1–0	3–1	3–0	3–2	3–0	3–0	1–4	0–1
Czarni Lwów	1–2		2–1	0–0	0–0	0–0	1–0	0–2	2–1	0–2	3–1	4–2
Garbarnia Kraków	2–3	5–2		3–2	2–0	4–1	4–0	3–3	4–2	1–3	1–1	1–3
Legia Warsaw	2–2	1–1	3–1		3–2	8–0	1–1	8–4	7–1	6–0	4–0	3–2
ŁKS Łódź	0–1	3–1	5–1	1–5		1–1	3–3	0–1	5–0	7–0	1–4	0–2
ŁTSG Łódź	0–5	0–0	2–4	0–3	0–2		2–1	0–0	2–3	2–2	3–2	1–4
Pogoń Lwów	0–2	0–0	0–0	0–0	2–1	8–2		1–1	2–2	5–0	3–0	2–2
Polonia Warsaw	0–3 (Note: Match awarded.)	7–0	5–1	3–1	4–2	2–2	2–2		4–1	4–1	5–0	3–4
Ruch Chorzów	1–0	1–1	2–2	1–1	4–0	3–1	4–1	2–1		2–1	2–2	0–4
Warszawianka	1–3	1–1	2–2	0–5	1–4	2–4	2–2	0–3	1–0		4–0	1–5
Warta Poznań	1–0	4–0	5–1	2–1	3–1	9–1	1–1	3–1	3–0	4–2		0–1
Wisła Kraków	1–2	5–5	1–6	1–0	1–0	1–0	3–0	2–2	4–2	3–1	1–1	

Source: 90minut.pl (in Polish)
Legend: Blue = home team win; Yellow = draw; Red = away team win.
