= Władysław Kowalski (footballer) =

Polish footballer (1897–1939)

Personal information
- Date of birth: 17 April 1897
- Place of birth: Zwierzyniec, Kraków, Austria-Hungary
- Date of death: 21 September 1939 (aged 42)
- Place of death: Wołczatycze, Poland
- Position: Forward

Senior career*
| Years | Team | Apps | (Gls) |
| –1919 | Wisła Kraków | | |
| 1920–1921 | WKS Warsaw | | |
| 1922–1932 | Wisła Kraków | | |

International career
| 1923–1924 | Poland | 4 | (2) |
- * Club domestic league appearances and goals

Władysław Kowalski (17 April 1897 – 21 September 1939) was a Polish footballer who played as a forward for Wisła Kraków and WKS Warsaw. He made four appearances for the Poland national team from 1923 to 1924. A Polish Army officer, serving as an adjutant, Kowalski was taken prisoner during the Soviet invasion of Poland, when trying to flee to Hungary, and was executed by Soviet soldiers.

== Honours ==
Wisła Kraków

- Ekstraklasa: 1927, 1928
- Polish Cup: 1925–26
