= Józef Adamek =

Polish footballer

Personal information
- Full name: Józef Janusz Adamek
- Date of birth: 21 February 1900
- Place of birth: Kraków, Austria-Hungary
- Date of death: 1 October 1974 (aged 74)
- Place of death: Kraków, Poland
- Height: 1.76 m (5 ft 9 in)
- Position: Forward

Youth career
- 1913–1923: Wisła Kraków

Senior career*
Years	Team	Apps	(Gls)
1923–1933	Wisła Kraków		

International career
1924–1930	Poland	9	(2)
- * Club domestic league appearances and goals

Józef Janusz Adamek (21 February 1900 – 1 October 1974) was a Polish footballer who played as a forward.

He played in nine matches for the Poland national team between 1924 and 1930, representing his country at the 1924 Summer Olympics.

== Honours ==
Wisła Kraków

- Ekstraklasa: 1927, 1928
- Polish Cup: 1925–26
