= Wawel Kraków =

Polish sports club

- Full name: Wojskowy Klub Sportowy; Wawel Kraków
- Nickname(s): Wojskowi (The Militarians)
- Founded: 13 July 1919; 106 years ago
- Ground: WKS Wawel Stadium
- Capacity: 1,170
- Chairman: Piotr Ludwig
- Manager: Jerzy Urban
- League: Klasa B Kraków II
- 2023–24: Klasa B Kraków II, 4th of 9
- Website: https://wkswawel.pl
Home colours

Wawel Kraków is a Polish multisports club based in Kraków, Poland. It was founded in 1919. Wawel Kraków was the first Polish club to win the Young Leaders Rally Cup back in 1952. They won the final against their rivals from Cracovia by beating them 5–1.

The club was founded in 1919. In 1928, it merged with Wojskowy Klub Sportowy (Military Sports Club, WKS) and took on the name WKS Wawel. For most of its history, Wawel was an organization supported by Kraków garrison of the Polish Army. It still keeps its traditional name of Military Sports Club, even though since 1 January 2002 it is no longer supported by the army. Currently, WKS Wawel has seven departments: track and field, football, volleyball, cross country running, parachuting and tennis.

Over the years, Wawel's athletes won several medals at different competitions, including 4 gold Olympic medals of Robert Korzeniowski (Atlanta 1996, Sydney 2000, Athens 2004). Furthermore, Korzeniowski won 3 gold medals at World Championships (Athens 1997, Edmonton 2001, Paris 2003), and 2 at European Championships (Budapest 1998, Munich 2002).

Among other achievements of Wawel's athletes are:

- bronze medal of gymnasts Helena Rakoczy, Danuta Stachow and Barbara Slizowska at 1956 Olympics in Melbourne,
- 4 world titles of gymnast Helena Rakoczy,
- several medals of sport shooter Wieslaw Gawlikowski,
- several medals of athlete Henryk Szordykowski.
- Wawel's football team was the 1952 Polish Ekstraklasa runner up. After the 1953 season, Wawel was withdrawn from the Ekstraklasa, as army authorities decided that Legia Warszawa should be the only military-sponsored team in the league.

== Honours ==
- Ekstraklasa
  - Runners-up: 1953
- Polish Cup
  - Quarter-finalists: 1952, 1965
- Young Leaders Rally Cup
  - Winners: 1952
