= 1929 Wisła Kraków season =

Wisła Kraków
1929 season
- Chairman: Zygmunt Bieżeński
- Manager: František Koželuh (from 31 March 1929)
- Ekstraklasa: 3rd
- Top goalscorer: Henryk Reyman (16 goals)

The 1929 season was Wisła Kraków's 21st year as a club.

== Friendlies ==
18 March 1929	Legja Kraków (Poland)	1–8	(Poland) Wisła Kraków	Kraków, Poland
11:30 CET (UTC+1)		Report	W. Kowalski; W. Krupa; Nowosielski; Adamek	Stadium: Boisko Legji; Referee: Roman Berwald (Kraków)

24 March 1929	Wisła Kraków (Poland)	2–2	(Poland) Garbarnia Kraków	Kraków, Poland
15:30 CET (UTC+1)	Jó. Kotlarczyk; J. Krupa	Report	Joksch	Stadium: Stadion Wisły; Referee: Antoni Jedliński (Kraków)

14 April 1929	BBSV Bielsko (Poland)	1–5	(Poland) Wisła Kraków	Bielsko, Poland
		Report		Referee: Julian Kołodziej (Bielsko)

1 May 1929	Wisła Kraków (Poland)	3–1	(Poland) Makkabi Kraków	Kraków, Poland
17:00 CET (UTC+1)	Czulak; Nowosielski; W. Kowalski	Report		Stadium: Stadion Wisły

12 May 1929	Wisła Kraków (Poland)	1–1	(Poland) KS Cracovia	Kraków, Poland
17:00 CET (UTC+1)	W. Kowalski 66'	Report	Sperling 40'	Stadium: Stadion Wisły; Attendance: 5,000; Referee: Rudolf Brzeziński (Poznań)

19 May 1929	Legja Poznań (Poland)	0–1	(Poland) Wisła Kraków	Poznań, Poland
		Report	Balcer 39'	Attendance: 1,500

20 May 1929	KKS Pogoń/Legja Poznań (Poland)	2–2	(Poland) Wisła Kraków	Poznań, Poland
	Pawlak; Śmigłak	Report	Nowosielski 20'; Balcer 53'	Attendance: 1,000; Referee: Franciszek Baranowski (Poznań)

22 June 1929	VfB Leipzig (Germany)	1–2	(Poland) Wisła Kraków	Leipzig, Germany
		Report	Martyna 30' (pen.); Balcer 55'

23 June 1929	Guts Muts Dresden (Germany)	1–2	(Poland) Wisła Kraków	Dresden, Germany
		Report	Adamek 22'; Łańko ??'	Attendance: 2,500

13 August 1929	Wisła Kraków (Poland)	4–0	(Netherlands) PSV Eindhoven	Kraków, Poland
17:30 CET (UTC+1)	Jan Kotlarczyk; Balcer; Czulak; Jó. Kotlarczyk	Report		Stadium: Stadion Wisły; Attendance: 2,000; Referee: Ferdynand Arczyński (Kraków)

14 September 1929	Makkabi Kraków (Poland)	1–5	(Poland) Wisła Kraków	Kraków, Poland
16:15 CET (UTC+1)	Osiek	Report	Stefaniuk; Lubowiecki; Ketz	Stadium: Stadion Makkabi; Referee: Tadeusz Makary (Kraków)

3 November 1929	Repr. Klubów Żydowskich (Poland)	1–3	(Poland) Wisła Kraków	Kraków, Poland
		Report

1 December 1929	Wisła Kraków (Poland)	3–1	(Poland) Wawel Kraków	Kraków, Poland
11:30 CET (UTC+1)	Ketz	Report	Piątek	Stadium: Stadion Wisły

8 December 1929	Hakoah Bielsko (Poland)	0–4	(Poland) Wisła Kraków	Bielsko, Poland
		Report	Ketz; Czulak	Attendance: 2,000

== Ekstraklasa ==
31 March 1929 1	Wisła Kraków	4–2	KS Warszawianka	Kraków
15:45 CET (UTC+1)	H. Reyman 15', (penalty missed) ??'; W. Kowalski (penalty missed) ??', 78'; Balcer 41', 52'	Report	Jung 29', 61'	Stadium: Stadion Wisły; Attendance: 2,000; Referee: Bronisław Grabowski (Lwów)

7 April 1929 2	ŁKS Łódź	2–2	Wisła Kraków	Łódź
16:00 CET (UTC+1)	Śledź 30'; Król 83'	Report	H. Reyman 15'; W. Kowalski 50'	Stadium: Stadion ŁKS-u; Attendance: 1,500; Referee: Józef Baran-Bilewski (Warsaw)

21 April 1929 3	Pogoń Lwów	2–4	Wisła Kraków	Lwów
16:00 CET (UTC+1)	Batsch 2'; Szabakiewicz 20'	Report	W. Kowalski 4', 6'; Adamek 37'; Czulak 90'	Stadium: Stadion Pogoni; Attendance: 3,000; Referee: Józef Baran-Bilewski (Warsaw)

28 April 1929 4	Wisła Kraków	2–0	Legia Warsaw	Kraków
16:15 CET (UTC+1)	H. Reyman 34'; Czulak 75'	Report		Stadium: Stadion Wisły; Attendance: 4,000; Referee: Zygmunt Hanke (Łódź)

5 May 1929 5	Wisła Kraków	5–2	Garbarnia Kraków	Kraków
17:00 CET (UTC+1)	H. Reyman 18', 25'; Balcer 23'; W. Kowalski 58'; Adamek 76'	Report	Joksch 4'; Bill 43'	Stadium: Stadion Wisły; Attendance: 6,000; Referee: Emil Niedźwirski (Lwów)

9 May 1929 6	Wisła Kraków	4–4	Czarni Lwów	Kraków
17:00 CET (UTC+1)	H. Reyman 18'; W. Kowalski 29', 32'; Czulak 85'	Report	Nastula 10', 28'; Witkowski 57'; J. Reyman 68'	Stadium: Stadion Wisły; Attendance: 3,000; Referee: Józef Baran-Bilewski (Warsaw)

26 May 1929 7	Wisła Kraków	4–2	Polonia Warsaw	Kraków
17:30 CET (UTC+1)	H. Reyman 29', 75'; Adamek 44'; W. Kowalski 65'	Report	Szczepaniak 6'; Suchocki 55'	Stadium: Stadion Wisły; Attendance: 2,500; Referee: Longin Dudryk (Lwów)

30 May 1929 8	Ruch Hajduki Wielkie	2–2	Wisła Kraków	Królewska Huta
	Sobotta 42'; Peterek 75' (pen.)	Report	H. Reyman 12'; Balcer 57'	Stadium: Stadion AKS-u; Attendance: 3,000; Referee: Janusz Mallow (Poznań)

9 June 1929 9	KS Cracovia	3–1	Wisła Kraków	Kraków
18:00 CET (UTC+1)	Kubiński 17'; Rusin 20'; Kossok 40'	Report	S. Reyman 10'	Stadium: Stadion Cracovii; Attendance: 8,000; Referee: Artur Marczewski (Łódź)

16 June 1929 10	Warta Poznań	5–0	Wisła Kraków	Poznań
17:30 CET (UTC+1)	Przybysz 62', 78', 79'; Scherfke 73', 82'	Report		Stadium: Stadion Warty; Attendance: 5,000; Referee: Adolf Słomczyński (Sosnowiec)

29 June 1929 11	Wisła Kraków	5–0	Klub Turystów Łódź	Kraków
17:45 CET (UTC+1)	H. Reyman 30', 58', 70'; W. Kowalski ??'; Adamek ??'	Report		Stadium: Stadion Wisły; Attendance: 2,500; Referee: Tadeusz Walczak (Warsaw)

14 July 1929 12	Wisła Kraków	2–1	1. FC Katowice	Kraków
17:30 CET (UTC+1)	Ketz 19'; Balcer 41'	Report	Pośpiech 10', (red card) ??'	Stadium: Stadion Wisły; Attendance: 5,000; Referee: Adam Nawrocki (Poznań)

21 July 1929 13	Wisła Kraków	5–1	Ruch Hajduki Wielkie	Kraków
17:30 CET (UTC+1)	W. Kowalski 52'; Jó. Kotlarczyk 56', 86'; Jan Kotlarczyk 63'; Ketz 77'	Report	Buchwald 25'	Stadium: Stadion Wisły; Attendance: 2,000; Referee: Mieczysław Walczak (Warsaw)

11 August 1929 14	Wisła Kraków	1–4	ŁKS Łódź	Kraków
17:00 CET (UTC+1)	Skrynkowicz (penalty missed) ??'; Jó. Kotlarczyk 65'	Report	Tadeusiewicz 27'; Stollenwerk 42', 77'; Nikiel 75'	Stadium: Stadion Wisły; Attendance: 3,000; Referee: Adam Nawrocki (Poznań)

18 August 1929 15	Klub Turystów Łódź	0–3	Wisła Kraków	Łódź
		Report	Ketz 17'; Czulak 69'; Balcer 85'	Stadium: Stadion Klubu Turystów; Attendance: 1,500; Referee: Józef Baran-Bilewski (Warsaw)

25 August 1929 16	KS Warszawianka	3–2	Wisła Kraków	Warsaw
	Szenajch 35', 58'; Zwierzewski 65'	Report	Ketz 29' ? 83' (o.g.)	Stadium: Boisko DOK-u; Attendance: 3,000; Referee: Adolf Słomczyński (Sosnowiec)

1 September 1929 17	Garbarnia Kraków	1–0	Wisła Kraków	Kraków
16:30 CET (UTC+1)	Joksch 57'	Report		Stadium: Stadion Garbarni; Attendance: 3,000; Referee: Janusz Mallow (Poznań)

8 September 1929 18	Wisła Kraków	3–1	Pogoń Lwów	Kraków
16:15 CET (UTC+1)	Czulak 35'; Ketz 59', 68'	Report	Hanke 75'	Stadium: Stadion Wisły; Attendance: 4,000; Referee: Józef Baran-Bilewski (Warsaw)

22 September 1929 19	Wisła Kraków	5–1	KS Cracovia	Kraków
15:30 CET (UTC+1)	H. Reyman 12', 32', 52'; Czulak 29'; Balcer 64'	Report	Kossok 33'	Stadium: Stadion Wisły; Attendance: 6,000; Referee: Adolf Słomczyński (Sosnowiec)

29 September 1929 20	1. FC Katowice	2–4	Wisła Kraków	Katowice
	Pośpiech 15', (red card) ??'; Spałęk (red card) ??'; Dittmer 45' (pen.)	Report	Balcer 40'; Czulak 46', 55', 75'	Stadium: Stadion 1. FC; Attendance: 6,000; Referee: Józef Baran-Bilewski (Warsaw)

13 October 1929 21	Legia Warsaw	1–0	Wisła Kraków	Warsaw
	Rajdek 29'	Report		Stadium: Boisko DOK-u; Attendance: 3,000; Referee: Adam Nawrocki (Poznań)

22 October 1929 22	Czarni Lwów	4–0	Wisła Kraków	Lwów
11:00 CET (UTC+1)	Nastula 4', 62'; Sawka 16'; Czyżewski 30'	Report		Stadium: Stadion Czarnych; Attendance: 2,500; Referee: Tadeusz Walczak (Warsaw)

10 November 1929 23	Wisła Kraków	0–0	Warta Poznań	Kraków
11:30 CET (UTC+1)		Report		Stadium: Stadion Wisły; Attendance: 5,000; Referee: Kazimierz Wardęszkiewicz (Łódź)

17 November 1929 24	Polonia Warsaw	3–4	Wisła Kraków	Warsaw
	Michalski; Suchocki; Ałaszewski	Report	Balcer; H. Reyman	Stadium: Stadion Polonii; Attendance: 3,000; Referee: Franciszek Baranowski (Poznań)

== Squad, appearances and goals ==
No.	Pos	Nat	Player	Total		I Liga	
No.	Pos	Nat	Player	Apps	Goals	Apps	Goals
	GK	(Poland) POL	Marian Kiliński	2	0	2+0	0
	GK	(Poland) POL	Maksymilian Koźmin	22	0	22+0	0
	DF	(Poland) POL	Aleksander Pychowski	23	0	23+0	0
	DF	(Poland) POL	Emil Skrynkowicz	19	0	19+0	0
	DF	(Poland) POL	Antoni Zasada	1	0	1+0	0
	MF	(Poland) POL	Karol Bajorek	16	0	16+0	0
	MF	(Poland) POL	Jan Kotlarczyk	24	2	24+0	2
	MF	(Poland) POL	Józef Kotlarczyk	24	2	24+0	2
	MF	(Poland) POL	Bronisław Makowski	22	0	22+0	0
	FW	(Poland) POL	Józef Adamek	18	4	18+0	4
	FW	(Poland) POL	Mieczysław Balcer	22	11	22+0	11
	FW	(Poland) POL	Stanisław Czulak	18	10	18+0	10
	FW	(Poland) POL	Jan Ketz	10	6	9+1	6
	FW	(Poland) POL	Władysław Kowalski	14	10	14+0	10
	FW	(Poland) POL	Stefan Lubowiecki	3	0	3+0	0
	FW	(Poland) POL	Karol Nowosielski	3	1	3+0	1
	FW	(Poland) POL	Henryk Reyman	19	16	19+0	16
	FW	(Poland) POL	Stefan Reyman	3	0	3+0	0
	FW	(Poland) POL	Aleksander Stefaniuk	2	0	2+0	0

=== Goalscorers ===
Place	Position	Nation	Name	I Liga
1	FW	(Poland)	Henryk Reyman	16
2	FW	(Poland)	Mieczysław Balcer	11
3	FW	(Poland)	Władysław Kowalski	10
3	FW	(Poland)	Stanisław Czulak	10
5	FW	(Poland)	Jan Ketz	6
6	FW	(Poland)	Józef Adamek	4
6	MF	(Poland)	Jan Kotlarczyk	2
6	MF	(Poland)	Józef Kotlarczyk	2
			Total	61
