= 1930 Wisła Kraków season =

Wisła Kraków
1930 season
- Chairman: Zygmunt Bieżeński
- Ekstraklasa: 2nd
- Top goalscorer: Walerian Kisieliński (17 goals)

The 1930 season was Wisła Kraków's 22nd year as a club.

== Friendlies ==
2 March 1930	Legja Kraków (Poland)	1–7	(Poland) Wisła Kraków	Kraków, Poland
12:00 CET (UTC+1)		Report	Nowosielski; Ketz; Czulak; Adamek	Stadium: Boisko Legji

9 March 1930	Korona Kraków (Poland)	1–2	(Poland) Wisła Kraków	Kraków, Poland
11:30 CET (UTC+1)	Pankoś	Report	H. Reyman; Czulak	Stadium: Boisko Korony; Attendance: 200; Referee: Jakub Seidner (Kraków)

16 March 1930	Wisła Kraków (Poland)	9–1	(Poland) Wawel Kraków	Kraków, Poland
15:30 CET (UTC+1)	Adamek; Czulak; Lesiak; H. Reyman; Nowosielski	Report		Stadium: Stadion Wisły; Referee: Franciszek Babirecki (Kraków)

23 March 1930	Wisła Kraków (Poland)	6–0	(Poland) 06 Mysłowice	Kraków, Poland
11:00 CET (UTC+1)	H. Reyman; Czulak; Adamek; Nowosielski; Lesiak	Report		Stadium: Stadion Wisły; Attendance: 500; Referee: Stefan Burka (Kraków)

6 April 1930	Legia Warsaw (Poland)	0–1	(Poland) Wisła Kraków	Warsaw, Poland
		Report	Balcer	Attendance: 3,000; Referee: Tadeusz Walczak (Warsaw)

14 April 1930	Makkabi Kraków (Poland)	0–2	(Poland) Wisła Kraków	Kraków, Poland
16:00 CET (UTC+1)		Report	Czulak 30'; Jan Kotlarczyk 40' (pen.)	Stadium: Stadion Makkabi; Attendance: 1,000; Referee: Andrzej Rutkowski (Kraków)

4 May 1930	Pogoń Lwów (Poland)	2–2	(Poland) Wisła Kraków	Lwów, Poland
16:00 CET (UTC+1)	Zimmer; Motylewski; Hanke (penalty missed) ??'	Report	Kisieliński; H. Reyman	Stadium: Stadion Pogoni; Attendance: 2,500

9 June 1930	Fablok Chrzanów (Poland)	2–5	(Poland) Wisła Kraków	Chrzanów, Poland
		Report

24 June 1930	Hakoah Bielsko (Poland)	1–3	(Poland) Wisła Kraków	Bielsko, Poland
		Report

27 July 1930	Wisła Kraków (Poland)	5–1	(Poland) Sparta Kraków	Kraków, Poland
11:15 CET (UTC+1)	Kisieliński; H. Reyman; Stefaniuk; Sołtysik	Report		Stadium: Stadion Wisły; Attendance: 1,000

17 August 1930	Reprezentacja Zakopanego (Poland)	2–16	(Poland) Wisła Kraków	Zakopane, Poland
		Report		Stadium: Stadion RKS Giewont; Referee: Franciszek Giebartowski (Lwów)

8 October 1930	Makkabi Kraków (Poland)	1–3	(Poland) Wisła Kraków	Kraków, Poland
15:00 CET (UTC+1)	Selinger	Report	Kisieliński; Woźniak (pen.)	Stadium: Stadion Makkabi

9 November 1930	BBSV Bielsko (Poland)	1–1	(Poland) Wisła Kraków	Bielsko, Poland
	Matzner	Report	Kisieliński	Referee: Karol Schimke (Bielsko)

16 November 1930	Wisła Kraków (Poland)	1–2	(Poland) Garbarnia Kraków	Kraków, Poland
11:30 CET (UTC+1)	Balcer 40'	Report	Sycz 47'; Joksch 80'	Stadium: Stadion Wisły; Attendance: 1,500; Referee: Stefan Burka (Kraków)

4 December 1930	Wawel Kraków (Poland)	4–7	(Poland) Wisła Kraków	Kraków, Poland
		Report	Kisieliński; Woźniak; Lubowiecki

8 December 1930	Wisła Kraków (Poland)	2–1	(Poland) KS Cracovia	Kraków, Poland
11:30 CET (UTC+1)	Kisieliński 40', 50'	Report	Mitusiński 77'	Stadium: Stadion Wisły; Attendance: 6,000; Referee: Andrzej Rutkowski (Kraków)

21 December 1930	Wisła Kraków (Poland)	11–1	(Poland) Legja Kraków	Kraków, Poland
11:30 CET (UTC+1)	Kisieliński; Woźniak	Report		Stadium: Stadion Wisły

== Ekstraklasa ==
30 March 1930 1	Wisła Kraków	3–1	KS Warszawianka	Kraków
15:15 CET (UTC+1)	Lubowiecki 10'; Ketz 20'; H. Reyman 85'	Report	Piliszek 16'	Stadium: Stadion Wisły; Attendance: 5,000; Referee: Edward Gulicz (Lwów)

13 April 1930 2	Wisła Kraków	1–1	Warta Poznań	Kraków
16:00 CET (UTC+1)	Lubowiecki 81'	Report	Scherfke 1'	Stadium: Stadion Wisły; Attendance: 6,000; Referee: Adolf Słomczyński (Sosnowiec)

20 April 1930 3	Garbarnia Kraków	1–3	Wisła Kraków	Kraków
16:00 CET (UTC+1)	Smoczek 13'	Report	Czulak 34', 74'; Lubowiecki 61'	Stadium: Stadion Garbarni; Attendance: 5,000; Referee: Józef Blahut (Bielsko)

27 April 1930 4	ŁKS Łódź	0–2	Wisła Kraków	Łódź
16:00 CET (UTC+1)		Report	Balcer 32'; Lubowiecki 47'	Stadium: Stadion ŁKS-u; Attendance: 3,000; Referee: Adam Nawrocki (Poznań)

3 May 1930 5	Pogoń Lwów	2–2	Wisła Kraków	Lwów
16:00 CET (UTC+1)	Matyas 4', 35'	Report	H. Reyman 40'; Jó. Kotlarczyk 72'	Stadium: Stadion Pogoni; Attendance: 5,000; Referee: Tadeusz Walczak (Warsaw)

18 May 1930 6	Polonia Warsaw	3–4	Wisła Kraków	Warsaw
17:00 CET (UTC+1)	Kaczanowski 26'; Malik 79', 80'	Report	Adamek 35'; Kisieliński 49'; H. Reyman 51'; Makowski 52'	Stadium: Stadion Polonii; Attendance: 4,000; Referee: Kazimierz Wardęszkiewicz (Łódź)

25 May 1930 7	Wisła Kraków	1–0	ŁTS-G Łódź	Kraków
17:30 CET (UTC+1)	H. Reyman 39'	Report		Stadium: Stadion Wisły; Attendance: 2,000; Referee: Franciszek Krukowski (Warsaw)

8 June 1930 8	Wisła Kraków	1–2	KS Cracovia	Kraków
18:00 CET (UTC+1)	W. Kowalski 68'	Report	Mitusiński 16'; Gintel 42'	Stadium: Stadion Wisły; Attendance: 12,000; Referee: Adam Nawrocki (Poznań)

22 June 1930 9	Wisła Kraków	4–2	Ruch Hajduki Wielkie	Kraków
18:00 CET (UTC+1)	Pychowski (penalty missed) 31'; Czulak 35'; Kisieliński 52' (pen.), 83' (pen.); H. Reyman 68'	Report	Peterek 26', (red card) 83'; Dziwisz 82'	Stadium: Stadion Wisły; Attendance: 3,000; Referee: Edward Gulicz (Lwów)

6 July 1930 10	Legia Warsaw	3–2	Wisła Kraków	Warsaw
18:00 CET (UTC+1)	Nawrot 69'; Ziemian 79'; Ciszewski 84'	Report	Kisieliński 30', 42'	Stadium: Stadion Wojska Polskiego; Attendance: 5,000; Referee: Kazimierz Wardęszkiewicz (Łódź)

13 July 1930 11	Czarni Lwów	4–2	Wisła Kraków	Lwów
17:30 CET (UTC+1)	Drzymała 14'; Koch 35', 54'; J. Reyman 48'	Report	Kisieliński 55', 77'	Stadium: Stadion Czarnych; Attendance: 2,000; Referee: Jan Stronczek (Katowice)

3 August 1930 12	Ruch Hajduki Wielkie	0–4	Wisła Kraków	Katowice
		Report	Kisieliński 34', 36', 88'; Sołtysik 85'	Stadium: Stadion 1. FC; Attendance: 2,500; Referee: Adolf Słomczyński (Sosnowiec)

10 August 1930 13	Wisła Kraków	1–0	ŁKS Łódź	Kraków
17:00 CET (UTC+1)	Kisieliński 52'	Report		Stadium: Stadion Wisły; Attendance: 1,000; Referee: Franciszek Krukowski (Warsaw)

31 August 1930 14	Wisła Kraków	2–2	Polonia Warsaw	Kraków
16:30 CET (UTC+1)	Lubowiecki 8'; H. Reyman 20'	Report	Ogrodziński 33'; Pazurek 35', (penalty missed) 39'	Stadium: Stadion Wisły; Attendance: 4,000; Referee: Adam Nawrocki (Poznań)

7 September 1930 15	Wisła Kraków	1–6	Garbarnia Kraków	Kraków
16:30 CET (UTC+1)	Czulak 13'	Report	Bator 4', 67'; Pazurek 35', 52'; Konkiewicz (penalty missed) 45'; Smoczek 46'; Nagraba 65'	Stadium: Stadion Wisły; Attendance: 3,500; Referee: Zygmunt Hanke (Łódź)

14 September 1930 16	Wisła Kraków	1–0	Legia Warsaw	Kraków
16:00 CET (UTC+1)	Kisieliński 75'	Report		Stadium: Stadion Wisły; Attendance: 3,000; Referee: Stefan Bira (Łódź)

21 September 1930 17	ŁTS-G Łódź	1–4	Wisła Kraków	Łódź
	Herbstreit 1'	Report	H. Reyman 11', 56'; Balcer 58'; Adamek 62'	Stadium: Stadion ŁTS-G; Attendance: 1,500; Referee: Adam Nawrocki (Poznań)

6 October 1930 18	KS Cracovia	0–1	Wisła Kraków	Kraków
15:00 CET (UTC+1)		Report	Kisieliński 14'	Stadium: Stadion Cracovii; Attendance: 8,000; Referee: Edward Gulicz (Lwów)

12 October 1930 19	KS Warszawianka	1–5	Wisła Kraków	Warsaw
	Jung 11'	Report	Kisieliński 15'; Fert 19' (o.g.); Czulak 31'; Balcer 64'; H. Reyman 90'	Stadium: Stadion Polonii; Attendance: 2,000; Referee: Edward Gulicz (Lwów)

19 October 1930 20	Wisła Kraków	5–5	Czarni Lwów	Kraków
14:45 CET (UTC+1)	Kisieliński 10'; H. Reyman 16' (pen.), 46', 85'; Czulak 50'	Report	Drzymała 1', 38'; Sawka 12'; Koch 75', 86'	Stadium: Stadion Wisły; Attendance: 3,000; Referee: Kazimierz Wardęszkiewicz (Łódź)

2 November 1930 21	Warta Poznań	0–1	Wisła Kraków	Poznań
		Report	Kisieliński 70'	Stadium: Stadion Miejski; Attendance: 8,000; Referee: Kazimierz Wardęszkiewicz (Łódź)

30 November 1930 22	Wisła Kraków	3–0	Pogoń Lwów	Kraków
11:30 CET (UTC+1)	Czulak 50'; Kisieliński 56'; H. Reyman 70'	Report		Stadium: Stadion Wisły; Attendance: 4,000; Referee: Jan Stronczek (Świętochłowice)

== Squad, appearances and goals ==
No.	Pos	Nat	Player	Total		I Liga	
No.	Pos	Nat	Player	Apps	Goals	Apps	Goals
	GK	(Poland) POL	Maksymilian Koźmin	21	0	21+0	0
	GK	(Poland) POL	Tadeusz Łukiewicz	2	0	1+1	0
	DF	(Poland) POL	Aleksander Pychowski	22	0	22+0	0
	DF	(Poland) POL	Emil Skrynkowicz	14	0	14+0	0
	MF	(Poland) POL	Karol Bajorek	12	0	12+0	0
	MF	(Poland) POL	Jan Kotlarczyk	22	0	22+0	0
	MF	(Poland) POL	Józef Kotlarczyk	21	1	21+0	1
	MF	(Poland) POL	Antoni Łyko	2	0	2+0	0
	MF	(Poland) POL	Bronisław Makowski	16	1	16+0	1
	MF	(Poland) POL	Ferdynand Pachner	4	0	4+0	0
	FW	(Poland) POL	Józef Adamek	15	2	15+0	2
	FW	(Poland) POL	Mieczysław Balcer	16	3	16+0	3
	FW	(Poland) POL	Stanisław Czulak	19	8	19+0	8
	FW	(Poland) POL	Jan Ketz	1	1	1+0	1
	FW	(Poland) POL	Walerian Kisieliński	18	17	18+0	17
	FW	(Poland) POL	Władysław Kowalski	1	1	1+0	1
	FW	(Poland) POL	Stefan Lubowiecki	9	5	9+0	5
	FW	(Poland) POL	Henryk Reyman	22	13	22+0	13
	FW	(Poland) POL	Kazimierz Sołtysik	3	1	3+0	1
	FW	(Poland) POL	Aleksander Stefaniuk	3	0	3+0	0

=== Goalscorers ===
Place	Position	Nation	Name	I Liga
1	FW	(Poland)	Walerian Kisieliński	17
2	FW	(Poland)	Henryk Reyman	13
3	FW	(Poland)	Stanisław Czulak	8
4	FW	(Poland)	Stefan Lubowiecki	5
5	FW	(Poland)	Mieczysław Balcer	3
6	FW	(Poland)	Józef Adamek	2
7	FW	(Poland)	Jan Ketz	1
7	FW	(Poland)	Władysław Kowalski	1
7	FW	(Poland)	Kazimierz Sołtysik	1
7	MF	(Poland)	Józef Kotlarczyk	1
7	MF	(Poland)	Bronisław Makowski	1
			Total	53
