= 1928 Wisła Kraków season =

Wisła Kraków
1928 season
- Chairman: Zygmunt Bieżeński
- Ekstraklasa: 1st
- Top goalscorer: Henryk Reyman (27 goals)

The 1928 season was Wisła Kraków's 20th year as a club.

== Friendlies ==
19 February 1928	Sparta Kraków (Poland)	1–15	(Poland) Wisła Kraków	Kraków, Poland
15:00 CET (UTC+1)		Report	H. Reyman; J. Reyman; Adamek; Balcer	Stadium: Stadion Olszy; Attendance: 500; Referee: Jakub Seidner (Kraków)

26 February 1928	Legja Kraków (Poland)	0–12	(Poland) Wisła Kraków	Kraków, Poland
15:00 CET (UTC+1)		Report	H. Reyman; J. Reyman; Żelazny; Czulak	Stadium: Stadion Olszy

4 March 1928	Pogoń Katowice (Poland)	3–1	(Poland) Wisła Kraków	Katowice, Poland
15:00 CET (UTC+1)	Grzegorczyk; Pazurek I	Report	H. Reyman	Attendance: 2,000; Referee: Jan Stronczek (Katowice)

8 April 1928	Wisła Kraków (Poland)	1–1	(Hungary) Vasas SC	Kraków, Poland
16:15 CET (UTC+1)	Nowosielski 77'	Report	Jeszmás 8'	Stadium: Stadion Wisły; Attendance: 2,000; Referee: Jakub Seidner (Kraków)

9 April 1928	Wisła Kraków (Poland)	1–2	(Hungary) Vasas SC	Kraków, Poland
16:15 CET (UTC+1)	H. Reyman 53'	Report	Jeszmás 16'; Szentmiklóssy 75'	Stadium: Stadion Wisły; Attendance: 2,000; Referee: Zdzisław Korngold (Kraków)

6 May 1928	SK Slavia Prague (Czechoslovakia)	5–0	(Poland) Wisła Kraków	Prague, Czechoslovakia
	Puč 12', 15', 27' (pen.); Suchy 42'; Seifert 44' (pen.)	Report

27 May 1928	Wisła Kraków (Poland)	2–4	(Hungary) Budai 33	Kraków, Poland
17:30 CET (UTC+1)	J. Krupa (pen.)	Report		Stadium: Stadion Wisły; Attendance: 300; Referee: Antoni Jedliński (Kraków)

28 May 1928	Wisła Kraków (Poland)	0–1	(Hungary) Budai 33	Kraków, Poland
17:30 CET (UTC+1)		Report	Czumpft 62'	Stadium: Stadion Wisły; Attendance: 2,000; Referee: Andrzej Rutkowski (Kraków)

7 June 1928	Victoria Sosnowiec (Poland)	1–6	(Poland) Wisła Kraków	Sosnowiec, Poland
		Report

29 June 1928	Czarni Lwów (Poland)	3–6	(Poland) Wisła Kraków	Lwów, Poland
17:30 CET (UTC+1)	Chmielowski; Nastula	Report	H. Reyman; Jan Kotlarczyk; J. Reyman	Stadium: Stadion Czarnych

1 July 1928	Pogoń Lwów (Poland)	4–7	(Poland) Wisła Kraków	Lwów, Poland
16:30 CET (UTC+1)	Maurer 3'; Garbień 25'; Prass 74'; Batsch 82'	Report	H. Reyman 28', 44', 50', 53', 78'; Jó. Kotlarczyk 30'; J. Krupa 80'	Referee: Stanisław Zawitkowski (Siedlce)

3 November 1928	Makkabi Kraków (Poland)	1–3	(Poland) Wisła Kraków	Kraków, Poland
14:30 CET (UTC+1)	Salinger (pen.)	Report	Jó. Kotlarczyk; W. Kowalski; Czulak	Stadium: Stadion Makkabi; Referee: Tadeusz Makary (Kraków)

25 November 1928	Klub Turystów Łódź (Poland)	0–4	(Poland) Wisła Kraków	Łódź, Poland
		Report	W. Kowalski; Czulak	Stadium: Stadion Klubu Turystów
Note: Match lasted 75 minutes.

== Ekstraklasa ==
18 March 1928 1	Wisła Kraków	4–0	Ruch Hajduki Wielkie	Kraków
15:15 CET (UTC+1)	Adamek 28', 50'; Czulak 63'; H. Reyman 80'	Report		Stadium: Stadion Wisły; Attendance: 2,000; Referee: Andrzej Przeworski (Warsaw)

25 March 1928 2	Klub Turystów Łódź	0–3	Wisła Kraków	Łódź
15:40 CET (UTC+1)		Report	H. Reyman 10', 35'; Balcer 56'	Stadium: Boisko WKS-u; Attendance: 2,000; Referee: Longin Dudryk-Darlewski (Lwów)

1 April 1928 3	Wisła Kraków	3–0	Czarni Lwów	Kraków
16:00 CET (UTC+1)	J. Reyman 37', 60'; H. Reyman 82'	Report		Stadium: Stadion Wisły; Attendance: 3,000; Referee: Alfons Raettig (Łódź)

15 April 1928 4	Toruński KS	2–7	Wisła Kraków	Toruń
15:30 CET (UTC+1)	J. Cieszyński 5'; J. Suchocki 22'	Report	J. Reyman 2', 60'; Adamek 17', 88'; Czulak 30'; H. Reyman 39', 42'	Stadium: Stadion TKS-u; Attendance: 1,500; Referee: Adam Nawrocki (Poznań)

22 April 1928 5	Wisła Kraków	3–2	Warta Poznań	Kraków
16:00 CET (UTC+1)	Balcer 25'; H. Reyman 28', 46'	Report	Radojewski 35'; Rochowicz 38'	Stadium: Stadion Wisły; Attendance: 5,000; Referee: Andrzej Przeworski (Warsaw)

3 May 1928 6	Legia Warsaw	1–0	Wisła Kraków	Warsaw
	Nawrot 14'	Report		Stadium: Stadion Wojska Polskiego; Attendance: 4,000; Referee: Rudolf Brzeziński (Poznań)

13 May 1928 7	KS Warszawianka	2–1	Wisła Kraków	Warsaw
	Jung 15', 52'	Report	J. Reyman 89'	Stadium: Boisko DOK-u; Attendance: 2,000; Referee: Zygmunt Rosenfeld (Bielsko)

17 May 1928 8	Wisła Kraków	7–2	Polonia Warsaw	Kraków
	H. Reyman 22', 72'; Jó. Kotlarczyk 42', 70'; J. Reyman 54'; Balcer 66', 74'	Report	Dittmer 14'; Krygier 88'	Stadium: Stadion Wisły; Attendance: 6,000; Referee: Alfons Raettig (Łódź)

20 May 1928 9	Wisła Kraków	3–2	1. FC Katowice	Kraków
17:00 CET (UTC+1)	Skrynkowicz 49' (pen.); H. Reyman 52'; Balcer 66'	Report	K. Kossok 29'; Joschke 64'	Stadium: Stadion Wisły; Attendance: 10,000; Referee: Józef Baran-Bilewski (Warsaw)

3 June 1928 10	KS Cracovia	2–1	Wisła Kraków	Kraków
17:30 CET (UTC+1)	Gintel 7', 31'	Report	H. Reyman 67' (pen.)	Stadium: Stadion Cracovii; Attendance: 10,000; Referee: Józef Baran-Bilewski (Warsaw)

24 June 1928 11	Wisła Kraków	6–1	Pogoń Lwów	Kraków
18:00 CET (UTC+1)	Jó. Kotlarczyk 18'; H. Reyman 25' (pen.), 41', 69'; J. Reyman 36', 42'	Report	Kuchar 90'	Stadium: Stadion Wisły; Attendance: 5,000; Referee: Zygmunt Rosenfeld (Bielsko)

8 July 1928 12	Wisła Kraków	2–4	ŁKS Łódź	Kraków
17:45 CET (UTC+1)	Skrynkowicz 84' (pen.); Czulak 88'	Report	Moskal; Śledź; Feja	Stadium: Stadion Wisły; Attendance: 2,500; Referee: Marian Bilor (Lwów)

15 July 1928 13	Śląsk Świętochłowice	1–2	Wisła Kraków	Świętochłowice
18:00 CET (UTC+1)	Markiefka	Report	Pytlik 15' (o.g.); Jó. Kotlarczyk 16'	Stadium: Boisko Stadionu; Attendance: 500; Referee: Andrzej Przeworski (Warsaw)

29 July 1928 14	Hasmonea Lwów	0–1	Wisła Kraków	Lwów
17:30 CET (UTC+1)		Report	J. Krupa 62'	Stadium: Stadion Hasmonei; Attendance: 3,000; Referee: Zygmunt Rosenfeld (Bielsko)

5 August 1928 15	Wisła Kraków	9–0	Toruński KS	Kraków
17:00 CET (UTC+1)	J. Krupa; H. Reyman; Jan Kotlarczyk (pen.); J. Reyman	Report		Stadium: Stadion Wisły; Attendance: 900; Referee: Janusz Mallow (Poznań)

15 August 1928 16	ŁKS Łódź	2–1	Wisła Kraków	Łódź
17:00 CET (UTC+1)	Król 19', 35'	Report	J. Krupa 51'; H. Reyman (penalty missed) 63'	Stadium: Stadion ŁKS-u; Attendance: 3,000; Referee: Longin Dudryk-Darlewski (Lwów)
Note: The fans stormed onto the field of play. Match abandoned after 63 minutes and completed on 25 November.

19 August 1928 17	Ruch Hajduki Wielkie	1–1	Wisła Kraków	Katowice
	Sobota	Report	Czulak 80'	Stadium: Stadion 1. FC; Attendance: 2,000; Referee: Stefan Bira (Łódź)

2 September 1928 18	Warta Poznań	2–0	Wisła Kraków	Poznań
16:30 CET (UTC+1)	Scherfke 22'; Staliński 34'	Report		Stadium: Stadion Warty; Attendance: 5,000; Referee: Artur Marczewski (Łódź)

9 September 1928 19	Wisła Kraków	5–1	KS Cracovia	Kraków
16:00 CET (UTC+1)	Czulak 11', 38'; Balcer 31', 51'; H. Reyman 82' (pen.)	Report	Gintel (penalty missed) ??'; Kałuża 52'	Stadium: Stadion Wisły; Attendance: 15,000; Referee: Artur Marczewski (Łódź)

16 September 1928 20	Czarni Lwów	2–3	Wisła Kraków	Lwów
16:00 CET (UTC+1)	Nastula 9', 49'	Report	J. Reyman 23'; W. Kowalski 61'; Balcer 69'	Stadium: Stadion Czarnych; Attendance: 4,000; Referee: Aleksander Kowalski (Lublin)

23 September 1928 21	Wisła Kraków	6–2	KS Warszawianka	Kraków
15:30 CET (UTC+1)	Czulak 6'; Balcer 14', 28', 85'; Nowosielski 15'; Jan Kotlarczyk 80' (pen.)	Report	Bibrych 32'; Korngold 38'	Stadium: Stadion Wisły; Attendance: 2,000; Referee: Rudolf Brzeziński (Poznań)

30 September 1928 22	Polonia Warsaw	2–7	Wisła Kraków	Warsaw
	Ratka 14'; Ałaszewski 41'	Report	Balcer 30'; H. Reyman 55', 82'; W. Kowalski 57', 63'; Makowski 65'; Czulak 75'	Stadium: Stadion Polonii; Attendance: 4,000; Referee: Artur Marczewski (Łódź)

7 October 1928 23	Wisła Kraków	4–1	Hasmonea Lwów	Kraków
15:00 CET (UTC+1)	Czulak 20'; W. Kowalski 26', 44'; J. Reyman 34'	Report	Steuermann 50'	Stadium: Stadion Wisły; Attendance: 3,000; Referee: Tadeusz Walczak (Warsaw)

14 October 1928 24	Wisła Kraków	2–1	Legia Warsaw	Kraków
15:00 CET (UTC+1)	Skrynkowicz 35' (pen.); Czulak 62'	Report	Wypijewski 90'	Stadium: Stadion Wisły; Attendance: 5,000; Referee: Artur Marczewski (Łódź)

21 October 1928 25	Pogoń Lwów	0–2	Wisła Kraków	Lwów
14:30 CET (UTC+1)		Report	W. Kowalski 46'; Czulak 60'	Stadium: Stadion Pogoni; Attendance: 4,000; Referee: Artur Marczewski (Łódź)

1 November 1928 26	Wisła Kraków	5–0	Klub Turystów Łódź	Kraków
14:15 CET (UTC+1)	H. Reyman 13', 24', 75'; Balcer 68'; Jan Kotlarczyk 87' (pen.)	Report		Stadium: Stadion Wisły; Attendance: 1,500; Referee: Franciszek Krukowski (Warsaw)

11 November 1928 27	Wisła Kraków	9–2	Śląsk Świętochłowice	Kraków
14:15 CET (UTC+1)	Balcer 2', 8', 49'; W. Kowalski 23', 76'; H. Reyman 45' (pen.), 58'; J. Reyman 65'; Czulak 87'	Report	Hanusik 1'; W. Kiecha 90'	Stadium: Stadion Wisły; Attendance: 1,000; Referee: Adolf Słomczyński (Sosnowiec)

18 November 1928 28	1. FC Katowice	1–1	Wisła Kraków	Katowice
14:30 CET (UTC+1)	Geisler 52'	Report	H. Reyman 13'	Stadium: Stadion 1. FC; Attendance: 5,000; Referee: Adam Nawrocki (Poznań)

== Squad, appearances and goals ==
No.	Pos	Nat	Player	Total		I Liga	
No.	Pos	Nat	Player	Apps	Goals	Apps	Goals
	GK	(Poland) POL	Emil Folga	4	0	4+0	0
	GK	(Poland) POL	Jan Ketz	7	0	7+0	0
	GK	(Poland) POL	Maksymilian Koźmin	16	0	16+0	0
	GK	(Poland) POL	Tadeusz Łukiewicz	1	0	1+0	0
	DF	(Poland) POL	Aleksander Pychowski	28	0	28+0	0
	DF	(Poland) POL	Emil Skrynkowicz	28	3	28+0	3
	MF	(Poland) POL	Karol Bajorek	24	0	24+0	0
	MF	(Poland) POL	Kazimierz Chorąży	1	0	1+0	0
	MF	(Poland) POL	Witold Gieras	2	0	2+0	0
	MF	(Poland) POL	Józef Kotlarczyk	18	4	18+0	4
	MF	(Poland) POL	Jan Kotlarczyk	28	3	28+0	3
	MF	(Poland) POL	Bronisław Makowski	20	1	20+0	1
	FW	(Poland) POL	Józef Adamek	9	4	9+0	4
	FW	(Poland) POL	Mieczysław Balcer	25	15	25+0	15
	FW	(Poland) POL	Stanisław Czulak	28	14	28+0	14
	FW	(Poland) POL	Władysław Kowalski	10	9	10+0	9
	FW	(Poland) POL	Józef Krupa	4	4	4+0	4
	FW	(Poland) POL	Karol Nowosielski	5	1	5+0	1
	FW	(Poland) POL	Henryk Reyman	24	27	24+0	27
	FW	(Poland) POL	Jan Reyman	16	12	16+0	12

=== Goalscorers ===
Place	Position	Nation	Name	I Liga
1	FW	(Poland)	Henryk Reyman	27
2	FW	(Poland)	Mieczysław Balcer	15
3	FW	(Poland)	Stanisław Czulak	14
4	FW	(Poland)	Jan Reyman	12
5	FW	(Poland)	Władysław Kowalski	7
6	FW	(Poland)	Józef Adamek	4
6	MF	(Poland)	Józef Kotlarczyk	4
6	FW	(Poland)	Józef Krupa	4
9	MF	(Poland)	Jan Kotlarczyk	3
9	DF	(Poland)	Emil Skrynkowicz	3
11	MF	(Poland)	Bronisław Makowski	1
11	FW	(Poland)	Karol Nowosielski	1
			Total	95
