= 1927 Wisła Kraków season =

Wisła Kraków
1927 season
- Chairman: Zygmunt Bieżeński
- Ekstraklasa: 1st
- Top goalscorer: Henryk Reyman (37 goals)

The 1927 season was Wisła Kraków's 19th year as a club.

== Friendlies ==
6 March 1927	Sparta Kraków (Poland)	0–12	(Poland) Wisła Kraków	Kraków, Poland
12:00 CEST (UTC+1)		Report		Stadium: Stadion Jutrzenki

13 March 1927	Zwierzyniecki KS (Poland)	7–1	(Poland) Wisła Kraków	Kraków, Poland
		Report		Attendance: 700

27 March 1927	Jutrzenka Kraków (Poland)	2–4	(Poland) Wisła Kraków	Kraków, Poland
		Report

28 March 1927	Krowodrza Kraków (Poland)	2–4	(Poland) Wisła Kraków	Kraków, Poland
15:30 CEST (UTC+1)	Szwabentan	Report	H. Reyman; Adamek	Stadium: Stadion Jutrzenki; Attendance: 1,800; Referee: Stanisław Ziemiański (Kraków)

26 July 1927	Wisła Kraków (Poland)	4–2	(Poland) Ruch Hajduki Wielkie	Kraków, Poland
17:30 CEST (UTC+1)	Balcer; J. Reyman; Wójcik	Report	Rebosione; Schneider	Stadium: Stadion Wisły; Attendance: 1,000; Referee: Adam Obrubański (Kraków)

15 August 1927	Warta Poznań (Poland)	1–7	(Poland) Wisła Kraków	Poznań, Poland
	Scherfke 24'	Report	Borkowski 18', 32', 55'; J. Reyman 44', 75'; Jan Kotlarczyk 50'; Adamek 85'	Stadium: Stadion Warty; Attendance: 2,000

August 1927	Wisła Kraków (Poland)	2–1	(Poland) BBSV Bielsko	Kraków, Poland
		Report

20 September 1927	Wisła Kraków (Poland)	6–1	(Romania) Fulgerul Bragadiru	Kraków, Poland
15:45 CEST (UTC+1)	H. Reyman; J. Reyman; Skóra	Report	Tenzer I	Stadium: Stadion Wisły; Attendance: 1,000

19 October 1927	Wisła Kraków (Poland)	11–0	(Poland) Makkabi Kraków	Kraków, Poland
15:00 CEST (UTC+1)	H. Reyman; Adamek; Czulak; Patzer (o.g.)	Report		Stadium: Stadion Wisły; Attendance: 1,000; Referee: Andrzej Rutkowski (Kraków)

30 October 1927	Wisła Kraków (Poland)	8–2	(Czechoslovakia) SK Moravská Slavia Brno	Kraków, Poland
14:45 CEST (UTC+1)	H. Reyman; Adamek; Czulak	Report	Foltyn; Hanus	Stadium: Stadion Wisły; Attendance: 1,500

1 November 1927	Wisła Kraków (Poland)	2–3	(Czechoslovakia) SK Moravská Slavia Brno	Kraków, Poland
14:30 CEST (UTC+1)	Adamek; W. Kowalski	Report	Belina; Boudek; Drtil	Stadium: Stadion Wisły

6 November 1927	Wisła Kraków (Poland)	7–0	(Poland) Reprezentacja Wyższych Uczelni	Kraków, Poland
14:45 CEST (UTC+1)	H. Reyman; Adamek; W. Kowalski; Czulak	Report		Stadium: Stadion Wisły

27 November 1927	Garbarnia Kraków (Poland)	3–3	(Poland) Wisła Kraków	Kraków, Poland
11:00 CEST (UTC+1)	Stefański; Konkiewicz	Report	J. Reyman 28', ??'; H. Reyman 40' (pen.)	Stadium: Stadion Garbarnii

4 December 1927	Wisła Kraków (Poland)	5–0	(Poland) Garbarnia Kraków	Kraków, Poland
11:30 CEST (UTC+1)	Adamek; H. Reyman; J. Reyman	Report		Stadium: Stadion Wisły; Referee: Jakub Seidner (Kraków)

== Ekstraklasa ==
3 April 1927 1	Jutrzenka Kraków	0–4	Wisła Kraków	Kraków
15:45 CEST (UTC+1)		Report	Czulak 21'; Adamek ??', ??' (pen.); H. Reyman ??'	Stadium: Stadion Jutrzenki; Attendance: 1,200; Referee: Bronisław Danziger (Łódź)

10 April 1927 2	Wisła Kraków	2–0	Ruch Hajduki Wielkie	Kraków
16:00 CEST (UTC+1)	H. Reyman 7'; Balcer 80'	Report		Stadium: Stadion Jutrzenki; Attendance: 2,000; Referee: Emil Niedźwirski (Lwów)

17 April 1927 3	Klub Turystów Łódź	5–1	Wisła Kraków	Łódź
	Bersch 24', 53', 60', 87'; A. Kubik 88'	Report	Balcer 10'	Stadium: Stadion Klubu Turystów; Attendance: 3,500; Referee: Rudolf Brzeziński (Poznań)

18 April 1927 4	Legia Warsaw	1–4	Wisła Kraków	Warsaw
	Łańko 20'	Report	Czulak 18'; Adamek 28', 38'; Stan. Wójcik 68'	Stadium: Agrykola; Attendance: 2,000; Referee: Zygmunt Hanke (Łódź)

24 April 1927 5	Wisła Kraków	3–1	Hasmonea Lwów	Kraków
16:00 CEST (UTC+1)	Adamek 18' (pen.), 55' (pen.); Balcer 73'	Report	Steuermann 10'	Stadium: Stadion Jutrzenki; Attendance: 3,000; Referee: Aleksander Kowalski (Lublin)

3 May 1927 6	Polonia Warsaw	2–1	Wisła Kraków	Warsaw
	Grabowski 73'; Ałaszewski 86'	Report	H. Reyman 55'	Stadium: Agrykola; Attendance: 5,000; Referee: Emil Niedźwirski (Lwów)

8 May 1927 7	Wisła Kraków	4–0	Czarni Lwów	Kraków
16:30 CEST (UTC+1)	H. Reyman 21'; J. Reyman 48'; Adamek 76'; Czulak 78'	Report		Stadium: Stadion Wisły; Attendance: 5,000; Referee: Bronisław Danziger (Łódź)

15 May 1927 8	ŁKS Łódź	0–0	Wisła Kraków	Łódź
		Report		Stadium: Stadion ŁKS-u; Attendance: 3,000; Referee: Andrzej Przeworski (Warsaw)

22 May 1927 9	Wisła Kraków	4–1	Warta Poznań	Kraków
17:00 CEST (UTC+1)	Czulak 15', 16', 83'; H. Reyman 39'	Report	Staliński 47'	Stadium: Stadion Wisły; Attendance: 1,000; Referee: Zygmunt Hanke (Łódź)

29 May 1927 10	Wisła Kraków	3–0	1. FC Katowice	Kraków
17:15 CEST (UTC+1)	Adamek 34'; H. Reyman 67'; Balcer 86'	Report		Stadium: Stadion Wisły; Attendance: 5,000; Referee: Zygmunt Hanke (Łódź)

16 June 1927 11	KS Warszawianka	0–2	Wisła Kraków	Warsaw
17:30 CEST (UTC+1)		Report	H. Reyman 35', 39'	Stadium: Agrykola; Attendance: 3,000; Referee: Zygmunt Hanke (Łódź)

19 June 1927 12	Toruński KS	2–7	Wisła Kraków	Toruń
16:00 CEST (UTC+1)	Herbstreit 1'; Gumowski 53'	Report	H. Reyman; Jó. Kotlarczyk; Adamek; Balcer	Stadium: Stadion TKS-u; Attendance: 800; Referee: Emil Niedźwirski (Lwów)

26 June 1927 13	Pogoń Lwów	4–1	Wisła Kraków	Lwów
17:00 CEST (UTC+1)	Kuchar 4', 53'; Garbień 49', 62'	Report	J. Reyman 18'	Stadium: Stadion Pogoni; Attendance: 7,000; Referee: Bronisław Danziger (Łódź)

24 July 1927 14	Czarni Lwów	2–3	Wisła Kraków	Lwów
17:00 CEST (UTC+1)	Harasymowicz 30', 58'	Report	Jó. Kotlarczyk 8', 37'; H. Reyman 75'	Stadium: Stadion Czarnych; Attendance: 2,000; Referee: Stanisław Piotrowski (Łódź)

31 July 1927 15	Wisła Kraków	8–2	KS Warszawianka	Kraków
17:15 CEST (UTC+1)	H. Reyman 17', 37', 47', 56', 58'; Adamek 28' (pen.); Jó. Kotlarczyk 36', 62'	Report	Jung 53', 77'	Stadium: Stadion Wisły; Attendance: 1,500; Referee: Zygmunt Rosenfeld (Bielsko)

7 August 1927 16	Wisła Kraków	7–2	Jutrzenka Kraków	Kraków
17:15 CEST (UTC+1)	Adamek 4'; H. Reyman 21', 72', 83'; J. Reyman 48', 49'; Balcer 90'	Report	Weinberg 52'; Krumholz 53'	Stadium: Stadion Wisły; Attendance: 2,000; Referee: Emil Niedźwirski (Lwów)

14 August 1927 17	Warta Poznań	3–2	Wisła Kraków	Poznań
17:00 CEST (UTC+1)	Przybysz 5'; Scherfke 23', 25'	Report	Bajorek 33'; Balcer 50'	Stadium: Stadion Warty; Attendance: 3,000; Referee: Zygmunt Hanke (Łódź)

21 August 1927 18	Wisła Kraków	1–0	Legia Warsaw	Kraków
16:30 CEST (UTC+1)	H. Reyman 23'	Report		Stadium: Stadion Wisły; Attendance: 3,000; Referee: Emil Niedźwirski (Lwów)

28 August 1927 19	Ruch Hajduki Wielkie	0–4	Wisła Kraków	Katowice
		Report	H. Reyman 5', 28'; Adamek 37' (pen.); Balcer 53'	Stadium: Stadion 1. FC; Attendance: 5,000; Referee: Zygmunt Hanke (Łódź)

4 September 1927 20	Wisła Kraków	3–1	ŁKS Łódź	Kraków
16:00 CEST (UTC+1)	H. Reyman 18' (pen.); Adamek 56' (pen.); Czulak 88'	Report	Lange 66' (pen.); Jasiński (red card) ??'	Stadium: Stadion Wisły; Attendance: 4,000; Referee: Andrzej Przeworski (Warsaw)

11 September 1927 21	Wisła Kraków	15–0	Toruński KS	Kraków
16:00 CEST (UTC+1)	H. Reyman; Adamek; J. Reyman; Balcer; Czulak	Report		Stadium: Stadion Wisły; Attendance: 1,500; Referee: Emil Niedźwirski (Lwów)

18 September 1927 22	Wisła Kraków	5–1	Klub Turystów Łódź	Kraków
15:30 CEST (UTC+1)	Czulak 4', 20', 62'; H. Reyman 68'; Balcer 83'	Report	Bałczewski 73'	Stadium: Stadion Wisły; Attendance: 2,000; Referee: Longin Dudryk-Darlewski (Lwów)

25 September 1927 23	1. FC Katowice	0–2	Wisła Kraków	Katowice
16:00 CEST (UTC+1)		Report	Czulak 55'; H. Reyman 60'	Stadium: Stadion 1. FC; Attendance: 15,000; Referee: Zygmunt Hanke (Łódź)

2 October 1927 24	Wisła Kraków	7–1	Polonia Warsaw	Kraków
15:00 CEST (UTC+1)	Balcer 16', 74'; Czulak 20'; H. Reyman 30', 52', 61' (pen.), 62'	Report	de Jelski 12' (pen.)	Stadium: Stadion Wisły; Attendance: 4,000; Referee: Emil Niedźwirski (Lwów)

9 October 1927 25	Wisła Kraków	0–2	Pogoń Lwów	Kraków
15:00 CEST (UTC+1)		Report	Kuchar 50'; Batsch 77'	Stadium: Stadion Wisły; Attendance: 6,000; Referee: Zygmunt Hanke (Łódź)

16 October 1927 26	Hasmonea Lwów	2–2	Wisła Kraków	Lwów
14:45 CEST (UTC+1)	Steuermann 31'; Parness 76'	Report	H. Reyman 12'; Czulak 85'	Stadium: Stadion Hasmonei; Attendance: 4,000; Referee: Andrzej Przeworski (Warsaw)

== Squad, appearances and goals ==
No.	Pos	Nat	Player	Total		I Liga	
No.	Pos	Nat	Player	Apps	Goals	Apps	Goals
	GK	(Poland) POL	Emil Folga	22	0	22+0	0
	GK	(Poland) POL	Maksymilian Koźmin	4	0	4+0	0
	GK	(Poland) POL	Tadeusz Łukiewicz	2	0	0+2	0
	DF	(Poland) POL	Emil Skrynkowicz	26	0	26+0	0
	DF	(Poland) POL	Aleksander Pychowski	10	0	10+0	0
	DF	(Poland) POL	Kazimierz Kaczor	4	0	4+0	0
	MF	(Poland) POL	Jan Kotlarczyk	26	0	26+0	0
	MF	(Poland) POL	Bronisław Makowski	18	0	18+0	0
	MF	(Poland) POL	Stefan Wójcik	14	0	14+0	0
	MF	(Poland) POL	Władysław Krupa	1	0	1+0	0
	FW	(Poland) POL	Józef Adamek	26	16	26+0	16
	FW	(Poland) POL	Jan Reyman	24	7	24+0	7
	FW	(Poland) POL	Henryk Reyman	23	37	23+0	37
	FW	(Poland) POL	Mieczysław Balcer	22	13	22+0	13
	FW	(Poland) POL	Stanisław Czulak	16	14	16+0	14
	FW	(Poland) POL	Józef Kotlarczyk	16	6	16+0	6
	FW	(Poland) POL	Karol Bajorek	13	1	13+0	1
	FW	(Poland) POL	Władysław Borkowski	13	0	13+0	0
	FW	(Poland) POL	Stanisław Wójcik	3	1	3+0	1
	FW	(Poland) POL	Karol Żelazny	3	0	3+0	0
	FW	(Poland) POL	Władysław Kowalski	2	0	2+0	0

=== Goalscorers ===
Place	Position	Nation	Name	I Liga
1	FW	(Poland)	Henryk Reyman	37
2	FW	(Poland)	Józef Adamek	16
3	FW	(Poland)	Stanisław Czulak	14
4	FW	(Poland)	Mieczysław Balcer	13
5	FW	(Poland)	Jan Reyman	7
6	FW	(Poland)	Józef Kotlarczyk	6
7	FW	(Poland)	Stanisław Wójcik	1
7	FW	(Poland)	Karol Bajorek	1
			Total	95
