= 1931 Wisła Kraków season =

Wisła Kraków
1931 season
- Chairman: Zygmunt Bieżeński
- Ekstraklasa: 2nd
- Top goalscorer: Walerian Kisieliński (24 goals)

The 1931 season was Wisła Kraków's 23rd year as a club.

== Friendlies ==
22 February 1931	Wisła Kraków (Poland)	12–1	(Poland) Korona Kraków	Kraków, Poland
11:30 CET (UTC+1)	Kisieliński; Czulak; Adamek; Woźniak	Report	Kochański	Stadium: Stadion Wisły; Attendance: 500

1 March 1931	Wisła Kraków (Poland)	11–1	(Poland) Podgórze Kraków	Kraków, Poland
11:30 CET (UTC+1)	Kisieliński; Czulak; Woźniak; Boligłowa	Report		Stadium: Stadion Wisły

8 March 1931	Wisła Kraków (Poland)	6–3	(Poland) Wawel Kraków	Kraków, Poland
11:30 CET (UTC+1)	Kisieliński; Woźniak	Report		Stadium: Stadion Wisły; Referee: Franciszek Babirecki (Kraków)

15 March 1931	Wisła Kraków (Poland)	2–2	(Poland) Legia Warsaw	Kraków, Poland
15:30 CET (UTC+1)	Kisieliński (pen.); H. Reyman	Report	Cebulak; Schaller	Stadium: Stadion Wisły; Attendance: 2,000; Referee: Tadeusz Makary (Kraków)
Note: The match lasted 2x30 minutes.

22 March 1931	Zwierzyniecki KS (Poland)	0–7	(Poland) Wisła Kraków	Kraków, Poland
11:30 CET (UTC+1)		Report	Kisieliński; H. Reyman; Czulak	Stadium: Boisko Sparty

7 April 1931	Wisła Kraków (Poland)	3–4	(Hungary) III. Kerületi FC	Kraków, Poland
16:15 CET (UTC+1)	Kisieliński 14', 30'; Balcer ??'	Report	? 29'; Lengyel 59'; Zihely 60', 76'	Stadium: Stadion Wisły; Attendance: 4,000; Referee: Franciszek Babirecki (Kraków)

8 April 1931	Makkabi Kraków (Poland)	1–6	(Poland) Wisła Kraków	Kraków, Poland
16:00 CET (UTC+1)		Report	Balcer; Kisieliński; Adamek; H. Reyman	Stadium: Stadion Makkabi

25 May 1931	Wisła Kraków (Poland)	3–4	(Poland) KS Cracovia	Kraków, Poland
17:30 CET (UTC+1)	Kisieliński 5'; Balcer 58', 78'	Report	Zieliński 10'; Maryan 21'; Selinger 42' (pen.); Poświat 72'	Stadium: Stadion Wisły; Attendance: 4,000; Referee: Julian Rumpler (Kraków)

29 June 1931	Hakoah Łódź (Poland)	0–5	(Poland) Wisła Kraków	Łódź, Poland
18:00 CET (UTC+1)		Report	H. Reyman; Balcer; Kisieliński	Stadium: Boisko WKS-u; Attendance: 1,000

9 August 1931	Reprezentacja Tarnowa (Poland)	0–5	(Poland) Wisła Kraków	Tarnów, Poland
		Report	Woźniak; H. Reyman; Kisieliński; Kotlarczyk

16 August 1931	06 Mysłowice (Poland)	1–5	(Poland) Wisła Kraków	Mysłowice, Poland
	Pieskowicz 42'	Report	H. Reyman 13', 86', (penalty missed) 46'; Adamek 54'; Kisieliński 58', 79'	Referee: Jan Stronczek (Świętochłowice)

23 August 1931	Wisła Kraków (Poland)	4–3	(Poland) Zwierzyniecki KS	Kraków, Poland
11:00 CET (UTC+1)	W. Kowalski; Sołtysik	Report	Dudek; Pamuła	Stadium: Stadion Wisły

21 September 1931	BBSV Bielsko (Poland)	3–3	(Poland) Wisła Kraków	Bielsko, Poland
	Wagner; Honigsmann	Report	Czulak; Kisieliński; Woźniak	Attendance: 1,000; Referee: Zygmunt Rosenfeld (Bielsko)

1 November 1931	AKS Królewska Huta (Poland)	2–6	(Poland) Wisła Kraków	Królewska Huta, Poland
	Duda; Gliwicki	Report	Kisieliński; Łyko; Woźniak	Stadium: Boisko AKS-u; Attendance: 1,000; Referee: Augustyn Gryc (Katowice)

16 November 1931	Wisła Kraków (Poland)	4–2	(Poland) KS Cracovia	Kraków, Poland
	Stefaniuk 18'; Kisieliński 57'; Jó. Kotlarczyk 66'; Lubowiecki 70'	Report	Mitusiński 12'; Kępiński 26'	Stadium: Stadion Wisły; Attendance: 1,000

27 December 1931	Naprzód Lipiny (Poland)	7–2	(Poland) Wisła Kraków	Świętochłowice, Poland
	Sternisko; Cug; Kaczmarczyk	Report	Kisieliński; Lubowiecki	Stadium: Boisko Naprzodu; Attendance: 3,000

== Ekstraklasa ==
29 March 1931 1	KS Warszawianka	2–5	Wisła Kraków	Warsaw
	S. Jung 24', 68'	Report	Kisieliński 54'; Adamek 60', 82'; Balcer 66', 88'	Stadium: Stadion Wojska Polskiego; Attendance: 1,000; Referee: Zygmunt Otto (Łódź)

12 April 1931 2	Wisła Kraków	4–1	Warta Poznań	Kraków
16:30 CET (UTC+1)	Lubowiecki 54'; Kisieliński 60', 66' (pen.), 85'	Report	Knioła 41'	Stadium: Stadion Wisły; Attendance: 4,000; Referee: Edward Gulicz (Lwów)

19 April 1931 3	Wisła Kraków	0–0	Garbarnia Kraków	Kraków
16:30 CET (UTC+1)		Report		Stadium: Stadion Wisły; Attendance: 5,000; Referee: Emil Niedźwirski (Lwów)

26 April 1931 4	Polonia Warsaw	1–3	Wisła Kraków	Warsaw
	Pazurek 29'	Report	Lubowiecki 3'; Balcer 17'; Kisieliński 84'	Stadium: Stadion Polonii; Attendance: 6,000; Referee: Edward Gulicz (Lwów)

3 May 1931 5	Pogoń Lwów	2–1	Wisła Kraków	Lwów
16:30 CET (UTC+1)	Zimmer 17'; Matyas 53'	Report	Kisieliński 56' (pen.)	Stadium: Stadion Pogoni; Attendance: 5,000; Referee: Adolf Słomczyński (Sosnowiec)

17 May 1931 6	KS Cracovia	1–4	Wisła Kraków	Kraków
17:00 CET (UTC+1)	Selinger 7' (pen.)	Report	Lubowiecki 5'; Kisieliński 50', (penalty missed) 87'; H. Reyman 52', 82'	Stadium: Stadion Cracovii; Attendance: 5,000; Referee: Edward Gulicz (Lwów)

24 May 1931 7	Wisła Kraków	5–1	Czarni Lwów	Kraków
17:00 CET (UTC+1)	Balcer 33', 36', 53'; Kisieliński 55' (pen.), 58'	Report	Koch 12'	Stadium: Stadion Wisły; Attendance: 2,000; Referee: Tadeusz Walczak (Warsaw)

31 May 1931 8	Wisła Kraków	1–2	Lechia Lwów	Kraków
17:30 CET (UTC+1)	H. Reyman 75'	Report	Kruk 71'; Rusiecki 88'	Stadium: Stadion Wisły; Attendance: 2,500; Referee: Franciszek Krukowski (Warsaw)

4 June 1931 9	Legia Warsaw	1–0	Wisła Kraków	Warsaw
	Nawrot 59'	Report		Stadium: Stadion Wojska Polskiego; Attendance: 6,000; Referee: Adam Nawrocki (Poznań)

21 June 1931 10	Wisła Kraków	6–2	Ruch Hajduki Wielkie	Kraków
18:00 CET (UTC+1)	Kisieliński 20', 71', 74'; H. Reyman 22'; Lubowiecki 24'; Balcer 27'	Report	Urban 44'; Peterek 69'	Stadium: Stadion Wisły; Attendance: 4,000; Referee: Kazimierz Wardęszkiewicz (Łódź)

28 June 1931 11	ŁKS Łódź	2–3	Wisła Kraków	Łódź
18:00 CET (UTC+1)	Tadeusiewicz 7'; Herbstreit 73'	Report	Kisieliński 18', 25'; Lubowiecki 49'	Stadium: Stadion ŁKS-u; Attendance: 4,500; Referee: Adam Nawrocki (Poznań)

27 July 1931 12	Wisła Kraków	4–1	ŁKS Łódź	Kraków
17:30 CET (UTC+1)	H. Reyman 2'; Kisieliński 14', 84'; Lubowiecki 76'	Report	Herbstreit 64'	Stadium: Stadion Wisły; Attendance: 3,000; Referee: Walenty Gerblich (Katowice)

2 August 1931 13	Wisła Kraków	2–2	Pogoń Lwów	Kraków
17:30 CET (UTC+1)	Balcer 18'; H. Reyman 61'	Report	Niechcioł 44'; Nahaczewski 57'; Hanin (red card) ??'	Stadium: Stadion Wisły; Attendance: 5,000; Referee: Adam Nawrocki (Poznań)

15 August 1931 14	Ruch Hajduki Wielkie	2–0	Wisła Kraków	Hajduki Wielkie
17:00 CET (UTC+1)	Sobotta 8'; Buchwald 15'	Report		Stadium: Boisko Ruchu; Attendance: 4,000; Referee: Borys Mazur (Sosnowiec)

31 August 1931 15	Wisła Kraków	3–0	Polonia Warsaw	Kraków
16:30 CET (UTC+1)	Woźniak 3'; Balcer 30'; Kisieliński 31'	Report		Stadium: Stadion Wisły; Attendance: 3,500; Referee: Kazimierz Wardęszkiewicz (Łódź)

6 September 1931 16	Wisła Kraków	1–2	KS Cracovia	Kraków
16:15 CET (UTC+1)	H. Reyman 51'	Report	Mitusiński 3'; Poświat 12'	Stadium: Stadion Wisły; Attendance: 5,000; Referee: Borys Mazur (Sosnowiec)

13 September 1931 17	Czarni Lwów	1–2	Wisła Kraków	Lwów
16:00 CET (UTC+1)	Łańko 70'	Report	Kisieliński 27'; Balcer 89'	Stadium: Stadion Czarnych; Attendance: 3,000; Referee: Edward Gulicz (Lwów)

27 September 1931 18	Lechia Lwów	2–0	Wisła Kraków	Lwów
15:00 CET (UTC+1)	Czudiak 27'; Małecki 85'	Report		Stadium: Boisko 40 PP; Attendance: 2,000; Referee: Jan Stronczek (Świętochłowice)

4 October 1931 19	Warta Poznań	1–2	Wisła Kraków	Poznań
	Scherfke 65'	Report	Woźniak 48'; Kisieliński 73'	Stadium: Stadion Warty; Attendance: 5,000; Referee: Jan Stronczek (Świętochłowice)

18 October 1931 20	Wisła Kraków	3–1	Legia Warsaw	Kraków
14:30 CET (UTC+1)	Lubowiecki 12'; Kisieliński 33', 84'	Report	Nawrot 56'	Stadium: Stadion Wisły; Attendance: 4,000; Referee: Adam Nawrocki (Poznań)

8 November 1931 21	Wisła Kraków	1–1	KS Warszawianka	Kraków
11:15 CET (UTC+1)	Kisieliński 15'	Report	Piliszek 48'	Stadium: Stadion Wisły; Attendance: 2,500; Referee: Rudolf Brzeziński (Poznań)

29 November 1931 22	Garbarnia Kraków	2–3	Wisła Kraków	Kraków
11:30 CET (UTC+1)	Maurer 27'; Konkiewicz 62' (pen.)	Report	Kisieliński 26', 32'; Stefaniuk 50'	Stadium: Stadion Garbarni; Attendance: 1,200; Referee: Kazimierz Wardęszkiewicz (Łódź)

== Squad, appearances and goals ==
No.	Pos	Nat	Player	Total		I Liga	
No.	Pos	Nat	Player	Apps	Goals	Apps	Goals
	GK	(Poland) POL	Marian Kiliński	1	0	0+1	0
	GK	(Poland) POL	Maksymilian Koźmin	21	0	21+0	0
	GK	(Poland) POL	Zbigniew Olewski	3	0	1+2	0
	DF	(Poland) POL	Eugeniusz Oleksik	4	0	4+0	0
	DF	(Poland) POL	Aleksander Pychowski	15	0	15+0	0
	DF	(Poland) POL	Emil Skrynkowicz	16	0	16+0	0
	MF	(Poland) POL	Karol Bajorek	15	0	15+0	0
	MF	(Poland) POL	Jan Kotlarczyk	22	0	22+0	0
	MF	(Poland) POL	Józef Kotlarczyk	22	0	22+0	0
	MF	(Poland) POL	Antoni Łyko	2	0	2+0	0
	MF	(Poland) POL	Bronisław Makowski	15	0	15+0	0
	MF	(Poland) POL	Ferdynand Pachner	1	0	1+0	0
	FW	(Poland) POL	Józef Adamek	13	2	13+0	2
	FW	(Poland) POL	Mieczysław Balcer	20	10	20+0	10
	FW	(Poland) POL	Stanisław Czulak	8	0	8+0	0
	FW	(Poland) POL	Walerian Kisieliński	22	24	22+0	24
	FW	(Poland) POL	Stefan Lubowiecki	16	7	16+0	7
	FW	(Poland) POL	Henryk Reyman	19	7	19+0	7
	FW	(Poland) POL	Aleksander Stefaniuk	4	1	4+0	1
	FW	(Poland) POL	Artur Woźniak	6	2	6+0	2

=== Goalscorers ===
Place	Position	Nation	Name	I Liga
1	FW	(Poland)	Walerian Kisieliński	24
2	FW	(Poland)	Mieczysław Balcer	10
3	FW	(Poland)	Henryk Reyman	7
3	FW	(Poland)	Stefan Lubowiecki	7
5	FW	(Poland)	Artur Woźniak	2
5	FW	(Poland)	Józef Adamek	2
7	FW	(Poland)	Aleksander Stefaniuk	1
			Total	53
