= 1932 Wisła Kraków season =

Wisła Kraków
1932 season
- Chairman: Zygmunt Bieżeński
- Ekstraklasa: 6th
- Top goalscorer: Artur Woźniak (13 goals)

The 1932 season was Wisła Kraków's 24th year as a club.

== Friendlies ==
27 February 1932	Strzelec Zakopane (Poland)	1–7	(Poland) Wisła Kraków	Zakopane, Poland
11:30 CET (UTC+1)		Report	Łyko; Lubowiecki; Woźniak; Czulak	Stadium: Stadion KIS-u; Referee: Józef Gauda (Kraków)

28 February 1932	KS Cracovia (Poland)	4–2	(Poland) Wisła Kraków	Zakopane, Poland
	Malczyk; Kubiński; Lasota (pen.)	Report	A. Stefaniuk; Jó. Kotlarczyk	Stadium: Stadion KIS-u; Referee: Józef Lustgarten (Kraków)

6 March 1932	Wisła Kraków (Poland)	7–3	(Poland) Zwierzyniecki KS	Kraków, Poland
11:30 CET (UTC+1)	Woźniak; Kisieliński (pen.); W. Stefaniuk; Adamek	Report	Dudek; Pamuła	Stadium: Stadion Wisły

14 March 1932	Wisła Kraków (Poland)	0–4	(Poland) Naprzód Lipiny	Kraków, Poland
11:30 CET (UTC+1)		Report	Kumor 48', ??'; Kania 55'; Cug 72'	Stadium: Stadion Wisły; Referee: Maksymilian Schneider (Kraków)

21 March 1932	Wisła Kraków (Poland)	6–0	(Poland) Krowodrza Kraków	Kraków, Poland
11:30 CET (UTC+1)	Lubowiecki 2'; Woźniak 3', 59'; Kisieliński 7', 70', 72'	Report		Stadium: Stadion Wisły; Referee: Józef Gauda (Kraków)

28 March 1932	Wisła Kraków (Poland)	1–2	(Czechoslovakia) 1. ČsŠK Bratislava	Kraków, Poland
16:00 CET (UTC+1)	Woźniak 15'	Report	Bulla 21'; Daučík 56'	Stadium: Stadion Wisły; Attendance: 2,000; Referee: Józef Lustgarten (Kraków)

3 April 1932	Korona Kraków (Poland)	1–3	(Poland) Wisła Kraków	Kraków, Poland
12:00 CET (UTC+1)	Białka	Report	Czulak; W. Stefaniuk; Jan Kotlarczyk (pen.)	Stadium: Boisko Korony; Attendance: 800; Referee: Jakub Seidner (Kraków)

9 April 1932	Wisła Kraków (Poland)	5–0	(Poland) Wawel Kraków	Kraków, Poland
11:00 CET (UTC+1)	Adamek; Kisieliński; Obtułowicz; Łyko	Report		Stadium: Stadion Wisły; Referee: Józef Lustgarten (Kraków)

3 May 1932	KS Cracovia (Poland)	0–3	(Poland) Wisła Kraków	Kraków, Poland
		Report	Łyko 59'; Kisieliński 69'; Nawara 82'	Stadium: Stadion Cracovii; Attendance: 10,000; Referee: Józef Gauda (Kraków)

14 July 1932	Wisła Kraków (Poland)	3–3	(Austria) SC Wacker Vienna	Kraków, Poland
17:45 CET (UTC+1)	Kisieliński 10'; J. Reyman 31'; Woźniak 83'	Report	Zischek 43'; Walzhofer 43'; Horvath 77'	Stadium: Stadion Cracovii; Attendance: 2,000; Referee: Maksymilian Gumplowicz (Kraków)

7 August 1932	Repr. Zagłębia Dąbrowskiego (Poland)	0–6	(Poland) Wisła Kraków	Sosnowiec, Poland
		Report	Kisieliński; Woźniak; Łyko; A. Stefaniuk	Stadium: Stadion Unii; Attendance: 3,000

21 August 1932	Wisła Kraków (Poland)	2–1	(Poland) Garbarnia Kraków	Kraków, Poland
17:00 CET (UTC+1)	Balcer; Łyko	Report	Pazurek	Stadium: Stadion Wisły; Attendance: 1,000; Referee: Władysław Neuwelt (Kraków)

30 October 1932	Reprezentacja Nowego Sącza (Poland)	2–8	(Poland) Wisła Kraków	Nowy Sącz, Poland
		Report	Woźniak; Adamek; Lubowiecki; Sołtysik	Attendance: 1,000

31 October 1932	Sandecja Nowy Sącz (Poland)	2–2	(Poland) Wisła Kraków	Nowy Sącz, Poland
		Report		Attendance: 1,000; Referee: Eugeniusz Kochanek (Kraków)

8 December 1932	Wisła Kraków (Poland)	4–1	(Poland) Wawel Kraków	Kraków, Poland
	Kisieliński; Adamek	Report		Stadium: Stadion Wisły

18 December 1932	Wisła Kraków (Poland)	2–0	(Poland) Zwierzyniecki KS	Kraków, Poland
	Lubowiecki; Kisieliński	Report		Stadium: Stadion Wisły

== Ekstraklasa ==
17 April 1932 1	Wisła Kraków	0–1	Legia Warsaw	Kraków
16:00 CET (UTC+1)		Report	Nawrot 60'	Stadium: Stadion Wisły; Attendance: 3,000; Referee: Oskar Kurzweil (Lwów)

24 April 1932 2	ŁKS Łódź	2–0	Wisła Kraków	Łódź
16:30 CET (UTC+1)	Sowiak 52'; Herbstreit 57' (pen.)	Report		Stadium: Stadion ŁKS-u; Attendance: 4,000; Referee: Emanuel Drosdz (Katowice)

8 May 1932 3	Pogoń Lwów	1–0	Wisła Kraków	Lwów
17:00 CET (UTC+1)	Matyas 29'	Report		Stadium: Stadion Pogoni; Attendance: 2,000; Referee: Józef Błahut (Lwów)

16 May 1932 4	Wisła Kraków	1–0 (3–0 w.o.)	Czarni Lwów	Kraków
17:00 CET (UTC+1)	Balcer 77'	Report		Stadium: Stadion Wisły; Attendance: 1,000; Referee: Adam Nawrocki (Poznań)

22 May 1932 5	Warta Poznań	8–3	Wisła Kraków	Poznań
	Kryszkiewicz 10', 40'; Knioła 16', 62'; F. Scherfke 32'; Nowacki 33'; Nowicki 47'; Różycki 76'	Report	Woźniak 60', 88'; H. Reyman 63'	Stadium: Stadion Warty; Attendance: 2,000; Referee: Kazimierz Wardęszkiewicz (Łódź)

26 May 1932 6	Wisła Kraków	5–2	22 PP Siedlce	Kraków
17:00 CET (UTC+1)	H. Reyman 28'; Kisieliński 36', 74'; Woźniak 65'; A. Stefaniuk 85'	Report	Bilewicz 28', 79'	Stadium: Stadion Wisły; Attendance: 2,500; Referee: Franciszek Krukowski (Warsaw)

12 June 1932 7	Wisła Kraków	2–2	KS Cracovia	Kraków
17:30 CET (UTC+1)	Balcer 20'; Woźniak 81'	Report	Ciszewski 10', 11'	Stadium: Stadion Wisły; Attendance: 6,000; Referee: Zygmunt Rosenfeld (Bielsko)

19 June 1932 8	Garbarnia Kraków	1–2	Wisła Kraków	Kraków
18:00 CET (UTC+1)	Maurer 7'	Report	J. Reyman 38'; Woźniak 89'	Stadium: Stadion Garbarni; Attendance: 4,000; Referee: Kazimierz Wardęszkiewicz (Łódź)

29 June 1932 9	Polonia Warsaw	0–1	Wisła Kraków	Warsaw
		Report	H. Reyman 38'	Stadium: Stadion Polonii; Attendance: 3,500; Referee: Józef Blahut (Bielsko)

17 July 1932 10	Wisła Kraków	1–1	Ruch Hajduki Wielkie	Kraków
17:45 CET (UTC+1)	H. Reyman 54' (pen.)	Report	Gwosdz 78'	Stadium: Stadion Wisły; Attendance: 3,000; Referee: Franciszek Obst (Poznań)

24 July 1932 11	KS Warszawianka	0–6	Wisła Kraków	Warsaw
		Report	H. Reyman 31'; Woźniak 42', 58', 85'; J. Reyman 50', 53'	Stadium: Stadion Wojska Polskiego; Attendance: 1,500; Referee: Władysław Szyba (Lwów)

15 August 1932 12	Wisła Kraków	2–1	ŁKS Łódź	Kraków
17:00 CET (UTC+1)	Balcer 5'; Woźniak 78'	Report	Durka 43'	Stadium: Stadion Wisły; Attendance: 2,000; Referee: Roman Berwald (Kraków)

4 September 1932 13	KS Cracovia	3–0	Wisła Kraków	Kraków
16:30 CET (UTC+1)	Malczyk 13', 52'; Zieliński 63'	Report		Stadium: Stadion Cracovii; Attendance: 5,000; Referee: Kazimierz Wardęszkiewicz (Łódź)

11 September 1932 14	Legia Warsaw	2–3	Wisła Kraków	Warsaw
	Nawrot 30', 59'	Report	Czulak 17'; Woźniak 25', 76'	Stadium: Stadion Wojska Polskiego; Attendance: 3,000; Referee: Artur Marczewski (Łódź)

18 September 1932 15	Ruch Hajduki Wielkie	5–0	Wisła Kraków	Hajduki Wielkie
	Gwosdz 27', 54', 60'; Peterek 62', 64'	Report		Stadium: Boisko Ruchu; Attendance: 4,000; Referee: Karol Wieczysty (Lwów)

25 September 1932 16	Wisła Kraków	0–3	Warta Poznań	Kraków
15:45 CET (UTC+1)		Report	Kryszkiewicz 3'; Radojewski 34'; Nowacki 73'	Stadium: Stadion Wisły; Attendance: 3,000; Referee: Alfons Raettig (Łódź)

9 October 1932 17	Wisła Kraków	2–2	Garbarnia Kraków	Kraków
11:00 CET (UTC+1)	Kisieliński 20' (pen.), 48'	Report	Smoczek 10'; Maurer 44'	Stadium: Stadion Wisły; Attendance: 4,000; Referee: Stanisław Kuniczak (Lwów)

16 October 1932 18	Czarni Lwów	2–2	Wisła Kraków	Lwów
	Chmielowski 27' (pen.); Żurkowski 64'	Report	Woźniak 24'; Kisieliński 69'; Adamek (red card) 87'	Attendance: 1,500; Referee: Emanuel Drosdz (Katowice)

23 October 1932 19	22 PP Siedlce	3–0	Wisła Kraków	Siedlce
	Sroczyński 1'; Sadalski 23'; Gwoździński 88'	Report		Stadium: Stadion 22 PP; Attendance: 3,000; Referee: Edward Gulicz (Lwów)

6 November 1932 20	Wisła Kraków	2–1	Pogoń Lwów	Kraków
14:00 CET (UTC+1)	Adamek 33'; H. Reyman 90'	Report	Zimmer 7'	Stadium: Stadion Wisły; Attendance: 2,500; Referee: Tadeusz Walczak (Warsaw)

14 November 1932 21	Wisła Kraków	1–2	KS Warszawianka	Kraków
12:00 CET (UTC+1)	Woźniak 15'	Report	Królewicki 8', 62'	Stadium: Stadion Wisły; Attendance: 2,000; Referee: Szczepan Kreicarek (Przemyśl)

27 November 1932 22	Wisła Kraków	2–0	Polonia Warsaw	Kraków
12:00 CET (UTC+1)	Balcer 5'; H. Reyman 60'	Report		Stadium: Stadion Wisły; Attendance: 2,500; Referee: Kazimierz Wardęszkiewicz (Łódź)

== Squad, appearances and goals ==
No.	Pos	Nat	Player	Total		I Liga	
No.	Pos	Nat	Player	Apps	Goals	Apps	Goals
	GK	(Poland) POL	Maksymilian Koźmin	14	0	14+0	0
	GK	(Poland) POL	Zbigniew Olewski	1	0	0+1	0
	GK	(Poland) POL	Marian Seyrlhuber	9	0	8+1	0
	DF	(Poland) POL	Józef Kotlarczyk	20	0	20+0	0
	DF	(Poland) POL	Eugeniusz Oleksik	12	0	12+0	0
	DF	(Poland) POL	Aleksander Pychowski	1	0	1+0	0
	DF	(Poland) POL	Stanisław Szczepanik	4	0	4+0	0
	DF	(Poland) POL	Władysław Szumilas	8	0	8+0	0
	MF	(Poland) POL	Karol Bajorek	22	0	22+0	0
	MF	(Poland) POL	Mieczysław Jezierski	22	0	22+0	0
	MF	(Poland) POL	Jan Kotlarczyk	21	0	21+0	0
	MF	(Poland) POL	Antoni Łyko	3	0	3+0	0
	FW	(Poland) POL	Józef Adamek	7	1	7+0	1
	FW	(Poland) POL	Mieczysław Balcer	16	4	16+0	4
	FW	(Poland) POL	Stanisław Czulak	5	1	5+0	1
	FW	(Poland) POL	Walerian Kisieliński	13	5	13+0	5
	FW	(Poland) POL	Stefan Lubowiecki	2	0	2+0	0
	FW	(Poland) POL	Jan Nawara	6	0	6+0	0
	FW	(Poland) POL	Stanisław Obtułowicz	2	0	2+0	0
	FW	(Poland) POL	Henryk Reyman	17	7	17+0	7
	FW	(Poland) POL	Jan Reyman	9	3	9+0	3
	FW	(Poland) POL	Aleksander Stefaniuk	10	1	10+0	1
	FW	(Poland) POL	Władysław Stefaniuk	1	0	1+0	0
	FW	(Poland) POL	Artur Woźniak	19	13	19+0	13

=== Goalscorers ===
Place	Position	Nation	Name	I Liga
1	FW	(Poland)	Artur Woźniak	13
2	FW	(Poland)	Henryk Reyman	7
3	FW	(Poland)	Walerian Kisieliński	5
4	FW	(Poland)	Mieczysław Balcer	4
5	FW	(Poland)	Jan Reyman	3
6	FW	(Poland)	Józef Adamek	1
6	FW	(Poland)	Stanisław Czulak	1
6	FW	(Poland)	Aleksander Stefaniuk	1
			Total	35

=== Disciplinary record ===
Name	Nation	Position	Ekstraklasa	Total
Name	Nation	Position	Sent off (straight red)	Sent off (straight red)
Józef Adamek	(Poland)	FW	1	1
