= Kotlarczyk =

Kotlarczyk is a Polish-language surname a diminutive form of a nickname literally meaning the occupation of kotlar, tinker/tinsmith. Notable people with the surname include:

- Jan Kotlarczyk, Polish footballer
- Józef Kotlarczyk (1907–1959), Polish footballer
- Mieczysław Kotlarczyk (1908–1978), Polish actor
- Teresa Kotlarczyk (born 1955), Polish film director
