= Stanisław Wójcik =

Polish footballer

Personal information
- Date of birth: 2 May 1904
- Place of birth: Kraków, Austria-Hungary
- Date of death: 2 July 1981 (aged 77)
- Place of death: Kraków, Poland
- Height: 1.68 m (5 ft 6 in)
- Position: Forward

Senior career*
Years	Team	Apps	(Gls)
1919–1921	Orkan Dębniki		
1921–1924	Sparta Kraków		
1925–1927	Cracovia		
1927	Wisła Kraków		
1927–1931	Cracovia		

International career
1927	Poland	1	(1)
- * Club domestic league appearances and goals

Stanisław Wójcik (2 May 1904 – 2 July 1981) was a Polish footballer who played as a forward.

He made one appearance for the Poland national team, scoring once in a 3–0 win over Romania on 16 June 1927.

== Honours ==
Wisła Kraków

- Ekstraklasa: 1927
