= Zenon Sroczyński =

Polish footballer

Personal information
- Date of birth: 23 July 1909
- Place of birth: Poznań, Poland
- Date of death: 14 April 1984 (aged 74)
- Place of death: Poznań, Poland
- Height: 1.72 m (5 ft 8 in)
- Position: Midfielder

Senior career*
Years	Team	Apps	(Gls)
- Legia Poznań
1932–1933	WKS 22 pp Siedlce	42	(4)
1933–1939	Warszawianka	86	(0)

International career
1935	Poland	1	(0)
- * Club domestic league appearances and goals

Zenon Sroczyński (23 July 1909 – 14 April 1984) was a Polish footballer who played as a midfielder. He made one appearance for the Poland national team in a 3–3 draw against Latvia on 15 September 1935.
