= Symplicjusz Zwierzewski =

Polish footballer

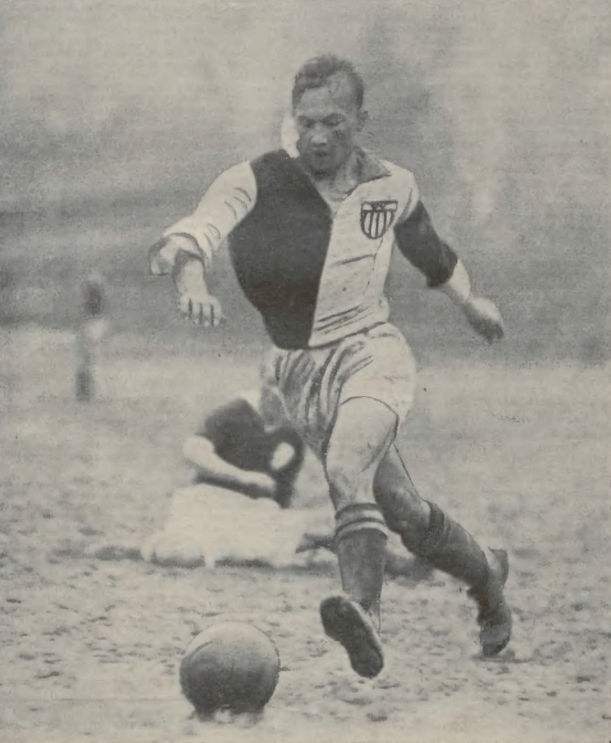
- Symplicjusz Zwierzewski

Personal information
- Date of birth: 6 December 1903
- Place of birth: Kraków, Austria-Hungary
- Date of death: 26 December 1986 (aged 83)
- Place of death: Gdynia, Poland
- Height: 1.85 m (6 ft 1 in)
- Position: Forward

Senior career*
Years	Team	Apps	(Gls)
–1921	Korona Warsaw		
1921–1936	Warszawianka		

International career
1926–1936	Poland	3	(0)
- * Club domestic league appearances and goals

Symplicjusz Zwierzewski (6 December 1903 – 26 December 1986) was a Polish footballer who played as a forward.

He earned three caps for the Poland national football team from 1926 to 1936.
