= Marian Schaller =

Polish footballer

Personal information
- Date of birth: 5 February 1904
- Place of birth: Kraków, Austria-Hungary
- Date of death: 8 May 1976 (aged 72)
- Place of death: Warsaw, Poland
- Height: 1.74 m (5 ft 9 in)
- Position: Midfielder

Senior career*
Years	Team	Apps	(Gls)
1920–1925	Urania Kraków		
1925–1926	Pogoń Wilno		
1927	Cresovia Grodno		
1927–1936	Legia Warsaw		

International career
1930–1934	Poland	4	(0)

Managerial career
- 1949: Legia Warsaw
- * Club domestic league appearances and goals

Marian Schaller (5 February 1904 – 8 May 1976) was a Polish footballer who played as a midfielder.

He played in four matches for the Poland national team from 1930 to 1934.
