= Józef Sobota =

Polish footballer

Personal information
- Date of birth: 14 March 1903
- Place of birth: Bismarckhütte, German Empire
- Date of death: 2 April 1979 (aged 76)
- Place of death: Chorzów, Poland
- Height: 1.56 m (5 ft 1 in)
- Position: Forward

Senior career*
Years	Team	Apps	(Gls)
- Bismarckhütter BC
1920–1932	Ruch Hajduki Wielkie		

International career
1926	Poland	1	(1)
- * Club domestic league appearances and goals

Józef Sobota (14 March 1903 – 2 April 1979) was a Polish footballer who played as a forward.

He earned one cap for Poland, scoring 13 minutes into his debut in a 2–0 win over Estonia on 4 July 1926. He was the first Ruch player to feature for the Poland national team.
