= Gustaw Bator =

Polish footballer

Personal information
- Date of birth: 17 April 1907
- Place of birth: Kraków, Austria-Hungary
- Date of death: 13 May 1955 (aged 48)
- Place of death: Kraków, Poland
- Position: Midfielder

Senior career*
Years	Team	Apps	(Gls)
- Nadwiślan Kraków
–1929	KS Grzegórzeczki		
1929–1934	Garbarnia Kraków		
1935–1937	Kotwica Pińsk		
1937–1939	KS Chełmek		
1940	Cracovia		
1940–1941	Wisła Kraków		
1945–1948	MKS Kraków		

International career
1931–1932	Poland	3	(1)
- * Club domestic league appearances and goals

Gustaw Bator (17 April 1907 – 13 May 1955) was a Polish footballer who played as a midfielder.

He made three appearances for the Poland national team from 1931 to 1932.

== Honours ==
Garbarnia Kraków

- Ekstraklasa: 1931
