= Juliusz Joksch =

Polish footballer

Personal information
- Full name: Juliusz Waldemar Joksch
- Date of birth: 21 January 1909
- Place of birth: Jaworzno, Austria-Hungary
- Date of death: 1978 (aged 68–69)
- Place of death: Bydgoszcz, Poland
- Height: 1.78 m (5 ft 10 in)
- Position: Defender

Senior career*
Years	Team	Apps	(Gls)
–1927	Szczakowianka Jaworzno		
1927–1929	Fablok Chrzanów		
1929–1935	Garbarnia Kraków		
1936–1939	KS Warszawianka		
1940–1944	DTSG Krakau		

International career
1936	Poland	1	(0)
- * Club domestic league appearances and goals

Juliusz Waldemar Joksch (21 January 1909 – 1978) was a Polish footballer who played as a defender.

He earned one cap for the Poland national team in 1936.
