= Union Touring Łódź =

Polish football club

Union Touring Łódź was a Polish football club from the city of Łódź. Union Touring was created in 1932 as the result of a merger of Klub Turystow Łódź and SS Union Łódź. In late 1938 the team was promoted to the Polish football League and appeared in the unfinished 1939 season.

Union Touring's promotion was the result of several games. Firstly, in regional tournament, Łódź's side scores were: with Zaglebie Dabrowa Gornicza 5-0 and 2–1, with Legia Warszawa 4-1 and 0-1 and with Unia Lublin 3-0 and 3–1. Then, next stage was a national qualifying tournament. There, in late 1938, Union Touring's results were: with Garbarnia Kraków 1-2 and 3–2, with Śląsk Świętochłowice 4-1 and 3-0 and with Policyjny KS Luck 2-0 and 3-3. This meant that in a 4-team group Łódź's team finished in second position (after Garbarnia) and won promotion to the Ekstraklasa.

Union Touring's lone, unfinished season was a total failure. Łódź's side won only one game (2–1 at home with Garbarnia Kraków), tied 2–2 with Pogoń Lwów in Lwów and lost the remaining 10 matches (including lopsided 1–12 game against Ruch Chorzów as well as defeats 1–7 to AKS Chorzów and 0–7 to Warta Poznań).

As of 31 August 1939 Union Touring was the last, 10th team in Polish football League, with only 3 points (goals difference 15–51). Even though the 1939 season never ended (see: Polish September Campaign) and the team played only 12 out of 18 planned games, most probably it would have been relegated to the A-Class.

World War II meant the end of Union Touring's existence.
