= Józef Ciszewski =

Polish footballer

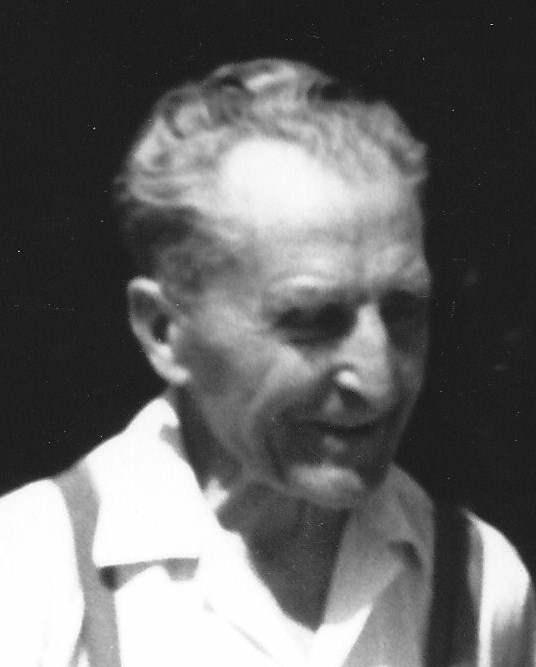

Personal information
- Date of birth: 12 January 1904
- Place of birth: Kraków, Austria-Hungary
- Date of death: 2 May 1987 (aged 83)
- Place of death: Warsaw, Poland
- Height: 1.69 m (5 ft 7 in)
- Position: Forward

Senior career*
Years	Team	Apps	(Gls)
1920–1925	Cracovia		
1926–1931	Legia Warsaw		
1932–1934	Cracovia		
1935–1939	Polonia Warsaw		
1941–1945	Błysk Warsaw		

International career
1925–1934	Poland	14	(3)
- * Club domestic league appearances and goals

Józef Ciszewski (12 January 1904 – 2 May 1987) was a Polish footballer who played as a forward. He made 14 appearances for the Poland national team, scoring three goals.

== Career ==
Ciszewski started career in Cracovia in 1920. Later moved to Warsaw, where he played for Legia, Polonia and Błysk, with an exception for a two-year stint at Cracovia in early 1930s, with whom he won the 1932 league title.

== Honours ==
Cracovia

- Ekstraklasa: 1932
