= Adolf Zimmer =

Polish footballer (1908–1940)

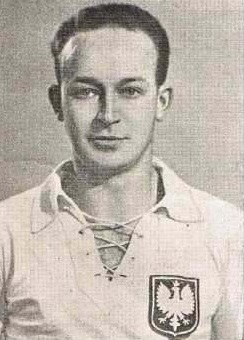

Personal information
- Date of birth: 28 February 1908
- Place of birth: Lwów, Austria-Hungary
- Date of death: 1940 (aged 31–32)
- Place of death: Kharkiv, Soviet Union
- Height: 1.67 m (5 ft 6 in)
- Position: Forward

Senior career*
Years	Team	Apps	(Gls)
–1939	Pogoń Lwów		

International career
1934	Poland	1	(0)
- * Club domestic league appearances and goals

Adolf Alfred Jan Zimmer (28 February 1908 – spring 1940) was a Polish footballer who played as a forward, victim of the Katyn massacre.

He made one appearance for the Poland national team in 1934. His club was Pogoń Lwów.

A lieutenant in the Polish Army, he was imprisoned by the NKVD following the Soviet invasion of Poland in 1939 and killed in the Katyn Massacre in May 1940, aged 32.

== Honours ==
Pogoń Lwów

- Polish Football Championship: 1922, 1923, 1925, 1926
