= Aleksander Szenajch =

Polish sprinter

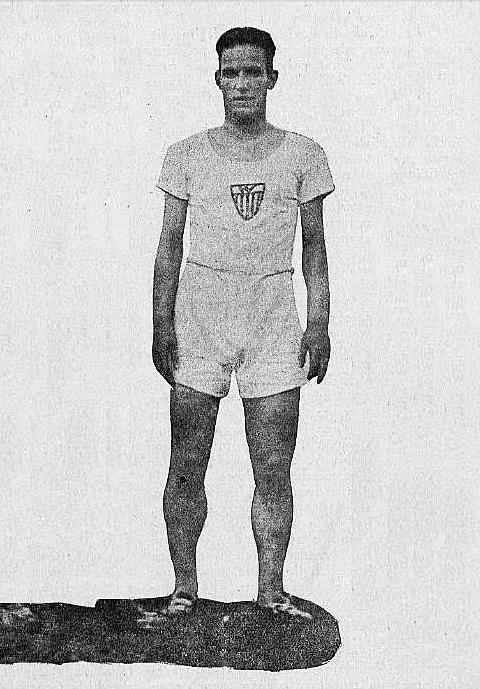
- Szenajch in 1923

Personal information
- Nationality: Polish
- Born: 26 August 1904 Warsaw, Russian Empire
- Died: 5 June 1987 (aged 82) Brussels, Belgium

Sport
- Sport: Track and field
- Events: 100m, 200m

Aleksander Szenajch (26 August 1904 – 5 June 1987) was a Polish sprinter. He competed in the men's 100 metres and the men's 200 metres events at the 1924 Summer Olympics.
