= Bronisław Makowski =

Polish footballer (1905–1944)

Personal information
- Full name: Bronisław Wincenty Makowski
- Date of birth: 25 May 1905
- Place of birth: Częstochowa, Poland
- Date of death: 25 May 1944 (aged 39)
- Place of death: Kraków, Poland
- Position: Midfielder

Youth career
- 1919–1925: Cracovia

Senior career*
Years	Team	Apps	(Gls)
1925–1926	Vilia Vilnius		
1926	Cracovia	1	(0)
1927–1931	Wisła Kraków	93	(2)
1932–1936	Warszawianka	54	(0)

International career
1931	Poland	1	(0)
- * Club domestic league appearances and goals

Bronisław Makowski (25 May 1905 – 25 May 1944) was a Polish footballer who played as a midfielder. He played in one match for the Poland national team in 1931. A resistance member during World War II, he was arrested and executed by the Gestapo on his 39th birthday.

== Honours ==
Wisła Kraków

- Ekstraklasa: 1927, 1928
