= Leon Radojewski =

Polish footballer

Personal information
- Date of birth: 29 January 1909
- Place of birth: Datteln, German Empire
- Date of death: 2 April 1984 (aged 75)
- Position: Forward

Senior career*
Years	Team	Apps	(Gls)
1923–1924	Unia Poznań		
1925–1935	Warta Poznań		

International career
1932	Poland	1	(1)
- * Club domestic league appearances and goals

Leon Radojewski (29 January 1909 – 2 April 1984) was a Polish footballer who played as a forward.

On 2 October 1932, in his sole appearance for the Poland national team, Radojewski scored the winning goal in a 2–1 win over Latvia.

== Honours ==
Warta Poznań

- Ekstraklasa: 1929
