= Władysław Przybysz =

Polish footballer (1900–1975)

Personal information
- Date of birth: 26 May 1900
- Place of birth: Inowrocław, German Empire
- Date of death: 31 December 1975 (aged 75)
- Place of death: Bydgoszcz, Poland
- Position: Forward

Senior career*
| Years | Team | Apps | (Gls) |
| 1919–1922 | KS Posnania | | |
| 1922–1930 | Warta Poznań | | |
| 1933 | Polonia Bydgoszcz | | |

International career
| 1928 | Poland | 1 | (0) |

Managerial career
- Polonia Bydgoszcz
- Ciszewski Bydgoszcz
- * Club domestic league appearances and goals

Władysław Przybysz (26 May 1900 – 31 December 1975) was a Polish footballer who played as a forward.

He made one appearance for the Poland national team in 1928.

== Honours ==
Warta Poznań

- Ekstraklasa: 1929
