= Karol Hanke =

Polish footballer (1903–1964)

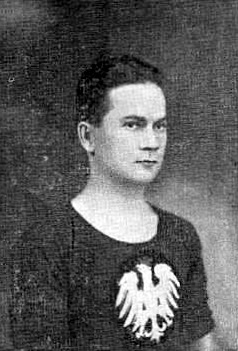

Personal information
- Full name: Karol Daniel Hanke
- Date of birth: 6 September 1903
- Place of birth: Łódź, Congress Poland
- Date of death: 15 April 1964 (aged 60)
- Place of death: Warsaw, Poland
- Height: 1.65 m (5 ft 5 in)
- Position: Midfielder

Senior career*
Years	Team	Apps	(Gls)
1920–1924	ŁKS Łódź		
1924–1931	Pogoń Lwów		

International career
1924–1928	Poland	9	(0)

Managerial career
- 1936: Legia Warsaw
- * Club domestic league appearances and goals

Karol Daniel Hanke (6 September 1903 – 15 April 1964) was a Polish footballer who played as a midfielder for ŁKS Łódź and Pogoń Lwów.

He debuted for the Poland national team on 29 June 1924 in a 2–0 win over Turkey, while capping his final match on 1 July 1928 against Sweden in a 2–1 win. He earned 9 caps for Poland, scoring 0 goals.

== Honours ==
Pogoń Lwów

- Ekstraklasa: 1925, 1926
