= Antoni Śledź =

Polish footballer

Personal information
- Date of birth: 2 February 1901
- Place of birth: Łódź, Russian Empire
- Date of death: 29 April 1979 (aged 78)
- Place of death: Rawa Mazowiecka, Poland
- Height: 1.64 m (5 ft 5 in)
- Position: Forward

Senior career*
Years	Team	Apps	(Gls)
- Sokół Łódź
- WKS Łódź
1921–1930	ŁKS Łódź		

International career
1924	Poland	1	(0)
- * Club domestic league appearances and goals

Antoni Śledź (2 February 1901 – 29 April 1979) was a Polish footballer who played as a forward.

He made one appearance for the Poland national team in 1924.
