= Emil Skrynkowicz =

Polish footballer

Personal information
- Date of birth: 3 May 1907
- Place of birth: Kraków, Poland
- Date of death: 26 October 1931 (aged 24)
- Place of death: Kraków, Poland
- Height: 1.86 m (6 ft 1 in)
- Position: Defender

Youth career
- Polonia Kraków
- 1923–1926: Wisła Kraków

Senior career*
Years	Team	Apps	(Gls)
1926–1931	Wisła Kraków	104	(3)

International career
1931	Poland	1	(0)
- * Club domestic league appearances and goals

Emil Skrynkowicz (3 May 1907 – 26 October 1931) was a Polish footballer who played as a defender. He played in one match for the Poland national team in 1931.

== Honours ==
Wisła Kraków

- Ekstraklasa: 1927, 1928
