= Tadeusz Konkiewicz =

Polish footballer

Personal information
- Date of birth: 28 August 1906
- Place of birth: Kraków, Austria-Hungary
- Date of death: 24 May 1956 (aged 49)
- Place of death: Kraków, Poland
- Position: Defender

Senior career*
Years	Team	Apps	(Gls)
1918–1921	Sparta Kraków		
1921–1925	Wisła Kraków		
1926–1934	Garbarnia Kraków		

International career
1930	Poland	1	(0)
- * Club domestic league appearances and goals

Tadeusz Konkiewicz (28 August 1906 – 24 May 1956) was a Polish footballer who played as a defender.

He made one appearance for the Poland national team in 1930.

== Honours ==
Garbarnia Kraków

- Ekstraklasa: 1931
