= Stanisław Czulak =

Polish footballer

Personal information
- Date of birth: 7 January 1900
- Place of birth: Kraków, Austria-Hungary
- Date of death: 2 November 1974 (aged 74)
- Place of death: Kraków, Poland
- Height: 1.68 m (5 ft 6 in)
- Position: Forward

Senior career*
Years	Team	Apps	(Gls)
1919–1922	Sparta Kraków		
1922	Garbarnia Kraków		
1923–1933	Wisła Kraków		

International career
1924	Poland	1	(1)
- * Club domestic league appearances and goals

Stanisław Czulak (7 January 1900 – 2 November 1974) was a Polish footballer who played as a forward.

He made one appearance for the Poland national team in 1924.

== Honours ==
Wisła Kraków

- Ekstraklasa: 1927, 1928
- Polish Cup: 1925–26
