= Aleksander Pychowski =

Polish footballer (1903–1943)

Personal information
- Date of birth: 3 November 1903
- Place of birth: Kraków, Austria-Hungary
- Date of death: 20 October 1943 (aged 39)
- Place of death: Kraków, Poland
- Height: 1.66 m (5 ft 5 in)
- Position: Defender

Senior career*
Years	Team	Apps	(Gls)
–1922	Polonia Kraków		
1922–1925	Cracovia		
1925–1935	Wisła Kraków		

International career
1925–1926	Poland	3	(0)
- * Club domestic league appearances and goals

Aleksander Pychowski (3 November 1903 – 20 October 1943) was a Polish footballer who played as a defender.

== Football career ==
He played in three matches for the Poland national football team from 1925 to 1926.

He played for Cracovia from 1925 to 1926 when he transferred to its rival Wisla Krakow, for whom he played until 1935. He was a slightly built though athletic man, who played in his spectacles.

== Personal life and death ==
In the German occupation of Poland in the Second World War Pychowski worked with the Polish underground resistance. In October 1943, finding the Gestapo surrounding the building where he lived in Krakow, he committed suicide to avoid anticipated capture although the Germans were seeking another person. He is buried in the Salwator Cemetery in Krakow.

== Honours ==
Wisła Kraków

- Ekstraklasa: 1927, 1928
- Polish Cup: 1925–26
