= Maksymilian Koźmin =

Polish footballer

Personal information
- Date of birth: 19 February 1906
- Place of birth: Kraków, Austria-Hungary
- Date of death: 20 July 1983 (aged 77)
- Place of death: Kraków, Poland
- Height: 1.76 m (5 ft 9 in)
- Position: Goalkeeper

Senior career*
Years	Team	Apps	(Gls)
1922–1927	Zwierzyniecki Kraków		
1927–1936	Wisła Kraków		
1937–1939	Zwierzyniecki Kraków		

International career
1930–1931	Poland	2	(0)
- * Club domestic league appearances and goals

Maksymilian Koźmin (19 February 1906 – 20 July 1983) was a Polish footballer who played as a goalkeeper.

He made two appearances for the Poland national team from 1930 to 1931.

== Honours ==
Wisła Kraków

- Ekstraklasa: 1927, 1928
