= Mieczysław Balcer =

Polish footballer

Personal information
- Date of birth: 12 June 1906
- Place of birth: Kraków, Galicia, Austria-Hungary
- Date of death: 13 March 1995 (aged 88)
- Place of death: Poznań, Poland
- Height: 1.78 m (5 ft 10 in)
- Position: Striker

Senior career*
Years	Team	Apps	(Gls)
1916	Cracovia		
1917–1935	Wisła Kraków		
1945	Warta Poznań		

International career
1924–1934	Poland	10	(8)

Managerial career
- 1938: Unia Lublin (youth)
- 1945–1946: Warta Poznań
- 1951–1952: Kolejarz Poznań
- * Club domestic league appearances and goals

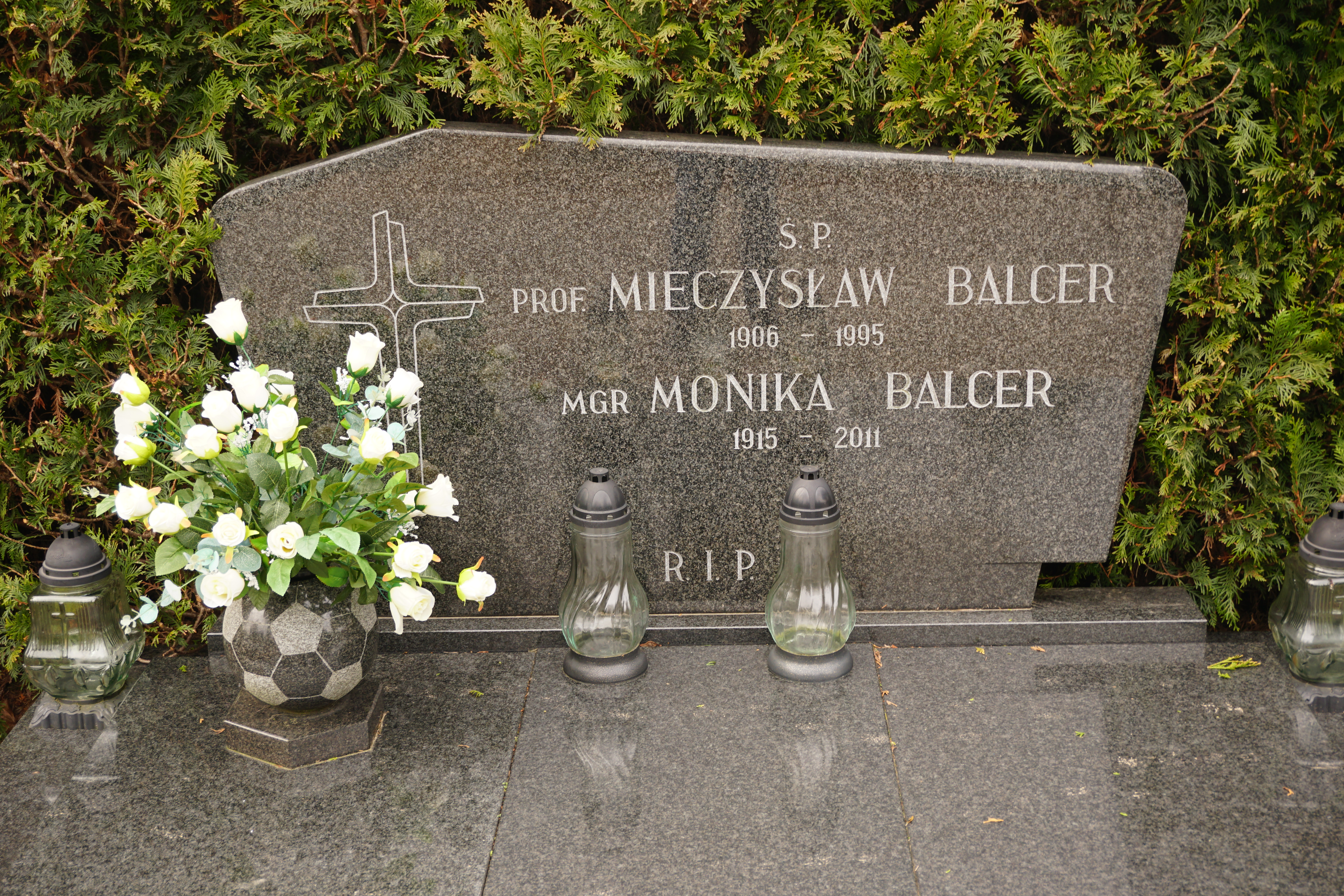
Grave of Mieczysław Balcer

Mieczysław Balcer (12 June 1906 – 13 March 1995) was a Polish footballer who played as a striker, who later served as a manager. He played in ten matches for the Poland national football team from 1924 to 1934, scoring eight goals.

== Honours ==
Wisła Kraków

- Ekstraklasa: 1927, 1928
- Polish Cup: 1925–26
