= Józef Kotlarczyk =

Polish footballer (1907–1959)

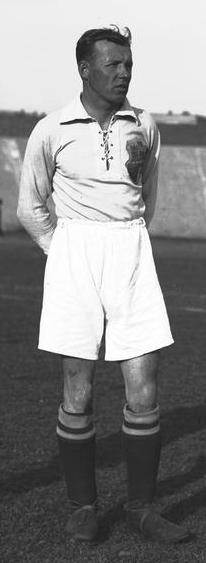

Personal information
- Date of birth: 13 February 1907
- Place of birth: Kraków, Austria-Hungary
- Date of death: 28 September 1959 (aged 52)
- Place of death: Bydgoszcz, Poland
- Height: 1.77 m (5 ft 9 1/2 in)
- Positions: Midfielder; forward

Senior career*
Years	Team	Apps	(Gls)
1922–1927	Nadwiślan Kraków		
1927–1939	Wisła Kraków	244	(13)

International career
1930–1937	Poland	30	(0)
- * Club domestic league appearances and goals

Józef Kotlarczyk (13 February 1907 – 28 September 1959) was a Polish footballer who played as a midfielder or forward. He capped 30 times for the Poland national team from 1931 to 1937. His brother Jan was also a footballer.

Kotlarczyk began his career in a local team Nadwiślan Kraków, and in 1927 moved to Wisła Kraków, where he played until 1939, scoring 13 goals in 244 games. He was the captain of Wisła, as well as of the Poland national team. In 1936, he played for Poland during the 1936 Summer Olympics. At first, Kotlarczyk was a forward, then moved to midfield. He was a very aggressive player, always keen on attacking the opponent.

== Honours ==
Wisła Kraków

- Ekstraklasa: 1927, 1928
