= 1928 Ekstraklasa =

8th season of top-tier football league in Poland

Liga
- Season: 1928
- Champions: Wisła Kraków (2nd title)
- Relegated: Hasmonea Lwów; Śląsk Świętochłowice; TKS Toruń
- Matches played: 210
- Goals scored: 852 (4.06 per match)
- Top goalscorer: Ludwik Gintel (28 goals)

The 1928 Ekstraklasa was contested by 15 teams, and Wisła Kraków won the championship.

== League table ==
Pos	Team	Pld	W	D	L	GF	GA	GD	Pts
1	Wisła Kraków (C)	28	20	2	6	98	36	+62	42
2	Warta Poznań	28	16	8	4	63	39	+24	40
3	Legia Warsaw	28	17	2	9	77	43	+34	36
4	KS Cracovia	28	15	6	7	70	42	+28	36
5	1. FC Kattowitz	28	16	3	9	64	49	+15	35
6	Pogoń Lwów	28	14	3	11	61	55	+6	31
7	Polonia Warsaw	28	14	2	12	63	61	+2	30
8	Czarni Lwów	28	13	3	12	54	51	+3	29
9	Klub Turystów Łódź	28	13	3	12	51	49	+2	29
10	Warszawianka Warszawa	28	11	7	10	50	60	−10	29
11	ŁKS Łódź	28	10	5	13	58	57	+1	25
12	Ruch Chorzów	28	10	5	13	43	54	−11	25
13	Hasmonea Lwów (R)	28	6	3	19	43	71	−28	15
14	Śląsk Świętochłowice (R)	28	5	2	21	29	86	−57	12
15	TKS Toruń (R)	28	2	2	24	28	99	−71	6

Source: 90minut.pl (in Polish)
(C) Champions; (R) Relegated

== Results ==
Home \ Away	KAT	CRA	CZA	HAS	KTŁ	LEG	ŁKS	POG	PWA	RUC	ŚWI	TKS	WAW	WAR	WIS
1. FC Kattowitz		1–1	2–4	5–0	2–1	4–1	1–0	1–0	0–2	4–0	5–0	5–3	2–0	2–1	1–1
Cracovia	6–1		6–0	3–2	5–1	2–0	7–1	3–1	0–1	2–2	2–1	3–0 (Note: Match awarded.)	1–1	5–2	2–1
Czarni Lwów	2–3	4–3		3–0	4–1	0–1	3–1	1–1	3–0	1–0	3–0	2–0	3–0	2–3	2–3
Hasmonea Lwów	4–2	0–2	1–3		0–1	2–2	3–1	0–3	1–4	3–4	0–3	5–1	0–3	1–3	0–1
Union Touring Łódź	3–2	1–1	3–0	3–2		3–1	1–1	5–4	5–0	0–0	2–1	3–0	3–0	1–3	0–3
Legia Warsaw	4–3	3–2	1–2	7–1	4–1		3–0	7–0	3–0	5–0	3–1	1–2	4–2	0–1	1–0
ŁKS Łódź	0–3	0–0	2–0	2–2	1–0	0–1		1–5	2–0	1–2	8–3	6–0	3–3	2–2	2–1
Pogoń Lwów	1–2	3–2	4–0	2–0	3–2	1–1	4–3		4–3	2–1	4–0	3–0	0–1	1–1	0–2
Polonia Warsaw	1–3	1–3	1–0	5–0	2–1	4–3	3–0	3–2		3–4	8–0	3–0	3–3	1–3	2–7
Ruch Chorzów	1–2	4–1	3–3	2–1	2–1	0–2	2–4	1–3	1–2		1–0	2–1	4–1	2–2	1–1
Śląsk Świętochłowice	1–1	0–3	4–2	0–6	0–3	1–4	1–6	0–3	0–3	1–0		3–0	0–1	1–1	1–2
TKS Toruń	3–4	2–3	0–3	0–3	0–3	2–5	2–0	3–4	1–4	0–3	0–3		2–5	2–2	2–7
Warszawianka	3–0	1–1	3–3	0–3	3–2	1–7	0–5	3–0	1–1	3–1	3–2	3–0		1–1	2–1
Warta Poznań	3–1	3–0	2–1	2–2	0–1	6–2	3–2	3–2	4–1	1–0	3–0	2–2	2–1		2–0
Wisła Kraków	3–2	5–1	3–0	4–1	5–0	2–1	2–4	6–1	7–2	4–0	9–2	9–0	6–2	3–2	

Source: 90minut.pl (in Polish)
Legend: Blue = home team win; Yellow = draw; Red = away team win.

== Top goalscorers ==
Rank	Player	Club	Goals
1	(Poland) Ludwik Gintel	KS Cracovia	28
2	(Poland) Henryk Reyman	Wisła Kraków	27
3	(Poland) Marian Lanko	Legia Warsaw	26
