= Jan Kotlarczyk =

Polish footballer (1903–1966)

Personal information
- Full name: Jan Andrzej Kotlarczyk
- Date of birth: 22 November 1903
- Place of birth: Kraków, Austria-Hungary
- Date of death: 18 July 1966 (aged 62)
- Place of death: Kraków, Poland
- Height: 1.74 m (5 ft 9 in)
- Position: Midfielder

Senior career*
Years	Team	Apps	(Gls)
1920–1922	Nadwiślan Kraków		
1922–1936	Wisła Kraków		

International career
1928–1935	Poland	20	(0)

Managerial career
- 1946–1947: Wisła Kraków
- * Club domestic league appearances and goals

Jan Andrzej Kotlarczyk (22 November 1903 – 18 July 1966) was a Polish footballer who played as a midfielder. His brother Józef was also a footballer.

He made twenty appearances for the Poland national team from 1928 to 1935.

== Honours ==
Wisła Kraków

- Ekstraklasa: 1927, 1928
- Polish Cup: 1925–26
