= Henryk Reyman =

Polish footballer, sports official, and military officer

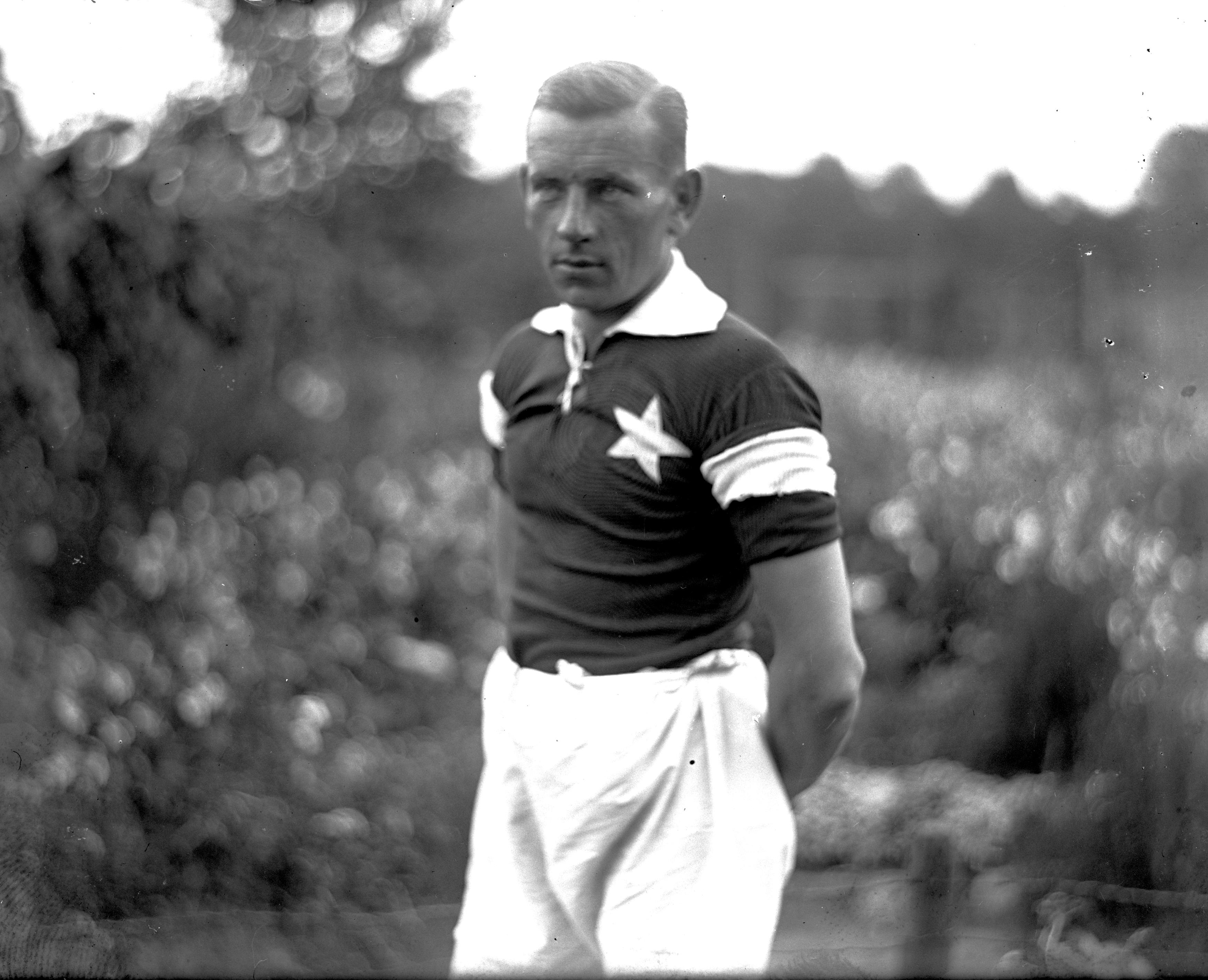

Personal information
- Full name: Henryk Tomasz Reyman
- Date of birth: 28 July 1897
- Place of birth: Kraków, Poland
- Date of death: 11 April 1963 (aged 65)
- Place of death: Kraków, Poland
- Height: 1.78 m (5 ft 10 in)
- Position: Forward

Youth career
- 1908–1910: Polonia Kraków
- 1910–1914: Wisła Kraków

Senior career*
Years	Team	Apps	(Gls)
1914–1933	Wisła Kraków	~328	(~378)

International career
1921–1928	Poland	9	(5)
- * Club domestic league appearances and goals

Henryk Tomasz Reyman (28 July 1897 – 11 April 1963) was a Polish footballer, sports official and military officer. He fought in World War I in the Austrian Army, then in the Polish Army in the Polish-Soviet War, and also participated in the Silesian Uprisings.

As a footballer, he was a one-club man for Wisła Kraków from 1910 to 1933. He scored 109 goals between 1927 and 1933. Reyman won the Polish championship twice in consecutive seasons with Wisła, in 1927 and 1928. In his first title-winning season, Reyman was the top goalscorer in the league, with 37 goals. He won 12 caps for the Poland national team, and was captain of the national team at the 1924 Olympic Games in Paris. The exact number of goals he scored for the club across all his caps is unknown, but it is estimated to be over 378 goals in 328 games. Wisła Kraków Municipal Stadium is named after him.

He died on 11 April 1963 in Kraków.

== Honours ==
Wisła Kraków

- Ekstraklasa: 1927, 1928
- Polish Cup: 1926

Individual

- Ekstraklasa top scorer: 1927
- Ekstraklasa Hall of Fame: 2022

Sporting positions
Preceded by (Poland) Józef Kałuża	Poland national team coach 11 June 1947 – 31 August 1947	Succeeded by (Poland) Andrzej Przeworski with Czesław Krug and Karol Bergtal
Preceded by (Poland) Czesław Krug	Poland national team coach 19 May 1957 – 5 October 1958	Succeeded by (Poland) Czesław Krug
