= 1927 Ekstraklasa =

7th season of top-tier football league in Poland

Liga
- Season: 1927
- Dates: 3 April 1927 – 13 November 1927
- Champions: Wisła Kraków (1st title)
- Relegated: Jutrzenka Kraków
- Matches played: 182
- Goals scored: 827 (4.54 per match)
- Top goalscorer: Henryk Reyman (37 goals)
- Biggest home win: Wisła 15–0 TKS Toruń (11 September 1927)
- Biggest away win: TKS Toruń 2–7 Wisła (19 June 1927); Jutrzenka 1–6 Czarni (17 April 1927); KT Łódź 1–6 Legia (8 May 1927); Ruch 0–5 Warta (1 November 1927)
- Highest scoring: Wisła 15–0 TKS Toruń (11 September 1927)
- Highest attendance: 25,000; 1. FC Katowice 0–2 Wisła (25 September 1927)

The 1927 Liga was the 7th edition of the Polish Football Championship (6th completed season ended with the selection of a winner) and the 1st season of the Liga (now Ekstraklasa), the top Polish professional league for association football clubs. The league was operated by the Polska Liga Piłki Nożnej (PLPN). The champions were Wisła Kraków, who won their 1st Polish title.

== Competition modus ==
The season started on 3 April 1927 and concluded on 13 November 1927 (spring-autumn league). The season was played as a round-robin tournament. The team at the top of the standings won the league title. A total of 14 teams participated. Each team played a total of 26 matches, half at home and half away, two games against each other team. Teams received two points for a win and one point for a draw.

== League table ==
Pos	Team	Pld	W	D	L	GF	GA	GD	Pts
1	Wisła Kraków (C)	26	19	2	5	95	32	+63	40
2	1. FC Katowice	26	18	0	8	67	43	+24	36
3	Warta Poznań	26	15	2	9	79	55	+24	32
4	Pogoń Lwów	26	13	3	10	65	42	+23	29
5	Legia Warsaw	26	12	3	11	70	65	+5	27
6	Klub Turystów Łódź	26	12	3	11	52	57	−5	27
7	ŁKS Łódź	26	11	3	12	54	51	+3	25
8	Polonia Warsaw	26	9	7	10	61	68	−7	25
9	Czarni Lwów	26	10	4	12	45	50	−5	24
10	TKS Toruń	26	10	4	12	56	86	−30	24
11	Hasmonea Lwów	26	8	7	11	55	78	−23	23
12	Ruch Hajduki Wielkie	26	9	5	12	35	54	−19	23
13	Warszawianka Warszawa	26	8	2	16	52	64	−12	18
14	Jutrzenka Kraków (R)	26	3	5	18	41	82	−41	11

Source: 90minut.pl (in Polish)
(C) Champions; (R) Relegated

== Results ==
Home \ Away	KAT	CZA	HAS	JUT	KTŁ	LEG	ŁKS	POG	PWA	RUC	TKS	WAW	WAR	WIS
1. FC Kattowitz		2–0	9–3	5–1	4–1	2–3	4–1	1–0	4–3	7–0	5–2	3–2	1–5	0–2
Czarni Lwów	0–1		2–3	3–2	3–0	2–1	0–4	3–1	1–1	2–1	0–4	1–0	3–3	2–3
Hasmonea Lwów	2–4	3–0		2–1	3–3	0–2	3–0	2–2	2–2	2–2	2–5	1–2	7–5	2–2
Jutrzenka Kraków	1–2	1–6	2–2		0–0	5–4	2–2	2–3	0–0	1–3	2–4	4–1	1–1	0–4
Klub Turystów Łódź	2–0	3–2	6–2	4–2		1–6	4–2	1–1	1–0	4–1	2–0	3–7	0–3	5–1
Legia Warsaw	5–0	2–0	4–1	5–1	5–2		6–3	4–3	2–2	1–1	6–1	1–4	3–1	1–4
ŁKS Łódź	1–2	2–2	3–0	2–1	2–0	3–1		1–0	3–4	6–2	4–1	5–2	2–1	0–0
Pogoń Lwów	0–3 (Note: Match awarded.)	3–0	1–2	2–0	0–3	11–2	2–0		3–1	0–1	8–1	2–1	6–2	4–1
Polonia Warsaw	3–1	3–3	9–2	3–2	0–3	2–1	2–1	3–3		3–5	2–5	3–3	1–5	2–1
Ruch Hajduki Wielkie	0–2	2–1	1–1	1–3	2–0	3–1	1–3	0–2	0–3		0–0	0–0	0–5	0–4
TKS Toruń	1–3	0–1	0–2	4–3	2–1	2–2	1–0	3–5	4–3	0–4		4–2	6–3	2–7
Warszawianka	1–2	1–5	5–1	8–2	1–2	2–1	2–1	3–0	2–4	0–1	0–2		1–5	0–2
Warta Poznań	1–0	0–3	3–4	4–0	3–0	8–1	5–2	2–1	4–1	1–4	4–2	1–0		3–2
Wisła Kraków	3–0	4–0	3–1	7–2	5–1	1–0	3–1	0–2	7–1	2–0	15–0	8–2	4–1	

Source: 90minut.pl (in Polish)
Legend: Blue = home team win; Yellow = draw; Red = away team win.

== Top goalscorers ==
Rank	Player	Club	Goals
1	(Poland) Henryk Reyman	Wisła Kraków	37
2	(Poland) Marian Łańko	Legia Warsaw	31
3	(Poland) Wacław Kuchar	Pogoń Lwów	28

== Bibliography ==
- Gowarzewski, Andrzej (2000). Encyklopedia Piłkarska Fuji. Liga Polska. O tytuł mistrza Polski 1920–2000 (in Polish). GiA, Katowice. ISBN 83-88232-02-9.
- Gowarzewski, Andrzej (1994). Encyklopedia Piłkarska Fuji. 75 lat PZPN. Księga jubileuszowa (in Polish). GiA, Katowice. ISBN 83-902751-1-2.
- Gowarzewski, Andrzej (2000). Encyklopedia Piłkarska Fuji. Album 80 lat PZPN (in Polish). GiA, Katowice.
- Gowarzewski, Andrzej (2010). Encyklopedia Piłkarska Fuji. Album 90 lat PZPN (in Polish). GiA, Katowice.
