= Czarni Lwów =

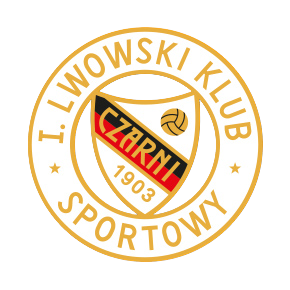
- Full name: I. Wojskowo-Cywilny; Klub Sportowy Czarni Lwów
- Nickname: Powidlaki (Marmeladers)
- Founded: 1903
- Ground: Field Marshal Józef Piłsudski Stadium
- Capacity: 12 000
Home colours	Away colours

Czarni Lwów was one of the first Polish professional sports clubs with a well-developed football section as well as ice hockey, among several other sports. The football club was started in the late 19th century in Lwów as a school football section called Sława Lwów. In 1903 the name was changed and the club became professional.

== History ==
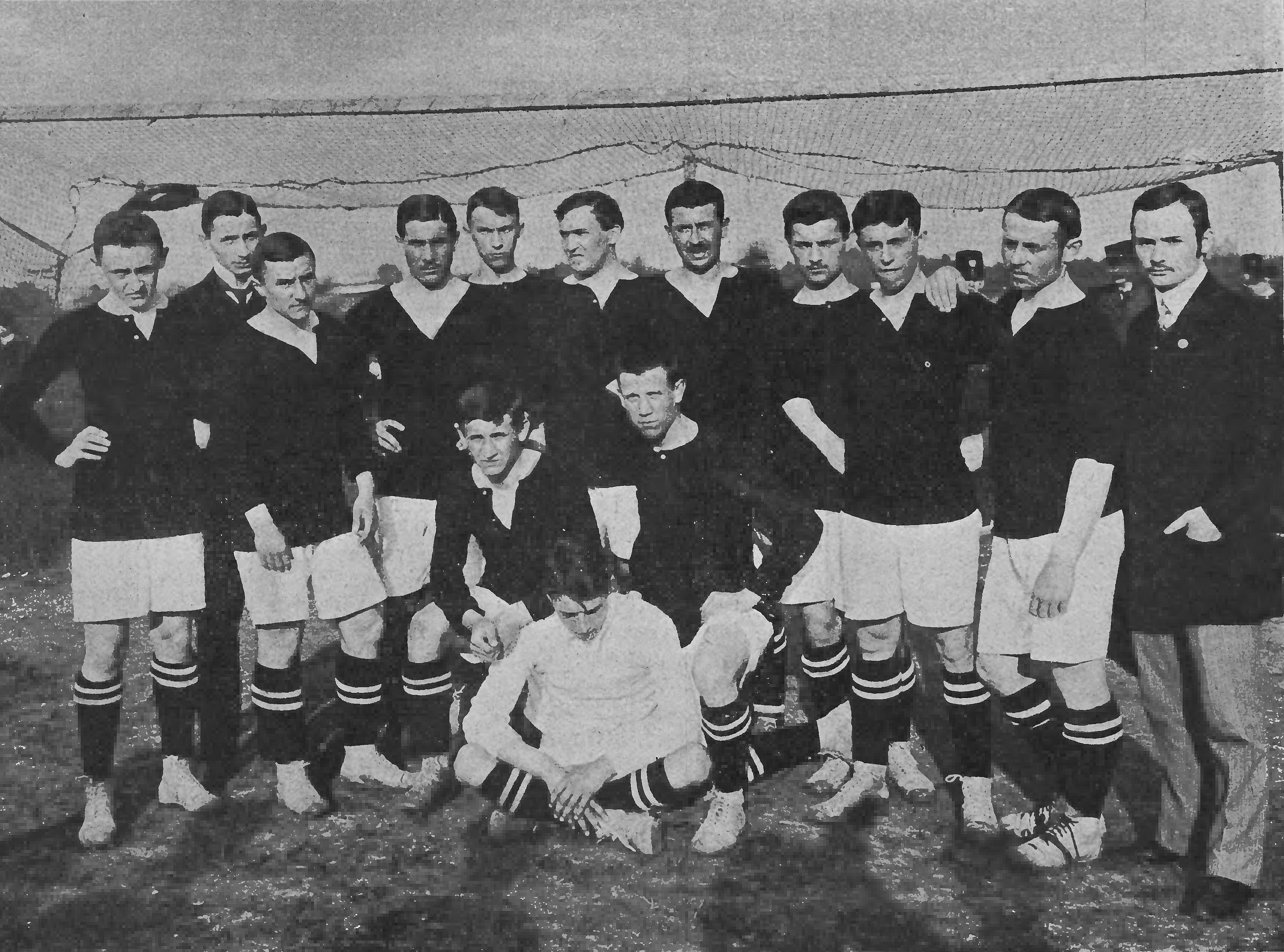
Czarni Lwów team in 1909

In 1911, together with KS Cracovia and two other teams, Czarni created the Polish Football Association, the predecessor of the modern PZPN national football association. The first football club in Poland, the Czarni (Black, name coined after their black shirts; because of their colours the team was commonly dubbed Powidlaki – an allusion to the plum marmalade colour of their logo) were the best known and most popular sports club in Lwów (together with Pogoń Lwów formed soon afterwards). The official name translates as the First Military-Civil Sport Club Blacks Lwów. Although the main interest of the fans lay in football, soon other sections were opened (ice hockey, boxing, skiing, tennis, athletics). Despite their initial successes and their contribution to the history of football in Poland, the club was largely unsuccessful in league meetings. During their seven years career in the Polish Football League, they scored 141 points, with the total goal quota of 120:186. In 1928 the club came 8th in the league, which was the highest location in its history. However, the following year Czarni's forward Rochus Nastula was the top scorer in Polish Soccer League, with 25 goals scored in one season. In 1933 the club dropped from the first league, but continued to appear in national championships.

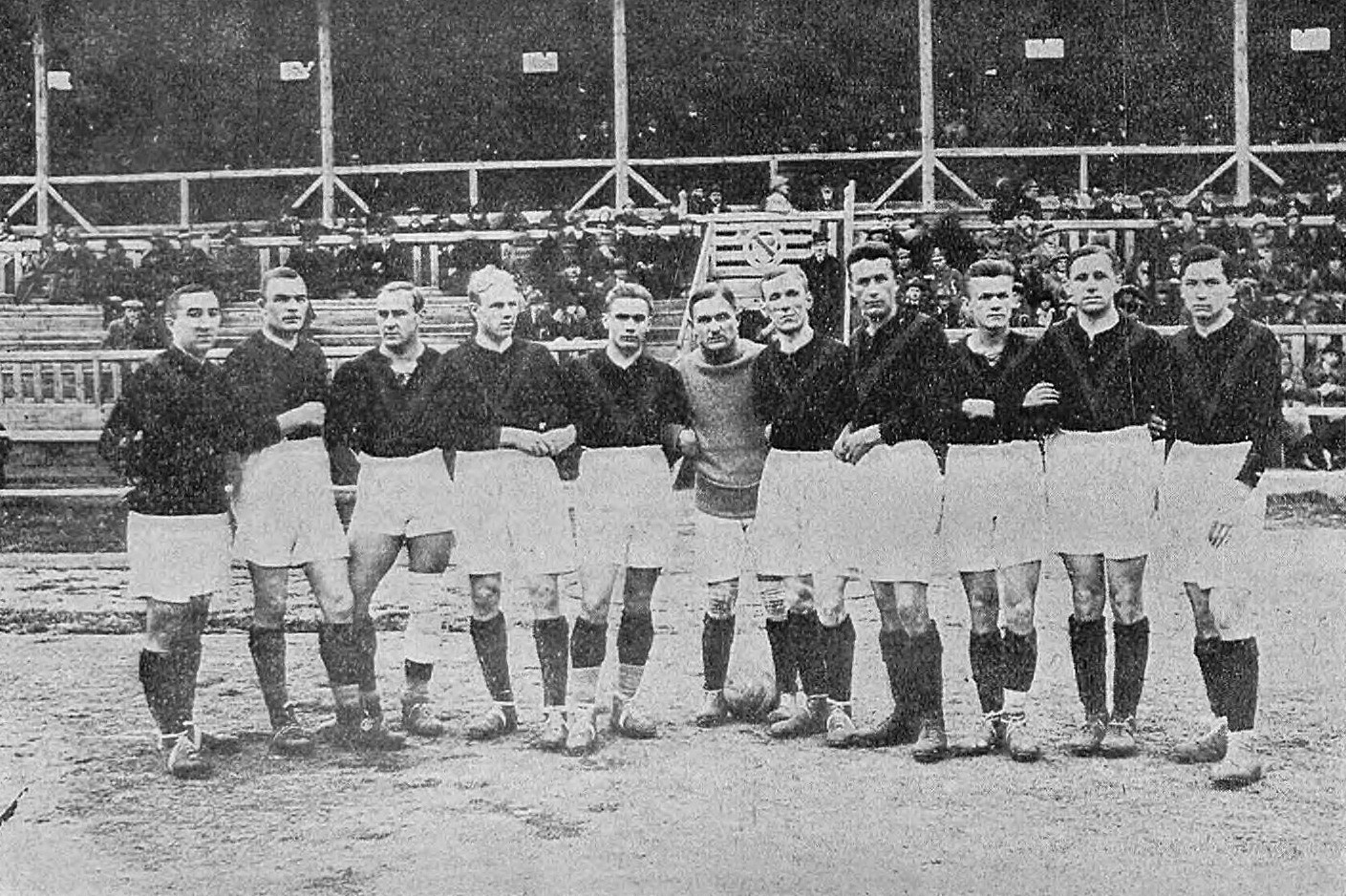
Czarni Lwów team in 1924

In 1935 the ice hockey team won the Polish Championship.

Following the German-Soviet invasion of Poland, which started World War II in September 1939, the city was occupied by the Soviet Union. The club was disbanded in 1939 by the NKVD who arrested most of its members. Two pre-war footballers, Henryk Bilor and Tadeusz Kowalski, and athlete Tadeusz Kirchner were among Poles murdered by the Russians in the large Katyn massacre in April–May 1940.

The most famous player of Czarni Lwów was Kazimierz Górski.

== See also ==
- History of football in Poland
- Lechia Lwów
- Pogoń Lwów
- Hasmonea Lwów
- Sports in Poland
