= KS Warszawianka =

Polish sports club

- Full name: Klub Sportowy Warszawianka
- Founded: 21 January 1921; 104 years ago
Home	Away

Klub Sportowy Warszawianka is a Polish multi-sport club from Warsaw. It has several sections, including handball, track and field, fencing and tennis, and in the past it had several more, including a football team which competed in the Polish top division.

Their colors are black-white, and the logo consists of a black capital letter W.

== History ==
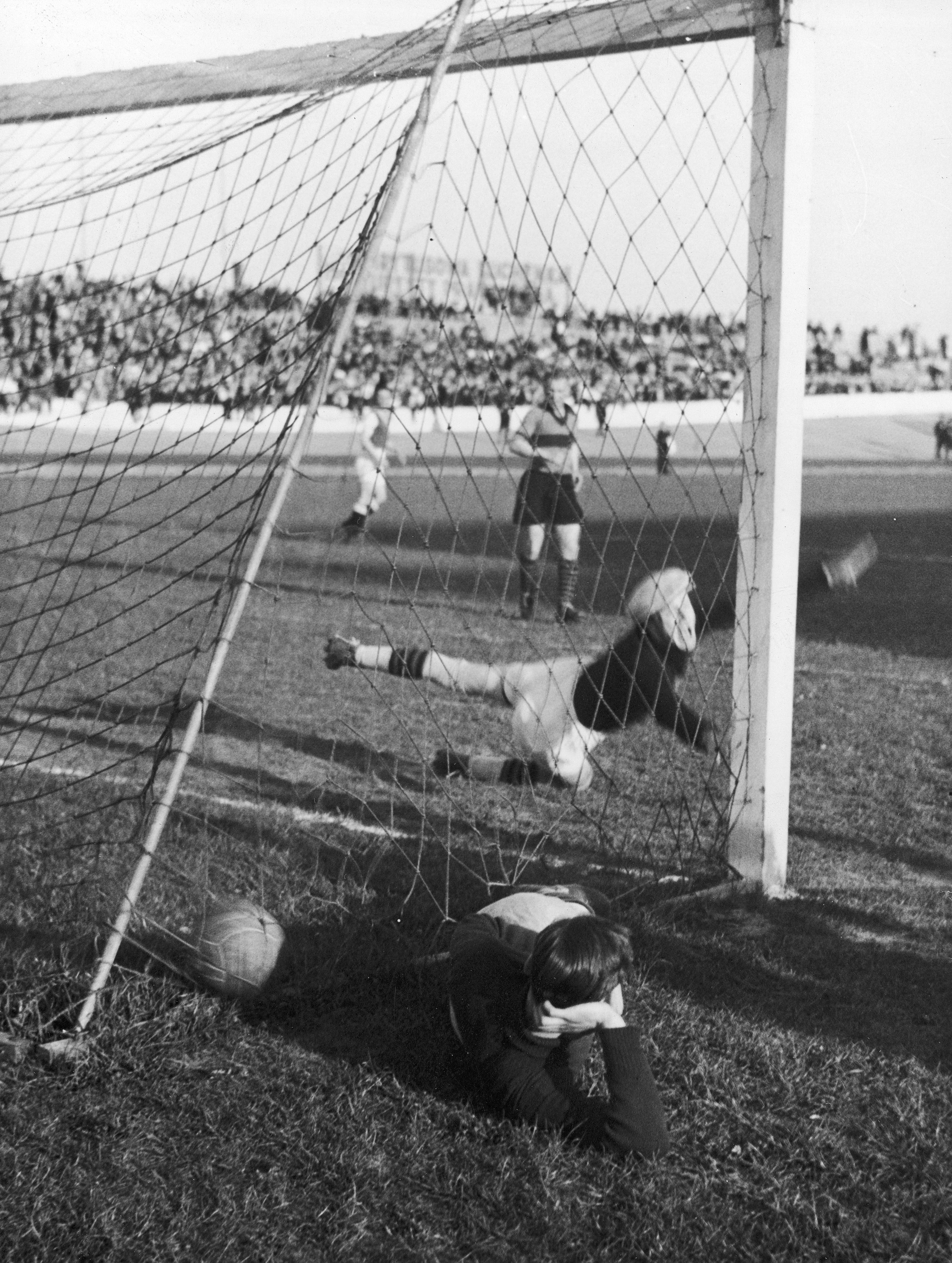
Home game with Śmigły Wilno played in the 1938 Ekstraklasa

It was founded in 1921 by the famous Warsaw families of Luxemburgs and Loths (the Loths were also co-creators of Polonia Warsaw). At first, the club's main efforts concentrated on football. Soon, Warszawianka's players achieved many successes, including the championship of Warsaw in 1925 and promotion to the Polish top division in 1927. The team stayed in the League until its last interwar season 1939. The last season was unfinished because of the joint German and Soviet invasion of Poland. Warszawianka was then 9th (out of 10 teams) and most probably would have been relegated, had it not been for the war. In the years 1927-1939, Warszawianka was never among the top teams of the League, always flirting with relegation. After the war, its football team never managed to return to the top league, and was eventually disbanded in 1971.

The handball team was founded in 1926, and, unlike the football team, it exists to this day and it achieved success in later years. It won the Polish Handball Cup twice: in 1994 and 2002. It also reached the podium in the Polish top division, finishing second in 1994 and 2002, and third in 1993 and 1999, only behind Polish handball powerhouses Iskra Kielce and Wisła Płock. As of 2022–23, it competes in the I liga.

During the years, more sport sections were added to the club. These included basketball, ice hockey, where the club was runner up in the Polish championship in 1939 and cycling. Sections for track and field, fencing, handball, and, since 1999, swimming are still active. The biggest successes in the club's history were those of track-and-fielders. Because of war and the destruction of Warsaw, Warszawianka's position as a major Polish sports organization weakened, and in the late 1940s, it did not even exist. At the beginning of the 1950s, the club was brought back to life, and in 1961, its new sport center was built. The club's football stadium, modern by pre-war standards, is now in ruin.

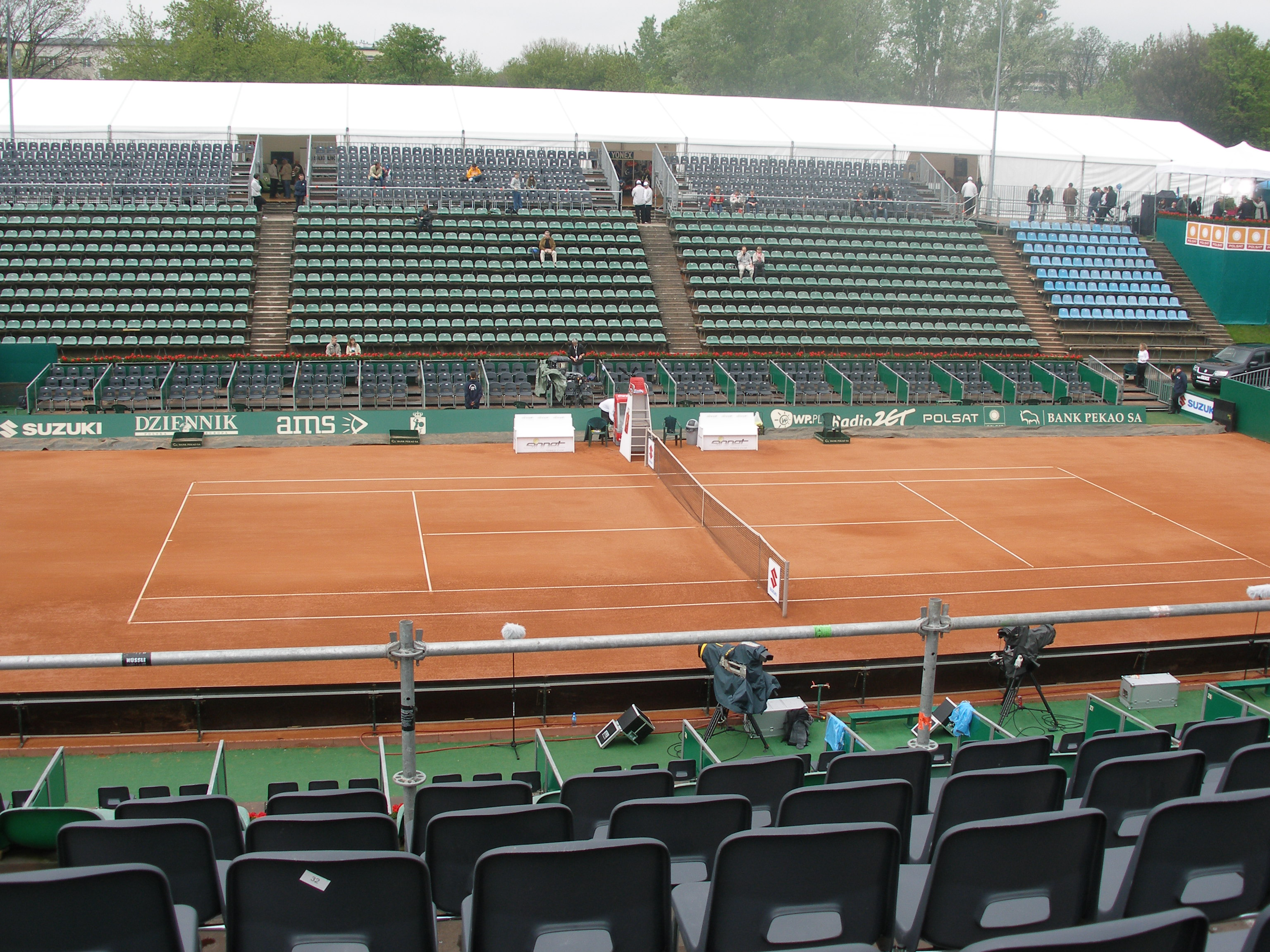
Warszawianka tennis venue

Among Warszawianka's most famous sportspeople, one can single out: Aleksander Szenajch (athletics) – 1924 Olympics in Paris, Janusz Kusociński (athletics) – 1932 Olympics in Los Angeles (a track and field event is held annually in his honor), Janusz Kalbarczyk (speedskating) – 1936 Olympics Garmisch-Partenkirchen, Emil Ochra (fencing) – 1960 and 1964 Olympics; and Stanisław Baran, a football player.

== Honours ==
- Polish Handball Championship:

Runners-up (2): 1994, 2002
Third place (2): 1993, 1999

- Polish Handball Cup

Winners (2): 1994, 2002
