= Stefan Katzy =

Polish footballer

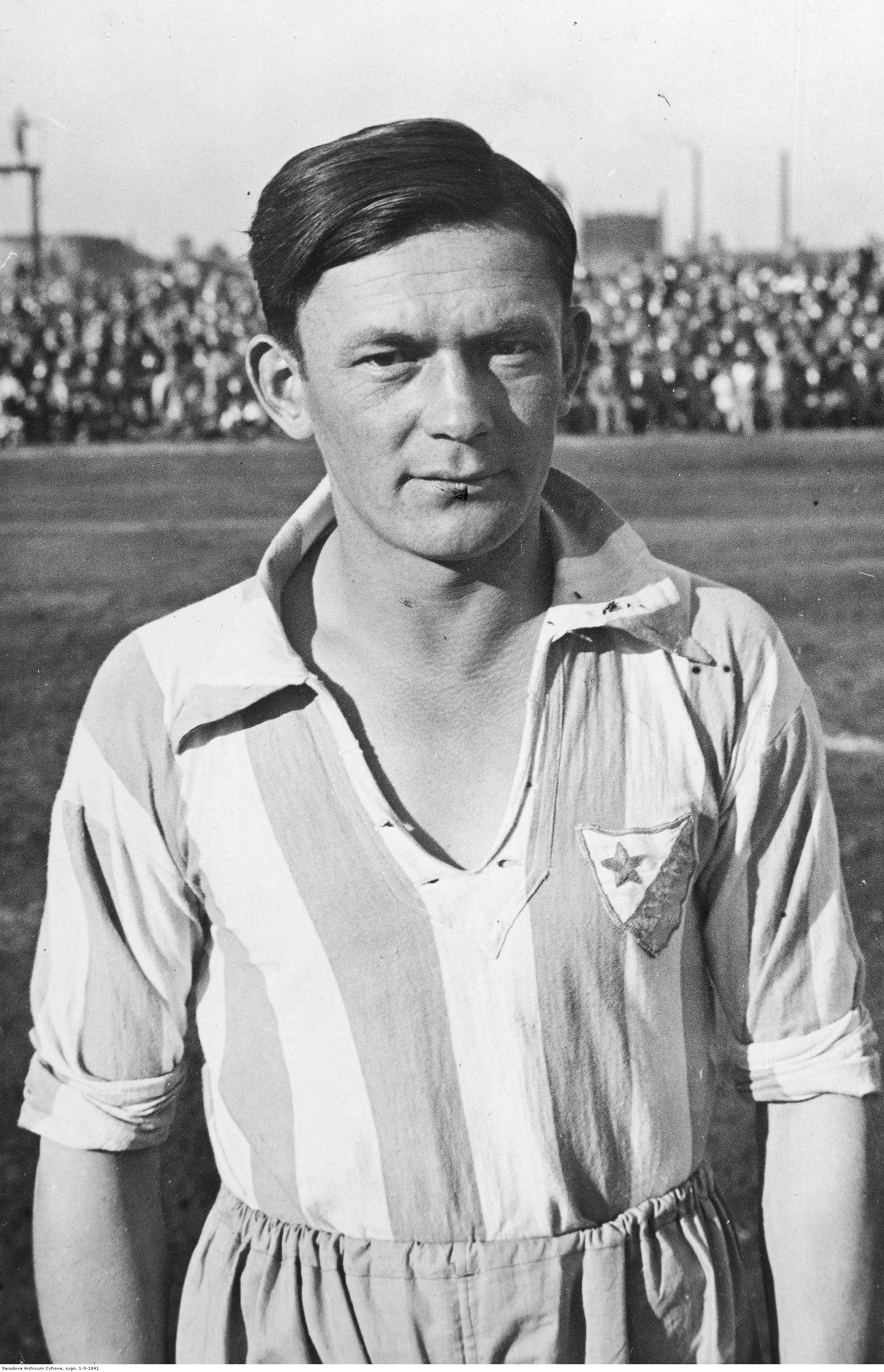
- Stefan Katzy in 1934

Personal information
- Date of birth: December 16, 1906
- Place of birth: Hajduki Wielkie
- Date of death: April 24, 1949 (aged 42)
- Place of death: Chorzów
- Height: 1.67 m (5 ft 6 in)
- Positions: Forward; defender; midfielder

Youth career
- 1920–1925: Ruch Chorzów

Senior career*
Years	Team	Apps	(Gls)
1926–1935	Ruch Chorzów	166	(17)

International career
1933–1934	Silesia	2	(0)
- * Club domestic league appearances and goals

Stefan Katzy (16 December 1906 – 24 April 1949) was a Polish footballer who spent his entire career with Ruch Chorzów, where he began as a youth player. Joining the youth team at age 14, he was promoted to the senior squad for the 1926 season. Over 10 seasons with Ruch, he won three Polish championships in 1933, 1934, and 1935. He served as team captain from 1931 to 1933.

== Football career ==
Born on 16 December 1906 in Hajduki Wielkie, Stefan Katzy began training with Ruch Chorzów's youth team in 1920. A versatile player, he could perform as a forward, left or right defender, or midfielder. In January 1926, he played as a centre-forward in the final of the 1925–26 Stanisław Flieger Cup, where Ruch defeated 06 Załęże 3–2 on 10 January 1926, qualifying for the Polish Cup as Silesia's top team. Katzy featured in a 1–0 semi-final loss to Wisła Kraków on 4 July 1926. In the Silesian A-Class, Ruch finished first, earning a spot in the 1926 Polish Championship. Katzy played in two losses against Warta Poznań (6–0 on 29 August 1926 and 4–2 on 19 September 1926) and a 2–2 draw with Klub Turystów Łódź on 21 October 1926. In December, Ruch won the second edition of the Stanisław Flieger Cup, defeating 06 Załęże 4–2 in extra time on 8 December 1926, with Katzy scoring one goal.

In the 1927 season, Ruch finished 12th in the league. Katzy played all 26 league matches, serving as a forward or midfielder, and led the team with 14 goals. In a 3–1 loss to ŁKS Łódź on 21 April 1927, he played left wing in place of Karol Frost, drawing criticism: "He never stayed in position, and when passing, he positioned himself incorrectly, kicking with his right foot as if he couldn't use his left. Placing Katzy on the left wing instead of Frost is the management's biggest mistake". In a 0–0 draw against Warszawianka on 1 May 1927, he missed a penalty and shifted from an attacking role to defender. From May to June, he scored in six consecutive league matches. In a 6–2 win over Polonia Warsaw on 7 August 1927, he scored four goals, but the match was later awarded as a walkover to Polonia. In a 6–2 win over ŁKS Łódź on 9 October 1927 and a 1–1 draw with Legia Warsaw on 16 October 1927, he replaced Paweł Kutz in defence.

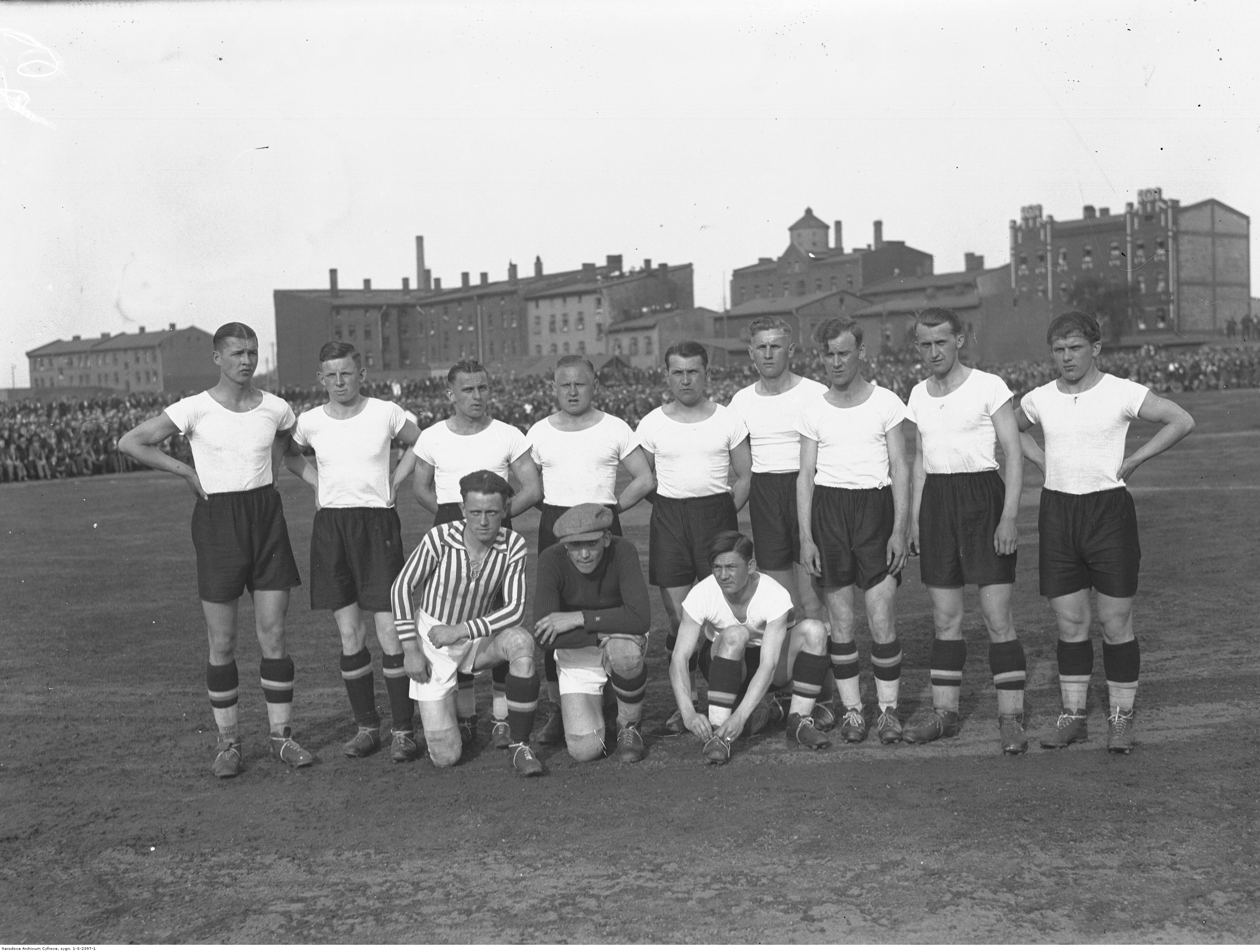
Ruch Chorzów before a match against Wisła Kraków (4–1, 29 April 1934). Katzy is first from the right in the bottom row

In the 1928 season, Ruch finished 12th. Katzy played all 23 league matches, scoring three goals, starting as a forward for the first four rounds before playing as a midfielder or defender. After a 2–1 loss to Polonia Warsaw on 15 April 1928, the press blamed Katzy for the defeat, citing his "lethargic" play, excessive dribbling, and frequent turnovers. In a 1–0 loss to Warta Poznań on 24 June 1928, he scored an own goal.

In the 1929 season, Ruch finished 10th at the end of the competition. Katzy played all 24 league matches as a defender from the season's start. In a 1–1 draw with Garbarnia Kraków on 21 April 1929, he scored an own goal with a header. In a 1–1 draw with 1. FC Katowice on 15 September 1929, he conceded a penalty in the first half. In the 15th minute of the match, Katzy fell in his own penalty area and caught the ball with his hands, which the goalkeeper Herman Kremer had failed to reach after the opponents' shot.

In the 1930 season, Ruch finished 8th. Katzy played 21 league matches.

In the 1931 season, Ruch finished 5th. Katzy played 19 league matches. In a 4–1 loss to KS Cracovia on 28 June 1931, he was sent off for "inappropriate protest" after conceding a goal. He took over as team captain from Józef Sobota and held the role for three seasons.

In the 1932 season, Ruch lost their final three league matches, finishing 7th. Katzy played 12 league matches.

In the 1933 season, Ruch won the Polish championship. Katzy played 19 league matches, missing only the season opener against Garbarnia Kraków (6–0 on 2 April 1933). In a friendly match against Polonia Karwina (4–1 on 14 May 1933), he was sent off for criticizing the referee. In October, he played for the Silesia national team in a 2–1 loss to the Poland national team on 4 October 1933.

In the 1934 season, Ruch defended their championship title. Katzy played 18 league matches. In a 2–1 loss to Wisła Kraków on 2 September 1934, he was kicked by Bolesław Habrowski and retaliated, resulting in his ejection. In April, he played in a 3–0 friendly win for Silesia against the Kraków team on 15 April 1934.

In the 1935 season, Ruch won their third consecutive championship. Katzy played one league match, a 6–0 win over Legia Warsaw on 20 June 1935. He retired after the season, with Antoni Rurański taking his place.

== Statistics ==
=== Club (1926–1935) ===
Season	Club	League	Domestic league		Polish Cup		Total	
Season	Club	League	Matches	Goals	Matches	Goals	Matches	Goals
1926	Ruch Chorzów	I Liga	3	0	1	0	4	0
1927	Ruch Chorzów	I Liga	26	14	–		26	14
1928	Ruch Chorzów	I Liga	23	3	–		23	3
1929	Ruch Chorzów	I Liga	24	0	–		24	0
1930	Ruch Chorzów	I Liga	21	0	–		21	0
1931	Ruch Chorzów	I Liga	19	0	–		19	0
1932	Ruch Chorzów	I Liga	12	0	–		12	0
1933	Ruch Chorzów	I Liga	19	0	–		19	0
1934	Ruch Chorzów	I Liga	18	0	–		18	0
1935	Ruch Chorzów	I Liga	1	0	–		1	0
Total			166	17	1	0	167	17

=== Silesia National Team (1933–1934) ===
Matches and goals for Silesia
No.	Date	Venue	Opponent	Result	Competition
1.	4 October 1933	Katowice, Poland	Poland	1–2	Friendly
2.	15 April 1934	Chorzów, Poland	Kraków	3–0	Friendly

== Personal life ==
Katzy was an electrical technician by profession. His younger brother, Aleksander, played for Ruch Chorzów's reserve team. Katzy died at age 42 following a serious stomach operation. He was named an honorary member of Ruch Chorzów.

== Bibliography ==
- Gowarzewski, Andrzej; Waloszek, Joachim (1995). Ruch Chorzów (in Polish). Katowice: GiA Katowice. ISBN 83-902751-3-9.
- Gowarzewski, Andrzej (2017). Mistrzostwa Polski. Ludzie (1918-1939). 100 lat prawdziwej historii [Polish Championships. People (1918–1939). 100 Years of True History] (in Polish). Katowice: GiA Katowice. ISBN 978-83-88232-61-9.
