= President of Poland's Football Cup =

President of Poland's Football Cup (Polish: Puchar Prezydenta Rzeczypospolitej Polskiej) was an annual football competition, taking place in the Second Polish Republic in the years 1936–1939. It was sponsored by President Ignacy Mościcki, and unlike today's Polish Cup, it did not feature clubs. Instead, it was a competition of the local districts of the PZPN (for example the team of Kraków's district of the PZPN consisted of selected best players of such clubs, as Wisła Kraków, Cracovia, and Garbarnia Kraków).

First two editions of the Cup (1936–1937) did not feature top players of the Ekstraklasa (see: Polish Football League (1927–1939)). In the 1938 and 1939 games, all best footballers participated in the competition.

== 1936 games ==
=== First stage, May 24, 1936 ===
- Wilno, Wilno – The B Team of the Polish Football League 2–1 (att. 4000),
- Bydgoszcz, Pomerania – Upper Silesia 3–2,
- Stanisławów, Stanisławów – Lwów 2–1 (att. 3500),
- Lublin, Lublin – Kraków 4–4,
- Częstochowa, Kielce – Poznań 2–4,
- Białystok, Białystok – Łódź 0–2,
- Warsaw, Warsaw – Polesie 9–0,
- Łuck, Wołyń – The A Team of the Polish Football League 3–6 (att. 8000).

=== Quarterfinals, August 2, 1936 ===
- Kraków, Kraków – Warsaw 4–0,
- Poznań, Poznań – Wilno 6–1,
- Bydgoszcz, Pomerania – Łódź 4–3,
- Stanisławów, Stanisławów – The A Team of the Polish Football League 2-2. The game was repeated in Stanisławów on November 8, 1936. This time, the A Team of the League routed the home side 5–1. The winners featured such Poland National Team players, as Ernest Wilimowski, Gerard Wodarz, Jan Wasiewicz, Spirydion Albański, Hubert Gad, Edmund Giemsa, and Ewald Dytko.

=== Semifinals, November 15, 1936 ===
- Kraków, Kraków – The A Team of the Polish Football League 5-3 after extra time (att. 5000). The team of Kraków was based mostly on players of Cracovia (such as Józef Korbas, and Wilhelm Góra),
- Poznań, Poznań – Pomerania 5–0 (att. 1000).

=== Final, November 22, 1936 ===
- Poznań, Poznań – Kraków 0–2 (att. 1500).

== 1937 games ==
=== First stage, June 20, 1937 ===
- Lwów, Lwów – Stanisławów 1–2 (att. 3000)
- Białystok, Białystok – Warsaw 3–5 (att. 2500),
- Łódź, Łódź – Pomerania 2–1 (att. 1500),
- Lutsk, Volhynia – Lublin 2–1,
- Brzesc nad Bugiem, Polesie – Wilno 3–5,
- Sosnowiec. Kielce – Upper Silesia 0–4 (att. 2000),

=== Quarterfinals, July 4, 1937 ===
- Katowice. Upper Silesia – Poznań 3–0 (att. 1500),
- Lutsk, Volhynia – Wilno 0–1 (att. 3000),
- Stanisławów, Stanisławów – Kraków 1–4 (att. 3000),
- Warsaw, Warsaw – Łódź 3–0.

=== Semifinals, September 12, 1937 and October 10, 1937 ===
- Wilno, Wilno – Kraków 1–2 (att. 2000),
- Warsaw, Warsaw – Upper Silesia 1–4,

=== Final, November 14, 1937 ===
- Warsaw, Upper Silesia – Kraków 5–1 (att. 1500).

== 1938 games ==
=== First stage, May 22, 1938 ===
- Białystok, Białystok – Wilno 0–1,
- Brzesc nad Bugiem, Polesie – Warsaw 1–7,
- Lutsk, Volhynia – Stanisławów 2–3,
- Sosnowiec, Zagłębie Dąbrowskie – Łódź 3–4,
- Bydgoszcz, Pomorze – Poznań 4–2,
- Lublin, Lublin – Lwów 3–4,

=== Quarterfinals, July 17, 1938 ===
- Wilno, Wilno – Warsaw 0–3. The home team was entirely made of players of Śmigły Wilno, while Warsaw featured such footballers as Henryk Martyna, Erwin Nyc, and Stanisław Baran,
- Lwów, Lwów – Upper Silesia 7–1. The home team was based on players of Pogoń Lwów. Upper Silesia fielded, among others, Ewald Cebula, Teodor Peterek, and Ryszard Piec (att. 4000),
- Łódź, Łódź – Pomerania 2–1 (att. 2500),
- Stanisławów, Stanisławów – Kraków 0–2.

=== Semifinals ===
- Łódź, Łódź – Lwów 2–3,
- Kraków, Kraków – Warsaw 5–3,

=== Final, November 27, 1938 ===
- Lwów, Lwów – Kraków 5–1. Lwów fielded six players of Pogoń Lwów (i.e. Michał Matyas), while Kraków featured Edward Madejski, Wilhelm Góra, and Jan Kotlarczyk. One player Oleksandr Skotsen' represented Ukraina Lwów (Lwów Voivodeship Class A).

== 1939 games ==
=== First round, May 3, 1939 ===
- Łódź, Łódź – Upper Silesia 2–4. The home team fielded Antoni Gałecki, and the Silesians brought a score of top-class players, such as Ernest Wilimowski, Ryszard Piec, Wilhelm Piec, Edmund Giemsa, Hubert Gad, Gerard Wodarz, and Ewald Cebula (att. 600),
- Brzesc nad Bugiem, Polesie – Wilno 1–5 (att. 3000),
- Toruń, Pomerania – Białystok 9–0 (att. 1000),
- Sosnowiec. Zagłębie Dąbrowskie – Poznań 3–4 (att. 4000),
- Lutsk. Volhynia – Warsaw 1–5 (att. 3000),
- Stanisławów. Stanisławów – Lublin 3–1 (att. 2000).

=== Quarterfinals, June 29, 1939 ===
- Stanisławów. Stanisławów – Lwów 5–2. The visitors fielded a selection of the best players of the city, including eight footballers of Pogoń Lwów, and Aleksandr Skocen of Ukraina Lwów (att. 3000),
- Warsaw. Warsaw – Wilno 1–2. Among home team players, there were Władysław Szczepaniak, and Henryk Jaźnicki (att. 1000),
- Bydgoszcz. Pomerania – Upper Silesia 3–4. The Silesians fielded eight starters of the Poland National Team,
- Poznań. Poznań – Kraków 3–0. Home team fielded Kazimierz Lis and Edmund Białas, the visitors brought Edward Jabłoński, Wilhelm Góra, and Paweł Cyganek.

=== Semifinals, August, 6 and 15, 1939 ===
- Wilno. Wilno – Stanisławów 0–1 (att. 1000),
- Katowice. Upper Silesia – Poznań 0–2 (att. 2000).

=== Final, November 5, 1939 ===
- Stanisławów – Poznań. The game did not take place due to the Nazi and Soviet attack on Poland, which marked the outbreak of World War II.

== See also ==
- Football in Poland
- Poland national football team
- Polish football in the interwar period
- Polish Football League (1927–1939)
