= Władysław Olearczyk =

Polish footballer

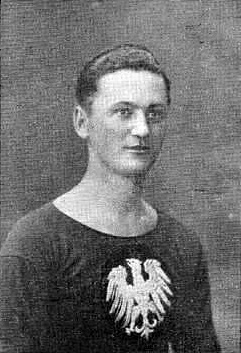

Personal information
- Date of birth: 8 June 1898
- Place of birth: Przemyśl, Poland
- Date of death: 21 February 1970 (aged 71)
- Place of death: Cieszyn, Poland
- Height: 1.80 m (5 ft 11 in)
- Position: Defender

Senior career*
Years	Team	Apps	(Gls)
1921–1929	Pogoń Lwów		

International career
1923–1925	Poland	4	(0)
- * Club domestic league appearances and goals

Władysław Olearczyk (8 June 1898 – 21 February 1970) was a Polish footballer who played as a defender. He played in four matches for the Poland national football team from 1923 to 1925.

== Honours ==
Pogoń Lwów

- Polish Football Championship: 1922, 1923, 1925, 1926
