= Polish Football League (1927–1939) =

== Beginnings ==
In the years 1921–1926, the football championships were organized in a non-league way. Firstly, there were regional games, then 9 champions of those regions were divided into 3 groups - western, southern and northern (with 3 teams in each) and finally, there were champions of these groups playing each other in the big finale.

However, this was not practical and some time in early 1927, representatives of several Polish clubs decided to follow other European countries (with the exception of Germany) and organize the all-national Polish Football League. This proposal was strongly opposed by PZPN (Polish Football Association) and by one of strongest football organizations of the country - Cracovia, whose director was also the director of PZPN.

== First season - 1927 ==
Nevertheless, even without PZPN's support, the teams decided to go on with their idea. The League was officially formed on March 1, 1927 and on April 3, 1927 first games of the 14-team League took place. Originally, a spot in it was reserved for Cracovia, but after its refusal, it was given to Jutrzenka Kraków. The first, historic champion of the League became Wisła Kraków, but only after a fierce competition with a German-minority team 1. FC Katowice. Relegated was only one team, this was Jutrzenka.

On December 18, 1927, PZPN post factum officially announced that champion of the League was champion of Poland, and this automatically ended the conflict. It also meant that Cracovia would enter the League.

This is the list of teams which in November 1927 finished the games (notice: in interbellum Poland, games of the League were held in spring-autumn order):

1. TS Wisła Kraków

2. 1. FC Katowice

3. Warta Poznań

4. Pogoń Lwów

5. WKS Legia Warszawa

6. Klub Turystow Łódź

7. Łódź

8. Polonia Warszawa

9. 1. LKS Czarni Lwów

10. Toruń

11. ŻKS Hasmonea Lwów

12. Ruch Wielkie Hajduki

13. Warszawianka Warszawa

RELEGATED:

14. ŻTS Jutrzenka Kraków

All clubs were Klub Sportowy (KS) - Sports Clubs except otherwise noted. For example, Legia was a military sport club (Wojskowy Klub Sportowy). TS stands for sport association (Towarzystwo Sportowe). Ż identifies that a club is Jewish - Żydowskie.

== Games of the late 1920s ==
=== 1928 ===
After the 1927 season, Jutrzenka Kraków was relegated and Śląsk Świętochłowice won promotion, but since Cracovia came to terms with the League, this renowned team was automatically added. As a result, there was an unusual situation, with 15 teams on the League. Wisła Kraków again turned out to be the best, with Warta Poznań finishing on the second position. Relegated were 3 teams - Hasmonea Lwów, Śląsk Świętochłowice, and TKS Toruń.

This is the final table:

1. Wisła Kraków.

2. Warta Poznań.

3. Legia Warszawa.

4. Cracovia (newcomer).

5. 1. FC Katowice.

6. Pogoń Lwów.

7. Polonia Warszawa.

8. Czarni Lwów.

9. Klub Turystow Łódź.

10. Warszawianka Warszawa.

11. ŁKS Łódź.

12. Ruch Chorzów.

RELEGATED:

13. Hasmonea Lwów.

14. Śląsk Świętochłowice (newcomer).

15. TKS Toruń.

=== 1929 ===
Three sides were relegated and one (Garbarnia Kraków) promoted, which again meant uneven number of teams - 13. Garbarnia was a sensation of the 1929 season, becoming the winner. However, in December 1929, after the games had been finished, PZPN changed the result of the Klub Turystow Łódź - Warta Poznań match. Originally, Łódź 's side won 2-1, however it was verified as 0-3 in favor of Warta, as reportedly, the scorer of Klub Turystow's both goals was not permitted to have appeared on the field. This controversial decision added two points to Warta and deprived Garbarnia of the championship. Also, Klub Turystow was demoted, together with 1. FC Katowice.

This is the final table:

1. Warta Poznań.

2. Garbarnia Kraków (newcomer).

3. Wisła Kraków.

4. Legia Warszawa.

5. ŁKS Łódź.

6. Cracovia.

7. Polonia Warszawa.

8. Warszawianka Warszawa.

9. Pogoń Lwów.

10. Ruch Chorzów.

11. Czarni Lwów.

RELEGATED:

12. 1. FC Katowice.

13. Klub Turystow Łódź.

=== 1930 ===
After nine years, the first, historic champion of Poland, Cracovia, regained the title. Its main rival, Wisła Kraków, finished with just point less, and Legia Warszawa was third. As the League consisted of even (12) number of teams, only one team was demoted. It was LTS-G Łódź, which had spent in the League only one year.

This is the final table:

1. Cracovia.

2. Wisła Kraków.

3. Legia Warszawa.

4. Polonia Warszawa.

5. Warta Poznań.

6. Garbarnia Kraków.

7. Pogoń Lwów.

8. Ruch Chorzów.

9. Czarni Lwów.

10. ŁKS Łódź.

11. Warszawianka Warszawa.

RELEGATED:

12. LTS-G Łódź (newcomer).

== Games of the early 1930s ==
=== 1931 ===
Finally, Garbarnia Kraków won the championships, this time without any doubts. Again, Wisła Kraków finished on the second position, and once more - just a point less. Also, Legia Warszawa for another time was third, demoted was a newcomer = Lechia Lwów.

This is the final table:

1. Garbarnia Kraków.

2. Wisła Kraków.

3. Legia Warszawa.

4. Pogoń Lwów.

5. Ruch Chorzów.

6. ŁKS Łódź.

7. Warta Poznań.

8. Polonia Warszawa.

9. Cracovia.

10. Czarni Lwów.

11. Warszawianka Warszawa.

RELEGATED:

12. Lechia Lwów (newcomer).

=== 1932 ===
Cracovia again returned to the top, just ahead of another renowned team, Pogoń Lwów. Third was Warta Poznań and Polonia Warszawa was demoted. The newcomer - Strzelec Siedlce, finished on the 9th position.

This is the final table:

1. Cracovia.

2. Pogoń Lwów.

3. Warta Poznań.

4. ŁKS Łódź.

5. Legia Warszawa.

6. Wisła Kraków.

7. Ruch Chorzów.

8. Warszawianka Warszawa.

9. Strzelec Siedlce (newcomer).

10. Garbarnia Kraków.

11. Czarni Lwów.

RELEGATED

12. Polonia Warszawa.

=== 1933 ===
In this season, PZPN decided to divide the League into two groups - Eastern and Western each of them consisted of 6 teams. Interesting is the fact that in Western group there were as many as 4 teams from Kraków. For the first time the League was won by Ruch Chorzów.

Group East:

1. Pogoń Lwów.

2. Legia Warszawa.

3. ŁKS Łódź.

4. Czarni Lwów.

5. Warszawianka Warszawa.

6. Strzelec Siedlce.

Group West:

1. Cracovia.

2. Ruch Chorzów.

3. Wisła Kraków.

4. Garbarnia Kraków.

5. Warta Poznań.

6. Podgórze Kraków (newcomer).

First three teams in both groups were promoted to the Champions Group, last three went to the Relegation Group. These are the final tables:

Champions Group - final table

1. Ruch Chorzów.

2. Pogoń Lwów.

3. Wisła Kraków.

4. Cracovia

5. ŁKS Łódź.

6. Legia Warszawa.

Relegation Group - final table

1. Warszawianka Warszawa.

2. Strzelec Siedlce.

3. Warta Poznań.

4. Podgorze Kraków.

RELEGATED:

5. Czarni Lwów.

6. Garbarnia Kraków.

=== 1934 ===
The League returned to its original form, with one group, covering the whole country. Ruch Chorzów again proved its quality, winning the games, Cracovia was second. The newcomer, Polonia Warszawa, finished ninth. Second newcomer, Garbarnia Kraków, won a special tournament, thus saving its spot in the League.

This is the final table:

1. Ruch Chorzów.

2. Cracovia.

3. Wisła Kraków.

4. Garbarnia Kraków (newcomer).

5. Legia Warszawa.

6. Pogoń Lwów.

7. Warta Poznań.

8. ŁKS Łódź.

9. Polonia Warszawa (newcomer).

10. Warszawianka Warszawa.

RELEGATED:

11. Podgórze Kraków.

12. Strzelec Siedlce.

=== 1935 ===
For the third time in a row, Ruch Chorzów became the Champion. Pogoń Lwów finished second, and the newcomer, Śląsk Świętochłowice, was fifth. Sensational was relegation of one of the most renowned teams of Polish football, Cracovia.

This is the final table:

1. Ruch Chorzów.

2. Pogoń Lwów.

3. Warta Poznań.

4. Wisła Kraków.

5. Śląsk Świętochłowice (newcomer).

6. ŁKS Łódź.

7. Garbarnia Kraków.

8. Warszawianka Warszawa.

9. Legia Warszawa.

RELEGATED:

10. Cracovia.

11. Polonia Warszawa.

== Games of the late 1930s ==
=== 1936 ===
Ruch Chorzów is still dominating, again winning the League. Second was Wisła Kraków, third - Warta Poznań. The newcomer, Dąb Katowice, was eight. Starting in this year, the League shrank to ten teams and this remained until the outbreak of World War II. Relegated were Śląsk Świętochłowice and Legia Warszawa.

This is the final table:

1. Ruch Chorzów.

2. Wisła Kraków.

3. Warta Poznań.

4. Garbarnia Kraków.

5. Warszawianka Warszawa.

6. Pogoń Lwów.

7. ŁKS Łódź.

8. Dąb Katowice (newcomer).

RELEGATED:

9. Śląsk Świętochłowice.

10. Legia Warszawa.

=== 1937 ===
This year was sensational, as two newcomers became champion and vice-champion. Cracovia marked its return by winning the League, second was AKS Chorzów. Relegated were Garbarnia Kraków and Dąb Katowice.

This is the final table:

1. Cracovia (newcomer).

2. AKS Chorzów (newcomer).

3. Ruch Chorzów.

4. Warta Poznań.

5. Wisła Kraków.

6. Pogoń Lwów.

7. Warszawianka Warszawa.

8. ŁKS Łódź.

RELEGATED:

9. Garbarnia Kraków.

10. Dąb Katowice.

=== 1938 ===
This time, Ruch Chorzów returned, winning the games, ahead of Warta Poznań and Wisła Kraków. One newcomer, Śmigły Wilno, was relegated, another - Polonia Warszawa, was fourth.

This is the final table:

1. Ruch Chorzów.

2. Warta Poznań.

3. Wisła Kraków.

4. Polonia Warszawa (newcomer).

5. Pogoń Lwów.

6. AKS Chorzów.

7. Cracovia.

8. Warszawianka Warszawa.

RELEGATED:

9. ŁKS Łódź.

10. Śmigły Wilno (newcomer).

=== 1939 ===
Games of this season were not finished, due to the outbreak of World War II. On August 31, 1939, Ruch Chorzów was first, second was Wisła Kraków, with two games less. Newcomers - Garbarnia Kraków and Union Touring Łódź were respectively eight and tenth.

This is the final table:

1. Ruch Chorzów.

2. Wisła Kraków.

3. Pogoń Lwów.

4. AKS Chorzów.

5. Warta Poznań.

6. Cracovia.

7. Polonia Warszawa.

8. Garbarnia Kraków.

9. Warszawianka Warszawa.

10. Union Touring Łódź.

== See also ==
- President of Poland's Football Cup (1936 - 1939)
- Polish football in interwar period
- The first game: December 18, 1921. Hungary - Poland 1-0
- Polish Roster in World Cup Soccer France 1938
- The last game: August 27, 1939. Poland - Hungary 4-2
