= Edmund Giemsa =

Polish footballer (1912–1994)

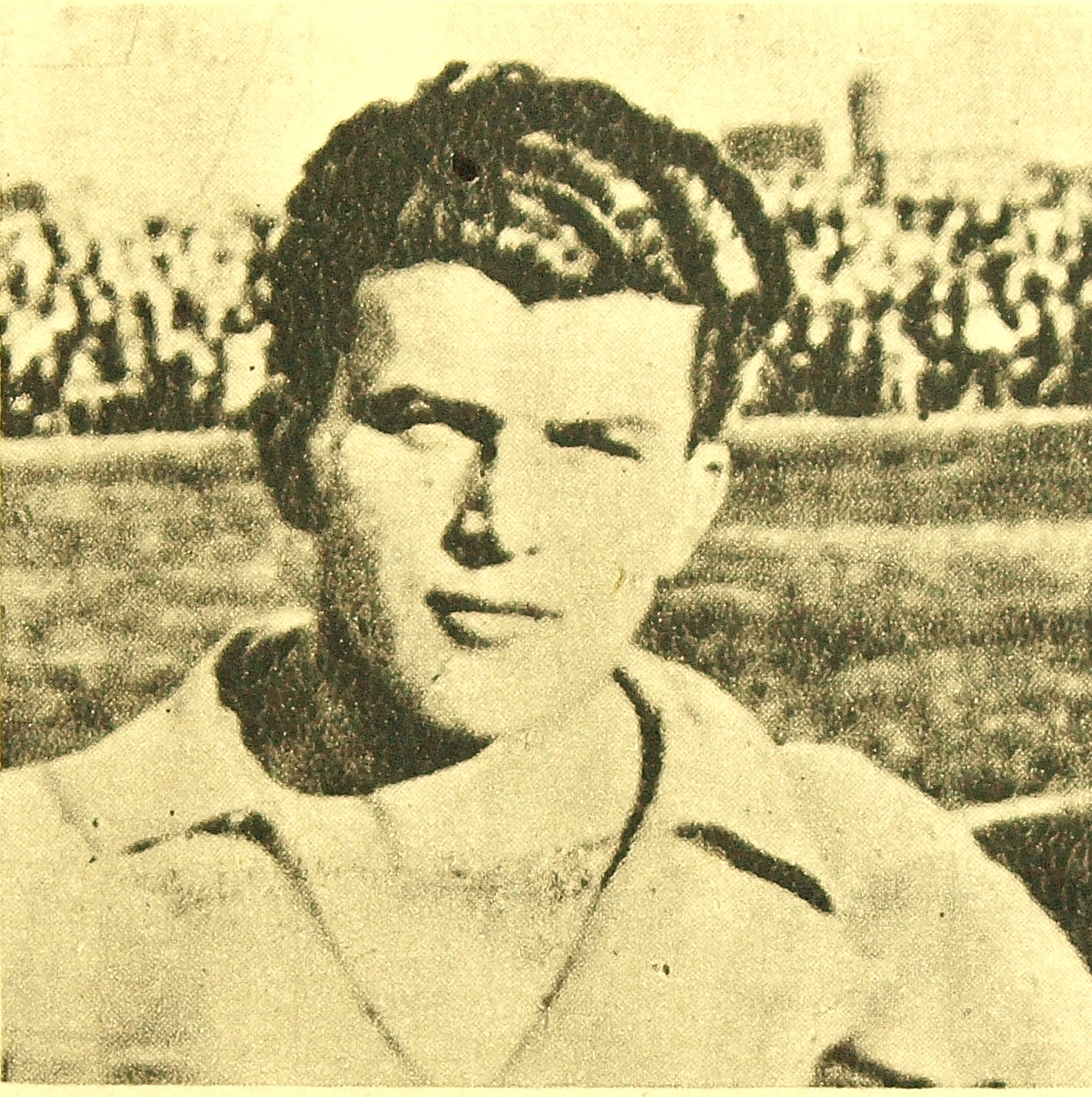

Personal information
- Full name: Edmund Giemsa
- Date of birth: 16 October 1912
- Place of birth: Ruda, German Empire
- Date of death: 30 September 1994 (aged 81)
- Place of death: Chinnor, England
- Height: 1.73 m (5 ft 8 in)
- Positions: Forward; defender

Senior career*
Years	Team	Apps	(Gls)
- Naprzód Ruda
1932–1939	Ruch Chorzów		
1939–1941	Bismarckhütter SV 99		
1944–1945	Anconitana		

International career
1933–1939	Poland	9	(0)
- * Club domestic league appearances and goals

Edmund Giemza (Giemsa) (16 October 1912 – 30 September 1994) was a Polish footballer. Initially a forward, he played as a defender in the latter stage of his career. He was born on 16 October 1912 in Upper Silesian city of Ruda Śląska and died on 30 September 1994 in Chinnor, England.

Giemsa played for Ruch Chorzów as well as the Poland national team. With Ruch, he was a multiple champion of Poland (1933, 1934, 1935, 1936, 1938).

On 4 June 1933 in Warsaw, he made his international debut in a 0–1 loss to Belgium. He was part of Poland's squad for the 1938 FIFA World Cup in France. His last game in the white-red jersey came on 27 August 1939 in Warsaw, a 4–2 win over Hungary. In total, he earned nine caps for the Poland national team.

During World War II, he was forced to join the Wehrmacht, but deserted and joined the French Resistance from where he joined the Polish Army. After the war, Giemsa decided to stay in the United Kingdom and did not return to Poland. He is a great-grandfather to Ethan Giemza and grandfather to Stefan Giemza.

== Honours ==
Ruch Chorzów

- Ekstraklasa: 1933, 1934, 1935, 1936, 1938
