= Emil Görlitz =

Polish footballer

Personal information
- Full name: Emil Antoni Görlitz
- Date of birth: 13 June 1903
- Place of birth: Katowice, Poland
- Date of death: 17 October 1990 (aged 87)
- Place of death: Altenburg, Germany
- Height: 1.82 m (6 ft 0 in)
- Positions: Goalkeeper; forward

Senior career*
Years	Team	Apps	(Gls)
1917–1924	1. FC Katowice		
1924–1925	Pogoń Lwów		
1925–1926	Edera Trieste		
1927–1934	1. FC Katowice		
1934–1937	Eintracht Altenburg		

International career
1924–1925	Poland	8	(0)
- * Club domestic league appearances and goals

Emil Antoni Görlitz (13 June 1903 – 17 October 1990) was a Polish footballer. He won eight caps for the Poland national team between 1924 and 1925.

== Honours ==
Pogoń Lwów

- Polish Football Championship: 1925
