= Teodor Peterek =

Polish footballer

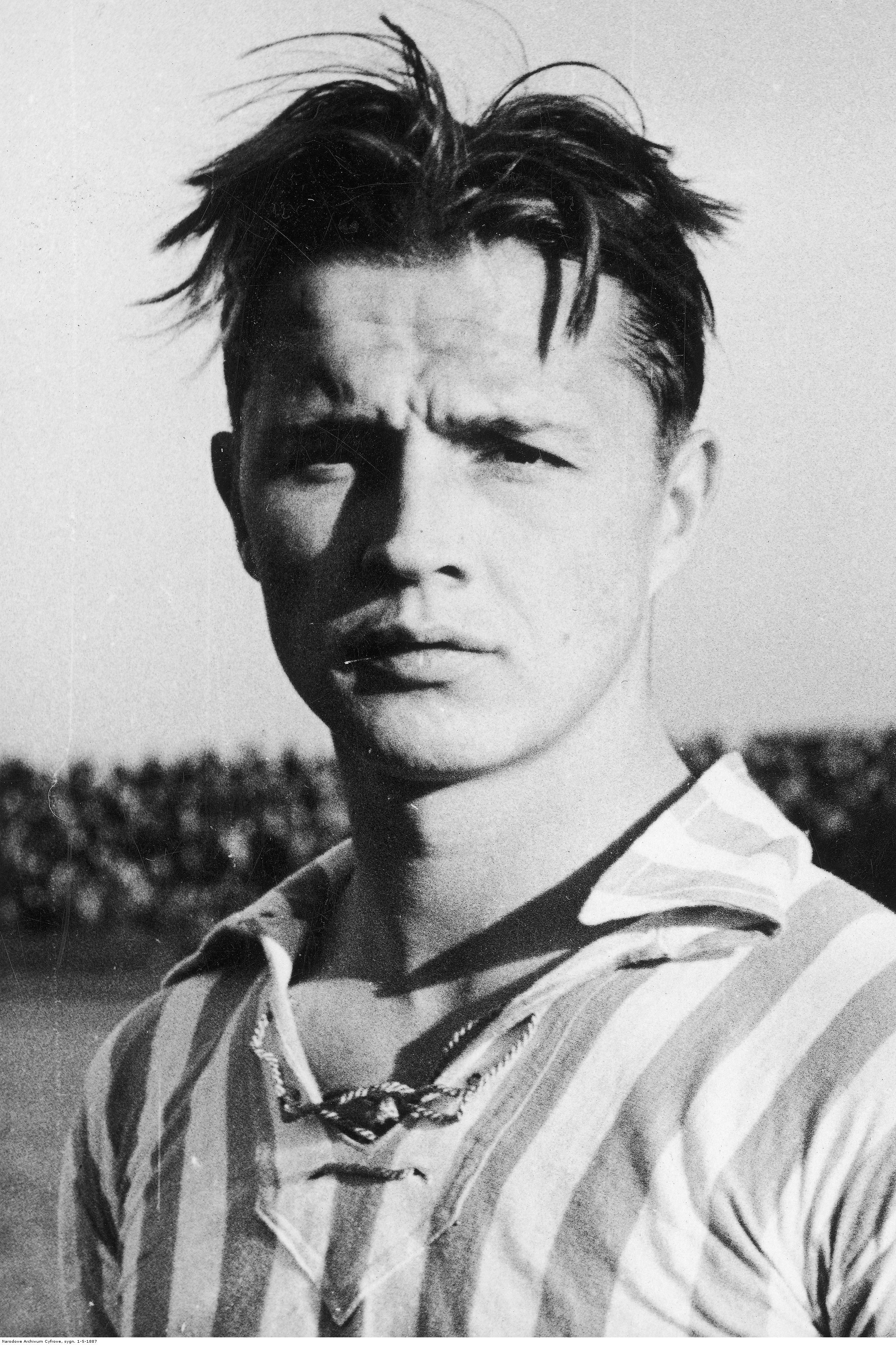
- Paterek in 1935

Personal information
- Date of birth: 7 November 1910
- Place of birth: Świętochłowice, Poland
- Date of death: 12 January 1969 (aged 58)
- Place of death: Słupiec, Poland
- Height: 1.82 m (6 ft 0 in)
- Position: Forward

Youth career
- 1925–1927: Śląsk Świętochłowice
- 1927: Ruch Chorzów

Senior career*
Years	Team	Apps	(Gls)
1928–1939	Ruch Chorzów		
1939–1941	Bismarckhütter SV		
1945–1946	St. Avon		
1947–1948	Ruch Chorzów		

International career
1931–1938	Poland	9	(6)
- * Club domestic league appearances and goals

Teodor Peterek (nicknames: Mietlorz and Teo; 7 November 1910 – 12 January 1969), was a Polish footballer who played as a forward.

== Life and career ==
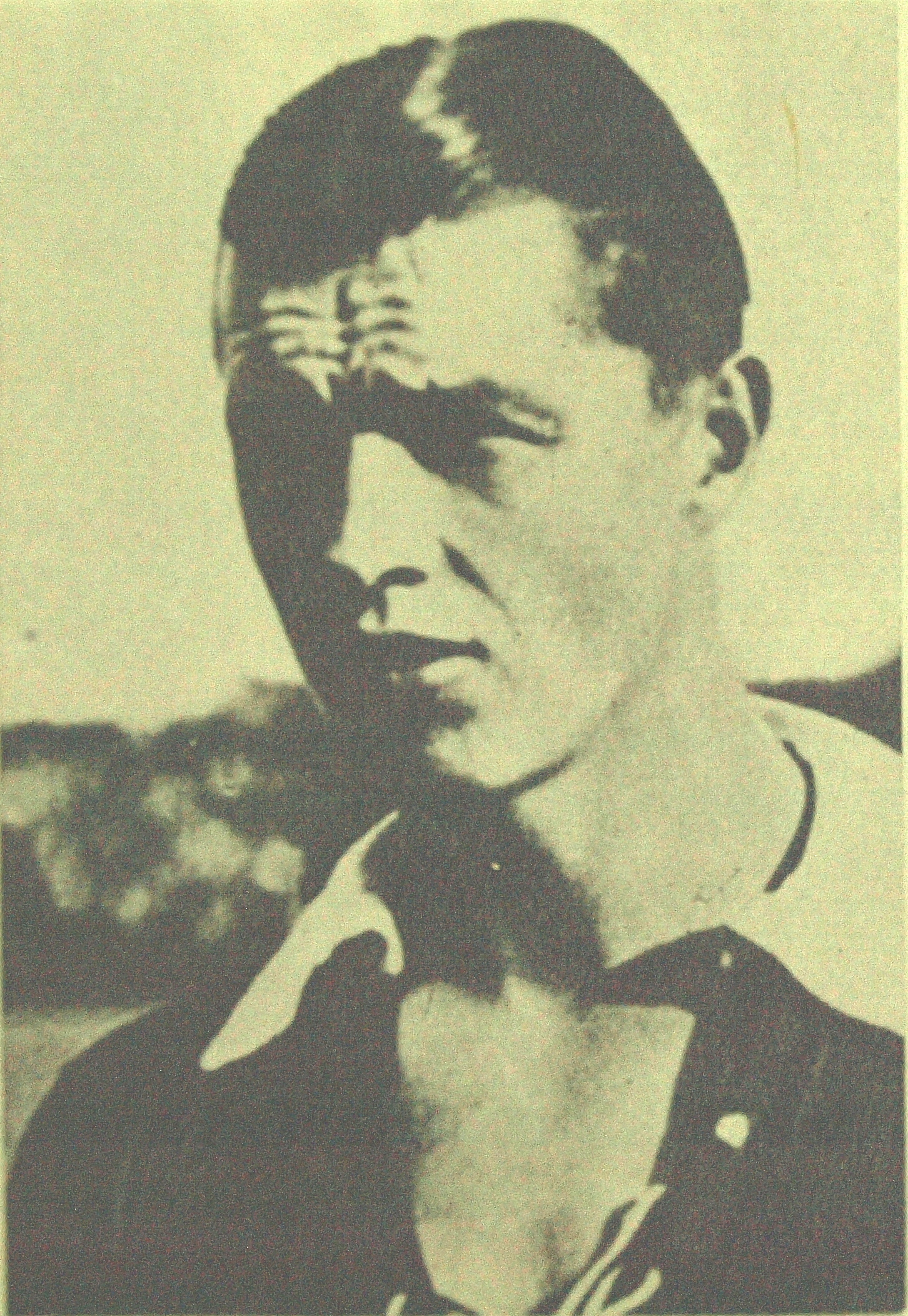
Teodor Peterek

Peterek's career started in Śląsk Świętochłowice in 1925. Two years later, he moved to Ruch Chorzów for whom he debuted at a very early age. "Teo" was not even 18 years old, when he played in a 1928 game against ŁKS Łódź. The young forward's first game for Chorzów's side was very successful - he scored a goal. He stayed in Ruch for 11 years, and won five league titles with the Silesian club. In the 1937–38 season, he scored in 16 consecutive league matches, which remained as a world record until broken by Messi in 2013.

Peterek was known for his competitive playing style. Local tradition holds that on one occasion, he threw mud at an opposing goalkeeper who had saved his penalty kick.

Together with Gerard Wodarz and Ernest Willimowski, Peterek was part of Ruch's attack, which is to this day regarded as one of the best forward formations in history of Polish Soccer League. In 189 games for Ruch (1928–1939), he scored 154 goals, a lot of them with the head - this was due to "Teo's" height - at 182 centimeters, he was one of the tallest forwards in Poland. Twice - in 1936 (together with Wilimowski - 18 goals) and in 1938 (21 goals), was the best scorer of the League.

=== World War II ===
During the Second World War, Peterek played in Bismarckhuetter Sport-Verein (1939–1941), which was in fact a pre-war Ruch Chorzów, with a German name. In 1942, Theodor (this was the German-language variation of his first name) was conscripted to the Wehrmacht, two years later escaped the German Army and was captured by the Allies, who sent him to Polish units. There, he returned to football, representing the Polish Army team in 88 friendly games.

=== After the war ===
When the war ended, he remained in France, before returning to Chorzów in 1947. In 1948, he made a few appearances for Ruch before retiring and starting a coaching career.

== International career ==
Peterek made nine appearances for the Poland national team and scored 6 goals. He made his debut on 23 August 1931 in Warsaw, in a 2–3 loss to Romania. He represented Poland at the 1936 Olympic Games in Berlin, where scored a goal. He played his last match for the national team on 18 September 1938 in Chemnitz in a 1–4 loss to Germany, scoring Poland's lone goal in the game.

== Honours ==
Ruch Chorzów

- Ekstraklasa: 1933, 1934, 1935, 1936, 1938

Individual

- Ekstraklasa top scorer: 1936, 1938
- Ekstraklasa Hall of Fame: 2024

== See also ==
- Sport in Poland
