= Wacław Kuchar =

Polish sportsman (1897–1981)

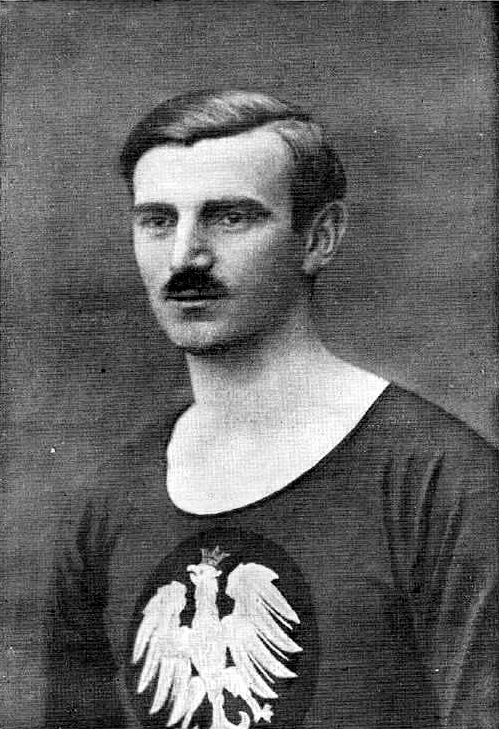

Personal information
- Full name: Wacław Michał Kuchar
- Date of birth: 16 September 1897
- Place of birth: Łańcut, Poland
- Date of death: 13 February 1981 (aged 83)
- Place of death: Warsaw, Poland
- Position: Forward

Senior career*
Years	Team	Apps	(Gls)
1912–1935	Pogoń Lwów	198	(98)
Total		198	(98)

International career
1921–1928	Poland	23	(5)

Managerial career
- 1939–1941: Dynamo Lwów
- 1944–1945: Dynamo Lwów
- 1946: Polonia Bytom
- 1947–1949: Poland
- 1949–1953: Legia Warsaw
- 1953–1957: Polonia Warsaw
- * Club domestic league appearances and goals

Wacław Michał Kuchar (16 September 1897 – 13 February 1981) was a Polish sports champion, Olympian, and multiple football, track and field and speed skating champion of the country.

Kuchar excelled in many sports: track and field, football (firstly – as a forward, then as a midfielder, and finally at the end of his career – as a defender), skiing, speed skating and ice hockey. He played for Pogoń Lwów – one of the most important and most popular sports clubs of interwar Poland. After finishing his career, he became a referee, coach and sports official.

In 1926, in a poll held by the Polish sports daily Przegląd Sportowy, Kuchar was chosen as the athlete of the year. A year later he came in 10th in the same poll. In 1924, at the Paris Olympic Games, he played on the Poland national football team.

== Club career ==
As a 15 year old, Kuchar made his debut for Pogoń Lwów, however he was never meant to play in this match. Before the game, several players fell ill, so the coach decided to play Kuchar. To the coaches surprise, Kuchar scored a hat-trick as Pogoń Lwów won 7–1 against Pogoń Stryj. When Kuchar was 16, him and his three brothers played a match against Cracovia II, winning 3–1 with Wacław scoring twice.

As a footballer representing Pogoń Lwów, Kuchar achieved these successes:

- years of career – 1912–35,
- won the Polish championship: 1922, 1923, 1925, 1926,
- top scorer of Poland: 1922 (21 goals), 1926 (11 goals),
- In 1923, he scored 88 goals in unofficial games,
- 9 goals in a match against Rewera,
- 4 goals in 5 minutes in a match against WKS Lublin,
- altogether he played in 1126 games, scoring 1065 goals.

== International career ==
Kuchar earned 23 caps for the Poland national football team, scoring 5 goals. His debut came on 18 February 1921, in a 0–1 loss to Hungary. He played his last game internationally seven years later, on 27 October 1928, appearing in a 2–3 loss to Czechoslovakia. From 1947 to 1949, he also coached the Poland national team.

== Athletics ==
Wacław Kuchar was champion of Poland in:

- 800-meter race (1920, 1921),
- 110-meter hurdle race (1920),
- 400-meter hurdle race (1923),
- high jump (1921, 1923),
- pentathlon (1923, 1924).

== Ice-skating ==
As an ice skater, Kuchar:

- participated in the European Speed Skating Championships for Men of 1925,
- 22-time Champion of Poland (Including single-distance titles) in the period 1922–29.

== Military ==
Kuchar was a captain in the Polish Army. He participated in the Polish-Ukrainian War of 1919 as well as the Polish-Soviet War of 1920; for his merits Kuchar was decorated with several medals.

== See also ==
- Pogoń Lwów
- Polish-Ukrainian War
- Polish-Soviet War
- List of famous Leopolitans
- History of football in Poland
