= Mieczysław Kasprzycki =

Polish ice hockey player

- Born: 13 December 1910; Ostrava, Austria-Hungary
- Died: 21 October 2001 (aged 90); Krynica-Zdrój, Poland
- Height: 5 ft 7 in (170 cm)
- Weight: 165 lb (75 kg; 11 st 11 lb)
- Position: Defence
- Played for: HC Vítkovice; Slavia Praha; AZS Katowice; Dąb Katowice; Cracovia; KTH Krynica
- National team: Poland
- Playing career: 1934–1939; 1946–1952

Mieczysław Kasprzycki (13 December 1910 – 21 October 2001) was a Polish ice hockey player. He played for HC Vítkovice, Slavia Praha, AZS Katowice, Dąb Katowice, Cracovia, and KTH Krynica during his career. Born in Ostrava, in what is now the Czech Republic, Kasprzycki first played hockey there and moved to Poland in 1935. He won the Polish league title five times in his career. Kasprzycki also played for the Polish national team at the 1936 and 1948 Winter Olympics, and two World Championships: in 1939 and 1947. After retiring he coached the Polish national team from 1952 until 1955, including the 1952 Winter Olympics and three World Championships.
