= Olearczyk =

Olearczyk is a Polish surname. Notable people with the surname include:

- Edward Olearczyk (1915–1994), Polish composer
- Władysław Olearczyk (1898–1970), Polish footballer
