= 1938–39 Polska Liga Hokejowa season =

Polish ice hockey season

The 1938–39 Polska Liga Hokejowa season was the 10th season of the Polska Liga Hokejowa, the top level of ice hockey in Poland. Four teams participated in the final round, and Dab Katowice won the championship. To win promotion to the final round, Warszawianka beat Czarni Lwów, Ognisko beat ŁKS Łódź, and Polonia Warszawa beat AZS Poznań.

== Qualification ==
- Dąb Katowice - KS Cracovia 2:0/1:1

== Final Tournament ==
	Club	GP	W	T	L	Goals	Pts
1.	Dąb Katowice	3	3	0	0	15:2	6
2.	KS Warszawianka	3	2	0	1	5:6	4
3.	Ognisko Wilno	3	1	0	2	4:10	2
4.	Polonia Warszawa	3	0	0	3	1:7	0
