= Stanisław Piasecki =

Polish journalist (1900–1941)

Stanisław Piasecki (15 December 1900 – 12 June 1941) was a Polish right-wing activist, politician and journalist of partially Jewish descent.

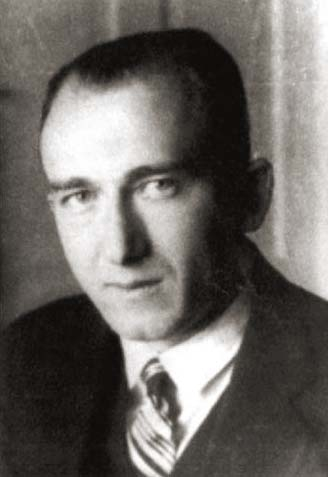
Stanisław Piasecki

Piasecki was born on 15 December 1900 in Lwów, Austrian Galicia. He was the son of scouting activist Eugeniusz Piasecki and Gizela Siberfeld, a daughter from a wealthy Jewish family, who converted to Catholic faith during the wedding and took the name Maria Piasecka He was related to the athlete Jadwiga Wajs. In his late teens, Piasecki fought in the Battle of Lemberg (1918), and the Polish-Ukrainian War. He also fought in the Polish-Soviet War of 1920–21 as a volunteer.

In the 1920s, he studied architecture at University of Jan Kazimierz in Lwow, and law at Adam Mickiewicz University in Poznań. He also was a member of the right-wing student organization Academic Union All-Polish Youth. In 1935, Piasecki founded his own literary weekly magazine, Prosto z mostu, which presented Polish right-wing publicists and writers. His ambition was to create a right-wing alternative to the liberal magazine Wiadomosci Literackie.The journal has been described as antisemitic and pro-Nazi, but by spring 1939 Piasecki begun criticizing Nazism pointing out its moral contradictions and ideological conflicts, as well as moral crisis

His Jewish background was a source of ridicule among critics, who used it to criticize or explain his antisemitic views His notable critics included Polish poet of Jewish descent, Julian Tuwim, who published a satire in the leftist magazine Szpilki attacking Piasecki and pointing out his background.

In September 1939, during the Invasion of Poland, he volunteered to the Polish Army. He was so shocked by the German atrocities that he repented his previous antisemitism Hiding from the NKVD, he returned to Warsaw and joined underground National Party. In December 1939, first issue of underground magazine Walka (Struggle) was released, with Piasecki as its editor in chief. The office of the magazine was located at Piasecki's apartment, and the money for the publication came from Arkadia Restaurant, owned by him. Tadeusz Gajcy and Witold Lutosławski were among the guests at his restaurant.

In December 1940, Piasecki was arrested by the Gestapo. After several months of tortures, he was sent to Pawiak, with his wife kept in the same complex. On 12 June 1941 Piasecki was shot near the village of Palmiry. Piasecki's mother survived the war after Eugeniusz Piasecki obtained a falsified birth certificate from a local priest.

Konstanty Ildefons Gałczyński, who coworked with Piasecki in the late 1930s, dedicated a poem to him, "Stan's Glasses" (“Okulary Staszka").

== Views on Polish Jews ==
In 1936, Piasecki endorsed the anti-Jewish violent events in Myślenice. Piasecki saw the "Jewish problem" as signification and advocated as "solution" the mass rapid emigration of Jews from Poland so that Jews would remain as 0.01 percent of the population. Piasecki continued publishing anti-Jewish texts also following the German occupation, in June 1940 he published article in the Polish National Democracy underground newspaper Walka titled "Gubernia Generalna — Paradisus Judaeorum" (The General Government — Paradisus Judaeorum) in which he stated that:

The Jews are clearly overprivileged by the German anti-Semitic racists. The armband with the Star of David has become a badge that protects them from being caught and forced to slave labour. The Jews are not kidnapped from the streets, or transported to the Reich. The Jewish Ghetto has no reason to complain about the occupation.

— Stanisław Piasecki, Walka (16 June 1940)

Because Piasecki himself was of Jewish background, his critics pointed out that the measures he supported against Jews, would mean he himself would be forced to edit only Jewish magazine in Yiddish, or even be forced to leave Poland if they would be enacted.

The German atrocities following the 1939 invasion of Poland made Piasecki reject his previous antisemitic views.

== See also ==
- Palmiry massacre
