= 1936 Ekstraklasa =

16th season of top-tier football league in Poland

Liga
- Season: 1936
- Champions: Ruch Hajduki Wielkie (4th title)
- Relegated: Śląsk Świętochłowice; Legia Warsaw
- Goals: 332
- Top goalscorer: Teodor Peterek; Ernst Wilimowski (18 goals)

Statistics of Ekstraklasa for the 1936 season.

== Overview ==
The championship was contested by 10 teams, and Ruch Hajduki Wielkie (currently Ruch Chorzów) won the title.

Season's Legia Warsaw relegation from Ekstraklasa, was its only decline from the first tier of the Polish football league system in its more than 100-year history.

== League table ==
Pos	Team	Pld	W	D	L	GF	GA	GD	Pts
1	Ruch Hajduki Wielkie (C)	18	11	2	5	50	33	+17	24
2	Wisła Kraków	18	10	2	6	30	24	+6	22
3	Warta Poznań	18	10	1	7	43	31	+12	21
4	Garbarnia Kraków	18	9	3	6	32	27	+5	21
5	Warszawianka	18	9	3	6	30	27	+3	21
6	Pogoń Lwów	18	9	1	8	36	29	+7	19
7	Łódzki KS	18	8	3	7	37	32	+5	19
8	Dąb Katowice	18	7	0	11	29	43	−14	14
9	Śląsk Świętochłowice (R)	18	4	3	11	21	40	−19	11
10	Legia Warsaw (R)	18	3	2	13	24	46	−22	8

Source: 90minut.pl (in Polish)
(C) Champions; (R) Relegated

== Results ==
Home \ Away	DĄB	GAR	LEG	ŁKS	POG	RUC	ŚWI	WAW	WAR	WIS
Dąb Katowice		0–2	2–1	3–1	3–1	3–5	2–1	3–1	2–4	0–1
Garbarnia Kraków	3–1		6–2	0–1	3–1	2–2	3–0 (Note: The match Garbarnia Kraków and Śląsk Świętochłowice was rated with 3–0 win for home team.)	0–1	1–0	2–1
Legia Warsaw	2–1	1–1		1–2	2–4	2–4	2–0	2–1	1–5	2–3
ŁKS Łódź	7–0	1–3	3–1		3–1	4–1	4–1	1–1	0–0	0–2
Pogoń Lwów	5–2	2–0	2–1	1–0		1–1	4–1	2–0	4–1	2–0
Ruch Hajduki Wielkie	2–1	6–1	6–1	6–3	2–1		5–2	3–0	0–2	1–0
Śląsk Świętochłowice	0–2	0–1	1–1	2–2	3–2	2–1		1–1	2–1	0–2
Warszawianka	1–0	4–1	2–1	1–3	3–1	2–0	3–1		4–2	1–1
Warta Poznań	1–2	2–1	2–1	5–1	2–1	3–4	2–4	5–1		2–1
Wisła Kraków	5–2	2–2	1–0	3–1	2–1	3–1	2–0	0–3	1–4	

Source: 90minut.pl (in Polish)
Legend: Blue = home team win; Yellow = draw; Red = away team win.
