= Józef Kucharski =

Polish footballer (1910–1944)

Personal information
- Date of birth: 16 April 1910
- Place of birth: Żurawica, Austria-Hungary
- Date of death: 29 October 1944 (aged 34)
- Place of death: Gilze en Rijen, Netherlands
- Height: 1.81 m (5 ft 11 in)
- Position: Defender

Senior career*
Years	Team	Apps	(Gls)
1928–1934	Pogoń Lwów	25	(1)
1935–1939	Lechia Lwów		
- * Club domestic league appearances and goals

Józef Kucharski (16 April 1910 – 29 October 1944) was a Polish footballer who played as a defender.

== Personal life ==
Kucharski served in the Invasion of Poland during the Second World War. He later fled the country and joined the Polish Armed Forces in the West, serving in the 1st Armoured Division. On 29 October 1944, he died of wounds sustained in combat in the Netherlands. He was awarded the Cross of Valour for his service.
