= Eugeniusz Piasecki =

Polish physician

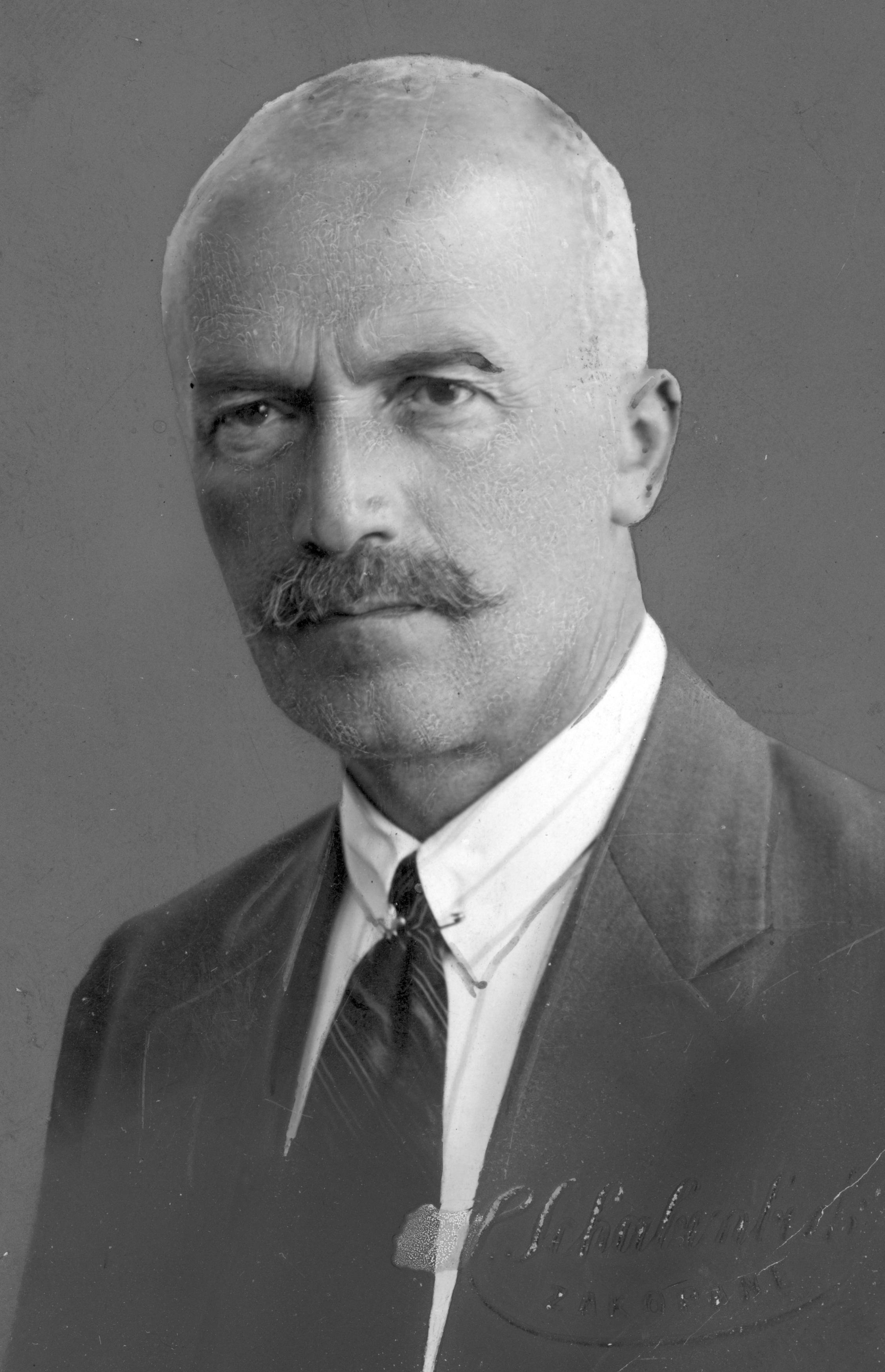
Eugeniusz Piasecki

Eugeniusz Piasecki (13 November 1872 in Lwów – 14 July 1947 in the village of Ptaszyn near Cieplice Śląskie-Zdrój) was a Polish physician, promoter of sports and hygiene and boyscouting activist.

He was the son of Wenanty Piasecki, a gym teacher at Lwów's schools and member of Gymnastic Society Sokol. Eugeniusz studied medicine at the Jagiellonian University in Kraków, and there he became familiar with ideas promoted by Henryk Jordan. In 1896, after graduation, he returned to Lwów where became a gym teacher at the local 4th high school. Soon afterwards, he founded first sports teams for students and in 1904 he opened Sports-Gymnastic Club of the 4th High School, which three years later took on the name Pogoń Lwów, becoming one of the most popular sports organizations in the history of Poland. Piasecki was the first director of the club, keeping the post until 1909, when he took up the job of a lecturer at the University of Jan Kazimierz.

In 1912 Piasecki, together with Mieczyslaw Schreiber, published one of the first Polish handbooks of scouting titled Harce mlodziezy polskiej (Games of Polish youth). He wrote that a scout should cultivate national traditions together with emphasis on physical development. Piasecki made up several terms which are until today used in Polish scouting (harcmistrz, harcerz, zastep).

During World War I he moved to Kiev, where lectured hygiene in local Polish University Collegium. In 1919 he returned to Poland and settled in Poznań, where became a professor of the Poznań University, teaching theory of physical education and school hygiene. Piasecki also was an expert diplomat, co-working with the League of Nations. He died shortly after World War II.

His son Stanisław Piasecki was a prominent pre-War Polish right-wing writer. Who was often criticized for holding antisemitic views despite being of partial Jewish descent (his mother, Gizela, being born Jewish but later converting to Catholicism when she married Eugeniusz). Stanisław Piasecki later recanted his antisemitic views before his own murder, alongside many other Polish Catholics and Jews, at the hands of the Germans. Stanisław was killed during the Palmiry massacre as part of the German AB-Aktion in 1941.

== Books ==
- Harce mlodziezy polskiej,
- Zasady Wychowania Fizycznego (1904)
- Zabawy i gry ruchowe dzieci i mlodziezy, ze zrodel dziejowych i ludoznawczych przewaznie rodzinnych i z tradycji ustnej (1916)
- Zarys teorii wychowania fizycznego (1925)
- Dzieje wychowania fizycznego (1929)

== Sources ==
- Stanislaw M. Brzozowski, Eugeniusz Piasecki, w: Polski Slownik Biograficzny, tom XXV, 1980
- Mala encyklopedia sportu, Warszawa 1987
