= Jan Wasiewicz =

Polish footballer

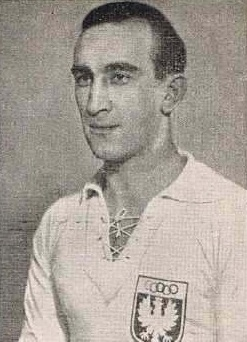

Personal information
- Full name: Jan Karol Wasiewicz
- Date of birth: 6 January 1911
- Place of birth: Lemberg, Austria-Hungary
- Date of death: 9 November 1976 (aged 65)
- Place of death: Buenos Aires, Argentina
- Height: 1.73 m (5 ft 8 in)
- Position: Midfielder

Senior career*
Years	Team	Apps	(Gls)
1926–1929	RKS Lwów		
1929–1932	Lechia Lwów	22	(0)
1933–1939	Pogoń Lwów	102	(3)
1943–1944	Hibernian		

International career
1935–1938	Poland	11	(1)
- * Club domestic league appearances and goals

Jan Karol Wasiewicz (6 January 1911 – 9 November 1976) was a Polish footballer who played as a midfielder. From 1935 to 1938, he played for the Poland national team.

His career started in 1926 in another Lwów team – RKS. In 1929, he moved to Lechia Lwów, and in 1933, to Pogoń Lwów. With them, he played in the Polish top division from 1933 to 1939, representing Pogoń in 102 games and scoring three goals. For the Poland national team, Wasiewicz took part in 11 games, scoring once. He was part of Poland's squad for the 1936 Summer Olympics. He was also a reserve team player during the 1938 FIFA World Cup, but did not go to France due to an injury.

Wasiewicz fought in the Invasion of Poland. After Poland's defeat, he escaped to Hungary. From there, he moved to France and then to England, where he fought in General Stanisław Maczek's First Polish Armoured Division. In late 1944 and early 1945, he fought in France, Belgium and Netherlands, in a famous 1st Polish Infantry Battalion "Bloody Shirts". In recognition of extraordinary service, Wasiewicz was honored with highest orders, including the Belgian Order of Léopold.

Until 1946, he served in the occupation forces in Germany. Then he moved to England, and in 1949 to Argentina, where he died.

== Sources ==
- Evans, Hilary; Gjerde, Arild; Heijmans, Jeroen; Mallon, Bill; et al. "Jan Wasiewicz". Olympics at Sports-Reference.com. Sports Reference LLC. Archived from the original on 21 October 2012.
