= Pogoń Lwów =

- Full name: Lwowski Klub Sportowy Pogoń Lwów
- Nicknames: Pogoniacze, Pogoniarze, Pogonczycy
- Founded: 1904
- Dissolved: 1945
- Ground: Marshal Edward Rydz-Śmigły Sports Park, 43 Jan Kiliński Street, Lwów
- Capacity: about 10,000
- League: Polish Football League 1927–1939
Home colours	Away colours

LKS Pogoń Lwów was a Polish professional sports club which was located in Lwów, Lwów Voivodeship (now Lviv in Ukraine), and existed from 1904 until 1945, when the city was annexed by the Soviet Union. It was the oldest Polish football club, only behind other teams from Lwów – Czarni and Lechia. With numerous departments, among them football, ice hockey and track and field, Pogoń was a major force of Polish sports in the interbellum period; its football team was never relegated from the elite Polish Football League.

On 2 July 1939, Pogoń played last pre-war official home game, drawing 1–1 with AKS Chorzów. The last pre-war game of the Pogoń's football team took place in Warsaw on 20 August 1939. Lwów's side lost 1–2 to Polonia Warsaw. The last goal was scored by the 20-year-old forward Piotr Dreher.

Due to the German, and then Soviet invasion of Poland in September 1939, football competitions in Poland were halted. The team was disbanded in 1945, after the city was annexed by the Soviet Union, and transferred to the Ukrainian SSR.

A club under the same name wishing to continue its traditions was formed in 2009.

== Honours ==
=== Football honours ===
- 4 times Polish Champions: 1922, 1923, 1925, 1926
- 3 times Polish Vice-Champions: 1932, 1933, 1935
- junior Vice-Champions of Poland: 1937 (see: Football Junior Championships of Poland)

=== Honours in other sports ===
- Ice hockey – Champion of Poland 1933 (together with Legia Warsaw), vicechampion of Poland (1929, 1930), third place in Polish championships (1927).

== History ==
=== From founding to 1914 ===
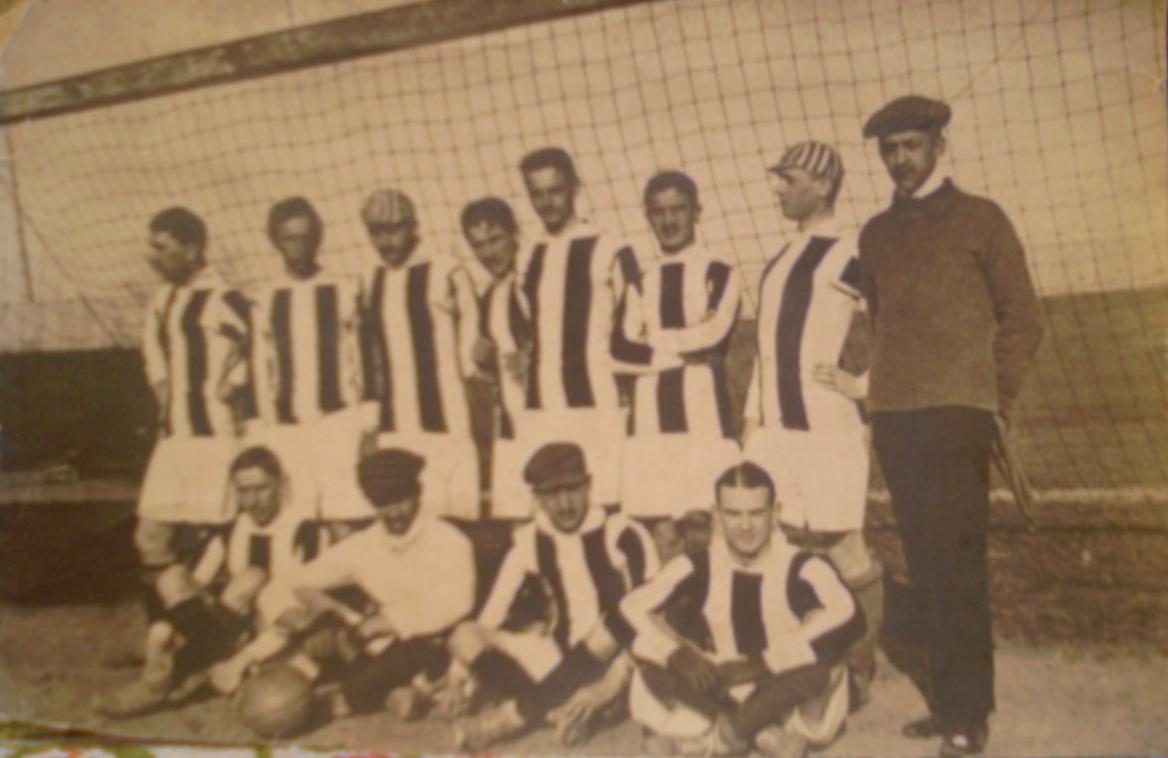
Pogoń Lwów in 1910, before the game against Lechia Lwów

The history of the club dates back to the spring of 1904, when a Sports-Gymnastics Club at Lwów's (the city, known then as Lemberg, belonged at the beginning of the 20th century to Austria-Hungary) Fourth High School was founded by a group of students, inspired by their gymnastics teacher, doctor Eugeniusz Piasecki. The organisation was based on several minor students teams, which had existed in the city since 1900, and which had played several football games with opponents from other high schools. The team of Fourth High School went together with players of Czarni Lwów in May 1906 to Kraków, where they tied with local students 1:1. The visit of Lwów's students is regarded as the event which spurred their Kraków's colleagues into founding their own teams, thus Cracovia and Wisła Kraków were created soon afterwards. In late September 1906, Kraków's team came to Lwów, beating the locals 1:0.

In 1907 the name was changed to Pogoń ("Pogoń" is Polish name of Pahonia; the new name was proposed by Maksymilian Dudryk of Lechita Lwów). The new team was a merger of the two sides – Sports-Gymnastics Club of the Fourth Gymnasium, and Lechita Lwów. Hues reflected the merger, as Sports-Gymnastics Club players wore red – blue jerseys, and Lechita's footballers white – red. Players of the new team wore white – red jerseys and blue shorts. The change accelerated the club's growth, as soon afterwards it found a rich sponsor, Ludwik Kuchar, who was the owner of several cinemas located in Lwów and Kraków. Next the statutes of Pogoń were established, based on statutes of English sports organizations. Pogoń was a co-founder of the PZPN (Polish Football Association) (1919), as well as a founding member of the Polish Football League, which started in the spring of 1927. Pogoń's first manager was doctor Eugeniusz Piasecki, who remained on this post until 1909.

During the first years of existence, Pogoń played games against other local teams, and in 1907 its lineup consisted of the following footballers: Rysiak, Marion, Kawecki, Harasymowicz, Spanring, Rzadki, Pirozynski, Kleban, Dudryk, Karasinski, Zausner. In April and May 1908, Pogoń went to Kraków, tying with Cracovia 1:1, and losing to Wisła 0:2. The first international game took place in May 1909, when Pogoń went to Košice, losing 0:5 to the champion of northern Hungary, Kassai AC. In September 1909, the Hungarians visited Lwów, winning 4:1. In 1910, Pogoń joined the Austrian Football Association, which enabled the club to make contacts with several teams of the Austrio-Hungarian Empire. In 1911, Pogoń sensationally beat 6:1 the team of Vienna. Other scores of that year were: 1:3 and 1:4 with Victoria Vienna, 3:0 and 4:2 with the Hungarian side Ungvari, 4:2 with the German team Diana Kattowitz, 2:3 and 2:3 with Budapesti FAC, 4:6 with Kassai AC, 0:4 and 1:4 with ASV Hertha Vienna, 1:5 and 1:1 with 1. Simmeringer SC.

In 1912, Pogoń went for the first time to Warsaw, where it beat 6:2 the team of the city. In the same year, Pogoń played against Budapesti FAC (2:2 and 1:0), Debreceni VSC (8:3 and 4:1), Ungvari AC (5:0), and Magyar AC (1:3 and 0:1). Among the team's players were: Steifer and Reiner (goalkeepers), Karasinski, Rzadki and Solecki (defenders), Tadeusz Kuchar, Piotrowski, Kleban, Misinski, Moeller (midfielders), Kawecki, Karol Kuchar, Bodek, Romanowski, Marion, Bedlewicz and Wladyslaw Kuchar (forwards). On May 1, 1913, a new stadium was opened with a Pogoń – Cracovia game. This match was the debut of Waclaw Kuchar. Also, in 1913, the Austrian Football Federation added Pogoń to the first class teams.

=== World War I ===
The outbreak of World War I terminated the 1914 Championships of Galicia. In the spring of 1914, Pogoń hosted two Hungarian teams – Toerekves (1:4 and 0:2), as well as Budapesti TC (0:2, 0:5). In 1915 there were no matches, and the club returned in 1916, when the city was occupied by the troops of the Russian Empire. Due to the initiative of professor Rudolf Wacek, two teams were created – the "civilians", and the "military". In the fall of that year, after the Russians had withdrawn from Lwów, Pogoń played at home against Cracovia (October 1, 0:2), and then went to Kraków, to lose 0:7.

In 1917, while the conflict was still on, Pogoń played several matches versus teams of the Austrian Army units, stationed in the city. Also, it faced Rewera Stanisławów and Vasas Budapest. The Hungarians beat the "civilians" 6:0, and the "military" 4:1. In early August 1917, the team of Vienna came to Lwów, winning one game 5:2 and losing another 1:2.

=== Golden years – 1920s ===
Immediately after World War I, a military conflict between the Poles and the Ukrainians began (see Polish–Ukrainian War), and athletes of Pogoń were unable to play any matches until well into 1919. When the hostilities had stopped, Lwów's side went on several away games across newly restored Poland, visiting Poznań, Warsaw, Łódź and Kraków. In the immediate postwar period, Pogoń's lineup consisted of Mieczyslaw Kuchar (goalkeeper), Piotrowski and Wojcicki (defenders), Fluhr, Owsionka, Kusionowicz (midfielders), Juras, Dobrzyński, Wacek Kuchar, Garbien, Batsch, Slonecki (forwards).

In June 1920, at the height of Polish–Soviet War, Pogoń went to Upper Silesia, to face German sides of that area. The tournament was a propaganda exercise, with its main purpose to show Polish-speaking Upper Silesians the strength of Polish sports. Two games were of special importance – one versus Diana Kattowitz (5:0), and another versus Beuthen 09 (3:2). After Pogoń's visit, Poles in Upper Silesia began founding their own teams.

In 1921, in the first completed games for the Championships of Poland (the 1920 games were not finished because of the war), Pogoń represented Lwów's district of the Polish Football Association. However, in the final tournament, Lwów's team was placed in the last (fourth) position, after the champions (Cracovia), Polonia Warsaw, and Warta Poznań.

1922 was the beginning of the golden era of Pogoń's football team. It was then that Lwów's side won the first Polish championship, owing not only to a score of talented players, but also to Austrian coach named K. Fischer, who preferred an offensive, modern style of play. In the first stage, which was regional competition, Pogoń beat all opponents without losing a point. Next, in the finals of Southern Poland, Lwów's favourites twice beat Ruch Chorzów (12:0, 6:0), and WKS Lublin (11:0 and 4:0). The toughest nut to crack was the 1921 champion, Cracovia Kraków. At home, Pogoń won 3:2, but in Kraków, lost 1:4. Nevertheless, the Leopolitans were first, due to better overall goal difference. In the final stage, Pogoń faced the champions of Northern Poland, Warta Poznań. In Poznań, the game ended in a 1:1 draw, and in Lwów the home team won 4:3, thus becoming the 1922 Champions.

In 1923, Pogoń again became the champions of Lwów's district of the Polish Football Association, winning 9 games and drawing 1 (with the record victory 21:1 versus Rewera Stanisławów). Then, in the Eastern Poland group of the Championship it won all games, routing Lauda Wilno 13:0, and WKS Lublin 8:0 and 7:0. The final games against the champions of Western Poland Wisła Kraków, ended in a tie; in Lwów Pogoń won 3:0, and in Kraków, Wisla was better, winning 2:1. Therefore, a third match was necessary, in Warsaw. Pogoń won in extra time 2:1. In the summer of that year, Pogoń went to Yugoslavia, but without major successes. The Leopolitans lost to Concordia Zagreb 2:3, and HASK Zagreb 0:1. In Belgrade, Pogoń won one game and lost another 0:4, to SK Jugoslavija. Furthermore, a number of foreign teams visited Lwów – VfB Admira Wacker Mödling (4:6 and 3:3), Eintracht Leipzig (7:1), Kispest AC (1:1 and 2:2), WAF Vienna (3:1 and 2:1), and Hakoah Vienna (2:1).

In 1924, due to the Olympic Games in Paris, the championships of Poland were not played. Therefore, Pogoń had a lot of time for numeral friendly games, both with Polish and foreign opponents. Altogether, the club played 55 matches, including 24 with teams from other countries. Among others, it beat the 1922 champion of Denmark, Kjøbenhavns Boldklub (3:1), twice beat HAŠK Zagreb (4:2 and 2:1), and twice lost to the champion of Austria, SV Amateure (0:1, 0:2).

Pogoń was at the height of its form in the 1925 football season. For nine months of that year, the Leopolitans did not lose a single game to a Polish opponent, finally conceding an away game vs. Polonia Warsaw on September 13. The club purchased a very talented goalkeeper from Katowice, Emil Goerlitz, who also represented the national team of the country. Apart from winning the Polish championships, Pogoń played against teams as Hakoah Vienna (2:1, 0:2), WAC Vienna (4:0 and 1:3), SV Amateure (3:1, 2:2), Simmering (0:2, 2:4), and Sparta Prague. The lineup consisted of Gorlitz (goalkeeper), Olearczyk and Giebartowski (defenders), Hanke, Fichtel, Gulicz (midfielders), Slonecki, Batsch, W. Kuchar, Grabien and Szabakiewicz (forwards).

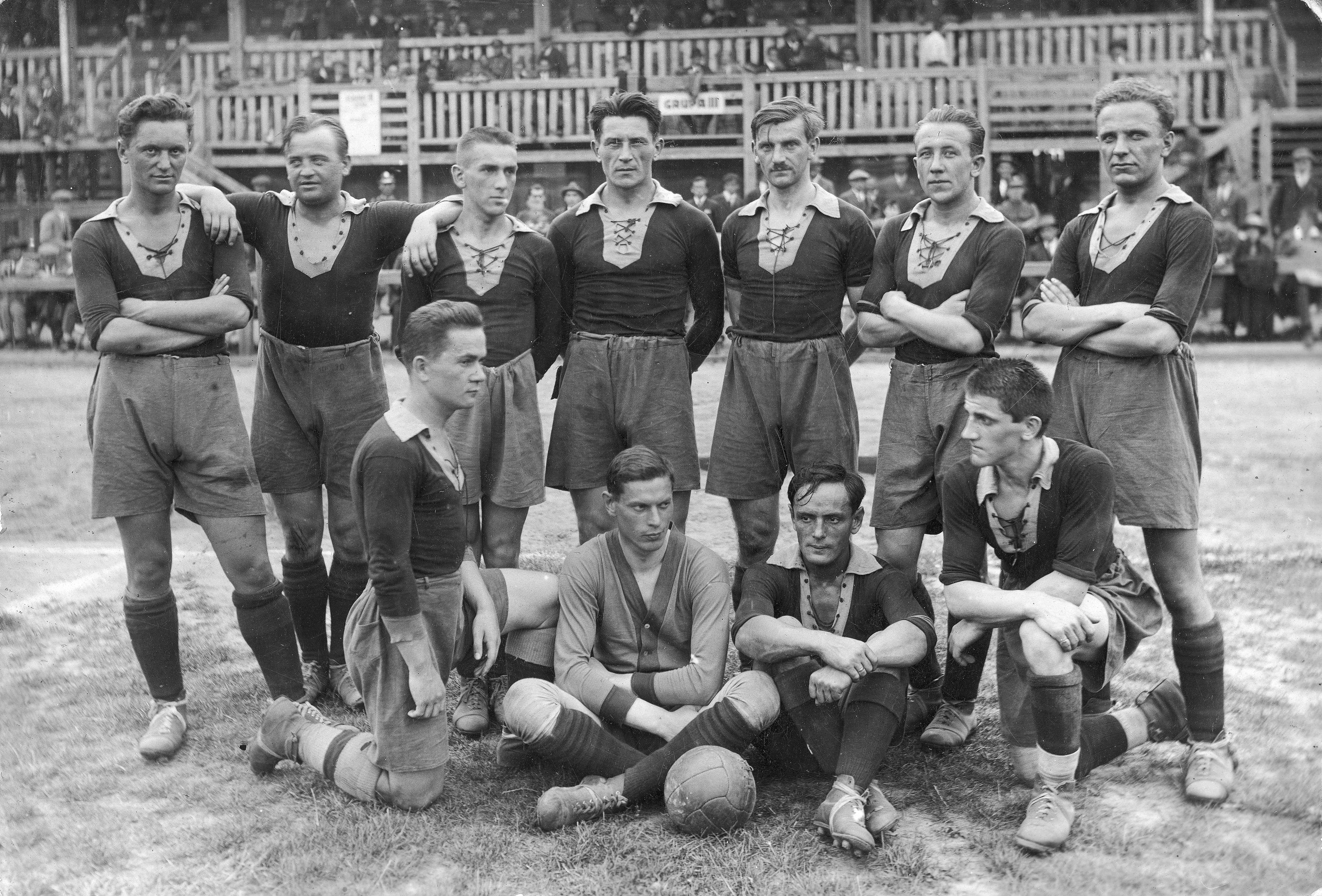
Pogoń Lwów in 1926

After the successes of 1925, Pogoń found itself in severe financial trouble, and the following year, the club was unable to contract any games with foreign opponents. Thus, the team could not afford to play any games with foreign opponents and limited itself to facing Polish sides. For the fourth time in a row, Pogoń turned out to be the best Polish team, beating on the way to championship Cracovia Kraków, WKS/Lublinianka Lublin, Warta Poznań (2:2, 7:1), and Polonia Warsaw (2:2, 2:0). The 1926 success was the last championship for the club, and the winners fielded such players, as Lachowicz (goalkeeper), Olearczyk, Giebartowski (defenders), Deutschman, Fichtel, Hanke (midfielders), Urlich, Batsch, W. Kuchar, Grabien, Szabakiewicz (forwards). Top stars were three forwards – Kuchar, Batsch and Grabien, who altogether in 4 years scored 284 goals – Kuchar 125, Batsch 96, and Grabien 63.

In 1927 the championship of Poland was reorganized with creation of the Football League. Pogoń, as its founder and champion of the country, was automatically added to the League. In the first year, Lwów's side finished games on the 4th position. It must be mentioned that Pogoń was stripped of 6 points, because it played a friendly game with Cracovia – the team that was banned by the League. As the League was very time-consuming, Pogoń played only one international friendly, beating the Romanian side Fulgerul Bucharest 4:2 at home . In goal, a young, talented keeper Spirydion Albański appeared. The 1928 season was average, with Pogoń finishing on the 6th spot. In the two international friendlies, the Leopolians lost to Čechie Karlín 1:3, and to Vasas Budapest 0:2. The 1929 season was even worse – Lwów's side was placed on the 9th position.

=== 1930s ===
In 1930, the team of Pogoń was far from its glorious past, completing the season on the distant, 7th position. The lineup consisted of a generation of young players (Albanski, Jezewski, Deutschman, Nahaczewski, Maurer, Michal Matyas, Adolf Zimmer), who were supported by veterans – Waclaw Kuchar, Hanke, or Szabakiewicz. In international friendlies, Pogoń beat 3:0 Jahn Czernowitz, ethnic German side from Cernauti, and lost to III Kerulet FC 3:5, 1:2, as well as Atilla Miskolc 1:3. The 1931 season marked resurgence of form. After purchasing Karol Kossok from Cracovia and Edmund Majowski from AKS Chorzów, Pogoń finished on the 4th spot, only two points behind the champion, Garbarnia Kraków. In this year's lone international game, the Leopolians beat Hakkoah Vienna 1:0. Next year was even better, with Pogoń finishing on the second position, one point behind the champion, Cracovia. The lineup consisted of the following players: Albanski, Jezewski, Kucharski, Hanin, W. Kuchar, Deutschman, Niechciol, Nachaczewski, Schlaff, Matyas II, Zimmer, Matyas I. In 1932, veteran forward Waclaw Kuchar celebrated the 20th anniversary of active playing. Pogoń played twice versus Hungarians of Attila Miskolc, losing 2:4, and winning 1:0.

In the 1933 season, Pogoń was once again very close to winning the championship, ending in the second position. In that year, Waclaw Kuchar finished career, and was replaced by a very talented midfielder Jan Wasiewicz. In international games, Pogoń beat 3:0 Standard Liège, twice played the Czech team Sparta Kosire (1:5, 5:2), beat Hakoah Vienna 2:0, and tied with Hakoah Cernauti 2:2.

In 1934 Pogoń saw a decline in form, finishing on the sixth position. One of the reasons for the drop in performance was a severe injury of its top scorer, Michal Matyas. In spring of that year, however, the Leopolians went on a tournee to Belgium and France. They lost to Olympique Lille 0:1, beat the top Belgian team R. Daring Club Molenbeek 2:1 and lost to RFC Liège 0:1. In the fall of 1934, Pogoń hosted in Lwów the renowned team of A.C. Milan, beating the Italians 5:3. At the end of the season, the Leopolians twice lost to Brocskay Debrecen 0:2 and 1:2.

1935 was a better year, as Pogoń for the third time finished the Ekstraklasa games on the second position. Michal Matyas returned after the injury, and proved his quality, scoring 22 goals (out of total 55 Pogoń's league scores), which made him the top scorer of the country. In international friendlies, the Leopolians twice played against FC Seged (1:1, 0:1), lost 2:7 to Wiener AC and 0:2 to Admira Wacker Vienna and finally lost and drew against Hakoah Vienna (0:1 and 2:2). In the late fall of 1935, the second-best team of Poland went to Vienna, but the trip was a disaster. Pogoń was twice routed, losing 3:13 to Admira and 2:9 to Rapid.

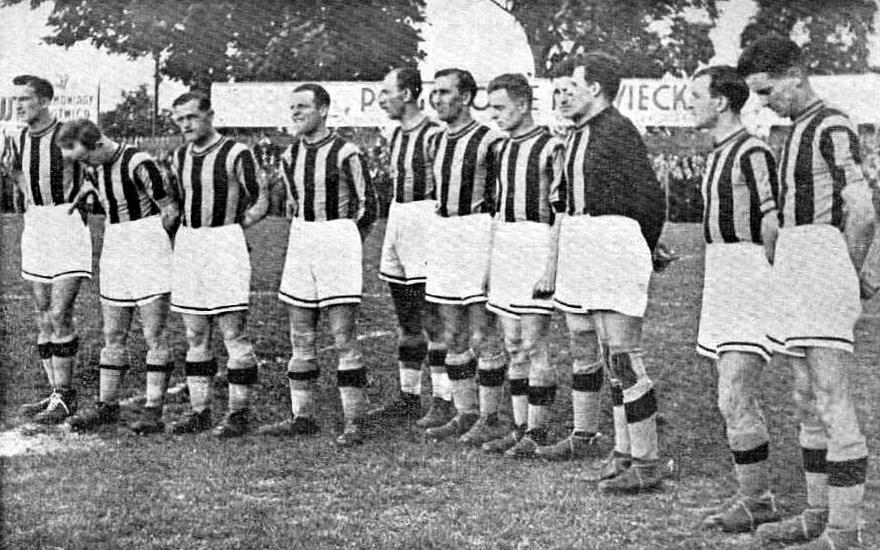
Pogoń Lwów in 1936

In 1936, a generation of young, talented players appeared in Lwów, with Adam Wolanin and Stanislaw Szmyd. The team finished Ekstraklasa games on the 6th position, and in summer of that year, Pogoń hosted the champion of Bulgaria, Levski Sofia, winning 1:0. A number of games against Austrian teams again ended in a disaster – Pogoń lost 5 matches and won only one.

The 1937 season was one of the worst in Pogoń's history. After the spring round (back then, Polish league played in a spring – autumn system), the Leopolians were on the last position, with only 4 points. During the summer break, Pogoń went on a training camp to Troki, and after the camp, the team returned to form, winning several games, which elevated it to the 6th position. Among the victories, the most notable was beating of AKS Chorzów 1:0 in Chorzów. This result allowed Cracovia to become champion of Poland. In 1937, Pogoń played several international friendlies, including two games with exotic side Hapoel Tel Aviv (both won 4:2 and 7:2).

In 1938, the last completed pre-war season of the Ekstraklasa, Pogoń ended in the 5th position. That year the club played only three international games – against Budafok 1:1 and twice against Kispesti 0:2, 0:1. Altogether, during 35 years of existence, the Leopolians played 955 games, out of which 557 were victories, 263 loses and 135 draws.

=== During the Second World War ===
Following the German invasion of Poland on 1 September 1939, which started World War II in September 1939, football competitions in Poland were suspended. Then on 17 September 1939, the Soviet Union invaded Poland under the terms of the Molotov-Ribbentrop pact, and Lwów was occupied by the Soviet Union.

Two pre-war footballers, Alfred Zimmer and Tadeusz Kowalski, and athlete Karol Cybulski were among Poles murdered by the Russians in the large Katyn massacre in April–May 1940.

=== Dissolution ===
After the war, when it became clear that Lwów would no longer belong to Poland and instead become part of the Soviet Union under the Ukrainian SSR and be renamed Lvov in Russian or Lviv in Ukrainian, its Polish inhabitants were expelled from the city and the entire Kresy region, which was annexed by the USSR and incorporated into the Ukrainian, Belarusian and Lithuanian SSR. Most of the expelled Poles were resettled in areas previously inhabited by Germans and formerly part of Germany, who were expelled from areas east of the Oder-Neisse line.

Due to that scenario, the team became extinct. Pogoń's former officials as well as its players, who wanted to continue their sports activities, helped with founding of several sports clubs. Among clubs that can be regarded as Pogoń's continuation, there are: Polonia Bytom, Odra Opole, Piast Gliwice and Pogoń Szczecin. All these teams have the same hues as Pogon, and similar logos. Odra Opole was originally called Lwowianka, but the name was disliked by Communist authorities and had to be changed some time in late 1940s.

In April 2009, the club was re-founded under the same name and crest.

== Departments ==
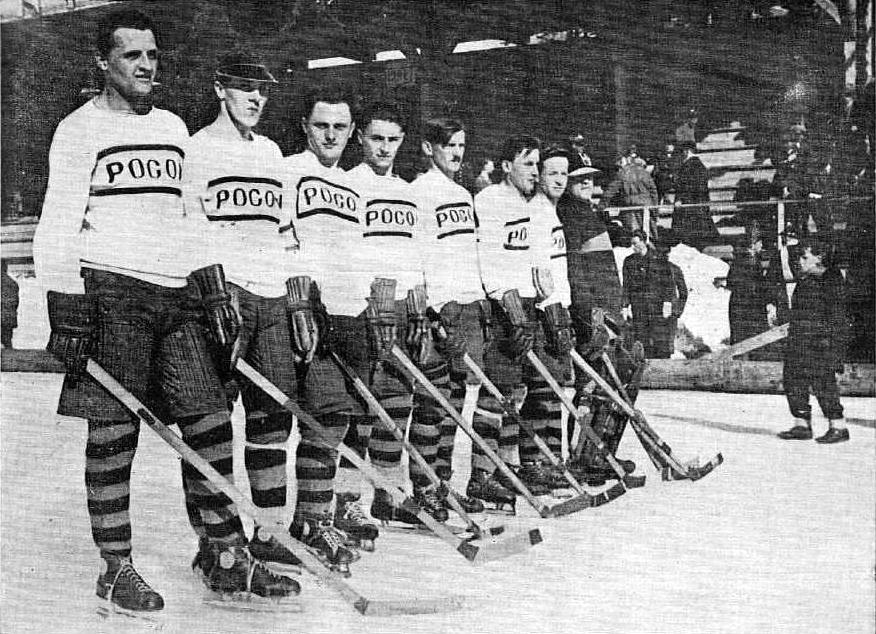
Ice hockey team, 1930

- Football, founded in 1904. According to the January 1939 press release of the Polish Football Association, in the year 1938 Pogoń had five different football teams, with 219 registered players (including 68 youth teams footballers),
- Track and field, founded in 1907
- Watersports, founded in 1908
- Wintersports, founded in 1908 (Later on, ice-hockey, skating and skiing departments were created out of it.)
- Tennis, founded in 1909
- Cycling, founded in 1909
- Wrestling, founded in 1910
- Handball, founded in 1910
- Boxing, founded in 1926
- Fencing, founded in 1927
- Table-tennis, founded in 1930
- Archery, founded in 1932
- Kayaking, founded in 1933
- Shooting, founded in 1934

== Pogoń's football team in interwar Poland ==
1920–1926 non-league championships – the winners of regional leagues played against each other in the finals

- 1920 – Championship not finished due to Polish–Soviet War
- 1921 – 4th in the finals, behind Cracovia, Polonia Warsaw and Warta Poznań, but ahead of ŁKS Łódź. To get to the finals, Pogoń had won regional games of the Lwów area.
- 1922 – Champions, after beating the champions of Northern Poland, Warta Poznań (1–1 and 4–3). Before the final games, Pogoń had become the champion of Southern Poland, beating Cracovia Kraków 3–2 and 1–4, Lublinianka Lublin 4–0 and 11–0 and Ruch Chorzów 12–0 and 6–0.
- 1923 – Champions, after beating the champions of Western Poland, Wisła Kraków. In the first leg in Lwów, Pogoń won 3–0. In the second leg, in Kraków, Wisła won 2–1 and the third game was necessary, in Warsaw, which Pogoń won 2–1 (1–0). Before the final games, Pogoń had become the champion of Eastern Poland, beating Polonia Warsaw 5–1 and 6–1, WKS Lublin 8–0 and 7–0 and Lauda Wilno 13–0 and 3–1.
- 1924 – No competition because of the 1924 Olympic Games in Paris.
- 1925 – Champions, after beating in the finals Warta Poznań (4–1 and 2–2) and Wisła Kraków (1–0 and 1–0).
- 1926 – Champions, after beating in the finals Warta Poznań (7–1 and 2–2) and Polonia Warsaw (1–0, 2–2 and 2–0).

1927–1939 Polish Football League

- 1927 – 4th, with 29 points, goals 65–42
- 1928 – 6th, with 31 points, goals 61–55
- 1929 – 9th, with 19 points, goals 43–48
- 1930 – 7th, with 19 points, goals 34–36
- 1931 – 4th, with 28 points, goals 47–33
- 1932 – 2nd, with 28 points, goals 32–24
- 1933 – 2nd in the champions group, with 13 points, goals 29–16
- 1934 – 6th, with 24 points, goals 41–38
- 1935 – 2nd, with 25 points, goals 55–31
- 1936 – 6th, with 19 points, goals 36–29
- 1937 – 6th, with 19 points, goals 25–23
- 1938 – 5th, with 19 points, goals 23–26
- 1939 – The season was not finished due to the outbreak of the Second World War. At the end of August 1939, Pogoń was 3rd in the league, with 16 points and goals 27–22.

=== League and Cup history ===
Season	Div.	Pos.	Pl.	W	D	L	GS	GA	P	Domestic Cup	Europe	Notes
1921	1st	4	8	3	0	5	19	13	6			
1922	1st	1	6	5	0	1	37	8	10			Championship final vs Warta Poznań 4:3, 1:1
1923	1st	1	6	6	0	0	42	3	12			Championship final vs Wisła Kraków 3:0, 1:2, 2:1
1924	1st											Competition did not take place
1925	1st	1	4	3	1	0	8	3	7			Won qualification group with record +4=0–0, 12–1 against Pogoń Wilno and Lublinianka Lublin
1926	1st	1	4	2	2	0	13	5	6	void		Won qualification group with record +4=0–0, 24–2 against Cracovia and Lublinianka Lublin
1927	1st	4	26	13	3	10	85	42	29			First real league competition
1928	1st	6	28	14	3	11	61	55	31			
1929	1st	9	24	7	5	12	43	48	19			
1930	1st	7	22	4	11	7	34	36	19			
1931	1st	4	22	11	6	5	47	33	29			
1932	1st	2	22	13	2	7	32	24	28			
1933	1st	2	10	6	1	3	29	16	13			Won the Eastern Group of six
1934	1st	6	22	12	0	10	41	38	24			
1935	1st	2	20	11	3	6	55	31	25			
1936	1st	6	18	9	1	8	36	29	19			
1937	1st	6	16	6	3	7	19	23	15			
1938	1st	5	18	9	1	8	23	26	19			
1939	1st	3	13	7	2	4	27	22	16			Did not finish due to World War II

Note: There was really no cup competition in early seasons. The initially started in 1926 the competition was discontinued for about 40(!) years. In 1936 through 1939 there was the Polish President Cup, where the best players from each regions competed. However, it really was not until 1938 right before the war when the Ekstraklasa players participated in that Cup. The united Lwów team of 1938 consisting mostly out of Pogoń Lwów players managed to overcome the united Kraków team (consisting of Wisła Kraków) in the finals and winning the competition.

== Chairmen ==
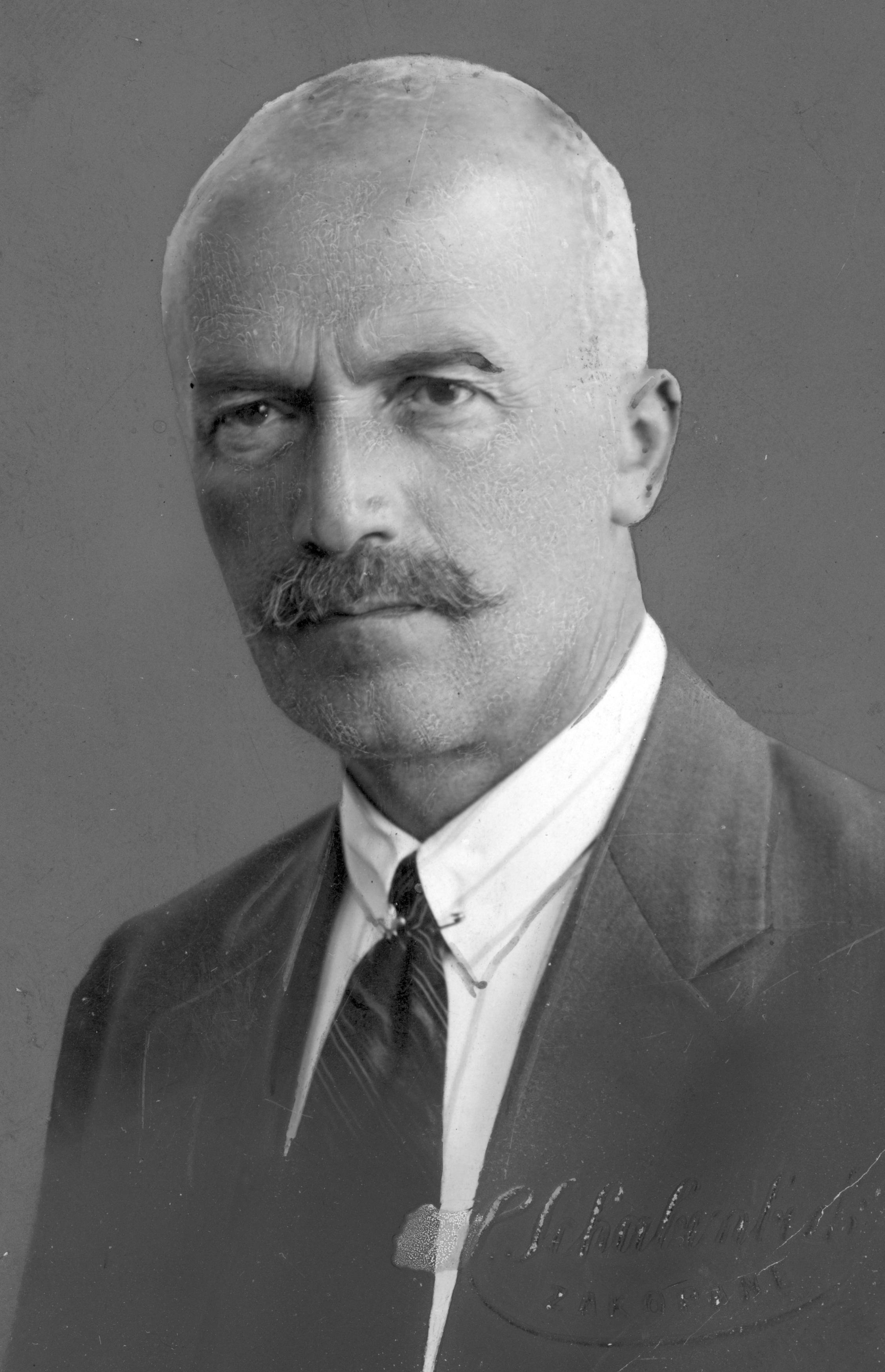
Eugeniusz Piasecki, first chairman of Pogoń Lwów

- 1907–1909 prof. Eugeniusz Piasecki
- 1910 dr. Jan Lubicz-Woytkowski
- 1910–1914 dr. Stanislaw Miziewicz
- 1914–1921 prof. Rudolf Wacek
- 1921–1923 Ludwik Koziebrodzki
- 1924 Tadeusz Kuchar
- 1925 Michal Parylak
- 1926–1932 dr. Wlodzimierz Dzieduszyński
- 1933–1934 colonel Ludwik Lepiarz
- 1935 dr. Romuald Klimow
- 1936 Kazimierz Protassowicz
- 1937–1938 Eugeniusz Ślepecki
- 1938–1939 dr. Jerzy Kozicki

== See also ==
- Karpaty Lviv, now representing the city in Ukrainian football
- History of football in Poland
- Lechia Lwów
- Czarni Lwów
- Hasmonea Lwów
- Sparta Lwów
- Sports in Poland
- Polonia Bytom
- Pogoń Szczecin
- Wacław Kuchar
- Polish soccer (football) in interwar period
- Polish Football League (1927–1939)

== Sources ==
- History of sports in Lwow
- Final tables of Polish football leagues
