= 1922 Polish Football Championship =

3rd season of top-tier football league in Poland

Polish Football Championship
- Season: 1922
- Dates: 29 July 1922 – 22 October 1922
- Champions: Pogoń Lwów (1st title)
- Matches: 26
- Goals: 154 (5.92 per match)
- Top goalscorer: Wacław Kuchar (21 goals)
- Biggest home win: Pogoń 12–0 Ruch
- Biggest away win: Ruch 0–7 Cracovia (30 July 1922)
- Highest scoring: Pogoń 12–0 Ruch
- Highest attendance: 10,000; Cracovia 4–1 Pogoń (10 September 1922)

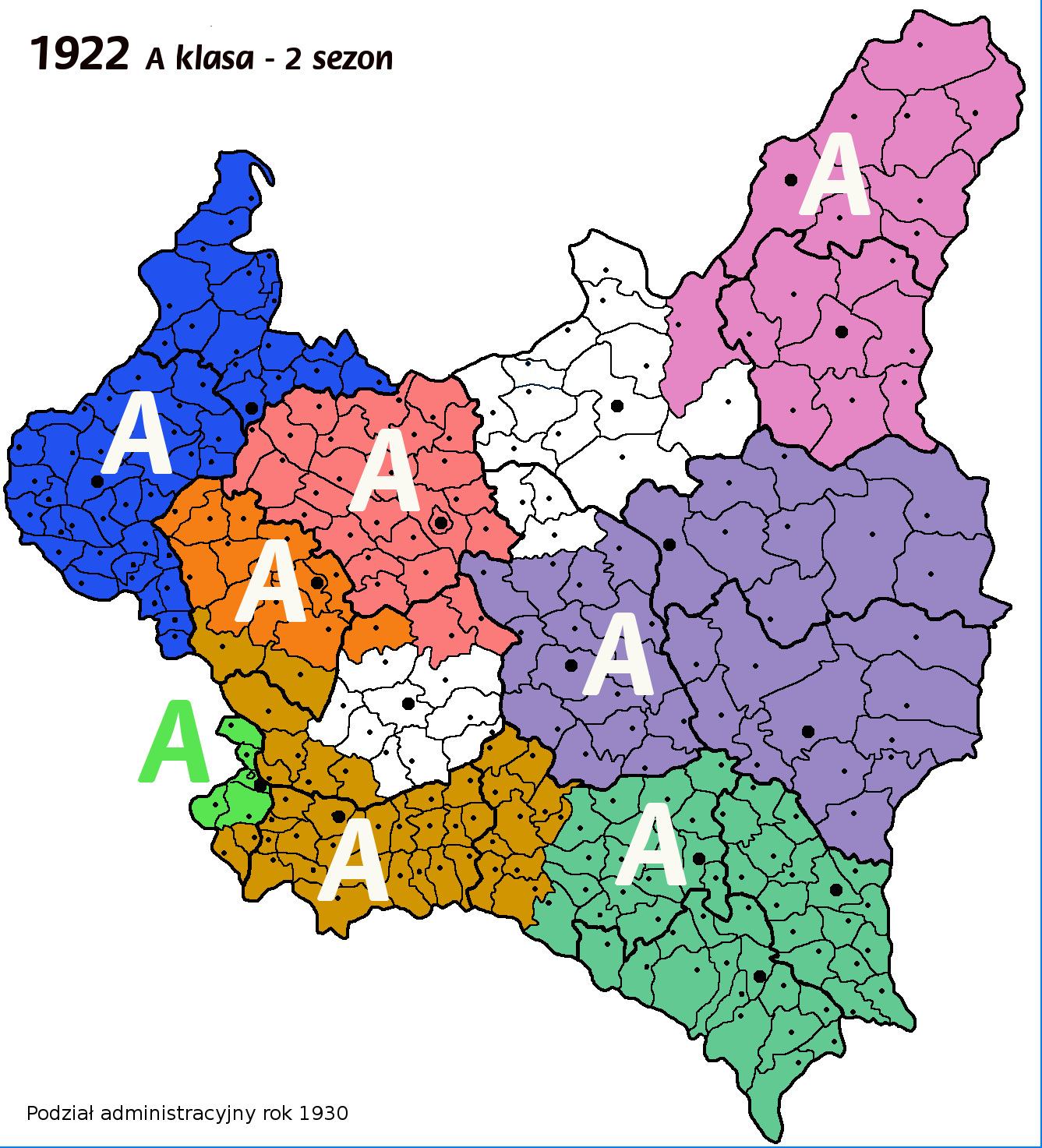
Eight regional A-Classes, whose winners competed in the national championship.

1922 Polish Football Championship was the 3rd edition of the Polish Football Championship (Non-League) and 2nd completed season ended with the selection of a winner. The championship was decided in final tournament played among eight teams (winners of the regional A-Class championship) participated in the league which was divided into 2 groups: a Northern and a Southern one. The winners of both groups, Warta Poznań and Pogoń Lwów, played a 2 leg final match for the title. The champions were Pogoń Lwów, who won their 1st Polish title.

== Competition modus ==
The final tournaments started on 29 July 1922 and concluded on 22 October 1922 (spring-autumn system). In each of groups the season was played as a round-robin tournament. A total of 8 teams participated. Each team played a total of 6 matches, half at home and half away, two games against each other team. Teams received two points for a win and one point for a draw. The winners of both groups played a 2 leg final match for the title.

== Final tournament tables ==
=== Northern Group ===
Pos	Team	Pld	W	D	L	GF	GA	GD	Pts
1	Warta Poznań ↑	6	6	0	0	33	6	+27	12
2	ŁKS Łódź	6	3	0	3	17	9	+8	6
3	Polonia Warsaw	6	2	0	4	13	14	−1	4
4	Strzelec Wilno	6	1	0	5	9	33	−24	2

Source: rsssf.com

=== Southern Group ===
Pos	Team	Pld	W	D	L	GF	GA	GD	Pts
1	Pogoń Lwów ↑	6	5	0	1	37	8	+29	10
2	Cracovia	6	5	0	1	34	7	+27	10
3	WKS Lublin	6	1	0	5	6	32	−26	2
4	Ruch Hajduki Wielkie	6	1	0	5	8	38	−30	2

Source: rsssf.com

=== Final matches ===
Team 1	Agg.	Team 2	1st leg	2nd leg
Pogoń Lwów	5–4	Warta Poznań	1–1 in Poznań	4–3 in Lwów

== Top goalscorers ==
Rank	Player	Club	Goals
1	(Poland) Wacław Kuchar	Pogoń Lwów	21
2	(Poland) Mieczysław Batsch	Pogoń Lwów	14
3	(Poland) Wawrzyniec Staliński	Warta Poznań	12

== Bibliography ==
- Gowarzewski, Andrzej (2000). Encyklopedia Piłkarska Fuji. Liga Polska. O tytuł mistrza Polski 1920–2000 (in Polish). GiA, Katowice. ISBN 83-88232-02-9.
- Gowarzewski, Andrzej (1994). Encyklopedia Piłkarska Fuji. 75 lat PZPN. Księga jubileuszowa (in Polish). GiA, Katowice. ISBN 83-902751-1-2.
- Gowarzewski, Andrzej (2000). Encyklopedia Piłkarska Fuji. Album 80 lat PZPN (in Polish). GiA, Katowice.
- Gowarzewski, Andrzej (2010). Encyklopedia Piłkarska Fuji. Album 90 lat PZPN (in Polish). GiA, Katowice.
