= Spirydion Albański =

Polish footballer (1907–1992)

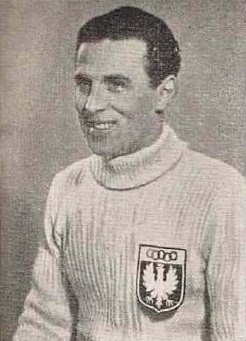

Personal information
- Full name: Spirydion Jan Albański
- Date of birth: 4 October 1907
- Place of birth: Lemberg, Austria-Hungary
- Date of death: 30 March 1992 (aged 84)
- Place of death: Katowice, Poland
- Height: 1.76 m (5 ft 9 1/2 in)
- Position: Goalkeeper

Senior career*
Years	Team	Apps	(Gls)
1928–1939	Pogoń Lwów	234	(0)
1939–1940	Dynamo Lwów		
1941	Spartak Lwów		
1944–1945	Resovia Rzeszów		
1945–1946	Pogoń Katowice		

International career
1931–1936	Poland	18	(0)

Managerial career
- 1944–1945: Resovia Rzeszów (player-manager)
- 1945–1946: Pogoń Katowice (player-manager)
- * Club domestic league appearances and goals

Spirydion Jan Albański (4 October 1907 – 30 March 1992), nicknamed "Spirytus" and "Romek", was a Polish footballer who played as a goalkeeper. He played for Pogoń Lwów and the Poland national team.

Albański was born in Lwów (Lviv). He graduated from high school after the Second World War, when he was forced to move from Lwów to Upper Silesia, worked in the coal-mining industry. He was later a civil servant, and also a football coach.

== Soccer career ==
He was part of the Pogoń Lwów sports club from 1928 to 1939. After the Soviets captured Lwów in late September 1939 (see: Polish September Campaign#Phase 2: Soviet aggression), he represented the newly created teams of Dinamo Lwów and Spartak Lwów. In 1944, as borders of Poland moved westwards (see: Oder-Neisse line), Albański, together with thousands of Lwów's inhabitants, was forced to leave the city. Firstly, he stayed in Rzeszów, where he played for Resovia Rzeszów. Then, from 1945 to 1946, he played a few games for Pogoń Katowice.

His most prominent seasons were those spent in Pogoń. From 1928 to 1939, Albański played in 234 games of the Polish top division, which is an absolute record among Polish soccer players. He also represented Poland in 18 games (another record for all interwar goalies), including matches of the 1936 Summer Olympics in Berlin.

In the 1930s, Albański was among the most popular athletes in Poland. He was very skilled as a goalkeeper, although he was considered too skinny at first (at the beginning of his career he weighed only 50 kilograms, with a height of 176 centimeters, although later he gained approximately 62 kilograms). He was respected by his colleagues, and was the captain of the team since 1936. In the period of 1930–1939, he played in all games, with 174 consecutive matches altogether.

Albański died in Katowice.

== See also ==
- History of football in Poland
- Polish football in the interwar period
