= 1926 Polish Football Championship =

6th season of top-tier football league in Poland

Polish Football Championship
- Season: 1926
- Dates: 15 August 1926 – 28 November 1926
- Champions: Pogoń Lwów (4th title)
- Matches: 24
- Goals: 145 (6.04 per match)
- Top goalscorer: Józef Garbień; Wacław Kuchar (11 goals)
- Biggest home win: Pogoń 12–0 Lublinianka; Cracovia 12–0 Lublinianka (12 September 1926)
- Biggest away win: 1 ppLeg 0–8 Polonia
- Highest scoring: Pogoń 12–0 Lublinianka; Cracovia 12–0 Lublinianka (12 September 1926)
- Longest unbeaten run: 8 matches Pogoń Lwów
- Longest winless run: 4 matches Lublinianka; 1 ppLeg
- Longest losing run: 4 matches Lublinianka; 1 ppLeg

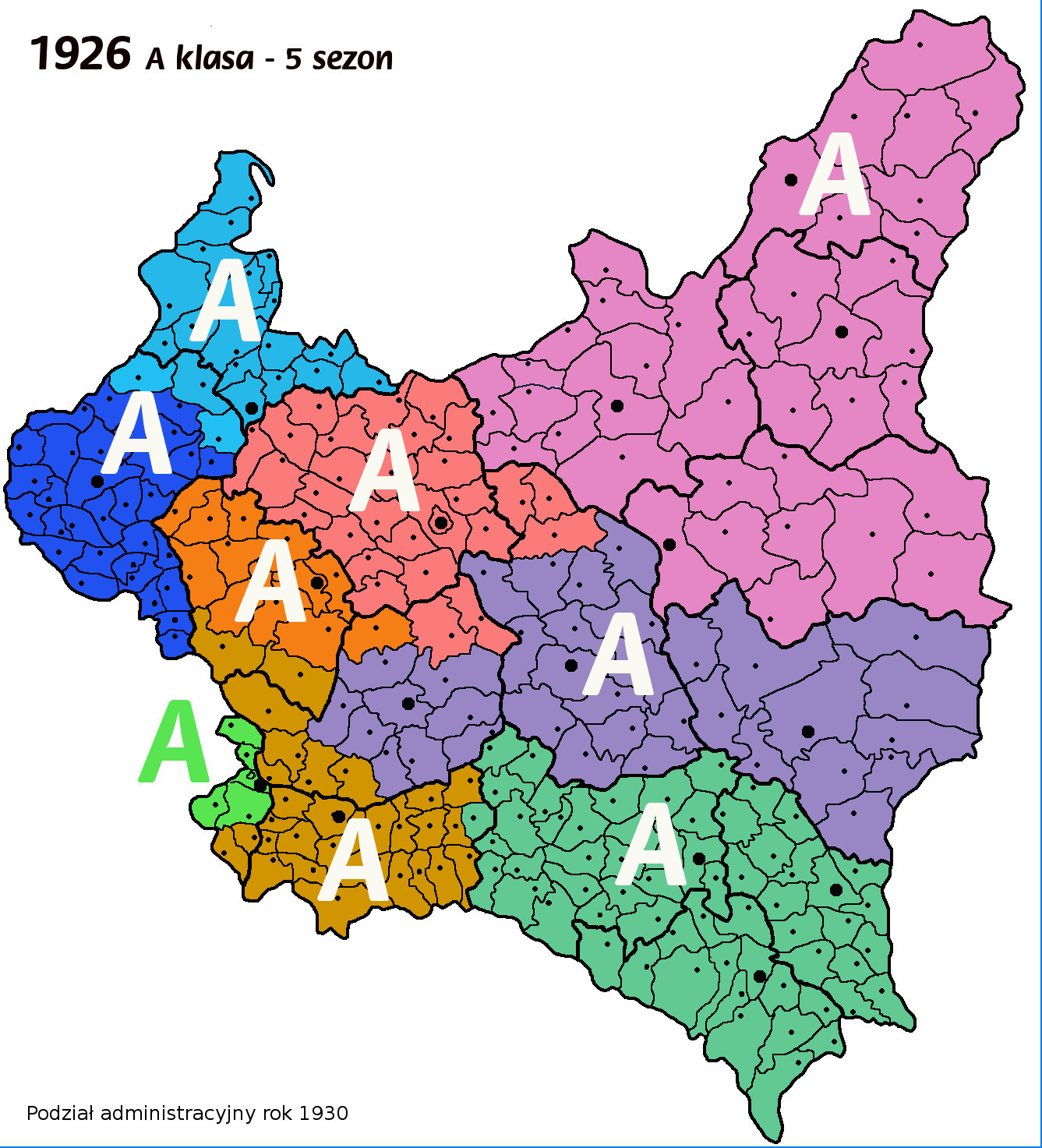
Nine regional A-Classes, whose winners competed in the national championship.

1926 Polish Football Championship was the 6th edition of the Polish Football Championship (Non-League) and 5th completed season ended with the selection of a winner. The championship was decided in final tournament played among nine teams (winners of the regional A-Class championship) participated in the league which was divided into 3 groups: a Northern, a Southern and a Western one. The winners of each groups, Polonia Warsaw, Pogoń Lwów and Warta Poznań, played a Final Group tournament. The champions were Pogoń Lwów, who won their 4th Polish title.

It was the last edition of the Polish championships during the Second Polish Republic played in a non-league formula, because in 1927–1939 the champion of the country was chosen in the league. The next Polish non-league championship was held after the end of World War II – in 1946.

== Competition modus ==
The final tournaments started on 15 August 1926 and concluded on 28 November 1926 (spring-autumn system). In each of groups the season was played as a round-robin tournament. A total of 9 teams participated. Each team played a total of 4 matches, half at home and half away, two games against each other team. Teams received two points for a win and one point for a draw. The winners of each groups played a Final Group tournament for the title.

== Final tournament tables ==
=== Northern Group ===
Pos	Team	Pld	W	D	L	GF	GA	GD	Pts
1	Polonia Warsaw ↑	4	4	0	0	20	2	+18	8
2	TKS Toruń	4	2	0	2	15	8	+7	4
3	WKS 1 ppLeg Wilno	4	0	0	4	2	27	−25	0

Source: rsssf.com

=== Southern Group ===
Pos	Team	Pld	W	D	L	GF	GA	GD	Pts
1	Pogoń Lwów ↑	4	4	0	0	24	2	+22	8
2	Cracovia	4	2	0	2	23	7	+16	4
3	Lublinianka Lublin	4	0	0	4	1	39	−38	0

Source: rsssf.com

=== Western Group ===
Pos	Team	Pld	W	D	L	GF	GA	GD	Pts
1	Warta Poznań ↑	4	4	0	0	18	4	+14	8
2	Klub Turystów Łódź	4	1	0	3	5	10	−5	2
3	Ruch Chorzów	4	1	0	3	4	13	−9	2

Source: rsssf.com

=== Final Group ===
Pos	Team	Pld	W	D	L	GF	GA	GD	Pts
1	Pogoń Lwów	4	2	2	0	13	5	+8	6
2	Polonia Warsaw	4	1	1	2	9	8	+1	3
3	Warta Poznań	4	1	1	2	7	16	−9	3

Source: rsssf.com

== Top goalscorers ==
Rank	Player	Club	Goals
1	(Poland) Józef Garbień	Pogoń Lwów	11
1	(Poland) Wacław Kuchar	Pogoń Lwów	11
3	(Poland) Mieczysław Batsch	Pogoń Lwów	7
3	(Poland) Józef Kubiński	Cracovia	7
3	(Poland) Władysław Przybysz	Warta Poznań	7
3	(Poland) Aleksander Tupalski	Polonia Warsaw	7

== Bibliography ==
- Gowarzewski, Andrzej (2000). Encyklopedia Piłkarska Fuji. Liga Polska. O tytuł mistrza Polski 1920–2000 (in Polish). GiA, Katowice. ISBN 83-88232-02-9.
- Gowarzewski, Andrzej (1994). Encyklopedia Piłkarska Fuji. 75 lat PZPN. Księga jubileuszowa (in Polish). GiA, Katowice. ISBN 83-902751-1-2.
- Gowarzewski, Andrzej (2000). Encyklopedia Piłkarska Fuji. Album 80 lat PZPN (in Polish). GiA, Katowice.
- Gowarzewski, Andrzej (2010). Encyklopedia Piłkarska Fuji. Album 90 lat PZPN (in Polish). GiA, Katowice.
