= 1. FC Katowice =

Polish football club

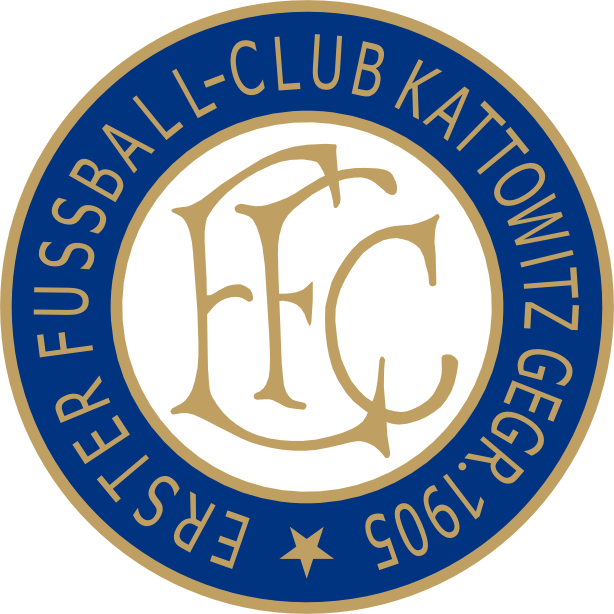
- Full name: 1. FC AZS AWF Katowice
- Founded: 13 April 2007; 18 years ago
- Ground: Sowińskiego 5a, Katowice
- League: Klasa B Katowice
- 2024–25: Klasa B Katowice, 9th of 12
- Website: ks1fc.katowice.pl
Home colours	Away colours

1. FC Katowice is a Polish football club from Katowice, Silesian Voivodeship and was founded in 2007 as a reactivation by the Silesian Autonomy Movement of the 1945 dissolved 1. FC Kattowitz.

== Men's football team ==
The club was reactivated in 2007, and spent most of its time in the klasa B (eighth league level).

== Women's football team ==
The women's section started in the 3rd tier, but has managed two promotions and won the promotion to the Ekstraliga in 2010–11. As a result of the expansion of the Ekstraliga in 2010–11, a third-place finish in the 2009–10 I liga was enough to reach the promotion play-offs, which they won. The women's section played in the top level Ekstraliga Kobiet in the 2010–11, 2011–12 and 2014–15 season. Before the 2015–16 season, the team withdrew from I liga.

In 2015, the women's section was disbanded, citing financial problems. There were plans to transfer the team to GKS Katowice, but eventually GKS re-founded their own women's section.

Competition	07/08	08/09	09/10	10/11	11/12	12/13	13/14	14/15
Ekstraliga				6th	9th			11th
I liga		7th	3rd			3rd	2nd	
II liga	1st							
Polish Cup	—	—	—	—	R16	—	R16	—
Green marks a season followed by promotion, red a season followed by relegation.
