= 1935 Ekstraklasa =

15th season of top-tier football league in Poland

Liga
- Season: 1935
- Champions: Ruch Chorzów (3rd title)
- Relegated: KS Cracovia; Polonia Warsaw
- Top goalscorer: Michał Matyas (22 goals)

Statistics of Ekstraklasa for the 1935 season.

== Overview ==
It was contested by 11 teams, and Ruch Chorzów won the championship.

== League table ==
Pos	Team	Pld	W	D	L	GF	GA	GD	Pts
1	Ruch Chorzów (C)	20	10	6	4	37	26	+11	26
2	Pogoń Lwów	20	11	3	6	55	31	+24	25
3	Warta Poznań	20	10	4	6	50	33	+17	24
4	Wisła Kraków	20	10	3	7	51	33	+18	23
5	Śląsk Świętochłowice	20	10	2	8	34	40	−6	22
6	ŁKS Łódź	20	9	2	9	30	34	−4	20
7	Garbarnia Kraków	20	7	5	8	37	31	+6	19
8	Warszawianka Warszawa	20	6	6	8	29	37	−8	18
9	Legia Warsaw	20	8	2	10	32	46	−14	18
10	KS Cracovia (R)	20	6	5	9	34	34	0	17
11	Polonia Warsaw (R)	20	3	2	15	15	57	−42	8

Source: 90minut.pl (in Polish)
(C) Champions; (R) Relegated

== Results ==
Home \ Away	CRA	GAR	LEG	ŁKS	POG	PWA	RUC	ŚWI	WAW	WAR	WIS
Cracovia		1–1	4–1	5–1	0–3	3–2	0–0	1–1	4–1	3–1	5–0
Garbarnia Kraków	1–0		8–0	1–0	1–1	6–0	1–1	5–1	0–1	2–1	1–1
Legia Warsaw	3–2	0–0		0–1	3–0 (Note: The match between Legia Warsaw and Pogoń Lwów was stopped at the score of 0–1 because a eliminated player refused to leave the field. It was scored 0–3.)	1–1	6–0	5–4	1–2	4–2	4–0
ŁKS Łódź	1–1	4–1	0–1		3–1	2–0	4–2	1–0	2–1	4–1	1–2
Pogoń Lwów	3–1	4–1	6–1	5–0		3–0	4–1	1–2	7–2	1–1	3–1
Polonia Warsaw	2–1	1–4	1–0	0–3	2–4		1–2	1–3	0–0	1–2	3–2
Ruch Chorzów	1–1	1–0	1–0	5–0	4–0	2–0		4–2	1–0	1–1	4–2
Śląsk Świętochłowice	2–1	3–1	1–2	1–0	1–0	3–0 (Note: The match between Śląsk Świętochłowice and Polonia Warsaw (originally finished 2–0) was rated with 3–0 win for home team.)	0–5		2–0	3–1	2–0
Warszawianka	2–1	2–0	2–3	3–1	2–2	2–0	1–1	2–2		1–1	1–3
Warta Poznań	4–0	5–1	3–0	0–0	5–3	6–2	3–1	6–0	3–1		3–2
Wisła Kraków	4–0	4–2	5–0	4–2	3–1	8–1	0–0	4–1	3–3	3–1	

Source: 90minut.pl (in Polish)
Legend: Blue = home team win; Yellow = draw; Red = away team win.
