= 1933 Ekstraklasa =

13th season of top-tier football league in Poland

Liga
- Season: 1933
- Champions: Ruch Chorzów (1st title)
- Relegated: Czarni Lwów
- Matches: 120
- Goals: 415 (3.46 per match)
- Top goalscorer: Artur Woźniak (19 goals)
- Biggest home win: Wisła 10:1 Podgórze
- Biggest away win: Podgórze 0:4 Wisła; ŁKS Łódź 0:4 Legia
- Highest scoring: Wisła 10:1 Podgórze

Statistics of Ekstraklasa for the 1933 season.

== Overview ==
It was contested by 12 teams, and Ruch Chorzów won the championship.

== First phase ==
=== Eastern Group ===
Pos	Team	Pld	W	D	L	GF	GA	GD	Pts	Qualification
1	Pogoń Lwów	10	6	3	1	19	14	+5	15	Qualification to championship group
2	Legia Warsaw	10	5	2	3	19	14	+5	12	Qualification to championship group
3	ŁKS Łódź	10	5	1	4	15	9	+6	11	Qualification to championship group
4	Czarni Lwów	10	4	2	4	12	13	−1	10	Qualification to relegation group
5	Warszawianka Warszawa	10	2	5	3	8	9	−1	9	Qualification to relegation group
6	22 pp Siedlce	10	1	1	8	15	29	−14	3	Qualification to relegation group

Source: 90minut.pl (in Polish)

==== Results ====
Home \ Away	22P	CZA	LEG	ŁKS	POG	WAW
22 pp Siedlce		2–4	1–3	1–3	2–3	2–2
Czarni Lwów	2–1		1–2	1–0	1–1	1–0
Legia Warsaw	4–2	3–0		0–3	3–3	0–0
ŁKS Łódź	3–1	1–0	0–4		5–0	0–1
Pogoń Lwów	4–1	2–1	2–0	1–0		2–0
Warszawianka	1–2	1–1	2–0	0–0	1–1	

Source: 90minut.pl (in Polish)
Legend: Blue = home team win; Yellow = draw; Red = away team win.

=== Western Group ===
Pos	Team	Pld	W	D	L	GF	GA	GD	Pts	Qualification
1	KS Cracovia	10	6	2	2	22	12	+10	14	Qualification to championship group
2	Ruch Chorzów	10	7	0	3	23	13	+10	14	Qualification to championship group
3	Wisła Kraków	10	5	2	3	23	12	+11	12	Qualification to championship group
4	Garbarnia Kraków	10	5	2	3	16	18	−2	12	Qualification to relegation group
5	Warta Poznań	10	3	0	7	15	16	−1	6	Qualification to relegation group
6	Podgórze Kraków	10	1	0	9	7	35	−28	2	Qualification to relegation group

Source: 90minut.pl (in Polish)

==== Results ====
Home \ Away	CRA	GAR	POD	RUC	WAR	WIS
Cracovia		1–3	3–0	2–0	4–1	3–0 (Note: Match awarded.)
Garbarnia Kraków	1–1		1–0	4–2	0–1	2–2
Podgórze Kraków	2–4	0–3		1–2	2–0	0–4
Ruch Chorzów	4–1	6–0	4–1		2–1	1–0
Warta Poznań	0–2	5–0	4–0	1–2		1–2
Wisła Kraków	1–1	0–2	10–1	2–0	2–1	

Source: 90minut.pl (in Polish)
Legend: Blue = home team win; Yellow = draw; Red = away team win.

== Final phase ==
=== Championship group ===
Pos	Team	Pld	W	D	L	GF	GA	GD	Pts
1	Ruch Chorzów (C)	10	7	0	3	25	15	+10	14
2	Pogoń Lwów	10	6	1	3	29	16	+13	13
3	Wisła Kraków	10	5	3	2	15	9	+6	13
4	KS Cracovia	10	4	2	4	20	19	+1	10
5	ŁKS Łódź	10	2	2	6	11	27	−16	6
6	Legia Warsaw	10	1	2	7	11	25	−14	4

Source: 90minut.pl (in Polish)
(C) Champions

==== Results ====
Home \ Away	CRA	LEG	ŁKS	POG	RUC	WIS
Cracovia		6–2	3–2	3–1	1–2	1–3
Legia Warsaw	2–2		2–2	1–2	1–0	2–3
ŁKS Łódź	0–1	1–0		3–1	0–4	1–1
Pogoń Lwów	3–1	3–1	9–0		7–1	1–0
Ruch Chorzów	3–1	3–0 (Note: Match awarded.)	5–2	5–1		2–1
Wisła Kraków	1–1	3–0	1–0	1–1	1–0	

Source: 90minut.pl (in Polish)
Legend: Blue = home team win; Yellow = draw; Red = away team win.

=== Relegation group ===
Pos	Team	Pld	W	D	L	GF	GA	GD	Pts	Qualification
1	Warszawianka Warszawa	10	5	2	3	22	16	+6	12	
2	22 pp Siedlce	10	5	1	4	18	20	−2	11	
3	Warta Poznań	10	4	2	4	18	18	0	10	
4	Podgórze Kraków	10	4	2	4	12	15	−3	10	
5	Czarni Lwów (R)	10	4	1	5	18	20	−2	9	Qualification to relegation playoffs
6	Garbarnia Kraków	10	3	2	5	22	21	+1	8	Qualification to relegation playoffs

Source: 90minut.pl (in Polish)
(R) Relegated

==== Results ====
Home \ Away	22P	CZA	GAR	POD	WAW	WAR
22 pp Siedlce		2–0	3–2	3–0	0–3 (Note: Match awarded.)	1–0
Czarni Lwów	3–4		2–4	5–1	0–0	4–2
Garbarnia Kraków	6–2	4–0		0–0	1–2	1–1
Podgórze Kraków	2–0	1–0	2–0		2–2	4–1
Warszawianka	2–1	2–3	5–3	2–0		2–3
Warta Poznań	2–2	0–1	4–1	2–0	3–2	

Source: 90minut.pl (in Polish)
Legend: Blue = home team win; Yellow = draw; Red = away team win.

== Promotion/relegation playoffs ==
Pos	Team	Pld	W	D	L	GF	GA	GD	Pts	Qualification or relegation
1	Garbarnia Kraków	3	3	0	0	13	3	+10	6	Remain in 1934 Liga
2	Śmigły Wilno	4	1	0	3	8	10	−2	2	
3	Czarni Lwów (R)	3	1	0	2	5	13	−8	2	Relegation

Source: rsssf.com
(R) Relegated
