= 1925 Polish Football Championship =

5th season of top-tier football league in Poland

Polish Football Championship
- Season: 1925
- Dates: 29 March 1925 – 30 August 1925
- Champions: Pogoń Lwów (3rd title)
- Matches: 25
- Goals: 90 (3.6 per match)
- Top goalscorer: Henryk Reyman (11 goals)
- Biggest home win: Wisła 5–0 Warta (30 August 1925)
- Biggest away win: Pogoń W. 0–5 Pogoń L.
- Highest scoring: ŁKS 3–6 Wisła (11 June 1925)
- Longest winning run: 7 matches Pogoń Lwów
- Longest unbeaten run: 8 matches Pogoń Lwów
- Longest winless run: 4 matches AKS Chorzów
- Longest losing run: 4 matches AKS Chorzów

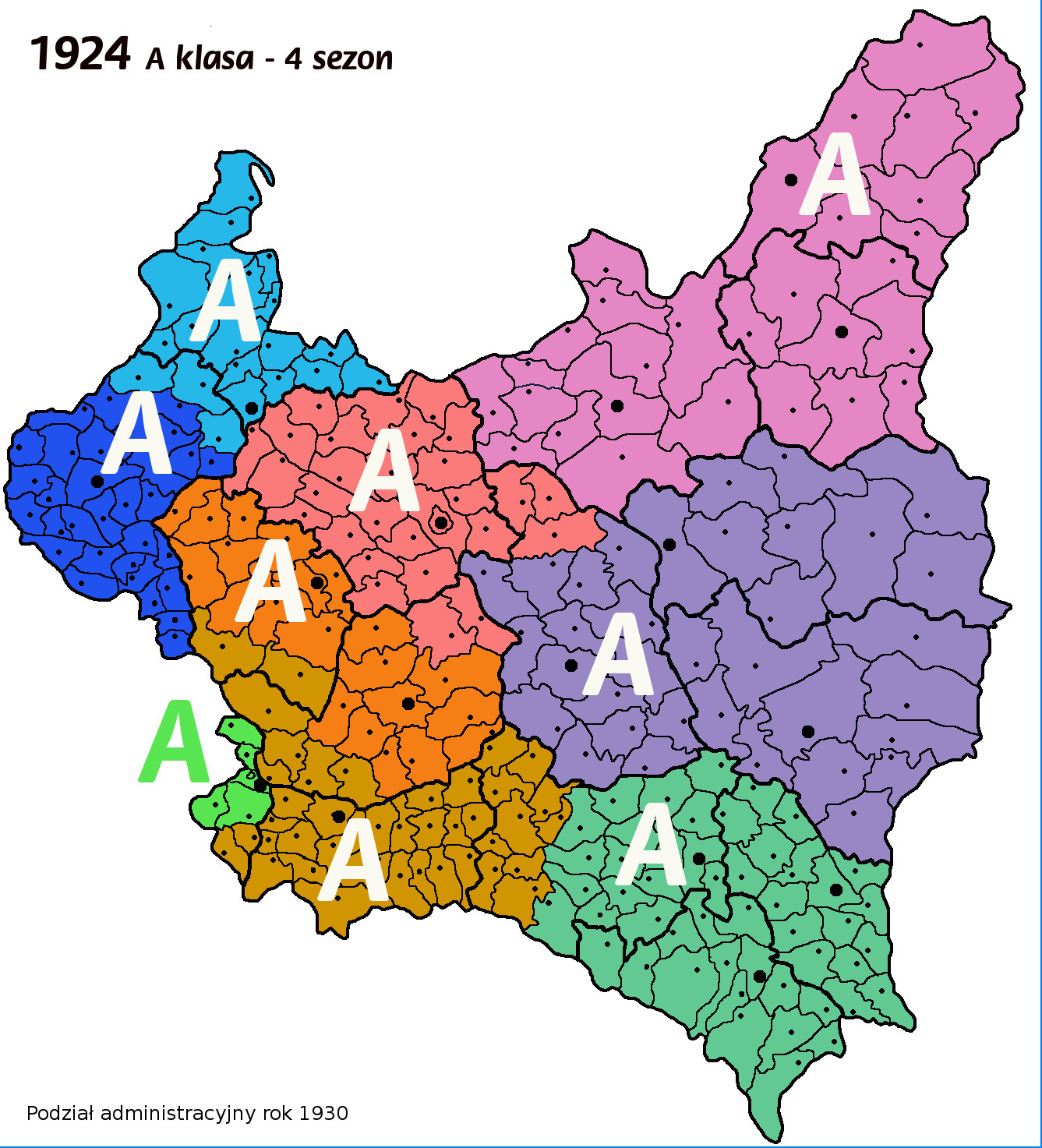
Nine regional A-Classes, whose winners competed in the national championship.

1925 Polish Football Championship was the 5th edition of the Polish Football Championship (Non-League) and 4th completed season ended with the selection of a winner. The championship was decided in final tournament played among nine teams (winners of the regional A-Class championship) participated in the league which was divided into 3 groups: an Eastern, a Northern and a Southern one. The winners of each groups, Pogoń Lwów, Warta Poznań and Wisła Kraków, played a Final Group tournament. The champions were Pogoń Lwów, who won their 3rd Polish title.

The championships were held after a one-year break, as the 1924 Polish Championships were abandoned due to the preparations of the Poland national team to participate in the 1924 Olympic Football Tournament.

== Competition modus ==
The final tournaments started on 29 March 1925 and concluded on 30 August 1925 (spring-autumn system). In each of groups the season was played as a round-robin tournament. A total of 9 teams participated. Each team played a total of 4 matches, half at home and half away, two games against each other team. Teams received two points for a win and one point for a draw. The winners of each groups played a Final Group tournament for the title.

== Final tournament tables ==
=== Eastern Group ===
Pos	Team	Pld	W	D	L	GF	GA	GD	Pts
1	Pogoń Lwów ↑	4	4	0	0	12	1	+11	8
2	Pogoń Wilno	4	1	0	3	5	11	−6	2
3	Lublinianka Lublin	4	1	0	3	3	8	−5	2

Source: rsssf.com

=== Northern Group ===
Pos	Team	Pld	W	D	L	GF	GA	GD	Pts
1	Warta Poznań ↑	4	3	0	1	11	6	+5	6
2	TKS Toruń	4	2	0	2	7	7	0	4
3	Polonia Warsaw	4	1	0	3	5	10	−5	2

Source: rsssf.com

=== Southern Group ===
Pos	Team	Pld	W	D	L	GF	GA	GD	Pts
1	Wisła Kraków ↑	4	3	0	1	10	3	+7	6
2	ŁKS Łódź ↑	4	3	0	1	9	4	+5	6
3	AKS Chorzów	4	0	0	4	0	12	−12	0

Source: rsssf.com

Additional Playoff Match

Team 1	Score	Team 2
ŁKS Łódź	3–6 in Lwów	Wisła Kraków ↑

=== Final Group ===
Pos	Team	Pld	W	D	L	GF	GA	GD	Pts
1	Pogoń Lwów	4	3	1	0	8	3	+5	7
2	Warta Poznań	4	1	1	2	5	12	−7	3
3	Wisła Kraków	4	1	0	3	6	4	+2	2

Source: rsssf.com

== Top goalscorers ==
Rank	Player	Club	Goals
1	(Poland) Henryk Reyman	Wisła Kraków	11
2	(Poland) Mieczysław Batsch	Pogoń Lwów	7
3	(Poland) Stefan Schmidt	Warta Poznań	6

== Bibliography ==
- Gowarzewski, Andrzej (2000). Encyklopedia Piłkarska Fuji. Liga Polska. O tytuł mistrza Polski 1920–2000 (in Polish). GiA, Katowice. ISBN 83-88232-02-9.
- Gowarzewski, Andrzej (1994). Encyklopedia Piłkarska Fuji. 75 lat PZPN. Księga jubileuszowa (in Polish). GiA, Katowice. ISBN 83-902751-1-2.
- Gowarzewski, Andrzej (2000). Encyklopedia Piłkarska Fuji. Album 80 lat PZPN (in Polish). GiA, Katowice.
- Gowarzewski, Andrzej (2010). Encyklopedia Piłkarska Fuji. Album 90 lat PZPN (in Polish). GiA, Katowice.
