= Dąb Katowice =

Polish sports club

GKS Dąb Katowice
- Full name: Górniczy Klub Sportowy Dąb Katowice
- Short name: Dąb Katowice
- Founded: 1911 as SV Eiche
- Dissolved: 1968
- Ground: Kolyba, Dąb
Home colors

Dąb Katowice was a Polish sports club from the Upper Silesian capital of Katowice.

The club was founded in 1911 as Sport Verein Eiche in what was then the mining village of Domb located in the Province of Upper Silesia, German Empire, before restructuring and changing its name to "Dąb" in 1922.

Dąb had numerous sports sections, including swimming (multiple champions of Poland in the years 1935–1939), boxing, gymnastics, ice-hockey (champion of Poland 1939), wrestling, cycling and association football. Their ice hockey club was the first in Poland to feature Canadian players.

Dąb's football team played two seasons in the Polish top flight in 1936, when they finished 8th, and in 1937, when they were expelled from the league mid-season, due to an attempt to bribe the Śląsk Świętochłowice goalkeeper to aid their relegation battle. All Dąb's results were expunged (recorded as 0–3 losses) and the team was relegated as result.

Dąb's most famous player (and later manager) was Ewald Dytko, who took part in the famous 1938 World Cup round of 16 tie against Brazil on 5 June 1938 in Strasbourg, which ended in a 5-6 loss for his Poland side.

After the Second World War, from 1946, the club underwent further name changes and mergers before adopting its pre-war name in 1957.

The club existed until 9 September 1968, when it was merged into GKS Katowice. Since 1963, GKS had been in a process of absorbing local clubs in order to form one strong club for the city.
