= 1938 FIFA World Cup qualification Group 2b =

Football tournament qualification stage

In the 1938 FIFA World Cup qualification Group 2b, the two teams played against each other on a home-and-away basis. The winner Poland qualified for the third FIFA World Cup held in France.

== Matches ==
=== Poland vs Yugoslavia ===
| Poland | 4 — 0 (final score after 90 minutes) | (Kingdom of Yugoslavia) Yugoslavia |
| Manager: (Poland) Józef Kałuża Team: 01 - GK - Adolf Krzyk; 02 - DF - Władysław Szczepaniak (capt.); 03 - DF - Antoni Gałecki; 04 - MF - Wilhelm Góra; 05 - MF - Erwin Nyc; 06 - MF - Ewald Dytko; 07 - FW - Bolesław Habowski; 08 - FW - Leonard Piątek; 09 - FW - Jerzy Wostal; 10 - FW - Ernst Wilimowski; 11 - FW - Gerard Wodarz Substitutes: none Unused Substitutes: GK - Edward Madejski; FW - Walerian Kisieliński; ? - Jerzy Kula; ? - Sylwester Nowakowski; ? - Jan Pająk; Scorers: 1-0 Leonard Piątek (3'); 2-0 Leonard Piątek (4'); 3-0 Jerzy Wostal (57'); 4-0 Ernst Wilimowski (78') | Half-time: 2-0 Competition: World Cup qualifier 1938 (Group 3) Date: Sunday; 10 October 1937 Kick off: 12 noon Venue: Legia Stadium, Warsaw Attendance: 30000 Referee: Lucien Leclerq FRA Assistants: ? Match rules: 90 minutes substitutes ? | Manager: (Kingdom of Yugoslavia) Svetozar Popović Team: 01 - GK - Franjo Glaser; 02 - DF - Bernard Hügl; 03 - DF - Jozo Matošić; 04 - MF - Gustav Lehner; 05 - MF - Ivan Stevović; 06 - MF - Mirko Kokotović; 07 - FW - Ivan Medarić; 08 - FW - Blagoje Marjanović; 09 - FW - Svetislav Valjarević; 10 - FW - Đorđe Vujadinović (capt.); 11 - FW - Branko Pleše Substitutes: none Unused Substitutes: ?; Scorers: - |

=== Yugoslavia vs Poland ===
| (Kingdom of Yugoslavia) Yugoslavia | 1 — 0 (final score after 90 minutes) | Poland |
| Manager: (Kingdom of Yugoslavia) Svetozar Popović Team: 01 - GK - Franjo Glaser; 02 - DF - Bernard Hügl; 03 - DF - Ernest Dubac; 04 - MF - Gustav Lehner; 05 - MF - Ivan Jazbinšek; 06 - MF - Bruno Knežević; 07 - FW - August Šipoš; 08 - FW - Blagoje Marjanović; 09 - FW - August Lešnik; 10 - FW - Vojin Božović; 11 - FW - Mirko Kokotović Substitutes: none Unused Substitutes: ? Scorers: 1-0 Blagoje Marjanović (65') | Half-time: 0-0 Competition: World Cup qualifier 1938 (Group 3) Date: Sunday; 3 April 1938 Kick off: 4 p.m. Venue: BSK Stadion, Belgrade Attendance: 25000 Referee: Rinaldo Barlassina ITA Assistants: ? Match rules: 90 minutes substitutes ? | Manager: (Poland) Józef Kałuża Team: 01 - GK - Edward Madejski; 02 - DF - Władysław Szczepaniak (capt.); 03 - DF - Antoni Gałecki; 04 - MF - Wilhelm Góra; 05 - MF - Erwin Nyc; 06 - MF - Ewald Dytko; 07 - FW - Ryszard Piec; 08 - FW - Leonard Piątek; 09 - FW - Jerzy Wostal; 10 - FW - Ernst Wilimowski; 11 - FW - Gerard Wodarz Substitutes: none Unused Substitutes: GK - Władysław Pawłowski; DF - Erwin Michalski; FW - Fryderyk Scherfke; ? - Sylwester Nowakowski; Scorers: - |

Poland qualified on goal difference.

== Team stats ==
=== Poland ===
Head coach: (Poland) Józef Kałuża

| Pos. | Player | DoB | Games played | Goals | Minutes played | Sub off | Sub on | (Kingdom of Yugoslavia) | (Kingdom of Yugoslavia) | Club |
|---|---|---|---|---|---|---|---|---|---|---|
| MF | Ewald Dytko | October 18, 1914 | 2 | 0 | 180 | 0 | 0 | 90 | 90 | (Poland) Dąb Katowice |
| DF | Antoni Gałecki | June 4, 1906 | 2 | 0 | 180 | 0 | 0 | 90 | 90 | (Poland) ŁKS Łódź |
| MF | Wilhelm Góra | January 18, 1916 | 2 | 0 | 180 | 0 | 0 | 90 | 90 | (Poland) Cracovia |
| FW | Bolesław Habowski | September 13, 1914 | 1 | 0 | 90 | 0 | 0 | 90 | - | (Poland) Wisła Kraków |
| FW | Walerian Kisieliński | March 1, 1907 | 0 | 0 | 0 | 0 | 0 | B | - | (Poland) Polonia Warsaw |
| GK | Adolf Krzyk | December 25, 1907 | 1 | 0 | 90 | 0 | 0 | 90 | - | (Poland) Brygada Częstochowa |
| | Jerzy Kula | | 0 | 0 | 0 | 0 | 0 | B | - |
| GK | Edward Madejski | August 11, 1914 | 1 | 0 | 90 | 0 | 0 | B | 90 | no club |
| FW | Michał Matyas | September 28, 1910 | 0 | 0 | 0 | 0 | 0 | B | - | (Poland) Pogoń Lwów |
| DF | Erwin Michalski | June 27, 1912 | 0 | 0 | 0 | 0 | 0 | - | B | (Poland) Naprzód Lipiny |
| | Sylwester Nowakowski | December 26, 1913 | 0 | 0 | 0 | 0 | 0 | B | B |
| MF | Erwin Nyc | May 24, 1914 | 2 | 0 | 180 | 0 | 0 | 90 | 90 | (Poland) Polonia Warsaw |
| | Jan Pajak | May 12, 1906 | 0 | 0 | 0 | 0 | 0 | B | - |
| GK | Władysław Pawłowski | August 19, 1915 | 0 | 0 | 0 | 0 | 0 | - | B | (Poland) Cracovia |
| FW | Leonard Piątek | October 13, 1913 | 2 | 2 | 180 | 0 | 0 | 90 | 90 | (Poland) AKS Chorzów |
| FW | Ryszard Piec | August 17, 1913 | 1 | 0 | 90 | 0 | 0 | - | 90 | (Poland) Naprzód Lipiny |
| FW | Fryderyk Scherfke | September 7, 1909 | 0 | 0 | 0 | 0 | 0 | - | B | (Poland) Warta Poznań |
| DF | Władysław Szczepaniak | May 19, 1910 | 2 | 0 | 180 | 0 | 0 | 90 | 90 | (Poland) Polonia Warsaw |
| FW | Ernst Wilimowski | June 23, 1916 | 2 | 1 | 180 | 0 | 0 | 90 | 90 | (Poland) Ruch Chorzów |
| FW | Gerard Wodarz | August 10, 1913 | 2 | 0 | 180 | 0 | 0 | 90 | 90 | (Poland) Ruch Chorzów |
| FW | Jerzy Wostal | January 6, 1914 | 2 | 1 | 180 | 0 | 0 | 90 | 90 | (Poland) AKS Chorzów |

=== Yugoslavia ===
Head coach: (Kingdom of Yugoslavia) Svetozar Popović

| Pos. | Player | DoB | Games played | Goals | Minutes played | Sub off | Sub on | (Poland) | (Poland) | Club |
|---|---|---|---|---|---|---|---|---|---|---|
| FW | Vojin Božović | January 1, 1913 | 1 | 0 | 90 | 0 | 0 | - | 90 | (Kingdom of Yugoslavia) Beogradski SK |
| DF | Ernest Dubac | February 15, 1914 | 1 | 0 | 90 | 0 | 0 | - | 90 | (Kingdom of Yugoslavia) Beogradski SK |
| GK | Franjo Glaser | January 13, 1913 | 2 | 0 | 180 | 0 | 0 | 90 | 90 | (Kingdom of Yugoslavia) Građanski Zagreb |
| DF | Bernard Hügl | March 27, 1908 | 2 | 0 | 180 | 0 | 0 | 90 | 90 | (Kingdom of Yugoslavia) Građanski Zagreb |
| MF | Ivan Jazbinšek | August 9, 1914 | 1 | 0 | 90 | 0 | 0 | - | 90 | (Kingdom of Yugoslavia) Građanski Zagreb |
| MF | Bruno Knežević | March 12, 1915 | 1 | 0 | 90 | 0 | 0 | - | 90 | (Kingdom of Yugoslavia) Beogradski SK |
| FW | Mirko Kokotović | April 15, 1913 | 2 | 0 | 180 | 0 | 0 | 90 | 90 | (Kingdom of Yugoslavia) Građanski Zagreb |
| MF | Gustav Lehner | February 17, 1913 | 2 | 0 | 180 | 0 | 0 | 90 | 90 | (Kingdom of Yugoslavia) Beogradski SK |
| FW | August Lešnik | July 16, 1914 | 1 | 0 | 90 | 0 | 0 | - | 90 | (Kingdom of Yugoslavia) Građanski Zagreb |
| FW | Blagoje Marjanović | September 3, 1907 | 2 | 1 | 180 | 0 | 0 | 90 | 90 | (Kingdom of Yugoslavia) Beogradski SK |
| DF | Jozo Matošić | January 27, 1913 | 1 | 0 | 90 | 0 | 0 | 90 | - | (Kingdom of Yugoslavia) Hajduk Split |
| FW | Ivan Medarić | November 11, 1912 | 1 | 0 | 90 | 0 | 0 | 90 | - | (Kingdom of Yugoslavia) HAŠK Zagreb |
| FW | Branko Pleše | January 12, 1915 | 1 | 0 | 90 | 0 | 0 | 90 | - | (Kingdom of Yugoslavia) Građanski Zagreb |
| FW | August Šipoš | January 24, 1914 | 1 | 0 | 90 | 0 | 0 | - | 90 | (Kingdom of Yugoslavia) Građanski Zagreb |
| MF | Ivan Stevović | September 6, 1910 | 1 | 0 | 90 | 0 | 0 | 90 | - | (Kingdom of Yugoslavia) Beogradski SK |
| FW | Svetislav Valjarević | July 9, 1911 | 1 | 0 | 90 | 0 | 0 | 90 | - | (Kingdom of Yugoslavia) Beogradski SK |
| FW | Đorđe Vujadinović | November 29, 1909 | 1 | 0 | 90 | 0 | 0 | 90 | - | (Kingdom of Yugoslavia) Beogradski SK |
