= 1939 Poland v Hungary football match =

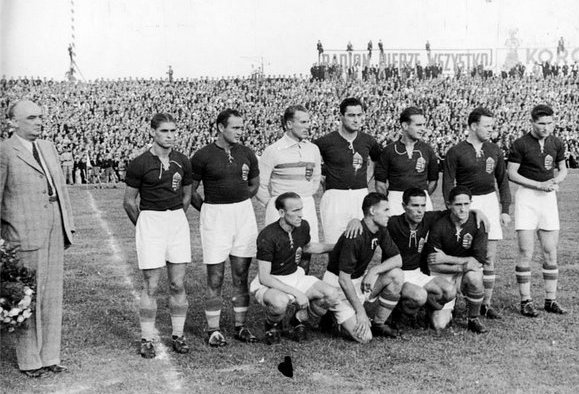
- Hungarian team posing before the game on Warsaw's Stadion Wojska Polskiego
- Event: Friendly
Poland	Hungary
4	2
- Date: 27 August 1939
- Venue: Stadion Wojska Polskiego, Warsaw
- Referee: Esko K. Pekonen (Finland)
- Attendance: 20,000

The Last Game, as it is known in Poland, was played on Sunday, 27 August 1939, at the Stadion Wojska Polskiego in Warsaw. It was the last game of the interwar Polish football team before the Second World War. The Poland national football team faced and beat one of the best teams of that period – FIFA World Cup (1938) runners-up, Hungary, four goals to two. This match has generally been forgotten by the Hungarians – for them it was just one of many international friendlies, without any significance. In Poland, however, it is still remembered as the last match before World War II and also because it was a victory over a renowned team – the biggest success in history of Polish football up to that time.

Four days before the match, the Germans and the Soviets had secretly signed the Molotov–Ribbentrop Pact, according to which Poland was to be wiped off the map of Europe. The perception in Warsaw was that something was up in the air, mobilization of the Polish Army was supposed to be announced at any time, but in spite of this people were hoping for the best, enjoying the weather and last days of summer vacation.

In 1939, the Hungarian football team was widely regarded as one of the best in the world, and hardly anyone in Poland believed that their players in white and red uniforms, their national colours, were going to win over their opponents. This opinion was echoed by the nation's largest sports daily Przegląd Sportowy, which in Saturday's issue exclaimed in large print on the front page, "Without chances, but ready to fight". Poland was to face the Hungarians for the ninth time – up to then, the Poles had never won.

A famous Scotsman Alex James, who in the summer of 1939 temporarily helped Józef Kałuża with training of Polish players, had left Warsaw for Britain a few days earlier. It is likely he too felt that war was imminent and wanted to escape the country. James did not believe in Poland's victory, either. Just before the game, he sent three dispatches advising Poles to concentrate on defence and hope for a lucky draw.

== Match details ==
27 August 1939
17:00 CET

Poland	4–2	Hungary
Wilimowski 33', 64', 74'; Piontek 73' (pen.)		Zsengellér 14'; Ádám 30'

Stadion Wojska Polskiego, Warsaw
Attendance: 20,000
Referee: Esko K. Pekonen (Finland)

Poland	Hungary

1	Adolf Krzyk (Brygada Częstochowa)
2	Władysław Szczepaniak (Polonia Warszawa; c)
3	Edmund Giemsa (Ruch Chorzów)
4	Wilhelm Góra (Cracovia)
5	Edward Jabłoński (Cracovia)
6	Ewald Dytko (Dąb Katowice)
7	Henryk Jaźnicki (Polonia) (substituted off) 31' (substituted on) Stanisław Baran (Warszawianka)
8	Ewald Cebula (Śląsk Świętochłowice)
9	Leonard Piontek (AKS Chorzów)
10	Ernest Wilimowski (Ruch Chorzów)
11	Paweł Cyganek (Fablok Chrzanów)
Coach:
Józef Kałuża

1	Ferenc Sziklai (Újpest FC)
2	Károly Kis (MTK Hungária FC)
3	Sándor Bíró (MTK Hungária FC)
4	Antal Szalay (Újpest FC)
5	József Turay (MTK Hungária FC; c)
6	János Dudás (MTK Hungária FC)
7	Sándor Ádám (Újpest FC)
8	György Sárosi (Ferencvárosi TC)
9	Gyula Zsengellér (Újpest FC)
10	Géza Toldi (Ferencvárosi TC)
11	László Gyetvai (Ferencvárosi TC)
Coach:
Dénes Ginzery

Match rules

- 90 minutes.
- 30 minutes of extra-time if necessary.
- Replay if scores still level.

== Match summary ==
At 5 p.m. sharp, Finnish referee Esko K. Pekonen blew his whistle for the first time. For the first half hour, the visitors were the more effective team, ceaselessly attacking Krzyk's goal, who got into difficulties early on. In just fourteen minutes time, Hungary's Gyula Zsengeller scored the first goal from a short distance. The Polish fans, many of them in military uniforms, who overflowed the stands, were suddenly quieted. In the 30th minute, another goal was scored by Hungary – this time by Sándor Ádám. It looked like Poland was going to get a drubbing, but soon the Poles managed to regain control of the game.

Just 180 seconds later, in the 33rd minute, Dytko passed the ball to Piontek who headed it to Wilimowski. The Polish topscorer ran a few meters and then fired high into the net, above the goalie. Poland continued attacking during the remainder of the half.

In second half, the situation continued, with Polish players attacking and the Hungarians unable to defend their score. In the 64th minute, Jablonski passed the ball to Piontek, who then put Wilimowski into action. 'Ezi' dribbled past two defenders and shot from a close range.

In the 75th minute of the game, Hungarian defender Sándor Bíró touched the ball with his hand in penalty area and conceded the foul. Piatek shot with force and precision, making the score 3–2. Just 60 seconds later – another feat by Wilimowski. The Hungarians were unable to take the ball away from him which resulted in another goal: 4–2, settling the game.

During the last minutes, the Polish side, happy with the result, attempted to defend it and although the Hungarians managed to score a goal, one of their players was in an off-side position and so it was disallowed.

== After the match ==
At the final whistle, the Polish fans were overcome with joy. They had just witnessed the biggest success to date in the history of Polish football. Everybody was in good mood, hoping that political situation would – just like events in the game – get better. The visitors, although unhappy, accepted the defeat with honor, stating that the Poles were a better team.

However, there were people who were predicting catastrophe. Ominous were the words of the director of PZPN, Colonel Kazimierz Glabisz, who during the after-game banquet said: "Who knows – maybe this was the last game before another war?"

== The games that never took place ==
Meanwhile, Polish officials were planning the next games. On Sunday 3 September 1939, in Warsaw, Poland was going to face Bulgaria. Coach Kaluza had already selected players for this match. These were:

- Walter Brom, Ruch Chorzów,
- Edmund Giemsa, Ruch Chorzów,
- Michal Dusik, KPW Poznań,
- Kazimierz Lis, Warta Poznań,
- Wilhelm Piec, Naprzód Lipiny,
- Henryk Mikunda, Ruch Chorzów,
- Aleksander Schreier, Warta Poznań,
- Boleslaw Gendera, Warta Poznań,
- Ewald Cebula, Śląsk Świętochłowice,
- Franciszek Pytel, AKS Chorzów,
- Paweł Cyganek, Fablok Chrzanów.

In reserve stayed: Adolf Krzyk (Brygada Częstochowa), Władysław Szczepaniak and Stanislaw Filipek (both Polonia Warszawa), Edmund Białas (KPW Poznań).

Then, on Wednesday 6 September 1939, probably in Belgrade, Poland was scheduled to face Yugoslavia. Coach Kaluza decided to send there almost identical team as the one that beat Hungary. There was only one difference – Schreier was going to replace Jaznicki. In reserve were: Brom, Pytel, Bialas and Piec.

On 24 September 1939 two international friendlies were scheduled. Polish first team was going to play Romania in Warsaw, Polish reserve was going to go to Helsinki, to face Finland.

On Friday 1 September 1939 Germany invaded, World War II started, and Sunday's game was the last match of inter-war Poland.

== See also ==
- History of football in Poland
- Polish football in interwar period
- 1921 Hungary v Poland football match — first match between the two sides
