= Kattowitz (disambiguation) =

Kattowitz is the German name for the Polish city of Katowice.

Kattowitz may also refer to:

== Places ==
- Katowice (parliamentary constituency)
- Kattowitz (region)
- Katowice Forest Park
- Katowice Voivodeship

== Sports ==
- 1. FC Kattowitz, an ethnically German association football club playing in what was Kattowitz, Silesia Province in Germany (now Katowice, Silesian Voivodeship, Poland) and was active during the inter-war period and World War II when the two countries struggled over control of the region
- Germania Kattowitz, an ethnically German association football club playing in what was Kattowitz, Upper Silesia in Germany (now Katowice, Poland) before the First World War and shortly afterwards
- Diana Kattowitz, an ethnically German association football club playing in what was Kattowitz, Upper Silesia in Germany (now Katowice, Poland) during the inter-war period

== Other ==
- Kattowitzer Volkswille, a newspaper in Weimar Germany
