= Brazil v Poland (1938 FIFA World Cup) =

Football match in Strasbourg, France

1938 FIFA World Cup Round of 16
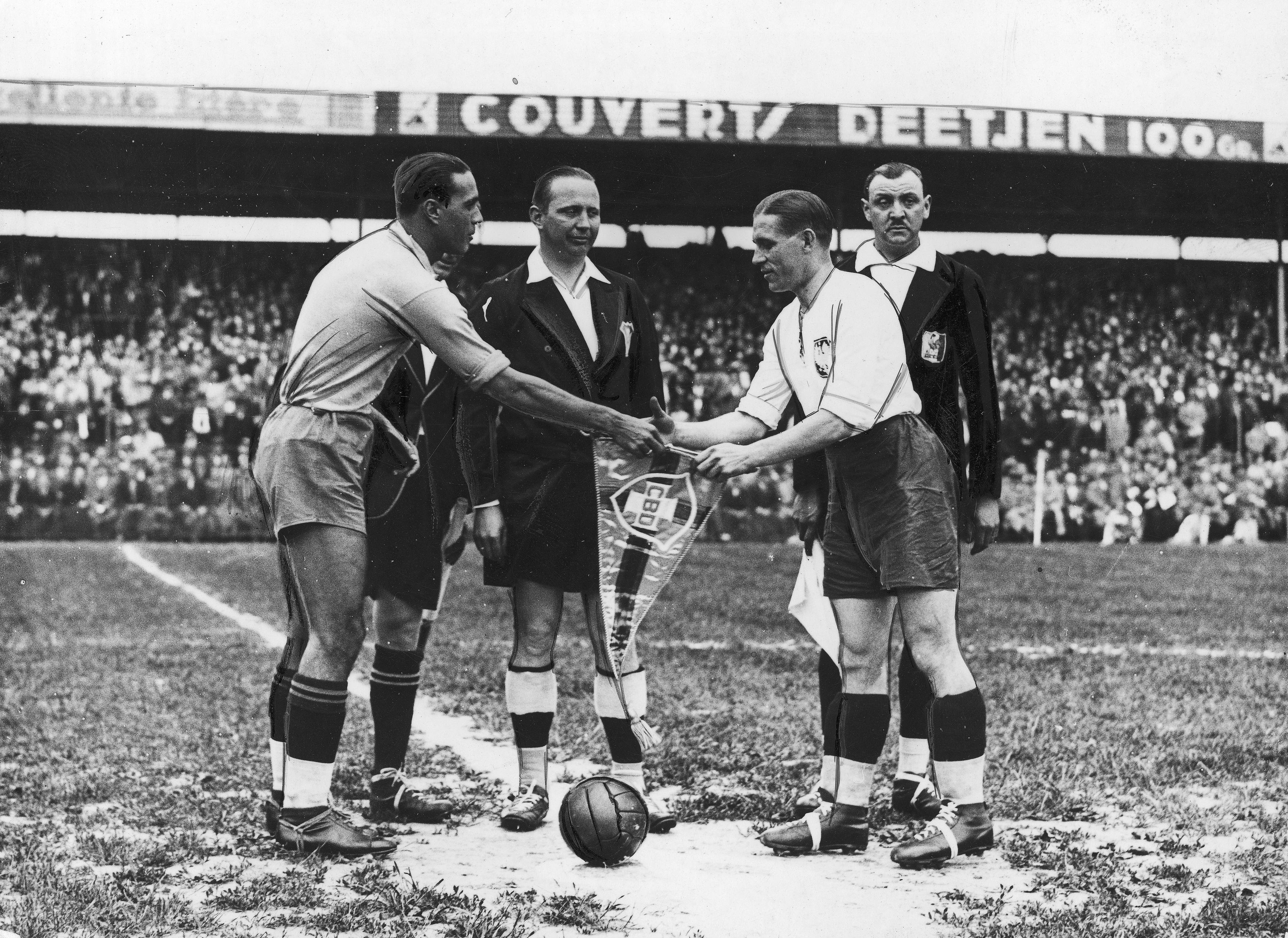
- Exchange of pennants prior to kickoff
Brazil	Poland
(Brazil)	(Poland)
6	5
- After extra time
- Date: 5 June 1938
- Venue: Stade de la Meinau, Strasbourg
- Referee: Ivan Eklind (Sweden)
- Attendance: 13,452

Brazil 6–5 Poland was a football match held during the 1938 FIFA World Cup in France and played at the Stade de la Meinau in Strasbourg. It was the first FIFA World Cup match contested by Poland and also Brazil's highest-scoring match in the tournament. The match held the record for the highest-scoring World Cup match until 1954, when Austria beat Switzerland 7–5.

== Teams ==
=== Brazil ===
All of the players called up by Adhemar Pimenta traveled to France:

- Batatais – goalkeeper (Fluminense)
- Walter – goalkeeper (Flamengo)
- Domingos da Guia – defender (Flamengo)
- Jaú – defender (Corinthians)
- Machado – defendfer (Fluminense)
- Nariz – defender (Botafogo)
- Afonsinho – midfielder (São Cristóvão)
- Argemiro – midfielder (Portuguesa Santista)
- Brandão – midfielder (Corinthians)
- Britto – midfielder (America-RJ)
- Martim – midfielder (Botafogo)
- Zezé Procópio – midfielder (Botafogo)
- Hércules – forward (Fluminense)
- Leônidas – forward (Flamengo)
- Lopes – forward (Corinthians)
- Luisinho – forward (Palestra Italia)
- Niginho – forward (Vasco da Gama)
- Patesko – forward (Botafogo)
- Perácio – forward (Botafogo)
- Roberto – forward (São Cristóvão)
- Romeu Pellicciari – forward (Fluminense)
- Tim – forward (Fluminense)

Out of those, Batatais, Walter, Machado, Argemiro, Lopes, Perácio, Romeu Pellicciari, Hércules and Zezé Procópio had never played any matches for the national team before.

=== Poland ===
To Strasbourg, France, where Poland was going to play its first game versus Brazil (5 June 1938), Kałuża and Spoida took 15 players:

- Ewald Dytko – midfielder (Dąb Katowice),
- Antoni Gałecki – defender (ŁKS Łódź),
- Wilhelm Góra – midfielder (Cracovia),
- Edward Madejski – goalkeeper (not representing any club at that time),
- Erwin Nyc – midfielder (Polonia Warszawa),
- Władysław Szczepaniak – defender (Polonia Warszawa),
- Leonard Piontek – forward (AKS Chorzów),
- Ryszard Piec – forward (Naprzód Lipiny),
- Wilhelm Piec – forward (Naprzód Lipiny),
- Fryderyk Scherfke – forward (Warta Poznań),
- Ernest Wilimowski – forward (Ruch Chorzów),
- Gerard Wodarz – forward (Ruch Chorzów),
- Walter Brom – goalkeeper (Ruch Chorzów),
- Edmund Giemsa – midfielder (Ruch Chorzów),
- Stanisław Baran – midfielder (Warszawianka Warszawa).

On the roster, there were two players who had never before represented Poland – midfielder Stanisław Baran and goalkeeper Walter Brom (who was then 17 years and 4 months old – to this day, Brom is the youngest goalkeeper on FIFA's World Cup list of participants). Seven players stood by:

- Ewald Cebula (Śląsk Świętochłowice),
- Józef Korbas (Cracovia),
- Kazimierz Lis (Warta Poznań),
- Edmund Tworz (Warta Poznań),
- Antoni Łyko (Wisła Kraków)
- Bolesław Habowski (Wisła Kraków),
- Jan Wasiewicz (Pogoń Lwów).

== Preparations ==
=== Brazil ===
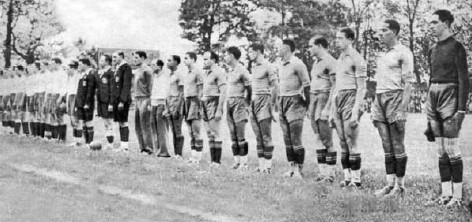
The Brazil team for the match

By 1930s, Brazil was not yet regarded as the world's top team. The team had participated in the two first World Cups, but with lackluster performances and preparations marred by behind-the-scenes infighting: In 1930, the São Paulo football federation fell out with CBD and refused to provide any of its players to the national team, and the Brazilian team, composed solely of players from Rio de Janeiro clubs, was eliminated in the group stage after a loss to Yugoslavia. In 1934, the country's football was undergoing a schism between professionals and amateurs, with CBD on the amateurs' side, and as a result, the squad was composed of Botafogo (the only team of significance that remained amateur) players supplemented with players from professional teams hired by CBD to play on the World Cup. The team once again fell on the first stage, losing to Spain by 3–1.

However, the preparation for 1938 had been calm and free of internal disputes, and the team had qualified to the tournament by default after its opponent, Argentina, withdrew from the qualification. so, Brazil, coming for the first time with maximum strength, was believed to be a very good, high quality team.

As the shirts of both teams at the time were white, Brazil played with its improvised training uniform, without embroidered shields and in a different shade of blue than the shorts. It was the first time that Brazil wore blue in an official match, which would only be repeated in the 1958 final.

=== Poland ===
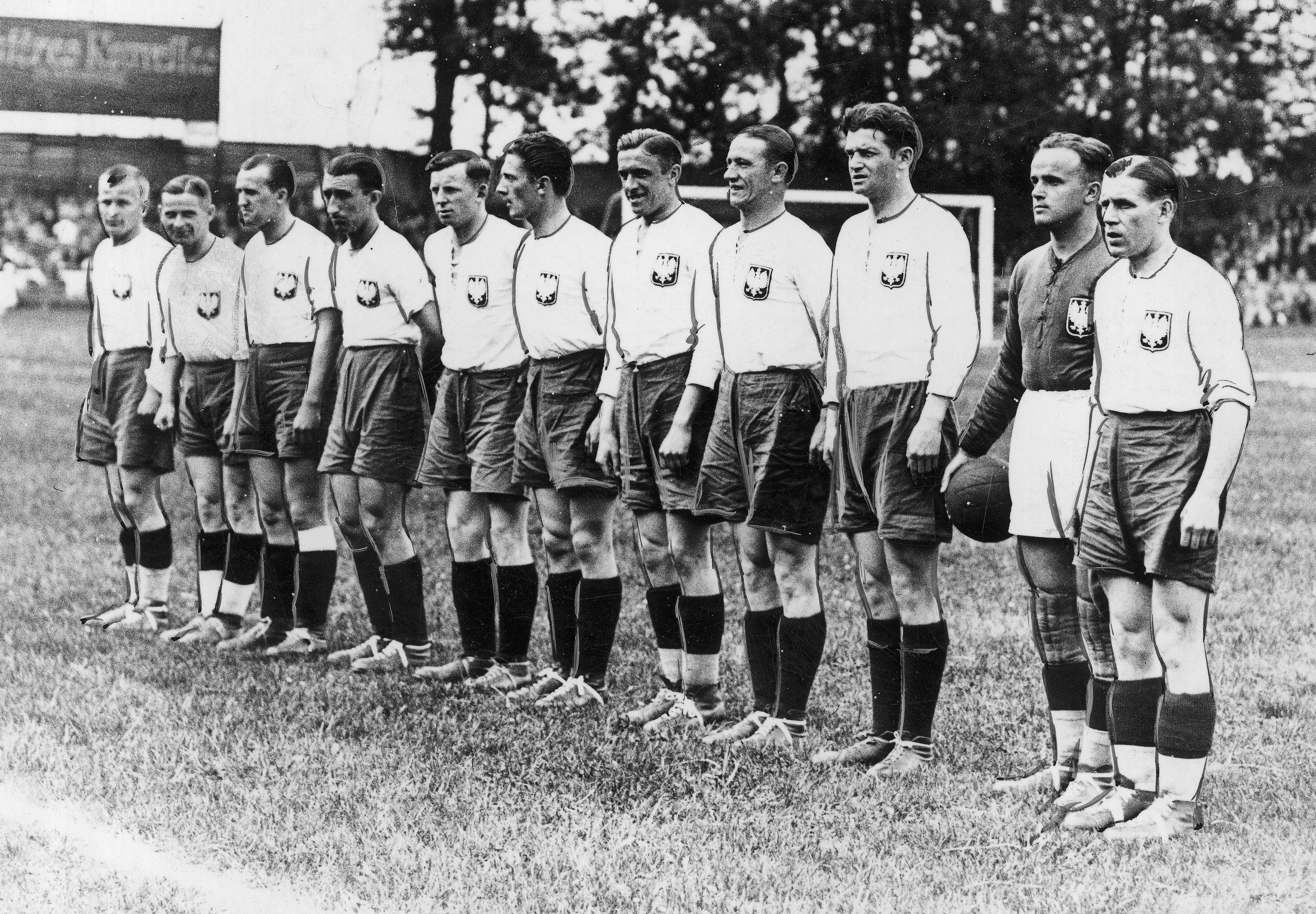
The Polish team

The Polish team, on its end, had played its qualification matches against Yugoslavia. After winning by 4–0 in Warsaw, they lost the return match in Belgrade by 1–0 and advanced on goal difference.

Interesting is the fact that the Polish team was gathered together just a week before the game. This was due to the Polish Football League games – coaches of the teams did not want their best players to leave their sides earlier because in the 1930s, like majority of world's athletes then, most Polish athletes were amateurs – they had to work on a daily basis. Thus, the training camp in Wągrowiec (near Poznań) lasted for a week only – just enough for some players to get acquainted with each other. A few days before the game, the Poles got into the train and went to Strasbourg.

The team that was called up to the World Cup was largely the same as the one that had played in the qualification, with only keeper Adolf Krzyk and striker Jerzy Wostal absent from the final list. by then, relatively few players still remained from the team that had reached fourth place in the 1936 Olympics.

Originally, the game was supposed to take place in Toulouse, in southern France. Polish officials, however, issued a complaint stating that the sweltering heat there would be helpful for the Brazilians, who are used to such weather. The game's location was moved to Strasbourg, but not because of the complaint. There were numerous, last moment corrections before the whole tournament. This was due to complications after the withdrawal of Austria, which after the Anschluss was incorporated into Nazi Germany.

== Match ==
=== Summary ===
==== First half ====
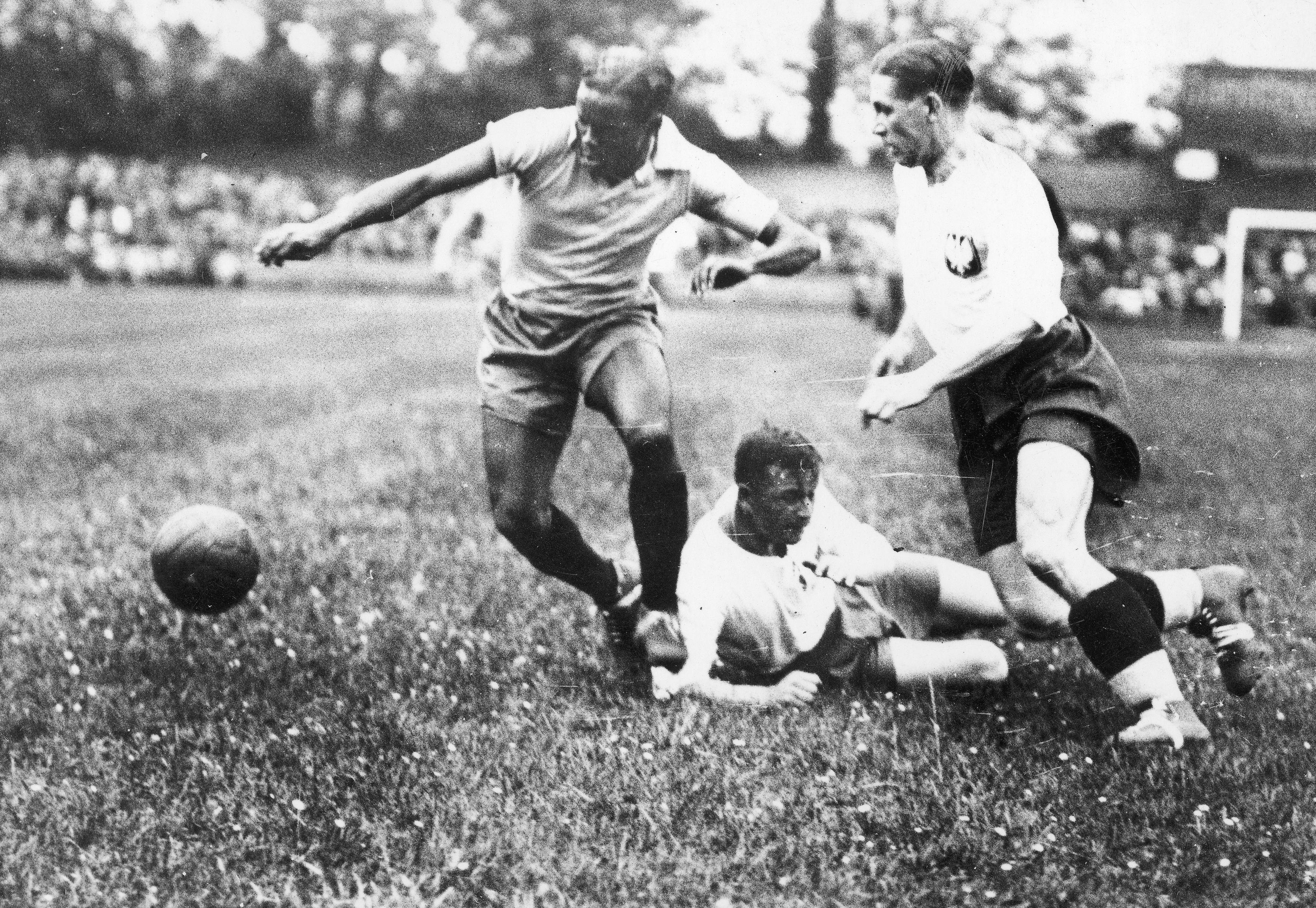
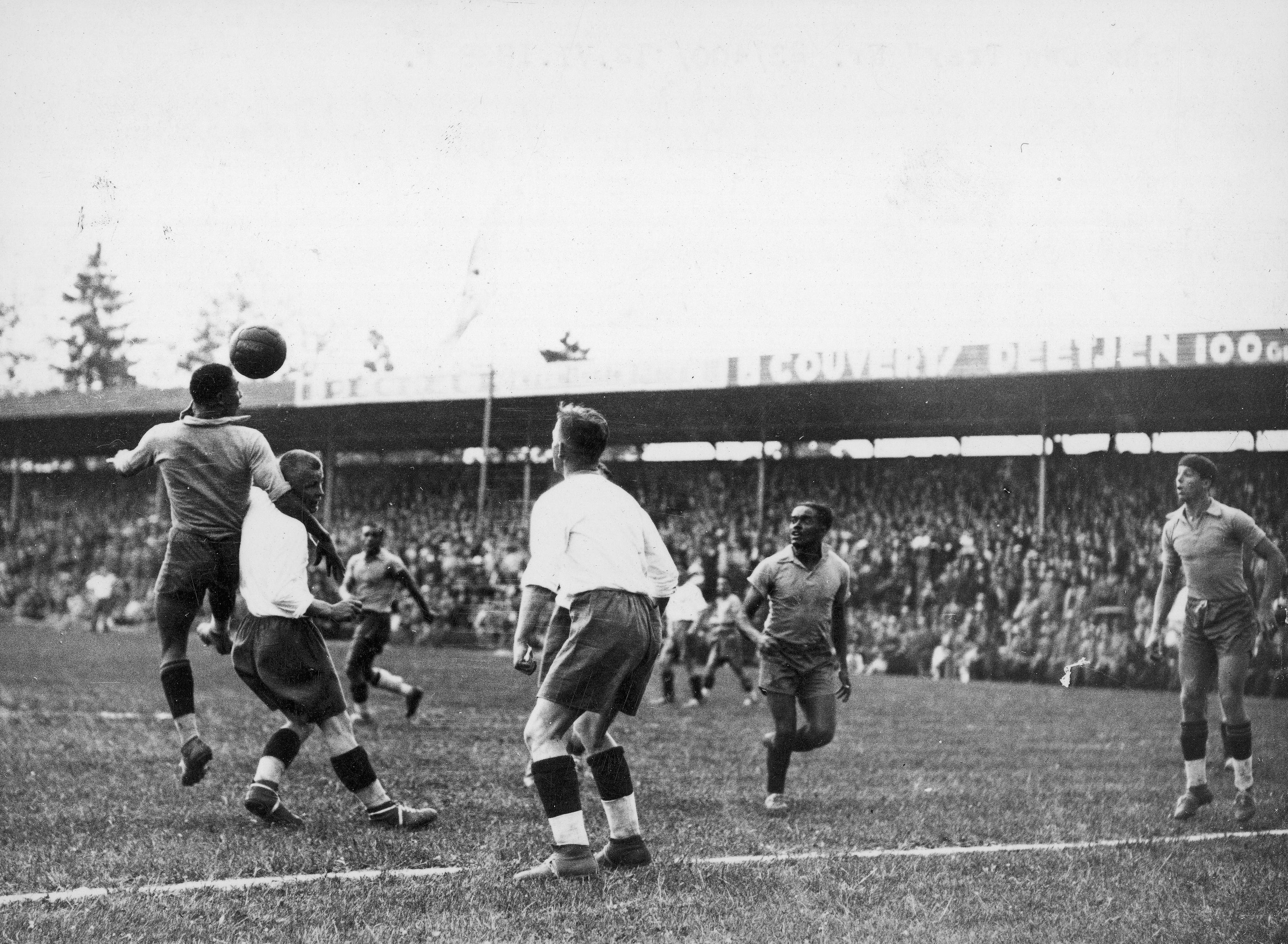
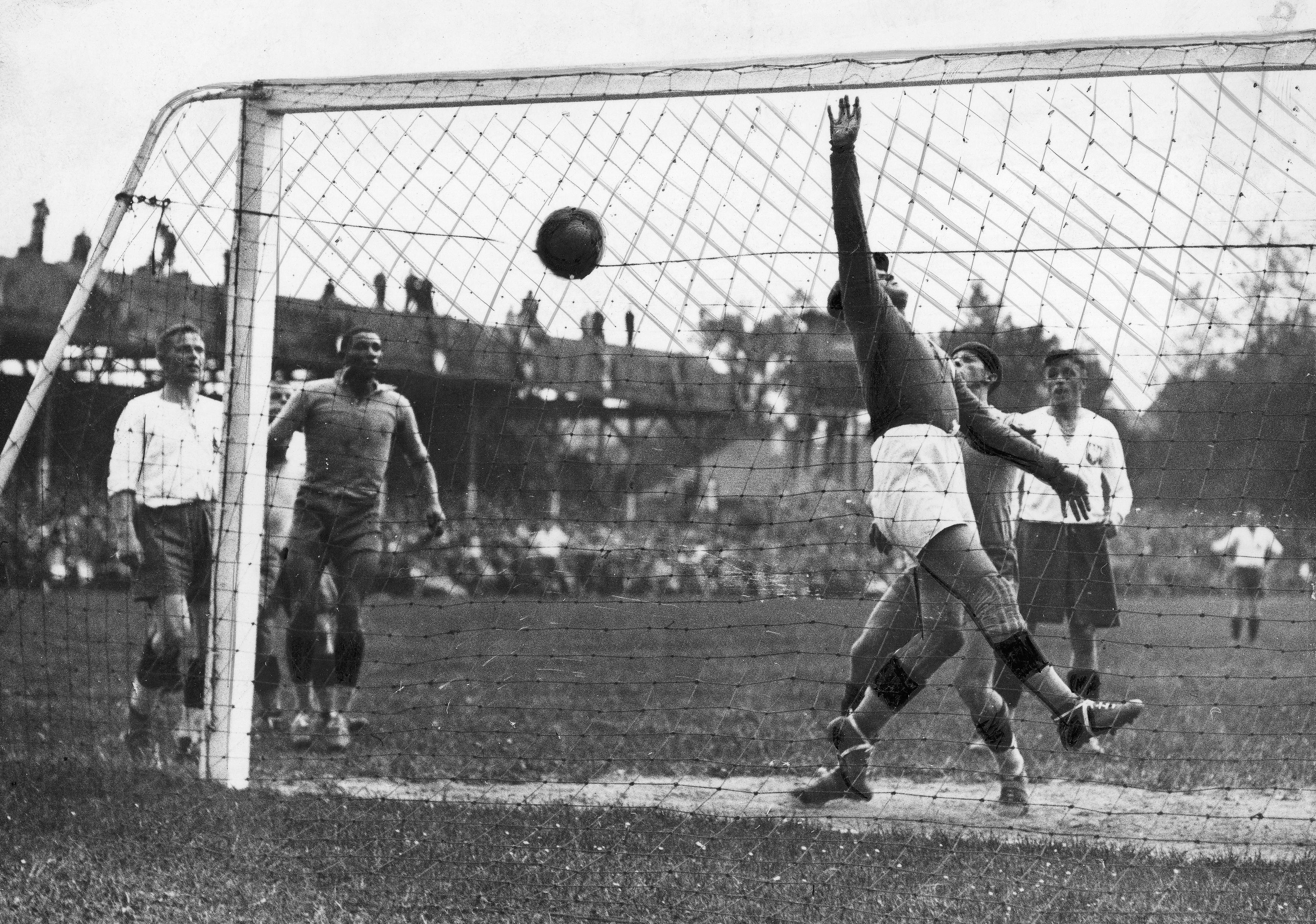
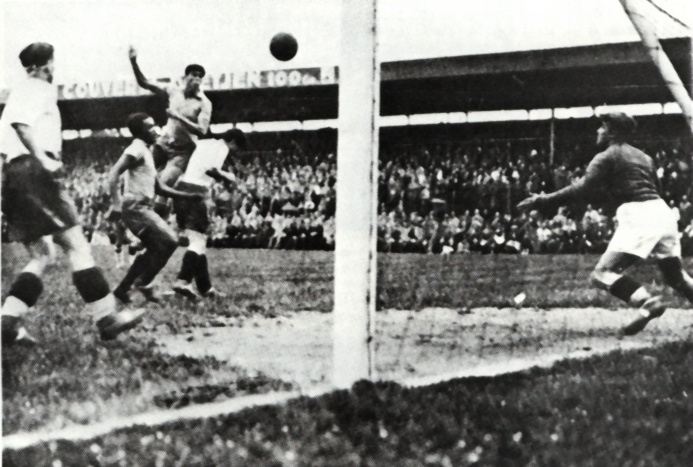
Some moments of the match

At exactly 17:00, Swedish referee Ivan Eklind blew his whistle for the first time. Strasbourg's Stade de la Meinau was filled with some 15,000 fans, including a several thousand group of Poles – mostly immigrants, who worked in coal mines in northern France. Brazilian fans were not numerous, and the French were mostly rooting for exotic team from South America.

Back in those days, teams were mainly concentrated on attack. So it is not surprising that in Kałuża's lineup there were as many as five forwards (Piec, Wilimowski, Wodarz, Piątek and Scherfke). Midfielders were Góra, Nyc and Dytko, and the defenders – only Szczepaniak (captain) and Gałecki. In the goal there was Madejski. Brazil also played with the same scheme, with Batatais on the goal, Domingos da Guia and Machado on the defence, Zezé Procópio, Martim and Affonsinho as midfielders, and as forwards, Lopes, Romeu, Leônidas, Perácio and Hércules.

In 1938, football regulations did not allow any substitutions. As Poland lost this game, which meant immediate elimination, only the 11 players mentioned above were given the chance to appear on the field. Out of the 22 Brazilian players called up, only Niginho who did not play in the following matches.

Little is known about the first goal, which Brazil's Leônidas scored in 18th minute. There was no description of it in Polish press, Polish participants of the game did not remember it, either. However, it was reported that five minutes later, Ernst Wilimowski dribbled past three defenders and Brazilian keeper Batatais. The latter managed to push the Pole to the ground, which meant a penalty kick; it was scored in the 23rd minute by Scherfke, who aimed at the right corner of the goal. This was the first ever goal for Poland at a FIFA World Cup.

==== Second half ====
After the first half, the Brazilians were leading 3–1 via goals by Leônidas, Romeu and Peracio and the Poles were mainly in defense. Half time was the turning point. First of all, Kałuża yelled loudly at his players, then it started to rain. South Americans were having problems on wet, slippery turf, while Wilimowski started his show. In 53rd and then 59th minute, Poland's top-scorer twice beat Batatais, after individual performances, which were described in the press as "circus-like". The score was 3–3.

Soon afterwards, the rain stopped. It was a boost for the Brazilians, who scored a fourth in the 71st minute scored courtesy of Peracio. However, a minute before time Wilimowski scored his third goal, which meant extra time.

==== Extra time ====
After a short break, the Brazilians attacked the Polish goal. Two goals by Leônidas (in the 93rd and 104th minutes) settled the game sent Brazil into a 6–4 lead. Poles, led by amazing Wilimowski, fought back – in the 118th minute he slotted the ball in. During the last minutes, Brazil was desperately defending the result. Even though Wodarz, on a free kick, was close, and then Nyc's shot hit a crossbar, Poland lost 5–6.

Leônidas' goal at the 93rd minute was scored without him wearing the right boot, which was torn, leaving off his foot in the swampy pitch. The goal was given though, as Brazil played the match with black socks and thus (also due to all the mud which covered the pitch resulting of the rain beforehand), the lack of a boot went undetected by the referee.

=== Details ===
5 June 1938
17:00 WEST (UTC+01:00)

Brazil	6–5 (a.e.t.)	Poland
Leônidas 18', 93', 104'; Romeu 25'; Perácio 44', 71'		Scherfke 23' (pen.); Wilimowski 53', 59', 89', 118'

Stade de la Meinau, Strasbourg
Attendance: 13,452
Referee: Ivan Eklind (Sweden)

Brazil
Poland

GK	Batatais
RB	Domingos da Guia
LB	Arthur Machado
RH	Zezé Procópio
CH	Martim (c)
LH	Afonsinho
OR	Lopes
IR	Romeu
CF	Leônidas
IL	José Perácio
OL	Hércules
Manager:
Adhemar Pimenta

GK	Edward Madejski
RB	Antoni Gałecki
LB	Władysław Szczepaniak (c)
RH	Ewald Dytko
CH	Erwin Nyc
LH	Wilhelm Góra
OR	Gerard Wodarz
IR	Ernst Wilimowski
CF	Friedrich Scherfke
IL	Leonard Piątek
OL	Ryszard Piec
Manager:
Józef Kałuża

Linesmen:
Louis Poissant (France)
Ernest Kissenberger (France)

Match rules

- 90 minutes
- 30 minutes of extra time if necessary
- Replay at a later date if scores still level
- No substitutions permitted

== Aftermath ==
The match has some cultural significance in both countries.

For Brazil, they went on to win the match for third place, after losing to the Italians in the semi-finals. The 3rd place occupation by Brazil was seen to be Brazil's greatest football achievement by the time, and helped boosting football's popularity in the country. It was the 1938 edition that Brazil started to rise to become a football superpower, although it took them 20 years to finally win their first World Cup, against the hosts.

It was Poland's first and only World Cup match in the Interwar period. Poland was later invaded by Nazi Germany and Soviet Union a year later, and Poland suffered significant destruction of its sporting developments, including football. Following the end of World War II, the Polish People's Republic was established under Stalin's control. Thus, Polish football did not make any major impact until their return in 1974, where the Poles surprised the whole tournament by achieving third place, by taking vengeance on the Brazilians in their final match. Polish golden generation by then, was born.

Brazil and Poland would meet each other three more times in the FIFA World Cup (1–0 for Poland in 1974, 3–1 to Brazil in 1978 and 4–0 for Brazil in 1986).

== See also ==
- Battle of Bordeaux (1938 FIFA World Cup)
- History of football in Poland
- 1938 FIFA World Cup squads
- Polish football in the interwar period
- Brazil at the FIFA World Cup
- Poland at the FIFA World Cup
