= Ernst Wilimowski =

Polish and German footballer (1916–1997)

Ernest Wilimowski
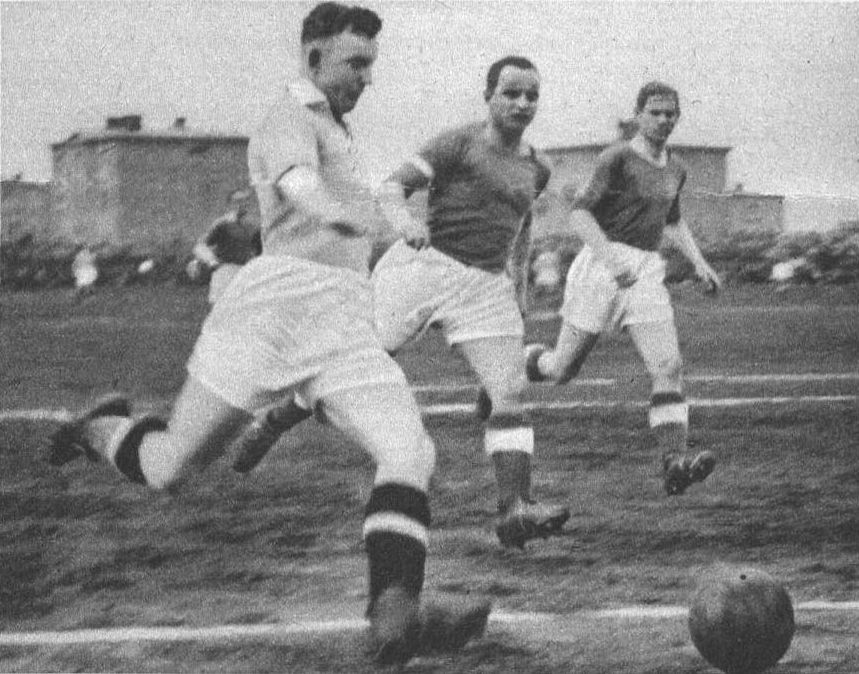
- Wilimowski (front, with ball) in a 1937 match for Ruch Chorzów against Warta Poznań.

Personal information
- Full name: Ernest Otto Wilimowski
- Birth name: Ernst Otto Prandella
- Date of birth: 23 June 1916
- Place of birth: Kattowitz, Kingdom of Prussia, German Empire
- Date of death: 30 August 1997 (aged 81)
- Place of death: Karlsruhe, Germany
- Position: Forward

Senior career*
Years	Team	Apps	(Gls)
1932–1933	1. FC Kattowitz	25	(15)
1934–1939	Ruch Chorzów	86	(113)
1939–1940	1. FC Kattowitz		
1940–1942	PSV Chemnitz	29+	(68)
1942–1944	1860 Munich	5	(8)
1944	1. FC Kattowitz	1	(2)
1944	Karlsruher SC	4	(6)
1944–1945	PSV Chemnitz	3+	(14)
1946	SC Zwiesel	4+	(4+)
1946–1948	SG Chemnitz-West	27	(65)
1948	BC Augsburg	6	(3)
1949–1950	Offenburger FV	18	(18)
1950–1951	FC Singen 04	30	(16)
1951–1955	VfR Kaiserslautern	75+	(73)
1955–1956	Kehler FV	7	(8)
Total		328+	(413+)

International career
1934–1939	Poland	22	(21)
1934–1939	Silesia	6	(7)
1941–1942	Germany	8	(13)
- * Club domestic league appearances and goals

Ernest Otto Wilimowski (German: Ernst Otto Wilimowski, born Ernst Otto Prandella; 23 June 1916 – 30 August 1997), nicknamed "Ezi", was a Polish and German footballer who played as a forward. Willimowski had a career spanned nearly a quarter of a century in both countries, Poland and Germany, and was capped for their respective national teams.

According to RSSSF, he scored at least 683 goals in 484 official games, making him the 17th greatest goalscorer of all time, and over 1077 total goals including friendlies. He is the most prolific goalscorer in official matches in one season in recorded history according to RSSSF, with 107 goals scored in 45 matches. Wilimowski was the first player to score four goals in a single FIFA World Cup game.

Wilimowski also occasionally played ice hockey for the team Pogoń Katowice.

== Early life ==
Born in Kattowitz (Katowice), Prussian Silesia, German Empire, Wilimowski was raised in a Silesian family, typical of the Upper Silesian Polish-German borderland. After eastern Upper Silesia became part of Poland in 1922, he became a citizen of the Second Polish Republic.

His parents, Ernst-Roman and Paulina, were German. His father, a soldier for the German Empire, died on the Western Front in the First World War. His mother sent him to a German kindergarten, a German primary school and, when he was nine years old, to the German football team 1. FC Kattowitz. At the age of 13, he was legally adopted by his stepfather, who was Polish, and took on the surname Wilimowski. At home, he spoke German for the most part, while in public he often spoke a Silesian dialect of the Polish language. Officially a citizen of Poland, he referred to himself as an Upper Silesian ("Górnoślązak" - Oberschlesier).

== Early career ==
=== Ruch Chorzów ===
Wilimowski, who had six toes on his right foot, played on the left side as a forward and showed himself to be a very skilled dribbler as well as a natural goalscorer. He began his career with the ethnically German club 1. FC Kattowitz, then in 1933 at the age of 17, moved to Polish side Ruch Wielkie Hajduki, today known as Ruch Chorzów. "Ezi" quickly established himself as the team's best player: in his first season he scored 33 goals to lead the league. His first Ekstraklasa game took place on 8 April 1934 and a few weeks later, he was capped for the Poland national team. With a number of excellent footballers besides Wilimowski (like Teodor Peterek and Gerard Wodarz), Ruch dominated Polish football and was the league champion in 1933–1936 and 1938.

Wilimowski played 88 games for Ruch, scoring 115 goals, and was the league's top scorer in 1934 and 1936. He also led the league in scoring in 1939 until the German invasion of Poland. On 21 May 1939, he scored 10 goals in a single match against Union Touring Łódź as his club won 12–1. That performance still stands as a league record.

=== Poland national team ===
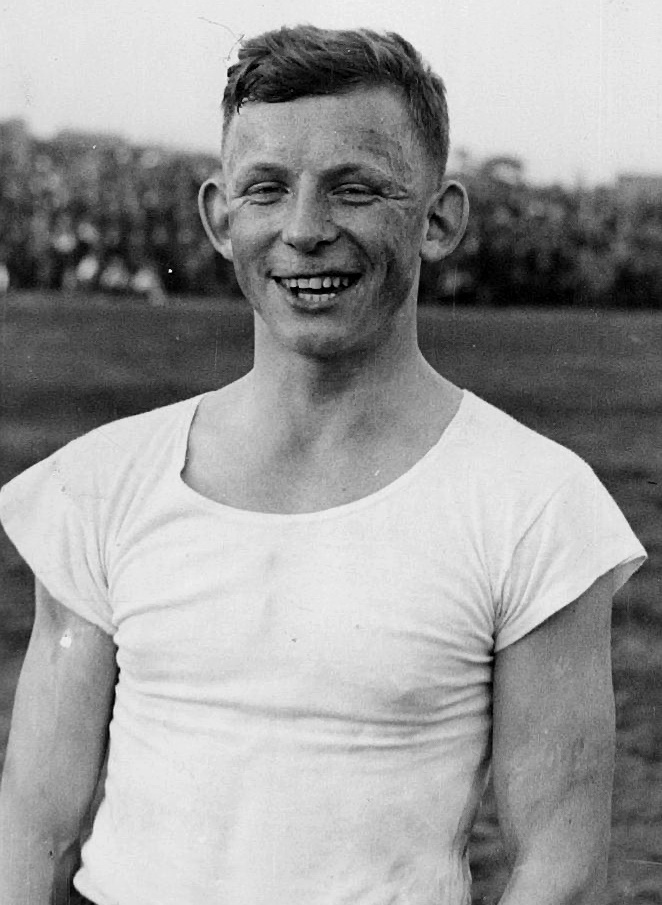
Ernest Wilimowski 1936

Soon after beginning his club football career, "Ezi" earned his first cap for Poland when he debuted against Denmark in Copenhagen on 21 May 1934 in a 4–2 loss: he was just 17 years and 332 days old. In a total of 22 appearances for Poland, Wilimowski netted 21 goals, nearly a goal per game. However, his off field conduct was less than ideal and in 1936 the young man's penchant for drinking and partying led to a one-year suspension imposed by the Polish football association just before the Olympic Games in Berlin. Without his goal scoring touch the Poles managed only a fourth-place finish in the Olympic tournament.

Wilimowski's appearances for Poland include two performances that were both historic and memorable. In a match against Brazil played in Strasbourg, France during the 1938 FIFA World Cup, "Ezi" put on a stunning display by becoming the first player ever to score four goals in a single World Cup match. His continued attacks on the opposition net also drew a penalty as he was fouled to the ground by Brazilian keeper Batatais, which led to Poland's fifth goal scored from the spot by German-born Fritz Scherfke, from Poznań. However, it was not enough — Poland lost the match 6–5 and was eliminated from the tournament. Wilimowski's record was later equalled by other players, but was bettered only 56 years later, when Oleg Salenko scored five goals against Cameroon during the 1994 FIFA World Cup. It still remains the only World Cup match when a player from the losing side scored four goals. Wilimowski put on another memorable display on 27 August 1939 in Warsaw in an international friendly against what was then one of the best teams in the world — Hungary, the 1938 World Cup runner-up. After 33 minutes of play the Hungarians were ahead 2–0. Wilimowski scored three goals and again drew a penalty through his attacking play which was converted by teammate Leonard Piątek, giving Poland a 4–2 win. The match was the last game played before the start of World War II just four days later.

== War years ==
After the invasion and occupation of Poland by Nazi Germany, Wilimowski as Volksdeutscher re-took German citizenship, like the majority of the inhabitants of the Eastern part of Upper Silesia, among them all the players of the Poland national team coming from this region. It allowed them to continue their football careers as Poles were not permitted to participate in sports under the Nazi occupation. In the early days of the war Wilimowski had to hide from the Nazis because of the enmity of a local Kreisleiter (county leader) of the NSDAP Georg Joschke who held against Wilimowski the 1933 transfer from the ethnically-German club 1. FC Kattowitz to the Polish Ruch Chorzów. Allegedly, Joschke threatened that Wilimowski would have to wear the letter "P" (for Pole) on his clothes. This never happened, as Wilimowski was too good a player and well appreciated by other German football officials. However, his mother Paulina, was placed in Auschwitz concentration camp, which she survived. Wilimowski's mother was incarcerated because she got engaged in an intimate relationship with a Russian Jew, which was regarded as Rassenschande in Nazi Germany. Ernst, who in later stages of the war became friends with legendary pilot Hermann Graf, managed to save her, with Graf's help.

For propaganda purposes, Nazi sports officials made 1. FC Kattowitz a model side representative of the German Upper Silesia. The region's best players were assigned to the team and besides Wilimowski included Erwin Nyc, Ewald Dytko and Paweł Cyganek. "Ezi" played there until February 1940, before moving on to Chemnitz, where he took up a job as a policeman while playing for the local team Polizei-Sportverein Chemnitz (1940–1942).

Through the course of the war, he also played for TSV 1860 Munich (1942–1944), where he was a member of the Tschammerpokal (German Cup) winning side of 1942 setting a record of 14 goals in the tournament. His record still stands. In the final game of the 1942 German Cup, at the Olympic Stadium in Berlin, the Munich side won 2–0, with the first goal scored by Wilimowski. In the final years of the war, Wilimowski became a soldier of the Wehrmacht, but he was allowed to play in army football teams in German-occupied Kraków.

=== Germany national team ===
Like other officials, Sepp Herberger, manager of the Germany national team, developed an immediate appreciation for Wilimowski's talent. He debuted for Germany against Romania on 1 June 1941, in Bucharest scoring twice in a 4–1 victory. He followed that performance with three goals against Finland in Helsinki on 5 October 1941 as the Germans scored an easy 6–0 win.

The only international match Wilimowski ever played in his native Upper Silesia (in Beuthen, now Bytom, Poland), whether wearing a Polish or German jersey, was on 16 August 1942 versus the Romanian side. He contributed one goal in a 7–0 win (another German star, Fritz Walter, netted three goals in the contest). The match was the biggest sporting event staged there during the war as 55,000 fans came to cheer on their native son.

Wilimowski's most memorable performance for the Germany national side came on 18 October 1942 in Bern, Switzerland as the Germans defeated a well-respected Swiss national team by a score of 5-3. "Ezi" scored four of five goals with the other being netted by Fritz Walter.

Wilimowski was capped a total of eight times for Germany, scoring 13 goals (1.63 per match). His last appearance for Germany was in a 5–2 victory over Slovakia in Bratislava on 22 November 1942. After this match, Germany no longer played international friendlies because of the war.

== Postwar career ==
After the war, Wilimowski, who was regarded by the Polish government as a traitor, was not allowed to visit his Silesian homeland during the Communist regime. He was with SG Chemnitz-West in 1946-47 and had a short spell with RC Strasbourg in 1949. After that, he settled in the Karlsruhe area, opening a restaurant there. Even though he was already in his 30s when organized playing resumed, he continued a career that lasted until 1957 and age 41. During this period he played for several German club teams including TSV Detmold (in between seasons, no league appearances), FV Offenburg (as a player-coach), BC Augsburg for a short spell in the autumn of 1948, Singen 04, where he had a good comeback scoring 16 Oberliga goals in 1950-51, and VfR Kaiserslautern (including at least 71 goals in Oberliga Südwest appearances for the latter, all scored when he was over 35 years old).

At the 1974 FIFA World Cup in Germany, Wilimowski allegedly wanted to pay a visit to the Poland national team that stayed in Murrhardt near Stuttgart, but was refused permission by PZPN officials. Legendary coach of the Poland national team, Kazimierz Górski, met Wilimowski at a hotel in Murrhardt during the World Cup in 1974. Gorski immediately recognized Ezi, because in the interbellum period, Wilimowski was one of his idols. Whenever Ruch Chorzow came to play in Lwów (now Lviv), Gorski always attended the games, watching Wilimowski. The Polish coach greeted his idol very coldly: Mr Wilimowski, if you had not done anything wrong, perhaps you should have come back to Poland, and explain your behavior, cleanse yourself of all charges - said Górski. I was afraid - answered Wilimowski.

After retiring, together with wife, Wilimowski for a while ran a restaurant, then worked in a Pfaff sewing machine factory, to retire in 1978. He died in Karlsruhe, Germany, leaving behind four children - three daughters (Sylvia, Sigrid and Ulle) and a son, Rainer

== Career statistics ==
=== Club ===
Appearances and goals by club, season, and competition. Only official games are included in this table.
Club	Season	League			National cup		Other		Total	
Club	Season	Division	Apps	Goals	Apps	Goals	Apps	Goals	Apps	Goals
1. FC Kattowitz	1932–33	Liga Oberschlesien	25	15	–		1	2	26	17
1. FC Kattowitz	1944	Gauliga Oberschlesien	1	2	–		–		1	2
1. FC Kattowitz	Total		26	17	–		1	2	27	19
Ruch Chorzów	1934	Ekstraklasa	15+	33	–		–		15+	33
Ruch Chorzów	1935	Ekstraklasa	5+	8	–		–		5+	8
Ruch Chorzów	1936	Ekstraklasa	10+	19	–		–		10+	19
Ruch Chorzów	1937	Ekstraklasa	7+	8	–		–		7+	8
Ruch Chorzów	1938	Ekstraklasa	10+	19	–		–		10+	19
Ruch Chorzów	1939	Ekstraklasa	9+	26	–		–		9+	26
Ruch Chorzów	Total		56+	113	–		–		56+	113
PSV Chemnitz	1940–41	Gauliga Sachsen	21	35	2	2 (Note: Appearances in the 1940 Tschammerpokal, from August 1940 to December 1940.)	13 (Note: Appearances in Chemnitz District summer war tournament)	41	36	78
PSV Chemnitz	1941–42	Gauliga Sachsen	14+	32	1+	1	–		15+	33
PSV Chemnitz	1943–44	Gauliga Sachsen	2+	9	–		–		2+	9
PSV Chemnitz	1944–45	Gauliga Sachsen	1+	5	–		–		1+	5
PSV Chemnitz	Total		38	82	3	3	13	41	54	126
1860 Munich	1942–43	Gauliga Bayern	5	8	4	14 (Note: Appearances in the 1942 Tschammerpokal, from July 1942 to November 1942.)	–		9	22
Karlsruher SC	1943–44	Gauliga Baden	4	6	0	0	–		4	6
SC Zwiesel	1946–47	1.Liga Niederbayern	4+	4+	–		–		4+	4+
Chemnitz-West	1946–48	Bezirkliga Chemnitz	27	65	–		–		27	65
BC Augsburg	1948–49	Oberliga Süd	6	3	–		–		6	3
Offenburger FV	1949–50	Oberliga Südwest	18	18	–		–		18	18
FC Singen 04	1950–51	Oberliga Süd	30	16	–		–		30	16
VfR Kaiserslautern	1951–52	Oberliga Südwest	16+	23	–		–		16+	23
VfR Kaiserslautern	1952–53	Oberliga Südwest	29	34	–		–		29	34
VfR Kaiserslautern	1953–54	Oberliga Südwest	24	14	–		–		24	14
VfR Kaiserslautern	1954–55	Oberliga Südwest	6	2	–		–		6	2
VfR Kaiserslautern	Total		75+	73	–		–		75+	73
Kehler FV	1955–56	2 Amat. Liga Südbaden	7	8	–		–		7	8
Career total			296+	413+	7+	17 (Note: Only seven appearances and 17 goals are recognized as official matches and goals by the DFB for the German Cup, the remaining matches and goals being from regional preliminary qualifying tournaments for this competition.)	14	43	317+	473+

=== International ===
Appearances and goals by national team and year
National team	Year	Apps	Goals
Poland	1934	5	3
Poland	1935	0	0
Poland	1936	1	0
Poland	1937	4	3
Poland	1938	8	10
Poland	1939	4	5
Germany	1941	4	6
Germany	1942	4	7
Total		30	34

- Wilimowski's team's score listed first, score column indicates score after each Wilimowski goal.

International goals by Ernst Wiimowski
No.	Date	Venue	Opponent	Score	Result	Competition
For Poland
1	May 23, 1934	Stockholm Olympic Stadium, Stockholm, Sweden	Sweden	2–2	2–4	Friendly
2	August 26, 1934	Stadion SK Jugoslavija, Belgrade, Yugoslavia	Yugoslavia	1–3	1–4	Friendly
3	September 9, 1934	Stadion Wojska Polskiego, Warsaw, Poland	Germany	1–1	2–5	Friendly
4	June 23, 1937	Stadion Wojska Polskiego, Warsaw, Poland	Sweden	3–0	3–1	Friendly
5	September 12, 1937	Stadion Wojska Polskiego, Warsaw, Poland	Denmark	1–0	3–1	Friendly
6	October 10, 1937	Stadion Wojska Polskiego, Warsaw, Poland	Yugoslavia	4–0	4–0	1938 FIFA World Cup qualification
7	March 13, 1938	Hardturm, Zurich, Switzerland	Switzerland	1–0	3–3	Friendly
8	May 22, 1938	Stadion Wojska Polskiego, Warsaw, Poland	Republic of Ireland	5–0	6–0	Friendly
9	June 5, 1938	Stade de la Meinau, Strasbourg, France	Brazil	2–3	5–6 (a.e.t.)	1938 FIFA World Cup
10	June 5, 1938	Stade de la Meinau, Strasbourg, France	Brazil	3–3	5–6 (a.e.t.)	1938 FIFA World Cup
11	June 5, 1938	Stade de la Meinau, Strasbourg, France	Brazil	4–4	5–6 (a.e.t.)	1938 FIFA World Cup
12	June 5, 1938	Stade de la Meinau, Strasbourg, France	Brazil	5–6	5–6 (a.e.t.)	1938 FIFA World Cup
13	September 25, 1938	Stadion Wojska Polskiego, Warsaw, Poland	Yugoslavia	2–0	4–4	1938 King Peter II Cup
14	September 25, 1938	Stadion Wojska Polskiego, Warsaw, Poland	Yugoslavia	4–4	4–4	1938 King Peter II Cup
15	October 23, 1938	Stadion Wojska Polskiego, Warsaw, Poland	Norway	2–2	2–2	Friendly
16	November 13, 1938	Dalymount Park, Dublin, Republic of Ireland	Republic of Ireland	1–2	2–3	Friendly
17	May 27, 1939	Stadion Miejski ŁKS, Łódź, Poland	Belgium	1–0	3–3	Friendly
18	May 27, 1939	Stadion Miejski ŁKS, Łódź, Poland	Belgium	2–0	3–3	Friendly
19	August 27, 1939	Stadion Wojska Polskiego, Warsaw, Poland	Hungary	1–2	4–2	Friendly
20	August 27, 1939	Stadion Wojska Polskiego, Warsaw, Poland	Hungary	2–2	4–2	Friendly
21	August 27, 1939	Stadion Wojska Polskiego, Warsaw, Poland	Hungary	4–2	4–2	Friendly
For Germany
22	June 1, 1941	Stadionul ONEF, Bucharest, Romania	Romania	1–0	4–1	Friendly
23	June 1, 1941	Stadionul ONEF, Bucharest, Romania	Romania	4–0	4–1	Friendly
24	June 15, 1941	Praterstadion, Vienna, Germany	Croatia	4–1	5–1	Friendly
25	October 5, 1941	Helsinki Olympic Stadium, Helsinki, Finland	Finland	2–0	6–0	Friendly
26	October 5, 1941	Helsinki Olympic Stadium, Helsinki, Finland	Finland	5–0	6–0	Friendly
27	October 5, 1941	Helsinki Olympic Stadium, Helsinki, Finland	Finland	6–0	6–0	Friendly
28	August 16, 1942	Hinderburg Stadium, Beuthen, Germany	Romania	7–0	7–0	Friendly
29	October 18, 1942	Wankdorf Stadium, Bern, Switzerland	Switzerland	1–0	5–3	Friendly
30	October 18, 1942	Wankdorf Stadium, Bern, Switzerland	Switzerland	2–1	5–3	Friendly
31	October 18, 1942	Wankdorf Stadium, Bern, Switzerland	Switzerland	3–2	5–3	Friendly
32	October 18, 1942	Wankdorf Stadium, Bern, Switzerland	Switzerland	4–2	5–3	Friendly
33	November 22, 1942	Adolf-Hitler-Kampfbahn, Stuttgart, Germany	Croatia	3–0	5–1	Friendly
34	November 22, 1942	Adolf-Hitler-Kampfbahn, Stuttgart, Germany	Croatia	4–0	5–1	Friendly

== Honours ==
Ruch Wielkie Hajduki

- Ekstraklasa: 1934, 1935, 1936, 1938

TSV 1860 Munich

- Tschammerpokal: 1942

Individual

- Ekstraklasa top scorer: 1934, 1936, 1939
- Tschammerpokal top scorer: 1942

== Literature ==
- Karl-Heinz Harke, Georg Kachel; Fußball – Sport ohne Grenzen. Die Lebensgeschichte des Fußball-Altnationalspielers Ernst Willimowski., Dülmen, Laumann-Verlag 1996, ISBN 3-87466-259-4
- Thomas Urban: Schwarze Adler, weiße Adler. Deutsche und polnische Fußballer im Räderwerk der Politik. Göttingen 2011, pp. 28–48.

== See also ==
- List of men's footballers with 500 or more goals
- List of footballers who achieved hat-trick records
- List of world association football records
