= Paweł Cyganek =

Polish footballer (1913–1995)

Personal information
- Date of birth: 4 October 1913
- Place of birth: Nowa Wieś, German Empire
- Date of death: 11 September 1995 (aged 81)
- Place of death: Ruda Śląska, Poland
- Position: Forward

Youth career
- 1930–1931: Wawel Wirek

Senior career*
Years	Team	Apps	(Gls)
1931–1939	Wawel Wirek		
1939	Fablok Chrzanów		
- WSV Antonienhütte
- 1. FC Kattowitz
- Spójnia Katowice
- Fablok Chrzanów
- Otmęt Krapkowice

International career
1939	Poland	1	(0)
- * Club domestic league appearances and goals

Paweł Cyganek (4 October 1913 – 11 September 1995) was a Polish footballer who played as a forward. In 1939, he made his sole appearance for the Poland national team. Cyganek was born in Wirek, a district of the Upper Silesian city of Ruda Śląska. From early childhood he loved soccer and was a very fast runner, so at age 14 he became a forward on the local team Wawel Wirek.

In the 1930s, Wawel played in Silesian A-Class, the strongest regional league in Poland (in interwar Poland, A-Class was equivalent of today's I liga). Cyganek was widely regarded as too good for this division, drawing interest from top division teams. Among these were Śląsk Świętochłowice, Ruch Chorzów and Cracovia.

Their offers were refused, but finally, at the beginning of 1939, he decided to move to Fablok Chrzanów, another A-Class team, from the Kraków region. In 1939, his team won Kraków's qualifiers, which allowed it to play in inter-regional games for promotion to the top flight. On the way, however, Fablok lost to Śląsk Świętochłowice. Cyganek, who was making good money with Fablok, was feeling good there, improving his play virtually every day. After a Kraków – Upper Silesia 4–1 game (mid-1939), his class was noticed by Józef Kałuża, who called him to the national team.

== Lone game for the Poland national team ==
On 27 August 1939 in Warsaw, Poland faced Hungary. Cyganek was among the starters, sidelining Gerard Wodarz, one of the best left wingers in Poland.

The game against Hungary was a big success for the Poles, as they beat the 1938 World Cup runners-up 4–2. Apart from Ernest Wilimowski, Leonard Piątek and Ewald Dytko, Cyganek, a debutant, was regarded as the best player on the field. Chrzanów's player was hoping for more such games and looking forward to the 1940 Olympic Games in Tokyo, but his plans were brutally thwarted on 1 September, when with the German attack on Poland, World War II began.

== German occupation ==
In late autumn 1939, Germans decided to reopen soccer games in occupied Upper Silesia. Cyganek, who in the meantime had returned to Wirek, started playing for the German-sponsored team Winter Sport-Verein Antonienhutte (formerly Wawel Wirek). He supposedly lost none of his class, as was noticed by Sepp Herberger, manager of the Germany national team. However, the player was soon kicked out by Herberger, because he continued to speak Polish.

== End of career ==
In early 1945, after the Red Army poured into Upper Silesia, Cyganek started to organize football matches under new, Communist authorities. Soon afterwards, Fablok's officials got in touch with him, so he returned to Chrzanów. He spent several years there, finishing his career in 1955 as a defender of Otmęt Krapkowice. Afterwards, he became a coach of several teams such as Pogoń Zabrze, Urania Ruda Śląska and Wawel Wirek.

Cyganek died in 1995 in Wirek.

== See also ==
- The Last Game (27 August 1939)
