= 1938 FIFA World Cup qualification Group 2 =

1938 FIFA World Cup qualification Group 2 is split into:

- 1938 FIFA World Cup qualification Group 2a
- 1938 FIFA World Cup qualification Group 2b
