= Jan Pająk =

Polish footballer

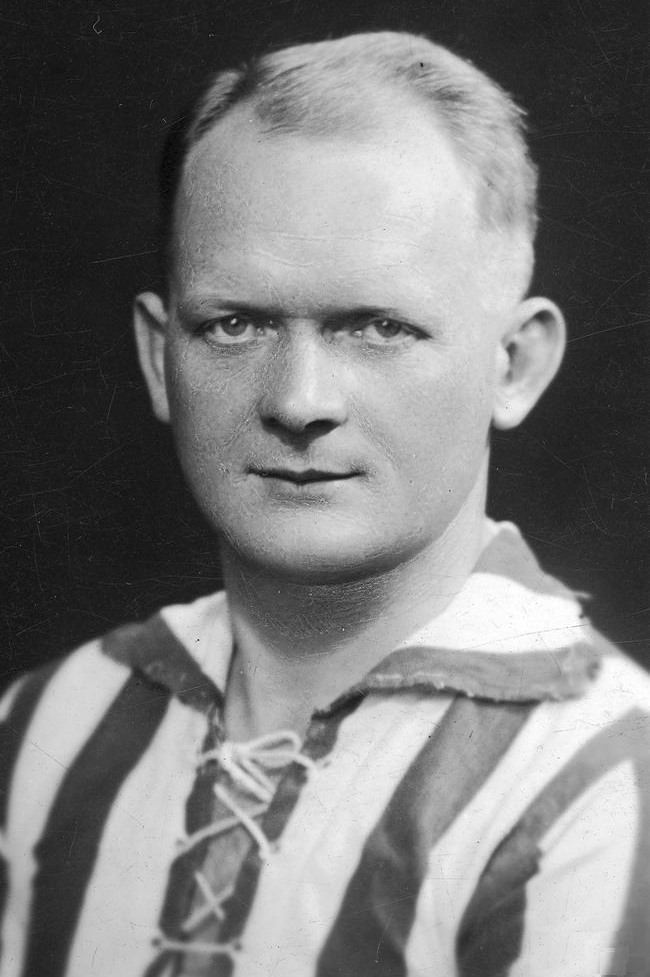

Personal information
- Full name: Jan Roman Pająk
- Date of birth: 12 May 1906
- Place of birth: Jasło, Poland
- Date of death: 1 November 1976 (aged 70)
- Place of death: Kraków, Poland
- Height: 1.78 m (5 ft 10 in)
- Position: Defender

Senior career*
Years	Team	Apps	(Gls)
1921–1930	Czarni Jasło		
1930–1931	Lechia Lwów	21	(2)
1932–1939	Cracovia	119	(9)

International career
1933–1934	Poland	2	(0)
- * Club domestic league appearances and goals

Jan Roman Pająk (12 May 1906 – 1 November 1976) was a Polish footballer who played as a defender. He played in two matches for the Poland national team from 1933 to 1934.

== Honours ==
Cracovia

- Ekstraklasa: 1932, 1937
