= Ivan Stevović =

Yugoslav footballer

Personal information
- Date of birth: 6 September 1910
- Place of birth: Belgrade, Kingdom of Serbia
- Date of death: 4 February 1999 (aged 88)
- Place of death: Belgrade, FR Yugoslavia

Senior career*
Years	Team	Apps	(Gls)
- BUSK
1933–1939	BSK	67	(8)
1939–1944	Jedinstvo Beograd		

International career
1933–1939	Yugoslavia	5	(1)

Managerial career
- 1956–1957: Apollon Athens
- 1957–1958: Aris Thessaloniki
- 1958–1960: Zamalek
- 1962–1963: Niki Volos
- 1967–1968: Panelefsiniakos
- 1968–1969: Kastoria
- * Club domestic league appearances and goals

Ivan Stevović (6 September 1910 – 4 February 1999) was a Yugoslav footballer. He played in five matches for the Yugoslavia national football team from 1933 to 1939 and was also named in Yugoslavia's squad for the Group 3 qualification tournament for the 1938 FIFA World Cup.

He worked as a football coach, in Serbia, Zamalek of Egypt, Kuwait and Greece, including Apollon Athens (1956–57), Aris Thessaloniki (1956–57 and 1957–58), Niki Volos (1962–63) and Panelefsiniakos (1968-69).

He died on February 4, 1999, in Belgrade.

== Honours ==
=== Manager ===
Zamalek

- Egyptian Premier League: 1959–60
- Egypt Cup: 1957–58 1958–59, 1959–60
