= Władysław Pawłowski =

Polish footballer

Personal information
- Date of birth: 19 August 1915
- Place of birth: Kraków, Austria-Hungary
- Date of death: 1 July 1992 (aged 76)
- Place of death: Kraków, Poland
- Height: 1.79 m (5 ft 10 in)
- Position: Goalkeeper

Senior career*
Years	Team	Apps	(Gls)
1929–1934	Polonia Kraków		
1935–1945	Cracovia		

International career
1937	Poland	2	(0)
- * Club domestic league appearances and goals

Władysław Pawłowski (19 August 1915 – 1 July 1992) was a Polish footballer who played as a goalkeeper.

He earned two caps for the Poland national team in 1937.

== Honours ==
Cracovia

- Ekstraklasa: 1937
