= 1939 Ekstraklasa =

19th season of top-tier football league in Poland

Liga
- Season: 1939
- Champions: not awarded
- Relegated: Union Touring Łódź
- Highest scoring: Ernst Wilimowski (26 goals)

The 1939 season of Ekstraklasa was the 19th edition of the Ekstraklasa, the national football championship of Poland, at the time the Second Polish Republic. The tournament was abandoned because of the invasion of Poland by Nazi Germany on 1 September 1939, which led to the start of the Second World War. The league would not resume until 1946, with significant border changes.

== League table ==
Pos	Team	Pld	W	D	L	GF	GA	GD	Pts
1	Ruch Chorzów	14	8	2	4	50	22	+28	18
2	Wisła Kraków	12	7	2	3	31	20	+11	16
3	Pogoń Lwów	13	7	2	4	27	22	+5	16
4	AKS Chorzów	12	6	3	3	30	14	+16	15
5	Warta Poznań	12	7	1	4	34	20	+14	15
6	Cracovia	13	7	0	6	23	32	−9	14
7	Polonia Warsaw	12	5	2	5	28	28	0	12
8	Garbarnia Kraków	13	4	2	7	17	32	−15	10
9	Warszawianka	11	2	1	8	16	29	−13	5
10	Union Touring Łódź (R)	12	1	1	10	15	51	−36	3

Source: 90minut.pl (in Polish)
(R) Relegated

== Results ==
Home \ Away	AKS	CRA	GAR	POG	PWA	RUC	UTŁ	WAW	WAR	WIS
AKS Chorzów		1–2	3–0	2–0		2–3		0–0		3–3
Cracovia				3–4	2–1	2–5	1–0	2–1	1–3	
Garbarnia Kraków	2–3	1–2			2–2	2–1	2–1		3–2	1–1
Pogoń Lwów	1–1	3–0	5–1		3–2	3–2	2–2			
Polonia Warsaw	0–3			2–1		2–2	6–1		3–1	5–4
Ruch Chorzów		5–1	5–0	4–1	2–3		12–1		1–1	
Union Touring Łódź	1–7	2–3	2–1	1–2				3–5		1–3
Warszawianka	0–4	1–3	0–2		5–1	0–5				0–1
Warta Poznań	2–1		5–0	0–1		5–2	7–0	4–2		4–1
Wisła Kraków		5–1		2–1	2–1	0–1		4–2	5–0	

Source: 90minut.pl (in Polish)
Legend: Blue = home team win; Yellow = draw; Red = away team win.
