= 1. FC Kattowitz =

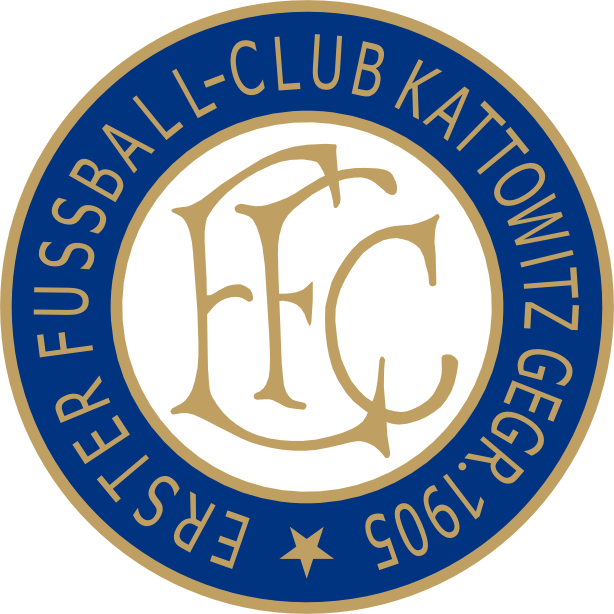
- Full name: Erster Fussball-Club Kattowitz 1905 e.V.
- Founded: 1905
- Dissolved: 1945
- Ground: Turngemeindeplatze
- Capacity: 35,000
| Home colours | Away colours |

1. FC Kattowitz (Polish: 1. FC Katowice) was an ethnically German football club playing in what was Kattowitz, Silesia Province in Germany (now Katowice, Silesian Voivodeship, Poland) and was active during the inter-war period and World War II when the two countries struggled over control of the region. Established in 1905, the original club disappeared in 1945; a modern-day Polish club using the name 1. FC Katowice was formed in 2007.

== History ==
=== Origins as FC Preußen ===
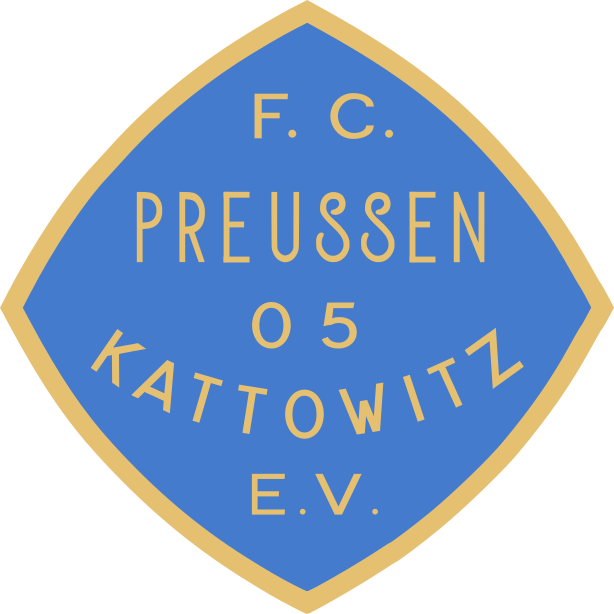
Logo of FC Preußen Kattowitz, ca. 1905–22

The original club was formed by brothers Emil and Rudolf Fonfara as FC Preußen Kattowitz out of predecessor side Sportverein Frisch Auf Kattowitz. SV was the first football club in the region and was established at the initiative of local priests. One of the local organizers was Karol Walica, whose father brought the first leather football to the city from Berlin.

Preußen was one of three clubs that followed out of SV, alongside Germania Kattowitz and Diana Kattowitz, that formed the short-lived Kattowitzer Ballspiel-Verband (KBV, en:Kattowitz Ballgame Association). The team claimed that league's only championship in 1905.

Top-flight football in the region was dominated by the Verband Breslauer Ballspiel-Vereine (VBB, en:Association of Breslau Ballgame Clubs, 1903–06) and the Verband Niederlausitzer Ballspielvereine (VNB, en:Association of Niederlausitz Ballgame Clubs, 1904–06). These two associations merged in 1906 to form the regional Südostdeutschland Fußballverband (SOFV, en:Southeast German Football Association) and FC Preußen became part of the league in the 1906–07 season. The team advanced to the league final in 1908 and 1909 where they were defeated in turn by VfR Breslau (5:2) and SC Alemannia Cottbus (3:2). They made another appearance in the final in 1913 and beat Askania Forst 2:1, however, Forst protested the result and beat Kattowitz 4:0 in the re-play. The outbreak of World War I in 1914 led to the suspension of championship play in the SOFV until the 1919–20 season.

=== Activity in Poland during the Interwar Period ===
Logo of 1. FC Kattowitz, ca. 1922

After the war and the re-establishment of a Polish republic, Upper Silesia was the subject of a territorial dispute between Germany and Poland. Following the Silesian Uprisings in 1921 and a subsequent League of Nations plebiscite, part of the region – including Kattowitz – was granted to Poland and the name of the city was changed to Katowice. The football club was caught up in the politically charged events of the period.

In 1920–21 Preußen was still part of German football competition in the SOFV. The season ended with Vereinigte Breslauer Sportfreunde, Viktoria Forst, and Kattowitz in a three-way tie for first place separated only by goal difference, which was not at the time considered decisive. A playoff was organized to determine which of the three clubs would take part in the German national playoffs. Kattowitz was unable to participate because of passport problems and Forst ultimately went on to represent the SOFV. A separate playoff was later held to determine which of the three clubs would be Südostdeutschland champions. Breslau won both of their matches – including a 5:1 victory over Preußen – to claim the title.

With the transfer of the city of Kattowitz to Poland, the city's name took its Polish name of Katowice, the name of the club being Polonized in 1922 to 1. Klub Sportowy Katowice accordingly. That same year, the membership of the club successfully challenged the change in court and won the right to play as 1. FC Kattowitz. By 1924, the team was part of regional Polish competition and playing as 1. FC Katowice. It soon emerged as one of the strongest teams in the country and finished second to Wisła Kraków in the first season of Poland's newly established national competition in 1927. Katowice lost a crucial match 0:2 at home to Wisła

During this period Katowice was well known for its excellent players: goalkeeper Emil Goerlitz, who was the first footballer from Upper Silesia to play for the Polish national team; defender Erich Heidenreich, regarded as one of the best backs in Europe, who refused to play for Poland citing his German heritage; and forward Karol Kossok, another Polish national who went on to become the top scorer for the clubs Cracovia Kraków and Pogoń Lwów. The team's most famous player was Ernest Willimowski, who started his career with Katowice, but was sold to Ruch Chorzów in 1933, and appeared with both the Polish and German national squads.

Katowice faltered in 1929 and was relegated from first division Polish football, descending to play in the regional Silesian league where they became champions in 1932. They went on to the promotion round playoffs against the winners of the Kraków league (Podgorze Kraków) and Kielce league (Warta Zawiercie). The Katowice side twice beat Warta (5:2, 6:2), but also twice lost to Podgorze (1:2, 1:3). As a result, Podgorze qualified for the central playoffs, and later went on the national league.

=== Play under the Third Reich in the 1940s ===
In June 1939, the club's activities were suspended by Polish authorities when they were accused of promoting and supporting the interests of Nazi Germany. After the German invasion of Poland which began World War II in the fall of 1939, the team resumed play with German authorities looking to hold up 1. FC Kattowitz as a model side in Upper Silesia for propaganda purposes.

In 1933, German football was reorganized under the Third Reich into sixteen top-flight Gauligen. With the onset of the war, existing divisions were expanded or additional divisions were formed to incorporate conquered territories. Citing the club's "excellent fighting spirit during the Polish-time", Nazi sporting authorities advanced 1. FC to the Gauliga Schlesien in 1940 without their having to qualify competitively, unlike other teams in the region. Kattowitz earned a third-place result in the 1940–41 campaign.

The division was split the following year into the Gauliga Niederschlesien and the Gauliga Oberschlesien, where 1. FC played until the end of the war. The club attracted players such as Ewald Dytko, Paweł Cyganek, Erwin Nyc and Wilimowski to its ranks, but was never able to overtake rival Germania Königshütte, instead struggling as a lower table side that was unable to develop into a propaganda show piece as authorities had hoped.

The club's last known match was a 1:2 loss to Preußen Hindenburg on 14 January 1945. A game scheduled for a week later versus TuS Schwientochlowitz was never played and by 27 January Soviet Red Army troops occupied the city. 1. FC Kattowitz sat atop the division at the end of the never completed season and the club soon ceased to exist. Today a side playing as 1. FC Katowice competes in the Polish A-Class (7th level; men) and Polish Extra League (women).

== Honours ==
- Polish vice-champions: 1927
- Upper Silesia (Germany) champions (5): 1907, 1908, 1909, 1913, 1922
- Autonomous Silesian Voivodeship (Poland) champions: 1932
