= Antoni Gałecki =

Polish footballer

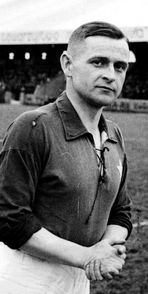

Personal information
- Full name: Antoni Gałecki
- Date of birth: 4 June 1906
- Place of birth: Łódź, Congress Poland
- Date of death: 14 December 1958 (aged 52)
- Place of death: Łódź, Poland
- Height: 1.70 m (5 ft 7 in)
- Position: Defender

Youth career
- HKS Łódź

Senior career*
Years	Team	Apps	(Gls)
1922–1939	ŁKS Łódź	211	(1)
1941	HAŠK		
1947	ŁKS Łódź		

International career
1928–1938	Poland	18	(0)

Managerial career
- 1934: ŁKS Łódź (player-manager)
- TUR Łódź
- Boruta Zgierz
- Kolejarz Łódź
- Resursa Łódź
- Budowlani Łódź
- Orzeł Łódź
- Budowlani Kutno
- Włókniarz Pabianice
- Włókniarz Łódź
- Lechia Tomaszów Mazowiecki
- Włókniarz Aleksandrów Łódzki
- * Club domestic league appearances and goals

Antoni Gałecki (4 June 1906 – 14 December 1958) was a Polish footballer who played as a defender, spending most of his career with ŁKS Łódź. He also played on the Poland national team during the 1936 Berlin Olympics and Poland's 1938 FIFA World Cup lone match against Brazil.

Born in Łódź, Gałecki joined ŁKS in 1922, becoming its key defender four years later. Gałecki represented this team until 1939, participating in more than 400 games. In many of them, he was the team captain.

He earned 22 caps for the Poland national team. He made his debut against Czechoslovakia on 27 October 1928 in Prague.

During the 1936 Berlin Olympics, Gałecki was a key defender for the Polish team, participating in all games, a 3–0 victory over Hungary, a 5–4 win over Great Britain, a 1–3 defeat to Austria and a 2–3 loss to Norway, as Poland finished in 4th place.

From 1937 to 1938, Gałecki played in qualifying matches for the 1938 World Cup. In Warsaw, Poland beat Yugoslavia 4–0. In the second leg, in Belgrade, the Poles lost 0–1, but Poland qualified on goal advantage. Gałecki represented Poland in a legendary World Cup game against Brazil on 5 June 1938 in Strasbourg, France. The Poles lost 5–6, but the match is to this day regarded as one of the best performances of the Poland national team.

Called to active military duty in August 1939, Gałecki fought in the September 1939 Campaign. He was held prisoner in a POW camp in Eger, Hungary, but managed to escape through Yugoslavia and Greece and reached Palestine, where he became a soldier of the Polish 2nd Corps. Gałecki fought at Tobruk and Monte Cassino. After the war, Gałecki returned to his hometown in 1947.

He died in Łódź.

== See also ==
- Polish Roster in World Cup Soccer France 1938
