= 1934 Ekstraklasa =

14th season of top-tier football league in Poland

Liga
- Season: 1934
- Champions: Ruch Chorzów (2nd title)
- Relegated: Podgórze Kraków; Strzelec Siedlce
- Top goalscorer: Ernst Wilimowski (33 goals)

Statistics of Ekstraklasa for the 1934 season.

== Overview ==
It was contested by 12 teams, and Ruch Chorzów won the championship.

== League table ==
Pos	Team	Pld	W	D	L	GF	GA	GD	Pts
1	Ruch Chorzów (C)	22	16	4	2	90	29	+61	36
2	KS Cracovia	22	14	1	7	48	32	+16	29
3	Wisła Kraków	22	13	2	7	54	36	+18	28
4	Garbarnia Kraków	21	11	3	7	49	36	+13	25
5	Legia Warsaw	22	10	4	8	37	30	+7	24
6	Pogoń Lwów	22	12	0	10	41	38	+3	24
7	Warta Poznań	22	9	4	9	50	44	+6	22
8	ŁKS Łódź	21	10	1	10	31	45	−14	21
9	Polonia Warsaw	22	6	6	10	30	47	−17	18
10	Warszawianka Warszawa	22	8	1	13	26	33	−7	17
11	Podgórze Kraków (R)	22	6	3	13	37	53	−16	15
12	Strzelec Siedlce (R)	22	1	1	20	15	73	−58	3

Source: 90minut.pl (in Polish)
(C) Champions; (R) Relegated

== Results ==
Home \ Away	CRA	GAR	LEG	ŁKS	POD	POG	PWA	RUC	STR	WAW	WAR	WIS
Cracovia		2–1	2–0	4–3	3–1	3–1	5–0	0–3	7–0	4–0	1–2	2–1
Garbarnia Kraków	4–0		3–0	– (Note: The match between Garbarnia Kraków and ŁKS Łódź, which was postponed to November 25, 1934, was not played. Both clubs were punished with a 0:3 defeat. The table shows a higher difference by two defeats and six goals.)	1–0	1–4	2–0	2–2	3–0 (Note: Strzelec Siedlce withdrew in August 1934. The remaining ten games were rated 0:3 for the opponents.)	4–0	2–2	3–0
Legia Warsaw	0–0	1–1		6–1	2–2	1–0	1–2	2–2	5–4	1–0	2–1	3–2
ŁKS Łódź	3–0	2–1	1–0		2–0	2–1	1–0	1–3	2–1	0–1	0–2	2–4
Podgórze Kraków	2–3	1–3	2–0	1–1		2–0	5–0	1–3	3–0	2–3	2–3	1–5
Pogoń Lwów	1–4	5–2	1–0	1–2	3–1		2–1	1–5	3–0	1–2	3–1	3–0 (Note: The match between Pogoń Lwów and Wisła Kraków was stopped after 85 minutes and was scored 3–0.)
Polonia Warsaw	2–1	0–5	0–1	4–2	2–2	1–3		3–3	0–0	1–0	2–5	4–5
Ruch Chorzów	3–1	7–4	1–0	6–0	13–0	5–0	1–2		3–0	5–1	7–3	4–1
Strzelec Siedlce	0–3	1–3	0–3	0–3	0–3	1–3	0–3	3–5		0–3	5–2	0–3
Warszawianka	0–2	3–1	0–4	3–0	0–3	1–2	1–1	1–7	2–0		2–0	1–4
Warta Poznań	0–1	2–0	2–3	2–1	5–3	1–3	2–2	1–1	3–0	8–0		1–2
Wisła Kraków	5–0	1–3	3–2	0–2	1–0	2–0	0–0	2–1	8–0	3–2	2–2	

Source: 90minut.pl (in Polish)
Legend: Blue = home team win; Yellow = draw; Red = away team win.
