= Katowice Forest Park =

Park in Katowice, Poland

- Katowicki Park Leśny
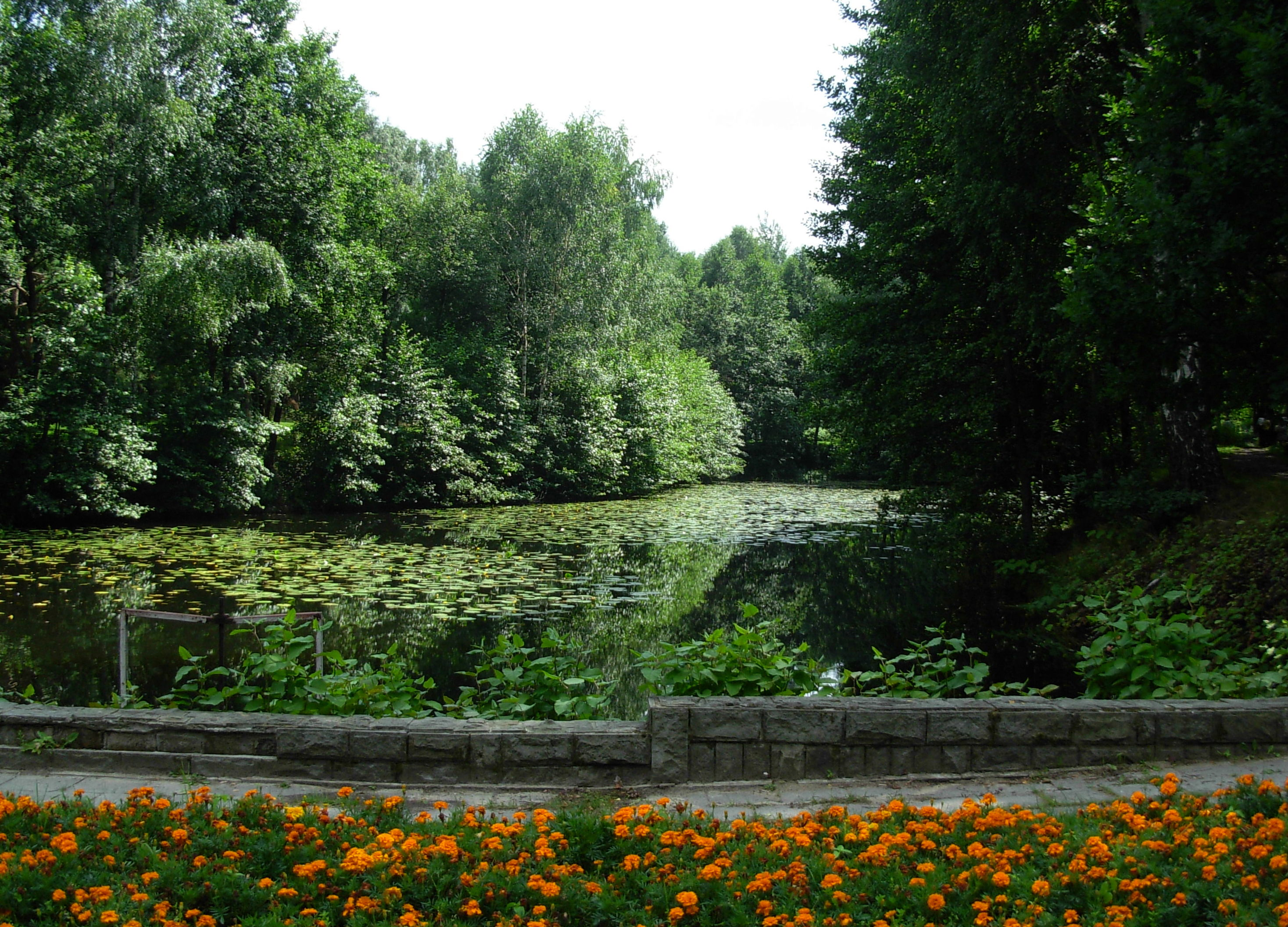
- Interactive map of Katowice Forest Park
- Type: Forest park / Nature reserve
- Location: Katowice, Poland
- Nearest city: Katowice
- Coordinates: 50°13′48″N 19°01′12″E
- Area: 640 hectares
- Status: Open
- Hiking trails: Yes
- Habitats: Mixed forest, wetlands
- Water: Muchowiec pond system

Katowice Forest Park (Polish: Katowicki Park Leśny) is a large park and wooded area in the southern part of the city of Katowice, Poland. It is the largest green area in Katowice, and has been named one of the Upper Silesia area's "most important natural resources".

== See also ==
- Tourism in Poland
