= Sándor Ádám (footballer) =

Hungarian footballer

Personal information
- Date of birth: 21 July 1918
- Place of birth: Austria-Hungary
- Date of death: 2 November 1974 (aged 56)
- Position: Forward

Senior career*
Years	Team	Apps	(Gls)
1936–1943	Újpest FC	116 (37)	

International career
1939	hungary	2 (1)	
- * Club domestic league appearances and goals

Sándor Ádám (21 July 1918 – 2 November 1974) was an association football player, forward on the right side.

== Career ==
=== At Újpest ===
He played for Újpest between 1936. and 1943.they won the championship in the season of 1938-1939. He played on 116 matches in the championship and scored 37 goals.

=== At the national team ===
He played for the nation at two times and scored one goal.

== Successes ==
- Hungarian Championship
  - Champion: 1938–39
  - 2.: 1937–38, 1940–41, 1941–42
  - 3.: 1936–37, 1939–40

== Sources ==
- Antal Zoltán – Hoffer József: Alberttől Zsákig, Budapest, Sportkiadó, 1968
- Rejtő László – Lukács László – Szepesi György: Felejthetetlen 90 percek, Budapest, Sportkiadó, 1977, ISBN 963-253-501-4
