= Walter Brom =

Polish footballer (1921–1968)

Personal information
- Full name: Walter Henryk Brom
- Date of birth: 14 January 1921
- Place of birth: Chorzów, Poland
- Date of death: 18 June 1968 (aged 47)
- Place of death: Chorzów, Poland
- Height: 1.78 m (5 ft 10 in)
- Position: Goalkeeper

Senior career*
Years	Team	Apps	(Gls)
1935–1939	Ruch Chorzów		
1939	TuS Schwientochlowitz		
1940–1944	Bismarckhütter SV		
1946–1950	Ruch Chorzów		
1950	RKS Batory		
1951	Stal Poręba		

International career
1947	Poland	2	(0)
- * Club domestic league appearances and goals

Walter Henryk Brom (14 January 1921 – 18 June 1968) was a Polish footballer who played as a goalkeeper.

Brom, who played for Ruch Chorzów, was a reserve player of Polish team at the 1938 FIFA World Cup. He was (and to this day is) the youngest goalie who has ever been listed in any World Cup finals. In early June 1938, when the tournament took place, he was only 17 years and four months old. He spent Poland's only game at the tournament, a 5–6 loss to Brazil, on the bench. He was one of the few players who continued his career after World War II. He made his official debut for the senior team on 11 June 1947 in a 1–3 loss to Norway.

During World War II, Brom was forced to join the Wehrmacht, but he didn't fight and was liberated due "problem in ears".

== See also ==
- Poland at the 1938 FIFA World Cup
