= Bruno Knežević =

Croatian footballer (1915–1982)

Personal information
- Date of birth: 12 March 1915
- Place of birth: Čaporice, Croatia-Slavonia, Austria-Hungary
- Date of death: 26 March 1982 (aged 67)
- Place of death: Zagreb, SR Croatia, SFR Yugoslavia

Senior career*
Years	Team	Apps	(Gls)
1927–1934	Bokelj Kotor		
1934–1941	BSK Belgrade		
1941–1945	HAŠK Zagreb		
1945–1946	Dinamo Zagreb	0	(0)

International career
1938	Yugoslavia	1	(0)

Managerial career
- 1949: Dinamo Zagreb
- 1949–1951: NK Zagreb
- 1952–195x: NK Zagreb
- 1956: Croatia
- * Club domestic league appearances and goals

Bruno Knežević (12 March 1915 – 26 March 1982) was a Croatian and Yugoslav footballer and sports official. He was president of the Croatian Football Federation (HNS), a sub-association of the Football Federation of Yugoslavia (FSJ), from 1968 to 1971.

== International career ==
Knežević made his debut for Yugoslavia in an April 1938 World Cup qualification match against Poland, his sole international appearance.
