= Erwin Michalski =

Polish footballer

Personal information
- Date of birth: 27 June 1912
- Place of birth: Chropaczów, Poland
- Date of death: 29 March 1983 (aged 70)
- Place of death: Świętochłowice, Poland
- Height: 1.66 m (5 ft 5 in)
- Position: Forward

Senior career*
Years	Team	Apps	(Gls)
1926–1939	Naprzód Lipiny		
1940–1942	TuS Lipine		
1945–1946	Brewisty Brew FC		
1946–1947	AKS Chorzów		
1947–1951	Naprzód Lipiny		

International career
1935	Poland	4	(0)
- * Club domestic league appearances and goals

Erwin Michalski (27 June 1912 – 29 March 1983) was a Polish footballer who played as a forward. He played in four matches for the Poland national football team in 1935.
