= Diana Kattowitz =

German football club

SC Diana Kattowitz
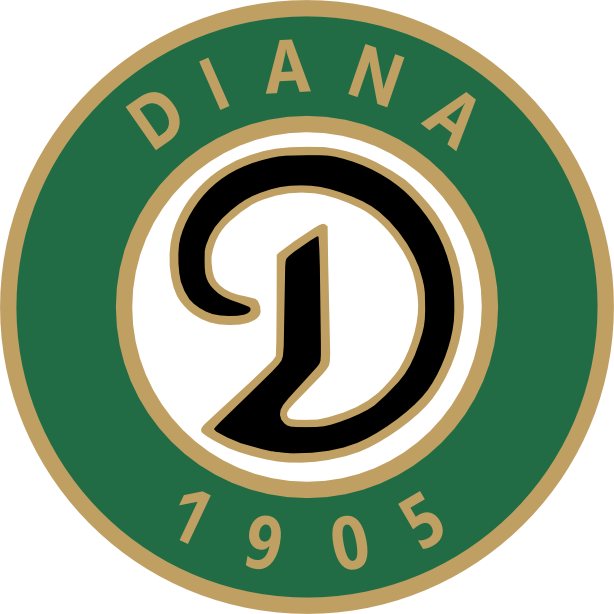
- Full name: Sport-Club Diana Kattowitz 1905 e.V.
- Founded: 13 February 1905
- Dissolved: 1939
- Ground: Diana-Sportplatz
Home colours	Away colours

SC Diana Kattowitz was an ethnically German association football club playing in what was Kattowitz, Upper Silesia in Germany (now Katowice, Poland) during the inter-war period. Established 13 February 1905, it was one of a small number of clubs that made up the Kattowitzer Ballspiel-Verband alongside Preussen Kattowitz and Germania Kattowitz. With FC 1903 Ratibor, these clubs formed the Upper Silesian division (Bezirk Oberschlesien) of the Southeast German Football Federation in 1906.

== History ==
Diana was named by founding president Ernst Tschoche in honour of the Roman goddess of hunting and had a membership of about 50, mostly students and employees of the Kattowitzer Bahndirektion (en:Kattowitz Railways Directorate). The team took part in qualification play for the German national championship in 1912 following their capture of the Upper Silesian title, but were eliminated early on by Germania Breslau. Their title was enabled through a merger with Borussia Myslowitz in 1911, as both clubs were struggling at the time. A side made up of seven Diana and four Borussia footballers playing as Diana was fielded.

Football competition ground to a halt in the region due to World War I. After the conflict, a Polish republic was re-established, and Upper Silesia was the subject of a territorial dispute between Germany and Poland. In 1921, a League of Nations plebiscite granted part of the region – including Kattowitz – to Poland. Borussia and Diana had re-emerged as separate sides in 1919 with Diana Kattowitz becoming part of lower tier Polish football competition as Klub Sportowy Diana Katowice in 1922. Following the invasion of Poland by the Nazis in 1939, the club was displaced by the formation of VfB Kattowitz, which was active until 1944 when it disappeared as the area was restored to Polish control.

== Crest ==
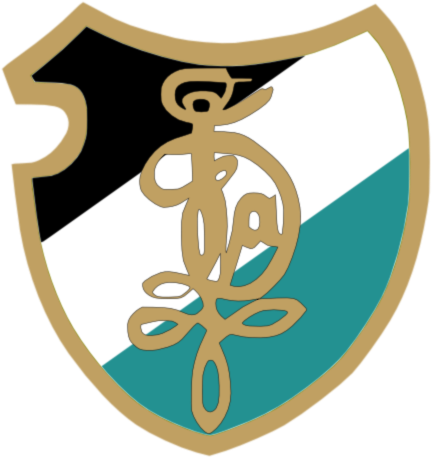
1905–1923

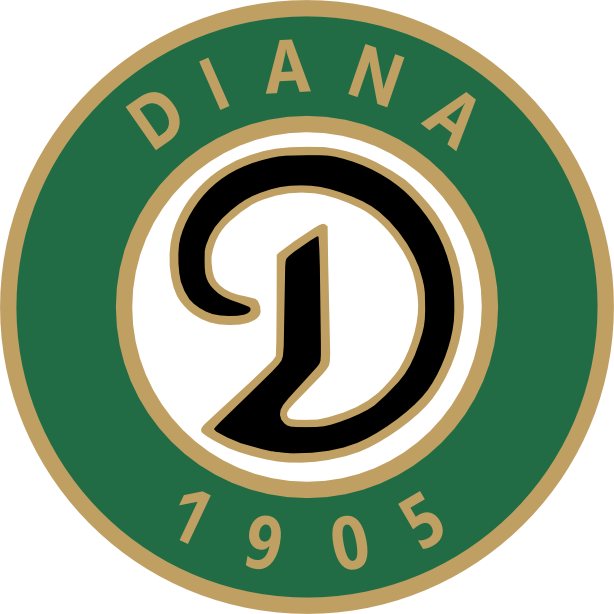
1923–1939

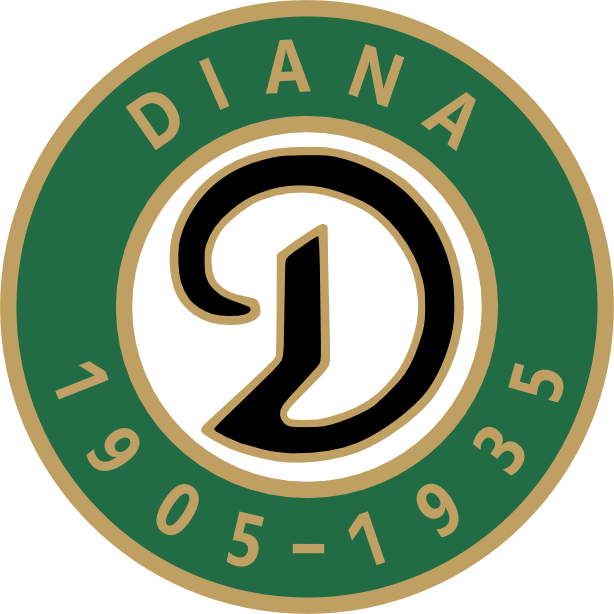
30th Jubilee Logo

== Honours ==
- Upper Silesia (Germany) champions: 1912
