= Gerard Wodarz =

Polish footballer (1913–1982)

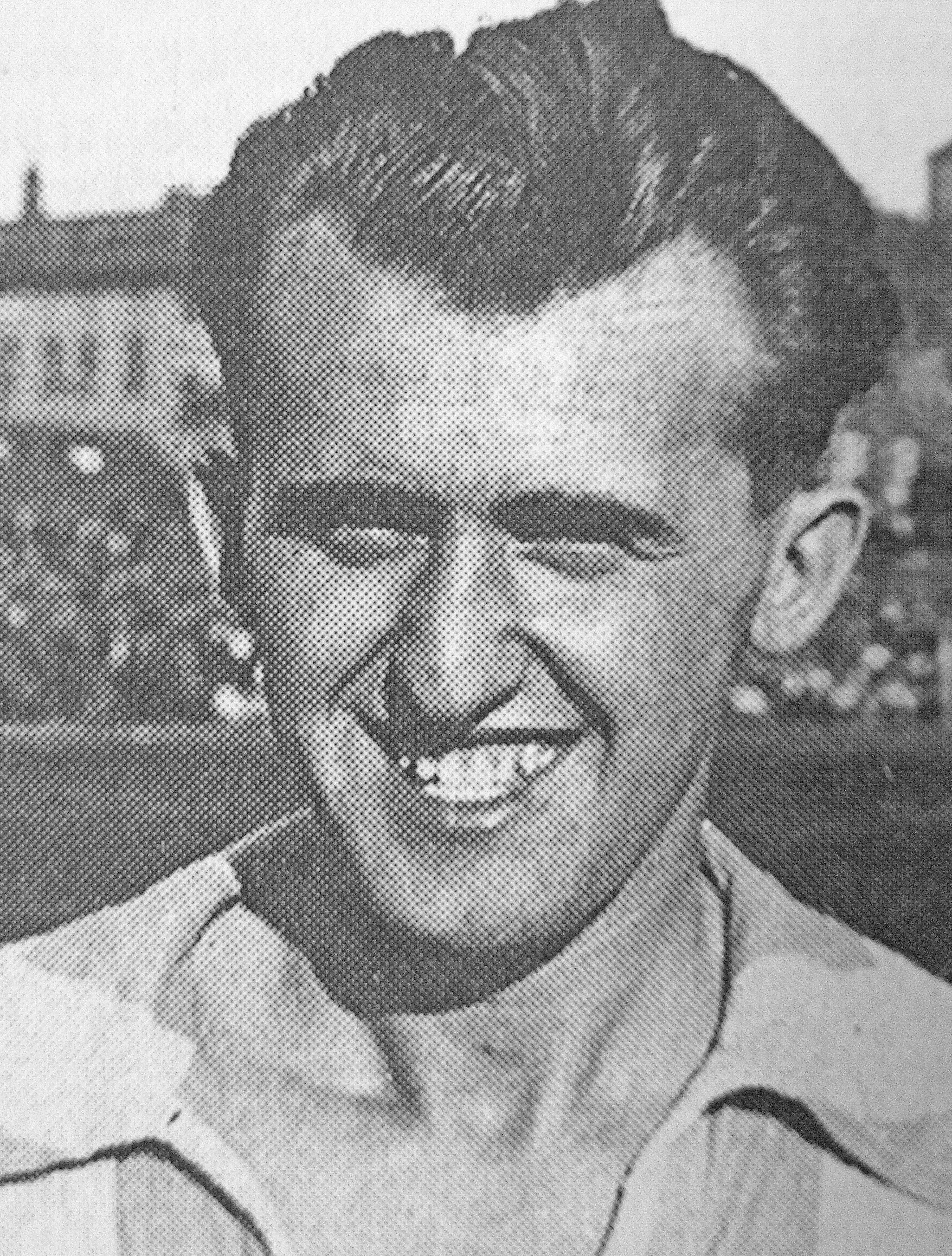

Personal information
- Date of birth: 10 August 1913
- Place of birth: Bismarckhütte, German Empire
- Date of death: 8 November 1982 (aged 69)
- Place of death: Chorzów, Poland
- Position: Striker

Senior career*
Years	Team	Apps	(Gls)
1928–1939	Ruch Wielkie Hajduki		
1939–1941	Bismarckhütter SV 99		
1945	RAF Newton Notts		
1945-1946	Fraserburgh	6	(1)
1946–1947	Ruch Chorzów		

International career
1932–1939	Poland	28	(9)

Managerial career
- 1948: Rymer Niedobczyce
- 1949: Ruch Chorzów
- 1950: Piast Gliwice
- 1950–1954: Górnik Zabrze
- 1957: Górnik Świętochłowice
- 1958: ŁTS Łabędy
- 1960: Piast Gliwice
- 1961: Ruch Chorzów
- 1967: Górnik 09 Mysłowice
- * Club domestic league appearances and goals

Gerard Wodarz (10 August 1913 – 8 November 1982) was a Polish footballer who played as a striker. One of the best players of interwar Poland, he was a multiple champion of the country (representing Ruch Wielkie Hajduki, which in January 1939 became Ruch Chorzów) and also played 28 games on the Poland national team, scoring 9 goals.

== Biography ==
He was born in 1913 in Bismarckhütte (a settlement in Upper Silesia, which in January 1939 became part of the city of Chorzów), and died in 1982 in his hometown.

Wodarz was a left-wing forward player. His career started in Ruch Wielkie Hajduki, in which he played in the years 1926–1939 and after the war, in 1946–47. Together with Ernest Wilimowski and Teodor Peterek, he was part of one of the best forward formations in the history of Ruch. In 183 games he scored 51 goals, and won five Polish championships (1933–1936 and 1938).

He made 28 appearances for the Poland national team. His debut occurred on 2 October 1932 in Bucharest, against Romania. Wodarz participated in the 1936 Summer Olympics in Berlin, where he scored five goals. Also, he represented Poland during one of the most famous games in Polish football history, against Brazil in Strasbourg, France, during the 1938 FIFA World Cup.

After the German Invasion of Poland in September 1939, Wodarz signed a German Nationality List (Volksliste) and played for a newly created team, Bismarckhütter SV 99 (which was based on the prewar Ruch Chorzów). In 1941, he was called up to the Wehrmacht and in 1944 he was captured by the U.S. Army. The Americans passed him to the Polish Armed Forces in the West, where he returned to football, playing for some British teams including Fraserburgh FC in the Scottish Highland League where his time was cut short by breaking his ankle in a match v. Buchan rivals Peterhead.

In 1946, he returned to Poland and for next two years represented Ruch Chorzów. His career ended in 1947. Later, he managed several Upper Silesian teams, but without major achievements.

== Honours ==
Ruch Chorzów

- Ekstraklasa: 1933, 1934, 1935, 1936, 1938
