= Henryk Mikunda =

Polish footballer

Personal information
- Date of birth: 1 June 1917
- Place of birth: Mysłowice, Poland
- Date of death: 21 August 1988 (aged 71)
- Place of death: Mysłowice, Poland
- Height: 1.72 m (5 ft 8 in)
- Position: Midfielder

Senior career*
Years	Team	Apps	(Gls)
1930–1931	KS 06 Mysłowice		
1932	RKS Mysłowice		
1933–1937	KS 06 Mysłowice		
1938–1939	Ruch Hajduki Wielkie	27	(0)
1939–1943	Reichsbahn SV Myslowitz		
1947–1955	KS 06 Mysłowice		

International career
1939	Poland	1	(0)
- * Club domestic league appearances and goals

Henryk Mikunda (1 June 1917 – 21 August 1988) was a Polish footballer who played as a midfielder. He played in one match for the Poland national football team in 1939.
