= Fablok Chrzanów =

Polish sports club

- Full name: Miejski Klub Sportowy; Fablok w Chrzanowie
- Founded: 26 September 1926; 99 years ago
- Ground: Szpitalna 78a Stadium
- Capacity: 200
- Chairman: Paweł Wielgosz
- Manager: Maciej Knapik
- League: Klasa A Chrzanów
- 2024–25: Regional league Wadowice, 16th of 16 (relegated)
- Website: https://fablok.net
Home colours

Fablok Chrzanów is a Polish sports club, founded in 1926 in Chrzanów. Its name reflects the name of club's past sponsor - Fablok.

Fablok's most famous association football player is Paweł Cyganek, who played one game for the Poland national team in a 4–2 win over Hungary on 27 August 1939. The club, however, also had other sections - ice-hockey, chess, volleyball, basketball, tennis, and handball (which became the strongest one, reaching Nationwide Polish Handball League). A few years ago, the handball section split from Fablok and now exists under the name of MTS Chrzanów.

Currently, after financial problems, Fablok supports only one section - association football. In 1939, they played promotion play-offs to the national league with Śląsk Świętochłowice and Unia Sosnowiec. After World War II, the club played in the third division twice, in 1971 and 1997. As of the 2025–26 season, they play in Chrzanów group of Klasa A.
