= Germania Kattowitz =

Polish football club

SC Germania Kattowitz
- Full name: Sport-Club Germania Kattowitz
- Founded: 1905
- 2008–09: defunct
Home colours	Away colours

Germania Kattowitz was an ethnically German association football club playing in what was Kattowitz, Upper Silesia in Germany (now Katowice, Poland) before the First World War and shortly afterwards. It was one of a small number of clubs that made up the Kattowitzer Ballspiel-Verband alongside Preussen Kattowitz and Diana Kattowitz. With FC 1903 Ratibor, these clubs formed the Upper Silesian division (Bezirk Oberschlesien) of the Southeast German Football Federation in 1906.

In 1908, Germania was the largest of the three Kattowitz clubs with 90 members. The team finished as vice-champions that year, while the reserve sides captured the 2nd and 3rd class titles. Germania twice won the Oberschlesien title and subsequently took part in the opening rounds of the German national championship playoffs where they were quickly eliminated.

The last known record of the club is a third-place result in the Südkreis Kattowitz in the 1921–22 season. It is believed Germania disappeared soon after Upper Silesia became part of Poland in 1922.

== Honours ==
- Upper Silesia (Germany) champions: 1910, 1911
- Upper Silesia (Germany) vice-champions: 1908
