= Wilhelm Góra =

Polish footballer (1916–1975)

Personal information
- Full name: Wilhelm Antoni Góra
- Date of birth: 18 January 1916
- Place of birth: Bytom, German Empire
- Date of death: 21 May 1975 (aged 59)
- Place of death: Homberg, Germany
- Height: 1.76 m (5 ft 9 in)
- Position: Midfielder

Senior career*
Years	Team	Apps	(Gls)
- Strzelec Szarlej
1933	Polonia Piekary Śląskie		
1934–1935	Pogoń Katowice		
1935–1939	Cracovia		
1940–1942	DTSG Krakau		

International career
1935–1939	Poland	16	(0)
- * Club domestic league appearances and goals

Wilhelm Antoni Góra (18 January 1916 – 21 May 1975) was a Polish footballer who played as a midfielder.

His career started in Szarlej - a small hamlet located near Bytom. After some years, he moved to Pogoń Katowice (which no longer exists) before joining Cracovia, one of the best teams of interwar Poland.

His debut in the Polish top flight took place in 1934, and until 1939 Góra participated in 134 Cracovia games, winning the 1937 league title with the rest of the team. In 1935, he made his debut for the Poland national team, and in 1936, he was a participant of the Olympic Games, where Poland finished in fourth place. He played in a 5–6 1938 FIFA World Cup loss to Brazil on 5 June 1938 in Strasbourg, France.

Until 1939, Góra was a key midfield player of the Poland national team and by then he had played in 16 games. After the beginning of World War II, he signed the Volksliste (German nationality list), which allowed him to continue the career. Góra remained in Kraków, playing in a German-only team DTSG Krakau (one of the sponsors of this club was Oskar Schindler). Called up to the Wehrmacht, he was taken with his unit to Italy, where he was captured by Allied soldiers. There, Góra joined the 2nd Corps of the Polish army under General Władysław Anders.

After 1945, Góra wanted to return to Upper Silesia. However, this proved to be impossible and thus he remained in West Germany, where he died.

== Honours ==
Cracovia

- Ekstraklasa: 1937
