= Adolf Krzyk =

Polish footballer

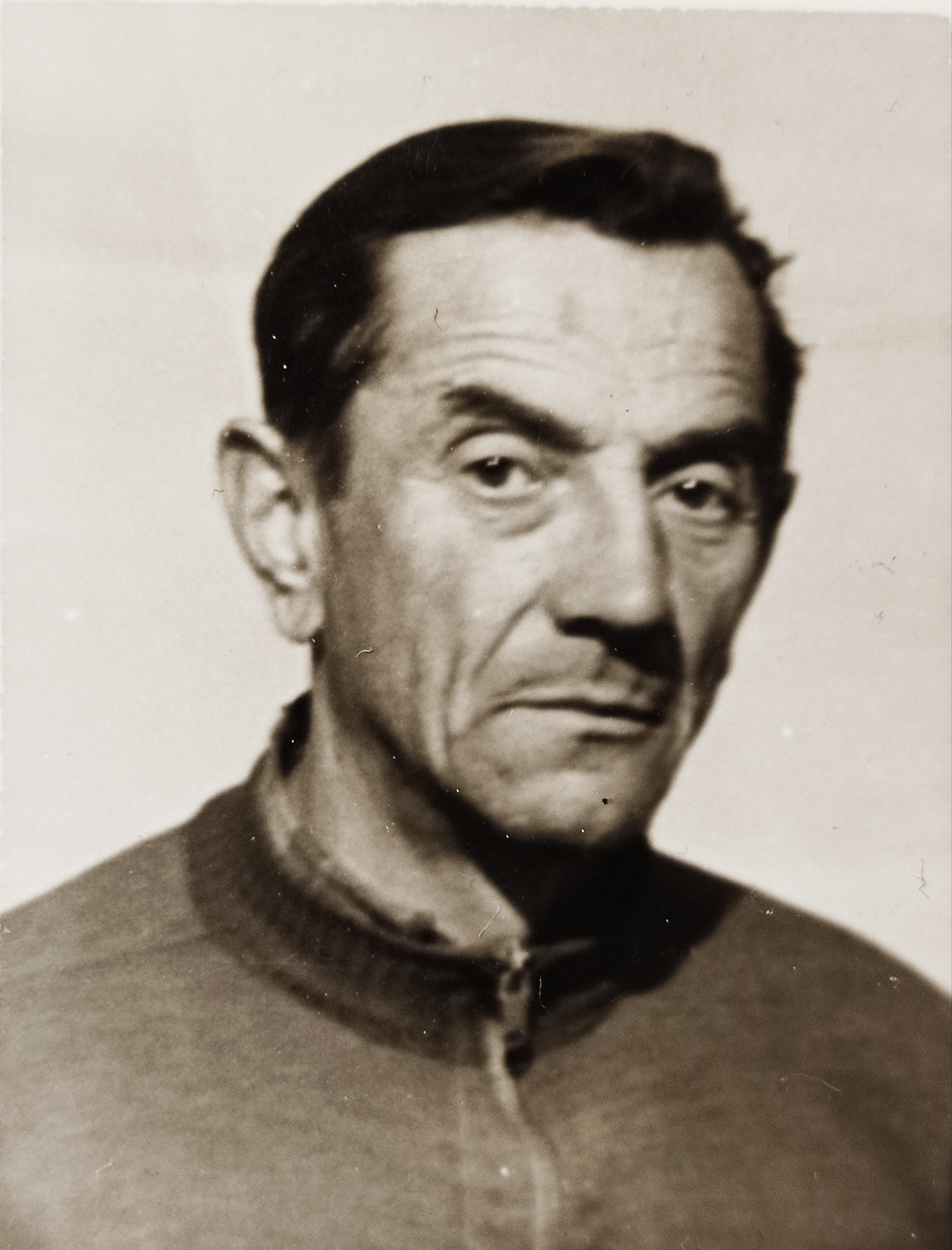

Personal information
- Date of birth: 25 December 1907
- Place of birth: Moravská Ostrava, Austria-Hungary
- Date of death: 12 September 1987 (aged 79)
- Place of death: Niemodlin, Poland
- Position: Goalkeeper

Senior career*
Years	Team	Apps	(Gls)
–1923	Meteor Ostrava		
1923–1928	Unie Ostrava		
1928–1930	Čechie Karlín		
1930–1931	Nachod		
1931–1933	CSI Trenčín		
1934	Przemsza Poręba		
1934	Warta Zawiercie		
1934–1939	Brygada Częstochowa		
1945	Pogoń Katowice		
1945–1946	CKS Częstochowa		
1946–1948	Burza Wrocław		
1949–1950	Pafawag Wrocław		
1951–1953	Chojnowianka Chojnów		
1953	Orzeł Niemodlin		

International career
1937–1939	Poland	6	(0)
- * Club domestic league appearances and goals

Adolf Krzyk (25 December 1907 – 12 September 1987) was a Polish footballer who played as a goalkeeper.

== Career ==
Born in Moravská Ostrava, Krzyk played football until he retired with Orzeł Niemodlin in 1953.

Krzyk represented both Brygada Częstochowa and the Poland national team, where his main rival for the starting position was Edward Madejski. Altogether, he earned six caps for Poland, allowing 11 goals. His debut took place in a 3–1 win over Denmark on 12 September 1937 in Warsaw. Krzyk's last international appearance came on 27 August 1939 in a 4–2 victory over Hungary, Poland's last game before the outbreak of World War II.

== See also ==
- 1939 Poland v Hungary football match
