= Brygada Częstochowa =

Polish football club

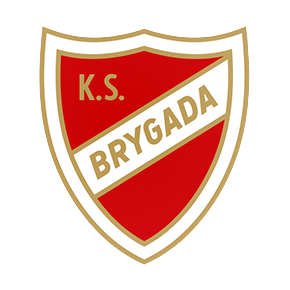
- Founded: 1932
- Dissolved: 1939
- Ground: The Marshall Józef Piłsudski's Municipal Stadium, Humbertowska Street, Częstochowa
- League: A Class Championship 1932–1939
Home colours

Brygada Częstochowa was a football team from Częstochowa, Poland. The team was supported by Częstochowa's garrison of the Polish Army and in the 1930s, it played in regional soccer A-Class tournament of the Kielce region. Brygada unsuccessfully tried to get promoted to the Polish Soccer League. Its most famous player was goalkeeper Adolf Krzyk.
