= Władysław Szczepaniak =

Polish footballer

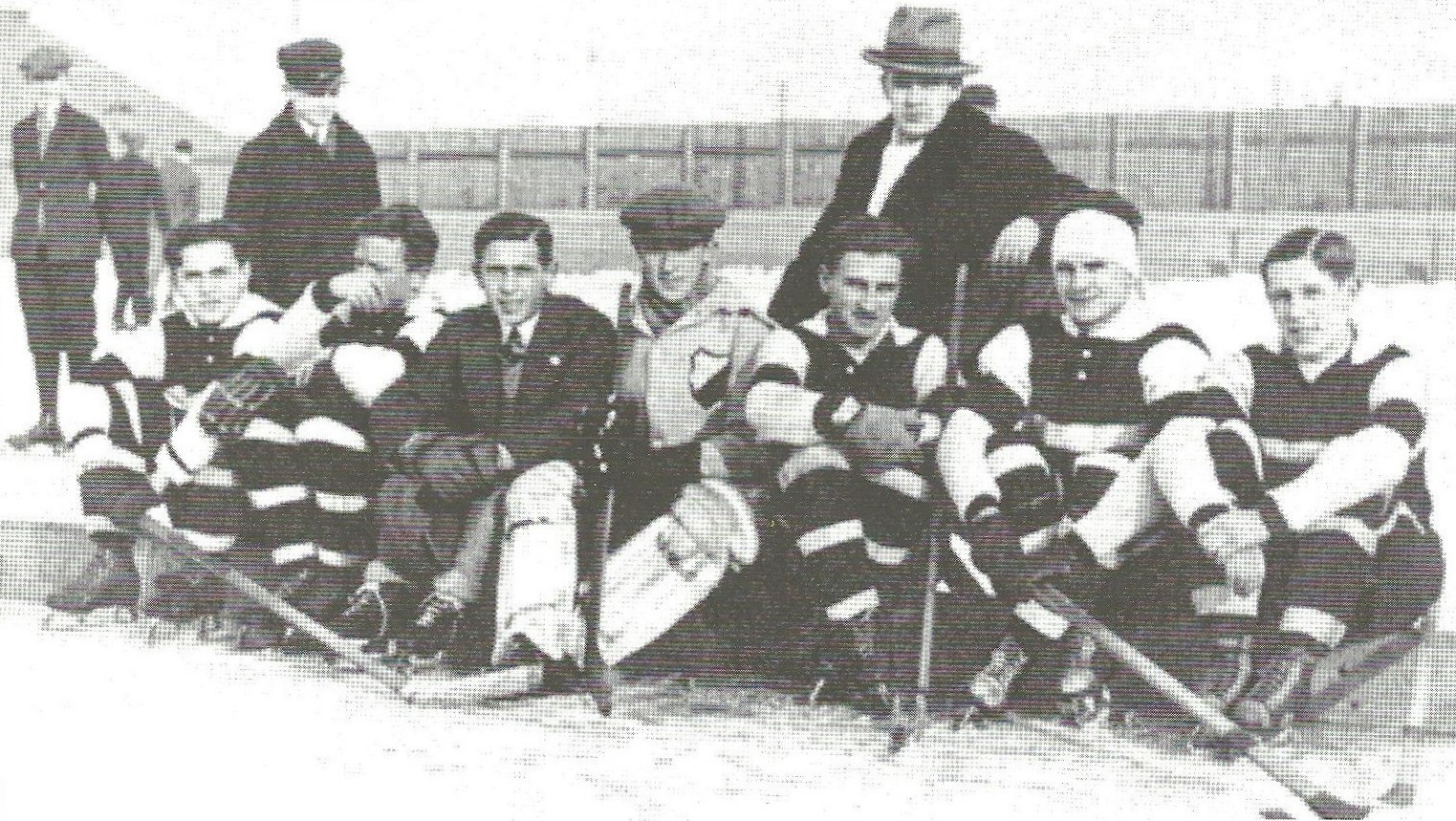
- Szczepaniak, first on the right, as a member of Polonia's hockey team in the early 1930s

Personal information
- Full name: Władysław Szczepaniak
- Date of birth: 19 May 1910
- Place of birth: Warsaw, Congress Poland
- Date of death: 6 May 1979 (aged 68)
- Place of death: Warsaw, Poland
- Height: 1.70 m (5 ft 7 in)
- Position: Defender

Senior career*
Years	Team	Apps	(Gls)
1926–1948	Polonia Warsaw	166	(37)

International career
1930–1947	Poland	34	(0)

Managerial career
- 1948–1949: Gwardia Warsaw
- 1951–1952: Polonia Warsaw
- 1953: Polonia Warsaw
- Pogoń Grodzisk Mazowiecki
- * Club domestic league appearances and goals

Władysław Szczepaniak (19 May 1910 – 6 May 1979) was a Polish footballer. He served as the captain of Polonia Warsaw, a club with which he became a prominent symbol. Szczepaniak also represented the Poland national team.

== Football career ==
Szczepaniak made his debut in 1928 as a forward player. After a few years he moved to defense, becoming one of the pillars of Polonia's team as well as its captain.

His debut for the Poland national team occurred in 1930, during a game against Sweden. His career lasted for almost 20 years. His last game, in 1947, was also against Sweden.

Szczepaniak had a total of 34 caps for the national team, and in most matches was the captain. He participated in the 1936 Summer Olympics, where Poland finished fourth. Also, he was captain in the 1938 FIFA World Cup game of Poland against Brazil. The game was played on 5 June 1938 in Strasbourg, France which Poland lost 5–6.

During the Second World War, he took part in unofficial football championships, despite the fact that the German occupying forces had forbidden the Poles to organise football matches. Under his leadership, the Polonia underground team became the champion of the Warsaw district in 1942 and 1943.

== Death ==
He was laid to rest in a family grave at Bródno Cemetery.

== Honours ==
=== Player ===
Polonia Warsaw

- Ekstraklasa: 1946
- Warsaw Championship: 1942, 1943

=== Manager ===
Polonia Warsaw

- Polish Cup: 1951–52
