= Erwin Nyc =

Polish footballer (1914–1988)

Personal information
- Full name: Erwin Peter Nytz
- Date of birth: 24 May 1914
- Place of birth: Kattowitz (Katowice), German Empire (now Poland)
- Date of death: 1 May 1988 (aged 73)
- Place of death: Piekary Śląskie, Poland
- Height: 1.80 m (5 ft 11 in)
- Position: Midfielder

Senior career*
Years	Team	Apps	(Gls)
1929–1935	Pogoń Katowice		
1935–1939	Polonia Warsaw		
1939	1. FC Katowice		
1940–1941	LSV Markersdorf		
1942–1943	LSV Furstenwalde		
1945–1947	Pogoń Katowice		

International career
1937–1939	Poland	11	(0)

Managerial career
- Raków Częstochowa
- CKS Częstochowa
- Siemianowiczanka Siemianowice
- Polonia Piekary Śląskie
- Górnik Wojkowice
- GKS Świętochłowice
- AKS Chorzów
- * Club domestic league appearances and goals

Erwin Peter Nytz or Edward Piotr Nyc (24 May 1914 – 1 May 1988) was a Polish footballer who played as a midfielder.

Nytz was born 24 May 1914 in Kattowitz (Katowice), German Empire (now Poland). In the late 1930s, Nyc played for Polonia Warsaw, and also represented the Poland national football team. He participated in one of the highest scoring matches in the FIFA World Cup history, a 5–6 loss to Brazil on 5 June 1938 in Strasbourg during the 1938 FIFA World Cup.

During the Second World War, Nyc returned to Upper Silesia, where for a while he played for a German minority team 1. FC Katowice. Called up to the German Army, he continued his career in the military teams of the Luftwaffe and the garrison of Berlin.

After the war, Nyc, unlike many of his fellow Silesian-German soccer players, remained in his homeland under Communist Poland. Initially, he had many problems with the Communist government, which regarded him as a traitor. However, a group of players from Kraków and Warsaw claimed that he had never betrayed Poland and had actively supported Polish underground organizations.

== Name ==
Born Erwin Nytz, after the restoration of Poland's sovereignty he changed his last name back to its Polish version. During the Second World War his last name was again germanized. After the war, this change was annulled.

== See also ==
- Brazil vs Poland at the 1938 FIFA World Cup
