= Ewald Dytko =

Polish footballer (1914–1993)

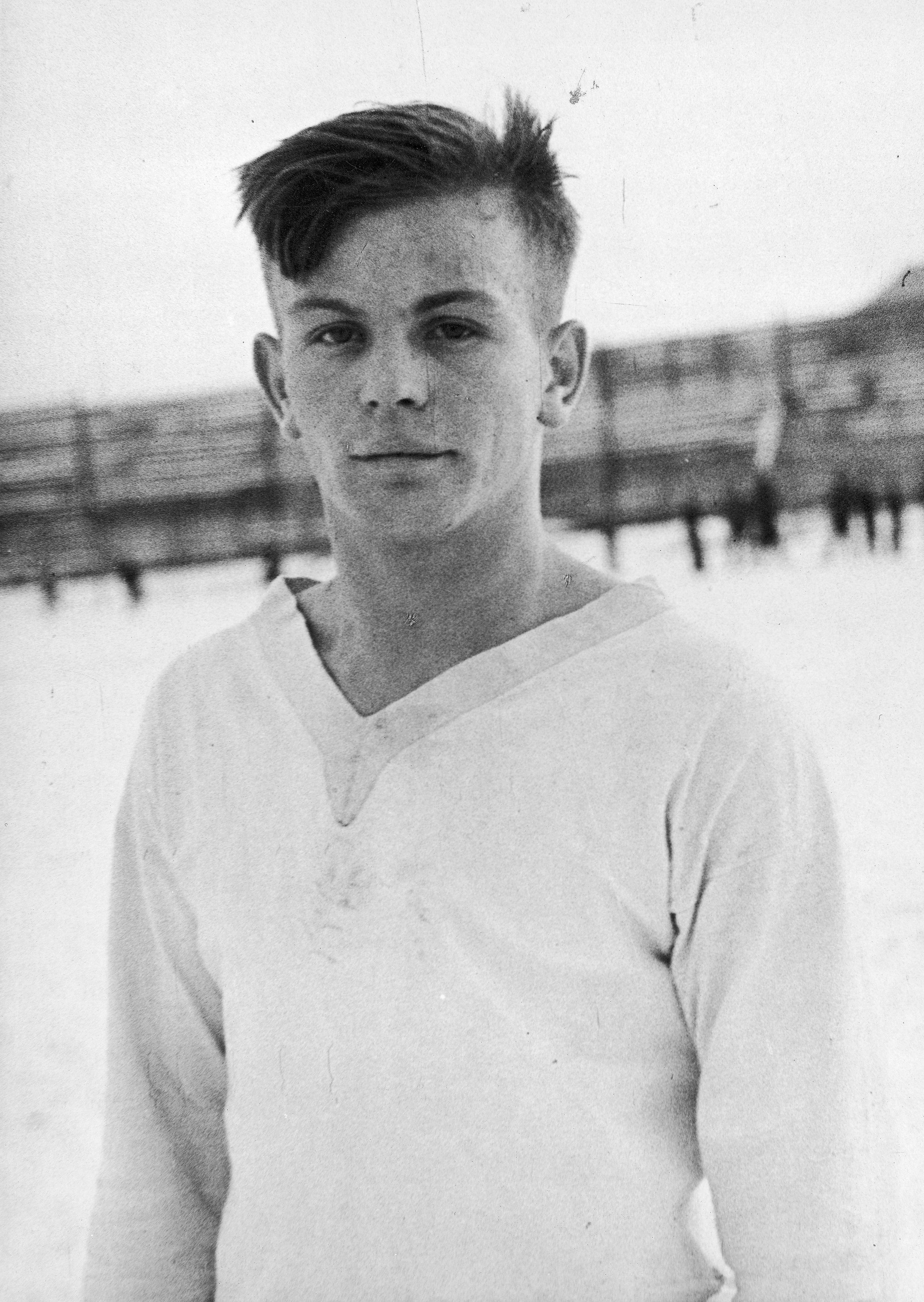
- Portrait of Ewald Dytko

Personal information
- Full name: Ewald Dytko
- Date of birth: 18 October 1914
- Place of birth: Załęże, German Empire
- Date of death: 13 June 1993 (aged 78)
- Place of death: Katowice, Poland
- Position: Midfielder

Youth career
- –1929: Naprzód Załęże

Senior career*
Years	Team	Apps	(Gls)
1931–1939	Dąb Katowice		
1939–1942	1. FC Kattowitz		
1942–1943	TuS Nuendorf		
1945–1950	Baildon Katowice		
1950	Związkowiec Pszczyna		

International career
1935–1939	Poland	22	(0)

Managerial career
- RKS Radzionków
- Walcownia Dziedzice
- RKS Bielsko
- RKS Sośnica
- CKS Czeladź
- Huta Łaziska
- Dąb Katowice
- GKS Katowice
- * Club domestic league appearances and goals

Edward Jan (born Ewald Oskar) Dytko (18 October 1914 – 13 June 1993) was a Polish footballer who played as a midfielder. He represented Poland at international level from 1935 to 1939.

He was born in Załęże (now a district of Katowice), the son of the hewer Johann Dytko and his wife Viktorie née Granek. He played football from an early age. In 1931, he became a player of Dąb Katowice. In 1936, his team was promoted to the Polish top division, but due to Dąb's disqualification, the club was relegated in the middle of the 1937 season.

His national debut occurred on 18 August 1935 in Katowice against Yugoslavia. Soon, Dytko became a key midfield, participating in 25 games. He played in the 1936 Olympic Games in Berlin, appearing in all four fixtures played by the Polish team, and in the 5–6 defeat to Brazil on 5 June 1938 at the 1938 FIFA World Cup in France. On 27 August 1939, Dytko took part in Poland's last interwar match, a 4–2 victory over Hungary.

Dytko is regarded as the co-author of the biggest successes of Polish football in the interwar period.

During the Second World War, he signed the German nationality list (Volksliste) and in 1942 was drafted into the Wehrmacht. In 1944, he was captured by the U.S. Army and kept at a POW camp in Austria.

After the war, he returned to Silesia and his beloved team, representing Dąb until 1950. Like many other inhabitants of Upper Silesia, he had problems with the communist government, which initially treated him as a traitor. He was cleared, but only after signing the declaration of loyalty to the Polish state.

After 1950, he worked as a coach in several Silesian teams, but without major successes. He died in Katowice.

== See also ==
- 1939 Poland v Hungary football match
