= 1937 Ekstraklasa =

17th season of top-tier football league in Poland

Liga
- Season: 1937
- Champions: KS Cracovia (4th title)
- Relegated: Garbarnia Kraków; Dąb Katowice
- Top goalscorer: Artur Woźniak (12 goals)

Statistics of Ekstraklasa for the 1937 season.

== Overview ==
The championship was contested by 10 teams, and the title went to Cracovia.

== League table ==
Pos	Team	Pld	W	D	L	GF	GA	GD	Pts
1	KS Cracovia (C)	16	8	6	2	37	16	+21	22
2	AKS Chorzów	16	8	4	4	31	22	+9	20
3	Ruch Chorzów	16	7	5	4	40	29	+11	19
4	Warta Poznań	16	6	4	6	34	38	−4	16
5	Wisła Kraków	16	6	3	7	30	23	+7	15
6	Pogoń Lwów	16	6	3	7	19	23	−4	15
7	Warszawianka Warszawa	16	6	2	8	28	44	−16	14
8	ŁKS Łódź	16	5	2	9	30	39	−9	12
9	Garbarnia Kraków (R)	16	3	5	8	22	39	−17	11
10	Dąb Katowice (R)	0	-	-	-	-	-	—	0

Source: 90minut.pl (in Polish)
(C) Champions; (R) Relegated

== Results ==
Home \ Away	AKS	CRA	GAR	ŁKS	POG	RUC	WAW	WAR	WIS
AKS Chorzów		2–1	2–1	3–2	0–1	3–1	5–0	5–0	4–2
Cracovia	1–1		1–0	5–0	5–1	4–2	5–0	2–0	1–0
Garbarnia Kraków	0–0	0–4		4–2	1–1	1–1	5–2	1–3	2–0
ŁKS Łódź	2–0	1–1	6–0		0–0	4–3	5–0	1–2	2–0
Pogoń Lwów	0–2	2–0	0–0	2–0		2–1	0–1	6–0	1–0
Ruch Chorzów	0–0	1–1	8–1	4–2	3–2		2–1	6–3	1–0
Warszawianka	4–0	2–2	5–4	2–1	4–1	2–4		3–2	1–2
Warta Poznań	2–2	3–3	3–1	7–0	4–0	1–1	1–1		3–2
Wisła Kraków	5–2	1–1	1–1	6–2	2–0	2–2	5–0	2–0	

Source: 90minut.pl (in Polish)
Legend: Blue = home team win; Yellow = draw; Red = away team win.
