= 1953 Wisła Kraków season =

Wisła Kraków
1953 season
- Chairman: Tadeusz Kozłowski (from 7 November 1953); Grzegorz Łanin (until 7 November 1953)
- Manager: Michał Matyas
- Ekstraklasa: 3rd
- Polish Cup: Unfinished
- Top goalscorer: League: Józef Kohut (10 goals); All: Józef Kohut (10 goals)

The 1953 Wisła Kraków season was the club's 45th year of existence. During this season, the club competed under the name Gwardia Kraków, one of several name changes imposed on Polish football clubs during the communist era. The club participated in the Ekstraklasa, Poland's top division of association football, finishing in 3rd place, and also took part in the Polish Cup. The season's top scorer was Józef Kohut, who netted 10 goals across all competitions. The club also played a number of friendly matches, including games against foreign opposition such as Dynamo Dresden of East Germany.

== Friendlies ==
1 March 1953	Gwardia Kraków (Poland)	4–1	(Poland) Polonia Świdnica	Kraków, Poland
		Report

6 April 1953	Gwardia Kraków (Poland)	0–1	(Poland) Stal Sosnowiec	Kraków, Poland
		Report	Majewski	Stadium: Stadion Gwardii; Attendance: 5,000

27 August 1953	Gwardia Kraków (Poland)	0–1	(Poland) Gwardia Bydgoszcz	Kraków, Poland
		Report	Brzeski	Stadium: Stadion Gwardii

August 1953	Gwardia Kraków (Poland)	2–1	(Poland) Gwardia Koszalin	Kraków, Poland
		Report		Stadium: Stadion Gwardii

6 December 1953	Gwardia Kraków (Poland)	1–5	(Poland) Ogniwo Kraków	Kraków, Poland
11:15 CET (UTC+1)	Kotaba	Report	Wilczkiewicz; Dudoń; Wawrzyniak	Stadium: Stadion Ogniwa; Attendance: 7,000

=== Mixed teams ===
14 May 1953	Gwardia Kraków (Poland)	5–2	(East Germany) Dynamo Dresden	Warsaw, Poland
	Piątek; Kotaba; K. Kościelny; Kohut	Report	Holze; Schröter

15 July 1953	Dynamo Dresden (East Germany)	1–2	(Poland) Gwardia Kraków / Gwardia Warsaw	Frankfurt, East Germany
	Matzen	Report	Piątek; Hachorek

22 July 1953	Gwardia Kraków / Gwardia Warsaw (Poland)	2–2	(Hungary) Budapesti Kinizsi SE	Kraków, Poland
	Jaskowski; Mordarski	Report	Mátrai	Stadium: Stadion Gwardii; Attendance: 35,000; Referee: Franciszek Fronczyk (Tarnów)

23 August 1953	Gwardia Kraków / Gwardia Warsaw (Poland)	1–2	(Czechoslovakia) Červená Hviezda Bratislava	Kraków, Poland
	Kohut 80'	Report	Balážik	Stadium: Stadion Gwardii; Attendance: 20,000; Referee: Julian Mytnik (Kraków)

6 September 1953	Dynamo Dresden (East Germany)	1–1	(Poland) Gwardia Kraków / Gwardia Warsaw	Berlin, East Germany
	Snopkowski 10' (o.g.)	Report	Hachorek 40'	Stadium: Walter-Ulbricht-Stadion; Attendance: 40,000

== Ekstraklasa ==
15 March 1953 1	Gwardia Kraków	2–1	Górnik Radlin	Kraków
15:00 CET (UTC+1)	Mordarski 18' (pen.); Kohut 53'	Report	Wiśniowski 55'	Stadium: Stadion Gwardii; Attendance: 13,000; Referee: Grzegorz Aleksandrowicz (Warsaw)

22 March 1953 2	OWKS Kraków	1–4	Gwardia Kraków	Kraków
16:00 CET (UTC+1)	Kowal 7'	Report	Kohut 20', 54'; W. Kościelny 38'; Mordarski 77'	Stadium: Stadion OWKS-u; Attendance: 20,000; Referee: Szczerzyński (Sosnowiec)

29 March 1953 3	Gwardia Kraków	2–1	Gwardia Warsaw	Kraków
16:00 CET (UTC+1)	Kohut 16'; Mordarski 67'	Report	Hachorek 53'	Stadium: Stadion Gwardii; Attendance: 10,000; Referee: Antoni Nowak (Warsaw)

12 April 1953 4	Ogniwo Kraków	4–2	Gwardia Kraków	Kraków
16:15 CET (UTC+1)	Radoń 47', 72'; Gołąb 74'; Wilczkiewicz 87'	Report	Mordarski 4'; Kohut 67'	Stadium: Stadion Ogniwa; Attendance: 25,000; Referee: Mieczysław Walczak (Łódź)

19 April 1953 5	Gwardia Kraków	1–0	Kolejarz Poznań	Kraków
	W. Kościelny 80'	Report		Stadium: Stadion Gwardii; Attendance: 10,000; Referee: Czesław Małecki (Wrocław)

17 May 1953 6	Gwardia Kraków	4–1	Ogniwo Bytom	Kraków
	Kotaba 15', 76'; Mordarski 58'; Rogoza 73'	Report	Wiśniewski 66'	Stadium: Stadion Gwardii; Attendance: 12,000; Referee: Franciszek Wilczyński (Poznań)

24 May 1953 7	CWKS Warsaw	0–0	Gwardia Kraków	Warsaw
		Report		Stadium: Stadion Wojska Polskiego; Attendance: 6,000; Referee: Alfonsy Cober (Gliwice)

30 May 1953 8	Gwardia Kraków	2–1	Budowlani Gdańsk	Kraków
17:45 CET (UTC+1)	Mordarski 48' (pen.); Gamaj 80'	Report	Goździk 61'	Stadium: Stadion Gwardii; Attendance: 10,000; Referee: Edward Sperling (Łódź)

7 June 1953 9	Budowlani Chorzów	0–3	Gwardia Kraków	Chorzów
		Report	Rogoza 61'; Gamaj 83'; W. Kościelny 85'	Stadium: Stadion AKS-u; Attendance: 15,000; Referee: Zdzisław Hasselbusch (Warsaw)

13 June 1953 10	Gwardia Kraków	3–1	Budowlani Opole	Kraków
17:45 CET (UTC+1)	Kotaba 16', 35'; Gamaj 78'	Report	Żabicki 88'	Stadium: Stadion Gwardii; Attendance: 10,000; Referee: Józef Orliński (Katowice)

21 June 1953 11	Unia Chorzów	4–0	Gwardia Kraków	Chorzów
18:00 CET (UTC+1)	Pala 24', 46'; Cieślik 44'; Alszer 72'	Report		Stadium: Stadion Ruchu; Attendance: 43,000; Referee: Kazimierz Bukowski (Radom)

26 July 1953 12	Kolejarz Poznań	0–0	Gwardia Kraków	Poznań
		Report		Stadium: Stadion na Dębcu; Attendance: 10,000; Referee: Stefan Kulczyk (Sosnowiec)

2 August 1953 13	Budowlani Opole	1–1	Gwardia Kraków	Opole
	Żabicki 67'	Report	Kohut 66'; Piotrowski (red card) 77'	Stadium: Stadion Odry; Attendance: 10,000; Referee: Janusz Marcinkowski (Łódź)

8 August 1953 14	Górnik Radlin	1–2	Gwardia Kraków	Radlin
	Wiśniowski 73' (pen.)	Report	Mordarski 50'; Kohut 62'	Stadium: Stadion Górnika; Attendance: 8,000; Referee: Zdzisław Hasselbusch (Warsaw)

15 August 1953 15	Gwardia Kraków	1–2	OWKS Kraków	Kraków
	Kohut 21'	Report	Piechaczek 32'; Bitner 89'	Stadium: Stadion Gwardii; Attendance: 15,000; Referee: Mieczysław Walczak (Łódź)

19 August 1953 16	Gwardia Kraków	2–1	CWKS Warsaw	Kraków
	Kohut 21'; Rogoza 87'	Report	Szymborski 69' (pen.)	Stadium: Stadion Gwardii; Attendance: 15,000; Referee: Antoni Gorączniak (Poznań)

30 August 1953 17	Gwardia Kraków	0–2	Unia Chorzów	Kraków
16:30 CET (UTC+1)		Report	Cieślik 21'; Alszer 57'	Stadium: Stadion Gwardii; Attendance: 40,000; Referee: Józef Szlejfer (Szczecin)

27 September 1953 18	Budowlani Gdańsk	1–0	Gwardia Kraków	Gdańsk
15:00 CET (UTC+1)	Baran 23'	Report		Stadium: Stadion Budowlanych; Attendance: 12,000; Referee: Józef Orliński (Katowice)

1 October 1953 19	Gwardia Warsaw	1–0	Gwardia Kraków	Warsaw
	Jazłowiecki 80'	Report		Stadium: Stadion Syreny; Attendance: 3,000; Referee: Bolesław Gruszczyński (Kościan)

4 October 1953 20	Ogniwo Bytom	4–0	Gwardia Kraków	Bytom
15:30 CET (UTC+1)	Wiśniewski 2', 15'; Kempny 16'; Więcek 58'	Report		Stadium: Stadion Ogniwa; Attendance: 10,000; Referee: Jerzy Hasselbusch (Warsaw)

8 October 1953 21	Gwardia Kraków	3–0	Ogniwo Kraków	Kraków
15:00 CET (UTC+1)	Glimas (o.g.); Mordarski; Kohut	Report		Stadium: Stadion Gwardii; Attendance: 15,000; Referee: Józef Kowal (Katowice)

8 November 1953 22	Gwardia Kraków	3–2	Budowlani Chorzów	Kraków
11:00 CET (UTC+1)	Kotaba 5', 35'; Rogoza 8'	Report	Wieczorek ??' (pen.); Powała ??'	Stadium: Stadion Gwardii; Attendance: 5,000; Referee: Zygmunt Frąckowski (Wrocław)

== 1953-54 Polish Cup ==
15 November 1953 Round of 64	Dąbski KS	0–7	Gwardia Kraków	Kraków
		Report	Rogoza; Jaskowski; Kościelny; Kotaba

22 November 1953 Round of 32	Gwardia Kraków	0–0	Kolejarz Warsaw	Kraków
11:15 CET (UTC+1)		Report		Stadium: Stadion Gwardii

29 November 1953 Round of 32	Kolejarz Warsaw	0–1	Gwardia Warsaw	Warsaw
		Report	Mordarski 74' (pen.)	Stadium: Stadion Polonii; Attendance: 8,000; Referee: Stefan Kulczyk (Sosnowiec)

== Squad, appearances and goals ==
No.	Pos	Nat	Player	Total		Ekstraklasa		Polish Cup	
No.	Pos	Nat	Player	Apps	Goals	Apps	Goals	Apps	Goals
	GK	(Poland) POL	Jerzy Jurowicz	23	0	21+0	0	2+0	0
	GK	(Poland) POL	Stanisław Kalisz	1	0	1+0	0	0+0	0
	GK	(Poland) POL	Zbigniew Lech	1	0	0+1	0	0+0	0
	DF	(Poland) POL	Stanisław Flanek	21	0	19+0	0	2+0	0
	DF	(Poland) POL	Jerzy Piotrowski	10	0	7+1	0	2+0	0
	DF	(Poland) POL	Edward Szymeczko	1	0	1+0	0	0+0	0
	DF	(Poland) POL	Antoni Talik	11	0	8+1	0	1+1	0
	DF	(Poland) POL	Eugeniusz Wójcik	4	0	4+0	0	0+0	0
	MF	(Poland) POL	Ryszard Jędrys	24	0	21+0	0	3+0	0
	MF	(Poland) POL	Włodzimierz Kościelny	19	4	17+0	3	2+0	1
	MF	(Poland) POL	Zbigniew Kotaba	25	7	20+2	6	3+0	1
	MF	(Poland) POL	Leszek Snopkowski	25	0	22+0	0	3+0	0
	MF	(Poland) POL	Mieczysław Szczurek	21	0	20+0	0	1+0	0
	MF	(Poland) POL	Kazimierz Ślizowski	7	0	7+0	0	0+0	0
	FW	(Poland) POL	Wiesław Gamaj	9	3	7+2	3	0+0	0
	FW	(Poland) POL	Mieczysław Gracz	4	0	1+3	0	0+0	0
	FW	(Poland) POL	Zbigniew Jaskowski	21	2	16+2	0	3+0	2
	FW	(Poland) POL	Józef Kohut	16	10	13+1	10	1+1	0
	FW	(Poland) POL	Zdzisław Mordarski	23	9	19+1	8	3+0	1
	FW	(Poland) POL	Antoni Rogoza	22	7	18+1	4	3+0	3

=== Goalscorers ===
Place	Position	Nation	Name	Ekstraklasa	Polish Cup	Total
1	FW	(Poland)	Józef Kohut	10	0	10
2	FW	(Poland)	Zdzisław Mordarski	8	1	9
3	MF	(Poland)	Antoni Rogoza	4	3	7
3	FW	(Poland)	Zbigniew Kotaba	6	1	7
5	MF	(Poland)	Włodzimierz Kościelny	3	1	4
6	FW	(Poland)	Wiesław Gamaj	3	0	3
7	FW	(Poland)	Zbigniew Jaskowski	0	2	2
7	DF	(Poland)	Tadeusz Glimas	1 (o.g.)	0	1
			TOTALS	35	8	43

=== Disciplinary record ===
Name	Nation	Position	Ekstraklasa	Polish Cup	Ekstraklasa Cup	Total
Name	Nation	Position	Sent off (straight red)	Sent off (straight red)	Sent off (straight red)	
Jerzy Piotrowski	(Poland)	DF	1	0	0	1
