= 1954 Wisła Kraków season =

Wisła Kraków
1954 season
- Chairman: Tadeusz Kozłowski
- Manager: Czesław Skoraczyński & Mieczysław Gracz (from 31 July); Michał Matyas (until 31 July)
- Ekstraklasa: 8th
- Polish Cup: Runner-up
- Top goalscorer: League: Zdzisław Mordarski (5 goals); All: Zdzisław Mordarski (6 goals)

The 1954 season was Wisła Kraków's 46th year as a club. Wisła was under the name of Gwardia Kraków.

== Friendlies ==
7 March 1954	Gwardia Kraków (Poland)	5–1	(Poland) Włókniarz Kraków	Kraków, Poland
	Rogoza; Kohut; Mamoń; Gamaj	Report	Czyż

11 April 1954	Gwardia Kraków (Poland)	0–3	(Poland) Gwardia Kielce	Kraków, Poland
		Report

18 April 1954	Gwardia Kraków (Poland)	2–0	(Poland) Ogniwo Kraków	Kraków, Poland
	Kohut	Report

16 May 1954	Ogniwo Tarnów (Poland)	2–2	(Poland) Gwardia Kraków	Tarnów, Poland
		Report

10 June 1954	Gwardia Kraków (Poland)	2–5	Poland B	Kraków, Poland
	Budek; Machowski	Report	Słyś; Golec; Piątek; Kubocz	Stadium: Stadion Gwardii; Attendance: 10,000; Referee: Władysław Połaniecki (Kraków)

22 August 1954	Budowlani Opole (Poland)	2–3	(Poland) Gwardia Kraków	Opole, Poland
	Szymborski	Report	K. Kościelny; Machowski	Attendance: 5,000; Referee: Świrski (Opole)

29 August 1954	Włókniarz Kraków (Poland)	0–0	(Poland) Gwardia Kraków	Kraków, Poland
		Report

12 December 1954	Włókniarz Kraków (Poland)	4–0	(Poland) Gwardia Kraków	Kraków, Poland
	Kucharski; Derciński; Czyż	Report		Attendance: 5,000; Referee: Władysław Połaniecki (Kraków)

== Ekstraklasa ==
14 March 1954 1	Gwardia Kraków	3–0	Gwardia Warsaw	Kraków
	Kohut 4'; Kotaba 66'; Mordarski 89'	Report		Stadium: Stadion Gwardii; Attendance: 13,000; Referee: Stefan Kulczyk (Sosnowiec)

21 March 1954 2	Kolejarz Poznań	0–1	Gwardia Kraków	Poznań
		Report	Mordarski 77' (pen.)	Stadium: Stadion na Dębcu; Attendance: 15,000; Referee: Włodzimierz Storoniak (Katowice)

28 March 1954 3	Gwardia Kraków	0–1	Górnik Radlin	Kraków
	Rogoza (penalty missed) 83'	Report	Jankowski 80'	Stadium: Stadion Gwardii; Attendance: 10,000; Referee: Aleksander Cyprys (Opole)

4 April 1954 4	Unia Chorzów	1–0	Gwardia Kraków	Chorzów
	Gebur 80'	Report		Attendance: 40,000; Referee: Czesław Buśkiewicz (Warsaw)

26 May 1954 5	Gwardia Kraków	2–1	CWKS Warsaw	Kraków
	Gamaj 41'; Mordarski 60'	Report	Janeczek 17'	Stadium: Stadion Gwardii; Attendance: 15,000; Referee: Marian Nalepa (Zabrze)

30 May 1954 6	Gwardia Bydgoszcz	0–1	Gwardia Kraków	Bydgoszcz
		Report	Machowski 55'	Attendance: 5,000; Referee: Józef Kowal (Katowice)

6 June 1954 7	Gwardia Kraków	2–0	Włókniarz Łódź	Kraków
	Mordarski 42'; Machowski 65'	Report		Stadium: Stadion Gwardii; Attendance: 20,000; Referee: Alfonsy Cober (Gliwice)

13 June 1954 8	Ogniwo Bytom	2–0	Gwardia Kraków	Bytom
	Wiśniewski 41'; Kempny 81'	Report		Stadium: Stadion Ogniwa; Attendance: 30,000; Referee: Edward Sperling (Łódź)

17 June 1954 9	Gwardia Kraków	1–2	Budowlani Chorzów	Kraków
	W. Kościelny 17'	Report	Lizurek 45'; Piechaczek 62'	Stadium: Stadion Gwardii; Attendance: 10,000; Referee: Zbigniew Matuszewski (Bydgoszcz)

20 June 1954 10	Ogniwo Kraków	1–1	Gwardia Kraków	Kraków
18:15 CET (UTC+1)	Radoń 57'	Report	Mordarski 20'	Stadium: Stadion Cracovii; Attendance: 20,000; Referee: Józef Orliński (Katowice)

5 September 1954 11	Gwardia Kraków	2–1	Unia Chorzów	Kraków
	Mordarski 48' (pen.); W. Kościelny ??'	Report	Kubicki 33'	Stadium: Stadion Gwardii; Attendance: 20,000; Referee: Józef Szlejfer (Szczecin)
Note: The match was canceled. Re-played on 24 October 1954.

19 September 1954 12	CWKS Warsaw	1–0	Gwardia Kraków	Warsaw
	Pohl 44'	Report		Stadium: Stadion Wojska Polskiego; Attendance: 10,000; Referee: Alfonsy Cober (Gliwice)

3 October 1954 13	Gwardia Kraków	0–3	Gwardia Bydgoszcz	Kraków
		Report	Norkowski 1'; Piątek ??'; Brzeski ??'	Stadium: Stadion Gwardii; Attendance: 10,000; Referee: Antoni Marszoł (Chorzów)

10 October 1954 14	Włókniarz Łódź	1–0	Gwardia Kraków	Łódź
	Kubocz 81'	Report		Stadium: Stadion ŁKS-u; Attendance: 30,000; Referee: Józef Kowal (Katowice)

17 October 1954 15	Gwardia Kraków	2–2	Ogniwo Bytom	Kraków
15:00 CET (UTC+1)	Adamczyk 57'; Gamaj 60'	Report	Ciupa ??'; Sąsiadek 20'	Stadium: Stadion Gwardii; Attendance: 20,000; Referee: Grzegorz Aleksandrowicz (Warsaw)

24 October 1954 11 - Replayed	Gwardia Kraków	1–0	Unia Chorzów	Kraków
12:00 CET (UTC+1)	Kotaba 32'	Report		Stadium: Stadion Gwardii; Attendance: 25,000; Referee: Zdzisław Hasselbusch (Warsaw)

31 October 1954 16	Gwardia Kraków	0–0	Ogniwo Kraków	Kraków
12:00 CET (UTC+1)		Report		Stadium: Stadion Gwardii; Attendance: 20,000; Referee: Włodzimierz Storoniak (Katowice)

7 November 1954 17	Budowlani Chorzów	1–1	Gwardia Kraków	Chorzów
	Janduda 88'	Report	Gamaj 43'	Attendance: 10,000; Referee: Antoni Gorączniak (Poznań)

14 November 1954 18	Górnik Radlin	3–1	Gwardia Kraków	Radlin
	Jankowski 48'; Wiśniowski 68', 85'	Report	Gamaj 28'	Attendance: 6,000; Referee: Tadeusz Nowak (Kielce)

21 November 1954 19	Gwardia Warsaw	1–0	Gwardia Kraków	Warsaw
12:00 CET (UTC+1)	Hachorek 44'	Report		Stadium: Stadion Skry; Attendance: 5,000; Referee: Józef Szlejfer (Szczecin)

28 November 1954 20	Gwardia Kraków	3–0	Kolejarz Poznań	Kraków
12:00 CET (UTC+1)	Adamczyk 10'; Kohut 27'; Flanek 37'	Report		Stadium: Stadion Gwardii; Attendance: 20,000; Referee: Stefan Paszkowski (Warsaw)

== 1953-54 Polish Cup ==
25 April 1954 Round of 16	Gwardia Kraków	3–2 (a.e.t.)	Ogniwo Bytom	Kraków
	W. Kościelny 11'; Kohut 70'; Jaskowski 125'	Report	Cichoń ??'; Wiśniewski ??'	Stadium: Stadion Gwardii; Attendance: 15,000; Referee: Janusz Marcinkowski (Łódź)

25 April 1954 Quarterfinal	Gwardia Kraków	2–0	Górnik Bytom	Kraków
	Mordarski 13'; Machowski 14'	Report		Stadium: Stadion Gwardii; Attendance: 10,000; Referee: Zygmunt Frąckowski (Olsztyn)

18 July 1954 Semifinal	Stal Sosnowiec	1–2	Gwardia Kraków	Warsaw
	Krężel	Report	W. Kościelny 68'; Machowski 70'	Stadium: Stadion Polonii; Attendance: 8,000; Referee: Kazimierz Bukowski (Radom)

25 July 1954 Final	Gwardia Warsaw	0–0 (a.e.t.)	Gwardia Kraków	Warsaw
		Report		Stadium: Stadion Wojska Polskiego; Attendance: 30,000; Referee: Józef Kowal (Katowice)
Note: The match lasted 120 minutes.

9 September 1954 Final	Gwardia Warsaw	3–1	Gwardia Kraków	Wrocław
	Hachorek 2', 22'; Baszkiewicz 51'	Report	W. Kościelny 88'	Stadium: Stadion Olimpijski; Attendance: 20,000; Referee: Marian Nalepa (Zabrze)

== Squad, appearances and goals ==
No.	Pos	Nat	Player	Total		Ekstraklasa		Polish Cup	
No.	Pos	Nat	Player	Apps	Goals	Apps	Goals	Apps	Goals
	GK	(Poland) POL	Jerzy Jurowicz	11	0	10+0	0	1+0	0
	GK	(Poland) POL	Stanisław Kalisz	4	0	4+0	0	0+0	0
	GK	(Poland) POL	Zbigniew Lech	11	0	6+0	0	4+1	0
	DF	(Poland) POL	Stanisław Flanek	25	1	20+0	1	5+0	0
	DF	(Poland) POL	Tadeusz Miksa	9	0	7+1	0	1+0	0
	DF	(Poland) POL	Jerzy Piotrowski	22	0	17+0	0	5+0	0
	DF	(Poland) POL	Edward Szymeczko	1	0	1+0	0	0+0	0
	MF	(Poland) POL	Kazimierz Budek	1	0	0+1	0	0+0	0
	MF	(Poland) POL	Ryszard Jędrys	9	0	9+0	0	0+0	0
	MF	(Poland) POL	Włodzimierz Kościelny	13	4	8+0	1	5+0	3
	MF	(Poland) POL	Zbigniew Kotaba	14	2	11+1	2	1+1	0
	MF	(Poland) POL	Marian Machowski	19	4	14+1	2	4+0	2
	MF	(Poland) POL	Józef Mamoń	23	0	18+0	0	5+0	0
	MF	(Poland) POL	Leszek Snopkowski	22	0	17+0	0	4+1	0
	MF	(Poland) POL	Mieczysław Szczurek	17	0	13+0	0	4+0	0
	MF	(Poland) POL	Kazimierz Ślizowski	6	0	5+0	0	1+0	0
	MF	(Poland) POL	Jan Wapiennik	2	0	1+1	0	0+0	0
	FW	(Poland) POL	Stanisław Adamczyk	10	2	8+2	2	0+0	0
	FW	(Poland) POL	Wiesław Gamaj	24	4	18+1	4	4+1	0
	FW	(Poland) POL	Zbigniew Jaskowski	5	1	1+1	0	2+1	1
	FW	(Poland) POL	Józef Kohut	19	3	11+3	2	4+1	1
	FW	(Poland) POL	Zdzisław Mordarski	20	6	16+0	5	4+0	1
	FW	(Poland) POL	Antoni Rogoza	8	0	5+2	0	1+0	0

=== Goalscorers ===
Place	Position	Nation	Name	Ekstraklasa	Polish Cup	Total
1	FW	(Poland)	Zdzisław Mordarski	5	1	6
2	FW	(Poland)	Wiesław Gamaj	4	0	4
2	MF	(Poland)	Marian Machowski	2	2	4
2	MF	(Poland)	Włodzimierz Kościelny	1	3	4
5	FW	(Poland)	Józef Kohut	2	1	3
6	FW	(Poland)	Stanisław Adamczyk	2	0	2
6	MF	(Poland)	Zbigniew Kotaba	2	0	2
8	DF	(Poland)	Stanisław Flanek	1	0	1
8	FW	(Poland)	Zbigniew Jaskowski	0	1	1
			Total	19	8	27
