= List of Polish football champions =

The Polish football champions are the annual winners of Poland's premier annual football competition. The title has been contested since 1920 in varying forms of competition. From 1921 to 1926 the championship was decided in a series of tournaments until the league was formed in 1927. Since then the title was awarded the winners of the highest league in Polish football. In 1951 the title was awarded to the winner of the Polish Cup.

== Pre-independence era (1913–1914) ==
Before Poland regained its independence in 1918, Polish clubs had held their own championships in Austrian and Prussian partitions.

=== Galicia (Austrian partition) ===
Competitions were organized by the original Polish Football Association, which was part of the Austrian Football Association.

Season	Champions	Runners-up	Third Place	Top scorer(s)
1913	Cracovia	Wisła Kraków	Pogoń Lwów	Józef Kałuża (Cracovia); Władysław Kuchar (Pogoń Lwów); Antoni Poznański (Cracovia): 2
1914	Tournament abandoned due to the First World War			

=== Province of Posen (Prussian partition) ===
Competitions were organized by Association of Polish Sports Societies for the German Reich (now Greater Poland Football Association, a part of Polish Football Association).

Not to be confused with Posen Football Championship, the regional competition organized by South Eastern German Association, a part of German Football Association in 1908–1914.

Season	Champions (number of titles)	Runners-up	Third Place
1913	Warta Poznań	Posnania	Ostrovia
1914	Warta Poznań (2)	Posnania	Ostrovia (Note: Did not play any matches despite being in the competition.)
1919	Unia Poznań	Warta Poznań	Posnania

== Under German occupation (1940–1944) ==
=== Warsaw Championship ===
Season	Champions	Runners-up	Third Place
1942	Polonia Warsaw	Okęcie Warsaw	Olimpia Warsaw
1943	Polonia Warsaw (2)	Piaseczno	Marymont Warsaw
1944	Tournament abandoned due to the Warsaw Uprising		

=== Kraków Championship ===
Season	Champions	Runners-up	Third Place
1940	Wisła Kraków	Zwierzyniecki Kraków	Garbarnia Kraków
1941	Wisła Kraków (2)	Cracovia	AKS Kraków
1943	Cracovia	Wisła Kraków	Garbarnia Kraków
1944	Tournament abandoned due to the Warsaw Uprising		

== List of champions ==
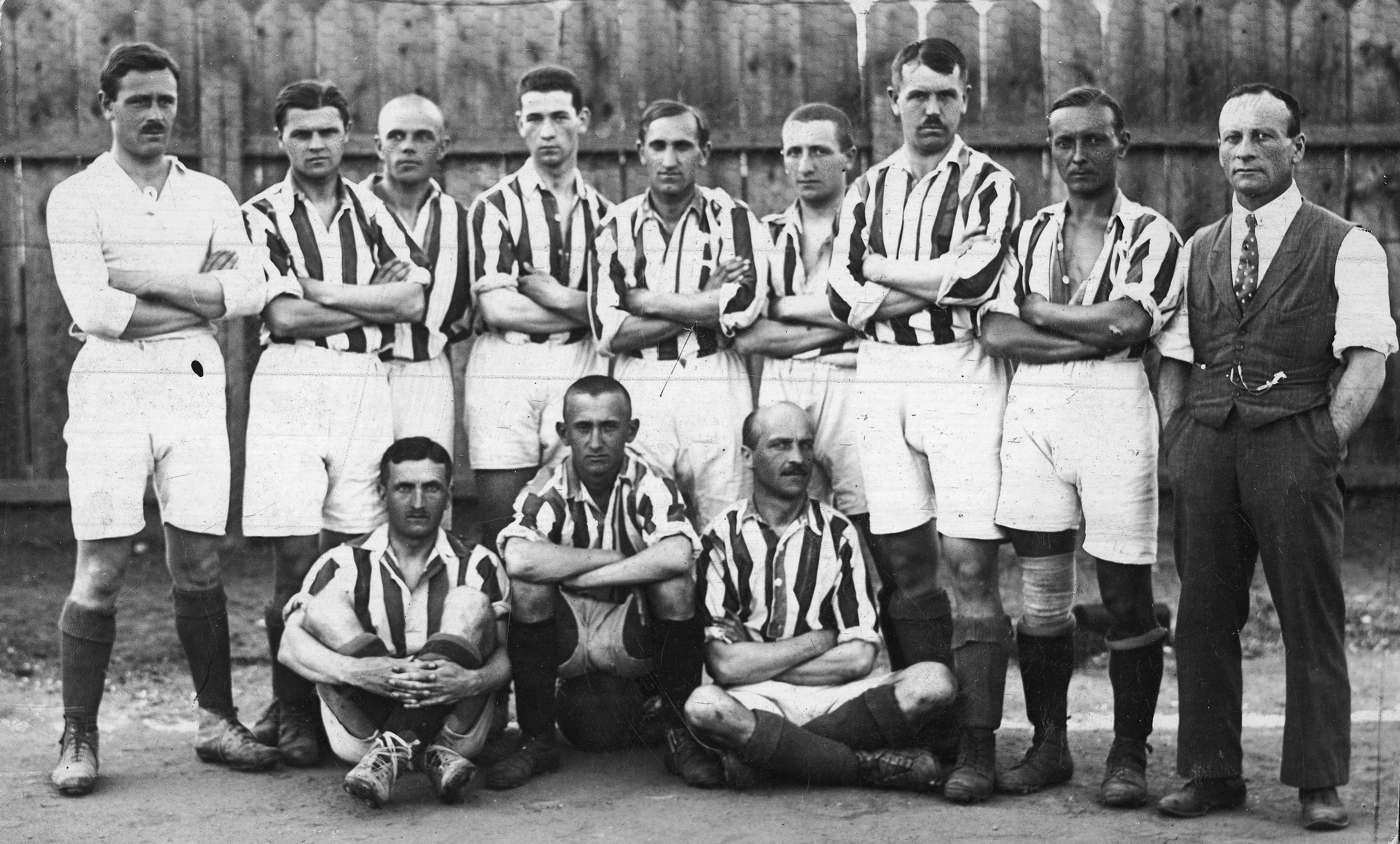

Cracovia, 1921 champions

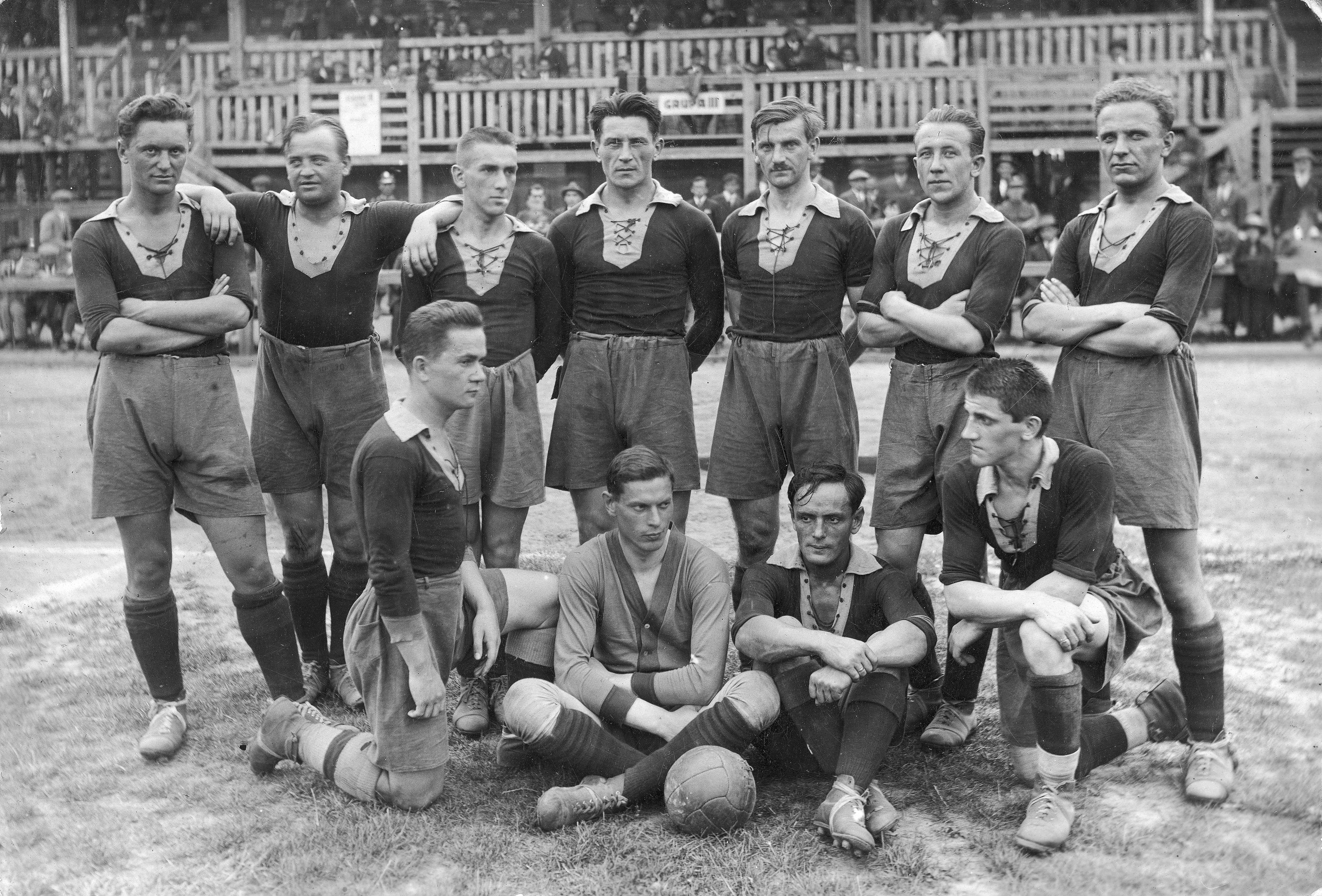

Pogoń Lwów, 1926 champions

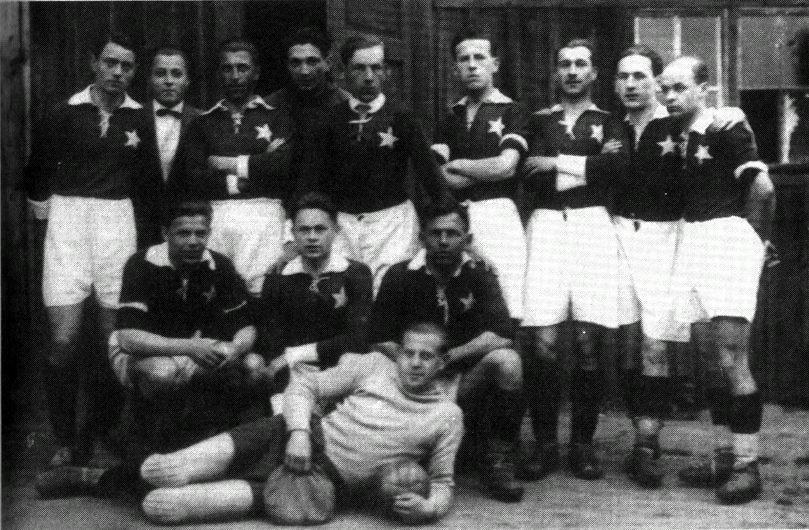

Wisła Kraków, 1927 champions

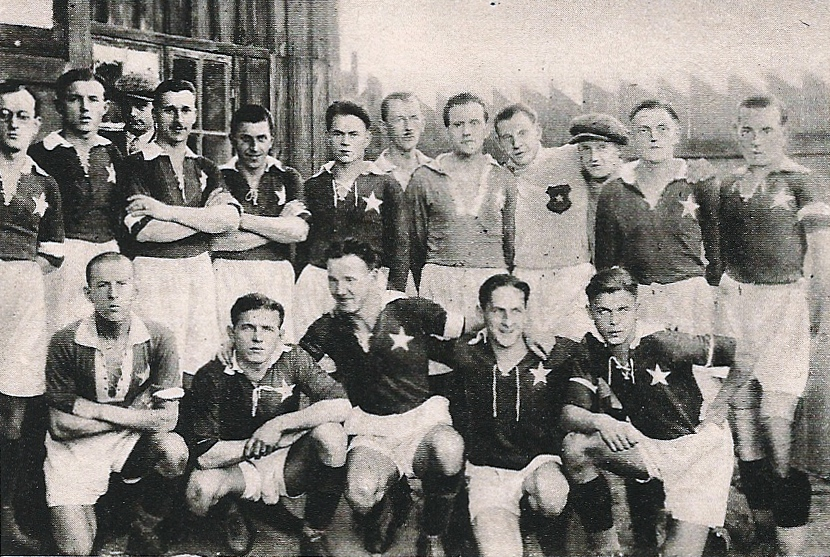

Wisła Kraków, 1928 champions

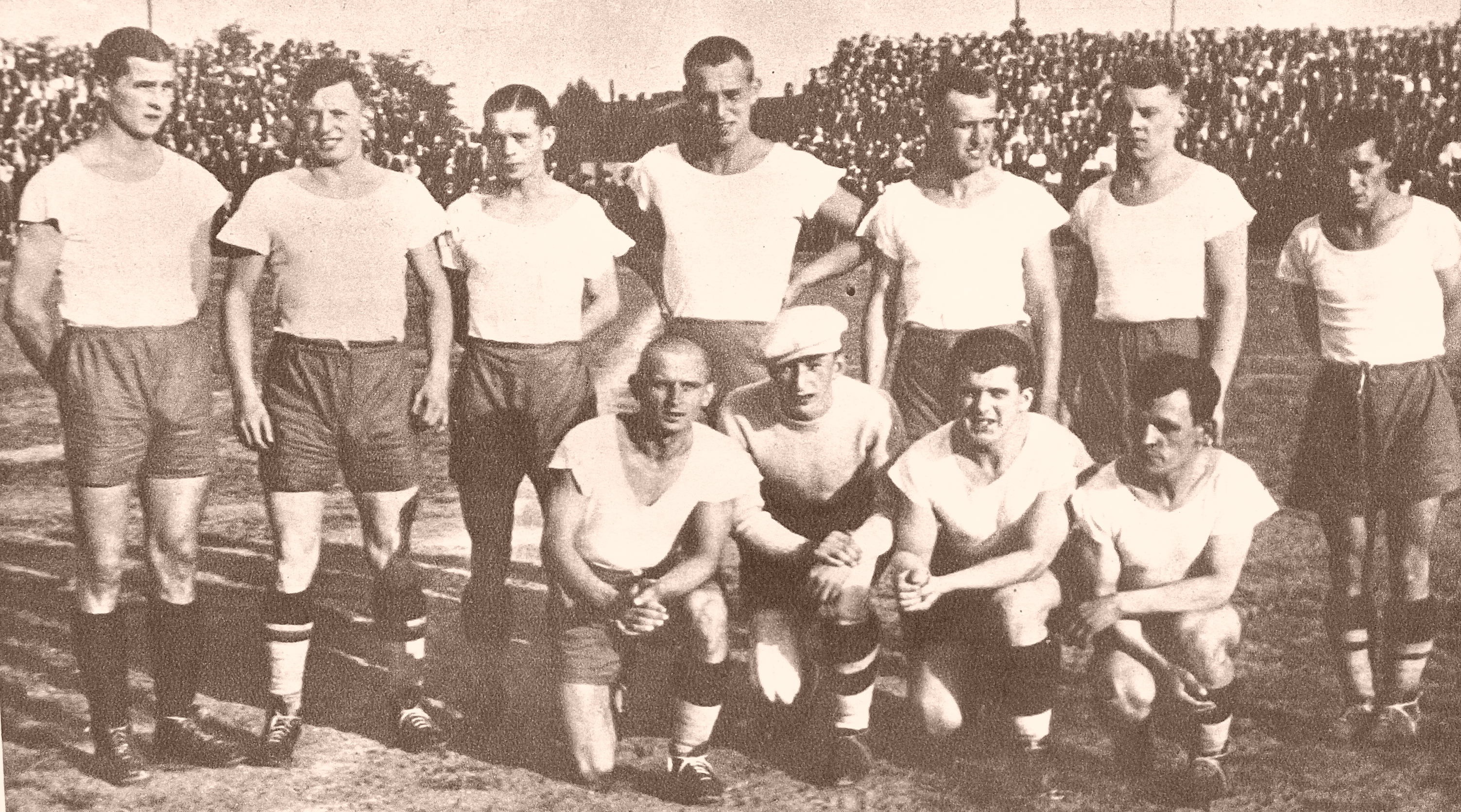

Ruch Chorzów, 1938 champions

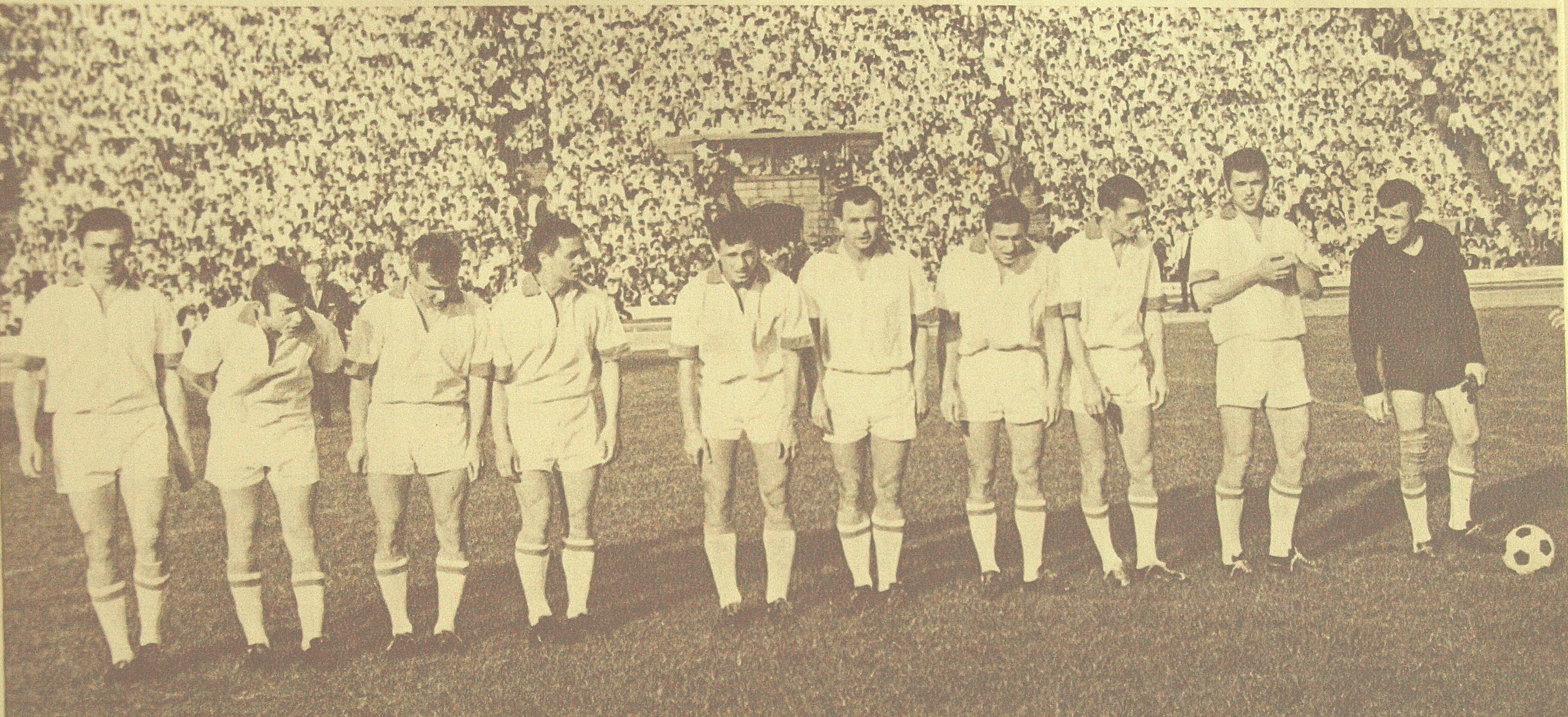

Ruch Chorzów, 1967–68 champions

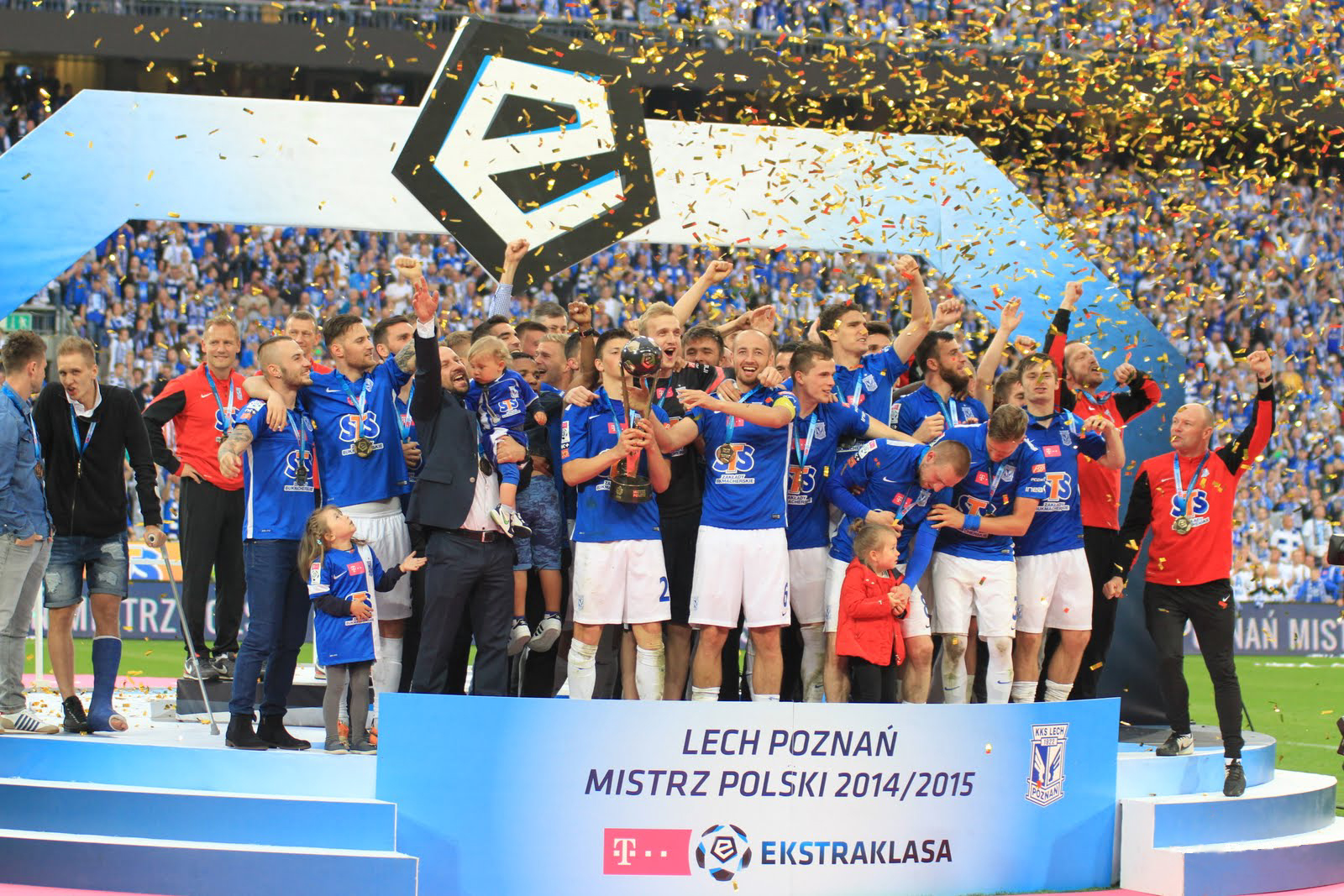

Lech Poznań, 2014–15 champions

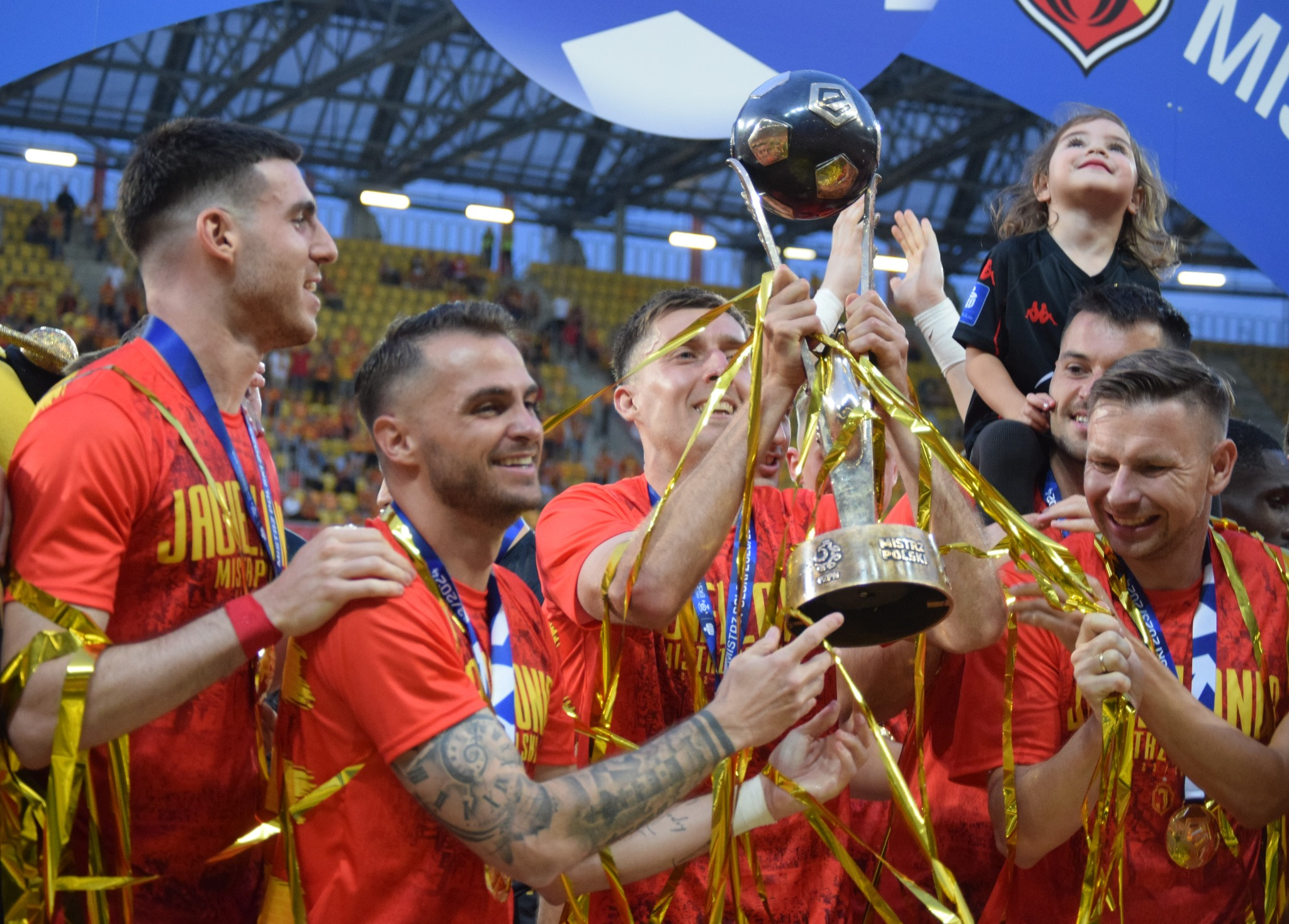

Jagiellonia Białystok, 2023–24 champions

The performance of various clubs is shown in the following table:

Season	Champions (number of titles)	Runners-up	Third Place	Top scorer(s)
1920	Final tournament not played due to the Polish–Soviet War.			
1921	Cracovia	Polonia Warsaw	Warta Poznań	Józef Kałuża (Cracovia): 9
1922	Pogoń Lwów	Warta Poznań	Cracovia and ŁKS Łódź	Wacław Kuchar (Pogoń Lwów): 21
1923	Pogoń Lwów (2)	Wisła Kraków	Polonia Warsaw and Warta Poznań	Mieczysław Batsch (Pogoń Lwów): 17
1924	Not played due to the 1924 Summer Olympics in Paris.			
1925	Pogoń Lwów (3)	Warta Poznań	Wisła Kraków	Henryk Reyman (Wisła Kraków): 11
1926	Pogoń Lwów (4)	Polonia Warsaw	Warta Poznań	Józef Garbień (Pogoń Lwów), Wacław Kuchar (Pogoń Lwów): 11
1927	Wisła Kraków	1. FC Katowice	Warta Poznań	Henryk Reyman (Wisła Kraków): 37
1928	Wisła Kraków (2)	Warta Poznań	Legia Warsaw	Ludwik Gintel (Cracovia): 28
1929	Warta Poznań	Garbarnia Kraków	Wisła Kraków	Rochus Nastula (Czarni Lwów): 25
1930	Cracovia (2)	Wisła Kraków	Legia Warsaw	Karol Kossok (Cracovia): 24
1931	Garbarnia Kraków	Wisła Kraków	Legia Warsaw	Walerian Kisieliński (Wisła Kraków): 24
1932	Cracovia (3)	Pogoń Lwów	Warta Poznań	Kajetan Kryszkiewicz (Warta Poznań): 16
1933	Ruch Wielkie Hajduki	Pogoń Lwów	Wisła Kraków	Artur Woźniak (Wisła Kraków): 19
1934	Ruch Wielkie Hajduki (2)	Cracovia	Wisła Kraków	Ernest Wilimowski (Ruch Wielkie Hajduki): 33
1935	Ruch Wielkie Hajduki (3)	Pogoń Lwów	Warta Poznań	Michał Matyas (Pogoń Lwów): 22
1936	Ruch Wielkie Hajduki (4)	Wisła Kraków	Warta Poznań	Teodor Peterek (Ruch Wielkie Hajduki), Ernest Wilimowski (Ruch Wielkie Hajduki): 18
1937	Cracovia (4)	AKS Chorzów	Ruch Wielkie Hajduki	Artur Woźniak (Wisła Kraków): 12
1938	Ruch Wielkie Hajduki (5)	Warta Poznań	Wisła Kraków	Teodor Peterek (Ruch Wielkie Hajduki): 21
1939	Season abandoned due to the Second World War.			Ernest Wilimowski (Ruch Wielkie Hajduki): 26
1940–45	Not played due to the Second World War.			
1946	Polonia Warsaw	Warta Poznań	AKS Chorzów	Henryk Spodzieja (AKS Chorzów): 8
1947	Warta Poznań (2)	Wisła Kraków	AKS Chorzów	Mieczysław Gracz (Wisła Kraków): 4
1948	Cracovia (5)	Wisła Kraków	Ruch Chorzów	Józef Kohut (Wisła Kraków): 31
1949	Gwardia Kraków (3)	Ogniwo Kraków	Kolejarz Poznań	Teodor Anioła (Kolejarz Poznań): 21
1950	Gwardia Kraków (4)	Unia Chorzów	Kolejarz Poznań	Teodor Anioła (Kolejarz Poznań): 20
1951 (Note: In 1951, the Polish Football Association decided to give the Champion of Poland title to the winner of the Polish Cup, in order to increase the importance of the re-activated cup competition. Unia Chorzów was 6th in the league, but won the cup, beating 2-0 Gwardia Kraków in the final game. However, in the league, Gwardia Kraków was first, Górnik Radlin second and CWKS Warsaw third.)	Unia Chorzów (6)	Gwardia Kraków	Budowlani Chorzów and Kolejarz Warsaw	Henryk Spodzieja (Budowlani Chorzów): 7
1952	Unia Chorzów (7)	Ogniwo Bytom	Ogniwo Kraków	Gerard Cieślik (Unia Chorzów): 11
1953	Unia Chorzów (8)	OWKS Kraków	Wisła Kraków	Gerard Cieślik (Unia Chorzów): 24
1954	Ogniwo Bytom	ŁKS-Włókniarz Łódź	Unia Chorzów	Ernest Pol (CWKS Warsaw): 24
1955	CWKS Warsaw	Stal Sosnowiec	Unia-Ruch Chorzów	Stanisław Hachorek (Gwardia Warsaw): 16
1956	CWKS Warsaw (2)	Ruch Chorzów	Lechia Gdańsk	Henryk Kempny (CWKS Warsaw): 21
1957	Górnik Zabrze	Gwardia Warszawa	ŁKS Łódź	Lucjan Brychczy (Legia Warsaw): 19
1958	ŁKS Łódź	Polonia Bytom	Górnik Zabrze	Władysław Soporek (ŁKS Łódź): 19
1959	Górnik Zabrze (2)	Polonia Bytom	Gwardia Warszawa	Jan Liberda (Polonia Bytom), Ernest Pol (Górnik Zabrze): 21
1960	Ruch Chorzów (9)	Legia Warsaw	Górnik Zabrze	Marian Norkowski (Polonia Bydgoszcz): 17
1961	Górnik Zabrze (3)	Polonia Bytom	Legia Warsaw	Ernest Pol (Górnik Zabrze): 24
1962	Polonia Bytom (2)	Górnik Zabrze	Zagłębie Sosnowiec	Jan Liberda (Polonia Bytom): 16
1962–63	Górnik Zabrze (4)	Ruch Chorzów	Zagłębie Sosnowiec	Marian Kielec (Pogoń Szczecin): 18
1963–64	Górnik Zabrze (5)	Zagłębie Sosnowiec	Odra Opole	Lucjan Brychczy (Legia Warsaw), Józef Gałeczka (Zagłębie Sosnowiec), Jerzy Wilim (Szombierki Bytom): 18
1964–65	Górnik Zabrze (6)	Szombierki Bytom	Zagłębie Sosnowiec	Lucjan Brychczy (Legia Warsaw): 20
1965–66	Górnik Zabrze (7)	Wisła Kraków	Polonia Bytom	Włodzimierz Lubański (Górnik Zabrze): 23
1966–67	Górnik Zabrze (8)	Zagłębie Sosnowiec	Ruch Chorzów	Włodzimierz Lubański (Górnik Zabrze): 18
1967–68	Ruch Chorzów (10)	Legia Warsaw	Górnik Zabrze	Włodzimierz Lubański (Górnik Zabrze): 24
1968–69	Legia Warsaw (3)	Górnik Zabrze	Polonia Bytom	Włodzimierz Lubański (Górnik Zabrze): 22
1969–70	Legia Warsaw (4)	Ruch Chorzów	Górnik Zabrze	Andrzej Jarosik (Zagłębie Sosnowiec): 18
1970–71	Górnik Zabrze (9)	Legia Warsaw	Zagłębie Wałbrzych	Andrzej Jarosik (Zagłębie Sosnowiec): 13
1971–72	Górnik Zabrze (10)	Zagłębie Sosnowiec	Legia Warsaw	Ryszard Szymczak (Gwardia Warsaw): 16
1972–73	Stal Mielec	Ruch Chorzów	Gwardia Warszawa	Grzegorz Lato (Stal Mielec): 13
1973–74	Ruch Chorzów (11)	Górnik Zabrze	Stal Mielec	Zdzisław Kapka (Wisła Kraków): 15
1974–75	Ruch Chorzów (12)	Stal Mielec	Śląsk Wrocław	Grzegorz Lato (Stal Mielec): 19
1975–76	Stal Mielec (2)	GKS Tychy	Wisła Kraków	Kazimierz Kmiecik (Wisła Kraków): 20
1976–77	Śląsk Wrocław	Widzew Łódź	Górnik Zabrze	Włodzimierz Mazur (Zagłębie Sosnowiec): 17
1977–78	Wisła Kraków (5)	Śląsk Wrocław	Lech Poznań	Kazimierz Kmiecik (Wisła Kraków): 15
1978–79	Ruch Chorzów (13)	Widzew Łódź	Stal Mielec	Kazimierz Kmiecik (Wisła Kraków): 17
1979–80	Szombierki Bytom	Widzew Łódź	Legia Warsaw	Kazimierz Kmiecik (Wisła Kraków): 24
1980–81	Widzew Łódź	Wisła Kraków	Szombierki Bytom	Krzysztof Adamczyk (Legia Warsaw): 18
1981–82	Widzew Łódź (2)	Śląsk Wrocław	Stal Mielec	Grzegorz Kapica (Szombierki Bytom): 15
1982–83	Lech Poznań	Widzew Łódź	Ruch Chorzów	Mirosław Okoński (Lech Poznań), Mirosław Tłokiński (Widzew Łódź): 15
1983–84	Lech Poznań (2)	Widzew Łódź	Pogoń Szczecin	Włodzimierz Ciołek (Górnik Wałbrzych): 14
1984–85	Górnik Zabrze (11)	Legia Warsaw	Widzew Łódź	Leszek Iwanicki (Motor Lublin): 14
1985–86	Górnik Zabrze (12)	Legia Warsaw	Widzew Łódź	Andrzej Zgutczyński (Górnik Zabrze): 20
1986–87	Górnik Zabrze (13)	Pogoń Szczecin	GKS Katowice	Marek Leśniak (Pogoń Szczecin): 24
1987–88	Górnik Zabrze (14)	GKS Katowice	Legia Warsaw	Dariusz Dziekanowski (Legia Warsaw): 20
1988–89	Ruch Chorzów (14)	GKS Katowice	Górnik Zabrze	Krzysztof Warzycha (Ruch Chorzów): 24
1989–90	Lech Poznań (3)	Zagłębie Lubin	GKS Katowice	Andrzej Juskowiak (Lech Poznań): 18
1990–91	Zagłębie Lubin	Górnik Zabrze	Wisła Kraków	Tomasz Dziubiński (Wisła Kraków): 21
1991–92	Lech Poznań (4)	GKS Katowice	Widzew Łódź	Mirosław Waligóra (Hutnik Kraków), Jerzy Podbrożny (Lech Poznań): 20
1992–93	Lech Poznań (Note: Lech Poznań won the championship after two final day games (Wisła Kraków vs Legia Warsaw 0–6; ŁKS Łódź vs Olimpia Poznań 7–1) had been cancelled due to the never proven allegations of "unsportsmanlike conduct during the game".) (5)	Legia Warsaw	ŁKS Łódź	Jerzy Podbrożny (Lech Poznań): 25
1993–94	Legia Warsaw (5)	GKS Katowice	Górnik Zabrze	Zenon Burzawa (Tygodnik Miliarder Pniewy): 21
1994–95	Legia Warsaw (6)	Widzew Łódź	GKS Katowice	Bogusław Cygan (Stal Mielec): 16
1995–96	Widzew Łódź (3)	Legia Warsaw	Hutnik Kraków	Marek Koniarek (Widzew Łódź): 29
1996–97	Widzew Łódź (4)	Legia Daewoo Warsaw	Odra Wodzisław Śląski	Mirosław Trzeciak (ŁKS-Ptak Łódź): 18
1997–98	ŁKS-Ptak Łódź (2)	Polonia Warsaw	Wisła Kraków	Arkadiusz Bąk (Polonia Warsaw), Sylwester Czereszewski (Legia Daewoo Warsaw), Mariusz Śrutwa (Ruch Chorzów): 14
1998–99	Wisła Kraków (6)	Widzew Łódź	Legia Daewoo Warsaw	Tomasz Frankowski (Wisła Kraków): 21
1999–2000	Polonia Warsaw (2)	Wisła Kraków	Ruch Chorzów	Adam Kompała (Górnik Zabrze): 19
2000–01	Wisła Kraków (7)	Pogoń Szczecin	Legia Daewoo Warsaw	Tomasz Frankowski (Wisła Kraków): 18
2001–02	Legia Warsaw (7)	Wisła Kraków	Amica Wronki	Maciej Żurawski (Wisła Kraków): 21
2002–03	Wisła Kraków (8)	Groclin Dyskobolia Grodzisk Wielkopolski	GKS Katowice	(Serbia and Montenegro) Stanko Svitlica (Legia Warsaw): 24
2003–04	Wisła Kraków (9)	Legia Warsaw	Amica Wronki	Maciej Żurawski (Wisła Kraków): 20
2004–05	Wisła Kraków (10)	Groclin Dyskobolia Grodzisk Wielkopolski	Legia Warsaw	Tomasz Frankowski (Wisła Kraków): 25
2005–06	Legia Warsaw (8)	Wisła Kraków	Zagłębie Lubin	Grzegorz Piechna (Korona Kielce): 21
2006–07	Zagłębie Lubin (2)	GKS Bełchatów	Legia Warsaw	Piotr Reiss (Lech Poznań): 15
2007–08	Wisła Kraków (11)	Legia Warsaw	Groclin Dyskobolia Grodzisk Wielkopolski	Paweł Brożek (Wisła Kraków): 23
2008–09	Wisła Kraków (12)	Legia Warsaw	Lech Poznań	Paweł Brożek (Wisła Kraków), (Zimbabwe) Takesure Chinyama (Legia Warsaw): 19
2009–10	Lech Poznań (6)	Wisła Kraków	Ruch Chorzów	Robert Lewandowski (Lech Poznań): 18
2010–11	Wisła Kraków (13)	Śląsk Wrocław	Legia Warsaw	Tomasz Frankowski (Jagiellonia Białystok): 14
2011–12	Śląsk Wrocław (2)	Ruch Chorzów	Legia Warsaw	(Latvia) Artjoms Rudņevs (Lech Poznań): 22
2012–13	Legia Warsaw (9)	Lech Poznań	Śląsk Wrocław	(Slovakia) Róbert Demjan (Podbeskidzie Bielsko-Biała): 14
2013–14	Legia Warsaw (10)	Lech Poznań	Ruch Chorzów	Marcin Robak (Piast Gliwice, Pogoń Szczecin): 22
2014–15	Lech Poznań (7)	Legia Warsaw	Jagiellonia Białystok	Kamil Wilczek (Piast Gliwice): 20
2015–16	Legia Warsaw (11)	Piast Gliwice	Zagłębie Lubin	(Hungary) Nemanja Nikolić (Legia Warsaw): 28
2016–17	Legia Warsaw (12)	Jagiellonia Białystok	Lech Poznań	(Portugal) Marco Paixão (Lechia Gdańsk), Marcin Robak (Lech Poznań): 18
2017–18	Legia Warsaw (13)	Jagiellonia Białystok	Lech Poznań	(Spain) Carlitos (Wisła Kraków): 24
2018–19	Piast Gliwice	Legia Warsaw	Lechia Gdańsk	(Spain) Igor Angulo (Górnik Zabrze): 24
2019–20	Legia Warsaw (14)	Lech Poznań	Piast Gliwice	(Denmark) Christian Gytkjær (Lech Poznań): 24
2020–21	Legia Warsaw (15)	Raków Częstochowa	Pogoń Szczecin	(Czech Republic) Tomáš Pekhart (Legia Warsaw): 22
2021–22	Lech Poznań (8)	Raków Częstochowa	Pogoń Szczecin	(Spain) Ivi (Raków Częstochowa): 20
2022–23	Raków Częstochowa	Legia Warsaw	Lech Poznań	(Spain) Marc Gual (Jagiellonia Białystok): 16
2023–24	Jagiellonia Białystok	Śląsk Wrocław	Legia Warsaw	(Spain) Erik Expósito (Śląsk Wrocław): 19
2024–25	Lech Poznań (9)	Raków Częstochowa	Jagiellonia Białystok	(Greece) Efthymis Koulouris (Pogoń Szczecin): 28
2025–26	Lech Poznań (10)	Górnik Zabrze	Jagiellonia Białystok	(Slovakia) Tomáš Bobček (Lechia Gdańsk): 20

== Winning clubs ==
=== By number of championships ===
Titles won by club (%)
1. Legia Warsaw – 15 (15.3%)
2. Górnik Zabrze – 14 (14.3%)
3. Ruch Chorzów – 14 (14.3%)
4. Wisła Kraków – 13 (13.3%)
5. Lech Poznań – 10 (10.2%)
6. Cracovia – 5 (5.10%)
7. Pogoń Lwów – 4 (4.08%)
8. Widzew Łódź – 4 (4.08%)
9. ŁKS Łódź – 2 (2.04%)
10. Polonia Bytom – 2 (2.04%)
11. Stal Mielec – 2 (2.04%)
12. Śląsk Wrocław – 2 (2.04%)
13. Zagłębie Lubin – 2 (2.04%)
14. Polonia Warsaw – 2 (2.04%)
15. Warta Poznań – 2 (2.04%)
16. Garbarnia Kraków – 1 (1.02%)
17. Szombierki Bytom – 1 (1.02%)
18. Piast Gliwice – 1 (1.02%)
19. Raków Częstochowa – 1 (1.02%)
20. Jagiellonia Białystok – 1 (1.02%)

Titles	Team	Season(s)
15	**Legia Warsaw**	1955, 1956, 1968–69, 1969–70, 1993–94, 1994–95, 2001–02, 2005–06, 2012–13, 2013–14, 2015–16, 2016–17, 2017–18, 2019–20, 2020–21
14	**Górnik Zabrze**	1957, 1959, 1961, 1962–63, 1963–64, 1964–65, 1965–66, 1966–67, 1970–71, 1971–72, 1984–85, 1985–86, 1986–87, 1987–88
14	Ruch Chorzów	1933, 1934, 1935, 1936, 1938, 1951, 1952, 1953, 1960, 1967–68, 1973–74, 1974–75, 1978–79, 1988–89
13	**Wisła Kraków**	1927, 1928, 1949, 1950, 1977–78, 1998–99, 2000–01, 2002–03, 2003–04, 2004–05, 2007–08, 2008–09, 2010–11
10	**Lech Poznań**	1982–83, 1983–84, 1989–90, 1991–92, 1992–93, 2009–10, 2014–15, 2021–22, 2024–25, 2025–26
5	**Cracovia**	1921, 1930, 1932, 1937, 1948
4	Pogoń Lwów	1922, 1923, 1925, 1926
4	**Widzew Łódź**	1980–81, 1981–82, 1995–96, 1996–97
2	ŁKS Łódź	1958, 1997–98
2	Polonia Bytom	1954, 1962
2	Stal Mielec	1972–73, 1975–76
2	**Śląsk Wrocław**	1976–77, 2011–12
2	**Zagłębie Lubin**	1990–91, 2006–07
2	Polonia Warsaw	1946, 1999–2000
2	Warta Poznań	1929, 1947
1	Garbarnia Kraków	1931
1	Szombierki Bytom	1979–80
1	**Piast Gliwice**	2018–19
1	**Raków Częstochowa**	2022–23
1	**Jagiellonia Białystok**	2023–24

Bold indicates clubs currently playing in the top division.
Italics indicates defunct clubs.

=== By voivodeship ===
Voivodeship	Championships	Clubs
Silesian	33	Ruch Chorzów (14), Górnik Zabrze (14), Polonia Bytom (2), Piast Gliwice (1), Raków Częstochowa (1), Szombierki Bytom (1)
Lesser Poland	19	Wisła Kraków (13), Cracovia (5), Garbarnia Kraków (1)
Masovian	17	Legia Warsaw (15), Polonia Warsaw (2)
Greater Poland	12	Lech Poznań (10), Warta Poznań (2)
Łódź	6	Widzew Łódź (4), ŁKS Łódź (2)
Lower Silesian	4	Śląsk Wrocław (2), Zagłębie Lubin (2)
Lwów	4	Pogoń Lwów (4)
Subcarpathian	2	Stal Mielec (2)
Podlachian	1	Jagiellonia Białystok (1)

=== By city ===
City	Championships	Clubs
Kraków	19	Wisła Kraków (13), Cracovia (5), Garbarnia Kraków (1)
Warsaw	17	Legia Warsaw (15), Polonia Warsaw (2)
Chorzów	14	Ruch Chorzów (14)
Zabrze	14	Górnik Zabrze (14)
Poznań	12	Lech Poznań (10), Warta Poznań (2)
Łódź	6	Widzew Łódź (4), ŁKS Łódź (2)
Lwów	4	Pogoń Lwów (4)
Bytom	3	Polonia Bytom (2), Szombierki Bytom (1)
Lubin	2	Zagłębie Lubin (2)
Mielec	2	Stal Mielec (2)
Wrocław	2	Śląsk Wrocław (2)
Białystok	1	Jagiellonia Białystok (1)
Częstochowa	1	Raków Częstochowa (1)
Gliwice	1	Piast Gliwice (1)

== Honoured teams ==
After 10 Polish Championship titles a representative Golden Star is placed above the team's badge to indicate 10 Polish Championship titles.

The current (as of May 2026) officially sanctioned Championship stars are:

- Golden Star 10 or more Polish Championship titles:
  - Ruch Chorzów
  - Górnik Zabrze
  - Wisła Kraków
  - Legia Warsaw
  - Lech Poznań
- Silver Star 5–9 Polish Championship titles:
  - Cracovia
- White Star 1-4 Polish Championship titles
  - Pogoń Lwów
  - Warta Poznań
  - Garbarnia Kraków
  - Polonia Warsaw
  - Polonia Bytom
  - ŁKS Łódź
  - Stal Mielec
  - Śląsk Wrocław
  - Szombierki Bytom
  - Widzew Łódź
  - Zagłębie Lubin
  - Piast Gliwice
  - Raków Częstochowa
  - Jagiellonia Białystok

== Statistics ==
Location of Polish football champions
Location of Polish football champions in the Katowice urban area	Location of Polish football champions in Kraków

At the end of 2025–26 Ekstraklasa.

Rank	Team	Podium Appearances		
Rank	Team	1st	2nd	3rd
1.	**Legia Warsaw**	15	14	14
2.	Ruch Chorzów	14	6	9
3.	**Górnik Zabrze**	14	5	7
4.	**Wisła Kraków**	13	13	9
5.	**Lech Poznań**	10	3	7
6.	**Cracovia**	5	2	2
7.	**Widzew Łódź**	4	7	3
8.	Pogoń Lwów	4	3	—
9.	Warta Poznań	2	5	7
10.	Polonia Bytom	2	4	2
10.	**Śląsk Wrocław**	2	4	2
12.	Polonia Warsaw	2	3	2
13.	ŁKS Łódź	2	1	3
13.	Stal Mielec	2	1	3
15.	**Zagłębie Lubin**	2	1	2
16.	**Raków Częstochowa**	1	3	—
17.	**Jagiellonia Białystok**	1	2	3
18.	**Piast Gliwice**	1	1	1
18.	Szombierki Bytom	1	1	1
20.	Garbarnia Kraków	1	1	—
21.	**GKS Katowice**	—	4	4
22.	Zagłębie Sosnowiec	—	4	3
23.	**Pogoń Szczecin**	—	2	3
24.	Dyskobolia Grodzisk Wielkopolski	—	2	1
25.	AKS Chorzów	—	1	3
26.	Gwardia Warsaw	—	1	2
26.	1. FC Katowice	—	1	—
26.	GKS Bełchatów	—	1	—
26.	GKS Tychy	—	1	—
26.	Wawel Kraków	—	1	—
31.	Amica Wronki	—	—	2
31.	Lechia Gdańsk	—	—	2
33.	Hutnik Kraków	—	—	1
33.	Odra Opole	—	—	1
33.	Odra Wodzisław Śląski	—	—	1
33.	Zagłębie Wałbrzych	—	—	1

Bold indicates clubs currently playing in the top division.
Italics indicates defunct clubs.

Source: 90minut

== See also ==
- Football in Poland
- Ekstraklasa
- Polish Cup
- Polish Super Cup
- Ekstraklasa Cup
- Sports in Poland
