= 1953 Ekstraklasa =

27th season of top-tier football league in Poland

Liga
- Season: 1953
- Champions: Ruch Chorzów (8th title)
- Relegated: Odra Opole; Lechia Gdańsk
- Top goalscorer: Gerard Cieślik (24 goals)

Statistics of Ekstraklasa for the 1953 season.

== Overview ==
12 teams competed in the 1953 season. Ruch Chorzów won the championship.

== League table ==
Pos	Team	Pld	W	D	L	GF	GA	GD	Pts
1	Ruch Chorzów (C)	22	17	4	1	51	14	+37	38
2	Wawel Kraków	22	11	6	5	39	25	+14	28
3	Wisła Kraków	22	12	3	7	35	29	+6	27
4	Gwardia Warsaw	22	11	4	7	27	27	0	26
5	Legia Warsaw	22	8	7	7	37	31	+6	23
6	Polonia Bytom	22	10	3	9	33	29	+4	23
7	Lech Poznań	22	4	10	8	22	29	−7	18
8	Górnik Radlin	22	6	6	10	27	38	−11	18
9	AKS Chorzów	22	7	4	11	31	46	−15	18
10	KS Cracovia	22	7	3	12	23	30	−7	17
11	Odra Opole (R)	22	4	8	10	25	38	−13	16
12	Lechia Gdańsk (R)	22	2	8	12	21	35	−14	12

Source: 90minut.pl (in Polish)
(C) Champions; (R) Relegated

== Results ==
Home \ Away	AKS	CRA	GRA	GWA	LGD	LPO	LEG	BYT	OOP	RUC	WAW	WIS
AKS Chorzów		2–0	2–0	2–0	1–1	2–0	2–2	2–3	1–1	2–3	2–4	0–3
Cracovia	4–0		1–0	1–2	2–0	2–1	0–3	3–1	2–1	1–2	0–1	4–2
Górnik Radlin	3–3	2–0		1–1	2–1	2–2	2–0	0–2	1–0	1–3	2–0	1–2
Gwardia Warsaw	0–1	2–0	2–3		2–1	3–1	1–1	0–0	3–0	0–0	2–1	1–0
Lechia Gdańsk	3–0	0–0	0–0	1–2		2–3	0–1	0–2	0–1	0–1	2–2	1–0
Lech Poznań	0–1	1–0	1–1	1–2	1–1		1–1	1–0	0–0	1–3	0–0	0–0
Legia Warsaw	3–1	3–2	4–2	4–0	3–3	1–1		3–1	0–3	2–0	0–0	0–0
Polonia Bytom	2–1	2–0	4–0	0–1	1–1	2–2	1–0		1–2	0–2	0–1	4–0
Odra Opole	2–4	0–0	1–1	1–2	1–1	2–4	3–2	3–4		1–1	0–0	1–1
Ruch Chorzów	7–0	0–0	3–1	5–0	3–0	2–0	3–2	1–0	2–0		1–0	4–0
Wawel Kraków	2–0	2–1	4–1	1–0	5–1	1–1	3–1	1–2	5–1	3–3		1–4
Wisła Kraków	3–2	3–0	2–1	2–1	2–1	1–0	2–1	4–1	3–1	0–2	1–2	

Source: 90minut.pl (in Polish)
Legend: Blue = home team win; Yellow = draw; Red = away team win.

== Top goalscorers ==
Rank	Player	Club	Goals
1	(Poland) Gerard Cieślik	Ruch Chorzów	24
2	(Poland) Henryk Szymborski	Legia Warsaw	17
3	(Poland) Eugeniusz Piechaczek	Wawel Kraków	15
4	(Poland) Teodor Anioła	Lech Poznań	13
4	(Poland) Jan Wiśniewski	Polonia Bytom	13
6	(Poland) Stanisław Hachorek	Gwardia Warszawa	10
6	(Poland) Józef Kohut	Wisła Kraków	10
6	(Poland) Ginter Powała	AKS Chorzów	10
6	(Poland) Ewald Wiśniowski	Górnik Radlin	10
10	(Poland) Julian Radoń	Cracovia	9

== Attendances ==
#	Club	Average
1	Ruch Chorzów	16,364
2	Wisła Kraków	14,727
3	Lechia Gdańsk	13,727
4	Cracovia	12,818
5	Polonia Bytom	10,455
6	Wawel Kraków	9,909
7	Lech Poznań	9,909
8	Odra Opole	9,909
9	Chorzów	9,545
10	Legia Warszawa	9,091
11	Gwardia Warszawa	7,727
12	Górnik Radlin	6,227
