= Horst Mahseli =

Polish footballer

Personal information
- Full name: Horst Lothar Mahseli
- Date of birth: 20 June 1934
- Place of birth: Bytom, Germany (now Poland)
- Date of death: 3 December 1999 (aged 65)
- Place of death: Singen, Germany
- Height: 1.77 m (5 ft 10 in)
- Positions: Right-back; striker

Senior career*
Years	Team	Apps	(Gls)
1948–1954	Polonia Bytom	22	(0)
1955–1969	Legia Warsaw	295	(2)
1972–1973	Okęcie Warsaw		

International career
1955–1958	Poland	9	(0)

Managerial career
- 1972–1973: Okęcie Warsaw (player-manager)
- 1974: Star Starachowice
- * Club domestic league appearances and goals

Horst Lothar Mahseli (20 January 1934 – 3 December 1999) was a Polish footballer who is best remembered for his 1950s performances in both Legia Warsaw and the Poland national team.

== Honours ==
Polonia Bytom

- Ekstraklasa: 1954

Legia Warsaw

- Ekstraklasa: 1955, 1956, 1968–69
- Polish Cup: 1954–55, 1955–56, 1963–64, 1965–66
