= 1955 Ekstraklasa =

29th season of top-tier football league in Poland

Liga
- Season: 1955
- Champions: Legia Warsaw (1st title)
- Relegated: Polonia Bytom; Górnik Radlin
- Top goalscorer: Stanisław Hachorek (16 goals)

Statistics of Ekstraklasa for the 1955 season.

== Overview ==
It was contested by 12 teams, and Legia Warsaw won the championship.

== League table ==
Pos	Team	Pld	W	D	L	GF	GA	GD	Pts	Qualification or relegation
1	Legia Warsaw (C)	22	12	4	6	48	21	+27	28	
2	Zagłębie Sosnowiec	22	10	7	5	30	16	+14	27	
3	Ruch Chorzów	22	7	11	4	34	25	+9	25	
4	Gwardia Warsaw	22	11	3	8	38	30	+8	25	Qualification for the European Cup
5	Lechia Gdańsk	22	8	7	7	19	15	+4	23	
6	Garbarnia Kraków	22	9	5	8	25	21	+4	23	
7	Wisła Kraków	22	10	2	10	26	29	−3	22	
8	ŁKS Łódź	22	8	5	9	27	37	−10	21	
9	Lech Poznań	22	7	5	10	24	35	−11	19	
10	Polonia Bydgoszcz	22	6	6	10	18	26	−8	18	
11	Polonia Bytom (R)	22	5	7	10	23	36	−13	17	Relegated to II liga
12	Górnik Radlin (R)	22	5	6	11	20	41	−21	16	Relegated to II liga

Source: 90minut.pl (in Polish)
(C) Champions; (R) Relegated

== Results ==
Home \ Away	GAR	GRA	GWA	LPO	LGD	LEG	ŁKS	BYG	BYT	RUC	WIS	ZSO
Garbarnia Kraków		1–0	2–0	2–0	0–0	0–1	1–1	0–0	1–0	2–0	0–1	1–2
Górnik Radlin	1–0		1–3	6–0	0–1	1–1	1–0	2–0	0–0	2–2	1–2	2–1
Gwardia Warsaw	2–2	3–1		1–2	1–0	1–5	1–0	4–1	7–1	0–3	3–0	0–2
Lech Poznań	2–0	2–0	1–2		1–1	2–1	1–1	2–2	2–0	1–5	3–1	0–0
Lechia Gdańsk	0–1	0–0	1–1	3–0		0–1	2–0	1–0	0–1	2–2	2–1	0–0
Legia Warsaw	5–0	9–1	2–3	0–0	0–1		2–3	2–1	0–0	3–0	2–0	1–0
ŁKS Łódź	0–4	0–0	3–2	2–0	3–0	1–5		3–0	0–3 (Note: The match between ŁKS Łódź and Polonia Bytom was stopped after 58 minutes due to riots and the score was 0–3.)	0–0	1–0	2–1
Polonia Bydgoszcz	0–3	0–0	0–1	1–0	1–0	2–0	5–2		2–0	0–0	0–1	1–0
Polonia Bytom	1–1	6–0	1–3	3–1	1–0	0–3	1–2	1–1		2–2	0–2	1–1
Ruch Chorzów	3–0	5–1	0–0	0–3	0–0	4–1	1–0	0–0	1–1		3–0	0–0
Wisła Kraków	0–3	1–0	1–0	3–1	1–3	0–3	1–1	2–0	3–0	6–2		0–0
Zagłębie Sosnowiec	2–1	4–0	1–0	1–0	0–2	1–1	6–2	2–1	4–0	1–1	1–0	

Source: 90minut.pl (in Polish)
Legend: Blue = home team win; Yellow = draw; Red = away team win.

== Top goalscorers ==
Rank	Player	Club	Goals
1	(Poland) Stanisław Hachorek	Gwardia Warszawa	16
2	(Poland) Gerard Cieślik	Ruch Chorzów	15
3	(Poland) Lucjan Brychczy	Legia Warsaw	13
4	(Poland) Ernest Pol	Legia Warsaw	12
5	(Poland) Krzysztof Baszkiewicz	Gwardia Warszawa	11
6	(Poland) Teodor Anioła	Lech Poznań	10
6	(Poland) Wiesław Gamaj	Wisła Kraków	10
6	(Poland) Wilhelm Glajcar	Garbarnia Kraków	10
6	(Poland) Paweł Krężel	Stal Sosnowiec	10
6	(Poland) Henryk Szymborski	ŁKS Łódź	10
6	(Poland) Jan Wiśniewski	Ruch Chorzów	10

== Attendances ==
#	Club	Average
1	ŁKS	23,364
2	Lechia Gdańsk	17,182
3	Zagłębie Sosnowiec	16,091
4	Ruch Chorzów	15,455
5	Legia Warszawa	15,182
6	Garbania Kraków	14,273
7	Polonia Bytom	13,273
8	Wisła Kraków	12,545
9	Gwardia Warszawa	12,182
10	Lech Poznań	9,364
11	Polonia Bydgoszcz	6,727
12	Górnik Radlin	6,545
