= 1954 Ekstraklasa =

28th season of top-tier football league in Poland

Liga
- Season: 1954
- Champions: Polonia Bytom (1st title)
- Relegated: AKS Chorzów; KS Cracovia; Wawel Kraków
- Top goalscorer: Ernst Pohl; Henryk Kempny (13 goals)

Statistics of Ekstraklasa for the 1954 season.

== Overview ==
It was contested by 12 teams, and Polonia Bytom won the championship.

== League table ==
Pos	Team	Pld	W	D	L	GF	GA	GD	Pts	Qualification or relegation
1	Polonia Bytom (C)	20	9	6	5	36	22	+14	24	
2	ŁKS Łódź	20	9	6	5	30	20	+10	24	
3	Ruch Chorzów	20	10	4	6	24	18	+6	24	
4	Gwardia Warsaw	20	9	4	7	24	26	−2	22	
5	Lech Poznań	20	9	3	8	14	18	−4	21	
6	Górnik Radlin	20	8	4	8	23	24	−1	20	
7	Legia Warsaw	20	7	5	8	27	29	−2	19	
8	Wisła Kraków	20	7	4	9	19	20	−1	18	
9	Polonia Bydgoszcz	20	6	4	10	18	22	−4	16	
10	AKS Chorzów (R)	20	5	6	9	28	37	−9	16	Relegated to II liga
11	KS Cracovia (R)	20	5	6	9	21	28	−7	16	Relegated to II liga
12	Wawel Kraków (R)	0	-	-	-	-	-	—	0	Relegated to II liga

Source: 90minut.pl (in Polish)
(C) Champions; (R) Relegated

== Results ==
Home \ Away	AKS	CRA	ŁKS	GRA	GWA	LPO	LEG	BYG	BYT	RUC	WIS
AKS Chorzów		6–1	2–2	0–1	1–1	1–3	1–2	4–0	1–2	1–1	1–1
Cracovia	4–1		1–1	2–0	2–3	5–0	0–2	0–1	1–1	2–1	1–1
ŁKS Łódź	2–1	3–0		2–0	1–0	1–1	4–1	2–0	2–2	5–1	1–0
Górnik Radlin	2–2	3–0	1–1		1–2	1–0	4–1	1–1	2–1	0–2	3–1
Gwardia Warsaw	0–1	2–1	1–0	1–1		0–1	1–0	1–3	2–1	3–2	1–0
Lech Poznań	0–0	0–1	1–0	2–0	2–1		1–0	1–0	0–1	1–0	0–1
Legia Warsaw	6–2	0–0	1–1	4–1	2–2	0–0		2–0	0–4	0–2	1–0
Polonia Bydgoszcz	0–1	0–0	0–2	1–0	0–1	2–0	1–2		3–0	0–1	0–1
Polonia Bytom	6–0	1–0	3–0	0–1	3–1	0–1	2–2	2–2		1–1	2–0
Ruch Chorzów	2–0	2–0	2–0	1–0	1–1	1–0	1–0	1–1	1–2		1–0
Wisła Kraków	1–2	0–0	2–0	0–1	3–0	3–0	2–1	0–3	2–2	1–0	

Source: 90minut.pl (in Polish)
Legend: Blue = home team win; Yellow = draw; Red = away team win.

== Top goalscorers ==
Rank	Player	Club	Goals
1	(Poland) Ernest Pol	Legia Warsaw	13
2	(Poland) Henryk Kempny	Polonia Bytom	12
3	(Poland) Teodor Anioła	Lech Poznań	11
4	(Poland) Gerard Cieślik	Ruch Chorzów	9
4	(Poland) Wacław Sąsiadek	Polonia Bytom	9
4	(Poland) Władysław Soporek	ŁKS Łódź	9
7	(Poland) Ewald Wiśniowski	Górnik Radlin	8
8	(Poland) Krzysztof Baszkiewicz	Gwardia Warszawa	7
8	(Poland) Stanisław Hachorek	Gwardia Warszawa	7
8	(Poland) Edward Jankowski	Górnik Radlin	7
8	(Poland) Kazimierz Trampisz	Polonia Bytom	7

== Attendances ==
#	Club	Average
1	ŁKS	27,000
2	Ruch Chorzów	20,100
3	Cracovia	17,100
4	Wisła Kraków	15,600
5	Polonia Bytom	14,300
6	Chorzów	11,100
7	Lech Poznań	8,900
8	Legia Warszawa	8,700
9	Polonia Bydgoszcz	6,600
10	Gwardia Warszawa	6,400
11	Górnik Radlin	6,000
