= 1948 Ekstraklasa =

22nd season of top-tier football league in Poland

Liga
- Season: 1948
- Champions: KS Cracovia (5th title)
- Relegated: Tarnovia Tarnów; Garbarnia Kraków; Rymer Rybnik; Widzew Łódź
- Top goalscorer: Józef Kohut (31 goals)
- Highest attendance: 30,000

Statistics of Ekstraklasa for the 1948 season.

== Overview ==
It was contested by 14 teams, and Cracovia won the championship.

== League table ==
Pos	Team	Pld	W	D	L	GF	GA	GD	Pts	Qualification or relegation
1	Wisła Kraków	26	17	4	5	86	34	+52	38	Qualification to final
2	KS Cracovia (C)	26	17	4	5	61	26	+35	38	Qualification to final
3	Ruch Chorzów	26	12	6	8	71	40	+31	30	
4	Legia Warsaw	26	14	2	10	55	46	+9	30	
5	AKS Chorzów	26	13	3	10	50	49	+1	29	
6	Lech Poznań	26	9	8	9	48	49	−1	26	
7	Polonia Warsaw	26	11	4	11	45	49	−4	26	
8	ŁKS Łódź	26	10	4	12	60	64	−4	24	
9	Warta Poznań	26	9	6	11	51	56	−5	24	
10	Polonia Bytom	26	9	5	12	48	55	−7	23	
11	Tarnovia Tarnów (R)	26	10	2	14	42	48	−6	22	Relegated to II liga
12	Garbarnia Kraków (R)	26	9	4	13	38	52	−14	22	Relegated to II liga
13	Rymer Rybnik (R)	26	8	3	15	45	64	−19	19	Relegated to II liga
14	Widzew Łódź (R)	26	5	3	18	31	99	−68	13	Relegated to II liga

Source: 90minut.pl (in Polish)
(C) Champions; (R) Relegated

== Results ==
Home \ Away	AKS	CRA	GAR	LPO	LEG	ŁKS	BYT	PWA	RUC	RYB	TAR	WAR	WID	WIS
AKS Chorzów		1–0	6–0	3–2	1–3	2–5	3–2	0–1	0–2	2–0	4–0	2–4	1–0	2–1
Cracovia	5–1		2–0	3–1	2–0	6–1	2–1	3–1	0–4	4–0	3–0	2–2	7–0	1–1
Garbarnia Kraków	1–1	3–2		1–1	1–0	0–0	4–1	2–1	2–6	1–0	3–1	3–4	2–1	1–3
Lech Poznań	1–2	1–0	1–1		5–4	1–3	4–2	2–1	3–2	3–3	2–0	2–0	1–1	1–1
Legia Warsaw	4–1	0–0	2–0	3–1		1–3	3–1	0–1	4–2	1–0	0–2	2–1	6–0	4–1
ŁKS Łódź	1–4	1–0	1–2	3–2	3–0		3–3	2–4	3–7	6–1	2–1	3–3	6–1	0–3
Polonia Bytom	3–3	2–3	4–1	1–2	1–2	4–3		1–1	1–1	3–1	1–0	3–0	2–1	2–4
Polonia Warsaw	4–1	2–5	2–1	2–2	0–1	3–1	3–1		0–3	6–2	3–0	0–0	6–1	0–5
Ruch Chorzów	1–1	1–2	1–0	2–0	3–3	3–0	1–2	1–2		5–1	4–2	3–1	13–1	1–1
Rymer Rybnik	0–3	1–2	4–3	1–2	3–2	2–0	2–2	2–1	1–1		3–0	2–3	4–1	1–2
Tarnovia Tarnów	4–0	1–1	2–0	2–2	1–3	2–1	0–1	3–0	3–0	4–0		4–1	5–1	2–1
Warta Poznań	1–3	0–2	0–5	2–2	4–1	2–2	1–3	3–0	1–1	5–1	3–0		3–2	2–3
Widzew Łódź	0–3	1–2	2–1	4–3	1–6	2–6	2–1	1–1	3–2	0–3	3–2	0–3		2–2
Wisła Kraków	4–0	0–2	4–0	2–1	8–0	5–1	5–0	6–0	3–1	2–7	6–1	5–2	8–0	

Source: 90minut.pl (in Polish)
Legend: Blue = home team win; Yellow = draw; Red = away team win.

== Final ==
- Cracovia 3-1 Wisła Kraków

== Top goalscorers ==
Rank	Player	Club	Goals
1	(Poland) Józef Kohut	Wisła Kraków	31
2	(Poland) Mieczysław Gracz	Wisła Kraków	28
3	(Poland) Stanisław Różankowski	Cracovia	22
4	(Poland) Henryk Spodzieja	AKS Chorzów	20
5	(Poland) Gerard Cieślik	Ruch Chorzów	18
6	(Poland) Henryk Alszer	Ruch Chorzów	17
6	(Poland) Longin Janeczek	ŁKS Łódź	17
6	(Poland) Marian Łącz	ŁKS Łódź	17
9	(Poland) Henryk Jaźnicki	Polonia Warsaw	15
10	(Poland) Stanisław Baran	ŁKS Łódź	14
