= Kazimierz Trampisz =

Polish footballer

Personal information
- Full name: Kazimierz Jan Trampisz
- Date of birth: 10 January 1929
- Place of birth: Stanisławów, Poland
- Date of death: 12 August 2014 (aged 85)
- Place of death: Bytom, Poland
- Height: 1.63 m (5 ft 4 in)
- Position: Striker

Senior career*
Years	Team	Apps	(Gls)
1944–1945	Łokomotyw Stanisławów		
1945–1946	Polonia Bytom		
1946–1947	Hejnał Kęty		
1947–1962	Polonia Bytom		
1963–1964	Stal Rzeszów		

International career
1950–1958	Poland	10	(3)

Managerial career
- 1964–1969: Stal Rzeszów
- 1970–1971: Polonia Bytom
- 1971: GKS Katowice
- Hutnik Kraków
- Zagłębie Sosnowiec
- 1977: GKS Jastrzębie
- 1980–1982: GKS Jastrzębie
- 1990–1991: Polonia Bytom
- Polonez Warsaw
- AKS Chorzów
- Przebój Wolbrom
- * Club domestic league appearances and goals

Kazimierz Jan Trampisz (10 January 1929 – 12 August 2014) was a Polish footballer who played as a striker.

He spent most of his playing career at Polonia Bytom during golden era of the club's golden era. Trampisz played 10 times for Poland, scoring three goals. He participated in the 1952 Summer Olympics, scoring one goal against France. He later coached Stal Rzeszów and GKS Jastrzębie

== Honours ==
Polonia Bytom

- Ekstraklasa: 1954, 1962
