= Eugeniusz Kubicki =

Polish footballer (1925–1987)

Personal information
- Full name: Eugeniusz Kubicki
- Birth name: Eryk Kubicki
- Date of birth: 18 August 1925
- Place of birth: Hajduki Wielkie, Chorzów, Poland
- Date of death: 4 November 1987 (aged 62)
- Place of death: Poland
- Height: 1.67 m (5 ft 6 in)
- Position: Winger

Youth career
- 1939: Ruch Chorzów
- 1939–1942: Bismarckhütter SV

Senior career*
Years	Team	Apps	(Gls)
1946	York City	5	(0)
1947–1957	Ruch/Chemik/Unia Chorzów		

International career
1948	Poland	1	(0)
- * Club domestic league appearances and goals

Eugeniusz Kubicki (born Eryk Kubicki; 18 August 1925 – 4 November 1987) was a Polish footballer who played as a winger.

== Career ==
Kubicki joined York City from the Polish Army in October 1946.

== Death ==
Kubicki died in Poland on 4 November 1987, at the age of 62.

== Honours ==
Ruch Chorzów

- Ekstraklasa: 1951, 1952, 1953
- Polish Cup: 1950–51
