= Helmut Cichoń =

Polish footballer (born 1929)

Personal information
- Date of birth: 11 March 1929
- Place of birth: Bobrek, Bytom, Poland
- Height: 1.71 m (5 ft 7 in)
- Position: Defender

Senior career*
Years	Team	Apps	(Gls)
1947–1950	Stal Bobrek		
1950–1957	Polonia Bytom		

International career
1954–1955	Poland	4	(0)
- * Club domestic league appearances and goals

Helmut Cichoń (born 11 March 1929, date of death unknown) was a Polish footballer who played as a defender.

He made four appearances for the Poland national team from 1954 to 1955. Cichoń is deceased.

== Honours ==
Polonia Bytom

- Ekstraklasa: 1954
