= Edmund Kowal =

Polish footballer (1931–1960)

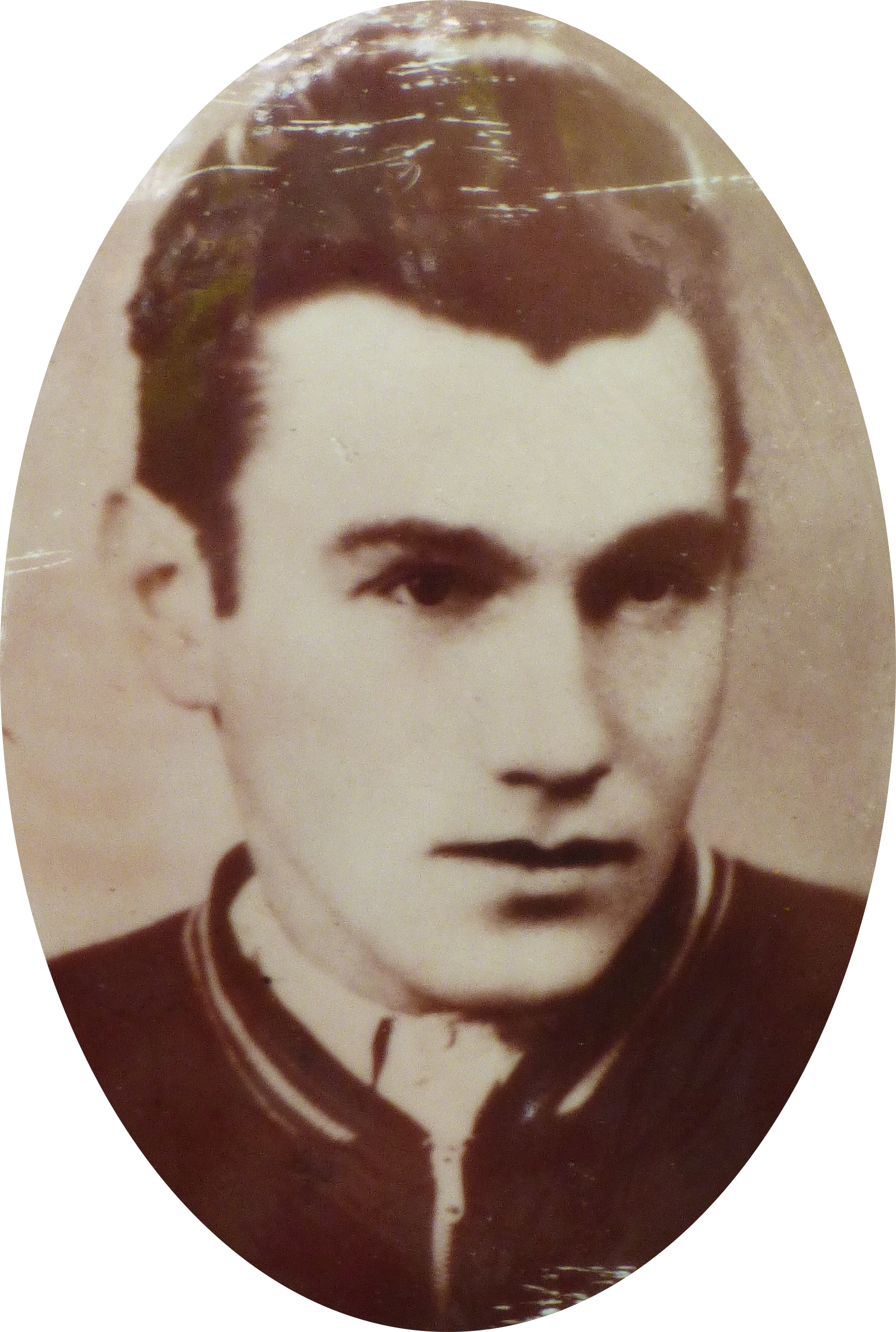

Personal information
- Birth name: Erwin Schmidt
- Date of birth: 16 February 1931
- Place of birth: Bobrek, Upper Silesia, Germany
- Date of death: 22 April 1960 (aged 29)
- Place of death: Poznań, Poland
- Height: 1.72 m (5 ft 8 in)
- Position: Forward

Senior career*
Years	Team	Apps	(Gls)
1946–1949	Odra/Sparta Bobrek		
1949–1952	Stal Bobrek		
1952–1953	Wawel Kraków		
1953–1956	Legia Warsaw		
1957–1960	Górnik Zabrze		

International career
1953–1958	Poland	8	(1)
- * Club domestic league appearances and goals

Edmund Kowal (born Erwin Schmidt; 16 February 1931 – 22 April 1960) was a Polish footballer who played as a forward.

He played in eight matches for Poland from 1953 to 1958.

== Honours ==
Legia Warsaw

- Ekstraklasa: 1955, 1956
- Polish Cup: 1954–55, 1955–56

Górnik Zabrze

- Ekstraklasa: 1957, 1959
