= Henryk Janduda =

Polish footballer (1924–2008)

Personal information
- Full name: Henryk Paweł Janduda
- Date of birth: 11 February 1924
- Place of birth: Knurów, Poland
- Date of death: 28 November 2008 (aged 84)
- Place of death: Ahlen, Germany
- Height: 1.75 m (5 ft 9 in)
- Position: Defender

Senior career*
Years	Team	Apps	(Gls)
1936–1943	Kresy Chorzów		
1947–1954	AKS Chorzów	129	(7)
1955–1956	KS Chełmek		
1957–1958	Wyzwolenie Chorzów		

International career
1948–1950	Poland	9	(0)

Managerial career
- 1954: Soła Oświęcim
- 1955–1956: KS Chełmek (player-manager)
- 1957–1958: Wyzwolenie Chorzów (player-manager)
- Kleofas Załęże
- Siemianowiczanka Siemianowice Śląskie
- CKS Czeladź
- Górnik Kostuchna
- Jedność Michałkowice
- Podlesianka Katowice
- * Club domestic league appearances and goals

Henryk Janduda (11 February 1924 – 28 November 2008) was a Polish footballer and manager.

He made nine appearances matches for the Poland national team from 1948 to 1950. As a player, he amassed multiple seasons in the top division with AKS Chorzów. He later became a player-manager and then manager.

== Bibliography ==
- Andrzej Gowarzewski: Biało-czerwoni. Dzieje reprezentacji Polski 1947–1970. GiA Katowice, 1995. ISBN 83-902751-4-7.
- Andrzej Gowarzewski: Mistrzostwa Polski. Ludzie (1945-1962). 100 lat prawdziwej historii. GiA Katowice, 2017. ISBN 978-83-88232-63-3.
- Andrzej Gowarzewski: Mistrzostwa Polski. Mecze – Kluby – Sezony (1945-1955). 100 lat prawdziwej historii. GiA Katowice, 2018. ISBN 978-83-88232-64-0.
