= Tadeusz Miksa =

Polish footballer (1926–1989)

Personal information
- Full name: Tadeusz Józef Miksa
- Date of birth: 11 April 1926
- Place of birth: Kraków, Poland
- Date of death: 5 December 1989 (aged 63)
- Place of death: Kraków, Poland
- Height: 1.80 m (5 ft 11 in)
- Position: Defender

Youth career
- 1939: Cracovia
- 1941–1945: Groble Kraków

Senior career*
Years	Team	Apps	(Gls)
1945–1949	Groble Kraków		
1950–1951	Cracovia	2	(0)
1952–1953	Lechia Gdańsk	30	(1)
1954–1955	Wisła Kraków	8	(0)
1957–1960	Hutnik Kraków		
1960–1961	Sparta Kazimierz Wielki		
1961–1962	Naprzód Jędrzejów		

Managerial career
- 1960–1961: Sparta Kazimierz Wielki (player-manager)
- 1961–1962: Naprzód Jędrzejów (player-manager)
- 1970–1971: Cracovia
- Hutnik Kraków
- Lotnik Wrocław
- * Club domestic league appearances and goals

Tadeusz Józef Miksa (11 April 1926 – 5 December 1989) was a Polish footballer who played as a defender. Miksa is most well known for his time playing with Cracovia, Lechia Gdańsk, and Wisła Kraków. In total, Miksa made 40 appearances and scored 1 goal in Poland's highest division.

== Biography ==
Miksa was born in Kraków and started playing football with his local team Cracovia before the outbreak of World War Two. His playing career was initially halted during the early years of the war, but Miksa started training with Groble Kraków during the Nazi occupation of Poland. After the war, Miksa was able to start his playing career, moving into the Groble first team. In 1950 he returned to Cracovia who were playing in the I liga, Poland's highest division. In his first season he failed to make any league appearances for Cracovia. This changed in his second season however when Miksa made 2 appearances in the league. Miksa moved to the north of Poland in 1952 when he joined Lechia Gdańsk. He made his Lechia debut in the Young Leaders Rally Cup playing against Polonia Bytom in their 1–0 win. Miksa made 22 appearances for Lechia in his first season, including 9 in the I liga. In his second season with the club he went on to make 21 league appearances, including his first, and only goal in the top division. For the 1954 season he joined Wisła Kraków, making his debut against Górnik Radlin. During the 1953 season Miksa made 9 appearances in total for Wisła, including 8 in the league. Miksa failed to make any appearances during the 1954 season, and found himself without a club for the 1955 season. He returned to playing in 1957 when he joined Hutnik Kraków, spending the next four seasons with the club. In 1960 his role changed, becoming a player-manager when he joined Sparta Kazimierz Wielki. He held this role at the club for just over a season before having the same role with Naprzód Jędrzejów until he retired from playing in 1962. Miksa's first role in club management was between 1970 and 1971 with Cracovia, jointly sharing the role with Romuald Meus. Later clubs Miska managed were Hutnik Kraków and Lotnik Wrocław.
