= Tadeusz Glimas =

Polish footballer (1925–1969)

Personal information
- Date of birth: 17 February 1925
- Place of birth: Kraków, Poland
- Date of death: 13 May 1969 (aged 44)
- Place of death: Kraków, Poland
- Height: 1.74 m (5 ft 9 in)
- Position: Defender

Senior career*
Years	Team	Apps	(Gls)
1945–1957	Cracovia		
- Proszowianka Proszowice

International career
1950–1952	Poland	4	(0)

Managerial career
- Proszowianka Proszowice (player-manager)
- * Club domestic league appearances and goals

Tadeusz Glimas (17 February 1925 – 13 May 1969) was a Polish footballer who played as a defender.

He made four appearances for the Poland national team from 1950 to 1952. He was also part of Poland's squad for the football tournament at the 1952 Summer Olympics, but he did not play in any matches.

== Honours ==
Cracovia

- Ekstraklasa: 1948
