= Henryk Alszer =

Polish footballer

Personal information
- Date of birth: 7 May 1918
- Place of birth: Chorzów, Poland
- Date of death: 31 December 1959 (aged 41)
- Place of death: Ruda Śląska, Poland
- Height: 1.76 m (5 ft 9 in)
- Position: Forward

Senior career*
Years	Team	Apps	(Gls)
- RKS Hajduki
- Hajduczanka Hajduki
- Azoty Chorzów
- 06 Kleofas Katowice
1939–1941	Bergknappen Königshütte		
1945	Lens		
1946–1947	Fraserburgh		
1946–1947	Forres Mechanics		
1947–1957	Ruch Chorzów	176	(51)
1958	Górnik Katowice		
1959	Pogoń Nowy Bytom		

International career
1948–1955	Poland	13	(2)

Managerial career
- 1958: Górnik Katowice (player-manager)
- 1959: Pogoń Nowy Bytom (player-manager)
- * Club domestic league appearances and goals

Henryk Alszer (7 May 1918 – 31 December 1959) was a Polish footballer. He was part of the Poland national team who were at the 1952 Summer Olympics.

Before the war he participated in several sports for the sports and athletic club of RKS Hajduki, but due to the war he, like several others, found himself unable to play football. After the war he went to France to play for RC Lens and to Scotland to play for Fraserburgh and Forres Mechanics. He returned home in 1947 to play for Ruch Chorzów and aided them to a championship titles in 1951, 1952 and 1953. When he departed from the team in 1958 he had scored 51 goals in 176 matches, and though he moved to Górnik Katowice, he took on more of a coaching role than a playing one.

Alszer played in fourteen international matches, the first of which was against Yugoslavia in 1948.

He died on New Year's Eve in 1959 after being hit by a car.

== Honours ==
Ruch Chorzów

- Ekstraklasa: 1951, 1952, 1953
- Polish Cup: 1950–51
