= Witold Majewski =

Polish footballer

Personal information
- Date of birth: 4 September 1930
- Place of birth: Zagórze, Russian Empire
- Date of death: 4 October 2005 (aged 75)
- Place of death: Sosnowiec, Poland
- Height: 1.75 m (5 ft 9 in)
- Position: Forward

Senior career*
Years	Team	Apps	(Gls)
1945–1951	Stal Sosnowiec		
1952	Stal Wrocław		
1953–1966	Zagłębie Sosnowiec		
1967–1969	A.A.C. Eagles		

International career
1958–1962	Poland	7	(0)

Managerial career
- 1967: Zagłębie Sosnowiec
- * Club domestic league appearances and goals

Witold Majewski (4 September 1930 – 4 October 2005) was a Polish footballer. He played in seven matches for the Poland national football team from 1958 to 1962.

== Honours ==
Zagłębie Sosnowiec

- II liga: 1954, 1959 (North)
- Polish Cup: 1961–62, 1962–63
