= Henryk Baran (footballer) =

Polish footballer (1934–1977)

Personal information
- Full name: Henryk Baran
- Date of birth: 29 July 1934
- Place of birth: Dąbrowa Górnicza, Poland
- Date of death: 28 June 1977 (aged 42)
- Place of death: Dąbrowa Górnicza, Poland
- Height: 1.75 m (5 ft 9 in)
- Position: Forward

Youth career
- Unia Ząbkowice

Senior career*
Years	Team	Apps	(Gls)
1949–1952	Unia Ząbkowice		
1952–1956	Lechia Gdańsk	16	(4)
1957–1964	Unia Ząbkowice		

Managerial career
- 1957–1964: Unia Ząbkowice
- * Club domestic league appearances and goals

Henryk Baran (29 July 1934 – 28 June 1977) was a Polish footballer who played as a forward, most notably for Lechia Gdańsk with whom he spent a season playing in Poland's highest division.

== Biography ==
Born in the Ząbkowice district of Dąbrowa Górnicza, Baran started playing football with his local team Unia Ząbkowice. He played with Unia until 1952, when he joined I liga side Lechia Gdańsk. His Lechia debut came on 9 November 1952 playing in the Polish Cup against Śląsk Wrocław. The following season Baran made his league debut for Lechia, with his I liga debut being made against Lech Poznań. Over the course of the 1953 season Baran made 16 appearances and scored 4 goals for Lechia in Poland's top division. Baran was associated with Lechia until 1956, but didn't make another first team appearance after the 1953 season. In 1957 he returned to Unia Ząbkowice being a player-manager until 1964. In 1977 Baran died from a heart attack aged only 42. He was buried in Dąbrowa Górnicza.
