= Henryk Spodzieja =

Polish footballer

Personal information
- Date of birth: 21 October 1919
- Place of birth: Chorzów, Poland
- Date of death: 27 June 1975 (aged 55)
- Place of death: Bielsko-Biała, Poland
- Height: 1.70 m (5 ft 7 in)
- Position: Forward

Senior career*
Years	Team	Apps	(Gls)
1935–1939	AKS Chorzów		
- Germania Königshütte
- LSV Reinecke
1946–1951	AKS Chorzów		
1952–1953	BKS Stal Bielsko-Biała		
1953–1954	Koszarawa Żywiec		

International career
1947–1949	Poland	9	(3)

Managerial career
- BKS Stal Bielsko-Biała
- * Club domestic league appearances and goals

Henryk Spodzieja (21 October 1919 – 27 June 1975) was a Polish footballer who played as a forward.

He earned nine caps for the Poland national team from 1947 to 1949.
