= Zdzisław Mordarski =

Polish footballer (1922–1991)

Personal information
- Date of birth: 16 June 1922
- Place of birth: Kraków, Poland
- Date of death: 18 February 1991 (aged 68)
- Place of death: Kraków, Poland
- Height: 1.75 m (5 ft 9 in)
- Position: Midfielder

Senior career*
Years	Team	Apps	(Gls)
1936–1937	Grzegórzecki Kraków		
1938–1939	Wisła Kraków		
1945	Orzeł Częstochowa		
1945–1949	Legia Warsaw		
1949–1956	Wisła Kraków		
1956	Cracovia		

International career
1948–1954	Poland	12	(2)
- * Club domestic league appearances and goals

Zdzisław Mordarski (16 June 1922 – 18 February 1991) was a Polish footballer who played as a midfielder. He made twelve appearances for the Poland national team from 1948 to 1954.
