= Ernest Pohl =

Polish footballer (1932–1996)

Personal information
- Date of birth: 3 November 1932
- Place of birth: Ruda Śląska, Poland
- Date of death: 12 September 1995 (aged 62)
- Place of death: Hausach, Germany
- Height: 1.73 m (5 ft 8 in)
- Position: Striker

Senior career*
Years	Team	Apps	(Gls)
1945–1952	Slavia Ruda Śląska		
1952–1953	Orzeł Łódź		
1953–1956	CWKS Warsaw	55	(43)
1957–1967	Górnik Zabrze	209	(143)
1968–1969	Polonia Greenpoint New York		
1969–1970	Vistula Garfield		
Total		264	(186)

International career
1955–1965	Poland	46	(39)
- * Club domestic league appearances and goals

Ernest Pohl (3 November 1932 – 12 September 1995), also known as Ernst Pol, was a Polish footballer who played as a striker. With 186 goals, he is the Polish top division's record goalscorer.

== Career ==
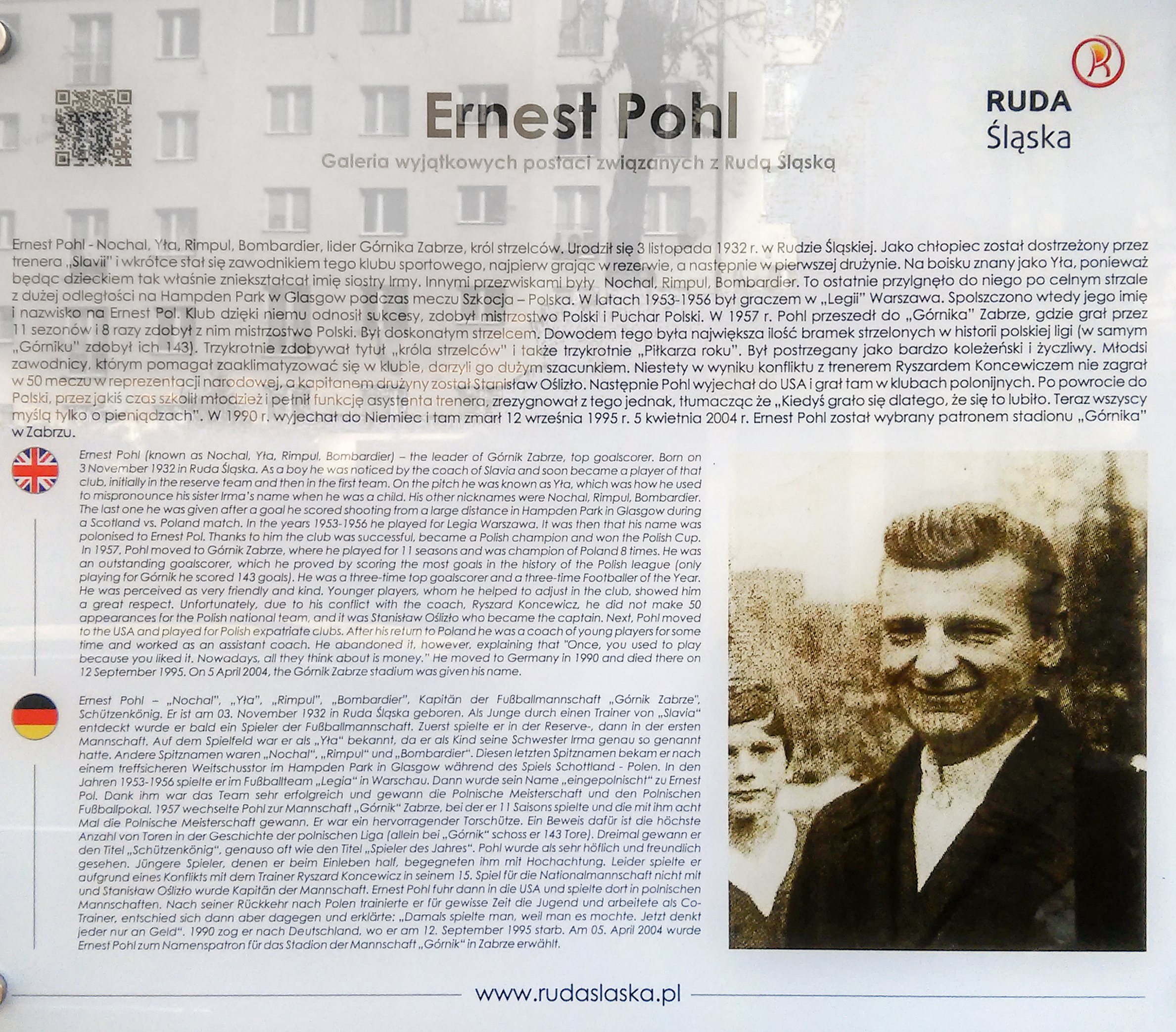
image of Ernest Pohl

Pohl scored 39 goals in 46 international matches for Poland national football team and to this day remains the most prolific Ekstraklasa. He played for Slavia Ruda Śląska, Orzeł Łódź between 1952 and 1953, CWKS Warsaw between 1953 and 1956 and Górnik Zabrze between 1957 and 1967. During the 1960 Summer Olympics in Rome, he scored five goals in a 6–1 win against Tunisia.

Following the fall of the Berlin Wall and German reunification in 1990, he relocated to Germany, where his wife and daughters had moved earlier.

In 2004, Górnik Zabrze's stadium was named after him.

== Names ==
The German surname of the Pohl family was changed to Pol in 1952 as a result of the polonization of names common in Communist Poland. After moving to Germany, he reverted to using his original name.

== Career statistics ==
Appearances and goals by national team and year
National team	Year	Apps	Goals
Poland	1955	1	0
Poland	1956	6	6
Poland	1957	2	0
Poland	1958	1	2
Poland	1959	8	8
Poland	1960	7	8
Poland	1961	5	6
Poland	1962	4	1
Poland	1963	0	0
Poland	1964	4	5
Poland	1965	8	3
Total		46	39

Scores and results list Poland's goal tally first, score column indicates score after each Pohl goal.

List of international goals scored by Ernest Pohl
No.	Date	Venue	Opponent	Score	Result	Competition
1	26 August 1956	Wrocław, Poland	Bulgaria	1–1	1–2	Friendly
2	28 October 1956	Warsaw, Poland	Norway	1–0	5–3	Friendly
3	28 October 1956	Warsaw, Poland	Norway	3–0	5–3	Friendly
4	28 October 1956	Warsaw, Poland	Norway	4–0	5–3	Friendly
5	28 October 1956	Warsaw, Poland	Norway	5–3	5–3	Friendly
6	16 November 1956	Istanbul, Turkey	Turkey	1–0	1–1	Friendly
7	5 October 1958	Dublin, Ireland	Republic of Ireland	1–0	2–2	Friendly
8	5 October 1958	Dublin, Ireland	Republic of Ireland	2–0	2–2	Friendly
9	28 June 1959	Chorzów, Poland	Spain	1–0	2–4	1960 European Nations' Cup qualifying
10	30 August 1959	Warsaw, Poland	Romania	1–1	2–3	Friendly
11	30 August 1959	Warsaw, Poland	Romania	2–2	2–3	Friendly
12	18 October 1959	Helsinki, Finland	Finland	1–0	3–1	1960 Summer Olympics qualification
13	8 November 1959	Chorzów, Poland	Finland	1–1	6–2	1960 Summer Olympics qualification
14	8 November 1959	Chorzów, Poland	Finland	2–1	6–2	1960 Summer Olympics qualification
15	8 November 1959	Chorzów, Poland	Finland	4–2	6–2	1960 Summer Olympics qualification
16	29 November 1959	Tel Aviv, Israel	Israel	1–1	1–1	Friendly
17	4 May 1960	Glasgow, Scotland	Scotland	3–2	3–2	Friendly
18	19 May 1960	Moscow, Soviet Union	Soviet Union	1–4	1–7	Friendly
19	26 August 1960	Rome, Italy	Tunisia	1–1	6–1	1960 Summer Olympics
20	26 August 1960	Rome, Italy	Tunisia	2–1	6–1	1960 Summer Olympics
21	26 August 1960	Rome, Italy	Tunisia	3–1	6–1	1960 Summer Olympics
22	26 August 1960	Rome, Italy	Tunisia	5–1	6–1	1960 Summer Olympics
23	26 August 1960	Rome, Italy	Tunisia	6–1	6–1	1960 Summer Olympics
24	13 November 1960	Budapest, Hungary	Hungary	1–2	1–4	Friendly
25	21 May 1961	Warsaw, Poland	Soviet Union	1–0	1–0	Friendly
26	22 October 1961	Wrocław, Poland	East Germany	2–1	3–1	Friendly
27	22 October 1961	Wrocław, Poland	East Germany	3–1	3–1	Friendly
28	5 November 1961	Chorzów, Poland	Denmark	1–0	5–0	Friendly
29	5 November 1961	Chorzów, Poland	Denmark	3–0	5–0	Friendly
30	5 November 1961	Chorzów, Poland	Denmark	5–0	5–0	Friendly
31	11 April 1962	Paris, France	France	1–1	3–1	Friendly
32	13 September 1964	Warsaw, Poland	Czechoslovakia	1–0	2–1	Friendly
33	13 September 1964	Warsaw, Poland	Czechoslovakia	2–1	2–1	Friendly
34	27 September 1964	Istanbul, Turkey	Turkey	3–1	3–2	Friendly
35	7 October 1964	Solna, Sweden	Sweden	1–2	3–3	Friendly
36	25 October 1964	Dublin, Ireland	Republic of Ireland	2–0	2–3	Friendly
37	16 May 1965	Kraków, Poland	Bulgaria	1–0	1–1	Friendly
38	13 October 1965	Glasgow, Scotland	Scotland	1–1	2–1	1966 FIFA World Cup qualification
39	24 October 1965	Szczecin, Poland	Finland	4–0	7–0	1966 FIFA World Cup qualification

== Honours ==
Legia Warsaw

- Ekstraklasa: 1955, 1956
- Polish Cup: 1954–55, 1955–56

Górnik Zabrze

- Ekstraklasa: 1957, 1959, 1961, 1962–63, 1963–64, 1964–65, 1965–66, 1966–67
- Polish Cup: 1964–65

Individual

- Ekstraklasa top scorer: 1954, 1961, 1963–64
- Ekstraklasa Hall of Fame: 2024
