= Ewald Wiśniowski =

Polish footballer (1927–1970)

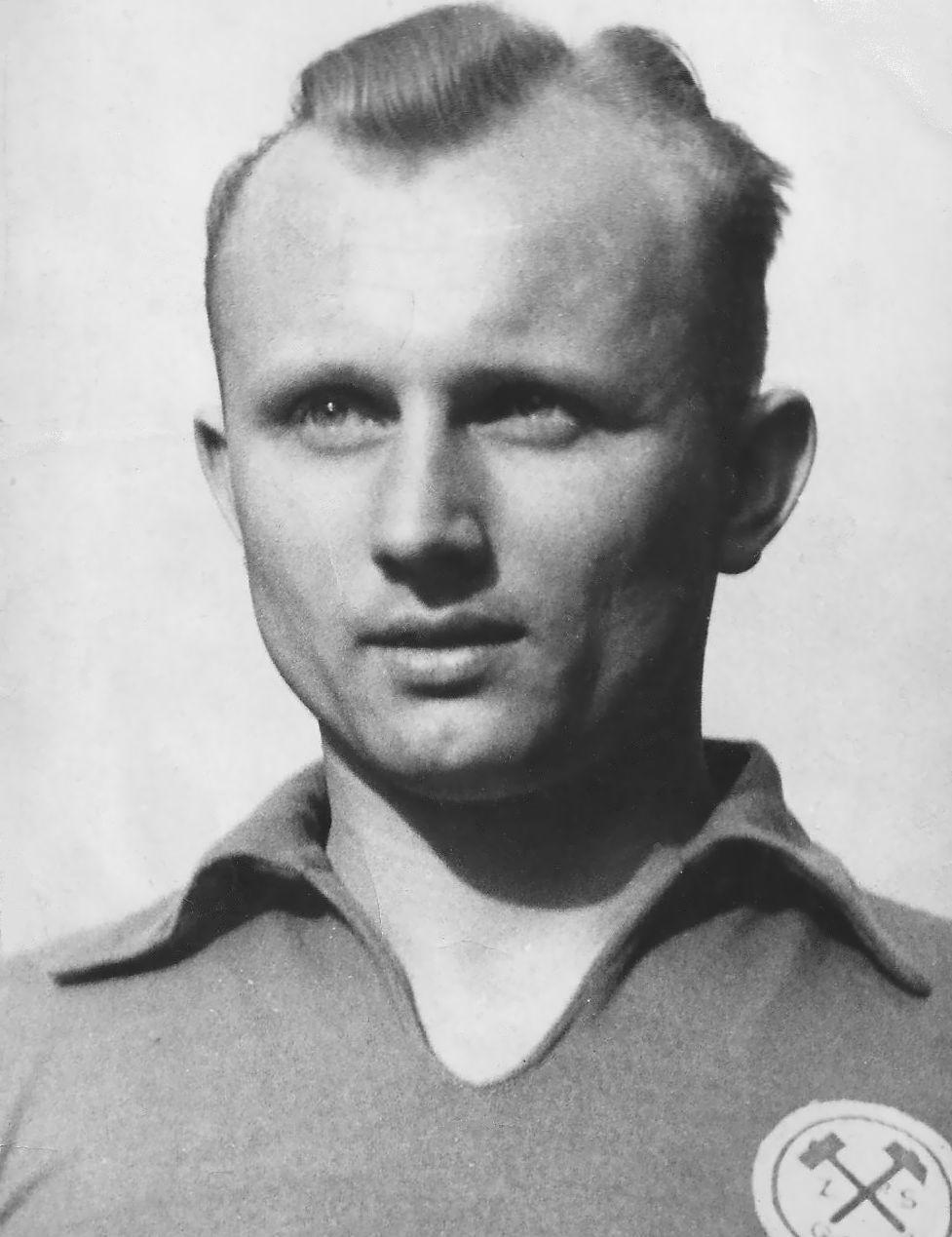

Personal information
- Date of birth: 24 November 1927
- Place of birth: Bogucice, Poland
- Date of death: 23 June 1970 (aged 42)
- Place of death: Zabrze, Poland
- Height: 1.70 m (5 ft 7 in)
- Position: Forward

Senior career*
Years	Team	Apps	(Gls)
1941–1944	Gwiazda Bogucice		
1945	KS 20 Katowice		
1945	Pocztowy KS Katowice		
1946–1948	Pogoń Barlinek		
1948–1950	KS 20 Katowice		
1951–1954	Górnik Radlin		
1954	Górnik Zabrze		
1955	Motor Lublin		
1955–1957	Górnik Zabrze		
1958–1961	Górnik 20 Katowice		

International career
1953	Poland	1	(1)
- * Club domestic league appearances and goals

Ewald Wiśniowski (24 November 1927 – 23 June 1970) was a Polish footballer who played as a forward.

He made one appearance for the Poland national team in 1953.

== Honours ==
Górnik Zabrze

- Ekstraklasa: 1957
