= Jan Wiktor Wiśniewski =

Polish footballer

Jan Wiśniewski
Personal information
- Full name: Jan Wiktor Wiśniewski
- Date of birth: 1 May 1922
- Place of birth: Ringsted, Denmark
- Date of death: 10 March 2006 (aged 83)
- Place of death: Rzeszów, Poland
- Height: 1.63 m (5 ft 4 in)
- Position: Forward

Senior career*
Years	Team	Apps	(Gls)
- Sokół Lviv
1938–1939	ZZK Lviv		
1944	Lokomotiv Lviv		
1946–1954	Polonia Bytom	104	(41)
1955–1956	Ruch Chorzów	32	(15)

International career
1949–1952	Poland	9	(1)
- * Club domestic league appearances and goals

Jan Wiktor Wiśniewski (1 May 1922 – 10 March 2006) was a Polish footballer who played as a forward. He competed in the 1952 Summer Olympics.

== Honours ==
Polonia Bytom

- Ekstraklasa: 1954
