= Henryk Szymborski =

Polish footballer

Personal information
- Date of birth: 18 January 1931
- Place of birth: Dąbrówka Mała, Poland
- Date of death: 30 August 2008 (aged 77)
- Place of death: Katowice, Poland
- Height: 1.76 m (5 ft 9 in)
- Position: Forward

Senior career*
Years	Team	Apps	(Gls)
–1944	TuS Bogucice		
1945	Pogoń Katowice		
1945–1950	KS 22 Dąbrówka Mała		
1950	Włókniarz Trzebinia		
1950–1952	ŁKS Łódź		
1952–1953	Legia Warsaw		
1954	Odra Opole		
1955–1963	ŁKS Łódź		
1964–1965	Włókniarz Łódź		
1966–1969	Kudowianka Kudowa-Zdrój		

International career
1951–1958	Poland	6	(0)
- * Club domestic league appearances and goals

Henryk Szymborski (18 January 1931 – 30 August 2008) was a Polish footballer who played as a forward.

He played in six matches for the Poland national team from 1951 to 1958.

== Honours ==
ŁKS Łodź

- Ekstraklasa: 1958
- Polish Cup: 1956–57
