= Krzysztof Baszkiewicz =

Polish footballer (1933–1993)

Personal information
- Full name: Krzysztof Stanisław Baszkiewicz
- Date of birth: 27 October 1933
- Place of birth: Warsaw, Poland
- Date of death: 25 November 1993 (aged 60)
- Place of death: Warsaw, Poland
- Height: 1.72 m (5 ft 8 in)
- Position: Winger

Youth career
- 1947–1949: OMTUR Bielany
- 1949–1950: Budowlani Wola

Senior career*
Years	Team	Apps	(Gls)
1950–1953	Lechia Gdańsk	23	(13)
1953–1962	Gwardia Warsaw	173	(66)
Total		196	(79)

International career
1955–1960	Poland	20	(4)
- * Club domestic league appearances and goals

Krzysztof Baszkiewicz (27 October 1933 – 25 November 1993) was a Polish footballer who played as a winger for Lechia Gdańsk and Gwardia Warsaw.

== Biography ==
Baszkiewicz started his career playing football for the youth levels at OMTUR Bielany and Budowlani Wola, joining Lechia Gdańsk in 1950. Baszkiewicz made his league debut against Polonia Świdnica, scoring his first goal for the club in the same match. In total, he played 40 times scoring 18 goals with Lechia before the age of 20. In 1953, he joined Gwardia Warsaw, playing the next 11 seasons with the club. In total for Gwardia, he played 173 times in the league, scoring 66 goals, and he became the first Polish player to score in a European club competition in 1955 scoring against Djurgården in Sweden. At the age of 27, Baszkiewicz suffered from injuries, retiring at the age of 30 having played rarely in his final three seasons. Baszkiewicz played 20 times for the Poland national team, scoring four times for his country.

== Honours ==
Gwardia Warsaw

- Polish Cup: 1953–54
