= Gerard Cieślik =

Polish footballer (1927–2013)

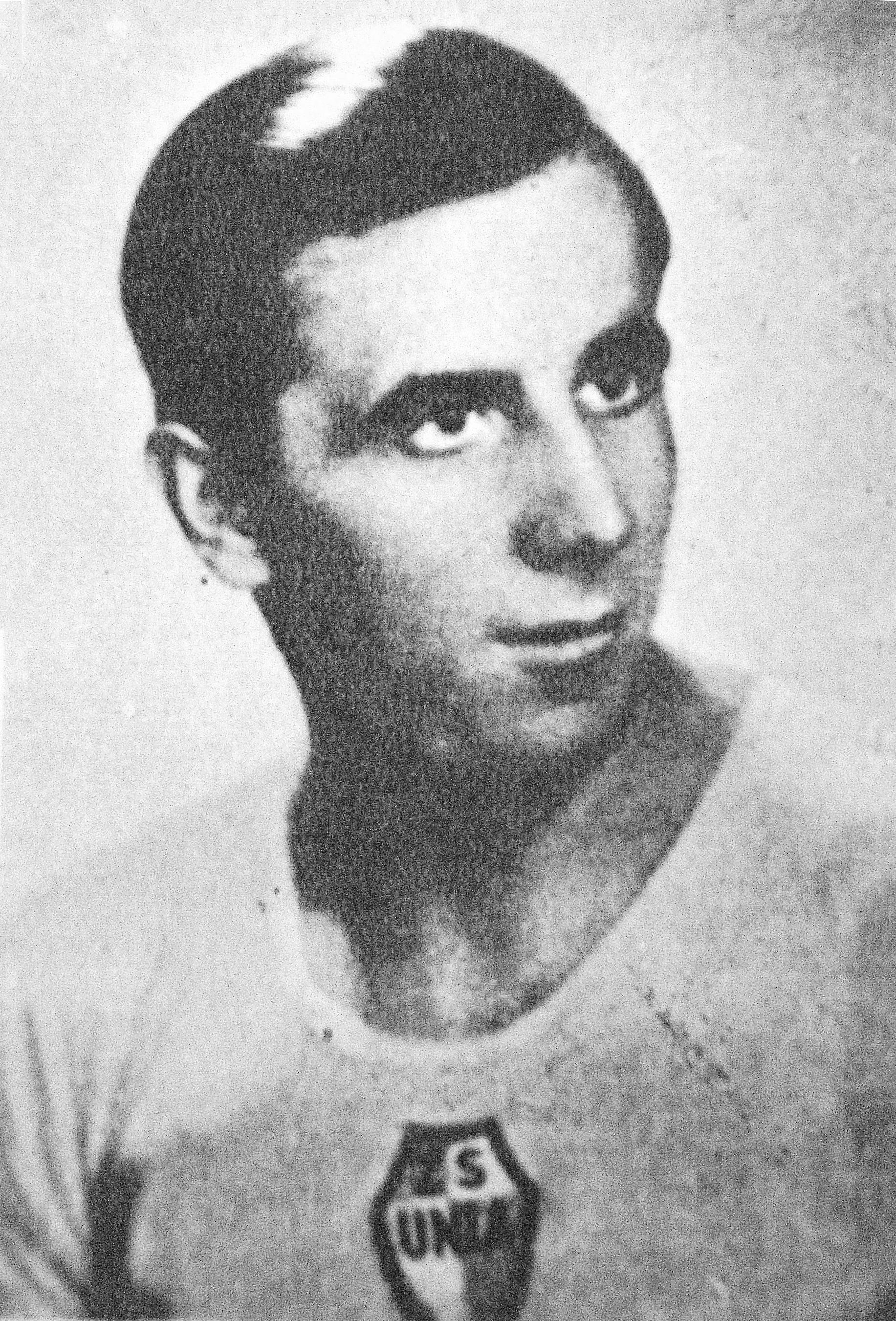

Personal information
- Full name: Gerard Józef Cieślik
- Date of birth: 27 April 1927
- Place of birth: Hajduki Wielkie, Poland
- Date of death: 3 November 2013 (aged 86)
- Place of death: Chorzów, Poland
- Height: 1.63 m (5 ft 4 in)
- Position: Striker

Youth career
- 1939–1944: Bismarckhütter Ballspiel Club

Senior career*
Years	Team	Apps	(Gls)
1944–1959	Ruch Chorzów	237	(167)

International career
1947–1958	Poland	45	(27)

Managerial career
- 1946: Grunwald Ruda Śląska
- 1956: Prosna Wieruszów
- 1958: Concordia Knurów
- 1961: Ruch Chorzów
- 1964–1966: MKS Lędziny
- 1968–1969: Unia Racibórz
- AKS Chorzów
- Urania Ruda Śląska
- * Club domestic league appearances and goals

Gerard Cieślik (27 April 1927 – 3 November 2013), also known as Gienek, was a Polish footballer who played as a striker. Playing for the Poland national team, he is most noted for having scored two goals against the Soviet Union on 20 October 1957 at Stadion Śląski. The rather small striker (163 cm, 59 kg) was capped 45 times and scored 27 goals. He also played for Poland at the 1952 Summer Olympics.

== Biography ==
Born in Hajduki Wielkie, now a part of Chorzów, he spent his entire career with Ruch, from July 1939 to June 1959, a tenure which included victory in the 1951 Polish Cup, and three Ekstraklasa titles (1951, 1952, 1953). In total, he scored 177 goals for Ruch. He became the club's coach and scout in 1959, and having never cut ties with the team, is seen as a great example of loyalty within the Polish game.

He was drafted and served in the Wehrmacht from 1944 to 1945 and transferred to Denmark.

In 2003, after a particular group of Ruch fans controversially displayed a banner with the German name for Upper Silesia, Cieslik expressed his opposition to the banner and urged the fans to respect the memory of the club's founders who had been patriots and participated in the Silesian Uprisings against German rule of Silesia.

In 2006, the documentary film Das Alphabet von Gerard Cieślik was presented by Antena Górnośląska as part of the exhibition Oberschlesier in der deutschen und polnischen Fußballnationalmannschaft – gestern und heute. Sport und Politik in Oberschlesien im 20. Jahrhundert covering Upper Silesians who played for the Poland national team and/or the Germany national team.

In 2006, he signed a protest against the politician Roman Giertych.

== Career statistics ==
=== International ===
Appearances and goals by national team and year
National team	Year	Apps	Goals
Poland	1947	7	7
Poland	1948	7	3
Poland	1949	4	3
Poland	1950	5	5
Poland	1951	1	0
Poland	1952	4	0
Poland	1953	2	0
Poland	1954	2	1
Poland	1955	3	3
Poland	1956	2	0
Poland	1957	3	2
Poland	1958	5	3
Total		45	27

== Honours ==
Ruch Chorzów

- Ekstraklasa: 1951, 1952, 1953
- Polish Cup: 1951

Individual

- Ekstraklasa top scorer: 1952, 1953
- Order of Polonia Restituta: 1999

== See also ==
- Sport in Poland
- List of Polish football players
