= Józef Kohut =

Polish footballer (1922–1970)

Personal information
- Date of birth: 16 December 1922
- Place of birth: Kraków, Poland
- Date of death: 3 January 1970 (aged 47)
- Place of death: Kraków, Poland
- Position: Striker

Senior career*
| Years | Team | Apps | (Gls) |
| 1935–1944 | Nadwiślanin Kraków | | |
| 1944–1946 | Wisła Kraków | | |
| 1946 | Pancerni Modlin | | |
| 1946–1947 | Legia Warsaw | | |
| 1948–1954 | Wisła Kraków | | |

International career
| 1948–1953 | Poland | 11 | (4) |
- * Club domestic league appearances and goals

Józef Kohut (16 December 1922 – 3 January 1970) was a Polish footballer who played as a striker, spending most of his career with Wisła Kraków. He was a top goalscorer of Ekstraklasa in the 1948 season, scoring 31 goals. Kohut played 11 times for Poland national team, scoring four goals.

== Honours ==
Wisła Kraków

- Ekstraklasa: 1949, 1950

Individual

- Ekstraklasa top scorer: 1948
