= Stanisław Hachorek =

Polish footballer and coach

Personal information
- Full name: Stanisław Marian Hachorek
- Date of birth: 21 January 1927
- Place of birth: Czeladź, Poland
- Date of death: 24 October 1988 (aged 61)
- Place of death: Warsaw, Poland
- Height: 1.71 m (5 ft 7 in)
- Position: Forward

Senior career*
Years	Team	Apps	(Gls)
1945–1947	CKS Czeladź		
1947–1948	WMKS Katowice		
1948–1962	Gwardia Warsaw		
1962–1965	Warszawianka		

International career
1955–1960	Poland	16	(8)

Managerial career
- Warszawianka
- Żyrardowianka Żyrardów
- Drukarz Warsaw
- RKS Błonie
- * Club domestic league appearances and goals

Stanisław Marian Hachorek (21 January 1927 – 24 October 1988) was a Polish footballer and manager.

Hachorek, who began playing football in 1945 in CKS Czeladź, spent best years of his career in Gwardia Warsaw, a team that in the 1950s was among top Polish sides. Between 1955 and 1960, he capped sixteen times for Poland, scoring eight goals. He debuted on 29 May 1955 in Bucharest, scoring a goal in a 2–2 tie against Romania. In the same year, he became top goalscorer of the Ekstraklasa, with sixteen goals. Hachorek participated in the 1960 Summer Olympics in Rome, where he scored a goal in Poland's 6–1 victory over Tunisia.

He spent last years of his career in Warszawianka, and after retirement from active playing (1965), became a coach.

== Honours ==
Gwardia Warsaw

- Polish Cup: 1953–54

Individual

- Ekstraklasa top scorer: 1955
