= Górnik Radlin =

Polish sports club based in Radlin

- Sports: Football, Volleyball, Gymnastics, Swimming and Fencing
- Founded: 1923
- Based in: Radlin, Silesian Voivodeship
- Colors: Blue and white

Klub Sportowy Górnik Radlin is a Polish sports club based in Radlin. It has football, volleyball, gymnastics, swimming and fencing sections. The volleyball team plays in the Polish Volleyball League (Polska Liga Siatkówki, PLS) and the football team has previously played in the Ekstraklasa.

== History ==
Górnik Radlin was founded in 1923.

From 1975 until 1997, the club took the name "Górnik Radlin" Wodzisław Śląski, as the Radlin was a district of the city of Wodzisław Śląski.

== Gymnastics ==
Gymnasts Paweł Gaca, Paweł Gawron, and Ryszard Kucjas, who competed at the 1952 Summer Olympics, were the first members of the gymnastics club to appear in Olympic competition. They were followed by Ernest Hawełek in 1960.

A large contingent of members appeared between the 1964 and 1972 Olympics, which saw Jerzy Kruża alongside brothers Mikołaj Kubica, Wilhelm Kubica, and Sylwester Kubica representing Poland during this period.

Marian Pieczka was the last gymnast to represent the club at the 1976 Summer Olympics.

== Volleyball ==
=== 2003–04 season ===
2nd place in Seria B, promotion to PLS Seria A.

=== 2004–05 season ===
The team will play Polish Volleyball League (Seria A). Kadra III-liga – rozgrywki 2013–14. 1.Barteczko Adam - rozgrywający - kapitan 2. Gilner Kamil - libero 3.Porwoł Robert - atakujący 4.Wowra Bartłomiej - libero 5. Graff Karol - rozgrywający 6.Kołodziejski Sebastian - przyjmujący 7.Koczwara Adrian - środkowy 8.Mielnik Mateusz - przyjmujący 9.Radomski Krzysztof - przyjmujący 10. Grzywacz Patryk - środkowy 11. Harazim Damian - przyjmujący 12.Olszewski Dawid - środkowy 13.Turek Sebastian - atakujący 15.Marcol Jarosław - rozgrywający 16.Kaczmarek Kamil - środkowy I TRENER - Marek Przybys

== Football ==
=== Achievements ===
Górnik Radlin's greatest Achievements in the Ekstraklasa are:

1. Placing Second in the league in 1950/51.
2. The Polish Cup Quarter-Finals in the Season 1953/54.
3. Winning the Second League three times: 1949, 1956, and 1958.

== See also ==
- Volleyball in Poland
- Football in Poland
- Sports in Poland
