= AKS Chorzów =

Polish sports club

- Full name: Amatorski Klub Sportowy Wyzwolenie Chorzów
- Nicknames: Zielone Koniczynki (The Green Clovers)
- Founded: 22 August 1910; 115 years ago
- Ground: ul. Lompy 10a, 41–500 Chorzów
- Manager: Mirosław Werner
- League: Katowice 1 Group of Liga okręgowa (VI)
- 2014–15: Katowice 2 Group of Liga okręgowa (VI), 4th
- Website: https://web.archive.org/web/20101111173539/http://www.akswyzwolenie.com.pl/

AKS Chorzów is a sports club based in Chorzów, Poland. It is one of the earliest sports organizations in Upper Silesia and is known nationally for its football and handball teams. The club also made its mark on the international stage: Halina Richter-Górecka was part of the gold medal-winning women's 100m relay team at the 1964 Tokyo Olympic Games; tennis player Danuta Wieczorek appeared at Wimbledon as a junior.

== History ==
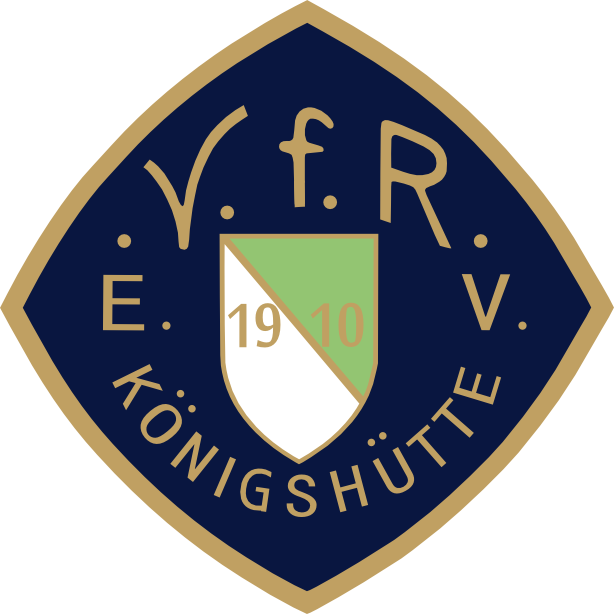
Logo of VfR Königshütte

The origins of the club go back to the founding of the German football club VfR Königshütte on 22 August 1910 in what was at the time the coal mining city of Königshütte in Germany. In the early 1920s, the region became part of Poland and the city was renamed, with the football club becoming Amatorski Klub Sportowy Chorzów.

In 1927 AKS was the owner of a modern stadium facility in Poland at Chorzów's Wyzwolenia Hill. The stadium was sometimes shared with another local team — Ruch Chorzów.

The club won the championship of Polish Upper Silesia (Silesian A-Class) in 1924, 1930 and 1936, and in 1937 advanced to the Polish first division where they became an immediate success. They finished as vice-champions and the team's Jerzy Wostal was the top scorer in the league with 12 goals. Wostal and teammate Leonard Piątek were among several players who played for the Polish national side in the 1930s. In 1939, AKS had as many as 10 football teams, including various youth teams, which was more than any other football organization of the Second Polish Republic.

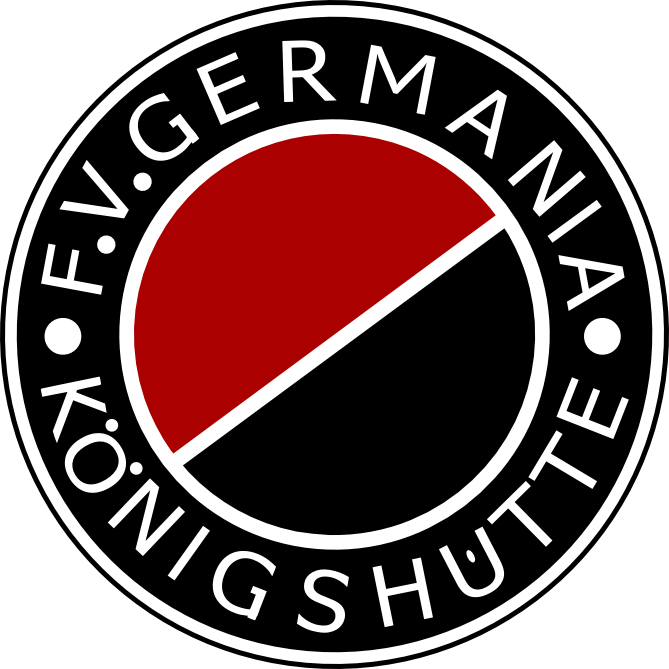
Logo of FV Germania Königshütte

After the outbreak of World War II in 1939, Germany occupied the western half of Poland. AKS became Fussball Verein Germania Königshütte and in 1940 joined Germany's first division Gauliga Schlesien where they finished atop the table. Piatek Germanized his name to Piontek and was a key player as FV Königshütte became the dominant side in the division, far outperforming state-supported rival 1. FC Kattowitz. The club earned division titles in the Gauliga Oberschlesien in 1942, 1943, and 1944, advancing to play in the regional qualifying rounds of the German national championships, where they were put out in the early going each year. Germania also made first round appearances in play for the Tschammerpokal, predecessor of today's DFB-Pokal (German Cup), in 1941 and 1942.

After the war and the restoration of the area to Poland, the club re-assumed its Polish name and continued to be a power in the country's football, earning third-place results in 1946 and 1947. In 1948 AKS joined the newly re-established Polish first division as Budowlani Chorzów and played there for seven years until being relegated after the 1954 season. The club played second division football until 1958 then faded into obscurity, with some supporters claiming that team's German origins and history of success in the Nazi-sponsored Gauliga put it into disfavour with Communist Poland's sporting authorities, contributing to the team's decline.

In the 60s the Chorzów's once beautiful stadium burned to the ground to be replaced by a supermarket. In the early 1990s the club merged with Chorzowianka Chorzów and plays today as the sixth division side AKS Wyzwolenie Chorzów.

== Naming timeline ==
- 1910: Verein für Rasenspiele (VfR) Königshütte
- 1924: Amatorski Klub Sportowy (AKS) Królewska Huta
- 1934: AKS Chorzów (change in name of city)
- 1939-1945: defunct: club temporarily replaced by newly established club FV Germania Königshütte O/S
- 1949: Budowlani Chorzów
- 1955: AKS Chorzów
- 1995: AKS Chorzowianka Chorzów (merger with Chorzowianka Chorzów)
- 2000: AKS Wyzwolenie Chorzów (merger with Wyzwolenie Chorzów)

== Honours (football) ==
- Polish vice-champions: 1937
- 3rd place in Polish Ekstraklasa (Main League): 1946, 1947, 1951
- Autonomous Silesian Voivodeship (Poland) champions: 1924, 1930, 1936
- Silesia champions (Germany): 1941
- Upper Silesia champions (Germany): 1942, 1943, 1944

== Handball ==
Formed before the World War II, the club's handball department came to prominence after 1945. The team drew crowds of 5,000 at the height of its popularity and in the 1980s won several national titles.

== Honours (handball) ==
- Polish champions: 1981, 1982, 1988
- Polish vice-champions: 1960

== Nickname ==
- The team was nicknamed the "Green Clovers".
