= 1963–64 Ekstraklasa =

38th season of top-tier football league in Poland

Liga
- Season: 1963–64
- Champions: Górnik Zabrze (5th title)
- Relegated: Wisła Kraków; Arkonia Szczecin
- Top goalscorer: Lucjan Brychczy; Józef Gałeczka; Jerzy Wilim (14 goals)

Statistics of Ekstraklasa for the 1963–64 season.

== Overview ==
It was contested by 14 teams, and Górnik Zabrze won the championship.

== League table ==
Pos	Team	Pld	W	D	L	GF	GA	GD	Pts	Qualification or relegation
1	Górnik Zabrze (C)	26	17	6	3	57	23	+34	40	Qualification to European Cup preliminary round
2	Zagłębie Sosnowiec	26	13	5	8	55	41	+14	31	
3	Odra Opole	26	12	7	7	42	31	+11	31	
4	Legia Warsaw	26	13	5	8	44	36	+8	31	Qualification to Cup Winners' Cup first round
5	Polonia Bytom	26	11	5	10	39	33	+6	27	
6	Szombierki Bytom	26	10	6	10	45	42	+3	26	
7	Ruch Chorzów	26	8	8	10	34	38	−4	24	
8	Unia Racibórz	26	8	8	10	45	51	−6	24	
9	Gwardia Warsaw	26	8	8	10	35	41	−6	24	
10	ŁKS Łódź	26	9	5	12	27	37	−10	23	
11	Stal Rzeszów	26	8	7	11	32	44	−12	23	
12	Pogoń Szczecin	26	7	7	12	29	36	−7	21	
13	Wisła Kraków (R)	26	6	9	11	29	45	−16	21	Relegated to II liga
14	Arkonia Szczecin (R)	26	5	8	13	30	45	−15	18	Relegated to II liga

Source: 90minut.pl (in Polish)
(C) Champions; (R) Relegated

== Results ==
Home \ Away	AKN	GÓR	GWA	LEG	ŁKS	OOP	POG	BYT	RUC	SRZ	SZB	UNI	WIS	ZSO
Arkonia Szczecin		3–3	2–2	1–0	3–1	1–1	0–1	1–4	1–1	1–1	2–0	4–2	0–1	1–2
Górnik Zabrze	2–0		3–1	5–0	2–1	1–0	4–1	1–2	3–1	3–0	2–1	2–0	4–0	7–1
Gwardia Warsaw	2–0	1–2		2–4	1–1	1–1	2–0	2–0	3–0	0–0	1–2	2–1	0–0	1–0
Legia Warsaw	5–1	2–0	1–2		1–0	0–0	5–2	1–0	4–0	1–0	3–2	0–2	2–2	1–1
ŁKS Łódź	1–0	0–1	3–0	1–4		1–1	2–1	0–3	2–1	1–0	0–1	0–1	1–0	1–0
Odra Opole	3–1	1–1	2–0	1–0	3–2		4–1	3–1	2–0	1–0	3–2	1–3	2–4	3–1
Pogoń Szczecin	1–2	0–0	5–3	1–1	1–2	1–0		1–0	0–0	0–1	1–0	1–1	6–0	2–1
Polonia Bytom	1–1	1–2	5–1	0–1	2–0	1–1	2–1		2–2	3–2	1–1	2–1	3–0	1–1
Ruch Chorzów	2–0	2–0	0–2	4–0	0–0	1–2	0–0	1–0		3–0	2–0	3–4	0–0	3–1
Stal Rzeszów	2–1	1–1	1–1	1–3	5–2	3–2	2–1	2–1	3–1		1–2	2–1	2–2	1–3
Szombierki Bytom	1–1	0–3	3–1	3–1	2–2	1–1	1–0	1–2	4–0	0–0		4–0	3–3	1–3
Unia Racibórz	2–2	2–2	2–1	2–2	2–0	0–2	1–1	4–0	3–3	2–2	2–5		1–0	1–1
Wisła Kraków	2–0	3–3	1–1	1–2	1–1	1–0	0–0	1–3	0–2	3–0	0–2	3–2		1–2
Zagłębie Sosnowiec	2–1	0–2	2–2	2–0	1–2	3–2	2–0	3–0	2–2	5–0	7–3	6–3	3–0	

Source: 90minut.pl (in Polish)
Legend: Blue = home team win; Yellow = draw; Red = away team win.

== Top goalscorers ==
Rank	Player	Club	Goals
1	(Poland) Lucjan Brychczy	Legia Warsaw	18
1	(Poland) Józef Gałeczka	Zagłębie Sosnowiec	18
1	(Poland) Jerzy Wilim	Szombierki Bytom	18
4	(Poland) Joachim Marx	Gwardia Warsaw	16
5	(Poland) Manfred Urbas	Unia Racibórz	14
6	(Poland) Jan Liberda	Polonia Bytom	13
6	(Poland) Ernest Pol	Górnik Zabrze	13
8	(Poland) Engelbert Jarek	Odra Opole	12
8	(Poland) Włodzimierz Lubański	Górnik Zabrze	12
10	(Poland) Władysław Gzel	Arkonia Szczecin	11

== Attendances ==
#	Club	Average
1	Górnik Zabrze	16,692
2	Pogoń Szczecin	16,000
3	Zagłębie Sosnowiec	15,231
4	Stal Rzeszów	13,846
5	Ruch Chorzów	12,077
6	ŁKS	12,077
7	Wisła Kraków	11,846
8	Legia Warszawa	10,538
9	Polonia Bytom	10,462
10	Arkonia Szczecin	9,462
11	Unia Racibórz	9,038
12	Odra Opole	8,692
13	Szombierki Bytom	8,462
14	Gwardia Warszawa	6,308
