= Lucjan Brychczy =

Polish footballer (1934–2024)

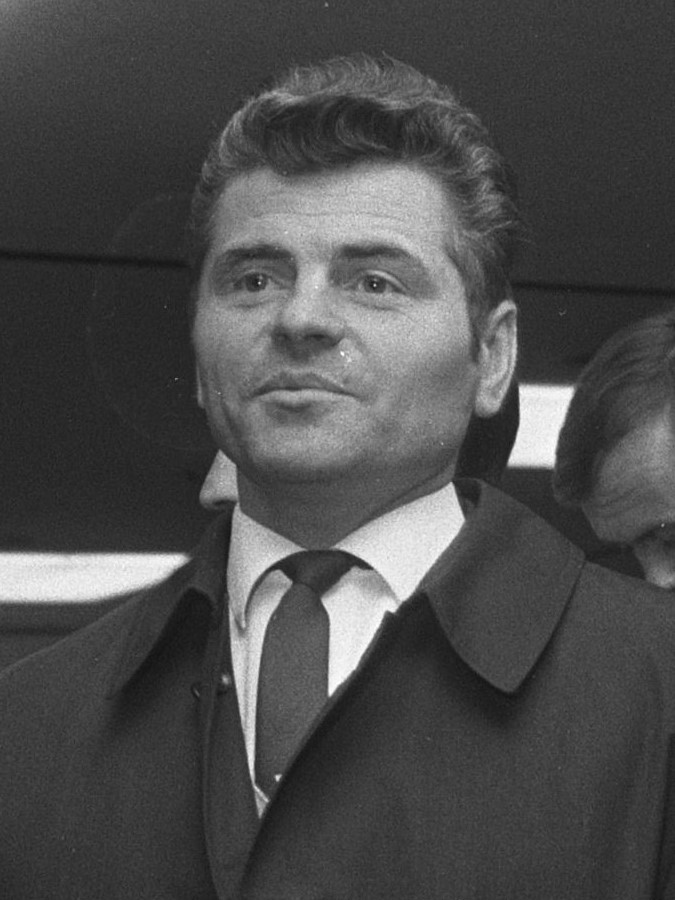
- Lucjan Brychczy in 1970

Personal information
- Full name: Lucjan Antoni Brychczy
- Date of birth: 13 June 1934
- Place of birth: Nowy Bytom, Poland
- Date of death: 2 December 2024 (aged 90)
- Place of death: Warsaw, Poland
- Height: 1.66 m (5 ft 5 in)
- Position: Striker

Youth career
- –1948: Pogoń Nowy Bytom
- 1948–1953: ŁTS Łabędy Gliwice

Senior career*
Years	Team	Apps	(Gls)
–1948	Pogoń Nowy Bytom		
1949–1953	ŁTS Łabędy Gliwice		
1954	Piast Gliwice		
1954–1972	Legia Warsaw	368	(182)

International career
1954–1969	Poland	58	(18)

Managerial career
- 1972–1973: Legia Warsaw
- 1979–1980: Legia Warsaw
- 1987: Legia Warsaw
- 1990: Legia Warsaw
- * Club domestic league appearances and goals

Lucjan Antoni Brychczy (nicknamed Kici; 13 June 1934 – 2 December 2024) was a Polish footballer who played as a striker. Born in New Bytom, Upper Silesia, where after starting at local lower league clubs, he played for nearby the then third division Piast Gliwice.

He then transferred to Legia Warsaw, where the rest of career was linked with and one that earned him notoriety. He won four national titles with them, in 1955, 1956, 1969 and 1970 as well as four domestic cups, in 1955, 1956, 1964 and 1966. He scored 182 goals during his stint which lasted 19 seasons, both of which remain club records to this day. His Legia career also included a foray into the semi-finals of the European Cup. He was also part of Poland's squad at the 1960 Summer Olympics. After retiring from playing, he became one of Legia's coaching staff, which included short periods of being the first team manager.

== Biography ==
=== Early life and career ===
He was born on 13 June 1934, in Nowy Bytom. His father was Stanisław Brychczy, a Silesian Uprising participant and a lieutenant in the Polish army, and his mother, Maria Brychczy, was a homemaker. He had three siblings: Mieczysław, Helena, and Tadeusz, and he was the youngest in the family. His father was conscripted into the army in September 1939 and returned to the family only after the war.

He began his adventure with sports in the boxing section of the local club Pogoń Nowy Bytom. After being forbidden by his father, he switched to the football section. In 1949, his father was employed at the Military Mechanical Works in Łabędy (district of Gliwice), where he moved with his entire family. There, Lucjan Brychczy joined the ŁTS Łabędy club, where he was quickly promoted to the senior team, coached by former Polish national team player Karol Dziwisz. He combined playing football with working at the military factory.

Karol Dziwisz was also the coach of the voivodeship team, and at the time, he called up the 18-year-old Brychczy to join the squad. In 1953, the regional team played against the Polish national B team, ending in a 3:3 draw, with Brychczy scoring a hat-trick. Following this match, he was called up for a national B team game against Tirana in Warsaw. The match was held at Legia Warsaw's stadium, marking Brychczy's first visit to the city and the venue.

After the game, Brychczy, along with his brother Tadeusz, moved to nearby Piast Gliwice, a third-division team aiming for promotion to a higher league in the 1954 season. After six months of playing for Piast, Brychczy was conscripted into the army and assigned to play for Legia Warsaw, the central military club. Legia was coached by Hungarian János Steiner, who aimed to build a strong team modeled after Honvéd Budapest.

=== Legia player ===
Even before making his debut for Legia, Brychczy was called up to the Polish national team for a match against Bulgaria, held at Legia's stadium. Brychczy made his debut on 8 August 1954 in the second half of the game, which ended in a 2:2 draw.

During one of the training sessions, coach Steiner gave Brychczy the nickname "Kici," which stuck with him throughout his career. "Kici" is a Polonized version of the Hungarian word kicsi, meaning "small." Legia's situation was difficult, as the team had earned only 6 points after 10 matches in the first round and was on the brink of relegation. There was even consideration of disbanding the football section. Brychczy made his debut on 12 September 1954, in a match against Ruch Chorzów, which ended in a 0:1 defeat. However, a subsequent series of victories allowed Legia to avoid relegation.

Legia began the 1955 season much stronger, quickly establishing itself as one of the league's top teams. A major success came with a 5:0 victory in the Polish Cup final against Lechia Gdańsk. This was Brychczy's first career trophy and the first in Legia's history.

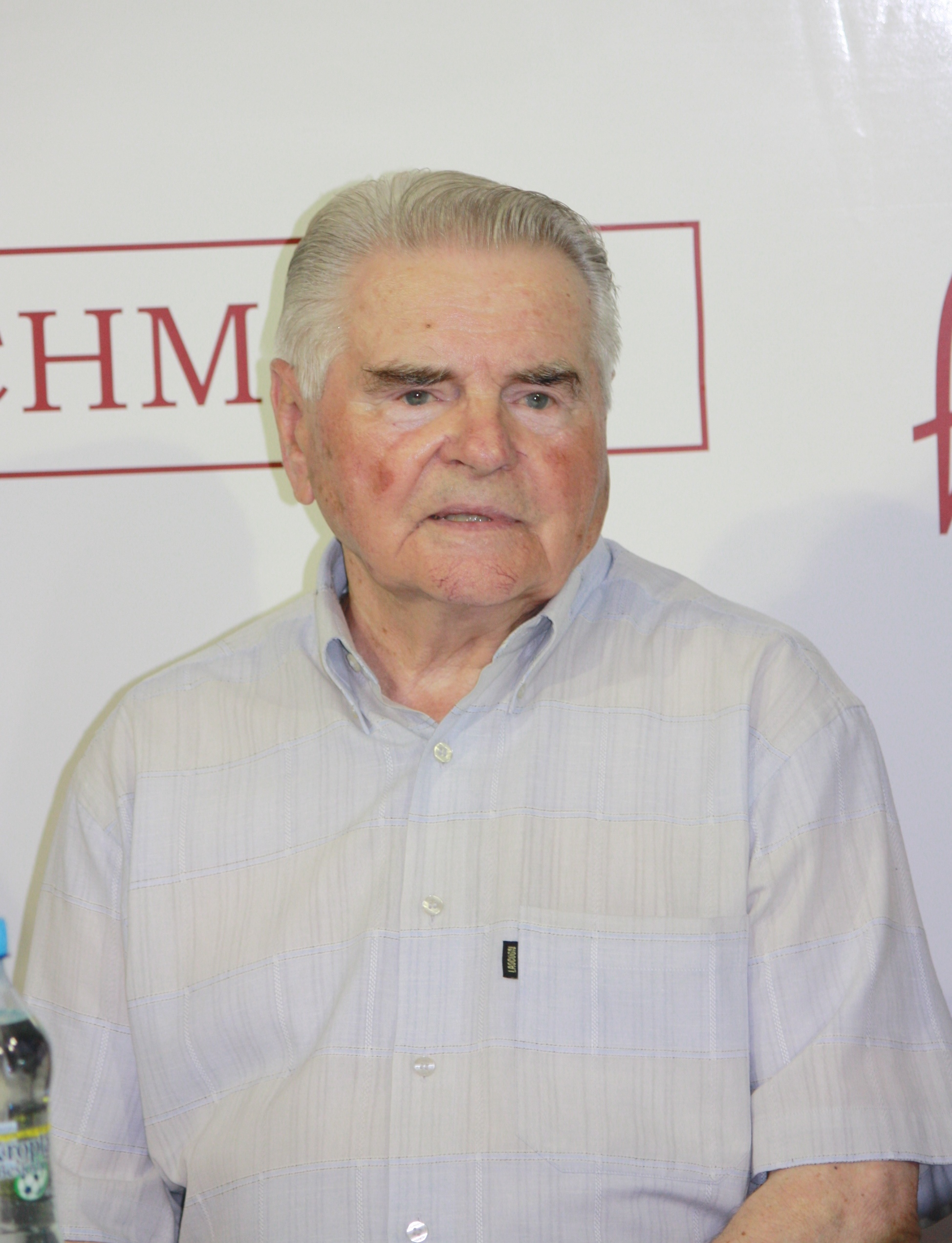
Lucjan Brychczy in 2014

He won four titles with Legia, in 1955, 1956, 1969 and 1970 as well as four Polish Cups, in 1955, 1956, 1964 and 1966. He scored 182 goals during his stint which lasted 19 seasons, both of which remain club records to this day. His Legia career also included a foray into the semi-finals of the European Cup. He was also part of Poland's squad at the 1960 Summer Olympics.

It is said that Real Madrid and AC Milan were interested in securing his services but during that time it was impossible to leave the country due to the restrictions of the communist regime.

=== Later life ===
Brychczy lived for many years in an apartment on the sixth floor at the corner of Świętokrzyska and Emilii Plater streets. He enjoyed playing cards, had a fear of flying, and was a fan of television series. In 1998, he was attacked in a stairwell after withdrawing a large sum of money from the bank, which resulted in an open clavicle fracture. Brychczy was awarded the Officer's Cross of the Order of Polonia Restituta in December 2000.

=== Death and tributes ===
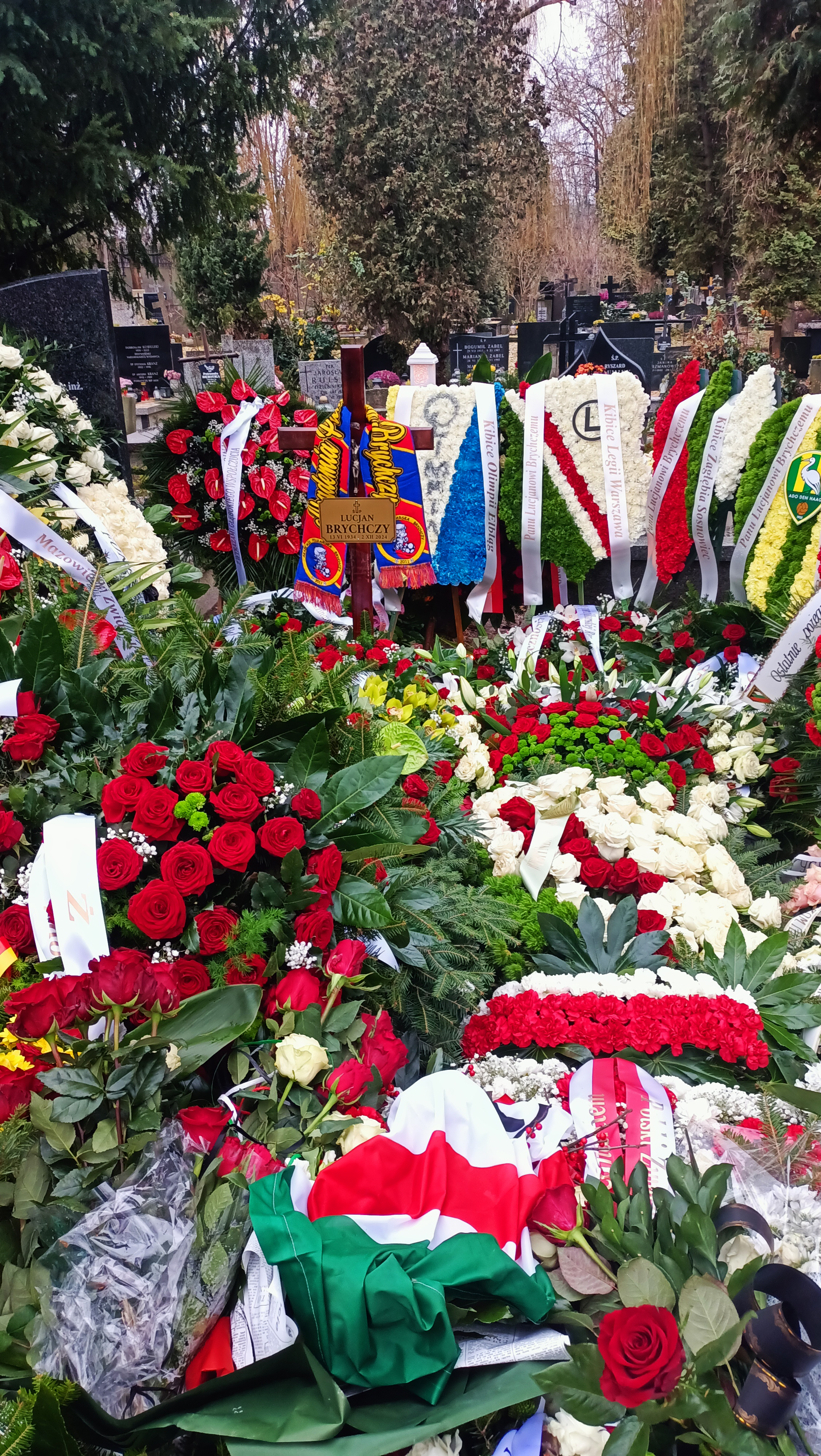
Grave of Lucjan Brychczy at Powązki Military Cemetery in Warsaw

Brychczy died in Warsaw on 2 December 2024, at the age of 90.

Following his death, the Polish Football Association announced that all matches of the I liga and the Polish Cup, scheduled between 2 and 9 December 2024, would be preceded by a moment of silence to honor his memory. Additionally, on 4 December, the Polish Sejm paid tribute to Lucjan Brychczy with a moment of silence during a parliamentary session.

Before the first Legia match after Brychczy's death, on 5 December, during a Polish Cup game against ŁKS Łódź at the Władysław Król Stadium, Legia Warsaw players took to the pitch wearing special shirts featuring Lucjan Brychczy's image and the inscription ŻEGNAJ, LEGENDO! ("Farewell, Legend!").

Immediately after his death, a debate started regarding the possibility of renaming the Polish Army Stadium in his honor.

== Career statistics ==
=== Club ===
Appearances and goals by club, season and competition
Club	Season	League			National cup		Continental		Total	
Club	Season	Division	Apps	Goals	Apps	Goals	Apps	Goals	Apps	Goals
Piast Gliwice	1954	III Liga, gr. 1					—			
Legia Warsaw	1954	Ekstraklasa	10	3	0	0	—		10	3
Legia Warsaw	1955	Ekstraklasa	22	13	4	1	—		26	14
Legia Warsaw	1956	Ekstraklasa	19	16	5	8	2 (Note: Appearance(s) in European Cup)	1	26	25
Legia Warsaw	1957	Ekstraklasa	18	19	2	3	—		20	22
Legia Warsaw	1958	Ekstraklasa	16	15	0	0	—		16	15
Legia Warsaw	1959	Ekstraklasa	18	9	0	0	—		18	9
Legia Warsaw	1960	Ekstraklasa	22	13	0	0	2	0	24	13
Legia Warsaw	1961	Ekstraklasa	25	12	0	0	—		25	12
Legia Warsaw	1962	Ekstraklasa	13	9	2	0	—		15	9
Legia Warsaw	1962–63	Ekstraklasa	19	5	2	2	—		21	7
Legia Warsaw	1963–64	Ekstraklasa	24	18	5	6	—		29	24
Legia Warsaw	1964–65	Ekstraklasa	25	20	4	5	7 (Note: Appearance(s) in Cup Winners' Cup)	2	36	27
Legia Warsaw	1965–66	Ekstraklasa	25	8	5	4	—		30	12
Legia Warsaw	1966–67	Ekstraklasa	24	6	2	1	2	0	28	7
Legia Warsaw	1967–68	Ekstraklasa	26	8	2	3	6 (Note: Appearance(s) in Intertoto Cup)	0	34	11
Legia Warsaw	1968–69	Ekstraklasa	25	6	7	3	6	1	38	10
Legia Warsaw	1969–70	Ekstraklasa	22	0	4	0	8	4	34	4
Legia Warsaw	1970–71	Ekstraklasa	5	0	0	0	—		5	0
Legia Warsaw	1971–72	Ekstraklasa	10	2	3	0	4	0	17	2
Career total			368	182	47	36	37	8	452	226

=== International ===
Appearances and goals by national team and year
National team	Year	Apps	Goals
Poland	1954	2	0
Poland	1955	3	1
Poland	1956	6	1
Poland	1957	5	3
Poland	1958	2	0
Poland	1959	3	1
Poland	1960	7	1
Poland	1961	6	1
Poland	1962	8	3
Poland	1963	6	4
Poland	1964	4	0
Poland	1965	1	0
Poland	1966	0	0
Poland	1967	3	2
Poland	1968	0	0
Poland	1969	2	1
Total		58	18

== Honours ==
=== Player ===
Legia Warsaw

- Ekstraklasa: 1955, 1956, 1968–69, 1969–70
- Polish Cup: 1954–55, 1955–56, 1963–64, 1965–66

Individual

- Ekstraklasa top scorer: 1957, 1963–64, 1964–65

=== Manager ===
Legia Warsaw

- Polish Cup: 1971–72, 1979–80, 1989–90

=== Orders ===
- Officer's Cross of the Order of Polonia Restituta: 2000

== See also ==
- List of one-club men in association football

== Bibliography ==
- Dawidziuk, Adam (2024). "Na zawsze z Legią". Nasza Legia. 4.
