= 1964–65 Ekstraklasa =

39th season of top-tier football league in Poland

Liga
- Season: 1964–65
- Champions: Górnik Zabrze (6th title)
- Relegated: Pogoń Szczecin; Unia Racibórz
- Top goalscorer: Lucjan Brychczy (20 goals)

Statistics of Ekstraklasa for the 1964–65 season.

== Overview ==
14 teams played in the league and the championship went to Górnik Zabrze.

== League table ==
Pos	Team	Pld	W	D	L	GF	GA	GD	Pts	Qualification or relegation
1	Górnik Zabrze (C)	26	15	7	4	61	35	+26	37	Qualification to European Cup preliminary round
2	Szombierki Bytom	26	14	4	8	53	44	+9	32	
3	Zagłębie Sosnowiec	26	14	3	9	57	36	+21	31	
4	Legia Warsaw	26	12	6	8	56	31	+25	30	
5	Polonia Bytom	26	11	4	11	48	38	+10	26	
6	Gwardia Warsaw	26	9	8	9	31	30	+1	26	
7	Ruch Chorzów	26	9	8	9	41	41	0	26	
8	Zawisza Bydgoszcz	26	9	6	11	34	41	−7	24	
9	ŁKS Łódź	26	8	8	10	25	32	−7	24	
10	Odra Opole	26	8	8	10	26	35	−9	24	
11	Śląsk Wrocław	26	9	6	11	35	46	−11	24	
12	Stal Rzeszów	26	5	13	8	30	35	−5	23	
13	Pogoń Szczecin (R)	26	9	5	12	31	41	−10	23	Relegated to II liga
14	Unia Racibórz (R)	26	6	2	18	32	75	−43	14	Relegated to II liga

Source: 90minut.pl (in Polish)
(C) Champions; (R) Relegated

== Results ==
Home \ Away	GÓR	GWA	LEG	ŁKS	OOP	POG	BYT	RUC	SRZ	SZB	ŚLĄ	UNI	ZSO	ZAW
Górnik Zabrze		4–2	3–0	0–0	2–1	1–1	2–1	1–1	2–0	2–3	6–3	4–0	2–2	3–1
Gwardia Warsaw	0–2		1–1	1–0	1–1	1–0	5–0	1–1	0–0	0–1	0–0	4–2	3–0	2–1
Legia Warsaw	5–2	0–1		3–0	0–2	4–0	1–0	2–2	2–2	2–0	5–0	5–0	3–1	7–2
ŁKS Łódź	2–6	2–0	0–0		0–0	1–0	2–0	1–1	0–0	0–0	1–0	2–3	1–0	2–0
Odra Opole	0–1	0–0	1–0	2–1		0–0	3–0	1–0	3–0	2–3	0–0	1–1	2–1	2–1
Pogoń Szczecin	1–3	4–0	1–3	1–2	3–1		1–0	3–1	0–0	2–2	3–1	4–2	2–1	0–2
Polonia Bytom	1–0	1–1	1–0	4–3	7–0	0–1		8–0	2–2	0–0	2–1	9–2	1–2	0–0
Ruch Chorzów	1–2	1–1	2–1	0–1	1–1	1–0	2–0		1–1	7–1	1–2	1–2	4–2	2–0
Stal Rzeszów	2–2	0–1	0–0	1–1	1–1	1–0	3–4	2–0		3–2	1–1	5–0	0–0	1–1
Szombierki Bytom	1–2	3–2	5–4	4–1	3–0	4–0	2–0	2–2	4–0		3–0	2–1	0–5	2–0
Śląsk Wrocław	3–3	2–1	1–4	2–1	1–0	3–0	0–2	0–1	4–2	1–4		3–1	3–1	3–1
Unia Racibórz	0–4	1–0	0–2	1–1	2–1	1–2	0–2	1–3	1–3	3–2	2–0		2–5	2–3
Zagłębie Sosnowiec	3–1	3–1	3–1	1–0	5–1	4–0	5–2	2–3	1–0	4–0	0–0	2–1		3–0
Zawisza Bydgoszcz	1–1	0–2	1–1	2–0	1–0	2–2	0–1	3–2	2–0	1–0	1–1	5–1	3–1	

Source: 90minut.pl (in Polish)
Legend: Blue = home team win; Yellow = draw; Red = away team win.

== Top goalscorers ==
Rank	Player	Club	Goals
1	(Poland) Lucjan Brychczy	Legia Warsaw	20
2	(Poland) Andrzej Jarosik	Zagłębie Sosnowiec	16
2	(Poland) Ernest Pol	Górnik Zabrze	16
4	(Poland) Józef Gałeczka	Zagłębie Sosnowiec	14
5	(Poland) Ginter Lazar	Unia Racibórz	13
6	(Poland) Henryk Apostel	Legia Warsaw	12
6	(Poland) Eugeniusz Faber	Ruch Chorzów	12
6	(Poland) Jan Liberda	Polonia Bytom	12
6	(Poland) Norbert Pogrzeba	Polonia Bytom	12
6	(Poland) Manfred Urbas	Unia Racibórz	12

== Attendances ==
#	Club	Average
1	Śląsk Wrocław	23,923
2	Pogoń Szczecin	17,615
3	Zagłębie Sosnowiec	15,538
4	ŁKS	13,154
5	Ruch Chorzów	12,923
6	Górnik Zabrze	11,692
7	Stal Rzeszów	11,000
8	Zawisza Bydgoszcz	9,000
9	Szombierki Bytom	8,269
10	Legia Warszawa	8,231
11	Polonia Bytom	8,154
12	Odra Opole	7,346
13	Unia Racibórz	6,923
14	Gwardia Warszawa	5,646
