= 1962 Ekstraklasa =

36th season of top-tier football league in Poland

Liga
- Season: 1962
- Champions: Polonia Bytom (2nd title)
- European Cup: Polonia Bytom
- Top goalscorer: Jan Liberda (16 goals)

Statistics of Ekstraklasa for the 1962 season.

== Overview ==
It was contested by 14 teams, and Polonia Bytom won the championship.

== Regular season ==
=== Group A ===
Pos	Team	Pld	W	D	L	GF	GA	GD	Pts	Qualification or relegation
1	Górnik Zabrze	12	8	2	2	37	14	+23	18	Qualification to 1st place playoff
2	Zagłębie Sosnowiec	12	7	1	4	22	15	+7	15	
3	Legia Warsaw	12	5	4	3	15	13	+2	14	
4	Ruch Chorzów	12	5	3	4	21	19	+2	13	
5	ŁKS Łódź	12	3	3	6	14	23	−9	9	
6	Gwardia Warsaw	12	2	4	6	12	20	−8	8	
7	KS Cracovia (R)	12	2	3	7	11	28	−17	7	Relegated to II liga

Source: 90minut.pl (in Polish)
(R) Relegated

==== Results ====
Home \ Away	CRA	GÓR	GWA	LEG	ŁKS	RUC	ZSO
Cracovia		1–4	0–0	0–2	0–0	1–1	0–3
Górnik Zabrze	9–0		3–1	4–1	4–2	3–1	5–2
Gwardia Warsaw	0–4	0–0		1–1	1–0	5–1	0–1
Legia Warsaw	3–2	0–0	1–0		4–2	0–0	1–0
ŁKS Łódź	0–2	3–2	1–1	1–0		0–3	3–3
Ruch Chorzów	3–1	3–1	3–2	2–2	3–0		0–1
Zagłębie Sosnowiec	3–0	0–2	5–1	1–0	0–2	3–1	

Source: 90minut.pl (in Polish)
Legend: Blue = home team win; Yellow = draw; Red = away team win.

=== Group B ===
Pos	Team	Pld	W	D	L	GF	GA	GD	Pts	Qualification or relegation
1	Polonia Bytom	12	8	3	1	28	7	+21	19	Qualification to 1st place playoff
2	Odra Opole	12	6	2	4	17	11	+6	14	
3	Wisła Kraków	12	5	4	3	9	7	+2	14	
4	Arkonia Szczecin	12	4	3	5	18	20	−2	11	
5	Lechia Gdańsk	12	4	3	5	11	18	−7	11	
6	Lech Poznań	12	3	3	6	6	14	−8	9	
7	Stal Mielec (R)	12	1	4	7	9	21	−12	6	Relegated to II liga

Source: 90minut.pl (in Polish)
(R) Relegated

==== Results ====
Home \ Away	AKN	LPO	LGD	OOP	BYT	STA	WIS
Arkonia Szczecin		2–0	3–1	0–1	1–4	7–1	0–2
Lech Poznań	1–1		0–1	0–3	0–0	1–0	0–1
Lechia Gdańsk	5–0	0–2		1–0	0–0	0–0	2–1
Odra Opole	2–0	1–0	6–0		1–3	1–0	1–1
Polonia Bytom	2–2	5–1	4–0	2–0		4–1	2–0
Stal Mielec	1–1	0–1	1–1	4–1	0–2		0–1
Wisła Kraków	0–1	0–0	1–0	0–0	1–0	1–1	

Source: 90minut.pl (in Polish)
Legend: Blue = home team win; Yellow = draw; Red = away team win.

== Playoff stage ==
=== 1st place playoff ===
- Górnik Zabrze 1-4; 2-2 Polonia Bytom

=== 3rd place playoff ===
- Odra Opole 1-0; 0-1 Zagłębie Sosnowiec

=== 5th place playoff ===
- Wisła Kraków 1-1; 1-4 Legia Warsaw

=== 7th place playoff ===
- Arkonia Szczecin 2-0; 1-2 Ruch Chorzów

=== 9th place playoff ===
- Lechia Gdańsk 2-0; 1-3 ŁKS Łódź

=== 11th place playoff ===
- Gwardia Warszawa 2-6; 1-2 Lech Poznań

=== 13th place playoff ===
- Stal Mielec 3-0; 1-0 KS Cracovia

== Top goalscorers ==
Rank	Player	Club	Goals
1	(Poland) Jan Liberda	Polonia Bytom	16
2	(Poland) Ernest Pol	Górnik Zabrze	12
3	(Poland) Zygfryd Szołtysik	Górnik Zabrze	11
4	(Poland) Lucjan Brychczy	Legia Warsaw	9
5	(Poland) Eugeniusz Lerch	Ruch Chorzów	8
6	(Poland) Jerzy Jóźwiak	Polonia Bytom	7
7	(Poland) Norbert Gajda	Odra Opole	6
7	(Poland) Janusz Gogolewski	Lech Poznań	6
7	(Poland) Kazimierz Kowalec	ŁKS Łódź	6

== Attendances ==
#	Club	Average
1	Górnik Zabrze	26,000
2	Ruch Chorzów	23,333
3	Cracovia	21,167
4	Zagłębie Sosnowiec	20,833
5	Wisła Kraków	16,667
6	Lech Poznań	16,167
7	ŁKS	15,333
8	Lechia Gdańsk	13,333
9	Gwardia Warszawa	12,667
10	Polonia Bytom	12,143
11	Arkonia Szczecin	11,833
12	Legia Warszawa	11,167
13	Odra Opole	8,000
14	Stal Mielec	7,500
