= 1968–69 Ekstraklasa =

43rd season of top-tier football league in Poland

Liga
- Season: 1968–69
- Champions: Legia Warsaw (3rd title)
- Relegated: Śląsk Wrocław; ROW Rybnik
- Top goalscorer: Włodzimierz Lubański (22 goals)

Statistics of Ekstraklasa for the 1968–69 season.

== Overview ==
It was contested by 14 teams, and Legia Warsaw won the championship.

== League table ==
Pos	Team	Pld	W	D	L	GF	GA	GD	Pts	Qualification or relegation
1	Legia Warsaw (C)	26	16	7	3	51	16	+35	39	Qualification to European Cup first round
2	Górnik Zabrze	26	15	7	4	49	21	+28	37	Qualification to Cup Winners' Cup first round
3	Polonia Bytom	29	8	12	9	30	23	+7	28	
4	Szombierki Bytom	26	11	6	9	35	35	0	28	
5	Zagłębie Sosnowiec	26	12	4	10	32	33	−1	28	
6	Ruch Chorzów	26	9	9	8	34	34	0	27	Invitation for Inter-Cities Fairs Cup first round
7	Wisła Kraków	26	9	7	10	25	32	−7	25	
8	GKS Katowice	26	6	12	8	21	21	0	24	
9	Odra Opole	26	8	8	10	28	33	−5	24	
10	Zagłębie Wałbrzych	26	10	3	13	21	29	−8	23	
11	Pogoń Szczecin	26	7	8	11	24	31	−7	22	
12	Stal Rzeszów	26	7	8	11	18	31	−13	22	
13	Śląsk Wrocław (R)	26	7	7	12	19	30	−11	21	Relegated to II liga
14	ROW Rybnik (R)	26	3	10	13	23	41	−18	16	Relegated to II liga

Source: 90minut.pl (in Polish)
(C) Champions; (R) Relegated

== Results ==
Home \ Away	KAT	GÓR	LEG	OOP	POG	BYT	RYB	RUC	SRZ	SZB	ŚLĄ	WIS	ZSO	ZWA
GKS Katowice		3–0 (Note: The match between GKS Katowice and Górnik Zabrze (originally finished 2–1) was interrupted in 81 mins and verified to wo.)	1–1	2–1	0–2	1–0	0–0	1–1	0–0	0–1	0–0	1–1	2–0	3–0
Górnik Zabrze	2–0		2–0	4–1	4–0	4–0	3–2	2–0	0–0	4–2	4–0	3–1	4–2	0–0
Legia Warsaw	2–2	1–2		3–0	6–0	1–0	1–0	6–2	4–0	3–0	1–0	3–0	3–0	1–0
Odra Opole	3–2	0–0	1–1		0–1	0–0	0–1	1–3	4–1	2–0	3–1	1–0	4–1	1–0
Pogoń Szczecin	0–0	0–1	0–1	5–0		2–2	3–1	0–0	0–0	3–1	1–0	2–0	0–1	0–0
Polonia Bytom	0–0	1–1	1–2	1–1	3–0		1–1	4–2	1–1	0–0	0–0	3–0	1–0	3–2
ROW Rybnik	1–1	0–0	1–1	2–2	1–0	0–2		1–1	0–1	1–2	2–3	0–0	2–2	1–1
Ruch Chorzów	0–1	0–3	0–0	2–1	0–0	0–0	3–4		2–0	0–0	2–2	4–1	3–1	1–0
Stal Rzeszów	2–0	0–0	0–1	0–0	2–0	0–3	4–0	1–1		1–0	0–0	0–4	0–1	2–1
Szombierki Bytom	2–1	1–2	2–1	1–1	1–0	2–2	2–0	1–3	4–1		1–0	3–3	3–2	2–0
Śląsk Wrocław	1–0	2–1	0–4	0–1	1–1	0–0	2–0	0–2	2–1	0–0		2–3	1–0	0–1
Wisła Kraków	0–0	1–1	1–1	1–0	2–2	1–0	1–0	1–0	1–0	1–2	0–2		1–0	1–0
Zagłębie Sosnowiec	0–0	3–2	0–0	0–0	1–0	1–2	2–0	3–1	2–0	3–2	1–0	1–0		1–0
Zagłębie Wałbrzych	1–0	1–0	1–3	1–0	3–2	1–0	3–2	0–1	0–1	1–0	1–0	1–0	2–4	

Source: 90minut.pl (in Polish)
Legend: Blue = home team win; Yellow = draw; Red = away team win.

== Top goalscorers ==
Rank	Player	Club	Goals
1	(Poland) Włodzimierz Lubański	Górnik Zabrze	22
2	(Poland) Jan Banaś	Polonia Bytom	14
3	(Poland) Kazimierz Deyna	Legia Warsaw	12
4	(Poland) Jerzy Wilim	Szombierki Bytom	10
5	(Poland) Robert Gadocha	Legia Warsaw	9
5	(Poland) Józef Gałeczka	Zagłębie Sosnowiec	9
5	(Poland) Jan Wilim	Szombierki Bytom	9
8	(Poland) Eugeniusz Lerch	ROW Rybnik	8
8	(Poland) Janusz Żmijewski	Legia Warsaw	8
10	(Poland) Eugeniusz Faber	Ruch Chorzów	7
10	(Poland) Jan Pieszko	Legia Warsaw	7
10	(Poland) Zygmunt Schmidt	GKS Katowice	7
10	(Poland) Erwin Wilczek	Górnik Zabrze	7

== Attendances ==
No.	Club	Average Attendance
1	Ruch Chorzów	16,538
2	Pogoń Szczecin	14,846
3	Legia Warszawa	13,308
4	Górnik Zabrze	13,231
5	Zagłębie Sosnowiec	13,077
6	Szombierki Bytom	12,192
7	Wisła Kraków	12,154
8	Stal Rzeszów	12,000
9	Polonia Bytom	11,923
10	Zagłębie Wałbrzych	11,692
11	Katowice	11,369
12	ROW	10,769
13	Śląsk Wrocław	9,462
14	Odra Opole	7,615
