= 1969–70 Ekstraklasa =

44th season of top-tier football league in Poland

I liga
- Season: 1969–70
- Dates: 9 August 1969 – 21 June 1970
- Champions: Legia Warsaw (4th title)
- Relegated: Odra Opole; Cracovia
- European Cup: Legia Warsaw
- Cup Winners' Cup: Górnik Zabrze
- Inter-Cities Fairs Cup: Ruch Chorzów; GKS Katowice
- Matches: 182
- Goals: 382 (2.1 per match)
- Top goalscorer: Andrzej Jarosik (18 goals)
- Biggest home win: Zagłębie S. 6–1 Pogoń; Stal 6–1 Odra; Ruch 5–0 Wisła
- Biggest away win: Zagłębie W. 0–4 GKS; Odra 0–4 Legia
- Highest scoring: Szombierki 3–5 Zagłębie S.
- Highest attendance: 40,000; Ruch 1–1 Górnik (11 March 1970)
- Total attendance: 1,854,944
- Average attendance: 10,192

The 1969–70 I liga was the 44th season of the Polish Football Championship and the 36th season of the I liga, the top Polish professional league for association football clubs, since its establishment in 1927. The league was operated by the Polish Football Association (PZPN).

The defending champions were Legia Warsaw, who won their 4th Polish title.

== Competition modus ==
The season started on 9 August 1969 and concluded on 21 June 1970 (autumn-spring league). The season was played as a round-robin tournament. The team at the top of the standings won the league title. A total of 14 teams participated, 12 of which competed in the league during the 1968–69 season, while the remaining two were promoted from the 1968–69 II liga. Each team played a total of 26 matches, half at home and half away, two games against each other team. Teams received two points for a win and one point for a draw.

== League table ==
| Pos | Team | Pld | W | D | L | GF | GA | GD | Pts | Qualification or relegation |
|---|---|---|---|---|---|---|---|---|---|---|
| 1 | Legia Warsaw (C) | 26 | 17 | 6 | 3 | 43 | 17 | +26 | 40 | Qualification to European Cup first round |
| 2 | Ruch Chorzów | 26 | 12 | 11 | 3 | 42 | 20 | +22 | 35 | Invitation for Inter-Cities Fairs Cup first round |
| 3 | Górnik Zabrze | 26 | 13 | 9 | 4 | 35 | 20 | +15 | 35 | Qualification to Cup Winners' Cup first round |
| 4 | Polonia Bytom | 26 | 11 | 9 | 6 | 27 | 22 | +5 | 31 | |
| 5 | Zagłębie Sosnowiec | 26 | 11 | 5 | 10 | 36 | 32 | +4 | 27 | |
| 6 | Gwardia Warsaw | 26 | 9 | 8 | 9 | 26 | 23 | +3 | 26 | |
| 7 | GKS Katowice | 26 | 8 | 10 | 8 | 19 | 18 | +1 | 26 | Invitation for Inter-Cities Fairs Cup first round |
| 8 | Wisła Kraków | 26 | 7 | 10 | 9 | 20 | 28 | −8 | 24 | |
| 9 | Stal Rzeszów | 26 | 9 | 5 | 12 | 30 | 36 | −6 | 23 | |
| 10 | Szombierki Bytom | 26 | 7 | 8 | 11 | 25 | 33 | −8 | 22 | |
| 11 | Zagłębie Wałbrzych | 26 | 6 | 10 | 10 | 20 | 28 | −8 | 22 | |
| 12 | Pogoń Szczecin | 26 | 6 | 9 | 11 | 21 | 31 | −10 | 21 | |
| 13 | Odra Opole (R) | 26 | 6 | 9 | 11 | 22 | 36 | −14 | 21 | Relegated to II liga |
| 14 | Cracovia (R) | 26 | 2 | 7 | 17 | 16 | 38 | −22 | 11 | Relegated to II liga |

Source: 90minut.pl (in Polish)
(C) Champions; (R) Relegated

== Results ==
| Home \ Away | CRA | KAT | GÓR | GWA | LEG | OOP | POG | BYT | RUC | SRZ | SZB | WIS | ZSO | ZWA |
|---|---|---|---|---|---|---|---|---|---|---|---|---|---|---|
| Cracovia | | 1–2 | 1–1 | 0–0 | 0–2 | 0–0 | 1–2 | 0–1 | 2–4 | 0–3 | 1–1 | 2–3 | 0–1 | 2–1 |
| GKS Katowice | 1–0 | | 1–0 | 1–0 | 0–0 | 0–0 | 3–0 | 1–2 | 0–0 | 1–0 | 2–0 | 0–0 | 0–1 | 0–0 |
| Górnik Zabrze | 2–0 | 4–1 | | 0–0 | 1–2 | 1–0 | 2–0 | 2–1 | 1–1 | 2–0 | 1–1 | 1–0 | 3–0 | 1–0 |
| Gwardia Warsaw | 2–2 | 0–0 | 2–3 | | 4–1 | 4–1 | 1–0 | 0–0 | 0–2 | 0–1 | 2–0 | 2–1 | 0–2 | 0–0 |
| Legia Warsaw | 2–0 | 2–0 | 2–1 | 3–1 | | 1–0 | 2–0 | 0–0 | 3–0 | 2–0 | 1–0 | 3–0 | 2–1 | 3–1 |
| Odra Opole | 2–1 | 0–0 | 4–0 | 0–0 | 0–4 | | 0–0 | 1–1 | 0–3 | 4–0 | 3–1 | 1–0 | 0–2 | 0–0 |
| Pogoń Szczecin | 0–2 | 0–0 | 0–0 | 0–2 | 0–1 | 2–0 | | 4–1 | 0–0 | 0–0 | 4–0 | 2–0 | 0–2 | 1–1 |
| Polonia Bytom | 1–0 | 0–0 | 0–0 | 0–1 | 3–2 | 0–0 | 1–1 | | 1–1 | 4–0 | 2–1 | 2–1 | 3–0 | 0–1 |
| Ruch Chorzów | 1–1 | 3–0 | 1–1 | 1–0 | 1–1 | 2–1 | 2–0 | 3–0 | | 2–1 | 1–0 | 5–0 | 3–0 | 1–1 |
| Stal Rzeszów | 1–0 | 2–1 | 2–4 | 2–0 | 2–1 | 6–1 | 1–2 | 0–0 | 1–1 | | 0–0 | 2–3 | 2–0 | 0–1 |
| Szombierki Bytom | 1–0 | 0–0 | 0–2 | 0–0 | 3–2 | 3–0 | 2–1 | 0–1 | 2–1 | 5–2 | | 2–0 | 3–5 | 1–0 |
| Wisła Kraków | 2–0 | 1–0 | 0–0 | 1–0 | 0–0 | 2–0 | 1–1 | 0–1 | 1–1 | 0–0 | 0–0 | | 1–0 | 1–1 |
| Zagłębie Sosnowiec | 0–0 | 2–1 | 1–2 | 0–2 | 0–0 | 2–2 | 6–1 | 3–0 | 2–1 | 1–2 | 0–0 | 1–1 | | 4–1 |
| Zagłębie Wałbrzych | 2–0 | 0–4 | 0–0 | 2–3 | 0–1 | 1–2 | 0–0 | 0–2 | 1–1 | 1–0 | 2–0 | 1–1 | 2–0 | |

Source: 90minut.pl (in Polish)
Legend: Blue = home team win; Yellow = draw; Red = away team win.

== Top goalscorers ==
| Rank | Player | Club | Goals |
|---|---|---|---|
| 1 | (Poland) Andrzej Jarosik | Zagłębie Sosnowiec | 18 |
| 2 | (Poland) Robert Gadocha | Legia Warsaw | 12 |
| 2 | (Poland) Włodzimierz Lubański | Górnik Zabrze | 12 |
| 2 | (Poland) Jan Pieszko | Legia Warsaw | 12 |
| 5 | (Poland) Ryszard Szymczak | Gwardia Warsaw | 11 |
| 6 | (Poland) Jerzy Wilim | Szombierki Bytom | 10 |
| 6 | (Poland) Jan Domarski | Stal Rzeszów | 10 |
| 6 | (Poland) Edward Herman | Ruch Chorzów | 10 |
| 9 | (Poland) Bronisław Bula | Ruch Chorzów | 9 |
| 10 | (Poland) Joachim Marx | Ruch Chorzów | 8 |
| 10 | (Poland) Eugeniusz Faber | Ruch Chorzów | 8 |

== Attendances ==
| # | Club | Average |
|---|---|---|
| 1 | Górnik Zabrze | 15,077 |
| 2 | Ruch Chorzów | 14,615 |
| 3 | Pogoń Szczecin | 14,154 |
| 4 | Zagłębie Sosnowiec | 13,538 |
| 5 | Cracovia | 13,077 |
| 6 | Wisła Kraków | 12,846 |
| 7 | Stal Rzeszów | 12,615 |
| 8 | Legia Warszawa | 10,231 |
| 9 | Zagłębie Wałbrzych | 8,769 |
| 10 | Polonia Bytom | 8,538 |
| 11 | Szombierki Bytom | 5,462 |
| 12 | Gwardia Warszawa | 4,846 |
| 13 | Katowice | 4,577 |
| 14 | Odra Opole | 4,346 |

== Bibliography ==
- Gowarzewski, Andrzej (2000). Encyklopedia Piłkarska Fuji. Liga Polska. O tytuł mistrza Polski 1920–2000 (in Polish). GiA, Katowice. ISBN 83-88232-02-9.
