= Karol Dziwisz =

Polish footballer (1911–1982)

Personal information
- Date of birth: 14 June 1911
- Place of birth: Bismarckhütte, Germany
- Date of death: 22 October 1982 (aged 71)
- Place of death: Katowice, Poland
- Height: 1.62 m (5 ft 4 in)
- Position: Midfielder

Senior career*
Years	Team	Apps	(Gls)
1925–1939	Ruch Chorzów		
1939–1944	BSV Bismarckhütte		
1945–1946	Ruch Chorzów		
1947	Piast Gliwice		

International career
1933–1934	Poland	2	(0)

Managerial career
- 1947–1948: Piast Gliwice
- * Club domestic league appearances and goals

Karol Dziwisz (14 June 1911 – 22 October 1982) was a Polish footballer who played as a midfielder. He made two appearances for the Poland football team from 1933 to 1934.

== Honours ==
Ruch Chorzów

- Ekstraklasa: 1933, 1934, 1935, 1936, 1938
