= 1959 Ekstraklasa =

33rd season of top-tier football league in Poland

Liga
- Season: 1959
- Champions: Górnik Zabrze (2nd title)
- Relegated: KS Cracovia; Górnik Radlin
- Top goalscorer: Ernst Pohl; Jan Liberda (21 goals)

Statistics of Ekstraklasa for the 1959 season.

== Overview ==
It was contested by 12 teams, and Górnik Zabrze won the championship.

== League table ==
Pos	Team	Pld	W	D	L	GF	GA	GD	Pts	Qualification or relegation
1	Górnik Zabrze (C)	22	16	4	2	55	23	+32	36	
2	Polonia Bytom	22	12	6	4	52	27	+25	30	
3	Gwardia Warsaw	22	10	5	7	36	26	+10	25	
4	Legia Warsaw	22	8	9	5	31	29	+2	25	
5	Ruch Chorzów	22	8	8	6	32	30	+2	24	
6	Lechia Gdańsk	22	8	5	9	19	24	−5	21	
7	Wisła Kraków	22	8	4	10	35	34	+1	20	
8	ŁKS Łódź	22	6	8	8	35	35	0	20	Qualification for the European Cup preliminary round
9	Polonia Bydgoszcz	22	6	8	8	33	42	−9	20	
10	Pogoń Szczecin	22	6	6	10	28	40	−12	18	
11	KS Cracovia (R)	22	6	5	11	29	42	−13	17	Relegated to II liga
12	Górnik Radlin (R)	22	2	4	16	15	48	−33	8	Relegated to II liga

Source: 90minut.pl (in Polish)
(C) Champions; (R) Relegated

== Results ==
Home \ Away	CRA	GRA	GÓR	GWA	LGD	LEG	ŁKS	POG	BYG	BYT	RUC	WIS
Cracovia		2–1	0–1	0–1	0–0	1–2	2–2	3–5	3–1	1–2	5–1	0–1
Górnik Radlin	0–0		2–1	1–0	1–2	0–1	1–2	1–2	0–1	1–6	0–1	1–3
Górnik Zabrze	3–0	6–0		2–1	3–2	1–0	2–1	3–1	6–2	2–0	2–2	4–0
Gwardia Warsaw	6–1	4–2	2–3		1–0	3–1	2–1	4–0	0–0	2–3	2–1	1–1
Lechia Gdańsk	0–3	1–0	1–0	1–0		0–0	1–0	4–1	3–2	2–2	1–3	1–0
Legia Warsaw	1–1	3–2	1–2	0–0	1–0		5–3	0–4	2–2	2–2	3–1	1–3
ŁKS Łódź	0–2	1–1	2–2	3–0	3–0	0–0		3–3	2–0	0–0	3–0	2–0
Pogoń Szczecin	0–0	1–0	1–3	0–1	1–0	1–2	1–1		3–0	1–1	1–1	0–3
Polonia Bydgoszcz	6–0	3–0	2–2	1–1	1–0	1–1	2–2	2–2		1–3	3–1	1–0
Polonia Bytom	4–2	7–0	0–2	2–2	0–0	0–3	4–2	3–0	5–0		0–4	4–0
Ruch Chorzów	3–0	0–0	2–2	2–1	0–0	0–0	3–1	1–0	2–2	0–1		2–1
Wisła Kraków	2–3	1–1	1–3	1–2	2–0	2–2	4–1	4–0	4–0	0–3	2–2	

Source: 90minut.pl (in Polish)
Legend: Blue = home team win; Yellow = draw; Red = away team win.

== Top goalscorers ==
Rank	Player	Club	Goals
1	(Poland) Jan Liberda	Polonia Bytom	21
1	(Poland) Ernest Pol	Górnik Zabrze	21
3	(Poland) Marian Norkowski	Polonia Bydgoszcz	16
4	(Poland) Władysław Soporek	ŁKS Łódź	11
5	(Poland) Lucjan Brychczy	Legia Warsaw	9
5	(Poland) Henryk Kalinowski	Pogoń Szczecin	9
5	(Poland) Henryk Kempny	Polonia Bytom	9
5	(Poland) Marian Kielec	Pogoń Szczecin	9
5	(Poland) Norbert Pogrzeba	Polonia Bytom	9

== Attendances ==
#	Football club	Home games	Average attendance
1	Pogoń Szczecin	11	24,182
2	ŁKS	11	22,273
3	KS Cracovia	11	21,273
4	Ruch Chorzów	11	20,727
5	Lechia Gdańsk	11	19,636
6	Wisła Kraków	11	19,455
7	Polonia Bytom	11	18,000
8	Legia Warszawa	11	17,727
9	Górnik Zabrze	11	17,000
10	Polonia Bydgoszcz	11	16,273
11	Gwardia Warszawa	11	9,182
12	Górnik Radlin	11	6,636
