= Władysław Gzel =

Polish footballer

Personal information
- Date of birth: 29 August 1942
- Place of birth: Świętochłowice, Poland
- Date of death: 24 September 2019 (aged 77)
- Place of death: Essen, Germany
- Position: Forward

Senior career*
Years	Team	Apps	(Gls)
1956–1960	Zryw Chorzów		
1960–1962	Naprzód Lipiny		
1962–1965	Arkonia Szczecin		
1965–1972	Zagłębie Sosnowiec		
1972–1975	AKS Niwka		
- LKS Stara Wieś

International career
1962–1964	Poland	2	(0)
- * Club domestic league appearances and goals

Władysław Gzel (29 August 1942 – 24 September 2019) was a Polish footballer who played as a forward.

He played in two matches for the Poland national team from 1962 to 1964.
