= 1957 Ekstraklasa =

31st season of top-tier football league in Poland

Liga
- Season: 1957
- Champions: Górnik Zabrze (1st title)
- Relegated: Górnik Radlin; Lech Poznań
- Top goalscorer: Lucjan Brychczy (19 goals)

Statistics of Ekstraklasa for the 1957 season.

== Overview ==
12 teams competed in the 1957 Ekstraklasa. Górnik Zabrze won the championship.

== League table ==
Pos	Team	Pld	W	D	L	GF	GA	GD	Pts	Qualification or relegation
1	Górnik Zabrze (C)	22	15	3	4	58	24	+34	33	
2	Gwardia Warsaw	22	15	2	5	53	26	+27	32	Qualification for the European Cup preliminary round
3	ŁKS Łódź	22	12	5	5	53	28	+25	29	
4	Legia Warsaw	22	11	4	7	62	33	+29	26	
5	Lechia Gdańsk	22	8	6	8	25	29	−4	22	
6	Polonia Bytom	22	7	7	8	30	31	−1	21	
7	Zagłębie Sosnowiec	22	5	10	7	38	45	−7	20	
8	Ruch Chorzów	22	7	5	10	35	46	−11	19	
9	Wisła Kraków	22	6	6	10	35	44	−9	18	
10	Odra Opole	22	8	2	12	27	48	−21	18	
11	Górnik Radlin (R)	22	4	6	12	23	54	−31	14	Relegated to II liga
12	Lech Poznań (R)	22	5	2	15	25	46	−21	12	Relegated to II liga

Source: 90minut.pl (in Polish)
(C) Champions; (R) Relegated

== Results ==
Home \ Away	GRA	GÓR	GWA	LPO	LGD	LEG	ŁKS	OOP	BYT	RUC	WIS	ZSO
Górnik Radlin		1–5	0–1	2–0	1–1	0–7	2–1	2–3	0–0	1–1	4–0	2–0
Górnik Zabrze	6–0		3–1	4–1	2–0	3–2	1–5	8–1	3–1	2–1	1–0	6–2
Gwardia Warsaw	1–0	2–1		0–1	3–2	2–1	4–1	2–0	6–1	5–0	3–1	4–0
Lech Poznań	3–1	1–4	0–4		3–4	1–1	1–2	0–1	2–0	4–0	0–1	1–1
Lechia Gdańsk	2–0	0–1	0–1	1–0		1–0	0–0	2–0	0–0	1–0	0–0	5–0
Legia Warsaw	4–0	1–2	4–3	2–1	8–1		3–1	6–0	1–2	5–1	2–2	3–0
ŁKS Łódź	2–2	1–0	2–1	8–1	1–2	4–2		4–0	1–0	3–1	4–2	1–1
Odra Opole	5–0	1–0	2–5	3–1	0–0	0–2	0–3		2–1	0–1	1–3	2–1
Polonia Bytom	2–2	0–0	4–0	1–0	1–1	3–4	0–0	1–0		3–1	4–2	0–0
Ruch Chorzów	4–1	0–3	2–2	2–1	4–1	2–0	3–1	1–1	1–4		0–2	6–2
Wisła Kraków	5–1	1–1	0–2	1–2	2–0	2–2	1–7	2–3	2–0	4–4		2–2
Zagłębie Sosnowiec	1–1	2–2	1–1	3–1	2–1	2–2	1–1	3–2	3–2	0–0	1–0	

Source: 90minut.pl (in Polish)
Legend: Blue = home team win; Yellow = draw; Red = away team win.

== Top goalscorers ==
Rank	Player	Club	Goals
1	(Poland) Lucjan Brychczy	Legia Warsaw	19
2	(Poland) Henryk Kempny	Legia Warsaw	17
2	(Poland) Władysław Soporek	ŁKS Łódź	17
4	(Poland) Stanisław Baran	ŁKS Łódź	15
4	(Poland) Antoni Rogoza	Wisła Kraków	15
6	(Poland) Roman Lentner	Górnik Zabrze	14
7	(Poland) Teodor Anioła	Lech Poznań	13
7	(Poland) Stanisław Hachorek	Gwardia Warszawa	13
9	(Poland) Krzysztof Baszkiewicz	Gwardia Warszawa	12
9	(Poland) Edward Jankowski	Górnik Zabrze	12

== Attendances ==
#	Club	Average
1	Górnik Zabrze	27,273
2	ŁKS	25,000
3	Ruch Chorzów	22,182
4	Zagłębie Sosnowiec	20,364
5	Polonia Bytom	18,364
6	Legia Warszawa	17,545
7	Wisła Kraków	17,182
8	Lechia Gdańsk	16,727
9	Gwardia Warszawa	16,364
10	Lech Poznań	13,273
11	Odra Opole	9,364
12	Górnik Radlin	5,182
