= Jan Wilim =

Polish footballer

Personal information
- Date of birth: 9 December 1943 (age 82)
- Place of birth: Katowice, Poland
- Position: Midfielder

Senior career*
Years	Team	Apps	(Gls)
1963–1975	Szombierki Bytom	283	(48)
- Chrobry Głogów

International career
1966	Poland	3	(0)
- * Club domestic league appearances and goals

Jan Wilim (born 9 December 1943) is a Polish former footballer who played as a midfielder. His brother Jerzy was also a footballer.

He played in three matches for the Poland national team in 1966.
