= 1938 Ekstraklasa =

18th season of top-tier football league in Poland

Liga
- Season: 1938
- Champions: Ruch Chorzów (5th title)
- Top goalscorer: Teodor Peterek (21 goals)

Statistics of Ekstraklasa for the 1938 season.

== Overview ==
The championship was contested by 10 teams, and Ruch Chorzów won the title.

== League table ==
Pos	Team	Pld	W	D	L	GF	GA	GD	Pts
1	Ruch Chorzów (C)	18	13	1	4	57	35	+22	27
2	Warta Poznań	18	9	3	6	58	38	+20	21
3	Wisła Kraków	18	8	4	6	41	36	+5	20
4	Polonia Warsaw	18	9	1	8	40	35	+5	19
5	Pogoń Lwów	18	9	1	8	23	26	−3	19
6	AKS Chorzów	18	8	2	8	42	30	+12	18
7	KS Cracovia	18	8	2	8	37	42	−5	18
8	Warszawianka Warszawa	18	7	1	10	34	46	−12	15
9	ŁKS Łódź (R)	18	4	4	10	25	45	−20	12
10	Śmigły Wilno (R)	18	5	1	12	29	50	−21	11

Source: 90minut.pl (in Polish)
(C) Champions; (R) Relegated

== Results ==
Home \ Away	AKS	CRA	ŁKS	POG	PWA	RUC	ŚMI	WAW	WAR	WIS
AKS Chorzów		5–1	3–2	3–1	1–0	2–4	7–1	3–0	4–0	0–0
Cracovia	4–2		6–2	2–3	0–2	3–2	3–0	1–3	5–2	2–1
ŁKS Łódź	2–1	0–1		3–0	3–2	2–2	1–1	3–0	0–0	0–0
Pogoń Lwów	1–0	2–1	1–0		1–3	3–1	3–2	3–0	1–1	2–1
Polonia Warsaw	4–2	2–2	2–1	1–0		0–3	5–2	5–2	3–1	2–3
Ruch Chorzów	3–2	4–0	5–0	3–1	3–2		5–2	6–2	3–2	4–2
Śmigły Wilno	3–1	1–3	4–0	0–1	0–3	2–4		4–1	0–1	1–0
Warszawianka	0–3	2–0	4–1	2–0	3–1	1–4	6–2		2–1	2–3
Warta Poznań	4–3	7–1	6–2	2–0	7–1	6–0	2–3	3–3		6–2
Wisła Kraków	0–0	2–2	7–3	1–0	4–2	3–1	4–1	3–1	5–7	

Source: 90minut.pl (in Polish)
Legend: Blue = home team win; Yellow = draw; Red = away team win.
