= Zygmunt Schmidt =

Polish footballer (born 1941)

Personal information
- Date of birth: 27 April 1941 (age 85)
- Position: Forward

Senior career*
Years	Team	Apps	(Gls)
1958–1970	GKS Katowice		
1970–1971	AZ'67 Alkmaar	28	(2)

International career
1966–1969	Poland	13	(0)
- * Club domestic league appearances and goals

Zygmunt Schmidt (born 27 April 1941) is a Polish former footballer who played as a forward. He made thirteen appearances for the Poland national team from 1966 to 1969.
