= Eugeniusz Lerch =

Polish footballer (1939–2024)

Personal information
- Date of birth: 15 February 1939
- Place of birth: Chorzów, Poland
- Date of death: 20 January 2024 (aged 84)
- Position: Forward

Youth career
- 1950–1957: Unia Chorzów / Unia-Ruch Chorzów / Ruch Chorzów

Senior career*
| Years | Team | Apps | (Gls) |
| 1957–1967 | Ruch Chorzów | 199 | (95) |
| 1968–1974 | ROW Rybnik | 95 | (21) |
| 1974–1976 | Maribyrnong Polonia | | |
| Total | | 294 | (106) |

International career
| | Poland U21 | 11 | (4) |

Managerial career
- Grunwald Halemba
- Zgoda Bielszowice
- AKS Chorzów
- Slavia Ruda Śląska
- Walcownia Czechowice-Dziedzice
- Gwarek Tarnowskie Góry
- Ruch Chorzów (youth coordinator)
- 1994: Ruch Chorzów (assistant manager)
- * Club domestic league appearances and goals

Eugeniusz Lerch (15 February 1939 – 20 January 2024) was a Polish football forward best known for his time at his hometown club Ruch Chorzów. After retirement, he went on to coaching.

Lerch featured in 294 matches in the Poland's highest league. He scored 106 goals during his career, representing both Ruch Chorzów and ROW Rybnik. Notably, Lerch won the Polish Championship with Ruch in 1960. He spent the last years of his career in Australia before retiring in 1976.

Lerch cited Gerard Cieślik as his inspiration, first having seen Cieślik play at the Silesian Stadium when Lerch was aged 9, and Ruch hosted Garbarnia in a league match.

Lerch died on 20 January 2024, at the age of 84. He was buried five days later at the cemetery on Dąbrowskiego Street in Chorzów.

== Honours ==
Ruch Chorzów

- Ekstraklasa: 1960
