= Józef Gałeczka =

Polish footballer (1939–2021)

Personal information
- Date of birth: 28 February 1939
- Place of birth: Gleiwitz, Germany
- Date of death: 7 July 2021 (aged 82)
- Height: 1.66 m (5 ft 5 in)
- Position: Forward

Senior career*
| Years | Team | Apps | (Gls) |
| 1952–1954 | Unia FOch Gliwice | | |
| 1955–1960 | Piast Gliwice | | |
| 1960 | Polonia North Side | | |
| 1960–1961 | Polonia Sydney | | |
| 1962–1972 | Zagłębie Sosnowiec | 253 | (98) |
| 1972–1973 | Boulogne | | |

International career
- Poland U21
| 1962–1966 | Poland | 18 | (5) |

Managerial career
- 1974–1975: Zagłębie Sosnowiec
- 1976–1980: Zagłębie Sosnowiec
- 1987–1989: Zagłębie Sosnowiec
- * Club domestic league appearances and goals

Józef Gałeczka (28 February 1939 – 7 July 2021) was a Polish footballer who played as a forward. He was top scorer in the Ekstraklasa in 1964 with 18 goals.

== Honours ==
=== Player ===
Zagłębie Sosnowiec

- Polish Cup: 1962, 1962–63

Individual

- Ekstraklasa top scorer: 1963–64

=== Manager ===
Zagłębie Sosnowiec

- Polish Cup: 1976–77, 1977–78
