= Ekstraklasa =

Professional association football league in Poland

- Organising body: Ekstraklasa S.A.
- Founded: 4 December 1926; 99 years ago
- First season: 1927
- Country: Poland
- Confederation: UEFA
- Number of clubs: 18 (since 2021–22)
- Level on pyramid: 1
- Relegation to: I liga
- Domestic cup(s): Polish Cup; Polish Super Cup
- International cup(s): UEFA Champions League; UEFA Europa League; UEFA Conference League
- Current champions: Lech Poznań (10th title) (2025–26)
- Most championships: Legia Warsaw (15 titles)
- Most appearances: Łukasz Surma (559)
- Top scorer: Ernest Pohl (186)
- Broadcasters: Canal+ Polska; TVP Sport (one game per week)
- Website: ekstraklasa.org
- Current: 2026–27 Ekstraklasa

Ekstraklasa (Polish pronunciation: [ˌɛkstraˈklasa]; meaning "Extra Class" in Polish), officially known as PKO Bank Polski Ekstraklasa due to its sponsorship by PKO Bank Polski, is a professional association football league in Poland and the highest level of the Polish football league system.

Contested by 18 clubs, operating a system of promotion and relegation with the I liga, seasons start in July, and end in May or June the following year. Teams play a total of 34 games each. Games are played on Fridays, Saturdays, Sundays and Mondays. The winner of the Ekstraklasa qualifies for the Polish Super Cup. Since 2005, the league is operated by the Ekstraklasa Spółka Akcyjna.

The Ekstraklasa (former I liga) was officially formed as Liga Polska on 4–5 December 1926 in Warsaw, since 1 March 1927 as Liga Piłki Nożnej (Polish pronunciation: [ˈliɡa ˈpiwkʲi ˈnɔʐnɛj]), but the Polish Football Association (Polish: Polski Związek Piłki Nożnej, PZPN) had been in existence since 20 December 1919, a year after the independence of Poland in 1918. The first games of the freshly created league took place on 3 April 1927, while the first national non-league football championship took place in 1920.

A total of 87 teams have played in the top division of Polish football since the founding of the league, 20 of which have won the title. The current champions are Lech Poznań, who won their 10th title in the 2025–26 season.

== History ==
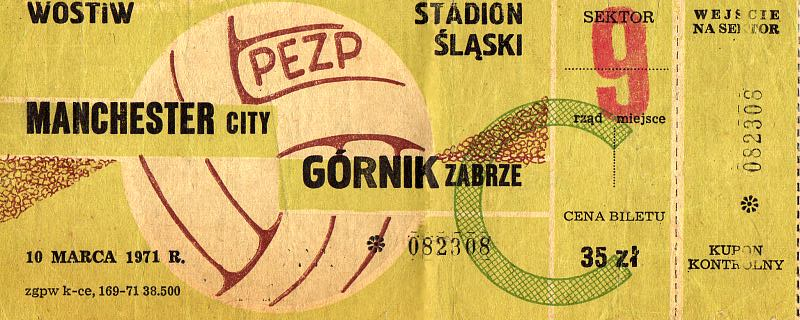
Ticket for the match between Górnik Zabrze and Manchester City in the 1970–71 European Cup Winners' Cup

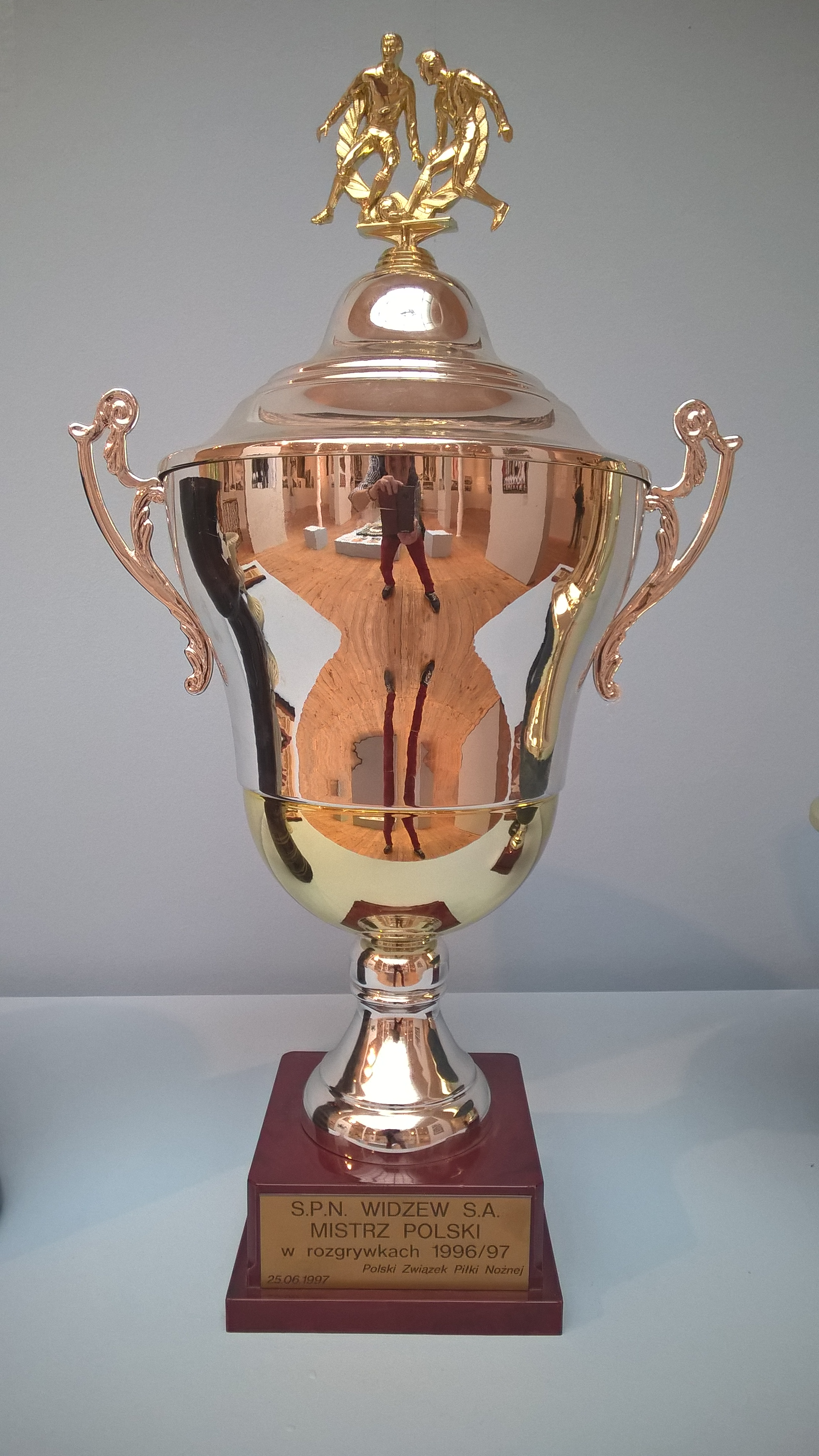
1996–97 Polish Championship trophy for Widzew Łódź

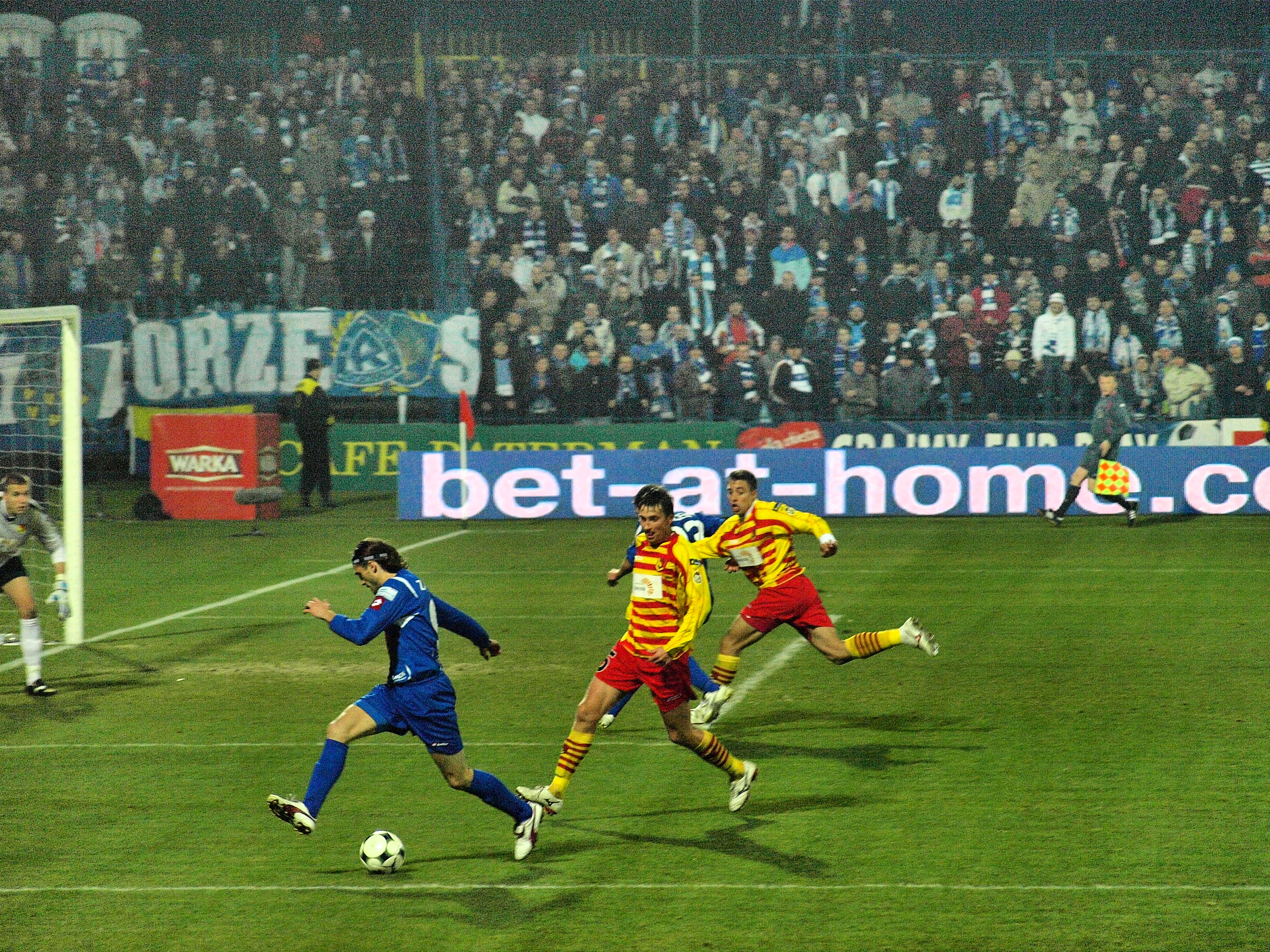
Match between Ruch Chorzów and Jagiellonia Białystok (5–2) in the 2009–10 Ekstraklasa

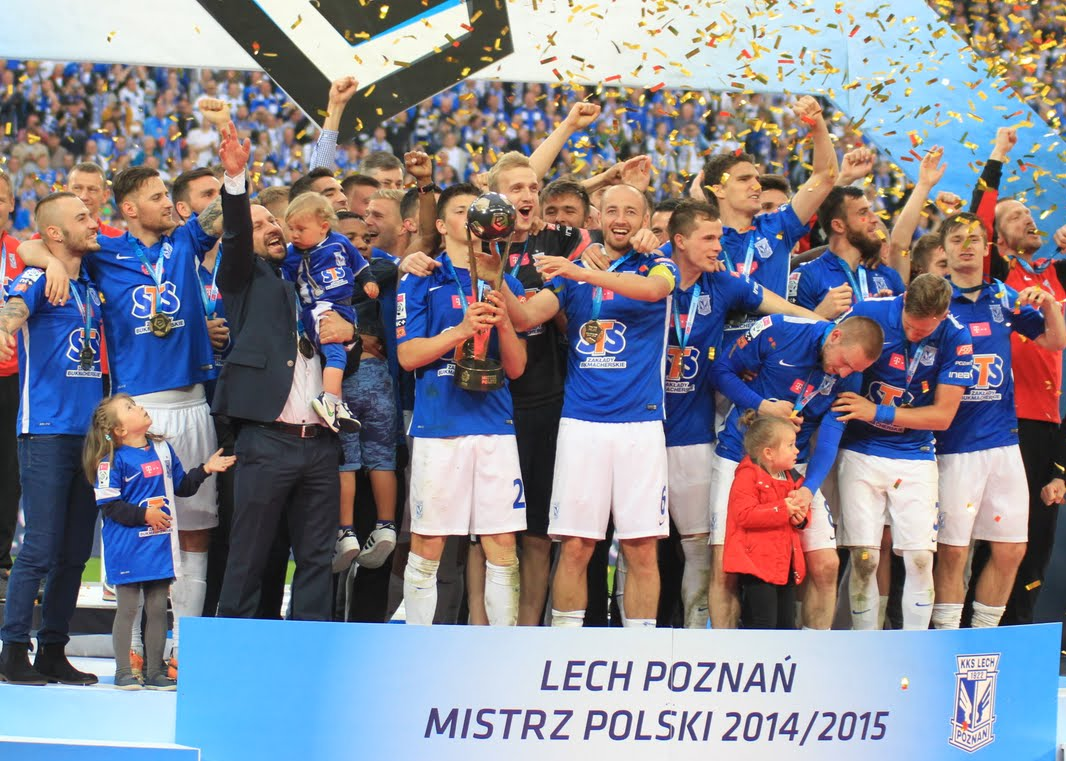
Lech Poznań players celebrate winning the 2014–15 Ekstraklasa

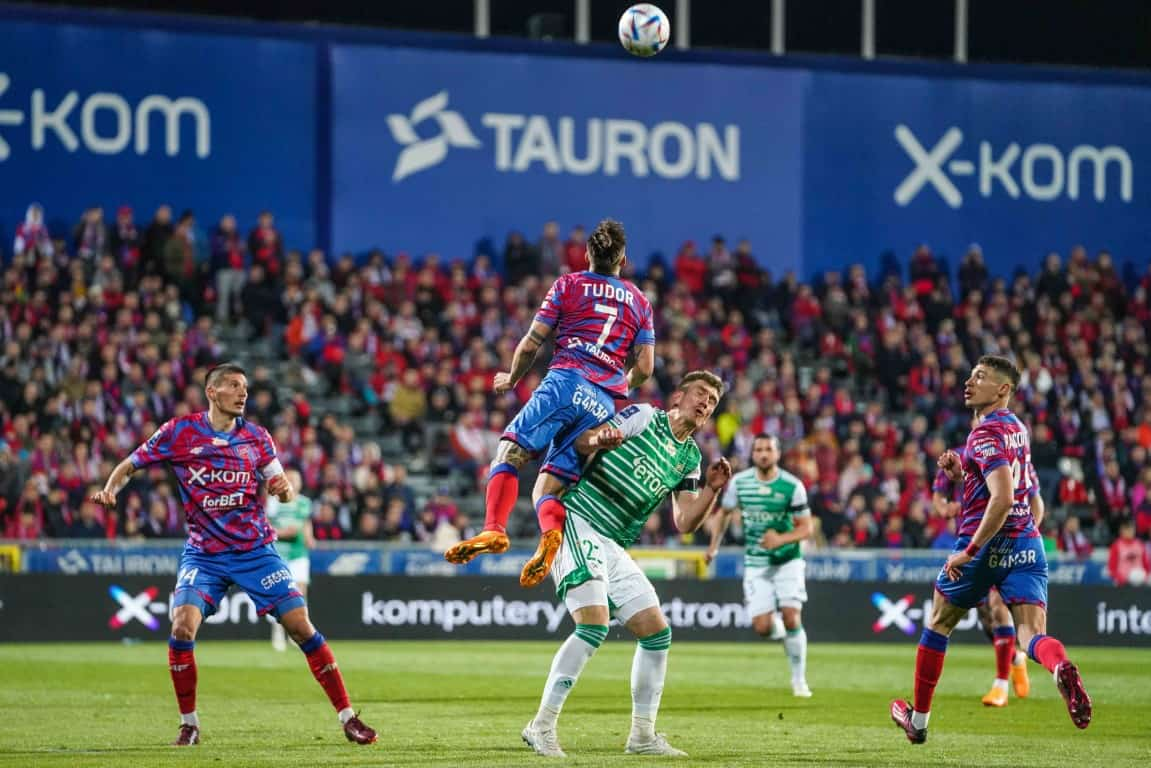
Match between Raków Częstochowa and Lechia Gdańsk (4–0) in the 2022–23 Ekstraklasa

=== Naming ===
- 1927–1948: Liga
- 1949–2004: I liga
- 2004–2005: Idea Ekstraklasa
- 2005–2008: Orange Ekstraklasa
- 2011–2015: T-Mobile Ekstraklasa
- 2016–2019: Lotto Ekstraklasa
- since 2019: PKO Bank Polski Ekstraklasa

=== Creation of the Polish Football League ===
On 4–5 December 1926 in Warsaw, representatives from several Polish clubs met to discuss the creation of a league. It is unknown where the idea of a Polish league originated from, however a national league was thought to be a much more practical solution than hitherto practiced two-stage system of regional matches followed by a national match.

To the dismay of clubs' officials, the PZPN was not receptive to the idea of a national league and therefore sought to thwart it. However, it turned out that virtually all but one of the Polish clubs supported the idea. The decision to create it was made regardless what PZPN's representatives thought of it. In late February 1927, at the PZPN's meeting in Warsaw, its officials openly opposed the formation of a league, but the clubs, allegedly egged on by some generals from the Polish Army (which, after May Coup of 1926, played a key role in all aspects of public life), proceeded anyway. The creation of the League was announced on 1 March 1927.

=== Cracovia ===
The only opponent of the league's formation was Cracovia – a very influential and strong organization in Polish football of the 1920s. Cracovia's boycott was because its chairman, Dr. Edward Cetnarowski, at the same time held the post of the director of the PZPN. Cetnarowski was a personality known not only in Poland, but also in other countries. It was due to his efforts that in September 1923, Cracovia toured Spain, drawing 1–1 with Barcelona and losing 0–1 to Real Madrid. In October, also thanks to Cetnarowski, Sevilla travelled to Kraków, losing 2–3 to Cracovia.

=== Early years of the league ===
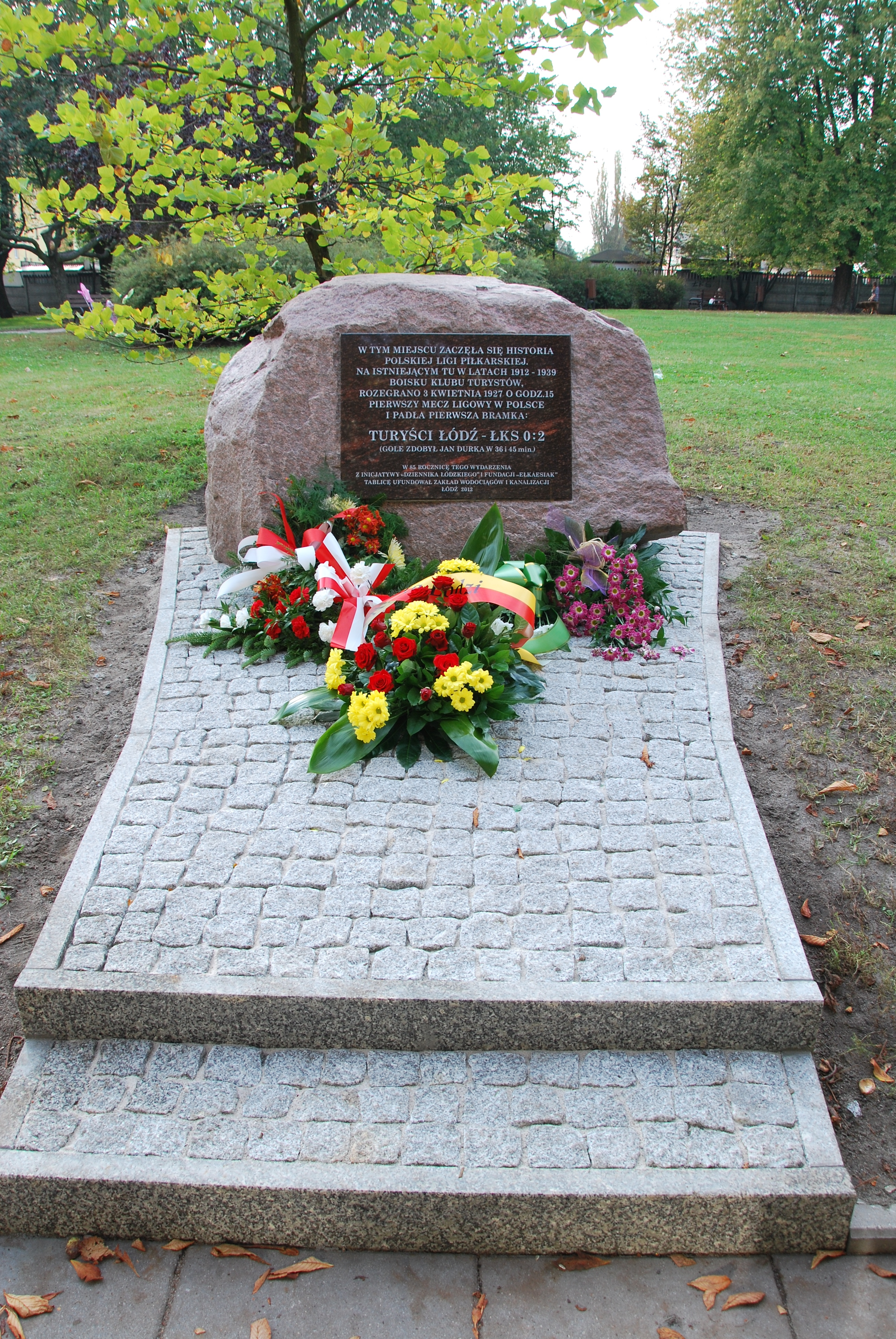
Memorial at the site of the first league match, between Klub Turystów Łódź and ŁKS Łódź

Games of the first league championships started on 3 April 1927. All major teams (except for Cracovia) took part in it. This is the list of the teams (in the order they finished in November 1927):

- Wisła Kraków
- 1. FC Kattowitz
- Warta Poznań
- Pogoń Lwów
- Legia Warsaw
- Klub Turystów Łódź
- ŁKS Łódź
- Polonia Warsaw
- Czarni Lwów
- Toruński KS
- Hasmonea Lwów
- Ruch Chorzów
- KS Warszawianka
- Jutrzenka Kraków

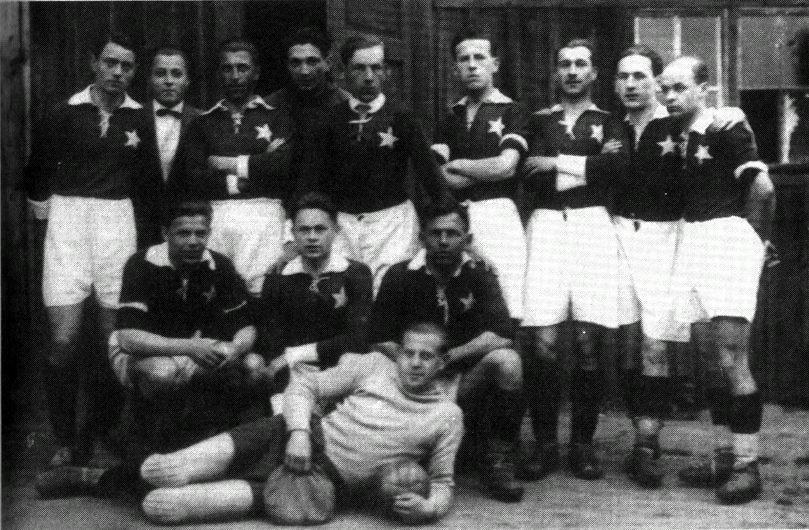
1927 Winning Wisła Kraków side.

In this first season of the league, fight for championship was decided between two powerful teams – Wisła Kraków and 1.FC Katowice. This rivalry was treated very seriously, not only by the two sides involved, but also by the whole nation. 1.FC was regarded as the team supported by German minority, while Wisła, at the end of this historic season, represented ambitions of all Poles.

Some time in the fall of 1927 in Katowice, an ill-fated game between 1.FC and Wisła took place. Stakes were very high – the winner would become the champion. Kraków's side won 2–0 and became the champion. 1.FC finished second, third was Warta Poznań.

=== 1920s ===
In 1928, Cracovia finally decided to enter the league, which was gladly accepted by all fans of football. However, championships were once again won by Wisła, with such excellent players as Henryk Reyman, Mieczysław Balcer and Jan Kotlarczyk. Warta Poznań was second and Legia Warsaw third. This was also the last year of 1.FC's glory. The team finished fifth, to be relegated forever at the end of 1929 season.

In 1929, another team (after Cracovia, Pogoń Lwów and Wisła) was added to the list of champions of Poland. This time it was Warta Poznań, which finished one point ahead of Garbarnia Kraków.

However, after the last game, on 1 December 1929, it was Garbarnia Kraków that was celebrating the championship. Two weeks later, in mid-December, PZPN's officials changed the result of the Warta – Klub Turystow Łódź game. Originally, Warta lost 1–2, but due to walkover (it was decided that one of Łódź's players did not have all necessary documents), this was changed to 3–0 in favor of Poznań's side. As a result of the decision, Warta (with 33 points) became the champion, Garbarnia finished second with 32 points and Klub Turystow was relegated.

In 1930, Cracovia regained the championship, (to repeat this success in 1932) and a year later another Kraków's side, Garbarnia, won the league. It is clear that the 1927–1932 period was marked by dominance of teams from Kraków. During this time, only once (Warta Poznań, 1929) the championship was won by a side from a different city. The 1931 champion, Garbarnia, was unique as this was the first time that the league had been won by a side whose all players had been bought from other teams.

=== 1930s ===
As has been said, the early 1930s marked a decline of the dominance of Kraków and Lwów as centers of Polish football. The point of gravity slowly moved towards west – to Upper Silesia. In 1932 the champion was Cracovia, but starting in 1933, Ruch Chorzów (then: Ruch Wielkie Hajduki) completely dominated the league, being the champion for four times in a row.

Ruch, with such excellent players as Teodor Peterek, Ernest Wilimowski and Gerard Wodarz was by far the best team in those years. For example, in 1934 it finished seven points ahead of second Cracovia. Other important teams of these years were: Cracovia, Wisła Kraków, Pogoń Lwów and Warta Poznań.

In 1933 and 1934 there were 12 teams in the League. In 1935 this number was cut to 11 and in 1936 – to 10. Football officials did it on purpose – with fewer teams, the competition was supposed to be harder, which would attract fans to the stadiums. However, supporters' turnout was not impressive, with Ruch Chorzów as the most popular team, both at home and away.

In late 1935 (the league held its games in the spring-summer-fall system) fans were shocked to find that Cracovia, the legend of this sport, was relegated to the A-class. Kraków's side absence lasted for a year – it returned in 1937, to become the champion.

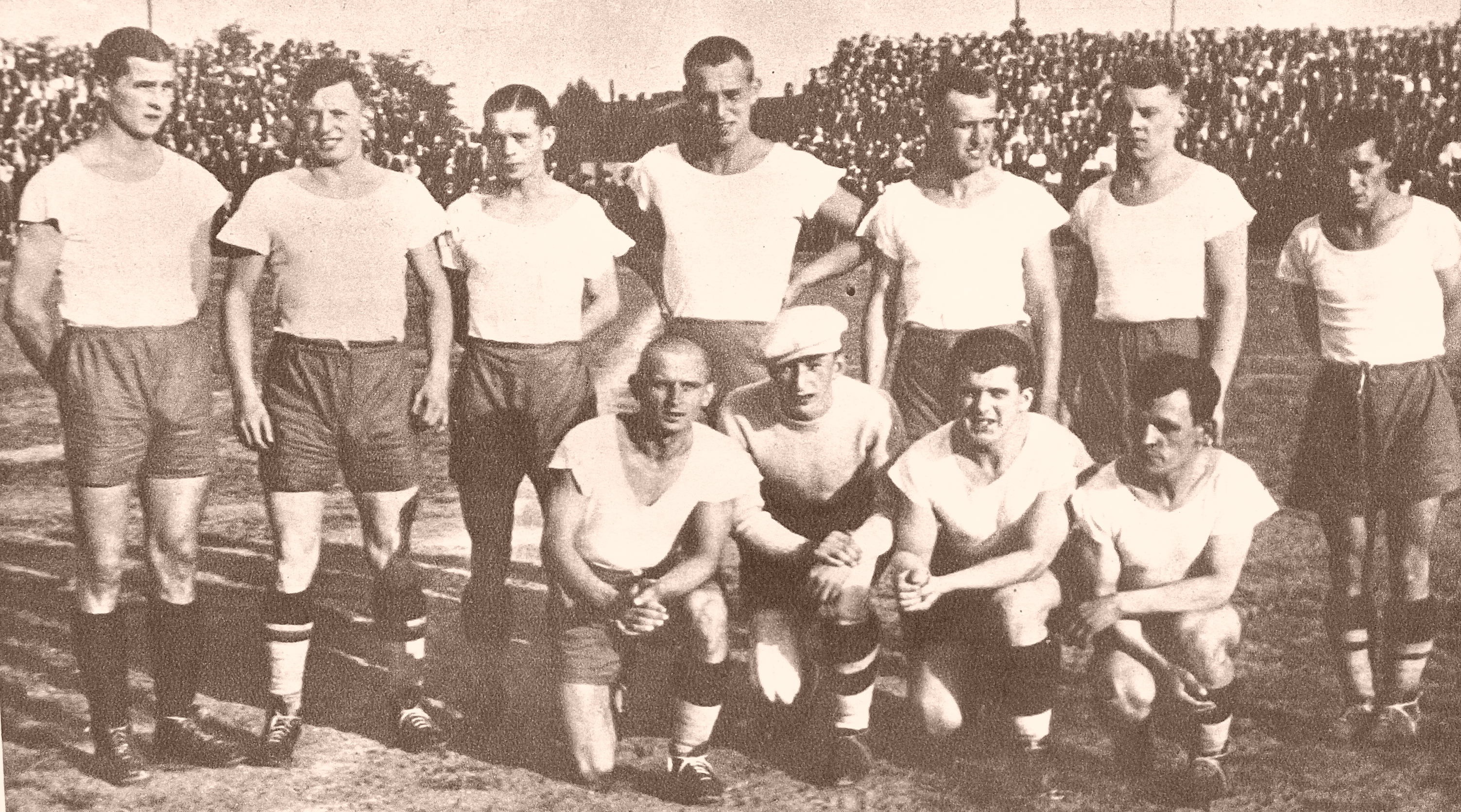
1938 winning Ruch Chorzów side

Ruch Chorzów was still the dominant team, winning the Championships in 1936 and 1938. In 1937 Ruch's streak of four consecutive champions was broken by Cracovia, and in 1939 the championships were not finished. By 31 August 1939, after some 12 games, Ruch was the leader of the 10-team League. Last games of this summer occurred on 20 August. Then, a break was planned, because the National Team was going to play a few international friendlies. Games were to be re-introduced on 10 September.

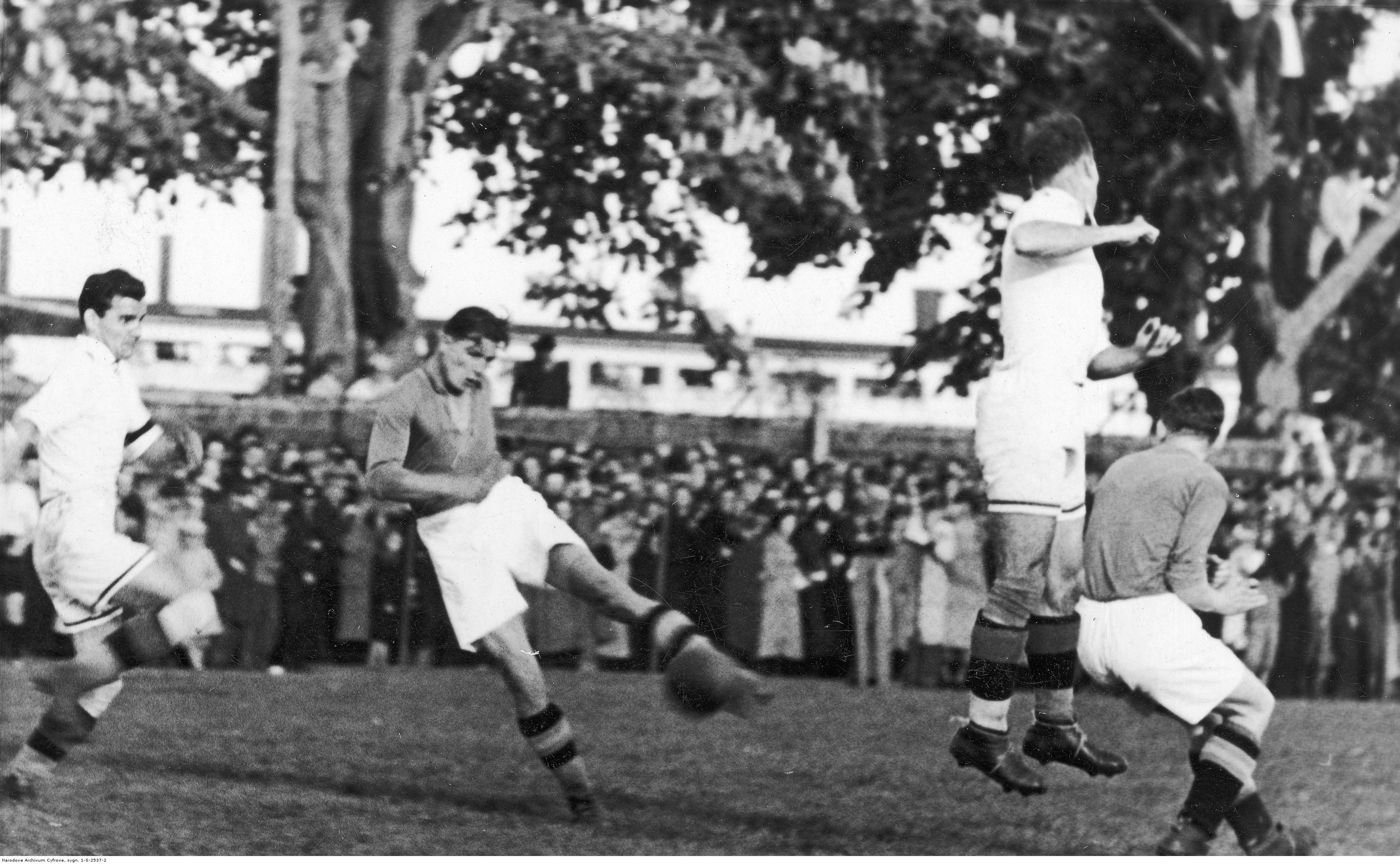
Match between Pogoń Lwów and Ruch Chorzów (3–2) in the 1939 season

This is the list of the ten teams that participated in last, historic games for championships of interwar Poland. Teams are presented according to their position on the table, as of 31 August 1939:

1. Ruch Chorzów
2. Wisła Kraków
3. Pogoń Lwów
4. AKS Chorzów
5. Warta Poznań
6. Cracovia
7. Polonia Warsaw
8. Garbarnia Kraków
9. Warszawianka Warsaw
10. Union Touring Łódź

=== After World War II ===
As a result of the Second World War, the borders of Poland changed significantly. Lwów, one of the centers of Polish football (with such teams as Pogoń Lwów, Czarni Lwów and Lechia Lwów) was annexed by Soviet Union and all these teams ceased to exist. Lwów's football officials and players moved westwards, creating such clubs as Odra Opole and Pogoń Szczecin, and reviving Polonia Bytom (see: Recovered Territories). Another important center, Wilno (with the team Śmigły Wilno), was also annexed by the Soviets (see: Polish areas annexed by the Soviet Union). In exchange, Poland gained a large swath of formerly German territory in particular in Silesia (which also formed part of Poland centuries prior), with its capital Wrocław (home of double champion Śląsk Wrocław) and cities such as Zabrze (home of 14-times champion Górnik Zabrze), Bytom (home of champions Polonia Bytom and Szombierki Bytom) and Lubin (home of double champion Zagłębie Lubin). 18 teams played in the league between seasons of 1992 and 1998.

The 2020s was marked by the league's rise in the UEFA coefficient, boosted by the good results of Polish clubs in European competitions with Lech Poznań reaching the quarterfinals of the UEFA Conference League in the 2022–23 season.

== Clubs ==
There are 18 clubs in the Ekstraklasa. During the course of the season each club plays the others twice, once at their home stadium and once at that of their opponents, for a total of 34 games. From the 2013–14 till the 2019–20 season, after the 30th round the table was divided into 'champion' (top eight teams) and 'relegation' (bottom eight teams) groups. Each team played seven more games (teams ranked 1–4 and 9–12 would host four games at home). The 2016–17 season was the last when teams started an extra round with half the points (rounded up) achieved during the first phase of 30 matches. The changes extended the season to a total of 296 matches played. The 2021–22 season started with 18 teams, instead of 16.

Clubs as of the 2026–27 season.

Team	Location	Venue	Capacity
Cracovia	Kraków	Józef Piłsudski Stadium	15,016
GKS Katowice	Katowice	Arena Katowice	15,048
Górnik Zabrze	Zabrze	Arena Zabrze ^{2}	28,499
Jagiellonia Białystok	Białystok	Chorten Arena	22,432
Korona Kielce	Kielce	EXBUD Arena	15,122
Lech Poznań	Poznań	Enea Stadion	42,837
Legia Warsaw	Warsaw	Polish Army Stadium	31,103
Motor Lublin	Lublin	Motor Lublin Arena	15,247
Piast Gliwice	Gliwice	Piotr Wieczorek Stadium	10,037
Pogoń Szczecin	Szczecin	Florian Krygier Stadium	21,163
Radomiak Radom	Radom	Czachor Brothers Stadium	14,440
Raków Częstochowa	Częstochowa	zondacrypto Arena	5,500
Śląsk Wrocław	Wrocław	Tarczyński Arena Wrocław	42,771
Widzew Łódź	Łódź	Widzew Łódź Stadium	18,018
Wieczysta Kraków	Kraków	Henryk Reyman Synerise Arena	33,326^{3}
Wisła Kraków	Kraków	Henryk Reyman Synerise Arena	33,326
Wisła Płock	Płock	Kazimierz Górski Orlen Stadium	15,004
Zagłębie Lubin	Lubin	KGHM Zagłebie Arena	16,068

1. Upgrading to 31,871.
2. Due to the fact Wieczysta Stadium doesn't meet the Ekstraklasa regulations, Wieczysta Kraków host their matches at the Henryk Reyman Synerise Arena.

== List of champions ==
- 1921: Cracovia (1)
- 1922: Pogoń Lwów (1)
- 1923: Pogoń Lwów (2)
- 1924: Abandoned°
- 1925: Pogoń Lwów (3)
- 1926: Pogoń Lwów (4)
- 1927: Wisła Kraków (1)
- 1928: Wisła Kraków (2)
- 1929: Warta Poznań (1)
- 1930: Cracovia (2)
- 1931: Garbarnia Kraków (1)
- 1932: Cracovia (3)
- 1933: Ruch Chorzów (1)
- 1934: Ruch Chorzów (2)
- 1935: Ruch Chorzów (3)
- 1936: Ruch Chorzów (4)
- 1937: Cracovia (4)
- 1938: Ruch Chorzów (5)
- 1939: Abandoned°°
- 1946: Polonia Warsaw (1)
- 1947: Warta Poznań (2)
- 1948: Cracovia (5)
- 1949: Wisła Kraków (3)
- 1950: Wisła Kraków (4)
- 1951: Wisła Kraków°°° (5)
- 1952: Ruch Chorzów (6)
- 1953: Ruch Chorzów (7)
- 1954: Polonia Bytom (1)
- 1955: Legia Warsaw (1)
- 1956: Legia Warsaw (2)
- 1957: Górnik Zabrze (1)
- 1958: ŁKS Łódź (1)
- 1959: Górnik Zabrze (2)
- 1960: Ruch Chorzów (8)
- 1961: Górnik Zabrze (3)
- 1962: Polonia Bytom (2)
- 1962–63: Górnik Zabrze (4)
- 1963–64: Górnik Zabrze (5)
- 1964–65: Górnik Zabrze (6)
- 1965–66: Górnik Zabrze (7)
- 1966–67: Górnik Zabrze (8)
- 1967–68: Ruch Chorzów (9)
- 1968–69: Legia Warsaw (3)
- 1969–70: Legia Warsaw (4)
- 1970–71: Górnik Zabrze (9)
- 1971–72: Górnik Zabrze (10)
- 1972–73: Stal Mielec (1)
- 1973–74: Ruch Chorzów (10)
- 1974–75: Ruch Chorzów (11)
- 1975–76: Stal Mielec (2)
- 1976–77: Śląsk Wrocław (1)
- 1977–78: Wisła Kraków (6)
- 1978–79: Ruch Chorzów (12)
- 1979–80: Szombierki Bytom (1)
- 1980–81: Widzew Łódź (1)
- 1981–82: Widzew Łódź (2)
- 1982–83: Lech Poznań (1)
- 1983–84: Lech Poznań (2)
- 1984–85: Górnik Zabrze (11)
- 1985–86: Górnik Zabrze (12)
- 1986–87: Górnik Zabrze (13)
- 1987–88: Górnik Zabrze (14)
- 1988–89: Ruch Chorzów (13)
- 1989–90: Lech Poznań (3)
- 1990–91: Zagłębie Lubin (1)
- 1991–92: Lech Poznań (4)
- 1992–93: Lech Poznań (5)
- 1993–94: Legia Warsaw (5)
- 1994–95: Legia Warsaw (6)
- 1995–96: Widzew Łódź (3)
- 1996–97: Widzew Łódź (4)
- 1997–98: ŁKS Łódź (2)
- 1998–99: Wisła Kraków (7)
- 1999–2000: Polonia Warsaw (2)
- 2000–01: Wisła Kraków (8)
- 2001–02: Legia Warsaw (7)
- 2002–03: Wisła Kraków (9)
- 2003–04: Wisła Kraków (10)
- 2004–05: Wisła Kraków (11)
- 2005–06: Legia Warsaw (8)
- 2006–07: Zagłębie Lubin (2)
- 2007–08: Wisła Kraków (12)
- 2008–09: Wisła Kraków (13)
- 2009–10: Lech Poznań (6)
- 2010–11: Wisła Kraków (14)
- 2011–12: Śląsk Wrocław (2)
- 2012–13: Legia Warsaw (9)
- 2013–14: Legia Warsaw (10)
- 2014–15: Lech Poznań (7)
- 2015–16: Legia Warsaw (11)
- 2016–17: Legia Warsaw (12)
- 2017–18: Legia Warsaw (13)
- 2018–19: Piast Gliwice (1)
- 2019–20: Legia Warsaw (14)
- 2020–21: Legia Warsaw (15)
- 2021–22: Lech Poznań (8)
- 2022–23: Raków Częstochowa (1)
- 2023–24: Jagiellonia Białystok (1)
- 2024–25: Lech Poznań (9)
- 2025–26: Lech Poznań (10)

°Abandoned due to the preparations of the Poland national team to participate in the 1924 Olympic Football Tournament.
°°Abandoned due to the outbreak of World War II. By 31 August 1939, Ruch Chorzów was the leader.
°°°In 1951, the Polish Football Association decided to give the Polish championship title to the winner of the Polish Cup, in order to increase the importance of the re-activated cup competition. Ruch Chorzów finished the league in 6th , but won the cup, beating 2–0 Wisła Kraków in the final game. Wisła Kraków were declated the league champion.

== Performance by club ==
Note: This list is not synonymous with a list of Polish football champions.
Bold indicates clubs playing in the top division in the 2026–27 season.

Titles	Team	Year(s)
15	**Legia Warsaw**	1955, 1956, 1969, 1970, 1994, 1995, 2002, 2006, 2013, 2014, 2016, 2017, 2018, 2020, 2021
14
14	**Górnik Zabrze**	1957, 1959, 1961, 1963, 1964, 1965, 1966, 1967, 1971, 1972, 1985, 1986, 1987, 1988
14	**Wisła Kraków**	1927, 1928, 1949, 1950, 1951, 1978, 1999, 2001, 2003, 2004, 2005, 2008, 2009, 2011
13	Ruch Chorzów	1933, 1934, 1935, 1936, 1938, 1952, 1953, 1960, 1968, 1974, 1975, 1979, 1989
10	**Lech Poznań**	1983, 1984, 1990, 1992, 1993, 2010, 2015, 2022, 2025, 2026
5	**Cracovia**	1921, 1930, 1932, 1937, 1948
4	Pogoń Lwów	1922, 1923, 1925, 1926
4	**Widzew Łódź**	1981, 1982, 1996, 1997
2	ŁKS Łódź	1958, 1998
2	Polonia Bytom	1954, 1962
2	Polonia Warsaw	1946, 2000
2	Stal Mielec	1973, 1976
2	**Śląsk Wrocław**	1977, 2012
2	Warta Poznań	1929, 1947
2	**Zagłębie Lubin**	1991, 2007
1	Garbarnia Kraków	1931
1	**Jagiellonia Białystok**	2024
1	**Piast Gliwice**	2019
1	**Raków Częstochowa**	2023
1	Szombierki Bytom	1980

=== Performance by regions ===
The following table lists the league champions by the Polish voivodeship regions (current, valid since 1999).

Region	Titles	Winning clubs
Silesia	32	Górnik Zabrze (14), Ruch Chorzów (13), Polonia Bytom (2), Szombierki Bytom (1), Piast Gliwice (1), Raków Częstochowa (1)
Lesser Poland	20	Wisła Kraków (14), Cracovia (5), Garbarnia Kraków (1)
Masovia	17	Legia Warsaw (15), Polonia Warsaw (2)
Greater Poland	12	Lech Poznań (10), Warta Poznań (2)
Łódź	6	Widzew Łódź (4), ŁKS Łódź (2)
Lower Silesia	4	Zagłębie Lubin (2), Śląsk Wrocław (2)
Subcarpathian	2	Stal Mielec (2)
Podlaskie	1	Jagiellonia Białystok (1)

=== Performance by towns ===
The following table lists the league champions by city.

City	Titles	Winning clubs
Kraków	20	Wisła Kraków (14), Cracovia (5), Garbarnia Kraków (1)
Warsaw	17	Legia Warsaw (15), Polonia Warsaw (2)
Zabrze	14	Górnik Zabrze (14)
Chorzów	13	Ruch Chorzów (13)
Poznań	12	Lech Poznań (10), Warta Poznań (2)
Łódź	6	Widzew Łódź (4), ŁKS Łódź (2)
Lwów	4	Pogoń Lwów (4)
Bytom	3	Polonia Bytom (2), Szombierki Bytom (1)
Lubin	2	Zagłębie Lubin (2)
Mielec	2	Stal Mielec (2)
Wrocław	2	Śląsk Wrocław (2)
Białystok	1	Jagiellonia Białystok (1)
Częstochowa	1	Raków Częstochowa (1)
Gliwice	1	Piast Gliwice (1)

== Honored teams ==
After winning a Polish championship titles, a representative star is placed above the team's badge to indicate achieving the feat.

The current (as of May 2026) officially sanctioned championship stars are:

- Golden star: 10 or more Polish championship titles:
  - Legia Warsaw (15)
  - Górnik Zabrze (14)
  - Ruch Chorzów (14)
  - Wisła Kraków (14)
  - Lech Poznań (10)
- Silver star: 5–9 Polish championship titles:
  - Cracovia (5)
- White star: 1–4 Polish championship titles:
  - Widzew Łódź (4)
  - Pogoń Lwów (4) - disbanded
  - ŁKS Łódź (2)
  - Polonia Bytom (2)
  - Polonia Warsaw (2)
  - Stal Mielec (2)
  - Śląsk Wrocław (2)
  - Warta Poznań (2)
  - Zagłębie Lubin (2)
  - Jagiellonia Białystok (1)
  - Piast Gliwice (1)
  - Raków Częstochowa (1)
  - Garbarnia Kraków (1)

== All-time league table ==
The all-time league table consists of all the teams that once participated in the Ekstraklasa. Data from the 1927 – 2025–26 seasons.

Source: Tabela wszech czasów 90minut.pl

Pos.	Club	Seasons	Current level	Matches played	Points	Total wins	Wins for 3 pts	Draws	Losses	Losses for −1 pts	Goals scored	Goals conceded	Goal difference
1	**Legia Warsaw**	89	1st	2502	3644	1229	559	624	649	3	4152	2644	+1508
2	**Wisła Kraków**	82	1st	2231	2927	984	404	559	688	6	3585	2685	+900
3	**Górnik Zabrze**	68	1st	2016	2609	853	316	569	594	1	2991	2283	+708
4	**Lech Poznań**	65	1st	1920	2549	795	428	527	598	8	2718	2204	+514
5	Ruch Chorzów	78	2nd	2101	2460	847	198	569	685	6	3147	2713	+434
6	**Pogoń Szczecin**	53	1st	1617	1835	555	275	450	612	7	1974	2152	-178
7	ŁKS Łódź	67	2nd	1790	1809	610	104	486	694	6	2297	2504	-207
8	**Śląsk Wrocław**	46	1st	1439	1684	509	234	428	502	5	1707	1754	-47
9	**Zagłębie Lubin**	37	1st	1183	1532	436	333	329	428	1	1492	1462	+30
10	**Widzew Łódź**	39	1st	1211	1531	472	226	364	375	6	1563	1427	+136
11	**Cracovia**	47	1st	1265	1463	458	235	317	490		1774	1771	+3
12	**GKS Katowice**	32	1st	962	1129	349	115	301	312	2	1123	1069	+54
13	Lechia Gdańsk	33	2nd	947	1082	315	208	250	382	1	1095	1276	-181
14	**Jagiellonia Białystok**	23	1st	763	1002	278	253	210	275	7	982	1050	-67
15	Polonia Warsaw	31	2nd	800	966	304	180	178	318		1165	1251	-86
16	Zagłębie Sosnowiec	36	4th	987	918	322	11	267	398	4	1180	1330	-150
17	Stal Mielec	30	2nd	903	909	291	52	272	334	6	1021	1087	-66
18	Polonia Bytom	35	2nd	889	879	289	32	272	328	4	1097	1139	-42
19	**Korona Kielce**	18	1st	605	784	202	202	178	225		713	808	-95
20	**Piast Gliwice**	16	1st	549	761	204	204	149	196		665	658	+7
21	**Wisła Płock**	17	1st	550	666	180	172	134	236		647	797	-150
22	Szombierki Bytom	25	5th	702	645	235		180	287	5	875	999	-124
23	Warta Poznań	22	2nd	542	590	222	45	101	219		979	881	+98
24	**Raków Częstochowa**	11	1st	373	568	162	153	91	120		496	423	+73
25	Arka Gdynia	17	2nd	542	546	153	84	156	233		556	728	-172
26	Gwardia Warsaw	23	not existing	572	539	195		149	228		682	764	-82
27	Odra Wodzisław Śląski	14	9th	418	529	145	145	94	179		487	570	-83
28	Odra Opole	22	2nd	564	523	182		159	223		645	740	-95
29	Amica Wronki	11	not existing	332	498	135	135	93	104		452	370	+82
30	GKS Bełchatów	12	5th	375	486	130	130	96	149		422	463	-41
31	Dyskobolia Grodzisk Wielkopolski	10	not existing	294	441	124	124	69	101		420	357	+63
32	Zawisza Bydgoszcz	14	3rd	430	376	126	22	98	206		461	651	-190
33	**Motor Lublin**	11	1st	342	312	94	24	112	136	12	353	484	-131
34	Garbarnia Kraków	15	6th	315	306	121		64	130		563	561	+2
35	Pogoń Lwów	13	abroad	273	304	130		44	99		537	439	+98
36	Stomil Olsztyn	8	5th	254	296	76	69	75	103		255	339	-84
37	Górnik Łęczna	8	3rd	257	276	70	70	66	121		260	391	-131
38	Stal Rzeszów	11	2nd	290	255	79		97	114		297	377	-80
39	Hutnik Kraków	7	3rd	234	254	75	23	81	78		299	284	+15
40	**Radomiak Radom**	6	1st	200	240	63	55	59	78		246	276	-30
41	KS Warszawianka	13	not existing	271	227	90		47	134		427	612	-185
42	Podbeskidzie Bielsko-Biała	6	2nd	201	222	54	54	60	87		225	310	-85
43	Olimpia Poznań	8	not existing	250	220	67	5	91	92	10	269	317	-48
44	AKS Chorzów	10	not existing	192	196	80		36	76		336	307	+29
45	Bruk-Bet Termalica Nieciecza	5	2nd	179	190	48	48	46	85		192	292	-100
45	Bałtyk Gdynia	7	6th	210	186	64		61	85	4	184	247	-63
47	ROW Rybnik	7	4th	198	165	50		65	83		165	233	-78
48	Górnik Wałbrzych	6	6th	180	154	52	2	55	73	7	190	243	-53
49	Zagłębie Wałbrzych	6	9th	160	142	50		42	68		131	166	-35
50	Czarni Lwów	7	not existing	164	141	56		29	79		265	326	-61
51	Górnik Radlin	8	7th	162	136	50		36	76		193	280	-87
52	Sokół Pniewy	4	not existing	136	130	36	16	42	58		128	190	-62
53	Polonia Bydgoszcz	7	6th	156	129	47		35	74		186	296	-110
54	Ruch Radzionków	3	5th	90	109	30	30	19	41		105	135	-30
55	Stal Stalowa Wola	4	3rd	132	103	32		44	56		113	173	-60
56	1. FC Katowice	3	9th	78	88	39		10	29		164	143	+21
57	GKS Tychy	3	3rd	90	86	28		30	32		105	113	-8
58	Klub Turystów Łódź	3	not existing	78	73	31		11	36		134	161	-27
59	KSZO Ostrowiec Świętokrzyski	3	4th	92	71	18	18	17	57		73	147	-74
60	Puszcza Niepołomice	2	2nd	68	68	15	15	23	30		76	112	-36
61	Siarka Tarnobrzeg	3	4th	102	65	19	3	24	59		88	169	-81
62	Arkonia Szczecin	4	5th	88	64	20		24	44		100	166	-66
63	Miedź Legnica	2	2nd	71	63	14	14	21	36		73	120	-47
64	Śląsk Świętochłowice	3	6th	66	45	19		7	40		84	166	-82
65	Lechia/Olimpia Gdańsk	1	not existing	34	40	11	11	7	16		39	59	-20
66	Unia Racibórz	2	7th	52	38	14		10	28		77	126	-49
67	Hasmonea Lwów	2	not existing	54	38	14		10	30		98	149	-51
68	Wawel Kraków	2	9th	32	37	13		11	8		50	36	+14
69	Igloopol Dębica	2	5th	64	37	9		19	36		43	121	-78
70	Strzelec 22 Siedlce	3	not existing	64	36	14		8	42		84	169	-85
71	Sandecja Nowy Sącz	1	3rd	37	33	6	6	15	16		34	54	-20
72	Szczakowianka Jaworzno	1	6th	30	32	8	8	8	14		40	54	-14
73	RKS Radomsko	1	5th	28	31	7	7	10	11		23	34	-11
74	TKS Toruń	2	not existing	54	30	13		4	37		84	185	-101
75	Podgórze Kraków	2	9th	42	27	11		5	26		56	105	-49
76	Górnik Polkowice	1	4th	26	23	6	6	5	15		17	37	-20
77	Tarnovia Tarnów	1	6th	26	22	10		2	14		42	48	-6
78	Świt Nowy Dwór Mazowiecki	1	4th	26	22	5	5	7	14		21	42	-21
79	Rymer Rybnik	1	8th	26	19	8		3	15		45	64	-19
80	GKS Jastrzębie	1	9th	30	19	8		8	14	5	24	43	-19
81	Dąb Katowice	2	not existing	36	14	7			29		29	97	-68
82	ŁTS-G Łódź	1	not existing	22	12	3		6	13		25	67	-42
83	Śmigły Wilno	1	not existing	18	11	5		1	12		29	50	-21
84	Jutrzenka Kraków	1	not existing	26	11	3		5	18		41	82	-41
85	Lechia Lwów	1	not existing	22	11	5		1	16		23	66	-43
86	Union Touring Łódź	1	not existing	12	3	1		1	10		15	51	-36

From 1927 to 2026, a total of 86 teams contested in the Ekstraklasa.

Bold- indicates teams currently playing in the 2025–26 season.

=== Explanation ===
1. In case of an equal amount of points between teams, positions are decided on the basis of goal difference, then a greater number of goals scored.
2. From the 1927 to the 1994–95 season, two points were awarded for a win and one point for a draw. From the 1986–87 to the 1989–90 season, a win by at least three goals additionally awarded one point, while one point was deducted for a loss by at least three goals. Since the 1995–96 season, three points are awarded for a win, and one point for a draw.
3. Includes championship and relegation play-off games (including 11 games in 1948, 1986–87, 1987–88, 1988–89), but does not include promotion/relegation play-offs between teams from different divisions.
4. Included matches from the unfinished 1939 season.

==== Penalty points ====
Includes penalties imposed by the Polish Football Association:

- In the 1934 season, the match between Garbarnia Kraków and ŁKS Łódź was declared a bilateral forfeit 3–3 (match did not take place due to the fault of both teams).
- Results of the following matches from the 1986–87 season (Lech Poznań – Polonia Bytom 1–1, Olimpia Poznań – Stal Mielec 1–3, Zagłębie Lubin – Ruch Chorzów 0–2) and the 1992–93 season (Wisła Kraków – Legia Warsaw 0–6, ŁKS Łódź – Olimpia Poznań 7–1) were invalidated due to suspicion of match-fixing. While the games were recognized as having taken place, the points and goals were nullified (which is reflected in the table). More: Sunday of Miracles.
- In the 1993–94 season, Legia Warsaw, Wisła Kraków and ŁKS Łódź were deducted three points for the events of the final round of the 1992–93 season.
- In the 2009–10 season, Jagiellonia Białystok were deducted 10 points for participating in the match-fixing scandal.
- In the 2012–13 season, Zagłębie Lubin were deducted three points for participating in the match-fixing scandal.
- In the 2015–16 season, Wisła Kraków, Górnik Zabrze, Lechia Gdańsk and Ruch Chorzów were deducted one point each for failing to meet the licensing requirements.
- In the 2016–17 season, Ruch Chorzów were deducted four points for failing to meet the licensing requirements.
- In the 2020–21 season, Cracovia were deducted five points for participating in the match-fixing scandal during the 2003–04 II liga season.

== Top goalscorers ==
Year	Tally	Player	Club
1927	37 goals	(Poland) Henryk Reyman	Wisła Kraków
1928	28 goals	(Poland) Ludwik Gintel	Cracovia
1929	25 goals	(Poland) Rochus Nastula	Czarni Lwów
1930	24 goals	(Poland) Karol Kossok	Cracovia
1931	24 goals	(Poland) Walerian Kisieliński	Wisła Kraków
1932	16 goals	(Poland) Kajetan Kryszkiewicz	Warta Poznań
1933	19 goals	(Poland) Artur Woźniak	Wisła Kraków
1934	33 goals	(Poland) Ernst Wilimowski	Ruch Hajduki Wielkie
1935	22 goals	(Poland) Michał Matyas	Pogoń Lwów
1936	18 goals	(Poland) Teodor Peterek (Poland) Ernst Wilimowski	Ruch Hajduki Wielkie; Ruch Hajduki Wielkie
1937	12 goals	(Poland) Artur Woźniak	Wisła Kraków
1938	21 goals	(Poland) Teodor Peterek	Ruch Hajduki Wielkie
1939	12 goals	(Poland) Ernst Wilimowski	Ruch Hajduki Wielkie
1948	31 goals	(Poland) Józef Kohut	Wisła Kraków
1949	20 goals	(Poland) Teodor Anioła	Lech Poznań
1950	21 goals	(Poland) Teodor Anioła	Lech Poznań
1951	20 goals	(Poland) Teodor Anioła	Lech Poznań
1952	11 goals	(Poland) Gerard Cieślik	Ruch Chorzów
1953	24 goals	(Poland) Gerard Cieślik	Ruch Chorzów
1954	13 goals	(Poland) Henryk Kempny (Poland) Ernst Pohl	Polonia Bytom; Legia Warsaw
1955	16 goals	(Poland) Stanisław Hachorek	Gwardia Warsaw
1956	21 goals	(Poland) Henryk Kempny	Legia Warsaw
1957	19 goals	(Poland) Lucjan Brychczy	Legia Warsaw
1958	19 goals	(Poland) Władysław Soporek	ŁKS Łódź
1959	21 goals	(Poland) Jan Liberda (Poland) Ernst Pohl	Polonia Bytom; Górnik Zabrze
1960	17 goals	(Poland) Marian Norkowski	Polonia Bydgoszcz
1961	24 goals	(Poland) Ernst Pohl	Górnik Zabrze
1962	16 goals	(Poland) Jan Liberda	Polonia Bytom
1963	18 goals	(Poland) Marian Kielec	Pogoń Szczecin
1964	18 goals	(Poland) Lucjan Brychczy (Poland) Józef Gałeczka (Poland) Jerzy Wilim	Legia Warsaw; Zagłębie Sosnowiec; Szombierki Bytom
1965	18 goals	(Poland) Lucjan Brychczy	Legia Warsaw
1966	23 goals	(Poland) Włodzimierz Lubański	Górnik Zabrze
1967	18 goals	(Poland) Włodzimierz Lubański	Górnik Zabrze
1968	24 goals	(Poland) Włodzimierz Lubański	Górnik Zabrze
1969	22 goals	(Poland) Włodzimierz Lubański	Górnik Zabrze
1970	18 goals	(Poland) Andrzej Jarosik	Zagłębie Sosnowiec
1971	13 goals	(Poland) Andrzej Jarosik	Zagłębie Sosnowiec
1972	16 goals	(Poland) Ryszard Szymczak	Gwardia Warsaw
1973	13 goals	(Poland) Grzegorz Lato	Stal Mielec
1974	15 goals	(Poland) Zdzisław Kapka	Wisła Kraków
1975	19 goals	(Poland) Grzegorz Lato	Stal Mielec
1976	20 goals	(Poland) Kazimierz Kmiecik	Wisła Kraków
1977	17 goals	(Poland) Włodzimierz Mazur	Zagłębie Sosnowiec
1978	15 goals	(Poland) Kazimierz Kmiecik	Wisła Kraków
1979	17 goals	(Poland) Kazimierz Kmiecik	Wisła Kraków
1980	24 goals	(Poland) Kazimierz Kmiecik	Wisła Kraków
1981	18 goals	(Poland) Krzysztof Adamczyk	Legia Warsaw
1982	15 goals	(Poland) Grzegorz Kapica	Szombierki Bytom
1983	15 goals	(Poland) Mirosław Okoński (Poland) Mirosław Tłokiński	Lech Poznań; Widzew Łódź
1984	14 goals	(Poland) Włodzimierz Ciołek	Górnik Wałbrzych
1985	14 goals	(Poland) Leszek Iwanicki	Motor Lublin
1986	20 goals	(Poland) Andrzej Zgutczyński	Górnik Zabrze
1987	24 goals	(Poland) Marek Leśniak	Pogoń Szczecin
1988	20 goals	(Poland) Dariusz Dziekanowski	Legia Warsaw
1989	24 goals	(Poland) Krzysztof Warzycha	Ruch Chorzów
1990	18 goals	(Poland) Andrzej Juskowiak	Lech Poznań
1991	21 goals	(Poland) Tomasz Dziubiński	Wisła Kraków
1992	20 goals	(Poland) Jerzy Podbrożny (Poland) Mirosław Waligóra	Lech Poznań; Hutnik Kraków
1993	25 goals	(Poland) Jerzy Podbrożny	Lech Poznań
1994	21 goals	(Poland) Zenon Burzawa	Sokół Pniewy
1995	16 goals	(Poland) Bogusław Cygan	Stal Mielec
1996	29 goals	(Poland) Marek Koniarek	Widzew Łódź
1997	18 goals	(Poland) Mirosław Trzeciak	ŁKS Łódź
1998	14 goals	(Poland) Arkadiusz Bąk (Poland) Sylwester Czereszewski (Poland) Mariusz Śrutwa	Polonia Warsaw; Legia Warsaw; Ruch Chorzów
1999	21 goals	(Poland) Tomasz Frankowski	Wisła Kraków
2000	19 goals	(Poland) Adam Kompała	Górnik Zabrze
2001	18 goals	(Poland) Tomasz Frankowski	Wisła Kraków
2002	21 goals	(Poland) Maciej Żurawski	Wisła Kraków
2003	24 goals	(Serbia and Montenegro) Stanko Svitlica	Legia Warsaw
2004	20 goals	(Poland) Maciej Żurawski	Wisła Kraków
2005	25 goals	(Poland) Tomasz Frankowski	Wisła Kraków
2006	21 goals	(Poland) Grzegorz Piechna	Korona Kielce
2007	15 goals	(Poland) Piotr Reiss	Lech Poznań
2008	23 goals	(Poland) Paweł Brożek	Wisła Kraków
2009	19 goals	(Poland) Paweł Brożek (Zimbabwe) Takesure Chinyama	Wisła Kraków; Legia Warsaw
2010	18 goals	(Poland) Robert Lewandowski	Lech Poznań
2011	14 goals	(Poland) Tomasz Frankowski	Jagiellonia Białystok
2012	22 goals	(Latvia) (Russia) Artjoms Rudņevs	Lech Poznań
2013	14 goals	(Slovakia) Róbert Demjan	Podbeskidzie Bielsko-Biała
2014	22 goals	(Poland) Marcin Robak	Piast Gliwice; Pogoń Szczecin
2015	20 goals	(Poland) Kamil Wilczek	Piast Gliwice
2016	28 goals	(Hungary) (Serbia) Nemanja Nikolić	Legia Warsaw
2017	18 goals	(Portugal) Marco Paixão (Poland) Marcin Robak	Lechia Gdańsk; Lech Poznań
2018	24 goals	(Spain) Carlitos	Wisła Kraków
2019	24 goals	(Spain) Igor Angulo	Górnik Zabrze
2020	24 goals	(Denmark) Christian Gytkjær	Lech Poznań
2021	22 goals	(Czech Republic) Tomáš Pekhart	Legia Warsaw
2022	20 goals	(Spain) Ivi López	Raków Częstochowa
2023	16 goals	(Spain) Marc Gual	Jagiellonia Białystok
2024	19 goals	(Spain) Erik Expósito	Śląsk Wrocław
2025	28 goals	(Greece) Efthymis Koulouris	Pogoń Szczecin
2025	20 goals	(Slovakia) Tomáš Bobček	Lechia Gdańsk

== Records ==
=== All-time most appearances ===
Rank	Player	Apps	Years	Club(s)
1	Łukasz Surma	559	1996–2007, 2009–2017	Wisła Kraków 50, Ruch Chorzów 261, Legia Warsaw 123, Lechia Gdańsk 125
2	Marcin Malinowski	458	1997–2015	Odra Wodzisław 303, Ruch Chorzów 155
3	Marek Chojnacki	452	1978–1988, 1990–1996	ŁKS Łódź
4	Arkadiusz Głowacki	435	1997–2010, 2012–2018	Lech Poznań 75, Wisła Kraków 360
5	Łukasz Trałka	431	2004–2022	Pogoń Szczecin 38, ŁKS Łódź 8, Lechia Gdańsk 16, Polonia Warsaw 92, Lech Poznań 217, Warta Poznań 60
6	Dariusz Gęsior	427	1988–2006	Ruch Chorzów 178, Widzew Łódź 103, Pogoń Szczecin 33, Amica Wronki 37, Wisła Płock 63, Dyskobolia Grodzisk 13
7	Łukasz Madej	417	1999–2017	ŁKS Łódź 75, Ruch Chorzów 26, Lech Poznań 63, Górnik Łęczna 17, Śląsk Wrocław 111, GKS Bełchatów 24, Górnik Zabrze 101
8	Janusz Jojko	416	1980–1998, 2003	Ruch Chorzów 116, GKS Katowice 276, KSZO Ostrowiec Św. 24
8	Marek Zieńczuk	416	2000–2016	Amica Wronki 122, Wisła Kraków 132, Lechia Gdańsk 3, Ruch Chorzów 159
10	**Rafał Janicki**	411	2010–	Lechia Gdańsk 176, Lech Poznań 45, Wisła Kraków 38, Podbeskidzie Bielsko-Biała 13, Górnik Zabrze 139
As of 23 May 2026. Source: Klub 300 (**Bold** denotes players still playing in the Ekstraklasa)

=== All-time top goalscorers ===
Rank	Player	Goals	Years	Club(s)
1	Ernest Pohl	186	1954–1967	CWKS Warsaw 43, Górnik Zabrze 143
2	Lucjan Brychczy	182	1954–1971	Legia Warsaw
3	Gerard Cieślik	168	1948–1959	Ruch Chorzów
4	Tomasz Frankowski	167	1992–2013	Jagiellonia Białystok 52, Wisła Kraków 115
5	Teodor Peterek	157	1928–1948	Ruch Chorzów
6	Włodzimierz Lubański	155	1963–1975	Górnik Zabrze
7	Kazimierz Kmiecik	153	1968–1982	Wisła Kraków
8	Paweł Brożek	149	2001–2020	Wisła Kraków 144, GKS Katowice 5
9	Jan Liberda	146	1953–1969	Polonia Bytom
10	Teodor Anioła	138	1948–1961	Lech Poznań
As of 15 August 2023. Source: Klub 100 (**Bold** denotes players still playing in the Ekstraklasa)

=== All-time most appearances by foreign players ===
Rank	Player	Apps	Years	Club(s)
1	(Ukraine) (Poland) **Taras Romanczuk**	361	2014–	Jagiellonia Białystok
2	(Slovakia) Dušan Kuciak	328	2011–2015, 2017–2024	Legia Warsaw 131, Lechia Gdańsk 196, Raków Częstochowa 1
3	(Portugal) Flávio Paixão	310	2014–2023	Śląsk Wrocław 71, Lechia Gdańsk 239
4	(Serbia) (Poland) Miroslav Radović	276	2006–2014, 2016–2019	Legia Warsaw
5	(Slovakia) Róbert Pich	270	2014–2023	Śląsk Wrocław 253, Legia Warsaw 17
6	(Spain) **Jesús Imaz**	269	2017–	Wisła Kraków 47, Jagiellonia Białystok 222
7	(Slovakia) **František Plach**	245	2018–	Piast Gliwice
8	(Slovakia) Pavol Staňo	243	2007–2016	Polonia Bytom 17, Jagiellonia Białystok 43, Korona Kielce 121, Podbeskidzie 26, Termalica Bruk-Bet 26
9	(Serbia) (Poland) Aleksandar Vuković	242	2001–2013	Legia Warsaw 166, Korona Kielce 76
9	(Armenia) (Poland) Vahan Gevorgyan	236	1999–2009, 2013–2014	Wisła Płock 162, Jagiellonia Białystok 18, ŁKS Łódź 19, Zawisza Bydgoszcz 37
9	(Bosnia and Herzegovina) (Poland) Vlastimir Jovanović	236	2010–2018, 2021	Korona Kielce 176, Bruk-Bet Termalica 60
(**Bold** denotes players still playing in the Ekstraklasa, italics denotes players who later represented Poland internationally); As of 23 May 2026. Source: link.

=== All-time top foreign goalscorers ===
Rank	Player	Goals	Years	Club(s)
1	(Spain) **Jesús Imaz**	110	2017–	Wisła Kraków 14, Jagiellonia Białystok 96
2	(Portugal) Flávio Paixão	108	2014–2023	Śląsk Wrocław 24, Lechia Gdańsk 84
3	(Sweden) **Mikael Ishak**	89	2020–	Lech Poznań
4	(Serbia) (Poland) Miroslav Radović	66	2006–2014, 2016–2019	Legia Warsaw
5	(Spain) Igor Angulo	62	2017–2020	Górnik Zabrze
6	(Portugal) Marco Paixão	61	2013–2018	Śląsk Wrocław 27, Lechia Gdańsk 34
7	(Denmark) Christian Gytkjær	55	2017–2020	Lech Poznań
8	(Spain) Erik Expósito	54	2020–2024	Śląsk Wrocław
8	(Finland) Kasper Hämäläinen	54	2013–2019	Lech Poznań 33, Legia Warsaw 21
10	(Slovakia) Róbert Pich	52	2014–2023	Śląsk Wrocław
(**Bold** denotes players still playing in the Ekstraklasa); As of 23 May 2026. Source: link.

=== Transfer records ===
==== Incoming transfers ====
Rank	Player	From	To	Fee (€ million)	Year	Ref
1	(Ghana) Osman Bukari	(United States) Austin FC	Widzew Łódź	€5.5	2026	
2	(Poland) Przemysław Wiśniewski	(Italy) Spezia	Widzew Łódź	€3.1	2026	
3	(Denmark) Mileta Rajović	(England) Watford	Legia Warsaw	€3	2025	
4	(Denmark) Emil Kornvig	(Norway) Brann	Widzew Łódź	€2.4	2026	
5	(Portugal) Rúben Vinagre	(Portugal) Sporting CP	Legia Warsaw	€2.3	2025	
5	(Ivory Coast) Yannick Agnero	(Sweden) Halmstad	Lech Poznań	€2.3	2025	
7	(England) Sam Greenwood	(England) Leeds United	Pogoń Szczecin	€2	2025	
7	(Democratic Republic of the Congo) Steve Kapuadi	Legia Warsaw	Widzew Łódź	€2	2026	
9	(Switzerland) Andi Zeqiri	(Belgium) Genk	Widzew Łódź	<€2	2025	
10	(Iran) Ali Gholizadeh	(Belgium) Charleroi	Lech Poznań	€1.8	2023	
10	(Sweden) Patrik Wålemark	(Netherlands) Feyenoord	Lech Poznań	€1.8	2025	

==== Outgoing transfers ====
Rank	Player	From	To	Fee (€ million)	Year	Ref
1	(Poland) Jakub Moder	Lech Poznań	(England) Brighton & Hove Albion	€11	2020	
1	(Poland) Kacper Kozłowski	Pogoń Szczecin	(England) Brighton & Hove Albion	€11	2022	
1	(Croatia) Ante Crnac	Raków Częstochowa	(England) Norwich City	€11	2024	
4	(Poland) Jakub Kamiński	Lech Poznań	(Germany) VfL Wolfsburg	€10	2022	
4	(Albania) Ernest Muçi	Legia Warsaw	(Turkey) Beşiktaş	€10	2024	
4	(Poland) Oskar Pietuszewski	Jagiellonia Białystok	(Portugal) Porto	€10	2026	
7	(Poland) Radosław Majecki	Legia Warsaw	(France) AS Monaco	€7	2020	
8	(Poland) Jan Ziółkowski	Legia Warsaw	(Italy) Roma	€6.6	2025	
9	(Poland) Jan Bednarek	Lech Poznań	(England) Southampton	€6	2017	
9	(Poland) Kamil Piątkowski	Raków Częstochowa	(Austria) Red Bull Salzburg	€6	2021	
9	(Poland) Michał Skóraś	Lech Poznań	(Belgium) Club Brugge	€6	2023	
9	(Poland) Maxi Oyedele	Legia Warsaw	(France) Strasbourg	€6	2025	

== League presidents ==
Nr.	League President	Term	
Nr.	League President	from	to
1.	Roman Górecki	1 March 1927	January 1929
2.	Ignacy Izdebski	January 1929	16 January 1933
3.	Zygmunt Żołędziowski	16 January 1933	17 January 1936
4.	Juliusz Geib	17 January 1936	30 August 1936
5.	Michał Jaroszyński	30 August 1936	Fall 1938
6.	Karol Stefan Rudolf	Fall 1938	17 September 1939
7.	Tadeusz Dręgiewicz	10 August 1946	18 August 1946
-	League Suspended	18 August 1946	22 February 1947
-	VP PZPN for League	22 February 1947	14 June 2005
8.	Michał Tomczak	14 June 2005	29 November 2005
9.	Andrzej Rusko	29 November 2005	14 March 2012
10.	Bogusław Biszof	1 September 2012	30 June 2015
11.	Dariusz Marzec	1 July 2015	9 October 2017
12.	Marcin Animucki	9 October 2017	present

== 2003–2005 match-fixing scandal ==
Despite match-fixing becoming punishable by law in mid-2003, several clubs were still involved in the process in the following months. They were later penalized:

- Arka Gdynia – a one-tier relegation, a five-point deduction at the start of the 2007–08 season.
- Cracovia – a five-point deduction at the start of the 2020–21 season and a 1,000,000 PLN fine.
- Górnik Łęczna – a two-tier relegation, a six-point deduction at the start of the 2007–08 season.
- Górnik Polkowice – a two-tier relegation, a six-point deduction at the start of the 2007–08 season and a 70,000 PLN fine.
- Korona Kielce – a one-tier relegation.
- Jagiellonia Białystok – a ten-point deduction at the start of 2009–10 season and a 300,000 PLN fine.
- KSZO Ostrowiec Świętokrzyski – a one-tier relegation, a six-point deduction at the start of the 2007–08 season.
- Zagłębie Lubin – a one-tier relegation.
- Zagłębie Sosnowiec – a one-tier relegation.

== Statistics ==
=== UEFA coefficients ===
The following data indicates Polish coefficient rankings between European football leagues.

Country ranking

UEFA League Ranking for the 2021–2026 period:

- 10. (9) (Czech Republic) Czech First League (48.525)
- 11. (12) Super League Greece (48.412)
- 12. (15) (Poland) Ekstraklasa (46.750)
- 13. (16) (Denmark) Danish Superliga (42.106)
- 14. (11) (Norway) Eliteserien (41.237)

Club ranking

UEFA 5-year Club Ranking for the 2021–2026 period:

- 68. Legia Warsaw (32.500)
- 81. Lech Poznań (27.250)
- 91. Raków Częstochowa (22.250)
- 93. Jagiellonia Białystok (22.000)
- 186. Wisła Kraków (9.350)
- 187. Śląsk Wrocław (9.350)
- 188. Pogoń Szczecin (9.350)
- 189. Lechia Gdańsk (9.350)

== Media coverage ==
Since 1994, Ekstraklasa broadcast rights have been held by Canal+ Poland, with several other broadcasters presenting select games over the years. In 2022, Canal+ renewed their rights through 2027 in a deal worth 1.4 billion PLN. On 17 July 2024, TVP Sport announced they have acquired a sublicense to show one game per week until the end of the 2026–27 season.

== See also ==
- Football in Poland
- List of foreign Ekstraklasa players
- List of Polish football champions
- List of sports attendance figures
