= Jan Liberda =

Polish footballer (1936–2020)

Personal information
- Full name: Jan Konrad Liberda
- Date of birth: 26 November 1936
- Place of birth: Beuthen, Germany (now Bytom, Poland)
- Date of death: 6 February 2020 (aged 83)
- Place of death: Bytom, Poland
- Position: Striker

Youth career
- 1949–1950: Budowlani Chorzów
- 1950–1954: Polonia Bytom

Senior career*
Years	Team	Apps	(Gls)
1954–1969	Polonia Bytom	301	(145)
1969	A.A.C. Eagles		
1969–1971	AZ	42	(1)
1971	Polonia Bytom	3	(1)
1971	GKS Katowice		

International career
- Poland U18
- Poland U23
1959–1967	Poland	35	(8)

Managerial career
- 1973: Zagłębie Sosnowiec
- 1974: Zagłębie Sosnowiec
- CKS Czeladź
- 1977–1978: TuS Schloß Neuhaus
- 1980–1982: Polonia Bytom
- 1982–1983: TuS Schloß Neuhaus
- 1983–1984: VfB Oldenburg
- 1991: Polonia Bytom
- * Club domestic league appearances and goals

Jan Konrad Liberda (26 November 1936 – 6 February 2020) was a Polish footballer who played as a forward. Liberda played mostly for one team, Polonia Bytom, where he remained since 1950, until 1969. He ended his career in 1971 at AZ. He was twice the top scorer of the Ekstraklasa, in 1959 with 21 goals, and in 1962 with 16 goals. Also, in 1962, he won championship of Poland. All together, Liberda played in 304 of Polonia's games, scoring 146 goals.

Liberda 35 times capped for Poland, scoring 8 goals. He debuted on 20 May 1959 in Hamburg, in a 1–1 draw with West Germany.

He later managed TuS Schloß Neuhaus.

He died in February 2020 at the age of 83.

== Honours ==
Polonia Bytom

- Ekstraklasa: 1954, 1962

Individual

- Ekstraklasa top scorer: 1959, 1962
