= Arkonia Szczecin =

- Full name: Klub Sportowy Arkonia Szczecin
- Founded: 1946
- Ground: Stadion Arkonii Szczecin
- League: Klasa okręgowa
- 2021–22: 4th
- Website: https://www.arkonia.szczecin.pl/
Home colours

Arkonia Szczecin is a Polish sports club with football and water polo sections based in Szczecin. The water polo team competes in the Ekstraklasa, Poland's top division, and with 13 Polish Championships is one of the most accomplished water polo clubs in Poland. The football team competes in the lower divisions, although it played in the Polish top division in the past.

== History ==
Its origins date back to June 1945, when the Milicyjny Klub Sportowy (Milicja Sports Club) was established in Koszalin by Stanisław Fortuński and other sports enthusiasts. First football game in post-war Koszalin took place on 6 June 1945. It featured a team of Red Army soldiers, against Milicja Sports Club; the Soviets won 5:3.

In February 1946, when the regional government of Western Pomerania (northwestern Poland) was transferred from Koszalin to Szczecin, the team was also moved, and renamed into Milicyjny Klub Sportowy Szczecin ("Milicja Sports Club Szczecin"). In 1947–1956, the club went through several changes, with different names, such as Gwardia and Chrobry. Finally, after a merger with Stoczniowiec (the team supported by local shipyard), its official name was Stoczniowo-Gwardyjski Klub Sportowy "ARKONIA" Szczecin. This name remained in use until 1971.

In its heyday (1960s, 1970s), Arkonia had as many as 15 departments, with several top national athletes. The organization was famous for its football team, which in the early 1960s played in the Ekstraklasa, waterpolo team, swimmers, boxers and cyclists. Since 1971, several departments were transferred to other organizations, such as volleyball, which was taken over by Gryf Szczecin, and fencing, transferred to Włókniarz Szczecin. Currently, Arkonia has only two departments, water polo and football.

== Trophies ==
- Polish Water Polo Championships (13): 1966, 1967, 1968, 1969, 1970, 1971, 1974, 1975, 1976, 1979, 2008, 2012, 2016
- Polish Water Polo Cups (3): 2008, 2012, 2016
