= Jerzy Wilim =

Polish footballer

Personal information
- Full name: Jerzy Antoni Wilim
- Date of birth: 14 August 1941
- Place of birth: Chorzów, Poland
- Date of death: 7 December 2014 (aged 73)
- Place of death: Gladbeck, Germany
- Height: 1.73 m (5 ft 8 in)
- Position: Striker

Senior career*
| Years | Team | Apps | (Gls) |
| 1952–1970 | Szombierki Bytom | | |
| 1970–1972 | Górnik Zabrze | | |
| 1972–1973 | Telstar | | |
| 1974 | Szombierki Bytom | | |
| 1975 | Niwka Sosnowiec | | |
| 1976–1977 | Rennes | | |
| 1977–1979 | Niwka Sosnowiec | | |
| 1982–1984 | Niwka Sosnowiec | | |

International career
| 1963–1969 | Poland | 8 | (4) |
- * Club domestic league appearances and goals

Jerzy Antoni Wilim (14 August 1941 – 7 December 2014) was a Polish footballer who played as a striker. He spent most of his career with Szombierki Bytom, and also played for clubs such as Górnik Zabrze and Rennes. Wilim made eight appearances for the Poland national team from 1963 to 1969.

== Honours ==
Górnik Zabrze

- Ekstraklasa: 1970–71, 1971–72
- Polish Cup: 1970–71

Individual

- Ekstraklasa top scorer: 1963–64
