= Gwardia Warsaw =

Polish sports club

Gwardia Warszawa
- Full name: Warszawski Klub Sportowy; Gwardia Warszawa
- Nickname: Harpagony
- Founded: 1948
- Dissolved: 2018
- Ground: Stadion "WKS" Gwardia
- Capacity: 9,000
- 2017–18: Klasa A, 12th of 14 (dissolved after the season)

WKS Gwardia Warszawa (Polish pronunciation: [ˈɡvar.dja varˈʂa.va]) was a Polish sports club based in Warsaw. The club was founded in 1948 before being dissolved in 2018.

== Football ==
The club participated in the Polish 1st League from 1953 to 1960 (8 seasons), 1962–1966 (5 seasons), 1967–1968, 1969–1975, 1978–1979 and 1981–1983. The biggest success was finishing 2nd in the Polish Championship in the 1957 season. Gwardia was the first club in the history of Polish football to take part in the European Cup in the 1955–56 season.

== Gymnastics ==
Gymnast Jan Jankowicz, who competed at the 1964 Summer Olympics, was a member of the gymnastics club.

== Gwardia Warszawa football team in Europe ==
Season	Competition	Round		Club	Score
1955–56	European Cup	1R	(Sweden)	Djurgården	0–0, 1–4
1957–58	European Cup	Q	(East Germany)	Wismut Aue	3–1, 1–3, 1–1 (Wismut advance by draw)
1969–70	Inter-Cities Fairs Cup	1R	(Socialist Federal Republic of Yugoslavia)	Vojvodina	1–1, 1–0
		2R	(Scotland)	Dunfermline Athletic	1–2, 0–1
1973–74	UEFA Cup	1R	(Hungary)	Ferencvárosi	1–0, 2–1
		2R	(Netherlands)	Feyenoord Rotterdam	1–3, 1–0
1974–75	UEFA Cup Winners' Cup	1R	(Italy)	Bologna	2–1, 1–2, penalties 5–3 for Gwardia
		2R	(Netherlands)	PSV Eindhoven	1–5, 0–3

== Football honours ==
- Ekstraklasa
  - Runners-up: 1957
  - Third place: 1959, 1972–73
- Polish Cup
  - Winners: 1953–54
  - Runners-up: 1973–74
- Poland Under-19 Championship:
  - Runners-up: 1960, 1978
- European Cup
  - First round: 1955–56
- European Cup Winners' Cup
  - Second round: 1974–75

== See also ==
- Football in Poland
- List of football teams
- Champions' Cup/League
- UEFA Cup
