= 1949 Wisła Kraków season =

Wisła Kraków
1949 season
- Chairman: Teodor Duda (from 6 February 1949); Tadeusz Orzelski (until 6 February 1949)
- Manager: Josef Kuchynka
- Ekstraklasa: 1st
- Top goalscorer: Józef Kohut (16 goals)

The 1949 season was Wisła Kraków's 41st year as a club. Wisła was under the name of Gwardia-Wisła Kraków.

== Friendlies ==
20 February 1949	Gwardia Kielce (Poland)	3–4	(Poland) Gwardia-Wisła Kraków	Kielce, Poland
	Machel; Jung	Report	Gracz; Kohut; Mamoń; Rupa

27 February 1949	Fablok Chrzanów (Poland)	0–12	(Poland) Gwardia-Wisła Kraków	Chrzanów, Poland
		Report	Kohut; Gracz; Mamoń

13 March 1949	Skra Częstochowa (Poland)	1–9	(Poland) Gwardia-Wisła Kraków	Częstochowa, Poland
	Halkiewicz	Report	Kohut; Rupa; Gracz; Mamoń	Attendance: 2,000

18 April 1949	Gwardia-Wisła Kraków (Poland)	1–1	(Czechoslovakia) AFK Bohemians Prague	Kraków, Poland
17:00 CEST (UTC+2)	Kohut ??'	Report	Pešek 18'	Stadium: Stadion Wisły; Attendance: 20,000; Referee: Władysław Michalik (Kraków)

1 May 1949	Miechów (Poland)	3–3	(Poland) Gwardia-Wisła Kraków	Miechów, Poland
	Żurek; Nastarowski; Michalski (pen.)	Report	Tomara; Gamaj; Czech	Attendance: 2,000

3 May 1949	Skra Częstochowa (Poland)	4–4	(Poland) Gwardia-Wisła Kraków	Częstochowa, Poland
	Garus; Wójcikowski (pen.); Halkiewicz; Snopkowski (o.g.)	Report	Dudek; Szczurek (pen.); Wapiennik; Kotaba	Attendance: 5,000

7 May 1949	Repr. Zagłębia Dąbrowskiego (Poland)	5–1	(Poland) Gwardia-Wisła Kraków	Sosnowiec, Poland
	Glimza; Olszewski; Grządziel	Report	Szczurek

6 June 1949	Gwardia-Wisła Kraków (Poland)	5–3	(Czechoslovakia) Bratrství Sparta Prague	Kraków, Poland
	Kohut 30', 37', 58', 71'; Cisowski 41'	Report	Kuchler 5'; Kokštejn 76'; Zmatlík 83' (pen.), (red card) 85'	Stadium: Stadion Wisły; Attendance: 15,000; Referee: Franciszek Bartyzel (Kraków)

12 July 1949	Spójnia Olsztyn (Poland)	2–2	(Poland) Gwardia-Wisła Kraków	Olsztyn, Poland
		Report

7 August 1949	Gwardia Kalisz (Poland)	1–3	(Poland) Gwardia-Wisła Kraków	Kalisz, Poland
		Report

21 August 1949	Stal Gliwice (Poland)	0–3	(Poland) Gwardia-Wisła Kraków	Gliwice, Poland
		Report	Cisowski; Rupa; Kohut	Attendance: 6,000

11 September 1949	Nowy Targ (Poland)	1–5	(Poland) Gwardia-Wisła Kraków	Zakopane, Poland
		Report

September 1949	Bielsko (Poland)	3–5	(Poland) Gwardia-Wisła Kraków	Bielsko, Poland
		Report

2 October 1949	Gwardia-Wisła Kraków (Poland)	4–2	(Poland) Reprezentacja LZS-ów	Kraków, Poland
	Rupa; Jaskowski	Report	Dzierżak; Radwan	Stadium: Stadion Wisły

9 October 1949	Gwardia Katowice (Poland)	1–2	(Poland) Gwardia-Wisła Kraków	Katowice, Poland
	Chachorek	Report	Wohlfeiler; Rogoza

27 November 1949	Gwardia-Wisła Kraków (Poland)	3–2	(Poland) Kolejarz Poznań	Kraków, Poland
	Cisowski 10', 71'; Kohut 68'	Report	Kołtuniak 79'; Anioła 80'	Stadium: Stadion Wisły; Attendance: 7,000; Referee: Stanisław Bartyzel (Kraków)

4 December 1949	Górnik Wałbrzych (Poland)	2–3	(Poland) Gwardia-Wisła Kraków	Wałbrzych, Poland
	Ignaczak	Report	Pawełczyk (o.g.); Gamaj; Kotaba

5 December 1949	Ogniwo Wrocław (Poland)	0–7	(Poland) Gwardia-Wisła Kraków	Wrocław, Poland
		Report	Jaskowski; Kohut; Cisowski; Flanek (pen.)	Attendance: 6,000; Referee: Mikołaj Klepacz (Wrocław)

8 December 1949	Związkowiec Garbarnia Kraków (Poland)	3–2	(Poland) Gwardia-Wisła Kraków	Kraków, Poland
	Bożek (pen.); Derdziński; Nowak	Report	Jaskowski; Giergiel	Attendance: 10,000; Referee: Władysław Pryk (Kraków)

== Ekstraklasa ==
20 March 1949 1	ŁKS Łódź	2–8	Gwardia-Wisła Kraków	Łódź
11:30 CET (UTC+1)	Włodarczyk 18'; Gwoździński 70'	Report	Kohut 12', 75'; Rupa 15', 89'; Gracz 21', 55'; Mamoń 49'; Legutko 87'	Stadium: Stadion ŁKS-u; Attendance: 6,000; Referee: Julian Brzuchowski (Warsaw)

27 March 1949 2	Gwardia-Wisła Kraków	2–0	ZZK Poznań	Kraków
15:30 CET (UTC+1)	Giergiel 40'; Kohut 53'	Report		Stadium: Stadion Wisły; Attendance: 15,000; Referee: Grzegorz Aleksandrowicz (Warsaw)

3 April 1949 3	Polonia Warsaw	0–1	Gwardia-Wisła Kraków	Warsaw
		Report	Kohut 24'	Stadium: Stadion Wojska Polskiego; Attendance: 20,000; Referee: Marian Nalepa (Zabrze)

10 April 1949 4	Gwardia-Wisła Kraków	4–1	Szombierki Bytom	Kraków
17:00 CEST (UTC+2)	Kohut 5'; Gracz 9'; Mamoń 59', 76'	Report	Krasówka 22'	Stadium: Stadion Wisły; Attendance: 15,000; Referee: Kazimierz Bukowski (Radom)

24 April 1949 5	AKS Chorzów	1–2	Gwardia-Wisła Kraków	Chorzów
	Bożek 16'	Report	Kohut 63'; Cisowski 90'	Attendance: 15,000; Referee: Józef Naporski (Łódź)

15 May 1949 6	Gwardia-Wisła Kraków	4–2	Polonia Bytom	Kraków
18:00 CEST (UTC+2)	Giergiel 14', 65'; Gracz 33' (pen.); Mamoń 75'	Report	Trampisz 54', 58'	Stadium: Stadion Wisły; Attendance: 10,000; Referee: Grzegorz Aleksandrowicz (Warsaw)

22 May 1949 7	Gwardia-Wisła Kraków	4–0	Legia Warsaw	Kraków
18:00 CEST (UTC+2)	Kohut 28', 80'; Mamoń 60'; Legutko 82'	Report		Stadium: Stadion Wisły; Attendance: 10,000; Referee: Alfons Żmudziński (Bydgoszcz)

26 May 1949 8	Gwardia-Wisła Kraków	0–1	Ogniwo-Cracovia	Kraków
18:00 CEST (UTC+2)		Report	Radoń 82'	Stadium: Stadion Wisły; Attendance: 25,000; Referee: Kazimierz Bukowski (Radom)

29 May 1949 9	Lechia Gdańsk	1–5	Gwardia-Wisła Kraków	Gdańsk
18:00 CEST (UTC+2)	A. Kokot 18'	Report	Gracz 12', 14', 16', 77'; Kohut 85'	Stadium: Stadion Miejski; Attendance: 20,000; Referee: Grzegorz Aleksandrowicz (Warsaw)

26 June 1949 10	Ruch Chorzów	0–3	Gwardia-Wisła Kraków	Chorzów
		Report	Gracz 1', 31'; Kohut 17'	Stadium: Stadion Ruchu; Attendance: 20,000; Referee: Grzegorz Aleksandrowicz (Warsaw)

3 July 1949 11	Gwardia-Wisła Kraków	1–1	Warta Poznań	Kraków
18:00 CEST (UTC+2)	Cisowski 40'	Report	Smólski 26'	Stadium: Stadion Wisły; Attendance: 10,000; Referee: Józef Naporski (Łódź)

6 August 1949 12	ZZK Poznań	2–1	Gwardia-Wisła Kraków	Poznań
	Czapczyk 44'; Anioła 65'	Report	Cisowski 77'	Attendance: 18,000; Referee: Józef Naporski (Łódź)

13 August 1949 13	Gwardia-Wisła Kraków	5–3	ŁKS Łódź	Kraków
18:30 CEST (UTC+2)	Rupa 4'; Kohut 30', 43'; Mamoń 71'; Gracz 88'	Report	Baran 7', 17', 29'	Stadium: Stadion Wisły; Attendance: 7,000; Referee: Eugeniusz Kuc (Sosnowiec)

28 August 1949 14	Górnik-Szombierki Bytom	2–0	Gwardia-Wisła Kraków	Bytom
	Gaweł 43'; Podeszwa (penalty missed) 44'; Krasówka 53'	Report	Szczurek (red card) 60'	Attendance: 10,000; Referee: Bolesław Gruszczyński (Kościan)

4 September 1949 15	Gwardia-Wisła Kraków	0–3	Kolejarz-Polonia Warsaw	Kraków
17:00 CEST (UTC+2)		Report	Popiołek 10', 22'; Świcarz 85'	Stadium: Stadion Wisły; Attendance: 10,000; Referee: Kazimierz Bukowski (Radom)

15 September 1949 16	Ogniwo-Cracovia	0–0	Gwardia-Wisła Kraków	Kraków
		Report		Stadium: Stadion Cracovii; Attendance: 25,000; Referee: Mikołaj Fomin (Radom)

18 September 1949 17	Gwardia-Wisła Kraków	4–0	Lechia Gdańsk	Kraków
17:00 CEST (UTC+2)	Kohut 4', 22'; Cisowski 18', 86'	Report		Stadium: Stadion Wisły; Attendance: 10,000; Referee: Edward Sperling (Łódź)

25 September 1949 18	Legia Warsaw	0–0	Gwardia-Wisła Kraków	Warsaw
		Report		Stadium: Stadion Wojska Polskiego; Attendance: 15,000; Referee: Józef Naporski (Łódź)

9 October 1949 19	Polonia Bytom	0–2	Gwardia-Wisła Kraków	Bytom
		Report	Jaskowski 67'; Giergiel 86'	Stadium: Stadion Polonii; Attendance: 20,000; Referee: Grzegorz Aleksandrowicz (Warsaw)

16 October 1949 20	Gwardia-Wisła Kraków	3–0	AKS Budowlani Chorzów	Kraków
14:15 CET (UTC+1)	Kohut 8', 63'; Giergiel 87'	Report	Janduda (red card) 58'	Stadium: Stadion Wisły; Attendance: 15,000; Referee: Marian Nalepa (Zabrze)

23 October 1949 21	Gwardia-Wisła Kraków	1–1	Chemik-Ruch Chorzów	Kraków
12:00 CET (UTC+1)	Giergiel 20'	Report	Kubicki 70'	Stadium: Stadion Wisły; Attendance: 20,000; Referee: Julian Brzuchowski (Warsaw)

13 November 1949 22	Warta Poznań	1–0	Gwardia-Wisła Kraków	Poznań
12:00 CET (UTC+1)	Cybiński 78' (pen.)	Report		Stadium: Stadion Warty; Attendance: 5,000; Referee: Julian Brzuchowski (Warsaw)

== Squad, appearances and goals ==
No.	Pos	Nat	Player	Total		Ekstraklasa	
No.	Pos	Nat	Player	Apps	Goals	Apps	Goals
	GK	(Poland) POL	Jerzy Jurowicz	22	0	22+0	0
	GK	(Poland) POL	Antoni Kurkiewicz	1	0	0+1	0
	DF	(Poland) POL	Mieczysław Dudek	18	0	18+0	0
	DF	(Poland) POL	Stanisław Flanek	22	0	22+0	0
	DF	(Poland) POL	Tadeusz Kubik	6	0	6+0	0
	DF	(Poland) POL	Tadeusz Legutko	20	2	20+0	2
	MF	(Poland) POL	Władysław Giergiel	11	6	11+0	6
	MF	(Poland) POL	Zbigniew Kotaba	1	0	1+0	0
	MF	(Poland) POL	Andrzej Łyko	5	0	5+0	0
	MF	(Poland) POL	Leszek Snopkowski	6	0	6+0	0
	MF	(Poland) POL	Mieczysław Szczurek	6	0	6+0	0
	MF	(Poland) POL	Adam Wapiennik	9	0	9+0	0
	MF	(Poland) POL	Jan Wapiennik	18	0	18+0	0
	FW	(Poland) POL	Kazimierz Cisowski	13	5	13+0	5
	FW	(Poland) POL	Mieczysław Gracz	13	11	13+0	11
	FW	(Poland) POL	Zbigniew Jaskowski	9	1	9+0	1
	FW	(Poland) POL	Józef Kohut	22	16	22+0	16
	FW	(Poland) POL	Józef Mamoń	21	6	21+0	6
	FW	(Poland) POL	Mieczysław Rupa	20	3	20+0	3

=== Goalscorers ===
Place	Position	Nation	Name	Ekstraklasa
1	FW	(Poland)	Józef Kohut	16
2	FW	(Poland)	Mieczysław Gracz	11
3	FW	(Poland)	Józef Mamoń	6
3	MF	(Poland)	Władysław Giergiel	6
5	FW	(Poland)	Kazimierz Cisowski	5
6	FW	(Poland)	Mieczysław Rupa	3
7	DF	(Poland)	Tadeusz Legutko	2
8	FW	(Poland)	Zbigniew Jaskowski	1
			TOTALS	50

=== Disciplinary record ===
Name	Nation	Position	Mistrzostwa Polski	Total
Name	Nation	Position	Sent off (straight red)	Sent off (straight red)
Mieczysław Szczurek	(Poland)	MF	1	1
