= 1948 Wisła Kraków season =

Wisła Kraków
1948 season
- Chairman: Tadeusz Orzelski
- Manager: Josef Kuchynka (from 23 May 1948); Adam Walter (until 22 May 1948)
- Ekstraklasa: 2nd
- Top goalscorer: Józef Kohut (31 goals)

The 1948 season was Wisła Kraków's 40th year as a club.

== Friendlies ==
15 February 1948	Podgórze Kraków (Poland)	2–6	(Poland) Wisła Kraków	Kraków, Poland
11:15 CET (UTC+1)	Zaporowski; Jędryga	Report	Kohut; Kapusta

29 February 1948	Wisła Kraków (Poland)	6–0	(Poland) Wieczysta Kraków	Kraków, Poland
11:30 CET (UTC+1)	Kohut; Flanek; Legutko	Report		Stadium: Stadion Wisły; Attendance: 2,000; Referee: Roman Mohyła (Kraków)

6 March 1948	Wisła Kraków (Poland)	12–0	(Poland) Partyzant Kielce	Kraków, Poland
11:30 CET (UTC+1)	Kohut; Rupa; Cisowski; Legutko; Gracz	Report		Stadium: Stadion Wisły; Referee: Zygmunt Chruściński (Kraków)

29 March 1948	Wisła Kraków (Poland)	4–1	(Czechoslovakia) Slovena Žilina	Kraków, Poland
	Rupa 20', 50'; Mamoń 55'; Wandas 84'	Report	Chrupka 31'	Stadium: Stadion Wisły; Attendance: 8,000; Referee: Władysław Michalik (Kraków)

4 April 1948	Wisła Kraków (Poland)	5–1	(Czechoslovakia) SK Nusle	Kraków, Poland
16:00 CET (UTC+1)	Kohut 22', 37', 43', 75'; Rupa 88'	Report	Šťastný 79'	Stadium: Stadion Wisły; Attendance: 6,000; Referee: Franciszek Bartyzel (Kraków)

21 August 1948	Wisła Kraków (Poland)	3–4	(Poland) Orlęta	Kraków, Poland
18:00 CEST (UTC+2)	Kohut 56', 88'; Rupa 59'	Report	Wawrzusiak 8'; Stadler 11', 64'; Boczarski ??'	Stadium: Stadion Wisły; Referee: Witold Gieras (Kraków)

17 October 1948	Wisła Kraków (Poland)	8–1	(Poland) Krakowski Okręg Wojskowy	Kraków, Poland
14:30 CET (UTC+1)	Jaskowski; Rupa; Cisowski; Kotaba; Flanek ? (o.g.)	Report	Dwernicki	Stadium: Stadion Wisły

=== Mixed teams ===
12 December 1948	Garbarnia / KS Cracovia (Poland)	1–0	(Poland) Wisła Kraków / Tarnovia Tarnów	Kraków, Poland
	Poświat 80'	Report		Attendance: 10,000; Referee: Franciszek Bartyzel (Kraków)

== Ekstraklasa ==
=== League matches ===
14 March 1948 1	Wisła Kraków	6–0	Polonia Warsaw	Kraków
15:45 CET (UTC+1)	Gracz 23', 30', 62' (pen.); Wandas 26', 90'; Rupa 46'	Report		Stadium: Stadion Wisły; Attendance: 15,000; Referee: Zygmunt Kowalski (Łódź)

21 March 1948 2	ZZK Poznań	1–1	Wisła Kraków	Poznań
	Polka 21'	Report	Kohut 47'	Attendance: 7,000; Referee: Józef Naporski (Łódź)

11 April 1948 3	AKS Chorzów	2–1	Wisła Kraków	Chorzów
	Barański 3'; Muskała 30'	Report	Kohut 33'	Attendance: 12,000; Referee: Alfred Nowakowski (Warsaw)

25 April 1948 4	Wisła Kraków	5–0	Polonia Bytom	Kraków
17:00 CEST (UTC+2)	Rupa 15'; Kohut 35', 47', 69'; Gracz (penalty missed) 37', 66'	Report		Stadium: Stadion Wisły; Attendance: 7,000; Referee: Karol Bergtal (Warsaw)

2 May 1948 5	Legia Warsaw	4–1	Wisła Kraków	Warsaw
	Szaflarski 30'; Mordarski 49'; Waśko 62'; Cyganik 67' (pen.)	Report	Gracz 51'	Stadium: Stadion Wojska Polskiego; Attendance: 10,000; Referee: Mieczysław Długosz (Wrocław)

9 May 1948 6	Tarnovia Tarnów	2–1	Wisła Kraków	Tarnów
17:00 CEST (UTC+2)	Streit 15'; W. Roik 67'	Report	Gracz 3'	Stadium: Stadion Tarnovii; Attendance: 6,000; Referee: Bolesław Latosiński (Sosnowiec)

23 May 1948 7	Wisła Kraków	2–7	Rymer Niedobczyce	Kraków
17:00 CEST (UTC+2)	Cisowski 40', (penalty missed) 78'; Flanek (penalty missed) 43'; Kohut 88'	Report	Kurzeja 2', 25'; Pierchała 7', 70'; Franke 66'; Ruda 68'; Dybała 87'	Stadium: Stadion Wisły; Attendance: 8,000; Referee: Alfred Nowakowski (Warsaw)

30 May 1948 8	ŁKS Łódź	0–3	Wisła Kraków	Łódź
		Report	Kohut 12', 55'; Cisowski 85'	Stadium: Stadion ŁKS-u; Attendance: 12,000; Referee: Alfons Żmudziński (Bydgoszcz)

3 June 1948 9	Wisła Kraków	4–0	Garbarnia Kraków	Kraków
18:15 CEST (UTC+2)	Kohut 6', 39'; Gracz 44', 79' (pen.)	Report		Stadium: Stadion Wisły; Attendance: 6,000; Referee: Franciszek Fronczyk (Tarnów)

6 June 1948 10	Wisła Kraków	0–2	KS Cracovia	Kraków
18:15 CEST (UTC+2)		Report	Parpan 18'; S. Różankowski 68'	Stadium: Stadion Wisły; Attendance: 18,000; Referee: Edmund Sperling (Łódź)

20 June 1948 11	Wisła Kraków	5–2	Warta Poznań	Kraków
	Kohut 4'; Cisowski 33'; Rupa 57'; Gracz 64'; Mamoń 82'	Report	Czapczyk 58'; Kaźmierczak 69' (pen.)	Stadium: Stadion Wisły; Attendance: 7,000; Referee: Eugeniusz Kuc (Sosnowiec)

4 July 1948 12	Ruch Chorzów	1–1	Wisła Kraków	Chorzów
	Cieślik 53'	Report	Cisowski 20'	Attendance: 25,000; Referee: Edward Sperling (Łódź)

11 July 1948 13	Wisła Kraków	8–0	Widzew Łódź	Kraków
	Kohut 23', 29', 34'; Gracz 24', 31', 41', 82' (pen.); Rupa 33'; Cisowski (penalty missed) 56'	Report		Stadium: Stadion Wisły; Attendance: 4,000; Referee: Bolesław Latosiński (Sosnowiec)

1 August 1948 14	Polonia Bytom	2–4	Wisła Kraków	Bytom
	Matyas 8' (pen.); Kulawik 83'	Report	Gracz 7', 55'; Kohut 44', 49'	Attendance: 6,000; Referee: Bolesław Latosiński (Sosnowiec)

8 August 1948 15	Wisła Kraków	8–0	Legia Warsaw	Kraków
18:00 CEST (UTC+2)	Kohut 1', 24', 85'; Knys 40' (o.g.); Gracz 47', 69', 78'; Legutko 72'	Report		Stadium: Stadion Wisły; Attendance: 8,000; Referee: Władysław Przybysz (Bydgoszcz)

15 August 1948 16	Wisła Kraków	6–1	Tarnovia Tarnów	Kraków
18:00 CEST (UTC+2)	R. Pyrich 17' (o.g.); Kohut 22', 55', 70'; Gracz 34'; Mamoń 78'	Report	Binek 1'	Stadium: Stadion Wisły; Attendance: 8,000; Referee: Mieczysław Długosz (Wrocław)

29 August 1948 17	Polonia Warsaw	0–5	Wisła Kraków	Warsaw
		Report	Mamoń 56'; Kohut 63', 70', 80'; Gracz 75' (pen.)	Stadium: Stadion Wojska Polskiego; Attendance: 12,000; Referee: Edmund Sperling (Łódź)

5 September 1948 18	Wisła Kraków	2–1	ZZK Poznań	Kraków
16:30 CEST (UTC+2)	Cisowski 75'; Kohut 78'	Report	Gogolewski 81'	Stadium: Stadion Wisły; Attendance: 10,000; Referee: Julian Brzuchowski (Warsaw)

9 September 1948 19	Garbarnia Kraków	1–3	Wisła Kraków	Kraków
	Rakoczy ??' (pen.)	Report	Gracz 8'; Mamoń 14'; Kohut 68'	Attendance: 7,000; Referee: Władysław Michalik (Kraków)

26 September 1948 20	Wisła Kraków	3–1	Ruch Chorzów	Kraków
16:00 CEST (UTC+2)	Gracz 28', 65'; Mamoń 78'	Report	Przecherka 54'	Stadium: Stadion Wisły; Attendance: 20,000; Referee: Roman Dabert (Poznań)

24 October 1948 21	Warta Poznań	2–3	Wisła Kraków	Poznań
	Smólski 7'; Opitz 18'	Report	Kohut 4'; Mamoń 26', 31'	Stadium: Stadion Warty; Attendance: 8,000; Referee: Eugeniusz Kuc (Sosnowiec)

1 November 1948 22	KS Cracovia	1–1	Wisła Kraków	Kraków
11:30 CET (UTC+1)	Jabłoński (penalty missed) 56'; E. Różankowski 66'	Report	Kohut 54'	Stadium: Stadion Cracovii; Attendance: 26,000; Referee: Władysław Przybysz (Bydgoszcz)

7 November 1948 23	Wisła Kraków	4–0	AKS Chorzów	Kraków
11:00 CET (UTC+1)	Gracz 51', 63'; Cisowski 58'; Mamoń 80'	Report		Stadium: Stadion Wisły; Attendance: 20,000; Referee: Z. Stachiewicz (Toruń)

14 November 1948 24	Wisła Kraków	5–1	ŁKS Łódź	Kraków
11:45 CET (UTC+1)	Kohut 23', 62'; Mamoń 33', 43'; Gracz 47'	Report	Hogendorf 78'	Stadium: Stadion Wisły; Attendance: 12,000; Referee: Julian Brzuchowski (Warsaw)

21 November 1948 25	Widzew Łódź	2–2	Wisła Kraków	Łódź
	Fornalczyk 2'; Okupiński (penalty missed) 27'; Cichocki 65'	Report	Mamoń 85'; Gracz 86' (pen.)	Attendance: 5,000; Referee: Grzegorz Aleksandrowicz (Warsaw)

28 November 1948 26	Rymer Niedobczyce	1–2	Wisła Kraków	Rybnik
	Ruda 62'	Report	Mamoń 30'; Gracz 86'	Attendance: 3,000; Referee: Józef Naporski (Łódź)

=== Final ===
5 December 1948 Final	KS Cracovia	3–1	Wisła Kraków	Kraków
11:00 CET (UTC+1)	Różankowski 44', 74'; Strąk 45'	Report	Legutko 1'	Stadium: Stadion Garbarni; Attendance: 20,000; Referee: Julian Brzuchowski (Warsaw)

== Squad, appearances and goals ==
No.	Pos	Nat	Player	Total		Ekstraklasa	
No.	Pos	Nat	Player	Apps	Goals	Apps	Goals
	GK	(Poland) POL	Jerzy Jurowicz	26	0	26+0	0
	GK	(Poland) POL	Przemysław Smolarek	2	0	1+1	0
	DF	(Poland) POL	Michał Filek	26	0	26+0	0
	DF	(Poland) POL	Tadeusz Kubik	20	0	20+0	0
	DF	(Poland) POL	Tadeusz Legutko	18	2	18+0	2
	MF	(Poland) POL	Edward Dawidowicz	3	0	3+0	0
	MF	(Poland) POL	Stanisław Flanek	26	0	26+0	0
	MF	(Poland) POL	Władysław Giergiel	4	0	4+0	0
	MF	(Poland) POL	Andrzej Łyko	10	0	10+0	0
	MF	(Poland) POL	Grzegorz Nowak	2	0	2+0	0
	MF	(Poland) POL	Leszek Snopkowski	1	0	1+0	0
	MF	(Poland) POL	Adam Wapiennik	9	0	9+0	0
	MF	(Poland) POL	Jan Wapiennik	22	0	22+0	0
	FW	(Poland) POL	Kazimierz Cisowski	25	6	25+0	6
	FW	(Poland) POL	Mieczysław Gracz	26	28	26+0	28
	FW	(Poland) POL	Zbigniew Jaskowski	4	0	4+0	0
	FW	(Poland) POL	Tadeusz Karzyński	3	0	3+0	0
	FW	(Poland) POL	Józef Kohut	27	31	27+0	31
	FW	(Poland) POL	Józef Mamoń	18	12	18+0	12
	FW	(Poland) POL	Mieczysław Rupa	24	4	24+0	4
	FW	(Poland) POL	Eugeniusz Wandas	2	2	2+0	2

=== Goalscorers ===
Place	Position	Nation	Name	Ekstraklasa
1	FW	(Poland)	Józef Kohut	31
2	FW	(Poland)	Mieczysław Gracz	28
3	MF	(Poland)	Józef Mamoń	12
4	FW	(Poland)	Kazimierz Cisowski	6
5	FW	(Poland)	Mieczysław Rupa	4
6	DF	(Poland)	Tadeusz Legutko	2
6	FW	(Poland)	Eugeniusz Wandas	2
8	DF	(Poland)	Józef Knys	1 (o.g.)
8	DF	(Poland)	Rudolf Pyrich	1 (o.g.)
			Total	87
