= 1950 Wisła Kraków season =

Wisła Kraków
1950 season
- Chairman: Grzegorz Łanin (from 23 February); Teodor Duda (until 23 February)
- Manager: Josef Kuchynka
- Ekstraklasa: 1st
- Top goalscorer: Mieczysław Gracz (12 goals); Józef Kohut (12 goals)

The 1950 season was Wisła Kraków's 42nd year as a club. Wisła was under the name of Gwardia Kraków.

== Friendlies ==
19 February 1950	Gwardia Kielce (Poland)	2–2	(Poland) Gwardia Kraków	Kielce, Poland
	Iwański	Report	Panek; Cisowski	Attendance: 6,000

5 March 1950	Stal Dziedzice (Poland)	4–4	(Poland) Gwardia Kraków	Czechowice-Dziedzice, Poland
	Czyżyk; Mańdok; Obiegła	Report	Kohut; Mamoń; Rupa

5 March 1950	Unia Oświęcim (Poland)	1–1	(Poland) Gwardia Kraków	Oświęcim, Poland
	Kumela (pen.)	Report	Jaskowski

11 March 1950	Gwardia Warsaw (Poland)	1–3	(Poland) Gwardia Kraków	Warsaw, Poland
	Maruszkiewicz (pen.)	Report	Jaskowski; Mamoń	Stadium: Stadion Wojska Polskiego; Attendance: 3,000; Referee: Zdzisław Hasselbusch (Warsaw)

10 April 1950	Gwardia Kraków (Poland)	9–1	(Poland) Gwardia Warsaw	Kraków, Poland
	Gracz 6', 33', 43'; Mamoń 47'; Gamaj 48', 87'; Kohut ??'; Mordarski 61', 89'	Report	Maruszkiewicz 35'	Stadium: Stadion Wisły; Referee: Czesław Popłatek (Kraków)

25 April 1950	ŁKS Włókniarz (Poland)	0–2	(Poland) Gwardia Kraków	Bydgoszcz, Poland
		Report

6 May 1950	Gwardia Kraków (Poland)	6–2	(Poland) Ogniwo Tarnów	Kraków, Poland
	Mordarski 3', 41', ??', ??'; Cisowski 18'; Kotaba ??'; Dudek (penalty missed) ??'	Report	Broda 62'; Pyrich 80'	Stadium: Stadion Wisły; Attendance: 2,500; Referee: Zbigniew Olewski (Kraków)

29 May 1950	Kolejarz Przemyśl (Poland)	2–1	(Poland) Gwardia Kraków	Przemyśl, Poland
	Drzewiński II 24'; Mielniczak 73'	Report	Kotaba 1', (penalty missed) 70'	Stadium: Stadion Czuwaju; Attendance: 5,000

29 May 1950	Gwardia Kraków (Poland)	9–1	(Poland) Stal Sosnowiec	Kraków, Poland
17:15 CET (UTC+1)	Mamoń 17', ??', ??'; Jaskowski 20', ??'; Szczurek ??'; Gracz ??', ??'	Report	Słota 3'	Stadium: Stadion Wisły

22 July 1950	CWKS Warsaw (Poland)	1–2	(Poland) Gwardia Kraków	Warsaw, Poland
	Górski 8'	Report	Cichocki 45'; Mordarski 76'	Stadium: Stadion Wojska Polskiego; Referee: Józef Naporski (Łódź)

15 August 1950	Skra Częstochowa (Poland)	0–3	(Poland) Gwardia Kraków	Częstochowa, Poland
		Report

24 August 1950	Gwardia Kraków (Poland)	8–0	(Poland) WKS Skrzydlaci Świdwin	Kraków, Poland
	Gamaj; Kotaba; Szymborski; Jaskowski	Report		Stadium: Stadion Wisły

22 October 1950	Stal Pafawag Wrocław (Poland)	1–5	(Poland) Gwardia Kraków	Wrocław, Poland
	Krzyszczuk	Report	Rupa; Cisowski; Gamaj; Mamoń

5 November 1950	Gwardia Kraków (Poland)	5–1	(Poland) Kolejarz Poznań	Kraków, Poland
14:15 CET (UTC+1)	Cisowski 4', 30'; Gracz 44', 63'; Mordarski 73'	Report	Gogolewski 40'	Stadium: Stadion Wisły; Attendance: 2,000

26 November 1950	Gwardia Kraków (Poland)	0–1	(Poland) Unia-Ruch Chorzów	Kraków, Poland
11:45 CET (UTC+1)		Report	Kubicki 89'	Stadium: Stadion Wisły; Attendance: 8,000; Referee: Kazimierz Seichter (Kraków)

3 December 1950	Gwardia Szczecin (Poland)	3–6	(Poland) Gwardia Kraków	Szczecin, Poland
		Report	Smolik; Mordarski; Gracz; Mamoń; Szczurek	Attendance: 5,000; Referee: Józef Szlejfer (Szczecin)

== Ekstraklasa ==
19 March 1950 1	Budowlani Chorzów	1–3	Gwardia Kraków	Chorzów
	Muskała 89'	Report	Jaskowski 17', 41'; Kohut 60'	Stadium: Stadion Ruchu; Attendance: 25,000; Referee: Józef Szlejfer (Szczecin)

26 March 1950 2	ŁKS Włókniarz	1–0	Gwardia Kraków	Łódź
	Baran 85'	Report		Stadium: Stadion ŁKS-u; Attendance: 25,000; Referee: Jakub Krumholz (Bielsko)

2 April 1950 3	Gwardia Kraków	3–1	Unia-Ruch Chorzów	Kraków
15:45 CET (UTC+1)	Kohut 35'; Gracz 43', 46'	Report	Kubicki 6'	Stadium: Stadion Wisły; Attendance: 20,000; Referee: Stanisław Gryniewski (Łódź)

16 April 1950 4	Gwardia Kraków	0–2	Górnik Radlin	Kraków
15:45 CET (UTC+1)		Report	Schleger 17' (pen.); Dybała 60'	Stadium: Stadion Wisły; Attendance: 15,000; Referee: Edmund Andrzejak (Łódź)

25 April 1950 5	Górnik Bytom	0–5	Gwardia Kraków	Bytom
		Report	Jaskowski 5', 45'; Gaweł 10' (o.g.); Mamoń 79'; Kohut 88'	Attendance: 8,000; Referee: Jan Grabowski (Sosnowiec)

18 May 1950 6	Gwardia Kraków	2–1	CWKS Warsaw	Kraków
17:30 CET (UTC+1)	Mordarski 55' (pen.); Kohut 74'	Report	Olejnik 69'	Stadium: Stadion Wisły; Attendance: 10,000; Referee: Józef Orliński (Katowice)

21 May 1950 7	Związkowiec-Warta Poznań	0–2	Gwardia Kraków	Poznań
		Report	Gracz 70'; Jaskowski 77'	Stadium: Stadion Warty; Attendance: 6,000; Referee: Zdzisław Hasselbusch (Warsaw)

11 June 1950 8	Związkowiec Kraków	1–0	Gwardia Kraków	Kraków
	Nowak 62'	Report		Attendance: 15,000; Referee: Jakub Krumholz (Bielsko)

22 June 1950 9	Gwardia Kraków	1–0	Ogniwo Kraków	Kraków
17:45 CET (UTC+1)	Mordarski 44'	Report		Stadium: Stadion Wisły; Attendance: 30,000; Referee: Mikołaj Fomin (Radom)

25 June 1950 10	Gwardia Kraków	2–1	Kolejarz Poznań	Kraków
17:45 CET (UTC+1)	Gracz 32', 76'	Report	Wojciechowski 18'	Stadium: Stadion Wisły; Attendance: 15,000; Referee: Józef Orliński (Katowice)

2 July 1950 11	Kolejarz Warsaw	2–1	Gwardia Kraków	Warsaw
	Popiołek 63'; Szularz 76'	Report	Mamoń 78'	Stadium: Stadion Syreny; Attendance: 10,000; Referee: Mikołaj Fomin (Radom)

30 July 1950 12	Kolejarz Poznań	2–3	Gwardia Kraków	Poznań
	Kołtuniak 6'; Słoma 12' (pen.)	Report	Rupa 30'; Mordarski 35'; Cisowski 39'; J. Wapiennik (red card) 49'	Attendance: 10,000; Referee: Marian Nalepa (Zabrze)

5 August 1950 13	Gwardia Kraków	4–0	ŁKS Włókniarz	Kraków
17:30 CET (UTC+1)	Gracz 10'; Kohut 11', 56'; Szczurek 88'	Report		Stadium: Stadion Wisły; Attendance: 10,000; Referee: Jakub Krumholz (Bielsko)

20 August 1950 14	Gwardia Kraków	4–0	Związkowiec-Warta Poznań	Kraków
16:30 CET (UTC+1)	Cisowski 20'; Mordarski 59', 64'; Kohut 86'	Report		Stadium: Stadion Wisły; Attendance: 10,000; Referee: Kazimierz Wilgusiak (Lublin)

27 August 1950 15	Unia-Ruch Chorzów	0–0	Gwardia Kraków	Chorzów
		Report		Attendance: 35,000; Referee: Edward Sperling (Łódź)

5 September 1950 16	Gwardia Kraków	4–1	Górnik Bytom	Kraków
16:15 CET (UTC+1)	Gracz 19'; Kohut 64'; Mamoń 78'; Jaskowski 80'	Report	Sobek ??'	Stadium: Stadion Wisły; Attendance: 5,000; Referee: Franciszek Wilczyński (Poznań)

10 September 1950 17	Ogniwo Kraków	1–3	Gwardia Kraków	Kraków
	Bobula 84'	Report	Mordarski 54'; Kohut 67', 75'	Stadium: Stadion Cracovii; Attendance: 20,000; Referee: Józef Naporski (Łódź)

17 September 1950 18	Gwardia Kraków	7–0	Kolejarz Warsaw	Kraków
15:30 CET (UTC+1)	Mordarski 2', 35'; Gracz 8', 87' (pen.); Kohut 44', 70'; Wołosz 56' (o.g.)	Report		Stadium: Stadion Wisły; Attendance: 12,000; Referee: Jakub Krumholz (Bielsko)

24 September 1950 19	Gwardia Kraków	2–1	Związkowiec Kraków	Kraków
15:30 CET (UTC+1)	Gracz 24', 45'	Report	Parpan 66'	Stadium: Stadion Wisły; Attendance: 12,000; Referee: Kazimierz Bukowski (Radom)

8 October 1950 20	Gwardia Kraków	2–0	AKS Budowlani Chorzów	Kraków
15:00 CET (UTC+1)	Mordarski 30'; Janik 45' (o.g.)	Report		Stadium: Stadion Wisły; Attendance: 12,000; Referee: Leon Losiak (Kościan)

12 November 1950 21	CWKS Warsaw	0–2	Gwardia Kraków	Warsaw
13:00 CET (UTC+1)		Report	Gracz 43'; Jaskowski 70'	Stadium: Stadion Wojska Polskiego; Attendance: 8,000; Referee: Mikołaj Fomin (Radom)

19 November 1950 22	Górnik Radlin	2–1	Gwardia Kraków	Radlin
13:00 CET (UTC+1)	Dybała 38', 68'	Report	Mordarski 90'	Attendance: 8,000; Referee: Witold Kukucki (Gdańsk)

== Squad, appearances and goals ==
No.	Pos	Nat	Player	Total		Ekstraklasa	
No.	Pos	Nat	Player	Apps	Goals	Apps	Goals
	GK	(Poland) POL	Jerzy Jurowicz	22	0	22+0	0
	DF	(Poland) POL	Mieczysław Dudek	22	0	22+0	0
	DF	(Poland) POL	Stanisław Flanek	14	0	14+0	0
	DF	(Poland) POL	Tadeusz Legutko	16	0	16+0	0
	MF	(Poland) POL	Wiesław Gamaj	1	0	1+0	0
	MF	(Poland) POL	Zdzisław Mordarski	22	10	22+0	10
	MF	(Poland) POL	Leszek Snopkowski	15	0	15+0	0
	MF	(Poland) POL	Mieczysław Szczurek	22	1	22+0	1
	MF	(Poland) POL	Adam Wapiennik	7	0	7+0	0
	MF	(Poland) POL	Jan Wapiennik	8	0	8+0	0
	FW	(Poland) POL	Kazimierz Cisowski	12	2	12+0	2
	FW	(Poland) POL	Mieczysław Gracz	22	12	22+0	12
	FW	(Poland) POL	Zbigniew Jaskowski	10	7	10+0	7
	FW	(Poland) POL	Józef Kohut	21	12	21+0	12
	FW	(Poland) POL	Józef Mamoń	16	3	16+0	3
	FW	(Poland) POL	Mieczysław Rupa	13	1	12+1	1

=== Goalscorers ===
Place	Position	Nation	Name	Ekstraklasa
1	FW	(Poland)	Mieczysław Gracz	12
1	FW	(Poland)	Józef Kohut	12
3	MF	(Poland)	Zdzisław Mordarski	10
4	FW	(Poland)	Zbigniew Jaskowski	7
5	FW	(Poland)	Józef Mamoń	3
6	FW	(Poland)	Kazimierz Cisowski	2
7	MF	(Poland)	Mieczysław Szczurek	1
7	FW	(Poland)	Mieczysław Rupa	1
7	DF	(Poland)	Augustyn Gaweł	1 (o.g.)
7	DF	(Poland)	Antoni Wołosz	1 (o.g.)
7	DF	(Poland)	Antoni Janik	1 (o.g.)
			Total	51

=== Disciplinary record ===
Name	Nation	Position	Mistrzostwa Polski	Total
Name	Nation	Position	Sent off (straight red)	Sent off (straight red)
Jan Wapiennik	(Poland)	MF	1	1
