= 1952 Wisła Kraków season =

Wisła Kraków
1952 season
- Chairman: Grzegorz Łanin
- Manager: Michał Matyas
- Ekstraklasa: 4th
- Polish Cup: Semifinal
- Ekstraklasa Cup: 3rd
- Top goalscorer: League: Zdzisław Mordarski (7 goals); All: Zdzisław Mordarski (10 goals)

The 1952 season was Wisła Kraków's 44th year as a club. Wisła was under the name of Gwardia Kraków.

== Friendlies ==
16 February 1952	Gwardia Kraków (Poland)	0–3	(Poland) Unia Chorzów	Kraków, Poland
		Report

25 February 1952	Unia Chorzów (Poland)	3–2	(Poland) Gwardia Kraków	Katowice, Poland
		Report

9 March 1952	Gwardia Kielce (Poland)	0–8	(Poland) Gwardia Kraków	Kielce, Poland
		Report	Kotaba; Oprych; Kohut; Patkolo

16 March 1952	Gwardia Kraków (Poland)	3–0	(Poland) Włókniarz Łódź	Kraków, Poland
		Report

19 March 1952	Dąbski KS (Poland)	0–3	(Poland) Gwardia Kraków	Kraków, Poland
		Report

23 March 1952	Ogniwo Bytom (Poland)	2–0	(Poland) Gwardia Kraków	Bytom, Poland
	Kruk 46'; Buczma 87'	Report		Attendance: 3,000; Referee: Antoni Kurek (Katowice)

29 March 1952	Budowlani Opole (Poland)	5–1	(Poland) Gwardia Kraków	Opole, Poland
		Report

30 March 1952	Gwardia Kraków (Poland)	1–0	(Poland) CWKS Warsaw	Kraków, Poland
	Gracz 20'	Report		Stadium: Stadion Gwardii; Attendance: 1,000; Referee: Julian Brzuchowski (Warsaw)

14 April 1952	Gwardia Kraków (Poland)	0–0	(Poland) Włókniarz Łódź	Kraków, Poland
		Report		Stadium: Stadion Gwardii

14 April 1952	Gwardia Kraków (Poland)	1–2	(Poland) Unia Chorzów	Kraków, Poland
	Jaskowski	Report	Alszer; Cieślik	Stadium: Stadion Gwardii; Attendance: 10,000; Referee: Kazimierz Bukowski (Radom)

20 April 1952	Unia Chorzów (Poland)	3–1	(Poland) Gwardia Kraków	Katowice, Poland
		Report

27 April 1952	Gwardia Kraków (Poland)	6–1	(Poland) Ogniwo Wrocław	Kraków, Poland
		Report

1 May 1952	Gwardia Kraków (Poland)	2–1	(East Germany) BSG Rotation Dresden	Łódź, Poland
	Mordarski; Mielniczek	Report

10 July 1952	Gwardia Kraków (Poland)	1–1	(Austria) Floridsdorfer AC	Kraków, Poland
	Kroczek 80'	Report	Domnanich 4'	Stadium: Stadion Gwardii; Attendance: 15,000; Referee: Mieczysław Walczak (Łódź)

10 August 1952	Górnik Zabrze (Poland)	2–3	(Poland) Gwardia Kraków	Zabrze, Poland
13:00 CET (UTC+1)		Report	Mamoń; Kotaba; Gamaj	Referee: Mieczysław Walczak (Łódź)

20 August 1952	Gwardia Kraków (Poland)	6–1	(Poland) Włókniarz Kraków	Kraków, Poland
	Śmietana; Machowski; Kościelny	Report	Browarski	Stadium: Stadion Gwardii

13 September 1952	Gwardia Kraków (Poland)	3–0	(Poland) Ogniwo Kraków	Kraków, Poland
	Kotaba; Jaskowski	Report		Stadium: Stadion Gwardii
Note: The match lasted 2x15 minutes.

13 September 1952	Gwardia Kraków (Poland)	3–1	(Poland) OWKS Kraków	Kraków, Poland
	Rogoza 3', 7'; Kohut 19'	Report	Piechaczek
Note: The match lasted 2x15 minutes.

20 September 1952	Gwardia Kraków (Poland)	3–0	(Poland) Budowlani Chorzów	Kraków, Poland
	Rogoza; Kotaba; Jaskowski	Report		Stadium: Stadion Gwardii; Attendance: 6,000; Referee: Władysław Pryk (Kraków)

30 November 1952	Gwardia Kraków (Poland)	1–0	(Poland) Ogniwo Kraków	Kraków, Poland
	Kohut 50'	Report		Stadium: Stadion Gwardii; Attendance: 8,000; Referee: Roman Mohyła (Kraków)

== Ekstraklasa ==
24 August 1952 1	Gwardia Kraków	3–0	Włókniarz Łódź	Kraków
18:00 CET (UTC+1)	Mordarski 9', 58', 75' (pen.)	Report		Stadium: Stadion Gwardii; Attendance: 10,000; Referee: Józef Orliński (Katowice)

31 August 1952 2	Ogniwo Bytom	2–0	Gwardia Kraków	Bytom
	Cehelik 29', 85'	Report		Stadium: Stadion Ogniwa; Attendance: 8,000; Referee: Zdzisław Hasselbusch (Warsaw)

6 September 1952 3	OWKS Kraków	2–2	Gwardia Kraków	Kraków
	Kroczek 24'; Więcek 26'; Kalus (red card) ??'	Report	Mordarski 37'; Kohut 38'	Stadium: Stadion OWKS-u; Attendance: 20,000; Referee: Józef Orliński (Katowice)

23 September 1952 4	CWKS Warsaw	3–0	Gwardia Kraków	Warsaw
	Brajter 25'; Sąsiadek 44'; Grajcar 57'	Report		Stadium: Stadion Wojska Polskiego; Attendance: 3,000; Referee: Stefan Kulczyk (Sosnowiec)

28 September 1952 5	Gwardia Kraków	2–1	Górnik Radlin	Kraków
12:00 CET (UTC+1)	Mordarski 24', 40'	Report	Piotrowski 20' (o.g.); Schleger (red card) 57'	Stadium: Stadion Gwardii; Attendance: 3,000; Referee: Władysław Przybysz (Bydgoszcz)

12 October 1952 6	Włókniarz Łódź	3–0	Gwardia Kraków	Łódź
14:45 CET (UTC+1)	Zygmuncik 5'; Wiernik 15'; Pawlikowski 76'	Report	Flanek (red card) 35'	Stadium: Stadion ŁKS-u; Attendance: 10,000; Referee: Marian Nalepa (Zabrze)

16 October 1952 7	Gwardia Kraków	2–1	CWKS Warsaw	Kraków
	Jaskowski; Mordarski (pen.)	Report	Sąsiadek 68'	Stadium: Stadion Gwardii; Attendance: 10,000; Referee: Antoni Kurek (Katowice)

19 October 1952 8	Gwardia Kraków	1–0	Ogniwo Bytom	Kraków
	Kohut 53'	Report		Stadium: Stadion Gwardii; Attendance: 15,000; Referee: Kazimierz Bukowski (Radom)

25 October 1952 9	Gwardia Kraków	1–0	OWKS Kraków	Kraków
14:00 CET (UTC+1)	Mamoń 87'	Report		Stadium: Stadion Gwardii; Attendance: 8,000; Referee: Franciszek Fronczyk (Tarnów)

2 November 1952 10	Górnik Radlin	0–0	Gwardia Kraków	Radlin
		Report		Stadium: Stadion Górnika; Attendance: 7,000; Referee: Czapski (Wrocław)

== Polish Cup ==
9 November 1952 Round of 32	Kolejarz Toruń	0–2	Gwardia Kraków	Bydgoszcz
		Report	Rogoza 54'; Kościelny 87'	Attendance: 3,000; Referee: Stychnecki (Warsaw)

16 November 1952 Round of 16	OWKS Bydgoszcz	1–2	Gwardia Kraków	Bydgoszcz
	Manowski	Report	Flanek 45' (pen.); Kohut 83'	Attendance: 2,000; Referee: Zdzisław Hasselbusch (Warsaw)

23 November 1952 Quarterfinal	Gwardia Kraków	5–0	OWKS Kraków	Kraków
	Kohut 17'; Kościelny 31'; Flanek 38'; Rogoza 44', 50'	Report

7 December 1952 Semifinal	CWKS Ib Warsaw	0–0 (a.e.t.)	Gwardia Warsaw	Wrocław
11:00 CET (UTC+1)		Report		Stadium: Stadion Olimpijski; Attendance: 5,000; Referee: Józef Szlejfer (Szczecin)
Note: The match least 150 minutes.

14 December 1952 Semifinal	CWKS Ib Warsaw	1–0 (a.e.t.)	Gwardia Warsaw	Warsaw
	Wieczorek 107'	Report		Attendance: 10,000; Referee: Edward Sperling (Łódź)

== Ekstraklasa Cup ==
6 April 1952 1	Ogniwo Bytom	1–1	Gwardia Kraków	Bytom
	Kempny 38'	Report	Gamaj 68'	Stadium: Stadion Ogniwa; Attendance: 5,000; Referee: Franciszek Wilczyński (Poznań)

20 April 1952 2	Unia Chorzów	0–0	Gwardia Kraków	Katowice
		Report		Attendance: 4,000; Referee: Władysław Smaczyński (Wrocław)

26 April 1952 3	Gwardia Kraków	0–3	OWKS Kraków	Kraków
		Report	Piechaczek; Kroczek	Stadium: Stadion Gwardii; Attendance: 5,000; Referee: Szczerzyński (Sosnowiec)

4 May 1952 4	Gwardia Kraków	2–2	Budowlani Gdańsk	Kraków
	Gamaj (pen.); Kościelny (penalty missed) ??'	Report	Nowicki; Gronowski; A. Kokot (penalty missed) ??'	Stadium: Stadion Gwardii; Attendance: 5,000; Referee: Stefan Kulczyk (Sosnowiec)

11 May 1952 5	Kolejarz Warsaw	1–2	Gwardia Kraków	Warsaw
	Kobylański 49'	Report	Mordarski 4'; Kohut 30'	Referee: Franciszek Wilczyński (Poznań)

18 May 1952 6	Gwardia Kraków	2–1	Ogniwo Bytom	Kraków
	Rogoza; Kohut	Report	Kempny	Stadium: Stadion Gwardii; Referee: Edmund Andrzejak (Łódź)

25 May 1952 7	Gwardia Kraków	7–0	Unia Chorzów	Kraków
	Gamaj; Mordarski; Kohut; Kotaba; Unknown player (o.g.)	Report		Stadium: Stadion Gwardii; Attendance: 12,000; Referee: Czesław Wasilewski (Poznań)

1 June 1952 8	OWKS Kraków	2–1	Gwardia Kraków	Kraków
	Kroczek; Dwernicki	Report	Kohut	Attendance: 15,000; Referee: Zdzisław Hasselbusch (Warsaw)

28 June 1952 9	Gwardia Kraków	2–0	Kolejarz Warsaw	Kraków
	Mordarski (pen.); Rogoza	Report		Stadium: Stadion Gwardii; Attendance: 4,000; Referee: Józef Orliński (Katowice)

6 July 1952 10	Budowlani Gdańsk	2–0	Gwardia Kraków	Gdańsk
	A. Kokot; Kupcewicz	Report		Attendance: 12,000; Referee: Czesław Kołodziejski (Poznań)

20 July 1952 Third place play-off	Budowlani Chorzów	1–2	Gwardia Kraków	Warsaw
	Kulik	Report	Mordarski 17'; Ślizowski 59'	Referee: Stefan Paszkowski (Warsaw)

== Squad, appearances and goals ==
No.	Pos	Nat	Player	Total		Ekstraklasa		Polish Cup		Ekstraklasa Cup	
No.	Pos	Nat	Player	Apps	Goals	Apps	Goals	Apps	Goals	Apps	Goals
	GK	(Poland) POL	Jerzy Jurowicz	18	0	10+0	0	3+0	0	5+0	0
	GK	(Poland) POL	Zbigniew Lech	2	0	0+0	0	1+0	0	1+0	0
	GK	(Poland) POL	Antoni Ziernicki	6	0	0+0	0	0+0	0	5+1	0
	DF	(Poland) POL	Stanisław Flanek	18	2	9+0	0	5+0	2	4+0	0
	DF	(Poland) POL	Jerzy Piotrowski	16	0	5+1	0	0+0	0	8+2	0
	DF	(Poland) POL	Eugeniusz Wójcik	12	0	1+0	0	1+0	0	10+0	0
	MF	(Poland) POL	Ryszard Jędrys	4	0	0+0	0	1+0	0	3+0	0
	MF	(Poland) POL	Włodzimierz Kościelny	12	2	0+0	0	5+0	2	5+2	0
	MF	(Poland) POL	Zbigniew Kotaba	19	1	8+2	0	4+0	0	5+0	1
	MF	(Poland) POL	Józef Mamoń	11	0	9+0	0	2+0	0	0+0	0
	MF	(Poland) POL	Mykytyszyn	4	0	0+0	0	0+0	0	3+1	0
	MF	(Poland) POL	Noskowski	1	0	1+0	0	0+0	0	0+0	0
	MF	(Poland) POL	Leszek Snopkowski	22	0	9+0	0	4+0	0	9+0	0
	MF	(Poland) POL	Mieczysław Szczurek	19	0	9+0	0	5+0	0	4+1	0
	MF	(Poland) POL	Kazimierz Ślizowski	10	0	4+0	0	3+0	0	3+0	0
	MF	(Poland) POL	Jan Wapiennik	13	0	2+1	0	1+0	0	9+0	0
	FW	(Poland) POL	Będkowski	2	0	0+0	0	0+0	0	1+1	0
	FW	(Poland) POL	Wiesław Gamaj	16	6	4+2	0	0+0	0	10+0	6
	FW	(Poland) POL	Mieczysław Gracz	3	0	3+0	0	0+0	0	0+0	0
	FW	(Poland) POL	Zbigniew Jaskowski	16	1	9+0	1	5+0	0	2+0	0
	FW	(Poland) POL	Józef Kohut	19	8	8+0	2	5+0	2	6+0	4
	FW	(Poland) POL	Zdzisław Mordarski	16	10	10+0	7	0+0	0	6+0	3
	FW	(Poland) POL	Rudolf Patkolo	10	0	6+1	0	0+2	0	1+0	0
	FW	(Poland) POL	Pogorzałek	1	0	0+0	0	0+0	0	1+0	0
	FW	(Poland) POL	Antoni Rogoza	16	5	2+2	0	5+0	3	6+1	2
	FW	(Poland) POL	Józef Śmietana	4	0	0+0	0	0+0	0	4+0	0

=== Goalscorers ===
Place	Position	Nation	Name	Ekstraklasa	Polish Cup	Ekstraklasa Cup	Total
1	FW	(Poland)	Zdzisław Mordarski	7	0	3	10
2	FW	(Poland)	Józef Kohut	2	2	4	8
3	FW	(Poland)	Wiesław Gamaj	0	0	6	6
4	FW	(Poland)	Antoni Rogoza	0	3	2	5
5	DF	(Poland)	Stanisław Flanek	0	2	0	2
5	MF	(Poland)	Włodzimierz Kościelny	0	2	0	2
7	FW	(Poland)	Zbigniew Jaskowski	1	0	0	1
7	MF	(Poland)	Zbigniew Kotaba	0	0	1	1
7	-	-	Opposition own goal	0	0	1	1
			Totals	10	9	17	36

=== Disciplinary record ===
Name	Nation	Position	Ekstraklasa	Polish Cup	Ekstraklasa Cup	Total
Name	Nation	Position	Sent off (straight red)	Sent off (straight red)	Sent off (straight red)	
Stanisław Flanek	(Poland)	DF	1	0	0	1
