= Mieczysław Szczurek =

Polish footballer

Personal information
- Date of birth: 13 January 1923
- Place of birth: Kraków, Austria-Hungary
- Date of death: 12 May 1978 (aged 55)
- Place of death: Kraków, Poland
- Height: 1.81 m (5 ft 11 in)
- Position: Midfielder

Senior career*
Years	Team	Apps	(Gls)
1936–1939	Nadwiślan Kraków		
1945	Raźny Skierniewice		
1945–1949	Legia Warsaw		
1949–1955	Wisła Kraków		
1955–1962	Start-Oldboye Kraków		

International career
1947–1950	Poland	5	(0)
- * Club domestic league appearances and goals

Mieczysław Szczurek (13 January 1923 – 12 May 1978) was a Polish footballer who played as a midfielder.

He made five appearances for the Poland national team from 1947 to 1950.

== Honours ==
Wisła Kraków

- Ekstraklasa: 1949, 1950, 1951
