= Josef Kuchynka =

Czech footballer (1894–1979)

Personal information
- Date of birth: 4 August 1894
- Place of birth: Prague, Austria-Hungary
- Date of death: 9 January 1979 (aged 84)
- Place of death: Czechoslovakia
- Position: Defender

Senior career*
Years	Team	Apps	(Gls)
1915–1935	DFC Prague		

International career
1924	Czechoslovakia	1	(0)

Managerial career
- 1935–1936: SK Kladno
- 1938: SK Kladno
- 1939: SK Židenice
- 1939–1944: Sparta Prague
- 1945–1946: Slovena Žilina
- 1946–1948: SK Slezská Ostrava
- 1948–1950: Wisła Kraków
- 1948: Garbarnia Kraków
- 1952–1953: Svit Gottwaldov
- 1955–1956: Włókniarz Kraków
- 1958: Wisła Kraków
- * Club domestic league appearances and goals

Josef Kuchynka (4 August 1894 – 9 January 1979) was a Czechoslovak football manager and player. He was also part of Czechoslovakia's squad at the 1924 Olympics, but he did not play in any matches.

A locksmith by profession, Kuchynka played as a footballer mostly for DFC Prague, a football team of ethnic Germans in Prague. In 1924 he appeared in one Czechoslovakia national team match, playing against Yugoslavia in Zagreb. During World War II, Kuchynka coached Sparta Prague. After the war, he coached SK Slezská Ostrava from 1946 to 1948. After the communist takeover of power in February 1948, he was forbidden to work as a professional football manager and was supposed to work in a coal mine. He decided to leave Czechoslovakia and later worked in Poland, coaching Wisła Kraków in 1948–1950. He returned to Czechoslovakia in his retirement age.

== Honours ==
=== Manager ===
Sparta Prague

- Czechoslovak First League: 1938–39, 1943–44

Wisła Kraków

- Ekstraklasa: 1949, 1950
