= Józef Wieczorek =

Polish footballer

Personal information
- Date of birth: 6 January 1931
- Place of birth: Bytom, Poland
- Date of death: 1 March 2003 (aged 72)
- Place of death: Dortmund, Germany
- Height: 1.67 m (5 ft 6 in)
- Position: Defender

Senior career*
Years	Team	Apps	(Gls)
1945–1950	Bobrek Karb Bytom		
1950–1951	Zagłębie Sosnowiec		
1952–1953	Legia Warsaw		
1954–1964	Polonia Bytom		

International career
1953	Poland	2	(0)
- * Club domestic league appearances and goals

Józef Wieczorek (6 January 1931 – 1 March 2003) was a Polish footballer who played as a defender.

He made two appearances for the Poland national team in 1953.

== Honours ==
Polonia Bytom

- Ekstraklasa: 1954, 1962
