= Michał Matyas =

Polish footballer (1910–1975)

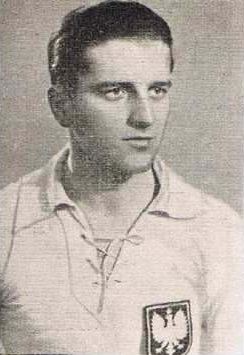

Personal information
- Full name: Michał Franciszek Mieczysław Matyas
- Date of birth: 28 September 1910
- Place of birth: Brzozów, Austria-Hungary
- Date of death: 22 October 1975 (aged 65)
- Place of death: Kraków, Poland
- Height: 1.76 m (5 ft 9 in)
- Position: Striker

Youth career
- 1924–1926: Lechia Lwów

Senior career*
Years	Team	Apps	(Gls)
1926–1939	Pogoń Lwów	156	(100)
1939–1940	Naftovyk Boryslav		
1941	Dynamo Kyiv	6	(2)
1942–1944	Lwów local teams		
1945–1948	Polonia Bytom		

International career
1932–1939	Poland	18	(7)

Managerial career
- 1950–1954: Gwardia Kraków
- 1955–1956: Warta Poznań
- 1957–1958: Stal Mielec
- 1959–1961: Cracovia
- 1962–1963: Stal Mielec
- 1963–1965: Polonia Bytom
- 1966–1967: Poland
- 1968–1969: Cracovia
- 1969–1970: Górnik Zabrze
- 1970–1971: Wisła Kraków
- 1972–1973: Cracovia
- * Club domestic league appearances and goals

Michał Franciszek Mieczysław Matyas (28 September 1910 – 22 October 1975) was a Polish footballer, who represented such teams as Pogoń Lwów and Polonia Bytom, as well as the Poland national team. Among fans in Poland he was known as Myszka and in the Soviet Union he played under name of Mikhail. His real occupation was a petroleum technician.

== Career ==
Matyas was born in Brzozów. After moving to Lviv in 1924 he started playing in junior team of Lechia and in 1926 moved to Pogoń, for which Matyas played for 14 seasons. His debut in the national team took place on 10 July 1932 in Warsaw in a 2–0 win against Sweden 2–0). All together he played in 18 international games (including the 1936 Summer Olympics in Berlin), scoring 7 goals. In Pogoń, in 1935 he was the top-scorer of the Polish Football League, with 22 goals.

During the World War II in 1939–40, Matyas played in Soviet competitions for Naftovyk Boryslav and, for a short while, for FC Dynamo Kyiv in 1941. Soon after the Nazi invasion of the Soviet Union, he returned to Lviv where he played for some local city teams in 1942–44. Following the war, Lviv was secured after the Soviet Union (as part of Soviet Ukraine), together with a group of Pogoń's players and activists, he settled in Bytom, where he played for Polonia Bytom in 1945–48. After finishing his career, he became a coach, in 1950-1952 he was in charge of the national team of Poland. Later, he coached such teams as Stal Mielec and Cracovia. He died on 22 October 1975 in Kraków.

== Honours ==
=== Player ===
Pogoń Lwów

- Ekstraklasa runner-up: 1932, 1933, 1935

Lwów city team

- President of Poland Bowl: 1938

Individual

- Ekstraklasa top scorer: 1935

=== Manager ===
Gwardia Kraków

- Ekstraklasa: 1951

Górnik Zabrze

- Polish Cup: 1969–70
