= Antoni Janik =

Polish footballer (1920–2003)

Personal information
- Birth name: Werner Richard Janik
- Date of birth: 15 April 1920
- Place of birth: Zabrze, Poland
- Date of death: 7 August 2003 (aged 83)
- Place of death: Worms, Germany
- Height: 1.80 m (5 ft 11 in)
- Position: Goalkeeper

Youth career
- 1930–1939: AKS Chorzów

Senior career*
| Years | Team | Apps | (Gls) |
| 1939–1945 | Germania Königshütte | | |
| 1945–1946 | AKS Chorzów | | |
| 1946–1948 | Pogoń Katowice | | |
| 1949–1955 | AKS Chorzów | | |
| 1953 | → Gwardia Katowice (loan) | | |

International career
| 1947–1948 | Poland | 7 | (0) |
- * Club domestic league appearances and goals

Antoni Janik (born Werner Richard Janik; 15 April 1920 – 7 August 2003) was a Polish footballer who played as a goalkeeper.

He made seven appearances for the Poland national team from 1947 to 1948.
