= Maksymilian Barański =

Polish footballer

Personal information
- Date of birth: 14 April 1926
- Place of birth: Chorzów, Poland
- Date of death: 9 May 2010 (aged 84)
- Place of death: Dortmund, Germany
- Height: 1.60 m (5 ft 3 in)
- Position: Forward

Senior career*
Years	Team	Apps	(Gls)
1938–1939	AKS Chorzów		
1940–1944	Germania Königshütte		
1945–1954	AKS Chorzów		
- Koszarawa Żywiec
- Unia Oświęcim

International career
1947	Poland	5	(0)

Managerial career
- Koszarawa Żywiec (player-manager)
- Unia Oświęcim (player-manager)
- Górnik Zabrze II
- * Club domestic league appearances and goals

Maksymilian Barański (14 April 1926 – 9 May 2010) was a Polish footballer who played as a forward.

He made five appearances for the Poland national team in 1947.
