= Józef Mamoń =

Polish footballer

Personal information
- Full name: Józef Tadeusz Mamoń
- Date of birth: 23 February 1922
- Place of birth: Kraków, Poland
- Date of death: 16 May 1979 (aged 57)
- Place of death: Kraków, Poland
- Height: 1.72 m (5 ft 8 in)
- Position: Forward

Senior career*
| Years | Team | Apps | (Gls) |
| 1938–1939 | Korona Kraków | | |
| 1945–1946 | Korona Kraków | | |
| 1946–1947 | Zapłon Jelenia Góra | | |
| 1947–1954 | Wisła Kraków | 92 | (22) |
| 1953 | Kabel Kraków | | |

International career
| 1949–1952 | Poland | 9 | (2) |
- * Club domestic league appearances and goals

Józef Tadeusz Mamoń (23 February 1922 – 16 May 1979) was a Polish footballer who played as a midfielder. He competed in the 1952 Summer Olympics.

== Honours ==
Wisła Kraków

- Ekstraklasa: 1949, 1950, 1951
