= Teodor Anioła =

Polish footballer (1925–1993)

Personal information
- Date of birth: 4 November 1925
- Place of birth: Poznań, Poland
- Date of death: 10 July 1993 (aged 67)
- Place of death: Poznań, Poland
- Height: 1.72 m (5 ft 8 in)
- Position: Midfielder

Senior career*
Years	Team	Apps	(Gls)
1945–1961	Lech Poznań	196	(141)

International career
1950–1954	Poland	7	(2)
- * Club domestic league appearances and goals

Teodor Anioła (4 November 1925 – 10 July 1993) was a Polish professional footballer who played as a midfielder. Considered an icon of Lech Poznań, he is the club's all-time best scorer. He earned the nickname "Diabeł" ("the Devil") for his performances as a midfielder and right-winger, which in total brought him 141 goals in 196 Polish top division games.

He has been voted Poznań's most popular sportsman in history, also in the 1985 survey in Poznań's local newspaper was voted the greatest athlete of the last 40 years. He scored two goals in seven international appearances for the Poland national team.

He was the brother of fellow footballer Jan Anioła.

== Honours ==
Individual

- Ekstraklasa top scorer: 1949, 1950, 1951
- Lech Poznań All-time XI

== Sources ==
- (in Polish) lechpoznan
