= Zygmunt Kulawik =

Polish footballer

Personal information
- Date of birth: 3 January 1921
- Place of birth: Świętochłowice, Poland
- Date of death: 1982 (aged 60–61)
- Height: 1.72 m (5 ft 8 in)
- Position: Forward

Senior career*
Years	Team	Apps	(Gls)
1935–1941	Śląsk Świętochłowice		
- Hannover 96
1947–1954	Polonia Bytom		

International career
1939–1947	Poland	3	(0)
- * Club domestic league appearances and goals

Zygmunt Kulawik (3 January 1921 – 1982) was a Polish footballer who played as a forward.

He made three appearances for the Poland national team from 1939 to 1947.

== Honours ==
Polonia Bytom

- Ekstraklasa: 1954
