= Stanisław Flanek =

Polish footballer

Personal information
- Date of birth: 18 April 1919
- Place of birth: Kraków, Poland
- Date of death: 4 November 2009 (aged 90)
- Place of death: Kraków, Poland
- Height: 1.75 m (5 ft 9 in)
- Position: Defender

Senior career*
Years	Team	Apps	(Gls)
1936–1945	Prokocim Kraków		
1946–1954	Wisła Kraków		

International career
1947–1950	Poland	8	(0)
- * Club domestic league appearances and goals

Stanisław Flanek (18 April 1919 – 4 November 2009) was a Polish footballer who played as a defender.

He made eight appearances for the Poland national team from 1947 to 1950.

== Honours ==
Wisła Kraków

- Ekstraklasa: 1949, 1950, 1951
