= Zbigniew Jaskowski =

Polish footballer (1929–2006)

Personal information
- Date of birth: 15 March 1929
- Place of birth: Kraków, Poland
- Date of death: 7 June 2006 (aged 77)
- Place of death: Kraków, Poland
- Height: 1.65 m (5 ft 5 in)
- Position: Forward

Senior career*
Years	Team	Apps	(Gls)
1945–1955	Wisła Kraków		
1957	BKS Stal Bielsko-Biała		

International career
1952	Poland	1	(0)
- * Club domestic league appearances and goals

Zbigniew Jaskowski (15 March 1929 – 7 June 2006) was a Polish footballer who played as a forward.

He made one appearance for the Poland national team in 1952. He was also part of Poland's squad for the football tournament at the 1952 Summer Olympics, but he did not play in any matches.

== Honours ==
Wisła Kraków

- Ekstraklasa: 1949, 1950, 1951
