= Jiří Kuchler =

Czech ice hockey player

- Born: April 8, 1977 (age 47)
- Height: 5 ft 11 in (180 cm)
- Weight: 198 lb (90 kg; 14 st 2 lb)
- Position: Forward
- Shot: Left
- Played for: Rytíři Kladno
- Playing career: 1995–2016

Jiří Kuchler (born April 8, 1977) is a Czech former professional ice hockey player.

Kuchler played 536 games with Rytíři Kladno in the Czech Extraliga, from 1994 to 1999 and from 2005 to 2014.
