= Marian Łącz =

Polish footballer and actor

Personal information
- Full name: Marian Mikołaj Łącz
- Date of birth: 5 December 1921
- Place of birth: Rzeszów, Poland
- Date of death: 2 August 1984 (aged 62)
- Place of death: Warsaw, Poland
- Height: 1.82 m (6 ft 0 in)
- Position: Forward

Senior career*
Years	Team	Apps	(Gls)
1935–1939	Resovia Rzeszów		
1944–1945	Sokół Rzeszów		
1945	Lechia Gdańsk	5	(13)
1946–1949	ŁKS Łódź	63	(55)
1950–1956	Polonia Warsaw	35	(28)

International career
1949–1950	Poland	3	(0)
- * Club domestic league appearances and goals

Marian Mikołaj Łącz (5 December 1921 – 2 August 1984) was a Polish international footballer who played as a forward, and later a theater and film actor.

== Football ==
Born in Rzeszów, Łącz started his footballing career with his local team Resovia Rzeszów. The outbreak of World War II put his footballing career on hold until 1944, when he started playing for Sokół Rzeszów with his brother, Tadeusz. In 1946 he moved to Gdańsk to play for Lechia Gdańsk. He made his Lechia debut on 9 September 1945 against WKS 16 Dyw. Gdańsk in a 9–1 win. While being Łącz's first game for the club, it was also the club's first ever competitive game. He spent 6 months with Lechia, during which time he made 10 appearances and scored 25 goals, scoring six hat-trick in his 10 games and finishing as the club's top scorer for the season. After his time with Lechia he joined ŁKS Łódź. He had a successful time with ŁKS putting in good performances which got him the attention of the Polish media at the time. He helped ŁKS Łódź achieve promotion to the top division in 1948, playing in the I liga for ŁKS in 1949. During his time at ŁKS he proved himself to be a valuable forward finishing as the top scorer in 1948 with 17 goals and 1949 with 18 goals. In 1950 Łącz moved to Warsaw to join Polonia Warsaw, a decision partly made due to Warsaw having the Aleksander Zelwerowicz National Academy. While with Polonia he again showed his goal-scoring prowess, finishing as the club's top scorer in 1951 and 1952. In 1952 Polonia were both relegated from the I liga and won the Polish Cup, beating rivals Legia Warsaw in the final 1–0. It is documented that at times while playing for Polonia he was substituted before half-time so he was able to meet his acting commitments at the theater. He continued to play for Polonia in the II liga until he retired to focus on his acting career in 1956.

Łącz made three international appearances for Poland, making his debut on 8 May 1949 against Romania. The other two games came in 1950, against Hungary and Czechoslovakia, with all three of his international caps coming in defeats for Poland.

== Acting ==
He started acting in 1945, performing in the Rzeszów theater. He moved to Łódź and studied at the National Film School in Łódź, eventually moving to Warsaw to perform and study at the Aleksander Zelwerowicz National Academy. After retiring from football his acting roles became more prevalent. He mainly retired from acting in 1981, but held small roles until his death in 1984.

== Personal life ==
His father was an officer in the army and his mother worked in theater. He had a brother, Tadeusz, who was a footballer, and had two sisters. His daughter, Laura Łącz, is an actress.

== Honours ==
Polonia Warsaw

- Polish Cup: 1952

== Filmography ==
A list of TV shows and films Łącz has had a role in.

Year	English Title	Role	Notes
1949	Black Glazing	WOP patrol commander	Film
1955	Podhale in Fire	Wawrzek	Film
1956	Revenge	servant of Rejent	Film
1956	Shadow	Stefan	Film
1958	Eighth Day of the Week	Bandit	Film
1958	Fatal Mistake	Jean	TV
1958	What Rekna Zena	Florczak	Film
1959	Thousand Talars	tsarist gendarme & paramedic in helicopter	Film
1959	Volatile	Corporal	Film
1960	Return	drunk man	Film
1960	Colourful Stockings	gymnastics teacher	Film
1961	Difficult Marriage	instructor officer	Film (short)
1961	Against Gods	driver of Karol Doroń	Film
1962	The Two Who Stole the Moon	peasant	Film
1962	My Old	PE teacher	Film
1962	Gangsters and Philanthropists	police officer & professor	Film
1963	Too Bad Moustache	Łukasz	TV
1963	Youngster	police officer	Film
1963	Bathed in Fire	Platoon Tomala	Film
1963	"Yokmok"	partner of the metastasis organizer	Film
1964	Meeting with a Spy	PKS driver & Zygmunt	Film
1964	Conscience Account	driver	Film
1964	Please Enter, the Door is Open	Oleś	TV
1964	Candide	soldier	TV
1964	Combat Colours	"Whip"	Film
1965	Three Steps on Earth	ambulance drive	Film
1965	Jihad	Zakrzewski	Film
1965	Sixth of July	sentry	TV
1965	A Stake Larger than Life	Wacek	TV
1965	Underground Front	casino bartender	TV
1965	Last Day, First Day	driver	TV
1966	Civil War	singing policeman	TV
1966	Christmas Evening	veteran	Film
1966	We Love Mirrors	driver	Film
1966	Boxer	celebrating man	Film
1967	Death to Pears	soldier	TV
1967	A Stake Larger than Life	undercover guard	TV
1967	Paris to Warsaw without a Visa	Lieutenant Henryk Lipiński	Film
1967	A Month in the Countryside	Matwia	TV
1967	When Love was a Crime	prisoner	Film
1968	Evening Outside the Home	salesman	TV
1968	Berlin Direction	Platoon Walasek	Film
1968	Dancing at Hitlers Accommodation	tourist at hotel	Film
1969	Last Days	Platoon Walasek	Film
1969	Kollokacja	butler	TV
1970	Holiday with Spirits	policeman	TV
1970	Adventure of a Dog, Civil	officer conducting dog training	TV
1970	Brutus Action	porter in the hotel	Film
1971	Kill Black Sheep	sharp	Film
1971	Across Country	man in action for firefighters	TV film
1971	Problem Guest	trunk driver	TV
1971	Black Notes	sergeant	TV
1972	I Want to get Married	Orski	TV
1973	Your King	mechanic	TV film
1973	Marian Caps	Malvolio	TV
1973	Janosik	robber Słowak	TV
1974	Victory	Platoon Walasek	Film
1974	The Most Important Day of Life	Jan Chwalko	TV film
1974	Janosik	robber Słowak	Film
1975	Lighter	Head	TV
1975	A Great Man for Small Interests	butler	TV
1975	Kazimierz the Great	Stanisław	Film
1975	Horsztyński	courtier	TV
1976	Polish Roads	Ułan Iwaniuk	TV
1976	Brunet in the Evening	Andrzej	Film
1977	Doll	soldier	TV
1977	Love or Quit	Jan Pawlak	Film
1977	Girl and Boy	gamekeeper	TV
1978	What Will You do to Me if you Catch Me	worker at the station	Film
1978	Green Love	worker	TV
1978	Footprint on Earth	laborer	TV
1980	Home	Mr. Misiek	TV
1980	The Sinful Life of Franciszek Buła	Ficek	Film
1981	Bear	collector	Film
1981	White Tango	Teresa's father	TV
1982	Calcine	Krzemień	TV
1983	Alternatives 4	Władysław Matraczak	TV
1984	Pan in Żuławy	peasant	TV

A list of TV shows and films in which Łącz was part of the cast, but not as an acting role.

Year	English Title	Notes
1957	Guests at Dusk	Film
1960	Fear has Big Eyes	TV
1962	Broken Bridge	Film
1962	Uncle Wania	TV
1963	Closed Town	TV
1965	Escape and Return	TV
1965	Captain from Köpenick	TV
1966	Hard Knock	TV
1966	Wild Palm	TV
1967	Romeo with Samara	TV
1967	Four Friends from Silent Street	TV
1969	Volunteer	TV
1973	Great Ballouse Love	TV
1975	Feel Combined	Film
1977	Return of Members	TV
1977	Holiday Makers	TV
1984	Love from the Hits	Film
