= 1949 Ekstraklasa =

23rd season of top-tier football league in Poland

Liga
- Season: 1949
- Champions: Wisła Kraków (3rd title)
- Relegated: Polonia Bytom; Lechia Gdańsk
- Top goalscorer: Teodor Anioła (21 goals)

Statistics of Ekstraklasa for the 1949 season.

== Overview ==
It was contested by 12 teams, and Wisła Kraków won the championship.

== League table ==
Pos	Team	Pld	W	D	L	GF	GA	GD	Pts
1	Wisła Kraków (C)	22	13	4	5	50	21	+29	30
2	KS Cracovia	22	10	9	3	44	29	+15	29
3	Lech Poznań	22	10	7	5	60	37	+23	27
4	Polonia Warsaw	22	11	5	6	43	29	+14	27
5	AKS Chorzów	22	9	5	8	40	44	−4	23
6	ŁKS Łódź	22	8	6	8	43	48	−5	22
7	Warta Poznań	22	7	7	8	36	35	+1	21
8	Ruch Chorzów	22	7	5	10	42	48	−6	19
9	Legia Warsaw	22	7	5	10	37	43	−6	19
10	Szombierki Bytom	22	7	5	10	34	54	−20	19
11	Polonia Bytom (R)	22	6	5	11	37	43	−6	17
12	Lechia Gdańsk (R)	22	4	3	15	26	67	−41	11

Source: 90minut.pl (in Polish)
(C) Champions; (R) Relegated

== Results ==
Home \ Away	AKS	CRA	LPO	LGD	LEG	ŁKS	BYT	PWA	RUC	SZB	WAR	WIS
AKS Chorzów		2–1	1–1	2–0	0–3	1–0	3–2	3–0	1–0	1–3	3–2	1–2
Cracovia	3–1		1–1	5–1	1–1	2–1	1–0	4–2	3–3	5–0	1–1	0–0
Lech Poznań	7–3	1–2		1–1	4–1	8–1	3–3	3–2	8–4	8–0	2–1	2–1
Lechia Gdańsk	2–4	1–1	0–1		0–3	2–1	3–1	0–3	5–3	1–2	1–4	1–5
Legia Warsaw	3–3	1–4	1–3	4–4		1–5	5–1	0–2	2–0	2–4	2–0	0–0
ŁKS Łódź	1–1	2–2	4–1	5–1	0–0		0–0	2–1	2–0	5–2	3–0	2–8
Polonia Bytom	2–1	1–2	2–2	8–0	0–3	2–1		1–2	2–1	1–2	2–2	0–2
Polonia Warsaw	4–4	2–1	1–1	5–1	2–1	2–1	3–0		2–2	2–1	0–0	0–1
Ruch Chorzów	3–2	2–2	2–0	2–0	3–2	2–3	2–2	0–3		3–1	3–0	0–3
Szombierki Bytom	0–0	2–2	2–1	3–0	1–2	3–3	0–3	1–1	1–6		1–1	2–0
Warta Poznań	2–3	4–0	2–2	0–2	2–0	4–4	1–2	2–1	3–0	3–2		1–0
Wisła Kraków	3–0	0–1	2–0	4–0	4–0	5–3	4–2	0–3	1–1	4–1	1–1	

Source: 90minut.pl (in Polish)
Legend: Blue = home team win; Yellow = draw; Red = away team win.

== Top goalscorers ==
Rank	Player	Club	Goals
1	(Poland) Teodor Anioła	Lech Poznań	20
2	(Poland) Marian Łącz	ŁKS Łódź	18
3	(Poland) Gerard Cieślik	Ruch Chorzów	17
4	(Poland) Józef Kohut	Wisła Kraków	16
5	(Poland) Edmund Białas	Lech Poznań	12
5	(Poland) Jerzy Krasówka	Szombierki Bytom	12
7	(Poland) Stanisław Baran	ŁKS Łódź	11
7	(Poland) Mieczysław Gracz	Wisła Kraków	11
7	(Poland) Zygmunt Ochmański	Polonia Warsaw	11
7	(Poland) Stanisław Różankowski	Cracovia	11
7	(Poland) Jan Wiśniewski	Polonia Bytom	11
