= 1951 Ekstraklasa =

25th season of top-tier football league in Poland

Liga
- Season: 1951
- Champions: Ruch Chorzów (6th title; declared the Polish champion); Wisła Kraków (declared the league champion)
- Relegated: Garbarnia Kraków; Arkonia Szczecin
- Top goalscorer: Teodor Anioła (20 goals)

Statistics of Ekstraklasa for the 1951 season.

== Overview ==
12 teams played in the league and Wisła Kraków finished in the first position and became the league champion. In the 1951 season, the Ekstraklasa was not a competition for the title of the Polish Champion. Before the season Polish Football Association decided that Champion of Poland title will be awarded to the winner of the Polish Cup, which was later Ruch Chorzów.

== League table ==
Pos	Team	Pld	W	D	L	GF	GA	GD	Pts	Qualification or relegation
1	Wisła Kraków (C)	22	13	6	3	43	13	+30	32	Declared the league champion
2	Górnik Radlin	22	12	5	5	41	28	+13	29	
3	Legia Warsaw	22	12	3	7	37	31	+6	27	
4	AKS Chorzów	22	12	1	9	34	23	+11	25	
5	KS Cracovia	22	10	5	7	33	31	+2	25	
6	Ruch Chorzów (C)	22	11	2	9	46	35	+11	24	Declared the Polish champion by winning the 1950–51 Polish Cup
7	Polonia Warsaw	22	10	3	9	33	28	+5	23	
8	Lech Poznań	22	10	3	9	35	37	−2	23	
9	ŁKS Łódź	22	7	4	11	22	32	−10	18	
10	Polonia Bytom	22	5	6	11	16	26	−10	16	
11	Garbarnia Kraków (R)	22	4	7	11	30	42	−12	15	Relegated to II liga
12	Arkonia Szczecin (R)	22	1	5	16	17	61	−44	7	Relegated to II liga

Source: 90minut.pl (in Polish)
(C) Champions; (R) Relegated

== Results ==
Home \ Away	AKS	ARK	CRA	GAR	GRA	LPO	LEG	ŁKS	BYT	PWA	RUC	WIS
AKS Chorzów		1–0	3–1	4–0	0–1	3–1	1–2	2–1	3–0	1–3	1–3	2–0
Arkonia Szczecin	0–4		1–2	1–4	0–3	1–1	1–4	1–2	0–1	0–2	3–0	0–5
Cracovia	3–0	1–1		3–2	2–1	3–1	2–1	1–0	1–1	0–2	0–1	0–0
Garbarnia Kraków	0–1	1–1	1–1		1–1	4–0	1–2	1–1	1–0	5–1	2–3	0–3
Górnik Radlin	2–1	3–3	3–1	1–1		3–1	1–2	3–1	2–1	3–0	1–1	2–2
Lech Poznań	1–1	3–0	2–0	3–1	4–2		1–3	2–1	2–1	2–0	4–5	1–0
Legia Warsaw	1–0	4–2	2–4	1–1	2–3	1–1		0–0	0–1	1–0	3–2	1–4
ŁKS Łódź	0–1	2–1	1–0	4–2	0–1	0–3	0–2		1–0	0–1	3–1	2–1
Polonia Bytom	0–1	1–1	1–1	3–0	1–0	3–0	0–1	1–1		0–0	0–4	0–1
Polonia Warsaw	2–1	5–0	1–5	4–0	0–1	3–0	1–2	1–1	5–1		1–0	0–0
Ruch Chorzów	1–3	8–0	1–2	3–1	2–3	0–2	2–1	3–1	1–0	3–1		1–2
Wisła Kraków	1–0	4–0	5–0	1–1	2–1	2–0	3–1	4–0	0–0	2–0	1–1	

Source: 90minut.pl (in Polish)
Legend: Blue = home team win; Yellow = draw; Red = away team win.

== Top goalscorers ==
Rank	Player	Club	Goals
1	(Poland) Teodor Anioła	Lech Poznań	20
2	(Poland) Gerard Cieślik	Ruch Chorzów	19
3	(Poland) Mieczysław Gracz	Wisła Kraków	16
4	(Poland) Marian Łącz	Polonia Warsaw	14
5	(Poland) Henryk Spodzieja	AKS Chorzów	12
6	(Poland) Henryk Bożek	Garbarnia Kraków	11
7	(Poland) Józef Kohut	Wisła Kraków	10
8	(Poland) Tadeusz Hogendorf	ŁKS Łódź	9
9	(Poland) Zdzisław Mordarski	Wisła Kraków	8
9	(Poland) Mieczysław Nowak	Garbarnia Kraków	8
