= Jerzy Krasówka =

Polish footballer

Personal information
- Full name: Jerzy Wilibald Krasówka
- Date of birth: 17 August 1924
- Place of birth: Gliwice, Poland
- Date of death: 11 April 2001 (aged 76)
- Place of death: Wetzlar, Germany
- Height: 1.79 m (5 ft 10 in)
- Position: Forward

Senior career*
Years	Team	Apps	(Gls)
1932–1940	SV Schomberg		
1940–1942	09 Beuthen		
1942–1944	Sportfreunde Neisse		
1945–1951	Szombierki Bytom		
1951	Górnik Radlin		
1952–1956	Szombierki Bytom		

International career
1949–1953	Poland	5	(0)
- * Club domestic league appearances and goals

Jerzy Wilibald Krasówka (17 August 1924 – 11 April 2001) was a Polish footballer who played as a forward. He competed in the 1952 Summer Olympics.
