= 1950 Ekstraklasa =

24th season of top-tier football league in Poland

Liga
- Season: 1950
- Champions: Wisła Kraków (4th title)
- Relegated: Szombierki Bytom; Warta Poznań
- Top goalscorer: Teodor Anioła (20 goals)

Statistics of Ekstraklasa for the 1950 season.

== Overview ==
It was contested by 12 teams, and Wisła Kraków won the championship.

== League table ==
Pos	Team	Pld	W	D	L	GF	GA	GD	Pts
1	Gwardia Kraków (C)	22	16	1	5	51	17	+34	33
2	Unia Chorzów	22	14	4	4	50	24	+26	32
3	Lech Poznań	22	11	4	7	52	37	+15	26
4	KS Cracovia	22	9	5	8	32	29	+3	23
5	Górnik Radlin	22	10	3	9	33	31	+2	23
6	Garbarnia Kraków	22	9	5	8	38	39	−1	23
7	Polonia Warsaw	22	8	5	9	40	46	−6	21
8	AKS Chorzów	22	6	7	9	32	29	+3	19
9	ŁKS Łódź	22	8	3	11	36	46	−10	19
10	Legia Warsaw	22	7	4	11	38	40	−2	18
11	Szombierki Bytom (R)	22	7	4	11	33	64	−31	18
12	Warta Poznań (R)	22	2	5	15	18	51	−33	9

Source: 90minut.pl (in Polish)
(C) Champions; (R) Relegated

== Results ==
Home \ Away	AKS	CRA	GAR	GRA	LPO	LEG	ŁKS	PWA	RUC	SZB	WAR	WIS
AKS Chorzów		1–1	6–1	3–1	2–3	1–0	0–1	1–1	1–2	0–0	2–2	1–3
Cracovia	2–0		1–1	1–0	1–1	1–2	5–3	3–1	1–2	4–1	1–0	1–3
Garbarnia Kraków	0–0	1–2		2–0	4–1	1–2	1–0	3–2	1–1	4–0	4–1	1–0
Górnik Radlin	3–0	2–0	1–0		3–1	3–0	3–1	1–1	1–2	2–2	1–0	2–1
Lech Poznań	1–1	1–0	7–0	1–0		1–1	3–2	3–3	1–2	11–1	2–0	2–3
Legia Warsaw	1–2	2–3	2–2	3–5	0–1		2–1	2–2	0–3	8–3	3–0	0–2
ŁKS Łódź	1–1	2–0	3–2	2–0	0–3	3–2		3–1	1–4	2–2	3–0	1–0
Polonia Warsaw	0–3	1–1	5–1	4–0	1–3	2–1	4–3		3–1	1–3	4–1	2–1
Ruch Chorzów	2–0	2–3	1–2	3–0	5–1	1–1	1–1	4–1		3–0	4–0	0–0
Szombierki Bytom	2–1	2–1	0–4	3–2	1–2	1–3	4–2	1–0	2–3		3–1	0–5
Warta Poznań	0–6	0–0	2–2	1–1	4–2	0–2	4–1	0–1	1–2	1–1		0–2
Wisła Kraków	2–0	1–0	2–1	0–2	2–1	2–1	4–0	7–0	3–1	4–1	4–0	

Source: 90minut.pl (in Polish)
Legend: Blue = home team win; Yellow = draw; Red = away team win.

== Top goalscorers ==
Rank	Player	Club	Goals
1	(Poland) Teodor Anioła	Lech Poznań	20
2	(Poland) Stanisław Baran	ŁKS Łódź	18
2	(Poland) Gerard Cieślik	Ruch Chorzów	18
4	(Poland) Jerzy Krasówka	Szombierki Bytom	14
5	(Poland) Henryk Bożek	Garbarnia Kraków	13
6	(Poland) Józef Franke	Górnik Radlin	12
6	(Poland) Mieczysław Gracz	Wisła Kraków	12
6	(Poland) Józef Kohut	Wisła Kraków	12
6	(Poland) Mieczysław Nowak	Garbarnia Kraków	12
10	(Poland) Wacław Sąsiadek	Legia Warsaw	11
