= Henryk Bożek =

Polish footballer

Personal information
- Full name: Henryk Maksymilian Bozek
- Date of birth: 26 August 1924
- Place of birth: Mysłowice, Poland
- Date of death: 25 December 1994 (aged 70)
- Place of death: Gorlice, Poland
- Position: Forward

Youth career
- KS 06 Mysłowice

Senior career*
Years	Team	Apps	(Gls)
- Kolejarz Katowice
- Polonia Świdnica
1948–1960	Garbarnia Kraków		

International career
1950	Poland	2	(0)
- * Club domestic league appearances and goals

Henryk Maksymilian Bożek (26 August 1924 – 25 December 1994) was a Polish footballer who played as a forward.

He earned two caps for the Poland national team in 1950.
