= Wisła Kraków =

- Full name: Towarzystwo Sportowe Wisła Kraków Spółka Akcyjna
- Nickname: Biała Gwiazda (The White Star)
- Founded: 1906; 120 years ago
- Ground: Synerise Arena Kraków
- Capacity: 33,326
- Owners: Jarosław Królewski (50.10%); Jakub Błaszczykowski (13.90%); Adam Łanoszka (13,89%); Peter Moore (4.83%); Adam Adamczyk (3,62%); Władysław Nowak (3,62%); Jacek Piątek (2.13%); others (7.9 %)
- President: Jarosław Królewski
- Manager: Mariusz Jop
- League: Ekstraklasa
- 2025–26: I liga, 1st of 18 (promoted)
- Website: www.wislakrakow.com
Home colours	Away colours	Anniversary colours

Towarzystwo Sportowe Wisła Kraków Spółka Akcyjna, commonly referred to as Wisła Kraków (Polish pronunciation: [ˈviswa ˈkrakuf]), is a Polish professional football club based in Kraków. They compete in the Ekstraklasa following promotion from the 2025–26 I liga. It ranks fourth in the number of national titles won (13), behind Górnik Zabrze, Ruch Chorzów (both on 14), and Legia Warsaw (15), and second in all-time victories. Wisła was founded in 1906 under the name TS Wisła (Polish: Towarzystwo Sportowe Wisła). The team plays its home matches at the Synerise Arena Kraków.

The club's coat of arms is a red crest crossed by a blue ribbon, with a white star centered on top.

Wisła Kraków was one of the most successful Polish football clubs of 2000s, winning eight league championships since 1999. Along with league titles, Wisła also won the Polish Cup on five occasions, including the first-ever edition in 1926, and are the current cup holders. Wisła also enjoyed some success in European competitions in the 1970s, reaching the quarter-finals in the 1978–79 European Cup.

== History ==
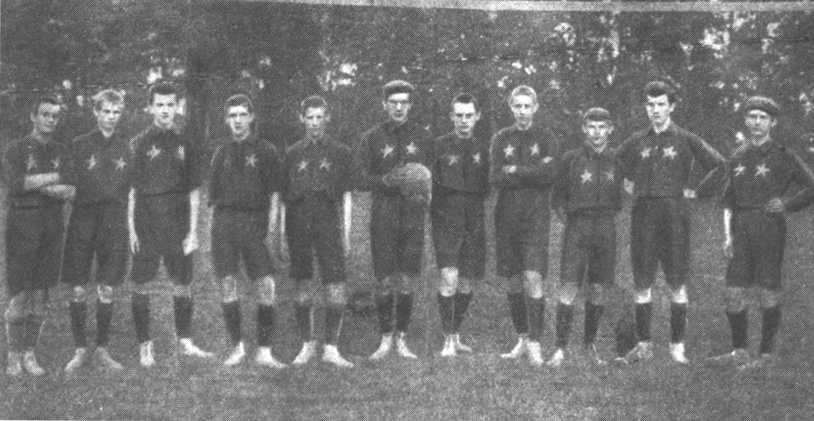
1907 Wisła Kraków side

Wisła Kraków was founded in 1906 when students of the Second Practical School in Kraków, inspired by their professor Tadeusz Łopuszański, formed a football club.

In this first, historic season of the League, the fight for the championship was decided between two teams: Wisła Kraków and 1. FC Kattowitz. This rivalry was treated very seriously, not only by the two sides involved, but also by the whole nation. 1. FC was regarded as the team supported by the German minority, while Wisła, at the end of this historic season, represented ambitions of all Poles.

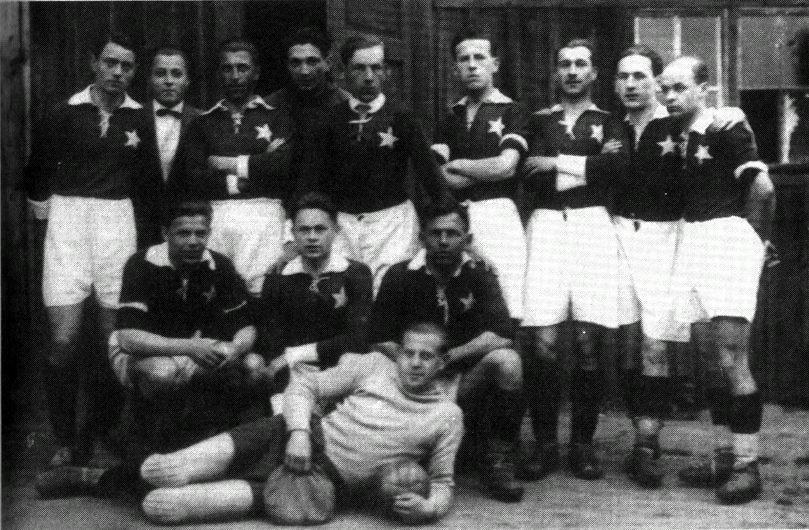
1927 Wisła Kraków side.

Some time in the fall of 1927 in Katowice, an ill-fated game between 1.FC and Wisła took place. Stakes were very high – the winner would become the Champion. Kraków's side won 2–0 and became the Champion. 1.FC finished second, third was Warta Poznań.

During the German occupation of Poland (World War II), the club operated secretly. Co-founder Franciszek Brożek and pre-war player Adam Obrubański were among Poles murdered by the Russians in the large Katyn massacre in April–May 1940.

In 1949, the club was renamed to Gwardia-Wisła Kraków. In 1955 the club returned to its original name, TS Wisła. In 1967, the club was once again renamed, to GTS Wisła, a name which held until 1990 when the club reverted to its original name, TS Wisła. In the late 1990s, the football section of the club was incorporated and was renamed Wisła Kraków SSA.

The club has had its ups and downs, winning national championships and earning European qualification. It was also relegated to the second division on three occasions. Since the football section has been bought by Tele-Fonika Kable S.A. in 1998, the team has been far and away the most successful club in Poland, winning seven national championships and finishing in second place three times, totalling ten top two finishes in 12 years.

At international level, Wisła has competed in all three of the European competitions. The club's greatest success came in the 1978–79 season, when Wisła was able to reach the quarter-finals of the European Cup, eventually to be knocked out by Malmö FF 3–5 on aggregate. Most recently, Wisła narrowly missed out on a chance to compete in the 2005–06 UEFA Champions League group stage, being defeated 4–5 by Panathinaikos after extra time.

Wisła also twice reached the second round of the European Cup Winners' Cup in 1967–68 and 1984–85, falling 0–5 and 2–3 by Hamburger SV and Fortuna Sittard, respectively. The White Star has competed in the UEFA Cup ten times.

On 15 May 2022, Wisła was relegated to the I liga for the first time since 1996, after losing 4–2 against Radomiak Radom.

On 2 May 2024, they won their fifth Polish Cup title after defeating Pogoń Szczecin 1–2 in extra time, becoming the fifth second division team to win this competition, and the first since Ruch Chorzów in 1996. Despite winning the cup, the White Star finished only 10th in the I liga – the lowest league placement in the club's entire history, considering the overall Polish football hierarchy. The result surpassed the club's previous historic low from 1987, when Wisła finished fourth in the second group of the second division. The 2023–24 campaign also marked the seventh consecutive season in which the club failed to improve its league position, setting another unwanted record, as no other major Polish club had previously endured such a prolonged run without league progression.

In the 2025–26 season, Wisła ended its four-year spell in the second tier and secured promotion back to the Ekstraklasa. Promotion was sealed on 8 May 2026 with a 2–0 victory over Chrobry Głogów.

Wisła's stay in the I liga between 2022 and 2026 became the longest absence from the top tier league in the club's 120-year history. Although regarded as one of the darkest and most difficult periods in the club's history, the era also saw major organizational and commercial transformation under owner Jarosław Królewski. During these years, Wisła strengthened its media presence and commercial reach, attracted new sponsors and partners, expanded its use of data-driven football analysis and technological infrastructure, and collaborated with former Liverpool and EA Sports executive Peter Moore in advisory and promotional roles. The club consistently recorded some of the highest attendances in Polish football, surpassing most Ekstraklasa teams despite competing in the second tier, while its matches regularly generated record television audiences for the I liga. The era also cemented the status of Spanish forward Ángel Rodado as one of the club's modern icons, while a growing number of academy graduates established themselves in the first team. Wisła returned to the Ekstraklasa in 2026 under manager Mariusz Jop, concluding a period that significantly reshaped the club's sporting and institutional identity.

== Stadium ==
Henryk Reyman Stadium, currently known as Synerise Arena Kraków for sponsorship reasons, is located at 22 Reymonta Street in Kraków. The stadium was originally built in 1953 and currently has a capacity of 33,326. The stadium was renovated in 2010, being upgraded to UEFA elite standards. The Wisła Stadium was also chosen as a reserve venue for the UEFA Euro 2012 tournament, jointly held in Poland and Ukraine. The record attendance of 45,000 at Wisła Stadium came on 29 September 1976 when Wisła defeated Celtic 2–0. The venue has been a fortress for Wisła, where the team is especially difficult to defeat. Wisła holds the all-time Polish football record for consecutive league home games without a loss. The streak began following a loss on 16 September 2001 to KSZO Ostrowiec Świętokrzyski, and ended more than five years later on 11 November 2006, when GKS Bełchatów defeated Wisła 4–2. The number of matches without a loss was then settled at 73, overcoming the former Polish record of 48 which belonged to Legia Warsaw. During the 2008–09 season, Wisła lost points at home only twice, drawing with ŁKS Łódź and being defeated by Lech Poznań.

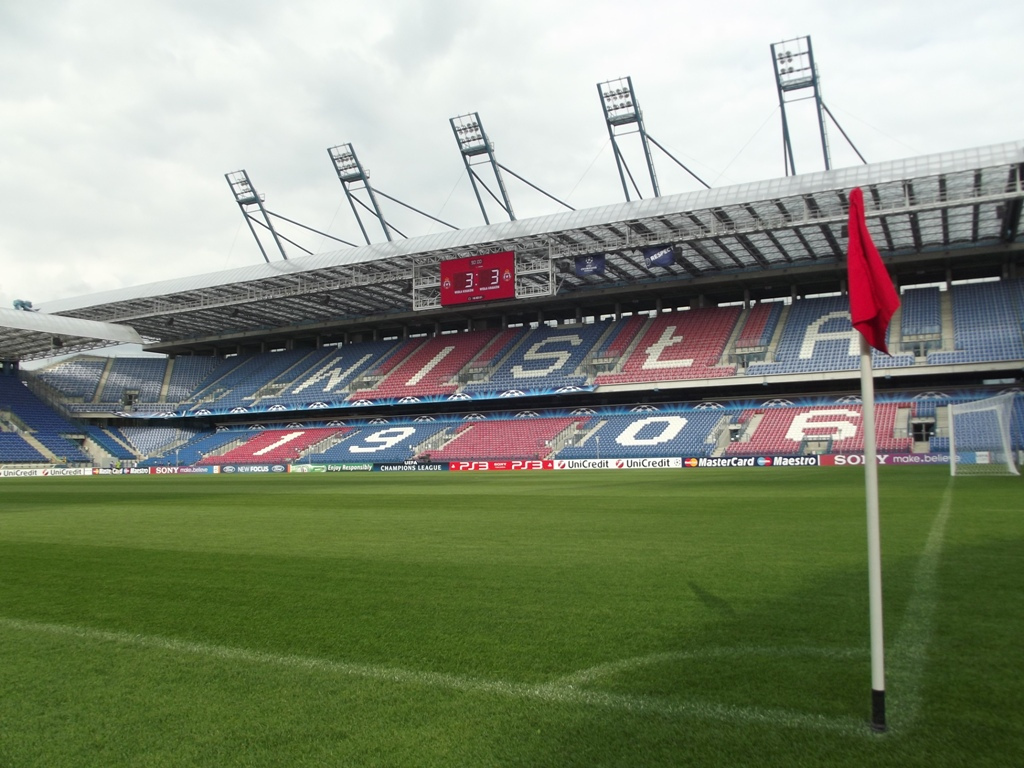
Stadium

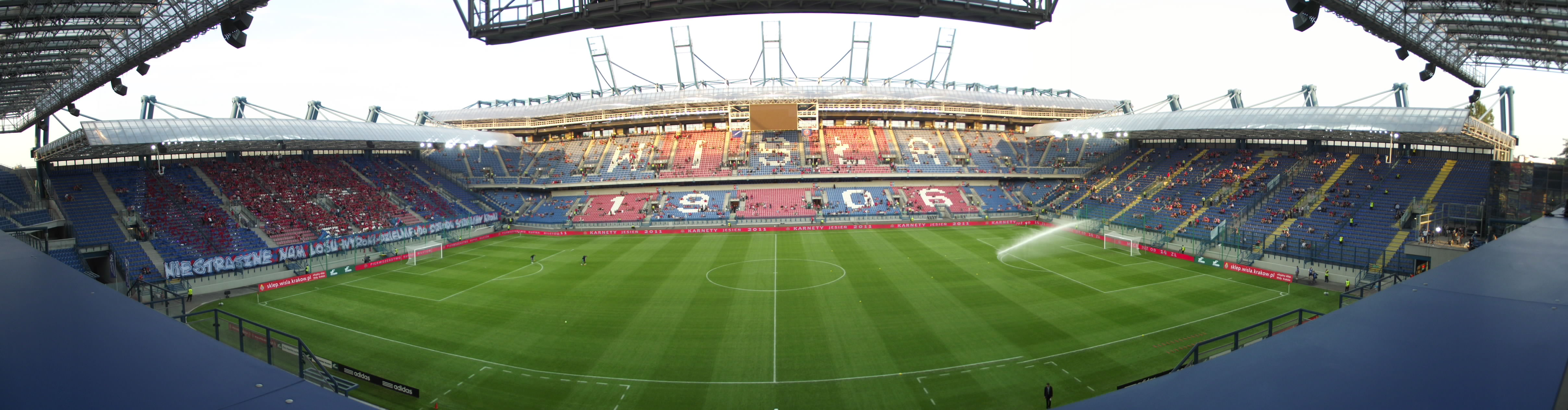
Full view of the stadium

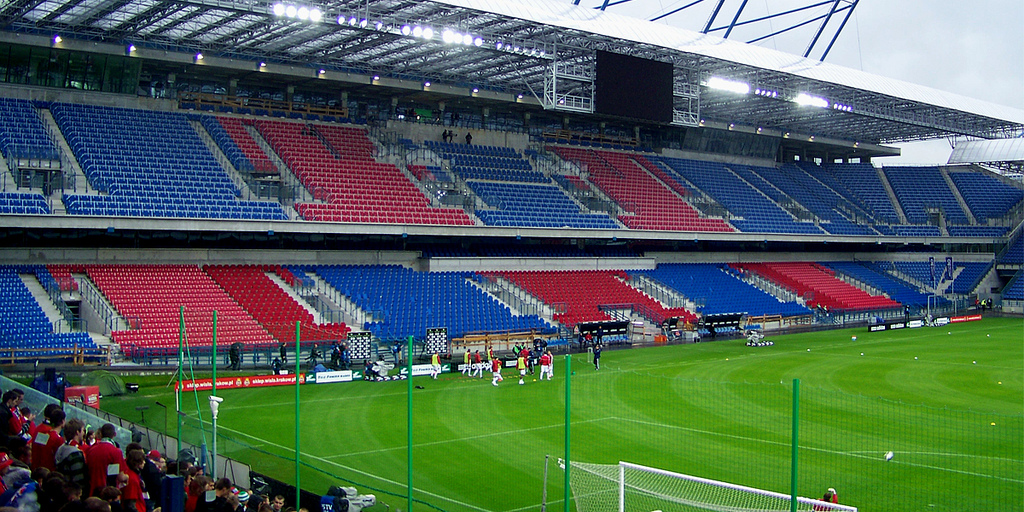
West VIP stand

== Supporters and rivalries ==
=== Fan friendlies ===
Wisła fans formerly had long friendships relations with Lechia Gdańsk and Śląsk Wrocław, known as the "Three Kings of Great Cities" alliance until 2016, when their alliance fell apart. They formed a new group with Ruch Chorzów and Widzew Łódź (and by extension Elana Toruń, Slovan Bratislava and KKS Kalisz), which divided Wisła fans.

The fans have an amicable relationship with Polonia Przemyśl. Although Garbarnia Kraków, Puszcza Niepołomice and Kmita Zabierzów have no organised fan movements they are known to have local Wisła fans attend their games. Kmita was founded initially as Wisła Zabierzów as a local branch of the Wisła sports club.

The club also has close relations with Italian side Lazio since their Rome derby match in 2015.

The fans formerly held relations with Unia Tarnów, Jagiellonia Białystok, Siarka Tarnobrzeg, Resovia Rzeszów and Zagłębie Wałbrzych.

=== Rivalries ===
==== With Cracovia ====
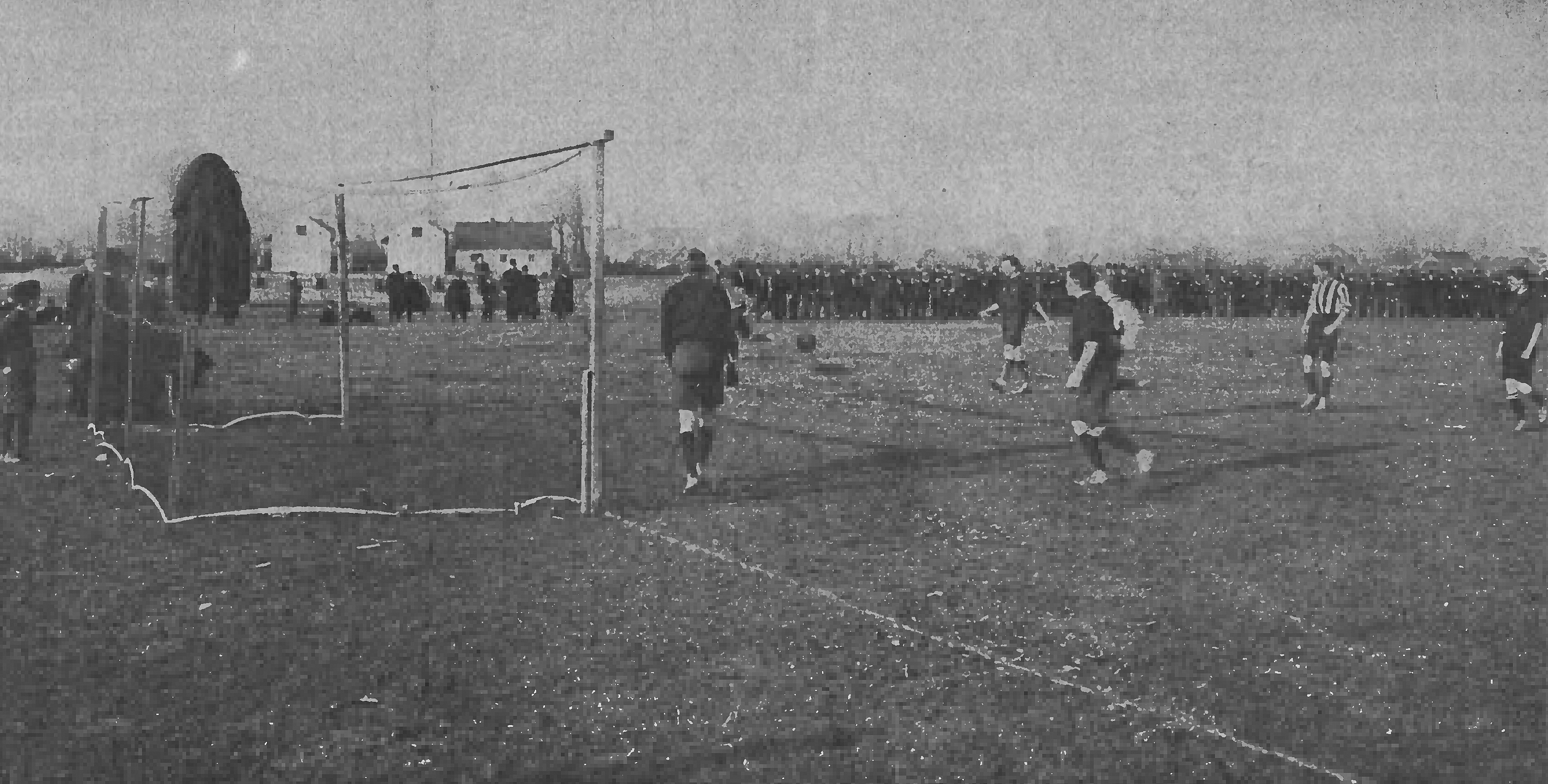
Friendly match with KS Cracovia in 1909

The term "Holy War" refers to the intense rivalry between the two Kraków-based teams; Wisła and KS Cracovia, one of the oldest and most violent football rivalries in Central Europe. Originating in 1906 with the creation of Kraków's first football clubs, the rivalry quickly evolved beyond sport and became deeply rooted in local identity, social divisions and supporter culture. The term "Holy War" was first used to describe the rivalry of Kraków's Jewish teams, Makkabi and Jutrzenka. A Jutrzenka defender, Ludwik Gintel, who later joined the Cracovia side referred to the derby match against Wisła as the "Holy War". The phrase was incorporated into a song and has since been popular amongst both Wisła and Cracovia fans.

The first recorded Kraków Derby was contested on 20 September 1908 and ended in a 1–1 draw. One of the earliest landmark meetings came on 8 May 1913, when Cracovia defeated Wisła 2–1 in what is regarded as the first officially sanctioned Polish championship match recognized by FIFA. Another iconic encounter took place on 5 December 1948, when the clubs finished level on points after the first post-war season and met in a title-deciding play-off at a neutral venue, won 3–1 by Cracovia. The rivalry also produced numerous symbolic moments beyond league competition, including the annual "Herbowa Tarcza Krakowa" matches played in the 1970s, which regularly attracted huge crowds despite the clubs competing in different divisions. As of May 2022, the Kraków derby game between Wisła and Cracovia has been contested 203 times, with Wisła winning 91 times, tying 48 times and Cracovia winning 64 times.

The rivalry between Wisła and Cracovia is one of the oldest and most culturally significant in Polish football. The fixture reflects not only sporting competition, but also deep historical, social and identity-based divisions within Kraków. A long-standing symbolic dispute concerns which club should be recognized as the oldest football club in Kraków. Both Wisła and Cracovia trace their origins to spring 1906, but the question remains difficult to resolve conclusively due to contradictory archival material, disputed interpretations of early organizational activity and the fragmented nature of surviving historical records. The issue remains unresolved and continues to form part of the derby's mythology.

From the 1990s through the 2010s, the rivalry became infamous far beyond football due to the extreme violence of hooligan groups associated with both clubs. Clashes involving Wisła Sharks and Cracovia-affiliated firms frequently involved knives, machetes, axes and baseball bats, while murders, retaliatory attacks and organized ambushes linked to the conflict repeatedly shocked Poland. Among the most notorious incidents was the 2011 daylight killing of senior Cracovia hooligan Tomasz "Człowiek" C., who was rammed off the road in Kraków's Kurdwanów district before being attacked by over a dozen masked men armed with machetes and clubs.

==== With Legia Warsaw ====
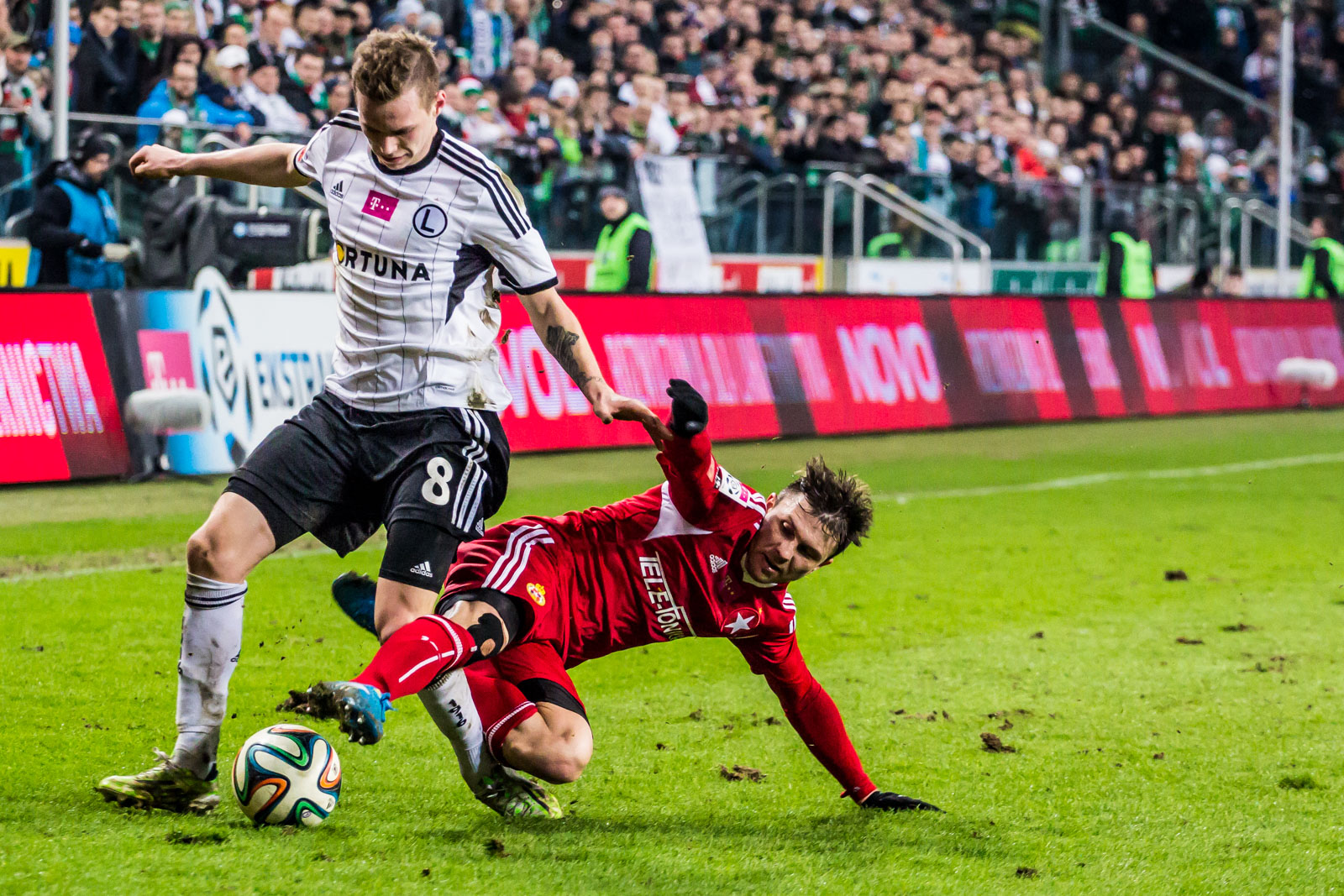
Away game with Legia Warsaw in the 2014–15 Ekstraklasa

The match contested between Wisła Kraków and Legia Warsaw, dubbed the "Derby of Poland", is commonly recognized as one of the greatest rivalries in Polish club football. Historically, the two sides have been among the most successful and widely supported clubs in the country, occupying leading positions in the all-time Ekstraklasa table. The rivalry is further intensified by the historic and cultural competition between Kraków and Warsaw, Poland's former and current capitals respectively. One of the most infamous matches between the two clubs took place on 16 June 2001, when Wisła defeated Legia 2–1 in Warsaw to secure the Polish championship. The match was overshadowed by major crowd disturbances, including riots, stone-throwing and a fire that damaged significant part of Legia's stadium at Łazienkowska Street. The events became deeply embedded in Wisła supporters' culture and were later referenced in the famous fan chant "Biała Gwiazda na niebie się mieni", whose lyrics include the line "Płonie ognisko na Łazienkowskiej, stadion Legii pali się..." ("A fire burns at Łazienkowska, Legia's stadium is burning...").

==== With Hutnik Kraków ====
The other Kraków derby is contested against Hutnik, historically the third team in Kraków representing Nowa Huta. Owing to Hutnik's lack of recent sporting success, the rivalry is mostly off-pitch and with Wisla's reserve team or in other sports sections of both clubs.

A notable recent example occurred in the 2025 Polish Cup Round of 16, played at Hutnik's ground, where Wisła won 1–0. The match itself was overshadowed by incidents in the stands: home supporters burned Wisła scarves, displayed offensive banners and used explicit anti-rival symbolism, prompting security interventions and subsequent disciplinary proceedings by the Polish Football Association.

==== Other rivalries ====
Other rivalries are with Lech Poznań, Arka Gdynia and Tarnovia Tarnów, an extension of the fierce rivalry with Cracovia as all three maintain aliance with them.

Fans of Zagłębie Sosnowiec, Korona Kielce, GKS Katowice, and Polonia Warsaw are also inter-regional fierce rivals.

== Other teams ==
In addition to the professional team, Wisła Kraków also runs a reserve team, currently playing in group IV of the III liga, and youth teams competing in the Central Junior League.

== Current squad ==
As of 8 September 2026

Note: Flags indicate national team as defined under FIFA eligibility rules; some limited exceptions apply. Players may hold more than one non-FIFA nationality.

No.	Pos.	Nation	Player
1	GK	POL	Marcel Łubik (on loan from Augsburg)
2	DF	NED	Julian Lelieveld
4	DF	POL	Rafał Mikulec
6	DF	POL	Alan Uryga (captain)
7	MF	AUT	Julius Ertlthaler
8	MF	ESP	Marc Carbó
9	FW	ESP	Ángel Rodado (vice-captain)
10	FW	POR	Frederico Duarte
12	MF	NGR	James Igbekeme
13	DF	FRA	Maxence Maisonneuve
17	FW	AUT	Marko Božić
21	FW	SUI	Jérémy Guillemenot
23	MF	ESP	Víctor Meseguer
27	FW	FRA	Élie Youan

No.	Pos.	Nation	Player
28	GK	POL	Patryk Letkiewicz
29	DF	AUT	Darijo Grujčić
30	FW	POL	Karol Tokarczyk
31	MF	UKR	Maksym Tsymbalyuk
32	MF	POL	Oliwier Pławiński
34	DF	SUI	Raoul Giger
41	MF	POL	Kacper Duda (3rd captain)
50	DF	POL	Mariusz Kutwa
51	FW	POL	Maciej Kuziemka
52	DF	POL	Jakub Krzyżanowski
53	GK	POL	Jakub Stępak
93	GK	POL	Bartosz Neugebauer
97	DF	POL	Wiktor Biedrzycki

=== Other players under contract ===
Note: Flags indicate national team as defined under FIFA eligibility rules; some limited exceptions apply. Players may hold more than one non-FIFA nationality.

No.	Pos.	Nation	Player
18	MF	POL	Bartosz Talar
19	MF	POL	Olivier Sukiennicki
22	FW	POL	Piotr Starzyński

No.	Pos.	Nation	Player
25	DF	POL	Bartosz Jaroch
—	FW	GUI	Oumar Conté
—	MF	POL	Karol Dziedzic

=== Out on loan ===
Note: Flags indicate national team as defined under FIFA eligibility rules; some limited exceptions apply. Players may hold more than one non-FIFA nationality.

No.	Pos.	Nation	Player
15	MF	POL	Wiktor Staszak (at Chrobry Głogów until 30 June 2027)
20	MF	AUT	Ervin Omić (at CFR Cluj until 30 June 2027)

No.	Pos.	Nation	Player
56	FW	POL	Filip Baniowski (at Podhale Nowy Targ until 30 June 2027)
57	FW	POL	Szymon Kawała (at Sandecja Nowy Sącz until 30 June 2027)

== Coaching staff ==
As of 26 June 2026

Manager	(Poland) Mariusz Jop
Assistant coaches	(Poland) Bartosz Bąk (Poland) Kazimierz Kmiecik (Spain) Eric Lira (Poland) Michał Siwierski
Analyst coach	(Poland) Krzysztof Siłka
Physical performance coach	(Poland) Kazimierz Piechnik
Strength and conditioning coach	(Poland) Karol Baran
Goalkeeping coach	(Poland) Łukasz Załuska
Physiotherapists	(Poland) Bartłomiej Grzegorczyk (Poland) Ryszard Polak (Poland) Marcin Sapalski
Team doctor	(Poland) Mariusz Urban
Team manager	(Poland) Daniel Bigaj
Kit manager	(Poland) Jakub Bujas

== Sponsors ==
=== Current ===
Placement/type	Sponsor name
Technical	Kappa
Strategic	Superbet
Shirt	JD Sports
Shirt	Synerise
Shirt	Wienkra
Shorts	Szubryt
Others	LukTrans
Others	PRODiM
Others	Socios Wisła
Others	Volvo Wadowscy

=== Main shirt sponsors ===
Years	Sponsor
–1991	Pepsi
1991–1992	Lotto
1994–1997	Unimil
1998–2003	Tele-Fonika Kable
2003–2005	Era
2005–2007	Tyskie
2007–2009	Tele-Fonika Kable
2009–2010	Bet-at-home.com
2010–2016	Tele-Fonika Kable
2017–2019	LV Bet
2019–2021	LV Bet / Socios Wisła
2021–2023	Orlen Oil / Socios Wisła
2023–2024	Orlen Oil / Texom
2024–2026	Texom
2026–	Superbet / Wienkra

=== Kit manufacturers ===
Years	Manufacturer
–1994	(Germany) Adidas
1995–1996	(Denmark) Hummel
1996–1998	(Germany) Uhlsport
1998–1999	(Germany) Adidas
2000–2005	(United States) Nike
2005–2010	(United Kingdom) Umbro
2010–2020	(Germany) Adidas
2020–2025	(Italy) Macron
2025–	(Italy) Kappa

== Honours ==
=== Domestic ===
- Ekstraklasa
  - Champions: 1927, 1928, 1949, 1950, 1951, (Note: (In 1951 Wisła was league champion, however, the Polish Championship title was awarded to the Cup winner, Ruch Chorzów)) 1977–78, 1998–99, 2000–01, 2002–03, 2003–04, 2004–05, 2007–08, 2008–09, 2010–11
  - Runners-up: 1930, 1931, 1936, 1948, 1965–66, 1980–81, 1999–2000, 2001–02, 2005–06, 2009–10
- Polish non-League Football Championship:
  - Runners-up: 1923, 1947
- I liga
  - Champions: 1964–65, 2025–26
  - Runners-up: 1985–86, 1988–89, 1995–96
- Galician Championship
  - 2nd place: 1913
- Polish Cup
  - Winners: 1926-27, 1966–67, 2001–02, 2002–03, 2023–24
  - Runners-up: 1950–51, 1953–54, 1978–79, 1983–84, 1999–2000, 2007–08
- Polish Super Cup
  - Winners: 2001
  - Runners-up: 1999, 2004, 2008, 2009
- Polish League Cup
  - Winners : 2000–01
  - Runners-up: 2001–02

=== Europe ===
- European Cup/UEFA Champions League
  - Quarterfinal: 1978–79
- UEFA Cup/UEFA Europa League
  - Round of 16: 2002–03
- European Cup Winners' Cup
  - Round of 16: 1967–68, 1984–85
- Intertoto Cup
  - Winners: 1969, 1970, 1973

=== Youth teams ===
- Młoda Ekstraklasa
  - Champions: 2007–08
  - Runners-up: 2008–09
- Polish U-19 Championship
  - Champions: 1936, 1937, 1958, 1975, 1976, 1982, 1996, 1997, 2000, 2014
  - Runners-up: 1938
- Polish U-17 Championship
  - Champions: 2013
  - Runners-up: 2003

== Records ==
Team records

- Biggest win: 21–0 (8–0) – in Polish Championship elimination match with Pogoń Siedlce in Kraków, 24 August 1947.
- Highest home attendance: 45,000 – Wisła Kraków 2–0 (Scotland) Celtic (UEFA Cup), 29 September 1976.
- Highest home league attendance: 40,000 – Wisła Kraków 2–1 Legia Warszawa (Polish league), 7 August 1977.
- Debut in the league: 3 April 1927 in the first in league history.
- In the table of all time: 2nd place
- Consecutive matches without defeat in the league: 38 (25 October 2003 – 22 May 2005) – a record in the league
- Consecutive home matches without defeat: 73 (16 September 2001 – 11 November 2006) – a record in the league
- Biggest win in European competition: (Georgia (country)) WIT Georgia Tbilisi 2:8 Wisła Kraków, in Georgia, 27 July 2004. Wisła Kraków 7–0 (Wales) Newtown, in Kraków, 29 July 1998.

Records individual

- Top scorer in the league: (Poland) Kazimierz Kmiecik – 153 goals in 304 matches
- Top scorer in the second league: (Poland) Grzegorz Kaliciak – 32 goals
- Top scorer (total): (Poland) Kazimierz Kmiecik – 181 goals in 350 matches
- Top scorer in European competition: (Poland) Maciej Żurawski – 23 goals
- Most matches in European Cups: (Poland) Marcin Baszczyński – 52 games
- Most meetings (total): (Poland) Arkadiusz Głowacki – 461 games
- The youngest debut: (Poland) Stefan Śliwa – 14 years, 268 days
- The oldest player: (Poland) Marcin Wasilewski – 40 years 39 days
- Most matches in the Poland national team: Antoni Szymanowski – 65 games (a total of 82 games in the national team)
- Most goals in the Poland national team: Maciej Żurawski – 14 goals
- Top scorer in one season: (Poland) Mieczysław Gracz and (Poland) Maciej Żurawski – 38 goals (all meetings), (Poland) Henryk Reyman – 37 goals (league only)
- All records

== Wisła in European football ==
- Q = Qualifying
- PO = Play-Off
- Group = Group stage
- R32 = Round of 32
- QF = Quarter final

Season	Competition	Round		Club	Score	Aggregate
1967–68	European Cup Winners' Cup	1	(Finland)	HJK Helsinki	4–1, 4–0	8–1
1967–68	European Cup Winners' Cup	2	(Germany)	Hamburger SV	0–1, 0–4	0–5
1976–77	UEFA Cup	1	(Scotland)	Celtic	2–2, 2–0	4–2
1976–77	UEFA Cup	2	(Belgium)	Molenbeek	1–1, 1–1	1–1 (4–5 p)
1978–79	European Cup	1	(Belgium)	Club Brugge	1–2, 3–1	4–3
1978–79	European Cup	2	(Czechoslovakia)	Zbrojovka Brno	2–2, 1–1	3–3 (a)
1978–79	European Cup	QF	(Sweden)	Malmö FF	2–1, 1–4	3–5
1981–82	UEFA Cup	1	(Sweden)	Malmö FF	0–2, 1–3	1–5
1984–85	UEFA Cup Winners' Cup	1	(Iceland)	ÍBV	4–2, 3–1	7–3
1984–85	UEFA Cup Winners' Cup	2	(Netherlands)	Fortuna Sittard	0–2, 2–1	2–3
1998–99	UEFA Cup	1Q	(Wales)	Newtown	0–0, 7–0	7–0
1998–99	UEFA Cup	2Q	(Turkey)	Trabzonspor	5–1, 2–1	7–1
1998–99	UEFA Cup	1	(Slovenia)	Maribor	2–0, 3–0	5–0
1998–99	UEFA Cup	2	(Italy)	Parma	1–1, 1–2	2–3
2000–01	UEFA Cup	Q	(Bosnia and Herzegovina)	Željezničar Sarajevo	0–0, 3–1	3–1
2000–01	UEFA Cup	1	(Spain)	Real Zaragoza	1–4, 4–1	5–5 (4–3 p)
2000–01	UEFA Cup	2	(Portugal)	Porto	0–0, 0–3	0–3
2001–02	UEFA Champions League	2Q	(Latvia)	Skonto	2–1, 1–0	3–1
2001–02	UEFA Champions League	3Q	(Spain)	Barcelona	3–4, 0–1	3–5
2001–02	UEFA Cup	1	(Croatia)	Hajduk Split	2–2, 1–0	3–2
2001–02	UEFA Cup	2	(Italy)	Internazionale	0–2, 1–0	1–2
2002–03	UEFA Cup	Q	(Northern Ireland)	Glentoran	2–0, 4–0	6–0
2002–03	UEFA Cup	1	(Slovenia)	Primorje	2–0, 6–1	8–1
2002–03	UEFA Cup	2	(Italy)	Parma	1–2, 4–1	5–3
2002–03	UEFA Cup	3	(Germany)	Schalke 04	1–1, 4–1	5–2
2002–03	UEFA Cup	4	(Italy)	Lazio	3–3, 1–2	4–5
2003–04	UEFA Champions League	2Q	(Cyprus)	Omonia	5–2, 2–2	7–4
2003–04	UEFA Champions League	3Q	(Belgium)	Anderlecht	1–3, 0–1	1–4
2003–04	UEFA Cup	1	(Netherlands)	NEC	2–1, 2–1	4–2
2003–04	UEFA Cup	2	(Norway)	Vålerenga	0–0, 0–0	0–0 (3–4 p)
2004–05	UEFA Champions League	2Q	(Georgia (country))	WIT Georgia	8–2, 3–0	11–2
2004–05	UEFA Champions League	3Q	(Spain)	Real Madrid	0–2, 1–3	1–5
2004–05	UEFA Cup	1	(Georgia (country))	Dinamo Tbilisi	4–3, 1–2	5–5 (a)
2005–06	UEFA Champions League	3Q	(Greece)	Panathinaikos	3–1, 1–4	4–5
2005–06	UEFA Cup	1	(Portugal)	Vitória de Guimarães	0–3, 0–1	0–4
2006–07	UEFA Cup	2Q	(Austria)	SV Mattersburg	1–1, 1–0	2–1
2006–07	UEFA Cup	1	(Greece)	Iraklis	0–1, 2–0	2–1
2006–07	UEFA Cup	Group	(England)	Blackburn Rovers	1–2	4th
2006–07	UEFA Cup	Group	(France)	Nancy	1–2	4th
2006–07	UEFA Cup	Group	(Switzerland)	Basel	3–1	4th
2006–07	UEFA Cup	Group	(Netherlands)	Feyenoord	1–3	4th
2008–09	UEFA Champions League	2Q	(Israel)	Beitar Jerusalem	1–2, 5–0	6–2
2008–09	UEFA Champions League	3Q	(Spain)	Barcelona	0–4, 1–0	1–4
2008–09	UEFA Cup	1	(England)	Tottenham Hotspur	1–2, 1–1	2–3
2009–10	UEFA Champions League	2Q	(Estonia)	Levadia Tallinn	1–1, 0–1	1–2
2010–11	UEFA Europa League	2Q	(Lithuania)	Šiauliai	2–0, 5–0	7–0
2010–11	UEFA Europa League	3Q	(Azerbaijan)	Qarabağ	0–1, 2–3	2–4
2011–12	UEFA Champions League	2Q	(Latvia)	Skonto	1–0, 2–0	3–0
2011–12	UEFA Champions League	3Q	(Bulgaria)	Litex Lovech	2–1, 3–1	5–2
2011–12	UEFA Champions League	PO	(Cyprus)	APOEL	1–0, 1–3	2–3
2011–12	UEFA Europa League	Group	(Netherlands)	Twente	1–4, 2–1	2nd
2011–12	UEFA Europa League	Group	(England)	Fulham	1–0, 1–4	2nd
2011–12	UEFA Europa League	Group	(Denmark)	OB	1–3, 2–1	2nd
2011–12	UEFA Europa League	R32	(Belgium)	Standard Liège	1–1, 0–0	1–1 (a)
2024–25	UEFA Europa League	1Q	(Kosovo)	Llapi	2–0, 2–1	4–1
2024–25	UEFA Europa League	2Q	(Austria)	Rapid Wien	1–2, 1–6	2–8
2024–25	UEFA Conference League	3Q	(Slovakia)	Spartak Trnava	1–3, 3–1	4–4 (12–11 p)
2024–25	UEFA Conference League	PO	(Belgium)	Cercle Brugge	1–6, 4–1	5–7

=== Best results in European competitions ===
Season	Achievement	Notes
European Cup/UEFA Champions League
1978–79	Quarter-final	lost to (Sweden) Malmö 2–1 in Kraków, 1–4 in Malmö
UEFA Cup Winners' Cup
1967–68	Round of 16	lost to (West Germany) Hamburger SV 0–1 in Kraków, 0–4 in Hamburg
1984–85	Round of 16	lost to (Netherlands) Fortuna Sittard 0–2 in Sittard, 2–1 in Kraków
UEFA Cup/UEFA Europa League
2002–03	Round of 16	lost to (Italy) Lazio 3–3 in Rome, 1–2 in Kraków
UEFA Conference League
2024–25	Play-off	lost to (Belgium) Cercle Brugge 1–6 in Kraków, 4–1 in Bruges

== Notable players ==
Had international caps for their respective countries. Players whose name is listed in bold represented their countries while playing for Wisła.

Poland

- (Poland) **Józef Adamek** (1919–33)
- (Poland) **Mieczysław Balcer** (1923–35)
- (Poland) **Marcin Baszczyński** (2000–09)
- (Poland) **Jakub Błaszczykowski** (2005–07), (2019–23)
- (Poland) **Jacek Bobrowicz** (1989–94)
- (Poland) **Rafał Boguski** (2005–21)
- (Poland) **Paweł Brożek** (1998–2010), (2013–20)
- (Poland) **Piotr Brożek** (1998–2010), (2013–14)
- (Poland) Krzysztof Budka (1975–85)
- (Poland) **Ryszard Budka** (1955–68)
- (Poland) **Krzysztof Bukalski** (1998–2001)
- (Poland) Franciszek Cebulak (1923)
- (Poland) Radosław Cierzniak (2015)
- (Poland) **Ryszard Czerwiec** (1998–2002)
- (Poland) **Stanisław Czulak** (1923–33)
- (Poland) Piotr Ćwielong (2007–10)
- (Poland) Tomasz Dawidowski (2004–09)
- (Poland) **Dariusz Dudka** (2005–08), (2014–15)
- (Poland) **Tomasz Dziubiński** (1989–91)
- (Poland) **Michał Filek** (1933–49)
- (Poland) **Stanisław Flanek** (1946–54)
- (Poland) **Tomasz Frankowski** (1998–2005)
- (Poland) Łukasz Garguła (2009–15)
- (Poland) **Witold Gieras** (1920–23), (1924–28)
- (Poland) **Władysław Giergiel** (1939), (1946–49)
- (Poland) **Arkadiusz Głowacki** (2000–10), (2012–18)
- (Poland) Konrad Gołoś (2005–10)
- (Poland) **Damian Gorawski** (2003–04)
- (Poland) **Mieczysław Gracz** (1933–53)
- (Poland) **Bolesław Habowski** (1933–38)
- (Poland) Krzysztof Hausner (1968–70)
- (Poland) Zbigniew Hnatio (1970–71)
- (Poland) **Andrzej Iwan** (1976–85)
- (Poland) **Jan Jałocha** (1969–86)
- (Poland) **Marcin Jałocha** (1987–92)
- (Poland) **Zdzisław Janik** (1989–93)
- (Poland) Maciej Jankowski (2014–15)
- (Poland) **Zbigniew Jaskowski** (1945–55)
- (Poland) **Mariusz Jop** (1999–2004), (2009–10)
- (Poland) **Jerzy Jurowicz** (1933–55)
- (Poland) **Kazimierz Kaczor** (1913–27)
- (Poland) Paweł Kaczorowski (2006)
- (Poland) **Grzegorz Kaliciak** (1992–96), (1998–2003)
- (Poland) **Radosław Kałużny** (1998–2001)
- (Poland) **Zdzisław Kapka** (1968–83), (1987)
- (Poland) Jan Karwecki (1978–80)
- (Poland) **Władysław Kawula** (1951–71)
- (Poland) **Marian Kiliński** (1922–33)
- (Poland) **Walerian Kisieliński** (1930–32)
- (Poland) **Tomasz Kłos** (2004–06)
- (Poland) **Kazimierz Kmiecik** (1968–82)
- (Poland) Adam Kogut (1918–19)
- (Poland) **Józef Kohut** (1948–54)
- (Poland) **Adam Kokoszka** (2005–08)
- (Poland) Marek Koniarek (1997)
- (Poland) Tadeusz Konkiewicz (1923–25)
- (Poland) **Kamil Kosowski** (1999–2008), (2013)
- (Poland) **Jan Kotlarczyk** (1925–36)
- (Poland) **Józef Kotlarczyk** (1927–39)
- (Poland) **Jacek Kowalczyk** (2004–06)
- (Poland) **Władysław Kowalski** (1923–30)
- (Poland) **Maksymilian Koźmin** (1927–36)
- (Poland) **Władysław Krupa** (1921–27)
- (Poland) Paweł Kryszałowicz (2005–06)
- (Poland) **Mariusz Kukiełka** (2004)
- (Poland) **Tomasz Kulawik** (1991–2002)
- (Poland) **Marek Kusto** (1972–77)
- (Poland) **Marcin Kuźba** (2002–03), (2004–06)
- (Poland) **Grzegorz Lewandowski** (1989–93)
- (Poland) **Leszek Lipka** (1976–90)
- (Poland) **Wojciech Łobodziński** (2008–11)
- (Poland) **Antoni Łyko** (1930–39)
- (Poland) **Marian Machowski** (1950–63)
- (Poland) **Henryk Maculewicz** (1971–79)
- (Poland) **Edward Madejski** (1933–37)
- (Poland) Radosław Majdan (2004–06)
- (Poland) **Bronisław Makowski** (1927–31)
- (Poland) **Józef Mamoń** (1947–54)
- (Poland) **Patryk Małecki** (2001–14), (2016–19)
- (Poland) **Marian Markiewicz** (1918–26)
- (Poland) **Radosław Matusiak** (2008)
- (Poland) **Krzysztof Mączyński** (2007–11), (2015–17)
- (Poland) **Adam Michel** (1949–63)
- (Poland) Stanisław Mielech (1910–11)
- (Poland) **Michał Miśkiewicz** (2012–14), (2015–17)
- (Poland) **Fryderyk Monica** (1954–70)
- (Poland) **Zdzisław Mordarski** (1949–56)
- (Poland) **Kazimierz Moskal** (1982–90), (1999–2003)
- (Poland) **Olgierd Moskalewicz** (1999–2001)
- (Poland) **Marek Motyka** (1978–89)
- (Poland) **Adam Musiał** (1967–77)
- (Poland) **Adam Nawałka** (1972–85)
- (Poland) Janusz Nawrocki (1979–86)
- (Poland) Andrzej Niedzielan (2007–09)
- (Poland) **Grzegorz Pater** (1993–2003)
- (Poland) (Hungarian Republic (1946–49)) **Rudolf Patkoló** (1951–52)
- (Poland) **Mariusz Pawełek** (2006–10)
- (Poland) Sławomir Peszko (2019)
- (Poland) **Rafał Pietrzak** (2016–19)
- (Poland) **Zbigniew Płaszewski** (1975–81)
- (Poland) **Tadeusz Polak** (1958–73)
- (Poland) **Aleksander Pychowski** (1925–35)
- (Poland) **Henryk Reyman** (1910–33)
- (Poland) Maciej Sadlok (2014–22)
- (Poland) **Piotr Skrobowski** (1977–85)
- (Poland) **Emil Skrynkowicz** (1923–31)
- (Poland) **Radosław Sobolewski** (2005–13)
- (Poland) Łukasz Sosin (1999–2002)
- (Poland) Mariusz Stępiński (2014–15)
- (Poland) **Maciej Stolarczyk** (2002–07)
- (Poland) **Henryk Stroniarz** (1964–71)
- (Poland) **Zdzisław Styczeń** (1924–26)
- (Poland) Łukasz Surma (1995–98)
- (Poland) **Andrzej Sykta** (1959–68)
- (Poland) Igor Sypniewski (2002)
- (Poland) Maciej Szczęsny (2001–02)
- (Poland) **Mieczysław Szczurek** (1949–55)
- (Poland) **Antoni Szymanowski** (1969–70), (1972–78)
- (Poland) **Henryk Szymanowski** (1963–83)
- (Poland) **Mirosław Szymkowiak** (2001–04)
- (Poland) **Stefan Śliwa** (1912–24)
- (Poland) Marek Świerczewski (1981–89)
- (Poland) Marcin Wasilewski (2017–20)
- (Poland) **Kazimierz Węgrzyn** (1998–2000)
- (Poland) Jakub Wierzchowski (1998–99)
- (Poland) **Cezary Wilk** (2010–13)
- (Poland) **Mieczysław Wiśniewski** (1921–24)
- (Poland) Rafał Wolski (2016)
- (Poland) **Artur Woźniak** (1931–39)
- (Poland) **Michał Wróbel** (1975–86)
- (Poland) Mateusz Zachara (2016–17)
- (Poland) **Bogdan Zając** (1995–2002)
- (Poland) **Marek Zając** (1997–2002)
- (Poland) Łukasz Załuska (2016–17)
- (Poland) **Marek Zieńczuk** (2004–09)
- (Poland) Mieczysław Zimowski (1911–19)
- (Poland) **Maciej Żurawski** (1999–2005), (2010–11)
- (Poland) Michał Żyro (2022–24)

Albania

- (Albania) Vullnet Basha (2017–21), (2022–24)

Algeria

- (Algeria) Billel Omrani (2024)

Australia

- (Australia) **Jacob Burns** (2006–08)
- (Australia) **Michael Thwaite** (2006–08)

Belarus

- (Belarus) Anton Chichkan (2024–26)
- (Belarus) Andrey Hlebasolaw (1992)
- (Belarus) Mikhail Sivakov (2011)

Bosnia and Herzegovina

- (Bosnia and Herzegovina) **Semir Štilić** (2014–15), (2017)

Bulgaria

- (Bulgaria) **Tsvetan Genkov** (2011–13)

Cameroon

- (Cameroon) Serge Branco (2010–11)
- (Cameroon) Guy Armand Feutchine (1996–97)

Costa Rica

- (Costa Rica) **Felicio Brown Forbes** (2020–22)
- (Costa Rica) **Júnior Díaz** (2008–10), (2011–12)

Czech Republic

- (Czech Republic) Jan Kliment (2021–22)
- (Czech Republic) Zdeněk Ondrášek (2016–18), (2022–23)

Estonia

- (Estonia) **Sergei Pareiko** (2011–13)

Georgia

- (Georgia (country)) **Heorhiy Tsitaishvili** (2022)

Ghana

- (Ghana) **Yaw Yeboah** (2020–21)

Haiti

- (Haiti) **Wilde-Donald Guerrier** (2013–16)
- (Haiti) **Emmanuel Sarki** (2013–16)

Honduras

- (Honduras) **Osman Chávez** (2010–15)
- (Honduras) Romell Quioto (2012)

Hungary

- (Hungary) **Richárd Guzmics** (2014–16)
- (Hungary) Tamás Kiss (2024–25)

Israel

- (Israel) **Maor Melikson** (2011–13)
- (Israel) Alon Turgeman (2020)

Kazakhstan

- (Kazakhstan) **Georgy Zhukov** (2020–22)

Lithuania

- (Lithuania) Arūnas Pukelevičius (1998)

Luxembourg

- (Luxembourg) Tim Hall (2021)

Macedonia

- (North Macedonia) **Ostoja Stjepanović** (2013–15)
- (North Macedonia) **Enis Fazlagić** (2022–25)

Martinique

- (Martinique) Boris Moltenis (2022–23)

Moldova

- (Moldova) Ilie Cebanu (2007–09)

Montenegro

- (Montenegro) **Fatos Bećiraj** (2020)
- (Montenegro) **Vukan Savićević** (2019–20)

Morocco

- (Morocco) Nourdin Boukhari (2010–11)

Netherlands

- (Netherlands) Kew Jaliens (2011–13)

Nigeria

- (Nigeria) **Kalu Uche** (2001–05)

Romania

- (Romania) Emilian Dolha (2006–07)

Senegal

- (Senegal) Issa Ba (2010)

Serbia

- (Serbia) Ivica Iliev (2011–13)
- (Serbia) Milan Jovanić (2010–12)
- (Serbia) Nikola Mitrović (2018)
- (Serbia) Marko Poletanović (2022), (2025)

Slovakia

- (Slovakia) Erik Čikoš (2010–11)
- (Slovakia) Marek Penksa (2005–07)
- (Slovakia) Peter Šinglár (2008–10)
- (Slovakia) Michal Škvarka (2021–22)
- (Slovakia) Ivan Trabalík (2002)
- (Slovakia) Ľubomír Tupta (2020)

Slovenia

- (Slovenia) **Boban Jović** (2015–17)
- (Slovenia) **Andraž Kirm** (2009–12)
- (Slovenia) Matej Palčič (2018–19)
- (Slovenia) Denis Popović (2015–17)

Togo

- (Togo) Lantame Ouadja (2003–04)

Uruguay

- (Uruguay) Pablo Álvarez (2009–10)

== Managerial history ==
Caretaker managers listed in italics.

- (Hungary) Imre Schlosser (1924–29)
- (Czechoslovakia) František Koželuh (1929–34)
- (Hungary) Vilmos Nyúl (1934–39)
- (Czechoslovakia) Otto Mazal-Skvajn (1939–46)
- (Poland) Jan Kotlarczyk (1946–47)
- (Poland) Artur Walter (1947–48)
- (Czechoslovakia) Josef Kuchynka (1948–50)
- (Poland) Michał Matyas (1950–54)
- (Poland) Mieczysław Gracz (1954–55)
- (Poland) Artur Woźniak (1956–57)
- (Czechoslovakia) Josef Kuchynka (1958–59)
- (Hungary) Károly Kósa (1959–60)
- (Czechoslovakia) Karel Finek (1960–61)
- (Poland) Mieczysław Gracz (1961–62)
- (Czechoslovakia) Karel Kolsky (1963–64)
- (Poland) Czesław Skoraczyński (1964–67)
- (Poland) Mieczysław Gracz (1967–69)
- (Hungary) Gyula Teleky (1969–70)
- (Poland) Michał Matyas (1970–71)
- (Poland) Marian Kurdziel (1971–72)
- (Poland) Jerzy Steckiw (1972–74)
- (Poland) Henryk Stroniarz (1974–75)
- (Poland) Aleksander Brożyniak (1975–77)
- (Poland) Orest Lenczyk (1977–79)
- (Poland) Lucjan Franczak (1979–81)
- (Poland) Wiesław Lendzion (1981–82)
- (Poland) Roman Durniok (1982–83)
- (Poland) Edmund Zientara (1983–84)
- (Poland) Orest Lenczyk (1984–85)
- (Poland) Stanisław Chemicz (1985)
- (Poland) Lucjan Franczak (1985–86)
- (Poland) Stanisław Cygan (1986–87)
- (Poland) Aleksander Brożyniak (1987–89)
- (Poland) Stanisław Chemicz (1989)
- (Poland) Adam Musiał (1989)
- (Poland) Bogusław Hajdas (1989)
- (Poland) Adam Musiał (1990–92)
- (Poland) Kazimierz Kmiecik (1992)
- (Slovakia) Karol Pecze (1992–93)
- (Poland) Marek Kusto (1993–94)
- (Poland) Orest Lenczyk (1994)
- (Poland) Marek Kusto (1994)
- (Poland) Lucjan Franczak (1994–96)
- (Poland) Kazimierz Kmiecik (1996)
- (Poland) Henryk Apostel (1996–97)
- (Poland) Kazimierz Kmiecik (1997)
- (Poland) Wojciech Łazarek (1997–98)
- (Poland) Jerzy Kowalik (1998)
- (Poland) Franciszek Smuda (1998–99)
- (Poland) Jerzy Kowalik (1999)
- (Poland) Marek Kusto (1999–2000)
- (Poland) Wojciech Łazarek (2000)
- (Poland) Adam Nawałka (2000)
- (Poland) Orest Lenczyk (2000–01)
- (Poland) Adam Nawałka (2001)
- (Poland) Franciszek Smuda (2001–02)
- (Poland) Henryk Kasperczak (2002–04)
- (Czech Republic) Verner Lička (2004–05)
- (Poland) Jerzy Engel (2005)
- (Poland) Tomasz Kulawik (2005)
- (Romania) Dan Petrescu (2005–06)
- (Serbia) Dragan Okuka (2006)
- (Poland) Adam Nawałka (2007)
- (Poland) Kazimierz Moskal (2007)
- (Poland) Maciej Skorża (2007–10)
- (Poland) Henryk Kasperczak (2010)
- (Poland) Tomasz Kulawik (2010)
- (Netherlands) Robert Maaskant (2010–11)
- (Poland) Kazimierz Moskal (2011–12)
- (Poland) Michał Probierz (2012)
- (Poland) Tomasz Kulawik (2012–13)
- (Poland) Franciszek Smuda (2013–15)
- (Poland) Kazimierz Moskal (2015)
- (Poland) Marcin Broniszewski (2015–16)
- (Poland) Tadeusz Pawłowski (2015–16)
- (Poland) Marcin Broniszewski (2016)
- (Poland) Dariusz Wdowczyk (2016)
- (Poland) Kazimierz Kmiecik (2016)
- (Spain) Kiko Ramírez (2017)
- (Poland) Radosław Sobolewski (2017)
- (Spain) Joan Carrillo (2018)
- (Poland) Maciej Stolarczyk (2018–19)
- (Poland) Artur Skowronek (2019–20)
- (Germany) Peter Hyballa (2020–21)
- (Poland) Kazimierz Kmiecik (2021)
- (Slovakia) Adrián Guľa (2021–22)
- (Poland) Jerzy Brzęczek (2022)
- (Poland) Radosław Sobolewski (2022–23)
- (Poland) Mariusz Jop (2023)
- (Spain) Albert Rudé (2023–24)
- (Poland) Kazimierz Moskal (2024)
- (Poland) Mariusz Jop (2024–present)

== Other sections ==
=== Esports ===
Wisła Kraków also had an esports division, with teams in Counter-Strike: Global Offensive and FIFA 20.

=== Women's basketball ===
The women's basketball section are one of the most successful clubs in the country, winning 25 national championships, 12 vice-championships, 13 Polish Cups and continental runners-up in 1970.
