= 1955 Wisła Kraków season =

Wisła Kraków
1955 season
- Chairman: Tadeusz Kozłowski
- Manager: Mieczysław Gracz
- Ekstraklasa: 7th
- Polish Cup: Round of 16
- Top goalscorer: League: Wiesław Gamaj (9 goals); All: Wiesław Gamaj (10 goals)

The 1955 season was Wisła Kraków's 47th year as a club. Wisła was under the name of Gwardia Kraków until 10 September 1955.

== Friendlies ==
6 March 1955	Sparta Lubań (Poland)	3–0	(Poland) Gwardia Kraków	Lubań, Poland
		Report

1 May 1955	Gwardia Kraków (Poland)	1–3	(Poland) KS Cracovia	Kraków, Poland
	Waligóra	Report	Kasprzyk

26 May 1955	Gwardia Kraków (Poland)	1–0	(Poland) OWKS Kraków	Kraków, Poland
	Maniecki	Report		Attendance: 2,000; Referee: Zdzisław Kolber (Kraków)

17 July 1955	Gwardia Kraków (Poland)	1–5	(Czechoslovakia) Rudá Hvězda Brno	Kraków, Poland
	Gamaj	Report	Prohaska; Danda; Bubník; Salaj	Stadium: Stadion Gwardii; Attendance: 10,000; Referee: Julian Mytnik (Kraków)

22 July 1955	Gwardia Kraków (Poland)	5–1	(Poland) OWKS Kraków	Kraków, Poland
	Mordarski; Machowski; Adamczyk; Gamaj	Report	Pałubski

3 August 1955	Kraków (Poland)	2–3	(Poland) Gwardia Kraków	Kraków, Poland
	Bieniek; Kotaba	Report	Gamaj; K. Kościelny; Kotaba

14 August 1955	Gwardia Kraków (Poland)	4–2	(Poland) KS Nadwiślan	Kraków, Poland
	Adamczyk; K. Kościelny; Rogoza (pen.)	Report	Fąfara; Sarna

10 September 1955	KS Cracovia (Poland)	2–3	(Poland) Wisła Kraków	Kraków, Poland
	Wawrzusiak 15'; Pitala 88'	Report	Adamczyk 1'; Maniecki 50'; K. Kościelny 90'	Stadium: Stadion Cracovii; Attendance: 3,000; Referee: Urban (Kraków)

14 September 1955	Wisła Kraków (Poland)	3–0	(Poland) Gwardia Kielce	Kraków, Poland
	Machowski 14', ??'; K. Kościelny ??'	Report

20 September 1955	Wisła Kraków (Poland)	3–3	(Poland) Beskid Andrychów	Kraków, Poland
	K. Kościelny; Adamczyk; Budek	Report	Muskała; Gromotko; Gabor	Stadium: Stadion Wisły

October 1955	Tatran Prešov (Czechoslovakia)	2–2	(Poland) Wisła Kraków	Prešov, Czechoslovakia
	Eliášek	Report	Machowski

October 1955	Spartak VSS Košice (Czechoslovakia)	0–3	(Poland) Wisła Kraków	Košice, Czechoslovakia
		Report	Machowski; Kotaba

22 October 1955	Wisła Kraków (Poland)	4–5	(Czechoslovakia) Spartak VSS Košice	Kraków, Poland
	Machowski; Mordarski; Gamaj	Report	Kánássy; Gašparík; Vargovčík; Samuelčík	Stadium: Stadion Wisły; Attendance: 6,000; Referee: Stanisław Biernacik (Kraków)

30 October 1955	Wisła Kraków (Poland)	0–1	(Poland) Wisła Kraków Old Boye	Kraków, Poland
		Report	Jaskowski	Stadium: Stadion Wisły

9 November 1955	Wisła Kraków (Poland)	2–1	(Czechoslovakia) Tatran Prešov	Kraków, Poland
14:00 CET (UTC+1)	Morek; Rogoza	Report	Valášek	Stadium: Stadion Wisły; Attendance: 10,000; Referee: Czesław Popłatek (Kraków)

== Ekstraklasa ==
20 March 1955 1	Włókniarz Łódź	1–0	Gwardia Kraków	Łódź
12:00 CET (UTC+1)	Koźmiński 46'	Report		Stadium: Stadion ŁKS-u; Attendance: 12,000; Referee: Józef Szlejfer (Szczecin)

27 March 1955 2	Gwardia Kraków	0–3	CWKS Warsaw	Kraków
15:00 CET (UTC+1)		Report	Pohl 8'; Kowal 21', 71'	Stadium: Stadion Gwardii; Attendance: 12,000; Referee: Józef Kowal (Katowice)

3 April 1955 3	Stal Sosnowiec	1–0	Gwardia Kraków	Sosnowiec
	Krężel 73'	Report		Stadium: Stadion Stali; Attendance: 20,000; Referee: Stanisław Marciniak (Łódź)

17 April 1955 4	Gwardia Kraków	2–0	Gwardia Bydgoszcz	Kraków
11:00 CET (UTC+1)	Gamaj 51'; Kościelny 56'	Report	Szczepański (red card) 75'	Stadium: Stadion Gwardii; Attendance: 10,000; Referee: Stanisław Franczykowski (Bielsko-Biała)

24 April 1955 5	Garbarnia Kraków	0–1	Gwardia Kraków	Kraków
		Report	Gamaj 15'	Stadium: Stadion Garbarni; Attendance: 20,000; Referee: Włodzimierz Storoniak (Katowice)

8 May 1955 6	Gwardia Kraków	3–0	Polonia Bytom	Kraków
16:30 CET (UTC+1)	Budek 32'; Gamaj 75'; Mordarski 88'	Report		Stadium: Stadion Gwardii; Attendance: 12,000; Referee: Janusz Marcinkowski (Łódź)

15 May 1955 7	Gwardia Kraków	1–3	Lechia Gdańsk	Kraków
17:00 CET (UTC+1)	Kotaba 87'	Report	Kaleta 53'; Adamczyk 59'; Nowicki 85'	Stadium: Stadion Gwardii; Attendance: 12,000; Referee: Jerzy Barczyk (Katowice)

5 June 1955 8	Gwardia Kraków	6–2	Ruch Chorzów	Kraków
17:00 CET (UTC+1)	Gamaj 7', 16', 86'; Mordarski 25'; Budek 34'; Kotaba 88'	Report	Pohl 31'; Cieślik 40'	Stadium: Stadion Gwardii; Attendance: 20,000; Referee: Czesław Buśkiewicz (Warsaw)

9 June 1955 9	Górnik Radlin	1–2	Gwardia Kraków	Radlin
	Dybała 35'	Report	Gamaj 59'; Budek 69'	Stadium: Stadion Górnika; Attendance: 5,000; Referee: Kazimierz Bukowski (Radom)

12 June 1955 10	Gwardia Kraków	3–1	Kolejarz Poznań	Kraków
17:30 CET (UTC+1)	Gamaj 33'; Machowski 36', 40'; Mordarski (penalty missed) 50'	Report	Nowak 89'	Stadium: Stadion Gwardii; Attendance: 10,000; Referee: Zbigniew Matuszewski (Bydgoszcz)

19 June 1955 11	Gwardia Warsaw	3–0	Gwardia Kraków	Warsaw
	Hachorek 56'; Wiśniewski 62', 69'	Report		Stadium: Stadion Wojska Polskiego; Attendance: 6,000; Referee: Marian Nalepa (Zabrze)

17 August 1955 12	Gwardia Bydgoszcz	0–1	Gwardia Kraków	Bydgoszcz
		Report	Mordarski 3'	Stadium: Stadion Gwardii; Attendance: 3,000; Referee: Stefan Paszkowski (Warsaw)

21 August 1955 13	Gwardia Kraków	1–1	Włókniarz Łódź	Kraków
16:30 CET (UTC+1)	Machowski 77'	Report	Soporek 58'	Stadium: Stadion Gwardii; Attendance: 15,000; Referee: Włodzimierz Storoniak (Katowice)

28 August 1955 14	CWKS Warsaw	2–0	Gwardia Kraków	Warsaw
	Kempny 75', 81'	Report		Stadium: Stadion Wojska Polskiego; Attendance: 15,000; Referee: Stanisław Franczykowski (Bielsko-Biała)

4 September 1955 15	Gwardia Kraków	0–0	Stal Sosnowiec	Kraków
10:00 CET (UTC+1)		Report		Stadium: Stadion Gwardii; Attendance: 15,000; Referee: Grzegorz Aleksandrowicz (Warsaw)

24 September 1955 16	Wisła Kraków	0–3	Garbarnia Kraków	Kraków
15:45 CET (UTC+1)	Kotaba (penalty missed) 89'	Report	Piątek 4', 19'; Glajcar 70'	Stadium: Stadion Wisły; Attendance: 20,000; Referee: Józef Kowal (Katowice)

2 October 1955 17	Polonia Bytom	0–2	Wisła Kraków	Bytom
		Report	Mordarski 55'; Gamaj 66'	Stadium: Stadion Polonii; Attendance: 6,000; Referee: Franciszek Fronczyk (Tarnów)

9 October 1955 18	Lechia Gdańsk	2–1	Wisła Kraków	Gdańsk
15:00 CET (UTC+1)	Adamczyk 20'; Jarczyk 45'	Report	Kotaba 88'	Stadium: Stadion Lechii; Attendance: 18,000; Referee: Zdzisław Hasselbusch (Warsaw)

16 October 1955 19	Wisła Kraków	1–0	Gwardia Warsaw	Kraków
	Machowski 26'	Report		Stadium: Stadion Wisły; Attendance: 15,000; Referee: Józef Szlejfer (Szczecin)

6 November 1955 20	Wisła Kraków	1–0	Górnik Radlin	Kraków
13:30 CET (UTC+1)	Machowski 57'	Report	Budziński (red card) ??'	Stadium: Stadion Wisły; Attendance: 10,000; Referee: Jan Gronowski (Warsaw)

13 November 1955 21	Kolejarz Poznań	3–1	Wisła Kraków	Poznań
12:00 CET (UTC+1)	Wróbel 10'; Anioła 25'; Gogolewski 44'	Report	Mordarski 66'	Stadium: Stadion na Dębcu; Attendance: 10,000; Referee: Antoni Marszoł (Chorzów)

27 November 1955 22	Ruch Chorzów	3–0	Wisła Kraków	Chorzów
	Wiśniewski 58', 70'; J. Pohl 75'	Report		Stadium: Stadion Ruchu; Attendance: 6,000; Referee: Zbigniew Matuszewski (Bydgoszcz)

== Polish Cup ==
13 March 1955 Round of 32	Gwardia Kraków	2–0	Górnik Zabrze	Kraków
13:00 CET (UTC+1)	Mordarski; Gamaj	Report		Stadium: Stadion Gwardii; Attendance: 3,000; Referee: Aleksander Cyprys (Opole)

28 April 1955 Round of 16	Gwardia Kraków	0–1	Lechia Gdańsk	Kraków
16:30 CET (UTC+1)		Report	Kobylański 4'	Stadium: Stadion Gwardii; Attendance: 12,000; Referee: Stanisław Franczykowski (Bielsko-Biała)

== Squad, appearances and goals ==
No.	Pos	Nat	Player	Total		Ekstraklasa		Polish Cup	
No.	Pos	Nat	Player	Apps	Goals	Apps	Goals	Apps	Goals
	GK	(Poland) POL	Jerzy Jurowicz	19	0	19+0	0	0+0	0
	GK	(Poland) POL	Stanisław Kalisz	6	0	3+1	0	2+0	0
	GK	(Poland) POL	Stefan Swoboda	1	0	0+1	0	0+0	0
	DF	(Poland) POL	Ryszard Budka	16	0	15+0	0	1+0	0
	DF	(Poland) POL	Mieczysław Dudek	15	0	14+1	0	0+0	0
	DF	(Poland) POL	Jerzy Piotrowski	19	0	17+0	0	2+0	0
	DF	(Poland) POL	Edward Szymeczko	5	0	4+0	0	1+0	0
	MF	(Poland) POL	Kazimierz Budek	16	3	14+1	3	1+0	0
	MF	(Poland) POL	Ryszard Jędrys	16	0	14+0	0	2+0	0
	MF	(Poland) POL	Włodzimierz Kościelny	10	1	7+2	1	1+0	0
	MF	(Poland) POL	Zbigniew Kotaba	24	3	19+3	3	2+0	0
	MF	(Poland) POL	Marian Machowski	16	5	15+1	5	0+0	0
	MF	(Poland) POL	Adam Michel	10	0	9+1	0	0+0	0
	MF	(Poland) POL	Leszek Snopkowski	22	0	21+0	0	1+0	0
	MF	(Poland) POL	Mieczysław Szczurek	8	0	6+0	0	2+0	0
	MF	(Poland) POL	Jan Wapiennik	12	0	11+0	0	1+0	0
	FW	(Poland) POL	Stanisław Adamczyk	10	0	7+1	0	1+1	0
	FW	(Poland) POL	Wiesław Gamaj	22	10	21+0	9	1+0	1
	FW	(Poland) POL	Zbigniew Jaskowski	4	0	3+0	0	1+0	0
	FW	(Poland) POL	Zdzisław Mordarski	23	6	21+0	5	2+0	1
	FW	(Poland) POL	Antoni Rogoza	9	0	2+5	0	1+1	0
	FW	(Poland) POL	Jan Waligóra	1	0	0+1	0	0+0	0

=== Goalscorers ===
Place	Position	Nation	Name	Ekstraklasa	Polish Cup	Total
1	FW	(Poland)	Wiesław Gamaj	9	1	10
2	FW	(Poland)	Zdzisław Mordarski	5	1	6
3	MF	(Poland)	Marian Machowski	5	0	5
4	MF	(Poland)	Zbigniew Kotaba	3	0	3
4	MF	(Poland)	Kazimierz Budek	3	0	3
6	MF	(Poland)	Włodzimierz Kościelny	1	0	1
			Totals	26	2	28
