= 1956 Wisła Kraków season =

Wisła Kraków
1956 season
- Chairman: Tadeusz Kozłowski
- Manager: Artur Woźniak
- Ekstraklasa: 5th
- Polish Cup: Semifinal
- Top goalscorer: League: Marian Machowski (11 goals); All: Marian Machowski (13 goals)

The 1956 season was Wisła Kraków's 48th year as a club.

== Friendlies ==
8 March 1956	Wisła Kraków (Poland)	0–1	(Poland) OWKS Kraków	Kraków, Poland
		Report	Piechaczek	Stadium: Stadion Wisły; Attendance: 1,000

1 April 1956	Wisła Kraków (Poland)	1–4	(Czechoslovakia) Baník Kladno	Kraków, Poland
	Gamaj	Report	Majer; Sršeň; Hovorka; Bragagnola	Stadium: Stadion Wisły; Attendance: 1,000; Referee: Tadeusz Kula (Chrzanów)

13 May 1956	Karlovy Vary (Czechoslovakia)	1–2	(Poland) Wisła Kraków	Karlovy Vary, Czechoslovakia
	Navotny	Report	M. Machowski; Morek

14 May 1956	Brno (Czechoslovakia)	2–0	(Poland) Wisła Kraków	Brno, Czechoslovakia
	Salaj	Report

10 June 1956	Wisła Kraków (Poland)	2–4	(Brazil) Atlética Portuguesa	Kraków, Poland
	Jędrys; K. Kościelny	Report	Perutho; Guilheume	Stadium: Stadion Wisły; Attendance: 40,000; Referee: Julian Mytnik (Kraków)

24 June 1956	Wisła Kraków (Poland)	2–2	(Poland) KS Cracovia	Kraków, Poland
	K. Kościelny; Rogoza	Report	Kasprzyk	Stadium: Stadion Wisły; Attendance: 10,000; Referee: Kazimierz Bukowski (Radom)

1 July 1956	Wisła Kraków (Poland)	1–2	FK Austria Wien	Kraków, Poland
	Morek	Report	Malik	Stadium: Stadion Wisły; Attendance: 12,000; Referee: Julian Mytnik (Kraków)

5 July 1956	Žilina (Czechoslovakia)	3–1	(Poland) Wisła Kraków	Považská Bystrica, Czechoslovakia
		Report

7 July 1956	Žilina (Czechoslovakia)	2–2	(Poland) Wisła Kraków	Ružomberok, Czechoslovakia
		Report

30 July 1956	Wisła Kraków (Poland)	2–0	(Czechoslovakia) Dynamo Žilina	Kraków, Poland
	Morek; M. Machowski	Report		Stadium: Stadion Wisły; Attendance: 10,000

25 August 1956	Sparta Gliwice (Poland)	0–10	(Poland) Wisła Kraków	Gliwice, Poland
		Report

26 August 1956	Piast Gliwice (Poland)	3–4	(Poland) Wisła Kraków	Gliwice, Poland
		Report

26 September 1956	Tarnów (Poland)	5–1	(Poland) Wisła Kraków	Tarnów, Poland
	Gęborz; Oprych; Witek; Nowak; Białaś	Report	Maniecki

30 September 1956	Wisła Kraków (Poland)	2–5	(Soviet Union) Dynamo Moscow	Kraków, Poland
	Gamaj	Report	Ryzhkin; Ilyin; Fedosov; Mamykin ?	Stadium: Stadion Wisły; Attendance: 35,000; Referee: Józef Kowal (Katowice)

4 October 1956	Wisła Kraków (Poland)	1–0	(Hungary) Csepel SC	Kraków, Poland
	Gamaj 78'	Report		Stadium: Stadion Wisły; Attendance: 25,000; Referee: Stanisław Biernacik (Kraków)

7 October 1956	Wisła Kraków (Poland)	1–0	(Brazil) América Mineiro	Kraków, Poland
	M. Machowski 90' (pen.)	Report		Stadium: Stadion Wisły

== Ekstraklasa ==
18 March 1956 1	Wisła Kraków	2–0	Gwardia Bydgoszcz	Kraków
11:30 CET (UTC+1)	Gamaj 71'; M. Machowski 77' (pen.)	Report		Stadium: Stadion Wisły; Attendance: 12,000; Referee: Franciszek Hołyst (Warsaw)

25 March 1956 2	Ruch Chorzów	1–1	Wisła Kraków	Chorzów
15:30 CET (UTC+1)	Alszer 21'	Report	Adamczyk 88'	Stadium: Stadion Ruchu; Attendance: 15,000; Referee: Zbigniew Matuszewski (Bydgoszcz)

8 April 1956 3	Wisła Kraków	2–0	Legia Warsaw	Kraków
	Gamaj 10', 75'	Report		Stadium: Stadion Wisły; Attendance: 20,000; Referee: Marian Handtke (Poznań)

15 April 1956 4	Garbarnia Kraków	1–1	Wisła Kraków	Kraków
16:00 CET (UTC+1)	Piątek 5'	Report	M. Machowski 55' (pen.)	Stadium: Stadion Garbarnii; Attendance: 20,000; Referee: Jan Gronowski (Warsaw)

22 April 1956 5	Wisła Kraków	2–0	ŁKS Łódź	Kraków
16:00 CET (UTC+1)	Jędrys 14'; Morek 21'	Report		Stadium: Stadion Wisły; Attendance: 24,000; Referee: Józef Kowal (Katowice)

29 April 1956 6	Zagłębie Sosnowiec	1–2	Wisła Kraków	Sosnowiec
16:30 CET (UTC+1)	Ciszek 47'	Report	Morek 1', 66'	Stadium: Stadion Zagłębia; Attendance: 20,000; Referee: Antoni Gorączniak (Poznań)

6 May 1956 7	Wisła Kraków	7–1	Górnik Zabrze	Kraków
	M. Machowski 6', 48' (pen.); Adamczyk 46', 53', 69'; Morek 75', 83'	Report	Jankowski 22'	Stadium: Stadion Wisły; Attendance: 20,000; Referee: Marian Koczner (Gdańsk)

20 May 1956 8	Lech Poznań	1–1	Wisła Kraków	Poznań
11:00 CET (UTC+1)	Anioła 10'	Report	M. Machowski 85' (pen.)	Stadium: Stadion na Dębcu; Attendance: 10,000; Referee: Stefan Paszkowski (Warsaw)

27 May 1956 9	Odra Opole	1–0	Wisła Kraków	Opole
	Spałek 75'	Report		Stadium: Stadion Odry; Attendance: 7,000; Referee: Jerzy Hasselbusch (Warsaw)

3 June 1956 10	Wisła Kraków	0–1	Lechia Gdańsk	Kraków
16:30 CET (UTC+1)		Report	Rogocz 75'	Stadium: Stadion Wisły; Attendance: 20,000; Referee: Stefan Kulczyk (Sosnowiec)

17 June 1956 11	Gwardia Warsaw	0–0	Wisła Kraków	Warsaw
17:30 CET (UTC+1)		Report		Stadium: Stadion Gwardii; Attendance: 10,000; Referee: Józef Szlejfer (Szczecin)

5 August 1956 12	Gwardia Bydgoszcz	2–0	Wisła Kraków	Bydgoszcz
	Brzeski 5'; Norkowski 56'	Report		Stadium: Stadion Polonii; Attendance: 8,000; Referee: Stanisław Franczykowski (Bielsko-Biała)

12 August 1956 13	Wisła Kraków	1–2	Ruch Chorzów	Kraków
17:00 CET (UTC+1)	M. Machowski 76'	Report	Droździok 59'; Cieślik 75'	Stadium: Stadion Wisły; Attendance: 15,000; Referee: Jan Gronowski (Warsaw)

19 August 1956 14	Legia Warsaw	12–0	Wisła Kraków	Warsaw
16:30 CET (UTC+1)	Kowal 7', 52'; Pohl 28', 30', 32', 53', 59'; Brychczy 44', 48', 77'; Monica 72' (o.g.); Kempny 79' (pen.)	Report		Stadium: Stadion Wojska Polskiego; Attendance: 20,000; Referee: Józef Kowal (Katowice)

2 September 1956 15	Wisła Kraków	8–3	Garbarnia Kraków	Kraków
	Gamaj 5', 11', 89'; Rogoza 46', 90'; M. Machowski 48', 70'; Adamczyk 60'	Report	Konopelski 20'; Browarski 65'; Bożek 82'	Stadium: Stadion Wisły; Attendance: 22,000; Referee: Józef Kowal (Katowice)

9 September 1956 16	ŁKS Łódź	0–2	Wisła Kraków	Łódź
		Report	M. Machowski 73'; Rogoza 75'	Stadium: Stadion ŁKS-u; Attendance: 35,000; Referee: Józef Szlejfer (Szczecin)

16 September 1956 17	Wisła Kraków	6–0	Zagłębie Sosnowiec	Kraków
11:00 CET (UTC+1)	Gamaj 33'; Rogoza 42', 46'; Adamczyk 48'; M. Machowski 57'; K. Kościelny 75'	Report	Głowacki (red card) ??'; Krajewski (red card) ??'	Stadium: Stadion Wisły; Attendance: 25,000; Referee: Edward Sperling (Łódź)

23 September 1956 18	Górnik Zabrze	2–0	Wisła Kraków	Zabrze
	Wiśniowski 24' (pen.); Lentner 85'	Report		Stadium: Stadion Górnika; Attendance: 20,000; Referee: Franciszek Hołyst (Warsaw)

14 October 1956 19	Wisła Kraków	1–3	Lech Poznań	Kraków
	Rogoza 77'	Report	Anioła 8', 47'; Słoma 76' (pen.)	Stadium: Stadion Wisły; Attendance: 12,000; Referee: Włodzimierz Storoniak (Katowice)

21 October 1956 20	Wisła Kraków	0–0	Odra Opole	Kraków
		Report		Stadium: Stadion Wisły; Attendance: 10,000; Referee: Marian Handtke (Poznań)

11 November 1956 21	Lechia Gdańsk	2–0	Wisła Kraków	Gdańsk
12:00 CET (UTC+1)	Gronowski 18'; Musiał 26'	Report		Stadium: Stadion Lechii; Attendance: 7,000; Referee: Edmund Sperling (Łódź)

25 November 1956 22	Wisła Kraków	2–1	Gwardia Warsaw	Kraków
12:00 CET (UTC+1)	M. Machowski 2'; Gamaj 18'	Report	Hachorek 33'	Stadium: Stadion Wisły; Attendance: 5,000; Referee: Marian Handtke (Poznań)

== Polish Cup ==
20 November 1955 Round of 32	Wisła Kraków	3–1	KS Cracovia	Kraków
	Adamczyk 12', 17', 56'	Report	Kolasa 87' (pen.)	Stadium: Stadion Wisły; Attendance: 8,000; Referee: Zdzisław Hasselbusch (Warsaw)

11 March 1956 Round of 16	Wisła Kraków	3–1	Kolejarz Kluczbork	Kraków
11:00 CET (UTC+1)	Adamczyk 12', 46', 81'	Report	Turowski 41'	Stadium: Stadion Wisły; Attendance: 3,000; Referee: Aleksander Zubcow (Warsaw)

24 May 1956 Quarterfinal	Wisła Kraków	4–2 (a.e.t.)	Polonia Bytom	Kraków
17:00 CET (UTC+1)	Budek 78'; K. Kościelny 92'; Jędrys 102'; Machowski 118'	Report	Sąsiadek 33'; Krasucki 93'	Stadium: Stadion Wisły; Attendance: 15,000; Referee: Janusz Marcinkowski (Łódź)

13 June 1956 Semifinal	Wisła Kraków	2–3 (a.e.t.)	Górnik Zabrze	Kraków
17:00 CET (UTC+1)	K. Kościelny 2'; Machowski 32'; Michel (red card) 108'	Report	Jankowski 5', 60', 138'	Stadium: Stadion Wisły; Attendance: 15,000; Referee: Adam Michalewski (Lublin)

== Squad, appearances and goals ==
No.	Pos	Nat	Player	Total		Ekstraklasa		Polish Cup	
No.	Pos	Nat	Player	Apps	Goals	Apps	Goals	Apps	Goals
	GK	(Poland) POL	Jerzy Jurowicz	1	0	0+0	0	1+0	0
	GK	(Poland) POL	Stanisław Kalisz	14	0	13+0	0	1+0	0
	GK	(Poland) POL	Władysław Machowski	11	0	9+0	0	2+0	0
	DF	(Poland) POL	Ryszard Budka	22	0	20+0	0	2+0	0
	DF	(Poland) POL	Mieczysław Dudek	4	0	2+0	0	2+0	0
	DF	(Poland) POL	Władysław Kawula	12	0	12+0	0	0+0	0
	DF	(Poland) POL	Fryderyk Monica	6	0	4+0	0	2+0	0
	DF	(Poland) POL	Zbigniew Ogiela	1	0	0+0	0	1+0	0
	DF	(Poland) POL	Jerzy Piotrowski	15	0	12+0	0	3+0	0
	DF	(Poland) POL	Edward Szymeczko	1	0	1+0	0	0+0	0
	MF	(Poland) POL	Kazimierz Budek	12	1	9+0	0	2+1	1
	MF	(Poland) POL	Ryszard Jędrys	24	2	21+0	1	3+0	1
	MF	(Poland) POL	Kazimierz Kościelny	17	3	15+0	1	2+0	2
	MF	(Poland) POL	Włodzimierz Kościelny	3	0	1+0	0	1+1	0
	MF	(Poland) POL	Zbigniew Kotaba	4	0	3+0	0	1+0	0
	MF	(Poland) POL	Marian Machowski	26	13	22+0	11	4+0	2
	MF	(Poland) POL	Józef Maniecki	2	0	1+0	0	1+0	0
	MF	(Poland) POL	Adam Michel	24	0	21+0	0	3+0	0
	MF	(Poland) POL	Marian Morek	17	5	15+0	5	2+0	0
	MF	(Poland) POL	Leszek Snopkowski	22	0	18+0	0	4+0	0
	FW	(Poland) POL	Stanisław Adamczyk	21	12	18+0	6	3+0	6
	FW	(Poland) POL	Wiesław Gamaj	20	8	17+0	8	3+0	0
	FW	(Poland) POL	Antoni Rogoza	10	6	8+0	6	1+1	0

=== Goalscorers ===
Place	Position	Nation	Name	Ekstraklasa	Polish Cup	Total
1	MF	(Poland)	Marian Machowski	11	2	13
2	FW	(Poland)	Stanisław Adamczyk	6	6	12
3	FW	(Poland)	Wiesław Gamaj	8	0	8
4	FW	(Poland)	Antoni Rogoza	6	0	6
5	MF	(Poland)	Marian Morek	5	0	5
6	MF	(Poland)	Kazimierz Kościelny	1	2	3
7	MF	(Poland)	Ryszard Jędrys	1	1	2
8	MF	(Poland)	Kazimierz Budek	0	1	1
			TOTALS	38	12	50

=== Disciplinary record ===
Name	Nation	Position	Ekstraklasa	Polish Cup	Total
Name	Nation	Position	Sent off (straight red)	Sent off (straight red)	
Adam Michel	(Poland)	MF	0	1	1
