= Prądnik =

Prądnik may refer to:

== Cuisine ==
- Prądnik bread

== Rivers ==
- Prądnik (river), Lesser Poland Voivodeship, Poland

== Places ==
=== Villages ===
- Prądnik, West Pomeranian Voivodeship, a village in Poland
- Prądnik Korzkiewski, a village in the Lesser Poland Voivodeship, Poland

=== Boroughs of Kraków ===
- Prądnik Biały, the III borough of Kraków and an eponymous neighbourhood
- Prądnik Czerwony, the IV borough of Kraków and an eponymous neighbourhood

== See also ==
- Prądniczanka, a Kraków-based sports club
