= Prądnik (river) =

Prądnik Białucha
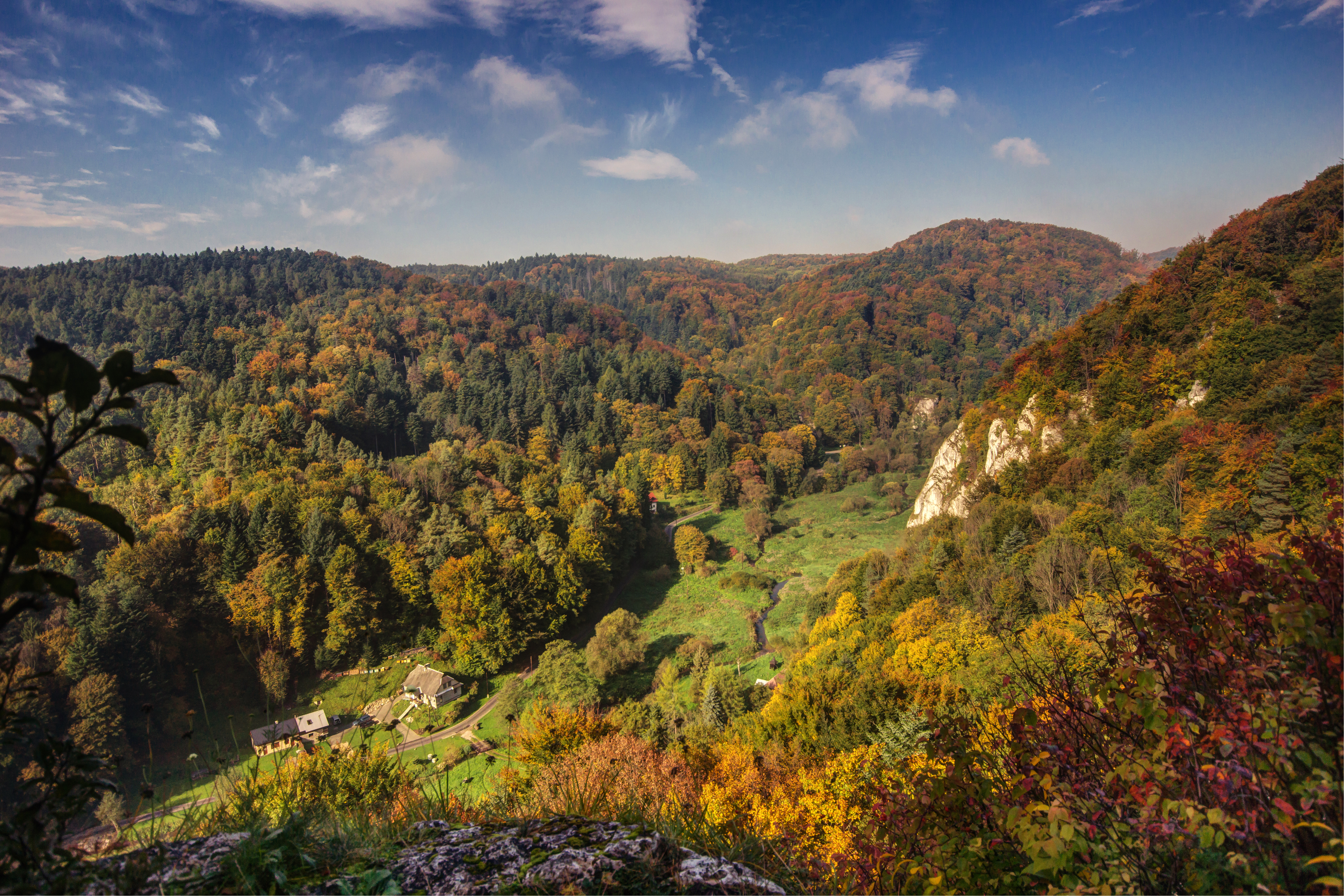
- Valley of Prądnik as seen from Okopy hill.

Physical characteristics
- Source
  - location: Sułoszowa
- Mouth
  - location: Vistula
  - coordinates: 50°03′37″N 19°59′11″E
- Length: 33.4 km (20.8 mi)
- Discharge
  - average: 1.32 m^{3}/s (47 cu ft/s)

Basin features
- Progression: Vistula→ Baltic Sea

The Prądnik (also called Białucha in its lower course) is a river in Poland, running through the Kraków-Częstochowa Upland in Poland's Lesser Poland voivodeship. The river is a left tributary of the Vistula. The source of the river lies in the village of Sułoszowa in the Olkusz Uplands. It flows in a deep gully through the Ojców National Park. The lower run in Kraków was designated an ecological reserve in December 2008. Until 1655, when the Vistula changed its course in the vicinity of Kraków, the Prądnik joined the Vistula's old riverbed near what is now Blich Street. However, in modern times the lower run of the river is regulated and empties into the Vistula in Kraków's borough of Dąbie.

Apart from the official names, the river is variously known as Prątnik, Promnik, Sałaszówka, or Sułoszówka.

Prądnik passes through several towns and villages, giving names to some of them. The list includes Sułoszowa, Pieskowa Skała, Ojców, Prądnik Korzkiewski, Giebułtów, Januszowice, Pękowice, and Zielonki, as well as Kraków's boroughs of Prądnik Biały, Prądnik Czerwony, Stare Miasto, and Grzegórzki. The stream Sąspówka is a right tributary.

== See also ==
- Prądnik bread
