= Zesławicki Lagoon =

Lagoon in Poland

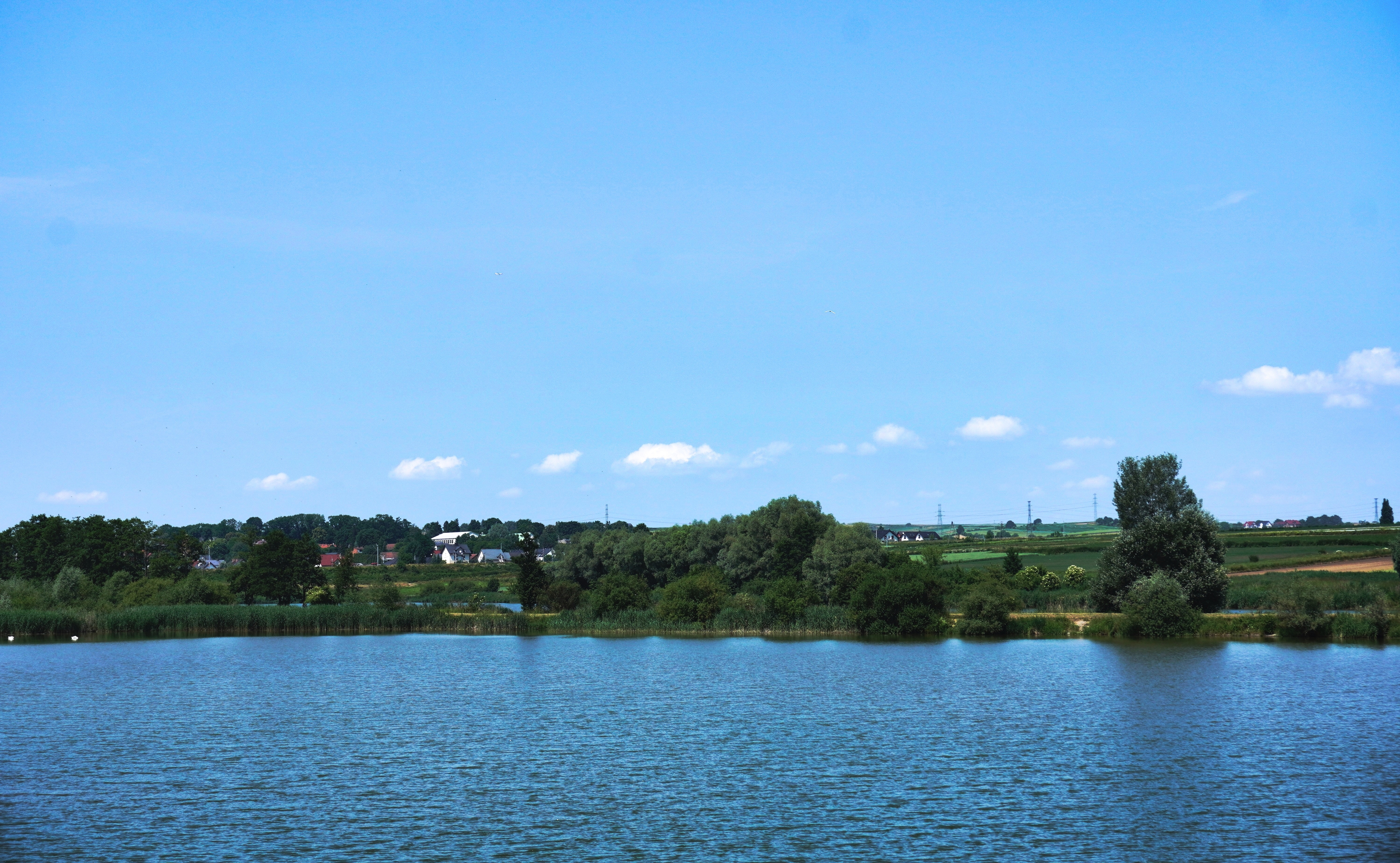

- Location within Lesser Poland Voivodeship
- Location: Kraków
- Coordinates: 50°06′28″N 20°01′57″E
- Surface area: 0.09 square kilometres (0.035 sq mi)

Zesławicki Lagoon (Polish: Zalew Zesławicki) is an artificial body of water consisting of two reservoirs separated by a concrete causeway. Located near Kraków's Mistrzejowice district, as well as the villages of Raciborowice (gmina Michałowice) and Batowice (gmina Zielonki), it is used as the water intake for some osiedla of Nowa Huta. The name of the lagoon is derived from Zesławice, a former village attached to Nowa Huta and later incorporated into Kraków, where the dams and reservoirs were built.

The lagoon lies approximately 215 metres above sea level. It is bordered by Gustawa Morcinka Street to the south, Ku Raciborowicom Street to the east, the No. 8 railway track to the north, and the site of a once planned third reservoir to the west. The River Dłubina feeds the lagoon, with a dam at the inlet controlling the water levels in the reservoirs.

The lagoon was built in the 1950s. By the mid-1980s, it had largely ceased to serve its original function due to the development of Lake Dobczyce.

== Recreation ==
Around the lagoon, there is a peaceful circular trail approximately 2.6 kilometres (1.6 mi) long, perfect for running and walking.

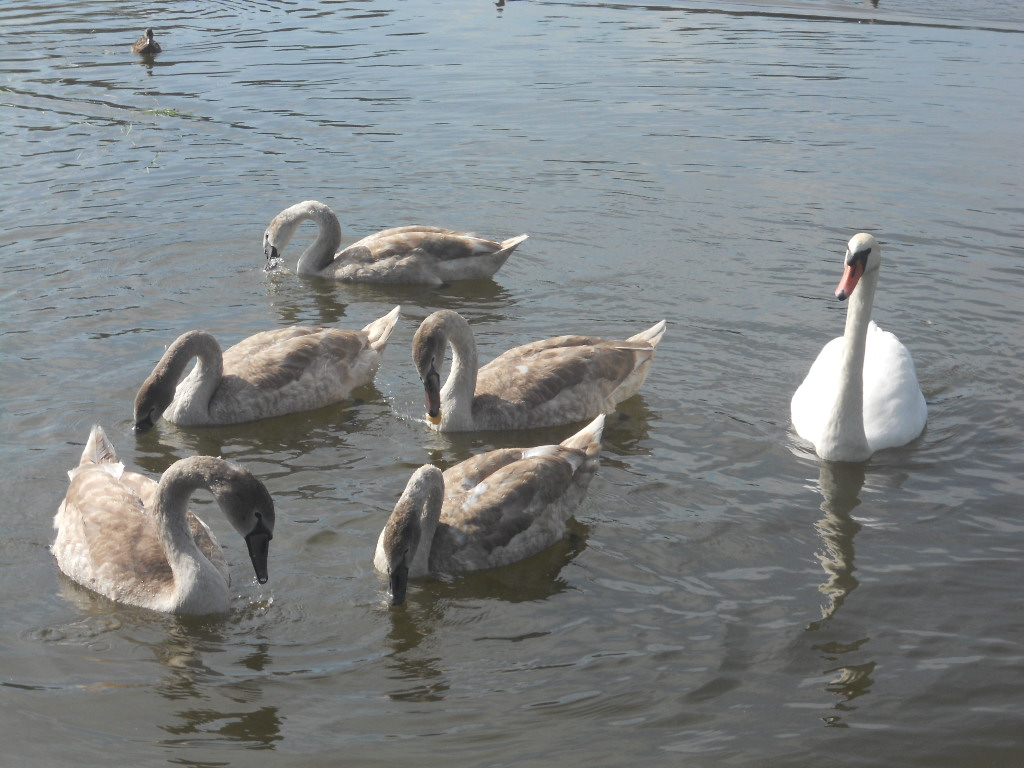
Swans in the lagoon

The once-planned third reservoir is now overgrown with vegetation, creating a habitat that supports diverse array of birds species. In addition to swans and ducks, visitors can observe spotted crakes, garganeys, spotted redshanks, cuckoos, and water rails. While birdwatching is enjoyable year-round (except in winter), spring is considered the best time to visit.

== Transport ==
A free car park with space for a dozen cars is located on Gustawa Morcinka Street, right by the lagoon. For public transport, you can take bus 159 or 193 to the Kruszwicka stop, followed by a twenty-minute walk to the lagoon.
