= Garlica =

Garlica may refer to the following places in Poland:

- Garlica Duchowna
- Garlica Murowana
