= Július =

Július is a Slovak masculine given name, a variant of the name Julius. Notable people with the name include:

- Július Balász (1901–1970), Slovak swimmer
- Július Bielik (born 1962), Slovak footballer
- Július Binder (1931–2021), Slovak engineer and manager
- Július Brocka (born 1957), Slovak politician
- Július Ďuriš (1904–1986), Slovak politician
- Július Gombala (born 1993), Slovak footballer
- Július Holeš (1939–2021), Slovak footballer
- Július Hudáček (born 1988), Slovak ice hockey goaltender
- Július Ivan (born 1954), Slovak track and field hurdler
- Július Iždinský (born 1971), Slovak water polo player
- Július Jakoby (1903–1985), Slovak painter
- Július Kánássy (born 1934), Slovak football player and coach
- Július Korostelev (1923–2006), Slovak football player and coach
- Július Kozma (1929–2009), Slovak chess player
- Július Nôta (1971–2009), Slovak footballer
- Július Pántik (1922–2002), Slovak actor
- Július Satinský (1941–2002), Slovak actor
- Július Schubert (1922–1949), Slovak-Hungarian footballer
- Július Šimon (born 1965), Slovak footballer
- Július Strnisko (1958–2008), Slovak freestyle wrestler
- Július Šupler (born 1950), Slovak ice hockey coach
- Július Szöke (born 1995), Slovak footballer
- Július Toček (1939–2004), Slovak rower
- Július Tomin (Interlingua) (1915–2003), Slovak high school teacher and author
- Július Torma (1922–1991), Slovak boxer

== See also ==
- Júliusi éjszaka, 1929 Hungarian play
