= Dziekanowice =

Dziekanowice may refer to the following places:

- Dziekanowice, Kraków County in Lesser Poland Voivodeship (south Poland)
- Dziekanowice, part of the Mistrzejowice district of Kraków
- Dziekanowice, Myślenice County in Lesser Poland Voivodeship (south Poland)
- Dziekanowice, Świętokrzyskie Voivodeship (south-central Poland)
- Dziekanowice, Greater Poland Voivodeship (west-central Poland)
