= Bieneck =

Bieneck is a surname. Notable people with the surname include:

- Hellmuth Bieneck (1887–1972), German general of aviation
- Elisabeth Bieneck-Roos (1925–2017), German painter
- Victoria Bieneck, German volleyball player

== See also ==
- Bienek
- Bieniek
