= Fryderyk Monica =

Polish footballer

Personal information
- Date of birth: 19 October 1937
- Place of birth: Kraków, Poland
- Date of death: 17 February 1983 (aged 45)
- Place of death: Kraków, Poland
- Height: 1.77 m (5 ft 10 in)
- Position: Defender

Senior career*
Years	Team	Apps	(Gls)
–1954	Prądniczanka Kraków		
1954–1970	Wisła Kraków		

International career
1959–1963	Poland	13	(0)
- * Club domestic league appearances and goals

Fryderyk Monica (19 October 1937 – 17 February 1983) was a Polish footballer who played as a defender.

He played in thirteen matches for the Poland national team from 1959 to 1963.

== Honours ==
Wisła Kraków

- Polish Cup: 1966–67
- II liga: 1964–65
