= Władysław Kawula =

Polish footballer (1937–2008)

Personal information
- Full name: Władysław Kazimierz Kawula
- Date of birth: 27 September 1937
- Place of birth: Kraków, Austria-Hungary
- Date of death: 1 February 2008 (aged 70)
- Place of death: Kraków, Poland
- Height: 1.84 m (6 ft 0 in)
- Position: Defender

Senior career*
Years	Team	Apps	(Gls)
–1950	Prądniczanka Kraków		
1951–1971	Wisła Kraków	329+	(26+)
1971–1973	White Eagles Chicago		
1973–1974	Victoria Jaworzno		
1974–1977	Kalwarianka Kalwaria		

International career
1960–1962	Poland	5	(0)

Managerial career
- Kalwarianka Kalwaria (player-manager)
- * Club domestic league appearances and goals

Władysław Kazimierz Kawula (27 September 1937 – 1 February 2008) was a Polish footballer who played as a defender. Kawula played for Prądniczanka Kraków, Wisła Kraków, White Eagles Chicago, Victoria Jaworzno and Kalwarianka Kalwaria Zebrzydowska over the course of his career. He died on 1 February 2008 at 4:12 PM (15:12 GMT), aged 70. The Prądniczanka stadium is named in his honour.

== Career ==
Kawula joined Wisła Kraków in 1951, at the age of 20 years and went on to score 26 goals in 329 top division appearances, which is still a club record to date.

During his time as a Wisła player, Kawula was part of the 1967 Polish Cup winning team. He also captained the team on many occasions.

Kawula left Wisła to join White Eagles Chicago in 1971. He returned to Poland two years later and played in the lower leagues for Victoria Jaworzno and Kalwarianka Kalwaria Zebrzydowska.

On 28 September 1960, Kawula played his first game for Poland in a game against France. He went on to make another four appearances for his country.

== Honours ==
Wisła Kraków

- II liga: 1964–65
- Polish Cup: 1966–67
