= Osiedle Łokietka =

- Village
- Location within Poland
- Coordinates: 49°51′32″N 20°32′01″E
- Country: Poland
- Voivodeship: Lesser Poland
- County: Kraków
- Gmina: Zielonki
- Population: 657

Osiedle Łokietka [ɔˈɕɛdlɛ wɔˈkʲɛtka] is a village in the administrative district of Gmina Zielonki, within Kraków County, Lesser Poland Voivodeship, in southern Poland.
