= Bibice =

- Village
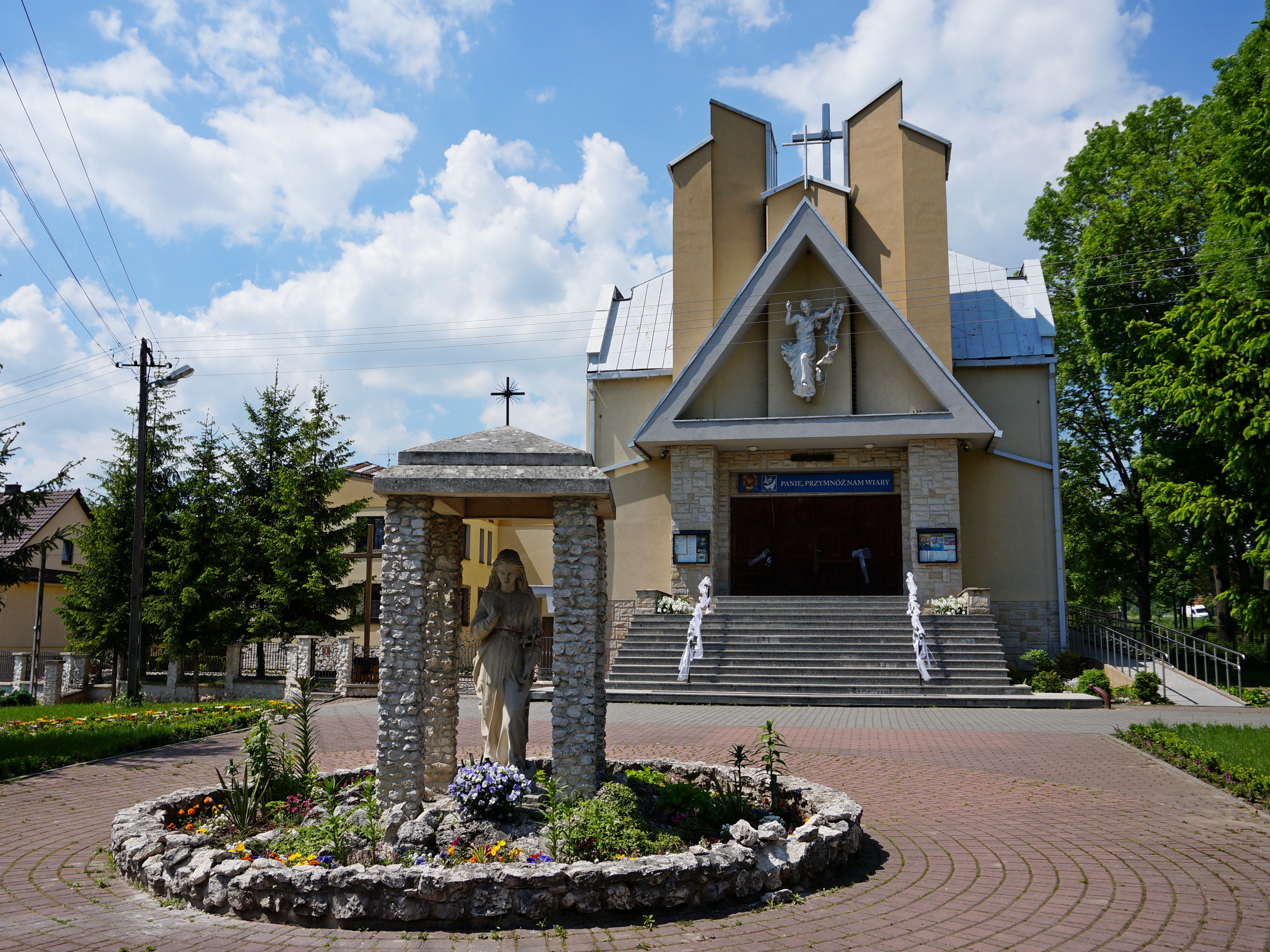
- Church of Our Lady of Perpetual Help

- Location within Poland
- Coordinates: 50°7′48″N 19°57′9″E
- Country: Poland
- Voivodeship: Lesser Poland
- County: Kraków
- Gmina: Zielonki

Population
  - Total: ~4,800
- Website: http://www.bibice.z.pl

Bibice [biˈbit͡sɛ] is a village in the administrative district of Gmina Zielonki, within Kraków County, Lesser Poland Voivodeship, in southern Poland.
