= Przybysławice, Gmina Zielonki =

Przybysławice
- Village
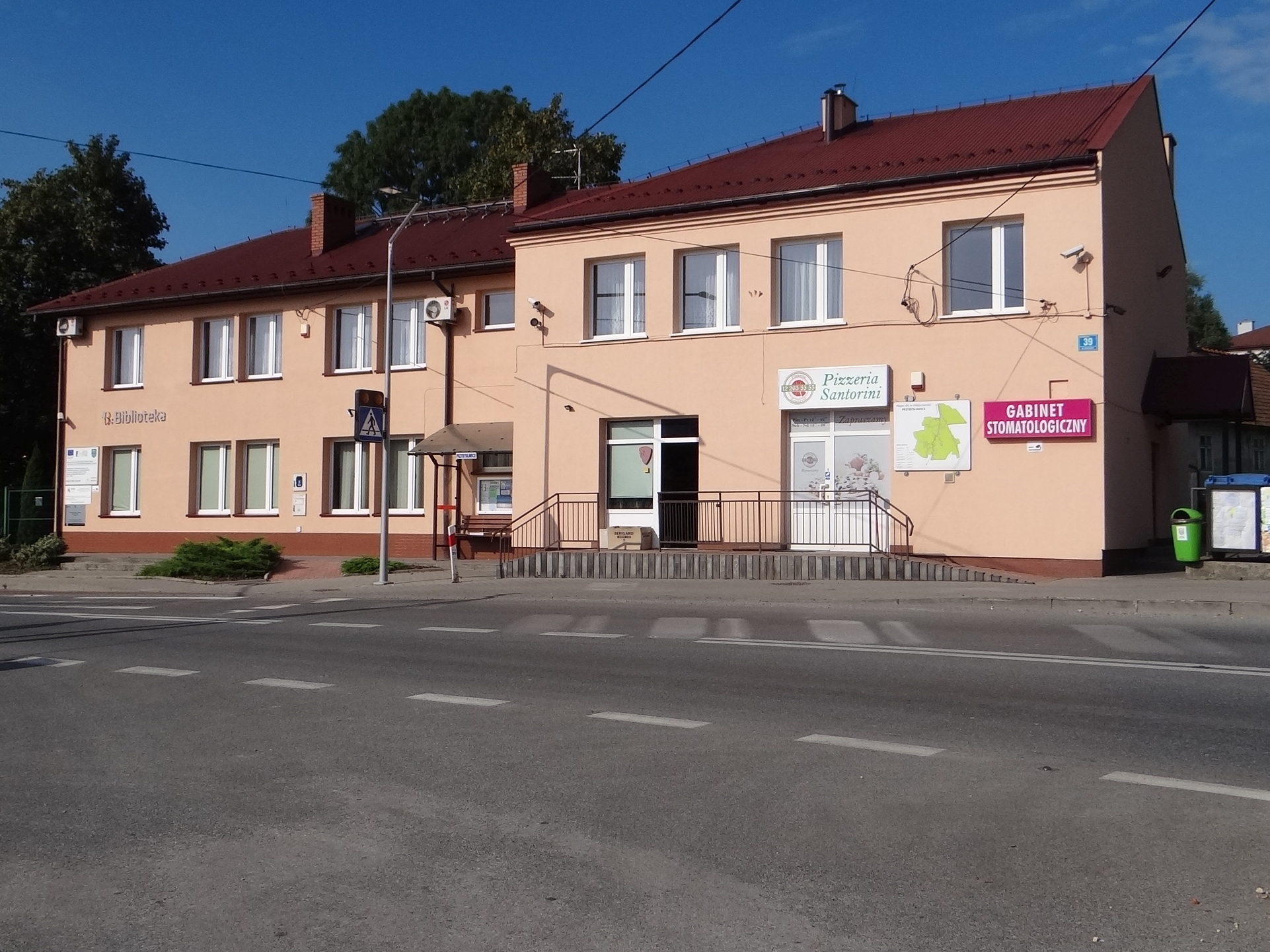

- Location within Poland
- Coordinates: 50°9′27″N 19°53′41″E
- Country: Poland
- Voivodeship: Lesser Poland
- County: Kraków
- Gmina: Zielonki
- Elevation: 311 m (1,020 ft)
- Population: 772

Przybysławice [pʂɨbɨswaˈvit͡sɛ] is a village in the administrative district of Gmina Zielonki, within Kraków County, Lesser Poland Voivodeship, in southern Poland.
