= Brzozówka, Kraków County =

Brzozówka
- Village
- Location within Poland
- Coordinates: 50°10′22″N 19°53′51″E
- Country: Poland
- Voivodeship: Lesser Poland
- County: Kraków
- Gmina: Zielonki
- Population: 380

Brzozówka [bʐɔˈzufka] is a village in the administrative district of Gmina Zielonki, within Kraków County, Lesser Poland Voivodeship, in southern Poland.
