= Bieniek =

Bieniek is a surname. Notable people with the surname include:

- Mateusz Bieniek (born 1994), Polish volleyball player
- Michał Bieniek (born 1984), Polish high jumper
- Zdzisław Bieniek (1930–2017), Polish footballer

== See also ==
- Bienek
