= Garliczka =

- Village
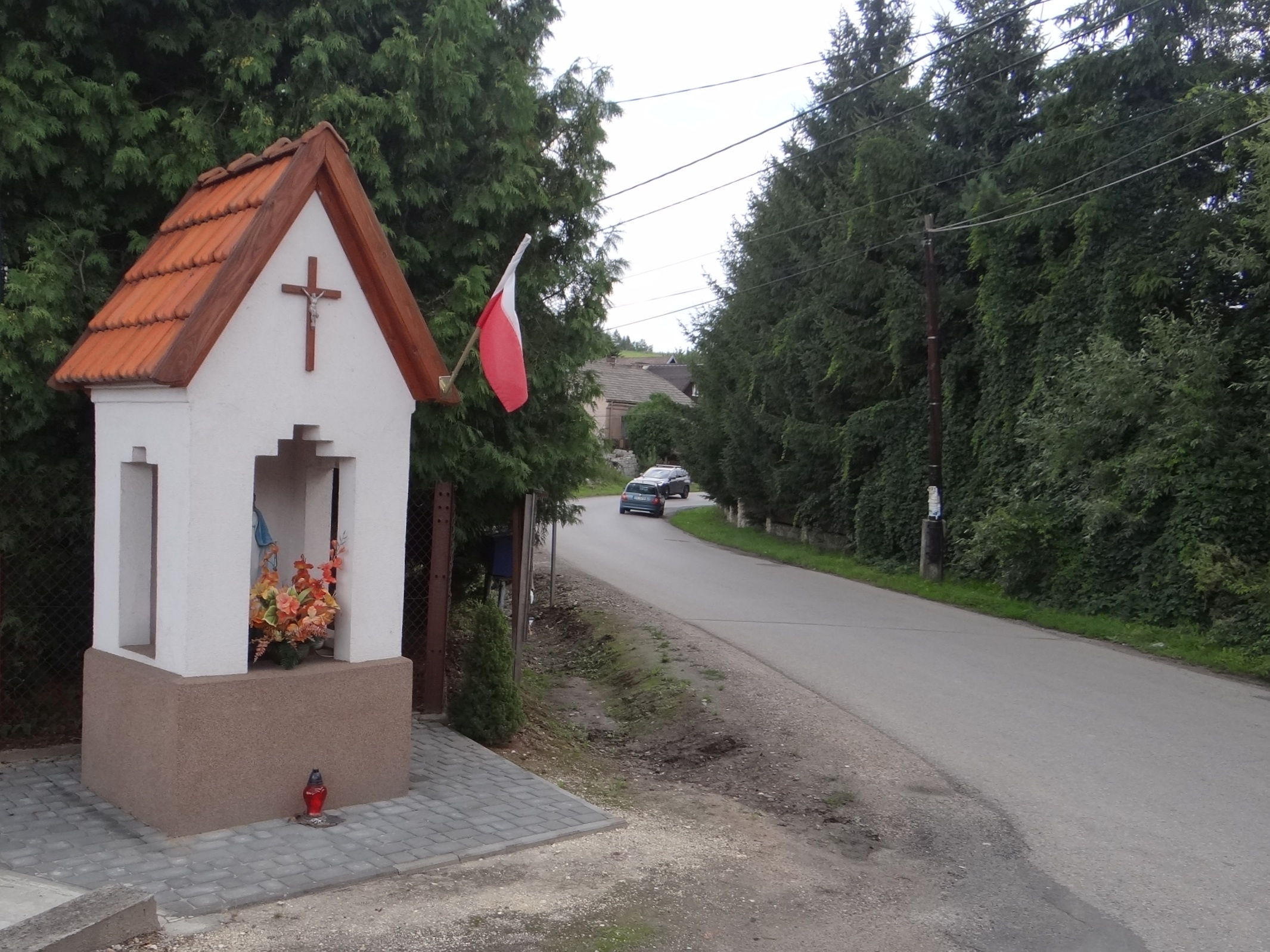
- Chapel

- Location within Poland
- Coordinates: 50°9′6″N 19°55′17″E
- Country: Poland
- Voivodeship: Lesser Poland
- County: Kraków
- Gmina: Zielonki
- Population: 300

Garliczka [ɡarˈlit͡ʂka] is a village in the administrative district of Gmina Zielonki, within Kraków County, Lesser Poland Voivodeship, in southern Poland.
