= Wola Zachariaszowska =

- Village
- Location within Poland
- Coordinates: 50°9′14″N 19°56′16″E
- Country: Poland
- Voivodeship: Lesser Poland
- County: Kraków
- Gmina: Zielonki
- Population: 320

Wola Zachariaszowska [ˈvɔla zaxarjaˈʂɔfska] is a village in the administrative district of Gmina Zielonki, within Kraków County, Lesser Poland Voivodeship, in southern Poland.
