= Trojanowice, Lesser Poland Voivodeship =

Trojanowice
- Village
- Location within Poland
- Coordinates: 50°8′28″N 19°54′34″E
- Country: Poland
- Voivodeship: Lesser Poland
- County: Kraków
- Gmina: Zielonki

Trojanowice [trɔjanɔˈvit͡sɛ] is a village in the administrative district of Gmina Zielonki, within Kraków County, Lesser Poland Voivodeship, in southern Poland.
