= Grębynice =

- Village
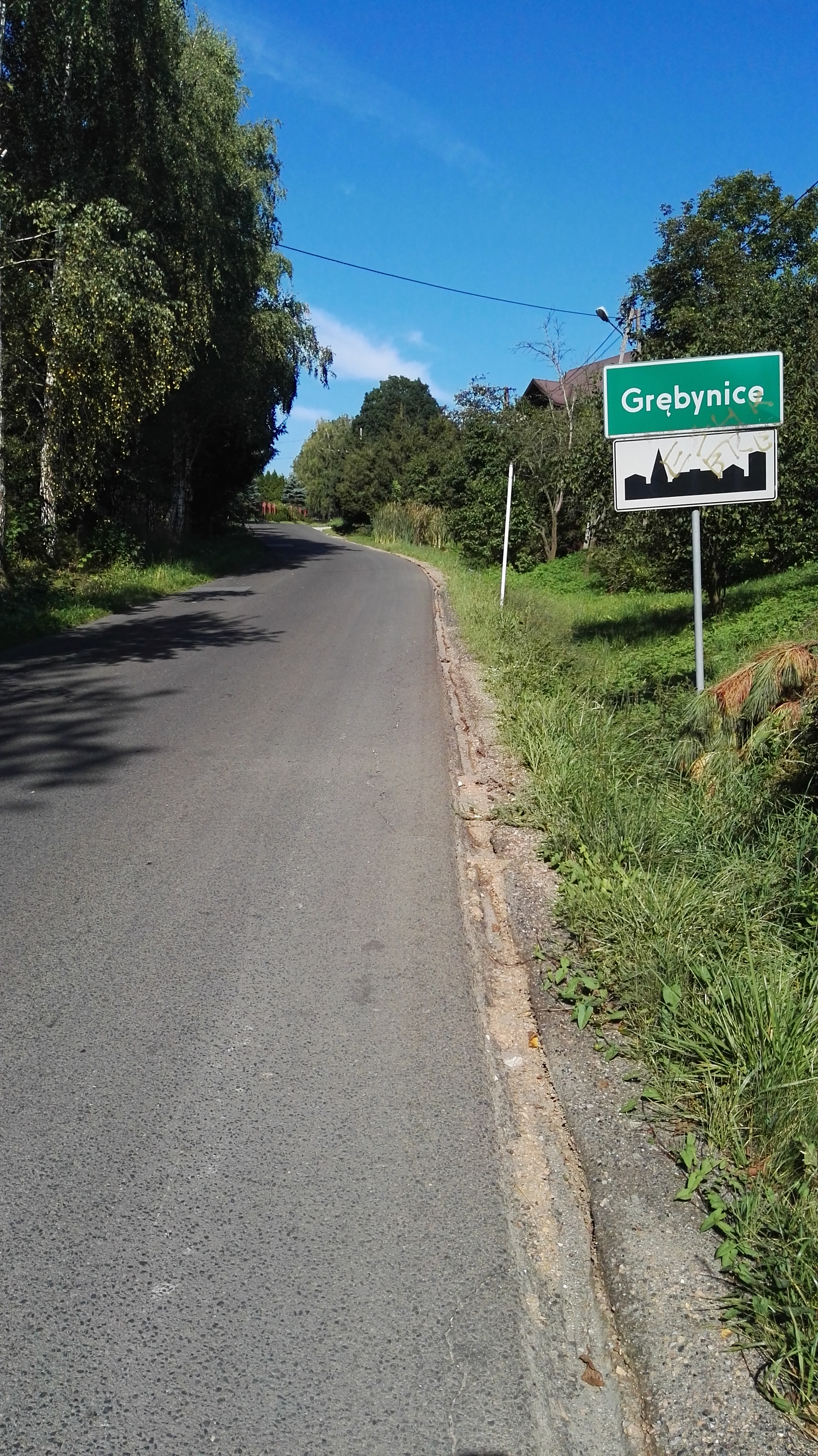

- Location within Poland
- Coordinates: 50°9′57″N 19°52′9″E
- Country: Poland
- Voivodeship: Lesser Poland
- County: Kraków
- Gmina: Zielonki
- Population: 290

Grębynice [ɡrɛmbɨˈnit͡sɛ] is a village in the administrative district of Gmina Zielonki, within Kraków County, Lesser Poland Voivodeship, in southern Poland.
