= Prądnik bread =

Polish rye bread

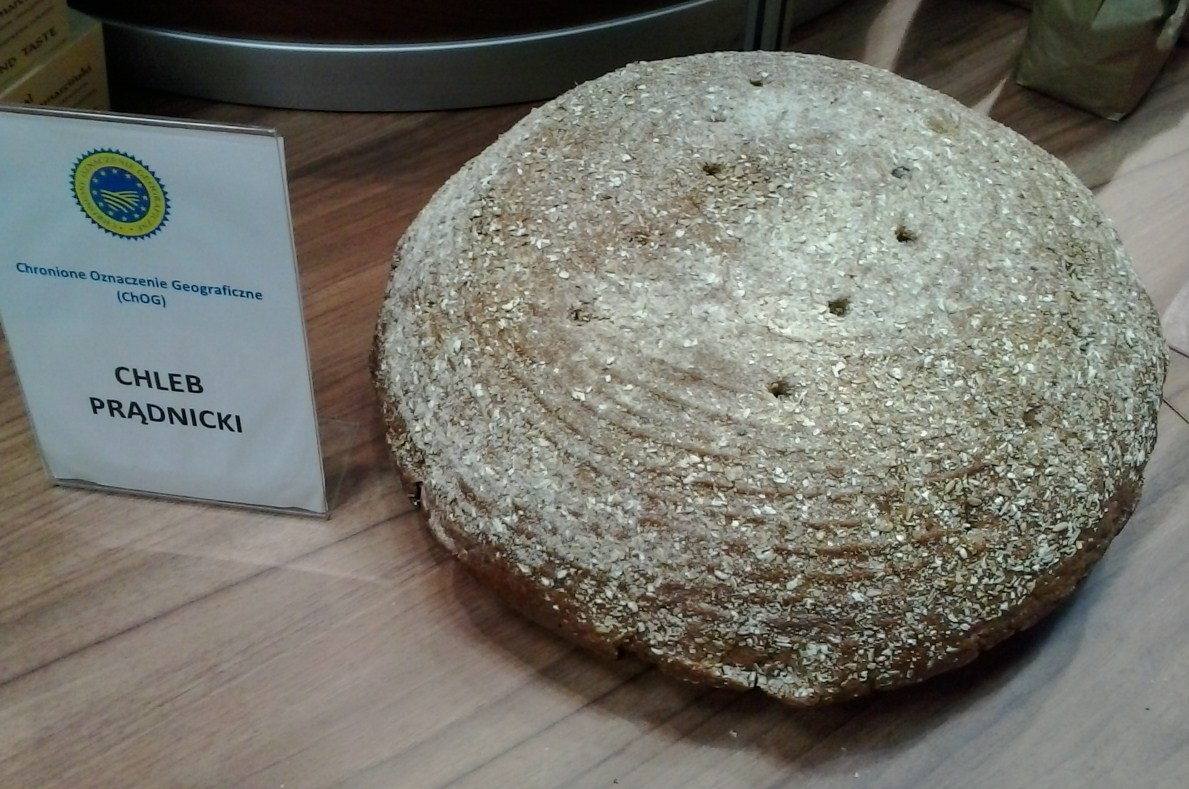
- Prądnik bread
- Alternative names: Chleb prądnicki
- Type: Bread
- Course: Bread
- Place of origin: Poland
- Serving temperature: Cold
- Main ingredients: Dough: Rye

Prądnik bread (Polish: Chleb prądnicki) - is a traditional rye bread baked in Kraków. The bread may be produced in huge loaves amounting to 14 kg. It is a Protected Geographical Indication product under geographical indications and traditional specialities in the European Union.

Prądnik bread was produced in villages located on the banks of the Prądnik River - in Prądnik Czerwony and Prądnik Biały, from the fourteenth century. Formerly, the river's upper course gravitational potential energy was harvested to power watermills for milling flour. The oldest document to mention Prądnik bread originates from 1421, when the Bishop of Kraków, Albert granted his cook two plots (źreb) of land by the Prądnik River and obligated him to bake bread for the bishopric.

By royal prerogative, on May 26, 1496, King John I Albert gave the bakers from Prądnik (among others) the right to sell bread in Kraków once a week, during the market occurring on Tuesdays. The sale and production of bread by bakers outside of Kraków had been restricted, the non-resident bakers only receiving full commercial rights in 1785.
