= Bosutów =

Village in Gmina Zielonki, Kraków County, Poland

- Village
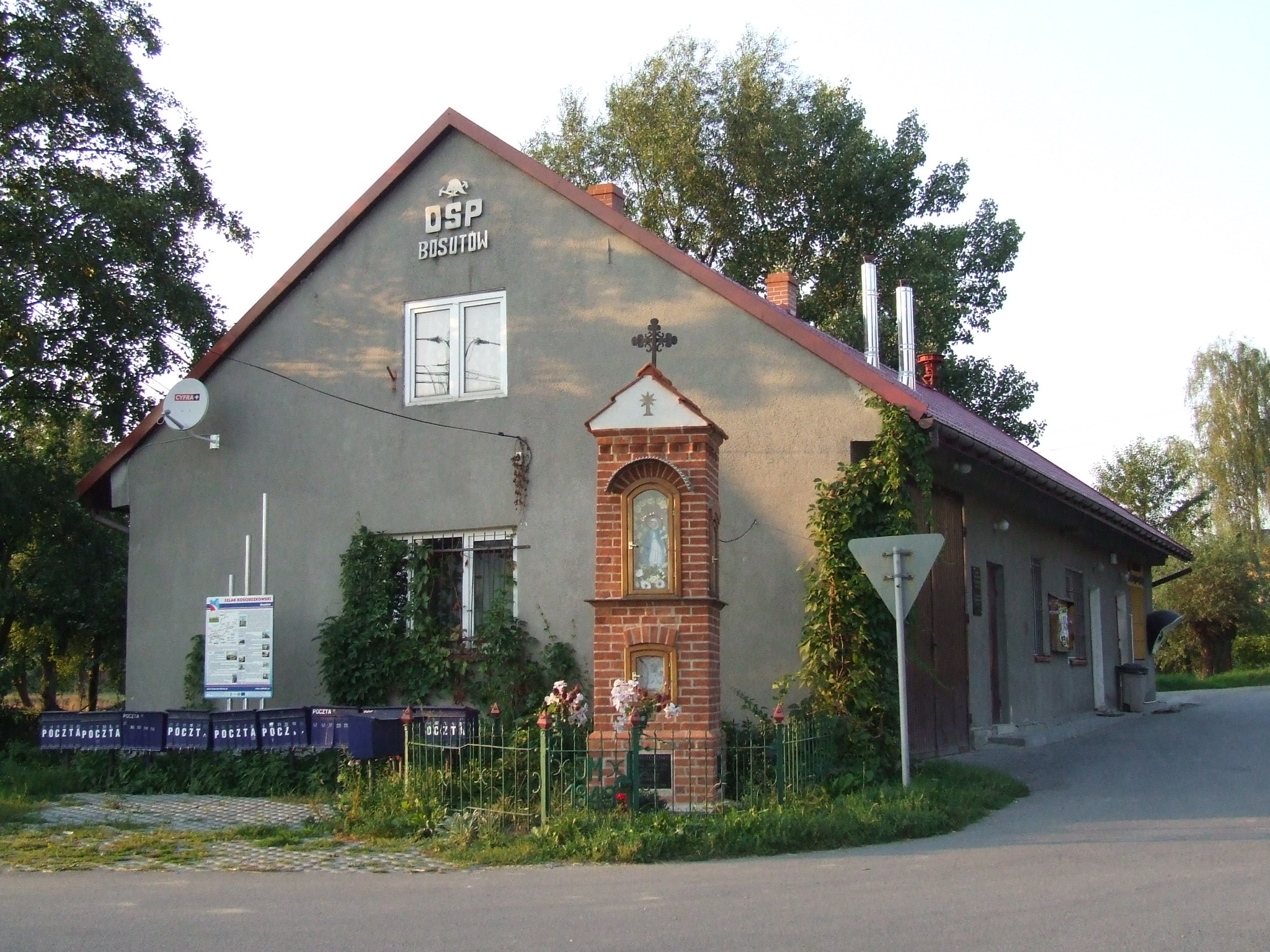
- Voluntary fire brigade building

- Location within Poland
- Coordinates: 50°7′29″N 19°59′37″E
- Country: Poland
- Voivodeship: Lesser Poland
- County: Kraków
- Gmina: Zielonki

Population
  - Total: 672

Bosutów [bɔˈsutuf] is a village in the administrative district of Gmina Zielonki, within Kraków County, Lesser Poland Voivodeship, in southern Poland. The village is located in the historical region Galicia.

== See also ==
- The Lesser Polish Way
