= Batowice =

- Village
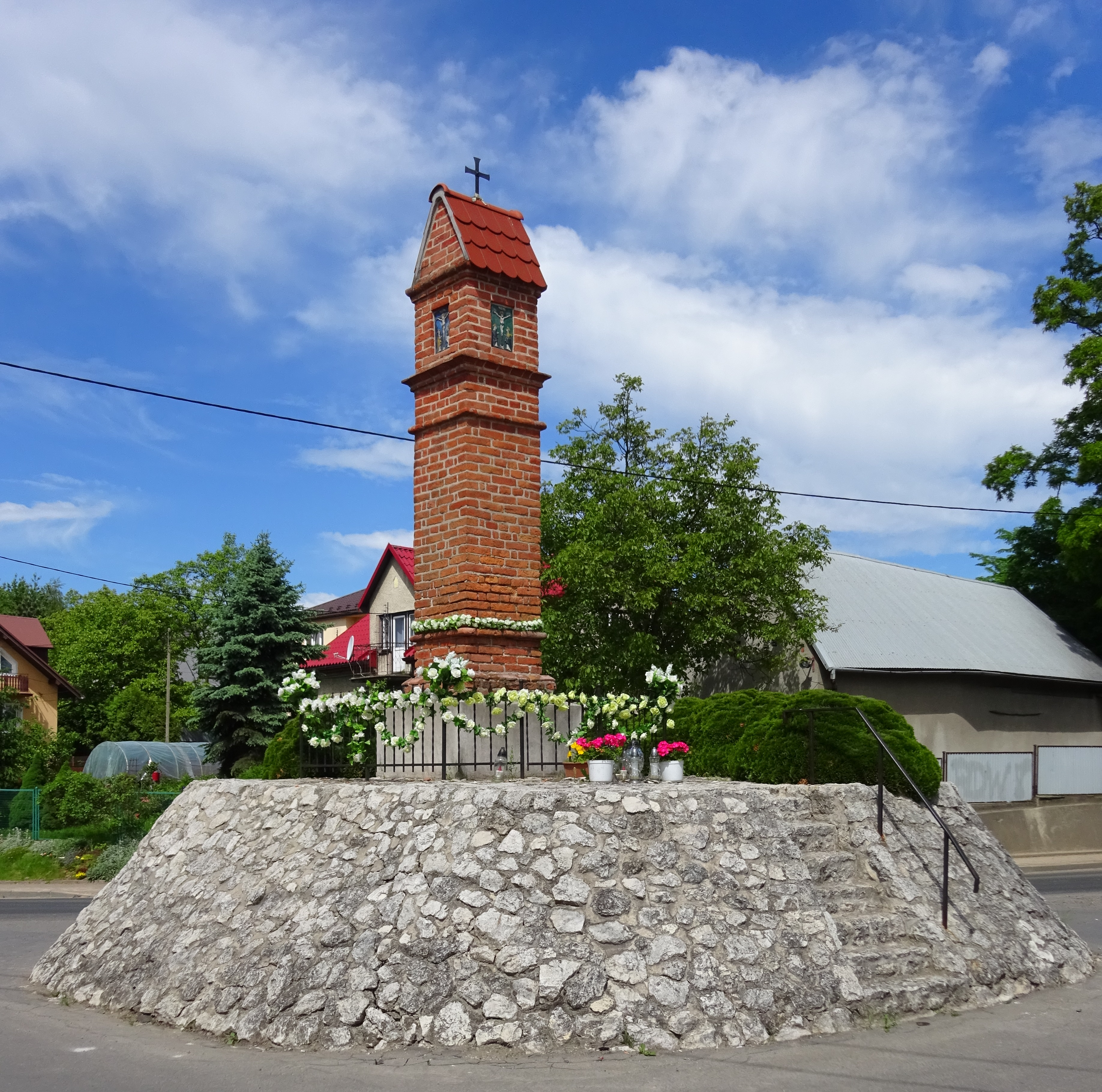
- Small chapel from the 17th century

- Location within Poland
- Coordinates: 50°6′42″N 20°0′59″E
- Country: Poland
- Voivodeship: Lesser Poland
- County: Kraków
- Gmina: Zielonki

Batowice [batɔˈvit͡sɛ] is a village in the administrative district of Gmina Zielonki, within Kraków County, Lesser Poland Voivodeship, in southern Poland. Batowice is also the name of a neighbourhood within the city of Kraków, part of Mistrzejowice district.
