= Owczary, Kraków County =

Owczary
- Village
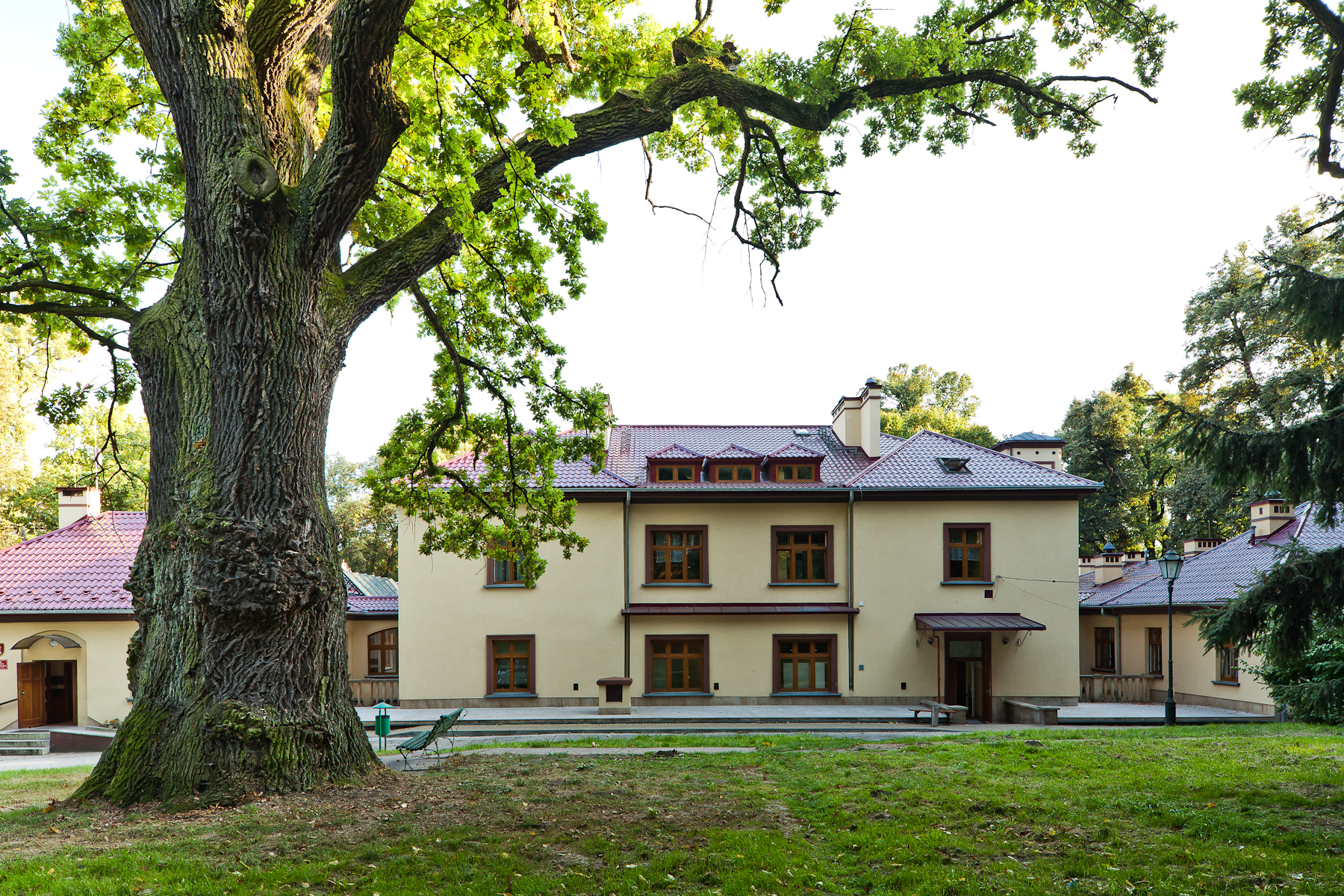
- Manor

- Location within Poland
- Coordinates: 50°10′25″N 19°54′47″E
- Country: Poland
- Voivodeship: Lesser Poland
- County: Kraków
- Gmina: Zielonki
- Population: 900

Owczary [ɔfˈt͡ʂarɨ] is a village in the administrative district of Gmina Zielonki, within Kraków County, Lesser Poland Voivodeship, in southern Poland.
