= Gmina Zielonki =

Gmina Zielonki Zielonki Commune
- Gmina
- Coat of arms
- Interactive map of Gmina Zielonki
- Coordinates (Zielonki): 50°7′N 19°55′E
- Country: Poland
- Voivodeship: Lesser Poland
- County: Kraków County
- Seat: Zielonki

Area
  - Total: 48.4 km^{2} (18.7 sq mi)

Population (2006)
  - Total: 15,740
  - Density: 325/km^{2} (842/sq mi)
- Website: http://www.zielonki.ug.pl

Gmina Zielonki is a rural community (Polish: gmina) in Kraków County, Lesser Poland Voivodeship, in southern Poland. Its seat is the village of Zielonki, which lies approximately 7 kilometres (4 mi) north of the regional capital Kraków.

The gmina covers an area of 48.4 square kilometres (18.7 sq mi), and as of 2006 its total population is 15,740.

The gmina contains part of the protected area called Dłubnia Landscape Park.

== Villages ==
Gmina Zielonki contains the villages and settlements of Batowice, Bibice, Boleń, Bosutów, Brzozówka, Dziekanowice, Garlica Duchowna, Garlica Murowana, Garliczka, Grębynice, Januszowice, Korzkiew, Osiedle Łokietka, Owczary, Pękowice, Przybysławice, Trojanowice, Węgrzce, Wola Zachariaszowska and Zielonki.

== Neighbouring gminas ==
Gmina Zielonki is bordered by the city of Kraków and by the gminas of Iwanowice, Michałowice, Skała and Wielka Wieś.
