= Boleń, Lesser Poland Voivodeship =

Boleń
- Village
- Location within Poland
- Coordinates: 50°8′3″N 19°58′33″E
- Country: Poland
- Voivodeship: Lesser Poland
- County: Kraków
- Gmina: Zielonki
- Population: 672
- Website: http://www.zielonki.pl/

Boleń [ˈbɔlɛɲ] is a village in the administrative district of Gmina Zielonki, within Kraków County, Lesser Poland Voivodeship, in southern Poland. The village is located in the historical region Galicia.
