= Sąspówka =

River in Poland

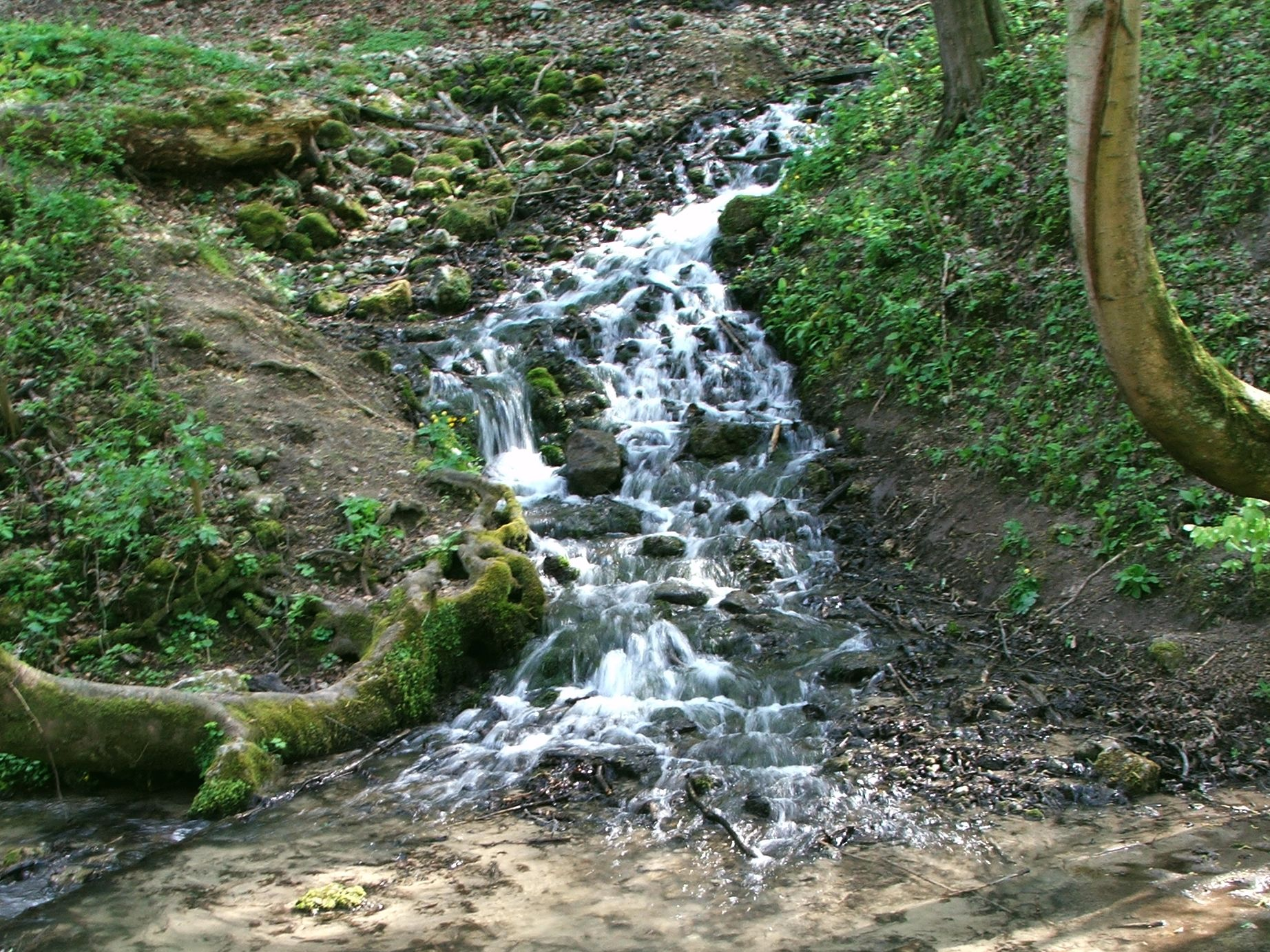

Location
- Country: Poland

Physical characteristics
- Mouth
  - location: Prądnik
  - coordinates: 50°12′12″N 19°49′44″E

Basin features
- Progression: Prądnik→ Vistula→ Baltic Sea

Sąspówka is a river of Poland, a tributary of the Prądnik at Ojców.
