= Prądniczanka Kraków =

Polish football club

- Full name: Klub Sportowy Prądniczanka Kraków
- Founded: 1921; 104 years ago
- Ground: Władysław Kawula Municipal Stadium
- Capacity: 1,224
- Chairman: Jerzy Starmach
- Manager: Jakub Nowak
- League: Regional league Kraków II
- 2023–24: Regional league Kraków II, 5th of 14
- Website: http://pradniczanka.krakow.pl
Home colours	Away colours

Prądniczanka Kraków (Klub Sportowy Prądniczanka Kraków) is a Polish football club based in Prądnik Czerwony district of Kraków. They currently play in the Polish regional league, the sixth tier of the Polish football league.

It is a multi-sport club, in addition to the football section (both men and women), it also has basketball and volleyball sections.

== History ==
Prądniczanka Kraków dates its foundation to 1921, to the merger of two clubs, "Wezuwiusz" and "Zadworze". Initially the club remained under the name "Wezuwiusz", but in 1924 it was renamed as "Klub Sportowy Prądniczanka".

== Squad ==
As of 28 March 2021

Note: Flags indicate national team as defined under FIFA eligibility rules; some limited exceptions apply. Players may hold more than one non-FIFA nationality.

No.	Pos.	Nation	Player
1	GK	(Poland) POL	Szymon Wieczorek
2		(Poland) POL	Andrzej Kawa
3		(Poland) POL	Maciej Rogóż
4		(Poland) POL	Michał Półtorak
5		(Poland) POL	Mateusz Przesławski
6		(Poland) POL	Kacper Olkuski
7		(Poland) POL	Jakub Kostuj
8		(Poland) POL	Arkadiusz Pępkowski
9		(Poland) POL	Krzysztof Grudnik
10		(Poland) POL	Kacper Wadowski
11		(Poland) POL	Łukasz Sędłak
12		(Poland) POL	Michał Mielecki

No.	Pos.	Nation	Player
13		(Poland) POL	Jakub Polniak
15		(Poland) POL	Tomasz Florek
16		(Poland) POL	Bartołomiej Podkowa
17		(Poland) POL	Adam Śmigacz
18		(Poland) POL	Kamil Sąder
19		(Poland) POL	Patryk Starczyński
21		(Poland) POL	Łukasz Paciorek
91		(Poland) POL	Patryk Mleczko
—	GK	(Poland) POL	Bartołomiej Fojt
—		(Poland) POL	Mikołaj Szuba
—		(Poland) POL	Patryk Czech

== Notable players ==
- (Poland) Władysław Kawula
- (Poland) Antoni Łyko
- (Poland) Mirosław Szymkowiak

== Current coaching staff ==
As of 19 September 2024

Head coach	(Poland) Jakub Nowak
Fitness coach	(Poland) Wojciech Żuchowicz
