= Mining machinery engineering =

Branch of engineering

Mining machinery engineering is an interdisciplinary branch of engineering that applies the principles of mechanical engineering and electrical engineering for analysis, design, manufacturing and maintenance of mining equipment. It includes study of various aspects of equipment used in earthworks, mineral processing, bulk material handling, drilling and construction.

== History ==
Surface mining equipment evolved at a high pace in the 20th century as the scale of mining grew. In the first twenty years of the 1900s, steam power was largely replaced by internal combustion engines and electric motors. Till the 1970s such equipment mainly used mechanical systems and cables for power transmission after which they started to be replaced by hydraulic drive system for small machines. However, mechanical and cable drives are still dominant in large machines. A similar development took place in the development of underground machinery. Drilling and blasting replaced manual cutting of ores. Lately, the use of continuous mining machines has become the order of the day to comply with environmental regulations, protect surface features, and also achieve an increased production rate. As the concern for safety in mines increased and highly stringent regulations were put in place, it required mining machinery engineers to be highly conversant with such regulations.
