= Antoni Konopelski =

Polish footballer

Personal information
- Full name: Antoni Jerzy Konopelski
- Date of birth: 14 June 1929
- Place of birth: Lviv, Poland
- Date of death: 28 February 1977 (aged 47)
- Place of death: Kraków, Poland
- Height: 1.79 m (5 ft 10 in)
- Positions: Defender; striker

Senior career*
| Years | Team | Apps | (Gls) |
- Korona Kraków
| 1950–1956 | Włókniarz Kraków | | |
| 1957–1958 | Stal Sosnowiec | | |
| 1959–1965 | Cracovia | | |

International career
| 1956 | Poland | 1 | (0) |
- * Club domestic league appearances and goals

Antoni Jerzy Konopelski (14 June 1929 – 28 February 1977) was a Polish footballer. He played in one match for the Poland national football team in 1956.
