= Bienek =

Bienek is a surname. Notable people with the surname include:

- Horst Bienek (1930–1990), German novelist and poet
- Lewis Bienek (born 1998), English rugby league footballer

== See also ==
- Bieniek
