= Pękowice =

- Village
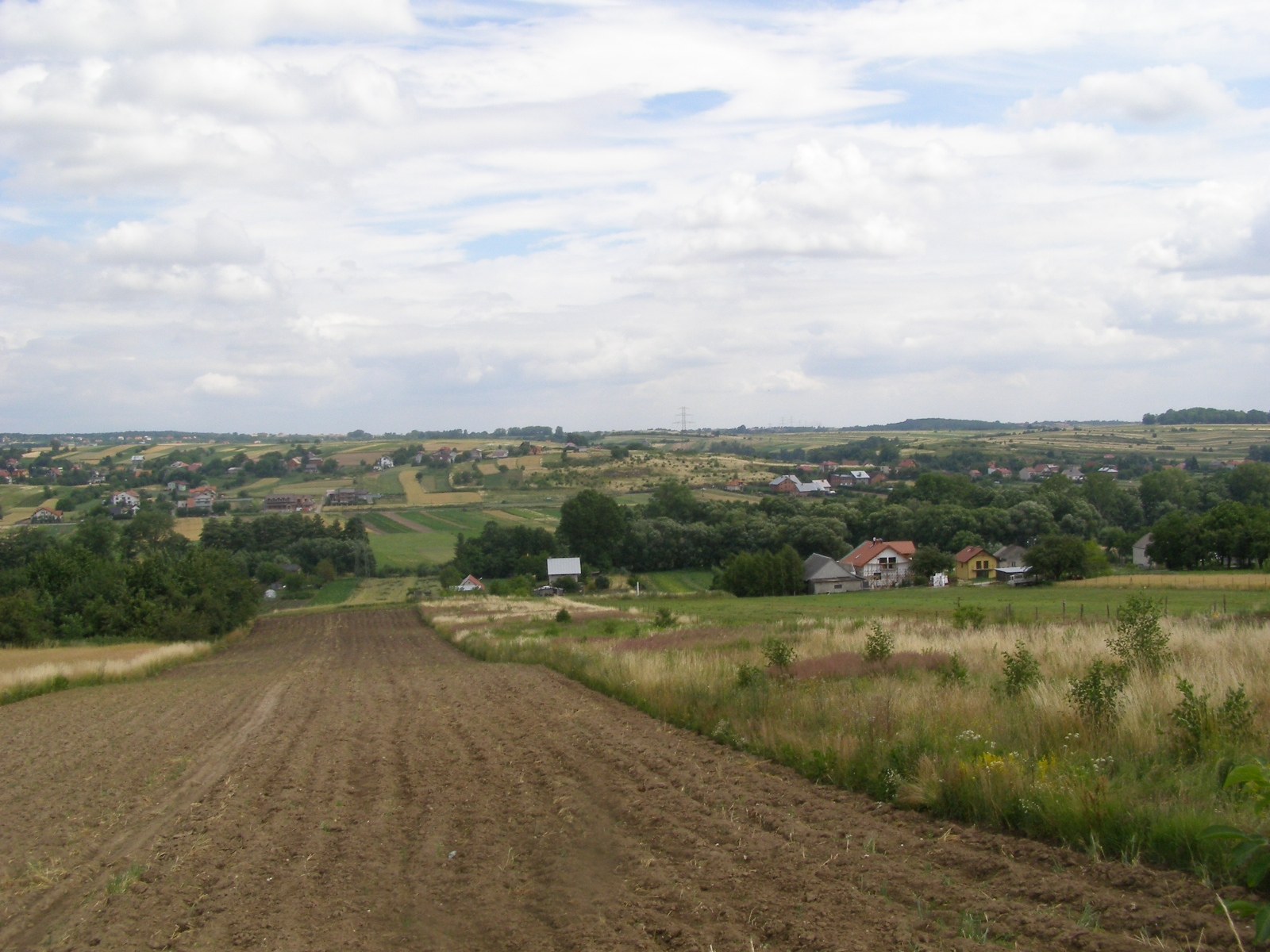

- Location within Poland
- Coordinates: 50°7′39″N 19°54′16″E
- Country: Poland
- Voivodeship: Lesser Poland
- County: Kraków
- Gmina: Zielonki
- Population: 533

Pękowice [pɛŋkɔˈvit͡sɛ] is a village in the administrative district of Gmina Zielonki, within Kraków County, Lesser Poland Voivodeship, in southern Poland. The village is located in the historical region Galicia.
