= Mieczysław Wawrzusiak =

Polish footballer (1928–1994)

Personal information
- Full name: Mieczysław Wawrzusiak
- Date of birth: 21 October 1928
- Place of birth: Kraków, Poland
- Date of death: 4 September 1994 (aged 65)
- Place of death: Kraków, Poland
- Height: 1.72 m (5 ft 8 in)
- Position: Midfielder

Youth career
- –1945: Zwierzyniecki Kraków

Senior career*
Years	Team	Apps	(Gls)
1945–1948	Zwierzyniecki Kraków		
1948–1949	Lechia Gdańsk	7	(0)
1949–1950	Zwierzyniecki Kraków		
1951	AKS Chorzów		
1951	Polonia Przemyśl		
1952	Lechia Gdańsk	10	(4)
1953–1956	Cracovia	49	(6)
1956–?	Zwierzyniecki Kraków		
- * Club domestic league appearances and goals

Mieczysław Wawrzusiak (21 October 1928 – 4 September 1994) was a Polish footballer who played as a midfielder.

== Biography ==
Wawrzusiak was born in Kraków and started playing football for his local team Zwierzyniecki Kraków, making his first team debut in 1945. It was with Zwierzyniecki that Wawrzusiak is most remembered for. In 1948 he joined Lechia Gdańsk for a season, making 7 appearances in the league. After one season with Lechia he rejoined Zwierzyniecki for the following season, before having short term spells with AKS Chorzów and Polonia Przemyśl, before he rejoined Lechia making a further 10 appearances scoring 4 goals. In 1953 he moved back to Kraków to play with Cracovia. During his time with Cracovia he played 49 games, 40 of those coming in the I liga. In 1956 he rejoined Zwierzyniecki Kraków where he spent the rest of his career. He died on 4 September 1994. In 2011, Zwierzyniecki Kraków's 90th anniversary, Wawrzusiak was honoured with being Zwierzyniecki's greatest ever academy graduate.

== Personal life ==
He is the nephew of former Wisła Kraków and Poland international goalkeeper Maksymilian Koźmin, and the uncle of former Wisła Kraków and ŁKS Łódź goalkeeper Janusz Adamczyk.
