= Januszowice, Gmina Zielonki =

Januszowice
- Village
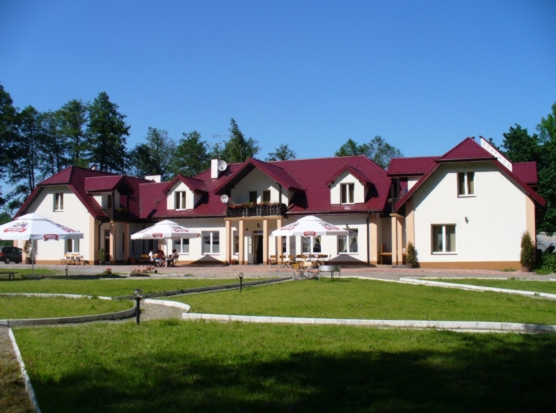

- Location within Poland
- Coordinates: 50°8′44″N 19°53′44″E
- Country: Poland
- Voivodeship: Lesser Poland
- County: Kraków
- Gmina: Zielonki

Januszowice [januʂɔˈvit͡sɛ] is a village in the administrative district of Gmina Zielonki, within Kraków County, Lesser Poland Voivodeship, in southern Poland.
