= Július Jakoby =

Slovak painter

- Born: Gyula Jakoby; 28 March 1903; Kassa, Kingdom of Hungary, Austria-Hungary
- Died: 15 April 1985 (aged 82); Košice, Czechoslovakia
- Education: Hungarian University of Fine Arts
- Known for: Painting
- Notable work: Woman Act (1932); By the river (around 1950); Architect's portrait (around 1962)
- Movement: Symbolism

Július Jakoby (born as Gyula Jakoby, Košice, Kingdom of Hungary, 28 March 1903 – Košice, Czechoslovak Socialist Republic, 15 April 1985) was a Slovak painter of Hungarian ancestry. Jakoby was a prominent figure of Slovakia's modernist art.

His image is that of a loner, living on the fringe of society, struggling for survival at the start of his career. His work is deeply tied to the small town atmosphere of Košice and its people, whose macrocosm can be seen in most of his works. In formal terms his work reflects secessionist expressionism and symbolism of Konštantín Kövári-Kačmárik and the Hungarian symbolism of Károly Férenczy and József Rippl-Rónai.

The works of Július Jakoby are exhibited in Slovak national gallery, National Gallery in Prague and Hungarian National Gallery and in many Slovak art museums and private collections. The biggest collection of his work is held in East Slovak Gallery in Košice.

His achievements are commemorated by a statue in the centre of his hometown of Košice, where he spent most of his life.

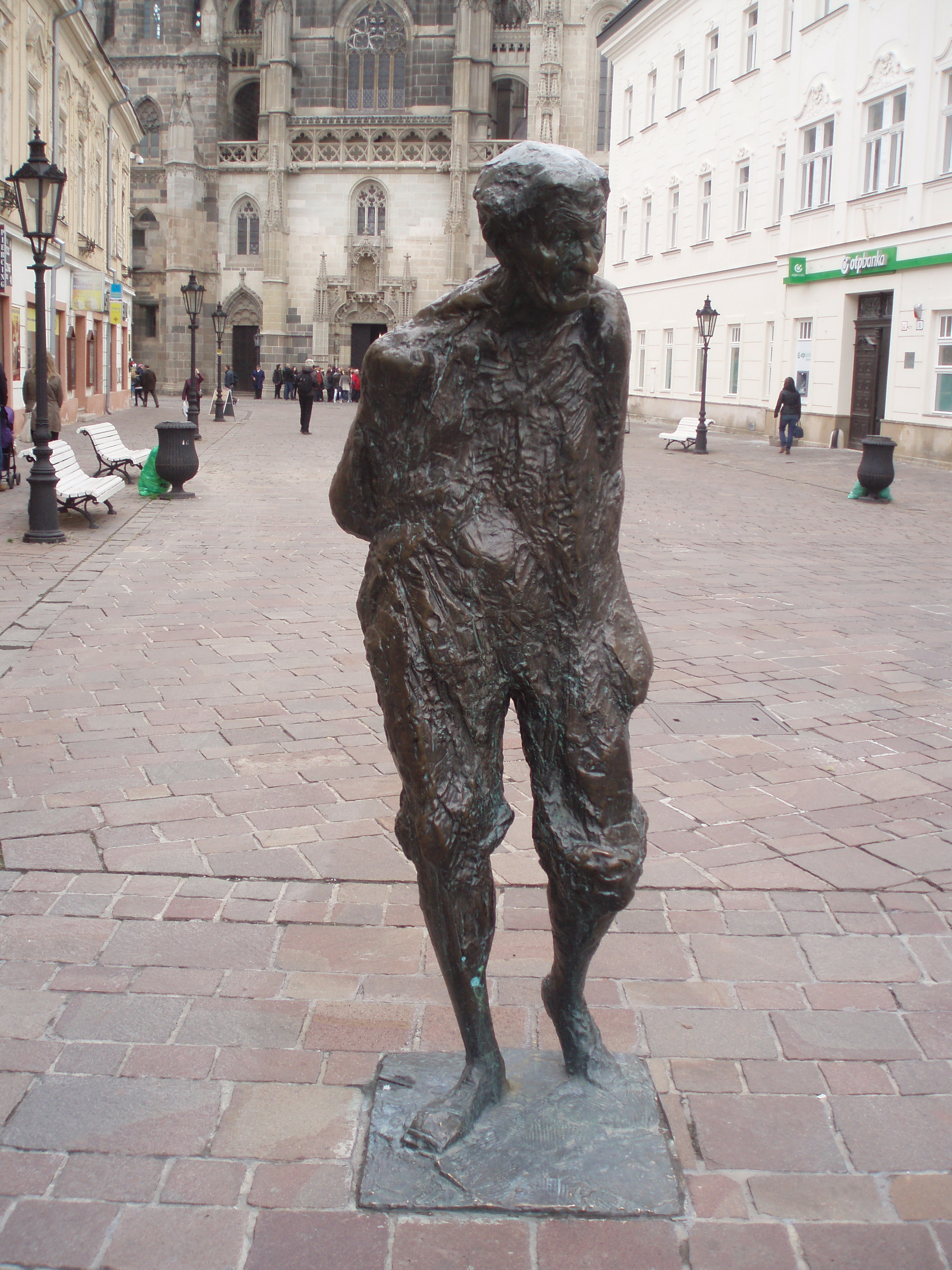
Jakoby Gyula statue in Košice
