= Garlica Duchowna =

- Village
- Location within Poland
- Coordinates: 50°8′44″N 19°55′25″E
- Country: Poland
- Voivodeship: Lesser Poland
- County: Kraków
- Gmina: Zielonki
- Population: 200

Garlica Duchowna [ɡarˈlit͡sa duˈxɔvna] is a village in the administrative district of Gmina Zielonki, within Kraków County, Lesser Poland Voivodeship, in southern Poland.
