= Władysław Kawula Municipal Stadium =

Football stadium in Poland

Coordinates: 50°05′N 19°58′E

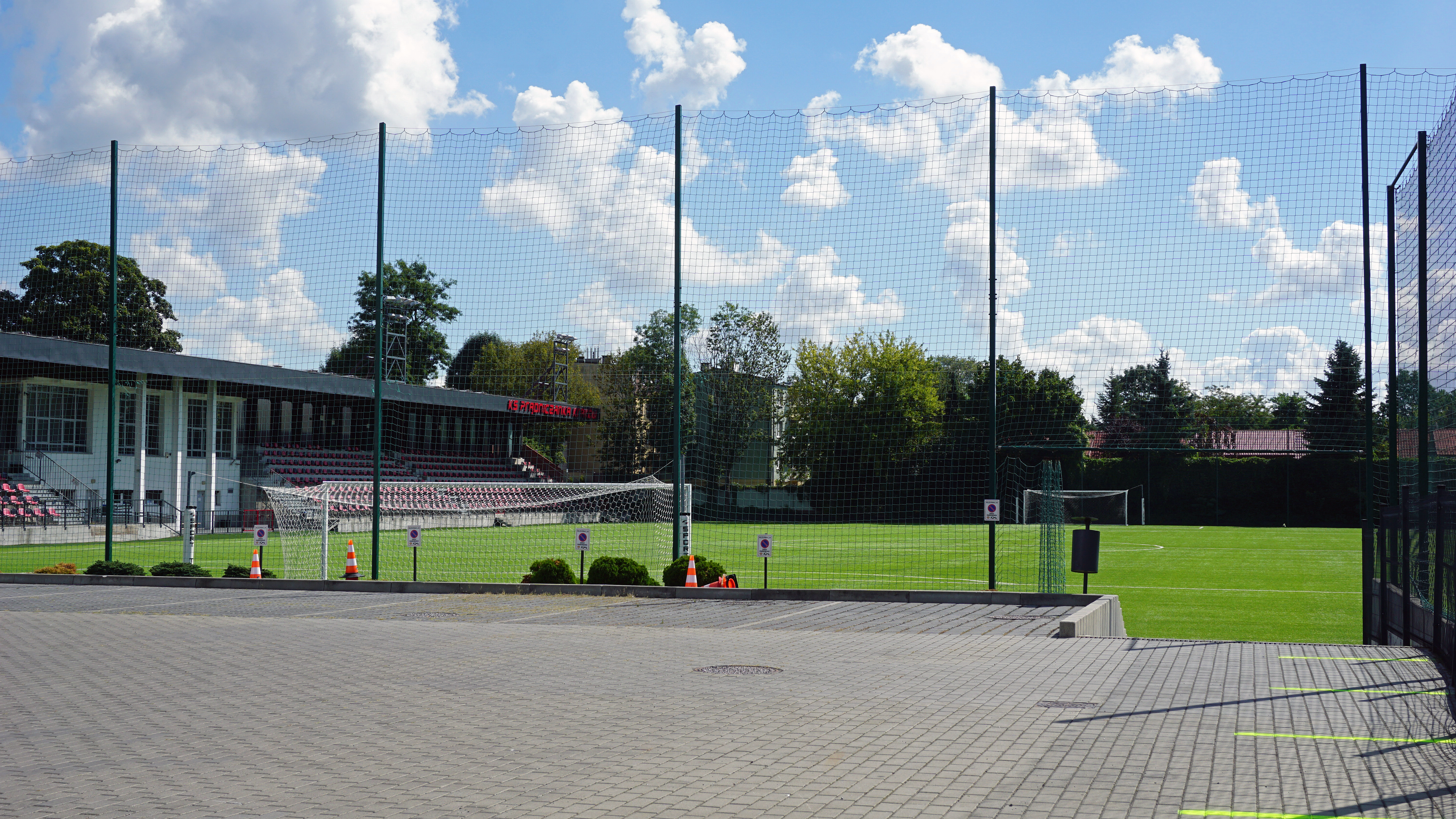
Władysław Kawula Municipal Stadium, 5 Andrzej Babola Street, Kraków, Poland

The Władysław Kawula Municipal Stadium (Polish: Stadion Miejski im. Władysława Kawuli) is a football stadium in Kraków, Poland at 5 Saint Andrzej Babola Street.

Modernized in 2018, it is home to the sports club Prądniczanka Kraków. It has an artificial turf ground, and has 1,224 seating capacity in roofed stand. Poland national amputee football team played their matches at the 2021 European Amputee Football Championship in this stadium.
