= Marian Machowski =

Polish footballer (1932–2022)

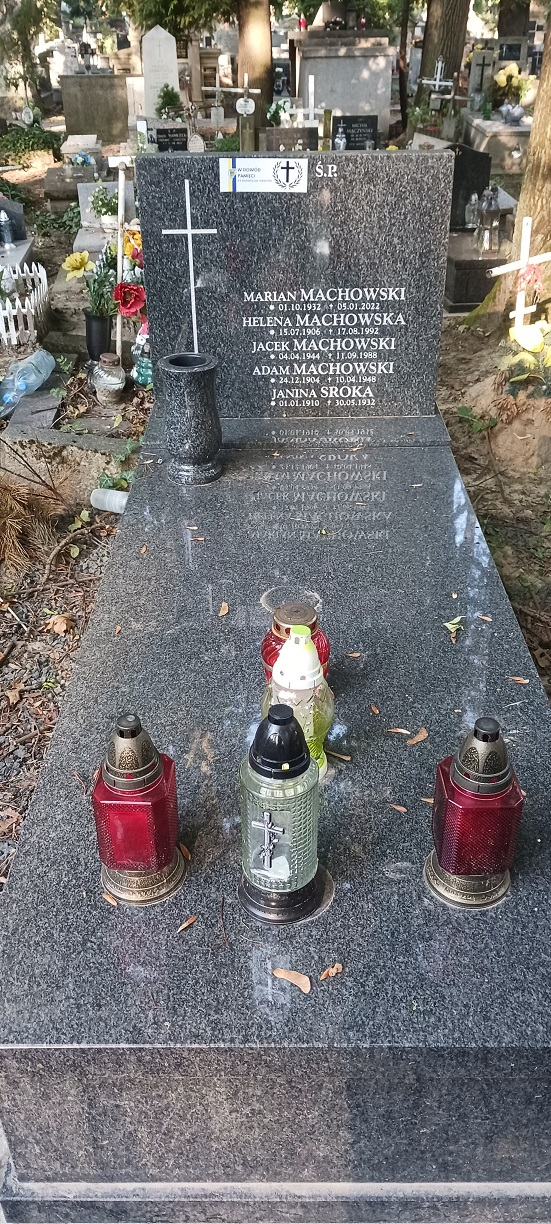
- The grave of Machowski at the Rakowicki Cemetery in Krakow

Personal information
- Date of birth: 1 October 1932
- Place of birth: Kraków, Poland
- Date of death: 5 January 2022 (aged 89)
- Height: 1.76 m (5 ft 9 in)
- Position: Right winger

Senior career*
Years	Team	Apps	(Gls)
- Nadwiślan Kraków
1950–1963	Wisła Kraków	181	(51)
1963	A.A.C. Eagles		

International career
1956	Poland	1	(0)
- * Club domestic league appearances and goals

Marian Machowski (1 October 1932 – 5 January 2022) was a Polish footballer and researcher specialising in the field of mining and mining machinery. As a footballer, he played as a right winger, spending most of his career with Wisła Kraków. He made one appearance for the Poland national team in 1956.

== Career ==
Born in Kraków on 1 October 1932, Machowski was the son of a footballer who played for Lauda Kraków. He lived with his family in Ludwinów and later in Kazimierz. After World War II, he became a player of Nadwiślan Kraków before joining Wisła Kraków. At Wisła Kraków, Machowski first played for the club's reserve team and then, from 1953, for the first team. He made 194 appearances scoring 56 goals, of which 181 appearances and 51 goals came in the league. He made one appearance for the Poland national team in 1956, appearing in a 2–1 loss against Bulgaria in Wrocław. He ended his career at A.A.C. Eagles.

== Style of play ==
A right winger, Machowski was known for his stamina, speed and creativity. Gazeta Krakowska described him as a "brave, relentless and aggressive" player.

== Post-playing life ==
After retiring from playing, Machowski became a coach at his former Wisła Kraków, leading the reserve and junior teams. In the late 1960s he was also an assistant to first team coach Mieczysław Gracz.

During his time as a footballer, Machowski graduated from AGH University of Science and Technology, a technical university in Kraków, and became a researcher specialising in the field of mining and mining machinery. He received various awards and distinctions for his teaching and research work in the field of monument protection, including the Gold Cross of Merit. He had 72 scientific works and seven patents to his name.

Machowski died on 5 January 2022, at the age of 89.
