= Garlica Murowana =

- Village
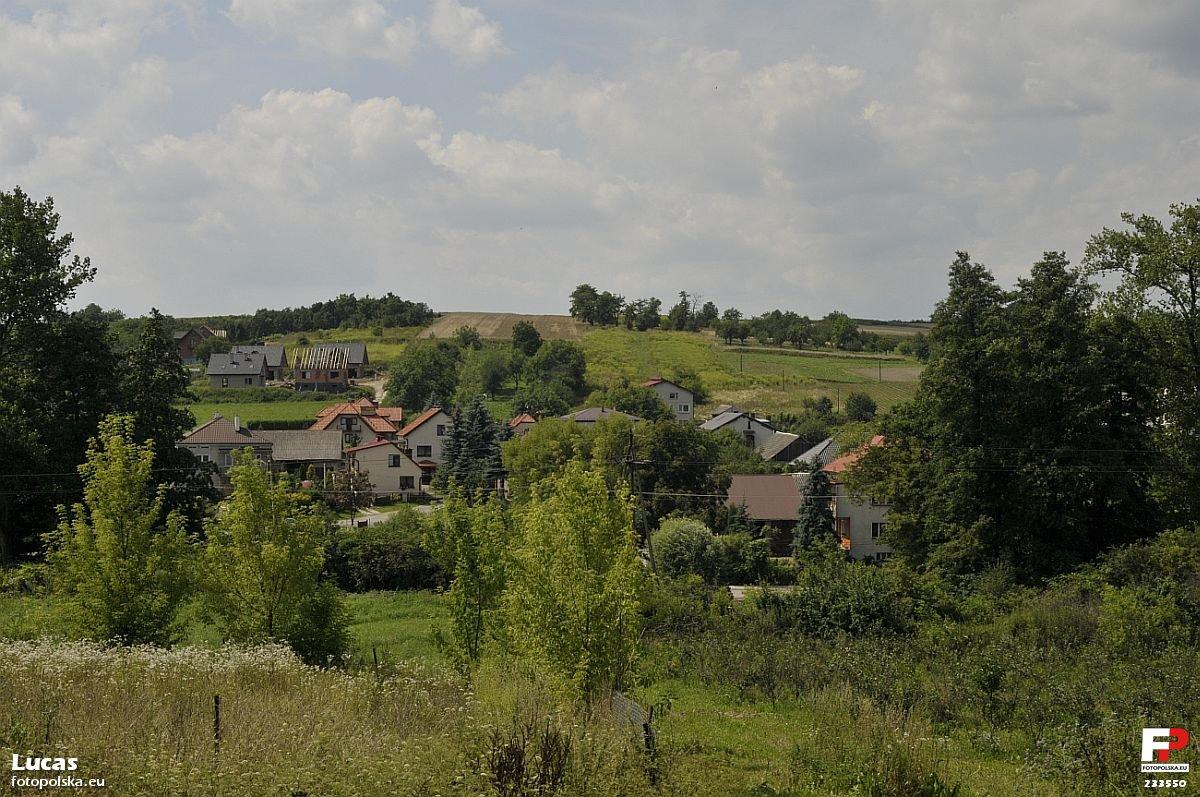

- Location within Poland
- Coordinates: 50°8′25″N 19°55′39″E
- Country: Poland
- Voivodeship: Lesser Poland
- County: Kraków
- Gmina: Zielonki
- Population: 330

Garlica Murowana [ɡarˈlit͡sa murɔˈvana] is a village in the administrative district of Gmina Zielonki, within Kraków County, Lesser Poland Voivodeship, in southern Poland. The village is located in the historical region Galicia.
