= Ignacy Dybała =

Polish footballer (1926–2016)

Personal information
- Date of birth: 25 January 1926
- Place of birth: Rybnik, Poland
- Date of death: 7 September 2016 (aged 90)
- Place of death: Rybnik, Poland
- Position: Left winger

Senior career*
Years	Team	Apps	(Gls)
1942–1944	Kopalnia Ema		
1945–1946	US Anconitana		
1947–1948	Rymer Rybnik		
1949–1960	Górnik Radlin		

International career
1950	Poland	1	(0)
- * Club domestic league appearances and goals

Ignacy Dybała (25 January 1926 – 7 September 2016) was a Polish footballer who played as a left winger.

He made one appearance for the Poland national team in 1950.
