= Zdzisław Bieniek =

Polish footballer (1930–2017)

Personal information
- Full name: Zdzisław Julian Bieniek
- Date of birth: 9 May 1930
- Place of birth: Kraków, Poland
- Date of death: 21 December 2017 (aged 87)
- Place of death: Kraków, Poland
- Height: 1.71 m (5 ft 7 in)
- Position: Midfielder

Senior career*
Years	Team	Apps	(Gls)
1945–1951	Garbarnia Kraków		
1951	Zawisza Bydgoszcz		
1952–1953	CWKS Warsaw	31	(2)
1953–1964	Garbarnia Kraków		

International career
1952–1954	Poland	7	(0)
- * Club domestic league appearances and goals

Zdzisław Julian Bieniek (9 May 1930 – 21 December 2017) was a Polish footballer who competed in the 1952 Summer Olympics.
