= Zielonki, Lesser Poland Voivodeship =

Zielonki
- Village
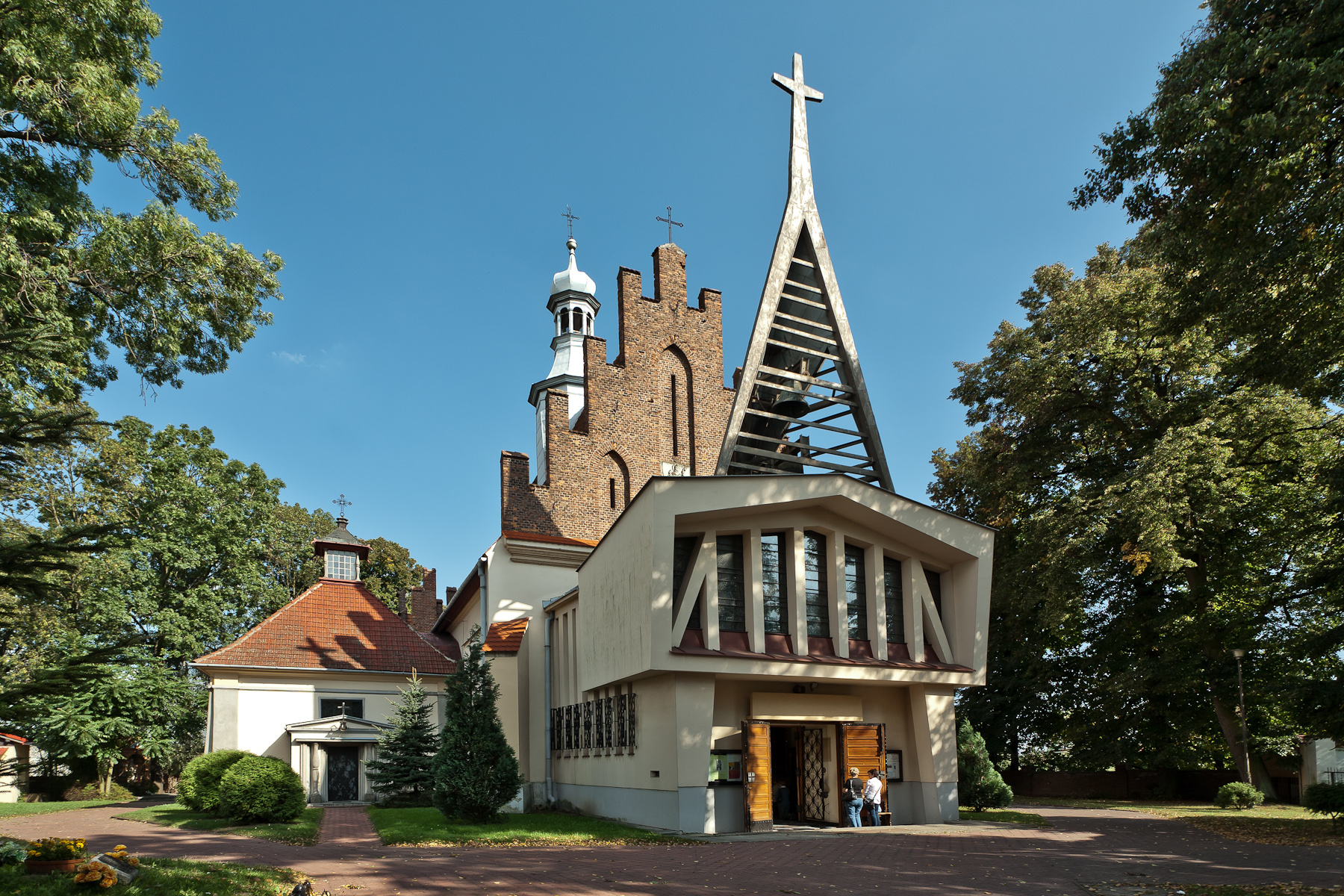
- Church of the Nativity of the Virgin Mary

- Location within Poland
- Coordinates: 50°07′N 19°55′E
- Country: Poland
- Voivodeship: Lesser Poland
- Powiat: Kraków
- Gmina: Zielonki

Government

Area
  - Total: 6.14 km^{2} (2.37 sq mi)
- Time zone: UTC+1 (CET)
  - Summer (DST): UTC+2 (CEST)
- Postal code: 32-087
- Car Plates: KRA

Zielonki [ʑɛˈlɔnki] is a village in southern Poland. It is located in the Lesser Poland Voivodeship and it is also the administrative center of the Gmina Zielonki.
