= Július Kánássy =

Czechoslovak soccer player (born 1934)

Personal information
- Date of birth: 11 March 1934 (age 92)
- Place of birth: Košice, Czechoslovakia

Senior career*
Years	Team	Apps	(Gls)
1953	Lokomotíva Košice		
1954–1956	Spartak VSS Košice		
1957–1959	Slovan Bratislava		
1959–1968	Jednota/VSS Košice		

International career
	Czechoslovakia B	2	(0)
- * Club domestic league appearances and goals

Július Kánássy (born 11 March 1934 in Košice, Czechoslovakia), original Hungarian name: Kánássy Gyula, nicknamed Šušu, Egérke or Garrincha from Košice, is a former Slovak football winger and later coach. He played for Lokomotíva Košice (1953), Spartak VSS Košice (1954–1956), Slovan Bratislava (1957–1959) and ended his career in Jednota/VSS Košice (1959–1968). Kánássy made over 300 appearances at Czechoslovak Football.

Kánássy was capped twice for the Czechoslovakia national football B team and 7 times for Czechoslovak youth squads but he never got a chance at the First team.

He acted as assistant coach at VSS Košice alongside Jozef Vengloš in the 1970–71 season when club finished second at the Czechoslovak First League.
