= Adam Michel =

Polish footballer

Personal information
- Date of birth: 27 May 1936
- Place of birth: Kraków, Poland
- Date of death: 8 January 1990 (aged 53)
- Place of death: Kraków, Poland
- Height: 1.72 m (5 ft 8 in)
- Position: Midfielder

Youth career
- Nadwiślan Kraków
- 1949–1955: Wisła Kraków

Senior career*
Years	Team	Apps	(Gls)
1955–1963	Wisła Kraków		

International career
1954–1955	Poland U19	4	(0)
1957–1958	Poland U23	4	(0)
1959–1960	Poland	3	(0)
- * Club domestic league appearances and goals

Adam Michel (27 May 1936 – 8 January 1990) was a Polish footballer who played as a midfielder. He played in three matches for the Poland national football team from 1959 to 1960.
