= Ryszard Budka =

Polish footballer (1935–2025)

Personal information
- Date of birth: 17 July 1935
- Place of birth: Czatkowice, Poland
- Date of death: 4 September 2025 (aged 90)
- Height: 1.78 m (5 ft 10 in)
- Position: Defender

Senior career*
Years	Team	Apps	(Gls)
1955–1968	Wisła Kraków	243	(2)
1968	Wisła Chicago		
- Błyskawica Chicago

International career
1962	Poland	2	(0)
- * Club domestic league appearances and goals

Ryszard Budka (17 July 1935 – 4 September 2025) was a Polish footballer who played as a defender. He played in two matches for the Poland national team in 1962. Budka died on 4 September 2025, at the age of 90.

== Honours ==
Wisła Kraków

- I liga: 1964–65
- Polish Cup: 1966–67
