= Prądnik Czerwony, Kraków (district) =

Dzielnica III Prądnik Czerwony
- Dzielnica of Kraków
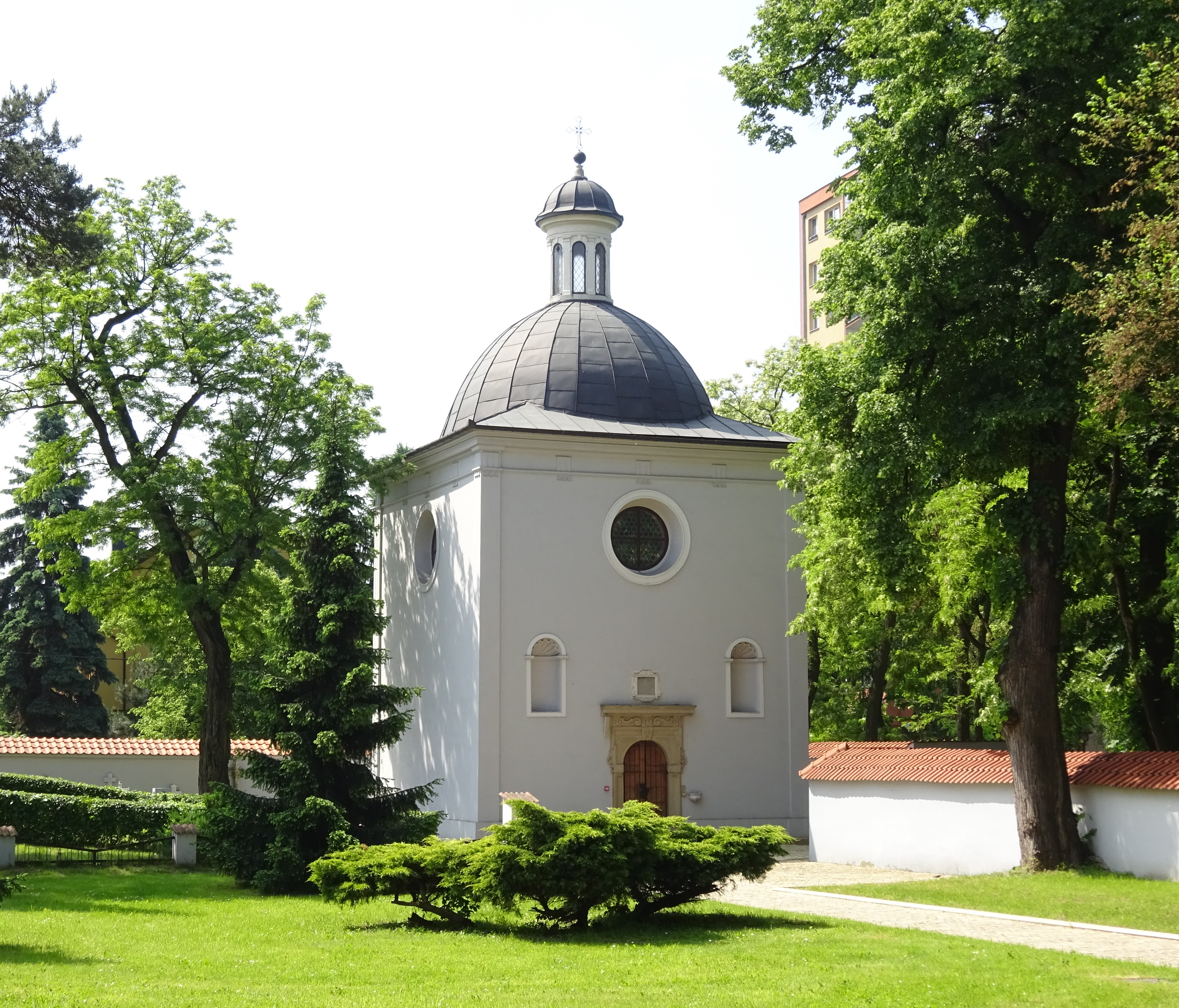
- Historic Chapel of St. John the Baptist

- District III Prądnik Czerwony on the map of Kraków after the latest subdivisions
- Coordinates: 50°4′59.63″N 19°58′7.84″E
- Country: Poland
- Voivodeship: Lesser Poland
- County/City: Kraków

Government
  - President: Aniela Dirks

Area
  - Total: 6.44 km^{2} (2.49 sq mi)

Population (2014)
  - Total: 47,775
  - Density: 7,420/km^{2} (19,200/sq mi)
- Time zone: UTC+1 (CET)
  - Summer (DST): UTC+2 (CEST)
- Area code: +48 12
- Website: http://www.dzielnica3.krakow.pl

District III Prądnik Czerwony (Polish: Dzielnica III Prądnik Czerwony) is a district of the city of Kraków, Poland, located in the northern part of the city. The name Prądnik Czerwony comes from a village of same name (first mentioned in 1105) that is now a part of the district.

According to the Central Statistical Office data, the district's area is 6.44 square kilometres (2.49 square miles) and 47 775 people inhabit Prądnik Czerwony.

== Subdivisions of Prądnik Czerwony ==
Prądnik Czerwony is divided into smaller subdivisions (osiedles). Here's a list of them.

- Olsza
- Olsza II
- Prądnik Czerwony
- Rakowice
- Śliczna
- Ugorek
- Warszawskie
- Wieczysta
- Akacjowa
