= Mistrzejowice =

- Dzielnica of Kraków
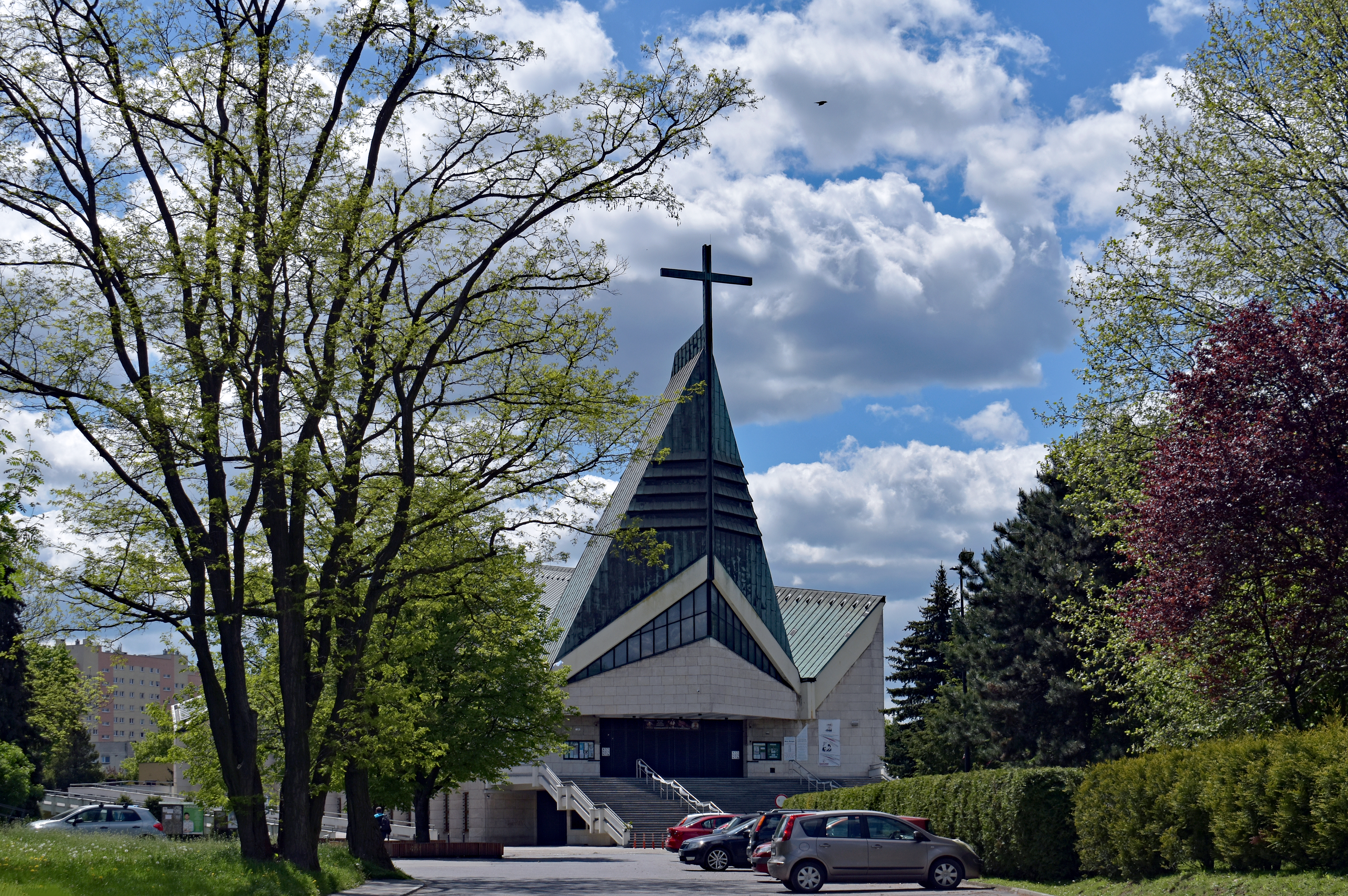
- View of Church of St. Maksymilian Kolbe

- Location of Mistrzejowice within Kraków
- Coordinates: 50°5′52″N 20°0′22″E
- Country: Poland
- Voivodeship: Lesser Poland
- County/City: Kraków

Government
  - President: Grażyna Janawa

Area
  - Total: 5.59 km^{2} (2.16 sq mi)

Population (2014)
  - Total: 53,015
  - Density: 9,480/km^{2} (24,600/sq mi)
- Time zone: UTC+1 (CET)
  - Summer (DST): UTC+2 (CEST)
- Area code: +48 12
- Website: http://www.dzielnica15.krakow.pl

Mistrzejowice is one of the 18 districts of Kraków; known as Dzielnica XV (District 15), located in the northern part of the city. The name Mistrzejowice comes from a village of same name (first mentioned in 1270) that is now a part of the district.

According to the Central Statistical Office data, the district's area is 5.59 square kilometres (2.16 square miles) and 53 015 people inhabit Mistrzejowice.

== Subdivisions of Mistrzejowice ==
Mistrzejowice is divided into smaller subdivisions (osiedles). Here's a list of them.

- Batowice
- Dziekanowice
- Mistrzejowice
- Osiedle Bohaterów Września
- Osiedle Kombatantów
- Osiedle Mistrzejowice Nowe
- Osiedle Oświecenia
- Osiedle Piastów
- Osiedle Srebrnych Orłów
- Osiedle Tysiąclecia
- Osiedle Złotego Wieku
