= Prądnik Biały, Kraków (district) =

Dzielnica IV Prądnik Biały
- Dzielnica of Kraków
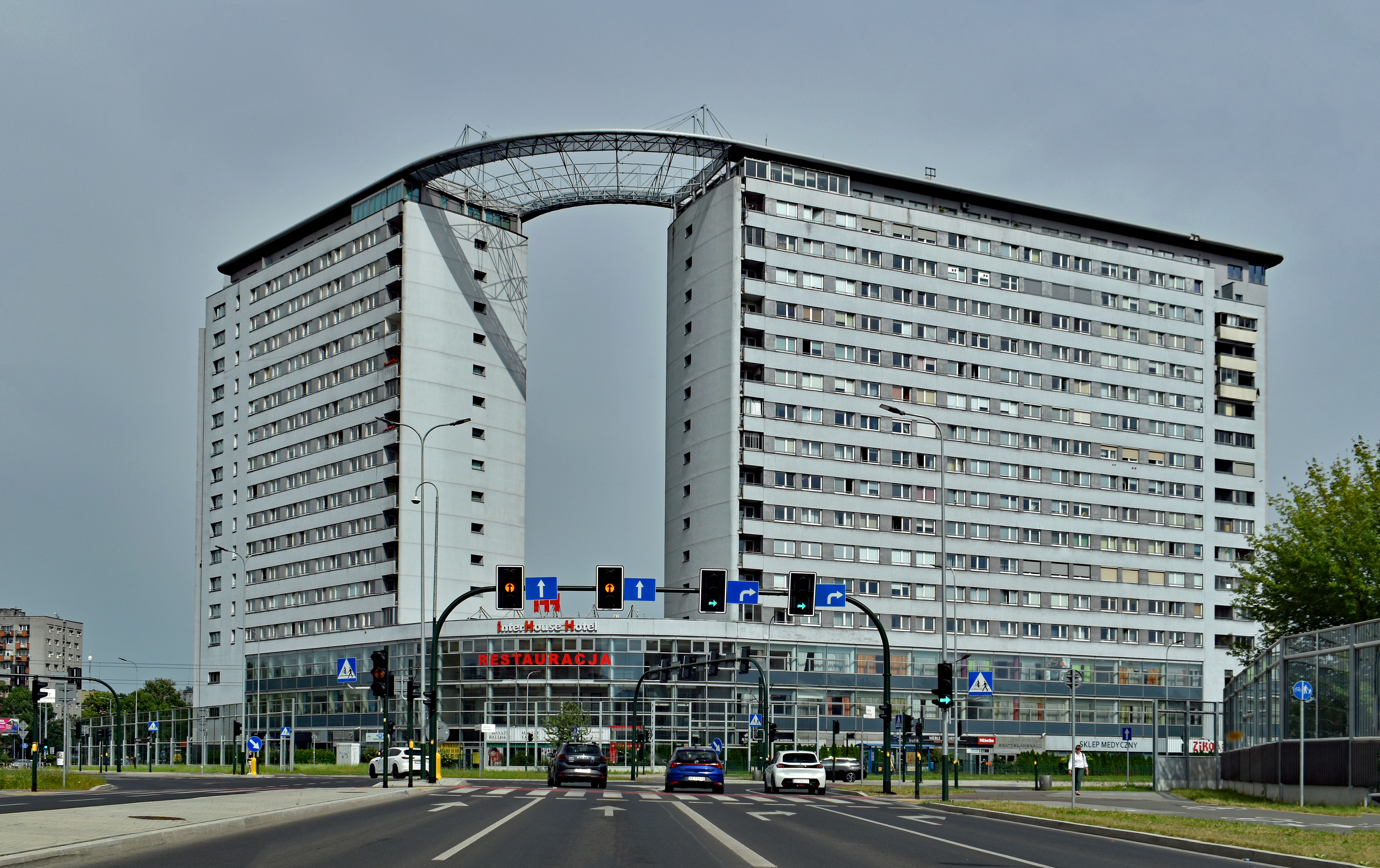

- District IV Prądnik Biały on the map of Kraków after the latest subdivisions
- Coordinates: 50°5′57.26″N 19°54′22.69″E
- Country: Poland
- Voivodeship: Lesser Poland
- County/City: Kraków

Government
  - President: Jakub Kosek

Area
  - Total: 23.42 km^{2} (9.04 sq mi)

Population (2014)
  - Total: 69,135
  - Density: 2,952/km^{2} (7,646/sq mi)
- Time zone: UTC+1 (CET)
  - Summer (DST): UTC+2 (CEST)
- Area code: +48 12
- Website: www.dzielnica4.krakow.pl

District IV Prądnik Biały (Polish: Dzielnica IV Prądnik Biały) is a district of the city of Kraków, Poland, located in the northwest part of the city. The name Prądnik Biały comes from a village of the same name that is now a part of the district.

According to the Central Statistical Office data, the district's area is 23.42 square kilometres (9.04 square miles) and 69 135 people inhabit Prądnik Biały.

== Subdivisions of Prądnik Biały ==
Prądnik Czerwony is divided into smaller subdivisions (osiedles). Here's a list of them.

- Azory
- Bronowice Wielkie
- Osiedle Gotyk
- Górka Narodowa
- Górka Narodowa Wschód
- Górka Narodowa Zachód
- Osiedle Krowodrza Górka
- Osiedle Witkowice Nowe
- Prądnik Biały
- Tonie
- Witkowice
- Żabiniec
