= 1921 Hungary v Poland football match =

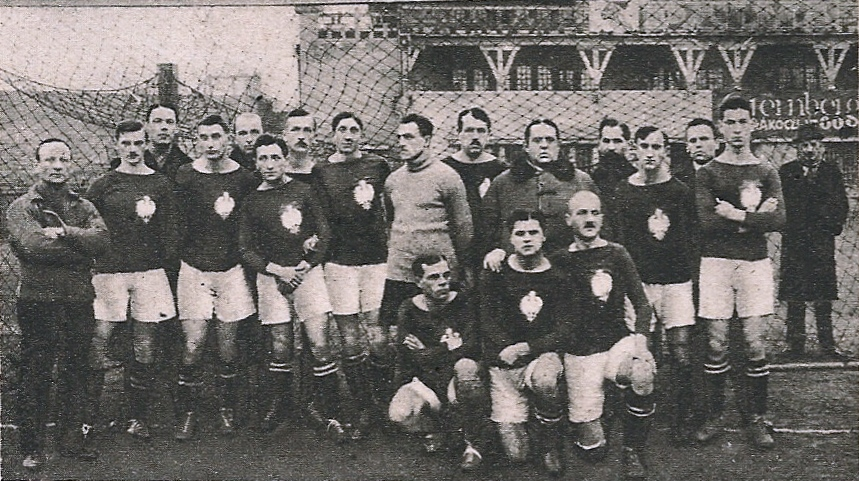
- Polish football national team before the match
- Event: Friendly
Hungary	Poland
1	0
- Date: 18 December 1921
- Venue: Hungária körúti stadion, Budapest
- Referee: Karl Grätz (Czechoslovakia)
- Attendance: 8,000

The 1921 football game between Hungary and Poland was a friendly match played on 18 December 1921, of historical importance in Poland, as it was the first international match in the history of the Poland national football team. Even though Hungary won the match 1–0, the game helped Poland establish its national football team following its reestablishment as a sovereign nation following World War I.

== Historic background ==
Once an ancient kingdom, from the years 1772 to 1795, Poland was partitioned by its three powerful neighbours—Russia, Austria, and Prussia. As the result of the partitions, Poland disappeared from the map of Europe for 123 years. Despite several insurrections, the Poles did not manage to win back their independence throughout the 19th century. In the fall of 1918, when World War I came to an end, several Central European nations, including Poland, regained independence.

The newly reestablished country quickly started to organize not only its political administration, but also its sports organisations. Envoys of several football clubs, which had previously existed under either Prussian, Russian, or Austrian rule, met in Warsaw on 20 and 21 December 1919, thus establishing the Polish Football Association.

In the years 1919 and 1920, Poland fought several wars with its neighbours, including the Polish-Soviet War, the Polish-Ukrainian War, the Polish-Lithuanian War, the Great Poland Uprising, Silesian Uprisings, as well as border conflicts between Poland and Czechoslovakia. Under the circumstances, no soccer games took place. Only when these conflicts were over, starting in spring of 1921, did the first games for the Championships of Poland take place, with the Cracovia club winning the first title.

== Search for international opponents ==
To establish itself among other European football federations, Polish officials started to look for a potential opponent for a friendly international game. This was not easy as relations with almost all neighbours were strained due to the recent conflicts. Also, as the Poland national team had never before appeared as such on the field, other nations were simply not interested in playing with an unknown opponent.

Polish officials asked the Austrians whether they would be interested in a friendly international match, but never received a response. They were considering playing either France or Sweden, but in 1921 the Hungarians came forward with an offer, asking whether Poland would like to face their national team around Christmas of 1921. This was happily accepted by the Poles, as Hungary was regarded as a strong team. Some speculate that the then-Polish coach, Imre Pozsonyi from Hungary, used his influence to convince his fellow countrymen to get in touch with the Poles. Some searches even claimed that due to the long time friendship between two countries, the Hungarian team accepted to play with Poland.

== Preparing for the game ==
In November 1921, Polish officials and Coach Pozsonyi chose 22 players who became the members of the first Poland National Football Team. These players took part in a few warm-up games in Kraków, and after a few weeks, 13 players were chosen. These athletes, who in most cases did not know each other, boarded the train on 16 December, and after a 36-hour journey in 3rd class cars, reached Budapest.

This is the list of Polish players who came to Budapest and the clubs they represented:

- Jan Loth - goalkeeper (Polonia Warszawa)
- Ludwik Gintel - defender (Cracovia)
- Artur Marczewski - defender (Polonia Warszawa)
- Zdzisław Styczeń - midfielder (Cracovia)
- Stanisław Cikowski - midfielder (Cracovia)
- Tadeusz Synowiec - midfielder (Cracovia)
- Stanisław Mielech - forward (Cracovia)
- Wacław Kuchar - forward (Pogoń Lwów)
- Józef Kałuża - forward (Cracovia)
- Marian Einbacher - forward (Warta Poznań)
- Leon Sperling - forward (Cracovia)

In reserve there were two additional footballers:

- Stefan Loth - (Polonia Warszawa)
- Mieczysław Batsch - (Pogoń Lwów)

Apart from players there were some officials in the party: coach Imre Pozsonyi, president of PZPN dr. Edward Cetnarowski, PZPN's prof. Jan Weyssenhof as well as several journalists.

== The game ==
The game took place on 18 December 1921, at the Hungaria Stadium in Budapest. For the Hungarians, this was just another friendly game. Since 1902, their national team had already played about 80 international matches, so the hosts did not treat this match in a special way. For the Poles however, it was a historic 90 minutes; for the first time ever, 11 players were to appear on the field dressed in jerseys emblazoned with the white eagle of Poland.

The audience turnout was not impressive. Only around 8,000 spectators showed up, which was a disappointment; at previous games there usually were up to 30,000 supporters. This may have been due to the weather, as the ground was slushy. As a result of the weather, the turf was wet and muddy, which proved to be an advantage for the Poles. The Hungarians, regarded as first-quality dribblers, were unable to play their fast, energetic style.

In the 18th minute, Jenő Szabó of Hungary scored what would be the only goal of the game. The Hungarians had another chance to score in the 41st minute, but Karoly Fogl’s penalty kick missed the goal. From what can be gathered, the home team should have scored more goals than one, but Poland's goal keeper played an extraordinary game.

The final blow of the referee, the Czechoslovak Karl Grätz, was welcomed with relief by both sides. The Hungarians were happy because they had won, while the Poles were pleased because the defeat to a renowned opponent was not as severe as some had predicted, and the match had helped to establish them on the international football scene.

== See also ==
- History of football in Poland
- Poland national football team
- 1939 Poland v Hungary football match
- Polish football in the interwar period
