= Bojarski =

Bojarski (Polish pronunciation: [bɔˈjarski]; feminine: Bojarska; plural: Bojarscy) is a Polish-language surname.

Corresponding surnames
Language	Masculine	Feminine
Polish	Bojarski	Bojarska
Belarusian (Romanization)	Баярскі (Bajarski, Bayarski, Baiarski)	Баярская (Bajarskaja, Bayarskaya, Baiarskaia)
Russian (Romanization)	Боярский (Boyarsky, Boyarskiy, Boiarsky, Bojarskij)	Боярская (Boyarskaya, Boiarskaia, Bojarskaja)
Ukrainian (Romanization)	Боярський (Boyarskyi, Boyarskyy, Boiarskyi, Bojarskyj)	Боярська (Boyarska, Boiarska, Bojarska)

== People ==
- Barbara Bojarska, Polish historian, author and scientist
- Ceslaw Bojarski (1912–2003), French counterfeiter
- Janusz Bojarski (born 1956), officer of the Polish Armed Forces
- Marcin Bojarski (born 1977), Polish writer
- Wacław Bojarski (1921–1944), Polish poet
- Roxanne Bojarski, fictional character on American Dreams
