= Paweł Holc =

Polish footballer

Personal information
- Date of birth: 21 June 1971 (age 55)
- Place of birth: Lublin, Poland
- Height: 1.80 m (5 ft 11 in)
- Position: Midfielder

Senior career*
Years	Team	Apps	(Gls)
1988–1989	Budowlani Lublin		
1989–1991	Górnik Łęczna		
1991–1994	Lublinianka		
1994	Motor Lublin		
1995–1998	Stal Stalowa Wola		
1998–2002	Stomil Olsztyn	92	(14)
2002	Górnik Łęczna		
2002–2003	Wisła Płock	18	(0)
2004	DKS Dobre Miasto		
2005–2007	Asker		
- * Club domestic league appearances and goals

Paweł Holc (born 21 June 1971) is a Polish former professional footballer who played as a midfielder.

== Career ==
Holc was born in Lublin. His career started while he was still a youngster in 1989 for Górnik Łęczna before he moved to Lublinianka in 1991. He then joined Motor Lublin for a short stint in 1994, before signing with Stal Stalowa Wola in 1995.

Holc made his league debut on 4 March 1995. He moved to top-tier team Stomil Olsztyn. He played professional football for sixteen years. He had to overcome great personal tragedy, including the death of his wife.

Holc went to Wisła Płock for the 2002–03 season before beginning to train players in the 2003–04 season. He later played in Norway.
