= Kabel Kraków =

Football club in Kraków

KS Kabel Kraków
- Full name: Klub Sportowy Kabel Kraków
- Short name: Kabel Kraków
- Founded: 1929; 97 years ago
- Dissolved: 2000 (reformed in 2018)
- Ground: Parkowa, Podgórze, Kraków
- League: Liga okręgowa
- 2025/6: 1st of 14
- Website: kskabel.pl
Home colours colors	Away colours colors

Kabel Kraków is a football club based in Kraków, Lesser Poland, Poland. As of the 2026–27 season, they compete in the IV liga (Lesser Poland - West), after winning the liga okręgowa the previous year.

== History ==
=== Foundation ===
Kabel Kraków was founded in 1929 as the works club of a cable factory in Płaszów. By the late 1930's the team was pushing for promotion from the third tier of the league system.

=== Reactivation ===
Following World War II, the team was reactivated in 1946 and re-entered the league the following year. In 1949 the club merged with Wolania Wola Duchacka and was renamed Stal Wola Duchacka. However, by 1957 the club had returned to its original name.

In 2000 Kabel Kraków was taken over by Tele-Fonika. The club was evicted from their ground, forcing them to resign from the IV liga mid-season. The club was liquidated in 2001.

=== Refoundation ===
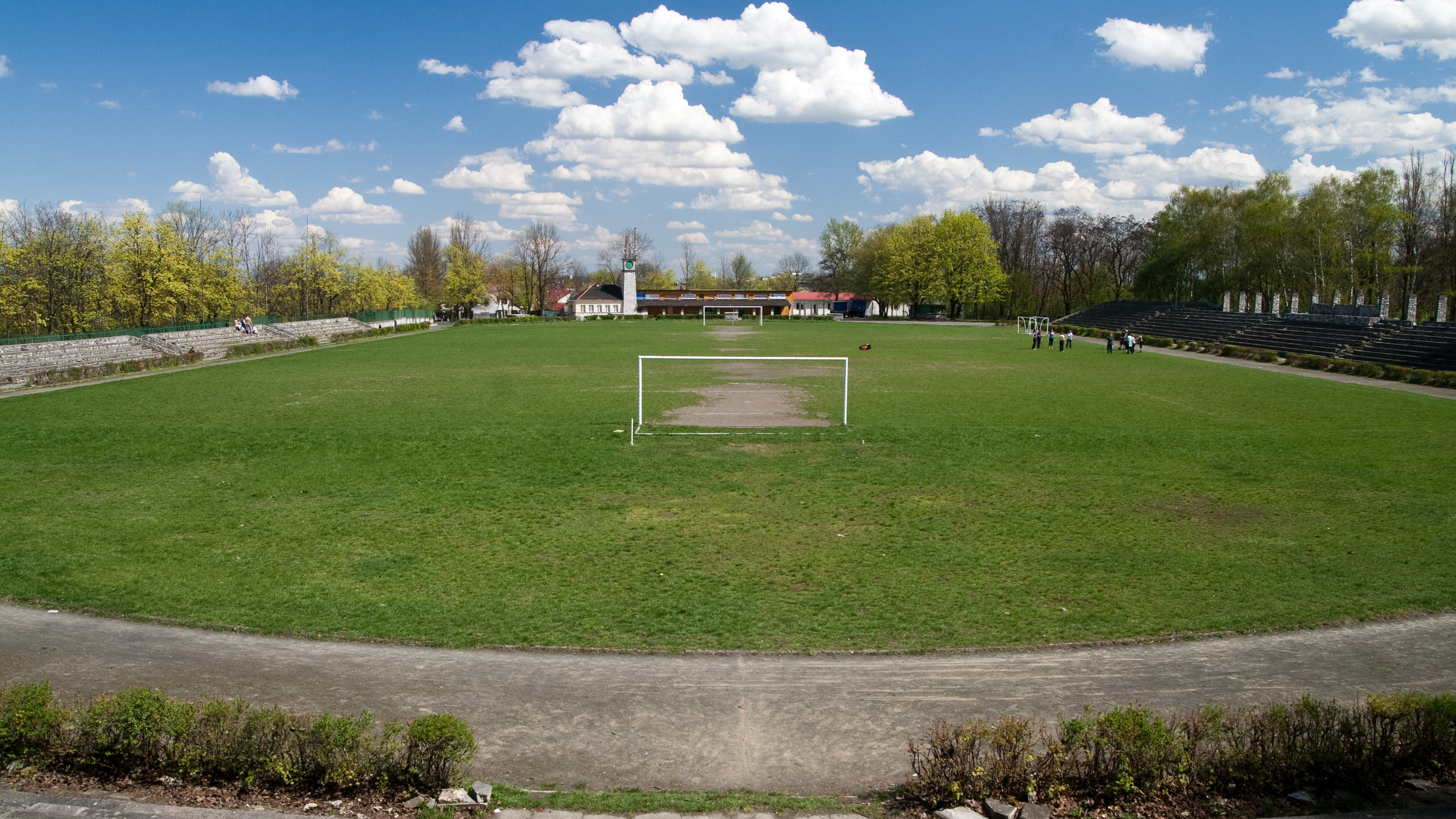
The current stadium of Kabel Kraków

In 2018 Kabel Kraków was refounded, and by 2022 had been promoted out of Klasa A into the regional Liga okręgowa. The refounded club were unable to return to their original stadium, which had been taken over by Cracovia as their training ground. Instead Kabel Kraków found a new home at the former stadium of another defunct club named Korona Kraków in the Krzemionki area of Podgórze.

== Notable players ==
Notable former players for Kabel Kraków include Piotr Bania, Piotr Giza, Andrzej Rewilak, and Mirosław Spiżak.
