= Edward Jabłoński =

Polish footballer

Personal information
- Full name: Edward Leon Jabłoński
- Date of birth: 13 October 1919
- Place of birth: Kraków, Austria-Hungary
- Date of death: 17 November 1970 (aged 51)
- Place of death: Kraków, Poland
- Height: 1.77 m (5 ft 10 in)
- Position: Midfielder

Senior career*
Years	Team	Apps	(Gls)
1931–1938	Nadwiślan Kraków		
1938–1950	Cracovia		
1951–1955	Start-Oldboye		

International career
1939–1947	Poland	3	(1)

Managerial career
- Korona Kraków
- Włókniarz Trzebinia
- Hutnik Trzebinia
- Prądniczanka Kraków
- Lublinianka
- 1958: Cracovia
- * Club domestic league appearances and goals

Edward Leon Jabłoński (13 October 1919 – 17 November 1970) was a Polish professional footballer who played as a midfielder. He played for Cracovia and the Poland national team.

== Biography ==
Born on 13 October 1919 in Kraków, Jabłoński was one of the few players who participated in games of the national team both before and after World War II. He died on 17 November 1970, also in Kraków.

Jabłoński played as a right midfield for Cracovia in the seasons 1938–39 and, after the war, in 1948–1950. In 1948, when Cracovia became the champion of Poland, he was the captain of the team.

Altogether, he took part in three international friendlies, scoring one goal, Poland's first since the end of the war. He made his debut on 27 August 1939 in Warsaw in a 4–2 win over Hungary. During the war, he did not play officially, as the German occupiers banned Poles from practising any kind of sports. His last game with the national team took place on 19 July 1947 in Warsaw, a 1–2 loss to Romania.

== Honours ==
Cracovia

- Ekstraklasa: 1948

== See also ==
- The last game: 27 August 1939, Poland – Hungary 4–2
