= Stefan Popiel =

Polish footballer

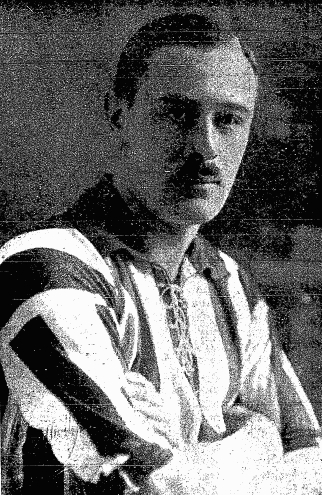

Personal information
- Full name: Stefan Ignacy Dominik Popiel
- Date of birth: 19 May 1896
- Place of birth: Skawina, Poland
- Date of death: 22 December 1927 (aged 31)
- Place of death: Mała, Poland
- Height: 1.78 m (5 ft 10 in)
- Position: Goalkeeper

Youth career
- 1909–1913: Cracovia
1919	Wisła Kraków		

International career
Years	Team	Apps	(Gls)
1922–1923	Poland	2	(0)

Stefan Ignacy Dominik Popiel (19 May 1896 – 22 December 1927) was a Polish footballer and soldier. He played in two matches for the Poland national football team in 1922 and 1923.

== Honours ==
Cracovia

- Ekstraklasa: 1921
