= 1921 in Polish football =

Football in Poland
- Season: 1921

- Poland national team
- Friendly

The 1921 season was the 2nd season of competitive football in Poland.

== National teams ==
=== Poland national team ===
18 December 1921 Friendly	Hungary	1–0	Poland	Hungária körúti stadion, Budapest
13:50 CET (UTC+1)	Szabó 18'	Report		Attendance: 8,000; Referee: Karl Grätz (Czechoslovakia)
