= Henryk Stroniarz =

Polish football player and manager (1936–2026)

Personal information
- Full name: Henryk Ryszard Stroniarz
- Date of birth: 20 March 1936
- Place of birth: Kraków, Poland
- Date of death: 11 March 2026 (aged 89)
- Place of death: Kraków, Poland
- Height: 1.74 m (5 ft 9 in)
- Position: Goalkeeper

Senior career*
Years	Team	Apps	(Gls)
1949–1950	Korona Kraków		
1951–1956	Garbarnia Kraków		
1957–1958	Legia Warsaw		
1959–1960	Garbarnia Kraków		
1961–1963	Cracovia		
1964–1971	Wisła Kraków		
1972	White Eagles		
1972	Royal Wawel Chicago		
1973	Tarnovia Tarnów		

International career
1965	Poland	1	(0)

Managerial career
- 1974–1975: Wisła Kraków
- 1978–1979: Royal Wawel Chicago
- 1980–1983: Cracovia
- 1983–1984: Stal Mielec
- 1984–1985: Cracovia
- * Club domestic league appearances and goals

Henryk Ryszard Stroniarz (20 March 1936 – 11 March 2026) was a Polish football manager and player who played as a goalkeeper.

He made one appearance for the Poland national team in 1965.

Stroniarz died in Kraków on 11 March 2026, at the age of 89. His brother Zbigniew Stroniarz was also a footballer.

== Honours ==
=== Player ===
Wisła Kraków

- II liga: 1964–65
- Polish Cup: 1966–67

=== Manager ===
Cracovia

- II liga, group II: 1981–82
