= Stefan Fryc =

Polish footballer

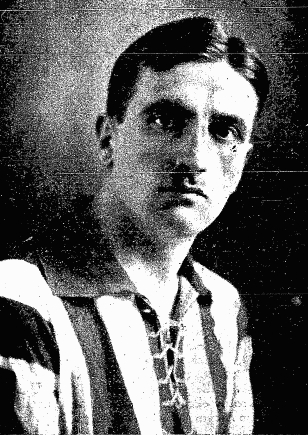
- Stefan Fryc in 1922

Personal information
- Date of birth: 10 August 1894
- Place of birth: Nowa Wieś Szlachecka, Austria-Hungary
- Date of death: 9 November 1943 (aged 49)
- Place of death: Warsaw, Poland
- Height: 1.78 m (5 ft 10 in)
- Position: Defender

Senior career*
Years	Team	Apps	(Gls)
1910–1926	Cracovia		
1927	Legia Kraków		

International career
1913	Galicia	1	(0)
1922–1924	Poland	8	(0)
- * Club domestic league appearances and goals

Stefan Fryc (10 August 1894 – 9 November 1943) was a Polish footballer who played as a defender. He competed in the men's tournament at the 1924 Summer Olympics.

He took part in the Polish Defensive War of 1939 with the rank of artillery reserve lieutenant. He was interned in Hungary. In 1943, he returned to the country and settled in Warsaw. In November that year, he was arrested and murdered by the SS in a mass execution held in the Warsaw Ghetto. Claims have been made that he died in the Warsaw Uprising instead.

== Honours ==
Cracovia

- Ekstraklasa: 1921
