= Władysław Gędłek =

Polish footballer

Personal information
- Date of birth: 15 June 1920
- Place of birth: Kraków, Poland
- Date of death: 28 September 1954 (aged 34)
- Place of death: Kraków, Poland
- Height: 1.78 m (5 ft 10 in)
- Position: Right-back

Senior career*
Years	Team	Apps	(Gls)
1935–1939	Krowodrza Kraków		
1945–1954	Cracovia		

International career
1949–1953	Poland	20	(0)
- * Club domestic league appearances and goals

Władysław Gędłek (15 June 1920 – 28 February 1954) was a Polish footballer who played as a right-back. He represented both Cracovia and the Poland national team.

== Club career ==
His first team was Krowodrza Kraków, where Gędłek started his career in 1935. During World War II, he participated in secret games in Kraków, as the German occupiers banned Poles from playing all sports. In 1945, he moved to Cracovia, where he played until 1953, winning the championship in 1948.

Gędłek was regarded as a very talented and skilled player. Tough in defence, active in offence, often initiated dangerous attacks on opponents. In late 1940s Poland, Gędłek had the status of a celebrity, and his immense talent was appreciated not only in his native country. As the first Pole ever, he was called to the FIFA's official "World Team’’, to a friendly game in 1953.

== International career ==
Gędłek won 20 caps for the Poland national team from 1949 to 1953, and represented Poland at the 1952 Summer Olympics, appearing in both games played by his team.

== Honours ==
- Ekstraklasa: 1948
