= Zbigniew Stroniarz =

Polish footballer (1943–2017)

Personal information
- Date of birth: September 21, 1943
- Place of birth: Kraków, Poland
- Date of death: August 31, 2017 (aged 73)
- Place of death: Poland
- Position: Forward

Youth career
- 1953–1960: Garbarnia Kraków

Senior career*
| Years | Team | Apps | (Gls) |
| 1960–1962 | SHL Kielce | | |
| 1962–1964 | Cracovia | 32 | (13) |
| 1964 | Legia Warsaw | 1 | (0) |
| 1965–1967 | Lublinianka | | |
| 1967–1971 | Cracovia | 61 | (18) |
| 1974 | Toronto Polonia | | |
- * Club domestic league appearances and goals

Zbigniew Stroniarz (21 September 1943 – 31 August 2017) was a Polish footballer who played as a forward.

== Career ==
Stroniarz played at the youth level with Garbarnia Kraków from 1952 till 1960. In 1960, he played with SHL Kielce for three seasons, and played in the II liga with Cracovia in 1962. In 1964, he played in the Ekstraklasa with league rivals Legia Warsaw. He made his debut for Legia on 16 August 1964, against Zagłębie Sosnowiec.

The following season he played in the Liga okręgowa with Lublinianka, and returned to Cracovia in 1967. Throughout his second stint with Cracovia he played in the Ekstraklasa, and II liga. In 1974, he played abroad in the Canadian National Soccer League with Toronto Polonia.

== Personal life ==
His brother Henryk Stroniarz was also a footballer.
