= Mirosław Spiżak =

Polish footballer

Personal information
- Date of birth: 13 January 1979 (age 47)
- Place of birth: Kraków, Poland
- Height: 1.86 m (6 ft 1 in)
- Position: Striker

Youth career
- 1985–1989: Kabel Kraków
- 1989–1996: Wisła Kraków

Senior career*
Years	Team	Apps	(Gls)
1997–1999	KFC Uerdingen 05	51	(8)
1999–2000	Bayer Leverkusen	0	(0)
2000–2002	SpVgg Unterhaching	31	(7)
2002–2003	Alemannia Aachen	33	(5)
2003–2005	MSV Duisburg	46	(3)
2005–2006	Sportfreunde Siegen	29	(3)
2006–2008	SpVgg Unterhaching	31	(2)
2008	→ SV Elversberg (loan)	14	(1)
2009	Würzburger Kickers	14	(9)
2010	Würzburger Kickers		

International career
1999–2000	Poland U21	9	(0)
- * Club domestic league appearances and goals

Mirosław Spiżak (born 13 January 1979) is a Polish former professional footballer who played as striker.
