= Krzysztof Hausner =

Polish footballer (1944–2004)

Personal information
- Full name: Krzysztof Józef Hausner
- Date of birth: 13 March 1944
- Place of birth: Kraków, Poland
- Date of death: 26 January 2004 (aged 59)
- Place of death: Kraków, Poland
- Height: 1.72 m (5 ft 8 in)
- Position: Right winger

Youth career
- 1952–1960: Nadwiślan Kraków

Senior career*
| Years | Team | Apps | (Gls) |
| 1960–1961 | Unia Tarnów | | |
| 1961–1967 | Cracovia | 170 | (52) |
| 1961 | → Górnik Zabrze (loan) | | |
| 1967 | Zagłębie Sosnowiec | | |
| 1968–1970 | Wisła Kraków | | |
| 1970–1973 | Kalwarianka Kalwaria Zebrz. | | |
| 1973–1976 | Błyskawica Chicago | | |

International career
- Poland U18
| 1967 | Poland | 1 | (0) |
Medal record
Men's football
Representing Poland
UEFA European Under-18 Championship
| Runner-up | 1961 Portugal |
- * Club domestic league appearances and goals

Krzysztof Józef Hausner (13 March 1944 – 26 January 2004) was a Polish footballer who played as a right winger, most notable for his performances for Cracovia. Hausner also capped once for the Poland national team, in a goalless draw against Luxembourg on 16 April 1967.

As a member of the junior team of Poland, Hausner won silver at the 1961 UEFA European Under-18 Championship. In 1962, after a brief period in Unia Tarnow, he was purchased by Cracovia and remained there until 1967. Then, he shortly played for Zagłębie Sosnowiec, Wisła Kraków and Kalwarianka Kalwaria Zebrzydowska. After finishing his professional career, Hausner left Poland for Chicago, where he occasionally played for local Polonia teams and worked as a coach.

== Honours ==
Poland U18

- UEFA European Under-18 Championship runner-up: 1961
