= Stanisław Cikowski =

Polish footballer

Personal information
- Full name: Stanisław Kazimierz Cikowski
- Date of birth: 14 February 1899
- Place of birth: Czarny Dunajec, Austria-Hungary
- Date of death: 2 December 1959 (aged 60)
- Place of death: Kraków, Poland
- Height: 1.70 m (5 ft 7 in)
- Position: Midfielder

Senior career*
| Years | Team | Apps | (Gls) |
| 1912–1925 | Cracovia | | |

International career
| 1921–1924 | Poland | 9 | (0) |
- * Club domestic league appearances and goals

Stanisław Kazimierz Cikowski (14 February 1899 – 2 December 1959) was a Polish footballer who played as a midfielder.

He competed in the men's tournament at the 1924 Summer Olympics.

== Honours ==
Cracovia

- Polish Football Championship: 1921
