= Andrzej Rewilak =

Polish footballer

Personal information
- Date of birth: 4 September 1942 (age 84)
- Place of birth: Kraków, Poland
- Position: Defender

Senior career*
Years	Team	Apps	(Gls)
–1959	Kabel Kraków		
1959–1960	Wawel Kraków		
1960–1971	Cracovia		

International career
- Poland U18
1966	Poland	1	(0)
Medal record
Men's football
Representing Poland
UEFA European Under-18 Championship
Runner-up	1961 Portugal
- * Club domestic league appearances and goals

Andrzej Rewilak (born 4 September 1942) is a Polish former footballer who played as a defender. He played for Cracovia from 1960 to 1971.

He was capped for Poland only once. This was in 1966 when he played against England in a 1–1 draw.

== Honours ==
Poland U18

- UEFA European Under-18 Championship runner-up: 1961
