= Zdzisław Styczeń =

Polish footballer

Personal information
- Full name: Zdzisław Witold Styczeń
- Date of birth: 16 October 1894
- Place of birth: Przemyśl, Kingdom of Galicia and Lodomeria
- Date of death: 20 December 1978 (aged 84)
- Place of death: Kraków, Poland
- Height: 1.68 m (5 ft 6 in)
- Position: Midfielder

Senior career*
Years	Team	Apps	(Gls)
1909–1911	Robotniczy KS Kraków		
1911–1923	Cracovia		
1924–1926	Wisła Kraków		

International career
1921–1924	Poland	5	(0)
- * Club domestic league appearances and goals

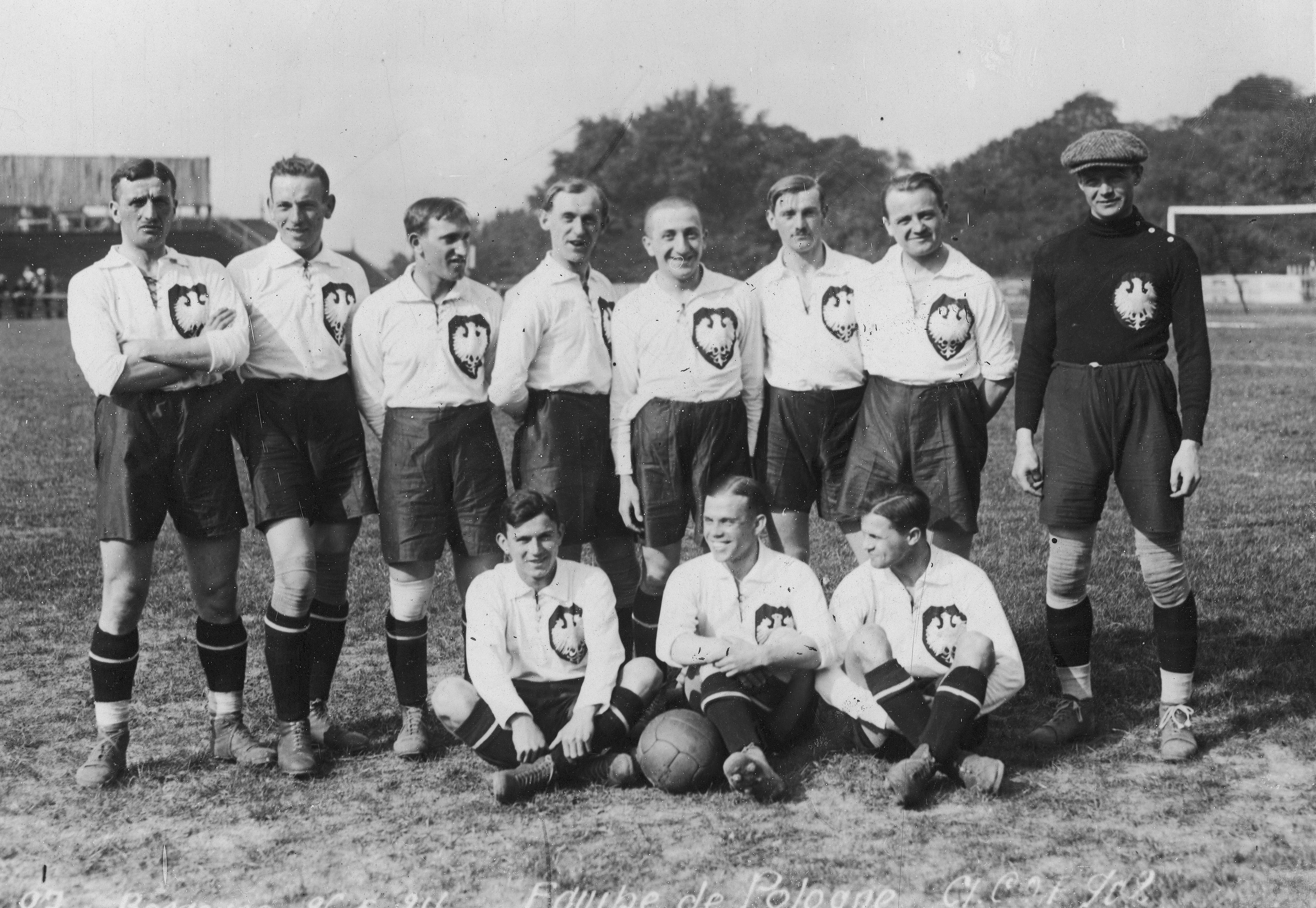
Poland national football team before match against Hungary during Olympic Games (26 May 1924, Paris).

Zdzisław Witold Styczeń (16 October 1894 – 20 December 1978) was a Polish footballer who played as a midfielder for Kraków-based clubs, Robotniczy KS, Cracovia and Wisła.

He played in the first game of the Poland national team. Styczeń was also a part of the squad that participated in the 1924 Summer Olympics.

== Honours ==
Cracovia

- Ekstraklasa: 1921
