= Wojciech Stawowy =

Polish football manager and former player

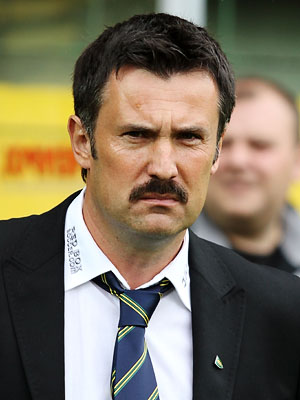
- Stawowy in 2010

Personal information
- Date of birth: 28 January 1966 (age 60)
- Place of birth: Kraków, Poland

Youth career
- 1974–1982: Cracovia

Senior career*
Years	Team	Apps	(Gls)
- Nadwiślan Kraków
- Hutnik Kraków
- Nadwiślan Kraków

Managerial career
- 1999–2002: Proszowianka Proszowice
- 2002–2006: Cracovia
- 2006–2008: Arka Gdynia
- 2008–2009: Górnik Łęczna
- 2010–2011: GKS Katowice
- 2012–2014: Cracovia
- 2014: Miedź Legnica
- 2014–2015: Widzew Łódź
- 2020–2021: ŁKS Łódź
- * Club domestic league appearances and goals

Wojciech Stawowy (born 28 January 1966) is a Polish professional football manager and former player. From 2020 to 2021, he served as the manager of ŁKS Łódź.

== Honours ==
=== Manager ===
Cracovia

- III liga, group IV: 2002–03
