= Tadeusz Parpan =

Polish footballer

Personal information
- Full name: Tadeusz Piotr Parpan
- Date of birth: 16 November 1919
- Place of birth: Kraków, Poland
- Date of death: 21 April 1990 (aged 70)
- Place of death: Kraków, Poland
- Height: 1.86 m (6 ft 1 in)
- Positions: Defender; midfielder

Senior career*
Years	Team	Apps	(Gls)
1941–1944	Łagiewianka Łagiewniki		
1945–1950	Cracovia		
1950	Legia Warsaw		
1951–1952	Włókniarz Kraków		
1952–1955	Start-Oldboye		

International career
1947–1950	Poland	20	(1)

Managerial career
- 1954: Ogniwo/Sparta Kraków
- * Club domestic league appearances and goals

Tadeusz Piotr Parpan (16 November 1919 – 21 April 1990) was a Polish footballer. He was a graduate of the Kraków Technical University (Politechnika Krakowska).

Parpan represented Cracovia (1945–1950), Garbarnia Kraków (1951–52) and the Poland national team, he played in midfield, later - as a defender. With Cracovia, he won the championship in 1948, and made 20 appearances for his national side, most of them as the captain. During Second World War was a member of the Armia Krajowa (Polish Home Army). After finishing career, he worked as a coach and a teacher at Politechnika Krakowska. Up to this day, Parpan is a well-remembered symbol of Cracovia's greatness.

== Honours ==
Cracovia

- Ekstraklasa: 1948
