= Aleksander Kahane =

Polish footballer

Personal information
- Date of birth: 30 May 1906
- Place of birth: Łódź, Russian Empire
- Date of death: c. 1969
- Place of death: Israel
- Height: 1.70 m (5 ft 7 in)
- Position: Midfielder

Senior career*
Years	Team	Apps	(Gls)
1923–1926	Klub Turystów Łódź		
1927	Cracovia		
1927–1929	Klub Turystów Łódź		
1930	Legia Warsaw	3	(0)
1931	Polonia Warsaw		
1931–1936	Hakoah Łódź		

International career
1926–1927	Poland	3	(0)
- * Club domestic league appearances and goals

Aleksander Kahane (30 May 1906 – c. 1969) was a Polish footballer who played as a midfielder. He played in three matches for the Poland national team from 1926 to 1927.
