= 1921 Polish Football Championship =

2nd season of top-tier football league in Poland

Polish Football Championship
- Season: 1921
- Dates: 21 August 1921 – 30 October 1921
- Champions: Cracovia (1st title)
- Matches: 20
- Goals: 84 (4.2 per match)
- Top goalscorer: Józef Kałuża (9 goals)
- Biggest home win: Pogoń 7–0 Warta (16 October 1921)
- Biggest away win: ŁKS 1–6 Polonia (23 October 1921)
- Highest scoring: Cracovia 7–1 ŁKS (28 August 1921)
- Longest winning run: 4 matches Cracovia
- Longest unbeaten run: 8 matches Cracovia
- Longest winless run: 8 matches ŁKS Łódź
- Longest losing run: 5 matches ŁKS Łódź
- Highest attendance: 10,000; Cracovia 2–0 Pogoń (21 August 1921)

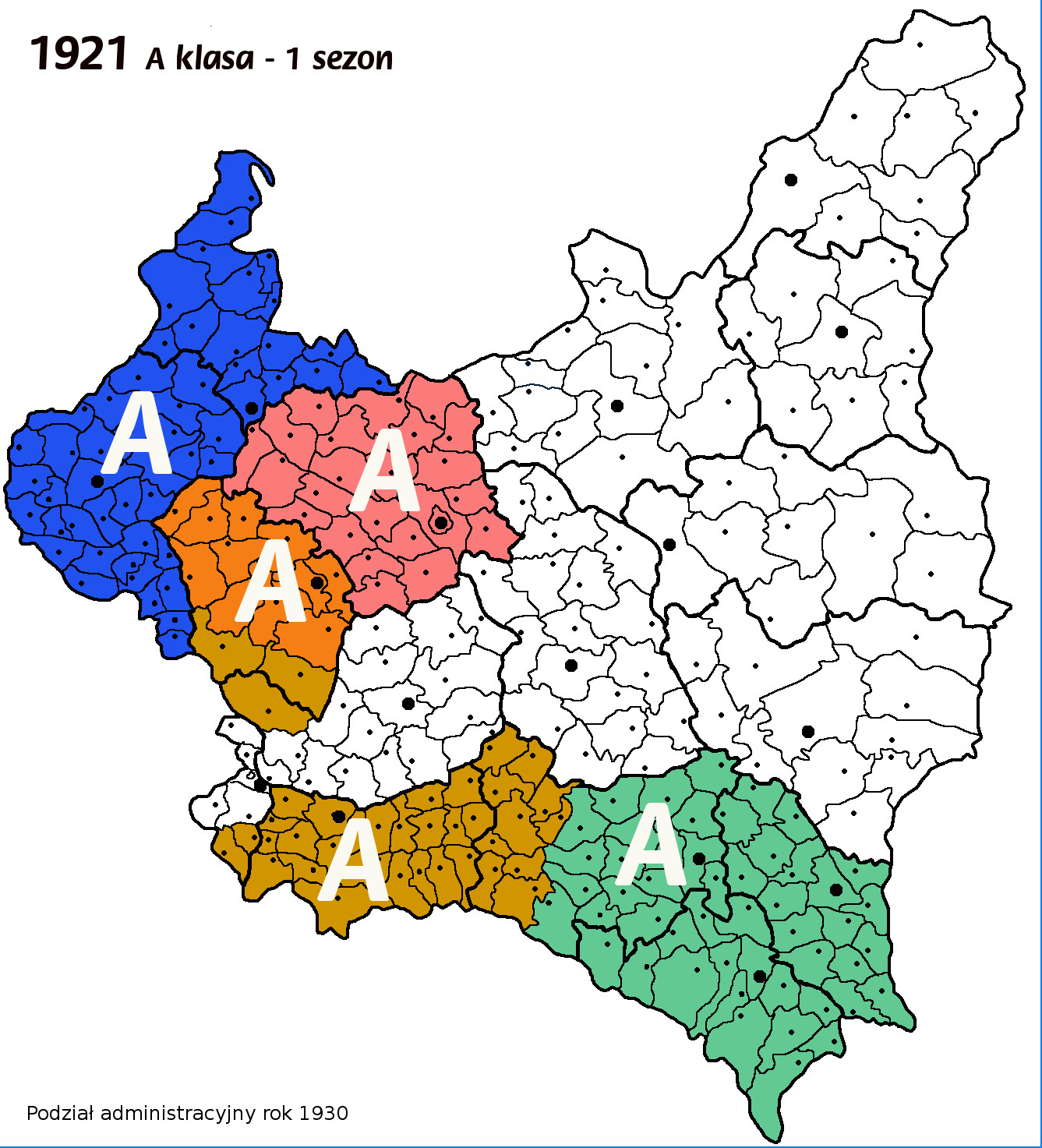
Five regional A-Classes, whose winners competed in the national championship.

1921 Polish Football Championship was the 2nd edition of the Polish Football Championship (Non-League) and 1st completed season ended with the selection of a winner. The championship was decided in final tournament played among five teams (winners of the regional A-Class championship). The champions were Cracovia, who won their 1st Polish title.

== Competition modus ==
The final tournament started on 21 August 1921 and concluded on 30 October 1921 (spring-autumn system). The season was played as a round-robin tournament. The team at the top of the standings won the title. A total of 5 teams participated. Each team played a total of 8 matches, half at home and half away, two games against each other team. Teams received two points for a win and one point for a draw.

== Teams ==
Note: Table lists in alphabetical order.

Team	Location	Venue	Qualified as
Cracovia	Kraków	Stadion Cracovii	Kraków Regional A-Class Championship winner
ŁKS Łódź	Łódź	Boisko przy ulicy Srebrzyńskiej	Łódź Regional A-Class Championship winner
Pogoń Lwów	Lwów	Park Sportowy "Stadion za rogatką stryjską"	Lwów Regional A-Class Championship winner
Polonia Warsaw	Warsaw	Boisko w Parku Sobieskiego na Agrykoli	Warsaw Regional A-Class Championship winner
Warta Poznań	Poznań	Boisko przy placu Ciętym	Poznań Regional A-Class Championship winner

== Final tournament table ==
Pos	Team	Pld	W	D	L	GF	GA	GD	Pts
1	Cracovia	8	7	1	0	31	7	+24	15
2	Polonia Warsaw	8	5	0	3	13	9	+4	10
3	Warta Poznań	8	3	2	3	14	24	−10	8
4	Pogoń Lwów	8	3	0	5	19	13	+6	6
5	ŁKS Łódź	8	0	1	7	7	31	−24	1

Source: rsssf.com

== Top goalscorers ==
Rank	Player	Club	Goals
1	(Poland) Józef Kałuża	Cracovia	9
2	(Poland) Wacław Kuchar	Pogoń Lwów	8
3	(Poland) Bolesław Kotapka	Cracovia	7
3	(Poland) Marian Einbacher	Warta Poznań	7

== Medal squads ==
(Tournament appearances and goals listed in brackets)

1st Cracovia

Goalkeepers: Stefan Popiel (6 / -4), Eugeniusz Latacz (1 / -1), Gustaw Rogalski (1 / -2).
Defenders: Tadeusz Synowiec (8), Stanisław Mielech (1 / 3), Gustaw Nowak (1), Leon Sperling (1), Henryk Limanowski (1).
Midfielders: Zdzisław Styczeń (8), Ludwik Gintel (8 / 4), Stanisław Cikowski (8 / 3), Stefan Fryc (8), Zygmunt Chruściński (3 / 1), Tadeusz Dąbrowski (1).
Forwards: Józef Kałuża (8 / 9), Bolesław Kotapka (6 / 7), Adam Kogut (6 / 4).

Manager: (Hungary) Imre Pozsonyi.

2nd Polonia Warsaw

Goalkeepers: .
Defenders: .
Midfielders: .
Forwards: .

One own goal scored by .

Manager: .

3rd Warta Poznań

Goalkeepers: .
Defenders: .
Midfielders: .
Forwards: .

Manager: .

== Bibliography ==
- Gowarzewski, Andrzej (2000). Encyklopedia Piłkarska Fuji. Liga Polska. O tytuł mistrza Polski 1920–2000 (in Polish). GiA, Katowice. ISBN 83-88232-02-9.
- Gowarzewski, Andrzej (1994). Encyklopedia Piłkarska Fuji. 75 lat PZPN. Księga jubileuszowa (in Polish). GiA, Katowice. ISBN 83-902751-1-2.
- Gowarzewski, Andrzej (2000). Encyklopedia Piłkarska Fuji. Album 80 lat PZPN (in Polish). GiA, Katowice.
- Gowarzewski, Andrzej (2010). Encyklopedia Piłkarska Fuji. Album 90 lat PZPN (in Polish). GiA, Katowice.
