= Kazimierz Węgrzyn =

Polish footballer and commentator

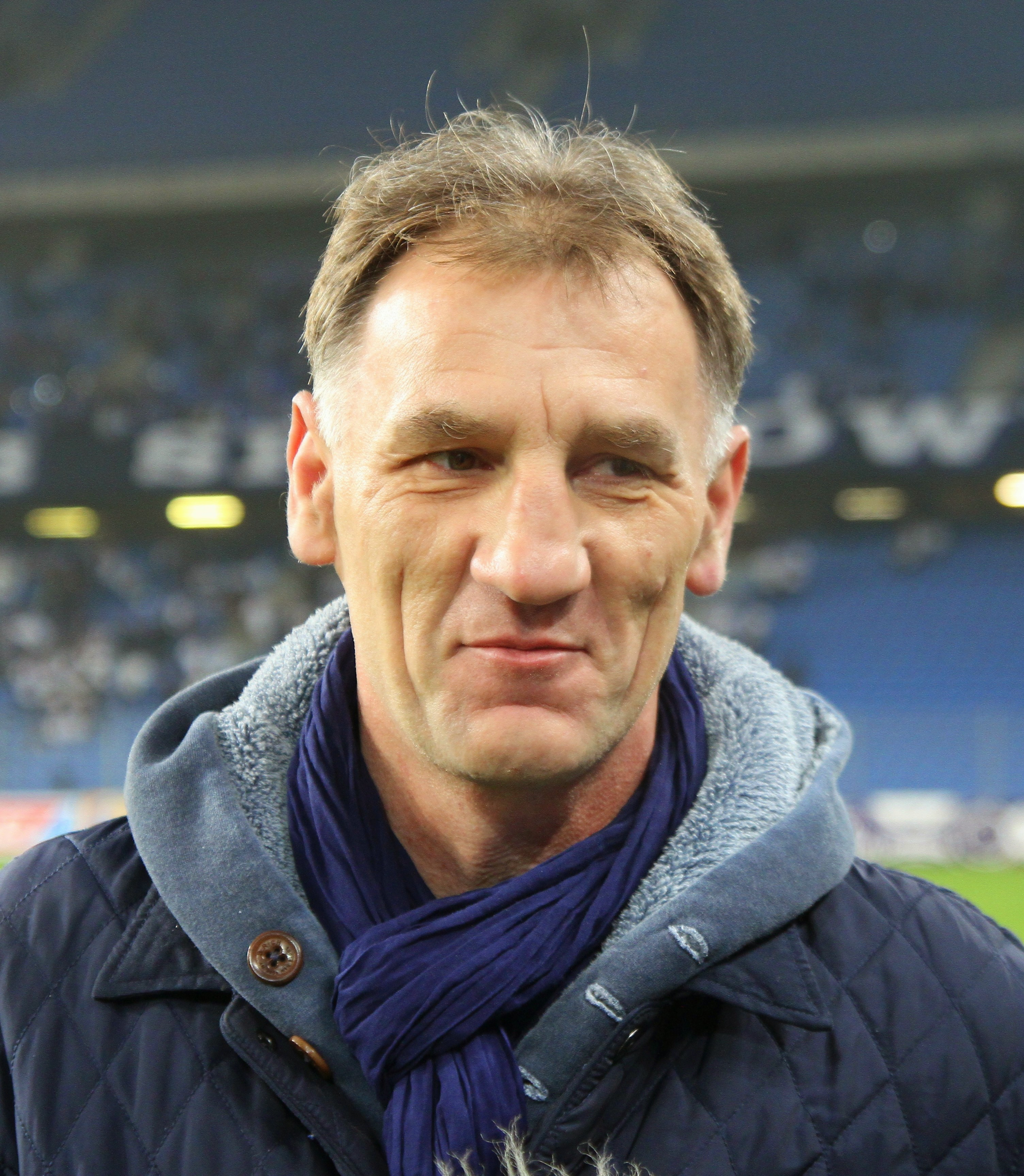

Personal information
- Date of birth: 13 April 1967 (age 59)
- Place of birth: Biłgoraj, Poland
- Height: 1.93 m (6 ft 4 in)
- Position: Defender

Youth career
- Łada Biłgoraj

Senior career*
Years	Team	Apps	(Gls)
1986–1987	Motor Lublin	0	(0)
1987–1993	Hutnik Kraków	82	(4)
1993–1996	GKS Katowice	105	(14)
1997–1998	SV Ried	33	(2)
1998–2000	Wisła Kraków	67	(8)
2001–2002	Pogoń Szczecin	44	(4)
2002–2003	Widzew Łódź	38	(4)
2003–2005	Cracovia	54	(5)

International career
1991–1999	Poland	20	(0)
- * Club domestic league appearances and goals

Kazimierz Węgrzyn (born 13 April 1967) is a Polish football pundit, co-commentator and former player who played as a defender.

== Career ==
=== Club ===
During his career he played for such a clubs like Wisła Kraków, Cracovia or GKS Katowice.

=== International ===
He played 20 matches for Poland national team from 1991 to 1999.

== Honours ==
GKS Katowice

- Polish Super Cup: 1995

Wisła Kraków

- Ekstraklasa: 1998–99
