= Football in Poland =

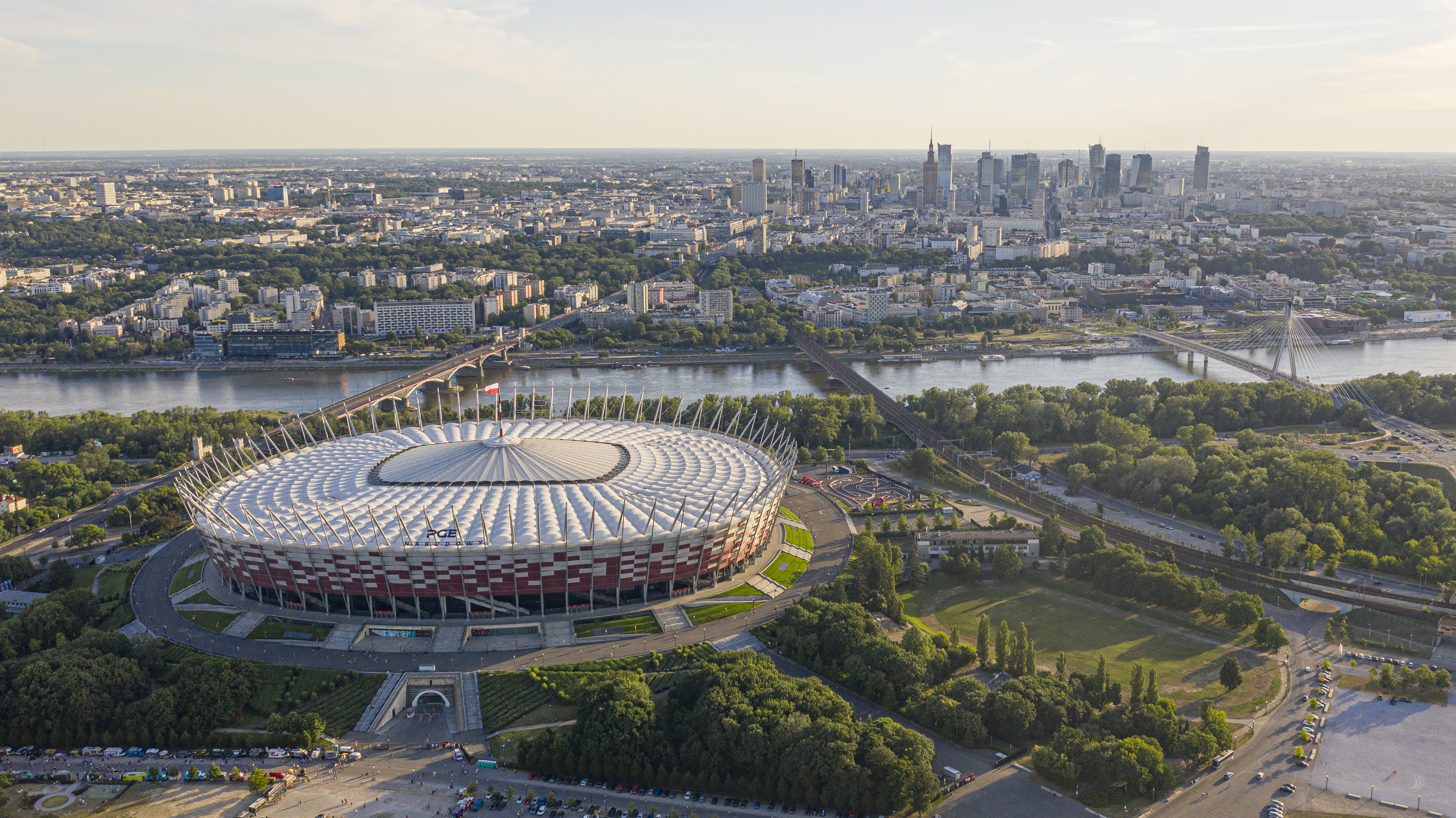
- The Kazimierz Górski National Stadium in Warsaw.
- Country: Poland
- Governing body: PZPN
- National teams: Men's national team Women's national team
- First played: 1921; 105 years ago

National competitions
- FIFA World Cup; UEFA European Championship; UEFA Nations League

Club competitions
- List: League: Ekstraklasa I liga II liga III liga IV liga V liga Liga okręgowa Klasa A Klasa B; Cups: Polish Cup Polish Super Cup

International competitions
- FIFA Club World Cup; FIFA Intercontinental Cup; UEFA Champions League; UEFA Europa League; UEFA Conference League; UEFA Super Cup

Audience records
- Single match: Górnik Z. vs. Austria W. 18 September 1963; Stadion Śląski; 120,000 spectators

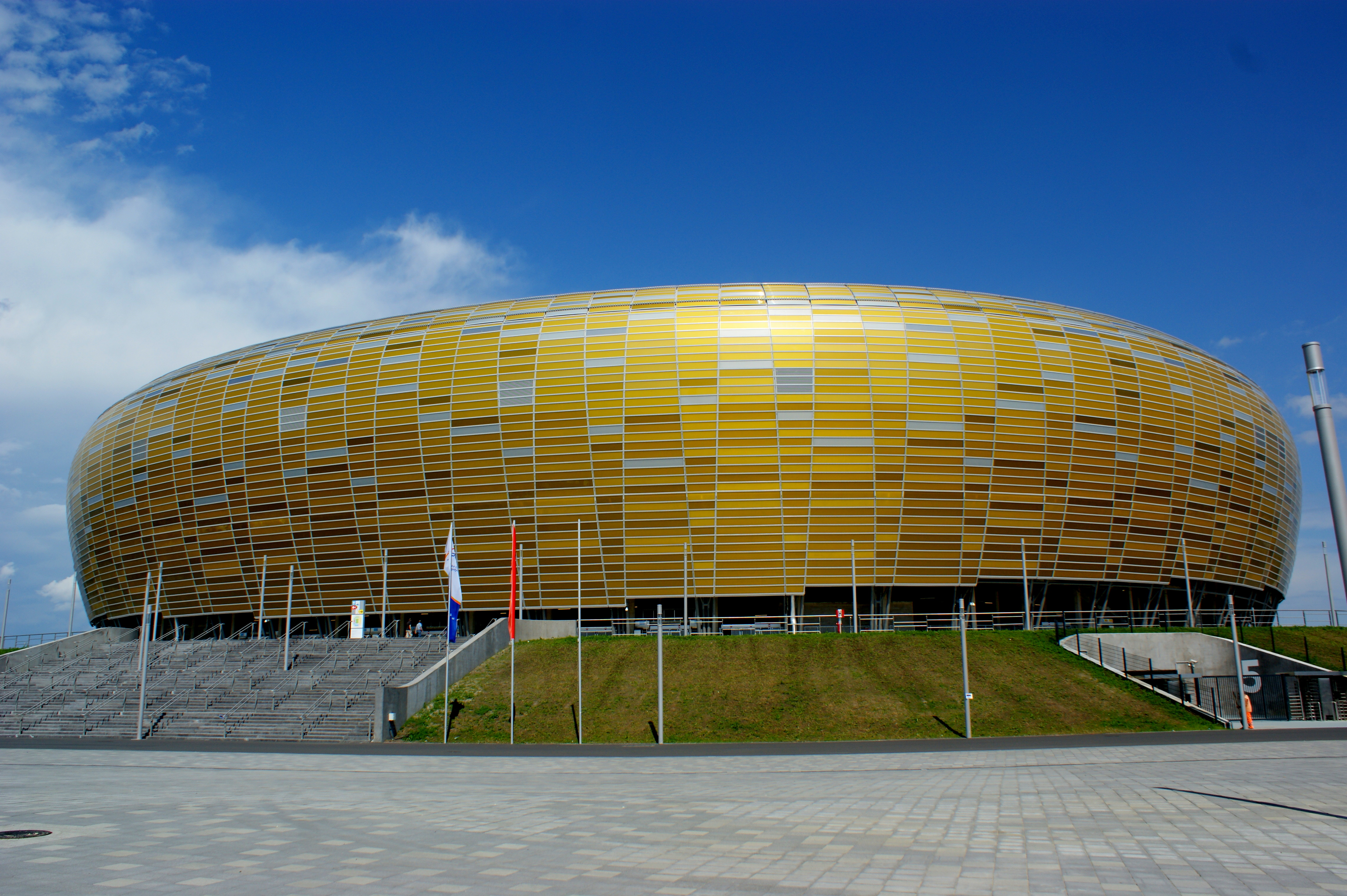
The Stadion Miejski in Gdańsk.

Football is the most popular sport in Poland. Over 400,000 Poles play football regularly, with millions more playing occasionally. 67% of the Poles are interested in football and 27% are very interested in it. The first professional clubs were founded in the early 1900s, and the Poland national football team played its first international match in 1921.

There are hundreds of professional and amateur football teams in Poland; which are under the auspices of the national 1st league, 2nd level, 3rd level, 4 parallel divisions of 4th level, 16 regional parallel divisions of 5th level and a variety of other lower-level leagues. Additionally, there are the Polish Cup and Polish Super Cup competitions.

== History ==
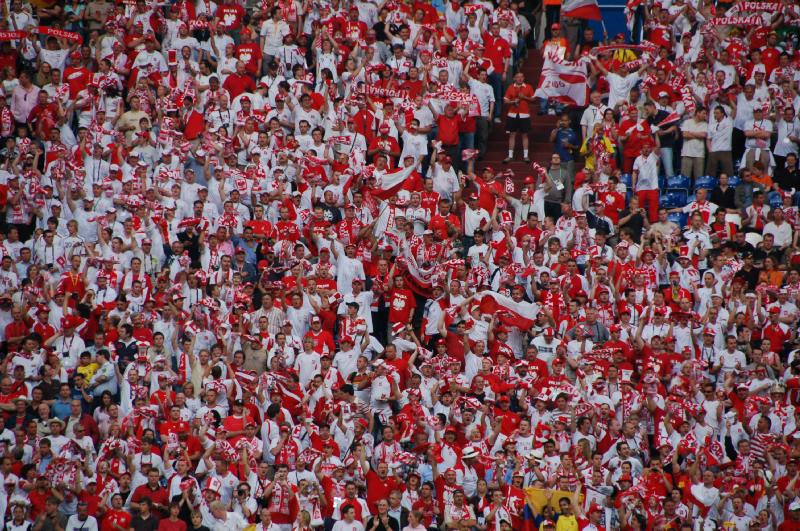
Polish fans during the 2006 FIFA World Cup.

The history of football in Poland started in the late 19th century with the rising popularity of the new sport. At the time, the Polish state was partitioned. The first decades of Polish football are therefore connected with the history of Football in Austria and the Austrian Football Association, which was founded in 1904.

The first Polish football clubs were Lechia Lwów (1903), Czarni Lwów (1903), Pogoń Lwów (1904), KS Cracovia (1906) and Wisła Kraków (1906). The Polish national federation, called the Polish Football Union (Polski Związek Piłki Nożnej, PZPN), was founded on 20 December 1919, in Kraków when 31 delegates elected Edward Cetnarowski as the first president. The PZPN joined FIFA in 1923 and UEFA in 1955.

In a similar fashion to other European states, football appeared in Poland in the late 19th century. In 1888 Prof. Henryk Jordan, a court physician of the Habsburgs and the pioneer of sports in Poland, opened a sports park in Kraków's Błonia, a large open space surrounding the demolished city walls of that town. The park, along with the Sokół society founded in 1867, became the main centres to promote sports and healthy living in Poland. It was Jordan who began promoting football as a healthy sport in the open air; some sources also credit him with bringing the first football to Poland from his travels to Brunswick in 1890. Other sources mention Dr. Edmund Cenar as the one to bring the first ball and the one to translate The Cambridge Rules and parts of the International Football Association Board regulations to Polish language.

On 14 July 1894 during the Second Sokół Jamboree in Lwów a short football match was played between the Sokół members of Lwów and those from Kraków. It lasted only six minutes and was seen as a curiosity rather than a potentially popular sport. Nevertheless, it was the first recorded football match in Polish history. (Note: In fact there was a previous meeting mentioned by the press in Kraków in 1892, though no details are known) It was won by the Lwów team after Włodzimierz Chomicki scored the only goal - the first known goal in Polish history.

This match precipitated the popularity of the new sport in Poland. Initially the rules and regulations were very simplified, with the size of the field and the ball varying greatly. Despite being discouraged by many educational societies and the state authorities, the new sport gained extreme popularity among pupils of various gymnasiums in Galicia. The first football teams were formed and in 1903–1904, four Lwów-based gymnasiums formed their own sport clubs: the IV Gymnasium for Boys formed a club later renamed to Pogoń Lwów, while the pupils of the I and II State Schools formed the Sława Lwów club, later renamed to Czarni Lwów.

On 6 June 1906 a representation of Lwów youth came to Kraków for a repeat match, this time composed of two already organized teams, the Czarni and the team of the IV Gymnasium. Kraków's representation was badly beaten in both meetings (4-0 and 2-0 respectively). The same summer the Buffalo Bill Wild West Show set up camp at Kraków's Błonia, right outside of the traditional playground area and Jordan's garden. On 5 August 1906 the team of the Kraków-based Jan Sobieski Gymnasium played a match against the British and American members of Buffalo Bill's troupe, winning 1–0. The only goal scored by Stanisław Szeligowski was also the first goal scored by a Polish team in an international meeting. The success led to the popularisation of football in Kraków and to creation of the first Kraków-based professional football team, KS Cracovia - initially composed primarily of students of the Jan Sobieski Gymnasium. By the autumn of that year there were already 16 teams in Kraków, including Wisła Kraków (It is said that actually Wisła Kraków was the first professional football team and not Cracovia). In 1911, a Kraków-based Union of Polish Football for Galicia was formed and entered the Austrian Football Association. The union inspired the creation of a number of teams.

After the outbreak of World War I, most of the Galician football players, many of them members of either Strzelec or Sokół, joined Piłsudski's Polish Legions. The unit, fighting alongside the Austro-Hungarian Army, fought mostly in various parts of Russian-held Poland, which led to popularisation of the new sport in other parts of Poland. After Poland regained her independence, on 21 December 1919 the Polish Football Association (PZPN) was formed. Headed by Edward Centrarowski, it united most of the then-existent Polish football clubs. The league could not be formed due to the Polish-Bolshevik War, but in 1922 the PZPN published the rules of football and the following year it joined FIFA. In 1921 the league was resumed and the first champions of Poland were KS Cracovia, followed by Pogoń Lwów in 1922, 1923, 1925 and 1926. As Poland was then a fully independent state, in 1921 the Poland national football team was formed. On 18 December 1921 it played its first international match in Budapest against the Hungarian team and was defeated 1–0. In the third international match in Stockholm on 28 May 1922 Poland defeated Sweden 2–1, scoring its first international victory.

During World War II, football in occupied Poland was subject to significant restrictions (see Football in occupied Poland (1939–1945)) for more.

In 1955, the PZPN became one of the founding members of UEFA.

== Women's football ==
In 1979, a Polish women's football league, the Ekstraliga, was established.

On 3 December 2024, the Polish women's national team made history by defeating Austria 1–0 in Vienna via a 94th minute goal by captain Ewa Pajor, thereby defeating the Austrians 2–0 on aggregate in a home and away playoff tie, and qualifying for their first ever major international tournament, the 2025 UEFA Women's Euro.

== Corruption in Polish football ==
In 2005, Polish authorities began an investigation into widespread corruption within Polish football.

In July 2006, the Polish sports minister criticized the PZPN (Polish Football Association) for failing to take adequate steps to fight corruption, and announced an audit of the organization. In January 2007, PZPN board member Wit Żelazko was arrested by Wrocław police. Shortly thereafter, the entire PZPN board was suspended by the sports ministry. This move displeased FIFA which announced that the principle of autonomy of football associations was of utmost importance. The Polish sports ministry, Prime Minister Jarosław Kaczyński, and most fans felt that the battle against corruption was more important, but when FIFA threatened sanctions, the sports ministry backed down and agreed to re-instate the PZPN board.

In September 2008, the Polish Olympic Committee made a request to the Polish Arbitration Tribunal to suspend the management of the PZPN a second time, stating that the PZPN was guilty of "[violating] its statutes in a continuous and flagrant fashion." This request was granted and Robert Zawłocki was named as temporary administrator. However, FIFA again threatened to suspend Polish teams from international competition.

On 15 April 2009, the total number of arrests reached 200, including referees, observers, coaches, players as well as some high-ranking officials of the PZPN. By the end of April 2009, only 15 referees remained who were allowed to preside over top-flight matches.

== World Cup ==
Poland national football team have qualified for the finals on nine occasions, most recently for the 2022 FIFA World Cup.

=== Table ===
Year	Result	Position	GP	W	D*	L	GS	GA
(Uruguay) 1930	did not enter							
(Italy) 1934	did not enter							
(France) 1938	Round 1	11th	1	0	0	1	5	6
(Brazil) 1950	did not enter							
(Switzerland) 1954	did not enter							
(Sweden) 1958	did not qualify							
(Chile) 1962	did not qualify							
(England) 1966	did not qualify							
(Mexico) 1970	did not qualify							
(West Germany) 1974	Third place	3rd	7	6	0	1	16	5
(Argentina) 1978	Second group stage	5th	6	3	1	2	6	6
(Spain) 1982	Third place	3rd	7	3	3	1	11	5
(Mexico) 1986	Round of 16	14th	4	1	1	2	1	7
(Italy) 1990	did not qualify							
(United States) 1994	did not qualify							
(France) 1998	did not qualify							
(South Korea) (Japan) 2002	Group stage	25th	3	1	0	2	3	7
(Germany) 2006	Group stage	21st	3	1	0	2	2	4
(South Africa) 2010	did not qualify							
(Brazil) 2014	did not qualify							
(Russia) 2018	Group stage	25th	3	1	0	2	2	5
(Qatar) 2022	Round of 16	15th	4	1	1	2	3	5
(Canada) (Mexico) (United States) 2026	did not qualify							
Total	Third place	8/21	38	17	6	15	49	50

Poland's World Cup record
First Match	Poland 5–6 Brazil (5 June 1938; Strasbourg, France)
Biggest Win	Poland 7–0 Haiti (19 June 1974; Munich, West Germany)
Biggest Defeat	Brazil 4–0 Poland (16 June 1986; Guadalajara, Mexico); Poland 0-4 Portugal (10 June 2002; Jeonju, South Korea)
Best Result	Third place in 1974 and 1982
Worst Result	Group stage in 1938, 2002, 2006 and 2018

== European competitions ==
=== UEFA Champions League ===
The following teams have qualified at least for the main phase of the European Cup/UEFA Champions League.

- Semi-finals: Legia Warsaw (1969–70), Widzew Łódź (1982–83)
- Quarter-finals: Legia Warsaw (1970–71, 1995–96)
- Group stage: Widzew Łódź (1996–97), Legia Warsaw (2016–17)
- Preliminary round: Legia Warsaw (1956–57)

=== UEFA Europa League ===
The following teams have qualified for the main phase of the UEFA Europa League.

- Round of 16: Wisła Kraków (2002–03)
- Round of 32: Lech Poznań (2008–09, 2010–11), Legia Warsaw (2011–12, 2014–15, 2016–17), Wisła Kraków (2011–12)
- Group stage: Amica Wronki (2004–05), Wisła Kraków (2006–07), Legia Warsaw (2013–14, 2015–16, 2021–22), Lech Poznań (2015–16, 2020–21)

=== UEFA Conference League ===
The following teams have qualified for the main phase of the UEFA Conference League.

- Quarter-finals: Lech Poznań (2022–23), Jagiellonia Białystok (2024–25), Legia Warsaw (2024–25)

=== UEFA Euro ===
Poland have participated in five UEFA European Championships so far: Euro 2008, Euro 2012, Euro 2016, Euro 2020 and Euro 2024.

On 18 April 2007, the President of UEFA, Michel Platini, announced that the hosts of the 2012 UEFA European Football Championship would be Poland and Ukraine. Both countries automatically qualified for the event.

=== Table ===
UEFA European Championship record
Year	Round	Position	GP	W	D*	L	GS	GA
(France) 1960	Did not qualify							
(Spain) 1964	Did not qualify							
(Italy) 1968	Did not qualify							
(Belgium) 1972	Did not qualify							
(Socialist Federal Republic of Yugoslavia) 1976	Did not qualify							
(Italy) 1980	Did not qualify							
(France) 1984	Did not qualify							
(West Germany) 1988	Did not qualify							
(Sweden) 1992	Did not qualify							
(England) 1996	Did not qualify							
(Belgium) (Netherlands) 2000	Did not qualify							
(Portugal) 2004	Did not qualify							
(Austria) (Switzerland) 2008	Group stage	14th	3	0	1	2	1	4
(Poland) (Ukraine) 2012	Group stage	14th	3	0	2	1	2	3
(France) 2016	Quarter-finals	5th	5	2	3	0	4	2
(European Union) 2020	Group stage	21st	3	0	1	2	4	6
(Germany) 2024	Group stage	23d	3	0	1	2	3	6
Total	-	-	17	2	8	7	14	21

== Largest football stadiums in Poland ==
#	Image	Stadium	Capacity	Location	Region	Home team	Opened
1		Kazimierz Górski National Stadium	58,580	Warsaw	Masovian	Poland	2012
2		Silesian Stadium	55,211	Chorzów	Silesian	Poland	1956
3		Wrocław Stadium	45,105	Wrocław	Lower Silesian	Śląsk Wrocław	2011
4		Poznań Stadium	42,837	Poznań	Greater Poland	Lech Poznań	1980
5		Gdańsk Stadium	41,620	Gdańsk	Pomeranian	Lechia Gdańsk	2011

== Attendances ==
The average attendance per top-flight football league season and the club with the highest average attendance:

Season	League average	Best club	Best club average
2024-25	12,651	Lech Poznań	28,947
2023-24	12,322	Lech Poznań	24,852
2022-23	9,403	Legia Warszawa	21,230
2021-22	—	—	—
2020-21	—	—	—
2019-20	8,879	Legia Warszawa	17,376
2018-19	8,808	Legia Warszawa	17,614
2017-18	9,436	Lech Poznań	20,544
2016-17	9,622	Legia Warszawa	20,521
2015-16	9,103	Legia Warszawa	21,209
2014-15	8,325	Lech Poznań	18,999
2013-14	8,338	Lech Poznań	19,575
2012-13	8,409	Lech Poznań	22,640
2011-12	8,849	Legia Warszawa	20,928
2010-11	8,496	Lech Poznań	18,635
2009-10	5,247	Korona Kielce	10,182
2008-09	7,351	Lech Poznań	16,300
2007-08	7,329	Lech Poznań	18,010
2006-07	6,707	Lech Poznań	15,068
2005-06	5,522	Wisła Kraków	10,467
2004-05	5,230	Pogoń Szczecin	9,846
2003-04	5,492	Lech Poznań	14,846
2002-03	5,142	Lech Poznań	15,133
2001-02	4,078	Wisła Kraków	7,286
2000-01	4,465	Pogoń Szczecin	9,967
1999-2000	4,622	Pogoń Szczecin	9,687
1998-99	4,158	Wisła Kraków	7,720
1997-98	4,352	Ostrowiec Świętokrzyski	8,895
1996-97	3,818	Stomil Olsztyn	6,500
1995-96	4,264	Stomil Olsztyn	9,824
1994-95	4,209	Stomil Olsztyn	10,441
1993-94	4,236	Legia Warszawa	10,441
1992-93	3,724	Lech Poznań	7,765
1991-92	4,778	Lech Poznań	10,199
1990-91	4,471	Wisła Kraków	7,867
1989-90	7,404	Zawisza Bydgoszcz	15,811
1988-89	8,407	Jagiellonia Białystok	19,659
1987-88	9,840	Jagiellonia Białystok	26,133
1986-87	9,529	Górnik Zabrze	15,533
1985-86	10,044	Górnik Zabrze	19,067
1984-85	12,358	Lechia Gdańsk	25,400
1983-84	12,066	Lech Poznań	29,536
1982-83	9,598	Lech Poznań	23,533
1981-82	9,816	Pogoń Szczecin	18,267
1980-81	9,954	Zawisza Bydgoszcz	18,667
1979-80	11,082	Zawisza Bydgoszcz	20,867
1978-79	10,831	Arka Gdynia	16,933
1977-78	13,339	Wisła Kraków	28,200
1976-77	14,358	Pogoń Szczecin	21,800
1975-76	13,833	Pogoń Szczecin	23,667
1974-75	13,814	Lech Poznań	32,333
1973-74	13,939	Lech Poznań	34,867
1972-73	14,783	Lech Poznań	44,615
1971-72	12,971	ŁKS	27,538
1970-71	10,905	Ruch Chorzów	15,231
1969-70	10,192	Górnik Zabrze	15,077
1968-69	12,155	Ruch Chorzów	16,538
1967-68	13,375	Ruch Chorzów	29,615
1966-67	12,211	ŁKS	20,000
1965-66	13,857	Śląsk Wrocław	24,154
1964-65	11,387	Śląsk Wrocław	23,923
1963-64	11,481	Górnik Zabrze	16,692
1962-63	11,335	Pogoń Szczecin	16,462
1962	15,523	Górnik Zabrze	26,000
1961	13,115	Cracovia	18,923
1960	15,473	Wisła Kraków	19,273
1959	17,697	Pogoń Szczecin	24,182
1958	17,023	ŁKS	28,545
1957	17,402	Górnik Zabrze	27,273
1956	15,879	ŁKS	26,364
1955	13,515	ŁKS	23,364
1954	12,891	ŁKS	27,000
1953	10,867	Ruch Chorzów	16,364
1952	10,859	Lechia Gdańsk	18,000
1951	13,515	ŁKS	18,000
1950	11,464	ŁKS	18,091
1949	11,427	ŁKS	17,400
1948	8,431	Cracovia	12,214

== See also ==
- Sports in Poland
- Poland national football team
- Ekstraklasa
- Młoda Ekstraklasa
- Centralna Liga Juniorów
- List of Polish football champions
- List of derbies in Poland
- List of football stadiums in Poland
- Polish Cup
- Polish Super Cup
- Polish women's national football team
- Ekstraliga
- Polish Cup (women)
- 1921 Hungary v Poland football match
- Brazil v Poland (1938 FIFA World Cup)
- 1939 Poland v Hungary football match
- Polish football in the interwar period
- Football Junior Championships of Poland
- Polish Football League (1927–1939)
- Football hooliganism in Poland
- Sunday of Miracles
