= Piotr Bania =

Polish footballer

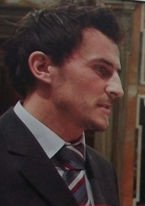

Personal information
- Full name: Piotr Bania
- Date of birth: 6 February 1973 (age 53)
- Place of birth: Kraków, Poland
- Height: 1.80 m (5 ft 11 in)
- Position: Forward

Senior career*
Years	Team	Apps	(Gls)
1992–1993	Wawel Kraków		
1993–1998	Kabel Kraków		
1998	Hutnik Kraków		
1998–1999	Kabel Kraków		
1999	Cracovia		
1999–2000	Proszowianka Proszowice		
2000–2007	Cracovia		
2007	Wisła Płock	16	(3)
2008–2010	Sandecja Nowy Sącz	53	(17)
2012–2014	Družstevník Plavnica		
2015–2016	Wierchy Rabka Zdrój	26	(9)
2017	Dunajec Nowy Sącz	6	(7)
2017	Ogniwo Piwniczna-Zdrój	5	(0)
2018–2019	AKS Ujanowice	3	(1)
- * Club domestic league appearances and goals

Piotr Bania (born 6 February 1973) is a Polish former professional footballer who played as a forward.

== Career ==
He had also played for Kabel Kraków, Hutnik Kraków, Proszowianka Proszowice, Sandecja Nowy Sącz and Družstevník Plavnica.

== Honours ==
Individual

- II liga top scorer: 2003–04
