= Adam Kogut =

Polish footballer (1895–1940)

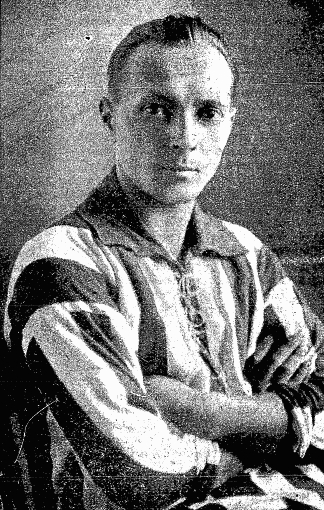

Personal information
- Full name: Adam Władysław Kogut
- Date of birth: 4 December 1895
- Place of birth: Kraków, Austria-Hungary
- Date of death: 16 April 1940 (aged 44)
- Place of death: Katyń, Poland
- Height: 1.63 m (5 ft 4 in)
- Position: Forward

Senior career*
| Years | Team | Apps | (Gls) |
| 1912 | Robotniczy KS Kraków | | |
| 1913 | Polonia Kraków | | |
| 1913 | Krakus Kraków | | |
| 1914–1918 | Cracovia | | |
| 1918–1919 | Wisła Kraków | | |
| 1919–1923 | Cracovia | | |
| 1924 | Polonia Przemyśl | | |
| 1924–1926 | Czarni Radom | | |
| 1927–1928 | Polonia Warsaw | | |
| 1928–1929 | Gwiazda Warsaw | | |

International career
| 1922 | Poland | 1 | (0) |
- * Club domestic league appearances and goals

Adam Władysław Kogut (4 December 1895 – 16 April 1940) was a Polish footballer who played as a forward.

He made one appearance for the Poland national team in 1922. His notable football clubs included Cracovia and Polonia Warsaw.

He was murdered in the Katyn Massacre during World War II.
