= Boyarsky =

Boyarsky (masculine; Russian: Боярский) or Boyarskaya (feminine; Russian: Боярская) is a Russian surname, derived from "boyar" (nobleman). It may refer to:

- Aleksandr Boyarsky (born 1956), a Russian producer, scriptwriter, and voice artist. He is the founder and CEO of the Melnitsa Animation Studio.
- Iosif Boyarsky (1917–2008), a Russian animator and film director
- Jerry Boyarsky, a former American football player
- Elizaveta Boyarskaya (born 1985), a Russian actress, daughter of Mikhail Boyarsky
- Leonard Boyarsky, an American computer game designer and visual artist
- Maurizio Boyarsky (1923–1998), pseudonym of American mathematician Bernard Dwork
- Mikhail Boyarsky (born 1949), a Russian actor and singer
- Natalia Boyarskaya (born 1983), a Russian professional racing cyclist
- Natalya Boyarskaya (1946–2025), a Russian violinist and music teacher
- Sergey Boyarsky (born 1980), a Russian politician, son of Mikhail Boyarsky
- Vladimir Boyarsky, a Russian general

== See also ==
- Boyarskaya Duma
