= Marcin Bojarski =

Polish striker

Personal information
- Full name: Marcin Bojarski
- Date of birth: 28 August 1977 (age 49)
- Place of birth: Częstochowa, Poland
- Height: 1.74 m (5 ft 9 in)
- Position: Striker

Senior career*
Years	Team	Apps	(Gls)
1996–1999	Raków Częstochowa	57	(14)
2000	GKS Katowice	36	(13)
2001–2001	Legia Warsaw	9	(0)
2001	Lech Poznań	7	(1)
2002	RKS Radomsko	3	(2)
2002–2004	GKS Katowice	42	(11)
2004–2008	Cracovia	110	(23)
2008–2009	Piast Gliwice	18	(1)
2010	Pogoń Szczecin	24	(2)
2011	Puszcza Niepołomice	16	(0)
2011	Orzeł Balin	9	(7)
2013–2016	FC Blaubeuren		
2016–2018	TSV Albeck 1948	33	(8)
- * Club domestic league appearances and goals

Marcin Bojarski (born 28 August 1977) is a Polish former professional footballer who played as a striker.

== Honours ==
Legia Warsaw

- Ekstraklasa: 2001–02
- Polish League Cup: 2001–02

Lech Poznań

- I liga: 2001–02
