= Edward Cetnarowski =

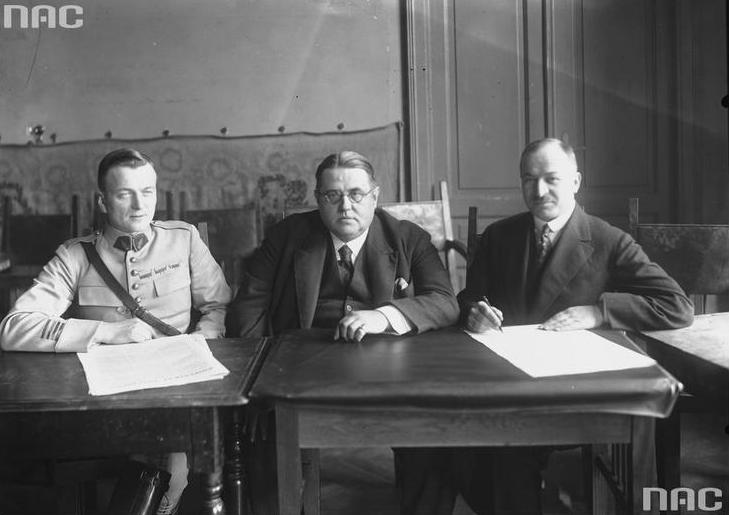
Authorities of the Polish Football Association. Representatives of the Management Board of the Polish Football Association (PZPN). From the left: vice-president Major Marian Esman, president Dr. Edward Cetnarowski and secretary general Wacław Wojakowski.

Edward Cetnarowski (3 October 1877 – 3 September 1933) was a Polish sports official, gynaecologist and one of the most famous personalities of the sports club Cracovia.

== Biography ==
Cetnarowski was born on 3 October 1877 in Rzeszów. Even though he was regarded as one of the top Polish gynecologists (he was an assistant to the famous doctor Henryk Jordan), he is most renowned as director of Cracovia, which in the 1920s and 1930s was one of the strongest sports clubs in Poland. During this time, Cracovia, in spite of financial crises shaking Poland, became a team known all over Europe. It was he who organized Cracovia's tournee to Spain in the mid-1920s. He cared for all sections, including soccer.

Cetnarowski was co-founder of the Polish Football Association (PZPN), and in the years 1919-1928 was its official director, and after that the honorary director. However, when in 1927 most Polish soccer teams, against the will of the PZPN, decided to organize the Soccer League, he realized that he had lost and quit. Soon afterwards the seat of PZPN was moved from Kraków to Warsaw which indicated that Cetnarowski lost almost all influence. He had always been keen on preserving the amateur character of Polish football, and this attitude became old fashioned as time went by.

Cetnarowski died suddenly on 3 September 1933 in Kraków, at the age of 55, during the game of Cracovia's female handball team. Most probably, heart failure together with excessive weight contributed to his death. The funeral was a big event in Kraków, thousands of mourners gathered to bid him final farewell.

== External reference ==
- Edward Cetnarowski in KS Cracovia online encyclopedia
