= Józef Kałuża =

Polish footballer and coach

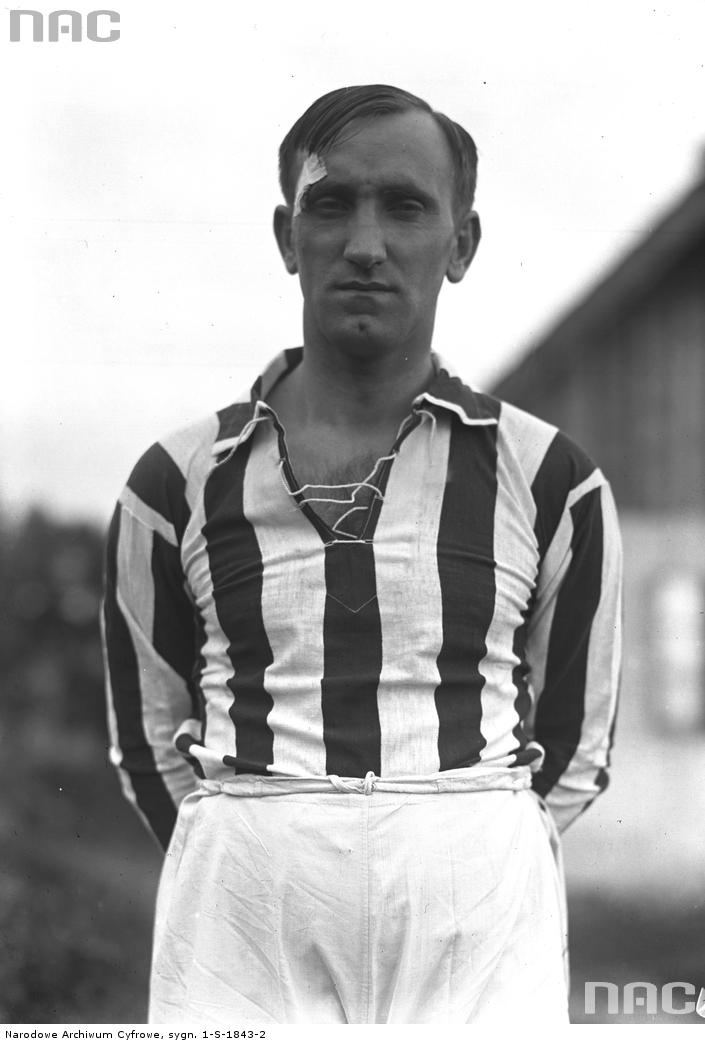

Personal information
- Full name: Józef Ignacy Kałuża
- Date of birth: 11 February 1896
- Place of birth: Przemyśl, Austria-Hungary
- Date of death: 11 October 1944 (aged 48)
- Place of death: Kraków, Poland
- Height: 1.66 m (5 ft 5 1/2 in)
- Position: Striker

Senior career*
Years	Team	Apps	(Gls)
1909–1911	Robotniczy KS Kraków		
1911–1931	Cracovia		

International career
1913	Galicia	1	(0)
1921–1928	Poland	16	(7)

Managerial career
- 1927–1928: Cracovia
- 1930: Legia Warsaw
- 1932–1939: Poland
- * Club domestic league appearances and goals

Józef Ignacy Kałuża (11 February 1896 – 11 October 1944) was a Polish footballer and later coach, regarded as one of the best Polish footballers of the 1920s.

== Club career ==
Kałuża was one of the most experienced forward players of 1920s Poland. His whole career was connected with Cracovia - he won his first Polish championship in with the team. By 1921, Kałuża had scored 297 goals in 200 games. Altogether, he played 408 games in Cracovia’s jersey, scoring 465 goals. From 1921 to 1928, Kałuża represented Poland in 16 international games, scoring 7 goals.

== Career statistics ==
Club	Season	Ekstraklasa		Galician Championship		Kraków A-Class		Friendlies		Total	
Club	Season	Apps	Goals	Apps	Goals	Apps	Goals	Apps	Goals	Apps	Goals
Cracovia	1912	0	0	0	0	0	0	27	22	27	22
Cracovia	1913	0	0	4	2	0	0	26	29	31	31
Cracovia	1914	0	0	3	2	0	0	14	15	17	17
Cracovia	1915	0	0	0	0	0	0	0	0	0	0
Cracovia	1916	0	0	0	0	0	0	3	5	3	5
Cracovia	1917	0	0	0	0	0	0	16	33	16	33
Cracovia	1918	0	0	0	0	0	0	27	36	27	36
Cracovia	1919	0	0	0	0	0	0	22	59	22	59
Cracovia	1920	0	0	0	0	4	10	17	27	21	39
Cracovia	1921	8	9	0	0	6	15	24	31	38	55
Cracovia	1922	0	0	0	0	5	5	9	13	14	18
Cracovia	1923	0	0	0	0	6	4	16	9	20	13
Cracovia	1924	0	0	0	0	8	6	21	8	29	14
Cracovia	1925	0	0	0	0	0	0	23	20	23	20
Cracovia	1926	4	4	0	0	9	10	11	13	24	27
Cracovia	1927	0	0	0	0	3	2	26	23	29	25
Cracovia	1928	20	9	0	0	0	0	4	7	24	16
Cracovia	1929	23	10	0	0	0	0	7	7	30	17
Cracovia	1930	0	0	0	0	0	0	1	2	1	2
Cracovia	1931	0	0	0	0	0	0	1	0	1	0
Cracovia	Total	47	23	7	4	41	52	295	361	397	412

== Later life ==
In 1932, after retiring from his playing career, he became the head coach of the Poland national football team. Under his guidance, Poland gradually started achieving international success. In 1936, at the Berlin Olympic Games, the white-and-red team secured fourth place. Two years later, during the 1938 FIFA World Cup, Poland narrowly lost 5–6 in an intense match against Brazil. This iconic game remains celebrated not only as one of the greatest in Polish football history but also as one of the most memorable matches in World Cup history.

Kałuża's final game as coach occurred on Sunday, August 27, 1939, in Warsaw. Poland played exceptionally well, defeating the then vice-champions of the world, Hungary, 4–2. This match marked the last game of interwar Poland, as Germany invaded Poland on September 1, 1939, igniting World War II.

During the war, Kałuża, one of the few officials of the Polish Football Federation (PZPN), stayed in his homeland, where he died in 1944. In 1946, to honor him, PZPN started organising the Józef Kałuża Cup, but the initiative was abandoned after a few years. Józef Piłsudski's Cracovia Stadium is situated on Kałuża Street.

== Honours ==
Cracovia

- Polish Football Championship: 1921

Individual

- Polish Football Championship top scorer: 1921

== See also ==
- The last game: 27 August 1939. Poland - Hungary 4–2

Sporting positions
Preceded by (Poland) Stefan Loth	Poland National Team Coach; 29 May 1932 – 27 August 1939	Succeeded by (Poland) Henryk Reyman
