= KS Lublinianka =

Association football club in Poland

- Full name: Klub Sportowy Lublinianka Sp. z o.o.
- Nickname: Wojskowi (The Militarians)
- Founded: 1921; 105 years ago (as WKS Lublin)
- Ground: MOSiR Stadium
- Capacity: 500
- Chairman: Tomasz Grodzki
- Manager: Daniel Koczon
- League: IV liga Lublin
- 2025–26: IV liga Lublin, 5th of 16
- Website: https://lublinianka.eu

KS Lublinianka is a Polish professional football club based in Lublin. It was founded in 1921 as WKS Lublin (Wojskowy Klub Sportowy Lublin, English: Military Sports Club) and was supported by the Lublin garrison of the Polish Army. In 1923, WKS Lublin was renamed to Klub Sportowy Lublinianka. In 1938 the club won the Football Junior Championships of Poland. They spent eleven seasons in the Polish First League and in the 1969–70 season they reached the quarterfinals of the Polish Cup. Lublinianka currently plays in the IV liga Lublin.

Lublinianka is the oldest sports organization in the city of Lublin, and one of the oldest in the region. It continues the traditions of pre-war Wojskowy Klub Sportowy (Military Sports Club) Unia Lublin. The origins of Lublinianka date back to 1921. At that time, it had two departments: football, and track and field. In 1923, the organization split into WKS Lublin and KS Lublinianka, to be reunited in 1927 as WKS Unia.

== Naming history ==
- 1921 – Wojskowy Klub Sportowy Lublin,
- 1923 – Klub Sportowy Lublinianka,
- 1926 – Wojskowy Klub Sportowy Unia Lublin,
- 1944 – Wojskowy Klub Sportowy Lublinianka,
- 1950 – Ogniwo Wojskowy Klub Sportowy Lublin,
- 1953 – Garnizonowy Wojskowy Klub Sportowy Lublin,
- 1954 – Ogniwo Lublin,
- 1955 – Wojskowy Klub Sportowy Lublinianka,
- 1994 – Klub Sportowy Lublinianka,
- 2002 – Klub Sportowy Lublinianka Sportowa Spółka Akcyjna,
- 2011 – Klub Sportowy Lublinianka – Wieniawa,
- 2013 – Klub Sportowy Lublinianka

== Timeline ==
- summer 1921 – Wojskowy Klub Sportowy (WKS, Military Sports Club) Lublin is formed by Colonel Felicjan Sterba of the Polish Army
- 1923 – Reserve team of WKS Lublin forms Klub Sportowy Lublinianka (KSL)
- 1924 – Lublinianka wins regional championship of A Class
- 1925 – Lublinianka qualifies to national championship playoffs, losing to the champion, Pogoń Lwów
- 1926 – Lublinianka qualifies to national championship playoffs, losing to Pogoń Lwów and Cracovia. As a result of these failures, Lublinianka merges with WKS Lublin, forming WKS Unia
- 1927, 1928, 1930 – Unia wins regional championship, but fails to qualify to the Ekstraklasa
- 1938 – U-19 team of Unia wins the championship of Poland. In the final game (June 4, 1939), it beats Wisła Kraków 3–2
- 1939 – German occupation and World War II begins. Activity suspended.
- 1940 – pre-war player Tomasz Gołębiowski murdered by the Russians in the large Katyn massacre in April–May 1940.
- 1944 – end of German occupation of Lublin, and return of WKS Lublinianka
- 1946 – WKS Lublinianka wins regional championship
- 1949 – Lublinianka qualifies to the Second Division, finishing the season in the second spot, after Garbarnia Kraków
- 1950 – the organization changes the name into Ogniwo Wojskowy Klub Sportowy (OWKS) Lublin
- 1951 – OWKS Lublin finishes second in the Second League, behind Gwardia Warsaw, to be relegated to the Third Division in 1953
- 1953 – the third level of Polish football system is reorganized. The so-called Inter-Voivodeship Leagues are created. OWKS Lublin is renamed into GWKS Lublin (Garnizonowy Wojskowy Klub Sportowy)
- 1955 – Ogniwo Lublin is renamed into Lublinianka
- 1957, 1958 – Lublinianka wins the regional championship

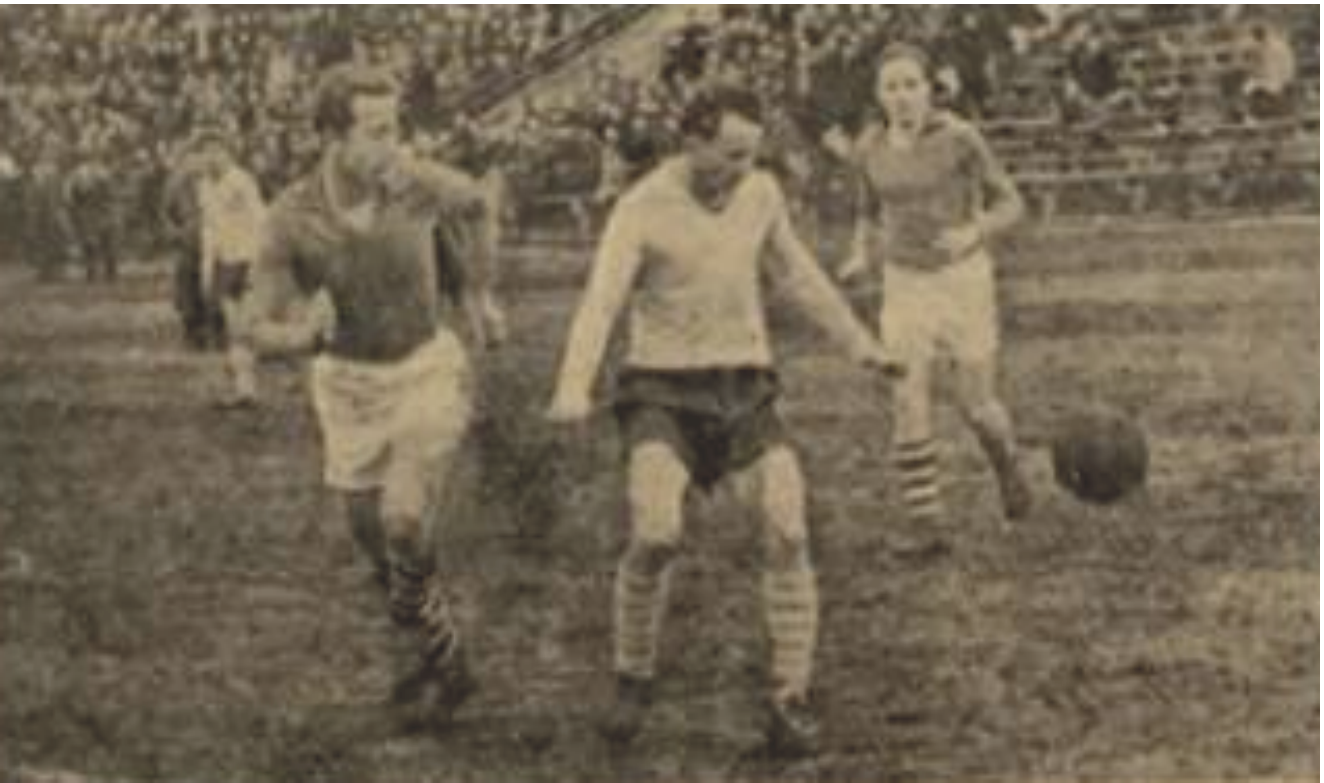
Lublin derby match between Lublianka and Motor Lublin in 1960

- 1960 – after winning the regional championship, WKS Unia qualifies to the Second Division playoffs. It beats Lotnik Warsaw and Gwardia Białystok, to face Hutnik Kraków, Arka Gdynia, Górnik Wałbrzych, AKS Chorzów, and Górnik Konin. Final game of the competition (November 1960, vs. Górnik Wałbrzych) is attended by 20,000 fans. WKS Unia wins 2–0. Soon afterwards, WKS Lublinianka and WKS Unia merge to form WKS Lublinianka
- 1961 – Lublinianka is relegated back to the third level. The U19 team wins bronze medal in Polish Championships
- 1961–1962 – Lublinianka loses the playoffs to the local rival, Motor Lublin
- 1963 – Kazimierz Górski becomes the manager of Lublinianka. The team wins promotion to the second division, to remain there until 1965
- 1969 – the U19 team wins silver in the Championship of Poland
- 1969–1970 – Lublinianka reaches the quarterfinals of the Polish Cup, to be eliminated by Górnik Zabrze (1–1 in Lublin, 2–5 in Zabrze)
- 1972–1973 – Lublinianka again reaches the quarterfinals of the Polish Cup, to be eliminated by Legia Warsaw (0–0, 1–5). In June 1973, Lublinianka returns to the second division, to be relegated after one year
- 1982–1983, 1994–1995, 1995–1996 – Lublinianka plays in the Second Division, to be relegated after one year

== Notable players ==
- (Poland) Zbigniew Stroniarz

== Sources ==
- History of Lublinianka, in Polish. Retrieved December 2, 2015
