= KS Cracovia =

Polish association football club

Cracovia
- Full name: Klub Sportowy Cracovia Spółka Akcyjna
- Nickname: Pasy (The Stripes)
- Founded: 13 June 1906; 120 years ago
- Ground: Józef Piłsudski Cracovia Stadium
- Capacity: 15,016
- Owner(s): Robert Platek (majority); Elżbieta Filipiak (minority)
- Chairman: vacant
- Head coach: Aleksandar Vuković
- League: Ekstraklasa
- 2025–26: Ekstraklasa, 13th of 18
- Website: https://cracovia.pl
Home colours	Away colours	Third colours

Klub Sportowy Cracovia Spółka Akcyjna, commonly referred to as Cracovia (Polish pronunciation: [kraˈkɔvja]), is a Polish professional football club based in Kraków. The club is five-time Polish champion, besides being the inaugural Polish champion, winner of the Polish Cup and the Polish Super Cup in 2020. Founded in 1906, Cracovia is the oldest Polish club still in existence. They play in the Ekstraklasa, the top tier of the national football league system.

== History ==
=== Beginning ===
The early years of football in the city of Kraków are associated with professor Henryk Jordan. He was a Polish physician who had spent some time in Britain and after coming back to his native city introduced football to its youth. Jordan was a huge supporter of all sports and gymnastics. On 12 March 1889, he founded The Park of Games and Plays in Kraków, which was commonly called Jordan's Park. Places like this later spread all across Austrian Galicia, and apart from gymnastics, the youth there became acquainted with football.

However, it was not Kraków where the first football game with Polish participation took place. This happened in Lwów on 14 July 1894, with a six-minute match between the teams of Lwów and Kraków. The home team proved better, winning 1–0 through a goal by Włodzimierz Chomicki.

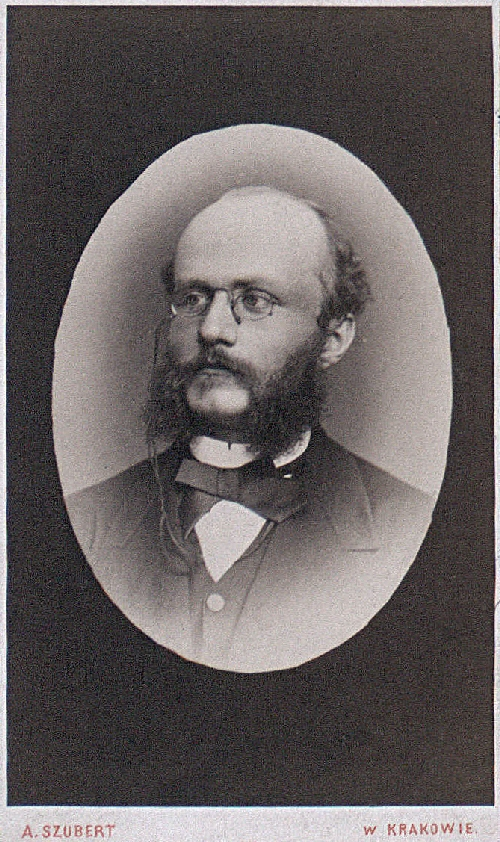
Henryk Jordan, 1875 by Awit Szubert

Within the next few years, football slowly emerged as a rising sport. It was especially popular among high school students and in the fall of 1903, a group of them created the team of Sława Lwów (the name was later changed to Czarni Lwów), the first Polish football club. In 1904, a group of Lwów's students, together with professor Eugeniusz Piasecki, came to Kraków to play an exhibition match. The match ended in Lwów's 0–4 defeat, and its far-reaching implications among Kraków's youth were enormous.

13 June 1906 is regarded as a crucial date in the history of football in Kraków. On that day, two matches of high school teams took place. These matches had been announced in Kraków's newspapers. Czarni Lwów beat the team of White-reds (Biało-czerwoni) and the IV Gymnasium beat Akademicy. The matches were warmly welcomed by Kraków's fans, who were surprised to see for the first time real football gear, brought by players from Lwów. 13 June is also regarded as the day of Cracovia's creation.

In the fall of 1906, another tournament took place, in which as many as 16 teams participated. Immediately prior to the matches, Jerzy Lustgarten from the team of Akademicy came up with the new name – Cracovia, which is a Latin name for Kraków. This was accepted and henceforth the new team's full name was Akademicki Klub Footballowy, Cracovia.

On 21 October 1906, the teams of Cracovia and "Biało-czerwoni" played each other, drawing 1–1. The next year, facing difficulties, those two teams decided to join forces, thus creating a stronger club, which took over the name Cracovia and white-red jerseys. The combined team went to Lwów on 1 July 1907, where they lost a game against Czarni, 1–4.

In 1908, an Englishman named William Calder came to Kraków. He was a teacher of English and a huge fan of football. It was in his apartment that the first club IDs and pinup badges were handed out. In May of that year, Cracovia for the first time ever faced a team from abroad. This was an ethnic German side, Troppauer Sportverein, from the Czech city of Opava.

In 1910, Cracovia's statutes were officially recognised by the Austrian government in Lwów and in the same year the club joined the Austrian Football Association, where it gained the proud title of the 1st class team. Kraków's side was very active internationally, often playing Czech, German and Austrian teams. However, it did not forget its roots, and it was due to Cracovia's initiative that the Polish Football Association (PZPN) was formed.

On 31 March 1912, after two years' efforts, Cracovia finally received its own pitch. The same year brought the debut of Józef Kałuża, one of Cracovia's most popular players, who at first had to use the nickname "Kowalski". The next year, Cracovia won the Championship of Austrian Galicia. However, in 1914, the matches were cancelled because of the outbreak of World War I.

=== Interwar period ===
In spite of the war, Cracovia's football team did not cease its activities, playing several games with such renowned teams as Admira Wacker Wien, Vasas and Wiener Sport-Club. In those years, new players emerged, such as defender Ludwik Gintel, midfielder Stanislaw Cikowski and forward Leon Sperling. All these footballers would become members of the Poland national team in the next few years, after Poland regained independence. Also, Cracovia's great play in games against some elite teams of Hungarian football (such as FTC Budapest and MTK Budapest) helped convince the Hungarians to invite Poland for an international friendly in 1921 (it should be mentioned that in this first historical match of Poland, there were seven Cracovia players in the starting lineup).

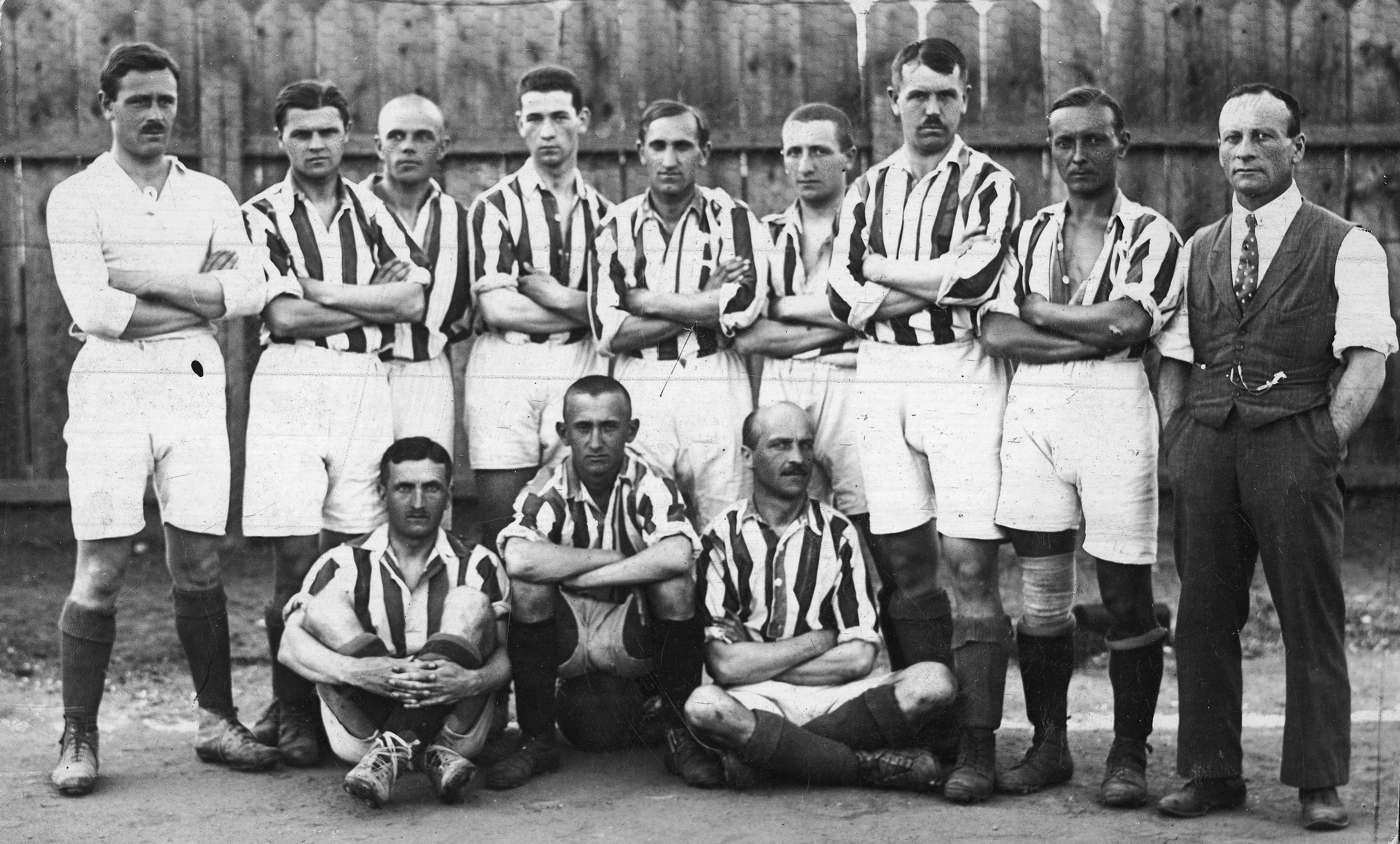
Team of Cracovia in 1921

In 1920, the budding PZPN was unable to carry out the championships of the whole country. The situation was insecure, Polish borders were not determined and Poland was waging several wars with its neighbours. Under the circumstances, the Kraków department of the PZPN organized its own matches; the tournament was won by Cracovia, ahead of Wisła Kraków. The next year, in the 1921 matches, Cracovia became the first, historic champion of Poland.

During the following years, the team often traveled across Europe, playing in Scandinavia, France and Spain. The most memorable is the trip to Spain, which occurred in the fall of 1923. Cracovia showed itself as a good side, drawing 1–1 with Barcelona, winning 3–2 against Sevilla and losing to the renowned teams of Real Madrid and Valencia

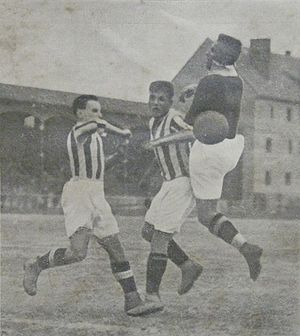
Friendly away game with Warta Poznań in 1924

In 1928, Cracovia joined the Polish Football League, which had been created a year earlier. Two years later, Kraków's side for the second time in its history became the Champion of Poland. This was repeated in 1932. At the end of the season, Cracovia placed ahead of such famous teams as Pogoń Lwów, Warta Poznań, Wisła Kraków and ŁKS Łódź. In 1934, the team was the vicechampion. However, next year, Cracovia was demoted from Ekstraklasa.

Cracovia's absence from the League lasted only one season. After beating Śmigły Wilno, AKS Chorzów and Brygada Częstochowa, the team returned. And the return was so successful that in their first season back (1937) Cracovia won the League, becoming the Champion for the fourth time.

=== World War II ===
During World War II, the German occupiers of Poland banned the Poles from officially playing any sports games. However, Cracovia, just like other teams from Kraków, participated in secret championships of the city, which were organised every year from 1940 to 1944. "Pasy" won only once – in 1943.

One of Cracovia's most famous players, Jozef Kałuża, who in the 1930s was the coach of the Poland national team, refused to take the post of manager of Nazi German-sponsored football events. Kałuża did not survive the war, as he died in 1944. Pre-war player of Cracovia Adam Kogut was among Poles murdered by the Russians in the large Katyn massacre in April–May 1940. On 28 January 1945, soon after liberation, the first official game between Wisła and Cracovia took place. Numerous spectators started by singing the Polish National Anthem. Later, on the snowy pitch, Wisła turned out to be the better side, winning 2–0.

=== Post-war period ===
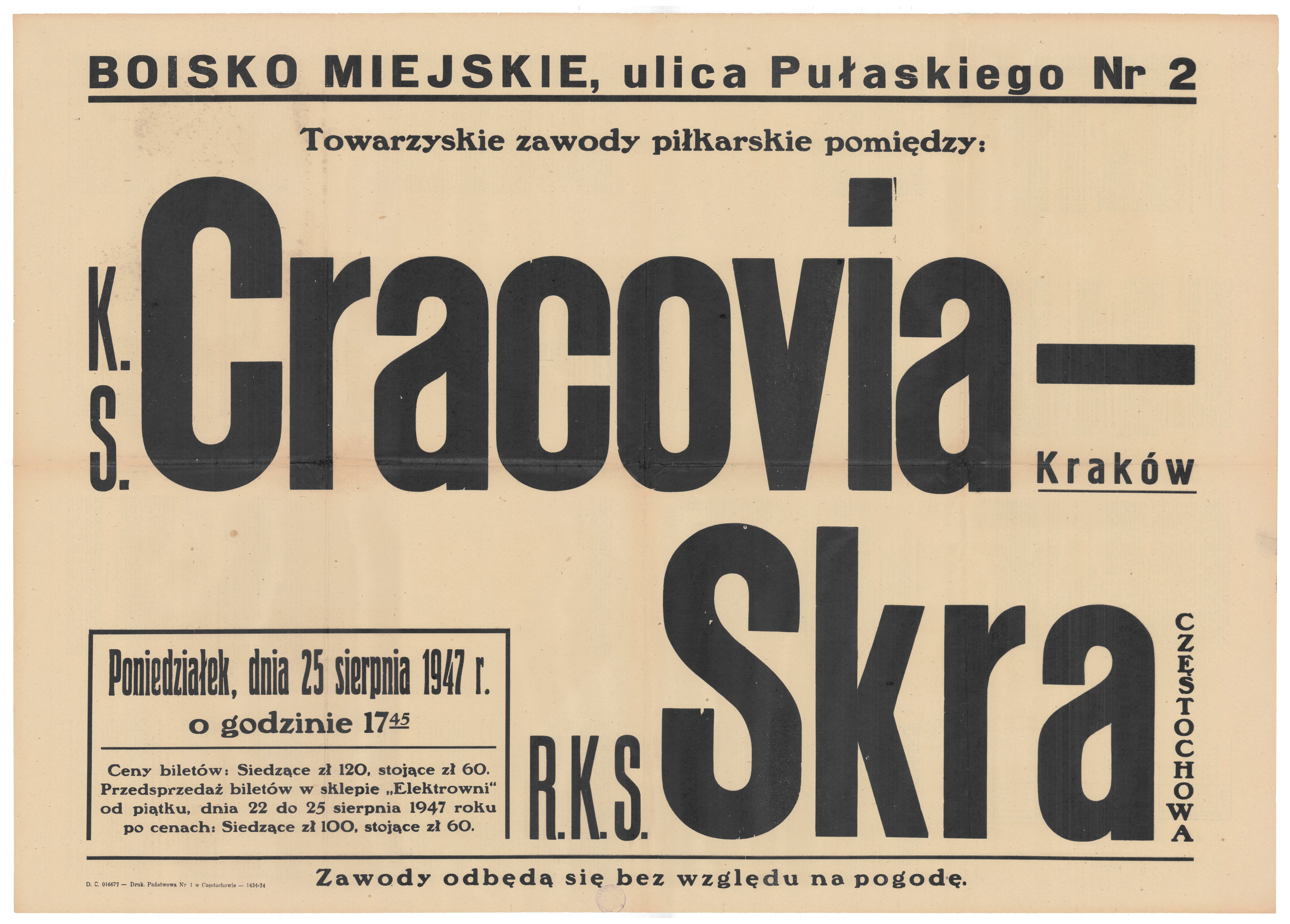
Poster advertising a friendly away game with Skra Częstochowa, 1947

In the years 1946 and 1947, Cracovia played numerous friendly internationals, as well as qualifiers for the Polish Championship. The team finished second in their group, thus not getting promoted to central playoffs.

However, in the Polish League's first postwar season (1948), Cracovia, together with Wisła Kraków, were the leading teams. After a fierce competition, both sides were level at first place. Under the circumstances, a third, decisive game was necessary. There, Cracovia proved its quality, winning 3–1, with the game taking place in December 1948. This was their fifth, and most recent, championship.

The following years were marked by Cracovia's slow decline. The last success – vice-championship of Poland (1949) – was then followed by the team's worsening position, which culminated in 1954, when Cracovia was demoted to the second division. An ill-considered policy of Cracovia's decision-makers should be blamed for the failures. The club was tied to Kraków's Transit Authority, which turned out to be a very bad solution, as it did not bring sufficient funds to make running the club feasible.

Between 1947 and 1954, ten of Cracovia's players were members of the Poland national team. These were: Władysław Gędłek, Tadeusz Parpan, Henryk Bobula, Tadeusz Glimas, Edward Jabłoński and Czesław Rataj.

=== Communist era ===
These years were full of ups and downs for Cracovia. Most of the time the team played in the Second Division, winning promotion on several occasions, only to be demoted after a year or two (promotions took place in 1961, 1966 and 1969). In 1959, the junior team won the Championships of Poland. Some of Cracovia's players got the chance to represent Poland (Andrzej Rewilak, Krzysztof Hausner), but glory years were over. Sometimes, the side achieved some good scores in friendly games (1–1 against Partizan in 1966 or 3–2 against Dinamo Minsk in 1963). In 1963, a sad incident occurred. Cracovia's wooden stands burned down, so the team had to play its home games on either Wawel Kraków's or Wisła's turf.

The years described were by far the worst period in the history of Cracovia's football department. In 1969, the team again was promoted to the First League, and demoted after one year. Then, demotions came one after the other – to the Second, Third and finally – to the Fourth, regional league. It was a shock, as never before had Cracovia been so low.

The team quickly scrambled itself out of the regional league, however, anchoring in the Third Division. This level was not satisfying for the five-time champions of Poland, so Cracovia tried hard to get higher, but it was not easy. In 1975, 20,000 fans watched a lost game against Lublinianka. In 1976, they were second (after Hutnik Kraków). In 1977, at home, Cracovia had to beat Resovia to win promotion. The match ended in a tie and thus Resovia got promoted.

Finally, Kraków's team placed first in 1978 and returned to the Second Division. Then, on 30 May 1982, all Cracovia's fans were overcome with joy. After 13 long years, their side returned to the First Division. However, the happiness did not last long – only two years. After this interval, Cracovia was demoted firstly to the Second, then to the Third Division. While in the First Division, Kraków's side won some important games (3–1 with Legia Warsaw and 1–0 with the champion – Lech Poznań), but this was not enough.

The second half of the 1980s was marked by a total decline. Cracovia was in the Third Division; its team never qualified higher. Because there were no sponsors, all the good players were en masse leaving the organisation to different, richer clubs. Celebrations of Cracovia's 80th anniversary (1986) were sad and prospects for the future were dim.

=== Changing times ===
The years 1986–1990 were stagnant, with Cracovia having been unable to get itself out of the 3rd Division, group VIII. The team was most of the time in the upper part of the table, but never won the league. In 1990 and 1991 Cracovia's junior team twice became the Champion of Poland and with a group of young, talented players (such as Tomasz Rząsa and Lukasz Kubik) supporters hoped for better times.

In June 1991, after beating Radomiak Radom in the playoffs, Cracovia finally won promotion, only to be demoted back to the 3rd Division after one year. Another promotion took place in the summer of 1995. Then, Cracovia for the first time in years faced its main rival, Wisła Kraków, beating it 1–0 in an away game (September 1995), on a goal by Krzysztof Duda. This time, Cracovia survived three seasons in the 2nd Division, but in June 1998 it was again relegated back to the 3rd League.

In mid-2002, due to the efforts of numerous, faithful supporters, Cracovia attracted a rich sponsor, Comarch, owned by professor Janusz Filipiak. This meant that finally there was money for development. Several players were purchased, such as Piotr Giza, Arkadiusz Baran, Łukasz Skrzyński and Paweł Nowak. Under new head coach Wojciech Stawowy, promotion came fast – in the fall of 2003, Cracovia returned to the Second Division.

=== Today ===
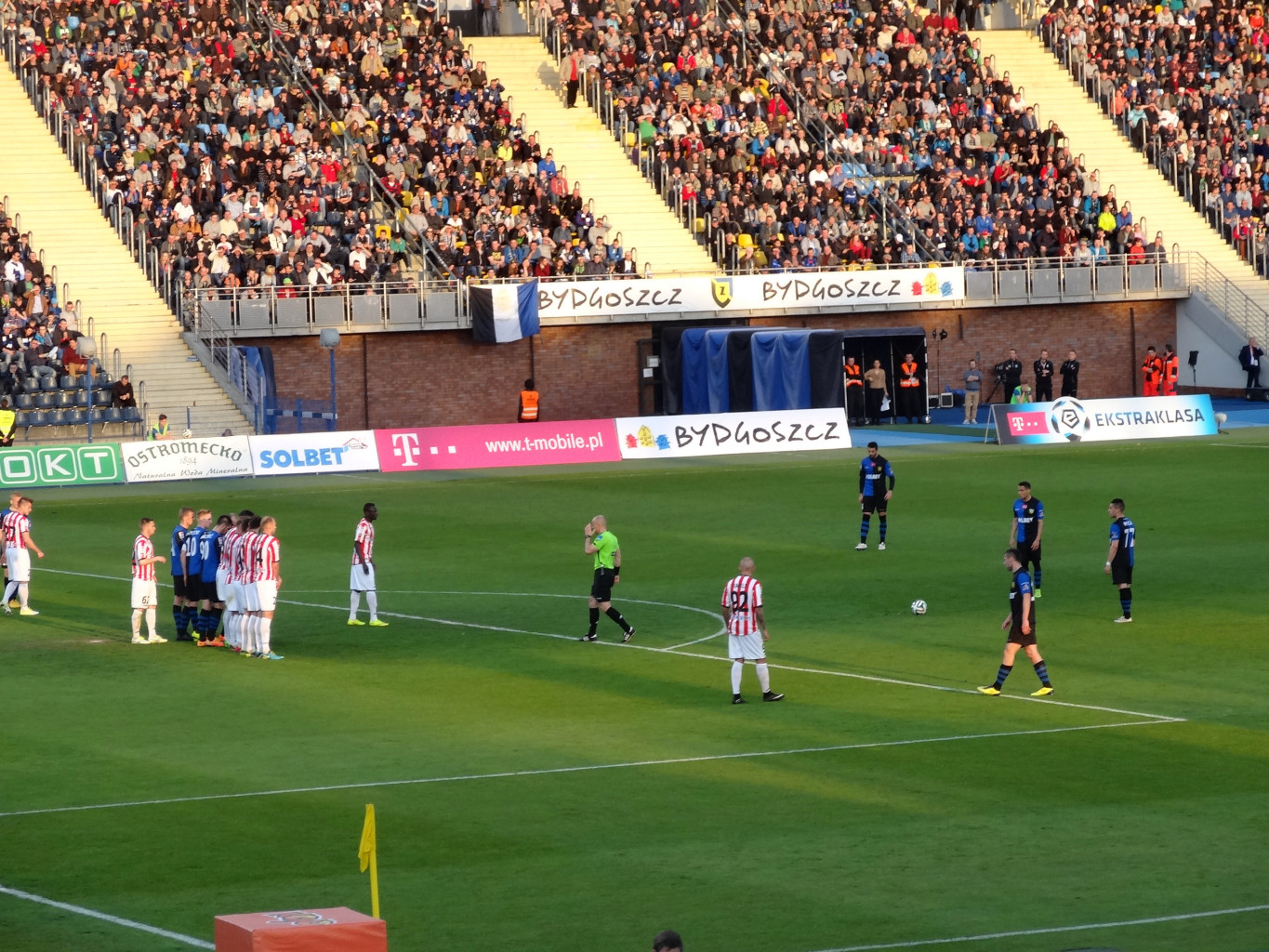
Away game with Zawisza Bydgoszcz played in the 2014–15 Ekstraklasa

After promotion, Cracovia spent only one year in the Second Division. The team, with Kazimierz Węgrzyn, Piotr Giza and Marcin Bojarski, finished the 2003–04 season in third position, but after routing Górnik Polkowice in the playoffs, Cracovia returned to the top flight.

The newly promoted side had a successful 2004–05 season, being in contention for a UEFA Cup place until finally finishing in fifth place. A ninth-place finish followed in 2005–06. The 2006–07 season was their best since the early 1950s. Cracovia, under coach Stefan Majewski, finished fourth overall, behind Zagłębie Lubin, GKS Bełchatów and Legia Warsaw.

Cracovia finished the 2007–08 Ekstraklasa season in seventh place, but due to a match-fixing scandal resulting in relegation of such teams as Zagłębie Lubin and Korona Kielce, the team unexpectedly was offered a spot in the Intertoto Cup. However, Cracovia were quickly defeated in the first round by Belarusian side Shakhtyor Soligorsk, 5–1 on aggregate.

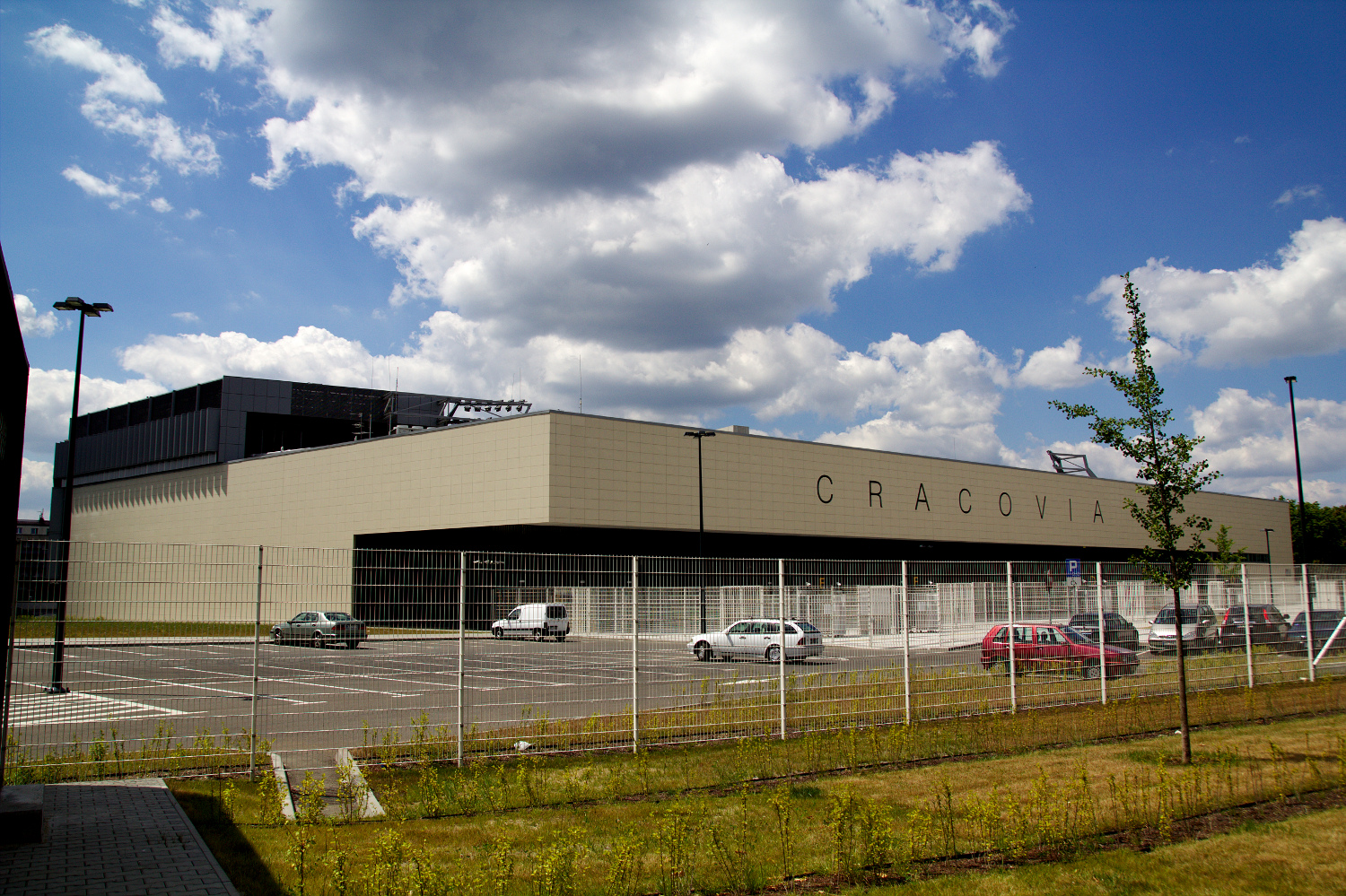
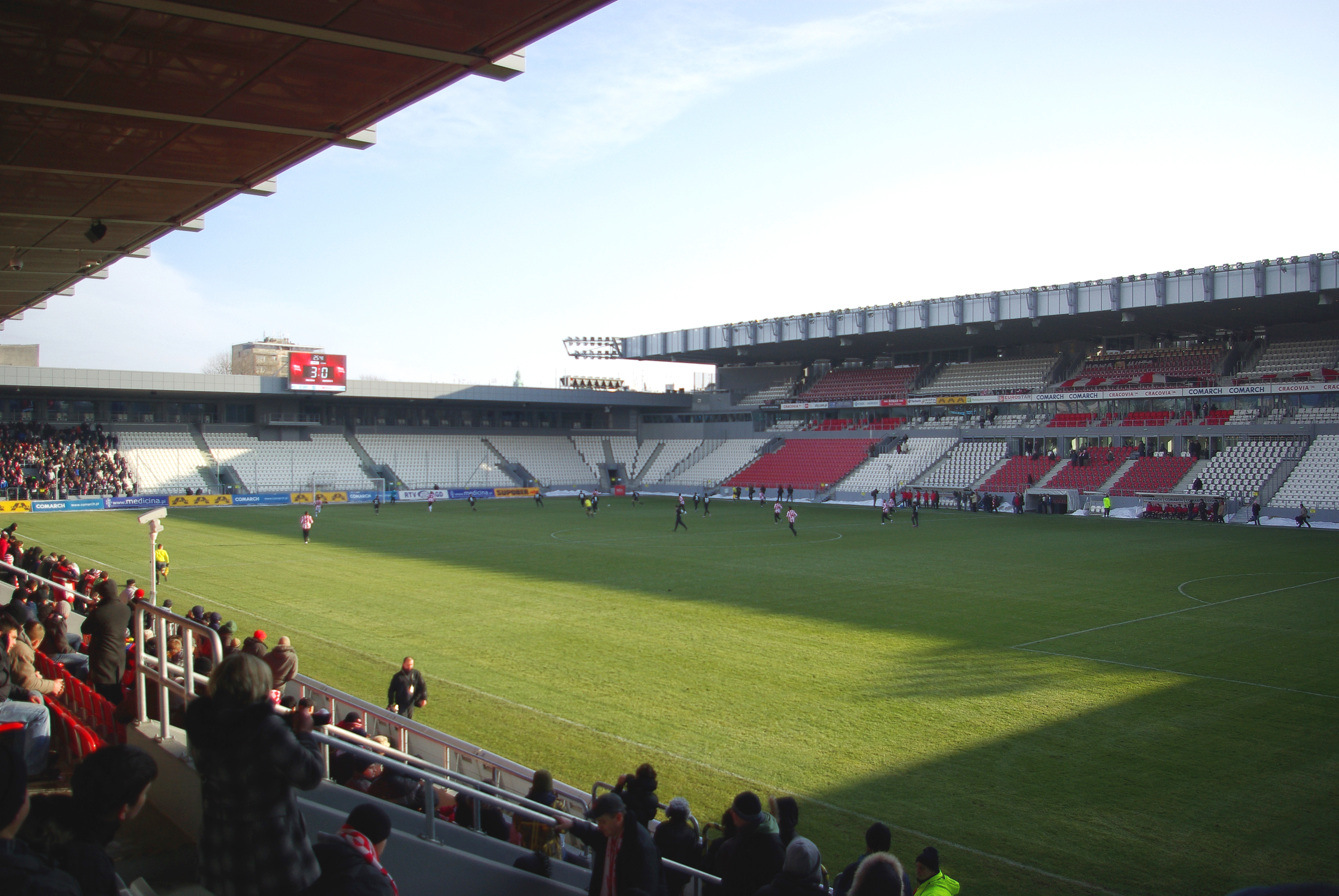
Józef Piłsudski Cracovia Stadium

At the end of 2008–09 Ekstraklasa season, Cracovia was 15th (out of 16 clubs) in the league table, which normally would result in its relegation to I liga. However, ŁKS Łódź, who finished 7th, were not granted the licence to play in the Ekstraklasa for the following season; Cracovia eventually took the 14th place in the table and remained in the Ekstraklasa. They also narrowly avoided relegation after the 2010–11 season, but finished last in the 2011–12 season and was relegated to the 2012–13 I liga. They earned promotion back to the Ekstraklasa in 2013 after defeating Miedź Legnica 3–1 on 8 June 2013.

Since December 2009, Cracovia cooperates with 1860 Munich. On 24 July 2020, Cracovia lifted the Polish Cup for the first time, their first national honour in 73 years. On 9 October 2020, Cracovia was victorious in the 2020 Polish Super Cup.

== Honours ==
=== League ===
- Polish Football Championship/Ekstraklasa
  - Champions: 1921, 1930, 1932, 1937, 1948
  - Runners-up: 1934, 1949
- Galician Football Championship
  - Champions: 1913

=== Cup ===
- Polish Cup
  - Winners: 2019–20
- Polish Super Cup
  - Winners: 2020

=== Youth teams ===
- Polish U-19 Championship
  - Champions: 1959, 1990, 1991
  - Runners-up: 1966, 2014, 2018
- Polish U-17 Championship
  - Champions: 2006

== Cracovia in Europe ==
Season	Competition	Round	Opponent	Home	Away	Agg
1983	UEFA Intertoto Cup	GR	(Hungary) Videoton	1–3	0–6	3rd
1983	UEFA Intertoto Cup	GR	(Czech Republic) Hvězda Cheb	0–2	0–2	3rd
1983	UEFA Intertoto Cup	GR	(Austria) Sturm Graz	1–1	2–0	3rd
2008	UEFA Intertoto Cup	1R	(Belarus) Shakhtyor Soligorsk	1–2	0–3	1–5
2016–17	UEFA Europa League	1QR	(North Macedonia) Shkëndija	1–2	0–2	1–4
2019–20	UEFA Europa League	1QR	(Slovakia) Dunajská Streda	2–2 (a.e.t)	1–1	3–3 (a)
2020–21	UEFA Europa League	1QR	(Sweden) Malmö FF	—N/a	0–2	—N/a

== Supporters and rivalries ==
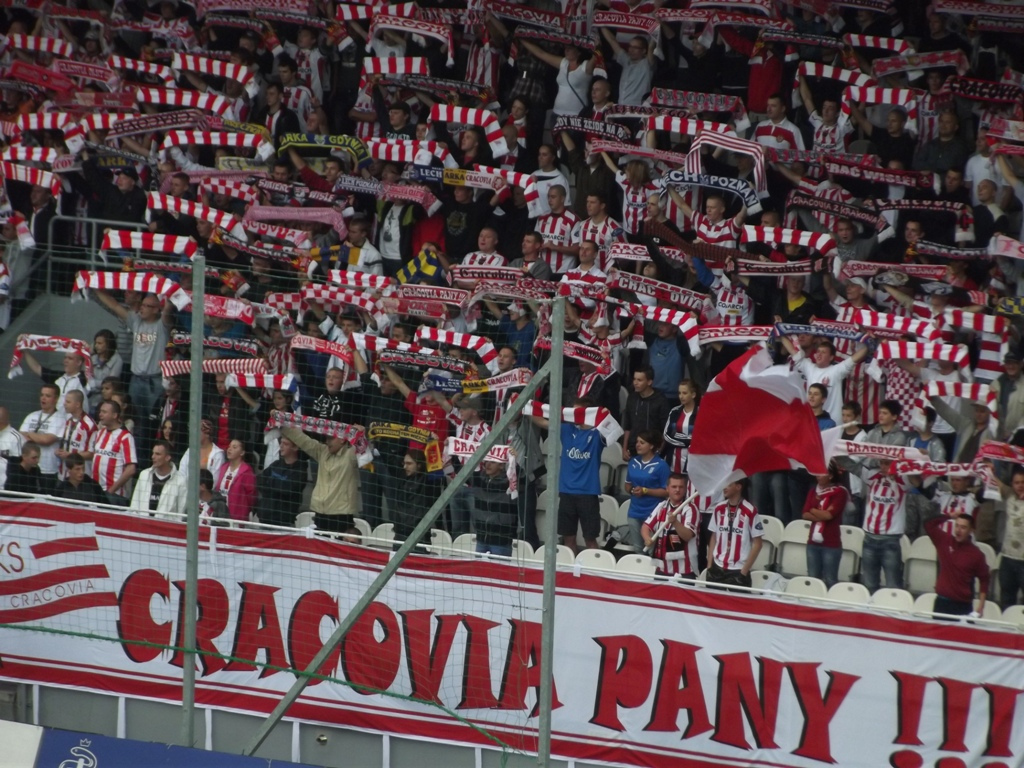
Cracovia fans

Cracovia has traditionally one of the largest fan-bases in the country, and draws most of its support from Kraków and the Lesser Poland region.

=== Groups ===
The fans have 19 official fan clubs outside the city: Wieliczka, Niepołomice, Muszyna, Proszowice, Skawina, Przemyśl, Jarosław, Miechów, Sucha Beskidzka, Krzeszowice, Trzebinia, Andrychów, Niedźwiedź, Oświęcim, Zakopane, Libiąż, Biała Podlaska, Radom, Rzeszów.

The fans have one ultras group, Opravcy; and two hooligan groups, Anti-Wisła and Jude Gang.

=== Friendships ===
Cracovia fans have friendships with Arka Gdynia and Lech Poznań, the three commonly known as Wielka Triada ("The Great Triad"). They also have friendships with fans of Sandecja Nowy Sącz, GKS Tychy, Tarnovia Tarnów, and Ajax Amsterdam.

In the past the fans had friendships with fans of ŁKS Łódź, Polonia Bytom and Wisłoka Dębica (until 1990). In 2008 the fans announced the end of friendships with Korona Kielce, Czarni Jasło and Stal Mielec (all 3 maintain one between each other though to this day). In 2017 one of the oldest fan friendships ended, with fans of Polonia Warsaw, which had begun as far back as 1968, meaning it lasted 49 years.

=== Rivalries ===
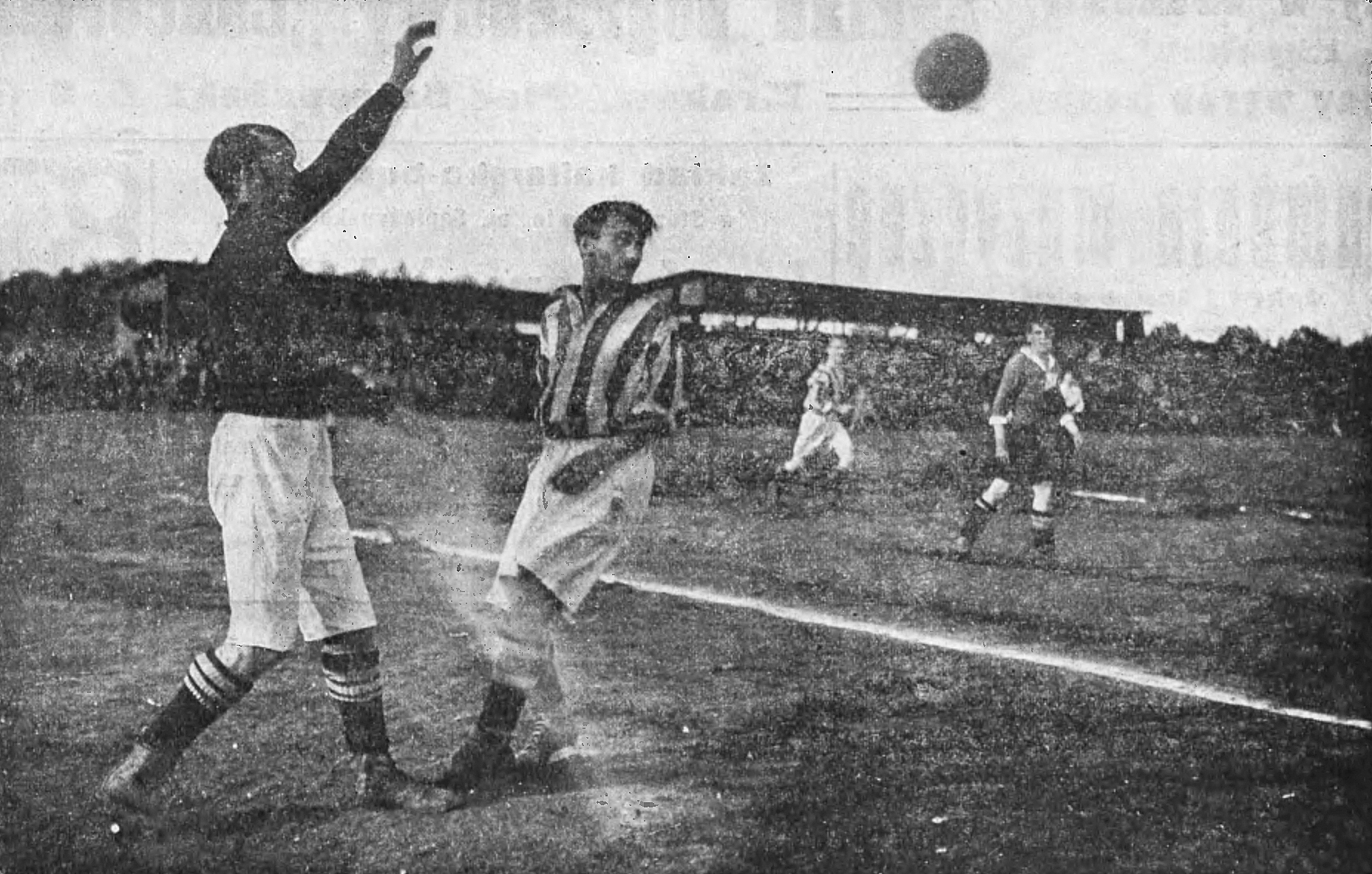
Derby match with Wisła Kraków in 1918

Cracovia's biggest rival is Wisła Kraków. When they play, it is known as the "Holy War", it is the oldest and in the past, frequently also the most violent derby in Poland, with notable riots and stabbings having taken place during matchdays, as well as continually around the housing estates of the city.

Apart from derby rivals Wisła, Cracovia also has a fierce rivalry with the third club in the city, Hutnik Nowa Huta. Other rivals include Legia Warsaw, Śląsk Wrocław, Ruch Chorzów, Zagłębie Sosnowiec, Pogoń Szczecin, Motor Lublin and Lechia Gdańsk.

=== Notable supporters ===
Across the years, Cracovia attracted several renowned names, who attended the games and publicly declared their support. Unquestionably, the most famous fan of the team was Karol Józef Wojtyła, who, even after having been named Pope John Paul II, would often ask visitors from Poland about Cracovia. As a continuing tribute, an image of the late pope hangs on a wall inside the Cracovia change room beneath a crucifix. Also, among other personalities who support the club, there are/were such persons, as Józef Piłsudski, Gustaw Holoubek, Jerzy Pilch, Kazimierz Wyka, Grzegorz Miecugow, Leszek Mazan, Jerzy Harasymowicz, Maciej Maleńczuk, Stefan Friedmann and Nigel Kennedy.

== Players ==
=== Current squad ===
As of 15 September 2026

Note: Flags indicate national team as defined under FIFA eligibility rules; some limited exceptions apply. Players may hold more than one non-FIFA nationality.

No.	Pos.	Nation	Player
4	DF	SWE	Gustav Henriksson
5	MF	SLO	Beno Selan
6	MF	IRQ	Amir Al-Ammari
7	MF	POL	Mateusz Praszelik
9	FW	POL	Wiktor Bogacz (on loan from New York Red Bulls)
10	MF	POL	Filip Marchwiński (on loan from Lecce)
11	FW	NOR	Lasse Nordås (on loan from Luton Town)
13	GK	POL	Sebastian Madejski
14	MF	BIH	Ajdin Hasić
15	DF	POL	Kamil Glik
17	FW	BUL	Martin Minchev
18	FW	USA	Kahveh Zahiroleslam
19	MF	POL	Mateusz Tabisz
20	MF	POL	Karol Knap
21	FW	POL	Kacper Śmiglewski
22	DF	AUT	Dominik Baumgartner
25	MF	GEO	Otar Kakabadze (captain)

No.	Pos.	Nation	Player
27	FW	ERI	Siem Eyob-Abraha
28	MF	BEL	Vincent Burlet
29	MF	POL	Wiktor Dej
33	GK	POL	Konrad Cymerys
38	MF	WAL	Alex Marciniak
39	DF	CRO	Mauro Perković
43	MF	POL	Mateusz Klich
47	MF	TUN	Sayfallah Ltaief
61	DF	FRA	Brahim Traoré
70	MF	AUT	Dijon Kameri
77	GK	POL	Jakub Chrapusta
79	DF	POL	Dominik Piła
90	MF	BEL	Mohamed Berte
91	GK	POL	Aleksander Bobek
92	MF	POL	Mateusz Skoczylas
99	DF	POL	Jakub Wilczek

=== Out on loan ===
Note: Flags indicate national team as defined under FIFA eligibility rules; some limited exceptions apply. Players may hold more than one non-FIFA nationality.

No.	Pos.	Nation	Player
23	GK	SVK	Henrich Ravas (at Polonia Warsaw until 30 June 2027)
—	FW	CMR	Jean Batoum (at Nyíregyháza until 30 June 2027)

No.	Pos.	Nation	Player
—	MF	POL	Bartosz Biedrzycki (at Odra Opole until 30 June 2027)
—	GK	POL	Konrad Golonka (at AKS 1947 Busko-Zdrój until 30 June 2027)

=== Retired numbers ===
- 1 – (Poland) Pope John Paul II. Number retired on 4 January 2005 during Pope's private audience with the players and staff of Cracovia in Vatican City.

=== Notable players ===
Notable Polish players

- (Poland) Antoni Amirowicz
- (Poland) Tomasz Baliga
- (Poland) Piotr Bania
- (Poland) Arkadiusz Baran
- (Poland) Marcin Bojarski
- (Poland) Marcin Cabaj
- (Poland) Radosław Cierzniak
- (Poland) Józef Ciszewski
- (Poland) Marek Citko
- (Poland) Damian Dąbrowski
- (Poland) Władysław Gędłek
- (Poland) Ludwik Gintel
- (Poland) Piotr Giza
- (Poland) Kamil Glik
- (Poland) Michał Gliwa
- (Poland) Janusz Gol
- (Poland) Wilhelm Góra
- (Poland) Krzysztof Hausner
- (Poland) Michał Helik
- (Poland) Edward Jabłoński
- (Poland) Paweł Jaroszyński
- (Poland) Aleksander Kahane
- (Poland) Józef Kałuża
- (Poland) Bartosz Kapustka
- (Poland) Mateusz Klich
- (Poland) Józef Korbas
- (Poland) Jakub Kosecki
- (Poland) Karol Kossok
- (Poland) Janusz Kowalik
- (Poland) Filip Marchwiński
- (Poland) Maciej Murawski
- (Poland) Aleksander Mysiak
- (Poland) Andrzej Niedzielan
- (Poland) Tadeusz Parpan
- (Poland) Krzysztof Piątek
- (Poland) Marek Podsiadło
- (Poland) Czesław Rajtar
- (Poland) Filip Rózga
- (Poland) Stanisław Różankowski
- (Poland) Tomasz Rząsa
- (Poland) Grzegorz Sandomierski
- (Poland) Leon Sperling
- (Poland) Zbigniew Stroniarz
- (Poland) Andrzej Turecki
- (Poland) Kazimierz Węgrzyn
- (Poland) Hubert Wołąkiewicz
- (Poland) Oskar Wójcik
- (Poland) Rafał Wrześniak

Notable foreign players

- (Albania) Eneo Bitri
- (Bosnia and Herzegovina) Ajdin Hasić
- (Bosnia and Herzegovina) Vule Trivunović
- (Bulgaria) Martin Minchev
- (Burundi) Saidi Ntibazonkiza
- (Cameroon) Jean Batoum
- (Republic of the Congo) Gabriel Charpentier
- (Czech Republic) Jakub Jugas
- (Estonia) Sergei Zenjov
- (Eritrea) Siem Eyob-Abraha
- (Finland) Arttu Hoskonen
- (Finland) Benjamin Källman
- (Georgia (country)) Otar Kakabadze
- (Hungary) Árpád Majoros
- (Iceland) Davíð Kristján Ólafsson
- (Iraq) Amir Al-Ammari
- (Kosovo) Florian Loshaj
- (Kyrgyzstan) Edgar Bernhardt
- (Latvia) Deniss Rakels
- (Latvia) Aleksejs Višņakovs
- (Lithuania) Deivydas Matulevičius
- (Moldova) Gheorghe Ovseanicov
- (Moldova) Alexandru Suvorov
- (Montenegro) Vladimir Boljević
- (North Macedonia) Jani Atanasov
- (Romania) Virgil Ghiță
- (Romania) Sergiu Hanca
- (Romania) Cornel Râpă
- (Senegal) Boubacar Dialiba
- (Serbia) Miloš Kosanović
- (Slovakia) Erik Jendrišek
- (Slovenia) Andraž Struna
- (Tunisia) Sayfallah Ltaief
- (Ukraine) Yevhen Konoplyanka

== Notable head coaches ==
- (Hungary) Imre Pozsonyi (1921-ca. 1923)
- (Poland) Michał Matyas (1959–61), (1968–69), (1972–73)
- (Poland) Andrzej Bahr (interim) (14 September 1991), (1 July 1993 – 30 June 1994), (19 June 2000 – 6 August 2001)
- (Poland) Mirosław Hajdo (20 May 2002 – 30 June 2002)
- (Poland) Wojciech Stawowy (1 July 2002 – 15 February 2006)
- (Poland) Albin Mikulski (1 January 2006 – 9 May 2006)
- (Poland) Stefan Białas (10 May 2006 – 2 October 2006)
- (Poland) Stefan Majewski (2 October 2006 – 26 October 2008)
- (Poland) Artur Płatek (27 October 2008 – 12 August 2009)
- (Poland) Orest Lenczyk (12 August 2009 – 24 May 2010)
- (Poland) Rafał Ulatowski (28 May 2010 – 27 October 2010)
- (Poland) Marcin Sadko (interim) (28 October 2010 – 31 October 2010)
- (Russia) (Ukraine) (Poland) Yuriy Shatalov (31 October 2010 – 22 September 2011)
- (Poland) Dariusz Pasieka (22 September 2011 – 5 March 2012)
- (Poland) Tomasz Kafarski (6 March 2012 – 11 June 2012)
- (Poland) Wojciech Stawowy (11 June 2012 – 12 May 2014)
- (Poland) Mirosław Hajdo (13 May 2014 – 30 June 2014)
- (Poland) Robert Podoliński (30 June 2014 – 19 April 2015)
- (Poland) Jacek Zieliński (20 April 2015 – 19 June 2017)
- (Poland) Michał Probierz (21 June 2017 – 9 November 2021)
- (Poland) Jacek Zieliński (10 November 2021 – 5 April 2024)
- (Poland) Dawid Kroczek (5 April 2024 – 15 May 2025)
- (Slovenia) Luka Elsner (4 June 2025 – 20 April 2026)
- (Sweden) (Poland) Bartosz Grzelak (20 April 2026 – 8 November 2026)
- (Serbia) (Poland) Aleksandar Vuković (11 November 2026 – present)

=== Other managers ===
- (Hungary) Jesza Poszony (1921–23)
- (England) Sid Kimpton (1923)
- (Poland) Józef Kałuża (1927–28)
- (Austria) Viktor Hierländer (1929–31)
- (Poland) Karol Kossok (1936)
- (Hungary) Franz Platko (1938)
- (Poland) Tadeusz Parpan (1954)
- (Czechoslovakia) Karel Finek (1956–57), (1961)
- (Poland) Edward Jabłoński (1958)
- (Poland) Artur Woźniak (1971–72)
- (Poland) Antoni Szymanowski (1985–86)
- (Poland) Zdzisław Podedworny (1991)
- (Poland) Alojzy Łysko (1996–97)

== Cracovia II ==
Cracovia II
- Full name: Miejski Klub Sportowy Cracovia II
- Nickname: Pasy (The Stripes)
- Ground: Cracovia Training Center, Rączna
- Manager: Andrzej Paszkiewicz
- League: IV liga Lesser Poland
- 2025–26: III liga, group IV, 16th of 18 (relegated)
- Website: http://www.cracovia.pl/pilka-nozna/
Home colours	Away colours

Cracovia II (Polish pronunciation: [kraˈkɔvʲa]) is a Polish football team, which serves as the reserve side of Cracovia. They compete in the IV liga Lesser Poland after being relegated from the III liga in the 2025–26 season.

== See also ==
- Football in Poland
- Polish Championship in Football
- Polish football in the interwar period
- Polish Football League (1927–1939)
- Comarch
- Jutrzenka Kraków
