= 1969–70 European Cup Winners' Cup =

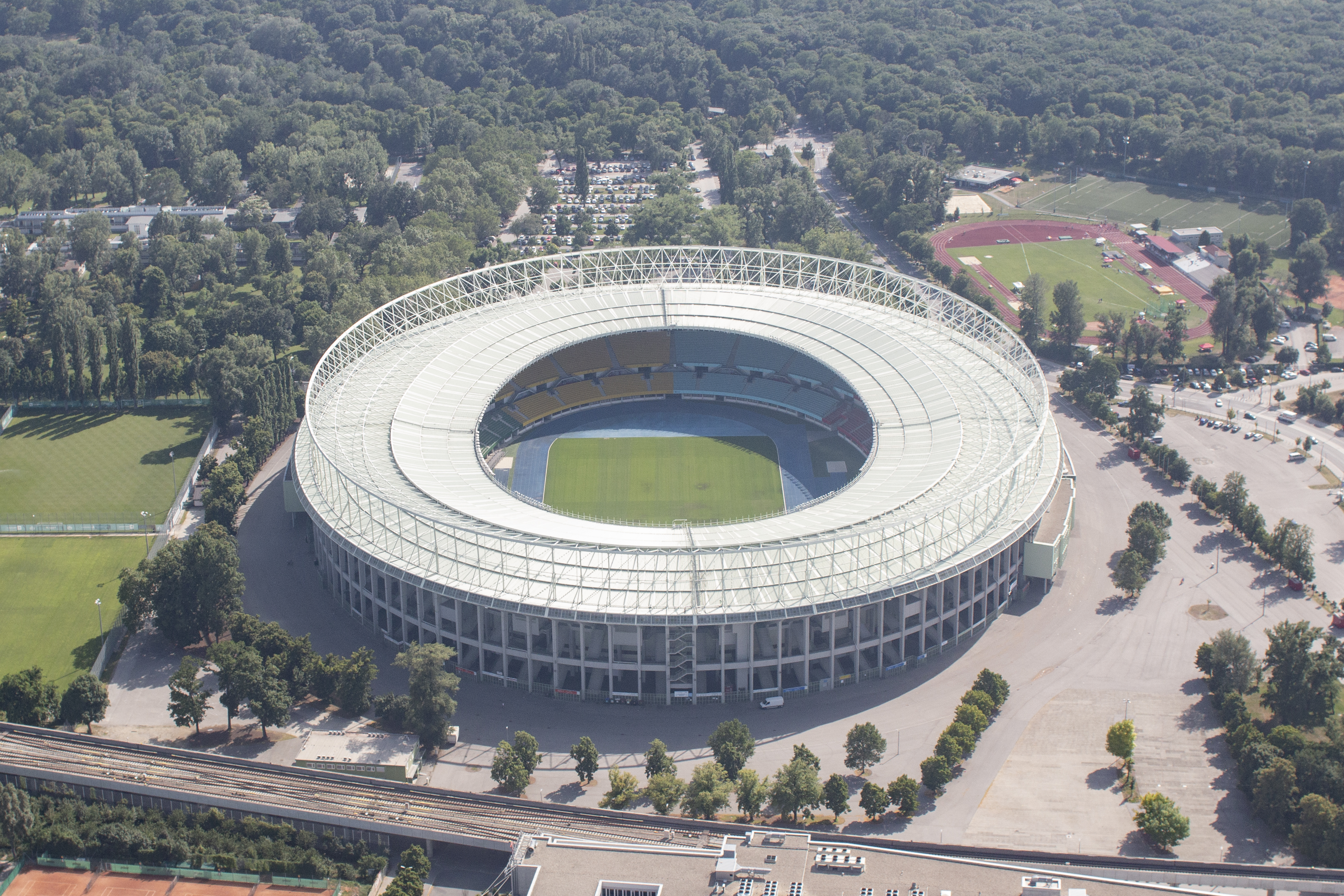
- The Praterstadion in Vienna hosted the final

Tournament details
- Dates: 28 August 1969 - 29 April 1970
- Teams: 33

Final positions
- Champions: (England) Manchester City (1st title)
- Runners-up: (Poland) Górnik Zabrze

Tournament statistics
- Matches played: 64
- Goals scored: 173 (2.7 per match)
- Top scorer(s): Włodzimierz Lubański (Górnik Zabrze); 7 goals

The 1969–70 season of the European Cup Winners' Cup was the 10th edition of European football's secondary competition. Defending champions Slovan Bratislava were eliminated in the First Round by Dinamo Zagreb. English club Manchester City defeated Polish club Górnik Zabrze 2–1 in the final for their first and only Cup Winners' Cup title. The result was City's lone European triumph for more than 50 years, until their victory in the 2022–23 UEFA Champions League.

== Teams ==
(Austria) SK Rapid Wien (CW)	(Belgium) Lierse (CW)	(Bulgaria) Levski-Spartak (CR)	(Cyprus) APOEL (CW)
(Czechoslovakia) Dukla Prague (CW)	(Czechoslovakia) Slovan Bratislava (2nd)^{TH}	(Denmark) Frem (CR)	(England) Manchester City (CW)
(Finland) KuPS (CW)	(France) Marseille (CW)	(East Germany) 1. FC Magdeburg (CW)	(West Germany) Schalke 04 (CR)
(Greece) Olympiacos (CR)	(Hungary) MTK Hungária (CW)	(Iceland) ÍBV (CW)	(Republic of Ireland) Shamrock Rovers (CW)
(Italy) Roma (CW)	Union Luxembourg (CW)	(Malta) Sliema Wanderers (CW)	(Netherlands) PSV Eindhoven (CR)
(Northern Ireland) Ards (CW)	(Norway) Mjøndalen (CR)	(Poland) Górnik Zabrze (CW)	(Portugal) Académica (CR)
(Romania) Steaua București (CW)	(Scotland) Rangers (CR)	(Spain) Athletic Bilbao (CW)	(Sweden) IFK Norrköping (CW)
(Switzerland) St. Gallen (CW)	(Turkey) Göztepe (CW)	(Soviet Union) Torpedo Moscow (CW)	(Wales) Cardiff City (CW)
(Socialist Federal Republic of Yugoslavia) Dinamo Zagreb (CW)

== Preliminary round ==
Team 1	Agg.	Team 2	1st leg	2nd leg
SK Rapid Wien (Austria)	1–1 (a)	(Soviet Union) Torpedo Moscow	0–0	1–1

=== First leg ===
28 August 1969

SK Rapid Wien (Austria)	0–0	(Soviet Union) Torpedo Moscow

Praterstadion, Vienna
Attendance: 20,000
Referee: Laurens van Ravens (Netherlands)

=== Second leg ===
3 September 1969

Torpedo Moscow (Soviet Union)	1–1	(Austria) SK Rapid Wien
Gershkovich 53'		Redl 88'

Luzhniki Stadium, Moscow
Attendance: 80,000
Referee: Antonio Sbardella (Italy)

1–1 on aggregate, Rapid Wien won on away goals.

== Bracket ==
First round
(Czechoslovakia) Dukla Prague	1	0	1
(France) Marseille (aet)	0	2	2
(Socialist Federal Republic of Yugoslavia) Dinamo Zagreb	3	0	3
(Czechoslovakia) Slovan Bratislava	0	0	0
(Sweden) IFK Norrköping	5	0	5
(Malta) Sliema Wanderers	1	1	2
(Republic of Ireland) Shamrock Rovers	2	0	2
(West Germany) Schalke 04	1	3	4
(East Germany) 1. FC Magdeburg (aet)	1	1	2
(Hungary) MTK Hungária	0	1	1
(Portugal) Académica	0	1	1
(Finland) KuPS	0	0	0
(Belgium) Lierse	10	1	11
(Cyprus) APOEL	1	0	1
(Spain) Athletic Bilbao	3	0	3
(England) Manchester City	3	3	6
(Northern Ireland) Ards	0	1	1
(Italy) Roma	0	3	3
(Austria) SK Rapid Wien	1	2	3
(Netherlands) PSV Eindhoven	2	4	6
(Turkey) Göztepe	3	3	6
Union Luxembourg	0	2	2
(Norway) Mjøndalen	1	1	2
(Wales) Cardiff City	7	5	12
(Iceland) ÍBV	0	0	0
(Bulgaria) Levski-Spartak	4	4	8
(Denmark) Frem	2	0	2
(Switzerland) St. Gallen (a)	1	1	2
(Greece) Olympiacos	2	0	2
(Poland) Górnik Zabrze	2	5	7
(Scotland) Rangers	2	0	2
(Romania) Steaua București	0	0	0

Second round
(France) Marseille	1	0	1
(Socialist Federal Republic of Yugoslavia) Dinamo Zagreb	1	2	3
(Sweden) IFK Norrköping	0	0	0
(West Germany) Schalke 04	0	1	1
(East Germany) 1. FC Magdeburg	1	0	1
(Portugal) Académica	0	2	2
(Belgium) Lierse	0	0	0
(England) Manchester City	3	5	8
(Italy) Roma (c)	1	0	1
(Netherlands) PSV Eindhoven	0	1	1
(Turkey) Göztepe	3	0	3
(Wales) Cardiff City	0	1	1
(Bulgaria) Levski-Spartak	4	0	4
(Switzerland) St. Gallen	0	0	0
(Poland) Górnik Zabrze	3	3	6
(Scotland) Rangers	1	1	2

Quarter-finals
(Socialist Federal Republic of Yugoslavia) Dinamo Zagreb	1	0	1
(West Germany) Schalke 04	3	1	4
(Portugal) Académica	0	0	0
(England) Manchester City	0	1	1
(Italy) Roma	2	0	2
(Turkey) Göztepe	0	0	0
(Bulgaria) Levski-Spartak	3	1	4
(Poland) Górnik Zabrze (a)	2	2	4

Semi-finals
(West Germany) Schalke 04	1	1	2
(England) Manchester City	0	5	5
(Italy) Roma	1	2	3 (1)
(Poland) Górnik Zabrze (c)	1	2	3 (1)

Final
(England) Manchester City	2
(Poland) Górnik Zabrze	1

== First round ==
Team 1	Agg.	Team 2	1st leg	2nd leg
Dukla Prague (Czechoslovakia)	1–2	(France) Marseille	1–0	0–2 (aet)
Dinamo Zagreb (Socialist Federal Republic of Yugoslavia)	3–0	(Czechoslovakia) Slovan Bratislava	3–0	0–0
Norrköping (Sweden)	5–2	(Malta) Sliema Wanderers	5–1	0–1
Shamrock Rovers (Republic of Ireland)	2–4	(West Germany) Schalke 04	2–1	0–3
1. FC Magdeburg (East Germany)	2–1	(Hungary) MTK Hungária	1–0	1–1 (aet)
Académica (Portugal)	1–0	(Finland) KuPS	0–0	1–0
Lierse (Belgium)	11–1	(Cyprus) APOEL	10–1	1–0
Athletic Bilbao (Spain)	3–6	(England) Manchester City	3–3	0–3
Ards (Northern Ireland)	1–3	(Italy) Roma	0–0	1–3
Rapid Wien (Austria)	3–6	(Netherlands) PSV Eindhoven	1–2	2–4
Göztepe (Turkey)	6–2	Union Luxembourg	3–0	3–2
Mjøndalen (Norway)	2–12	(Wales) Cardiff City	1–7	1–5
ÍBV (Iceland)	0–8	(Bulgaria) Levski-Spartak	0–4	0–4
Frem (Denmark)	2–2 (a)	(Switzerland) St. Gallen	2–1	0–1
Olympiacos (Greece)	2–7	(Poland) Górnik Zabrze	2–2	0–5
Rangers (Scotland)	2–0	(Romania) Steaua București	2–0	0–0

=== First leg ===
17 September 1969

Dukla Prague (Czechoslovakia)	1–0	(France) Marseille
Hudec 33'

Stadion Letná, Prague
Referee: Rudolf Scheurer (Switzerland)

17 September 1969

Dinamo Zagreb (Socialist Federal Republic of Yugoslavia)	3–0	(Czechoslovakia) Slovan Bratislava
Miljković 2'; Novak 51'; Gucmirtl 58'

Stadion Maksimir, Zagreb
Referee: Antonio Saldanha (Portugal)

17 September 1969

IFK Norrköping (Sweden)	5–1	(Malta) Sliema Wanderers
Hultberg 9', 19'; Pressfeldt 38'; Norblad 58'; Jonsson 75'	Report	Bonett 65'

Idrottsparken, Norrköping
Attendance: 3,652
Referee: Magnús Pétursson (Iceland)

17 September 1969

Shamrock Rovers (Republic of Ireland)	2–1	(West Germany) Schalke 04
Barber 71', 72'		Pirkner 35'

Dalymount Park, Dublin
Referee: Carl Hansen (Denmark)

17 September 1969

1. FC Magdeburg (East Germany)	1–0	(Hungary) MTK Hungária
Sparwasser 30'

Ernst Grube Stadium, Magdeburg
Referee: William Anderson (Scotland)

17 September 1969

Académica (Portugal)	0–0	(Finland) KuPS

Estádio Municipal de Coimbra, Coimbra
Attendance: 6,742
Referee: Hans-Joachim Weyland (West Germany)

17 September 1969

Lierse (Belgium)	10–1	(Cyprus) APOEL
Vermeyen 10', 21', 43', 49'; De Nul 20', 22', 75', 87'; Put 55'; Janssens 80'		Agathokleous 65'

Herman Vanderpoortenstadion, Lier
Attendance: 7,004
Referee: Marian Środecki (Poland)

17 September 1969

Athletic Bilbao (Spain)	3–3	(England) Manchester City
Argoitia 9'; Clemente 12'; Uriarte 57'		Young 42'; Booth 68'; Echeberría 86' (o.g.)

San Mamés Stadium, Bilbao
Referee: Ferdinand Marschall (Austria)

17 September 1969

Ards (Northern Ireland)	0–0	(Italy) Roma

The Oval, Belfast
Referee: Robert Schaut (Belgium)

17 September 1969

Rapid Wien (Austria)	1–2	(Netherlands) PSV Eindhoven
Flögel 20'		Veenstra 5'; Schmidt Hansen 15'

Praterstadion, Vienna
Referee: Eric Jennings (England)

17 September 1969

Göztepe (Turkey)	3–0	Union Luxembourg
Aksel 7'; Özduran 58'; Halil Kiraz 67'	Report

Alsancak Mustafa Denizli Stadium, İzmir
Attendance: 15,384
Referee: Pavel Špoták (Czech Republic)

17 September 1969

Mjøndalen (Norway)	1–7	(Switzerland) St. Gallen
Olsen 44'		Clark 4', 35'; Toshack 43', 87'; Lea 67'; Sutton 74'; King 77'

Nedre Eiker Stadion, Mjøndalen
Referee: Joseph Hannet (Belgium)

30 August 1969

ÍBV (Iceland)	0–4	(Bulgaria) Levski-Spartak
		Veselinov 8'; Kirilov 14'; Kotkov 39'; Mitkov 43'

Hásteinsvöllur, Vestmannaeyjar
Referee: Henry Øberg (Norway)

17 September 1969

Frem (Denmark)	2–1	(Switzerland) St. Gallen
Hansen 21', 54'		Nafziger 15'

Valby Idrætspark, Copenhagen
Referee: Curt Liedberg (Sweden)

17 September 1969

Olympiacos (Greece)	2–2	(Poland) Górnik Zabrze
Gioutsos 55'; Sideris 84'		Wilczek 8', 36'

Leoforos Alexandras Stadium, Athens
Referee: Milivoje Gugulović (Yugoslavia)

17 September 1969

Rangers (Scotland)	2–0	(Romania) Steaua București
Johnston 40', 43'

Ibrox Stadium, Glasgow
Attendance: 60,000
Referee: José María Ortiz de Mendíbil (Spain)

=== Second leg ===
1 October 1969

Marseille (France)	2–0 (a.e.t.)	(Czechoslovakia) Dukla Prague
Loubet 15', 91'

Stade Vélodrome, Marseille
Referee: Gaspar Pintado Viu (Spain)

Marseille won 2–1 on aggregate.

1 October 1969

Slovan Bratislava (Czechoslovakia)	0–0	(Socialist Federal Republic of Yugoslavia) Dinamo Zagreb

Tehelné pole, Bratislava
Referee: Francesco Francescon (Italy)

Dinamo Zagreb won 3–0 on aggregate.

30 September 1969

Sliema Wanderers (Malta)	1–0	(Sweden) Norrköping
Griffiths 87'	Report

Empire Stadium, Gżira
Attendance: 5,037
Referee: Kevin Howley (England)

Norrköping won 6–2 on aggregate.

1 October 1969

Schalke 04 (West Germany)	3–0	(Republic of Ireland) Shamrock Rovers
Libuda 7'; Pirkner 57'; Wittkamp 80'

Glückauf-Kampfbahn, Gelsenkirchen
Referee: Pavel Kazakov (Soviet Union)

Schalke 04 won 4–2 on aggregate.

1 October 1969

MTK Hungária (Hungary)	1–1 (a.e.t.)	(East Germany) 1. FC Magdeburg
Takács 7'		Sparwasser 112'

Hidegkuti Nándor Stadion, Budapest
Referee: Michel Kitabdjian (France)

1. FC Magdeburg won 2–1 on aggregate.

1 October 1969

KuPS (Finland)	0–1	(Portugal) Académica
		Nene 65'

Väinölänniemen Stadion, Kuopio
Attendance: 2,693
Referee: Joseph Dorpmans (Netherlands)

Académica won 1–0 on aggregate.

24 September 1969

APOEL (Cyprus)	0–1	(Belgium) Lierse
		De Nul 15'

Herman Vanderpoortenstadion, Lier
Attendance: 3,271
Referee: Anton Bucheli (Switzerland)

Lierse won 11-1 on aggregate.

1 October 1969

Manchester City (England)	3–0	(Spain) Athletic Bilbao
Oakes 58'; Bell 66'; Bowyer 85'

Maine Road, Manchester
Referee: István Zsolt (Hungary)

Manchester City won 6–3 on aggregate.

1 October 1969

Roma (Italy)	3–1	(Northern Ireland) Ards
Salvori 20', 55'; Peiró 53'		Crothers 79'

Stadio Olimpico, Rome
Referee: Erich Linemayr (Austria)

Roma won 3–1 on aggregate.

1 October 1969

PSV Eindhoven (Netherlands)	4–2	(Austria) Rapid Wien
Van der Kuijlen 17'; Veenstra 38'; Schmidt Hansen 68', 71'		Flögel 25'; Bjerregaard 76'

Philips Stadion, Eindhoven
Referee: Joaquim Fernandes dos Campos (Portugal)

PSV Eindhoven won 6–3 on aggregate.

1 October 1969

Union Luxembourg	2–3	(Turkey) Göztepe
Bernadin 75'; Weis 88'	Report	Zemzem 15'; Nielsen 33', 67'

Stade Municipale, Luxembourg City
Attendance: 1,060
Referee: Gilbert Droz (Switzerland)

Göztepe won 6–2 on aggregate.

1 October 1969

Cardiff City (Wales)	5–1	(Norway) Mjøndalen
King 16', 68'; Allan 36', 38', 43'		Solberg 37'

Ninian Park, Cardiff
Referee: Günter Männig (East Germany)

Cardiff City won 12–2 on aggregate.

1 October 1969

Levski-Spartak (Bulgaria)	4–0	(Iceland) ÍBV
Kotkov 17', 18', 50'; Gaydarski 67'

Vasil Levski National Stadium, Sofia
Referee: Jacques Colling (Luxembourg)

Levski-Spartak won 8–0 on aggregate.

1 October 1969

St. Gallen (Switzerland)	1–0	(Denmark) Frem
Cornioley 53'

Espenmoos, St. Gallen
Referee: János Bíróczky (Hungary)

2–2 on aggregate, St. Gallen won on away goals.

1 October 1969

Górnik Zabrze (Poland)	5–0	(Greece) Olympiacos
Wilczek 1'; Skowronek 62'; Szołtysik 70'; Banaś 82' (pen.), 84'

Silesian Stadium, Chorzów
Referee: John Wright Paterson (Scotland)

Górnik Zabrze won 7–2 on aggregate.

1 October 1969

Steaua București (Romania)	0–0	(Scotland) Rangers

Stadionul 23 August, Bucharest
Attendance: 70,000
Referee: Leonidas Vamvakopoulos (Greece)

Rangers won 2–0 on aggregate.

== Second round ==
Team 1	Agg.	Team 2	1st leg	2nd leg
Marseille (France)	1–3	(Socialist Federal Republic of Yugoslavia) Dinamo Zagreb	1–1	0–2
Norrköping (Sweden)	0–1	(West Germany) Schalke 04	0–0	0–1
1. FC Magdeburg (East Germany)	1–2	(Portugal) Académica	1–0	0–2
Lierse (Belgium)	0–8	(England) Manchester City	0–3	0–5
Roma (Italy)	(c) 1–1	(Netherlands) PSV Eindhoven	1–0	0–1
Göztepe (Turkey)	3–1	(Wales) Cardiff City	3–0	0–1
Levski-Spartak (Bulgaria)	4–0	(Switzerland) St. Gallen	4–0	0–0
Górnik Zabrze (Poland)	6–2	(Scotland) Rangers	3–1	3–1

=== First leg ===
12 November 1969

Marseille (France)	1–1	(Socialist Federal Republic of Yugoslavia) Dinamo Zagreb
Loubet 28'		Čerček 80'

Stade Vélodrome, Marseille
Referee: Kevin Howley (England)

12 November 1969

Norrköping (Sweden)	0–0	(West Germany) Schalke 04

Idrottsparken, Norrköping
Referee: William Gow (Wales)

12 November 1969

1. FC Magdeburg (East Germany)	1–0	(Portugal) Académica
Sparwasser 41'

Ernst Grube Stadium, Magdeburg
Attendance: 14,038
Referee: Frede Hansen (Denmark)

12 November 1969

Lierse (Belgium)	0–3	(England) Manchester City
		Lee 5', 35'; Bell 45'

Herman Vanderpoortenstadion, Lier
Referee: Gerhard Schulenburg (West Germany)

12 November 1969

Roma (Italy)	1–0	(Netherlands) PSV Eindhoven
Capello 87' (pen.)

Stadio Olimpico, Rome
Referee: Robert Héliès (France)

12 November 1969

Göztepe (Turkey)	3–0	(Wales) Cardiff City
Zemzem 14'; Öznur 30'; Nielsen 33'

Alsancak Stadium, İzmir
Referee: Lado Jakše (Yugoslavia)

12 November 1969

Levski-Spartak (Bulgaria)	4–0	(Switzerland) St. Gallen
Kostov 11'; Panov 34'; Mitkov 62'; Kirilov 73'

Vasil Levski National Stadium, Sofia
Referee: Erich Linemayr (Austria)

12 November 1969

Górnik Zabrze (Poland)	3–1	(Scotland) Rangers
Lubański 5', 87'; Szaryński 11'		Persson 55'

Silesian Stadium, Chorzów
Referee: Joseph Hannet (Belgium)

=== Second leg ===
26 November 1969

Dinamo Zagreb (Socialist Federal Republic of Yugoslavia)	2–0	(France) Marseille
Novak 52', 90'

Stadion Maksimir, Zagreb
Referee: Gocho Rusev (Bulgaria)

Dinamo Zagreb won 3–1 on aggregate.

26 November 1969

Schalke 04 (West Germany)	1–0	(Sweden) Norrköping
Scheer 25'

Glückauf-Kampfbahn, Gelsenkirchen
Referee: Stanisław Eksztajn (Poland)

Schalke 04 won 1–0 on aggregate.

26 November 1969

Académica (Portugal)	2–0	(East Germany) 1. FC Magdeburg
Carlos Alhinho 57'; Mário Campos 85'

Estádio Municipal de Coimbra, Coimbra
Attendance: 9,335
Referee: Francesco Francescon (Italy)

Académica won 2–1 on aggregate.

26 November 1969

Manchester City (England)	5–0	(Belgium) Lierse
Summerbee 22'; Lee 48', 55'; Bell 60', 71'

Maine Road, Manchester
Referee: Rudi Glöckner (East Germany)

Manchester City won 8–0 on aggregate.

26 November 1969

PSV Eindhoven (Netherlands)	1–0 (a.e.t.)	(Italy) Roma
Van der Kuijlen 64' (pen.)

Philips Stadion, Eindhoven
Referee: Gyula Emsberger (Hungary)

1-1 on aggregate; Roma qualified on a coin toss.

26 November 1969

Cardiff City (Wales)	1–0	(Turkey) Göztepe
Bird 78'

Ninian Park, Cardiff
Referee: Gilbert Droz (Switzerland)

Göztepe won 3–1 on aggregate.

26 November 1969

St. Gallen (Switzerland)	0–0	(Bulgaria) Levski-Spartak

Espenmoos, St. Gallen
Referee: Pavel Špoták (Czech Republic)

Levski-Spartak won 4–0 on aggregate.

26 November 1969

Rangers (Scotland)	1–3	(Poland) Górnik Zabrze
Baxter 17'		Olek 63'; Lubański 77'; Skowronek 81'

Ibrox Stadium, Glasgow
Referee: Bertil Lööw (Sweden)

Górnik Zabrze won 6–2 on aggregate.

== Quarter-finals ==
Team 1	Agg.	Team 2	1st leg	2nd leg
Dinamo Zagreb (Socialist Federal Republic of Yugoslavia)	1–4	(West Germany) Schalke 04	1–3	0–1
Académica (Portugal)	0–1	(England) Manchester City	0–0	0–1 (aet)
Roma (Italy)	2–0	(Turkey) Göztepe	2–0	0–0
Levski-Spartak (Bulgaria)	4–4 (a)	(Poland) Górnik Zabrze	3–2	1–2

=== First leg ===
4 March 1970

Dinamo Zagreb (Socialist Federal Republic of Yugoslavia)	1–3	(West Germany) Schalke 04
Čerček 65'		Pirkner 45'; Fichtel 69'; Becher 86'

Stadion Maksimir, Zagreb
Referee: Erich Linemayr (Austria)

4 March 1970

Académica (Portugal)	0–0	(England) Manchester City

Estádio Municipal de Coimbra, Coimbra
Attendance: 8,206
Referee: Robert Schaut (Belgium)

4 March 1970

Roma (Italy)	2–0	(Turkey) Göztepe
Landini 32'; Cappelli 76'

Stadio Olimpico, Rome
Referee: Stanisław Eksztajn (Poland)

4 March 1970

Levski-Spartak (Bulgaria)	3–2	(Poland) Górnik Zabrze
Asparuhov 30', 89'; Panov 36'		Szołtysik 5'; Banaś 52'

Vasil Levski National Stadium, Sofia
Referee: István Zsolt (Hungary)

=== Second leg ===
18 March 1970

Schalke 04 (West Germany)	1–0	(Socialist Federal Republic of Yugoslavia) Dinamo Zagreb
Scheer 90'

Glückauf-Kampfbahn, Gelsenkirchen
Referee: Cornel Niţescu (Romania)

Schalke 04 won 4–1 on aggregate.

18 March 1970

Manchester City (England)	1–0 (a.e.t.)	(Portugal) Académica
Towers 120'

Maine Road, Manchester
Attendance: 36,111
Referee: Gocho Rusev (Bulgaria)

Manchester City won 1–0 on aggregate.

18 March 1970

Göztepe (Turkey)	0–0	(Italy) Roma

Alsancak Stadium, İzmir
Referee: Laurens van Ravens (Netherlands)

Roma won 2–0 on aggregate.

18 March 1970

Górnik Zabrze (Poland)	2–1	(Bulgaria) Levski-Spartak
Lubański 44'; Banaś 56'		Kirilov 59'

Silesian Stadium, Chorzów
Referee: Hans-Joachim Weyland (West Germany)

4–4 on aggregate, Górnik Zabrze won on away goals.

== Semi-finals ==
Team 1	Agg.	Team 2	1st leg	2nd leg	Play-off
Schalke 04 (West Germany)	2–5	(England) Manchester City	1–0	1–5	
Roma (Italy)	3–3	(Poland) Górnik Zabrze	1–1	2–2	1–1 (c)

=== First leg ===
1 April 1970

Schalke 04 (West Germany)	1–0	(England) Manchester City
Libuda 76'

Glückauf-Kampfbahn, Gelsenkirchen
Referee: Milivoje Gugulović (Yugoslavia)

1 April 1970

Roma (Italy)	1–1	(Poland) Górnik Zabrze
Salvori 53'		Banaś 28'

Stadio Olimpico, Rome
Referee: Todor Betchirov (Bulgaria)

=== Second leg ===
15 April 1970

Manchester City (England)	5–1	(West Germany) Schalke 04
Doyle 8'; Young 22', 28'; Lee 50'; Bell 81'		Libuda 89'

Maine Road, Manchester
Referee: Laurens van Ravens (Netherlands)

Manchester City won 5–2 on aggregate.

15 April 1970

Górnik Zabrze (Poland)	2–2 (a.e.t.)	(Italy) Roma
Lubański 90' (pen.), 93'		Capello 9' (pen.); Scaratti 120'

Silesian Stadium, Chorzów
Referee: José María Ortiz de Mendíbil (Spain)

3–3 on aggregate.

=== Play-off ===
22 April 1970

Górnik Zabrze (Poland)	1–1 (a.e.t.)	(Italy) Roma
Lubański 42'		Capello 57' (pen.)

Stade de la Meinau, Strasbourg
Referee: Roger Machin (France)

Górnik Zabrze won on a coin toss.

== Final ==
29 April 1970
19:30

Manchester City (England)	2–1	(Poland) Górnik Zabrze
Young 12'; Lee 43' (pen.)	Report	Oślizło 68'

Praterstadion, Vienna
Attendance: 7,968
Referee: Paul Schiller (Austria)

== Top scorers ==
The top scorers from the 1969–70 European Cup Winners' Cup are as follows:

Rank	Name	Team	Goals
1	(Poland) Włodzimierz Lubański	(Poland) Górnik Zabrze	7
2	(England) Francis Lee	(England) Manchester City	6
3	(Poland) Jan Banaś	(Poland) Górnik Zabrze	5
3	(England) Colin Bell	(England) Manchester City	5
3	(Belgium) André De Nul	(Belgium) Lierse	5
6	(Bulgaria) Nikola Kotkov	(Bulgaria) Levski-Spartak	4
6	(Belgium) Frans Vermeyen	(Belgium) Lierse	4
6	(England) Neil Young	(England) Manchester City	4

== See also ==
- 1969–70 European Cup
- 1969–70 Inter-Cities Fairs Cup
