= 1970 European Cup Winners' Cup final =

- Match programme cover
- Event: 1969–70 European Cup Winners' Cup
Manchester City	Górnik Zabrze
(England)	(Poland)
2	1
- Date: 29 April 1970
- Venue: Praterstadion, Vienna
- Referee: Paul Schiller (Austria)
- Attendance: 7,968

The 1970 European Cup Winners' Cup Final was a football match between 1968-69 FA Cup winners, Manchester City of England and 1968-69 Polish Cup winners, Górnik Zabrze of Poland on 29 April 1970 at Praterstadion in Vienna, Austria. It was the final match of the 1969–70 European Cup Winners' Cup and the tenth European Cup Winners' Cup final. Both sides made their first appearance in a European final. Manchester City won the match 2–1 thanks to goals by Neil Young and Francis Lee. The result was City's lone European triumph for more than 50 years, until their victory in the 2022–23 UEFA Champions League. It was also the last European final to be played and won in the month of April.

The game was not televised live in the United Kingdom due to a clash with the 1970 FA Cup final replay.

== Route to the final ==
(England) Manchester City					(Poland) Górnik Zabrze				
Opponent	Agg.	1st leg	2nd leg		Opponent	Agg.	1st leg	2nd leg	Replay
(Spain) Athletic Bilbao	6–3	3–3 (A)	3–0 (H)	First round	(Greece) Olympiacos	7–2	2–2 (A)	5–0 (H)	
(Belgium) Lierse	8–0	3–0 (A)	5–0 (H)	Second round	(Scotland) Rangers	6–2	3–1 (H)	3–1 (A)	
(Portugal) Académica	1–0	0–0 (A)	1–0 (aet) (H)	Quarter-finals	(Bulgaria) Levski-Spartak	4–4 (a)	2–3 (A)	2–1 (H)	
(Germany) Schalke 04	5–2	0–1 (A)	5–1 (H)	Semi-finals	(Italy) Roma	3–3 (c)	1–1 (A)	2–2 (aet) (H)	1–1 (aet)

Manchester City and Górnik Zabrze qualified for the Cup Winners' Cup by winning their respective national cups in the 1968–69 season. Manchester City defeated Leicester City in the 1969 FA Cup final, while Górnik Zabrze defeated Legia Warsaw 2–0 in the 1969 Polish Cup final. It was Manchester City's second European campaign; their maiden entry into European competition, an appearance in the 1968–69 European Cup, saw the club exit in the opening round.

Manchester City played the away leg first in every round. Their first tie was against Spanish club Athletic Bilbao, who were themselves managed by an Englishman, Ronnie Allen. In the first leg, City recovered from a two-goal deficit to secure a 3–3 draw. The home leg was a routine 3–0 win. Post-match reports alleged that a scuffle had taken place at half-time between Mike Doyle and José Ramón Betzuen. The referee spoke to both managers, but did not take any further action.

The 1969–70 cup run was Górnik's seventh European campaign. The club had participated in the European Cup six times in the previous decade. It was their first appearance in the Cup Winners' Cup. The club had qualified for the competition on one previous occasion, but withdrew without playing a match.

In the semi-final, Górnik faced Roma. After the second leg, the aggregate score was level at 3–3, so a playoff match was held on neutral ground in Strasbourg. When this also finished level, a coin toss determined the winner. A disc with red and green sides was used. Górnik's captain Stanisław Oślizło's selection of green won.

== Match ==
=== Summary ===
Manchester City were without winger Mike Summerbee with a leg injury that had troubled him since the League Cup final the previous month. George Heslop came into the team as a result, though Summerbee was fit enough to be named as a substitute. Heslop was given the task of man-marking Włodzimierz Lubański, who The Guardian identified as "an outstanding individual... ...whom Malcolm Allison considers to be in the same class as Eusébio."

Manchester City started strongly, particularly Francis Lee; The Guardian correspondent wrote "Lee, indefatigable and nigh irresistible continually embarrassed the Górnik defence in the early stages". Lee had the first chance of the match, a close range shot which was saved by Kostka. Manchester City took the lead in the 12th minute. Lee cut in from the left wing, escaping a tackle from Alfred Olek, and struck a fierce shot. Goalkeeper Hubert Kostka parried the ball, only for it to land at the feet of Neil Young for a simple finish. Shortly after City defender Mike Doyle sustained an ankle injury after colliding with Stefan Florenski. Manchester City played on with ten men for a period as Doyle received treatment from trainer Dave Ewing, but the defender was unable to continue. Substitute Ian Bowyer replaced him. The change prompted an alteration in formation, in which Colin Bell switched to a deeper position. Shortly before half-time, Young won the ball after loose play from Florenski, which put him clear on goal. As Young moved into the penalty area Kostka rushed out of his goal and upended him, leaving the referee no option but to give a penalty. Lee struck the spot-kick with power into the centre of the goal. Kostka's legs made contact with the ball, but the force of the shot carried it into the net to make it 2–0. Górnik got a goal back midway through the second half, but there were no more goals and the match finished 2–1.

=== Details ===
29 April 1970
19:30 CEST

Manchester City (England)	2–1	(Poland) Górnik Zabrze
Young 12'; Lee 43' (pen.)	Report	Oślizło 68'

Praterstadion, Vienna
Attendance: 7,968
Referee: Paul Schiller (Austria)

Manchester City	Górnik Zabrze

GK	1	(England) Joe Corrigan
RB	2	(England) Tony Book (c)
CB	5	(England) Tommy Booth
CB	7	(England) George Heslop
LB	3	(England) Glyn Pardoe
CM	4	(England) Mike Doyle	(substituted off) 23'
CM	6	(England) Alan Oakes
CM	11	(England) Tony Towers
RW	8	(England) Colin Bell
CF	9	(England) Francis Lee
LW	10	(England) Neil Young
Substitutes:
MF	12	(England) Ian Bowyer	(substituted on) 23'
Manager:
(England) Joe Mercer

GK	1	(Poland) Hubert Kostka
SW	3	(Poland) Stanisław Oślizło (c)
RB	4	(Poland) Jerzy Gorgoń
CB	5	(Poland) Stefan Florenski	(substituted off) 85'
CB	8	(Poland) Alfred Olek
LB	2	(Poland) Henryk Latocha
CM	7	(Poland) Erwin Wilczek	(substituted off) 75'
CM	6	(Poland) Zygfryd Szołtysik
RW	9	(Poland) Jan Banaś
LW	11	(Poland) Władysław Szaryński
CF	10	(Poland) Włodzimierz Lubański
Substitutes:
MF	13	(Poland) Alojzy Deja	(substituted on) 85'
CM	16	(Poland) Hubert Skowronek	(substituted on) 75'
Manager:
(Poland) Michał Matyas

Assistant referees:
Franz Wöhrer (Austria)
Erich Linemayr (Austria)

== Post-match ==
Winning manager Joe Mercer said "the heavy rain in the second half ruined the game" and that he was "quite happy with the performance of our team, although the technical level was rather low in the second half". Górnik manager Michał Matyas blamed his side's poor start, saying the "first goal came too early for us and we never recovered from this shock."

== See also ==
- 1970 European Cup Final
- 1970 Inter-Cities Fairs Cup Final
- Manchester City F.C. in European football

== Bibliography ==
- Gardner, Peter (1970). The Manchester City Football Book No. 2. London: Stanley Paul. ISBN 0-09-103280-6.
- James, Gary (2006). Manchester City - The Complete Record. Derby: Breedon. ISBN 1-85983-512-0.
- James, Gary (2009). The Big Book of City. Halifax: James Ward. ISBN 978-0-9558127-2-9.
- Penney, Ian (2008). Manchester City: The Mercer-Allison Years. Derby: Breedon. ISBN 978-1-85983-608-8.
- Ward, Andrew (1984). The Manchester City Story. Derby: Breedon. ISBN 0-907969-05-4.
