= 1972–73 European Cup =

European football tournament

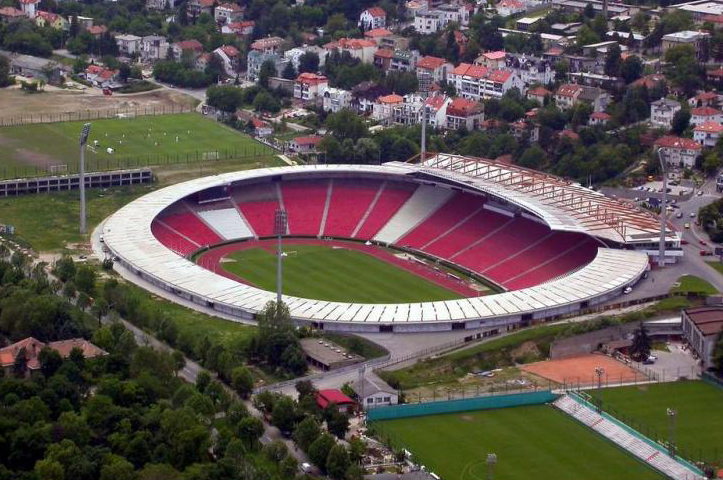
- The Stadion FK Crvena Zvezda in Belgrade hosted the final.

Tournament details
- Dates: 13 September 1972 – 30 May 1973
- Teams: 30

Final positions
- Champions: (Netherlands) Ajax (3rd title)
- Runners-up: (Italy) Juventus

Tournament statistics
- Matches played: 57
- Goals scored: 160 (2.81 per match)
- Attendance: 1,752,786 (30,751 per match)
- Top scorer(s): Gerd Müller (Bayern Munich); 11 goals

The 1972–73 season of the European Cup football club tournament was won for the third consecutive time by Ajax in the final against Juventus at Red Star Stadium in Belgrade. The win by Ajax resulted in the fourth consecutive championship by a Dutch team. Since Ajax had won the cup for a third time, they got to keep the full size copy of the cup. Because the reigning European champions were also champions of their own league, and neither Albania nor Northern Ireland sent their champions, the number of participating clubs dropped from 33 to 30.

== Teams ==
(Austria) Wacker Innsbruck (1st)	(Belgium) Anderlecht (1st)	(Bulgaria) CSKA Sofia (1st)
(Cyprus) Omonia (1st)	(Czechoslovakia) Spartak Trnava (1st)	(Denmark) Vejle (1st)
(England) Derby County (1st)	(Finland) TPS (1st)	(France) Marseille (1st)
(East Germany) Magdeburg (1st)	(West Germany) Bayern Munich (1st)	(Greece) Panathinaikos (1st)
(Hungary) Újpesti Dózsa (1st)	(Iceland) Keflavík (1st)	(Republic of Ireland) Waterford (1st)
(Italy) Juventus (1st)	(Luxembourg) Aris (1st)	(Malta) Sliema Wanderers (1st)
(Netherlands) Ajax (1st)^{TH}	(Norway) Rosenborg (1st)	(Poland) Górnik Zabrze (1st)
(Portugal) Benfica (1st)	(Romania) Argeș Pitești (1st)	(Scotland) Celtic (1st)
(Spain) Real Madrid (1st)	(Sweden) Malmö FF (1st)	(Switzerland) Basel (1st)
(Turkey) Galatasaray (1st)	(Soviet Union) Dynamo Kyiv (1st)	(Socialist Federal Republic of Yugoslavia) Željezničar (1st)

== Bracket ==
First round
(Bulgaria) CSKA	2	2	4
(Greece) Panathinaikos	1	0	1
(Turkey) Galatasaray	1	0	1
(West Germany) Bayern Munich	1	6	7
(Republic of Ireland) Waterford United	2	0	2
(Cyprus) Omonia	1	2	3
(Austria) Wacker	0	0	0
(Soviet Union) Dynamo Kyïv	1	2	3
(Malta) Sliema Wanderers	0	0	0
(Poland) Górnik Zabrze	5	5	10
(Luxembourg) Aris	0	0	0
(Romania) Argeș Pitești	2	4	6
(Spain) Real Madrid	3	1	4
(Iceland) Keflavík	0	0	0
(France) Marseille	1	0	1
(Italy) Juventus	0	3	3
(East Germany) Magdeburg	6	3	9
(Finland) TPS	0	1	1
(Scotland) Celtic	2	3	5
(Norway) Rosenborg	1	1	2
(Hungary) Újpesti	2	2	4
(Switzerland) Basel	0	3	3
(Belgium) Anderlecht	4	3	7
(Denmark) Vejle	2	0	2
(England) Derby County	2	2	4
(Socialist Federal Republic of Yugoslavia) Željezničar	1	0	1
(Sweden) Malmö FF	1	1	2
(Portugal) Benfica	0	4	4

Second round
(Bulgaria) CSKA	1	0	1
(Netherlands) Ajax	3	3	6
(West Germany) Bayern Munich	9	4	13
(Cyprus) Omonia	0	0	0
(Soviet Union) Dynamo Kyïv	2	1	3
(Poland) Górnik Zabrze	0	2	2
(Romania) Argeș Pitești	2	1	3
(Spain) Real Madrid	1	3	4
(Italy) Juventus	1	1	2
(East Germany) Magdeburg	0	0	0
(Scotland) Celtic	2	0	2
(Hungary) Újpesti	1	3	4
(Czechoslovakia) Spartak Trnava	1	1	2
(Belgium) Anderlecht	0	0	0
(England) Derby County	3	0	3
(Portugal) Benfica	0	0	0

Quarter-finals
(Netherlands) Ajax	4	1	5
(West Germany) Bayern Munich	0	2	2
(Soviet Union) Dynamo Kyïv	0	0	0
(Spain) Real Madrid	0	3	3
(Italy) Juventus	0	2	2
(Hungary) Újpesti	0	2	2
(Czechoslovakia) Spartak Trnava	1	0	1
(England) Derby County	0	2	2

Semi-finals
(Netherlands) Ajax	2	1	3
(Spain) Real Madrid	1	0	1
(Italy) Juventus	3	0	3
(England) Derby County	1	0	1

Final
(Netherlands) Ajax	1
(Italy) Juventus	0

== First round ==
Team 1	Agg.	Team 2	1st leg	2nd leg
CSKA Sofia (Bulgaria)	4–1	(Greece) Panathinaikos	2–1	2–0 (Note: Originally 1–2 to Panathinaikos, with CSKA winning the subsequent penalty shoot-out 3–2. Panathinaikos complained to UEFA, and the match was annulled and replayed the following month.)
Ajax (Netherlands)	Bye	–	–	–
Galatasaray (Turkey)	1–7	(West Germany) Bayern Munich	1–1	0–6
Waterford (Republic of Ireland)	2–3	(Cyprus) Omonia	2–1	0–2
Wacker (Austria)	0–3	(Soviet Union) Dynamo Kyiv	0–1	0–2
Sliema Wanderers (Malta)	0–10	(Poland) Górnik Zabrze	0–5	0–5
Aris (Luxembourg)	0–6	(Romania) Argeș Pitești	0–2	0–4
Real Madrid (Spain)	4–0	(Iceland) Keflavík	3–0	1–0
Marseille (France)	1–3	(Italy) Juventus	1–0	0–3
Magdeburg (East Germany)	9–1	(Finland) TPS	6–0	3–1
Celtic (Scotland)	5–2	(Norway) Rosenborg	2–1	3–1
Újpesti Dózsa (Hungary)	4–3	(Switzerland) Basel	2–0	2–3
Spartak Trnava (Czechoslovakia)	Bye	–	–	–
Anderlecht (Belgium)	7–2	(Denmark) Vejle	4–2	3–0
Derby County (England)	4–1	(Socialist Federal Republic of Yugoslavia) Željezničar	2–0	2–1 (Note: The match was played at FK Sarajevo's Stadion Koševo due to Željezničar's Grbavica ground undergoing renovations.)
Malmö FF (Sweden)	2–4	(Portugal) Benfica	1–0	1–4

=== First leg ===
13 September 1972

CSKA Sofia (Bulgaria)	2–1	(Greece) Panathinaikos
Kolev 24' (pen.); Yankov 71'	Report	Verón 59'

Vasil Levski National Stadium, Sofia
Attendance: 21,901

13 September 1972

Galatasaray (Turkey)	1–1	(West Germany) Bayern Munich
Ünder 55'	Report	Müller 66'

Mithat Paşa Stadyumu
Attendance: 42,850

13 September 1972

Waterford (Republic of Ireland)	2–1	(Cyprus) Omonia
Hale 5', 10'	Report	Rotsidis 79'

Kilcohan Park, Waterford
Attendance: 2,544
Referee: René Vigliani (France)

13 September 1972
19:30

Wacker (Austria)	0–1	(Soviet Union) Dynamo Kyiv
	Report	Puzach 88'

Tivoli, Innsbruck
Attendance: 8,655
Referee: Theo Boosten (Netherlands)

13 September 1972

Sliema Wanderers (Malta)	0–5	(Poland) Górnik Zabrze
	Report	Lubański 25', 27', 39'; Banaś 82'; Wilczek 87'

Empire Stadium, Gżira
Attendance: 3,898

13 September 1972

Aris Bonnevoie (Luxembourg)	0–2	(Romania) Argeș Pitești
	Report	Troi 58'; Dobrin 89' (pen.)

Stade Josy Barthel, Bonnevoie
Attendance: 350
Referee: Joseph Minnoy (Belgium)

13 September 1972

Real Madrid (Spain)	3–0	(Iceland) Keflavík
Santillana 15', 30'; Grande 90'	Report

Santiago Bernabéu Stadium, Madrid
Attendance: 30,000

13 September 1972

Marseille (France)	1–0	(Italy) Juventus
Bonnel 52'	Report

Stade de Gerland, Lyon
Attendance: 21,403

13 September 1972

Magdeburg (East Germany)	6–0	(Finland) TPS
Mewes 5'; Pommerenke 24', 79'; Seguin 30'; Sparwasser 38', 45'	Report

Ernst-Grube-Stadion, Magdeburg
Attendance: 16,119

13 September 1972

Celtic (Scotland)	2–1	(Norway) Rosenborg
Macari 15'; Deans 45'	Report	Wirkola 55'

Hampden Park, Glasgow
Attendance: 18,489

13 September 1972

Újpesti Dózsa (Hungary)	2–0	(Switzerland) Basel
Horváth 57'; Zámbó 60'	Report

Megyeri úti Stadion, Budapest
Attendance: 4,282

13 September 1972

Anderlecht (Belgium)	4–2	(Denmark) Vejle
Ejderstedt 49'; Rensenbrink 59', 62'; Van Himst 85'	Report	Johansen 64' (pen.), 67'

Stade Emile Versé, Anderlecht
Attendance: 7,837

13 September 1972

Derby County (England)	2–0	(Socialist Federal Republic of Yugoslavia) Željezničar
McFarland 38'; Gemmill 53'	Report

Baseball Ground, Derby
Attendance: 27,350

13 September 1972

Malmö FF (Sweden)	1–0	(Portugal) Benfica
Larsson 11'	Report

Malmö Stadion, Malmö
Attendance: 9,492
Referee: Wolfgang Riedel (East Germany)

=== Second leg ===
27 September 1972

Panathinaikos (Greece)	Annulled	(Bulgaria) CSKA Sofia
Verón 18'; Melo 20' (pen.)		Trankov 68'
Penalties
Gramajo (penalty scored); Verón (penalty scored); Domazos (penalty missed); Irala (penalty missed)	2–3	(penalty scored) Kolev; (penalty scored) Nikodimov; (penalty scored) Gaganelov

Leoforos Alexandras Stadium, Athens
Attendance: 24,927

The game was annulled because the referee ended the shoot-out prematurely after Panathinaikos fourth penalty was saved by Bulgarian goalkeeper. Panathinaikos complained to UEFA and the match was annulled and replayed the following month.

26 October 1972

Panathinaikos (Greece)	0–2	(Bulgaria) CSKA Sofia
	Report	Zhekov 4'; Kolev 46'

Leoforos Alexandras Stadium, Athens
Attendance: 22,546

CSKA Sofia won 4–1 on aggregate.

27 September 1972

Bayern Munich (West Germany)	6–0	(Turkey) Galatasaray
Müller 14', 78'; Hoeneß 29'; Schneider 35'; Beckenbauer 76' (pen.); Roth 88'	Report

Olympiastadion, Munich
Attendance: 60,000

Bayern Munich won 7–1 on aggregate.

27 September 1972

Omonia (Cyprus)	2–0	(Republic of Ireland) Waterford
Chelebis 18', 63'	Report

GSP Stadium, Nicosia
Attendance: 5,095
Referee: Milivoje Gugulović (Yugoslavia)

Omonia won 3–2 on aggregate.

27 September 1972
19:00

Dynamo Kyiv (Soviet Union)	2–0	(Austria) Wacker
Puzach 23'; Damin 51'	Report

Respublikanskiy Stadion, Kyiv
Attendance: 35,037
Referee: Doğan Babacan (Turkey)

Dynamo Kyiv won 3–0 on aggregate.

27 September 1972

Górnik Zabrze (Poland)	5–0	(Malta) Sliema Wanderers
Szołtysik 1'; Lubański 31'; Szarmach 62', 90'; Oślizło 67'	Report

Stadion Ernesta Pohla, Zabrze
Attendance: 5,020

Górnik Zabrze won 10–0 on aggregate.

27 September 1972

Argeș Pitești (Romania)	4–0	(Luxembourg) Aris Bonnevoie
Dobrin 4', 47' (pen.); Radu 14', 28'	Report

Stadionul 1 Mai, Pitești
Attendance: 4,500
Referee: Georgios Katsoras (Greece)

Argeș Pitești won 6–0 on aggregate.

27 September 1972

Keflavík (Iceland)	0–1	(Spain) Real Madrid
	Report	Verdugo 89'

Laugardalsvöllur, Reykjavík
Attendance: 4,219

Real Madrid won 4–0 on aggregate.

27 September 1972

Juventus (Italy)	3–0	(France) Marseille
Bettega 4', 37'; Haller 44'	Report

Stadio Comunale, Turin
Attendance: 56,389
Referee: Tsvetan Stanev (Bulgaria)

Juventus won 3–1 on aggregate.

27 September 1972

TPS (Finland)	1–3	(East Germany) Magdeburg
Toivola 73'	Report	Sparwasser 52', 87'; Jalonen 72' (o.g.)

Kupittaan jalkapallostadion, Turku
Attendance: 1,282

Magdeburg won 9–1 on aggregate.

27 September 1972

Rosenborg (Norway)	1–3	(Scotland) Celtic
Christiansen 38'	Report	Macari 55', 88'; Hood 83'

Lerkendal Stadion, Oslo
Attendance: 16,153

Celtic won 5–2 on aggregate.

27 September 1972

Basel (Switzerland)	3–2	(Hungary) Újpesti Dózsa
Hasler 65'; Balmer 75', 83'	Report	Bene 46', 89'

St. Jakob Stadion, Basel
Attendance: 15,962

Újpesti Dózsa won 4–3 on aggregate.

27 September 1972

Vejle (Denmark)	0–3	(Belgium) Anderlecht
	Report	Volders 61'; Rensenbrink 85', 87'

Vejle Stadion, Vejle
Attendance: 11,431

Anderlecht won 7–2 on aggregate.

27 September 1972

Željezničar (Socialist Federal Republic of Yugoslavia)	1–2	(England) Derby County
Sprečo 60'	Report	Hinton 9'; O'Hare 15'

Gradski stadion Koševo, Sarajevo
Attendance: 32,080

Derby County won 4–1 on aggregate.

27 September 1972

Benfica (Portugal)	4–1	(Sweden) Malmö FF
Jordão 24'; Simões 29'; Eusébio 43' (pen.), 60'	Report	Tapper 89' (pen.)

Estádio da Luz, Lisbon
Attendance: 34,628
Referee: Robert Héliès (France)

Benfica won 4–2 on aggregate.

== Second round ==
Team 1	Agg.	Team 2	1st leg	2nd leg
CSKA Sofia (Bulgaria)	1–6	(Netherlands) Ajax	1–3	0–3
Bayern Munich (West Germany)	13–0	(Cyprus) Omonia	9–0	4–0
Dynamo Kyiv (Soviet Union)	3–2	(Poland) Górnik Zabrze	2–0	1–2
Argeș Pitești (Romania)	3–4	(Spain) Real Madrid	2–1	1–3
Juventus (Italy)	2–0	(East Germany) Magdeburg	1–0	1–0
Celtic (Scotland)	2–4	(Hungary) Újpesti Dózsa	2–1	0–3
Spartak Trnava (Czechoslovakia)	2–0	(Belgium) Anderlecht	1–0	1–0
Derby County (England)	3–0	(Portugal) Benfica	3–0	0–0

=== First leg ===
8 November 1972

CSKA Sofia (Bulgaria)	1–3	(Netherlands) Ajax
Zhekov 27'	Report	Swart 13'; Keizer 32'; Haan 52'

Vasil Levski National Stadium, Sofia
Attendance: 70,000

24 October 1972

Bayern Munich (West Germany)	9–0	(Cyprus) Omonia
Müller 14', 37', 54', 73', 74'; Hoeneß 25'; Roth 42'; Schneider 69', 82'	Report

Olympiastadion, Munich
Attendance: 11,931
Referee: Michal Jursa (Czechoslovakia)

25 October 1972
19:00

Dynamo Kyiv (Soviet Union)	2–0	(Poland) Górnik Zabrze
Muntyan 60'; Puzach 75'	Report

Respublikanskiy Stadion, Kyiv
Attendance: 60,112
Referee: György Müncz (Hungary)

25 October 1972

Argeș Pitești (Romania)	2–1	(Spain) Real Madrid
Dobrin 22' (pen.); Prepurgel 62'	Report	Anzarda 41'

Stadionul 1 Mai, Pitești
Attendance: 15,000
Referee: David Smith (England)

25 October 1972
21:00

Juventus (Italy)	1–0	(East Germany) Magdeburg
Anastasi 66'	Report

Stadio Comunale, Turin
Attendance: 37,678
Referee: Rudolf Scheurer (Switzerland)

25 October 1972

Celtic (Scotland)	2–1	(Hungary) Újpesti Dózsa
Dalglish 60', 75'	Report	Bene 38'

Celtic Park, Glasgow
Attendance: 51,515
Referee: Ferdinand Biwersi (West Germany)

25 October 1972

Spartak Trnava (Czechoslovakia)	1–0	(Belgium) Anderlecht
Kabát 46'	Report

Stadion Trnava, Trnava
Attendance: 18,700
Referee: Arie van Gemert (Dutch)

25 October 1972

Derby County (England)	3–0	(Portugal) Benfica
McFarland 6'; Hector 8'; McGovern 40'	Report

Baseball Ground, Derby
Attendance: 36,282
Referee: Bertil Lööw (Sweden)

=== Second leg ===
29 November 1972

Ajax (Netherlands)	3–0	(Bulgaria) CSKA Sofia
Cruyff 13', 75'; Blankenburg 15'	Report

Olympisch Stadion, Amsterdam
Attendance: 35,027

Ajax won 6–1 on aggregate.

26 October 1972

Omonia (Cyprus)	0–4	(West Germany) Bayern Munich
	Report	Roth 29'; Müller 42', 66'; Hoffmann 50'

Rosenaustadion, Augsburg, West Germany
Attendance: 14,199
Referee: Josef Pláček (Czechoslovakia)

Bayern Munich won 13–0 on aggregate.

8 November 1972
13:30

Górnik Zabrze (Poland)	2–1	(Soviet Union) Dynamo Kyiv
Lubański 30'; Gorgoń 62'	Report	Blokhin 25'

Silesian Stadium, Chorzów
Attendance: 48,527
Referee: Liuben Radunchev (Bulgaria)

Dynamo Kyiv won 3–2 on aggregate.

9 November 1972

Real Madrid (Spain)	3–1	(Romania) Argeș Pitești
Santillana 18', 87'; Grande 47'	Report	Radu 43'

Santiago Bernabéu Stadium, Madrid
Attendance: 14,939
Referee: Milivoje Gugulovic (Yugoslavia)

Real Madrid won 4–3 on aggregate.

8 November 1972

Magdeburg (East Germany)	0–1	(Italy) Juventus
	Report	Cuccureddu 51'

Ernst-Grube-Stadion, Magdeburg
Attendance: 41,790

Juventus won 2–0 on aggregate.

8 November 1972

Újpesti Dózsa (Hungary)	3–0	(Scotland) Celtic
Bene 7', 24'; Fazekas 15' (pen.)	Report

Megyeri úti Stadion, Budapest
Attendance: 13,012

Újpesti Dózsa won 4–2 on aggregate.

8 November 1972

Anderlecht (Belgium)	0–1	(Czechoslovakia) Spartak Trnava
	Report	Masrna 88'

Stade Émile Versé, Anderlecht
Attendance: 23,548
Referee: Pablo Sánchez Ibáñez (Spain)

Spartak Trnava won 2–0 on aggregate.

8 November 1972

Benfica (Portugal)	0–0	(England) Derby County
	Report

Estádio da Luz, Lisbon
Attendance: 49,978
Referee: Robert Schaut (Belgium)

Derby County won 3–0 on aggregate.

== Quarter-finals ==
Team 1	Agg.	Team 2	1st leg	2nd leg
Ajax (Netherlands)	5–2	(West Germany) Bayern Munich	4–0	1–2
Dynamo Kyiv (Soviet Union)	0–3	(Spain) Real Madrid	0–0	0–3
Juventus (Italy)	2–2 (a)	(Hungary) Újpesti Dózsa	0–0	2–2
Spartak Trnava (Czechoslovakia)	1–2	(England) Derby County	1–0	0–2

=== First leg ===
7 March 1973

Ajax (Netherlands)	4–0	(West Germany) Bayern Munich
Haan 53', 70'; G. Mühren 68'; Cruyff 89'	Report

Olympisch Stadion, Amsterdam
Attendance: 53,230

7 March 1973
17:00

Dynamo Kyiv (Soviet Union)	0–0	(Spain) Real Madrid
	Report

ChMP Central Stadium, Odesa (Note: Dynamo Kyiv played their home match at ChMP Central Stadium, Odesa, instead of their regular stadium Central Stadium, Kyiv, due to frozen pitch.)
Attendance: 36,239
Referee: Sergio Gonella (Italy)

7 March 1973

Juventus (Italy)	0–0	(Hungary) Újpesti Dózsa
	Report

Stadio Comunale, Turin
Attendance: 64,844

7 March 1973

Spartak Trnava (Czechoslovakia)	1–0	(England) Derby County
Horváth 42'	Report

Stadion Trnava, Trnava
Attendance: 24,838
Referee: Károly Palotai (Hungary)

=== Second leg ===
21 March 1973

Bayern Munich (West Germany)	2–1	(Netherlands) Ajax
Krol 30' (o.g.); Müller 37'	Report	Keizer 7'

Olympiastadion, Munich
Attendance: 74,194

Ajax won 5–2 on aggregate.

21 March 1973
21:30

Real Madrid (Spain)	3–0	(Soviet Union) Dynamo Kyiv
Santillana 2'; Aguilar 36'; Amancio 81'	Report

Santiago Bernabéu Stadium, Madrid
Attendance: 27,949
Referee: Erich Linemayr (Austria)

Real Madrid won 3–0 on aggregate.

21 March 1973

Újpesti Dózsa (Hungary)	2–2	(Italy) Juventus
Bene 1'; A. Tóth 13'	Report	Altafini 30'; Anastasi 56'

Megyeri úti Stadion, Budapest
Attendance: 28,550

2–2 on aggregate; Juventus won on away goals.

21 March 1973

Derby County (England)	2–0	(Czechoslovakia) Spartak Trnava
Hector 40', 51'	Report

Baseball Ground, Derby
Attendance: 36,272
Referee: Aurelio Angonese (Italy)

Derby County won 2–1 on aggregate.

== Semi-finals ==
Team 1	Agg.	Team 2	1st leg	2nd leg
Ajax (Netherlands)	3–1	(Spain) Real Madrid	2–1	1–0
Juventus (Italy)	3–1	(England) Derby County	3–1	0–0

=== First leg ===
11 April 1973

Ajax (Netherlands)	2–1	(Spain) Real Madrid
Hulshoff 67'; Krol 77'	Report	Pirri 84'

Olympisch Stadion, Amsterdam
Attendance: 53,234

11 April 1973

Juventus (Italy)	3–1	(England) Derby County
Altafini 27', 84'; Causio 65'	Report	Hector 29'

Stadio Comunale, Turin
Attendance: 53,758

=== Second leg ===
25 April 1973

Real Madrid (Spain)	0–1	(Netherlands) Ajax
	Report	G. Mühren 50'

Santiago Bernabéu Stadium, Madrid
Attendance: 110,000

Ajax won 3–1 on aggregate.

25 April 1973

Derby County (England)	0–0	(Italy) Juventus
	Report

Baseball Ground, Derby
Attendance: 38,444

Juventus won 3–1 on aggregate.

== Final ==
30 May 1973
20:30

Ajax (Netherlands)	1–0	(Italy) Juventus
Rep 5'	Report

Stadion Crvena Zvezda, Belgrade
Attendance: 89,484
Referee: Milivoje Gugulović (Yugoslavia)

== Top scorers ==
Rank	Name	Team	Goals
1	(West Germany) Gerd Müller	(West Germany) Bayern Munich	11
2	(Hungary) Ferenc Bene	(Hungary) Újpesti Dózsa	6
3	(Poland) Włodzimierz Lubański	(Poland) Górnik Zabrze	5
3	(Spain) Santillana	(Spain) Real Madrid	5
5	(Romania) Nicolae Dobrin	(Romania) Argeș Pitești	4
5	(England) Kevin Hector	(England) Derby County	4
5	(Netherlands) Rob Rensenbrink	(Belgium) Anderlecht	4
5	(East Germany) Jürgen Sparwasser	(East Germany) Magdeburg	4
9	(Italy) José Altafini	(Italy) Juventus	3
9	(Netherlands) Arie Haan	(Netherlands) Ajax	3
9	(Netherlands) Johan Cruyff	(Netherlands) Ajax	3
9	(Scotland) Lou Macari	(Scotland) Celtic	3
9	(Soviet Union) Anatoliy Puzach	(Soviet Union) Dynamo Kyiv	3
9	(Romania) Constantin Radu	(Romania) Argeș Pitești	3
9	(West Germany) Franz Roth	(West Germany) Bayern Munich	3
9	(West Germany) Edgar Schneider	(West Germany) Bayern Munich	3
