= Jan Gomola =

Polish footballer (1941–2022)

Personal information
- Date of birth: 5 August 1941
- Place of birth: Ustroń, Poland
- Date of death: 24 February 2022 (aged 80)
- Place of death: Ustroń, Poland
- Height: 1.83 m (6 ft 0 in)
- Position: Goalkeeper

Youth career
- Kuźnia Ustroń

Senior career*
Years	Team	Apps	(Gls)
1963–1965	Kuźnia Ustroń		
1965–1974	Górnik Zabrze	118	(0)
1974–1975	Atlético Español	36	(0)
1975–1976	Atlético Zacatepec	7	(0)
1977	Atlético Español	7	(0)

International career
1966–1971	Poland	7	(0)
- * Club domestic league appearances and goals

Jan Gomola (5 August 1941 – 24 February 2022) was a Polish footballer who played as a goalkeeper. He made seven appearances for the Poland national team from 1966 to 1971. Gomola died on 24 February 2022, at the age of 80. Besides Poland, he played in Mexico.

== Career ==
Gomola started his career with Górnik Zabrze.

== Honours ==
Górnik Zabrze

- Ekstraklasa: 1964–65, 1965–66, 1966–67, 1970–71, 1971–72
- Polish Cup: 1967–68, 1968–69, 1969–70, 1970–71
