= Henryk Latocha =

Polish footballer

Personal information
- Date of birth: 8 June 1943 (age 83)
- Place of birth: Bieruń Stary, Poland
- Height: 1.76 m (5 ft 9 in)
- Position: Defender

Senior career*
Years	Team	Apps	(Gls)
1956–1961	Unia Bieruń Stary		
1962–1963	Piast Gliwice		
1963–1965	Górnik Lędziny		
1965–1973	Siarka Tarnobrzeg		
1973	Rapid Wien		
1974–1976	GKS Katowice		
1977–1979	Polyar Kittsee		
1979	FC Gols		

International career
1968–1970	Poland	8	(0)
- * Club domestic league appearances and goals

Henryk Latocha (born 8 June 1943) is a Polish former footballer who played as a defender. He played in eight matches for the Poland national football team from 1968 to 1970.

== Honours ==
Górnik Zabrze

- Ekstraklasa: 1965–66, 1966–67, 1970–71, 1971–72
- Polish Cup: 1967–68, 1968–69, 1969–70, 1970–71, 1971–72
