= Stanisław Oślizło =

Polish footballer

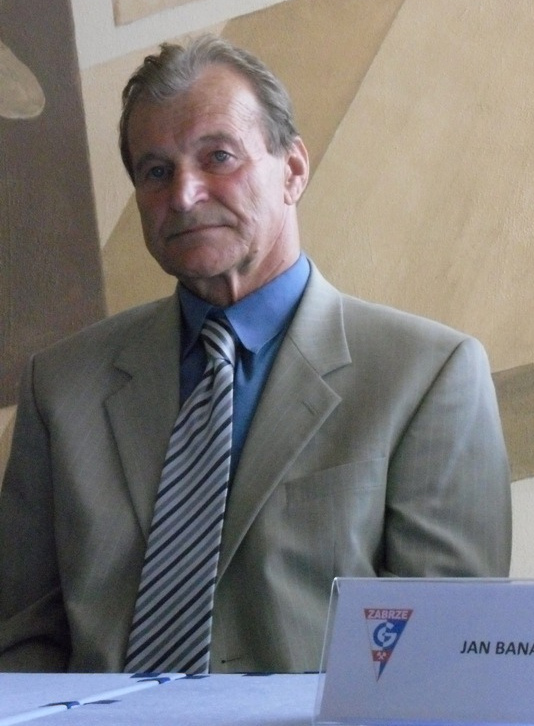
- Oślizło in 2011

Personal information
- Date of birth: 13 November 1937 (age 88)
- Place of birth: Jedłownik, Poland
- Height: 1.78 m (5 ft 10 in)
- Position: Defender

Senior career*
Years	Team	Apps	(Gls)
1953–1955	Odra Wodzisław		
1955–1956	Kolejarz 24 Katowice		
1956–1960	Górnik Radlin		
1960–1973	Górnik Zabrze	296	(3)

International career
1961–1971	Poland	57	(1)

Managerial career
- 1977: Górnik 09 Mysłowice
- 1977: Piast Gliwice
- 1979–1980: GKS Katowice
- 1983–1985: Carbo Gliwice
- 1985–1986: Odra Wodzisław Śląski
- 1986: Pogoń Zabrze
- 1987–1988: AKS Chorzów
- 1995: Górnik Zabrze
- * Club domestic league appearances and goals

Stanisław Oślizło (born 13 November 1937) is a Polish former professional football manager and player who played as a defender.

He began playing football in 1953 with the local clubs Odra Wodzisław and later Górnik Radlin. Playing for Górnik Zabrze during the club's golden era, Oślizło also represented Poland 57 times, scoring one goal (1961–1971). He was Górnik's captain in the 1969–70 European Cup Winners' Cup final against Manchester City. On 20 November 1963, during a European Cup match between Dukla Prague and Górnik Zabrze, he struck Dukla’s promising forward Rudolf Kučera in the head with his elbow, ending his football career.

== Career statistics ==
=== International ===
Appearances and goals by national team and year
National team	Year	Apps	Goals
Poland	1961	6	0
Poland	1962	8	0
Poland	1963	5	0
Poland	1964	5	0
Poland	1965	8	0
Poland	1966	8	1
Poland	1967	6	0
Poland	1968	6	0
Poland	1969	2	0
Poland	1970	2	0
Poland	1971	1	0
Total		57	1

== Honours ==
Górnik Zabrze

- Ekstraklasa: 1961, 1962–63, 1963–64, 1964–65, 1965–66, 1966–67, 1970–71, 1971–72
- Polish Cup: 1964–65, 1967–68, 1968–69, 1969–70, 1970–71, 1971–72
