= Stefan Florenski =

Polish footballer (1933–2020)

Personal information
- Full name: Stefan Józef Florenski
- Birth name: Ginter Florenski
- Date of birth: 17 December 1933
- Place of birth: Gleiwitz, Germany
- Date of death: 23 February 2020 (aged 86)
- Place of death: Hamm, Germany
- Height: 1.78 m (5 ft 10 in)
- Position: Defender

Senior career*
Years	Team	Apps	(Gls)
1946–1956	Sośnica Gliwice		
1956–1971	Górnik Zabrze	258	(2)
1971–1973	GKS Tychy		

International career
1957–1968	Poland	11	(0)
- * Club domestic league appearances and goals

Stefan Józef Florenski (born Ginter Florenski, 17 December 1933 – 23 February 2020) was a Polish footballer who played as a defender. He represented Górnik Zabrze for the majority of his career, and the Poland national team. He was born in Gleiwitz, Germany, now Poland.

His career started in a local club Sośnica Gliwice, and in 1956, he moved to Górnik Zabrze, one of strongest teams in Poland. In Górnik, he was nine times champion of Poland as well as five times winner of the Polish Cup. Regarded as one of the best defenders in the country, he was an expert on slide tackles.

Florenski played in 11 games for the national team. His debut took place on 29 September 1957 versus Bulgaria and the last game was the 1968 match against Ireland. He was also part of Poland's squad at the 1960 Summer Olympics, but he did not play in any matches.

== Honours ==
Górnik Zabrze

- Ekstraklasa: 1957, 1959, 1961, 1962–63, 1963–64, 1964–65, 1965–66, 1966–67, 1970–71
- Polish Cup: 1964–65, 1967–68, 1968–69, 1969–70, 1970–71
