= Erwin Wilczek =

Polish footballer and manager (1940–2021)

Personal information
- Full name: Erwin Feliks Wilczek
- Date of birth: 20 November 1940
- Place of birth: Antonienhütte, Silesia, Prussia, Germany (now Wirek, Poland)
- Date of death: 30 November 2021 (aged 81)
- Height: 1.68 m (5 ft 6 in)
- Positions: Midfielder; forward

Youth career
- 1950–1954: Wawel Wirek
- 1954–1958: Zryw Chorzów

Senior career*
Years	Team	Apps	(Gls)
1959–1972	Górnik Zabrze	293	(96)
1973–1975	Valenciennes	70	(43)
Total		363	(139)

International career
1961–1969	Poland	16	(2)

Managerial career
- 1977–1979: Valenciennes II
- 1979–1982: Valenciennes
- 1983–1987: AS Sogara
- 1989–1991: AS Sogara
- * Club domestic league appearances and goals

Erwin Feliks Wilczek (20 November 1940 – 30 November 2021) was a Polish professional footballer. He started his career as a forward, after some time he was moved to the midfield.

He holds the record for winning the most Polish domestic competitions as a player, with 15 official titles, all while playing for Górnik Zabrze.

== Career ==
Wilczek was born in Wirek, a district of Ruda Śląska. He began his career with local team Wawel Wirek. In 1954, he moved to Zryw Chorzów, before joining Górnik Zabrze in 1959, where he stayed until 1973. He made 293 Ekstraklasa appearances for Górnik, and 101 more in other competitions such as the Polish Cup or European cups. He scored a total of 96 league goals for the Silesian club. He won nine Polish top flight titles (1959, 1961, 1963–1967, 1971, 1972), won the Polish Cup six times (1965, 1968–1972), and reached the 1970 European Cup Winners' Cup final with Górnik.

Between 1961 and 1969, he was capped 16 times for the Poland national team, scoring two goals. In 1973, Wilczek moved to France, where he played for US Valenciennes, becoming the top scorer of the French Second Division.

After retiring, he became a scout for Valenciennes, before being appointed manager of their reserve team in 1977, and taking charge of the senior squad two years later. In the 1980s, he worked in Africa, among others for the team AS Sogara from Gabon.

== Honours ==
Górnik Zabrze

- Ekstraklasa: 1959, 1961, 1962–63, 1963–64, 1964–65, 1965–66, 1966–67, 1970–71, 1971–72
- Polish Cup: 1964–65, 1967–68, 1968–69, 1969–70, 1970–71, 1971–72
