= Szyguła =

Szyguła or Schygulla is a Polish surname. Notable people with the surname include:

- Hanna Schygulla (born 1943), German actress and singer
- Witold Szyguła (1940–2003), Polish footballer and manager
