= Zygfryd Szołtysik =

Polish footballer

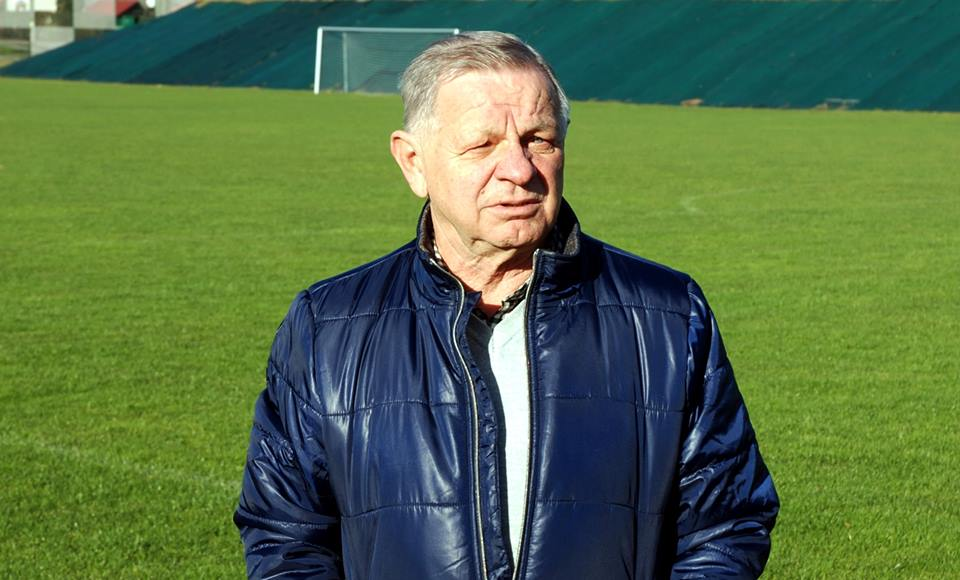

Personal information
- Date of birth: 24 October 1942 (age 84)
- Place of birth: Sucha Góra, Poland
- Height: 1.62 m (5 ft 4 in)
- Position: Midfielder

Youth career
- 1956–1961: Zryw Chorzów

Senior career*
Years	Team	Apps	(Gls)
1962–1974	Górnik Zabrze	307	(80)
1974–1975	Valenciennes	25	(2)
1975–1978	Górnik Zabrze	86	(11)
1978	Toronto Falcons		
1978–1984	Concordia Knurów		
1986–1987	Eintracht Hamm		
1987–1990	SVA Bockum Hovel		

International career
- Poland U18
1963–1972	Poland	46	(10)
Medal record
Men's football
Representing Poland
Olympic Games
Gold medal – first place	1972 Munich	Team
UEFA European Under-18 Championship
Runner-up	1961 Portugal
- * Club domestic league appearances and goals

Zygfryd Ludwik Szołtysik (born 24 October 1942) is a Polish former professional footballer who played as a midfielder, spending most of his career with Górnik Zabrze.

== Honours ==
Górnik Zabrze

- Ekstraklasa: 1962–63, 1963–64, 1964–65, 1965–66, 1966–67, 1970–71, 1971–72
- Polish Cup: 1964–65, 1967–68, 1968–69, 1969–70, 1970–71, 1971–72

Poland

- Olympic gold medal: 1972

Poland U18

- UEFA European Under-18 Championship runner-up: 1961
