= Gomola =

Gomola is a surname. Notable people with the surname include:

- Adam Gomola (born 1972), Polish ski mountaineer
- Jan Gomola (1941–2022), Polish footballer
- Roman Gomola (born 1973), Czech bobsledder
