= Hubert Skowronek =

Polish footballer and manager (1941–1979)

Personal information
- Full name: Hubert Paweł Skowronek
- Date of birth: 3 December 1941
- Place of birth: Gliwice, Poland
- Date of death: 6 January 1979 (aged 37)
- Place of death: Polkowice, Poland
- Height: 1.71 m (5 ft 7 in)
- Position: Attacking midfielder

Youth career
- 1955: WKKF Katowice

Senior career*
| Years | Team | Apps | (Gls) |
| 1956–1959 | Carbo Gliwice | | |
| 1959–1962 | Piast Gliwice | | |
| 1962–1967 | Śląsk Wrocław | | |
| 1967–1973 | Górnik Zabrze | 117 | (4) |
| 1973 | Wiener SC | | |
| 1973–1975 | Walka Makoszowy | | |

International career
| 1966 | Poland | 1 | (0) |

Managerial career
- Walka Makoszowy (assistant)
- 1975–1976: Stal Stalowa Wola
- 1977: Piast Gliwice
- Zastal Zielona Góra
- * Club domestic league appearances and goals

Hubert Paweł Skowronek (3 December 1941 – 6 January 1979) was a Polish footballer and manager.

With Górnik Zabrze, he won two Polish league titles in 1971 and 1972, and played in the 1970 European Cup Winners' Cup Final. He also played in one match for the Poland national football team on 3 December 1966, in a scoreless friendly against Israel.

He went on to be manager for a host of second-tier clubs.

== Honours ==
Górnik Zabrze

- Ekstraklasa: 1970–71, 1971–72
- Polish Cup: 1967–68, 1968–69, 1969–70, 1970–71, 1971–72

== Bibliography ==
- Andrzej Gowarzewski; Joachim Waloszek (2009), 11. część serii Kolekcja Klubów: Górnik Zabrze. 60 lat prawdziwej historii (1948-2008) (in Polish), Katowice: GiA
- Filip Podolski, Śląsk Wrocław. 30 sezonów w ekstraklasie (in Polish)
- Grzegorz Muzia; Andrzej Potocki (2012), Gliwicki futbol. Zarys dziejów (in Polish), Gliwice: Muzeum w Gliwicach
