= Alfred Olek =

Polish footballer

Personal information
- Full name: Alfred Tomasz Olek
- Date of birth: 23 July 1940
- Place of birth: Świętochłowice, Poland
- Date of death: 10 March 2007 (aged 66)
- Place of death: Pilchowice, Poland
- Height: 1.72 m (5 ft 8 in)
- Position: Midfielder

Senior career*
Years	Team	Apps	(Gls)
1956–1964	Czarni Chropaczów		
1964–1966	GKS Świętochłowice		
1966–1971	Górnik Zabrze	114	(4)
1971–1973	Hamilton Academical	15	(1)
1973–1977	Concordia Knurów		
1977–1979	LZS Gierałtowice		

International career
1970	Poland	1	(0)
- * Club domestic league appearances and goals

Alfred Tomasz Olek (23 July 1940 – 10 March 2007), was a Polish footballer, who played for Górnik Zabrze, Scottish club Hamilton Academical and once for the Poland national team.

Olek was one of three Polish international players who moved to Hamilton in 1971, the others being Roman Strzałkowski and goalkeeper Witold Szygula. A contemporary report in The Herald newspaper described it as "one of the strangest transfer deals recorded in Scottish football". The deal was arranged by the Hamilton chairman, Jan Stepek, who was a Polish businessman. Alan Dick, who was the Hamilton club secretary at the time, later reflected that the three players did not stay for very long because they were "clearly too good for us".

== Honours ==
Górnik Zabrze

- Ekstraklasa: 1966–67, 1970–71
- Polish Cup: 1967–68, 1968–69, 1969–70, 1970–71
