= Władysław Szaryński =

Polish footballer

Personal information
- Date of birth: 17 January 1947 (age 79)
- Place of birth: Szczecin, Poland
- Height: 1.66 m (5 ft 5 in)
- Position: Forward

Senior career*
Years	Team	Apps	(Gls)
1959–1966	Arkonia Szczecin		
1966–1968	Zawisza Bydgoszcz		
1969	ROW Rybnik		
1969–1974	Górnik Zabrze		
1974–1979	Zagłębie Sosnowiec		
1979–1980	Dunkerque		
1980–1981	RFC Hautrage		

International career
1970	Poland	2	(0)

Managerial career
- Stal Stalowa Wola
- Stal Stalowa Wola
- 1995: Polonia Bytom
- Zagłębie Sosnowiec
- Zagłębianka Dąbrowa Górnicza
- Piast Nowa Ruda
- Andaluzja Piekary Śląskie
- Kalwarianka Kalwaria Z.
- Sandecja Nowy Sącz
- * Club domestic league appearances and goals

Władysław Szaryński (born 17 January 1947) is a Polish former professional football manager and player.

He played in two matches for the Poland national football team in 1970.

== Honours ==
Górnik Zabrze

- Ekstraklasa: 1970–71, 1971–72
- Polish Cup: 1969–70, 1970–71, 1971–72

Zagłębie Sosnowiec

- Polish Cup: 1976–77, 1977–78
- Intertoto Cup: 1975
