= Roman Strzałkowski =

Polish footballer

Personal information
- Full name: Roman Franciszek Strzałkowski
- Date of birth: 6 October 1941
- Place of birth: Łagiewniki, Bytom, Poland
- Date of death: 5 March 1977 (aged 35)
- Place of death: Bytom, Poland
- Position: Centre half

Youth career
- –1959: ŁKS Łagiewniki
- 1959–1960: Zagłębie Sosnowiec

Senior career*
Years	Team	Apps	(Gls)
1960–1971	Stal/Zagłębie Sosnowiec	176	(2)
1971–1972	Hamilton Academical	18	(1)
1972–1974	Szombierki Bytom	21	(0)
Total		215	(3)

International career
1966–1970	Poland	18	(1)
- * Club domestic league appearances and goals

Roman Franciszek Strzałkowski (6 October 1941 – 5 March 1977) was a Polish footballer who played as a centre half. He signed for Scottish club Hamilton Academical in June 1971, alongside fellow Polish internationals Alfred Olek and Witold Szygula. They were "the first players from behind the Iron Curtain […] to play in Britain." The deal was orchestrated by Hamilton's chairman Jan Stepek, who was himself Polish, in return for electronic goods being sent to Poland. Strzałkowski also played in Poland for Zagłębie and Szombierki Bytom.

== Honours ==
Zagłębie Sosnowiec

- Polish Cup: 1962–63
