= Marian Szeja =

Polish footballer

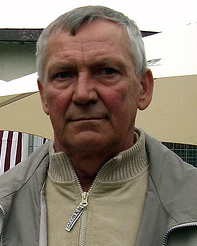

Personal information
- Full name: Marian Henryk Szeja
- Date of birth: 20 August 1941
- Place of birth: Siemianowice Śląskie, Poland
- Date of death: 25 February 2015 (aged 73)
- Place of death: Wałbrzych, Poland
- Height: 1.83 m (6 ft 0 in)
- Position: Goalkeeper

Youth career
- 1955–1960: Unia Kędzierzyn

Senior career*
Years	Team	Apps	(Gls)
1960–1973	Zagłębie Wałbrzych		
1973–1974	Metz	4	(0)
1974–1980	Auxerre	190	(0)

International career
1965–1973	Poland	15	(0)
Medal record
Men's football
Representing Poland
Olympic Games
Gold medal – first place	1972 Munich	Team
- * Club domestic league appearances and goals

Marian Henryk Szeja (20 August 1941 – 25 February 2015) was a Polish professional footballer who played as a goalkeeper. He was the substitute player for the Poland national team at the 1972 Summer Olympics, where Poland won gold medal. Szeja died on 25 February 2015 at the age of 73.

== Honours ==
Auxerre

- Ligue 2: 1979–80
- Coupe de France runner-up: 1978–79

Poland

- Olympic gold medal: 1972
