= Ryszard Szymczak =

Polish footballer

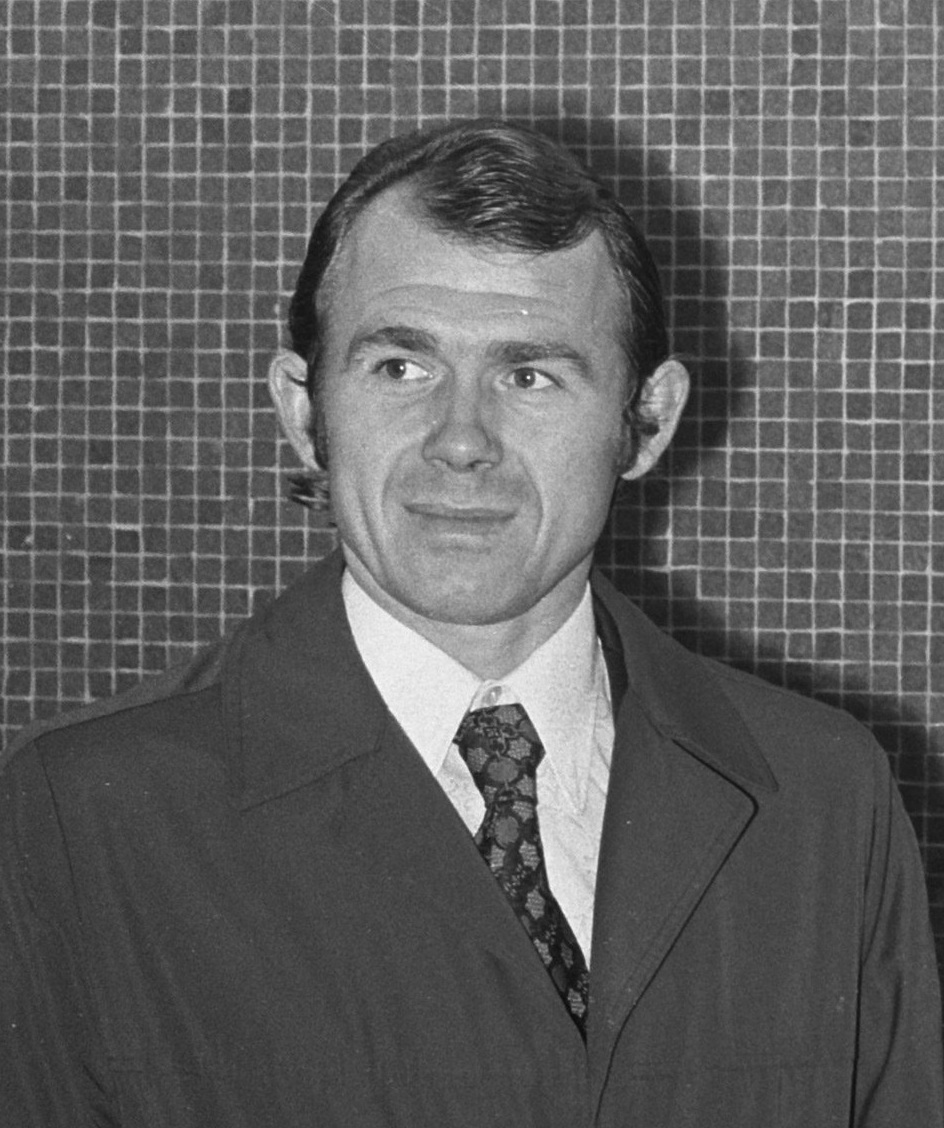
- Ryszard Szymczak in 1974

Personal information
- Full name: Ryszard Władysław Szymczak
- Date of birth: 14 December 1944
- Place of birth: Pruszków, Poland
- Date of death: 7 December 1996 (aged 51)
- Place of death: Warsaw, Poland
- Height: 1.66 m (5 ft 5 1/2 in)
- Position: Striker

Youth career
- 1956–1961: Znicz Pruszków

Senior career*
Years	Team	Apps	(Gls)
1962–1974	Gwardia Warsaw	213	(69)
1974–1977	FC Boulogne	77	(24)
1977–1978	Gwardia Warsaw	38	(6)

International career
1972	Poland	2	(0)
Medal record
Men's football
Representing Poland
Olympic Games
Gold medal – first place	1972 Munich	Team
- * Club domestic league appearances and goals

Ryszard Władysław Szymczak (14 December 1944 – 7 December 1996) was a Polish professional footballer who played as a striker.

On the national level, he played for Poland national team (two matches) and was a participant at the 1972 Summer Olympics, where his team won the gold medal.

== Honours ==
Poland

- Olympic gold medal: 1972

Individual

- Ekstraklasa top scorer: 1971–72
