= Zagłębie Wałbrzych =

- Full name: GKS Zagłębie Wałbrzych
- Nickname: Thorez
- Founded: 1945; 80 years ago (as KS Julia Biały Kamień); 2006; 19 years ago (re-founded)
- Ground: "Old Zagłębie" Stadium
- Chairman: Mariusz Pośledniak
- Manager: Krzysztof Śmieszek
- League: Klasa A Wałbrzych I
- 2023–24: Klasa A Wałbrzych I, 10th of 16
Home colours

Zagłębie Wałbrzych is a Polish multi-sports club in the south-western city of Wałbrzych. The club, based in the Biały Kamień neighbourhood, is the most famous for its football team, which competed in the Polish top division in the past.

== History ==
The club was founded in 1945 as KS Julia Biały Kamień, near the Julia coal mine. Later, immigrant workers from France and Belgium renamed the club to Thorez, after Maurice Thorez, a French communist leader. The name was disliked by most fans and was changed in 1968 into Zagłębie, which means coal basin in Polish, as Wałbrzych was an important center of mining.

In 1968, Zagłębie Wałbrzych won promotion to the Ekstraklasa, and in the 1970–71 season, it finished in the 3rd spot, after Górnik Zabrze and Legia Warsaw. Zagłębie participated in the games of the UEFA Cup, advancing to the second round. In the first round, it beat Czechoslovak team FK Teplice (1–0, 3–2), in the second round it lost to Romanian side UT Arad (1–1, 1–2). Team's most famous player is goalkeeper Marian Szeja, participant of the 1972 Olympic Games.

After the 1973–74 season, Zagłębie was relegated from the top division and has never returned. A difficult financial situation of sports clubs in Wałbrzych meant that in the early 1990s the club merged with fierce rivals Górnik Wałbrzych much to the shock of both sets of fans after over 40 years of rivalry. The new merged club then became "KP Wałbrzych", then "KP Górnik/Zagłębie Wałbrzych". Matches were played at Zagłębie's stadium but eventually the Zagłębie part was dropped from the name and the club de facto ceased to exist.

On 6 April 2006, the "Stowarzyszenie GKS Zagłębie Wałbrzych", was created, reactivating the football section of the club. From 2008, the team participates in the regional games of Lower Silesia.

In 2019, a women's football section was founded.

== Honours ==
- I liga
  - Third place: 1970–71
- Polish Cup
  - Quarter-finalists: 1962–63, 1992–93
- UEFA Cup
  - Round of 32: 1971–72

== European record ==
| Season | Tournament | Round | Opponent | Home | Away | Overall |
|---|---|---|---|---|---|---|
| 1971 | UEFA Intertoto Cup | Group stage (group 6) | (West Germany) Eintracht Braunschweig | 0–1 | 0–1 | 3rd place |
| 1971 | UEFA Intertoto Cup | Group stage (group 6) | (Sweden) Malmö FF | 2–0 | 0–4 | 3rd place |
| 1971 | UEFA Intertoto Cup | Group stage (group 6) | (Switzerland) Young Boys Bern | 0–2 | 1–0 | 3rd place |
| 1971–72 | UEFA Cup | 1R | (Czechoslovakia) Union Teplice | 1–0 | 3–2 | 4–2 |
| 1971–72 | UEFA Cup | 2R | (Romania) UT Arad | 1–1 | 1–2 (a.e.t.) | 2–3 (a.e.t.) |

== Notable players ==
Marian Szeja, Joachim Stachuła and Stanisław Paździor have all played in the Poland national football team.
