= Bent Schmidt Hansen =

Danish footballer (1946-2013)

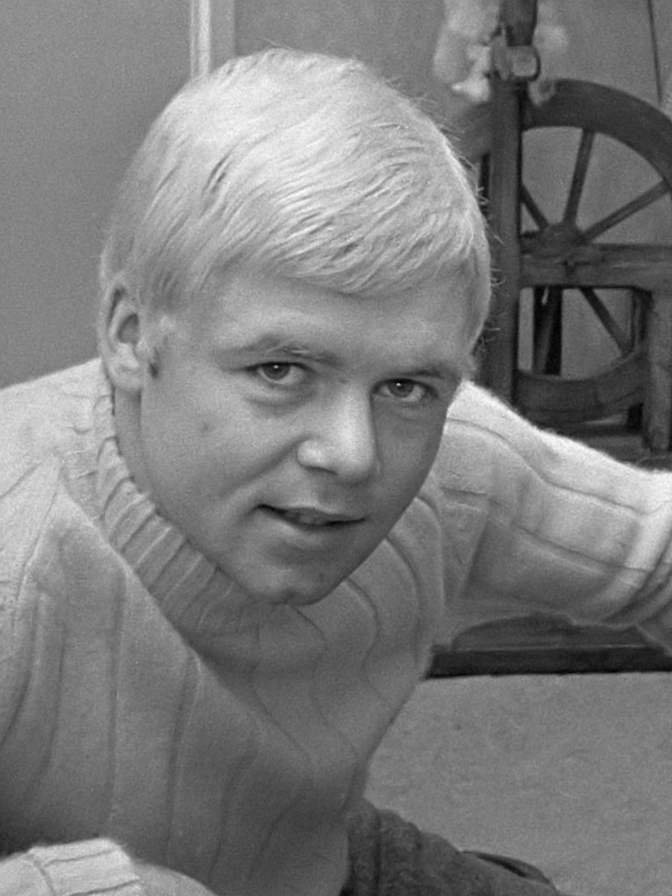
- Schmidt Hansen (1969)

Personal information
- Full name: Bent Schmidt Hansen
- Date of birth: 27 November 1946
- Place of birth: Horsens, Denmark
- Date of death: 1 July 2013 (aged 66)
- Height: 1.70 m (5 ft 7 in)
- Position: Winger

Senior career*
Years	Team	Apps	(Gls)
1964–1967	Horsens fS	140	(23)
1967–1975	PSV Eindhoven	212	(52)

International career
1966–1966	Denmark U-21	5	(0)
1966–1967	Denmark	8	(0)
- * Club domestic league appearances and goals

Bent Schmidt Hansen (27 November 1946 – 1 July 2013) was a Danish professional football winger who played for PSV Eindhoven during an injury-shortened career.

== Club career ==
Schmidt Hansen played for Horsens fS before joining Dutch side PSV Eindhoven in 1967. He would play over 200 league games for them before a persisting back injury cut short his playing career.

== International career ==
Schmidt Hansen made his debut for Denmark in a July 1966 friendly match against England and has earned a total of 8 caps, scoring no goals.

His final international was a June 1967 friendly match against Sweden.

== Death ==
Schmidt Hansen died on 1 July 2013. He was survived by his wife and three children.
