= John Olsen (footballer) =

Norwegian footballer (1928-2001)

Personal information
- Date of birth: 30 December 1928
- Date of death: 28 June 2001 (aged 72)

International career
Years	Team	Apps	(Gls)
1954	Norway	1	(0)

John Olsen (30 December 1928 – 28 June 2001) was a Norwegian footballer. He played in one match for the Norway national football team in 1954.
