= Frans Vermeyen =

Belgian footballer

- Vermeyen with Lierse

Personal information
- Date of birth: 25 March 1943
- Place of birth: Turnhout, Belgium
- Date of death: 18 January 2014 (aged 70)
- Place of death: Turnhout, Belgium
- Position: Striker

Youth career
- –1959: Hand in Hand Turnhout

Senior career*
Years	Team	Apps	(Gls)
1959–1973	Lierse SK	411	(122)
1973–1975	FC Antwerp	29	(5)

International career
1963–1965	Belgium	6	(2)
- * Club domestic league appearances and goals

Frans Vermeyen (25 March 1943 – 18 January 2014) was a Belgian footballer who primarily played as a striker.

== Club career ==
Vermeyen joined Lierse SK in 1959, aged 16. He became a club icon in 14 years and 411 games with the club. A striker-turned-midfielder, he left them for FC Antwerp in 1973 and finished his career at Witgoor.

== Death ==
Frans Vermeyen died in hospital care following a stroke on 18 January 2014, aged 70, in his hometown of Turnhout.
