= Witold Szyguła =

Polish footballer and manager

Personal information
- Full name: Witold Henryk Szyguła
- Date of birth: 22 November 1940
- Place of birth: Chorzów, Poland
- Date of death: 4 September 2003 (aged 62)
- Height: 1.80 m (5 ft 11 in)
- Position: Goalkeeper

Senior career*
Years	Team	Apps	(Gls)
1962–1971	Zagłębie Sosnowiec	187	(0)
1971–1972	Hamilton Academical	27	(0)
1972–1974	ROW Rybnik	51	(0)
Total		265	(0)

International career
1963–1970	Poland	3	(0)

Managerial career
- 1977: Resovia Rzeszów
- AKS Chorzów
- MCKS Czeladź
- ŁTS Łabędy
- 1982–1983: Stilon Gorzów Wielkopolski
- Górnik Libiąż
- Szombierki Bytom
- 1992: Zagłębie Sosnowiec
- * Club domestic league appearances and goals

Witold Henryk Szyguła (22 November 1940 – 4 September 2003) was a Polish footballer and manager who played as a goalkeeper.

He signed for Scottish club Hamilton Academical in June 1971, alongside fellow Polish internationals Alfred Olek and Roman Strzałkowski. They were "the first players from behind the Iron Curtain […] to play in Britain." The deal was orchestrated by Hamilton's chairman Jan Stepek, who was himself Polish, in return for electronic goods being sent to Poland. Szyguła also played in Poland for Zagłębie.

== Honours ==
Zagłębie Sosnowiec

- Polish Cup: 1961–62, 1962–63
