= Francesco Cappelli =

Italian footballer

Personal information
- Date of birth: 17 September 1943 (age 83)
- Place of birth: Barberino Val d'Elsa, Italy
- Height: 1.82 m (5 ft 11 1/2 in)
- Position: Defender

Senior career*
Years	Team	Apps	(Gls)
1962–1964	Poggibonsi	49	(0)
1964–1965	Tevere Roma	23	(0)
1965–1972	Roma	67	(0)
1966–1967	→ Venezia (loan)	13	(0)
1973	Taranto	10	(0)
- * Club domestic league appearances and goals

Francesco Cappelli (born 17 September 1943 in Barberino Val d'Elsa) is a retired Italian professional football player.

He played 5 seasons (80 games, no goals) in the Serie A for S.S.C. Venezia and A.S. Roma.

== Honours ==
- Coppa Italia winner: 1968/69.
- Anglo-Italian Cup: 1971-1972
