= Mário Campos (footballer) =

Portuguese footballer

Personal information
- Full name: Mário Alberto Domingos Campos
- Date of birth: 29 August 1947 (age 79)
- Place of birth: Torres Vedras, Portugal
- Position: Midfielder

Youth career
- Académica

Senior career*
Years	Team	Apps	(Gls)
1965–1977	Académica	189	(10)

International career
1969	Portugal	1	(0)
- * Club domestic league appearances and goals

Mário Alberto Domingos Campos (born 29 August 1947) is a former Portuguese footballer who played as a midfielder for Académica and the Portuguese national team in the 1960s and 1970s.

== Career ==
Born in Torres Vedras on 29 August 1947, Campos made his debut Académica on 28 November 1965, aged 18, playing a total of 238 matches. On 10 December 1969, the 22-year-old Campos earned his first (and only) international cap for Portugal in a friendly match against England in London, which ended in a 1–0 loss.

After graduating in Medicine from the University of Coimbra, Campos became the Director of the Nephrology Service at the Coimbra University Hospitals.
