= Jan Banaś =

Polish footballer (born 1943)

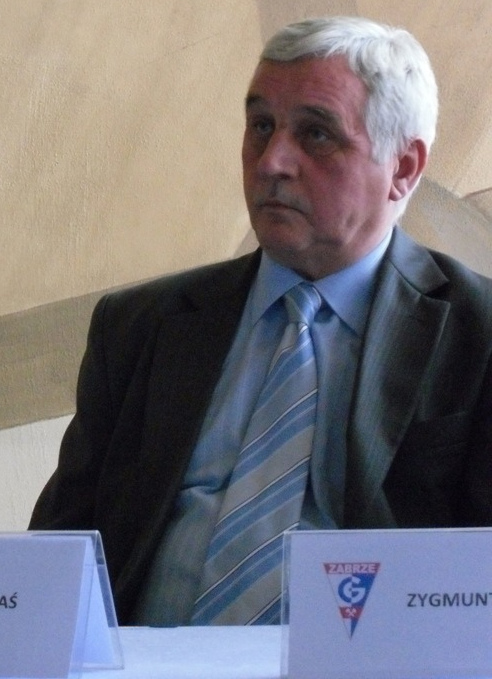

Personal information
- Full name: Heinz-Dieter Banas
- Date of birth: 29 March 1943 (age 83)
- Place of birth: Berlin, Germany
- Height: 1.71 m (5 ft 7 1/2 in)
- Position: Forward

Youth career
- 1956–1958: AKS Mikołów
- 1958–1959: WKKF Katowice
- 1959–1962: Zryw Chorzów

Senior career*
Years	Team	Apps	(Gls)
1962–1969	Polonia Bytom	145	(50)
1969–1975	Górnik Zabrze	124	(35)
1975	Wisła Chicago		
1975–1976	Polonia Chicago		
1976	AAC Eagles		
1976	Atlético Español	9	(0)

International career
1964–1973	Poland	31	(7)

Managerial career
- ES Saintes (player-manager)
- CA de Mantes-la-Ville (player-manager)
- Szombierki Bytom
- * Club domestic league appearances and goals

Jan Banaś (born Hans Dieter Banas; 29 March 1943), nicknamed Bubi, is a Polish former professional footballer who played as a forward.

He began his career as a youngster playing for AKS Mikołów (1956–59) before moving to Zryw Chorzów in 1959–62, Polonia Bytom (1962–69) and Górnik Zabrze (1969–75). Between his first call-up for Poland in 1964 and his last in 1973, he earned 31 caps, scoring seven goals (or eight, if the controversial goal in the 1973 win over England is credited to him). Aged 32, he was allowed to move to the United States, and then played in a string of countries including Mexico (with Atlético Español), Belgium, and France well after his fortieth birthday.

Recently he has been coaching low-level Silesian clubs, including Szombierki Bytom.

In 1966, together with Jan Liberda and Norbert Pogrzeba, Banaś decided to illegally migrate to Western Europe; they all escaped before Polonia's match IFK Norrköping. He was unable to achieve much success even in the German Oberliga, and half a year later he returned and was pardoned by the Polish Football Association. After return, he changed his name to the Polish form, and took the name Jan in March 1967.

== International statistics ==
Appearances and goals by national team and year
National team	Year	Apps	Goals
Poland
Poland	1964	4	1
Poland	1965	5	0
Poland	1966	5	0
Poland	1970	3	2
Poland	1971	4	2
Poland	1972	2	2
Poland	1973	8	0
Total		31	7

== Honours ==
Górnik Zabrze

- Ekstraklasa: 1970–71, 1971–72
- Polish Cup: 1969–70, 1970–71, 1971–72
