= Włodzimierz Lubański =

Polish footballer (born 1947)

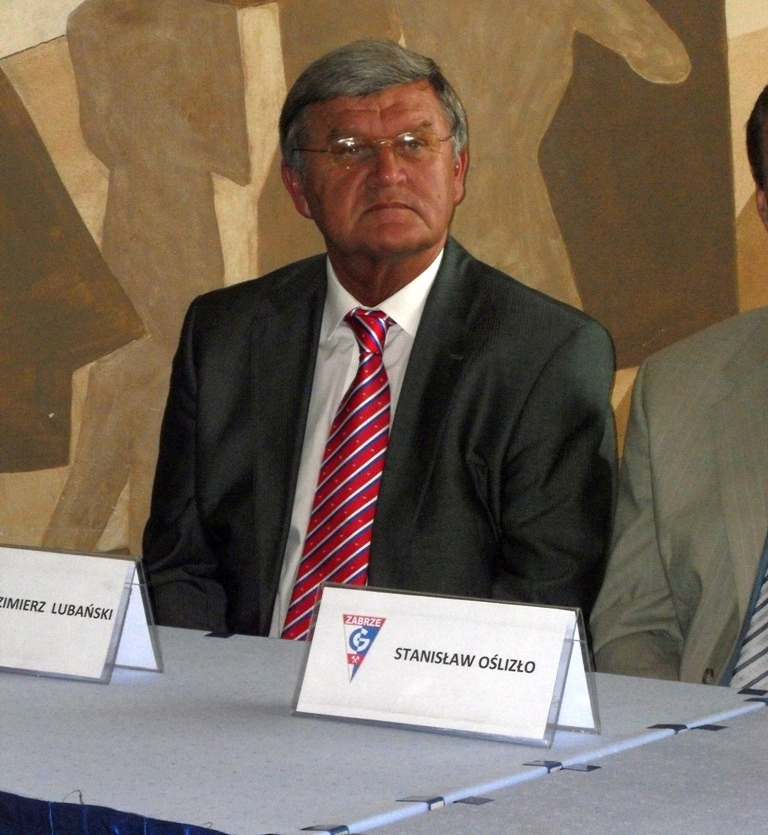
- Lubański in 2011

Personal information
- Full name: Włodzimierz Leonard Lubański
- Date of birth: 28 February 1947 (age 79)
- Place of birth: Gliwice, Silesian Voivodeship, Republic of Poland
- Height: 1.78 m (5 ft 10 in)
- Position: Forward

Youth career
- 1957-1958: Sośnica Gliwice
- 1958-1962: GKS Gliwice

Senior career*
Years	Team	Apps	(Gls)
1963–1975	Górnik Zabrze	234	(155)
1975–1982	Lokeren	196	(82)
1982–1983	Valenciennes	31	(28)
1983–1985	Stade Quimpérois	58	(14)
1985–1986	Mechelen	1	(0)
Total		520	(279)

International career
1963–1980	Poland	75	(48)

Managerial career
- 1984–1985: Stade Quimpérois
- 1985–1986: Mechelen
- 1987–1988: Lokeren
- 1990: PAS Giannina
Medal record
Men's football
Representing Poland
Olympic Games
Gold medal – first place	1972 Munich	Team
- * Club domestic league appearances and goals

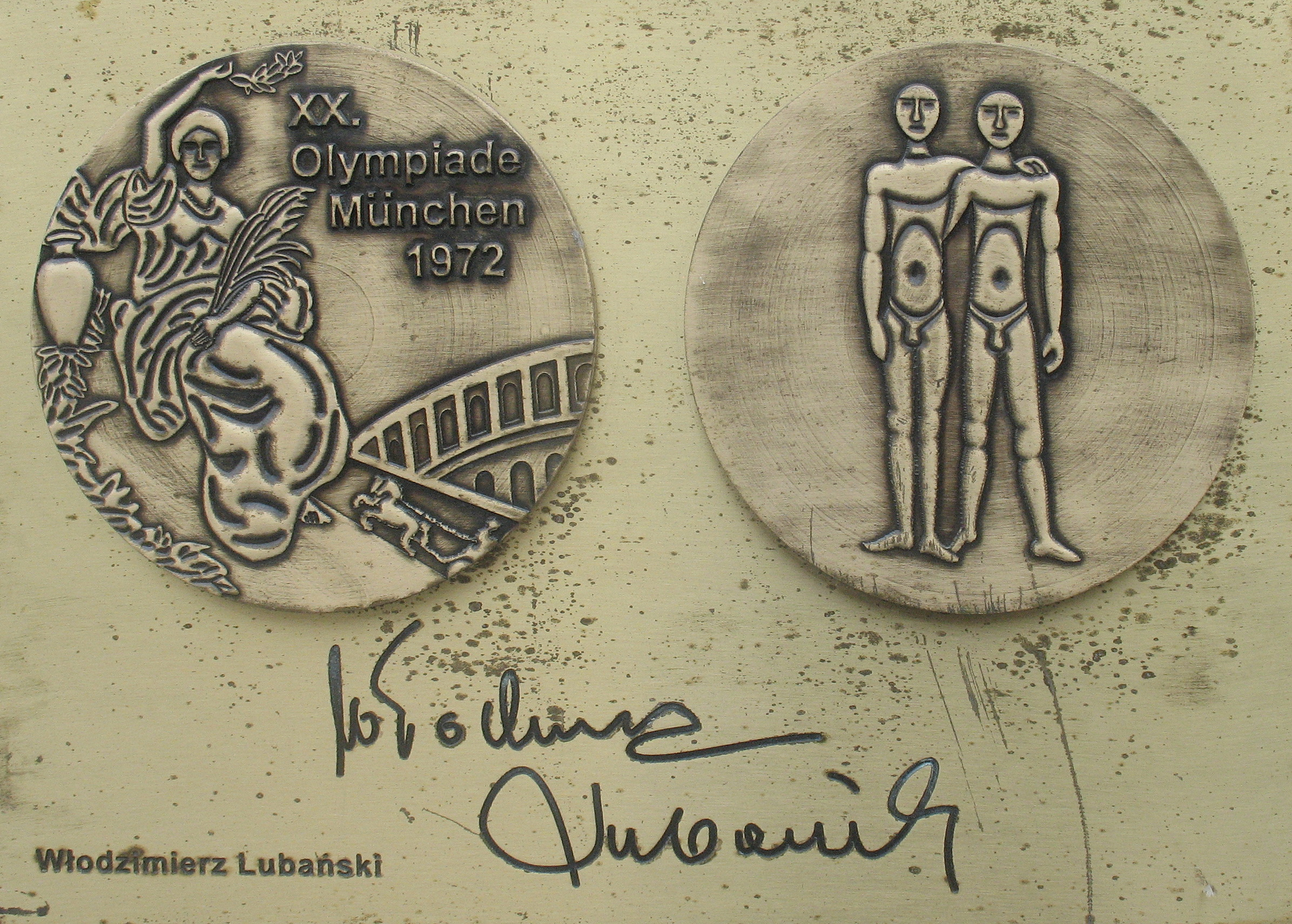
Copy of W. Lubański medal and autograph in Avenue Sport Stars in Dziwnów

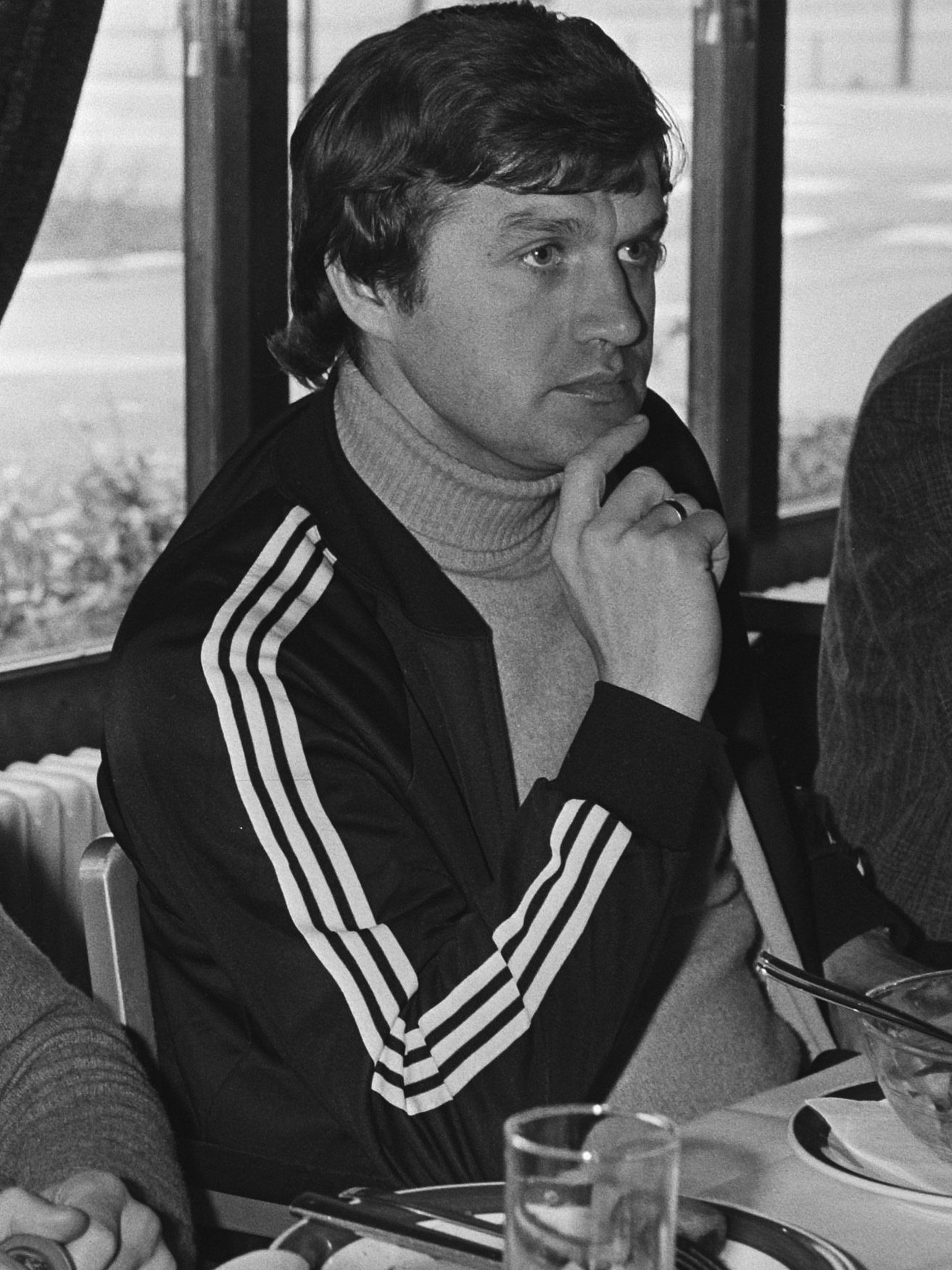
Lubański in 1981

Włodzimierz 'Włodek' Leonard Lubański (Polish pronunciation: [vwɔˈd͡ʑimiɛʐ luˈbaɲskʲi]; born 28 February 1947) is a Polish former professional footballer who played as a striker. He is the second-highest all-time goal scorer for the Poland national team, behind Robert Lewandowski, and the youngest-ever player to appear for Poland, making his debut at the age of 16 years and 188 days. For his national team, Lubański amassed 75 caps between 1963 and 1980, scoring 48 goals.

== Life and career ==
Born in Gliwice in 1947, he started his football career at the age of ten in Sośnica Gliwice's junior team. Between 1958 and 1962, he was part of the GKS Gliwice's junior squad and in 1963 he started playing football professionally in Górnik Zabrze. He won the Polish Championship seven times with Górnik Zabrze in 1963, 1964, 1965, 1966, 1967, 1971 and 1972. Lubański is the youngest scorer in the history of the European Cup (now known as the UEFA Champions League), scoring against Czech side Dukla Prague in the leg of their tie in the first round of the competition on 13 November 1963, aged 16 years and 258 days.

Between 1975 and 1982, he played for Belgian side Lokeren before moving to French outfit Valenciennes FC in 1982, where he remained for a year.

He won the gold medal at the 1972 Summer Olympics in the men's football team competition with Poland.

In 1972, he was awarded the title of Merited Master of Sport of the USSR.

He participated at the 1978 FIFA World Cup, finishing fifth with his national team.

Lubański was vice-chairman of Polonia Warsaw for three months.

In 1997, he received the Officer's Cross of the Order of Polonia Restituta for his "outstanding contributions to the development of sport in Poland".

In 2015, he was awarded the Commander's Cross of the Order of Merit of the Republic of Poland.

== Personal life ==
In 1968, he married Grażyna (née Loreto) with whom he has two children: a son Michał and a daughter Małgorzata.

Lubański is the subject of a number of books including Ja, Lubański by Krzysztof Wyrzykowski (1990), Włodek Lubański. Legenda polskiego futbolu by Włodzimierz Lubański and Przemysław Słowiński (2008) and Życie jak dobry mecz by Włodzimierz Lubański and Michał Olszański (2016).

== Career statistics ==
=== Club ===
Appearances and goals by club, season and competition
Club	Season	League			National cup (Note: Includes Polish Cup, Belgian Cup)		Continental		Total	
Club	Season	Division	Apps	Goals	Apps	Goals	Apps	Goals	Apps	Goals
Górnik Zabrze	1962–63	Ekstraklasa	8	4	1	0	—		9	4
Górnik Zabrze	1963–64	Ekstraklasa	23	12	1	0	4	1	28	13
Górnik Zabrze	1964–65	Ekstraklasa	13	9	2	3	3	1	18	13
Górnik Zabrze	1965–66	Ekstraklasa	18	23	5	7	2	3	25	33
Górnik Zabrze	1966–67	Ekstraklasa	25	18	1	1	5	3	31	22
Górnik Zabrze	1967–68	Ekstraklasa	24	24	4	6	6	4	34	34
Górnik Zabrze	1968–69	Ekstraklasa	23	22	7	7	—		30	29
Górnik Zabrze	1969–70	Ekstraklasa	23	12	5	4	10	7	38	23
Górnik Zabrze	1970–71	Ekstraklasa	21	10	4	6	7	8	32	24
Górnik Zabrze	1971–72	Ekstraklasa	25	14	5	6	2	1	32	21
Górnik Zabrze	1972–73	Ekstraklasa	18	2	—		4	5	22	7
Górnik Zabrze	1973–74	Ekstraklasa	1	0	—		—		1	0
Górnik Zabrze	1974–75	Ekstraklasa	12	5	—		—		12	5
Górnik Zabrze	Total		234	155	35	40	43	34	312	225
Lokeren	1975–76	Belgian First Division	34	17	2	1	—		36	18
Lokeren	1976–77	Belgian First Division	29	11	3	2	3	1	32	14
Lokeren	1977–78	Belgian First Division	31	15	5	4	—		36	19
Lokeren	1978–79	Belgian First Division	32	12	4	4	—		36	16
Lokeren	1979–80	Belgian First Division	28	15	3	1	—		31	16
Lokeren	1980–81	Belgian First Division	24	8	2	2	5	0	31	10
Lokeren	1981–82	Belgian First Division	18	4	1	0	1	0	20	4
Lokeren	Total		196	82	20	14	9	1	225	97
Valenciennes	1982–83	Division 2	31	28	—		—		31	28
Quimper	1983–84	Division 2	33	7	—		—		33	7
Quimper	1984–85	Division 2	25	7	—		—		25	7
Quimper	Total		58	14	—		—		58	14
Mechelen	1985–86	Belgian Second Division	1	0	—		—		1	0
Career total			520	279	55	54	52	34	627	367

=== International ===
Appearances and goals by national team and year
National team	Year	Apps	Goals
Poland
Poland	1963	3	1
Poland	1964	4	2
Poland	1965	2	5
Poland	1966	6	1
Poland	1967	7	3
Poland	1968	6	6
Poland	1969	8	10
Poland	1970	7	2
Poland	1971	5	4
Poland	1972	9	3
Poland	1973	5	7
Poland	1976	1	0
Poland	1977	3	2
Poland	1978	8	1
Poland	1980	1	1
Total		75	48

Scores and results list Poland's goal tally first, score column indicates score after each Lubański goal.

List of international goals scored by Włodzimierz Lubański
No.	Date	Venue	Opponent	Score	Result	Competition
1	4 September 1963	Florian Krygier Stadium, Szczecin, Poland	Norway	3–0	9–0	Friendly
2	27 September 1964	Mithatpaşa Stadium, Istanbul, Turkey	Turkey	1–0	3–2	Friendly
3	25 October 1964	Dalymount Park, Dublin, Republic of Ireland	Republic of Ireland	1–0	2–3	Friendly
4	24 October 1965	Florian Krygier Stadium, Szczecin, Poland	Finland	1–0	7–0	1966 FIFA World Cup qualification
5	24 October 1965	Florian Krygier Stadium, Szczecin, Poland	Finland	2–0	7–0	1966 FIFA World Cup qualification
6	24 October 1965	Florian Krygier Stadium, Szczecin, Poland	Finland	3–0	7–0	1966 FIFA World Cup qualification
7	24 October 1965	Florian Krygier Stadium, Szczecin, Poland	Finland	6–0	7–0	1966 FIFA World Cup qualification
8	1 November 1965	Stadio Olimpico, Rome, Italy	Italy	1–5	1–6	1966 FIFA World Cup qualification
9	3 May 1966	Silesian Stadium, Chorzów, Poland	Hungary	1–1	1–1	Friendly
10	21 May 1967	Silesian Stadium, Chorzów, Poland	Belgium	1–0	3–1	UEFA Euro 1968 qualifying
11	21 May 1967	Silesian Stadium, Chorzów, Poland	Belgium	2–0	3–1	UEFA Euro 1968 qualifying
12	4 August 1967	Central Lenin Stadium, Moscow, Soviet Union	Soviet Union	1–2	1–2	1968 Summer Olympics qualification
13	24 April 1968	Silesian Stadium, Chorzów, Poland	Turkey	2–0	8–0	Friendly
14	24 April 1968	Silesian Stadium, Chorzów, Poland	Turkey	3–0	8–0	Friendly
15	24 April 1968	Silesian Stadium, Chorzów, Poland	Turkey	7–0	8–0	Friendly
16	15 May 1968	Dalymount Park, Dublin, Republic of Ireland	Republic of Ireland	1–0	2–2	Friendly
17	9 June 1968	Ullevaal Stadion, Oslo, Norway	Norway	6–1	6–1	Friendly
18	30 October 1968	Silesian Stadium, Chorzów, Poland	Republic of Ireland	1–0	1–0	Friendly
19	20 April 1969	Municipal Stadium, Kraków, Poland	Luxembourg	1–0	8–1	1970 FIFA World Cup qualification
20	20 April 1969	Municipal Stadium, Kraków, Poland	Luxembourg	2–0	8–1	1970 FIFA World Cup qualification
21	20 April 1969	Municipal Stadium, Kraków, Poland	Luxembourg	3–0	8–1	1970 FIFA World Cup qualification
22	20 April 1969	Municipal Stadium, Kraków, Poland	Luxembourg	7–1	8–1	1970 FIFA World Cup qualification
23	20 April 1969	Municipal Stadium, Kraków, Poland	Luxembourg	8–1	8–1	1970 FIFA World Cup qualification
24	30 April 1969	19 Mayıs Stadium, Ankara, Turkey	Turkey	1–0	3–1	Friendly
25	27 August 1969	ŁKS Stadium, Łódź, Poland	Norway	1–0	6–1	Friendly
26	27 August 1969	ŁKS Stadium, Łódź, Poland	Norway	5–0	6–1	Friendly
27	7 September 1969	Silesian Stadium, Chorzów, Poland	Netherlands	2–1	2–1	1970 FIFA World Cup qualification
28	12 October 1969	Stade Josy Barthel, Luxembourg, Luxembourg	Luxembourg	4–1	5–1	1970 FIFA World Cup qualification
29	2 September 1970	10th-Anniversary Stadium, Warsaw, Poland	Denmark	1–0	5–0	Friendly
30	14 October 1970	Silesian Stadium, Chorzów, Poland	Albania	2–0	3–0	UEFA Euro 1972 qualifying
31	5 May 1971	Stade Olympique de la Pontaise, Lausanne, Switzerland	Switzerland	4–1	4–2	Friendly
32	22 September 1971	Municipal Stadium, Kraków, Poland	Turkey	2–0	5–1	UEFA Euro 1972 qualifying
33	22 September 1971	Municipal Stadium, Kraków, Poland	Turkey	4–0	5–1	UEFA Euro 1972 qualifying
34	22 September 1971	Municipal Stadium, Kraków, Poland	Turkey	5–1	5–1	UEFA Euro 1972 qualifying
35	16 April 1972	Lokomotic Stadium, Stara Zagora, Bulgaria	Bulgaria	1–0	1–3	1972 Summer Olympics qualification
36	30 August 1972	Jahnstadion, Regensburg, West Germany	Ghana	1–0	4–0	1972 Summer Olympics
37	8 September 1972	Frankenstadion, Nuremberg, West Germany	Morocco	2–0	5–0	1972 Summer Olympics
38	20 March 1973	ŁKS Stadium, Łódź, Poland	United States	1–0	4–0	Friendly
39	20 March 1973	ŁKS Stadium, Łódź, Poland	United States	2–0	4–0	Friendly
40	20 March 1973	ŁKS Stadium, Łódź, Poland	United States	4–0	4–0	Friendly
41	13 May 1973	10th-Anniversary Stadium, Warsaw, Poland	Yugoslavia	1–0	2–2	Friendly
42	16 May 1973	Olympic Stadium, Wrocław, Poland	Republic of Ireland	1–0	2–0	Friendly
43	16 May 1973	Olympic Stadium, Wrocław, Poland	Republic of Ireland	2–0	2–0	Friendly
44	6 June 1973	Silesian Stadium, Chorzów, Poland	England	2–0	2–0	1974 FIFA World Cup qualification
45	1 May 1977	Idrætsparken, Copenhagen, Denmark	Denmark	1–0	2–1	1978 FIFA World Cup qualification
46	1 May 1977	Idrætsparken, Copenhagen, Denmark	Denmark	2–1	2–1	1978 FIFA World Cup qualification
47	22 March 1978	Stade Josy Barthel, Luxembourg, Luxembourg	Luxembourg	3–1	3–1	Friendly
48	24 September 1980	Silesian Stadium, Chorzów, Poland	Czechoslovakia	1–1	1–1	Friendly

== Honours ==
Górnik Zabrze

- Ekstraklasa: 1962–63, 1963–64, 1964–65, 1965–66, 1966–67, 1970–71, 1971–72
- Polish Cup: 1964–65, 1967–68, 1968–69, 1969–70, 1970–71, 1971–72

Poland

- Summer Olympics: 1972

Individual

- Ekstraklasa top scorer: 1965–66, 1966–67, 1967–68, 1968–69
- European Cup Winners' Cup Top Scorer: 1969–70, 1970–71
- World XI: 1968, 1969, 1972, 1973
- Merited Master of Sport of the USSR: 1972
- Order of Polonia Restituta: 1997
- UEFA Poland's Golden Player: 2004
- Order of Merit of the Republic of Poland: 2015
- Polish Football Association National Team of the Century: 1919–2019

== See also ==
- Sport in Poland
- List of Polish footballers
