= 1971–72 Ekstraklasa =

46th season of top-tier football league in Poland

I liga
- Season: 1971–72
- Dates: 7 August 1971 – 28 June 1972
- Champions: Górnik Zabrze (10th title)
- Relegated: Stal Rzeszów; Szombierki Bytom
- European Cup: Górnik Zabrze
- Cup Winners' Cup: Legia Warsaw
- UEFA Cup: Zagłębie Sosnowiec; Ruch Chorzów
- Matches: 182
- Goals: 402 (2.21 per match)
- Top goalscorer: Ryszard Szymczak (16 goals)
- Biggest home win: Ruch 5–0 Pogoń; Stal Rz. 5–0 Szombierki
- Biggest away win: Wisła 1–5 Górnik; Polonia 0–4 Górnik
- Highest scoring: Odra 4–5 Ruch
- Highest attendance: 40,000
- Total attendance: 2,360,722
- Average attendance: 12,971 ▲18.9%

The 1971–72 I liga was the 46th season of the Polish Football Championship and the 38th season of the I liga, the top Polish professional league for association football clubs, since its establishment in 1927. The league was operated by the Polish Football Association (PZPN).

The defending champions were Górnik Zabrze, who won their 10th Polish title.

== Competition modus ==
The season started on 7 August 1971 and concluded on 28 June 1972 (autumn-spring league). The season was played as a round-robin tournament. The team at the top of the standings won the league title. A total of 14 teams participated, 12 of which competed in the league during the 1970–71 season, while the remaining two were promoted from the 1970–71 II liga. Each team played a total of 26 matches, half at home and half away, two games against each other team. Teams received two points for a win and one point for a draw.

== League table ==
Pos	Team	Pld	W	D	L	GF	GA	GD	Pts	Qualification or relegation
1	Górnik Zabrze (C)	26	14	9	3	45	23	+22	37	Qualification to European Cup first round
2	Zagłębie Sosnowiec	26	13	7	6	31	26	+5	33	Qualification to UEFA Cup first round
3	Legia Warsaw	26	12	8	6	36	20	+16	32	Qualification to Cup Winners' Cup first round
4	Ruch Chorzów	26	13	4	9	46	33	+13	30	Qualification to UEFA Cup first round
5	Stal Mielec	26	12	6	8	29	19	+10	30	
6	Gwardia Warsaw	26	11	6	9	28	21	+7	28	
7	Odra Opole	26	9	9	8	25	27	−2	27	
8	Zagłębie Wałbrzych	26	9	8	9	22	21	+1	26	
9	Wisła Kraków	26	7	11	8	29	34	−5	25	
10	Polonia Bytom	26	5	11	10	19	31	−12	21	
11	Pogoń Szczecin	26	8	4	14	24	37	−13	20	
12	ŁKS Łódź	26	3	13	10	24	39	−15	19	
13	Stal Rzeszów (R)	26	4	10	12	20	32	−12	18	Relegated to II liga
14	Szombierki Bytom (R)	26	6	6	14	24	39	−15	18	Relegated to II liga

Source: 90minut.pl (in Polish)
(C) Champions; (R) Relegated

== Results ==
Home \ Away	GÓR	GWA	LEG	ŁKS	OOP	POG	PBY	RUC	STM	STR	SBY	WIS	ZSO	ZWA
Górnik Zabrze		3–2	1–2	1–0	1–1	1–0	2–2	1–1	2–2	1–0	2–1	3–2	3–0	1–0
Gwardia Warszawa	1–1		0–1	2–0	1–1	0–1	3–0	0–2	1–1	0–0	2–0	3–0	3–1	1–0
Legia Warsaw	1–1	2–0		3–1	0–1	4–0	2–0	2–0	2–0	3–0	0–0	1–1	1–0	0–3
ŁKS Łódź	1–3	1–0	0–2		0–0	2–1	0–0	2–2	1–1	1–1	1–1	3–0	1–1	1–3
Odra Opole	1–0	0–0	1–1	3–2		1–0	1–0	4–5	1–0	3–0	0–2	1–4	1–0	0–0
Pogoń Szczecin	0–1	1–2	0–2	1–1	2–0		2–1	1–0	1–0	4–3	1–0	1–2	1–2	2–0
Polonia Bytom	0–4	0–2	1–1	3–2	0–0	1–1		3–1	0–1	0–0	2–0	1–1	0–1	0–0
Ruch Chorzów	1–4	0–1	2–1	4–1	1–1	5–0	1–2		3–0	2–1	3–1	3–1	1–0	0–1
Stal Mielec	0–0	2–1	2–1	4–0	1–0	3–1	0–0	0–1		3–0	1–0	1–0	0–1	3–1
Stal Rzeszów	1–1	0–1	0–0	0–0	1–1	1–0	1–0	0–1	0–2		5–0	1–1	2–1	0–1
Szombierki Bytom	1–2	3–0	1–1	1–1	0–3	1–1	0–1	1–0	0–2	2–2		3–1	1–3	3–0
Wisła Kraków	1–5	0–2	1–1	1–1	1–0	2–1	3–0	1–1	0–0	1–0	3–0		0–0	1–1
Zagłębie Sosnowiec	1–0	1–0	3–2	1–1	1–0	1–1	2–2	4–3	1–0	0–0	2–1	1–1		1–0
Zagłębie Wałbrzych	1–1	0–0	1–0	0–0	4–0	1–0	0–0	0–3	1–0	3–1	0–1	0–0	1–2	

Source: 90minut.pl (in Polish)
Legend: Blue = home team win; Yellow = draw; Red = away team win.

== Top goalscorers ==
Rank	Player	Club	Goals
1	(Poland) Ryszard Szymczak	Gwardia Warsaw	16
2	(Poland) Wlodzimierz Lubanski	Górnik Zabrze	14
3	(Poland) Joachim Marx	Ruch Chorzów	13
4	(Poland) Kazimierz Kmiecik	Wisła Kraków	11
4	(Poland) Grzegorz Lato	Stal Mielec	11
6	(Poland) Kazimierz Deyna	Legia Warsaw	10
7	(Poland) Józef Gałeczka	Zagłębie Sosnowiec	9
7	(Poland) Jan Banaś	Górnik Zabrze	9
9	(Poland) Jerzy Sadek	ŁKS Łódź	8
9	(Poland) Edward Herman	Ruch Chorzów	8
9	(Poland) Ernest Powieczko	Odra Opole	8
9	(Poland) Jerzy Odsterczyl	Zagłębie Wałbrzych	8

== Attendances ==
#	Club	Average
1	ŁKS	27,538
2	Górnik Zabrze	18,615
3	Ruch Chorzów	17,077
4	Wisła Kraków	15,769
5	Pogoń Szczecin	13,615
6	Stal Mielec	13,462
7	Stal Rzeszów	13,077
8	Legia Warszawa	13,077
9	Zagłębie Sosnowiec	12,000
10	Odra Opole	10,462
11	Zagłębie Wałbrzych	8,923
12	Polonia Bytom	8,769
13	Gwardia Warszawa	5,062
14	Szombierki Bytom	4,154

== Bibliography ==
- Gowarzewski, Andrzej (2000). Encyklopedia Piłkarska Fuji. Liga Polska. O tytuł mistrza Polski 1920–2000 (in Polish). GiA, Katowice. ISBN 83-88232-02-9.
