= 1965–66 Ekstraklasa =

40th season of top-tier football league in Poland

Liga
- Season: 1965–66
- Champions: Górnik Zabrze (7th title)
- Relegated: Odra Opole; Gwardia Warsaw
- Top goalscorer: Włodzimierz Lubański (23 goals)

Statistics of Ekstraklasa for the 1965–66 season.

== Overview ==
14 teams competed in the 1965-66 season with Górnik Zabrze winning the championship.

== League table ==
Pos	Team	Pld	W	D	L	GF	GA	GD	Pts	Qualification or relegation
1	Górnik Zabrze (C)	26	19	4	3	62	24	+38	42	Qualification to European Cup first round
2	Wisła Kraków	26	10	12	4	29	22	+7	32	
3	Polonia Bytom	26	12	7	7	37	28	+9	31	
4	Szombierki Bytom	26	13	5	8	43	35	+8	31	
5	Zagłębie Sosnowiec	26	12	5	9	59	39	+20	29	
6	Legia Warsaw	26	9	8	9	30	28	+2	26	Qualification to Cup Winners' Cup first round
7	Stal Rzeszów	26	8	10	8	29	30	−1	26	
8	Śląsk Wrocław	26	9	7	10	26	35	−9	25	
9	Zawisza Bydgoszcz	26	10	4	12	30	35	−5	24	
10	GKS Katowice	26	7	8	11	24	37	−13	22	
11	Ruch Chorzów	26	8	5	13	41	44	−3	21	
12	ŁKS Łódź	26	7	7	12	33	41	−8	21	
13	Odra Opole (R)	26	7	6	13	26	40	−14	20	Relegated to II liga
14	Gwardia Warsaw (R)	26	5	4	17	20	51	−31	14	Relegated to II liga

Source: 90minut.pl (in Polish)
(C) Champions; (R) Relegated

== Results ==
Home \ Away	KAT	GÓR	GWA	LEG	ŁKS	OOP	BYT	RUC	SRZ	SZB	ŚLĄ	WIS	ZSO	ZAW
GKS Katowice		2–3	4–2	2–0	1–0	0–0	0–3	2–1	2–2	0–1	0–0	0–0	1–0	1–0
Górnik Zabrze	3–0		4–0	1–1	2–1	4–0	0–2	3–1	3–0	4–3	3–0	3–0	6–2	2–1
Gwardia Warsaw	1–1	0–2		3–2	0–1	0–1	1–2	1–0	3–2	3–2	1–0	1–2	0–4	0–0
Legia Warsaw	2–0	0–2	3–1		3–1	2–1	0–0	5–1	1–0	1–0	0–0	0–0	1–3	2–0
ŁKS Łódź	1–2	0–3	4–1	0–0		4–0	1–2	1–0	2–1	0–0	3–0	1–1	3–3	4–0
Odra Opole	3–0	0–2	0–0	1–1	2–1		1–0	0–1	0–1	2–1	1–0	1–1	1–4	1–2
Polonia Bytom	0–0	1–3	4–1	2–0	3–1	2–1		2–1	1–1	1–2	1–1	2–2	3–2	0–2
Ruch Chorzów	2–2	5–1	4–0	2–0	1–1	2–3	1–0		1–2	2–3	3–0	0–1	1–2	2–1
Stal Rzeszów	1–0	0–0	0–0	2–1	3–0	3–1	0–1	0–0		2–2	3–2	0–0	1–1	1–0
Szombierki Bytom	2–1	0–3	3–1	2–1	0–0	3–3	1–1	4–1	3–0		1–0	2–0	2–1	2–0
Śląsk Wrocław	3–2	3–1	2–0	1–0	1–1	1–0	0–0	2–2	3–2	3–0		1–1	0–3	2–0
Wisła Kraków	1–1	1–1	1–0	0–0	3–1	1–0	2–0	2–2	1–0	2–1	0–1		1–1	4–1
Zagłębie Sosnowiec	1–0	0–2	2–0	1–2	6–0	3–3	3–2	5–3	1–1	1–2	5–0	1–2		3–0
Zawisza Bydgoszcz	5–0	1–1	1–0	2–2	3–1	1–0	1–2	1–2	1–1	2–1	2–0	1–0	2–1	

Source: 90minut.pl (in Polish)
Legend: Blue = home team win; Yellow = draw; Red = away team win.

== Top goalscorers ==
Rank	Player	Club	Goals
1	(Poland) Włodzimierz Lubański	Górnik Zabrze	23
2	(Poland) Ginter Piecyk	Zagłębie Sosnowiec	15
2	(Poland) Ernest Pol	Górnik Zabrze	15
4	(Poland) Norbert Pogrzeba	Polonia Bytom	14
4	(Poland) Jerzy Wilim	Szombierki Bytom	14
6	(Poland) Józef Gałeczka	Zagłębie Sosnowiec	13
7	(Poland) Eugeniusz Faber	Ruch Chorzów	12
7	(Poland) Władysław Gzel	Zagłębie Sosnowiec	12
9	(Poland) Edward Herman	Ruch Chorzów	11
9	(Poland) Eugeniusz Lerch	Ruch Chorzów	11

== Attendances ==
#	Club	Average
1	Śląsk Wrocław	24,154
2	Ruch Chorzów	22,538
3	Górnik Zabrze	21,231
4	ŁKS	18,462
5	Zagłębie Sosnowiec	17,692
6	Katowice	14,000
7	Wisła Kraków	13,538
8	Stal Rzeszów	11,692
9	Polonia Bytom	10,885
10	Zawisza Bydgoszcz	8,692
11	Legia Warszawa	8,615
12	Szombierki Bytom	8,538
13	Odra Opole	7,385
14	Gwardia Warszawa	6,577
