= 1966–67 Ekstraklasa =

41st season of top-tier football league in Poland

Liga
- Season: 1966–67
- Champions: Górnik Zabrze (8th title)
- Relegated: Zawisza Bydgoszcz; KS Cracovia
- European Cup: Górnik Zabrze
- Top goalscorer: Włodzimierz Lubański (18 goals)

Statistics of Ekstraklasa for the 1966–67 season.

== Overview ==
It was contested by 14 teams, and Górnik Zabrze won the championship.

== League table ==
Pos	Team	Pld	W	D	L	GF	GA	GD	Pts	Qualification or relegation
1	Górnik Zabrze (C)	26	16	5	5	44	20	+24	37	Qualification to European Cup first round
2	Zagłębie Sosnowiec	26	14	6	6	45	25	+20	34	
3	Ruch Chorzów	26	13	4	9	44	30	+14	30	
4	Legia Warsaw	26	9	10	7	35	22	+13	28	
5	ŁKS Łódź	26	10	8	8	29	28	+1	28	
6	Polonia Bytom	26	11	5	10	35	34	+1	27	
7	GKS Katowice	26	11	5	10	29	32	−3	27	
8	Stal Rzeszów	26	9	8	9	24	30	−6	26	
9	Pogoń Szczecin	26	10	4	12	30	39	−9	24	
10	Wisła Kraków	26	8	7	11	30	36	−6	23	Qualification to Cup Winners' Cup first round
11	Szombierki Bytom	26	10	3	13	29	37	−8	23	
12	Śląsk Wrocław	26	8	5	13	23	28	−5	21	
13	Zawisza Bydgoszcz (R)	26	6	7	13	20	35	−15	19	Relegated to II liga
14	KS Cracovia (R)	26	7	3	16	27	48	−21	17	Relegated to II liga

Source: 90minut.pl (in Polish)
(C) Champions; (R) Relegated

== Results ==
Home \ Away	CRA	KAT	GÓR	LEG	ŁKS	POG	BYT	RUC	SRZ	SZB	ŚLĄ	WIS	ZSO	ZAW
Cracovia		1–2	2–5	2–0	0–1	5–0	1–3	1–0	0–0	2–1	1–0	1–2	1–1	0–2
GKS Katowice	1–0		0–3	0–4	3–1	1–1	2–3	0–1	3–1	4–0	0–0	0–0	0–0	1–0
Górnik Zabrze	1–0	3–0		1–4	1–0	3–1	1–1	4–1	2–3	3–1	1–0	2–1	2–0	2–0
Legia Warsaw	4–0	0–3	1–0		1–1	0–0	1–1	0–0	1–2	1–1	1–1	5–0	0–2	5–1
ŁKS Łódź	1–1	1–1	0–0	1–0		2–1	0–0	2–2	1–1	1–2	2–0	1–0	2–0	0–0
Pogoń Szczecin	4–2	0–1	1–0	2–0	0–2		3–1	1–0	0–1	2–2	3–1	1–2	1–2	1–0
Polonia Bytom	6–2	3–0	0–0	1–0	2–1	0–1		0–2	1–1	3–1	2–1	1–0	1–3	2–1
Ruch Chorzów	3–0	3–1	1–3	1–1	5–2	2–0	1–2		3–0	1–0	2–0	4–1	1–2	2–0
Stal Rzeszów	1–2	1–2	0–3	1–1	2–0	1–0	1–0	2–0		1–0	0–0	1–1	1–1	2–0
Szombierki Bytom	0–2	1–0	1–0	0–1	1–2	1–2	1–0	3–2	1–0		2–1	4–2	1–0	3–0
Śląsk Wrocław	1–0	1–2	0–1	1–3	1–2	4–1	2–1	2–1	2–0	1–0		1–0	3–0	0–1
Wisła Kraków	3–0	1–0	0–0	0–1	2–0	1–1	3–1	0–2	4–0	3–1	0–0		0–4	2–2
Zagłębie Sosnowiec	4–1	3–1	2–2	0–0	1–0	5–1	3–0	1–2	0–0	3–1	2–0	2–1		4–0
Zawisza Bydgoszcz	2–0	0–1	0–1	0–0	1–3	0–2	2–0	2–2	2–1	0–0	0–0	1–1	3–0	

Source: 90minut.pl (in Polish)
Legend: Blue = home team win; Yellow = draw; Red = away team win.

== Top goalscorers ==
Rank	Player	Club	Goals
1	(Poland) Włodzimierz Lubański	Górnik Zabrze	18
2	(Poland) Andrzej Jarosik	Zagłębie Sosnowiec	15
2	(Poland) Jerzy Wilim	Szombierki Bytom	15
4	(Poland) Ginter Piecyk	Zagłębie Sosnowiec	12
4	(Poland) Jerzy Sadek	ŁKS Łódź	12
6	(Poland) Eugeniusz Faber	Ruch Chorzów	11
6	(Poland) Edward Herman	Ruch Chorzów	11
8	(Poland) Jan Domarski	Stal Rzeszów	10
9	(Poland) Józef Gomoluch	Ruch Chorzów	9
9	(Poland) Krzysztof Hausner	KS Cracovia	9
9	(Poland) Andrzej Kaczewski	Śląsk Wrocław	9
9	(Poland) Marian Kielec	Pogoń Szczecin	9
9	(Poland) Gerard Rother	GKS Katowice	9

== Attendances ==
No.	Club	Average
1	ŁKS	20,000
2	Śląsk Wrocław	16,077
3	Cracovia	15,692
4	Pogoń Szczecin	15,538
5	Zagłębie Sosnowiec	15,385
6	Ruch Chorzów	14,923
7	Wisła Kraków	12,846
8	Górnik Zabrze	11,846
9	Zawisza Bydgoszcz	9,846
10	Stal Rzeszów	9,462
11	Polonia Bytom	8,615
12	Legia Warszawa	7,538
13	Szombierki Bytom	6,615
14	Katowice	6,577
