= 1970–71 Ekstraklasa =

45th season of top-tier football league in Poland

I liga
- Season: 1970–71
- Dates: 8 August 1970 – 23 June 1971
- Champions: Górnik Zabrze (9th title)
- Relegated: ROW Rybnik; GKS Katowice
- European Cup: Górnik Zabrze
- Cup Winners' Cup: Zagłębie Sosnowiec
- UEFA Cup: Legia Warsaw; Zagłębie Wałbrzych
- Matches: 182
- Goals: 395 (2.17 per match)
- Top goalscorer: Andrzej Jarosik (13 goals)
- Biggest home win: Ruch 6–0 Pogoń; Stal Rz. 6–0 Wisła
- Biggest away win: Pogoń 0–4 Legia
- Highest scoring: Górnik 4–3 Szombierki; Stal M. 5–2 Wisła
- Highest attendance: 60,000
- Total attendance: 1,984,710
- Average attendance: 10,905 ▲7.0%

The 1970–71 I liga was the 45th season of the Polish Football Championship and the 37th season of the I liga, the top Polish professional league for association football clubs, since its establishment in 1927. The league was operated by the Polish Football Association (PZPN).

The champions were Górnik Zabrze, who won their 9th Polish title.

== Competition modus ==
The season started on 8 August 1970 and concluded on 23 June 1971 (autumn-spring league). The season was played as a round-robin tournament. The team at the top of the standings won the league title. A total of 14 teams participated, 12 of which competed in the league during the 1969–70 season, while the remaining two were promoted from the 1969–70 II liga. Each team played a total of 26 matches, half at home and half away, two games against each other team. Teams received two points for a win and one point for a draw.

== League table ==
Pos	Team	Pld	W	D	L	GF	GA	GD	Pts	Qualification or relegation
1	Górnik Zabrze (C)	26	17	5	4	43	21	+22	39	Qualification to European Cup first round
2	Legia Warsaw	26	14	6	6	39	20	+19	34	Qualification to UEFA Cup first round
3	Zagłębie Wałbrzych	26	10	7	9	24	24	0	27	Qualification to UEFA Cup first round
4	Pogoń Szczecin	26	9	9	8	23	32	−9	27	
5	Ruch Chorzów	26	8	9	9	43	32	+11	25	
6	Szombierki Bytom	26	9	7	10	30	32	−2	25	
7	Zagłębie Sosnowiec	26	8	9	9	32	37	−5	25	Qualification to Cup Winners' Cup first round
8	Wisła Kraków	26	8	9	9	26	36	−10	25	
9	Stal Rzeszów	26	6	12	8	34	26	+8	24	
10	Stal Mielec	26	8	8	10	27	33	−6	24	
11	Gwardia Warsaw	26	8	7	11	24	28	−4	23	
12	Polonia Bytom	26	5	13	8	15	22	−7	23	
13	ROW Rybnik (R)	26	7	8	11	15	22	−7	22	Relegated to II liga
14	GKS Katowice (R)	26	4	13	9	20	30	−10	21	Relegated to II liga

Source: 90minut.pl (in Polish)
(C) Champions; (R) Relegated

== Results ==
Home \ Away	KAT	GÓR	GWA	LEG	POG	BYT	RYB	RUC	STA	SRZ	SZB	WIS	ZSO	ZWA
GKS Katowice		1–1	0–0	1–0	3–0	0–0	0–1	0–0	1–1	0–0	0–0	1–3	1–1	0–0
Górnik Zabrze	2–0		1–0	3–1	0–0	2–0	1–0	1–0	1–0	2–1	4–3	2–2	5–0	1–0
Gwardia Warsaw	0–0	0–1		1–0	0–2	2–0	3–0	0–3	3–1	1–1	1–0	1–0	4–2	0–1
Legia Warsaw	3–2	0–2	1–0		0–0	0–0	3–0	3–1	1–0	1–0	2–0	3–1	3–3	3–0
Pogoń Szczecin	3–2	1–1	1–0	0–4		0–2	1–0	1–0	1–1	1–1	5–1	1–0	1–1	2–1
Polonia Bytom	0–2	2–4	1–1	0–0	0–0		1–1	0–3	1–2	0–0	1–1	0–0	1–0	1–0
ROW Rybnik	0–1	1–0	0–1	0–0	0–1	0–0		1–1	2–1	1–0	1–0	4–0	0–0	2–0
Ruch Chorzów	2–2	3–2	4–2	2–4	6–0	0–1	1–1		1–2	2–2	0–1	1–1	4–1	4–0
Stal Mielec	1–1	2–3	0–0	0–0	0–0	1–0	0–0	1–2		1–0	0–0	5–2	2–0	1–4
Stal Rzeszów	4–1	0–1	2–2	1–3	2–0	1–1	0–0	1–1	3–0		3–2	6–0	1–2	1–1
Szombierki Bytom	4–0	0–2	1–1	1–2	3–1	0–2	1–0	1–0	3–0	1–0		2–2	3–3	1–0
Wisła Kraków	1–0	1–0	1–0	1–0	2–0	0–0	2–0	2–2	1–2	1–1	0–0		0–3	2–0
Zagłębie Sosnowiec	1–1	2–0	2–0	0–2	1–1	2–1	3–0	0–0	1–2	1–3	0–1	1–0		2–1
Zagłębie Wałbrzych	2–0	1–1	3–1	1–0	1–0	0–0	1–0	2–0	2–1	0–0	2–0	1–1	0–0	

Source: 90minut.pl (in Polish)
Legend: Blue = home team win; Yellow = draw; Red = away team win.

== Top goalscorers ==
Rank	Player	Club	Goals
1	(Poland) Andrzej Jarosik	Zagłębie Sosnowiec	13
2	(Poland) Grzegorz Lato	Stal Mielec	11
2	(Poland) Edward Herman	Ruch Chorzów	11
4	(Poland) Włodzimierz Lubański	Górnik Zabrze	10
5	(Poland) Robert Gadocha	Legia Warsaw	9
5	(Poland) Joachim Marx	Ruch Chorzów	9
5	(Poland) Ryszard Duda	Stal Rzeszów	9
5	(Poland) Jan Małkiewicz	Legia Warsaw	9
9	(Poland) Bronisław Bula	Ruch Chorzów	8
9	(Poland) Waldemar Tandecki	Stal Rzeszów	8
9	(Poland) Roman Jakóbczak	Pogoń Szczecin	8

== Attendances ==
#	Club	Average
1	Ruch Chorzów	15,231
2	Stal Mielec	15,000
3	Stal Rzeszów	14,615
4	Górnik Zabrze	13,462
5	Pogoń Szczecin	13,154
6	Wisła Kraków	13,077
7	Legia Warszawa	12,385
8	ROW	11,846
9	Polonia Bytom	11,385
10	Zagłębie Wałbrzych	11,231
11	Zagłębie Sosnowiec	9,000
12	Gwardia Warszawa	5,708
13	Szombierki Bytom	4,115
14	Katowice	2,462

== Bibliography ==
- Gowarzewski, Andrzej (2000). Encyklopedia Piłkarska Fuji. Liga Polska. O tytuł mistrza Polski 1920–2000 (in Polish). GiA, Katowice. ISBN 83-88232-02-9.
