= List of Poland international footballers =

List of Polish footballers

This is a list of Poland international footballers – footballers who earned caps for Poland national football team.

The record for most caps is held by Robert Lewandowski, with 172. Other players to have reached the milestone of 100 appearances for the Poland senior team are Jakub Błaszczykowski, Kamil Glik, Kamil Grosicki, Grzegorz Krychowiak, Grzegorz Lato, Piotr Zieliński and Michał Żewłakow.

== Players ==
Appearances and goals are composed of FIFA World Cup and UEFA European Championship matches and each competition's required qualification matches, as well as UEFA Nations League matches, and numerous international friendly tournaments and matches. Players are listed alphabetically. Statistics correct as of 17 November 2026.

Key
GK	Goalkeeper
DF	Defender
MF	Midfielder
FW	Forward
Bold	Still playing competitive football

Name	Pos.	Caps	Goals	First cap	Last cap
**Sławomir Abramowicz**	GK	1	0	2026	—
Dariusz Adamczuk	MF	11	1	1992	1999
Krzysztof Adamczyk	FW	3	0	1980	1981
Waldemar Adamczyk	FW	2	0	1997	1997
Józef Adamek	FW	9	2	1924	1930
Józef Adamiec	DF	9	1	1981	1984
Marcin Adamski	DF	3	0	2003	2005
Spirydion Albański	GK	18	0	1931	1936
Henryk Alszer	FW	13	2	1948	1955
**Michael Ameyaw**	MF	2	0	2024	2024
Antoni Amirowicz	FW	1	0	1924	1924
Zygmunt Anczok	DF	48	0	1965	1973
Stanisław Andrzejewski	GK	1	0	1936	1936
Teodor Anioła	MF	7	2	1950	1954
Henryk Apostel	MF	1	0	1962	1962
Jarosław Araszkiewicz	MF	12	0	1985	1992
**Rafał Augustyniak**	DF	1	0	2021	2021
Jan Badura	MF	2	0	1931	1936
Jarosław Bako	GK	35	0	1988	1993
Mieczysław Balcer	FW	10	8	1924	1934
Jan Banaś	FW	31	7	1964	1973
Henryk Bałuszyński	FW	15	4	1994	1997
Tomasz Bandrowski	MF	7	0	2008	2010
Hubert Banisz	DF	6	0	1952	1953
Janusz Baran	FW	1	0	1979	1979
Krzysztof Baran	FW	10	4	1981	1987
Stanisław Baran	FW	9	0	1939	1950
Maksymilian Barański	FW	5	0	1947	1947
Hieronim Barczak	DF	8	0	1980	1980
**Grzegorz Bartczak**	DF	2	0	2007	2007
Henryk Bartyla	DF	7	0	1952	1955
Antoni Barwiński	DF	17	0	1947	1950
Marcin Baszczyński	DF	35	1	2000	2006
Krzysztof Baszkiewicz	FW	20	4	1955	1960
Gustaw Bator	FW	3	1	1931	1932
Mieczysław Batsch	FW	11	8	1923	1926
Jacek Bayer	FW	1	0	1987	1987
Roman Bazan	DF	21	2	1963	1968
Arkadiusz Bąk	MF	13	0	1998	2002
Jacek Bąk	DF	96	3	1993	2008
Mirosław Bąk	FW	1	0	1983	1983
**Jan Bednarek**	DF	80	2	2017	—
Jacek Bednarz	DF	5	0	1993	1996
Witold Bendkowski	DF	5	0	1988	1988
**Adrian Benedyczak**	FW	2	1	2026	—
Jan Benigier	FW	4	0	1976	1976
Jacek Berensztajn	MF	2	0	1996	1997
**Bartosz Bereszyński**	DF	59	0	2013	—
Edmund Białas	FW	2	0	1948	1948
Jan Białas	MF	1	0	1974	1974
Bartosz Białkowski	GK	1	0	2018	2018
Marek Biegun	DF	1	0	1985	1985
**Krystian Bielik**	MF	11	0	2019	2023
Zdzisław Bieniek	MF	7	0	1952	1954
Jarosław Bieniuk	DF	8	1	2003	2009
Edward Bill	DF	1	0	1927	1927
Krzysztof Bizacki	FW	2	0	2000	2000
Bernard Blaut	MF	36	3	1960	1971
Zygfryd Blaut	DF	1	0	1970	1970
Andrzej Bledzewski	GK	1	0	2002	2002
Tadeusz Błachno	MF	2	0	1978	1978
Jakub Błaszczykowski	MF	109	21	2006	2023
Jacek Bobrowicz	GK	1	0	1991	1991
Henryk Bobula	FW	5	0	1948	1948
**Paweł Bochniewicz**	DF	3	0	2020	2023
Sebastian Boenisch	DF	14	0	2010	2013
**Rafał Boguski**	FW	6	3	2007	2009
Daniel Bogusz	DF	2	0	1997	2002
**Mateusz Bogusz**	MF	5	0	2024	—
Czesław Boguszewicz	DF	5	0	1976	1977
Modest Boguszewski	DF	2	0	1987	1987
Henryk Bolesta	GK	1	0	1986	1986
Zbigniew Boniek	MF	80	24	1976	1988
Grzegorz Bonin	MF	1	0	2006	2006
Artur Boruc	GK	65	0	2004	2017
Henryk Borucz	GK	5	0	1949	1951
**Ariel Borysiuk**	MF	12	0	2010	2016
Bartosz Bosacki	DF	20	2	2002	2009
Antoni Böttcher	DF	1	0	1937	1937
Henryk Bożek	FW	2	0	1950	1950
Oskar Brajter	FW	4	0	1950	1952
Henryk Brejza	DF	9	0	1966	1968
Piotr Brol	GK	2	0	1967	1969
Walter Brom	GK	2	0	1947	1947
**Grzegorz Bronowicki**	DF	14	0	2006	2008
**Łukasz Broź**	DF	3	0	2012	2014
Paweł Brożek	FW	38	9	2005	2014
**Piotr Brożek**	DF	5	1	2008	2010
Lucjan Brychczy	FW	58	18	1954	1969
Jerzy Brzęczek	MF	42	4	1992	1999
Piotr Brzoza	DF	1	0	1988	1988
Edward Brzozowski	DF	6	0	1947	1951
**Tomasz Brzyski**	DF	7	1	2010	2014
Kazimierz Buda	DF	10	2	1981	1984
**Adrian Budka**	MF	1	0	2006	2006
Krzysztof Budka	DF	3	0	1989	1989
Ryszard Budka	DF	2	0	1962	1962
Krzysztof Bukalski	MF	17	2	1995	1998
**Adam Buksa**	FW	25	7	2021	—
Bronisław Bula	MF	26	5	1968	1975
Mirosław Bulzacki	DF	23	0	1973	1975
Jerzy Bułanow	DF	22	0	1922	1935
**Marcin Bułka**	GK	10	0	2023	—
Andrzej Buncol	MF	51	6	1980	1986
**Marcin Burkhardt**	MF	10	1	2003	2005
Stanisław Burzyński	GK	2	0	1976	1976
**Matty Cash**	DF	30	4	2021	—
Eugeniusz Cebrat	GK	6	0	1985	1985
Edward Cebula	FW	5	0	1939	1952
Tomasz Cebula	FW	12	0	1990	1994
Franciszek Cebulak	MF	5	0	1931	1936
Piotr Celeban	DF	10	0	2008	2013
Mateusz Cetnarski	MF	2	0	2010	2010
Jacek Chańko	DF	1	0	1999	1999
Marek Chojnacki	DF	4	0	1981	1981
Romuald Chojnacki	FW	2	0	1974	1974
Zygmunt Chruściński	MF	9	1	1924	1932
Bolesław Cichecki	MF	1	0	1926	1926
Helmut Cichoń	MF	4	0	1954	1955
Radosław Cierzniak	GK	1	0	2009	2009
Tomasz Ciesielski	DF	1	0	2002	2002
Gerard Cieślik	FW	45	27	1947	1958
Stanisław Cikowski	MF	9	0	1921	1924
Włodzimierz Ciołek	MF	29	4	1978	1985
**Thiago Cionek**	DF	21	0	2014	2018
Wiesław Cisek	MF	12	2	1987	1988
Józef Ciszewski	FW	14	3	1925	1934
Marek Citko	MF	10	2	1996	1997
Czesław Ciupa	FW	3	0	1956	1957
Paweł Cyganek	FW	1	0	1939	1939
Wawrzyniec Cyl	DF/FW	3	0	1923	1924
Ryszard Cyroń	FW	2	0	1988	1988
Marian Czachor	DF	1	0	1947	1947
Piotr Czachowski	DF	45	1	1989	1993
Piotr Czaja	GK	2	0	1970	1970
Mieczysław Czajkowski	DF	2	0	1925	1925
Henryk Czech	FW	1	0	1956	1956
Sylwester Czereszewski	FW	23	4	1994	1999
Ryszard Czerwiec	MF	28	0	1991	2000
**Alan Czerwiński**	DF	1	0	2020	2020
**Karol Czubak**	FW	1	0	2026	—
Stanisław Czulak	FW	1	1	1924	1924
Lesław Ćmikiewicz	MF	57	0	1970	1979
**Piotr Ćwielong**	FW	1	0	2013	2013
**Adam Danch**	DF	2	0	2008	2012
Piotr Danielak	MF	1	0	1938	1938
Józef Dankowski	DF	3	0	1985	1987
**Paweł Dawidowicz**	DF	17	0	2015	2024
Tomasz Dawidowski	FW	10	1	2001	2003
**Damian Dąbrowski**	MF	1	0	2016	2016
Roman Dąbrowski	FW	5	0	1994	2003
Jacek Dembiński	FW	10	0	1994	1998
Stanisław Deutschmann	MF	1	0	1928	1928
Kazimierz Deyna	MF	97	41	1968	1978
Tadeusz Dolny	DF	7	0	1981	1985
Stefan Domański	GK	6	0	1924	1934
Jan Domarski	FW	17	2	1967	1974
Stefan Doniec	DF	3	0	1935	1935
Jan Drapała	GK	1	0	1926	1926
**Bartłomiej Drągowski**	GK	5	0	2020	—
Andrzej Drozdowski	MF	7	0	1973	1974
Paweł Drumlak	MF	1	0	2002	2002
Piotr Drzewiecki	DF	3	0	1974	1974
Jacek Duchowski	DF	1	0	1990	1990
Jerzy Dudek	GK	60	0	1998	2013
Dariusz Dudka	MF	65	2	2004	2012
Jan Durka	FW	1	0	1926	1926
Roman Durniok	DF	4	0	1953	1954
Leopold Duźniak	FW	1	1	1922	1922
Jerzy Dworczyk	FW	1	0	1978	1978
Ignacy Dybała	FW	1	0	1950	1950
Ewald Dytko	MF	22	0	1935	1939
**Patryk Dziczek**	MF	2	0	2023	2023
Dariusz Dziekanowski	FW	63	20	1981	1990
Marek Dziuba	DF	53	1	1977	1984
Tomasz Dziubiński	FW	2	0	1991	1993
Karol Dziwisz	MF	2	0	1933	1934
Marian Einbacher	FW	1	0	1921	1921
Jan Erlich	MF	2	0	1977	1977
Eugeniusz Faber	FW	36	11	1959	1969
Roman Faber	MF	2	1	1979	1979
Łukasz Fabiański	GK	57	0	2006	2021
Adam Fedoruk	MF	18	1	1990	1994
Bronisław Fichtel	DF	2	0	1925	1926
Michał Filek	DF/MF	1	0	1947	1947
Andrzej Fischer	GK	2	0	1974	1974
Stanisław Flanek	DF	8	0	1947	1950
Stefan Fliegel	DF	1	0	1935	1935
Michał Flieger	DF	1	0	1926	1926
Stefan Florenski	DF	11	0	1957	1968
Waldemar Folbrycht	DF	1	0	1968	1968
Stanisław Fołtyn	GK	4	0	1960	1964
Marian Fontowicz	GK	8	0	1930	1935
Dariusz Fornalak	DF	2	0	1989	1989
Krzysztof Frankowski	MF	4	0	1981	1981
**Przemysław Frankowski**	MF	55	3	2018	—
Tomasz Frankowski	FW	22	10	1999	2006
Stefan Fryc	DF	8	0	1922	1924
Henryk Frymarkiewicz	GK	1	0	1934	1934
Dominik Furman	MF	2	0	2012	2013
Jan Furtok	FW	36	10	1984	1993
Hubert Gad	FW	6	2	1936	1937
Zygmunt Gadecki	FW	5	1	1960	1960
Robert Gadocha	FW	62	16	1967	1975
Norbert Gajda	FW	7	2	1961	1962
Henryk Gajdzik	MF	10	0	1947	1948
Antoni Gałecki	DF	18	0	1928	1938
Józef Gałeczka	FW	18	5	1962	1966
**Janusz Gancarczyk**	MF	1	0	2009	2009
Seweryn Gancarczyk	DF	7	0	2006	2009
Józef Garbień	FW	8	2	1922	1926
**Łukasz Garguła**	MF	16	1	2006	2009
Zygmunt Garłowski	MF	3	0	1974	1976
Ginter Gawlik	DF/MF	7	1	1957	1958
Jan Gawroński	FW	3	1	1957	1959
Czesław Gendera	FW	1	0	1938	1938
Roman Geszlecht	DF	4	0	1981	1981
Vahan Gevorgyan	MF	1	0	2004	2004
Michał Gębura	DF	3	0	1991	1991
Władysław Gędłek	DF	19	0	1949	1953
Dariusz Gęsior	DF/MF	22	1	1992	1999
Franciszek Giebartowski	DF	3	0	1926	1926
Edmund Giemsa	DF/FW	9	0	1933	1939
Witold Gieras	DF	3	0	1923	1925
Jarosław Gierejkiewicz	MF	1	0	1992	1992
Władysław Giergiel	FW	1	0	1947	1947
Radosław Gilewicz	FW	10	0	1997	2001
Ludwik Gintel	DF	12	0	1921	1925
Piotr Giza	MF	5	0	2005	2006
**Kamil Glik**	DF	103	6	2010	2022
Tadeusz Glimas	DF	4	0	1950	1952
**Michał Gliwa**	GK	1	0	2011	2011
Arkadiusz Głowacki	DF	29	0	2002	2011
Jacek Gmoch	MF	29	0	1962	1968
Arkadiusz Gmur	DF	1	0	1992	1992
Marek Godlewski	DF	3	0	1989	1990
Janusz Gol	MF	8	0	2010	2012
Paweł Golański	DF	14	1	2006	2009
Michał Goliński	MF	5	1	2004	2008
**Wojciech Golla**	DF	1	0	2014	2014
Konrad Gołoś	MF	3	0	2005	2008
Jan Gomola	GK	7	0	1966	1971
Józef Gomoluch	MF	1	0	1967	1967
Damian Gorawski	MF	14	1	2003	2005
Jerzy Gorgoń	DF	55	6	1970	1978
Emil Görlitz	GK	8	0	1924	1925
Janusz Góra	DF	11	0	1989	1992
Jarosław Góra	MF	1	0	1992	1992
Wilhelm Góra	MF	16	0	1935	1939
Jacek Góralski	MF	21	1	2016	2022
Kazimierz Górski	FW	1	0	1948	1948
**Kamil Grabara**	GK	6	0	2022	—
Mieczysław Gracz	FW	22	4	1947	1950
Jacek Grembocki	DF	7	0	1987	1994
Henryk Gronowski	GK	1	0	1957	1957
Robert Gronowski	FW	1	0	1953	1953
**Kamil Grosicki**	MF	101	17	2008	2026
Władysław Grotyński	GK	4	0	1970	1971
Ryszard Grzegorczyk	MF	23	2	1960	1966
Bartłomiej Grzelak	FW	4	2	2006	2007
Rafał Grzelak	MF	2	0	2006	2007
Dariusz Grzesik	MF	3	0	1990	1993
Henryk Grzybowski	DF	10	0	1957	1960
Robert Grzywocz	MF	2	0	1954	1954
Roger Guerreiro	MF	25	4	2008	2011
**Robert Gumny**	DF	6	0	2020	2023
Zbigniew Gut	DF	11	0	1972	1974
Władysław Gzel	FW	2	0	1962	1964
Stanisław Gzil	FW	1	0	1978	1978
Bolesław Habowski	FW	2	1	1937	1938
Stanisław Hachorek	FW	16	8	1955	1960
Tomasz Hajto	DF	62	6	1996	2005
Konstanty Haliszka	DF	3	0	1934	1935
Karol Hanke	MF	9	0	1924	1928
Krzysztof Hausner	FW	1	0	1967	1967
**Michał Helik**	DF	7	0	2021	2021
Zbigniew Hnatio	MF	1	0	1976	1976
Tadeusz Hogendorf	MF	6	2	1947	1949
Andrzej Iwan	FW	29	11	1978	1987
Tomasz Iwan	MF	40	4	1995	2002
Leszek Iwanicki	MF	2	0	1987	1987
**Maciej Iwański**	MF	10	2	2006	2010
Edward Jabłoński	MF	3	1	1939	1947
Marian Jabłoński	MF	3	0	1947	1949
**Jarosław Jach**	DF	2	0	2017	2017
Czesław Jakołcewicz	DF	15	0	1984	1991
Roman Jakóbczak	MF	5	2	1974	1976
Tadeusz Jakubczyk	DF	1	0	1977	1977
Ariel Jakubowski	DF	1	0	1999	1999
Jan Jałocha	DF/MF	28	1	1981	1985
Marcin Jałocha	DF	18	1	1992	1994
Paweł Janas	DF	53	1	1976	1984
**Dawid Janczyk**	FW	5	0	2008	2009
Henryk Janduda	DF	9	0	1948	1950
Paweł Janik	MF	1	0	1970	1970
Werner Janik	GK	7	0	1947	1948
Zdzisław Janik	MF	3	1	1991	1991
Henryk Janikowski	FW	3	2	1981	1981
Edward Jankowski	FW	10	4	1952	1961
**Maciej Jankowski**	FW	1	0	2011	2011
Ryszard Jankowski	GK	2	0	1988	1988
Roman Jańczyk	MF	1	0	1932	1932
Wiesław Jańczyk	MF	1	0	1957	1957
Engelbert Jarek	FW	3	1	1958	1962
Andrzej Jarosik	FW	25	11	1965	1972
Tomasz Jarzębowski	MF	2	0	2003	2004
Andrzej Jaskot	MF	1	0	1998	1998
Zbigniew Jaskowski	FW	1	0	1952	1952
Waldemar Jaskulski	DF	13	1	1993	1996
Henryk Jaźnicki	FW	1	0	1939	1939
Piotr Jegor	DF	20	1	1989	1997
**Ireneusz Jeleń**	FW	29	5	2003	2012
Klaus Jerominek	FW	1	0	1952	1952
Leszek Jezierski	FW	6	0	1954	1958
Artur Jędrzejczyk	DF	41	3	2010	2022
**Tomasz Jodłowiec**	DF/MF	49	1	2008	2016
Janusz Jojko	GK	2	0	1987	1994
Juliusz Joksch	DF	1	0	1936	1936
Mariusz Jop	DF	27	0	2003	2008
Jerzy Jóźwiak	FW	1	0	1962	1962
**Kamil Jóźwiak**	MF	22	3	2019	2021
Marek Jóźwiak	DF	14	0	1992	1998
Jerzy Jurowicz	GK	8	0	1947	1950
Andrzej Juskowiak	FW	39	13	1992	2001
Mirosław Justek	DF/MF/FW	3	0	1978	1978
Rafał Kaczmarczyk	MF	2	0	1996	1997
**Marcin Kaczmarek**	MF	2	0	2005	2005
Zbigniew Kaczmarek	MF	30	0	1985	1991
Kazimierz Kaczor	DF	3	0	1923	1925
Paweł Kaczorowski	DF	14	1	2000	2005
Aleksander Kahane	MF	3	0	1926	1927
Krzysztof Kajrys	MF	3	1	1981	1981
Grzegorz Kaliciak	DF	3	0	1996	1999
Zygmunt Kalinowski	GK	4	0	1973	1974
Arkadiusz Kaliszan	DF	1	0	2000	2000
**Jakub Kałuziński**	MF	1	0	2024	2024
Józef Kałuża	FW	16	7	1921	1928
Radosław Kałużny	DF/MF	41	11	1997	2005
**Jakub Kamiński**	MF	32	3	2021	—
**Marcin Kamiński**	DF	7	0	2011	2018
Zdzisław Kapka	MF	14	1	1973	1981
**Bartosz Kapustka**	MF	22	3	2015	—
Władysław Karasiak	DF	12	0	1924	1934
Jan Karaś	MF	16	1	1984	1988
Witold Karaś	FW	2	0	1974	1974
**Michał Karbownik**	MF	4	0	2020	2023
Bartosz Karwan	MF	22	4	1998	2005
Jan Karwecki	GK	5	0	1974	1975
Jerzy Kasalik	FW	3	1	1974	1974
Henryk Kasperczak	DF/MF	61	5	1973	1978
Witold Kasperski	MF/FW	1	0	1974	1974
Roman Kasprzyk	FW	2	0	1963	1963
Zenon Kasztelan	MF	6	1	1973	1973
Kazimierz Kaszuba	MF	3	0	1951	1954
Jan Kauder	MF	1	0	1953	1953
Władysław Kawula	DF	5	0	1960	1962
Jacek Kazimierski	GK	23	0	1981	1987
Przemysław Kaźmierczak	MF	12	1	2005	2013
Stanisław Kaźmierczak	MF	1	0	1947	1947
**Damian Kądzior**	MF	6	1	2018	2020
Antoni Keller	GK	2	0	1934	1935
Henryk Kempny	FW	16	6	1955	1958
Adam Kensy	MF	3	0	1983	1983
**Tomasz Kędziora**	DF	39	1	2017	—
Marian Kielec	FW	1	0	1962	1962
**Jacek Kiełb**	MF	2	0	2010	2010
Tomasz Kiełbowicz	DF	9	0	2000	2007
Marcin Kikut	DF	2	0	2010	2011
Marian Kiliński	GK	1	0	1924	1924
Stefan Kisieliński	GK	6	0	1926	1928
Walerian Kisieliński	FW	7	2	1931	1937
**Jakub Kiwior**	DF	50	2	2022	—
**Mateusz Klich**	MF	41	2	2011	2022
Józef Klotz	DF	2	1	1922	1922
Jan Kłaczek	GK	1	0	1953	1953
Aleksander Kłak	GK	11	0	1992	1997
Tomasz Kłos	DF	69	6	1998	2006
Filip Kmiciński	DF	1	0	1925	1925
Kazimierz Kmiecik	FW	34	8	1972	1980
Adam Knioła	FW	2	2	1931	1935
Andrzej Kobylański	MF	6	0	1992	1993
Adam Kogut	MF	1	0	1922	1922
Józef Kohut	FW	11	4	1948	1953
Adam Kokoszka	DF	11	2	2006	2014
Alfred Kokot	FW	1	1	1949	1949
Józef Kokot	FW	1	0	1954	1954
Robert Kolendowicz	MF	1	0	2006	2006
Antoni Komendo-Borowski	FW	1	1	1935	1935
Ryszard Komornicki	MF	20	0	1984	1988
Marcin Komorowski	DF	13	1	2008	2015
Marek Koniarek	FW	2	1	1986	1987
Edward Konietzny	FW	1	0	1927	1927
Tadeusz Konkiewicz	DF	1	0	1930	1930
Antoni Konopelski	DF	1	0	1956	1956
Józef Kopicera	FW	2	0	1974	1974
Józef Korbas	FW	2	4	1937	1938
Konrad Kornek	GK	15	0	1962	1967
Roman Korynt	DF	34	0	1952	1959
Tomasz Korynt	FW	1	0	1979	1979
Tomasz Kos	DF	3	0	2000	2002
**Jakub Kosecki**	MF	5	1	2012	2013
Roman Kosecki	FW	69	19	1988	1995
Kamil Kosowski	MF	52	4	2001	2009
Karol Kossok	FW	5	3	1928	1932
Hubert Kostka	GK	32	0	1962	1972
Marek Kostrzewa	DF	1	0	1987	1987
Zdzisław Kostrzewa	GK	3	0	1978	1981
**Rafał Kosznik**	DF	1	0	2013	2013
Antoni Kot	MF	1	0	1971	1971
Jan Kotlarczyk	MF	20	0	1928	1935
Józef Kotlarczyk	MF	30	0	1930	1937
Edmund Kowal	FW	8	1	1953	1958
Jacek Kowalczyk	DF	3	0	2003	2004
Marcin Kowalczyk	DF	8	0	2008	2013
Wojciech Kowalczyk	FW	39	11	1991	1999
Wojciech Kowalewski	GK	11	0	2002	2009
Janusz Kowalik	FW	6	0	1965	1966
Jan Kowalski	MF/FW	10	0	1960	1962
Paweł Kowalski	DF	4	0	1967	1967
Władysław Kowalski	FW	4	2	1923	1924
**Dawid Kownacki**	FW	7	1	2018	2021
Marian Kozerski	FW	8	2	1969	1971
**Kacper Kozłowski**	MF	8	0	2021	—
**Antoni Kozubal**	MF	1	0	2024	2024
Maksymilian Koźmin	GK	2	0	1930	1931
Marek Koźmiński	DF	45	1	1992	2002
Jerzy Kraska	DF/MF	13	0	1972	1973
Jerzy Krasówka	FW	5	0	1949	1953
Ryszard Kraus	FW	4	0	1991	1992
Paweł Król	DF	22	3	1981	1988
Władysław Król	FW	4	2	1933	1937
Zygmunt Krumholz	FW	1	0	1922	1922
Władysław Krupa	MF	1	0	1924	1924
Juliusz Kruszankin	DF	7	0	1986	1993
Grzegorz Krychowiak	MF	100	5	2008	2023
Waldemar Kryger	DF	5	1	1997	1998
Włodzimierz Krygier	MF	1	0	1928	1928
Paweł Kryszałowicz	FW	33	10	1999	2004
Kajetan Kryszkiewicz	MF/FW	2	0	1937	1937
Adolf Krzyk	GK	6	0	1937	1939
Jacek Krzynówek	MF	96	15	1998	2009
**Oskar Kubiak**	DF	2	0	2026	—
Dariusz Kubicki	DF	46	1	1982	1991
Eugeniusz Kubicki	FW	1	0	1948	1948
Arkadiusz Kubik	DF	2	0	1994	1994
Józef Kubiński	MF	3	0	1926	1928
Mirosław Kubisztal	FW	1	0	1989	1989
Wacław Kuchar	MF/FW	23	5	1921	1928
**Michał Kucharczyk**	MF/FW	9	1	2011	2015
Cezary Kucharski	MF/FW	17	3	1996	2002
Romuald Kujawa	DF	1	0	1991	1991
Mariusz Kukiełka	DF/MF	20	3	1997	2004
Zygmunt Kukla	GK	20	0	1976	1979
**Piotr Kuklis**	MF	2	0	2007	2008
Tomasz Kulawik	MF	2	0	1998	1998
Zygmunt Kulawik	FW	3	0	1939	1947
Janusz Kupcewicz	MF	20	5	1976	1983
**Tomasz Kupisz**	MF	4	0	2010	2013
**Rafał Kurzawa**	MF	7	0	2017	2018
Marek Kusto	FW	19	3	1974	1984
Tomasz Kuszczak	GK	11	0	2003	2012
Marcin Kuś	DF	7	0	2002	2008
Marcin Kuźba	FW	6	2	1995	2003
Zbigniew Kwaśniewski	MF	2	0	1978	1978
Józef Kwiatkowski	MF	7	1	1974	1975
Grzegorz Lato	FW	100	45	1971	1984
Rafał Lasocki	DF	3	1	2003	2004
Stefan Lasota	DF	1	0	1932	1932
Henryk Latocha	DF	8	0	1968	1970
Adam Ledwoń	DF/MF	18	1	1993	1998
Tomasz Lenart	DF	2	0	1995	1996
Roman Lentner	FW	32	7	1957	1966
Andrzej Lesiak	MF	18	1	1990	1993
Jan Lesiak	MF	1	0	1936	1936
Marek Leśniak	FW	20	10	1986	1994
Jan Leszczyński	DF	1	0	1968	1968
**Rafał Leszczyński**	GK	1	0	2014	2014
Bolesław Lewandowski	FW	1	0	1957	1957
Grzegorz Lewandowski	MF	5	0	1993	1996
Mariusz Lewandowski	DF/MF	66	5	2002	2013
**Robert Lewandowski**	FW	172	92	2008	—
**Igor Lewczuk**	DF	2	0	2014	2014
Jan Liberda	FW	35	8	1959	1967
Mariusz Liberda	GK	3	0	2002	2003
**Karol Linetty**	MF	47	5	2014	2023
Leszek Lipka	MF	21	1	1979	1981
**Tomasz Lisowski**	DF/MF	3	0	2007	2008
Jan Loth	GK/MF/FW	5	0	1921	1924
Stefan Loth	MF	1	0	1926	1926
Włodzimierz Lubański	FW	75	48	1963	1980
Paweł Lubina	MF	2	0	1926	1927
Jerzy Ludyga	DF	1	0	1977	1977
Jan Luxenburg	FW	1	0	1928	1928
Tomasz Łapiński	DF	36	0	1992	1999
Marian Łącz	FW	3	0	1949	1950
**Mateusz Łęgowski**	MF	1	0	2022	2022
Wojciech Łobodziński	MF	23	2	2006	2009
Marek Ługowski	DF	2	0	1987	1987
Antoni Łukasiewicz	DF	2	0	2008	2009
Damian Łukasik	DF	27	0	1985	1990
Daniel Łukasik	MF	5	1	2012	2013
Antoni Łyko	FW	2	0	1937	1938
Ryszard Łysakowski	FW	1	1	1934	1934
Alojzy Łysko	DF/FW	1	0	1964	1964
Józef Machnik	GK	2	0	1956	1956
Marian Machowski	FW	1	0	1956	1956
Krzysztof Maciejewski	DF	5	0	1991	1994
Henryk Maculewicz	DF	23	0	1974	1978
Łukasz Madej	MF	5	0	2003	2014
Edward Madejski	GK	11	0	1936	1938
**Piotr Madejski**	MF	1	0	2007	2007
Paweł Magdoń	DF	1	1	2006	2006
Horst Mahseli	DF/FW	9	0	1955	1958
Sławomir Majak	MF	22	0	1995	2000
Stanisław Majcher	GK	3	0	1966	1966
Radosław Majdan	GK	7	0	2000	2002
**Radosław Majecki**	GK	1	0	2021	2021
Adam Majewski	MF	1	0	2003	2003
**Radosław Majewski**	MF	9	0	2007	2013
Stefan Majewski	DF	40	4	1978	1986
Witold Majewski	MF	7	0	1958	1962
Edmund Majowski	FW	4	1	1933	1934
Bronisław Makowski	MF	1	0	1931	1931
**Maciej Makuszewski**	MF	5	0	2017	2017
Antoni Malczyk	GK	2	0	1925	1925
Stanisław Malczyk	FW	3	1	1932	1935
Leonard Malik	FW	1	1	1930	1930
**Patryk Małecki**	MF/FW	8	1	2009	2011
Maciej Małkowski	MF	2	0	2008	2009
**Sebastian Małkowski**	GK	1	0	2011	2011
Tadeusz Małnowicz	FW	1	0	1978	1978
Józef Mamoń	MF/FW	9	2	1949	1952
Ryszard Mańko	FW	1	0	1970	1970
Adam Marciniak	DF	2	0	2013	2013
Dariusz Marciniak	FW	5	1	1987	1988
**Filip Marchwiński**	MF	2	0	2023	2023
Artur Marczewski	DF	1	0	1921	1921
**Dominik Marczuk**	MF	1	1	2024	2024
Marian Markiewicz	DF	3	0	1924	1924
Henryk Martyna	DF	23	4	1930	1936
Joachim Marx	FW	23	10	1966	1975
Marian Masłoń	DF	2	0	1956	1956
Michał Masłowski	MF	3	0	2014	2014
Klaus Masseli	GK	1	0	1966	1966
Zygmunt Maszczyk	MF/FW	36	0	1968	1976
Bohdan Masztaler	MF/FW	22	2	1970	1978
Radosław Matusiak	FW	15	7	2006	2008
**Adam Matuszczyk**	MF	21	1	2010	2013
Michał Matyas	GK	18	7	1932	1939
Adam Matysek	GK	34	0	1991	2002
Waldemar Matysik	MF	55	0	1980	1989
Włodzimierz Mazur	FW	23	3	1976	1982
**Bartosz Mazurek**	MF	1	0	2026	—
Tomasz Mazurkiewicz	MF	1	0	2003	2003
Krzysztof Mączyński	MF	31	2	2013	2018
Krystian Michallik	DF	2	0	1966	1968
Erwin Michalski	DF	4	0	1935	1935
Radosław Michalski	MF	28	0	1993	2000
Adam Michel	DF	3	0	1959	1960
Grzegorz Mielcarski	FW	10	1	1991	1998
Stanisław Mielech	FW	2	0	1921	1922
Adrian Mierzejewski	MF	41	3	2010	2013
Łukasz Mierzejewski	DF	5	0	2010	2010
Marcin Mięciel	FW	5	1	1996	2002
Zbigniew Mikołajów	FW	3	0	1980	1980
Henryk Mikunda	MF	1	0	1939	1939
Sebastian Mila	MF	38	8	2003	2015
Andrzej Milczarski	FW	1	0	1980	1980
August Milde	DF	3	0	1926	1926
Ryszard Milewski	DF	3	0	1980	1981
**Arkadiusz Milik**	FW	72	17	2012	2024
Edward Miller	MF	1	0	1936	1936
Juliusz Miller	FW	6	1	1923	1924
Henryk Miłoszewicz	MF	9	0	1980	1980
Michał Miśkiewicz	GK	1	0	2014	2014
Józef Młynarczyk	GK	42	0	1979	1986
Filip Modelski	DF	1	0	2011	2011
**Jakub Moder**	MF	36	2	2020	—
Fryderyk Monica	DF	13	0	1959	1963
Zdzisław Mordarski	MF	12	2	1948	1954
Kazimierz Moskal	DF/MF	6	1	1990	1994
Olgierd Moskalewicz	MF	1	0	2000	2000
Tomasz Moskała	FW	1	0	2002	2002
Marek Motyka	DF	8	0	1980	1980
Mariusz Mowlik	DF	1	0	2004	2004
Piotr Mowlik	GK	21	0	1974	1981
Roman Mrugała	GK	2	0	1938	1938
Maciej Murawski	DF	6	0	1998	2002
**Rafał Murawski**	MF	48	1	2006	2012
Adam Musiał	DF	34	0	1968	1974
Jerzy Musiałek	FW	13	1	1961	1967
Zbigniew Myga	MF	1	0	1966	1966
Aleksander Mysiak	MF	13	0	1930	1934
Maciej Nalepa	GK	2	0	2003	2004
Adam Nawałka	MF	34	1	1977	1980
Janusz Nawrocki	DF	23	0	1989	1991
Józef Nawrot	FW	19	16	1928	1935
Andrzej Niedzielan	FW	19	5	2002	2010
Antoni Nieroba	DF/MF	17	0	1959	1967
Zbigniew Niziński	FW	1	0	1922	1922
Marian Norkowski	FW	6	1	1958	1960
Mariusz Nosal	FW	1	0	1999	1999
**Marcin Nowacki**	MF	1	0	2004	2004
Dawid Nowak	FW	8	0	2008	2011
Helmut Nowak	MF	2	0	1956	1957
Krzysztof Nowak	MF	10	1	1997	1999
Piotr Nowak	MF	19	3	1990	1997
Tadeusz Nowak	FW	2	0	1972	1977
**Tomasz Nowak**	MF	3	1	2010	2010
**Wiktor Nowak**	MF	6	0	2026	—
Marian Nowara	FW	2	0	1958	1958
Jarosław Nowicki	FW	4	1	1981	1981
Erwin Nyc	DF/MF	11	0	1937	1939
Ludovic Obraniak	MF	34	6	2009	2014
Zygmunt Ochmański	MF	1	0	1949	1949
Roman Ogaza	FW	21	6	1974	1981
Mirosław Okoński	MF	29	2	1977	1987
Władysław Olearczyk	DF	4	0	1923	1925
Alfred Olek	DF/MF	1	0	1970	1970
Emmanuel Olisadebe	FW	25	11	2000	2004
**Paweł Olkowski**	DF	13	0	2013	2015
Lechosław Olsza	MF	2	0	1976	1976
Arkadiusz Onyszko	GK	2	0	1997	1997
Józef Oprych	MF	1	0	1948	1948
Jerzy Orłowski	MF	1	0	1954	1954
Paweł Orzechowski	DF	4	0	1964	1966
Marian Ostafiński	DF	11	0	1971	1975
Marek Ostrowski	MF	37	1	1981	1987
Stanisław Oślizło	DF	57	1	1961	1971
Jerzy Otfinowski	GK	1	0	1932	1932
Zygmunt Otto	MF	1	0	1924	1924
**Maxi Oyedele**	MF	2	0	2024	2024
Jan Pająk	DF	2	0	1933	1934
Wiesław Pajor	GK	1	0	1954	1954
Hubert Pala	DF/MF/FW	3	0	1960	1960
Sławomir Paluch	MF	2	0	1997	1997
Andrzej Pałasz	FW	34	7	1980	1985
Tadeusz Parpan	DF/MF	20	1	1947	1950
Grzegorz Pater	MF	1	0	2001	2001
Rezső Patkoló	FW	3	0	1949	1952
Mariusz Pawelec	DF	2	0	2007	2008
**Mariusz Pawełek**	GK	4	0	2006	2010
Krzysztof Pawlak	DF	31	1	1983	1987
Mariusz Pawlak	DF/MF	1	0	2000	2000
Longin Pawłowski	FW	1	0	1937	1937
Szymon Pawłowski	MF	17	2	2007	2014
Tadeusz Pawłowski	MF/FW	5	0	1976	1979
Władysław Pawłowski	GK	2	0	1937	1937
**Michał Pazdan**	DF	38	0	2007	2019
Karol Pazurek	FW	16	4	1927	1935
Stanisław Paździor	DF	1	0	1972	1972
**Patryk Peda**	DF	3	0	2023	2023
Damien Perquis	DF	14	1	2011	2013
Sławomir Peszko	MF	44	2	2008	2018
Teodor Peterek	FW	9	6	1931	1938
Mirosław Pękala	MF	6	1	1981	1987
Antoni Piasecki	GK	1	0	1935	1935
**Krzysztof Piątek**	FW	39	12	2018	—
Leonard Piątek	FW	17	11	1936	1939
**Kamil Piątkowski**	DF	8	1	2021	—
Jerzy Piec	MF	6	1	1937	1947
Ryszard Piec	FW	21	3	1935	1939
**Arkadiusz Piech**	FW	4	0	2011	2012
Grzegorz Piechna	FW	1	1	2005	2005
Piotr Piechniak	MF	3	0	2003	2007
Antoni Piechniczek	DF/MF	3	0	1967	1969
Mariusz Piekarski	MF	2	0	1998	2002
Joachim Pierzyna	DF	1	0	1962	1962
Dariusz Pietrasiak	DF	2	0	2010	2010
Henryk Pietrek	GK	1	0	1963	1963
**Rafał Pietrzak**	DF	2	0	2018	2018
**Oskar Pietuszewski**	MF	6	0	2026	—
**Jakub Piotrowski**	MF	14	2	2023	—
Krzysztof Piskuła	MF	1	0	1999	1999
Leszek Pisz	MF	14	1	1990	1996
Łukasz Piszczek	DF	66	3	2007	2019
Dawid Plizga	MF	3	1	2010	2014
**Przemysław Płacheta**	MF	7	0	2020	2022
Zbigniew Płaszewski	DF	5	0	1976	1980
Jacek Płuciennik	FW	4	0	1994	1997
Alfred Pochopień	FW	1	0	1939	1939
Jerzy Podbrożny	FW	6	0	1991	1995
Ernest Pohl	FW	46	39	1955	1965
Ryszard Polak	FW	1	0	1975	1975
Tadeusz Polak	MF	2	0	1972	1972
Eugen Polanski	MF	19	0	2011	2014
Piotr Polczak	DF	5	0	2008	2009
Kazimierz Polok	MF	5	0	1961	1963
Stefan Popiel	GK	2	0	1922	1923
**Łukasz Poręba**	MF	1	0	2026	—
**Kacper Potulski**	DF	4	1	2026	—
Waldemar Prusik	MF	49	5	1983	1991
Władysław Prymka	FW	1	0	1922	1922
Jan Przecherka	FW	4	0	1948	1948
Andrzej Przeworski	GK	1	0	1922	1922
Henryk Przeździecki	MF	1	0	1935	1935
Władysław Przybysz	FW	1	0	1928	1928
Kazimierz Przybyś	DF	15	0	1985	1987
Witold Przykucki	MF	1	0	1928	1928
Sebastian Przyrowski	GK	9	0	2005	2010
Stanisław Ptak	MF	1	0	1927	1927
**Tymoteusz Puchacz**	DF	16	0	2021	—
Zdzisław Puszkarz	MF	1	0	1975	1975
Aleksander Pychowski	DF	3	0	1925	1926
**Arkadiusz Pyrka**	DF	5	0	2025	—
Franciszek Pytel	FW	1	1	1937	1937
Patryk Rachwał	MF	4	0	2003	2005
Leon Radojewski	FW	1	1	1932	1932
Arkadiusz Radomski	MF	30	0	2003	2008
Marcin Radzewicz	MF	2	0	2003	2003
Czesław Rajtar	FW	1	0	1952	1952
Grzegorz Rasiak	FW	37	8	2002	2007
Krzysztof Ratajczyk	DF	16	3	1994	2003
**Arkadiusz Reca**	DF	15	0	2018	2022
Izydor Redler	DF	1	0	1926	1926
**Marcel Reguła**	MF	4	1	2026	—
Piotr Reiss	FW	4	1	1998	2000
Andrzej Rewilak	DF	1	0	1966	1966
Henryk Reyman	FW	9	5	1922	1931
Otto Riesner	FW	6	0	1931	1935
Marcin Robak	FW	9	1	2010	2014
Ryszard Robakiewicz	FW	3	0	1987	1988
Zbigniew Robakiewicz	GK	1	0	1994	1994
**Taras Romanczuk**	MF	5	1	2018	2024
**Filip Rózga**	MF	4	0	2025	—
Lucjan Rudnicki	GK	1	0	1936	1936
Jan Rudnow	DF	1	0	1968	1968
Andrzej Rudy	MF	16	3	1986	1998
Wojciech Rudy	MF	39	1	1974	1981
Henryk Rybicki	GK	3	0	1949	1949
**Maciej Rybus**	DF	66	2	2009	2021
**Bartosz Rymaniak**	DF	1	0	2012	2012
Tomasz Rząsa	DF	36	1	1994	2006
Mirosław Rzepa	DF	1	0	1992	1992
Marek Rzepka	DF	15	1	1991	1993
Piotr Rzepka	MF	7	1	1981	1989
Krzysztof Rześny	DF	6	0	1973	1976
**Jakub Rzeźniczak**	DF	9	0	2008	2014
Dariusz Rzeźniczek	MF	2	0	1996	1997
Jerzy Sadek	FW	18	6	1965	1971
**Maciej Sadlok**	DF	15	0	2009	2011
Marek Saganowski	FW	35	5	1996	2012
**Bartosz Salamon**	DF	15	0	2013	2024
Grzegorz Sandomierski	GK	3	0	2010	2011
Wacław Sąsiadek	FW	3	0	1948	1954
Marian Schaller	MF/FW	4	0	1930	1934
Maciej Scherfchen	MF	2	0	2004	2006
Fryderyk Scherfke	FW	12	1	1932	1938
Jan Schmidt	FW	1	1	1961	1961
Zygmunt Schmidt	FW	13	0	1966	1969
Ludwik Schneider	MF	2	0	1923	1926
Hieronim Schwartz	FW	1	1	1936	1936
Bronisław Seichter	MF	2	0	1928	1930
Kazimierz Seichter	MF	3	0	1925	1927
Rafał Siadaczka	DF	17	2	1995	1999
Paweł Sibik	MF	3	0	2002	2002
Kazimierz Sidorczuk	GK	14	0	1990	1999
**Adrian Sikora**	FW	2	1	2003	2003
Andrzej Sikorski	DF	1	0	1986	1986
Andrzej Sikorski	GK	1	0	1974	1974
Witold Sikorski	FW	2	0	1981	1981
**Łukasz Skorupski**	GK	20	0	2012	—
Hubert Skowronek	MF/FW	1	0	1966	1966
**Michał Skóraś**	MF	18	0	2022	—
Piotr Skrobowski	DF	15	0	1980	1984
Henryk Skromny	GK	7	0	1947	1952
Emil Skrynkowicz	DF	1	0	1931	1931
Dariusz Skrzypczak	MF	7	0	1991	1992
**Mateusz Skrzypczak**	DF	2	0	2025	—
Paweł Skrzypek	DF	10	0	1996	1997
**Bartosz Slisz**	MF	26	1	2021	—
Zygfryd Słoma	DF/MF	2	0	1950	1950
Waldemar Słomiany	DF	1	0	1963	1963
Józef Słonecki	FW	6	0	1923	1925
**Jakub Słowik**	GK	1	0	2013	2013
Józef Smoczek	FW	4	2	1930	1935
Ebi Smolarek	FW	47	20	2002	2010
Włodzimierz Smolarek	FW	60	13	1980	1992
Bolesław Smólski	FW	1	0	1947	1947
Stanisław Sobczyński	DF	6	0	1974	1974
Paweł Sobek	FW	5	1	1952	1953
Artur Sobiech	FW	13	2	2010	2015
Krzysztof Sobieski	GK	2	0	1977	1977
Franciszek Sobkowiak	MF	1	0	1938	1938
Jan Sobol	MF	2	0	1977	1979
Radosław Sobolewski	MF	32	1	2003	2007
Józef Sobota	FW	1	1	1926	1926
Waldemar Sobota	MF	17	4	2011	2014
Piotr Soczyński	DF	30	1	1989	1992
Kazimierz Sokołowski	DF	2	0	1985	1986
Tomasz Sokołowski	MF	12	1	1994	1998
Władysław Soporek	FW	2	0	1957	1958
Łukasz Sosin	FW	4	2	2006	2009
Leon Sperling	FW	16	2	1921	1930
Henryk Spodzieja	FW	9	3	1947	1949
Marian Spoida	MF	14	0	1922	1928
Zenon Sroczyński	DF/MF	1	0	1935	1935
Władysław Stachurski	DF	8	1	1969	1970
Joachim Stachuła	MF/FW	1	0	1969	1969
Wawrzyniec Staliński	FW	13	11	1922	1928
Ryszard Staniek	MF	12	0	1992	1996
**Filip Starzyński**	MF	4	1	2014	2016
Michał Stasiak	DF	3	0	2003	2004
Janusz Stawarz	GK	2	0	1981	1981
Tomasz Stefaniszyn	GK	12	0	1952	1960
Grzegorz Stencel	GK	1	0	1988	1988
Zygmunt Steuermann	FW	2	4	1926	1928
**Mariusz Stępiński**	FW	4	0	2013	2017
Maciej Stolarczyk	DF	8	0	1994	2005
Henryk Stroniarz	GK	1	0	1965	1965
**Karol Struski**	MF	1	0	2023	2023
Roman Strzałkowski	DF	18	1	1966	1970
Marceli Strzykalski	MF	17	0	1952	1961
Zdzisław Styczeń	MF	5	0	1921	1924
Stefan Sumara	FW	1	0	1938	1938
Łukasz Surma	MF	5	0	2002	2003
Piotr Suski	MF	19	0	1961	1967
Czesław Suszczyk	MF	25	0	1949	1958
Janusz Sybis	FW	18	2	1976	1980
Andrzej Sykta	FW	2	1	1959	1962
Tadeusz Synowiec	MF/FW	8	0	1921	1924
Igor Sypniewski	FW	2	0	1999	2001
Ludwik Szabakiewicz	FW	2	0	1925	1928
Bolesław Szadkowski	DF	7	0	1968	1969
Grzegorz Szamotulski	GK	13	0	1996	2003
Andrzej Szarmach	FW	61	32	1973	1982
Władysław Szaryński	FW	2	0	1970	1970
Zbigniew Szarzyński	FW	6	3	1957	1965
Marek Szczech	GK	2	0	1987	1987
Władysław Szczepaniak	FW	34	0	1930	1947
Henryk Szczepański	DF/MF/FW	45	0	1957	1965
Maciej Szczęsny	GK	7	0	1991	1996
**Wojciech Szczęsny**	GK	84	0	2009	2024
Mieczysław Szczurek	DF/MF	5	0	1947	1950
Stefan Szefer	DF	3	0	1966	1967
Marian Szeja	GK	15	0	1965	1973
Józef Szewczyk	MF	1	0	1978	1978
Mieczysław Szewczyk	MF	1	0	1987	1987
Roman Szewczyk	DF/MF	37	3	1989	1994
Mirosław Sznaucner	DF	2	0	2003	2003
Zygfryd Szołtysik	MF/FW	46	10	1963	1972
Ryszard Szpakowski	FW	1	0	1974	1974
Dariusz Szubert	MF	3	0	1994	1994
Łukasz Szukała	DF	17	1	2013	2015
Mieczysław Szumiec	GK	1	0	1926	1926
Krystian Szuster	MF	3	0	1989	1989
Rafał Szwed	DF	1	0	1999	1999
Witold Szyguła	GK	3	0	1963	1970
Antoni Szymanowski	DF	82	1	1970	1980
Henryk Szymanowski	DF	1	0	1979	1979
**Damian Szymański**	MF	18	2	2018	2024
**Sebastian Szymański**	MF	60	7	2019	—
Henryk Szymborski	FW	6	0	1951	1958
Ryszard Szymczak	MF/FW	2	0	1972	1972
Edward Szymkowiak	GK	53	0	1952	1965
Mirosław Szymkowiak	MF	33	3	1997	2006
Antoni Śledź	FW	1	0	1924	1924
Stefan Śliwa	MF/FW	3	0	1922	1923
Maciej Śliwowski	FW	9	0	1989	1993
**Bartosz Ślusarski**	FW	2	0	2005	2005
Włodzimierz Śpiewak	DF	8	0	1962	1964
Mariusz Śrutwa	FW	5	0	1996	1998
Tadeusz Świątek	MF	1	0	1986	1986
Tadeusz Świcarz	FW	5	0	1947	1949
**Karol Świderski**	FW	56	14	2021	—
Marek Świerczewski	DF	6	0	1994	1995
Piotr Świerczewski	MF	70	1	1992	2003
**Jakub Świerczok**	FW	6	1	2017	2021
Ryszard Tarasiewicz	MF	58	9	1984	1991
Mieczysław Tarka	DF	2	0	1948	1949
Eryk Tatuś	GK	1	0	1936	1936
Łukasz Teodorczyk	FW	19	4	2013	2018
Maciej Terlecki	MF	1	0	1999	1999
Stanisław Terlecki	MF/FW	29	7	1976	1980
Franciszek Tim	MF	1	0	1952	1952
Mirosław Tłokiński	DF/MF/FW	2	0	1981	1983
Grzegorz Tomala	GK	1	0	1999	1999
Jan Tomaszewski	GK	63	0	1971	1981
Jakub Tosik	DF/MF	2	0	2010	2010
Łukasz Trałka	MF	7	0	2008	2012
Kazimierz Trampisz	FW	10	3	1950	1958
Antoni Trzaskowski	DF	1	0	1971	1971
Mirosław Trzeciak	FW	22	8	1991	1999
Aleksander Tupalski	FW	3	1	1925	1926
Edmund Twórz	DF	6	0	1937	1939
Wojciech Tyc	FW	1	0	1977	1977
Sebastian Tyrała	MF	1	0	2008	2008
**Przemysław Tytoń**	GK	14	0	2010	2016
Ewald Urban	FW	6	2	1932	1934
Jan Urban	FW	57	7	1985	1991
Krzysztof Urbanowicz	DF	4	0	1983	1984
**Kacper Urbański**	MF	14	0	2024	—
Czesław Uznański	FW	3	0	1956	1956
Adam Walczak	DF	4	1	1980	1981
Józef Walczak	DF	2	0	1954	1956
Waldemar Waleszczyk	DF	1	0	1985	1985
Krystian Walot	DF	1	0	1981	1981
**Sebastian Walukiewicz**	DF	10	1	2020	—
Józef Wandzik	GK	52	0	1985	1995
Krzysztof Warzycha	FW	50	9	1984	1997
Robert Warzycha	MF	47	7	1987	1993
Jan Wasiewicz	MF	11	1	1935	1938
Marcin Wasilewski	DF	60	2	2002	2013
Tadeusz Waśko	MF	7	0	1948	1948
Henryk Wawrowski	DF	25	0	1974	1978
Jakub Wawrzyniak	DF	49	1	2006	2016
Tomasz Wałdoch	DF	74	2	1991	2002
Dariusz Wdowczyk	DF	53	2	1984	1992
**Bartłomiej Wdowik**	DF	1	0	2023	2023
Witold Wenclewski	DF	5	0	1987	1988
Zdzislaw Wesołowski	FW	1	0	1951	1951
Grzegorz Wędzyński	MF	2	0	1998	1999
Kazimierz Węgrzyn	DF	20	0	1991	1999
Artur Wichniarek	FW	17	4	1999	2008
Bogusław Widawski	DF	1	0	1959	1959
Henryk Wieczorek	DF/MF	17	2	1973	1979
Józef Wieczorek	MF	2	0	1953	1953
Teodor Wieczorek	DF/MF	10	0	1949	1953
Teodor Wieliszek	DF	1	0	1926	1926
Jakub Wierzchowski	GK	2	0	2000	2002
**Mateusz Wieteska**	DF	6	0	2022	—
Tomasz Wieszczycki	MF	11	3	1994	2000
Jerzy Wijas	DF/MF	17	0	1983	1989
Erwin Wilczek	MF/FW	16	2	1961	1969
Kamil Wilczek	FW	3	0	2016	2017
Franciszek Wilczkiewicz	MF	2	0	1931	1932
Jan Wilim	MF	3	0	1966	1966
Jerzy Wilim	FW	8	4	1963	1969
Ernest Wilimowski	FW	22	21	1934	1939
Cezary Wilk	MF	2	0	2010	2011
**Jakub Wilk**	MF	3	0	2009	2009
Maciej Wilusz	DF	4	0	2014	2014
Walter Winkler	DF	23	0	1966	1971
Jan Wiśniewski	FW	9	1	1949	1952
Mieczysław Wiśniewski	GK	6	0	1922	1924
**Przemysław Wiśniewski**	DF	9	1	2025	—
Ewald Wiśniowski	FW	1	1	1953	1953
Jan Włodarczyk	DF	6	0	1947	1948
Piotr Włodarczyk	FW	4	2	1999	2004
Gerard Wodarz	FW	28	9	1932	1939
Jan Wojciechowski	MF	2	0	1928	1930
Sławomir Wojciechowski	MF	4	0	1997	1997
Włodzimierz Wojciechowski	FW	3	0	1972	1973
Paweł Wojtala	DF	12	0	1994	1997
Grzegorz Wojtkowiak	DF	23	0	2008	2014
Rudolf Wojtowicz	DF	1	0	1978	1978
**Norbert Wojtuszek**	DF	4	0	2026	—
**Rafał Wolski**	MF	7	1	2012	2017
Hubert Wołąkiewicz	DF	4	0	2010	2011
Jerzy Wostal	FW	10	4	1936	1939
Andrzej Woźniak	GK	20	0	1994	1997
**Arkadiusz Woźniak**	DF/MF	1	0	2011	2011
Artur Woźniak	FW	5	0	1933	1938
Jerzy Woźniak	DF	35	0	1955	1962
Roman Wójcicki	DF	62	2	1978	1989
**Oskar Wójcik**	DF	1	0	2026	—
Stanisław Wójcik	FW	1	1	1927	1927
Wiesław Wraga	FW	1	0	1986	1986
Jan Wraży	DF	7	0	1968	1972
Michał Wróbel	FW	3	0	1979	1979
**Paweł Wszołek**	MF	20	3	2012	—
Zbigniew Wyciszkiewicz	MF	3	0	1996	1996
Bogusław Wyparło	GK	3	0	1998	1999
Witold Wypijewski	FW	5	2	1928	1934
Jerzy Wyrobek	DF	15	1	1970	1977
Ryszard Wyrobek	GK	2	0	1954	1956
**Mateusz Zachara**	FW	2	0	2014	2014
Tomasz Zahorski	FW	13	1	2007	2009
Bogdan Zając	DF	1	0	1998	1998
Marcin Zając	MF	11	0	1997	2005
Marek Zając	DF	2	0	2000	2001
**Nicola Zalewski**	MF	42	4	2021	—
Edward Załężny	DF	4	0	1980	1980
Łukasz Załuska	GK	1	0	2009	2009
Franciszek Zastawniak	DF	2	0	1927	1928
Tadeusz Zastawniak	MF	8	0	1925	1928
Tomasz Zdebel	MF	14	0	2000	2003
Adam Zejer	MF	5	0	1987	1991
Andrzej Zgutczyński	FW	5	0	1985	1986
Jacek Zieliński	DF	60	1	1995	2003
**Michał Zieliński**	FW	1	0	2008	2008
**Piotr Zieliński**	MF	114	18	2013	—
Edmund Zientara	MF/FW	40	1	1950	1961
Marek Zieńczuk	MF	9	0	2002	2008
Adolf Zimmer	FW	1	0	1934	1934
Mieczysław Zimowski	FW	1	0	1923	1923
Jacek Ziober	FW	46	8	1988	1993
**Jan Ziółkowski**	DF	3	0	2025	—
Symplicjusz Zwierzewski	FW	3	0	1926	1932
Andrzej Zygmunt	DF	1	0	1971	1971
Marcin Żewłakow	FW	25	5	2000	2004
Michał Żewłakow	DF	102	3	1999	2011
Józef Żiżka	DF/MF	2	0	1934	1936
Janusz Żmijewski	FW	15	7	1965	1969
Władysław Żmuda	DF	91	2	1973	1986
**Mateusz Żukowski**	FW	6	0	2026	—
Dariusz Żuraw	DF	1	0	2005	2005
Maciej Żurawski	FW	72	17	1998	2008
**Szymon Żurkowski**	MF	7	0	2022	2022
Michał Żyro	MF	4	0	2014	2014
