= List of Poland international footballers born outside Poland =

A number of the male footballers who have reached international status with Poland were not born in the country. Some were born outside of the country and moved there at a young age while others became naturalised citizens of Poland. The Poland national football team was formed in 1921 and exists to this day, with a break between 1939 and 1946 during World War II. During this period, Poland underwent significant territorial changes after the war, involving the loss of its eastern territories to the Soviet Union and the acquisition of western lands previously belonging to Germany. The following list takes these changes into account. For example, Kazimierz Górski, born in 1921 in Lviv, is not included on this list, whereas Taras Romanczuk, born in 1991 in Kovel, is, because both cities were part of Poland before 1945, but since then they are part of Ukraine.

== List of players ==
As of match played 31 March 2026

Name	Poland caps	Years active	Date of	Country of birth	Place of birth
Jerzy Bułanow	22	1922–1935		Russian Empire	Moscow
Aleksander Tupalski	3	1925–1926		Germany	Gelsenkirchen
Stefan Kisieliński	6	1926–1928		Czechia (then Austro-Hungary)	Moravská Ostrava
Witold Wypijewski	5	1928–1934		Uzbekistan (then Russian Empire)	Tashkent
Leon Radojewski	1	1932		Germany	Datteln
Hieronim Schwartz	1	1936		Germany	Berlin
Antoni Böttcher	1	1937		Germany	Berlin
Adolf Krzyk	6	1937–1939		Czechia (then Austro-Hungary)	Moravská Ostrava
Franciszek Sobkowiak	1	1938		Germany	Essen
Józef Oprych	1	1948		Czechia (then Czechoslovakia)	Moravská Ostrava
Henryk Bobula	5	1948		Russia	Omsk
Rudolf Patkolo	3	1949–1952		Hungary	Budapest
Jan Wiśniewski	9	1949–1952		Denmark	Ringsted
Czesław Ciupa	3	1956–1957		France	Mont-Bonvillers
Jan Liberda	35	1959–1967	26 November 1936	Germany	Bytom
Marian Kielec	1	1962		Romania	Câmpulung Moldovenesc
Paweł (Werner) Orzechowski	4	1964–1966	15 December 1941	Germany	Bytom
Jan Banaś	31	1964–1973		Germany	Berlin
Piotr Czaja	2	1970		Germany	Lindenbrück
Tadeusz Polak	2	1972		Austria (then Germany)	Kleinreifling
Emmanuel Olisadebe	25	2000–2004		Nigeria	Warri
Vahan Gevorgyan	1	2004		Armenia	Yerevan
Roger Guerreiro	25	2008–2011		Brazil	São Paulo
Ludovic Obraniak	34	2009–2014		France	Longeville-lès-Metz
Damien Perquis	14	2011–2013		France	Troyes
Thiago Cionek	21	2014–2018		Brazil	Curitiba
Taras Romanczuk	5	2018–		Ukraine	Kovel
Matty Cash	25	2021–		England	Slough
Nicola Zalewski	34	2021–		Italy	Tivoli
Maxi Oyedele	2	2024–		England	Salford

== List by country of birth ==
Country	Total
Germany	9
Czechia	3
France	3
Brazil	2
England	2
Russia	2
Armenia	1
Austria	1
Denmark	1
Italy	1
Hungary	1
Nigeria	1
Romania	1
Ukraine	1
Uzbekistan	1

== See also ==
- List of Poland international footballers
- Polish nationality law
