= Lucjan Rudnicki =

Lucjan Rudnicki may refer to:

- Lucjan Rudnicki (footballer)
- Lucjan Rudnicki (politician)
