= Eugeniusz Olszyna =

Polish footballer (1954–2023)

Personal information
- Date of birth: 10 February 1954
- Place of birth: Poznań, Poland
- Date of death: 5 March 2023 (aged 69)
- Place of death: Gniezno, Poland
- Height: 1.80 m (5 ft 11 in)
- Position: Striker

Youth career
- Warta Poznań

Senior career*
Years	Team	Apps	(Gls)
–1971	Warta Poznań		
1971–1976	Lech Poznań	39	(3)
1976–1980	Mieszko Gniezno		
- * Club domestic league appearances and goals

Eugeniusz Olszyna (10 February 1954 – 5 March 2023) was a Polish footballer who played as a striker.

Born in Poznań, Olszyna spent the majority of his career at clubs in his hometown city. He started at Warta before promptly moving to Lech in 1971 aged 17.

He made his Lech debut soon after his 20th birthday. He was mostly a backup player, often coming off the bench, assisting the star players and acting as a playmaker for them.

His career high came between 1974 and 1976, noting 39 appearances and 3 goals in the Ekstraklasa, another 2 goals in 3 appearances in the Polish Cup. Despite being a supporting player to the two main strikers Włodzimierz Wojciechowski and Ryszard Szpakowski, he remained a popular player.

He moved to Mieszko Gniezno in 1976 where he ended his career in 1980.

He died on 5 March 2023 in Gniezno aged 69 and was buried at St Paul and Peter's cemetery in Gniezno.
