= Domański =

Domański (feminine Domańska) is a Polish surname, and may refer to:

- Agnieszka Domańska (born 1975), Polish ice dancer
- Andrzej Domański (born 1981), Polish economist, and politician
- Bartosz Domański (born 1980), Polish figure skater
- Bolesław Domański (1872–1939), Polish Catholic priest
- Don Domanski (1950–2020), Canadian poet
- Janina Domańska (1913–1995), Polish artist, author and illustrator
- Joanna Domańska (born 1959), Polish classical pianist and music teacher
- Kasia Domanska (born 1972), Polish painter
- Maciej Domański (born 1990), Polish footballer
- Marika Domanski-Lyfors (born 1960), Swedish footballer
- Przemysław Domański (born 1986), Polish figure skater
- Stefan Domański (1904–1961), Polish footballer
