= Malczyk =

Malczyk is a surname. Notable people with the surname include:

- Antoni Malczyk (1902–1972), Polish footballer, brother of Stanisław
- Stanisław Malczyk (1910–1973), Polish footballer, brother of Antoni
