= Kauder =

Kauder is a surname. Notable people with the surname include:

- Hugo Kauder (1888–1972), 20th-century Austrian composer
- Jan Kauder (1931–1990), Polish footballer
- Reinhold Kauder (born 1950), German slalom canoeist
- Siegfried Kauder (born 1950), German politician (CDU)
- Volker Kauder (born 1949), German lawyer and politician (CDU)
