= Drapała =

Drapała is a Polish surname. It may refer to:

- Jan Drapała (1899–1945), Polish footballer
- Marika Popowicz-Drapała (born 1988), Polish track and field athlete
