= Szpakowski =

Szpakowski (feminine Szpakowska) is a Polish surname. Notable people with the surname include:

- Dariusz Szpakowski (born 1951), Polish sports commentator
- Michał Szpakowski (born 1989), Polish rower
- Ryszard Szpakowski (born 1951), Polish footballer
