= Uznański =

Uznański is a surname. Notable people with the surname include:

- Aleksandra Uznańska-Wiśniewska (born 1994), Polish politician
- Czesław Uznański (1930–2014), Polish footballer
- Sławosz Uznański-Wiśniewski (born 1984), Polish engineer
