= Walczak =

Surname list

Walczak is a Polish surname. Notable people with the surname include:

- Adam Walczak, Polish footballer
- Bill Walczak, candidate for Mayor of Boston
- Damian Walczak, Polish cyclist
- Diana Walczak, American sculptor
- Ed Walczak (1915–1998), American baseball player
- Józef Walczak (1931–2016), Polish football manager
- Krzysztof Walczak, Polish footballer
- Mark Walczak, American football player
- Patryk Walczak, Polish handball player
- Ruth Walczak, British rower
- Tomasz Walczak, Polish footballer
- Witold Walczak, American lawyer
