= Henryk Frymarkiewicz =

Polish footballer

Personal information
- Date of birth: 10 July 1910
- Place of birth: Łódź, Poland
- Date of death: 6 August 1975 (aged 65)
- Place of death: Łódź, Poland
- Height: 1.86 m (6 ft 1 in)
- Position: Goalkeeper

Senior career*
| Years | Team | Apps | (Gls) |
| 1931–1935 | ŁKS Łódź | | |
| 1936–1938 | Unia Lublin | | |
| 1938–1939 | LWS Łódź | | |

International career
| 1934 | Poland | 1 | (0) |
- * Club domestic league appearances and goals

Henryk Frymarkiewicz (10 July 1910 – 6 August 1975) was a Polish footballer who played as a goalkeeper. He played in one match for the Poland national team in 1934.
