= Piotr Danielak =

Polish footballer

Personal information
- Date of birth: 15 October 1913
- Place of birth: Giżyce, German Empire
- Date of death: 19 July 1969 (aged 55)
- Place of death: Poznań, Poland
- Height: 1.73 m (5 ft 8 in)
- Position: Midfielder

Senior career*
Years	Team	Apps	(Gls)
- San Poznań
1932–1939	Warta Poznań		
1945–1948	Warta Poznań		

International career
1938	Poland	1	(0)
- * Club domestic league appearances and goals

Piotr Danielak (15 October 1913 – 19 July 1969) was a Polish footballer who played as a midfielder.

He made one appearance for the Poland national team, in a 1–2 loss to Latvia on 25 September 1938.

== Honours ==
Warta Poznań

- Ekstraklasa: 1947
