= Krzysztof Rześny =

Polish footballer (born 1946)

Personal information
- Date of birth: 2 August 1946 (age 80)
- Place of birth: Łuków, Poland
- Position: Defender

Youth career
- Orlęta Łuków
- Sparta Gryfino
- 1961–1963: Chrobry Szczecin

Senior career*
Years	Team	Apps	(Gls)
–1961	Polonia Gryfino		
1963–1964	Pogoń Szczecin		
1964–1970	Motor Lublin		
1970–1978	Stal Mielec		

International career
1973–1976	Poland	6	(0)
- * Club domestic league appearances and goals

Krzysztof Rześny (born 2 August 1946) is a Polish former footballer who played as a defender. He played in six matches for the Poland national team from 1973 to 1976.

== Honours ==
Stal Mielec

- Ekstraklasa: 1972–73, 1975–76
