= Edward Załężny =

Polish footballer

Personal information
- Date of birth: 20 December 1957 (age 68)
- Place of birth: Kluczbork, Poland
- Height: 1.83 m (6 ft 0 in)
- Position: Defender

Senior career*
Years	Team	Apps	(Gls)
1969–1976	KKS Kluczbork		
1976–1979	Stal Mielec	82	(0)
1979–1984	Legia Warsaw	119	(2)
1985–1988	SAC Wisła Chicago		

International career
1980	Poland	4	(0)
- * Club domestic league appearances and goals

Edward Załężny (born 20 December 1957) is a Polish former professional footballer who played as a defender.

He earned four caps for the Poland national team in 1980.

== Honours ==
Legia Warsaw

- Polish Cup: 1979–80, 1980–81
