= Waldemar Folbrycht =

Polish footballer

Personal information
- Full name: Waldemar Leon Folbrycht
- Date of birth: 19 April 1942 (age 84)
- Place of birth: Poznań, Poland
- Height: 1.77 m (5 ft 10 in)
- Position: Defender

Youth career
- –1959: Świt Skolwin

Senior career*
Years	Team	Apps	(Gls)
1959–1963	Pogoń Szczecin		
1963–1965	Zawisza Bydgoszcz		
1965–1973	Pogoń Szczecin		

International career
1968	Poland	1	(0)
- * Club domestic league appearances and goals

Waldemar Folbrycht (born 19 April 1942) is a Polish former footballer who played as a defender.

He made one appearance for the Poland national team, in a 8–0 win over Turkey on 24 April 1968.
