= Edward Konietzny =

Polish footballer

Personal information
- Date of birth: 2 May 1904
- Place of birth: Katowice, German Empire
- Date of death: 2 July 1981 (aged 77)
- Place of death: Murrhardt, West Germany
- Height: 1.68 m (5 ft 6 in)
- Position: Forward

Senior career*
Years	Team	Apps	(Gls)
1922–1935	Pogoń Katowice		
1935	1. FC Katowice		

International career
1927	Poland	1	(0)
- * Club domestic league appearances and goals

Edward Konietzny (2 May 1904 – 2 July 1981) was a Polish footballer who played as a forward.

He earned one cap for the Poland national team in 1927.
