= Andrzej Jaskot =

Polish footballer (born 1971)

Personal information
- Date of birth: 26 January 1971 (age 55)
- Place of birth: Mielec, Poland
- Height: 1.87 m (6 ft 2 in)
- Position: Defender

Senior career*
Years	Team	Apps	(Gls)
1990–1993	Stal Mielec	52	(8)
1994	Olimpia Poznań		
1995–1996	Widzew Łódź	7	(0)
1995–1996	→ Hutnik Kraków (loan)	28	(3)
1996–1997	Zagłębie Lubin	12	(2)
1997–1999	Aluminium Konin		
1999	Ceramika Opoczno		
2000	Odra Opole		
2000	Dyskobolia	4	(0)
2001	Aluminium Konin		
2002	LKS Gomunice		
2002–2004	Stal Mielec		
2004	Perth Amboy ZPA		
2005	Stal Mielec		
2005–2006	Narew Ostrołęka		
2006	Kania Gostyń		
2007	SC Vistula Garfield		
2010	Wisłok Wiśniowa		
2012	Kolorado Wola Chorzelowska		
2014–2017	Kolorado Wola Chorzelowska		
2020–2021	Kolorado Wola Chorzelowska	2	(0)

International career
1998	Poland	1	(0)

Managerial career
- 2008: Stal Mielec
- 2008–2009: Orzeł Przeworsk
- 2009–2010: Wisłok Wiśniowa
- 2010–2011: Kolbuszowianka Kolbuszowa
- * Club domestic league appearances and goals

Andrzej Jaskot (born 26 January 1971) is a Polish former professional footballer who played as a defender. Jaskot played several seasons in the Polish Ekstraklasa with Stal Mielec, Hutnik Kraków and Widzew Łódź. He also made one appearance for the Poland national team against Ukraine in 1998.

== Honours ==
Widzew Łódź

- Polish Super Cup: 1996

Kolorado Wola Chorzelowska

- Klasa A Rzeszów III: 2016–17
