= Kasia Domanska =

Polish painter

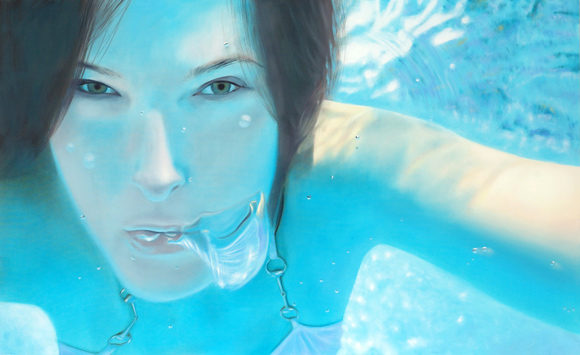
Oxygen, oil on linen, 97 × 162 cm by Kasia Domanska.

Kasia Domanska (born 15 February 1972 in Warsaw, Poland) is a Polish painter.

She studied in the Faculty of Painting of the Academy of Fine Arts in Warsaw, where she graduated in 1995. She has participated in numerous individual and group exhibitions.

Domanska’ paintings have been the subject of numerous solo and group exhibitions including the National Museum in Warsaw, she was selected for acceptance into the Biennales in Florence, The National Festival "The Supermarket of Art" two times and she has been a finalist the Art & Business competition "Painting of the Year" two times. Her work has been published in many media publications such as ELLE, Artinfo, Sztuka, Warsaw Business Journal, Rzeczpospolita, Twoj Styl Magazine, Wp.pl, Wprost and were featured in the major television news programs.

She has developed her own recognizable style. In her paintings, reality is difficult to separate from fiction. Hyperrealistic literality of details is not only a stylistic effort, but rather a manifestation of a certain perception of reality. Domanska's paintings relate to the reality of uncontrolled permeation of imitation and original. The literary meaning of seemingly banal and superficial beauty of reproduced objects and situations is also the background of symbolic celebration of emotions, feelings, reflections and affirmations of nature. Compositions from the “Pool” series make one's soul feel blissful. Fatigue disappears, thoughts begin to circulate lazily. By employing images of sunny beaches, bright blue sky, beach umbrellas, gentle waves, beautiful women in warm-hued bikinis and children playing in the sand, Ms Domanska presents a carefree, lazy summer, while at the same time challenging the definition of beauty with a carefully maintained distance.
