= Franciszek Giebartowski =

Polish footballer (1902–1968)

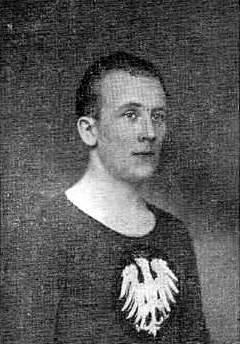

Personal information
- Date of birth: 18 June 1902
- Place of birth: Lwów, Poland
- Date of death: 4 September 1968 (aged 66)
- Place of death: Zakopane, Poland
- Height: 1.71 m (5 ft 7 in)
- Position: Defender

Senior career*
Years	Team	Apps	(Gls)
1917–1922	Pogoń Lwów		
1923–1924	Sparta Lwów		
1925–1927	Pogoń Lwów		
1931–1933	Oldboye Lwów		

International career
1926	Poland	3	(0)
- * Club domestic league appearances and goals

Franciszek Giebartowski (18 June 1902 – 4 September 1968) was a Polish footballer who played as a defender. He played in three matches for the Poland national football team in 1926.

== Honours ==
Pogoń Lwów

- Polish Football Championship: 1922, 1925, 1926
