= Filip Kmiciński =

Polish footballer

Personal information
- Date of birth: 21 October 1895
- Place of birth: Lwów, Austria-Hungary
- Date of death: 6 January 1976 (aged 80)
- Place of death: Warsaw, Poland
- Height: 1.74 m (5 ft 9 in)
- Position: Defender

Senior career*
Years	Team	Apps	(Gls)
1903–1910	Lechia Lwów		
1910–1928	Czarni Lwów		

International career
1925	Poland	1	(0)
- * Club domestic league appearances and goals

Filip Kmiciński (21 October 1895 – 6 January 1976) was a Polish football referee and player who played as a defender.

He played in one match for the Poland national team in 1925.
