= Stanisław Sobczyński =

Polish footballer

Personal information
- Date of birth: 2 April 1951 (age 75)
- Place of birth: Wadowice, Poland
- Height: 1.74 m (5 ft 9 in)
- Position: Defender

Senior career*
Years	Team	Apps	(Gls)
1965–1970	Skawa Wadowice		
1970–1977	ROW Rybnik		
1977–1982	Legia Warsaw		
1982–1984	KTP		
1985	ROW Rybnik		
1965–1973	Orły Chicago		
1965–1973	Wisła Chicago		
1965–1973	White Eagles Network Detroit		

International career
1974	Poland	6	(0)

Managerial career
- 2010: Skawa Wadowice
- * Club domestic league appearances and goals

Stanisław Sobczyński (born 2 April 1951) is a Polish former footballer who played as a defender.

He earned six caps for the Poland national team in 1974.
