= Jan Białas =

Polish footballer

Personal information
- Date of birth: 18 August 1952
- Place of birth: Siemianowice, Poland
- Date of death: 6 April 1975 (aged 22)
- Place of death: Bydgoszcz, Poland
- Position: Midfielder

Senior career*
Years	Team	Apps	(Gls)
- Siemianowiczanka
1970–1974	Szombierki Bytom		
1974–1975	GKS Tychy		

International career
- Poland U23
1974	Poland	1	(0)
- * Club domestic league appearances and goals

Jan Białas (18 August 1952 – 6 April 1975) was a Polish footballer who played as a midfielder.

He made his only appearance for the Poland national team in a 1–2 friendly loss to Haiti on 13 April 1974.

His brother Stefan was also a footballer.
