= Ludwik Szabakiewicz =

Polish footballer

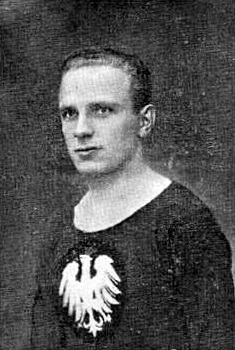

Personal information
- Date of birth: 24 June 1902
- Place of birth: Lwów, Poland
- Date of death: 31 July 1944 (aged 42)
- Height: 1.75 m (5 ft 9 in)
- Position: Forward

Senior career*
| Years | Team | Apps | (Gls) |
| 1920–1922 | Lechia Lwów | | |
| 1922–1931 | Pogoń Lwów | | |
| 1932–1934 | Oldboje Lwów | | |

International career
| 1925–1928 | Poland | 2 | (0) |
- * Club domestic league appearances and goals

Ludwik Szabakiewicz (24 June 1902 – 31 July 1944) was a Polish footballer who played as a forward. He played in two matches for the Poland national football team from 1925 to 1928. A prisoner of Majdanek and Auschwitz concentration camps, he died during transport to Natzweiler-Struthof concentration camp in 1944.

== Honours ==
Pogoń Lwów

- Polish Football Championship: 1923, 1925, 1926
