= Tomasz Lenart =

Polish footballer

Personal information
- Date of birth: 11 April 1969 (age 57)
- Place of birth: Łódź, Poland
- Height: 1.89 m (6 ft 2 in)
- Position: Defender

Senior career*
Years	Team	Apps	(Gls)
1989	ŁKS Łódź	0	(0)
1989–1990	Pilica Tomaszów Mazowiecki		
1990–2000	ŁKS Łódź	266	(9)
2000–2002	Stomil Olsztyn	52	(2)
2002–2003	Piotrcovia Piotrków Trybunalski	21	(0)
2003–2004	Stasiak Opoczno	16	(0)

International career
1995–1996	Poland	2	(0)
- * Club domestic league appearances and goals

Tomasz Lenart (born 11 April 1969) is a Polish former professional footballer who played as a defender. Lenart made two appearances for the Poland national team.

== Honours ==
ŁKS Łódź

- Ekstraklasa: 1997–98
