= Witold Kasperski =

Polish footballer (born 1949)

Personal information
- Date of birth: 26 October 1949 (age 77)
- Place of birth: Wałbrzych, Poland
- Height: 1.75 m (5 ft 9 in)
- Position: Midfielder

Senior career*
Years	Team	Apps	(Gls)
1963–1969	Star Starachowice		
1969–1971	Cracovia		
1971–1973	Star Starachowice		
1973–1979	Zagłębie Sosnowiec		
1979–1981	AS Angoulême		
- Stade Le Bon
1981–1983	La Louviére		

International career
1974	Poland	1	(0)
- * Club domestic league appearances and goals

Witold Kasperski (born 26 October 1949) is a Polish former professional footballer who played as a midfielder.

He made one appearance for the Poland national team in 1974. Kasperski joined French club AS Angoulême in 1979.
