= Henryk Pietrek =

Polish footballer

Personal information
- Date of birth: 15 April 1942 (age 84)
- Place of birth: Chorzów, Poland
- Height: 1.77 m (5 ft 10 in)
- Position: Goalkeeper

Youth career
- Konstal Chorzów

Senior career*
Years	Team	Apps	(Gls)
–1961	AKS Chorzów		
1961–1971	Ruch Chorzów		
1971	Hutnik Kraków		

International career
1963	Poland	1	(0)
- * Club domestic league appearances and goals

Henryk Pietrek (born 15 April 1942) is a Polish former footballer who played as a goalkeeper.

He made one appearance for the Poland national team in 1963.

== Honours ==
Ruch Chorzów

- Ekstraklasa: 1967–68
