= Artur Marczewski =

Polish footballer (1896–1945)

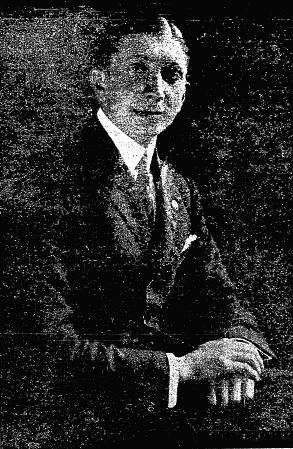

Personal information
- Date of birth: 3 August 1896
- Place of birth: Łódź, Poland
- Date of death: 1945 (aged 48–49)
- Height: 1.82 m (6 ft 0 in)
- Position: Left-back

Senior career*
Years	Team	Apps	(Gls)
1908–1910	Siła Łódź		
1910–1912	ŁTS-G Łódź		
1912–1919	Sturm Łódź		
1919–1922	Polonia Warsaw		
1926–1927	Klub Turystów Łódź		

International career
1921	Poland	1	(0)
- * Club domestic league appearances and goals

Artur Marczewski (3 August 1896 – 1945) was a Polish footballer who played as a left-back. He played in one match for the Poland national football team in 1921. He disappeared during the Second World War as Soviet forces advanced through Poland.
