= Krzysztof Urbanowicz =

Polish footballer (1958–2014)

Personal information
- Date of birth: 30 November 1958
- Place of birth: Kamień Pomorski, Poland
- Date of death: 25 November 2014 (aged 55)
- Height: 1.78 m (5 ft 10 in)
- Position: Defender

Senior career*
| Years | Team | Apps | (Gls) |
| 1977–1980 | Pogoń Szczecin | | |
| 1981–1982 | Zawisza Bydgoszcz | | |
| 1982–1988 | Pogoń Szczecin | 159 | (19) |

International career
| 1983–1984 | Poland | 4 | (0) |
- * Club domestic league appearances and goals

Krzysztof Urbanowicz (30 November 1958 – 25 November 2014) was a Polish footballer who played as a defender.

He made four appearances for the Poland national team from 1983 to 1984.
