= Tadeusz Jakubczyk =

Polish footballer

Personal information
- Date of birth: 25 September 1954 (age 72)
- Place of birth: Rogów, Poland
- Height: 1.80 m (5 ft 11 in)
- Position: Defender

Senior career*
Years	Team	Apps	(Gls)
- ROW Rybnik
1977–1984	Ruch Chorzów		

International career
1977	Poland	1	(0)
- * Club domestic league appearances and goals

Tadeusz Jakubczyk (born 25 September 1954) is a Polish former footballer who played as a defender. He played in one match for the Poland national team in 1977.

== Honours ==
Ruch Chorzów

- Ekstraklasa: 1978–79
