= Antoni Piasecki =

Polish footballer

Personal information
- Date of birth: 12 December 1913
- Place of birth: Łódź, Russian Empire
- Height: 1.78 m (5 ft 10 in)
- Position: Goalkeeper

Senior career*
Years	Team	Apps	(Gls)
–1931	Zjednoczeni Łódź		
1932–1935	ŁKS Łódź		
1936	Gedania Danzig		

International career
1935	Poland	1	(0)
- * Club domestic league appearances and goals

Antoni Piasecki (12 December 1913, date of death unknown) was a Polish footballer who played as a goalkeeper. It is believed he was killed in 1931 or 1932 in Kutno.

He played in one match for the Poland national football team in 1935.
