= Jan Sobol (footballer) =

Polish footballer

Personal information
- Date of birth: 21 June 1953 (age 73)
- Place of birth: Boyevychi, Ukraine
- Height: 1.83 m (6 ft 0 in)
- Position: Midfielder

Senior career*
Years	Team	Apps	(Gls)
1972–	Zagłębie Wałbrzych		
1977–1982	ŁKS Łódź		

International career
1977–1979	Poland	2	(0)
- * Club domestic league appearances and goals

Jan Sobol (born 21 June 1953) is a Polish former footballer who played as a midfielder. He played in two matches for the Poland national football team from 1977 to 1979.
