= Antoni Keller =

Polish footballer

Personal information
- Full name: Antoni Felicjan Keller
- Date of birth: 7 June 1909
- Place of birth: Warsaw, Poland
- Date of death: 19 December 1996 (aged 87)
- Place of death: Cape Town, South Africa
- Height: 1.80 m (5 ft 11 in)
- Position: Goalkeeper

Youth career
- 1924–1926: Varsovia

Senior career*
Years	Team	Apps	(Gls)
1926–1928	Polonia Warsaw		
1928	TKS Toruń		
1929–1930	Polonia Warsaw		
1931–1932	KS Warszawianka		
1933–1936	Legia Warsaw		
1937	Gedania Gdańsk		
- Dundee United
- Polonia Cape Town

International career
1934–1935	Poland	2	(0)

Managerial career
- Polonia Cape Town
- * Club domestic league appearances and goals

Antoni Felicjan Keller (7 June 1909 – 19 December 1996) was a Polish footballer who played as a goalkeeper. He played in two matches for the Poland national football team from 1934 to 1935.

During World War II, he fought and was injured in the September campaign, and was evacuated to Romania afterwards. He then travelled through France, Spain, Portugal, England and Scotland, before reaching Africa, where he joined the Lieutenant-General Bernard Montgomery's forces during the North African campaign.
