= Stefan Sumara =

Polish footballer

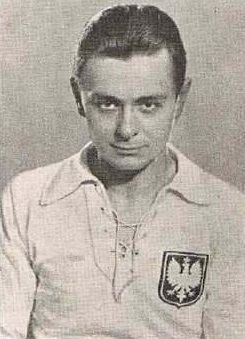

Personal information
- Full name: Stefan Tadeusz Sumara
- Date of birth: 13 December 1914
- Place of birth: Łopatyn, Russian Empire
- Date of death: 28 August 1951 (aged 36)
- Place of death: Mokre, Poland
- Height: 1.71 m (5 ft 7 in)
- Position: Midfielder

Senior career*
Years	Team	Apps	(Gls)
- Pogoń Lwów

International career
1938	Poland	1	(0)
- * Club domestic league appearances and goals

Stefan Tadeusz Sumara (13 December 1914 – 28 August 1951) was a Polish footballer who played as midfielder. He played in one match for the Poland national football team in 1938.
