= Waldemar Waleszczyk =

Polish footballer

Personal information
- Date of birth: 1 May 1958 (age 68)
- Place of birth: Somsiory, Poland
- Height: 1.86 m (6 ft 1 in)
- Position: Defender

Senior career*
Years	Team	Apps	(Gls)
1984–1991	Ruch Chorzów	148	(1)
1992–1993	Rot-Weiß Lüdenscheid		
1994–1995	Concordia Knurów		

International career
1985	Poland	1	(0)

Managerial career
- 1995–1996: Concordia Knurów
- 1996–1999: Gwarek Ornotowice
- * Club domestic league appearances and goals

Waldemar Waleszczyk (born 1 May 1958) is a Polish former football manager and player. He played in one match for the Poland national team in 1985.

== Honours ==
Ruch Chorzów

- Ekstraklasa: 1988–89
