= Jan Kłaczek =

Polish footballer

Personal information
- Date of birth: 25 December 1928
- Place of birth: Hajduki, German Empire
- Date of death: 28 January 2005 (aged 76)
- Place of death: Rybnik, Poland
- Position: Goalkeeper

Senior career*
Years	Team	Apps	(Gls)
1942–1944	Bismarckhütter SV		
1945–1946	Batory Chorzów		
1946–1947	Ruch Chorzów		
1947–1950	Naprzód Lipiny		
1950	Lotnik Warsaw		
1951–1952	CWKS Warsaw		
1953–1957	ŁKS Łódź		
1958–1959	Stal Rzeszów		
1959–1963	Górnik Radlin		

International career
1953	Poland	1	(0)
- * Club domestic league appearances and goals

Jan Kłaczek (25 December 1928 – 28 January 2005) was a Polish footballer who played as a goalkeeper.

He made one appearance for the Poland national team in 1953.
