= Piotr Brol =

Polish footballer (1944–2001)

Personal information
- Full name: Piotr Paweł Brol
- Date of birth: 26 April 1944
- Place of birth: Nakło Śląskie, Poland
- Date of death: 26 June 2001 (aged 57)
- Place of death: Lahnstein, Germany
- Position: Goalkeeper

Senior career*
Years	Team	Apps	(Gls)
1956–1961	Orzeł Nakło		
1962–1963	Polonia Bytom		
1963–1965	Śląsk Wrocław		
1965–1973	Polonia Bytom		

International career
1967–1969	Poland	2	(0)
- * Club domestic league appearances and goals

Piotr Brol (26 April 1944 – 26 June 2001) was a Polish footballer who played as a goalkeeper.

He made two appearances for the Poland national team from 1967 to 1969.

== Honours ==
Polonia Bytom

- Ekstraklasa: 1962

Śląsk Wrocław

- II liga: 1963–64
