= Józef Żiżka =

Polish footballer

Personal information
- Date of birth: 11 March 1913
- Place of birth: Kraków, Austria-Hungary
- Date of death: 28 October 1975 (aged 62)
- Place of death: Zakopane, Poland
- Height: 1.78 m (5 ft 10 in)
- Position: Midfielder

Senior career*
Years	Team	Apps	(Gls)
1928–1932	Olsza Kraków		
1933–1938	Cracovia		
1938–1939	TS Mościce		
1946–1948	Polonia Świdnica		
1950–1952	Gwardia Zakopane		

International career
1934–1936	Poland	2	(0)
- * Club domestic league appearances and goals

Józef Żiżka (11 March 1913 – 28 October 1975) was a Polish footballer.

He earned two caps for the Poland national team from 1934 to 1936.

== Honours ==
Cracovia

- Ekstraklasa: 1937
