= Marian Nowara =

Polish footballer

Personal information
- Date of birth: 6 December 1935 (age 90)
- Place of birth: Bytom, Poland
- Height: 1.65 m (5 ft 5 in)
- Position: Forward

Senior career*
Years	Team	Apps	(Gls)
1948–1955	Polonia Bytom		
1956–1961	Legia Warsaw		
1962–1965	Lublinianka		
1965–1968	Okęcie Warsaw		

International career
1958	Poland	2	(0)
- * Club domestic league appearances and goals

Marian Nowara (born 6 December 1935) is a Polish former footballer who played as a forward.

He made two appearances for the Poland national team in 1958.

== Honours ==
Legia Warsaw

- Ekstraklasa: 1956
