= Franciszek Wilczkiewicz =

Polish footballer

Personal information
- Full name: Franciszek Eugeniusz Wilczkiewicz
- Date of birth: 10 October 1906
- Place of birth: Wieliczka, Austria-Hungary
- Date of death: 10 August 1968 (aged 61)
- Place of death: Lubliniec, Poland
- Position: Midfielder

Senior career*
Years	Team	Apps	(Gls)
- Sparta Kraków
1925–1939	Garbarnia Kraków		

International career
1931–1932	Poland	2	(0)

Managerial career
- Garbarnia Kraków
- * Club domestic league appearances and goals

Franciszek Eugeniusz Wilczkiewicz (10 October 1906 – 10 August 1968) was a Polish footballer who played as a midfielder.

He appeared in two matches for the Poland national team from 1931 to 1932.

== Honours ==
Garbarnia Kraków

- Ekstraklasa: 1931
