= Krystian Walot =

Polish footballer

Personal information
- Date of birth: 5 May 1956 (age 70)
- Place of birth: Bytom, Poland
- Height: 1.79 m (5 ft 10 in)
- Position: Defender

Senior career*
Years	Team	Apps	(Gls)
- Szombierki Bytom
–1977	Górnik Wojkowice		
1977–1987	Ruch Chorzów		
- Westfalia Herne

International career
1981	Poland	1	(0)
- * Club domestic league appearances and goals

Krystian Walot (born 5 May 1956) is a Polish former footballer who played as a defender. He played in one match for the Poland national team in 1981.

== Honours ==
Ruch Chorzów

- Ekstraklasa: 1978–79
