= Klaus Jerominek =

Polish footballer (1931–2018)

Personal information
- Date of birth: 20 May 1931
- Place of birth: Bytom, Poland
- Date of death: 20 November 2018 (aged 87)
- Place of death: Erlangen, Germany
- Height: 1.67 m (5 ft 6 in)
- Position: Forward

Senior career*
Years	Team	Apps	(Gls)
1946–1948	GKS Rozbark		
1949	Górnik Wałbrzych		
1949–1950	Szombierki Bytom		
1951–1952	Polonia Bytom		
1953–1954	Legia Warsaw		
1954	Zawisza Bydgoszcz		
1954–1955	Polonia Bytom		
1956–1964	Arkonia Szczecin		

International career
1952	Poland	1	(0)
- * Club domestic league appearances and goals

Klaus Jerominek (20 May 1931 – 20 November 2018) was a Polish footballer who played as a forward.

He played in one match for the Poland national football team in 1952.
