= Kazimierz Polok =

Polish footballer

Personal information
- Date of birth: 11 February 1937
- Place of birth: Chorzów, Poland
- Date of death: 5 May 1993 (aged 56)
- Height: 1.58 m (5 ft 2 in)
- Position: Winger

Senior career*
Years	Team	Apps	(Gls)
–1957	Ruch Chorzów		
1958–1959	Śląsk Wrocław		
1959–1965	Ruch Chorzów		
1966–1967	Wyzwolenie Chorzów		

International career
1961–1963	Poland	5	(0)
- * Club domestic league appearances and goals

Kazimierz Polok (11 February 1937 – 5 May 1993) was a Polish footballer who played as a winger.

He earned five caps for the Poland national team from 1961 to 1963.

== Honours ==
Ruch Chorzów

- Ekstraklasa: 1960
