= Klaus Masseli =

Polish footballer

Personal information
- Date of birth: 17 July 1941 (age 85)
- Place of birth: Ruda Śląska, Poland
- Height: 1.76 m (5 ft 9 in)
- Position: Goalkeeper

Senior career*
Years	Team	Apps	(Gls)
- Pogoń Nowy Bytom
–1961	Julia Szklarska Poręba		
1961–1962	BKS Bolesławiec		
1962–1969	Śląsk Wrocław		
1969–1972	Szombierki Bytom		
1972–1975	Odra Wrocław		

International career
1966	Poland	1	(0)
- * Club domestic league appearances and goals

Klaus Masseli (born 17 July 1941) is a Polish former footballer who played as a goalkeeper. He played in one match for the Poland national football team in 1966.
