= Mieczysław Czajkowski =

Polish footballer

Personal information
- Date of birth: 4 September 1898
- Place of birth: Łódź, Russian Empire
- Date of death: 8 September 1972 (aged 74)
- Place of death: Góra Kalwaria, Poland
- Height: 1.80 m (5 ft 11 in)
- Position: Defender

Senior career*
| Years | Team | Apps | (Gls) |
| 1920–1921 | 1pp Legionów Vilnius | | |
| 1921–1922 | Korona Warsaw | | |
| 1922–1927 | Polonia Warsaw | | |
| 1927–1929 | 1pp Legionów Vilnius | | |

International career
| 1925 | Poland | 2 | (0) |
- * Club domestic league appearances and goals

Mieczysław Czajkowski (4 September 1898 – 8 September 1972) was a Polish footballer who played as a defender.

He played in two matches for the Poland national football team in 1925.
