= Grzegorz Stencel =

Polish footballer

Personal information
- Date of birth: 25 January 1962 (age 64)
- Place of birth: Sochaczew, Poland
- Height: 1.87 m (6 ft 2 in)
- Position: Goalkeeper

Youth career
- Bzura Chodaków

Senior career*
Years	Team	Apps	(Gls)
1979–1980	Unia Skierniewice		
1982–1984	ŁKS Łódź	0	(0)
1983	→ Orzeł Łódź (loan)		
1984–1989	Bałtyk Gdynia		
1989–1992	Olimpia Poznań	82	(0)
1994–1996	Hutnik Warsaw		
1996	Pelikan Łowicz		
1997	Hutnik Warsaw		
1997	Bzura Chodaków		

International career
1988	Poland	1	(0)
- * Club domestic league appearances and goals

Grzegorz Stencel (born 25 January 1962) is a Polish former professional footballer who played as a goalkeeper.

He played in one match for the Poland national football team in 1988.
