= Teodor Wieliszek =

Polish footballer

Personal information
- Date of birth: 2 November 1898
- Place of birth: Łódź, Russian Empire
- Date of death: 26 August 1952 (aged 53)
- Place of death: Falkensee, East Germany
- Position: Midfielder

Senior career*
Years	Team	Apps	(Gls)
1918	ŁTS Łódź		
1919	Polonia Łódź		
1919–1924	ŁTS-G Łódź		
1925–1932	Klub Turystów Łódź		
1932–1936	Union-Touring Łódź		

International career
1926	Poland	1	(0)
- * Club domestic league appearances and goals

Teodor Wieliszek (2 November 1898 – 26 August 1952) was a Polish footballer who played as a midfielder.

He made one appearance for the Poland national team in 1926.
