= Jan Luxenburg =

Polish footballer

Personal information
- Full name: Jan Andrzej Luxenburg
- Date of birth: 12 February 1905
- Place of birth: Warsaw, Poland
- Date of death: 30 March 1974 (aged 69)
- Place of death: Gdynia, Poland
- Height: 1.76 m (5 ft 9 in)
- Position: Forward

Senior career*
Years	Team	Apps	(Gls)
1916–1917	Slavia Warsaw		
1917–1921	Polonia Warsaw		
1921–1931	Warszawianka	69	(19)

International career
1928	Poland	1	(0)
- * Club domestic league appearances and goals

Jan Andrzej Luxenburg (12 February 1905 – 30 March 1974) was a Polish footballer who played as a forward. He earned one cap for the Poland national team in 1928.
