= Piotr Suski =

Polish footballer

Personal information
- Date of birth: 29 June 1942
- Place of birth: Łódź, Poland
- Date of death: 31 January 2009 (aged 66)
- Place of death: Łódź, Poland
- Height: 1.75 m (5 ft 9 in)
- Position: Midfielder

Youth career
- 1955–1959: ŁKS Łódź

Senior career*
Years	Team	Apps	(Gls)
1959–1972	ŁKS Łódź		
1972	Waterford		
1978	Oulun Työväen Palloilijat		

International career
1961–1967	Poland	19	(0)
- * Club domestic league appearances and goals

Piotr Suski (29 June 1942 – 31 January 2009) was a Polish footballer who played as a midfielder.

== Career ==
Suski started his senior career with ŁKS Łódź in the Polish Ekstraklasa, where he made over 200 appearances and scored 15 league goals. After that, he played for Waterford and Oulun Työväen Palloilijat.
