= Konrad Gołoś =

Polish footballer (born 1982)

Personal information
- Full name: Konrad Gołoś
- Date of birth: 15 September 1982 (age 44)
- Place of birth: Siedlce, Poland
- Height: 1.86 m (6 ft 1 in)
- Position: Midfielder

Youth career
- 1993–1996: Zryw Chodów
- 1996–2000: Pogoń Siedlce

Senior career*
Years	Team	Apps	(Gls)
2000–2003	Pogoń Siedlce		
2003–2004	Radomiak Radom	29	(2)
2004–2005	Polonia Warsaw	24	(1)
2005–2010	Wisła Kraków	34	(1)
2006	→ Polonia Warsaw (loan)	13	(1)
2007–2008	→ Górnik Zabrze (loan)	24	(1)
2013–2014	Orzeł Piaski Wielkie		
2016	Amator Golce		
2016	Wisła Rząska		
2017–2018	Tempo Rzeszotary	18	(12)

International career
2004	Poland B	1	(0)
2005–2008	Poland	3	(0)
- * Club domestic league appearances and goals

Konrad Gołoś (born 15 September 1982) is a Polish former professional footballer who played as a midfielder.

== Career ==
The first club in Gołoś' senior career was Pogoń Siedlce. He played as a midfielder who made his Ekstraklasa debut for Polonia Warsaw on 7 August 2004, and joined Wisła Kraków ahead of the 2005–06 season. Gołoś had previously played for the second-tier team Radomiak Radom.

On 28 April 2005, he played his first international match for Poland in a draw against Mexico.

== Career statistics ==
Appearances and goals by club, season and competition
Club	Season	League			National cup		Europe		Play-offs		Total	
Club	Season	Division	Apps	Goals	Apps	Goals	Apps	Goals	Apps	Goals	Apps	Goals
Radomiak Radom	2003–04	II liga	29	2	2	1	—		2	0	33	3
Polonia Warsaw	2004–05	Ekstraklasa	24	1	5	0	—		—		29	1
Wisła Kraków	2005–06	Ekstraklasa	18	1	4	0	1 (Note: Appearance in UEFA Cup)	0	—		23	1
Wisła Kraków	2006–07	Ekstraklasa	16	0	7	0	—		—		23	0
Wisła Kraków	2008–09	Ekstraklasa	0	0	0	0	0	0	—		0	0
Wisła Kraków	2009–10	Ekstraklasa	0	0	0	0	0	0	—		0	0
Wisła Kraków	Total		34	1	11	0	1	0	—		46	1
Polonia Warsaw (loan)	2006–07	II liga	13	1	1	0	—		—		14	1
Górnik Zabrze (loan)	2007–08	Ekstraklasa	24	1	4 (Note: One appearance in Polish Cup, three appearances in Ekstraklasa Cup)	0	—		—		28	1
Career total			124	6	23	1	1	0	2	0	150	7
