= Tadeusz Błachno =

Polish footballer (born 1953)

Personal information
- Date of birth: 11 March 1953 (age 73)
- Place of birth: Skała, Poland
- Height: 1.72 m (5 ft 8 in)
- Position: Forward

Senior career*
Years	Team	Apps	(Gls)
–1970	Skalanka Skała		
1970–1971	Krakus Nowa Huta		
1971–1972	Hutnik Kraków		
1972–1973	Legia Warsaw	1	(0)
1973–1974	Widzew Łódź		
1974–1975	Hutnik Kraków		
1975–1980	Widzew Łódź		
1980–1983	Cracovia	19+	(5+)
1983–1984	K.S.K. Heist		

International career
1978	Poland	2	(0)
- * Club domestic league appearances and goals

Tadeusz Błachno (born 11 March 1953) is a Polish former footballer who played as a forward.
