= Henryk Skromny =

Polish footballer

Personal information
- Date of birth: 24 December 1926
- Place of birth: Poznań, German Empire
- Date of death: 16 November 1962 (aged 35)
- Place of death: Bytom, Poland
- Height: 1.82 m (6 ft 0 in)
- Position: Goalkeeper

Senior career*
Years	Team	Apps	(Gls)
1945–1946	Lech Poznań		
1946–1950	Legia Warsaw		
1951–1956	Polonia Bytom		
1957	Lech Poznań		
1958–1959	Polonia Bytom		

International career
1947–1952	Poland	7	(0)

Managerial career
- 1959–1960: Piast Gliwice
- 1961: Stal Mielec
- 1962: Piast Gliwice
- * Club domestic league appearances and goals

Henryk Skromny (24 December 1926 – 16 November 1962) was a Polish footballer who played as a goalkeeper.

He played in seven matches for the Poland national team from 1947 to 1952.

== Honours ==
Polonia Bytom

- Ekstraklasa: 1954
