= Jan Rudnow =

Polish footballer

Personal information
- Date of birth: 2 April 1947 (age 79)
- Place of birth: Katowice, Poland
- Height: 1.72 m (5 ft 8 in)
- Position: Defender

Youth career
- Lechia 06 Mysłowice

Senior career*
Years	Team	Apps	(Gls)
1965–1972	Ruch Chorzów		
1972–1975	BKS Stal Bielsko-Biała		
1975–1976	Ruch Chorzów		
- Siemianowiczanka Siemianowice

International career
1968	Poland	1	(0)

Managerial career
- 1991: Zawisza Bydgoszcz
- 1992: GKS Jastrzębie
- 2000: Ruch Chorzów
- * Club domestic league appearances and goals

Jan Rudnow (born 2 April 1947) is a Polish former football manager and player who played as a defender.

He earned one cap for the Poland national team in 1968.

== Honours ==
Ruch Chorzów

- Ekstraklasa: 1967–68
