= Jan Lesiak =

Polish footballer

Personal information
- Date of birth: 1 April 1913
- Place of birth: Kraków, Austria-Hungary
- Date of death: 31 March 1946 (aged 32)
- Place of death: Sława, Poland
- Height: 1.70 m (5 ft 7 in)
- Position: Midfielder

Senior career*
Years	Team	Apps	(Gls)
1932–1946	Garbarnia Kraków		

International career
1936	Poland	1	(0)
- * Club domestic league appearances and goals

Jan Lesiak (1 April 1913 – 31 March 1946) was a Polish footballer who played as a midfielder.

He played in one match for the Poland national team in 1936.
