= Joachim Pierzyna =

Polish footballer

Personal information
- Date of birth: 20 August 1939 (age 87)
- Place of birth: Sieraków, Poland
- Position: Defender

Senior career*
Years	Team	Apps	(Gls)
- LZS Sieraków Śląski
1957–1959	Sparta Lubliniec		
1960–1965	Polonia Bytom		
1967–1978	St. Louis Stars		
1968	Dallas Tornado		
1969–1974	St. Louis Stars		

International career
1962	Poland	1	(0)
- * Club domestic league appearances and goals

Joachim Pierzyna (born 20 August 1939) is a Polish former footballer who played as a defender.

He earned one cap for the Poland national team in 1962.

== Honours ==
Polonia Bytom

- Ekstraklasa: 1962
