= Stefan Fliegel =

Polish footballer

Personal information
- Full name: Stefan Józef Fliegel
- Date of birth: 6 June 1908
- Place of birth: Łódź, Poland
- Date of death: 31 October 1939 (aged 31)
- Place of death: Łódź, Poland
- Height: 1.74 m (5 ft 9 in)
- Position: Defender

Senior career*
| Years | Team | Apps | (Gls) |
| –1930 | Orkan Łódź | | |
| 1930–1931 | WKS Łódź | | |
| 1932 | Granat Skarżysko | | |
| 1933–1939 | ŁKS Łódź | | |

International career
| 1935 | Poland | 1 | (0) |
- * Club domestic league appearances and goals

Stefan Józef Fliegel (6 June 1908 – 31 October 1939) was a Polish footballer who played as a defender. He played in one match for the Poland national football team in 1935. He died in "mysterious circumstances" during World War II.
