= Zbigniew Myga =

Polish footballer

Personal information
- Date of birth: 12 November 1939 (age 86)
- Place of birth: Myszków, Poland
- Height: 1.64 m (5 ft 5 in)
- Positions: Midfielder; forward

Senior career*
Years	Team	Apps	(Gls)
–1957	MKS Myszków		
1958–1970	Zagłębie Sosnowiec	255	(46)
1971–1972	Górnik Kazimierz		
1972	Dunkerque		
1973	Cambrai		
1974–1975	Górnik Kazimierz		

International career
1966	Poland	1	(0)

Managerial career
- 1974–1975: Górnik Kazimierz (player-manager)
- Stal Stalowa Wola
- 1982–1984: Zagłębie Sosnowiec
- 1985–1988: Polonia Bytom
- 1990–1992: Zagłębie Sosnowiec
- 1992–1994: Krisbut Myszków
- 1996–1997: Polonia Bytom
- * Club domestic league appearances and goals

Zbigniew Myga (born 12 November 1939) is a Polish former football manager and player.

He earned one cap for the Poland national team in 1966.

== Honours ==
=== Player ===
Zagłębie Sosnowiec

- II liga South: 1959
- Polish Cup: 1961–62, 1962–63

=== Manager ===
Polonia Bytom

- II liga, group II: 1979–80

Krisbut Myszków

- III liga, group I: 1993–94
