= Robert Grzywocz =

Polish footballer (1932–2018)

Personal information
- Date of birth: 1 May 1932
- Place of birth: Świętochłowice, Poland
- Date of death: 24 August 2018 (aged 86)
- Place of death: Łódź, Poland
- Height: 1.69 m (5 ft 7 in)
- Position: Midfielder

Youth career
- 1945–1948: Kresy Chorzów
- 1948–1951: AKS/Budowlani Chorzów

Senior career*
Years	Team	Apps	(Gls)
1951–1952	Budowlani Chorzów	27	(0)
1952	GWKS Bielsko		
1953	Wawel Kraków	19	(0)
1953–1954	CWKS Warsaw	16	(0)
1955–1956	Wawel Kraków		
1957–1958	ŁKS Łódź	42	(3)

International career
1954	Poland	2	(0)

Managerial career
- ŁKS Łódź (youth)
- 1969: Widzew Łódź
- * Club domestic league appearances and goals

Robert Grzywocz (1 May 1932 – 24 August 2018) was a Polish football manager and player who played as a midfielder. He made two appearances for the Poland national team in 1954.

== Honours ==
ŁKS Łódź

- Polish Cup: 1956–57
