= Zdzisław Wesołowski =

Polish footballer

Personal information
- Date of birth: 23 March 1927
- Place of birth: Dęblin, Poland
- Date of death: 2 April 1983 (aged 56)
- Place of death: Starachowice, Poland
- Height: 1.68 m (5 ft 6 in)
- Position: Forward

Senior career*
Years	Team	Apps	(Gls)
- Polonia Warsaw

International career
1951	Poland	1	(0)
- * Club domestic league appearances and goals

Zdzisław Wesołowski (23 March 1927 – 2 April 1983) was a Polish footballer who played as a forward.

He made his sole appearance for the Poland national team in a 0–6 loss to Hungary on 27 May 1951.

== Honours ==
Polonia Warsaw

- Polish Cup: 1951–52
