= Lucjan Rudnicki (politician) =

Polish writer and politician

Member of the Sejm of the Polish People's Republic
- In office November 20, 1952 – November 20, 1956

Personal details
- Born: January 2, 1882 Sulejów, Congress Poland
- Died: June 8, 1968 (aged 86) Warsaw, Polish People's Republic
- Party: PZPR

Lucjan Rudnicki (January 2, 1882 in Sulejów, Congress Poland - June 8, 1968 in Warsaw, Polish People's Republic) was a Polish writer, member of the PPS, SDKPiL, and KPP, and a deputy of the 1st term of the Sejm of the Polish People's Republic. Usually wrote under the pen names of "Ludwik", "Mały", "Krawiec", and "Kazimierz Lubiński".

== Biography ==
He was the eldest of 9 children of Wojciech (1853–1899) and Klementyna née Okrasińska (1858–1939). After completing elementary school in Sulejów in 1895, he began working as a bricklayer and carpenter. In 1898, he moved to Łódź, where he worked in the Heinzl and Kunitzer factories there. From 1898 to 1906, he participated in illegal anti-Tsarist and revolutionary activities led by the Polish Socialist Party, for which he was imprisoned twice and exiled to the Arkhangelsk Governorate for 3 years. He escaped from there and lived under an assumed name.

In March 1905, he participated in the 7th Congress of the PPS. In 1907, he switched from PPS to SDKPiL. He was active in the Warsaw Committee of SDKPiL. During World War I, he opposed the Germans and was interned from 1916 to 1918 in Szczypiorno, Havelberg, and Modlin. From December 1918 to August 1938, he was a member of the Communist Party of Poland (KPP). In the first half of 1919, on behalf of KPRP, he belonged to the Warsaw Council of Workers' Delegates, for which he was imprisoned in Modlin. In the mid-1920s, he published articles critical of the activities of PPS and Polish People's Party "Wyzwolenie" in socialist papers. In 1933, he returned to Sulejów. In January 1942, he joined the PPR. He collaborated with the People's Guard (GL) and Union of Youth Struggle (ZWM). From January to May 1945, he was the mayor of Sulejów and the secretary of the PPR City Committee in that city.

After World War II, he mainly focused on literary work. In December 1948, he was a delegate to the 1st Congress of the PZPR, and in March 1954, to the 3rd Congress of the PZPR. In November 1949, he became a member of the Nationwide Committee for the Celebration of the 70th Birthday of Joseph Stalin. From 1952 to 1956, he served as a deputy of the 1st term of the Sejm of the Polish People's Republic. In 1957, he was a co-founder and member of the Board of the Association of Atheists and Freethinkers.

In 1951, he received the Silver Badge for Recipients of the 2nd Degree State Award.

He was buried in the Avenue of the Distinguished at the Powązki Military Cemetery in Warsaw (Section A28-Tuje-20).

== Private life ==
He was married to Maria Szukiewicz-Rudnicka, an activist in the socialist and communist movement, and a participant in the 1905 Revolution, and the assassination attempt on the Warsaw Governor-General Georgi Skalon, recognized as Righteous Among the Nations. They had three children: Kazimierz (1908–1924), Elżbieta (1910–1931), and Konrad (1926–2013), a professor at the Jagiellonian University, an astronomer, and a cleric of the Mariavite Church.

== Literary work ==
The literary output of Lucjan Rudnicki is not fully known because some unpublished works were destroyed in 1939.

- Published Odrodzenie (1920) at his own expense.
- A series of short stories titled Republika demokratyczna (1921).
- Memoirs titled Stare i nowe (Volume 1 – 1948, Volume 2 – 1950, Volume 3 – 1960).

== Orders and decorations ==
- Order of the Builders of People's Poland (1954)
- Commander's Cross of the Order of Polonia Restituta (February 26, 1952)
- Order of the Banner of Labour 1st Class (July 22, 1949)
- Medal for Long Marital Life (January 19, 1955)

== Modern-day legacy after the fall of the Polish People's Republic ==
The street in the Warsaw district of Bielany that bore the name of Lucjan Rudnicki was renamed in 2017 (to General Klemens Stanisław Rudnicki Street). Similarly, the name of the street in Sulejów was changed in 2018 from Lucjan Rudnicki to General Stefan Grot-Rowecki.

A primary school in Warsaw's Ursynów district was also named after Lucjan Rudnicki; since 2019, the school has been named after Julian Ursyn Niemcewicz. Until 1992, Lucjan Rudnicki was also the patron of Primary School No. 40 in Poznań

== Bibliography ==
- Krzysztof Woźniakowski, entry: "Rudnicki Lucjan (1882–1968)," [in:] Polish Biographical Dictionary vol. 32, Wrocław–Warsaw–Kraków 1989–1991, pp. 637–641.
