= Henryk Brejza =

Polish footballer (born 1938)

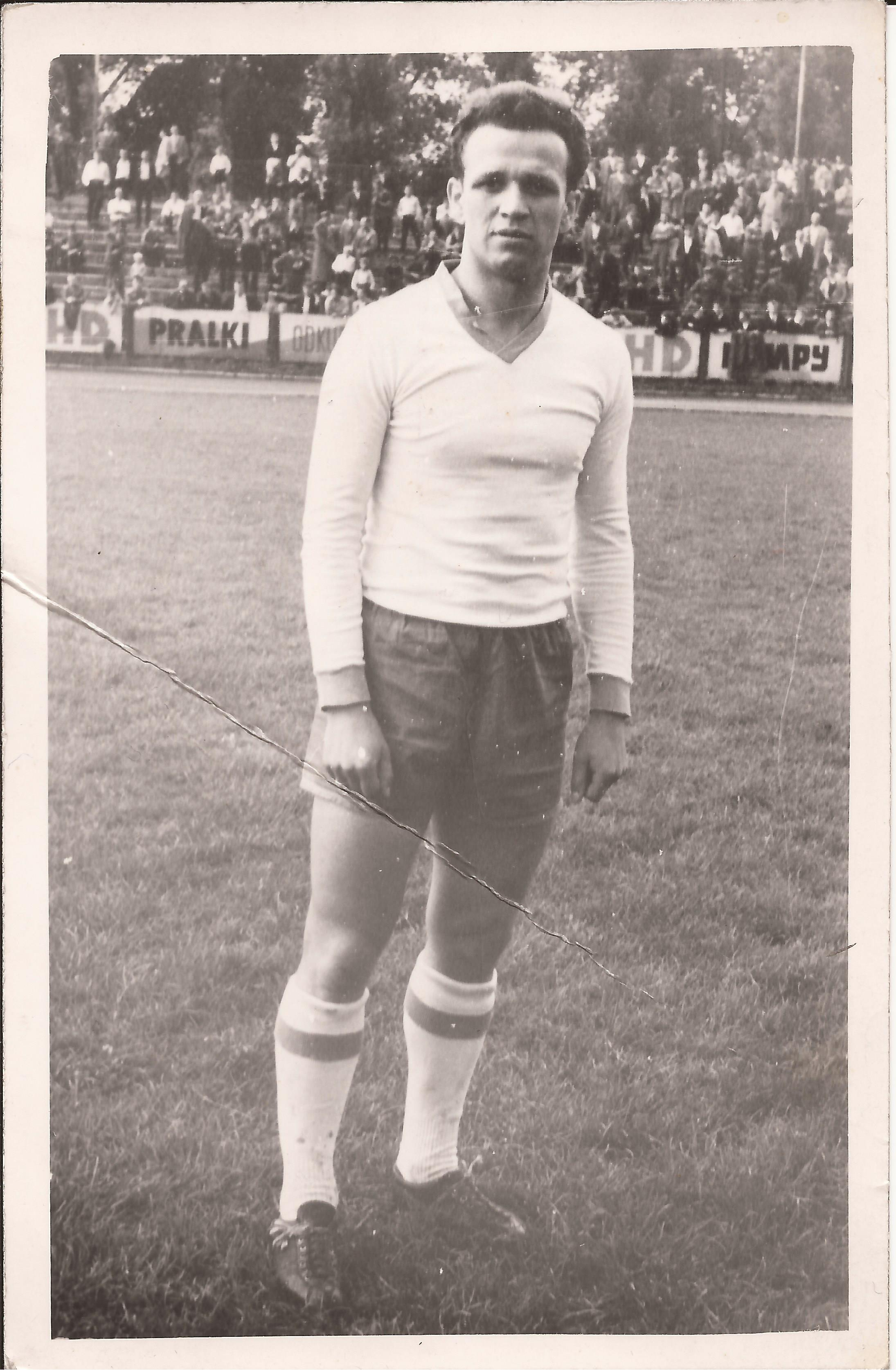

Personal information
- Date of birth: 20 August 1938 (age 88)
- Place of birth: Ozimek, Poland
- Position: Defender

Senior career*
Years	Team	Apps	(Gls)
–1957	Stal Ozimek		
1957–1971	Odra Opole		

International career
1966–1968	Poland	9	(0)
- * Club domestic league appearances and goals

Henryk Brejza (born 20 August 1938) is a Polish former footballer who played as a defender.

He earned nine caps for the Poland national team from 1966 to 1968.
