= Wiesław Pajor =

Polish footballer

Personal information
- Date of birth: 18 April 1932
- Place of birth: Kraków, Poland
- Date of death: 20 November 2008 (aged 76)
- Place of death: Kraków, Poland
- Height: 1.71 m (5 ft 7 in)
- Position: Goalkeeper

Senior career*
Years	Team	Apps	(Gls)
1945–1952	Cracovia		
1953	Wawel Kraków		
1954	Cracovia		
1955–1960	Wawel Kraków		

International career
1954	Poland	1	(0)
- * Club domestic league appearances and goals

Wiesław Pajor (18 April 1932 – 20 November 2008) was a Polish footballer who played as a goalkeeper.

He made one appearance for the Poland national team in 1954.
