= Henryk Rybicki =

Polish footballer

Personal information
- Date of birth: 5 July 1922
- Place of birth: Kraków, Poland
- Date of death: 26 December 1978 (aged 56)
- Place of death: Kraków, Poland
- Height: 1.68 m (5 ft 6 in)
- Position: Goalkeeper

Senior career*
Years	Team	Apps	(Gls)
1932–1933	Grzegórzecki Kraków		
1934–1939	Wisła Kraków		
1944–1950	Cracovia		
1951–1953	Garbarnia Kraków		
1953–1954	Czuwaj Przemyśl		

International career
1949	Poland	3	(0)
- * Club domestic league appearances and goals

Henryk Rybicki (5 July 1922 – 26 December 1978) was a Polish footballer who played as a goalkeeper. He played in three matches for the Poland national football team in 1949.

== Honours ==
Cracovia

- Ekstraklasa: 1948
