= Zygmunt Otto =

Polish footballer (1896–1961)

Personal information
- Date of birth: 27 July 1896
- Place of birth: Łódź, Poland
- Date of death: 22 June 1961 (aged 64)
- Place of death: Łódź, Poland
- Height: 1.59 m (5 ft 3 in)
- Position: Midfielder

Senior career*
Years	Team	Apps	(Gls)
1910–1914	ŁKS Łódź		
1920–1921	Sturm Bielsko		
1921–1924	ŁKS Łódź		

International career
1924	Poland	1	(0)

Managerial career
- Orkan Łódź
- 1930–1932: ŁKS Łódź
- 1936–1937: Łódź FA
- 1937: ŁKS Łódź
- 1946–1947: ŁKS Łódź
- 1948: Widzew Łódź
- * Club domestic league appearances and goals

Zygmunt Otto (27 July 1896 – 22 June 1961) was a Polish footballer who played as a midfielder. He made one appearance for the Poland national team in a 2–0 win over Turkey on 29 June 1924.

Following retirement, he managed several Łódź-based teams, including Orkan, ŁKS and Widzew Łódź.
