= Henryk Gajdzik =

Polish footballer

Personal information
- Date of birth: 12 February 1925
- Place of birth: Chorzów, Poland
- Height: 1.66 m (5 ft 5 in)
- Position: Midfielder

Youth career
- 1939–1942: Kresy Chorzów

Senior career*
Years	Team	Apps	(Gls)
1943–1945	Germania Königshütte		
1945–1954	AKS Chorzów		

International career
1947–1948	Poland	10	(0)
- * Club domestic league appearances and goals

Henryk Gajdzik (born 12 February 1925) was a Polish footballer who played as a midfielder.

He made ten appearances for the Poland national team from 1947 to 1948.
