= August Milde =

Polish footballer (1899 – c. 1970)

Personal information
- Date of birth: 31 October 1899
- Place of birth: Łódź, German Empire
- Date of death: c. 1970 (aged 71–72)
- Height: 1.71 m (5 ft 7 in)
- Position: Defender

Senior career*
Years	Team	Apps	(Gls)
–1920	Siła Łódź		
1920–1923	Union Łódź		
1924–1931	ŁTS-G Łódź		

International career
1926	Poland	3	(0)
- * Club domestic league appearances and goals

August Milde (31 October 1899 – c. 1970) was a Polish footballer who played as a defender. He played in three matches for the Poland national team in 1926.
