= Henryk Borucz =

Polish footballer

Personal information
- Date of birth: 10 May 1921
- Place of birth: Warsaw, Poland
- Date of death: 8 June 1984 (aged 63)
- Place of death: Warsaw, Poland
- Height: 1.78 m (5 ft 10 in)
- Position: Goalkeeper

Senior career*
Years	Team	Apps	(Gls)
1935–1937	Jur Warsaw		
1938–1939	Olszynka Grochowska		
1945–1952	Polonia Warsaw		

International career
1949–1951	Poland	5	(0)
- * Club domestic league appearances and goals

Henryk Borucz (10 May 1921 – 8 June 1984) was a Polish footballer who played as a goalkeeper. He played in five matches for the Poland national team from 1949 to 1951.

== Honours ==
Polonia Warsaw

- Ekstraklasa: 1946
- Polish Cup: 1952
