= Konstanty Haliszka =

Polish footballer

Personal information
- Full name: Konstanty Adam Haliszka
- Date of birth: 30 January 1913
- Place of birth: Kraków, Austria-Hungary
- Date of death: 20 October 1964 (aged 51)
- Place of death: Kraków, Poland
- Height: 1.72 m (5 ft 8 in)
- Position: Midfielder

Senior career*
Years	Team	Apps	(Gls)
1928–1935	Garbarnia Kraków		
1935–1936	WKS Grodno		
1936–1939	KS Chełmek		
1945–1947	KS Chełmek		

International career
1934–1935	Poland	3	(0)
- * Club domestic league appearances and goals

Konstanty Adam Haliszka (30 January 1913 – 20 October 1964) was a Polish footballer who played as a midfielder.

He played in three matches for the Poland national team from 1934 to 1935.
