= Franciszek Sobkowiak =

Polish footballer (1914–1942)

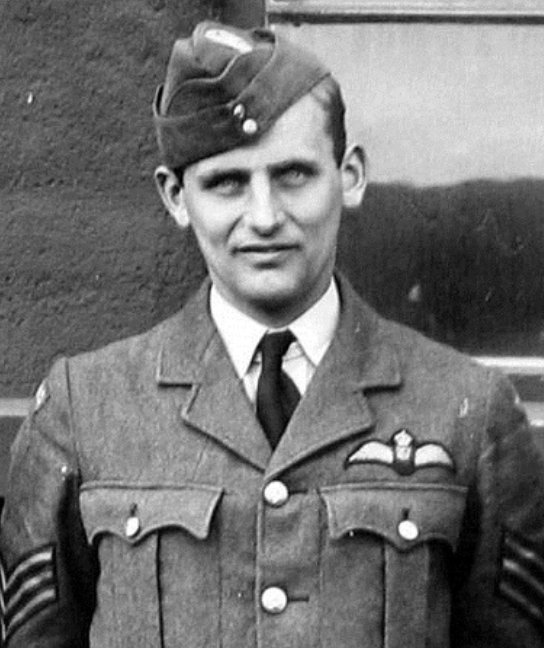
- Sobkowiak in 1942

Personal information
- Date of birth: 3 October 1914
- Date of death: 30 October 1942 (aged 28)
- Place of death: Egersund, Norway
- Position: Midfielder

Senior career*
Years	Team	Apps	(Gls)
–1934	Polonia Poznań		
1934–1939	Warta Poznań	61	(0)

International career
1938	Poland	1	(0)
- * Club domestic league appearances and goals

Franciszek Sobkowiak (3 October 1914 – 30 October 1942) was a Polish footballer who played as a midfielder. A military pilot and a recipient of the Silver Cross of the Virtuti and the Cross of Valour, he was killed in action during World War II.

He made one appearance for the Poland national team in 1938. He played for Polonia Poznań and Warta Poznań.

== World War II ==
Sobkowiak was a Flight Sergeant serving in the Royal Air Force's 138 Squadron on a S.O.E. mission to drop arms and Polish agents to the underground Polish Home Army when he was killed on the night of 29–30 October 1942. When the plane he piloted failed to rendezvous with its reception party, he flew home for RAF Tempsford via German-occupied Norway when it was shot down and crashed with loss of all hands. Initially buried 4 miles north west of Ogka, he was reburied in a collective grave at Oslo Western Civil Cemetery in 1953.
