= Stefan Kisieliński =

Polish footballer

Personal information
- Date of birth: 13 December 1901
- Place of birth: Moravská Ostrava, Austria-Hungary
- Date of death: 9 March 1951 (aged 49)
- Place of death: Warsaw, Poland
- Height: 1.78 m (5 ft 10 in)
- Position: Goalkeeper

Senior career*
Years	Team	Apps	(Gls)
1919–1924	Soła Oświęcim		
1924–1925	Bielitz SC		
1925–1927	PKS Katowice		
1927–1932	Polonia Warsaw		

International career
1926–1928	Poland	6	(0)
- * Club domestic league appearances and goals

Stefan Kisieliński (13 December 1901 – 9 March 1951) was a Polish footballer who played as a goalkeeper. His brother Walerian was also a footballer.

He earned six caps for the Poland national team from 1926 to 1928.
