= Józef Oprych =

Polish footballer

Personal information
- Date of birth: 18 February 1923
- Place of birth: Moravská Ostrava, Czechoslovakia
- Date of death: 3 December 2006 (aged 83)
- Place of death: Tarnów, Poland
- Height: 1.75 m (5 ft 9 in)
- Position: Forward

Youth career
- 1936–1938: Slovan Moravská Ostrava

Senior career*
Years	Team	Apps	(Gls)
1938	KS Chełmek		
1938–1939	Mościce Tarnów		
1947–1951	Legia Warsaw		
1952–1960	Tarnovia Tarnów		

International career
1948	Poland	1	(0)
- * Club domestic league appearances and goals

Józef Oprych (18 February 1923 – 3 December 2006) was a Polish footballer who played as a forward.

He earned one cap for the Poland national team in 1948.
