= Paweł Orzechowski =

Polish footballer (1941–2016)

Personal information
- Date of birth: 15 December 1941
- Place of birth: Bytom, Poland
- Date of death: 17 November 2016 (aged 74)
- Position: Defender

Senior career*
Years	Team	Apps	(Gls)
1961–1973	Polonia Bytom		
1973–1974	Lens	8	(0)
1974–1976	Polonia Bytom		

International career
1964–1966	Poland	4	(0)
- * Club domestic league appearances and goals

Paweł Orzechowski (15 December 1941 – 17 November 2016) was a Polish footballer who played as a defender for Polonia Bytom and Lens. He made four appearances for the Poland national team from 1964 to 1966.

== Honours ==
Polonia Bytom

- Ekstraklasa: 1962
