= Czesław Uznański =

Polish footballer

Personal information
- Date of birth: 7 December 1930
- Place of birth: Sosnowiec, Poland
- Date of death: 19 March 2014 (aged 83)
- Place of death: Sosnowiec, Poland
- Height: 1.71 m (5 ft 7 in)
- Position: Forward

Senior career*
Years	Team	Apps	(Gls)
1945–1949	Czarni Sosnowiec		
1949–1951	Stal Sosnowiec		
1952–1953	OWKS Kraków		
1954–1965	Stal Sosnowiec		

International career
1956	Poland	3	(0)

Managerial career
- 1973: Zagłębie Sosnowiec
- * Club domestic league appearances and goals

Czesław Uznański (7 December 1930 – 19 March 2014) was a Polish footballer who played as a forward.

He made three appearances for the Poland national team in 1956.

== Honours ==
Stal Sosnowiec

- II liga: 1954, 1959 (North)
- Polish Cup: 1961–62, 1962–63
