= Jan Drapała =

Polish footballer (1899–1945)

Personal information
- Date of birth: 17 June 1899
- Place of birth: Lwów, Poland
- Date of death: March/April 1945 (aged 45)
- Place of death: Johanngeorgenstadt, Germany
- Height: 1.86 m (6 ft 1 in)
- Position: Goalkeeper

Senior career*
Years	Team	Apps	(Gls)
1915–1929	Czarni Lwów		
1931–1933	Oldboye Lwów		

International career
1926	Poland	1	(0)
- * Club domestic league appearances and goals

Jan Drapała (17 June 1899 – 1945) was a Polish footballer who played as a goalkeeper. He played in one match for the Poland national football team in 1926. He was killed in an Allied air raid during World War II.
