= Antoni Böttcher =

Polish footballer

Personal information
- Full name: Antoni Józef Böttcher
- Date of birth: 19 March 1914
- Place of birth: Berlin, Germany
- Date of death: 19 February 1982 (aged 67)
- Place of death: Poznań, Poland
- Height: 1.75 m (5 ft 9 in)
- Position: Defender

Senior career*
Years	Team	Apps	(Gls)
1930–1937	HCP Poznań		
1937–1939	KPW Poznań		
1946–1947	Pogoń Poznań		

International career
1937	Poland	1	(0)

Managerial career
- 1949: Kolejarz Poznań
- 1950–1951: Kolejarz Poznań
- Kania Gostyń
- Obra Kościan
- * Club domestic league appearances and goals

Antoni Józef Böttcher (19 March 1914 – 19 February 1982) was a Polish football manager and player.

He made one appearance for the Poland national football team in 1937.
