= Jerzy Bułanow =

Polish footballer

Jerzy Bulanow
Personal information
- Date of birth: 29 April 1903
- Place of birth: Moscow, Russian Empire
- Date of death: 18 March 1980 (aged 76)
- Place of death: Buenos Aires, Argentina
- Height: 1.72 m (5 ft 8 in)
- Position: Defender

Youth career
- 1914: Nazdar Moscow
- 1914–1917: MKLS Moscow

Senior career*
Years	Team	Apps	(Gls)
1919–1922	Korona Warsaw		
1922	Legia Warsaw		
1923–1937	Polonia Warsaw		

International career
1922–1935	Poland	22	(0)

Managerial career
- 1935–1937: Polonia Warsaw
- Olszynka Grochowska
- PWATT Warsaw
- Ursus Warsaw
- * Club domestic league appearances and goals

Jerzy Bułanow (Russian: Юрий Буланов, Yury Bulanov; 29 April 1904 – 18 March 1980) was a footballer who played as a defender. Born in Russia, he represented Poland internationally.

== Early life ==
As a teenager, started playing football in Nazdar Moscow, then moved to another local team – MKLS Moscow. However, some time in late 1918 or early 1919, he moved with family (parents and three brothers) from Russia to Poland, escaping the Russian Revolution (see: White Emigre).

Bułanow, a native speaker of Russian, came to Warsaw at the age of 16. He went to a Russian Gymnasium, but also started to learn Polish. Soon became proficient in the new language, later married a Polish woman from Warsaw, also wrote numerous articles, short stories, even novels. Nevertheless, he is the most famous for his football achievements.

== Playing career ==
Together with older brother Borys, young Bułanow decided to continue football career after moving to Warsaw. The siblings briefly played for the teams of Korona Warsaw and Legia Warsaw, and in 1923, they moved to Polonia Warsaw. In Polonia, Bułanow spent 12 years, representing the team in 163 games and scoring only one goal (he was a defender, which may explain the lack of scoring abilities).

Bułanow was first capped for the Poland national team on 3 September 1922 in a 2–2 draw against Romania, while still playing for Korona Warsaw. Then, after six years, he put on white-red jersey again, in 1928, becoming a regular starter. In late 1920s and early 1930s, the Russian emigre was highly appreciated as a player. His skills, manners and leadership abilities were noticed by coaches of the Poland national team — Bułanow altogether capped for Poland 22 times, in 17 games he was the captain. Together with Legia Warsaw's Henryk Martyna, the Russian player created a great pair of defenders. He earned his last cap in a 2–3 loss to Yugoslavia on 18 August 1935.

== Post-playing career and later life ==
Bulanow ended his playing career in 1935. Then, he became a coach in several Warsaw-area teams. During World War II, he stayed in Warsaw until early 1945, when the whole family decided to escape the advancing Red Army. In February 1945, the Bułanows (parents and four brothers) went on a risky train journey from Poland, via Bohemia and Austria to Italy. On the road, one of Bułanow's brothers, Roman, died when the train was bombed by Allied aircraft.

In mid-1945, after safely reaching Italy, Bułanow joined the Second Polish Corps under General Władysław Anders. Three years later, the whole family moved to Argentina. Bułanow died in 1980 in Buenos Aires.

== Sources ==
- Biographies (in Polish)
- Dumastolicy
- Lata 1936-1946 - najtrudniejsze chwile w dziejach Legii
- Strona Historia
