= Włodzimierz Wojciechowski =

Polish footballer

Personal information
- Date of birth: 12 January 1948 (age 78)
- Place of birth: Wolsztyn, Poland
- Height: 1.80 m (5 ft 11 in)
- Position: Striker

Senior career*
Years	Team	Apps	(Gls)
1957–1969	Olimpia Poznań		
1969–1971	Pogoń Szczecin	22	(5)
1972–1976	Lech Poznań	96	(9)

International career
1972–1973	Poland	3	(0)
- * Club domestic league appearances and goals

Włodzimierz Wojciechowski (born 12 January 1948) is a Polish former footballer who played as a striker.

He made three appearances for the Poland national football team from 1972 to 1973.
