= Aleksander Tupalski =

Polish ice hockey player and footballer

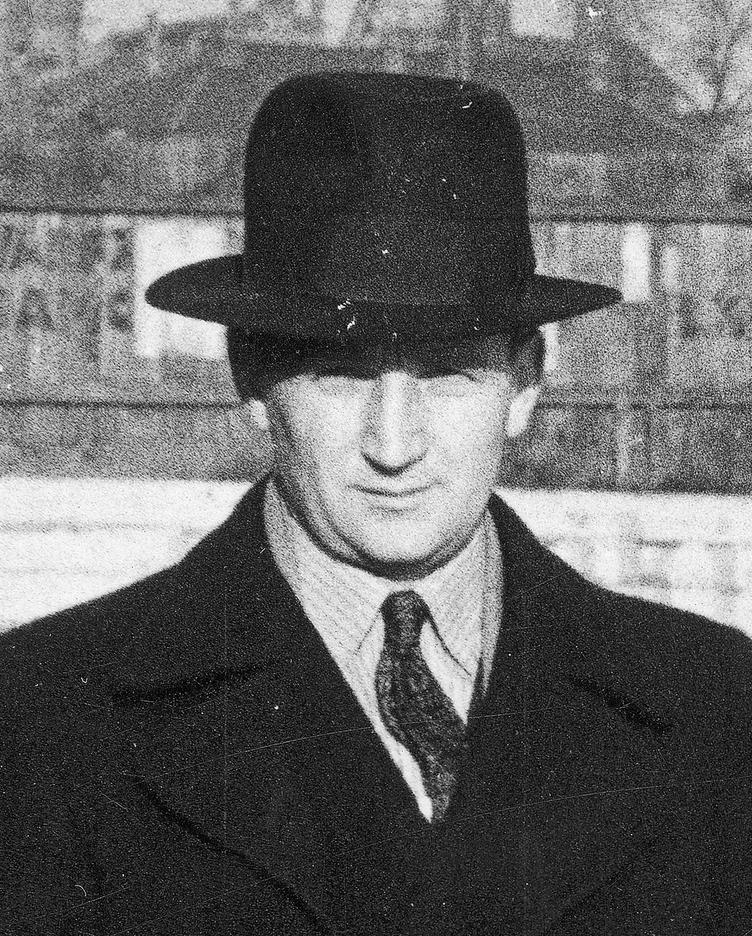

Personal information
- Full name: Aleksander Tupalski
- Date of birth: 7 October 1900
- Place of birth: Gelsenkirchen, German Empire
- Date of death: 9 January 1980 (aged 79)
- Place of death: Canberra, Australia
- Height: 1.78 m (5 ft 10 in)
- Position: Midfielder

Senior career*
Years	Team	Apps	(Gls)
1921–1923	AZS Warsaw		
1923–1928	Polonia Warsaw		
1928–1930	Gedania Danzig		

International career
1925–1926	Poland	3	(1)
- * Club domestic league appearances and goals

Aleksander Tupalski (5 October 1900 – 9 January 1980) was a Polish ice hockey and football player. He played for the Poland national team at the 1928 Winter Olympics. Born in Germany, he grew up in St. Petersburg before moving to Warsaw for education. He served in the Polish-Soviet War and Second World War, and after 1945 moved to France and subsequently Australia, working in aviation and then as a mechanic.

== Biography ==
Born in Gelsenkirchen, Germany, he spent his youth in St. Petersburg. In 1918, he went to Warsaw to study at the Warsaw University of Technology. He volunteered for the army in 1919, joining the 1st Krechowce Uhlan Regiment and serving in the Polish-Soviet War. At the onset of the Second World War, he moved to Lwów (now Lviv), and eventually France. He worked in aviation during the war, receiving recognition from both the Polish and British militaries. He continued working in aviation in France, until 1951 when he moved to Australia, becoming a mechanic in Sydney. He died in Canberra in 1980. Tupalski was married to Jadwiga Matyjewicz.

== Sport career ==
=== Football ===
Tupalski first played football in St. Petersburg with his school's team. His first matches in Poland were while serving with the Uhlans. After the end of the Polish-Soviet War in 1921 he joined AZS Warsaw, playing with them until 1923 when he switched to Polonia Warsaw. He played three international matches for Poland, scoring one goal.

=== Ice hockey ===
Aleksander Tupalski
- Born: 5 October 1900 Gelsenkirchen, German Empire
- Died: 9 January 1980 (aged 79) Canberra, Australia
- Position: Forward
- Played for: AZS Warsaw
- National team: Poland
- Playing career: 1926–1937
Medal record
Ice hockey
Representing Poland
Ice Hockey European Championships
Silver medal – second place	1929 Hungary
Silver medal – second place	1931 Poland

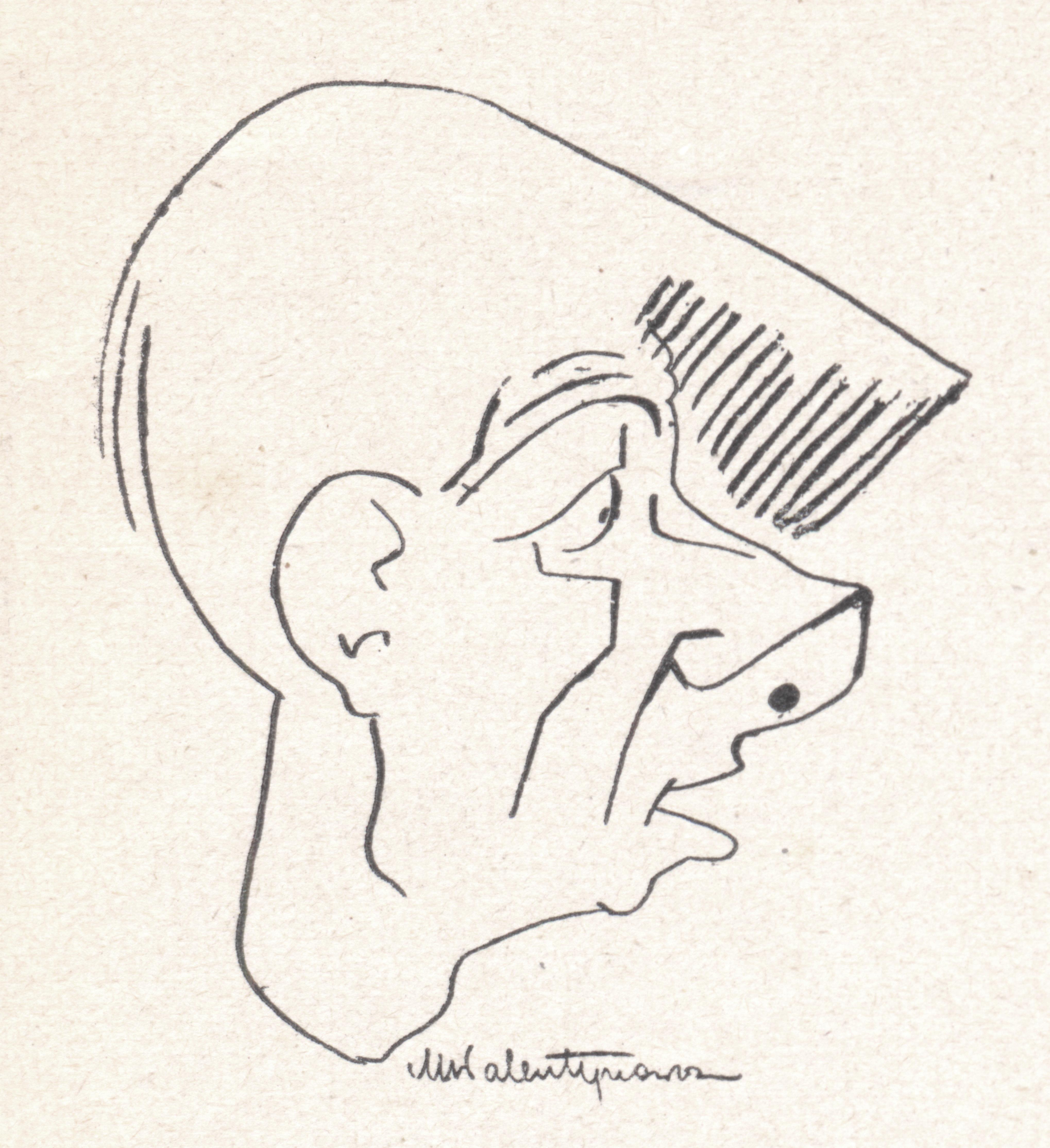
Aleksander Tupalski in a caricature by Marian Walentynowicz

Tupalski's first ice hockey team was also AZS Warsaw. During his career, he was regarded as one of the best Polish ice hockey players, scoring 29 goals in 34 matches, while playing both as a forward and defenceman. He played at the 1928 Winter Olympics with Poland, scoring his lone goal against Austria. He helped Poland win silver at the 1929 European Championship. Two years later, at the 1931 World Championship, which concurrently served as the European Championship, Tupalski helped Poland again win silver.
