= Hieronim Schwartz =

Polish footballer

Personal information
- Full name: Hieronim Edmund Schwartz
- Date of birth: 20 March 1912
- Place of birth: Berlin, German Empire
- Date of death: 2 August 1978 (aged 66)
- Place of death: New Britain, Connecticut, United States
- Position: Forward

Youth career
- Victoria Poznań
- Warta Poznań

Senior career*
Years	Team	Apps	(Gls)
1933–1939	Warta Poznań		

International career
1936	Poland	1	(1)
- * Club domestic league appearances and goals

Hieronim Edmund Schwartz (20 March 1912 – 2 August 1978) was a Polish footballer who played as a forward.

He made one appearance for the Poland national team in 1936.
