= Czesław Ciupa =

Polish footballer (1935-1988)

Personal information
- Date of birth: 2 August 1935
- Place of birth: Mont-Bonvillers, France
- Date of death: 29 July 1988 (aged 52)
- Place of death: Warsaw, Poland
- Height: 1.70 m (5 ft 7 in)
- Position: Forward

Youth career
- 1950–1953: Ogniwo Bytom

Senior career*
Years	Team	Apps	(Gls)
1953–1955	Polonia Bytom		
1956–1961	Legia Warsaw		
1962–1966	Lublinianka		
1966	Avia Świdnik		
1966–1967	Warszawianka		

International career
1956–1957	Poland	3	(0)
- * Club domestic league appearances and goals

Czesław Ciupa (2 August 1935 – 29 July 1988) was a Polish footballer who played as a forward. He played in three matches for the Poland national team from 1956 to 1957.

== Honours ==
Polonia Bytom

- Ekstraklasa: 1954

Legia Warsaw

- Ekstraklasa: 1956
- Polish Cup: 1955–56
