= Antoni Malczyk =

Polish footballer

Personal information
- Date of birth: 31 March 1902
- Place of birth: Kraków, Austria-Hungary
- Date of death: 19 December 1972 (aged 70)
- Place of death: Kraków, Poland
- Height: 1.69 m (5 ft 7 in)
- Position: Goalkeeper

Senior career*
Years	Team	Apps	(Gls)
1920–1924	Olsza Kraków		
1923	Korona Kraków		
1924–1925	Wawel Kraków		
1925–1933	Cracovia		

International career
1925	Poland	2	(0)
- * Club domestic league appearances and goals

Antoni Malczyk (31 March 1902 – 19 December 1972) was a Polish footballer who played as a goalkeeper.

He played in two matches for the Poland national football team in 1925.
