= Lucjan Rudnicki (footballer) =

Polish footballer

Personal information
- Full name: Lucjan Zdzisław Rudnicki
- Date of birth: 30 June 1913
- Place of birth: Warsaw, Poland
- Date of death: 20 October 1964 (aged 51)
- Place of death: Warsaw, Poland
- Height: 1.78 m (5 ft 10 in)
- Position: Goalkeeper

Youth career
- 1928–1933: Warszawianka

Senior career*
Years	Team	Apps	(Gls)
1933–1939	Warszawianka		
1945–1948	Syrena Warsaw		

International career
1936	Poland	1	(0)
- * Club domestic league appearances and goals

Lucjan Zdzisław Rudnicki (30 June 1913 – 20 October 1964) was a Polish footballer who played as a goalkeeper.

He made one appearance for the Poland national team, in a 3–3 draw against Latvia on 6 September 1936.
