= Stefan Domański =

Polish footballer

Personal information
- Full name: Stefan Paweł Domański
- Date of birth: 18 February 1904
- Place of birth: Warsaw, Russian Empire
- Date of death: 23 July 1961 (aged 57)
- Place of death: Warsaw, Poland
- Height: 1.70 m (5 ft 7 in)
- Position: Goalkeeper

Youth career
- 1915–1919: Slavia Warsaw

Senior career*
| Years | Team | Apps | (Gls) |
| 1919–1921 | Polonia Warsaw | | |
| 1921–1936 | KS Warszawianka | | |

International career
| 1924–1934 | Poland | 6 | (0) |
- * Club domestic league appearances and goals

Stefan Domański (18 February 1904 – 23 July 1961) was a Polish footballer who played as a goalkeeper.

He made six appearances for the Poland national team from 1924 to 1934.
