= Jan Kauder =

Polish footballer

Personal information
- Date of birth: 16 February 1931
- Place of birth: Leipzig, Germany
- Date of death: 29 May 1990 (aged 59)
- Place of death: Bytom, Poland
- Height: 1.78 m (5 ft 10 in)
- Position: Midfielder

Senior career*
Years	Team	Apps	(Gls)
1951–1957	Polonia Bytom		
1958	Pogoń Szczecin		
1959	Legia Krosno		

International career
1953	Poland	1	(0)
- * Club domestic league appearances and goals

Jan Kauder (16 February 1931 – 29 May 1990) was a Polish footballer who played as a midfielder.

He earned one cap for the Poland national team in 1953.

== Honours ==
Polonia Bytom

- Ekstraklasa: 1954
