= Piotr Czaja =

Polish footballer

Personal information
- Date of birth: 11 February 1944 (age 82)
- Place of birth: Lindenbrück, Germany
- Height: 1.80 m (5 ft 11 in)
- Position: Goalkeeper

Senior career*
Years	Team	Apps	(Gls)
–1962	Bobrek Karb Bytom		
1963–1964	Slavia Ruda Śląska		
1964–1970	GKS Katowice		
1970–1979	Ruch Chorzów	205	(0)

International career
1970	Poland	2	(0)

Managerial career
- 1981–1982: Ruch Chorzów
- * Club domestic league appearances and goals

Piotr Czaja (born 11 February 1944) is a Polish former footballer who played as a goalkeeper.

He earned two caps for the Poland national team in 1970.

== Honours ==
Ruch Chorzów

- Ekstraklasa: 1973–74, 1974–75, 1975–76
- Polish Cup: 1973–74
