= Adam Walczak =

Polish footballer

Personal information
- Date of birth: 7 December 1957 (age 68)
- Place of birth: Sopot, Poland
- Height: 1.81 m (5 ft 11 in)
- Position: Defender

Senior career*
Years	Team	Apps	(Gls)
1975–1977	Bałtyk Gdynia		
1978–1980	Zawisza Bydgoszcz		
1980–1985	Bałtyk Gdynia		
1985–1989	Widzew Łódź	74	(2)
1989–1990	Bałtyk Gdynia		
1990–1994	Finnskoga FF		

International career
1980–1981	Poland	4	(1)

Managerial career
- 1997–1999: Bałtyk Gdynia
- 2001–2006: Orkan Rumia
- OKS Janowo
- Wierzyca Pelplin
- * Club domestic league appearances and goals

Adam Stanisław Walczak (born 7 December 1957) is a Polish former professional footballer who played as a defender.

He made four appearances for the Poland national team from 1980 to 1981.

== Honours ==
=== Manager ===
Bałtyk Gdynia

- IV liga Gdańsk-Słupsk: 1998–99
