= Ryszard Szpakowski =

Polish footballer

Personal information
- Date of birth: 16 May 1951 (age 75)
- Place of birth: Słupsk, Poland
- Height: 1.79 m (5 ft 10 in)
- Position: Forward

Senior career*
Years	Team	Apps	(Gls)
1960–1979	Cieśliki Słupsk		
1969–1970	Gryf Słupsk		
1970	Gwardia Warsaw	3	(0)
1971	Olimpia Poznań		
1971–1982	Lech Poznań	179	(31)
1982–1984	Stilon Gorzów	35	(4)
1984–1985	Lubuszanin Drezdenko		

International career
1974	Poland	1	(0)
- * Club domestic league appearances and goals

Ryszard Szpakowski (born 16 May 1951) is a Polish former professional footballer who played as a forward. He played in one match for the Poland national team in 1974.
