= Poland national football team results (1921–1939) =

- Win Draw Loss

This is a list of the Poland national football team results since 1921 to 1939.

Between their first match in 1920 and 1939, when competitive football stopped for the Second World War, Poland played in 83 matches, resulting in 30 victories, 17 draws and 36 defeats.

== 1920s ==
=== 1921 ===
| 18 December 1921 Friendly | Hungary | 1–0 | Poland | Budapest, Hungary |
| 14:00 | Szabó 18' | Report | | Stadium: Hungária körúti Stadion; Attendance: 8,000; Referee: Emil Grätz (Czechoslovakia) |

=== 1922 ===
| 14 May 1922 Friendly | Poland | 0–3 | Hungary | Kraków, Poland |
| 17:30 | | Report | Seiden 6'; Solti 44', 81' | Stadium: Stadion Cracovia; Attendance: 16,000; Referee: Emil Grätz (Czechoslovakia) |

| 28 May 1922 Friendly | Sweden | 1–2 | Poland | Stockholm, Sweden |
| 13:45 | Svedberg 56' | Report | Klotz 27' (pen.); Garbień 74' | Stadium: Stockholms Olympiastadion; Attendance: 16,142; Referee: Hugo Meisl (Austria) |

| 3 September 1922 Friendly | Romania | 1–1 | Poland | Cernăuți, Romania |
| 17:00 | Kozovits 63' | Report | Duźniak 20' | Stadium: Stadionul Maccabi; Attendance: 6,000; Referee: Hans Schmidt (Austria) |

| 1 October 1922 Friendly | Yugoslavia | 1–3 | Poland | Zagreb, Yugoslavia |
| 15:15 | Vinek 35' | Report | Kałuża 8', 57'; Garbień 74' | Stadium: Stadion H.A.Š.K. Attendance: 4,000; Referee: Heinrich Retschury (Austria) |

=== 1923 ===
| 3 June 1923 Friendly | Poland | 1–2 | Yugoslavia | Kraków, Poland |
| 17:30 | Kałuża 49' | Report | Perška 16'; Zinaja 86' | Stadium: Stadion Cracovia; Attendance: 13,000; Referee: Heinrich Retschury (Austria) |

| 2 September 1923 Friendly | Poland | 1–1 | Romania | Lwów, Poland |
| 16:00 | Kuchar 16' | Report | Guga 38' | Stadium: Stadion Czarnych; Attendance: 10,000; Referee: Carl Koppehel (Germany) |

| 23 September 1923 Friendly | Finland | 5–3 | Poland | Helsinki, Finland |
| | Eklöf 15', 37'; Linna 23'; Korma 60', 70' | Report | Staliński 37', 80'; Müller 83' | Stadium: Töölön Pallokenttä; Attendance: 3,000; Referee: August Silber-Sillak (Estonia) |

| 30 September 1923 Friendly | Estonia | 1–4 | Poland | Tallinn, Estonia |
| 16:30 | Joll 86' | Report | Batsch 20'; Kowalski 38', 65'; Staliński 77' | Stadium: Kalevi Staadion; Attendance: 4,000; Referee: Verner Eklöf (Finland) |

| 1 November 1923 Friendly | Poland | 2–2 | Sweden | Kraków, Poland |
| 15:00 | Staliński 7', 49' | Report | Dahl 15'; Helgesson 78' | Stadium: Stadion Cracovia; Attendance: 10,000; Referee: Imre Vértes (Hungary) |

=== 1924 ===
| 18 May 1924 Friendly | Sweden | 5–1 | Poland | Stockholm, Sweden |
| 14:00 | Rydell 6', 61', 83'; Olsson 49'; Svensson 69' | Report | Batsch 57' | Stadium: Olympiastadion; Attendance: 13,000; Referee: Willem Boas (Netherlands) |

| 26 May 1924 1924 Summer Olympics | Hungary | 5–0 | Poland | Paris, France |
| 17:00 | Eisenhoffer 14'; Hirzer 51', 58'; Opata 70', 87' | Report | | Stadium: Stade Bergeyre; Attendance: 3,578; Referee: Job Mutters (Netherlands) |

| 10 June 1924 Friendly | Poland | 2–3 | United States | Legia, Poland |
| 17:30 | Czulak 6'; Chruściński 32' | Report; Report | Wells 15'; Straden 30', 47' | Stadium: Stadion Agrykola; Attendance: 8,000; Referee: Mihály Iváncsics (Hungary) |

| 29 June 1924 Friendly | Poland | 2–0 | Turkey | Łódź, Poland |
| 17:30 | Balcer 42'; Reyman 43' | Report | | Stadium: Łódź City Stadium; Attendance: 6,000; Referee: Mihály Iváncsics (Hungary) |

| 10 August 1924 Friendly | Poland | 1–0 | Finland | Legia, Poland |
| 17:00 | Reyman 59' | Report | | Stadium: Stadion Agrykola; Attendance: 4,000; Referee: Mihály Iváncsics (Hungary) |

| 31 August 1924 Friendly | Hungary | 4–0 | Poland | Budapest, Hungary |
| 16:30 (UTC+1:00) | Karasiak 31'; Takács 38', 40'; Orth 59' | Report | | Stadium: Üllői úti stadion Attendance: 25,000; Referee: Heinrich Plhak (Austria) |

=== 1925 ===
| 19 July 1925 Friendly | Poland | 0–2 | Hungary | Kraków, Poland |
| 17:30 (UTC+1:00) | Winkler 59'; Holzbauer 78' | Report | | Stadium: Stadion Wisły; Attendance: 8,000; Referee: Eugen Braun (Austria) |

| 30 August 1925 Friendly | Finland | 2–2 | Poland | Helsinki, Finland |
| 15:00 (UTC+1:00) | Linna 40'; Kulmala 85' | Report | Staliński 57'; Kałuża 60' | Stadium: Tölö bollplan Attendance: 2,500; Referee: Trygve Høgberg (Norway) |

| 2 September 1925 Friendly | Estonia | 0–0 | Poland | Tallinn, Estonia |
| 15:00 (UTC+1:00) | | Report | | Stadium: Kalevi Keskstaadion; Attendance: 3,000; Referee: August Silber (Estonia) |

| 2 October 1926 Friendly | Turkey | 1–2 | Poland | Istanbul, Turkey |
| 16:00 (UTC+1:00) | Günel 5' | Report | Adamek 26'; Sperling 65' | Stadium: Taksim Stadium; Attendance: 7,000; Referee: Peco Bauwens (Germany) |

| 1 November 1926 Friendly | Poland | 2–6 | Sweden | Kraków, Poland |
| 14:00 (UTC+1:00) | Sperling 23'; Kuchar 62' | Report | Dahl 7', 9'; Johansson 25', 28', 30'; Rydberg 40' | Stadium: Stadion Cracovii; Attendance: 6,000; Referee: František Cejnar (Czechoslovakia) |

=== 1926 ===
| 4 July 1926 Friendly | Poland | 2–0 | Sweden | Legia, Poland |
| 15:30 (UTC+1:00) | Sobota 13'; Tupalski 68' | Report | | Stadium: Stadion Agrykola; Attendance: 4,000; Referee: Imre Vértes (Hungary) |

| 8 August 1926 Friendly | Poland | 7–1 | Sweden | Poznań, Poland |
| 16:00 (UTC+1:00) | Staliński 9', 60', 72'; Batsch 33' (pen.); Batsch 44', 77', 90'; Tupalski 68' | Report | Laaksonen 40' | Stadium: Stadion Warty; Attendance: 9,000; Referee: František Cejnar (Czechoslovakia) |
Note: Wawrzyniec Staliński set the goal scoring record for Poland (9 goals)

| 20 August 1926 Friendly | Hungary | 4–1 | Poland | Budapest, Hungary |
| 17:00 (UTC+1:00) | Kautzky 9'; Horváth 31'; Fogl 42'; Senkey 61' | Report | Staliński 48' | Stadium: Üllői úti stadion Attendance: 9,000; Referee: Ernest Fabris (Yugoslavia) |

| 12 September 1926 Friendly | Poland | 6–1 | Turkey | Lemberg, Poland |
| 16:00 | Steuermann 50', 68', 71'; Batsch 27', 77'; Balcer 48' | Report | Baydar 86' | Stadium: Polish Army Stadium; Attendance: 10,000; Referee: František Cejnar (Czechoslovakia) |

| 3 October 1926 Friendly | Sweden | 3–1 | Poland | Stockholm, Sweden |
| 13:00 (UTC+1) | Rydberg 30', 31'; Keller 43' | Report | Adamek 54' | Stadium: Stockholm Olympic Stadium; Attendance: 17,000; Referee: Ragnvald Smedvik (Norway) |

| 10 October 1926 Friendly | Norway | 3–4 | Poland | Fredrikstad, Norway |
| 13:00 (UTC+1) | Steen 42', 76'; Andersen 54' | Report | Balcer 58', 86'; Kałuża 62', 63' | Stadium: Fredrikstad Idræts- og Fotbaldplads; Attendance: 5,000; Referee: Lauritz Andersen (Denmark) |

=== 1927 ===
| 19 June 1927 Friendly | Romania | 3–3 | Poland | Bucharest, Romania |
| 18:00 | Avar 12', 60'; Tänzer 41' | Report | Kałuża 51'; Pazurek 64'; Wójcik 76' | Stadium: Stadionul ONEF; Attendance: 8,000; Referee: Ladislav Štépanovský (Czechoslovakia) |

=== 1928 ===
| 18 June 1928 Friendly | Poland | 3–3 | United States | Legia, Poland |
| 17:30 | Kuchar 12', 78'; Steuermann 89' | Report; Report | Ryan 59' (pen.); Straden 64'; Carroll 74' | Stadium: Stadion Agrykola; Attendance: 8,000; Referee: František Cejnar (Czechoslovakia) |

| 1 July 1928 Friendly | Poland | 2–1 | Sweden | Katowice, Poland |
| 18:30 | Staliński 25', 70' | Report | Persson 10' | Stadium: 1. FC Katowice's field Attendance: 17,000; Referee: Peco Bauwens (Germany) |
Note: Wawrzyniec Staliński set the goal-scoring record for Poland (11 goals)

| 27 October 1928 1928 Slavic Tournament | Czechoslovakia | 3–2 | Poland | Prague, Czechoslovakia |
| 15:00 (UTC+1:00) | Puč 31', 61'; Bejbl 33' | Report | Reyman 69', 72' | Stadium: Stadion Letná; Attendance: 5,000; Referee: Eugen Braun (Austria) |

== 1930s ==
=== 1930 ===
| 28 September 1930 Friendly | Sweden | 0–3 | Poland | Stockholm, Sweden |
| 14:00 (UTC+1) | | Report | Ciszewski 39', 69'; Smoczek 43' | Stadium: Stockholm Olympic Stadium; Attendance: 20,000; Referee: Matti Aalto (Finland) |

| 26 October 1930 Friendly | Poland | 6–0 | Latvia | Warsaw, Poland |
| 18:30 | Nawrot 11', 28', 71', 89'; Malik 33'; Balcer 87' | Report | | Stadium: Stadion Wojska Polskiego; Attendance: 10,000; Referee: Alfred Birlem (Germany) |

=== 1931 ===
| 14 June 1931 Friendly | Poland | 0–4 | Czechoslovakia | Warsaw, Poland |
| 18:00 (+1:00) | | Report | Pelcner 1', 53'; Bára 62'; Nejedlý 66' | Stadium: Stadion Wojska Polskiego; Attendance: 13,000; Referee: Eric Malmström (Sweden) |

| 5 July 1931 Friendly | Latvia | 0–5 | Poland | Rīga, Latvia |
| 14:00 (UTC+1) | Kossok 21', 33'; Kisieliński 37', 40'; Reyman 83' | Report | | Stadium: LSB Rīga; Attendance: 2,500; Referee: Alfred Birlem (Germany) |

| 23 August 1931 Friendly | Poland | 2–3 | Romania | Warsaw, Poland |
| 17:00 | Nawrot 80'; Wypijewski 87' | Report | Sepi 5', 78'; 29' Kocsis | Stadium: Stadion Wojska Polskiego; Attendance: 10,000; Referee: František Cejnar (Czechoslovakia) |

| 11 October 1931 Friendly | Belgium | 2–1 | Poland | Brussels, Belgium |
| 15:00 (UTC+1) | Hellemans 9'; Voorhoof 50' | Report | Wypijewski 78' | Stadium: Stade du Vivier d'Oie; Attendance: 40,000; Referee: Job Mutters (Netherlands) |

| 25 October 1931 Friendly | Poland | 6–3 | Kingdom of Yugoslavia | Poznań, Poland |
| 14:30 (+1:00) | Balcer 4', 12', 51'; Martyna 22'; Kniola 26', 40' | Report | Bek 17'; Hitrec 32', 53' | Stadium: Edmund Szyc Stadium; Attendance: 15,000; Referee: Gustav Krist (Czechoslovakia) |

=== 1932 ===
| 29 May 1932 Friendly | Yugoslavia | 0–3 | Poland | Zagreb, Yugoslavia |
| 17:15 (+1:00) | | Report | Nawrot 46', 71'; Ciszewski 52' | Stadium: Gradanskog; Attendance: 6,000; Referee: Gustav Krist (Czechoslovakia) |

| 10 July 1932 Friendly | Poland | 2–0 | Sweden | Warsaw, Poland |
| 17:30 | Nawrot 12'; Bator 84' | Report | | Stadium: Stadion Wojska Polskiego; Attendance: 13,000; Referee: Alfred Birlem (Germany) |

| 2 October 1932 Friendly | Poland | 2–1 | Latvia | Warsaw, Poland |
| 15:30 | Kossok 52'; Radojewski 89' | Report | Tauriņš 19' | Stadium: Stadion Wojska Polskiego; Attendance: 8,000; Referee: Radu Istrate (Romania) |

| 2 October 1932 Friendly | Romania | 0–5 | Poland | Bucharest, Romania |
| 19:30 (UTC+3:00) | | Report | Matyas 5'; Nawrot 8', 25', 78'; Urban 38' | Stadium: Stadionul ONEF; Attendance: 8,000; Referee: Josip Fabris (Kingdom of Yugoslavia) |

=== 1933 ===
| 4 June 1933 Friendly | Poland | 0–1 | Belgium | Warsaw, Poland |
| 17:00 | | Report | Brichaut 39' | Stadium: Stadion Wojska Polskiego; Attendance: 16,000; Referee: František Cejnar (Czechoslovakia) |

| 10 September 1933 Friendly | Poland | 4–3 | Yugoslavia | Warsaw, Poland |
| 16:00 | Nawrot 10', 46'; Majowski 76'; Król 88' | Report | Vujadinović 29', 41'; Tirnanić 89' | Stadium: Stadion Wojska Polskiego; Attendance: 8,000; Referee: Bohumil Ženišek (Czechoslovakia) |

| 15 October 1933 1934 FIFA World Cup qualification | Poland | 1–2 | Czechoslovakia | Warsaw, Poland |
| | Martyna 52' (pen.) | Report | Silný 33'; Pelcner 77' | Stadium: Polish Army Stadium; Attendance: 16,000; Referee: Denis Xifando (Romania) |

| 3 December 1933 Friendly | Germany | 1–0 | Poland | Berlin, Germany |
| 14:00 (UTC+1:00) | | Report | Rasselnberg 89' | Stadium: Poststadion; Attendance: 40,000; Referee: Otto Olsson (Sweden) |

=== 1934 ===
| 15 April 1934 1934 FIFA World Cup qualification | Czechoslovakia | 2–0 awarded (Note: Poland were unable to travel to Prague for the second match as the Polish government denied the team visas for political reasons. The match was awarded as 2–0 to Czechoslovakia.) | Poland | Prague, Czechoslovakia |
Note: Czechoslovakia qualified.

| 23 May 1934 Friendly | Sweden | 4–2 | Poland | Stockholm, Sweden |
| 19:15 (UTC+1:00) | Jonasson 13'; Keller 36', 70', 74' | Report | Nawrot 26'; Wilimowski 59' | Stadium: Olympiastadion; Attendance: 20,000; Referee: Yrjö Tuhkunen (Finland) |

| 26 August 1934 Friendly | Yugoslavia | 4–1 | Poland | Belgrade, Kingdom of Yugoslavia |
| 16:30 | Sekulić 24', 42', 51'; Marjanović 78' | Report | Wilimowski 54' | Stadium: Stadion SK Jugoslavija; Attendance: 12,000; Referee: Denis Xifando (Romania) |

| 9 September 1934 Friendly | Poland | 2–5 | Germany | Lviv, Poland |
| 16:00 (+1:00) | Wilimowski 28'; Pazurek 55' | Report | Lehner 15', 80' (pen.); Hohmann 77'; Siffling 78'; Szepan 83' | Stadium: Marshal Józef Piłsudski Polish Army Stadium; Attendance: 33,000; Referee: Otto Olsson (Sweden) |

| 14 October 1934 Friendly | Poland | 3–3 | Romania | Lviv, Poland |
| 12:00 (UTC+1:00) | Martyna 12' (pen.), 63' (pen.); Urban 60' | Report | Dobay 52', 86'; Ciolac 52' | Stadium: Marshal Józef Piłsudski Polish Army Stadium; Attendance: 6,000; Referee: Josip Fabris (Kingdom of Yugoslavia) |

| 14 October 1934 Friendly | Latvia | 2–6 | Poland | Rīga, Latvia |
| 15:00 (UTC+2:00) | Priede 32'; Jēnihs 33' | Report | Pazurek 9'; Wodarz 14', 64', 75'; Łysakowski 30'; Peterek 45' (pen.) | Stadium: J.K.S. stadion Attendance: 5,000; Referee: Esko Pekonen (Finland) |

=== 1935 ===
| 12 May 1935 Friendly | Austria | 5–2 | Poland | Vienna, Austria |
| | Stoiber 12'; Vogl 25', 71'; Hahnemann 31'; Pesser 46' | Report | Matyas 44', 63' | Stadium: Praterstadion; Attendance: 16,000; Referee: Hertzka Pál (Hungary) |

| 18 August 1935 Friendly | Poland | 2–3 | Yugoslavia | Warsaw, Poland |
| 16:30 (+1:00) | Matyas 24'; Peterek 35' | Report | Živković 60', 61'; Sekulić 81' | Stadium: Stadion Wojska Polskiego; Attendance: 12,000; Referee: Alfred Birlem (Germany) |

| 15 September 1935 Friendly | Poland | 3–3 | Latvia | Łódź, Poland |
| 16:00 (+1:00) | Smoczek 47'; Malczyk 54'; Borowski 66' | Report | Škincs 12'; Pētersons 25'; Verners 57' | Stadium: Stadion Miejski; Attendance: 15,000; Referee: Hans Frankenstein (Austria) |

| 15 September 1935 Friendly | Germany | 1–0 | Poland | Breslau, Germany |
| 16:00 (UTC+1:00) | | Report | Conen 34' | Stadium: Hermann Göring Stadium; Attendance: 35,000; Referee: Otto Olsson (Sweden) |

| 6 October 1935 Friendly | Poland | 1–0 | Austria | Warsaw, Poland |
| 12:00 (UTC+1:00) | Matyas 34' | Report | | Stadium: Stadion Wojska Polskiego; Attendance: 25,000; Referee: Juris Rēdlihs (Latvia) |

| 3 November 1935 Friendly | Romania | 4–1 | Poland | Bucharest, Romania |
| 15:00 (+2:00) | Schileru 1'; Bindea 20', 35'; Sepi 73' | (Report) | Pazurek 36' | Stadium: Stadionul ONEF; Attendance: 20,000; Referee: Jovan Ružić (Kingdom of Yugoslavia) |

=== 1936 ===
| 16 February 1936 Friendly | Yugoslavia | 0–2 | Poland | Brussels, Belgium |
| 14:30 | | Report | Piec 3'; Gad 76' | Stadium: Stade du Vivier d'Oie; Attendance: 12,000; Referee: Walter Lewington (England) |

| 13 August 1936 1936 Summer Olympics; Bronze medal match | Norway | 3–2 | Poland | Berlin, Germany |
| 16:00 (UTC+1) | Brustad 15', 21', 84' | Report | Wodarz 5'; Peterek 24' | Stadium: Olympiastadion; Attendance: 95,000; Referee: Alfred Birlem (Germany) |

| 6 September 1936 Friendly | Latvia | 3–3 | Poland | Rīga, Latvia |
| 12:00 (UTC+2:00) | Pētersons 60'; Rozītis 72', 79' | Report | Wostal 20'; Matyas 37'; Schwartz 58' | Stadium: J.K.S. stadion Attendance: 8,000; Referee: Hans Frankenstein (Austria) |

| 6 September 1936 Friendly | Yugoslavia | 9–3 | Poland | Belgrade, Kingdom of Yugoslavia |
| 16:00 (UTC+1:00) | Marjanović 3', 19', 44', 75'; Perlić 11', 61'; Božović 35', 67'; Tirnanić 85' | Report | Peterek 53' (pen.), 78'; Wodarz 80' | Stadium: Beogradski SK Stadium; Attendance: 12,000; Referee: Gustav Krist (Czechoslovakia) |

| 13 September 1936 Friendly | Poland | 1–1 | Germany | Warsaw, Poland |
| 15:30 (+1:00) | Wodarz 75' | Report | Hohmann 40' | Stadium: Stadion Wojska Polskiego; Attendance: 40,000; Referee: Rudolf Eklöw (Sweden) |

| 4 October 1936 Friendly | Yugoslavia | 2–1 | Poland | Copenhagen, Denmark |
| 13:30 (UTC+1:00) | Stoltz 50', 66' | Report | Gad 22' | Stadium: Idrætsparken; Attendance: 18,000; Referee: Willy Peters (Germany) |

=== 1937 ===
| 23 June 1937 Friendly | Poland | 3–1 | Sweden | Warsaw, Poland |
| 18:00 (UTC+1:00) | Wodarz 12'; Piątek 24'; Wilimowski 62' | Report | Wetterström 76' | Stadium: Stadion Wojska Polskiego; Attendance: 18,000; Referee: Lucien Leclerq (France) |

| 4 July 1937 Friendly | Poland | 2–4 | Romania | Łódź, Poland |
| 18:00 | Piontek 2'; Matyas 25' | Report | Dobay 13'; Barátky 14', 82'; Bodola 18' | Stadium: Stadion ŁKS; Attendance: 20,000; Referee: Klug Frigyes (Hungary) |

| 12 September 1937 Friendly | Bulgaria | 3–3 | Poland | Copenhagen, Denmark |
| | Iliev 3'; Angelov 29'; Yordanov 48' | Report | Korbas 4', 72', 74' | Stadium: Idrætsparken; Attendance: 10,000; Referee: Mika Popović (Kingdom of Yugoslavia) |

| 12 September 1937 Friendly | Poland | 3–1 | Denmark | Warsaw, Poland |
| 16:00 (UTC+1:00) | Wilimowski 11'; Król 27'; Piec 56' | Report | Iversen 12' | Stadium: Stadion Wojska Polskiego; Attendance: 20,000; Referee: Alfred Birlem (Germany) |

| 10 October 1937 1938 World Cup qualifying | Poland | 4–0 | Yugoslavia | Warsaw, Poland |
| 12:00 | Piątek 3', 20'; Wostal 59'; Wilimowski 78' | Report | | Stadium: Stadion Wojska Polskiego; Attendance: 30,000; Referee: Lucien Leclercq (France) |

| 10 October 1937 Friendly | Poland | 2–1 | Latvia | Katowice, Poland |
| 15:00 (UTC+1:00) | Pytel 54'; Piec 62' | Report | Rozītis 68' | Stadium: Stadion Pogoni; Attendance: 22,000; Referee: Denis Xifando (Romania) |

=== 1938 ===
| 13 March 1938 Friendly | Switzerland | 3–3 | Poland | Zürich, Switzerland |
| 12:00 (UTC+1:00) | Amadò 31', 54'; Abegglen 88' (pen.) | Report | Wilimowski 13'; Wostal 74'; Piątek 85' | Stadium: Hardturm; Attendance: 18,000; Referee: Rinadlo Barlassina (Italy) |

| 3 April 1938 1938 World Cup qualifying | Yugoslavia | 1–0 | Poland | Belgrade, Kingdom of Yugoslavia |
| 15:30 (UTC+1:00) | Marjanović 61' | Report | | Stadium: Beogradski SK Stadium; Attendance: 26,000; Referee: Rinadlo Barlassina (Italy) |

| 22 May 1938 Friendly | Poland | 6–0 | Republic of Ireland | Warsaw, Poland |
| 15:30 | Wasiewicz 12'; Wodarz 21', 78'; Piątek 43', 52'; Wilimowski 58' | Report | | Stadium: Stadion Wojska Polskiego; Attendance: 25,000; Referee: Ferenc Majorszky (Hungary) |

| 5 June 1938 1938 World Cup Round of 16 | Brazil | 6–5 (a.e.t.) | Poland | Strasbourg, Germany |
| 17:30 WEST (UTC+01:00) | Leônidas 18', 93', 104'; Romeu 25'; Perácio 44', 71' | Report | Scherfke 23' (pen.); Wilimowski 53', 59', 89', 118' | Stadium: Stade de la Meinau; Attendance: 13,452; Referee: Ivan Eklind (Sweden) |

| 18 September 1938 1938 World Cup qualifying | Germany | 4–1 | Poland | Chemnitz, Germany |
| 15:00 | Gauchel 35', 59', 62'; Schön 52' | Report | Peterek 49' | Stadium: Großkampfbahn; Attendance: 60,000; Referee: Hans Wüthrich (Switzerland) |

| 25 September 1938 Friendly | Latvia | 2–1 | Poland | Rīga, Latvia |
| 15:00 | Vanags 26'; Šeibelis 83' | Report | Habowski 36' | Stadium: ASK Riga; Attendance: 14,000; Referee: Matti Aalto (Finland) |

| 25 September 1938 1938 King Piotr II Cup | Poland | 4–4 | Yugoslavia | Warsaw, Poland |
| 15:30 | Korbas 28'; Wilimowski 36', 84'; Piątek 58' | Report | Velker 44', 62'; Kokotović 51' (pen.); Wölfl 70' | Stadium: Stadion Wojska Polskiego; Attendance: 35,000; Referee: Ivan Eklind (Sweden) |

| 23 October 1938 Friendly | Poland | 2–2 | Norway | Warsaw, Poland |
| 14:00 (UTC+1) | Piec 73'; Wilimowski 80' | Report | Nordahl 6'; A. Martinsen 41' | Stadium: Polish Army Stadium; Attendance: 16,000; Referee: John Langenus (Belgium) |

| 13 November 1938 Friendly | Republic of Ireland | 3–2 | Poland | Dublin, Ireland |
| 14:15 | Fallon 10'; Carey 12'; Dunne 68' | Report | Wilimowski 17'; Piątek 83' | Stadium: Dalymount Park; Attendance: 34,295; Referee: Peco Bauwens (Germany) |

=== 1939 ===
| 22 January 1939 Friendly | France | 4–0 | Poland | Paris, France |
| 14:15 | Veinante 16', 57'; Heisserer 41'; Zatelli 70' | Report | | Stadium: Parc des Princes; Attendance: 35,000; Referee: Walter Jordan (Switzerland) |

| 27 May 1939 Friendly | Poland | 3–3 | Belgium | Łódź, Poland |
| 14:00 (UTC+1) | Wilimowski 5', 26'; Wostal 48' | Report | Fievez 42'; Braine 56'; Isemborghs 89' | Stadium: Stadion Miejski; Attendance: 18,000; Referee: Karl Wunderlin (Switzerland) |

| 27 May 1939 Friendly | Poland | 1–1 | Switzerland | Warsaw, Poland |
| 14:00 (UTC+1) | Piątek 29' | Report | Amadò 76' | Stadium: Polish Army Stadium; Attendance: 18,000; Referee: Karl Wunderlin (Switzerland) |

| 27 August 1939 Friendly | Poland | 4–2 | Hungary | Warsaw, Poland |
| 16:30 (UTC+1:00) | Wilimowski 33', 62', 75'; Piątek 74' (pen.) | Report | Zsengellér 14'; Ádám 28' | Stadium: Polish Army Stadium; Attendance: 21,000; Referee: Esko Pekonen (Finland) |

== See also ==
- Poland national football team
