= Polish football in the interwar period =

Football in Poland from 1918 to 1939

The interwar period of Polish football began in the late fall of 1918 after First World War, when Poland regained independence, which had been lost at the end of 18th century (see: Partitions of Poland). The newly created country soon started to organize its administration and several national organizations. Among them was the PZPN – Polski Związek Piłki Nożnej (Polish Football Association), which was created on 20 and 21 December 1919 in Warsaw. According to some sources, several officials representing around 30 Polish Football clubs were then present in Warsaw, but the list of them has been lost.

Many Polish Football clubs were not founded in 1918, but much earlier. The first centers of Polish football were Kraków and Lwów, where a club were established as early as 1903 (Czarni Lwów, the first Polish sports club). However, before 1918 it was impossible to create an independent, uniquely Polish Federation, because Poland as such did not exist.

== Humble beginnings ==
In late 1919, the newly established federation began organizing the first Championships of Poland. This process was complicated because the country's provinces had been divided among three different nations for 123 years, leaving direct rail communication between major cities like Warsaw, Kraków, Lwów, Wilno and Poznań, was virtually non-existent. Additionally, Poland was engaged in multiple regional conflicts, including the Polish–Soviet War, Polish–Ukrainian War, Polish–Lithuanian War, Great Poland Uprising, Silesian Uprisings, Border conflicts between Poland and Czechoslovakia. Due to these events, organizing national sports was secondary to state stabilization.

=== Summer 1920 – unfinished championships ===
In spring of 1920, officials from PZPN decided to organize first championships of the country. Firstly, the Association divided Poland (whose borders were then not yet determined) into five football districts – Warsaw, Kraków, Poznań, Łódź and Lwów. It was planned that in early summer of 1920 teams from these districts would play regional qualifying games and then, five champions would play each other in a central tournament. The last games of championships were supposed to take place some time in late October 1920.

While planning those games, PZPN's officials did not predict that in summer of 1920 Red Army would reach the outskirts of Warsaw, and Poland's fate would be in grave danger (Russian westward offensive of 1918–1919). So, under the circumstances, only Western districts of Kraków and Poznań managed to carry out its games. Kraków's champion was Cracovia, Poznań's – Warta Poznań. Needless to add – Poland national team as such did not yet exist and no international friendlies took place.

== Crucial year – 1921 ==
By mid-1921, the situation in Poland had calmed down. Conflicts were over (see: Peace of Riga) and the nation, while recuperating from all the wars, started to take interest in other activities, including sports. First, in early summer of 1921, teams from five districts played each other, in regional championships. The regional champions were: Cracovia Kraków, ŁKS Łódź, Warta Poznań, Pogoń Lwów and Polonia Warszawa.

=== Cracovia Kraków – first champions ===
During the final, nationwide games of the tournament, Cracovia proved to be the best, unbeaten team. Led by a legendary forward, Józef Kałuża, Kraków's squad won seven games, with only one draw (against Warta). The vice-champion of these historic games was Polonia Warszawa and in third place, Warta Poznań. National championships lasted for only two months, from late August until late October. The top scorer of the national games was Cracovia's forward Józef Kałuża, with 9 goals.

=== First international friendly ===
In late 1921, the freshly created Poland national team also played its first, historic, international friendly. On 18 December 1921 in Budapest, Poland lost to Hungary 0-1.

== Early 1920s ==
Since 1922, Polish teams began regular games in the championships of the country. In the years 1922–1926 the games were organized in the same fashion, as in 1921. First, regional games took place, then best teams would face each other in the national tournament. As Polish borders moved eastwards (Kresy Wschodnie) as well as westwards (Kresy Zachodnie), additional PZPN's districts were added.

In 1922, in a nationwide tournament, 8 teams participated. Five of them were champions of the districts established back in 1920 (these teams were the same as in 1921), plus champions of three new districts – Upper Silesia (Ruch Wielkie Hajduki), Lublin (Wojskowy KS Lublin) and Wilno (Strzelec Wilno).

Also, since 1922, Poland National Team started to play international games on regular basis. Back then, no FIFA World Cup existed, so the only way to prove side's quality were friendlies or Olympic Games.

=== National Championships 1922–1926 – dominance of Pogoń Lwów ===
Starting in 1922, Pogoń Lwów for four successive seasons was champion of Poland, with the exception of 1924. In this year, due to the 1924 Summer Olympics in Paris, no championships were organized. The reason for this was so that the National Team would be adequately prepared for its games in the Olympics.

Pogoń thus was the champion in the years 1922, 1923, 1925 and 1926. Lwów's squad was unequaled in the country, with its leader an excellent athlete, Wacław Kuchar, who in 1922 and 1926 was the top scorer of Poland Another Pogoń star was Mieczysław Batsch – also a forward, who together with Kuchar and some other Lwów's players regularly represented the Poland national team. Apart from Pogoń, in 1922–1926 other important teams were: Wisła Kraków, Warta Poznań, Polonia Warszawa, Cracovia.

In 1925, another district was added to the nationwide games. This time it was Toruń, with its champion, Toruński KS. Thus, by 1927 there were 9 districts of PZPN – Warsaw, Łódź, Poznań, Kraków, Lwów, Lublin, Wilno, Upper Silesia and Toruń. Each of them sent its champion to the national tournament.

=== National Team 1922–1926 – First victory ===
Back in December 1921, just after Hungary vs. Poland friendly, officials from both federations agreed that the next game would take place in Poland. As in early 1920s, Cracovia was regarded as the most influential club, the first international on Polish soil took place on Cracovia's stadium. The Hungarians were allegedly happy with this, as Kraków is in southern Poland, quite close to Budapest.

The game occurred on 14 May 1922. Polish football fans must have been in great anticipation of this event, because they filled up the stadium, with 16,000 of them showing up. Supporters intent on seeing this historic game came not only from Kraków, but also from other parts of the country. They were disappointed – Poland lost to its renowned rival 0-3 but, according to some sources, white-reds did not deserve such harsh punishment.

Two weeks later, Polish team went a long way to Stockholm, to face Sweden. This time, at the Olympic Stadium, with 16,000 spectators, Poland won the first game in its history. The Poles beat their opponents 2–1, with goals by Józef Klotz (on a penalty kick) and Józef Garbień. It must be mentioned, that in 1922 it took almost four days for the Poles to get by trains and ferry from Kraków, via Warsaw, Berlin, Stralsund and Malmö, to the capital of Sweden.

This victory, over an experienced Swedish side, was a turning point for the Poles. The National Team quickly took advantage of it, as more nations showed interest in facing white-reds. On 3 September 1922, in Cernăuţi, Poland tied 1–1 with Romania and on October 1, in Zagreb, Poles beat Yugoslavia 3–1, with two goals by Józef Kałuża.

In 1923, the first game occurred as late as 3 June. In Kraków, the Poles lost 1–2 to Yugoslavia (goal by Kałuża). This goal is also significant – it was the first one scored on home turf. Fans had to wait for next match until 2 September, when in Lwów, on the Czarni Lwów's stadium, Poland tied 1–1 with Romania. Soon after, white-reds traveled north. On September 25 in Helsinki, Poland lost 3–5 to Finland, two days later, in Tallinn, the Poles beat Estonia 4–1. The last game in 1923 took place in Kraków. On 1 November, the Poles tied 2–2 with Sweden.

=== Failure at the 1924 Olympic Games ===
In 1924, all efforts of PZPN were directed towards one aim – the 1924 Summer Olympics in Paris. Due to this fact, games for national championships did not take place, and manager Adam Obrubański was given a free hand in choosing players that would represent the nation in France.

Obrubanski, after scouting some 40 athletes, chose the roster and went to Stockholm, for the last pre-Olympic friendly. On 14 May 1924, Poland was routed by the Swedes 1-5 (goal by Mieczysław Batsch). While the Games were approaching, fans back in Poland were uneasy and their worst expectations turned true.

On arrival at Paris, the Poles learned that they would face Hungary on 26 May 1924 at Stade Bergeyre; a disaster. The white-reds fought hard in the first half, but were down 1-0. After the break, the Poles lost strength and lost 5-0. The Olympic dream was over, Uruguay would take home the gold medal.

=== After the Olympics, National Team until the end of 1926 ===
In spite of defeat in Paris, Polish players learned from their first international tournament. Also, Polish officials got acquainted with United States football officials who came to France with their team. So, on June 10 in Warsaw, Poland faced the United States. This game was another letdown for home fans, as the hosts lost 2–3.

For the rest of the period described (1924–1926), Poland rated poorly, occasionally winning some games against such teams as Estonia, Finland or Turkey, but also losing many, with Hungary, amateur team of Czechoslovakia or Sweden.

The biggest success of these years was the routing of Finland 7–1 on 8 August 1926 in Poznań. Also, on 12 September 1926, Poland beat Turkey 6–1, this game taking place in Lwów. However, those teams were regarded as somehow "second class". Facing tougher opponents, the Poles would most likely lose (like on 1 November 1925, in Kraków, Poland – Sweden 2-6 or on 20 August 1926 in Budapest, Hungary – Poland 4–1). At the end of 1926, Poland went to Scandinavia. On October 3 in Stockholm, the Poles lost to Sweden 3-1 but a week later in Oslo, Poland beat Norway 4–3.

Among players, who would represent the country, the majority of them came from Kraków's clubs, Cracovia and Wisła, Pogoń Lwów, Warta Poznań, Polonia Warszawa and ŁKS Łódź. This means that just like in the early 1920s, the same teams played key roles in Polish football. After Adam Obrubanski, Poland's managers were Tadeusz Kuchar and then Tadeusz Synowiec.

== The late 1920s and early 1930s ==
1927 brought a major change, as the Polish football League was created. The National Team's outlook did not change significantly, without any major achievements and international successes.

=== Creation of the Polish Football League ===
In December 1926 in Warsaw, representatives from several Polish clubs met each other. The purpose of this meeting was simple – to discuss the possibility of creating a Football League. It is unclear who came up with this idea (some say this was due to numerous changes, introduced at that time in Poland, after the May Coup). Obviously, a League was a much more practical solution than hitherto practised two-stage (regional and then central) games.

To the dismay of clubs’ officials, PZPN did not like the idea of the League and the Association wanted to thwart it. However, it turned out that virtually all but one Polish club supported the League and decided to create it, no matter what PZPN's representatives thought of it. In late February 1927, at the PZPN's meeting in Warsaw, its officials openly opposed the League, but the clubs, allegedly egged on by some generals from Polish Army (which, after May Coup of 1926, played a key role in all aspects of public life), would not obey. The creation of the League was announced on March 1, 1927.

=== Cracovia ===
It has been mentioned that all clubs but one supported the League. The only opponent was Cracovia – a very influential and strong organization in Polish Football of the 1920s. Cracovia's boycott was because its director, Dr. Edward Cetnarowski, at the same time held the post of the director of PZPN.

It must be mentioned that Cetnarowski was a personality known not only in Poland, but also in other countries. It was due to his efforts that in September 1923 his beloved club, Cracovia, went on a tour to Spain. The Kraków side's results were impressive – a 1–1 tie with FC Barcelona and a 0–1 loss to Real Madrid. In October, also thanks to Cetnarowski, FC Sevilla came to Kraków and lost 2–3 to Cracovia.

=== Early years of the League - dominance of Wisła Kraków ===
The games of the first, historic League Championships started on April 3, 1927. All major teams (except for Cracovia) took part in it. This is the list of the teams (in the order given below in which the League finished in November 1927):

- Wisła Kraków
- 1. FC Katowice (German-minority team from Katowice)
- Warta Poznań
- Pogoń Lwów
- Legia Warszawa
- Klub Turystow Łódź
- ŁKS Łódź
- Polonia Warszawa
- Czarni Lwów
- Toruński KS Toruń
- Hasmonea Lwów (Jewish-minority team from Lwów)
- Ruch Wielkie Hajduki
- Warszawianka
- Jutrzenka Kraków (Jewish-minority team from Kraków, which finished last and was relegated)

=== Polish-German rivalry symbolized by Wisła Kraków and 1.FC Katowice ===
In this first season of the League, the fight for the Championship was decided between two powerful teams – Wisła Kraków and 1.FC Katowice. This rivalry was treated very seriously, not only by the two sides involved, but also by the whole nation. 1.FC was regarded as the team supported by German minority, while Wisła, at the end of this historic season, represented ambitions of all Poles.

Some time in Autumn 1927 in Katowice, an ill-fated game between 1.FC and Wisła took place. The stakes were very high – the winner would become the Champion. Wisła won 2–0 in Katowice.

=== The League in the years 1928–1932 ===
In 1928 Cracovia finally decided to enter the League, which was gladly accepted by all fans of Football. However, Championships were once again won by Wisła, with such excellent players as Henryk Reyman, Mieczyslaw Balcer and Jan Kotlarczyk. Warta Poznań was second and Legia Warszawa third. This was also the last year of 1.FC's dominance. The team finished fifth, to be relegated forever at the end of 1929 season.

In 1929 yet another team (after Cracovia, Pogoń Lwów and Wisła) was added to the list of Champions of Poland. This time it was Warta Poznań, who finished one point ahead of Garbarnia Kraków.

However, after the last game, on December 1, 1929, it was Garbarnia Kraków that was celebrating the Championship. Two weeks later, in mid-December, PZPN's officials changed the result of the Warta – Klub Turystow Łódź game. Originally, Warta lost 1–2, but due to a walkover (it was decided that one of Łódź's players did not have all necessary documents), this was changed to 3–0 in favor of Poznań's side. As a result of the decision, Warta (with 33 points) became the Champion, Garbarnia finished second with 32 points and Klub Turystow were relegated.

In 1930, Cracovia regained the Championship, (to repeat this success in 1932) and a year later another Kraków side, Garbarnia, won the League. It is clear that the 1927–1932 period was marked by the dominance of teams from Kraków. During this time, only once (Warta Poznań, 1929) the Championship was won by a side from a different city. The 1931 Champion, Garbarnia, was unique as this was the first time that the League had been won by a side whose all players had been bought from other teams.

=== National Team in 1927–1932 ===
In 1927, due to conflict between PZPN and Polish football clubs about the creation of the League, only one international game took place. On June 19, in Bucharest, Poland tied 3–3 with Romania. The new manager, Tadeusz Synowiec, faced a big problem in this match. As most teams refused to send their players, he had to get support almost solely from Cracovia. Kraków's side sent as many as 7 players, the remaining 4 came from Katowice's second-class clubs such as Pogoń Katowice and Policyjny KS. Considering this, the tie with Romania was a good result.

Polish fans had to wait for an international friendly for as long as a year. In June 1928 in Warsaw, Poland tied 3–3 with USA (the Americans came to Europe for Amsterdam's 1928 Summer Olympics), and accepted the offer. By then, the conflict between PZPN and clubs was over, so new manager Tadeusz Kuchar was able to try all the players he wanted. Poland were losing 2-3 until the 89th minute when they were awarded a penalty kick. None of the home players wanted to take the kick until eventually Zygmunt Steuermann, a forward from Jewish-minority team Hasmonea Lwów, stepped forward and scored the equalising goal.

On July 1, for the first time ever, the national team came to Katowice. Poland beat Sweden 2–1, with around 20,000 fans cheering the victory. To please Katowice's fans, Tadeusz Kuchar called up the two best players from 1. FC Katowice – forward Karol Kossok and a very talented defender Erich Heidenreich. The first one gladly accepted the offer and came out on the field, but Heidenreich wrote a letter to PZPN. The player stated that even though he was pleased and honored, he considered himself a German, thus would not play in a white-red jersey. Polish officials were not happy with this (Heidenreich was considered the best defender in the League), but had to comply with his decision.

At the end of 1928, Poland for the first time faced its immediate neighbor and one of Football powerhouses – Czechoslovakia. In Prague, on October 27, white-reds lost 2–3.

In the years 1929–1932 the national team was considered in Europe as a second-class side, which was proved by international authorities in 1929. In 1929–1930, an international competition, The Amateur Central European Cup took place. Poland was included in these games, together with the amateur teams of Hungary, Czechoslovakia and Austria. First, official teams of these nations played in the "real" Central European Cup. This was a clear sign that the European elite did not feel that playing such a weak opponent as Poland was useful. Evidence in support of this came in Budapest, when the Poles were routed 1-5 by the official Hungarian team.

As games against amateur teams are not considered official by FIFA, for several months Poland did not play any official matches. The breakthrough came at the end of September 1930, in Stockholm. The white-reds beat Sweden 3–0, but the hopes of Polish fans, augmented by a 6–0 victory over Latvia (October 1930, Warsaw), faded away on June 14, 1931, also in Poland's capital. On this day, the hosts faced Czechoslovakia, one of the best teams in the world. The Poles were routed 0–4, and the Czechoslovaks scored their first goal as early as in the 30th second.

At the end of the described period, in mid-October 1931, Poland traveled to Brussels, where they lost 1–2 to Belgium. Then, on October 25 in Poznań, the hosts beat Yugoslavia 6–3. This success was the last game of manager Stefan Loth (who died in summer of 1936). Starting in 1932, the national team was managed by former forward of Cracovia, Józef Kałuża, who would lead it to its biggest successes and who would stay on this post until September 1939.

== 1932–1936 ==
The dominance of two early centers of Polish Football – Kraków and Lwów, slowly came to an end. The new manager of the National Team, Józef Kałuża, was a huge fan of teams and players from Polish Upper Silesia (see: Silesian Voivodeship (1920–1939)). Thus, more and more sportsmen from this region appeared in the national lineup, eventually dominating it. Also the League was subject to the reign of Ruch Chorzów. This team won consecutive Championships (1933 to 1936).

=== The Polish Football League 1932–1936 ===
As has been said, the early 1930s marked a decline of the dominance of Kraków and Lwów as centers of Polish Football. The point of gravity slowly moved towards the west – to the Polish part of Upper Silesia, which had belonged to Poland since 1921 (see: Silesian Uprisings). In 1932 the champion was Cracovia, but starting in 1933, Ruch Chorzów (then: Ruch Wielkie Hajduki) completely dominated the league, being the champion for 4 times in a row.

Ruch, with such excellent players as Teodor Peterek, Ernest Wilimowski and Gerard Wodarz was by far the best team in those years. For example, in 1934 it finished seven points ahead of second Cracovia. Other important teams of these years were: Cracovia Kraków, Wisła Kraków, Pogoń Lwów and Warta Poznań.

In 1933 and 1934 there were 12 teams in the League. In 1935 this number was cut to 11 and in 1936 – to 10. Football officials did it on purpose – with fewer teams, the competition was supposed to be harder, which would attract fans to the stadiums. However, supporters’ turnout was not impressive, with Ruch Chorzów as the most popular team, both at home and away.

In late 1935 (the league held its games in the spring-summer-fall system) fans were shocked to find that Cracovia, the legend of this sport, was relegated to the A-class. The Kraków side's absence lasted for a year – it returned in 1937, to become the champion.

=== Early years of Kałuża as a manager ===
Józef Kałuża was one of the best players of the 1910s and 1920s Polish Football. His career in Cracovia started in 1912 and ended in 1931. Then, Kałuża started another job – that of a manager. Firstly, for a short time in Legia Warszawa, then returned to Cracovia. Even though not born in Kraków, he was a great admirer of this city, and there died in October 1944. Kałuża's post as a manager of the National Team was decided on 20–21 February 1932, during the General Meeting of PZPN. There, in the election, he beat the main rival, former star of Pogoń Lwów, Wacław Kuchar.

It must be mentioned that the post of the manager of the National Team of Poland was not well-paid in the 1930s. Clearly, Kałuża's significance was great; he was widely respected, but to support himself, he had to continue working as a teacher in Kraków's high school. Back then, PZPN was not as rich as it is today. The manager was provided with some money to cover costs of travels and accommodation, but this was not regarded a regular salary. Football officials in Poland must have been pleased with Kałuża – unlike his predecessors, who would be rotated after just a few months, he held the seat firmly until the last days of interwar Poland (see: Invasion of Poland).

=== Kałuża's first games ===
Kałuża's debut as Polish coach could not have been better. The new trainer went with his team to Zagreb, to face an always-dangerous team of Yugoslavia. On May 29, 1932, Poland, quite unexpectedly, routed the rivals 3–0. Nobody was expecting this to happen and it was a shock. Then, on July 10 at Warsaw, the white-reds beat 2-0 Sweden and fans realized that under Kałuża, the national team can finally be put together and achieve some successes.

1932 ended with yet more achievements. On October 2, a so-called double match took place (such games were popular in 1930s European Football). The reserve Poland team beat 2-1 Latvia at Warsaw, and at the same hour the first lineup faced Romania in Bucharest. Romania (with several of its starters of Hungarian nationality from Transylvania) was regarded a very strong team. The Poles, however, overwhelmed it 5-0 and this was the biggest success of Polish Football so far.

This game is significant also for another reason. In Polish lineup there were two newcomers from Upper Silesia – Ewald Urban and Gerard Wodarz. Both performed excellently, each scoring a goal. This meant that Kałuża started to notice the Upper Silesians, and after a few years players from there would totally dominate the national team. The remaining three goals were scored by Legia Warszawa's Jozef Nawrot.

=== FIFA World Cup 1934 – unsuccessful qualifier with Czechoslovakia ===
At the beginning of 1933 Polish fans, heady with successes, were full of high hopes and expectations. These feelings were blunted on June 4 at Warsaw, when white-reds were defeated 0-1 by Belgium. This was a huge setback and cold water on heads of some fans.

The game against Belgium was yet another step towards "Silesiazation" of the national team. Apart from Urban and Wodarz, two more players from this region were fielded. These were Edmund Giemsa and Karol Dziwisz. All four were from Ruch Chorzów. Fifth Silesian in the lineup was Karol Pazurek from Pogoń Katowice.

On September 10, 1933, Poland at Warsaw beat Yugoslavia 4–3, but attention of fans already turned on Czechoslovakia. To qualify to the 1934 FIFA World Cup, Poland had to beat its southern neighbors, whose team was regarded as one of the best in the world. The first leg occurred October 15 in Warsaw. The white-reds, after a fierce battle, lost 1-2 (Polish lone goal on a penalty by Legia Warszawa's Henryk Martyna). This was a huge disappointment, and facing the second leg in Prague, nobody believed in success.

At the end of 1933, due to thaw of Polish-German relations, the team headed for Berlin. On December 3 the Germans won 1–0, with the goal in the 89th minute. All throughout winter and early spring of 1934, Football fans were waiting for game with Czechoslovakia, scheduled on April 15. However, just a few days before the match, Polish Ministry of Foreign Affairs banned the team from traveling to Prague, due to tense situation between two neighbors. As a result, the Czechoslovaks qualified and during the World Cup in Italy proved their skills, becoming the runner-up.

=== 1934–1936 Years marked by rising fame of Ernest Wilimowski ===
Soon after events of April 1934, the team traveled by train on a tournee to Scandinavia. From Katowice, via Berlin, they went to Copenhagen, where on May 21 the Poles lost 2–4 to Denmark. Two days later, at Stockholm, white-reds faced Sweden, also losing 2–4. These games are important for one reason. Match against Denmark was the debut of a 17-year-old Ernest Wilimowski. The young forward of Ruch Chorzów was a rising star, which was proven in Stockholm, where "Ezi" scored a goal.

The remaining games of the described period were not marked by any significant achievements. Poland lost several prestigious games (2-5 vs Germany in Warsaw, 1-4 vs. Jugoslavia in Belgrad, 1-4 vs. Romania in Bucharest or 2-5 vs. Austria in Wien). The team plunged into mediocrity, winning only 6–3 with Latvia and 1–0 with Austria (on October 6, 1935, at Warsaw, lone goal by Pogoń Lwów's Michał Matyas). This game was the only notable success of the 1934 – early 1936 period. Wilimowski played in some of these matches, but the young player needed time to establish his position.

== 1936 Olympic Games in Berlin ==
Olympic experiences of Polish football team were by 1936 few and far between. In 1920 Summer Olympics, at Antwerp, white-reds did not participate, due to Polish–Soviet War. In 1924 at Paris, Poland was routed 0-5 by Hungary. As a result of this failure, the team did not even bother itself to travel to the 1928 Summer Olympics in Amsterdam. Then, 1932 Summer Olympics in Los Angeles were too far away and too expensive for Polish football officials.

Morale among both fans and officials was at the beginning of 1936 very low. Newspapers were urging PZPN to fire Kałuża, but eventually this did not happen, as the coach was strongly supported by representatives from Upper Silesia – the strongest and richest district of PZPN.

Even though 1936 Olympics were to be held in the neighboring capital, not everyone in Poland favored the idea of National Team's participation in this event. Officials from both Kraków and Lwów rejected it, only to be convinced by an unexpected victory 2–0 over Belgium (February 16, 1936, Brussels). This was a good sign, which changed the general feelings.

In mid-June 1936, after a long discussion, PZPN officially permitted the National Team to participate in the Games. Kałuża did not have time – he quickly organized a training camp in Warsaw, calling 36 players. After a while this number was cut down to 25 and then – to 18. Among them was Ernest Wilimowski, who was regarded by the manager as a key player, essential for his plans.

A few weeks before the games, "Ezi" was disqualified for alleged excessive drinking and did not go to Berlin. This was a huge mistake of Polish officials. They recklessly got rid of a top forward, thus reducing Poland's chances for a medal. Józef Kałuża had to agree with the decision, but obviously he was very unhappy. Without Wilimowski in the lineup, white-reds lost most of their firepower.

=== Games vs. Hungary, Great Britain and Austria ===
1936 Summer Olympics was the second (after 1924 Summer Olympics) major international tournament in which the Poles participated. Considering this fact, it is understandable that both officials and players were nervous before stepping onto the field for the first game. The opponent was the amateur team of Hungary.

On August 5 at Berlin's Post-Stadion the white-reds faced Hungary. The opponents, obeying the regulations, fielded their amateur players. With Poland, the situation was more complicated. Officially, there were not any football professionals in the country. All players worked somewhere on a daily basis, so as such they were amateurs. In some cases however, these jobs were just covers and all some athletes did was playing. Thus, Polish lineup consisted of its best players from top League teams. Also, it must be mentioned that games against Hungary, Great Britain and Austria are not considered by FIFA as official, so they simply do not count in any statistics.

Poland won the first game with ease, beating the Hungarians 3-0 (two goals by Hubert Gad, one by Gerard Wodarz). Then, white-reds faced amateurs from Great Britain. This was a tougher opponent, but again – no players from English or Scottish professional teams were fielded. The only athlete who eventually turned pro was Bernard Joy, later representing Arsenal London. This game, which took place on August 8, was a show of two players – Gerard Wodarz (who scored 3 goals, with additional strikes by Hubert Gad and Ryszard Piec) and Joy, who netted twice. Poland won 5–4, but the match was very nail-biting. It is enough to say that at some point the Poles were winning 5–1, only then to let 3 goals. Fortunately, the British did not have enough time to tie.

Then, on August 11, at Berlin Olympic Stadium, in the semifinal Poland faced amateur team of Austria. Stakes were high, as the winner would qualify to the final. Perhaps because of this, white-reds were nervous and did not play their part, losing 1-3 (lone goal by Hubert Gad). Huge crowd of 80,000 was very partisan, supporting Austria, which also was a disadvantage. Chance of Olympic gold was missed.

=== The match against Norway ===
After losing to Austria, the Poles had to content themselves with the game for the bronze medal. This time, for unknown reasons, Norway fielded its first lineup, so this match is regarded as an official international game.

The angry Polish officials decided to punish some players, claiming they did not play hard enough against Austria, so the starting roster was much different. It did not help much, as morale in the team was very low. The white-reds scored the first goal (scored by Gerard Wodarz), then the opponents answered with two from Arne Brustad. Poland managed to tie (with Teodor Peterek scoring), only to let Brustad score his third goal of the day. Norway won 3-2 thus receiving bronze medals.

== 1936–1939: the last years of interwar Poland ==
During the period described, the National Team slowly recovered from the Olympic failure, eventually managing to qualify for the 1938 FIFA World Cup (see: Poland at 1938 FIFA World Cup). In the last game of interwar Poland, the white-reds in Warsaw beat 4-2 Hungary (see: The Last Game (August 27, 1939)). This was the biggest success of Polish football in the years 1918–1939.

According to some experts, had the Second World War not started, Poland would have achieved success in the planned 1942 FIFA World Cup, which was supposed to take place either in Brazil or Argentina. Manager Józef Kałuża had gathered a group of excellent, prospective players, with Ernest Wilimowski as the top star. Kałuża had plans and vision; however, on September 1, 1939, it all changed forever. Poland ceased to exist, only to return to the map of Europe in 1945. By then, however, the situation was radically different.

=== Polish Football League 1936–1939 ===
Ruch Chorzów was still the dominant team, winning the Championships in 1936 and 1938. In 1937 Ruch's streak of four consecutive champions was broken by Cracovia, and in 1939 the championships were not finished. By August 31, 1939, after some 12 games, Ruch was the leader of the 10-team League. Last games of this summer occurred on August 20. Then, a break was planned, because the National Team was going to play a few international friendlies. Games were to be re-introduced on September 10.

As a result of the Second World War, borders of Poland changed significantly. Lwów, one of the centers of Polish football (with such teams as Pogoń Lwów, Czarni Lwów and Lechia Lwów) was annexed by The Soviet Union and all these teams ceased to exist. Lwów's football officials and players moved westwards, creating such clubs as Polonia Bytom, Odra Opole and Pogoń Szczecin (see: Recovered Territories). Another important center, Wilno (with the team Śmigły Wilno), was also annexed by the Soviets (see: Polish areas annexed by the Soviet Union).

This is the list of the ten teams that participated in the games for the last Championships of interwar Poland. Teams are presented according to their position on the table, as of August 31, 1939:

1. Ruch Chorzów

2. Wisła Kraków

3. Pogoń Lwów

4. AKS Chorzów

5. Warta Poznań

6. Cracovia

7. Polonia Warszawa

8. Garbarnia Kraków

9. Warszawianka

10. Union Touring Łódź

=== The national Team in 1936–37 ===
Both players and manager Kałuża did not have much time to recuperate and analyze the Olympics. League teams were waiting for their key players, and less than a month after the Berlin game vs. Norway, Poland played in another double match. On September 6, 1936, the reserve team faced Latvia in Riga, on the same day the first team went to Belgrad, to play Yugoslavia. Both matches were highly unsuccessful. In Riga, Polish second team tied 3–3 with a much-weaker opponent. However, the game in Belgrade was a real disaster. After a very poor performance, the visitors lost 3-9 (two goals by Teodor Peterek, one by Gerard Wodarz), which was a clear sign of athletic and personal slump of Polish team.

For the next months Poland was struggling to recover from this drubbing. The White-reds did not manage to beat Germany (1-1, Warsaw, September 13, 1936) or Denmark (1-2, Copenhagen, October 4, 1936, in this game Ernest Wilimowski finally returned to the team). The first signs of improvement appeared in mid-1937. On June 23 in Warsaw Poland beat Sweden 3–1, only to lose 2–4 to Romania a few days later (July 4, Łódź). A crucial game occurred on September 12, 1937, in Warsaw. The hosts beat Denmark 3-1 which brought hope and eventually started a series of great games, climaxing during the 1938 FIFA World Cup. Match after match, the performance of Polish players improved. Results were impressive.

Firstly, in a World Cup qualifier at Warsaw (see: Poland at 1938 FIFA World Cup), Poland beat Yugoslavia 4-0 (October 10, 1937). Interesting is the fact that all goals were scored by players from Chorzów's clubs – Leonard Piątek (2), Ernest Wilimowski and Gerard Wodarz. Manager Kałuża betted on players from Polish Upper Silesia (seven of them appeared in the lineup) and was not disappointed. On the same day in Katowice the reserve team beat 2-1 Latvia. These games were a huge boost for the Poles.

Winter break was marked by a great level of optimism, and quality of Polish team was assured by the invitation from then very strong team of Switzerland. White-reds faced the Swiss on March 13, 1938, in Zürich, to achieve a 3–3 tie. Again – all goals were scored by players from Chorzów (Wilimowski, Piatek, Jerzy Wostal). Also, in the lineup there were as many as eight Upper Silesians, which was a clear proof of this region's dominance in Polish football.

In spring of 1938, just before the World Cup, the Poles were in their best shape. This was proven on May 23 in Warsaw, when the hosts, playing in front of 25,000 fans, routed Ireland 6–0. This match is regarded as one of the best performances of the interwar period. Apart from Wilimowski, who again showed his extraordinary skills and scored once, virtually all players gave their all. Out of them, one has to single out the scorers – Jan Wasiewicz, Leonard Piątek (2) and Gerard Wodarz. The game against Ireland was the last friendly before World Cup. It raised moral.

=== 1938 FIFA World Cup ===
It is enough to say that Poles, after a game (and show by Ernest Wilimowski) lost 5–6 to Brazil, which automatically eliminated them from the tournament.

Also, it is worth mentioning that seven starters (Ernest Wilimowski, Wilhelm Góra, Ewald Dytko, Gerard Wodarz, Leonard Piątek, Erwin Nyc and Ryszard Piec) were from Upper Silesia (see: Autonomous Silesian Voivodeship). Out of remaining four, three (Edward Madejski, Antoni Gałecki and Władysław Szczepaniak) came from Polish heartland and the last one, Fryderyk Scherfke, was an ethnic German from Poznań.

=== Last months of interwar Poland ===
After the loss to Brazil, the Poles needed time to recuperate and rethink the tactics. The next friendly occurred three months later, on September 18, 1938. In Chemnitz, the Germans beat their visitors 4-1 (goal by Teodor Peterek). Compared to the Strasbourg match, there was only one change in the lineup – forward Fryderyk Scherfke was replaced by Peterek. According to witnesses, Poland played a good game, but missed countless good opportunities. Germans, however, netted all their chances.

A week later, on September 25, in a double game, the first team faced Yugoslavia in Warsaw (4-4, goals by Józef Korbas, Ernest Wilimowski – 2 and Leonard Piątek), and reserves went to Riga, where they lost 1–2 to Latvia. This was a surprising defeat, but the worst was yet to come.

In the next five games Poland did not manage to beat their opponents. Firstly, on October 23 in Warsaw, the hosts tied 2–2 with Norway (goals by Wilimowski and Ryszard Piec). Then, in late November, white-reds went on a long train and ferry journey to Dublin, where they lost 2–3 to Ireland (goals by Wilimowski and Piatek).

The first game of 1939 was a disaster. On January 22, at Paris's Parc des Princes, the French routed Poland 4–0. It must be mentioned that January is the time of winter break in Polish Football League, so the players were completely unprepared for this game. However, Polish officials did not want to refuse invitation from their French counterparts, and thus the match turned out really badly for white-reds. In freezing rain, hosts were faster and stronger and ambitious Poles were no match to them.

On May 27, 1939, in Łódź, Poland faced Belgium. This time again the white-reds did not manage to win, achieving a 3–3 tie (two goals by Wilimowski, one by Jerzy Wostal). Also on June 4 in Warsaw, facing Switzerland, the hosts tied 1-1, with Poland's lone goal by Piatek.

The last game of interwar Poland took place August 27, 1939 in Warsaw. Hosts faced Hungary, beating them 4–2. This was the day of Ernest Wilimowski, who scored 3 goals and set up the 4th one. The game is described here: The last game: August 27, 1939. Poland – Hungary 4-2.

On September 3, also in Warsaw, Poland was going to face Bulgaria. Three days later, white-reds were supposed to travel to Belgrade, to play Yugoslavia. These games never took place. On September 1, 1939, Germany invaded Poland (see: Invasion of Poland). Then, on September 17, Soviet Union joined the Nazis (see: Molotov–Ribbentrop Pact). Poland disappeared from the map of Europe, and the occupiers banned Poles from practising any sports.

== See also ==
- President of Poland's Football Cup (1936–1939)
- Lower Level Football Leagues in Interwar Poland
- Polish Football League 1927–1939
