= List of Poland national football team hat-tricks =

This page is a list of hat-tricks scored by the Poland national football team. Since Poland's first official international game on 18 December 1921 against Hungary, there have been 45 recorded hat-tricks. The first national hat-trick was scored by Zygmunt Steuermann against Turkey in an international friendly. The most goals scored by an individual in a single match is 5, achieved by both Ernest Pohl and Włodzimierz Lubański.

The record for most hat-tricks scored for Polish national football team is seven, a record held by Robert Lewandowski. The team which Poland have scored the most hat-tricks against is Finland, scoring five different hat-tricks against them. Three poles have scored hat-tricks at the FIFA World Cup: Ernst Wilimowski against Brazil in 1938; Andrzej Szarmach against Haiti in 1974 and Zbigniew Boniek against Belgium in 1982.

Poland have conceded 22 hat-tricks in total, with Sweden and Yugoslavia both scoring three. The most goals scored by an individual in a single game is four, a record jointly held by Blagoje Marjanović, Jovan Jezerkić, Ferenc Deák and Raman Vasilyuk. There have been three hat-tricks scored against Poland at the World Cup: Leônidas at the 1938 FIFA World Cup; Gary Lineker at the 1986 FIFA World Cup and Pauleta at the 2002 FIFA World Cup.

== Hat-tricks scored by Poland ==
Scores and results list Poland's goal tally first.

| No. | Player | Date | Opponent | Venue | Goals | Result | Competition | Ref. |
|---|---|---|---|---|---|---|---|---|
| 1 | Zygmunt Steuermann | 12 September 1926 | Turkey | Warsaw, Poland | 3 – (50', 68', 71') | 6–1 | Friendly | |
| 2 | Wawrzyniec Staliński | 8 August 1926 | Finland | Poznań, Poland | 3 – (9', 60', 72') | 7–1 | Friendly | |
| 3 | Mieczysław Batsch | 8 August 1926 | Finland | Poznań, Poland | 4 – (33' pen, 44', 77', 90') | 7–1 | Friendly | |
| 4 | Józef Nawrot | 26 October 1930 | Latvia | Polish Army Stadium, Warsaw, Poland | 4 – (11', 28', 71', 89') | 6–0 | Friendly | |
| 5 | Mieczysław Balcer | 25 October 1931 | Yugoslavia | Edmund Szyc Stadium, Poznań, Poland | 3 – (4', 12', 51') | 6–3 | Friendly | |
| 6 | Józef Nawrot (2) | 2 October 1932 | Romania | Stadionul Republicii, Bucharest, Romania | 3 – (8', 25', 78') | 5–0 | Friendly | |
| 7 | Gerard Wodarz | 14 October 1934 | Latvia | Jānis Skredelis' Stadium, Riga, Latvia | 3 – (14', 64', 75') | 6–2 | Friendly | |
| 8 | Gerard Wodarz (2) | 8 August 1936 | Great Britain | Poststadion, Berlin, Germany | 3 – (43', 48', 53') | 5–4 | 1936 Summer Olympics | |
| 9 | Józef Korbas | 12 September 1937 | Bulgaria | Yunak Stadium, Sofia, Bulgaria | 3 – (4', 72', 74') | 3–3 | Friendly | |
| 10 | Ernst Willimowski | 5 June 1938 | Brazil | Stade de la Meinau, Strasbourg, France | 4 – (53', 59', 89', 118') | 5–6 | 1938 FIFA World Cup | |
| 11 | Ernst Willimowski (2) | 27 August 1939 | Hungary | Polish Army Stadium, Warsaw, Poland | 3 – (33', 62', 75') | 4–2 | Friendly | |
| 12 | Gerard Cieślik | 14 May 1950 | Romania | Olympic Stadium, Wrocław, Poland | 3 – (18', 25', 76') | 3–3 | Friendly | |
| 13 | Ernest Pohl | 28 October 1956 | Norway | 10th-Anniversary Stadium, Warsaw, Poland | 4 – (6', 11', 38', 90') | 5–3 | Friendly | |
| 14 | Edward Jankowski | 5 July 1957 | Finland | Olympic Stadium, Helsinki, Finland | 3 – (19', 55', 64') | 3–1 | 1958 FIFA World Cup qualification | |
| 15 | Ernest Pohl (2) | 26 August 1960 | Tunisia | Stadio Flaminio, Rome, Italy | 5 | 6–1 | 1960 Summer Olympics | |
| 16 | Ernest Pohl (3) | 5 November 1961 | Denmark | Silesian Stadium, Chorzów, Poland | 3 – (21', 48', 90' pen) | 5–0 | Friendly | |
| 17 | Włodzimierz Lubański | 24 October 1965 | Finland | Florian Krygier Municipal Stadium, Szczecin, Poland | 4 – (19', 21', 24', 41') | 7–0 | 1996 FIFA World Cup qualification | |
| 18 | Janusz Żmijewski | 8 October 1967 | Belgium | Heysel Stadium, Brussels, Belgium | 3 – (25', 52', 70') | 2–4 | UEFA Euro 1968 qualifying | |
| 19 | Eugeniusz Faber | 24 April 1968 | Turkey | Silesian Stadium, Chorzów, Poland | 3 – (5', 55', 63') | 8–0 | Friendly | |
| 20 | Włodzimierz Lubański (2) | 24 April 1968 | Turkey | Silesian Stadium, Chorzów, Poland | 3 – (10', 46', 75') | 8–0 | Friendly | |
| 21 | Andrzej Jarosik | 9 June 1968 | Norway | Ullevaal Stadion, Oslo, Norway | 3 – (21', 38', 55') | 6–1 | Friendly | |
| 22 | Włodzimierz Lubański (3) | 20 April 1969 | Luxembourg | Stadion Miejsk, Kraków, Poland | 5 – (9', 20', 36', 82' pen, 86') | 8–1 | 1970 FIFA World Cup qualification | |
| 23 | Joachim Marx | 2 September 1970 | Denmark | 10th-Anniversary Stadium, Warsaw, Poland | 3 – (59', 61', 81') | 5–0 | Friendly | |
| 24 | Włodzimierz Lubański (4) | 22 September 1971 | Turkey | Stadion Miejsk, Kraków, Poland | 3 – (62', 73', 90') | 5–1 | UEFA Euro 1972 qualifying | |
| 25 | Robert Gadocha | 28 August 1972 | Colombia | Ingolstadt, Germany | 3 | 5–1 | 1972 Summer Olympics | |
| 26 | Włodzimierz Lubański (5) | 20 March 1973 | United States | ŁKS Stadium, Łódź, Poland | 3 – (17', 24', 84') | 4–0 | Friendly | |
| 27 | Andrzej Szarmach | 19 June 1974 | Haiti | Olympiastadion, Munich, Germany | 3 – (30', 34', 50') | 4–0 | 1974 FIFA World Cup | |
| 28 | Kazimierz Deyna | 26 March 1975 | United States | Edmund Szyc Stadium, Poznań, Poland | 3 – (32', 67', 71') | 7–0 | Friendly | |
| 29 | Grzegorz Lato | 6 July 1975 | Canada | Autostade, Montreal, Canada | 3 – (40', 71', 89') | 8–1 | Friendly | |
| 30 | Andrzej Iwan | 9 July 1980 | Colombia | Estadio El Campín, Bogotá, Colombia | 3 – (10', 16', 32') | 4–1 | Friendly | |
| 31 | Zbigniew Boniek | 28 June 1982 | Belgium | Camp Nou, Barcelona, Spain | 3 – (4', 26', 54') | 3–0 | 1982 FIFA World Cup | |
| 32 | Andrzej Juskowiak | 7 October 1997 | Moldova | Republican Stadium, Chișinău, Moldova | 3 – (23', 56', 60') | 3–0 | 1998 FIFA World Cup qualification | |
| 33 | Radosław Kałużny | 7 October 2000 | Belarus | Widzew Łódź Stadium, Łódź, Poland | 3 – (24', 63', 74') | 3–1 | 2002 FIFA World Cup qualification | |
| 34 | Paweł Kryszałowicz | 21 February 2004 | Faroe Islands | Estadio Iberoamericano, San Fernando, Spain | 4 – (9', 40', 41', 43') | 6–0 | Friendly | |
| 35 | Tomasz Frankowski | 26 March 2005 | Azerbaijan | Polish Army Stadium, Warsaw, Poland | 3 – (12', 63', 66') | 8–0 | 2006 FIFA World Cup qualification | |
| 36 | Ebi Smolarek | 13 October 2007 | Kazakhstan | Polish Army Stadium, Warsaw, Poland | 3 – (56', 65', 66') | 3–1 | UEFA Euro 2008 qualifying | |
| 37 | Ebi Smolarek (2) | 1 April 2009 | San Marino | Stadion Miejski, Kielce, Poland | 4 – (18', 60', 72', 81') | 10–0 | 2010 FIFA World Cup qualification | |
| 38 | Robert Lewandowski | 7 September 2014 | Gibraltar | Estádio Algarve, Faro-Loulé, Portugal | 4 – (50', 53', 86', 92') | 7–0 | UEFA Euro 2016 qualifying | |
| 39 | Robert Lewandowski (2) | 13 June 2015 | Georgia | Stadion Narodowy, Warsaw, Poland | 3 – (89', 92', 93') | 4–0 | UEFA Euro 2016 qualifying | |
| 40 | Robert Lewandowski (3) | 8 October 2016 | Denmark | Stadion Narodowy, Warsaw, Poland | 3 – (20', 36' pen, 48') | 3–2 | 2018 FIFA World Cup qualification | |
| 41 | Robert Lewandowski (4) | 10 June 2017 | Romania | Stadion Narodowy, Warsaw, Poland | 3 – (29' pen, 57', 62' pen) | 3–1 | 2018 FIFA World Cup qualification | |
| 42 | Robert Lewandowski (5) | 5 October 2017 | Armenia | Vazgen Sargsyan Republican Stadium, Yerevan, Armenia | 3 – (18', 25', 64') | 6–1 | 2018 FIFA World Cup qualification | |
| 43 | Robert Lewandowski (6) | 10 October 2019 | Latvia | Daugava Stadium, Riga, Latvia | 3 – (9', 13', 76') | 3–0 | UEFA Euro 2020 qualifying | |
| 44 | Kamil Grosicki | 7 October 2020 | Finland | Gdańsk Stadium, Gdańsk, Poland | 3 – (9', 18', 38') | 5–1 | Friendly | |
| 45 | Adam Buksa | 5 September 2021 | San Marino | San Marino Stadium, Serravalle, San Marino | 3 – (67', 92', 94') | 7–1 | 2022 FIFA World Cup qualification | |
| 46 | Robert Lewandowski (7) | 2 October 2026 | Romania | Stadion Narodowy, Warsaw, Latvia | 3 – (24', 47', 86') | 6–0 | 2026–27 UEFA Nations League B | |

== Hat-tricks conceded by Poland ==
Scores and results list Poland's goal tally first.

| No. | Player | Date | Opponent | Venue | Goals | Result | Competition | Ref. |
|---|---|---|---|---|---|---|---|---|
| 1 | Sven Rydell | 18 May 1924 | Sweden | Stockholm Olympic Stadium, Stockholm, Sweden | 3 – (6', 61', 83') | 1–5 | Friendly | |
| 2 | Filip Johansson | 1 November 1925 | Sweden | Stadion Cracovii, Kraków, Poland | 3 – (25', 28', 30') | 2–6 | Friendly | |
| 3 | Tore Keller | 23 May 1934 | Sweden | Stockholm Olympic Stadium, Stockholm, Sweden | 3 – (36', 70', 74') | 2–4 | Friendly | |
| 4 | Branislav Sekulić | 26 August 1934 | Yugoslavia | Stadion SK Jugoslavija, Belgrade, Serbia | 3 – (24', 42', 51') | 1–4 | Friendly | |
| 5 | Arne Brustad | 13 August 1936 | Norway | Olympiastadion, Berlin, Germany | 3 – (15', 21', 84') | 2–3 | 1936 Summer Olympics | |
| 6 | Blagoje Marjanović | 6 September 1936 | Yugoslavia | Belgrade, Serbia | 4 – (3', 19', 44', 75') | 3–9 | Friendly | |
| 7 | Leônidas | 5 June 1938 | Brazil | Stade de la Meinau, Strasbourg, France | 3 – (18', 93', 104') | 5–6 | 1938 FIFA World Cup | |
| 8 | Josef Gauchel | 18 September 1938 | Germany | Großkampfbahn, Chemnitz, Germany | 3 – (35', 59', 62') | 1–4 | Friendly | |
| 9 | Jovan Jezerkić | 19 October 1947 | Yugoslavia | Belgrade, Serbia | 4 – (10', 20', 21', 28') | 1–7 | Friendly | |
| 10 | Karl Aage Præst | 26 June 1948 | Denmark | Idrætsparken, Copenhagen, Denmark | 3 – (39', 73', 88') | 0–8 | Friendly | |
| 11 | Ferenc Deák | 10 July 1949 | Hungary | Debrecen, Hungary | 4 – (25', 45', 51', 62') | 2–8 | Friendly | |
| 12 | Gyula Szilágyi | 4 June 1950 | Hungary | Polish Army Stadium, Warsaw, Poland | 3 – (38', 48', 62') | 2–5 | Friendly | |
| 13 | Vlastimil Preis | 22 October 1950 | Czechoslovakia | Polish Army Stadium, Warsaw, Poland | 3 – (13', 32', 44') | 1–4 | Friendly | |
| 14 | Mircea Dridea | 30 August 1959 | Romania | 10th-Anniversary Stadium, Warsaw Poland | 3 – (26', 45', 55') | 2–3 | Friendly | |
| 15 | Viktor Ponedelnik | 19 May 1960 | Soviet Union | Central Lenin Stadium, Moscow, Russia | 3 – (14', 86', 90') | 1–7 | Friendly | |
| 16 | Paolo Barison | 1 November 1965 | Italy | Stadio Olimpico, Rome, Italy | 3 – (25', 65', 87') | 1–6 | 1996 FIFA World Cup qualification | |
| 17 | Gary Lineker | 11 June 1986 | England | Estadio Tecnológico, Monterrey, Mexico | 3 – (9', 14', 34') | 0–3 | 1986 FIFA World Cup | |
| 18 | Peter Stöger | 17 May 1994 | Austria | GKS Katowice Stadium, Chorzów, Poland | 3 – (5', 26', 64') | 3–4 | Friendly | |
| 19 | Paul Scholes | 27 March 1999 | England | Wembley Stadium, London, England | 3 – (11', 23', 71') | 1–3 | UEFA Euro 2000 qualifying | |
| 20 | Raman Vasilyuk | 5 September 2001 | Belarus | Dinamo Stadium, Minsk, Belarus | 4 – (8', 46', 52', 62') | 1–4 | 2002 FIFA World Cup qualification | |
| 21 | Pauleta | 10 June 2002 | Portugal | Jeonju World Cup Stadium, Jeonju, South Korea | 3 – (14', 65', 77') | 0–4 | 2002 FIFA World Cup | |
| 22 | Peter Madsen | 18 August 2004 | Denmark | Poznań Stadium, Poznań, Poland | 3 – (23', 30', 91') | 1–5 | Friendly | |
