= 1923 in Polish football =

Football in Poland
- Season: 1923

- Poland national team
- Friendly

The 1923 season was the 4th season of competitive football in Poland.

== National teams ==
=== Poland national team ===
3 June 1923 Friendly	Poland	1–2	Yugoslavia	Stadion Cracovii, Kraków
	Kałuża 49'	Report	Perška 16'; Zinaja 86'	Attendance: 13,000; Referee: Heinrich Retschury (Austria)

2 September 1923 Friendly	Poland	1–1	Romania	Stadion im. Marszałka Józefa Piłsudskiego, Lwów
	Kuchar 16'	Report	Guga 38'	Attendance: 10,000; Referee: Carl Koppehel (Germany)

23 September 1923 Friendly	Finland	5–3	Poland	Töölön Pallokenttä, Helsinki
	Eklöf 15', 37'; Linna 23'; Korma 60', 70'	Report	Staliński 37', 80'; Müller 83'	Attendance: 3,000; Referee: August Silber-Sillak (Estonia)

25 September 1923 Friendly	Estonia	1–4	Poland	Kalevi Staadion, Tallinn
	Joll 86'	Report	Batsch 20'; Kowalski 38', 65'; Staliński 77'	Attendance: 4,000; Referee: Verner Eklöf (Finland)

1 November 1923 Friendly	Poland	2–2	Sweden	Stadion Cracovii, Kraków
	Staliński 7', 49'	Report	Dahl 15'; Helgesson 78'	Attendance: 10,000; Referee: Imre Vértes (Hungary)
