= 1922 in Polish football =

Football in Poland
- Season: 1922

- Poland national team
- Friendly

The 1922 season was the 3rd season of competitive football in Poland.

Józef Klotz scored the first-ever goal for the Poland national football team. He scored it against Sweden in Stockholm in May 1922, in the team's third international match.

== National teams ==
=== Poland national team ===
14 May 1922 Friendly	Poland	0–3	Hungary	Stadion Cracovii, Kraków
		Report	Seiden 6'; Solti 44', 81'	Attendance: 16,000; Referee: Emil Grätz (Czechoslovakia)

28 May 1922 Friendly	Sweden	1–2	Poland	Stockholm Olympic Stadium, Stockholm
	Svedberg 56'	Report	Klotz 27' (pen.); Garbień 74'	Attendance: 16,142; Referee: Hugo Meisl (Austria)

3 September 1922 Friendly	Romania	1–1	Poland	Stadionul Maccabi, Cernăuți
	Kozovits 63'	Report	Duźniak 20'	Attendance: 6,000; Referee: Hans Schmidt (Austria)

1 October 1922 Friendly	Yugoslavia	1–3	Poland	Stadion HAŠK, Zagreb
	Vinek 35'	Report	Kałuża 8', 57'; Garbień 74'	Attendance: 4,000; Referee: Heinrich Retschury (Austria)
