= Synowiec =

Synowiec is a surname of Polish origin. Notable people with the surname include:

- Ludwik Synowiec (1958–2022), Polish ice hockey player
- Tadeusz Synowiec (1889–1960), Polish footballer, coach, and journalist
