= Tadeusz Kuchar =

Polish athlete and sports official

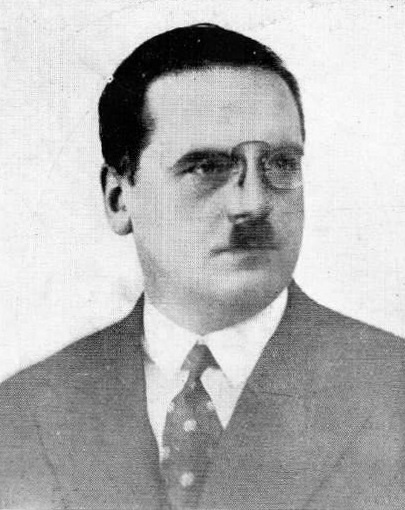
- Tadeusz Kuchar in 1924

Personal information
- Full name: Tadeusz Kuchar
- Date of birth: 13 April 1891
- Place of birth: Kraków, Austria-Hungary
- Date of death: 5 April 1966 (aged 74)
- Place of death: Warsaw, Poland
- Position: Midfielder

Senior career*
| Years | Team | Apps | (Gls) |
- Pogoń Lwów

Managerial career
- 1923: Poland
- 1925: Poland
- 1928: Poland
- * Club domestic league appearances and goals

Tadeusz Kuchar (13 April 1891, in Kraków – 5 April 1966, in Warsaw) was a Polish athlete, footballer, swimmer, ice-skater, skier, sports official. Born into a sporting family, he was the brother of Wacław Kuchar.

For most of his life he was strongly connected with the Pogoń Lwów football club, where he played midfield. He was a co-founder of the Polish Olympic Committee. Occasionally, in the years 1923, 1925 and 1928 he served as the coach of the Poland national team. He was also the first director of the Polish Track and Field Association and in 1945-1946 was the director of the Polish Football Association.

He fought in World War I in Austro-Hungarian artillery. He fought in the Polish-Ukrainian War and the Polish-Soviet War as an artillery officer. He retired from the military with the rank of major. He retained his rank despite the communist takeover of Poland.

Sporting positions
| Preceded by (Poland) Józef Lustgarten alongside Adam Obrubański and Stanisław Ziemiański | Poland National Team Coach; 3 June 1923 – 1 November 1923 | Succeeded by (Poland) Adam Obrubański |
| Preceded by (Poland) Adam Obrubański | Poland National Team Coach; 19 July 1925 | Succeeded by (Poland) Tadeusz Synowiec |
| Preceded by (Poland) Tadeusz Synowiec | Poland National Team Coach; 10 June 1928 | Succeeded by (Poland) Stefan Loth |
