= Hubert Gad =

Polish footballer (1914–1939)

Personal information
- Full name: Hubert August Gad
- Date of birth: 15 August 1914
- Place of birth: Świętochłowice, German Empire
- Date of death: 3 July 1939 (aged 24)
- Place of death: Świętochłowice, Poland
- Position: Striker

Senior career*
Years	Team	Apps	(Gls)
1928–1939	Śląsk Świętochłowice		

International career
1936–1937	Poland	6	(2)
- * Club domestic league appearances and goals

Hubert August Gad, also known as Hubert God (15 August 1914 – 3 July 1939), was a Polish footballer who played as a striker.

Born in Świętochłowice, Gad represented both Śląsk Świętochłowice and the Poland national team. He made his international debut on 16 February 1936 at Heysel Stadium in Brussels, against Belgium. His debut was excellent, as Gad scored a goal and Poland won 2–0.

During the 1936 Summer Olympic Games in Berlin, he was a key player on the team. Gad, who was regarded as a temporary replacement for Ernest Wilimowski, proved his excellent quality, scoring four goals in the tournament. After the Olympics, represented Poland in additional 4 games, scoring once.

Gad died in 1939 while swimming in a lake. His funeral took place on 9 July 1939, and among pallbearers were renowned footballers such as Leonard Piątek, Ryszard Piec, Ewald Dytko and Teodor Peterek.
