= Tadeusz Synowiec =

Polish footballer, coach, and journalist

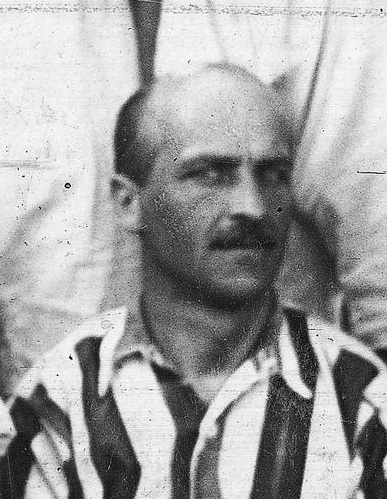
- Synowiec in 1921

Personal information
- Date of birth: 11 November 1889
- Place of birth: Świątniki Górne, Austria-Hungary
- Date of death: 7 November 1960 (aged 70)
- Place of death: Kędzierzyn-Koźle, Poland
- Height: 1.80 m (5 ft 11 in)
- Position: Midfielder

Senior career*
Years	Team	Apps	(Gls)
–1909	RKS Rudawa		
1909–1914	Cracovia		
1914–1917	PTG Kijów		
1918–1925	Cracovia		

International career
1921–1924	Poland	8	(0)

Managerial career
- 1913: Galicia
- 1925–1927: Poland
- * Club domestic league appearances and goals

Tadeusz Synowiec (11 November 1889 – 7 November 1960) was a Polish footballer who played as a midfielder. A graduate of Kraków’s Jagiellonian University, he moved towards managing and journalism following retirement.

He spent most of his career playing for Cracovia, also was captain of the Poland national team in the historic, first game against Hungary in Budapest on 21 December 1921). Also a captain of Cracovia, he made 318 appearances for the club from 1910 to 1924. On 31 August 1913, he coached the Galicia national team in its only international match against Moravia and Silesia.

After finishing his career, he became a coach and a journalist. He was the first editor-in-chief of Polish sports daily Przeglad Sportowy. On 30 August 1925, he took the post of manager of the Poland, before being replaced in June 1927 by Stefan Loth.

Synowiec was son of Stanisław Synowiec (1859–1908), a locksmith, and Józefa née Bania. He had three siblings - sisters Waleria (1884–1945) and Otylia (1906–1907) and brother Józef (1886–1945).

He was born in Świątniki Górne near Wieliczka.

In the school year 1918–1919, he was a teacher in the Polish school in Ostróg.

In 1947, he was a chairman of Silesian Football Association (Śląski Związek Piłki Nożnej), a branch of the Polish Football Association. Since 1959 Synowiec lived in Kędzierzyn. He died on 7 November 1960 in Kędzierzyn and was buried on the Rakowicki Cemetery in Kraków.

Sporting positions
Preceded by (Poland) Tadeusz Kuchar	Poland National Team Coach; 30 August 1925 – 19 June 1927	Succeeded by (Poland) Tadeusz Kuchar
