= Józef Smoczek =

Polish footballer

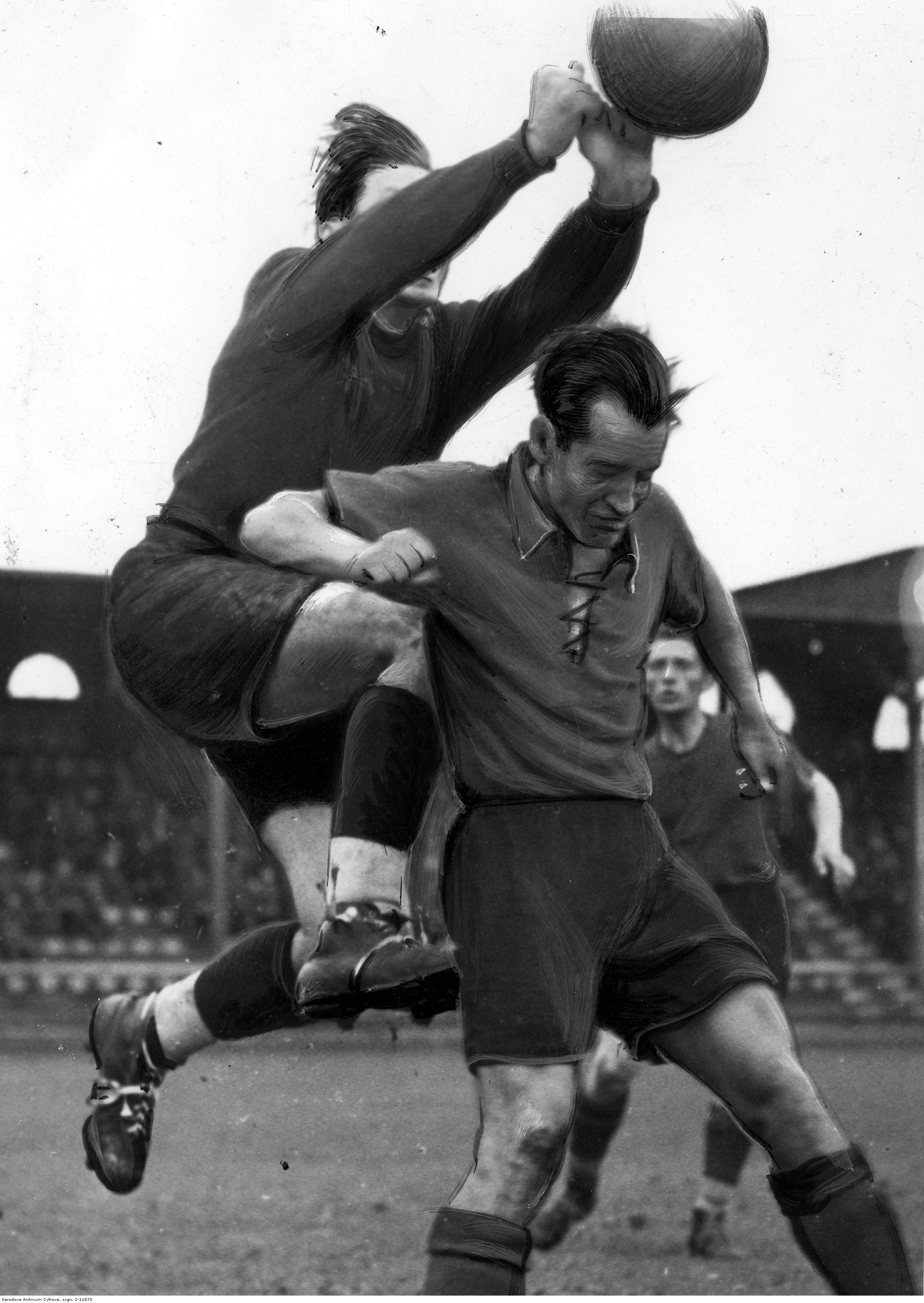

Personal information
- Full name: Józef Antoni Smoczek
- Date of birth: 17 January 1908
- Place of birth: Tarnów, Austria-Hungary
- Date of death: 29 August 1984 (aged 76)
- Place of death: Kraków, Poland
- Height: 1.70 m (5 ft 7 in)
- Position: Forward

Senior career*
| Years | Team | Apps | (Gls) |
| 1922–1927 | Tarnovia Tarnów | | |
| 1927–1934 | Garbarnia Kraków | | |
| 1934 | Szczakowianka Jaworzno | | |
| 1935–1939 | KS Warszawianka | | |
| 1939 | SKS Starachowice | | |
- DTSG Krakau

International career
| 1930–1935 | Poland | 4 | (2) |

Managerial career
- Sandecja Nowy Sącz
- * Club domestic league appearances and goals

Józef Smoczek (17 January 1908 – 29 August 1984) was a Polish footballer who played as a forward.

He made four appearances for the Poland national team from 1930 to 1935.

== Honours ==
Garbarnia Kraków

- Ekstraklasa: 1931
