= Witold Wypijewski =

Polish footballer

Personal information
- Date of birth: 25 November 1907
- Place of birth: Tashkent, Russian Empire
- Date of death: 25 November 1981 (aged 74)
- Place of death: Warsaw, Poland
- Height: 1.78 m (5 ft 10 in)
- Position: Forward

Senior career*
Years	Team	Apps	(Gls)
1922–1923	Znicz Pruszków		
1924–1925	AZS Warsaw		
1926–1937	Legia Warsaw		
1937–1939	Okęcie Warsaw		
1945	Okęcie Warsaw		

International career
1928–1934	Poland	5	(2)

Managerial career
- 1946–1947: Unia-Proch Pionki
- 1958–1959: Znicz Pruszków
- * Club domestic league appearances and goals

Witold Wypijewski (25 November 1907 – 25 November 1981) was a Polish footballer who played as a forward.

He earned five caps for the Poland national team from 1928 to 1934.
