= Jerzy Piec =

Polish footballer

Personal information
- Full name: Wilhelm Jerzy Piec
- Date of birth: 2 November 1915
- Place of birth: Lipiny, German Empire
- Date of death: 4 April 1954 (aged 38)
- Place of death: Świętochłowice, Poland
- Height: 1.75 m (5 ft 9 in)
- Position: Midfielder

Senior career*
Years	Team	Apps	(Gls)
1927–1939	Naprzód Lipiny		
1939	AKS Chorzów		
1940–1945	TuS 1883 Lipine		
1946–1948	AKS Chorzów		

International career
1937–1947	Poland	6	(1)
- * Club domestic league appearances and goals

Wilhelm Jerzy Piec (née Pietz; 2 November 1915 – 4 April 1954) was a Polish footballer who played as a midfielder.

Together with his older brother Ryszard Piec, they represented Naprzód Lipiny – a small team from the hamlet of Lipiny, which never managed to qualify for the top division, but played a significant role in interwar Polish football.

He was part of Poland's squad at the 1936 Summer Olympics, but did not play in any matches. Piec represented Poland in four games. He was called up for the 1938 FIFA World Cup, but did not travel with the team to France. During the war, he continued playing in Naprzód, which was forced to change its name to TuS Lipine. After the war, from 1946 to 1948, he played for AKS Chorzów.
