= Karl Hohmann =

German footballer

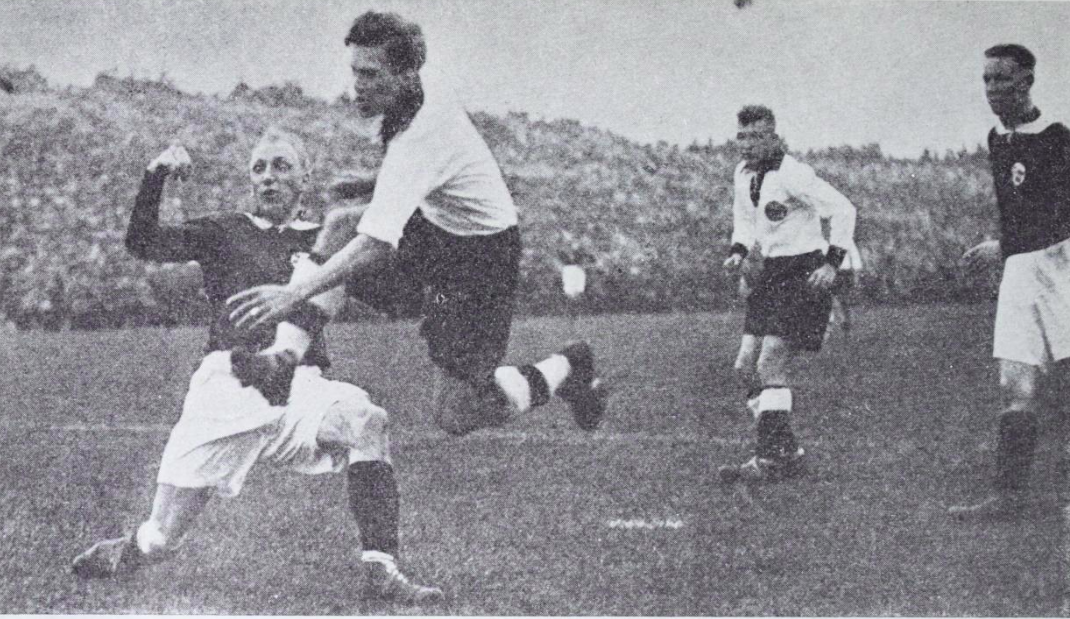
- Scoring against Norway in Magdeburg on 5 November 1933

Personal information
- Date of birth: 19 June 1908
- Place of birth: Düsseldorf, German Empire
- Date of death: 30 March 1974 (aged 65)
- Place of death: Benrath, West Germany
- Position: Midfielder

Senior career*
Years	Team	Apps	(Gls)
1929–1937	VfL Benrath		
1937–1939	FK Pirmasens		

International career
1930–1937	Germany	26	(20)

Managerial career
- 1949–1954: Rot-Weiss Essen
Medal record
Men's football
Representing Germany
FIFA World Cup
Third place	1934 Italy
- * Club domestic league appearances and goals

Karl Hohmann (19 June 1908 – 30 March 1974) was a German football (soccer) player. He was born in Düsseldorf and died in Benrath.

Between 1930 and 1937, he played 26 times and scored 20 goals for the Germany national football team. He played in the 1934 FIFA World Cup, scoring 2 goals in the 2-1 quarter-final win against Sweden. Germany went on to finish third. He was also part of Germany's squad at the 1936 Summer Olympics. Later, he became the coach of Rot-Weiss Essen, leading them to win the 1953 German Cup.
