= Josef Rasselnberg =

German footballer and trainer

Personal information
- Date of birth: 18 December 1912
- Place of birth: Düsseldorf, Germany
- Date of death: 9 February 2005 (aged 92)
- Position: Forward

Senior career*
Years	Team	Apps	(Gls)
1930–1937	VfL Benrath		
1937–1956	Eintracht Bad Kreuznach		

International career
1933–1935	Germany	9	(8)

Managerial career
- 1951–1961: Eintracht Bad Kreuznach
- 1961: Arminia Bielefeld
- * Club domestic league appearances and goals

Josef "Jupp" Rasselnberg (18 December 1912 – 9 February 2005) was a German former football player and trainer who featured in the Germany national team as a striker. The summit of his international career was the 1934 FIFA World Cup qualifier against Luxembourg on 11 March 1934, in which he scored four times. In his other eight international matches he scored an additional four goals.

== Honours ==
Benrath

- Westdeutscher Pokal (West German Cup) (2): 1932, 1933
- Gauliga Niederrhein I (2): 1934, 1935
