= Ewald Urban =

Polish footballer (1913–1959)

Personal information
- Full name: Ewald Kurt Urban
- Date of birth: 22 July 1913
- Place of birth: Hajduki Wielkie, Poland
- Date of death: 8 January 1959 (aged 45)
- Place of death: Wolfhagen, Germany
- Height: 1.62 m (5 ft 4 in)
- Position: Forward

Senior career*
Years	Team	Apps	(Gls)
1928–1933	Ruch Wielkie Hajduki		
1933	PPW Katowice		
1934–1936	Ruch Wielkie Hajduki		
1937	Vorwärts-Rasensport Gleiwitz		
1938	Hertha BSC		
1939–1940	Bismarckhutter SV		

International career
1932–1934	Poland	6	(2)
- * Club domestic league appearances and goals

Ewald Urban (22 July 1913 – 8 January 1959) was a Polish footballer who played as a forward. He played in six matches for the Poland national team from 1932 to 1934.
