= Jerzy Wostal =

Polish footballer

Personal information
- Full name: Jerzy Adolf Wostal
- Date of birth: 6 December 1914
- Place of birth: Królewska Huta, German Empire
- Date of death: 12 February 1991 (aged 76)
- Place of death: Passau, Germany
- Height: 1.77 m (5 ft 10 in)
- Position: Forward

Senior career*
Years	Team	Apps	(Gls)
- ZPS Chorzów
1933–1939	AKS Królewska Huta		
1939–1941	Vorwärts-Rasensport Gleiwitz		
1945–1954	1. FC Passau		

International career
1936–1939	Poland	10	(4)
- * Club domestic league appearances and goals

Jerzy Adolf Wostal (6 December 1914 – 12 February 1991) was a Polish footballer who played as a forward.

He was born in 1914 in Königshütte (later Chorzów). In the late 1930s, Wostal played for AKS Chorzów. The best year in his career was 1937. His team then became vice-champions of Poland, and he was the top scorer of the Polish Football League, with 12 goals.

He made 10 appearances for the Poland national team, scoring four goals. Wostal's debut took place on 6 September 1936 in a 3–3 draw against Latvia in Riga. He was also part of Poland's squad at the 1936 Summer Olympics, but he did not play in any matches. One of the best matches in his career occurred on 10 October 1937 in Warsaw. In a 1938 FIFA World Cup qualifier, Poland beat Yugoslavia 4–0, with Wostal scoring one of the goals.

Wostal's last game in the white-red jersey took place on 27 May 1939 in Łódź, a 3–3 draw with Belgium.

Little is known about Wostal's whereabouts during and after World War II. He signed the German Nationality List (Volksliste) and changed the name to Georg Wostal. Some time between 1940 and 1944, he played for Vorwärts-Rasensport Gleiwitz (Gliwice), which was one of the best sides of Upper Silesia in those years, winning the Silesian championship for several times. Then, after 1945, his fate is unknown other than he died in 1991.
