= Karol Kossok =

Polish footballer (1907–1946)

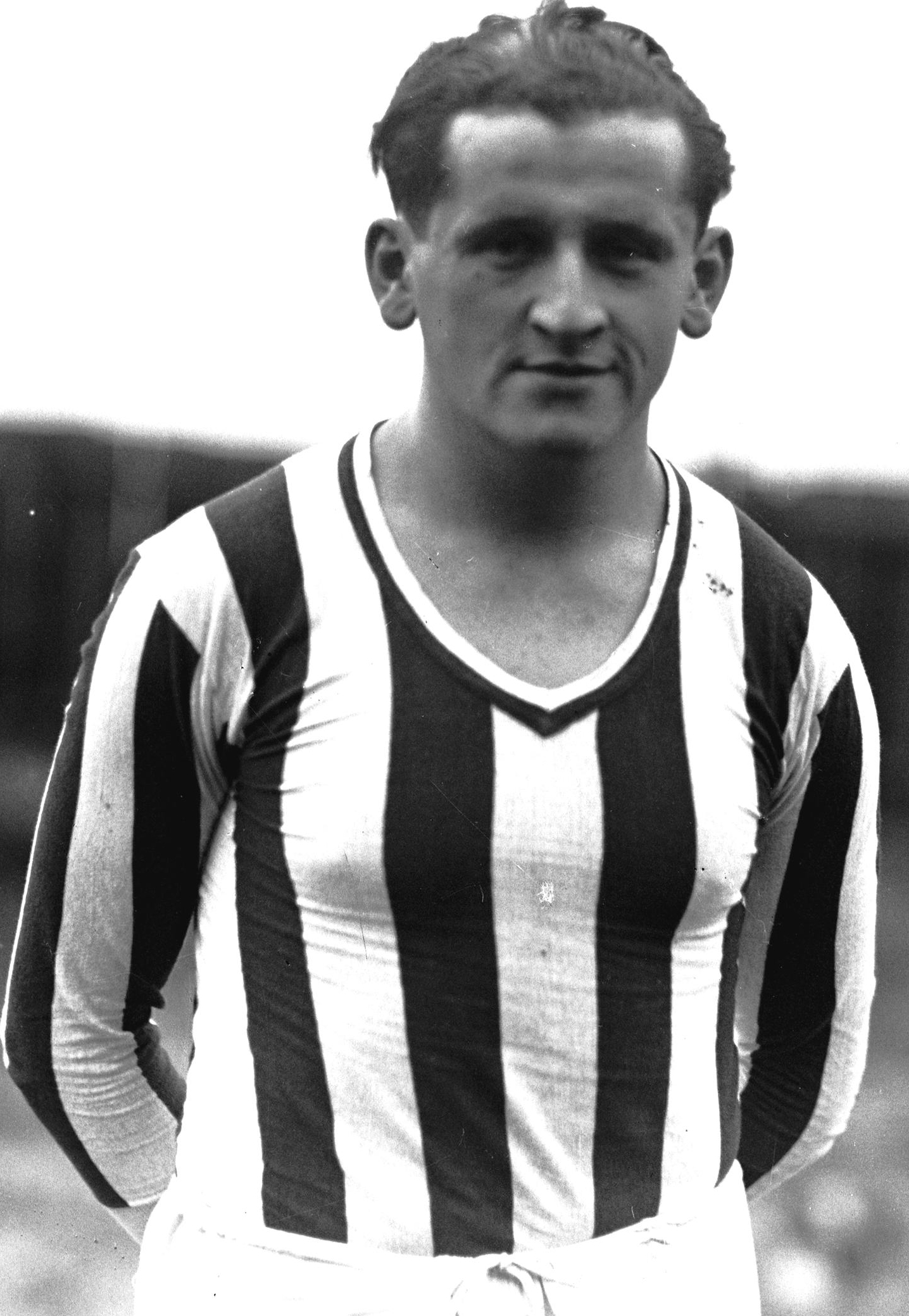

Personal information
- Full name: Karol Albert Jakub Kossok
- Date of birth: 28 January 1907
- Place of birth: Przemyśl, Austria-Hungary
- Date of death: 11 March 1946 (aged 39)
- Place of death: Soviet POW camp, Germany
- Height: 1.83 m (6 ft 0 in)
- Position: Striker

Youth career
- 1921–1923: FC Katowice

Senior career*
Years	Team	Apps	(Gls)
1923–1928	FC Katowice	43	(26)
1929–1930	Cracovia	37	(41)
1931	Pogoń Lwów	22	(22)
1933–1936	Cracovia	20	(16)
Total		122	(108)

International career
1928–1932	Poland	5	(3)

Managerial career
- 1936: Cracovia
- 1938–1939: Polonia Warsaw
- * Club domestic league appearances and goals

Karol Albert Jakub Kossok (28 January 1907 – 11 March 1946) was a Polish footballer who played as a forward. Kossok was the top scorer of the Polish First Division in 1930 (with 24 goals).

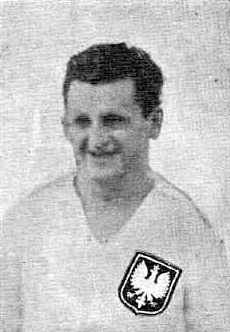
Karol Kossok

== Career ==
Born in Katowice, Kossok's career started in a German-minority team FC Preussen Kattowitz (later 1. FC Kattowitz), then in 1929 he moved to Cracovia. In 1931, Kossok moved to Pogoń Lwów. After a lone season in Lwów, he returned to Cracovia, where he played until winning the 1937 championship.

He played five games for the Poland national team (including one in 1932 as an unassociated player), scoring three goals (first game on 1 July 1928 in Katowice, 2–1 against Sweden). His tall, heavy frame deceived many defenders. Regarded by many as slow and sluggish, he was a natural killer in the penalty area and a very skilled dribbler. However, did not have enough strength and hardly managed to play his best for the whole 90 minutes. After finishing his career (due to several injuries), he became a coach in Cracovia, also helping Józef Kałuża with managing the national team.

During World War II, he signed the Volksliste, but his exact whereabouts at that time are not known. Some time in the summer of 1944 he was drafted into the Wehrmacht. Captured by the Red Army at the end of the war, he died in a Soviet POW camp in East Germany in 1946, aged 39.

== Honours ==
Cracovia

- Ekstraklasa: 1930

Individual

- Ekstraklasa top scorer: 1930
