= Leopold Duźniak =

Polish footballer

Personal information
- Full name: Leopold Marian Duźniak
- Date of birth: 7 September 1900
- Place of birth: Krowodrza, Austria-Hungary
- Date of death: 7 March 1974 (aged 73)
- Place of death: Szczecin, Poland
- Position: Forward

Senior career*
Years	Team	Apps	(Gls)
1920–1932	Olsza Kraków		

International career
1922	Poland	1	(1)
- * Club domestic league appearances and goals

Leopold Duźniak (7 September 1900 – 7 March 1974) was a Polish footballer who played as a forward.

He made one appearances for the Poland national team, scoring the only goal for his team in a 1–1 draw against Romania on 3 September 1922.
