= Juliusz Miller =

Polish footballer (1895–1980)

Personal information
- Date of birth: 16 July 1895
- Place of birth: Dziewięcierz, Poland
- Date of death: 31 May 1980 (aged 84)
- Place of death: Kraków, Poland
- Height: 1.78 m (5 ft 10 in)
- Position: Forward

Senior career*
Years	Team	Apps	(Gls)
1908–1924	Czarni Lwów		

International career
1923–1924	Poland	6	(1)
- * Club domestic league appearances and goals

Juliusz Miller (16 July 1895 – 31 May 1980) was a Polish footballer who played as a forward. He played in six matches for the Poland national football team in 1923 and 1924.

A Polish Army officer, he participated in both World Wars, fought in the Polish-Soviet War, the Silesian Uprisings and the September Campaign.
