= Henryk Martyna =

Polish footballer (1907–1984)

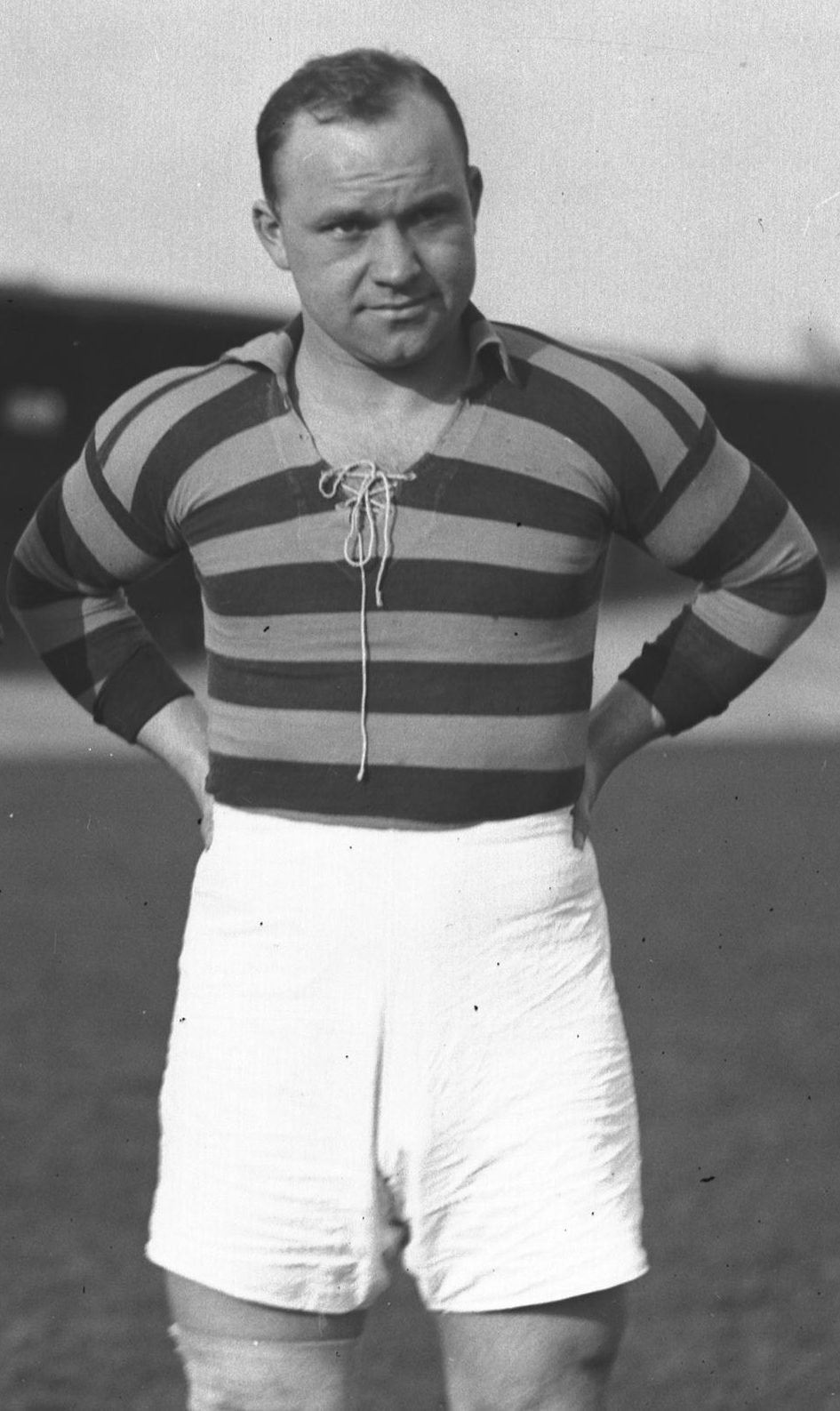

Personal information
- Full name: Henryk Julian Martyna
- Date of birth: 14 November 1907
- Place of birth: Kraków, Austria-Hungary
- Date of death: 17 November 1984 (aged 77)
- Place of death: Kraków, Poland
- Height: 1.67 m (5 ft 5 1/2 in)
- Position: Defender

Senior career*
| Years | Team | Apps | (Gls) |
| 1920–1923 | Orzeł Kraków | | |
| 1924–1928 | Korona Kraków | | |
| 1928–1936 | Legia Warsaw | 160 | (18) |
| 1937–1939 | Warszawianka | 28 | (1) |

International career
| 1930–1936 | Poland | 23 | (4) |
- * Club domestic league appearances and goals

Henryk Julian Martyna (14 November 1907 – 17 November 1984) was a Polish footballer who played as a defender. He was a key member of Poland national team in the early 1930s.

His career started in Korona Kraków, then in 1928 moved to one of top teams of Poland - Legia Warsaw. He stayed there until 1937, then in the years 1937-1939 represented Warszawianka. From 1929 to 1936, he represented Poland, and was part of the squad for the 1936 Summer Olympics in Berlin. Together with Polonia Warsaw’s Jerzy Bulanow, Nawrot created a pair of excellent defenders. All together, he played 32 games for the national team, scoring 5 goals.
