= Aurel Guga =

Romanian footballer

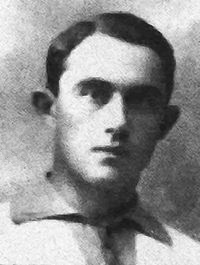

Personal information
- Date of birth: 10 August 1898
- Place of birth: Temeskubin, Austria-Hungary
- Date of death: 7 November 1936 (aged 38)
- Place of death: Timișoara, Romania
- Position: Forward

Senior career*
Years	Team	Apps	(Gls)
1919–1920	Vulturii Lugoj		
1920–1925	Universitatea Cluj		
1925	Gloria CFR Arad		
1926–1927	UCAS Petroşani		
1927–1929	Jiul Lupeni		
1929–1930	Universitatea Cluj		

International career
1922–1928	Romania	12	(4)
- * Club domestic league appearances and goals

Aurel Guga (10 August 1898 – 7 November 1936) was a Romanian football player. Regarded as one of the most talented and versatile players of the early 1920s, Guga was the first captain of the Romania football team. He was also part of Romania's squad for the football tournament at the 1924 Summer Olympics.

== Early life ==
Born in Temeskubin (Cuvin) in what is now Serbia on 10 August 1898, with other sources claiming that he was born in 1900, Guga finished high school in Oravița, before moving to Lugoj. Because of World War I he could not start playing football until 1919, when he was 21. He started at the local club, Vulturii Lugoj, but stayed only one year because he wanted to apply for the Commercial Academy from Cluj.

== Career ==
After his arrival in Cluj, he joined U Cluj, a club formed one year earlier by the "Sports Society of University Students". At the time, he only played with his team in local competitions since there was not any football championship at a national level. In January 1922, a Viennese newspaper dedicated a full-page article to him, calling him "an exceptional forward player".

Sometime in October or November 1923, U Cluj got to play its first tournament abroad, at the invitation of the Grenoble municipality for the opening of their new stadium. U Cluj first played in Lyon, with a local team, managing to win with 5–2; Aurel Guga scored three times. The next day, the French press wrote that "he is a world-class player". Since there were rumors at the times about a friendly between the England national team and a team of selected players from the continent, Guga was proposed by the French to play for Europe. In Grenoble, U Cluj beat the French, winning with 3–0, with Guga scoring twice.

After he graduated from college in 1925, the press wrote that "the excellent international Romanian player will settle in Timișoara, very likely signing with one of the local teams." However, there are no official documents to confirm that he actually played for Timișoara. Instead, in November, he started playing for Gloria CFR Arad, helping his team finish second in the Regional Championship. Sometime in March 1926, he joined UCAS Petroşani, the vice-champion team at the time, but retired from all the competitions that season. From 1927 he had a two-year spell in Lupeni, playing for local Jiul, and in 1929, he returned to Cluj, to play for the last time for the club that made him famous. In 1930, he was officially retired.

On 8 November 1936, Gazeta Sporturilor reported that the day before, Guga was involved in a car accident. He lost control of his car, fell into the Bega Channel, and drowned.

As Ioan Chirilă recalls in his book:

Guga was one of the finest players our land ever gave. And maybe the most complete. And the most modern.

== International career ==
Aurel Guga captained the first official match of the Romania national team in the 1922 King Alexander's Cup, against Yugoslavia, a match won by the Romanian team with Guga scoring the winning goal. He played six years for Romania, managing twelve caps and four goals. He also captained nine out of twelve matches.

Scores and results table. Romania's goal tally first:

International appearances and goals
App	Date	Venue	Opponent	Result	Goal	Competition
1.	8 June 1922	Belgrade, Yugoslavia	Yugoslavia	2–1	1	Friendly
2.	3 September 1922	Chernivtsi, Romania	Poland	1–1	0	Friendly
3.	1 July 1923	Cluj, Romania	Czechoslovakia	0–6	0	Friendly
4.	2 September 1923	Lviv, Poland	Poland	1–1	1	Friendly
5.	20 May 1924	Vienna, Austria	Austria	1–4	0	Friendly
6.	27 May 1924	Paris, France	Netherlands	0–6	0	1924 Summer Olympics
7.	31 May 1925	Sofia, Bulgaria	Bulgaria	4–2	0	Friendly
8.	25 April 1926	Bucharest, Romania	Bulgaria	6–1	1	Friendly
9.	3 October 1926	Zagreb, Yugoslavia	Yugoslavia	3–2	1	King Alexandru's Cup
10.	10 May 1927	Bucharest, Romania	Yugoslavia	0–3	0	King Alexandru's Cup
11.	19 June 1927	Bucharest, Romania	Poland	3–3	0	Friendly
12.	15 April 1928	Arad, Romania	Turkey	4–2	0	Friendly

== Death ==
He died on 7 November 1936 at age 38, while driving his car in Timișoara and falling in the Bega river, where he drowned.
