= Zygmunt Steuermann =

Polish footballer, born 1901

Personal information
- Date of birth: 5 February 1899
- Place of birth: Sambir, Ukraine
- Date of death: December 1941 (aged 42)
- Place of death: Lviv, Ukraine
- Height: 1.83 m (6 ft 0 in)
- Position: Forward

Youth career
- Korona Sambor
- Germania Wien
- –1917: Austria Wien

Senior career*
| Years | Team | Apps | (Gls) |
| 1920 | Korona Sambor | | |
| 1921 | Hakoah Stryi | | |
| 1921–1922 | ŻKS Lwów | | |
| 1922–1923 | Korona Sambor | | |
| 1923–1928 | Hasmonea Lwów | | |
| 1929 | Legia Warsaw | | |
| 1930–1932 | Hasmonea Lwów | | |
| 1932–1939 | Korona Sambor | | |
| 1940–1941 | Dynamo Sambor | | |

International career
| 1926–1928 | Poland | 2 | (4) |
- * Club domestic league appearances and goals

Zygmunt Steuermann (5 February 1899 – December 1941) was a Polish footballer who played as a forward. He was one of the most renowned members of the Hasmonea Lwów football club.

== Life ==
Born in Sambor, then in Austro-Hungarian Galicia, Steuermann was Jewish and a member of a Polonized Jewish family. His older brother was pianist Eduard Steuermann. His older sister was the actress and screenwriter Salka Viertel. As a child, he was nicknamed Dusko.

At the age of 12, he joined the local Korona Sambor. During World War I, he fled to Vienna, where he continued his training in a variety of sport clubs, including Gersthof Wien, Germania Wien, and Amateure Wien. After the war, he returned to Poland and in 1920 started a semi-professional career in Korona Sambor. During the following year, he moved to Lwów (modern Lviv, Ukraine), where he joined the ŻKS Lwów sports club. In 1923, he was transferred to Hasmonea Lwów, the most important Jewish football club in Poland and one of the four Lwów-based clubs playing in the first league. He remained one of the most notable players of that club until 1932, when he joined Legia Warsaw.

He also played twice in the Poland national team, scoring four goals: three in a match against Turkey in 1926 and one against the USA in 1928. He was one of only two first-timers in the history of the Poland national team to score a hat-trick in the first match, the other being Józef Korbas (in 1937 against Bulgaria).

During the Nazi and Soviet invasion of Poland in 1939, he fled Warsaw and settled in his hometown, which was then annexed by the USSR. He returned to Korona Sambor, which was soon afterwards closed down and recreated as Dinamo Sambor by the Soviet authorities. Following the Nazi take-over of eastern Poland, he was arrested and sent to the Lemberg Ghetto, where he died in December 1941 aged 42.
