= Józef Nawrot =

Polish footballer (1906–1982)

Personal information
- Full name: Józef Nawrot
- Date of birth: 24 September 1906
- Place of birth: Kraków, Poland
- Date of death: 24 September 1982 (aged 76)
- Place of death: Southsea, England
- Height: 1.72 m (5 ft 8 in)
- Position: Striker

Youth career
- Wawel Kraków
- 1922–1925: Cracovia

Senior career*
Years	Team	Apps	(Gls)
1925	WKS 1 PP Leg Wilno		
1926–1927	Cracovia		
1927–1936	Legia Warsaw	175	(107)
1937–1939	Polonia Warsaw	15	(8)

International career
1928–1935	Poland	19	(16)
- * Club domestic league appearances and goals

Józef Nawrot (24 September 1906 – 24 September 1982) was a Polish footballer who played as a striker. He was one of the top scorers in the Polish top division with over 100 goals. During his career, he played for WKS 1 PP Leg Wilno, Cracovia, Legia Warsaw and Polonia Warsaw. He appeared 19 times for his country, scoring 16 goals.

During World War II, he was imprisoned in Siberia, before breaking out to join Anders' Army.
