= Leonard Piątek =

Polish footballer

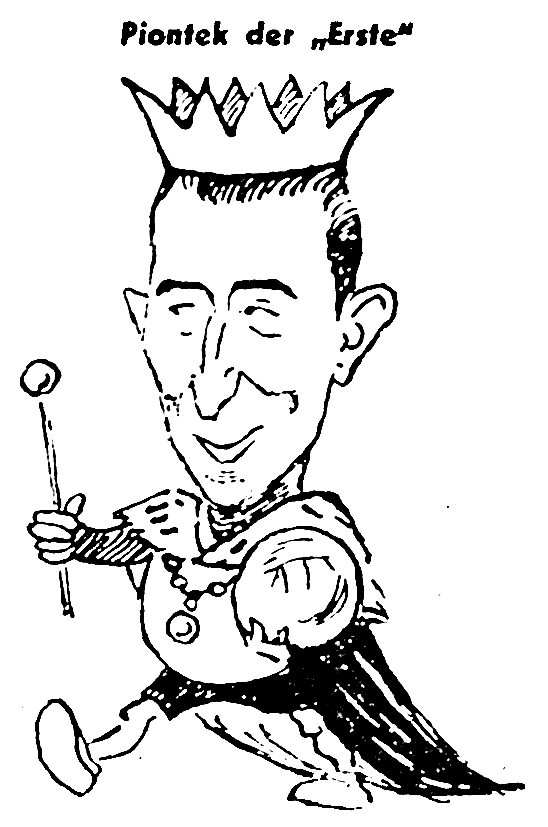

Personal information
- Full name: Leonard Franciszek Piątek
- Date of birth: 3 October 1913
- Place of birth: Königshütte, German Empire
- Date of death: 1 July 1967 (aged 53)
- Place of death: Chorzów, Poland
- Height: 1.76 m (5 ft 9 in)
- Position: Forward

Youth career
- AKS Chorzów

Senior career*
Years	Team	Apps	(Gls)
1926–1936	AKS Królewska Huta		
1936–1937	Flota Gdynia		
1937–1939	AKS Chorzów		
1939–1944	Germania Königshütte		
1946–1947	AKS Chorzów		
1948–1949	Pogoń Katowice		

International career
1936–1939	Poland	17	(11)

Managerial career
- 1948–1949: Pogoń Katowice (player-manager)
- 1950–1951: Budowlani Chorzów
- 1954: Budowlani Chorzów
- Wyzwolenie Michałkowice
- Bobrek Karb
- * Club domestic league appearances and goals

Leonard Franciszek Piątek (born Leonard Franz Piontek, 3 October 1913 – 1 July 1967) was a Polish footballer who played as a forward in the interwar period. In the spring of 1937, he changed his name to Leonard Franciszek Piątek (a Polonized version).

A hard-working and ambitious forward, Piątek was the top scorer for Polish first division vice-champions AKS Chorzów in 1937 and went on to lead the league the following season with 21 goals.

He represented the Polish national side on 16 occasions between 1937 and 1939, scoring 11 goals. He scored twice in Poland's 4–0 win over Yugoslavia in a World Cup qualifier and took part in the legendary 1938 FIFA World Cup match against Brazil in Strasbourg, France on 5 June 1938, which Brazil won 6–5. Piątek also scored a goal in the last international match played in Poland before the outbreak of World War II, a 4–2 victory over Hungary on 27 August 1939.

Piątek signed the Volksliste (German Nationality List) after the Nazi invasion of Poland during World War II which allowed him to continue his footballing career. His club AKS Chorzów was now playing as Germania Königshütte, and with Piątek as their key player, the team dominated the first division Gauliga Schlesien – part of the German football league system – throughout the early 1940s far outperforming state-supported rivals 1. FC Katowice.

After the war, he played for AKS Chorzów until the end of the 1947 season, and moved to Pogoń Katowice, where he played from 1948 until 1949.
