= Stefan Loth =

Polish footballer

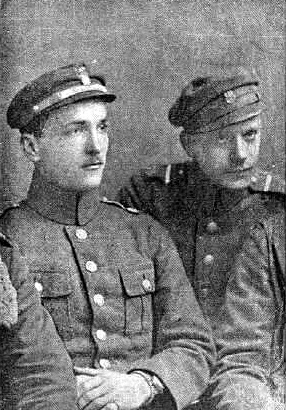

Personal information
- Full name: Stefan August Loth
- Date of birth: 28 May 1896
- Place of birth: Grodziec, Poland
- Date of death: 16 July 1936 (aged 40)
- Place of death: near Gdynia, Poland
- Height: 1.78 m (5 ft 10 in)
- Position: Midfielder

Senior career*
Years	Team	Apps	(Gls)
1909	Varsovia		
1911–1914	Polonia Warsaw		
1913	Korona Warsaw		
1918	Korona Warsaw		
1918–1929	Polonia Warsaw		

International career
1926	Poland	1	(0)

Managerial career
- 1928–1931: Poland
- * Club domestic league appearances and goals

Stefan August Loth (28 May 1896 – 16 July 1936) was a Polish footballer and soldier. He played in one match for the Poland national team in 1926, and managed them from 1928 to 1931. A lieutenant colonel of the Polish Army infantry, he fought in the Polish–Soviet War. He died in a RWD 9 plane crash near Gdynia on 16 July 1936.

== Honours and orders ==
- Silver Cross of the Virtuti Militari (26 March 1921)
- Cross of Valor, four times
- Silver Cross of Merit (10 November 1928)
- Gold Cross of Merit (posthumously, 18 July 1936)
- Cross of Independence (23 December 1933)
- Commemorative Medal for the Polish–Soviet War
- Medal of the Tenth Anniversary of Regained Independence
- Commemorative Badge of the Inspector General of the Armed Forces (12 May 1936)
- Officer Cross of the Order of Saint Alexander (Bulgaria, posthumously, 1936)
- Allied Victory Medal
