= Ryszard Piec =

Polish footballer

Personal information
- Full name: Ryszard Leon Piec
- Date of birth: 17 August 1913
- Place of birth: Świętochłowice, German Empire
- Date of death: 24 January 1979 (aged 65)
- Place of death: Świętochłowice, Poland
- Position: Forward

Senior career*
| Years | Team | Apps | (Gls) |
| 1923–1939 | Naprzód Lipiny | | |
| 1939–1945 | TuS 1883 Lipine | | |
| 1946–1951 | Naprzód Lipiny | | |

International career
| 1935–1939 | Poland | 21 | (3) |
- * Club domestic league appearances and goals

Ryszard Leon Piec (born Richard Leon Pietz; 17 August 1913 – 24 January 1979) was a Polish footballer who played as a forward.

Piec spent his entire career in his native town of Lipiny, which now today is a district of Świętochłowice, in Upper Silesia. He played for Naprzód Lipiny, a team which, in spite of several attempts, never managed to qualify to the Ekstraklasa. From 1935 to 1939 he represented Poland in 24 matches, scoring five goals. His debut took place in a 2–3 friendly loss to Yugoslavia on 18 August 1935.

He participated in 1936 Summer Olympics in Berlin, where Poland was placed on the 4th position, after losing 2–3 to Norway. During the Olympics, he played in three games, a 3–0 qualifier win over Hungary, a 5–4 quarter-victory over Great Britain and a 1–3 semi-final loss to Austria. He also took part in a memorable 1938 FIFA World Cup match against Brazil, lost 5–6.

During the Second World War, German occupiers allowed Upper Silesians to participate in sports tournaments. Piec's club, Naprzód Lipiny, was forced to change its name to Turn und Sport (TUS) Lipine. Ryszard (then known as Richard Pietz), together with his brother Wilhelm Piec, was a key player in this team.

In the 1941–42 season of DFB-Pokal, TUS Lipine with Piec brothers was a sensation. In the third round, the Silesians beat Adler Deblin 4–1, then in the following round, TUS Lipine defeated Blau-Weiss 90 by the same margin. In the semifinals however, professionals from TSV 1860 Munich proved to be too strong, beating TUS 6–0.

After the war, Piec continued his career in Naprzód Lipiny until 1951. Following retirement, he became a coach.
