= Wawrzyniec Staliński =

Polish footballer (1899–1985)

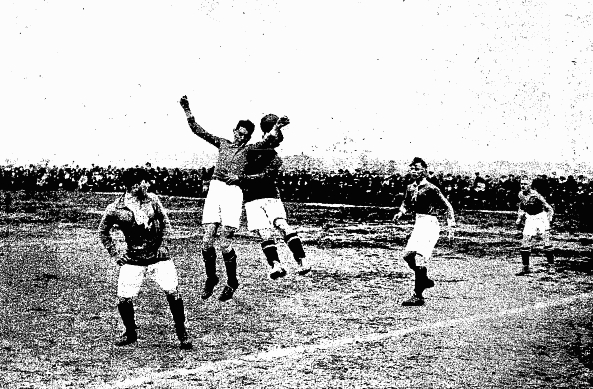
- Staliński's head shot during Warta Poznań - Ostrovia football match.

Personal information
- Full name: Wawrzyniec Staliński
- Date of birth: 28 July 1899
- Place of birth: Wilda, German Empire
- Date of death: 3 June 1985 (aged 85)
- Place of death: Wrocław, Poland
- Position: Striker

Youth career
- –1914: Sparta Poznań

Senior career*
Years	Team	Apps	(Gls)
1914–1919	Posnania Poznań		
1919–1930	Warta Poznań		

International career
1922–1928	Poland	13	(11)
- * Club domestic league appearances and goals

Wawrzyniec Staliński (28 July 1899 – 3 June 1985) was a Polish footballer who played as a striker.

During his career, he played for Posnania Poznań and Warta Poznań, winning the Polish national championship in 1929 with the latter.

He appeared 13 times for his country, scoring 11 goals. He was also part of Poland's squad for the football tournament at the 1924 Summer Olympics, but he did not play in any matches.

== Honours ==
Warta Poznań

- Ekstraklasa: 1929
