= Józef Korbas =

Polish footballer (1914–1981)

Personal information
- Full name: Józef Franciszek Korbas
- Date of birth: 11 November 1914
- Place of birth: Kraków, Austria-Hungary
- Date of death: 2 October 1981 (aged 66)
- Place of death: Katowice, Poland
- Height: 1.68 m (5 ft 6 in)
- Position: Forward

Senior career*
Years	Team	Apps	(Gls)
1928–1935	Nadwiślan Kraków		
1935–1939	Cracovia	57	(37)

International career
1937–1938	Poland	2	(4)
- * Club domestic league appearances and goals

Józef Franciszek Korbas (11 November 1914 – 2 October 1981) was a Polish footballer who played as a forward. He played for Cracovia and the Poland national team during the interwar period.

== Club career ==
In Cracovia, Korbas played from 1935 to 1939. In 69 games during that time, he scored 54 goals.

== International career ==
Korbas is famous for his excellent national team debut. On 12 September 1937 in Sofia, he scored three goals in a 3–3 draw against Bulgaria. In the history of the Poland national team, only two players managed to score a hat-trick in their first game, the other being Zygmunt Steuermann. Korbas's second and last match in white-red jersey took place in Warsaw on 25 September 1938, a 4–4 draw against Yugoslavia. In this game, he also scored a goal.

== After football ==
During Nazi occupation of Poland, in 1942 was arrested by the Germans and in March 1943 sent to Auschwitz concentration camp. From there, he was shuttled to Sachsenhausen concentration camp. Having survived this, he returned to Poland after the war, and became a sports official as well as a coach. He managed Stilon Gorzów in 1954.

Korbas died on 2 October 1981 in Katowice.

== Honours ==
Cracovia

- Ekstraklasa: 1937
