= 1946 Wisła Kraków season =

Wisła Kraków
1946 season
- Chairman: Tadeusz Orzelski
- Manager: Jan Kotlarczyk
- A-Klasa (Kraków): 1st
- Mistrzostwa Polski: Quarterfinal

The 1946 season was Wisła Kraków's 38th year as a club.

== Friendlies ==
24 February 1946	Wisła Kraków (Poland)	9–0	(Poland) Legja Kraków	Kraków, Poland
11:30 CET (UTC+1)	Gracz; Woźniak	Report		Stadium: Stadion Wisły; Referee: Zbigniew Olewski (Kraków)

3 March 1946	Wisła Kraków (Poland)	6–2	(Poland) Reprezentacja Milicji	Kraków, Poland
	Woźniak; Giergiel; Gracz; Snopkowski; Kohut	Report	K. Bator; Sołek	Stadium: Stadion Wisły; Attendance: 4,000; Referee: Kazimierz Seichter (Kraków)

10 March 1946	Wisła Kraków (Poland)	2–1	(Poland) Wieczysta Kraków	Kraków, Poland
11:30 CET (UTC+1)	Gracz; Giergiel	Report	Kawula	Stadium: Stadion Wisły; Attendance: 4,000; Referee: Władysław Michalik (Kraków)

24 March 1946	Wisła Kraków (Poland)	3–1	(Poland) KS Cracovia	Kraków, Poland
15:30 CET (UTC+1)	Cisowski 26'; Woźniak 39'; Cholewa 64'	Report	S. Różankowski 65'	Stadium: Stadion Wisły; Attendance: 20,000; Referee: Kazimierz Seichter (Kraków)

31 March 1946	Wisła Kraków (Poland)	5–2	(Poland) Podgórze Kraków	Kraków, Poland
11:00 CET (UTC+1)	Woźniak; Legutko; Łyko; Wandas	Report		Stadium: Stadion Wisły

14 April 1946	Jarosławski KS (Poland)	0–2	(Poland) Wisła Kraków	Jarosław, Poland
16:30 CEST (UTC+2)		Report	Woźniak (pen.); Mącznik	Stadium: Stadion PWiWF

15 April 1946	Czarni Jarosław (Poland)	1–2	(Poland) Wisła Kraków	Jarosław, Poland
		Report	Legutko; Woźniak (pen.)

23 April 1946	Wisła Kraków (Poland)	0–3	(Czechoslovakia) SK Baťa Zlín	Kraków, Poland
17:30 CEST (UTC+2)		Report	Humpál 15'; Tichý 38' (pen.), ??'	Stadium: Stadion Wisły; Attendance: 10,000; Referee: Zbigniew Olewski (Kraków)

30 April 1946	SK Slezská Ostrava (Czechoslovakia)	2–0	(Poland) Wisła Kraków	Moravská Ostrava, Czechoslovakia
		Report

1 May 1946	Moravská Ostrava (Czechoslovakia)	1–4	(Poland) Wisła Kraków	Moravská Ostrava, Czechoslovakia
		Report	Bobula; Woźniak; Cholewa; Różankowski

2 May 1946	Frýdek-Místek (Czechoslovakia)	2–2	(Poland) Wisła Kraków	Frýdek-Místek, Czechoslovakia
18:30 CEST (UTC+2)		Report	Cholewa; Legutko

3 May 1946	KS Cracovia (Poland)	1–0	(Poland) Wisła Kraków	Kraków, Poland
17:30 CEST (UTC+2)	Bobula 30'	Report		Stadium: Stadion Garbarni; Attendance: 6,000

9 May 1946	Garbarnia Kraków (Poland)	1–4	(Poland) Wisła Kraków	Kraków, Poland
18:00 CEST (UTC+2)	Skrzyński II	Report	Cholewa; Woźniak; Kwinta	Stadium: Stadion Garbarni; Attendance: 6,000; Referee: Roman Mohyła (Kraków)

16 May 1946	ŁKS Łódź (Poland)	4–2	(Poland) Wisła Kraków	Łódź, Poland
18:30 CEST (UTC+2)	Włodarczyk 40'; Sidor 57', 58'; Hogendorf 68'	Report	Mącznik 6'; Cholewa 56'	Stadium: Stadion ŁKS-u; Attendance: 10,000

19 May 1946	Wisła Kraków (Poland)	4–0	(Poland) KS Borek	Kraków, Poland
	Woźniak (pen.); Cisowski; Legutko	Report		Stadium: Stadion Wisły

25 May 1946	Wisła Kraków (Poland)	3–3	(Poland) Garbarnia Kraków	Kraków, Poland
	Cholewa; Łyko ? (o.g.)	Report		Stadium: Stadion Wisły

26 May 1946	Wisła Kraków (Poland)	7–0	(Poland) Warta Poznań	Kraków, Poland
	Cholewa; Legutko; Woźniak; Łyko	Report		Stadium: Stadion Wisły; Referee: Władysław Michalik (Kraków)

30 May 1946	Wisła Kraków (Poland)	2–0	(Czechoslovakia) SK Slezská Ostrava	Kraków, Poland
18:30 CEST (UTC+2)	Gracz 14'; Łyko 41'	Report		Stadium: Stadion Wisły; Attendance: 20,000; Referee: Kazimierz Seichter (Kraków)

1 June 1946	AKS Chorzów (Poland)	5–2	(Poland) Wisła Kraków	Kraków, Poland
18:10 CEST (UTC+2)	Kulik; Piątek; Spodzieja; Pytel	Report	Gracz	Stadium: Stadion Cracovii; Referee: Edward Bill (Kraków)

2 June 1946	Polonia Bytom (Poland)	2–6	(Poland) Wisła Kraków	Kraków, Poland
17:45 CEST (UTC+2)	Matyas; Kazimierowicz	Report	Gracz; Cisowski; Wapiennik; Giergiel	Stadium: Stadion Cracovii

18 June 1946	Wisła Kraków (Poland)	2–2	(United Kingdom) British Army of the Rhine	Kraków, Poland
18:30 CEST (UTC+2)	E. Różankowski 40'; Giergiel ??' (pen.)	Report	Davis 7'; Parsons 62'	Stadium: Stadion Wisły; Attendance: 30,000; Referee: Roman Mohyła (Kraków)

7 July 1946	Orzeł / 1. KS Wrocław (Poland)	1–5	(Poland) Wisła Kraków	Wrocław, Poland
	Matuszewski	Report	Legutko; Cholewa; Jurowicz (pen.); Snopkowski; Jaskowski	Stadium: Stadion 1. KS; Attendance: 6,000

21 July 1946	Wisła Zakopane (Poland)	2–8	(Poland) Wisła Kraków	Zakopane, Poland
		Report

July 1946	Podhale Nowy Targ (Poland)	0–7	(Poland) Wisła Kraków	Nowy Targ, Poland
		Report

6 August 1946	Legia Warsaw (Poland)	2–4	(Poland) Wisła Kraków	Warsaw, Poland
18:00 CEST (UTC+2)	Mordarski (pen.)	Report	Gracz; Cholewa	Stadium: Stadion Wojska Polskiego

13 August 1946	Radomiak Radom (Poland)	2–3	(Poland) Wisła Kraków	Radom, Poland
	Czachor	Report	Gracz; Jaskowski	Stadium: Stadion Radomiaka

6 October 1946	Poznań (Poland)	0–1	(Poland) Wisła Kraków	Poznań, Poland
		Report	Cisowski 86'	Stadium: Stadion Warty; Attendance: 10,000

13 October 1946	Wisła Kraków (Poland)	5–2	(Poland) Krakowski Okręg Wojskowy	Kraków, Poland
11:00 CET (UTC+1)	Wandas; Legutko; Jaskowski; Woźniak	Report		Stadium: Stadion Wisły; Referee: Stanisław Jesionka (Kraków)

20 October 1946	Legia Krosno (Poland)	2–2	(Poland) Wisła Kraków	Krosno, Poland
14:30 CET (UTC+1)	Pelepszyn	Report	Cisowski	Stadium: Stadion Legii

10 November 1946	Bocheński KS (Poland)	3–1	(Poland) Wisła Kraków	Bochnia, Poland
		Report	Woźniak (pen.)	Stadium: Stadion BKS-u

24 November 1946	Wisła Kraków (Poland)	1–0	(Poland) KS Cracovia	Kraków, Poland
11:30 CET (UTC+1)	Legutko	Report	Gędłek (red card) ??'	Stadium: Stadion Wisły; Attendance: 10,000

1 December 1946	Wisła Kraków (Poland)	2–1	(Poland) Ruch Chorzów	Kraków, Poland
11:30 CET (UTC+1)	Legutko; Gracz	Report	Peterek	Stadium: Stadion Wisły; Referee: Władysław Michalik (Kraków)

=== Mixed teams ===
12 November 1946	KS Cracovia / Wisła Kraków (Poland)	2–0	(Hungary) Kispesti AC	Kraków, Poland
14:00 CET (UTC+1)	Gracz; Cholewa	Report		Stadium: Stadion Cracovii

== A Klasa - Kraków - Qualifying round ==
17 March 1946 9	Wisła Kraków	8–0	Dalin Myślenice	Kraków
11:30 CET (UTC+1)	Gracz; M. Filek	Report		Stadium: Stadion Wisły

== A Klasa - Kraków ==
=== Group stage ===
26 June 1946 1	Dębnicki KS	1–5	Wisła Kraków	Kraków
18:30 CEST (UTC+2)	Madejczyk	Report	Cisowski; Woźniak; Cholewa	Stadium: Stadion Garbarni; Referee: Władysław Pryk (Kraków)

4 July 1946 2	Wisła Kraków	6–1	Groble Kraków	Kraków
18:30 CEST (UTC+2)	Cholewa; Wandas; Woźniak	Report	Nastaborski	Stadium: Stadion Cracovii; Attendance: 3,000; Referee: Julian Rutkowski (Kraków)

11 July 1946 3	Podgórze Kraków	0–3	Wisła Kraków	Kraków
18:00 CEST (UTC+2)		Report	Cholewa; Giergiel	Stadium: Stadion Cracovii

14 July 1946 4	Groble Kraków	3–5	Wisła Kraków	Kraków
18:00 CEST (UTC+2)	Trojan	Report	Giergiel; Cholewa	Stadium: Stadion Cracovii; Attendance: 4,000

18 July 1946 5	KS Borek	1–4	Wisła Kraków	Kraków
18:00 CEST (UTC+2)		Report		Stadium: Stadion Cracovii

25 July 1946 6	Wisła Kraków	6–1	Dębnicki KS	Kraków
18:00 CEST (UTC+2)		Report		Stadium: Stadion Cracovii

28 July 1946 7	Wisła Kraków	4–1	Tarnovia Tarnów	Kraków
18:00 CEST (UTC+2)	Woźniak (pen.); Legutko	Report	Pirych	Stadium: Stadion Wisły; Referee: Władysław Michalik (Kraków)

4 August 1946 8	Wisła Kraków	8–0	Fablok Chrzanów	Kraków
18:00 CEST (UTC+2)	Woźniak; Cholewa; Gracz	Report		Stadium: Stadion Wisły

11 August 1946 9	Wisła Kraków	6–1	Podgórze Kraków	Kraków
18:00 CEST (UTC+2)	Cisowski; Gracz; Cholewa	Report	Zaporowski	Stadium: Stadion Cracovii; Attendance: 5,000; Referee: Zbigniew Olewski (Kraków)

20 August 1946 10	Fablok Chrzanów	1–3	Wisła Kraków	Chrzanów
	Wójtowicz	Report	Woźniak; Cholewa; Gracz	Stadium: Stadion Fabloku; Referee: Franciszek Bartyzel (Kraków)

22 August 1946 11	Wisła Kraków	5–1	KS Borek	Kraków
		Report		Referee: Edward Bill (Kraków)

25 August 1946 12	Tarnovia Tarnów	2–1	Wisła Kraków	Tarnów
	Pirych I 24'; Kubik 87' (o.g.)	Report	Cholewa 55'	Attendance: 9,000; Referee: Roman Mohyła (Kraków)

=== Final round ===
29 August 1946 1	Garbarnia Kraków	0–2	Wisła Kraków	Kraków
17:00 CEST (UTC+2)		Report	Gracz 36'; Cholewa 65'	Stadium: Stadion Garbarni; Attendance: 8,000; Referee: Franciszek Bartyzel (Kraków)

1 September 1946 2	KS Cracovia	1–1	Wisła Kraków	Kraków
17:00 CEST (UTC+2)	E. Różankowski 15'	Report	Gracz 86'	Stadium: Stadion Cracovii; Attendance: 20,000; Referee: Julian Mytnik (Kraków)

5 September 1946 3	Wisła Kraków	3–1	Garbarnia Kraków	Kraków
16:30 CEST (UTC+2)	Cholewa 5', 39'; Woźniak 31'	Report	Skrzyński II ??' (pen.)	Stadium: Stadion Wisły; Attendance: 12,000

12 September 1946 4	Wisła Kraków	0–1	KS Cracovia	Kraków
16:30 CEST (UTC+2)		Report	E. Różankowski 29'	Stadium: Stadion Wisły; Attendance: 15,000; Referee: Roman Mohyła (Kraków)

14 September 1946 5	KS Cracovia	1–4	Wisła Kraków	Kraków
15:30 CEST (UTC+2)	Kletschka 21'	Report	Giergiel 30', 85'; Wandas 63'; Gracz 71' (pen.)	Stadium: Stadion Garbarni; Attendance: 20,000; Referee: Julian Mytnik (Kraków)

== Polish Football Championship ==
19 September 1946 2nd Round	Wisła Kraków	4–0	Czuwaj Przemyśl	Kraków
16:30 CEST (UTC+2)	Gracz 14', 89'; Woźniak 24'; Wandas 48'	Report		Stadium: Stadion Wisły; Attendance: 8,000; Referee: Edward Sperling (Łódź)

29 September 1946 Quarterfinal	Wisła Kraków	2–3	Polonia Warsaw	Kraków
16:00 CEST (UTC+2)	Gracz 31' (pen.); Cisowski 71'	Report	Ochmański 38'; Szularz 43', 89'	Stadium: Stadion Wisły; Attendance: 15,000; Referee: Łukasz Gruszka (Chorzów)

== Squad, appearances and goals ==
No.	Pos	Nat	Player	Total		Mistrzostwa Polski	
No.	Pos	Nat	Player	Apps	Goals	Apps	Goals
	GK	(Poland) POL	Jerzy Jurowicz	2	0	2+0	0
	DF	(Poland) POL	Tadeusz Kubik	2	0	2+0	0
	DF	(Poland) POL	Tadeusz Legutko	2	0	2+0	0
	DF	(Poland) POL	Stanisław Flanek	2	0	2+0	0
	MF	(Poland) POL	Adam Wapiennik	2	0	2+0	0
	MF	(Poland) POL	Jan Wapiennik	2	0	2+0	0
	MF	(Poland) POL	Andrzej Łyko	1	0	1+0	0
	FW	(Poland) POL	Mieczysław Gracz	2	3	2+0	3
	FW	(Poland) POL	Artur Woźniak	1	1	1+0	1
	FW	(Poland) POL	Eugeniusz Wandas	2	1	2+0	1
	FW	(Poland) POL	Kazimierz Cisowski	2	1	2+0	1
	MF	(Poland) POL	Władysław Giergiel	1	0	1+0	0
	FW	(Poland) POL	Zbigniew Jaskowski	1	0	1+0	0

=== Goalscorers ===
Place	Position	Nation	Name	Mistrzostwa Polski
1	FW	(Poland)	Mieczysław Gracz	3
1	FW	(Poland)	Artur Woźniak	1
1	FW	(Poland)	Eugeniusz Wandas	1
1	FW	(Poland)	Kazimierz Cisowski	1
			Total	6
