= 1947 Wisła Kraków season =

Wisła Kraków
1947 season
- Chairman: Tadeusz Orzelski
- Manager: Adam Walter
- Mistrzostwa Polski: 2nd

The 1947 season was Wisła Kraków's 39th year as a club.

== Friendlies ==
23 March 1947	RKS Zabłocie Żywiec (Poland)	1–2	(Poland) Wisła Kraków	Żywiec, Poland
	Obtułowicz	Report	Giergiel; Woźniak	Stadium: Stadion Zabłocia

7 April 1947	Garbarnia Kraków (Poland)	0–1	(Poland) Wisła Kraków	Kraków, Poland
16:00 CET (UTC+1)		Report	Jaskowski 20'	Stadium: Stadion Garbarni; Attendance: 3,000; Referee: Julian Rutkowski (Kraków)

4 May 1947	KS Cracovia (Poland)	0–3	(Poland) Wisła Kraków	Kraków, Poland
16:30 CEST (UTC+2)		Report	Kapusta 38'; Kohut 75', 80'	Stadium: Stadion Cracovii; Attendance: 7,000; Referee: Julian Mytnik (Kraków)

10 May 1947	Wisła Kraków (Poland)	5–2	(Hungary) Debreceni VSC	Kraków, Poland
18:00 CEST (UTC+2)	Gracz 19', ??', ??', 73'; Kohut 29'	Report	Kiss ??'; Szántó ??'	Stadium: Stadion Wisły; Attendance: 7,000; Referee: Julian Mytnik (Kraków)

24 May 1947	Wisła Kraków (Poland)	4–4	(Czechoslovakia) SK Nusle	Kraków, Poland
18:00 CEST (UTC+2)	Gracz 4', 5', 16'; Kohut 74'	Report	Capek 8' ? 35'; Miller 44', 55'	Stadium: Stadion Wisły; Attendance: 8,000; Referee: Zygmunt Chruściński (Kraków)

25 May 1947	Polonia Przemyśl (Poland)	0–3	(Poland) Wisła Kraków	Jarosław, Poland
		Report	Cisowski; Gracz; Giergiel	Stadium: Stadion JKS-u

26 May 1947	Jarosławski KS (Poland)	2–5	(Poland) Wisła Kraków	Jarosław, Poland
	Turczynowski; Streit (pen.)	Report	Rupa; Gracz; Jaskowski; Cisowski	Stadium: Stadion JKS-u

22 June 1947	RKU Sosnowiec (Poland)	3–3	(Poland) Wisła Kraków	Sosnowiec, Poland
	Słota; Stech	Report	Kohut; Cisowski

22 June 1947	Wisła Kraków (Poland)	5–0	(Poland) Garbarnia Kraków	Kraków, Poland
	Kohut; Mącznik; Kapusta	Report		Stadium: Stadion Wisły; Attendance: 10,000; Referee: Franciszek Bartyzel (Kraków)

22 July 1947	Gumownia Trzebinia (Poland)	0–2	(Poland) Wisła Kraków	Trzebinia, Poland
		Report	Kohut; Cisowski

1 August 1947	SK Nusle (Czechoslovakia)	2–4	(Poland) Wisła Kraków	Prague, Czechoslovakia
	Plíva; Miller	Report	Woźniak; Cisowski; Rupa

3 August 1947	SK Slaný (Czechoslovakia)	0–4	(Poland) Wisła Kraków	Prague, Czechoslovakia
		Report	Kohut; Giergiel; Cisowski

5 August 1947	SK Teplice-Šanov (Czechoslovakia)	2–3	(Poland) Wisła Kraków	Teplice, Czechoslovakia
		Report	Kohut; Giergiel

6 August 1947	OWKS Kraków (Poland)	4–2	(Poland) Wisła Kraków	Kraków, Poland
	Ziętkiewicz; Bąkowski; Majtyka; Markiewicz	Report	Rusek; Kapusta

27 September 1947	WUZ Jelenia Góra (Poland)	4–3	(Poland) Wisła Kraków	Jelenia Góra, Poland
	Piasecki; Baryłko; Bajer	Report	Cisowski; Kohut; M. Filek

12 October 1947	KS Cracovia (Poland)	3–0	(Poland) Wisła Kraków	Kraków, Poland
	Bobula; Szewczyk	Report		Stadium: Stadion Garbarni; Attendance: 3,000; Referee: Edward Bill (Kraków)

26 October 1947	Ruch Chorzów (Poland)	2–2	(Poland) Wisła Kraków	Chorzów, Poland
	Żurek; Baryla	Report	Cisowski; Kohut	Attendance: 2,000; Referee: Łukasz Gruszka (Chorzów)

28 October 1947	ŠK Žilina (Czechoslovakia)	10–2	(Poland) Wisła Kraków	Žilina, Czechoslovakia
		Report	Kohut

2 November 1947	KS Cracovia (Poland)	2–2	(Poland) Wisła Kraków	Kraków, Poland
	Szewczyk 4'; Bobula 25'; M. Jabłoński (red card) 64'	Report	Gracz 14'; Bąkowski 61'	Attendance: 12,000; Referee: Julian Mytnik (Kraków)

8 December 1947	Wisła Kraków (Poland)	1–0	(Poland) KS Cracovia	Kraków, Poland
11:45 CET (UTC+1)	Kohut 27'	Report		Stadium: Stadion Wisły; Attendance: 10,000; Referee: Franciszek Fronczyk (Tarnów)

=== Mixed teams ===
31 August 1947	Wisła / Garbarnia Kraków (Poland)	6–1	(Czechoslovakia) SK Libeň	Kraków, Poland
	Kohut 13'; Giergiel 19', 25'; Cisowski 61', 64', 81'	Report	Vokoun 47'

== Polish Football Championship ==
=== Group stage ===
30 March 1947 1	Wisła Kraków	3–2	Polonia Świdnica	Kraków
11:00 CET (UTC+1)	Gracz 9' (pen.), 69' (pen.); Woźniak 86'	Report	Majcher 48', 51'	Stadium: Stadion Wisły; Attendance: 4,000; Referee: Piotr Jędrzejczyk (Kielce)

13 April 1947 2	Wisła Kraków	3–1	Polonia Bytom	Kraków
16:00 CET (UTC+1)	Gracz 20'; Giergiel 35'; Cisowski 75'	Report	Kazimierowicz 10'	Stadium: Stadion Wisły; Attendance: 7,000; Referee: Józef Strzelecki (Rzeszów)

20 April 1947 3	Skra Częstochowa	0–5	Wisła Kraków	Częstochowa
		Report	Kohut 26', 75'; Jaskowski 68'; Gracz 83', 86' (pen.)	Stadium: Stadion Skry; Attendance: 6,000

27 April 1947 4	KKS Poznań	0–1	Wisła Kraków	Poznań
		Report	Kohut	Attendance: 7,000

18 May 1947 5	Wisła Kraków	16–0	PKS Motor Białystok	Kraków
18:00 CEST (UTC+2)	Kohut 1', 34', 69', 74'; Gracz 14', 41', 43', 53', 61', 90'; Rupa 22', 51', 64', 67', 82'; W. Filek 86'	Report		Stadium: Stadion Wisły; Referee: Mikołaj Fomin (Radom)

1 June 1947 6	Ognisko Siedlce	0–7	Wisła Kraków	Siedlce
		Report	Rupa; Kohut; Cisowski; Gracz	Stadium: Stadion Ogniska; Referee: Stefan Winiarski (Łódź)

15 June 1947 7	Polonia Warsaw	2–2	Wisła Kraków	Warsaw
	Świcarz 5'; Jaźnicki 65'	Report	Kohut 44', 80'	Stadium: Stadion Wojska Polskiego; Attendance: 20,000; Referee: Eugeniusz Kuc (Sosnowiec)

29 June 1947 8	Wisła Kraków	7–0	Szombierki Bytom	Kraków
18:45 CEST (UTC+2)	Kohut 13', 60', 78'; Gracz 25', 43' (pen.); Giergiel 30'; Rupa 36'	Report		Stadium: Stadion Wisły; Attendance: 5,000

6 July 1947 9	PKS Motor Białystok	0–9	Wisła Kraków	Białystok
		Report	Gracz 6', 20', 60'; Cisowski 22'; Kohut 45', 69', 73', 80'; Rupa 88'	Stadium: Stadion Motoru

13 July 1947 10	Wisła Kraków	5–0	KKS Poznań	Kraków
18:15 CEST (UTC+2)	Giergiel 3', 85'; Kohut 7', 76'; Gracz 46'	Report		Stadium: Stadion Wisły

27 July 1947 11	Szombierki Bytom	0–4	Wisła Kraków	Bytom
		Report	Giergiel 42', 59', 70'; Kohut 76'	Attendance: 12,000

10 August 1947 12	Wisła Kraków	9–1	Skra Częstochowa	Kraków
18:00 CEST (UTC+2)	Giergiel 8'; Gracz 25' (pen.), 30', 33', 59', 68', 74'; Kohut 56'; Woźniak 89'	Report	Ślęzak ??'	Stadium: Stadion Wisły; Attendance: 8,000

24 August 1947 13	Wisła Kraków	21–0	Ognisko Siedlce	Kraków
	Gracz; Kohut; Woźniak; Giergiel; Cisowski	Report		Stadium: Stadion Wisły; Attendance: 5,000

7 September 1947 14	Polonia Bytom	1–7	Wisła Kraków	Bytom
	Schmidt (pen.)	Report	Kohut 12', 59', 74'; Cisowski 23', 47'; Gracz 65', 78'	Stadium: Stadion Polonii; Attendance: 20,000; Referee: Edmund Sperling (Łódź)

21 September 1947 15	Wisła Kraków	2–1	Polonia Warsaw	Kraków
	Kohut 41', 87'	Report	Świcarz 27'; Szczepaniak (red card) 60'	Stadium: Stadion Wisły; Attendance: 20,000

28 September 1947 16	Polonia Świdnica	1–0	Wisła Kraków	Świdnica
	Maziura	Report		Referee: Władysław Przybysz (Bydgoszcz)

=== Final round ===
5 October 1947 1	Wisła Kraków	0–2	Warta Poznań	Kraków
16:30 CET (UTC+1)		Report	Gendera 41'; Gierak 81'	Stadium: Stadion Wisły; Attendance: 15,000; Referee: Marian Nalepa (Zabrze)

9 November 1947 2	AKS Chorzów	1–4	Wisła Kraków	Chorzów
	Wieczorek 60'	Report	Kohut 13'; Gracz 32', 81', 85'; Giergiel (red card) 65'	Attendance: 12,000; Referee: Stefan Winiarski (Łódź)

16 November 1947 3	Wisła Kraków	3–0	AKS Chorzów	Kraków
11:30 CET (UTC+1)	Gracz 72'; Snopkowski 85'; Legutko 89'	Report		Stadium: Stadion Wisły; Referee: Józef Strzelecki (Rzeszów)

30 November 1947 4	Warta Poznań	5–2	Wisła Kraków	Poznań
	Gendera 12'; Smólski 13'; Czapczyk 15', 31'; Skrzypniak 29'	Report	Cisowski 5'; Bąkowski 61'	Stadium: Stadion Warty; Attendance: 17,000; Referee: Edmund Sperling (Łódź)

== Squad, appearances and goals ==
No.	Pos	Nat	Player	Total		Mistrzostwa Polski	
No.	Pos	Nat	Player	Apps	Goals	Apps	Goals
	GK	(Poland) POL	Jerzy Jurowicz	20	0	20+0	0
	GK	(Poland) POL	Przemysław Smolarek	1	0	0+1	0
	DF	(Poland) POL	Michał Filek	16	0	16+0	0
	DF	(Poland) POL	Stanisław Flanek	16	0	16+0	0
	DF	(Poland) POL	Tadeusz Legutko	17	1	17+0	1
	MF	(Poland) POL	Władysław Giergiel	19	10	19+0	10
	MF	(Poland) POL	Andrzej Łyko	1	0	1+0	0
	MF	(Poland) POL	Leszek Snopkowski	4	1	4+0	1
	MF	(Poland) POL	Adam Wapiennik	17	0	17+0	0
	MF	(Poland) POL	Jan Wapiennik	19	0	19+0	0
	FW	(Poland) POL	Mieczysław Bąkowski	1	1	1+0	1
	FW	(Poland) POL	Kazimierz Cisowski	20	8	20+0	8
	FW	(Poland) POL	Władysław Filek	4	1	4+0	1
	FW	(Poland) POL	Mieczysław Gracz	18	37	18+0	37
	FW	(Poland) POL	Zbigniew Jaskowski	4	1	4+0	1
	FW	(Poland) POL	Józef Kohut	19	34	19+0	34
	FW	(Poland) POL	Tadeusz Mącznik	1	0	1+0	0
	FW	(Poland) POL	Mieczysław Rupa	12	9	12+0	9
	FW	(Poland) POL	Artur Woźniak	12	7	12+0	7

=== Goalscorers ===
Place	Position	Nation	Name	Mistrzostwa Polski
1	FW	(Poland)	Mieczysław Gracz	37
2	FW	(Poland)	Józef Kohut	34
3	MF	(Poland)	Władysław Giergiel	10
4	FW	(Poland)	Mieczysław Rupa	9
5	FW	(Poland)	Kazimierz Cisowski	8
6	FW	(Poland)	Artur Woźniak	7
7	MF	(Poland)	Leszek Snopkowski	1
7	FW	(Poland)	Zbigniew Jaskowski	1
7	FW	(Poland)	Władysław Filek	1
7	FW	(Poland)	Mieczysław Bąkowski	1
7	DF	(Poland)	Tadeusz Legutko	1
			TOTALS	110

=== Disciplinary record ===
Name	Nation	Position	Mistrzostwa Polski	Total
Name	Nation	Position	Sent off (straight red)	Sent off (straight red)
Władysław Giergiel	(Poland)	MF	1	1
