= 1938 Wisła Kraków season =

Wisła Kraków
1938 season
- Chairman: Tadeusz Orzelski
- Ekstraklasa: 3rd
- Top goalscorer: Mieczysław Gracz (11 goals)

The 1938 season was Wisła Kraków's 30th year as a club.

== Friendlies ==
30 January 1938	Wisła Kraków (Poland)	6–1	(Poland) Krowodrza Kraków	Kraków, Poland
11:15 CET (UTC+1)	Ogrodziński; Woźniak; Habowski; Gracz	Report	Psonka	Stadium: Stadion Wisły; Attendance: 500

6 February 1938	Wisła Kraków (Poland)	11–0	(Poland) Kabel Kraków	Kraków, Poland
11:15 CET (UTC+1)	Woźniak; Gracz; Ogrodziński; Habowski	Report		Stadium: Stadion Wisły

13 February 1938	Wisła Kraków (Poland)	9–0	(Poland) Czarni Kraków	Kraków, Poland
11:15 CET (UTC+1)	Szumilas; Woźniak; Giergiel	Report		Stadium: Stadion Wisły

20 February 1938	Wisła Kraków (Poland)	5–0	(Poland) Grzegórzecki KS	Kraków, Poland
	Ogrodziński; Woźniak; Gracz; Łyko	Report		Referee: Franciszek Bartyzel (Kraków)

27 February 1938	Wisła Kraków (Poland)	12–0	(Poland) Korona Kraków	Kraków, Poland
11:30 CET (UTC+1)	Habowski; Woźniak; Gracz; Łyko; Ogrodziński	Report		Stadium: Stadion Wisły; Attendance: 500

6 March 1938	Starachowice (Poland)	0–5	(Poland) Wisła Kraków	Starachowice, Poland
		Report	Woźniak; Giergiel

13 March 1938	Wisła Kraków (Poland)	4–1	(Poland) PPW Katowice	Kraków, Poland
11:15 CET (UTC+1)	Gracz; Woźniak	Report	Malina (pen.)	Stadium: Stadion Wisły; Attendance: 1,000

20 March 1938	Wisła Kraków (Poland)	4–0	(Poland) Slavia Ruda Śląska	Kraków, Poland
11:15 CET (UTC+1)	Woźniak; Gracz; Hausner	Report		Stadium: Stadion Wisły; Attendance: 1,000

27 March 1938	Bielsko (Poland)	1–4	(Poland) Wisła Kraków	Bielsko, Poland
	Gajda	Report	Woźniak; Habowski; Łyko; Ogrodziński	Stadium: Boisko BBTS; Attendance: 1,500

3 April 1938	Unia Sosnowiec (Poland)	2–1	(Poland) Wisła Kraków	Sosnowiec, Poland
15:00 CET (UTC+1)	Bartuś	Report	Woźniak	Stadium: Boisko Unii; Attendance: 1,000

18 April 1938	Wisła Kraków (Poland)	1–3	(Hungary) Kispest FC	Kraków, Poland
16:15 CET (UTC+1)	Gracz 25'	Report	Olajkár 62'; Ujvári 73'; Gytrai (??)	Stadium: Stadion Wisły; Attendance: 3,000; Referee: Karol Zapiór (Kraków)

5 June 1938	Kadimah Borysław (Poland)	1–2	(Poland) Wisła Kraków	Borysław, Poland
		Report
Note: The match lasted 45 minutes.

5 June 1938	Strzelec Borysław (Poland)	0–1	(Poland) Wisła Kraków	Borysław, Poland
		Report
Note: The match lasted 45 minutes.

6 June 1938	Junak Drohobycz (Poland)	2–2	(Poland) Wisła Kraków	Drohobycz, Poland
	Makomaski 20'; Zdobylak 22'	Report	Cholewa 53'; Gracz 66'	Attendance: 3,000; Referee: Władysław Chomyszyniec (Stryj)

17 July 1938	Wysokie Tatry Zakopane (Poland)	2–3	(Poland) Wisła Kraków	Zakopane, Poland
	Cisowski; Szatkowski	Report	M. Filek; Łyko ?	Referee: Zygmunt Rosenfeld (Bielsko)

21 July 1938	Resovia (Poland)	4–1	(Poland) Wisła Kraków	Rzeszów, Poland
	Kluz; Kotelnicki	Report	Łyko

7 August 1938	Wisła Kraków (Poland)	8–0	(Poland) Zwierzyniecki KS	Kraków, Poland
	Filek; Łyko; Kidacki; Giergiel	Report		Stadium: Stadion Wisły

15 August 1938	Wisła Kraków (Poland)	11–1	(Poland) WKS Ikar	Kraków, Poland
	Gracz 5', 10', 19', 67'; Obtułowicz (??), 48', 65', 77'; W. Filek 52'; Łyko (??); Habowski (??)	Report	God 71'	Stadium: Stadion Wisły; Attendance: 500

27 September 1938	Tarnów (Poland)	1–3	(Poland) Wisła Kraków	Tarnów, Poland
		Report

23 October 1938	KS Chełmek (Poland)	0–4	(Poland) Wisła Kraków	Chełmek, Poland
		Report

13 November 1938	Wisła Kraków (Poland)	3–1	(Poland) Garbarnia Kraków	Kraków, Poland
16:15 CET (UTC+1)	Woźniak 5', 46'; Gracz 78'	Report	Nowak 44'	Stadium: Stadion Wisły; Attendance: 800

== Ekstraklasa ==
10 April 1938 1	Wisła Kraków	0–0	AKS Chorzów	Kraków
16:15 CET (UTC+1)		Report		Stadium: Stadion Wisły; Attendance: 5,000; Referee: Zygmunt Lange (Łódź)

24 April 1938 2	ŁKS Łódź	0–0	Wisła Kraków	Łódź
		Report		Stadium: Stadion ŁKS-u; Attendance: 4,000; Referee: Franciszek Krukowski (Warsaw)

1 May 1938 3	Wisła Kraków	2–2	KS Cracovia	Kraków
17:00 CET (UTC+1)	Gracz 4', 21'	Report	Strąk 8'; Roczniak 25'	Stadium: Stadion Wisły; Attendance: 8,000; Referee: Wacław Kuchar (Lwów)

8 May 1938 4	Warta Poznań	6–2	Wisła Kraków	Poznań
17:15 CET (UTC+1)	Gendera 2', 52', 64'; Scherfke 60', 65'; Kaźmierczak 77'	Report	Gracz 26'; Habowski 82'	Stadium: Stadion Warty; Attendance: 4,000; Referee: Zdzisław Hasselbusch (Warsaw)

15 May 1938 5	Wisła Kraków	3–1	Ruch Hajduki Wielkie	Kraków
17:15 CET (UTC+1)	Cholewa 14'; Gracz 62'; Habowski 86'	Report	Peterek 30'	Stadium: Stadion Wisły; Attendance: 6,000; Referee: Mieczysław Walczak (Warsaw)

26 May 1938 6	Śmigły Wilno	1–0	Wisła Kraków	Wilno
	Ballosek 48'	Report		Stadium: Stadion 1 PP Legionów; Attendance: 3,000; Referee: Wacław Kuchar (Lwów)

12 June 1938 7	Wisła Kraków	3–1	KS Warszawianka	Kraków
17:45 CET (UTC+1)	Gracz 20', 85'; Cholewa 74'	Report	Święcki 41'	Stadium: Stadion Wisły; Attendance: 2,000; Referee: Antoni Linke (Katowice)

19 June 1938 8	Wisła Kraków	1–0	Pogoń Lwów	Kraków
17:45 CET (UTC+1)	Łyko 40'	Report		Stadium: Stadion Wisły; Attendance: 3,000; Referee: Roman Fass (Warsaw)

26 June 1938 9	Pogoń Lwów	2–1	Wisła Kraków	Lwów
	Szumilas 53' (o.g.); Szmyd 64' (pen.)	Report	Gracz 69'	Stadium: Stadion Pogoni; Attendance: 3,000; Referee: Alfons Raettig (Łódź)

3 July 1938 10	Polonia Warsaw	2–3	Wisła Kraków	Warsaw
	Kula 30', 60'	Report	Woźniak 62'; Habowski 83'; Gracz 86'	Stadium: Stadion Polonii; Attendance: 3,000; Referee: Wawrzyniec Staliński (Poznań)

21 August 1938 11	KS Warszawianka	2–3	Wisła Kraków	Warsaw
	Knioła 9', 14'	Report	Woźniak 43', 54'; Gracz 59'	Stadium: Stadion Wojska Polskiego; Attendance: 2,000; Referee: Wacław Kuchar (Lwów)

28 August 1938 12	Wisła Kraków	4–1	Śmigły Wilno	Kraków
16:45 CET (UTC+1)	W. Filek 11'; Gracz 51'; Woźniak 56', 81'; Łyko (penalty missed) 72'	Report	Tumasz 73' (pen.)	Stadium: Stadion Wisły; Attendance: 3,000; Referee: Łukasz Gruszka (Chorzów)

4 September 1938 13	Ruch Hajduki Wielkie	4–2	Wisła Kraków	Hajduki Wielkie
16:30 CET (UTC+1)	Wilimowski 4'; Wodarz 8'; Peterek 38' (pen.), 73' (pen.)	Report	Woźniak 16'; W. Filek 22'	Stadium: Stadion Ruchu; Attendance: 15,000; Referee: Wacław Kuchar (Lwów)

11 September 1938 14	Wisła Kraków	5–7	Warta Poznań	Kraków
16:00 CET (UTC+1)	Łyko 6', 15' (pen.); Woźniak 61'; W. Filek 82'; Habowski 89'	Report	Kaźmierczak 18'; Gendera 21', 83', 86'; Schreier 25', 70'; Scherfke 43'	Stadium: Stadion Wisły; Attendance: 3,000; Referee: Walenty Gerblich (Katowice)

2 October 1938 15	KS Cracovia	2–1	Wisła Kraków	Kraków
15:00 CET (UTC+1)	Strąk 52'; Zembaczyński 77'	Report	Gracz 55'	Stadium: Stadion Cracovii; Attendance: 8,000; Referee: Roman Sawaryn (Lwów)

9 October 1938 16	Wisła Kraków	4–2	Polonia Warsaw	Kraków
15:00 CET (UTC+1)	Łyko 16' (pen.); W. Filek 23', 52'; Woźniak 24'	Report	Pieniążek 40'; Przybysz 82'	Stadium: Stadion Wisły; Attendance: 3,000; Referee: Jan Stronczek (Świętochłowice)

16 October 1938 17	AKS Chorzów	0–0	Wisła Kraków	Chorzów
		Report		Stadium: Stadion AKS-u; Attendance: 6,000; Referee: Alfons Raettig (Łódź)

30 October 1938 18	Wisła Kraków	7–3	ŁKS Łódź	Kraków
11:30 CET (UTC+1)	Łyko 9' (pen.), 43'; Woźniak 27', 77'; W. Filek 40', 85'; Gałecki 62' (o.g.)	Report	Tadeusiewicz 5', 14'; Koczewski 69'	Stadium: Stadion Wisły; Attendance: 1,000; Referee: Antoni Linke (Katowice)

== Squad, appearances and goals ==
No.	Pos	Nat	Player	Total		I Liga	
No.	Pos	Nat	Player	Apps	Goals	Apps	Goals
	GK	(Poland) POL	Taduesz Brudny	5	0	4+1	0
	GK	(Poland) POL	Jerzy Jurowicz	12	0	11+1	0
	GK	(Poland) POL	Mieczysław Koczwara	4	0	3+1	0
	DF	(Poland) POL	Michał Filek	15	0	15+0	0
	DF	(Poland) POL	Taduesz Legutko	1	0	1+0	0
	DF	(Poland) POL	Stanisław Liszka	1	0	1+0	0
	DF	(Poland) POL	Henryk Serafin	1	0	1+0	0
	DF	(Poland) POL	Alojzy Sitko	16	0	16+0	0
	DF	(Poland) POL	Władysław Szumilas	18	0	18+0	0
	MF	(Poland) POL	Wiktor Cholewa	5	2	5+0	2
	MF	(Poland) POL	Antoni Dzierwa	3	0	3+0	0
	MF	(Poland) POL	Franciszek Gierczyński	17	0	17+0	0
	MF	(Poland) POL	Józef Kotlarczyk	18	0	18+0	0
	FW	(Poland) POL	Władysław Filek	12	7	12+0	7
	FW	(Poland) POL	Mieczysław Gracz	18	11	18+0	11
	FW	(Poland) POL	Bolesław Habowski	18	4	18+0	4
	FW	(Poland) POL	Antoni Łyko	18	6	18+0	6
	FW	(Poland) POL	Antoni Ogrodziński	4	0	4+0	0
	FW	(Poland) POL	Artur Woźniak	15	10	15+0	10

=== Goalscorers ===
Place	Position	Nation	Name	I Liga
1	FW	(Poland)	Mieczysław Gracz	11
2	FW	(Poland)	Artur Woźniak	10
3	FW	(Poland)	Władysław Filek	7
4	FW	(Poland)	Antoni Łyko	6
5	FW	(Poland)	Bolesław Habowski	4
6	FW	(Poland)	Wiktor Cholewa	2
			TOTALS	40
