= 1939 Wisła Kraków season =

Wisła Kraków
1939 season
- Chairman: Tadeusz Orzelski
- Manager: Otakar Škvajn-Mazal
- Ekstraklasa: unfinished
- Top goalscorer: Artur Woźniak (12 goals)

The 1939 season was Wisła Kraków's 31st year as a club.

== Friendlies ==
12 February 1939	Wisła Kraków (Poland)	4–2	(Poland) Kabel Kraków	Kraków, Poland
11:15 CET (UTC+1)	Hausner; Woźniak; Szymczykiewicz	Report		Stadium: Stadion Wisły

19 February 1939	Wisła Kraków (Poland)	4–1	(Poland) Zwierzyniecki KS	Kraków, Poland
11:30 CET (UTC+1)	Hausner; Gierczyński; Giergiel	Report	Pamuła	Stadium: Stadion Wisły

26 February 1939	Wisła Kraków (Poland)	5–1	(Poland) Olsza Kraków	Kraków, Poland
11:30 CET (UTC+1)	Woźniak	Report	Stankusz	Stadium: Stadion Wisły

5 March 1939	Wisła Kraków (Poland)	6–1	(Poland) Krowodrza Kraków	Kraków, Poland
11:30 CET (UTC+1)	Woźniak; Hausner; Gracz	Report	Psonka	Stadium: Stadion Wisły; Attendance: 1,000

19 March 1939	Wisła Kraków (Poland)	7–1	(Poland) Garbarnia Kraków	Kraków, Poland
11:30 CET (UTC+1)	Szymczykiewicz; Gracz; Woźniak; Gierczyński (red card) ??'	Report	Psonka	Stadium: Stadion Wisły; Attendance: 500

26 March 1939	Wisła Kraków (Poland)	8–4	(Poland) WKS Kraków	Kraków, Poland
11:00 CET (UTC+1)		Report		Stadium: Stadion Wisły

9 April 1939	Wisła Kraków (Poland)	1–0	(Hungary) Elektromos FC	Kraków, Poland
	Giergiel 25' (pen.)	Report		Stadium: Stadion Wisły; Attendance: 4,000; Referee: Jakub Seidner (Kraków)

28 May 1939	Junak Drohobycz (Poland)	2–4	(Poland) Wisła Kraków	Lwów, Poland
15:00 CET (UTC+1)	Makomaski	Report	Woźniak; Cholewa; Jó. Kotlarczyk	Stadium: Stadion Pogoni; Referee: Roman Sawaryn (Lwów)

29 May 1939	Pogoń Lwów (Poland)	2–1	(Poland) Wisła Kraków	Lwów, Poland
17:30 CET (UTC+1)	Mich. Matyas; Wolanin	Report	Woźniak	Stadium: Stadion Pogoni; Referee: Oskar Kurzweil (Lwów)

11 June 1939	Repr. Zagłębia Dąbrowskiego (Poland)	0–6	(Poland) Wisła Kraków	Będzin, Poland
17:00 CET (UTC+1)		Report	Hausner ??'; Woźniak 50', 81'; Giergiel 69'; Gracz 89', 90'	Stadium: Stadion TS Sarmacja; Attendance: 2,000

17 July 1939	Polonia Przemyśl (Poland)	4–4	(Poland) Wisła Kraków	Przemyśl, Poland
	Korsak; Śliwa; Klein	Report	W. Filek; Giergiel; Cholewa

23 July 1939	Wisła Kraków (Poland)	7–4	(Czechoslovakia) Uchodźcy Czescy	Kraków, Poland
18:00 CET (UTC+1)	Cholewa; Obtułowicz; Rupa; W. Filek	Report	Michal; Karpatyi; Risanek	Stadium: Stadion Wisły; Attendance: 2,000; Referee: Leopold Heitner (Kraków)

30 July 1939	Wisła Kraków (Poland)	7–2	(Poland) WKS Ikar	Kraków, Poland
15:45 CET (UTC+1)	Gracz; Obtułowicz; Legutko; Janik	Report		Stadium: Stadion Wisły; Attendance: 1,000

6 August 1939	Wisła Kraków (Poland)	1–0	(Poland) KS Cracovia	Kraków, Poland
16:00 CET (UTC+1)	Giergiel 15'	Report		Stadium: Stadion Wisły; Attendance: 3,500

13 August 1939	Makkabi Kraków (Poland)	1–7	(Poland) Wisła Kraków	Kraków, Poland
17:00 CET (UTC+1)	Still	Report	Obtułowicz; Kozłowski; Giergiel; Gracz	Stadium: Stadion Makkabi; Attendance: 1,000; Referee: Franciszek Bartyzel (Kraków)

22 October 1939	Krowodrza Kraków (Poland)	1–3	(Poland) Wisła Kraków	Bronowice, Kraków, Poland
	Wrona	Report	Giergiel; Hausner; Cholewa

== Ekstraklasa ==
The championship was unfinished because of the Nazi German attack on Poland which triggered the Second World War.

2 April 1939 1	Wisła Kraków	2–1	Polonia Warsaw	Kraków
16:00 CET (UTC+1)	W. Filek 5'; Woźniak 40'; Szumilas (red card) 70'	Report	Kisieliński 75' (pen.)	Stadium: Stadion Wisły; Attendance: 3,500; Referee: Roman Sawaryn (Lwów)

16 April 1939 2	Union Touring Łódź	1–3	Wisła Kraków	Łódź
	Świętosławski 33' (pen.)	Report	Woźniak 28', 66'; Hausner 76'	Stadium: Stadion Unionu; Attendance: 3,000; Referee: Teofil Konieczka (Bydgoszcz)

23 April 1939 3	Warta Poznań	4–1	Wisła Kraków	Poznań
16:30 CET (UTC+1)	Scherfke 10'; Nawrat 54'; Gandera 59'; Kaźmierczak 85'	Report	W. Filek 75'	Stadium: Stadion Warty; Attendance: 4,000; Referee: Aleksander Pichelski (Warsaw)

3 May 1939 4	Wisła Kraków	2–1	Pogoń Lwów	Kraków
16:15 CET (UTC+1)	Cholewa 44', 59'	Report	Wolanin 21'	Stadium: Stadion Wisły; Attendance: 4,000; Referee: Karol Bergtal (Warsaw)

7 May 1939 5	Wisła Kraków	5–1	KS Cracovia	Kraków
17:00 CET (UTC+1)	Giergiel 1', 25', 77'; Woźniak 36'; Cholewa 48'	Report	Góra 42'	Stadium: Stadion Wisły; Attendance: 6,000; Referee: Roman Fass (Warsaw)

14 May 1939 6	AKS Chorzów	3–3	Wisła Kraków	Chorzów
17:15 CET (UTC+1)	Spodzieja 49', 56'; Pytel 67'	Report	Cholewa 17'; Woźniak 65', 89'	Stadium: Stadion AKS-u; Attendance: 3,000; Referee: Zygmunt Kowalski (Łódź)

21 May 1939 7	Garbarnia Kraków	1–1	Wisła Kraków	Kraków
17:15 CET (UTC+1)	Skrzyński 17'	Report	W. Filek 13'	Stadium: Stadion Garbarni; Attendance: 6,000; Referee: Mieczysław Walczak (Warsaw)

8 June 1939 8	Wisła Kraków	0–1	Ruch Hajduki Wielkie	Kraków
17:30 CET (UTC+1)		Report	Wilimowski 76'	Stadium: Stadion Wisły; Attendance: 7,000; Referee: Zygmunt Lange (Łódź)

18 June 1939 9	KS Warszawianka	0–1	Wisła Kraków	Warsaw
		Report	Cholewa 58'	Stadium: Stadion Wojska Polskiego; Attendance: 2,800; Referee: Władysław Chomyszyniec (Stryj)

25 June 1939 10	Polonia Warsaw	5–4	Wisła Kraków	Warsaw
	Pieniążek 1'; Jaźnicki 3', 40', 75'; Stańczuk 15'	Report	W. Filek 6'; Woźniak 25', 41'; Hausner 55'	Stadium: Stadion Polonii; Attendance: 6,000; Referee: Łukasz Gruszka (Chorzów)

2 July 1939 11	Wisła Kraków	5–0	Warta Poznań	Kraków
17:45 CET (UTC+1)	Ofierzyński 25' (o.g.); Woźniak 32', 35', 59'; Gracz 82'	Report		Stadium: Stadion Wisły; Attendance: 3,000; Referee: Franciszek Krukowski (Warsaw)

20 August 1939 12	Wisła Kraków	4–2	KS Warszawianka	Kraków
17:00 CET (UTC+1)	Woźniak 12'; Gracz 35'; Giergiel 80', 82'	Report	Stępień 15'; Baran 24'	Stadium: Stadion Wisły; Attendance: 3,000; Referee: Władysław Szyba (Lwów)

== Squad, appearances and goals ==
No.	Pos	Nat	Player	Total		I Liga	
No.	Pos	Nat	Player	Apps	Goals	Apps	Goals
	GK	(Poland) POL	Taduesz Brudny	1	0	1+0	0
	GK	(Poland) POL	Jerzy Jurowicz	2	0	1+1	0
	GK	(Poland) POL	Mieczysław Koczwara	10	0	10+0	0
	DF	(Poland) POL	Tadeusz Legutko	11	0	11+0	0
	DF	(Poland) POL	Henryk Serafin	12	0	12+0	0
	DF	(Poland) POL	Władysław Szumilas	12	0	12+0	0
	MF	(Poland) POL	Franciszek Gierczyński	1	0	1+0	0
	MF	(Poland) POL	Józef Kotlarczyk	12	0	12+0	0
	MF	(Poland) POL	Stanisław Liszka	12	0	12+0	0
	FW	(Poland) POL	Wiktor Cholewa	6	5	6+0	5
	FW	(Poland) POL	Władysław Filek	10	4	10+0	4
	FW	(Poland) POL	Władysław Giergiel	12	5	12+0	5
	FW	(Poland) POL	Mieczysław Gracz	11	2	11+0	2
	FW	(Poland) POL	Franciszek Hausner	8	2	8+0	2
	FW	(Poland) POL	Kazimierz Obtułowicz	1	0	1+0	0
	FW	(Poland) POL	Artur Woźniak	12	12	12+0	12

=== Goalscorers ===
Place	Position	Nation	Name	I Liga
1	FW	(Poland)	Artur Woźniak	12
2	FW	(Poland)	Wiktor Cholewa	5
2	FW	(Poland)	Władysław Giergiel	5
4	FW	(Poland)	Władysław Filek	4
5	FW	(Poland)	Mieczysław Gracz	2
5	FW	(Poland)	Franciszek Hausner	2
			Total	30

=== Disciplinary record ===
Name	Nation	Position	Ekstraklasa	Total
Name	Nation	Position	Sent off (straight red)	Sent off (straight red)
Władysław Szumilas	(Poland)	DF	1	1
