= 1945 Wisła Kraków season =

37th season of football club Wisła Kraków

Wisła Kraków
1945 season
- Chairman: Tadeusz Orzelski
- Puchar WSS: Semifinal

The 1945 season was Wisła Kraków's 37th year as a club.

== Friendlies ==
28 January 1945	Wisła Kraków (Poland)	2–0	(Poland) KS Cracovia	Kraków, Poland
	Filo (o.g.); Giergiel	Report		Stadium: Stadion Wisły; Referee: Stanisław Jesionka (Kraków)
Note: The match lasted 2 x 30 minutes

4 March 1945	Olsza Kraków (Poland)	0–10	(Poland) Wisła Kraków	Kraków, Poland
11:15 CET (UTC+1)		Report		Stadium: Stadion Olszy

18 March 1945	Wisła Kraków (Poland)	7–1	(Poland) Zwierzyniecki KS	Kraków, Poland
11:15 CET (UTC+1)	Legutko 20', 89'; Gracz 57', 64', ??'; Kaleta ??'; Cholewa ??'	Report	Panek 23'	Stadium: Stadion Wisły; Referee: Julian Mytnik (Kraków)

25 March 1945	Wisła Kraków (Poland)	6–1	(Poland) Juvenia Kraków	Kraków, Poland
15:00 CET (UTC+1)	Cholewa; Gracz; Cisowski	Report	Suchodolski	Stadium: Stadion Wisły

2 April 1945	Wisła Kraków (Poland)	1–1	(Poland) Garbarnia Kraków	Kraków, Poland
	Cholewa	Report	Bystroń	Stadium: Stadion Wisły; Attendance: 5,000

15 April 1945	Wisła Kraków (Poland)	8–0	(Poland) Dąbski KS	Kraków, Poland
11:00 CET (UTC+1)		Report		Stadium: Stadion Wisły; Attendance: 3,500; Referee: Kazimierz Seichter (Kraków)

19 April 1945	Wisła Kraków (Poland)	12–1	(France) Repr. Jeńców Francuskich	Kraków, Poland
16:15 CET (UTC+1)	Gracz; Wandas; Cisowski; Giergiel; Cholewa; Legutko; Waśko	Report		Stadium: Stadion Wisły; Attendance: 2,500

28 April 1945	Wisła Kraków (Poland)	5–1	(Poland) Łobzowianka Łobzów	Kraków, Poland
	Cholewa; Gracz; Cisowski; Bandt	Report

3 May 1945	Czarni Kraków (Poland)	2–8	(Poland) Wisła Kraków	Kraków, Poland
16:30 CEST (UTC+2)		Report		Stadium: Stadion Czarnych

13 May 1945	Wisła Kraków (Poland)	3–3	(Poland) Korona Kraków	Kraków, Poland
17:00 CEST (UTC+2)		Report		Stadium: Stadion Wisły; Referee: Roman Mohyła (Kraków)

27 May 1945	Wisła Kraków (Poland)	16–0	(Poland) Wieczysta Kraków	Kraków, Poland
	Gracz; Cholewa; Wandas; Cisowski; M. Filek	Report

31 May 1945	Wisła Kraków (Poland)	4–1	(Poland) Repr. Szkoły Podchorążych	Kraków, Poland
17:45 CEST (UTC+2)	Wandas; Cholewa; Trap	Report		Stadium: Stadion Wisły

10 June 1945	Wisła Kraków (Poland)	4–0	(Poland) Garbarnia Kraków	Kraków, Poland
18:00 CEST (UTC+2)	Gracz 17'; Giergiel 51', 88'; Cholewa 54'	Report		Stadium: Stadion Wisły; Attendance: 17,000; Referee: Kazimierz Seichter (Kraków)

14 June 1945	Wisła Kraków (Poland)	5–2	(Poland) Łagiewianka Kraków	Kraków, Poland
18:00 CEST (UTC+2)		Report		Stadium: Stadion Wisły

17 June 1945	Wisła Kraków (Poland)	5–1	(Poland) WKS Warszawa	Kraków, Poland
18:00 CEST (UTC+2)	Gracz 12'; Giergiel 31'; Cholewa 58', 89'; Woźniak 67'	Report	Hawalewicz 60'	Stadium: Stadion Wisły; Attendance: 15,000; Referee: Władysław Pryk (Kraków)

29 June 1945	Łobzowianka Łobzów (Poland)	2–1	(Poland) Wisła Kraków	Kraków, Poland
11:30 CEST (UTC+2)	Malicki; Filo	Report	Woźniak	Stadium: Stadion Łobzowianki

1 July 1945	Wisła Zakopane (Poland)	0–9	(Poland) Wisła Kraków	Zakopane, Poland
		Report

5 July 1945	Dębnicki KS (Poland)	0–8	(Poland) Wisła Kraków	Kraków, Poland
		Report	Gracz; Giergiel; Cholewa; Woźniak

8 July 1945	Wisła Kraków (Poland)	4–1	(Poland) Fablok Chrzanów	Kraków, Poland
	Gracz; Cholewa	Report	Likus

10 July 1945	Wisła Kraków (Poland)	8–1	(Poland) Orzeł Częstochowa	Kraków, Poland
18:00 CEST (UTC+2)	Cisowski; Cholewa; Trap; Giergiel; Legutko; Woźniak	Report	Waśko	Stadium: Stadion Wisły; Attendance: 2,000

15 July 1945	Wisła Kraków (Poland)	1–2	(Poland) KS Cracovia	Kraków, Poland
18:00 CEST (UTC+2)	Cholewa 6'	Report	Pawlik 16'; Korbas 36'	Stadium: Stadion Wisły; Attendance: 18,000

29 July 1945	Wisła Kraków (Poland)	2–4	(Czechoslovakia) SK Slezská Ostrava	Kraków, Poland
18:00 CEST (UTC+2)	Gracz 5' (pen.); Cisowski 27'	Report	Blačinský 25'; Bouzek 41', 77'; Radimec 73'	Stadium: Stadion Wisły; Attendance: 15,000; Referee: Władysław Giergiel (Kraków)

5 August 1945	Wisła Kraków (Poland)	5–1	(Poland) Ruch Chorzów	Kraków, Poland
18:00 CEST (UTC+2)	Gracz 35', 60'; Cholewa 50'; Kohut 73', 88'	Report	Zenger 20'	Stadium: Stadion Wisły; Attendance: 9,000; Referee: Roman Mohyła (Kraków)

12 August 1945	Wisła Kraków (Poland)	9–0	(Poland) KS Warszawianka	Kraków, Poland
15:00 CEST (UTC+2)	Kohut 14', 88'; Wandas 17', 74'; Cholewa 25', 42', 83', 85'; Cisowski 80'	Report		Stadium: Stadion Wisły; Attendance: 6,000

26 August 1945	Wisła Kraków (Poland)	2–0	(Poland) KS Cracovia	Kraków, Poland
17:30 CEST (UTC+2)	Gracz 43'; Kohut 79'	Report		Stadium: Stadion Wisły; Attendance: 18,000

2 September 1945	Wisła Kraków (Poland)	1–6	(Czechoslovakia) SK Slavia Prague	Kraków, Poland
	Kohut 33'	Report	Bican 12', 36', ??', 87'; Žďárský 20'; Kopecký 54'	Stadium: Stadion Wisły; Attendance: 20,000; Referee: Kazimierz Seichter (Kraków)

22 September 1945	ZZK Łódź (Poland)	2–2	(Poland) Wisła Kraków	Łódź, Poland
	Lewandowski 3', 84'	Report	Kohut 36'; Giergiel 64'	Attendance: 6,000

23 September 1945	Milicyjny KS Łódź (Poland)	2–9	(Poland) Wisła Kraków	Łódź, Poland
	Ochęcki; Jankowski	Report	Gracz; Giergiel; Wandas; Kohut; Legutko; Trap

29 September 1945	Polonia Bytom (Poland)	0–5	(Poland) Wisła Kraków	Katowice, Poland
		Report	Wandas; Kohut; Gracz

30 September 1945	Ruch Chorzów (Poland)	0–1	(Poland) Wisła Kraków	Katowice, Poland
		Report	Gracz

7 October 1945	Jarosławski KS (Poland)	0–2	(Poland) Wisła Kraków	Jarosław, Poland
19:00 CEST (UTC+2)		Report		Attendance: 2,000

8 October 1945	Czarni Przeworsk (Poland)	0–4	(Poland) Wisła Kraków	Przeworsk, Poland
		Report

14 October 1945	Warta Poznań (Poland)	4–2	(Poland) Wisła Kraków	Poznań, Poland
	Gendera; Twórz; Smolarski	Report	Gracz; Kohut	Attendance: 7,000; Referee: Roman Dabert (Poznań)

21 October 1945	Wisła Kraków (Poland)	2–1	(Poland) KS Cracovia	Kraków, Poland
15:00 CEST (UTC+2)	Kohut 43'; Cholewa 88'	Report	E. Różankowski 21'	Stadium: Stadion Wisły; Attendance: 12,000; Referee: Zdzisław Skowroński (Kraków)

4 November 1945	Wisła Kraków (Poland)	1–1	(Poland) Zwierzyniecki KS	Kraków, Poland
	Panek (o.g.)	Report	Wawrzusiak	Stadium: Stadion Wisły

17 November 1945	Częstochowski KS (Poland)	5–14	(Poland) Wisła Kraków	Częstochowa, Poland
14:00 CET (UTC+1)	Wójcik; Zalas; Bojanek (pen.)	Report	Gracz; Mordarski; Woźniak; Kohut	Stadium: Stadion Wisły; Attendance: 2,000

18 November 1945	Skra Częstochowa (Poland)	1–7	(Poland) Wisła Kraków	Częstochowa, Poland
11:00 CET (UTC+1)		Report		Attendance: 6,000

== Puchar Wydziału Spraw Sędziowskich KOZPN ==
8 April 1945 Round of 32	Wisła Kraków	9–0	Wawel Kraków	Kraków, Poland
16:00 CET (UTC+1)	Bandt; Cholewa; Legutko; Cisowski; Gracz; Filek	Report		Stadium: Stadion Wisły

24 April 1945 Round of 16	Wisła Kraków	6–0	Groble Kraków	Kraków, Poland
11:00 CET (UTC+1)	Wandas; Cholewa; Gracz; Giergiel	Report		Stadium: Stadion Wisły

29 April 1945 Quarterfinal	Wisła Kraków	3–0	Krowodrza Kraków	Kraków, Poland
16:15 CET (UTC+1)	Gracz; Cholewa	Report		Stadium: Stadion Wisły; Referee: Władysław Pryk (Kraków)

10 May 1945 Semifinal	Wisła Kraków	5–0 (0–3 w.o.)	KS Zakrzowianka	Kraków, Poland
11:00 CET (UTC+1)	Gracz; Cholewa	Report		Stadium: Stadion Wisły

== A Klasa - Kraków - qualifying round ==
28 July 1945 1	Wisła Kraków	0–1	KS Prądniczanka	Kraków, Poland
18:00 CEST (UTC+2)		Report		Stadium: Stadion Wisły

5 August 1945 2	Wisła Kraków	1–1	KS Bieżanowianka	Kraków, Poland
	Wcisło	Report	Mącznik	Referee: Kazimierz Seichter (Kraków)

12 August 1945 3	Pychowianka Kraków	0–14	Wisła Kraków	Kraków, Poland
		Report	Bandt; Mącznik; Trap; Kwinta	Referee: Roman Mohyła (Kraków)

25 August 1945 4	Wisła Kraków	5–1	Bloki Kraków	Kraków, Poland
17:30 CEST (UTC+2)		Report	Lenard	Stadium: Stadion Wisły

1 September 1945 5	Wisła Kraków	8–2	Związkowiec Kraków	Kraków, Poland
	Mącznik; Bandt; Cisowski; Trap	Report

16 September 1945 6	Wisła Kraków	1–2	KS Bronowianka	Kraków, Poland
		Report		Stadium: Stadion Wisły

30 September 1945 7	Wisła Kraków	3–1	Pocztowy KS Kraków	Kraków, Poland
11:00 CEST (UTC+2)	Woźniak ? (o.g.)	Report	Markocki	Stadium: Stadion Wisły

28 October 1945 8	Wisła Kraków	10–0	Korona Kraków	Kraków, Poland
11:00 CEST (UTC+2)	Gracz; Kohut; Cholewa; Jurowicz (pen.)	Report		Stadium: Stadion Wisły
