= 1941 Wisła Kraków season =

Wisła Kraków
1941 season
- Chairman: Tadeusz Orzelski
- Okupacyjne Mistrzostwa Krakowa: 1st

The 1941 season was Wisła Kraków's 33rd year as a club.

== Friendlies ==
20 April 1941	Wisła Kraków (Poland)	6–1	(Poland) Bloki Kraków	Kraków, Poland
		Report	Czajka

1 June 1941	Wisła Kraków (Poland)	4–1	(Poland) Zwierzyniecki KS	Kraków, Poland
		Report

2 June 1941	KS Cracovia (Poland)	1–1	(Poland) Wisła Kraków	Kraków, Poland
	Młynarek	Report	Giergiel 87' (pen.)	Stadium: Stadion Juvenii; Referee: Edward Bill (Kraków)

20 September 1941	Wisła Kraków (Poland)	1–3	(Poland) AKS Kraków	Kraków, Poland
14:30 CET (UTC+1)	Gracz	Report	Cholewa; Łyko; Roczniak	Stadium: Stadion Juvenii

21 September 1941	Zwierzyniecki KS (Poland)	0–7	(Poland) Wisła Kraków	Kraków, Poland
16:30 CET (UTC+1)		Report	Gracz; Obtułowicz; Woźniak; Giergiel	Stadium: Stadion Juvenii

== Okupacyjne Mistrzostwa Krakowa ==
15 June 1941 1	Wisła Kraków	1–1	AKS Kraków	Kraków
18:00 CET (UTC+1)		Report		Stadium: Stadion Juvenii; Referee: Edward Bill (Kraków)

28 June 1941 2	Wisła Kraków	7–1	Bloki Kraków	Kraków
19:00 CET (UTC+1)		Report	Czajka	Stadium: Stadion Juvenii; Referee: Stanisław Jakubiec (Kraków)

6 July 1941 3	Wisła Kraków	6–1	Groble Kraków	Kraków
16:00 CET (UTC+1)		Report		Stadium: Stadion Juvenii; Referee: Tadeusz Kerc (Kraków)

27 July 1941 4	Wisła Kraków	6–0	Sparta Kraków	Kraków
18:00 CET (UTC+1)		Report		Stadium: Stadion Juvenii; Referee: Tadeusz Kerc (Kraków)

3 August 1941 4	Wawel Kraków	1–9	Wisła Kraków	Kraków
18:00 CET (UTC+1)		Report		Stadium: Stadion Juvenii; Referee: Stanisław Wójcik (Kraków)

9 August 1941 5	Wisła Kraków	3–0	KS Prądniczanka	Kraków
17:30 CET (UTC+1)		Report		Stadium: Stadion Juvenii

17 August 1941 6	Wisła Kraków	4–0	Garbarnia Kraków	Kraków
15:00 CET (UTC+1)		Report		Stadium: Stadion Juvenii

24 August 1941 7	Wisła Kraków	8–0	Juvenia Kraków	Kraków
17:00 CET (UTC+1)		Report		Stadium: Stadion Juvenii

30 August 1941 8	KS Cracovia	1–1	Wisła Kraków	Kraków
	Młynarek	Report	Giergiel	Stadium: Stadion Juvenii; Referee: Aleksander Wodka (Kraków)

14 September 1941 9	Dębnicki KS	0–3	Wisła Kraków	Kraków
		Report		Stadium: Stadion Juvenii

10 October 1941 10	Wisła Kraków	4–0	Zwierzyniecki KS	Kraków
		Report		Stadium: Stadion Juvenii; Referee: Józef Mytnik (Kraków)

12 October 1941 11	Wisła Kraków	4–2	Kazimierz Kraków	Kraków
16:00 CET (UTC+1)		Report		Stadium: Stadion Juvenii

19 October 1941 Final	Wisła Kraków	3–2	KS Cracovia	Kraków
14:30 CET (UTC+1)	Giergiel; Obtułowicz	Report	Młynarek; Korbas	Stadium: Stadion Juvenii; Attendance: 400; Referee: Józef Mytnik (Kraków)
