= 1944 Wisła Kraków season =

Wisła Kraków
1944 season
- Chairman: Tadeusz Orzelski
- Okupacyjne Mistrzostwa Krakowa: 2nd

The 1944 season was Wisła Kraków's 36th year as a club.

== Friendlies ==
15 April 1944	Bocheński KS (Poland)	0–5	(Poland) Wisła Kraków	Bochnia, Poland
		Report

April 1944	Wisła Kraków (Poland)	5–2	(Poland) Łobzowianka Łobzów	Kraków, Poland
		Report

30 April 1944	KS Cracovia (Poland)	0–4	(Poland) Wisła Kraków	Kraków, Poland
17:00 CET (UTC+1)		Report	Gracz; Obtułowicz; Legutko; Jurowicz (pen.)	Stadium: Stadion Garbarni; Referee: Tadeusz Mitusiński (Kraków)

21 May 1944	Kraków (Poland)	3–2	(Poland) Wisła Kraków	Kraków, Poland
		Report		Stadium: Stadion Rakowiczanki

28 May 1944	Wisła Kraków (Poland)	4–0	(Poland) Warszawskie Tow. Czarnych	Kraków, Poland
	Gracz; Giergiel; Mordarski	Report		Stadium: Stadion Garbarni; Attendance: 15,000

24 June 1944	Groble Kraków (Poland)	0–0	(Poland) Wisła Kraków	Kraków, Poland
		Report		Stadium: Stadion Borka; Referee: Aleksander Wodka (Kraków)

25 June 1944	Garbarnia Kraków (Poland)	1–3	(Poland) Wisła Kraków	Kraków, Poland
	Solek	Report	Gracz; Mordarski	Stadium: Stadion Borka

25 June 1944	Groble Kraków (Poland)	?–?	(Poland) Wisła Kraków	Kraków, Poland
		Report		Stadium: Stadion Garbarni
Note: Unknown result

12 November 1944	Groble Kraków (Poland)	3–3	(Poland) Wisła Kraków	Kraków, Poland
		Report		Stadium: Stadion Olszy

17 December 1944	Groble Kraków (Poland)	1–12	(Poland) Wisła Kraków	Kraków, Poland
		Report		Stadium: Stadion Olszy

== Okupacyjne Mistrzostwa Krakowa ==
28 May 1944 1	Rakowiczanka Kraków	2–6	Wisła Kraków	Kraków, Poland
		Report

4 June 1944 2	Wisła Kraków	10–0	Volania Kraków	Kraków, Poland
15:00 CET (UTC+1)		Report		Stadium: Boisko Rakowiczanki

11 June 1944 3	KS Nadwiślan	2–3	Wisła Kraków	Kraków, Poland
14:00 CET (UTC+1)		Report		Stadium: Boisko Garbarni

18 June 1944 4	Wisła Kraków	0–0	KS Borek	Kraków, Poland
11:00 CET (UTC+1)		Report		Stadium: Boisko Garbarni

2 July 1944 5	Wisła Kraków	0–0	Olsza Kraków	Kraków, Poland
14:00 CET (UTC+1)		Report		Stadium: Boisko Garbarni

16 July 1944 6	Wisła Kraków	3–0	KS Cracovia	Kraków, Poland
16:00 CET (UTC+1)	Mordarski; Giergiel	Report		Stadium: Boisko Garbarni; Referee: Aleksander Zdybalski (Kraków)

23 July 1944 7	Wisła Kraków	0–0	Garbarnia Kraków	Kraków, Poland
15:00 CET (UTC+1)		Report		Stadium: Boisko Rakowiczanki

30 July 1944 8	Łagiewianka Kraków	?–?	Wisła Kraków	Kraków, Poland
15:00 CET (UTC+1)		Report		Stadium: Boisko Łagiewianki
Note: Unknown result

22 October 1944 9	Wieczysta Kraków	0–4	Wisła Kraków	Kraków, Poland
		Report
