= 1940 Wisła Kraków season =

Wisła Kraków
1940 season
- Chairman: Tadeusz Orzelski
- Okupacyjne Mistrzostwa Krakowa: 1st
- Turniej Błyskawiczny: 1st

The 1940 season was Wisła Kraków's 32nd year as a club.

== Friendlies ==
5 May 1940	KS Cracovia (Poland)	0–3	(Poland) Wisła Kraków	Kraków, Poland
		Report	Obtułowicz; Woźniak; Giergiel	Stadium: Stadion Juvenii; Referee: Aleksander Wodka (Kraków)

20 July 1940	Bloki Kraków (Poland)	2–3	(Poland) Wisła Kraków	Kraków, Poland
	Czajka; Luchter	Report

15 September 1940	Nadwiślanka Nowe Brzesko (Poland)	1–5	(Poland) Wisła Kraków	Nowe Brzesko, Poland
		Report

== Okupacyjne Mistrzostwa Krakowa ==
7 August 1940 1	Wisła Kraków	10–0	Bloki Kraków	Kraków
		Report		Stadium: Stadion Juvenii; Referee: Aleksander Wodka (Kraków)

10 August 1940 2	Wisła Kraków	5–0	Zwierzyniecki KS	Kraków
		Report		Stadium: Stadion Juvenii; Referee: Zygmunt Chruściński (Kraków)

17 August 1940 3	Wisła Kraków	8–2	Garbarnia Kraków	Kraków
		Report		Stadium: Stadion Juvenii; Referee: Władysław Michalik (Kraków)

19 August 1940 4	Wisła Kraków	8–4	Groble Kraków	Kraków
		Report		Stadium: Stadion Juvenii; Referee: Edward Majcher (Kraków)

28 August 1940 5	Wisła Kraków	6–1	Sparta Kraków	Kraków
		Report		Stadium: Stadion Juvenii; Referee: Zygmunt Chruściński (Kraków)

4 September 1940 6	Juvenia Kraków	0–8	Wisła Kraków	Kraków
		Report		Stadium: Stadion Juvenii; Referee: Edward Majcher (Kraków)

15 September 1940 7	Wisła Kraków	7–1	KS Cracovia	Kraków
	Giergiel; Obtułowicz	Report	Młynarek	Stadium: Stadion Juvenii; Referee: Aleksander Wodka (Kraków)

== Turniej Błyskawiczny ==
- All matches were played 2x15 minutes.

Autumn 1940 1	Wisła Kraków	0–1	AKS Kraków	Kraków
		Report		Stadium: Stadion Juvenii

Autumn 1940 2	Wisła Kraków	3–0	KS Cracovia II	Kraków
		Report		Stadium: Stadion Juvenii

Autumn 1940 3	Wisła Kraków	7–0	Dębnicki KS	Kraków
		Report		Stadium: Stadion Juvenii

Autumn 1940 4	Wisła Kraków	2–0	Groble Kraków	Kraków
		Report		Stadium: Stadion Juvenii

Autumn 1940 5	Juvenia Kraków	0–2	Wisła Kraków	Kraków
		Report		Stadium: Stadion Juvenii

Autumn 1940 6	Wisła Kraków	4–0	Legja Kraków	Kraków
		Report		Stadium: Stadion Juvenii

Autumn 1940 7	Wisła Kraków	7–0	KS Prądniczanka	Kraków
		Report		Stadium: Stadion Juvenii

Autumn 1940 8	Wisła Kraków	2–0	Sparta Kraków	Kraków
		Report		Stadium: Stadion Juvenii

Autumn 1940 9	Wisła Kraków	3–0	Wawel Kraków	Kraków
		Report		Stadium: Stadion Juvenii

Autumn 1940 10	Wisła Kraków	2–0	Wisła II Kraków	Kraków
		Report		Stadium: Stadion Juvenii

Autumn 1940 11	Wisła Kraków	0–0	Zwierzyniecki KS	Kraków
		Report		Stadium: Stadion Juvenii

Autumn 1940 12	Wisła Kraków	1–0	Wodociągi Kraków	Kraków
		Report		Stadium: Stadion Juvenii

Autumn 1940 13	Wisła Kraków	5–1	Bloki Kraków	Kraków
		Report	Ostrowski	Stadium: Stadion Juvenii

Autumn 1940 14	Wisła Kraków	0–2	KS Cracovia	Kraków
		Report	Madryga; Młynarek	Stadium: Stadion Juvenii
