= 1943 Wisła Kraków season =

Wisła Kraków
1943 season
- Chairman: Tadeusz Orzelski
- Okupacyjne Mistrzostwa Krakowa: 2nd

The 1943 season was Wisła Kraków's 35th year as a club.

== Friendlies ==
6 June 1943	Podhale Nowy Targ (Poland)	1–1	(Poland) Wisła Kraków	Nowy Targ, Poland
		Report

14 June 1943	Garbarnia Kraków (Poland)	0–2	(Poland) Wisła Kraków	Kraków, Poland
		Report	Woźniak; Gracz	Stadium: Boisko w Bronowicach

27 June 1943	Podhale Nowy Targ (Poland)	2–8	(Poland) Wisła Kraków	Nowy Targ, Poland
		Report

1 August 1943	Łagiewianka Kraków (Poland)	2–2	(Poland) Wisła Kraków	Kraków, Poland
		Report		Stadium: Boisko w Łagiewnikach; Referee: Kazimierz Kielar (Kraków)

11 September 1943	Łagiewianka Kraków (Poland)	0–3	(Poland) Wisła Kraków	Kraków, Poland
		Report		Stadium: Boisko w Łagiewnikach

12 September 1943	KS Cracovia (Poland)	1–3	(Poland) Wisła Kraków	Kraków, Poland
		Report		Stadium: Boisko w Łagiewnikach; Referee: Władysław Michalik (Kraków)

19 September 1943	Wisła Kraków (Poland)	2–2	(Poland) Garbarnia Kraków	Kraków, Poland
17:00 CET (UTC+1)		Report		Stadium: Stadion Garbarni; Referee: Tadeusz Mitusiński (Kraków)

25 September 1943	Wisła Kraków (Poland)	2–0	(Poland) Dąbski KS	Kraków, Poland
16:30 CET (UTC+1)		Report		Stadium: Stadion Garbarni; Referee: Władysław Michalik (Kraków)

10 October 1943	Groble Kraków (Poland)	0–5	(Poland) Wisła Kraków	Kraków, Poland
17:00 CET (UTC+1)		Report		Stadium: Stadion Garbarni; Referee: Edward Bill (Kraków)

24 October 1943	KS Limanovia (Poland)	3–2	(Poland) Wisła Kraków	Limanowa, Poland
		Report

== Okupacyjne Mistrzostwa Krakowa ==
18 July 1943 1	Wisła Kraków (Poland)	4–1	(Poland) KS Nadwiślan	Kraków, Poland
18:00 CET (UTC+1)		Report		Stadium: Boisko w Borku; Referee: Edward Bill (Kraków)

25 July 1943 2	KS Borek (Poland)	0–8	(Poland) Wisła Kraków	Kraków, Poland
16:00 CET (UTC+1)		Report		Stadium: Boisko w Borku; Referee: Władysław Michalik (Kraków)

8 August 1943 3	Wisła Kraków (Poland)	3–2	(Poland) Zwierzyniecki KS	Kraków, Poland
17:00 CET (UTC+1)		Report		Stadium: Boisko w Łagiewnikach; Referee: Edward Bill (Kraków)

22 August 1943 4	Groble Kraków (Poland)	4–2	(Poland) Wisła Kraków	Kraków, Poland
		Report		Stadium: Boisko w Łagiewnikach; Referee: Władysław Michalik (Kraków)

29 August 1943 5	Wisła Kraków (Poland)	13–0	(Poland) Podgórze Kraków	Kraków, Poland
		Report		Stadium: Boisko Garbarnii; Referee: Władysław Michalik (Kraków)

5 September 1943 6	Wisła Kraków (Poland)	9–0	(Poland) Grafika Kraków	Kraków, Poland
		Report		Stadium: Boisko Garbarnii; Referee: Tadeusz Mitusiński (Kraków)

2 October 1943 7	Wisła Kraków (Poland)	6–1	(Poland) KS Krakowianka	Kraków, Poland
16:30 CET (UTC+1)		Report		Stadium: Boisko Garbarnii; Referee: Aleksander Wodka (Kraków)

17 October 1943 Final	KS Cracovia (Poland)	0–0 (3–0 w.o.)	(Poland) Wisła Kraków	Kraków, Poland
15:00 CET (UTC+1)		Report		Stadium: Boisko Garbarnii; Attendance: 10,000; Referee: Tadeusz Mitusiński (Kraków)
