= 1942 Wisła Kraków season =

Wisła Kraków
1942 season
- Chairman: Tadeusz Orzelski

The 1942 Wisła Kraków season was the 21st season of Polish football club Wisła Kraków.

Only two matches were played due to World War II.

== Friendlies ==
14 June 1942	Wisła Kraków (Poland)	2–0	(Poland) Garbarnia Kraków	Kraków, Poland
	Gracz; Woźniak	Report		Stadium: Boisko w Bronowicach Małych; Attendance: 1,500

21 June 1942	Wisła Kraków (Poland)	5–5	(Poland) Bloki Kraków	Kraków, Poland
		Report		Stadium: Boisko w Bronowicach Małych
