= Kais Al-Ani =

Iraqi footballer (born 1997)

Personal information
- Full name: Kais Al-Ani
- Date of birth: 29 March 1997 (age 29)
- Place of birth: Nowy Targ, Poland
- Height: 1.96 m (6 ft 5 in)
- Position: Goalkeeper

Team information
- Current team: Radziszowianka Radziszów
- Number: 22

Youth career
- –2011: Górale Nowy Targ
- 2011–2013: Krakus Nowa Huta
- 2013–2014: Wisła Kraków

Senior career*
Years	Team	Apps	(Gls)
2014–2018	Wisła Kraków II	7	(0)
2016–2017	→ Podhale Nowy Targ (loan)	6	(0)
2017–2018	→ Lechia Tomaszów Maz. (loan)	5	(0)
2018–2019	Soła Oświęcim	2	(0)
2019–2020	Wisła Kraków II	2	(0)
2020–2021	Ślęza Wrocław	5	(0)
2021	Polonia Nysa	7	(0)
2021–2022	LKS Śledziejowice	13	(0)
2022	Stal Mielec	0	(0)
2022	LKS Śledziejowice	0	(0)
2022–2023	Garbarnia Kraków	0	(0)
2023	Orzeł Ryczów	4	(0)
2023–2025	Sparta Kazimierza Wielka	3	(0)
2025–	Radziszowianka Radziszów	9	(0)

International career
2018	Iraq U23		
- * Club domestic league appearances and goals as of 22:56, 12 January 2026 (UTC)

Kais Al-Ani (Arabic: قَيْس الْعَانِيّ; born 29 March 1997) is a footballer who plays as a goalkeeper for Polish club Radziszowianka Radziszów, where he also serves as a youth goalkeeping coach. Born in Poland, he was an Iraq youth international.

== Club career ==
Al-Ani trialed for Spanish La Liga side Málaga.

== International career ==
Al-Ani received call-ups to the Iraq national team, and was described as "expected to be an important part of the Iraq team".

== Style of play ==
Al-Ani has said he was "praised... for resuming the game with my legs and the confidence to intervene".

== Personal life ==
Al-Ani is a native of Podhale, Poland, and attended the Górale Football School. He was born to an Iraqi father and a Polish mother, and has a sister.

== Honours ==
Sparta Kazimierza Wielka

- IV liga Świętokrzyskie: 2024–25
