= Stanisław Różankowski =

Polish footballer

Stanisław Różankowski (25 January 1925 in Myślenice – 1 July 2004 in Kraków) was a football player and one of Cracovia's most renowned forwards, the 1948 Champion of Poland together with Cracovia.

As a child, he went to an elementary school in Kraków and after classes used to play football in city parks. One day Różankowski was noticed by Cracovia's scout Ignacy Książek, who invited him to the youth team of the club. During the Second World War he lived in Myślenice, to return to Kraków in 1945.

His debut in Cracovia's team took place in the Holy War (Kraków) game vs. local rival Wisła Kraków on 21 October 1945. It was excellent, as Różankowski scored his side's lone goal, with a header. He was regarded as a first-class player in the air, winning most high balls. Out of 111 goals scored for Cracovia by him, 90 percent were headers. In 1948 Różankowski, together with his team, became the Champion of Poland. Soon afterwards he was sent back to Myślenice, as he was disliked by the Communist government for loudly criticizing it.

His last game in Cracovia's jersey was on 24 June 1951. During the six years of career, Różankowski played in 126 games, with the astounding score of 0.88 goals per match. After retiring, he coached Cracovia's youth teams, also was a member of Cracovia's Council of Seniors.

Source: "http://www.wikipasy.pl/Stanis%C5%82aw_R%C3%B3%C5%BCankowski"
