= Jan Włodarczyk =

Polish footballer

Personal information
- Date of birth: 15 December 1919
- Place of birth: Łódź, Poland
- Date of death: 4 September 1998 (aged 78)
- Place of death: Łódź, Poland
- Height: 1.72 m (5 ft 8 in)
- Position: Defender

Senior career*
Years	Team	Apps	(Gls)
1932–1935	Jedność Łódź		
1935–1939	Sokół Łódź		
1940–1942	Wicher Łódź		
1945–1953	ŁKS Łódź		

International career
1947–1948	Poland	6	(0)
- * Club domestic league appearances and goals

Jan Włodarczyk (15 December 1919 – 4 September 1998) was a Polish footballer who played as a defender.

He played in six matches for the Poland national football team from 1947 to 1948.
