= Zygmunt Ochmański =

Polish footballer

Personal information
- Date of birth: 2 October 1922
- Place of birth: Warsaw, Poland
- Date of death: 10 June 2003 (aged 80)
- Place of death: Warsaw, Poland
- Height: 1.72 m (5 ft 8 in)
- Position: Midfielder

Senior career*
Years	Team	Apps	(Gls)
1937	Orkan Warsaw		
1938–1939	Skra Warsaw		
1946–1950	Polonia Warsaw		
1950	Legia Warsaw		
1951–1956	Gwardia Warsaw		

International career
1949	Poland	1	(0)
- * Club domestic league appearances and goals

Zygmunt Ochmański (2 October 1922 – 10 June 2003) was a Polish footballer who played as a midfielder.

He played in one match for the Poland national team in 1949.

== Honours ==
Polonia Warsaw

- Ekstraklasa: 1946

Gwardia Warsaw

- Polish Cup: 1953–54
