= Tadeusz Waśko =

Polish footballer

Personal information
- Date of birth: 9 December 1922
- Place of birth: Kraków, Austria-Hungary
- Date of death: 4 May 1980 (aged 57)
- Place of death: Otwock, Poland
- Height: 1.68 m (5 ft 6 in)
- Position: Midfielder

Senior career*
Years	Team	Apps	(Gls)
1937–1939	Wisła Kraków		
1945	Orzeł Częstochowa		
1945–1949	Legia Warsaw		
1950–1951	Gwardia Warsaw		

International career
1948	Poland	7	(0)
- * Club domestic league appearances and goals

Tadeusz Waśko (9 December 1922 – 4 May 1980) was a Polish footballer who played as a midfielder.

He made seven appearances for the Poland national team in 1948.
