= Marian Jabłoński =

Polish footballer

Personal information
- Date of birth: 4 February 1922
- Place of birth: Kraków, Poland
- Date of death: 11 March 2004 (aged 82)
- Place of death: Kraków, Poland
- Height: 1.74 m (5 ft 9 in)
- Position: Midfielder

Senior career*
Years	Team	Apps	(Gls)
1935–1939	Nadwiślan Kraków		
1962–1963	Krakowianka Kraków		
1945–1950	Cracovia		

International career
1947–1949	Poland	3	(0)

Managerial career
- 1954: Cracovia
- 1960–1962: Hutnik Kraków
- 1964–1968: Hutnik Kraków
- 1970: Cracovia
- 1972: Stal Rzeszów
- 1985: Cracovia
- 1992: Cracovia
- * Club domestic league appearances and goals

Marian Jabłoński (4 February 1922 – 11 March 2004) was a Polish footballer who played as a midfielder.

He made three appearances for the Poland national team from 1947 to 1949.

== Honours ==
Cracovia

- Ekstraklasa: 1948
