= Henryk Bobula =

Polish footballer (1920–1998)

Personal information
- Date of birth: 4 March 1920
- Place of birth: Omsk, Russia
- Date of death: 4 May 1998 (aged 78)
- Place of death: Kraków, Poland
- Height: 1.76 m (5 ft 9 in)
- Position: Forward

Senior career*
Years	Team	Apps	(Gls)
1934–1939	Olsza Kraków		
1940–1945	AKS Kraków		
1940–1952	Cracovia		
1952–1957	Prokocim Kraków		
1952–1957	Sparta Kazimierza Wielka		

International career
1948	Poland	5	(0)

Managerial career
- Raków Częstochowa
- Stal Stalowa Wola
- * Club domestic league appearances and goals

Henryk Bobula (4 March 1920 – 4 May 1998) was a Polish footballer who played as a forward.

He earned five caps for the Poland national team in 1948.

== Honours ==
Cracovia

- Ekstraklasa: 1948
