= Franciszek Pytel =

Polish footballer

Personal information
- Date of birth: 24 June 1918
- Place of birth: Chorzów, Poland
- Date of death: 31 December 1988 (aged 70)
- Place of death: Starachowice, Poland
- Position: Forward

Youth career
- 1932–1937: AKS Chorzów

Senior career*
Years	Team	Apps	(Gls)
1937–1939	AKS Chorzów		
1940–1943	Germania Königshütte		
1946–1949	AKS Chorzów		

International career
1937	Poland	1	(1)

Managerial career
- Unia Kędzierzyn Koźle
- Motor Lublin
- Star Starachowice
- * Club domestic league appearances and goals

Franciszek Pytel (24 June 1918 – 31 December 1988) was a Polish footballer who played as a forward. He made one appearance for the Poland national team in 1937.

== Honours ==
AKS Chorzów/Germania Königshütte

- Autonomous Silesian Voivodeship Championship: 1936
- Gauliga Schlesien: 1942, 1943, 1944
