= Stanisław Kaźmierczak (footballer) =

Polish footballer

Personal information
- Full name: Stanisław Walenty Kaźmierczak
- Date of birth: 9 December 1914
- Place of birth: Röllinghausen, Germany
- Date of death: 2 January 2003 (aged 88)
- Place of death: Poznań, Poland
- Height: 1.78 m (5 ft 10 in)
- Positions: Forward; midfielder

Senior career*
Years	Team	Apps	(Gls)
1928–1936	Korona Poznań		
1936–1939	Warta Poznań		
1945–1949	Warta Poznań		

International career
1947	Poland	1	(0)

Managerial career
- Dąb-Budowlani Poznań
- Victoria Jaworzno
- Sparta Mosina
- 1957–1960: Warta Poznań
- Olimpia Poznań
- Greater Poland FA
- KS Posnania (youth)
- * Club domestic league appearances and goals

Stanisław Walenty Kaźmierczak (9 December 1914 – 2 January 2003) was a Polish football manager, player and a soldier during World War II. He earned one cap for the Poland national team in 1947, and holds the record for the oldest-ever player to make his debut for Poland, at the age of 32 years and 184 days.

== Honours ==
Warta Poznań

- Ekstraklasa: 1947
