= Henryk Jaźnicki =

Polish footballer (1917–2004)

Personal information
- Full name: Henryk Jaźnicki
- Date of birth: 6 September 1917
- Place of birth: Radzyń Podlaski, Congress Poland
- Date of death: 25 February 2004 (aged 86)
- Place of death: Józefów, Poland
- Height: 1.72 m (5 ft 7 1/2 in)
- Position: Forward

Senior career*
Years	Team	Apps	(Gls)
1938–1939	Polonia Warsaw	26	(12)
1945	Polonia Warsaw		
1945–1946	Społem Warsaw		
1947–1952	Polonia Warsaw		

International career
1939	Poland	1	(0)
- * Club domestic league appearances and goals

Henryk Jaźnicki (6 September 1917 – 25 February 2004) was a Polish footballer who played as a forward. Representing Polonia Warsaw, he also played for their basketball, volleyball and handball teams.

Jaźnicki made his sole appearance for the Poland national football team on 27 August 1939 in Warsaw, in a 4–2 win over Hungary, and was replaced in the 31st minute by Stanisław Baran.

After the Second World War, Jaźnicki returned to Polonia, where he continued his career until 1952. He not only excelled in football - he also played volleyball (winning three national titles), basketball (national title in 1947) and handball (runners-up in 1947). During the war, he fought in the Polish September Campaign, was caught by the Germans, was a prisoner of notorious Pawiak prison in Warsaw, before being shuttled to Sachsenhausen and Mauthausen camps.

== See also ==
- The last game: 27 August 1939. Poland - Hungary 4-2
