= Michał Filek =

Polish footballer

Personal information
- Date of birth: 25 August 1916
- Place of birth: Nowe Dwory, Austria-Hungary
- Date of death: 6 August 2003 (aged 86)
- Place of death: Kraków, Poland
- Height: 1.75 m (5 ft 9 in)
- Position: Midfielder

Senior career*
Years	Team	Apps	(Gls)
1933–1934	Legion Płaszów		
1935–1949	Wisła Kraków		
1950	Garbarnia Kraków		

International career
1947	Poland	1	(0)
- * Club domestic league appearances and goals

Michał Filek (25 August 1916 – 6 August 2003) was a Polish footballer who played as a midfielder.

He made one official appearance for the Poland national team, in a 1–3 loss to Norway on 11 June 1947.
