= Bolesław Gendera =

Polish footballer

Personal information
- Full name: Czesław Bolesław Gendera
- Date of birth: 14 May 1918
- Place of birth: Poznań, Poland
- Date of death: 18 November 1997 (aged 79)
- Place of death: Poznań, Poland
- Height: 1.69 m (5 ft 7 in)
- Position: Forward

Youth career
- –1932: Sława Poznań
- 1932–1935: Warta Poznań

Senior career*
Years	Team	Apps	(Gls)
1935–1939	Warta Poznań		
1946–1952	Warta Poznań		

International career
1938	Poland	1	(0)

Managerial career
- Polonia Poznań
- Energetyk Poznań
- * Club domestic league appearances and goals

Czesław Bolesław Gendera (14 May 1918 – 18 November 1997) was a Polish footballer who played as a forward. He played in one match for the Poland national football team in 1938.

== Honours ==
Warta Poznań

- Ekstraklasa: 1947
