= Henryk Reyman Municipal Stadium =

Football stadium in Kraków, Poland

Coordinates: 50°3′49″N 19°54′43″E

Synerise Arena - Henryk Reyman Municipal Stadium
- Synerise Arena Kraków, R22
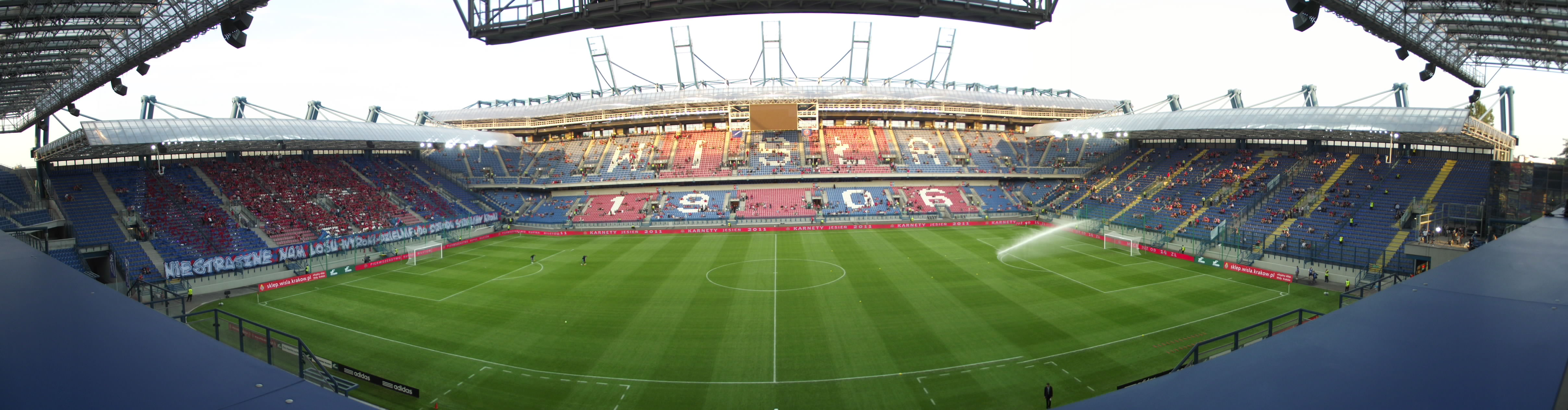
- UEFA Category 4 Stadium
- Interactive map of Synerise Arena - Henryk Reyman Municipal Stadium
- Location: 22 Władysław Reymont Street, 30-059 Kraków, Poland
- Owner: City of Kraków
- Operator: Wisła Kraków
- Capacity: 33,326
- Surface: Grass
- Record attendance: 45,000 (Wisła Kraków – Celtic)
- Field size: 105 m × 72 m (344 ft × 236 ft)

Construction
- Opened: May 1953
- Renovated: 2004–2011
- Cost: 445 million PLN
- Architect: Wojciech Obtułowicz

Tenants
- Wisła Kraków (1953–present); Garbarnia Kraków (2018–2019); Shakhtar Donetsk (2025–2026, European games); Wieczysta Kraków (2026–present)

Stadion Miejski im. Henryka Reymana (English: Henryk Reyman Municipal Stadium), known for sponsorship reasons as Synerise Arena - Stadion Miejski im. Henryka Reymana or Synerise Arena Kraków for short, is a football-specific stadium in Kraków, Poland.

It is the home ground of Wisła Kraków. The stadium has a capacity of 33,326 spectators, all seated, and is fully roofed. The stadium was originally built in 1953. From 2003 to 2011, the stadium was completely reconstructed with four new stands and a media pavilion. Reconstruction was finally completed in October 2011.

Thanks to resolution passed by Kraków City council on 23 January 2008, the stadium is named after Wisła's legendary player Henryk Tomasz Reyman.

Municipal Stadium in Kraków meets the criteria for UEFA Category 4.

== History ==
=== Previous grounds of Wisła Kraków ===
The current stadium is the third home of the Wisła Kraków. The first stadium was located about 500m away from the current location in the Oleandry area. It was built in 1914 and inaugurated on 16 April same year, with a 3–2 win over Czarni Lwów, but only one year later it burned down. That stadium was never finished and World War I left only rubble of the ground. In 1922 Wisła moved to a new stadium in the same area. This one survived World War II, but couldn't cope with the post-war popularity of football. Moreover, in 1946 Kraków was afflicted by a huge storm and stadium has been seriously damaged.

=== Current stadium location ===
In May 1953 the new stadium – third one in Wisła history – was opened next to the old stadium. This is a place where Wisła Kraków plays their home matches today. Stadium featured an oval running track surrounding football field. A characteristic feature of this building was called 'Brandenburg Gates' located on the stands behind the goals.

=== The '70s & '80s ===
Floodlights masts was installed on the stadium in 1972. Their officially inauguration took place on 11 June 1972 during league match between Wisla Kraków and Legia Warsaw, which ended in a draw 1:1. In 1976 Wisła Kraków was playing Celtic Glasgow in UEFA Cup. After the team having drawn the first game away 2:2, crowds were flocking to see Wisła fight with the Bhoys on 29 September. The media and fans present at the game say of approximately 45 000 spectators, however the precise number is unknown. This game (won 2:0) holds the stadium's record of attendance. In 1985 plans to build new main stand was announced. Therefore, sectors I, II, III, IV and V (whole main stand) had been demolished. However, lack of funds for continuation of construction resulted in situation in which stadium remained without a main stand for more than 10 next years.

=== The '90s & '00s ===
Renovation of south stand and floodlights masts dismantling took place in 1995 year. Construction of the new main stand started in 1996. It was financed by the joint office of the City of Kraków and Totalizator Sportowy. Opening of the new grandstand (sectors A and B, as well as VIP sector) took place in March 1998 during the league match between Wisła and GKS Katowice. In 1998, the east stand underwent yet another renovation. Around 4800 plastic seats were installed. Also, oval running track surrounding football pitch was completely removed.

Artificial hills behind the goals was demolished in January 1999. In July 2000, on the side of 3 Maja street, temporary south stand for the visiting team's supporters was constructed, with capacity about 250 people. Over time it has been expanded to holds 500 people. In April 2002, new floodlights masts was installed to meet requirements imposed by the Polish Football Association. In June 2003, turf heating system was installed. In June 2004 the licensing requirements imposed by the Polish Football Association forced Wisła to build temporary all-seater and fully roofed north stand. Its capacity was about 1000 people. At the same time, it was also decided to reduce the height of the fence in front of the main stand to 1 m, in order to improve comfort of watching the matches.

== 2004–2011 redevelopment (New stadium) ==
=== Overall ===
The construction project developed by architecture and design studio owned by Wojciech Obtułowicz has been changed four times with key features remaining the same. The first conception assumed the construction of the stadium for more than 20 000 seats with leaving of the main stand which was built in the mid nineties. According to this project in November 2004, the construction of a new south stand has begun with striker Maciej Żurawski digging the first shovel. It was completed in June 2006, costing nearly 35 mln zł. The main contractor was Budimex Dromex. In the meantime, in January 2006, construction of the twin northern stand has begun. Its construction lasted 12 months with both the contractor and the cost were exactly the same as in the case of the southern stand.

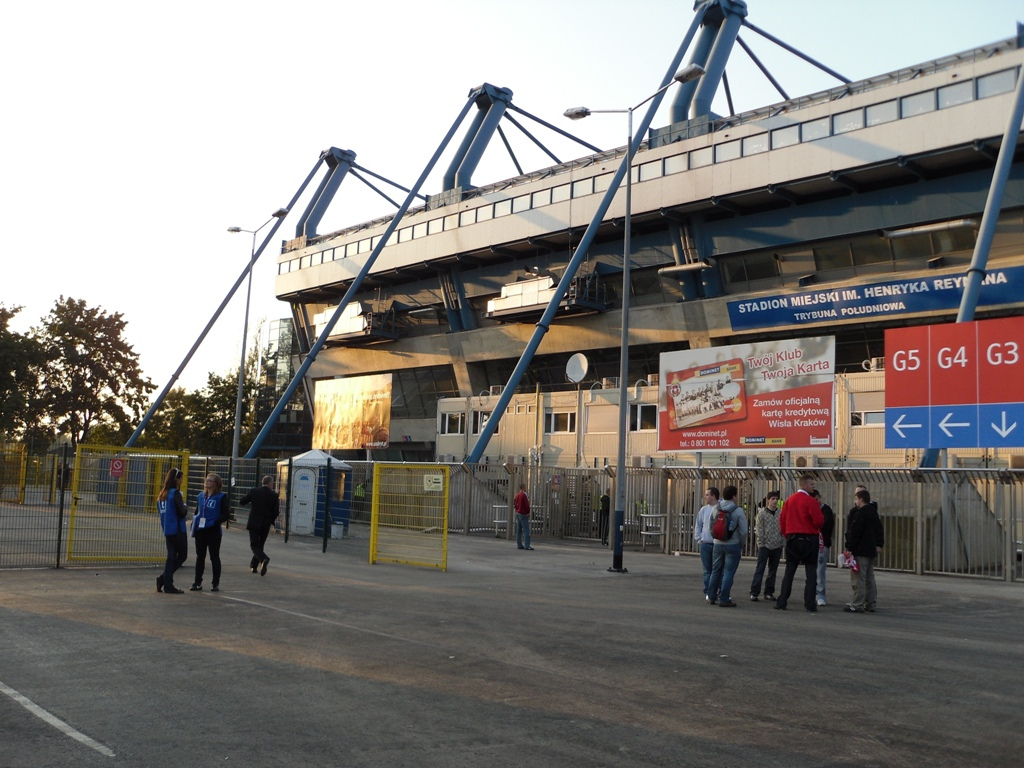
Wisła Stadium façade

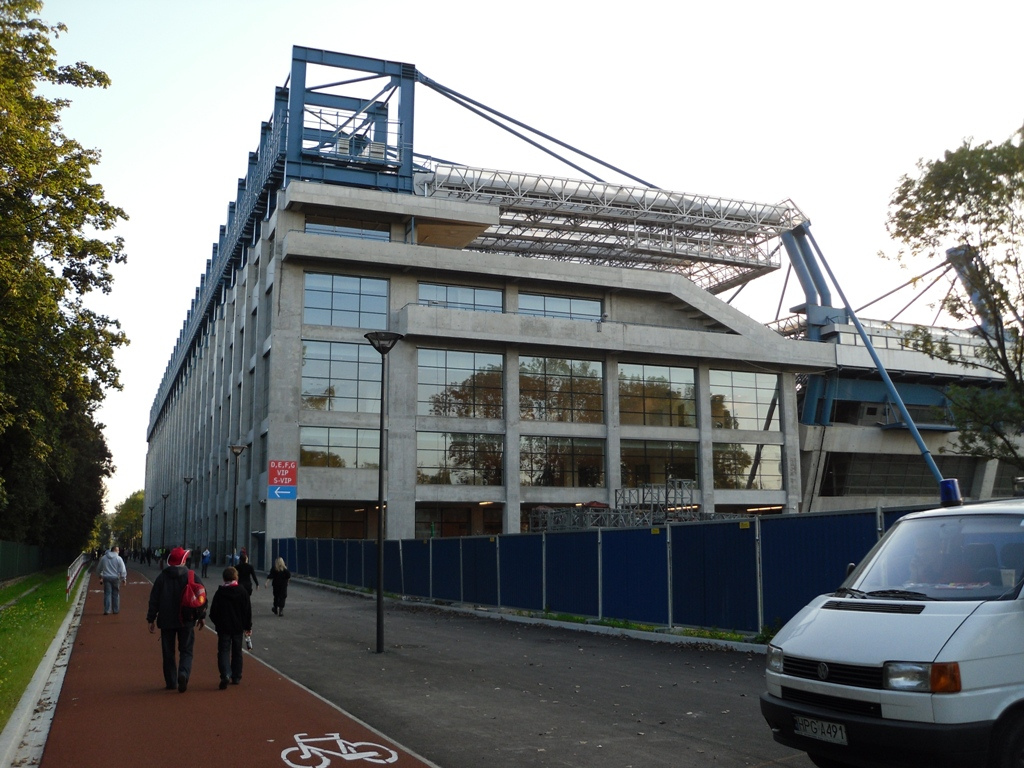
Wisła Stadium façade

In April 2007 it was announced that the UEFA European Football Championship in 2012 will be co-hosted by Poland. Kraków and Wisła Stadium, was chosen to be a reserve host for upcoming event. Therefore, the stadium project was changed to meets the requirements for elite class stadium.

In September 2007, Budimex Dromex started the construction of media pavilion – a building that was part of the previous concept of the stadium. In October the architectural studio of Wojciech Obtułowicz has been commissioned to carry out the new stadium project. It cost about 3.5 million zł. In January 2008 the construction of media pavilion was completed. The total cost of this investment exceeded 11 million zł.

The demolition of the old east stand begun in May 2008. In February 2009 Polimex-Mostostal started the construction of the new East stand, whose cost was approximately 144 million zł. After the end of 2008/09 Ekstraklasa season in June 2009, Polimex-Mostostal began demolition of the main stand (west) and the construction of the new one. The cost was over 153 million zł.

Wisła Kraków played its 2009/2010 season matches at Stadion Ludowy in Sosnowiec and Stadion Suche Stawy, due to more advanced construction works on the stadium.

In early October 2009, the contractor which built two stands Polimex-Mostostal, applied to the investor for financing the project by an additional 28.9 million zł. The grant would cover the cost of rebuilding the installations network under the stadium.

On 1 November 2009 the architectural studio of Wojciech Obtułowicz was released from its contract for construction project of the stadium. The reason for exclusion of the architect was that it could not keep up with making of amendments to its draft, which contained some incorrect data. For that reason, it was impossible to continue construction at the right pace and resulted in some major delays in work. Redesign took the lead contractor – Polimex-Mostostal.

On 4 November 2009 the Kraków city councilors voted to transfer additional funds amounted to 29.9 million zł for the stadium construction. In case donation has not been awarded then the contractor building of both stands (east and west) could stop the construction and request compensation from the city. The mayor of the City of Kraków Jacek Majchrowski presented the estimated cost of building the entire stadium, which in total amounted to 445 million zł.

Finally stadium construction ended in mid-2011. This included construction of whole Main stand and additional works made by Mostostal Warszawa SA in the interior of the north stand. First match with all four stands opened took place at 15 October 2011. The opponent was Jagiellonia Białystok and Wisla won 3–1.

== Stadium ==
=== Layout ===
The shape of the stadium is the legacy of past construction projects. Two grandstands behind the goals and the media pavilion located in the corner between the western and southern grandstand were built according to the old concept. Both two-level stands along the side lines are the result of implementation of the last fourth construction concepts

One of the most important places of the stadium will be the presidential box with an area of 250 m^{2} (2,700 sq ft). At the stadium there are 33 boxes behind glass (called skyboxes), located between the levels of the stands. Each of them have an area of about 35 m^{2} (380 sq ft)>. Each of the lodges have a separate entrance and is equipped with seats of higher standard. In addition, the stadium has 1638 seats for VIP and 477 for the super-VIP. The Wisła fan shop is located within the east stand.

Elevation of the western and eastern stands refer to the colonnade, which was built around the grandstands of the old stadium. Simple mesh lattice were used in construction, which resulted in a larger commercial area inside the stands, in comparison to the northern and southern grandstand, where the elevation is made up of diagonal strands.

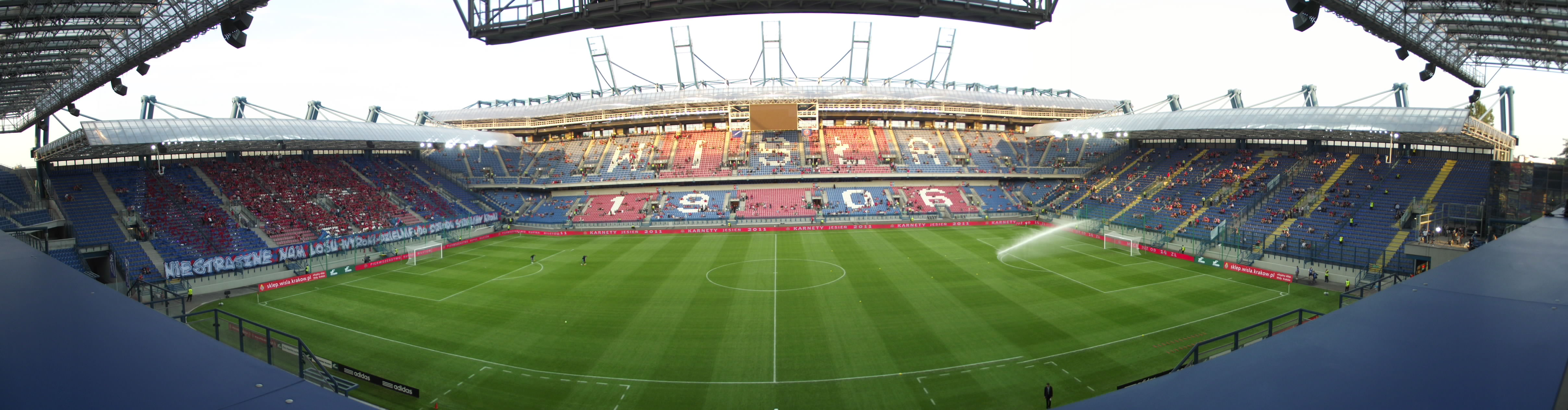
A Panorama view of the stadium

According to the chief architect of the stadium, Wojciech Obtułowicz solutions applied during construction process give stadium the atmosphere of the theater.

An important advantage of the stadium construction is the large, one-level stands behind the goals, which provide plenty of space inside both structures and greatly affect the quality of doping and the possibility of making more advanced choreos by Wisła's fans. Another advantage of the stadium project is a roof, equipped with automatic snow melting systems, and the transparency of the material from which it has been built, which has a positive effect on grass growth on the football pitch. The main disadvantage of the stadium construction is the relatively long distance between the grandstands and the football pitch.

The construction companies which built each stands have given ten years guarantee for their constructions.

=== West stand ===
West stand is the main stand on the stadium with capacity of 9181 spectators. First level can holds 3682 people and it is divided into 6 sections: A1, B11, B12, H1, VIP and VIP lodges – each of them (except VIP lodges) have 18 rows. Second level consists of 11 sections: A21 to A23, B21 to B24, H21 to H23 and press section. Construction of the west stand began in mid-August 2009 – the latest of all stands of the stadium. This two-level stand has only one corner – the north one. Media pavilion is located in the place of the south corner. There is a wave-like shaped huge roof above the main entrance to this stand. Western stand consists of six floors, the lowest is located below ground level.

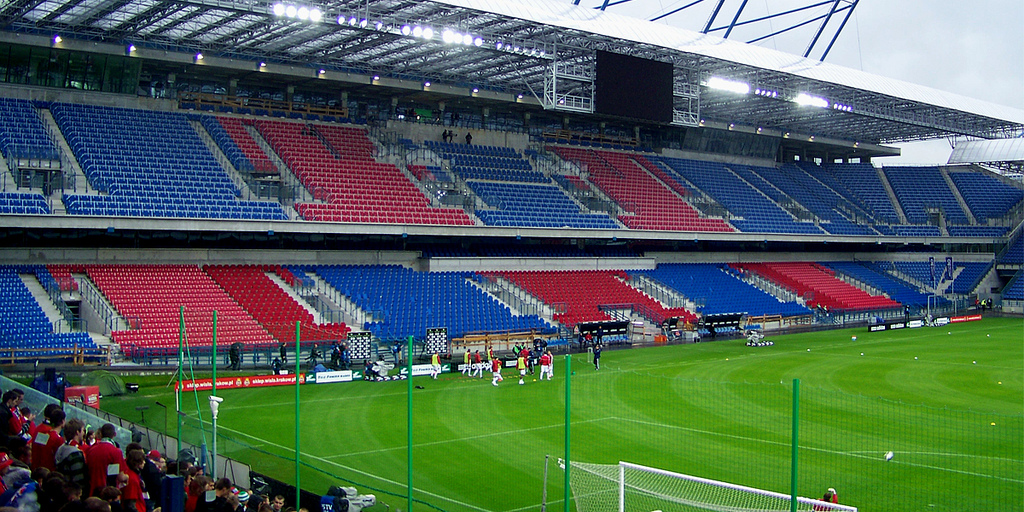
West stand

Lower level of the western stand consists of two parts, which are located at different depths. In the lower part there is underground parking for VIPs and buses of both teams. At the lowest part technical rooms, warehouses and staff rooms are located. Rooms for the referees and changing rooms for the home and away teams are also located there (booth have an area of 100 m^{2}).

Reception, information, commercial and gastronomic points are located on the ground floor. Many corridors and halls leading to the staircases, which fans can get to higher floors of the stand are also located on this level. The ground floor also includes panoramic glass elevators and a direct entry for spectators at the first level of the stands. On the first floor there is a representative hall leading to the so-called Sky-boxes, lodges for VIPs and observers. Presidential lodge, which covers an area of nearly 240 m^{2} (2,600 sq ft) and business lounge are located on this floor.

The second floor is designed for fans sitting on the second level of the west stand. The vast majority of the surface of the second floor is used for toilets and gastronomic points for spectators.

On the third floor there is a media zone, as well as toilets for the disabled persons. Furthermore, gastronomic points and catering hall are located on this floor.

Fourth floor is dedicated exclusively for the media. It contains commentators cabins, media working zones as well as television platforms and studios with a panoramic view of the pitch.

=== East stand ===
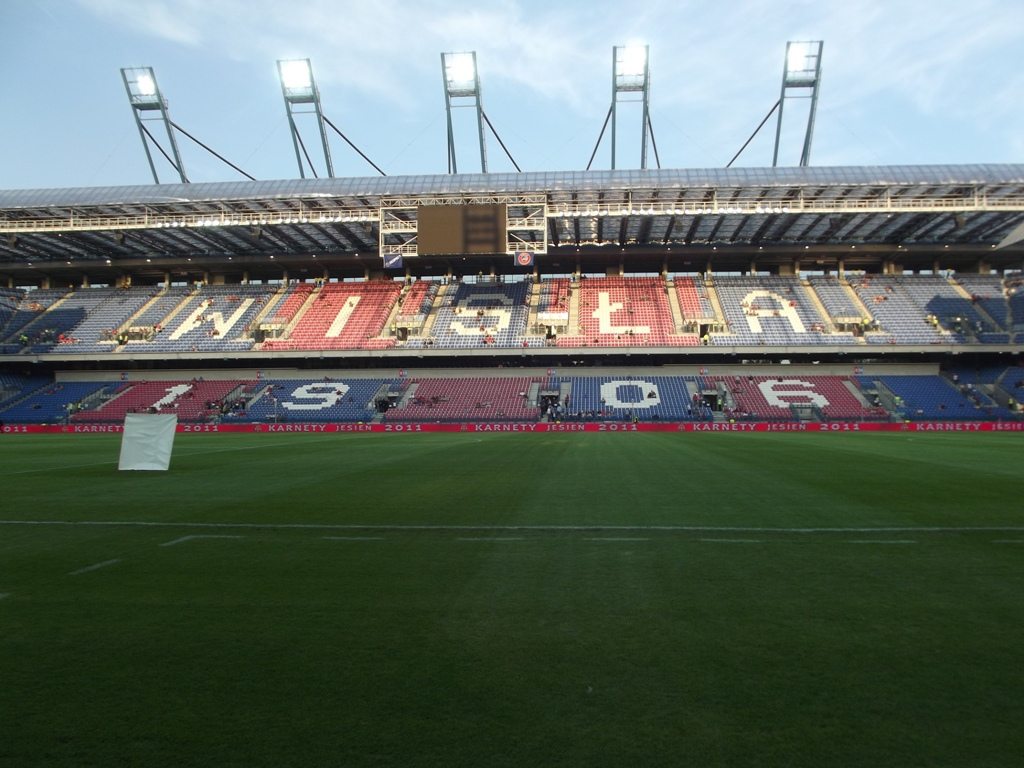
East Stand

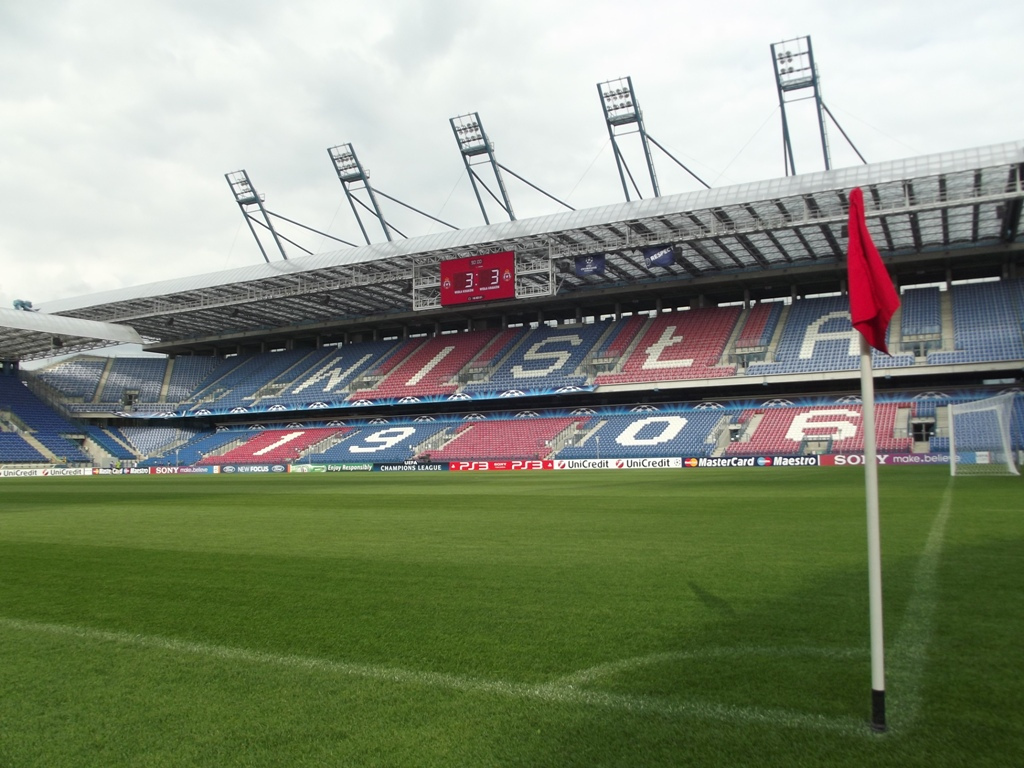
East Stand

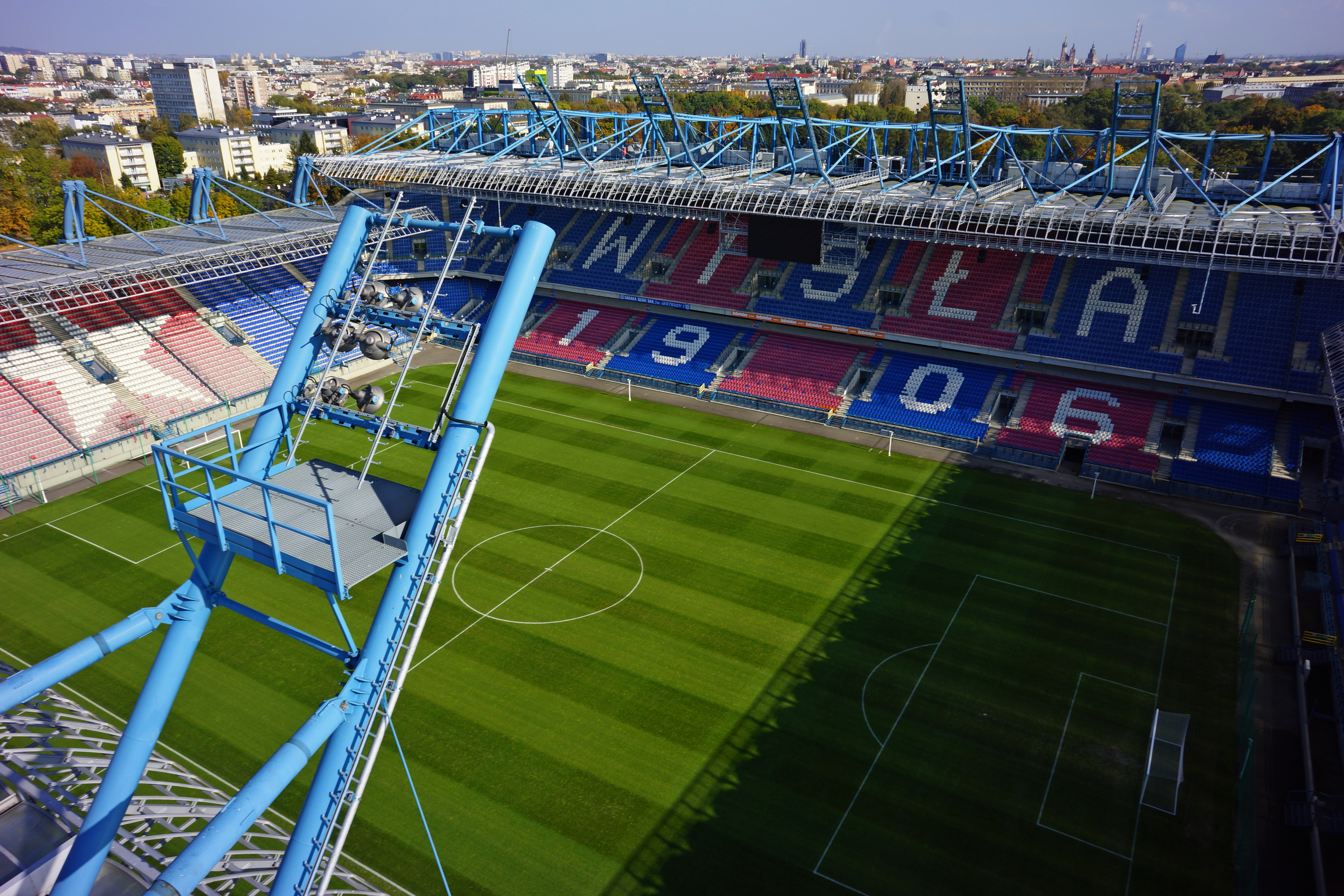
East Stand

East stand is the biggest two-level stand on the stadium with capacity of 12,831 spectators. First level is divided into 11 sections: D11, D12, E11 to E16, F11, F12 (18 rows each) and VIP lodges. Capacity is 4591. Second level can holds 8030 people and consists of 14 sections: D21 to D24, E21 to E26 and F21 to F24 (24 rows each).

Construction works on East Stand started at the beginning of 2009. In contrast to the twin west stand, this has both corners. Entrances to east stand are located on the side of Reymana street.

East stand as well as the west one has two levels and consists of six floors.

At the lower (underground) level of this stand, technical rooms and warehouses are located. One of the warehouses is being used by the club shop, located inside the stadium. The largest room on this level is designed for the technical team working on football field maintenance and.

Same like west stand, information, commercial and gastronomic points are located on the ground floor. In addition, there are also small warehouses. On the ground floor fans can get through the transparent lobby (whose area is over 2200 m ²) and then direct entrances into the first level of the east stand. On this floor there are also stairways and elevators, which fans can get to higher floors of the stand.

Most of the first floor area is occupied by VIP lounges. In addition there are also two conference rooms, offices, gastronomic points and restaurant. On the first floor in the north-east corner there will be a club museum.

The second floor is designed for fans sitting on the second level of the west stand.. Most of the area of second floor is occupied by toilets and gastronomic points for spectators.

On the third floor offices are located. In both corners there are large conference rooms, with an area of more than 450 m^{2} (4,800 sq ft).

On the fourth floor of this stand there are balconies, which are used by television stations broadcasting the matches.

=== North stand ===
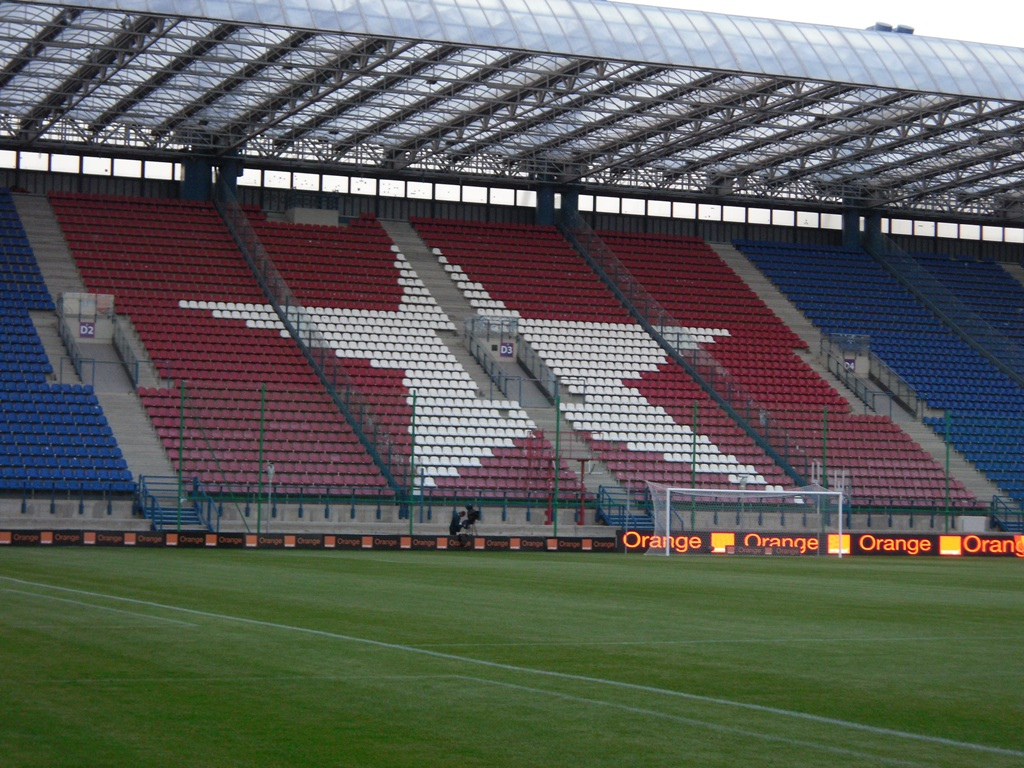
North Stand

North Stand is one-level stand located behind the goal on the side of Władysława Reymonta street. Capacity is 5642 spectators. This stand is divided into 5 section: C1 to C5 (32 rows each). Construction of the north stand started in 2006 and was completed in January 2007. This part of the stadium is very similar to the existing south stand. Construction project of north stand is a copy of its counterpart of the south stand, which started the construction of a new stadium.

The interior of the north stand remained unfinished for about four years. Additional work has been made by Mostostal Warsaw SA and was completed in mid-2011. Work included construction of staircases, entrances for spectators, electrical wiring, water pipe system and sanitary sewer.

Since early 2008, the north stand is typically occupied by fans of Wisła Kraków. The middle sections have a white star symbol created of blue, red and white seats.

=== South stand ===
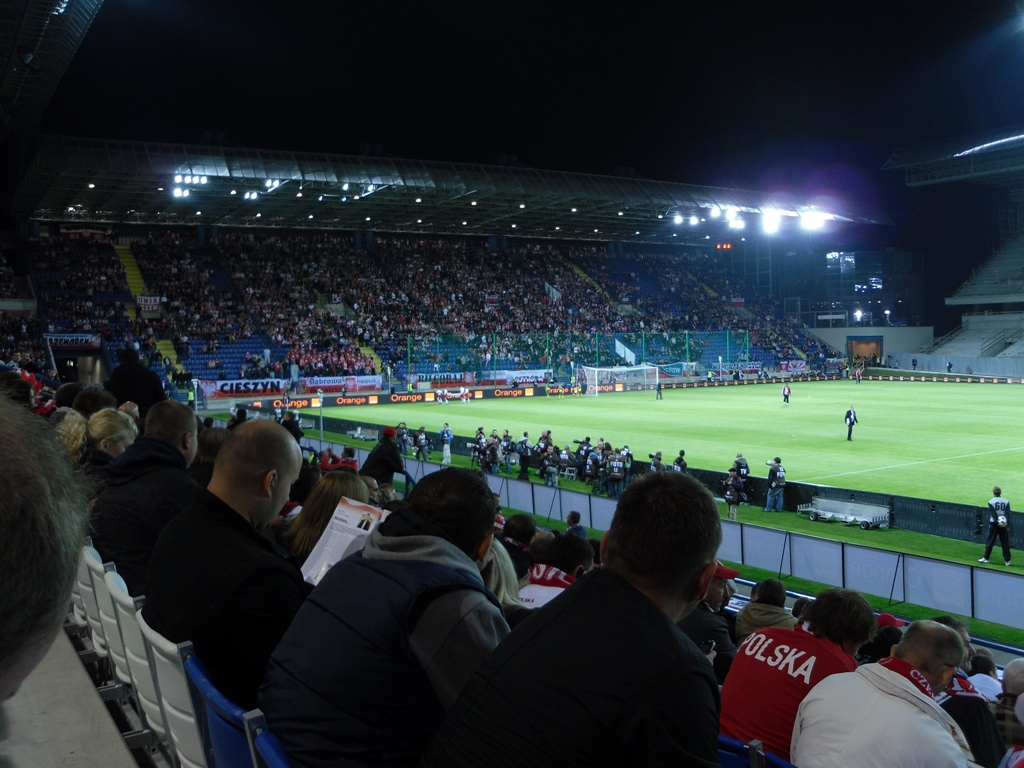
South Stand

South stand is a one-level construction with capacity of 5672 spectators. Construction on the site started in November 2004 with striker Maciej Żurawski digging the first shovel. First supporters entered the stand when it was half-finished in August 2005, for the game against Panathinaikos in Champions League qualifiers.

It is concrete and steel structure, covered with roof supported by guy-wires which are anchored into concrete blocks located before entrances to the grandstand. Whole structure is supported by front elevation diagonal, concrete pillars.

For navigating and organisational reasons the Stand was called simply "Sektor E" as A and B were placed on the Main Stand, C was the East and D was the temporary North Stand. Therefore, E was simply the next letter in the alphabet. Nowadays, the stand is signed as G and it is divided into 5 sections (from G1 to G5, 32 rows each). Stand's cost was estimated at 34mln PLN. In the end, this number was exceeded by another 3 mln PLN. Section for visitor supporters is located in the west part of this stand (near Media Pavilon and west stand). After last enlargement, visitor supporters sector is compared of G4 and G5 sections and has capacity of 2043 people. Hence G3 section became a buffer section between home and away fans.

The interior of the stands are managed. It includes toilets, lavatories, staircases, entrances for spectators and gastronomic points.

=== Media Pavilion ===
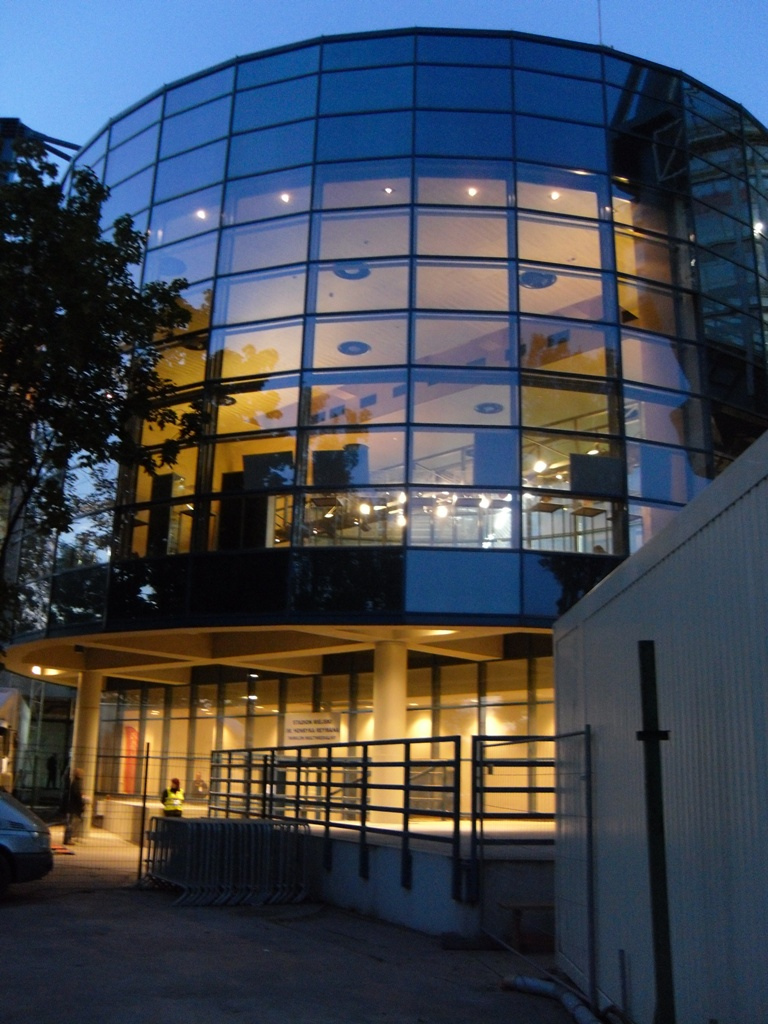
Media Pavilion

Media Pavilion is the legacy of the first three stadium projects, according to which the facilities under the stands would not be as developed as they are in the current version. The building is located in the corner, between west and south stands. The construction of the Media Pavilion started in September 2007 and was completed in January 2008. The main contractor was Budimex Dromex and cost was 11 384 mln zł. The building is 16 meters tall and 22 meters long.

On the ground floor there is so-called mixed zone with place where players can give interviews to journalists, stadium kitchen with buffet, toilets and technical rooms. On the first floor of the pavilion's main conference room is located. Capacity of this conference room is about 200 people. Media Pavilion also has a terrace extended inside the stadium. This is a place where television studio will be located during the matches.

Media Pavilion is often called Okrąglak.

== Euro 2012 ==
Kraków was a reserve city for the Euro 2012 in Poland and Ukraine. Wisła Stadium was the planned venue for the tournament. Referring to the above matter it was decided to change the project, who had previously assumed stadium capacity of approximately 21 500 seats. The revised draft has greatly increased stadium capacity to meets all the requirements for elite class stadium.

On 13 May 2009, UEFA Executive Committee decided to confirm the appointment of the four venues initially proposed by the Polish Football Association during the bidding phase and signed by UEFA as official host cities which were Gdańsk, Poznań, Warsaw and Wroclaw. Thus, Kraków was not appointed as official host city nor retained as reserve city.

== See also ==
- Błonia Park
- Józef Piłsudski Cracovia Stadium
- A4 motorway
- List of football stadiums in Poland
