= Jerzy Jurowicz =

Polish footballer

Personal information
- Date of birth: 21 May 1920
- Place of birth: Kraków, Poland
- Date of death: 19 October 1989 (aged 69)
- Place of death: Kraków, Poland
- Height: 1.76 m (5 ft 9 in)
- Position: Goalkeeper

Youth career
- 1933–1937: Wisła Kraków

Senior career*
Years	Team	Apps	(Gls)
1937–1955	Wisła Kraków	168	(0)

International career
1947–1950	Poland	8	(0)
- * Club domestic league appearances and goals

Jerzy Jurowicz (21 May 1920 – 19 October 1989) was a Polish footballer who played as a goalkeeper. He played in eight matches for the Poland national team from 1947 to 1950.

== Honours ==
Wisła Kraków

- Ekstraklasa: 1949, 1950, 1951 (Note: Wisła won the 1951 league title, however, the championship title was awarded to the Cup winner Ruch Chorzów.)
- Polish non-League Football Championship: 1947
