= Artur Woźniak =

Polish footballer

Personal information
- Full name: Artur Woźniak
- Date of birth: 10 November 1913
- Place of birth: Kraków, Galicia, Austria-Hungary
- Date of death: 31 May 1991 (aged 77)
- Place of death: Kraków, Poland
- Height: 1.68 m (5 ft 6 in)
- Position: Striker

Senior career*
Years	Team	Apps	(Gls)
1931–1944	Wisła Kraków		
1945–1947	Wisła Kraków		
1948–1949	Orzeł Ząbkowice Śląskie		

International career
1933–1938	Poland	5	(0)

Managerial career
- 1948–1949: Orzeł Ząbkowice Śląskie (player-manager)
- 1951: ŁKS-Włókniarz Łódź
- Włókniarz Kraków
- 1953: Kolejarz Poznań
- 1953–1954: Pafawag Wrocław
- 1955: Zawisza Bydgoszcz
- 1956–1957: Wisła Kraków
- 1959: Wawel Kraków
- 1962: Pafawag Wrocław
- 1962–1964: Odra Opole
- 1964–1966: Ruch Chorzów
- 1966–1967: Zagłębie Sosnowiec
- 1969–1970: Śląsk Wrocław
- 1971–1972: Cracovia
- * Club domestic league appearances and goals

Artur Jan Woźniak (10 November 1913 – 31 May 1991) was a Polish footballer who played as a forward.

For most of his career, Woźniak was loyal to Wisła Kraków, where he played in the years 1931 – 1947, scoring 102 goals in 140 games, and three times becoming vice-champion of the country (1931, 1936, 1947). In 1933 and 1937, Woźniak was top scorer of the Ekstraklasa, with 18 and 12 goals.

During World War II, he was captured by the Nazi German occupiers, and sent to Mauthausen-Gusen concentration camp. After the war, Woźniak remained in Wisła until 1947, then moving to the Recovered Territories, to the newly created club Orzeł Ząbkowice. Then, he became a coach, working with a number of Polish teams, such as ŁKS Łódź, Garbarnia Kraków, Lech Poznań, Zawisza Bydgoszcz, Ruch Chorzów, Zagłębie Sosnowiec, Śląsk Wrocław and Wisła Kraków (1956–1957).

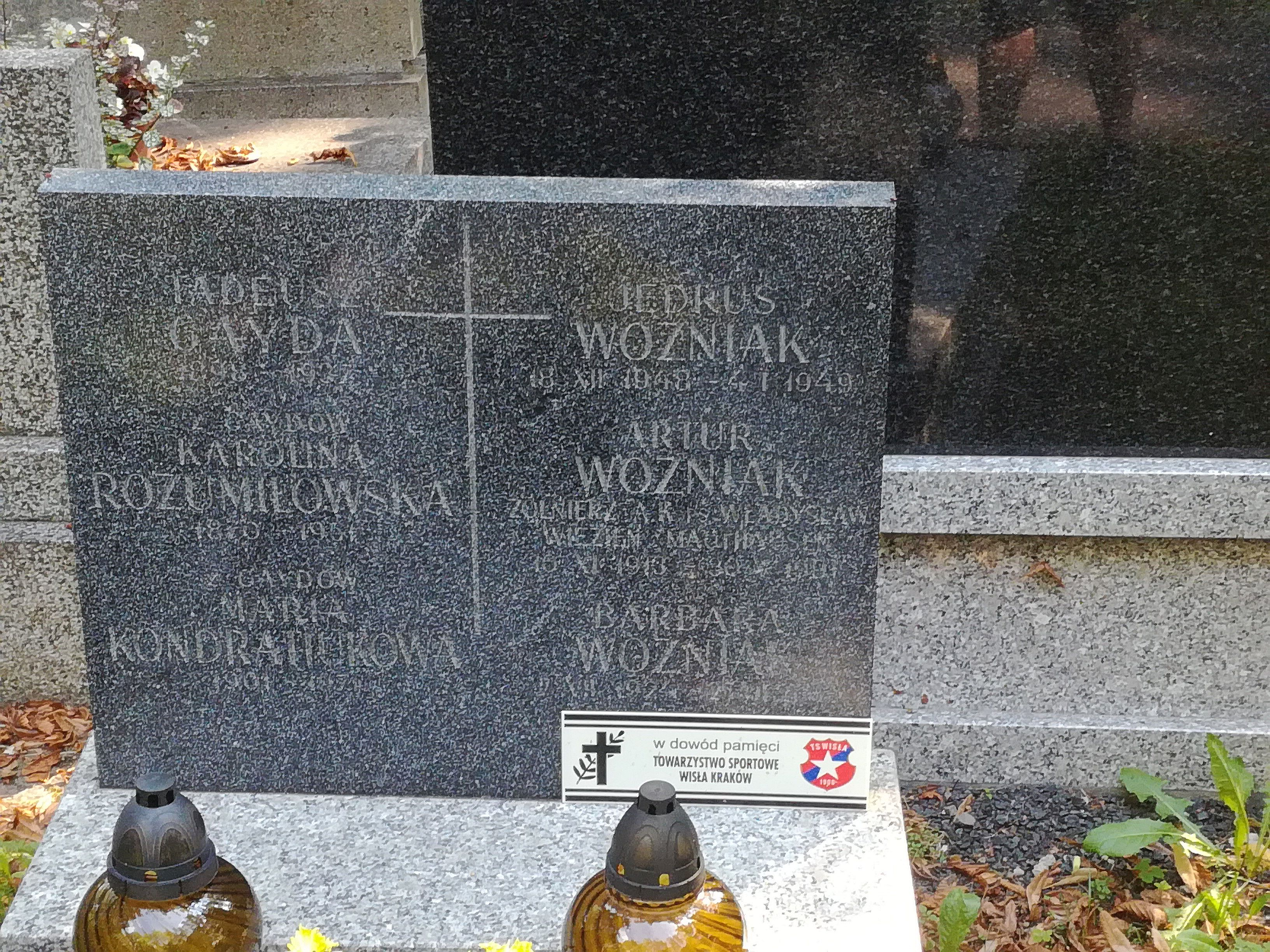
Artur Woźniak's grave at the Rakowicki Cemetery in Kraków

In the mid-1930s, he capped five times for Poland, without scoring a goal.

== Honours ==
Individual

- Ekstraklasa top scorer: 1933, 1937
