= Władysław Giergiel =

Polish footballer (1917–1991)

Personal information
- Full name: Władysław Roman Giergiel
- Date of birth: 29 September 1917
- Place of birth: Kraków, Poland
- Date of death: 17 October 1991 (aged 74)
- Place of death: Wrocław, Poland
- Height: 1.72 m (5 ft 8 in)
- Position: Forward

Senior career*
Years	Team	Apps	(Gls)
–1933	Grzegórzecki KS Kraków		
1933–1949	Wisła Kraków		

International career
1947	Poland	1	(0)

Managerial career
- 1952: Wawel Kraków
- 1953–1954: OWKS Bydgoszcz
- 1954–1955: Polonia Gdańsk
- 1956: Wawel Kraków
- BKS Stal Bielsko-Biała
- Ślęza Wrocław
- Zagłębie Wałbrzych
- 1962–1965: Śląsk Wrocław
- 1965–1966: Górnik Zabrze
- 1967: Bielawianka Bielawa
- 1967–1968: Górnik Wałbrzych
- 1969: Motor Lublin
- 1970–1971: Hutnik Kraków
- BKS Bolesławiec
- 1974–1975: Celuloza Kostrzyn nad Odrą
- 1975–1976: Narew Ostrołęka
- Piast Nowa Ruda
- A.A.C. Eagles (youth)
- * Club domestic league appearances and goals

Władysław Roman Giergiel (29 September 1917 – 17 October 1991) was a Polish football player and manager. A forward, he played for Wisła Kraków and made one appearance for the Poland national team in 1947. He managed Śląsk Wrocław and Górnik Zabrze.

== Honours ==
=== Player ===
Wisła Kraków

- Ekstraklasa: 1949

=== Manager ===
Górnik Zabrze

- Ekstraklasa: 1965–66

Śląsk Wrocław

- II liga: 1963–64
