= Mieczysław Gracz =

Polish footballer (1919–1991)

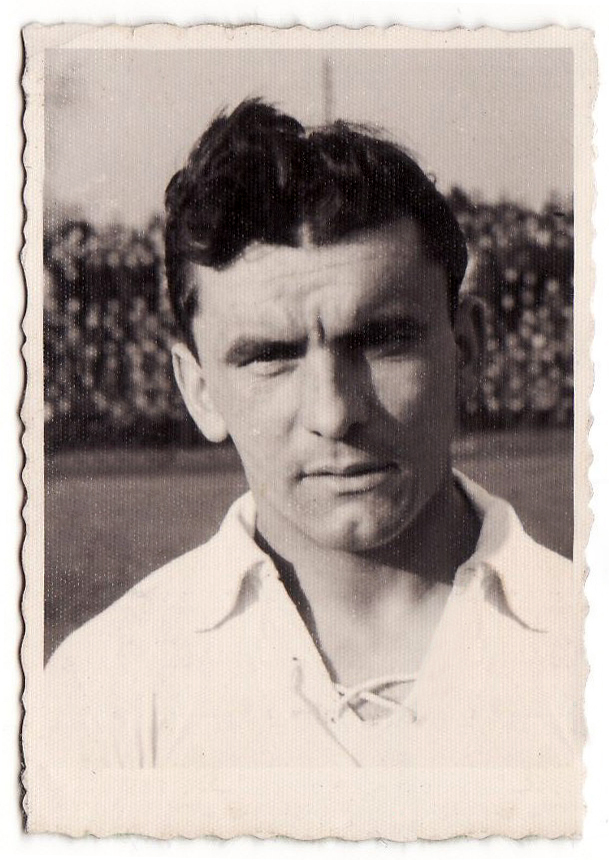

Personal information
- Full name: Mieczysław Karol Gracz
- Date of birth: 3 August 1919
- Place of birth: Kraków, Poland
- Date of death: 21 January 1991 (aged 71)
- Place of death: Kraków, Poland
- Height: 1.63 m (5 ft 4 in)
- Position: Forward

Youth career
- KS Grzegórzecki
- 1933–1935: Wisła Kraków

Senior career*
Years	Team	Apps	(Gls)
1935–1953	Wisła Kraków		

International career
1947–1950	Poland	22	(4)

Managerial career
- 1954–1955: Wisła Kraków
- 1961–1962: Wisła Kraków
- Olimpia Poznań
- 1965–1967: Zawisza Bydgoszcz
- 1967–1969: Wisła Kraków
- Garbarnia Kraków
- 1971–1972: Avia Świdnik
- Wisłoka Dębica
- Stal Zawadzkie
- –1980: Górnik Libiąż
- * Club domestic league appearances and goals

Mieczysław Karol Gracz (3 August 1919 – 21 January 1991) was a Polish footballer who played as a forward for Wisła Kraków. He made 22 appearances for the Poland national team from 1947 to 1950.

== Honours ==
=== Player ===
Wisła Kraków

- Ekstraklasa: 1949, 1950

=== Manager ===
Wisła Kraków

- Polish Cup: 1966–67
