= Garbarnia Kraków =

- Full name: Robotniczy Klub Sportowy; Garbarnia Kraków
- Nicknames: Brązowi (The Browns); Młode Lwy (The Young Lions); Garbarze (The Tanners)
- Founded: 1921; 105 years ago
- Ground: Stadion RKS Garbarnia
- Capacity: 1,000
- Chairman: Jacek Kaim
- Manager: Stanisław Śliwa
- League: V liga Lesser Poland West
- 2025–26: IV liga Lesser Poland, 15th of 19 (relegated)
- Website: garbarnia.krakow.pl
Home colours	Away colours

Garbarnia Kraków is a Polish football and sports club from Ludwinów, a historical district of the city of Kraków. The club's name comes from the nearby tannery (Polish: Garbarnia) of the Dłużyński brothers, which was the original club sponsor. As of the 2026–27 season, they compete in the V liga Lesser Poland West, the sixth tier of Polish football.

== History ==
Founded in 1921, Garbarnia's best years were the late 1920s and early 1930s. In 1928, after winning both regional and national qualifiers, the team was promoted to the Polish Football League. Then, in 1929, after an excellent campaign, they finished second to champions Warta Poznań, thus cementing their position as one of the top teams in Poland.

In 1931, Garbarnia went one better, becoming Polish Champions. Containing little home-grown talent, the Kraków starting lineup consisted of players brought in from other clubs. Among the top players were Otto Riesner and Karol Pazurek, both natives of Katowice, and both of whom played for the Poland national team.

In 1937, after 9 years in the top division, Garbarnia were relegated. They returned in 1939, in a season cut short by the outbreak of World War II.

After the Second World War Garbarnia never regained its status, playing mainly in the Polish Second Division, occasionally managing to win promotion to the first division, only to be relegated after a year or two. The worst was yet to come, as in 1971 the team was relegated to the third division, the Regional Kraków district league.

In 2018, Garbarnia returned to the second-tier after a 44-year absence. Garbarnia secured promotion after a promotion/relegation play-off win over Pogoń Siedlce. In 2019, the club was again relegated to the II liga.

Garbarnia was again relegated in 2023. After withdrawing from the III liga before the start of the 2024–25 season, Garbarnia were demoted to the western group of the V liga Lesser Poland. Their sixth-tier stint lasted for just one season, as they won their group and earned promotion to IV liga Lesser Poland in June 2025.

== Honours ==
- Ekstraklasa
  - Champions: 1931
  - Runners-up: 1929

== Players ==
=== Current squad ===
As of 21 January 2022

Note: Flags indicate national team as defined under FIFA eligibility rules; some limited exceptions apply. Players may hold more than one non-FIFA nationality.

No.	Pos.	Nation	Player
1	GK	POL	Dorian Frątczak
4	DF	POL	Bartłomiej Niedzielski
5	DF	POL	Mateusz Bartków
6	MF	POL	Mateusz Duda
7	MF	POL	Wojciech Słomka
8	MF	SVK	Michal Klec
9	FW	POL	Jakub Kuczera
10	MF	POL	Kamil Kuczak
11	MF	POL	Daniel Morys
15	MF	POL	Grzegorz Marszalik
17	DF	POL	Patryk Warczak (on loan from Wisła Kraków)
19	MF	POL	Bartłomiej Korbecki
20	DF	POL	Mateusz Kardas

No.	Pos.	Nation	Player
22	DF	POL	Jakub Banach
23	MF	POL	Dawid Malik
24	MF	POL	Kacper Ciuruś
28	GK	POL	Bartosz Kieliszek
29	MF	POL	Kacper Duda (on loan from Wisła Kraków)
31	DF	LTU	Donatas Nakrošius
32	DF	POL	Kamil Bentkowski
33	GK	POL	Aleksander Kozioł
53	MF	POL	Wiktor Szywacz (on loan from Wisła Kraków)
55	DF	POL	Mateusz Surma
90	FW	POL	Mateusz Grzybowski
98	MF	POL	Bartłomiej Purcha
99	FW	POL	Michał Feliks

=== Former players ===
- Kais Al-Ani - Iraq youth international

== Managers ==
- Emil Rauchmaul (1933)
