= Football in occupied Poland (1939–1945) =

On September 1, 1939, the armed forces of Nazi Germany invaded Poland from the west initiating World War II. Two weeks later, on September 17, Soviet Union joined Germany in their attack on the Second Polish Republic. By early October, Poland was defeated. The occupied Poland was the only country in Europe where the Nazis had introduced a total ban on regional sports clubs. Football was allowed to be practised only by the Germans in the annexed areas of Upper Silesia. Polish activists and players risked their lives by organizing clandestine football competitions in Kraków, Warsaw and Poznań.

Following Molotov–Ribbentrop Pact, Poland was split between the two occupiers. Eastern regions were annexed by Soviet Union's republics of Ukraine and Belarus, while western part was either directly annexed into Germany, or became General Government – a separate region of the Greater German Reich. The region of Wilno was annexed by Lithuania. Because of the war, ongoing games of the 1939 season of Ekstraklasa were cancelled (if not outright abandoned), with Ruch Chorzów being the top team (see 1939 Ekstraklasa). Furthermore, friendly games of Poland national football team with Yugoslavia and Romania, planned for September 1939, were also cancelled.

== Football in Soviet-occupied Poland (1939 - 1941) ==
In 1939, only one of Ekstraklasa's ten teams was from the region which was later annexed by the Soviets. It was Pogoń Lwów, but in the city of Lwów itself (which is the birthplace of Polish football), there was a number of other teams, such as Czarni Lwów, Lechia Lwów, Hasmonea Lwów, and Ukraina Lwów. Other well-known teams from Soviet-occupied Eastern Poland were Junak Drohobycz, Rewera Stanisławów, Kresy Tarnopol, Ognisko Pińsk, Strzelec Janowa Dolina and WKS Grodno. Little is known about the fate of teams and players from other locations of Soviet occupied Poland, except from the city of Lwów itself.

Unlike German occupiers in Western Poland, the Soviets allowed selected Poles to play football. At the same time, however, all Polish teams were closed, and replaced with Soviet ones, which used the facilities of former Polish teams. Legendary coach Kazimierz Górski, who spent his youth in Lwów and before 1939 had played for RKS Lwów, in the years 1940 - 1941 and 1944, put on the jersey of Soviet teams Spartak Lvov and Dynamo Lvov, before moving to Warsaw in 1945. Other famous players from Lwów, who were allowed to compete in Soviet-sponsored teams, were popular goalkeeper Spirydion Albański and Wacław Kuchar, who was coach of Dynamo Lvov (1939–1941, 1944–1945). Furthermore, Michał Matyas (top scorer of 1935 Ekstraklasa), played for Dynamo Kyiv, and Adam Wolanin, after one year at Dynamo Lvov, moved to play shortly for Spartak Moscow, together with Bolesław Habowski, who played both for Dynamo Moscow and Spartak Moscow. Jan Wasiewicz ended up in Polish Armed Forces in the West, and Adolf Zimmer Pogoń Lwów was murdered in the Katyń Massacre. Wacław Jerzewski, who was Pogoń's player and coach in 1938 - 1939, was after September 1939 interned in Romania, then fought in general Władysław Anders Corps, and returned to Poland after the war.

Little is known about wartime matches of Polish teams from Eastern Poland. Bohdan Tuszyński in his book Za cenę życia (For the price of life) wrote that on July 2, 1944, in German-occupied Lwów, a game between Polish team of the city and German team KONA took place. The Poles won 4–2.

Currently, the memory of the teams from Lwów (now: Lviv, Ukraine) is still vivid in Poland. Among teams which are regarded as successors of Pogoń, there are Polonia Bytom, Odra Opole, and Pogoń Szczecin, while Lechia Gdańsk, with its white-green hues, is a successor to Lechia Lwów. Also, in autumn of 1946 in Lwówek Śląski, sports club Czarni Lwówek was founded, which owes its name to Czarni Lwów. There were several other teams named Czarni in former German province Lower Silesia, where inhabitants of former southeastern Poland moved after the war - Czarni Jelcz-Laskowice, Czarni Żagań and Czarni Otmuchów.

Very interesting is the story of players and officials of Junak Drohobycz, who became actively involved in Polish resistance movement. Before the war, Junak was a team sponsored by the Polish Army, and in late 1939, members of the club created the White Couriers - a boyscouting organization, which smuggled hundreds of persons from the area of Lwow to Hungary, across the newly created Soviet-Hungarian border in the Carpathians. One of the couriers was Stanisław Gerula, goalkeeper of Junak. Most of players of Junak, who at the same time were soldiers, left Drohobycz in the night of September 11/12, 1939. A few days later they reached Hungary, where Colonel Mieczysław Mlotek, manager of Junak, decided to recreate the team. Junak played several games both in Hungary, and Yugoslavia, among top players there were Antoni Komendo-Borowski (previously of Jagiellonia Białystok and Pogoń Lwów) and Henryk Kidacki. In the second half of 1940, all players together with management moved to Tel Aviv, where several games were organized. In 1942, Junak, known as The Team of Polish Army in the East, was in Iraq. Among others, it beat Iraq 6-1 (January 29, 1943), and Iran 3-1 (March 12, 1942, with General Władysław Anders watching the game). The Poles also faced the team of the British Army (with Harry Goslin, Stan Hanson, Don Howe and Ernie Forrest). The game took place in Baghdad.

In late stages of the war, Junak, together with the army, moved to Italy. In 1944 in Naples, the Polish team, under the new name The Carpathians faced the team of Naples, with 35000 in attendance. Besides players from former clubs from Eastern Poland, the Carpathians also capped stars of Polish football from Upper Silesia, who had been drafted into the Wehrmacht, and were caught by the Allies or deserted in Western Europe - Edmund Giemsa, Ewald Cebula, Henryk Janduda of AKS Chorzów, Zygmunt Kulawik of Śląsk Świętochłowice.,

In mid-October 1939, a little-known game took place in Starosielce in the suburbs of Białystok. Soviet troops, which had entered the area a few weeks before, decided that there would be a football match between Polish team of Starosielce and a Red Army team from a unit stationed in nearby Choroszcz. After first half, despite several brutal fauls of Soviet players and partisan refereeing, the Poles were winning 2–0. During the break, an NKVD officer approached the manager of the Poles, telling him that Poles had to lose. Thus, the match ended in a 3–2 Soviet win.

== Football in Lithuanian-occupied city of Wilno (Vilnius) (1939 - 1940) ==
The city of Wilno was home to several teams, but only one, Śmigły Wilno played one season in the Ekstraklasa (see: 1938 Ekstraklasa). On September 19, 1939, Wilno was captured by the Soviets, who on October 26 handed it over to Lithuania. The Soviets returned in June 1940. Little is known about history of Polish football in Wilno during the war. The Lithuanians created their own teams, and players of Śmigły joined them. Defender Bolesław Zawieja played for LFLS Vilnius, forward Józef Tumasz for LGSF Vilnius, goalkeeper Ludwik Łoś and defender Konstanty Paszkiewicz for JSO Vilnius. On June 16, 1940, as Gazeta Codzienna Polish language daily announced, a match between teams of Kaunas and Vilnius took place. Vilnius’ team was almost exclusively made of Polish players of pre-1939 Śmigły, and Kaunas won 6–1. Longin Korwin-Pawłowski, the only player of Śmigły who capped for Poland in 1937, ended up in a German POW camp, and after the war settled in Canada, where in 1968 - 1969 he was leader of Polish scouting.

== Football in German-occupied Poland (1939 - 1945) ==
Following Polish September Campaign, the Germans occupied western and central Poland, the area where football was much better developed. Out of ten teams of the 1939 Ekstraklasa, only one came from Eastern Poland (Pogoń Lwów), and main centers of interbellum Polish football were located in Warsaw, Kraków, Poznań, Łódź, and Polish part of Upper Silesia. German occupiers immediately banned all ethnic Poles from playing football, allowing only those who signed the Volksliste. As a result, all Polish clubs were closed, except for those from Upper Silesia, which were allowed to operate under new, German-sounding names.

=== Football in German-occupied Warsaw ===
In 1939, Warsaw had two teams in Ekstraklasa - Polonia Warszawa, and Warszawianka Warszawa. Immediately after capture of the city, the Germans closed all Polish clubs, and players were forced to go underground. In spring of 1940, first games were organized in Mokotów Field by Józef Ciszewski, former player of Cracovia and Legia Warsaw. Soon afterwards, in summer of 1940, regular games started, with prewar teams participating under changed names - e.g., players of Polonia Warszawa created teams of Pochodnia, Czarni, and Bimber. Before German authorities seized Polonia's stadium on Konwiktorska Street, in September 1940, a tournament with thirteen teams took place there. In the final game (September 13, 1940), Czarni beat Bimber 3-1.

On December 24, 1941, Alfred Nowakowski created underground Warsaw District of Association Football, and in 1942 games of Warsaw Championship began, with teams not only from Warsaw, but from suburbs, such as Wołomin, Góra Kalwaria, Brwinów, and Piaseczno. Both in 1942 and 1943 champions were re-created Polonia Warszawa. Since matches attracted thousands of fans, and Warsaw was too dangerous because of presence of numerous German soldiers, most of them took place in the suburbs, in such towns, as Piaseczno, Konstancin-Jeziorna, Błonie, and Mirków. In Piaseczno, on Easter Boxing Day 1943, a game between the teams of Warsaw and Kraków took place, ending in a 1–1 draw, with hundreds of spectators watching. Also, in mid-1942, an unusual game took place in Legionowo. Huragan Wołomin faced a team made of German and Bulgarian soldiers, stationed in the town. Poles won 3–2, after a very heated match. Among most active football teams of occupied Warsaw was Okęcie Warszawa, which played over 100 matches. During the war, Okęcie kept four teams, including two of junior players. In 1942, Okęcie was second in Championship of Warsaw, after Polonia.

Last wartime championship took place in 1944, but due to Warsaw Uprising, it was not finished. With some fifty teams, Warsaw was one of main centers of Polish football in those years, which was confirmed in the first postwar Polish Championship (1946), won by Polonia.

=== Football in German-occupied Kraków ===
Kraków was another center of Polish football - in 1939 Ekstraklasa, out of ten teams, as many as three (Wisła Kraków, Cracovia Kraków, and Garbarnia Kraków) were from that city. It took only a few weeks of occupation for local football officials and players to organize first underground wartime game. On October 22, 1939, in Bronowice, Wisła beat Krowodrza 3-1.

On August 7, 1940, first wartime Championship of Kraków began in Sports Park Juvenia. A few days earlier, on July 23, Hans Frank had issued a decree, which officially dissolved Polish associations, including sports clubs on the territory of General Government. However, Juvenia official Aleksander Wódka was allowed to use the grounds of the Sports Park in any way he liked, so football pitch there for two years was the arena of a number of matches, with German authorities giving unofficial permission. Eight teams participated in the 1940 Championship: Bloki, Cracovia, Garbarnia, Groble, Juvenia, Sparta, Wisła and Zwierzyniecki, and the champion was Wisła, winning all games, with goal difference 52-8. Second was Cracovia, third Garbarnia. The tournament was popular among local fans, attracting up to 3000 people for top games.

Second Championship took place in summer and early fall of 1941 (between June 14, and October 19, with 79 games played). Poles were banned from practising organized sports, but at the same time, they were allowed to use Juvenia Parks’ facilities, which gave them a chance to keep playing. There were no qualifiers for the Championship, and thirteen teams took place in it: AKS, Bloki, Cracovia, Dębnicki, Garbarnia, Groble, Juvenia, Kazimierz, Prądniczanka, Sparta, Wawel, Wisła and Zwierzyniecki. After all rounds, it turned out that both Wisła and Cracovia had equal number of points, so additional game was necessary, which was won by Wisła 3-2. As organizers of the tournament later wrote, German soldiers and officers were frequent guests at games, but they did not disturb them.

In 1942, after closing of Juvenia Sports Park, no championship took place, due to increased terror. The Championships of Kraków returned in 1943, but this time they took place on several fields both in the city, and in the suburbs. Several new teams were created, and German authorities did not seem to be interested in these activities. After a July 6, 1943, meeting of officials, 22 teams applied for participation, and three groups were created. Games took place in suburban districts of Borek, Łagiewniki, Rakowice and Wieczysta. The 1943 Championship of Kraków was remembered for years because of events which took place during and after most games. Players, officials and supporters of teams would fight each other - on August 1, 1943, during a game between Łagiewianka and Wisła, a group of Łagiewianka officials and fans entered the pitch to beat up the referee and Wisła players. The game was ended eight minutes before time. A week later, there were disturbances during games Groble - Nadwiślan (in Borek Fałęcki), and Dąbski - Czarni (in Rakowice), and Blue Police had to intervene. Due to those disturbances, on August 10, 1943, all games were cancelled. The decision was changed after the August 15 meeting, but it did not help, as soon afterwards, during the game Rakowiczanka - Cracovia, further riots took place.

On Sunday, October 17, 1943, at 3 p.m., final game of the 1943 Kraków Championship took place at Garbarnia Stadium, with some 10,000 spectators. The game between Wisła and Cracovia ended with a gigantic fight between supporters of both teams, after referee Tadeusz Milusiński awarded a penalty kick to Cracovia, after Wisła's player touched the ball with a hand in the box. In response, Wisła's Mieczysław Gracz kicked the referee, and Wisła's players left the pitch, urged by their officials. Fights between angry fans moved on to the streets of Kraków's district of Podgórze. German authorities did not intervene, as the military commandant of the district, Hans Mitschke, stated that "football fans were the same everywhere". As a result, the game was settled as 3-0 for Cracovia.

The matches of the 1944 Championship of Kraków were not fully completed, due to increasing terror of the occupation.

=== Football in German-occupied Upper Silesia ===
Unlike in other parts of Poland, German authorities in Upper Silesia allowed all teams to continue their activities, but they were ordered to change their names. Thus AKS Chorzów became Fussball Verein Germania Königshütte, Ruch Chorzów - Bismarckhütter SV 99, Naprzód Lipiny - TuS Lipine, and Śląsk Świętochłowice - TuS Schwientochlowitz (for more information see Gauliga Schlesien).

In the late 1930s, bulk of players of National Team of Poland were from Upper Silesia; in some games there were eight Silesians in the starting lineup. Most popular football star of interwar Poland, Ernest Wilimowski, capped several times for Germany in the early 1940s, and other top players, from the region such as Gerard Wodarz, Jerzy Wostal, Teodor Peterek, Wilhelm Góra, Leonard Piątek, Ewald Dytko, Erwin Nyc, after signing the Volksliste, were allowed to continue playing. Eventually, most of them were drafted to the Wehrmacht. Some time in early stages of the war, Leonard Piątek went to Kraków, to ask Józef Kałuża if he would let him and his colleagues play for German teams. Kałuża answered in the affirmative.

=== Football in other locations ===
Underground football games also took place in other locations of occupied Poland.

- during the occupation of Bydgoszcz youth focused in particular districts unfolded enjoying great interest in football meetings. One of the initiators of these meetings was Stanisław Dąbrowski (before the war striker in the juniors of Brda Bydgoszcz). Football teams existed in some neighborhoods of the city from which borrowed its name. In the "Wilczak" team played three Buhl brothers, player and at the same time the head of the team "Prądy" was Jan Dolata (before the war goalkeeper at OPN Sokól V Bydgoszcz and KS Kabel Polski Bydgoszcz), in the eleven "Plac Kościuszki" played Jan Świtała, and in the team, "Okole" outstanding player was Stanisław Dąbrowski.
- during the war, there were games of Championship of Łódź. First underground Polish teams there were created in late 1939 and early 1940, among youth of districts of Widzew, Karolew, Ruda Pabianicka and Retkinia, also in towns of Zgierz and Pabianice. It has been established that in 1942, the final match between Cytadela and Wólka, was ended 10 minutes before time. Several Polish teams were active in the city during the occupation. According to the webpage of Łódź Office of Polish Football Association, these were: Wólka, Wola, Wicher (which was made of players of ŁKS Łódź), Cytadela, Widzew, Zdrowie, Ruda, Chojny, Retkinia, Harcerze, Klapitka, Pabianice and Zgierz. Most active football team of wartime Łódź was Widzew, which played several games in that period, but the best team of wartime Łódź was Wólka. On October 24, 1943, the game between Wólka and Wicher was interrupted by German police. Many players and fans were arrested, and taken to a police station, but all were released after paying the ticket in the amount of 10 reichsmarks.
- in Piotrków Trybunalski, there were five teams: Huta (now Concordia), Bugaj - Zryw, Pekin - Ruch, Arba (former Zakład Skórzany). Since 1940, they played regular games, with lookouts scanning the area, as Germans tried to catch players.
- in Rzeszów, games of Resovia Rzeszów were organized since 1942 in neighboring town of Strzyzów, regarded as a safer location. Like in other places of the occupied country, players risked arrest, but their love of the game was more important. Among those who took part in those games were Edmund Białas of Lech Poznań, who lived in Rzeszów during the war, and Tadeusz Hogendorf, legendary player of Resovia and Warszawianka Warszawa. Hogendorf recalled later that Germans asked Poles to play against them. Matches took place somewhere near Dębica, and Germans provided transportation for Polish players.
- in Proszowice, on August 15, 1942, a game between local team Proszowianka and a team of players from Kraków took place. Also, there was a game between Proszowianka and a team of German soldiers, stationed in the town. The match took place some time in fall of 1943, the Germans won 4–1.
- in Słomniki near Kraków, local team Słomniczanka continued its activity, with German commandant of the town unofficially allowing matches. During the war, there were several games vs. teams from Kraków, also vs. a team of Wehrmacht soldiers. Furthermore, Słomniczanka hosted teams from local towns - Wolbrom, Kazimierza Wielka, Skała, Proszowice, Miechów, Nowe Brzesko, Pilica.
- football games also took place in the region of Zagłębie Dąbrowskie. Several teams were active there - from Sosnowiec (Unia Sosnowiec), Czeladź, Dąbrowa Górnicza, Będzin, districts of Niwka, Zagórze, and Piaski. Some time in the early 1940s, underground championship of the region took place, won by AKS Niwka.
- in Siedlce, where several unofficial teams were active during the war (Mydlarze, Goryle, Kolejarze, Czarni), a game between Polish side of the city and a team of Wehrmacht took place in 1940. The game was won by the Poles, and several Polish players had to hide for some time, fearing arrest by angry Germans.
- in Jędrzejów, in the years 1941 - 1942, there were games between local team and teams of Kielce and Wolbrom. For fear of Germans, these matches took place on a meadow in the neighboring village of Piaski.
- games also took place in Sandomierz. According to the webpage of Town Center of Sports and Recreation, during a break in a secret game, partisans of Jędrusie executed a local Nazi official.
- even though German authorities expelled thousands of Polish inhabitants of Gdynia, and named the city Gotenhafen (see Expulsion of Poles by Nazi Germany), remaining officials and players of Bałtyk Gdynia organized games, which took place in Rumia - Zagórze, with a number of people watching.
- in Grójec, two games were organized in 1941. During the second match, the Germans organized a roundup, arresting nine people. After that incident, no more games took place in the town.
- games for the championship of the city were organized in Lublin, with such teams, as Promień, Kolejarz, Bronowiczanka, Unia, Garbarnia, Rurowianka, Wrotkowia, KS Lublinianka and Starówka. Lublin players twice went on bicycles to Dęblin, to play a local team. Last wartime championship of the city was won by Unia. In August 1944, when the Wehrmacht had already been pushed behind the Vistula, a game between team of Lublin and team of Italian POW's, released from camps, took place. With thousands of fans and Red Army officers watching, the Poles won 2–1.
- since Tarnów was too dangerous, players of Tarnovia Tarnów and other local teams organized matches in such towns, as Ciężkowice, Bobowa, Limanowa, and Krzyż.
- in Jasło, the Germans seized stadium of Czarni, so local players were forced to play in neighboring villages, such as Męcinka. Also, a game between Jasło and Strzyżów took place in Strzyżów, with the guests winning 5–3. Underground matches also were organized in the towns of Krosno, Lesko, and Sanok, mostly on meadows.
- German occupiers forced a number of inhabitants of Czechowice-Dziedzice to move to Bavaria, especially to the town of Kirchenlamitz, where they worked in local factories. Several illegal games took place in Kirchenlamitz, between players of prewar local rivals RKS Czechowice and SKS Grażyna Dziedzice. In the same town, an unusual game between Polish and French workers was organized, won by Poles 4-2. Among French players there allegedly was Henri Doudin of FC Rennes, and the match referee was a Dutchman named Simon van Aperen from Vlaardingen.
- in Chełm, due to efforts of prewar sports official Zygmunt Berezecki, three games took place between Polish players of pre-1939 team Kolejowe Przysposobienie Wojskowe, and Germans from units stationed in the town.

== German teams in occupied Poland ==
Germans held their own regional championships, with Gauligas organized in occupied territories. For more information, see Gauliga Danzig-Westpreußen, Gauliga Generalgouvernement, Gauliga Wartheland, Gauliga Schlesien.

== See also ==
- History of Poland (1939–1945)
- Poland national football team
- Football in Poland
