= 1939 in Poland =

- Decades: 1910s; 1920s; 1930s; 1940s; 1950s
- See also: Other events of 1939; Timeline of Polish history

== Political incumbents ==
On September 30, 1939, the last government of the Second Polish Republic which resided in Warsaw was dissolved. The government was originally designed on May 15, 1936, by Polish president Ignacy Mościcki under prime minister Felicjan Sławoj Składkowski.

=== Members of the government ===
- President of Poland – Ignacy Mościcki,
- Prime Minister – Felicjan Sławoj Składkowski,
- Deputy Prime Minister and Minister of Treasury – Eugeniusz Kwiatkowski,
- Minister of Foreign Affairs – Józef Beck,
- Minister of Justice – Witold Grabowski,
- Minister of Military Affairs – Tadeusz Kasprzycki,
- Minister of Agriculture – Juliusz Poniatowski,
- Minister of Communication – Juliusz Ulrych,
- Minister of Post Office and Telegraphs – Emil Kaliński,
- Minister of Religious Beliefs and Public Enlightenment – Wojciech Świętosławski,
- Minister of Industry and Trade – Antoni Roman.

=== Other personalities ===
- Primate of Poland – August Hlond
- Eastern Orthodox Church Archbishop of Warsaw – Dionizy (Dionisij, real name Konstantyn Waledynski)
- Chief Rabbi of Warsaw – vacant
- Marshall of the Sejm – Wacław Makowski
- Marshall of the Senat – Bogusław Miedziński
- Ambassador to Germany – Józef Lipski

== Events ==
=== January ===
- January 1. Józef Beck welcomes the new year in Monte Carlo, while president Ignacy Mościcki stays in Jaworzyna near Zakopane
- January 2. Flu epidemic in Zagłębie Dąbrowskie, where 25% of residents are sick
- January 3. In Warsaw a funeral of Cardinal Aleksander Kakowski (who died on December 31, 1938), takes place. The service is led by primate August Hlond, and by bishop Antoni Szlagowski
- January 4. Józef Beck arrives in Munich
- January 5. Minister Józef Beck meets Adolf Hitler in Berchtesgaden. Apart from Hitler and Beck, the meeting is attended by Joachim von Ribbentrop, Hans von Moltke, Polish ambassador to Berlin Józef Lipski, and Józef Beck's chef de cabinet, Michal Lubienski. The meeting lasts three hours
- January 6. In Munich, minister Beck meets Joachim von Ribbentrop
- January 7. In Warsaw, a funeral of Roman Dmowski takes place. Jadwiga Wajs gets married in Łódź
- January 8. President Mościcki returns to Warsaw, where he meets foreign diplomats and ambassadors to Poland. On the same day, Jurgis Šaulys, a Lithuanian envoy, begins his mission in Warsaw
- January 25. Joachim von Ribbentrop comes by train to Warsaw, he arrives at Warsaw Główna rail station 4:50 p.m.
- January 26. Joachim von Ribbentrop meets Ignacy Mościcki, Józef Beck and Edward Rydz-Śmigły
- January 27. Joachim von Ribbentrop leaves Warsaw and returns to Berlin

=== February ===
- February 18. Heinrich Himmler comes to Warsaw. After meeting Eugeniusz Kwiatkowski and Józef Beck, he leaves in the night for Białowieża
- February 19. Flooding in Volhynia, along the Horyn and the Styr. Heinrich Himmler hunts in Białowieża, together with Marian Zyndram-Kościałkowski
- February 20. Heinrich Himmler returns to Berlin
- February 22. First flights of the PZL.50 Jastrząb. Polish Telegraphic Agency announces that Trans-Olza hence will be called Western Silesia
- February 24. AntiPolish riots at the Königliche Technische Hochschule zu Danzig in Gdańsk. Polish students are beaten
- February 25. Warsaw students demonstrate in front of the German embassy. Galeazzo Ciano, together with wife Edda Mussolini, comes by train to Warsaw
- February 26. Galeazzo Ciano unveils the monument of Francesco Nullo in Warsaw

=== March ===
- March 1. On the last day of his visit, Galeazzo Ciano visits Kraków
- March 2. A hurricane in Wilno destroys several houses
- March 4. Romanian minister of foreign affairs, Grigore Gafencu, comes to Warsaw by train, greeted by Józef Beck, Stefan Starzyński and Jan Szembek
- March 6. Grigore Gafencu returns to Bucharest. A group of Polish writers, including Konstanty Ildefons Gałczyński, visits Trans-Olza
- March 16. Units of Hungarian Army meet troops of the Polish Army, after Hungarian invasion of Carpatho-Ukraine
- March 17. In Berlin, Józef Lipski meets Hermann Göring, discussing establishment of Protectorate of Bohemia and Moravia
- March 22. A meeting of key Polish figures takes place at the Warsaw Castle. Present are Ignacy Mościcki, Edward Rydz-Śmigły, Józef Beck and Eugeniusz Kwiatkowski. All agree that Poland will not accept German proposal of extraterritorial rail and road connection between East Prussia and the rest of Germany. On the same day, Stanisław Mackiewicz is imprisoned in the Bereza Kartuska detention camp
- March 26. In Berlin, Polish ambassador Józef Lipski meets Joachim von Ribbentrop, who demands that Gdańsk becomes part of Germany. Lipski, following Beck's order, refuses
- March 30. In Warsaw, British ambassador Howard Kennard asks Józef Beck if Poland will accept British guarantees. Beck answers in the affirmative. On the same day, Wincenty Witos returns to Poland and stays in Kraków
- March 31. In London, prime minister Neville Chamberlain officially declares that Great Britain will help Poland in case of war

=== April ===
- April 2. In the afternoon, Józef Beck leaves Warsaw and goes by train to London. On his way, he stops at Berlin, to meet ambassador Józef Lipski
- April 4. Józef Beck meets at breakfast with lord Halifax and Winston Churchill in London. On the same day in the afternoon, Beck talks with Neville Chamberlain
- April 5. In London, Józef Beck meets king George VI at Windsor Castle. In Warsaw, a funeral of Walery Sławek takes place
- April 8. Stanisław Mackiewicz is released from Bereza Kartuska. Józef Beck returns to Warsaw
- April 11. Adolf Hitler signs Fall Weiss
- April 14. In Warsaw, Józef Beck meets Hungarian attaché, Andreas Hory
- April 17. General Johan Laidoner, Commander-in-chief of the Estonian Army, comes to Warsaw
- April 18. A regular air connection Warsaw – Copenhagen – London is opened
- April 19. ORP Sęp (1938), built in the Netherlands, comes to Gdynia
- April 22. General Johan Laidoner visits Kraków. Anatole de Monzie, French Minister of Public Works, comes to Poland
- April 23. A 49-kilometer railroad connection Częstochowa – Chorzew Siemkowice, part of the Polish Coal Trunk-Line is opened
- April 24. Józef Beck meets British ambassador, Sir Howard Kennard. Wojciech Korfanty returns to Poland. He comes to Poznań and talks to Primate August Hlond
- April 30. In Gross Strehlitz near Oppeln, personnel of the Polish Theatre from Katowice is beaten by a Nazi crowd. In Warsaw, a great air show takes place. Poznań International Fair opens in Poznań

=== May ===
- May 2. Polish Council of Ministers approves a bill according to which the President can issue decrees. A local election in Volhynia takes place
- May 3. A military parade, to commemorate the Constitution Day, takes place in Warsaw
- May 4. Marshall Edward Rydz-Śmigły meets schoolchildren from Warsaw and Trans-Olza
- May 5. Józef Beck delivers a famous speech in the Sejm, in which he rejects Hitler's demands towards Poland
- May 7. Mass patriotic demonstrations of peasants and workers take place across Poland, with the biggest in Warsaw and Tarnów
- May 9. General Stasys Raštikis, Defense Minister of Lithuania, comes to Warsaw
- May 11. Polish ambassador in Moscow, Wacław Grzybowski, meets Vyacheslav Molotov
- May 12. A mutual help agreement between France and Poland is signed in Paris by Polish ambassador Juliusz Łukasiewicz and French Minister of Foreign Affairs, Georges Bonnet
- May 13. Galeazzo Ciano informs Józef Beck that in case of future Polish-German conflict, Italy will support Germany
- May 15. General Tadeusz Kasprzycki begins in Paris negotiations about military help with General Maurice Gamelin
- May 16. General Wacław Stachiewicz orders his subordinates to create a plan of fortifications along the Polish-German border
- May 18. Floods in Poland, in the areas of Kielce and Lwów
- May 19. Polish-French military negotiations end in Paris. Both sides pledge to help each other in case of war
- May 23. Polish-British military negotiations begin in Warsaw. Józef Beck meets General Józef Haller
- May 26. Nationwide local elections are finished, with Obóz Zjednoczenia Narodowego winning 48% of votes. A Polish Institute is opened in Budapest
- May 30. The funeral of Aleksander Brückner takes place in Berlin

=== June ===
- June 2. A new ambassador of the Soviet Union, Nikolai Sharonov, comes to Warsaw and begins his mission
- June 6. A dangerous fire in the unfinished complex of the Warsaw Główna rail station
- June 7. Seven people die, when an express train Katowice – Warszawa derails near Pruszków
- June 11. President Ignacy Mościcki begins a tour of the Central Industrial Area
- June 13. A delegation of the Polish government, under Adam Koc, comes to London, to negotiate a loan for Polish Army
- June 15. Polish Airlines open new connections: Gdynia – Warsaw – Budapest – Venice – Rome, and Warsaw – Budapest – Belgrad
- June 16. A heat wave in Poland, with temperatures ranging from 35 C in Zaleszczyki, to 21 in Poznań, Toruń and Gdynia. Representatives of Polonia from the United States collect $750,000 to the National Defence Fund
- June 21. A Convention of 300 Polish rabbis begins in Wilno
- June 23. In Polish schools, summer vacation begins
- June 24. Annual Days of the Sea begin in Gdynia. General Louis Faury visits Polish garrisons
- June 26. Florian Znaniecki leaves Poland for a series of lectures at American universities
- June 29. Jan Kiepura, together with wife Marta Eggerth, sing to thousands of people on the Old Town Market Place, Warsaw. All profits were given to the National Defence Fund

=== July ===
- July 5. Grand Rabbi Ben Zion Halberstam of Bobov visits Oświęcim, enthusiastically greeted by some 3000 followers
- July 6. At Warsaw's Castle, a meeting of Ignacy Mościcki, Felicjan Sławoj Składkowski, Edward Rydz-Śmigły and Józef Beck takes place. The gathered discuss Polish policies concerning the Free City of Danzig
- July 8. Due to unusually hot and sunny weather, harvest begins in Poland earlier than usually
- July 7. King of Albania Zog, comes to Lwów and, after a short break, he goes to Warsaw together with family
- July 10. Neville Chamberlain, speaking in the House of Commons, states that Britain is determined to help Poland in case of an attack
- July 11. In Jazłowiec, the 14th Regiment of Jazłowiec Uhlans celebrates its day
- July 13. Felicjan Sławoj Składkowski tours the Poznań Voivodeship
- July 15. On the anniversary of the Battle of Grunwald, a mass demonstration takes place in Kraków. On the same day in Katowice, Jan Kiepura sings to 20 000 people, with profits going to the National Defence Fund
- July 17. General Sir Edmund Ironside of the British Army comes to Warsaw, via Gdynia. Jan Kiepura sings to 10,000 people in Karwina, Trans-Olza
- July 18. General Ironside visits the Tomb of the Unknown Soldier, Warsaw
- July 20. General Ironside visits garrisons of the Polish Army in Rembertów and Modlin. Wojciech Korfanty leaves prison
- July 27. MS Batory, a passenger ship, enters service in the port of Gdynia

=== August ===
- August 1. Officers of Polish Police arrest in Lwów around 30 activists of the Organization of Ukrainian Nationalists
- August 2. In London, governments of Poland and Great Britain sign an agreement according to which Poland gets a loan in the amount of 8 million British pounds (200 million Polish zlotys). Poland initially demanded four times as much. On the same day, Benedictine monks return to the abbey in Tyniec
- August 4. Polish customs officers in the Free City of Danzig are informed that they no longer can make inspections in the port. On the next day, under Polish pressure, the Senate of Danzig voids the decision
- August 6. In Kraków, the 25th anniversary of First Cadre Company's departure is celebrated with estimated 200,000 watching the parade
- August 8. A Polish-Hungarian celebration takes place at the Cross of the Legions in eastern Carpathians
- August 9. Polish chargé d'affaires in Berlin, Stefan Lubomirski, meets Ernst von Weizsäcker, who hands Lubomirski a note from von Ribbentrop about tense situation in the Free City of Danzig
- August 10. In Warsaw, Tomasz Arciszewski meets German chargé d'affaires, Johan von Wuhlisch. On the same day, Gauleiter Albert Forster makes a speech in Danzig, telling the crowds that the city will soon return to Germany
- August 11. A conference of Józef Beck, Eugeniusz Kwiatkowski, Ignacy Mościcki, Felicjan Sławoj Składkowski and Edward Rydz-Śmigły, takes place at the Warsaw Castle
- August 12. In Moscow, talks between military delegations of France, Great Britain and Soviet Union begin
- August 13. Partial mobilization of the Polish Army
- August 15. Poland celebrates 19th anniversary of the Miracle at the Vistula (see: Battle of Warsaw (1920)), with the biggest demonstration taking place in Radzymin. On the same day in Moscow, Vyacheslav Molotov talks with German ambassador to the Soviet Union, Friedrich Schullenburg. Schullenburg informs Molotov about von Ribbentrop's willingness to come to Moscow
- August 17. French government grants Polish government credit in the amount of 430 million French francs
- August 19. In Warsaw, Józef Beck, talking to British ambassador Howard Kennard and French ambassador Léon Noël, says that Polish government will not give permission for the Red Army to enter Polish territory in case of war with Germany. On the same day, Northern Trade Fair opens in Wilno
- August 20. In Katowice, funeral of Wojciech Korfanty takes place

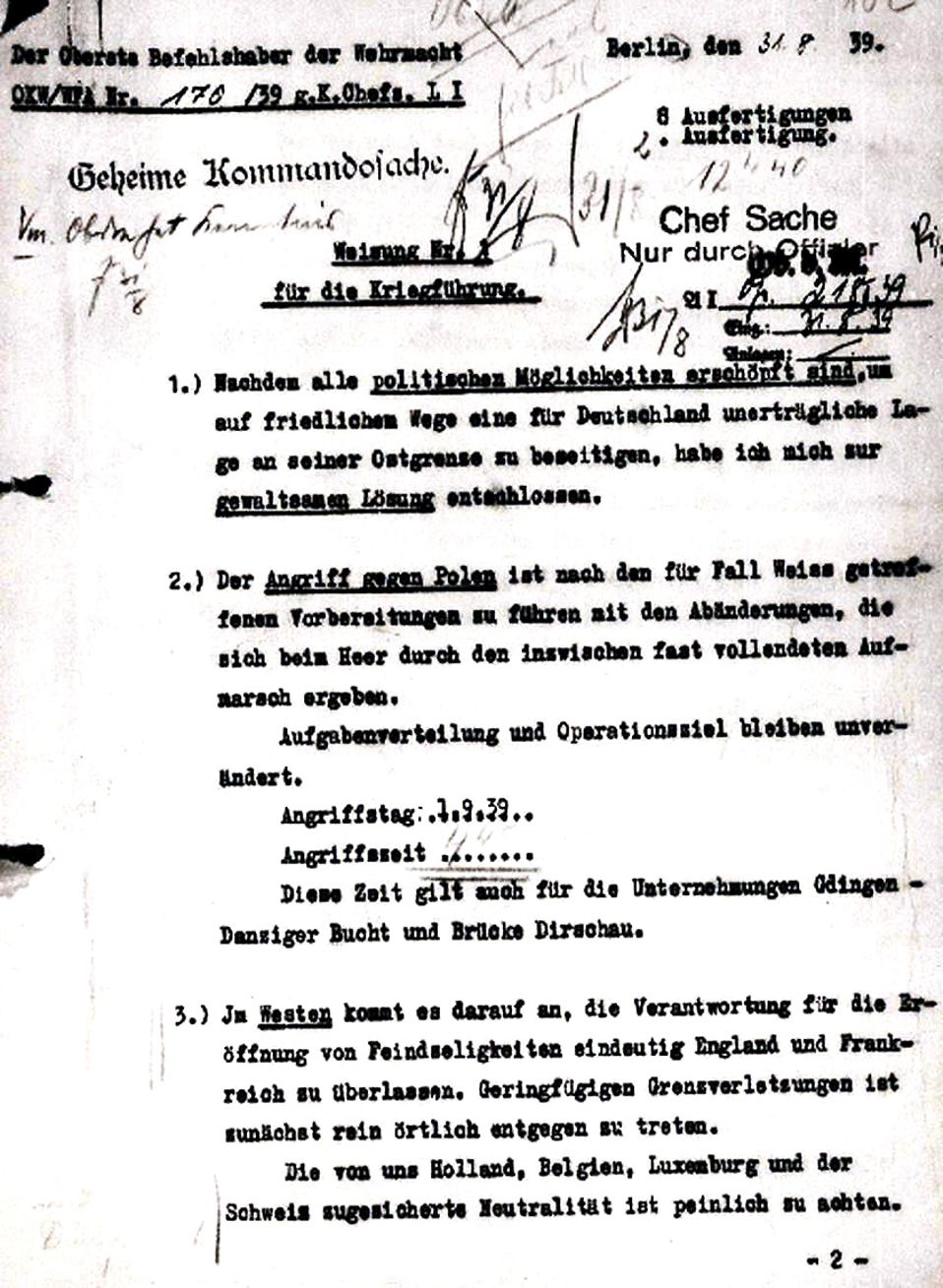
First page of an official order of Adolf Hitler dated 31.08.1939 for an attack against Poland – beginning of World War II

- August 22. Heat in Poland, with temperatures reaching up to 31 degrees Celsius in Pomerania. Edward Rydz-Śmigły orders alarm mobilization in military districts along western border of Poland. Joachim von Ribbentrop leaves Berlin for Moscow
- August 23. In Moscow, Molotov–Ribbentrop Pact is signed
- August 24. In the morning, secret mobilization takes place in Poland, which covers around 75% of the Polish Army manpower
- August 25. Pact of mutual help between Poland and Great Britain is signed in London. In Moscow, Soviet–French–British negotiations end. German battleship Schleswig-Holstein anchoress in the channel near Westerplatte
- August 26. Adolf Hitler changes his order and attack on Poland is postponed to September 1. Nevertheless, some Wehrmacht units attack, especially in the south. Józef Beck meets Soviet ambassador, Nikolai Sharonov
- August 28. German chargé d'affaires, Ernst Krummer meets Jan Szembek. Krummer declares that the German–Polish Non-Aggression Pact is unilaterally abrogated by Adolf Hitler. On the same day, Hitler speaks at Reichstag, and the speech is broadcast by the radio (see: List of Adolf Hitler speeches). 20 people die in the Tarnów rail station bomb attack
- August 30. The Polish destroyers ORP Burza, ORP Błyskawica and ORP Grom are ordered to execute the Peking Plan, and the warships head for Great Britain. A mobilisation of the Polish Army is ordered
- August 31. Gleiwitz incident. Polish ambassador in Berlin, Józef Lipski, for the last time sees Joachim von Ribbentrop. At 12:40 pm, Adolf Hitler gives an order to attack Poland on September 1, at 4:45 am

=== September ===
- September 1 – Poland is invaded by Nazi Germany, this precipitates the start of the Second World War.
- September 17 – Poland is invaded by USSR
- September 22. Joint Nazi-Soviet military parade in Brzesc nad Bugiem

=== October ===
- October 1. In Paris, a Government in Exile, under General Władysław Sikorski, is sworn
- October 2. Polish Army garrison in Hel capitulate. Governments of the United States and France officially recognize the government of General Sikorski. battle of Kock begins
- October 4. In Wilno, the NKVD incarcerates Colonel Zygmunt Berling
- October 5. Adolf Hitler greets German troops during the parade of victory in Warsaw. Battle of Kock ends
- October 7. Adolf Hitler orders Heinrich Himmler to organize mass expulsions of Poles from western part of the occupied country. In Eastern Poland, electoral campaign begins
- October 8. Upon decree of Hitler, Western provinces of Poland, with a population of 10 million and the area of 91 000 km^{2}, together with the cities of Poznań, Gdynia, Toruń, Bydgoszcz, Łódź and Katowice are incorporated into the Third Reich
- October 10. In Kiev, Soviet authorities arrest consul of Poland, Janusz Matuszynski, who vanishes without a trace
- October 11. General Kazimierz Sosnkowski reaches Paris
- October 12. General Government, with capital in Kraków, is created
- October 16. Polish consul in Kaunas, Franciszek Charwat, leaves Lithuania, after both countries broke diplomatic relations when Lithuania incorporated the area of Wilno
- October 19. The Germans transport to Berlin archives of the Polish Foreign Ministry
- October 22. "Elections" in the Soviet-occupied areas of eastern Poland, marked by terror of the NKVD troops
- October 23. Last Polish Army unit in Eastern Poland is dissolved near Orany. It was commanded by Colonel Władysław Wysocki
- October 24. Nikita Khrushchev, talking to General Władysław Langner assures him that officers of the Polish Army, kept by the Soviets, will be released (see: Katyn massacre)
- October 25. Since September 1, the Germans, in 700 mass executions, murdered around 16,000 Polish civilians
- October 26. Hans Frank is appointed Governor-General of the Germany-occupied territories. In Lwów, first meeting of the People's Assembly of Western Ukraine takes place
- October 27. Stefan Starzyński is arrested in Warsaw. In Lwów, the NKVD arrests General Marian Zegota-Januszajtis
- October 28. Lithuanian Army units enter Wilno. According to German data, there are 360,000 Jews in Warsaw. In Białystok, first meeting of the People's Assembly of Western Belarus takes place

=== November ===
- November 1. Upon decree of the Supreme Soviet of the Soviet Union, southeastern part of Poland (see: Territories of Poland annexed by the Soviet Union) is incorporated into Soviet Ukraine as Western Ukraine, with the size of 88,000 km^{2} and population of 8,000,000. On the same day, at Rossa Cemetery in Wilno, a mass, patriotic demonstration takes place, with 20,000 people present
- November 2. The Germans officially change name of the Wawel Castle into Krakauer-Burg. First Poles, displaced from German-occupied western part of country, come to Warsaw
- November 3. German occupational authorities confiscate all radios. Hence, those Poles who keep their radios, are punished with death
- November 5. Mass expulsions of Poles from Poznań begin. They are replaced with Germans from the Baltic states
- November 6. Sonderaktion Krakau – arrest of 183 professors from Kraków
- November 7. In Reichsgau Wartheland, a ban on Polish-German marriages is announced
- November 8. Aleksandra Piłsudska, together with daughters Wanda Piłsudska and Jadwiga Piłsudska arrive in London,
- November 9. Mass arrests of Polish teachers in Łódź county. The city of Łódź, together with surrounding areas, is incorporated into Wartheland
- November 12. General Mieczysław Boruta-Spiechowicz leaves Lwów and tries to get to Hungary. Caught by the NKVD, he is arrested. On the same day, German authorities begin printing of German-language newspapers, Krakauer Zeitung (in Kraków) and Warschauer Zeitung (in Warsaw)
- November 14. Upon decree of the Supreme Soviet of the Soviet Union, northeastern part of Poland (see: Territories of Poland annexed by the Soviet Union) is incorporated into Soviet Belarus, as Western Belarus, with the size of 108,000 km^{2} and population of 4,800,000
- November 19. In Lwów, a group of Polish writers (Władysław Broniewski, Tadeusz Boy-Żeleński, Stanisław Jerzy Lec, Aleksander Wat and Adam Ważyk), together sign an article published in Czerwony Sztandar, in which they praise incorporation of southeastern Poland into the Soviet Union
- November 20. General Władysław Langner crosses former Polish–Romanian border
- November 21. Colonel Stanisław Sosabowski leaves Warsaw and heads for Budapest. On the same day, German authorities officially transfer Spisz and Orawa to Slovakia
- November 22. French government declares the town of Angers seat of Polish government-in-exile
- November 23. Upon decree of Hans Frank, all Jews over the age of 12 must wear armbands with the Star of David
- November 29. Upon decree of the Supreme Soviet, all inhabitants of the Soviet-occupied areas of Poland are granted Soviet citizenship

=== December ===
- December 3. President in Exile, Władysław Raczkiewicz, moves from Paris to Angers
- December 4. General Kazimierz Sosnkowski signs a Decree number 1 for Citizen Rakon (Rakon was nom de guerre of Stefan Rowecki), which contains text of oath of members of the Union of Armed Struggle
- December 5. A Theological college in Lwów is dissolved by Soviet authorities
- December 7. In Zakopane, NKVD and Gestapo officers discuss mutual cooperation and methods of fighting Polish resistance (see: Gestapo–NKVD Conferences). In Palmiry, the Germans execute 80 persons
- December 10. In Lwów, NKVD agents arrest around 800 officers of the Polish Army, including General Mariusz Zaruski. In Volhynia, resettlement of ethnic German population begins. The Germans move to Wartheland
- December 13. In Warsaw, Bolesław Piasecki is arrested
- December 15. Lithuanian government liquidates Polish-language University of Stefan Batory in Wilno, creating a Lithuanian-language Vilnius University
- December 23. In Lublin, the Germans execute 10 leaders of local Polish community
- December 24. In Eastern Poland, occupied by the Soviets, exchange of currency takes place. Polish złotys are replaced with the much less valued Rubles
- December 27. In Wawer, the Germans execute 106 Polish civilians

== Arts and literature ==
=== Awards ===
- January 17. Jerzy Andrzejewski is awarded the youth prize of the Polish Academy of Literature
- January 28. Leopold Staff receives an Honorary degree at the Warsaw University

=== New books ===
- Possessed by Witold Gombrowicz
- Nuta człowiecza, a poetry bundle by Józef Czechowicz

=== Film ===
- Sportowiec mimo woli, with Adolf Dymsza, directed by Mieczysław Krawicz, music by Henryk Wars, premiered on May 31 1940.
- Trzy serca, with Elżbieta Barszczewska and Aleksander Żabczyński, based on a book by Tadeusz Dołęga-Mostowicz, directed by Michał Waszyński, music by Zygmunt Wiehler, premiere March 17, 1939,
- Doktór Murek, with Nora Ney based on a book by Tadeusz Dołęga-Mostowicz, directed by Juliusz Gardan, music by Władysław Szpilman,
- Włóczęgi, a comedy directed by Michał Waszyński, music by Henryk Wars,
- U kresu drogi with Mieczysława Ćwiklińska and Kazimierz Junosza-Stępowski, screenplay by Anatol Stern, directed by Michał Waszyński.

== Sports ==
=== January ===
- January 8. A 20-year-old Polish glider Tadeusz Góra is awarded the Lilienthal Medal for his 577.8-kilometer glider flight from Bezmiechowa near Lesko to Soleczniki near Wilno
- January 10. In the Upper Silesian city of Beuthen, football team of Polish Upper Silesia loses 3–5 to the team of German Upper Silesia, with Leonard Piątek scoring two goals and Jerzy Wostal one
- January 11. Jadwiga Wajs, discus throw Olympic silver and bronze medalist gets married in Łódź
- January 15. In Warsaw, in an international boxing match, Poland beats the Netherlands 16-0
- January 16. In Stockholm, in an international boxing match, Poland beats Sweden 12-4
- January 22. In a football friendly in Paris, France beats Poland 4-0
- January 25. The national ice hockey team for the 1939 World Ice Hockey Championships in Switzerland has been announced. It consists of 15 players – 5 from Cracovia, 4 from Dąb Katowice, 4 from Warszawianka Warszawa, 1 from AZS Poznań and 1 from Czarni Lwów
- January 27. Men's volleyball championships of Poland begin in Lwów
- January 29. In Lwów, Sokol Drugi Lwów becomes men's volleyball champion of Poland. Second is Cresovia Grodno, third – CWS Warszawa

=== February ===
- February 4. In the 1939 World Ice Hockey Championships, Poland in Group C (Basel) beats the Netherlands 9-0
- February 5. In the 1939 World Ice Hockey Championships, Poland in Basel loses 0–4 to Canada
- February 7. In the second round of the 1939 World Ice Hockey Championships, Poland in Basel loses to Switzerland 0-4
- February 8. In the second round of the 1939 World Ice Hockey Championships, Poland in Basel beats Hungary 5-3
- February 9. In the second round of the 1939 World Ice Hockey Championships, Poland in Basel loses to the United States 0-4
- February 10. In the consolidation round of the 1939 World Ice Hockey Championships, Poland in Zürich beats Hungary 3-0
- February 11. Skiing championships of the world (FIS), begin in Zakopane
- February 12. In the consolidation round of the 1939 World Ice Hockey Championships, Poland in Zürich loses to Germany 0–4, finishing sixth overall
- February 12. In Poznań, in an international boxing match, Poland beats Hungary 14-2

=== March ===
- March 3. In Katowice, the team of Dąb Katowice becomes ice-hockey champion of Poland. Second is Warszawianka Warszawa, third Ognisko Wilno
- March 5. In Łódź, in an international table tennis game, Poland beats Latvia 5-4
- March 12. In Lwów, in an international boxing match, Poland beats Finland 14-2
- March 12. In Riga, in an international boxing match, Poland B beats Latvia 10-6
- March 19. In Poznań, in an international boxing match, Poland beats Italy 10-6
- March 26. In the first game of the 1939 season of the Polish football league, Garbarnia Kraków beats at home Ruch Chorzów 2-1 (att. 4000)

=== April ===
- April 2. Games of the 1939 season of the Polish football league begin. In the first round, Warszawianka Warszawa loses at home to Ruch Chorzów 0-5 (att. 3000), AKS Chorzów loses in Chorzów 1–2 to Cracovia (att. 6000), Pogoń Lwów beats at home Garbarnia Kraków 5-1 (att. 4000), Wisła Kraków beats at home Polonia Warszawa 2-1 (att. 3500) and Warta Poznań beats at home Union Touring Łódź 7-0 (att. 2000)
- April 10. During the Easter holidays, several foreign football teams came to Poland. Gedania Gdańsk, a Polish minority side from the Free City of Danzig, beat 3-1 Warszawianka Warszawa in Warsaw, Elektromos Budapest lost 1–2 to Wisła Kraków and beat 1-0 Cracovia Kraków, Kispest FC beat 2-1 AKS Chorzów and lost 1–2 to Ruch Chorzów, and SK Bratislava beat 2–1 in Lwów the reserve team of Pogoń Lwów
- April 13. Polish team leaves Poznań and goes by train to Dublin, to participate in the 1939 European Amateur Boxing Championships
- April 16. In the games of the Polish football league, Polonia Warszawa beats at home Warta Poznań 3-1 (att. 4000), Cracovia beats at home Warszawianka Warszawa 2-1 (att. 7000), Garbarnia Kraków loses at home 2–3 to AKS Chorzów (att. 7000), Ruch Chorzów beats at home Pogoń Lwów 4-1 (att. 4000) and Wisła Kraków beats in Łódź Union-Touring 3-1 (att. 3000). In Warsaw, in a table tennis international game, Kaunas beats Warsaw 7-2
- April 22. Polish boxing team, with one gold (Antoni Kolczyński), three silver medals (Antoni Czortek, Józef Pisarski, Franciszek Szymura) and a bronze by Zbigniew Kowalski, leaves Dublin, after the 1939 European Amateur Boxing Championships. Poland overall is the winner of team competition. In Riga, in a basketball international friendly, Poland loses to Latvia 18:42
- April 23. In the games of the Polish football league, Cracovia Kraków beats at home Union-Touring lodz 1-0 (att. 3000), Garbarnia Kraków beats away Warszawianka Warszawa 2-0 (att. 3000), Pogoń Lwów beats at home Polonia Warszawa 3-2 (att. 3000), Warta Poznań beats at home Wisła Kraków 4-1 and in the Upper Silesian classic, Ruch Chorzów beats on home turf AKS Chorzów 3–2, with attendance of 10,000. In Riga, in a basketball international friendly, Poland beats Latvia 31-29

=== May ===
- May 3. In Kraków, in the Polish Football League game, Wisła Kraków beats Pogoń Lwów 2-1 (att. 4000). In international tennis game, Poland beats Romania 3–1. In Warsaw and major Polish cities (Kraków, Lwów, Wilno, Poznań, Toruń, Gdynia, Białystok, Zakopane, Lublin, Brzesc, Grudziądz, Slonim), National Running Day competitions take place, with numerous athletes participating
- May 7. In games of the Polish Football League, Warszawianka Warszawa beats Polonia Warszawa 5-1 (att. 8000), Ruch Chorzów beats Garbarnia Kraków 5-0 (att. 5000), Wisła Kraków beats Cracovia Kraków 5-1 (att. 8000), Pogoń Lwów ties at home with Union-Touring Łódź 2-2 (att. 2000) and Warta Poznań beats at home AKS Chorzów 2-1 (att. 5000). In Warsaw, in the Davis Cup match, Poland beats the Netherlands 4-1
- May 14. In Warsaw, in an international football friendly, the team of the city of Warsaw beats the team of the city of Kaunas 5-2
- May 19. A Davis Cup game Poland-Germany begins
- May 21. In games of the Polish Football League, Warszawianka Warszawa loses at home 0–4 to AKS Chorzów (att. 3000), Ruch Chorzów routs at home Union-Touring Łódź 12-1 (with 10 goals by Ernest Wilimowski, att. 2000), Pogoń Lwów beats away Warta Poznań 1–0, and Wisła Kraków ties 1–1 with Garbarnia Kraków (att. 6000)
- May 22. In Kaunas, during the Basketball Championships of Europe, basketball team of Poland beats Estonia 40-36
- May 23. In Kaunas, basketball team of Poland beats France 38-36
- May 24. In Kaunas, basketball team of Poland loses to Lithuania 18-46
- May 25. In Kaunas, basketball team of Poland beats Hungary 42-20
- May 27. In Łódź, in a football friendly, Poland ties 3–3 with Belgium, with two goals by Ernst Wilimowski and one by Jerzy Wostal. On the same day in Lwów, events marking 35th anniversary of Pogoń Lwów take place
- May 28. Polish national basketball team finishes the EuroBasket 1939 on the third spot, behind Lithuania and Latvia

=== June ===
- June 4. In Warsaw, in a football friendly, Poland ties 1–1 with Switzerland, with a goal by Leonard Piątek
- June 8. In a game of the Polish Football League, Wisła Kraków loses at home 0–1 to Ruch Chorzów (att. 7000)
- June 11. In games of the Polish Football League, Warta Poznań beats at home Warszawianka Warszawa 4-2 (att. 3500), Garbarnia Kraków loses at home to Cracovia 1-2 (att. 4000), Polonia Warszawa routs at home Union-Touring Łódź 6-1 (att. 4000) and AKS Chorzów beats at home Pogoń Lwów 2-0 (att. 5000)
- June 18. In games of the Polish Football League, Pogoń Lwów beats at home Cracovia Kraków 3–0, Warta Poznań ties away with Ruch Chorzów 1-1 (att. 6000), Wisła Kraków beats in Warsaw Warszawianka Warszawa 1-0 (att. 2500), Garbarnia Kraków ties at home 2–2 with Polonia Warszawa (att. 2000) and AKS Chorzów beats in Łódź Union Touring 7-1 (att. 3000). On the same day, handball team of Poland beats Sweden in Katowice 8-6
- June 25. In an international women's track and field match in Bergamo, Poland loses to Italy 33–51. In games of the Polish Football League, Polonia Warszawa beats at home Wisła Kraków 5-4 (att. 6000), AKS Chorzów ties at home 0–0 with Warszawianka Warszawa (att. 2000), Cracovia Kraków loses at home 2–5 to Ruch Chorzów (att. 6000), Pogoń Lwów beats in Łódź Union-Touring 2-1 (att. 1500) and Warta Poznań beats at home Garbarnia Kraków 5-0 (att. 4000). In Łódź, ŁKS Łódź becomes man's handball champion of Poland. Second is Pogon Katowice, third AZS Warszawa, and fourth, AZS Lwów

=== July ===
- July 2. In the games of the Polish Football League, Ruch Chorzów loses at home 2–3 to Polonia Warszawa (att. 4000), Cracovia beats Warszawianka Warszawa in Warsaw 3-1 (att. 1500), Wisła Kraków routs at home Warta Poznań 5-0 (att. 3000), and Pogoń Lwów, in its last ever official home game, ties 1–1 with AKS Chorzów (att. 5000)
- July 8. Men's track and field championships of Poland begin in Poznań
- July 9. In Kraków, in the Polish Football League game, Garbarnia Kraków beats Union Touring Łódź 2-1 (att. 1000)
- July 15. Women's track and field championships of Poland begin in Katowice
- July 16. In the Polish Football League game, Polonia Warszawa ties 2–2 at home with Ruch Chorzów (att. 4000), on the same day women's swimming championships of Poland end in Bielsko-Biała
- July 22. Tour de Pologne begins with the first stage, from Warsaw to Lublin
- July 23. Second stage of Tour de Pologne, from Lublin, via Zamość and Rawa Ruska, to Lwów
- July 24. Third stage of Tour de Pologne, from Lwów, via Przeworsk to Rzeszów,
- July 25. Fourth stage of Tour de Pologne, from Rzeszów, via Tarnów to Kraków
- July 26. Fifth stage of Tour de Pologne, from Kraków, via Bielsko-Biała, to Cieszyn
- July 28. Sixth stage of Tour de Pologne, from Cieszyn, via Trzyniec, to Katowice
- July 29. Seventh stage of Tour de Pologne, from Katowice, via Częstochowa, to Piotrków Trybunalski
- July 30. Last, eighth, stage of Tour de Pologne, from Piotrków Trybunalski to Warsaw. Bolesław Napierała wins the tournament

=== August ===
- August 2. In Gdynia, Józef Hebda becomes tennis champion of Poland
- August 10. International tennis game Poland – China starts in Warsaw
- August 12. Rowing championships of Poland begin in Poznań
- August 13. In the Polish Football League qualifiers, Legia Poznań ties at home 1–1 with Junak Drohobycz and Śląsk Świętochłowice beats at home Śmigły Wilno 2-1
- August 15. In the Polish Football League game, Cracovia loses at home 3–4 to Pogoń Lwów (att. 4000)
- August 20. In the last prewar round of the Polish Football League, Polonia Warszawa beats at home Pogoń Lwów 2-1 (this is the last ever game in the history of the Lwów side, att. 5000), Cracovia beats 3–2 in Łódź the team of Union Touring Łódź (att. 3000), Warta Poznań beats at home Ruch Chorzów 5-2 (att. 8000), AKS Chorzów beats at home Garbarnia Kraków 3-0 (att. 3000) and Wisła Kraków beats at home Warszawianka Warszawa 4-2 (att. 3000). On the same day, in the qualifiers to the League, Śmigły Wilno beats at home Legia Poznań 5-1 (att. 3000), and Junak Drohobycz ties at home 0–0 with Śląsk Świętochłowice (att. 4000),
- August 25. For the first time in the interbellum period, a Polish football team, Śmigły Wilno, goes to Lithuania to play friendlies there,
- August 27. In Warsaw, Polish football team beats Hungary 4–2, with three goals scored by Ernest Willimowski and one by Leonard Piątek (see: 1939 Poland vs Hungary football match)

=== September ===
- September 3 – A planned international football friendly between Poland and Bulgaria in Warsaw was cancelled due to the invasion of Poland. On the same day, the Gordon Bennett cup in ballooning, planned in Lwów, was cancelled. Three other international matches were cancelled in September, between Poland and Yugoslavia in Belgrade on 6 September, and two matches on the 24 September between Poland B Team and Finland in Helsinki, and Poland A Team and Romania in Bucharest.

== Births ==
- February 2 – Marcin Libicki, conservative politician is born in Poznań,
- February 6 – Czesław Niemen, a singer and composer, is born in Stare Wasiliszki
- April 20 – Anna Radziwiłł, historian, educator, and politician,
- April 27 – Stanisław Dziwisz, a Cardinal of the Roman Catholic Church, is born in Raba Wyżna
- May 2 – Stanisław Ciosek, prominent member of the Polish United Workers' Party, is born in the village of Pawłowice near Radom
- May 12 – Aleksander Papiewski, football manager
- May 28 – Wojciech Karolak, jazz musician, born in Warsaw
- June 17 – Krzysztof Zanussi, producer and film director is born in Warsaw
- July 2 – Film actress Iga Cembrzyńska is born in Radom
- July 19 – Bohdan Cywiński, a writer and member of anticommunist movements, is born in Milanówek
- July 29 – Witold Baran, a middle-distance runner, is born in Chmielów near Kielce
- August 9 – Maria Czubaszek, a poet and songwriter, is born in Warsaw
- August 23 – Edward Linde-Lubaszenko, actor, born in Białystok
- September 19 – Jerzy Bartmiński, linguist and ethnologist, is born in Przemyśl
- September 23 – Janusz Gajos, an actor, is born in Dąbrowa Górnicza
- November 5 – Jan Nowicki, actor, born in Kowal
- December 14 – Włodzimierz Jakubowski, footballer, is born in Poznan
- December 29 – Konrad Fiałkowski, scientist, born in Lublin

== Deaths ==
- January 2. In the village of Drozdowo near Łomża, at 1:05 a.m., dies Roman Dmowski
- February 24. In Warsaw dies Tadeusz Puszczyński, commandant of the Wawelberg Group and the Sarny Fortified Area
- March 8. In Warsaw dies professor Władysław Marian Zawadzki, former Minister of Treasury
- April 2. Walery Sławek commits suicide
- May 24. Professor Aleksander Brückner dies in Berlin
- July 3. Football player Hubert Gad drowns in a pond in Świętochłowice
- August 17. Wojciech Korfanty dies in Warsaw
- September 9. Józef Czechowicz, avant garde poet, dies in Lublin
- September 10:
  - Władysław Raginis commits suicide at Wizna
  - Wilhelm Fritz von Roettig, German Waffen SS general becomes the first general killed in action during World War II
- September 18. Following Soviet invasion on Poland, Stanisław Ignacy Witkiewicz commits suicide in the Polesie Voivodeship
- September 20. Tadeusz Dołęga-Mostowicz dies in a skirmish with Soviet forces in Kuty
- September 22. General Józef Olszyna-Wilczyński is murdered by the Red Army soldiers
- September 24. Samuel Dickstein, mathematician (b. 1851)
- October 30. In Konstantynów dies Wacław Gąsiorowski, writer of popular historic novels
- December 14. Wacław Niemojowski, a monarchist politician, dies in Kalisz
- December 24. Professor Antoni Meyer dies in Sachsenhausen concentration camp
- December 28. Stanisław Estreicher dies in Sachsenhausen concentration camp
