= Pinsk (disambiguation) =

Pinsk is a city in Belarus. It may also refer to:

- Johannes Pinsk (1891–1957), German Roman-Catholic theologian and priest
- Pinsk Voblast, a former administrative subdivision of Belarus
- Pinsk Raion, an administrative subdivision of Belarus
- Roman Catholic Diocese of Pinsk, a diocese at Pinsk
- Pripet Marshes
- Pinsk Flotilla, see Riverine Flotilla of the Polish Navy
- Pinsk massacre in Pinsk in April 1919
- Ognisko Pińsk, a former Polish football team located at Pinsk
- FC Volna Pinsk, a football team located at Pinsk
- Pinsk (Hasidic dynasty), a family of rabbis from Pinsk and Karlin
- see also Pinsky, a surname meaning "from Pinsk"
