= Pinsky =

Jewish surnames

Pinsky is a Belarusian toponymic surname, and means someone from Pinsk in Belarus. When spelled Pinski; it is usually short form of the Polish and Ashkenazi Jewish surname Lapinski. It may refer to:

- Charles Pinsky, producer/director
- David Pinski (1872–1959), Yiddish-language writer
- Drew Pinsky (born 1958), American doctor, medical radio talk show host
- Ellis Pinsky, American student involved in a high-profile cryptocurrency theft
- Leo Pinsky (born 1926), American baseball player
- Mark Pinsky (born in 1940), mathematician.
  - the Pinsky phenomenon, his discovery
- Paul G. Pinsky, American politician
- Robert Pinsky (born 1940), American poet, essayist, literary critic, and translator
- Viktor Pinsky (born 1964), Russian politician
