= Józef Lipski =

Polish diplomat (1894–1958)

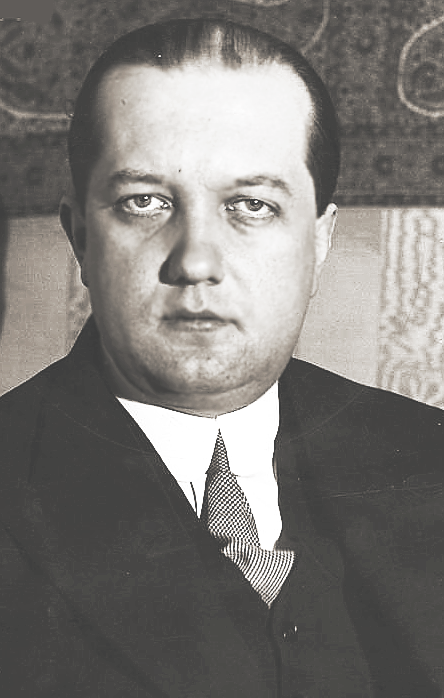
Józef Lipski (c. 1934)

Józef Lipski (5 June 1894 – 1 November 1958) was a Polish diplomat and Ambassador to Nazi Germany from 1934 to 1939. Lipski played a key role in the foreign policy of the Second Polish Republic.

== Life ==
Lipski trained as a lawyer, and joined the Polish Ministry of Foreign Affairs in 1925. From 29 October 1934 to 1 September 1939, Lipski served as the Polish ambassador to Germany. One of his first assignments in 1934 was to work on the German–Polish declaration of non-aggression, to try to secure the border to the east in light of Poland's isolation and the build-up in both Communist Russia and Germany itself.

In late 1938, German officials approached Poland with a suggestion to resettle European Jews to Africa, inspired by the British Uganda Scheme and the Franco-Polish Madagascar Plan, and Lipski as the Polish ambassador to Germany discussed the matter with Hitler. Yohanan Cohen describes Lipski's discussion with Hitler, which took place on 21 October 1938, as "characteristic of the kinds of things that had come to dominate the Polish establishment and public were comments by Jósef Lipski." Responding to Hitler's suggestions, Lipski said that "if he can find such a solution we will erect him a beautiful monument in Warsaw". Timothy Snyder stated that "historians of these negotiations often quote Lipski's remark that Poland would build a monument to Hitler if he found a way to resolve the Jewish question. With knowledge of the Holocaust we can find this remark even more revolting than it, in fact, was. Lipski was expressing the hope that despite the overwhelming difficulties, Germany could induce some maritime power to open some overseas colony to Polish Jews. It never occurred to him that Hitler's 'resolution' could be total mass murder."

On 24 October 1938, Lipski met with German Foreign Minister Joachim von Ribbentrop at Hitler's mountain retreat in Berchtesgaden. Ribbentrop demanded that Poland agree to the German annexation of the Free City of Danzig; Lipski refused. According to British historian A. J. P. Taylor, just days before the German invasion of Poland, Lipski refused to get out of bed, despite the urging of British diplomats, to meet with von Ribbentrop to hear Germany's latest demands of Poland, illustrating the Polish response to the aggressive German diplomacy. Under British pressure to negotiate a solution to the Danzig crisis, Lipski eventually phoned to ask for an interview with Ribbentrop on 31 August 1939 – the day before the invasion – but when learning that Lipski would only be present as an ambassador, rather than as a plenipotentiary, the meeting was refused. According to Taylor, the Germans were aware of Lipski's limited negotiating authority.

During the Second World War, Lipski fought as a volunteer (Polish 1st Grenadiers Division in France) and later joined the General Staff of the Polish Armed Forces in the West. In 1951 Lipski moved to the USA and represented the Polish Government in Exile.

== Statement by Vladimir Putin ==
In December 2019, during a speech given to high-ranking Russian defense officials, Russian President Vladimir Putin accused Lipski of antisemitism, calling him "That bastard! That anti-Semitic pig." The remarks were condemned by Polish government officials, and Poland's Chief Rabbi, Michael Schudrich, stated that "for us Jews, it is particularly outrageous for Putin to manipulate the tone of [Lipski's comments] made in his conversation with Adolf Hitler in 1938. One shouldn't forget Poland supported the emigration of its 10 percent Jewish minority, but it did so partly in cooperation with the Zionist movement, to which it gave clandestine military support. At the same time, however, when the Third Reich expelled thousands of Polish Jews in 1938, Polish diplomatic services, including Ambassador Lipski personally, assisted them. Accusing [Lipski] of antisemitism on the basis of one sentence taken out of context is extremely irresponsible."

Professor Mariusz Wołos stated that "[Lipski's] extensive legacy ... has no traces of antisemitic attitude. Lipski was not an antisemite."

== See also ==
- Polish corridor
- 1939 in Poland
- List of Poles
