= Longin Pawłowski =

Polish footballer

Personal information
- Date of birth: 2 April 1909
- Place of birth: Wilno, Russian Empire
- Date of death: 1 November 1983 (aged 74)
- Place of death: Toronto, Canada
- Height: 1.70 m (5 ft 7 in)
- Position: Forward

Senior career*
Years	Team	Apps	(Gls)
1924–1926	Strzelec Wilno		
1927–1939	Śmigły Wilno		

International career
1937	Poland	1	(0)
- * Club domestic league appearances and goals

Longin Pawłowski (2 April 1909 – 1 November 1983) was a Polish footballer who played as a forward.

He made one appearance for the Poland national team in 1937.
