= German–Polish declaration of non-aggression =

1934 international declaration

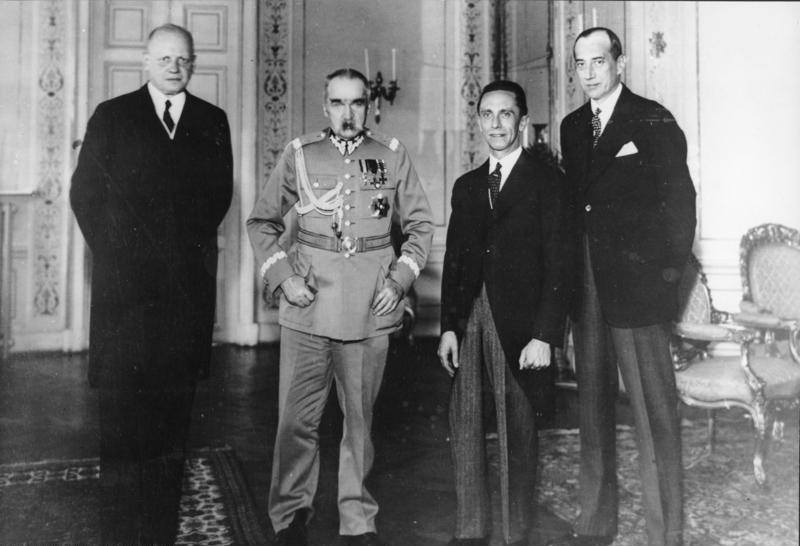
- German Ambassador Hans-Adolf von Moltke, Polish leader Józef Piłsudski, German Propaganda Minister Joseph Goebbels and Polish Foreign Minister Józef Beck meeting in Warsaw on 15 June 1934, five months after issuing the declaration.
- Signed: 26 January 1934
- Location: Berlin, Germany
- Expiry: 28 April 1939
- Signatories: Józef Lipski; Konstantin von Neurath
- Parties: Poland; Germany
- Languages: Polish, German

The German–Polish declaration of non-aggression, also known as the German–Polish non-aggression pact, was an agreement between Nazi Germany and the Second Polish Republic that was signed on 26 January 1934 in Berlin.

Both countries pledged to resolve their problems by bilateral negotiations and to forgo armed conflict for a period of 10 years. The agreement effectively normalised relations between Poland and Germany, which had been strained by border disputes arising from the territorial settlement in the Treaty of Versailles. The declaration marked an end to an economically damaging customs war between the two countries that had taken place over the previous decade.

== Background ==
In 1925, under the Locarno Treaties, it was agreed that France would never send forces into Germany outside of its own occupation zone in the Rhineland and that both Britain and Italy would guarantee the Franco-German border against any attempt to change it from either side. The purpose of the Locarno treaties was to make it impossible for France to occupy the Ruhr, as had happened in 1923. From the Polish perspective, the Locarno Treaties were a diplomatic disaster, as the United Kingdom and Italy refused to make the same guarantees for Germany's eastern border, and both would theoretically declare war on France if it moved French Army troops into Germany beyond the Rhineland. Under the terms of the Franco-Polish alliance of 1921, France was supposed to start an offensive from the Rhineland occupation zone into the north German plain if Germany should invade Poland, but the Locarno Treaties had effectively gutted the provisions of the alliance.

British Foreign Secretary Austen Chamberlain had pushed for the Locarno Treaties as a way for Germany to peacefully revise the Treaty of Versailles in Eastern Europe. Chamberlain believed that as long as Poland had a great power like France as its ally, it would never hand over the areas that Germany was claiming such as the Polish Corridor and Upper Silesia, but improved Franco-German relations would weaken the Franco-Polish alliance and force the Poles to yield to the force majeure of German power. From the early 1920s onward, British foreign policy aimed to revise aspects of the Treaty of Versailles in favor of the Reich, such as the eastern borders that the Treaty of Versailles had imposed on Germany, in exchange for German acceptance of the other aspects of the treaty that the British approved. The French had largely yielded to British demands for the Locarno Treaties, which was seen as a betrayal in Poland.

French Foreign Minister Aristide Briand carried out a foreign policy aimed at a rapprochement with Germany, which caused much alarm in Warsaw. As long as the Rhineland was occupied by the French Army, it served as a form of guarantee in case of Germany violating the Treaty of Versailles, and it also placed the French in a strong position to launch an offensive to the Ruhr and launch an offensive into the North German Plain. In 1928, Briand accepted the offer by German Foreign Minister Gustav Stresemann that France would end the occupation of the Rhineland five years early and pull out of the Rhineland by June 1930, instead of June 1935, as the Treaty of Versailles had stated. Briand's plans for an early end of the Rhineland occupation in exchange for better relations with the Reich were vehemently opposed by Polish diplomats, who wanted the French to stay in the Rhineland for the full length. The Poles did not expect the Germans to abide by the Treaty of Versailles, and it was believed that the end of the French occupation would soon lead the Rhineland to be remilitarised. In turn, the Germans constructing defensive works along the Franco-German border would allow them to focus their might entirely against Poland. Besides opposing the plans for an early end of the Rhineland occupation, the Polish leader Józef Piłsudski wanted France to strengthen its alliance with Poland and was much offended when Briand rejected the plans and considered good relations with Berlin as more important than with Warsaw.

It has been said that Piłsudski's reason for seeking the declaration with Germany was his concern over France's Maginot Line. Until 1929, French plans had called for a French offensive into the North German Plain, in conjunction with offensives from Poland and Czechoslovakia. The construction of the Maginot Line, which began in 1929, indicated the French Army's preference for a strictly-defensive stance, which would leave its eastern allies on their own. From Piłsudski's viewpoint, in the light of France's military plans, a non-aggression declaration with Germany would be the best choice for Poland.

One of the most noted of Piłsudski's foreign policies was his rumoured proposal to France to declare war on Germany after Adolf Hitler had come to power in January 1933. Some historians speculate that Piłsudski may have sounded out France on the possibility of joint military action against Germany, which had been openly rearming in violation of the Treaty of Versailles. The French refusal might have been one of the reasons that Poland signed the non-aggression declaration. However, the argument that the declaration had been forced by French refusal to wage a "preventive war" has been disputed by historians, who point out that there is no evidence in French or Polish diplomatic archives that such a proposal was ever advanced. Under the terms of the Locarno Treaties, if France invaded Germany, both the Italians and the British would have required to declared war on France. Historians noted that when in late October 1933, rumours of a Polish "preventive-war" proposal were reported in Paris, their source was the Polish embassy, which had informed French reporters that Poland had proposed a "preventive war" to France and Belgium, but Poland and Germany had already been secretly negotiating. It has been argued that Piłsudski had the Polish embassy start rumours about a "preventive war" to pressure the Germans, who were demanding for Poland to end the 1921 Franco-Polish alliance. The declaration would specifically exclude that alliance.

== Negotiations ==
A détente began between Poland and Germany in early 1933. That was promoted by Józef Beck making what Hans-Adolf von Moltke interpreted as "a veiled proposal for direct contact with Germany" in April 1933. Hitler encouraged that by stating on 2 May 1933 by saying to Alfred Wysocki that he did not "share the view that questions Poland's right to exist" and then on 17 May in a speech to the Reichstag that he did not believe it to be possible to "make Germans out of Poles". That was followed by a lessening of tensions around Danzig in July 1933, with Piłsudski instructing Beck to explore options for further talks. In September, talks were held between Beck on the Polish side and Konstantin von Neurath and Joseph Goebbels on the German side, as part of the general conference on disarmament in Geneva.

The German-Polish rapprochement was temporarily interrupted by the German withdrawal from the Geneva disarmament talks in October 1933. However, by the next month, the Polish ambassador in Berlin had already asked Hitler whether the loss of security caused to Poland by Germany's exit from the talks might be compensated by "direct German-Polish relations". Hitler responded by stating that he saw Poland as "an outpost against Asia" and proposed a declaration excluding the possibility of war between the two countries. The Germans proposed a draft declaration to that effect, which was accepted in principle by the Polish government, and after a month, the talks on the text of the agreement were quickly concluded in January 1934.

== Declaration ==
=== Naming ===
The German foreign ministry insisted that the agreement be called a "declaration". rather than a "pact", which was seen as implying that there was no conflict of interest between the parties. Additionally, the Germans believed that it "might imply recognition of the German-Polish border. Despite this the agreement is still referred to as a "pact" in some documents.

=== Effect of the declaration ===
"The German Government and the Polish Government consider that the time has come to introduce a new phase in the political relations between Germany and Poland by a direct understanding between State and State. They have, therefore, decided to lay down the principles for the future development of these relations in the present declaration."

— English translation of opening of declaration

Under the declaration, Poland and Germany agreed to normalise relations. Until then, Germany had withheld normalisation without first settling the question of the German-Polish border. Instead, the issue of the border, particularly of the Danzig Corridor was put to one side, and both sides agreed not to use force to settle their dispute. The agreement also included clauses guarding Poland's relations with France under the Franco-Polish alliance, and under their membership of the League of Nations.

An additional benefit that Poland received from the declaration was that it enabled Beck to have a line of direct communication with Berlin regarding developments in the Free City of Danzig. That allowed Beck to avoid having to communicate directly with the League of Nations regarding the city, which was then governed by the League of Nations High Commissioner Seán Lester. Poland extracted a promise by Germany to accept a quota of Polish coal during the negotiation of the agreement.

For Germany, the agreement was the first major agreement reached during the Nazi era and gave Hitler an agreement that he could present domestically as a diplomatic success and internationally as a sign of his pacific intent. According to the historian Gerhard Weinberg, it also helped signal a weakening in the French-led alliances surrounding Germany, particularly by the secrecy in which it had been negotiated.

== Aftermath ==
=== International reactions ===
The British government was generally pleased by the German-Polish declaration and believed that it removed a dangerous threat to peace.

In Czechoslovakia, the agreement angered the political elite. The announcement of the declaration came just four days after discussions between Józef Beck and Czechoslovak Foreign Minister Edvard Beneš, who speaking to Joseph Addison, the British ambassador in Prague, claimed that the agreement was a "stab in the back" and went on to say that it showed that Poland was a "useless country" that deserved another partition. Beneš was particularly angered by reports in the government-controlled and right-wing press in Poland accusing the Czechs of mistreating Poles in the Trans-Olza region and the perceived Polish encouragement of Slovak nationalism.

The conclusion of the declaration led to accusations from France that its government had not been kept fully advised of the progress of negotiations between Poland and Germany. The French government had been kept informed of progress during the preliminary phase of the talks in late 1933, but that had not been kept up during the later part of the talks though the French were given a detailed explanation of the agreement and its motives by the Polish government soon after it had been signed. French public opinion about the agreement was negative. French critics of the deal believed it indicated that Poland might be an unreliable ally.

The signing of the treaty came as a surprise to the United States government despite the administration's previous advocacy of a Polish-German agreement. Some sections of American public opinion also saw the agreement as signalling Polish support for Germany.

Similarly, the signing of the agreement caused concern in the Soviet Union, with commentary in Izvestia questioning whether the agreement represented a concession by Germany or was simply a German manoeuvre and expressing the belief that the agreement was merely temporary. To allay any fears of a war against the Soviet Union, on 5 May 1934, Poland renewed the Soviet–Polish Non-Aggression Pact, which had been first signed on 25 July 1932. It was extended until 31 December 1945 despite Hitler's repeated suggestion to form a German-Polish alliance against the Soviets. A report on the declaration by the Soviet ambassador in Warsaw, Vladimir Antonov-Ovseenko, pointed out that the agreement contained no secret terms.

=== German denunciation ===
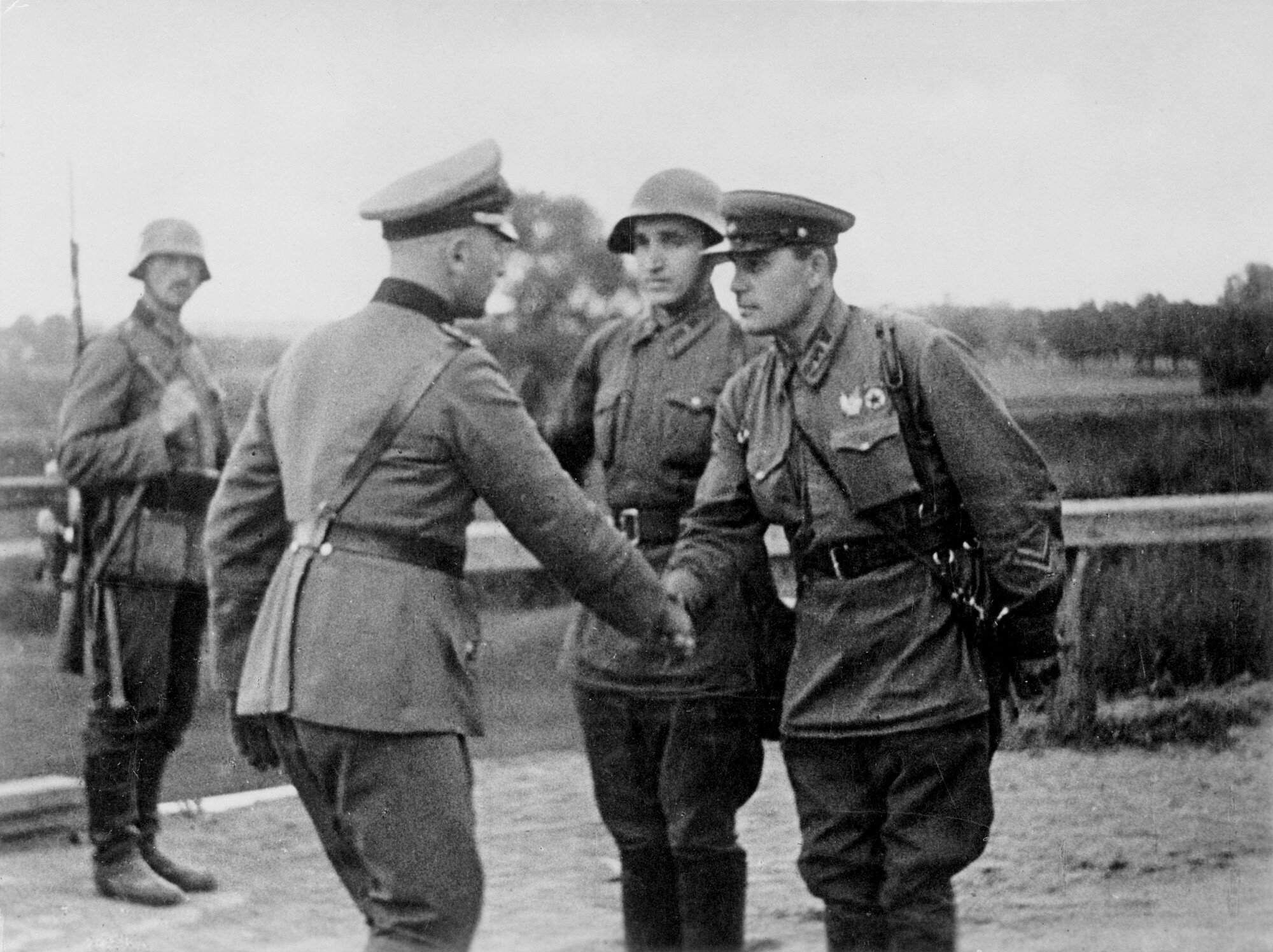
German and Soviet officers shaking hands following the invasion

German policy changed drastically in late 1938, after the annexation of Sudetenland sealed the fate of Czechoslovakia, and Poland became Hitler's next target. In October 1938, German Foreign Minister Joachim von Ribbentrop presented Poland with the proposition of renewing the agreement in exchange for allowing the Free City of Danzig to be annexed by Germany and the construction of an extraterritorial motorway and railway through the Polish Corridor, with Germany accepting Poland's postwar borders. Ribbentrop's offer also required Poland to join the Anti-Comintern Pact. Beck communicated the Polish government's unofficial refusal of the offer in a meeting with Hitler and Ribbentrop at Berchtesgaden on 4 January 1939, and the offer was formally rejected in a meeting of the Polish cabinet on 8 January 1939 though the formal and final rejection was not communicated to Germany until 25 March.

Hitler denounced the declaration unilaterally on 28 April 1939 during an address before the Reichstag and renewed German territorial claims in Poland. A note to Poland from the German government on 28 April 1939 expressed the view that the denunciation had been justified by the signing of the Anglo-Polish alliance. The signing of the alliance prompted Hitler to seek a rapprochement with Moscow, an offer that was positively received by the Soviet Union. After another few months of rising tension and the signature of the Molotov–Ribbentrop Pact between Germany and the Soviet Union, which contained a secret protocol by which Hitler and Stalin agreed to divide Poland between them, Germany invaded Poland on 1 September 1939, which initiated the Second World War, and the Soviets soon invaded Poland, on 17 September 1939.

== Legacy ==
=== Historiography ===
The historical significance of the agreement has been a matter of controversy. The British historian Hugh Seton-Watson, writing in 1945, stated that the 1934 declaration "marked the beginning of German-Polish active cooperation in an aggressive policy in Eastern Europe". Similarly, A. J. P. Taylor, in his 1961 book The Origins of the Second World War, considered that the declaration had removed the possibility of Polish support for France and freed Hitler to take further actions.

Later historians have been less critical of the agreement. The Polish-American historian Anna Cienciala wrote in 1975 that the agreement, together with the Polish-Soviet non-aggression pact, formed a "policy of equilibrium" of Poland's leadership seeking to preserve Poland's independence by balancing its relations with Germany and the Soviet Union and thus coming under the control of neither; she pointed to Piłsudski's refusal on multiple occasions to ally with Germany against the Soviet Union as evidence. Another Polish-American historian, Piotr S. Wandycz, wrote in 1986 criticism of Taylor as giving insufficient weight to the assurances the declaration gave regarding Poland's alliance with France and not taking into account that both Beck and Piłsudski were aware that the agreement would not hold for long. Wandycz also noted that Taylor had not had the advantage of seeing later-published material in which Piłsudski had expressed his view on the declaration to close associates.

=== Russian conspiracy theories ===
On 1 September 2009, on the 70th anniversary of the beginning of the Second World War, Russia's foreign intelligence agency, the SVR, declassified documents it said were gathered by undercover agents between 1935 and 1945 allegedly showing that Poland had secretly conspired with Germany against the Soviet Union. The SVR claimed that Poland had pursued an anti-Soviet foreign policy from the mid-1930s. The documents were compiled by a former senior KGB officer, who cited a report from an unidentified Soviet agent purporting that in 1934, Poland and Germany had agreed a secret protocol whereby Poland would remain neutral if Germany attacked the Soviet Union. In response, Polish historians said that there was no evidence that the protocol existed. Mariusz Wolos, an academic at the Polish Academy of Sciences stated, "Nothing similar has ever turned up in archives in Germany. Just because some agent wrote it doesn't mean it's true".

In his 2024 interview with Tucker Carlson, Russian President Vladimir Putin made reference to the conspiracy theory that Poland had "collaborated with Hitler" by signing the declaration. The historian and professor emerita at the London School of Economics Anita J. Prazmowska stated in an interview with the BBC, "The accusation that the Poles were collaborating is nonsense". She also noted that the Soviets had signed their own pact with Germany.

== Sources ==
- Wandycz, Piotr Stean (2001) [1988]. The Twilight of French Eastern Alliances. 1926–1936. French-Czechoslovak-Polish relations from Locarno to the remilitarization of the Rheinland. Princeton University Press. ISBN 1-59740-055-6..
- Wandycz, Piotr (2011). "Poland and the Origins of the Second World War". In Frank McDonough (ed.). The Origins of the Second World War. London: Continuum. pp. 374–393.
- Anna M. Cienciala, "The Foreign Policy of Józef Piłsudski and Józef Beck, 1926–1939: Misconceptions and Interpretations," The Polish Review (2011) 56#1 pp. 111–151 JSTOR 41549951
- Cienciala, Anna (1999). "The Munich Crisis, 1938". In Igor Lukes and Erik Goldstein (ed.). The Munich crisis of 1938: Plans and Strategy in Warsaw in the context of Wester appeasement of Germany. London: Frank Cass.
- Schuker, Stephan (1999). "The End of Versailles". In Gordon Martel (ed.). The Origins of the Second World War Reconsidered A.J.P. Taylor And The Historians. London: Routledge.
- "Text of German-Polish Agreement of January 26, 1934", The British War Bluebook – via Avalon Project
