= Mirków =

Mirków may refer to the following places in Poland:

- Mirków, Lower Silesian Voivodeship (south-west Poland)
- Mirków, Łódź Voivodeship (central Poland)
