= Mark Pinsky =

American mathematician (1940 – 2016)

- Born: July 15, 1940
- Died: December 8, 2016 (aged 76)
- Known for: Pinsky phenomenon

Academic background
- Education: MIT

Academic work
- Discipline: Mathematics
- Sub-discipline: Probability theory; Stochastic processes; Harmonic analysis
- Institutions: Northwestern University

Mark A. Pinsky (July 15, 1940 – December 8, 2016) was Professor of Mathematics at Northwestern University in Evanston, Illinois, United States. He studied probability theory, stochastic processes, and harmonic analysis.

His published works include 125 research papers and ten books, including several conference proceedings and textbooks. His 2002 book, Introduction to Fourier Analysis and Wavelets, has been translated into Spanish.

== Biography ==
Pinsky was at Northwestern beginning in 1968, following a two-year postdoctoral position at Stanford. He completed the Ph.D. at the Massachusetts Institute of Technology (MIT) in 1966, under the direction of Henry McKean and became Full Professor in 1976. He was married to the artist Joanna Pinsky since 1963; they have three children, Seth, Jonathan and Lea, and four grandchildren, Nathan, Jason, Justin and Jasper.

== Academic memberships and services ==
Pinsky was a member of the American Mathematical Society (AMS), a fellow of the Institute of Mathematical Statistics, Mathematical Association of America, and has provided services for Mathematical Sciences Research Institute (MSRI), most recently as Consulting Editor for the AMS. He served on the Executive Committee of MSRI for the period 1996–2000.

Pinsky was an invited speaker at the meeting to honor Stanley Zietz in Philadelphia at University of the Sciences in Philadelphia, on 20 March 2008.

Pinsky was a Fellow of the Institute of Mathematical Statistics and member of the Editorial Board of Journal of Theoretical Probability.

== Mathematical works ==
His early work was directed toward generalizations of the central limit theorem, known as random evolution, on which he wrote a monograph in 1991. At the same time he became interested in differential equations with noise, computing the Lyapunov exponents of various stochastic differential equations. His many interests include classical harmonic analysis and stochastic Riemannian geometry. The Pinsky phenomenon, a term coined by J.P. Kahane, has become a popular topic for research in harmonic analysis.

Pinsky was coordinator of the twenty-ninth Midwest Probability Colloquium, held at Northwestern University in October 2007.

In 2008, the Department of Mathematics at Northwestern University received a private donation from Mark and Joanna Pinsky to endow an annual lecture series.

== Selected publications ==
- Introduction to Fourier Analysis and Wavelets (Brooks/Cole Series in Advanced Mathematics), 2002, ISBN 978-0-534-37660-4
- Fourier series of radial functions in several variables
- Pointwise Fourier inversion and related eigenfunction expansions
- Eigenfunction expansions with general boundary conditions
- Pointwise Fourier Inversion-A Wave Equation Approach
- A generalized Kolmogorov for the Hilbert transform

See list of publication with pdfs.
