= Legia Poznań =

Polish football club

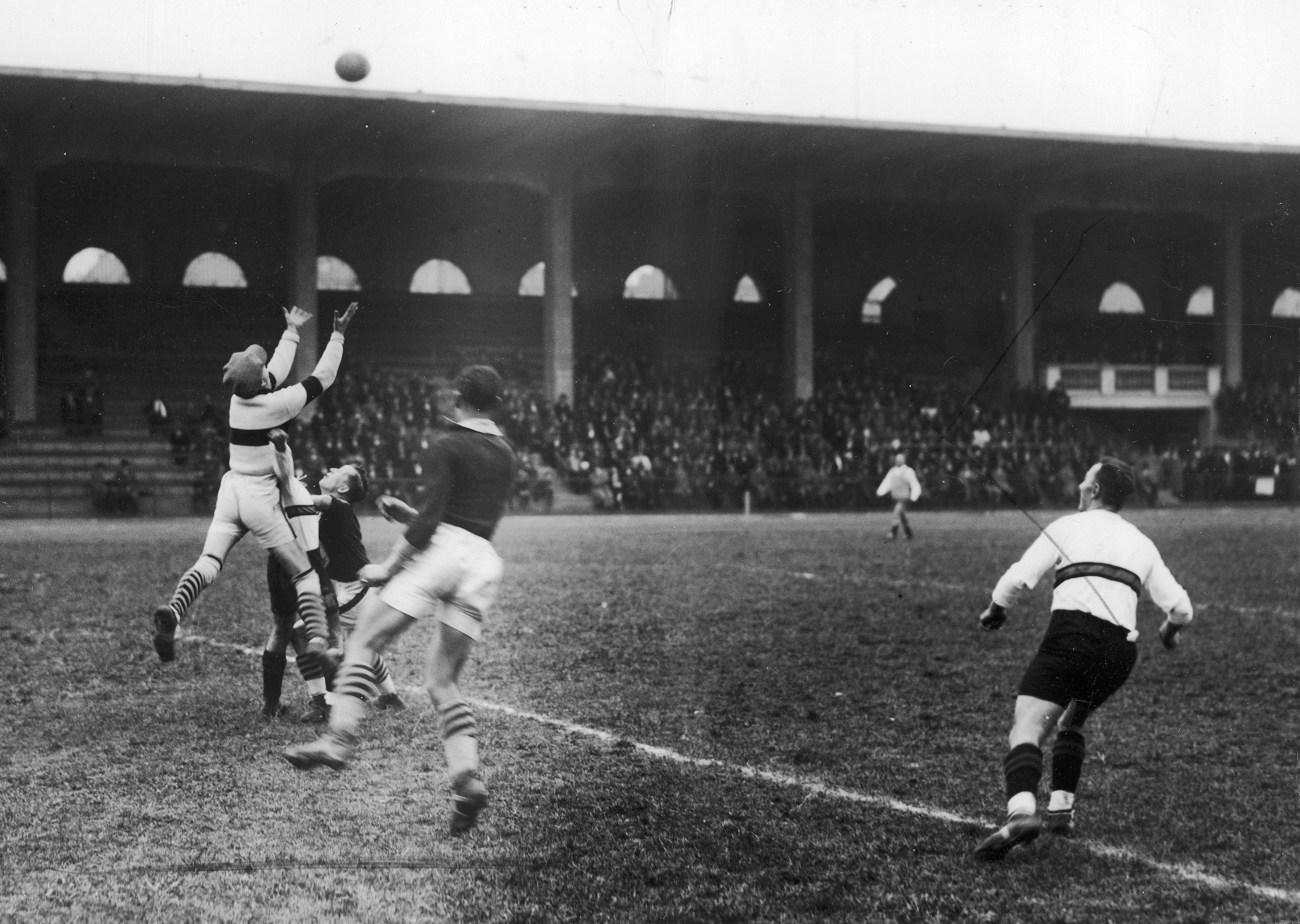
Home match with Śmigły Wilno in 1934

Legia Poznań (full name Klub Sportowy Legia Poznań) is a defunct Polish football club from Poznań. Founded in 1922, Legia was the second strongest team in the city of Poznań, behind Warta Poznań. Its team was nine times champion of Poznan's A-Class Regional League (see: Lower Level Football Leagues in Interwar Poland) - in 1927, 1929, 1930, 1931, 1932, 1933, 1934, 1934–1935, 1937–1938 and in 1938–1939. Despite these successes, Legia never managed to win promotion to the Ekstraklasa. It was closest in the 1939 qualifying games, when it faced three opponents - Śląsk Świętochłowice, Junak Drohobycz and Śmigły Wilno. However, the outbreak of World War II cut these games.

After the war, the new Soviet-installed communist government of Poland did not favor prewar teams, and Legia, as well as Warta, were sidelined, and replaced as the city's dominant team with Lech Poznań. Legia Poznań ceased to exist in 1949.
