= Zbigniew Kowalski =

Polish footballer

Personal information
- Full name: Zbigniew Kowalski
- Date of birth: 10 December 1970 (age 55)
- Place of birth: Świecie, Poland
- Height: 1.86 m (6 ft 1 in)
- Position: Centre-back

Senior career*
Years	Team	Apps	(Gls)
1993	ŁKS Łomża		
1993–1996	Jagiellonia Białystok		
1996–2000	Górnik Łęczna		
2001–2002	KSZO Ostrowiec		
2003–2007	ŁKS Łomża		
2007–2011	Znicz Pruszków	81	(0)
- * Club domestic league appearances and goals

Zbigniew Kowalski (born 10 December 1970) is a Polish former professional footballer who played as a defender.
