= Anna M. Cienciala =

Polish-American historian and author

- Born: November 8, 1929; Free City of Danzig
- Died: December 24, 2014 (aged 85); Ft. Lauderdale, Florida

Academic work
- Main interests: Eastern-European history
- Notable works: A Crime without Punishment

Anna Maria Cienciala (November 8, 1929 – December 24, 2014) was a Polish-American historian and author. She specialized in modern Polish and Russian history. Graduating with a history doctorate in 1962, she taught at two Canadian universities for a few years before joining the history faculty at the University of Kansas in 1965. She retired in 2002.

== Biography ==
Anna Cienciala was born in the Free City of Danzig (now Gdańsk, Poland) on November 8, 1929. She was educated in Poland and France. Cienciala received a Bachelor of Arts from Liverpool University in 1952, a Master of Arts from McGill University in 1955, and a Ph.D. from Indiana University at Bloomington in 1962, where she wrote her dissertation under the supervision of Piotr S. Wandycz.

She taught courses in Eastern European history, with a focus on modern Polish and Russian history, at the University of Ottawa and the University of Toronto in Canada, before landing a long-term career in the U.S. at the University of Kansas in 1965. As an author, Cienciala published two books, edited four books and wrote around forty academic articles in various American, German, and Polish historical journals. She retired as Professor Emeritus in June, 2002. In 2007 Cienciala published, together with two other historians, A Crime without Punishment, which explores the historiography of the Katyn massacre.

Cienciala was a member of a number of professional associations in Poland, the United Kingdom, and the United States. She received awards from the NEH, Fulbright, IREX, ACLS and the Hall Center at K.U. She was a member of the board of directors of the Polish Institute of Arts and Sciences of America, and received the Polish Cross of Merit. Recipient of the Union of Polish Writers Abroad award (London, 2012). A book published in 2000 by Gdańsk University and edited by Marek Andrzejewski was dedicated to her honor.

Cienciala died on December 24, 2014, in Ft. Lauderdale, Florida.

== Selected works ==
- Anna M. Cienciala, Poland and the Western Powers, 1938–1939. A Study in the Interdependence of Eastern and Western Europe, London, Toronto, 1968 online
- Anna M. Cienciala and Titus Komarnicki, From Versailles to Locarno, Keys to Polish Foreign Policy, 1919–1925, Lawrence, KS, 1984 online
- Anna M. Cienciala, The Battle of Danzig and the Polish Corridor at the Paris Peace Conference of 1919, ch. 5, in: Paul Latawski, ed., THE RECONSTRUCTION OF POLAND, 1914-23, Basingstoke, London, UK, 1992
- Anna M. Cienciala, Wilsonian East Central Europe: The British View with Reference to Poland, in: John S. Micgiel, ed., Wilsonian East Central Europe. Current Perspectives, New York, 1995
- Anna M. Cienciala, "The Foreign Policy of the Polish Government-in-Exile, 1939–1945: Political and Military Realities versus Polish Psychological Reality" in: John S. Micgiel and Piotr S. Wandycz eds., Reflections on Polish Foreign Policy, New York: 2005. online
- Anna M. Cienciala, Natalia S. Lebedeva, Wojciech Materski, Katyn: A Crime Without Punishment, Yale University Press, 2007, ISBN 0-300-10851-6
- Anna M. Cienciala, "The Foreign Policy of Józef Piłsudski and Józef Beck, 1926-1939: Misconceptions and Interpretations," The Polish Review (2011) 56#1 pp. 111–151 in JSTOR

== Bibliography ==
- Michał Kozłowski, Anna Maria Cienciała (8 XI 1929-24 XII 2014), "Rocznik Instytutu Europy Środkowo-Wschodniej" 13 (2015), no 1, p. 267-270 .
- Mieczysław Nurek, Anna Maria Cienciała jako świadek i badacz dziejów najnowszych [in:] Gdańsk - Gdynia - Europa - Stany Zjednoczone w XIX i XX wieku. Księga pamiątkowa dedykowana profesor Annie Cienciale, pod red. Marka Andrzejewskiego, Gdańsk 2000, p. 10-17.
- Jacek Tebinka, Bibliografia prac Anny Cienciały za lata 1953-2000 [in:] Gdańsk - Gdynia - Europa - Stany Zjednoczone w XIX i XX wieku. Księga pamiątkowa dedykowana profesor Annie Cienciale, pod red. Marka Andrzejewskiego, Gdańsk 2000, p. 18-38.
- Piotr Semków, Operacja "Stypendystka". Służba bezpieczeństwa a kwerenda archiwalna Profesor Anny Cienciały w Gdańsku, "Niepodległość" 53/54 (2002/2003), p. 317-323.
