= Pinsky phenomenon =

Non-convergence in Fourier analysis

In mathematics, the Pinsky phenomenon is a result in Fourier analysis. This phenomenon was discovered by Mark Pinsky of Northwestern University. It involves the spherical inversion of the Fourier transform. The phenomenon involves a lack of convergence at a point due to a discontinuity at boundary. This lack of convergence in the Pinsky phenomenon happens far away from the boundary of the discontinuity, rather than at the discontinuity itself seen in the Gibbs phenomenon. This non-local phenomenon is caused by a lensing effect.

== Prototypical example ==
Let a function g(x) = 1 for |x| < c in 3 dimensions, with g(x) = 0 elsewhere. The jump at |x| = c will cause an oscillatory behavior of the spherical partial sums, which prevents convergence at the center of the ball as well as the possibility of Fourier inversion at x = 0. Stated differently, spherical partial sums of a Fourier integral of the indicator function of a ball are divergent at the center of the ball but convergent elsewhere to the desired indicator function. This prototype example was coined the ”Pinsky phenomenon” by Jean-Pierre Kahane, CRAS, 1995.

== Generalizations ==
This prototype example can be suitably generalized to Fourier integral expansions in higher dimensions, both in Euclidean space and other non-compact rank-one symmetric spaces. Also related are eigenfunction expansions on a geodesic ball in a rank-one symmetric space, but one must consider boundary conditions. Pinsky and others also represent some results on the asymptotic behavior of the Fejér approximation in one dimension, inspired by work of Bump, Persi Diaconis, and J. B. Keller.
