= Kresy Tarnopol =

Polish sports club

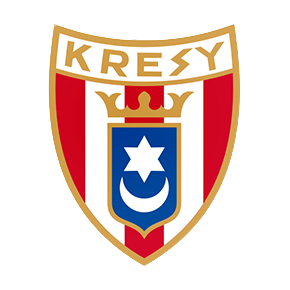
- Full name: Wojskowo-Cywilny Klub Sportowy Kresy Tarnopol
- Founded: 1907
- Dissolved: 1939
- Owner: Polish Army
- Chairmen: Dr. Aleksander Medyński (1907–1913); Dr. Włodzimierz Lenkiewicz (1921–1927) sgt. Władysław Langner (1928–1929) sgt. Wacław Piekarski (1930–1937)

WCKS Kresy Tarnopol is a defunct Polish multi-sports club, which was located in Tarnopol, then in southeastern Poland; currently Ternopil, Ukraine.

They had a football department which participated in regional leagues of the local Polish Football Association branch.

Kresy as a region and therefore the club too ceased to exist in September 1939, after German and Soviet aggression against Poland.
