= Śląsk Świętochłowice =

Polish football and speedway club

- Full name: Miejski Klub Sportowy; Śląsk Świętochłowice
- Nicknames: Niebiescy (The Blues); Skałka (The Little Rock)
- Founded: 1920; 105 years ago
- Ground: Skałka Stadium
- Capacity: 26,000
- Chairman: Damian Malujda
- Manager: Arkadiusz Spiolek
- League: V liga Silesia I
- 2024–25: V liga Silesia I, 6th of 16
Home colours	Away colours

Śląsk Świętochłowice (full name: Miejski Klub Sportowy Śląsk Świętochłowice) is a Polish sports club based in Świętochłowice, Upper Silesia, known for its motorcycle speedway and football teams.

== Name ==
Its name comes from the region of Silesia (Polish: Śląsk), in which it is located. Its full name Miejski Klub Sportowy Śląsk Świętochłowice means Silesia Świętochłowice City Sports Club.

== Football section ==
=== History ===
The club was founded in February 1920, during the hectic months of the post-World War I period, when the Allied Powers were hesitating about the future fate of the industrial region of Upper Silesia. Śląsk's first, historic game occurred on 21 March 1920 against Polonia Bytom (2–1).

In 1921, when it turned out that Świętochłowice and surrounding areas would belong to reborn independent Poland, Śląsk's football team was strengthened by several players of a German-minority team SV 1913. This was a huge boost, and after a few years, in late 1927, Świętochłowice's side was promoted to the Polish top division. To get there, Śląsk won qualifiers against the teams of Garbarnia Kraków, ŁTSG Łódź and WKS 6 Pułk Lotniczy Lwów.

The 1928 season was a failure. Out of 15 teams, Śląsk was placed on 14th position, with only 12 points (5 victories, 2 ties, goals 29–86). Relegation meant playing in Silesian A-Class, the strongest regional league in Poland. Relegation was not regarded by club's officials as a tragedy. Śląsk was a poor team, and playing in the National League was very expensive. Club simply had no money to travel to Lwów, Poznań or Toruń.

After a few years, in mid-1934, Śląsk won the Silesian League games. Then, in regional qualifiers it beat Unia Sosnowiec and Grzegorzecki Kraków. Final stage was a central tournament. There, after beating Śmigły Wilno, 5–1 and 2–0, as well as Naprzód Lipiny, 0–0 and 2–1, Śląsk was promoted to the Polish top division.

The 1935 season was a good one. Świętochłowice's side was placed on 5th position (among 11 teams), with 22 points and goals difference 34–40. Śląsk was the team of its own turf, at home winning for 8 times and losing twice. Next, 1936 season was much worse. Śląsk was placed on 9th (last but one) position which meant relegation (only 11 points, goals 21–40). Świętochłowice's favorites financial situation was much better than in 1928. Club was sponsored by "Florian" steelworks, its best players were Hubert Gad and Ewald Cebula, who also represented Poland.

In mid-1938 Śląsk won the Silesian League as well as regional qualifiers (against Legia Poznań and Gryf Toruń). However, in a national competition, the team was 3rd, after Garbarnia Kraków and Union Touring Łódź and ahead of Policyjny KS Łuck.

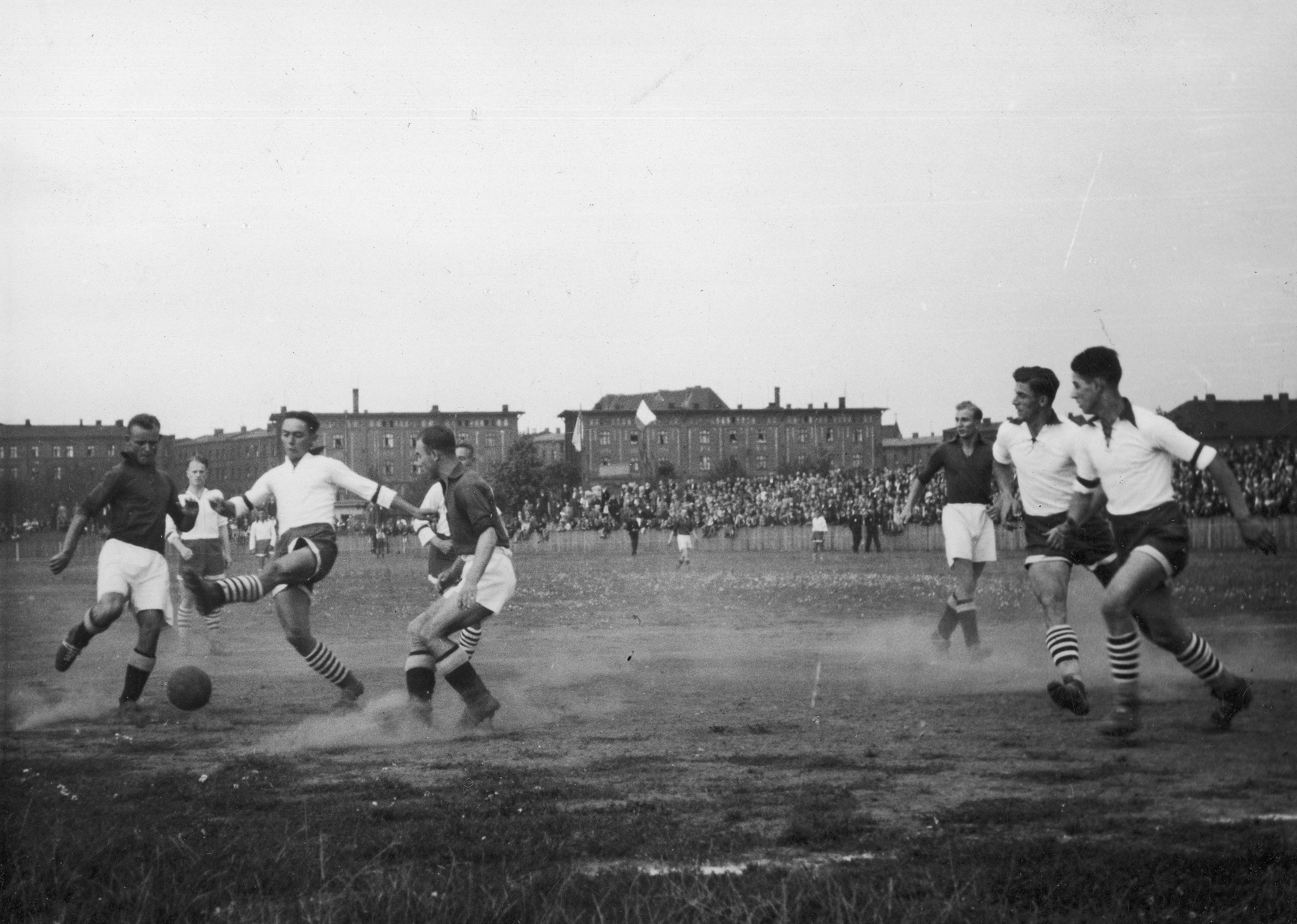
Home match with Śmigły Wilno in 1939

Next year was again marked by high hopes. Świętochłowice's favorites, looking stronger than ever before, won the Silesian League (mid-1939), then routed the teams of Fablok Chrzanów, 4–0 and 1–1, and Unia Sosnowiec 4–0 and 2–0, to qualify to the national qualifying tournament. This competition was not finished due to the German invasion of Poland, which started the Second World War. In August 1939 Śląsk managed to play only two games—at home with Śmigły Wilno (2–1) and away with Junak Drohobycz (0–0).

During the war, the German occupiers allowed those Silesians who signed the Volksliste to participate in the games of the Gauliga Schlesien, later the Gauliga Oberschlesien. Śląsk, with its name changed to TuS Schwientochlowitz, was basically the same team as in 1939, plus Walter Brom, a very talented goalkeeper of Ruch Chorzów. However, as time went by, more and more players were conscripted to the Wehrmacht, among them Ewald Cebula, who ended up in German units in Italy.

After the war, in spite of the dedication of its activists, Śląsk's football team never managed to return to the Polish top division.

== Speedway section ==
=== History ===
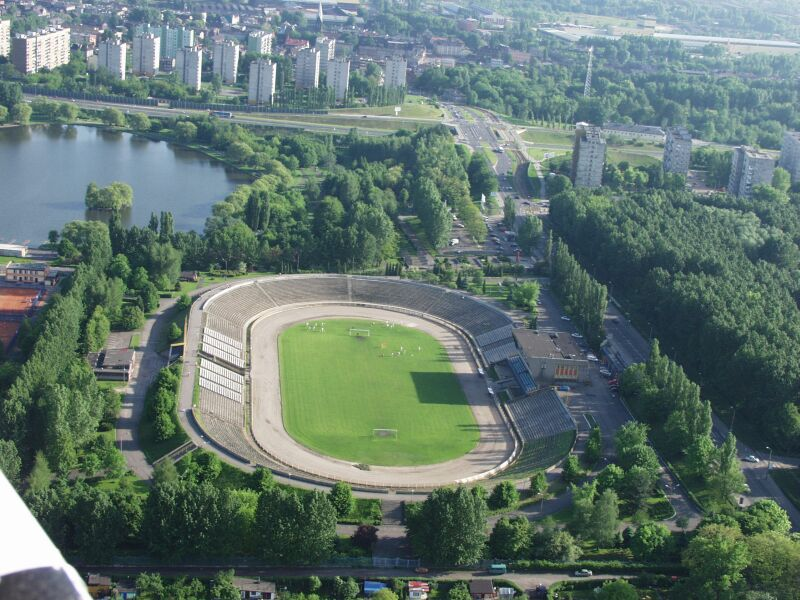
Aerial view of the Stadion Skałka im. Pawła Waloszka in 2010

The Silesian motorcycle section was founded in 1947, but the beginnings of speedway in Świętochłowice are considered to be 1951, when the first speedway track in the city was constructed around the football pitch in the 'Hasiok' (a stadium that had been constructed on a waste dump, from 1934 to 1935 for KS Śląsk). The first speedway took place at the Hasiok on 22 July 22, 1951 and the Hasiok was located adjacent to the Florian Steelworks. The Budowlani Rybnik rider Robert Nawrocki was credited with creating the speedway track as a social act on the National Day of the Rebirth of Poland.

During the 1953 Polish speedway season the team from Stal Ostrów Wlkp moved to Świętochłowice to compete in the Team Speedway Polish Championship.

After relegation in 1955, the club bounced back by winning the in Second division south in 1956.

In the late 1960s the club began to compete at the top level, they won the 1968 second division and then achieved their greatest feat to date, when winning the silver medal in the team championship during the 1969. The success was repeated when winning another silver medal in 1970.

One of their riders Paweł Waloszek won the Golden Helmet in 1968 and finished second in the 1970 Individual Speedway World Championship, behind the legendary Ivan Mauger. Another rider Jan Mucha, won the 1970 Golden Helmet. The Hasiok hosted one of the Polish qualifying rounds for the 1970 Individual Speedway World Championship.

Two more major medals were won in 1972 (bronze) and 1973 (silver).

Due to the expansion of the Florian Steelworks in 1973 the Hasiok was demolished and the club lost its facilities. They would later ride at the Skałka Stadium, which opened in 1979.

In 1984, the team won the second division but following the 1985 season it was relegated from the top division, and following the 1996 season the team withdrew due to financial difficulties. In 1998–2002 the team was revamped and competed in the second and third tiers, eventually withdrawing once again. In 2015, a former rider of the team, Krzysztof Bas, became the head coach.

As of 2023, the club does not participate in professional league competitions and only focuses on youth training.

=== Notable riders ===
- (Poland) Jan Mucha
- (Poland) Paweł Waloszek

=== Honours ===
Competitions	Total	Golden medals		Silver medals		Bronze medals
Competitions	Total	Total	Years	Total	Years	Total	Years
Team (DMP) (since 1948)	4			3	1969, 1970, 1973	1	1972
Team U-21 (MDMP) (since 1978)	0
Pairs (MPPK) (since 1974)	1			1	1983
Pairs U-21 (MMPPK) (1980 U-23; since 1983)	0
Individual (IMP) (since 1948)	3			2	1969, 1972	1	1975
Individual U-21 (MIMP) (since 1967)	0
Total Polish Championship medals: 8		Gold: 0		Silver: 6		Bronze: 2
Competitions	Total	I place		II place		III place
Competitions	Total	Total	Years	Total	Years	Total	Years
European Club (KPE) (since 1998)	0
Team Cup (DPP) (?)	0
Golden Helmet (ZK) (since 1961)	8	2	1968, 1970	5	1966, 1970, 1971, 1974, 1977	1	1973
Silver Helmet U-21 (SK) (since 1966)	1			1	1962
Bronze Helmet U-19 (BK) (1976-81; since 1983)	1			1	1983

== See also ==
- Sport in Poland
