= Ognisko Pińsk =

Polish football club

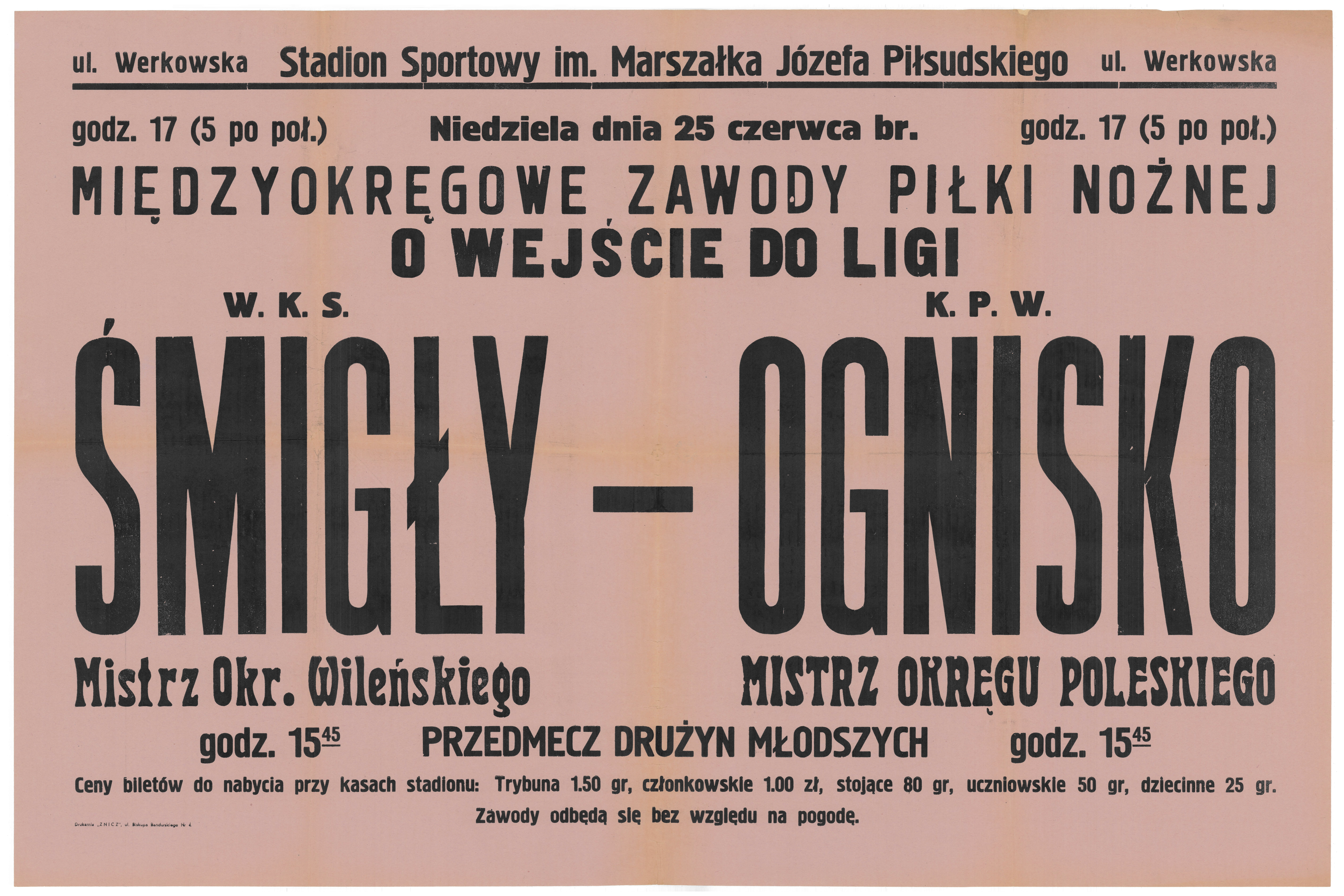
Poster advertising a regional league match between Śmigły Wilno and Ognisko Pińsk, 1939

Ognisko Pińsk was a Polish football team, located in Pińsk, Poland (now Belarus), in the historic territory of Kresy Wschodnie (Polish Eastern Borderlands).

The club was founded in an unknown year and most of its history remains unknown either. In early summer of 1939 Ognisko won the regional league of the Polesie Voivodeship, but it lost qualifiers to the Polish Football League, Pinsk's side was beat both by Śmigły Wilno and WKS Grodno. The club ceased to exist after the Soviet invasion of Poland (1939) at the start of World War II, and was not reestablished after the war, as the city of Pińsk was annexed by the Soviet Union into the Byelorussian Soviet Socialist Republic.

== Sources ==
- (in Polish) A June 22, 1939 newspaper article with history of Ognisko Pinsk.
