= Junak Drohobycz =

Former polish football club

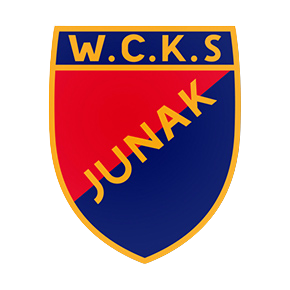
- Full name: Wojskowo-Cywilny Klub Sportowy Junak Drohobycz (Military-Civilian Sports Club Junak Drohobycz)
- Nicknames: Nafciarze (lit. 'Oilmen')
- Founded: 1931
- Dissolved: 1939
- Ground: Junak Drohobycz Stadium
- League: Lwów District League

Junak Drohobycz was a Polish football team, located in Drohobycz in the historic territory of the Polish Eastern Borderlands, what is now Drohobych, Ukraine.

The club was disbanded by the Soviet occupying authorities in the autumn of 1939, following the Soviet invasion of Poland at the start of World War II. In early months of the war, members of Junak created the White Couriers, a boyscouting organization, which smuggled hundreds of persons from the area of Soviet-occupied Lwów (now Lviv) to Hungary, across the Soviet-Hungarian border in the Carpathians.

== History ==
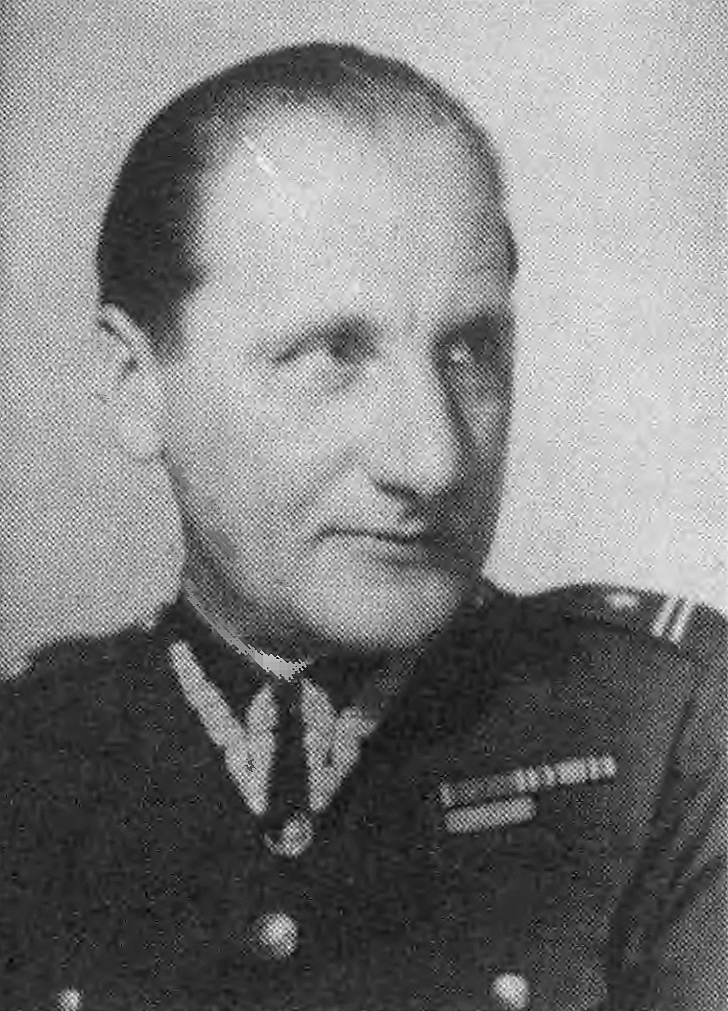
Mieczysław Młotek, chairman of Junak before World War II

In 1922, a sports club Czarni was founded in Drohobych. In 1930 it changed name to Strzelec, and later, in 1931 – to Junak. For the first few years, the new team did not achieve anything significant in Polish football, lagging far behind top teams from Lwów. Crucial was the year 1937 – in March, Captain Mieczysław Młotek from Drohobycz's Polish Army garrison was elected president of the club. He was a great fan of football. Using his influences, Młotek organized Junak's council, which included the most influential citizens of the town (among them – the mayor of Drohobycz).

Drohobych, as well as adjacent town of Borysław (now Boryslav), were interwar centers of Polish oil mining. With the help of numerous factories and local governments of both towns, Junak developed very fast. Numerous players were bought, mostly from renowned teams of Cracovia and Wisła Kraków, and in the spring of 1939 the team won local games of the Lwów region, beating, among others, Czarni Lwów, Ukraina Lwów, Resovia Rzeszów and Polonia Przemyśl. Junak's matches were very popular, with up to 5,000 fans watching them. Supporters would come not only from Drohobycz, but also from Borysław and Schodnica (now Skhidnytsia). Junak's fans were regarded as very rowdy: Polish writer Andrzej Chciuk, who was born and raised in Drohobycz, wrote: "As long as Junak played in C or B class, regular fans came to these games. The team, however, played better and better, and its supporters were worse and worse. They toured the country with the team, as many as 2,000 of them. Arrival of such a crowd to Stryj, Borysław or Stanisławów (now Ivano-Frankivsk) meant trouble for those cities. Those who could not afford to go to away games gathered in front of Drohobycz post office, to listen to updates of the match".

Before reaching play-offs for Ekstraklasa, Junak had to overcame more teams. In June and July 1939, the Drohobycz's side beat Unia Lublin (6–0 and 3–4), Policyjny KS Łuck (7–0 and 3–2) and Strzelec-Górka Stanisławów (6–1 and 0–4). Junak must have been a good team, which was proved in friendly games in the spring and early summer of 1939. It tied 2–2 with Cracovia, 3–3 with Wisła Kraków, also beat 2–1 the amateur champion of Hungary.

=== 1939 – Playoffs for Ekstraklasa ===
On 13 August 1939 Junak played the first game of the play-offs. In Poznań, against Legia Poznań, the score was good (1–1). Then, on 20 August, at home, in a disappointing game versus Śląsk Świętochłowice, neither side scored. The next home game, planned on September 10, against Śmigły Wilno, never took place, because of the German and Soviet invasion of Poland.

It is difficult to speculate if Junak would have won promotion (out of participating 4 teams, 3 were going to be promoted). Team's officials had far-reaching plans, hoping to win the Championship of Poland as early as in 1940. Allegedly, Junak planned to purchase Ernest Willimowski – the forward player of both Ruch Chorzów and Poland national team, by far the best player in interwar Poland. Also, at the beginning of 1939, Junak bought another star of Polish football, Bolesław Habowski from Wisła Kraków.

== Sources ==
- A June 22, 1939 newspaper article with history of Junak Drohobycz (Polish).
