= Śmigły Wilno =

Polish football club

- Full name: Wojskowy Klub Sportowy; Śmigły Wilno
- Founded: 1933; 92 years ago
- Dissolved: 1939; 86 years ago
- Website: www.smiglywilno.pl
Home colours	Away colours

Śmigły Wilno was a Polish association football team. Founded in 1933 in Wilno, Second Polish Republic (now Vilnius, Lithuania). Śmigły's full name was Wojskowy Klub Sportowy "Śmigły" Wilno (Military Sports Club "Śmigły" Wilno). The club enjoyed full support of Wilno's military garrison of the Polish Army, located in present-day Šiaurės miestelis of Žirmūnai; in fact – it was created by a group of officers, passionate fans of soccer.

== History ==
The name "Śmigły" (Agile) for the first time appeared in an interwar Polish sports weekly Raz, Dwa, Trzy, on 8 April 1933. On this day, the soccer team of Wilno beat a team from Siedlce 3–1. The club was the result of a union of different Wilno's soccer teams (such as Strzelec, Pogon, Lauda and Ognisko), none of which had previously achieved any successes. The officers, with Colonel Zygmunt Wenda as the first one who came up with this idea, realized that one big team, representing Wilno, would be the best solution and thus Śmigły was born. The name was a gesture towards Edward Śmigły-Rydz, commander-in-chief of the Polish Army.

=== Śmigły year by year 1933–1939 ===
==== Play-offs finals – 1933 ====
First, in regional games, Śmigły beat the teams of 4 dyon samoch. panc. Brześć nad Bugiem (3–1 and 3–2) and 76 p.p. Grodno (4–1 and 2–1). Then, in the semifinals, overcame Naprzód Lipiny (0–1, 1–0 and 4–2 in additional game, held in Warsaw.) In the finals, however, Polonia Warsaw proved to be too strong. Śmigły lost both games (0–2 and 1–3) and failed to promote to the Polish Soccer League.

==== Play-offs finals – 1934 ====
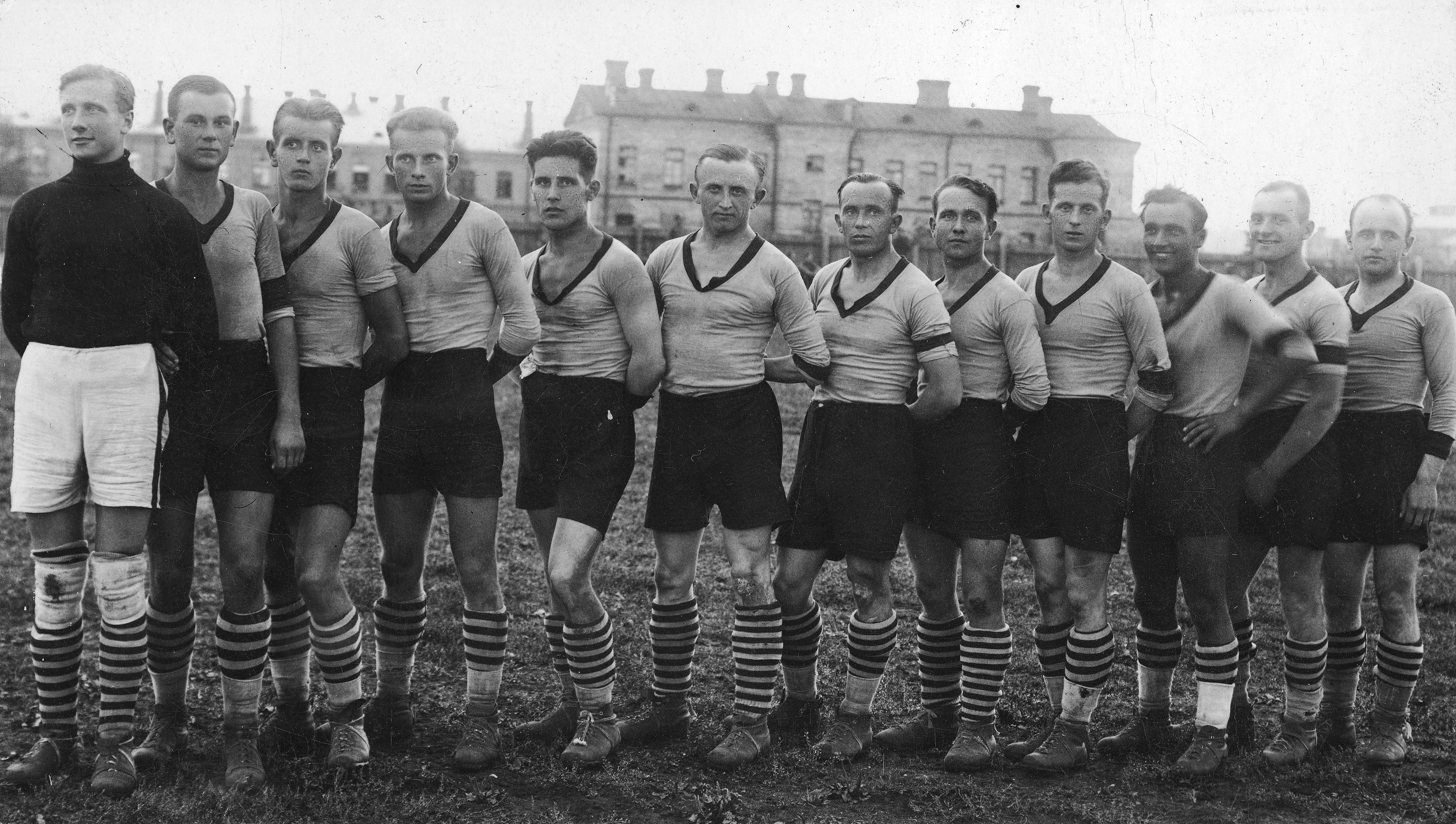
Śmigły team before a friendly game with Gedania Gdańsk in 1934

In 1934, after beating WKS Grodno (12–0 and 6–0) and WKS Brześć nad Bugiem (3–1 and 6–0), Śmigły reached the final group of the play-offs, winner of which was promoted to the Polish Soccer League. This attempt was unsuccessful – in the 3-team group Śmigły finished last, behind Śląsk Świętochłowice (which was promoted) and Naprzód Lipiny.

==== Śmigły in 1935 ====
After winning regional games (against Warmia Grajewo and Kotwica Pinsk), Śmigły, on its way to play-offs finals, faced Czarni Lwów. Wilno's side did not manage to overcome this team (0–2 and 0–0).

==== Play-offs finals – 1936 ====
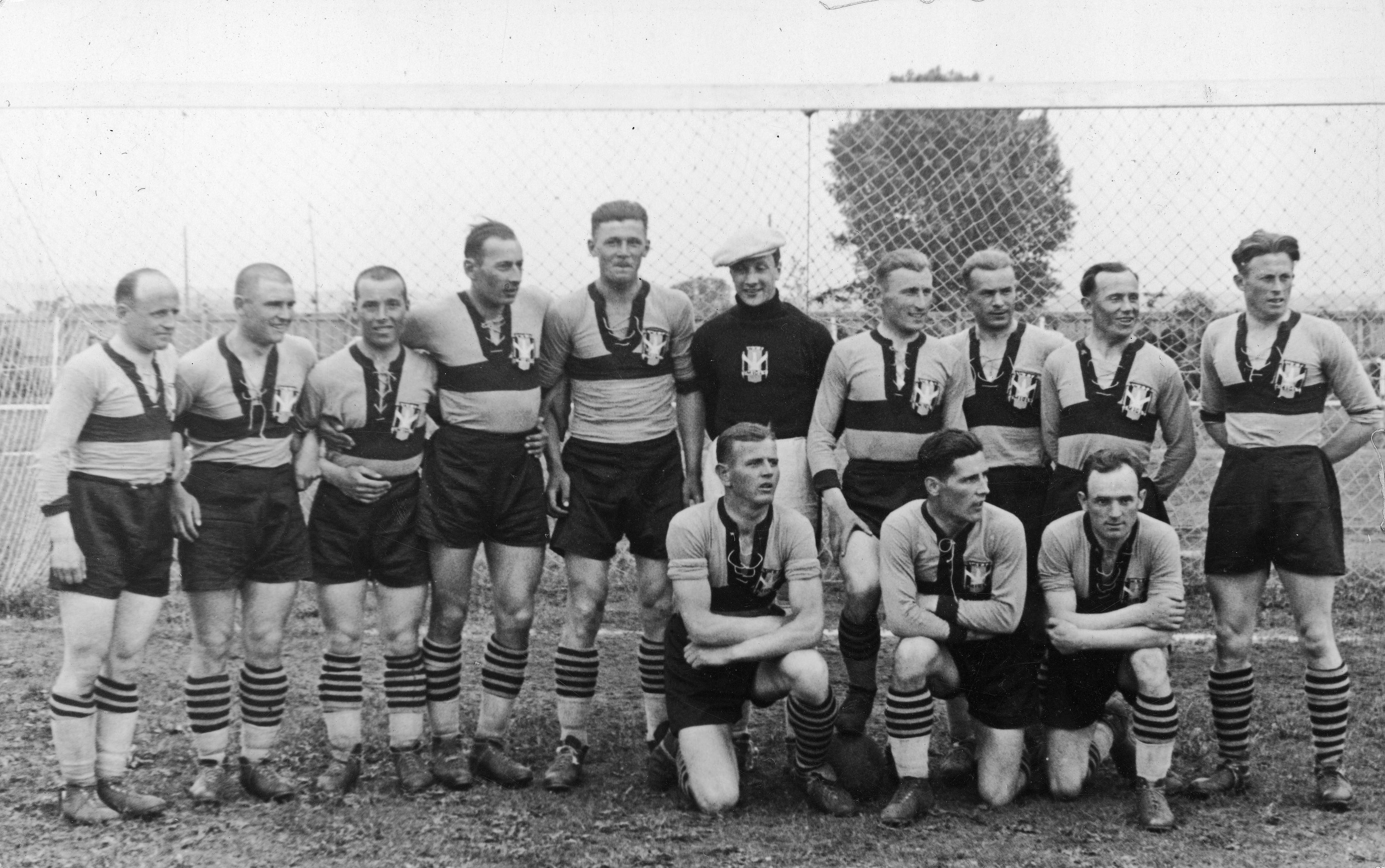
Team in 1936

This time, after beating WKS Grodno and WKS Hallerczyk Rowne, Śmigły reached the play-offs. There, however, waited two reputed teams, which proved impossible to beat for the team from Wilno. Śmigły finished 3rd, ahead of Brygada Częstochowa, but behind AKS Chorzów and Cracovia (both AKS and Cracovia were promoted to the Polish Soccer League and in 1937 these teams dominated the season – Cracovia became champion, AKS was second). Śmigły's scores were: against Cracovia 0–0 and 0–5, against AKS 1–6 and 3–5 and against Brygada 0–2 and 1–0.

==== Promotion – 1937 ====
In regional games, Śmigły beat WKS Grodno (5–4 and 5–1) and Ruch Brześć nad Bugiem (6–0 and 2–1). Then, in the play-offs, Wilno's side placed in the second position, after Polonia Warsaw, but in front of both Brygada Częstochowa and Unia Lublin. On its way to promotion, Śmigły's scores were: with Polonia 0–1 and 1–6, with Brygada 5–1 and 1–3 and with Unia 1–0 and 8–1. It was a notable success, for the first time in the history of northeastern Poland, a team from there won promotion to the 10-team, elite League. Also, last but not least, Śmigły is the only non-Lwów team from former Kresy Wschodnie (Polish Eastern Borderlands) that ever appeared in the League. All other Kresy's teams were from Lwów.

==== Śmigły's lone season in Polish top division – 1938 ====
Śmigły's adventure in the top league lasted for one season only. Wilno's team won 5 games, with only 1 draw and 12 loses. Goals difference was 29–50. Worth mentioning are Śmigły's 3–2 away victory with 1938's vice-champion, Warta Poznań and home's 3–1 victory over 1937's vice-champion, AKS Chorzów.

Śmigły's first game in the League took place on 10 April 1938, in Chorzów, against the best team in Poland – Ruch Chorzów. Wilno's side, after a credible performance, lost 2–5. A historic first home game was held on 24 April 1938, against another great side – Pogoń Lwów. 8,000 fans did not help Śmigły—their favorites lost 0–1. Then, on 1 May, the biggest success of Śmigły occurred. To Wilno, to the stadium located at Werkowska street, came AKS Chorzów (supported by some 600 fans, who came all the way from Chorzów in a special train). This time, Śmigły won 3–1 and 5,000 home fans were overcome with joy. On 3 July 1938, another sensation took place – this time in Poznań. Even though Śmigły, after beating Wisła Kraków 1–0 (26 May 1938 in Wilno, attendance: 4,000), and ŁKS Łódź 4–0 (26 June 1938, attendance: 4,000), was appreciated as a team, nobody was expecting Wilno's side to win 3–2 against Warta. On 4 September, Śmigły's last victory in the League took place, 4–1 against Warszawianka. Then, Wilno's favorites lost 5 games in a row (including 1–7 against AKS Chorzów) and they were relegated, finishing the league in the last, 10th spot. Śmigły's last game in the League took place on 30 October 1938 in Lwów, Wilno's side lost 2–3.

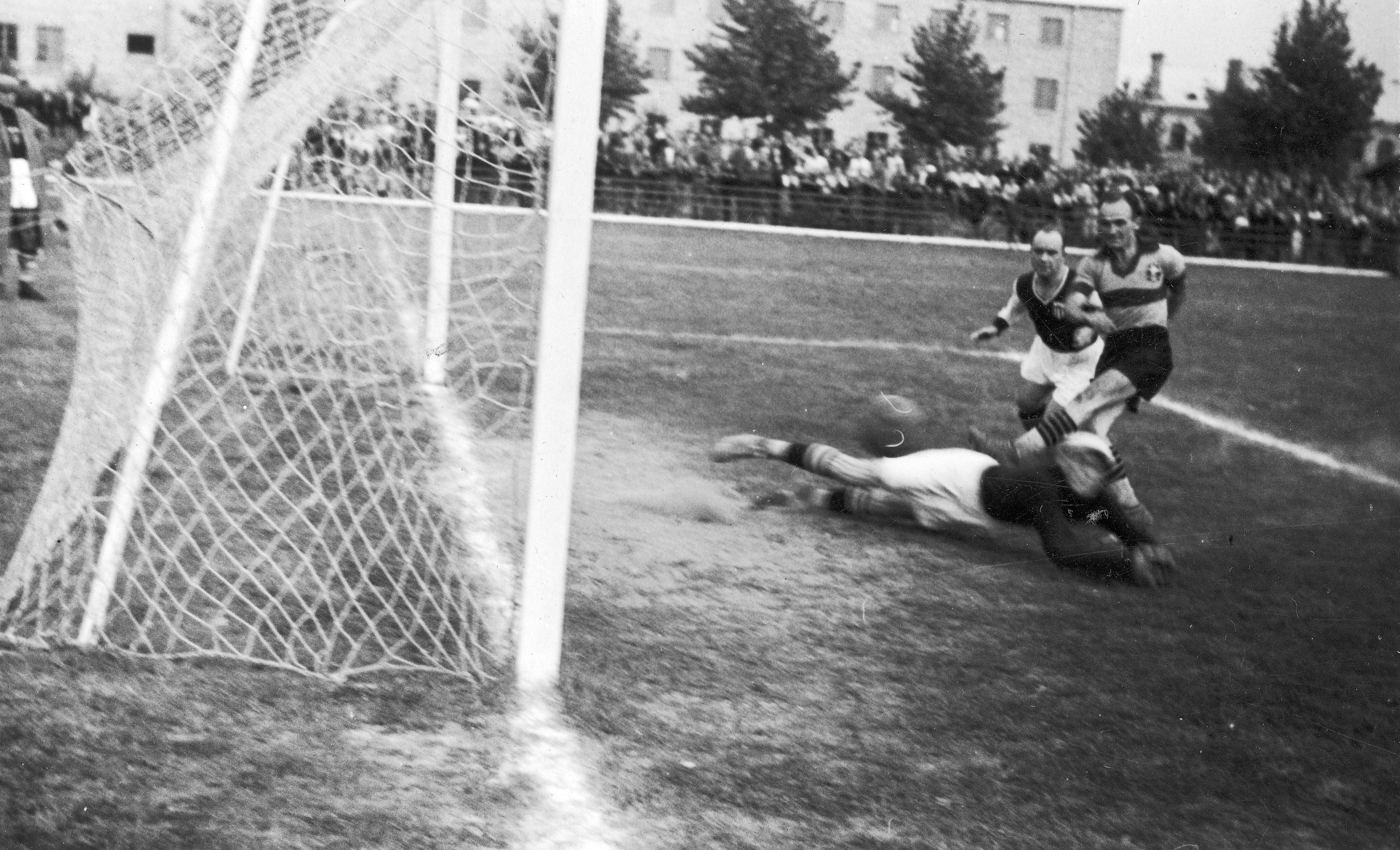
Match Śmigły-Warszawianka (4:1), 1938.

Results of all the games from the 1938 season:

Opponent	Home	Away
Ruch Hajduki Wielkie	2–4	2–5
Warta Poznań	0–1	3–2
Wisła Kraków	1–0	1–4
Polonia Warsaw	0–3	2–5
Pogoń Lwów	0–1	2–3
AKS Chorzów	3–1	1–7
Cracovia	1–3	0–3
Warszawianka	4–1	2–6
Łódzki KS	4–0	1–1

==== Unfinished play-offs – 1939 ====
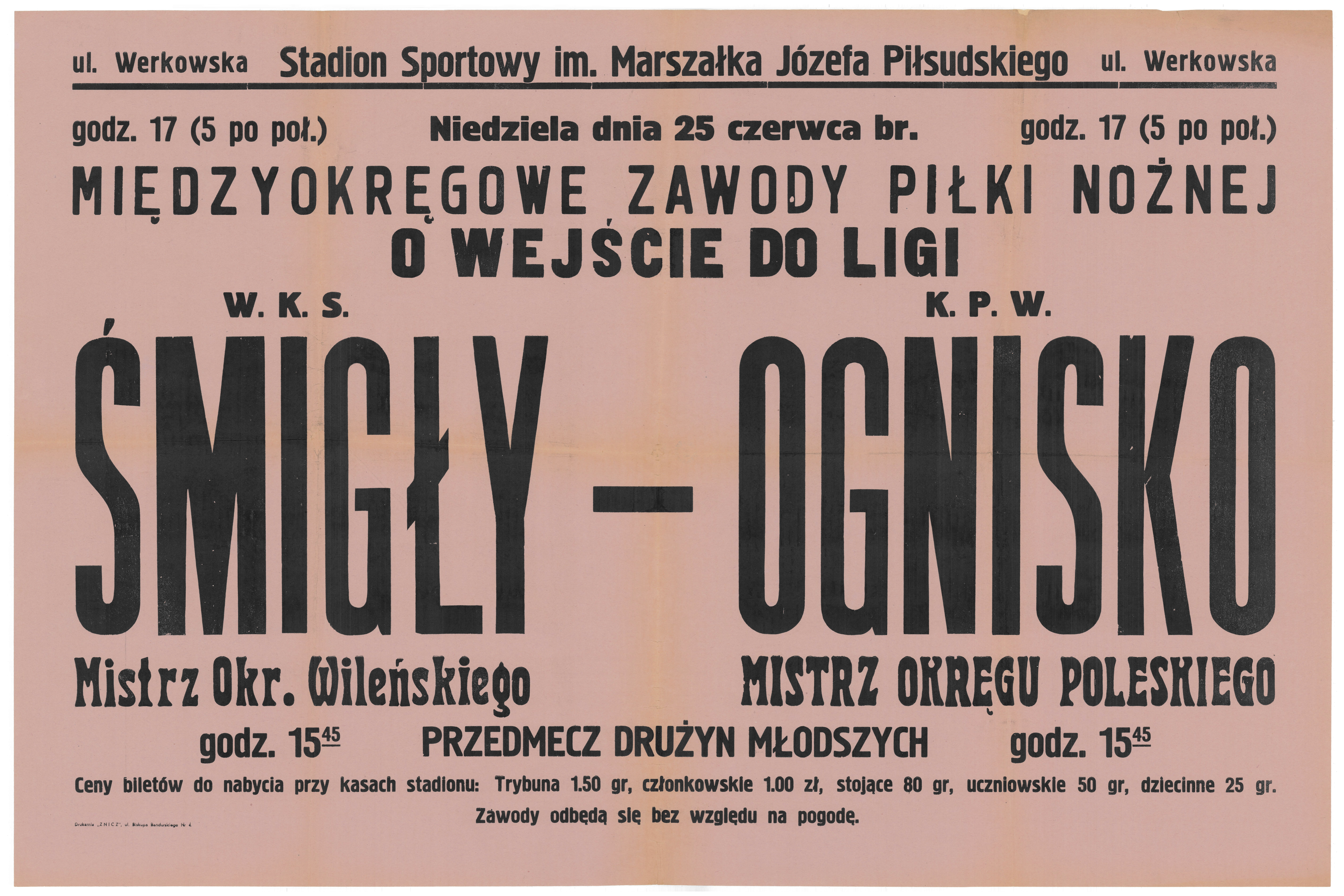
Poster advertising a regional league match between Śmigły Wilno and Ognisko Pińsk, 1939

After relegation, both the players and the officials had one aim, to get back to the top league. In the regional games, Śmigły proved its quality, winning all 4 games against WKS Grodno (5–0 and 9–0) and Ognisko Pinsk (6–0 and 7–0). Then, in the play-offs, it faced Śląsk Świętochłowice, Junak Drohobycz and Legia Poznań (out of these 4 teams, 3 were going to be promoted). Unfortunately, by 1 September 1939, only 2 rounds took place. On 13 August 1939 Śmigły lost at Świętochłowice 1–2 and then, at home beat Legia 5–1 (on 20 August 1939). It was the last game of this club in the history of Polish soccer and it was attended by some 3000 fans, as Przeglad Sportowy wrote. Chronicles inform us of dates of next play-offs games (like on 10 September, away at Drohobycz).

On 1 September 1939, Germany invaded Poland. On 17 September, the Soviet Union did the same. The history of Polish soccer in Wilno came to an end.

== Retro league ==
In 2019, the Śmigły Wilno team had been reconstructed by the historical reconstruction association in Poland as part of the Retro Liga project. The players play in carefully recreated costumes and shoes according to the rules of 1938. The teams chosen for the Retro Liga were those forced to disband in 1939 after the outbreak of World War II. The other teams who took part were WKS Kutno, WKS Łowicz, WKS Grodno (Grodno were not reformed as the borders after WWII meant they were now in Belorussian territory), and Lechia Lwów (Lechia were not reformed as the borders after WWII meant they were now in Ukrainian territory).
