= 1935 Wisła Kraków season =

Wisła Kraków
1935 season
- Chairman: Tadeusz Orzelski
- Ekstraklasa: 4th
- Top goalscorer: Artur Woźniak (16 goals)

The 1935 season was Wisła Kraków's 27th year as a club.

== Friendlies ==
17 February 1935	Wisła Kraków (Poland)	9–0	(Poland) Legja Kraków	Kraków, Poland
11:30 CET (UTC+1)	Woźniak; Łyko; Kopeć; Pazurek	Report		Stadium: Stadion Wisły; Referee: Zdzisław Skowroński (Kraków)

24 February 1935	Wisła Kraków (Poland)	13–0	(Poland) Grzegórzecki KS	Kraków, Poland
11:30 CET (UTC+1)	Woźniak; Obtułowicz; Kopeć; Łyko; Jan Kotlarczyk (pen.)	Report		Stadium: Stadion Wisły; Attendance: 1,000

3 March 1935	Korona Kraków (Poland)	0–4	(Poland) Wisła Kraków	Kraków, Poland
11:15 CET (UTC+1)		Report	Woźniak; Kopeć	Stadium: Boisko Korony

10 March 1935	Wisła Kraków (Poland)	7–2	(Poland) Zwierzyniecki KS	Kraków, Poland
		Report		Stadium: Stadion Wisły

17 March 1935	Wisła Kraków (Poland)	14–1	(Poland) Krowodrza Kraków	Kraków, Poland
11:30 CET (UTC+1)	Woźniak; Samborski; Kopeć	Report	Studliński	Stadium: Stadion Wisły; Attendance: 600; Referee: Jakub Seidner (Kraków)

24 March 1935	Garbarnia Kraków (Poland)	4–2	(Poland) Wisła Kraków	Kraków, Poland
16:00 CET (UTC+1)	Riesner 16'; K. Pazurek 56'; Walicki 76', 88'	Report	Woźniak 11'; Samborski 35'	Stadium: Stadion Cracovii; Attendance: 2,000; Referee: Julian Knobel (Kraków)

21 April 1935	Meidericher SV (Nazi Germany)	3–2	(Poland) Wisła Kraków	Brussels, Belgium
	Kopenturger; Werner; Gunther	Report	Obtułowicz (pen.); Kopeć	Stadium: Stade Joseph Marien; Attendance: 25,000; Referee: John Langenus (Belgium)

22 April 1935	Brussels (Belgium)	2–1	(Poland) Wisła Kraków	Brussels, Belgium
	Quiqueles; Vermaelen	Report	Kopeć	Stadium: Stade Joseph Marien

24 April 1935	CS Pogoń Auchel (France)	1–3	(Poland) Wisła Kraków	France
		Report

27 April 1935	Aniche (France)	0–2	(Poland) Wisła Kraków	Aniche, France
		Report	Woźniak; Kopeć	Attendance: 4,000

28 April 1935	Billy-Montigny (France)	1–2	(Poland) Wisła Kraków	Billy-Montigny, France
	Janowczyk	Report	Kopeć; Habowski

7 June 1935	Chemnitzer PSV (Nazi Germany)	5–7 (a.e.t.)	(Poland) Wisła Kraków	Brussels, Belgium
	Friedemann; Munkelt	Report	Łyko; Lubowiecki; Kopeć; Habowski

9 June 1935	AFC Ajax (Netherlands)	5–3	(Poland) Wisła Kraków	Brussels, Belgium
	Mulders; Fischer; Blomvliet ten Have	Report	Lubowiecki

10 June 1935	Lierse SK (Belgium)	3–2	(Poland) Wisła Kraków	Brussels, Belgium
	Voorhoof ?	Report	Kopeć; Habowski

13 June 1935	Rotterdam (Netherlands)	10–3	(Poland) Wisła Kraków	Brussels, Belgium
		Report	Kopeć; Lubowiecki (pen.); Łyko	Attendance: 10,000

8 July 1935	Wisła Kraków (Poland)	1–1	(Hungary) Újpest FC	Kraków, Poland
18:00 CET (UTC+1)	Habowski 20'; Obtułowicz (penalty missed) ??'	Report	Vincze 16' (pen.)	Stadium: Stadion Wisły; Attendance: 3,000

28 July 1935	Wawel Kraków (Poland)	1–2	(Poland) Wisła Kraków	Kraków, Poland
	Wróbel	Report	Kopeć; Łyko	Referee: Roman Mohyła (Kraków)

15 August 1935	Reprezentacja Bielska (Poland)	1–4	(Poland) Wisła Kraków	Bielsko, Poland
16:30 CET (UTC+1)	Stępień	Report	Obtułowicz; Kopeć; Sołtysik	Stadium: Boisko Hakoahu

29 September 1935	Zakrzowianka Kraków (Poland)	3–10	(Poland) Wisła Kraków	Kraków, Poland
		Report

== Ekstraklasa ==
31 March 1935 1	Legia Warsaw	4–0	Wisła Kraków	Warsaw
12:00 CET (UTC+1)	Nawrot 8'; Gburzyński 15'; Łysakowski 38'; Obtułowicz 47' (o.g.)	Report		Stadium: Stadion Wojska Polskiego; Attendance: 2,000; Referee: Edmund Andrzejak (Łódź)

7 April 1935 2	Wisła Kraków	4–1	Śląsk Świętochłowice	Kraków
16:00 CET (UTC+1)	Obtułowicz 22' (pen.), 54'; Woźniak 42'; Habowski 68'	Report	Gad 17'	Stadium: Stadion Wisły; Attendance: 2,000; Referee: Józef Seeman (Lwów)

14 April 1935 3	Ruch Hajduki Wielkie	4–2	Wisła Kraków	Hajduki Wielkie
	Peterek 31', 44'; Wilimowski 42'; Wodarz 65'	Report	Kopeć 10', 48'	Attendance: 6,000; Referee: Bronisław Romanowski (Warsaw)

5 May 1935 4	Wisła Kraków	4–0	KS Cracovia	Kraków
16:30 CET (UTC+1)	Obtułowicz 21'; Woźniak 58', 72'; Kopeć 74'	Report		Stadium: Stadion Wisły; Attendance: 4,000; Referee: Arnold Haussmann (Lwów)

26 May 1935 5	Wisła Kraków	4–2	Garbarnia Kraków	Kraków
17:00 CET (UTC+1)	Kopeć 46', 89'; Habowski 70'; Obtułowicz 73'	Report	Riesner 37'; K. Pazurek 82'	Stadium: Stadion Wisły; Attendance: 3,000; Referee: Franciszek Krukowski (Warsaw)

2 June 1935 6	Pogoń Lwów	3–1	Wisła Kraków	Lwów
17:15 CET (UTC+1)	Nahaczewski 31'; Borowski 61', 80'	Report	Habowski 20'	Stadium: Stadion Pogoni; Attendance: 5,000; Referee: Bronisław Romanowski (Warsaw)

20 June 1935 7	Wisła Kraków	3–3	KS Warszawianka	Kraków
15:45 CET (UTC+1)	Kopeć 20'; Woźniak 16', 40'	Report	Pyrich 28', 37'; Święcki 54'	Stadium: Stadion Wisły; Attendance: 4,000; Referee: Jakub Seidner (Kraków)

29 June 1935 8	Wisła Kraków	3–1	Warta Poznań	Kraków
15:45 CET (UTC+1)	Kopeć 38', 60'; Woźniak 81'	Report	Kryszkiewicz 10'	Stadium: Stadion Wisły; Attendance: 2,000; Referee: Franciszek Krukowski (Warsaw)

7 July 1935 9	Polonia Warsaw	3–2	Wisła Kraków	Warsaw
	Bieniok 26'; Kula 29'; Puchniarz 35'	Report	Woźniak 25'; Kopeć 31'	Stadium: Stadion Wojska Polskiego; Attendance: 4,000; Referee: Łukasz Gruszka (Chorzów)

14 July 1935 10	ŁKS Łódź	1–2	Wisła Kraków	Łódź
17:30 CET (UTC+1)	Król 37'	Report	Woźniak 39'; Łyko 86'	Stadium: Stadion ŁKS-u; Attendance: 2,500; Referee: Bronisław Romanowski (Warsaw)

4 August 1935 11	Warta Poznań	3–2	Wisła Kraków	Poznań
17:00 CET (UTC+1)	Kryszkiewicz 16', 53'; Lis 38'	Report	Sołtysik 64'; Woźniak 89'	Stadium: Stadion Warty; Attendance: 3,000; Referee: Bronisław Romanowski (Warsaw)

25 August 1935 12	Śląsk Świętochłowice	2–0	Wisła Kraków	Świętochłowice
	Cebula 44'; Gad 75'	Report		Attendance: 3,000; Referee: Mieczysław Walczak (Warsaw)

8 September 1935 13	KS Cracovia	5–0	Wisła Kraków	Kraków
16:00 CET (UTC+1)	Korbas 3'; Malczyk 38'; Doniec 60', 70'; Góra 76' (pen.)	Report		Stadium: Stadion Cracovii; Attendance: 1,500; Referee: Oskar Kurzweil (Lwów)

13 October 1935 14	Wisła Kraków	3–1	Pogoń Lwów	Kraków
11:30 CET (UTC+1)	Kopeć 20'; Łyko 47'; Woźniak 71'	Report	Majowski 43'	Stadium: Stadion Wisły; Attendance: 4,000; Referee: Alfons Raettig (Łódź)

20 October 1935 15	Wisła Kraków	0–0	Ruch Hajduki Wielkie	Kraków
11:30 CET (UTC+1)		Report		Stadium: Stadion Wisły; Attendance: 4,000; Referee: Franciszek Krukowski (Warsaw)

27 October 1935 16	Wisła Kraków	8–1	Polonia Warsaw	Kraków
11:30 CET (UTC+1)	Łyko 16'; Woźniak 20', 40', 50'; Kopeć 25', 44', 77'; Habowski 73'	Report	R. Bułanow 7'	Stadium: Stadion Wisły; Attendance: 1,500; Referee: Bolesław Posner (Bielsko)

10 November 1935 17	Wisła Kraków	5–0	Legia Warsaw	Kraków
12:00 CET (UTC+1)	Habowski 16'; Łyko 18' (pen.), 32' (pen.); Woźniak 51'; Sołtysik 73'	Report		Stadium: Stadion Wisły; Attendance: 1,500; Referee: Łukasz Gruszka (Chorzów)

17 November 1935 18	Wisła Kraków	4–2	ŁKS Łódź	Kraków
11:00 CET (UTC+1)	Habowski 48', 68'; Sołtysik 59'; Woźniak 75'	Report	Miller 10'; Gątkiewicz 69'	Stadium: Stadion Wisły; Attendance: 3,000; Referee: Walenty Gerblich (Katowice)

24 November 1935 19	Garbarnia Kraków	1–1	Wisła Kraków	Kraków
11:30 CET (UTC+1)	Riesner 52'	Report	Habowski 70'	Stadium: Stadion Garbarni; Attendance: 1,000; Referee: Alfons Raettig (Łódź)

1 December 1935 20	KS Warszawianka	1–3	Wisła Kraków	Warsaw
	Pyrich 89'	Report	Łyko 48'; Woźniak 78'; Kopeć 82'	Stadium: Stadion Warszawianki; Attendance: 1,000; Referee: Franciszek Krukowski (Warsaw)

== Squad, appearances and goals ==
No.	Pos	Nat	Player	Total		I Liga	
No.	Pos	Nat	Player	Apps	Goals	Apps	Goals
	GK	(Poland) POL	Maksymilian Koźmin	11	0	10+1	0
	GK	(Poland) POL	Edward Madejski	10	0	10+0	0
	DF	(Poland) POL	Stanisław Cholewa	2	0	2+0	0
	DF	(Poland) POL	Eugeniusz Oleksik	1	0	1+0	0
	DF	(Poland) POL	Aleksander Pychowski	1	0	1+0	0
	DF	(Poland) POL	Stanisław Szczepanik	13	0	13+0	0
	DF	(Poland) POL	Władysław Szumilas	18	0	18+0	0
	DF	(Poland) POL	Andrzej Woźniak	2	0	2+0	0
	MF	(Poland) POL	Karol Bajorek	7	0	7+0	0
	MF	(Poland) POL	Mieczysław Jezierski	13	0	13+0	0
	MF	(Poland) POL	Jan Kotlarczyk	20	0	20+0	0
	MF	(Poland) POL	Józef Kotlarczyk	20	0	20+0	0
	FW	(Poland) POL	Mieczysław Balcer	1	0	1+0	0
	FW	(Poland) POL	Mieczysław Gracz	1	0	1+0	0
	FW	(Poland) POL	Bolesław Habowski	20	8	20+0	8
	FW	(Poland) POL	Henryk Kopeć	20	14	20+0	14
	FW	(Poland) POL	Stefan Lubowiecki	3	0	3+0	0
	FW	(Poland) POL	Antoni Łyko	20	6	20+0	6
	FW	(Poland) POL	Stanisław Obtułowicz	8	4	8+0	4
	FW	(Poland) POL	Julian Samborski	1	0	1+0	0
	FW	(Poland) POL	Kazimierz Sołtysik	9	3	9+0	3
	FW	(Poland) POL	Artur Woźniak	20	16	20+0	16

=== Goalscorers ===
Place	Position	Nation	Name	I Liga
1	FW	(Poland)	Artur Woźniak	16
2	FW	(Poland)	Henryk Kopeć	14
3	FW	(Poland)	Bolesław Habowski	8
4	FW	(Poland)	Antoni Łyko	6
5	FW	(Poland)	Stanisław Obtułowicz	4
6	FW	(Poland)	Kazimierz Sołtysik	3
			Total	51
