= 1936 Wisła Kraków season =

Wisła Kraków
1936 season
- Chairman: Tadeusz Orzelski
- Ekstraklasa: 2nd
- Top goalscorer: Artur Woźniak (6 goals)

The 1936 season was Wisła Kraków's 28th year as a club.

== Friendlies ==
3 February 1936	Wisła Kraków (Poland)	8–1	(Poland) Nadwiślan Kraków	Kraków, Poland
11:30 CET (UTC+1)	Kopeć; Gracz; Łyko	Report	Kopeć II	Stadium: Stadion Wisły; Referee: Władysław Pryk (Kraków)

9 February 1936	Wisła Kraków (Poland)	27–1	(Poland) Olsza Kraków	Kraków, Poland
11:30 CET (UTC+1)	Woźniak; Kopeć; Łyko; Kozłowski; Habowski	Report		Stadium: Stadion Wisły

1 March 1936	Wawel Nowa Wieś (Poland)	3–3	(Poland) Wisła Kraków	Nowa Wieś, Poland
	Herisch; Rzepuś	Report	Habowski; Kozłowski	Attendance: 2,000; Referee: Łukasz Gruszka (Chorzów)

8 March 1936	Wisła Kraków (Poland)	4–1	(Poland) Zwierzyniecki KS	Kraków, Poland
15:30 CET (UTC+1)	Kopeć; Filek; Habowski	Report	Barah	Stadium: Stadion Wisły; Referee: Karol Zapiór (Kraków)

13 March 1936	Makkabi Kraków (Poland)	0–11	(Poland) Wisła Kraków	Kraków, Poland
15:30 CET (UTC+1)		Report	Woźniak; Obtułowicz; Łyko; Habowski; Kozłowski	Stadium: Stadion Makkabi; Referee: Kazimierz Seichter (Kraków)

15 March 1936	Wisła Kraków (Poland)	8–0	(Poland) Krowodrza Kraków	Kraków, Poland
15:45 CET (UTC+1)	Woźniak; Łyko; Kopeć; Sołtysik	Report		Stadium: Stadion Wisły

21 March 1936	Wisła Kraków (Poland)	1–2	(Poland) Naprzód Lipiny	Kraków, Poland
11:30 CET (UTC+1)	Kopeć 80'	Report	Kandela 15', 77'	Stadium: Stadion Wisły; Attendance: 800; Referee: Karol Zapiór (Kraków)

28 March 1936	Wisła Kraków (Poland)	4–1	(Nazi Germany) Preussen Hindenburg	Kraków, Poland
16:15 CET (UTC+1)	Woźniak 20', 62'; Łyko 67', 70'	Report	Dlubatz	Stadium: Stadion Wisły; Attendance: 1,000; Referee: Władysław Pryk (Kraków)

12 April 1936	Antwerp (Belgium)	1–1	(Poland) Wisła Kraków	Antwerp, Belgium
14:30 CET (UTC+1)	Nelis 78'	Report	Łyko 33'	Attendance: 10,000

14 April 1936	Ferencváros FC (Hungary)	3–0	(Poland) Wisła Kraków	Antwerp, Belgium
	Toldi 35', ??'; Sárosi 70'	Report		Attendance: 12,000

24 May 1936	Wisła Kraków (Poland)	1–0	(England) Chelsea FC	Kraków, Poland
17:30 CET (UTC+1)	Łyko 45' (pen.)	Report	Miller (red card) 73'	Stadium: Stadion Wisły; Attendance: 10,000; Referee: Andrzej Rutkowski (Kraków)

19 July 1936	Unia Sosnowiec (Poland)	3–2	(Poland) Wisła Kraków	Sosnowiec, Poland
	Brzozowski; Staniszowski; Pałka	Report	Habowski; Kopeć

9 August 1936	Iskra Siemianowice (Poland)	3–0	(Poland) Wisła Kraków	Siemianowice, Poland
17:00 CET (UTC+1)	Meljon; Rzychoń	Report		Stadium: Boisko Iskry; Attendance: 1,000

14 August 1936	Wisła Kraków (Poland)	2–4	(Poland) Zwierzyniecki KS	Kraków, Poland
11:30 CET (UTC+1)	Kopeć	Report	Konupek; Pamuła	Stadium: Stadion Wisły

15 August 1936	Stadion Mikołów (Poland)	2–1	(Poland) Wisła Kraków	Mikołów, Poland
17:00 CET (UTC+1)	Klemens	Report	Obtułowicz

16 August 1936	Makkabi Kraków (Poland)	1–0	(Poland) Wisła Kraków	Kraków, Poland
17:00 CET (UTC+1)	Hauptman	Report		Stadium: Stadion Makkabi

2 September 1936	KS Cracovia (Poland)	2–0	(Poland) Wisła Kraków	Kraków, Poland
16:30 CET (UTC+1)	Grünberg 25'; Kossok 70'	Report		Stadium: Stadion Cracovii; Attendance: 3,000

8 November 1936	Wisła Kraków (Poland)	3–2	(Poland) KS Cracovia	Kraków, Poland
11:30 CET (UTC+1)	Woźniak 12' (pen.); Szewczyk 33'; Natanek 58'	Report	Szeliga 23'; Korbas ??'	Stadium: Stadion Wisły; Attendance: 5,000

== Ekstraklasa ==
5 April 1936 1	Wisła Kraków	2–0	Śląsk Świętochłowice	Kraków
16:00 CET (UTC+1)	Łyko 23' (pen.); Kopeć 40'	Report		Stadium: Stadion Wisły; Attendance: 2,500; Referee: Oskar Kurzweil (Lwów)

19 April 1936 2	Dąb Katowice	0–1	Wisła Kraków	Katowice
14:00 CET (UTC+1)		Report	Habowski 21'	Stadium: Boisko Pogoni; Attendance: 3,000; Referee: Zygmunt Lange (Łódź)

26 April 1936 3	Wisła Kraków	2–1	Pogoń Lwów	Kraków
16:15 CET (UTC+1)	Łyko (penalty missed) 6', 77' (pen.); Bereza 10' (o.g.)	Report	Matyas (penalty missed) 62'; Borowski 71'	Stadium: Stadion Wisły; Attendance: 2,000; Referee: Walenty Gerblich (Katowice)

3 May 1936 4	KS Warszawianka	1–1	Wisła Kraków	Warsaw
	Korngold 68'	Report	Woźniak 24'	Stadium: Stadion Warszawianki; Attendance: 4,000; Referee: Kazimierz Wardęszkiewicz (Łódź)

10 May 1936 5	Wisła Kraków	1–4	Warta Poznań	Kraków
16:30 CET (UTC+1)	Woźniak 53'	Report	F. Scherfke 15', 27', 30'; Kryszkiewicz 18'	Stadium: Stadion Wisły; Attendance: 2,000; Referee: Zygmunt Lange (Łódź)

17 May 1936 6	Garbarnia Kraków	2–1	Wisła Kraków	Kraków
16:30 CET (UTC+1)	Riesner 14'; Skóra 77'	Report	Woźniak 11'	Stadium: Stadion Garbarni; Attendance: 3,000; Referee: Oskar Kurzweil (Lwów)

7 June 1936 7	Wisła Kraków	1–0	Legia Warsaw	Kraków
17:30 CET (UTC+1)	Habowski 67'	Report		Stadium: Stadion Wisły; Attendance: 2,000; Referee: Karol Zapiór (Kraków)

14 June 1936 8	Wisła Kraków	3–1	ŁKS Łódź	Kraków
17:45 CET (UTC+1)	Łyko 10' (pen.), 35' (pen.); Filek 85'	Report	Koczewski 14'	Stadium: Stadion Wisły; Attendance: 1,500; Referee: Arnold Haussmann (Lwów)

28 June 1936 9	Ruch Hajduki Wielkie	1–0	Wisła Kraków	Hajduki Wielkie
17:30 CET (UTC+1)	Wodarz 45'	Report		Stadium: Stadion Ruchu; Attendance: 10,000; Referee: Kazimierz Wardęszkiewicz (Łódź)

5 July 1936 10	Śląsk Świętochłowice	0–2	Wisła Kraków	Świętochłowice
15:00 CET (UTC+1)	Pogodzik (penalty missed) ??'	Report	Filek 5'; Sołtysik 72'	Stadium: Boisko Śląska; Attendance: 3,000; Referee: Wawrzyniec Staliński (Poznań)

23 August 1936 11	Wisła Kraków	2–2	Garbarnia Kraków	Kraków
16:30 CET (UTC+1)	Łyko (penalty missed) 11'; Woźniak 28'; Sitko 90'	Report	S. Woźniak 14'; K. Pazurek 73'	Stadium: Stadion Wisły; Attendance: 2,000; Referee: Jan Laband (Katowice)

30 August 1936 12	Pogoń Lwów	2–0	Wisła Kraków	Lwów
	Nahaczewski 32', 55'; Majowski (penalty missed) 50'	Report		Stadium: Stadion Pogoni; Attendance: 4,000; Referee: Łukasz Gruszka (Chorzów)

20 September 1936 13	ŁKS Łódź	0–2	Wisła Kraków	Łódź
15:30 CET (UTC+1)		Report	Filek 78'; Łyko 86'	Stadium: Stadion ŁKS-u; Attendance: 4,000; Referee: Karol Bergtal (Warsaw)

27 September 1936 14	Wisła Kraków	0–3	KS Warszawianka	Kraków
11:30 CET (UTC+1)		Report	Piliszek 16', 87'; Smoczek 49'	Stadium: Stadion Wisły; Attendance: 2,000; Referee: Józef Seeman (Lwów)

11 October 1936 15	Warta Poznań	2–1	Wisła Kraków	Poznań
14:30 CET (UTC+1)	Kryszkiewicz 43'; Gendera 62'	Report	Woźniak 66'	Stadium: Stadion Warty; Attendance: 2,500; Referee: Bronisław Romanowski (Warsaw)

18 October 1936 16	Wisła Kraków	5–2	Dąb Katowice	Kraków
11:30 CET (UTC+1)	Szewczyk 16', 32'; Gracz 39', 84'; Habowski 65'	Report	Kessner 45' (pen.); Sitko 88' (o.g.)	Stadium: Stadion Wisły; Attendance: 1,200; Referee: Michał Frank (Wilno)

25 October 1936 17	Wisła Kraków	3–1	Ruch Hajduki Wielkie	Kraków
14:30 CET (UTC+1)	Szewczyk 41', 75'; Gracz 62'	Report	Wilimowski 58'	Stadium: Stadion Wisły; Attendance: 4,000; Referee: Alfons Raettig (Łódź)

1 November 1936 18	Legia Warsaw	2–3	Wisła Kraków	Warsaw
	Frankowski 30'; Przeździecki 64'	Report	Woźniak 10'; Kubera 16' (o.g.); Szewczyk 70'	Stadium: Stadion Wojska Polskiego; Attendance: 1,000; Referee: Zygmunt Lange (Łódź)

== Squad, appearances and goals ==
No.	Pos	Nat	Player	Total		I Liga	
No.	Pos	Nat	Player	Apps	Goals	Apps	Goals
	GK	(Poland) POL	Stanisław Geruli	2	0	2+0	0
	GK	(Poland) POL	Maksymilian Koźmin	2	0	0+2	0
	GK	(Poland) POL	Edward Madejski	16	0	16+0	0
	DF	(Poland) POL	Stanisław Cholewa	1	0	1+0	0
	DF	(Poland) POL	Alojzy Sitko	8	1	8+0	1
	DF	(Poland) POL	Stanisław Szczepanik	9	0	9+0	0
	DF	(Poland) POL	Władysław Szumilas	18	0	18+0	0
	MF	(Poland) POL	Karol Bajorek	2	0	2+0	0
	MF	(Poland) POL	Franciszek Gierczyński	4	0	4+0	0
	MF	(Poland) POL	Mieczysław Jezierski	18	0	18+0	0
	MF	(Poland) POL	Jan Kotlarczyk	14	0	14+0	0
	MF	(Poland) POL	Józef Kotlarczyk	16	0	16+0	0
	FW	(Poland) POL	Władysław Filek	6	1	6+0	1
	FW	(Poland) POL	Mieczysław Gracz	4	3	4+0	3
	FW	(Poland) POL	Bolesław Habowski	18	3	18+0	3
	FW	(Poland) POL	Henryk Kopeć	14	1	14+0	1
	FW	(Poland) POL	Antoni Łyko	14	5	14+0	5
	FW	(Poland) POL	Jan Natanek	3	0	3+0	0
	FW	(Poland) POL	Jan Sarna	1	0	1+0	0
	FW	(Poland) POL	Kazimierz Sołtysik	10	1	10+0	1
	FW	(Poland) POL	Władysław Szewczyk	4	5	4+0	5
	FW	(Poland) POL	Artur Woźniak	14	6	14+0	6
	FW	(Poland) POL	Henryk Zatorski	2	2	2+0	2

=== Goalscorers ===
Place	Position	Nation	Name	I Liga
1	FW	(Poland)	Artur Woźniak	6
2	FW	(Poland)	Antoni Łyko	5
2	FW	(Poland)	Władysław Szewczyk	5
4	FW	(Poland)	Bolesław Habowski	3
4	FW	(Poland)	Mieczysław Gracz	3
6	FW	(Poland)	Henryk Zatorski	2
7	DF	(Poland)	Alojzy Sitko	1
7	FW	(Poland)	Henryk Kopeć	1
7	FW	(Poland)	Kazimierz Sołtysik	1
7	FW	(Poland)	Władysław Filek	1
			Total	28
