= 1934 Wisła Kraków season =

Wisła Kraków
1934 season
- Chairman: Tadeusz Orzelski
- Manager: Vilmos Nyúl (from 22 April 1934)
- Ekstraklasa: 3rd
- Top goalscorer: Artur Woźniak (12 goals); Stanisław Obtułowicz (12 goals)

The 1934 season was Wisła Kraków's 26th year as a club.

== Friendlies ==
| 2 February 1934 | Wisła Kraków (Poland) | 17–0 | (Poland) Legja Kraków | Kraków, Poland |
| 11:30 CET (UTC+1) | Łyko; Woźniak; Habowski; J. Reyman; Obtułowicz; Jezierski | Report | | Stadium: Stadion Wisły; Referee: Franciszek Babirecki (Kraków) |

| 11 February 1934 | Wisła Kraków (Poland) | 0–1 | (Poland) Grzegórzecki KS | Kraków, Poland |
| 11:30 CET (UTC+1) | | Report | Strugała | Stadium: Stadion Wisły |

| 18 February 1934 | Wisła Kraków (Poland) | 7–3 | (Poland) Zwierzyniecki KS | Kraków, Poland |
| 11:30 CET (UTC+1) | Obtułowicz; Łyko; Woźniak; A. Stefaniuk | Report | Pamuła; Konopek; Kozera | Stadium: Stadion Wisły; Referee: Edward Stopa (Kraków) |

| 25 February 1934 | Wisła Kraków (Poland) | 3–1 | (Poland) Wawel Kraków | Kraków, Poland |
| 11:30 CET (UTC+1) | J. Reyman; Łyko; Obtułowicz (pen.) | Report | Sucharski | Stadium: Stadion Wisły; Attendance: 500; Referee: Józef Lustgarten (Kraków) |

| 4 March 1934 | Korona Kraków (Poland) | 0–4 | (Poland) Wisła Kraków | Kraków, Poland |
| 11:00 CET (UTC+1) | | Report | Łyko; Obtułowicz; Woźniak | Stadium: Boisko Korony; Referee: Jakub Seidner (Kraków) |

| 13 March 1934 | Wisła Kraków (Poland) | 3–0 | (Poland) Krowodrza Kraków | Kraków, Poland |
| 11:30 CET (UTC+1) | Woźniak; Obtułowicz; Łyko | Report | | Stadium: Stadion Wisły; Referee: Julian Rumpler (Kraków) |

| 18 March 1934 | Wisła Kraków (Poland) | 6–0 | (Poland) Policyjny KS Katowice | Kraków, Poland |
| 15:30 CET (UTC+1) | Obtułowicz 29', 65'; J. Reyman 52'; Łyko 82'; Woźniak 84', 87' | Report | | Stadium: Stadion Wisły; Referee: Maksymilian Schneider (Kraków) |

| 26 March 1934 | Wisła Kraków (Poland) | 6–1 | (Poland) Legja Kraków | Kraków, Poland |
| 15:30 CET (UTC+1) | Woźniak; Obtułowicz; J. Reyman; Jan Kotlarczyk (pen.) | Report | Turecki | Stadium: Stadion Wisły; Referee: Jakub Seidner (Kraków) |

| 1 April 1934 | Wisła Kraków (Poland) | 1–6 | (Austria) SC Wacker Vienna | Kraków, Poland |
| 15:45 CET (UTC+1) | Woźniak 80' | Report | Zischek 10', 18'; Hanreiter ??', 36', 53'; Kremsner 83' | Stadium: Stadion Wisły; Attendance: 4,000; Referee: Jakub Seidner (Kraków) |

| 3 May 1934 | Unia Sosnowiec (Poland) | 4–2 | (Poland) Wisła Kraków | Sosnowiec, Poland |
| | Staniszewski 22'; Nowak 34', 59'; Kubzda 67' | Report | Lubowiecki 44'; Pazurek ??' | Attendance: 2,000 |

| 6 May 1934 | Vorwärts-Rasensport Gleiwitz (Nazi Germany) | 2–2 | (Poland) Wisła Kraków | Gleiwitz, Germany |
| | Kamalla 25', 55' | Report | Łyko 10'; Adamek 27' | Attendance: 2,000 |

| 17 June 1934 | Reprezentacja Rybnika (Poland) | 2–5 | (Poland) Wisła Kraków | Rybnik, Poland |
| 17:30 CET (UTC+1) | | Report | Obtułowicz; Sołtysik; Pazurek; Jędrzejczyk | Stadium: Boisko TS Rybnik; Attendance: 2,000 |

| 1 July 1934 | Preussen Hindenburg (Nazi Germany) | 1–0 | (Poland) Wisła Kraków | Hindenburg, Germany |
| | Jureczek | Report | | Attendance: 1,000 |

| 12 July 1934 | Wisła Kraków (Poland) | 2–2 | (Austria) FC Wien | Kraków, Poland |
| 18:00 CET (UTC+1) | Łyko 50'; Woźniak 76' (pen.) | Report | Riegler 32'; Weilinger 53' | Attendance: 2,000; Referee: Franciszek Babirecki (Kraków) |

| 15 July 1934 | Reprezentacja Częstochowy (Poland) | 3–3 | (Poland) Wisła Kraków | Częstochowa, Poland |
| | Gątkiewicz; Jędrzejkiewicz | Report | Woźniak; Bocheński; Woźniak | Attendance: 2,400 |

| 29 July 1934 | Olsza Kraków (Poland) | 1–6 | (Poland) Wisła Kraków | Kraków, Poland |
| 17:00 CET (UTC+1) | Malarz | Report | Woźniak; Obtułowicz; Sołtysik; Łyko | Stadium: Boisko Olszy |

| 12 August 1934 | Wisła Kraków (Poland) | 12–2 | (France) Repr. Emigracji Francuskiej | Kraków, Poland |
| 15:15 CET (UTC+1) | | Report | | Stadium: Stadion Wisły; Referee: Eugeniusz Kochanek (Kraków) |

| 19 August 1934 | Tarnovia Tarnów (Poland) | 2–7 | (Poland) Wisła Kraków | Tarnów, Poland |
| | Krawczyk; Jeż | Report | Kopeć; Żijko; Pazurek; Obtułowicz | Stadium: Stadion Tarnovii |

| 25 August 1934 | Gwiazda Kielce (Poland) | 0–14 | (Poland) Wisła Kraków | Kielce, Poland |
| | | Report | Woźniak; Kopeć; Łyko; Sołtysik; Habowski; Koźmin (pen.) |

=== Mixed teams ===
| 26 July 1934 | Wisła Kraków / KS Cracovia (Poland) | 2–3 | (Austria) FC Libertas Wien | Kraków, Poland |
| 18:00 CET (UTC+1) | Kisieliński 65'; Habowski 89' | Report | Vitavsky 7', 52'; Schönwetter 85' | Stadium: Stadion Cracovii; Attendance: 2,000; Referee: Maksymilian Gumplowicz (Kraków) |

== Ekstraklasa ==
| 8 April 1934 1 | KS Warszawianka | 1–4 | Wisła Kraków | Warsaw |
| 16:00 CET (UTC+1) | Prosator 30' | Report | Woźniak 34'; J. Reyman 41', 50'; Obtułowicz 77' | Stadium: Stadion Wojska Polskiego; Attendance: 2,000; Referee: Wawrzyniec Staniński (Poznań) |

| 22 April 1934 2 | Wisła Kraków | 0–0 | Polonia Warsaw | Kraków |
| 16:00 CET (UTC+1) | | Report | | Stadium: Stadion Wisły; Attendance: 3,000; Referee: Maksymilian Schneider (Kraków) |

| 29 April 1934 3 | Ruch Hajduki Wielkie | 4–1 | Wisła Kraków | Hajduki Wielkie |
| 16:15 CET (UTC+1) | Peterek 14'; Wilimowski 17'; Giemsa 36'; Wodarz 59' | Report | Sołtysik 76' | Stadium: Boisko Ruchu; Attendance: 8,000; Referee: Zygmunt Lange (Łódź) |

| 10 May 1934 4 | Wisła Kraków | 2–2 | Warta Poznań | Kraków |
| 16:30 CET (UTC+1) | Łyko 11'; Lubowiecki 16' | Report | Nowacki 32'; Knioła 55' | Stadium: Stadion Wisły; Attendance: 2,000; Referee: Oskar Kurzweil (Lwów) |

| 27 May 1934 5 | Wisła Kraków | 2–0 | Pogoń Lwów | Kraków |
| 17:00 CET (UTC+1) | Łyko (penalty missed) 28'; Obtułowicz 41' (pen.); Woźniak 47' | Report | Deutschmann (red card) 41' | Stadium: Stadion Wisły; Attendance: 2,000; Referee: Borys Mazur (Sosnowiec) |

| 3 June 1934 6 | WKS 22 PP Siedlce | 0–3 | Wisła Kraków | Siedlce |
| | | Report | Łyko 17'; Obtułowicz 61'; Woźniak 65' | Attendance: 1,500; Referee: Bronisław Romanowski (Warsaw) |

| 10 June 1934 7 | KS Cracovia | 2–1 | Wisła Kraków | Kraków |
| 17:30 CET (UTC+1) | Pająk 5'; Malczyk 85' | Report | Łyko 73' | Stadium: Stadion Cracovii; Attendance: 5,000; Referee: Arnold Haussmann (Lwów) |

| 16 June 1934 8 | Podgórze Kraków | 1–5 | Wisła Kraków | Kraków |
| 17:30 CET (UTC+1) | Hodór 60' | Report | Sołtysik 22'; Łyko 45'; Obtułowicz 54', 61'; J. Reyman 74' | Stadium: Stadion Podgórza; Attendance: 1,500; Referee: Karol Schimke (Bielsko) |

| 24 June 1934 9 | Wisła Kraków | 0–2 | ŁKS Łódź | Kraków |
| 17:30 CET (UTC+1) | | Report | Sowiak 72'; Schwarzbach 75' | Stadium: Stadion Wisły; Attendance: 2,000; Referee: Bolesław Posner (Bielsko) |

| 29 June 1934 10 | Legia Warsaw | 3–2 | Wisła Kraków | Warsaw |
| 17:30 CET (UTC+1) | Nawrot 19', 47'; Łysakowski 74' | Report | Obtułowicz 85' (pen.); Woźniak 87' | Stadium: Stadion Wojska Polskiego; Attendance: 2,000; Referee: Emil Dobrzański (Siedlce) |

| 8 July 1934 11 | Garbarnia Kraków | 3–0 | Wisła Kraków | Kraków |
| | K. Pazurek 18', 47'; Riesner 61' | Report | | Stadium: Stadion Garbarni; Attendance: 1,000; Referee: Oskar Kurzweil (Lwów) |

| 5 August 1934 12 | Wisła Kraków | 8–0 | WKS 22 PP Siedlce | Kraków |
| 11:15 CET (UTC+1) | Woźniak 10', 62' (pen.); Obtułowicz 23', 27', 72'; Habowski 48'; Łyko 58'; Sołtysik 82' | Report | | Stadium: Stadion Wisły; Attendance: 500; Referee: Jan Laband (Katowice) |

| 2 September 1934 13 | Wisła Kraków | 2–1 | Ruch Hajduki Wielkie | Kraków |
| 16:00 CET (UTC+1) | W. Szumilas 44'; Woźniak 79'; Habowski (red card) 86' | Report | Peterek 85'; Katzy (red card) 86' | Stadium: Stadion Wisły; Attendance: 4,000; Referee: Wawrzyniec Staliński (Poznań) |

| 16 September 1934 14 | Polonia Warsaw | 4–5 | Wisła Kraków | Warsaw |
| | Pychowski 6' (o.g.); Łańko 33'; Bańkowski 67'; Herisch 81' | Report | Woźniak 4'; Balcer 22', 75'; Kopeć 57', 78' | Attendance: 2,500; Referee: Maksymilian Schneider (Kraków) |

| 23 September 1934 15 | Wisła Kraków | 3–2 | KS Warszawianka | Kraków |
| 15:15 CET (UTC+1) | Obtułowicz 7', 46' (pen.); Habowski 40' | Report | Piliszek 22', 35' | Stadium: Stadion Wisły; Attendance: 1,000; Referee: Eugeniusz Kochanek (Kraków) |

| 30 September 1934 16 | Wisła Kraków | 1–0 | Podgórze Kraków | Kraków |
| 15:00 CET (UTC+1) | Woźniak 15' | Report | | Stadium: Stadion Wisły; Attendance: 2,000; Referee: Oskar Kurzweil (Lwów) |

| 7 October 1934 17 | Wisła Kraków | 1–3 | Garbarnia Kraków | Kraków |
| 14:30 CET (UTC+1) | Obtułowicz 32' | Report | Riesner 19'; K. Pazurek 89'; Joksch 90' (pen.) | Stadium: Stadion Wisły; Attendance: 3,000; Referee: Mieczysław Walczak (Łódź) |

| 21 October 1934 18 | Wisła Kraków | 3–2 | Legia Warsaw | Kraków |
| 11:30 CET (UTC+1) | Balcer 40'; Sołtysik 43'; Kopeć 75' | Report | Przeździecki 3', 55' | Stadium: Stadion Wisły; Attendance: 3,000; Referee: Alfons Raettig (Łódź) |

| 28 October 1934 19 | ŁKS Łódź | 2–4 | Wisła Kraków | Łódź |
| 11:30 CET (UTC+1) | Tadeusiewicz 21'; Herbstreit 34' | Report | Balcer 27', 78', 80'; Woźniak 88' | Stadium: Stadion ŁKS-u; Attendance: 2,500; Referee: Jan Stronczek (Świętochłowice) |

| 4 November 1934 20 | Wisła Kraków | 5–0 | KS Cracovia | Kraków |
| 11:30 CET (UTC+1) | Habowski 48'; Woźniak 56', 90'; Kopeć 68', 83' | Report | | Stadium: Stadion Wisły; Attendance: 3,000; Referee: Łukasz Gruszka (Chorzów) |

| 11 November 1934 21 | Pogoń Lwów | 1–0 (3–0 w.o.) | Wisła Kraków | Lwów |
| 13:15 CET (UTC+1) | Niechcioł (penalty missed) 26'; Wasiewicz 75' | Report | Feret (red card) 85' | Stadium: Stadion Pogoni; Attendance: 2,000; Referee: Stefan Glinka (Warsaw) |
Note: Match abandoned after 85 minutes

| 18 November 1934 22 | Warta Poznań | 1–2 | Wisła Kraków | Poznań |
| 11:15 CET (UTC+1) | Scherfke 6' | Report | Balcer 27'; Kopeć 51' | Stadium: Stadion Warty; Attendance: 3,000; Referee: Franciszek Krukowski (Warsaw) |

== Squad, appearances and goals ==
| No. | Pos | Nat | Player | Total | | I Liga | |
| No. | Pos | Nat | Player | Apps | Goals | Apps | Goals |
|---|---|---|---|---|---|---|---|
| | GK | (Poland) POL | Stanisław Geruli | 4 | 0 | 2+2 | 0 |
| | GK | (Poland) POL | Maksymilian Koźmin | 10 | 0 | 10+0 | 0 |
| | GK | (Poland) POL | Edward Madejski | 10 | 0 | 10+0 | 0 |
| | GK | (Poland) POL | Zbigniew Olewski | 1 | 0 | 0+1 | 0 |
| | DF | (Poland) POL | Eugeniusz Oleksik | 3 | 0 | 3+0 | 0 |
| | DF | (Poland) POL | Aleksander Pychowski | 14 | 0 | 14+0 | 0 |
| | DF | (Poland) POL | Władysław Szumilas | 22 | 1 | 22+0 | 1 |
| | DF | (Poland) POL | Andrzej Woźniak | 2 | 0 | 2+0 | 0 |
| | MF | (Poland) POL | Karol Bajorek | 11 | 0 | 11+0 | 0 |
| | MF | (Poland) POL | Bolesław Habowski | 10 | 3 | 10+0 | 3 |
| | MF | (Poland) POL | Mieczysław Jezierski | 14 | 0 | 14+0 | 0 |
| | MF | (Poland) POL | Piotr Jędrzejczyk | 1 | 0 | 1+0 | 0 |
| | MF | (Poland) POL | Jan Kotlarczyk | 19 | 0 | 19+0 | 0 |
| | MF | (Poland) POL | Józef Kotlarczyk | 20 | 0 | 20+0 | 0 |
| | MF | (Poland) POL | Marian Sawicki | 1 | 0 | 1+0 | 0 |
| | FW | (Poland) POL | Mieczysław Balcer | 8 | 7 | 8+0 | 7 |
| | FW | (Poland) POL | Eugeniusz Feret | 8 | 0 | 8+0 | 0 |
| | FW | (Poland) POL | Henryk Kopeć | 9 | 6 | 9+0 | 6 |
| | FW | (Poland) POL | Stefan Lubowiecki | 5 | 1 | 5+0 | 1 |
| | FW | (Poland) POL | Antoni Łyko | 17 | 5 | 17+0 | 5 |
| | FW | (Poland) POL | Stanisław Obtułowicz | 16 | 12 | 16+0 | 12 |
| | FW | (Poland) POL | Jerzy Pazurek | 5 | 1 | 5+0 | 1 |
| | FW | (Poland) POL | Jan Reyman | 9 | 3 | 9+0 | 3 |
| | FW | (Poland) POL | Kazimierz Sołtysik | 10 | 3 | 10+0 | 3 |
| | FW | (Poland) POL | Artur Woźniak | 18 | 12 | 18+0 | 12 |

=== Goalscorers ===
| Place | Position | Nation | Name | I Liga |
|---|---|---|---|---|
| 1 | FW | (Poland) | Stanisław Obtułowicz | 12 |
| 1 | FW | (Poland) | Artur Woźniak | 12 |
| 3 | FW | (Poland) | Mieczysław Balcer | 7 |
| 4 | FW | (Poland) | Henryk Kopeć | 6 |
| 5 | FW | (Poland) | Antoni Łyko | 5 |
| 6 | FW | (Poland) | Jan Reyman | 3 |
| 6 | FW | (Poland) | Kazimierz Sołtysik | 3 |
| 6 | FW | (Poland) | Bolesław Habowski | 3 |
| 9 | DF | (Poland) | Władysław Szumilas | 1 |
| 9 | FW | (Poland) | Stefan Lubowiecki | 1 |
| 9 | FW | (Poland) | Jerzy Pazurek | 1 |
| | | | Total | 54 |

=== Disciplinary record ===
| Name | Nation | Position | Ekstraklasa | Total |
| Name | Nation | Position | Sent off (straight red) | Sent off (straight red) |
| Eugeniusz Feret | (Poland) | FW | 1 | 1 |
| Bolesław Habowski | (Poland) | MF | 1 | 1 |
