= 1937 Wisła Kraków season =

Wisła Kraków
1937 season
- Chairman: Tadeusz Orzelski
- Ekstraklasa: 5th
- Top goalscorer: Artur Woźniak (12 goals)

The 1937 season was Wisła Kraków's 29th year as a club.

== Friendlies ==
21 February 1937	Wisła Kraków (Poland)	8–1	(Poland) Łobzowianka Łobzów	Kraków, Poland
15:00 CET (UTC+1)	Szewczyk; Woźniak; Habowski (pen.)	Report	Wykusz	Stadium: Stadion Wisły

28 February 1937	Korona Kraków (Poland)	1–4	(Poland) Wisła Kraków	Kraków, Poland
11:00 CET (UTC+1)	Szary	Report	Szewczyk; Woźniak	Stadium: Boisko Korony

7 March 1937	Wisła Kraków (Poland)	5–3	(Poland) Naprzód Lipiny	Kraków, Poland
11:30 CET (UTC+1)	Szewczyk 5'; Habowski (??), 65'; Woźniak 45', 89'	Report	Bochnia	Stadium: Stadion Wisły; Attendance: 800; Referee: Zygmunt Chruściński (Kraków)

28 March 1937	Wisła Kraków (Poland)	0–1	(Hungary) Nemzeti SC	Kraków, Poland
15:30 CET (UTC+1)		Report	Kisalagi	Stadium: Stadion Wisły; Attendance: 3,000; Referee: Zdzisław Skowroński (Kraków)

17 May 1937	Wisła Kraków (Poland)	2–3	(Poland) Podgórze Kraków	Kraków, Poland
17:00 CET (UTC+1)	Woźniak; Szewczyk	Report	Hodór; Antosiewicz	Stadium: Stadion Wisły

12 June 1937	SV Fortuna Leipzig (Nazi Germany)	2–3	(Poland) Wisła Kraków	Poznań, Poland
18:30 CET (UTC+1)	Körner; Obst	Report	Gracz; Habowski; Łyko (pen.)	Stadium: Stadion Warty

13 June 1937	Warta Poznań (Poland)	5–1	(Poland) Wisła Kraków	Poznań, Poland
18:20 CET (UTC+1)	Słomiak 2'; Kazimierczak (??); F. Scherfke 63' (pen.), 77'; Gendera 74'	Report	Woźniak 90'	Stadium: Stadion Warty; Attendance: 3,000; Referee: Roman Dabert (Poznań)

18 July 1937	Turyści Częstochowa (Poland)	4–6	(Poland) Wisła Kraków	Częstochowa, Poland
	Matuszewski; Siwek; Szczepański	Report	Woźniak; Gracz; Sołtysik; Kammer

25 July 1937	Czarni Radom (Poland)	0–2	(Poland) Wisła Kraków	Radom, Poland
		Report	Woźniak; Gracz	Attendance: 2,000

8 August 1937	Wisła Kraków (Poland)	3–3	(Poland) Concordia Knurów	Kraków, Poland
15:15 CET (UTC+1)	Obtułowicz 30'; Gracz 65'; Natanek 70'	Report	Sędzielarz 36', 89'; Helduk (??)	Stadium: Stadion Wisły; Attendance: 800

15 August 1937	Wisła Kraków (Poland)	6–1	(Poland) Olsza Kraków	Kraków, Poland
11:00 CET (UTC+1)	Woźniak; Gracz	Report	Michalak	Stadium: Stadion Wisły

21 August 1937	Wisła Kraków (Poland)	10–0	(Poland) Krowodrza Kraków	Kraków, Poland
		Report

22 August 1937	Wisła Kraków (Poland)	10–1	(Poland) Podgórze Kraków	Kraków, Poland
11:15 CET (UTC+1)	Szewczyk; Gracz; Woźniak	Report	Kasina	Stadium: Stadion Wisły

11 November 1937	Wisła Kraków (Poland)	3–2	(Poland) Kraków	Kraków, Poland
14:30 CET (UTC+1)	Łyko 60' (pen.); Gracz 64'; Ogrodziński 76'	Report	Antosiewicz 7'; Kasina 17'	Stadium: Stadion Wisły; Attendance: 300; Referee: Roman Berwald (Kraków)

== Ekstraklasa ==
4 April 1937 1	Wisła Kraków	5–0	KS Warszawianka	Kraków
16:15 CET (UTC+1)	Woźniak 29', 41', 76'; Gracz 84'; Łyko 86'	Report		Stadium: Stadion Wisły; Attendance: 3,000; Referee: Alfons Raettig (Łódź)

11 April 1937 2	Wisła Kraków	6–2	ŁKS Łódź	Kraków
16:15 CET (UTC+1)	Gracz 35', 74'; Habowski 51'; Szewczyk 61'; Woźniak 73'; Łyko 77'	Report	Lewandowski 26', 65'	Stadium: Stadion Wisły; Attendance: 4,000; Referee: Mieczysław Walczak (Warsaw)

18 April 1937 3	Ruch Hajduki Wielkie	1–0	Wisła Kraków	Hajduki Wielkie
16:30 CET (UTC+1)	Wilimowski 80'	Report		Stadium: Stadion Ruchu; Attendance: 10,000; Referee: Kazimierz Wardęszkiewicz (Łódź)

25 April 1937 4	Wisła Kraków	2–0	Pogoń Lwów	Kraków
16:30 CET (UTC+1)	Łyko 8'; Gracz 77'	Report		Stadium: Stadion Wisły; Attendance: 3,000; Referee: Wawrzyniec Staliński (Poznań)

6 May 1937 5	Wisła Kraków	1–1	Garbarnia Kraków	Kraków
15:15 CET (UTC+1)	Łyko 63'	Report	Woźniak 62'	Stadium: Stadion Wisły; Attendance: 3,000; Referee: Arnold Haussmann (Lwów)

27 May 1937 6	Wisła Kraków	1–1	KS Cracovia	Kraków
17:30 CET (UTC+1)	Habowski 58'	Report	Zieliński 87'	Stadium: Stadion Wisły; Attendance: 7,000; Referee: Michał Frank (Wilno)

6 June 1937 7	AKS Chorzów	4–2	Wisła Kraków	Chorzów
17:30 CET (UTC+1)	Piątek 2', 30', 78'; Pochopień 77'	Report	Woźniak 58'; Gracz 90'	Stadium: Boisko AKS-u; Attendance: 5,000; Referee: Zygmunt Lange (Łódź)

27 June 1937 8	Wisła Kraków	2–0	Warta Poznań	Kraków
17:45 CET (UTC+1)	Woźniak 62'; Łyko 67'	Report		Stadium: Stadion Wisły; Attendance: 2,500; Referee: Alfons Raettig (Łódź)

29 August 1937 9	KS Warszawianka	1–2	Wisła Kraków	Warsaw
	Knioła 12'	Report	Woźniak 29', 53'	Stadium: Stadion Wojska Polskiego; Attendance: 3,000; Referee: Kazimierz Wardęszkiewicz (Łódź)

5 September 1937 10	KS Cracovia	1–0	Wisła Kraków	Kraków
16:15 CET (UTC+1)	Zembaczyński 60'	Report		Stadium: Stadion Cracovii; Attendance: 8,000; Referee: Zygmunt Lange (Łódź)

19 September 1937 11	Wisła Kraków	2–2	Ruch Hajduki Wielkie	Kraków
15:45 CET (UTC+1)	Łyko 63'; Habowski 75'	Report	Peterek (penalty missed) 5'; Wodarz 9'; Wiechoczek 40'	Stadium: Stadion Wisły; Attendance: 6,000; Referee: Franciszek Krukowski (Warsaw)

26 September 1937 12	Garbarnia Kraków	2–0	Wisła Kraków	Kraków
15:30 CET (UTC+1)	Skóra 39'; K. Pazurek 62'	Report		Stadium: Stadion Garbarni; Attendance: 2,500; Referee: Paweł Kosek (Siemianowice)

3 October 1937 13	Warta Poznań	3–2	Wisła Kraków	Poznań
15:00 CET (UTC+1)	Kaźmierczak 16'; Lis 28', 32'; Nawrat (penalty missed) 32'	Report	Woźniak 6', 82'	Stadium: Stadion Warty; Attendance: 2,500; Referee: Alfons Raettig (Łódź)

17 October 1937 14	ŁKS Łódź	2–0	Wisła Kraków	Łódź
14:30 CET (UTC+1)	Herbstreit 15'; Koczewski 67'	Report		Stadium: Stadion ŁKS-u; Attendance: 3,000; Referee: Wawrzyniec Staliński (Poznań)

24 October 1937 15	Pogoń Lwów	1–0	Wisła Kraków	Lwów
	Zimmer 23'	Report		Stadium: Stadion Pogoni; Attendance: 5,000; Referee: Zygmunt Lange (Łódź)

14 November 1937 16	Wisła Kraków	5–2	AKS Chorzów	Kraków
12:00 CET (UTC+1)	Łyko 43'; Woźniak 55', 58'; Ogrodziński 66'; Knas 89' (o.g.)	Report	Wostal 47'; Piątek 71' (pen.)	Stadium: Stadion Wisły; Attendance: 5,000; Referee: Oskar Kurzweil (Lwów)

17	Wisła Kraków	3–0 (w.o.)	Dąb Katowice
		Report

18	Dąb Katowice	0–3 (w.o.)	Wisła Kraków
		Report

== Squad, appearances and goals ==
No.	Pos	Nat	Player	Total		I Liga	
No.	Pos	Nat	Player	Apps	Goals	Apps	Goals
	GK	(Poland) POL	Jerzy Jurowicz	1	0	0+1	0
	GK	(Poland) POL	Edward Madejski	16	0	16+0	0
	DF	(Poland) POL	Alojzy Sitko	16	0	16+0	0
	DF	(Poland) POL	Władysław Szumilas	16	0	16+0	0
	MF	(Poland) POL	Włodzimierz Czak	1	0	1+0	0
	MF	(Poland) POL	Antoni Fujarski	1	0	1+0	0
	MF	(Poland) POL	Franciszek Gierczyński	13	0	13+0	0
	MF	(Poland) POL	Mieczysław Jezierski	12	0	12+0	0
	MF	(Poland) POL	Władysław Kammer	4	0	4+0	0
	MF	(Poland) POL	Józef Kotlarczyk	16	0	16+0	0
	MF	(Poland) POL	Stanisław Waga	1	0	1+0	0
	FW	(Poland) POL	Mieczysław Gracz	15	5	15+0	5
	FW	(Poland) POL	Bolesław Habowski	16	3	16+0	3
	FW	(Poland) POL	Antoni Łyko	16	7	16+0	7
	FW	(Poland) POL	Kazimierz Obtułowicz	1	0	1+0	0
	FW	(Poland) POL	Antoni Ogrodziński	1	1	1+0	1
	FW	(Poland) POL	Kazimierz Sołtysik	3	0	3+0	0
	FW	(Poland) POL	Władysław Szewczyk	13	1	13+0	1
	FW	(Poland) POL	Artur Woźniak	15	12	15+0	12

=== Goalscorers ===
Place	Position	Nation	Name	I Liga
1	FW	(Poland)	Artur Woźniak	12
2	FW	(Poland)	Antoni Łyko	7
3	FW	(Poland)	Mieczysław Gracz	5
4	FW	(Poland)	Bolesław Habowski	3
5	FW	(Poland)	Antoni Ogrodziński	1
5	FW	(Poland)	Władysław Szewczyk	1
			Total	29
