= Edward Miller =

Edward, Ed, or Ted, or Eddie Miller may refer to:

== Arts and entertainment ==
- Ed Miller (Scottish folk musician), Scottish folk singer
- Eddie Miller (jazz saxophonist) (1911–1991), jazz musician
- Eddie "Piano" Miller, piano player and bandleader, also known as Edward Lisbona (1905–1989)
- Eddie "The Bombardier" Miller, radio talk show host, see The Political Cesspool
- Eddie Miller (songwriter) (1919–1977), American songwriter in the country music genre
- Edward Miller (musician) (1735–1807), English organist and composer
- Edward Miller (playwright), American actor, playwright, and producer
- Edward Miller (born 1949), pseudonym of British fantasy, science fiction and horror illustrator Les Edwards

== Politics ==
- Edward Allan Miller (born 1942), Canadian politician
- Edward Blake Miller, Canadian politician
- Edward B. Miller (born 1971), deputy chief of staff to Maryland governor Robert Ehrlich
- Edward E. Miller (1880–1946), U.S. representative from Illinois
- Edward G. Miller Jr. (1911–1968), U.S. assistant secretary of state for inter-American affairs
- Edward Tylor Miller (1895–1968), U.S. Army officer and later U.S. representative from Maryland
- Ed Miller (Kentucky politician) (1931–2005), member of the Kentucky Senate

== Sports ==
=== Association football ===
- Eddie Miller (footballer, born 1917) (1917–1940), English footballer, winger for Gateshead
- Eddie Miller (footballer, born 1920) (1920–2002), English footballer, inside forward for Barrow
- Edward Miller (footballer) (1908–1965), Polish footballer

=== Baseball ===
- Ed Miller (first baseman) (1888–1980), Major League Baseball first baseman
- Ed Miller (outfielder), American Association professional baseball player
- Eddie Miller (infielder) (1916–1997), baseball shortstop
- Eddie Miller (outfielder) (born 1957), retired Major League Baseball player
- Eddie Miller (pitcher) (1902–?), American Negro league baseball player

=== Other sports ===
- Eddie Miller (basketball) (1931–2014), American basketball player
- Eddie Miller (quarterback) (1916–2000), American football quarterback
- Eddie Miller (racing driver, born 1895) (1895–1965), American race car driver
- Eddie Miller (racing driver, born 1945) (1945–2021), American race car driver from Colorado
- Eddie Miller (wide receiver) (born 1969), American football wide receiver
- Ted Miller (sprinter) (born c. 1905), 1925 All-American sprinter for the Stanford Cardinal track and field team

== Other ==
- Ed Miller (poker player) (born 1979), American professional poker player and poker authority
- Eddie Miller, known as Bozo Miller, competitive eater
- Edward Miller (historian) (1915–2000), historian and master of Fitzwilliam College, Cambridge
- Edward Miller (priest) (1854–1951), Anglican archdeacon of Colombo
- Edward D. Miller (born 1943), dean and CEO of Johns Hopkins Medicine
- Edward J. Miller (USMC) (1922–1993), United States Marine Corps general
- Edward J. Miller (warden) (1899–?), American prison administrator
- Edward M. Miller (born 1944), American economist and intelligence researcher
- Edward Miller (pirate) (fl. 1717–1720), English pirate active in the Caribbean
- Edward S. Miller (1923–2013), former FBI agent
- Edward T. Miller (outlaw) (1856–1881), outlaw who rode with Jesse James and also was killed by him

== See also ==
- Edward Alexander Millar (1860–1934), U.S. Army general
- Ted Millar (1918–2008), Australian rules footballer
