= Football Junior Championships of Poland =

Football Junior Championships of Poland Under-19 (Polish: Mistrzostwa Polski juniorow w pilce noznej) is a competition which started in the summer of 1936.

== 1936 ==
The first, historic Under-19 tournament for the title of the Football Junior Championships of Poland took place in the town of Sieraków, in mid-August 1936. Invited were junior champions of all 12 regional districts of Polish Football Association (PZPN), but for unknown reasons three teams did not show up. These were champions of Wilno, Volhynia and Lublin.

Thus, there were 9 teams, but this uneven number was further reduced to 8, after Gryf Toruń (champion of Pomerania) beat Brygada Częstochowa (champion of Zagłębie Dąbrowskie) 5-1 (3-0). Finally, in Sieraków there were these teams:

- Warta Poznań (junior champion of Poznań),
- Lechia Lwów (originally, Pogoń Lwów had won regional junior championships, but it turned out that one of Pogon's players was too old, thus the whole team was disqualified and replaced by Lechia),
- HKS Szopienice (original champions of Upper Silesia, the junior team of Ruch Chorzów, was disqualified for unknown reasons),
- Polonia Warszawa (junior champion of Warsaw),
- Wisła Kraków (junior champion of Kraków),
- Rewera Stanisławów (junior champion of Stanisławów),
- Widzew Łódź (junior champion of Łódź),
- Gryf Toruń (junior champion of Pomerania).

=== First round ===
- Warta Poznań - Lechia Lwów 2–0,
- HKS Szopienice - Polonia Warszawa 3–0,
- Wisła Kraków - Rewera Stanisławów 4–2,
- Widzew Łódź - Gryf Toruń 2–1.

=== Second round ===
- Warta Poznań - Widzew Łódź 3-0 (3-0),
- Wisła Kraków - HKS Szopienice 5-1 (4-0).

=== Final ===
- Wisła Kraków - Warta Poznań 3–0.

CHAMPION - WISLA KRAKOW

== 1937 ==
Second Junior Championships of Poland took place in Kozienice, in mid-August 1937. As many as 17 teams were invited to the competition, these were:

- Wisła Kraków (with Jerzy Jurowicz,
- Cracovia,
- Warta Poznań,
- KPW Poznań (with Edmund Białas),
- Pogoń Lwów (with Adam Wolanin, Piotr Dreher and Stanislaw Szmyd),
- Ruch Chorzów (with Walter Brom),
- Naprzód Lipiny,
- Polonia Bydgoszcz,
- Rewera Stanisławów,
- Śmigły Wilno,
- PWATT Warszawa,
- Hasmonea Rowne,
- Gryf Toruń,
- Widzew Łódź,
- CKS Czeladź,
- WKS Grodno,
- Unia Lublin.

=== First round ===
- Wisła Kraków - Ruch Chorzów 6–0,
- Pogoń Lwów - Naprzód Lipiny 4–0,
- PWATT Warszawa - CKS Czeladź 4–0,
- Rewera Stanisławów - Śmigły Wilno 2–1,
- KPW Poznań - Cracovia 0-0 (penalties 4–2),
- Widzew Łódź - Unia Lublin 3–1,
- WKS Grodno - Polonia Bydgoszcz 2-2 (penalties 2–1),
- Warta Poznań - Hasmonea Rowne 2-2 (penalties 2–1).

=== Second round ===
- Wisła Kraków - PWATT Warszawa 2–0,
- KPW Poznań - WKS Grodno 4–0,
- Pogoń Lwów - Rewera Stanisławów 4–1,
- Widzew Łódź - Warta Poznań 3–2.

=== Semifinals ===
- Pogoń Lwów - Widzew Łódź 6-1
- Katowice, Sunday, October 10. Wisła Kraków - KPW Poznań 2–1.

=== Final ===
- Warsaw, November 14, 1937. Wisła Kraków - Pogoń Lwów 1-0 (1-0).

CHAMPION - WISLA KRAKOW

== 1938 ==
The third competition took place in August 1938 in Sieraków. Ten junior teams, representing ten districts of PZPN showed up. These were:

- AKS Chorzów,
- PWATT Warszawa,
- Widzew Łódź,
- Czarni Sosnowiec,
- Lechia Lwów,
- Pogon Równe,
- Warta Poznań,
- Wisła Kraków,
- WKS Grodno,
- Unia Lublin.

Final game of the Championships took place a year later, on June 4, 1939, in Warsaw, right before an international friendly Poland - Switzerland.

- Unia Lublin - Wisła Kraków 3-2 (0-1).

CHAMPION - UNIA LUBLIN

== 1939 ==
No championships were organized.

== 1953 ==
After 15 years, the idea of Junior Championships of Poland returned. The final tournament took place in mid-August 1953 in Świdnica, with 8 teams: Pomorzanin Toruń, ŁKS Łódź, Darzbor Szczecinek, Pogoń Szczecin, Budowlani Lublin, Resovia Rzeszów, Odra Opole and Unia Szamotuły. In the first game, Pomorzanin beat Unia Szamotuły 4–2. Then they beat Odra Opole 3-2 and Resovia Rzeszów 3–0. In the second round Pomorzanin tied 1–1 with Darzbor Szczecinek and beat Resovia 3-0 and ŁKS Łódź 1–0. Thus, Toruń's side became the champion, second was ŁKS Łódź, third - Resovia and fourth - Darzbor.

CHAMPION - POMORZANIN TORUN

== 1954 ==
In June 1954, junior team of Unia Racibórz became the Champion of Opole Voivodeship and later - beat 3-2 the champion of Lower Silesia, Polonia Świdnica.

Finally, in mid-July, there were central Championships, in Wrocław, in which participated 8 teams (Legia Warszawa, Pogoń Szczecin, Resovia Rzeszów, Wisła Kraków, Unia Racibórz, Pomorzanin Toruń, ŁKS Łódź, Szombierki Bytom). Unia Racibórz beat Resovia Rzeszów 3–0, Pogoń Szczecin 5–0, ŁKS Łódź 2–1, Szombierki Bytom 3-0 and 2-0 Gwardia Kraków. Even though Racibórz's young players lost 0–4 to Legia Warszawa, they were the Champions of Poland, due to the 5–0 victory with Pomorzanin Toruń in the last game. finishing the competition ahead of Szombierki Bytom, Gwardia Kraków and Legia Warszawa.

CHAMPION - UNIA RACIBÓRZ

== 1955 ==
In the final competition, which took place in mid-August 1955 in Wrocław, there were four teams - Garbarnia Kraków, Start Chorzów, Start Rymanow and ŁKS Łódź. The tournament was won by Start Chorzów, second was ŁKS Łódź, third - Garbarnia. Fourth was the team from Rymanow.

Even though Start Rymanow was the last, it was a surprise for the whole country. Ambitious team from a small town in the south Poland on the way to the finals first became champion of Rzeszów Voivodeship, then beat Lublinianka Lublin 4–3, 1-1 and Legia Warszawa 4–2, 1–2.

On the way to the top, Chorzów's boys beat Rymanow 5–1, LKS 2-1 and Garbarnia 3–1.

CHAMPION - START CHORZOW

== 1956 ==
CHAMPION - UNIA RACIBÓRZ

More information about the tournament is not available. It has only been established that Polonia Bytom was second and Arka Gdynia third.

== 1957 ==
In the final game of the championships, Lechia Gdańsk beat in Zielona Góra the team of Karpaty Krosno 2–1. Karpaty, on the way to the final, had beaten Dabski Kraków (2-0, 2–0), Victoria Częstochowa (2-1, 1–0) and Sleza Wrocław (1-0). Third and fourth teams of the competition were Sleza Wrocław and Lechia Tomaszów Mazowiecki.

CHAMPION - LECHIA GDANSK

== 1958 ==
In the final game of the championships, Wisła Kraków beat 3-0 Zawisza Bydgoszcz. The match took place on September 14, 1958, at the Silesian Stadium in Chorzów, just before an international friendly Poland - Hungary (1-3) and was watched by some 80,000 fans.

CHAMPION - WISLA KRAKOW

== 1959 ==
In the final game, which took place in Warsaw, just before an international friendly Poland - Romania 2-3 (August 30, 1959), the junior team of Cracovia beat Arka Gdynia 3–0.

CHAMPION - CRACOVIA KRAKOW

== 1960 ==
CHAMPION - ZRYW CHORZOW

More information about the tournament is not available.

== 1961 ==
In the final game, at Chorzów's Silesian Stadium, Zryw Chorzów routed Gornik Wałbrzych 10–1. Among most famous Zryw's players, there are such personalities as Antoni Piechniczek, Zygfryd Szołtysik and Jan Banaś. This game took place on September 13, 1961, right before the Górnik Zabrze - Tottenham Hotspur 4-2 match.

CHAMPION - ZRYW CHORZOW

== 1962 ==
CHAMPION - LKS LODZ

More information about the tournament is not available. It has only been established that the Under-19 team of Legia Warszawa was second.

== 1963 ==
CHAMPION - POLONIA BYTOM

More information about the tournament is not available. Second was Zagłębie Sosnowiec, third - probably Wisła Kraków.

== 1964 ==
The final tournament took place in Mielec. The decisive game, between Arkonia Szczecin and Stal Mielec ended in a 2–2 tie. The referee decided to toss a coin and thus Arkonia became the champion.

CHAMPION - ARKONIA SZCZECIN

== 1965 ==
CHAMPION - RUCH CHORZOW

More information about the tournament is not available. It has only been established that the Under-19 team of Pogoń Szczecin was second.

== 1966 ==
Final tournament took place in August 1966 in Łódź. Local team, Hala, was first, second was Cracovia Kraków, third - Zryw Chorzów, fourth - Gwardia Warszawa. It has been established that Cracovia beat Zryw 2–1, Gwardia 5-1 and lost to Hala, but the result is unknown.

CHAMPION - MKS HALA LODZ

== 1967 ==
The final tournament took place in Olsztyn. Górnik Zabrze finished first, second was Warmia Olsztyn, third - Zawisza Bydgoszcz and fourth - Stadion Chorzów. For the first time both regular and junior championships of Poland were won by same club.

CHAMPION - GORNIK ZABRZE

== 1968 ==
The tournament took place in Mielec. Second was Odra Opole, third - Stal Mielec, fourth - Lechia Gdańsk. Results - Odra Opole - Gornik Wałbrzych 0–1, Odra - Stal Mielec 1–0, Odra - Lechia Gdańsk 3–0.

CHAMPION - GORNIK WALBRZYCH.

== 1969 ==
CHAMPION - LEGIA WARSZAWA.

More information about the tournament is not available. Second was Lublinianka Lublin, third - Stal Mielec.

== 1970 ==
The tournament took place in Kluczbork in late July 1970. Second was Metal Kluczbork, third - Motor Lublin, fourth - Lechia Gdańsk.

CHAMPION - POLONIA BYTOM

== 1971 ==
CHAMPION - MOTOR LUBLIN

More information about the tournament is not available. Second was ŁKS Łódź, third - Metal Kluczbork, fourth - Warta Poznań.

== 1972 ==
The tournament took place in Kraśnik in the summer of 1972. First was Odra Opole, second - Stal Kraśnik, third Hutnik Kraków, fourth - Zawisza Bydgoszcz. Odra was by far the best team of the competition, beating all opponents (Stal 2–1, Hutnik 3–1, Zawisza 4–0).

CHAMPION - ODRA OPOLE

== 1973 ==
The tournament took place in Wałbrzych in the summer of 1972. First was Gornik Wałbrzych, which beat the teams of ŁKS Łódź, Chemik Kedzierzyn and Ruch Chorzów Gornik was by far the best team of the competition, beating two opponents and drawing one game.

CHAMPION - GORNIK WALBRZYCH

== 1974 ==
Final game of the Championships took place on August 11, 1974, in Warsaw, right before the Cup of Poland final (Ruch Chorzów - Gwardia Warszawa 2–0). Stomil Olsztyn proved its quality over the favorites - the junior team of Szombierki Bytom, winning 2–0.

On the way to the final, Stomil U-19 team won a tournament in Łódź, beating Łódź ianka Łódź 4:0, Gwardia Koszalin 3:0 and drawing 0–0 with Stal Mielec. Then, in the quarterfinals, Stomil twice beat Star Starachowice - 3–1 away and 2–0 at home.

CHAMPION - STOMIL OLSZTYN

== 1975 ==
That year, the junior team of Wisła Kraków proved its quality, beating Warta Poznań. However, more information about the championships is no available.

CHAMPION - WISLA KRAKOW

== 1976 ==
In the final game, the U-19 team of Wisła Kraków beat Odra Opole in Kraków 5–1. Wisla was by far the best junior team of the country, with such excellent players as Adam Nawałka, Leszek Lipka, Andrzej Iwan, Michal Wrobel or Krzysztof Budka. Odra also had a player who made an international career, this was Roman Wójcicki.

CHAMPION - WISLA KRAKOW

== 1977 ==
More information about the tournament is not available. It has only been established that Śląsk Wrocław was second.

CHAMPION - POLONIA WARSZAWA

== 1978 ==
More information about the tournament is not available. It has only been established that Gwardia Warszawa was second and Śląsk Wrocław third.

CHAMPION - POLONIA BYTOM

== 1979 ==
In the final game in the summer of 1979, U-19 team of Śląsk Wrocław beat 2-1 Siarka Tarnobrzeg.

CHAMPION - SLASK WROCLAW

== 1980 ==
Final game took place in Toruń. U-19 team of Polonia Bydgoszcz beat BKS Stal Bielsko-Biała 2-0 (1-0), thus becoming the champion.

CHAMPION - POLONIA BYDGOSZCZ

== 1981 ==
Final game took place in Grudziądz. U-19 team of Zawisza Bydgoszcz beat Odra Opole 2-1 (2-0), thus becoming the champion.

CHAMPION - ZAWISZA BYDGOSZCZ

== 1982 ==
CHAMPION - WISLA KRAKOW

More information about the tournament is not available.

== 1983 ==
CHAMPION - LKS LODZ

More information about the tournament is not available.

== 1984 ==
CHAMPION - RUCH CHORZOW

More information about the tournament is not available. It has only been established that third was the junior team of Odra Opole, which twice played with Widzew Łódź. In the first game Widzew won 1–0, but in the second leg Odra beat their opponent 2–0.

== 1985 ==
In the final game, Hutnik Kraków U-19 beat young players of Górnik Zabrze. Among Hutnik's players there were: Krzysztof Bukalski, Marek Koźmiński and Mirosław Waligóra.

== 1986 ==
CHAMPION - POGON SZCZECIN

More information about the tournament is not available. Second was Zawisza Bydgoszcz.

== 1987 ==
CHAMPION - LECH POZNAN

More information about the tournament is not available.

== 1988 ==
CHAMPION - JAGIELLONIA BIALYSTOK

More information about the tournament is not available. Hutnik Kraków was third.

== 1989 ==
CHAMPION - GORNIK ZABRZE.

More information about the tournament is not available. Legia Warszawa was second, Radomiak Radom - third.

== 1990 ==
In the final games, junior team of Cracovia twice beat Lechia Gdańsk, 1–0 in Kraków (July 8, 1990) and 2–1 in Gdańsk (July 13, 1990). On the way to the final, Cracovia's U-19 team played quarter-final tournament in Kraków, in which it beat Chemik Police 1–0, ŁKS Łódź 4-1 and Zagłębie Lubin 4–2.

CHAMPION - CRACOVIA KRAKOW

== 1991 ==
In the final games, junior team of Cracovia beat Polonia Warszawa in Kraków 2-1 (July 14, 1991), in the second leg (Warsaw, July 18, 1991), Cracovia tied 1-1, thus becoming the champion for the second time in a row. Cracovia's best player in these games was Tomasz Rząsa.

On the way to the final games, Cracovia U-19 played a quarter-final tournament in Zabrze, beating Lechia Gdańsk 5–1, Górnik Zabrze 1-0 and Piast Nowa Ruda 3–1.

CHAMPION - CRACOVIA KRAKOW

== 1992 ==
In the final games, U-19 team of Jagiellonia Białystok twice routed Orzel Łódź 4-0 and 8–4. In Jagiellonia there was, among others, Marek Citko.

CHAMPION - JAGIELLONIA BIALYSTOK

== 1993 ==
CHAMPION - HUTNIK KRAKOW

Third was Jagiellonia Białystok, fourth - Odra Opole.

== 1994 ==
CHAMPION - HUTNIK KRAKOW

== 1995 ==
CHAMPION - LECH POZNAN

== 1996 ==
CHAMPION - WISLA KRAKOW

== 1997 ==
CHAMPION - WISLA KRAKOW

== 1998 ==
CHAMPION - ODRA WODZISLAW SLASKI

== 1999 ==
CHAMPION - LKS LODZ

== 2000 ==
CHAMPION - WISLA KRAKOW

== 2001 ==
Final tournament took place in early July 2001 in Wałbrzych. Four teams participated in the competition - LSPM Zielona Góra, Górnik Zabrze, Polonia Warszawa and Gornik Wałbrzych. The champion, the team of LSPM, beat all opponents - Górnik Zabrze 4–2, Gornik Wałbrzych 1-0 and Polonia 2–1. Second was Górnik Zabrze, third Polonia Warszawa, fourth Gornik Wałbrzych .

CHAMPION - Lubuska Szkola Pilkarstwa Mlodziezowego (LSPM) ZIELONA GORA

== 2002 ==
In the final tournament, in the summer of 2002, there were four teams - Amica Wronki, ŁKS Łódź, GKS Katowice and Górnik Łęczna. The champions, Amica, beat Gornik 6-2 and LKS 3-1 and tied 1–1 with GKS. Second was LKS, third GKS Katowice, fourth - Górnik Łęczna .

CHAMPION - AMICA WRONKI

== 2003 ==
Final tournament took place in mid-July 2003 in Łódź. There were four teams - Gwarek Zabrze, Wisła Płock, Amica Wronki and SMS Łódź . Gwarek's young players beat all opponents - Amica (2-1), Wisła Płock (4-3) and SMS (3-2). Second was Amica, third - SMS, fourth - Wisła Płock.

CHAMPION - GWAREK ZABRZE

== 2004 ==
Four teams qualified to the final tournament. These were: Jagiellonia Białystok, Gwarek Zabrze, Górnik Łęczna and Lechia Zielona Góra. Jagiellonia beat all opponents - Gwarek 3–1, Gornik 1-0 and Lechia 2–1. Second was Gwarek, third Gornik, fourth - Lechia Zielona Góra. CHAMPION - JAGIELLONIA BIALYSTOK

== 2005 ==
Final tournament took place in early July 2005 in Siemiatycze. To get there, the future champion won championships of the Łódź Voivodeship and then beat Zawisza Bydgoszcz 3-2 and 3–0. In the tournament there were 4 teams - SMS Łódź, Polonia Warszawa, Górnik Łęczna and Wisła Kraków. SMS beat Polonia 2-0 and Górnik Łęczna 4-2 and tied 1–1 with Wisla. Second was Polonia, third - Gornik, fourth - Wisła Kraków.

CHAMPION - UKS SMS LODZ

== 2006 ==
The junior team of Gwarek Zabrze, future champions of Poland, firstly won championships of the Silesian Voivodeship. Then, Gwarek's junior twice beat Odra Opole (4-2 and 4–0). Next step were games with Korona Kielce (8-1 and 0–2), and thus Gwarek qualified to the finals, which took place in early July 2006 in Ostrowiec Świętokrzyski. There were four teams in the tournament - Gwarek, Stal Mielec, Tomasovia Tomaszów Lubelski and Piast Białystok. Gwarek beat Tomasovia 2-0 and Stal 4-1 and tied with Piast 1-1, becoming the champion. Second was Tomasovia, third - Stal and fourth - Piast.

CHAMPION - GWAREK ZABRZE

== 2007 ==
Final tournament in the summer of 2007 gathered four teams: Amica Wronki, Stal Mielec, SMS Łódź and Zagłębie Lubin. Amica's juniors beat Stal 3-1 and Zaglebie 4-0 and tied 1–1 with SMS. Second was Stal, third - SMS and fourth - Zaglebie.

CHAMPION - AMICA WRONKI

== U-17 ==
There are Football Junior Championships of Poland Under-17 too.

- 1992 - Górnik Zabrze
- 1993 - Lechia Gdańsk
- 1994 - ŁKS Łódź
- 1995 - Lechia Gdańsk
- 1996 - Górnik Zabrze
- 1997 - Hutnik Kraków
- 1998 - Amica Wronki
- 1999 - ŁKS Łódź
- 2001 - Drukarz Warszawa
- 2002 - Gwarek Zabrze
- 2003 - Amica Wronki
- 2004 - Amica Wronki
- 2005 - UKS SMS Łódź
- 2006 - Cracovia
- 2007 - Stal Mielec

== Sources ==
- http://buwcd.buw.uw.edu.pl/e_zbiory/ckcp/p_sportowy/p_sportowy/start.htm
- http://www.90minut.pl
- http://www.ozpn.krosno.net.pl/!nowa/XXXlat.htm
- https://web.archive.org/web/20070927043053/http://strony.aster.pl/pietro/historia.pdf
