= Franciszek Cebulak =

Polish footballer (1906–1960)

Personal information
- Full name: Franciszek Ludwik Cebulak
- Date of birth: 16 September 1906
- Place of birth: Kraków, Austria-Hungary
- Date of death: 4 August 1960 (aged 53)
- Place of death: Warsaw, Poland
- Height: 1.68 m (5 ft 6 in)
- Position: Midfielder

Senior career*
Years	Team	Apps	(Gls)
–1923	Wisła Kraków		
1924	WKS Grodno		
1925–1926	1 pp Legionów Wilno		
1927–1933	Legia Warsaw	103	(1)
1934	Cracovia	7	(2)
1935–1936	Legia Warsaw	21	(1)
1937–1938	Warszawianka	24	(1)

International career
1931–1936	Poland	5	(0)
- * Club domestic league appearances and goals

Franciszek Ludwik Cebulak (16 September 1906 – 4 August 1960) was a Polish footballer who played as a midfielder, who represented the Poland national team at the 1936 Berlin Olympic Games.

Cebulak was born in Kraków, and started his career with Wisła Kraków, but his occupation as a professional soldier of the Polish Army forced him to change clubs on several occasions. He played for military clubs from Wilno and Grodno, eventually joining Legia Warsaw, where he played from 1927 until 1936. Then Cebulak moved to Warszawianka, where he ended his career in late 1938.

Playing for the Poland national team, Cebulak earned his first cap on 23 August 1931 against Romania. Altogether, he was capped five times for Poland, participating in the 1936 Olympic Games. He died in Warsaw.
