= 1954–55 Polska Liga Hokejowa season =

Polish ice hockey season

The 1954–55 Polska Liga Hokejowa season was the 20th season of the Polska Liga Hokejowa, the top level of ice hockey in Poland. Nine teams participated in the league, and KS Cracovia won the championship.

== First round ==
=== Group I ===
	Club
1.	Legia Warszawa
2.	KS Pomorzanin Toruń
3.	Gwardia Katowice
4.	Sparta Nowy Targ

=== Group II ===
	Club
1.	Górnik Katowice
2.	Gwardia Bydgoszcz
3.	KTH Krynica
4.	Sparta Cieszyn
5.	Wlókniarz Zgierz

== Second round ==
=== Final round ===
	Club	GP	Goals	Pts
1.	Legia Warszawa	3	24:6	6
2.	Gwardia Bydgoszcz	3	13:15	4
3.	Górnik Katowice	3	19:13	2
4.	KS Pomorzanin Toruń	3	6:28	0

=== 5th-8th place ===
	Club	GP	Goals	Pts
5.	Gwardia Katowice	3	11:8	4
6.	Sparta Nowy Targ	3	17:13	4
7.	KTH Krynica	3	8:11	2
8.	Sparta Cieszyn	3	13:17	2
