= 1953–54 Polska Liga Hokejowa season =

Polish ice hockey season

The 1953–54 Polska Liga Hokejowa season was the 19th season of the Polska Liga Hokejowa, the top level of ice hockey in Poland. 10 teams participated in the league, and Legia Warszawa won the championship.

== First round ==
=== North Group ===
	Club
1.	Legia Warszawa
2.	Gwardia Bydgoszcz
3.	ŁKS Łódź
4.	Budowlani Opole
5.	KS Pomorzanin Toruń
6.	AZS Katowice

=== South Group ===
	Club
1.	Górnik Janów
2.	Gwardia Katowice
3.	Spójnia Nowy Targ
4.	KTH Krynica

== Second round ==
=== Final round ===
	Club	GP	Goals	Pts
1.	Legia Warszawa	3	21:6	6
2.	Gwardia Bydgoszcz	3	20:10	4
3.	Górnik Janów	3	9:10	2
4.	Gwardia Katowice	3	7:31	0

=== 5th-8th place ===
	Club	GP	Goals	Pts
5.	Spójnia Nowy Targ	3	17:11	5
6.	KTH Krynica	3	18:15	3
7.	ŁKS Łódź	3	12:14	2
8.	Budowlani Opole	3	13:20	2
