= Walerian Kisieliński =

Polish footballer (1907–1988)

Personal information
- Date of birth: 1 March 1907
- Place of birth: Brzezinka, Poland
- Date of death: 19 February 1988 (aged 80)
- Place of death: Warsaw, Poland
- Height: 1.75 m (5 ft 9 in)
- Position: Forward

Senior career*
Years	Team	Apps	(Gls)
1919–1924	Soła Oświęcim		
1925–1926	PKS Katowice		
1926–1930	Fablok Chrzanów		
1930–1932	Wisła Kraków		
1933–1935	Cracovia		
1936–1939	Polonia Warsaw		
1945	Polonia Warsaw		

International career
1931–1937	Poland	7	(2)

Managerial career
- Legia Warsaw II
- Marymont Warsaw
- * Club domestic league appearances and goals

Walerian Kisieliński (1 March 1907 – 19 February 1988) was a Polish footballer who played as a forward. He was capped seven times for the Poland national team between 1931 and 1937, scoring 2 goals. He was also part of Poland's squad for the 1936 Summer Olympics.

Kisieliński played in several teams, after starting his career in Soła Oświęcim, he moved among others to Fablok Chrzanów (1926–1930), then Wisła Kraków (1930–1932), Cracovia (1932–1935) finally to settle in Warsaw, to play for Polonia Warsaw (1936–1939, 1945). He was twice champion of Poland with Wisła Kraków (1927 and 1928), and was the top scorer of the Polish top tier in 1931.

== Honours ==
Wisła Kraków

- Ekstraklasa: 1927, 1928

Individual

- Ekstraklasa top scorer: 1931
