= Retro Liga =

Association football league in Poland

- Founded: 2017; 9 years ago
- Country: Poland
- Number of clubs: 9
- Current champions: Victoria Sosnowiec (1st title) (2025)
- Most championships: Strzelec Białystok Choroszcz (4 titles)
- Website: retroliga.com.pl

The Retro Liga is an amateur association football league in Poland. Incepted in 2017, its inauguration took place in 2019, 100 years after the formation of the Polish Football Association.

== Creation and rules ==
The idea of the league was to play with the rules and equipment used in football at the time of the Polish Football Association's formation in 1919. The equipment includes traditional leather boots with wooden studs, cotton shirts, and leather balls were used. The game follows the same rules as those used in 1919, such as no cards, and players only being dismissed after serious foul play, and goalkeepers being able to pick the ball up from back passes. The league structure also went back to those of the pre-war years, such as 2 points for a win instead of the 3 points you get now.

The league also has a clear rule on the teams that can included to participate, the rules being that the club must have ceased to exist by 1939, so only teams that played in the pre-war era and those that were not activated afterwards can be represented in the competition. Initially six teams were to take part in the first season; Lechia Lwów, Czarni Lwów, WKS 10 PP Łowicz, Śmigły Wilno, WKS 37 PP Kutno, and WKS Grodno, however the Czarni Lwów team dropped out before the start of the competition. Owing to the changing of Polish borders after WWII, those teams from cities that are no longer in Poland are played in different cities from where their name suggests, for instance Lechia Lwów, from Lviv now in Ukraine, play in Dzierżoniów. The other clubs whose original cities are now outside of Poland's borders are Śmigły Wilno, from Vilnius now in Lithuania, who play in Warsaw, and WKS Grodno, from Grodno now in Belarus, who play in Kozienice.

== History ==
The first season took place in 2019 with 5 teams taking part, with each team playing each other once home and away for a total of 8 games each over the season. The season saw Lechia Lwów go unbeaten, winning 6 of their 8 games, and conceding only 6 in the process. WKS Grodno and WKS 37 PP Kutno rounded off the top three, while Śmigły Wilno came last having lost all their games and scored only 1 goal.

The second season saw the introduction of the sixth team, Hakoach Będzin. However the COVID-19 pandemic saw a new format for the 2020 season, seeing an introduction of regionalised games, requiring less travel for all teams, before a third place playoff and a final to decide the winners and second placed team, drastically reducing the overall games played. The third place playoff saw Hakoach Będzin playing WKS 37 PP Kutno with the game finishing 1–1. The result of the game on deciding who will finish in third place overall was decided on a coin toss, with the toss favouring Hakoach Będzin. The final saw Lechia Lwów going up against WKS Grodno, winning 2–0 and defending their title.

The 2021 season saw the introduction of Czarni Lwów and Strzelec Białystok Choroszcz. The format returned to the league structure, with the initial plan for each team to play each other twice, however this was revised later with teams playing each other once.

2022 saw yet more teams being included, with Victoria Sosnowiec, Pogoń Lwów, and WKS 42 PP Białystok being introduced for the competitions fourth season.

== Teams ==
Information		Seasons		1939	Present day
Team	Titles	Position in 2025	Highest finish	City	
Czarni Lwów	0	6th	2nd (2021)	Lwów	Wałbrzych
Hakoach Będzin	0	N/A	3rd (2020)	Będzin	
Lechja Lwów	2	5th	1st (2019, 2020)	Lwów	Dzierżoniów
Pogoń Lwów	0	8th	7th (2023)	Lwów	Żarów
Śmigły Wilno	0	N/A	5th (2019)	Wilno	Warsaw
Strzelec Białystok Choroszcz	4	2nd	1st (2021, 2022, 2023, 2024)	Choroszcz	
Victoria Sosnowiec	1	1st	1st (2025)	Sosnowiec	
Wisła Retro	0	7th	7th (2025)	Kraków	
WKS 10PP Łowicz	0	9th	4th (2019)	Łowicz	
WKS 37PP Kutno	0	4th	3rd (2019)	Kutno	
WKS 42 PP Białystok	0	3rd	3rd (2023, 2025)	Białystok	
WKS Grodno	0	N/A	2nd (2019, 2020)	Grodno	Kozienice

=== Participation ===
Team	2019	2020	2021	2022	2023	2024	2025
Czarni Lwów	—	—	2nd	5th	4th	3rd	6th
Hakoach Będzin	—	3rd	4th	—	—	—	—
Lechia Lwów	1st	1st	3rd	2nd	5th	2nd	5th
Pogoń Lwów	—	—	—	8th	7th	8th	8th
Śmigły Wilno	5th	6th	8th	—	—	—	—
Strzelec Białystok Choroszcz	—	—	1st	1st	1st	1st	2nd
Victoria Sosnowiec	—	—	—	3rd	2nd	4th	1st
Wisła Retro	—	—	—	—	—	—	7th
WKS 10PP Łowicz	4th	5th	7th	—	8th	7th	9th
WKS 37PP Kutno	3rd	4th	6th	6th	6th	5th	4th
WKS 42 PP Białystok	—	—	—	4th	3rd	6th	3rd
WKS Grodno	2nd	2nd	5th	7th	—	—	—

== Seasons ==
=== 2019 ===
Pos	Team	Pld	W	D	L	GF	GA	GD	Pts
1	Lechia Lwów	8	6	2	0	48	6	+42	14
2	WKS Grodno	8	5	0	3	29	11	+18	10
3	WKS 37 PP Kutno	8	4	1	3	29	16	+13	9
4	WKS 10 PP Łowicz	8	3	1	4	27	25	+2	7
5	Śmigły Wilno	8	0	0	8	1	77	-76	0

=== 2020 ===
Group A
Pos	Team	Pld	W	D	L	GF	GA	GD	Pts
1	WKS 37 PP Kutno	2	1	1	0	4	0	+4	3
2	Lechia Lwów	2	1	1	0	2	1	+1	3
3	WKS 10 PP Łowicz	0	0	2	1	6	-5	0	

Group B
Pos	Team	Pld	W	D	L	GF	GA	GD	Pts
1	Hakoach Będzin	2	2	0	0	16	0	+16	4
2	WKS Grodno	2	1	0	1	9	3	+6	2
3	Śmigły Wilno	2	0	0	2	0	22	0	

Semifinals
Team 1	Team 2	Game 1	Game 2	Agg.	Notes
WKS Grodno	WKS 37 PP Kutno	6–2	3–1	9–3	WKS Grodno progress to the final
Lechia Lwów	Hakoach Będzin	3–0	0–2	3–2	Lechia progress to the final

Finals
Game	Team 1	Team 2	Score	Notes	
Final	Lechia Lwów	WKS Grodno	2–0	Lechia Lwów won the 2020 Retro Liga title	WKS Grodno finish as runners-up
Third place final	Hakoach Będzin	WKS 37 PP Kutno	1–1	As the result was a draw, the match result was awarded on a coin toss giving Hakoach Będzin the win, and 3rd overall	WKS 37 PP Kutno finish 4th overall
Fifth place final	WKS 10 PP Łowicz	Śmigły Wilno	?	WKS 10 PP Łowicz won to finish 5th overall	Śmigły Wilno finish 6th overall

=== 2021 ===
Pos	Team	Pld	W	D	L	Pts
1	Strzelec Białystok Choroszcz	7	6	0	1	12
2	Czarni Lwów	7	5	1	1	11
3	Lechia Lwów	7	5	1	1	11
4	Hakoach Będzin	7	3	0	4	6
5	WKS Grodno	7	3	0	4	6
6	WKS 37 PP Kutno	7	3	0	4	6
7	WKS 10 PP Łowicz	7	2	0	5	4
8	Śmigły Wilno	7	0	0	7	0

=== 2022 ===
Pos	Team	Pld	W	D	L	Pts
1	Strzelec Białystok Choroszcz	7	4	2	1	10
2	Lechja Lwów	7	4	1	2	9
3	Victoria Sosnowiec	7	3	2	2	8
4	WKS 42 PP Białystok	7	1	6	0	8
5	Czarni Lwów	7	2	2	3	6
6	WKS 37 PP Kutno	7	2	2	3	6
7	WKS Grodno	7	2	2	3	6
8	Pogoń Lwów	7	1	1	5	3

=== 2023 ===
Pos	Team	Pld	W	D	L	Pts
1	Strzelec Białystok Choroszcz	7	6	0	1	12
2	Victoria Sosnowiec	7	6	0	1	12
3	WKS 42 PP Białystok	7	6	0	1	12
4	Czarni Lwów	7	4	0	3	8
5	Lechja Lwów	7	2	0	5	4
6	WKS 37 PP Kutno	7	2	0	5	4
7	Pogoń Lwów	7	2	0	5	4
8	WKS 10 PP Łowicz	7	0	0	7	0

=== 2024 ===
Pos	Team	Pld	W	D	L	Pts
1	Strzelec Białystok Choroszcz	7	6	1	0	13
2	Lechja Lwów	7	5	1	1	11
3	Czarni Lwów	7	5	0	2	10
4	Victoria Sosnowiec	7	4	1	2	9
5	WKS 37 PP Kutno	7	2	1	4	5
6	WKS 42 PP Białystok	7	2	0	5	4
7	WKS 10 PP Łowicz	7	2	0	5	4
8	Pogoń Lwów	7	0	0	7	0

=== 2025 ===
Pos	Team	Pld	W	D	L	Pts
1	Victoria Sosnowiec	8	7	0	1	14
2	Strzelec Białystok Choroszcz	8	6	0	2	12
3	WKS 42 PP Białystok	8	5	1	2	11
4	WKS 37 PP Kutno	8	5	0	3	10
5	Lechja Lwów	8	5	0	3	10
6	Czarni Lwów	8	4	1	3	9
7	Wisła Retro	8	2	0	6	4
7	Pogoń Lwów	8	1	0	7	2
8	WKS 10 PP Łowicz	8	0	0	8	0

== Champions ==
- 2019: Lechja Lwów
- 2020: Lechja Lwów
- 2021: Strzelec Białystok Choroszcz
- 2022: Strzelec Białystok Choroszcz
- 2023: Strzelec Białystok Choroszcz
- 2024: Strzelec Białystok Choroszcz
- 2025: Victoria Sosnowiec

=== Team performances ===
Team	Winners	Runners-up	Third place	Winning years
Strzelec Białystok Choroszcz	4	1	—	2021, 2022, 2023, 2024
Lechja Lwów	2	2	1	2019, 2020
Victoria Sosnowiec	1	1	1	2026
WKS Grodno	—	2	—	—
Czarni Lwów	—	1	1	—
WKS 42 PP Białystok	—	—	2	—
Hakoach Będzin	—	—	1	—
WKS 37 PP Kutno	—	—	1	—
