= Lechia Lwów =

Defunct Polish association football team

- Full name: Lwowski Klub Sportowy; Lechia Lwów
- Founded: 1903
- Dissolved: 1939
- Ground: Sokół Stadium, Lwów
- Capacity: 3,000
Home colours	Away colours

Lechia Lwów (full name: Lwowski Klub Sportowy "Lechia" Lwów) was the first former Polish professional association football club, founded in summer 1903 in Lwów by students of the 3rd and 4th gymnasiums as well as former members of the Sokół football department.

During the Second Republic of Poland the club was one of four teams from Lwów that played in the Polish Football First league (season 1931 – 12th). The club became two times champion of Lwów District League (liga okręgowa) where it spent 17 seasons. After invasion of Poland by the Soviet forces in 1939 the club was dissolved and its place was formed FC Lokomotyv Lviv. The club's name comes from Lechia, the original name for Poland.

The club's tradition as a Polish club was continued by people expelled from Lwów who moved to Gdańsk and created Lechia Gdańsk after war in 1945 such as Ryszard Koncewicz.

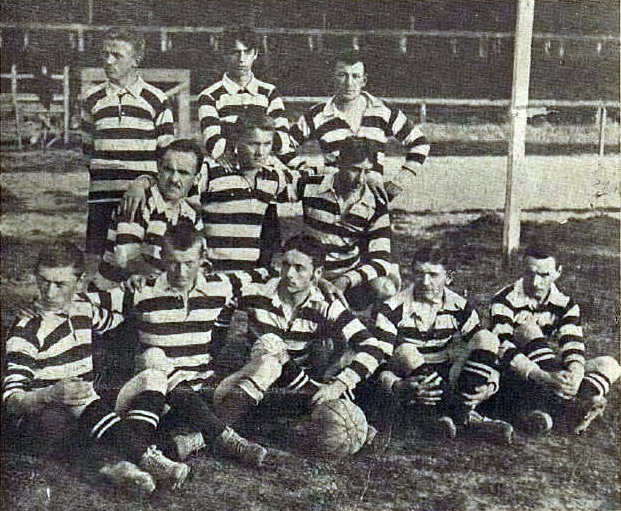
Lechia Lwów players in 1909

== General information ==
- Full name: Lwowski Klub Sportowy (Lwów's Sports Club) "Lechia" Lwów
- Founded: 1903 in Lwów
- Hues: White-Green
- Sections: football, ice-hockey, boxing
- Stadium: Sokół Stadium (today Skif Stadium) and Stadium of the 40th Rifle Regiment (in National League)

== Honours ==
- Promotional play-offs to the National League
  - Winners (1): 1930
  - Runners-up (1): 1929
- Lwów District League
  - Winners (2): 1929, 1930
  - Runners-up (2): 1927, 1933
- Ekstraklasa (National League)
  - Participant (1): 1931

== Retro league ==
In 2019, the Lechia Lwów team had been reconstructed by the historical reconstruction association in Poland as part of the Retro Liga project. The players play in carefully recreated costumes and shoes according to the rules of 1938. The teams chosen for the Retro Liga were those forced to disband in 1939 after the outbreak of World War II. The other teams who took part were WKS Kutno, WKS Łowicz, WKS Grodno (Grodno were not reformed as the borders after WWII meant they were now in Belorussian territory), and Śmigły Wilno (Śmigły were not reformed as the borders after WWII meant they were now in Lithuanian territory).

Lechia Lwów were crowned the inaugural winners of the Retro Liga for the 2019 season.

== See also ==
- History of football in Poland
- Czarni Lwów
- Pogoń Lwów
- Sparta Lwów
- Hasmonea Lwów
- Lechia Gdańsk
- Sports in Poland
