= Krzysztof Budka =

Polish footballer (born 1958)

Personal information
- Full name: Krzysztof Ireneusz Budka
- Date of birth: 2 September 1958 (age 68)
- Place of birth: Kraków, Poland
- Height: 1.90 m (6 ft 3 in)
- Position: Defender

Youth career
- Wisła Kraków

Senior career*
Years	Team	Apps	(Gls)
1975–1985	Wisła Kraków	192	(3)
1985–1986	Zagłębie Lubin	19	(1)
1989–1991	Legia Warsaw	50	(0)
Total		261	(4)

International career
1989	Poland	3	(0)
- * Club domestic league appearances and goals

Krzysztof Ireneusz Budka (born 2 September 1958) is a Polish former professional footballer who played as a defender.

Budka earned three caps for the Poland national team in 1989.

== Honours ==
Wisła Kraków

- Ekstraklasa: 1977–78

Legia Warsaw

- Polish Cup: 1988–89, 1989–90
- Polish Super Cup: 1989
