= Henk Blomvliet =

Dutch footballer (1911–1980)

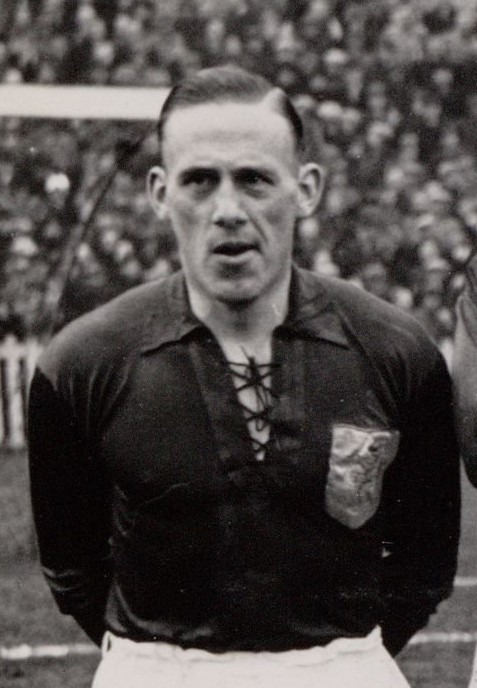

Personal information
- Full name: Hendrik Harmanus Blomvliet
- Date of birth: 24 February 1911
- Place of birth: Amsterdam, Netherlands
- Date of death: 14 March 1980 (aged 69)
- Position: Defender

Senior career*
Years	Team	Apps	(Gls)
1932-1947	Ajax	189	(40)

International career
1939	Netherlands	2	(0)
- * Club domestic league appearances and goals

Henk Blomvliet (24 February 1911 – 14 March 1980) was a Dutch footballer. He played in two matches for the Netherlands national football team in 1939.
