= Klemens Frankowski =

Polish footballer (1916–1943)

Personal information
- Date of birth: 23 November 1916
- Place of birth: Garwolin, Poland
- Date of death: 29 May 1943 (aged 26)
- Place of death: Warsaw, German-occupied Poland
- Height: 1.76 m (5 ft 9 in)
- Position: Forward

Senior career*
Years	Team	Apps	(Gls)
1935–1938	Legia Warsaw	7	(1)
- * Club domestic league appearances and goals

Klemens Frankowski (23 November 1916 – 29 May 1943) was a Polish professional footballer who played as a forward in Liga Piłki Nożnej for Legia Warsaw. Frankowski served in the Home Army during the Second World War and was shot to death by Nazi forces in 1943.
