= Stefan Doniec =

Polish footballer

Personal information
- Full name: Stefan Franciszek Doniec
- Date of birth: 21 July 1908
- Place of birth: Kraków, Poland
- Date of death: 26 July 2001 (aged 93)
- Place of death: Kraków, Poland
- Height: 1.82 m (6 ft 0 in)
- Position: Defender

Senior career*
Years	Team	Apps	(Gls)
1924–1939	Cracovia		

International career
1935	Poland	3	(0)
- * Club domestic league appearances and goals

Stefan Franciszek Doniec (21 July 1908 – 26 July 2001) was a Polish footballer who played as a defender. He played in three matches for the Poland national football team in 1935.

== Honours ==
Cracovia

- Ekstraklasa: 1932
