= Edward M. Miller =

American economist (born 1944)

- Born: Edward McCarthy Miller Jr. September 2, 1944 (age 81)
- Education: Massachusetts Institute of Technology (PhD)
- Occupations: Economist; writer

Edward McCarthy Miller Jr. (born September 2, 1944) is an American economist and writer. His writings on race and intelligence have sparked debates on academic freedom. He has written extensively for racialist publications.

== Life and career ==
Miller attended MIT, where he earned bachelor's degrees in mechanical engineering and economics in 1965, before earning a Ph.D. in economics in 1970. From 1970 to 1972, he was an economist with the United States Department of Transportation. During the Richard Nixon administration, Miller was an economist with the United States Department of the Treasury, Office of Tax Analysis, on detail to the White House, from 1972 to 1973. He then served in the Energy Policy Office at the United States Department of Energy from 1973 to 1974. Miller then took a position at the Office of Management and Budget from 1974 to 1976.

Miller was then appointed Tsanoff Professor of Public Affairs at Rice University. He was appointed research professor of economics and finance, at the University of New Orleans in 1984.

Miller began writing about the economics of intelligence before expanding to discuss purported correlations of race and intelligence, sex and intelligence, and topics related to eugenics.

After Miller wrote to local New Orleans paper Gambit Weekly in 1996 to object to an earlier story about race and intelligence, Miller was subjected to discipline for using his university position to lend unwarranted weight to views outside his professional competence. Among those who came to Miller's defense was Robert D. Chatelle at the National Writers Union.
