= Henryk Przeździecki =

Polish footballer and ice hockey player

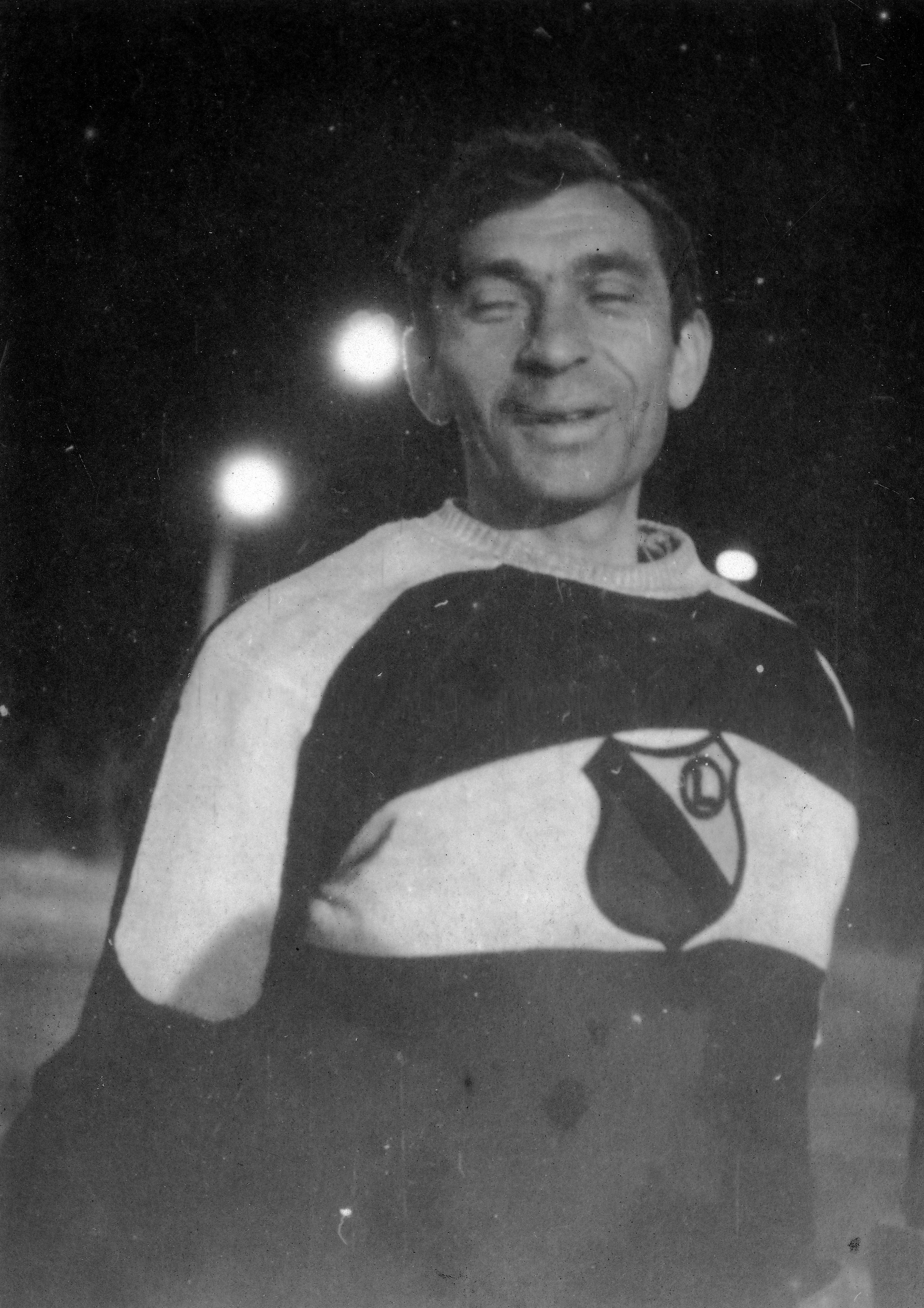
- Born: 20 February 1909 Warsaw, Russian Empire
- Died: 1 November 1977 (aged 68) Warsaw, Poland
- Height: 5 ft 5 in (165 cm)
- Weight: 115 lb (52 kg; 8 st 3 lb)
- Position: Goaltender
- Played for: Legia Warsaw
- National team: Poland
- Playing career: 1931–1939; 1945–1952

Henryk Przeździecki (20 February 1909 – 1 November 1977) was a Polish ice hockey goaltender and footballer. He played for Legia Warsaw during his hockey career. He also played for the Poland national ice hockey team at the 1936 and 1948 Winter Olympics and 1937 World Championship.

As a footballer, he played for Warsaw-based clubs Orkan, Legia and Syrena as a midfielder. He also earned one official cap for the Poland national football team. He was captured during the invasion of Poland at the onset of the World War II and spent the rest of the war as a prisoner at Stalag II-B.
