= Ted Millar =

Australian rules footballer, born 1918

Personal information
- Full name: Edward George Millar
- Born: 31 October 1918; Korong Vale, Victoria
- Died: 21 August 2008 (aged 89); Ballarat, Victoria
- Original team: Korong Vale
- Height: 174 cm (5 ft 9 in)
- Weight: 80 kg (176 lb)

Playing career^{1}
Years	Club	Games (Goals)
1938	St Kilda	2 (0)
- ^{1} Playing statistics correct to the end of 1938.

Edward George Millar (31 October 1918 – 21 August 2008) was an Australian rules footballer who played with St Kilda in the Victorian Football League (VFL).

Millar later served in the Royal Australian Air Force in World War II.
