= Edward Miller (priest) =

The Ven Edward Miller
- Anglican Archdeacon of Colombo
- Church: Anglican Church of Ceylon
- See: Anglican Diocese of Colombo
- In office: 1889 — 1891

Edward Francis Miller (1848 - March 15, 1951), MA was the Anglican Archdeacon of Colombo from 1889 to 1891.

He graduated from St John's College, Cambridge in 1871 and was ordained in 1873. After working in England as a school chaplain, he was Warden of St Thomas' College, Mount Lavinia from 1877 until his appointment as Archdeacon.

He died in his 97th year on 13 March 1951.
