= Franz Hanreiter =

Austrian footballer

Personal information
- Date of birth: 4 November 1913
- Date of death: 21 January 1992 (aged 78)
- Position: Midfielder

Senior career*
Years	Team	Apps	(Gls)
1935–1936	Wacker Wien		
1936–1938	FC Rouen		
1941–1942	Admira Wien		

International career
1935–1936	Austria	6	(2)
1940–1942	Germany	7	(0)
- * Club domestic league appearances and goals

Franz Hanreiter (4 November 1913 – 21 January 1992) was an Austrian international footballer.
