= Otto Riesner =

Polish footballer

Personal information
- Full name: Otto Hugo Reisner
- Date of birth: 29 January 1910
- Place of birth: Ligota, German Empire
- Height: 1.62 m (5 ft 4 in)
- Position: Winger

Senior career*
Years	Team	Apps	(Gls)
1922–1926	Diana Katowice		
1926–1928	PKS Katowice		
1928	Polonia Warsaw		
1929–1930	PKS Katowice		
1930–1937	Garbarnia Kraków		
1938–1939	Fablok Chrzanów		

International career
1931–1935	Poland	6	(0)
- * Club domestic league appearances and goals

Otto Hugo Riesner (born 29 January 1910, date of death unknown) was a Polish footballer who played as a winger.

He played in six matches for the Poland national team from 1931 to 1935.

== Honours ==
Garbarnia Kraków

- Ekstraklasa: 1931
