= Alfred Pochopień =

Polish footballer

Personal information
- Full name: Alfred Tomasz Pochopień
- Date of birth: 19 April 1917
- Place of birth: Hindenburg, German Empire
- Date of death: 7 November 1951 (aged 34)
- Place of death: Nowy Bytom, Poland
- Height: 1.72 m (5 ft 8 in)
- Position: Forward

Senior career*
Years	Team	Apps	(Gls)
- Stadion Królewska Huta
1935–1939	AKS Chorzów		
1939–1942	Germania Königshütte		
1945	Baildon Katowice		
1945–1946	Pogoń Katowice		
1946–1947	Lechia Gdańsk		
1947–1948	Polonia Bytom		

International career
1939	Poland	1	(0)
- * Club domestic league appearances and goals

Alfred Tomasz Pochopień (19 April 1917 – 7 November 1951) was a Polish footballer who played as a forward.

He made one appearance for the Poland national football team in 1939.
