= Edward Miller (footballer) =

Polish footballer

Personal information
- Date of birth: 31 May 1908
- Place of birth: Łódź, Poland
- Date of death: 26 August 1965 (aged 57)
- Place of death: Łódź, Poland
- Height: 1.66 m (5 ft 5 in)
- Position: Winger

Senior career*
| Years | Team | Apps | (Gls) |
- Orkan Łódź
| 1933–1939 | ŁKS Łódź | 91 | (16) |
| 1940–1943 | Union 97 | | |

International career
| 1936 | Poland | 1 | (0) |
- * Club domestic league appearances and goals

Edward Miller (31 May 1908 – 26 August 1965) was a Polish footballer who played as a winger. He played in one match for the Poland national team in 1936.
