= Antoni Komendo-Borowski =

Polish footballer (1912–1984)

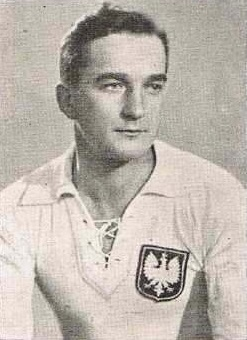

Personal information
- Date of birth: 6 June 1912
- Place of birth: Białystok, Poland
- Date of death: 12 May 1984 (aged 71)
- Place of death: Bradford, England
- Height: 1.78 m (5 ft 10 in)
- Position: Forward

Senior career*
Years	Team	Apps	(Gls)
1929–1933	Jagiellonia Białystok		
1933–1939	Pogoń Lwów		

International career
1935	Poland	1	(1)
- * Club domestic league appearances and goals

Antoni Komendo-Borowski (6 June 1912 – 12 May 1984) was a Polish footballer who played as a forward. He scored in his sole appearance for the Poland national team, in a 3–3 draw against Latvia on 15 September 1935.

During World War II, he fought in the September campaign, following which he was imprisoned in a POW camp in Hungary. In 1944, he was injured in the Battle of Monte Cassino.

A statue commemorating Komendo-Borowski and fellow former Jagiellonia player and soldier, Julian Buchcik, was erected outside the Białystok Stadium in May 2022.
