= WKS Grodno =

Polish football club

- Full name: Wojskowy Klub Sportowy Grodno
- Founded: 1934
- Dissolved: 1939
- League: Retro Liga (reconstructed)

Wojskowy Klub Sportowy Grodno (WKS Grodno) was a Polish football team, located in Grodno, Poland (now Belarus), on the historic territory of Kresy Wschodnie (Polish Eastern Borderlands).

The club was founded in 1934, when the team of “Cresovia” Grodno merged with a few local clubs. A year later, WKS won championships of the Białystok A-Class, however, it never succeeded in winning championships of northeastern Poland, year by year losing to the local powerhouse, Śmigły Wilno. Grodno's side was supported by the garrison of the Polish Army and it ceased to exist after Soviet invasion of Poland (1939).

== Retro league ==
In 2019, the WKS Grodno team had been reconstructed by the historical reconstruction association in Poland as part of the Retro Liga project. The players play in carefully recreated costumes and shoes according to the rules of 1938. The teams chosen for the Retro Liga were those forced to disband in 1939 after the outbreak of World War II. The other teams who took part were WKS Kutno, WKS Łowicz, Śmigły Wilno (Śmigły were not reformed as the borders after WWII meant they were now in Lithuanian territory), and Lechia Lwów (Lechia were not reformed as the borders after WWII meant they were now in Ukrainian territory).

== See also ==
- FC Neman Grodno

== Sources ==
- (in Polish) A June 22, 1939 newspaper article with history of WKS Grodno.
