= Ryszard Łysakowski =

Polish footballer

Personal information
- Full name: Ryszard Walery Łysakowski
- Date of birth: 7 June 1911
- Place of birth: Lublin, Poland
- Date of death: 31 August 2008 (aged 97)
- Place of death: Warsaw, Poland
- Height: 1.70 m (5 ft 7 in)
- Position: Forward

Senior career*
Years	Team	Apps	(Gls)
1924–1933	KS Lublinianka		
1933–1937	Legia Warsaw		
1937–1939	Polonia Warsaw		
1946	Górnik Wałbrzych		
1947–1949	Len Wałbrzych		

International career
1934	Poland	1	(1)
- * Club domestic league appearances and goals

Ryszard Walery Łysakowski (7 June 1911 – 31 August 2008) was a Polish footballer who played as a forward. He made one appearance for the Poland national team in 1934.

Łysakowski participated in the September campaign, and later fought in the Warsaw Uprising as a Home Army soldier. After being arrested, he was placed in the Dulag 121 camp in Pruszków, before being held in the Gross-Rosen, Mittelbau-Dora, Harzungen and Bergen-Belsen concentration camps, and was liberated from the latter in April 1945.
