= Alojzy Sitko =

Polish footballer and manager (1911–1989)

Personal information
- Full name: Alojzy Antoni Sitko
- Date of birth: 5 July 1911
- Place of birth: Bottrop, German Empire
- Date of death: 23 November 1989 (aged 78)
- Place of death: Wodzisław Śląski, Poland
- Height: 1.81 m (5 ft 11 in)
- Position: Defender

Youth career
- Skawa Wadowice
- Sucha Podchalańska
- Kalwaria Zebrzydowice
- Odra Wodzisław

Senior career*
Years	Team	Apps	(Gls)
–1935	Olsza Kraków		
1935–1939	Wisła Kraków	41	
1945–1947	Piast Cieszyn		

Managerial career
- 1953: Górnik Radlin
- 1956: Poland (assistant)
- 1956: Poland (selection committee)
- 1958–1961: Stal Sosnowiec
- 1962–1964: Thorez Wałbrzych
- Arkonia Szczecin
- 1967–????: Zagłębie Thoreza
- 1972–1973: Flota Świnoujście
- Lotnik Wrocław
- Górnik Polkowice
- 1974–1975: Zagłębie Lubin
- Szczecin OZPN
- * Club domestic league appearances and goals

Alojzy Antoni Sitko (5 July 1911 – 23 November 1989) was a Polish footballer and manager who played as a defender.

== Early life and playing career ==
Sitko began playing football while at middle school in Wadowice. While in high school, he played for Skawa Wadowice, Sucha Podchalańska, and Kalwaria Zebrzydowice, before joining Odra Wodzisław. He later joined Olsza Kraków, making his debut for the club while still a student. In 1935, he joined Wisła Kraków, where he played as a left-back as Wisła finished runners-up in the 1936 Ekstraklasa. While there, he also played against teams from France and Belgium, as well as Hungarian club Ferencváros and English club Chelsea, and made 41 appearances in the Ekstraklasa. After World War II, he played for Piast Cieszyn until 1947.

In 1936, Sitko was selected as a reserve player for Poland's squad at the 1936 Summer Olympics in Berlin.

== Managerial career ==
In 1945, following the end of World War II, Sitko applied for an instructor's course in Katowice, where he became part of the group that helped restart Polish football. Sitko worked for several clubs in Poland, including Górnik Radlin, Stal Sosnowiec, Thorez Wałbrzych, Arkonia Szczecin, Zagłębie Thoreza, Flota Świnoujście, Lotnik Wrocław, and Górnik Polkowice.

In June 1974, he was appointed the manager of Zagłębie Lubin, where he helped them beat defending Ekstraklasa and Polish Cup winners Ruch Chorzów 3–2. However, after getting them promoted to the I liga, Zagłębie struggled, resulting in them replacing Sitko with Zdzisław Wolsza, with him later joining Szczecin OZPN.

In July 1956, he served as an assistant manager to Ryszard Koncewicz with the Poland national team, before becoming a member of their selection committee for their 2–1 defeat against Bulgaria the following month.

== Personal life and death ==
Outside of football, Sitko worked as a civil servant. Sitko died on 23 November 1989, at the age of 78.
