= Kazimierz Lis =

Polish footballer

Personal information
- Full name: Kazimierz Lis
- Date of birth: 9 April 1910
- Place of birth: Poznań, German Empire
- Date of death: 15 July 1998 (aged 88)
- Place of death: Poznań, Poland
- Positions: Midfielder; forward

Senior career*
Years	Team	Apps	(Gls)
- Warta Poznań
- * Club domestic league appearances and goals

Kazimierz Lis (9 April 1910 – 15 July 1998) was a Polish footballer.

He played in the 1930s and late 1940s for Warta Poznań during the club's golden days - it was one of top teams in Poland (in 1935 it was third overall, in 1938 - second). Lis was a member of the reserve team of Poland in the 1938 FIFA World Cup in France, and ultimately did not make the final roster. Lis also played in Warta after World War II, in 1947 he was member of the team that won the league title.

== Honours ==
Warta Poznań

- Polish Football Championship: 1947
