= 1931 Ekstraklasa =

11th season of top-tier football league in Poland

Liga
- Season: 1931
- Champions: Garbarnia Kraków (1st title)
- Relegated: Lechia Lwów
- Goals scored: 511
- Top goalscorer: Walerian Kisieliński (24 goals)

Statistics of Ekstraklasa for the 1931 season.

== Overview ==
It was contested by 12 teams, and Garbarnia Kraków won the championship.

== League table ==
Pos	Team	Pld	W	D	L	GF	GA	GD	Pts
1	Garbarnia Kraków (C)	22	13	4	5	51	22	+29	30
2	Wisła Kraków	22	13	3	6	53	30	+23	29
3	Legia Warsaw	22	14	1	7	57	34	+23	29
4	Pogoń Lwów	22	11	6	5	47	33	+14	28
5	Ruch Chorzów	22	11	3	8	45	46	−1	25
6	ŁKS Łódź	22	10	4	8	48	38	+10	24
7	Warta Poznań	22	11	1	10	56	34	+22	23
8	Polonia Warsaw	22	7	4	11	34	46	−12	18
9	KS Cracovia	22	6	6	10	33	52	−19	18
10	Czarni Lwów	22	7	2	13	28	50	−22	16
11	Warszawianka Warszawa	22	6	1	15	36	60	−24	13
12	Lechia Lwów (R)	22	5	1	16	23	66	−43	11

Source: 90minut.pl (in Polish)
(C) Champions; (R) Relegated

== Results ==
Home \ Away	CRA	CZA	GAR	LEC	LEG	ŁKS	POG	PWA	RUC	WAW	WAR	WIS
Cracovia		3–1	2–4	2–1	1–4	2–2	1–1	1–1	4–1	1–0	1–2	1–4
Czarni Lwów	2–0		0–4	3–2	2–3	1–1	1–1	0–2	1–2	1–0	3–0	1–2
Garbarnia Kraków	1–1	6–1		4–0	0–1	2–1	3–1	2–0	3–1	4–1	2–2	2–3
Lechia Lwów	1–3	2–4	1–4		0–1	0–1	0–3	0–1	2–2	4–0	0–8	2–0
Legia Warsaw	3–1	2–1	0–3	1–2		6–0	2–1	8–1	4–5	7–2	4–1	1–0
ŁKS Łódź	4–1	2–1	1–0	7–0	3–1		3–1	2–3	4–0	1–4	4–0	2–3
Pogoń Lwów	0–0	2–1	1–0	5–1	2–1	3–3		4–0	3–4	5–1	2–0	2–1
Polonia Warsaw	2–2	5–0	2–3	1–2	1–1	1–1	0–4		2–4	6–0	0–2	1–3
Ruch Chorzów	4–2	0–1	1–0	5–0	0–1	3–2	1–1	3–0		2–1	2–0	2–0
Warszawianka	6–1	0–2	1–3	5–1	4–2	0–3	1–3	1–4	2–0		2–1	2–5
Warta Poznań	7–1	6–0	1–0	5–0	1–3	2–0	7–0	0–1	6–1	3–2		1–2
Wisła Kraków	1–2	5–1	0–0	1–2	3–1	4–1	2–2	3–0	6–2	1–1	4–1	

Source: 90minut.pl (in Polish)
Legend: Blue = home team win; Yellow = draw; Red = away team win.
