= Karol Pazurek =

Polish footballer (1905–1945)

Personal information
- Date of birth: 17 December 1905
- Place of birth: Katowice, German Empire
- Date of death: 6 January 1945 (aged 39)
- Place of death: near Miechów, Poland
- Height: 1.69 m (5 ft 7 in)
- Position: Forward

Senior career*
Years	Team	Apps	(Gls)
1921–1924	Turngemeinde Katowice		
1924–1928	Pogoń Katowice		
1926–1927	WKS 73 pp Katowice		
1929–1938	Garbarnia Kraków		
1938	Polonia Warsaw		
1940–1944	DTSG Kraków		

International career
1927–1935	Poland	16	(4)
- * Club domestic league appearances and goals

Karol Pazurek (17 December 1905 – 6 January 1945) was a Polish footballer who played as a forward. He made 16 appearances for the Poland national team from 1927 to 1935.

He was conscripted into the Wehrmacht during the Second World War in 1943 and was killed by partisan gunfire while driving a German car in 1945.

== Honours ==
Garbarnia Kraków

- Ekstraklasa: 1931
