= Edmund Szyc Stadium =

Disused stadium in Poznań, Poland

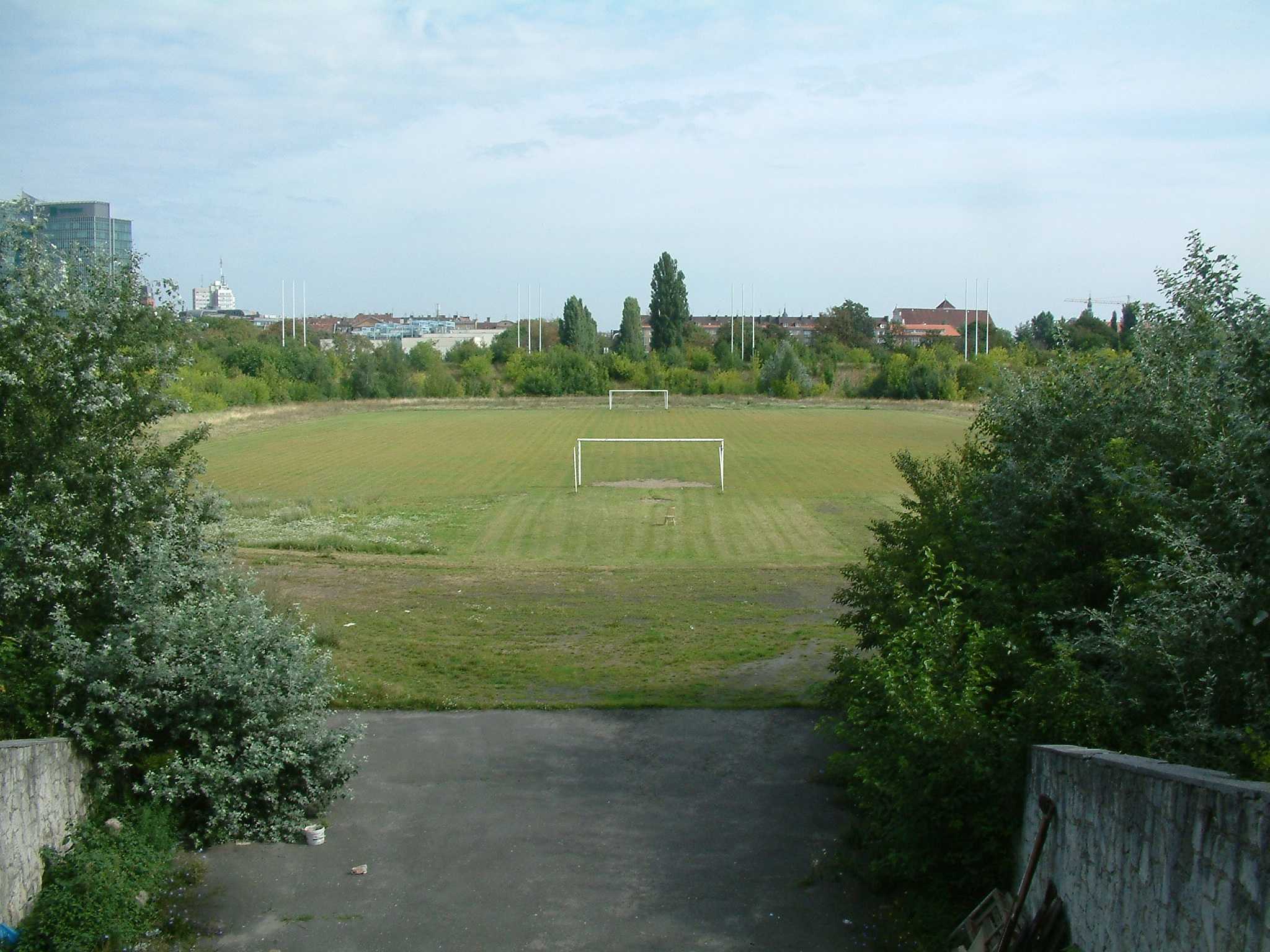
- Stadium in August 2007
- Interactive map of Edmund Szyc Stadium
- Former names: Stadion im. 22 lipca
- Location: Poznań, Poland.
- Coordinates: 52°23′37″N 16°55′52″E
- Owner: TK Development
- Capacity: 60,000
- Record attendance: 80,000 (Peace Race stage)

Construction
- Built: 1929
- Opened: 1929; 1957
- Renovated: 1938-1941; 1946, 1950-1957; 1974
- Expanded: 1950-1957
- Closed: 1937; 1998

Tenants
- Warta Poznań (main tenant; 1929-1938, 1946-1950, 1957-1998); Lech Poznań (sporadically; 1950s-1970s)

The Edmund Szyc Stadium (Polish: Stadion im. Edmunda Szyca) is a ruined multi-purpose stadium in Poznań, Poland, named after Edmund Szyc, one of the founders of Warta Poznań. The stadium opened in 1929 during the "Comprehensive National Exhibition" (Powszechna Wystawa Krajowa) and had a capacity of 60,000 people. It is the historical home of football team Warta Poznań.
