= Antoni Łyko =

Polish footballer (1907–1941)

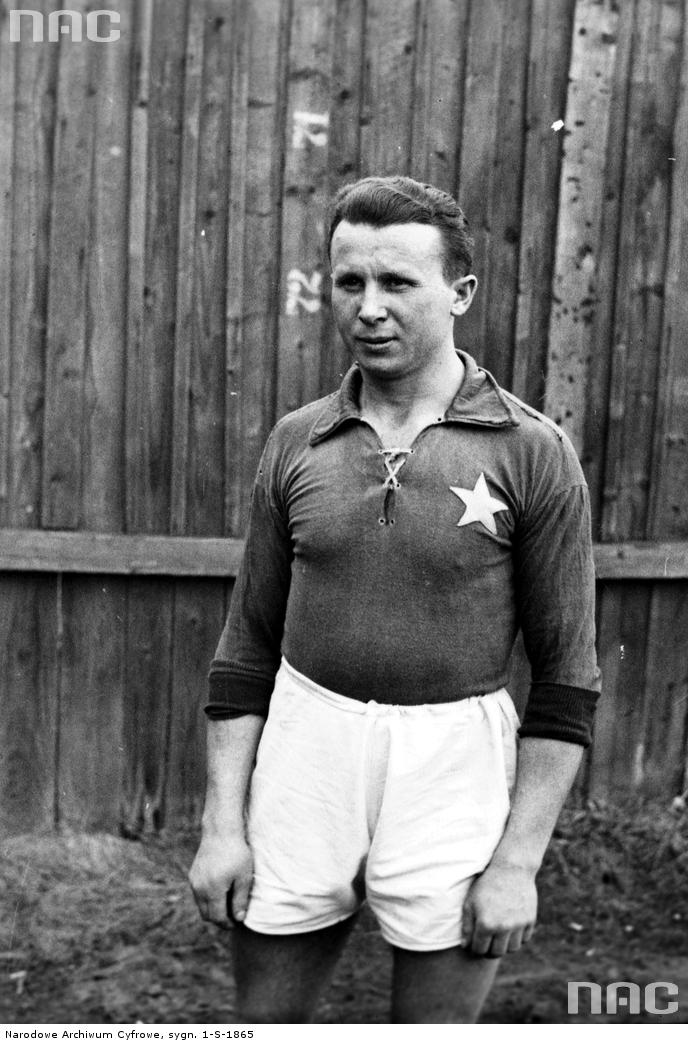

Personal information
- Full name: Antoni Andrzej Łyko
- Date of birth: 27 May 1907
- Place of birth: Kraków, Austria-Hungary
- Date of death: 3 June 1941 (aged 34)
- Place of death: Auschwitz, Third Reich
- Height: 1.72 m (5 ft 8 in)
- Position: Striker

Senior career*
Years	Team	Apps	(Gls)
–1929	Rakowiczanka		
1930–1939	Wisła Kraków	108	(30)

International career
1937–1938	Poland	2	(0)
- * Club domestic league appearances and goals

Antoni Andrzej Łyko (27 May 1907 – 3 June 1941) was a Polish footballer who played as a striker.

When playing for Wisła Kraków, he was a member of the Poland national football team for the 1938 FIFA World Cup. However, he did not actually travel to Strasbourg for the tournament. He was capped twice for Poland, with both games against Latvia.

Implicated in support of the Polish Armed Resistance, Łyko was arrested by the Gestapo on the streets of Kraków during the German occupation in World War II, and taken to the Auschwitz concentration camp, where he was shot in June 1941.

== Sources ==
- Andrzej Gowarzewski : "Fuji Football Encyclopedia. History of the Polish National Team (1)White and Red"; GiA Katowice 1991 ISBN 83-900227-0-2
