= Edward Madejski =

Polish footballer and chemistry engineer

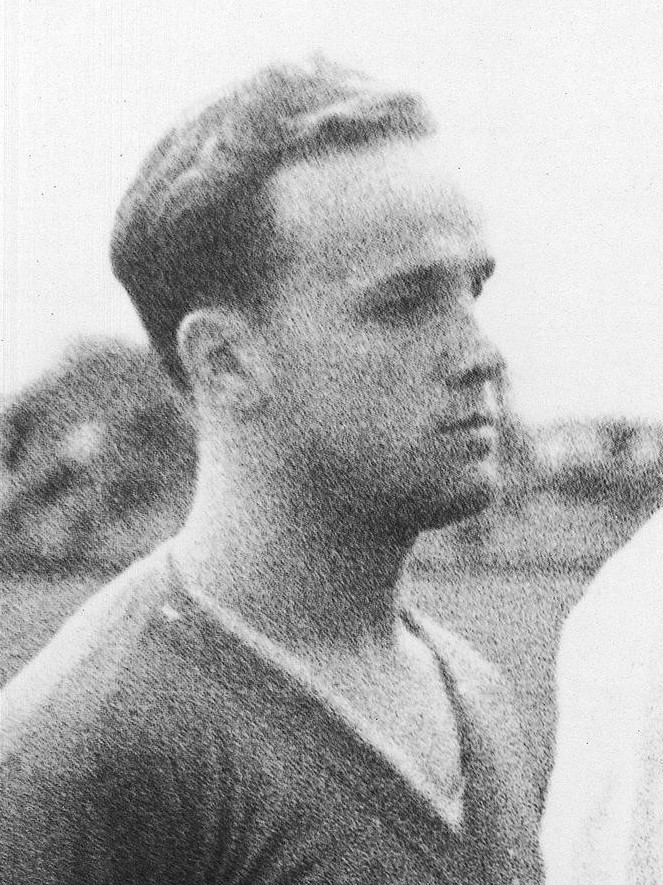

Personal information
- Full name: Edward Dominik Jerzy Madejski
- Date of birth: 11 August 1914
- Place of birth: Kraków, Austria-Hungary
- Date of death: 15 February 1996 (aged 81)
- Place of death: Bytom, Poland
- Height: 1.77 m (5 ft 9 1/2 in)
- Position: Goalkeeper

Senior career*
Years	Team	Apps	(Gls)
1931–1932	Juvenia Kraków		
1932–1937	Wisła Kraków	64	(0)
1939	Garbarnia Kraków		
1939–1945	Zaolzie Trzyniec		
1945–1949	Polonia Bytom		

International career
1936–1938	Poland	11	(0)
- * Club domestic league appearances and goals

Edward Dominik Jerzy Madejski (11 August 1914 – 15 February 1996) was a Polish footballer who played as a goalkeeper. A chemistry engineer, he was a graduate of Mining-Metallurgic Academy in Kraków.

Madejski made 11 appearances for the Poland national team, letting 33 goals into his net. His debut in the white-red Polish jersey took place on 6 September 1936 in Belgrade, when Yugoslavia beat Poland 9–3. He was also part of Poland's squad at the 1936 Summer Olympics, but he did not play in any matches. The last game he played for Poland was a 3–2 loss to Ireland in Dublin on 13 November 1938.

Madejski played at the 1938 FIFA World Cup, and appeared in the 5 June 1938 match against Brazil in Strasbourg, which Poland lost 5–6. At that time, Madejski was banned from playing in any Polish league teams, due to a scandal regarding his transfer from Wisła Kraków to Garbarnia Kraków. As a result, he was not associated with any club for a year.

During the Second World War, Madejski participated in various illegal football tournaments, as all sports in Poland were banned by the German authorities. Arrested by the Gestapo, he spent a few months on death row.
