= Bolesław Habowski =

Polish footballer (1914–1979)

Personal information
- Full name: Bolesław Józef Habowski
- Date of birth: 13 September 1914
- Place of birth: Kraków, Austria-Hungary
- Date of death: 21 May 1979 (aged 64)
- Place of death: Wendover, United Kingdom
- Height: 1.66 m (5 ft 5 1/2 in)
- Position: Striker

Senior career*
Years	Team	Apps	(Gls)
1930–1938	Wisła Kraków	83	(21)
1939	Junak Drohobycz		
1940	Spartak Lviv		
1940	Dynamo Moscow		
1941	Spartak Moscow		
1945–1946	Carpathians F.C.		

International career
1937–1938	Poland	2	(1)
- * Club domestic league appearances and goals

Bolesław Józef Habowski (13 September 1914 – 21 May 1979) was a Polish footballer who played as a forward. Having spent the majority of his career at Wisła Kraków, he also represented the Poland national team.

Habowski's debut in the national team came on 10 October 1937 in Warsaw, in a 4–0 win over Yugoslavia. His second and last game in the white-red jersey took place in Riga on 25 September 1938 in a 1–2 loss to Latvia, scoring a goal in the match.

He played as a forward, was regarded as a very fast and tough player, who never gave up. In the years 1934–1938 he played in all Wisła Kraków's games in the Polish top division. Then, sometime between late 1938 and early 1939, he moved to a rising power of Polish football, Junak Drohobycz. During the Polish September Campaign, he was captured by the Soviets and forcefully taken to Siberia. In 1942, he managed to get to the Polish Army in Soviet Union, created by General Władysław Anders. From there, across Africa, he arrived in England, where he stayed and eventually died.
