= Gwardia Katowice =

Polish sports club

Gwardia Katowice is a Polish sports club from Upper Silesia, sponsored by the Katowice police department. It was founded in 1924 in the Second Polish Republic under the name Policyjny Klub Sportowy Katowice (Police Sports Club Katowice) which was changed into the current name after World War II. In the interwar period the club was famous for its swimmers (numerous champions of Poland) and fencers. The club adopted its current name Gwardia Katowice in 1949.
