= 1951 Wisła Kraków season =

Wisła Kraków
1951 season
- Chairman: Grzegorz Łanin
- Manager: Michał Matyas
- Ekstraklasa: 1st
- Polish Cup: Runner-up
- Top goalscorer: League: Mieczysław Gracz (16 goals); All: Mieczysław Gracz (20 goals)

The 1951 season was Wisła Kraków's 43rd year as a club. Wisła was under the name of Gwardia Kraków.

== Friendlies ==
4 March 1951	Górnik Wałbrzych (Poland)	3–4	(Poland) Gwardia Kraków	Wałbrzych, Poland
	Ignaczak; Czyż; Stoły	Report	Kohut; Gracz; Cisowski; Mordarski

March 1951	Górnik Kowary (Poland)	0–8	(Poland) Gwardia Kraków	Wałbrzych, Poland
		Report

11 March 1951	Gwardia Wrocław (Poland)	3–7	(Poland) Gwardia Kraków	Wrocław, Poland
	Gierżak; Sierżęga; Kuś	Report	Jaskowski; Cisowski; Szczurek (pen.); Gamaj; Rupa; Gracz	Attendance: 4,000; Referee: Czesław Małecki (Wrocław)

26 March 1951	Gwardia Lublin (Poland)	2–4	(Poland) Gwardia Kraków	Lublin, Poland
	Różkiewicz; Grocholski	Report	Kohut; Mordarski; Cisowski	Attendance: 3,000

22 April 1951	Gwardia Kraków (Poland)	7–3	(Poland) Górnik Radlin	Kraków, Poland
16:30 CET (UTC+1)	Gracz; Gamaj; Legutko; Kohut	Report	Schleger; Franke; Węglorz	Stadium: Stadion Gwardii; Attendance: 4,000; Referee: Franciszek Bartyzel (Kraków)

29 April 1951	Gwardia Kraków (Poland)	5–0	(Poland) Stal Bielsko-Biała	Kraków, Poland
	Mordarski; Kotaba; Kohut	Report

23 May 1951	Gwardia Nowa Huta (Poland)	1–10	(Poland) Gwardia Kraków	Kraków, Poland
17:15 CET (UTC+1)	Wójcik	Report	Kohut; Gamaj; Łapiński; Flanek	Stadium: Stadion Gwardii Nowa Huta; Referee: Jan Kotlarczyk (Kraków)

27 May 1951	Puszcza Niepołomice (Poland)	1–6	(Poland) Gwardia Kraków	Niepołomice, Poland
		Report		Stadium: Stadion LZS Puszcza

28 June 1951	Gwardia Kraków (Poland)	3–0	(Poland) Ogniwo Kraków	Kraków, Poland
	Gracz 4'; Kotaba 6', 10'	Report		Referee: Emil Hausner (Kraków)

28 June 1951	Gwardia Kraków (Poland)	0–0	(Poland) Włókniarz Kraków	Kraków, Poland
		Report		Attendance: 6,000

18 July 1951	Gwardia Kraków (Poland)	2–2	(Hungary) Hungarian Miners	Kraków, Poland
	Gracz 80'; Olszewski 83'	Report	Varga 29'; Molnár 72'	Stadium: Stadion Gwardii; Referee: Alfonsy Cober (Gliwice)

26 July 1951	Gwardia Kraków (Poland)	0–1	(Hungary) Dorogi Bányász SK	Kraków, Poland
		Report	Csuberda 48'	Stadium: Stadion Gwardii; Referee: Kazimierz Bukowski (Radom)

7 October 1951	Ogniwo Tarnów (Poland)	1–4	(Poland) Gwardia Kraków	Tarnów, Poland
	Kremski 25' (pen.)	Report	Gracz 13'; Kohut 26', ??'; Mordarski 81'

11 November 1951	Gwardia Kraków (Poland)	1–1	(Poland) Gwardia Kielce	Kraków, Poland
	Mordarski	Report	Iwański	Stadium: Stadion Gwardii; Attendance: 6,000

16 November 1951	Gwardia Kraków (Poland)	0–3	(Soviet Union) Dynamo Tbilisi	Kraków, Poland
		Report	Chkuaseli; Vardimiadi; Gogoberidze	Stadium: Stadion Gwardii; Attendance: 40,000; Referee: Chkhartishvili (Soviet Union)

25 November 1951	Gwardia Kraków (Poland)	3–4	(Poland) OWKS Kraków	Kraków, Poland
	Gracz; Kohut; Dudek (red card) 75'	Report	Piechoczek; Jankowski; Kucharski	Attendance: 5,000; Referee: Władysław Kuleszir (Kraków)

== Ekstraklasa ==
18 March 1951 1	Kolejarz Poznań	1–0	Gwardia Kraków	Poznań
	Anioła 30'	Report		Stadium: Stadion na Dębcu; Attendance: 12,000; Referee: Julian Brzuchowski (Warsaw)

1 April 1951 2	Górnik Radlin	2–2	Gwardia Kraków	Radlin
	Węglorz 29'; Franke 88'	Report	Gracz 48', 85'	Stadium: Stadion Górnika; Attendance: 7,000; Referee: Edmund Andrzejak (Łódź)

8 April 1951 3	Gwardia Kraków	1–1	Unia Chorzów	Kraków
16:00 CET (UTC+1)	Mordarski 58'	Report	Cieślik 44'	Stadium: Stadion Gwardii; Attendance: 30,000; Referee: Eugeniusz Stępień (Łódź)

15 April 1951 4	Kolejarz Warsaw	0–0	Gwardia Kraków	Warsaw
		Report		Stadium: Stadion Polonii; Attendance: 20,000; Referee: Józef Orliński (Katowice)

6 May 1951 5	Ogniwo Bytom	0–1	Gwardia Kraków	Bytom
		Report	Gracz 31'	Stadium: Stadion Polonii; Attendance: 6,000; Referee: Franciszek Wilczyński (Poznań)

20 May 1951 6	Ogniwo Kraków	0–0	Gwardia Kraków	Kraków
17:15 CET (UTC+1)		Report		Stadium: Stadion Cracovii; Attendance: 30,000; Referee: Edmund Andrzejak (Łódź)

3 June 1951 7	Gwardia Kraków	3–1	CWKS Warsaw	Kraków
17:30 CET (UTC+1)	Kohut 5'; Jaskowski 41'; Gracz 79'	Report	Brajter 20'	Stadium: Stadion Gwardii; Attendance: 20,000; Referee: Leon Losiak (Kościan)

6 June 1951 8	Włókniarz Kraków	0–3	Gwardia Kraków	Kraków
17:45 CET (UTC+1)		Report	Gracz 6'; Mordarski 9'; Kohut 59'	Stadium: Stadion Garbarni; Attendance: 10,000; Referee: Jan Grabowski (Sosnowiec)

10 June 1951 9	Gwardia Kraków	1–0	Budowlani Chorzów	Kraków
10:00 CET (UTC+1)	Kotaba 29'; Mordarski (penalty missed) 77'	Report		Stadium: Stadion Gwardii; Attendance: 15,000; Referee: Edward Sperling (Łódź)

17 June 1951 10	Włókniarz Łódź	2–1	Gwardia Kraków	Łódź
	Hogendorf 17'; Gustowski 20'	Report	Kohut 47'	Stadium: Stadion ŁKS-u; Attendance: 25,000; Referee: Marian Nalepa (Zabrze)

21 June 1951 11	Gwardia Kraków	4–0	Gwardia Szczecin	Kraków
17:45 CET (UTC+1)	Kotaba 1'; Kohut 9'; Mordarski 44', 78'; Gracz (penalty missed) 75'	Report		Stadium: Stadion Gwardii; Attendance: 6,000; Referee: Józef Gunia (Katowice)

24 June 1951 12	Gwardia Kraków	2–1	Górnik Radlin	Kraków
17:45 CET (UTC+1)	Kotaba 11'; Mordarski 19'	Report	Schleger 44'	Stadium: Stadion Gwardii; Attendance: 6,000; Referee: Jan Gronowski (Warsaw)

1 July 1951 13	Budowlani Chorzów	2–0	Gwardia Kraków	Chorzów
	Spodzieja 61'; Pilarek 64'	Report		Stadium: Stadion AKS-u; Attendance: 25,000; Referee: Stefan Winiarski (Łódź)

8 July 1951 14	Gwardia Kraków	2–0	Kolejarz Poznań	Kraków
17:45 CET (UTC+1)	Gracz 23', 46'	Report		Stadium: Stadion Gwardii; Attendance: 7,000; Referee: Tadeusz Feret (Katowice)

15 July 1951 15	CWKS Warsaw	1–4	Gwardia Kraków	Warsaw
	Brajter 31'	Report	Jaskowski 30', 56', 65'; Gracz 69' (pen.)	Stadium: Stadion Wojska Polskiego; Attendance: 30,000; Referee: Edmund Andrzejak (Łódź)

25 August 1951 16	Gwardia Kraków	4–0	Włókniarz Łódź	Kraków
16:30 CET (UTC+1)	Kohut 53', 70'; Jaskowski 57'; Mordarski 78'	Report		Stadium: Stadion Gwardii; Attendance: 10,000; Referee: Józef Orliński (Katowice)

2 September 1951 17	Gwardia Kraków	5–0	Ogniwo Kraków	Kraków
16:00 CET (UTC+1)	Gracz 1', 19', 77', (penalty missed) 54'; Kohut 25'; Mordarski 40'	Report		Stadium: Stadion Gwardii; Attendance: 20,000; Referee: Edward Sperling (Łódź)

23 September 1951 18	Gwardia Szczecin	0–5	Gwardia Kraków	Szczecin
		Report	Kohut 43'; Mordarski 53'; Gracz 68', 89'; Kotaba 70'	Stadium: Stadion Arkonii; Attendance: 18,000; Referee: Józef Orliński (Łódź)

29 September 1951 19	Gwardia Kraków	1–1	Włókniarz Kraków	Kraków
15:30 CET (UTC+1)	Gracz 36'	Report	Glajcar 38'	Stadium: Stadion Gwardii; Attendance: 10,000; Referee: Grzegorz Aleksandrowicz (Warsaw)

14 October 1951 20	Unia Chorzów	1–2	Gwardia Kraków	Bytom
	Tim 56'	Report	Gracz 23'; Kohut 30'	Stadium: Stadion Ogniwa; Attendance: 40,000; Referee: Leon Losiak (Kościan)

1 November 1951 21	Gwardia Kraków	2–0	Kolejarz Warsaw	Kraków
11:45 CET (UTC+1)	Gracz 61'; Dudek 68'	Report		Stadium: Stadion Gwardii; Attendance: 8,000; Referee: Jakub Krumholz (Bielsko)

4 November 1951 22	Gwardia Kraków	0–0	Ogniwo Bytom	Kraków
		Report		Stadium: Stadion Gwardii; Attendance: 10,000; Referee: Leon Losiak (Kościan)

== Polish Cup ==
25 March 1951 Round of 32	OWKS Lublin	0–3	Gwardia Kraków	Lublin
		Report	Gracz 70'; Kohut 81'; Mordarski 88'	Stadium: Stadion OWKS-u; Attendance: 3,000; Referee: Julian Brzuchowski (Warsaw)

13 May 1951 Round of 16	Gwardia Kraków	8–0	Włókniarz Pabianice	Kraków
16:30 CET (UTC+1)	Gracz; Jaskowski; Gamaj; Mordarski; Kotaba	Report		Stadium: Stadion Gwardii; Attendance: 5,000; Referee: Trąbałowicz (Opole)

21 August 1951 Quarterfinal	Gwardia Kraków	2–0	Włókniarz Kraków	Kraków
16:00 CET (UTC+1)	Kohut 15'; Gamaj 46'	Report		Stadium: Stadion Gwardii; Attendance: 12,000; Referee: Grzegorz Aleksandrowicz (Warsaw)

9 September 1951 Semifinal	Kolejarz Warsaw	1–2	Gwardia Kraków	Łódź
16:10 CET (UTC+1)	Popiołek 7'	Report	Kohut 24', 81'	Stadium: Stadion ŁKS-u; Attendance: 20,000; Referee: Edmund Andrzejak (Łódź)

16 September 1951 Final	Unia Chorzów	2–0	Gwardia Kraków	Warsaw
	Alszer 7'; Przecherka 83'	Report		Stadium: Stadion Wojska Polskiego; Attendance: 35,000; Referee: Władysław Przybysz (Bydgoszcz)

== Squad, appearances and goals ==
No.	Pos	Nat	Player	Total		Ekstraklasa		Polish Cup	
No.	Pos	Nat	Player	Apps	Goals	Apps	Goals	Apps	Goals
	GK	(Poland) POL	Jerzy Jurowicz	27	0	22+0	0	5+0	0
	GK	(Poland) POL	Zbigniew Lech	1	0	0+0	0	0+1	0
	DF	(Poland) POL	Mieczysław Dudek	27	1	22+0	1	5+0	0
	DF	(Poland) POL	Stanisław Flanek	24	0	20+0	0	4+0	0
	DF	(Poland) POL	Tadeusz Legutko	10	0	7+2	0	1+0	0
	DF	(Poland) POL	Antoni Talik	1	0	0+0	0	1+0	0
	MF	(Poland) POL	Wiesław Gamaj	13	2	9+1	0	3+0	2
	MF	(Poland) POL	Zbigniew Kotaba	22	5	15+3	4	4+0	1
	MF	(Poland) POL	Leszek Łapiński	3	0	3+0	0	0+0	0
	MF	(Poland) POL	Zdzisław Mordarski	27	10	22+0	8	5+0	2
	MF	(Poland) POL	Leszek Snopkowski	17	0	14+0	0	2+1	0
	MF	(Poland) POL	Mieczysław Szczurek	26	0	21+0	0	5+0	0
	MF	(Poland) POL	Kazimierz Ślizowski	1	0	1+0	0	0+0	0
	MF	(Poland) POL	Jan Wapiennik	21	0	16+1	0	4+0	0
	FW	(Poland) POL	Kazimierz Cisowski	3	0	1+1	0	1+0	0
	FW	(Poland) POL	Mieczysław Gracz	26	20	22+0	16	4+0	4
	FW	(Poland) POL	Zbigniew Jaskowski	23	7	16+2	5	4+1	2
	FW	(Poland) POL	Józef Kohut	24	13	19+0	9	4+1	4
	FW	(Poland) POL	Józef Mamoń	12	0	9+0	0	3+0	0
	FW	(Poland) POL	Rudolf Patkolo	5	0	3+0	0	0+2	0
	FW	(Poland) POL	Mieczysław Rupa	1	0	0+1	0	0+0	0

=== Goalscorers ===
Place	Position	Nation	Name	Ekstraklasa	Polish Cup	Total
1	FW	(Poland)	Mieczysław Gracz	16	4	20
2	FW	(Poland)	Józef Kohut	8	4	12
3	MF	(Poland)	Zdzisław Mordarski	9	2	11
4	FW	(Poland)	Zbigniew Jaskowski	5	2	7
5	MF	(Poland)	Zbigniew Kotaba	4	1	5
6	MF	(Poland)	Wiesław Gamaj	0	2	2
7	DF	(Poland)	Mieczysław Dudek	1	0	1
			Totals	43	15	58
