= Jerzy Wyrobek =

Polish footballer and coach

Personal information
- Full name: Jerzy Jan Wyrobek
- Date of birth: 17 December 1949
- Place of birth: Chorzów, Poland
- Date of death: 26 March 2013 (aged 63)
- Place of death: Sosnowiec, Poland
- Position: Defender

Senior career*
Years	Team	Apps	(Gls)
- Stadion Śląski Chorzów
1967–1969	Zagłębie Wałbrzych		
1969–1982	Ruch Chorzów		
1982–1983	TuS Schloß Neuhaus	24	(0)

International career
1970–1977	Poland	15	(1)

Managerial career
- 1987–1990: Ruch Chorzów
- 1995–1996: Ruch Chorzów
- 1997: Sokół Tychy
- 1997–1998: GKS Bełchatów
- 1998–2001: Odra Wodzisław
- 2001–2002: Zagłębie Lubin
- 2002–2003: Pogoń Szczecin
- 2003–2005: Ruch Chorzów
- 2005–2006: KSZO Ostrowiec Świętokrzyski
- 2008: Tur Turek
- 2008–2010: GKS Jastrzębie
- 2010–2011: Tur Turek
- 2011–2012: Zagłębie Sosnowiec
- * Club domestic league appearances and goals

Jerzy Jan Wyrobek (17 December 1949 – 26 March 2013) was a Polish professional footballer and manager.

== Career ==
=== Playing career ===
Jerzy Wyrobek played for Stadion Śląski Chorzów, Zagłębie Wałbrzych, Ruch Chorzów and TuS Schloß Neuhaus. He was also capped 15 times for Poland, scoring one goal.

=== Coaching career ===
Jerzy Wyrobek managed Ruch Chorzów, Sokół Tychy, GKS Bełchatów, Odra Wodzisław, Zagłębie Lubin, Pogoń Szczecin, KSZO Ostrowiec Świętokrzyski, Tur Turek, GKS Jastrzębie and Zagłębie Sosnowiec.

== Honours ==
=== Player ===
Ruch Chorzów

- Ekstraklasa: 1973–74, 1974–75, 1978–79
- Polish Cup: 1973–74

=== Manager ===
Ruch Chorzów

- Ekstraklasa: 1988–89
- Polish Cup: 1995–96
- II liga, group I: 1987–88

Individual

- Polish Coach of the Year: 1989
