= Edward Lorens =

Polish footballer

Personal information
- Date of birth: 28 December 1953 (age 72)
- Place of birth: Żary, Poland
- Height: 1.77 m (5 ft 10 in)
- Position: Midfielder

Senior career*
Years	Team	Apps	(Gls)
1970–1971	Promień Żary		
1971–1977	ROW Rybnik		
1977–1983	Ruch Chorzów		
1983–1985	Wolfsberger AC		
1985	SVL Flavia Solva		
1985–1986	Ruch Chorzów		
1986–1987	APIA Leichhardt	27	(2)

International career
- Poland U18

Managerial career
- 1989: GKS Tychy
- 1989–1991: AKS Mikołów
- 1991–1994: Ruch Chorzów
- 1994–1995: Górnik Zabrze
- 1996: Polonia Bytom
- 1999–2000: Ruch Chorzów
- 2000–2001: Pogoń Szczecin
- 2001: Dyskobolia Grodzisk Wielkopolski
- 2002: Anorthosis Famagusta
- 2003: GKS Katowice
- 2004–2005: Górnik Zabrze
- 2005: Ruch Chorzów
Medal record
Men's football
Representing Poland
UEFA European Under-18 Championship
Third place	1972 Spain
- * Club domestic league appearances and goals

Edward Lorens (born 28 December 1953) is a Polish former professional football manager and player.

== Honours ==
=== Player ===
Ruch Chorzów

- Ekstraklasa: 1978–79

Poland U18

- UEFA European Under-18 Championship third place: 1972

=== Manager ===
Anorthosis Famagusta

- Cypriot Cup: 2002–03
