= Tadeusz Małnowicz =

Polish footballer

Personal information
- Date of birth: 19 October 1953 (age 73)
- Place of birth: Radymno, Poland
- Height: 1.70 m (5 ft 7 in)
- Position: Forward

Senior career*
Years	Team	Apps	(Gls)
- Budowlani Radymno
1974–1975	Wisłoka Dębica		
1975–1976	Siarka Tarnobrzeg		
1976–1978	BKS Stal Bielsko-Biała		
1978–1982	Ruch Chorzów	110	(35)
1982–1983	Szombierki Bytom	27	(5)
1983–1986	LASK		
1986–1987	Vorwärts Steyr		
1987–1988	SV Flavia-Solva Wagna		

International career
1978	Poland	1	(0)
- * Club domestic league appearances and goals

Tadeusz Małnowicz (born 19 October 1953) is a Polish former professional footballer who played as a forward. He made one appearance for the Poland national team in 1978.

== Honours ==
Ruch Chorzów

- Ekstraklasa: 1978–79
