= Tomasz Foszmańczyk =

Polish footballer

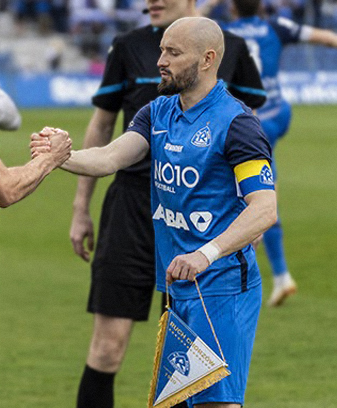
- Foszmańczyk in 2022 with Ruch Chorzów

Personal information
- Full name: Tomasz Foszmańczyk
- Date of birth: 7 February 1986 (age 40)
- Place of birth: Bytom, Poland
- Height: 1.73 m (5 ft 8 in)
- Position: Midfielder

Team information
- Current team: Ruch Chorzów (sporting director)

Youth career
- MOSM Bytom

Senior career*
Years	Team	Apps	(Gls)
2003–2006	Ruch Chorzów	36	(0)
2006	Polonia Bytom	5	(1)
2007	GKS Jastrzębie		
2008–2009	Raków Częstochowa	66	(17)
2010–2011	Ruch Radzionków	44	(2)
2011–2012	Warta Poznań	28	(2)
2012–2013	Korona Kielce	15	(0)
2013–2016	Bruk-Bet Termalica	76	(7)
2016–2018	GKS Katowice	44	(10)
2018–2019	Chojniczanka Chojnice	17	(0)
2019–2024	Ruch Chorzów	135	(20)
- * Club domestic league appearances and goals

Tomasz Foszmańczyk (born 7 January 1986) is a Polish former professional footballer who played as a midfielder. A long-time Ruch Chorzów captain, he retired at the end of the 2023–24 season and became the club's sporting director shortly after.

== Honours ==
Ruch Radzionków

- II liga West: 2009–10

Ruch Chorzów

- III liga, group III: 2020–21
- Polish Cup (Katowice regionals): 2020–21
