= Jan Przecherka =

Polish footballer

Personal information
- Date of birth: 18 February 1922
- Place of birth: Bobrek, Poland
- Date of death: 7 January 1981 (aged 58)
- Place of death: Katowice, Poland
- Height: 1.70 m (5 ft 7 in)
- Position: Forward

Youth career
- 1935–1938: Ruch Hajduki Wielkie

Senior career*
Years	Team	Apps	(Gls)
1938–1939	Ruch Chorzów		
1946–1947	Fraserburgh		
1948–1952	Ruch Chorzów		
1953–1954	Unia Oświęcim		

International career
1948	Poland	4	(0)
- * Club domestic league appearances and goals

Jan Przecherka (18 February 1922 – 7 January 1981) was a Polish footballer who played as a forward.

He earned four caps for the Poland national team in 1948.

== Honours ==
Ruch Chorzów

- Ekstraklasa: 1938, 1952
- Polish Cup: 1950–51
