= Lechosław Olsza =

Polish footballer (born 1949)

Personal information
- Date of birth: 28 February 1949 (age 77)
- Place of birth: Sosnowiec, Poland
- Position: Midfielder

Youth career
- –1966: Zryw Chorzów

Senior career*
Years	Team	Apps	(Gls)
1966–1975	GKS Katowice	250	(6+)
1975–1977	GKS Tychy	34	(0)
1978–1979	GKS Katowice	22	(8)
1979–1980	Rozwój Katowice		
1980–1982	SV St.Veit an der Glan		(1+)

International career
1971	Poland U23	1	(0)
1976	Poland	2	(0)

Managerial career
- 1984–1991: GKS Katowice (assistant)
- 2000–2001: GKS Katowice
- 2003: GKS Katowice (caretaker)
- 2004: GKS Katowice
- 2005: GKS Katowice
- * Club domestic league appearances and goals

Lechosław "Ola" Olsza (born 28 February 1949) is a Polish former football manager and player who played as a midfielder. He is primarily associated with two Upper Silesian football clubs; GKS Katowice and GKS Tychy.

== Club career ==
Olsza was brought to GKS Katowice from Zryw Chorzów by Jerzy Nikiel, debuting in a 1–0 win against Stal Rzeszów. In 1971 he was part of the squad that upset FC Barcelona at Camp Nou in 2–0 win. His greatest successes came with GKS Tychy however, winning the vice-championship in 1976, in what was the golden era for the club; this success earned him a call-up to the national team. In 1979 he spent a year with the then Third Division side Rozwój Katowice before emigrating to Austria for four years, playing alongside other Poles such as Józef Kwiatkowski and Józef Kurzeja.

== International career ==
Olsza played in the 1972 UEFA European Under-23 Championship in a Group 8 match, coming on a substitute against Albania in a 2–1 win on 12 May 1971. He played in two matches for the Poland senior national team in 1976, making his debut against Greece.

== Managerial career ==
In between various non-footballing activities and multiple emigrations from Poland, over the years he has had various roles at GKS Katowice, ranging from first team coach, second coach, assistant manager, manager, director of football, kit man, manual labourer, and stoker.

== Personal life ==
Olsza comes from a sporting family; his father Józef played for Ruch Chorzów, his uncle Kazimierz Pietranek for Stal Sosnowiec. Lechosław's daughter Aleksandra is a former Wimbledon Junior Girls title holder, his wife Barbara a 29-time national tennis champion, and his son a professional sports coach with a doctorate in sports science.
