= Ewald Cebula =

Polish footballer (1917–2004)

Personal information
- Full name: Edward Cebula
- Date of birth: 22 March 1917
- Place of birth: Świętochłowice, German Empire
- Date of death: 1 February 2004 (aged 86)
- Place of death: Chorzów, Poland
- Position: Striker

Senior career*
Years	Team	Apps	(Gls)
1926–1939	Śląsk Świętochłowice		
1939–1941	TuS Schwientochlowitz		
1944–1945	Ancona		
1946–1947	Śląsk Świętochłowice		
1948–1952	Ruch Chorzów		

International career
1939–1952	Poland	5	(0)

Managerial career
- 1952–1954: Ruch Chorzów
- 1959: Ruch Chorzów
- 1960: Ruch Chorzów
- 1962–1963: Górnik Zabrze
- 1963: Górnik Zabrze
- * Club domestic league appearances and goals

Edward Cebula (also known as Ewald; 22 March 1917 – 1 February 2004) was a Polish football player and manager. He played in five matches for the Poland national team as well as one match representing Poland at the Olympic Games.

He started in Śląsk Świętochłowice and his debut in the Poland national team occurred on 4 June 1939 in Warsaw, versus Switzerland (1-1). Then, Cebula played in the last, unforgettable game of interwar Poland - (Warsaw, 27 August 1939, Poland - Hungary 4–2).

His career was put on hold in 1939 following the outbreak of World War II. After the war, Cebula returned to Polish Team, appearing in the 1952 Summer Olympics. The best time in his career was in Ruch Chorzów where he played from 1948. He won Polish championship as a player in 1951, the playing trainer in 1952, and as a trainer in 1953, he had also managed Ruch for a while during the season 1960 when they won championship. He is member of the small group of players who played in national team before and after World War II. He won several more trophies before retirement from football in 1964, winning a title with Górnik Zabrze the previous year.

Following this, he joined forces with Feliks Karolak and became one of the top trainers in Poland.

== Honours ==
=== Player ===
Ruch Chorzów

- Polish Football Championship: 1951
- Polish Cup: 1950–51

=== Manager ===
Ruch Chorzów

- Ekstraklasa: 1952, 1953

Górnik Zabrze

- Ekstraklasa: 1962–63
