= Bogusław Pietrzak =

Polish footballer

Personal information
- Date of birth: 21 May 1958 (age 68)
- Place of birth: Łódź, Poland

Senior career*
Years	Team	Apps	(Gls)
- ŁKS Łódź
- Marymont Warsaw

Managerial career
- 1995–1996: Orzeł Łódź
- 1996–1997: Unia Skierniewice
- 1998: Piotrcovia Piotrków
- 1998–1999: ŁKS Łódź
- 2000: ŁKS Łódź
- 2000–2002: Ruch Chorzów
- 2002–2003: ŁKS Łódź
- 2003: Świt Nowy Dwór
- 2004–2005: Pogoń Szczecin II
- 2005: Pogoń Szczecin
- 2005–2006: Wisła Kraków II
- 2006–2007: Piast Gliwice
- 2008–2009: Ruch Chorzów
- 2018–2019: Garbarnia Kraków
- 2019–2020: Elana Toruń
- * Club domestic league appearances and goals

Bogusław Pietrzak (born 21 May 1958) is a Polish professional football manager and former player.
