= Piotr Piekarczyk =

Polish footballer (born 1958)

Personal information
- Date of birth: 1 October 1958 (age 68)
- Place of birth: Czerwionka, Poland
- Height: 1.84 m (6 ft 0 in)
- Position: Defender

Senior career*
Years	Team	Apps	(Gls)
–1977	Górnik Czerwionka		
1977–1980	ROW Rybnik		
1980–1990	GKS Katowice	227	(18)
1990–1991	GAIS	32	(0)
1992	GKS Katowice	8	(0)

Managerial career
- 1993–1994: GKS Katowice
- 1996–1998: GKS Katowice
- 1999: Górnik Jastrzębie
- 1999–2000: Ruch Radzionków
- 2001–2002: MKS Myszków
- 2002–2006: ROW 1964 Rybnik
- 2006–2008: GKS Katowice
- 2015: GKS Katowice
- 2016–2017: ROW 1964 Rybnik
- * Club domestic league appearances and goals

Piotr Piekarczyk (born 1 October 1958) is a Polish football manager and former player who played as a defender.

== Playing career ==
Piekarczyk played for Polish side GKS Katowice, where he was regarded as one of the club's most important players.

== Style of play ==
Piekarczyk mainly operated as a defender and was described as "played in a modern way, often appeared in the opponents' penalty area, and scored quite a lot of goals".

== Managerial career ==
Piekarczyk managed Polish side GKS Katowice, helping the club achieve promotion.

== Personal life ==
Piekarczyk has been nicknamed "Orzech".

== Honours ==
=== Player ===
GKS Katowice

- Polish Cup: 1985–86, 1992–93

Individual

- Polish Coach of the Year: 1994
