= Mirosław Widuch =

Polish footballer

Personal information
- Date of birth: 29 December 1971 (age 54)
- Place of birth: Mikołów, Poland
- Height: 1.74 m (5 ft 9 in)
- Position: Defender

Youth career
- GKS Tychy

Senior career*
| Years | Team | Apps | (Gls) |
| 1989–1993 | GKS Tychy | | |
| 1993 | Pogoń Szczecin | 0 | (0) |
| 1993–2005 | GKS Katowice | 355 | (1) |
| 2005–2009 | Piast Gliwice | 96 | (0) |
| 2010–2011 | Czarni Piasek | | |
- * Club domestic league appearances and goals

Mirosław Widuch (born 29 December 1971) is a Polish former professional footballer who played as a defender. He spent 12 seasons with GKS Katowice appearing in more than 300 league matches for the club.

== Honours ==
GKS Katowice

- Polish Super Cup: 1995
