= Dariusz Fornalak =

Polish footballer

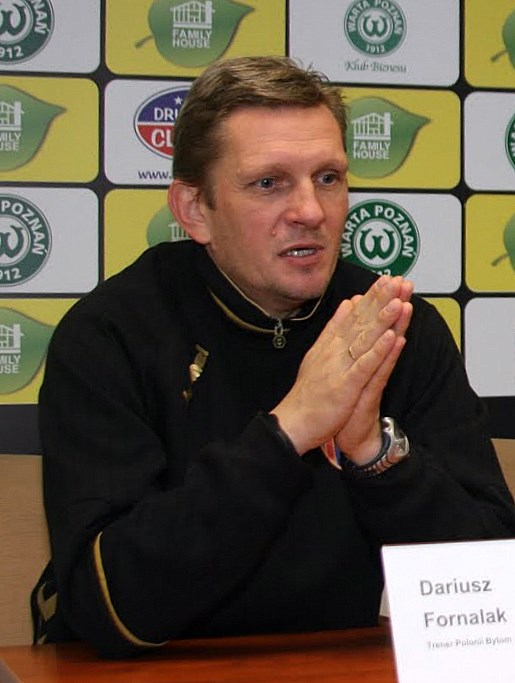

Personal information
- Full name: Dariusz Henryk Fornalak
- Date of birth: 15 October 1965 (age 61)
- Place of birth: Katowice, Poland
- Height: 1.79 m (5 ft 10 in)
- Positions: Defender; midfielder

Youth career
- Stadion Śląski Chorzów

Senior career*
Years	Team	Apps	(Gls)
1983–1997	Ruch Chorzów	298	(12)
1997	Sokół Tychy	7	(0)
1997–1999	Polonia Bytom	36	(5)
1999–2001	Pogoń Szczecin	41	(4)
2001–2003	Arka Gdynia	46	(2)
Total		428	(23)

International career
1989	Poland	2	(0)

Managerial career
- 2003: Rozwój Katowice
- 2005: Ruch Chorzów
- 2006–2007: Polonia Bytom
- 2008: Zagłębie Lubin
- 2009–2010: Piast Gliwice
- 2010: GKS Katowice
- 2011–2012: Polonia Bytom
- 2018: Ruch Chorzów
- * Club domestic league appearances and goals

Dariusz Henryk Fornalak (born 15 October 1965) is a Polish professional football manager and former player.

== Honours ==
Ruch Chorzów

- Ekstraklasa: 1988–89
- Polish Cup: 1995–96
