= Alojzy Łysko =

Polish footballer and coach (1935–2021)

Personal information
- Full name: Alojzy Ludwik Łysko
- Date of birth: 14 April 1935
- Place of birth: Katowice, Second Polish Republic
- Date of death: 22 March 2021 (aged 85)
- Place of death: Siemianowice Śląskie, Poland
- Height: 1.72 m (5 ft 8 in)
- Position: Forward

Senior career*
Years	Team	Apps	(Gls)
1949–1954	KS 20 Katowice		
1954–1958	Siemianowiczanka Siemianowice		
1959–1967	Ruch Chorzów	172	(10)
1967–1973	GKS Katowice	92	(1)

International career
1964	Poland	1	(0)

Managerial career
- 1984: Ruch Chorzów
- 1985–1987: GKS Katowice
- 1987–1988: Zagłębie Lubin
- 1988: Śląsk Wrocław
- 1991–1992: GKS Katowice
- 1992–1993: Górnik Zabrze
- 1996–1997: Cracovia
- 2002–2003: Rozwój Katowice
- * Club domestic league appearances and goals

Alojzy Ludwik Łysko (14 April 1935 – 22 March 2021) was a Polish football player and manager.

== Playing career ==
Łysko played for Siemianowiczanka Siemianowice, Ruch Chorzów and GKS Katowice. He also capped once for Poland, on 10 May 1964 in a friendly 3–1 victory at Ireland.

== Coaching career ==
Łysko managed Ruch Chorzów, GKS Katowice, Zagłębie Lubin, Śląsk Wrocław, Górnik Zabrze, Cracovia, Rozwój Katowice.

== Personal life ==
He died on 22 March 2021 at the age of 85, in Siemianowice Śląskie.

== Honours ==
=== Player ===
Ruch Chorzów

- I liga: 1960

=== Manager ===
GKS Katowice

- Polish Cup: 1985–86, 1990–91
- Polish Super Cup: 1991

Individual

- Polish Coach of the Year: 1986
