= Marek Wleciałowski =

Polish footballer

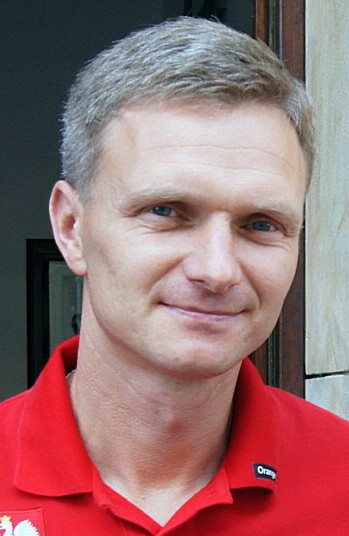
- Wleciałowski in 2012

Personal information
- Date of birth: 31 January 1970 (age 56)
- Place of birth: Chorzów, Poland
- Height: 1.86 m (6 ft 1 in)
- Position: Defender

Team information
- Current team: Ruch Chorzów (assistant)

Senior career*
Years	Team	Apps	(Gls)
1984–1985	Konstal Chorzów		
1985–1988	Stadion Śląski Chorzów		
1988–1989	Wyzwolenie Chorzów		
1989–1994	Ruch Chorzów	64	(5)
1994–1995	Wyzwolenie Chorzów		
1995–2004	Ruch Chorzów	214	(0)

Managerial career
- 2005: Górnik Zabrze
- 2005–2007: Ruch Chorzów
- 2008–2009: Piast Gliwice
- 2013–2014: ROW Rybnik
- 2014–2015: Ruch Chorzów II
- 2015–2017: Ruch Chorzów
- 2018–2019: Ruch Chorzów
- * Club domestic league appearances and goals

Marek Wleciałowski (born 31 January 1970) is a Polish professional football manager and former player who is currently the assistant manager of I liga club Ruch Chorzów.

== Honours ==
=== Player ===
Ruch Chorzów

- Polish Cup: 1995–96
