= Franciszek Tim =

Polish footballer

Personal information
- Date of birth: 4 June 1924
- Place of birth: Hajduki Wielkie, Poland
- Date of death: 9 September 1986 (aged 62)
- Place of death: Chorzów, Poland
- Height: 1.71 m (5 ft 7 in)
- Position: Midfielder

Senior career*
Years	Team	Apps	(Gls)
1946–1949	RKS Batory		
1949–1956	Unia Chorzów	165	(2)
1957–1959	Warta Zawiercie		

International career
1952	Poland	1	(0)

Managerial career
- 1952: Stilon Gorzów Wielkopolski
- 1957–1959: Warta Zawiercie (player-manager)
- 1959: Concordia Knurów
- 1963: Ruch Chorzów
- Naprzód Żernica
- Zagłębie Dąbrowa Górnicza
- Baildon Katowice
- * Club domestic league appearances and goals

Franciszek Tim (born Adolf Thiem, 4 June 1924 – 9 September 1986) was a Polish footballer who played as a midfielder. He played in one match for the Poland national football team in 1952.

== Honours ==
Unia Chorzów

- Polish Football Championship: 1951
- Ekstraklasa: 1952, 1953
- Polish Cup: 1950–51
