= Kazimierz Pietranek =

Polish footballer

Senior career*
Years	Team	Apps	(Gls)
- Unia/Stal Sosnowiec
- * Club domestic league appearances and goals

Kazimierz Pietranek was a Polish professional footballer. In the inter-war period he played for Unia Sosnowiec. He continued to play for Unia during World War II despite the many challenges of war, and he continued to play for the club after the war, then-named Stal Sosnowiec. His nephew Lechosław Olsza went on to become a Polish international footballer.
