= Oskar Brajter =

Polish footballer

Personal information
- Date of birth: 30 May 1929
- Place of birth: Chorzów, Poland
- Date of death: 27 November 2004 (aged 75)
- Place of death: Bochum, Germany
- Height: 1.72 m (5 ft 8 in)
- Position: Forward

Senior career*
Years	Team	Apps	(Gls)
–1949	Azoty Chorzów		
1949–1950	Unia Chorzów		
1950–1952	CWKS Warsaw	25	(13)
1952–1955	Unia Chorzów		
1956	Unia Oświęcim		
1957	Siemianowiczanka		

International career
1950–1952	Poland	4	(0)
- * Club domestic league appearances and goals

Oskar Brajter (30 May 1929 – 27 November 2004) was a Polish footballer who played as a forward. He played in two matches for the Poland national team from 1931 to 1936.
