= GKS Katowice =

Polish association football club

- Full name: GKS GieKSa Katowice S.A.
- Nickname: GieKSa
- Founded: 27 February 1964; 62 years ago
- Ground: Arena Katowice
- Capacity: 15,048
- Coordinates: 50°14′54.7″N 18°58′07.1″E
- Owner: City of Katowice (approx. 90%)
- Chairman: Sławomir Witek
- Manager: Rafał Górak
- League: Ekstraklasa
- 2025–26: Ekstraklasa, 5th of 18
- Website: www.gkskatowice.eu/index
| Home colours | Away colours | Third colours |

GKS Katowice (Polish pronunciation: [ɡʲɛ ka ˈɛs katɔˈvitsɛ]; GKS stands for Górniczy Klub Sportowy, lit. 'Miners' Sports Club') is a Polish men's professional football club based in Katowice. They currently compete in the Ekstraklasa after gaining promotion from the I liga in 2024.

== History ==
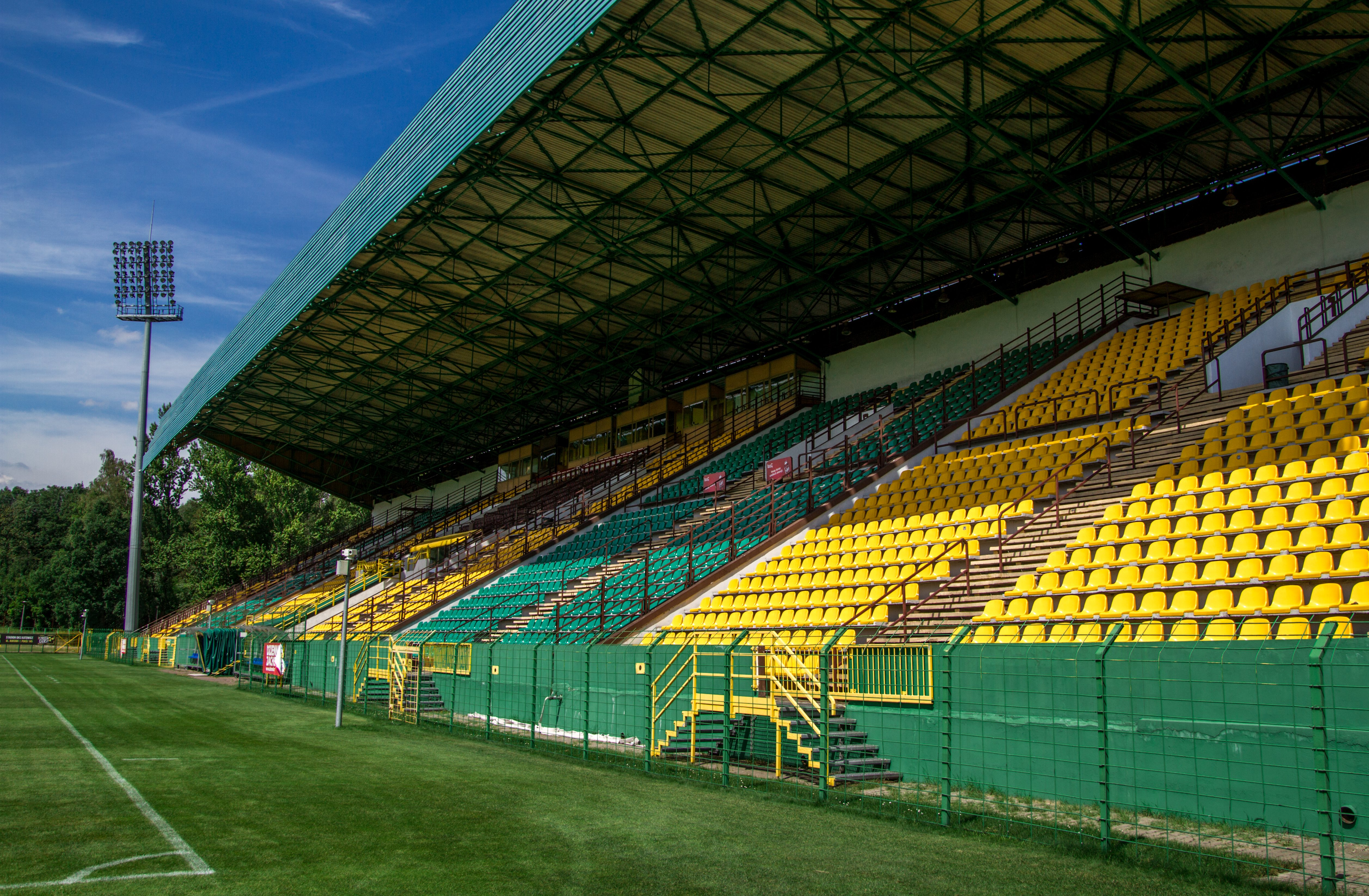
GKS Katowice Stadium, the club's home ground until 2025.

In 1963 in Katowice a special organizational committee was called with the purpose of uniting all the clubs and sporting organizations of the city into one large club which would encompass many disciplines. In mid-1963 Rapid Wełnowiec and Orzeł Wełnowiec merged, creating Rapid/Orzeł. In 1964 Rapid/Orzeł, Górnik Katowice, Koszutka Katowice, Katowicki Klub Łyżwiarski (Katowice Skating Club), Katowicki Klub Sportowy Górnik, Górniczy Klub Żeglarski Szkwał (a sailing club) amongst other clubs from Katowice merged creating GKS Katowice. Four years later on the 9 August 1968, Dąb Katowice also amalgamated with GKS Katowice. GKS Katowice made its debut in Polish football's premier league (now called the Ekstraklasa) on 8 August 1965 when GKS Katowice took on local rivals Górnik Zabrze.

GKS Katowice's debut season in the first division was in the 1965–66 season. In 1971, Katowice was relegated to the second division. The club's problems were eventually overcome, and GKS returned to the first division. From 1982 the club consistently found itself up the top end of the ladder, as well as playing off in several Polish Cup finals. In 1985 GKS Katowice played in its first Polish Cup final but lost in a penalty shootout to Widzew Łódź. The following year GKS played off in a final at Stadion Śląski against Górnik Zabrze; GKS won 4–1. From that moment the city of Katowice began to live and breathe football. The next year GKS finished third and the two following years they were runners-up. In the 1989–90 season GKS again came third, and in the 1991–92 season GKS were runners-up. From 1986 to 1995 to GKS Katowice were four times runners-up in the league, twice the winners of the Polish Super Cup and three-time Polish Cup winners.

The biggest moments for the club and fans were when the team took part in European cups. The first time GKS faced European opposition was in 1970, in the now defunct Inter-Cities Fairs Cup, GKS took on Spanish club Barcelona in a two-legged tie. Katowice lost (2–4 on aggregate), but the fans were proud of their club. The second time GKS took part in European football they showed more and played better football. In the first round of the 1986–87 UEFA Cup Winners Cup, GKS defeated Icelandic side Fram Reykjavík before losing in the second round to Switzerland's Sion. For the next 10 years, GKS Katowice took part in European football. Over the years fans of GKS got to witness their team take on the likes of Sportul Studentsc Bucharest, Rangers, Club Brugge, Galatasaray, Benfica, Aris, Girondins Bordeaux and twice Bayer Leverkusen. GKS's record in European football stands at 10 wins, 7 draws, and 19 losses.

GKS Katowice again fell on hard times during the mining crisis. Following the 1998–99 season, the team was relegated from the Ekstraklasa, but was back in the premier division a year later. Piotr Dziurowicz became chairman who, despite growing debts and financial troubles, kept the team in the first division. In 2003, the team managed to qualify for the UEFA Cup by finishing third in the league under coach Jan Żurek. This was considered by Polish media as one of the biggest surprises ever in the history of the Ekstraklasa. Despite the success, the debts under Piotr Dziurowicz began to grow to a significant sum.

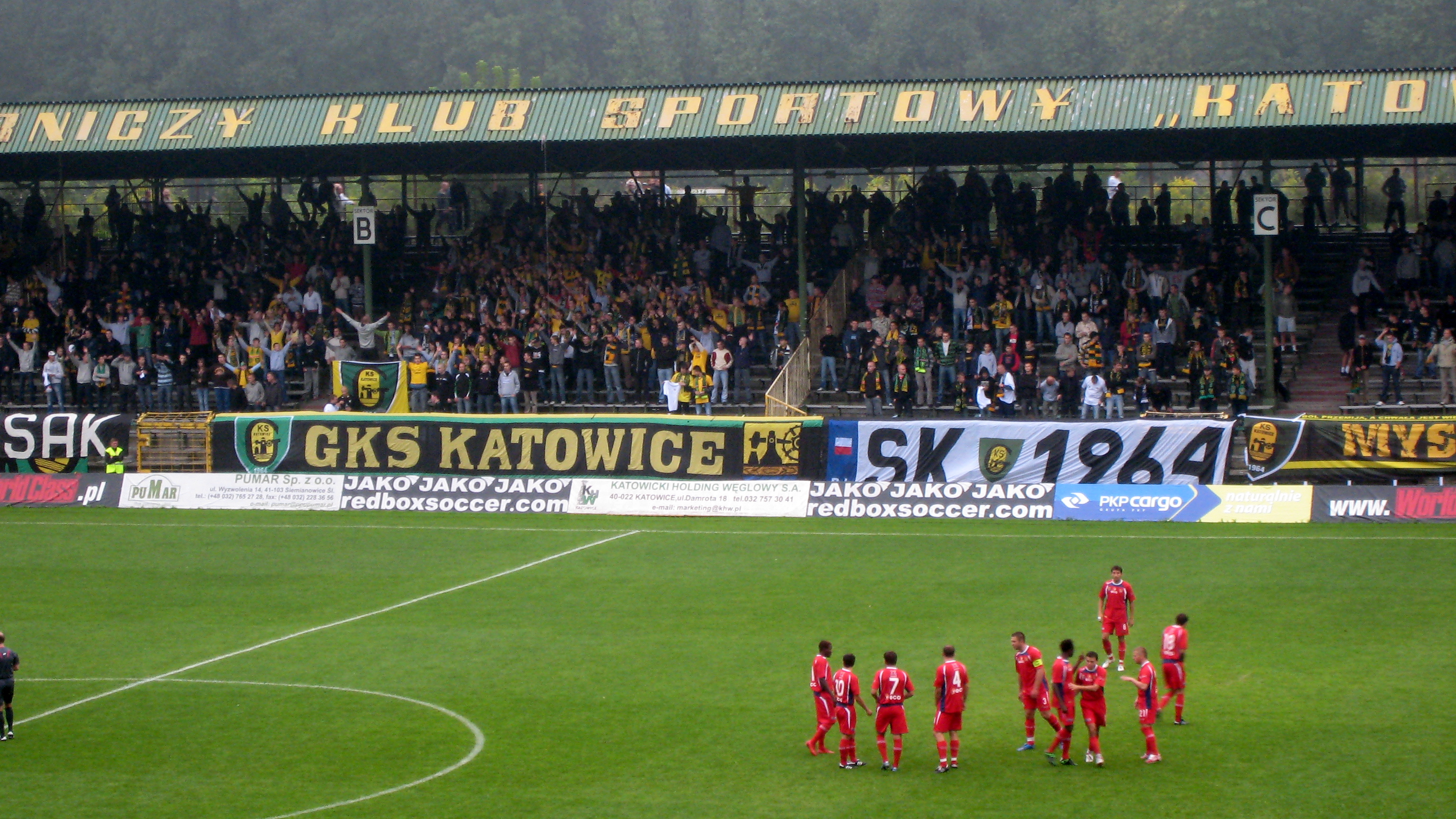
Home game with Odra Opole in the 2008–09 I liga

From 27 March 2003 to 11 June 2004, the club played under the name of its main sponsor Dospel Katowice; this was not taken well by the fans of the club. GKS Katowice Sportowa Spółka Akcyjna finished its reins at the helm of the club in the summer of 2005 after the 2004–05 season where GKS finished 14th (and last) in the Ekstraklasa and was relegated to the second division. The team had to drop to the fourth division due to financial problems and their involvement in the 2003–2005 match-fixing scandal. After the drop to the 4th division, a group of fans known as the "Stowarzyszenie Sympatyków Klubu GKS Katowice" (GKS Katowice Sympathizers Association) took over the helm at the club. In June 2006, the club was promoted to the third division, and in June 2007 the team advanced to the second division, which in 2008 was renamed I liga.

On 26 May 2024, they clinched promotion during the last matchday of the 2023–24 season after a 1–0 away victory over Arka Gdynia, tying them on points, but finishing ahead in the standings on head-to-head difference. They were promoted to Ekstraklasa as runners-up, ending their 19-year absence from the premier division.

On 23 May 2026, GKS Katowice played their last match of the season with Pogoń Szczecin drawing 1–1, passing Legia Warsaw in the league to secure a 5th place finish. This qualified GKS for the UEFA Conference League, marking the club’s return to European competition after a 23-year absence.

In the 2026–27 UEFA Conference League, GKS entered the second qualifying round. After losing 1–2 away to MŠK Žilina, they won the return leg 3–1 at Arena Katowice and advanced 4–3 on aggregate. In the third qualifying round, GKS lost the opening match 0–2 to Hapoel Tel Aviv. Despite winning the return leg 2–1, the club was eliminated 2–3 on aggregate. Overall, GKS recorded two wins and two defeats during the campaign.

== Honours ==
=== Domestic ===
- Ekstraklasa:
  - Runners-up (4): 1987–88, 1988–89, 1991–92, 1993–94
  - Third place (4): 1986–87, 1989–90, 1994–95, 2002–03
- Polish Cup:
  - Winners (3): 1985–86, 1990–91, 1992–93
  - Runners-up (5): 1984–85, 1986–87, 1989–90, 1994–95, 1996–97
- Polish Super Cup:
  - Winners (2): 1991, 1995

=== International ===
- UEFA Cup Winners' Cup Round of 16 (2): 1986–87, 1991–92
- UEFA Cup Round of 16 (1): 1994–95

=== Youth teams ===
- Polish Under-19 Championship
  - Third place (2): 1995, 2002

== Seasons ==
=== Season to season ===
| Season | Tier | Division | Place | Polish Cup |
|---|---|---|---|---|
| 1963–64 | 2 | I liga | 4th | Semi-finals |
| 1964–65 | 2 | I liga | 2nd | Second round |
| 1965–66 | 1 | Ekstraklasa | 10th | Round of 16 |
| 1966–67 | 1 | Ekstraklasa | 7th | Semi-finals |
| 1967–68 | 1 | Ekstraklasa | 8th | Quarter-finals |
| 1968–69 | 1 | Ekstraklasa | 8th | Round of 32 |
| 1969–70 | 1 | Ekstraklasa | 7th | Round of 32 |
| 1970–71 | 1 | Ekstraklasa | 14th | Semi-finals |
| 1971–72 | 2 | I liga | 6th | Quarter-finals |
| 1972–73 | 2 | I liga | 4th | Quarter-finals |
| 1973–74 | 2 | I liga | 4th | Round of 16 |
| 1974–75 | 2 | I liga | 2nd | Quarter-finals |
| 1975–76 | 2 | I liga | 8th | – |
| 1976–77 | 2 | I liga | 3rd | – |
| 1977–78 | 2 | I liga | 1st | First round |
| 1978–79 | 1 | Ekstraklasa | 8th | Round of 32 |
| 1979–80 | 1 | Ekstraklasa | 15th | Quarter-finals |
| 1980–81 | 2 | I liga | 4th | Round of 32 |
| 1981–82 | 2 | I liga | 1st | Third round |
| 1982–83 | 1 | Ekstraklasa | 13th | Third round |
| 1983–84 | 1 | Ekstraklasa | 9th | Round of 16 |
| 1984–85 | 1 | Ekstraklasa | 10th | Runners-up |
| 1985–86 | 1 | Ekstraklasa | 5th | Winners |
| 1986–87 | 1 | Ekstraklasa | 3rd | Runners-up |
| 1987–88 | 1 | Ekstraklasa | 2nd | Round of 16 |
| 1988–89 | 1 | Ekstraklasa | 2nd | Semi-finals |
| 1989–90 | 1 | Ekstraklasa | 3rd | Runners-up |
| 1990–91 | 1 | Ekstraklasa | 4th | Winners |
| 1991–92 | 1 | Ekstraklasa | 2nd | Round of 16 |
| 1992–93 | 1 | Ekstraklasa | 8th | Winners |
| 1993–94 | 1 | Ekstraklasa | 2nd | Semi-finals |

| Season | Tier | Division | Place | Polish Cup |
|---|---|---|---|---|
| 1994–95 | 1 | Ekstraklasa | 3rd | Runners-up |
| 1995–96 | 1 | Ekstraklasa | 11th | Round of 32 |
| 1996–97 | 1 | Ekstraklasa | 4th | Runners-up |
| 1997–98 | 1 | Ekstraklasa | 12th | Quarter-finals |
| 1998–99 | 1 | Ekstraklasa | 16th | Round of 16 |
| 1999–2000 | 2 | I liga | 2nd | Round of 32 |
| 2000–01 | 1 | Ekstraklasa | 8th | First round |
| 2001–02 | 1 | Ekstraklasa | 6th | Round of 32 |
| 2002–03 | 1 | Ekstraklasa | 3rd | Round of 32 |
| 2003–04 | 1 | Ekstraklasa | 10th | Semi-finals |
| 2004–05 | 1 | Ekstraklasa | 14th | Group phase |
| 2005–06 | 4 | IV liga | 1st | – |
| 2006–07 | 3 | III liga | 2nd | – |
| 2007–08 | 2 | I liga | 10th | – |
| 2008–09 | 2 | I liga | 11th | Round of 32 |
| 2009–10 | 2 | I liga | 13th | First round |
| 2010–11 | 2 | I liga | 11th | First round |
| 2011–12 | 2 | I liga | 13th | First round |
| 2012–13 | 2 | I liga | 10th | First round |
| 2013–14 | 2 | I liga | 8th | Round of 16 |
| 2014–15 | 2 | I liga | 8th | First round |
| 2015–16 | 2 | I liga | 4th | Round of 16 |
| 2016–17 | 2 | I liga | 7th | First round |
| 2017–18 | 2 | I liga | 5th | First round |
| 2018–19 | 2 | I liga | 17th | Round of 32 |
| 2019–20 | 3 | II liga | 3rd | Round of 32 |
| 2020–21 | 3 | II liga | 2nd | Round of 64 |
| 2021–22 | 2 | I liga | 8th | Round of 32 |
| 2022–23 | 2 | I liga | 10th | Round of 32 |
| 2023–24 | 2 | I liga | 2nd | First round |
| 2024–25 | 1 | Ekstraklasa | 8th | Round of 32 |
| 2025–26 | 1 | Ekstraklasa | 5th | Semi-finals |

== GKS in Europe ==
| Season | Competition | Round | Opponent | Home | Away | Agg |
|---|---|---|---|---|---|---|
| 1970–71 | Inter-Cities Fairs Cup | 1R | (Spain) Barcelona | 0–1 | 2–3 | 2–4 |
| 1986–87 | UEFA Cup Winners' Cup | 1R | (Iceland) Fram Reykjavik | 1–0 | 3–0 | 4–0 |
| 1986–87 | UEFA Cup Winners' Cup | 2R | (Switzerland) Sion | 2–2 | 0–3 | 2–5 |
| 1987–88 | UEFA Cup | 1R | (Romania) Sportul Studenţesc | 1–2 | 0–1 | 1–3 |
| 1988–89 | UEFA Cup | 1R | (Scotland) Rangers | 2–4 | 0–1 | 2–5 |
| 1989–90 | UEFA Cup | 1R | (Finland) RoPS | 0–1 | 1–1 | 1–2 |
| 1990–91 | UEFA Cup | 1R | (Finland) Turun Palloseura | 3–0 | 1–0 | 4–0 |
| 1990–91 | UEFA Cup | 2R | (Germany) Bayer Leverkusen | 1–2 | 0–4 | 1–6 |
| 1991–92 | UEFA Cup Winners' Cup | 1R | (Scotland) Motherwell | 2–0 | 1–3 | 3–3 (a) |
| 1991–92 | UEFA Cup Winners' Cup | 2R | (Belgium) Club Brugge | 0–1 | 0–3 | 0–4 |
| 1992–93 | UEFA Cup | 1R | (Turkey) Galatasaray | 0–0 | 1–2 | 1–2 |
| 1993–94 | UEFA Cup Winners' Cup | 1R | (Portugal) Benfica | 1–1 | 0–1 | 1–2 |
| 1994–95 | UEFA Cup | Q | (Wales) Inter Cardiff | 6–0 | 2–0 | 8–0 |
| 1994–95 | UEFA Cup | 1R | (Greece) Aris Thessaloniki | 1–0 | 0–1 | 1–1 (4–3 p) |
| 1994–95 | UEFA Cup | 2R | (France) Girondins Bordeaux | 1–0 | 1–1 | 2–1 |
| 1994–95 | UEFA Cup | 3R | (Germany) Bayer Leverkusen | 1–4 | 0–4 | 1–8 |
| 1995–96 | UEFA Cup Winners' Cup | Q | (Armenia) Ararat Yerevan | 2–0 | 0–2 | 2–2 (4–5 p) |
| 2003–04 | UEFA Cup | Q | (North Macedonia) Cementarnica 55 | 1–1 | 0–0 | 1–1 (a) |
| 2026–27 | UEFA Conference League | 2QR | (Slovakia) Žilina | 3–1 | 1–2 | 4–3 |
| 2026–27 | UEFA Conference League | 3QR | (Israel) Hapoel Tel Aviv | 2–1 | 0–2 | 2–3 |

== Players ==
=== Current squad ===
As of 9 September 2026

Note: Flags indicate national team as defined under FIFA eligibility rules; some limited exceptions apply. Players may hold more than one non-FIFA nationality.

| No. | Pos. | Nation | Player |
|---|---|---|---|
| 1 | GK | POL | Maciej Kikolski (on loan from Widzew Łódź) |
| 3 | DF | POL | Aleksander Paluszek |
| 4 | DF | POL | Arkadiusz Jędrych (captain) |
| 5 | MF | NED | Jesse Bosch |
| 6 | DF | POL | Lukas Klemenz |
| 7 | MF | POL | Mateusz Wdowiak |
| 8 | MF | ESP | Borja Galán |
| 10 | MF | POL | Marcel Wędrychowski |
| 11 | MF | POL | Adrian Błąd |
| 13 | GK | POL | Rafał Strączek |
| 14 | DF | NOR | Marius Olsen |
| 15 | MF | NOR | Eman Markovic |
| 17 | FW | BLR | Ilya Shkurin |
| 19 | MF | POL | Kacper Łukasiak |
| 21 | FW | POL | Jakub Kokosiński |

| No. | Pos. | Nation | Player |
|---|---|---|---|
| 22 | MF | POL | Sebastian Milewski |
| 23 | DF | POL | Marcin Wasielewski |
| 26 | MF | POL | Damian Rasak (on loan from Újpest) |
| 27 | MF | POL | Bartosz Nowak |
| 30 | DF | POL | Alan Czerwiński |
| 31 | MF | POL | Szymon Bartlewicz |
| 33 | GK | POL | Patryk Szczuka |
| 34 | GK | POL | Wojciech Pańkowski |
| 35 | GK | POL | Wojciech Monica |
| 55 | DF | ESP | Pau Resta |
| 68 | MF | POL | Bartosz Wolski |
| 77 | MF | POL | Mateusz Kowalczyk |
| 87 | GK | POL | Gabriel Kobylak |
| 97 | MF | SVK | Erik Jirka |
| 99 | FW | SVK | Adam Zreľák |

=== Out on loan ===
Note: Flags indicate national team as defined under FIFA eligibility rules; some limited exceptions apply. Players may hold more than one non-FIFA nationality.

| No. | Pos. | Nation | Player |
|---|---|---|---|
| 25 | DF | POL | Łukasz Trepka (at Pogoń Siedlce until 30 June 2027) |

=== Retired numbers ===
Note: Flags indicate national team as defined under FIFA eligibility rules; some limited exceptions apply. Players may hold more than one non-FIFA nationality.

| No. | Pos. | Nation | Player |
|---|---|---|---|
| 9 | FW | POL | Jan Furtok (1979–88, 1995–98) |

=== Notable former players ===
- (Poland) Jan Furtok
- (Poland) Piotr Piekarczyk
- (Poland) Roman Szewczyk
- (Niger) Moussa Yahaya
- (Poland) Andrzej Rudy
- (Poland) Piotr Świerczewski
- (Poland) Janusz Jojko
- (Poland) Marek Koniarek
- (Poland) Mirosław Kubisztal
- (Poland) Marek Świerczewski
- (Poland) Mirosław Sznaucner
- (Poland) Sławomir Wojciechowski
- (Poland) Adam Ledwoń
- (Bosnia and Herzegovina) Admir Adžem
- (Georgia (country)) Gija Guruli
- (Poland) Bartosz Karwan
- (Poland) Paweł Brożek
- (Poland) Kazimierz Węgrzyn
- (Poland) Mirosław Widuch
- (Poland) Dariusz Rzeźniczek

== Managers ==
- (Poland) Antoni Brzeżańczyk (1964–65)
- (Poland) Jerzy Nikiel (1965–66)
- (Hungary) Tibor Kemény (1966–67)
- (Poland) Tadeusz Foryś
- (Poland) Augustyn Dziwisz
- (Poland) Stanisław Oślizło (1979–80)
- (Poland) Władysław Jan Żmuda (1980–81)
- (Poland) Jerzy Nowok (1981–83)
- (Poland) Jacek Góralczyk (1983)
- (Poland) Zdzisław Podedworny (1984–85)
- (Poland) Alojzy Łysko (1985–87)
- (Poland) Władysław Jan Żmuda (1987–90)
- (Poland) Orest Lenczyk (1990–91)
- (Poland) Alojzy Łysko (1991–92)
- (Austria) Adolf Blutsch (1992–93)
- (Poland) Piotr Piekarczyk (1993–94)
- (Poland) Jacek Góralczyk (1995)
- (Poland) Orest Lenczyk (1995–96)
- (Poland) Piotr Piekarczyk (1996–98)
- (Poland) Marek Koniarek (1998–99)
- (Poland) Paweł Kowalski (2000)
- (Poland) Bogusław Kaczmarek (2000–01)
- (Poland) Janusz Białek (2001–02)
- (Poland) Jan Żurek (2002–03)
- (Poland) Edward Lorens (2003)
- (Poland) Jan Żurek (2003–04)
- (Poland) Lechosław Olsza (2004)
- (Poland) Wojciech Borecki (2004)
- (Poland) Mieczysław Broniszewski (2004)
- (Poland) Jan Furtok (2005)
- (Poland) Lechosław Olsza (2005)
- (Poland) Henryk Górnik (2005–06)
- (Poland) Piotr Piekarczyk (2006–08)
- (Poland) Adam Nawałka (2008–09)
- (Poland) Robert Moskal (2010)
- (Poland) Dariusz Fornalak (2010)
- (Poland) Wojciech Stawowy (2010–11)
- (Poland) Rafał Górak (2011–13)
- (Poland) Kazimierz Moskal (2013–14)
- (Poland) Artur Skowronek (2014–15)
- (Poland) Piotr Piekarczyk (2015)
- (Poland) Jerzy Brzęczek (2015–17)
- (Poland) Janusz Jojko (2017)
- (Poland) Piotr Mandrysz (2017–18)
- (Poland) Jacek Paszulewicz (2018)
- (Poland) Jakub Dziółka (caretaker) (2018)
- (Poland) Dariusz Dudek (2018–2019)
- (Poland) Rafał Górak (2019–present)

== See also ==
- Football in Poland
- List of football teams
- Champions' Cup/League
- UEFA Cup
- Ruch Chorzów (rivalry)
- Górnik Zabrze (rivalry/friendly)
- Banik Ostrava (friendly)
