= 1978–79 Ekstraklasa =

53rd season of top-tier football league in Poland

I liga
- Season: 1978–79
- Dates: 27 July 1978 – 10 June 1979
- Champions: Ruch Chorzów (13th title)
- Relegated: Pogoń Szczecin; Gwardia Warsaw
- European Cup: Ruch Chorzów
- Cup Winners' Cup: Arka Gdynia
- UEFA Cup: Widzew Łódź; Stal Mielec
- Matches: 240
- Goals: 524 (2.18 per match)
- Top goalscorer: Kazimierz Kmiecik (17 goals)
- Biggest home win: Ruch 6–0 ŁKS
- Biggest away win: Pogoń 1–4 Szombierki; Wisła 1–4 ŁKS; Polonia 0–3 Odra; Arka 0–3 Stal
- Highest scoring: Legia 3–5 Odra; Gwardia 4–4 Szombierki
- Highest attendance: 30,000
- Total attendance: 2,599,440
- Average attendance: 10,831 ▼18.8%

The 1978–79 I liga was the 53rd season of the Polish Football Championship and the 45th season of the I liga, the top Polish professional league for association football clubs, since its establishment in 1927. The league was operated by the Polish Football Association (PZPN).

The champions were Ruch Chorzów, who won their 13th Polish title.

== Competition modus ==
The season started on 27 July 1978 and concluded on 10 June 1979 (autumn-spring league). The season was played as a round-robin tournament. The team at the top of the standings won the league title. A total of 16 teams participated, 14 of which competed in the league during the 1977–78 season, while the remaining two were promoted from the 1977–78 II liga. Each team played a total of 30 matches, half at home and half away, two games against each other team. Teams received two points for a win and one point for a draw.

== League table ==
Pos	Team	Pld	W	D	L	GF	GA	GD	Pts	Qualification or relegation
1	Ruch Chorzów (C)	30	16	7	7	44	27	+17	39	Qualification to European Cup first round
2	Widzew Łódź	30	14	11	5	37	26	+11	39	Qualification to UEFA Cup first round
3	Stal Mielec	30	14	8	8	43	27	+16	36	Qualification to UEFA Cup first round
4	Szombierki Bytom	30	11	13	6	42	27	+15	35	
5	Odra Opole	30	14	6	10	42	28	+14	34	
6	Legia Warsaw	30	10	13	7	32	28	+4	33	
7	Lech Poznań	30	11	8	11	34	38	−4	30	
8	GKS Katowice	30	10	10	10	28	36	−8	30	
9	Zagłębie Sosnowiec	30	7	15	8	22	25	−3	29	
10	Śląsk Wrocław	30	11	7	12	23	27	−4	29	
11	Arka Gdynia	30	11	7	12	29	35	−6	29	Qualification to Cup Winners' Cup first round
12	ŁKS Łódź	30	9	8	13	30	36	−6	26	
13	Wisła Kraków	30	9	8	13	42	43	−1	26	
14	Polonia Bytom	30	9	6	15	23	39	−16	24	
15	Pogoń Szczecin (R)	30	7	8	15	31	41	−10	22	Relegated to II liga
16	Gwardia Warsaw (R)	30	5	9	16	22	41	−19	19	Relegated to II liga

Source: 90minut.pl (in Polish)
(C) Champions; (R) Relegated

== Results ==
Home \ Away	ARK	KAT	GWA	LPO	LEG	ŁKS	OOP	POG	BYT	RUC	STA	SZB	ŚLĄ	WID	WIS	ZSO
Arka Gdynia		0–0	1–0	3–2	3–0	2–0	0–1	2–0	4–0	1–0	0–3	0–1	1–0	1–1	4–2	0–0
GKS Katowice	1–0		2–1	0–0	1–1	1–0	1–0	2–1	2–0	2–0	0–0	0–1	2–0	1–2	1–1	2–2
Gwardia Warsaw	1–0	2–0		1–1	0–0	2–2	0–0	0–0	0–2	2–1	1–3	4–4	0–0	1–2	3–1	0–1
Lech Poznań	0–0	3–1	3–0		2–1	1–3	2–1	0–0	2–0	1–2	1–0	2–2	1–0	1–1	2–0	1–0
Legia Warsaw	0–0	2–2	0–0	3–1		1–0	3–5	3–1	3–0	1–1	1–1	0–0	2–0	2–0	0–0	0–0
ŁKS Łódź	0–0	0–1	0–1	2–0	0–0		0–2	2–1	1–0	0–2	2–0	2–0	3–0	1–1	3–1	1–1
Odra Opole	2–3	1–2	5–0	3–1	2–1	1–0		1–0	1–2	3–1	3–2	2–2	0–1	0–0	0–0	2–0
Pogoń Szczecin	4–0	3–0	2–1	3–0	2–3	1–1	1–0		1–1	2–2	1–1	1–4	1–0	1–1	3–0	1–2
Polonia Bytom	1–1	1–0	1–0	1–1	0–1	2–0	0–3	3–1		0–1	0–1	1–0	3–0	2–3	1–0	0–0
Ruch Chorzów	1–0	1–1	1–0	1–0	3–0	6–0	0–1	1–0	2–1		1–1	2–1	3–1	1–1	3–0	2–1
Stal Mielec	5–2	4–0	2–0	0–2	1–0	4–1	2–0	2–0	0–0	1–2		3–1	1–0	1–1	2–1	1–1
Szombierki Bytom	0–1	3–0	1–0	1–1	0–0	1–1	0–0	3–0	3–0	1–1	1–0		1–1	4–1	1–1	3–1
Śląsk Wrocław	2–0	2–1	0–0	3–0	0–1	1–0	2–1	0–0	2–0	2–1	1–0	0–2		0–1	2–0	1–1
Widzew Łódź	4–0	3–0	1–0	1–2	1–0	1–0	1–0	1–0	1–0	0–1	1–1	1–0	1–1		2–1	1–1
Wisła Kraków	3–0	1–1	3–1	4–1	2–2	1–4	1–1	4–0	4–0	3–1	3–0	1–1	0–1	2–1		2–1
Zagłębie Sosnowiec	1–0	1–1	2–1	1–0	0–1	1–1	0–1	1–0	1–1	0–0	0–1	0–0	0–0	1–1	1–0	

Source: 90minut.pl (in Polish)
Legend: Blue = home team win; Yellow = draw; Red = away team win.

== Top goalscorers ==
Rank	Player	Club	Goals
1	(Poland) Kazimierz Kmiecik	Wisła Kraków	17
2	(Poland) Tadeusz Małnowicz	Ruch Chorzów	15
2	(Poland) Andrzej Szarmach	Stal Mielec	15
4	(Poland) Roman Ogaza	Szombierki Bytom	13
5	(Poland) Alfred Bolcek	Odra Opole	11
5	(Poland) Jerzy Dworczyk	Zagłębie Sosnowiec	11
7	(Poland) Tomasz Korynt	Arka Gdynia	10
7	(Poland) Leszek Wolski	Pogoń Szczecin	10
9	(Poland) Jan Benigier	Ruch Chorzów	9
9	(Poland) Witold Nowak	ŁKS Łódź	9

== Attendances ==
#	Club	Average
1	Arka Gdynia	16,933
2	Legia Warszawa	16,600
3	Ruch Chorzów	16,400
4	Lech Poznań	15,867
5	Widzew Łódź	14,667
6	Wisła Kraków	12,733
7	Stal Mielec	12,533
8	Śląsk Wrocław	10,800
9	Pogoń Szczecin	10,333
10	Odra Opole	9,800
11	ŁKS	9,733
12	Katowice	6,500
13	Szombierki Bytom	6,400
14	Polonia Bytom	6,133
15	Zagłębie Sosnowiec	4,344
16	Gwardia Warszawa	3,520

== Bibliography ==
- Gowarzewski, Andrzej (2000). Encyklopedia Piłkarska Fuji. Liga Polska. O tytuł mistrza Polski 1920–2000 (in Polish). GiA, Katowice. ISBN 83-88232-02-9.
