= 1952 Ekstraklasa =

26th season of top-tier football league in Poland

Liga
- Season: 1952
- Champions: Ruch Chorzów (7th title)
- Top goalscorer: Gerard Cieślik (11 goals)

Statistics of Ekstraklasa for the 1952 season.

== Overview ==
It was contested by 12 teams, and Ruch Chorzów won the championship.

== Regular season ==
=== Group 1 ===
Pos	Team	Pld	W	D	L	GF	GA	GD	Pts	Qualification or relegation
1	Ruch Chorzów	10	5	2	3	19	14	+5	12	Qualification to final
2	KS Cracovia	10	4	3	3	13	11	+2	11	
3	Lech Poznań	10	4	2	4	17	15	+2	10	
4	Lechia Gdańsk	10	4	2	4	16	21	−5	10	
5	AKS Chorzów	10	4	1	5	12	13	−1	9	
6	Polonia Warsaw (R)	10	3	2	5	16	19	−3	8	Relegated to II liga

Source: 90minut.pl (in Polish)
(R) Relegated

==== Results ====
Home \ Away	AKS	CRA	LGD	LPO	PWA	RUC
AKS Chorzów		0–0	2–0	3–4	2–0	0–4
KS Cracovia	1–0		2–2	4–0	3–0	1–0
Lechia Gdańsk	1–0	5–0		3–1	1–0	0–3
Lech Poznań	0–2	0–0	6–0		2–0	3–1
Polonia Warsaw	1–3	2–1	3–3	2–1		5–0
Ruch Chorzów	2–0	2–1	4–1	0–0	3–3	

Source: 90minut.pl (in Polish)
Legend: Blue = home team win; Yellow = draw; Red = away team win.

=== Group 2 ===
Pos	Team	Pld	W	D	L	GF	GA	GD	Pts	Qualification or relegation
1	Polonia Bytom	10	5	4	1	18	7	+11	14	Qualification to final
2	Wisła Kraków	10	5	2	3	11	12	−1	12	
3	Legia Warsaw	10	4	2	4	24	14	+10	10	
4	Wawel Kraków	10	2	5	3	11	11	0	9	
5	Górnik Radlin	10	3	2	5	11	16	−5	8	
6	ŁKS Łódź (R)	10	3	1	6	9	24	−15	7	Relegated to II liga

Source: 90minut.pl (in Polish)
(R) Relegated

==== Results ====
Home \ Away	GRA	LEG	ŁKS	BYT	WAW	WIS
Górnik Radlin		4–1	1–0	1–2	2–1	0–0
Legia Warsaw	4–0		7–0	1–4	1–2	3–0
ŁKS Łódź	2–1	1–5		1–1	1–0	3–0
Polonia Bytom	3–0	0–0	4–1		1–1	2–0
Wawel Kraków	1–1	1–1	2–0	1–1		2–2
Wisła Kraków	2–1	2–1	3–0	1–0	1–0	

Source: 90minut.pl (in Polish)
Legend: Blue = home team win; Yellow = draw; Red = away team win.

== Final Games ==
- Ruch Chorzów 7-0 Polonia Bytom
- Polonia Bytom 0-0 Ruch Chorzów

== Top goalscorers ==
Rank	Player	Club	Goals
1	(Poland) Gerard Cieślik	Ruch Chorzów	11
2	(Poland) Oskar Brajter	Legia Warsaw	8
3	(Poland) Teodor Anioła	Lech Poznań	7
3	(Poland) Zdzisław Mordarski	Wisła Kraków	7
3	(Poland) Wacław Sąsiadek	Legia Warsaw	7
6	(Poland) Tadeusz Glimas	Cracovia	6
7	(Poland) Janusz Gogolewski	Lech Poznań	5
7	(Poland) Robert Gronowski	Lechia Gdańsk	5
7	(Poland) Ginter Powała	AKS Chorzów	5
