= Ruch Chorzów =

Polish association football club

- Full name: Klub Sportowy Ruch Chorzów
- Nicknames: Niebiescy (The Blues), Niebieska eRka (The Blue R), HKS (from Hajducki Klub Sportowy)
- Founded: 20 April 1920; 106 years ago
- Ground: Ruch Chorzów Stadium; Silesian Stadium
- Capacity: 9,300; 55,211
- Owner(s): City of Chorzów (33,51%); Aleksander Kurczyk (18,07%); Zdzisław Bik (16,82%); Carbonex sp. z o.o. (7,81%) other shareholders (23,79%)
- Chairman: Seweryn Siemianowski
- Manager: Waldemar Fornalik
- League: I liga
- 2025–26: I liga, 7th of 18
- Website: www.ksruch.com
Home colours	Away colours	Third colours

Ruch Chorzów (Polish pronunciation: [ˈrux ˈxɔʐuf]) is a Polish professional football club based in Chorzów, Upper Silesia. It is one of the most successful football teams in Poland, having won fourteen Polish Championships, and the Polish Cup three times. As of the 2026–27 season, they compete in the I liga.

Ruch's home venue is the Ruch Chorzów Stadium, with a capacity of 9,300 seats. As it is currently under renovation, Ruch temporarily hosts their games at the Silesian Stadium in Chorzów with a capacity of 55,211 seats. The club is known for its Silesian identity. Ruch also operates a women's handball team, who have won nine national titles, and a men's futsal department.

== Names ==
Years	Name
1920–1923	KS Ruch Bismarkhuta
1923	KS Ruch Wielkie Hajduki
1923–c. 1924	KS Ruch BBC Wielkie Hajduki
c. 1924–1939	KS Ruch Wielkie Hajduki
1939–1940	KS Ruch Chorzów
1940–1945 (as a part of German Gauliga)	Bismarckhütter SV 99
1945–1948	KS Ruch Chorzów
1948–1949	ZKS Ruch Chorzów
1949	KS Chemik Chorzów
1949–1955	ZS Unia Chorzów
1955–c. 1956	ZKS Unia-Ruch Chorzów
c. 1956–2002	KS Ruch Chorzów
2002–2004	KS Ruch w Chorzowie
2004–2008	Ruch Chorzów SSA
2008–2017	Ruch Chorzów SA
2017–2018	Ruch Chorzów SA w restrukturyzacji
2018–current	Ruch Chorzów SA

== History ==
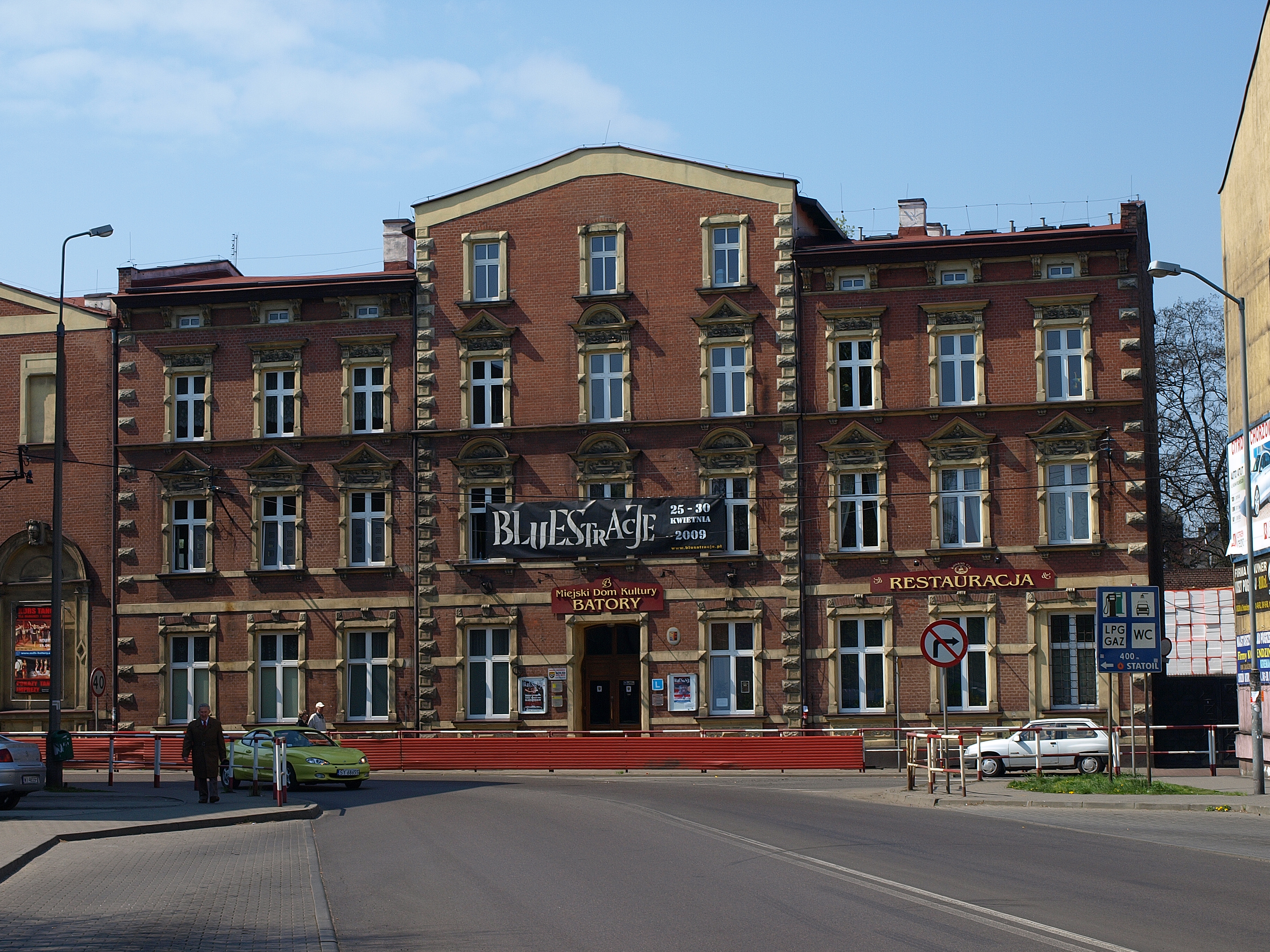
Municipal House of Culture "Batory" in Chorzów, place where the club was founded

The club was founded on 20 April 1920 in Bismarkhuta (German Bismarckhütte, historically Hajduki), one of the many heavily industrialised municipalities in the eastern part of Upper Silesia, a disputed province between Poland and Germany. The main incentive was an appeal of the Polish Plebiscite Committee a few months earlier that led to creation of around one hundred sport associations. It took place in between the first and second Silesian Uprisings, to which the name Ruch is a supposed cover reference. The Polish word ruch is however also a common noun for movement, not as strongly associated with Polishness as names of many other clubs established after the appeal (like Polonia, Powstaniec etc.). On the other hand, the club's first match, a 3–1 win against Orzeł Józefowiec, was played on 3 May 1920, the day of the first Polish Constitution. After the Upper Silesia plebiscite and the third Silesian Uprising in 1921 Bismarkhuta became part of Poland and the Silesian Voivodeship. The municipality was renamed to Wielkie Hajduki on 1 January 1923, hence the club was known as Ruch Wielkie Hajduki until another merger into the town Chorzów (created in 1934 from amalgamation of Królewska Huta, Chorzów and Hajduki Nowe) in the early 1939, with a short period in 1923 after the fusion with the older local German club Bismarckhütter Ballspiel Club, when it was known as Ruch BBC Wielkie Hajduki. After the merger the team played its games on the former BBC's pitch known as na Kalinie. The popular nickname of the club Niebiescy (The Blues) clung to the team already in the 1920s.

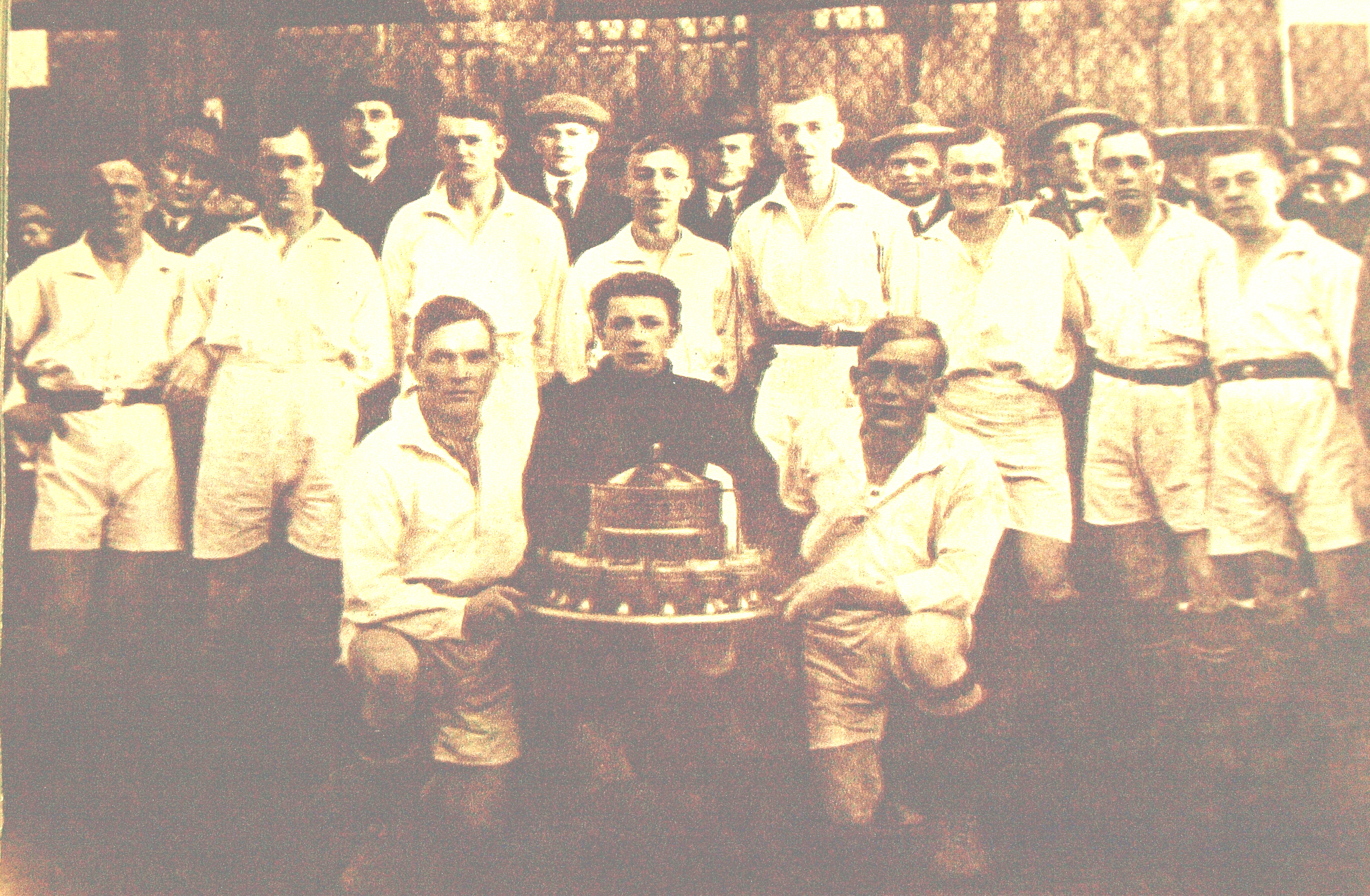
Ruch Wielkie Hajduki, Silesian Vice-Champions in 1924

In autumn of 1920 Ruch won the promotion to the nascent Silesian Klasa A (see also: Lower Level Football Leagues in Interwar Poland). The Blues were third out of fourteen teams in its first season, unfinished due to the third Silesian Uprising. The next year Ruch won the championship of the Silesian Klasa A and represented the region in the 1922 Polish Football Championship. In 1924 the club finished second in the regional top league, behind AKS Królewska Huta, before 1924 considered German and known as Verein für Rasenspiele Königshütte, the first team Ruch had developed a local rivalry with. In 1925 the Silesian Klasa A did not play, instead Stanisław Flieger's Cup took place, ultimately won by Ruch, which gave the side a start in the only interwar Polish Cup competition in 1926. On 4 July 1926 Józef Sobota, before 1920 a BBC's player, became the first Ruch's player (and the fourth from Upper Silesia) of the Poland national team, who also scored a goal (against Estonia). In the same year, two weeks after the national Cup Ruch won for the second time the regional Klasa A, firmly establishing itself as one of the strongest football clubs in this densely populated region and as such it was among the founding clubs of the Polish national league in 1927. In 1933 Ruch won its first Championship as the first side from Silesia, with all the players who were born not further as a few kilometers from the na Kalinie pitch. Thus the first truly golden era began. The local steel mill (since 1934 known as Huta Batory) began to financially support the side. In the winter of 1933 the most noteworthy players such as Edmund Giemsa, Teodor Peterek and Gerard Wodarz were joined by legendary Ernst Wilimowski, bought from 1. FC Kattowitz, who with Peterek and Wodarz were collectively nicknamed the three kings and helped to win another 4 championships (1934, 1935, 1936, 1938). On 1 November 1934 the club, as the last in the league, employed its first coach, Gustav Wieser. The side was also a leader in the unfinished season 1939. The successes rendered the club the most popular in the voivodeship and accelerated building of the new stadium in the years 1934–1935, the current Ruch Chorzów Stadium.

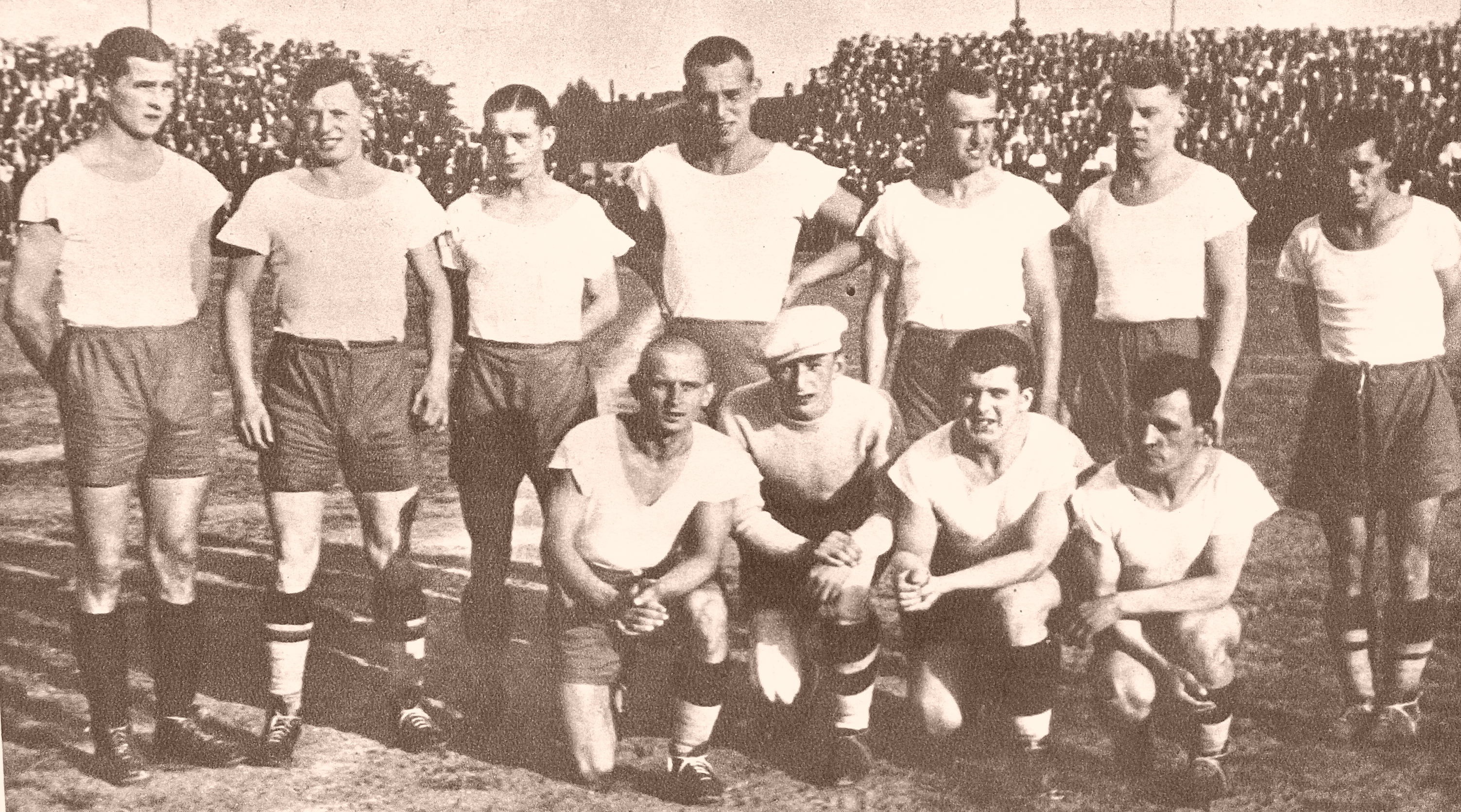
Ruch in 1938

During the World War II German occupation of Poland in 1939, the club was officially discontinued but unofficially was simply renamed Bismarckhütter SV 99 and joined the Gauliga Oberschlesien in 1941. The club was officially re-established after the war. In 1947 Ruch won the regional championships. In 1948, under communist pressure (Stalinisation), the club was renamed Unia Chorzów, in 1955 it became Unia-Ruch, and finally in 1956 returned to the name Ruch. As Unia the club finished third in the first season of the reactivated national league in 1948 and in 1950 as the second team. In 1951 the club won the reactivated Polish Cup edition and were rewarded with the title of the National Champions (even though they were only sixth in the league). The next two years the club also won the title, first in 1952 after final against Polonia Bytom, another local bitter rival, and in 1953 after finishing the league on the top position. The most renowned player of that era was Gerard Cieślik, who dedicated his whole life to the club and became its icon.

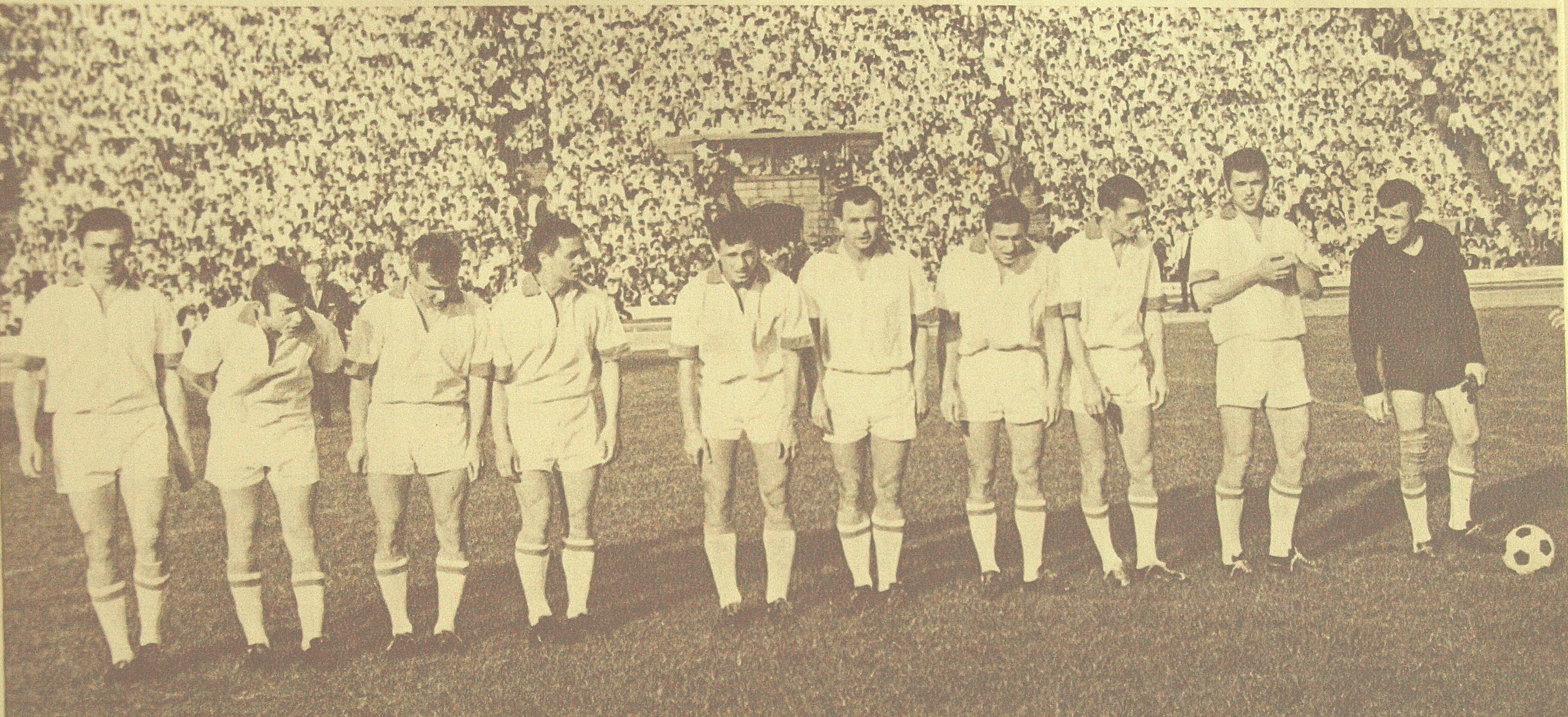
Ruch in 1968

The years 1957-1966 are considered a lost decade, completely overshadowed by the successes of the new biggest regional rival, Górnik Zabrze, even though the club won the championships in 1960. A record of its kind in the national football history as the team consisted of only 14 players, 11 of whom originated in the town of Chorzów. The turn of the tide came in the season 1967–68 when Ruch won the 10th championship title breaking Górnik Zabrze's streak of five consecutive titles. Another golden era for the Blues arrived in the early 1970s with Michal Vičan as a coach. In 1972–73 the club finished second, in 1973–74 they won the only double in the history (the championship and the cup) and advanced up to the quarter-finals of the UEFA Cup. In 1974–75 they again won the league and qualified to the quarter-finals of the European Cup. The most praised players of that times were Bronisław Bula, Zygmunt Maszczyk and Joachim Marx.

These successes were followed by a bad financial plight and mediocre results until 1978–79, when the club won its 13th Championship title. In the 1980s the club was one of the poorest in the national league. The worst came in the season 1986–87, when the club, the only one in the country which so far played all the seasons of the official national top league, was relegated to the second tier. Especially shifty were the circumstances of the relegation decider, against Lechia Gdańsk, when Ruch's goalkeeper Janusz Jojko scored an infamous and bizarre own goal and the club lost the game 1–2. After one year Ruch returned to the top flight as winners of the seconed league and won the 14th Championship title, as the second freshly-promoted club in the national history (the first was Cracovia in 1937), a feat, especially as it was still one of the poorest clubs in the top tier and over half of the players were home-grown, including e.g. Dariusz Gęsior and the most renowned Krzysztof Warzycha, who was also, with 24 goals, the top scorer of the season.

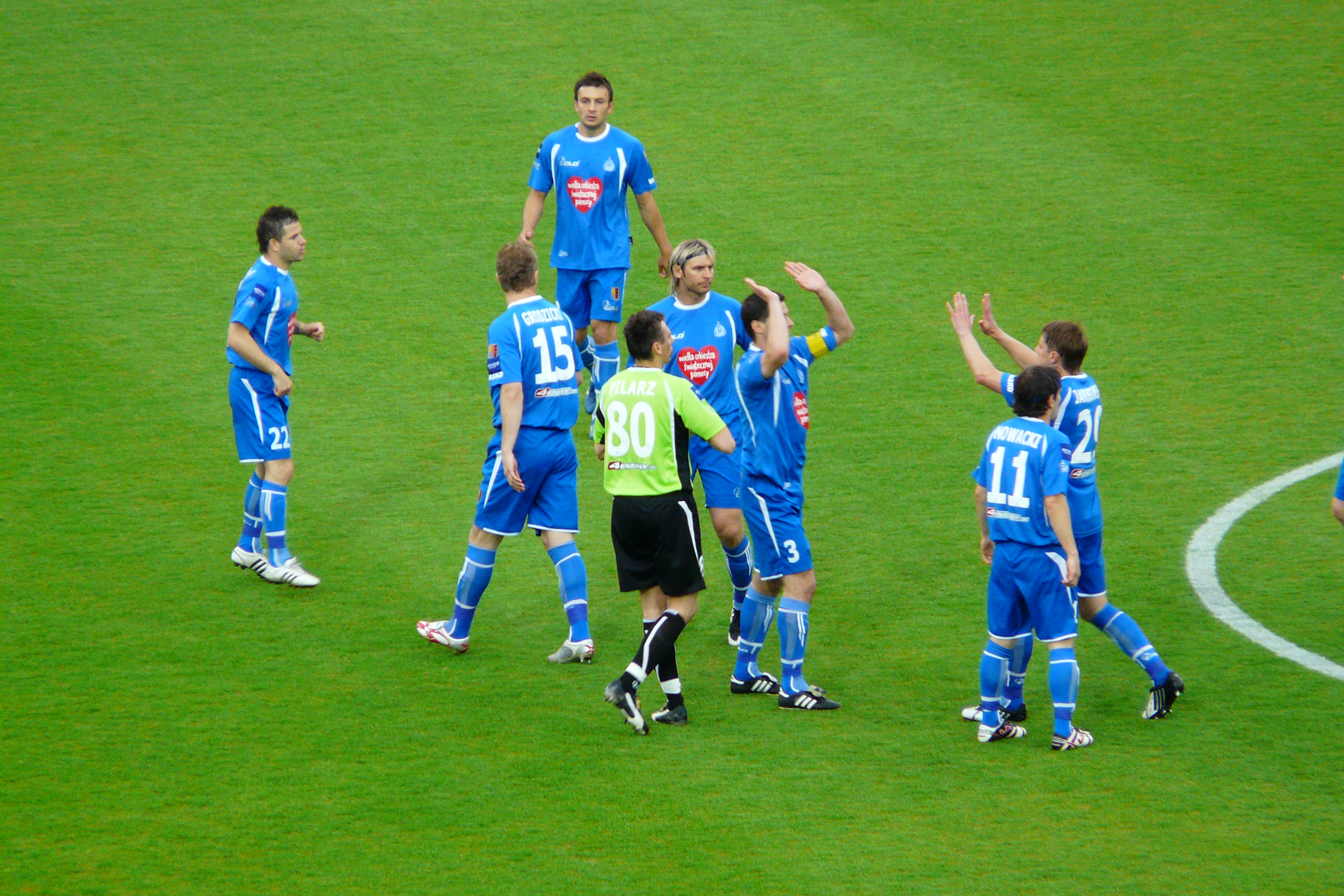
Ruch Chorzów players celebrating promotion to the 2008–09 Polish Cup final

After the political turnover in Poland in 1989, Ruch did not fare well for the first two seasons. The funds from the transfer of Krzysztof Warzycha to Panathinaikos ran out quickly. The team began to compete with the top teams first in 1991–92 finishing in the fifth spot, fourth the next year, furthermore the second team (Ruch II) reached the Polish cup final. Ruch was demoted for the second time in the history in the 1994–95 season. As before the stay in the second tier lasted one season. While playing in the second league Ruch won its third Polish Cup trophy. In 1998 Ruch reached the final of the UEFA Intertoto Cup and in the 1999–2000 season finished third in the league. The crisis came during the 2002–03 campaign, when the club was relegated from the top tier for the third time. In the following season, Ruch was in danger of being demoted to the third tier for the first time in history, however the club won the relegation play-offs against Stal Rzeszów (1–1, 2–0). In 2005, the club was restructured as a joint-stock company. The Blues won the promotion to the top flight in the 2006–07 season. In 2009, the side reached the Polish Cup final, the next year The Blues finished third in the league. The best season in the recent history was 2011–12, when Ruch was vice-champion (only 1 point behind the champions, Śląsk Wrocław) and reached the final of the national cup, which they lost 0–3 to Legia Warsaw.

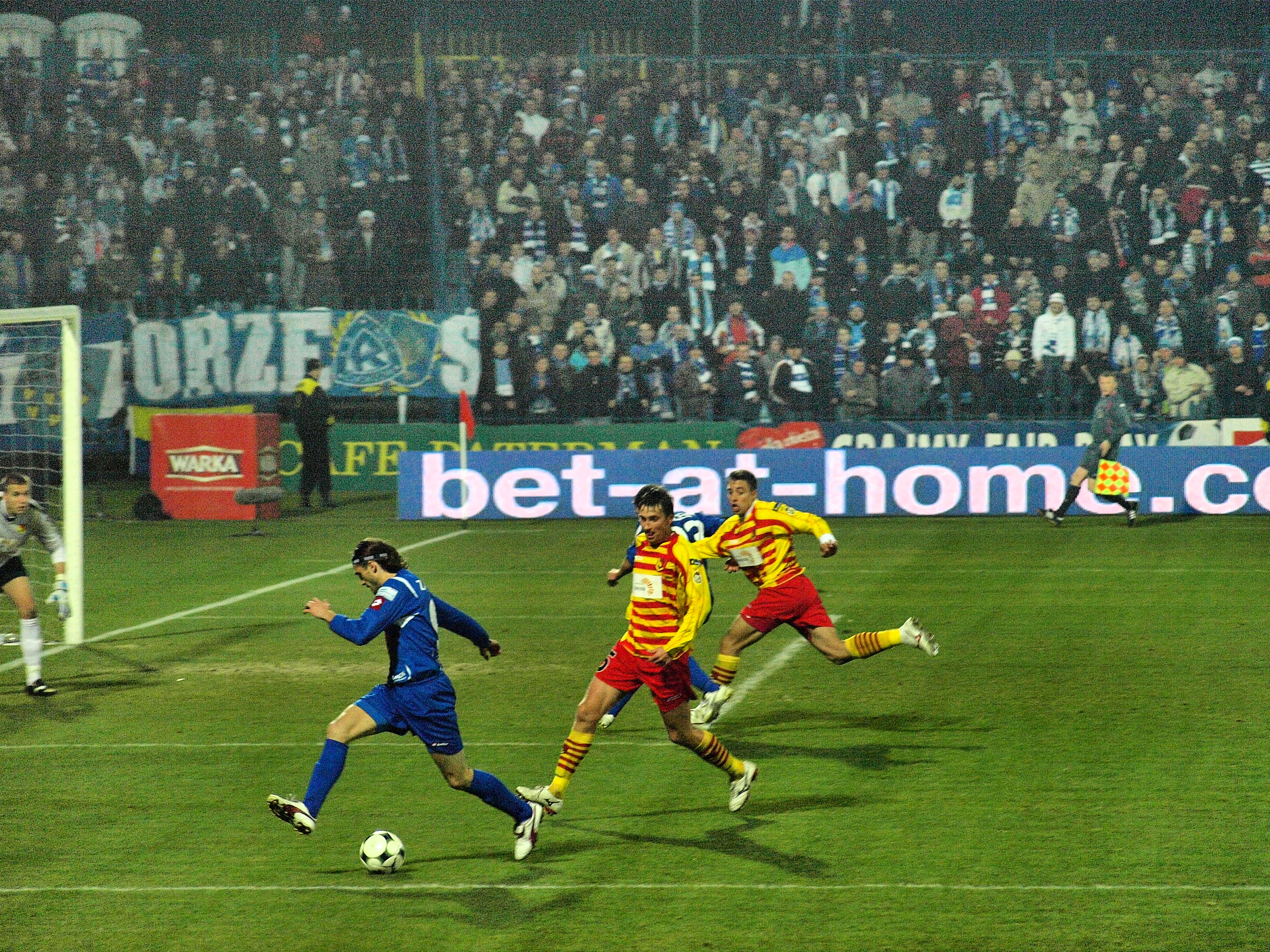
Home game with Jagiellonia Białystok in the 2009–10 Ekstraklasa

In 2017, it was decided that for the first time in the history of Polish football, in accordance with the Restructuring Law, SA will initiate an accelerated arrangement procedure aimed at agreeing the terms of debt repayment with creditors. These proceedings were opened before the Katowice District Court on 23 June 2017. In these proceedings all 255 creditors were offered to reduce the debt, spread it into installments or convert the debt into club shares. On 30 November 2017 creditors gathered in court to decide whether or not to accept the offer. The majority agreed and the agreement was adopted, ultimately the agreement became final on 13 March 2018. According to the provisions of the agreement, Ruch is to repay PLN 8 million złoty within 5 years. Installments are spread over 400 thousand złoty every quarter.

Ruch started the 2017–18 season in Nice I liga with a six-point deduction for unpaid debts. After a disastrous season in which the Blues suffered heavy defeats, including 0–6 in a home match against Pogoń Siedlce on the club's 98th anniversary, a 6–1 away defeat against Miedź Legnica and a 6–0 away loss to Wigry Suwałki, the club finished last in the league, being 11 points off the play-off place, which resulted in the first relegation to the third level in Ruch's history.

Ruch ended the 2018–19 season in the II liga in last place, eight points off of safety. It was the third season in a row in which the Blues were relegated from last place in the table.

In 2020–21, Ruch dominated group III of the III liga and were promoted to the II liga, 11 points ahead of second placed Polonia Bytom.

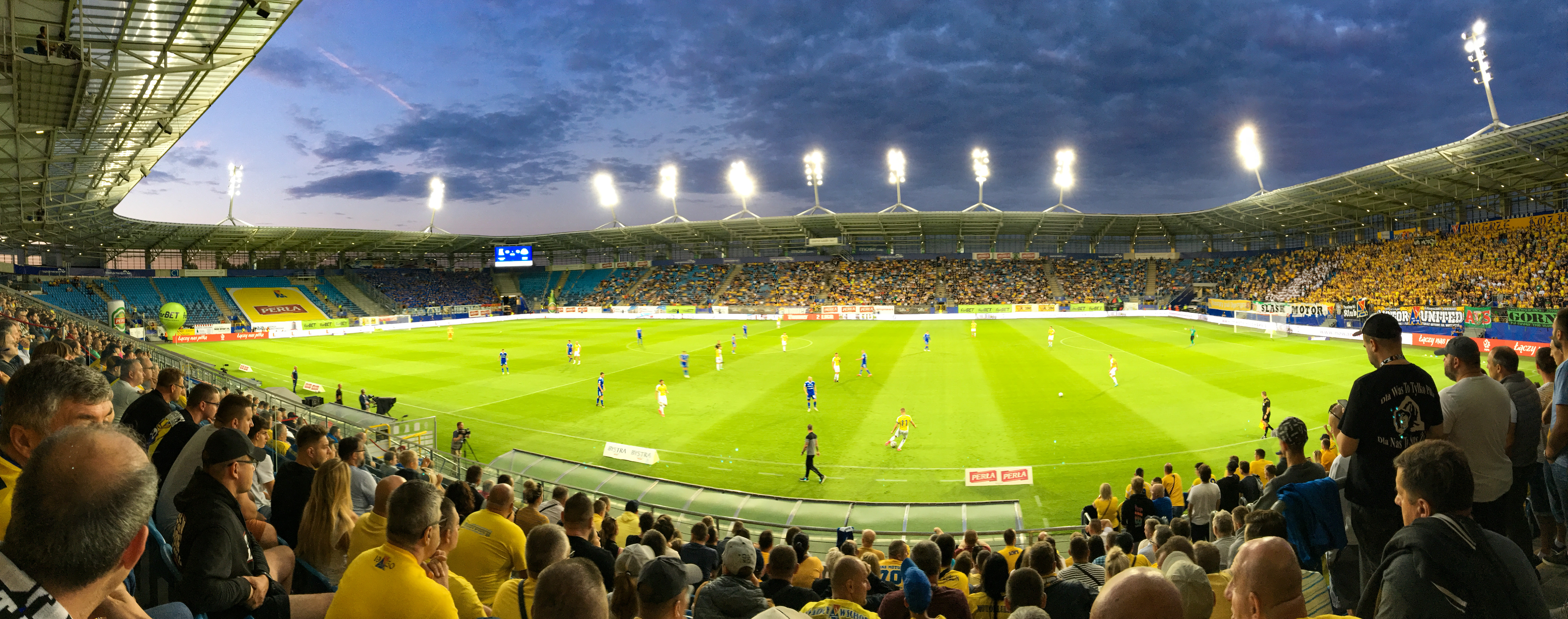
Away game with Motor Lublin in the 2021–22 II liga

Ruch finished the 2021–22 season in third place, qualifying for the promotion play-offs. In the semi-finals, the team faced Radunia Stężyca, which they beat 1–0 after a goal from Daniel Szczepan in the 118th minute. The final was played in Chorzów, where Ruch faced 5th placed Motor Lublin - on 29 May, Ruch won 4–0 and was promoted for the second season in a row, returning to the I liga for the first time since the 2017–18 season.

Ruch finished the 2022–23 season as runners-up, after defeating GKS Tychy 1–0 on the last matchday, with the sole goal scored again by Daniel Szczepan. In result, Ruch returned to Ekstraklasa after 7 years of absence, with a streak of three straight promotions.

However, Ruch were relegated back to the second division after just a single season back in the top flight, finishing the 2023–24 campaign in 17th and second-last.

== Honours ==
- Ekstraklasa
  - Champions: 1933, 1934, 1935, 1936, 1938, 1951, (Note: (In 1951, Wisła Kraków was the league champion, however, the championship title was awarded to the Cup winners, Ruch Chorzów.)) 1952, 1953, 1960, 1967–68, 1973–74, 1974–75, 1978–79, 1988–89
  - Runners-up: 1950, 1956, 1962–63, 1969–70, 1972–73, 2011–12
  - Third place: 1937, 1948, 1954, 1955, 1966–67, 1982–83, 1999–2000, 2009–10, 2013–14
- I liga
  - Champions: 1987–88, 2006–07
  - Runners-up: 2022–23
- II liga
  - Promotion play-off winner: 2021–22
- III liga
  - Champions: 2020–21 (group III)

=== Cup ===
- Polish Cup
  - Winners: 1950–51, 1973–74, 1995–96
  - Runners-up: 1962–63, 1967–68, 1969–70, 1992–93, 2008–09, 2011–12
- Polish Super Cup
  - Runners-up: 1989, 1996

=== Europe ===
- European Cup
  - Quarter-finals: 1974–75
- UEFA Cup
  - Quarter-finals: 1973–74
- UEFA Intertoto Cup
  - Finalists: 1998

=== Youth teams ===
- Polish U-19 Championship
  - Champions: 1965, 1984

== Players ==
=== Current squad ===
As of 14 September 2026

Note: Flags indicate national team as defined under FIFA eligibility rules; some limited exceptions apply. Players may hold more than one non-FIFA nationality.

No.	Pos.	Nation	Player
1	GK	POL	Marcel Potoczny
2	DF	POL	Krystian Wachowiak
3	DF	ESP	Abraham del Moral
4	DF	POL	Filip Kędziera
5	MF	POL	Mateusz Rosół
6	MF	POL	Michał Chrapek
7	MF	CZE	Jakub Křišťan
8	MF	POL	Patryk Sikora
9	FW	POL	Max Pawłowski
10	MF	ENG	Teddy Sutherland
11	FW	POL	Seweryn Cieślak
14	DF	POL	Filip Wójcik
15	DF	POL	Martin Konczkowski
17	DF	CRO	Andrej Lukić
18	MF	JPN	Shuma Nagamatsu

No.	Pos.	Nation	Player
19	DF	POL	Jakub Domagała
20	MF	POL	Szymon Szymański (captain)
21	MF	POL	Patryk Szwedzik
22	MF	POL	Kamil Lipiński
24	DF	POL	Aleksander Komor
25	MF	SVK	Denis Ventúra
26	DF	POL	Mateusz Bąk
27	MF	POL	Kacper Laskowski
28	DF	POL	Nikodem Leśniak-Paduch
44	GK	POL	Jakub Wrąbel
82	GK	POL	Jakub Bielecki
88	MF	POL	Krystian Rostek
95	FW	POL	Daniel Szczepan
99	FW	ARG	Agustín Coscia

=== Out on loan ===
Note: Flags indicate national team as defined under FIFA eligibility rules; some limited exceptions apply. Players may hold more than one non-FIFA nationality.

No.	Pos.	Nation	Player
29	MF	POL	Filip Lachendro (at Chrobry Głogów until 30 June 2027)
30	MF	POL	Jakub Sobeczko (at Chojniczanka Chojnice until 30 June 2027)

No.	Pos.	Nation	Player
70	GK	POL	Nikodem Proczek (at Pogoń-Sokół Lubaczów until 30 June 2027)

=== Notable former players ===
- (Poland) Ernst Wilimowski
- (Poland) Teodor Peterek
- (Poland) Gerard Wodarz
- (Poland) Gerard Cieślik
- (Poland) Zygmunt Maszczyk
- (Poland) Krzysztof Warzycha
- (Poland) Waldemar Fornalik
- (Poland) Dariusz Gęsior
- (Poland) Roman Dąbrowski
- (Poland) Krzysztof Bizacki
- (Poland) Michał Probierz
- (Poland) Mariusz Śrutwa
- (Poland) Piotr Lech
- (Poland) Artur Sobiech
- (Poland) Tomasz Brzyski
- (Poland) Jarosław Paśnik
- (Poland) Grzegorz Kuświk
- (Poland) Martin Konczkowski
- (Poland) Łukasz Surma
- (Poland) Tomasz Jaworek
- (Lithuania) Gražvydas Mikulėnas
- (Slovakia) Michal Peškovič
- (Latvia) Eduards Višņakovs

== Managerial history ==
As of 7 August 2025

Name	From	To
(Austria) Gustav Wieser	Oct 1934	July 1935
(Austria) Günther Ringer	Aug 1936	Nov 1937
(Hungary) Ferenc Fogl	June 1938	Jan 1939
(Hungary) Péter Szabó	Jan 1939	July 1939
(Czechoslovakia) František Dembický	Jan 1948	Dec 1948
(Poland) Gerard Wodarz	July 1949	Dec 1949
(Poland) Ryszard Koncewicz	Jan 1950	June 1952
(Poland) Ewald Cebula	July 1952	June 1954
(Poland) Adam Niemiec	July 1954	Dec 1956
(Poland) Mikołaj Beljung	Feb 1957	Oct 1957
(Poland) Czesław Suszczyk	Oct 1957	Dec 1957
(Hungary) Janos Steiner	Jan 1958	Dec 1958
(Poland) Ewald Cebula	Jan 1959	Dec 1959
(Hungary) Janos Steiner	Jan 1960	May 1960
(Poland) Ewald Cebula	May 1960	June 1960
(Hungary) Lajos Szolár	June 1960	Dec 1960
(Poland) Gerard Wodarz	Jan 1961	April 1961
(Poland) Gerard Cieślik	April 1961	July 1961
(Hungary) Sándor Tátrai	July 1961	Oct 1963
(Poland) Franciszek Tim	Oct 1963	Nov 1963
(Poland) Augustyn Dziwisz	Dec 1963	Sept 1964
(Poland) Artur Woźniak	Sept 1964	June 1966
(Poland) Teodor Wieczorek	July 1966	April 1969
(Poland) Eugeniusz Pohl (Poland) Hubert Pala	May 1969	June 1969
(Poland) Jerzy Nikiel	July 1969	Nov 1969

Name	From	To
(Poland) Tadeusz Foryś	Dec 1969	June 1971
(Poland) Hubert Pala	June 1971	June 1971
(Czechoslovakia) Michal Vičan	July 1971	April 1976
(Poland) Rudolf Kapera	April 1976	June 1976
(Czechoslovakia) Frantisek Havranek	July 1976	Oct 1977
(Poland) Teodor Wieczorek	Oct 1977	June 1978
(Poland) Leszek Jezierski	June 1978	Nov 1980
(Poland) Antoni Piechniczek	Nov 1980	Jan 1981
(Poland) Józef Zwierzyna	Jan 1981	Sept 1981
(Poland) Piotr Czaja	Sept 1981	May 1982
(Poland) Orest Lenczyk	1 July 1982	1 Feb 1984
(Poland) Alojzy Łysko	Feb 1984	Dec 1984
(Poland) Władysław Jan Żmuda	1 Jan 1985	1 May 1987
(Poland) Jacek Góralczyk	April 1987	May 1987
(Poland) Jacek Machciński	May 1987	July 1987
(Poland) Jerzy Wyrobek	1 July 1987	1 July 1990
(Poland) Zdzisław Podedworny	July 1990	March 1991
(Poland) Edward Lorens	1 April 1991	1 May 1994
(Poland) Albin Wira	3 May 1994	4 May 1995
(Poland) Jerzy Wyrobek	5 May 1995	23 Sept 1996
(Poland) Orest Lenczyk	24 Sept 1996	23 March 1999
(Poland) Edward Lorens	23 March 1999	30 June 2000
(Poland) Jan Żurek	1 July 2000	21 Aug 2000
(Poland) Jan Rudnow	Aug 2000	Dec 2000
(Poland) Bogusław Pietrzak	1 Dec 2000	11 April 2002
(Poland) Orest Lenczyk	11 April 2002	9 Oct 2002

Name	From	To
(Poland) Piotr Mandrysz	10 Oct 2002	30 June 2003
(Poland) Jerzy Wyrobek	1 July 2003	5 May 2005
(Poland) Dariusz Fornalak	5 May 2005	22 Nov 2005
(Poland) Edward Lorens	22 Nov 2005	27 Nov 2005
(Poland) Marek Wleciałowski	28 Nov 2005	15 June 2007
(Slovakia) Dušan Radolský	15 June 2007	10 Sept 2008
(Poland) Bogusław Pietrzak	10 Sept 2008	27 April 2009
(Poland) Waldemar Fornalik	27 April 2009	10 July 2012
(Poland) Tomasz Fornalik	12 July 2012	5 Sept 2012
(Poland) Jacek Zieliński	5 Sept 2012	16 Sept 2013
(Poland) Dariusz Fornalak (caretaker)	16 Sept 2013	18 Sept 2013
(Slovakia) Ján Kocian	18 Sept 2013	6 Oct 2014
(Poland) Waldemar Fornalik	7 Oct 2014	22 Apr 2017
(Poland) Krzysztof Warzycha	24 Apr 2017	10 Sep 2017
(Argentina) Juan Ramón Rocha	10 Sep 2017	5 Apr 2018
(Poland) Dariusz Fornalak	5 Apr 2018	1 Nov 2018
(Poland) Marek Wleciałowski	1 Nov 2018	18 Apr 2019
(Poland) Karol Michalski	18 Apr 2019	18 Jun 2019
(Poland) Łukasz Bereta	18 Jun 2019	23 Jun 2021
(Poland) Jarosław Skrobacz	24 Jun 2021	6 Nov 2023
(Poland) Jan Woś	6 Nov 2023	29 Dec 2023
(Poland) Janusz Niedźwiedź	29 Dec 2023	24 Aug 2024
(Poland) Karol Szweda (caretaker)	24 Aug 2024	27 Aug 2024
(Poland) Dawid Szulczek	27 Aug 2024	5 Aug 2025
(Poland) Waldemar Fornalik	6 Aug 2025	Present

== Ruch in Europe ==
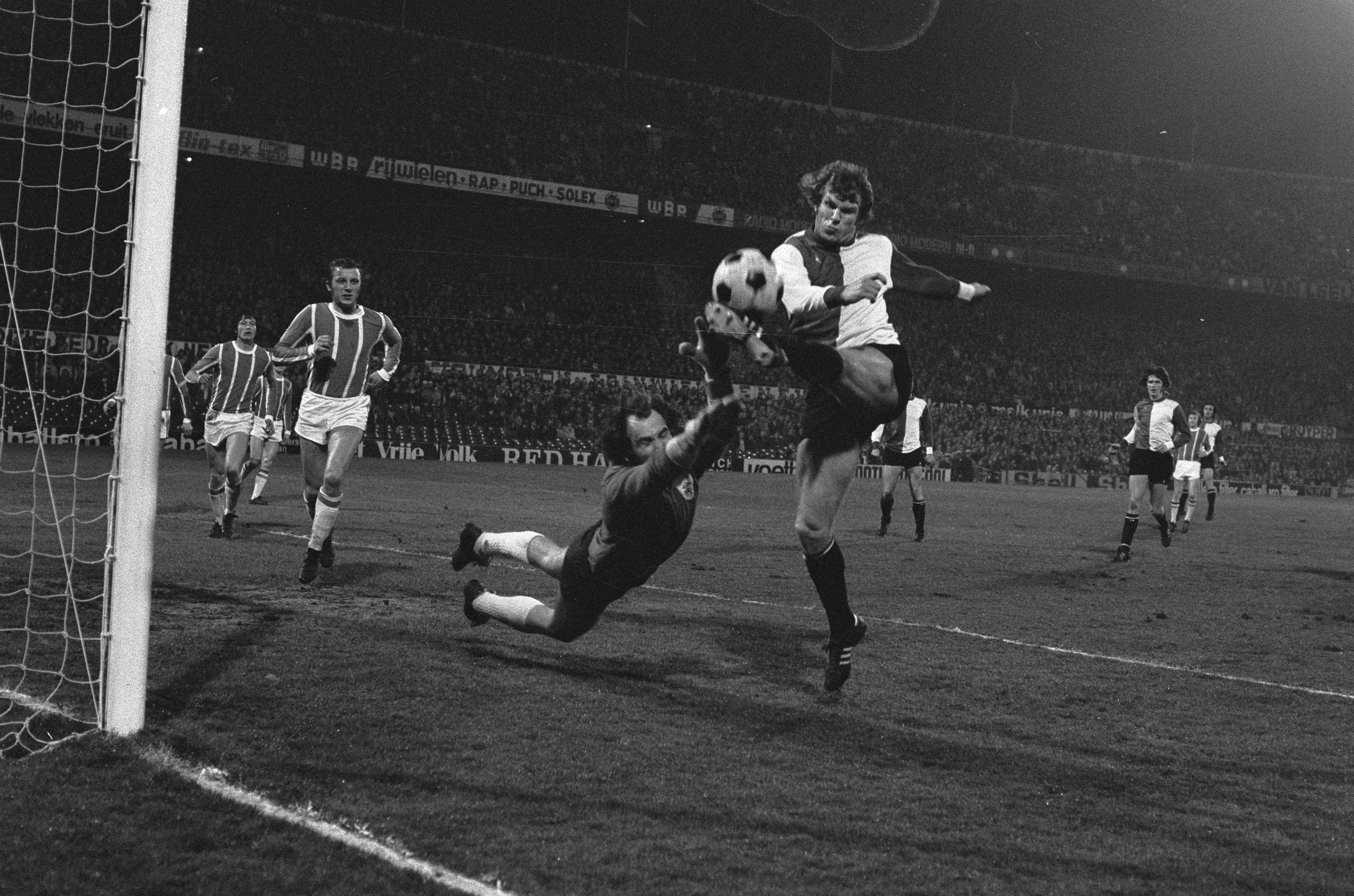
Away game with Feyenoord in the quarter-finals of the 1973–74 UEFA Cup

Season	Competition	Round		Club	Score
1972–73	UEFA Cup	1R	(Turkey)	Fenerbahçe	3–0, 0–1
1972–73	UEFA Cup	2R	(East Germany)	Dynamo Dresden	0–1, 0–3
1973–74	UEFA Cup	1R	(Germany)	Wuppertaler SV	4–1, 4–5
1973–74	UEFA Cup	2R	(East Germany)	Carl Zeiss Jena	3–0, 0–1
1973–74	UEFA Cup	3R	(Hungary)	Budapest Honvéd	0–2, 5–0
1973–74	UEFA Cup	QF	(Netherlands)	Feyenoord	1–1, 1–3
1974–75	European Cup	1R	(Denmark)	Hvidovre IF	0–0, 2–1
1974–75	European Cup	2R	(Turkey)	Fenerbahçe	2–1, 2–0
1974–75	European Cup	QF	(France)	Saint-Étienne	3–2, 0–2
1975–76	European Cup	1R	(Finland)	KuPS	5–0, 2–2
1975–76	European Cup	2R	(Netherlands)	PSV Eindhoven	1–3, 0–4
1979–80	European Cup	1R	(East Germany)	Dynamo Berlin	1–4, 0–0
1989–90	European Cup	1R	(Bulgaria)	CSKA Sofia	1–1, 1–5
1996–97	UEFA Cup Winners' Cup	Q	(Wales)	Llansantffraid	1–1, 5–0
1996–97	UEFA Cup Winners' Cup	1R	(Portugal)	Benfica	1–5, 0–0
1998	Intertoto Cup	1R	(Austria)	Austria Wien	1–0, 2–2
1998	Intertoto Cup	2R	(Sweden)	Örgryte	1–2, 1–0
1998	Intertoto Cup	3R	(Portugal)	Estrela da Amadora	1–1, 1–1
1998	Intertoto Cup	4R	(Hungary)	Debrecen	1–0, 3–0
1998	Intertoto Cup	5R	(Italy)	Bologna	0–1, 0–2
2000–01	UEFA Cup	Q	(Lithuania)	Žalgiris Vilnius	1–2, 6–0
2000–01	UEFA Cup	1R	(Italy)	Inter Milan	0–3, 1–4
2010–11	UEFA Europa League	1Q	(Kazakhstan)	Shakhter Karagandy	2–1, 1–0
2010–11	UEFA Europa League	2Q	(Malta)	Valletta	1–1, 0–0
2010–11	UEFA Europa League	3Q	(Austria)	Austria Wien	1–3, 0–3
2012–13	UEFA Europa League	2Q	(North Macedonia)	Metalurg Skopje	3–1, 3–0
2012–13	UEFA Europa League	3Q	(Czech Republic)	Viktoria Plzeň	0–2, 0–5
2014–15	UEFA Europa League	2Q	(Liechtenstein)	FC Vaduz	3–2, 0–0
2014–15	UEFA Europa League	3Q	(Denmark)	Esbjerg	0–0, 2–2
2014–15	UEFA Europa League	PO	(Ukraine)	Metalist Kharkiv	0–0, 0–1 (a.e.t)

== Crest ==
Ruch Chorzów has a very specific crest and is one of the most recognizable football crests in Poland. There isn't information who was the author of the prototype and in which year the crest was used for the first time. The oldest confirmed source is letterhead from 1929. The club colours are blue and white. They accompany the team from the very beginning of the club's existence and already in the twenties it was written about Ruch - "Niebiescy" (en. The Blues). This color has become the symbol of the club. Except for the emblem of Unia Chorzów (around 1949–1955), the shield of the crest has always been, more or less precisely, the blue Reuleaux triangle with the club's full name on the rim. The white center of the sign is filled with an acronym. In the late 1980s, the monogram was decorated with thin lines, emphasizing the activity, militancy and mobility of the signet itself, and thereby reflecting the name of the club in a slightly expressive way (Ruch means Movement in English). In September 2007, it was decided to make a facelift of the logo, which was to be a sign of the continuous evolution of the brand of Ruch Chorzów. Shading was introduced to the sign in order to plasticize the drawing, give depth and spaciousness to the whole crest. In this way, they tried to show the spirit of nowadays and to gain the identity of a modern and attractive brand. However, trends for gradients quickly passed, while the crest in this version stayed for a long time and received many opponents. In 2021, after the jubilee year, starting its second century, the club decided to return to the most acceptable version of the crest among fans.

THE CRESTS OF RUCH CHORZÓW

→ 1939

~1945–1947

~1948–1949

~1949–1955

~1955

~1956–1959

~1960

~1960–1969

~1970–1979

~1980–1989

~1989–1999

~2000–2007

~2007–2020

2021 →

_{Due to the lack of a consistent chronology of individual marks, the above listing of all crests with dates is approximate and conventional. The set above does not include jubilee signs.}

== Upper Silesian symbolism ==
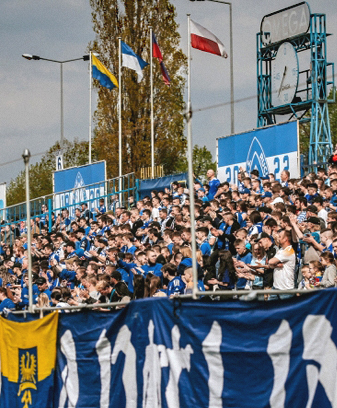
Masts with flags at the Ruch Chorzów Stadium

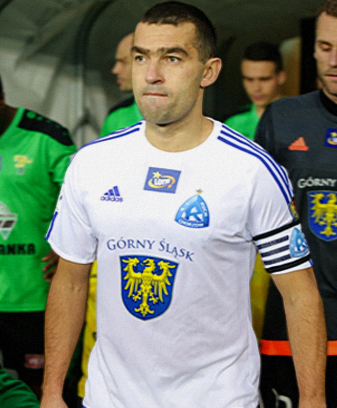
Łukasz Surma (19.11.2016 Górnik Łęczna - Ruch Chorzów)

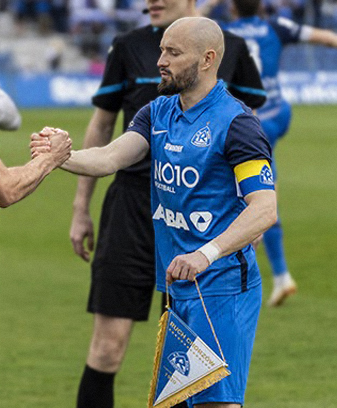
Tomasz Foszmańczyk (01.05.2022 Ruch Chorzów - Znicz Pruszków)

Ruch Chorzów proudly emphasizes its Upper Silesian origin. The club is considered to be "synonymous with Silesianess" and has been called "the most Silesian of Silesian clubs". On the stadium mast hangs the Upper Silesian flag, the stadium announcer often declares Tooor! (en. Goal!) over the tannoy after goals scored, while the club mascot is named Adler, an anthropomorphic eagle, stylized as a golden eagle from the Upper Silesian coat of arms, who speaks only in the Silesian language. In fan stores there are many products with Upper Silesian symbols, on social media the club tags all posts with the hashtag #MySomRuch (en. We are Ruch), and on the club's television channel people often uses the Silesian language. An example of which may be the video promoting the match against Zagłębie Sosnowiec.

The symbolism of Upper Silesia is also often displayed from a sporting angle. On July 15, 2015, on Silesian Flag Day, the club presented new away kits for the 2015/2016 season. The yellow jersey, blue shorts and yellow socks alluded to the flag of Upper Silesia, intended to emphasize the Silesian character of Ruch, in whose traditions the club is so deeply rooted. The debut of the kits took place on the 80th anniversary of the stadium, and the team played in such a set for the first time in history. On that day, the coat of arms of the Silesian Voivodeship was additionally on the sleeve, and the announcer during the match spoke entirely in the Silesian language.

In the 2016–17 season, the team's jerseys had a large coat of arms of Upper Silesia with the inscription "Upper Silesia". Initially, only the first match was played in such kits, and all of them went to a charity auction, but after many requests from fans and the approval of the winners of these auctions, the emblem was printed on kits once again and from the 13th round they were in use until the end of the season.

On 23 April 2022, in a match against Radunia Stężyca, Ruch's captain Tomasz Foszmańczyk put on a captain's armband with the Upper Silesian flag for the first time in the club's history.

== Supporters and rivalries ==
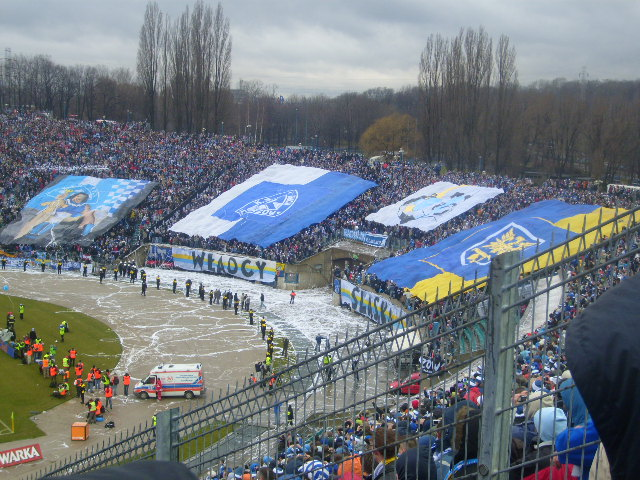
Derby against Górnik Zabrze (2008)

Ruch's popularity exploded in the 1930s and has remained strong ever since, especially in Upper Silesia. A specific subculture of szalikowcy (a name derived from szalik - scarf) developed in the 1970s, as elsewhere in the country, but regionally only after having first appeared among fans of Polonia Bytom. There are also hooligans (Psycho Fans, formed in the mid-1990s) and ultras (Nucleo Ultra '03 from 2003, replaced by Ultras Niebiescy, formed in 2008).

Expressions of Upper Silesian identity are often displayed in the form of golden-blue flags, on banners, such as the controversial Oberschlesien example, now banned, or To my Naród Śląski (transl. It's us - Silesian Nation), or through chants.

Ruch's supporters maintain friendships with fans of Widzew Łódź (since 2005), Elana Toruń, and Atlético Madrid. The biggest animosity is held against the followers of Górnik Zabrze (with whom The Great Silesian Derby is contested), GKS Katowice, Polonia Bytom (the oldest Silesian derby), Zagłębie Sosnowiec, Legia Warszawa, and Lech Poznań.

Notable individual supporters of Ruch are, among others:

- Jerzy Bralczyk – professor at Warsaw University
- Jerzy Buzek – professor of technical science and politician who was the ninth post-Cold War Prime Minister of Poland from 1997 to 2001
- Gustaw Holoubek – actor, director, member of the Polish Sejm, and a senator.
- Bogdan Kalus – actor
- Wojciech Kilar – classical and film music composer
- Wojciech Kuczok – novelist, poet, and screenwriter
- Kazimierz Kutz – film director, author, journalist and politician
- Jan Miodek – linguist, professor of Wrocław University
- Jerzy Szymik – poet, professor of KUL
- Ingmar Villqist (Jarosław Świerszcz) – writer
- Karol Gwóźdź – poet, musician, graphic designer
- Szczepan Twardoch – writer
- Michał Żurawski – film and theater actor
