= 2015–16 Lech Poznań season =

Lech Poznań
2015–16 season
- Chairman: Karol Klimczak
- Manager: Jan Urban (From 12 October 2015); Maciej Skorża (Until 12 October 2015)
- Stadium: INEA Stadion
- Ekstraklasa: 7th
- Polish Cup: Runners-up
- Polish Super Cup: Winners
- UEFA Champions League: Third qualifying round
- UEFA Europa League: Group Stage
- Top goalscorer: League: Kasper Hämäläinen (8); All: Kasper Hämäläinen (9)
- Highest home attendance: Ekstraklasa: 41,567 vs. Legia (19 March 2016); Polish Cup: 12,885 vs. Zagłębie Sosnowiec (15 March 2016); Polish Super Cup: 40,088 vs. Legia (10 July 2015); Europe: 25,478 vs. Basel (29 July 2015)
- Lowest home attendance: Ekstraklasa: 10,289 vs. Piast (19 April 2016); Polish Cup: 9,271 vs. Zagłębie Lubin (19 November 2015); Europe: 7,934 vs. Belenenses (17 September 2015)
- Average home league attendance: 16,761
Home colours	Away colours

Lech Poznań is a Polish football club based in Poznań. This was their 93rd season overall. They competed in Ekstraklasa, the highest ranking league in Poland.

== Squad ==
As of 15 May 2016.

Note: Flags indicate national team as defined under FIFA eligibility rules; some limited exceptions apply. Players may hold more than one non-FIFA nationality.

No.	Pos.	Nation	Player
1	GK	BIH	Jasmin Burić
2	DF	POL	Robert Gumny
3	DF	MNE	Vladimir Volkov (on loan from KV Mechelen)
4	DF	POL	Tomasz Kędziora
5	DF	HUN	Tamás Kádár
6	MF	POL	Łukasz Trałka (captain)
7	MF	POL	Karol Linetty
8	MF	POL	Szymon Pawłowski
10	MF	SUI	Darko Jevtić
11	FW	HUN	Gergő Lovrencsics
14	MF	POL	Maciej Gajos
15	DF	POL	Dariusz Dudka
19	FW	DEN	Nicki Bille Nielsen
21	DF	GAM	Kebba Ceesay
22	FW	POL	Marcin Robak

No.	Pos.	Nation	Player
23	DF	FIN	Paulus Arajuuri
24	FW	POL	Dawid Kownacki
25	MF	ESP	Sisi
26	DF	POL	Maciej Wilusz
27	GK	POL	Krzysztof Kotorowski
29	MF	POL	Kamil Jóźwiak
30	GK	POL	Adam Makuchowski
31	MF	POL	Krystian Sanocki
34	FW	POL	Piotr Kurbiel
35	DF	POL	Marcin Kamiński
36	GK	POL	Mateusz Lis
37	MF	GER	Niklas Zulciak
39	DF	POL	Tomasz Dejewski
55	MF	GHA	Abdul Aziz Tetteh

=== Out on loan ===
Note: Flags indicate national team as defined under FIFA eligibility rules; some limited exceptions apply. Players may hold more than one non-FIFA nationality.

No.	Pos.	Nation	Player
16	MF	POL	Jakub Serafin (At Bytovia Bytów)
17	MF	POL	Szymon Drewniak (At Chrobry Głogów)
18	FW	GER	Denis Thomalla (At 1. FC Heidenheim)

No.	Pos.	Nation	Player
28	MF	POL	Dariusz Formella (At Arka Gdynia)
40	DF	POL	Jan Bednarek (At Górnik Łęczna)
77	FW	NOR	Muhamed Keita (At Strømsgodset)

== Transfer ==
=== Summer transfer window ===
==== In ====
No.	Pos.	Nat.	Name	Age	EU	Moving from	Type	Transfer window	Ends	Transfer fee	Source
15	DF	(Poland)	Dariusz Dudka	31	EU	Wisła Kraków	Transfer	Summer	2018	Free	
14	MF	(Poland)	Maciej Gajos	24	EU	Jagiellonia Białystok	Transfer	Summer	2019	€500,000	
34	FW	(Poland)	Piotr Kurbiel	19	EU		Transfer	Summer	Undisclosed	Youth system	
22	FW	(Poland)	Marcin Robak	32	EU	Pogoń Szczecin	Transfer	Summer	2017	€100,000	
55	MF	(Ghana)	Abdul Aziz Tetteh	25	Non-EU	(Greece) Platanias	Transfer	Summer	2018	€300,000	
18	FW	(Germany)	Denis Thomalla	22	EU	(Germany) RB Leipzig	Transfer	Summer	2018	€400,000	

Total spending: ▼€1,300,000

==== Out ====
No.	Pos.	Nat.	Name	Age	EU	Moving to	Type	Transfer window	Transfer fee	Source
40	DF	(Poland)	Jan Bednarek	19	EU	Górnik Łęczna	Loan	Summer	Free	
88	MF	(Belgium) (Cameroon)	Arnaud Djoum	26	EU	(Scotland) Heart of Midlothian	End of contract	Summer	Free	
17	MF	(Poland)	Szymon Drewniak	22	EU	Chrobry Głogów	Loan	Summer	Free	
25	DF	(Panama)	Luis Henríquez	33	Non-EU	(Panama) Tauro	End of contract	Summer	Free	
77	MF	(Norway) (The Gambia)	Muhamed Keita	24	Non-EU	(Norway) Stabæk	Loan	Summer	Free	
36	GK	(Poland)	Mateusz Lis	18	EU	Miedź Legnica	Loan	Summer	Free	
95	FW	(Russia)	Zaur Sadayev	25	Non-EU	(Russia) Terek Grozny	End of loan	Summer	Free	
16	MF	(Poland)	Jakub Serafin	19	EU	GKS Bełchatów	Loan	Summer	Free	
14	FW	(Serbia)	Vojo Ubiparip	27	Non-EU	(Hungary) Vasas	End of contract	Summer	Free	
26	DF	(Poland)	Maciej Wilusz	27	EU	Korona Kielce	Loan	Summer	Free	

Total income: €0

Total expenditure: ▼€1,300,000

=== Winter transfer window ===
==== In ====
No.	Pos.	Nat.	Name	Age	EU	Moving from	Type	Transfer window	Ends	Transfer fee	Source
39	DF	(Poland)	Tomasz Dejewski	20	EU		Transfer	Winter	Undisclosed	Youth system	
2	DF	(Poland)	Robert Gumny	17	EU		Transfer	Winter	2019	Youth system	
29	MF	(Poland)	Kamil Jóźwiak	17	EU		Transfer	Winter	2019	Youth system	
77	MF	(Norway) (The Gambia)	Muhamed Keita	25	Non-EU	(Norway) Stabæk	Return from loan	Winter	2017	Free	
36	GK	(Poland)	Mateusz Lis	18	EU	Miedź Legnica	Return from loan	Winter	2016	Free	
30	GK	(Poland)	Adam Makuchowski	19	EU		Transfer	Winter	Undisclosed	Youth system	
19	FW	(Denmark)	Nicki Bille Nielsen	27	EU	(Denmark) Esbjerg	Transfer	Winter	2018	€600,000	
16	MF	(Poland)	Jakub Serafin	19	EU	GKS Bełchatów	Return from loan	Winter	Undisclosed	Free	
25	MF	(Spain)	Sisi	29	EU	(South Korea) Suwon FC	Transfer	Winter	2016	Free	
3	DF	(Montenegro) (Serbia)	Vladimir Volkov	29	Non-EU	(Belgium) KV Mechelen	Loan	Winter	2016	Free	
26	DF	(Poland)	Maciej Wilusz	27	EU	Korona Kielce	Return from loan	Winter	2016	Free	

Total spending: ▼€600,000

==== Out ====
No.	Pos.	Nat.	Name	Age	EU	Moving to	Type	Transfer window	Transfer fee	Source
3	DF	(Scotland)	Barry Douglas	26	EU	(Turkey) Konyaspor	Transfer	Winter	€300,000	
28	MF	(Poland)	Dariusz Formella	20	EU	Arka Gdynia	Loan	Winter	Free	
33	GK	(Poland)	Maciej Gostomski	27	EU	(Scotland) Rangers	End of contract	Winter	Free	
19	MF	(Finland)	Kasper Hämäläinen	29	EU	Legia Warsaw	End of contract	Winter	Free	
20	MF	(Hungary)	Dávid Holman	22	EU	(Hungary) Ferencváros	End of loan	Winter	Free	
77	MF	(Norway) (The Gambia)	Muhamed Keita	25	Non-EU	(Norway) Strømsgodset	Loan	Winter	Free	
16	MF	(Poland)	Jakub Serafin	19	EU	Bytovia Bytów	Loan	Winter	Free	
18	FW	(Germany)	Denis Thomalla	23	EU	(Germany) 1. FC Heidenheim	Loan	Winter	Free	

Total income: ▲€300,000

Total expenditure: ▼€300,000

== Friendlies ==
Win Draw Loss

28 June 2015 Club Friendly	Lech Poznań	2 – 0	(Lithuania) Atlantas	Gniewino, Poland
11:30 CEST (UTC+02:00)	Holman 14'; Kamiński 29'			Stadium: Stadion Gminny

1 July 2015 Club Friendly	Olimpia Grudziądz	1 – 2	Lech Poznań	Gniewino, Poland
17:00 CEST (UTC+02:00)	Piter-Bučko 29'		Kownacki 44', 58'	Stadium: Stadion Gminny

3 July 2015 Club Friendly	Lech Poznań	0 – 0	(Cyprus) APOEL	Gniewino, Poland
18:00 CEST (UTC+02:00)				Stadium: Stadion Gminny

4 July 2015 Club Friendly	Lech Poznań	3 – 0	(Cyprus) APOEL	Gniewino, Poland
19:00 CEST (UTC+02:00)	Kamiński 33'; Thomalla 56'; Kownacki 76'			Stadium: Stadion Gminny

11 July 2015 Club Friendly	Lech Poznań	3 – 0	Stomil Olsztyn	Poznań, Poland
13:00 CEST (UTC+02:00)	Holman 9'; Jevtić 19'; Zulciak 65'

19 January 2016 Club Friendly	Ufa (Russia)	1 – 1	Lech Poznań	Ayia Napa, Cyprus
11:00 CET (UTC+01:00)	Handžić 68'	Report	Kownacki 26' (pen.)	Stadium: Dimotikó Stádio Agías Nápas

23 January 2016 Club Friendly	Lech Poznań	3 – 1	Wigry Suwałki	Poznań, Poland
12:00 CET (UTC+01:00)	Formella 6'; Gajos 52'; Kędziora 67' (pen.)	Report	Atanacković 61'	Referee: Szymon Lizak (Poznań)

27 January 2016 Club Friendly	Lech Poznań	0 – 2	(Ukraine) Dynamo Kyiv	Marbella, Spain
16:00 CET (UTC+01:00)		Report	Moraes 53'; Myakushko 90'	Stadium: Estadio Municipal de Marbella

30 January 2016 Club Friendly	Lech Poznań	1 – 1	(China) Jiangsu Suning	Marbella, Spain
16:30 CET (UTC+01:00)	Jevtić 38'	Report	Xinlin 88'	Stadium: Marbella Football Center

1 February 2016 Club Friendly	Lech Poznań	1 – 3	(Czech Republic) Slavia Prague	Marbella, Spain
16:30 CET (UTC+01:00)	Kownacki 49'	Report	Škoda 3'; Hušbauer 40'; Kenia 69'	Stadium: Estadio Municipal de Marbella

4 February 2016 Club Friendly	Lech Poznań	1 – 1	(Russia) Krasnodar	Marbella, Spain
16:30 CET (UTC+01:00)	Jevtić 21'	Report	Ari 41'	Stadium: Marbella Football Center

9 February 2016 Club Friendly	Lech Poznań	3 – 0	Chrobry Głogów	Poznań, Poland
12:00 CET (UTC+01:00)	Kownacki; Jevtić; Pawłowski	Report		Attendance: 0

== Competitions ==
Win Draw Loss

=== Overall ===
Competition	Started round	Current position / round	Final position / round	First match	Last match
2015–16 Ekstraklasa	—	—	7th	18 July 2015	15 May 2016
2015–16 Polish Cup	Round of 32	—	Runners-up	11 August 2015	2 May 2016
2015 Polish Super Cup	Final	—	Winners	10 July 2015	
UEFA Champions League	Second qualifying round	—	Third qualifying round	14 July 2015	5 August 2015
UEFA Europa League	Play-off round	—	Group stage	20 August 2015	10 December 2015

Source: Competitions

=== Overview ===
Competition	Record							
Competition	G	W	D	L	GF	GA	GD	Win %
Ekstraklasa	37	14	6	17	42	47	−5	37.84
Polish Cup	7	5	1	1	7	2	+5	71.43
Polish Super Cup	1	1	0	0	3	1	+2	100.00
UEFA Champions League	4	2	0	2	4	4	+0	50.00
UEFA Europa League	8	3	2	3	6	6	+0	37.50
Total	57	25	9	23	62	60	+2	43.86

Source: Competitions

=== Ekstraklasa ===
==== Regular season ====
===== League table =====
Pos	Team	Pld	W	D	L	GF	GA	GD	Pts	Qualification
4	Zagłębie Lubin	30	12	9	9	41	37	+4	45 (Note: Head-to-head record: Zagłębie - Cracovia 4–2, Cracovia - Zagłębie 1–2.)	Qualification for the championship round
5	Cracovia	30	12	9	9	57	42	+15	45	Qualification for the championship round
6	Lech Poznań	30	13	4	13	37	38	−1	43	Qualification for the championship round
7	Lechia Gdańsk (Note: Lechia Gdańsk were punished with a deduction of one point for failing with licensing requirements. On 8 April 2016 the punishment was suspended by Polish Court of Arbitration for Sport. On April 11 an appeal against the original decision was withdrawn by the club.)	30	10	9	11	45	37	+8	38 (Note: Head-to-head record: Lechia 7 points, Ruch 5 points, Podbeskidzie 3 points.)	Qualification for the championship round
8	Ruch Chorzów (Note: Ruch Chorzów were punished with a deduction of one point for failing with licensing requirements.)	30	11	6	13	37	46	−9	38	Qualification for the championship round

Source: Ekstraklasa, Soccerway
Rules for classification: 1) Points; 2) Head-to-head points; 3) Head-to-head goal difference; 4) Head-to-head goals scored; 5) Head-to-head away goals scored (only if two teams); 6) Goal difference; 7) Goals scored; 8) Fairplay ranking; 9) Draw. (Note: Head-to-head record is used only after all the matches between the teams in question have been played).

===== Results summary =====
Overall								Home						Away					
Pld	W	D	L	GF	GA	GD	Pts	W	D	L	GF	GA	GD	W	D	L	GF	GA	GD
30	13	4	13	37	38	−1	43	6	3	6	20	17	+3	7	1	7	17	21	−4

Source: 90minut.pl

===== Results by round =====
Round	1	2	3	4	5	6	7	8	9	10	11	12	13	14	15	16	17	18	19	20	21	22	23	24	25	26	27	28	29	30
Ground	H	H	A	H	A	H	A	H	A	H	A	H	A	A	H	A	A	H	A	H	A	H	A	H	A	H	A	H	H	A
Result	L	W	L	D	L	L	L	L	L	D	L	D	W	D	W	W	W	W	W	W	L	W	L	L	W	W	W	L	L	W
Position	12	7	12	11	13	14	14	15	16	16	16	16	15	15	15	14	12	10	7	5	6	5	6	8	5	5	5	6	6	6

Source: 90minut.pl
A = Away; H = Home; W = Win; D = Draw; L = Loss

===== Matches =====
Win Draw Loss

18 July 2015 Match 1	Lech Poznań	1 – 2	Pogoń Szczecin	INEA Stadion, Poznań
20:30 CEST (UTC+02:00)	Jevtić 26'	Ekstraklasa Report	Zwoliński 21'; Lewandowski 39'	Attendance: 15,131; Referee: Tomasz Kwiatkowski (Warsaw)

25 July 2015 Match 2	Lech Poznań	2 – 1	Lechia Gdańsk	INEA Stadion, Poznań
20:30 CEST (UTC+02:00)	Hämäläinen 19'; Robak 90+2'	Ekstraklasa Report	Janicki 75'	Attendance: 13,821; Referee: Daniel Stefański (Bydgoszcz)

1 August 2015 Match 3	Wisła Kraków	2 – 0	Lech Poznań	Stadion Miejski im. Henryka Reymana, Kraków
20:30 CEST (UTC+02:00)	Boguski 7', 90+3'	Ekstraklasa Report		Attendance: 13,623; Referee: Szymon Marciniak (Płock)

8 August 2015 Match 4	Lech Poznań	0 – 0	Korona Kielce	INEA Stadion, Poznań
20:30 CEST (UTC+02:00)		Ekstraklasa Report		Attendance: 13,134; Referee: Krzysztof Jakubik (Siedlce)

14 August 2015 Match 5	Zagłębie Lubin	2 – 1	Lech Poznań	Stadion Zagłębia Lubin, Lubin
20:30 CEST (UTC+02:00)	Janus 7'; Piątek 45+1'	Ekstraklasa Report	Robak 90+3'	Attendance: 10,217; Referee: Tomasz Musiał (Kraków)

23 August 2015 Match 6	Lech Poznań	0 – 1	Piast Gliwice	INEA Stadion, Poznań
15:30 CEST (UTC+02:00)		Ekstraklasa Report	Vacek 44'	Attendance: 17,456; Referee: Bartosz Frankowski (Toruń)

30 August 2015 Match 7	Termalica Bruk-Bet Nieciecza	3 – 1	Lech Poznań	Stadion Stali Mielec, Mielec
15:30 CEST (UTC+02:00)	Kędziora 16'; Pleva 26'; Babiarz 88'	Ekstraklasa Report	Formella 69'	Attendance: 4,950; Referee: Krzysztof Jakubik (Siedlce)

12 September 2015 Match 8	Lech Poznań	0 – 1	Podbeskidzie Bielsko-Biała	INEA Stadion, Poznań
20:30 CEST (UTC+02:00)		Ekstraklasa Report	Szczepaniak 57'	Attendance: 11,902; Referee: Paweł Gil (Lublin)

20 September 2015 Match 9	Jagiellonia Białystok	1 – 0	Lech Poznań	Stadion Miejski, Białystok
18:00 CEST (UTC+02:00)	Frankowski 29'	Ekstraklasa Report		Attendance: 19,177; Referee: Tomasz Musiał (Kraków)

26 September 2015 Match 10	Lech Poznań	1 – 1	Górnik Zabrze	INEA Stadion, Poznań
20:30 CEST (UTC+02:00)	Kownacki 66'	Ekstraklasa Report	Gergel 75' (pen.)	Attendance: 15,467; Referee: Paweł Raczkowski (Warsaw)

4 October 2015 Match 11	Cracovia	5 – 2	Lech Poznań	Stadion im. Marszałka Józefa Piłsudskiego, Kraków
18:00 CEST (UTC+02:00)	Kapustka 1'; Rakels 4'; Cetnarski 40' (pen.); Jendrišek 63'; Wójcicki 74'	Ekstraklasa Report	Hämäläinen 56', 75'	Attendance: 8,236; Referee: Daniel Stefański (Bydgoszcz)

17 October 2015 Match 12	Lech Poznań	2 – 2	Ruch Chorzów	INEA Stadion, Poznań
18:00 CEST (UTC+02:00)	Pawłowski 42'; Kamiński 83'	Ekstraklasa Report	Stępiński 2', 26'	Attendance: 15,783; Referee: Tomasz Musiał (Kraków)

25 October 2015 Match 13	Legia Warsaw	0 – 1	Lech Poznań	Polish Army Stadium, Warsaw
18:00 CEST (UTC+02:00)		Ekstraklasa Report	Hämäläinen 8'	Attendance: 26,821; Referee: Bartosz Frankowski (Toruń)

31 October 2015 Match 14	Śląsk Wrocław	1 – 1	Lech Poznań	Stadion Miejski, Wrocław
20:30 CEST (UTC+02:00)	Paixão 23'	Ekstraklasa Report	Gajos 60'	Attendance: 8,499; Referee: Marcin Borski (Warsaw)

8 November 2015 Match 15	Lech Poznań	3 – 1	Górnik Łęczna	INEA Stadion, Poznań
15:30 CET (UTC+01:00)	Gajos 5', 71'; Linetty 81'	Ekstraklasa Report	Leândro 90'	Attendance: 23,197; Referee: Szymon Marciniak (Płock)

22 November 2015 Match 16	Pogoń Szczecin	0 – 2	Lech Poznań	Stadion Miejski im. Floriana Krygiera, Szczecin
18:00 CET (UTC+01:00)		Ekstraklasa Report	Hämäläinen 11'; Trałka 63'	Attendance: 9,234; Referee: Tomasz Kwiatkowski (Warsaw)

29 November 2015 Match 17	Lechia Gdańsk	0 – 1	Lech Poznań	Stadion Energa, Gdańsk
15:30 CET (UTC+01:00)		Ekstraklasa Report	Hämäläinen 63'	Attendance: 14,260; Referee: Krzysztof Jakubik (Siedlce)

2 December 2015 Match 18	Lech Poznań	2 – 0	Wisła Kraków	INEA Stadion, Poznań
20:30 CET (UTC+01:00)	Kownacki 20' (pen.); Pawłowski 86'	Ekstraklasa Report		Attendance: 13,279; Referee: Daniel Stefański (Bydgoszcz)

5 December 2015 Match 19	Korona Kielce	0 – 1	Lech Poznań	Kolporter Arena, Kielce
15:30 CET (UTC+01:00)		Ekstraklasa Report	Hämäläinen 33'	Attendance: 6,780; Referee: Mariusz Złotek (Stalowa Wola)

13 December 2015 Match 20	Lech Poznań	2 – 0	Zagłębie Lubin	INEA Stadion, Poznań
15:30 CET (UTC+01:00)	Hämäläinen 16'; Pawłowski 64'	Ekstraklasa Report		Attendance: 14,562; Referee: Paweł Raczkowski (Warsaw)

20 December 2015 Match 21	Piast Gliwice	2 – 0	Lech Poznań	Stadion Miejski, Gliwice
18:00 CET (UTC+01:00)	Szeliga 15'; Barišić 48'	Ekstraklasa Report		Attendance: 7,552; Referee: Mariusz Złotek (Stalowa Wola)

14 February 2016 Match 22	Lech Poznań	5 – 2	Termalica Bruk-Bet Nieciecza	INEA Stadion, Poznań
15:30 CET (UTC+01:00)	Pawłowski 12', 57'; Bille 43'; Kownacki 90' (pen.), 90+2'	Ekstraklasa Report	Kędziora 44', 50'	Attendance: 17,148; Referee: Paweł Gil (Lublin)

20 February 2016 Match 23	Podbeskidzie Bielsko-Biała	4 – 1	Lech Poznań	Stadion Miejski, Bielsko-Biała
18:00 CET (UTC+01:00)	Demjan 17'; Sokołowski 65'; Szczepaniak 80'; Kowalski 88'	Ekstraklasa Report	Kownacki 62'	Attendance: 4,520; Referee: Paweł Raczkowski (Warsaw)

28 February 2016 Match 24	Lech Poznań	0 – 2	Jagiellonia Białystok	INEA Stadion, Poznań
15:30 CET (UTC+01:00)		Ekstraklasa Report	Tarasovs 26'; Tomasik 40' (pen.)	Attendance: 14,366; Referee: Mariusz Złotek (Stalowa Wola)

2 March 2016 Match 25	Górnik Zabrze	0 – 2	Lech Poznań	Stadion im. Ernesta Pohla, Zabrze
20:30 CET (UTC+01:00)		Ekstraklasa Report	Kownacki 29'; Pawłowski 61'	Attendance: 12,453; Referee: Krzysztof Jakubik (Siedlce)

6 March 2016 Match 26	Lech Poznań	2 – 1	Cracovia	INEA Stadion, Poznań
18:00 CET (UTC+01:00)	Jevtić 9'; Gajos 86'	Ekstraklasa Report	Kapustka 8'	Attendance: 24,813; Referee: Daniel Stefański (Bydgoszcz)

12 March 2016 Match 27	Ruch Chorzów	1 – 3	Lech Poznań	Stadion Miejski, Chorzów
20:30 CET (UTC+01:00)	Stępiński 63'	Ekstraklasa Report	Gajos 44'; Jevtić 56', 71'	Attendance: 9,000; Referee: Szymon Marciniak (Płock)

19 March 2016 Match 28	Lech Poznań	0 – 2	Legia Warsaw	INEA Stadion, Poznań
20:30 CET (UTC+01:00)		Ekstraklasa Report	Nikolić 42', 45' (pen.)	Attendance: 41,567; Referee: Szymon Marciniak (Płock)

1 April 2016 Match 29	Lech Poznań	0 – 1	Śląsk Wrocław	INEA Stadion, Poznań
20:30 CEST (UTC+02:00)		Ekstraklasa Report	Morioka 10'	Attendance: 17,697; Referee: Tomasz Kwiatkowski (Warsaw)

9 April 2016 Match 30	Górnik Łęczna	0 – 1	Lech Poznań	Stadion Górnika, Łęczna
18:00 CEST (UTC+02:00)		Ekstraklasa Report	Bille 42'	Attendance: 6,247; Referee: Krzysztof Jakubik (Siedlce)

==== Championship round ====
===== League table =====
Pos	Team	Pld	W	D	L	GF	GA	GD	Pts	Qualification
1	Legia Warsaw (C)	37	21	10	6	70	32	+38	43	Qualification for the Champions League second qualifying round (Note: Legia Warsaw qualified for the Europa League second qualifying round by winning the 2015–16 Polish Cup. However, since they already qualified for European competition based on their league position, the spot awarded to the cup winners was passed down the league.)
2	Piast Gliwice	37	20	9	8	60	45	+15	40	Qualification for the Europa League second qualifying round
3	Zagłębie Lubin	37	17	9	11	55	42	+13	38	Qualification for the Europa League first qualifying round
4	Cracovia	37	16	10	11	66	50	+16	36	Qualification for the Europa League first qualifying round
5	Lechia Gdańsk (Note: Lechia Gdańsk were punished with a deduction of one point during regular season for failing with licensing requirements. On 8 April 2016 the punishment was suspended by Polish Court of Arbitration for Sport.On 11 April 2016 an appeal against the original decision was withdrawn by the club.)	37	14	10	13	53	44	+9	32	
6	Pogoń Szczecin	37	12	17	8	43	43	0	30	
7	Lech Poznań	37	14	6	17	42	47	−5	27	
8	Ruch Chorzów (Note: Ruch Chorzów were punished with a deduction of one point during regular season for failing with licensing requirements.)	37	11	8	18	40	60	−20	21	

Source: Ekstraklasa, Soccerway
Rules for classification: 1) Points; 2) Points in regular season; 3) Head-to-head points in regular season; 4) Head-to-head goal difference in regular season; 5) Head-to-head goals scored in regular season; 5) Head-to-head away goals scored in regular season (if only two teams); 7) Goal difference; 8) Goals scored; 9) Fairplay ranking; 10) Play-off (only if needed to decide champion, teams for relegation or teams for UEFA competitions).
(C) Champions

===== Results summary =====
Overall								Home						Away					
Pld	W	D	L	GF	GA	GD	Pts	W	D	L	GF	GA	GD	W	D	L	GF	GA	GD
37	14	6	17	42	47	−5	27	7	5	6	25	19	+6	7	1	11	17	28	−11

Source: 90minut.pl

===== Results by round =====
Round	1	2	3	4	5	6	7
Ground	A	H	A	H	A	A	H
Result	L	D	L	D	L	L	W
Position	6	7	7	7	7	7	7

Source: 90minut.pl
A = Away; H = Home; W = Win; D = Draw; L = Loss

===== Matches =====
Win Draw Loss

15 April 2016 Match 31	Legia Warsaw	1 – 0	Lech Poznań	Polish Army Stadium, Warsaw
20:30 CEST (UTC+02:00)	Prijović 63'	Report		Attendance: 28,286; Referee: Daniel Stefański (Bydgoszcz)

19 April 2016 Match 32	Lech Poznań	2 – 2	Piast Gliwice	INEA Stadion, Poznań
18:00 CEST (UTC+02:00)	Linetty 6'; Bille 38'	Report	Živec 51'; Mráz 61'	Attendance: 10,289; Referee: Bartosz Frankowski (Toruń)

23 April 2016 Match 33	Pogoń Szczecin	1 – 0	Lech Poznań	Stadion Miejski im. Floriana Krygiera, Szczecin
20:30 CEST (UTC+02:00)	Zwoliński 59'	Report		Attendance: 7,754; Referee: Daniel Stefański (Bydgoszcz)

28 April 2016 Match 34	Lech Poznań	0 – 0	Lechia Gdańsk	INEA Stadion, Poznań
18:00 CEST (UTC+02:00)		Report		Attendance: 10,770; Referee: Jarosław Przybył (Kluczbork)

8 May 2016 Match 35	Cracovia	2 – 0	Lech Poznań	Stadion im. Marszałka Józefa Piłsudskiego, Kraków
15:30 CEST (UTC+02:00)	Jendrišek 14'; Budziński 42'	Report		Attendance: 10,586; Referee: Krzysztof Jakubik (Siedlce)

11 May 2016 Match 36	Zagłębie Lubin	3 – 0	Lech Poznań	Stadion Zagłębia Lubin, Lubin
20:30 CEST (UTC+02:00)	Dąbrowski 50', 68'; Woźniak 88'	Report		Attendance: 9,489; Referee: Szymon Marciniak (Płock)

15 May 2016 Match 37	Lech Poznań	3 – 0	Ruch Chorzów	INEA Stadion, Poznań
18:00 CEST (UTC+02:00)	Jóźwiak 25'; Linetty 82'; Gajos 85'	Report		Attendance: 11,319; Referee: Marcin Borski (Warsaw)

=== Polish Cup ===
11 August 2015 Round of 32	Olimpia Grudziądz	0 – 2	Lech Poznań	Bronisław Malinowski Stadium, Grudziądz
18:00 CEST (UTC+02:00)			Holman 9', 86'	Attendance: 4,000; Referee: Marek Opaliński (Legnica)

23 September 2015 Round of 16	Lech Poznań	1 – 0	Ruch Chorzów	INEA Stadion, Poznań
20:30 CEST (UTC+02:00)	Grodzicki 50' (o.g.)			Attendance: 11,273; Referee: Marcin Borski (Warsaw)

==== Quarterfinals ====
28 October 2015 First Leg	Zagłębie Lubin	0 – 1	Lech Poznań	Stadion Zagłębia, Lubin
20:30 CEST (UTC+02:00)			Arajuuri 81'	Attendance: 4,587; Referee: Paweł Gil (Lublin)

19 November 2015 Second Leg	Lech Poznań	1 – 0 (2 – 0 agg.)	Zagłębie Lubin	INEA Stadion, Poznań
20:45 CET (UTC+01:00)	Pawłowski 90+3'			Attendance: 9,271; Referee: Jarosław Przybył (Kluczbork)

==== Semifinals ====
15 March 2016 First Leg	Lech Poznań	1 – 0	Zagłębie Sosnowiec	INEA Stadion, Poznań
18:30 CET (UTC+01:00)	Volkov 38'			Attendance: 12,885; Referee: Jarosław Przybył (Kluczbork)

5 April 2016 Second Leg	Zagłębie Sosnowiec	1 – 1 (1 – 2 agg.)	Lech Poznań	Stadion Ludowy, Sosnowiec
18:00 CEST (UTC+02:00)	Paluchowski 82'		Gajos 70'	Attendance: 4,950; Referee: Bartosz Frankowski (Toruń)

==== Final ====
2 May 2016 Final	Lech Poznań	0 – 1	Legia Warsaw	PGE Narodowy, Warsaw
16:00 CEST (UTC+02:00)		Report	Prijović 69'	Attendance: 48,563; Referee: Szymon Marciniak (Płock)

=== Polish Super Cup ===
10 July 2015 Polish Super Cup	Lech Poznań	3 – 1	Legia Warsaw	INEA Stadion, Poznań
20:15 CEST (UTC+02:00)	Kędziora 10'; Kamiński 35'; Linetty 87'		Żyro 90+5'	Attendance: 40,088; Referee: Mariusz Złotek (Stalowa Wola)

=== UEFA Champions League ===
==== Second qualifying round ====
14 July 2015 First Leg	FK Sarajevo (Bosnia and Herzegovina)	0 – 2	(Poland) Lech Poznań	Asim Ferhatović Hase Stadium, Sarajevo
21:00 CEST (UTC+02:00)		Report	Hämäläinen 40'; Thomalla 62'	Attendance: 16,500; Referee: Paolo Valeri (Italy)

22 July 2015 Second Leg	Lech Poznań (Poland)	1 – 0 (3 – 0 agg.)	(Bosnia and Herzegovina) FK Sarajevo	INEA Stadion, Poznań
20:45 CEST (UTC+02:00)	Douglas 6'	Report		Attendance: 22,205; Referee: Kevin Clancy (Scotland)

==== Third qualifying round ====
29 July 2015 First Leg	Lech Poznań (Poland)	1 – 3	(Switzerland) Basel	INEA Stadion, Poznań
20:45 CEST (UTC+02:00)	Thomalla 36'	Report	Lang 34'; Janko 77'; Callà 90+2'	Attendance: 25,478; Referee: Anthony Taylor (England)

5 August 2015 Second Leg	Basel (Switzerland)	1 – 0 (4 – 1 agg.)	(Poland) Lech Poznań	St. Jakob-Park, Basel
20:15 CEST (UTC+02:00)	Bjarnason 90+1'	Report		Attendance: 18,196; Referee: Ruddy Buquet (France)

=== UEFA Europa League ===
==== Play-off round ====
20 August 2015 First Leg	Lech Poznań (Poland)	3 – 0	(Hungary) Videoton	INEA Stadion, Poznań
21:00 CEST (UTC+02:00)	Linetty 11'; Thomalla 57'; Trałka 68'	Report		Attendance: 14,133; Referee: Oliver Drachta (Austria)

27 August 2015 Second Leg	Videoton (Hungary)	0 – 1 (0 – 4 agg.)	(Poland) Lech Poznań	Sóstói Stadion, Székesfehérvár
19:00 CEST (UTC+02:00)		Report	Kędziora 57'	Attendance: 2,815; Referee: Stefan Johannesson (Sweden)

==== Group stage ====
Pos	Team	Pld	W	D	L	GF	GA	GD	Pts	Qualification	BSL	FIO	LCH	BEL
1	(Switzerland) Basel	6	4	1	1	10	5	+5	13	Advance to knockout phase	—	2–2	2–0	1–2
2	(Italy) Fiorentina	6	3	1	2	11	6	+5	10	Advance to knockout phase	1–2	—	1–2	1–0
3	(Poland) Lech Poznań	6	1	2	3	2	6	−4	5		0–1	0–2	—	0–0
4	(Portugal) Belenenses	6	1	2	3	2	8	−6	5		0–2	0–4	0–0	—

Source: Soccerway
Rules for classification: Group stage tiebreakers

17 September 2015 Round 1	Lech Poznań (Poland)	0 – 0	(Portugal) Belenenses	INEA Stadion, Poznań
21:05 CEST (UTC+02:00)		Report		Attendance: 7,934; Referee: Serhiy Boyko (Ukraine)

1 October 2015 Round 2	Basel (Switzerland)	2 – 0	(Poland) Lech Poznań	St. Jakob-Park, Basel
19:00 CEST (UTC+02:00)	Bjarnason 55'; Embolo 90'	Report		Attendance: 17,567; Referee: Ognjen Valjić (Bosnia and Herzegovina)

22 October 2015 Round 3	Fiorentina (Italy)	1 – 2	(Poland) Lech Poznań	Stadio Artemio Franchi, Florence
19:00 CEST (UTC+02:00)	Rossi 90'	Report	Kownacki 65'; Gajos 82'	Attendance: 13,792; Referee: Gediminas Mažeika (Lithuania)

5 November 2015 Round 4	Lech Poznań (Poland)	0 – 2	(Italy) Fiorentina	INEA Stadion, Poznań
21:05 CET (UTC+01:00)		Report	Iličić 42', 83'	Attendance: 22,343; Referee: Halis Özkahya (Turkey)

26 November 2015 Round 5	Belenenses (Portugal)	0 – 0	(Poland) Lech Poznań	Estádio do Restelo, Lisbon
19:00 CET (UTC+01:00)		Report		Attendance: 1,987; Referee: Arnold Hunter (Northern Ireland)

10 December 2015 Round 6	Lech Poznań (Poland)	0 – 1	(Switzerland) Basel	INEA Stadion, Poznań
21:05 CET (UTC+01:00)		Report	Boëtius 50'	Attendance: 10,457; Referee: Bobby Madden (Scotland)

== Squad statistics ==
=== Appearances and goals ===
No.	Pos	Nat	Player	Total		Ekstraklasa		Polish Cup		Polish Super Cup		UEFA Champions League UEFA Europa League	
No.	Pos	Nat	Player	Apps	Goals	Apps	Goals	Apps	Goals	Apps	Goals	Apps	Goals
1	GK	(Bosnia and Herzegovina) BIH	Jasmin Burić	52	0	35	0	5	0	1	0	11	0
2	DF	(Poland) POL	Robert Gumny	5	0	2+2	0	0+1	0	0	0	0	0
3	DF	(Montenegro) MNE	Vladimir Volkov	8	1	5+2	0	1	1	0	0	0	0
4	DF	(Poland) POL	Tomasz Kędziora	38	2	23+1	0	4	0	1	1	9	1
5	DF	(Hungary) HUN	Tamás Kádár	44	0	27+2	0	3+1	0	1	0	10	0
6	MF	(Poland) POL	Łukasz Trałka	49	2	28+2	1	5+1	0	1	0	11+1	1
7	MF	(Poland) POL	Karol Linetty	41	5	26+2	3	2+1	0	1	1	8+1	1
8	MF	(Poland) POL	Szymon Pawłowski	46	7	29+2	6	2+2	1	1	0	8+2	0
10	MF	(Switzerland) SUI	Darko Jevtić	37	4	15+11	4	3+2	0	0+1	0	3+2	0
11	FW	(Hungary) HUN	Gergő Lovrencsics	38	0	20+3	0	2+3	0	0	0	4+6	0
14	MF	(Poland) POL	Maciej Gajos	38	8	21+7	6	3+2	1	0	0	3+2	1
15	DF	(Poland) POL	Dariusz Dudka	24	0	7+2	0	4+1	0	0+1	0	8+1	0
19	FW	(Denmark) DEN	Nicki Bille Nielsen	12	3	9+1	3	1+1	0	0	0	0	0
21	DF	(The Gambia) GAM	Kebba Ceesay	27	0	14+4	0	4	0	0+1	0	3+1	0
22	FW	(Poland) POL	Marcin Robak	13	2	5+3	2	0+1	0	1	0	0+3	0
23	DF	(Finland) FIN	Paulus Arajuuri	36	1	27+1	0	5	1	0	0	3	0
24	FW	(Poland) POL	Dawid Kownacki	34	7	11+13	6	4	0	1	0	4+1	1
25	MF	(Spain) ESP	Sisi	5	0	3+1	0	1	0	0	0	0	0
26	DF	(Poland) POL	Maciej Wilusz	7	0	5	0	2	0	0	0	0	0
27	GK	(Poland) POL	Krzysztof Kotorowski	0	0	0	0	0	0	0	0	0	0
29	MF	(Poland) POL	Kamil Jóźwiak	13	1	3+7	1	0+3	0	0	0	0	0
30	GK	(Poland) POL	Adam Makuchowski	0	0	0	0	0	0	0	0	0	0
31	MF	(Poland) POL	Krystian Sanocki	0	0	0	0	0	0	0	0	0	0
34	FW	(Poland) POL	Piotr Kurbiel	3	0	0+2	0	0	0	0	0	0+1	0
35	DF	(Poland) POL	Marcin Kamiński	54	2	31+4	1	7	0	1	1	11	0
36	GK	(Poland) POL	Mateusz Lis	0	0	0	0	0	0	0	0	0	0
37	MF	(Germany) GER	Niklas Zulciak	0	0	0	0	0	0	0	0	0	0
39	DF	(Poland) POL	Tomasz Dejewski	0	0	0	0	0	0	0	0	0	0
55	MF	(Ghana) GHA	Abdul Aziz Tetteh	38	0	25+3	0	4	0	0	0	3+3	0
Players away from the club on loan:
18	FW	(Germany) GER	Denis Thomalla	27	3	3+10	0	3	0	0+1	0	8+2	3
28	MF	(Poland) POL	Dariusz Formella	36	1	1+18	1	4	0	0+1	0	9+3	0
Players who appeared for Lech and left the club during the season:
3	DF	(Scotland) SCO	Barry Douglas	23	1	13	0	2	0	1	0	7	1
19	MF	(Finland) FIN	Kasper Hämäläinen	31	9	15	8	1+2	0	1	0	7+5	1
20	MF	(Hungary) HUN	Dávid Holman	9	2	2+1	0	3	2	0	0	1+2	0
33	GK	(Poland) POL	Maciej Gostomski	5	0	2	0	2	0	0	0	1	0

=== Goalscorers ===
Place	Position	Number	Nation	Name	Ekstraklasa	Polish Cup	Polish Super Cup	UCL UEL	Total
1	MF	19	(Finland)	Kasper Hämäläinen	8	0	0	1	9
2	MF	14	(Poland)	Maciej Gajos	6	1	0	1	8
3	MF	8	(Poland)	Szymon Pawłowski	6	1	0	0	7
3	FW	24	(Poland)	Dawid Kownacki	6	0	0	1	7
5	MF	7	(Poland)	Karol Linetty	3	0	1	1	5
6	MF	10	(Switzerland)	Darko Jevtić	4	0	0	0	4
7	FW	19	(Denmark)	Nicki Bille Nielsen	3	0	0	0	3
7	FW	18	(Germany)	Denis Thomalla	0	0	0	3	3
9	DF	4	(Poland)	Tomasz Kędziora	0	0	1	1	2
9	MF	6	(Poland)	Łukasz Trałka	1	0	0	1	2
9	MF	20	(Hungary)	Dávid Holman	0	2	0	0	2
9	FW	22	(Poland)	Marcin Robak	2	0	0	0	2
9	DF	35	(Poland)	Marcin Kamiński	1	0	1	0	2
14	MF	29	(Poland)	Kamil Jóźwiak	1	0	0	0	1
14	DF	3	(Scotland)	Barry Douglas	0	0	0	1	1
14	DF	3	(Montenegro)	Vladimir Volkov	0	1	0	0	1
14	DF	23	(Finland)	Paulus Arajuuri	0	1	0	0	1
14	MF	28	(Poland)	Dariusz Formella	1	0	0	0	1
				TOTALS	42	6	3	10	61

=== Clean sheets ===
Place	Number	Nation	Name	Ekstraklasa	Polish Cup	Polish Super Cup	UCL UEL	Total
1	1	(Bosnia and Herzegovina)	Jasmin Burić	10	3	0	6	19
2	33	(Poland)	Maciej Gostomski	0	2	–	0	2
3	27	(Poland)	Krzysztof Kotorowski	–	–	–	–	–
3	30	(Poland)	Adam Makuchowski	–	–	–	–	–
3	36	(Poland)	Mateusz Lis	–	–	–	–	–
			TOTALS	10	5	0	6	21

=== Disciplinary record ===
Number	Position	Nation	Name	Ekstraklasa		Polish Cup		Polish Super Cup		UCL; UEL		Total	
Number	Position	Nation	Name	Booked	Sent off (straight red)	Booked	Sent off (straight red)	Booked	Sent off (straight red)	Booked	Sent off (straight red)	Booked	Sent off (straight red)
1	GK	(Bosnia and Herzegovina)	Jasmin Burić	0	0	0	0	0	0	1	0	1	0
2	DF	(Poland)	Robert Gumny	1	0	0	0	–				1	0
3	DF	(Montenegro)	Vladimir Volkov	1	0	1	0	–				2	0
4	DF	(Poland)	Tomasz Kędziora	4	0	1	0	0	0	1	1	6	1
5	DF	(Hungary)	Tamás Kádár	8	0	0	0	1	0	2	0	11	0
6	MF	(Poland)	Łukasz Trałka	11	0	2	0	0	0	1	0	14	0
7	MF	(Poland)	Karol Linetty	5	0	0	0	0	0	7	1	12	1
8	MF	(Poland)	Szymon Pawłowski	2	0	1	0	0	0	0	0	3	0
10	MF	(Switzerland)	Darko Jevtić	5	0	0	0	0	0	1	0	6	0
11	FW	(Hungary)	Gergő Lovrencsics	2	0	0	0	–		1	0	3	0
14	MF	(Poland)	Maciej Gajos	1	0	0	0	–		0	0	1	0
15	DF	(Poland)	Dariusz Dudka	3	1	0	0	0	0	3	0	6	1
19	FW	(Denmark)	Nicki Bille Nielsen	0	0	0	0	–				0	0
21	DF	(The Gambia)	Kebba Ceesay	3	0	1	0	0	0	1	0	5	0
22	FW	(Poland)	Marcin Robak	0	0	0	0	1	0	0	0	1	0
23	DF	(Finland)	Paulus Arajuuri	4	0	0	0	–		0	0	4	0
24	FW	(Poland)	Dawid Kownacki	1	0	0	0	0	0	0	0	1	0
25	MF	(Spain)	Sisi	0	0	0	0	–				0	0
26	DF	(Poland)	Maciej Wilusz	0	0	0	0	–				0	0
27	GK	(Poland)	Krzysztof Kotorowski	–								–	
29	MF	(Poland)	Kamil Jóźwiak	3	0	0	0	–				3	0
30	GK	(Poland)	Adam Makuchowski	–								–	
31	MF	(Poland)	Krystian Sanocki	–								–	
34	FW	(Poland)	Piotr Kurbiel	0	0	–				0	0	0	0
35	DF	(Poland)	Marcin Kamiński	5	0	1	0	0	0	1	0	7	0
36	GK	(Poland)	Mateusz Lis	–								–	
37	MF	(Germany)	Niklas Zulciak	–								–	
39	DF	(Poland)	Tomasz Dejewski	–								–	
55	MF	(Ghana)	Abdul Aziz Tetteh	6	0	2	0	–		0	0	8	0
Players away from the club on loan:
18	FW	(Germany)	Denis Thomalla	0	0	0	0	0	0	2	0	2	0
28	MF	(Poland)	Dariusz Formella	2	0	0	0	0	0	2	0	4	0
Players who appeared for Lech and left the club during the season:
3	DF	(Scotland)	Barry Douglas	5	0	0	0	1	0	1	0	7	0
19	MF	(Finland)	Kasper Hämäläinen	1	0	0	0	0	0	0	0	1	0
20	MF	(Hungary)	Dávid Holman	1	0	0	0	–		0	0	1	0
33	GK	(Poland)	Maciej Gostomski	0	0	0	0	–		0	0	0	0
			TOTALS	74	1	9	0	3	0	24	2	110	3
