= Atanacković =

Atanacković or Atanackovic is a surname. Notable people with the surname include:

- Aleksandar Atanacković (disambiguation)
  - Aleksandar Atanacković (footballer, born 1920) (1920–2005), Serbian footballer
  - Aleksandar Atanacković (footballer, born 1980), Serbian footballer
- Bogoboj Atanacković (1826–1858), Serbian writer
- Branislav Atanacković (born 1983), Serbian football player
- Jovan Atanacković (1848–1921), Serbian general
- Marko Atanackovic (born 1986), Swedish football player
- Platon Atanacković (1788–1867), Serbian writer, linguist, and bishop
- Simo Atanacković (born 1990), Slovenian-Bosnian basketball player
- Teodor Atanackovic (born 1945), Serbian engineer
