= Maciej Gostomski =

Polish footballer

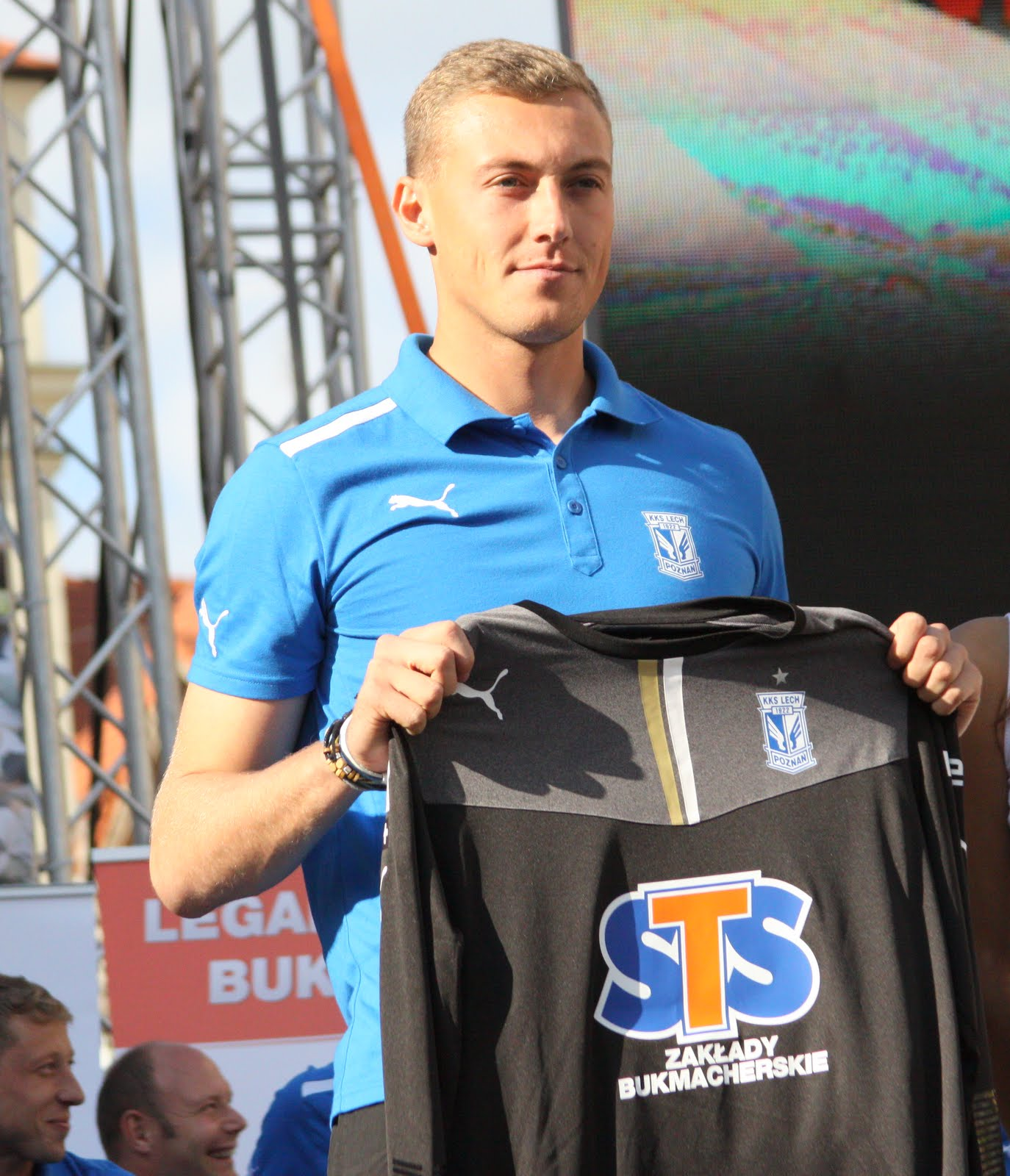
- Gostomski in 2013 with Lech Poznań during presentation

Personal information
- Date of birth: 27 September 1988 (age 38)
- Place of birth: Kartuzy, Poland
- Height: 1.95 m (6 ft 5 in)
- Position: Goalkeeper

Team information
- Current team: Stal Mielec
- Number: 99

Youth career
- Cartusia Kartuzy
- 2003: Kaszubia Kościerzyna
- 2004: MSP Szamotuły

Senior career*
Years	Team	Apps	(Gls)
2004–2005	Uran Trzebicz		
2005	Sokół Pniewy		
2006–2010	Legia Warsaw	0	(0)
2008–2009	→ Zagłębie Sosnowiec (loan)	34	(0)
2010–2011	Odra Wodzisław	0	(0)
2011	Bałtyk Gdynia	6	(0)
2011–2013	Bytovia Bytów	53	(0)
2013–2015	Lech Poznań	44	(0)
2013–2015	Lech Poznań II	11	(0)
2016	Rangers	0	(0)
2016–2018	Korona Kielce	20	(0)
2017	→ Chojniczanka (loan)	3	(0)
2018–2019	Cracovia	11	(0)
2019	Haugesund	0	(0)
2020	Bytovia Bytów	15	(0)
2020–2024	Górnik Łęczna	132	(0)
2024–2026	Wisła Płock	17	(0)
2025	Wisła Płock II	1	(0)
2026–	Stal Mielec	14	(0)
- * Club domestic league appearances and goals as of 21:15, 26 May 2026 (UTC)

Maciej Gostomski (born 27 September 1988) is a Polish professional footballer who plays as a goalkeeper for I liga club Stal Mielec.

== Career ==
Gostomski was born in Kartuzy. At Legia Warsaw he was the third-choice goalkeeper behind Ján Mucha and Wojciech Skaba and played primarily for Młoda Ekstraklasa. He fell out of favour after a series of photos were leaked to the media of him smoking and throwing a pineapple at an apartment window.

He had a series of short spells at various clubs, including Bałtyk Gdynia which he joined on a one-year contract in February 2011. He became a part-time player, working also as a fisherman. His fortunes changed after joining II liga side Bytovia Bytów in mid-2011.

On 28 June 2013, Gostomski moved to Ekstraklasa club Lech Poznań on a free transfer. Brought in as a third-choice goalkeeper behind Krzysztof Kotorowski and Jasmin Burić, Gostomski became a regular starter mid-way through the season, and kept his position in the starting line-up for the majority of the 2013–14 and 2014–15 campaigns. On 24 May 2015, Gostomski replaced the injured Burić in the 82nd minute of an away game against Lechia Gdańsk. After a crucial save from Antonio Čolak in stoppage time, Gostomski secured a 2–1 win which moved Lech to the top of the table with three games to go; Lech went on to win the title. He left the club on 31 December 2015 upon the expiration of his contract.

On 3 January 2016, Gostomski signed a six-month contract with Scottish side Rangers. He became Mark Warburton's second signing of the 2016 January transfer window. In March 2016, he was released from his contract at Rangers just over two months after joining the club.

Gostomski signed for Korona Kielce on 9 June 2016.

On 11 August 2020, he signed a one-year deal with Górnik Łęczna.

After spending four years with the Lublin side, three of them as the team's captain, Gostomski announced on 13 June 2024 that he would leave Górnik at the end of his contract in June.

Later that day, Wisła Płock announced the signing of Gostomski on a two-year deal. A first-choice goalkeeper in the first half of the 2024–25 campaign, his season was cut short by a MCL injury suffered during training in January 2025.

On 6 January 2026, he moved to I liga club Stal Mielec on a six-month contract.

== Career statistics ==
As of match played 15 May 2026

Appearances and goals by club, season and competition
Club	Season	League			National cup (Note: Includes Polish Cup)		Europe		Other		Total	
Club	Season	Division	Apps	Goals	Apps	Goals	Apps	Goals	Apps	Goals	Apps	Goals
Zagłębie Sosnowiec (loan)	2008–09	II liga West	32	0	0	0	—		2 (Note: Appearances in II liga promotion/relegation play-offs)	0	34	0
Legia Warsaw	2009–10	Ekstraklasa	0	0	0	0	0	0	0	0	0	0
Odra Wodzisław	2010–11	I liga	0	0	0	0	—		—		0	0
Bałtyk Gdynia	2010–11	II liga West	6	0	—		—		—		6	0
Bytovia Bytów	2011–12	II liga West	20	0	0	0	—		—		20	0
Bytovia Bytów	2012–13	II liga West	33	0	1	0	—		—		33	0
Bytovia Bytów	Total		53	0	1	0	0	0	0	0	54	0
Lech Poznań	2013–14	Ekstraklasa	21	0	1	0	0	0	—		22	0
Lech Poznań	2014–15	Ekstraklasa	21	0	4	0	0	0	—		25	0
Lech Poznań	2015–16	Ekstraklasa	2	0	2	0	1 (Note: Appearance in UEFA Europa League)	0	0	0	5	0
Lech Poznań	Total		44	0	7	0	1	0	0	0	52	0
Lech Poznań II	2013–14	III liga, group C	5	0	—		—		—		5	0
Lech Poznań II	2014–15	III liga, group C	2	0	—		—		—		2	0
Lech Poznań II	2015–16	III liga, group C	4	0	—		—		—		4	0
Lech Poznań II	Total		11	0	0	0	—		—		11	0
Rangers	2015–16	Scottish Championship	0	0	0	0	—		0	0	0	0
Korona Kielce	2016–17	Ekstraklasa	8	0	1	0	—		—		9	0
Korona Kielce	2017–18	Ekstraklasa	12	0	2	0	—		—		14	0
Korona Kielce	Total		20	0	3	0	—		—		23	0
Chojniczanka (loan)	2016–17	I liga	3	0	—		—		—		3	0
Cracovia	2018–19	Ekstraklasa	11	0	0	0	—		—		11	0
Haugesund	2018–19	Eliteserien	0	0	2	0	—		—		2	0
Bytovia Bytów	2019–20	II liga	14	0	—		—		1 (Note: Appearance in I liga promotion/relegation play-offs)	0	15	0
Górnik Łęczna	2020–21	I liga	32	0	2	0	—		2 (Note: Appearances in I liga promotion play-offs)	0	36	0
Górnik Łęczna	2021–22	Ekstraklasa	32	0	2	0	—		—		34	0
Górnik Łęczna	2022–23	I liga	32	0	5	0	—		—		37	0
Górnik Łęczna	2023–24	I liga	33	0	0	0	—		1	0	34	0
Górnik Łęczna	Total		129	0	9	0	—		3	0	141	0
Wisła Płock	2024–25	I liga	17	0	0	0	—		0	0	17	0
Wisła Płock	2025–26	Ekstraklasa	0	0	0	0	—		—		0	0
Wisła Płock	Total		17	0	0	0	—		0	0	17	0
Wisła Płock II	2025–26	III liga, group I	1	0	—		—		—		1	0
Stal Mielec	2025–26	I liga	14	0	—		—		—		14	0
Career total			353	0	22	0	1	0	8	0	384	0

== Honours ==
Lech Poznań

- Ekstraklasa: 2014–15
- Polish Super Cup: 2015

Individual

- I liga Player of the Month: September 2023
- Polish Union of Footballers' I liga Team of the Season: 2023–24
