= Marcin Kamiński =

Polish footballer (born 1992)

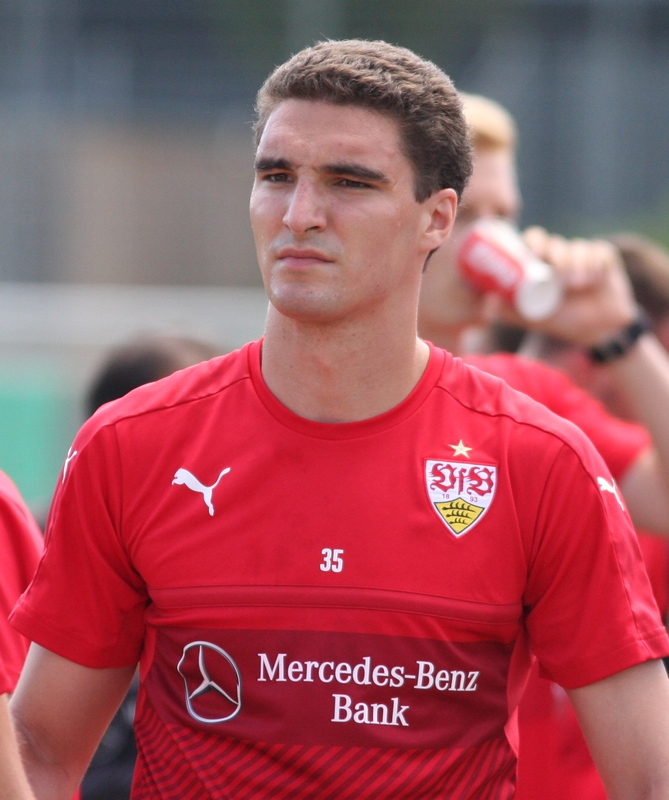
- Kaminski training with VfB Stuttgart in 2016

Personal information
- Date of birth: 15 January 1992 (age 34)
- Place of birth: Konin, Poland
- Height: 1.92 m (6 ft 4 in)
- Position: Centre-back

Team information
- Current team: Wisła Płock
- Number: 35

Youth career
- 2001–2005: Aluminium Konin
- 2005–2009: Lech Poznań

Senior career*
Years	Team	Apps	(Gls)
2009–2016	Lech Poznań	158	(8)
2016–2021	VfB Stuttgart	60	(1)
2016	VfB Stuttgart II	3	(0)
2018–2019	→ Fortuna Düsseldorf (loan)	27	(0)
2021–2025	Schalke 04	96	(7)
2025–	Wisła Płock	34	(3)

International career
2009–2011	Poland U19	16	(0)
2011–2012	Poland U20	7	(0)
2012–2014	Poland U21	14	(0)
2011–2018	Poland	7	(0)
- * Club domestic league appearances and goals as of 18:06, 29 May 2026 (UTC)

Marcin Kamiński (born 15 January 1992) is a Polish professional footballer who plays as a centre-back for Ekstraklasa club Wisła Płock.

== Club career ==
=== Lech Poznań ===
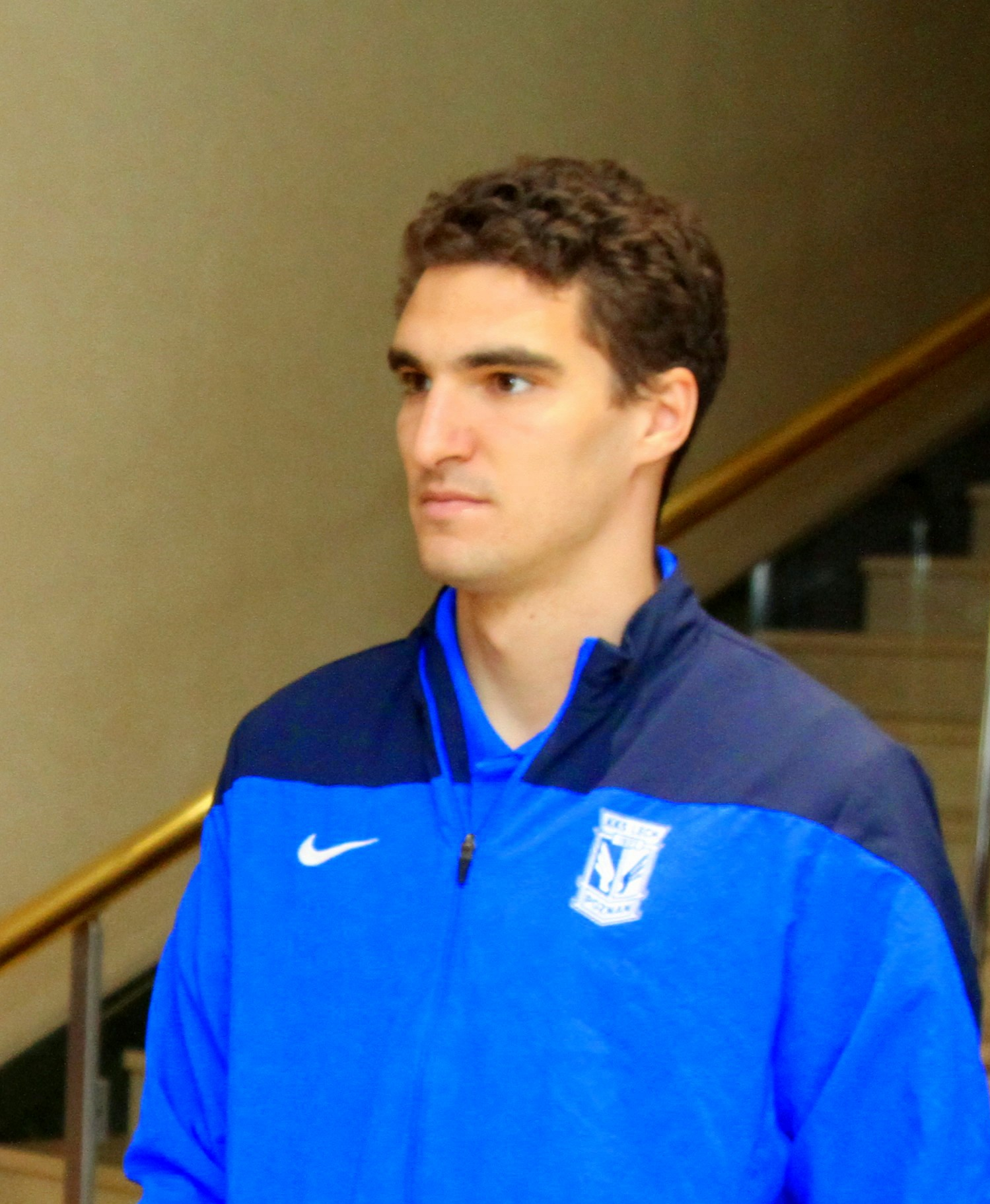
Kamiński with Lech Poznań in 2015

Kamiński made his professional debut for Lech Poznań in the Ekstraklasa on 21 November 2009, coming on as a substitute in the 90th minute for Jakub Wilk in a 3–1 home win against Ruch Chorzów. He played a total of over 200 matches for the club and won two championships (2009–10 and 2014–15).

=== Germany ===
For the 2016–17 Bundesliga, Kamiński moved to VfB Stuttgart. On 5 March 2018, he extended his contract with Stuttgart until June 2021. On 24 August 2018, Kamiński was loaned out to Fortuna Düsseldorf until the end of the season.

On 27 May 2021, Schalke 04 announced that Kamiński signed on a free transfer for the 2021–22 Bundesliga.

=== Wisła Płock ===
On 2 July 2025, Kamiński moved back to Poland to Ekstraklasa club Wisła Płock.

== International career ==
Kamiński debuted for the Polish senior squad in a friendly match against Bosnia and Herzegovina on 16 December 2011. In May 2018, he was named in Poland's preliminary 35-man squad for the 2018 FIFA World Cup.

== Career statistics ==
=== Club ===
As of match played 23 May 2026

Appearances and goals by club, season and competition
Club	Season	League			National cup (Note: Includes Polish Cup, DFB-Pokal)		Europe		Other		Total	
Club	Season	Division	Apps	Goals	Apps	Goals	Apps	Goals	Apps	Goals	Apps	Goals
Lech Poznań	2009–10	Ekstraklasa	4	0	1	0	0	0	—		5	0
Lech Poznań	2010–11	Ekstraklasa	0	0	3	0	1 (Note: Appearance(s) in UEFA Europa League)	0	1 (Note: Appearance in Polish Super Cup)	0	5	0
Lech Poznań	2011–12	Ekstraklasa	28	0	4	0	—		—		32	0
Lech Poznań	2012–13	Ekstraklasa	23	3	1	0	5	0	—		29	3
Lech Poznań	2013–14	Ekstraklasa	32	2	2	0	4	1	—		38	3
Lech Poznań	2014–15	Ekstraklasa	36	2	6	0	3	0	—		45	2
Lech Poznań	2015–16	Ekstraklasa	35	1	7	0	11 (Note: Four appearances in UEFA Champions League, seven appearances in UEFA Europa League)	0	1	1	54	2
Lech Poznań	Total		158	8	24	0	24	1	2	1	208	10
VfB Stuttgart	2016–17	2. Bundesliga	23	1	0	0	—		—		23	1
VfB Stuttgart	2017–18	Bundesliga	23	0	2	0	—		—		25	0
VfB Stuttgart	2019–20	2. Bundesliga	9	0	0	0	—		—		9	0
VfB Stuttgart	2020–21	Bundesliga	5	0	1	0	—		—		6	0
VfB Stuttgart	Total		60	1	3	0	—		—		63	1
Fortuna Düsseldorf (loan)	2018–19	Bundesliga	27	0	0	0	—		—		27	0
Schalke 04	2021–22	2. Bundesliga	31	2	2	0	—		—		33	2
Schalke 04	2022–23	Bundesliga	8	2	1	1	—		—		9	3
Schalke 04	2023–24	2. Bundesliga	30	2	2	1	—		—		32	3
Schalke 04	2024–25	2. Bundesliga	27	1	1	0	—		—		28	1
Schalke 04	Total		96	7	6	2	—		—		102	9
Wisła Płock	2025–26	Ekstraklasa	34	3	1	0	—		—		35	3
Career total			375	19	34	2	24	1	2	1	435	23

=== International ===
Appearances and goals by national team and year
National team	Year	Apps	Goals
Poland	2011	1	0
Poland	2012	2	0
Poland	2013	1	0
Poland	2018	3	0
Total		7	0

== Honours ==
Lech Poznań

- Ekstraklasa: 2009–10, 2014–15
- Polish Super Cup: 2015

VfB Stuttgart

- 2. Bundesliga: 2016–17

Schalke 04

- 2. Bundesliga: 2021–22
