= Darko Jevtić =

Swiss footballer (born 1993)

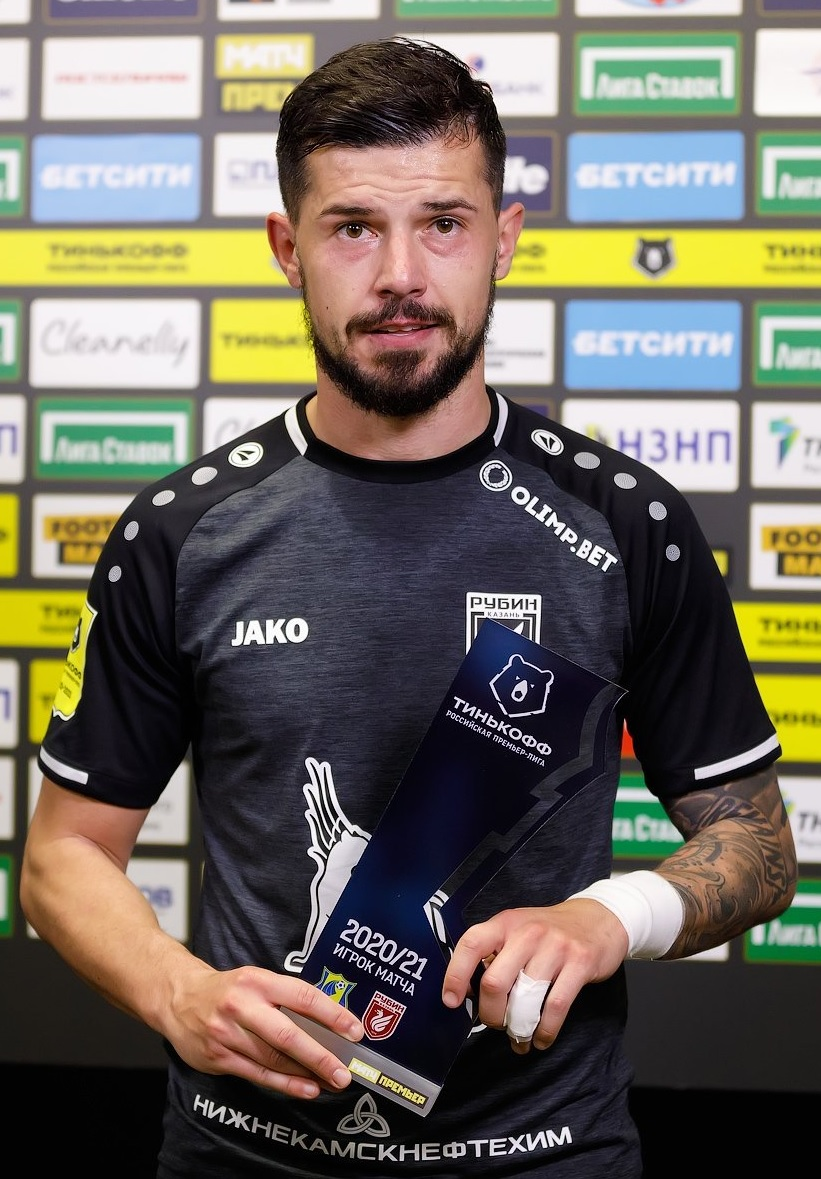
- Jevtić with Rubin Kazan in 2021

Personal information
- Date of birth: 8 February 1993 (age 33)
- Place of birth: Basel, Switzerland
- Height: 1.82 m (6 ft 0 in)
- Position: Midfielder

Youth career
- 2001–2005: Basel
- 2006: Concordia Basel
- 2006–2011: Basel

Senior career*
Years	Team	Apps	(Gls)
2011–2012	Basel U21	14	(1)
2012–2014	Basel	2	(0)
2013–2014	→ Wacker Innsbruck (loan)	19	(3)
2014–2015	→ Lech Poznań (loan)	18	(4)
2015–2020	Lech Poznań	137	(29)
2015–2019	Lech Poznań II	3	(3)
2020–2024	Rubin Kazan	43	(4)
2021–2022	→ AEK Athens (loan)	16	(0)
2021	→ AEK Athens B (loan)	1	(0)
2024–2025	Jedinstvo Ub	6	(1)
Total		259	(45)

International career
2008–2009	Switzerland U16	8	(1)
2009–2010	Switzerland U17	7	(1)
2010	Switzerland U18	4	(1)
2011	Switzerland U19	7	(2)
2012	Switzerland U20	3	(0)
2013–2014	Switzerland U21	10	(5)
- * Club domestic league appearances and goals

Darko Jevtić (Serbian Cyrillic: Дарко Јевтић; born 8 February 1993) is a Swiss former professional footballer who played as an attacking midfielder.

== Club career ==
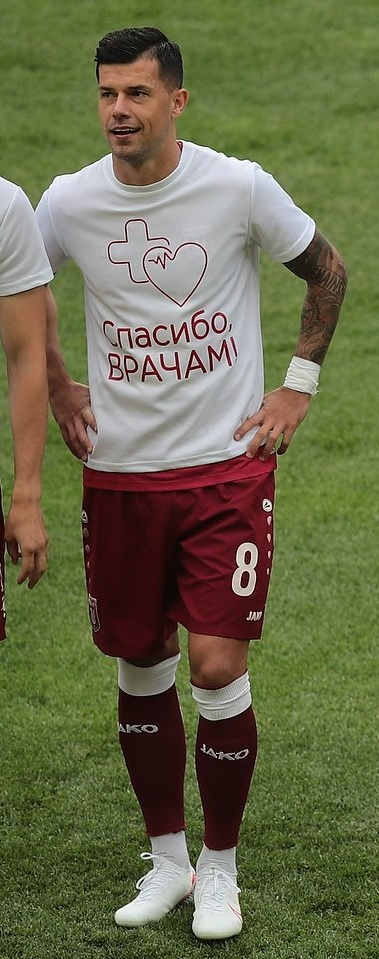
Jevtić as a player of Rubin Kazan in 2020

=== Basel ===
Jevtić started his youth football with Basel. In 2015 he moved across town played for nearly a year in the Concordia Basel youth team but returned to Basel in August 2006. He played in their U-16 team and was part of the team that won the Swiss Championship in 2008 and 2009. Later he played in the U-18 team, the U-19 team in the 2011–12 NextGen series and the U-21 team before he signed his first professional contract and joined their first team in January 2012.

He joined Basel's first team during the winter break of their 2011–12 season under head coach Heiko Vogel. After having appeared in four test games, Jevtić played his domestic league debut for the club, being substituted in, during the away game in the Letzigrund on 28 July 2012 as Basel played a 2–2 draw with Grasshopper Club He had a starting eleven appearances in the Swiss Cup match on 15 September 2012 away against amateur club FC Amriswil and in the last league match of the season at home game in the St. Jakob-Park he played the full 90 minutes as Basel won 1–0 against St. Gallen.

At the end of the Swiss Super League season 2012–13 he won the Championship title with the team. In the 2012–13 Swiss Cup Basel reached the final, but were runners up behind Grasshopper Club, being defeated 4–3 on penalties, following a 1–1 draw after extra time. In the 2012–13 UEFA Europa League Basel advanced as far as the semi-finals, there being matched against the reigning UEFA Champions League holders Chelsea, but they were knocked out, losing both home and away ties, beaten 2–5 on aggregate.

In the next season, after appearing in six test games, Jevtić was in the starting formation in the cup game on 17 August 2013 as Basel won 1–0 against local amateur club BSC Old Boys.

During his short period with Basel's first team, Jevtić played a total of 15 games for them scoring a total of three goals. Two of these games were in the Swiss Super League, two in the Swiss Cup and 11 were friendly games. He scored all three of his goals during the test games.

==== Wacker Innsbruck (loan) ====
On 2 September 2013, Basel announced that Jevtić had joined the Austrian club Wacker Innsbruck on a one-year loan.

==== Lech Poznań (loan) ====
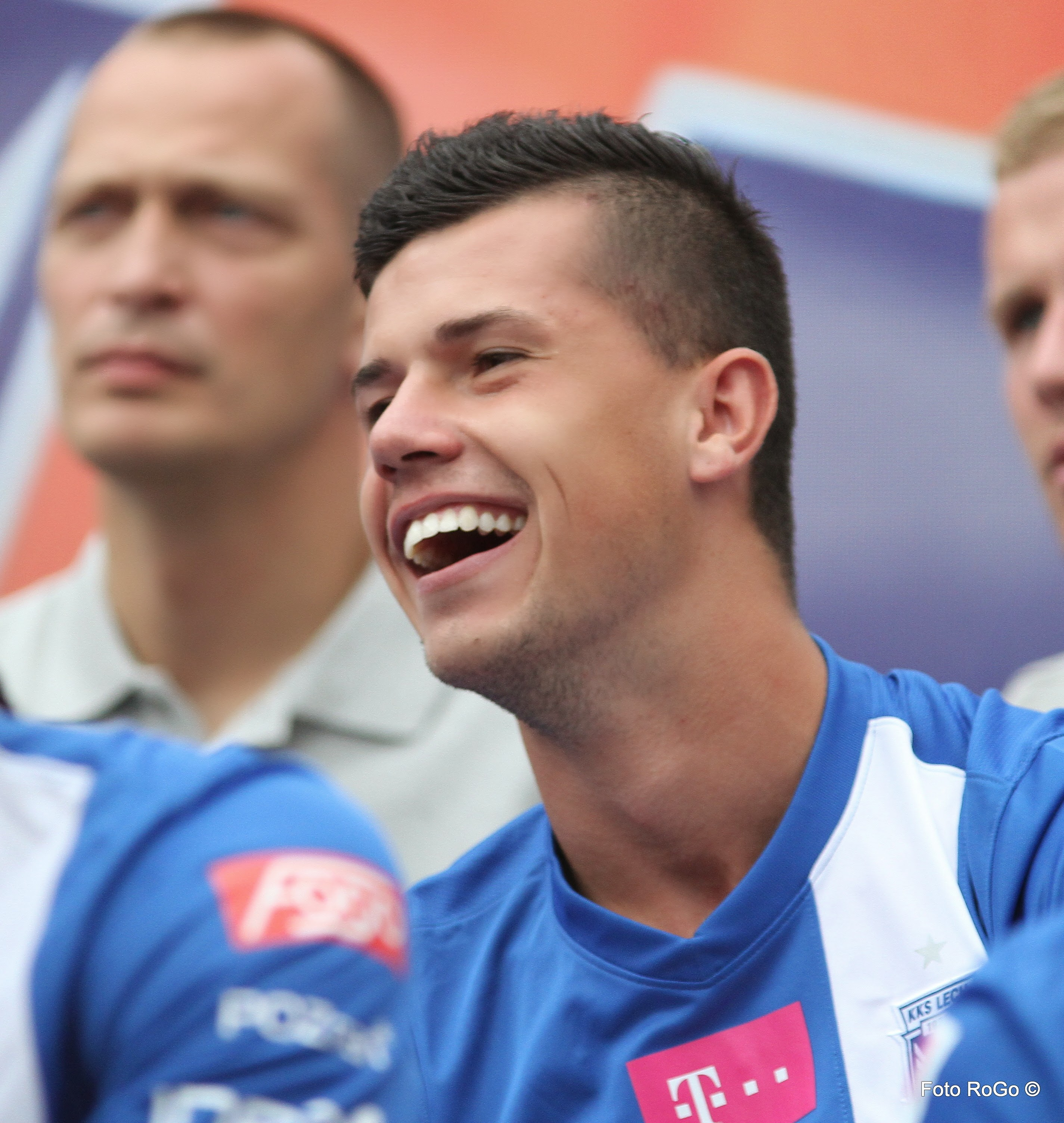
Jevtić as a player of Lech Poznań in 2014

On 11 June 2014, Jevtić was loaned to Polish Ekstraklasa club Lech Poznań. The contract contained the option of a definite purchase and on 25 January 2015, Lech Poznan exercised the option to sign Jevtić ona three-and-a-half-year contract.

=== Lech Poznań ===
The Swiss midfielder soon became a key player for the team and stayed with them for six years.

Jevtić faced his previous club Basel in the 2015–16 UEFA Champions League qualifying phase, in the third qualifying round. The first leg was held on 29 July 2015 at the INEA Stadion in Poznań, but Jevtić did not make an appearance in a 1–3 loss. The second leg was played at the St. Jakob-Park on 5 August, with Jevtić was in the starting eleven Lech suffered a 1–0 defeat. Lech continued in the Europa League play-off round and with a 4–0 aggregate win against Videoton, they qualified for the 2015–16 UEFA Europa League group stage. Lech and Basel faced each other yet again, after being drawn together in the same group. The first direct match, on 1 October, was a home match for Basel. Jevtić played in the starting eleven, with Basel winning 2–0. The return match was played in Poznań on 10 December and Jevtić again played in the starting team, with Basel recording yet another 0–1 victory. Ending the group in first position, Basel qualified for the knockout phase, while Lech crashed out of the competition after finishing in third place.

Jevtić gathered excellent figures during his stay in Poland, scoring 33 goals and recording 32 assists in 155 league matches.

=== Rubin Kazan ===
On 22 January 2020, Jevtić signed a four-and-a-half-year contract with Russian club Rubin Kazan. During his first stint at Rubin, he made 41 appearances, scored four goals and made four assists.

==== AEK Athens (loan) ====
On 31 August 2021, Jevtić moved on a one-year loan to Greek club AEK Athens. Brought in to compete for a spot in the starting line-up with captain Petros Mantalos, Jevtić was unable to establish himself as a starter.

==== Return to Rubin ====
Upon his return from loan in the summer of 2022, Jevtić suffered an ACL tear. The recovery took an extended time; he made his first appearance on the field in two years in April 2024. Jevtić left Rubin on 31 May 2024, as his contract expired.

=== Jedinstvo Ub and retirement ===
In July 2024, Jevtić joined Serbian SuperLiga side Jedinstvo Ub. After making seven appearances and scoring once, he left the club in January 2025. On 3 November 2025, Jevtić announced his retirement from professional football via Instagram.

== International career ==
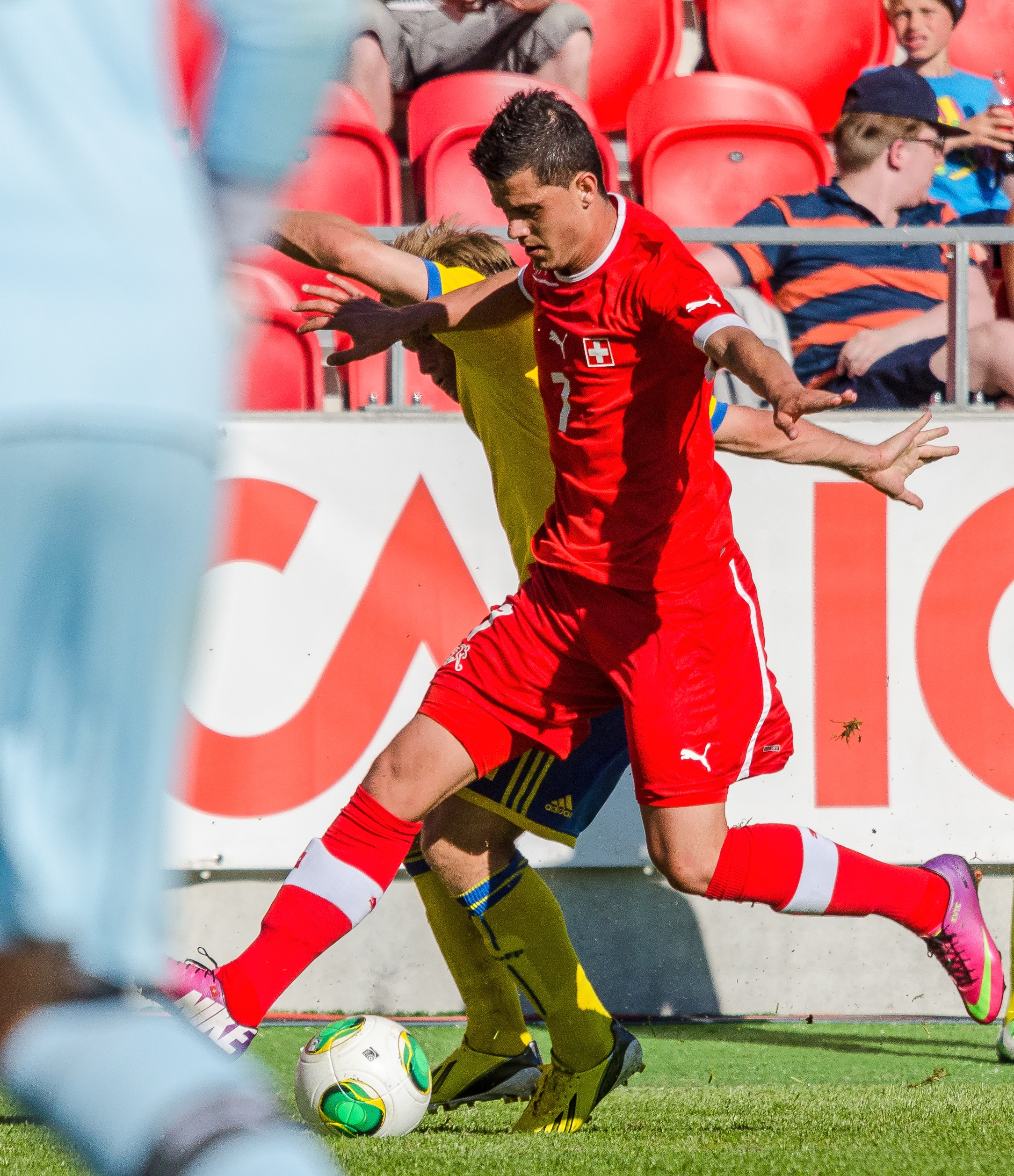
Jevtić in action for Switzerland under-21 team in 2013

On 6 June 2013, Jevtić made his debut for the Switzerland under-21 team as left winger in the 2–3 away defeat against Sweden. During his third appearance for the team on 5 September 2013, in the Group 5 qualification game to the 2015 UEFA European Under-21 Football Championships, he scored his first goal for them in the 2–0 away win against Latvia in Slokas Stadium, Jūrmala.

== Career statistics ==
Appearances and goals by club, season and competition
Club	Season	League			National cup (Note: Includes Swiss Cup, Austrian Cup, Polish Cup, Russian Cup, Greek Cup, Serbian Cup)		Europe		Other		Total	
Club	Season	Division	Apps	Goals	Apps	Goals	Apps	Goals	Apps	Goals	Apps	Goals
Basel	2012–13	Swiss Super League	2	0	1	0	—		—		3	0
Basel	2013–14	Swiss Super League	0	0	1	0	—		—		1	0
Basel	Total		2	0	2	0	—		—		4	0
Wacker Innsbruck (loan)	2013–14	Austrian Bundesliga	19	3	1	0	—		—		20	3
Wacker Innsbruck (loan)	Total		19	3	1	0	—		—		20	3
Lech Poznań	2014–15	Ekstraklasa	29	7	4	0	4 (Note: Appearances in UEFA Europa League)	0	—		37	7
Lech Poznań	2015–16	Ekstraklasa	26	4	5	0	5 (Note: Three appearances in UEFA Champions League, two appearances in UEFA Europa League)	0	1 (Note: Appearance in Polish Super Cup)	0	37	4
Lech Poznań	2016–17	Ekstraklasa	31	8	7	1	—		0	0	38	9
Lech Poznań	2017–18	Ekstraklasa	24	5	0	0	4	3	—		28	8
Lech Poznań	2018–19	Ekstraklasa	26	3	0	0	6	0	—		32	3
Lech Poznań	2019–20	Ekstraklasa	19	6	1	0	—		—		20	6
Lech Poznań	Total		155	33	17	1	19	3	1	0	192	37
Lech Poznań II	2014–15	III liga, group C	1	2	—		—		—		1	2
Lech Poznań II	2015–16	III liga, group C	1	1	—		—		—		1	1
Lech Poznań II	2019–20	II liga	1	0	—		—		—		1	0
Lech Poznań II	Total		3	3	—		—		—		3	3
Rubin Kazan	2019–20	Russian Premier League	10	0	0	0	—		—		10	0
Rubin Kazan	2020–21	Russian Premier League	25	3	2	0	—		—		27	3
Rubin Kazan	2021–22	Russian Premier League	6	1	0	0	2 (Note: Appearances in UEFA Europa Conference League)	0	—		8	1
Rubin Kazan	2023–24	Russian Premier League	2	0	0	0	—		—		2	0
Rubin Kazan	Total		43	4	2	0	2	0	0	0	47	4
AEK Athens (loan)	2021–22	Superleague Greece	16	0	3	0	—		—		19	0
AEK Athens B (loan)	2021–22	Superleague Greece 2	1	0	0	0	—		—		1	0
Jedinstvo Ub	2024–25	Serbian SuperLiga	6	1	1	0	—		—		7	1
Career total			245	44	26	1	21	3	1	0	293	48

== Honours ==
Basel U16

- Swiss Champion: 2007–08, 2008–09

Basel

- Swiss Super League: 2012–13
- Swiss Cup runner-up: 2012–13

Lech Poznań

- Ekstraklasa: 2014–15
- Polish Super Cup: 2015

== Sources ==
- Die ersten 125 Jahre. Publisher: Josef Zindel im Friedrich Reinhardt Verlag, Basel. ISBN 978-3-7245-2305-5
- Verein "Basler Fussballarchiv" Homepage
