= Barry Douglas =

Scottish footballer (born 1989)

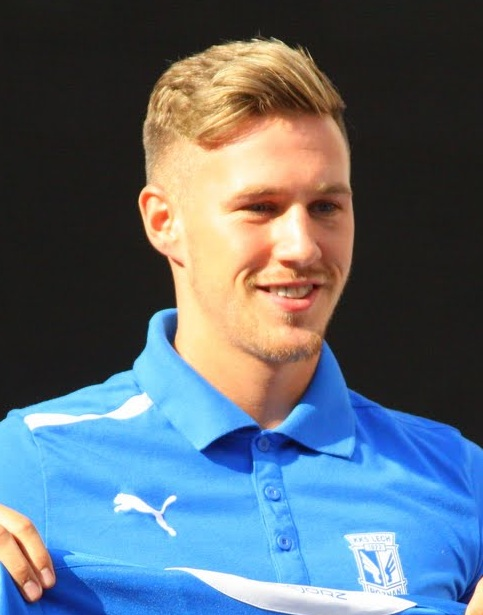
- Douglas with Lech Poznań in 2013

Personal information
- Full name: Barry James Douglas
- Date of birth: 4 September 1989 (age 37)
- Place of birth: Glasgow, Scotland
- Height: 5 ft 9 in (1.76 m)
- Positions: Left-back; left wing-back

Youth career
- –2006: Livingston
- 2007–2008: Queen's Park

Senior career*
Years	Team	Apps	(Gls)
2008–2010	Queen's Park	65	(10)
2010–2013	Dundee United	60	(4)
2013–2016	Lech Poznań	58	(3)
2014–2015	Lech Poznań II	1	(0)
2016–2017	Konyaspor	34	(0)
2017–2018	Wolverhampton Wanderers	39	(5)
2018–2021	Leeds United	42	(0)
2020–2021	→ Blackburn Rovers (loan)	30	(0)
2021–2024	Lech Poznań	46	(1)
2022–2023	Lech Poznań II	2	(0)
2024–2025	St Johnstone	16	(0)
Total		393	(23)

International career
2018	Scotland	1	(0)
- * Club domestic league appearances and goals

Barry James Douglas (born 4 September 1989) is a Scottish former professional footballer who played as a left-back.

After playing for Queen's Park and Dundee United in Scotland, in 2013 he joined Polish club Lech Poznań, with whom he won the 2014–15 Ekstraklasa title. He signed for Konyaspor in Turkey in 2016, after which he joined Wolverhampton Wanderers in 2017. Douglas enjoyed a successful season with Wolves, winning the 2017–18 EFL Championship and making his full international debut. In July 2018, he joined Leeds United, with whom he won the 2019–20 EFL Championship under manager Marcelo Bielsa. After a year spent on loan at Blackburn Rovers, he rejoined Lech Poznań in 2021, and won his second Ekstraklasa title in his first season back. In July 2024, he returned to Scotland to sign with St Johnstone. He retired from professional football in April 2026.

== Club career ==
=== Queens Park ===
Douglas was born in Glasgow and raised in the city's Pollok district.Douglas was educated at Mosspark Primary School and Rosshall Academy where he met future Dundee United teammate Scott Allan He played for Livingston's youth teams, but was released at the age of sixteen because he was considered "too small". He then spent a year out of football before joining Queen's Park, becoming part of their first team squad in 2008. He made his senior debut in August 2008 in a Scottish Second Division match against Stranraer, and went on to become a first team regular for Queen's Park, playing for the amateur club part-time while also working as a refrigeration engineer and serving an apprenticeship in the trade. His performances saw him linked with a number of professional clubs, despite Queen's Park being relegated to the Third Division in 2009. Douglas continued to impress at the lower level, scoring nine goals from his full-back position during the 2009–10 season. He finished the season as Queen's Park's top scorer.

=== Dundee United ===
On 20 June 2010, he signed professionally with Scottish Premier League club Dundee United. His debut for his new club came in August of that year, as a substitute against Inverness Caledonian Thistle in the SPL. He spent three seasons at Tannadice; the player signed by United to replace him in the position, Andrew Robertson, also moved from Queen's Park, leading to disputes between the clubs as Dundee United had used the amateur status of Queen's Park and Douglas to avoid paying a transfer fee, and attempted to do the same with Robertson.

=== Lech Poznań ===
On 28 May 2013, Douglas signed a two-year deal with Polish club Lech Poznań. He made his debut against Widzew Łódź in a 1–0 win on 29 September 2013. His first goal for the club came on 3 August 2014, from a freekick in a 3–2 defeat against Wisła Kraków. He scored a freekick on 6 March 2015 against Jagiellonia Białystok in a 2–0 victory, before scoring another on 22 March in a 2–1 win over Wisła Kraków.

He played 27 times as Lech won the Polish league championship in 2014–15, and the subsequent Super Cup. He scored from another freekick for Poznań in the UEFA Champions League qualification phase against FK Sarajevo on 22 July 2015. He made 75 appearances in all competitions for the club, scoring 5 goals.

=== Konyaspor ===
Douglas signed for Turkish Süper Lig team Konyaspor in January 2016. He played his first league match against Galatasaray on 6 February 2016. With Konyaspor, Douglas reached the 2016–17 Turkish Cup final and played the full game as they defeated İstanbul Başakşehir on penalties. He played 45 times in all competitions during his spell, including four games in the 2016–17 UEFA Europa League.

=== Wolverhampton Wanderers ===
On 1 July 2017, he was signed by manager Nuno Espírito Santo for English Championship club Wolverhampton Wanderers for an undisclosed fee on a two-year deal with a year's option in the club's favour. He made his debut for the club on 5 August 2017 in a 1–0 win against Middlesbrough at Molineux. He scored his first goal a week later, in a 2–0 win away against Derby County. On 22 November 2017, Douglas scored a long range freekick in a 4–1 win against Leeds United. He was nominated for the EFL Championship Player of The Month award for November 2017.

Douglas picked up a winner's medal during the 2017–18 EFL Championship with Wolves winning the league, contributing five goals and 14 assists from the left back position. His tally of assists also saw him finish joint-top (with Robert Snodgrass) of the relevant charts in the EFL Championship.

=== Leeds United ===
==== 2018–19 ====
On 28 July 2018, EFL Championship side Leeds United signed Douglas for an undisclosed fee (roughly £3 million) on a three-year contract. He was given the number 3 shirt for the season. He made his debut and got an assist in the opening game of the 2018–19 season on 5 August 2018 against Stoke City at Elland Road in a 3–1 win. Douglas had injury problems in the beginning of 2019, which resulted in him missing several games, which saw Gjanni Alioski slot into his left back position whilst out injured, and on 30 March, Douglas, in obvious distress, played through a ruptured knee ligament, as all three substitutes had been used, in a tightly fought 3–2 win over Millwall. The injury ruled the Scot out for the remainder of the season, including playoffs.

During an injury-hit 2018–19 season, Douglas played 27 games in all competitions, making 5 assists. Leeds finished the regular season in third place, dropping out of the automatic promotion places with three games left after a defeat to ten-man Wigan Athletic on 19 April. With Douglas' season already ended by injury, Leeds lost to Derby County in the playoff semi-finals.

==== 2019–20 ====
After three months out injured, Douglas returned from injury on 10 July in a pre-season friendly 5–0 win against York City. He started the season as Leeds' first choice left back, but after a series of injuries, he found himself out of the side behind Gjanni Alioski. After an impressive half time substitute appearance against West Bromwich Albion on 1 January 2020, head coach Marcelo Bielsa said Douglas would start against Premier League side Arsenal in the third round of the F.A. Cup. Douglas played the full 90 minutes of the cup tie, which Arsenal won 1–0 but was substituted for Alioski during Sheffield Wednesday's late win at Elland Road on 11 January.

After the English professional football season was paused in March 2020 due to Impact of the COVID-19 pandemic on association football, the season was resumed during June, where Douglas earned promotion with Leeds to the Premier League and also become the EFL Championship Champions for the 2019–20 season in July after the successful resumption of the season.

==== 2020–21 ====
His first start of the 2020–21 season came on 16 September 2020 for Premier League Leeds in a 1–1 draw against Hull City in the EFL Cup (Hull went on to win 9–8 on penalties).

Douglas was loaned to Championship club Blackburn Rovers on 16 October 2020 until the end of the 2020–21 season.

In May 2021, he was released by Leeds at the expiry of his contract.

=== Return to Lech Poznań ===
On 2 July 2021, Douglas returned to Poland, signing a two-year contract with Lech Poznań. In his first season back at the club, Douglas made 15 Ekstraklasa appearances and won his second Polish league title. In May 2023, he extended his deal for another twelve months. A year later, it was announced Douglas would leave the club upon the expiration of his contract.

=== St Johnstone ===
On 21 October 2024, Douglas returned to Scotland, joining St Johnstone on a contract until the end of the season.

=== Retirement ===
On 7 April 2026, after spending several months without a club, Douglas announced his retirement from professional football.

== International career ==
Douglas was selected for the Scotland national team in March 2018. He made sole international appearance on 27 March, coming on as a substitute for Andrew Robertson in a 1–0 win against Hungary.

== Style of play ==
Douglas played either as a left back or a left wing-back. He was also known for his free-kick and set piece ability.

== Take Us Home ==
In August 2019, Douglas was one of the main stars of Leeds United documentary Take Us Home on Amazon Prime, featuring in several episodes. The documentary was narrated by Russell Crowe.

== Career statistics ==
=== Club ===
Appearances and goals by club, season and competition
Club	Season	League			National cup (Note: Includes Scottish Cup, Polish Cup, Turkish Cup, FA Cup)		League cup (Note: Includes Scottish League Cup, EFL Cup)		Europe		Other		Total	
Club	Season	Division	Apps	Goals	Apps	Goals	Apps	Goals	Apps	Goals	Apps	Goals	Apps	Goals
Queen's Park	2008–09	Scottish Second Division	30	2	3	0	1	0	—		2 (Note: Appearances in the Second Division play-offs)	0	36	2
Queen's Park	2009–10	Scottish Third Division	35	8	0	0	1	1	—		3 (Note: Two appearances in the Second Division play-offs, one appearance in Scottish Challenge Cup)	0	39	9
Queen's Park	Total		65	10	3	0	2	1	—		5	0	75	11
Dundee United	2010–11	Scottish Premier League	23	2	4	0	1	0	0	0	—		28	2
Dundee United	2011–12	Scottish Premier League	9	1	1	0	2	0	1 (Note: Appearances in UEFA Europa League)	0	—		13	1
Dundee United	2012–13	Scottish Premier League	28	1	4	0	0	0	2	0	—		34	1
Dundee United	Total		60	4	9	0	3	0	3	0	—		75	4
Lech Poznań	2013–14	Ekstraklasa	18	0	1	0	—		—		—		19	0
Lech Poznań	2014–15	Ekstraklasa	27	3	5	1	—		1	0	—		33	4
Lech Poznań	2015–16	Ekstraklasa	13	0	2	0	—		7 (Note: Four appearances in UEFA Champions League, three appearances in UEFA Europa League)	1	1 (Note: Appearance in Polish Super Cup)	0	23	1
Lech Poznań	Total		58	3	8	1	—		8	1	1	0	75	5
Lech Poznań II	2014–15	III liga, group C	1	0	—		—		—		—		1	0
Konyaspor	2015–16	Süper Lig	12	0	2	0	—		—		—		14	0
Konyaspor	2016–17	Süper Lig	22	0	5	0	—		4	0	—		31	0
Konyaspor	Total		34	0	7	0	—		4	0	—		45	0
Wolverhampton Wanderers	2017–18	Championship	39	5	2	0	1	0	—		0	0	42	5
Leeds United	2018–19	Championship	27	0	0	0	0	0	—		0	0	27	0
Leeds United	2019–20	Championship	15	0	1	0	1	0	—		0	0	17	0
Leeds United	2020–21	Premier League	0	0	0	0	1	0	—		0	0	1	0
Leeds United	Total		42	0	1	0	2	0	—		0	0	45	0
Blackburn Rovers (loan)	2020–21	Championship	30	0	1	0	0	0	—		0	0	31	0
Lech Poznań	2021–22	Ekstraklasa	15	1	4	3	—		—		—		19	4
Lech Poznań	2022–23	Ekstraklasa	16	0	0	0	—		8 (Note: One appearance in UEFA Champions League, seven appearances in UEFA Europa Conference League)	0	1	0	25	0
Lech Poznań	2023–24	Ekstraklasa	15	0	3	0	—		2 (Note: Appearances in UEFA Europa Conference League)	0	—		20	0
Lech Poznań	Total		46	1	7	3	—		10	0	1	0	64	4
Lech Poznań II	2022–23	II liga	2	0	—		—		—		—		2	0
St Johnstone	2024–25	Scottish Premier League	16	0	3	0	—		—		—		19	0
Career total			393	23	41	4	8	1	25	1	7	0	474	29

=== International ===
Appearances and goals by national team and year
National team	Year	Apps	Goals
Scotland	2018	1	0
Total		1	0

== Honours ==
Lech Poznań

- Ekstraklasa: 2014–15, 2021–22
- Polish Super Cup: 2015

Konyaspor

- Turkish Cup: 2016–17

Wolverhampton Wanderers

- EFL Championship: 2017–18

Leeds United

- EFL Championship: 2019–20
