= Piotr Kurbiel =

Polish footballer

Personal information
- Date of birth: 7 February 1996 (age 30)
- Place of birth: Radom, Poland
- Height: 1.87 m (6 ft 2 in)
- Position: Striker

Team information
- Current team: Wikęd Luzino
- Number: 19

Youth career
- Junior Radom
- 2007–2009: Legion Radom
- 2009–2012: Delta Warsaw
- 2012: PKS Radość
- 2012–2013: Lech Poznań

Senior career*
Years	Team	Apps	(Gls)
2013–2016	Lech Poznań II	65	(32)
2015–2018	Lech Poznań	3	(0)
2016–2017	→ Pogoń Siedlce (loan)	20	(1)
2017–2018	→ Olimpia Elbląg (loan)	33	(6)
2018–2020	Błękitni Stargard	45	(11)
2020–2021	GKS Katowice	36	(3)
2021–2022	Olimpia Elbląg	31	(3)
2022–2024	Stomil Olsztyn	69	(16)
2024–	Wikęd Luzino	62	(21)
- * Club domestic league appearances and goals as of 17:50, 5 June 2026 (UTC)

Piotr Kurbiel (born 7 February 1996) is a Polish professional footballer who plays as a striker for III liga club Wikęd Luzino.

== Club career ==
On 6 January 2020, he signed a one-and-a-half-year contract with GKS Katowice.

== Career statistics ==
As of match played 3 June 2026

Appearances and goals by club, season and competition
Club	Season	League			Polish Cup		Europe		Total	
Club	Season	Division	Apps	Goals	Apps	Goals	Apps	Goals	Apps	Goals
Lech Poznań II	2013–14	III liga, gr. C	13	4	—		—		13	4
Lech Poznań II	2014–15	III liga, gr. C	23	13	—		—		23	13
Lech Poznań II	2015–16	III liga, gr. C	26	15	—		—		26	15
Lech Poznań II	Total		65	32	—		—		65	32
Lech Poznań	2015–16	Ekstraklasa	3	0	0	0	1 (Note: Appearance in UEFA Europa League)	0	4	0
Pogoń Siedlce (loan)	2016–17	I liga	20	1	1	0	—		21	1
Olimpia Elbląg (loan)	2017–18	II liga	33	6	1	0	—		34	6
Błękitni Stargard	2018–19	II liga	26	4	1	0	—		27	4
Błękitni Stargard	2019–20	II liga	19	7	3	2	—		22	9
Błękitni Stargard	Total		45	11	4	2	—		49	13
GKS Katowice	2019–20	II liga	13	2	—		—		13	2
GKS Katowice	2020–21	II liga	23	1	0	0	—		23	1
GKS Katowice	Total		36	3	0	0	—		36	3
Olimpia Elbląg	2021–22	II liga	31	3	1	1	—		32	4
Stomil Olsztyn	2022–23	II liga	36	10	1	0	—		37	10
Stomil Olsztyn	2023–24	II liga	33	6	0	0	—		33	6
Stomil Olsztyn	Total		69	16	1	0	—		70	16
Wikęd Luzino	2024–25	IV liga Pomerania	34	8	—		—		34	8
Wikęd Luzino	2025–26	III liga, group II	28	13	—		—		28	13
Wikęd Luzino	Total		62	21	—		—		62	21
Career total			364	93	8	3	—		372	96

== Honours ==
Wikęd Luzino

- IV liga Pomerania: 2024–25
