= Aleksandar Atanacković =

Aleksandar Atanacković may refer to:

- Aleksandar Atanacković (footballer born 1920) (1920–2005), Serbian footballer
- Aleksandar Atanacković (footballer born 1980), Serbian footballer
