= Maciej Skorża =

Polish football manager (born 1972)

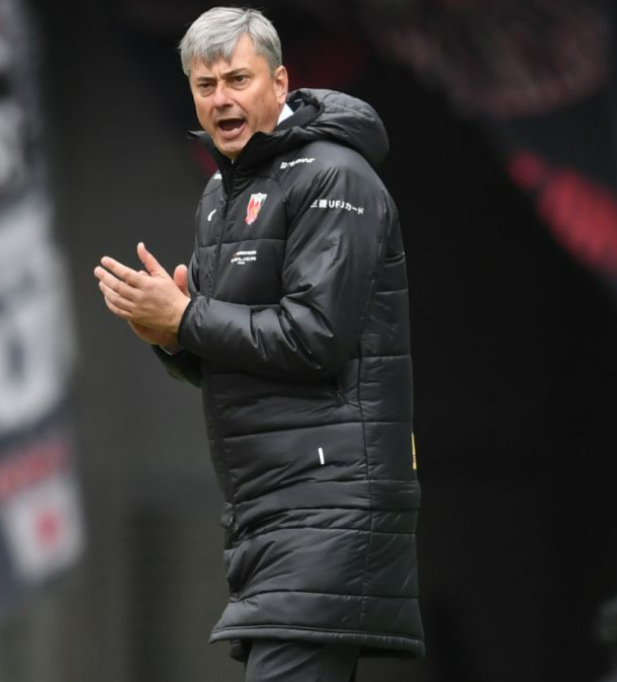
- Skorża managing Urawa Red Diamonds in 2023

Personal information
- Full name: Maciej Skorża
- Date of birth: 10 January 1972 (age 54)
- Place of birth: Radom, Poland
- Position: Defender

Senior career*
Years	Team	Apps	(Gls)
1993	Radomiak Radom		
1994	AZS-AWF Warsaw		

Managerial career
- 1994–1998: Legia Warsaw (youth)
- 1997–1999: Poland U21 (assistant)
- 1998–1999: SMS Piaseczno
- 1999–2002: Amica Wronki (youth)
- 2002–2003: Amica Wronki II
- 2003: Wisła Płock (assistant)
- 2003–2006: Poland (assistant)
- 2004–2005: Amica Wronki
- 2006–2007: Dyskobolia
- 2007–2010: Wisła Kraków
- 2010–2012: Legia Warsaw
- 2012–2013: Ettifaq
- 2014–2015: Lech Poznań
- 2017: Pogoń Szczecin
- 2018–2020: United Arab Emirates U23
- 2021–2022: Lech Poznań
- 2023: Urawa Red Diamonds
- 2024–2026: Urawa Red Diamonds
- * Club domestic league appearances and goals

Maciej Skorża (Polish pronunciation: [ˈmat͡ɕɛj ˈskɔrʐa]; born 10 January 1972) is a Polish professional football manager and former player who was most recently the manager of J1 League club Urawa Red Diamonds.

During his coaching career, he has won four Ekstraklasa championships, three Polish Cups and one Polish Super Cup, making him the most decorated manager in Poland's domestic football history. He won his first continental silverware in 2022 after winning the AFC Champions League with Japanese side Urawa Red Diamonds.

== Club career ==
He was playing as a defender for Radomiak Radom and AZS-AWF Warsaw.

== Managerial career ==
=== Early career ===
In 1994, he began his coaching career as a youth coach for Legia Warsaw. He managed SMS Piaseczno during the 1998–99 season. From 1999 to 2003, he coached the Amica Wronki youth team and was successful in winning a league title in 2002. He also was an assistant to Mirosław Jabłoński while at Wisła Płock.

In May 2003, Paweł Janas appointed Skorża as an assistant coach for the Poland national football team. However, following Poland's elimination from the 2006 FIFA World Cup group stage, the entire staff, including Skorża, was sacked by the Polish Football Association.

He had a short spell at Wisła Płock as an assistant manager before returning to Amica Wronki as a manager in 2004. In the 2004–05 season, Skorża became the first Polish coach to manage to qualify a Polish football club to the group stage of the UEFA Cup. In the 2006–07 season, he joined Dyskobolia Grodzisk Wielkopolski where he won the Polish Cup, and left shortly before the Ekstraklasa Cup final.

=== Wisła Kraków ===
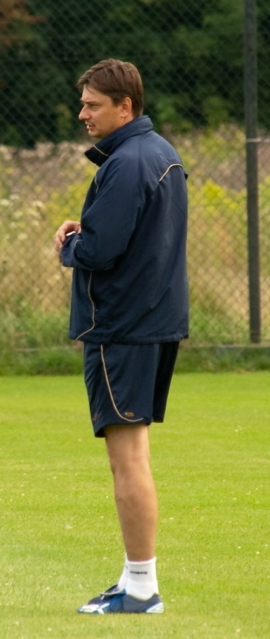
Skorża with Wisła Kraków in 2009

On 13 June 2007, Skorża was appointed as the manager of Wisła Kraków which he led twice to a league title, winning Ekstraklasa in the 2007–08 and 2008–09 seasons. In the 2008–09 UEFA Champions League third qualifying round, he managed to beat Pep Guardiola's Barcelona 1–0 in the second leg, but Wisła were knocked out as they lost 4–1 on aggregate. They later had to face Tottenham Hotspur in the UEFA Cup first round, where they lost 3–2 on aggregate. By the start of the next season, on 27 July 2009, he lost the Polish Super Cup against Lech Poznań 3–4 on penalties after a 1–1 draw.

He worked with Wisła Kraków until 15 March 2010, when the Wisła's board of directors fired him after a series of three games without a win, in spite of the club holding the lead of the league.

=== Legia Warsaw ===
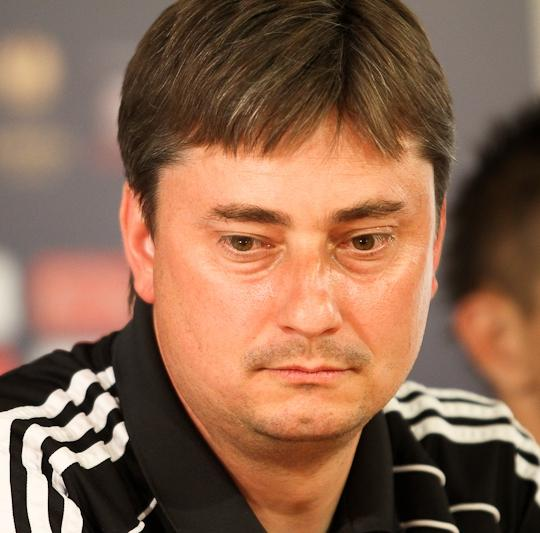
Skorża as manager of Legia Warsaw in 2011

On 1 June 2010, Skorża was announced as the new manager of Legia Warsaw. Under the lead of Skorża, Legia won the Polish Cup twice in a row in the 2010–2011 and 2011–2012 seasons. On 30 May 2012, Skorża's two-year spell as the Legia manager came to an end.

=== Ettifaq ===
On 26 September 2012, he became the head coach of the Saudi club Ettifaq. In October, he lost both AFC Cup semi-final matches against eventual winners Kuwait SC by 6–1 on aggregate. In the 2012–13 season, Ettifaq finished sixth in the league, were eliminated from both the Saudi Crown Prince Cup round of 16, the King Cup of Champions quarter-finals, as well as the 2013 AFC Champions League group stage. In June 2013, Ettifaq sacked him for disappointing results.

=== Lech Poznań ===
On 1 September 2014, Skorża began his tenure as manager of Lech Poznań, signing a three-year contract with the club. In his first season in charge, Lech Poznań won Polish Ekstraklasa with a 0–0 draw with Wisła Kraków. This was the third Polish title in his managerial career. This game was watched by 41,545 of fans from the stand, the highest attendance of the entire 2014–15 season in Poland. Lech started the next season with a Polish Super Cup 3–1 home win over Legia Warsaw. The game was attended by 40,088 fans, which is the record for the Super Cup's competition audience size. Lech qualified to the 2015–16 UEFA Europa League group stage, but struggled domestically, earning eight points from the first 11 games of the season. On 12 October 2015, Skorża was sacked.

=== Pogoń Szczecin ===
In May 2017, Skorża was announced as Kazimierz Moskal's successor at Ekstraklasa club Pogoń Szczecin. However, he was sacked on 30 October 2017 as the club was placed last in the league table.

=== United Arab Emirates U23 ===
From 19 March 2018 to 28 February 2020, Skorża coached the United Arab Emirates national under-23 team, which he led to win the bronze medal in the 2018 Asian Games, and reach the quarter-finals of the 2020 AFC U-23 Championship with only one win. He got sacked after being defeated 5–1 by Uzbekistan national under-23 team at the 2020 AFC U-23 Championship.

=== Return to Lech Poznań ===
On 10 April 2021, he was announced as the manager of Lech Poznań. He officially took over this position on 12 April. In the 2021–22 season, during which the club celebrated its 100th anniversary, Skorża led Lech to its 8th championship, and finished as runners-up in Polish Cup. On 6 June 2022, he was granted release from his contract, citing personal reasons.

=== Urawa Red Diamonds ===
On 10 November 2022, it was announced that Skorża would take over as Urawa Red Diamonds' manager from the 2023 season onwards. At the time of his appointment, the Reds have already qualified to the 2022 AFC Champions League final, which took place over two legs on 29 April and 6 May 2023. Under Skorża's lead, Urawa defeated defending champions Al Hilal 2–1 on aggregate, marking the third time they became Asian champions.

In late November 2023, he announced he would depart the team at the end of his one-year contract, and take another break from management in order to spend more time with his family in Poland. Urawa finished the league season in fourth place, their best result since 2016. They were also runners-up in the 2023 J.League Cup, exited the Emperor's Cup in the round of 16 and crashed out of the AFC Champions League group stages. He left the club shortly after achieving a 4th-place finish at the 2023 FIFA Club World Cup.

On 27 August 2024, following the dismissal of his successor Per-Mathias Høgmo, it was announced Skorża would be re-hired as manager of Urawa Red Diamonds. After obtaining a work visa, his appointment was confirmed on 5 September.

On 28 April 2026, Skorża and Urawa agreed to part ways following a seven-game winless streak.

== Managerial statistics ==
As of match played 25 April 2026

Managerial record by team and tenure
Team	Nat.	From	To	Record							
Team	Nat.	From	To	G	W	D	L	GF	GA	GD	Win %
Amica Wronki	(Poland)	17 June 2004	21 November 2005	45	15	13	17	52	61	−9	33.33
Dyskobolia	(Poland)	16 November 2006	6 June 2007	15	8	5	2	23	11	+12	53.33
Wisła Kraków	(Poland)	13 June 2007	15 March 2010	92	58	16	18	169	76	+93	63.04
Legia Warsaw	(Poland)	1 June 2010	30 May 2012	85	46	17	22	135	82	+53	54.12
Ettifaq FC	(Saudi Arabia)	26 September 2012	13 June 2013	31	10	7	14	38	47	−9	32.26
Lech Poznań	(Poland)	1 September 2014	12 October 2015	59	30	12	17	97	61	+36	50.85
Pogoń Szczecin	(Poland)	1 July 2017	30 October 2017	16	3	3	10	18	28	−10	18.75
United Arab Emirates U23	(United Arab Emirates)	19 March 2018	28 February 2020	16	7	4	5	31	28	+3	43.75
Lech Poznań	(Poland)	12 April 2021	6 June 2022	46	29	9	8	90	35	+55	63.04
Urawa Red Diamonds	(Japan)	1 February 2023	30 December 2023	58	24	19	15	77	56	+21	41.38
Urawa Red Diamonds	(Japan)	7 September 2024	28 April 2026	68	23	18	27	76	79	−3	33.82
Career total				531	253	123	155	806	564	+242	47.65

== Honours ==
=== Managerial ===
Amica Wronki youth

- Football Junior Championships of Poland: 2002

Dyskobolia

- Polish Cup: 2006–07

Wisła Kraków

- Ekstraklasa: 2007–08, 2008–09

Legia Warsaw

- Polish Cup: 2010–11, 2011–12

Lech Poznań

- Ekstraklasa: 2014–15, 2021–22
- Polish Super Cup: 2015

Urawa Red Diamonds

- AFC Champions League: 2022

Individual

- Polish Coach of the Year: 2007, 2011
- Ekstraklasa Coach of the Season: 2021–22
- Ekstraklasa Coach of the Month: October 2011, August 2021, October 2021, May 2022
- J1 League Manager of the Month: April 2025
