= Kasper Hämäläinen =

Finnish footballer (born 1986)

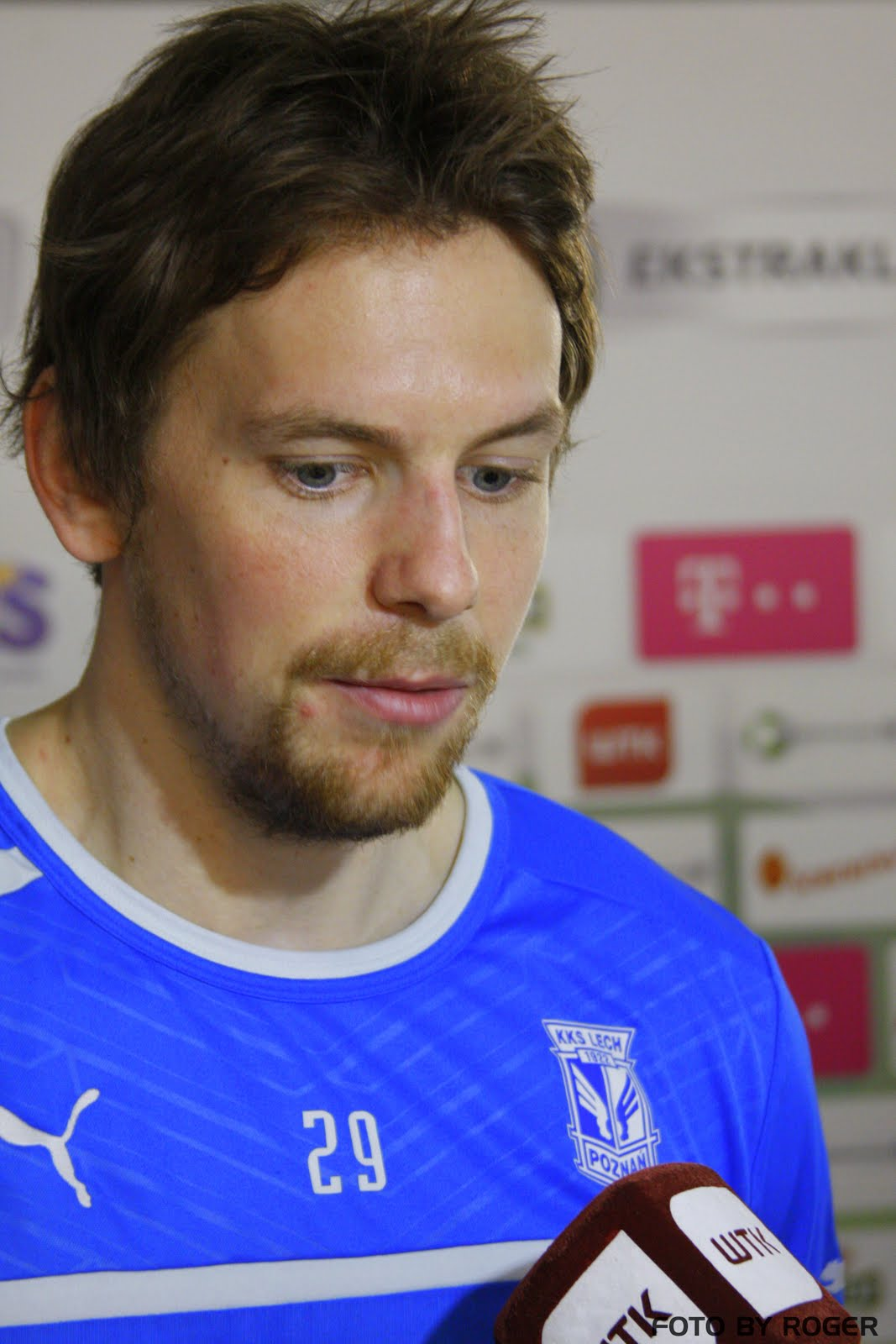
- Hämäläinen with Lech Poznań in 2013

Personal information
- Full name: Kasper Woldemar Hämäläinen
- Date of birth: 8 August 1986 (age 40)
- Place of birth: Turku, Finland
- Height: 1.87 m (6 ft 1 1/2 in)
- Position: Attacking midfielder

Team information
- Current team: TPS (sporting director)

Youth career
- 1995–1997: MaPS
- 1998–2001: Inter Turku
- 2002–2003: TPS

Senior career*
Years	Team	Apps	(Gls)
2003–2010	TPS	97	(12)
2010–2013	Djurgården	90	(8)
2013–2015	Lech Poznań	101	(33)
2016–2019	Legia Warsaw	90	(21)
2019–2020	Jablonec	15	(2)
2019–2020	Jablonec B	8	(1)
2021–2023	TPS	72	(19)

International career
2002	Finland U16	17	(0)
2003	Finland U17	10	(0)
2006–2009	Finland U21	21	(1)
2008–2019	Finland	63	(9)

Managerial career
- 2024–: TPS (sporting director)
- * Club domestic league appearances and goals

Kasper Woldemar Hämäläinen (born 8 August 1986) is a Finnish football executive and former professional player who played as an attacking midfielder. He is currently the sporting director of Ykkösliiga club TPS.

Hämäläinen was born in Turku, Finland, where he started his senior career in TPS before moving to Djurgården. Hämäläinen earned 63 caps for the Finland national team, having made his debut in November 2008. He returned to his former club TPS in 2021, and ended his professional career with the club at the end of the 2023 season.

== Club career ==
=== TPS Turku ===
Born in Turku, Hämäläinen started his career in his hometown club TPS. In June 2008, Portuguese Primeira Liga club C.D. Nacional was keen to sign him, but he was said to be too expensive. He visited Italian clubs Roma, Lazio, Udinese and Siena. NEC also showed interest. After the 2008 season, he was near a move to an unnamed Italian club but he chose to stay in Turku to secure play time in the first team.

=== Djurgårdens IF ===
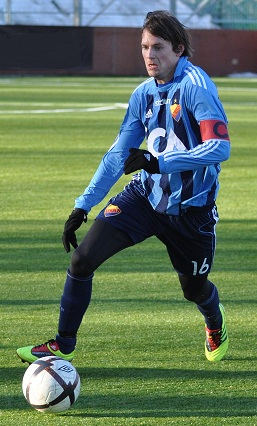
Hämäläinen with Djurgården in 2011

In December 2009, it was announced that Swedish club Djurgården had acquired him for a transfer fee of around €300,000. "Kasper" as his shirt says became a star in the Djurgården-shirt and started all the 30 league games in Allsvenskan during both the 2010 and 2011 season. During his two first season he played as a central midfielder besides his fellow country man Daniel Sjölund. In the 2012 pre-season Djurgården manager Magnus Pehrsson tried Hämäläinen in a more offensive role as a trequartista. Hämäläinen did it so well that the move became permanent.

=== Lech Poznań ===
However, in January 2013, it was announced that Hämäläinen had signed a three-year contract with Polish top-flight side Lech Poznań. The transfer fee was never made public, but it was believed to be around €410,000. On 24 February, he scored on his debut in a 4–0 away win over Ruch Chorzów. Hämäläinen gained 14 caps during the spring season of 2013 out of which he was in the starting eleven 12 times. In those 14 matches, he scored three goals.

In December 2015, Hämäläinen decided to not extend his contract with Lech, citing personal reasons and wishing to move elsewhere with his family. He made a total of 131 appearances for Lech, scoring 36 goals and helping the club win the 2014–15 Ekstraklasa and 2015 Polish Super Cup titles.

=== Legia Warsaw ===
On 11 January 2016, he joined Lech's archrivals Legia Warsaw on a free transfer, signing a 3 1/2-year deal.

=== Jablonec ===
On 6 September 2019, Hämäläinen joined Czech First League club FK Jablonec, signing a two-year deal.

=== Return to TPS ===
On 7 May 2021, it was announced that Hämäläinen would return to TPS with a 2.5-year contract. Hämäläinen announced that he will retire from professional football after the 2023 season.

== International career ==
Hämäläinen was part of the Finnish U17 team that represented in the 2003 U17 World Cup held in Finland. He was a regular member of the Finland U21 team that qualified to the 2009 U21 European Championship held in Sweden and played in all Finland's three matches.

He made his national team debut on 19 November 2008 against Switzerland when Stuart Baxter chose him to the starting line up for a match played in St. Gallen. During UEFA Euro 2012 qualifying he established himself as a regular in the national team. Hämäläinen scored his first international goal on 17 November 2010 against San Marino as he scored a brace in the 8–0 home victory.

== Later career ==
On 29 August 2024, it was announced that Hämäläinen would start as a sporting director of his former club Turun Palloseura.

== Personal life ==
Hämäläinen's father Heikki Hämäläinen is a former track and field athlete.

== Career statistics ==
=== Club ===
Appearances and goals by club, season and competition
Club	Season	League			National cup (Note: Includes Svenska Cupen, Polish Cup, Czech Cup, Finnish Cup)		League cup (Note: Includes Finnish League Cup and Ykköscup)		Europe		Other^{1}		Total	
Club	Season	Division	Apps	Goals	Apps	Goals	Apps	Goals	Apps	Goals	Apps	Goals	Apps	Goals
TPS	2003	Veikkausliiga	2	0	0	0	0	0	–		–		2	0
TPS	2004	Veikkausliiga	6	1	0	0	0	0	–		–		6	1
TPS	2005	Veikkausliiga	0	0	0	0	0	0	–		–		0	0
TPS	2006	Veikkausliiga	18	1	0	0	0	0	–		–		18	1
TPS	2007	Veikkausliiga	24	4	0	0	0	0	–		–		24	4
TPS	2008	Veikkausliiga	22	3	0	0	0	0	3 (Note: Appearances in UEFA Intertoto Cup)	0	–		25	3
TPS	2009	Veikkausliiga	25	0	1	0	1	0	–		–		27	0
TPS	Total		97	9	1	0	1	0	3	0	0	0	102	9
Djurgården	2010	Allsvenskan	30	2	1	0	–		–		–		31	2
Djurgården	2011	Allsvenskan	30	2	2	0	–		–		–		32	2
Djurgården	2012	Allsvenskan	30	4	1	2	–		–		–		31	6
Djurgården	Total		90	8	4	2	–		–		–		94	10
Lech Poznań	2012–13	Ekstraklasa	14	3	–		–		–		–		14	3
Lech Poznań	2013–14	Ekstraklasa	36	9	2	0	–		4 (Note: Appearances in UEFA Europa League)	0	–		42	9
Lech Poznań	2014–15	Ekstraklasa	36	13	4	1	–		4	1	–		44	15
Lech Poznań	2015–16	Ekstraklasa	15	8	3	0	–		12 (Note: Includes four appearances in UEFA Champions League, and eight appearances in UEFA Europa League)	1	1 (Note: Appearance in Polish Super Cup)	0	31	9
Lech Poznań	Total		101	33	9	1	–		20	2	1	0	131	36
Legia Warsaw	2015–16	Ekstraklasa	11	3	2	0	–		–		–		13	3
Legia Warsaw	2016–17	Ekstraklasa	31	7	1	1	–		4 (Note: Includes three appearances in UEFA Champions League, and one appearance in UEFA Europa League)	0	0	0	36	8
Legia Warsaw	2017–18	Ekstraklasa	31	9	3	0	–		6 (Note: Includes four appearances in UEFA Champions League, and two appearances in UEFA Europa League)	2	1	0	41	11
Legia Warsaw	2018–19	Ekstraklasa	17	2	2	0	–		4	0	1	0	24	2
Legia Warsaw	Total		90	21	8	1	–		14	2	2	0	114	24
Jablonec	2019–20	Czech First League	15	2	2	0	–		—		—		17	2
Jablonec B	2019–20	Bohemian Football League	1	0	0	0	–		—		—		1	0
Jablonec B	2020–21	Bohemian Football League	7	1	0	0	–		—		—		7	1
Jablonec B	Total		8	1	0	0	–		0	0	0	0	8	1
TPS	2021	Ykkönen	17	5	0	0	–		—		—		17	5
TPS	2022	Ykkönen	28	5	2	1	6	1	–		—		36	7
TPS	2023	Ykkönen	27	9	0	0	3	0	—		–		30	9
TPS	Total		72	19	2	1	9	1	0	0	–		93	21
Career total			473	93	26	5	10	1	37	4	3	0	548	103

=== International ===
Appearances and goals by national team, year and competition
National team	Year	Competitive		Friendly		Total	
National team	Year	Apps	Goals	Apps	Goals	Apps	Goals
Finland	2008	0	0	1	0	1	0
Finland	2009	2	0	1	0	2	0
Finland	2010	3	2	4	0	7	2
Finland	2011	6	2	3	1	9	3
Finland	2012	3	1	6	0	9	1
Finland	2013	6	1	4	1	10	2
Finland	2014	3	0	1	0	4	0
Finland	2015	6	0	0	0	6	0
Finland	2016	2	0	4	1	6	1
Finland	2017	5	0	1	0	6	0
Finland	2018	0	0	0	0	0	0
Finland	2019	2	0	0	0	2	0
Total		38	6	25	3	63	9

Finland score listed first, score column indicates score after each Hämäläinen goal.

International goals by date, venue, cap, opponent, score, result and competition
No.	Date	Venue	Cap	Opponent	Score	Result	Competition
1	17 November 2010	Helsinki Olympic Stadium, Helsinki, Finland	11	San Marino	2–0	8–0	UEFA Euro 2012 qualification
2	17 November 2010	Helsinki Olympic Stadium, Helsinki, Finland	11	San Marino	5–0	8–0	UEFA Euro 2012 qualification
3	10 August 2011	Skonto Stadium, Riga, Latvia	15	Latvia	1–0	2–0	Friendly
4	2 September 2011	Helsinki Olympic Stadium, Helsinki, Finland	16	Moldova	1–0	4–1	UEFA Euro 2012 qualification
5	2 September 2011	Helsinki Olympic Stadium, Helsinki, Finland	16	Moldova	2–0	4–1	UEFA Euro 2012 qualification
6	12 October 2012	Helsinki Olympic Stadium, Helsinki, Finland	28	Georgia	1–1	1–1	2014 FIFA World Cup qualification
7	7 June 2013	Helsinki Olympic Stadium, Helsinki, Finland	33	Belarus	1–0	1–0	2014 FIFA World Cup qualification
8	14 August 2013	Veritas Stadion, Turku, Finland	35	Slovenia	2–0	2–0	Friendly
9	1 June 2016	King Baudouin Stadium, Brussels, Belgium	52	Belgium	1–0	1–1	Friendly

== Honours ==
Lech Poznań

- Ekstraklasa: 2014–15
- Polish Super Cup: 2015

Legia Warsaw

- Ekstraklasa: 2015–16, 2016–17, 2017–18
- Polish Cup: 2015–16, 2017–18
