= Mateusz Szczepaniak (footballer, born 1991) =

Polish footballer

Personal information
- Full name: Mateusz Sebastian Szczepaniak
- Date of birth: 23 January 1991 (age 35)
- Place of birth: Lubin, Poland
- Height: 1.84 m (6 ft 0 in)
- Position: Forward

Youth career
- –2006: Amico Lubin
- 2006–2008: Zagłębie Lubin
- 2008–2010: Auxerre

Senior career*
Years	Team	Apps	(Gls)
2010–2012	Auxerre B	16	(2)
2011–2012	→ Zagłębie Lubin (loan)	1	(0)
2012–2013	KS Polkowice	33	(9)
2013–2016	Miedź Legnica	63	(16)
2015–2016	→ Podbeskidzie (loan)	33	(10)
2016–2018	Cracovia	52	(6)
2018	→ Piast Gliwice (loan)	14	(3)
2018–2019	Miedź Legnica	18	(3)
2019–2020	Enosis Neon Paralimni	11	(2)
2020–2021	Warta Poznań	10	(1)
Total		251	(52)

International career
2007	Poland U17	1	(0)
2009–2010	Poland U19	4	(0)
2010–2012	Poland U20	7	(1)
- * Club domestic league appearances and goals

Mateusz Sebastian Szczepaniak (born 23 January 1991) is a Polish former professional footballer who played as a forward.

== Club career ==
Szczepaniak began his football career at Amico Lubin, from where he joined the Zagłębie Lubin academy in 2006. In 2008, he moved to the youth academy of French club AJ Auxerre and played for its reserve team. On 1 July 2011, he was loaned to Zagłębie Lubin for the 2011–12 season.

On 6 November 2011, during a 1–5 loss to Śląsk Wrocław, he made his Ekstraklasa debut, which was his only appearance that season. On 6 August 2012, he transferred to second-division side KS Polkowice. During the 2012–13 season, he scored 9 goals in 33 league appearances for the club. This performance earned him a transfer to I liga side Miedź Legnica, where he made 64 appearances and scored 16 goals in the league.

On 8 July 2015, he was loaned for the entire 2015–16 season to Ekstraklasa club Podbeskidzie Bielsko-Biała. During that season, he played 35 matches (33 league games and 2 Polish Cup matches), scoring 10 goals, but the team was relegated from Ekstraklasa. On 20 May 2016, he signed a four-year contract with Cracovia, effective from 1 July 2016. He debuted for Cracovia on 17 July 2016, scoring a goal in a 5–1 win against Piast Gliwice in the first round of the 2016–17 Ekstraklasa season.
