= 2015 Polish Super Cup =

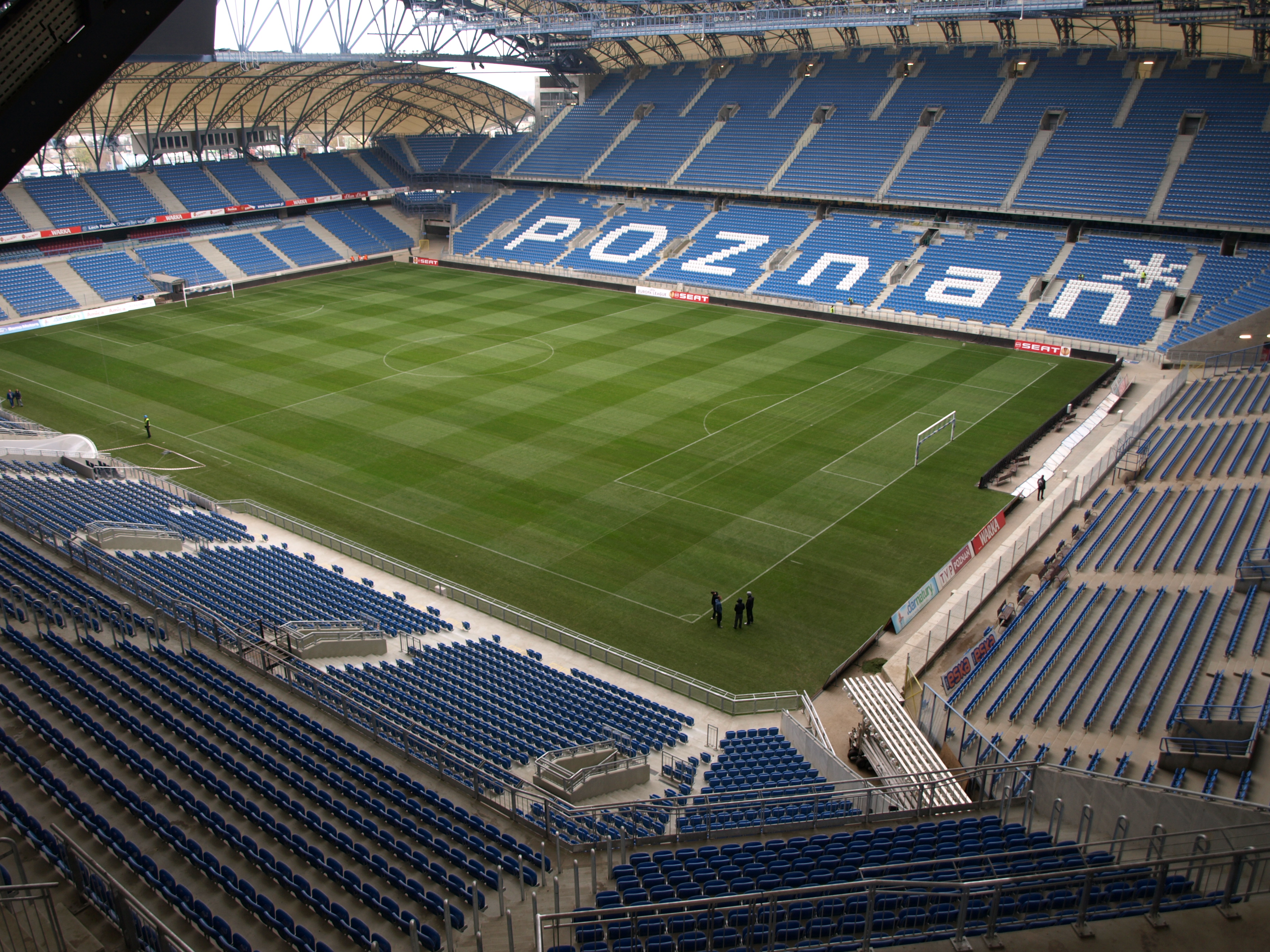
- The INEA Stadion in Poznań hosted the final.
Lech Poznań	Legia Warsaw
3	1
- Date: 10 July 2015
- Venue: INEA Stadion, Poznań
- Referee: Mariusz Złotek (Stalowa Wola)
- Attendance: 40,088

The 2015 Polish Super Cup was held on 10 July 2015 between the 2014–15 Ekstraklasa winners Lech Poznań and the 2014–15 Polish Cup winners Legia Warsaw. Lech won the match 3–1 and won the trophy for the fifth time.

== Match details ==
10 July 2015
20:15 CEST (UTC+02:00)

Lech Poznań	3–1	Legia Warsaw
Kędziora 10'; Kamiński 35'; Linetty 87'	Report	Żyro 90+5'

INEA Stadion, Poznań
Attendance: 40,088
Referee: Mariusz Złotek (Stalowa Wola)

Lech Poznań	Legia Warsaw

Lech Poznań:
GK	1	(Bosnia and Herzegovina) Jasmin Burić
RB	4	(Poland) Tomasz Kędziora		(substituted off) 67'
CB	5	(Hungary) Tamás Kádár	(yellow card) 58'
CB	35	(Poland) Marcin Kamiński
LB	3	(Scotland) Barry Douglas	(yellow card) 31'
CM	6	(Poland) Łukasz Trałka (c)	(yellow card) 44'
CM	7	(Poland) Karol Linetty
RM	24	(Poland) Dawid Kownacki		(substituted off) 79'
AM	19	(Finland) Kasper Hämäläinen		(substituted off) 67'
LM	8	(Poland) Szymon Pawłowski		(substituted off) 46'
CF	22	(Poland) Marcin Robak	(yellow card) 32'	(substituted off) 46'
Substitutes:
GK	33	(Poland) Maciej Gostomski
MF	10	(Switzerland) Darko Jevtić		(substituted on) 67'
MF	15	(Poland) Dariusz Dudka		(substituted on) 79'
FW	18	(Germany) Denis Thomalla		(substituted on) 46'
DF	21	(The Gambia) Kebba Ceesay		(substituted on) 67'
MF	28	(Poland) Dariusz Formella		(substituted on) 46'
MF	55	(Ghana) Abdul Aziz Tetteh
Manager:
(Poland) Maciej Skorża

Legia Warsaw:
GK	12	(Slovakia) Dušan Kuciak
RB	28	(Poland) Łukasz Broź
CB	4	(Poland) Igor Lewczuk
CB	25	(Poland) Jakub Rzeźniczak (c)	(yellow card) 32'
LB	17	(Poland) Tomasz Brzyski
CM	3	(Poland) Tomasz Jodłowiec
CM	2	(Poland) Michał Pazdan		(substituted off) 64'
RM	6	(Brazil) Guilherme		(substituted off) 64'
AM	45	(Poland) Adam Ryczkowski		(substituted off) 46'
LM	18	(Poland) Michał Kucharczyk		(substituted off) 73'
CF	11	(Hungary) Nemanja Nikolić		(substituted off) 82'
Substitutes:
GK	34	(Poland) Arkadiusz Malarz
MF	8	(Slovakia) Ondrej Duda		(substituted on) 46'
FW	9	(Poland) Marek Saganowski		(substituted on) 82'
MF	16	(Poland) Michał Masłowski		(substituted on) 73'
DF	19	(Poland) Bartosz Bereszyński
MF	33	(Poland) Michał Żyro		(substituted on) 64'
MF	37	(Poland) Dominik Furman		(substituted on) 64'
Manager:
(Norway) Henning Berg

== See also ==
- 2015–16 Ekstraklasa
- 2015–16 Polish Cup
