= Krzysztof Kotorowski =

Polish footballer

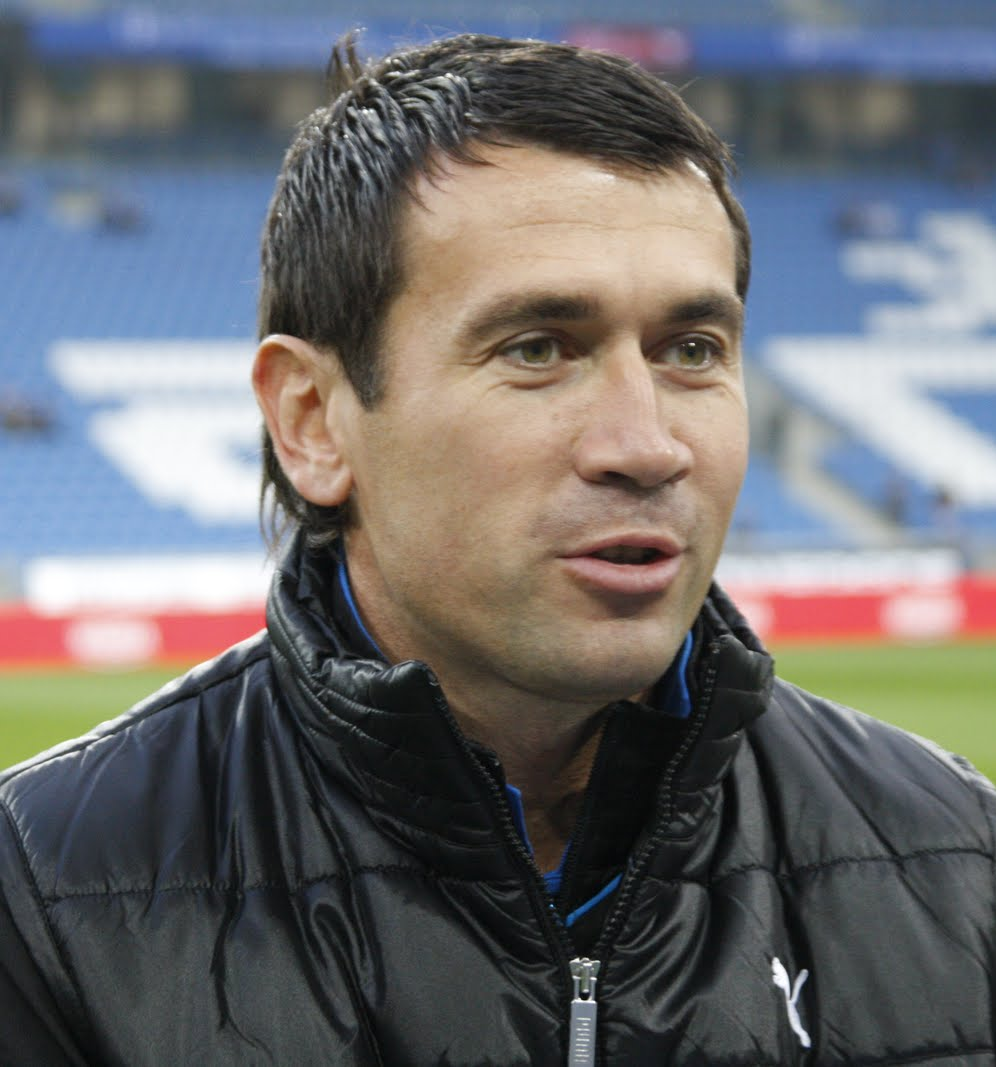
- Kotorowski with Lech Poznań

Personal information
- Date of birth: 12 September 1976 (age 50)
- Place of birth: Poznań, Poland
- Height: 1.86 m (6 ft 1 in)
- Position: Goalkeeper

Youth career
- Olimpia Poznań

Senior career*
| Years | Team | Apps | (Gls) |
| 1994–1995 | Olimpia Poznań | 0 | (0) |
| 1995–1996 | Luboński KS | | |
| 1996–2003 | Dyskobolia Grodzisk Wlkp. | 78 | (0) |
| 2003 | Błękitni Stargard Szczeciński | 13 | (0) |
| 2004–2016 | Lech Poznań | 174 | (0) |
| 2013–2015 | Lech Poznań II | 3 | (0) |
- * Club domestic league appearances and goals

Krzysztof Kotorowski (born 12 September 1976) is a Polish former professional footballer who played as a goalkeeper. He currently works as a goalkeeping coach for Lech Poznań's academy.

== Career ==
Kotorowski was a product of Olimpia Poznań's youth team and broke into their senior squad. After the club's controversial merger and relocation, he played for many years for Dyskobolia Grodzisk Wielkopolski. He returned to Poznań in 2004 where he played for Lech until his retirement in 2016.

== Career statistics ==
Appearances and goals by club, season and competition
| Club | Season | League | | | Polish Cup | | League cup (Note: Includes Polish League Cup and Ekstraklasa Cup) | | Europe | | Total | |
| Club | Season | Division | Apps | Goals | Apps | Goals | Apps | Goals | Apps | Goals | Apps | Goals |
|---|---|---|---|---|---|---|---|---|---|---|---|---|
| Dyskobolia Grodzisk Wielkopolski | 1997–98 | Ekstraklasa | 1 | 0 | | | — | | — | | 1 | 0 |
| Dyskobolia Grodzisk Wielkopolski | 1998–99 | II liga | | | | | — | | — | | | |
| Dyskobolia Grodzisk Wielkopolski | 1999–2000 | Ekstraklasa | 30 | 0 | 1 | 0 | 2 | 0 | — | | 33 | 0 |
| Dyskobolia Grodzisk Wielkopolski | 2000–01 | Ekstraklasa | 14 | 0 | 1 | 0 | 2 | 0 | — | | 17 | 0 |
| Dyskobolia Grodzisk Wielkopolski | 2001–02 | Ekstraklasa | 8 | 0 | 3 | 0 | 4 | 0 | — | | 15 | 0 |
| Dyskobolia Grodzisk Wielkopolski | 2002–03 | Ekstraklasa | 0 | 0 | 0 | 0 | 0 | 0 | — | | 0 | 0 |
| Dyskobolia Grodzisk Wielkopolski | Total | | 53 | 0 | 5 | 0 | 8 | 0 | — | | 66 | 0 |
| Błękitni Stargard Szczeciński | 2003–04 | II liga | 13 | 0 | 0 | 0 | — | | — | | 13 | 0 |
| Lech Poznań | 2003–04 | Ekstraklasa | 1 | 0 | 0 | 0 | — | | — | | 1 | 0 |
| Lech Poznań | 2004–05 | Ekstraklasa | 6 | 0 | 2 | 0 | — | | — | | 8 | 0 |
| Lech Poznań | 2005–06 | Ekstraklasa | 28 | 0 | 8 | 0 | — | | 3 (Note: Appearances in UEFA Intertoto Cup) | 0 | 39 | 0 |
| Lech Poznań | 2006–07 | Ekstraklasa | 29 | 0 | 4 | 0 | 2 | 0 | 0 | 0 | 35 | 0 |
| Lech Poznań | 2007–08 | Ekstraklasa | 21 | 0 | 1 | 0 | 4 | 0 | — | | 26 | 0 |
| Lech Poznań | 2008–09 | Ekstraklasa | 18 | 0 | 3 | 0 | 2 | 0 | 6 (Note: Appearances in UEFA Europa League) | 0 | 29 | 0 |
| Lech Poznań | 2009–10 | Ekstraklasa | 7 | 0 | 0 | 0 | — | | 1 | 0 | 8 | 0 |
| Lech Poznań | 2010–11 | Ekstraklasa | 19 | 0 | 6 | 0 | — | | 9 (Note: Four appearances in UEFA Champions League, five appearances in UEFA Europa League) | 0 | 34 | 0 |
| Lech Poznań | 2011–12 | Ekstraklasa | 13 | 0 | 1 | 0 | — | | — | | 14 | 0 |
| Lech Poznań | 2012–13 | Ekstraklasa | 9 | 0 | 1 | 0 | — | | 2 | 0 | 12 | 0 |
| Lech Poznań | 2013–14 | Ekstraklasa | 16 | 0 | 1 | 0 | — | | 3 | 0 | 20 | 0 |
| Lech Poznań | 2014–15 | Ekstraklasa | 6 | 0 | 0 | 0 | — | | 1 | 0 | 7 | 0 |
| Lech Poznań | 2015–16 | Ekstraklasa | 1 | 0 | 0 | 0 | — | | 0 | 0 | 1 | 0 |
| Lech Poznań | Total | | 174 | 0 | 27 | 0 | 8 | 0 | 25 | 0 | 234 | 0 |
| Career total | | | 240 | 0 | 32 | 0 | 16 | 0 | 25 | 0 | 313 | 0 |

== Honours ==
Lech Poznań

- Ekstraklasa: 2009–10, 2014–15
- Polish Cup: 2008–09
