= Aleksandar Atanacković (footballer, born 1980) =

Serbian former footballer

Personal information
- Full name: Aleksandar Atanacković
- Date of birth: 29 November 1980 (age 45)
- Place of birth: Belgrade, SFR Yugoslavia
- Height: 1.82 m (5 ft 11 1/2 in)
- Position: Midfielder

Youth career
- Partizan

Senior career*
Years	Team	Apps	(Gls)
- Hajduk Kula
–2001	FK Zvezdara		
2002	Wacker Burghausen	4	(0)
2004–2005	Milicionar		
2006	Zawisza Bydgoszcz	7	(0)
2006	Unia Janikowo	5	(0)
2007	Piast Kołodziejewo		
2007–2008	Zdrój Ciechocinek	25	(2)
2008–2009	Elana Toruń	47	(8)
2010–2012	Chojniczanka Chojnice	69	(1)
2012	Lech Rypin	16	(0)
2013–2016	Wigry Suwałki	70	(3)
2016	MKS Ełk	13	(0)
2017	Bałtyk Gdynia	7	(0)
2017–2018	Kaszubia Kościerzyna	34	(2)
2018–2021	Pogoń Lębork	86	(17)
2022–2024	Gwiazda Karsin	58	(5)
- * Club domestic league appearances and goals as of 24 October 2024

Aleksandar Atanacković (Cyrillic: Александар Aтaнaцкoвић; born 29 November 1980) is a Serbian professional footballer who plays as a midfielder.

== Honours ==
Chojniczanka Chojnice

- III liga Pomerania–West Pomerania: 2009–10

Wigry Suwałki

- II liga East: 2013–14
