= 2016–17 Lech Poznań season =

Lech Poznań
2016–17 season
- Chairman: Karol Klimczak
- Manager: Nenad Bjelica (From 30 August 2016); Jan Urban (Until 29 August 2016)
- Stadium: INEA Stadion
- Ekstraklasa: 3rd
- Polish Cup: Runner-up
- Polish Super Cup: Winners
- Top goalscorer: League: Marcin Robak (18 goals); All: Marcin Robak (21 goals)
- Highest home attendance: Ekstraklasa: 41,026 vs. Legia (9 April 2017)
- Lowest home attendance: Ekstraklasa: 9,591 vs. Wisła P. (29 October 2016)
- Average home league attendance: 19,631
Home colours	Away colours
- All statistics correct as of 5 June 2017.

Lech Poznań is a Polish football club based in Poznań. This was their 94th season overall. They competed in Ekstraklasa, the highest ranking league in Poland.

== Squad ==
As of 21 February 2017.

Note: Flags indicate national team as defined under FIFA eligibility rules; some limited exceptions apply. Players may hold more than one non-FIFA nationality.

No.	Pos.	Nation	Player
1	GK	(Bosnia and Herzegovina) BIH	Jasmin Burić
3	DF	(Denmark) DEN	Lasse Nielsen
4	DF	(Poland) POL	Tomasz Kędziora (3rd captain)
6	MF	(Poland) POL	Łukasz Trałka (Captain)
8	MF	(Poland) POL	Szymon Pawłowski (Vice-captain)
10	MF	(Switzerland) SUI	Darko Jevtić
11	FW	(Poland) POL	Marcin Robak
14	MF	(Poland) POL	Maciej Gajos
15	DF	(Poland) POL	Dariusz Dudka
17	MF	(Poland) POL	Maciej Makuszewski (on loan from Lechia Gdańsk)
18	MF	(Romania) ROU	Mihai Răduț
19	FW	(Denmark) DEN	Nicki Bille Nielsen
21	MF	(Colombia) COL	Víctor Gutiérrez (on loan from (Colombia) Deportes Tolima)

No.	Pos.	Nation	Player
22	DF	(Ukraine) UKR	Volodymyr Kostevych
24	FW	(Poland) POL	Dawid Kownacki
25	FW	(Poland) POL	Paweł Tomczyk
26	DF	(Poland) POL	Maciej Wilusz
27	DF	(Poland) POL	Tymoteusz Puchacz
28	DF	(Poland) POL	Marcin Wasielewski
30	GK	(Slovakia) SVK	Matúš Putnocký
31	GK	(Poland) POL	Bartosz Mrozek
33	GK	(Poland) POL	Miłosz Mleczko
35	DF	(Poland) POL	Jan Bednarek
44	DF	(Croatia) CRO	Elvis Kokalović
55	MF	(Ghana) GHA	Abdul Aziz Tetteh
86	MF	(Poland) POL	Radosław Majewski

=== Out on loan ===
Note: Flags indicate national team as defined under FIFA eligibility rules; some limited exceptions apply. Players may hold more than one non-FIFA nationality.

No.	Pos.	Nation	Player
2	DF	(Poland) POL	Robert Gumny (at Podbeskidzie Bielsko-Biała until 30 June 2017)
16	MF	(Poland) POL	Jakub Serafin (at Bytovia Bytów until 30 June 2017)
17	MF	(Poland) POL	Szymon Drewniak (at Górnik Łęczna until 30 June 2017)
20	MF	(Poland) POL	Dariusz Formella (at Arka Gdynia until 30 June 2017)
29	MF	(Poland) POL	Kamil Jóźwiak (at GKS Katowice until 30 June 2017)

No.	Pos.	Nation	Player
34	FW	(Poland) POL	Piotr Kurbiel (at Pogoń Siedlce until 30 June 2017)
36	GK	(Poland) POL	Mateusz Lis (at Raków Częstochowa until 30 June 2018)
77	MF	(Norway) NOR	Muhamed Keita (at (Norway) Vålerenga until 30 June 2017)
—	GK	(Poland) POL	Adam Makuchowski (at Chrobry Głogów until 30 June 2017)
—	MF	(Poland) POL	Krystian Sanocki (at Kotwica Kołobrzeg until 30 June 2017)

== Transfer ==
=== Summer transfer window ===
==== In ====
No.	Pos.	Nat.	Name	Age	EU	Moving from	Type	Transfer window	Ends	Transfer fee	Source
35	DF	(Poland)	Jan Bednarek	20	EU	Górnik Łęczna	End of loan	Summer	2017	Free	
17	MF	(Poland)	Szymon Drewniak	22	EU	Chrobry Głogów	End of loan	Summer	2016	Free	
20	MF	(Poland)	Dariusz Formella	20	EU	Arka Gdynia	End of loan	Summer	2019	Free	
86	MF	(Poland)	Radosław Majewski	29	EU	(Greece) Veria	Transfer	Summer	2019	Free	
17	MF	(Poland)	Maciej Makuszewski	26	EU	Lechia Gdańsk	Loan	Summer	2017	Free	
33	GK	(Poland)	Miłosz Mleczko	17	EU		Transfer	Summer	Undisclosed	Youth system	
31	GK	(Poland)	Bartosz Mrozek	16	EU		Transfer	Summer	Undisclosed	Youth system	
3	DF	(Denmark)	Lasse Nielsen	29	EU	(Denmark) OB	Transfer	Summer	2019	Free	
30	GK	(Slovakia)	Matúš Putnocký	31	EU	Ruch Chorzów	Transfer	Summer	2019	Free	
28	DF	(Poland)	Marcin Wasielewski	22	EU		Transfer	Summer	Undisclosed	Youth system	

Total spending: €0

==== Out ====
No.	Pos.	Nat.	Name	Age	EU	Moving to	Type	Transfer window	Transfer fee	Source
21	DF	(The Gambia) (Sweden)	Kebba Ceesay	28	EU	(Sweden) Djurgårdens IF	Transfer	Summer	€15,000	
17	MF	(Poland)	Szymon Drewniak	22	EU	Górnik Łęczna	Loan	Summer	Free	
35	DF	(Poland)	Marcin Kamiński	24	EU	(Germany) VfB Stuttgart	End of contract	Summer	Free	
77	MF	(Norway) (The Gambia)	Muhamed Keita	25	Non-EU	(Norway) Stabæk	Loan	Summer	Free	
27	GK	(Poland)	Krzysztof Kotorowski	39	EU		End of career	Summer		
34	FW	(Poland)	Piotr Kurbiel	20	EU	Pogoń Siedlce	Loan	Summer	Free	
7	MF	(Poland)	Karol Linetty	21	EU	(Italy) Sampdoria	Transfer	Summer	€3,000,000	
36	GK	(Poland)	Mateusz Lis	19	EU	Podbeskidzie Bielsko-Biała	Loan	Summer	Free	
11	MF	(Hungary)	Gergő Lovrencsics	27	EU	(Hungary) Ferencváros	End of contract	Summer	Free	
	GK	(Poland)	Adam Makuchowski	19	EU	ROW 1964 Rybnik	Loan	Summer	Free	
31	MF	(Poland)	Krystian Sanocki	19	EU	MKS Kluczbork	Loan	Summer	Free	
25	MF	(Spain)	Sisi	30	EU	(Greece) Veria	End of contract	Summer	Free	
18	FW	(Germany)	Denis Thomalla	23	EU	(Germany) 1. FC Heidenheim	Transfer	Summer	€350,000	
3	DF	(Montenegro) (Serbia)	Vladimir Volkov	30	Non-EU	(Belgium) KV Mechelen	End of loan	Summer	Free	
37	MF	(Germany) (Poland)	Niklas Zulciak	22	EU	Lech II Poznań	End of contract	Summer	Free	

Total income: ▲€3,365,000

Total expenditure: ▲€3,365,000

=== Winter transfer window ===
==== In ====
No.	Pos.	Nat.	Name	Age	EU	Moving from	Type	Transfer window	Ends	Transfer fee	Source
21	MF	(Colombia)	Víctor Gutiérrez	20	Non-EU	(Colombia) Deportes Tolima	Loan	Winter	2017	Free	
44	DF	(Croatia)	Elvis Kokalović	28	EU	(Turkey) Karabükspor	Transfer	Winter	2017	Undisclosed	
22	DF	(Ukraine)	Volodymyr Kostevych	24	Non-EU	(Ukraine) Karpaty Lviv	Transfer	Winter	2020	€350,000	
27	DF	(Poland)	Tymoteusz Puchacz	17	EU		Transfer	Winter	Undisclosed	Youth system	
18	MF	(Romania)	Mihai Răduț	26	EU	(United Arab Emirates) Hatta Club	Transfer	Winter	2017	Free	
	MF	(Poland)	Krystian Sanocki	20	EU	MKS Kluczbork	Loan return	Winter	Undisclosed	Free	
25	FW	(Poland)	Paweł Tomczyk	18	EU		Transfer	Winter	Undisclosed	Youth system	

Total spending: ▼€350,000

==== Out ====
No.	Pos.	Nat.	Name	Age	EU	Moving to	Type	Transfer window	Transfer fee	Source
23	DF	(Finland)	Paulus Arajuuri	28	EU	(Denmark) Brøndby IF	End of contract	Winter	Free	
20	FW	(Poland)	Dariusz Formella	21	EU	Arka Gdynia	Loan	Winter	Free	
2	DF	(Poland)	Robert Gumny	18	EU	Podbeskidzie Bielsko-Biała	Loan	Winter	Free	
29	MF	(Poland)	Kamil Jóźwiak	18	EU	GKS Katowice	Loan	Winter	Free	
5	DF	(Hungary)	Tamás Kádár	26	EU	(Ukraine) Dynamo Kyiv	Transfer	Winter	€2,000,000	
77	MF	(Norway) (The Gambia)	Muhamed Keita	26	Non-EU	(Norway) Vålerenga	Loan	Winter	Free	
36	GK	(Poland)	Mateusz Lis	19	EU	Raków Częstochowa	Loan	Winter	Free	
	GK	(Poland)	Adam Makuchowski	20	EU	Chrobry Głogów	Loan	Winter	Free	
	MF	(Poland)	Krystian Sanocki	20	EU	Kotwica Kołobrzeg	Loan	Winter	Free	

Total income: ▲€2,000,000

Total expenditure: ▲€1,650,000

== Friendlies ==
Win Draw Loss

18 June 2016 Club friendly	Victoria Września	0–9	Lech Poznań	Września, Poland
15:00 CEST (UTC+02:00)		Report	Pawłowski 10'; Kownacki 34', 39'; Robak 50', 72', 79'; Ceesay 53'; Jóźwiak 62', 88'	Stadium: Stadion Miejski; Referee: Tomasz Zieliński (Konin)

22 June 2016 Club friendly	Wisła Płock	0–2	Lech Poznań	Kępa, Poland
17:00 CEST (UTC+02:00)		Report	Kownacki 32' (pen.); Formella 55'	Stadium: BoniFaCio Spa & Sport Resort; Referee: Artur Mital (Ciechanów)

24 June 2016 Club friendly	Górnik Łęczna	2–2	Lech Poznań	Kępa, Poland
15:30 CEST (UTC+02:00)	Danielewicz 8'; Bogusławski 48'	Report	Bille 45'; Makuszewski 76'	Stadium: BoniFaCio Spa & Sport Resort; Referee: Artur Mital (Ciechanów)

28 June 2016 Club friendly	Arka Gdynia	0–1	Lech Poznań	Ostróda, Poland
17:00 CEST (UTC+02:00)		Report	Robak 90+2'	Stadium: Stadion Miejski; Attendance: 200

2 July 2016 Club friendly	Lech Poznań	3–0	Zagłębie Lubin	Grodzisk Wielkopolski, Poland
11:30 CEST (UTC+02:00)	Bille 11'; Gajos 35'; Jóźwiak 80'	Report		Stadium: Dyskobolia Stadium

3 September 2016 Club friendly	Lech Poznań	2–1	Olimpia Grudziądz	Wągrowiec, Poland
12:30 CEST (UTC+02:00)	Jevtić 52'; Tomczyk 80'	Report	Warchoł 9'	Stadium: Stadion im. Stanisława Bąka; Referee: Szymon Lizak (Poznań)

14 January 2017 Club friendly	Lech Poznań	8–0	Sokół Kleczew	Poznań, Poland
13:00 CET (UTC+01:00)	Tomczyk 15', 26'; Kostevych 67'; Gutiérrez 69'; Górski 71' (o.g.); Trałka 82'; Kownacki 84' (pen.), 89'	Report		Stadium: Lech Poznań training ground

21 January 2017 Club friendly	Lech Poznań	0–0	(Russia) Ufa	Paralimni, Cyprus
14:00 CET (UTC+01:00)		Report		Stadium: Stadium "Tasos Markou"

24 January 2017 Club friendly	Lech Poznań	3–1	(Bulgaria) Beroe Stara Zagora	Larnaca, Cyprus
14:00 CET (UTC+01:00)	Kownacki 74'; Tomczyk 88'; Robak 90'	Report	Kirilov 44'	Stadium: Alpha Sports Center

26 January 2017 Club friendly	Lech Poznań	1–1	(Hungary) Újpest	Larnaca, Cyprus
14:00 CET (UTC+01:00)	Majewski 26'	Report	Bardhi 34'	Stadium: Alpha Sports Center

4 February 2017 Club friendly	Lech Poznań	8–0	Elana Toruń	Poznań, Poland
13:00 CET (UTC+01:00)	Gajos 19'; Makuszewski 31', 38'; Piotrowski 45' (o.g.); Kownacki 59'; Nielsen 64'; Jevtić 70'; Robak 85'	Report		Stadium: INEA Stadion; Attendance: 999; Referee: Szymon Lizak (Poznań)

15 March 2017 Club friendly	Lech Poznań	0–0	Lech II Poznań	Poznań, Poland
15:30 CET (UTC+01:00)		Report		Stadium: Lech Poznań training ground

25 March 2017 Club friendly	Lech Poznań	2–0	Chrobry Głogów	Poznań, Poland
15:00 CET (UTC+01:00)	Robak 13' (pen.); Trałka 84'	Report		Stadium: Lech Poznań training ground

== Competitions ==
Win Draw Loss

=== Overall ===
Competition	Started round	Current position / round	Final position / round	First match	Last match
2016–17 Ekstraklasa	—	—	3rd	15 July 2016	4 June 2017
2016–17 Polish Cup	Round of 32	—	Runner-up	9 August 2016	2 May 2017
2016 Polish Super Cup	Final	—	Winners	7 July 2016	

Updated to match played 5 June 2017
Source: Competitions

=== Overview ===
Competition	Record							
Competition	G	W	D	L	GF	GA	GD	Win %
Ekstraklasa	37	20	9	8	62	29	+33	54.05
Polish Cup	7	5	1	1	16	5	+11	71.43
Polish Super Cup	1	1	0	0	4	1	+3	100.00
Total	45	26	10	9	82	35	+47	57.78

Updated to match played 5 June 2017
Source: Competitions

=== Ekstraklasa ===
==== Regular season ====
===== League table =====
Pos	Team	Pld	W	D	L	GF	GA	GD	Pts	Qualification
1	Jagiellonia Białystok	30	18	5	7	56	31	+25	59	Qualification for the championship round
2	Legia Warsaw	30	17	7	6	58	30	+28	58	Qualification for the championship round
3	Lech Poznań	30	16	7	7	50	22	+28	55	Qualification for the championship round
4	Lechia Gdańsk	30	16	5	9	46	37	+9	53	Qualification for the championship round
5	Wisła Kraków	30	13	5	12	45	46	−1	44	Qualification for the championship round

Source: Ekstraklasa, 90minut, Soccerway
Rules for classification: 1) Points; 2) Head-to-head points; 3) Head-to-head goal difference; 4) Head-to-head goals scored; 5) Head-to-head away goals scored (only if two teams); 6) Goal difference; 7) Goals scored; 8) Fairplay ranking; 9) Draw. (Note: Head-to-head record is used only after all the matches between the teams in question have been played).

===== Results summary =====
Overall								Home						Away					
Pld	W	D	L	GF	GA	GD	Pts	W	D	L	GF	GA	GD	W	D	L	GF	GA	GD
30	16	7	7	50	22	+28	55	9	3	3	22	9	+13	7	4	4	28	13	+15

Last updated: 22 April 2017.
Source: 90minut.pl

===== Results by round =====
Round	1	2	3	4	5	6	7	8	9	10	11	12	13	14	15	16	17	18	19	20	21	22	23	24	25	26	27	28	29	30
Ground	A	H	H	A	H	A	H	H	A	H	A	H	A	H	A	H	A	A	H	A	H	A	A	H	A	H	A	H	A	H
Result	D	L	L	L	W	D	W	W	L	D	W	D	L	W	W	W	W	L	W	D	W	W	W	W	W	D	D	L	W	W
Position	9	14	16	16	15	15	12	8	8	8	7	7	9	8	6	5	5	5	4	5	4	4	3	3	2	3	3	4	4	3

Updated to match(es) played on 22 April 2017. Source: 90minut.pl
A = Away; H = Home; W = Win; D = Draw; L = Loss

===== Matches =====
Win Draw Loss

15 July 2016 Match 1	Śląsk Wrocław	0–0	Lech Poznań	Wrocław
20:30 CEST (UTC+02:00)		Report		Stadium: Stadion Miejski; Attendance: 12,402; Referee: Bartosz Frankowski (Toruń)

24 July 2016 Match 2	Lech Poznań	0–2	Zagłębie Lubin	Poznań
18:00 CEST (UTC+02:00)		Report	Papadopulos 33'; Starzyński 63'	Stadium: INEA Stadion; Attendance: 16,354; Referee: Daniel Stefański (Bydgoszcz)

29 July 2016 Match 3	Lech Poznań	0–2	Jagiellonia Białystok	Poznań
20:30 CEST (UTC+02:00)		Report	Vassiljev 61', 72'	Stadium: INEA Stadion; Attendance: 10,396; Referee: Paweł Raczkowski (Warsaw)

6 August 2016 Match 4	Korona Kielce	4–1	Lech Poznań	Kielce
20:30 CEST (UTC+02:00)	Sekulski 21' (pen.), 50'; Palanca 70'; Grzelak 79'	Report	Robak 16'	Stadium: Stadion Miejski; Attendance: 5,989; Referee: Piotr Lasyk (Bytom)

12 August 2016 Match 5	Lech Poznań	2–1	Cracovia	Poznań
20:30 CEST (UTC+02:00)	Bednarek 64'; Robak 78'	Report	Čovilo 81'	Stadium: INEA Stadion; Attendance: 10,724; Referee: Tomasz Kwiatkowski (Warsaw)

19 August 2016 Match 6	Bruk-Bet Termalica Nieciecza	0–0	Lech Poznań	Nieciecza
20:30 CEST (UTC+02:00)		Report		Stadium: Stadion Termaliki Bruk-Bet; Attendance: 4,595; Referee: Szymon Marciniak (Płock)

28 August 2016 Match 7	Lech Poznań	2–0	Piast Gliwice	Poznań
15:30 CEST (UTC+02:00)	Formella 73'; Gajos 90'	Report		Stadium: INEA Stadion; Attendance: 11,254; Referee: Paweł Raczkowski (Warsaw)

11 September 2016 Match 8	Lech Poznań	3–1	Pogoń Szczecin	Poznań
15:30 CEST (UTC+02:00)	Robak 10', 27'; Tetteh 89'	Report	Zwoliński 7'	Stadium: INEA Stadion; Attendance: 17,247; Referee: Szymon Marciniak (Płock)

18 September 2016 Match 9	Lechia Gdańsk	2–1	Lech Poznań	Gdańsk
15:30 CEST (UTC+02:00)	M. Paixão 38'; Wilusz 87' (o.g.)	Report	Robak 35'	Stadium: Stadion Energa; Attendance: 26,054; Referee: Tomasz Kwiatkowski (Warsaw)

25 September 2016 Match 10	Lech Poznań	0–0	Arka Gdynia	Poznań
18:00 CEST (UTC+02:00)		Report		Stadium: INEA Stadion; Attendance: 39,539; Referee: Jarosław Przybył (Kluczbork)

30 September 2016 Match 11	Górnik Łęczna	1–2	Lech Poznań	Lublin
20:30 CEST (UTC+02:00)	Grzelczak 13'	Report	Gajos 70'; Makuszewski 90'	Stadium: Arena Lublin; Attendance: 7,078; Referee: Piotr Lasyk (Bytom)

16 October 2016 Match 12	Lech Poznań	1–1	Wisła Kraków	Poznań
18:00 CEST (UTC+02:00)	Jevtić 69'	Report	Brożek 90+2'	Stadium: INEA Stadion; Attendance: 20,158; Referee: Jarosław Przybył (Kluczbork)

22 October 2016 Match 13	Legia Warsaw	2–1	Lech Poznań	Warsaw
20:30 CEST (UTC+02:00)	Nikolić 64'; Hämäläinen 90+3'	Report	Robak 90' (pen.)	Stadium: Polish Army Stadium; Attendance: 28,842; Referee: Szymon Marciniak (Płock)

29 October 2016 Match 14	Lech Poznań	2–0	Wisła Płock	Poznań
20:30 CEST (UTC+02:00)	Kownacki 9'; Robak 88' (pen.)	Report		Stadium: INEA Stadion; Attendance: 9,591; Referee: Krzysztof Jakubik (Siedlce)

4 November 2016 Match 15	Ruch Chorzów	0–5	Lech Poznań	Chorzów
20:30 CET (UTC+01:00)		Report	Jevtić 37'; Kownacki 41'; Majewski 59'; Robak 67' (pen.); Pawłowski 86'	Stadium: Stadion Miejski; Attendance: 7,269; Referee: Daniel Stefański (Bydgoszcz)

20 November 2016 Match 16	Lech Poznań	3–0	Śląsk Wrocław	Poznań
18:00 CET (UTC+01:00)	Jevtić 16'; Robak 65', 74' (pen.)	Report		Stadium: INEA Stadion; Attendance: 15,943; Referee: Tomasz Musiał (Kraków)

25 November 2016 Match 17	Zagłębie Lubin	0–3	Lech Poznań	Lubin
20:30 CET (UTC+01:00)		Report	Arajuuri 5'; Jevtić 22'; Kownacki 32'	Stadium: Stadion Zagłębia; Attendance: 8,819; Referee: Paweł Gil (Lublin)

4 December 2016 Match 18	Jagiellonia Białystok	2–1	Lech Poznań	Białystok
18:00 CET (UTC+01:00)	Świderski 16'; Černych 63'	Report	Arajuuri 45'	Stadium: Stadion Miejski; Attendance: 10,000; Referee: Daniel Stefański (Bydgoszcz)

11 December 2016 Match 19	Lech Poznań	1–0	Korona Kielce	Poznań
15:30 CET (UTC+01:00)	Kownacki 80'	Report		Stadium: INEA Stadion; Attendance: 12,025; Referee: Krzysztof Jakubik (Siedlce)

17 December 2016 Match 20	Cracovia	1–1	Lech Poznań	Kraków
20:30 CET (UTC+01:00)	Budziński 44'	Report	L. Nielsen 77'	Stadium: Marshal Józef Piłsudski Stadium; Attendance: 8,117; Referee: Szymon Marciniak (Płock)

10 February 2017 Match 21	Lech Poznań	3–0	Bruk-Bet Termalica Nieciecza	Poznań
20:30 CET (UTC+01:00)	Kownacki 33' (pen.); Robak 89' (pen.); Jevtić 90+5' (pen.)	Report		Stadium: INEA Stadion; Attendance: 10,453; Referee: Paweł Gil (Lublin)

18 February 2017 Match 22	Piast Gliwice	0–3	Lech Poznań	Gliwice
20:30 CET (UTC+01:00)		Report	Majewski 28', 35'; Kownacki 62'	Stadium: Stadion Piast; Attendance: 3,875; Referee: Tomasz Kwiatkowski (Warsaw)

24 February 2017 Match 23	Pogoń Szczecin	0–3	Lech Poznań	Szczecin
20:30 CET (UTC+01:00)		Report	Kownacki 3', 36'; Robak 82'	Stadium: Stadion Florian Krygier; Attendance: 8,678; Referee: Daniel Stefański (Bydgoszcz)

5 March 2017 Match 24	Lech Poznań	1–0	Lechia Gdańsk	Poznań
18:00 CET (UTC+01:00)	Majewski 70'	Report		Stadium: INEA Stadion; Attendance: 31,281; Referee: Szymon Marciniak (Płock)

10 March 2017 Match 25	Arka Gdynia	1–4	Lech Poznań	Gdynia
20:30 CET (UTC+01:00)	Siemaszko 53'	Report	Gajos 6'; Jevtić 17'; Kownacki 43'; Robak 79'	Stadium: Stadion GOSiR; Attendance: 11,514; Referee: Jarosław Przybył (Kluczbork)

19 March 2017 Match 26	Lech Poznań	0–0	Górnik Łęczna	Poznań
15:30 CET (UTC+01:00)		Report		Stadium: INEA Stadion; Attendance: 40,324; Referee: Bartosz Frankowski (Toruń)

31 March 2017 Match 27	Wisła Kraków	0–0	Lech Poznań	Kraków
20:30 CEST (UTC+02:00)		Report		Stadium: Stadion Miejski im. Henryka Reymana; Attendance: 30,128; Referee: Paweł Raczkowski (Warsaw)

9 April 2017 Match 28	Lech Poznań	1–2	Legia Warsaw	Poznań
18:00 CEST (UTC+02:00)	Kędziora 82'	Report	Dąbrowski 87'; Hämäläinen 90+4'	Stadium: INEA Stadion; Attendance: 41,026; Referee: Daniel Stefański (Bydgoszcz)

15 April 2017 Match 29	Wisła Płock	0–3	Lech Poznań	Płock
20:30 CEST (UTC+02:00)		Report	Robak 25', 35'; Majewski 52'	Stadium: Kazimierz Górski Stadium; Attendance: 9,750; Referee: Paweł Gil (Lublin)

22 April 2017 Match 30	Lech Poznań	3–0	Ruch Chorzów	Poznań
18:00 CEST (UTC+02:00)	Surma 7' (o.g.); Gajos 41'; Jevtić 62'	Report		Stadium: INEA Stadion; Attendance: 20,114; Referee: Łukasz Bednarek (Koszalin)

==== Championship round ====
===== League table =====
Pos	Team	Pld	W	D	L	GF	GA	GD	Pts	Qualification
1	Legia Warsaw (C)	37	21	10	6	70	31	+39	44	Qualification for the Champions League second qualifying round
2	Jagiellonia Białystok	37	21	8	8	64	39	+25	42 (Note: Regular season record: Jagiellonia 59 pts, Lech 55 pts, Lechia 53 pts.)	Qualification for the Europa League first qualifying round
3	Lech Poznań	37	20	9	8	62	29	+33	42	Qualification for the Europa League first qualifying round
4	Lechia Gdańsk	37	20	8	9	57	37	+20	42	
5	Korona Kielce	37	14	5	18	47	65	−18	28	

Source: Ekstraklasa, 90minut
Rules for classification: 1) Points; 2) Points in regular season; 3) Head-to-head points in regular season; 4) Head-to-head goal difference in regular season; 5) Head-to-head goals scored in regular season; 5) Head-to-head away goals scored in regular season (if only two teams); 7) Goal difference; 8) Goals scored; 9) Fairplay ranking; 10) Play-off (only if needed to decide champion, teams for relegation or teams for UEFA competitions).
(C) Champions

===== Results summary =====
Overall								Home						Away					
Pld	W	D	L	GF	GA	GD	Pts	W	D	L	GF	GA	GD	W	D	L	GF	GA	GD
37	20	9	8	62	29	+33	42	12	4	3	29	12	+17	8	5	5	33	17	+16

Last updated: 5 June 2017.
Source: 90minut.pl

===== Results by round =====
Round	1	2	3	4	5	6	7
Ground	H	A	H	A	H	H	A
Result	W	W	W	L	D	W	D
Position	2	2	2	3	3	3	3

Updated to match(es) played on 5 June 2017. Source: 90minut.pl
A = Away; H = Home; W = Win; D = Draw; L = Loss

===== Matches =====
Win Draw Loss

28 April 2017 Match 31	Lech Poznań	3–2	Korona Kielce	Poznań
20:30 CEST (UTC+02:00)	Jevtić 17'; Robak 42' (pen.), 80' (pen.)	Report	Możdżeń 21'; Kiełb 45' (pen.)	Stadium: INEA Stadion; Attendance: 11,192; Referee: Szymon Marciniak (Płock)

7 May 2017 Match 32	Bruk-Bet Termalica Nieciecza	0–3	Lech Poznań	Nieciecza
15:30 CEST (UTC+02:00)		Report	Răduț 16'; Gutkovskis 71' (o.g.); Majewski 73'	Stadium: Stadion Termaliki Bruk-Bet; Attendance: 4,591; Referee: Jarosław Przybył (Kluczbork)

14 May 2017 Match 33	Lech Poznań	2–0	Pogoń Szczecin	Poznań
15:30 CEST (UTC+02:00)	Robak 36'; Trałka 64'	Report		Stadium: INEA Stadion; Attendance: 15,862; Referee: Piotr Lasyk (Bytom)

17 May 2017 Match 34	Legia Warsaw	2–0	Lech Poznań	Warsaw
20:30 CEST (UTC+02:00)	Odjidja-Ofoe 7'; Kucharczyk 83'	Report		Stadium: Polish Army Stadium; Attendance: 28,820; Referee: Daniel Stefański (Bydgoszcz)

21 May 2017 Match 35	Lech Poznań	0–0	Lechia Gdańsk	Poznań
15:30 CEST (UTC+02:00)		Report		Stadium: INEA Stadion; Attendance: 20,139; Referee: Tomasz Musiał (Kraków)

28 May 2017 Match 36	Lech Poznań	2–1	Wisła Kraków	Poznań
18:00 CEST (UTC+02:00)	Majewski 9'; Makuszewski 21'	Report	Boguski 27'	Stadium: INEA Stadion; Attendance: 19,373; Referee: Mariusz Złotek (Stalowa Wola)

4 June 2017 Match 37	Jagiellonia Białystok	2–2	Lech Poznań	Białystok
18:00 CEST (UTC+02:00)	Góralski 76'; Novikovas 87'	Report	Majewski 11'; Trałka 39'	Stadium: Stadion Miejski; Attendance: 19,084; Referee: Mariusz Złotek (Stalowa Wola)

=== Polish Cup ===
9 August 2016 Round of 32	Podbeskidzie Bielsko-Biała	0–3	Lech Poznań	Bielsko-Biała
19:00 CEST (UTC+02:00)		Report	Kędziora 44'; Bille 63', 86'	Stadium: Stadion Miejski; Attendance: 4,510; Referee: Tomasz Musiał (Kraków)

21 September 2016 Round of 16	Ruch Chorzów	0–3	Lech Poznań	Chorzów
20:45 CEST (UTC+02:00)		Report	Robak 14'; Majewski 30'; Pawłowski 53'	Stadium: Stadion Miejski; Attendance: 4,816; Referee: Bartosz Frankowski (Toruń)

==== Quarterfinals ====
25 October 2016 First Leg	Lech Poznań	1–1	Wisła Kraków	Poznań
20:45 CEST (UTC+02:00)	Kownacki 78'	Report	Brożek 48'	Stadium: INEA Stadion; Attendance: 0 Referee: Tomasz Kwiatkowski (Warsaw)

30 November 2016 Second Leg	Wisła Kraków	2–4 (3–5 agg.)	Lech Poznań	Kraków
20:30 CET (UTC+01:00)	Brlek 51'; Małecki 66'	Report	Robak 21' (pen.); Makuszewski 28'; Jevtić 39'; Majewski 82'	Stadium: Stadion Miejski im. Henryka Reymana; Attendance: 10,507; Referee: Paweł Raczkowski (Warsaw)

==== Semifinals ====
1 March 2017 First Leg	Lech Poznań	3–0	Pogoń Szczecin	Poznań
20:00 CET (UTC+01:00)	Pawłowski 32'; Kownacki 53'; L. Nielsen 66'	Report		Stadium: INEA Stadion; Attendance: 14,537; Referee: Tomasz Kwiatkowski (Warsaw)

5 April 2017 Second Leg	Pogoń Szczecin	0–1 (0–4 agg.)	Lech Poznań	Szczecin
20:45 CEST (UTC+02:00)		Report	Robak 41'	Stadium: Stadion Florian Krygier; Attendance: 4,676; Referee: Zbigniew Dobrynin (Łódź)

==== Final ====
2 May 2017 Final	Lech Poznań	1–2 (a.e.t.)	Arka Gdynia	Warsaw
16:00 CEST (UTC+02:00)	Trałka 119'	Report	Siemaszko 107'; Zarandia 111'	Stadium: PGE Narodowy; Attendance: 43,760; Referee: Tomasz Musiał (Kraków)

=== Polish Super Cup ===
7 July 2016 Polish Super Cup	Legia Warsaw	1–4	Lech Poznań	Warsaw
17:30 CEST (UTC+02:00)	Guilherme 36'	Report	Makuszewski 22'; L. Nielsen 65'; Formella 90+1', 90+3'	Stadium: Polish Army Stadium; Attendance: 15,000; Referee: Krzysztof Jakubik (Siedlce)

== Squad statistics ==
=== Appearances and goals ===
As of

No.	Pos	Player	Ekstraklasa		Polish Cup		Polish Super Cup		Total	
No.	Pos	Player	Apps	Goals	Apps	Goals	Apps	Goals	Apps	Goals
Goalkeepers
1	GK	(Bosnia and Herzegovina) Jasmin Burić	7	0	6	0	1	0	14	0
30	GK	(Slovakia) Matúš Putnocký	30	0	1	0	0	0	31	0
31	GK	(Poland) Bartosz Mrozek	0	0	0	0	0	0	0	0
33	GK	(Poland) Miłosz Mleczko	0	0	0	0	0	0	0	0
Defenders
3	DF	(Denmark) Lasse Nielsen	14+5	1	5	1	1	1	25	3
4	DF	(Poland) Tomasz Kędziora	36	1	7	1	1	0	44	2
15	DF	(Poland) Dariusz Dudka	0	0	0+1	0	0	0	1	0
22	DF	(Ukraine) Volodymyr Kostevych	17	0	2	0	0	0	19	0
26	DF	(Poland) Maciej Wilusz	20	0	3	0	1	0	24	0
27	DF	(Poland) Tymoteusz Puchacz	0+1	0	0	0	0	0	1	0
28	DF	(Poland) Marcin Wasielewski	1+1	0	0+1	0	0	0	3	0
35	DF	(Poland) Jan Bednarek	27	1	7	0	0	0	34	1
44	DF	(Croatia) Elvis Kokalović	0	0	0	0	0	0	0	0
Midfielders
6	MF	(Poland) Łukasz Trałka	29+5	2	6	1	1	0	41	3
8	MF	(Poland) Szymon Pawłowski	16+6	1	4+1	2	1	0	28	3
10	MF	(Switzerland) Darko Jevtić	24+7	8	5+2	1	0	0	38	9
14	MF	(Poland) Maciej Gajos	29+5	4	4+1	0	1	0	40	4
17	MF	(Poland) Maciej Makuszewski	26+7	2	5+2	1	1	1	41	4
18	MF	(Romania) Mihai Răduț	4+9	1	1+2	0	0	0	16	1
21	MF	(Colombia) Víctor Gutiérrez	0	0	0	0	0	0	0	0
55	MF	(Ghana) Abdul Aziz Tetteh	20+6	1	3	0	1	0	30	1
86	MF	(Poland) Radosław Majewski	32+5	8	5+1	2	0+1	0	44	10
Forwards
11	FW	(Poland) Marcin Robak	21+16	18	6	3	0+1	0	44	21
19	FW	(Denmark) Nicki Bille Nielsen	3+5	0	1+1	2	1	0	11	2
24	FW	(Poland) Dawid Kownacki	16+11	9	2+3	2	0	0	32	11
25	FW	(Poland) Paweł Tomczyk	0+4	0	0	0	0	0	4	0
Players away from the club on loan:
2	DF	(Poland) Robert Gumny	5+1	0	1	0	1	0	8	0
20	MF	(Poland) Dariusz Formella	3+8	1	1+1	0	0+1	2	14	3
29	MF	(Poland) Kamil Jóźwiak	0+6	0	0+3	0	0+1	0	10	0
Players who appeared for Lech and left the club during the season:
5	DF	(Hungary) Tamás Kádár	16+1	0	2	0	0	0	19	0
23	DF	(Finland) Paulus Arajuuri	12	2	1	0	0	0	13	2

=== Goalscorers ===
Place	Position	Number	Nation	Name	Ekstraklasa	Polish Cup	Polish Super Cup	Total
1	FW	11	(Poland)	Marcin Robak	18	3	0	21
2	FW	24	(Poland)	Dawid Kownacki	9	2	0	11
3	MF	86	(Poland)	Radosław Majewski	8	2	0	10
4	MF	10	(Switzerland)	Darko Jevtić	8	1	0	9
5	MF	14	(Poland)	Maciej Gajos	4	0	0	4
5	MF	17	(Poland)	Maciej Makuszewski	2	1	1	4
7	DF	3	(Denmark)	Lasse Nielsen	1	1	1	3
7	MF	6	(Poland)	Łukasz Trałka	2	1	0	3
7	MF	8	(Poland)	Szymon Pawłowski	1	2	0	3
7	MF	20	(Poland)	Dariusz Formella	1	0	2	3
11	DF	4	(Poland)	Tomasz Kędziora	1	1	0	2
11	FW	19	(Denmark)	Nicki Bille Nielsen	0	2	0	2
11	DF	23	(Finland)	Paulus Arajuuri	2	0	0	2
14	MF	18	(Romania)	Mihai Răduț	1	0	0	1
14	DF	35	(Poland)	Jan Bednarek	1	0	0	1
14	MF	55	(Ghana)	Abdul Aziz Tetteh	1	0	0	1
Own goal					2	0	0	2
TOTALS					62	16	4	82

=== Clean sheets ===
Place	Number	Nation	Name	Ekstraklasa	Polish Cup	Polish Super Cup	Total
1	30	(Slovakia)	Matúš Putnocký	18	1	–	19
2	1	(Bosnia and Herzegovina)	Jasmin Burić	2	3	0	5
4	31	(Poland)	Bartosz Mrozek	–	–	–	–
4	33	(Poland)	Miłosz Mleczko	–	–	–	–
TOTALS				20	4	0	24

=== Disciplinary record ===
Number	Position	Nation	Name	Ekstraklasa		Polish Cup		Polish Super Cup		Total	
Number	Position	Nation	Name	Booked	Sent off (straight red)	Booked	Sent off (straight red)	Booked	Sent off (straight red)	Booked	Sent off (straight red)
1	GK	(Bosnia and Herzegovina)	Jasmin Burić	0	1	0	0	0	0	0	1
3	DF	(Denmark)	Lasse Nielsen	3	0	0	0	0	0	3	0
4	DF	(Poland)	Tomasz Kędziora	7	0	1	0	0	0	8	0
6	MF	(Poland)	Łukasz Trałka	6	0	1	0	1	0	8	0
8	MF	(Poland)	Szymon Pawłowski	1	0	0	0	0	0	1	0
10	MF	(Switzerland)	Darko Jevtić	1	1	0	0	–		1	1
11	FW	(Poland)	Marcin Robak	3	0	1	0	0	0	4	0
14	MF	(Poland)	Maciej Gajos	3	0	0	0	0	0	3	0
15	DF	(Poland)	Dariusz Dudka	–		0	0	–		0	0
17	MF	(Poland)	Maciej Makuszewski	2	0	0	0	0	0	2	0
18	MF	(Romania)	Mihai Răduț	0	0	–				0	0
21	MF	(Colombia)	Víctor Gutiérrez	–						–	
19	FW	(Denmark)	Nicki Bille Nielsen	1	0	0	0	1	0	2	0
22	DF	(Ukraine)	Volodymyr Kostevych	3	0	–				3	0
24	FW	(Poland)	Dawid Kownacki	2	0	0	0	–		2	0
25	FW	(Poland)	Paweł Tomczyk	0	0	–				0	0
26	DF	(Poland)	Maciej Wilusz	1	0	1	0	0	0	2	0
27	DF	(Poland)	Tymoteusz Puchacz	0	0	–				0	0
28	DF	(Poland)	Marcin Wasielewski	1	0	–				1	0
30	GK	(Slovakia)	Matúš Putnocký	1	0	0	0	–		1	0
31	GK	(Poland)	Bartosz Mrozek	–						–	
33	GK	(Poland)	Miłosz Mleczko	–						–	
35	DF	(Poland)	Jan Bednarek	9	0	0	0	–		9	0
44	DF	(Croatia)	Elvis Kokalović	–						–	
55	MF	(Ghana)	Abdul Aziz Tetteh	6	1	1	0	0	0	7	1
86	MF	(Poland)	Radosław Majewski	1	0	0	0	0	0	1	0
Players away from the club on loan:
2	DF	(Poland)	Robert Gumny	1	0	0	0	0	0	1	0
20	MF	(Poland)	Dariusz Formella	0	0	0	0	0	0	0	0
29	MF	(Poland)	Kamil Jóźwiak	0	0	0	0	0	0	0	0
Players who appeared for Lech and left the club during the season:
5	DF	(Hungary)	Tamás Kádár	3	0	0	0	–		3	0
23	DF	(Finland)	Paulus Arajuuri	4	0	–				4	0
TOTALS				59	3	5	0	2	0	66	3
