= Matúš Putnocký =

Slovak footballer

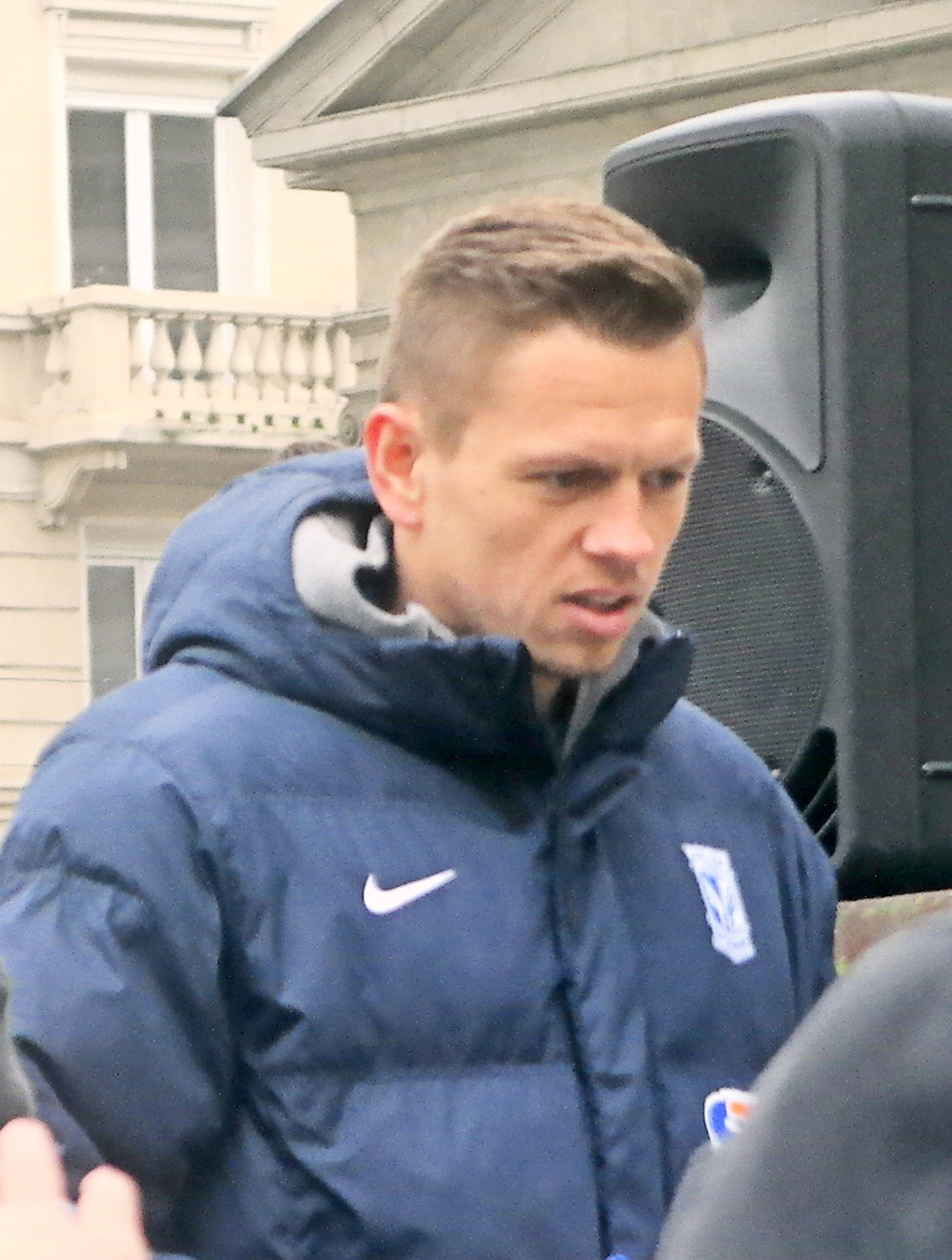

Personal information
- Full name: Matúš Putnocký
- Date of birth: 1 November 1984 (age 42)
- Place of birth: Prešov, Czechoslovakia
- Height: 1.95 m (6 ft 5 in)
- Positions: Goalkeeper; forward

Team information
- Current team: BFC 2018 Bardejov

Youth career
- BŠK Bardejov

Senior career*
Years	Team	Apps	(Gls)
- Steel Trans Ličartovce
2004	→ BŠK Bardejov (loan)		
2005–2006	Košice B		
2006–2009	MFK Košice	80	(0)
2009–2014	Slovan Bratislava	126	(0)
2014	→ Nitra (loan)	12	(0)
2014	→ Ružomberok (loan)	6	(0)
2015–2016	Ruch Chorzów	52	(0)
2016–2019	Lech Poznań	67	(0)
2018–2019	Lech Poznań II	3	(0)
2019–2022	Śląsk Wrocław	65	(0)
2022–2023	Sandecja Nowy Sącz	8	(0)
2023–2024	FC Košice	3	(0)
2024	Partizán Bardejov		
2024–	BFC 2018 Bardejov		
- * Club domestic league appearances and goals as of 30 October 2024

Matúš Putnocký (born 1 November 1984) is a Slovak professional footballer who played his entire career as a goalkeeper, but currently plays as a forward for VII. Liga club BFC 2018 Bardejov. Besides Slovakia, he has played in Poland.

== Club career ==
In May 2016 he signed a three-year contract with Lech Poznań.

== International career ==
In September 2011, Putnocký received his first senior call-up for an UEFA Euro 2012 qualification game against Armenia on 8 September.

== Career statistics ==
As of match played 3 November 2023

Appearances and goals by club, season and competition
Club	Season	League			National cup (Note: Includes Slovak Cup, Polish Cup)		Europe		Other		Total	
Club	Season	Division	Apps	Goals	Apps	Goals	Apps	Goals	Apps	Goals	Apps	Goals
MFK Košice	2005–06	Slovak Super Liga	11	0			—		—		11	0
MFK Košice	2006–07	Slovak Super Liga	12	0	0	0	—		—		12	0
MFK Košice	2007–08	Slovak Super Liga	30	0	6	0	—		—		36	0
MFK Košice	2008–09	Slovak Super Liga	27	0	6	0	—		—		33	0
MFK Košice	Total		80	0	12	0	—		—		92	0
Slovan Bratislava	2009–10	Slovak Super Liga	30	0	4	0	1 (Note: Appearance(s) in UEFA Europa League)	0	—		35	0
Slovan Bratislava	2010–11	Slovak Super Liga	32	0	5	0	4	0	1 (Note: Appearance in Slovak Super Cup)	0	42	0
Slovan Bratislava	2011–12	Slovak Super Liga	16	0	2	0	8 (Note: Four appearances in UEFA Champions League, four appearances in UEFA Europa League)	0	—		26	0
Slovan Bratislava	2012–13	Slovak Super Liga	30	0	0	0	1	0	—		31	0
Slovan Bratislava	2013–14	Slovak Super Liga	18	0	2	0	2 (Note: Appearances in UEFA Champions League)	0	—		22	0
Slovan Bratislava	Total		126	0	13	0	16	0	1	0	156	0
Nitra	2013–14	Slovak Super Liga	12	0	0	0	—		—		12	0
Ružomberok	2014–15	Slovak Super Liga	6	0	0	0	—		—		6	0
Ruch Chorzów	2014–15	Ekstraklasa	18	0	—		—		—		18	0
Ruch Chorzów	2015–16	Ekstraklasa	34	0	0	0	—		—		34	0
Ruch Chorzów	Total		52	0	0	0	—		—		52	0
Lech Poznań	2016–17	Ekstraklasa	30	0	1	0	—		0	0	31	0
Lech Poznań	2017–18	Ekstraklasa	26	0	0	0	5	0	—		31	0
Lech Poznań	2018–19	Ekstraklasa	11	0	1	0	1	0	—		13	0
Lech Poznań	Total		67	0	2	0	6	0	0	0	75	0
Lech Poznań II	2018–19	III liga, gr. III	3	0	—		—		—		3	0
Śląsk Wrocław	2019–20	Ekstraklasa	37	0	0	0	—		—		37	0
Śląsk Wrocław	2020–21	Ekstraklasa	19	0	1	0	—		—		20	0
Śląsk Wrocław	2021–22	Ekstraklasa	9	0	1	0	2 (Note: Appearances in UEFA Europa Conference League)	0	—		12	0
Śląsk Wrocław	Total		65	0	2	0	2	0	—		69	0
Sandecja Nowy Sącz	2022–23	I liga	8	0	2	0	—		—		10	0
FC Košice	2023–24	Slovak Super Liga	3	0	2	0	—		—		5	0
Career total			422	0	33	0	24	0	1	0	480	0

== Honours ==
MFK Košice

- Slovak Cup: 2008–09

ŠK Slovan Bratislava

- Slovak Super Liga: 2010–11, 2012–13, 2013–14
- Slovak Cup: 2009–10, 2010–11, 2012–13

Lech Poznań

- Polish Super Cup: 2016

Lech Poznań II

- III liga, group II: 2018–19

Individual

- Ekstraklasa Goalkeeper of the Season: 2016–17
