= Marcin Robak =

Polish footballer (born 1982)

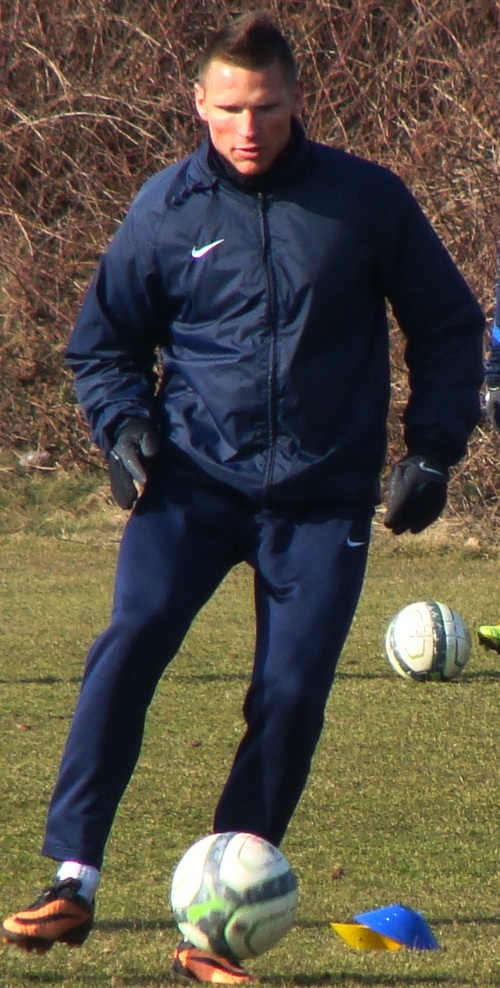
- Robak at Pogoń Szczecin training in 2014

Personal information
- Full name: Marcin Andrzej Robak
- Date of birth: 29 November 1982 (age 43)
- Place of birth: Legnica, Poland
- Height: 1.84 m (6 ft 0 in)
- Position: Forward

Team information
- Current team: FC Toruń
- Number: 99

Senior career*
Years	Team	Apps	(Gls)
2000–2002	Konfeks Legnica	8	(1)
2002–2005	Miedź Legnica	33	(12)
2006–2008	Korona Kielce	66	(19)
2008–2010	Widzew Łódź	73	(45)
2011–2012	Konyaspor	50	(12)
2012–2013	Mersin İdmanyurdu	0	(0)
2013	Piast Gliwice	14	(5)
2013–2015	Pogoń Szczecin	49	(32)
2015–2017	Lech Poznań	45	(20)
2017–2019	Śląsk Wrocław	68	(37)
2019–2021	Widzew Łódź	63	(28)
2025–	FC Toruń (futsal)	3	(0)

International career
2010–2014	Poland	9	(1)
- * Club domestic league appearances and goals as of 14:36, 17 March 2025 (UTC)

Marcin Andrzej Robak (born 29 November 1982) is a Polish professional futsal player who plays for Ekstraklasa club FC Toruń. A former professional footballer who played as a forward, he made nine appearances and scored once for the Poland national team between 2010 and 2014.

== Club career ==
Robak's first club in Ekstraklasa was Korona Kielce, where he made his debut on 25 March 2006. In the next season, he became the first striker of Korona and scored ten goals in the 2007–08 season.

He moved from Korona to Widzew Łódź in the next season and was one of the best strikers in I liga, scoring 20 goals in his first season with the club. Widzew, with Robak on board, won promotion to Ekstraklasa the next season, and the in-form Robak received a call-up to the Poland national team.

In the middle of the 2010–11 season, he moved to Konyaspor in Turkey. After the club was relegated in the 2011–12 season, he moved to Mersin İdmanyurdu, where he played just for the half of the season.

Robak returned to Poland and signed a contract with Piast Gliwice. On 13 August 2013, Robak moved to Pogoń Szczecin and was the top goalscorer in Ekstraklasa with 22 goals in the 2013–14 season. His last season in Pogoń was full of injuries and Robak only managed 17 leagues appearances.

Before the 2015–16 season, he moved to defending champions Lech Poznań on a two-year contract. In the 2016–17 season, he scored 18 league goals and for the second time was crowned the top scorer in Ekstraklasa, alongside Marco Paixão.

In 2017, he signed a contract with Śląsk Wrocław. On 30 April 2018, Robak scored his 100th goal in Ekstraklasa.

In the 2019–20 season, Robak made a surprise return to Widzew, at the time playing in the Polish third division. The team managed to win a promotion with him as team captain. Robak left the club in the summer of 2021. In December 2022, Robak announced his retirement from professional football.

On 18 February 2025, Robak began his career in futsal, joining Polish top division club FC Toruń on a deal until the end of the season.

== Career statistics ==
=== Club ===
Appearances and goals by club, season and competition
Club	Season	League			National cup (Note: Includes Polish Cup, Turkish Cup)		Europe		Other		Total	
Club	Season	Division	Apps	Goals	Apps	Goals	Apps	Goals	Apps	Goals	Apps	Goals
Korona Kielce	2005–06	Ekstraklasa	10	2	3	0	—		—		13	2
Korona Kielce	2006–07	Ekstraklasa	28	7	7	3	—		6 (Note: Appearances in Ekstraklasa Cup)	2	41	12
Korona Kielce	2007–08	Ekstraklasa	28	10	1	0	—		2	1	31	11
Korona Kielce	Total		66	19	11	3	—		8	3	85	25
Widzew Łódź	2008–09	I liga	30	20	1	0	—		—		31	20
Widzew Łódź	2009–10	I liga	33	18	1	0	—		—		34	18
Widzew Łódź	2010–11	Ekstraklasa	10	7	1	0	—		—		11	7
Widzew Łódź	Total		73	45	3	0	—		—		76	45
Konyaspor	2010–11	Süper Lig	16	4	—		—		—		16	4
Konyaspor	2011–12	TFF First League	34	8	0	0	—		—		34	8
Konyaspor	Total		50	12	0	0	—		—		50	12
Mersin İdmanyurdu	2012–13	Süper Lig	0	0	2	0	—		—		2	0
Piast Gliwice	2012–13	Ekstraklasa	11	4	—		—		—		11	4
Piast Gliwice	2013–14	Ekstraklasa	3	1	—		2 (Note: Appearance(s) in UEFA Europa League)	2	—		5	3
Piast Gliwice	Total		14	5	—		2	2	—		16	7
Pogoń Szczecin	2013–14	Ekstraklasa	32	21	1	1	—		—		33	22
Pogoń Szczecin	2014–15	Ekstraklasa	17	11	1	1	—		—		18	12
Pogoń Szczecin	Total		49	32	2	2	—		—		51	34
Lech Poznań	2015–16	Ekstraklasa	8	2	1	0	3 (Note: Two appearances in UEFA Champions League, one appearance in UEFA Europa League)	0	1 (Note: Appearance in Polish Super Cup)	0	13	2
Lech Poznań	2016–17	Ekstraklasa	37	18	6	3	—		1	0	44	21
Lech Poznań	2017–18	Ekstraklasa	0	0	0	0	1	0	—		1	0
Lech Poznań	Total		45	20	7	3	4	0	2	0	58	23
Śląsk Wrocław	2017–18	Ekstraklasa	33	19	1	0	—		—		34	19
Śląsk Wrocław	2018–19	Ekstraklasa	35	18	2	0	—		—		37	18
Śląsk Wrocław	Total		68	37	3	0	—		—		71	37
Widzew Łódź	2019–20	II liga	33	21	2	3	—		—		35	24
Widzew Łódź	2020–21	I liga	30	7	1	0	—		—		31	7
Widzew Łódź	Total		63	28	3	3	—		—		66	31
Career total			428	198	31	11	6	2	10	3	485	214

=== International ===
Appearances and goals by national team and year
National team	Year	Apps	Goals
Poland	2010	4	1
Poland	2013	3	0
Poland	2014	2	0
Total		9	1

Score and result list Poland's goal tally first, score column indicates score after Robak goal.

International goal scored by Marcin Robak
No.	Date	Venue	Opponent	Score	Result	Competition
1	20 January 2010	Nakhon Ratchasima, Thailand	Thailand	3–0	3–1	Friendly

== Honours ==
Widzew Łódź

- I liga: 2008–09, 2009–10

Lech Poznań

- Polish Super Cup: 2015, 2016

Individual

- Ekstraklasa top scorer: 2013–14, 2016–17
- I liga top scorer: 2009–10
- Ekstraklasa Forward of the Season: 2013–14, 2016–17
- Ekstraklasa Player of the Month: September 2017
- I liga Player of the Year: 2008
