= Nicki Bille Nielsen =

Danish footballer (born 1988)

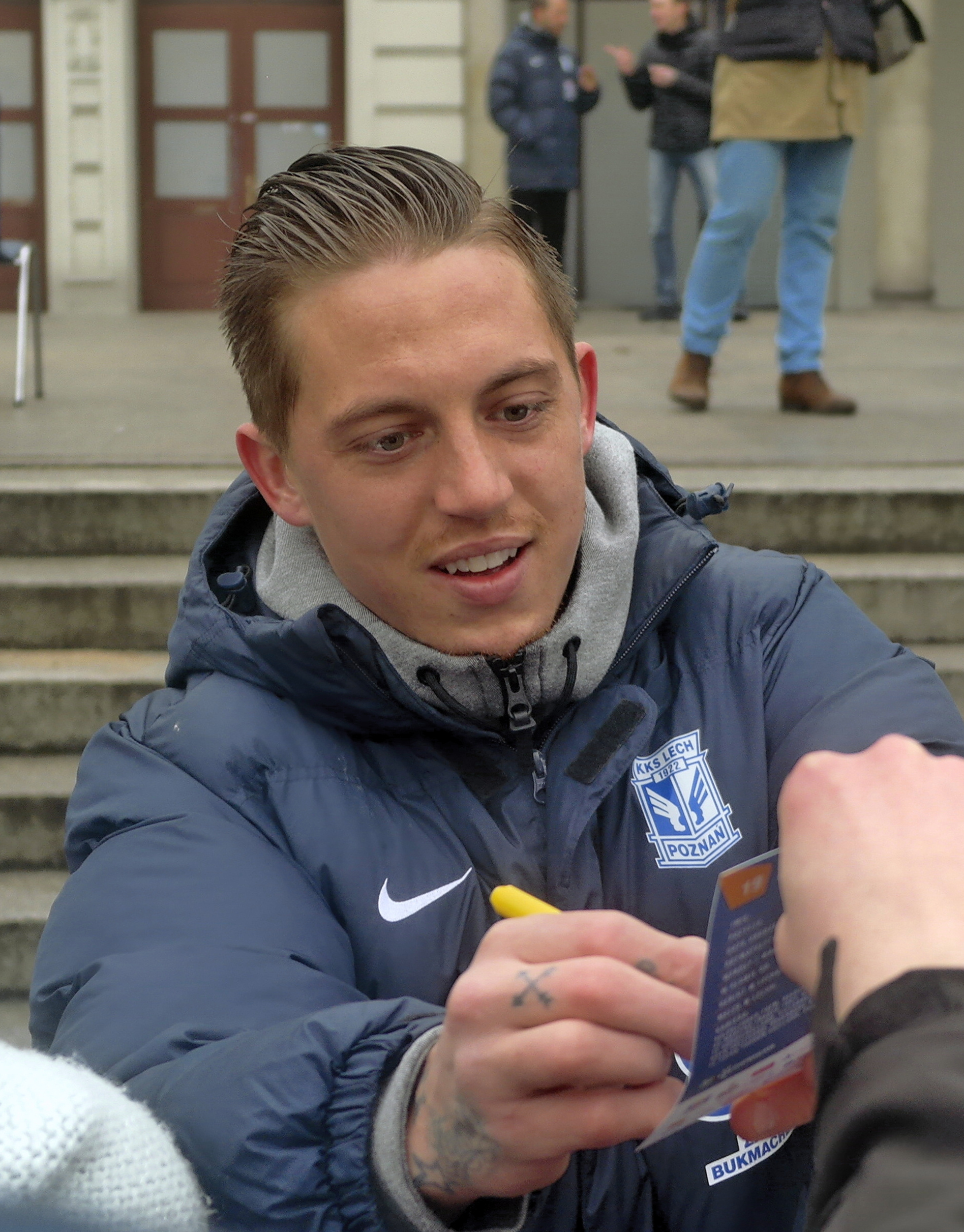
- Nicki Bille Nielsen in 2017

Personal information
- Full name: Nicki Niels Bille Nielsen
- Date of birth: 7 February 1988 (age 38)
- Place of birth: Vigerslev, Denmark
- Height: 1.85 m (6 ft 1 in)
- Position: Forward

Youth career
- 1993–1995: BK Hellas
- 1995–1997: Rikken
- 1997–1999: KB
- 1999–2005: Frem

Senior career*
Years	Team	Apps	(Gls)
2005–2006	Frem	35	(3)
2006–2008	Reggina	7	(0)
2007	→ Martina (loan)	14	(2)
2008	→ Lucchese (loan)	5	(0)
2008–2010	FC Nordsjælland	58	(18)
2010–2011	Villarreal B	33	(6)
2011–2013	Villarreal	1	(0)
2011–2012	→ Elche (loan)	35	(12)
2012	→ Rayo Vallecano (loan)	9	(0)
2013–2014	Rosenborg	38	(11)
2014–2015	Evian	19	(1)
2015	Evian B	4	(4)
2015	Esbjerg fB	17	(5)
2016–2018	Lech Poznań	32	(4)
2018	Panionios	5	(0)
2018	Lyngby	3	(1)
2019	Ishøj	0	(0)
2020–2021	VB 1968		

International career
2005–2006	Denmark U18	4	(0)
2006–2007	Denmark U19	9	(3)
2006–2008	Denmark U20	6	(2)
2007–2010	Denmark U21	17	(8)
2013	Denmark	3	(1)
- * Club domestic league appearances and goals as of 24 October 2018

Nicki Niels Bille Nielsen (born 7 February 1988) is a Danish former professional footballer who played as a forward.

He has played for various Danish national youth teams, including 17 games and 8 goals for the Denmark national under-21 football team.

== Club career ==
Bille Nielsen started his senior career with Danish 1st Division club BK Frem. He was promoted to the first-team in the summer 2005, and made his debut on 31 July 2005 against Fremad Amager. He signed a two-year contract with Frem in October 2005, and was on trial with English club Newcastle United in November 2005, and also had a trial with Portsmouth F.C. Though he never secured himself in the Frem starting line-up, Bille played a total 38 senior games and scored four goals for the club until August 2006.

In September 2006, he moved abroad to play for Italian club Reggina Calcio in the Serie A championship, under manager Walter Mazzarri. He scored in his debut game for Reggina, a Coppa Italia game on 8 November. He got his Serie A debut on 19 November, and played seven games during the 2006–07 Serie A season without scoring any goals. He also played for Reggina's youth team, helping them advance in the 2007 Campionato Nazionale Primavera by scoring two goals in two games against A.C. Milan Primavera. Under new manager Massimo Ficcadenti, Bille had a difficult time securing a place in the starting eleven, and he underwent loan deals with Serie C1 teams A.C. Martina and A.S. Lucchese-Libertas. Both clubs went bankrupt during his stays, and according to his agent Bille did not get his wage from Reggina either. In August 2008, Bille agreed to rescind all claims of the wages owed to him, in order for his contract to be terminated a year before its expiration. He brought with him an eight match-day suspension incurred following a red card for laying his hand on the referee in a May 2008 youth team game for Lucchese.

He moved back to Denmark, and trained with Danish Superliga team FC Nordsjælland in August 2008. On 18 September the Danish Football Association ruled that in order to help him re-establish his career, Bille's eight-day suspension would expire from the ninth match day of the 2008–09 Danish Superliga season even though he had not been signed by any club, making him available for selection from the start of October. He signed a contract with Nordsjælland on 25 September, and made his debut in October. He played 10 games in his first season with Nordsjælland, as he was backup for Martin Bernburg. As Bernburg was sold, Bille got his breakthrough in the 2009–10 Danish Superliga season, when he played 32 of 33 games and scored eight goals. He was also a part of the Nordsjælland team which won the 2010 Danish Cup. Nicki Bille gained his first team debut 5 February 2011 in a home fixture against Levante FC, Villarreal CF lost the game 0–1. He was loaned out to Rayo Vallecano for the 2012–2013 La Liga season.

On 3 January 2013 he signed a four-year deal with Norwegian side Rosenborg after ending his stay at Rayo Vallecano earlier than planned. Billie Nielsen changed from number 9 to his favorite number 14 before the 2014 season.

In 2014, Rosenborg sold Nielsen for an undisclosed amount to the French club Evian Thonon Gaillard F.C. During his Rosenborg career, he had scored 24 goals in 50 games.

On 1 July 2015, he signed a three-year contract with Esbjerg fB, but his time at Esbjerg was never a success. He left half a year after signing with the club having played 19 games and scored five goals.

On 27 January 2016, he signed a 2.5-year contract with an option of one additional year with Polish champion Lech Poznań. He was given shirt number 19 after the former topscorer Kasper Hämäläinen. Bille got an injury in February 2016 in a match against Podbeskidzie Bielsko-Biała, where he only played 25 minutes before leaving the pitch. He was out for 1 month .

In August 2016, Bille suffered an injury in his groin that kept him out for the next seven months. On 30 January 2018, Panionios F.C. officially announced the purchase of experienced Danish international striker Nicki Niels Bille Nielsen from Lech Poznań, for an undisclosed fee.

In July 2018 he signed a contract with Lyngby Boldklub, who was managed by Bille's former youth coach Mark Strudal. On 26 October 2018 he was sacked from Lyngby following an episode, where he was arrested and charged by the Copenhagen Police Department.

On 25 July 2019, Bille joined Ishøj IF in the Denmark Series – the 4th tier of Danish football. He was released without making an appearance, on 20 November 2019. In June 2020 he joined VB 1968 in the Zealand Series, the fifth tier of Danish football. At VB 1968 he joined several other former professional footballers such as Martin Albrechtsen, Quincy Antipas and Nabil Aslam.

== International career ==
Bille got his international debut for the Denmark national under-18 football team in September 2005, and played four games for the team until February 2006. He was called up for the Danish under-20 national team for the 2006 Milk Cup in August, as a replacement for the injured Nicklas Pedersen, and scored one goal in two games at the tournament. From September 2006 to June 2007, he scored three goals in nine matches for the Danish U19 team. He was again included in the U20 squad for the 2007 Milk Cup, scoring one goal in three games.

After his loan to Martina, he was called up for the Denmark national under-21 football team to replace the injured Bo Storm, and made his under-21 debut in September 2007. He was not called up again before he moved to FC Nordsjælland. In November 2008, Bille played his sixth and last under-20 international game. He rejoined the under-21 team in January 2009, and established himself in the team. In May 2010, he joined the under-21 team for a series of unofficial games at the international 2010 Toulon Tournament. He scored five goals in four appearances, becoming the top scorer of the tournament and helping Denmark finish runners-up.

== Personal life ==
Besides being a former professional football player, Nielsen is a criminal with several convictions. Bille Nielsen's cousin is Daniel Wass.

In the early hours of 27 September 2013, Nielsen was arrested by Norwegian police in Trondheim after a series of incidents at two pubs. He was detained overnight and subsequently given a fine in lieu of prosecution of 10000 kr for disturbing the peace.

On 8 July 2014, Nielsen was charged by Danish authorities with committing violence against police officers during an incident in Copenhagen during Easter 2014 when he was approached by police after allegedly conducting acts of vandalism. The charges led to Rosenborg banning Nielsen from several days of training. Nielsen denied all charges by the Danish authorities.

On 15 June 2018, Nielsen was sentenced to one month in jail in Monaco, for hitting a woman who tried to stop him from choking her friend outside a nightclub. He was also convicted for possessing cocaine and for publicly having recorded himself and other individuals in sexual relations, on his cellphone.

On 22 October 2018, he was arrested on Strøget in Central Copenhagen and charged with making threats of violence including threatening to fire his airgun at another individual. This led to him being sacked by Lyngby Boldklub who had publicly stated that they gave the striker a chance to redeem his career and get his life back on track, when they offered him a contract.

On 25 December 2018, Nielsen was seriously injured in the right arm, when three people entered his flat in the Sydhavnen District of Copenhagen and shot him with a shotgun.

== Career statistics ==
=== Club ===
As of 24 October 2018.

Appearances and goals by club, season and competition
Club	Season	League			National cup (Note: Includes Copa del Rey, Norwegian Cup, Coupe de France, Polish Cup, Greek Cup)		Europe		Other		Total	
Club	Season	Division	Apps	Goals	Apps	Goals	Apps	Goals	Apps	Goals	Apps	Goals
Nordsjælland	2008–09	Danish Superliga	10	0	?	?	—		0	0	10	0
Nordsjælland	2009–10	Danish Superliga	32	8	?	?	—		—		32	8
Nordsjælland	2010–11	Danish Superliga	6	2	?	?	2 (Note: Appearances in UEFA Europa League)	0	—		8	2
Nordsjælland	Total		48	10	?	?	2	0	—		50	10
Villarreal B	2010–11	Segunda División	33	5	—		—		—		33	5
Villarreal	2010–11	La Liga	1	0	0	0	0	0	0	0	1	0
Elche	2011–12	Segunda División	37	11	1	0	—		—		38	11
Rayo Vallecano	2012–13	La Liga	9	0	2	0	—		—		11	0
Rosenborg	2013	Tippeligaen	27	8	7	8	3	0	—		37	16
Rosenborg	2014	Tippeligaen	11	3	2	5	0	0	—		13	8
Rosenborg	Total		38	11	9	13	3	0	—		50	24
Evian	2014–15	Ligue 1	19	1	2	1	—		1 (Note: Appearance in Coupe de la Ligue)	0	22	2
Esbjerg fB	2015–16	Danish Superliga	17	5	0	0	—		—		17	5
Lech Poznań	2015–16	Ekstraklasa	10	3	2	0	—		—		12	3
Lech Poznań	2016–17	Ekstraklasa	8	0	2	2	—		1 (Note: Appearance in Polish Super Cup)	0	11	2
Lech Poznań	2017–18	Ekstraklasa	14	1	1	0	5	2	—		20	3
Lech Poznań	Total		32	4	5	2	5	2	1	0	43	8
Panionios	2017–18	Super League Greece	5	0	1	0	—		—		6	0
Lyngby BK	2018–19	Danish 1st Division	3	1	0	0	—		2	1	5	2
Career total			242	48	20	16	10	2	4	1	276	67

=== International ===
Appearances and goals by national team and year
National team	Year	Apps	Goals
Denmark
Denmark	2013	3	1
Total		3	1

Scores and results list Denmark's goal tally first, score column indicates score after each Nielsen goal.

List of international goals scored by Nicki Bille Nielsen
No.	Date	Venue	Opponent	Score	Result	Competition
1	15 October 2013	Parken Stadium, Copenhagen	Malta	6–0	6–0	2014 World Cup qualification

== Honours ==
FC Nordsjælland

- Danish Cup: 2009–10, 2010–11

Lech Poznań

- Polish Super Cup: 2016
