= Maciej Wilusz =

Polish footballer

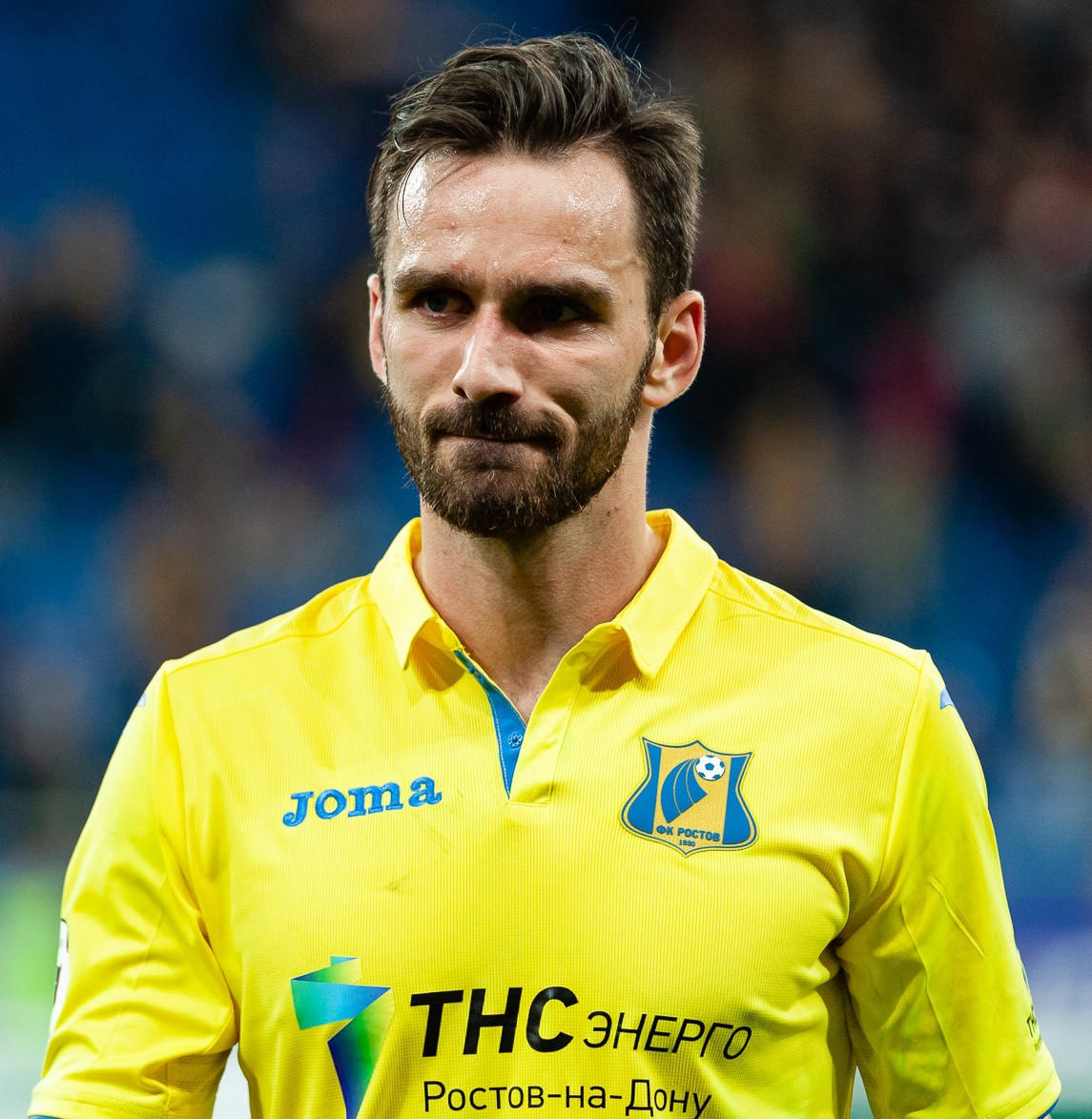
- Wilusz with Rostov in 2018

Personal information
- Date of birth: 25 September 1988 (age 38)
- Place of birth: Wrocław, Poland
- Height: 1.90 m (6 ft 3 in)
- Position: Centre-back

Team information
- Current team: Lech Poznań II (assistant)

Youth career
- Śląsk Wrocław

Senior career*
Years	Team	Apps	(Gls)
2007	SC Heerenveen	0	(0)
2008	Sparta Rotterdam	0	(0)
2009	→ RBC Roosendaal (loan)	0	(0)
2010–2012	MKS Kluczbork	39	(0)
2012–2014	GKS Bełchatów	63	(3)
2014–2017	Lech Poznań	34	(0)
2015–2016	Lech Poznań II	7	(1)
2015	→ Korona Kielce (loan)	13	(0)
2017–2020	Rostov	42	(1)
2020	Ural Yekaterinburg	8	(0)
2020–2021	Raków Częstochowa	11	(0)
2021	→ Śląsk Wrocław (loan)	0	(0)
Total		217	(5)

International career
2014	Poland	4	(0)

Managerial career
- 2026: Lech Poznań II
- * Club domestic league appearances and goals

Maciej Wilusz (born 25 September 1988) is a Polish professional football manager and former player who played as a centre-back. He is currently the assistant manager of III liga club Lech Poznań II.

== Club career ==
On 8 June 2017, Wilusz signed a three-year contract with the Russian Premier League club Rostov. His contract was terminated by mutual consent on 15 January 2020.

On 16 January 2020, he moved to fellow Russian top-tier club Ural Yekaterinburg.

== International career ==
In 2014, Wilusz was called up by the Poland national coach Adam Nawałka to the Poland national team. His debut came on 18 January 2014 in a 3–0 win in a friendly against Norway. He was called up again in March 2014 for the match against Scotland.

== Career statistics ==
=== Club ===
Appearances and goals by club, season and competition
Club	Season	League			National cup (Note: Includes Polish Cup, Russian Cup)		Europe		Other		Total	
Club	Season	Division	Apps	Goals	Apps	Goals	Apps	Goals	Apps	Goals	Apps	Goals
MKS Kluczbork	2010–11	I liga	19	0	1	0	—		—		20	0
MKS Kluczbork	2011–12	II liga	20	0	3	0	—		—		23	0
MKS Kluczbork	Total		39	0	4	0	—		—		43	0
GKS Bełchatów	2011–12	Ekstraklasa	10	0	—		—		—		10	0
GKS Bełchatów	2012–13	Ekstraklasa	23	0	1	0	—		—		24	0
GKS Bełchatów	2013–14	I liga	30	3	1	0	—		—		31	3
GKS Bełchatów	Total		63	3	2	0	—		—		65	3
Lech Poznań	2014–15	Ekstraklasa	8	0	0	0	1 (Note: Appearance in UEFA Europa League)	0	—		9	0
Lech Poznań	2015–16	Ekstraklasa	6	0	2	0	0	0	0	0	8	0
Lech Poznań	2016–17	Ekstraklasa	20	0	3	0	—		1 (Note: Appearance in Polish Super Cup)	0	24	0
Lech Poznań	Total		34	0	5	0	1	0	1	0	41	0
Lech Poznań II	2014–15	III liga, group II	6	1	—		—		—		6	1
Lech Poznań II	2016–17	III liga, group II	1	0	—		—		—		1	0
Lech Poznań II	Total		7	1	—		—		—		7	1
Korona Kielce (loan)	2015–16	Ekstraklasa	13	0	0	0	—		—		13	0
Rostov	2017–18	Russian Premier League	26	1	1	0	—		—		27	1
Rostov	2018–19	Russian Premier League	16	0	1	0	—		—		17	0
Rostov	2019–20	Russian Premier League	0	0	2	0	—		—		2	0
Rostov	Total		44	1	4	0	—		—		46	1
Ural Yekaterinburg	2019–20	Russian Premier League	8	0	1	0	—		—		9	0
Raków Częstochowa	2020–21	Ekstraklasa	10	0	0	0	—		—		10	0
Raków Częstochowa	2021–22	Ekstraklasa	1	0	0	0	1 (Note: Appearance in UEFA Europa Conference League)	0	0	0	2	0
Raków Częstochowa	Total		11	0	0	0	1	0	0	0	12	0
Śląsk Wrocław (loan)	2020–21	Ekstraklasa	0	0	—		—		—		0	0
Career total			217	5	16	0	2	0	1	0	236	5

=== International ===
Appearances and goals by national team and year
National team	Year	Apps	Goals
Poland	2014	4	0
Total		4	0

== Managerial statistics ==
As of match played 30 May 2026

Managerial record by team and tenure
Team	From	To	Record							
Team	From	To	G	W	D	L	GF	GA	GD	Win %
Lech Poznań II	7 April 2026	13 July 2026	10	3	2	5	19	21	−2	30.00
Total			10	3	2	5	19	21	−2	30.00

== Honours ==
GKS Bełchatów

- I liga: 2013–14

Lech Poznań

- Ekstraklasa: 2014–15
- Polish Super Cup: 2016
