= Kamil Jóźwiak =

Polish footballer (born 1998)

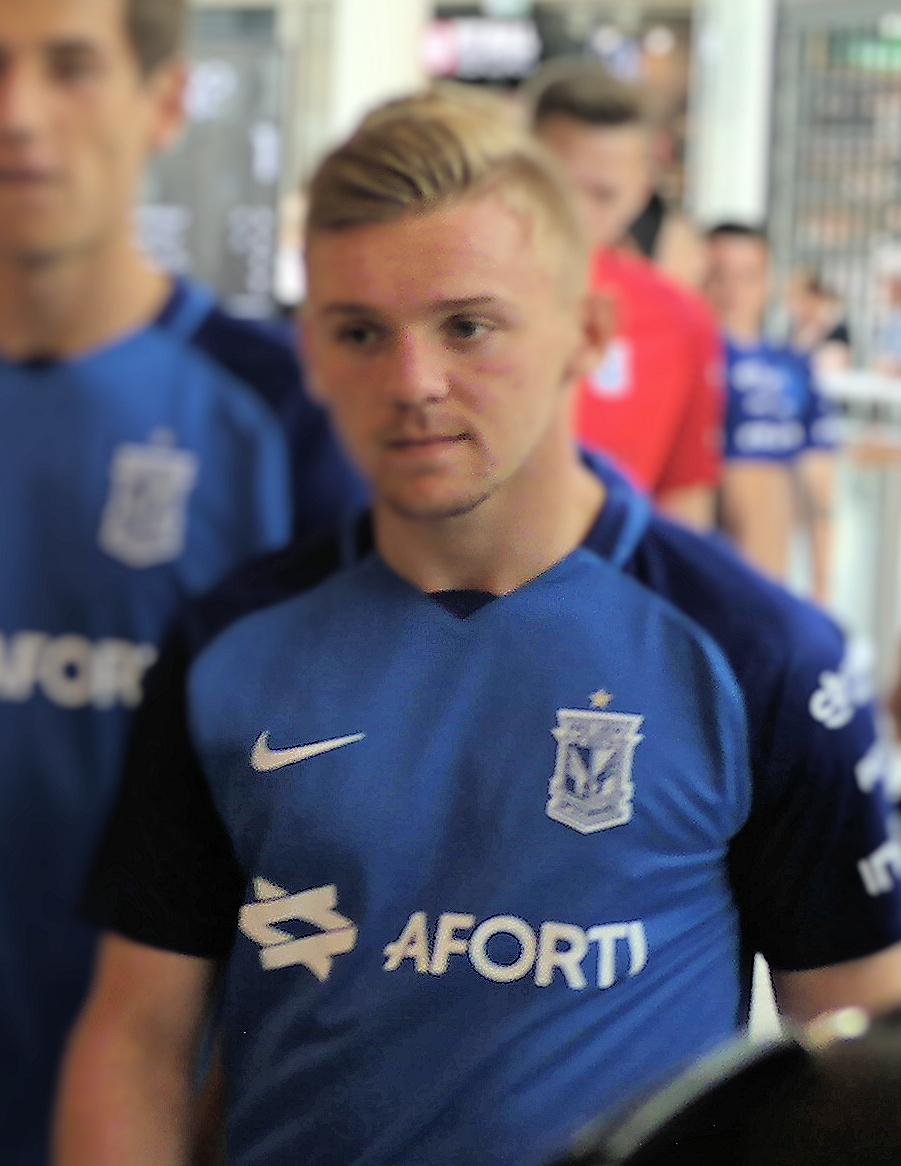
- Jóźwiak with Lech Poznań in 2017

Personal information
- Full name: Kamil Jan Jóźwiak
- Date of birth: 22 April 1998 (age 28)
- Place of birth: Międzyrzecz, Poland
- Height: 1.76 m (5 ft 9 in)
- Position: Winger

Team information
- Current team: Jagiellonia Białystok
- Number: 72

Youth career
- 2005–2007: Junior Zbąszynek
- 2007–2011: UKP Zielona Góra
- 2011–2014: Lech Poznań

Senior career*
Years	Team	Apps	(Gls)
2014–2019	Lech Poznań II	28	(5)
2016–2020	Lech Poznań	104	(15)
2016–2017	→ GKS Katowice (loan)	12	(2)
2020–2022	Derby County	58	(1)
2022–2023	Charlotte FC	44	(2)
2024–2025	Granada	28	(0)
2025–	Jagiellonia Białystok	17	(0)
2026	Jagiellonia Białystok II	1	(0)

International career
2013	Poland U16	2	(0)
2014–2015	Poland U17	13	(1)
2015	Poland U18	2	(0)
2015–2017	Poland U19	19	(1)
2017	Poland U20	1	(0)
2018–2019	Poland U21	14	(1)
2019–2021	Poland	22	(3)
- * Club domestic league appearances and goals as of 21:26, 15 October 2026 (UTC)

Kamil Jan Jóźwiak (born 22 April 1998) is a Polish professional footballer who plays as a winger for Ekstraklasa club Jagiellonia Białystok. He began his professional career in his home country with Lech Poznań, from whom he joined Derby County in 2020.

== Club career ==
Jóźwiak debuted for Lech Poznań on 28 February 2016 in 0–2 loss against Jagiellonia Białystok. He was loaned to GKS Katowice in 2017.

Jóźwiak signed for Derby County on 16 September 2020. He scored his first goal for the club in a 2–0 win against Swansea City on 16 December 2020.

On 11 March 2022, Jóźwiak signed a three-year deal with Major League Soccer side Charlotte FC for an undisclosed transfer fee.

On 1 February 2024, he moved back to Europe and joined La Liga side Granada on an eighteen-month deal.

On 11 September 2025, Jóźwiak joined Ekstraklasa club Jagiellonia Białystok on a two-year deal, with an option for a third year.

== International career ==
On 19 November 2019, Jóźwiak debuted for the Polish senior squad during a UEFA Euro 2020 qualifying Group G match against Slovenia, replacing Sebastian Szymański in the 86th minute. He later started every game in the 2020–21 UEFA Nations League, recording a goal and an assist over six matches.

Jóźwiak was named in the final 23-man Polish squad for the rescheduled UEFA Euro 2020, playing all three matches as a starter until Poland exited the group stage. He registered an assist to Robert Lewandowski's second-half goal in a 1–1 draw with Spain.

== Career statistics ==
=== Club ===
As of match played 15 October 2026

Appearances and goals by club, season and competition
Club	Season	League			National cup (Note: Includes Polish Cup, FA Cup, U.S. Open Cup, Copa del Rey)		Continental		Other		Total	
Club	Season	Division	Apps	Goals	Apps	Goals	Apps	Goals	Apps	Goals	Apps	Goals
Lech Poznań II	2014–15	III liga, group C	5	0	—		—		—		5	0
Lech Poznań II	2015–16	III liga, group C	13	2	—		—		—		13	2
Lech Poznań II	2016–17	III liga, group II	7	3	—		—		—		7	3
Lech Poznań II	2017–18	III liga, group II	2	0	—		—		—		2	0
Lech Poznań II	2018–19	III liga, group II	1	0	—		—		—		1	0
Lech Poznań II	Total		28	5	—		—		—		28	5
Lech Poznań	2015–16	Ekstraklasa	10	1	3	0	—		—		13	1
Lech Poznań	2016–17	Ekstraklasa	6	0	3	0	—		1 (Note: Appearance in Polish Super Cup)	0	10	0
Lech Poznań	2017–18	Ekstraklasa	20	3	1	0	1 (Note: Appearance(s) in UEFA Europa League)	1	—		22	4
Lech Poznań	2018–19	Ekstraklasa	31	3	2	0	2	0	—		35	3
Lech Poznań	2019–20	Ekstraklasa	35	8	4	1	—		—		39	9
Lech Poznań	2020–21	Ekstraklasa	2	0	1	0	1	0	—		4	0
Lech Poznań	Total		104	15	14	1	4	1	1	0	123	17
GKS Katowice (loan)	2016–17	I liga	12	2	—		—		—		12	2
Derby County	2020–21	Championship	41	1	0	0	—		0	0	41	1
Derby County	2021–22	Championship	17	0	1	0	—		2 (Note: Appearances in EFL Cup)	0	20	0
Derby County	Total		58	1	1	0	—		2	0	61	1
Charlotte FC	2022	Major League Soccer	19	0	3	0	—		—		22	0
Charlotte FC	2023	Major League Soccer	25	2	3	2	—		6 (Note: One appearances in MLS Cup playoffs, five appearances in Leagues Cup)	0	34	4
Charlotte FC	Total		44	2	6	2	—		6	0	56	4
Granada	2023–24	La Liga	11	0	—		—		—		11	0
Granada	2024–25	Segunda División	17	0	3	0	—		—		20	0
Granada	Total		28	0	3	0	—		—		31	0
Jagiellonia Białystok	2025–26	Ekstraklasa	13	0	2	0	2 (Note: Appearances in UEFA Conference League)	0	—		17	0
Jagiellonia Białystok	2026–27	Ekstraklasa	4	0	0	0	1	0	—		5	0
Jagiellonia Białystok	Total		17	0	2	0	3	0	—		22	0
Jagiellonia Białystok II	2025–26	III liga, gr. I	1	0	—		—		—		1	0
Career total			292	25	26	3	7	1	9	0	334	29

=== International ===
Appearances and goals by national team and year
National team	Year	Apps	Goals
Poland
Poland	2019	1	0
Poland	2020	8	1
Poland	2021	13	2
Total		22	3

Scores and results list Poland's goal tally first, score column indicates score after each Jóźwiak goal.

List of international goals scored by Kamil Jóźwiak
No.	Date	Venue	Opponent	Score	Result	Competition
1	18 November 2020	Silesian Stadium, Chorzów, Poland	Netherlands	1–0	1–2	2020–21 UEFA Nations League A
2	25 March 2021	Puskás Aréna, Budapest, Hungary	Hungary	2–2	3–3	2022 FIFA World Cup qualification
3	12 November 2021	Estadi Nacional, Andorra La Vella, Andorra	Andorra	2–0	4–1	2022 FIFA World Cup qualification

== Honours ==
Lech Poznań

- Polish Super Cup: 2016

Lech Poznań II

- III liga, group II: 2018–19

Individual

- Ekstraklasa Young Player of the Month: February 2020
