= Maciej Makuszewski =

Polish footballer

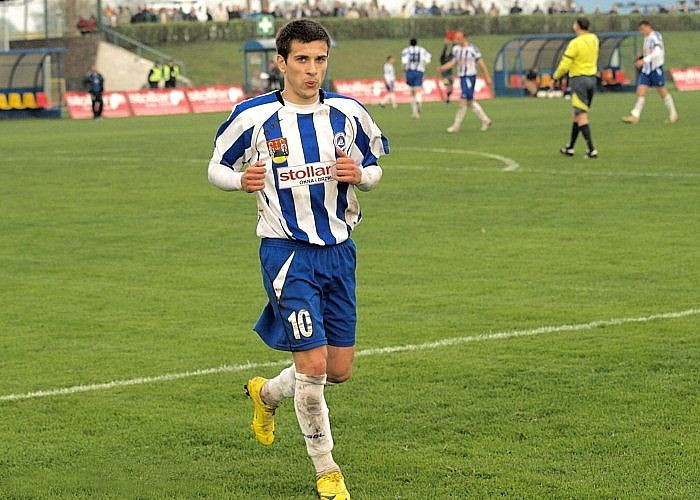
- Makuszewski with Wigry Suwałki in 2010

Personal information
- Date of birth: 29 September 1989 (age 37)
- Place of birth: Grajewo, Poland
- Height: 1.76 m (5 ft 9 1/2 in)
- Position: Winger

Team information
- Current team: Mazur Radzymin
- Number: 10

Youth career
- Wissa Szczuczyn
- 2002–2007: UKS SMS Łódź

Senior career*
Years	Team	Apps	(Gls)
2007–2008	UKS SMS Łódź	27	(5)
2008–2010	Wigry Suwałki	60	(11)
2010–2012	Jagiellonia Białystok	41	(5)
2012–2014	Terek Grozny	14	(0)
2014	→ Lechia Gdańsk (loan)	16	(3)
2014–2017	Lechia Gdańsk	54	(9)
2016	→ Vitória Setúbal (loan)	14	(0)
2016–2017	→ Lech Poznań (loan)	33	(2)
2017–2020	Lech Poznań	55	(5)
2019	Lech Poznań II	4	(0)
2020–2021	Jagiellonia Białystok	36	(4)
2022	Leiknir	12	(1)
2022–2024	Odra Opole	30	(5)
2023–2024	→ Wigry Suwałki (loan)	27	(19)
2024–2025	Wigry Suwałki	29	(13)
2025	Olimpia Zambrów II	1	(0)
2026–	Mazur Radzymin	14	(10)

International career
2010	Poland U21	2	(0)
2017	Poland	5	(0)
- * Club domestic league appearances and goals as of 21:17, 25 June 2026 (UTC)

Maciej Makuszewski (born 29 September 1989) is a Polish professional footballer who plays as a winger for regional league club Mazur Radzymin.

== Club career ==
Makuszewski started his career with UKS SMS Łódź.

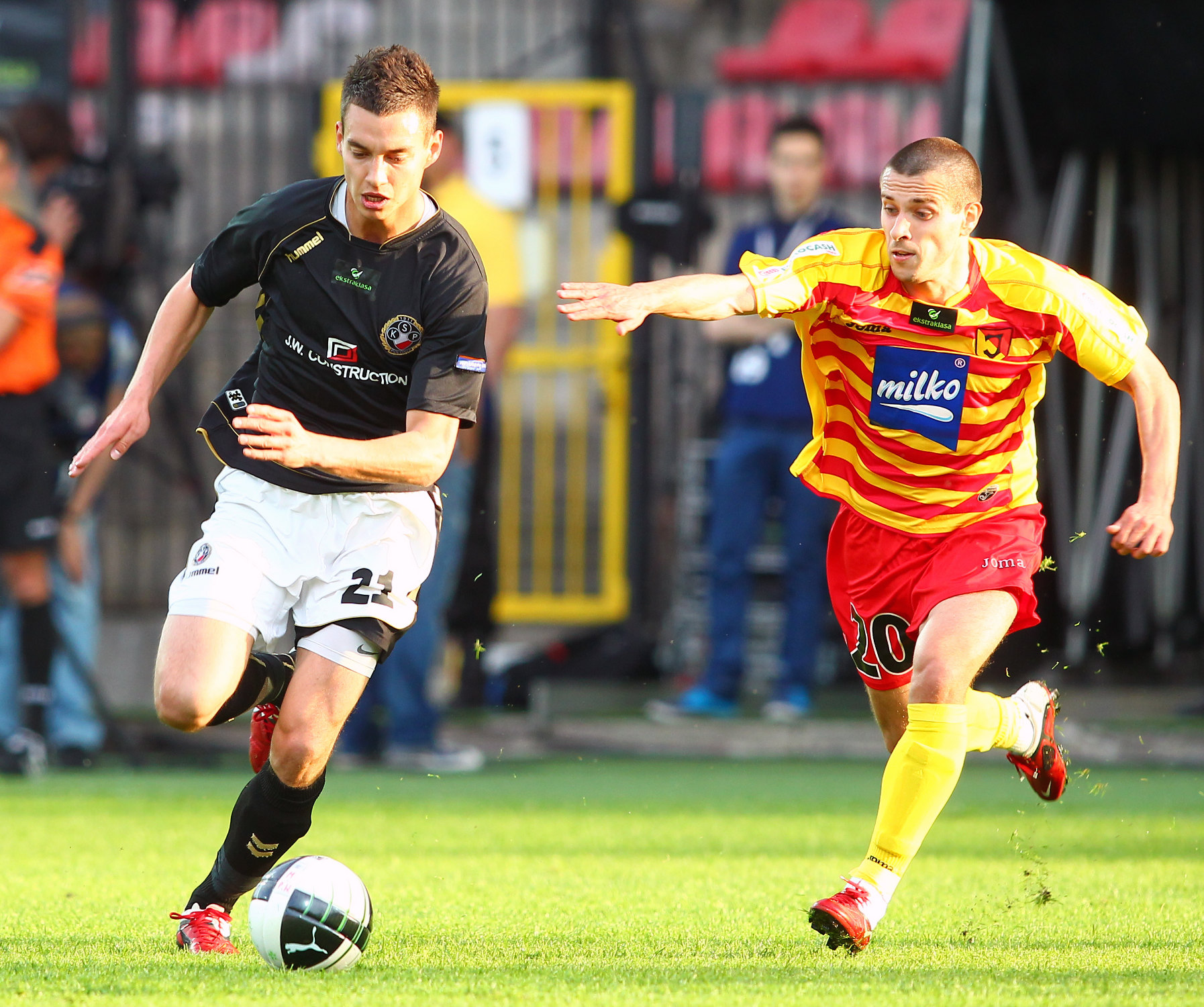
Maciej Sadlok and Maciej Makuszewski

In the summer of 2008, he joined Wigry Suwałki on a one-year deal. In June 2010, he moved to Jagiellonia Białystok where he signed a four-year contract.

On 6 September 2012, Makuszewski signed a three-year contract with the Russian Russian Premier League team, Terek Grozny. In January 2014 he was loaned to Lechia Gdańsk for six months with an option to buy.

On 11 July 2016, he joined Lech Poznań on a one-year loan with an option to buy. He joined Lech permanently on a three-yeal deal on 16 June 2017. He left the club by mutual consent on 12 February 2020.

On the same day, he returned to Jagiellonia, signing a contract until the end of the season with a one-year option.

== International career ==
He was a member of the Poland national under-21 football team. He made his debut in Poland national football team in the away game against Denmark on 1 September 2017.

In May 2018, he was named in Poland's preliminary 35-man squad for the 2018 World Cup in Russia. However, he did not make the final 23.

== Career statistics ==
=== Club ===
As of match played 14 June 2026

Appearances and goals by club, season and competition
Club	Season	League			National cup (Note: Includes Polish Cup, Russian Cup, Icelandic Cup)		Europe		Other		Total	
Club	Season	Division	Apps	Goals	Apps	Goals	Apps	Goals	Apps	Goals	Apps	Goals
SMS Łódź	2007–08	III liga, group I	27	5	—		—		—		27	5
Wigry Suwałki	2008–09	II liga	32	5	—		—		—		32	5
Wigry Suwałki	2009–10	II liga	28	6	—		—		—		28	6
Wigry Suwałki	Total		60	11	—		—		—		60	11
Jagiellonia Białystok	2010–11	Ekstraklasa	19	1	2	2	2 (Note: Appearance(s) in UEFA Europa League)	0	0	0	23	3
Jagiellonia Białystok	2011–12	Ekstraklasa	19	3	1	0	1	0	—		21	3
Jagiellonia Białystok	2012–13	Ekstraklasa	3	1	1	2	—		—		4	3
Jagiellonia Białystok	Total		41	5	4	4	3	0	0	0	48	9
Terek Grozny	2012–13	Russian Premier League	9	0	2	0	—		—		11	0
Terek Grozny	2013–14	Russian Premier League	5	0	0	0	—		—		5	0
Terek Grozny	Total		14	0	2	0	—		—		16	0
Lechia Gdańsk (loan)	2013–14	Ekstraklasa	16	3	2	0	—		—		18	3
Lechia Gdańsk	2014–15	Ekstraklasa	34	6	1	0	—		—		35	6
Lechia Gdańsk	2015–16	Ekstraklasa	20	3	2	1	—		—		22	4
Lechia Gdańsk	Total		70	12	5	1	—		—		75	13
Vitória Setúbal (loan)	2015–16	Primeira Liga	14	0	—		—		—		14	0
Lech Poznań (loan)	2016–17	Ekstraklasa	33	2	7	1	—		1 (Note: Appearance in Polish Super Cup)	1	41	4
Lech Poznań	2017–18	Ekstraklasa	21	5	1	0	6	0	—		28	5
Lech Poznań	2018–19	Ekstraklasa	29	0	0	0	5	0	—		34	0
Lech Poznań	2019–20	Ekstraklasa	5	0	2	0	—		—		7	0
Lech Poznań	Total		88	7	10	1	11	0	1	1	110	9
Lech Poznań II	2019–20	II liga	4	0	0	0	—		—		4	0
Jagiellonia Białystok	2019–20	Ekstraklasa	13	1	0	0	—		—		13	1
Jagiellonia Białystok	2020–21	Ekstraklasa	23	3	1	0	—		—		24	3
Jagiellonia Białystok	Total		36	4	1	0	—		—		37	4
Leiknir	2022	Besta deild karla	12	1	3	1	—		—		15	2
Odra Opole	2022–23	I liga	24	3	1	0	—		—		25	3
Odra Opole	2023–24	I liga	6	2	0	0	—		—		6	2
Odra Opole	Total		30	5	1	0	—		—		31	5
Wigry Suwałki (loan)	2023–24	IV liga Podlasie	27	19	0	0	—		—		27	19
Wigry Suwałki	2024–25	III liga, group I	29	13	2	1	—		—		31	14
Wigry Suwałki	Total		56	32	2	1	—		—		58	33
Olimpia Zambrów II	2025–26	Klasa A Podlasie III	1	0	—		—		—		1	0
Mazur Radzymin	2025–26	Regional league Warsaw I	14	10	—		—		—		14	10
Career total			467	92	28	8	14	0	1	1	510	101

=== International ===
Appearances and goals by national team and year
National team	Year	Apps	Goals
Poland
Poland	2017	5	0
Total		5	0

== Honours ==
Jagiellonia Białystok

- Polish Super Cup: 2010

Lech Poznań

- Polish Super Cup: 2016

Wigry Suwałki

- IV liga Podlasie: 2023–24
- Polish Cup (Podlasie regionals): 2023–24
