= 2008–09 I liga =

I liga
- Season: 2008–09
- Champions: Widzew Łódź
- Promoted: Widzew Łódź; Zagłębie Lubin; Korona Kielce
- Relegated: Kmita Zabierzów; Odra Opole; Tur Turek
- Matches played: 306
- Goals scored: 691 (2.26 per match)
- Top goalscorer: Iliyan Mitsanski (26 goals)
- Biggest home win: Podbeskidzie 9–0 Tur (23 May 2009)
- Biggest away win: GKP 0–5 Wisła Płock (8 October 2008)
- Highest scoring: Podbeskidzie 9–0 Tur (23 May 2009)
- Highest attendance: 14,998; Korona 2–2 Widzew (14 March 2009)
- Total attendance: 822,834
- Average attendance: 2,689 ▼15.1%

The 2008–09 I liga was the 61st season of the second tier domestic division in the Polish football league system since its establishment in 1949 and the 1st season of the Polish I liga under its current title (new name). Formerly, the league was known as the II liga (while the current II liga was known as the III liga). The league was operated by the Polish Football Association (PZPN).

The league was contested by 18 teams who competing for promotion to the 2009–10 Ekstraklasa. The regular season was played in a round-robin tournament. The champions and runners-up will receive automatic promotion. At the other end, the bottom four teams face automatic demotion to the II liga, while the fate of the 13th and 14th-place finishers will be decided by playoffs.

The season began on 26 July 2008, and concluded on 5 June 2009. After the 19th matchday the league will be on winter break between 16 November 2008 and 13 March 2009.

Location of teams in 2008–09 I liga

== Changes from last season ==
Promotion and relegation from 2007–08 season.

=== Ekstraklasa & I liga ===
Relegated from 2007–08 Ekstraklasa (former I liga) to I liga (former II liga)

- Zagłębie Lubin
- Korona Kielce
- Widzew Łódź

=== I liga & II liga ===
Promoted from 2007–08 third tier (former III liga) to I liga (former II liga)

- Górnik Łęczna
- GKP Gorzów Wielkopolski
- Dolcan Ząbki
- Flota Świnoujście

== League table ==
Pos	Team	Pld	W	D	L	GF	GA	GD	Pts	Promotion or relegation
1	Widzew Łódź (Note: The PZPN Emergency Committee at its meeting on 15 July 2009 recognized as binding the decision of the Football Association of Poland of 2 April 2008, regarding the transfer of Widzew Łódź to a lower class. Therefore, the team will start the 2009/2010 season again in the first league. Due to this, Korona Kielce received a direct promotion to Ekstraklasa, and the playoffs for Ekstraklasa were canceled.)	34	21	9	4	55	23	+32	72	
2	Zagłębie Lubin (P)	34	21	6	7	68	33	+35	69	Promotion to Ekstraklasa
3	Korona Kielce (P)	34	18	7	9	51	37	+14	61	Promotion to Ekstraklasa
4	Podbeskidzie Bielsko-Biała	34	17	8	9	60	29	+31	59	
5	Znicz Pruszków	34	17	7	10	44	27	+17	58	
6	Górnik Łęczna	34	16	9	9	49	36	+13	57	
7	Flota Świnoujście	34	16	5	13	43	37	+6	53	
8	Dolcan Ząbki	34	14	7	13	35	31	+4	49	
9	Warta Poznań	34	13	7	14	44	45	−1	46	
10	Wisła Płock	34	12	8	14	43	45	−2	44	
11	GKS Katowice	34	11	11	12	37	42	−5	44	
12	Stal Stalowa Wola	34	11	10	13	33	34	−1	43	
13	GKS Jastrzębie (O)	34	11	8	15	37	48	−11	41	Qualification to play-off
14	GKP Gorzów Wielkopolski (O)	34	9	9	16	39	54	−15	36	Qualification to play-off
15	Motor Lublin (R)	34	6	14	14	21	36	−15	32	Relegation to II liga
16	Tur Turek (R)	34	6	12	16	29	56	−27	30	Relegation to II liga
17	Odra Opole (R)	34	6	7	21	22	51	−29	25	Relegation to II liga
18	Kmita Zabierzów (Note: Kmita Zabierzów withdrew from the league in February 2009 as a result of financial difficulties.) (R)	34	3	12	19	11	57	−46	21	Relegation to II liga

Source: 90minut.pl (in Polish)
(O) Play-off winners; (P) Promoted; (R) Relegated

== I liga qualification play-offs ==
Team 1	Agg.	Team 2	1st leg	2nd leg
Gawin/Ślęza Wrocław (II)	0–6	GKP Gorzów Wielkopolski	0–5	0–1
Start Otwock (II)	1–2	GKS Jastrzębie	1–1	0–1

Source: 90minut.pl (in Polish)

== Season statistics ==
=== Top scorers ===
Rank	Player	Club	Goals
1	(Bulgaria) Iliyan Mitsanski	Zagłębie Lubin	26
2	(Poland) Marcin Robak	Widzew Łódź	20
3	(Poland) Krzysztof Chrapek	Podbeskidzie Bielsko-Biała	18
4	(Poland) Łukasz Cichos	Tur Turek / Korona Kielce	12
4	(Poland) Szymon Pawłowski	Zagłębie Lubin	12
6	(Poland) Michał Goliński	Zagłębie Lubin	11
7	(Poland) Adrian Paluchowski	Znicz Pruszków	10
7	(Poland) Przemysław Oziębała	Widzew Łódź	10
9	(Brazil) Andradina	Korona Kielce	9
9	(Poland) Piotr Dziuba	Flota Świnoujście	9
