= Lasse Nielsen (footballer, born 1987) =

Danish footballer (born 1988)

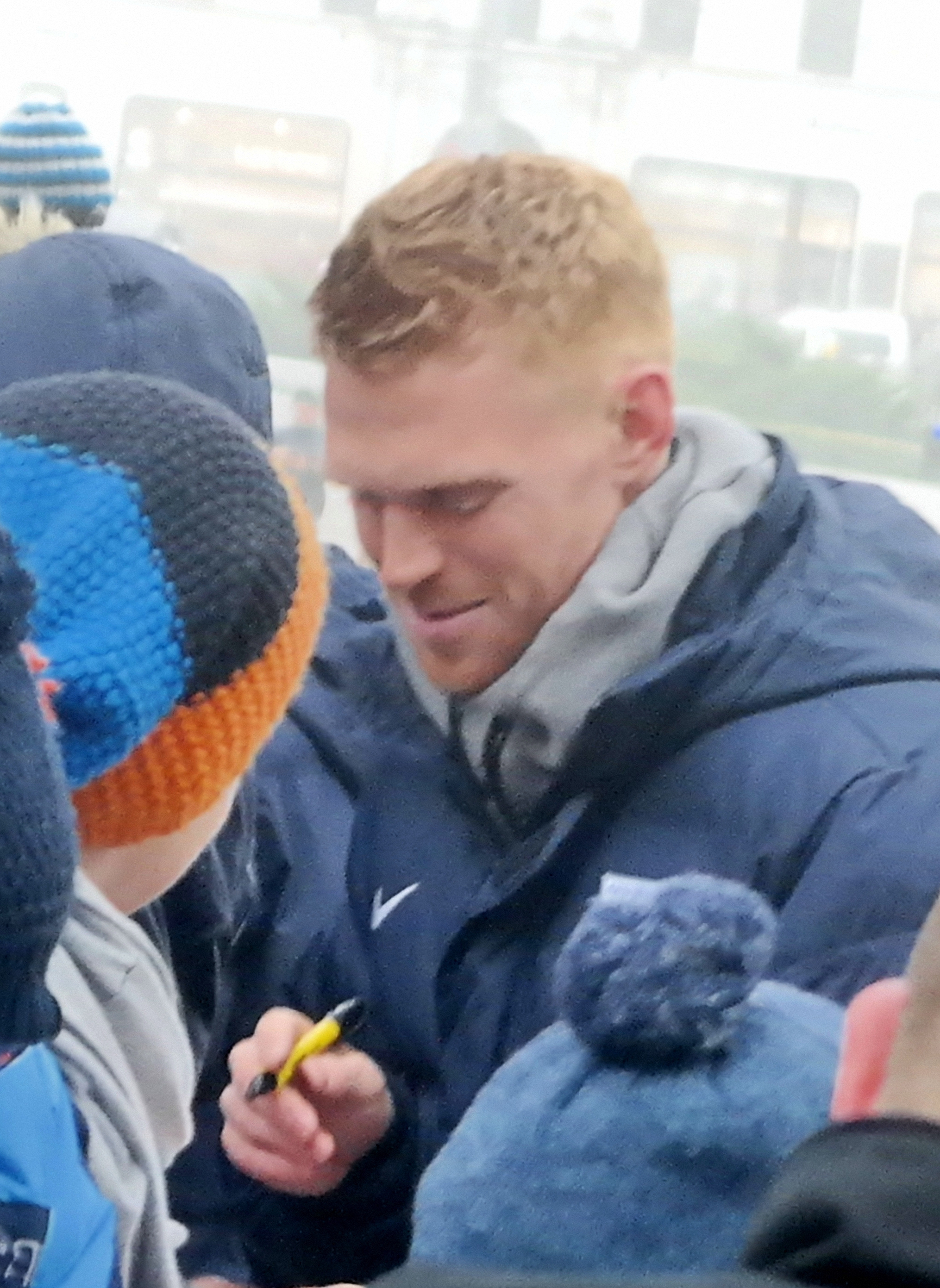
- Nielsen with Lech Poznań in 2017

Personal information
- Date of birth: 3 March 1987 (age 39)
- Place of birth: Denmark
- Height: 1.88 m (6 ft 2 in)
- Position: Centre-back

Youth career
- Herlufsholm GF

Senior career*
| Years | Team | Apps | (Gls) |
| 2005–2011 | Næstved | 88 | (4) |
| 2011–2014 | Vestsjælland | 83 | (9) |
| 2014–2016 | OB | 53 | (2) |
| 2016–2018 | Lech Poznań | 32 | (1) |
| 2018–2019 | Trelleborg | 22 | (2) |
| 2019–2020 | Lyngby | 22 | (2) |
| 2020–2022 | Næstved | 39 | (3) |
| Total | | 339 | (23) |
- * Club domestic league appearances and goals

Lasse Nielsen (Danish pronunciation: [ˈlæsə ˈne̝lsn̩]; 3 March 1987) is a Danish former professional footballer who played as a centre-back.

== Career ==
Nielsen came through the ranks of second division side Næstved BK and made his first-team debut in 2005. On 4 July 2011, he signed a three-year contract with rivals FC Vestsjælland. Two years later, Nielsen and Vestsjælland reached promotion to the Danish Superliga and he made his debut in the highest tier on 21 July 2013 in a 1–1 draw away against Brøndby IF. During the season, Nielsen formed a partnership in central defense with Jean-Claude Bozga, and the duo allowed the fewest goals on headers of all Superliga-clubs early on in the season.

His performances during the 2013–14 season attracted interest from various Superliga-clubs and on 14 June 2014, Nielsen signed a two-year contract on a free transfer with OB. His first season at OB resulted in 32 appearances in which he scored two goals. OB, however, struggled, and the club ended on a disappointing ninth place in the league table. He saw less playing time the following season, making 21 appearances and scoring no goals.

On 18 May 2016, with Nielsen's contract expiring in OB, he was signed by Polish Ekstraklasa club Lech Poznań on a three-year deal. On 7 July 2016, Nielsen won the Polish Super Cup in a 4–1 win over Legia Warsaw, making his first start and scoring his first goal for the club. He made seven starts in his first 15 league games in Poland, and called the level on which he played a clear "step up" compared to the Danish Superliga.

On 23 January 2018, Nielsen signed a three-year contract with Swedish Allsvenskan side Trelleborg, and transferred back to Denmark a year later, signing with Lyngby BK on 30 January 2019.

Nielsen returned to his first senior club, Næstved Boldklub, on 9 August 2020. He was assigned a leading role in the club, which had recently suffered relegation to the Danish 2nd Division. He retired from football in June 2022, to instead become assistant coach of Næstved.

== Career statistics ==
Appearances and goals by club, season and competition
| Club | Season | League | | | National cup (Note: Includes Danish Cup, Polish Cup, Svenska Cupen) | | Europe | | Other | | Total | |
| Club | Season | Division | Apps | Goals | Apps | Goals | Apps | Goals | Apps | Goals | Apps | Goals |
|---|---|---|---|---|---|---|---|---|---|---|---|---|
| FC Vestsjælland | 2011–12 | Danish 1st Division | 24 | 2 | 1 | 0 | — | | — | | 25 | 2 |
| FC Vestsjælland | 2012–13 | Danish 1st Division | 27 | 2 | 0 | 0 | — | | — | | 27 | 2 |
| FC Vestsjælland | 2013–14 | Danish Superliga | 32 | 5 | 2 | 0 | — | | — | | 34 | 5 |
| FC Vestsjælland | Total | | 83 | 9 | 3 | 0 | — | | — | | 86 | 9 |
| OB | 2014–15 | Danish Superliga | 32 | 2 | 0 | 0 | — | | — | | 32 | 2 |
| OB | 2015–16 | Danish Superliga | 21 | 0 | 0 | 0 | — | | — | | 21 | 0 |
| OB | Total | | 53 | 2 | 0 | 0 | — | | — | | 53 | 2 |
| Lech Poznań | 2016–17 | Ekstraklasa | 19 | 1 | 5 | 1 | — | | 1 (Note: Appearance in Polish Super Cup) | 1 | 25 | 3 |
| Lech Poznań | 2017–18 | Ekstraklasa | 13 | 0 | 1 | 0 | 4 (Note: Appearances in UEFA Europa League) | 0 | — | | 18 | 0 |
| Lech Poznań | Total | | 32 | 1 | 6 | 1 | 4 | 0 | 1 | 1 | 43 | 3 |
| Trelleborg | 2018 | Allsvenskan | 22 | 2 | 3 | 0 | — | | — | | 25 | 2 |
| Lyngby | 2018–19 | Danish 1st Division | 11 | 2 | 2 | 0 | — | | — | | 13 | 2 |
| Lyngby | 2019–20 | Danish Superliga | 11 | 0 | 0 | 0 | — | | — | | 11 | 0 |
| Lyngby | Total | | 22 | 2 | 2 | 0 | — | | — | | 24 | 2 |
| Career total | | | 212 | 16 | 14 | 1 | 4 | 0 | 1 | 1 | 231 | 18 |

== Honours ==
Lech Poznań

- Polish Super Cup: 2016
