= Łukasz Trałka =

Polish footballer

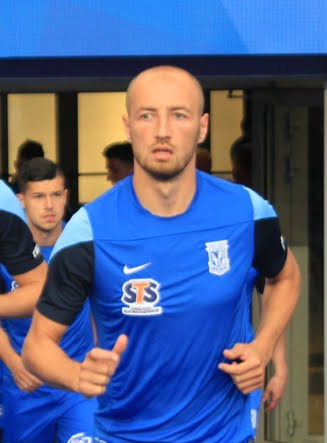
- Trałka with Lech Poznań in 2015

Personal information
- Date of birth: 11 May 1984 (age 42)
- Place of birth: Rzeszów, Poland
- Height: 1.86 m (6 ft 1 in)
- Positions: Defensive midfielder; centre-back

Team information
- Current team: Lech Poznań Academy (vice-director)

Youth career
- UKS Ropczyce
- Błękitni Ropczyce
- 1999–2002: Igloopol Dębica

Senior career*
Years	Team	Apps	(Gls)
2002–2003	Concordia Piotrków Trybunalski	10	(0)
2003–2006	Pogoń Szczecin	53	(3)
2006	→ Widzew Łódź (loan)	8	(0)
2007	KSZO Ostrowiec	13	(0)
2007–2008	ŁKS Łódź	8	(0)
2008	Lechia Gdańsk	30	(3)
2009–2012	Polonia Warsaw	92	(7)
2012–2019	Lech Poznań	217	(12)
2019–2022	Warta Poznań	90	(5)
Total		521	(30)

International career
	Poland U21	6	(1)
2008–2012	Poland	7	(0)
- * Club domestic league appearances and goals

Łukasz Trałka (born 11 May 1984) is a Polish football pundit, co-commentator and former player who played mainly as a defensive midfielder. He made 431 Ekstraklasa appearances for Pogoń Szczecin, ŁKS Łódź, Lechia Gdańsk, Polonia Warsaw, Lech Poznań and Warta Poznań, the 5th most of all players in the league's history. He also represented Poland at international level.

== Club career ==
Trałka made his Ekstraklasa debut as a Pogoń Szczecin player on 1 August 2004 in a 1–2 home loss against Legia Warsaw.

From 2012 until 2019, Trałka represented Lech Poznań, where he celebrated his biggest successes, including winning a title in the 2014–15 season. He also served as the team's captain from 2014 until 2017 and briefly in 2018.

On 15 August 2019, Trałka joined I liga side Warta Poznań. In his first season with the team, he helped them return to Ekstraklasa after 25 years of absence.

He made the final appearance of his career on 14 May 2022 in a 1–2 loss in the Poznań derby against his former club Lech, and was substituted in the 1st minute to a guard of honour from both teams.

== International career ==
He made his debut for the Poland national team in a friendly match against Serbia on 14 December 2008.

== Career statistics ==
=== Club ===
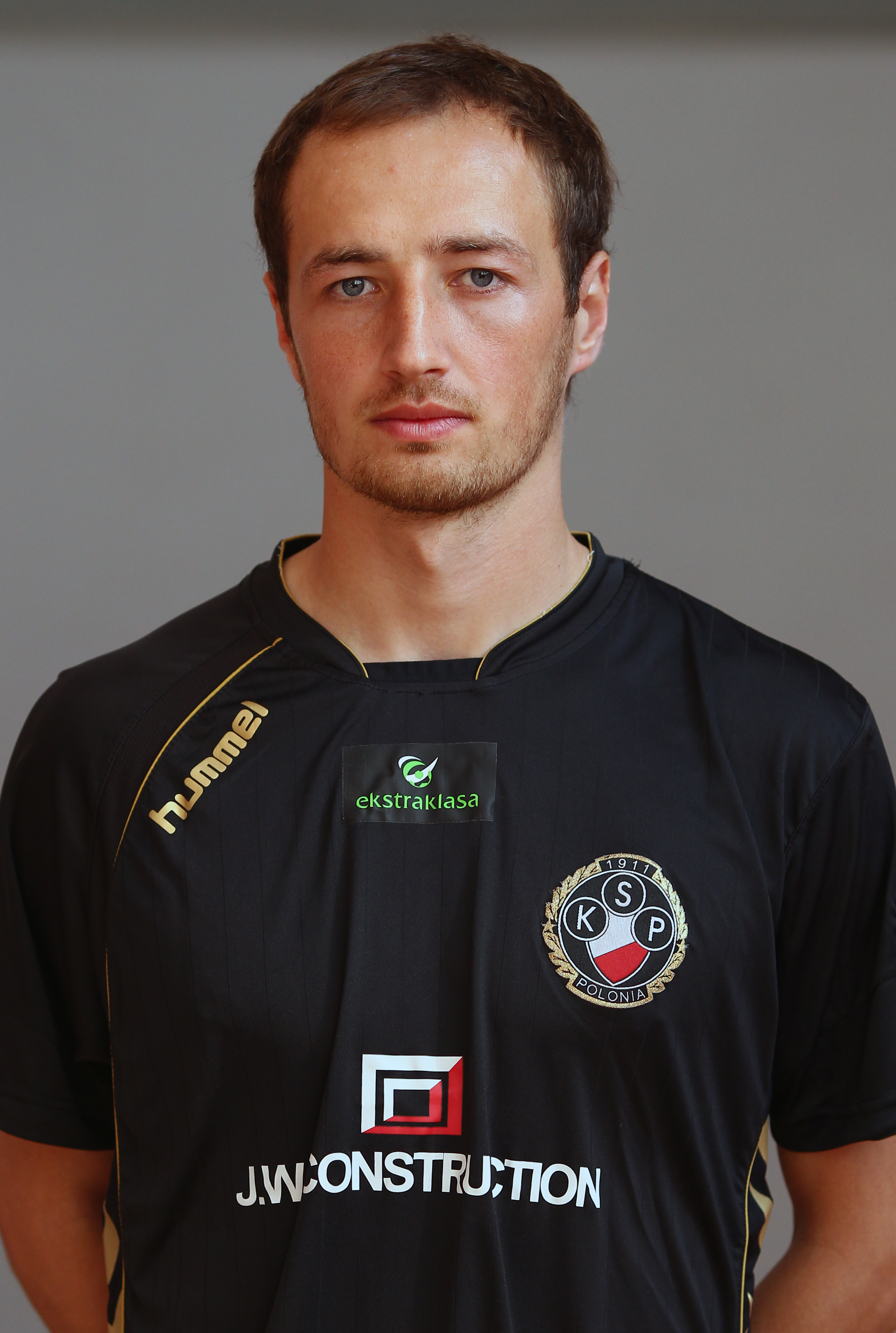
Trałka as Polonia Warsaw player

Appearances and goals by club, season and competition
Club	Season	League			Polish Cup		Europe		Other		Total	
Club	Season	Division	Apps	Goals	Apps	Goals	Apps	Goals	Apps	Goals	Apps	Goals
Concordia Piotrków Trybunalski	2002–03	II liga	10	0	—		—		—		10	0
Pogoń Szczecin	2003–04	II liga	15	0	0	0	—		—		15	0
Pogoń Szczecin	2004–05	Ekstraklasa	13	2	9	0	—		—		22	2
Pogoń Szczecin	2005–06	Ekstraklasa	13	1	2	0	4 (Note: Appearances in UEFA Intertoto Cup)	0	—		19	1
Pogoń Szczecin	2006–07	Ekstraklasa	12	0	2	0	—		3 (Note: Appearances in Ekstraklasa Cup)	0	17	0
Pogoń Szczecin	Total		53	3	13	0	4	0	3	0	73	3
Widzew Łódź (loan)	2005–06	II liga	8	0	—		—		—		8	0
KSZO Ostrowiec Świętokrzyski	2006–07	II liga	13	0	—		—		—		13	0
ŁKS Łódź	2007–08	Ekstraklasa	8	0	2	0	—		2	1	12	1
Lechia Gdańsk	2007–08	II liga	14	1	2	0	—		—		16	1
Lechia Gdańsk	2008–09	Ekstraklasa	16	2	1	0	—		2	0	19	2
Lechia Gdańsk	Total		30	3	3	0	—		2	0	35	3
Polonia Warsaw	2008–09	Ekstraklasa	13	2	4	0	—		—		17	2
Polonia Warsaw	2009–10	Ekstraklasa	28	1	1	0	3 (Note: Appearances in UEFA Europa League)	0	—		32	1
Polonia Warsaw	2010–11	Ekstraklasa	26	3	3	0	—		—		29	3
Polonia Warsaw	2011–12	Ekstraklasa	25	1	2	0	—		—		27	1
Polonia Warsaw	Total		92	7	10	0	3	0	—		105	7
Lech Poznań	2012–13	Ekstraklasa	28	1	1	1	4	0	—		33	2
Lech Poznań	2013–14	Ekstraklasa	32	1	2	0	4	0	—		38	1
Lech Poznań	2014–15	Ekstraklasa	32	0	5	0	4	0	—		41	0
Lech Poznań	2015–16	Ekstraklasa	30	1	6	0	12 (Note: Four appearances in UEFA Champions League, eight appearances and one goal in UEFA Europa League)	1	1 (Note: Appearance in Polish Super Cup)	0	49	2
Lech Poznań	2016–17	Ekstraklasa	34	2	6	1	—		1	0	51	3
Lech Poznań	2017–18	Ekstraklasa	34	6	0	0	5	1	—		39	7
Lech Poznań	2018–19	Ekstraklasa	27	1	2	0	4	1	—		33	2
Lech Poznań	Total		217	12	22	2	33	3	2	0	275	17
Warta Poznań	2019–20	I liga	30	1	0	0	—		—		30	1
Warta Poznań	2020–21	Ekstraklasa	29	3	2	1	—		—		31	4
Warta Poznań	2021–22	Ekstraklasa	31	1	1	0	—		—		32	1
Warta Poznań	Total		90	5	3	1	—		—		93	6
Career total			521	30	53	3	40	3	9	1	623	37

=== International ===
Appearances and goals by national team and year
National team	Year	Apps	Goals
Poland
Poland	2008	1	0
Poland	2009	4	0
Poland	2011	1	0
Poland	2012	1	0
Total		7	0

== Honours ==
Pogoń Szczecin

- II liga: 2003–04

Widzew Łódź

- II liga: 2005–06

Lechia Gdańsk

- II liga: 2007–08

Lech Poznań

- Ekstraklasa: 2014–15
- Polish Super Cup: 2015, 2016
