= Abdul Aziz Tetteh =

Ghanaian footballer

Aziz Tetteh
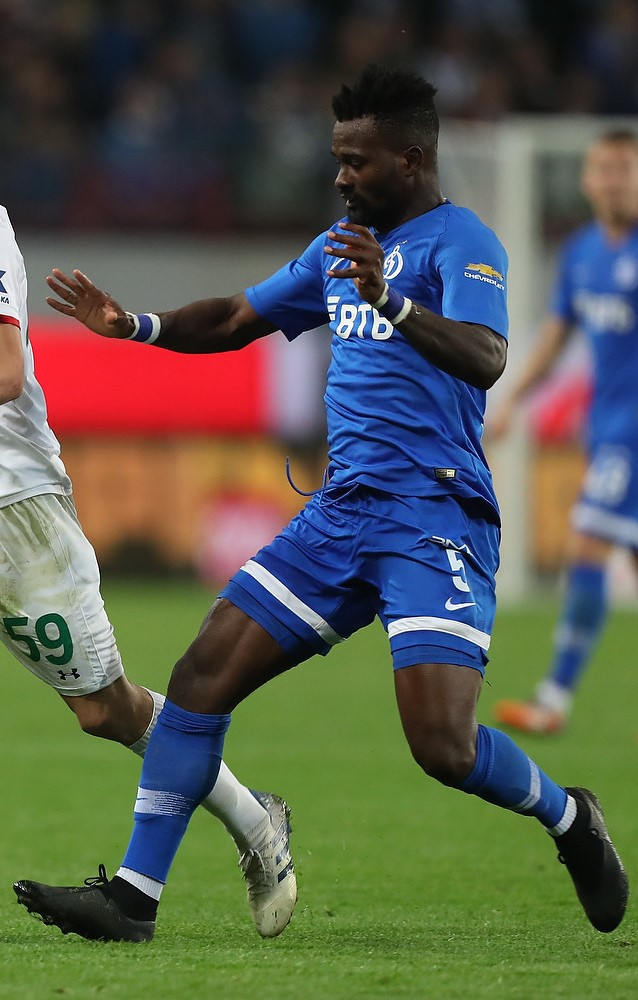
- Tetteh with Dynamo Moscow in 2018

Personal information
- Full name: Abdul Aziz Tetteh
- Date of birth: 25 May 1990 (age 36)
- Place of birth: Dansoman, Ghana
- Height: 1.88 m (6 ft 2 in)
- Position: Defensive midfielder

Senior career*
Years	Team	Apps	(Gls)
2007	Liberty Professionals		
2008–2013	Udinese	0	(0)
2008–2009	→ Xerez (loan)	0	(0)
2009–2010	→ Granada (loan)	4	(1)
2010–2011	→ Leganés (loan)	22	(1)
2011–2012	→ Montañeros (loan)	31	(0)
2012–2013	Fokikos	12	(2)
2013–2015	Platanias	67	(8)
2015–2018	Lech Poznań	65	(1)
2015	Lech Poznań II	2	(0)
2018–2019	Dynamo Moscow	35	(1)
2019–2021	Gaziantep	7	(0)
2021–2022	Widzew Łódź	8	(0)
- * Club domestic league appearances and goals

Abdul Aziz Tetteh (born 25 May 1990) is a Ghanaian former professional footballer who played as a defensive midfielder.

== Career ==
Tetteh began his career with Dansoman-based Liberty Professionals. He was an integral member of the Liberty Pro. team before signed with Udinese Calcio in January 2008. Tetteh left in summer 2008 Udinese Calcio and joined on loan with Xerez of the Spanish Segunda División. After a year with Xerez he returned to Udinese Calcio which then loaned him to Granada. After spending a few years out on loans he joined Platanias in 2013.

On 31 January 2018, he signed with the Russian club Dynamo Moscow.

On 5 August 2019, Tetteh signed a three-year contract with Turkish Süper Lig club Gazişehir Gaziantep. After two seasons in Turkey, Tetteh returned to Poland, signing a one-year deal with Widzew Łódź on 23 July 2021, with an option to extend it for another two years.

== International career ==
He earned his first call-up in February 2008 for the local national team by French head coach Claude Le Roy for an African Nations Championship match. In March 2008 was called from Head coach Sellas Tetteh in the Black Satellites team.

== Career statistics ==
As of 13 May 2018.

Appearances and goals by club, season and competition
Club	Season	League			National cup (Note: Includes Greek Cup, Polish Cup)		Europe		Other		Total	
Club	Season	Division	Apps	Goals	Apps	Goals	Apps	Goals	Apps	Goals	Apps	Goals
Fokikos	2012–13	Beta Ethniki	12	2	0	0	—		—		12	2
Fokikos	Total		12	2	0	0	—		—		12	2
Platanias	2012–13	Super League Greece	11	1	3	0	—		—		14	1
Platanias	2013–14	Super League Greece	29	4	1	0	—		—		30	4
Platanias	2014–15	Super League Greece	27	3	2	0	—		—		29	3
Platanias	Total		67	8	6	0	—		—		73	8
Lech Poznań	2015–16	Ekstraklasa	28	0	4	0	6 (Note: One appearance in UEFA Champions League, five appearances in UEFA Europa League)	0	0	0	38	0
Lech Poznań	2016–17	Ekstraklasa	26	1	3	0	—		1 (Note: Appearance in Polish Super Cup)	0	30	1
Lech Poznań	2017–18	Ekstraklasa	11	0	1	0	4 (Note: Appearances in UEFA Europa League)	0	—		16	0
Lech Poznań	Total		65	1	8	0	10	0	1	0	84	1
Dynamo Moscow	2017–18	Russian Premier League	7	0	—		—		—		7	0
Career total			151	11	14	0	10	0	1	0	176	11

== Honours ==
Lech Poznań

- Polish Super Cup: 2016
