= Szymon Pawłowski (footballer) =

Polish footballer

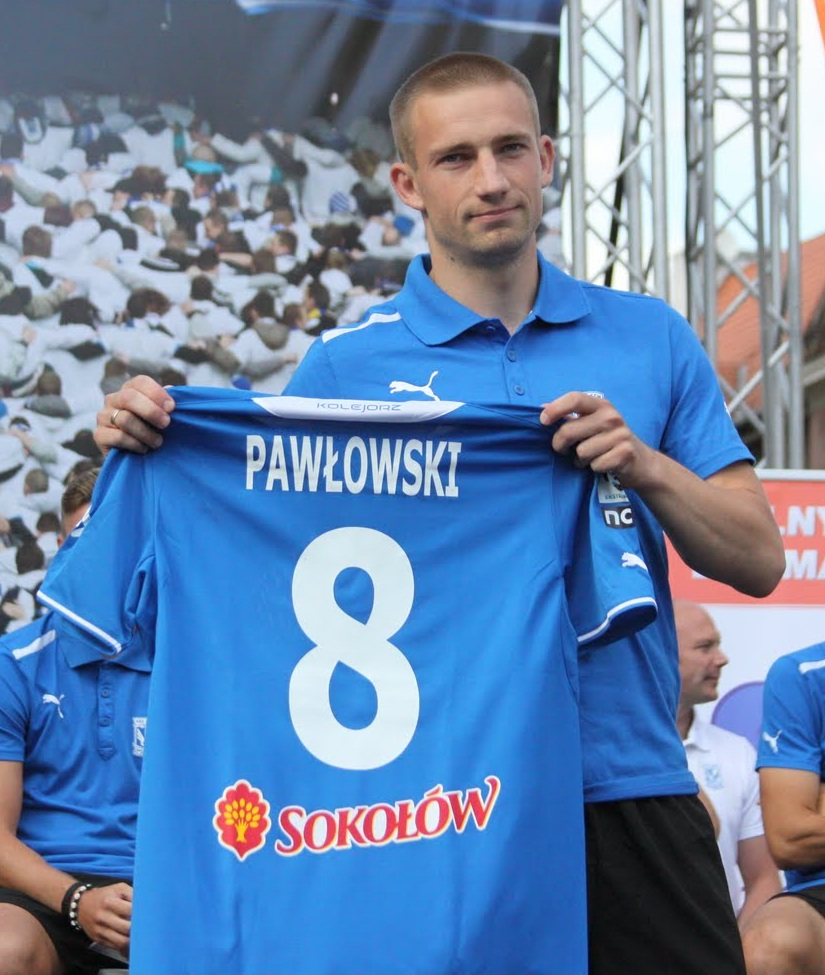
- Pawłowski with Lech Poznań in 2013

Personal information
- Full name: Szymon Pawłowski
- Date of birth: 4 November 1986 (age 40)
- Place of birth: Połczyn Zdrój, Poland
- Height: 1.75 m (5 ft 9 in)
- Position: Attacking midfielder

Team information
- Current team: GES Poznań (head coach)

Youth career
- Pomorzanin Sławoborze

Senior career*
Years	Team	Apps	(Gls)
2003–2004	MSP Szamotuły		
2004–2006	Mieszko Gniezno		
2006–2013	Zagłębie Lubin	139	(36)
2013–2018	Lech Poznań	117	(20)
2013	Lech Poznań II	1	(0)
2017–2018	→ Bruk-Bet Termalica (loan)	28	(3)
2018–2023	Zagłębie Sosnowiec	131	(21)
2023–2024	Lech Poznań II	40	(12)
2024–2025	Warta Poznań	11	(0)
2025–	Pomorzanin Sławoborze	5	(5)

International career
	Poland U21	10	(2)
2007–2014	Poland	17	(2)

Managerial career
- 2025–: GES Poznań
- * Club domestic league appearances and goals

Szymon Pawłowski (born 4 November 1986) is a Polish former professional footballer who played as an attacking midfielder or winger. He is currently in charge of Klasa A club GES Sport Academy Poznań.

== Club career ==
Born in Połczyn Zdrój, Pawłowski made his Ekstraklasa debut in a 2–0 win over Lech Poznań on 10 March 2007.

On 31 August 2017, he was loaned to Bruk-Bet Termalica Nieciecza.

== International career ==
He made his first appearance for the Poland national team in a friendly against Bosnia and Herzegovina in December 2007.

== Career statistics ==
=== Club ===
Appearances and goals by club, season and competition
Club	Season	League			Polish Cup		Europe		Other		Total	
Club	Season	Division	Apps	Goals	Apps	Goals	Apps	Goals	Apps	Goals	Apps	Goals
Zagłębie Lubin	2006–07	Ekstraklasa	4	0	0	0	—		3 (Note: Appearances in Ekstraklasa Cup)	0	7	0
Zagłębie Lubin	2007–08	Ekstraklasa	26	3	5	2	0	0	3	1	34	6
Zagłębie Lubin	2008–09	I liga	33	12	4	1	—		—		37	13
Zagłębie Lubin	2009–10	Ekstraklasa	8	0	0	0	—		—		8	0
Zagłębie Lubin	2010–11	Ekstraklasa	19	5	0	0	—		—		19	5
Zagłębie Lubin	2011–12	Ekstraklasa	26	8	1	0	—		—		27	8
Zagłębie Lubin	2012–13	Ekstraklasa	23	8	4	2	—		—		27	10
Zagłębie Lubin	Total		139	36	14	5	0	0	6	1	159	42
Lech Poznań	2013–14	Ekstraklasa	31	4	1	1	4 (Note: Appearances in UEFA Europa League)	0	—		36	5
Lech Poznań	2014–15	Ekstraklasa	33	9	6	2	4	0	—		43	11
Lech Poznań	2015–16	Ekstraklasa	31	6	4	1	10 (Note: Four appearances in UEFA Champions League, six appearances in UEFA Europa League)	0	1 (Note: Appearance in Polish Super Cup)	0	46	7
Lech Poznań	2016–17	Ekstraklasa	22	1	5	2	—		1	0	28	3
Lech Poznań	Total		117	20	16	6	18	0	2	0	153	26
Lech Poznań II	2013–14	III liga, gr. II	1	0	—		—		—		1	0
Termalica (loan)	2017–18	Ekstraklasa	28	3	1	0	—		—		29	3
Zagłębie Sosnowiec	2018–19	Ekstraklasa	32	5	0	0	—		—		32	5
Zagłębie Sosnowiec	2019–20	I liga	33	6	1	0	—		—		34	6
Zagłębie Sosnowiec	2020–21	I liga	22	1	1	0	—		—		23	1
Zagłębie Sosnowiec	2021–22	I liga	26	7	2	2	—		—		28	9
Zagłębie Sosnowiec	2022–23	I liga	18	2	2	1	—		—		20	3
Zagłębie Sosnowiec	Total		131	21	6	3	—		—		137	24
Lech Poznań II	2022–23	II liga	14	4	—		—		—		14	4
Lech Poznań II	2023–24	II liga	26	8	1	0	—		—		27	8
Lech Poznań II	Total		40	12	1	0	—		—		41	12
Warta Poznań	2024–25	I liga	11	0	0	0	—		—		11	0
Pomorzanin Sławoborze	2024–25	Reg. league	5	5	—		—		—		5	5
Career total			472	97	38	14	18	0	8	1	536	112

=== International ===
Appearances and goals by national team and year
National team	Year	Apps	Goals
Poland
Poland	2007	1	0
Poland	2008	2	0
Poland	2009	1	0
Poland	2010	1	0
Poland	2011	6	0
Poland	2012	2	1
Poland	2013	2	1
Poland	2014	2	0
Total		17	2

Scores and results list Poland's goal tally first, score column indicates score after each Pawłowski goal.

List of international goals scored by Szymon Pawłowski
No.	Date	Venue	Opponent	Score	Result	Competition
1	14 December 2012	Mardan Sports Complex, Aksu, Turkey	Macedonia	2–0	4–1	Friendly
2	2 February 2013	Estadio Ciudad de Málaga, Málaga, Spain	Romania	1–0	4–1	Friendly

== Managerial statistics ==
Managerial record by team and tenure
Team	From	To	Record							
Team	From	To	G	W	D	L	GF	GA	GD	Win %
GES Poznań	1 July 2025	Present	0	0	0	0	0	0	+0	—
Total			0	0	0	0	0	0	+0	—

== Honours ==
Zagłębie Lubin

- Ekstraklasa: 2006–07

Lech Poznań

- Ekstraklasa: 2014–15
- Polish Super Cup: 2015, 2016

Individual

- Ekstraklasa Plus of the Season: 2014–15
