= 2016 Polish Super Cup =

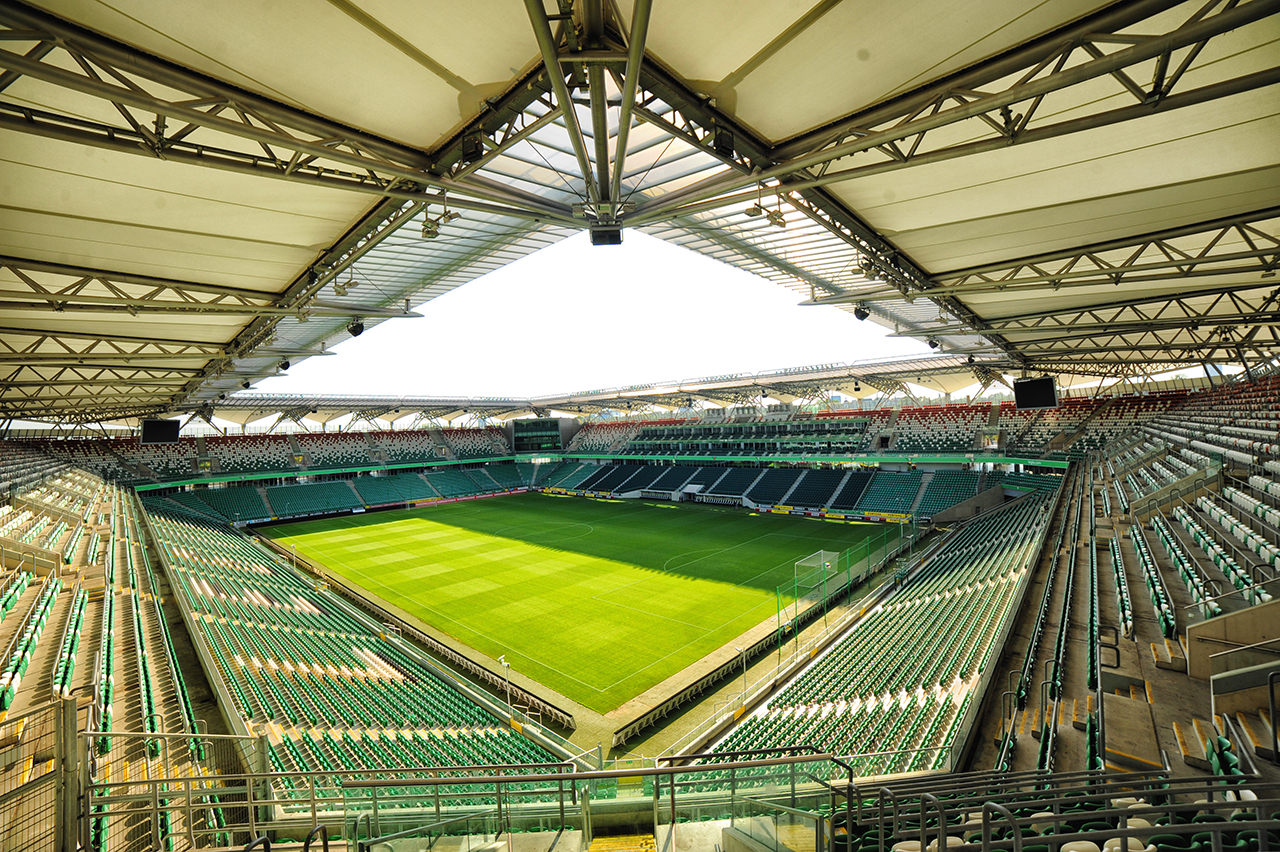
- The Polish Army Stadium in Warsaw hosted the final.
Legia Warsaw	Lech Poznań
1	4
- Date: 7 July 2016
- Venue: Stadion Wojska Polskiego, Warsaw
- Referee: Krzysztof Jakubik (Siedlce)
- Attendance: 14,310

The 2016 Polish Super Cup was held on 7 July 2016 between the 2015–16 Ekstraklasa winners and the 2015–16 Polish Cup winners Legia Warsaw and the 2015–16 Polish Cup runners-up Lech Poznań.

== Match details ==
7 July 2016
17:30 CEST (UTC+02:00)

Legia Warsaw	1–4	Lech Poznań
Guilherme 36'	Report	Makuszewski 22'; L. Nielsen 65'; Formella 90+1', 90+3'

Stadion Wojska Polskiego, Warsaw
Attendance: 14,310
Referee: Krzysztof Jakubik (Siedlce)

Legia Warsaw	Lech Poznań

GK	1	(Poland) Arkadiusz Malarz
RB	28	(Poland) Łukasz Broź	(yellow card) 34'	(substituted off) 70'
CB	25	(Poland) Jakub Rzeźniczak (c)
CB	4	(Poland) Igor Lewczuk
LB	14	(Czech Republic) Adam Hloušek		(substituted off) 77'
RM	16	(Poland) Michał Masłowski		(substituted off) 56'
CM	6	(Brazil) Guilherme	(yellow card) 27'
LM	47	(Poland) Rafał Makowski	(yellow card) 58'	(substituted off) 89'
RW	77	(Bulgaria) Mihail Aleksandrov		(substituted off) 67'
LW	18	(Poland) Michał Kucharczyk
CF	99	(Switzerland) Aleksandar Prijović
Substitutes:
GK	33	(Poland) Radosław Cierzniak
MF	13	(Poland) Jakub Kosecki		(substituted in) 89'
MF	15	(Poland) Michał Kopczyński
DF	17	(Poland) Tomasz Brzyski		(substituted in) 67'
DF	19	(Poland) Bartosz Bereszyński		(substituted in) 70'
MF	23	(Bosnia and Herzegovina) Stojan Vranješ		(substituted in) 56'
MF	53	(Poland) Sebastian Szymański		(substituted in) 77'
Manager:
(Albania) Besnik Hasi

GK	1	(Bosnia and Herzegovina) Jasmin Burić
RB	4	(Poland) Tomasz Kędziora
CB	26	(Poland) Maciej Wilusz
CB	3	(Denmark) Lasse Nielsen
LB	2	(Poland) Robert Gumny
CM	6	(Poland) Łukasz Trałka (c)	(yellow card) 50'
CM	55	(Ghana) Abdul Aziz Tetteh
RM	17	(Poland) Maciej Makuszewski		(substituted off) 75'
AM	14	(Poland) Maciej Gajos		(substituted off) 64'
LM	8	(Poland) Szymon Pawłowski		(substituted off) 68'
CF	19	(Denmark) Nicki Bille Nielsen	(yellow card) 40'	(substituted off) 46'
Substitutes:
GK	36	(Poland) Mateusz Lis
FW	11	(Poland) Marcin Robak		(substituted in) 46'
MF	20	(Poland) Dariusz Formella		(substituted in) 68'
DF	21	(The Gambia) Kebba Ceesay
DF	23	(Finland) Paulus Arajuuri
MF	29	(Poland) Kamil Jóźwiak		(substituted in) 75'
MF	86	(Poland) Radosław Majewski		(substituted in) 64'
Manager:
(Poland) Jan Urban

Match officials:
Referee:
Krzysztof Jakubik
Assistant referees:
Konrad Sapela
Dawid Golis
Fourth official:
Sebastian Krasny

Match rules

- 90 minutes.
- Penalty shoot-out if scores still level.
- Seven named substitutes.
- Maximum of five substitutions.

== See also ==
- 2016–17 Ekstraklasa
- 2016–17 Polish Cup
