= 2022 HJK season =

HJK
2022 season
- Chairman: Olli-Pekka Lyytikäinen
- Manager: Toni Koskela
- Stadium: Bolt Arena
- Veikkausliiga: 1st (champions)
- Finnish Cup: Quarterfinal vs Inter Turku
- League Cup: Quarterfinal vs Honka
- UEFA Champions League: Second qualifying round vs Viktoria Plzeň
- UEFA Europa League: Group Stage
- Top goalscorer: League: Bojan Radulović (8); All: Bojan Radulović (11)
- Highest home attendance: 10,164 vs Real Betis (8 September 2022)
- Lowest home attendance: 0 vs IFK Mariehamn (5 February 2022)
- Average home league attendance: 4,578 (27 October 2022)
| Home colours | Away colours |

The 2022 season was Helsingin Jalkapalloklubi's 114th competitive season. HJK qualified for the UEFA Europa League and won the Veikkausliiga for the third consecutive season.

== Season events ==
Prior to the start of the new year, and new league season, HJK announced the signings of Pyry Soiri from Esbjerg fB on 4 October, Joona Toivio from BK Häcken on 1 November, Murilo from SJK on 5 November, Arttu Hoskonen from Inter Turku on 8 November and Jukka Raitala from Minnesota United on 21 December.

On 11 January, HJK announced the signing of Manuel Martic to a one-year contract, from Mezőkövesd.

On 19 January, HJK announced the signing of Conor Hazard from Celtic, on loan for the season. The next day, 20 January, HJK announced the signing of Miska Ylitolva to a two-year contract, from RoPS.

On 15 February, HJK announced the loan signing of Bojan Radulović from AIK until the end of the season.

On 1 March, HJK announced the loan signing of Nassim Boujellab from Schalke 04 until the end of the season.

On 21 April, HJK announced the return of Përparim Hetemaj on a two-year contract, from Reggina.

On 13 June, HJK terminated their contract with Jair following his conviction for Child sexual abuse.

On 14 July, HJK announced the loan signing of Malik Abubakari from Malmö until the end of the season. The following day, 15 July, free-agent Paulus Arajuuri signed for HJK on a contract until the end of the season.

On 25 July, HJK announced the signing of Aapo Halme on a contract until the end of 2024, from Barnsley.

On 31 July, HJK made their loan signing of Bojan Radulović a permanent from AIK, with Radulović signing until the end of the 2023 season.

== Squad ==
As of match played 3 November 2022

| No. | Name | Nationality | Position | Date of birth (age) | Signed from | Signed in | Contract ends | Apps. | Goals |
Goalkeepers
| 1 | Conor Hazard | (Northern Ireland) | GK | 5 March 1998 (aged 24) | on loan from Celtic | 2022 | 2022 | 39 | 0 |
| 12 | Jakob Tånnander | (Sweden) | GK | 10 August 2000 (aged 22) | Malmö | 2020 | 2021 | 24 | 0 |
| 79 | Matias Niemelä | (Finland) | GK | 15 March 2002 (aged 20) | Klubi 04 | 2020 | | 1 | 0 |
Defenders
| 2 | Paulus Arajuuri | (Finland) | DF | 15 June 1988 (aged 34) | Unattached | 2022 | 2022 | 4 | 0 |
| 4 | Joona Toivio | (Finland) | DF | 10 March 1988 (aged 34) | BK Häcken | 2022 | 2024 | 15 | 0 |
| 5 | Arttu Hoskonen | (Finland) | DF | 16 April 1997 (aged 25) | Inter Turku | 2022 | 2023 | 36 | 3 |
| 6 | Aapo Halme | (Finland) | DF | 22 May 1998 (aged 24) | Barnsley | 2022 | 2024 | 40 | 1 |
| 14 | Matti Peltola | (Finland) | DF | 3 July 2002 (aged 20) | Klubi 04 | 2019 | 2022 | 62 | 1 |
| 15 | Miro Tenho | (Finland) | DF | 2 April 1995 (aged 27) | Inter Turku | 2020 | 2023 | 99 | 6 |
| 16 | Valtteri Moren | (Finland) | DF | 15 June 1991 (aged 31) | Waasland-Beveren | 2020 | 2022 | 170 | 9 |
| 20 | Murilo | (Brazil) | DF | 2 December 1995 (aged 26) | SJK | 2022 | 2023 | 33 | 2 |
| 22 | Jukka Raitala | (Finland) | DF | 15 September 1988 (aged 34) | Minnesota United | 2022 | 2023 | 112 | 0 |
| 27 | Kevin Kouassivi-Benissan | (Finland) | DF | 25 January 1999 (aged 23) | Klubi 04 | 2018 | 2021(+1) | 30 | 0 |
| 28 | Miska Ylitolva | (Finland) | DF | 23 May 2004 (aged 18) | RoPS | 2022 | 2023 | 7 | 0 |
Midfields
| 8 | Lucas Lingman | (Finland) | MF | 25 January 1998 (aged 24) | on loan from Helsingborg | 2022 | | 102 | 4 |
| 10 | Nassim Boujellab | (Morocco) | MF | 20 June 1999 (aged 23) | on loan from Schalke 04 | 2022 | 2022 | 32 | 1 |
| 17 | Manuel Martic | (Austria) | MF | 15 August 1995 (aged 27) | Mezőkövesd | 2022 | 2022 | 17 | 2 |
| 19 | Casper Terho | (Finland) | MF | 24 June 2003 (aged 19) | Klubi 04 | 2020 | | 58 | 7 |
| 21 | Santeri Väänänen | (Finland) | MF | 1 January 2002 (aged 20) | Klubi 04 | 2018 | | 76 | 2 |
| 23 | Pyry Soiri | (Finland) | MF | 22 September 1994 (aged 28) | Esbjerg fB | 2022 | 2023 | 29 | 1 |
| 37 | Atomu Tanaka | (Japan) | MF | 4 October 1987 (aged 35) | Cerezo Osaka | 2020 | 2022 | 182 | 36 |
| 56 | Përparim Hetemaj | (Finland) | MF | 12 December 1986 (aged 35) | Reggina | 2022 | 2023 | | |
| 58 | Johannes Yli-Kokko | (Finland) | MF | 24 August 2001 (aged 21) | Klubi 04 | 2022 | | 26 | 4 |
Forwards
| 7 | Santeri Hostikka | (Finland) | FW | 30 September 1997 (aged 25) | Pogoń Szczecin | 2021 | 2022 | 53 | 5 |
| 9 | Riku Riski | (Finland) | FW | 16 August 1989 (aged 33) | Odd | 2018 | | 138 | 34 |
| 11 | Roope Riski | (Finland) | FW | 16 August 1991 (aged 31) | SKN St. Pölten | 2020 | 2021(+1) | 80 | 43 |
| 18 | Bojan Radulović | (Serbia) | FW | 29 December 1999 (aged 22) | AIK | 2022 | 2023 | 36 | 10 |
| 24 | David Browne | (Papua New Guinea) | FW | 27 December 1995 (aged 26) | Auckland City | 2020 | 2022 | 103 | 12 |
| 29 | Anthony Olusanya | (Finland) | FW | 1 February 2000 (aged 22) | FF Jaro | 2021 | 2022(+1) | 63 | 11 |
| 77 | Malik Abubakari | (Ghana) | FW | 10 May 2000 (aged 22) | on loan from Malmö FF | 2022 | 2022 | 23 | 2 |
Klubi 04
| 43 | Viggo Blummé | (Finland) | MF | 7 October 2004 (aged 18) | Klubi 04 | 2022 | | 1 | 0 |
| 47 | Oscar Häggström | (Finland) | MF | 24 April 2004 (aged 18) | Klubi 04 | 2022 | | 1 | 0 |
| 52 | Aaro Toivonen | (Finland) | MF | 19 April 2005 (aged 17) | Klubi 04 | 2022 | | 1 | 0 |
| 61 | Niilo Kujasalo | (Finland) | MF | 17 March 2004 (aged 18) | Klubi 04 | 2022 | | 1 | 0 |
| 63 | Luigi Morães | (Finland) | MF | 27 June 2002 (aged 20) | Klubi 04 | 2022 | | 1 | 0 |
| 64 | Taavi Arminen | (Finland) | DF | 23 January 2004 (aged 18) | Klubi 04 | 2022 | | 1 | 0 |
| 67 | Daniel Rökman | (Finland) | MF | 20 March 2004 (aged 18) | Pallokerho Keski-Uusimaa | 2022 | | 1 | 0 |
Away on loan
| 41 | Samuel Anini Junior | (Finland) | FW | 7 September 2002 (aged 20) | PK Keski-Uusimaa | 2019 | 2021 | 0 | 0 |
| 42 | Kai Meriluoto | (Finland) | FW | 2 January 2003 (aged 19) | Klubi 04 | 2020 | | 3 | 1 |
| 45 | Elmo Henriksson | (Finland) | GK | 10 March 2003 (aged 19) | Klubi 04 | 2021 | | 0 | 0 |
| | Patrik Raitanen | (Finland) | DF | 13 June 2001 (aged 21) | Unattached | 2021 | | 0 | 0 |
Left during the season
| 3 | Janne Saksela | (Finland) | DF | 14 March 1993 (aged 29) | Ilves | 2021 | 2022 | 30 | 2 |
| 6 | Jair | (Brazil) | MF | 3 August 1994 (aged 28) | Ilves | 2021 | | 50 | 12 |
| 8 | Bubacar Djaló | (Portugal) | MF | 2 February 1997 (aged 25) | Sporting CP B | 2020 | 2020(+2) | 39 | 0 |
| 74 | Abubakar Haruna | (Ghana) | DF | 26 September 2000 (aged 22) | Unattached | 2022 | | 1 | 0 |
| 88 | Pyry Hannola | (Finland) | MF | 21 October 2001 (aged 21) | Midtjylland | 2020 | | 10 | 0 |

=== On loan ===
Note: Flags indicate national team as defined under FIFA eligibility rules; some limited exceptions apply. Players may hold more than one non-FIFA nationality.

| No. | Pos. | Nation | Player |
|---|---|---|---|
| 41 | FW | FIN | Samuel Anini Junior (to IFK Mariehamn) |
| 42 | MF | FIN | Kai Meriluoto (to Ilves) |

| No. | Pos. | Nation | Player |
|---|---|---|---|
| 45 | GK | FIN | Elmo Henriksson (to IFK Mariehamn) |
| — | DF | FIN | Patrik Raitanen (to IFK Mariehamn) |

=== Left the club during the season ===
Note: Flags indicate national team as defined under FIFA eligibility rules; some limited exceptions apply. Players may hold more than one non-FIFA nationality.

| No. | Pos. | Nation | Player |
|---|---|---|---|
| 3 | DF | FIN | Janne Saksela (Retired) |
| 6 | MF | BRA | Jair (to Petrolul Ploiești) |
| 8 | MF | POR | Bubacar Djaló (to Rochester New York) |

| No. | Pos. | Nation | Player |
|---|---|---|---|
| 74 | DF | GHA | Abubakar Haruna (to Mikkelin Palloilijat) |
| 88 | MF | FIN | Pyry Hannola (to SJK) |

== Transfers ==
=== In ===
| Date | Position | Nationality | Name | From | Fee | Ref. |
|---|---|---|---|---|---|---|
| 4 October 2021† | MF | (Finland) | Pyry Soiri | Esbjerg fB | Undisclosed | |
| 1 November 2021† | DF | (Finland) | Joona Toivio | BK Häcken | Undisclosed | |
| 5 November 2021† | DF | (Brazil) | Murilo | SJK | Undisclosed | |
| 8 November 2021† | DF | (Finland) | Arttu Hoskonen | Inter Turku | Undisclosed | |
| 21 December 2021† | DF | (Finland) | Jukka Raitala | Minnesota United | Undisclosed | |
| 11 January 2022 | MF | (Austria) | Manuel Martic | Mezőkövesd | Undisclosed | |
| 20 January 2022 | DF | (Finland) | Miska Ylitolva | RoPS | Undisclosed | |
| 21 April 2022 | MF | (Finland) | Përparim Hetemaj | Reggina | Undisclosed | |
| 15 July 2022 | DF | (Finland) | Paulus Arajuuri | Unattached | Free | |
| 25 July 2022 | DF | (Finland) | Aapo Halme | Barnsley | Undisclosed | |
| 31 July 2022 | FW | (Serbia) | Bojan Radulović | AIK | Undisclosed | |

† Transfers announced on the above date, being finalised on 1 January 2022.

=== Loans in ===
| Start date | Position | Nationality | Name | From | End date | Ref. |
|---|---|---|---|---|---|---|
| 19 January 2022 | GK | (Northern Ireland) | Conor Hazard | Celtic | End of season | |
| 15 February 2022 | FW | (Serbia) | Bojan Radulović | AIK | 31 July 2022 | |
| 1 March 2022 | MF | (Morocco) | Nassim Boujellab | Schalke 04 | End of season | |
| 14 July 2022 | FW | (Ghana) | Malik Abubakari | Malmö | End of season | |

=== Out ===
| Date | Position | Nationality | Name | To | Fee | Ref. |
|---|---|---|---|---|---|---|
| 5 April 2022 | MF | (Finland) | Pyry Hannola | SJK | €80,000 | |

=== Loans out ===
| Start date | Position | Nationality | Name | To | End date | Ref. |
|---|---|---|---|---|---|---|
| 20 January 2022 | GK | (Finland) | Elmo Henriksson | IFK Mariehamn | End of season | |
| 15 February 2022 | FW | (Finland) | Kai Meriluoto | Ilves | End of 2023 season | |
| 28 February 2022 | DF | (Finland) | Patrik Raitanen | IFK Mariehamn | End of season | |
| 22 April 2022 | FW | (Finland) | Samuel Anini Junior | IFK Mariehamn | End of season | |

=== Released ===
| Date | Position | Nationality | Name | Joined | Date | Ref. |
|---|---|---|---|---|---|---|
| 26 January 2022 | MF | (Portugal) | Bubacar Djaló | Rochester New York | 7 February 2022 | |
| 13 June 2022 | MF | (Brazil) | Jair | Petrolul Ploiești | 17 June 2022 | |
| 14 October 2022 | DF | (Finland) | Janne Saksela | Retired | | |

== Friendlies ==
| | – |
| EEST (UTC+3) |

== Competitions ==
=== Overall record ===
| Competition | First match | Last match | Starting round | Final position | Record | | | | | | | |
| Competition | First match | Last match | Starting round | Final position | Pld | W | D | L | GF | GA | GD | Win % |
|---|---|---|---|---|---|---|---|---|---|---|---|---|
| Veikkausliiga | 2 April 2022 | 16 October 2022 | Matchday 1 | Winners | 27 | 18 | 4 | 5 | 41 | 23 | +18 | 66.67 |
| Finnish Cup | 24 May 2022 | 28 June 2022 | Fifth round | Quarterfinal | 3 | 1 | 2 | 0 | 4 | 0 | +4 | 33.33 |
| League Cup | 5 February 2022 | 2 March 2022 | Group stage | Quarterfinal | 4 | 2 | 0 | 2 | 8 | 7 | +1 | 50.00 |
| UEFA Champions League | 6 July 2022 | 26 July 2022 | First qualifying round | Second qualifying round | 4 | 1 | 0 | 3 | 3 | 9 | −6 | 25.00 |
| UEFA Europa League | 4 August 2022 | 3 November 2022 | Third qualifying round | Group stage | 10 | 3 | 2 | 5 | 7 | 14 | −7 | 30.00 |
| Total | | | | | 48 | 25 | 8 | 15 | 63 | 53 | +10 | 52.08 |

Last updated: 3 November 2022
Source: Competitions

=== Veikkausliiga ===
==== Regular season ====
===== Results summary =====
| Overall | | | | | | | | Home | | | | | | Away | | | | | |
| Pld | W | D | L | GF | GA | GD | Pts | W | D | L | GF | GA | GD | W | D | L | GF | GA | GD |
|---|---|---|---|---|---|---|---|---|---|---|---|---|---|---|---|---|---|---|---|
| 22 | 15 | 4 | 3 | 34 | 18 | +16 | 49 | 8 | 1 | 2 | 19 | 12 | +7 | 7 | 3 | 1 | 15 | 6 | +9 |

Last updated: 11 September 2022.
Source: See Results

===== Results by matchday =====
| Round | 1 | 2 | 3 | 4 | 5 | 6 | 7 | 8 | 9 | 10 | 11 | 12 | 13 | 14 | 15 | 16 | 17 | 18 | 19 | 20 | 21 | 22 |
|---|---|---|---|---|---|---|---|---|---|---|---|---|---|---|---|---|---|---|---|---|---|---|
| Ground | H | A | A | H | A | A | H | A | H | H | A | H | A | H | H | A | H | A | A | H | H | A |
| Result | W | W | W | L | W | W | W | D | W | W | D | L | L | D | W | W | W | D | W | W | W | W |

Updated to match(es) played on 11 September 2022. Source: See Results
A = Away; H = Home; W = Win; D = Draw; L = Loss

===== Results =====
| 2 April 2022 1 | HJK | 1 – 0 | Honka | Helsinki |
| 15:00 EEST (UTC+3) | Boujellab (yellow card) 18'; Terho 68' | Report | Tammilehto (yellow card) 18' | Stadium: Bolt Arena; Attendance: 4,650; Referee: Mattias Gestranius |

| 8 April 2022 2 | SJK | 0 – 1 | HJK | Seinäjoki |
| 18:00 EEST (UTC+3) | Dunwoody (yellow card) 66'; Håkans (yellow card) 88' | Report | Tanaka (yellow card) 71'; Raitala (yellow card) 73'; Olusanya 83' | Stadium: OmaSP Stadion; Attendance: 2,358; Referee: Antti Munukka |

| 18 April 2022 3 | VPS | 0 – 1 | HJK | Vaasa |
| 18:00 EEST (UTC+3) | Ahiabu (yellow card) 50'; Yengi (yellow card) 60'; Vahtera (yellow card) 82' | Report | Tanaka 79' | Stadium: Hietalahti Stadium; Attendance: 2,286; Referee: Jari Järvinen |

| 23 April 2022 4 | HJK | 1 – 4 | Inter Turku | Helsinki |
| 15:00 EEST (UTC+3) | Raitala (yellow card) 23'; Terho 27'; Yli-Kokko (yellow card) 42' | Report | Forsell 16'; Nurmi (yellow card) 41'; Jyry (yellow card) 66'; Haro 71'; Källman 75'; Tamminen 78'; Viitala (yellow card) 83' | Stadium: Bolt Arena; Attendance: 3,446; Referee: Oskari Hämäläinen |

| 28 April 2022 5 | HIFK | 0 – 2 | HJK | Helsinki |
| 18:00 EEST (UTC+3) | Bäckman (yellow card) 10'; Kamavuaka (yellow card) 23'; Mattila (yellow card) 66' | Report | Tenho 45+1'; Radulović 70' | Stadium: Bolt Arena; Attendance: 7,103; Referee: Joni Hyytiä |

| 3 May 2022 6 | Inter Turku | 0 – 1 | HJK | Turku |
| 18:00 EEST (UTC+3) | Forsell (yellow card) 42' (yellow-red card) 66'; Riikonen (yellow card) 43'; Viitala (yellow card) 66'; Arciero (yellow card) 90+3' | Report | Toivio (yellow card) 2'; Tenho (yellow card) 35'; Radulović 42'; Murilo (yellow card) 88' | Stadium: Veritas Stadion; Attendance: 1,717; Referee: Dennis Antamo |

| 8 May 2022 7 | HJK | 2 – 1 | Ilves | Helsinki |
| 18:30 EEST (UTC+3) | Boujellab (yellow card) 59'; Jair 76', 82' | Report | Vidjeskog 18'; Katz (yellow card) 45'; Leislahti (yellow card) 68' | Stadium: Bolt Arena; Attendance: 2,012; Referee: Petri Viljanen |

| 12 May 2022 8 | Lahti | 1 – 1 | HJK | Lahti |
| 18:00 EEST (UTC+3) | Penninkangas 16'; Henrique (yellow card) 27'; Emsis (yellow card) 31' | Report | Olusanya 22' (yellow card) 34'; Martic (yellow card) 75' | Stadium: Lahti Stadium; Attendance: 1,689; Referee: Oliver Reitala |

| 17 May 2022 9 | HJK | 3 – 2 | Lahti | Helsinki |
| 18:00 EEST (UTC+3) | Radulović 50'; Hetemaj 56'; Murilo (yellow card) 74'; Memolla 89' (o.g.) | Report | Virta (yellow card) 21'; Pirttijoki 45'; Christofi (yellow card) 53'; Emsis (yellow card) 68'; Penninkangas 84' | Stadium: Bolt Arena; Attendance: 2,124; Referee: Antti Munukka |

| 22 May 2022 10 | HJK | 4 – 1 | Haka | Helsinki |
| 18:30 EEST (UTC+3) | Hetemaj (yellow card) 27'; Tenho 39'; Browne 50'; Boujellab 51'; Martic 88' | Report | Erwin 5' (yellow card) 28'; Sihvonen (yellow card) 55' de Lucas (yellow card) 74' | Stadium: Bolt Arena; Attendance: 3,443; Referee: Ville Nevalainen |

| 29 May 2022 11 | KuPS | 0 – 0 | HJK | Kuopio |
| 18:00 EEST (UTC+3) | Hämäläinen (yellow card) 88'; Ikaunieks (yellow card) 90+2' | Report | Hostikka (yellow card) 16'; Raitala (yellow card) 47'; Serrarens (yellow card) 77'; Murilo (yellow card) 90' | Stadium: Kuopio Football Stadium; Attendance: 3,094; Referee: Mohammad Al-Emara |

| 18 June 2022 12 | HJK | 0 – 1 | AC Oulu | Helsinki |
| 17:00 EEST (UTC+3) | Boujellab (yellow card) 26'; Peltola (yellow card) 49'; Radulović (yellow card) 69' (yellow-red card) 71'; Hoskonen (yellow card) 80' | Report | Yaghoubi (yellow card) 9'; Floro (yellow card) 43'; López 73' | Stadium: Bolt Arena; Attendance: 3,059; Referee: Joni Hyytiä |

| 22 June 2022 13 | IFK Mariehamn | 2 – 1 | HJK | Mariehamn |
| 19:00 EEST (UTC+3) | Coubronne (yellow card) 25'; Owoeri 32' (yellow card) 90+2'; Nissinen (yellow card) 46'; Baliso (yellow card) 73'; Dé 77'; Tamminen (yellow card) 84' | Report | Hostikka 14' (yellow card) 79'; Yli-Kokko (yellow card) 21'; Tenho (yellow card) 35' | Stadium: Wiklöf Holding Arena; Attendance: 2,122; Referee: Peiman Simani |

| 2 July 2022 14 | HJK | 1 – 1 | KuPS | Helsinki |
| 17:00 EEST (UTC+3) | Radulović 63' (pen.); Yli-Kokko (yellow card) 90+3' | Report | Bispo 6'; Hämäläinen (yellow card) 61' | Stadium: Bolt Arena; Attendance: 5,707; Referee: Oliver Reitala |

| 16 July 2022 15 | HJK | 3 – 1 | VPS | Helsinki |
| 17:00 EEST (UTC+3) | Yli-Kokko 19'; Hoskonen 62'; Abubakari 80'; Hazard (yellow card) 88' | Report | Multanen 39'; Alanko (yellow card) 58'; Hudd (yellow card) 85'; Niemi (yellow card) 90+2' | Stadium: Bolt Arena; Attendance: 3,607; Referee: Peiman Simani |

| 23 July 2022 16 | Ilves | 1 – 2 | HJK | Tampere |
| 14:00 EEST (UTC+3) | Larsson 35' | Report | Radulović 72'; Hoskonen 88' | Stadium: Tampere Stadium; Attendance: 3,453; Referee: Oliver Reitala |

| 30 July 2022 17 | HJK | 1 – 0 | IFK Mariehamn | Helsinki |
| 17:00 EEST (UTC+3) | Tenho (yellow card) 13'; Terho 42' | Report | Nissinen (yellow card) 33'; Olawale (yellow card) 90' | Stadium: Bolt Arena; Attendance: 3,871; Referee: Jari Järvinen |

| 7 August 2022 18 | AC Oulu | 1 – 1 | HJK | Oulu |
| 19:00 EEST (UTC+3) | Rafinha (yellow card) 13'; Breitenmoser (yellow card) 82'; Floro (yellow card) 88'; Kabashi (yellow card) 88'; Sakho (yellow card) 88'; López 90+1' | Report | Radulović 14'; Soiri (yellow card) 34'; Hetemaj (yellow card) 82'; Hoskonen (yellow card) 88' | Stadium: Raatti Stadium; Attendance: 2,877; Referee: Oskari Hämäläinen |

| 21 August 2022 19 | Haka | 0 – 3 | HJK | Valkeakoski |
| 18:00 EEST (UTC+3) | Zarokostas (yellow card) 7' | Report | Browne (yellow card) 34'; Olusanya 38'; Radulović 42'; Halme 45+1' | Stadium: Tehtaan kenttä Attendance: 2,434; Referee: Mohammad Al-Emara |

| 28 August 2022 20 | HJK | 1 – 0 | SJK | Helsinki |
| 18:30 EEST (UTC+3) | Olusanya 19'; Peltola (yellow card) 28'; Väänänen (yellow card) 39'; Hetemaj (yellow card) 71'; Soiri (yellow card) 72' | Report | Hannola (yellow card) 42'; Yaghoubi (yellow card) 55'; Jervis (yellow card) 77' | Stadium: Bolt Arena; Attendance: 3,676; Referee: Oskari Hämäläinen |

| 5 September 2022 21 | HJK | 2 – 1 | HIFK | Helsinki |
| 18:00 EEST (UTC+3) | Terho 12' (yellow card) 90+5'; Toivio (yellow card) 42'; Hostikka 87' | Report | Roberto 5' (yellow card) 76'; Ani (yellow card) 85'; S.Eremenko (yellow card) 90+3' | Stadium: Bolt Arena; Attendance: 7,052; Referee: Antti Munukka |

| 11 September 2022 22 | Honka | 1 – 2 | HJK | Espoo |
| 16:00 EEST (UTC+3) | Hernández (yellow card) 61'; Krebs (yellow card) 72'; Arko-Mensah (yellow card) 81'; Voutilainen 84' | Report | Väänänen 3'; Olusanya 90+1'; Arajuuri (yellow card) 90+4' | Stadium: Tapiolan urheilupuisto Attendance: 4,015; Referee: Peiman Simani |

===== Table =====
| Pos | Team | Pld | W | D | L | GF | GA | GD | Pts | Qualification |
|---|---|---|---|---|---|---|---|---|---|---|
| 1 | HJK | 22 | 15 | 4 | 3 | 34 | 18 | +16 | 49 | Qualification for the Championship round |
| 2 | KuPS | 22 | 14 | 5 | 3 | 36 | 16 | +20 | 47 | Qualification for the Championship round |
| 3 | Honka | 22 | 12 | 5 | 5 | 45 | 21 | +24 | 41 | Qualification for the Championship round |
| 4 | Haka | 22 | 11 | 4 | 7 | 36 | 38 | −2 | 37 | Qualification for the Championship round |
| 5 | Inter Turku | 22 | 9 | 5 | 8 | 40 | 28 | +12 | 32 | Qualification for the Championship round |

Updated to match(es) played on 11 September 2022. Source: https://us.soccerway.com/national/finland/veikkausliiga/2022/regular-season/r66785/
Rules for classification: 1) Points; 2) Goal difference; 3) Goals scored; 4) Head-to-head points; 5) Head-to-head goal difference; 6) Head-to-head away goals scored; 7) Play-off
(Note: Play-off is only played if need to decide champion, teams for relegation or UEFA competition and will be played on a neutral ground).

==== Championship round ====
===== Results summary =====
| Overall | | | | | | | | Home | | | | | | Away | | | | | |
| Pld | W | D | L | GF | GA | GD | Pts | W | D | L | GF | GA | GD | W | D | L | GF | GA | GD |
|---|---|---|---|---|---|---|---|---|---|---|---|---|---|---|---|---|---|---|---|
| 5 | 3 | 0 | 2 | 7 | 5 | +2 | 9 | 2 | 0 | 1 | 5 | 2 | +3 | 1 | 0 | 1 | 2 | 3 | −1 |

Last updated: 16 October 2022.
Source: See Results

===== Results by matchday =====
| Round | 1 | 2 | 3 | 4 | 5 |
|---|---|---|---|---|---|
| Ground | H | A | H | A | H |
| Result | W | L | W | W | L |

Updated to match(es) played on 16 October 2022. Source: See Results
A = Away; H = Home; W = Win; D = Draw; L = Loss

===== Results =====
| 18 September 2022 23 | HJK | 2 – 1 | SJK | Helsinki |
| 18:30 EEST (UTC+3) | Soiri 8'; Lingman (yellow card) 59'; Hetemaj 87'; Abubakari (yellow card) 90+3' | Report | Jervis 19'; Rojas (yellow card) 38'; Kaukua (yellow card) 44'; Fati (yellow card) 76' | Stadium: Bolt Arena; Attendance: 2,237; Referee: Ville Nevalainen |

| 29 September 2022 24 | Honka | 3 – 1 | HJK | Espoo |
| 18:00 EEST (UTC+3) | Jansen (yellow card) 39'; Arko-Mensah 58'; Sadiku 71' (pen.); Aalto (yellow card) 74'; Rudakov (yellow card) 90+4'; Bagarić 90+7' | Report | Boujellab (yellow card) 14'; Hoskonen 35'; Raitala (yellow card) 70' | Stadium: Tapiolan urheilupuisto Attendance: 1,463; Referee: Mohammad Al-Emara |

| 2 October 2022 25 | HJK | 3 – 0 | Inter Turku | Helsinki |
| 18:30 EEST (UTC+3) | Väänänen (yellow card) 19'; Olusanya 49', 71'; Tanaka (yellow card) 82'; Radulović 86' (pen.) | Report | Hyvärinen (yellow card) 23'; Niska (yellow card) 65' (yellow-red card) 89'; Arciero (yellow card) 70' | Stadium: Bolt Arena; Attendance: 4,381; Referee: Petri Viljanen |

| 9 October 2022 26 | Haka | 0 – 1 | HJK | Valkeakoski |
| 18:00 EEST (UTC+3) | Friberg (yellow card) 61'; Rogerson (yellow card) 68'; Erwin (yellow card) 71' | Report | Browne 13'; Tenho (yellow card) 58'; Lingman (yellow card) 70'; Väänänen (yellow card) 86' | Stadium: Tehtaan kenttä Attendance: 3,300; Referee: Simani Peiman |

| 16 October 2022 27 | HJK | 0 – 1 | KuPS | Helsinki |
| 17:00 EEST (UTC+3) | Martic (yellow card) 55' | Report | Dahlström (yellow card) 16'; Oksanen 31'; T.Miettinen (yellow card) 62'; Ricardo (yellow card) 90+2' | Stadium: Bolt Arena; Attendance: 6,768; Referee: Simani Peiman |

===== Table =====
| Pos | Team | Pld | W | D | L | GF | GA | GD | Pts | Qualification |
|---|---|---|---|---|---|---|---|---|---|---|
| 1 | HJK (C, Q) | 27 | 18 | 4 | 5 | 41 | 23 | +18 | 58 | Qualification for the Champions League first qualifying round |
| 2 | KuPS (Q) | 27 | 17 | 6 | 4 | 43 | 21 | +22 | 57 | Qualification for the Europa Conference League second qualifying round |
| 3 | Honka (Q) | 27 | 14 | 7 | 6 | 53 | 27 | +26 | 49 | Qualification for the Europa Conference League first qualifying round |
| 4 | Haka (O) | 27 | 13 | 6 | 8 | 40 | 40 | 0 | 45 | Qualification for the national Europa Conference League play-offs. |
| 5 | Inter Turku | 27 | 10 | 5 | 12 | 42 | 36 | +6 | 35 | Qualification for the national Europa Conference League play-offs. |

Source: Flashscore
Rules for classification: 1) Points; 2) Goal difference; 3) Goals scored; 4) Head-to-head points; 5) Head-to-head goal difference; 6) Head-to-head away goals scored; 7) Play-off
(Note: Play-off is only played if need to decide champion, teams for relegation or UEFA competition and will be played on a neutral ground).
(C) Champions; (O) Play-off winners; (Q) Qualified for the phase indicated

=== Finnish Cup ===
| 24 May 2022 Fifth round | Klubi 04 | 0 – 4 | HJK | Helsinki |
| 18:00 EEST (UTC+3) | | Report | Yli-Kokko 28', 47'; Riski 32'; Terho 57' | Stadium: Bolt Arena; Attendance: 431; Referee: Dennis Antamo |

| 13 June 2022 Sixth Round | VPS | 0 – 0 (1 – 2 p) | HJK | Vaasa |
| 18:00 EEST (UTC+3) | Pikkarainen (yellow card) 46'; Yengi (yellow card) 71' | Report | Boujellab (yellow card) 38' | Stadium: Kaarlen kenttä Attendance: 780; Referee: Petri Viljanen |
| | Penalties |
| | Morrissey (penalty missed); Pahkasalo (penalty missed); Pikkarainen (penalty missed); Lindeman (penalty scored); Yengi (penalty missed) | | (penalty scored) Radulović; (penalty missed) Toivio; (penalty missed) Hostikka; (penalty missed) Boujellab; (penalty scored) Martic |

| 28 June 2022 Quarterfinal | Inter Turku | 0 – 0 (5 – 4 p) | HJK | Turku |
| 18:00 EEST (UTC+3) | Tamminen (yellow card) 44'; Ketting (yellow card) 54' | Report | Boujellab (yellow card) 30'; Murilo (yellow card) 55' | Stadium: Veritas Stadion; Attendance: 1,462; Referee: Oskari Hämäläinen |
| | Penalties |
| | Forsell (penalty scored); Källman (penalty scored); Ojala (penalty scored); Haro (penalty scored); Ruxi (penalty scored) | | (penalty scored) Browne; (penalty scored) Olusanya; (penalty scored) Soiri; (penalty scored) Hoskonen; (penalty missed) Tånnander |

=== League Cup ===
==== Group Stage ====
| 5 February 2022 1 | HJK | 2 – 3 | IFK Mariehamn | Helsinki |
| 14:00 EET (UTC+2) | Ro.Riski 19', 37'; Tenho (yellow card) 84' | Report | Tamminen (yellow card) 8'; Latonen 39'; Dé 82'; Sjöroos 87' | Stadium: Tali halli tekonurmi Attendance: 0 Referee: Kaarlo Hämäläinen |

| 16 February 2022 2 | HIFK | 1 – 3 | HJK | Helsinki |
| 13:00 EET (UTC+2) | Ali (red card) 26'; Bäckman 74' | Report | Radulović 16'; Ro.Riski 47' (pen.), 60' | Stadium: Jätkäsaari Tekonurmi; Attendance: 1 Referee: Mattias Gestranius |

| 19 February 2022 3 | HJK | 2 – 1 | Inter Turku | Helsinki |
| 14:00 EET (UTC+2) | Serrarens 33'; Browne (yellow card) 41'; Yli-Kokko 87'; Martic (yellow card) 90+3' | Report | Haro (yellow card) 35'; Källman 63' (pen.) | Stadium: Tali halli tekonurmi Attendance: 324; Referee: Antti Munukka |

==== Knockout stage ====
| 2 March 2022 Quarterfinal | HJK | 1 – 2 | Honka | Helsinki |
| 15:00 EET (UTC+2) | Tiquinho 21'; Rökman (yellow card) 59'; Haruna (yellow card) 85' | Report | Tammilehto (yellow card) 68'; Sadiku 69', 83'; Modesto (yellow card) 86'; Jansen (yellow card) 87' (goal) 90+2' | Stadium: Töölö PK 1 Tekonurmi; Attendance: 12; Referee: Oliver Reitala |

=== UEFA Champions League ===
==== Qualifying rounds ====
| 6 July 2022 First Qualifying Round 1st leg | HJK (Finland) | 1 – 0 | (Latvia) RFS | Helsinki, Finland |
| 19:00 EEST (UTC+3) | Martic 11'; Väänänen (yellow card) 15'; Peltola (yellow card) 49' | Report | Jagodinskis (yellow card) 11'; Zjuzins (yellow card) 47'; Sorokins (yellow card) 83' | Stadium: Bolt Arena; Attendance: 3,874; Referee: Juxhin Xhaja (Albania) |

| 12 July 2022 First Qualifying Round 2nd leg | RFS (Latvia) | 2 – 1 (a.e.t.) (2 – 2 agg.) (4 – 5 p) | (Finland) HJK | Jūrmala, Latvia |
| 18:30 EEST (UTC+3) | Lipušček (yellow card) 21'; Vlalukin (yellow card) 21'; Zjuzins (yellow card) 29' (goal) 48'; Jatta (yellow card) 39'; Panić 56'; Friesenbichler (yellow card) 66'; Mareš (yellow card) 77'; Šarić (yellow card) 102' | Report | Murilo (yellow card) 44' (goal) 75'; Tenho (yellow card) 81'; Radulović (yellow card) 93'; Hetemaj (yellow card) 109' | Stadium: Slokas Stadium; Attendance: 1,631; Referee: David Fuxman (Israel) |
| | Penalties |
| | Jagodinskis (penalty scored); Šarić (penalty scored); Panić (penalty missed); Lipušček (penalty scored); Mareš (penalty scored) | | (penalty scored) Väänänen; (penalty scored) Murilo; (penalty scored) Radulović; (penalty scored) Serrarens; (penalty scored) Terho |
Note: RFS played their home match at the Slokas Stadium in Jūrmala, instead of their regular stadium, LNK Sports Parks, in Riga, which did not meet UEFA requirements.

| 20 July 2022 Second Qualifying Round 1st leg | HJK (Finland) | 1 – 2 | (Czech Republic) Viktoria Plzeň | Helsinki, Finland |
| 19:00 EEST (UTC+3) | Tenho (yellow card) 5'; Radulović 50'; Murilo (yellow card) 70' | Report | Chorý 6' (pen.); Kopic 57' (yellow card) 76'; Bucha (yellow card) 60'; Mosquera (yellow card) 84' | Stadium: Bolt Arena; Attendance: 5,236; Referee: Nikola Dabanović (Montenegro) |

| 26 July 2022 Second Qualifying Round 2nd leg | Viktoria Plzeň (Czech Republic) | 5 – 0 (7 – 1 agg.) | (Finland) HJK | Plzeň, Czech Republic |
| 20:00 EEST (UTC+3) | Pernica 11'; Sýkora 21', 73'; Hejda 31' (yellow card) 34'; Kliment 84' | Report | | Stadium: Doosan Arena; Attendance: 10,810; Referee: Aleksandar Stavrev (North Macedonia) |

=== UEFA Europa League ===
==== Qualifying rounds ====
| 4 August 2022 Third qualifying round 1st leg | Maribor (Slovenia) | 0 – 2 | (Finland) HJK | Maribor, Slovenia |
| 21:15 EEST (UTC+3) | Mitrović (yellow card) 53'; Repas (yellow card) 76' | Report | Browne (yellow card) 37' (goal) 47'; Väänänen (yellow card) 38'; Abubakari (yellow card) 60'; Radulović 64' | Stadium: Ljudski vrt Attendance: 6,000; Referee: Georgi Kabakov (Bulgaria) |

| 11 August 2022 Third qualifying round 2nd leg | HJK (Finland) | 1 – 0 (3 – 0 agg.) | (Slovenia) Maribor | Helsinki, Finland |
| 19:00 EEST (UTC+3) | Radulović (yellow card) 10'; Hostikka 54'; Browne (yellow card) 90+2' | Report | Repas (yellow card) 14'; Mitrović (yellow card) 21'; Antolin (yellow card) 84'; Karič (yellow card) 90' | Stadium: Bolt Arena; Attendance: 6,487; Referee: Tobias Stieler (Germany) |

| 18 August 2022 Play-off round 1st leg | HJK (Finland) | 1 – 0 | (Denmark) Silkeborg | Helsinki, Finland |
| 19:00 EEST (UTC+3) | Browne 79'; Radulović (yellow card) 82'; Tenho (yellow card) 90+2' | Report | Calisir (yellow card) 28' (red card) 68'; Salquist (yellow card) 61' | Stadium: Bolt Arena; Attendance: 8,237; Referee: João Pinheiro (Portugal) |

| 25 August 2022 Play-off round 2nd leg | Silkeborg (Denmark) | 1 – 1 (1 – 2 agg.) | (Finland) HJK | Silkeborg, Denmark |
| 19:30 EEST (UTC+3) | Þórðarson (yellow card) 45'; Sonne (yellow card) 47'; Kaalund (yellow card) 70'; Felix 74' | Report | Abubakari 40'; Murilo (yellow card) 42'; Hazard (yellow card) 88'; Raitala (yellow card) 90+2' | Stadium: Silkeborg Stadium; Attendance: 6,334; Referee: Maurizio Mariani (Italy) |

==== Group stage ====
| Pos | Team | Pld | W | D | L | GF | GA | GD | Pts | Qualification |
|---|---|---|---|---|---|---|---|---|---|---|
| 1 | (Spain) Real Betis | 6 | 5 | 1 | 0 | 12 | 4 | +8 | 16 | Advance to round of 16 |
| 2 | (Italy) Roma | 6 | 3 | 1 | 2 | 11 | 7 | +4 | 10 | Advance to knockout round play-offs |
| 3 | (Bulgaria) Ludogorets Razgrad | 6 | 2 | 1 | 3 | 8 | 9 | −1 | 7 | Transfer to Europa Conference League |
| 4 | (Finland) HJK | 6 | 0 | 1 | 5 | 2 | 13 | −11 | 1 | |

Source: UEFA
Rules for classification: Group stage tiebreakers

| 8 September 2022 1 | HJK (Finland) | 0 – 2 | (Spain) Real Betis | Helsinki, Finland |
| 19:45 EEST (UTC+3) | Boujellab (yellow card) 45+2' | Report | Ruiz (yellow card) 25'; Willian José 45+3' (pen.), 64'; Pezzella (yellow card) 48'; Luiz Felipe (yellow card) 48' | Stadium: Bolt Arena; Attendance: 10,164; Referee: Roi Reinshreiber (Israel) |

| 15 September 2022 2 | Roma (Italy) | 3 – 0 | (Finland) HJK | Rome, Italy |
| 22:00 EEST (UTC+3) | Ibañez (yellow card) 25'; Dybala 47'; Pellegrini 49'; Cristante (yellow card) 60'; Belotti 68' | Report | Tenho (red card) 14'; Hetemaj (yellow card) 29' | Stadium: Stadio Olimpico; Attendance: 60,193; Referee: Radu Petrescu (Romania) |

| 6 October 2022 3 | HJK (Finland) | 1 – 1 | (Bulgaria) Ludogorets Razgrad | Helsinki, Finland |
| 19:45 EEST (UTC+3) | Hostikka (yellow card) 51'; Hetemaj 55'; Raitala (yellow card) 58'; Boujellab (yellow card) 86' | Report | Tissera 10'; Piotrowski (yellow card) 80' | Stadium: Bolt Arena; Attendance: 9,751; Referee: Yevhen Aranovskyi (Ukraine) |

| 13 October 2022 4 | Ludogorets Razgrad (Bulgaria) | 2 – 0 | (Finland) HJK | Razgrad, Bulgaria |
| 22:00 EEST (UTC+3) | Gropper 38'; Cicinho (yellow card) 45+2'; Rick 64' | Report | Browne (yellow card) 33'; Raitala (yellow card) 55' (yellow-red card) 90+3'; Terho (yellow card) 73'; Hetemaj (yellow card) 83' | Stadium: Huvepharma Arena; Attendance: 4,623; Referee: Kristo Tohver (Estonia) |

| 27 October 2022 5 | HJK (Finland) | 1 – 2 | (Italy) Roma | Helsinki, Finland |
| 22:00 EEST (UTC+3) | Halme (yellow card) 34'; Hetemaj 54'; Abubakari (yellow card) 82' | Report | Mancini (yellow card) 22'; Abraham 41'; Hoskonen 62' (o.g.); Patrício (yellow card) 81'; Spinazzola (yellow card) 90+4' | Stadium: Bolt Arena; Attendance: 9,751; Referee: Tiago Martins (Portugal) |

| 3 November 2022 6 | Real Betis (Spain) | 3 – 0 | (Finland) HJK | Seville, Spain |
| 22:00 EET (UTC+2) | Ruibal 20', 40' (yellow card) 34'; González (yellow card) 48'; Fekir 90+3' | Report | | Stadium: Estadio Benito Villamarín; Attendance: 35,384; Referee: Willie Collum (Scotland) |

== Squad statistics ==
As of match played 3 November 2022

=== Appearances and goals ===
| No. | Pos | Nat | Player | Total | | Veikkausliiga | | Finnish Cup | | League Cup | | UEFA Champions League | | UEFA Europa League | |
| No. | Pos | Nat | Player | Apps | Goals | Apps | Goals | Apps | Goals | Apps | Goals | Apps | Goals | Apps | Goals |
|---|---|---|---|---|---|---|---|---|---|---|---|---|---|---|---|
| 1 | GK | (Northern Ireland) NIR | Conor Hazard | 39 | 0 | 24 | 0 | 0 | 0 | 1 | 0 | 4 | 0 | 10 | 0 |
| 2 | DF | (Finland) FIN | Paulus Arajuuri | 4 | 0 | 2 | 0 | 0 | 0 | 0 | 0 | 0+1 | 0 | 0+1 | 0 |
| 3 | DF | (Finland) FIN | Janne Saksela | 3 | 0 | 1+1 | 0 | 0+1 | 0 | 0 | 0 | 0 | 0 | 0 | 0 |
| 4 | DF | (Finland) FIN | Joona Toivio | 15 | 0 | 8+3 | 0 | 1 | 0 | 2 | 0 | 0 | 0 | 0+1 | 0 |
| 5 | DF | (Finland) FIN | Arttu Hoskonen | 36 | 3 | 16+5 | 3 | 2 | 0 | 0 | 0 | 4 | 0 | 9 | 0 |
| 6 | DF | (Finland) FIN | Aapo Halme | 5 | 2 | 2 | 1 | 0 | 0 | 0 | 0 | 0 | 0 | 2+1 | 1 |
| 7 | FW | (Finland) FIN | Santeri Hostikka | 36 | 4 | 11+9 | 2 | 0+3 | 0 | 0 | 0 | 2+1 | 0 | 10 | 2 |
| 8 | MF | (Finland) FIN | Lucas Lingman | 17 | 2 | 5+2 | 0 | 0 | 0 | 0 | 0 | 0 | 0 | 10 | 2 |
| 9 | FW | (Finland) FIN | Riku Riski | 2 | 0 | 1 | 0 | 0 | 0 | 1 | 0 | 0 | 0 | 0 | 0 |
| 10 | MF | (Morocco) MAR | Nassim Boujellab | 32 | 1 | 16+4 | 1 | 2+1 | 0 | 0 | 0 | 0+1 | 0 | 2+6 | 0 |
| 11 | FW | (Finland) FIN | Roope Riski | 7 | 5 | 1+1 | 0 | 1+1 | 1 | 2+1 | 4 | 0 | 0 | 0 | 0 |
| 12 | GK | (Sweden) SWE | Jakob Tånnander | 8 | 0 | 3 | 0 | 3 | 0 | 2 | 0 | 0 | 0 | 0 | 0 |
| 14 | DF | (Finland) FIN | Matti Peltola | 32 | 0 | 12+3 | 0 | 2+1 | 0 | 1+1 | 0 | 3+1 | 0 | 4+4 | 0 |
| 15 | DF | (Finland) FIN | Miro Tenho | 36 | 2 | 20+1 | 2 | 1+1 | 0 | 3 | 0 | 4 | 0 | 6 | 0 |
| 16 | DF | (Finland) FIN | Valtteri Moren | 8 | 0 | 4 | 0 | 2 | 0 | 1+1 | 0 | 0 | 0 | 0 | 0 |
| 17 | MF | (Austria) AUT | Manuel Martic | 17 | 2 | 5+5 | 1 | 3 | 0 | 0+3 | 0 | 1 | 1 | 0 | 0 |
| 18 | FW | (Serbia) SRB | Bojan Radulović | 36 | 10 | 14+9 | 8 | 2 | 0 | 1+1 | 1 | 4 | 1 | 1+4 | 0 |
| 19 | MF | (Finland) FIN | Casper Terho | 37 | 5 | 20+6 | 4 | 2 | 1 | 1+2 | 0 | 0+3 | 0 | 0+3 | 0 |
| 20 | DF | (Brazil) BRA | Murilo | 33 | 2 | 13+6 | 0 | 2+1 | 0 | 0+2 | 0 | 4 | 1 | 4+1 | 1 |
| 21 | MF | (Finland) FIN | Santeri Väänänen | 28 | 1 | 8+5 | 1 | 0 | 0 | 1+1 | 0 | 3 | 0 | 10 | 0 |
| 22 | DF | (Finland) FIN | Jukka Raitala | 40 | 0 | 21+2 | 0 | 1 | 0 | 2+1 | 0 | 4 | 0 | 9 | 0 |
| 23 | DF | (Finland) FIN | Pyry Soiri | 29 | 1 | 7+8 | 1 | 1 | 0 | 0 | 0 | 2+2 | 0 | 6+3 | 0 |
| 24 | FW | (Papua New Guinea) PNG | David Browne | 40 | 2 | 15+7 | 2 | 0+2 | 0 | 3 | 0 | 3 | 0 | 10 | 0 |
| 27 | DF | (Finland) FIN | Kevin Kouassivi-Benissan | 2 | 0 | 0 | 0 | 0 | 0 | 1+1 | 0 | 0 | 0 | 0 | 0 |
| 28 | DF | (Finland) FIN | Miska Ylitolva | 7 | 0 | 1+3 | 0 | 0 | 0 | 2+1 | 0 | 0 | 0 | 0 | 0 |
| 29 | FW | (Finland) FIN | Anthony Olusanya | 37 | 7 | 10+11 | 7 | 3 | 0 | 0+1 | 0 | 1+1 | 0 | 2+8 | 0 |
| 37 | MF | (Japan) JPN | Atomu Tanaka | 28 | 1 | 12+7 | 1 | 1 | 0 | 0+2 | 0 | 0 | 0 | 2+4 | 0 |
| 41 | FW | (Brazil) BRA | Tiquinho | 1 | 1 | 0 | 0 | 0 | 0 | 1 | 1 | 0 | 0 | 0 | 0 |
| 42 | FW | (Finland) FIN | Dylan Hayes | 1 | 0 | 0 | 0 | 0 | 0 | 0+1 | 0 | 0 | 0 | 0 | 0 |
| 43 | MF | (Finland) FIN | Viggo Blummé | 1 | 0 | 0 | 0 | 0 | 0 | 1 | 0 | 0 | 0 | 0 | 0 |
| 44 | FW | (Netherlands) NED | Fabian Serrarens | 24 | 1 | 11+5 | 0 | 2 | 0 | 3 | 1 | 0+2 | 0 | 0+1 | 0 |
| 47 | MF | (Finland) FIN | Oscar Häggström | 1 | 0 | 0 | 0 | 0 | 0 | 1 | 0 | 0 | 0 | 0 | 0 |
| 51 | FW | (Finland) FIN | Kaius Hardén | 1 | 0 | 0 | 0 | 0 | 0 | 1 | 0 | 0 | 0 | 0 | 0 |
| 52 | MF | (Finland) FIN | Aaro Toivonen | 1 | 0 | 0+1 | 0 | 0 | 0 | 0 | 0 | 0 | 0 | 0 | 0 |
| 54 | FW | (São Tomé and Príncipe) STP | Ricardo Cardoso | 1 | 0 | 0 | 0 | 0 | 0 | 1 | 0 | 0 | 0 | 0 | 0 |
| 56 | MF | (Finland) FIN | Përparim Hetemaj | 29 | 2 | 9+7 | 2 | 0+1 | 0 | 0 | 0 | 3+1 | 0 | 4+4 | 0 |
| 58 | MF | (Finland) FIN | Johannes Yli-Kokko | 26 | 4 | 10+7 | 1 | 2 | 2 | 1+2 | 1 | 0+2 | 0 | 0+2 | 0 |
| 61 | MF | (Finland) FIN | Niilo Kujasalo | 1 | 0 | 0 | 0 | 0 | 0 | 1 | 0 | 0 | 0 | 0 | 0 |
| 62 | FW | (Finland) FIN | Otto Hannula | 1 | 0 | 0 | 0 | 0 | 0 | 0+1 | 0 | 0 | 0 | 0 | 0 |
| 63 | MF | (Brazil) BRA | Luigi Morães | 1 | 0 | 0 | 0 | 0 | 0 | 0+1 | 0 | 0 | 0 | 0 | 0 |
| 64 | DF | (Finland) FIN | Taavi Arminen | 1 | 0 | 0 | 0 | 0 | 0 | 1 | 0 | 0 | 0 | 0 | 0 |
| 65 | FW | (Finland) FIN | Anton Aaltonen | 1 | 0 | 0 | 0 | 0 | 0 | 1 | 0 | 0 | 0 | 0 | 0 |
| 67 | MF | (Finland) FIN | Daniel Rökman | 1 | 0 | 0 | 0 | 0 | 0 | 1 | 0 | 0 | 0 | 0 | 0 |
| 74 | DF | (Ghana) GHA | Abubakar Haruna | 1 | 0 | 0 | 0 | 0 | 0 | 1 | 0 | 0 | 0 | 0 | 0 |
| 77 | FW | (Ghana) GHA | Malik Abubakari | 23 | 2 | 5+6 | 1 | 0 | 0 | 0 | 0 | 2 | 0 | 9+1 | 1 |
| 79 | GK | (Finland) FIN | Matias Niemelä | 1 | 0 | 0 | 0 | 0 | 0 | 1 | 0 | 0 | 0 | 0 | 0 |
Players from Klubi-04 who appeared:
Players away from the club on loan:
Players who left HJK during the season:
| 6 | MF | (Brazil) BRA | Jair | 14 | 2 | 10+1 | 2 | 0 | 0 | 3 | 0 | 0 | 0 | 0 | 0 |
| 88 | MF | (Finland) FIN | Pyry Hannola | 3 | 0 | 0 | 0 | 0 | 0 | 2+1 | 0 | 0 | 0 | 0 | 0 |

=== Goal scorers ===
| Place | Position | Nation | Number | Name | Veikkausliiga | Finnish Cup | League Cup | UEFA Champions League | UEFA Europa League | Total |
|---|---|---|---|---|---|---|---|---|---|---|
| 1 | FW | (Serbia) | 18 | Bojan Radulović | 8 | 0 | 1 | 1 | 1 | 11 |
| 2 | FW | (Finland) | 29 | Anthony Olusanya | 7 | 0 | 0 | 0 | 0 | 7 |
| 3 | MF | (Finland) | 19 | Casper Terho | 4 | 1 | 0 | 0 | 0 | 5 |
| 3 | FW | (Finland) | 11 | Roope Riski | 0 | 1 | 4 | 0 | 0 | 5 |
| 5 | MF | (Finland) | 56 | Përparim Hetemaj | 2 | 0 | 0 | 0 | 2 | 4 |
| 5 | FW | (Papua New Guinea) | 24 | David Browne | 2 | 0 | 0 | 0 | 2 | 4 |
| 5 | MF | (Finland) | 58 | Johannes Yli-Kokko | 1 | 2 | 1 | 0 | 0 | 4 |
| 8 | DF | (Finland) | 5 | Arttu Hoskonen | 3 | 0 | 0 | 0 | 0 | 3 |
| 8 | FW | (Finland) | 7 | Santeri Hostikka | 2 | 0 | 0 | 0 | 1 | 3 |
| 10 | DF | (Finland) | 15 | Miro Tenho | 2 | 0 | 0 | 0 | 0 | 2 |
| 10 | MF | (Brazil) | 6 | Jair | 2 | 0 | 0 | 0 | 0 | 2 |
| 10 | MF | (Austria) | 17 | Manuel Martic | 1 | 0 | 0 | 1 | 0 | 2 |
| 10 | FW | (Ghana) | 77 | Malik Abubakari | 1 | 0 | 0 | 0 | 1 | 2 |
| 14 | DF | (Finland) | 6 | Aapo Halme | 1 | 0 | 0 | 0 | 0 | 1 |
| 14 | MF | (Finland) | 23 | Pyry Soiri | 1 | 0 | 0 | 0 | 0 | 1 |
| 14 | MF | (Morocco) | 10 | Nassim Boujellab | 1 | 0 | 0 | 0 | 0 | 1 |
| 14 | MF | (Finland) | 21 | Santeri Väänänen | 1 | 0 | 0 | 0 | 0 | 1 |
| 14 | MF | (Finland) | 37 | Atomu Tanaka | 1 | 0 | 0 | 0 | 0 | 1 |
| 14 | FW | (Brazil) | 41 | Tiquinho | 0 | 0 | 1 | 0 | 0 | 1 |
| 14 | FW | (Netherlands) | 44 | Fabian Serrarens | 0 | 0 | 1 | 0 | 0 | 1 |
| 14 | DF | (Brazil) | 20 | Murilo | 0 | 0 | 0 | 1 | 0 | 1 |
| 14 | | | | Own goal | 1 | 0 | 0 | 0 | 0 | 1 |
| TOTALS | | | | | 41 | 4 | 8 | 3 | 7 | 63 |

=== Clean sheets ===
| Place | Position | Nation | Number | Name | Veikkausliiga | Finnish Cup | League Cup | UEFA Champions League | UEFA Europa League | Total |
|---|---|---|---|---|---|---|---|---|---|---|
| 1 | GK | (Northern Ireland) | 1 | Conor Hazard | 10 | 0 | 0 | 1 | 3 | 14 |
| 2 | GK | (Sweden) | 12 | Jakob Tånnander | 1 | 3 | 0 | 0 | 0 | 4 |
| TOTALS | | | | | 11 | 3 | 0 | 1 | 3 | 18 |

=== Disciplinary record ===
| Number | Nation | Position | Name | Veikkausliiga | | Finnish Cup | | League Cup | | UEFA Champions League | | UEFA Europa League | | Total | |
| Number | Nation | Position | Name | Booked | Sent off (straight red) | Booked | Sent off (straight red) | Booked | Sent off (straight red) | Booked | Sent off (straight red) | Booked | Sent off (straight red) | Booked | Sent off (straight red) |
| 1 | (Northern Ireland) | GK | Conor Hazard | 1 | 0 | 0 | 0 | 0 | 0 | 0 | 0 | 1 | 0 | 2 | 0 |
| 2 | (Finland) | DF | Paulus Arajuuri | 1 | 0 | 0 | 0 | 0 | 0 | 0 | 0 | 0 | 0 | 1 | 0 |
| 4 | (Finland) | DF | Joona Toivio | 2 | 0 | 0 | 0 | 0 | 0 | 0 | 0 | 0 | 0 | 2 | 0 |
| 5 | (Finland) | DF | Arttu Hoskonen | 2 | 0 | 0 | 0 | 0 | 0 | 0 | 0 | 0 | 0 | 2 | 0 |
| 6 | (Finland) | DF | Aapo Halme | 0 | 0 | 0 | 0 | 0 | 0 | 0 | 0 | 1 | 0 | 0 | 0 |
| 7 | (Finland) | FW | Santeri Hostikka | 2 | 0 | 0 | 0 | 0 | 0 | 0 | 0 | 1 | 0 | 3 | 0 |
| 8 | (Finland) | MF | Lucas Lingman | 2 | 0 | 0 | 0 | 0 | 0 | 0 | 0 | 0 | 0 | 2 | 0 |
| 10 | (Morocco) | MF | Nassim Boujellab | 4 | 0 | 2 | 0 | 0 | 0 | 0 | 0 | 2 | 0 | 8 | 0 |
| 14 | (Finland) | MF | Matti Peltola | 2 | 0 | 0 | 0 | 0 | 0 | 1 | 0 | 0 | 0 | 3 | 0 |
| 15 | (Finland) | DF | Miro Tenho | 4 | 0 | 0 | 0 | 1 | 0 | 2 | 0 | 1 | 1 | 8 | 1 |
| 17 | (Austria) | MF | Manuel Martic | 2 | 0 | 0 | 0 | 1 | 0 | 0 | 0 | 0 | 0 | 3 | 0 |
| 18 | (Serbia) | FW | Bojan Radulović | 2 | 1 | 0 | 0 | 0 | 0 | 1 | 0 | 2 | 0 | 5 | 1 |
| 19 | (Finland) | MF | Casper Terho | 1 | 0 | 0 | 0 | 0 | 0 | 0 | 0 | 1 | 0 | 2 | 0 |
| 20 | (Brazil) | DF | Murilo | 3 | 0 | 1 | 0 | 0 | 0 | 2 | 0 | 1 | 0 | 7 | 0 |
| 21 | (Finland) | MF | Santeri Väänänen | 3 | 0 | 0 | 0 | 0 | 0 | 1 | 0 | 1 | 0 | 5 | 0 |
| 22 | (Finland) | DF | Jukka Raitala | 4 | 0 | 0 | 0 | 0 | 0 | 0 | 0 | 4 | 1 | 8 | 1 |
| 23 | (Finland) | MF | Pyry Soiri | 2 | 0 | 0 | 0 | 0 | 0 | 0 | 0 | 0 | 0 | 2 | 0 |
| 24 | (Papua New Guinea) | FW | David Browne | 1 | 0 | 0 | 0 | 1 | 0 | 0 | 0 | 3 | 0 | 5 | 0 |
| 29 | (Finland) | FW | Anthony Olusanya | 1 | 0 | 0 | 0 | 0 | 0 | 0 | 0 | 0 | 0 | 1 | 0 |
| 37 | (Japan) | MF | Atomu Tanaka | 2 | 0 | 0 | 0 | 0 | 0 | 0 | 0 | 0 | 0 | 2 | 0 |
| 44 | (Netherlands) | FW | Fabian Serrarens | 1 | 0 | 0 | 0 | 0 | 0 | 0 | 0 | 0 | 0 | 1 | 0 |
| 56 | (Finland) | MF | Përparim Hetemaj | 2 | 0 | 0 | 0 | 0 | 0 | 1 | 0 | 2 | 0 | 5 | 0 |
| 58 | (Finland) | MF | Johannes Yli-Kokko | 3 | 0 | 0 | 0 | 0 | 0 | 0 | 0 | 0 | 0 | 3 | 0 |
| 67 | (Finland) | MF | Daniel Rökman | 0 | 0 | 0 | 0 | 1 | 0 | 0 | 0 | 0 | 0 | 0 | 0 |
| 74 | (Ghana) | DF | Abubakar Haruna | 0 | 0 | 0 | 0 | 1 | 0 | 0 | 0 | 0 | 0 | 0 | 0 |
| 77 | (Ghana) | FW | Malik Abubakari | 1 | 0 | 0 | 0 | 0 | 0 | 0 | 0 | 2 | 0 | 3 | 0 |
Players away on loan:
Players who left HJK during the season:
| TOTALS | | | | 48 | 1 | 3 | 0 | 5 | 0 | 8 | 0 | 22 | 2 | 78 | 3 |
