= Hetemaj =

Hetemaj is a surname. Notable people with the surname include:

- Mehmet Hetemaj (born 1987), Albanian footballer
- Përparim Hetemaj (born 1986), Finnish footballer
