= Arajuuri =

Arajuuri is a Finnish surname. Notable people with the surname include:

- J. Arajuuri (fl. 1940s), Finnish soldier, commander of the Finnish 4th Division (Winter War)
- Paulus Arajuuri (born 1988), Finnish footballer
