= Abdou Talat =

Finnish-Egyptian football manager (born 1961)

Personal information
- Date of birth: 25 May 1961 (age 65)
- Place of birth: Cairo, Egypt

Managerial career
- Years: Team
- 2003: HIFK
- 2004: Honka
- 2005–2007: HJK (assistant)
- 2005–2007: Klubi 04
- 2008: Atlantis
- 2011–2014: Klubi 04
- 2015–2018: KäPa
- 2020: PuiU
- 2021–2022: KoiPS

Abdou Talat (born 25 May 1961) is Egyptian-born Finnish football coach and a former football player.

Talat played football in his native Egypt.

Talat started his coaching career in Finland in 2003 as a head coach of HIFK Fotboll. Next season he was named the head coach of Honka. Later he has worked for HJK Helsinki as an assistant coach of Keith Armstrong, and as the head coach of the reserve team Klubi 04.

For the 2008 season, he was named the head coach of Atlantis. He returned to HJK organisation in 2009 and during 2011–2014 he coached Klubi 04. During 2015–2018, Talat served as the head coach of Käpylän Pallo.

== Honours ==
Individual

- Ykkönen Manager of the Year: 2004
