= Mehmet Hetemaj =

Finnish footballer (born 1987)

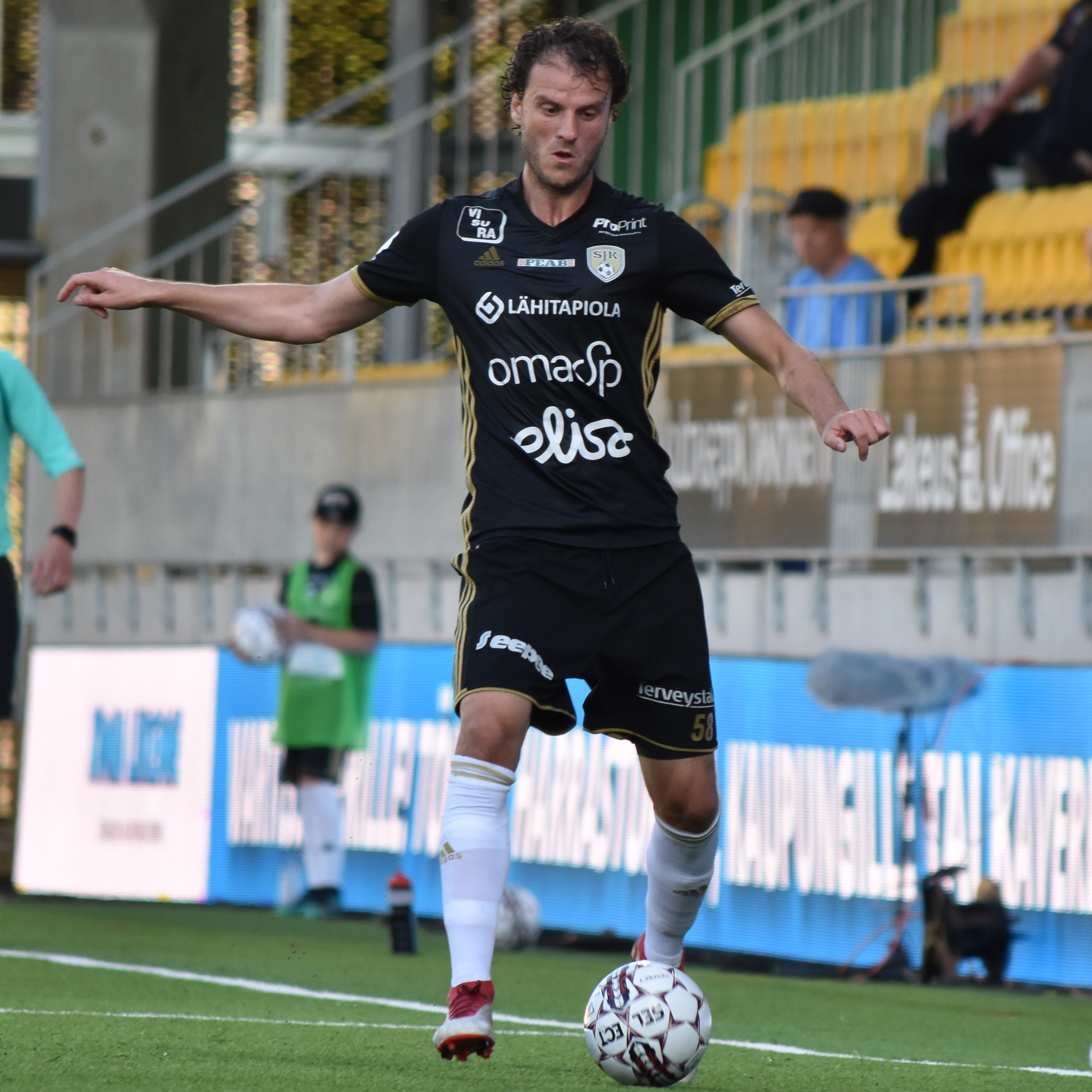
- Hetemaj with SJK in 2018.

Personal information
- Date of birth: 8 December 1987 (age 38)
- Place of birth: Skenderaj, SFR Yugoslavia (present-day Kosovo)
- Height: 1.85 m (6 ft 1 in)
- Position: Defensive midfielder

Youth career
- 1996–2006: HJK

Senior career*
Years	Team	Apps	(Gls)
2005–2007	HJK	17	(1)
2007	→ Viikingit (loan)	10	(0)
2008–2010	Panionios	11	(0)
2009	→ Thrasyvoulos (loan)	9	(0)
2009–2010	→ AlbinoLeffe (loan)	23	(1)
2010–2014	AlbinoLeffe	76	(0)
2012–2013	→ Reggina (loan)	29	(0)
2014	→ Honka (loan)	16	(1)
2014	Monza	17	(0)
2015–2022	SJK	156	(14)

International career
2007–2009	Finland U21	18	(2)
2014	Kosovo	1	(0)
2009–2017	Finland	6	(1)
- * Club domestic league appearances and goals

Mehmet Hetemaj (born 8 December 1987) is a Finnish football commentator and a former professional footballer who played as a defensive midfielder. Born in Yugoslavia, he has represented both Finland national team and Kosovo national football team. He started his football career in HJK youth team.

== Club career ==
=== HJK Helsinki ===
Hetemaj started his career in Finland in HJK Helsinki where he made 17 appearances between 2006 and 2007. During 2007 season he was loaned to Viikingit for 9 matches.

=== Panionios ===
In 2008, he agreed a move to Greek club Panionios F.C. In June 2009 he was loaned out to Serie B outfit AlbinoLeffe, where he established himself as a regular.

=== AlbinoLeffe ===
In June 2010 AlbinoLeffe announced to have completed a bid to sign the player on a permanent basis from Panionios. He signed a four-year contract. In July 2012 he was loaned out to Serie B outfit Reggina Calcio. The loan contract with Reggina ended after the 2012–13 season and Hetemaj returned to AlbinoLeffe. In January 2014 it was announced that Hetemaj had signed a loan contract with a Finnish Premier League team Honka.

=== Monza ===
In July 2014 he joined Italian club Monza.

=== SJK ===
Hetemaj joined SJK in January 2015. Since then he has become a fan favorite and scored many important goals for the club. Hetemaj has been the clubs captain since 2019. Hetemaj announced his retirement from playing in December 2022.

== International career ==
=== Finland Under-21 ===
Hetemaj, along with his older brother Përparim Hetemaj, was called up to represent Finland U-21 at the 2009 UEFA European Under-21 Football Championship.

=== Finland ===
Hetemaj made his senior debut for Finland against Japan in February 2009. After a convincing season in AlbinoLeffe he was called up again on 21 May 2010 for a match against Estonia.

=== Kosovo ===
Hetemaj made his senior debut for Kosovo in a 6–1 loss against Turkey in May 2014, a friendly match. However, he lost his eligibility to switch over to Kosovo for competitive matches after accepting new call-ups from Finland in 2016, precisely when Kosovo became a member of UEFA and FIFA that year.

== Personal life ==
Of Kosovar Albanian descent, Hetemaj was born in Skenderaj, Socialist Federal Republic of Yugoslavia, and moved to Finland with his family as refugees in 1992. His family first arrived at Oulu but they moved to Helsinki, looking for a milder climate, due to his father, Miftar, having asthma. He has an older brother, the footballer Përparim, and two sisters, Fatlume and Fatbardhe.

== Later career ==
After his playing career, Hetemaj has worked as a studio commentator in Veikkausliiga matches in Ruutu+ broadcasts since 2023, in European final tournament matches for Yle, and in UEFA Champions League matches for MTV since 2024.

== Career statistics ==
=== Club ===
As of 25 July 2016

Club	Season	Division	League		Domestic Cups		Europe		Total	
Club	Season	Division	Apps	Goals	Apps	Goals	Apps	Goals	Apps	Goals
Klubi-04	2005	Kakkonen	16	0	0	0	–		16	0
Klubi-04	2006	Ykkönen	13	2	0	0	–		13	2
Klubi-04	Total		29	2	0	0	0	0	29	2
HJK Helsinki	2006	Veikkausliiga	9	0	0	0	0	0	9	0
HJK Helsinki	2007	Veikkausliiga	8	1	0	0	0	0	8	1
HJK Helsinki	Total		17	1	0	0	0	0	17	1
Viikingit (loan)	2007	Veikkausliiga	9	0	0	0	–		9	0
Panionios	2007–08	Super League Greece	5	0	0	0	–		5	0
Thrasyvoulos (loan)	2008–09	Super League Greece	9	0	0	0	–		9	0
AlbinoLeffe	2009–10	Serie B	23	1	1	0	–		24	1
AlbinoLeffe	2010–11	Serie B	36	0	2	0	–		38	0
AlbinoLeffe	2011–12	Serie B	35	0	2	0	–		37	0
AlbinoLeffe	2013–14	Lega Pro	5	0	0	0	–		5	0
AlbinoLeffe	Total		99	1	5	0	0	0	104	1
Reggina (loan)	2012–13	Serie B	29	0	2	0	–		31	0
Honka (loan)	2014	Veikkausliiga	16	1	3	1	2	0	21	2
Monza	2014–15	Lega Pro	17	0	2	0	–		19	0
SJK	2015	Veikkausliiga	31	2	4	0	2	0	37	2
SJK	2016	Veikkausliiga	17	1	4	0	2	0	23	1
SJK	2017	Veikkausliiga	22	2	8	6	2	0	31	8
SJK	2018	Veikkausliiga	23	3	6	1	–		29	4
SJK	2019	Veikkausliiga	22	2	4	0	–		26	2
SJK	2020	Veikkausliiga	17	4	5	0	–		22	4
SJK	2021	Veikkausliiga	10	0	4	0	–		14	0
SJK	2022	Veikkausliiga	14	0	5	1	4	0	23	1
SJK	Total		156	14	40	8	10	0	206	22
Career total			384	19	53	9	12	0	451	28

=== International ===
As of 7 June 2017

Finland national team
Year	Apps	Goals
2009	1	0
2010	1	0
2011	0	0
2012	0	0
2013	0	0
2014	1	0
2015	0	0
2016	2	0
2017	1	1
Total	6	1

=== International goals ===
Scores and results list Finland's goal tally first.

No	Date	Venue	Opponent	Score	Result	Competition
1.	7 June 2017	Veritas Stadion, Turku, Finland	Liechtenstein	1–0	1–1	Friendly

== Honours ==
HJK Helsinki

- Finnish Cup: 2006
