= Daniel Rökman =

Finnish footballer (born 2004)

Personal information
- Full name: Daniel Rökman
- Date of birth: 20 March 2004 (age 22)
- Place of birth: Finland
- Height: 1.77 m (5 ft 10 in)
- Position: Winger

Youth career
- –2016: Puistolan Urheilijat
- 2016: MPS
- 2017: Legirus Inter
- 2018–2020: PK Keski-Uusimaa
- 2020–2021: HJK

Senior career*
Years	Team	Apps	(Gls)
2020	PK Keski-Uusimaa	14	(2)
2021–2022	Klubi 04	32	(6)
2021–2022	HJK	0	(0)
2023–2024	Inter Turku	16	(0)
2023	→ SalPa (loan)	4	(0)
2024	→ Inter Turku II	23	(6)
2025	PK Keski-Uusimaa	0	(0)

International career^{‡}
2019	Finland U16	4	(0)
2021–2022	Finland U18	4	(2)
2022	Finland U19	5	(0)
2024–	Finland U21	1	(0)
- * Club domestic league appearances and goals as of 23 October 2024 ‡ National team caps and goals as of 9 June 2024

Daniel Rökman (born 20 March 2004) is a Finnish professional footballer who plays as a winger for PK Keski-Uusimaa.

== Honours ==
Inter Turku

- Finnish Cup runner-up: 2024
- Finnish League Cup: 2024
