= Fatbardhe Hetemaj =

Finnish Politician

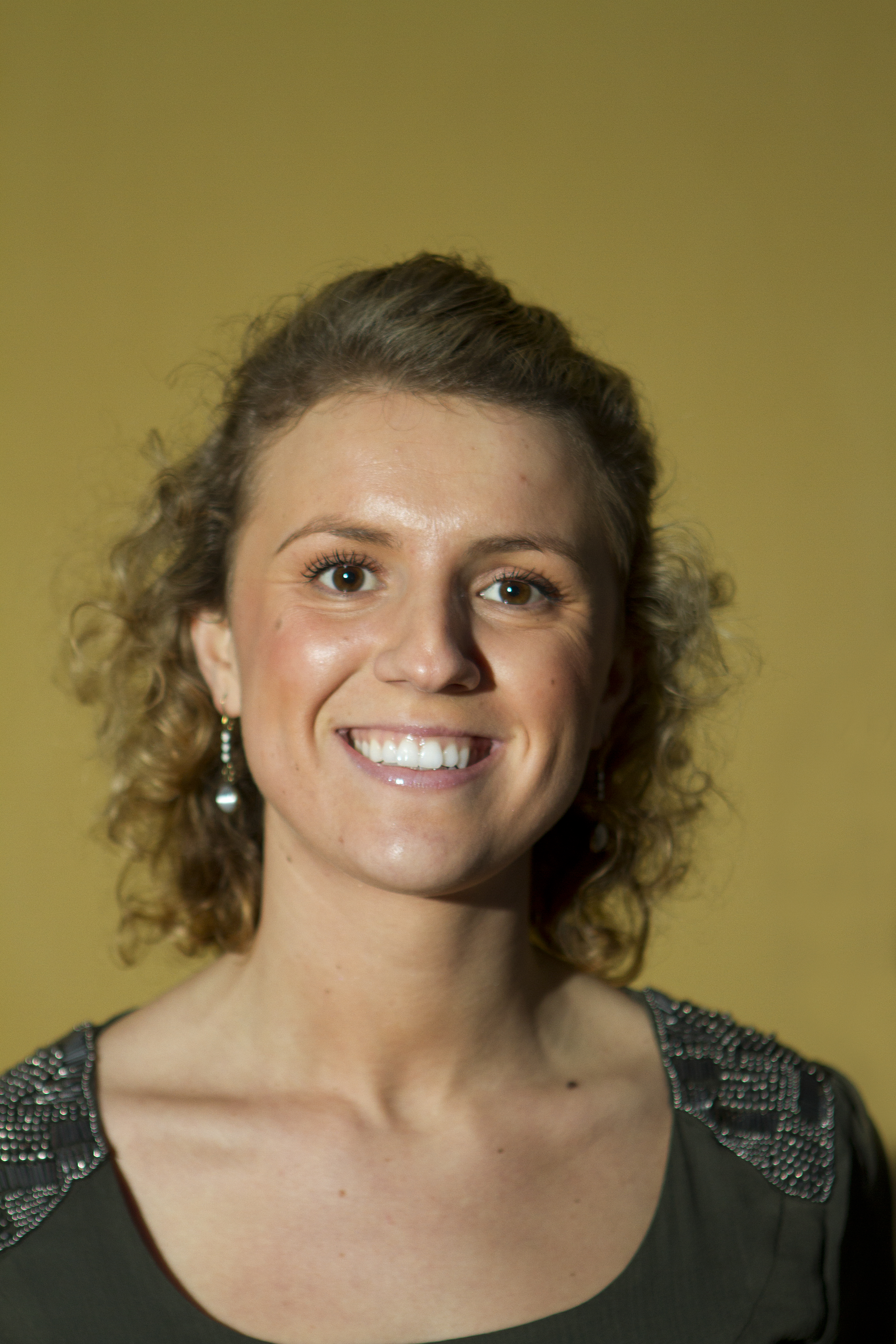
- Website: www.hetemaj.fi
- Position held: municipal councillor in Finland

Fatbardhe Hetemaj (born 20 August 1985) is a Kosovo-born Finnish politician, author, and 2009 "Refugee Woman of the Year".

Hetemaj was born to Emine and Miftar Hetemaj in Skenderaj, Kosovo, and she is of Kosovo Albanian descent. She has three siblings Përparim Hetemaj, Mehmet Hetemaj, and Fatlume Hetemaj. In the fall of 1992, Hetemaj and her family arrived in Finland after fleeing the regime of Slobodan Milosevic and lived in a refugee center in Oulu. From 2005 to 2008, she studied Business management and Combined studies at the University of Worcester. She graduated with a Bachelors of Arts with Honours in Business Management.

In 2009, the Finnish Refugee Council named Hetemaj "Refugee Woman of the Year" for her work against racism In 2010, she published her book "Matkalaukullinen aurinkoa : pakomatka pohjoiseen" (Sun in a suitcase: an escape to the north).

In 2011, she ran as a coalition candidate for the National Coalition Party but lost the election. In 2012, Hetemaj was elected as one do the City Councilors for the Helsinki City Council. On 28 July 2015, she appeared alongside Erkki Tuomioja, Ozan Yanar, and Paavo Arhinmäki at an event against racism in Helsinki that attracted nearly 15,000 people.

A documentary film about Hetemaj and her family premiered at the Refugee Film Festival in 2020.
