= Paulus Arajuuri =

Finnish footballer (born 1988)

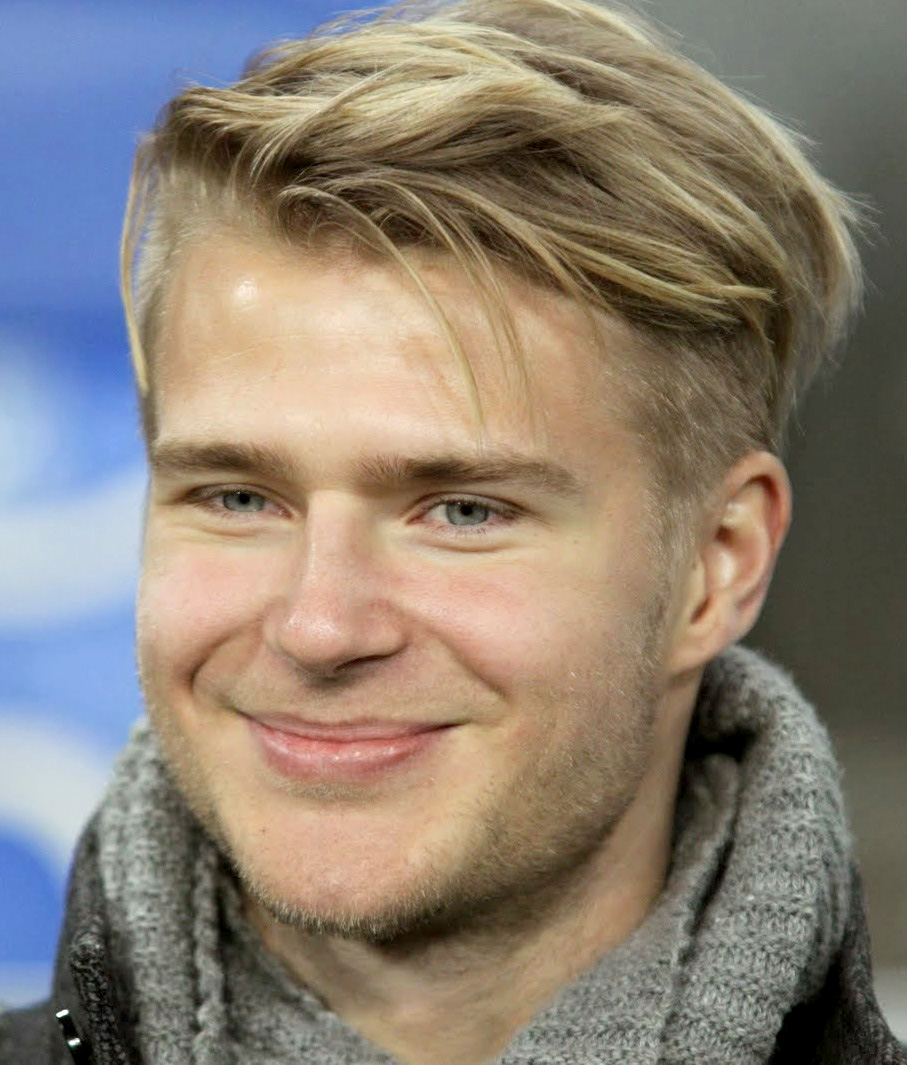
- Arajuuri in 2013

Personal information
- Date of birth: 15 June 1988 (age 38)
- Place of birth: Helsinki, Finland
- Height: 1.93 m (6 ft 4 in)
- Position: Centre-back

Youth career
- 1993–1999: Halkian Alku
- 2002–2003: NuPS
- 2004: Jokerit
- 2005: FC Espoo

Senior career*
Years	Team	Apps	(Gls)
2005	Espoo	8	(1)
2006	Honka	1	(0)
2006	→ Espoo (loan)	8	(2)
2007	Klubi 04	25	(0)
2008–2009	Mariehamn	48	(3)
2009–2013	Kalmar	56	(3)
2014–2016	Lech Poznań	70	(5)
2014	Lech Poznań II	2	(0)
2017–2019	Brøndby	67	(3)
2019–2021	Pafos	45	(3)
2021–2022	Anorthosis	25	(1)
2022	HJK	2	(0)
2023	HIFK	25	(3)
Total		382	(24)

International career
2008	Finland U20	3	(0)
2008–2010	Finland U21	12	(0)
2010–2021	Finland	58	(3)
Medal record
Finland national football team
Second place	Baltic Cup	2012
FC Espoo
Third place	Finnish League Division 2, Southern Group	2005
Kalmar FF
Second place	Svenska Cupen	2011
Lech Poznań
Second place	Ekstraklasa	2014
First place	Ekstraklasa	2015
Second place	Polish Cup	2015
First place	Polish Super Cup	2015
Brøndby IF
Second place	Danish Superliga	2018
- * Club domestic league appearances and goals

Paulus Verneri Arajuuri (born 15 June 1988) is a Finnish former professional footballer who played as a centre-back.

Beginning his senior career with FC Espoo in 2005, he later played for clubs across Finland, Sweden, Poland, Denmark, and Cyprus. Notably, he won the Polish Ekstraklasa and Polish Super Cup with Lech Poznań and achieved a Danish Cup victory with Brøndby. He announced his retirement in 2023 after finishing his career with HIFK in Finland.

Internationally, Arajuuri was capped 57 times for the Finland national team and was part of the squad that competed in UEFA Euro 2020.

== Club career ==
=== Early career ===
Arajuuri made his debut on senior level in the ranks of FC Espoo during the 2005 season of the third-tier Kakkonen. He gained eight caps and scored one goal.

During the 2006 season, he made his debut in the Veikkausliiga with FC Honka against rivals HJK Helsinki. In that season, he was also sent on loan back to FC Espoo for 8 matches.

For the season 2007 he joined HJK Helsinki. He did not make any appearances in the first team, but spent the whole season playing for the reserve team Klubi 04 in the second-tier Ykkönen.

=== IFK Mariehamn ===
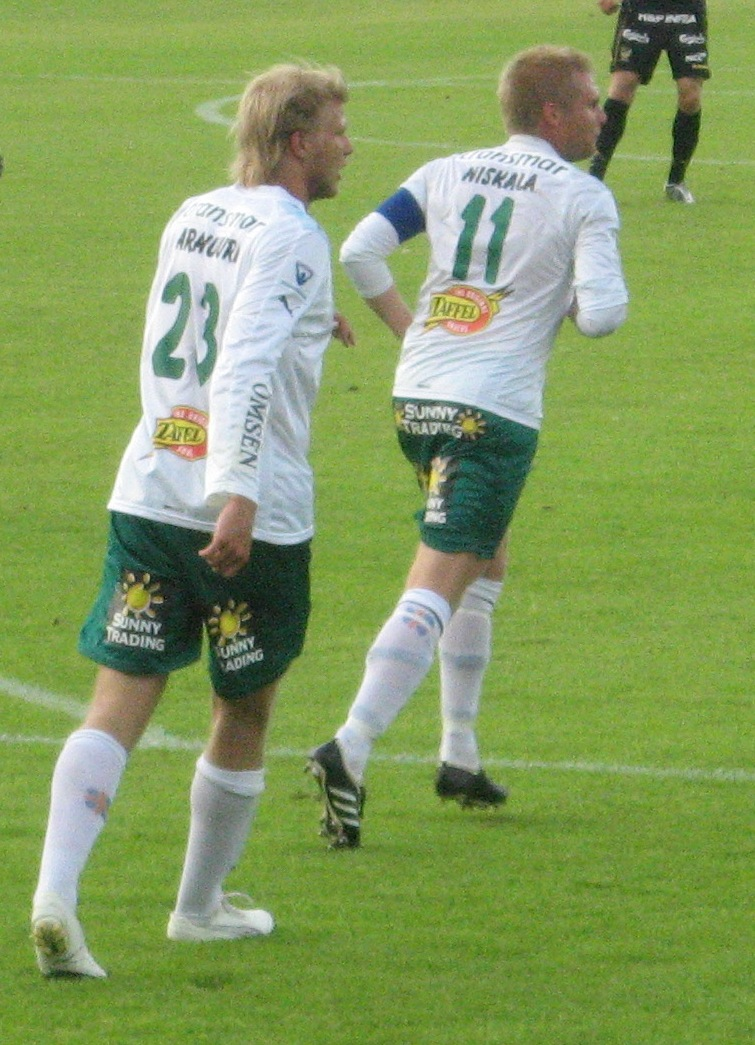
Arajuuri (left) and Mika Niskala at IFK Mariehamn

Originally from Helsinki, Arajuuri moved to Åland and their premier side, IFK Mariehamn, in 2008. During his first season with Mariehamn, he participated in all but two games, making it a total of 24 appearances.

During the summer of 2009, Arajuuri was frequently linked with a move to Sweden, especially to Djurgårdens IF. Arajuuri's player agent, Jonas Wirmola, admitted to one of the major newspapers of Åland that Djurgården and several other clubs had shown interest in the young Finnish defender.

=== Kalmar FF ===
Eventually, Arajuuri signed a four-year deal on a Bosman-transfer with the Swedish champions of 2008, Kalmar FF on 24 September 2009. He netted his first league goals for Kalmar FF at home against GAIS on 23 June 2011. He scored twice to help the Småland club earn a 2–1 win. Arajuuri played a total of ten matches during the 2011 Allsvenskan, nine of them in the starting line-up, as he scored two goals. Kalmar finished eighth in Allsvenskan, as they advanced to the final of the Svenska Cupen which was lost to Helsingborgs IF. However, through their cup final participation, Kalmar qualified for the UEFA Europa League qualifiers.

Arajuuri experienced a real breakthrough in Kalmar during the 2012 season, when he established himself in the starting line-up. Arajuuri played a total of 21 matches, all in the starting line-up. Arajuuri also appeared in all six qualifiers for Kalmar in the Europa League. Kalmar advanced to the third qualifying round, but the team was knocked out by Swiss club BSC Young Boys. Kalmar finished tenth in Allsvenskan.

Arajuuri continued as a starter during the 2013 season and he was also appointed captain of the Kalmar team. Arajuuri played 12 games, but his strong start was interrupted by a hip injury that kept him sidelined until the end of the season. Kalmar had a successful season in Allsvenskan, which ended in fourth place.

=== Lech Poznań ===
In accordance with an agreement reached in August 2013, Arajuuri joined Polish Ekstraklasa club Lech Poznań in January 2014 on a three-year contract. Arajuuri made his debut for Lech Poznań on 5 April 2014 in the home match against Jagiellonia Białystok. He made five appearances at the second half of the 2013–14 season, four of them in the starting line-up. Lech finished second in the Ekstraklasa behind Legia Warsaw who took the championship. Lech made it to the qualifiers for the next season's UEFA Europa League.

Arajuuri steadily made his way to become a permanent player in the starting line-up of Lech Poznań during the rest of 2014. He scored his first goal in the Ekstraklasa on 14 February 2015 in the 1–1 away draw against Pogoń Szczecin. During the 2014–15 season, Arajuuri made a total of 25 appearances, of which 24 were in the starting line-up. He scored three goals. Lech won the Ekstraklasa and the Polish Super Cup, and the team made it to the UEFA Champions League qualifiers the following season. Arajuuri also appeared in the Polish Cup final, which Lech however lost to Legia Warsaw.

Lech and Arajuuri's 2015–16 season began with European qualification. After being knocked out of the UEFA Champions League qualifiers, the team qualified for the Europa League group stage. Arajuuri made his debut in the Europa League on 17 September 2015 in the home match against Belenenses. However, the team finished third in the group behind FC Basel and Fiorentina. Arajuuri continued to appear as a key player of the team and played a total of 28 league matches, of which 27 were in the starting line-up. In addition, Arajuuri made three Europa League appearances. That season, Lech finished seventh in the Ekstraklasa.

During the autumn season 2016–17, Arajuuri made 12 appearances for the Lech Poznań first team, in which he scored two goals. Lech were in fifth place of the Ekstraklasa at the end of the autumn season.

=== Brøndby ===
In accordance with a pre-agreement made in July 2016, Arajuuri joined fellow Finn Teemu Pukki at Danish Superliga club Brøndby IF in January 2017. Arajuuri made his debut in the Superliga on 12 March 2017 in an away match against AC Horsens. He made eight matches during the spring season 2016–17, six of them in the starting line-up. Brøndby finished second in the Danish league after FC Copenhagen, who took the championship. Brøndby qualified for next season's UEFA Europa League qualifiers, and the team also made it to the Danish Cup final, which was lost to Copenhagen.

Arajuuri and Brøndby's 2017–18 season began with the qualifying matches of the Europa League, where they, among others, faced Finnish Veikkausliiga side Vaasan Palloseura. However, Brøndby were knocked out before reaching the group stage. Arajuuri consolidated his place in Brøndby's starting line-up and made a total of 28 Superliga matches as well as two Europa League qualifying matches. He scored his first goal in the Superliga on 3 December 2017 in a 1–3 away win over SønderjyskE. The team led the Superliga during large parts of the season, but finished second, as in the previous season, when FC Midtjylland won the championship. Brøndby again made it to the Europa League qualifiers, and the team went on to win the Danish Cup by beating Silkeborg IF in the final.

Arajuuri continued in Brøndby's starting line-up as a player in the 2018–19 season. Brøndby once again played in the Europa League qualifiers, where they were eventually knocked out by Genk before reaching the group stage. Arajuuri played a total of 26 league matches during the season, as well as three Europa League qualifiers. Brøndby finished fourth in the Superliga and reached the European League qualifiers after play-offs. Again, Brøndby reached the Danish Cup final at the end of the season, but this time lost to Midtjylland.

Arajuuri was part of the early part of Brøndby's 2019–20 season, making four appearances in the Danish Superliga and six appearances in the Europa League qualifiers, before being knocked out by Braga.

=== Pafos ===
In August 2019, Arajuuri moved to Pafos FC, playing in the top-tier Cypriot First Division, for an undisclosed fee. Arajuuri made his league debut on 30 August 2019 in the home match against AEK Larnaca. He immediately established himself in the starting lineup of Pafos and played a total of 17 league matches during the season. Arajuuri also served as the team captain. The 2019–20 Cypriot First Division season was interrupted in March 2020 due to the COVID-19 pandemic. In May, it was announced that the season would be abandoned. No title was awarded, and no teams were relegated, with the league expanded to 14 teams next season for a transitional year. At the point of abandonment, Pafos were seventh in the league after 23 matches.

=== Anorthosis Famagusta ===
On 30 June 2021, Arajuuri signed with Cypriot First Division club Anorthosis on a one-year deal.

=== HJK ===
On 15 July 2022, Arajuuri returned to Finland and signed with HJK.

=== HIFK ===
On 6 February 2023, Arajuuri signed a two-year contract with HIFK. After the 2023 season, he announced his retirement from professional football.

== International career ==
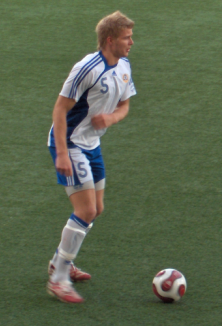
Arajuuri with the Finland U23 team in 2008

=== Finland youth teams ===
Arajuuri made his debut in the Finland national under-21 football team in a friendly against Poland in Jyväskylä on 3 June 2008. Arajuuri was called up to represent Finland in the U-21 national team qualifiers for the 2011 U-21 Euros. He was a part of the squad that faced the Netherlands and Poland in September 2009, and since that become a regular. Arajuuri has also represented Finland's U23 national team in the International Challenge Trophy.

=== Finland first team ===
Arajuuri earned his first cap for Finland in a friendly against South Korea on 18 January 2010 in Málaga, Spain. He came on as a substitute in the 84th minute. He scored his first goal for the national team on 11 October 2015 in a UEFA Euro 2016 qualification match against Northern Ireland.

Arajuuri was called up for the UEFA Euro 2020 pre-tournament friendly match against Sweden on 29 May 2021. He played in all three games of Finnish team during the championship, serving as a captain against Russia.

Along with fellow centre-back Joona Toivio, Arajuuri announced his retirement from international football following 2022 FIFA World Cup qualification match against France on 16 November 2021.

== Career statistics ==
=== Club ===
Appearances and goals by club, season and competition
Club	Season	League			National cup (Note: Includes Svenska Cupen, Polish Cup, Danish Cup, Cypriot Cup, Finnish Cup)		Europe		Other		Total	
Club	Season	Division	Apps	Goals	Apps	Goals	Apps	Goals	Apps	Goals	Apps	Goals
Espoo	2005	Kakkonen	8	1	—		—		—		8	1
Honka	2006	Veikkausliiga	1	0	—		—		—		1	0
Espoo (loan)	2006	Kakkonen	8	2	—		—		—		8	2
Klubi 04	2007	Ykkönen	25	1	—		—		—		25	1
IFK Mariehamn	2008	Veikkausliiga	24	1	—		—		—		24	1
IFK Mariehamn	2009	Veikkausliiga	21	1	0	0	—		5 (Note: Appearances in Finnish League Cup)	1	26	2
IFK Mariehamn	Total		45	2	0	0	0	0	5	1	50	3
Kalmar	2010	Allsvenskan	13	0	2	0	1 (Note: Appearance(s) in UEFA Europa League)	0	—		16	0
Kalmar	2011	Allsvenskan	10	2	1	0	0	0	—		11	2
Kalmar	2012	Allsvenskan	21	1	0	0	6	0	—		27	1
Kalmar	2013	Allsvenskan	12	0	3	0	0	0	—		15	0
Kalmar	Total		56	3	6	1	7	0	—		69	3
Lech Poznań	2013–14	Ekstraklasa	5	0	—		—		—		5	0
Lech Poznań	2014–15	Ekstraklasa	25	3	4	1	0	0	—		29	4
Lech Poznań	2015–16	Ekstraklasa	28	0	5	1	3	0	0	0	36	1
Lech Poznań	2016–17	Ekstraklasa	12	2	1	0	—		0	0	13	2
Lech Poznań	Total		70	5	10	2	3	0	—		83	7
Lech Poznań II	2013–14	III liga, group C	1	0	—		—		—		1	0
Lech Poznań II	2014–15	III liga, group C	1	0	—		—		—		1	0
Lech Poznań II	Total		2	0	—		—		—		2	0
Brøndby	2016–17	Danish Superliga	8	0	2	0	0	0	—		10	0
Brøndby	2017–18	Danish Superliga	28	2	3	0	2	0	—		33	2
Brøndby	2018–19	Danish Superliga	27	0	3	0	3	0	—		33	0
Brøndby	2019–20	Danish Superliga	4	1	0	0	6	1	—		10	2
Brøndby	Total		67	3	8	0	11	1	—		86	2
Pafos	2019–20	Cypriot First Division	17	2	3	0	0	0	—		20	2
Pafos	2020–21	Cypriot First Division	28	1	1	0	0	0	—		29	1
Pafos	Total		45	3	4	0	0	0	—		49	3
Anorthosis	2021–22	Cypriot First Division	25	1	3	0	10 (Note: Four appearances in UEFA Europa League, six appearances in UEFA Europa Conference League)	0	—		38	1
HJK Helsinki	2022	Veikkausliiga	2	0	0	0	2 (Note: One appearance in UEFA Champions League, one appearance in UEFA Europa League)	0	0	0	4	0
HIFK	2023	Ykkönen	25	3	1	0	—		2 (Note: Appearances in Ykkösliigacup)	0	28	3
Career total			379	24	31	3	33	1	7	1	450	30

=== International ===
Appearances and goals by national team and year
National team	Year	Apps	Goals
Finland
Finland	2010	1	0
Finland	2011	0	0
Finland	2012	2	0
Finland	2013	3	0
Finland	2014	0	0
Finland	2015	5	1
Finland	2016	9	1
Finland	2017	7	1
Finland	2018	8	0
Finland	2019	8	0
Finland	2020	5	0
Finland	2021	10	0
Total		58	3

Scores and results list Finland's goal tally first, score column indicates score after each Arajuuri goal.

List of international goals scored by Paulus Arajuuri
No.	Date	Venue	Opponent	Score	Result	Competition
1	11 October 2015	Helsinki Olympic Stadium, Helsinki, Finland	Northern Ireland	1–1	1–1	UEFA Euro 2016 qualifying
2	5 September 2016	Veritas Stadion, Turku, Finland	Kosovo	1–0	1–1	2018 FIFA World Cup qualification
3	9 October 2017	Veritas Stadion, Turku, Finland	Turkey	1–1	2–2	2018 FIFA World Cup qualification

== Honours ==
Lech Poznań

- Ekstraklasa: 2014–15
- Polish Super Cup: 2015, 2016

Brøndby IF

- Danish Cup: 2017–18

HJK

- Veikkausliiga: 2022
