= Juho Rantala =

Finnish footballer and manager (born 1974)

Personal information
- Date of birth: 13 December 1974 (age 51)
- Place of birth: Helsinki, Finland
- Position: Defender

Team information
- Current team: Finland U19 (assistant coach)

Youth career
- 1981–1993: HJK

Senior career*
| Years | Team | Apps | (Gls) |
| 1994 | Vantaan Pallo-70 | 7 | (1) |
| 1994–1997 | Honka | 79 | (13) |
| 1998 | PK-35 | 0 | (0) |
| 1998 | → Gnistan (loan) | 19 | (2) |
| 1999 | Atlantis | 8 | (1) |
| 1999 | → KäPa (loan) | 7 | (2) |
| 2000–2001 | HIFK | 29 | (3) |
| 2000 | → RiPS (loan) | 4 | (0) |
| 2001–2003 | Billericay Town | 13 | (0) |
| 2003 | Barking & East Ham United | 1 | (0) |

Managerial career
- 2008–2009: Klubi 04
- 2010–2013: HJK (assistant)
- 2013–2014: Haka
- 2015–2016: Honka
- 2017–2018: HJK (sporting director)
- 2019–: Finland U19 (assistant)
- * Club domestic league appearances and goals as of 5 April 2024

Juho Rantala (born 13 December 1974 in Helsinki) is a football manager and former defender/midfielder. He is an assistant manager of the Finland national under-19 football team. He has also worked as a football pundit for Yle, MTV and C More Finland.
