= Tiquinho (footballer, born 1995) =

Brazilian footballer

Personal information
- Full name: Erikson Carlos Batista dos Santos
- Date of birth: 26 February 1995 (age 31)
- Place of birth: Belo Horizonte, Brazil
- Height: 1.69 m (5 ft 6 1/2 in)
- Position: Forward

Team information
- Current team: HIFK
- Number: 10

Youth career
- –2015: Corinthians Alagoano
- 2015: Betinense

Senior career*
Years	Team	Apps	(Gls)
2015–2016	Betinense		
2016	Athletic		
2016	Rio Branco-SP		
2016–2019	Rio Branco		
2018	→ Sagamihara (loan)	17	(2)
2019–2021	HIFK	38	(11)
2021	→ KTP (loan)	12	(0)
2022	Klubi 04	21	(7)
2023	HIFK	18	(4)
2024	PK-35	12	(0)
2024	→ HIFK (loan)	1	(0)
2025–	HIFK	35	(20)
- * Club domestic league appearances and goals as of 7 November 2026

Erikson Carlos Batista dos Santos (born 26 February 1995), known as Tiquinho, is a Brazilian footballer who plays for Finnish Kakkonen club HIFK.

== Career ==
=== Club ===
On 9 March 2019, Tiquinho signed for HIFK.

On 21 January 2022, he joined Klubi 04 for the 2022 season.

On 24 December 2022, Tiquinho agreed to return to HIFK for the 2023 season.
