= Oscar Häggström =

Finnish footballer (born 2004)

Personal information
- Date of birth: 24 April 2004 (age 22)
- Place of birth: Finland
- Height: 1.80 m (5 ft 11 in)
- Position: Right back

Team information
- Current team: TPS
- Number: 2

Youth career
- –2015: Toukolan Teräs
- 2015–2021: Käpylän Pallo

Senior career*
Years	Team	Apps	(Gls)
2021	Käpylän Pallo	3	(0)
2022	HJK	0	(0)
2022–2023	Klubi 04	29	(2)
2024–	TPS	63	(2)

International career^{‡}
2022	Finland U18	1	(0)
2022	Finland U19	2	(0)
2026–	Finland U21	2	(0)
- * Club domestic league appearances and goals as of 13 November 2026 ‡ National team caps and goals as of 23 August 2026

Oscar Häggström (born 24 April 2004) is a Finnish professional football player who plays as a right back for Veikkausliiga side Turun Palloseura.
