= Përparim Hetemaj =

Finnish footballer (born 1986)

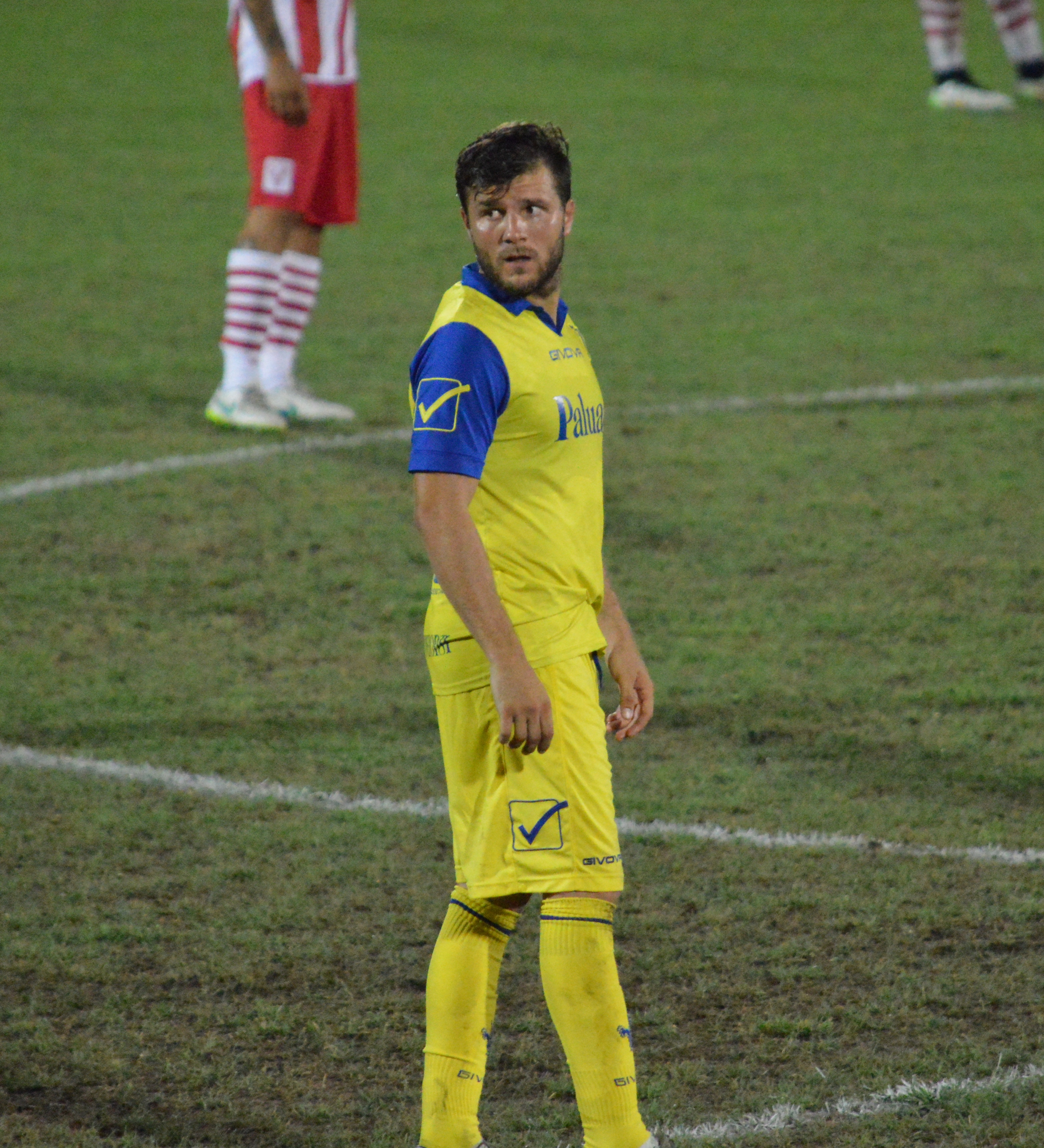
- Hetemaj with Chievo in 2015

Personal information
- Date of birth: 12 December 1986 (age 39)
- Place of birth: Skenderaj, SFR Yugoslavia
- Height: 1.75 m (5 ft 9 in)
- Position: Midfielder

Team information
- Current team: Klubi 04 (manager)

Youth career
- 1993–2003: HJK

Senior career*
Years	Team	Apps	(Gls)
2004	Klubi 04	21	(6)
2004–2006	HJK	33	(1)
2006–2009	AEK Athens	19	(0)
2008	→ Apollon Kalamarias (loan)	11	(1)
2009–2010	Twente	0	(0)
2010–2011	Brescia	34	(2)
2011–2019	Chievo	239	(6)
2019–2021	Benevento	64	(0)
2021–2022	Reggina	30	(1)
2022–2023	HJK	32	(2)
2024	Gilla FC	12	(18)

International career
2004–2005	Finland U-19	4	(2)
2005–2009	Finland U-21	16	(3)
2009–2017	Finland	49	(4)

Managerial career
- 2024–2025: Klubi 04 (assistant)
- 2025–: Klubi 04
Medal record
Representing Finland
Second place	Baltic Cup	2012
Third place	Baltic Cup	2014
- * Club domestic league appearances and goals

Përparim Hetemaj (born 12 December 1986) is a Finnish football coach and a former professional footballer who played as a midfielder. Born in Kosovo, Hetemaj arrived in Finland when he was six years old and played for HJK's youth teams; signing a professional contract in 2004 at age 17. He joined Greek side AEK Athens in 2006, and moved to Twente in 2009. Subsequently, in 2010, he was signed by Brescia and was transferred to Chievo in 2011. Hetemaj played a total of 300 matches in the Serie A, before returning to Finland in 2022 after a season with Reggina in the Serie B.

Hetemaj made his international debut for Finland in February 2009, at the age of 22, and made 50 appearances, including appearing in 2014 and 2018 FIFA World Cup qualifications, before his retirement from international football in 2018.

On 25 November 2023, it was announced by HJK, that Hetemaj will end his professional playing career after the season, and will start working as an assistant coach of their reserve team Klubi 04 in 2024. On 4 July 2025, HJK announced that Hetemaj had become the new head coach of Klubi 04, replacing Aleksi Lalli after Lalli moved to HJK's first-team coaching staff.

Hetemaj is regarded as a club legend of HJK Helsinki.

== Early and personal life ==
Of Kosovo Albanian ethnicity, Hetemaj was born in Skenderaj, Yugoslavia, and moved to Finland with his family as refugees in 1992. His family first arrived at Oulu but they moved to Helsinki due to his father Miftar suffering from asthma. He has a younger brother, the footballer Mehmet, and two sisters, Fatlume and Fatbardhe. In 2004, he acquired Finnish citizenship.

== Club career ==
=== HJK Helsinki ===
Hetemaj started his career at the youth academy of HJK Helsinki, and in 2004 played for its second team, Klubi-04, in 26 Ykkönen—the second tier of Finnish football—matches, in which he scored six goals. He played 26 matches and scored a goal in the 2005–06 season of Veikkausliiga—the premier division of Finnish football. After playing seven matches for HJK during the 2006–07, he was sold to AEK Athens for a fee of €450.000.

=== AEK Athens ===
Hetemaj made his AEK Athens debut on 26 September 2006 in a 1–1 draw against Anderlecht in the UEFA Champions League. After seven matches, Hetemaj's 2006–07 season ended on 8 February 2007, when he suffered a fractured leg after a tackle by Kevin Thomson during a friendly match between the Finnish and Scottish national teams.

He was again on playing condition in October 2007, but he did not play for AEK and in January 2008 he was loaned to Apollon Kalamarias until the end of the season to gain more playing experience. He scored his first goal in the Super League Greece on 23 February 2008 against Asteras Tripolis. He played a total of eight matches for Apollon Kalamarias in the 2007–08, and for the following season Hetemaj played nine league matches with AEK. Unsatisfied, Hetemaj asked to be transferred,

=== Twente ===
On 31 August 2009, Hetemaj signed a 1+1 year contract with Dutch club FC Twente as part of an exchange deal for Youssouf Hersi. Hetemaj started the season 2009–10 in the reserve team but was unable to break through to the first team that won the Eredivisie.

=== Brescia ===
Even before having played a match for Twente, On 1 February 2010, Hetemaj was signed by Italian club Brescia on a free transfer. Hetemaj only played four matches in 2009–10 Serie B; Brescia was promoted to Serie A and he signed a three-year contract. He made his Serie A debut on 12 September 2010, playing the full minutes in a 3–2 home victory over Palermo. He scored his first Serie A goal on 22 September 2010 against Roma, becoming the first Finnish footballer to score in Serie A and arousing Roma's interest in him. Hetemaj went on to score again in a 3–1 victory against Bologna.

=== Chievo ===
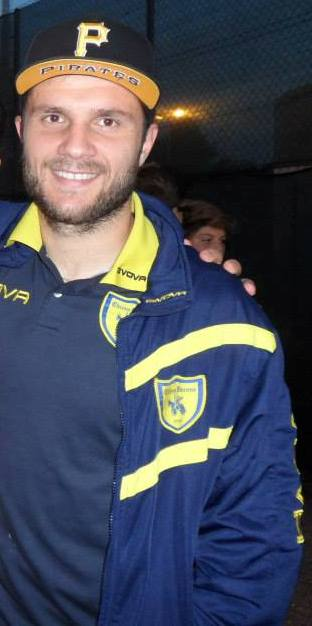
Hetemaj in 2015

On 30 June 2011, Hetemaj signed for Serie A side Chievo in a co-ownership deal for €1.4 million. As a result, he chose the number 56 shirt number at the club. He made his debut for Chievo on 11 September 2011 against Novara, when he provided an assist to Cyril Théréau score the second goal of Chievo in the drawn. At the end of the season and after 32 league matches, Chievo bought Hetemaj's full rights on 18 June 2012 for an additional €800,000. In the 2012–13 season and the 2013–2014, Hetemaj played 30 and 32 league matches respectively and did not score in any competition. Hetemaj marked his 100th appearance for Chievo on 22 August 2014 in a 1–0 defeat against Pescara in the Coppa Italia. After four years at Chievo and 130 Serie A matches, he scored his first goal for the club on 12 September 2015 in a 1–1 draw against Juventus. During his time with the club, Hetemaj recorded 249 appearances in all competitions combined.

=== Benevento ===
On 2 September 2019, Hetemaj signed a two-year contract with the Serie B club Benevento. At the end of his first season with the club coached by Filippo Inzaghi, Benevento won the Serie B title and were promoted to Serie A.

=== Reggina ===
On 28 July 2021, Hetemaj joined Serie B side Reggina on a one-year deal. He negotiated to terminate his contract on 21 April 2022 three games prior to the season ending, and returned to Finland to join his former club HJK Helsinki for the 2022 Veikkausliiga season.

=== Return to HJK ===
On 21 April 2022, Hetemaj returned to HJK and signed a two-year contract with an option for a third. During the 2022 season, Hetemaj played in 29 games in all competitions combined and recorded four goals, including both of HJK's goals in the UEFA Europa League group stage, against AS Roma and Ludogorets.

On 14 December 2023, Hetemaj scored a goal from penalty in his last official match as a professional footballer, in a 4–2 away loss against PAOK in the UEFA Conference League.

== International career ==
=== Youth ===
Hetemaj was first drafted to play for Finland U19 on 7 September 2004 for a match against Sweden in Vihti. He made four appearances in the U19 team and scored two goals. Hetemaj made his debut for the U21 side on 13 April 2005 against Estonia. Hetemaj, along with his brother Mehmet, was called up to represent Finland at the 2009 UEFA European Under-21 Football Championship and he played in all the three matches which Finland played.

=== Senior ===
Hetemaj made his senior debut for Finland as an 84th-minute substitute against Japan on 4 February 2009 in a 5–1 loss. He gained his first UEFA European Championship qualifying game on 3 June 2011 when Mixu Paatelainen chose him to the starting line up against San Marino. On 26 May 2012, he scored his first national goal—a last-minute goal—against Turkey in a friendly match, which assured a 3−2 victory for Finland.

Përparim Hetemaj was part of Finland squad in 2018 FIFA World Cup qualification. Thus, despite having a chance to switch to represent Kosovo, his Finland cap in the qualification effectively locked him to represent Finland only. However, Hetemaj refused to play against Kosovo. His brother Mehmet played once for Kosovo before the Football Federation of Kosovo became a member of UEFA and FIFA. However, he also lost the eligibility for Kosovo after played for Finland after Kosovo became a member.

On 8 January 2018, Hetemaj announced that he would retire from international duty.

== Coaching career ==
In the end of the 2023 season, Hetemaj announced his retirement from professional football as a player. He was appointed as an assistant coach of Klubi 04, the reserve team of HJK, starting in 2024.

== Outside football ==
=== Charity work ===
As of 2015, Hetemaj occasionally helps football club of his birthplace, Drenica, and he usually helps with different monetary means as well as technical means.

== Career statistics ==
=== Club ===
As of match played 14 December 2023

Appearances and goals by club, season and competition
Club	Season	League			National cup		Europe (Note: Includes appearances in the UEFA Champions League, UEFA Europa League/UEFA Cup, and UEFA Europa Conference League.)		Total	
Club	Season	Division	Apps	Goals	Apps	Goals	Apps	Goals	Apps	Goals
Klubi-04	2004	Ykkönen	21	6	—		—		21	6
HJK Helsinki	2005	Veikkausliiga	26	1	0	0	0	0	26	1
HJK Helsinki	2006	Veikkausliiga	7	0	0	0	0	0	7	0
HJK Helsinki	Total		33	1	0	0	0	0	33	1
AEK Athens	2006–07	Super League Greece	7	0	1	0	4	0	12	0
AEK Athens	2007–08	Super League Greece	0	0	1	0	0	0	1	0
AEK Athens	2008–09	Super League Greece	12	0	2	0	1	0	15	0
AEK Athens	Total		19	0	4	0	5	0	28	0
Apollon Kalamarias (loan)	2007–08	Super League Greece	11	1	—		—		11	1
Twente	2009–10	Eredivisie	0	0	1	0	—		1	0
Brescia	2009–10	Serie B	4	0	—		—		4	0
Brescia	2010–11	Serie A	30	2	1	0	—		31	2
Brescia	Total		34	2	1	0	—		35	2
Chievo	2011–12	Serie A	32	0	3	0	—		35	0
Chievo	2012–13	Serie A	30	0	0	0	—		30	0
Chievo	2013–14	Serie A	32	0	2	0	—		34	0
Chievo	2014–15	Serie A	32	0	1	0	—		33	0
Chievo	2015–16	Serie A	28	1	1	0	—		29	1
Chievo	2016–17	Serie A	23	0	1	0	—		24	0
Chievo	2017–18	Serie A	32	3	1	0	—		33	3
Chievo	2018–19	Serie A	30	2	1	0	—		31	2
Chievo	Total		239	6	10	0	—		249	6
Benevento	2019–20	Serie B	33	0	0	0	—		33	0
Benevento	2020–21	Serie A	31	0	1	0	—		32	0
Benevento	Total		64	0	1	0	—		65	0
Reggina	2021–22	Serie B	31	1	1	0	—		32	0
HJK Helsinki	2022	Veikkausliiga	16	2	1	0	12	2	29	4
HJK Helsinki	2023	Veikkausliiga	16	0	5	0	12	1	33	1
HJK Helsinki	Total		32	2	6	0	24	3	62	5
Career total			481	19	24	0	29	3	536	21

=== International ===
As of matches played on 9 October 2017

Appearances and goals by national team and year
National team	Year	Competitive		Friendly		Total	
National team	Year	Apps	Goals	Apps	Goals	Apps	Goals
Finland	2009	0	0	2	0	2	0
Finland	2010	0	0	0	0	0	0
Finland	2011	4	0	4	0	8	0
Finland	2012	2	0	6	3	8	3
Finland	2013	5	0	2	0	7	0
Finland	2014	4	0	5	1	9	1
Finland	2015	4	0	1	0	5	0
Finland	2016	1	0	5	0	6	0
Finland	2017	4	0	1	0	5	0
Total		24	0	26	4	50	4

Scores and results list Finland's goal tally first, score column indicates score after each Hetemaj goal.

List of international goals scored by Përparim Hetemaj
No.	Date	Venue	Opponent	Score	Result	Competition
1	26 May 2012	Red Bull Arena, Salzburg, Austria	Turkey	3–2	3−2	Friendly
2	15 August 2012	Windsor Park, Belfast, Northern Ireland	Northern Ireland	3–2	3−3	Friendly
3	14 November 2012	GSP Stadium, Nicosia, Cyprus	Cyprus	2−0	3−0	Friendly
4	31 May 2014	Ventspils Olimpiskais Stadions, Ventspils, Latvia	Estonia	1–0	2–0	2014 Baltic Cup

== Honours ==
HJK Helsinki

- Veikkausliiga: 2022, 2023
- Finnish Cup: 2006
- Finnish League Cup: 2023

Benevento

- Serie B: 2019–20

Finland

- Baltic Cup runner-up: 2012; third place: 2014
