= Jiri Nissinen =

Finnish footballer (born 1997)

Personal information
- Full name: Jiri Joona Oskari Nissinen
- Date of birth: 30 May 1997 (age 29)
- Place of birth: Sonkajärvi, Finland
- Height: 1.80 m (5 ft 11 in)
- Position: Defender

Team information
- Current team: IFK Mariehamn
- Number: 28

Senior career*
Years	Team	Apps	(Gls)
2013	PK-37	12	(0)
2014–2021	KuPS	43	(1)
2016–2020	→ KuFu-98 (loan)	45	(0)
2021	→ IFK Mariehamn (loan)	11	(0)
2021	→ VPS (loan)	9	(0)
2022–	IFK Mariehamn	102	(2)
- * Club domestic league appearances and goals as of 13 November 2026

Jiri Joona Oskari Nissinen (born 30 May 1997) is a Finnish professional footballer who plays for IFK Mariehamn, as a defender.

== Club career ==
For the 2022 season, he returned to IFK Mariehamn after playing there on loan in the previous season.
