= 2004 Ykkönen =

Finnish League Division 1
- Season: 2004

League tables for teams participating in Ykkönen, the second tier of the Finnish Soccer League system, in 2004.

== League table ==
Pos	Team	Pld	W	D	L	GF	GA	GD	Pts	Promotion or relegation
1	KuPS (C, P)	26	16	6	4	51	22	+29	54	Promotion to Veikkausliiga
2	IFK Mariehamn (P)	26	16	2	8	52	32	+20	50	Qualification to Promotion playoffs
3	FC Honka	26	13	4	9	55	38	+17	43	
4	FC Viikingit	26	11	9	6	40	33	+7	42	
5	AC Oulu	26	10	9	7	39	33	+6	39	
6	VPS	26	11	6	9	32	26	+6	39	
7	MP	26	9	11	6	46	40	+6	38	
8	Rakuunat	26	10	8	8	39	36	+3	38	
9	PP-70	26	9	8	9	36	30	+6	35	
10	P-Iirot	26	10	5	11	34	43	−9	35	
11	VG-62 (O)	26	9	6	11	34	40	−6	33	Qualification to Relegation playoffs
12	Närpes Kraft (R)	26	6	6	14	37	47	−10	24	Qualification to Relegation playoffs
13	FC Kuusankoski (R)	26	4	6	16	28	54	−26	18	Relegation to Kakkonen
14	GBK (Note: Jokerit Helsinki withdrew from the Veikkausliiga and the relegation of KooTeePee Kotka was cancelled. KooTeePee's fixtures in Ykkönen were inherited by GBK Kokkola, the highest placed relegated team in 2003.) (R)	26	3	4	19	26	75	−49	13	Relegation to Kakkonen

(C) Champions; (O) Play-off winners; (P) Promoted; (R) Relegated

=== Promotion play-offs ===
Jazz Pori as 13th placed team in the 2004 Veikkausliiga and MIFK Mariehamn as runners-up of the 2004 Ykkönen competed in a two-legged play-off for a place in the Veikkausliiga. MIFK won the play-offs 3–2 on aggregate and were promoted to the Veikkausliiga.

MIFK Mariehamn - Jazz Pori 1-0
Jazz Pori - MIFK Mariehamn 2-2

=== Relegation play-offs ===
OLS Oulu - VG-62 Naantali 0-1
VG-62 Naantali - OLS Oulu 3-1

KPV Kokkola - Kraft Närpes 1-1
Kraft Närpes - KPV Kokkola 1-1 aet., 1-4 pen.

KPV Kokkola (formerly also KPV-J Kokkola) were promoted to the Ykkönen and Kraft Närpes relegated to the Kakkonen. KPV Kokkola won 4–1 on penalties.
VG-62 Naantali remained in the Ykkönen after beating OLS Oulu 4–1 on aggregate.

== References and sources ==
- Rec.Sport.Soccer Statistics Foundation
- Ykkösen kausi 2004 (in Finnish)
