= Manuel Martic =

Austrian-Croatian footballer

Manuel Martić
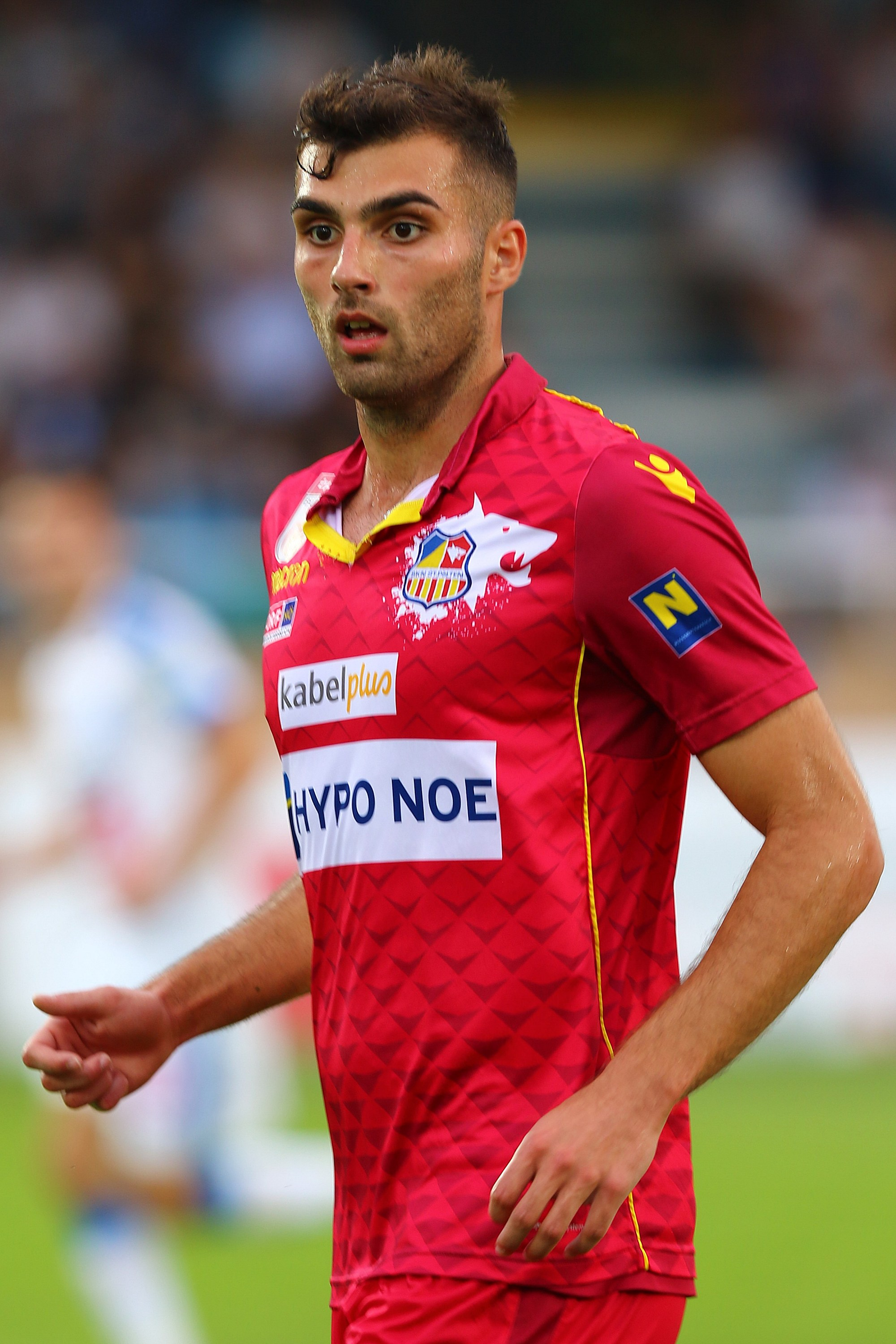
- Martić in 2018

Personal information
- Date of birth: 15 August 1995 (age 31)
- Place of birth: Steyr, Austria
- Height: 1.93 m (6 ft 4 in)
- Position: Midfielder

Team information
- Current team: Chievo

Youth career
- –2005: ASV Behamberg
- 2005–2011: Vorwärts Steyr

Senior career*
Years	Team	Apps	(Gls)
2011–2015	Vorwärts Steyr	38	(1)
2015–2018	St. Pölten	41	(3)
2018–2020	Rapid Wien	16	(0)
2020	Inter Zaprešić	4	(0)
2020–2021	Mezőkövesd	17	(0)
2022	HJK	10	(1)
2023–2025	Legnago	43	(8)
2025	Lecco	13	(0)
2025–2026	Catania	2	(0)
2026–	Chievo	0	(0)
- * Club domestic league appearances and goals as of 26 April 2026

Manuel Martić (born 15 August 1995) is an Austrian professional footballer who plays as a midfielder for Italian club Chievo.

== Club career ==
On 11 January 2022, Martić signed with HJK in Finland.

On 14 July 2023, Martić joined Legnago in the Italian third-tier Serie C on a two-season contract.

== Career statistics ==
As of 24 November 2024.

Appearances and goals by club, season and competition
Club	Season	League			National cup (Note: Includes Austrian Cup, Magyar Kupa and Suomen Cup)		Continental		Other		Total	
Club	Season	Division	Apps	Goals	Apps	Goals	Apps	Goals	Apps	Goals	Apps	Goals
Vorwärts Steyr	2011–12	Austrian Regionalliga Central	5	0	0	0	–		–		5	0
Vorwärts Steyr	2012–13	OÖ Liga	5	0	0	0	–		–		5	0
Vorwärts Steyr	2013–14	Austrian Regionalliga Central	12	0	0	0	–		–		12	0
Vorwärts Steyr	2014–15	Austrian Regionalliga Central	16	1	0	0	–		–		16	1
Vorwärts Steyr	Total		38	1	0	0	0	0	0	0	38	1
St. Pölten	2015–16	Austrian 2. Liga	2	0	1	0	–		–		3	0
St. Pölten	2016–17	Austrian Bundesliga	23	2	0	0	–		–		23	2
St. Pölten	2017–18	Austrian Bundesliga	16	1	1	0	–		–		17	1
St. Pölten	Total		41	3	2	0	0	0	0	0	43	3
St. Pölten II	2015–16	Austrian Regionalliga East	18	1	–		–		–		18	1
St. Pölten II	2016–17	Austrian Regionalliga East	7	2	–		–		–		7	2
St. Pölten II	2017–18	Austrian Regionalliga East	5	1	–		–		–		5	1
St. Pölten II	Total		30	4	0	0	0	0	0	0	30	4
Rapid Wien	2018–19	Austrian Bundesliga	15	0	2	0	5 (Note: Includes UEFA Europa League)	0	–		22	0
Rapid Wien	2019–20	Austrian Bundesliga	1	0	0	0	0	0	–		1	0
Rapid Wien	Total		16	0	2	0	5	0	0	0	23	0
Rapid Wien II	2018–19	Austrian Regionalliga East	1	0	–		–		–		1	0
Rapid Wien II	2019–20	Austrian Regionalliga East	3	1	–		–		–		3	1
Rapid Wien II	Total		4	1	0	0	0	0	0	0	4	1
Inter Zaprešić	2019–20	1. HNL	4	0	0	0	–		–		4	0
Mezőkövesd	2020–21	NB I	17	0	3	1	–		–		20	1
HJK	2022	Veikkausliiga	10	1	3	0	1 (Note: Includes UEFA Champions League and UEFA Europa League)	1	3 (Note: Includes Finnish League Cup)	0	17	2
Legnago	2023–24	Serie C	30	4	–		–		1 (Note: Includes Coppa Italia Serie C)	0	31	4
Legnago	2024–25	Serie C	10	4	–		–		–		10	4
Legnago	Total		40	8	0	0	0	0	1	0	41	8
Career total			200	18	10	1	6	1	4	0	220	20

== Honours ==
St. Pölten

- Austrian 2. Liga: 2015–16

Rapid Wien

- Austrian Cup runner-up: 2018–19

HJK Helsinki

- Veikkausliiga: 2022
