= 2005 Kakkonen – Finnish League Division 2 =

Finnish League Division 2
- Season: 2005
- Champions: Klubi-04; JIPPO; SalPa; VIFK
- Promoted: Klubi-04; JIPPO; VIFK
- Relegated: 8 teams

League tables for teams participating in Kakkonen, the third tier of the Finnish Soccer League system, in 2005. Kakkonen was reduced to 3 groups of 14 teams for season 2006.

== League tables ==
=== Southern Group, Etelälohko ===
Pos	Team	Pld	W	D	L	GF	GA	GD	Pts	Qualification or relegation
1	Klubi-04, Helsinki	20	14	5	1	59	16	+43	47	Promotion Playoff
2	Gnistan, Helsinki	20	13	2	5	48	22	+26	41	
3	FC Espoo	20	11	5	4	44	25	+19	38	
4	KäPa, Helsinki	20	10	5	5	44	36	+8	35	
5	FC Kontu, Helsinki	20	10	4	6	31	27	+4	34	
6	LPS, Helsinki	20	7	4	9	44	46	−2	25	
7	EIF, Tammisaari	20	5	5	10	43	51	−8	20	
8	GrIFK, Kauniainen	20	5	3	12	26	45	−19	18	
9	HyPS, Hyvinkää	20	5	3	12	32	55	−23	18	
10	Ponnistus, Helsinki	20	5	3	12	27	53	−26	18	Relegation Playoff
11	FCK Salamat, Kirkkonummi	20	2	7	11	30	52	−22	13	Relegated

NB: FJK, Forssa withdrew on May 24, their 3 matches were annulled.

NB: JJK II, promoted from Division Three, withdrew and Ponnistus took their place.

=== Eastern Group, Itälohko ===
Pos	Team	Pld	W	D	L	GF	GA	GD	Pts	Qualification or relegation
1	JIPPO, Joensuu	22	14	5	3	44	19	+25	47	Promotion Playoff
2	TPV, Tampere	22	10	6	6	28	26	+2	36	
3	FC Kuusankoski	22	9	8	5	31	28	+3	35	
4	KuPS Akatemia, Kuopio	22	9	6	7	33	26	+7	33	
5	Kings, Kuopio	22	9	6	7	31	24	+7	33	
6	Warkaus JK	22	9	5	8	33	29	+4	32	
7	JJK Jyväskylä	22	9	5	8	29	28	+1	32	
8	Huima, Äänekoski	22	8	7	7	29	24	+5	31	
9	TKT, Tampere	22	7	4	11	24	32	−8	25	
10	FC Vaajakoski	22	7	2	13	32	46	−14	23	Relegation Playoff
11	Kajo, Valkeala	22	6	3	13	24	41	−17	21	Relegated
12	MiKi, Mikkeli	22	4	5	13	19	34	−15	17	Relegated

NB: Jyväskylä United withdrew, FC Vaajakoski took their place.

=== Western Group, Länsilohko ===
Pos	Team	Pld	W	D	L	GF	GA	GD	Pts	Qualification or relegation
1	SalPa, Salo	22	15	3	4	49	22	+27	48	Promotion Playoff
2	PoPa, Pori	22	11	5	6	38	21	+17	38	
3	PIF, Parainen	22	11	3	8	41	31	+10	36	
4	Masku	22	10	5	7	34	28	+6	35	
5	KaaPo, Kaarina	22	11	2	9	33	28	+5	35	
6	TP-Seinäjoki	22	9	7	6	39	26	+13	34	
7	Närpes Kraft, Närpiö	22	9	7	6	37	26	+11	34	
8	Sepsi-78, Seinäjoki	22	9	6	7	30	29	+1	33	
9	SoVo, Somero	22	9	3	10	32	38	−6	30	
10	Virkiä, Lapua	22	4	6	12	22	39	−17	18	Relegation Playoff
11	Kaskö IK, Kaskinen	22	4	3	15	22	55	−33	15	Relegated
12	MuSa, Pori	22	4	2	16	19	53	−34	14	Relegated

=== Northern Group, Pohjoislohko ===
Pos	Team	Pld	W	D	L	GF	GA	GD	Pts	Qualification or relegation
1	VIFK, Vaasa	20	13	5	2	55	15	+40	44	Promotion Playoff
2	FC Kiisto, Vaasa	20	12	3	5	34	28	+6	39	
3	PS Kemi	20	11	5	4	42	26	+16	38	
4	TUS, Teerijärvi	20	10	6	4	39	31	+8	36	
5	GBK, Kokkola	20	9	8	3	38	16	+22	35	
6	JBK, Pietarsaari	20	7	4	9	40	39	+1	25	
7	FC YPA, Ylivieska	20	5	5	10	32	45	−13	20	
8	FC Korsholm, Mustasaari	20	5	3	12	27	38	−11	18	
9	FC Dreeverit, Oulu	20	3	9	8	21	34	−13	18	
10	Tervarit, Oulu	20	3	5	12	17	39	−22	14	Relegation Playoff
11	KajHa, Kajaani	20	3	5	12	12	46	−34	14	Relegated

NB: Because OLS were promoted to Division One, Division Two North was played with 11 teams.

=== Promotion Playoff ===
First Legs

Klubi-04 1-0 JIPPO
SalPa 1-2 VIFK

Second Legs

JIPPO 2-0 Klubi-04
VIFK 1-1 SalPa

JIPPO and VIFK promoted, Klubi-04 and SalPa to division one/division two playoff.

=== Division One/Division Two Playoff ===
First Legs

SalPa 0-4 Hämeenlinna
Klubi-04 2-1 VG-62

Second Legs

Hämeenlinna 3-1 SalPa
VG-62 3-2 Klubi-04

Klubi-04 promoted, VG-62 relegated. Hämeenlinna remain at second level.

=== Relegation playoff ===
First Legs

Ponnistus 0-2 FCV
Tervarit 0-2 Virkiä

Second Legs

FCV 1-1 Ponnistus
Virkiä 4-3 Tervarit

Ponnistus and Tervarit relegated, FCV and Virkiä remain at third level.

== References and sources ==
- Finnish FA, Suomen Palloliitto
