= Klubi 04 =

Finnish football club

- Full name: Talenttiklubi Klubi 04
- Founded: 2004
- Ground: Töölö Football Stadium, Helsinki
- Capacity: 10,770
- Manager: Aleksi Lalli
- League: Ykkösliiga
- 2026: Ykkösliiga, 8th of 10
- Website: www.hjk.fi
| Home colours | Away colours | Third colours |

Klubi 04 is a Finnish football club based in Helsinki. It is the reserve team of HJK Helsinki for whom a number of the players are also registered.

== History ==
Klubi 04 was founded in 2004 when HJK bought FC Jokerit. Initially Klubi 04 played in Kakkonen, the third highest league level in Finland. Klubi 04 was promoted to Ykkönen in 2006 when it beat FC Inter's reserve team VG-62. Klubi's former head coach is Abdou Talat, he finished with Klubi 04 the sixth place in 2006 its first season in Ykkönen.

Season 2007 Klubi 04:n finished in Ykkönen 14th. The team was relegated to Kakkonen for Season 2008. For season 2008 the team was altered for the most parts, and the new head coach was Juho Rantala. The young team was promoted back to Ykkönen by securing the place two rounds before season end. During Season 2009 the team secured its place in Ykkönen three rounds before season end, and they finished at 8th place.

For Season 2010 Klubi 04 received new head coach with Pasi Rasimus.

== Seasons ==
- 7 season in Ykkösliiga/Ykkönen (Tier 2)
- 15 seasons in Ykkönen/Kakkonen (Tier 3)

| Season | Level | Division | Section | Administration | Position | Movements |
|---|---|---|---|---|---|---|
| 2004 | Tier 3 | Kakkonen (Second Division) | Southern Group | Finnish FA (Suomen Palloliitto) | 3rd | |
| 2005 | Tier 3 | Kakkonen (Second Division) | Southern Group | Finnish FA (Suomen Palloliitto) | 1st (Champions) | Promotion Playoff - Promoted |
| 2006 | Tier 2 | Ykkönen (First Division) | | Finnish FA (Suomen Palloliitto) | 6th | |
| 2007 | Tier 2 | Ykkönen (First Division) | | Finnish FA (Suomen Palloliitto) | 14th | Relegated |
| 2008 | Tier 3 | Kakkonen (Second Division) | Group A | Finnish FA (Suomen Palloliitto) | 1st | Promoted |
| 2009 | Tier 2 | Ykkönen (First Division) | | Finnish FA (Suomen Palloliitto) | 8th | |
| 2010 | Tier 2 | Ykkönen (First Division) | | Finnish FA (Suomen Palloliitto) | 13th | Relegated |
| 2011 | Tier 3 | Kakkonen (Second Division) | Group A | Finnish FA (Suomen Palloliitto) | 1st | Promotion Playoff |
| 2012 | Tier 3 | Kakkonen (Second Division) | Southern Group | Finnish FA (Suomen Palloliitto) | 5th | |
| 2013 | Tier 3 | Kakkonen (Second Division) | Southern Group | Finnish FA (Suomen Palloliitto) | 5th | |
| 2014 | Tier 3 | Kakkonen (Second Division) | Southern Group | Finnish FA (Suomen Palloliitto) | 5th | |
| 2015 | Tier 3 | Kakkonen (Second Division) | Eastern Group | Finnish FA (Suomen Palloliitto) | 1st | Promotion Playoff |
| 2016 | Tier 3 | Kakkonen (Second Division) | Group B | Finnish FA (Suomen Palloliitto) | 5th | |
| 2017 | Tier 3 | Kakkonen (Second Division) | Group A | Finnish FA (Suomen Palloliitto) | 2nd | Promotion Playoff - Promoted |
| 2018 | Tier 2 | Ykkönen (First Division) | | Finnish FA (Suomen Palloliitto) | 10th | Relegated |
| 2019 | Tier 3 | Kakkonen (Second Division) | Group A | Finnish FA (Suomen Palloliitto) | 5th | |
| 2020 | Tier 3 | Kakkonen (Second Division) | Group B | Finnish FA (Suomen Palloliitto) | 1st | Promoted |
| 2021 | Tier 2 | Ykkönen (First Division) | | Finnish FA (Suomen Palloliitto) | 10th | Relegated |
| 2022 | Tier 3 | Kakkonen (Second Division) | Group B | Finnish FA (Suomen Palloliitto) | 4th | |
| 2023 | Tier 3 | Kakkonen (Second Division) | Group A | Finnish FA (Suomen Palloliitto) | 3rd | Promotion Playoff Promoted to Ykkönen |
| 2024 | Tier 3 | Ykkönen (First Division) | | Finnish FA (Suomen Palloliitto) | 1st | Promoted |
| 2025 | Tier 2 | Ykkösliiga (League One) | | Finnish FA (Suomen Palloliitto) | | |

== Current squad ==
As of 27 July 2026

Note: Flags indicate national team as defined under FIFA eligibility rules; some limited exceptions apply. Players may hold more than one non-FIFA nationality.

| No. | Pos. | Nation | Player |
|---|---|---|---|
| 45 | DF | FIN | Ruben Barrett |
| 46 | DF | FIN | Iivo Nybäck |
| 47 | DF | FIN | Emil Leveälahti |
| 48 | MF | FIN | Ahti Haikala |
| 49 | FW | FIN | Niilo Siren |
| 51 | MF | FIN | Niko Peltola |
| 52 | FW | NGR | Qurib Adetola |
| 53 | DF | FIN | Jere Kari |
| 54 | MF | FIN | Adam Zaitra |
| 59 | DF | FIN | Eetu Grönlund |
| 61 | FW | FIN | Valo Konttas |
| 62 | MF | FIN | Leevi Palmula |
| 63 | DF | FIN | Adam Le Goff-Conan |
| 64 | MF | FIN | Peetu Hardén |
| 65 | DF | FIN | Dion Zaberxha |

| No. | Pos. | Nation | Player |
|---|---|---|---|
| 68 | MF | FIN | Antton Nylund |
| 71 | FW | FIN | Jay De Nascimento |
| 72 | FW | KOS | Art Berisha |
| 74 | MF | EST | Robert Mihhalevski |
| 75 | DF | FIN | Janne Hietalahti |
| 77 | FW | AUS | Liam Rippon |
| 78 | GK | FIN | Jesse Kiljunen |
| 79 | GK | FIN | Jussi Tanska |
| 87 | FW | FIN | Nicklas Kroupkin |
| 89 | GK | FIN | Mitja Haapanen |
| 92 | DF | FIN | Mustafa Ameen |
| 94 | FW | FIN | Samuel Salo |
| 95 | FW | NGR | David Olorunfemi |
| 96 | MF | FIN | Ilmo Toivonen |

== Management ==
As of 24 April 2025

| Name | Role |
|---|---|
| (Finland) Aleksi Lalli | Head coach |
| (Finland) Perparim Hetemaj | Coach |
| (Finland) Ville Vastamäki | Goalkeeping coach |
| (Finland) Timi Pettersson | Performance Coach |
| (Finland) Petteri Jutila | Kitman, Team manager |
| (Finland) Raine Kuusisto | Kitman, Team manager |
| (Finland) Elias Louhento | Kitman |
| (Finland) Risto-Matti Toivonen | Head of Sports Science |
| (Finland) Toni Taipale | Physiotherapist |
| (Finland) Klaus Köhler | Team Doctor |

== Former coaches ==
- Abdou Talat
- Juho Rantala
- Toni Koskela
- Miika Nuutinen
- Joonas Rantanen
- Mika Väyrynen

== See also ==
- Category:Klubi 04 players
