= 2014–15 in Polish football =

Football in Poland
- Season: 2014–15

2014–15 in Polish football
- Ekstraklasa champions
- Lech Poznań
- Polish Cup winner
- Legia Warsaw
- Polish Super Cup winner
- Zawisza Bydgoszcz
- Teams in Europe
- Legia Warsaw, Lech Poznań, Ruch Chorzów, Zawisza Bydgoszcz
- Poland national team
- UEFA Euro 2016 qualifying

The 2014–15 season was the 90th season of competitive football in Poland. The domestic season began on 9 July 2014, with the start of the Polish Super Cup.

== Polish Cup ==
2 May 2015 Final	Legia Warsaw	2 - 1	Lech Poznań	National Stadium, Warsaw
16:00 CEST (UTC+2)	Duda (yellow card) 12'; Jodłowiec 30'; Saganowski 55'; Kucharczyk (yellow card) 64'	Report	Jodłowiec 20' (o.g.); Trałka (yellow card) 44'; Douglas (yellow card) 51', 88', (red card) 88'	Attendance: 45,322; Referee: Daniel Stefański (Bydgoszcz)

== Polish Super Cup ==
9 July 2014	Legia Warsaw	2 - 3	Zawisza Bydgoszcz	Pepsi Arena, Warsaw
19:00 CEST (UTC+2)	Vrdoljak (yellow card) 28'; Ryczkowski 43'; Piech (yellow card) 62'; Saganowski 62'	Report	Petasz (yellow card) 6'; Luís Carlos 30'; Alvarinho 54'; Drygas (yellow card) 63'; Vasconcelos (yellow card) 82'; Gevorgyan 90'	Attendance: 12,000; Referee: Bartosz Frankowski

== Polish clubs in Europe ==
=== Legia Warsaw ===
2014–15 UEFA Champions League

16 July 2014 Second qualifying round	Legia Warsaw (Poland)	1 - 1	(Republic of Ireland) St Patrick Athletic FC	Pepsi Arena, Warsaw
20:45 CEST (UTC+2)	Duda (yellow card) 90'; Radović 90+1'	Report	Fagan 38'; Clarke (yellow card) 45+1'; Oman (yellow card) 47'	Attendance: 10,000; Referee: Ionuț Avram (Romania)

23 July 2014 Second qualifying round	St Patrick's Athletic FC (Republic of Ireland)	0 - 5 (1 - 6 agg.)	(Poland) Legia Warsaw	Tallaght Stadium, Tallaght
20:45 CEST (UTC+2)	Bolger (yellow card) 46'	Report	Duda (yellow card) 17'; Radović 25', 82'; Żyro 69'; Saganowski 87'; Byrne 90+2' (o.g.)	Attendance: 5,500; Referee: Andreas Ekberg, Sweden

30 July 2014 Third qualifying round	Legia Warsaw (Poland)	4 - 1	(Scotland) Celtic FC	Pepsi Arena, Warsaw
20:45 CEST (UTC+2)	Radović 10', 36'; Astiz (yellow card) 22'; Vrdoljak (penalty missed) 59', 87'; Żyro 84'; Kosecki (yellow card) 89' (goal) 90+1'	Report	McGregor 8'; Ambrose (red card) 44'; Mulgrew (yellow card) 87'; Kayal (yellow card) 88'; Griffiths (yellow card) 89'	Attendance: 22,265; Referee: Pol van Boekel (Netherlands)

6 August 2014 Third qualifying round	Celtic FC (Scotland)	0 - 2 (3 - 0 wo.) (4 - 4 agg.)	(Poland) Legia Warsaw	Murrayfield Stadium, Edinburgh
20:45 CEST (UTC+2)	Van Dijk (yellow card) 53'; Johansen (yellow card) 65'	Report	Żyro 36'; Radović (yellow card) 55'; Kucharczyk 61'	Attendance: 35,000; Referee: Paolo Mazzoleni (Italy)
Note: Legia Warsaw completed a second win over Celtic FC, but were then sanctioned for fielding a suspended player and thus forfeited the match 3-0.

2014–15 UEFA Europa League

21 August 2014 Play-off round	FC Aktobe (Kazakhstan)	0 - 1	(Poland) Legia Warsaw	Aktobe Central Stadium, Aktobe
17:00 CEST (UTC+2)	Korobkin (yellow card) 72'	Report	Duda 48'	Attendance: 12,500; Referee: Sergei Karasev (Russia)

28 August 2014 Play-off round	Legia Warsaw (Poland)	2 - 0 (3 - 0 agg.)	(Kazakhstan) FC Aktobe	Pepsi Arena, Warsaw
21:00 CEST (UTC+2)	Kucharczyk 26'; Vrdoljak (yellow card) 29', (goal) 66' (pen.); Kosecki (yellow card) 69'; Kuciak (yellow card) 85'	Report	Korobkin (yellow card) 22'; Logvinenko (yellow card) 65'	Attendance: 18,549; Referee: Mattias Gestranius (Finland)

18 September 2014 Group Stage	Legia Warsaw (Poland)	1 - 0	(Belgium) KSC Lokeren	Pepsi Arena, Warsaw
21:05 CEST (UTC+2)	Radović 58'; Broź (yellow card) 64'; Rzeźniczak (yellow card) 77'; Żyro (yellow card) 85'	Report	Scholz (yellow card) 56'; Vanaken (yellow card) 79'	Attendance: 22,000; Referee: Michael Oliver (England)

2 October 2014 Group Stage	Trabzonspor (Turkey)	0 - 1	(Poland) Legia Warsaw	Hüseyin Avni Aker Stadium, Trabzon
19:00 CEST (UTC+2)	Constant (yellow card) 45'; Papadopoulos (yellow card) 74'; Yılmaz (yellow card) 90+5'	Report	Kucharczyk 16', (yellow card) 43'; Żyro (yellow card) 25' (yellow-red card) 88'; Brzyski (yellow card) 35'; D. Júnior (yellow card) 49'; Duda (yellow card) 80'	Attendance: 9,875; Referee: Viktor Kassai (Hungary)

22 October 2014 Group Stage	Metalist Kharkiv (Ukraine)	0 - 1	(Poland) Legia Warsaw	Valeriy Lobanovskyi Dynamo Stadium, Kyiv
18:00 CEST (UTC+2)	Chaco Torres (yellow card) 36'; Bolbat (yellow card) 36'; Pshenychnykh (yellow card) 59'; Jajá (penalty missed) 69'; Edmar (yellow card) 82'	Report	Duda 28', (yellow card) 84'; Vrdoljak (penalty missed) 52'	Attendance: 2,374; Referee: Gediminas Mažeika (Lithuania)

6 November 2014 Group Stage	Legia Warsaw (Poland)	2 - 1	(Ukraine) Metalist Kharkiv	Pepsi Arena, Warsaw
21:05 CEST (UTC+2)	Saganowski 29'; Kucharczyk (yellow card) 45+1'; Duda 84'; Sá (yellow card) 86'; Rzeźniczak (yellow card) 90+1'	Report	Villagra (yellow card) 14'; Kobin 22'; Chaco Torres (yellow card) 62'; Kulakov (yellow card) 63'; Edmar (yellow card) 86'	Attendance: 25,809; Referee: Eitan Shemeulevitch (Israel)

27 November 2014 Group Stage	KSC Lokeren (Belgium)	1 - 0	(Poland) Legia Warsaw	Daknamstadion, Lokeren
19:00 CEST (UTC+2)	Vanaken 7'; Patosi (yellow card) 84'	Report	Guilherme (yellow card) 36'; Rzeźniczak (yellow card) 52'; Jodłowiec (yellow card) 82'	Attendance: 6,526; Referee: Michael Koukoulakis (Greece)

11 December 2014 Group Stage	Legia Warsaw (Poland)	2 - 0	(Turkey) Trabzonspor	Pepsi Arena, Warsaw
21:05 CEST (UTC+2)	Öztürk 22' (o.g.); Sá 56'	Report	Dursun (yellow card) 13'; Demir (yellow card) 49'; Yilmaz (yellow card) 54'; Constant (yellow card) 58'; Ekici (yellow card) 74' (yellow-red card) 90+1'	Attendance: 0 Referee: Kenn Hansen (Denmark)

19 February 2015 Round of 32	AFC Ajax (Netherlands)	1 - 0	(Poland) Legia Warsaw	Amsterdam ArenA, Amsterdam
21:05 CEST (UTC+2)	Milik 35'; Bazoer (yellow card) 45'	Report	Jodłowiec (yellow card) 36'; Vrdoljak (yellow card) 90+1'	Attendance: 46,761; Referee: Jonas Eriksson (Sweden)

26 February 2015 Round of 32	Legia Warsaw (Poland)	0 - 3	(Netherlands) AFC Ajax	Pepsi Arena, Warsaw
19:00 CEST (UTC+2)	Vrdoljak (yellow card) 18'; Guilherme (yellow card) 21'; Sá (yellow card) 24'; Żyro (yellow card) 39'; Rzeźniczak (yellow card) 63'	Report	Milik 11', 43'; Viergever 13'	Attendance: 0 Referee: David Fernández (Spain)

=== Lech Poznań ===
2014–15 UEFA Europa League

17 July 2014 Second qualifying round	JK Nõmme Kalju (Estonia)	1 - 0	(Poland) Lech Poznań	Kadrioru staadion, Tallinn
18:00 CEST (UTC+2)	Pürg (yellow card) 36'; Vunk (yellow card) 47'; Wakui 81'	Report	Trałka (yellow card) 14'; Pawłowski (yellow card) 78'	Attendance: 2,280; Referee: Domagoj Vučkov (Croatia)

24 July 2014 Second qualifying round	Lech Poznań (Poland)	3 - 0 (3 - 1 agg.)	(Estonia) JK Nõmme Kalju	INEA Stadion, Poznań
19:00 CEST (UTC+2)	Jevtić (yellow card) 27'; Kędziora 33'; Hämäläinen 43'; Kownacki 90+3'	Report		Attendance: 20,263; Referee: Sebastian Colţescu (Romania)

31 July 2014 Third qualifying round	Stjarnan FC (Iceland)	1 - 0	(Poland) Lech Poznań	Stjörnuvöllur, Garðabær
20:30 CEST (UTC+2)	Toft 48'; Punyed (yellow card) 86'	Report		Attendance: 1,000; Referee: Ognjen Valjić (Bosnia and Herzegovina)

7 August 2014 Third qualifying round	Lech Poznań (Poland)	0 - 0 (0 - 1 agg.)	(Iceland) Stjarnan FC	INEA Stadion, Poznań
19:00 CEST (UTC+2)	Henríquez (yellow card) 70'; Kownacki (yellow card) 90+2'; Ubiparip (yellow card) 90+2'; Jevtić (yellow card) 90+4'	Report	Rauschenberg (yellow card) 80'	Attendance: 22,629; Referee: Pavle Radovanović (Montenegro)

=== Ruch Chorzów ===
2014–15 UEFA Europa League

17 July 2014 Second qualifying round	Ruch Chorzów (Poland)	3 - 2	(Liechtenstein) FC Vaduz	Stadion Piasta, Gliwice
18:00 CEST (UTC+2)	Malinowski (yellow card) 6'; Zieńczuk 19'; Stawarczyk 21', 74' (yellow card) 53'; Kowalski (yellow card) 86'	Report	Muntwiler 16'; Ciccone (yellow card) 27'; Surma 60' (o.g.); Untersee (yellow card) 84'	Attendance: 1,000; Referee: Radek Příhoda (Czech Republic)

24 July 2014 Second qualifying round	FC Vaduz (Liechtenstein)	0 - 0 (2 - 3 agg.)	(Poland) Ruch Chorzów	Rheinpark Stadion, Vaduz
19:00 CEST (UTC+2)	Stahel (yellow card) 17'; Muntwiler (yellow card) 23' (yellow-red card) 75'; Kryeziu (yellow card) 38'	Report	Stawarczyk (yellow card) 17'; Starzyński (yellow card) 47'; Kamiński (yellow card) 74'; Babiarz (yellow card) 90'	Attendance: 2,036; Referee: Anar Salmanov (Azerbaijan)

31 July 2014 Third qualifying round	Ruch Chorzów (Poland)	0 - 0	(Denmark) Esbjerg fB	Stadion Piasta, Gliwice
18:00 CEST (UTC+2)		Report	Gomes (yellow card) 83'	Attendance: 4,000; Referee: Vlado Glodjović (Serbia)

7 August 2014 Third qualifying round	Esbjerg fB (Denmark)	2 - 2 (2 - 2 agg.)	(Poland) Ruch Chorzów	Blue Water Arena, Esbjerg
18:00 CEST (UTC+2)	Jakobsen (yellow card) 13'; Nielsen 29'; Lekven (yellow card) 45'; Laursen (yellow card) 84'; Pušić 85', (yellow card) 86'	Report	Starzyński 13' (pen.); Malinowski (yellow card) 18'; Dziwniel (yellow card) 81'; Surma 90+5'	Attendance: 7,008; Referee: Kristo Tohver (Estonia)

21 August 2014 Play-off round	Ruch Chorzów (Poland)	0 - 0	(Ukraine) Metalist Kharkiv	Stadion Piasta, Gliwice
18:00 CEST (UTC+2)	Zieńczuk (yellow card) 22'; Babiarz (yellow card) 90+3'	Report		Attendance: 6,114; Referee: Alon Yefet (Israel)

28 August 2014 Play-off round	Metalist Kharkiv (Ukraine)	1 - 0 (a.e.t.) (1 - 0 agg.)	(Poland) Ruch Chorzów	Olympic Stadium, Kyiv
18:00 CEST (UTC+2)	Edmar (yellow card) 52'; Cleiton Xavier 105' (pen.); Krasnopyorov (yellow card) 106'	Report	Starzyński (yellow card) 38'; Kamiński (red card) 103'	Attendance: 2,548; Referee: Tony Chapron (France)

=== Zawisza Bydgoszcz ===
2014–15 UEFA Europa League

17 July 2014 Second qualifying round	SV Zulte Waregem (Belgium)	2 - 1	(Poland) Zawisza Bydgoszcz	Regenboogstadion, Waregem
20:00 CEST (UTC+2)	Colpaert 8'; N'Diaye (yellow card) 43'; Plet 45'; Skúlason (yellow card) 50'; Cacérès (yellow card) 88'	Report	Drygas 15'; Joshua Silva (yellow card) 39'; Wójcicki (yellow card) 52'; Petasz (yellow card) 70'	Attendance: 5,843; Referee: Alejandro José Hernández Hernández (Spain)

24 July 2014 Second qualifying round	Zawisza Bydgoszcz (Poland)	1 - 3 (2 - 5 agg.)	(Belgium) SV Zulte Waregem	Stadion im. Zdzisława Krzyszkowiaka, Bydgoszcz
20:00 CEST (UTC+2)	Araújo (yellow card) 37'; Wágner (yellow card) 45'; Petasz 52'; Ziajka (yellow card) 57'; Strąk (yellow card) 61'; Vasconcelos (red card) 68'	Report	Plet 1'; Aneke 48'; N'Diaye (yellow card) 51'; Skúlason 76'	Referee: Lee Probert (England)

== National teams ==
=== Poland national team ===
7 September 2014 UEFA Euro 2016 qualifying	Gibraltar	0 - 7	Poland	Estádio Algarve, Faro
20:45 CEST (UTC+2)	Artell (yellow card) 68'	Report	Grosicki 11', 48'; Klich (yellow card) 17'; Glik (yellow card) 41'; R. Lewandowski 50', 53', 86', 90+2'; Szukała 58'	Attendance: 1,620; Referee: Stefan Johannesson (Sweden)

11 October 2014 UEFA Euro 2016 qualifying	Poland	2 - 0	Germany	National Stadium, Warsaw
20:45 CEST (UTC+2)	Szukała (yellow card) 20'; Milik 51'; R. Lewandowski (yellow card) 56'; Mila 88'; Piszczek (yellow card) 90+3'	Report	J. Boateng (yellow card) 25'; Bellarabi (yellow card) 86'	Attendance: 56,934; Referee: Pedro Proença (Portugal)

14 October 2014 UEFA Euro 2016 qualifying	Poland	2 - 2	Scotland	National Stadium, Warsaw
20:45 CEST (UTC+2)	Mączyński 11'; Krychowiak (yellow card) 60'; Milik 76'	Report	Maloney 18'; Naismith 57'; Greer (yellow card) 85'	Attendance: 55,197; Referee: Alberto Undiano Mallenco (Spain)

14 November 2014 UEFA Euro 2016 qualifying	Georgia	0 - 4	Poland	National Stadium, Tbilisi
18:00 CET (UTC+1)	Kankava (yellow card) 52'; Lobjanidze (yellow card) 56'	Report	Glik 51', (yellow card) 79'; Krychowiak 71'; Mila 73'; Jodłowiec (yellow card) 83'; Linetty (yellow card) 90+1'; Milik 90+2'	Attendance: 25,000; Referee: Paolo Tagliavento (Italy)

18 November 2014 Friendly	Poland	2 - 2	Switzerland	Stadion Miejski, Wrocław
20:45 CET (UTC+1)	Jodłowiec (yellow card) 37'; Jędrzejczyk 45'; Milik 61'; Żyro (yellow card) 65' (yellow-red card) 83'; Mila (yellow card) 67'; Broź (yellow card) 71'	Report	Drmić 5'; Bürki (yellow card) 60'; Schönbächler (yellow card) 82'; Frei 88'	Attendance: 40,133; Referee: Kristinn Jakobsson (Iceland)

29 March 2015 UEFA Euro 2016 qualifying	Republic of Ireland	1 - 1	Poland	Aviva Stadium, Dublin
20:45 CEST (UTC+2)	Hoolahan (yellow card) 25'; O'Shea (yellow card) 32'; Coleman (yellow card) 44'; Wilson (yellow card) 71'; McCarthy (yellow card) 86'; Long 90+1'	Report	Peszko 26', (yellow card) 86'; Glik (yellow card) 50'; Szukała (yellow card) 60'	Attendance: 50,500; Referee: Jonas Eriksson (Sweden)

13 June 2015 UEFA Euro 2016 qualifying	Poland	4 - 0	Georgia	National Stadium, Warsaw
18:00 CEST (UTC+2)	Milik 62'; R. Lewandowski 89', 90+2', 90+3'	Report		Attendance: 56,512; Referee: Aleksei Kulbakov (Belarus)

16 June 2015 Friendly	Poland	0 - 0	Greece	PGE Arena, Gdańsk
20:45 CEST (UTC+2)		Report	Stafylidis (yellow card) 89'	Attendance: 37,192; Referee: Alain Bieri (Switzerland)

=== Poland U-21 national team ===
9 September 2014 UEFA Euro U-21 Champ. qual.	Greece	3 - 1	Poland	Municipal Stadium of Katerini, Katerini
18:30 CEST (UTC+2)	Karelis 12'; Marinakis (yellow card) 34'; Mavrias (yellow card) 51'; Triantafyllopoulos (yellow card) 59'; Gianniotas 88' (pen.), 90+3'	Report	Przybyłko 24'; Dawidowicz (yellow card) 26'; Wszołek (yellow card) 48'	Referee: Bastian Dankert (Germany)

=== Poland U-20 national team ===
4 September 2014 U-20 Four Nations Tournament	Poland	1 - 1	Switzerland	Stadion GOSiR Komorniki, Plewiska
17:00 CEST (UTC+2)	Murawski 74'	Report	Corbaz 10'	Attendance: 1,000; Referee: Robert Kempter (Germany)

9 September 2014 U-20 Four Nations Tournament	Italy	1 - 3	Poland	Stadio Degli Ulivi, Andria
15:00 CEST (UTC+2)	Garritano 17'	Report	Frankowski 7'; Straus 28'; Dźwigała 86'	Referee: Luca Gut (Switzerland)

9 October 2014 U-20 Four Nations Tournament	Poland	2 - 1	Italy	Arena Lublin, Lublin
18:30 CEST (UTC+2)	Stępiński 3'; Frankowski 85'	Report	Manconi 49'	Attendance: 13,850; Referee: Benjamin Kortus (Germany)

13 October 2014 U-20 Four Nations Tournament	Switzerland	1 - 2	Poland	Stade de la Fontenette, Carouge
18:00 CEST (UTC+2)	Tarashaj 29'; Bertone (yellow card) 82', (red card) 90+3'	Report	Stępiński 36' (pen.); Sadzawicki (yellow card) 51'; Zieliński (yellow card) 64'; Kędziora (yellow card) 73'; Formella 76'; Klemenz (yellow card) 90' (yellow-red card) 90+2'

16 November 2014 U-20 Four Nations Tournament	Poland	0 - 2	Germany	Stadion Florian Krygier, Szczecin
17:00 CET (UTC+1)	Straus (yellow card) 61'; Uryga (yellow card) 68'	Report	Selke 4', (yellow card) 54', (red card) 54'; Kerk 53' (pen.); Mukhtar (yellow card) 66'; Wittek (yellow card) 80'	Referee: Sandro Schärer (Switzerland)

27 March 2015 U-20 Four Nations Tournament	Germany	1 - 2	Poland	Ernst-Abbe-Sportfeld, Jena
14:00 CET (UTC+1)	Stendera 77' (pen.)	Report	Stępiński 69', (yellow card) 87'; Zieliński 74'	Referee: Dino Tommasi (Italy)

11 June 2015 Friendly	Poland	0 - 1	Slovakia	Stadion im. Ojca Władysława Augustynka, Nowy Sącz
17:00 CEST (UTC+2)		Report	Rusnák 72'	Referee: Piotr Lasyk (Poland)

=== Poland U-19 national team ===
4 September 2014 Friendly	Slovenia	2 - 2	Poland	ŠRC Bakovci Stadion, Bakovci
16:00 CEST (UTC+2)	Ožbolt 37'; Gajič 54'	Report	Zawada 78', 88'	Referee: Miran Bukovec (Slovenia)

9 September 2014 Friendly	Poland	1 - 2	Italy	Stadion im. Ojca Władysława Augustynka, Nowy Sącz
19:00 CEST (UTC+2)	Zawada 55'	Report	Parigini 32'; Calabria 90'	Attendance: 1,000; Referee: Sebastian Jarzębak (Poland)

9 October 2014 UEFA Euro. U-19 Champ. qual.	Poland	4 - 1	Moldova	Stadion Miejski, Tuchola
15:30 CEST (UTC+2)	Zawada 6'; Kapustka 41'; Popovici 49' (o.g.); Drągowski (yellow card) 60'; Tomasiewicz 81' (pen.)	Report	Urvanţev (yellow card) 60'; Macriţchii (yellow card) 80'; Bejan 86'	Referee: Ognjen Valjić (Bosnia and Herzegovina)

11 October 2014 UEFA Euro. U-19 Champ. qual.	Poland	3 - 0	Andorra	Stadion Miejski im. Inowrocławskich Olimpijczyków, Inowrocław
15:00 CEST (UTC+2)	Tomasiewicz 11' (pen.); Buksa 30', 44'; Bednarek (yellow card) 32'; Bochniewicz (yellow card) 75'	Report	Villagrasa (yellow card) 10'; Bove (yellow card) 27'; Silverio (yellow card) 41'; Aláez (yellow card) 56'; Reyes (yellow card) 75'; Novo Martins (yellow card) 88'	Referee: Sergėjus Slyva (Lithuania)

14 October 2014 UEFA Euro. U-19 Champ. qual.	Poland	1 - 2	Netherlands	Stadion Centralny, Grudziądz
15:30 CEST (UTC+2)	Bochniewicz (yellow card) 36'; Dankowski 39'; Jastrzembski (yellow card) 45'; Grzybek (yellow card) 62'; Łysiak (yellow card) 82'	Report	Nouri 44'; Riedewald (yellow card) 55'; Kallon 75'; Ould-Chikh (yellow card) 90+3'	Attendance: 1,000; Referee: Vlado Glođović (Serbia)

13 November 2014 Friendly	Turkey	2 - 1	Poland	Buca Arena, İzmir
13:00 CEST (UTC+2)	Çamoğlu 23'; Erzoy (yellow card) 49'; Bekaroğlu (yellow card) 85'; Yaman (yellow card) 87'; İleri 90'	Report	Dankowski (yellow card) 38'; Erzoy 68' (o.g.); Łysiak (yellow card) 87'; Gulczyński (yellow card) 90'	Referee: Yaşar Can Temizel (Turkey)

28 March 2015 Friendly	Georgia	1 - 4	Poland	Belek
15:30 CET (UTC+1)	Unknown player 45' (pen.)	Report	Serafin 58'; Buksa 60'; Łysiak 67', 78'

30 March 2015 Friendly	Georgia	0 - 0	Poland	Belek
14:30 CEST (UTC+2)		Report

14 May 2015 UEFA Euro. U-19 Champ. qual.	Montenegro	2 - 1	Poland	Stadion Pecara, Široki Brijeg
17:00 CEST (UTC+2)	Kukuličić (yellow card) 23'; Vujnović 55', 87'; Lončar (yellow card) 77'	Report	Buksa 88'	Referee: Thorvaldur Árnason (Iceland)

18 May 2015 UEFA Euro. U-19 Champ. qual.	Ukraine	4 - 2	Poland	Stadion pod Bijelim Brijegom, Mostar
17:00 CEST (UTC+2)	Vachiberadze 16' (pen.), 66' (pen.), (yellow card) 31'; Arendaruk 41'; Tsygankov (penalty missed) 59'; Osman (yellow card) 68'; Lukyanchuk (yellow card) 74', (goal) 77'	Report	Buksa (yellow card) 32'; Tomasiewicz (yellow card) 49'; Kuchta (red card) 56'; Wieteska (yellow card) 65'; Zawada 79'; Łukowski 83'; Kuzdra (yellow card) 86'; Dankowski (yellow card) 90'	Referee: Tolga Özkalfa (Turkey)

19 May 2015 UEFA Euro. U-19 Champ. qual.	Bosnia and Herzegovina	2 - 0	Poland	Stadion pod Bijelim Brijegom, Mostar
17:00 CEST (UTC+2)	Anđušić (yellow card) 12', (goal) 63'; Kuzmanović 76'	Report	Stolarski (yellow card) 32', (penalty missed) 37'; Makowski (yellow card) 34'	Referee: Thorvaldur Árnason (Iceland)

=== Poland U-18 national team ===
15 November 2014 Friendly	Poland	2 - 3	England	Stadion GOSiR, Gdynia
17:00 CET (UTC+1)	Walczak (yellow card) 21'; Walski 42'; Olczyk 74'	Report	Connolly 50'; Maitland-Niles 60'; Moore (yellow card) 68'; Armstrong 69'	Referee: Zbigniew Dobrynin (Poland)

17 November 2014 Friendly	Poland	1 - 4	England	MOSiR Stadium, Gdańsk
17:00 CET (UTC+1)	Pytlik 10'; Walczak (yellow card) 49'; Piechowiak (yellow card) 51'	Report	Solanke 11'; Ledson 50'; Ojo 52' (pen.), 70'; Walker-Peters (yellow card) 90'	Referee: Marcin Szczerbowicz (Poland)

3 March 2015 Friendly	Serbia	5 - 2	Poland	Stara Pazova
14:00 CET (UTC+1)	Lutovac 3', 68'; Jović 21'; Janković 40'; Šaponjić 53'	Report	Piechowiak 40'; Borecki 71'	Attendance: 200; Referee: Saša Živković (Serbia)

5 March 2015 Friendly	Romania	0 - 3	Poland	Stara Pazova
14:00 CET (UTC+1)		Report	Piechniak 8'; Żmijewski 74'; Sobków 83'

24 March 2015 2015 Federation Cup	Georgia	0 - 1	Poland	Rīgas Hanzas vidusskolas stadions, Riga
14:00 CET (UTC+1)		Report	Walczak 73' (pen.)

25 March 2015 2015 Federation Cup	Latvia	1 - 1	Poland	Rīgas Hanzas vidusskolas stadions, Riga
14:00 CET (UTC+1)	Labanovskis 48'	Report	Świderski 9'	Referee: Andris Utināns (Latvia)

27 March 2015 2015 Federation Cup	Ukraine	3 - 1	Poland	Rīgas Hanzas vidusskolas stadions, Riga
10:00 CET (UTC+1)	Mykhaylichenko 32'; Pikhalyonok 35'; Shepelev 84'	Report	Sobków 76'

20 April 2015 2015 Slovakia Cup	China	1 - 1	Poland	Stadium Myjava, Myjava
15:00 CEST (UTC+1)	Liangming 25'	Report	Peda 76'	Referee: Jiří Houdek (Czech Republic)
Note: 2x40 minutes halves

21 April 2015 2015 Slovakia Cup	Slovakia	1 - 1	Poland	Modranka
11:00 CEST (UTC+1)	Krč 60'	Report	Gajewski 30'	Referee: Sigurd Kringstad (Norway)
Note: 2x40 minutes halves

23 April 2015 2015 Slovakia Cup	Canada	1 - 1	Poland	Modranka
11:00 CEST (UTC+1)	Uccello 18'	Report	Piechniak 80' (pen.)	Referee: Filip Glova (Slovakia)
Note: 2x40 minutes halves

24 April 2015 2015 Slovakia Cup	Russia	0 - 1	Poland	Senec
11:00 CEST (UTC+1)		Report	Gajewski 14'
Note: 2x40 minutes halves

=== Poland U-17 national team ===
26 August 2014 Puchar Syrenki	Poland	1 - 0	Latvia	Stadion MZOS, Pruszków
15:00 CEST (UTC+2)	Wojtkowski 4'	Report		Referee: Dominik Sulikowski (Poland)
Note: 2x40 minutes halves

27 August 2014 Puchar Syrenki	Poland	3 - 0	Norway	Stadion MZOS, Pruszków
17:30 CEST (UTC+2)	Laudal 12' (o.g.); Mystkowski 29'; Listkowski 72'	Report		Referee: Rafał Sawicki (Poland)
Note: 2x40 minutes halves

29 August 2014 Puchar Syrenki	Poland	4 - 0	Sweden	Stadion Miejski, Sulejówek
16:00 CEST (UTC+2)	Bielik 11', 44'; Listkowski 22'; Dzięcioł 72' (pen.)	Report		Referee: Tomasz Musiał (Poland)
Note: 2x40 minutes halves

25 September 2014 Friendly	Luxembourg	2 - 4	Poland	Consdorf
19:00 CEST (UTC+2)	Unknown player ??'; Unknown player ??'	Report	Adamczyk ??', ??'; Czarnowski ??'; Wojtkowski ??'
Note: 2x40 minutes halves

26 October 2014 UEFA Euro. U-17 Champ. qual.	Estonia	0 - 4	Poland	Mikheil Meskhi-2 Stadium, Tbilisi
10:00 CET (UTC+1)	Villota (yellow card) 11'; Kannel (yellow card) 25'; Kuusma (yellow card) 65'	Report	Wojtkowski 7', 12' (pen.); Prusaczyk (yellow card) 38'; Adamczyk 80', 80+4'	Referee: Mihály Fábián (Hungary)
Note: 2x40 minutes halves

28 October 2014 UEFA Euro. U-17 Champ. qual.	Liechtenstein	0 - 4	Poland	Mikheil Meskhi-2 Stadium, Tbilisi
10:00 CET (UTC+1)		Report	Seemann 26' (o.g.); Bielik 43'; Jóźwiak 60'; Wojtkowski 80+2'	Referee: Tvetan Krastev (Bulgaria)
Note: 2x40 minutes halves

31 October 2014 UEFA Euro. U-17 Champ. qual.	Georgia	0 - 1	Poland	Mikheil Meskhi Stadium, Tbilisi
12:00 CET (UTC+1)	Kurshavishvili (yellow card) 51'; Kurashvili (yellow card) 55'	Report	Prusaczyk 19'; Mystkowski (yellow card) 51'; Dziczek (yellow card) 71'; Wojdak (yellow card) 80+3'	Referee: Tvetan Krastev (Bulgaria)
Note: 2x40 minutes halves

11 February 2015 Friendly	Norway	0 - 3	Poland	La Manga Stadium, La Manga
16:00 CET (UTC+1)		Report	Wojtkowski 25'; Hołownia 49'; Kowalczyk 77'
Note: 2x40 minutes halves

13 February 2015 Friendly	Sweden	0 - 4	Poland	La Manga Stadium, La Manga
16:00 CET (UTC+1)		Report	Listkowski 10'; Spychała 60'; Ostaszewski 67'; Leleno 71'
Note: 2x40 minutes halves

15 February 2015 Friendly	Denmark	1 - 0	Poland	La Manga Stadium, La Manga
13:00 CET (UTC+1)	Dreyer 19'	Report
Note: 2x40 minutes halves

21 March 2015 UEFA Euro. U-17 Champ. qual.	Poland	0 - 2	Belarus	Stadion Dyskobolii, Grodzisk Wielkopolski
17:30 CET (UTC+1)		Report	Belezyak 28', 75', (yellow card) 78'	Referee: Srđan Jovanović (Serbia)
Note: 2x40 minutes halves

23 March 2015 UEFA Euro. U-17 Champ. qual.	Poland	0 - 1	Greece	Stadion Dyskobolii, Grodzisk Wielkopolski
18:00 CET (UTC+1)	Wojdak (yellow card) 40'; Spychała (yellow card) 56'; Bielik (yellow card) 80+2'	Report	Tsingos 25'; Nikolaou (yellow card) 80+2'	Attendance: 400; Referee: Giorgi Kruashvili (Georgia)
Note: 2x40 minutes halves

26 March 2015 UEFA Euro. U-17 Champ. qual.	Poland	1 - 0	Republic of Ireland	Stadion Dyskobolii, Grodzisk Wielkopolski
18:00 CET (UTC+1)	Kaczmarczyk 10', (yellow card) 65'	Report	Stokes (yellow card) 48'; O'Keeffe (yellow card) 60'	Referee: Orkhan Mammadov (Azerbaijan)
Note: 2x40 minutes halves

=== Poland U-16 national team ===
15 September 2014 Friendly	Poland	5 - 0	Northern Ireland	Stadion Miejski, Złocieniec
16:30 CEST (UTC+2)	Kwietniewski 11'; Macierzyński 38'; Chodyna 55'; Gajda 58'; Kurminowski 74'	Report
Note: 2x40 minutes halves

17 September 2014 Friendly	Poland	1 - 1	Northern Ireland	Stadion Miejski, Kołobrzeg
19:00 CEST (UTC+2)	Bondarenko 20'	Report	Parkhouse 74'	Attendance: 2,500; Referee: Artur Aluszyk (Poland)
Note: 2x40 minutes halves

21 October 2014 Friendly	Poland	3 - 2	Switzerland	Stadion OSiR, Świebodzin
15:00 CEST (UTC+2)	Macierzyński 16'; Wiktoruk 27'; Makowski (yellow card) 30'; Bondarenko (yellow card) 32'; D. Pawłowski 80+2', (yellow card) 80+2'	Report	Kargbo (yellow card) 17'; Ndau (yellow card) 54'; Blasucci 61'; Bartelli 71'	Attendance: 2,000
Note: 2x40 minutes halves

23 October 2014 Friendly	Poland	3 - 0	Switzerland	Stadion Miejski, Międzyrzecz
15:00 CEST (UTC+2)	Wodniok 53'; D. Pawłowski 60'; Macierzyński 63', (yellow card) 63'	Report	Ndau (yellow card) 45'	Referee: Jarosław Rynkiewicz (Poland)
Note: 2x40 minutes halves

18 March 2015 Friendly	Malta	1 - 3	Poland	Ta' Qali
18:00 CET (UTC+2)	Mifsud 59'	Report	Jadach 14'; Kwietniewski 34', 45'
Note: 2x40 minutes halves

20 March 2015 Friendly	Malta	0 - 3	Poland	Ta' Qali
18:00 CET (UTC+2)		Report	Chodyna 29'; Puchacz 43'; Kwietniewski 80'
Note: 2x40 minutes halves

27 April 2015 UEFA U-16 Devel. Tourn.	Turkey	1 - 1 (5 - 6 p)	Poland	Beit Hanivharot, Shefayim
13:00 CEST (UTC+1)	Tosun 31'	Report	Macierzyński 54' (pen.)
Note: 2x40 minutes halves

28 April 2015 UEFA U-16 Devel. Tourn.	Ukraine	1 - 1 (4 - 5 p)	Poland	Beit Hanivharot, Shefayim
13:00 CEST (UTC+1)	Bondar 9'; Avramenko 30'	Report	Macierzyński 10'; Chodyna 19'
Note: 2x40 minutes halves

30 April 2015 UEFA U-16 Devel. Tourn.	Israel	2 - 1	Poland	Beit Hanivharot, Shefayim
9:00 CEST (UTC+1)	Butbul 24'; Dahan 46'	Report	Wiktoruk 36'
Note: 2x40 minutes halves

4 June 2015 Friendly	Romania	1 - 1	Poland	Centrul de Fotbal Buftea, Buftea
17:30 CEST (UTC+1)	Chrzanowski 25' (o.g.)	Report	Kopacz 34'	Referee: Adrian Ilyeș (Romania)
Note: 2x40 minutes halves

6 June 2015 Friendly	Romania	0 - 2	Poland	Centrul de Fotbal Buftea, Buftea
10:00 CEST (UTC+1)		Report	Szymański 55' (pen.); Grym 61'
Note: 2x40 minutes halves

=== Poland U-15 national team ===
11 November 2014 Friendly	Poland	2 - 1	Republic of Ireland	Gminny Kompleks Sportowy, Mniów
14:30 CET (UTC+1)	Sinior 5'; Starzycki 53'	Report	McAuley 48' (pen.)
Note: 2x40 minutes halves

13 November 2014 Friendly	Poland	2 - 1	Republic of Ireland	Strawczyn
12:00 CET (UTC+1)	Kafka 33'; Walukiewicz 52'	Report	McAuley 68'
Note: 2x40 minutes halves

11 March 2015 Friendly	Poland	2 - 2	Wales	Stadion Miejski, Płock
12:00 CET (UTC+1)	Szwed 26'; Walukiewicz 60'	Report	Holsgrove 54'; Proctor 57'
Note: 2x40 minutes halves

13 March 2015 Friendly	Poland	3 - 1	Wales	Stadion Miejski, Płock
12:00 CET (UTC+1)	Bargiel 32', 73'; Szwed 75'	Report	Jones-Thomas 15'
Note: 2x40 minutes halves

15 April 2015 Friendly	Finland	1 - 1	Poland	Národné tréningové centrum Senec, Senec
11:00 CEST (UTC+2)	Jokelainen 38'	Report	Szwed 12'
Note: 2x40 minutes halves

16 April 2015 Friendly	Slovakia	0 - 1	Poland	Národné tréningové centrum Senec, Senec
11:00 CEST (UTC+2)		Report	Starzycki 34'	Attendance: 100; Referee: Marián Vašš (Slovakia)
Note: 2x40 minutes halves

10 June 2015 Friendly	Poland	2 - 2	Scotland	Stadion Miejski, Kluczbork
14:00 CEST (UTC+2)	Szwed 20'; Praszelik 26'	Report	Hutchison 23'; Aitchison 39'
Note: 2x40 minutes halves

12 June 2015 Friendly	Poland	3 - 1	Scotland	Stadion MOSiR, Brzeg
12:00 CEST (UTC+2)	Szwed 3'; Praszelik 51'; Jastrzembski 79'	Report	Middleton 12'	Attendance: 2,000; Referee: Karolina Radzik-Johan (Poland)
Note: 2x40 minutes halves

== Women's football ==
=== Poland women's national team ===
16 July 2014 Friendly	Poland	5 - 1	Estonia	Stadion MZOS, Pruszków
11:00 CEST (UTC+2)	Płonowska 12'; Pajor 26', 51', 55'; Kamczyk 47'	Report	Aarna 64'

21 August 2014 FIFA Women's World Cup qual.	Poland	0 - 4	Sweden	Stadion Miejski, Starogard Gdański
17:00 CEST (UTC+2)		Report	Schelin 8', 71'; Asllani 56'; Sembrant 89'	Attendance: 1,500; Referee: Stéphanie Frappart (France)

13 September 2014 FIFA Women's World Cup qual.	Poland	4 - 0	Northern Ireland	Stadion Miejski, Toruń
16:00 CEST (UTC+2)	Sikora 33'; Pajor 35', 68'; Balcerzak 41'	Report	Vance (yellow card) 90+2'	Referee: Sharon Sluyts (Belgium)

17 September 2014 FIFA Women's World Cup qual.	Poland	3 - 1	Bosnia and Herzegovina	Stadion OSiR, Włocławek
18:30 CEST (UTC+2)	Pakulska 19' (pen.); Pajor 29'; Kamczyk 33'; Balcerzak (yellow card) 87'	Report	Dijaković (yellow card) 26'; Spahić (yellow card) 37'; Ahmić 42'; Nikolić (yellow card) 70'	Attendance: 3,780; Referee: Amy Rayner (England)

30 October 2014 Friendly	Poland	4 - 1	Slovakia	Stadion LKS-u, Nieciecza
11:00 CET (UTC+1)	Kamczyk 41'; Kaletka 68'; Pajor 78'; Pakulska 90'	Report	Mravíková 65'	Attendance: 300; Referee: Agnieszka Płaskocińska (Poland)

22 November 2014 Friendly	Poland	1 - 4	Belgium	Stadion Ludowy, Sosnowiec
13:00 CET (UTC+1)	Kaletka 36'	Report	Cayman 48'; Wullaert 56'; De Caigny 58'; Mermans 62'	Attendance: 800; Referee: Karolina Radzik-Johan (Poland)

11 February 2015 Friendly	Hungary	2 - 7	Poland	Lipót
12:00 CET (UTC+1)	Sipos 11'; Vágó 36'	Report	Pajor 13'; Sikora 16'; Zapała 27', 66'; Grabowska 60'; Tarczyńska 79'; Chudzik 82'

4 March 2015 Friendly	Northern Ireland	0 - 2	Poland	Stadion Mladost, Rovinjsko Selo
11:30 CET (UTC+1)		Report	Sikora 55'; Blacerzak 90'	Referee: Séverine Zinck (France)

6 March 2015 Friendly	Croatia	0 - 0	Poland	Buje
14:00 CET (UTC+1)		Report

9 March 2015 Friendly	Romania	0 - 2	Poland	Umag
11:30 CET (UTC+1)		Report	Pajor 16'; Balcerzak 35'

11 March 2015 Friendly	Slovakia	0 - 2	Poland	Poreč
15:00 CET (UTC+1)	Klechová (penalty missed) 65'	Report	Balcerzak 15'; Pajor 68'

6 April 2015 Friendly	Finland	1 - 3	Poland	Eerikkilän Urheiluopisto, Eerikkilä
15:00 CEST (UTC+2)	Engman 69'; Saari (penalty missed) 76'	Report	Kamczyk 40'; Chudzik 58'; Grabowska 89'	Referee: Tess Pettersson (Sweden)

=== Polish women's clubs in Europe ===
==== Medyk Konin ====
9 August 2014 Qualifying round	SFK 2000 (Bosnia and Herzegovina)	0 - 3	(Poland) Medyk Konin	Stadion Otoka, Sarajevo
10:30 CEST (UTC+2)	Piskić (yellow card) 73'; Jašarević (yellow card) 79'; Hadžić (yellow card) 90+2'	Report	Pajor 6'; Gawrońska 14'; Pakulska 53'	Referee: Sara Persson (Sweden)

11 August 2014 Qualifying round	Åland United (Finland)	0 - 7	(Poland) Medyk Konin	Stadion Otoka, Sarajevo
16:30 CEST (UTC+2)	Dolinsky (yellow card) 34'; Sundlöv (red card) 55'	Report	Pajor 22', 48', 84', 90+1'; Gawrońska 44'; Sikora 53'; Kamczyk 79'	Referee: Paula Brady (Republic of Ireland)

14 August 2014 Qualifying round	ŽFK Kochani (North Macedonia)	1 - 11	(Poland) Medyk Konin	Asim Ferhatović Hase Stadium, Sarajevo
17:00 CEST (UTC+2)	Naumoff (yellow card) 32'; Stojanoska (yellow card) 43'; Jakovska 60'; Todorovska (yellow card) 70'	Report	Pakulska 4', 71'; Gawrońska 7', 56', 78'; Kamczyk 9'; Pajor 35', 58'; Dudek 49'; Žigić 81'; Zawiślak 86' (pen.)	Referee: Knarik Grigoryan (Armenia)

8 October 2014 Round of 32	Medyk Konin (Poland)	2 - 0	(Scotland) Glasgow City	Stadion Miejski, Konin
15:30 CEST (UTC+2)	Pajor 53'; Sikora 64'	Report		Referee: Sandra Bastos (Portugal)

15 October 2014 Round of 32	Glasgow City (Scotland)	3 - 0 (a.e.t.) (3 - 2 agg.)	(Poland) Medyk Konin	Excelsior Stadium, Airdrie
20:30 CEST (UTC+2)	Black (yellow card) 44'; O'Sullivan (yellow card) 49', (goal) 94'; Love 59'; McSorley (yellow card) 66'; Fairlie 77'	Report	Pakulska (yellow card) 42'; Szymańska (yellow card) 49'	Referee: Anastasia Pustovoitova (Russia)
