= Szwed =

Szwed is a Polish family name. It corresponds to Russian Shved and Lithuanian Švedas. In all these languages the word means "Swede". Notable people with the surname include:

- Aleksander Szwed (born 1982), Polish politician
- Aleksandra Szwed (born 1990), Polish actress and singer
- Dariusz Szwed (born 1967), Polish politician
- John Szwed (born 1936), American musicologist
- Karolina Szwed-Orneborg (born 1989), Polish handball player
- Loretta Szwed (born 1937), birth name of Loretta Swit, actress
- Maksymilian Szwed (born 2004), Polish sprint athlete
- Mateusz Szwed (born 2000), Polish association footballer
- Rafał Szwed (born 1973), Polish association footballer
- Stanisław Szwed (born 1955), Polish politician
- Zuzanna Szwed (born 1977), Polish figure skater
