= Lysiak =

Lysiak or Łysiak is a surname of Polish-language origin. Notable people with the surname include:

- Hilde Lysiak (born 2006), American journalist
- Ivan Lysiak-Rudnytsky (1919–1984), Ukrainian historian
- Krystyna Łysiak, Polish para table tennis player
- Paweł Łysiak (born 1996), Polish football player
- Tom Lysiak (1953–2016), Canadian ice hockey player
- Waldemar Łysiak (born 1944), Polish author
