= 2020–21 Jagiellonia Białystok season =

Jagiellonia Białystok
2020–21 season
- Chairman: Cezary Kulesza
- Manager: Bogdan Zając
- Stadium: Stadion Miejski, Białystok
- Ekstraklasa: 9th
- Polish Cup: Round of 64
- Top goalscorer: League: Jesús Imaz; Jakov Puljić (9 each); All: Jesús Imaz; Jakov Puljić (9 each)
Home colours
- All statistics correct as of 27 November 2020.

In the 2020–21 season, Jagiellonia Białystok competed in Ekstraklasa, and the season's Polish Cup edition, as they were eliminated by Górnik Zabrze, following the 1–3 defeat in the round of 64.

== Players ==
As of 4 November 2020.

Note: Flags indicate national team as defined under FIFA eligibility rules; some limited exceptions apply. Players may hold more than one non-FIFA nationality.

No.	Pos.	Nation	Player
1	GK	(Latvia) LVA	Pāvels Šteinbors
2	DF	(Slovakia) SVK	Andrej Kadlec
3	DF	(Poland) POL	Błażej Augustyn
6	MF	(Poland) POL	Taras Romanczuk (captain)
8	MF	(Poland) POL	Przemysław Mystkowski
9	FW	(Poland) POL	Szymon Sobczak
10	MF	(Poland) POL	Maciej Makuszewski
11	MF	(Spain) ESP	Jesús Imaz
13	MF	(Lithuania) LTU	Fedor Černych
14	MF	(Czech Republic) CZE	Tomáš Přikryl
15	MF	(Canada) CAN	Kris Twardek
16	MF	(Poland) POL	Ariel Borysiuk
17	DF	(Croatia) CRO	Ivan Runje
19	DF	(Iceland) ISL	Böðvar Böðvarsson

No.	Pos.	Nation	Player
21	FW	(Croatia) CRO	Jakov Puljić
23	MF	(Spain) ESP	Fernań López
25	DF	(Romania) ROU	Bogdan Țîru
26	MF	(Czech Republic) CZE	Martin Pospíšil
27	DF	(Poland) POL	Bartłomiej Wdowik
28	MF	(Poland) POL	Kamil Wojtkowski
31	FW	(Poland) POL	Bartosz Bida
32	MF	(Poland) POL	Mateusz Wyjadłowski
33	GK	(Poland) POL	Hubert Gostomski
36	FW	(Poland) POL	Maciej Bortniczuk
38	DF	(Poland) POL	Paweł Olszewski
44	FW	(Poland) POL	Krzysztof Toporkiewicz
55	GK	(Poland) POL	Xavier Dziekoński
96	GK	(Poland) POL	Damian Węglarz

== Competitions ==
=== Ekstraklasa ===
==== Standings ====
Pos	Team	Pld	W	D	L	GF	GA	GD	Pts
7	Lechia Gdańsk	30	12	6	12	40	37	+3	42 (Note: Head-to-head points: Piast Gliwice 4, Lechia Gdańsk 1.)
8	Zagłębie Lubin	30	11	8	11	38	40	−2	41
9	Jagiellonia Białystok	30	10	7	13	39	48	−9	37 (Note: Head-to-head points: Jagiellonia Białystok 9, Górnik Zabrze 5, Lech Poznań 2.)
10	Górnik Zabrze	30	10	7	13	31	33	−2	37
11	Lech Poznań	30	9	10	11	39	38	+1	37

Source: ekstraklasa.org
Rules for classification: 1) Points; 2) Head-to-head points; 3) Head-to-head goal difference; 4) Head-to-head goals scored; 5) Head-to-head away goals scored (only if between two teams); 6) Goal difference; 7) Goals scored; 8) Number of wins; 9) Number of away wins; 10) Fairplay ranking; 11) Draw

==== Matches ====
Ekstraklasa match details
Date	Opponent	Venue	Result F–A	Scorers	Attendance	Ref.
24 August 2020	Wisła Kraków	H	1–1	Makuszewski 25'	5,070 (Note: Stadium was capped at 50% capacity due to COVID-19 pandemic.)	
29 August 2020	Legia Warszawa	A	2–1	Puljić 19', Imaz 28'	9,109	
11 September 2020	Podbeskidzie Bielsko-Biała	H	2–2	Puljić 49', Imaz 51'	5,065	
21 September 2020	Piast Gliwice	A	1–0	Imaz 58'	2,649	
26 September 2020	Zagłębie Lubin	H	0–1		5,881	
17 October 2020	Lech Poznań	H	2–1	Romanczuk 2', Makuszewski 68'	0 (Note: Match played behind closed doors due to COVID-19 pandemic.)	
24 October 2020	Śląsk Wrocław	A	0–1		0	
30 October 2020	Pogoń Szczecin	A	0–3		0	
7 November 2020	Cracovia	A	1–3	Imaz 39'	0	
23 November 2020	Wisła Płock	H	5–2	Puljić 13', 46', 66', Imaz 16', Pospíšil 62'	0	
28 November 2020	Stal Mielec	A	1–3	Mystkowski 6'	0	
5 December 2020	Warta Poznań	H	4–3	Puljić 19', 59', 90' pen., Imaz 28',	0	
13 December 2020	Raków Częstochowa	A	2–3	Makuszewski 69' Imaz 90'	0	
20 December 2020	Górnik Zabrze	H	1–0	Imaz 52'	0	
30 January 2021	Lechia Gdańsk	A	2–0	Imaz 3' Puljić 84'	0	
7 February 2021	Wisła Kraków	A	0–2		0	
14 February 2021	Legia Warszawa	H	1–1	Imaz 4' pen.	0	
20 February 2021	Podbeskidzie Bielsko-Biała	A	1–1	Wdowik 53'	0	
27 February 2021	Piast Gliwice	H	0–1		0	
6 March 2021	Zagłębie Lubin	A	0–3		0	
12 March 2021	Pogoń Szczecin	H	0–1		0	
20 March 2021	Lech Poznań	A	3–2	Černych 2', Nastić 72', Wdowik 87'	0	
5 April 2021	Śląsk Wrocław	H	0–1		0	
9 April 2021	Cracovia	H	2–1	Bida 26', Romanczuk 37'	0	
18 April 2021	Wisła Płock	A	2–2	Imaz 35', Bida 61'	0	
21 April 2021	Stal Mielec	H	3–3	Tiru 3', 85', Přikryl 12'	0	
25 April 2021	Warta Poznań	A	0–2		0	
28 April 2021	Raków Częstochowa	H	0–0		0	
7 May 2021	Górnik Zabrze	A	1–3	Puljić 15'	0	
16 May 2021	Lechia Gdańsk	H	2–1	Puljić 9' pen., Přikryl 78'	4,572	

=== Polish Cup ===
Polish Cup match details
Round	Date	Time	Opponent	Venue	Result F–A	Scorers	Attendance	Ref.
Round of 64	13 August 2020	20:30	Górnik Zabrze	Away	1–3	Puljić 33'	4,568	
