= Spychała =

Spychała may refer to:

- Czesław Spychała (1917–1994), Polish tennis player
- Mateusz Spychała (born 1998), Polish footballer

== See also ==
- Marian Spychalski (1906–1980), Polish architect, military commander, and politician
