= Švedas =

- Lithuanian surname
- m.: Švedas
- f.: (unmarried): Švedaitė
- f.: (married): Švedienė

Švedas is a Lithuanian language family name. It corresponds to Russian Shved and Polish Szwed or Szweda. In all these languages the word means "Swede".

The surname may refer to:

- Jonas Švedas (1908–1971), Lithuanian composer
- Robertas Švedas, Lithuanian handballer
- Romas Švedas (born 1970), Lithuanian politician, viceminister of energy
