= Olczak =

Olczak is a surname. Notable people with the surname include:

- Arek Olczak (born 1963), Australian wrestler
- Jacek Olczak (born 1965), Polish businessman
- Joanna Olczak-Ronikier (born 1934), Polish writer
- Marta Olczak (born 1994), Polish figure skater

== See also ==
- Olczyk
