= Olczyk =

Olczyk is a Polish surname. Notable people with the surname include:

- Eddie Olczyk (born 1966), American ice hockey player and coach
- Michael Olczyk (born 1977), Polish footballer
- Nick Olczyk (born 1996), American sports analyst
- Rick Olczyk (born 1970), American ice hockey executive
- Stanisław Olczyk (1935–1991), Polish ice hockey player
