= Bartłomiej Babiarz =

Polish footballer (born 1989)

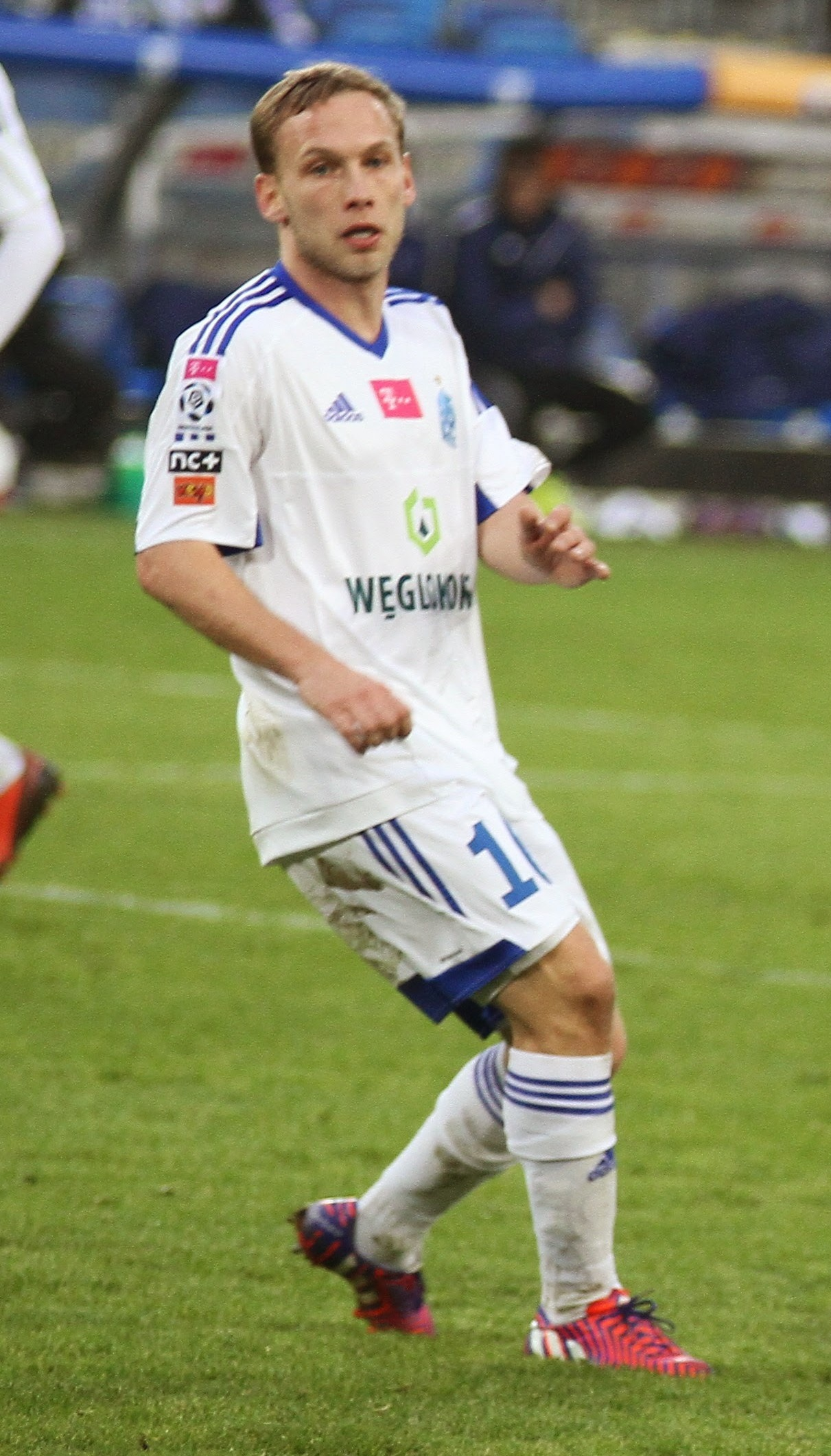
- Babiarz with Ruch Chorzów in 2015

Personal information
- Full name: Bartłomiej Babiarz
- Date of birth: 3 February 1989 (age 37)
- Place of birth: Katowice, Poland
- Height: 1.71 m (5 ft 7 1/2 in)
- Position: Central midfielder

Team information
- Current team: Wieczysta Kraków (assistant)

Youth career
- –2006: Hetman 22 Katowice
- 2006–2008: Ruch Chorzów

Senior career*
Years	Team	Apps	(Gls)
2008–2009	Ruch Chorzów	0	(0)
2009–2013	GKS Tychy	125	(7)
2013–2015	Ruch Chorzów	65	(2)
2013–2014	Ruch Chorzów II	4	(0)
2015–2017	Bruk-Bet Termalica	65	(4)
2017	Apollon Smyrnis	3	(0)
2018–2020	Zagłębie Sosnowiec	39	(0)
2020–2022	Wigry Suwałki	60	(2)
2022–2023	Skra Częstochowa	30	(0)
Total		391	(16)
- * Club domestic league appearances and goals

Bartłomiej Babiarz (born 3 February 1989) is a Polish former professional footballer who played as a central midfielder. Besides Poland, he has played in Greece. He currently serves as the assistant coach of Ekstraklasa club Wieczysta Kraków.

== Club career ==
On 17 August 2020, Babiarz signed a one-year contract with Wigry Suwałki.

== Post-playing career ==
Following retirement in 2023, Babiarz joined Warta Poznań's staff as a match analyst. In July 2024, he was hired by Raków Częstochowa to operate in a similar role. He left the club after the conclusion of the 2024–25 season. In July 2025, Babiarz joined ŁKS Łódź's coaching staff. He left ŁKS after the conclusion of the 2025–26 season. On 19 June 2026, he joined Odra Opole's coaching staff. Babiarz departed Odra alongside head coach Łukasz Tomczyk in October 2026; the following month, he joined him as an assistant to Jacek Zieliński at Ekstraklasa club Wieczysta Kraków.

== Career statistics ==
Appearances and goals by club, season and competition
Club	Season	League			National cup (Note: Includes Polish Cup, Greek Cup)		Europe		Other		Total	
Club	Season	Division	Apps	Goals	Apps	Goals	Apps	Goals	Apps	Goals	Apps	Goals
Ruch Chorzów	2008–09	Ekstraklasa	0	0	2	0	—		3 (Note: Appearances in Ekstraklasa Cup)	0	5	0
GKS Tychy	2009–10	II liga	32	0	4	0	—		—		36	0
GKS Tychy	2010–11	II liga	30	1	4	0	—		—		34	1
GKS Tychy	2011–12	II liga	32	3	0	0	—		—		32	3
GKS Tychy	2012–13	I liga	31	3	0	0	—		—		31	3
GKS Tychy	Total		125	7	8	0	—		—		133	7
Ruch Chorzów	2013–14	Ekstraklasa	29	1	1	0	—		—		30	1
Ruch Chorzów	2014–15	Ekstraklasa	36	1	1	0	6 (Note: Appearances in UEFA Europa League)	0	—		43	1
Ruch Chorzów	Total		65	2	2	0	6	0	—		73	2
Ruch Chorzów II	2013–14	III liga, group F	3	0	—		—		—		3	0
Ruch Chorzów II	2014–15	III liga, group F	1	0	—		—		—		1	0
Ruch Chorzów II	Total		4	0	—		—		—		4	0
Bruk-Bet Termalica Nieciecza	2015–16	Ekstraklasa	32	3	1	0	—		—		33	3
Bruk-Bet Termalica Nieciecza	2016–17	Ekstraklasa	33	1	1	0	—		—		34	1
Bruk-Bet Termalica Nieciecza	Total		65	4	2	0	—		—		67	4
Apollon Smyrnis	2017–18	Super League Greece	3	0	2	0	—		—		5	0
Zagłębie Sosnowiec	2017–18	I liga	10	0	—		—		—		10	0
Zagłębie Sosnowiec	2018–19	Ekstraklasa	12	1	1	0	—		—		13	1
Zagłębie Sosnowiec	2019–20	I liga	17	0	0	0	—		—		17	0
Zagłębie Sosnowiec	Total		39	1	1	0	—		—		40	1
Wigry Suwałki	2020–21	II liga	26	1	0	0	—		—		26	1
Wigry Suwałki	2021–22	II liga	34	1	1	0	—		—		35	1
Wigry Suwałki	Total		60	2	1	0	—		—		61	2
Skra Częstochowa	2022–23	I liga	30	0	1	0	—		—		31	0
Career total			391	16	19	0	6	0	3	0	419	16
