= Fedor Černych =

Russian-Lithuanian footballer

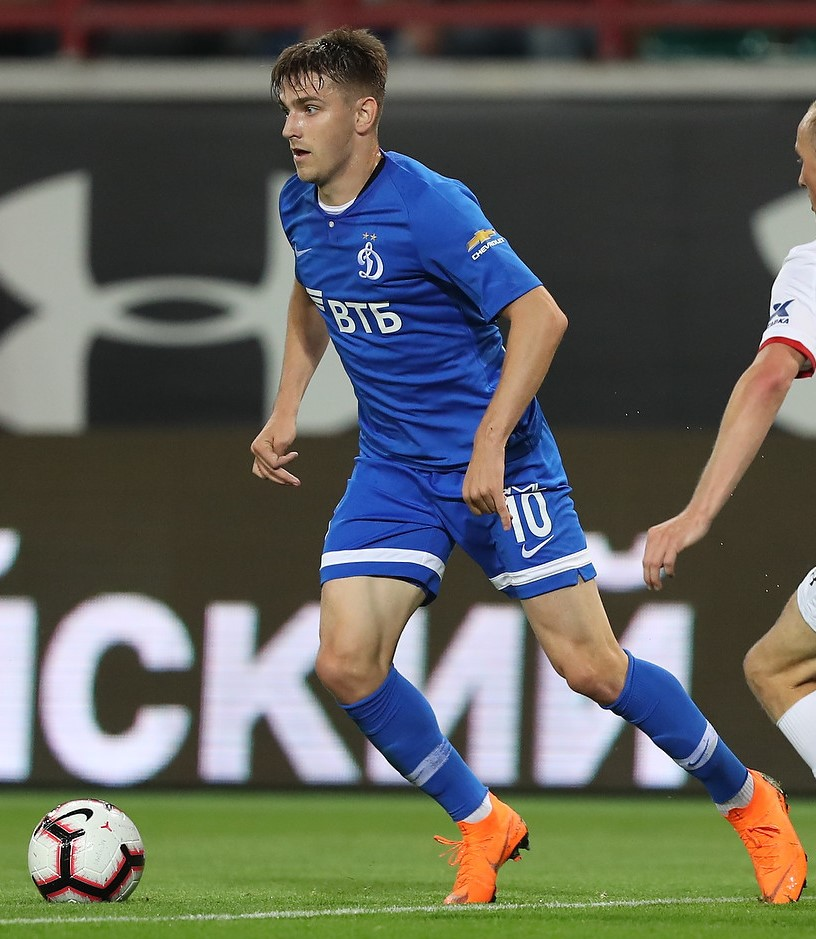
- Černych with Dynamo Moscow in 2018

Personal information
- Full name: Fedor Ivanovič Černych
- Date of birth: 21 May 1991 (age 35)
- Place of birth: Moscow, Russian SFSR, Soviet Union
- Height: 1.81 m (5 ft 11 in)
- Positions: Left winger; striker; attacking midfielder

Team information
- Current team: Kauno Žalgiris
- Number: 11

Youth career
- Vilnius Football School
- –2007: Granitas Vilnius

Senior career*
Years	Team	Apps	(Gls)
2007–2008	Granitas Vilnius		
2009–2014	Dnepr Mogilev	85	(14)
2012	→ Naftan Novopolotsk (loan)	30	(5)
2014–2015	Górnik Łęczna	38	(12)
2015–2017	Jagiellonia Białystok	82	(18)
2018–2020	Dynamo Moscow	31	(3)
2019–2020	→ Orenburg (loan)	11	(0)
2020–2023	Jagiellonia Białystok	61	(6)
2023	AEL Limassol	29	(1)
2024	Kerala Blasters	10	(3)
2024–	Kauno Žalgiris	83	(11)

International career^{‡}
2012–	Lithuania	103	(15)
- * Club domestic league appearances and goals as of 08 September 2026 ‡ National team caps and goals as of 18 November 2025

Fedor Ivanovič Černych (Russian: Фёдор Иванович Черных; born 21 May 1991) is a professional footballer who plays as a forward, attacking midfielder or winger for A Lyga club Kauno Žalgiris. Born in Russia, he plays for and captains the Lithuania national team. With 103 caps, he is Lithuania's most capped player.

== Club career ==
Černych was born in Moscow into a Russian family of Lithuanian descent. When his parents broke up, he went to live in Vilnius, Lithuania with his maternal grandparents.

He started his career at Granitas Vilnius, which then played in the LFF II league, South zone. In 2009, Černych signed a contract with Dnepr Mogilev.

Černych was loaned in 2012 to Naftan Novopolotsk when Dnepr Mogilev was relegated to the lower league.

In 2014, he signed for Polish club Górnik Łęczna. In an interview, he said that in Poland most of training was devoted to fitness.

On 26 January 2018, he signed with the Russian Premier League club Dynamo Moscow. On 31 March 2018, he scored his first goal for Dynamo, securing a 2–1 victory over Arsenal Tula. On 21 October 2018, he scored the only goal of the game to help Dynamo defeat Zenit Saint Petersburg, which was leading the league at the time.

On 21 August 2019, Fedor was loaned to FC Orenburg. On 8 September 2020, his contract with Dynamo Moscow was dissolved by mutual consent. On 17 September 2020, he returned to former club Jagiellonia Białystok.

On 8 January 2023, Cypriot side AEL Limassol announced reaching an agreement in principle to sign Černych until June 2024, with an option for another year, with the move to be finalized following a medical examination.

On 10 January 2024, Indian Super League club Kerala Blasters announced the signing of Černych, subject to a medical. In June 2024, he signed for Kauno Žalgiris.

== International career ==
Černych made his debut for Lithuania on 14 November 2012 in a friendly match against Armenia. A year later, on 11 October 2013, he scored his first international goal in a 2–0 victory over Latvia during the 2014 FIFA World Cup qualification.

On 7 June 2025, Černych made his 100th international appearance in a 0–0 draw against Malta during the 2026 FIFA World Cup qualification. Later that year, on 12 October, he matched Saulius Mikoliūnas' record as the most-capped Lithuanian player, earning his 101st appearance in a match against Poland during the same qualification campaign. A month later, on 13 November, he earned his 102nd cap, becoming Lithuania's all-time most-capped player in a goalless draw during a friendly match against Israel.

== Career statistics ==
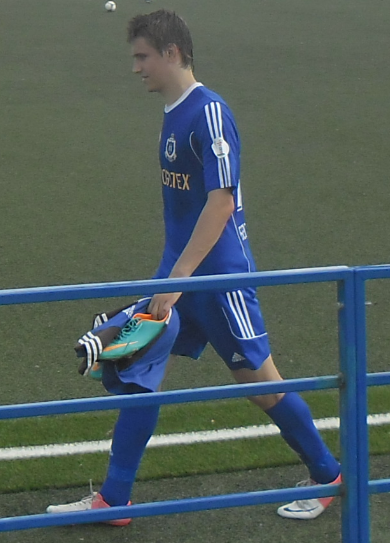
Černych at Dnepr Mogilev, 2013

=== Club ===
As of 14 April 2018

Appearances and goals by club, season and competition
Club	Season	League			National cup (Note: Includes Belarusian Cup, Polish Cup, Russian Cup)		Continental		Total	
Club	Season	Division	Apps	Goals	Apps	Goals	Apps	Goals	Apps	Goals
Dnepr Mogilev	2009	Belarusian Premier League	2	2	0	0	—		2	2
Dnepr Mogilev	2010	Belarusian Premier League	23	4	1	0	—		24	4
Dnepr Mogilev	2011	Belarusian Premier League	18	1	0	0	6 (Note: Appearances in UEFA Europa League)	1	24	2
Dnepr Mogilev	2013	Belarusian Premier League	32	4	0	0	—		32	4
Dnepr Mogilev	2014	Belarusian Premier League	10	3	4	0	—		14	3
Dnepr Mogilev	Total		85	14	5	0	6	1	96	15
Naftan (loan)	2012	Belarusian Premier League	30	5	2	1	2	0	34	6
Górnik Łęczna	2014–15	Ekstraklasa	32	11	1	1	—		33	12
Górnik Łęczna	2015–16	Ekstraklasa	6	1	1	0	—		7	1
Górnik Łęczna	Total		38	12	2	1	0	0	40	13
Jagiellonia	2015–16	Ekstraklasa	27	3	1	0	—		28	3
Jagiellonia	2016–17	Ekstraklasa	34	12	2	1	—		36	13
Jagiellonia	2017–18	Ekstraklasa	21	3	1	0	4	1	26	4
Jagiellonia	Total		82	18	4	1	4	1	90	20
Dynamo Moscow	2017–18	Russian Premier League	9	1	0	0	—		9	1
Dynamo Moscow	2018–19	Russian Premier League	22	2	2	0	—		24	2
Orenburg (loan)	2019–20	Russian Premier League	11	0	1	0	—		12	0
Jagiellonia Białystok	2020–21	Ekstraklasa	16	1	0	0	—		16	1
Career total			292	53	16	3	12	2	320	58

=== International ===
As of match played 17 November 2025

Appearances and goals by national team and year
National team	Year	Apps	Goals
Lithuania	2012	1	0
Lithuania	2013	4	1
Lithuania	2014	10	0
Lithuania	2015	6	2
Lithuania	2016	9	5
Lithuania	2017	7	0
Lithuania	2018	11	0
Lithuania	2019	7	1
Lithuania	2020	4	0
Lithuania	2021	12	2
Lithuania	2022	9	1
Lithuania	2023	9	2
Lithuania	2024	8	1
Lithuania	2025	6	0
Total		103	15

As of match played 26 March 2024

Scores and results list Lithuania's goal tally first, score column indicates score after each Černych goal.

List of international goals scored by Fedor Černych
No.	Date	Venue	Cap	Opponent	Score	Result	Competition
1	11 October 2013	LFF Stadium, Vilnius, Lithuania	3	Latvia	1–0	2–0	2014 FIFA World Cup qualification
2	14 June 2015	LFF Stadium, Vilnius, Lithuania	17	Switzerland	1–0	1–2	UEFA Euro 2016 qualification
3	8 September 2015	LFF Stadium, Vilnius, Lithuania	19	San Marino	1–0	2–1	UEFA Euro 2016 qualification
4	29 May 2016	Klaipėda Central Stadium, Klaipėda, Lithuania	24	Estonia	2–0	2–0	2016 Baltic Cup
5	1 June 2016	Daugava Stadium, Liepāja, Latvia	25	Latvia	1–2	1–2	2016 Baltic Cup
6	4 September 2016	LFF Stadium, Vilnius, Lithuania	27	Slovenia	1–0	2–2	2018 FIFA World Cup qualification
7	8 October 2016	Hampden Park, Glasgow, Scotland	28	Scotland	1–0	1–1	2018 FIFA World Cup qualification
8	11 October 2016	LFF Stadium, Vilnius, Lithuania	29	Malta	1–0	2–0	2018 FIFA World Cup qualification
9	22 March 2019	Stade Josy Barthel, Luxembourg, Luxembourg	49	Luxembourg	1–0	1–2	UEFA Euro 2020 qualification
10	9 October 2021	LFF Stadium, Vilnius, Lithuania	68	Bulgaria	2–1	3–1	2022 World Cup qualification
11	9 October 2021	LFF Stadium, Vilnius, Lithuania	68	Bulgaria	3–1	3–1	2022 World Cup qualification
12	11 June 2022	Tórsvøllur, Tórshavn, Faroe Islands	75	Faroe Islands	0–1	2–1	2022–23 UEFA Nations League
13	8 September 2023	Darius and Girėnas Stadium, Kaunas, Lithuania	84	Montenegro	2–2	2–2	UEFA Euro 2024 qualifying
14	17 October 2023	Darius and Girėnas Stadium, Kaunas, Lithuania	87	Hungary	1–0	2–2	UEFA Euro 2024 qualifying
15	26 March 2024	Darius and Girėnas Stadium, Kaunas, Lithuania	91	Gibraltar	1–0	1–0	2022–23 UEFA Nations League relegation play-outs

== Honours ==
Naftan Novopolotsk

- Belarusian Cup: 2011–12

Kauno Žalgiris

- Toplyga: 2025, 2026
- Lithuanian Cup: 2026
- Lithuanian Supercup: 2026

Individual

- Lithuanian Footballer of the Year: 2016, 2017

== See also ==
- List of men's footballers with 100 or more international caps
