= 2014–15 Ekstraklasa =

89th season of top-tier football league in Poland

Ekstraklasa
- Season: 2014–15
- Champions: Lech Poznań (7th title)
- Relegated: Zawisza Bydgoszcz; GKS Bełchatów
- Champions League: Lech Poznań
- Europa League: Legia Warsaw; Jagiellonia Białystok; Śląsk Wrocław
- Matches: 296
- Goals: 790 (2.67 per match)
- Top goalscorer: Kamil Wilczek (20 goals)
- Biggest home win: Legia 5–0 Górnik Ł. Lech 5–0 Bełchatów; Jagiellonia 5–0 Pogoń
- Biggest away win: Górnik Z. 0–5 Wisła; Górnik Z. 1–6 Lech
- Highest scoring: Piast 6–3 Bełchatów
- Longest winning run: 6 matches Zawisza Bydgoszcz
- Longest unbeaten run: 9 matches Cracovia
- Longest winless run: 11 matches GKS Bełchatów
- Longest losing run: 8 matches Zawisza Bydgoszcz
- Highest attendance: 41,556; Lech 0–0 Wisła (7 June 2015)
- Lowest attendance: 0 Lech 4–0 Piast (20 July 2014)
- Total attendance: 2,464,255
- Average attendance: 8,325 ▼0.2%

The 2014–15 Ekstraklasa (also known as T-Mobile Ekstraklasa due to its sponsorship by T-Mobile Polska) was the 81st season of the highest level of football leagues in the Polish football league system since its establishment in 1927. It began on 18 July 2014. A total of 16 teams are participating, 14 of which competed in the league during the 2013–14 season, while the remaining two were promoted from the I Liga. Each team played a total of 30 matches, half at home and half away.

Legia Warsaw were the defending champions, having won their 10th title last season, but Lech Poznań won their 7th title.

== Teams ==
Promotion and relegation as usual was determined by the position in the table from prior season. The bottom two teams were directly relegated to the I Liga, while the top two teams are promoted to the Ekstraklasa.

Widzew Łódź and Zagłębie Lubin finished in 15th and 16th place, respectively, and were relegated to the Polish First League as a result. GKS Bełchatów and Górnik Łęczna finished 1st and 2nd, respectively, in the I Liga gained promotion.

=== Stadium and locations ===
Location of teams in 2014–15 Ekstraklasa
Location of teams in the Katowice urban area

Team	Location	Venue	Capacity
Cracovia	Kraków	Stadion im. Józefa Piłsudskiego	14,572
GKS Bełchatów	Bełchatów	GIEKSA Arena	5,238
Górnik Łęczna	Łęczna	Stadion Górnika Łęczna	7,500
Górnik Zabrze	Zabrze	Stadion im. Ernesta Pohla	3,041
Jagiellonia Białystok	Białystok	Stadion Jagiellonii	22,386
Korona Kielce	Kielce	Kolporter Arena	15,550
Lech Poznań	Poznań	INEA Stadion	41,609
Lechia Gdańsk	Gdańsk	PGE Arena Gdańsk	43,165
Legia Warsaw	Warsaw	Pepsi Arena	31,103
Piast Gliwice	Gliwice	Arena Gliwice	10,037
Podbeskidzie Bielsko-Biała	Bielsko-Biała	Stadion BBOSiR	6,962
Pogoń Szczecin	Szczecin	Stadion im. Floriana Krygiera	15,717
Ruch Chorzów	Chorzów	Stadion Ruchu Chorzów	10,000
Wisła Kraków	Kraków	Stadion im. Henryka Reymana	33,326
Zawisza Bydgoszcz	Bydgoszcz	Stadion im. Zdzisława Krzyszkowiaka	20,247
Śląsk Wrocław	Wrocław	Stadion Wrocław	42,771

Cracovia	GKS Bełchatów	Górnik Łęczna	Górnik Zabrze	Jagiellonia	Korona
Stadion im. Marszałka Józefa Piłsudskiego	GIEKSA Arena	Stadion Górnika Łęczna	Stadion im. Ernesta Pohla	Stadion Jagiellonii	Kolporter Arena
Capacity: 14,572	Capacity: 5,238	Capacity: 7,500	Capacity: 3,041	Capacity: 22,386	Capacity: 15,500
Lech	Lechia	Legia	Piast	Podbeskidzie	Pogoń
INEA Stadion	PGE Arena Gdańsk	Pepsi Arena	Arena Gliwice	Stadion BBOSiR	Stadion im. Floriana Krygiera
Capacity: 43,269	Capacity: 43,615	Capacity: 31,103	Capacity: 10,037	Capacity: 6,962	Capacity: 18,027
	Ruch	Śląsk	Wisła	Zawisza	
	Stadion Ruchu Chorzów	Stadion Wrocław	Stadion im. Henryka Reymana	Stadion im. Zdzisława Krzyszkowiaka	
	Capacity: 10,000	Capacity: 42,771	Capacity: 33,268	Capacity: 20,247	

=== Personnel and kits ===
Team	Chairman	Head coach	Captain	Manufacturer	Sponsors
Cracovia	(Poland) Janusz Filipiak	(Poland) Jacek Zieliński	(Poland) Krzysztof Pilarz	Legea	Comarch
GKS Bełchatów	(Poland) Marcin Szymczyk	(Poland) Kamil Kiereś	(Poland) Paweł Baranowski	adidas	PGE
Górnik Łęczna	(Poland) Artur Kapelko	(Russia) (Poland) Yuriy Shatalov	(Serbia) Veljko Nikitović	Jako	Lubelski Węgiel Bogdanka
Górnik Zabrze	(Poland) Zbigniew Waśkiewicz	(Poland) Józef Dankowski	(Poland) Adam Danch	adidas	Kompania Węglowa, Allianz
Jagiellonia Białystok	(Poland) Cezary Kulesza	(Poland) Michał Probierz	(Poland) Rafał Grzyb	Errea	Wschodzący Białystok
Korona Kielce	(Poland) Marek Paprocki	(Poland) Ryszard Tarasiewicz	(Poland) Paweł Golański	hummel	Lewiatan
Lech Poznań	(Poland) Karol Klimczak	(Poland) Maciej Skorża	(Poland) Łukasz Trałka	Nike	STS
Lechia Gdańsk	(Poland) Adam Mandziara	(Poland) Jerzy Brzęczek	(Poland) Sebastian Mila	Saller	Lotos
Legia Warsaw	(Poland) Bogusław Leśnodorski	(Norway) Henning Berg	(Croatia) Ivica Vrdoljak	adidas	Fortuna
Piast Gliwice	(Poland) Adam Sarkowicz	(Czech Republic) Radoslav Látal	(Poland) Tomasz Podgórski	adidas	Miasto Gliwice
Podbeskidzie Bielsko-Biała	(Poland) Wojciech Borecki	(Poland) Dariusz Kubicki	(Poland) Marek Sokołowski	Masita	murapol.pl, Kredyty Chwilówki
Pogoń Szczecin	(Poland) Jarosław Mroczek	(Poland) Czesław Michniewicz	(Poland) Rafał Murawski	Nike	Grupa Azoty, Miasto Szczecin
Ruch Chorzów	(Poland) Dariusz Smagorowicz	(Poland) Waldemar Fornalik	(Poland) Marcin Malinowski	adidas	Węglokoks
Śląsk Wrocław	(Poland) Paweł Żelem	(Poland) Tadeusz Pawłowski	(Poland) Mariusz Pawełek	adidas	
Wisła Kraków	(Poland) Robert Gaszyński	(Poland) Kazimierz Moskal	(Poland) Arkadiusz Głowacki	adidas	TeleFonika
Zawisza Bydgoszcz	(Poland) Anita Osuch	(Poland) Mariusz Rumak	(Poland) Jakub Wójcicki	Masita	Solbet

== League table ==
Pos	Team	Pld	W	D	L	GF	GA	GD	Pts	Qualification or relegation
1	Legia Warsaw	30	17	5	8	57	30	+27	56	Qualification to Championship round
2	Lech Poznań	30	14	12	4	52	27	+25	54	Qualification to Championship round
3	Jagiellonia Białystok	30	14	7	9	43	35	+8	49	Qualification to Championship round
4	Śląsk Wrocław	30	12	10	8	43	36	+7	46	Qualification to Championship round
5	Wisła Kraków	30	11	10	9	47	39	+8	43 (Note: Wisła Kraków ahead on head-to-head record; Górnik Zabrze – Wisła Kraków 0–5, Wisła Kraków – Górnik Zabrze 1–1)	Qualification to Championship round
6	Górnik Zabrze	30	11	10	9	43	43	0	43	Qualification to Championship round
7	Pogoń Szczecin	30	11	8	11	40	38	+2	41 (Note: Tied on head-to-head record, Pogoń Szczecin ahead on goal difference; Lechia Gdańsk – Pogoń Szczecin 0–1, Pogoń Szczecin – Lechia Gdańsk 0–1)	Qualification to Championship round
8	Lechia Gdańsk	30	11	8	11	36	37	−1	41	Qualification to Championship round
9	Korona Kielce	30	10	9	11	34	42	−8	39 (Note: Head-to-head record; Korona Kielce 10 pts, Piast Gliwice 6 pts, Podbeskidzie Bielsko-Biała 1 pt)	Qualification to Relegation round
10	Piast Gliwice	30	11	6	13	38	43	−5	39	Qualification to Relegation round
11	Podbeskidzie Bielsko-Biała	30	10	9	11	40	48	−8	39	Qualification to Relegation round
12	Cracovia	30	10	7	13	35	41	−6	37	Qualification to Relegation round
13	Górnik Łęczna	30	8	10	12	31	37	−6	34	Qualification to Relegation round
14	Ruch Chorzów	30	8	9	13	33	38	−5	33	Qualification to Relegation round
15	GKS Bełchatów	30	8	7	15	24	42	−18	31	Qualification to Relegation round
16	Zawisza Bydgoszcz	30	8	5	17	32	52	−20	29	Qualification to Relegation round

Source: Ekstraklasa
Rules for classification: 1) points; 2) head-to-head points; 3) head-to-head goal difference; 4) head-to-head goals scored; 5) goal difference; 6) number of goals scored; 7) Fair play table; head-to-head record is used only after all the matches between the teams in question have been played.

=== Positions by round ===
Team ╲ Round	1	2	3	4	5	6	7	8	9	10	11	12	13	14	15	16	17	18	19	20	21	22	23	24	25	26	27	28	29	30
Legia	12	8	10	4	3	2	3	2	1	1	2	1	1	1	1	1	1	1	1	1	1	1	1	1	1	1	1	1	1	1
Lech	1	3	9	5	6	8	9	10	7	7	7	7	6	6	7	7	6	3	3	4	3	3	2	3	2	2	2	2	2	2
Jagiellonia	7	4	2	7	11	11	10	7	6	6	3	2	2	3	3	5	5	5	5	3	2	2	3	2	3	3	3	3	3	3
Śląsk	2	10	5	10	10	7	5	6	5	3	3	3	3	2	2	3	3	2	2	2	4	4	4	4	4	4	4	4	5	4
Wisła	9	11	7	9	5	3	1	1	2	5	6	4	4	5	5	2	2	4	4	5	5	5	6	6	5	5	5	5	4	5
Górnik Z.	2	5	6	2	1	1	2	3	3	4	1	5	7	7	6	4	4	6	6	7	6	6	5	5	8	7	8	6	8	6
Pogoń	5	1	1	3	4	9	11	9	9	10	8	10	8	8	8	8	8	7	7	8	9	10	12	12	10	11	9	8	6	7
Lechia	7	6	3	6	9	6	7	8	10	8	8	9	10	10	12	11	13	11	13	12	11	12	11	8	7	8	6	9	7	8
Korona	13	16	13	15	16	16	16	15	15	15	15	15	14	14	14	13	11	13	14	14	14	13	13	14	11	9	10	10	10	9
Piast	16	12	14	14	15	15	12	12	11	11	10	12	12	9	9	9	10	10	10	10	8	9	9	10	12	13	12	12	11	10
Podbeskidzie	11	13	11	8	8	5	4	4	8	9	12	8	9	11	10	10	9	9	8	6	7	7	7	7	6	6	7	7	9	11
Cracovia	13	15	15	13	12	13	14	13	13	13	13	13	13	12	11	12	14	14	12	13	13	14	14	13	14	12	14	14	13	12
Górnik Ł.	9	6	8	11	7	10	8	9	12	12	11	11	11	13	13	14	12	12	11	11	12	11	8	9	9	10	11	11	12	13
Ruch	13	14	16	16	13	12	13	14	14	14	14	14	15	15	15	15	15	15	15	15	15	15	15	15	15	15	13	13	14	14
GKS Bełchatów	6	2	4	1	2	4	6	5	4	2	5	6	5	4	4	6	7	8	9	9	10	8	10	11	13	14	15	15	15	15
Zawisza	2	9	12	12	14	14	15	16	16	16	16	16	16	16	16	16	16	16	16	16	16	16	16	16	16	16	16	16	16	16

== Results ==
Home \ Away	CRA	BEŁ	GKŁ	GÓR	JAG	KOR	LGD	LPO	LEG	PIA	PBB	POG	RUC	ŚLĄ	WIS	ZAW
Cracovia		3–1	2–1	1–2	1–1	2–1	3–2	0–0	1–3	3–1	1–3	0–1	1–0	1–1	1–0	1–0
GKS Bełchatów	1–1		1–1	1–0	0–0	2–0	1–1	1–2	0–3	0–0	1–2	1–0	0–1	2–0	3–1	1–4
Górnik Łęczna	2–1	1–1		0–1	0–0	1–0	1–1	1–1	3–1	1–2	0–0	4–2	3–0	1–1	1–1	5–2
Górnik Zabrze	2–0	2–0	2–0		3–0	1–1	2–2	1–1	0–4	1–2	3–3	1–1	2–2	3–3	0–5	2–1
Jagiellonia Białystok	2–1	0–1	2–1	1–0		1–2	2–2	1–0	0–3	2–1	4–2	5–0	2–0	1–3	2–2	0–0
Korona Kielce	1–2	2–0	2–0	0–3	0–3		3–2	2–2	0–0	1–0	2–1	2–2	0–0	2–2	3–2	2–2
Lechia Gdańsk	1–0	1–0	2–0	1–0	1–1	1–2		1–2	1–0	3–1	1–0	0–1	3–3	1–4	1–0	0–0
Lech Poznań	1–1	5–0	1–0	3–0	2–0	1–1	1–0		2–1	4–0	1–1	1–1	2–1	2–0	2–3	6–2
Legia Warsaw	2–0	0–1	5–0	1–1	1–3	2–0	1–0	2–2		2–0	3–0	2–1	2–1	4–3	2–2	2–0
Piast Gliwice	4–2	3–1	0–0	2–2	0–2	1–2	1–3	3–2	3–1		3–0	1–0	0–1	2–0	0–0	3–0
Podbeskidzie Bielsko-Biała	1–1	1–1	1–0	0–3	1–0	2–2	1–0	0–2	2–1	2–4		2–3	3–0	2–2	2–2	2–1
Pogoń Szczecin	2–1	3–0	0–1	3–1	2–0	2–0	0–1	1–1	2–1	0–0	1–2		1–1	4–1	0–3	3–0
Ruch Chorzów	3–0	0–1	1–2	1–2	5–2	0–1	1–1	0–0	0–0	2–0	2–0	2–1		1–0	1–2	1–2
Śląsk Wrocław	0–0	2–1	2–1	2–0	0–1	1–0	3–0	1–1	1–3	3–0	0–0	1–1	2–0		1–0	2–1
Wisła Kraków	2–1	1–0	2–0	1–1	0–2	2–0	3–1	1–2	0–3	1–1	3–2	1–1	2–2	1–1		0–1
Zawisza Bydgoszcz	0–3	2–1	0–0	1–2	1–3	2–0	0–2	1–0	1–2	2–0	1–2	2–1	1–1	0–1	2–4	

Source: 90minut.pl
Legend: Blue = home team win; Yellow = draw; Red = away team win.

== Play-offs ==
=== Championship round ===
==== League table ====
Pos	Team	Pld	W	D	L	GF	GA	GD	Pts	Qualification
1	Lech Poznań (C)	37	19	13	5	67	33	+34	43	Qualification to Champions League second qualifying round
2	Legia Warsaw	37	21	7	9	64	33	+31	42	Qualification to Europa League second qualifying round (Note: Legia Warsaw qualifies for Europa League second qualifying round as winners of the 2014–15 Polish Cup and the spot for the runners-up (Europa League first qualifying round) is passed to the fourth placed team.)
3	Jagiellonia Białystok	37	19	8	10	59	44	+15	41	Qualification to Europa League first qualifying round
4	Śląsk Wrocław	37	15	13	9	50	43	+7	35	Qualification to Europa League first qualifying round
5	Lechia Gdańsk	37	13	10	14	45	47	−2	29	
6	Wisła Kraków	37	12	13	12	56	48	+8	28	
7	Górnik Zabrze	37	12	11	14	50	60	−10	26	
8	Pogoń Szczecin	37	11	9	17	45	52	−7	22	

Source: Ekstraklasa
Rules for classification: 1) points; 2) points in regular season; 3) head-to-head points in regular season; 4) head-to-head goal difference in regular season; 5) head-to-head away goals scored in regular season (if only two teams); 6) head-to-head goals scored in regular season (if more than two teams); 7) goal difference; 8) number of goals scored; 9) Fair Play table.
(C) Champions

==== Positions by round ====
Team ╲ Round	30	31	32	33	34	35	36	37
Lech	2	1	1	1	1	1	1	1
Legia	1	2	2	2	2	2	2	2
Jagiellonia	3	3	3	3	3	3	3	3
Śląsk	4	5	5	6	6	4	4	4
Lechia	8	6	7	4	4	5	5	5
Wisła	5	4	4	5	5	6	6	6
Górnik Z.	6	7	6	7	7	7	7	7
Pogoń	7	8	8	8	8	8	8	8

==== Results ====
Home \ Away	LEG	LPO	JAG	ŚLĄ	WIS	GÓR	POG	LGD
Legia Warsaw		1–2	1–0		1–0	2–0		
Lech Poznań			1–3	3–0	0–0		1–0	
Jagiellonia Białystok				1–1	2–1	3–2		4–2
Śląsk Wrocław	1–1					1–1	2–1	1–0
Wisła Kraków				0–1		4–1	2–2	
Górnik Zabrze		1–6					2–0	0–1
Pogoń Szczecin	0–1		1–3					1–3
Lechia Gdańsk	0–0	1–2			2–2			

Source: 90minut.pl
Legend: Blue = home team win; Yellow = draw; Red = away team win.

=== Relegation round ===
==== League table ====
Pos	Team	Pld	W	D	L	GF	GA	GD	Pts	Relegation
9	Cracovia	37	15	9	13	50	44	+6	36	
10	Ruch Chorzów	37	12	10	15	44	46	−2	30	
11	Korona Kielce	37	12	11	14	44	55	−11	28	
12	Piast Gliwice	37	13	8	16	50	56	−6	28	
13	Podbeskidzie Bielsko-Biała	37	12	10	15	47	60	−13	27	
14	Górnik Łęczna	37	11	11	15	39	46	−7	27	
15	Zawisza Bydgoszcz (R)	37	10	8	19	45	63	−18	24	Relegation to I liga
16	GKS Bełchatów (R)	37	9	9	19	35	60	−25	21	Relegation to I liga

Source: Ekstraklasa
Rules for classification: 1) points; 2) points in regular season; 3) head-to-head points in regular season; 4) head-to-head goal difference in regular season; 5) head-to-head away goals scored in regular season (if only two teams); 6) head-to-head goals scored in regular season (if more than two teams); 7) goal difference; 8) number of goals scored; 9) Fair Play table.
(R) Relegated

==== Positions by round ====
Team ╲ Round	30	31	32	33	34	35	36	37
Cracovia	12	12	10	9	10	9	9	9
Ruch	14	14	12	12	13	11	12	10
Korona	9	10	13	14	14	12	13	11
Piast	10	11	11	10	9	10	10	12
Podbeskidzie	11	9	9	11	11	13	11	13
Górnik Ł.	13	13	14	13	12	14	14	14
Zawisza	16	16	15	15	16	15	15	15
GKS Bełchatów	15	15	16	16	15	16	16	16

==== Results ====
Home \ Away	KOR	PIA	PBB	CRA	GKŁ	RUC	BEŁ	ZAW
Korona Kielce		2–1	3–1		1–3	0–2		
Piast Gliwice			2–1	0–3	2–3		6–3	
Podbeskidzie Bielsko-Biała				0–3	1–0	0–2		2–2
Cracovia	1–1					1–0	1–1	3–1
Górnik Łęczna				0–3		0–1	1–0	
Ruch Chorzów		1–1					2–4	3–2
GKS Bełchatów	2–2		0–2					1–4
Zawisza Bydgoszcz	3–1	0–0			1–1			

Source: 90minut.pl
Legend: Blue = home team win; Yellow = draw; Red = away team win.

== Season statistics ==
=== Top goalscorers ===
As of matches played 7 June 2015.

Rank	Player	Club	Goals
1	(Poland) Kamil Wilczek	Piast Gliwice	20
2	(Portugal) Flávio Paixão	Śląsk Wrocław	18
3	(Poland) Paweł Brożek	Wisła Kraków	15
3	(Poland) Patryk Tuszyński	Jagiellonia Białystok	15
5	(Poland) Grzegorz Kuświk	Ruch Chorzów	14
5	(Poland) Mateusz Piątkowski	Jagiellonia Białystok	14
7	(Finland) Kasper Hämäläinen	Lech Poznań	13
7	(Portugal) Orlando Sá	Legia Warsaw	13
9	(Poland) Łukasz Zwoliński	Pogoń Szczecin	12
10	(Lithuania) Fiodor Černych	Górnik Łęczna	11
10	(Poland) Arkadiusz Piech	GKS Bełchatów	11
10	(Latvia) Deniss Rakels	Cracovia	11
10	(Poland) Marcin Robak	Pogoń Szczecin	11

== Awards ==
=== Monthly awards ===
==== Player of the Month ====
Month	Player	Club
August 2014	(Bosnia and Herzegovina) Semir Štilić	Wisła Kraków
September 2014	(Poland) Mateusz Piątkowski	Jagiellonia Białystok
October 2014	(Portugal) Flávio Paixão	Śląsk Wrocław
November 2014	(Poland) Kamil Wilczek	Piast Gliwice
March 2015	(Poland) Grzegorz Sandomierski	Zawisza Bydgoszcz
April 2015	(Poland) Łukasz Zwoliński	Pogoń Szczecin
May 2015	(Poland) Kamil Wilczek	Piast Gliwice

=== Annual awards ===
Award	Player	Club
Player of the Season	(Poland) Kamil Wilczek	Piast Gliwice
Goalkeeper of the Season	(Poland) Bartłomiej Drągowski	Jagiellonia Białystok
Defender of the Season	(Poland) Michał Pazdan	Jagiellonia Białystok
Midfielder of the Season	(Bosnia and Herzegovina) Semir Štilić	Wisła Kraków
Forward of the Season	(Poland) Kamil Wilczek	Piast Gliwice
Coach of the Season	(Poland) Michał Probierz	Jagiellonia Białystok
Discovery of the Season	(Poland) Bartłomiej Drągowski	Jagiellonia Białystok
Plus of the Season	(Poland) Szymon Pawłowski	Lech Poznań

== Attendances ==
No.	Club	Average	Highest
1	Lech Poznań	18,999	41,556
2	Legia Warszawa	16,614	26,527
3	Lechia Gdańsk	16,608	36,500
4	Wisła Kraków	12,224	31,289
5	Śląsk Wrocław	10,963	22,687
6	Jagiellonia Białystok	10,750	21,196
7	Cracovia	6,673	14,114
8	Korona Kielce	6,286	11,006
9	Pogoń Szczecin	6,107	9,684
10	Ruch Chorzów	5,678	9,284
11	Piast Gliwice	4,593	8,102
12	Górnik Łęczna	4,303	7,000
13	Podbeskidzie Bielsko-Biala	3,901	6,188
14	Bełchatów	3,050	4,765
15	Górnik Zabrze	2,961	3,000
16	Zawisza Bydgoszcz	2,809	4,893
