= Patrycja Balcerzak =

Polish former footballer and sports executive (born 1994)

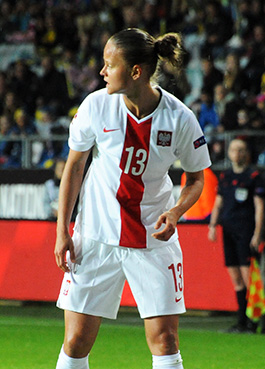
- Balcerzak with Poland in 2015

Personal information
- Date of birth: 1 January 1994 (age 32)
- Place of birth: Sieradz, Poland
- Position: Midfielder

Youth career
- Warta Sieradz
- Ostrovia Ostrówek

Senior career*
Years	Team	Apps	(Gls)
2010–2012	Pogoń Szczecin		
2012–2018	Medyk Konin		
2018–2019	Górnik Łęczna	27	(1)
2019–2022	SC Sand	46	(1)
2022–2023	Sporting de Huelva	24	(2)
2023–2026	UKS SMS Łódź	48	(8)

International career
2010–2011	Poland U17	6	(4)
2011–2012	Poland U19	11	(4)
2011–2021	Poland	78	(15)
- * Club domestic league appearances and goals

Patrycja Balcerzak (born 1 January 1994) is a Polish football coach, executive and former professional player who played as a midfielder. She made 78 appearances for the Poland national team between 2011 and 2021, scoring 15 goals.

During her club career she played in Poland, Germany and Spain, winning four Polish league titles and five Polish Cups with Medyk Konin. After ending her playing career in February 2026, she became sporting director of the women's department at Widzew Łódź. In September 2026, she was appointed director of the Municipal Sports and Recreation Centre (MOSiR) in her hometown of Sieradz.

== Club career ==
Balcerzak began playing football in and around her hometown of Sieradz, representing Warta Sieradz and Ostrovia Ostrówek at youth level.

In 2010, she joined Pogoń Szczecin, where she began her senior career. In 2012, she moved to Medyk Konin. During six seasons with the club, she won four consecutive Ekstraliga titles between 2013–14 and 2016–17 and five consecutive Polish Cups from 2012–13 to 2016–17. She also represented Medyk in the UEFA Women's Champions League.

In 2018, Balcerzak joined Górnik Łęczna. She won another Polish championship in the 2018–19 season before moving abroad.

From 2019 to 2022, she played for German Frauen-Bundesliga club SC Sand, making 46 league appearances and scoring once. In 2022, she moved to Spain to join Sporting de Huelva in Liga F, where she made 24 league appearances and scored two goals.

In July 2023, Balcerzak returned to Poland and signed for UKS SMS Łódź. She combined her playing duties with a coaching role as an assistant coach of the first team. She left the club by mutual consent on 18 February 2026 and announced the end of her professional playing career. Across all competitions, she made 58 appearances and scored 11 goals for the Łódź club.

== International career ==
Balcerzak represented Poland at under-17 and under-19 level before breaking into the senior national team while still a teenager.

She made her senior international debut on 22 October 2011 in a 2–0 victory over Greece. She was 17 years and 294 days old at the time.

Over the following decade, Balcerzak became a regular member of the Poland squad and took part in several qualification campaigns for the UEFA Women's Championship and FIFA Women's World Cup. Primarily a midfielder, she was also used in defensive positions and became known for her versatility.

On 21 August 2014, she started Poland's World Cup qualifying match against Sweden. The starting XI had an average age of 21.27 years, the youngest Poland starting line-up in a competitive women's international at that time.

Balcerzak's final appearance for Poland came on 14 June 2021 in a 5–0 friendly victory over the Czech Republic in Cartagena, Spain. She started the match and was substituted in the 75th minute.

She finished her senior international career with 78 caps and 15 goals.

In October 2026, the Polish Football Association announced that Balcerzak and former international Aleksandra Rompa would be officially honoured for their contributions to the national team before Poland's match against Belgium at the Polsat Plus Arena Gdańsk on 13 October 2026.

== Coaching and executive career ==
While playing for UKS SMS Łódź, Balcerzak also worked as an assistant coach of the club's first team. She holds a UEFA A coaching licence.

Following her retirement from professional football in February 2026, she was appointed sporting director of the women's football department at Widzew Łódź.

Later in 2026 she left the role. In September, her application for the position of director of the Municipal Sports and Recreation Centre in Sieradz was ranked highest in the city's recruitment process. She took up the position on 14 September 2026.

== Other activities ==
Balcerzak has worked in the media as a football pundit and commentator, particularly covering women's football.

In 2022, she established the youth football tournament Balcerzak Cup in Sieradz. The competition has since become an annual event for youth teams from across Poland.

She also organises Balcerzak Camp, a football training programme for young players.

In 2026, she served as an ambassador for the 2026 FIFA U-20 Women's World Cup in Poland, representing host city Łódź.

== Career statistics ==
=== International ===
Appearances and goals by national team and year
National team	Year	Apps	Goals
Poland	2011	3	0
Poland	2012	6	1
Poland	2013	6	1
Poland	2014	13	5
Poland	2015	10	3
Poland	2016	10	0
Poland	2017	8	3
Poland	2018	7	0
Poland	2019	9	2
Poland	2020	5	0
Poland	2021	1	0
Total		78	15

== Honours ==
Medyk Konin

- Ekstraliga: 2013–14, 2014–15, 2015–16, 2016–17
- Polish Cup: 2012–13, 2013–14, 2014–15, 2015–16, 2016–17

Górnik Łęczna

- Ekstraliga: 2018–19
