= Jasmina Stojanoska =

Macedonian footballer

Personal information
- Date of birth: 10 July 1987 (age 39)
- Position: Defender

Senior career*
Years	Team	Apps	(Gls)
- Lombardini Skopje
- Shkiponjat
- Tikvesanka
- Naše Taksi
- Kočani

International career^{‡}
2003–200?	North Macedonia U19	5	(0)
20??–2014	North Macedonia	4	(0)
- * Club domestic league appearances and goals ‡ National team caps and goals as of 2 March 2015

Jasmina Stojanoska (Macedonian: Јасмина Стојаноска; born 10 July 1987) is a Macedonian footballer who plays as a defender. She has been a member of the North Macedonia women's national team.
