= Kim Sundlöv =

Swedish footballer

Personal information
- Full name: Kim Sundlöv
- Date of birth: 30 August 1990 (age 36)
- Place of birth: Sweden
- Height: 1.72 m (5 ft 8 in)
- Position: Defender

Team information
- Current team: Stabæk
- Number: 15

Senior career*
Years	Team	Apps	(Gls)
2011–2013	Sundsvalls DFF	60	(2)
2014	Åland United	23	(2)
2015–2020	Djurgårdens IF	74	(2)
2020	→ Sandvikens IF (loan)	17	(1)
2021-	Stabæk	17	(0)
- * Club domestic league appearances and goals as of 7 September 2016

Kim Sundlöv (born 30 August 1990) is a Swedish football defender who currently plays for Stabæk.

== Honours ==
Åland United

- Naisten Liiga Runner-up: 2014
