= Mikołaj Kwietniewski =

Polish footballer

Mikolaj Kwietniewski
Personal information
- Date of birth: 30 April 1999 (age 27)
- Place of birth: Kielce, Poland
- Height: 1.74 m (5 ft 9 in)
- Position: Midfielder

Team information
- Current team: Korona Kielce II
- Number: 6

Youth career
- –2013: Korona Kielce
- 2013–2018: Fulham

Senior career*
Years	Team	Apps	(Gls)
2018–2021	Legia Warsaw	0	(0)
2018–2021	Legia Warsaw II	33	(4)
2019	→ Bytovia Bytów (loan)	9	(0)
2019–2020	→ Wisła Płock (loan)	12	(1)
2021–2022	Skra Częstochowa	30	(2)
2022–2023	Ruch Chorzów	18	(0)
2023–2025	Sandecja Nowy Sącz	52	(9)
2025–2026	Naprzód Jędrzejów	3	(0)
2026–	Korona Kielce II	1	(0)

International career
2014–2015	Poland U16	8	(1)
2015–2016	Poland U17	10	(2)
2017–2018	Poland U19	9	(0)
2019	Poland U20	2	(1)
- * Club domestic league appearances and goals as of 10:53, 5 June 2026 (UTC)

Mikolaj Kwietniewski (born 30 April 1999) is a Polish professional footballer who plays as a midfielder for III liga club Korona Kielce II.

== Club career ==
He started his career with English club Fulham.

== Honours ==
Sandecja Nowy Sącz

- III liga, group IV: 2024–25
- Polish Cup (Nowy Sącz regionals): 2024–25
