= Dennis Jastrzembski =

German footballer

Personal information
- Full name: Dennis Jastrzembski
- Date of birth: 20 February 2000 (age 26)
- Place of birth: Rendsburg, Germany
- Height: 1.77 m (5 ft 10 in)
- Position: Winger

Team information
- Current team: Olimpia Grudziądz
- Number: 22

Youth career
- –2013: TSV Kropp
- 2013–2015: Holstein Kiel
- 2015–2019: Hertha BSC

Senior career*
Years	Team	Apps	(Gls)
2018–	Hertha BSC II	15	(1)
2018–2022	Hertha BSC	13	(0)
2020–2021	→ SC Paderborn (loan)	9	(0)
2021	→ Waldhof Mannheim (loan)	15	(1)
2022–2023	Śląsk Wrocław	47	(3)
2023–2025	Fortuna Düsseldorf	20	(1)
2023–2024	Fortuna Düsseldorf II	2	(0)
2025–2026	Sturm Graz II	24	(3)
2026–	Olimpia Grudziądz	6	(1)

International career
2015	Poland U15	4	(1)
2015	Poland U16	4	(1)
2016	Germany U16	5	(1)
2016–2017	Germany U17	16	(4)
2018	Germany U18	1	(0)
2018–2019	Germany U19	8	(0)
2020	Poland U21	1	(0)
- * Club domestic league appearances and goals as of 09:49, 14 September 2026 (UTC)

Dennis Jastrzembski (born 20 February 2000) is a professional footballer who plays as a winger for II liga club Olimpia Grudziądz. Born in Germany, he has represented both Germany and Poland at youth level.

== Club career ==
=== Hertha ===
Jastrzembski made his professional debut for Hertha BSC on 20 August 2018, appearing in the first round of the 2018–19 DFB-Pokal against 3. Liga side Eintracht Braunschweig. He was substituted on in the 75th minute for Salomon Kalou, and assisted the winning goal by Vedad Ibišević in the 83rd minute, with the match finishing as a 2–1 away win for Hertha.

==== Loans ====
On 31 January 2020, SC Paderborn 07 announced the signing of Jastrzembski on a loan deal lasting until 2021.

On 27 January 2021, he moved to German club SV Waldhof Mannheim on a loan deal until the end of the season.

=== Śląsk Wrocław ===
On 25 January 2022, Jastrzembski moved to the country he most recently represented, Poland, signing a three-and-a-half-year deal with Ekstraklasa side Śląsk Wrocław.

=== Fortuna Düsseldorf ===
On 23 August 2023, he signed with Fortuna Düsseldorf.

=== Sturm Graz II ===
On 3 September 2025, Jastrzembski joined Sturm Graz's reserve team, playing in the Austrian second division.

=== Olimpia Grudziądz ===
On 5 August 2026, he was announced as the new signing of Polish third division club Olimpia Grudziądz.

== International career ==
Jastrzembski was capped for Poland's under-15 team in 2015, where he appeared made four appearances and scored one goal. Later that year, he was capped four times for the Poland national under-16, scoring one goal.

In 2016, Jastrzembski switched to Germany, first appearing in the under-16 team. In 2017, he was included in Germany's squad for the 2017 UEFA European Under-17 Championship in Croatia, where Germany were eliminated in the semi-finals. Later that year, he was included in Germany's squad for the 2017 FIFA U-17 World Cup in India, where Germany were eliminated in the quarter-finals.

In 2020, he switched back to Poland and was called up to the under-20 team in March that year. He made his first appearance for Poland U21 off the bench in a 2021 UEFA European Under-21 Championship qualifier against Serbia U21 on 9 October 2020.

== Personal life ==
Jastrzembski was born in Rendsburg, Schleswig-Holstein and is of Polish descent. His brother Chris is also a footballer.
