= Modranka =

City district of Trnava, Slovakia

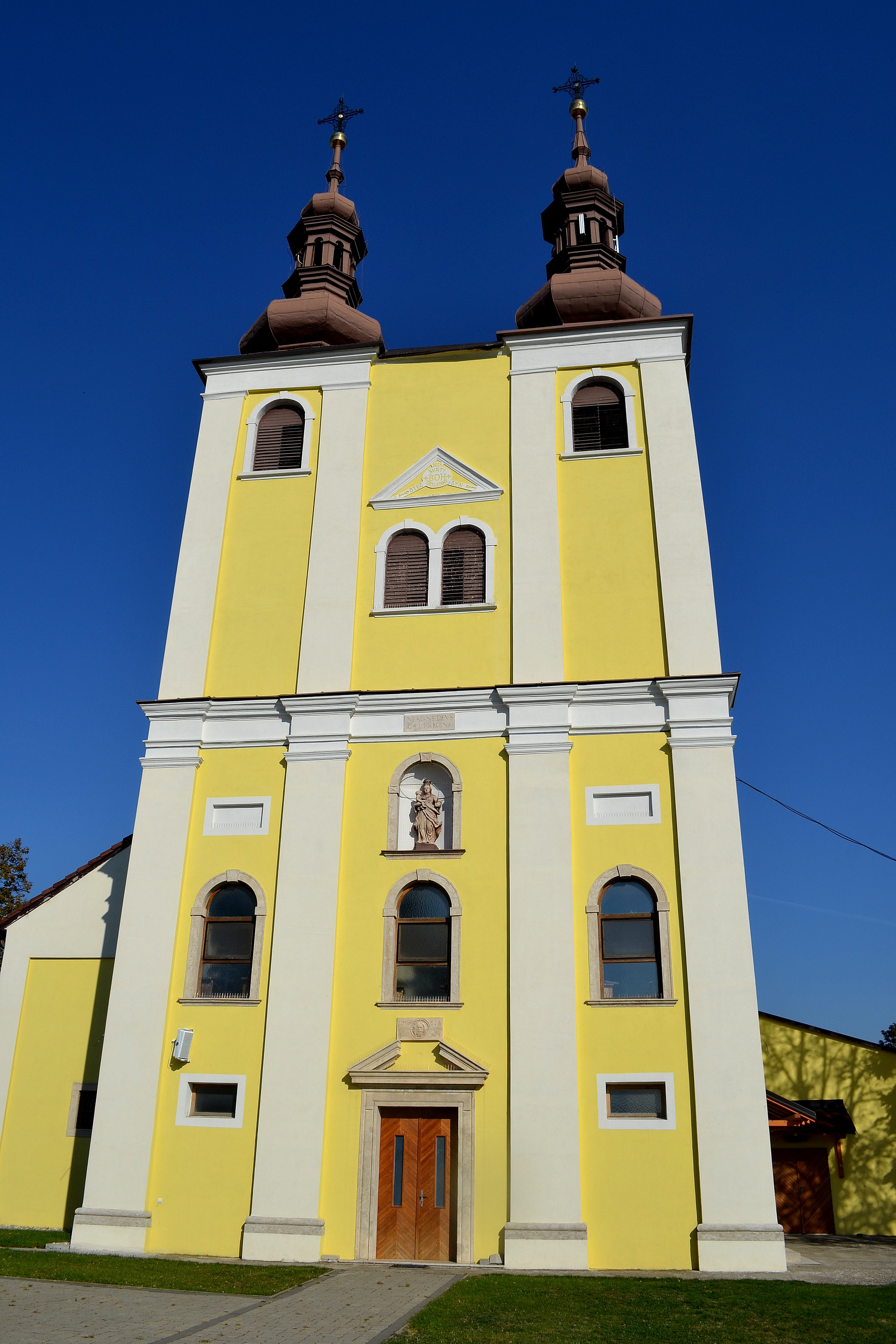
- Church of the Holy Trinity in Modranka
- Interactive map of Modranka

Modranka is a city district of Trnava with rural housing and its own cadastral territory with an area of 7.7 km^{2} (3.0 sq mi). In the Trnava city council, Modranka is represented by one member of parliament, given the number of inhabitants. It lies in the geomorphological part Trnavská tabuľa, between the left bank of the Trnávka River and the I. class road No. 51. It is the only rural city district of Trnava. The inhabitants are served by the Roman Catholic Church of the Holy Trinity from 1657, an elementary school with a kindergarten, a cultural center and a post office. There is also a chapel of St. Mary Magdalene from 1630.

== History ==
Modranka was first mentioned in writing in 1258 as Megeret. In 1273, Ladislaus IV gifted the village to the city of Trnava, and it remained part of it until 1848. Originally, Trnava's settlement extended from Modranka in the east to Smolenice in the west, serving as a key route connecting Nitra and Moravia. In the 9th and 10th centuries, it was under the control of the Árpád dynasty. Research shows the estate bordered Boleráz and included areas like Šelpice, Klčovany, and Bohdanovce, with its border zone encompassing Hrnčiaroviec nad Parnou, Modranka, and nearby villages. Modranka has been part of Trnava since the 13th century, primarily as a serf village. In 1695, Pope Innocent XII declared Modranka a pilgrimage site and granted indulgences to visitors. In 1828, it had 101 houses and 728 inhabitants, who were employed as carters, farmers, and embroiderers.

== Church ==
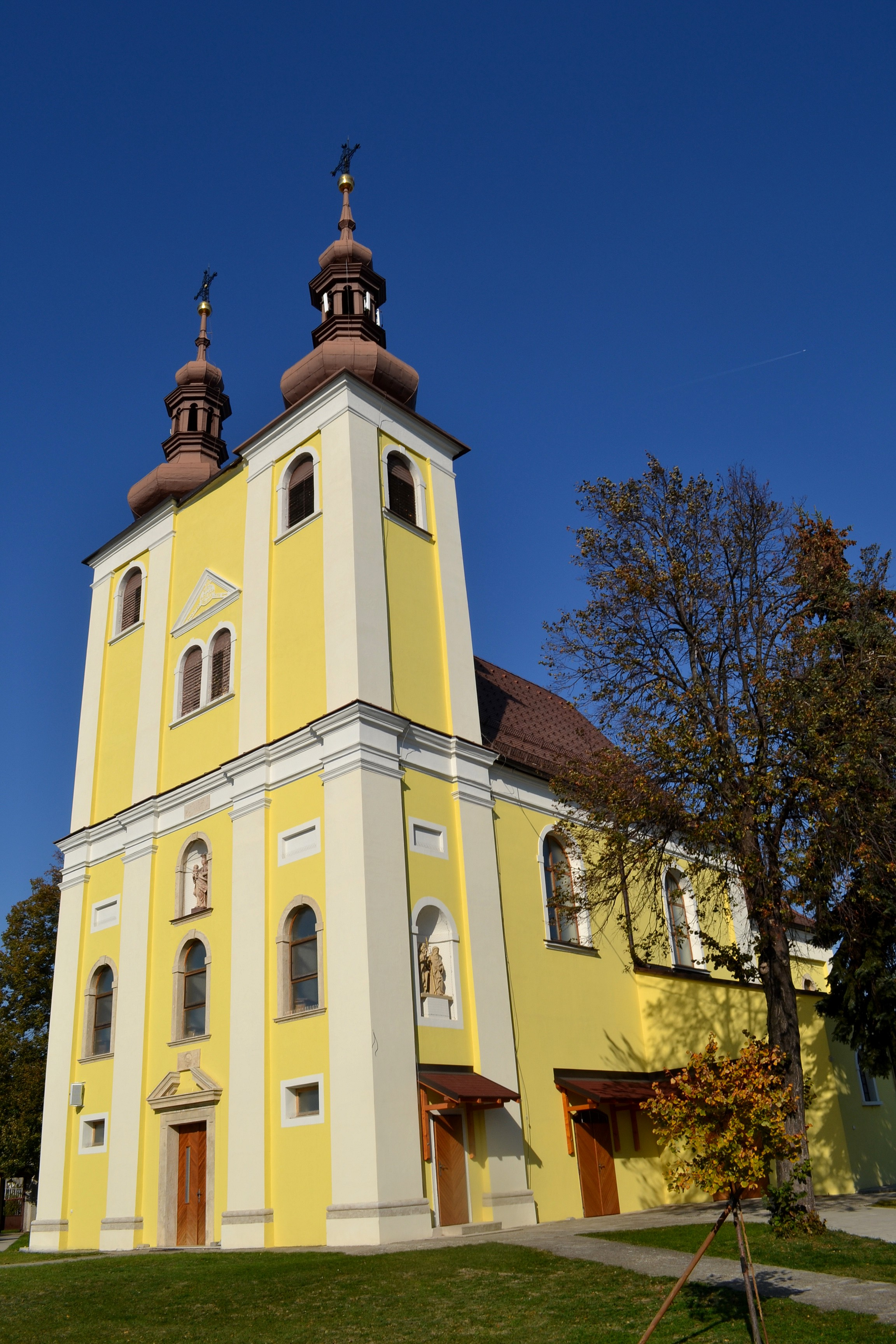
The church

The church and cemetery in Modranka are mentioned in records from the 16th century. The local pilgrimage church dedicated to the Holy Trinity was built between 1650 and 1657 in the Baroque style, replacing an earlier Chapel of the Holy Sepulchre from 1629–1632. Its design was likely inspired by the Church of St. John the Baptist in Trnava, evident in its facade with two prismatic towers topped with Onion domes. The church has a single nave ending in a polygonal presbytery, vaulted with a cross vault. A Loreto chapel was added on the north side in 1659, and extended in 1767 to its current form. After the 1683 Turkish threat, pilgrimages increased due to the villagers' faith in the Virgin Mary's protection, which legend attributes to a fog halting the invaders. The church burned several times in the early 19th century, but was extended in 1957–1958, and its current interior dates from 1968. In 1944, the Lourdes grotto was added in front of the church.
