= Oleksandr Avramenko =

Ukrainian footballer (born 1999)

Personal information
- Full name: Oleksandr Volodymyrovych Avramenko
- Date of birth: 22 March 1999 (age 27)
- Place of birth: Dnipropetrovsk, Ukraine
- Height: 1.85 m (6 ft 1 in)
- Position: Centre-back

Team information
- Current team: Metalist Kharkiv

Youth career
- 2009: ISTA Dnipropetrovsk
- 2009: Samara Dnipropetrovsk
- 2009–2013: ISTA Dnipropetrovsk
- 2013–2016: Metalist Kharkiv

Senior career*
Years	Team	Apps	(Gls)
2016	Metalist Kharkiv	0	(0)
2016–2018	Zorya Luhansk	0	(0)
2018–2020	Karpaty Lviv	0	(0)
2021	Karpaty Halych	5	(0)
2021–2022	Karpaty Halych	9	(0)
2022–	Metalist Kharkiv	0	(0)

International career^{‡}
2014–2016	Ukraine U17	26	(1)
2016–2017	Ukraine U18	5	(0)
2017–2018	Ukraine U19	8	(0)
- * Club domestic league appearances and goals as of 18 October 2022 ‡ National team caps and goals as of 18 October 2022

Oleksandr Volodymyrovych Avramenko (Ukrainian: Олександр Володимирович Авраменко; born 22 March 1999) is a Ukrainian professional footballer who plays as a centre-back for Ukrainian Premier League club Metalist Kharkiv.

In 2020, he tried out for the Spanish club CD Lugo.
