= Natalia Pakulska =

Polish footballer

Personal information
- Full name: Natalia Pakulska
- Date of birth: 27 November 1991 (age 34)
- Place of birth: Brześć Kujawski, Poland
- Position: Midfielder

Team information
- Current team: Słupczanka Słupca
- Number: 10

Youth career
- Duet Włocławek
- 2005–2008: Medyk Konin

Senior career*
Years	Team	Apps	(Gls)
2008–2023	Medyk Konin		
2023	Słupczanka Słupca	9	(1)
2024	Polonia Środa Wielkopolska	10	(1)
2024–2025	Medyk Konin	0	(0)
2025–	Słupczanka Słupca	21	(1)

International career
2011–2016	Poland	37	(6)
- * Club domestic league appearances and goals as of 21:56, 2 July 2026 (UTC)

Natalia Pakulska (born 27 November 1991) is a Polish professional footballer who plays as a midfielder for II liga club Słupczanka Słupca.

She was a member of the Poland national team.

== Club career ==
She started playing against local boys in her home town of Brześć Kujawski at the age of 9. After joining Duet Włocławek, she was spotted by scouts when the team took part in a women's tournament in Konin and was invited to train at Medyk Konin, who she joined at the age of 14 under the coaching of Anna Gawrońska.

== Personal life ==
Pakulska was born in Brześć Kujawski. She studies physical education in the Państwowa Wyższa Szkoła Zawodowa.

== Career statistics ==
=== International ===
Appearances and goals by national team and year
National team	Year	Apps	Goals
Poland	2011	4	0
Poland	2012	6	0
Poland	2013	5	0
Poland	2014	14	6
Poland	2015	1	0
Poland	2016	7	0
Total		37	6

== Honours ==
Medyk Konin

- Ekstraliga: 2013–14, 2014–15, 2015–16, 2016–17
- Polish Cup: 2012–13, 2013–14, 2014–15, 2015–16, 2016–17, 2018–19
