= Monika Todorovska =

Macedonian footballer

Personal information
- Date of birth: 10 April 1995 (age 31)
- Position: Defender

International career^{‡}
Years	Team	Apps	(Gls)
2011	North Macedonia U-17	3	(0)
2012–2013	North Macedonia U-19	4	(2)
2014	North Macedonia	5	(0)
- ‡ National team caps and goals as of 13:33, 19 September 2021 (UTC)

Monika Todorovska (born 10 April 1995) is a Macedonian footballer who plays as a defender for the North Macedonia national team.

== International career ==
Todorovska made her debut for the North Macedonia national team on 10 April 2014, against Spain.
