= Chris Jastrzembski =

Polish-German footballer

Personal information
- Date of birth: 9 September 1996 (age 30)
- Place of birth: Rendsburg, Germany
- Height: 1.82 m (6 ft 0 in)
- Positions: Defender; midfielder

Youth career
- –2007: TSV Kropp
- 2007–2009: FC Haddeby 04
- 2009–2011: HSV
- 2011–2014: Holstein Kiel

Senior career*
| Years | Team | Apps | (Gls) |
| 2014–2016 | Bytovia Bytów | 27 | (1) |
| 2016–2017 | VfB Auerbach | 9 | (0) |
| 2016–2017 | → VfB Auerbach II (loan) | 3 | (0) |
| 2017–2018 | TSV Schilksee | 23 | (2) |
| 2018–2020 | TuS Collegia Jübek | 39 | (9) |
| 2020 | Husumer SV | 4 | (2) |
| 2021 | B68 Toftir | 23 | (0) |
| 2022 | UMF Selfoss | 9 | (0) |
| 2022–2023 | Prey Veng | 10 | (0) |
| 2023 | Tvøroyrar Bóltfelag | 8 | (0) |

International career
| 2014 | Poland U18 | 4 | (0) |
| 2014–2015 | Poland U19 | 8 | (0) |
- * Club domestic league appearances and goals as of 13 June 2023

Chris Jastrzembski (born 9 September 1996) is a professional footballer who plays as a defender or midfielder. Born in Germany, he represented Polish youth national teams.

== Club career ==
In 2014, Jastrzembski signed for Polish second division side Bytovia Bytów after playing for the youth academy of Holstein Kiel in the German third division, where he suffered a ligament rupture and made 27 league appearances and scored 1 goal.

In 2017, he signed for German fifth division club TSV Schilksee after playing for VfB Auerbach in the German fourth division.

In 2018, Jastrzembski signed for German sixth division team TuS Collegia Jübek.

Before the 2021 season, he signed for B68 in the Faroe Islands after playing for German fifth division outfit Husumer SV.

Upon leaving UMF Selfoss and Iceland he described it as the "worst country I have ever been to" citing experiences of poor treatment and racism towards him.

After unsuccessfully trialing at Śląsk Wrocław and receiving offers from clubs such as Club Green Streets of the Maledives, FC Ulaanbaatar of Mongolia, Sheikh Russel KC of Bangladesh, as well as unnamed clubs from Bosnia, Norway, Northern Macedonia, Austria, Cyprus, Sri Lanka, Thailand, Cambodia, and Botswana; he eventually chose Prey Veng in C-League 2.

On 6 March 2023, it was announced Jastrzemski returned to the Faroe Islands to join Tvøroyrar Bóltfelag.

== Personal life ==
His brother, Dennis, is also a footballer. In Iceland, he also worked as a physiotherapist and groundskeeper alongside his playing duties.
