= Mateusz Spychała =

Polish footballer

Personal information
- Full name: Mateusz Spychała
- Date of birth: 28 January 1998 (age 28)
- Place of birth: Sieraków, Poland
- Height: 1.71 m (5 ft 7 in)
- Position: Right-back

Team information
- Current team: Odra Opole
- Number: 22

Youth career
- –2008: Warta Sieraków
- 2008–2015: Lech Poznań

Senior career*
Years	Team	Apps	(Gls)
2015–2016	Lech Poznań II	8	(0)
2016–2017	Radomiak Radom	27	(0)
2017–2018	Wigry Suwałki	18	(1)
2018–2019	Stal Mielec	30	(0)
2019–2020	Korona Kielce	24	(0)
2020–2021	Warta Poznań	7	(0)
2021–	Odra Opole	104	(2)

International career
2013	Poland U16	2	(0)
2014–2015	Poland U17	8	(1)
2015	Poland U18	4	(0)
2016–2017	Poland U19	7	(0)
2018–2019	Poland U20	3	(0)
- * Club domestic league appearances and goals as of 08:31, 27 May 2026 (UTC)

Mateusz Spychała (born 28 January 1998) is a Polish professional footballer who plays as a right-back for I liga club Odra Opole.

== Club career ==
In 2019, Spychała signed for Korona Kielce.

On 21 August 2020, he signed a two-year contract with Warta Poznań.
