= Mateusz Szwed =

Polish footballer

Personal information
- Full name: Mateusz Szwed
- Date of birth: 10 February 2000 (age 26)
- Place of birth: Chełm, Poland
- Height: 1.77 m (5 ft 9 1/2 in)
- Position: Midfielder

Team information
- Current team: Mazovia Mińsk Mazowiecki
- Number: 8

Youth career
- –2013: Niedźwiadek Chełm
- 2013–2017: Legia Warsaw

Senior career*
Years	Team	Apps	(Gls)
2017–2019	Legia Warsaw II	2	(0)
2019–2021	Zagłębie Sosnowiec	40	(2)
2022	Alki Oroklini	12	(0)
2022–2023	Chełmianka Chełm	19	(1)
2023–2025	Legionovia Legionowo	54	(8)
2025–2026	Ząbkovia Ząbki	12	(2)
2026–	Mazovia Mińsk Mazowiecki	17	(2)

International career
2017	Poland U17	2	(0)
- * Club domestic league appearances and goals as of 21:36, 22 June 2026 (UTC)

Mateusz Szwed (born 10 February 2000) is a Polish professional footballer who plays as a midfielder for III liga club Mazovia Mińsk Mazowiecki.

== Club career ==
Born in Chełm, Szwed started his career at Niedźwiadek Chełm before joining the youth teams of Legia Warsaw at the age of 13. He was released by the club in December 2018 following the expiration of his contract. Szwed signed for Zagłębie Sosnowiec in March 2019.

On 5 July 2023, Szwed signed a two-year contract with III liga club Legionovia Legionowo.

== International career ==
Szwed has made two appearances for Poland at under-17 level.

== Career statistics ==
As of match played 17 June 2026

Appearances and goals by club, season and competition
Club	Season	League			National cup (Note: Includes Polish Cup)		Other		Total	
Club	Season	Division	Apps	Goals	Apps	Goals	Apps	Goals	Apps	Goals
Legia Warsaw II	2016–17	III liga, group I	1	0	—		—		1	0
Legia Warsaw II	2017–18	III liga, group I	1	0	—		—		1	0
Legia Warsaw II	2018–19	III liga, group I	0	0	—		—		0	0
Legia Warsaw II	Total		2	0	—		—		2	0
Zagłębie Sosnowiec	2018–19	Ekstraklasa	0	0	—		—		0	0
Zagłębie Sosnowiec	2019–20	I liga	22	1	1	0	—		23	1
Zagłębie Sosnowiec	2020–21	I liga	18	1	1	0	—		19	1
Zagłębie Sosnowiec	Total		40	2	2	0	—		42	2
Alki Oroklini	2021–22	Cypriot Second Division	12	0	—		—		12	0
Chełmianka Chełm	2022–23	III liga, group IV	19	1	—		—		19	1
Legionovia Legionowo	2023–24	III liga, group I	30	4	—		—		30	4
Legionovia Legionowo	2024–25	IV liga Masovia	24	4	—		—		24	4
Legionovia Legionowo	Total		54	8	—		—		54	8
Ząbkovia Ząbki	2025–26	III liga, group I	12	2	—		—		12	2
Mazovia Mińsk Mazowiecki	2025–26	IV liga Masovia	16	2	—		1 (Note: Appearance in IV liga promotion play-offs)	0	17	2
Career total			155	15	2	0	1	0	158	15
