= Paweł Łysiak =

Polish footballer

Personal information
- Date of birth: 7 January 1996 (age 30)
- Place of birth: Koszalin, Poland
- Height: 1.80 m (5 ft 11 in)
- Position: Midfielder

Team information
- Current team: Wieczysta Kraków II

Youth career
- –2009: Passat Bukowo Morskie
- 2009–2012: Bałtyk Koszalin
- 2014–2015: → Wolfsburg (loan)

Senior career*
Years	Team	Apps	(Gls)
2012–2014	Bałtyk Koszalin	12	(1)
2015	Wisła Płock	4	(0)
2015–2016	Kotwica Kołobrzeg	8	(1)
2016–2017	Eichede	28	(1)
2017–2018	Gwardia Koszalin	8	(0)
2018	→ Bałtyk Koszalin (loan)	16	(15)
2018–2019	Bałtyk Koszalin	33	(15)
2019–2020	Błękitni Stargard	33	(0)
2020–2021	Korona Kielce	27	(1)
2021–2022	Bałtyk Koszalin	12	(6)
2022–2023	Kotwica Kołobrzeg	49	(12)
2023–2026	Wieczysta Kraków	79	(28)
2026	GKS Tychy	13	(2)
2026–	Wieczysta Kraków II	0	(0)

International career
- Poland U17
2014	Poland U18	2	(0)
2014–2015	Poland U19	11	(2)
- * Club domestic league appearances and goals as of 15:42, 26 May 2026 (UTC)

Paweł Łysiak (born 7 January 1996) is a Polish professional footballer who plays as a midfielder for III liga club Wieczysta Kraków II.

== Career ==
At the age of 12, Łysiak debuted for Passat Bukowo Morskie in the Polish seventh division.

For the second half of the 2013–14 season, he joined the youth academy of German Bundesliga side Wolfsburg amid offers from Roma in the Italian Serie A.

In 2016, he signed for German fourth division club Eichede from Kotwica Kołobrzeg in the Polish second division.

For the second half of the 2017–18 season, Łysiak signed for Polish fifth division team Bałtyk Koszalin.

In 2020, he signed for Polish I liga side Korona Kielce.

== Honours ==
Bałtyk Koszalin

- IV liga West Pomerania: 2012–13, 2017–18
- Polish Cup (West Pomerania regionals): 2012–13, 2017–18

Kotwica Kołobrzeg

- III liga, group II: 2021–22

Wieczysta Kraków

- III liga, group IV: 2023–24
