= Michael Olczyk =

Polish footballer (born 1997)

Personal information
- Full name: Michael Carsten Olczyk
- Date of birth: 8 March 1997 (age 29)
- Place of birth: Dorsten, Germany
- Height: 1.75 m (5 ft 9 in)
- Position: Right-back

Team information
- Current team: Viktoria Heiden
- Number: 8

Youth career
- 2003–2007: FC Rot-Weiss Dorsten 1919
- 2007–2016: FC Schalke 04

Senior career*
Years	Team	Apps	(Gls)
2016–2017	FC Schalke 04 II	2	(0)
2017–2018	Olimpia Grudziądz	12	(0)
2018–2020	Arka Gdynia	8	(0)
2021–2023	Berliner AK 07	25	(1)
2024	SV Schermbeck	9	(1)
2024–	Viktoria Heiden	47	(14)

International career
	Poland U17	9	(0)
2014–2015	Poland U18	4	(1)
2015	Poland U19	3	(0)
2016–2017	Poland U20	3	(0)
- * Club domestic league appearances and goals as of 21:33, 1 June 2026 (UTC)

Michael Carsten Olczyk (born 8 March 1997) is a Polish professional footballer who plays as a right-back for German club Viktoria Heiden. He was born and raised in Germany and also holds German citizenship.
