= Aleksandra Rompa =

Polish footballer (born 1991)

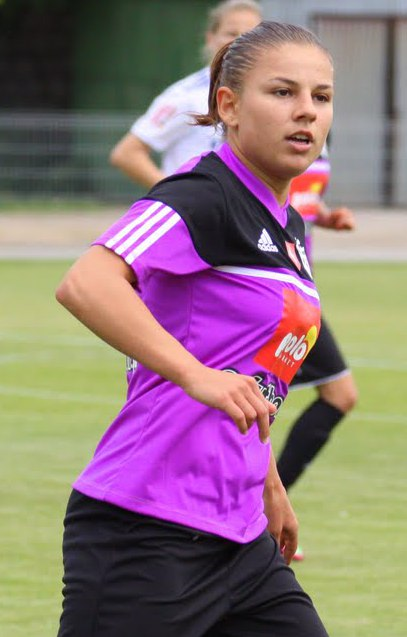
- Sikora with Medyk Konin in 2013

Personal information
- Full name: Aleksandra Franciszka Rompa
- Date of birth: 7 February 1991 (age 35)
- Place of birth: Kędzierzyn-Koźle, Poland
- Positions: Defender; midfielder

Youth career
- Promień Mosty

Senior career*
Years	Team	Apps	(Gls)
2009–2017	Medyk Konin		(95)
2017–2018	Brescia Calcio	20	(4)
2018–2020	Juventus	26	(0)
2020–2021	Klepp IL	12	(0)
2021	AP Orlen Gdańsk	7	(0)

International career
2010–2021	Poland	79	(9)
- * Club domestic league appearances and goals

Aleksandra Franciszka Rompa (née Sikora; born 7 February 1991) is a Polish former professional footballer who played as a defender or midfielder.

== Personal life ==
Rompa was born in Kędzierzyn-Koźle, from which she moved out at the age of nine. She worked as a football trainer at a school in Konin and has a UEFA B coaching license.

In 2020, she took her husband's name Rompa.

== Club career ==
Her career begun at Promień Mosty, a club near Goleniów, where she played in the women's team at the Inne Ligi Kobiet (third division). Her studies brought her to Konin and eventually to Medyk Konin, where she first played as a forward in the 1. Liga (second division). At the age of 16 she scored a hat-trick in four consecutive league matches. Sikora went on play in the Ekstraliga (first division) and the UEFA Women's Champions League with the club. Despite her goalscoring ability, coach Roman Jaszczak first moved her to right midfield, and then coach Nina Patalon decided to play her as a defender.

On 13 July 2018, she joined Serie A club Juventus.

== International career ==
She mainly played as a defender for the Poland national team. She scored her first goal on 12 February 2014, during a friendly match against Luxembourg. Sikora was the captain of the team since 2014.

== Career statistics ==
=== International ===
Appearances and goals by national team and year
National team	Year	Apps	Goals
Poland	2010	1	0
Poland	2011	3	0
Poland	2012	3	0
Poland	2013	7	0
Poland	2014	14	2
Poland	2015	11	2
Poland	2016	11	0
Poland	2017	8	2
Poland	2018	12	0
Poland	2019	6	0
Poland	2020	2	3
Poland	2021	1	0
Total		79	9

== Honours ==
Medyk Konin

- Ekstraliga: 2013–14, 2014–15, 2015–16, 2016–17
- Polish Cup: 2012–13, 2013–14, 2014–15, 2015–16, 2016–17

Brescia

- Supercoppa Italiana: 2017

Juventus

- Serie A: 2018–19, 2019–20
- Coppa Italia: 2018–19
- Supercoppa Italiana: 2020
