= Shved =

Shved (Cyrillic: Швед) is an Eastern Slavic surname that means "Swede". Notable people with this name include:

- Alexey Shved (born 1988), Russian basketball player
- Avigail Shved (born 2010), Israeli rhythmic gymnast
- Vasyl Shved (born 1971), Ukrainian football player
- Marian Shved (born 1997), Ukrainian football player, son of Vasyl
