= Przemysław Mystkowski =

Polish footballer (born 1998)

Personal information
- Full name: Przemysław Mystkowski
- Date of birth: 25 April 1998 (age 28)
- Place of birth: Białystok, Poland
- Height: 1.77 m (5 ft 9 1/2 in)
- Position: Attacking midfielder

Youth career
- –2013: Jagiellonia Białystok

Senior career*
Years	Team	Apps	(Gls)
2013–2022	Jagiellonia Białystok	87	(4)
2017–2018	→ Miedź Legnica (loan)	25	(3)
2018–2019	→ Podbeskidzie (loan)	21	(0)
2023	Iraklis	6	(0)
2023–2025	GKS Tychy	20	(0)
2025–2026	Jagiellonia Białystok II	13	(1)

International career
2013–2014	Poland U16	5	(1)
2014	Poland U17	6	(1)
2015–2016	Poland U18	6	(0)
2016–2017	Poland U19	1	(0)
2017–2018	Poland U20	3	(0)
- * Club domestic league appearances and goals as of 17:35, 5 June 2026 (UTC)

Przemysław Mystkowski (born 25 April 1998) is a Polish professional footballer who plays as an attacking midfielder.

== Honours ==
Miedź Legnica

- I liga: 2017–18

Jagiellonia II

- IV liga Podlasie: 2019–20
