= 2022–23 Lech Poznań season =

Lech Poznań
2022–23 season
- Chairman: Karol Klimczak; Since 1 November 2011; Piotr Rutkowski; Since 27 January 2021
- Manager: John van den Brom; Since 19 June 2022
- Stadium: Stadion Miejski
- Ekstraklasa: 3rd
- Polish Cup: Round of 32
- Polish Super Cup: Runners-up
- UEFA Champions League: First qualifying round
- UEFA Europa Conference League: Quarter-finals
- Top goalscorer: League: Mikael Ishak (11 goals); All: Mikael Ishak (20 goals)
- Highest home attendance: UEFA Europa Conference League: 41,609 vs. Fiorentina (13 April 2023)
- Lowest home attendance: Polish Cup: 6,854 vs. Śląsk (19 October 2022)
- Average home league attendance: 21,191
- Biggest win: UEFA Europa Conference League: Lech 5–0 Batumi (21 July 2022); Ekstraklasa: Lech 5–0 Lechia (3 March 2023)
- Biggest defeat: UEFA Champions League: Qarabağ 5–1 Lech (12 July 2022)
Home colours	Away colours	Third colours

The 2022–23 season was Lech Poznań's 101st season in existence and the club's 21st consecutive season in the top flight of Polish football. In addition to the domestic league, Lech Poznań participated in this season's edition of the Polish Cup, the Polish Super Cup, the UEFA Champions League and the UEFA Europa Conference League. The season covered the period from 1 July 2022 to 30 June 2023.

== Club ==
=== Coaching staff ===
Position	Staff
Coach	(Netherlands) John van den Brom
Assistant coach	(Netherlands) Denny Landzaat
Assistant coach	(Poland) Dariusz Dudka
Assistant coach	(Poland) Maciej Kędziorek
Goalkeeping coach	(Poland) Maciej Palczewski
Fitness coach	(Czech Republic) Antonin Čepek
Fitness coach	(Poland) Karol Kikut
Match analyst	(Poland) Hubert Barański
Match analyst	(Poland) Hubert Wędzonka
Team Doctor	(Poland) Krzysztof Pawlaczyk
Team Doctor	(Poland) Damian Bartkiewicz
Team Doctor	(Poland) Jakub Stefaniak
Physiotherapist	(Poland) Maciej Łopatka
Physiotherapist	(Poland) Marcin Lis
Physiotherapist	(Poland) Maciej Smuniewski
Dietician	(Poland) Patryk Wiśniewski
Team Manager	(Poland) Mariusz Skrzypczak
Kit Manager	(Poland) Sławomir Mizgalski
Head of the Scientific Department	(Poland) Bartłomiej Grzelak
Cook	(Poland) Artur Dzierzbicki

Source: Lech Poznań

=== Management ===
Position	Staff
Chairman	(Poland) Karol Klimczak
Chairman	(Poland) Piotr Rutkowski
Sporting director	(Poland) Tomasz Rząsa

Source: Lech Poznań

== Current squad ==
As of 19 March 2023

Note: Flags indicate national team as defined under FIFA eligibility rules; some limited exceptions apply. Players may hold more than one non-FIFA nationality.

No.	Pos.	Nation	Player
1	GK	(Ukraine) UKR	Artur Rudko (on loan from (Ukraine) Metalist Kharkiv)
2	DF	(Portugal) POR	Joel Pereira
3	DF	(Scotland) SCO	Barry Douglas
5	DF	(Portugal) POR	Pedro Rebocho
6	MF	(Sweden) SWE	Jesper Karlström
7	MF	(Portugal) POR	Afonso Sousa
9	FW	(Sweden) SWE	Mikael Ishak (captain)
11	MF	(Poland) POL	Filip Marchwiński
14	MF	(Georgia (country)) GEO	Heorhiy Tsitaishvili (on loan from (Ukraine) Dynamo Kyiv)
15	DF	(Poland) POL	Michał Gurgul
16	DF	(Croatia) CRO	Antonio Milić
17	FW	(Poland) POL	Filip Szymczak
18	DF	(Poland) POL	Bartosz Salamon
21	MF	(Poland) POL	Michał Skóraś

No.	Pos.	Nation	Player
22	MF	(Poland) POL	Radosław Murawski
23	MF	(Norway) NOR	Kristoffer Velde
24	MF	(Portugal) POR	João Amaral
25	DF	(Sweden) SWE	Filip Dagerstål (on loan from (Russia) Khimki)
27	DF	(Poland) POL	Mateusz Żukowski (on loan from (Scotland) Rangers)
30	MF	(Georgia (country)) GEO	Nika Kvekveskiri
35	GK	(Poland) POL	Filip Bednarek
37	DF	(Slovakia) SVK	Ľubomír Šatka
44	DF	(Poland) POL	Alan Czerwiński
50	MF	(Ivory Coast) CIV	Adriel Ba Loua
74	MF	(Poland) POL	Jakub Antczak
77	GK	(Slovakia) SVK	Dominik Holec (on loan from (Czech Republic) Sparta Prague)
90	FW	(Poland) POL	Artur Sobiech

=== Out on loan ===
Note: Flags indicate national team as defined under FIFA eligibility rules; some limited exceptions apply. Players may hold more than one non-FIFA nationality.

No.	Pos.	Nation	Player
20	DF	(Poland) POL	Maksymilian Pingot (at Odra Opole until 30 June 2023)
28	DF	(Poland) POL	Filip Borowski (at Zagłębie Sosnowiec until 30 June 2023)
31	GK	(Poland) POL	Krzysztof Bąkowski (at Stal Rzeszów until 30 June 2023)

No.	Pos.	Nation	Player
33	GK	(Poland) POL	Bartosz Mrozek (at Stal Mielec until 30 June 2023)
43	MF	(Poland) POL	Antoni Kozubal (at GKS Katowice until 30 June 2023)

== Transfer ==
=== Summer transfer window ===
==== In ====
No.	Pos.	Nat.	Name	Age	EU	Moving from	Type	Transfer window	Ends	Transfer fee	Source
31	GK	(Poland)	Krzysztof Bąkowski	19	EU	Stomil Olsztyn	Loan return	Summer	2024	Free	
15	MF	(Poland)	Maksym Czekała	18	EU		Transfer	Summer	2024	Youth system	
25	MF	(Sweden)	Filip Dagerstål	25	EU	(Russia) Khimki	Loan	Summer	2023	Free	
43	MF	(Poland)	Antoni Kozubal	17	EU	Górnik Polkowice	Loan return	Summer	2025	Free	
	MF	(Poland)	Juliusz Letniowski	24	EU	Widzew Łódź	Loan return	Summer		Free	
15	MF	(Croatia)	Karlo Muhar	26	EU	(Bulgaria) CSKA Sofia	Loan return	Summer		Free	
1	GK	(Ukraine)	Artur Rudko	30	Non-EU	(Ukraine) Metalist Kharkiv	Loan	Summer	2023	Free	
7	MF	(Portugal)	Afonso Sousa	22	EU	(Portugal) B-SAD	Transfer	Summer	2026	€1,200,000	
8	MF	(Czech Republic)	Jan Sýkora	28	EU	(Czech Republic) Viktoria Plzeň	Loan return	Summer		Free	
17	FW	(Poland)	Filip Szymczak	20	EU	GKS Katowice	Loan return	Summer	2027	Free	
14	MF	(Georgia (country)) (Ukraine)	Heorhiy Tsitaishvili	21	Non-EU	(Ukraine) Dynamo Kyiv	Loan	Summer	2023	€100,000	
27	DF	(Poland)	Mateusz Żukowski	20	EU	(Scotland) Rangers	Loan	Summer	2023	Free	

Total spending: ▼€1,300,000

==== Out ====
No.	Pos.	Nat.	Name	Age	EU	Moving to	Type	Transfer window	Transfer fee	Source
7	MF	(Poland)	Jakub Kamiński	19	EU	(Germany) VfL Wolfsburg	Transfer	Summer	€10,000,000	
4	DF	(Poland)	Tomasz Kędziora	28	EU	(Ukraine) Dynamo Kyiv	Loan return	Summer	Free	
34	MF	(Poland)	Tymoteusz Klupś	22	EU	Zagłębie Sosnowiec	End of contract	Summer	Free	
97	FW	(Poland)	Dawid Kownacki	25	EU	(Germany) Fortuna Düsseldorf	Loan return	Summer	Free	
	MF	(Poland)	Juliusz Letniowski	24	EU	Widzew Łódź	Transfer	Summer	Free	
15	MF	(Croatia)	Karlo Muhar	26	EU	(Romania) CFR Cluj	Transfer	Summer	€100,000	
10	MF	(Spain)	Dani Ramírez	30	EU	(Belgium) Zulte Waregem	Transfer	Summer	Free	
27	DF	(Poland)	Mateusz Skrzypczak	21	EU	Jagiellonia Białystok	End of contract	Summer	Free	
8	MF	(Czech Republic)	Jan Sýkora	28	EU	(Czech Republic) Viktoria Plzeň	Transfer	Summer	Undisclosed	
25	MF	(Portugal)	Pedro Tiba	33	EU	(Portugal) Gil Vicente	End of contract	Summer	Free	
1	GK	(Netherlands)	Mickey van der Hart	27	EU	(Netherlands) FC Emmen	End of contract	Summer	Free	

Total income: ▲€10,100,000

Total expenditure: ▲€8,800,000

=== Winter transfer window ===
==== In ====
No.	Pos.	Nat.	Name	Age	EU	Moving from	Type	Transfer window	Ends	Transfer fee	Source
15	DF	(Poland)	Michał Gurgul	16	EU		Transfer	Winter	2026	Youth system	
77	GK	(Slovakia)	Dominik Holec	28	EU	(Czech Republic) Sparta Prague	Loan	Winter	2023	Free	

Total spending: €0

==== Out ====
No.	Pos.	Nat.	Name	Age	EU	Moving to	Type	Transfer window	Transfer fee	Source
31	GK	(Poland)	Krzysztof Bąkowski	19	EU	Stal Rzeszów	Loan	Winter	Free	
43	MF	(Poland)	Antoni Kozubal	18	EU	GKS Katowice	Loan	Winter	Free	
99	GK	(Poland)	Miłosz Mleczko	23	EU	Znicz Pruszków	Transfer	Winter	Free	
	DF	(Poland)	Krystian Palacz	19	EU	Sandecja Nowy Sącz	Loan	Winter	Free	
20	DF	(Poland)	Maksymilian Pingot	19	EU	Odra Opole	Loan	Winter	Free	

Total income: €0

Total expenditure: €0

== Friendlies ==
Win Draw Loss Fixtures

18 June 2022 Club friendly	Lech Poznań	1–2	Widzew Łódź	Poznań
11:30 CEST (UTC+02:00)	Pacławski 51'	90minut Official website	Danielak 9'; Żyro 58'	Stadium: Stadion Miejski; Attendance: 0

23 June 2022 Club friendly	Lech Poznań	0–1	Pogoń Szczecin	Opalenica
17:00 CEST (UTC+02:00)		90minut Official website	Kowalczyk 29'	Stadium: Stadion Miejski

28 June 2022 Club friendly	Lech Poznań	2–1	Jagiellonia Białystok	Poznań
17:00 CEST (UTC+02:00)	Milić 49', 57'	90minut	Černych 16'	Stadium: Stadion Miejski; Attendance: 0

8 January 2023 Club friendly	Ajman Club (United Arab Emirates)	1–1	Lech Poznań	Ajman, United Arab Emirates
13:50 CET (UTC+01:00)	Faiz 56'	90minut Official website	Skóraś 19'	Stadium: Ajman Stadium

13 January 2023 Club friendly	Lech Poznań	0–1	(Germany) Eintracht Frankfurt	Jebel Ali, United Arab Emirates
10:05 CET (UTC+01:00)		90minut Official website	Kamada 51'	Stadium: Jebel Ali Centre of Excellence; Attendance: 0

13 January 2023 Club friendly	Lech Poznań	2–2	(Germany) Eintracht Frankfurt	Jebel Ali, United Arab Emirates
12:15 CET (UTC+01:00)	Sobiech 11'; Kvekveskiri 23'	90minut Official website	Alario 41'; Buta 78'	Stadium: Jebel Ali Centre of Excellence; Attendance: 0

21 January 2023 Club friendly	Lech Poznań	4–0	(Germany) Hansa Rostock	Poznań
12:05 CET (UTC+01:00)	Sobiech 23', 68'; Marchwiński 63'; Dziuba 86'	90minut Official website		Stadium: Lech Poznań training ground Attendance: 0

21 January 2023 Club friendly	Lech Poznań	0–0	(Germany) Hansa Rostock	Poznań
14:55 CET (UTC+01:00)		90minut Official website		Stadium: Lech Poznań training ground Attendance: 0

== Competitions ==
=== Overview ===
Competition	First match	Last match	Starting round	Final position	Record							
Competition	First match	Last match	Starting round	Final position	Pld	W	D	L	GF	GA	GD	Win %
Ekstraklasa	16 July 2022	27 May 2023	Matchday 1	3rd	34	17	10	7	51	29	+22	50.00
Polish Cup	19 October 2022		Round of 32	Round of 32	1	0	0	1	1	3	−2	0.00
Polish Super Cup	9 July 2022		Final	Runners-up	1	0	0	1	0	2	−2	0.00
UEFA Champions League	5 July 2022	12 July 2022	First qualifying round	First qualifying round	2	1	0	1	2	5	−3	50.00
UEFA Europa Conference League	21 July 2022	20 April 2023	Second qualifying round	Quarter-finals	18	9	6	3	35	17	+18	50.00
Total					56	27	16	13	89	56	+33	48.21

Last updated: 27 May 2023
Source: Competitions

=== Ekstraklasa ===
==== League table ====
Pos	Team	Pld	W	D	L	GF	GA	GD	Pts	Qualification or relegation
1	Raków Częstochowa (C)	34	23	6	5	63	24	+39	75	Qualification for the Champions League first qualifying round
2	Legia Warsaw	34	19	9	6	57	37	+20	66	Qualification for the Europa Conference League second qualifying round (Note: Since the winner of the 2022–23 Polish Cup qualified for the Europa Conference League based on league position, the third Europa Conference League second qualifying round berth was transferred to the 4th-placed team.)
3	Lech Poznań	34	17	10	7	51	29	+22	61	Qualification for the Europa Conference League second qualifying round
4	Pogoń Szczecin	34	17	9	8	57	46	+11	60	Qualification for the Europa Conference League second qualifying round
5	Piast Gliwice	34	15	8	11	40	31	+9	53	

Source: ekstraklasa.org
Rules for classification: 1) Points; 2) Head-to-head points; 3) Head-to-head goal difference; 4) Goal difference; 5) Goals scored; 6) Number of wins; 7) Number of away wins; 8) Lower number of points based on yellow and red cards (red card = 3 points, yellow card = 1 point, sending-off = 3 points - including 1 point for first yellow card); 9) Fairplay ranking; 10) Draw. (Note: Head-to-head record is used only after all the matches between the teams in question have been played)
(C) Champions

==== Results summary ====
Overall								Home						Away					
Pld	W	D	L	GF	GA	GD	Pts	W	D	L	GF	GA	GD	W	D	L	GF	GA	GD
34	17	10	7	51	29	+22	61	9	2	6	25	15	+10	8	8	1	26	14	+12

Last updated: 27 May 2023.
Source: PKO Ekstraklasa 90minut

==== Results by round ====
Round	1	2	3	4	5	6	7	8	9	10	11	12	13	14	15	16	17	18	19	20	21	22	23	24	25	26	27	28	29	30	31	32	33	34
Ground	H	A	H	A	H	H	A	H	A	A	H	H	A	A	H	H	A	A	H	A	H	A	H	A	A	H	H	A	A	H	H	A	A	H
Result	L	D	L	D	L	W	W	W	D	W	D	W	W	D	L	W	W	D	W	W	L	L	W	D	W	D	W	D	D	L	W	W	W	W
Position	16	13	17	17	18	17	14	7	10	6	8	6	6	6	6	4	3	4	3	3	3	4	3	3	3	3	3	3	3	4	4	4	3	3

Updated to match(es) played on 27 May 2023. Source: PKO Ekstraklasa
A = Away; H = Home; W = Win; D = Draw; L = Loss

==== Matches ====
The league fixtures were announced on 1 June 2022.

16 July 2022 Match 1	Lech Poznań	0–2	Stal Mielec	Poznań
15:00 CEST (UTC+02:00)		Report	Wlazło 14'; Domański 64'	Stadium: Stadion Miejski; Attendance: 12,421; Referee: Damian Kos (Gdańsk)

31 July 2022 Match 3	Lech Poznań	1–3	Wisła Płock	Poznań
17:30 CEST (UTC+02:00)	Skóraś 69'	Report	Vallo 45'; Wolski 50'; Kolar 89'	Stadium: Stadion Miejski; Attendance: 14,131; Referee: Paweł Raczkowski (Warsaw)

7 August 2022 Match 4	Zagłębie Lubin	1–1	Lech Poznań	Lubin
17:30 CEST (UTC+02:00)	Łakomy 58'	Report	Ishak 66' (pen.)	Stadium: Stadion Zagłębia Lubin; Attendance: 11,039; Referee: Bartosz Frankowski (Toruń)

14 August 2022 Match 5	Lech Poznań	0–1	Śląsk Wrocław	Poznań
20:00 CEST (UTC+02:00)		Report	Schwarz 26'	Stadium: Stadion Miejski; Attendance: 11,627; Referee: Piotr Lasyk (Bytom)

28 August 2022 Match 7	Lech Poznań	1–0	Piast Gliwice	Poznań
17:30 CEST (UTC+02:00)	Sousa 5'	Report		Stadium: Stadion Miejski; Attendance: 11,223; Referee: Tomasz Kwiatkowski (Warsaw)

31 August 2022 Match 6	Lechia Gdańsk	0–3	Lech Poznań	Gdańsk
20:30 CEST (UTC+02:00)		Report	Kvekveskiri 19'; Velde 42'; Skóraś 60'	Stadium: Polsat Plus Arena Gdańsk; Attendance: 8,036; Referee: Bartosz Frankowski (Toruń)

4 September 2022 Match 8	Lech Poznań	2–0	Widzew Łódź	Poznań
17:30 CEST (UTC+02:00)	Amaral 80'; Ishak 81'	Report		Stadium: Stadion Miejski; Attendance: 23,725; Referee: Damian Sylwestrzak (Wrocław)

11 September 2022 Match 9	Pogoń Szczecin	2–2	Lech Poznań	Szczecin
15:00 CEST (UTC+02:00)	Kowalczyk 8'; Drygas 90+9' (pen.)	Report	Ishak 20'; Skóraś 48'	Stadium: Stadion Miejski im. Floriana Krygiera; Attendance: 16,859; Referee: Paweł Raczkowski (Warsaw)

18 September 2022 Match 10	Warta Poznań	0–1	Lech Poznań	Poznań
17:30 CEST (UTC+02:00)		Report	Sousa 53'	Stadium: Stadion Miejski; Attendance: 18,755; Referee: Daniel Stefański (Bydgoszcz)

1 October 2022 Match 11	Lech Poznań	0–0	Legia Warsaw	Poznań
17:30 CEST (UTC+02:00)		Report		Stadium: Stadion Miejski; Attendance: 35,410; Referee: Piotr Lasyk (Bytom)

9 October 2022 Match 12	Lech Poznań	1–0	Radomiak Radom	Poznań
17:30 CEST (UTC+02:00)	Tsitaishvili 12'	Report		Stadium: Stadion Miejski; Attendance: 20,883; Referee: Daniel Stefański (Bydgoszcz)

16 October 2022 Match 13	Górnik Zabrze	1–2	Lech Poznań	Zabrze
18:30 CEST (UTC+02:00)	Włodarczyk 10' (pen.)	Report	Ishak 4', 67' (pen.)	Stadium: Stadion im. Ernesta Pohla; Attendance: 15,918; Referee: Bartosz Frankowski (Toruń)

23 October 2022 Match 14	Cracovia	0–0	Lech Poznań	Kraków
17:30 CEST (UTC+02:00)		Report		Stadium: Stadion Cracovii im. Józefa Piłsudskiego; Attendance: 12,159; Referee: Tomasz Kwiatkowski (Warsaw)

30 October 2022 Match 15	Lech Poznań	1–2	Raków Częstochowa	Poznań
17:30 CET (UTC+01:00)	Skóraś 67'	Report	Kun 49'; Piasecki 90+3'	Stadium: Stadion Miejski; Attendance: 22,817; Referee: Paweł Raczkowski (Warsaw)

6 November 2022 Match 16	Lech Poznań	3–2	Korona Kielce	Poznań
17:30 CET (UTC+01:00)	Ishak 41' (pen.); Amaral 47'; Szymczak 90+3'	Report	Łukowski 56' (pen.); Podgórski 79' (pen.)	Stadium: Stadion Miejski; Attendance: 12,745; Referee: Bartosz Frankowski (Toruń)

12 November 2022 Match 17	Jagiellonia Białystok	1–2	Lech Poznań	Białystok
17:30 CET (UTC+01:00)	Skrzypczak 45+1'	Report	Ishak 45+6'; Szymczak 90+1'	Stadium: Stadion Miejski; Attendance: 10,167; Referee: Daniel Stefański (Bydgoszcz)

27 January 2023 Match 18	Stal Mielec	0–0	Lech Poznań	Mielec
20:30 CET (UTC+01:00)		Report		Stadium: Stadion Miejski; Attendance: 6,001; Referee: Paweł Raczkowski (Warsaw)

1 February 2023 Match 2	Miedź Legnica	2–2	Lech Poznań	Legnica
19:00 CET (UTC+01:00)	Narsingh 16'; Masouras 76'	Report	Marchwiński 36'; Ishak 67' (pen.)	Stadium: Stadion im. Orła Białego; Attendance: 4,547; Referee: Daniel Stefański (Bydgoszcz)

5 February 2023 Match 19	Lech Poznań	1–0	Miedź Legnica	Poznań
15:00 CET (UTC+01:00)	Ishak 17'	Report		Stadium: Stadion Miejski; Attendance: 10,820; Referee: Damian Kos (Gdańsk)

11 February 2023 Match 20	Wisła Płock	0–1	Lech Poznań	Płock
17:30 CET (UTC+01:00)		Report	Murawski 20'	Stadium: Stadion im. Kazimierza Górskiego; Attendance: 4,011; Referee: Paweł Malec (Łódź)

19 February 2023 Match 21	Lech Poznań	1–2	Zagłębie Lubin	Poznań
15:00 CET (UTC+01:00)	Sobiech 45'	Report	Kurminowski 23'; Łakomy 35'	Stadium: Stadion Miejski; Attendance: 13,074; Referee: Łukasz Kuźma (Białystok)

26 February 2023 Match 22	Śląsk Wrocław	2–1	Lech Poznań	Wrocław
17:30 CET (UTC+01:00)	Expósito 34'; Yeboah 57'	Report	Skóraś 88'	Stadium: Tarczyński Arena Wrocław; Attendance: 13,922; Referee: Bartosz Frankowski (Toruń)

3 March 2023 Match 23	Lech Poznań	5–0	Lechia Gdańsk	Poznań
20:30 CET (UTC+01:00)	Milić 25'; Skóraś 44'; Ishak 67'; Velde 83', 88'	Report		Stadium: Stadion Miejski; Attendance: 12,541; Referee: Damian Sylwestrzak (Wrocław)

12 March 2023 Match 24	Piast Gliwice	1–1	Lech Poznań	Gliwice
15:00 CET (UTC+01:00)	Chrapek 64'	Report	Kvekveskiri 90+3'	Stadium: Stadion Miejski im. Piotra Wieczorka; Attendance: 5,448; Referee: Daniel Stefański (Bydgoszcz)

19 March 2023 Match 25	Widzew Łódź	1–2	Lech Poznań	Łódź
17:30 CET (UTC+01:00)	Pawłowski 71'	Report	Marchwiński 73'; Velde 78'	Stadium: Stadion Miejski Widzewa; Attendance: 17,489; Referee: Damian Kos (Gdańsk)

2 April 2023 Match 26	Lech Poznań	2–2	Pogoń Szczecin	Poznań
17:30 CEST (UTC+02:00)	Karlström 26'; Ishak 65'	Report	Grosicki 45' (pen.); Gorgon 63'	Stadium: Stadion Miejski; Attendance: 32,119; Referee: Paweł Raczkowski (Warsaw)

8 April 2023 Match 27	Lech Poznań	2–0	Warta Poznań	Poznań
20:00 CEST (UTC+02:00)	Skóraś 34', 88'	Report		Stadium: Stadion Miejski; Attendance: 20,622; Referee: Daniel Stefański (Bydgoszcz)

16 April 2023 Match 28	Legia Warsaw	2–2	Lech Poznań	Warsaw
17:30 CEST (UTC+02:00)	Pekhart 13'; Wszołek 87'	Report	Sousa 47', 69'	Stadium: Stadion Wojska Polskiego; Attendance: 27,416; Referee: Piotr Lasyk (Bytom)

24 April 2023 Match 29	Radomiak Radom	1–1	Lech Poznań	Radom
19:00 CEST (UTC+02:00)	Rocha 9'	Report	Sobiech 84'	Stadium: Stadion Lekkoatletyczno-Piłkarski; Attendance: 4,215; Referee: Tomasz Kwiatkowski (Warsaw)

30 April 2023 Match 30	Lech Poznań	0–1	Górnik Zabrze	Poznań
17:30 CEST (UTC+02:00)		Report	Yokota 44'	Stadium: Stadion Miejski; Attendance: 28,112; Referee: Damian Sylwestrzak (Wrocław)

6 May 2023 Match 31	Lech Poznań	3–0	Cracovia	Poznań
17:30 CEST (UTC+02:00)	Velde 22'; Marchwiński 24'; Skóraś 45'	Report		Stadium: Stadion Miejski; Attendance: 31,123; Referee: Szymon Marciniak (Płock)

14 May 2023 Match 32	Raków Częstochowa	0–2	Lech Poznań	Częstochowa
17:30 CEST (UTC+02:00)		Report	Marchwiński 32'; Velde 73' (pen.)	Stadium: Miejski Stadion Piłkarski "Raków"; Attendance: 5,500; Referee: Daniel Stefański (Bydgoszcz)

19 May 2023 Match 33	Korona Kielce	0–3	Lech Poznań	Kielce
20:30 CEST (UTC+02:00)		Report	Velde 33', 56'; Marchwiński 53'	Stadium: Stadion Miejski; Attendance: 14,279; Referee: Piotr Lasyk (Bytom)

27 May 2023 Match 34	Lech Poznań	2–0	Jagiellonia Białystok	Poznań
17:30 CEST (UTC+02:00)	Sobiech 29'; Šatka 56'	Report		Stadium: Stadion Miejski; Attendance: 39,123; Referee: Szymon Marciniak (Płock)

=== Polish Cup ===
19 October 2022 Round of 32	Lech Poznań	1–3	Śląsk Wrocław	Poznań
20:30 CET (UTC+01:00)	Sousa 25'	Łączy nas piłka 90minut	Expósito 6'; Yeboah 78', 83'	Stadium: Stadion Miejski; Attendance: 6,854; Referee: Tomasz Musiał (Kraków)

=== Polish Super Cup ===
9 July 2022 Final	Lech Poznań	0–2	Raków Częstochowa	Poznań
20:10 CEST (UTC+2)		Łączy nas piłka 90minut	Racovițan 43'; Wdowiak 51'	Stadium: Stadion Miejski; Attendance: 15,898; Referee: Paweł Raczkowski (Warsaw)

=== UEFA Champions League ===
==== First qualifying round ====
5 July 2022 First leg	Lech Poznań (Poland)	1–0	(Azerbaijan) Qarabağ	Poznań, Poland
20:00 CEST (UTC+02:00)	Ishak 41'	Report		Stadium: Stadion Miejski; Attendance: 25,118; Referee: José Luis Munuera (Spain)

12 July 2022 Second leg	Qarabağ (Azerbaijan)	5–1 (5–2 agg.)	(Poland) Lech Poznań	Baku, Azerbaijan
18:00 CEST (UTC+02:00)	Kady 14', 74'; Ozobić 42'; Medina 56'; A. Hüseynov 77'	Report	Velde 1'	Stadium: Tofiq Bahramov Republican Stadium; Attendance: 27,652; Referee: Andrew Madley (England)

=== UEFA Europa Conference League ===
==== Second qualifying round ====
21 July 2022 First leg	Lech Poznań (Poland)	5–0	(Georgia (country)) Dinamo Batumi	Poznań, Poland
18:00 CEST (UTC+02:00)	Skóraś 10', 33'; Amaral 24', 66'; Ishak 90+4'	Report		Stadium: Stadion Miejski; Attendance: 9,111; Referee: Ian McNabb (Northern Ireland)

28 July 2022 Second leg	Dinamo Batumi (Georgia (country))	1–1 (1–6 agg.)	(Poland) Lech Poznań	Batumi, Georgia
19:00 CEST (UTC+02:00)	Vatsadze 64'	Report	Czerwiński 76'	Stadium: Batumi Stadium; Attendance: 19,343; Referee: Igor Stojchevski (North Macedonia)

==== Third qualifying round ====
4 August 2022 First leg	Víkingur Reykjavik (Iceland)	1–0	(Poland) Lech Poznań	Reykjavík, Iceland
20:45 CEST (UTC+02:00)	Sigurpálsson 45'	Report		Stadium: Víkingsvöllur; Attendance: 1,023; Referee: Juxhin Xhaja (Albania)

11 August 2022 Second leg	Lech Poznań (Poland)	4–1 (a.e.t.) (4–2 agg.)	(Iceland) Víkingur Reykjavik	Poznań, Poland
20:30 CEST (UTC+02:00)	Ishak 32'; Velde 44'; Marchwiński 96'; Sousa 119'	Report	Djuric 90+5'	Stadium: Stadion Miejski; Attendance: 12,555; Referee: Julian Weinberger (Austria)

==== Play-off round ====
18 August 2022 First leg	Lech Poznań (Poland)	2–0	(Luxembourg) F91 Dudelange	Poznań, Poland
20:30 CEST (UTC+02:00)	Velde 6'; Ishak 66'	Report		Stadium: Stadion Miejski; Attendance: 9,150; Referee: Manfredas Lukjančukas (Lithuania)

25 August 2022 Second leg	F91 Dudelange (Luxembourg)	1–1 (1–3 agg.)	(Poland) Lech Poznań	Luxembourg City, Luxembourg
20:30 CEST (UTC+02:00)	Kirch 36'	Report	Pereira 60'	Stadium: Stade de Luxembourg (Note: F91 Dudelange will play their home match at the Stade de Luxembourg, in Luxembourg City, instead of their regular stadium, the Stade Jos Nosbaum, in Dudelange, which did not meet UEFA requirements.); Attendance: 1,935; Referee: Nikola Dabanović (Montenegro)

==== Group stage ====
Pos	Team	Pld	W	D	L	GF	GA	GD	Pts	Qualification	VIL	LCH	HBS	AW
1	(Spain) Villarreal	6	4	1	1	14	9	+5	13	Advance to round of 16	—	4–3	2–2	5–0
2	(Poland) Lech Poznań	6	2	3	1	12	7	+5	9	Advance to knockout round play-offs	3–0	—	0–0	4–1
3	(Israel) Hapoel Be'er Sheva	6	1	4	1	8	5	+3	7		1–2	1–1	—	4–0
4	Austria Wien	6	0	2	4	2	15	−13	2		0–1	1–1	0–0	—

Source: UEFA

8 September 2022 Round 1	Villarreal (Spain)	4–3	(Poland) Lech Poznań	Valencia, Spain
18:45 CEST (UTC+02:00)	Chukwueze 32'; Baena 36', 40'; Coquelin 89'	Report	Skóraś 2'; Ishak 46' (pen.), 61'	Stadium: Ciutat de València (Note: Villarreal played their home matches at Estadi Ciutat de València, Valencia, instead of their regular stadium, Estadio de la Cerámica, Villarreal, due to ongoing stadium renovations.); Attendance: 10,385; Referee: Ali Palabıyık (Turkey)

15 September 2022 Round 2	Lech Poznań (Poland)	4–1	Austria Wien	Poznań, Poland
21:00 CEST (UTC+02:00)	Ishak 27'; Skóraś 64'; Velde 76', 90'	Report	Braunöder 29'	Stadium: Stadion Miejski; Attendance: 20,102; Referee: Peter Kjærsgaard (Denmark)

6 October 2022 Round 3	Lech Poznań (Poland)	0–0	(Israel) Hapoel Be'er Sheva	Poznań, Poland
18:45 CEST (UTC+02:00)		Report		Stadium: Stadion Miejski; Attendance: 17,283; Referee: Tamás Bognár (Hungary)

13 October 2022 Round 4	Hapoel Be'er Sheva (Israel)	1–1	(Poland) Lech Poznań	Be'er Sheva, Israel
21:00 CEST (UTC+02:00)	Hemed 9' (pen.)	Report	Szymczak 44'	Stadium: Turner Stadium; Attendance: 11,668; Referee: Ruddy Buquet (France)

27 October 2022 Round 5	Austria Wien	1–1	(Poland) Lech Poznań	Vienna, Austria
18:45 CEST (UTC+02:00)	Keles 69'	Report	Ishak 48'	Stadium: Franz Horr Stadium; Attendance: 12,211; Referee: Darren England (England)

3 November 2022 Round 6	Lech Poznań (Poland)	3–0	(Spain) Villarreal	Poznań, Poland
21:00 CET (UTC+01:00)	Velde 27'; Skóraś 51', 77'	Report		Stadium: Stadion Miejski; Attendance: 30,117; Referee: Nathan Verboomen (Belgium)

==== Knockout round play-offs ====
16 February 2023 First leg	Bodø/Glimt (Norway)	0–0	(Poland) Lech Poznań	Bodø, Norway
18:45 CET (UTC+01:00)		Report		Stadium: Aspmyra Stadion; Attendance: 6,925; Referee: Harald Lechner (Austria)

23 February 2023 Second leg	Lech Poznań (Poland)	1–0 (1–0 agg.)	(Norway) Bodø/Glimt	Poznań, Poland
21:00 CET (UTC+01:00)	Ishak 63'	Report		Stadium: Stadion Miejski; Attendance: 34,017; Referee: Nikola Dabanović (Montenegro)

==== Round of 16 ====
9 March 2023 First leg	Lech Poznań (Poland)	2–0	(Sweden) Djurgårdens IF	Poznań, Poland
21:00 CET (UTC+01:00)	Milić 39'; Marchwiński 82'	Report		Stadium: Stadion Miejski; Attendance: 40,222; Referee: Stéphanie Frappart (France)

16 March 2023 Second leg	Djurgårdens IF (Sweden)	0–3 (0–5 agg.)	(Poland) Lech Poznań	Stockholm, Sweden
18:45 CET (UTC+01:00)		Report	Marchwiński 77'; Kvekveskiri 90+1'; Skóraś 90+2'	Stadium: Tele2 Arena; Attendance: 25,115; Referee: Duje Strukan (Croatia)

==== Quarter-finals ====
13 April 2023 First leg	Lech Poznań (Poland)	1–4	(Italy) Fiorentina	Poznań, Poland
21:00 CEST (UTC+02:00)	Velde 20'	Report	Cabral 4'; González 41'; Bonaventura 58'; Ikoné 63'	Stadium: Stadion Miejski; Attendance: 41,609; Referee: Irfan Peljto (Bosnia and Herzegovina)

20 April 2023 Second leg	Fiorentina (Italy)	2–3 (6–4 agg.)	(Poland) Lech Poznań	Florence, Italy
18:45 CEST (UTC+02:00)	Sottil 78'; Castrovilli 90+2'	Report	Sousa 9'; Velde 65' (pen.); Sobiech 69'	Stadium: Stadio Artemio Franchi; Attendance: 23,110; Referee: Rade Obrenovič (Slovenia)

== Statistics ==
=== Appearances and goals ===
As of 27 May 2023.

No.	Pos	Player	Ekstraklasa		Polish Cup		Polish Super Cup		UEFA Champions League UEFA Europa Conference League		Total	
No.	Pos	Player	Apps	Goals	Apps	Goals	Apps	Goals	Apps	Goals	Apps	Goals
Goalkeepers
1	GK	(Ukraine) Artur Rudko	1	0	1	0	0	0	4	0	6	0
35	GK	(Poland) Filip Bednarek	32	0	0	0	1	0	16	0	49	0
77	GK	(Slovakia) Dominik Holec	1	0	0	0	0	0	0	0	1	0
Defenders
2	DF	(Portugal) Joel Pereira	24+7	0	1	0	0	0	19+1	1	52	1
3	DF	(Scotland) Barry Douglas	12+4	0	0	0	1	0	4+4	0	25	0
5	DF	(Portugal) Pedro Rebocho	17+2	0	1	0	0	0	18+1	0	39	0
15	DF	(Poland) Michał Gurgul	1+2	0	0	0	0	0	0	0	3	0
16	DF	(Croatia) Antonio Milić	22+1	1	1	0	1	0	16	1	41	2
18	DF	(Poland) Bartosz Salamon	7+3	0	0	0	0	0	3+1	0	14	0
25	DF	(Sweden) Filip Dagerstål	18+2	0	0	0	0	0	6+6	0	32	0
27	DF	(Poland) Mateusz Żukowski	0+3	0	0	0	0	0	0	0	3	0
37	DF	(Slovakia) Ľubomír Šatka	13	1	0+1	0	0	0	9	0	23	1
44	DF	(Poland) Alan Czerwiński	17+5	0	0	0	1	0	3+5	1	31	1
Midfielders
6	MF	(Sweden) Jesper Karlström	27+4	1	1	0	1	0	18+1	0	52	1
7	MF	(Portugal) Afonso Sousa	16+8	4	1	1	0+1	0	4+4	2	34	7
11	MF	(Poland) Filip Marchwiński	17+10	5	0	0	0	0	3+12	3	42	8
14	MF	(Georgia (country)) Heorhiy Tsitaishvili	7+5	1	1	0	1	0	1+9	0	24	1
21	MF	(Poland) Michał Skóraś	26+6	9	0	0	0+1	0	20	7	53	16
22	MF	(Poland) Radosław Murawski	22+9	1	0	0	1	0	15+1	0	48	1
23	MF	(Norway) Kristoffer Velde	20+10	8	1	0	0+1	0	12+4	8	48	16
24	MF	(Portugal) João Amaral	6+15	2	0	0	0	0	10+3	2	34	4
30	MF	(Georgia (country)) Nika Kvekveskiri	19+9	2	1	0	1	0	9+10	1	49	3
50	MF	(Ivory Coast) Adriel Ba Loua	8+12	0	0+1	0	1	0	1+5	0	28	0
74	MF	(Poland) Jakub Antczak	0+1	0	0	0	0	0	0	0	1	0
Forwards
9	FW	(Sweden) Mikael Ishak	20+3	11	0+1	0	0	0	18+1	9	43	20
17	FW	(Poland) Filip Szymczak	12+9	2	0	0	1	0	8+9	1	39	3
54	FW	(Poland) Filip Wilak	0+3	0	0	0	0	0	0	0	3	0
90	FW	(Poland) Artur Sobiech	5+10	3	1	0	1	0	1+6	1	24	4
Players who appeared for Lech and left the club during the season:
10	MF	(Spain) Dani Ramírez	0	0	0	0	0+1	0	0	0	1	0
20	DF	(Poland) Maksymilian Pingot	4+1	0	1	0	0+1	0	2+1	0	10	0
43	MF	(Poland) Antoni Kozubal	0	0	0	0	0	0	0+2	0	2	0

=== Goalscorers ===
As of 27 May 2023.

Place	Number	Position	Nation	Name	Ekstraklasa	Polish Cup	Polish Super Cup	UEFA Champions League UEFA Europa Conference League	Total
1	9	FW	(Sweden)	Mikael Ishak	11	0	0	9	20
2	21	MF	(Poland)	Michał Skóraś	9	0	0	7	16
2	23	MF	(Norway)	Kristoffer Velde	8	0	0	8	16
4	11	MF	(Poland)	Filip Marchwiński	5	0	0	3	8
5	7	MF	(Portugal)	Afonso Sousa	4	1	0	2	7
6	24	MF	(Portugal)	João Amaral	2	0	0	2	4
6	90	FW	(Poland)	Artur Sobiech	3	0	0	1	4
8	17	FW	(Poland)	Filip Szymczak	2	0	0	1	3
8	30	MF	(Georgia (country))	Nika Kvekveskiri	2	0	0	1	3
10	16	DF	(Croatia)	Antonio Milić	1	0	0	1	2
11	2	DF	(Portugal)	Joel Pereira	0	0	0	1	1
11	6	MF	(Sweden)	Jesper Karlström	1	0	0	0	1
11	14	MF	(Georgia (country))	Heorhiy Tsitaishvili	1	0	0	0	1
11	22	MF	(Poland)	Radosław Murawski	1	0	0	0	1
11	37	DF	(Slovakia)	Ľubomír Šatka	1	0	0	0	1
11	44	DF	(Poland)	Alan Czerwiński	0	0	0	1	1
TOTALS					51	1	0	37	89

=== Assists ===
As of 27 May 2023.

Place	Number	Position	Nation	Name	Ekstraklasa	Polish Cup	Polish Super Cup	UEFA Champions League UEFA Europa Conference League	Total
1	9	FW	(Sweden)	Mikael Ishak	6	0	0	5	11
2	2	DF	(Portugal)	Joel Pereira	2	1	0	4	7
2	23	MF	(Norway)	Kristoffer Velde	3	0	0	4	7
4	5	DF	(Portugal)	Pedro Rebocho	3	0	0	4	6
5	21	MF	(Poland)	Michał Skóraś	3	0	0	2	5
6	17	FW	(Poland)	Filip Szymczak	2	0	0	2	4
7	7	MF	(Portugal)	Afonso Sousa	2	0	0	1	3
7	11	MF	(Poland)	Filip Marchwiński	2	0	0	1	3
7	24	MF	(Portugal)	João Amaral	1	0	0	2	3
7	25	DF	(Sweden)	Filip Dagerstål	2	0	0	1	3
7	30	MF	(Georgia (country))	Nika Kvekveskiri	2	0	0	1	3
12	14	MF	(Georgia (country))	Heorhiy Tsitaishvili	1	0	0	1	2
12	22	MF	(Poland)	Radosław Murawski	2	0	0	0	2
12	44	DF	(Poland)	Alan Czerwiński	2	0	0	0	2
15	6	MF	(Sweden)	Jesper Karlström	0	0	0	1	1
15	50	MF	(Ivory Coast)	Adriel Ba Loua	0	0	0	1	1
15	90	FW	(Poland)	Artur Sobiech	1	0	0	0	1
TOTALS					34	1	0	29	64

=== Clean sheets ===
As of 27 May 2023.

Place	Number	Nation	Name	Ekstraklasa	Polish Cup	Polish Super Cup	UEFA Champions League UEFA Europa Conference League	Total
1	35	(Poland)	Filip Bednarek	16	0	0	7	23
2	1	(Ukraine)	Artur Rudko	0	0	0	2	2
3	77	(Slovakia)	Dominik Holec	0	0	0	0	0
TOTALS				16	0	0	9	25

=== Disciplinary record ===
As of 27 May 2023.

Number	Position	Nation	Name	Ekstraklasa			Polish Cup			Polish Super Cup			UEFA Champions League UEFA Europa Conference League			Total		
Number	Position	Nation	Name	Booked	(yellow card) (yellow-red card)	Sent off (straight red)	Booked	(yellow card) (yellow-red card)	Sent off (straight red)	Booked	(yellow card) (yellow-red card)	Sent off (straight red)	Booked	(yellow card) (yellow-red card)	Sent off (straight red)	Booked	(yellow card) (yellow-red card)	Sent off (straight red)
1	GK	(Ukraine)	Artur Rudko	0	0	0	0	0	0	–			0	0	0	0	0	0
2	DF	(Portugal)	Joel Pereira	4	0	0	0	0	0	–			3	0	0	7	0	0
3	DF	(Scotland)	Barry Douglas	2	1	0	–			0	0	0	1	0	0	3	1	0
5	DF	(Portugal)	Pedro Rebocho	0	0	0	0	0	0	–			3	0	0	3	0	0
6	MF	(Sweden)	Jesper Karlström	6	0	0	0	0	0	1	0	0	6	0	0	13	0	0
7	MF	(Portugal)	Afonso Sousa	3	0	0	0	0	0	0	0	0	1	0	0	4	0	0
9	FW	(Sweden)	Mikael Ishak	4	0	0	0	0	0	–			2	0	0	6	0	0
11	MF	(Poland)	Filip Marchwiński	3	0	0	–						2	0	0	5	0	0
14	MF	(Georgia (country))	Heorhiy Tsitaishvili	2	0	0	0	0	0	1	0	0	0	0	0	3	0	0
15	DF	(Poland)	Michał Gurgul	1	0	0	–									1	0	0
16	DF	(Croatia)	Antonio Milić	2	0	0	0	0	0	0	0	0	2	0	1	4	0	1
17	FW	(Poland)	Filip Szymczak	3	0	0	–			0	0	0	3	0	0	6	0	0
18	DF	(Poland)	Bartosz Salamon	2	0	0	–						1	0	0	3	0	0
21	MF	(Poland)	Michał Skóraś	6	0	0	–			0	0	0	2	0	0	8	0	0
22	MF	(Poland)	Radosław Murawski	6	0	1	–			0	0	0	7	0	0	13	0	1
23	MF	(Norway)	Kristoffer Velde	6	0	0	0	0	0	0	0	0	2	0	0	8	0	0
24	MF	(Portugal)	João Amaral	1	0	0	–						0	0	0	1	0	0
25	DF	(Sweden)	Filip Dagerstål	1	0	0	–						0	0	0	1	0	0
27	DF	(Poland)	Mateusz Żukowski	0	0	0	–									0	0	0
30	MF	(Georgia (country))	Nika Kvekveskiri	7	0	0	0	0	0	1	0	0	2	0	0	10	0	0
35	GK	(Poland)	Filip Bednarek	2	0	0	–			0	0	0	1	0	0	3	0	0
37	DF	(Slovakia)	Ľubomír Šatka	1	0	0	0	0	0	–			0	0	0	1	0	0
44	DF	(Poland)	Alan Czerwiński	4	0	0	–			0	0	0	2	0	0	6	0	0
50	MF	(Ivory Coast)	Adriel Ba Loua	3	0	0	0	0	0	0	0	0	0	0	0	3	0	0
54	FW	(Poland)	Filip Wilak	0	0	0	–									0	0	0
74	MF	(Poland)	Jakub Antczak	0	0	0	–									0	0	0
77	GK	(Slovakia)	Dominik Holec	0	0	0	–									0	0	0
90	FW	(Poland)	Artur Sobiech	2	0	0	0	0	0	0	0	0	2	0	0	4	0	0
Players who appeared for Lech and left the club during the season:
10	MF	(Spain)	Dani Ramírez	–						1	0	0	–			1	0	0
20	DF	(Poland)	Maksymilian Pingot	1	0	0	1	0	0	0	0	0	0	0	0	2	0	0
43	MF	(Poland)	Antoni Kozubal	–									0	0	0	0	0	0
TOTALS				72	1	1	1	0	0	4	0	0	42	0	1	119	1	2

=== Home attendances ===
As of 27 May 2023.

	Matches	Total attendances	Average attendance	Highest attendance	Lowest attendance
Ekstraklasa	17	352,516	20,736	39,123	10,820
Polish Cup	1	6,854	6,854	6,854	6,854
Polish Super Cup	1	15,898	15,898	15,898	15,898
UEFA Champions League; UEFA Europa Conference League	10	239,284	23,928	41,609	9,111
Total	29	614,552	21,191	41,609	6,854
