= 2023–24 Lech Poznań season =

Lech Poznań
2023–24 season
- Chairman: Karol Klimczak; Since 1 November 2011; Piotr Rutkowski; Since 27 January 2021
- Manager: Mariusz Rumak; Since 17 December 2023; John van den Brom; 19 June 2022 - 17 December 2023
- Stadium: Enea Stadion
- Ekstraklasa: 5th
- Polish Cup: Quarter-finals
- UEFA Europa Conference League: Third qualifying round
- Top goalscorer: League: Mikael Ishak (11 goals); All: Kristoffer Velde (13 goals)
- Highest home attendance: Ekstraklasa: 40,362 vs. Cracovia (28 April 2024)
- Lowest home attendance: Ekstraklasa: 14,104 vs. Piast (10 December 2023)
- Average home league attendance: 24,760
- Biggest win: Polish Cup: Zawisza 0–4 Lech (31 October 2023)
- Biggest defeat: Ekstraklasa: Pogoń 5–0 Lech (1 October 2023)
Home colours	Away colours	Third colours

The 2023–24 season is Lech Poznań's 102nd season in existence and the club's 22nd consecutive season in the top flight of Polish football. In addition to the domestic league, Lech Poznań participates in this season's edition of the Polish Cup and the UEFA Europa Conference League. The season covers the period from 1 July 2023 to 30 June 2024.

Lech Poznań plays their official home matches at the Stadion Miejski branded on 24 July 2023 as Enea Stadion for sponsorship reasons for four next seasons.

== Club ==
=== Coaching staff ===
Position	Staff
Coach	(Poland) Mariusz Rumak (since 17 December 2023)
Assistant coach	(Poland) Rafał Janas (since 29 December 2023)
Assistant coach	(Poland) Grzegorz Wojtkowiak (since 29 December 2023)
Assistant coach	(Poland) Dariusz Dudka
Assistant coach	(Poland) Hubert Wędzonka
Goalkeeping coach	(Poland) Maciej Borowski
Fitness coach	(Czech Republic) Antonin Čepek
Fitness coach	(Poland) Karol Kikut
Match analyst	(Poland) Hubert Barański
Team Doctor	(Poland) Krzysztof Pawlaczyk
Team Doctor	(Poland) Jakub Stefaniak
Team Doctor	(Poland) Tomasz Jaśkowiak
Physiotherapist	(Poland) Maciej Łopatka
Physiotherapist	(Poland) Marcin Lis
Physiotherapist	(Poland) Maciej Smuniewski
Dietician	(Poland) Patryk Wiśniewski
Team Manager	(Poland) Mariusz Skrzypczak
Kit Manager	(Poland) Sławomir Mizgalski
Head of the Scientific Department	(Poland) Bartłomiej Grzelak
Cook	(Poland) Artur Dzierzbicki
Past members
Coach	(Netherlands) John van den Brom (until 17 December 2023)
Assistant coach	(Netherlands) Denny Landzaat (until 17 December 2023)
Assistant coach	(Poland) Maciej Kędziorek (until 29 November 2023)
Team Doctor	(Poland) Damian Bartkiewicz

Source: Lech Poznań

=== Management ===
Position	Staff
Chairman	(Poland) Karol Klimczak
Chairman	(Poland) Piotr Rutkowski
Sporting director	(Poland) Tomasz Rząsa

Source: Lech Poznań

== Current squad ==
As of 4 February 2024

Note: Flags indicate national team as defined under FIFA eligibility rules; some limited exceptions apply. Players may hold more than one non-FIFA nationality.

No.	Pos.	Nation	Player
2	DF	POR	Joel Pereira
3	DF	SCO	Barry Douglas
5	DF	SWE	Elias Andersson
6	MF	SWE	Jesper Karlström (3rd captain)
7	MF	POR	Afonso Sousa
8	MF	IRN	Ali Gholizadeh
9	FW	SWE	Mikael Ishak (captain)
10	MF	POL	Filip Marchwiński
11	MF	NOR	Kristoffer Velde
15	DF	POL	Michał Gurgul
16	DF	CRO	Antonio Milić
17	FW	POL	Filip Szymczak
18	DF	POL	Bartosz Salamon
19	MF	POL	Maksymilian Dziuba

No.	Pos.	Nation	Player
20	DF	POL	Bartosz Tomaszewski
21	MF	BIH	Dino Hotić
22	MF	POL	Radosław Murawski (Vice-captain)
23	DF	SVN	Miha Blažič
25	DF	SWE	Filip Dagerstål
30	MF	GEO	Nika Kvekveskiri
31	GK	POL	Mateusz Mędrala
33	GK	POL	Mateusz Pruchniewski
35	GK	POL	Filip Bednarek
41	GK	POL	Bartosz Mrozek
44	DF	POL	Alan Czerwiński
50	MF	CIV	Adriel Ba Loua
56	MF	POL	Kornel Lisman
90	FW	POL	Artur Sobiech

=== Out on loan ===
Note: Flags indicate national team as defined under FIFA eligibility rules; some limited exceptions apply. Players may hold more than one non-FIFA nationality.

No.	Pos.	Nation	Player
28	DF	POL	Filip Borowski (at Warta Poznań until 30 June 2024)
43	MF	POL	Antoni Kozubal (at GKS Katowice until 30 June 2024)
54	MF	POL	Filip Wilak (at Ruch Chorzów until 30 June 2024)

No.	Pos.	Nation	Player
55	DF	POL	Maksymilian Pingot (at Stal Mielec until 30 June 2025)
74	MF	POL	Jakub Antczak (at Odra Opole until 30 June 2024)
—	GK	POL	Krzysztof Bąkowski (at Polonia Warsaw until 30 June 2024)

== Transfer ==
=== Summer transfer window ===
==== In ====
No.	Pos.	Nat.	Name	Age	EU	Moving from	Type	Transfer window	Ends	Transfer fee	Source
5	DF	(Sweden)	Elias Andersson	27	EU	(Sweden) Djurgårdens IF	Transfer	Summer	2026	€400,000	
31	GK	(Poland)	Krzysztof Bąkowski	20	EU	Stal Rzeszów	Loan return	Summer	2024	Free	
23	DF	(Slovenia)	Miha Blažič	30	EU	(France) Angers	Transfer	Summer	2025	Free	
28	DF	(Poland)	Filip Borowski	19	EU	Zagłębie Sosnowiec	Loan return	Summer	2023	Free	
25	MF	(Sweden)	Filip Dagerstål	26	EU	(Russia) Khimki	Transfer	Summer	2026	Free	
19	MF	(Poland)	Maksymilian Dziuba	18	EU		Transfer	Summer	2026	Youth system	
8	MF	(Iran)	Ali Gholizadeh	27	Non-EU	(Belgium) Charleroi	Transfer	Summer	2026	€1,800,000	
21	MF	(Bosnia and Herzegovina)	Dino Hotić	27	EU	(Belgium) Cercle Brugge	Transfer	Summer	2026	Free	
31	GK	(Poland)	Mateusz Mędrala	17	EU		Transfer	Summer	2026	Youth system	
41	GK	(Poland)	Bartosz Mrozek	23	EU	Stal Mielec	Loan return	Summer	2024	Free	
	DF	(Poland)	Krystian Palacz	19	EU	Sandecja Nowy Sącz	Loan return	Summer	2024	Free	
55	DF	(Poland)	Maksymilian Pingot	20	EU	Odra Opole	Loan return	Summer	2024	Free	
33	GK	(Poland)	Mateusz Pruchniewski	16	EU		Transfer	Summer	2025	Youth system	
53	MF	(Poland)	Aleksander Nadolski	18	EU		Transfer	Summer	2025	Youth system	
20	DF	(Poland)	Bartosz Tomaszewski	18	EU		Transfer	Summer	2025	Youth system	

Total spending: ▼€2,200,000

==== Out ====
No.	Pos.	Nat.	Name	Age	EU	Moving to	Type	Transfer window	Transfer fee	Source
24	MF	(Portugal)	João Amaral	31	EU	(Turkey) Kocaelispor	Transfer	Summer	Undisclosed	
74	MF	(Poland)	Jakub Antczak	19	EU	Odra Opole	Loan	Summer	Free	
31	GK	(Poland)	Krzysztof Bąkowski	20	EU	Radomiak Radom	Loan	Summer	Free	
28	DF	(Poland)	Filip Borowski	19	EU	Warta Poznań	Loan	Summer	Free	
25	MF	(Sweden)	Filip Dagerstål	26	EU	(Russia) Khimki	Loan return	Summer	Free	
77	GK	(Slovakia)	Dominik Holec	28	EU	(Czech Republic) Sparta Prague	Loan return	Summer	Free	
	DF	(Poland)	Krystian Palacz	19	EU	Motor Lublin	Transfer	Summer	Undisclosed	
5	DF	(Portugal)	Pedro Rebocho	28	EU	(Saudi Arabia) Khaleej	End of contract	Summer	Free	
1	GK	(Ukraine)	Artur Rudko	31	Non-EU	(Ukraine) Metalist Kharkiv	Loan return	Summer	Free	
37	DF	(Slovakia)	Ľubomír Šatka	27	EU	(Turkey) Samsunspor	End of contract	Summer	Free	
21	MF	(Poland)	Michał Skóraś	23	EU	(Belgium) Club Brugge	Transfer	Summer	€6,000,000	
14	MF	(Georgia (country)) (Ukraine)	Heorhiy Tsitaishvili	22	Non-EU	(Ukraine) Dynamo Kyiv	Loan return	Summer	Free	
27	DF	(Poland)	Mateusz Żukowski	21	EU	(Scotland) Rangers	Loan return	Summer	Free	

Total income: ▲€6,000,000

Total expenditure: ▲€3,800,000

=== Winter transfer window ===
==== In ====
No.	Pos.	Nat.	Name	Age	EU	Moving from	Type	Transfer window	Ends	Transfer fee	Source
31	GK	(Poland)	Krzysztof Bąkowski	20	EU	Radomiak Radom	Loan return	Winter	2024	Free	
56	MF	(Poland)	Kornel Lisman	17	EU		Transfer	Winter	2025	Youth system	

Total spending: €0

==== Out ====
No.	Pos.	Nat.	Name	Age	EU	Moving to	Type	Transfer window	Transfer fee	Source
31	GK	(Poland)	Krzysztof Bąkowski	20	EU	Polonia Warsaw	Loan	Winter	Free	
55	DF	(Poland)	Maksymilian Pingot	20	EU	Stal Mielec	Loan	Winter	Free	
54	MF	(Poland)	Filip Wilak	20	EU	Ruch Chorzów	Loan	Winter	Free	

Total income: €0

Total expenditure: €0

== Friendlies ==
Win Draw Loss

1 July 2023 Club friendly	Lech Poznań	1–3	(Czech Republic) Slovan Liberec	Poznań
11:00 CEST (UTC+02:00)	Nadolski 55'	90minut Official website	Chaluš 34'; Horský 72'; Rabušic 84'	Stadium: Lech Poznań training ground Attendance: 0 Referee: Szymon Lizak (Poznań)

8 July 2023 Club friendly	Lech Poznań	1–1	(Czech Republic) Baník Ostrava	Opalenica
11:00 CEST (UTC+02:00)	Ba Loua 41'	90minut Official website	Šín 89'	Stadium: Stadion Miejski

15 July 2023 Club friendly	AZ Alkmaar (Netherlands)	4–0	Lech Poznań	Alkmaar
15:00 CEST (UTC+02:00)	Pavlidis 20'; Lahdo 76', 90'; Pingot 81' (o.g.)	90minut Official website		Stadium: AZ Alkmaar training ground Referee: Jannick van der Laan

12 October 2023 Club friendly	Lech Poznań	3–2	Miedź Legnica	Poznań
13:00 CEST (UTC+02:00)	Sousa 33'; Wilak 49'; Ishak 70'	90minut Official website	Lehaire 40', 60'	Stadium: Lech Poznań training ground Attendance: 0

16 November 2023 Club friendly	Lech Poznań	0–3	Warta Poznań	Poznań
11:00 CET (UTC+01:00)		90minut Official website	Pleśnierowicz 23'; Vizinger 58'; Kamiński 88'	Stadium: Lech Poznań training ground Attendance: 0

18 January 2024 Club friendly	Lech Poznań	0–3	(Austria) LASK	Belek, Turkey
15:00 CET (UTC+01:00)		90minut Official website	Usor 17', 44'; Pintor 77'	Stadium: Calista Sports Center

25 January 2024 Club friendly	Lech Poznań	3–0	(Slovenia) Maribor	Belek, Turkey
12:00 CET (UTC+01:00)	Szymczak 10', 24'; Milić 54'	90minut Official website		Stadium: Calista Sports Center

25 January 2024 Club friendly	Lech Poznań	1–3	(Ukraine) Shakhtar Donetsk	Antalya, Turkey
16:00 CET (UTC+01:00)	Gurgul 67'	90minut Official website	Zubkov 21'; Bondarenko 42'; Tsukanov 55' (pen.)	Stadium: Mardan Sports Complex

31 January 2024 Club friendly	Lech Poznań	5–1	Lech II Poznań	Poznań
	Sousa; Karlström; Ba Loua; Kvekveskiri; Dziuba	90minut Official website	Stankiewicz	Stadium: Lech Poznań training ground Attendance: 0

3 February 2024 Club friendly	Lech Poznań	4–0	Wisła Płock	Poznań
13:00 CET (UTC+01:00)	Szymczak; Velde	90minut X		Stadium: Lech Poznań training ground Attendance: 0

23 March 2024 Club friendly	Lech Poznań	1–0	Chrobry Głogów	Poznań
11:00 CET (UTC+01:00)	Pietrzak 64'	90minut Official website		Stadium: Lech Poznań training ground Attendance: 0

== Competitions ==
Win Draw Loss

=== Overview ===
Competition	First match	Last match	Starting round	Final position	Record							
Competition	First match	Last match	Starting round	Final position	Pld	W	D	L	GF	GA	GD	Win %
Ekstraklasa	22 July 2023	25 May 2024	Matchday 1	5th	34	14	11	9	47	41	+6	41.18
Polish Cup	31 October 2023	27 February 2024	Round of 32	Quarter-finals	3	2	0	1	5	1	+4	66.67
UEFA Europa Conference League	27 July 2023	17 August 2023	Second qualifying round	Third qualifying round	4	3	0	1	8	6	+2	75.00
Total					41	19	11	11	60	48	+12	46.34

Source: Competitions

=== Ekstraklasa ===
==== League table ====
Pos	Team	Pld	W	D	L	GF	GA	GD	Pts	Qualification or relegation
3	Legia Warsaw	34	16	11	7	51	39	+12	59	Qualification for the Conference League second qualifying round
4	Pogoń Szczecin	34	16	7	11	59	38	+21	55	
5	Lech Poznań	34	14	11	9	47	41	+6	53	
6	Górnik Zabrze	34	15	8	11	45	41	+4	53	
7	Raków Częstochowa	34	14	10	10	54	39	+15	52	

Source: ekstraklasa.org 90minut.pl
Rules for classification: 1) Points; 2) Head-to-head points; 3) Head-to-head goal difference; 4) Goal difference; 5) Goals scored; 6) Number of wins; 7) Number of away wins; 8) Lower number of points based on yellow and red cards (red card = 3 points, yellow card = 1 point, sending-off = 3 points - including 1 point for first yellow card); 9) Fairplay ranking; 10) Draw.
(Note: Head-to-head record is used only after all the matches between the teams in question have been played)

==== Results summary ====
Overall								Home						Away					
Pld	W	D	L	GF	GA	GD	Pts	W	D	L	GF	GA	GD	W	D	L	GF	GA	GD
34	14	11	9	47	41	+6	53	9	4	4	29	16	+13	5	7	5	18	25	−7

Source: Ekstraklasa 90minut.pl

==== Results by round ====
Round	1	2	3	4	5	6	7	8	9	10	11	12	13	14	15	16	17	18	19	20	21	22	23	24	25	26	27	28	29	30	31	32	33	34
Ground	A	H	A	H	A	H	H	A	H	A	H	H	A	H	A	H	A	H	A	H	A	H	A	A	H	A	H	A	A	H	A	H	A	H
Result	W	W	D	D	L	W	D	W	W	L	W	W	D	W	D	L	W	L	D	W	W	D	L	D	W	D	W	L	W	D	L	L	D	L
Position	5	1	1	2	7	9	10	7	6	6	5	3	3	3	3	3	3	3	3	3	3	3	4	3	4	4	3	3	3	2	3	5	4	5

Source: Ekstraklasa 90minut.pl
A = Away; H = Home; W = Win; D = Draw; L = Loss; P = Postponed

==== Matches ====
Win Draw Loss

22 July 2023 Match 1	Piast Gliwice	1–2	Lech Poznań	Gliwice
20:00 CEST (UTC+02:00)	Dziczek 43' (pen.)	Ekstraklasa; 90minut	Marchwiński 46', 54'	Stadium: Stadion Miejski im. Piotra Wieczorka; Attendance: 5,784; Referee: Szymon Marciniak (Płock)

30 July 2023 Match 2	Lech Poznań	2–0	Radomiak Radom	Poznań
17:30 CEST (UTC+02:00)	Ishak 40'; Szymczak 84'	Ekstraklasa; 90minut		Stadium: Enea Stadion; Attendance: 23,198; Referee: Daniel Stefański (Bydgoszcz)

6 August 2023 Match 3	Zagłębie Lubin	1–1	Lech Poznań	Lubin
17:30 CEST (UTC+02:00)	Kurminowski 41'	Ekstraklasa; 90minut	Blažič 76'	Stadium: Stadion Miejski; Attendance: 15,813; Referee: Damian Kos (Gdańsk)

20 August 2023 Match 5	Śląsk Wrocław	3–1	Lech Poznań	Wrocław
17:30 CEST (UTC+02:00)	Expósito 37', 73'; Szwedzik 90+2'	Ekstraklasa; 90minut	Velde 51' (pen.)	Stadium: Tarczyński Arena Wrocław; Attendance: 20,045; Referee: Szymon Marciniak (Płock)

2 September 2023 Match 7	Lech Poznań	1–1	Górnik Zabrze	Poznań
20:00 CEST (UTC+02:00)	Czerwiński 70'	Ekstraklasa; 90minut	Yokota 45' (pen.)	Stadium: Enea Stadion; Attendance: 22,047; Referee: Damian Sylwestrzak (Wrocław)

17 September 2023 Match 8	Warta Poznań	0–2	Lech Poznań	Poznań
17:30 CEST (UTC+02:00)		Ekstraklasa; 90minut	Marchwiński 28'; Dagerstål 81'	Stadium: Enea Stadion; Attendance: 28,419; Referee: Szymon Marciniak (Płock)

23 September 2023 Match 9	Lech Poznań	2–1	Stal Mielec	Poznań
20:00 CEST (UTC+02:00)	Velde 37'; Marchwiński 40'	Ekstraklasa; 90minut	Domański 23'	Stadium: Enea Stadion; Attendance: 15,527; Referee: Karol Arys (Szczecin)

28 September 2023 Match 6	Lech Poznań	4–1	Raków Częstochowa	Poznań
20:00 CEST (UTC+02:00)	Gurgul 7'; Marchwiński 25'; Velde 72'; Ba Loua 90+3'	Ekstraklasa; 90minut	Sorescu 2'	Stadium: Enea Stadion; Attendance: 21,874; Referee: Szymon Marciniak (Płock)
Note: Game originally scheduled on 27 August 2023 has been postponed at Raków Częstochowa's request.

1 October 2023 Match 10	Pogoń Szczecin	5–0	Lech Poznań	Szczecin
17:30 CEST (UTC+02:00)	Ulvestad 17'; Gorgon 33'; Bichakhchyan 39'; Grosicki 47'; Fornalczyk 90+3'	Ekstraklasa; 90minut		Stadium: Stadion Miejski im. Floriana Krygiera; Attendance: 20,157; Referee: Damian Sylwestrzak (Wrocław)

6 October 2023 Match 11	Lech Poznań	4–1	Puszcza Niepołomice	Poznań
20:30 CEST (UTC+02:00)	Ba Loua 2'; Karlström 43'; Ishak 51'; Milić 90+5'	Ekstraklasa; 90minut	Zapolnik 4'	Stadium: Enea Stadion; Attendance: 25,755; Referee: Łukasz Kuźma (Białystok)

21 October 2023 Match 12	Lech Poznań	3–1	ŁKS Łódź	Poznań
20:00 CEST (UTC+02:00)	Ishak 18', 44'; Velde 81'	Ekstraklasa; 90minut	Jurić 64'	Stadium: Enea Stadion; Attendance: 25,026; Referee: Damian Kos (Gdańsk)

24 October 2023 Match 4	Lech Poznań	3–3	Jagiellonia Białystok	Poznań
18:00 CEST (UTC+02:00)	Ba Loua 3', 51'; Ishak 43'	Ekstraklasa; 90minut	Hansen 54'; Skrzypczak 66'; Wdowik 90+6' (pen.)	Stadium: Enea Stadion; Attendance: 15,372; Referee: Damian Sylwestrzak (Wrocław)
Note: Game originally scheduled on 13 August 2023 has been postponed at Lech Poznań's request.

28 October 2023 Match 13	Cracovia	1–1	Lech Poznań	Kraków
17:30 CEST (UTC+02:00)	Ghiță 80'	Ekstraklasa; 90minut	Velde 45+1'	Stadium: Stadion Cracovii im. Józefa Piłsudskiego; Attendance: 10,082; Referee: Łukasz Kuźma (Białystok)

4 November 2023 Match 14	Lech Poznań	2–0	Ruch Chorzów	Poznań
20:00 CET (UTC+01:00)	Ishak 36'; Velde 53'	Ekstraklasa; 90minut		Stadium: Enea Stadion; Attendance: 24,086; Referee: Krzysztof Jakubik (Siedlce)

12 November 2023 Match 15	Legia Warsaw	0–0	Lech Poznań	Warsaw
17:30 CET (UTC+01:00)		Ekstraklasa; 90minut		Stadium: Stadion Wojska Polskiego; Attendance: 29,028; Referee: Piotr Lasyk (Bytom)

26 November 2023 Match 16	Lech Poznań	1–3	Widzew Łódź	Poznań
17:30 CET (UTC+01:00)	Karlström 88'	Ekstraklasa; 90minut	Álvarez 16'; Klimek 90+3'; Pawłowski 90+6'	Stadium: Enea Stadion; Attendance: 25,811; Referee: Damian Sylwestrzak (Wrocław)

2 December 2023 Match 17	Korona Kielce	0–1	Lech Poznań	Kielce
20:00 CET (UTC+01:00)		Ekstraklasa; 90minut	Velde 86'	Stadium: Stadion Miejski; Attendance: 8,763; Referee: Bartosz Frankowski (Toruń)

10 December 2023 Match 18	Lech Poznań	0–1	Piast Gliwice	Poznań
12:30 CET (UTC+01:00)		Ekstraklasa; 90minut	Dziczek 86' (pen.)	Stadium: Enea Stadion; Attendance: 14,104; Referee: Karol Arys (Szczecin)

16 December 2023 Match 19	Radomiak Radom	2–2	Lech Poznań	Radom
20:00 CET (UTC+01:00)	Abramowicz 79'; Rocha 90+5'	Ekstraklasa; 90minut	Kvekveskiri 30'; Pereira 50'	Stadium: Stadion Lekkoatletyczno-Piłkarski; Attendance: 6,006; Referee: Daniel Stefański (Bydgoszcz)

10 February 2024 Match 20	Lech Poznań	2–0	Zagłębie Lubin	Poznań
20:00 CET (UTC+01:00)	Szymczak 3'; Murawski 72'	Ekstraklasa; 90minut		Stadium: Enea Stadion; Attendance: 18,256; Referee: Daniel Stefański (Bydgoszcz)

17 February 2024 Match 21	Jagiellonia Białystok	1–2	Lech Poznań	Białystok
17:30 CET (UTC+01:00)	Hansen 82'	Ekstraklasa; 90minut	Marchwiński 18'; Szymczak 30' (pen.)	Stadium: Stadion Miejski; Attendance: 17,141; Referee: Damian Sylwestrzak (Wrocław)

24 February 2024 Match 22	Lech Poznań	0–0	Śląsk Wrocław	Poznań
17:30 CET (UTC+01:00)		Ekstraklasa; 90minut		Stadium: Enea Stadion; Attendance: 32,568; Referee: Piotr Lasyk (Bytom)

3 March 2024 Match 23	Raków Częstochowa	4–0	Lech Poznań	Częstochowa
17:30 CET (UTC+01:00)	Nowak 14'; Berggren 25', 36'; Mrozek 69' (o.g.)	Ekstraklasa; 90minut		Stadium: Miejski Stadion Piłkarski "Raków"; Attendance: 5,500; Referee: Szymon Marciniak (Płock)

9 March 2024 Match 24	Górnik Zabrze	0–0	Lech Poznań	Zabrze
20:00 CET (UTC+01:00)		Ekstraklasa; 90minut		Stadium: Stadion im. Ernesta Pohla; Attendance: 21,474; Referee: Tomasz Musiał (Kraków)

15 March 2024 Match 25	Lech Poznań	2–0	Warta Poznań	Poznań
20:30 CET (UTC+01:00)	Velde 52', 80'	Ekstraklasa; 90minut		Stadium: Enea Stadion; Attendance: 23,361; Referee: Krzysztof Jakubik (Siedlce)

1 April 2024 Match 26	Stal Mielec	0–0	Lech Poznań	Mielec
15:00 CEST (UTC+02:00)		Ekstraklasa; 90minut		Stadium: Stadion Miejski; Attendance: 6,501; Referee: Daniel Stefański (Bydgoszcz)

7 April 2024 Match 27	Lech Poznań	1–0	Pogoń Szczecin	Poznań
15:00 CEST (UTC+02:00)	Ishak 77'	Ekstraklasa; 90minut		Stadium: Enea Stadion; Attendance: 34,207; Referee: Piotr Lasyk (Bytom)

13 April 2024 Match 28	Puszcza Niepołomice	2–1	Lech Poznań	Kraków
17:30 CEST (UTC+02:00)	Majchrzak 7'; Crăciun 23'	Ekstraklasa; 90minut	Ishak 87'	Stadium: Stadion Cracovii im. Józefa Piłsudskiego; Attendance: 3,410; Referee: Bartosz Frankowski (Toruń)

21 April 2024 Match 29	ŁKS Łódź	2–3	Lech Poznań	Łódź
15:00 CEST (UTC+02:00)	Tejan 60' (pen.); Jurić 86'	Ekstraklasa; 90minut	Ishak 36'; Marchwiński 56', 90+1'	Stadium: Stadion Miejski im. Władysława Króla; Attendance: 15,132; Referee: Damian Sylwestrzak (Wrocław)

28 April 2024 Match 30	Lech Poznań	0–0	Cracovia	Poznań
17:30 CEST (UTC+02:00)		Ekstraklasa; 90minut		Stadium: Enea Stadion; Attendance: 40,362; Referee: Jarosław Przybył (Kluczbork)

3 May 2024 Match 31	Ruch Chorzów	2–1	Lech Poznań	Chorzów
20:30 CEST (UTC+02:00)	Szczepan 24'; Feliks 84'	Ekstraklasa; 90minut	Ishak 27' (pen.)	Stadium: Stadion Śląski; Attendance: 14,718; Referee: Tomasz Musiał (Kraków)

12 May 2024 Match 32	Lech Poznań	1–2	Legia Warsaw	Poznań
17:30 CEST (UTC+02:00)	Pereira 83'	Ekstraklasa; 90minut	Blažič 15' (o.g.); Salamon 45' (o.g.)	Stadium: Enea Stadion; Attendance: 40,278; Referee: Szymon Marciniak (Płock)

19 May 2024 Match 33	Widzew Łódź	1–1	Lech Poznań	Łódź
17:30 CEST (UTC+02:00)	Rondić 43' (pen.)	Ekstraklasa; 90minut	Velde 21'	Stadium: Stadion Miejski Widzewa; Attendance: 17,879; Referee: Piotr Lasyk (Bytom)

25 May 2024 Match 34	Lech Poznań	1–2	Korona Kielce	Poznań
17:30 CEST (UTC+02:00)	Ishak 45+3'	Ekstraklasa; 90minut	Shikavka 56', 65'	Stadium: Enea Stadion; Attendance: 20,653; Referee: Daniel Stefański (Bydgoszcz)

=== Polish Cup ===
31 October 2023 Round of 32	Zawisza Bydgoszcz	0–4	Lech Poznań	Bydgoszcz
21:00 CET (UTC+01:00)		Łączy nas piłka 90minut	Szymczak 24'; Velde 42'; Wilak 64', 70'	Stadium: Stadion Miejski im. Zdzisława Krzyszkowiaka; Attendance: 13,800; Referee: Paweł Malec (Łódź)

7 December 2023 Round of 16	Arka Gdynia	0–1	Lech Poznań	Gdynia
21:00 CET (UTC+01:00)		Łączy nas piłka 90minut	Marchwiński 45'	Stadium: Stadion Miejski; Attendance: 6,120; Referee: Krzysztof Jakubik (Siedlce)

27 February 2024 Quarter-finals	Lech Poznań	0–1 (a.e.t.)	Pogoń Szczecin	Poznań
20:30 CET (UTC+01:00)		Łączy nas piłka 90minut	Gamboa 119'	Stadium: Enea Stadion; Attendance: 17,434; Referee: Bartosz Frankowski (Toruń)

=== UEFA Europa Conference League ===
==== Second qualifying round ====
27 July 2023 First leg	Lech Poznań (Poland)	3–1	(Lithuania) Kauno Žalgiris	Poznań, Poland
20:30 CEST (UTC+02:00)	Hotić 11'; Milić 41'; Murawski 45+2'	Report	Fase 57'	Stadium: Enea Stadion; Attendance: 26,157; Referee: Luka Bilbija (Bosnia and Herzegovina)

3 August 2023 Second leg	Kauno Žalgiris (Lithuania)	1–2 (2–5 agg.)	(Poland) Lech Poznań	Kaunas, Lithuania
18:00 CEST (UTC+02:00)	Uzėla 90+5'	Report	Marchwiński 14'; Ba Loua 90+2'	Stadium: Darius and Girėnas Stadium; Attendance: 5,180; Referee: Mads-Kristoffer Kristoffersen (Denmark)

==== Third qualifying round ====
10 August 2023 First leg	Lech Poznań (Poland)	2–1	(Slovakia) Spartak Trnava	Poznań, Poland
20:00 CEST (UTC+02:00)	Marchwiński 46'; Velde 63'	Report	Štetina 87'	Stadium: Enea Stadion; Attendance: 29,122; Referee: Atilla Karaoğlan (Turkey)

17 August 2023 Second leg	Spartak Trnava (Slovakia)	3–1 (4–3 agg.)	(Poland) Lech Poznań	Trnava, Slovakia
20:00 CEST (UTC+02:00)	Ofori 37'; Daniel 50'; Štetina 74'	Report	Velde 63'	Stadium: Anton Malatinský Stadium; Attendance: 16,708; Referee: César Soto Grado (Spain)

== Statistics ==
=== Appearances and goals ===
As of 25 May 2024.

No.	Pos	Player	Ekstraklasa		Polish Cup		UEFA Europa Conference League		Total	
No.	Pos	Player	Apps	Goals	Apps	Goals	Apps	Goals	Apps	Goals
Goalkeepers
31	GK	(Poland) Mateusz Mędrala	0	0	0	0	0	0	0	0
33	GK	(Poland) Mateusz Pruchniewski	0	0	0	0	0	0	0	0
35	GK	(Poland) Filip Bednarek	3	0	3	0	3	0	9	0
41	GK	(Poland) Bartosz Mrozek	31	0	0	0	1	0	32	0
Defenders
2	DF	(Portugal) Joel Pereira	24+8	2	3	0	4	0	39	2
3	DF	(Scotland) Barry Douglas	10+5	0	2+1	0	1+1	0	20	0
5	DF	(Sweden) Elias Andersson	16+7	0	1	0	3	0	27	0
15	DF	(Poland) Michał Gurgul	7+3	1	0	0	0+1	0	11	1
16	DF	(Croatia) Antonio Milić	24+2	1	2	0	4	1	32	2
18	DF	(Poland) Bartosz Salamon	15	0	1	0	0	0	16	0
20	DF	(Poland) Bartosz Tomaszewski	0	0	0	0	0	0	0	0
23	DF	(Slovenia) Miha Blažič	22+2	1	2	0	4	0	30	1
25	DF	(Sweden) Filip Dagerstål	6+1	1	0	0	0+1	0	8	1
44	DF	(Poland) Alan Czerwiński	15+12	1	0+1	0	0+2	0	30	1
Midfielders
6	MF	(Sweden) Jesper Karlström	27+3	2	2	0	3+1	0	36	2
7	MF	(Portugal) Afonso Sousa	15+3	0	0+1	0	2+2	0	23	0
8	MF	(Iran) Ali Gholizadeh	7+3	0	0+2	0	0	0	12	0
10	MF	(Poland) Filip Marchwiński	25+3	8	2+1	1	4	2	35	11
11	MF	(Norway) Kristoffer Velde	30+3	10	3	1	3	2	39	13
19	MF	(Poland) Maksymilian Dziuba	0+3	0	1+1	0	0	0	5	0
21	MF	(Bosnia and Herzegovina) Dino Hotić	8+8	0	2	0	3+1	1	22	1
22	MF	(Poland) Radosław Murawski	29+1	1	2+1	0	3	1	36	2
30	MF	(Georgia (country)) Nika Kvekveskiri	9+13	1	2+1	0	0+1	0	26	1
50	MF	(Ivory Coast) Adriel Ba Loua	16+9	4	0+1	0	0+1	1	27	5
53	MF	(Poland) Aleksander Nadolski	0	0	0	0	0	0	0	0
56	MF	(Poland) Kornel Lisman	0	0	0	0	0	0	0	0
Forwards
9	FW	(Sweden) Mikael Ishak	21+3	11	1	0	2+1	0	28	11
17	FW	(Poland) Filip Szymczak	14+16	3	2	1	2+2	0	36	4
74	FW	(Poland) Norbert Pacławski	0	0	0+1	0	0	0	1	0
90	FW	(Poland) Artur Sobiech	0+11	0	0+1	0	1+2	0	15	0
Players who appeared for Lech and left the club during the season:
54	MF	(Poland) Filip Wilak	0+7	0	1+1	2	1+1	0	11	2
55	DF	(Poland) Maksymilian Pingot	0+2	0	1	0	0+1	0	4	0

=== Goalscorers ===
As of 25 May 2024.

Place	Number	Position	Nation	Name	Ekstraklasa	Polish Cup	UEFA Europa Conference League	Total
1	11	MF	(Norway)	Kristoffer Velde	10	1	2	13
2	9	FW	(Sweden)	Mikael Ishak	11	0	0	11
2	10	MF	(Poland)	Filip Marchwiński	8	1	2	11
4	50	MF	(Ivory Coast)	Adriel Ba Loua	4	0	1	5
5	17	FW	(Poland)	Filip Szymczak	3	1	0	4
6	2	DF	(Portugal)	Joel Pereira	2	0	0	2
6	6	MF	(Sweden)	Jesper Karlström	2	0	0	2
6	16	DF	(Croatia)	Antonio Milić	1	0	1	2
6	22	MF	(Poland)	Radosław Murawski	1	0	1	2
6	54	MF	(Poland)	Filip Wilak	0	2	0	2
11	15	DF	(Poland)	Michał Gurgul	1	0	0	1
11	21	MF	(Bosnia and Herzegovina)	Dino Hotić	0	0	1	1
11	23	DF	(Slovenia)	Miha Blažič	1	0	0	1
11	25	DF	(Sweden)	Filip Dagerstål	1	0	0	1
11	30	MF	(Georgia (country))	Nika Kvekveskiri	1	0	0	1
11	44	DF	(Poland)	Alan Czerwiński	1	0	0	1
TOTALS					47	5	8	60

=== Assists ===
As of 25 May 2024.

Place	Number	Position	Nation	Name	Ekstraklasa	Polish Cup	UEFA Europa Conference League	Total
1	2	DF	(Portugal)	Joel Pereira	5	0	2	7
2	10	MF	(Poland)	Filip Marchwiński	5	0	1	6
3	11	MF	(Norway)	Kristoffer Velde	5	0	0	5
4	5	DF	(Sweden)	Elias Andersson	3	0	1	4
4	6	MF	(Sweden)	Jesper Karlström	3	0	1	4
4	9	FW	(Sweden)	Mikael Ishak	3	0	1	4
4	17	FW	(Poland)	Filip Szymczak	2	2	0	4
8	21	MF	(Bosnia and Herzegovina)	Dino Hotić	2	1	0	3
8	50	MF	(Ivory Coast)	Adriel Ba Loua	3	0	0	3
10	30	MF	(Georgia (country))	Nika Kvekveskiri	2	0	0	2
10	44	DF	(Poland)	Alan Czerwiński	1	0	1	2
12	7	MF	(Portugal)	Afonso Sousa	1	0	0	1
12	18	DF	(Poland)	Bartosz Salamon	1	0	0	1
12	23	DF	(Slovenia)	Miha Blažič	0	0	1	1
12	22	MF	(Poland)	Radosław Murawski	1	0	0	1
12	90	FW	(Poland)	Artur Sobiech	1	0	0	1
TOTALS					38	3	8	49

=== Clean sheets ===
As of 25 May 2024.

Place	Number	Nation	Name	Ekstraklasa	Polish Cup	UEFA Europa Conference League	Total
1	41	(Poland)	Bartosz Mrozek	11	0	0	11
2	35	(Poland)	Filip Bednarek	1	2	0	3
TOTALS				12	2	0	14

=== Disciplinary record ===
As of 25 May 2024.

Number	Position	Nation	Name	Ekstraklasa			Polish Cup			UEFA Europa Conference League			Total		
Number	Position	Nation	Name	Booked	(yellow card) (yellow-red card)	Sent off (straight red)	Booked	(yellow card) (yellow-red card)	Sent off (straight red)	Booked	(yellow card) (yellow-red card)	Sent off (straight red)	Booked	(yellow card) (yellow-red card)	Sent off (straight red)
2	DF	(Portugal)	Joel Pereira	1	0	0	0	0	0	0	0	0	1	0	0
3	DF	(Scotland)	Barry Douglas	3	0	0	1	0	0	0	0	0	4	0	0
5	DF	(Sweden)	Elias Andersson	5	0	0	0	0	0	1	0	0	6	0	0
6	MF	(Sweden)	Jesper Karlström	6	1	0	1	0	0	0	0	0	7	1	0
7	MF	(Portugal)	Afonso Sousa	3	0	0	0	0	0	1	0	0	4	0	0
8	MF	(Iran)	Ali Gholizadeh	2	0	0	0	0	0	–			2	0	0
9	FW	(Sweden)	Mikael Ishak	6	0	0	0	0	0	1	0	0	7	0	0
10	MF	(Poland)	Filip Marchwiński	4	0	1	0	0	0	1	0	0	5	0	1
11	MF	(Norway)	Kristoffer Velde	7	0	0	1	0	0	0	0	0	8	0	0
15	DF	(Poland)	Michał Gurgul	1	0	0	–			0	0	0	1	0	0
16	DF	(Croatia)	Antonio Milić	3	0	0	1	0	0	0	0	0	4	0	0
17	FW	(Poland)	Filip Szymczak	4	0	0	0	0	0	0	0	0	4	0	0
18	DF	(Poland)	Bartosz Salamon	5	0	0	0	0	0	–			5	0	0
19	MF	(Poland)	Maksymilian Dziuba	0	0	0	1	0	0	–			1	0	0
20	DF	(Poland)	Bartosz Tomaszewski	–									0	0	0
21	MF	(Bosnia and Herzegovina)	Dino Hotić	2	0	0	0	0	0	0	0	0	2	0	0
22	MF	(Poland)	Radosław Murawski	8	0	1	0	0	0	1	0	0	9	0	1
23	DF	(Slovenia)	Miha Blažič	2	0	0	0	0	0	0	0	0	2	0	0
25	DF	(Sweden)	Filip Dagerstål	1	0	0	–			0	0	0	1	0	0
30	MF	(Georgia (country))	Nika Kvekveskiri	1	0	0	0	0	0	0	0	0	1	0	0
31	GK	(Poland)	Mateusz Mędrala	–									0	0	0
33	GK	(Poland)	Mateusz Pruchniewski	–									0	0	0
35	GK	(Poland)	Filip Bednarek	1	0	0	0	0	0	0	0	0	1	0	0
41	GK	(Poland)	Bartosz Mrozek	3	0	0	–			0	0	0	3	0	0
44	DF	(Poland)	Alan Czerwiński	2	0	0	0	0	0	0	0	0	2	0	0
50	MF	(Ivory Coast)	Adriel Ba Loua	1	0	0	0	0	0	0	0	0	1	0	0
53	MF	(Poland)	Aleksander Nadolski	–									0	0	0
56	MF	(Poland)	Kornel Lisman	–									0	0	0
74	FW	(Poland)	Norbert Pacławski	–			0	0	0	–			0	0	0
90	FW	(Poland)	Artur Sobiech	1	0	0	0	0	0	0	0	0	1	0	0
Players who appeared for Lech and left the club during the season:
54	MF	(Poland)	Filip Wilak	0	0	0	0	0	0	0	0	0	0	0	0
55	DF	(Poland)	Maksymilian Pingot	0	0	0	0	0	0	1	0	0	1	0	0
TOTALS				72	1	2	5	0	0	6	0	0	83	1	2

=== Home attendances ===
As of 25 May 2024.

	Matches	Total attendances	Average attendance	Highest attendance	Lowest attendance
Ekstraklasa	17	422,485	24,852	40,362	14,104
Polish Cup	1	17,434	17,434	17,434	17,434
UEFA Europa Conference League	2	55,279	27,640	29,122	26,157
Total	20	495,198	24,760	40,362	14,104
