= Filip Marchwiński =

Polish footballer (born 2002)

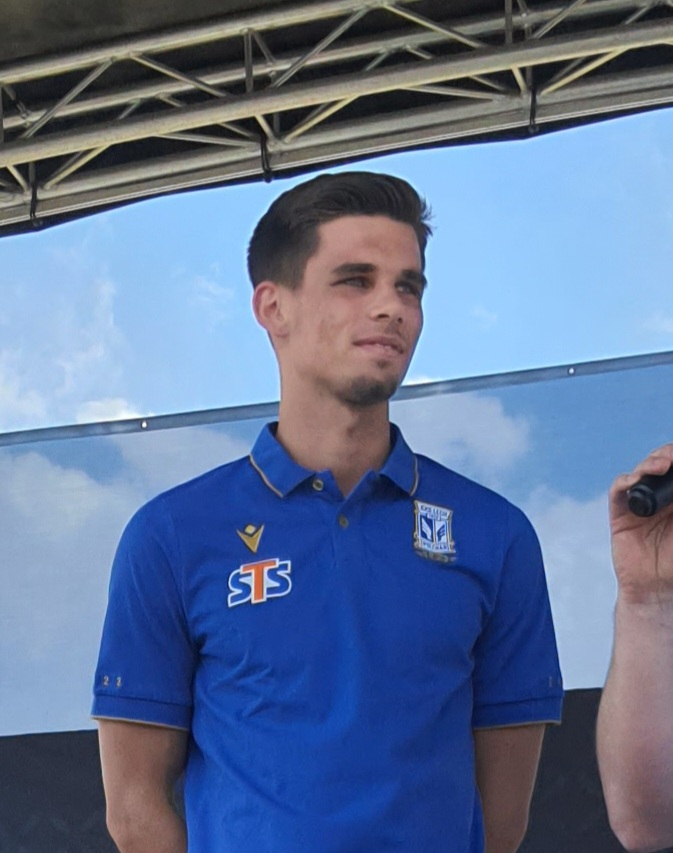
- Marchwiński with Lech Poznań in 2022

Personal information
- Date of birth: 10 January 2002 (age 24)
- Place of birth: Poznań, Poland
- Height: 1.87 m (6 ft 2 in)
- Position: Attacking midfielder

Team information
- Current team: Cracovia (on loan from Lecce)
- Number: 10

Youth career
- 2007–2009: UKS Skórzewo
- 2009–2018: Lech Poznań

Senior career*
Years	Team	Apps	(Gls)
2018–2022	Lech Poznań II	34	(8)
2018–2024	Lech Poznań	125	(19)
2024–	Lecce	1	(0)
2026–	→ Cracovia (loan)	1	(0)

International career
2015	Poland U14	1	(2)
2016–2017	Poland U15	4	(2)
2017–2018	Poland U16	7	(7)
2018–2019	Poland U17	7	(3)
2019–2020	Poland U19	7	(0)
2020–2024	Poland U21	23	(1)
2023	Poland	2	(0)
- * Club domestic league appearances and goals as of 11:05, 1 August 2026 (UTC)

Filip Marchwiński (born 10 January 2002) is a Polish professional footballer who plays as an attacking midfielder for Ekstraklasa club Cracovia, on loan from Serie A club Lecce.

== Club career ==
Marchwiński is a youth product of Lech Poznań, and was registered to their first team squad on 12 December 2018. On 16 December 2018, he made his professional debut with Lech Poznań in a 6–0 Ekstraklasa away win over Zagłębie Sosnowiec and scored his team's final goal, becoming the youngest Ekstraklasa scorer in club's history, at the age of 16 years and 340 days.

On 25 July 2024, Marchwiński travelled to Italy to undergo a medical with Serie A club Lecce. The following day, he signed a four-year contract, with an option for a further year. The transfer fee was not disclosed, and reported to be €3 million, with an additional €1 million in bonuses. He made three appearances in all competitions before having his first season abroad cut short by an ACL and meniscus injury in January 2025.

On 18 July 2026, Marchwiński joined Ekstraklasa club Cracovia on a season-long loan, with an option to make the move permanent. He made his first official appearance since September 2024 on 25 July 2026, as a substitute in a goalless draw against his former club Lech Poznań at the Poznań Stadium. A few days later, he suffered another ACL tear during training.

== International career ==
Marchwiński has been a part of Poland youth system since as early as 2014, when he received his first call-up to Poland U13s. He scored twice in his only appearance for the under-14 squad in a 5–0 win against Slovakia on 17 November 2015.

Over the years, Marchwiński became a regular member of the under-16, under-17 and under-19 teams, before making his debut for Poland under-21 on 17 November 2020 in a 2021 UEFA Euro U21 qualifying match against Latvia, which Poland won 5–1.

In recognition of Marchwiński's good start to the 2023–24 campaign, the former under-21 team manager Michał Probierz rewarded him with his first Poland senior team call-up for the UEFA Euro 2024 qualifying matches against the Faroe Islands and Moldova on 12 and 15 October that year. He made his debut as a substitute in a 0–2 away win against the Faroese.

== Career statistics ==
=== Club ===
As of match played 25 July 2026

Appearances and goals by club, season and competition
Club	Season	League			National cup (Note: Includes Polish Cup, Coppa Italia)		Europe		Other		Total	
Club	Season	Division	Apps	Goals	Apps	Goals	Apps	Goals	Apps	Goals	Apps	Goals
Lech Poznań II	2018–19	III liga, gr. II	12	3	—		—		—		12	3
Lech Poznań II	2019–20	II liga	8	2	—		—		—		8	2
Lech Poznań II	2020–21	II liga	7	2	0	0	—		—		7	2
Lech Poznań II	2021–22	II liga	6	1	0	0	—		—		6	1
Lech Poznań II	2022–23	II liga	1	0	0	0	—		—		1	0
Lech Poznań II	Total		34	8	0	0	—		—		34	8
Lech Poznań	2018–19	Ekstraklasa	11	2	0	0	0	0	—		11	2
Lech Poznań	2019–20	Ekstraklasa	20	3	3	1	—		—		23	4
Lech Poznań	2020–21	Ekstraklasa	21	1	2	0	9 (Note: Appearances in UEFA Europa League)	1	—		32	2
Lech Poznań	2021–22	Ekstraklasa	18	0	5	1	—		—		23	1
Lech Poznań	2022–23	Ekstraklasa	27	5	0	0	15 (Note: One appearance in UEFA Champions League, fourteen appearances and three goals in UEFA Europa Conference League)	3	0	0	42	8
Lech Poznań	2023–24	Ekstraklasa	28	8	3	1	4 (Note: Appearances in UEFA Europa Conference League)	2	—		35	11
Lech Poznań	Total		125	19	13	3	28	6	0	0	166	28
Lecce	2024–25	Serie A	1	0	2	0	—		—		3	0
Lecce	2025–26	Serie A	0	0	0	0	—		—		0	0
Lecce	Total		1	0	2	0	—		—		3	0
Cracovia (loan)	2026–27	Ekstraklasa	1	0	0	0	—		—		1	0
Career total			161	27	15	3	28	6	0	0	204	36

=== International ===
As of match played 15 October 2023

Appearances and goals by national team and year
National team	Year	Apps	Goals
Poland	2023	2	0
Total		2	0

== Honours ==
Lech Poznań II

- III liga, group II: 2018–19

Lech Poznań

- Ekstraklasa: 2021–22

Individual

- Ekstraklasa Player of the Month: July 2023
- Ekstraklasa Young Player of the Month: March 2023, July 2023
