= Maksymilian Pingot =

Polish footballer

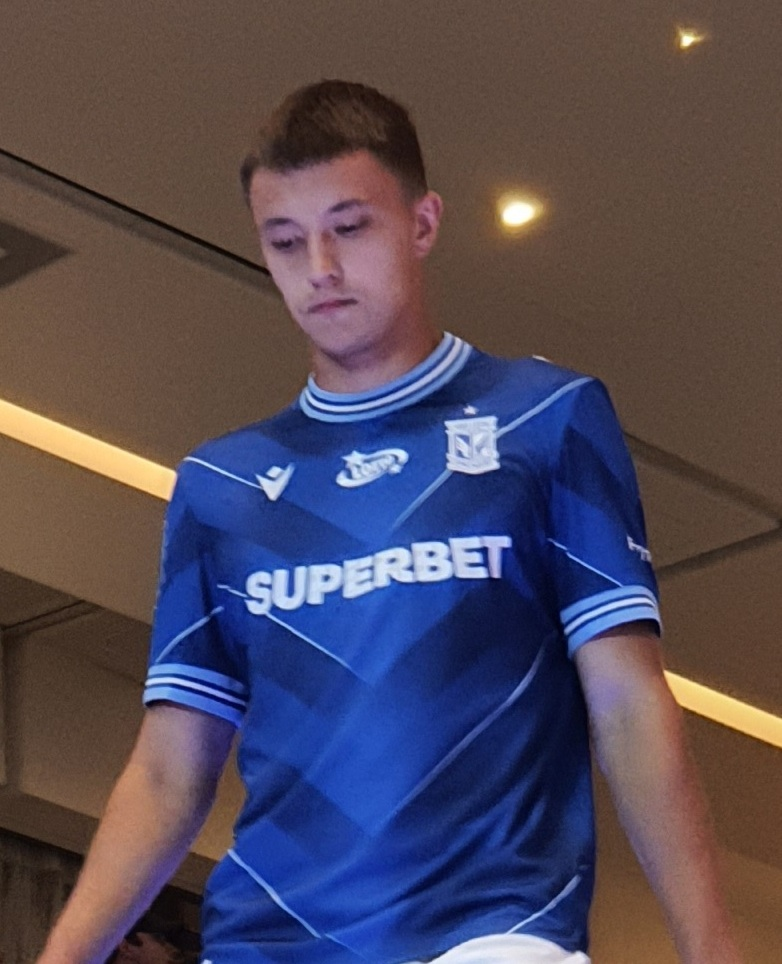
- Pingot in 2023 with Lech Poznań

Personal information
- Date of birth: 1 April 2003 (age 23)
- Place of birth: Konin, Poland
- Height: 1.88 m (6 ft 2 in)
- Position: Centre-back

Team information
- Current team: Odra Opole (on loan from Górnik Zabrze)
- Number: 55

Youth career
- –2016: Sparta Konin
- 2016–2021: Lech Poznań

Senior career*
Years	Team	Apps	(Gls)
2021–2025	Lech Poznań II	55	(2)
2022–2025	Lech Poznań	14	(0)
2023	→ Odra Opole (loan)	11	(0)
2024	→ Stal Mielec (loan)	13	(0)
2025–	Górnik Zabrze	8	(0)
2025	Górnik Zabrze II	4	(1)
2026	→ ŁKS Łódź (loan)	9	(0)
2026–	→ Odra Opole (loan)	0	(0)

International career
2022–2024	Poland U21	11	(1)
- * Club domestic league appearances and goals as of 15:57, 29 May 2026 (UTC)

Maksymilian Pingot (born 1 April 2003) is a Polish professional footballer who plays as a centre-back for I liga club Odra Opole, on loan from Górnik Zabrze.

== Career ==
=== Early career ===
Pingot started his career in his hometown of Konin, training with Sparta until the age of 13.

=== Lech Poznań ===
In 2016, he joined Lech Poznań's academy. On 10 April 2021, he made his professional debut with Lech Poznań II in a 1–3 away league win against Olimpia Grudziądz.

At the start of 2022, he joined the first team roster. On 9 July 2022, he made his competitive debut for Lech, coming on as a substitute in the 74th minute of a 0–2 Super Cup loss against Raków Częstochowa. A week later, he made his Ekstraklasa debut as a starter in a 0–2 home loss against Stal Mielec.

On 5 December 2023, Pingot signed a contract extension to keep him at the club until mid-2028.

==== Loan to Odra Opole ====
On 2 January 2023, he was loaned to I liga side Odra Opole until June 2024.

==== Loan to Stal Mielec ====
On 8 January 2024, Pingot joined fellow Ekstraklasa side Stal Mielec on loan until June 2025. Pingot made 13 starts for Stal before being recalled by Lech in June 2024.

=== Górnik Zabrze ===
On 27 June 2025, Pingot moved to Ekstraklasa club Górnik Zabrze on a three-year contract, for an undisclosed fee.

==== Loan to ŁKS Łódź ====
On 28 January 2026, Pingot was sent on loan to I liga club ŁKS Łódź for the rest of the season.

==== Second loan to Odra Opole ====
On 8 July 2026, Pingot joined Odra Opole on loan for the second time in his career.

== Career statistics ==
As of match played 28 May 2026

Appearances and goals by club, season and competition
Club	Season	League			Polish Cup		Europe		Other		Total	
Club	Season	Division	Apps	Goals	Apps	Goals	Apps	Goals	Apps	Goals	Apps	Goals
Lech Poznań II	2020–21	II liga	13	0	—		—		—		13	0
Lech Poznań II	2021–22	II liga	24	2	3	0	—		—		27	2
Lech Poznań II	2022–23	II liga	7	0	0	0	—		—		7	0
Lech Poznań II	2023–24	II liga	8	0	0	0	—		—		8	0
Lech Poznań II	2024–25	III liga, group II	3	0	0	0	—		—		3	0
Lech Poznań II	Total		55	2	3	0	—		—		58	2
Lech Poznań	2022–23	Ekstraklasa	5	0	1	0	3 (Note: Appearance(s) in UEFA Europa Conference League)	0	1 (Note: Appearance in Polish Super Cup)	0	10	0
Lech Poznań	2023–24	Ekstraklasa	2	0	1	0	1	0	—		4	0
Lech Poznań	2024–25	Ekstraklasa	7	0	1	0	—		—		8	0
Lech Poznań	Total		14	0	3	0	4	0	1	0	23	0
Odra Opole (loan)	2022–23	I liga	11	0	—		—		—		11	0
Stal Mielec (loan)	2023–24	Ekstraklasa	13	0	—		—		—		13	0
Górnik Zabrze	2025–26	Ekstraklasa	8	0	3	0	—		—		11	0
Górnik Zabrze II	2025–26	III liga, group III	4	1	—		—		—		4	1
ŁKS Łódź (loan)	2025–26	I liga	8	0	—		—		1 (Note: Appearance in I liga promotion play-offs)	0	9	0
Odra Opole (loan)	2026–27	I liga	0	0	0	0	—		—		0	0
Career total			113	3	9	0	4	0	2	0	128	3

== Honours ==
Lech Poznań

- Ekstraklasa: 2024–25
