= Bartosz Mrozek =

Polish footballer

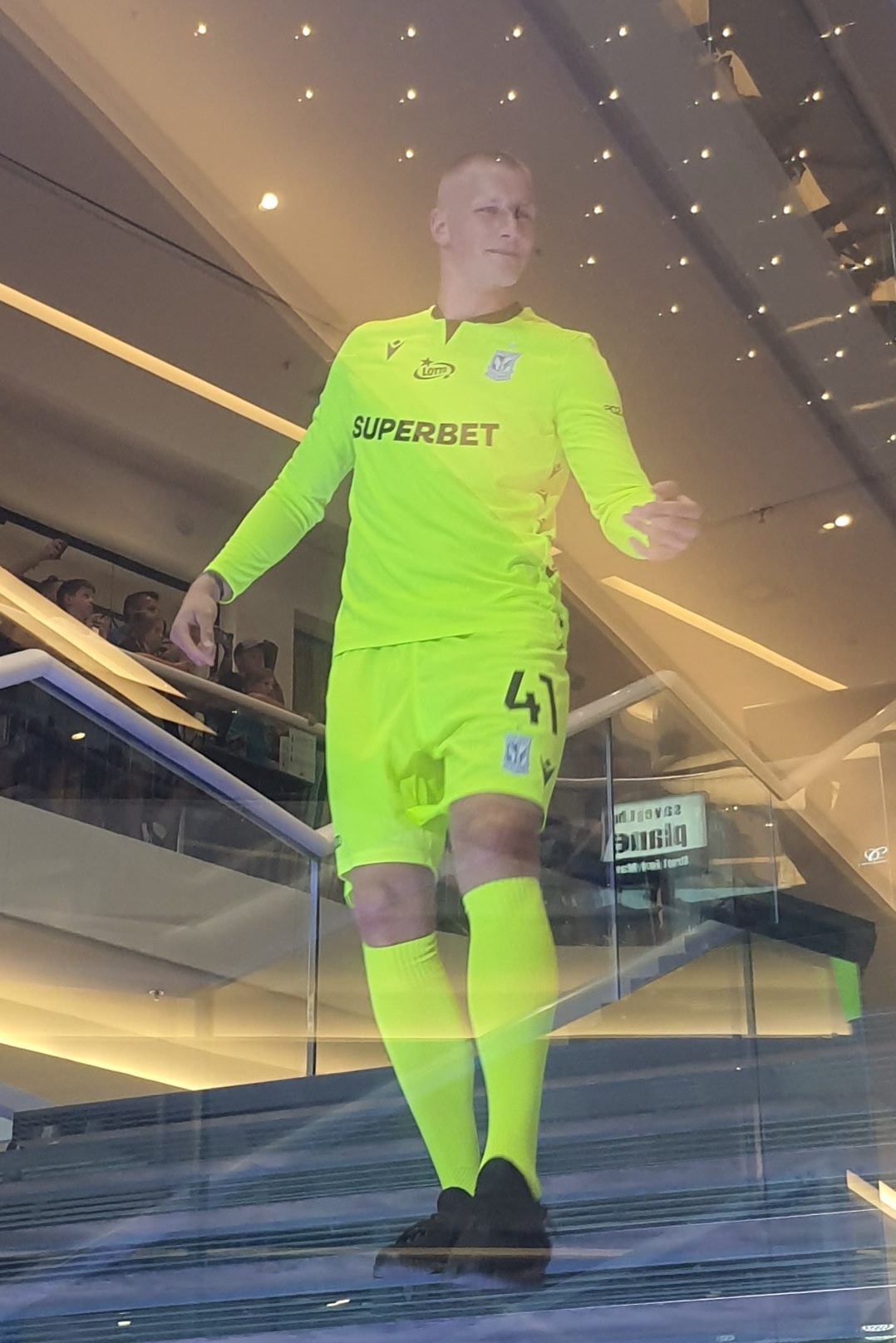
- Mrozek with Lech Poznań in 2023

Personal information
- Date of birth: 23 February 2000 (age 26)
- Place of birth: Katowice, Poland
- Height: 1.91 m (6 ft 3 in)
- Position: Goalkeeper

Team information
- Current team: Udinese
- Number: 41

Youth career
- –2008: Polonia Łaziska Górne
- 2008–2010: Rozwój Katowice
- 2010–2012: Stadion Śląski Chorzów
- 2012: Chrzciciel Tychy
- 2013–2014: GKS Tychy
- 2014–2016: Lech Poznań

Senior career*
Years	Team	Apps	(Gls)
2016–2022	Lech Poznań II	40	(0)
2016–2026	Lech Poznań	98	(0)
2018–2019	→ Elana Toruń (loan)	12	(0)
2019–2021	→ GKS Katowice (loan)	63	(0)
2022	→ Stal Mielec (loan)	2	(0)
2022–2023	→ Stal Mielec (loan)	34	(0)
2026–	Udinese	0	(0)

International career
2014	Poland U15	3	(0)
2015–2016	Poland U16	5	(0)
2016–2017	Poland U17	8	(0)
2017–2018	Poland U18	4	(0)
2018	Poland U19	1	(0)
2019	Poland U20	2	(0)
- * Club domestic league appearances and goals as of 21:04, 25 May 2026 (UTC)

Bartosz Mrozek (born 23 February 2000) is a Polish professional footballer who plays as a goalkeeper for Serie A club Udinese.

== Club career ==
=== Youth career ===
Starting his youth career with several Silesian clubs, Mrozek joined Lech Poznań's youth setup in mid-2014. In 2017, he joined English club Manchester United on a trial basis and drew interest from Crystal Palace, before making his first senior appearances for Lech's reserve team that year.

=== Lech Poznań ===
==== Loans to Elana, GKS & Stal ====
Starting from the 2018–19 season, he spent three years on loan at third division outfits Olimpia Elbląg and GKS Katowice.

On 12 May 2022, Mrozek joined Ekstraklasa club Stal Mielec on an emergency loan until the end of the season, after Stal's goalkeepers Rafał Strączek and Damian Primel suffered injuries ruling them out for the remainder of the campaign. He made his Ekstraklasa debut three days later, on 15 May 2022, in a 1–1 home draw against Śląsk Wrocław which secured his team's survival from relegation.

On 16 June 2022, he extended his contract with Lech until June 2024 and was sent on loan to Stal again, until the end of the season, with an option to buy. Mrozek remained a starter for Stal throughout the entire campaign, keeping 12 clean sheets in 34 league matches. After Stal made use of their buy option at the end of the season, Lech immediately exercised their buy-back clause to bring Mrozek back to the club on a new three-year deal.

==== First-team breakthrough, domestic success ====
Having started the 2023–24 campaign as back-up to Filip Bednarek, Mrozek eventually earned a regular spot in Lech's line-up. He went on to keep 11 clean sheets in 31 Ekstraklasa appearances, as Lech finished the season in 5th.

On 8 November 2024, he signed a contract extension with Lech, keeping him at the club until June 2028. Mrozek started and played all 34 games of the 2024–25 league campaign, keeping 14 clean sheets, as Lech won their ninth Ekstraklasa title. For his efforts, he was named the Ekstraklasa Goalkeeper of the Season.

Mrozek continued to be a mainstay in Niels Frederiksen's side, as he started 53 out of 54 of Lech's games throughout the 2025–26 season that ended in a successful title defence; he missed a single league game in April 2026 after being bitten by a dog.

Following the arrival of Mateusz Lis in the summer of 2026, Mrozek lost his spot in the starting line-up. In total, he made 121 appearances for Lech's senior team, keeping 42 clean sheets.

=== Udinese ===
On 28 August 2026, Mrozek moved to Serie A side Udinese for a reported fee of €1.5 million. On 2 September, Mrozek made his debut for Udinese during a Coppa Italia match against Venezia, which ended in a 2–1 victory for Udinese.

== International career ==
A youth international for Poland, Mrozek received his first call-up to the Poland national team for UEFA Nations League matches against Scotland and Croatia in September 2024.

== Personal life ==
His father Piotr is a football manager and coach, and a former player.

== Career statistics ==
As of match played 2 September 2026

Appearances and goals by club, season and competition
Club	Season	League			National cup (Note: Includes Polish Cup, Coppa Italia)		Europe		Other		Total	
Club	Season	Division	Apps	Goals	Apps	Goals	Apps	Goals	Apps	Goals	Apps	Goals
Lech Poznań II	2016–17	III liga, gr. II	3	0	—		—		—		3	0
Lech Poznań II	2017–18	III liga, gr. II	16	0	—		—		—		16	0
Lech Poznań II	2021–22	II liga	21	0	0	0	—		—		21	0
Lech Poznań II	Total		40	0	0	0	—		—		40	0
Lech Poznań	2021–22	Ekstraklasa	0	0	2	0	—		—		2	0
Lech Poznań	2023–24	Ekstraklasa	31	0	0	0	1 (Note: Appearance in UEFA Europa Conference League)	0	—		32	0
Lech Poznań	2024–25	Ekstraklasa	34	0	0	0	—		—		34	0
Lech Poznań	2025–26	Ekstraklasa	33	0	3	0	16 (Note: Four appearances in UEFA Champions League, two appearances in UEFA Europa League, ten appearances in UEFA Conference League)	0	1 (Note: Appearance in Polish Super Cup)	0	53	0
Lech Poznań	2026–27	Ekstraklasa	0	0	—		0	0	0	0	0	0
Lech Poznań	Total		98	0	5	0	17	0	1	0	121	0
Elana Toruń (loan)	2018–19	II liga	12	0	1	0	—		—		13	0
GKS Katowice (loan)	2019–20	II liga	32	0	2	0	—		—		34	0
GKS Katowice (loan)	2020–21	II liga	31	0	0	0	—		—		31	0
GKS Katowice (loan)	Total		63	0	2	0	—		—		65	0
Stal Mielec (loan)	2021–22	Ekstraklasa	2	0	—		—		—		2	0
Stal Mielec (loan)	2022–23	Ekstraklasa	34	0	0	0	—		—		34	0
Stal Mielec (loan)	Total		36	0	0	0	—		—		36	0
Udinese	2026–27	Serie A	0	0	1	0	—		—		1	0
Career total			249	0	9	0	17	0	1	0	276	0

== Honours ==
Lech Poznań

- Ekstraklasa: 2024–25, 2025–26

Individual

- Ekstraklasa Goalkeeper of the Season: 2024–25
