= Alan Czerwiński =

Polish footballer (born 1993)

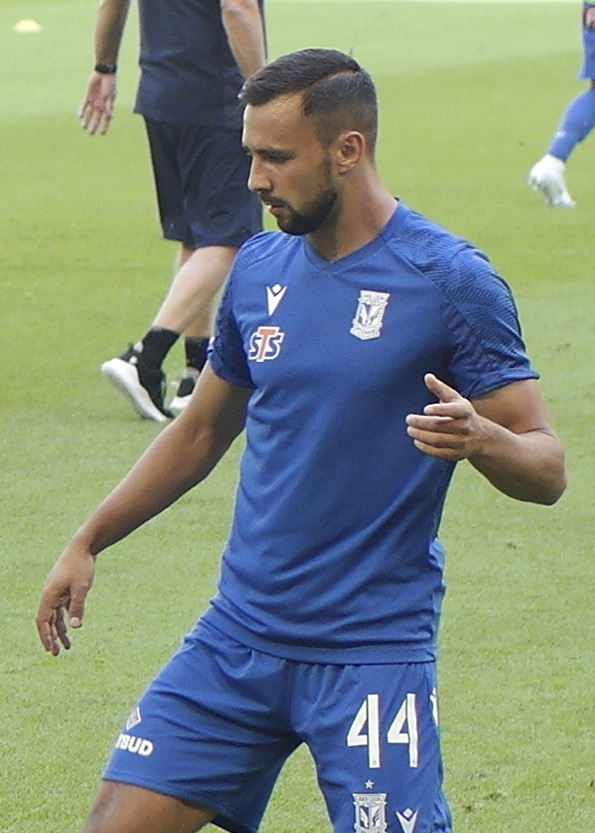
- Czerwiński with Lech Poznań in 2022

Personal information
- Full name: Alan Czerwiński
- Date of birth: 2 February 1993 (age 33)
- Place of birth: Olkusz, Poland
- Height: 1.80 m (5 ft 11 in)
- Position: Centre-back

Team information
- Current team: GKS Katowice
- Number: 30

Youth career
- –2006: Bolesław Bukowno
- 2006–2007: Wisła Kraków
- 2007–2009: Bolesław Bukowno
- 2009–2010: Rekord Bielsko-Biała

Senior career*
Years	Team	Apps	(Gls)
2010–2012	Rekord Bielsko-Biała		
2012–2017	GKS Katowice	137	(2)
2017–2020	Zagłębie Lubin	82	(2)
2020–2024	Lech Poznań	85	(2)
2020–2022	Lech Poznań II	3	(0)
2024–	GKS Katowice	63	(0)

International career
2020	Poland	1	(0)
- * Club domestic league appearances and goals as of 22:13, 12 August 2026 (UTC)

Alan Czerwiński (born 2 February 1993) is a Polish professional footballer who plays as a centre-back for Ekstraklasa club GKS Katowice.

== Club career ==
=== Early career ===
Czerwiński began playing football with Bolesław Bukowno. He spent part of his youth career with Wisła Kraków before returning to Bukowno, and in 2009 joined Rekord Bielsko-Biała. He subsequently made his senior debut for Rekord.

=== GKS Katowice ===
In 2012, Czerwiński joined GKS Katowice, then competing in the I liga. He made his league debut for the club on 1 September 2012. During his first season, he recorded 24 league appearances.

Czerwiński remained with GKS for five seasons, making 137 league appearances and scoring twice. His performances earned him the club's Złoty Buk award as GKS Katowice Player of the Year in both 2016 and 2017. He left the club following the expiry of his contract in 2017.

=== Zagłębie Lubin ===
In June 2017, Czerwiński joined Ekstraklasa club Zagłębie Lubin on a three-year contract. The transfer gave him his first opportunity to play in Poland's top division after five seasons in the I liga.

He made 31 league appearances and scored once in his first Ekstraklasa season. Although his playing time was reduced during the 2018–19 campaign, he returned to regular first-team football the following season, appearing in 35 league matches and scoring once. Across his three seasons in Lubin, Czerwiński made 82 league appearances and scored two goals. His performances for Zagłębie led to interest from Lech Poznań.

=== Lech Poznań ===
On 10 January 2020, Czerwiński signed a three-year contract with Lech, which took effect on 1 July following the expiry of his Zagłębie agreement.

He made his competitive debut on 15 August 2020, starting in a 3–1 away victory over Odra Opole in the Polish Cup. During his first months with the club, Czerwiński appeared in all four qualifying rounds as Lech reached the group stage of the 2020–21 UEFA Europa League. He made nine European appearances during the campaign.

Czerwiński was part of the Lech squad that won the 2021–22 Ekstraklasa, the club's first league championship in seven years. He made 11 league appearances during the title-winning season and scored in a 2–1 victory over his former club Zagłębie Lubin on the final matchday.

In the following season, Lech reached the quarter-finals of the 2022–23 UEFA Europa Conference League. Czerwiński made eight appearances in European competition during the campaign, including one in Champions League qualifying and seven in the Conference League. He played a further 27 league matches during the 2023–24 season.

Czerwiński left Lech in July 2024 after four seasons. He made 113 first-team appearances for the club, including 19 in European competition, and contributed to the league championship and Lech's run to the Conference League quarter-finals.

=== Return to GKS Katowice ===
On 9 July 2024, Czerwiński returned to GKS Katowice, seven years after leaving the club. He joined on a permanent transfer and signed a three-year contract running until 30 June 2027.

He became a regular member of the team in its first season back in the Ekstraklasa, making 32 league appearances during the 2024–25 campaign. GKS finished the season in eighth place.

Czerwiński made another 29 league appearances in 2025–26 as GKS finished fifth and qualified for the UEFA Conference League. In July 2026, he played in both matches of the club's second qualifying-round tie against MŠK Žilina. GKS lost the first leg 2–1 but won the return match 3–1, progressing 4–3 on aggregate.

== International career ==
On 6 October 2020, Czerwiński received his first call-up to the Poland senior national team. He was added to the squad for a friendly against Finland and UEFA Nations League matches against Italy and Bosnia and Herzegovina.

He made his international debut the following day in a 5–1 friendly victory over Finland in Gdańsk, replacing Bartosz Bereszyński in the 62nd minute. It remained his only senior international appearance.

== Career statistics ==
=== Club ===
As of match played 12 August 2026

Appearances and goals by club, season and competition
Club	Season	League			Polish Cup		Continental		Other		Total	
Club	Season	Division	Apps	Goals	Apps	Goals	Apps	Goals	Apps	Goals	Apps	Goals
GKS Katowice	2012–13	I liga	24	0	0	0	—		—		24	0
GKS Katowice	2013–14	I liga	27	1	2	0	—		—		29	1
GKS Katowice	2014–15	I liga	24	1	1	0	—		—		25	1
GKS Katowice	2015–16	I liga	32	0	3	0	—		—		35	0
GKS Katowice	2016–17	I liga	30	0	0	0	—		—		30	0
GKS Katowice	Total		137	2	6	0	—		—		143	2
Zagłębie Lubin	2017–18	Ekstraklasa	31	1	2	0	—		—		33	1
Zagłębie Lubin	2018–19	Ekstraklasa	16	0	0	0	—		—		16	0
Zagłębie Lubin	2019–20	Ekstraklasa	35	1	3	0	—		—		38	1
Zagłębie Lubin	Total		82	2	5	0	—		—		87	2
Lech Poznań	2020–21	Ekstraklasa	25	0	4	0	9 (Note: Appearances in UEFA Europa League)	0	—		38	0
Lech Poznań	2021–22	Ekstraklasa	11	1	3	1	—		—		14	2
Lech Poznań	2022–23	Ekstraklasa	22	0	0	0	8 (Note: One appearance in UEFA Champions League, seven appearances in UEFA Europa Conference League)	0	1 (Note: Appearance in Polish Super Cup)	0	31	0
Lech Poznań	2023–24	Ekstraklasa	27	1	1	0	2 (Note: Appearances in UEFA Europa Conference League)	0	—		30	1
Lech Poznań	Total		85	2	8	1	19	0	1	0	113	3
Lech Poznań II	2020–21	II liga	1	0	0	0	—		—		1	0
Lech Poznań II	2021–22	II liga	2	0	0	0	—		—		2	0
Lech Poznań II	Total		3	0	0	0	—		—		3	0
GKS Katowice	2024–25	Ekstraklasa	32	0	2	0	—		—		34	0
GKS Katowice	2025–26	Ekstraklasa	29	0	4	0	—		—		33	0
GKS Katowice	2026–27	Ekstraklasa	2	0	0	0	3	0	—		5	0
GKS Katowice	Total		63	0	6	0	3	0	—		72	0
Career total			370	6	25	1	22	0	1	0	418	7

=== International ===
Appearances and goals by national team and year
National team	Year	Apps	Goals
Poland	2020	1	0
Total		1	0

== Honours ==
Lech Poznań

- Ekstraklasa: 2021–22
