= Mariusz Rumak =

Polish football manager

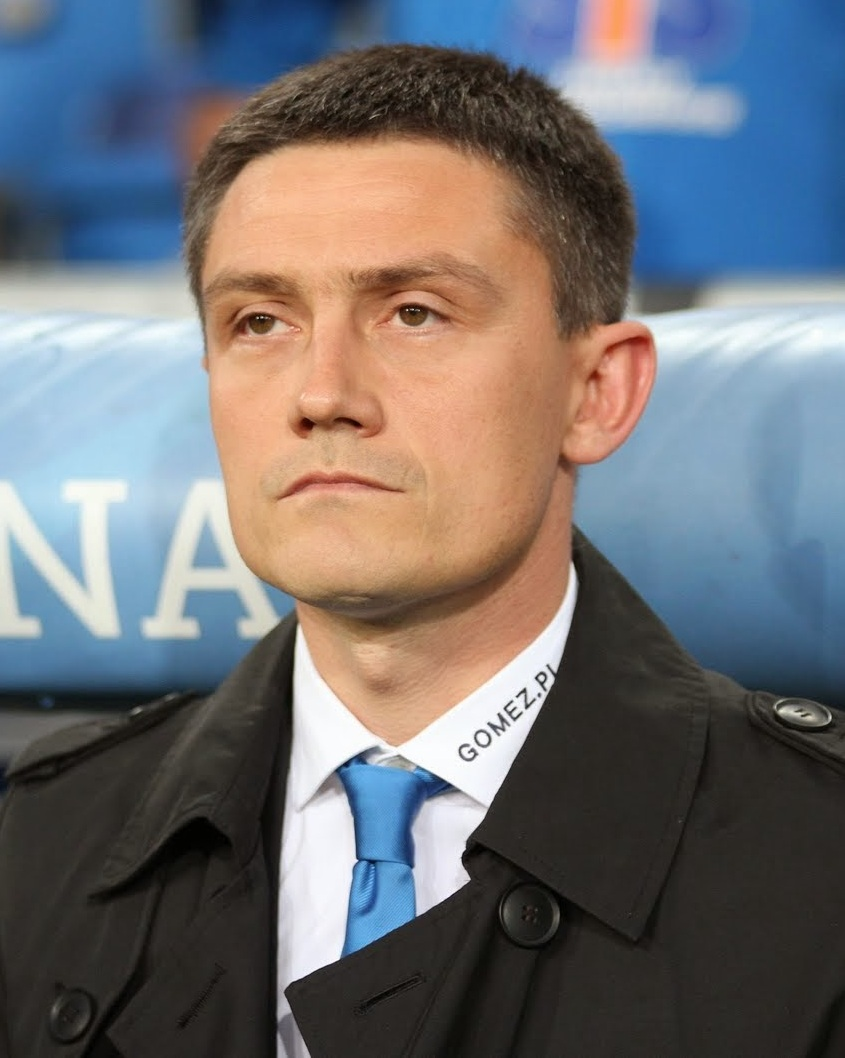
- Mariusz Rumak in 2014

Personal information
- Full name: Mariusz Rumak
- Date of birth: 3 June 1977 (age 49)
- Place of birth: Drawsko Pomorskie, Poland

Senior career*
Years	Team	Apps	(Gls)
1994–2000	Olimp Złocieniec		

Managerial career
- 2010–2011: Jagiellonia Białystok (ME)
- 2011–2012: Lech Poznań (youth)
- 2012–2014: Lech Poznań
- 2014–2015: Zawisza Bydgoszcz
- 2016: Śląsk Wrocław
- 2017: Bruk-Bet Termalica
- 2018–2019: Odra Opole
- 2021: Poland U19
- 2023–2024: Lech Poznań
- * Club domestic league appearances and goals

Mariusz Rumak (born 3 June 1977) is a Polish professional football manager and former player who was most recently in charge of Ekstraklasa club Lech Poznań.

== Career ==
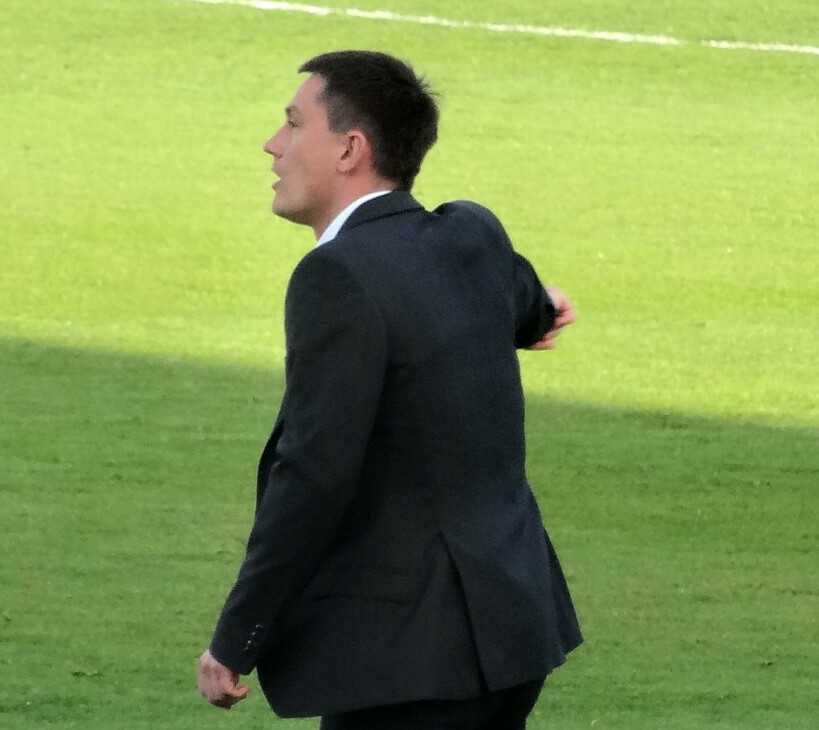
Rumak in 2015 managing Zawisza Bydgoszcz

On 27 February 2012, he signed with Ekstraklasa club Lech Poznań as senior team manager.

On 17 December 2023, after spending the last year-and-a-half in Lech Poznań's academy as a vice-director of coach development, he was again appointed as manager of Lech, until the end of the 2023–24 season. On 10 May 2024, at a press conference before Lech's 1–2 home loss to Legia Warsaw, which ended Lech's title challenge, Rumak announced he would not continue in his role in the following campaign.

== Managerial statistics ==
As of match played 25 May 2024

Managerial record by team and tenure
Team	From	To	Record							
Team	From	To	G	W	D	L	GF	GA	GD	Win %
Jagiellonia Białystok (ME)	9 June 2010	16 June 2011	30	12	7	11	38	36	+2	40.00
Lech Poznań	27 February 2012	12 August 2014	101	55	20	26	157	90	+67	54.46
Zawisza Bydgoszcz	1 September 2014	8 September 2015	39	13	10	16	58	60	−2	33.33
Śląsk Wrocław	9 March 2016	19 December 2016	33	12	11	10	40	45	−5	36.36
Bruk-Bet Termalica	1 July 2017	19 September 2017	10	2	2	6	10	13	−3	20.00
Odra Opole	14 May 2018	25 August 2019	47	14	12	21	56	74	−18	29.79
Poland U19	23 March 2021	15 November 2021	5	1	1	3	8	8	+0	20.00
Lech Poznań	17 December 2023	30 June 2024	16	5	5	6	15	17	−2	31.25
Career total			281	114	68	99	382	343	+39	40.57

== Honours ==
Individual

- Ekstraklasa Coach of the Month: April 2012, April 2013
