= Filip Bednarek =

Polish footballer

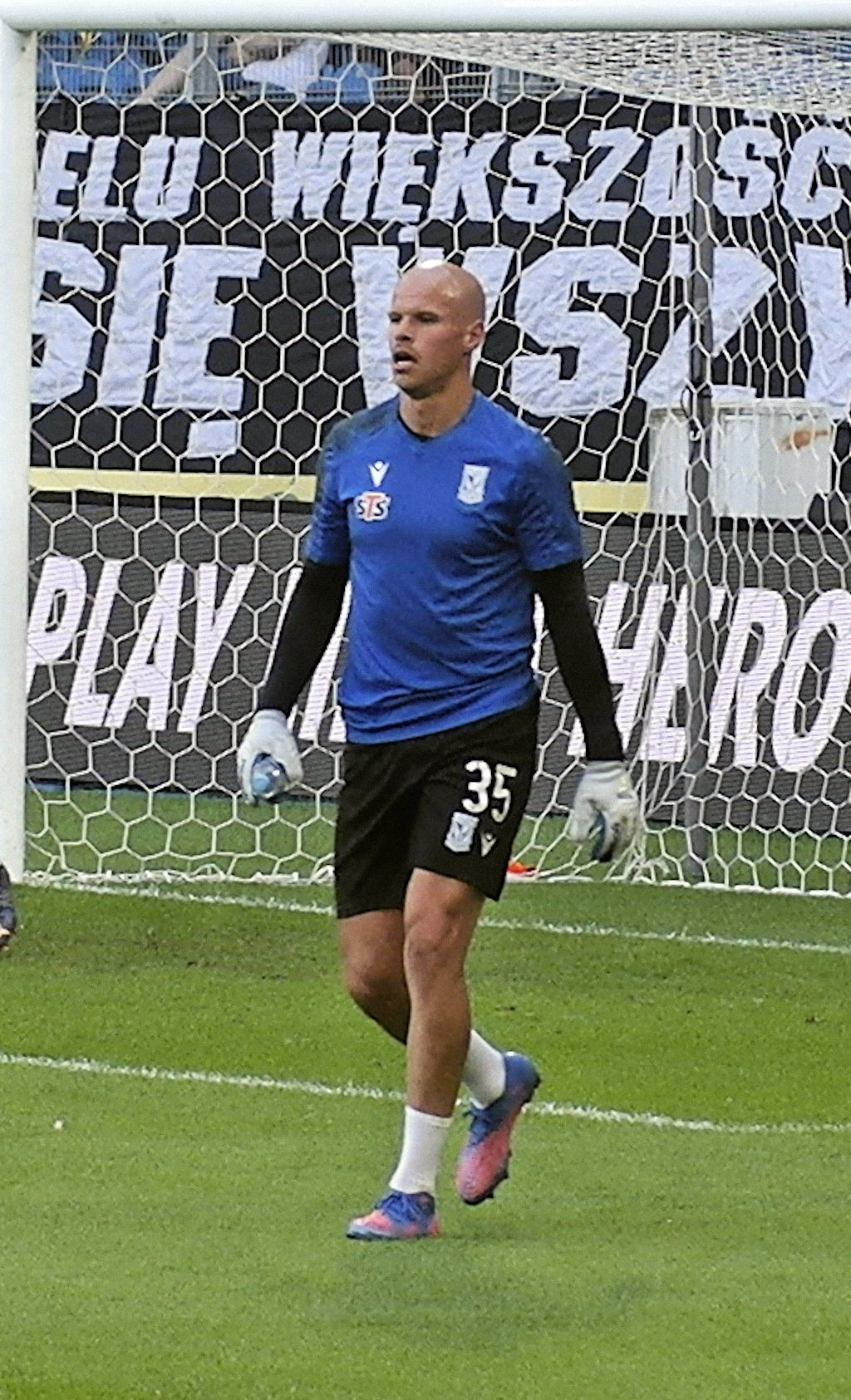
- Filip Bednarek in 2022 with Lech Poznań

Personal information
- Full name: Filip Bednarek
- Date of birth: 26 September 1992 (age 34)
- Place of birth: Słupca, Poland
- Height: 1.88 m (6 ft 2 in)
- Position: Goalkeeper

Team information
- Current team: Sparta Rotterdam
- Number: 1

Youth career
- –2007: Sokół Kleczew
- 2007–2008: Amica Wronki
- 2008–2012: Twente

Senior career*
Years	Team	Apps	(Gls)
2012–2015	Twente	0	(0)
2013–2015	Jong FC Twente	31	(0)
2015–2016	Utrecht	9	(0)
2016–2018	De Graafschap	76	(0)
2018–2020	Heerenveen	6	(0)
2020–2025	Lech Poznań	70	(0)
2021	Lech Poznań II	1	(0)
2025–	Sparta Rotterdam	4	(0)

International career
2008–2009	Poland U17		
2009	Poland U18	2	(0)
2010–2011	Poland U19	11	(0)
2014	Poland U21	1	(0)
- * Club domestic league appearances and goals as of 29 August 2026

Filip Bednarek (Polish pronunciation: [ˈfilip bɛdˈnarɛk]; born 26 September 1992) is a Polish professional footballer who plays as a goalkeeper for Eredivisie club Sparta Rotterdam.

== Club career ==
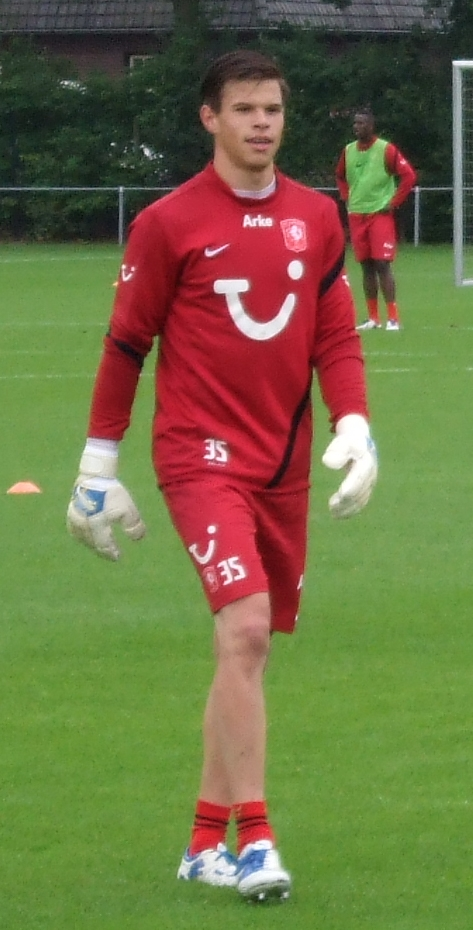
Bednarek with FC Twente

Bednarek signed for Dutch side FC Twente at the age of 16. He made his debut for the club on 6 December 2012, against Helsingborgs IF in the UEFA Europa League. Bednarek, however, was thus unable to break into the first team, and in July 2015, he left the club as a free agent.

Following a successful trial period with FC Utrecht, Bednarek signed a one-year contract with the club, including an option for an extra season.

He returned to Poland on 5 June 2020, signing a two-year deal plus a one-year option with Ekstraklasa side Lech Poznań. With Lech's then-captain Mickey van der Hart out injured, Bednarek was Lech's first-choice goalkeeper throughout the first half of the season, including their entire Europa League campaign.

In June 2025, Bednarek returned to the Netherlands and signed a two-year deal with Sparta Rotterdam.

== Career statistics ==
As of match played 28 October 2026

Appearances and goals by club, season and competition
Club	Season	League			National cup (Note: Includes KNVB Cup, Polish Cup)		Continental		Other		Total	
Club	Season	Division	Apps	Goals	Apps	Goals	Apps	Goals	Apps	Goals	Apps	Goals
Twente	2011–12	Eredivisie	0	0	0	0	0	0	—		0	0
Twente	2012–13	Eredivisie	0	0	0	0	1 (Note: Appearance(s) in UEFA Europa League)	0	—		1	0
Twente	2013–14	Eredivisie	0	0	0	0	—		—		0	0
Twente	2014–15	Eredivisie	0	0	0	0	0	0	—		0	0
Twente	Total		0	0	0	0	1	0	—		1	0
Jong FC Twente	2013–14	Eerste Divisie	15	0	—		—		—		15	0
Jong FC Twente	2014–15	Eerste Divisie	16	0	—		—		—		16	0
Jong FC Twente	Total		31	0	—		—		—		31	0
Utrecht	2015–16	Eredivisie	9	0	2	0	—		—		11	0
De Graafschap	2016–17	Eerste Divisie	38	0	1	0	—		—		39	0
De Graafschap	2017–18	Eerste Divisie	38	0	0	0	—		4 (Note: Appearances in Eerste Divisie promotion/relegation play-offs)	0	42	0
De Graafschap	Total		76	0	1	0	—		4	0	81	0
Heerenveen	2018–19	Eredivisie	0	0	0	0	—		—		0	0
Heerenveen	2019–20	Eredivisie	6	0	1	0	—		—		7	0
Heerenveen	Total		6	0	1	0	—		—		7	0
Lech Poznań	2020–21	Ekstraklasa	15	0	3	0	10	0	—		28	0
Lech Poznań	2021–22	Ekstraklasa	20	0	1	0	—		—		21	0
Lech Poznań	2022–23	Ekstraklasa	32	0	0	0	16 (Note: Appearances in UEFA Europa Conference League)	0	1 (Note: Appearance in Polish Super Cup)	0	49	0
Lech Poznań	2023–24	Ekstraklasa	3	0	3	0	3	0	—		9	0
Lech Poznań	2024–25	Ekstraklasa	0	0	1	0	—		—		1	0
Lech Poznań	Total		70	0	8	0	29	0	1	0	108	0
Lech Poznań II	2021–22	II liga	1	0	0	0	—		—		1	0
Sparta Rotterdam	2025–26	Eredivisie	0	0	3	0	—		—		3	0
Sparta Rotterdam	2026–27	Eredivisie	4	0	1	0	—		—		5	0
Sparta Rotterdam	Total		4	0	4	0	—		—		8	0
Career total			197	0	16	0	30	0	5	0	248	0

== Personal life ==
He is the older brother of Porto defender Jan Bednarek.

== Honours ==
Lech Poznań

- Ekstraklasa: 2021–22
