= Training ground =

Area where football teams prepare for matches

A training ground is an area where professional association football teams prepare for matches, with activities primarily concentrating on skills and fitness. They also sometimes form part of a club's youth system, as clubs consider it important to have good facilities to aid the development of young players.

Training grounds are usually separate from a team's stadium, as clubs use the facilities to avoid overusing the stadium's pitch. However, teams usually train inside the opposing team's stadium on the day before a European away game, both for the benefit of the media and to become familiar with the surface.

== Training ground incidents ==
There have been several high-profile incidents, at training grounds, where players have been injured in disputes between teammates. Joey Barton was given a suspended prison sentence, on 1 July 2008, for an assault on teammate Ousmane Dabo on Manchester City's training ground and Andy Carroll broke teammate Steven Taylor's jaw in a fight.

== Gallery ==
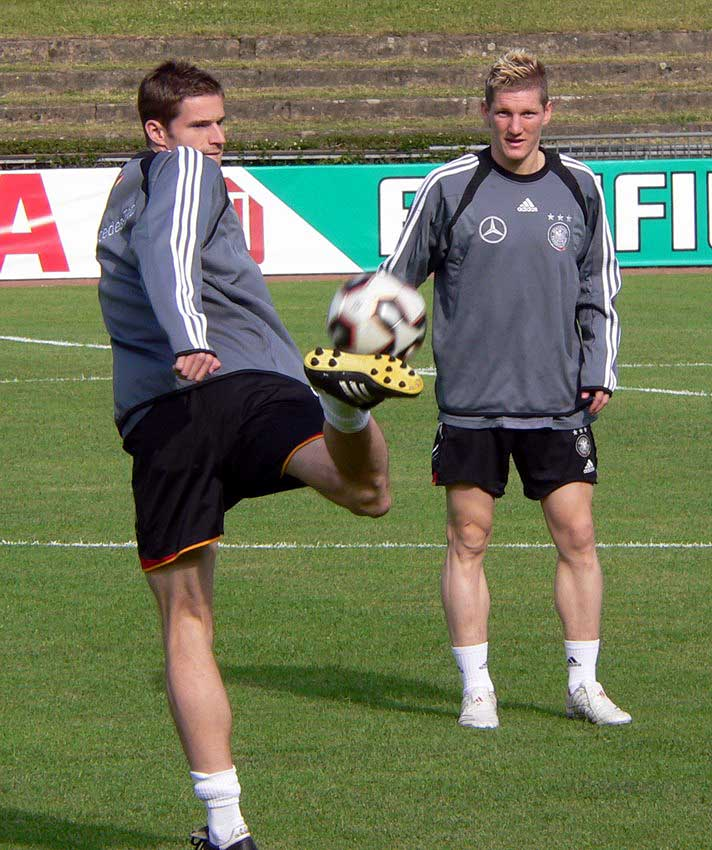
Germany players Arne Friedrich and Bastian Schweinsteiger training, 2005

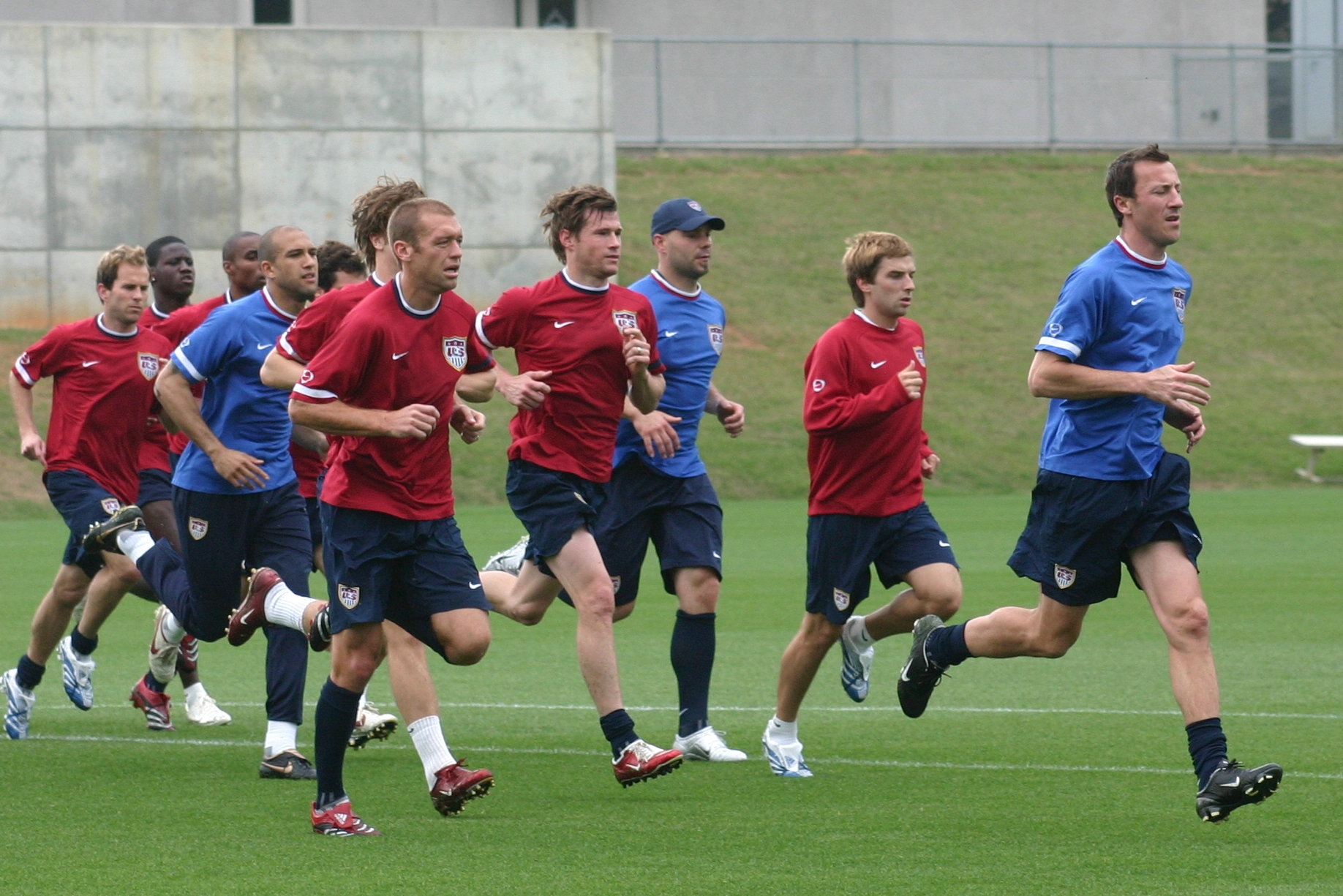
USA players training during the 2006 World Cup.

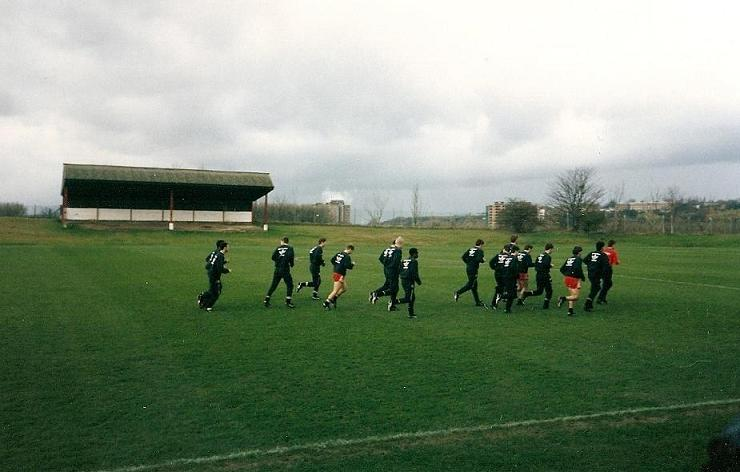
Manchester United players training at The Cliff, 1992

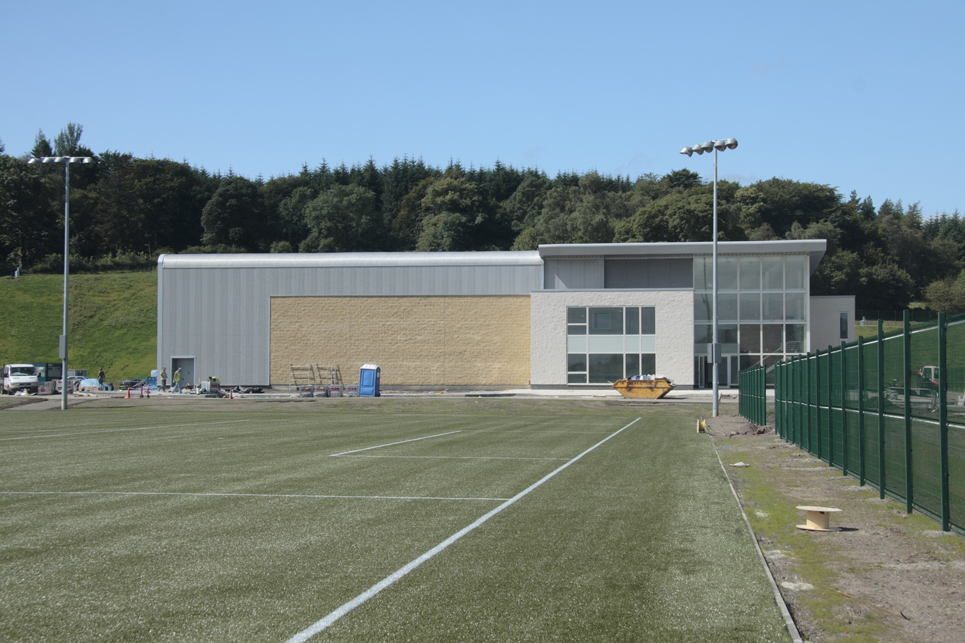
Lennoxtown, the training ground of Celtic F.C.

== See also ==
- Professional football training exercises and sessions
- Football (soccer) tactics and skills
