= Daniel Stefański =

Polish football referee (born 1977)

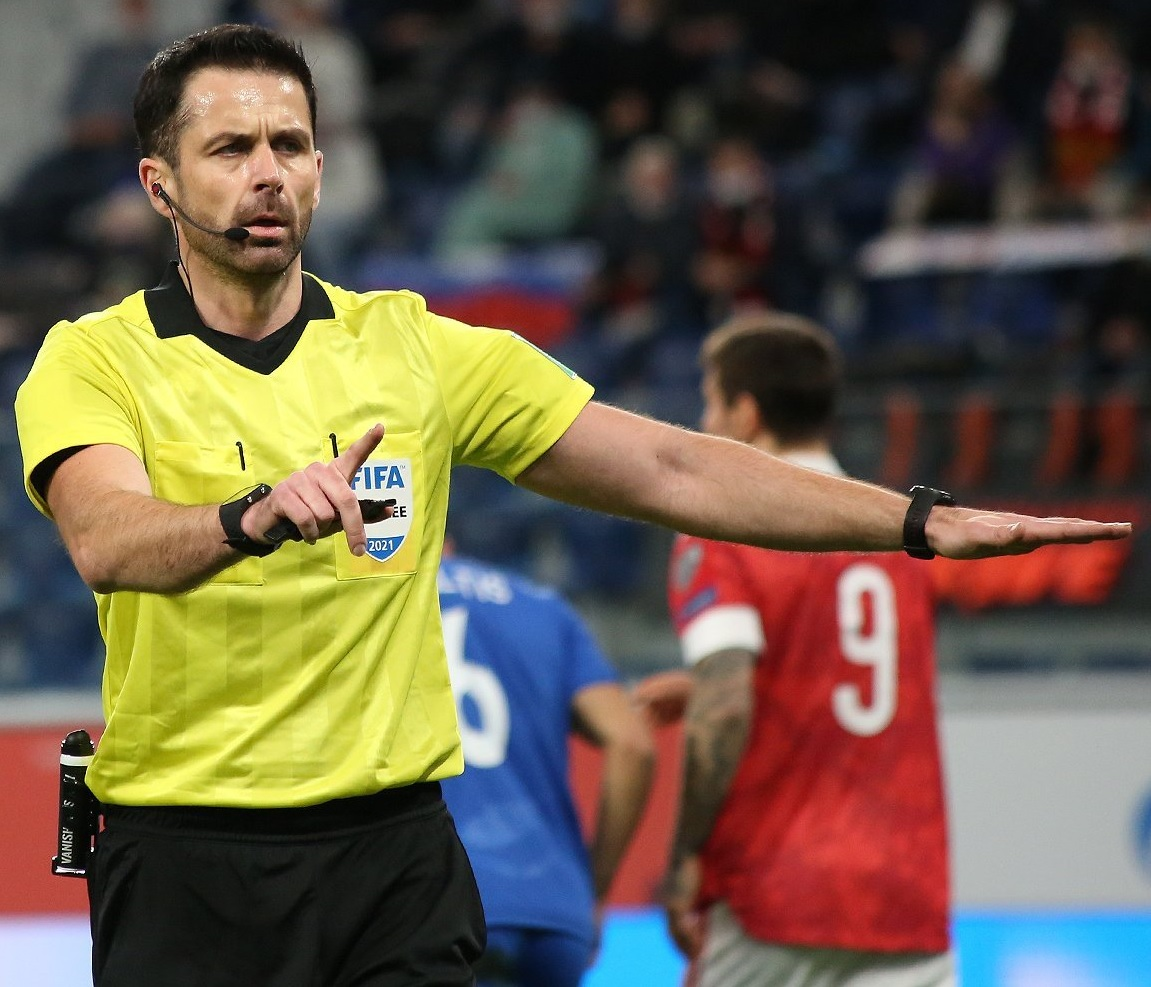
- Stefański in 2021
- Full name: Daniel Bogdan Stefański
- Born: 7 July 1977 (age 49); Bydgoszcz, Poland

Domestic
Years	League	Role
2009–	Ekstraklasa	Referee

International
Years	League	Role
2013–	FIFA listed	Referee

Daniel Bogdan Stefański (born 7 July 1977) is a Polish football referee who officiates in the Ekstraklasa. He has been a FIFA referee since 2013, and is ranked as a UEFA first category referee.

== Refereeing career ==
In 2009, Stefański began officiating in the Ekstraklasa. His first match as referee was on 14 August 2009 between Ruch Chorzów and Arka Gdynia. In 2013, he was put on the FIFA referees list. He officiated his first senior international match on 15 October 2013 between Hungary and Andorra in 2014 FIFA World Cup qualification.

In 2015, he was selected to officiate the 2015 Polish Cup Final between Lech Poznań and Legia Warsaw. Stefański has officiated matches in various other countries, including Japan (in the 2017 J1 League), Saudi Arabia (in the Saudi Professional League) and Switzerland (in the 2016–17 Swiss Super League).
