= 2017–18 Lech Poznań season =

Lech Poznań
2017–18 season
- Chairman: Karol Klimczak
- Manager: Rafał Ulatowski (From 10 May 2018); Nenad Bjelica (Until 10 May 2018)
- Stadium: INEA Stadion
- Ekstraklasa: 3rd
- Polish Cup: Round of 32
- UEFA Europa League: Third qualifying round
- Top goalscorer: League: Christian Gytkjær (19 goals); All: Christian Gytkjær (21 goals)
- Highest home attendance: Ekstraklasa: 36,941 vs. Górnik (7 April 2018)
- Lowest home attendance: Ekstraklasa: 4,376 vs. Śląsk (28 February 2018)
- Average home league attendance: 20,697
Home colours	Away colours
- All statistics correct as of 24 May 2018.

Lech Poznań is a Polish football club based in Poznań. This was their 95th season overall. They competed in Ekstraklasa, the highest ranking league in Poland.

== Squad ==
As of 11 February 2018.

Note: Flags indicate national team as defined under FIFA eligibility rules; some limited exceptions apply. Players may hold more than one non-FIFA nationality.

No.	Pos.	Nation	Player
1	GK	BIH	Jasmin Burić
2	DF	POL	Robert Gumny
4	DF	NOR	Thomas Rogne
6	MF	POL	Łukasz Trałka
7	MF	POL	Maciej Gajos (Captain)
10	MF	SUI	Darko Jevtić
11	FW	UKR	Oleksiy Khoblenko (on loan from (Ukraine) Chornomorets Odesa)
13	DF	MNE	Nikola Vujadinović
14	FW	BIH	Elvir Koljić (on loan from (Bosnia and Herzegovina) Krupa)
15	MF	POL	Jakub Moder
16	MF	CRO	Mario Šitum (on loan from (Croatia) Dinamo Zagreb)
17	MF	POL	Maciej Makuszewski
18	MF	ROU	Mihai Răduț
19	DF	ARG	Vernon De Marco (on loan from (Slovakia) Slovan Bratislava)

No.	Pos.	Nation	Player
21	MF	POL	Jakub Serafin
22	DF	UKR	Volodymyr Kostevych
23	MF	SWE	Nicklas Bärkroth
26	DF	POL	Rafał Janicki (on loan from Lechia Gdańsk)
29	MF	POL	Kamil Jóźwiak
30	GK	SVK	Matúš Putnocký
31	GK	POL	Bartosz Mrozek
32	FW	DEN	Christian Gytkjær
34	MF	POL	Tymoteusz Klupś
36	GK	POL	Bartosz Przybysz
66	DF	AUT	Emir Dilaver
77	DF	POL	Piotr Tomasik
86	MF	POL	Radosław Majewski

=== Out on loan ===
Note: Flags indicate national team as defined under FIFA eligibility rules; some limited exceptions apply. Players may hold more than one non-FIFA nationality.

No.	Pos.	Nation	Player
8	MF	POL	Szymon Pawłowski (at Bruk-Bet Termalica Nieciecza until 30 June 2018)
20	MF	POL	Dariusz Formella (at Raków Częstochowa until 30 June 2018)
24	FW	POL	Dawid Kurminowski (at (Slovakia) Zemplín Michalovce until 31 December 2018)
25	FW	POL	Paweł Tomczyk (at Podbeskidzie Bielsko-Biała until 30 June 2018)

No.	Pos.	Nation	Player
27	DF	POL	Tymoteusz Puchacz (at Zagłębie Sosnowiec until 30 June 2018)
28	DF	POL	Marcin Wasielewski (at Znicz Pruszków until 30 June 2018)
33	GK	POL	Miłosz Mleczko (at Puszcza Niepołomice until 30 June 2019)
34	FW	POL	Piotr Kurbiel (at Olimpia Elbląg until 30 June 2018)
36	GK	POL	Mateusz Lis (at Raków Częstochowa until 30 June 2018)

== Transfer ==
=== Summer transfer window ===
==== In ====
No.	Pos.	Nat.	Name	Age	EU	Moving from	Type	Transfer window	Ends	Transfer fee	Source
23	MF	(Sweden)	Nicklas Bärkroth	25	EU	(Sweden) IFK Norrköping	Transfer	Summer	2021	€650,000	
19	DF	(Spain) (Argentina)	Vernon De Marco	24	EU	(Slovakia) Slovan Bratislava	Loan	Summer	2018	Free	
66	DF	(Austria) (Bosnia and Herzegovina)	Emir Dilaver	26	EU	(Hungary) Ferencváros	Transfer	Summer	2021	Free	
26	MF	(Poland)	Szymon Drewniak	23	EU	Górnik Łęczna	End of loan	Summer	2016	Free	
20	MF	(Poland)	Dariusz Formella	21	EU	Arka Gdynia	End of loan	Summer	2019	Free	
2	DF	(Poland)	Robert Gumny	19	EU	Podbeskidzie Bielsko-Biała	End of loan	Summer	2019	Free	
32	FW	(Denmark)	Christian Gytkjær	27	EU	(Germany) TSV 1860 Munich	Transfer	Summer	2019	Free	
26	DF	(Poland)	Rafał Janicki	25	EU	Lechia Gdańsk	Loan	Summer	2019	Free	
29	MF	(Poland)	Kamil Jóźwiak	19	EU	GKS Katowice	End of loan	Summer	2019	Free	
77	MF	(Norway) (The Gambia)	Muhamed Keita	26	Non-EU	(Norway) Vålerenga	End of loan	Summer	2017	Free	
34	FW	(Poland)	Piotr Kurbiel	21	EU	Pogoń Siedlce	End of loan	Summer	Undisclosed	Free	
24	FW	(Poland)	Dawid Kurminowski	18	EU	Lech II Poznań	Transfer	Summer	2021	Youth system	
17	MF	(Poland)	Maciej Makuszewski	27	EU	Lechia Gdańsk	Transfer	Summer	2020	€300,000	
15	MF	(Poland)	Jakub Moder	18	EU	Lech II Poznań	Transfer	Summer	2020	Youth system	
92	FW	(Latvia)	Deniss Rakels	24	EU	(England) Reading	Loan	Summer	2018	Free	
21	MF	(Poland)	Jakub Serafin	20	EU	Bytovia Bytów	End of loan	Summer	2020	Free	
16	MF	(Croatia)	Mario Šitum	25	EU	(Croatia) Dinamo Zagreb	Loan	Summer	2018	€100,000	
13	DF	(Montenegro) (Bulgaria)	Nikola Vujadinović	30	EU	(Spain) Osasuna	Transfer	Summer	2019	Free	

Total spending: ▼€1,050,000

==== Out ====
No.	Pos.	Nat.	Name	Age	EU	Moving to	Type	Transfer window	Transfer fee	Source
35	DF	(Poland)	Jan Bednarek	21	EU	(England) Southampton	Transfer	Summer	€6,000,000	
26	MF	(Poland)	Szymon Drewniak	23	EU	Cracovia	Transfer	Summer	€60,000	
15	DF	(Poland)	Dariusz Dudka	33	EU	Lech II Poznań	Loan	Summer	Free	
20	MF	(Poland)	Dariusz Formella	21	EU	Pogoń Szczecin	Loan	Summer	Free	
21	MF	(Colombia)	Víctor Gutiérrez	21	Non-EU	Lech II Poznań	Loan	Summer	Free	
77	MF	(Norway) (The Gambia)	Muhamed Keita	26	Non-EU	(United States) New York Red Bulls	Transfer	Summer	Free	
4	DF	(Poland)	Tomasz Kędziora	23	EU	(Ukraine) Dynamo Kyiv	Transfer	Summer	€1,500,000	
44	DF	(Croatia)	Elvis Kokalović	28	EU		End of contract	Summer	Free	
9	FW	(Poland)	Dawid Kownacki	20	EU	(Italy) Sampdoria	Transfer	Summer	€4,000,000	
34	FW	(Poland)	Piotr Kurbiel	21	EU	Olimpia Elbląg	Loan	Summer	Free	
8	MF	(Poland)	Szymon Pawłowski	30	EU	Bruk-Bet Termalica Nieciecza	Loan	Summer	Free	
11	FW	(Poland)	Marcin Robak	34	EU	Śląsk Wrocław	Transfer	Summer	€75,000	
21	MF	(Poland)	Jakub Serafin	21	EU	(Norway) Haugesund	Loan	Summer	Free	
25	FW	(Poland)	Paweł Tomczyk	19	EU	Podbeskidzie Bielsko-Biała	Loan	Summer	Free	
26	DF	(Poland)	Maciej Wilusz	28	EU	(Russia) Rostov	End of contract	Summer	Free	

Total income: ▲€11,635,000

Total expenditure: ▲€10,585,000

=== Winter transfer window ===
==== In ====
No.	Pos.	Nat.	Name	Age	EU	Moving from	Type	Transfer window	Ends	Transfer fee	Source
20	MF	(Poland)	Dariusz Formella	22	EU	Pogoń Szczecin	Loan return	Winter	2019	Free	
11	FW	(Ukraine)	Oleksiy Khoblenko	23	Non-EU	(Ukraine) Chornomorets Odesa	Loan	Winter	2018	Free	
34	MF	(Poland)	Tymoteusz Klupś	17	EU		Transfer	Winter	Undisclosed	Youth system	
14	FW	(Bosnia and Herzegovina)	Elvir Koljić	22	Non-EU	(Bosnia and Herzegovina) Krupa	Loan	Winter	2018	Free	
31	GK	(Poland)	Bartosz Mrozek	17	EU		Transfer	Winter	2020	Youth system	
36	GK	(Poland)	Bartosz Przybysz	17	EU		Transfer	Winter	Undisclosed	Youth system	
4	DF	(Norway)	Thomas Rogne	27	Non-EU	(Sweden) IFK Göteborg	Transfer	Winter	2022	Free	
21	MF	(Poland)	Jakub Serafin	21	EU	(Norway) Haugesund	End of loan	Winter	2020	Free	
77	DF	(Poland)	Piotr Tomasik	30	EU	Jagiellonia Białystok	Transfer	Winter	2021	€125,000	

Total spending: ▼€125,000

==== Out ====
No.	Pos.	Nat.	Name	Age	EU	Moving to	Type	Transfer window	Transfer fee	Source
5	MF	(Ghana)	Abdul Aziz Tetteh	27	Non-EU	(Russia) Dynamo Moscow	Transfer	Winter	€800,000	
14	FW	(Denmark)	Nicki Bille Nielsen	29	EU	(Greece) Panionios	Transfer	Winter	Free	
20	MF	(Poland)	Dariusz Formella	22	EU	Raków Częstochowa	Loan	Winter	Free	
24	FW	(Poland)	Dawid Kurminowski	18	EU	(Slovakia) Zemplín Michalovce	Loan	Winter	Free	
33	GK	(Poland)	Miłosz Mleczko	18	EU	Puszcza Niepołomice	Loan	Winter	Free	
3	DF	(Denmark)	Lasse Nielsen	30	EU	(Sweden) Trelleborg	Transfer	Winter	€50,000	
27	DF	(Poland)	Tymoteusz Puchacz	18	EU	Zagłębie Sosnowiec	Loan	Winter	Free	
92	FW	(Latvia)	Deniss Rakels	25	EU	(England) Reading	End of loan	Winter	Free	
28	DF	(Poland)	Marcin Wasielewski	23	EU	Znicz Pruszków	Loan	Winter	Free	

Total income: ▲€850,000

Total expenditure: ▲€725,000

== Friendlies ==
Win Draw Loss

23 June 2017 Club friendly	Lech Poznań	3–0	(Israel) Hapoel Be'er Sheva	Poznań
18:35 CEST (UTC+02:00)	Gumny 4'; L. Nielsen 29'; Šitum 60'	Report		Stadium: INEA Stadion; Attendance: 1,000

8 July 2017 Club friendly	Lech Poznań	8–1	Górnik Konin	Poznań
16:00 CEST (UTC+02:00)	Jóźwiak 18'; Moder 27'; Gytkjær 36'; Rakels 41', 83' (pen.); Robak 66', 72'; Kurminowski 75'	Report	Adamczewski 43' (pen.)	Stadium: Lech Poznań training ground

3 September 2017 Club friendly	Lech Poznań	1–0	Poland U-21	Grodzisk Wielkopolski
17:00 CEST (UTC+02:00)	Trałka 61'	Report		Stadium: Dyskobolia Stadium; Attendance: 0

8 October 2017 Club friendly	Lech Poznań	1–1	(Belarus) Dinamo Brest	Poznań
12:00 CEST (UTC+02:00)	Gytkjær 6' (pen.)	Report	Milevskyi 49'	Stadium: Lech Poznań training ground

11 November 2017 Club friendly	Tarnovia Tarnowo Podgórne	0–7	Lech Poznań	Tarnowo Podgórne
12:00 CET (UTC+01:00)		Report	N. Nielsen 30', 35', 40', 80'; Tetteh 58'; Kaliszan 71' (o.g.); Răduț 72'	Stadium: Stadion Tarnovii

14 January 2018 Club friendly	Lech Poznań	4–3	Polonia Środa Wielkopolska	Poznań
12:00 CET (UTC+01:00)	Gytkjær 8'; Majewski 15'; Jevtić 68'; Šitum 80'	Report	Pińczuk 76'; Łopatka 83', 85'	Stadium: Lech Poznań training ground Attendance: 0

19 January 2018 Club friendly	Lech Poznań	3–1	(Ukraine) Zorya Luhansk	Kadriye, Turkey
14:00 CET (UTC+01:00)	Šitum 35'; Gytkjær 45' (pen.); Jóźwiak 87'	Report	Iury 63'	Stadium: Papillon Sports Center

23 January 2018 Club friendly	Lech Poznań	4–3	(Bulgaria) Etar	Kadriye, Turkey
16:00 CET (UTC+01:00)	Jevtić 29' (pen.); Wasielewski 50'; Šitum 75'; Gytkjær 83'	Report	Stoyanov 26', 40' (pen.); Batrović 36'	Stadium: Papillon Sports Center

26 January 2018 Club friendly	Lech Poznań	0–1	(Croatia) Hajduk Split	Kadriye, Turkey
16:00 CET (UTC+01:00)		Report	Nižić 58'	Stadium: Papillon Sports Center

4 February 2018 Club friendly	Lech Poznań	2–0	GKS Tychy	Poznań
13:00 CET (UTC+01:00)	Jevtić 35'; Khoblenko 85' (pen.)	Report		Stadium: Lech Poznań training ground

7 February 2018 Club friendly	Lech Poznań	3–0	Znicz Pruszków	Poznań
13:00 CET (UTC+01:00)	Moder 5'; Khoblenko 63'; Vujadinović 68'	Report		Stadium: Lech Poznań training ground

24 March 2018 Club friendly	Lech Poznań	2–1	Chrobry Głogów	Poznań
13:00 CET (UTC+01:00)	Jevtić 17'; Khoblenko 54'	Report	Ilków-Gołąb 66'	Stadium: Lech Poznań training ground Referee: Szymon Lizak (Poznań)

== Competitions ==
Win Draw Loss

=== Overall ===
Competition	Started round	Current position / round	Final position / round	First match	Last match
2017–18 Ekstraklasa	—	3rd		16 July 2017	20 May 2018
2017–18 Polish Cup	Round of 32	—	Round of 32	9 August 2017	9 August 2017
UEFA Europa League	First qualifying round	—	Third qualifying round	29 June 2017	3 August 2017

Updated to match played 24 May 2018
Source: Competitions

=== Overview ===
Competition	Record							
Competition	G	W	D	L	GF	GA	GD	Win %
Ekstraklasa	37	16	12	9	53	34	+19	43.24
Polish Cup	1	0	0	1	0	3	−3	0.00
UEFA Europa League	6	3	2	1	13	5	+8	50.00
Total	44	19	14	11	66	42	+24	43.18

Updated to match played 24 May 2018
Source: Competitions

=== Ekstraklasa ===
==== Regular season ====
===== League table =====
Pos	Team	Pld	W	D	L	GF	GA	GD	Pts	Qualification
1	Lech Poznań	30	15	10	5	49	23	+26	55	Qualification for the Championship round
2	Jagiellonia Białystok	30	16	6	8	45	36	+9	54 (Note: Head-to-head record: Jagiellonia 1–0 Legia, Legia 0–2 Jagiellonia.)	Qualification for the Championship round
3	Legia Warsaw	30	17	3	10	43	31	+12	54	Qualification for the Championship round
4	Wisła Płock	30	15	4	11	42	35	+7	49	Qualification for the Championship round
5	Górnik Zabrze (Note: Górnik Zabrze were punished after the 26th round with a deduction of three points because of stadium destruction by the fans. The appeal against the penalty has been accepted on 22 March 2018.)	30	12	11	7	56	46	+10	47	Qualification for the Championship round

Source: Ekstraklasa, 90minut
Rules for classification: 1) Points; 2) Head-to-head points; 3) Head-to-head goal difference; 4) Head-to-head goals scored; 5) Head-to-head away goals scored (only if two teams); 6) Goal difference; 7) Goals scored; 8) Fairplay ranking; 9) Draw. (Note: Head-to-head record is used only after all the matches between the teams in question have been played.)

===== Results summary =====
Overall								Home						Away					
Pld	W	D	L	GF	GA	GD	Pts	W	D	L	GF	GA	GD	W	D	L	GF	GA	GD
30	15	10	5	49	23	+26	55	12	3	0	35	8	+27	3	7	5	14	15	−1

Last updated: 7 April 2018.
Source: 90minut.pl

===== Results by round =====
Round	1	2	3	4	5	6	7	8	9	10	11	12	13	14	15	16	17	18	19	20	21	22	23	24	25	26	27	28	29	30
Ground	H	A	H	A	H	A	H	A	H	A	H	A	A	H	A	A	H	A	H	A	H	A	H	A	H	A	H	H	A	H
Result	D	L	W	W	D	W	W	D	W	L	W	D	D	D	L	D	W	D	W	D	W	D	W	L	W	L	W	W	W	W
Position	9	13	6	4	4	4	1	1	1	3	2	1	1	3	5	6	4	5	4	4	2	3	3	3	3	3	3	3	2	1

Updated to match(es) played on 7 April 2018. Source: 90minut.pl
A = Away; H = Home; W = Win; D = Draw; L = Loss

===== Matches =====
Win Draw Loss

16 July 2017 Match 1	Lech Poznań	0–0	Sandecja Nowy Sącz	Poznań
18:00 CEST (UTC+02:00)		Report		Stadium: INEA Stadion; Attendance: 18,667; Referee: Paweł Gil (Lublin)

23 July 2017 Match 2	Wisła Płock	1–0	Lech Poznań	Płock
15:30 CEST (UTC+02:00)	Furman 66'	Report		Stadium: Kazimierz Górski Stadium; Attendance: 6,511; Referee: Paweł Gil (Lublin)

30 July 2017 Match 3	Lech Poznań	5–1	Piast Gliwice	Poznań
18:00 CEST (UTC+02:00)	N. Nielsen 40' (pen.); Makuszewski 44'; Gytkjær 78', 85'; Trałka 83'	Report	Barišić 62'	Stadium: INEA Stadion; Attendance: 13,783; Referee: Daniel Stefański (Bydgoszcz)

6 August 2017 Match 4	Cracovia	0–2	Lech Poznań	Kraków
18:00 CEST (UTC+02:00)		Report	Jóźwiak 82'; Gytkjær 84'	Stadium: Marshal Józef Piłsudski Stadium; Attendance: 9,114; Referee: Jarosław Przybył (Kluczbork)

12 August 2017 Match 5	Lech Poznań	1–1	Zagłębie Lubin	Poznań
18:00 CEST (UTC+02:00)	Šitum 53'	Report	Czerwiński 81'	Stadium: INEA Stadion; Attendance: 15,121; Referee: Szymon Marciniak (Płock)

20 August 2017 Match 6	Bruk-Bet Termalica Nieciecza	1–3	Lech Poznań	Nieciecza
18:00 CEST (UTC+02:00)	L. Nielsen 83' (o.g.)	Report	Gytkjær 44'; Putivtsev 60' (o.g.); Majewski 87'	Stadium: Stadion Termaliki Bruk-Bet; Attendance: 4,381; Referee: Tomasz Musiał (Kraków)

27 August 2017 Match 7	Lech Poznań	3–0	Arka Gdynia	Poznań
15:30 CEST (UTC+02:00)	Gajos 20'; Makuszewski 74'; Šitum 83'	Report		Stadium: INEA Stadion; Attendance: 20,574; Referee: Tomasz Kwiatkowski (Warsaw)

10 September 2017 Match 8	Pogoń Szczecin	0–0	Lech Poznań	Szczecin
18:00 CEST (UTC+02:00)		Report		Stadium: Stadion Miejski im. Floriana Krygiera; Attendance: 10,695; Referee: Szymon Marciniak (Płock)

15 September 2017 Match 9	Lech Poznań	1–0	Korona Kielce	Poznań
20:30 CEST (UTC+02:00)	Trałka 35'	Report		Stadium: INEA Stadion; Attendance: 20,581; Referee: Daniel Stefański (Bydgoszcz)

22 September 2017 Match 10	Śląsk Wrocław	2–0	Lech Poznań	Wrocław
20:30 CEST (UTC+02:00)	Pich 25'; Robak 45' (pen.)	Report		Stadium: Stadion Miejski; Attendance: 22,075; Referee: Paweł Gil (Lublin)

1 October 2017 Match 11	Lech Poznań	3–0	Legia Warsaw	Poznań
18:00 CEST (UTC+02:00)	Gajos 12'; Trałka 38'; Makuszewski 65'	Report		Stadium: INEA Stadion; Attendance: 36,829; Referee: Szymon Marciniak (Płock)

13 October 2017 Match 12	Jagiellonia Białystok	1–1	Lech Poznań	Białystok
20:45 CEST (UTC+02:00)	Novikovas 87'	Report	Jevtić 27'	Stadium: Stadion Miejski; Attendance: 12,156; Referee: Szymon Marciniak (Płock)

21 October 2017 Match 13	Lechia Gdańsk	3–3	Lech Poznań	Gdańsk
20:30 CEST (UTC+02:00)	Augustyn 13'; M. Paixão 45' (pen.); Dilaver 76' (o.g.)	Report	Gajos 37'; Gytkjær 70'; Makuszewski 72'	Stadium: Stadion Energa; Attendance: 13,493; Referee: Tomasz Musiał (Kraków)

27 October 2017 Match 14	Lech Poznań	1–1	Wisła Kraków	Poznań
20:30 CEST (UTC+02:00)	Jevtić 90+4'	Report	Carlitos 8'	Stadium: INEA Stadion; Attendance: 26,361; Referee: Daniel Stefański (Bydgoszcz)

4 November 2017 Match 15	Górnik Zabrze	3–1	Lech Poznań	Zabrze
20:30 CET (UTC+01:00)	Angulo 13' (pen.), 75'; Żurkowski 34'	Report	Gytkjær 62'	Stadium: Ernest Pohl Stadium; Attendance: 24,563; Referee: Bartosz Frankowski (Toruń)

18 November 2017 Match 16	Sandecja Nowy Sącz	0–0	Lech Poznań	Nieciecza
18:00 CET (UTC+01:00)		Report		Stadium: Stadion Termaliki Bruk-Bet; Attendance: 2,544; Referee: Krzysztof Jakubik (Siedlce)

26 November 2017 Match 17	Lech Poznań	2–1	Wisła Płock	Poznań
15:30 CET (UTC+01:00)	Makuszewski 13'; Gytkjær 45'	Report	Štilić 36'	Stadium: INEA Stadion; Attendance: 13,587; Referee: Tomasz Musiał (Kraków)

3 December 2017 Match 18	Piast Gliwice	0–0	Lech Poznań	Gliwice
15:30 CET (UTC+01:00)		Report		Stadium: Stadion Piast; Attendance: 4,560; Referee: Bartosz Frankowski (Toruń)

10 December 2017 Match 19	Lech Poznań	1–0	Cracovia	Poznań
18:00 CET (UTC+01:00)	Dilaver 38'	Report		Stadium: INEA Stadion; Attendance: 20,692; Referee: Mariusz Złotek (Stalowa Wola)

13 December 2017 Match 20	Zagłębie Lubin	0–0	Lech Poznań	Lubin
18:00 CET (UTC+01:00)		Report		Stadium: Stadion Zagłębia; Attendance: 7,629; Referee: Jarosław Przybył (Kluczbork)

17 December 2017 Match 21	Lech Poznań	3–1	Bruk-Bet Termalica Nieciecza	Poznań
15:30 CET (UTC+01:00)	Gytkjær 36', 38', 80'	Report	Putivtsev 74'	Stadium: INEA Stadion; Attendance: 8,102; Referee: Paweł Gil (Lublin)

11 February 2018 Match 22	Arka Gdynia	0–0	Lech Poznań	Gdynia
18:00 CET (UTC+01:00)		Report		Stadium: Stadion GOSiR; Attendance: 12,568; Referee: Bartosz Frankowski (Toruń)

18 February 2018 Match 23	Lech Poznań	2–0	Pogoń Szczecin	Poznań
18:00 CET (UTC+01:00)	Jevtić 20'; Dilaver 81'	Report		Stadium: INEA Stadion; Attendance: 14,348; Referee: Paweł Raczkowski (Warsaw)

25 February 2018 Match 24	Korona Kielce	1–0	Lech Poznań	Kielce
18:00 CET (UTC+01:00)	Gumny 69' (o.g.)	Report		Stadium: Stadion Miejski; Attendance: 6,853; Referee: Mariusz Złotek (Stalowa Wola)

28 February 2018 Match 25	Lech Poznań	2–1	Śląsk Wrocław	Poznań
20:30 CET (UTC+01:00)	Khoblenko 80'; Gytkjær 89'	Report	Robak 82'	Stadium: INEA Stadion; Attendance: 4,376; Referee: Bartosz Frankowski (Toruń)

4 March 2018 Match 26	Legia Warsaw	2–1	Lech Poznań	Warsaw
18:00 CET (UTC+01:00)	Vešović 2'; Kucharczyk 86' (pen.)	Report	Gytkjær 63'	Stadium: Polish Army Stadium; Attendance: 22,892; Referee: Szymon Marciniak (Płock)

11 March 2018 Match 27	Lech Poznań	5–1	Jagiellonia Białystok	Poznań
15:30 CET (UTC+01:00)	Gytkjær 39'; Dilaver 54'; Jevtić 78' (pen.); Jóźwiak 85'; Trałka 89'	Report	Novikovas 18'	Stadium: INEA Stadion; Attendance: 28,587; Referee: Tomasz Musiał (Kraków)

16 March 2018 Match 28	Lech Poznań	3–0	Lechia Gdańsk	Poznań
20:30 CET (UTC+01:00)	Trałka 17'; Gytkjær 45'; Jevtić 55'	Report		Stadium: INEA Stadion; Attendance: 14,104; Referee: Daniel Stefański (Bydgoszcz)

2 April 2018 Match 29	Wisła Kraków	1–3	Lech Poznań	Kraków
18:00 CEST (UTC+02:00)	Carlitos 30'	Report	Gytkjær 43' (pen.), 52', 83'	Stadium: Stadion Miejski im. Henryka Reymana; Attendance: 20,053; Referee: Jarosław Przybył (Kluczbork)

7 April 2018 Match 30	Lech Poznań	3–1	Górnik Zabrze	Poznań
18:00 CEST (UTC+02:00)	Jóźwiak 45'; Trałka 81'; Majewski 90'	Report	Kądzior 76' (pen.)	Stadium: INEA Stadion; Attendance: 36,941; Referee: Bartosz Frankowski (Toruń)

==== Championship round ====
===== League table =====
Pos	Team	Pld	W	D	L	GF	GA	GD	Pts	Qualification
1	Legia Warsaw (C)	37	22	4	11	55	35	+20	70	Qualification for the Champions League first qualifying round
2	Jagiellonia Białystok	37	20	7	10	55	41	+14	67	Qualification for the Europa League second qualifying round
3	Lech Poznań	37	16	12	9	53	34	+19	60	Qualification for the Europa League first qualifying round
4	Górnik Zabrze	37	16	12	9	68	54	+14	60	Qualification for the Europa League first qualifying round
5	Wisła Płock	37	17	6	14	53	45	+8	57	

Source: Ekstraklasa, 90minut
Rules for classification: 1) Points; 2) Points in regular season; 3) Head-to-head points in regular season; 4) Head-to-head goal difference in regular season; 5) Head-to-head goals scored in regular season; 5) Head-to-head away goals scored in regular season (if only two teams); 7) Goal difference; 8) Goals scored; 9) Fairplay ranking; 10) Play-off (only if needed to decide champion, teams for relegation or teams for UEFA competitions).
(C) Champions

===== Results summary =====
Overall								Home						Away					
Pld	W	D	L	GF	GA	GD	Pts	W	D	L	GF	GA	GD	W	D	L	GF	GA	GD
37	16	12	9	53	34	+19	60	12	3	4	37	18	+19	4	9	5	16	16	0

Last updated: 24 May 2018.
Source: 90minut.pl

===== Results by round =====
Round	1	2	3	4	5	6	7
Ground	H	A	H	A	H	A	H
Result	L	W	L	D	L	D	L
Position	1	1	2	2	3	3	3

Updated to match(es) played on 24 May 2018. Source: 90minut.pl
A = Away; H = Home; W = Win; D = Draw; L = Loss

===== Matches =====
Win Draw Loss

13 April 2018 Match 31	Lech Poznań	0–1	Korona Kielce	Poznań
20:30 CEST (UTC+02:00)		Report	Kapidžić 35'	Stadium: INEA Stadion; Attendance: 20,054; Referee: Krzysztof Jakubik (Siedlce)

20 April 2018 Match 32	Zagłębie Lubin	0–1	Lech Poznań	Lubin
20:30 CEST (UTC+02:00)		Report	Gytkjær 52'	Stadium: Stadion Zagłębia; Attendance: 12,721; Referee: Daniel Stefański (Bydgoszcz)

28 April 2018 Match 33	Lech Poznań	2–4	Górnik Zabrze	Poznań
20:30 CEST (UTC+02:00)	Khoblenko 75'; Gajos 90+2'	Report	Urynowicz 18'; Wieteska 35'; Matuszek 68'; Kądzior 73'	Stadium: INEA Stadion; Attendance: 28,629; Referee: Bartosz Frankowski (Toruń)

5 May 2018 Match 34	Wisła Płock	0–0	Lech Poznań	Płock
20:30 CEST (UTC+02:00)		Report		Stadium: Kazimierz Górski Stadium; Attendance: 10,021; Referee: Tomasz Kwiatkowski (Warsaw)

9 May 2018 Match 35	Lech Poznań	0–2	Jagiellonia Białystok	Poznań
20:30 CEST (UTC+02:00)		Report	Sheridan 16'; Kwiecień 56'	Stadium: INEA Stadion; Attendance: 24,288; Referee: Piotr Lasyk (Bytom)

13 May 2018 Match 36	Wisła Kraków	1–1	Lech Poznań	Kraków
18:00 CEST (UTC+02:00)	Brożek 90+10'	Report	Gytkjær 49'	Stadium: Stadion Miejski im. Henryka Reymana; Attendance: 20,823; Referee: Krzysztof Jakubik (Siedlce)

20 May 2018 Match 37	Lech Poznań	0–3 (w/o)	Legia Warsaw	Poznań
18:00 CEST (UTC+02:00)		Report; Report	Antolić 9'; Kucharczyk 69'	Stadium: INEA Stadion; Attendance: 27,617; Referee: Daniel Stefański (Bydgoszcz)
Note: The match was abandoned after 76 minutes due to the intrusion of fans on the pitch and has been verified as a 0–3 victory of Legia Warsaw.

=== Polish Cup ===
9 August 2017 Round of 32	Pogoń Szczecin	3–0	Lech Poznań	Szczecin
20:00 CEST (UTC+02:00)	Kort 37', 77'; Frączczak 45' (pen.)	Report		Stadium: Stadion Miejski im. Floriana Krygiera; Attendance: 5,903; Referee: Krzysztof Jakubik (Siedlce)

=== UEFA Europa League ===
==== First qualifying round ====
29 June 2017 First leg	Lech Poznań (Poland)	4–0	(North Macedonia) Pelister	Poznań, Poland
20:45 CEST (UTC+02:00)	N. Nielsen 28' (pen.); Šitum 30', 57'; Majewski 38'	Report		Stadium: INEA Stadion; Attendance: 18,215; Referee: Luís Godinho (Portugal)

6 July 2017 Second leg	Pelister (North Macedonia)	0–3 (0–7 agg.)	(Poland) Lech Poznań	Strumica, FYR Macedonia
CEST (UTC+02:00)		Report	Trałka 39'; Jevtić 66'; Jóźwiak 77'	Stadium: Stadion Mladost; Attendance: 750; Referee: François Letexier (France)

==== Second qualifying round ====
13 July 2017 First leg	Haugesund (Norway)	3–2	(Poland) Lech Poznań	Haugesund, Norway
19:00 CEST (UTC+2)	Abdi 24'; Hajradinović 71'; Ibrahim 73'	Report	Majewski 75'; Jevtić 90+3' (pen.)	Stadium: Haugesund Stadion; Attendance: 4,011; Referee: Alain Bieri (Switzerland)

20 July 2017 Second leg	Lech Poznań (Poland)	2–0 (4–3 agg.)	(Norway) Haugesund	Poznań, Poland
20:00 CEST (UTC+2)	Jevtić 32'; N. Nielsen 90+3'	Report		Stadium: INEA Stadion; Attendance: 21,968; Referee: Alexander Harkam (Austria)

==== Third qualifying round ====
27 July 2017 First leg	Utrecht (Netherlands)	0–0	(Poland) Lech Poznań	Utrecht, Netherlands
19:00 CEST (UTC+2)		Report		Stadium: Stadion Galgenwaard; Attendance: 13,817; Referee: Aleksandar Stavrev (Macedonia)

3 August 2017 Second leg	Lech Poznań (Poland)	2–2 (2–2 agg.)	(Netherlands) Utrecht	Poznań, Poland
20:15 CEST (UTC+2)	Gytkjær 26', 90+4'	Report	Kerk 1'; Dessers 89'	Stadium: INEA Stadion; Attendance: 33,446; Referee: Mads-Kristoffer Kristoffersen (Denmark)

== Squad statistics ==
=== Appearances and goals ===
As of end of 2017–18 season.

No.	Pos	Player	Ekstraklasa		Polish Cup		UEFA Europa League		Total	
No.	Pos	Player	Apps	Goals	Apps	Goals	Apps	Goals	Apps	Goals
Goalkeepers
1	GK	(Bosnia and Herzegovina) Jasmin Burić	12	0	1	0	1	0	14	0
30	GK	(Slovakia) Matúš Putnocký	25+1	0	0	0	5	0	31	0
31	GK	(Poland) Bartosz Mrozek	0	0	0	0	0	0	0	0
36	GK	(Poland) Bartosz Przybysz	0	0	0	0	0	0	0	0
Defenders
2	DF	(Poland) Robert Gumny	33	0	0	0	4+1	0	38	0
4	DF	(Norway) Thomas Rogne	0	0	0	0	0	0	0	0
13	DF	(Montenegro) Nikola Vujadinović	14	0	1	0	2	0	17	0
19	DF	(Argentina) Vernon De Marco	1+1	0	0	0	0	0	2	0
22	DF	(Ukraine) Volodymyr Kostevych	30	0	1	0	6	0	37	0
26	DF	(Poland) Rafał Janicki	21+3	0	0	0	2	0	26	0
66	DF	(Austria) Emir Dilaver	31+1	3	1	0	4	0	37	3
77	DF	(Poland) Piotr Tomasik	3+3	0	0	0	0	0	6	0
Midfielders
6	MF	(Poland) Łukasz Trałka	33+1	6	0	0	5	1	39	7
7	MF	(Poland) Maciej Gajos	32+1	4	1	0	4+1	0	39	4
10	MF	(Switzerland) Darko Jevtić	19+5	5	0	0	3+1	3	28	8
15	MF	(Poland) Jakub Moder	0+1	0	0	0	0	0	1	0
16	MF	(Croatia) Mario Šitum	22+2	2	0	0	5	2	29	4
17	MF	(Poland) Maciej Makuszewski	15+6	5	1	0	5+1	0	28	5
18	MF	(Romania) Mihai Răduț	12+10	0	0+1	0	0+3	0	26	0
21	MF	(Poland) Jakub Serafin	0	0	0	0	0	0	0	0
23	MF	(Sweden) Nicklas Bärkroth	6+13	0	0+1	0	1+3	0	24	0
29	MF	(Poland) Kamil Jóźwiak	10+10	3	1	0	0+1	1	22	4
34	MF	(Poland) Tymoteusz Klupś	3+4	0	0	0	0	0	7	0
86	MF	(Poland) Radosław Majewski	25+4	2	1	0	5	2	35	4
Forwards
11	FW	(Ukraine) Oleksiy Khoblenko	1+10	2	0	0	0	0	11	2
14	FW	(Bosnia and Herzegovina) Elvir Koljić	1+4	0	0	0	0	0	5	0
32	FW	(Denmark) Christian Gytkjær	29+8	19	1	0	4	2	42	21
Players who appeared for Lech and left the club during the season:
3	DF	(Denmark) Lasse Nielsen	13	0	1	0	4	0	18	0
5	MF	(Ghana) Abdul Aziz Tetteh	7+4	0	1	0	4	0	16	0
11	FW	(Poland) Marcin Robak	0	0	0	0	0+1	0	1	0
14	FW	(Denmark) Nicki Bille Nielsen	6+8	1	0+1	0	2+3	2	20	3
92	FW	(Latvia) Deniss Rakels	3+8	0	0	0	0+3	0	14	0

=== Goalscorers ===
Place	Position	Number	Nation	Name	Ekstraklasa	Polish Cup	UEL	Total
1	FW	32	(Denmark)	Christian Gytkjær	19	0	2	21
2	MF	10	(Switzerland)	Darko Jevtić	5	0	3	8
3	MF	6	(Poland)	Łukasz Trałka	6	0	1	7
4	MF	17	(Poland)	Maciej Makuszewski	5	0	0	5
5	MF	7	(Poland)	Maciej Gajos	4	0	0	4
5	MF	16	(Croatia)	Mario Šitum	2	0	2	4
5	MF	29	(Poland)	Kamil Jóźwiak	3	0	1	4
5	MF	86	(Poland)	Radosław Majewski	2	0	2	4
9	FW	14	(Denmark)	Nicki Bille Nielsen	1	0	2	3
9	DF	66	(Austria)	Emir Dilaver	3	0	0	3
11	FW	11	(Ukraine)	Oleksiy Khoblenko	2	0	0	2
Own goal					1	0	0	1
TOTALS					53	0	13	66

=== Clean sheets ===
Place	Number	Nation	Name	Ekstraklasa	Polish Cup	UEL	Total
1	30	(Slovakia)	Matúš Putnocký	9	–	3	12
2	1	(Bosnia and Herzegovina)	Jasmin Burić	5	–	1	6
3	31	(Poland)	Bartosz Mrozek	–	–	–	–
3	33	(Poland)	Miłosz Mleczko	–	–	–	–
3	36	(Poland)	Bartosz Przybysz	–	–	–	–
TOTALS				14	0	4	18

=== Disciplinary record ===
Number	Position	Nation	Name	Ekstraklasa			Polish Cup			UEL			Total		
Number	Position	Nation	Name	Booked	(yellow card) (yellow-red card)	Sent off (straight red)	Booked	(yellow card) (yellow-red card)	Sent off (straight red)	Booked	(yellow card) (yellow-red card)	Sent off (straight red)	Booked	(yellow card) (yellow-red card)	Sent off (straight red)
1	GK	(Bosnia and Herzegovina)	Jasmin Burić	1	0	0	0	0	0	1	0	0	2	0	0
2	DF	(Poland)	Robert Gumny	5	0	0	–			1	0	0	6	0	0
4	DF	(Norway)	Thomas Rogne	–									0	0	0
6	MF	(Poland)	Łukasz Trałka	7	0	0	–			1	0	0	8	0	0
7	MF	(Poland)	Maciej Gajos	3	0	1	1	0	0	0	0	0	4	0	1
10	MF	(Switzerland)	Darko Jevtić	5	0	0	–			0	0	0	5	0	0
11	FW	(Ukraine)	Oleksiy Khoblenko	0	0	0	–						0	0	0
13	DF	(Montenegro)	Nikola Vujadinović	3	0	0	1	0	0	1	0	0	5	0	0
14	FW	(Bosnia and Herzegovina)	Elvir Koljić	0	0	0	–						0	0	0
15	MF	(Poland)	Jakub Moder	0	0	0	–						0	0	0
16	MF	(Croatia)	Mario Šitum	5	0	0	–			2	0	0	7	0	0
17	MF	(Poland)	Maciej Makuszewski	6	0	0	0	0	0	0	0	0	6	0	0
18	MF	(Romania)	Mihai Răduț	3	1	0	0	0	0	0	0	0	3	1	0
19	DF	(Argentina)	Vernon De Marco	0	0	0	–						0	0	0
21	MF	(Poland)	Jakub Serafin	–									0	0	0
22	DF	(Ukraine)	Volodymyr Kostevych	2	0	0	0	0	0	1	0	0	3	0	0
23	MF	(Sweden)	Nicklas Bärkroth	0	0	0	0	0	0	0	0	0	0	0	0
26	DF	(Poland)	Rafał Janicki	3	1	0	–			0	0	0	3	1	0
29	MF	(Poland)	Kamil Jóźwiak	1	0	0	0	0	0	0	0	0	1	0	0
30	GK	(Slovakia)	Matúš Putnocký	1	0	0	–			0	0	0	1	0	0
31	GK	(Poland)	Bartosz Mrozek	–									0	0	0
32	FW	(Denmark)	Christian Gytkjær	1	0	0	0	0	0	0	0	0	1	0	0
34	MF	(Poland)	Tymoteusz Klupś	1	0	0	–						1	0	0
36	GK	(Poland)	Bartosz Przybysz	–									0	0	0
66	DF	(Austria)	Emir Dilaver	8	0	0	0	0	0	0	0	0	8	0	0
77	DF	(Poland)	Piotr Tomasik	0	0	0	–						0	0	0
86	MF	(Poland)	Radosław Majewski	5	0	0	0	0	0	1	0	0	6	0	0
Players who appeared for Lech and left the club during the season:
3	DF	(Denmark)	Lasse Nielsen	4	0	0	0	0	0	0	0	0	4	0	0
5	MF	(Ghana)	Abdul Aziz Tetteh	1	0	1	1	0	0	1	0	0	3	0	1
11	FW	(Poland)	Marcin Robak	–						0	0	0	0	0	0
14	FW	(Denmark)	Nicki Bille Nielsen	2	0	0	0	0	0	2	0	0	4	0	0
92	FW	(Latvia)	Deniss Rakels	2	0	0	–			0	0	0	2	0	0
TOTALS				68	2	2	3	0	0	11	0	0	82	2	2
