= 2019–20 Lech Poznań season =

Lech Poznań
2019–20 season
- Chairman: Karol Klimczak
- Manager: Dariusz Żuraw
- Stadium: Stadion Miejski
- Ekstraklasa: 2nd
- Polish Cup: Semi-finals
- Top goalscorer: League: Christian Gytkjær (24 goals); All: Christian Gytkjær (27 goals)
- Highest home attendance: Ekstraklasa: 32,307 vs. Śląsk (9 August 2019)
- Lowest home attendance: Ekstraklasa: 5,113 vs. Pogoń (24 June 2020)
- Average home league attendance: Before COVID-19 pandemic: 14,941; Season average attendance: 13,834
- Biggest win: Lech 4–0 Wisła P. (26 July 2019); Lech 4–0 Wisła K. (5 October 2019); Resovia 0–4 Lech (29 October 2019); Lech 4–0 Pogoń (9 June 2020); Lech 4–0 Jagiellonia (19 July 2020)
- Biggest defeat: Lech 1–3 Śląsk (9 August 2019)
Home colours	Away colours	Third colours
- All statistics correct as of 19 July 2020.

Lech Poznań is a Polish football club based in Poznań. This was their 97th season overall. They competed in Ekstraklasa, the highest ranking league in Poland.

== Current squad ==
As of 1 March 2020.

Note: Flags indicate national team as defined under FIFA eligibility rules; some limited exceptions apply. Players may hold more than one non-FIFA nationality.

No.	Pos.	Nation	Player
1	GK	NED	Mickey van der Hart (Vice-captain)
2	DF	POL	Robert Gumny
4	DF	NOR	Thomas Rogne (Captain)
5	DF	SRB	Đorđe Crnomarković
6	MF	CRO	Karlo Muhar
7	MF	POL	Kamil Jóźwiak
8	FW	POL	Paweł Tomczyk
9	FW	DEN	Christian Gytkjær
11	FW	RUS	Timur Zhamaletdinov (on loan from (Russia) CSKA Moscow)
13	DF	POL	Tomasz Dejewski
14	MF	ESP	Dani Ramírez
15	MF	POL	Jakub Moder
16	MF	POL	Juliusz Letniowski
18	MF	POL	Eryk Kryg
19	MF	POL	Tomasz Cywka

No.	Pos.	Nation	Player
20	MF	POL	Mateusz Skrzypczak
21	MF	POL	Michał Skóraś
22	DF	UKR	Volodymyr Kostevych
23	FW	POL	Filip Szymczak
25	MF	POR	Pedro Tiba
27	DF	POL	Tymoteusz Puchacz
31	GK	POL	Krzysztof Bąkowski
33	GK	POL	Karol Szymański
36	MF	POL	Filip Marchwiński
37	DF	SVK	Ľubomír Šatka
38	MF	POL	Jakub Kamiński
40	DF	POL	Jakub Niewiadomski
91	DF	UKR	Bohdan Butko (on loan from (Ukraine) Shakhtar Donetsk)
99	GK	POL	Miłosz Mleczko

=== Out on loan ===
Note: Flags indicate national team as defined under FIFA eligibility rules; some limited exceptions apply. Players may hold more than one non-FIFA nationality.

No.	Pos.	Nation	Player
24	MF	POR	João Amaral (at (Portugal) F.C. Paços de Ferreira until end of 2019–20 season)
34	MF	POL	Tymoteusz Klupś (at Piast Gliwice until end of 2019–20 season)

No.	Pos.	Nation	Player
—	GK	POL	Bartosz Mrozek (at GKS Katowice until end of 2019–20 season)
—	DF	POL	Wiktor Pleśnierowicz (at (Italy) A.S. Roma Youth Sector until end of 2019–20 season)

== Transfer ==
=== Summer transfer window ===
==== In ====
No.	Pos.	Nat.	Name	Age	EU	Moving from	Type	Transfer window	Ends	Transfer fee	Source
5	DF	(Serbia)	Đorđe Crnomarković	25	EU	(Serbia) Radnički Niš	Transfer	Summer	2022	€500,000	
13	DF	(Poland)	Tomasz Dejewski	24	EU	Warta Poznań	Transfer	Summer	2021	Free	
1	GK	(Netherlands)	Mickey van der Hart	24	EU	(Netherlands) PEC Zwolle	Transfer	Summer	2022	Free	
38	MF	(Poland)	Jakub Kamiński	16	EU		Transfer	Summer	2021	Youth system	
99	GK	(Poland)	Miłosz Mleczko	20	EU	Puszcza Niepołomice	Loan return	Summer	2020	Free	
15	MF	(Poland)	Jakub Moder	20	EU	Odra Opole	Loan return	Summer	2020	Free	
	GK	(Poland)	Bartosz Mrozek	19	EU	Elana Toruń	Loan return	Summer	Undisclosed	Free	
6	MF	(Croatia)	Karlo Muhar	23	EU	(Croatia) Inter Zaprešić	Transfer	Summer	2023	€400,000	
27	DF	(Poland)	Tymoteusz Puchacz	20	EU	GKS Katowice	Loan return	Summer	2021	Free	
37	DF	(Slovakia)	Ľubomír Šatka	23	EU	(Slovakia) DAC Dunajská Streda	Transfer	Summer	2023	€750,000	
29	MF	(Poland)	Michał Skóraś	19	EU	Bruk-Bet Termalica Nieciecza	Loan return	Summer	2023	Free	
14	FW	(Poland)	Hubert Sobol	18	EU	Warta Poznań	Loan return	Summer	2021	Free	
23	FW	(Poland)	Filip Szymczak	17	EU		Transfer	Summer	Undisclosed	Youth system	
8	FW	(Poland)	Paweł Tomczyk	21	EU	Piast Gliwice	Loan return	Summer	2020	Free	

Total spending: ▼€1,650,000

==== Out ====
No.	Pos.	Nat.	Name	Age	EU	Moving to	Type	Transfer window	Transfer fee	Source
1	GK	(Poland) (Bosnia and Herzegovina)	Jasmin Burić	32	EU	(Israel) Hapoel Haifa	End of contract	Summer	Free	
3	DF	(Spain) (Argentina)	Vernon De Marco	26	EU	(Slovakia) Slovan Bratislava	End of loan	Summer	Free	
7	MF	(Poland)	Maciej Gajos	28	EU	Lechia Gdańsk	End of contract	Summer	Free	
5	DF	(Greece)	Dimitrios Goutas	25	EU	(Greece) Olympiacos	End of loan	Summer	Free	
26	DF	(Poland)	Rafał Janicki	26	EU	Lechia Gdańsk	End of loan	Summer	Free	
	GK	(Poland)	Bartosz Mrozek	19	EU	GKS Katowice	Loan	Summer	Free	
35	DF	(Poland)	Wiktor Pleśnierowicz	18	EU	(Italy) A.S. Roma Youth Sector	Loan	Summer	Free	
30	GK	(Slovakia)	Matúš Putnocký	34	EU	Śląsk Wrocław	End of contract	Summer	Free	
18	MF	(Romania)	Mihai Răduț	29	EU	(Romania) Astra Giurgiu	Mutual consent	Summer	Free	
29	MF	(Poland)	Michał Skóraś	19	EU	Raków Częstochowa	Loan	Summer	Free	
14	FW	(Poland)	Hubert Sobol	18	EU	Odra Opole	Loan	Summer	Free	
77	DF	(Poland)	Piotr Tomasik	31	EU	Wisła Płock	Mutual consent	Summer	Free	
6	MF	(Poland)	Łukasz Trałka	35	EU	Warta Poznań	End of contract	Summer	Free	
13	DF	(Bulgaria) (Montenegro)	Nikola Vujadinović	32	EU		End of contract	Summer	Free	
37	DF	(Poland)	Marcin Wasielewski	24	EU	Bruk-Bet Termalica Nieciecza	End of contract	Summer	Free	

Total income: €0

Total expenditure: ▼€1,650,000

=== Winter transfer window ===
==== In ====
No.	Pos.	Nat.	Name	Age	EU	Moving from	Type	Transfer window	Ends	Transfer fee	Source
91	DF	(Ukraine)	Bohdan Butko	29	Non-EU	(Ukraine) Shakhtar Donetsk	Loan	Winter	2020	Free	
18	MF	(Poland)	Eryk Kryg	20	EU		Transfer	Winter	2023	Youth system	
	FW	(Poland)	Dawid Kurminowski	20	EU	(Slovakia) Žilina	Loan return	Winter	2021	Free	
40	DF	(Poland)	Jakub Niewiadomski	17	EU		Transfer	Winter	2022	Youth system	
28	DF	(Poland)	Maciej Orłowski	25	EU	Górnik Łęczna	Loan return	Winter	2020	Free	
14	MF	(Spain)	Dani Ramírez	27	EU	ŁKS Łódź	Transfer	Winter	2023	€500,000	
21	MF	(Poland)	Michał Skóraś	19	EU	Raków Częstochowa	Loan return	Winter	2023	Free	
14	FW	(Poland)	Hubert Sobol	19	EU	Odra Opole	Loan return	Winter	2021	Free	

Total spending: ▼€500,000

==== Out ====
No.	Pos.	Nat.	Name	Age	EU	Moving to	Type	Transfer window	Transfer fee	Source
24	MF	(Portugal)	João Amaral	28	EU	(Portugal) Paços de Ferreira	Loan	Winter	Free	
10	MF	(Switzerland) (Serbia)	Darko Jevtić	26	EU	(Russia) Rubin Kazan	Transfer	Winter	€500,000	
34	MF	(Poland)	Tymoteusz Klupś	19	EU	Piast Gliwice	Loan	Winter	Free	
	FW	(Poland)	Dawid Kurminowski	20	EU	(Slovakia) Žilina	Transfer	Winter	€250,000	
17	MF	(Poland)	Maciej Makuszewski	30	EU	Jagiellonia Białystok	Transfer	Winter	Free	
28	DF	(Poland)	Maciej Orłowski	26	EU	Górnik Łęczna	Transfer	Winter	Undisclosed	
14	FW	(Poland)	Hubert Sobol	19	EU	Lech II Poznań	Loan	Winter	Free	

Total income: ▲€750,000

Total expenditure: ▲€250,000

== Friendlies ==
Win Draw Loss

22 June 2019 Club friendly	Lech Poznań	3–0	Widzew Łódź	Opalenica
17:00 CEST (UTC+02:00)	Tiba 30'; Skrzypczak 53'; Jevtić 79'	Official website 90minut		Stadium: Stadion Miejski; Referee: Szymon Lizak (Poznań)

26 June 2019 Club friendly	Lech Poznań	1–0	(Denmark) Brøndby IF	Opalenica
19:00 CEST (UTC+02:00)	Puchacz 10'	Official website 90minut		Stadium: Stadion Miejski

27 June 2019 Club friendly	Lech Poznań	1–3	(Cyprus) AEK Larnaca	Wronki
18:00 CEST (UTC+02:00)	Taulemesse 90' (o.g.)	Official website 90minut	Trichkovski 4', 11' (pen.); Taulemesse 86'	Stadium: Stadion Amiki

6 July 2019 Club friendly	Lech Poznań	2–1	(Denmark) Midtjylland	Poznań
17:00 CEST (UTC+02:00)	Kostevych 34'; Jevtić 56' (pen.)	Official website 90minut	Paulinho 53'	Stadium: Stadion Miejski; Attendance: 999; Referee: Piotr Idzik (Poznań)

9 July 2019 Club friendly	Lech Poznań	2–0	(Netherlands) Vitesse	Opalenica
17:00 CEST (UTC+02:00)	Marchwiński 31'; Crnomarković 38'	Official website 90minut		Stadium: Stadion Miejski

12 July 2019 Club friendly	Lech Poznań	3–1	GKS Tychy	Opalenica
10:30 CEST (UTC+02:00)	Zhamaletdinov 9', 17', 42'	Official website 90minut	Scalet 80'	Stadium: Stadion Miejski; Attendance: 0

12 July 2019 Club friendly	Lech Poznań	4–1	(Latvia) Spartaks Jūrmala	Opalenica
17:00 CEST (UTC+02:00)	Tomczyk 15'; Puchacz 39'; Cywka 57'; Gytkjær 74'	Official website 90minut	Nwaorisa 24'	Stadium: Stadion Miejski; Attendance: 0

7 September 2019 Club friendly	KSZO Ostrowiec Świętokrzyski	0–1	Lech Poznań	Ostrowiec Świętokrzyski
17:00 CEST (UTC+02:00)		Official website 90minut	Amaral 43'	Stadium: Miejski Stadion Sportowy "KSZO"

22 January 2020 Club friendly	Lech Poznań	0–0	(Romania) Astra Giurgiu	Belek, Turkey
15:30 CET (UTC+01:00)		Official website 90minut		Stadium: Bellis Deluxe Hotel

25 January 2020 Club friendly	Shakhtar Donetsk (Ukraine)	1–0	Lech Poznań	Belek, Turkey
15:00 CET (UTC+01:00)	Kryvtsov 50'	Official website 90minut		Stadium: Regnum Carya Golf & Spa Resort

28 January 2020 Club friendly	Lech Poznań	Cancelled	(Serbia) Voždovac	Belek, Turkey
10:00 CET (UTC+01:00)

28 January 2020 Club friendly	Maribor (Slovenia)	0–3	Lech Poznań	Belek, Turkey
16:00 CET (UTC+01:00)		Official website 90minut	Tiba 43'; Šatka 49'; Gytkjær 55' (pen.)	Stadium: Susesi Football Centre

9 February 2020 Club friendly	Lech Poznań	2–1	Błękitni Stargard	Poznań
CET (UTC+01:00)	Ramírez 42' (pen.); Bartkowiak 88'	Official website 90minut	Bednarski 60'	Stadium: Stadion Miejski; Attendance: 0

22 February 2020 Club friendly	Warta Poznań	Cancelled	Lech Poznań	Grodzisk Wielkopolski
CET (UTC+01:00)				Stadium: Dyskobolia Stadium

== Competitions ==
Win Draw Loss

=== Overall ===
Competition	Started round	Current position / round	Final position / round	First match	Last match
Ekstraklasa	—	—	2nd	20 July 2019	19 July 2020
Polish Cup	Round of 64	—	Semi-finals	24 September 2019	8 July 2020

Updated to match played 19 July 2020
Source: Competitions

=== Overview ===
Competition	Record							
Competition	G	W	D	L	GF	GA	GD	Win %
Ekstraklasa	37	18	12	7	70	35	+35	48.65
Polish Cup	5	4	1	0	12	2	+10	80.00
Total	42	22	13	7	82	37	+45	52.38

Updated to match played 19 July 2020
Source: Competitions

=== Ekstraklasa ===
==== Regular season ====
===== League table =====
Pos	Team	Pld	W	D	L	GF	GA	GD	Pts	Qualification
2	Piast Gliwice	30	16	5	9	36	26	+10	53	Qualification for the Championship round
3	Śląsk Wrocław	30	13	10	7	42	33	+9	49 (Note: Head-to-head points: Śląsk Wrocław 4, Lech Poznań 1.)	Qualification for the Championship round
4	Lech Poznań	30	13	10	7	55	29	+26	49	Qualification for the Championship round
5	Cracovia	30	14	4	12	39	29	+10	46	Qualification for the Championship round
6	Pogoń Szczecin	30	12	9	9	29	31	−2	45	Qualification for the Championship round

Source: Ekstraklasa, 90minut
Rules for classification: 1) Points; 2) Head-to-head points; 3) Head-to-head goal difference; 4) Head-to-head goals scored; 5) Head-to-head away goals scored (only if two teams); 6) Goal difference; 7) Goals scored; 8) Fairplay ranking; 9) Draw. (Note: Head-to-head record is used only after all the matches between the teams in question have been played.)

===== Results summary =====
Overall								Home						Away					
Pld	W	D	L	GF	GA	GD	Pts	W	D	L	GF	GA	GD	W	D	L	GF	GA	GD
30	13	10	7	55	29	+26	49	8	3	4	31	11	+20	5	7	3	24	18	+6

Last updated: 15 June 2020.
Source: 90minut.pl

===== Results by round =====
Round	1	2	3	4	5	6	7	8	9	10	11	12	13	14	15	16	17	18	19	20	21	22	23	24	25	26	27	28	29	30
Ground	A	H	A	H	A	A	H	A	H	A	H	A	H	A	H	H	A	H	A	H	H	A	H	A	H	A	H	A	H	A
Result	D	W	W	L	D	W	L	L	D	W	W	L	L	D	D	W	W	W	D	D	W	L	W	D	W	D	L	D	W	W
Position	5	3	1	3	4	4	6	8	9	8	5	8	10	9	9	9	8	6	7	5	5	5	5	5	4	5	5	5	4	4

Updated to match(es) played on 15 June 2020. Source: 90minut.pl Ekstraklasa
A = Away; H = Home; W = Win; D = Draw; L = Loss

===== Matches =====
Win Draw Loss

20 July 2019 Match 1	Piast Gliwice	1–1	Lech Poznań	Gliwice
20:00 CEST (UTC+02:00)	Félix 6'	Ekstraklasa; 90minut	Tomczyk 82'	Stadium: Stadion Miejski; Attendance: 4,698; Referee: Tomasz Kwiatkowski (Warsaw)

26 July 2019 Match 2	Lech Poznań	4–0	Wisła Płock	Poznań
20:30 CEST (UTC+02:00)	Jevtić 13' (pen.); Gytkjær 72', 90+3'; Jóźwiak 90+1'	Ekstraklasa; 90minut		Stadium: Stadion Miejski; Attendance: 16,616; Referee: Jarosław Przybył (Kluczbork)

3 August 2019 Match 3	ŁKS Łódź	1–2	Lech Poznań	Łódź
20:00 CEST (UTC+02:00)	Ramírez 32'	Ekstraklasa; 90minut	Amaral 4'; Jevtić 34'	Stadium: Stadion ŁKS; Attendance: 5,452; Referee: Daniel Stefański (Bydgoszcz)

9 August 2019 Match 4	Lech Poznań	1–3	Śląsk Wrocław	Poznań
20:30 CEST (UTC+02:00)	Jevtić 14'	Ekstraklasa; 90minut	Pich 6' (pen.); Broź 16', 26'	Stadium: Stadion Miejski; Attendance: 32,307; Referee: Szymon Marciniak (Płock)

17 August 2019 Match 5	Arka Gdynia	0–0	Lech Poznań	Gdynia
17:30 CEST (UTC+02:00)		Ekstraklasa; 90minut		Stadium: Stadion GOSiR; Attendance: 10,098; Referee: Paweł Raczkowski (Warsaw)

24 August 2019 Match 6	Raków Częstochowa	2–3	Lech Poznań	Bełchatów
20:00 CEST (UTC+02:00)	Schwarz 51' (pen.), 74' (pen.)	Ekstraklasa; 90minut	Muhar 30'; Gytkjær 32', 84'	Stadium: GIEKSA Arena; Attendance: 4,018; Referee: Mariusz Złotek (Stalowa Wola)

1 September 2019 Match 7	Lech Poznań	1–2	Cracovia	Poznań
17:30 CEST (UTC+02:00)	Tomczyk 88'	Ekstraklasa; 90minut	Râpă 27'; van Amersfoort 68'	Stadium: Stadion Miejski; Attendance: 25,768; Referee: Bartosz Frankowski (Toruń)

14 September 2019 Match 8	Lechia Gdańsk	2–1	Lech Poznań	Gdańsk
17:30 CEST (UTC+02:00)	Peszko 23'; Nalepa 33'	Ekstraklasa; 90minut	Gytkjær 45'	Stadium: Stadion Energa Gdańsk; Attendance: 14,008; Referee: Tomasz Kwiatkowski (Warsaw)

20 September 2019 Match 9	Lech Poznań	1–1	Jagiellonia Białystok	Poznań
20:30 CEST (UTC+02:00)	Tomczyk 39' (pen.)	Ekstraklasa; 90minut	Klimala 22'	Stadium: Stadion Miejski; Attendance: 11,947; Referee: Tomasz Musiał (Kraków)

28 September 2019 Match 10	Górnik Zabrze	1–3	Lech Poznań	Zabrze
20:00 CEST (UTC+02:00)	Jiménez 39'	Ekstraklasa; 90minut	Jóźwiak 24'; Puchacz 43'; Gytkjær 90+4'	Stadium: Ernest Pohl Stadium; Attendance: 15,662; Referee: Jarosław Przybył (Kluczbork)

5 October 2019 Match 11	Lech Poznań	4–0	Wisła Kraków	Poznań
17:30 CEST (UTC+02:00)	Jevtić 40'; Gytkjær 76'; Jóźwiak 80'; Marchwiński 88'	Ekstraklasa; 90minut		Stadium: Stadion Miejski; Attendance: 15,089; Referee: Daniel Stefański (Bydgoszcz)

19 October 2019 Match 12	Legia Warsaw	2–1	Lech Poznań	Warsaw
17:30 CEST (UTC+02:00)	Novikovas 63'; Rosołek 76'	Ekstraklasa; 90minut	Jevtić 55'	Stadium: Polish Army Stadium; Attendance: 25,401; Referee: Tomasz Musiał (Kraków)

25 October 2019 Match 13	Lech Poznań	1–2	Zagłębie Lubin	Poznań
20:30 CEST (UTC+02:00)	Gytkjær 90+4'	Ekstraklasa; 90minut	Tosik 23'; Bohar 67'	Stadium: Stadion Miejski; Attendance: 12,417; Referee: Jarosław Przybył (Kluczbork)

2 November 2019 Match 14	Pogoń Szczecin	1–1	Lech Poznań	Szczecin
20:00 CET (UTC+01:00)	Spiridonović 21'	Ekstraklasa; 90minut	Rogne 82'	Stadium: Stadion Florian Krygier; Attendance: 3,697; Referee: Łukasz Szczech (Warsaw)

10 November 2019 Match 15	Lech Poznań	0–0	Korona Kielce	Poznań
15:00 CET (UTC+01:00)		Ekstraklasa; 90minut		Stadium: Stadion Miejski; Attendance: 22,179; Referee: Piotr Lasyk (Bytom)

22 November 2019 Match 16	Lech Poznań	3–0	Piast Gliwice	Poznań
20:30 CET (UTC+01:00)	Gytkjær 45+1' (pen.), 56'; Amaral 90+1'	Ekstraklasa; 90minut		Stadium: Stadion Miejski; Attendance: 8,241; Referee: Szymon Marciniak (Płock)

29 November 2019 Match 17	Wisła Płock	0–2	Lech Poznań	Płock
20:30 CET (UTC+01:00)		Ekstraklasa; 90minut	Puchacz 33'; Gytkjær 90+1'	Stadium: Kazimierz Górski Stadium; Attendance: 4,501; Referee: Mariusz Złotek (Stalowa Wola)

7 December 2019 Match 18	Lech Poznań	2–0	ŁKS Łódź	Poznań
17:30 CET (UTC+01:00)	Amaral 59'; Jóźwiak 90+3'	Ekstraklasa; 90minut		Stadium: Stadion Miejski; Attendance: 9,830; Referee: Daniel Stefański (Bydgoszcz)

14 December 2019 Match 19	Śląsk Wrocław	1–1	Lech Poznań	Wrocław
17:30 CET (UTC+01:00)	Cholewiak 26'	Ekstraklasa; 90minut	Jevtić 84'	Stadium: Stadion Miejski; Attendance: 0 Referee: Tomasz Musiał (Kraków)

19 December 2019 Match 20	Lech Poznań	1–1	Arka Gdynia	Poznań
20:30 CET (UTC+01:00)	Šatka 74'	Ekstraklasa; 90minut	Serrarens 45+1'	Stadium: Stadion Miejski; Attendance: 7,641; Referee: Krzysztof Jakubik (Siedlce)

8 February 2020 Match 21	Lech Poznań	3–0	Raków Częstochowa	Poznań
17:30 CET (UTC+01:00)	Gytkjær 68' (pen.); Puchacz 82'; Moder 88'	Ekstraklasa; 90minut		Stadium: Stadion Miejski; Attendance: 10,872; Referee: Paweł Raczkowski (Warsaw)

16 February 2020 Match 22	Cracovia	2–1	Lech Poznań	Kraków
17:30 CET (UTC+01:00)	Pestka 47'; Hanca 68' (pen.)	Ekstraklasa; 90minut	Jóźwiak 23'	Stadium: Marshal Józef Piłsudski Stadium; Attendance: 12,247; Referee: Bartosz Frankowski (Toruń)

23 February 2020 Match 23	Lech Poznań	2–0	Lechia Gdańsk	Poznań
17:30 CET (UTC+01:00)	Kuciak 82' (o.g.); Marchwiński 90'	Ekstraklasa; 90minut		Stadium: Stadion Miejski; Attendance: 12,693; Referee: Piotr Lasyk (Bytom)

28 February 2020 Match 24	Jagiellonia Białystok	1–1	Lech Poznań	Białystok
20:30 CET (UTC+01:00)	Țîru 41'	Ekstraklasa; 90minut	Moder 62'	Stadium: Stadion Miejski; Attendance: 6,886; Referee: Krzysztof Jakubik (Siedlce)

3 March 2020 Match 25	Lech Poznań	4–1	Górnik Zabrze	Poznań
18:00 CET (UTC+01:00)	Ramírez 3'; Jóźwiak 54'; Gytkjær 80', 86'	Ekstraklasa; 90minut	Krawczyk 35'	Stadium: Stadion Miejski; Attendance: 8,634; Referee: Mariusz Złotek (Stalowa Wola)

8 March 2020 Match 26	Wisła Kraków	1–1	Lech Poznań	Kraków
15:00 CET (UTC+01:00)	Savićević 6'	Ekstraklasa; 90minut	Gytkjær 40'	Stadium: Stadion Miejski; Attendance: 21,281; Referee: Szymon Marciniak (Płock)

On 10 March 2020, Marcin Animucki, the chairman of Ekstraklasa S.A., announced that due to appearance of a coronavirus pandemic in Poland, all Ekstraklasa matches will be played with closed stands until further notice. On 13 March 2020 Ekstraklasa S.A. announced that all Ekstraklasa matches scheduled to be played in March 2020 have been postponed. On 20 March 2020 they decided to cancel all Ekstraklasa games scheduled to 26 April 2020.

30 May 2020 Match 27	Lech Poznań	0–1	Legia Warsaw	Poznań
20:00 CEST (UTC+02:00)		Ekstraklasa; 90minut	Pekhart 17'	Stadium: Stadion Miejski; Attendance: 0 Referee: Tomasz Musiał (Kraków)
Note: Match originally scheduled on 14 March 2020, 20:00 CET (UTC+01:00) was postponed due to coronavirus pandemic in Poland.

6 June 2020 Match 28	Zagłębie Lubin	3–3	Lech Poznań	Lubin
17:30 CEST (UTC+02:00)	Starzyński 9' (pen.), 40' (pen.); Živec 26'	Ekstraklasa; 90minut	Gytkjær 21'; Kamiński 77'; Ramírez 88' (pen.)	Stadium: Stadion Zagłębia Lubin; Attendance: 0 Referee: Piotr Lasyk (Bytom)
Note: Match originally scheduled on 21 March 2020, 17:30 CET (UTC+01:00) was postponed due to coronavirus pandemic in Poland.

9 June 2020 Match 29	Lech Poznań	4–0	Pogoń Szczecin	Poznań
20:30 CEST (UTC+02:00)	Moder 22'; Gytkjær 31'; Ramírez 57'; Kamiński 62'	Ekstraklasa; 90minut		Stadium: Stadion Miejski; Attendance: 0 Referee: Łukasz Szczech (Warsaw)
Note: Match originally scheduled on 4 April 2020, 17:30 CEST (UTC+02:00) was postponed due to coronavirus pandemic in Poland.

14 June 2020 Match 30	Korona Kielce	0–3	Lech Poznań	Kielce
18:00 CEST (UTC+02:00)		Ekstraklasa; 90minut	Gytkjær 48', 65' (pen.), 68'	Stadium: Stadion Miejski; Attendance: 0 Referee: Tomasz Musiał (Kraków)
Note: Match originally scheduled on 11 April 2020 was postponed due to coronavirus pandemic in Poland.

==== Championship round ====
===== League table =====
Pos	Team	Pld	W	D	L	GF	GA	GD	Pts	Qualification
1	Legia Warsaw (C)	37	21	6	10	70	35	+35	69	Qualification for the Champions League first qualifying round
2	Lech Poznań	37	18	12	7	70	35	+35	66	Qualification for the Europa League first qualifying round
3	Piast Gliwice	37	18	7	12	41	32	+9	61	Qualification for the Europa League first qualifying round
4	Lechia Gdańsk	37	15	11	11	48	50	−2	56	
5	Śląsk Wrocław	37	14	12	11	51	46	+5	54 (Note: Points in regular season: Śląsk Wrocław - 49 pts, Pogoń Szczecin - 45 pts.)	

Source: Ekstraklasa, 90minut
Rules for classification: 1) Points; 2) Points in regular season; 3) Head-to-head points in regular season; 4) Head-to-head goal difference in regular season; 5) Head-to-head goals scored in regular season; 5) Head-to-head away goals scored in regular season (if only two teams); 7) Goal difference; 8) Goals scored; 9) Fairplay ranking; 10) Play-off (only if needed to decide champion, teams for relegation or teams for UEFA competitions).
(C) Champions

===== Results summary =====
Overall								Home						Away					
Pld	W	D	L	GF	GA	GD	Pts	W	D	L	GF	GA	GD	W	D	L	GF	GA	GD
7	5	2	0	15	6	+9	17	3	1	0	9	3	+6	2	1	0	6	3	+3

Last updated: 19 July 2020.
Source: 90minut.pl

===== Results by round =====
Round	1	2	3	4	5	6	7
Ground	A	H	A	H	H	A	H
Result	W	D	D	W	W	W	W
Position	3	3	3	3	3	2	2

Updated to match(es) played on 19 July 2020. Source: 90minut.pl
A = Away; H = Home; W = Win; D = Draw; L = Loss

===== Matches =====
Win Draw Loss

20 June 2020 Match 31	Piast Gliwice	0–2	Lech Poznań	Gliwice
17:30 CEST (UTC+02:00)		Ekstraklasa; 90minut	Moder 66'; Tiba 90+5'	Stadium: Stadion Miejski; Attendance: 1,193; Referee: Krzysztof Jakubik (Siedlce)
Note: Match originally scheduled on 17–20 April 2020 was postponed due to coronavirus pandemic in Poland. Due to coronavirus pandemic in Poland, starting with 31st round only 25% of seats can be utilized by spectators.

24 June 2020 Match 32	Lech Poznań	0–0	Pogoń Szczecin	Poznań
20:30 CEST (UTC+02:00)		Ekstraklasa; 90minut		Stadium: Stadion Miejski; Attendance: 5,113; Referee: Wojciech Myć (Lublin)
Note: Match originally scheduled on 24–27 April 2020 was postponed due to coronavirus pandemic in Poland. Due to coronavirus pandemic in Poland, starting with 31st round only 25% of seats can be utilized by spectators.

28 June 2020 Match 33	Śląsk Wrocław	2–2	Lech Poznań	Wrocław
17:30 CEST (UTC+02:00)	Puerto 77'; Łabojko 86'	Ekstraklasa; 90minut	Gytkjær 18'; Moder 83' (pen.)	Stadium: Stadion Miejski; Attendance: 5,781; Referee: Tomasz Kwiatkowski (Warsaw)
Note: Match originally scheduled on 1–3 May 2020 was postponed due to coronavirus pandemic in Poland. Due to coronavirus pandemic in Poland, starting with 31st round only 25% of seats can be utilized by spectators.

4 July 2020 Match 34	Lech Poznań	2–1	Legia Warsaw	Poznań
17:30 CEST (UTC+02:00)	Jóźwiak 24'; Kamiński 29'	Ekstraklasa; 90minut	Lewczuk 71'	Stadium: Stadion Miejski; Attendance: 8,167; Referee: Paweł Gil (Lublin)
Note: Match originally scheduled on 8–10 May 2020 was postponed due to coronavirus pandemic in Poland. Due to coronavirus pandemic in Poland, starting with 31st round only 25% of seats can be utilized by spectators.

12 July 2020 Match 35	Lech Poznań	3–2	Lechia Gdańsk	Poznań
17:30 CEST (UTC+02:00)	Ramírez 5'; Gumny 22'; Jóźwiak 45'	Ekstraklasa; 90minut	Haydary 43'; Gomes 47'	Stadium: Stadion Miejski; Attendance: 6,432; Referee: Krzysztof Jakubik (Siedlce)
Note: Match originally scheduled on 12–13 May 2020 was postponed due to coronavirus pandemic in Poland. Due to coronavirus pandemic in Poland, starting with 31st round only 25% of seats can be utilized by spectators.

15 July 2020 Match 36	Cracovia	1–2	Lech Poznań	Kraków
20:30 CEST (UTC+02:00)	Crnomarković 81' (o.g.)	Ekstraklasa; 90minut	Gytkjær 25'; Marchwiński 73'	Stadium: Marshal Józef Piłsudski Stadium; Attendance: 3,216; Referee: Jarosław Przybył (Kluczbork)
Note: Match originally scheduled on 16–17 May 2020 was postponed due to coronavirus pandemic in Poland. Due to coronavirus pandemic in Poland, starting with 31st round only 25% of seats can be utilized by spectators.

19 July 2020 Match 37	Lech Poznań	4–0	Jagiellonia Białystok	Poznań
17:30 CEST (UTC+02:00)	Tiba 6'; Gytkjær 13', 39'; Kamiński 31'	Ekstraklasa; 90minut		Stadium: Stadion Miejski; Attendance: 8,483; Referee: Paweł Raczkowski (Warsaw)
Note: Match originally scheduled on 22–23 May 2020 was postponed due to coronavirus pandemic in Poland. Due to coronavirus pandemic in Poland, starting with 31st round only 25% of seats can be utilized by spectators.

=== Polish Cup ===
24 September 2019 Round of 64	Chrobry Głogów	0–2	Lech Poznań	Głogów
17:30 CEST (UTC+02:00)		Łączy nas piłka 90minut	Gytkjær 75'; Skrzypczak 84'	Stadium: Stadion Chrobego; Attendance: 1,494; Referee: Zbigniew Dobrynin (Łódź)

29 October 2019 Round of 32	Resovia	0–4	Lech Poznań	Rzeszów
13:00 CET (UTC+01:00)		Łączy nas piłka 90minut	Gytkjær 38', 45'; Kostevych 47'; Marchwiński 54'	Stadium: Stadion Resovii; Attendance: 3,200; Referee: Wojciech Myć (Lublin)

4 December 2019 Round of 16	Stal Stalowa Wola	0–2	Lech Poznań	Boguchwała
12:15 CET (UTC+01:00)		Łączy nas piłka 90minut	Puchacz 2'; Dejewski 69'	Stadium: Izo Arena; Referee: Sebastian Jarzębak (Bytom)

27 May 2020 Quarter-final	Stal Mielec	1–3	Lech Poznań	Mielec
20:10 CEST (UTC+02:00)	Nowak 45'	Łączy nas piłka 90minut	Ramírez 5'; Zhamaletdinov 34'; Jóźwiak 82'	Stadium: Stadion Stali Mielec; Attendance: 0 Referee: Paweł Gil (Lublin)
Note: Match originally scheduled on 17 March 2020, 18:00 CET (UTC+01:00) was cancelled on 13 March 2020 by Polish Football Association due to coronavirus pandemic in Poland.

8 July 2020 Semi-final	Lech Poznań	1–1 (a.e.t.) (3–4 p)	Lechia Gdańsk	Poznań
20:00 CEST (UTC+02:00)	Ramírez 65'	Łączy nas piłka 90minut	Paixão 62'	Stadium: Stadion Miejski; Attendance: 7,192; Referee: Tomasz Musiał (Kraków)
	Penalties
	Gytkjær (penalty scored); Moder (penalty scored); Šatka (penalty scored); Marchwiński (penalty missed); Ramírez (penalty missed); Jóźwiak (penalty missed)		(penalty scored) Kubicki; (penalty missed) Pietrzak; (penalty scored) Zwoliński; (penalty missed) Kryeziu; (penalty scored) Paixão; (penalty scored) Gajos
Note: Due to coronavirus pandemic in Poland, starting with semi-final matches only 25% of seats can be utilized by spectators.

== Squad statistics ==
=== Appearances and goals ===
As of 19 July 2020.

No.	Pos	Player	Ekstraklasa		Polish Cup		Total	
No.	Pos	Player	Apps	Goals	Apps	Goals	Apps	Goals
Goalkeepers
1	GK	(Netherlands) Mickey van der Hart	34	0	5	0	39	0
31	GK	(Poland) Krzysztof Bąkowski	0	0	0	0	0	0
33	GK	(Poland) Karol Szymański	2	0	0	0	2	0
99	GK	(Poland) Miłosz Mleczko	1	0	0	0	1	0
Defenders
2	DF	(Poland) Robert Gumny	19+2	1	1+1	0	23	1
4	DF	(Norway) Thomas Rogne	19+1	1	1	0	21	1
5	DF	(Serbia) Đorđe Crnomarković	23+3	0	4	0	30	0
13	DF	(Poland) Tomasz Dejewski	5+3	0	2	1	10	1
22	DF	(Ukraine) Volodymyr Kostevych	26+1	0	3+1	1	31	1
27	DF	(Poland) Tymoteusz Puchacz	30+5	3	3+2	1	40	4
37	DF	(Slovakia) Ľubomír Šatka	31	1	3+1	0	35	1
40	DF	(Poland) Jakub Niewiadomski	0	0	0	0	0	0
91	DF	(Ukraine) Bohdan Butko	10	0	2	0	12	0
Midfielders
6	MF	(Croatia) Karlo Muhar	27+2	1	2+1	0	32	1
7	MF	(Poland) Kamil Jóźwiak	33+2	8	4	1	39	9
14	MF	(Spain) Dani Ramírez	16	4	2	2	18	6
15	MF	(Poland) Jakub Moder	15+11	5	3+1	0	30	5
16	MF	(Poland) Juliusz Letniowski	0+5	0	0+1	0	6	0
18	MF	(Poland) Eryk Kryg	0	0	0	0	0	0
19	MF	(Poland) Tomasz Cywka	0	0	1	0	1	0
20	MF	(Poland) Mateusz Skrzypczak	1+1	0	1+1	1	4	1
21	MF	(Poland) Michał Skóraś	0+5	0	0	0	5	0
25	MF	(Portugal) Pedro Tiba	31+1	2	4	0	36	2
36	MF	(Poland) Filip Marchwiński	3+17	3	2+1	1	23	4
38	MF	(Poland) Jakub Kamiński	17+7	4	3+1	0	28	4
Forwards
8	FW	(Poland) Paweł Tomczyk	2+13	3	0+2	0	17	3
9	FW	(Denmark) Christian Gytkjær	31+3	24	4	3	38	27
11	FW	(Russia) Timur Zhamaletdinov	3+8	0	1	1	12	1
23	FW	(Poland) Filip Szymczak	0+4	0	0+1	0	5	0
Players who appeared for Lech and left the club during the season:
10	MF	(Switzerland) Darko Jevtić	16+3	6	1	0	20	6
17	MF	(Poland) Maciej Makuszewski	1+4	0	2	0	7	0
24	MF	(Portugal) João Amaral	10+5	3	1+1	0	17	3
34	MF	(Poland) Tymoteusz Klupś	1+2	0	0	0	3	0

=== Goalscorers ===
As of 19 July 2020.

Place	Number	Position	Nation	Name	Ekstraklasa	Polish Cup	Total
1	9	FW	(Denmark)	Christian Gytkjær	24	3	27
2	7	MF	(Poland)	Kamil Jóźwiak	8	1	9
3	10	MF	(Switzerland)	Darko Jevtić	6	0	6
3	14	MF	(Spain)	Dani Ramírez	4	2	6
5	15	MF	(Poland)	Jakub Moder	5	0	5
6	27	DF	(Poland)	Tymoteusz Puchacz	3	1	4
6	36	MF	(Poland)	Filip Marchwiński	3	1	4
6	38	MF	(Poland)	Jakub Kamiński	4	0	4
9	8	FW	(Poland)	Paweł Tomczyk	3	0	3
9	24	MF	(Portugal)	João Amaral	3	0	3
11	26	MF	(Portugal)	Pedro Tiba	2	0	2
12	2	DF	(Poland)	Robert Gumny	1	0	1
12	4	DF	(Norway)	Thomas Rogne	1	0	1
12	6	MF	(Croatia)	Karlo Muhar	1	0	1
12	11	FW	(Russia)	Timur Zhamaletdinov	0	1	1
12	13	DF	(Poland)	Tomasz Dejewski	0	1	1
12	20	MF	(Poland)	Mateusz Skrzypczak	0	1	1
12	22	DF	(Ukraine)	Volodymyr Kostevych	0	1	1
12	37	DF	(Slovakia)	Ľubomír Šatka	1	0	1
12	Own goal				1	0	1
TOTALS					70	12	82

=== Clean sheets ===
As of 19 July 2020.

Place	Number	Nation	Name	Ekstraklasa	Polish Cup	Total
1	1	(Netherlands)	Mickey van der Hart	13	3	16
2	33	(Poland)	Karol Szymański	1	–	1
3	99	(Poland)	Miłosz Mleczko	0	–	0
–	31	(Poland)	Krzysztof Bąkowski	–	–	–
TOTALS				14	3	17

=== Disciplinary record ===
As of 19 July 2020.

Number	Position	Nation	Name	Ekstraklasa			Polish Cup			Total		
Number	Position	Nation	Name	Booked	(yellow card) (yellow-red card)	Sent off (straight red)	Booked	(yellow card) (yellow-red card)	Sent off (straight red)	Booked	(yellow card) (yellow-red card)	Sent off (straight red)
1	GK	(Netherlands)	Mickey van der Hart	1	0	0	0	0	0	1	0	0
2	DF	(Poland)	Robert Gumny	5	0	0	1	0	0	6	0	0
4	DF	(Norway)	Thomas Rogne	6	1	0	0	0	0	6	1	0
5	DF	(Serbia)	Đorđe Crnomarković	9	2	0	1	0	0	10	2	0
6	MF	(Croatia)	Karlo Muhar	6	0	0	1	0	0	7	0	0
7	MF	(Poland)	Kamil Jóźwiak	5	0	0	0	0	0	5	0	0
8	FW	(Poland)	Paweł Tomczyk	0	0	0	0	0	0	0	0	0
9	FW	(Denmark)	Christian Gytkjær	4	0	0	0	0	0	4	0	0
11	FW	(Russia)	Timur Zhamaletdinov	0	0	0	0	0	0	0	0	0
13	DF	(Poland)	Tomasz Dejewski	0	0	0	0	0	0	0	0	0
14	MF	(Spain)	Dani Ramírez	3	0	0	0	0	0	3	0	0
15	MF	(Poland)	Jakub Moder	5	0	0	0	0	0	5	0	0
16	MF	(Poland)	Juliusz Letniowski	0	0	0	0	0	0	0	0	0
18	MF	(Poland)	Eryk Kryg	–						0	0	0
19	MF	(Poland)	Tomasz Cywka	–			0	0	0	0	0	0
20	MF	(Poland)	Mateusz Skrzypczak	1	0	0	0	0	0	1	0	0
21	MF	(Poland)	Michał Skóraś	0	0	0	–			0	0	0
22	DF	(Ukraine)	Volodymyr Kostevych	3	0	0	0	0	0	3	0	0
23	FW	(Poland)	Filip Szymczak	0	0	0	0	0	0	0	0	0
25	MF	(Portugal)	Pedro Tiba	6	0	0	0	0	0	6	0	0
27	DF	(Poland)	Tymoteusz Puchacz	7	0	0	1	0	0	8	0	0
31	GK	(Poland)	Krzysztof Bąkowski	–						0	0	0
33	GK	(Poland)	Karol Szymański	0	0	0	–			0	0	0
36	MF	(Poland)	Filip Marchwiński	2	0	0	1	0	0	3	0	0
37	DF	(Slovakia)	Ľubomír Šatka	2	0	0	0	0	0	2	0	0
38	MF	(Poland)	Jakub Kamiński	0	0	0	0	0	0	0	0	0
40	DF	(Poland)	Jakub Niewiadomski	–						0	0	0
91	DF	(Ukraine)	Bohdan Butko	1	0	0	0	0	0	1	0	0
99	GK	(Poland)	Miłosz Mleczko	1	0	0	–			1	0	0
Players who appeared for Lech and left the club during the season:
10	MF	(Switzerland)	Darko Jevtić	1	0	0	1	0	0	2	0	0
17	MF	(Poland)	Maciej Makuszewski	2	1	0	0	0	0	2	1	0
24	MF	(Portugal)	João Amaral	2	0	0	0	0	0	2	0	0
34	MF	(Poland)	Tymoteusz Klupś	0	0	0	–			0	0	0
TOTALS				72	4	0	6	0	0	78	4	0
