= Kostevych =

Kostevych is a surname (Belarusian: Касцевіч, Polish: Kostewicz, Ukrainian: Костевич). People with this name include:

- Olena Dmytrivna Kostevych (Ukrainian: Олена Дмитрівна Костевич, born 1985), Ukrainian pistol shooter
- Volodymyr Yevhenovych Kostevych (Ukrainian: Володимир Євгенович Костевич, born 1992), Ukrainian footballer
