= Jakub Moder =

Polish footballer (born 1999)

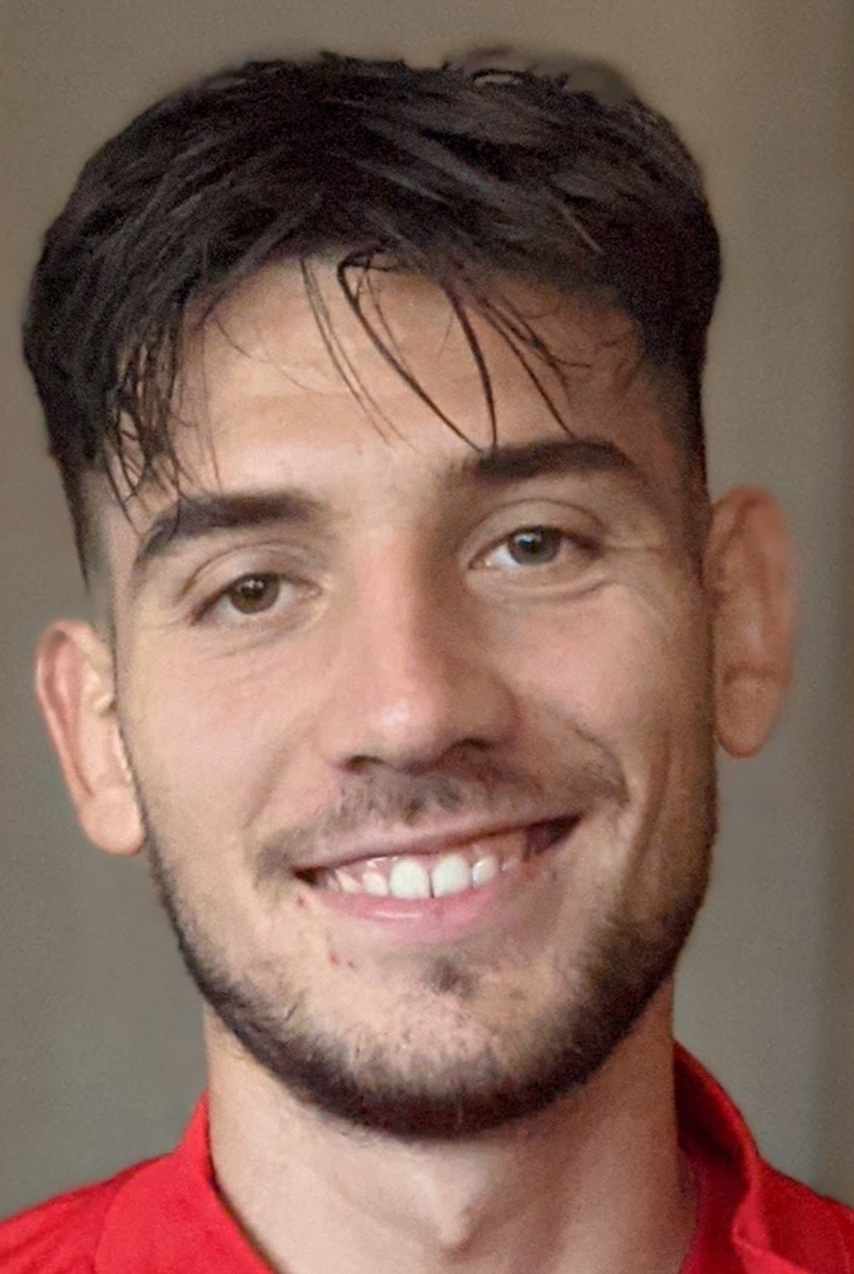
- Moder in 2021

Personal information
- Full name: Jakub Piotr Moder
- Date of birth: 7 April 1999 (age 27)
- Place of birth: Szczecinek, Poland
- Height: 1.88 m (6 ft 2 in)
- Position: Midfielder

Team information
- Current team: Feyenoord
- Number: 7

Youth career
- 2010–2011: Fortuna Wieleń
- 2011–2014: Warta Poznań
- 2014–2016: Lech Poznań

Senior career*
| Years | Team | Apps | (Gls) |
| 2016–2020 | Lech Poznań II | 61 | (7) |
| 2017–2020 | Lech Poznań | 32 | (7) |
| 2018–2019 | → Odra Opole (loan) | 31 | (4) |
| 2020–2025 | Brighton & Hove Albion | 61 | (0) |
| 2020 | → Lech Poznań (loan) | 9 | (2) |
| 2025– | Feyenoord | 25 | (4) |

International career^{‡}
| 2015–2016 | Poland U17 | 11 | (0) |
| 2016–2017 | Poland U18 | 7 | (0) |
| 2017–2018 | Poland U19 | 10 | (1) |
| 2018–2019 | Poland U20 | 8 | (2) |
| 2020– | Poland | 36 | (2) |
- * Club domestic league appearances and goals as of 16:30, 25 October 2026 (UTC) ‡ National team caps and goals as of 21:53, 26 March 2026 (UTC)

Jakub Piotr Moder (Polish pronunciation: [ˈjakup 'pʲɔtr ˈmɔdɛr]; born 7 April 1999) is a Polish professional footballer who plays as a midfielder for Eredivisie club Feyenoord and the Poland national team.

== Club career ==
=== Early career ===
Moder was born in Szczecinek. He began his steps towards becoming a footballer at Fortuna Wieleń, and in 2011, he joined Warta Poznań as an academy player.

=== Lech Poznań ===
In 2014, Moder joined Lech Poznań's academy, and was promoted to the reserve team in 2016. On 2 April 2018, he made his first team debut for Lech Poznań in a 1–3 win away against Wisła Kraków, coming on as a substitute.

==== Odra Opole (loan) ====
On 18 June 2018, Moder was loaned to I liga side Odra Opole.

==== 2019–20 season ====
After returning from his loan spell at Odra Opole, Moder extended his contract with Lech Poznań until 2023, and quickly became a regular starter under Dariusz Żuraw. He got his first assist for Lech Poznań in a 3–1 away win against Górnik Zabrze, and in February 2020, he scored his first goal for 'Kolejorz' in a 3–0 home win against Raków Częstochowa. On 20 June 2020, Moder scored a free-kick from outside the box to help Lech defeat Piast Gliwice in a 2–0 away win. He was voted as the Best Youth Player of the month in Ekstraklasa for June 2020.

==== 2020–21 season ====
Moder was a key in Lech Poznań's qualification for the 2020–21 UEFA Europa League, providing an assist in a 3–0 home win against Valmiera.

=== Brighton & Hove Albion ===
On 6 October 2020, he signed for Premier League side Brighton & Hove Albion for a reported transfer fee of over £9 million.

==== Lech Poznań (loan) ====
Moder was immediately loaned back to former club Lech Poznań, initially until the end of the season (this depended on Lech Poznań's progress in the UEFA Europa League). Despite Lech Poznań's poor start to the 2020–21 Ekstraklasa season, Moder helped the team by scoring 4 goals and providing 2 assists. On 22 October 2020 he made his UEFA Europa League debut, in the 2020–21 group stage home game against Benfica, where Lech was defeated 4–2.

On 18 December, following Lech Poznań's exit from the 2020–21 UEFA Europa League, it was announced that Moder would be recalled from his loan spell on 31 December 2020. Moder made his final appearance for Lech Poznań on 19 December 2020, in a 1–0 home defeat to Wisła Kraków.

==== 2020–21 season ====
Moder made his debut for Brighton on 10 February 2021, starting and playing the full match in the 1–0 away defeat against Leicester City in the FA Cup fifth round. He made his Premier League debut on 27 February coming on as a substitute for Ben White in the 84th minute in a 1–0 away loss at West Bromwich Albion. He made his first start in the league for the "Seagulls" on 20 March in a 3–0 home win over Newcastle United to help Brighton go six points clear of the bottom three. Moder played in Brighton's 3–2 home victory over champions Manchester City on 18 May, with fans returning to football, in which they went from 2–0 down to beat City for the first time in a League game since 1989.

==== 2021–22 season ====
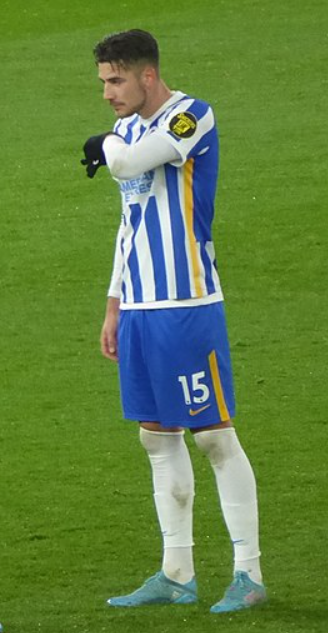
Moder with Brighton & Hove Albion in 2022

Moder set up Albion's equaliser with his ball into the box met by a sliding Neal Maupay with Alexis Mac Allister scoring the winner five minutes later in the 2–1 away victory over Burnley on 14 August in the opening game of the 2021–22 season. Moder scored his first Brighton goal, opening the scoring in the 2–0 away victory over Championship side Cardiff City on 24 August, in the EFL Cup second round in what was also his League Cup debut. He scored his second Brighton goal on 8 January 2022, again coming in cup competition, this time in the FA Cup third round where he scored the equaliser and assisted Maupay's winner in the 2–1 – after extra-time – away victory at Championship side West Bromwich Albion. On 2 April, during the 0–0 home draw against Norwich City, Moder landed awkwardly which resulted in an injury to his anterior cruciate ligament (ACL). As a result, he not only missed the rest of the season but would ruin his hopes of playing at the 2022 World Cup.

==== 2022–23 season ====
Moder missed the whole of the 2022–23 season with the injury he sustained in April 2022. He made his return to training one year after his injury in April 2023.

==== 2023–24 season ====
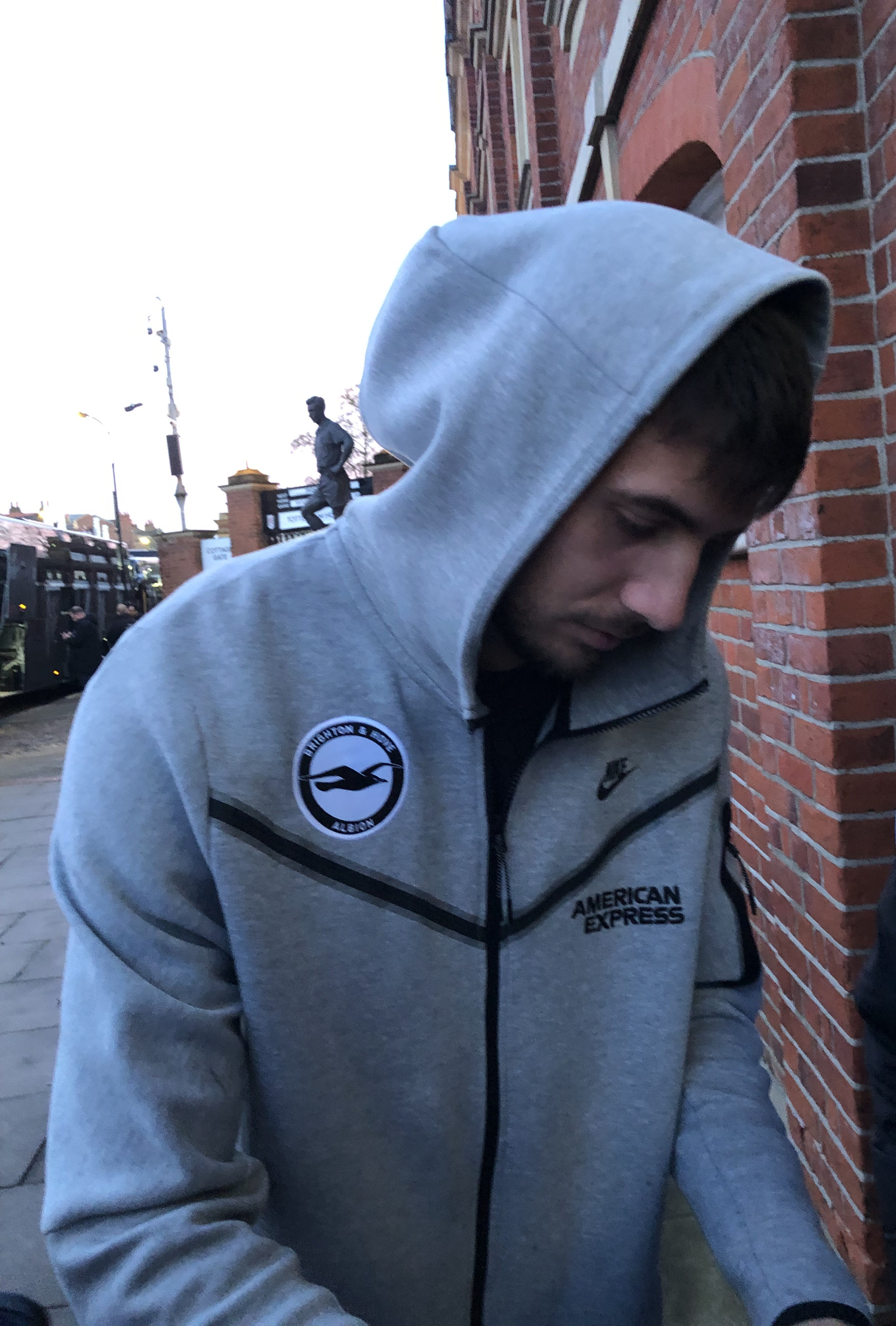
Moder signing autographs in 2024

In early October 2023, Moder was reportedly participating in full training and played in a behind-closed-doors friendly game. Jakub Moder made his first appearance for Brighton since April 2022 when he came on as a sub against Nottingham Forest in Brighton's 3–2 victory on 25 November 2023.

=== Feyenoord ===
On 20 January 2025, Moder transferred to Dutch club Feyenoord on a permanent basis for an undisclosed fee. He made his debut on 2 February, starting in a 2–1 De Klassieker loss to Ajax. On 11 March 2025, Moder scored his first UEFA Champions League goal in the second leg of the Round of 16 tie against Inter Milan, which Feyenoord lost on aggregate 1-4.

== International career ==
On 4 September 2020, Moder debuted for Poland in a 1–0 defeat to the Netherlands in the UEFA Nations League, coming on as a substitute for Piotr Zielinski.

On 7 October 2020, Moder made his first full appearance in a 5–1 friendly victory against Finland. on 11 November 2020, he scored his first goal for the national team just seconds after coming on as a substitute for Arkadiusz Milik, as Poland defeated Ukraine 2–0 in a friendly match. He scored his second goal for his country capitalising on a John Stones mistake in a 2–1 away loss against England on 31 March 2021 in a 2022 World Cup qualifier.

Moder was named in Poland's 26-man squad for Euro 2020 on 17 May 2021, with the tournament taken place in the summer of 2021 due to the previous year's postponement as a result of Coronavirus. Moder came on as an 85th-minute substitute for Leeds United F.C.'s Mateusz Klich in Poland's opening game against Slovakia on 13 June, where The Poles lost 2–1 at the Krestovsky Stadium in Saint Petersburg. He started in Poland's second group match against Spain on 19 June, where he gave away a penalty and was booked. However, Gerard Moreno hit the post, and the match eventually finished at 1–1 at Estadio de La Cartuja in Seville. Moder along with Jan Bednarek of Southampton were out injured for Poland's decisive match against Sweden on 23 June, where Poland lost 3–2 in Saint Petersburg, ending their tournament and finishing bottom of Group E.

Moder was not selected for the 2022 FIFA World Cup due to suffering an injury whilst playing for Brighton that ruled him out for over one year.

He then made the squad for the following tournament, being called up by coach Michał Probierz for UEFA Euro 2024 in Germany in June 2024.

== Career statistics ==
=== Club ===
As of match played 25 October 2026

Appearances and goals by club, season and competition
| Club | Season | League | | | National cup (Note: Includes Polish Cup, FA Cup, KNVB Cup) | | League cup (Note: Includes EFL Cup) | | Europe | | Total | |
| Club | Season | Division | Apps | Goals | Apps | Goals | Apps | Goals | Apps | Goals | Apps | Goals |
|---|---|---|---|---|---|---|---|---|---|---|---|---|
| Lech Poznań II | 2016–17 | III liga, group II | 28 | 5 | — | | — | | — | | 28 | 5 |
| Lech Poznań II | 2017–18 | III liga, group II | 25 | 2 | — | | — | | — | | 25 | 2 |
| Lech Poznań II | 2019–20 | II liga | 8 | 0 | — | | — | | — | | 8 | 0 |
| Lech Poznań II | Total | | 61 | 7 | — | | — | | — | | 61 | 7 |
| Lech Poznań | 2017–18 | Ekstraklasa | 1 | 0 | 0 | 0 | — | | — | | 1 | 0 |
| Lech Poznań | 2019–20 | Ekstraklasa | 26 | 5 | 4 | 0 | — | | — | | 30 | 5 |
| Lech Poznań | 2020–21 | Ekstraklasa | 14 | 4 | 1 | 0 | — | | 10 (Note: Appearances in UEFA Europa League) | 0 | 25 | 4 |
| Lech Poznań | Total | | 41 | 9 | 5 | 0 | — | | 10 | 0 | 56 | 9 |
| Odra Opole (loan) | 2018–19 | I liga | 31 | 4 | 4 | 0 | — | | — | | 35 | 4 |
| Brighton & Hove Albion | 2020–21 | Premier League | 12 | 0 | 1 | 0 | — | | — | | 13 | 0 |
| Brighton & Hove Albion | 2021–22 | Premier League | 28 | 0 | 2 | 1 | 2 | 1 | — | | 32 | 2 |
| Brighton & Hove Albion | 2022–23 | Premier League | 0 | 0 | 0 | 0 | 0 | 0 | — | | 0 | 0 |
| Brighton & Hove Albion | 2023–24 | Premier League | 17 | 0 | 2 | 0 | 0 | 0 | 0 | 0 | 19 | 0 |
| Brighton & Hove Albion | 2024–25 | Premier League | 4 | 0 | 1 | 0 | 2 | 0 | — | | 7 | 0 |
| Brighton & Hove Albion | Total | | 61 | 0 | 6 | 1 | 4 | 1 | 0 | 0 | 71 | 2 |
| Feyenoord | 2024–25 | Eredivisie | 14 | 3 | 1 | 0 | — | | 4 (Note: Appearances in UEFA Champions League) | 1 | 19 | 4 |
| Feyenoord | 2025–26 | Eredivisie | 10 | 1 | 0 | 0 | — | | 1 (Note: Appearances in UEFA Europa League) | 0 | 11 | 1 |
| Feyenoord | 2026–27 | Eredivisie | 1 | 0 | 0 | 0 | — | | 0 | 0 | 1 | 0 |
| Feyenoord | Total | | 25 | 4 | 1 | 0 | — | | 5 | 1 | 31 | 5 |
| Career total | | | 219 | 24 | 16 | 1 | 5 | 1 | 14 | 1 | 254 | 27 |

=== International ===
As of match played 26 March 2026

Appearances and goals by national team and year
| National team | Year | Apps | Goals |
|---|---|---|---|
| Poland | 2020 | 6 | 1 |
| Poland | 2021 | 12 | 1 |
| Poland | 2022 | 2 | 0 |
| Poland | 2024 | 11 | 0 |
| Poland | 2025 | 4 | 0 |
| Poland | 2026 | 1 | 0 |
| Total | | 36 | 2 |

As of match played 26 March 2026. Poland score listed first, score column indicates score after each Moder goal.

List of international goals scored by Jakub Moder
| No. | Date | Venue | Cap | Opponent | Score | Result | Competition |
|---|---|---|---|---|---|---|---|
| 1 | 11 November 2020 | Silesian Stadium, Chorzów, Poland | 4 | Ukraine | 2–0 | 2–0 | Friendly |
| 2 | 31 March 2021 | Wembley Stadium, London, England | 8 | England | 1–1 | 1–2 | 2022 FIFA World Cup qualification |

== Honours ==
Individual

- Ekstraklasa Player of the Year: 2020
- Polish Newcomer of the Year: 2020
- Ekstraklasa Young Player of the Month: June 2020
