= Tymoteusz Klupś =

Polish footballer

Personal information
- Full name: Tymoteusz Klupś
- Date of birth: 26 February 2000 (age 26)
- Place of birth: Poznań, Poland
- Height: 1.79 m (5 ft 10 1/2 in)
- Position: Winger

Team information
- Current team: ŁKS Łomża

Youth career
- –2017: Lech Poznań

Senior career*
Years	Team	Apps	(Gls)
2017–2022	Lech Poznań II	65	(12)
2018–2022	Lech Poznań	30	(1)
2020	→ Piast Gliwice (loan)	2	(0)
2022–2024	Zagłębie Sosnowiec	26	(1)
2024–2025	Unia Swarzędz	60	(8)
2026	ŁKS Łomża	22	(7)
2026–	ŁKS Łomża	0	(0)

International career
2015	Poland U15	2	(0)
2015–2016	Poland U16	9	(2)
2016–2017	Poland U17	3	(0)
2017–2018	Poland U18	6	(0)
2018–2019	Poland U19	4	(0)
- * Club domestic league appearances and goals as of 12:22, 17 October 2026 (UTC)

Tymoteusz Klupś (born 26 February 2000) is a Polish professional footballer who plays as a winger for III liga club ŁKS Łomża.

== Career ==
On 18 February 2018, Klupś made his debut for Lech Poznań in a 2–0 league win against Pogoń Szczecin.

Since coming back from loan at Piast Gliwice in 2020, he remained part of the first team roster but after a string of injuries was confined to only playing for Lech's reserve team.

On 24 June 2022, Klupś joined I liga side Zagłębie Sosnowiec on a two-year deal. On 24 January 2024, he left the club by mutual consent.

On 16 February 2024, III liga club Unia Swarzędz announced the signing of Klupś on a one-and-a-half-year contract. On 12 December 2025, Klupś's contract with Unia was terminated by mutual consent.

On 20 January 2026, Klupś joined fellow fourth-tier side ŁKS Łomża. He and ŁKS mutually agreed to terminate his contract on 14 October 2026. Just three weeks later, on 5 November, Klupś rejoined ŁKS.

== Career statistics ==
As of match played 25 September 2026

Appearances and goals by club, season and competition
Club	Season	League			Polish Cup		Europe		Other		Total	
Club	Season	Division	Apps	Goals	Apps	Goals	Apps	Goals	Apps	Goals	Apps	Goals
Lech Poznań II	2017–18	III liga, gr. II	20	3	—		—		—		20	3
Lech Poznań II	2018–19	III liga, gr. II	4	1	—		—		—		4	1
Lech Poznań II	2019–20	II liga	10	1	—		—		—		10	1
Lech Poznań II	2020–21	II liga	6	2	0	0	—		—		6	2
Lech Poznań II	2021–22	II liga	25	5	1	0	—		—		26	5
Lech Poznań II	Total		65	12	1	0	0	0	—		66	12
Lech Poznań	2017–18	Ekstraklasa	7	0	—		—		—		7	0
Lech Poznań	2018–19	Ekstraklasa	20	1	1	0	0	0	—		21	1
Lech Poznań	2019–20	Ekstraklasa	3	0	0	0	—		—		3	0
Lech Poznań	2020–21	Ekstraklasa	0	0	1	0	0	0	—		1	0
Lech Poznań	Total		30	1	2	0	0	0	—		32	1
Piast Gliwice (loan)	2019–20	Ekstraklasa	2	0	1	0	—		—		3	0
Zagłębie Sosnowiec	2022–23	I liga	18	1	1	0	—		—		19	1
Zagłębie Sosnowiec	2023–24	I liga	8	0	1	0	—		—		9	0
Zagłębie Sosnowiec	Total		26	1	2	0	—		—		28	1
Unia Swarzędz	2023–24	III liga, gr. II	10	2	—		—		—		10	2
Unia Swarzędz	2024–25	III liga, gr. II	32	3	1	0	—		—		33	3
Unia Swarzędz	2025–26	III liga, gr. II	18	3	—		—		—		18	3
Unia Swarzędz	Total		60	8	1	0	—		—		61	8
ŁKS Łomża	2025–26	III liga, gr. I	13	3	—		—		1 (Note: Appearance in II liga promotion/relegation play-offs)	1	14	4
ŁKS Łomża	2026–27	III liga, gr. I	8	3	—		—		—		8	3
ŁKS Łomża	Total		21	6	—		—		1	1	22	7
Career total			204	28	7	0	0	0	1	1	212	29

== Honours ==
Lech Poznań II

- III liga, group II: 2018–19

Unia Swarzędz

- Polish Cup (Greater Poland regionals): 2023–24
