= Tomasz Dejewski =

Polish professional footballer

Personal information
- Full name: Tomasz Dejewski
- Date of birth: 22 April 1995 (age 31)
- Place of birth: Grudziądz, Poland
- Height: 1.91 m (6 ft 3 in)
- Position: Centre-back

Team information
- Current team: Unia Swarzędz
- Number: 5

Youth career
- –2011: Olimpia Grudziądz
- 2011–2013: Lech Poznań

Senior career*
Years	Team	Apps	(Gls)
2013–2016	Lech Poznań II	75	(10)
2016–2019	Warta Poznań	77	(5)
2019–2021	Lech Poznań	13	(0)
2019–2021	Lech Poznań II	28	(1)
2021–2022	Widzew Łódź	16	(1)
2022–2024	Radunia Stężyca	49	(1)
2024–	Unia Swarzędz	61	(3)
- * Club domestic league appearances and goals as of 16:11, 4 June 2026 (UTC)

Tomasz Dejewski (born 22 April 1995) is a Polish professional footballer who plays as a centre-back for III liga club Unia Swarzędz.

== Career statistics ==
As of match played 30 May 2026

Appearances and goals by club, season and competition
Club	Season	League			Polish Cup		Continental		Other		Total	
Club	Season	Division	Apps	Goals	Apps	Goals	Apps	Goals	Apps	Goals	Apps	Goals
Lech Poznań II	2013–14	III liga, gr. C	26	2	—		—		—		26	2
Lech Poznań II	2014–15	III liga, gr. C	20	5	—		—		—		20	5
Lech Poznań II	2015–16	III liga, gr. C	29	3	—		—		—		29	3
Lech Poznań II	Total		75	10	0	0	—		—		75	10
Warta Poznań	2016–17	II liga	28	3	—		—		—		28	3
Warta Poznań	2017–18	II liga	33	2	1	0	—		—		34	2
Warta Poznań	2018–19	I liga	16	0	0	0	—		—		16	0
Warta Poznań	Total		77	5	1	0	—		—		78	5
Lech Poznań	2019–20	Ekstraklasa	8	0	2	1	—		—		10	1
Lech Poznań	2020–21	Ekstraklasa	5	0	2	0	2 (Note: Appearances in UEFA Europa League)	0	—		9	0
Lech Poznań	Total		13	0	4	1	2	0	—		19	1
Lech Poznań II	2019–20	II liga	18	1	—		—		—		18	1
Lech Poznań II	2020–21	II liga	10	0	0	0	—		—		10	0
Lech Poznań II	Total		28	1	0	0	—		—		28	1
Widzew Łódź	2021–22	I liga	16	1	3	0	—		—		19	1
Radunia Stężyca	2022–23	II liga	24	0	2	0	—		—		26	0
Radunia Stężyca	2023–24	II liga	25	1	2	0	—		—		27	1
Radunia Stężyca	Total		49	1	4	0	—		—		53	1
Unia Swarzędz	2024–25	III liga, gr. II	31	1	1	0	—		—		32	1
Unia Swarzędz	2025–26	III liga, gr. II	30	2	—		—		—		30	2
Unia Swarzędz	Total		61	3	1	0	—		—		62	3
Career total			319	21	13	1	2	0	—		334	22
