= Volodymyr Kostevych =

Ukrainian footballer (born 1992)

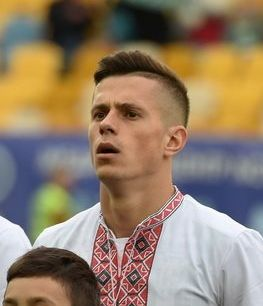
- Kostevych with Karpaty Lviv in 2016

Personal information
- Full name: Volodymyr Yevhenovych Kostevych
- Date of birth: 23 October 1992 (age 34)
- Place of birth: Derevnya, Lviv Oblast, Ukraine
- Height: 1.75 m (5 ft 9 in)
- Position: Left-back

Team information
- Current team: Sokół Kleczew
- Number: 28

Youth career
- –2005: Rukh Vynnyky
- 2005–2009: UFK Lviv
- 2010–2014: Karpaty Lviv

Senior career*
Years	Team	Apps	(Gls)
2010	Karpaty-2 Lviv	8	(1)
2010–2016	Karpaty Lviv	85	(4)
2017–2020	Lech Poznań	100	(1)
2019	Lech Poznań II	3	(1)
2020–2023	Dynamo Kyiv	0	(0)
2021	→ Rukh Lviv (loan)	0	(0)
2023	Warta Poznań	0	(0)
2024–2025	Kotwica Kołobrzeg	20	(1)
2025–	Sokół Kleczew	14	(0)

International career
2013–2014	Ukraine U21	7	(0)
- * Club domestic league appearances and goals as of 18:16, 9 June 2026 (UTC)

Volodymyr Yevhenovych Kostevych (Ukrainian: Володимир Євгенович Костевич, Polish: Wołodymyr Kostewycz; born 23 October 1992) is a Ukrainian professional footballer who plays as a left-back for II liga club Sokół Kleczew.

== Career ==
Kostevych is the product of the UFK Lviv Sportive School System. His first trainer was Oleksandr Voytyuk. In 2010, he signed a contract with Karpaty Lviv. Kostevych made his debut for Karpaty in a match against Chornomorets Odesa on 19 November 2011 in the Ukrainian Premier League.

On 22 March 2023, after stints with Dynamo Kyiv and Rukh Lviv, during which he made no official appearances, he joined Warta Poznań on a deal until the end of the season, with an extension option. Kostevych previously represented another team from Poznań, Lech, from 2017 until 2020.

After his contract with Warta expired, Kostevych stayed at the club to continue training. In early 2024, he underwent trials at Ruch Chorzów, Lech Poznań II, and Arka Gdynia, but was unable to secure a contract.

On 19 August 2024, Kostevych joined Polish I liga club Kotwica Kołobrzeg. He made his debut as a substitute in the 84th minute of a 4–0 away loss to Znicz Pruszków on 25 August, making it his first competitive appearance since 12 July 2020. On 22 June 2025, Kostevych was released from his contract.

On 9 October 2025, Kostevych signed with II liga side Sokół Kleczew.

== Career statistics ==
As of match played 16 May 2026

Appearances and goals by club, season and competition
Club	Season	League			National cup (Note: Includes Ukrainian Cup, Polish Cup)		Europe		Other		Total	
Club	Season	Division	Apps	Goals	Apps	Goals	Apps	Goals	Apps	Goals	Apps	Goals
Karpaty Lviv	2011–12	Ukrainian Premier League	1	0	0	0	0	0	—		1	0
Karpaty Lviv	2012–13	Ukrainian Premier League	0	0	0	0	—		—		0	0
Karpaty Lviv	2013–14	Ukrainian Premier League	21	1	2	0	—		—		23	1
Karpaty Lviv	2014–15	Ukrainian Premier League	23	2	3	1	—		—		26	3
Karpaty Lviv	2015–16	Ukrainian Premier League	24	1	1	0	—		—		25	1
Karpaty Lviv	2016–17	Ukrainian Premier League	16	0	2	0	—		—		18	0
Karpaty Lviv	Total		85	4	8	1	0	0	—		93	5
Lech Poznań	2016–17	Ekstraklasa	17	0	2	0	—		—		19	0
Lech Poznań	2017–18	Ekstraklasa	30	0	1	0	6 (Note: Appearances in UEFA Europa League)	0	—		37	0
Lech Poznań	2018–19	Ekstraklasa	26	1	2	0	4	0	—		32	1
Lech Poznań	2019–20	Ekstraklasa	27	0	4	1	—		—		31	1
Lech Poznań	Total		100	1	9	1	10	0	—		119	2
Lech Poznań II	2018–19	III liga, group II	2	1	—		—		—		2	1
Lech Poznań II	2019–20	II liga	1	0	—		—		—		1	0
Lech Poznań II	Total		3	1	—		—		—		3	1
Dynamo Kyiv	2020–21	Ukrainian Premier League	0	0	0	0	0	0	—		0	0
Dynamo Kyiv	2021–22	Ukrainian Premier League	0	0	0	0	0	0	0	0	0	0
Dynamo Kyiv	2022–23	Ukrainian Premier League	0	0	0	0	0	0	—		0	0
Dynamo Kyiv	Total		0	0	0	0	0	0	0	0	0	0
Rukh Lviv (loan)	2021–22	Ukrainian Premier League	0	0	0	0	—		—		0	0
Warta Poznań	2022–23	Ekstraklasa	0	0	—		—		—		0	0
Kotwica Kołobrzeg	2024–25	I liga	20	1	1	0	—		—		21	1
Sokół Kleczew	2025–26	II liga	14	0	—		—		0	0	14	0
Career total			222	7	18	2	10	0	0	0	250	9

== Honours ==
Lech Poznań II

- III liga, group II: 2018–19
