= Miłosz Mleczko =

Polish footballer (born 1999)

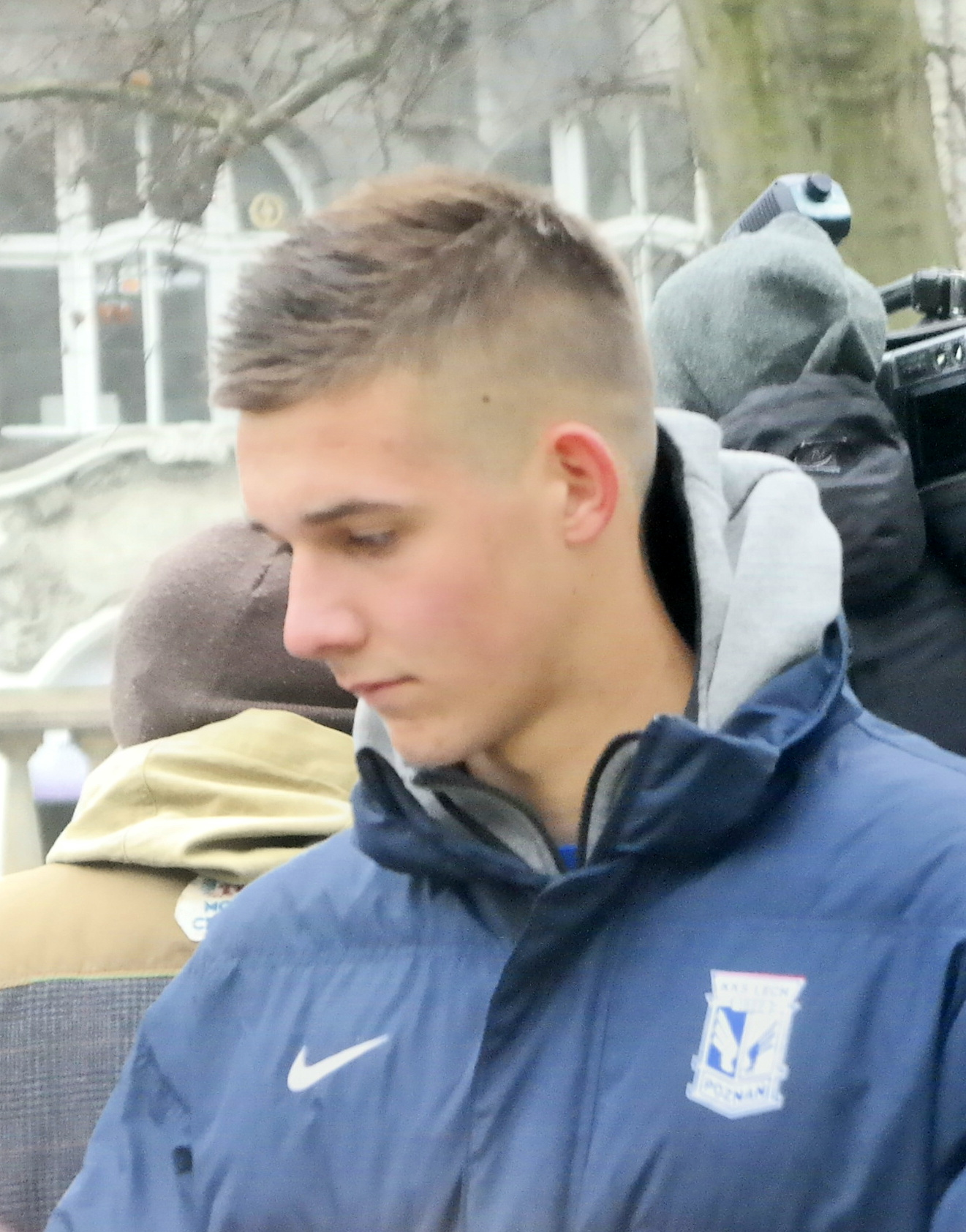
- Mleczko in 2017

Personal information
- Full name: Miłosz Stefan Mleczko
- Date of birth: 1 March 1999 (age 27)
- Place of birth: Gorlice, Poland
- Height: 1.91 m (6 ft 3 in)
- Position: Goalkeeper

Team information
- Current team: Odra Opole
- Number: 1

Youth career
- –2010: Stadion Śląski Chorzów
- 2010–2013: Ruch Chorzów
- 2014–2016: Lech Poznań

Senior career*
Years	Team	Apps	(Gls)
2016–2023	Lech Poznań II	67	(0)
2016–2023	Lech Poznań	1	(0)
2018–2019	→ Puszcza Niepołomice (loan)	33	(0)
2020–2021	→ Widzew Łódź (loan)	13	(0)
2023–2024	Znicz Pruszków	43	(0)
2024–2026	Bruk-Bet Termalica	12	(0)
2026–	Odra Opole	0	(0)

International career
2016–2017	Poland U18	3	(0)
2017	Poland U19	1	(0)
2018–2019	Poland U20	2	(0)
- * Club domestic league appearances and goals as of 21:28, 25 May 2026 (UTC)

Miłosz Stefan Mleczko (born 1 March 1999) is a Polish professional footballer who plays as a goalkeeper for I liga club Odra Opole.

== Club career ==
On 27 August 2020, he was loaned to Widzew Łódź.

On 30 January 2023, after spending nearly nine years at Lech, it was announced he would be leaving the club with immediate effect after terminating his contract by mutual consent.

On 20 February 2023, Mleczko joined I liga side Znicz Pruszków.

On 15 June 2024, he moved on a free transfer to fellow second-tier club Bruk-Bet Termalica Nieciecza.

On 26 June 2026, he signed a one-year contract with Odra Opole, with an option for another twelve months.

== Career statistics ==
As of matches played 20 October 2025

Appearances and goals by club, season and competition
Club	Season	League			Polish Cup		Continental		Other		Total	
Club	Season	Division	Apps	Goals	Apps	Goals	Apps	Goals	Apps	Goals	Apps	Goals
Lech Poznań II	2015–16	III liga, gr. II	3	0	—		—		—		3	0
Lech Poznań II	2016–17	III liga, gr. II	25	0	—		—		—		25	0
Lech Poznań II	2017–18	III liga, gr. II	13	0	—		—		—		13	0
Lech Poznań II	2019–20	II liga	14	0	—		—		—		14	0
Lech Poznań II	2021–22	II liga	11	0	3	0	—		—		14	0
Lech Poznań II	2022–23	II liga	1	0	0	0	—		—		1	0
Lech Poznań II	Total		67	0	3	0	—		—		70	0
Lech Poznań	2019–20	Ekstraklasa	1	0	0	0	—		—		1	0
Puszcza Niepołomice (loan)	2017–18	I liga	1	0	0	0	—		—		1	0
Puszcza Niepołomice (loan)	2018–19	I liga	32	0	3	0	—		—		35	0
Puszcza Niepołomice (loan)	Total		33	0	3	0	—		—		36	0
Widzew Łódź (loan)	2020–21	I liga	13	0	1	0	—		—		14	0
Znicz Pruszków	2022–23	II liga	15	0	0	0	—		—		15	0
Znicz Pruszków	2023–24	I liga	28	0	0	0	—		—		28	0
Znicz Pruszków	Total		43	0	0	0	—		—		43	0
Bruk-Bet Termalica	2024–25	I liga	0	0	0	0	—		—		0	0
Bruk-Bet Termalica	2025–26	Ekstraklasa	12	0	0	0	—		—		12	0
Bruk-Bet Termalica	Total		12	0	0	0	—		—		12	0
Odra Opole	2026–27	I liga	0	0	0	0	—		—		0	0
Career total			169	0	7	0	0	0	0	0	176	0
