= Dani Ramírez =

Spanish footballer (born 1992)

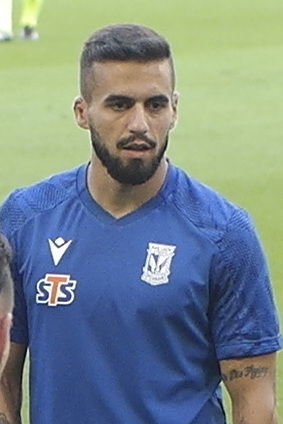
- Ramírez in 2022 with Lech Poznań

Personal information
- Full name: Daniel Ramírez Fernández
- Date of birth: 18 June 1992 (age 34)
- Place of birth: Leganés, Spain
- Height: 1.75 m (5 ft 9 in)
- Positions: Attacking midfielder; central midfielder

Team information
- Current team: East Bengal

Youth career
- 2000–2008: Leganés
- 2008–2011: Real Madrid

Senior career*
| Years | Team | Apps | (Gls) |
| 2011–2014 | Real Madrid B | 102 | (26) |
| 2014–2015 | Valencia | 34 | (12) |
| 2015–2016 | Getafe | 38 | (10) |
| 2016–2017 | Internacional Madrid | 28 | (7) |
| 2017–2018 | Stomil Olsztyn | 34 | (8) |
| 2018–2020 | ŁKS Łódź | 52 | (16) |
| 2020–2022 | Lech Poznań | 72 | (12) |
| 2022–2023 | Zulte Waregem | 28 | (9) |
| 2023–2024 | ŁKS Łódź | 32 | (10) |
| 2024–2025 | Manisa | 34 | (10) |
| 2025–2026 | Punjab | 13 | (4) |
| 2026– | East Bengal | 17 | (5) |
- * Club domestic league appearances and goals as of 08:24, 7 October 2026 (UTC)

Daniel Ramírez Fernández (born 18 June 1992) is a Spanish professional footballer who plays as a midfielder for Indian Super League club East Bengal.

== Career ==
Born in Leganés, Ramírez arrived at the academy of Real Madrid from CD Leganés in 2008. Three years later, he made his debut with the C team, in Tercera División. On 1 July 2014, he signed with Valencia CF and was assigned to the reserve team. On 2 November, he scored his first goal for the club in a 2–1 victory against Hércules CF.

In January 2016, Ramírez moved to Getafe CF and was assigned to the reserve team. On 13 October, he stepped one tier lower and joined Tercera División side Internacional de Madrid CF.

On 25 August 2017, Ramírez moved abroad for the first time in his career and joined Polish second-tier club Stomil Olsztyn on a one-year contract. On 25 June 2018, he moved to fellow league club ŁKS Łódź on a two-year deal.

On 6 February 2020, he signed a 3 1/2-year contract with Ekstraklasa side Lech Poznań. Initially a centre-piece of Lech's offensive line-up, he was relegated to featuring mostly off the bench after the appointment of manager Maciej Skorża in April 2021. Two months after winning the league title, on 28 July 2022, Ramírez terminated his contract with Lech by mutual consent.

On 1 August 2022, Ramírez signed a contract with Zulte Waregem in Belgium for two years with an option to extend.

On 4 July 2023, Ramírez returned to ŁKS, signing a one-year deal with an option for another year. He scored nine goals in 32 league appearances, as ŁKS experienced another yo-yo year and was relegated after just one season in the top flight. The option on his contract was not exercised, and he left the club on 30 June 2024.

On 1 August 2024, he signed a one-year contract with Turkish second-tier club Manisa, with an option for a further year.

== Career statistics ==
As of match played on 4 November 2024

Appearances and goals by club, season and competition
| Club | Season | League | | | National cup (Note: Includes Polish Cup, Belgian Cup) | | Continental | | Other | | Total | |
| Club | Season | Division | Apps | Goals | Apps | Goals | Apps | Goals | Apps | Goals | Apps | Goals |
|---|---|---|---|---|---|---|---|---|---|---|---|---|
| Real Madrid B | 2011–12 | Tercera División | 33 | 7 | — | | — | | 1 (Note: Appearances in relegation Play-offs) | 1 | 34 | 8 |
| Real Madrid B | 2012–13 | Segunda División B | 33 | 10 | — | | — | | — | | 33 | 10 |
| Real Madrid B | 2013–14 | Segunda División B | 36 | 9 | — | | — | | 0 | 0 | 36 | 9 |
| Real Madrid B | Total | | 102 | 26 | — | | — | | 1 | 1 | 103 | 27 |
| Valencia | 2014–15 | Segunda División B | 32 | 3 | — | | — | | — | | 32 | 3 |
| Valencia | 2015–16 | Segunda División B | 1 | 0 | — | | — | | — | | 1 | 0 |
| Valencia | Total | | 33 | 3 | — | | — | | — | | 33 | 3 |
| Getafe | 2015–16 | Segunda División B | 18 | 3 | — | | — | | — | | 18 | 3 |
| Internacional Madrid | 2016–17 | Tercera División | 19 | 4 | — | | — | | — | | 19 | 4 |
| Stomil Olsztyn | 2017–18 | I liga | 24 | 1 | 0 | 0 | — | | — | | 24 | 1 |
| ŁKS Łódź | 2018–19 | I liga | 31 | 9 | 0 | 0 | — | | — | | 31 | 9 |
| ŁKS Łódź | 2019–20 | Ekstraklasa | 20 | 6 | 1 | 0 | — | | — | | 21 | 6 |
| ŁKS Łódź | Total | | 51 | 15 | 1 | 0 | — | | — | | 52 | 15 |
| Lech Poznań | 2019–20 | Ekstraklasa | 16 | 4 | 2 | 2 | — | | — | | 18 | 6 |
| Lech Poznań | 2020–21 | Ekstraklasa | 30 | 6 | 4 | 2 | 10 (Note: Appearance in UEFA Europa League) | 1 | — | | 44 | 9 |
| Lech Poznań | 2021–22 | Ekstraklasa | 26 | 1 | 5 | 1 | — | | — | | 31 | 2 |
| Lech Poznań | 2022–23 | Ekstraklasa | 0 | 0 | 0 | 0 | 0 | 0 | 1 (Note: Appearance in Polish Super Cup) | 0 | 1 | 0 |
| Lech Poznań | Total | | 72 | 11 | 11 | 5 | 10 | 1 | 1 | 0 | 94 | 17 |
| Zulte Waregem | 2022–23 | Belgian Pro League | 13 | 0 | 3 | 0 | — | | — | | 16 | 0 |
| ŁKS Łódź | 2023–24 | Ekstraklasa | 32 | 9 | 2 | 0 | — | | — | | 34 | 9 |
| Manisa | 2024–25 | TFF 1. Lig | 11 | 2 | 0 | 0 | — | | — | | 11 | 2 |
| Career total | | | 375 | 74 | 17 | 5 | 10 | 1 | 2 | 1 | 404 | 79 |

== Honours ==
Lech Poznań

- Ekstraklasa: 2021–22

Individual

- I liga Team of the Season: 2018–19
