= Mihai Răduț =

Romanian footballer (born 1990)

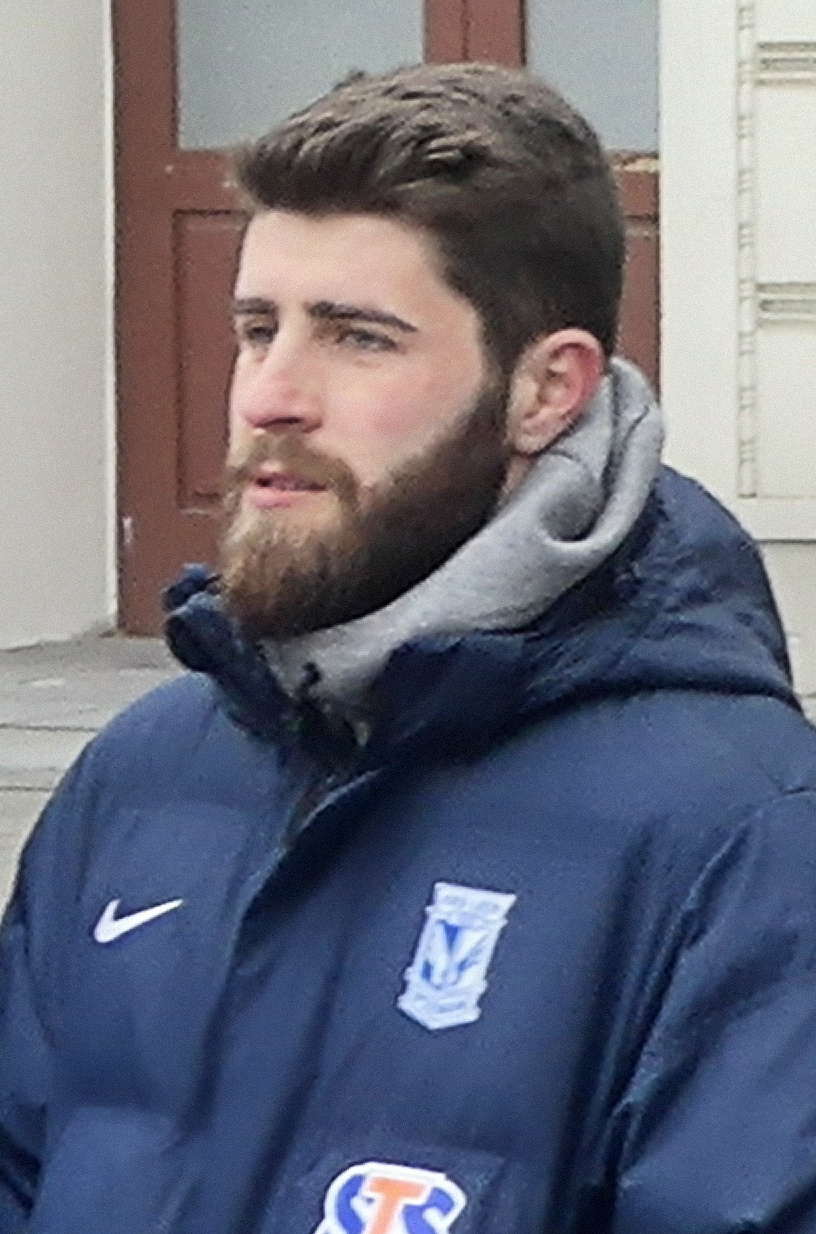
- Răduț with Lech Poznań in 2017

Personal information
- Full name: Mihai Cosmin Răduț
- Date of birth: 18 March 1990 (age 36)
- Place of birth: Slatina, Romania
- Height: 1.78 m (5 ft 10 in)
- Position: Midfielder

Youth career
- 2000–2001: CSȘ Slatina
- 2001–2004: Alprom Slatina
- 2002–2003: → Aripi Pitești (loan)
- 2004–2007: Ardealul Cluj
- 2007–2008: Sporting CP

Senior career*
Years	Team	Apps	(Gls)
2009–2010	Internațional Curtea de Argeș	45	(6)
2010–2014	Steaua București	43	(0)
2012–2013	→ Pandurii Târgu Jiu (loan)	30	(6)
2014–2016	Pandurii Târgu Jiu	57	(5)
2016	Hatta	2	(0)
2017–2019	Lech Poznań	44	(1)
2019	Lech Poznań II	5	(1)
2019–2021	Astra Giurgiu	51	(5)
2021–2022	Aris Limassol	10	(0)
2022–2024	Voluntari	40	(1)
2024–2025	FC U Craiova	11	(1)
Total		338	(26)

International career
2008	Romania U19	1	(1)
2010–2012	Romania U21	7	(3)
2010–2013	Romania	3	(0)
- * Club domestic league appearances and goals as of 9 March 2025

Mihai Cosmin Răduț (born 18 March 1990) is a Romanian former professional footballer who played as a midfielder.

Răduț started out at Internațional Curtea de Argeș in 2009, and one year later earned a transfer to Steaua București. He also represented Pandurii Târgu Jiu, Astra Giurgiu and Voluntari in his native country, while abroad he featured for Hatta Club, Lech Poznań and Aris Limassol.

Internationally, Răduț made his full debut for Romania in a 3–2 friendly loss to Ukraine in May 2010.

== Club career ==
Răduț made his professional debut for Internațional Curtea de Argeș on 31 August 2009, in a 1–0 Liga I loss to Oțelul Galați. He ended his debut season with four goals from 26 appearances.

On 17 June 2010, Răduț was transferred to FC Steaua București for a rumoured fee of €1 million. He registered his debut in a 2–1 league defeat of Universitatea Cluj, on 25 July 2010.

== International career ==
Răduț represented Romania at and under-19 and under-21 levels, before earning his senior debut in a 3–2 friendly loss to Ukraine in Lviv, on 29 May 2010.

== Personal life ==
Răduț's father, Valentin, was also a professional footballer. He played in the top flight for Olt Scornicești.

== Career statistics ==
=== Club ===
As of match played 9 March 2025

Appearances and goals by club, season and competition
Club	Season	League			National cup (Note: Includes Cupa României, UAE President's Cup, Polish Cup)		Continental		Other		Total	
Club	Season	Division	Apps	Goals	Apps	Goals	Apps	Goals	Apps	Goals	Apps	Goals
Internațional	2008–09	Liga II	18	2	0	0	—		—		18	2
Internațional	2009–10	Liga I	27	4	0	0	—		—		27	4
Internațional	Total		45	6	0	0	—		—		45	6
Steaua București	2010–11	Liga I	20	0	2	0	6 (Note: Appearances in UEFA Europa League)	0	—		28	0
Steaua București	2011–12	Liga I	15	0	1	0	0	0	—		16	0
Steaua București	2013–14	Liga I	8	0	1	2	1 (Note: Appearance in UEFA Champions League)	0	—		10	2
Steaua București	Total		43	0	4	2	7	0	—		54	2
Pandurii Târgu Jiu (loan)	2012–13	Liga I	30	6	1	0	—		—		31	6
Pandurii Târgu Jiu	2014–15	Liga I	26	1	3	0	—		4 (Note: Appearance(s) in Cupa Ligii)	1	33	2
Pandurii Târgu Jiu	2015–16	Liga I	31	4	0	0	—		1	0	32	4
Pandurii Târgu Jiu	Total		87	11	4	0	—		5	1	96	12
Hatta	2016–17	UAE Pro-League	2	0	4	0	—		—		6	0
Lech Poznań	2016–17	Ekstraklasa	13	1	3	0	—		—		16	1
Lech Poznań	2017–18	Ekstraklasa	22	0	1	0	3	0	—		26	0
Lech Poznań	2018–19	Ekstraklasa	9	0	2	0	4	0	—		15	0
Lech Poznań	Total		44	1	6	0	7	0	—		57	1
Lech Poznań II	2018–19	III liga, gr. II	5	1	—		—		—		5	1
Astra Giurgiu	2019–20	Liga I	28	4	1	0	—		—		29	4
Astra Giurgiu	2020–21	Liga I	23	1	3	1	—		—		26	2
Astra Giurgiu	Total		51	5	4	1	—		—		55	6
Aris Limassol	2021–22	Cypriot First Division	10	0	0	0	—		—		10	0
Voluntari	2022–23	Liga I	22	1	3	0	—		1 (Note: Appearance in Liga I European play-offs)	0	26	1
Voluntari	2023–24	Liga I	18	0	3	0	—		—		21	0
Voluntari	Total		40	1	6	0	—		1	0	47	1
FC U Craiova	2024–25	Liga II	11	1	—		—		—		11	1
Career total			338	26	28	3	14	0	6	1	386	30

=== International ===
As of match played 2 February 2013

Appearances and goals by national team and year
National team	Year	Apps	Goals
Romania
Romania	2010	2	0
Romania	2013	1	0
Total		3	0

== Honours ==
Steaua București

- Liga I: 2013–14
- Cupa României: 2010–11; runner-up: 2013–14
- Supercupa României: 2013; runner-up: 2011

Pandurii Târgu Jiu

- Cupa Ligii runner-up: 2014–15

Lech Poznań

- Polish Cup runner-up: 2016–17

Lech Poznań II

- III liga, gr. II: 2018–19

Astra Giurgiu

- Cupa României runner-up: 2020–21
