= Paweł Tomczyk =

Polish footballer (born 1998)

Personal information
- Full name: Paweł Tomczyk
- Date of birth: 4 May 1998 (age 28)
- Place of birth: Poznań, Poland
- Height: 1.84 m (6 ft 0 in)
- Position: Forward

Team information
- Current team: Chełmianka Chełm
- Number: 9

Youth career
- –2016: Lech Poznań

Senior career*
Years	Team	Apps	(Gls)
2016–2021	Lech Poznań II	49	(33)
2017–2021	Lech Poznań	29	(5)
2017–2018	→ Podbeskidzie (loan)	31	(11)
2019	→ Piast Gliwice (loan)	4	(2)
2020	→ Stal Mielec (loan)	11	(1)
2021–2022	Widzew Łódź	32	(5)
2022	Mioveni	11	(1)
2022–2023	Politehnica Iași	12	(1)
2023–2024	Polonia Warsaw	42	(9)
2024–2025	Podbeskidzie	7	(1)
2025	→ Resovia (loan)	11	(2)
2025–	Chełmianka Chełm	34	(14)

International career
2016	Poland U19	2	(1)
2017–2020	Poland U21	15	(4)
- * Club domestic league appearances and goals as of 17:05, 4 June 2026 (UTC)

Paweł Tomczyk (born 4 May 1998) is a Polish professional footballer who plays as a forward for III liga club Chełmianka Chełm.

== Club career ==
On 20 July 2017, he was loaned to I liga side Podbeskidzie Bielsko-Biała.

In 2019, he was loaned to Piast Gliwice.

== Career statistics ==
As of match played 30 May 2026

Appearances and goals by club, season and competition
Club	Season	League			National cup (Note: Includes Polish Cup, Cupa României)		Europe		Other		Total	
Club	Season	Division	Apps	Goals	Apps	Goals	Apps	Goals	Apps	Goals	Apps	Goals
Lech Poznań II	2015–16	III liga, gr. II	5	2	—		—		—		5	2
Lech Poznań II	2016–17	III liga, gr. II	29	20	—		—		—		29	20
Lech Poznań II	2018–19	III liga, gr. II	3	5	—		—		—		3	5
Lech Poznań II	2019–20	II liga	12	6	—		—		—		12	6
Lech Poznań II	Total		49	33	—		—		—		49	33
Lech Poznań	2016–17	Ekstraklasa	4	0	0	0	—		0	0	4	0
Lech Poznań	2018–19	Ekstraklasa	10	2	0	0	3 (Note: Appearances in UEFA Europa League)	0	—		13	2
Lech Poznań	2019–20	Ekstraklasa	15	3	2	0	—		—		17	3
Lech Poznań	Total		29	5	2	0	3	0	0	0	34	5
Podbeskidzie (loan)	2017–18	I liga	31	11	3	1	—		—		34	12
Piast Gliwice (loan)	2018–19	Ekstraklasa	4	2	—		—		—		4	2
Stal Mielec (loan)	2020–21	Ekstraklasa	11	1	2	1	—		—		13	2
Widzew Łódź	2020–21	I liga	19	2	—		—		—		19	2
Widzew Łódź	2021–22	I liga	13	3	1	0	—		—		14	3
Widzew Łódź	Total		32	5	1	0	—		—		33	5
CS Mioveni	2021–22	Liga I	11	1	—		—		—		11	1
Politehnica Iași	2022–23	Liga II	12	1	2	0	—		—		14	1
Polonia Warsaw	2022–23	II liga	13	7	—		—		—		13	7
Polonia Warsaw	2023–24	I liga	29	2	3	3	—		—		32	5
Polonia Warsaw	Total		42	9	3	3	—		—		45	12
Podbeskidzie	2024–25	II liga	7	1	1	0	—		—		8	1
Resovia (loan)	2024–25	II liga	11	2	—		—		—		11	2
Chełmianka Chełm	2025–26	III liga, gr. IV	34	14	—		—		—		34	14
Total			273	85	14	5	3	0	0	0	290	90

== Honours ==
Lech Poznań II

- III liga, group II: 2018–19

Piast Gliwice

- Ekstraklasa: 2018–19

Politehnica Iași

- Liga II: 2022–23

Polonia Warsaw

- II liga: 2022–23
