= Lech Poznań II =

Fourth tier Polish football club

- Full name: Kolejowy Klub Sportowy Lech Poznań II
- Nickname: Kolejorz (The Railwayman)
- Ground: KKS Lech Poznań Academy Stadium
- Capacity: 4,624
- Co-chairmen: Karol Klimczak; Piotr Rutkowski
- Manager: Joop Oosterveld
- League: III liga, group II
- 2025–26: III liga, group II, 7th of 18
- Website: http://www.lechpoznan.pl/
Home colours	Away colours

Lech Poznań II (Polish pronunciation: [lɛx ˈpɔznaj̃]) is the reserve team and the senior academy team of Lech Poznań, a Polish professional football club based in Poznań. The team and its facilities are based in Wronki.

They currently play in group II of the fourth tier of the league pyramid.

== Overview ==
The team is intended to be the final step between Lech's academy and the first team, and usually consists promising youngsters between the age of 15 and 22, with a few veteran players drafted in to provide experience.

Occasionally, first team players are included in line-ups, to give them an opportunity to regain match fitness.

== History ==
They are known for the remarkable feat of winning all 36 games in the 1994–95 IV liga season; it was the last season where 2 points were awarded for a win (instead of 3 points), which meant they finished on 72 points (would have been 108 in a three-point system).

They gained promotion in the 2003–04 season to the third tier after winning the league and beating Jarota Jarocin 2–0 twice, 4–0 on aggregate. In that same season, they reached the 1st round of the Polish Cup, but were knocked out by Górnik Konin following a 3–1 loss. After the 2006–07 season, the reserve teams were scrapped in favour of a central youth league, meaning that between 2007 and 2013 the team ceased to exist. They were reinstated to their previous league position for the 2013–14 season.

They won promotion to II liga at the end of the 2018–19 season, making them the highest placed reserves team in Poland at the time. They remained at the third tier for five years, before being relegated from the 2023–24 II liga after finishing 16th.

== Honours ==
- III liga
  - Greater Poland North
    - Champions: 2003–04
    - Runners-up: 2001–02, 2002–03
  - Group II
    - Champions: 2018–19
    - Runners-up: 2016–17
- Polish Cup (Greater Poland regionals)
  - Winners: 2002–03
- Polish Cup (Poznań regionals)
  - Winners: 1990–91, 1996–97, 2002–03
  - Runners-up: 2004–05, 2005–06 2013–14, 2014–15, 2015–16

== Players ==
=== Current squad ===
As of 19 August 2026

Note: Flags indicate national team as defined under FIFA eligibility rules; some limited exceptions apply. Players may hold more than one non-FIFA nationality.

No.	Pos.	Nation	Player
1	GK	POL	Adrian Kostrzewski
2	DF	POL	Jakub Skowroński
3	DF	POL	Jakub Falkiewicz
4	DF	POL	Patryk Kowalski
5	DF	POL	Hubert Mich
6	MF	BLR	Serafim Bakhno
7	MF	POL	Igor Stankiewicz
8	DF	POL	Xavier Koral
9	FW	POL	Filip Tonder
10	MF	POL	Radosław Gołębiowski
11	FW	POL	Wojciech Szymczak
12	GK	POL	Wojciech Zborek

No.	Pos.	Nation	Player
13	DF	POL	Filip Tokar
14	DF	POL	Aleksander Klimkiewicz
16	MF	POL	Igor Draszczyk
17	MF	POL	Alan Majewski
19	MF	POL	Daniel Chejdysz
20	FW	POL	Igor Owczarek
21	MF	POL	Miłosz Noski
22	MF	POL	Eryk Śledziński
23	MF	POL	Mateusz Cegiełka
24	MF	POL	Maksymilian Dziuba (captain)
25	MF	POL	Karol Delikat
27	DF	POL	Piotr Barczak

=== Out on loan ===
Note: Flags indicate national team as defined under FIFA eligibility rules; some limited exceptions apply. Players may hold more than one non-FIFA nationality.

No.	Pos.	Nation	Player
15	MF	POL	Patryk Prajsnar (at Stal Mielec until 30 June 2027)
—	GK	POL	Wojciech Zborek (at Unia Swarzędz until 30 June 2027)

== Coaching staff ==
As of 9 August 2026

Position	Staff
(Netherlands) Joop Oosterveld	Head coach
(Poland) Karol Bartkowiak	Assistant coach
(Poland) Maciej Wilusz	Assistant coach
(Poland) Radosław Hołubiec	Goalkeeping coach
(Hungary) Tamas Kovacs	Fitness coach
(Spain) Armando Camara Martinez	Fitness coach
(Poland) Paweł Rzeszowski	Match analyst
(Poland) Damian Bartkiewicz	Team doctor
(Poland) Hubert Rewers	Physiotherapist
(Poland) Tomasz Małek	Team manager

== Stadium ==
The Lech Poznań Academy Stadium in Wronki is a small, modern venue with undersoil heating. The ground holds just under 5,000 spectators – a third of the town's population – and has floodlighting. The stadium staged three games during the 2006 UEFA U-19 European Championships held in Poland. It used to be the home of Amica Wronki.

== Bibliography ==
- Jarosław Owsiański, Lech Poznań – przemilczana prawda, Poznań: Drukarnia Beyga, 2017, 978-83-939221-6-1.
