= 2025 Polish Super Cup =

Football competition

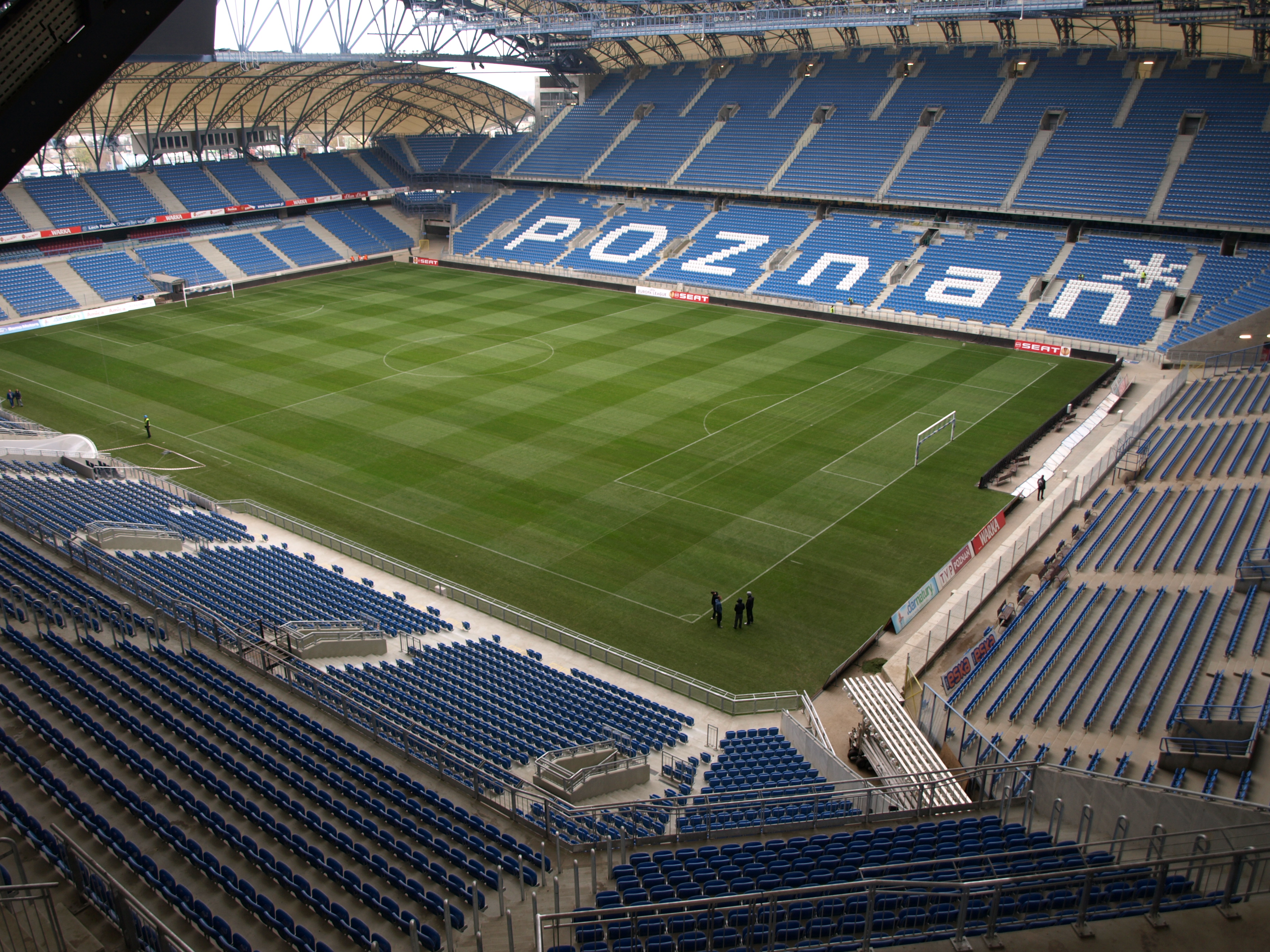
- The Enea Stadion in Poznań hosted the final.
Lech Poznań	Legia Warsaw
1	2
- Date: 13 July 2025
- Venue: Enea Stadion, Poznań
- Referee: Łukasz Kuźma (Białystok)
- Attendance: 40,368
- Weather: 23 °C (73 °F)

The 2025 Polish Super Cup was the 34th Polish Super Cup, an annual Polish football match played between the reigning winners of the Ekstraklasa and Polish Cup. The 2024–25 Ekstraklasa champions Lech Poznań faced 2024–25 Polish Cup winners Legia Warsaw.

Legia took a two-goal lead in the first half of the match. In the second half, Lech scored, but couldn't manage to equalize.

Legia secured their 6th trophy, drawing level with Lech in terms of Super Cup titles, but due to having participated in more Super Cup matches overall, Legia moved ahead at the top of the all-time standings.

== Match ==
13 July 2025
18:00 CEST (UTC+02:00)

Lech Poznań	1–2	Legia Warsaw
Szymczak 81'	90minut.pl PZPN	Wszołek 33'; Shkurin 43'

Enea Stadion, Poznań
Attendance: 40,368
Referee: Łukasz Kuźma (Białystok)

Lech Poznań	Legia Warsaw

GK	41	(Poland) Bartosz Mrozek
LB	15	(Poland) Michał Gurgul
CB	16	(Croatia) Antonio Milić
CB	3	(Sweden) Alex Douglas		(substituted off) 70'
RB	20	(Poland) Robert Gumny		(substituted off) 70'
CM	43	(Poland) Antoni Kozubal	(yellow card) 37'
CM	24	(Poland) Filip Jagiełło
AM	7	(Portugal) Afonso Sousa
LW	19	(Norway) Bryan Fiabema		(substituted off) 70'
CF	9	(Sweden) Mikael Ishak (c)
RW	2	(Portugal) Joel Pereira
Substitutes:
GK	31	(Poland) Krzysztof Bąkowski
DF	5	(Sweden) Elias Andersson
DF	18	(Poland) Bartosz Salamon
DF	27	(Poland) Wojciech Mońka
DF	72	(Poland) Mateusz Skrzypczak	(substituted on) 70'
MF	14	(Sweden) Leo Bengtsson	(substituted on) 70'	(yellow card) 77'
MF	53	(Poland) Sammy Dudek
MF	56	(Poland) Kornel Lisman
FW	17	(Poland) Filip Szymczak	(substituted on) 70'	(yellow card) 73'
Manager:
(Denmark) Niels Frederiksen

GK	1	(Poland) Kacper Tobiasz
LB	23	(Poland) Patryk Kun
CB	3	(Democratic Republic of the Congo) Steve Kapuadi
CB	24	(Poland) Jan Ziółkowski
RB	7	(Poland) Paweł Wszołek	(yellow card) 90+4'
CM	8	(Poland) Rafał Augustyniak (c)	(yellow card) 89'
AM	25	(Japan) Ryōya Morishita	(yellow card) 22'	(substituted off) 75'
AM	22	(Colombia) Juergen Elitim		(substituted off) 85'
LW	9	(France) Migouel Alfarela		(substituted off) 67'
CF	17	(Belarus) Ilya Shkurin		(substituted off) 85'
RW	11	(Poland) Kacper Chodyna		(substituted off) 75'
Substitutes:
GK	27	(Poland) Gabriel Kobylak
DF	4	(Switzerland) Marco Burch
DF	12	(Serbia) Radovan Pankov
DF	30	(Slovenia) Petar Stojanović	(substituted on) 75'	(yellow card) 86'
MF	21	(Armenia) Vahan Bichakhchyan	(substituted on) 75'
MF	53	(Poland) Wojciech Urbański	(substituted on) 85'
MF	67	(Poland) Bartosz Kapustka	(substituted on) 67'
FW	18	(Cameroon) Jean-Pierre Nsame	(substituted on) 85'
FW	28	(Spain) Marc Gual
Manager:
(Romania) Edward Iordănescu

Match rules

- 90 minutes.
- Penalty shoot-out if scores still level.
- Nine named substitutes.
- Maximum of five substitutions.

== See also ==
- 2025–26 Ekstraklasa
- 2025–26 Polish Cup
