= Wojciech Mońka =

Polish footballer (born 2007)

Personal information
- Date of birth: 18 January 2007 (age 19)
- Place of birth: Poznań, Poland
- Position: Centre-back

Team information
- Current team: Lech Poznań
- Number: 27

Youth career
- –2017: 1922 Lechia Kostrzyn
- 2017–2023: Lech Poznań

Senior career*
Years	Team	Apps	(Gls)
2023–2025	Lech Poznań II	26	(1)
2024–	Lech Poznań	37	(0)

International career^{‡}
2021–2022	Poland U15	6	(1)
2024	Poland U17	6	(0)
2024	Poland U18	7	(1)
2025	Poland U19	10	(0)
2026–	Poland U21	2	(0)
- * Club domestic league appearances and goals as of 11:01, 16 November 2026 (UTC) ‡ National team caps and goals as of 12:05, 6 October 2026 (UTC)

Wojciech Mońka (born 18 January 2007) is a Polish professional footballer who plays as a centre-back for Ekstraklasa club Lech Poznań.

== Club career ==
Born in Poznań, Mońka started his youth career with 1922 Lechia Kostrzyn before joining the youth ranks of Lech Poznań at the age of 10. Over the years, he won the Central Junior League under-15 and under-19 titles as he moved through each stage of Lech's academy.

In April 2023, Mońka was promoted to the reserve team. He made his first professional appearance on 6 October 2023, playing the full 90 minutes of a 1–3 II liga loss to Stal Stalowa Wola.

On 3 August 2024, Mońka made his debut for Lech's first team as a late substitute in a 3–1 league win over Lechia Gdańsk. In his second Ekstraklasa appearance and first start for Lech, he provided an assist to Afonso Sousa in a 2–1 away loss to Górnik Zabrze on 6 December 2024. On 12 March 2025, his deal was extended until June 2029. Mońka started featuring more regularly towards the end of the season, as Lech ended the 2024–25 campaign by winning their ninth Ekstraklasa title in the final round of the season.

Mońka was dropped back to a back-up role at the start of the 2025–26 season. He made his second league start of the season on 23 November 2025 in a 4–1 win over Radomiak Radom. He then started 25 out of the remaining 28 games of the season, including the Ekstraklasa, the Polish Cup and the UEFA Conference League, establishing himself as Lech's primary centre-back. At the conclusion of Lech's successful title defense, Mońka won the Ekstraklasa Defender of the Season award.

== International career ==
A youth international for Poland, Mońka earned his first cap for the Poland under-15s in a 2–0 friendly win against Ireland on 12 October 2021.

He received his maiden call-up to the Poland senior team on 18 September 2026, for UEFA Nations League matches against Bosnia and Herzegovina, Sweden and Romania. He remained unused in the first three games of the international break before being sent to join the Poland under-21 team on 3 October.

== Career statistics ==
As of match played 15 October 2026

Appearances and goals by club, season and competition
Club	Season	League			Polish Cup		Europe		Other		Total	
Club	Season	Division	Apps	Goals	Apps	Goals	Apps	Goals	Apps	Goals	Apps	Goals
Lech Poznań II	2023–24	II liga	9	0	0	0	—		—		9	0
Lech Poznań II	2024–25	III liga, gr. II	17	1	1	0	—		—		18	1
Lech Poznań II	Total		26	1	1	0	—		—		27	1
Lech Poznań	2024–25	Ekstraklasa	9	0	0	0	—		—		9	0
Lech Poznań	2025–26	Ekstraklasa	19	0	2	0	10 (Note: One appearance in UEFA Champions League, two appearances in UEFA Europa League, seven appearances in UEFA Conference League)	0	0	0	31	0
Lech Poznań	2026–27	Ekstraklasa	9	0	0	0	8 (Note: Two appearances in UEFA Champions League, six appearances in UEFA Europa League)	0	1 (Note: Appearance in Polish Super Cup)	0	18	0
Lech Poznań	Total		37	0	2	0	18	0	1	0	58	0
Career total			63	1	3	0	18	0	1	0	85	1

== Honours ==
Lech Poznań

- Ekstraklasa: 2024–25, 2025–26
- Polish Super Cup: 2026

Individual

- Ekstraklasa Defender of the Season: 2025–26
- Ekstraklasa Young Player of the Month: February 2026, May 2026
