= 2024–25 Lech Poznań season =

Lech Poznań
2024–25 season
- Co-chairmen: Karol Klimczak; Since 1 November 2011; Piotr Rutkowski; Since 27 January 2021
- Manager: Niels Frederiksen; Since 14 May 2024
- Stadium: Enea Stadion
- Ekstraklasa: 1st
- Polish Cup: First round
- Top goalscorer: League: Mikael Ishak (21 goals); All: Mikael Ishak (21 goals)
- Highest home attendance: Ekstraklasa: 41,109 vs. Piast (24 May 2025)
- Lowest home attendance: Ekstraklasa: 16,610 vs. Zagłębie (23 February 2025)
- Average home league attendance: 28,947
- Biggest win: Ekstraklasa: Lech 8–1 Puszcza (3 May 2025)
- Biggest defeat: Ekstraklasa: Puszcza 2–0 Lech (2 November 2024); Śląsk 3–1 Lech (29 March 2025)
Home colours	Away colours	Third colours

The 2024–25 season was Lech Poznań's 103rd season in existence and the club's 23rd consecutive season in the top flight of Polish football. In addition to the domestic league, Lech Poznań participated in this season's edition of the Polish Cup. The season covers the period from 1 July 2024 to 30 June 2025.

Lech Poznań played their official home matches at the Stadion Miejski branded on 24 July 2023 as Enea Stadion for sponsorship reasons for four next seasons.

== Club ==
=== Coaching staff ===
Position	Staff
Manager	(Denmark) Niels Frederiksen
Assistant manager	(Norway) Sindre Tjelmeland
Assistant coaches	(Poland) Dariusz Dudka (Poland) Hubert Wędzonka
Goalkeeping coach	(Poland) Dominik Kubiak
Fitness coaches	(Czech Republic) Antonin Čepek (Poland) Karol Kikut (Poland) Michał Włodarczyk (since 3 April 2025)
Match analyst	(Poland) Hubert Barański
Head of medical department	(Poland) Rafał Hejna
Team doctors	(Poland) Tomasz Jaśkowiak (Poland) Patrick Buliński (Poland) Aleksander Zych
Physiotherapists	(Poland) Maciej Łopatka (Poland) Marcin Lis (Poland) Maciej Smuniewski (Poland) Bartosz Górecki
Dietician	(Poland) Patryk Wiśniewski
Team manager	(Poland) Mariusz Skrzypczak
Kit manager	(Poland) Sławomir Mizgalski
Head of the scientific department	(Poland) Bartłomiej Grzelak
Cook	(Poland) Artur Dzierzbicki

Source: Lech Poznań

=== Management ===
Position	Staff
Chairman	(Poland) Karol Klimczak (Poland) Piotr Rutkowski
Sporting director	(Poland) Tomasz Rząsa

Source: Lech Poznań

== Current squad ==
As of 19 February 2025

Note: Flags indicate national team as defined under FIFA eligibility rules; some limited exceptions apply. Players may hold more than one non-FIFA nationality.

No.	Pos.	Nation	Player
2	DF	POR	Joel Pereira
3	DF	SWE	Alex Douglas
7	MF	POR	Afonso Sousa
8	MF	IRN	Ali Gholizadeh
9	FW	SWE	Mikael Ishak (captain)
10	MF	SWE	Patrik Wålemark
11	MF	FIN	Daniel Håkans
15	DF	POL	Michał Gurgul
16	DF	CRO	Antonio Milić
18	DF	POL	Bartosz Salamon
19	FW	NOR	Bryan Fiabema
21	MF	BIH	Dino Hotić
22	MF	POL	Radosław Murawski (Vice-captain)
23	MF	ISL	Gísli Þórðarson

No.	Pos.	Nation	Player
24	MF	POL	Filip Jagiełło
25	DF	SWE	Filip Dagerstål
29	DF	DEN	Rasmus Carstensen (on loan from (Germany) 1. FC Köln)
31	GK	POL	Mateusz Mędrala
35	GK	POL	Filip Bednarek
41	GK	POL	Bartosz Mrozek
43	MF	POL	Antoni Kozubal
44	MF	POL	Tymoteusz Gmur
53	MF	POL	Sammy Dudek
55	DF	POL	Maksymilian Pingot
56	MF	POL	Kornel Lisman
77	FW	ESP	Mario González (on loan from (United States) Los Angeles FC)
90	DF	POL	Wojciech Mońka

=== Out on loan ===
Note: Flags indicate national team as defined under FIFA eligibility rules; some limited exceptions apply. Players may hold more than one non-FIFA nationality.

No.	Pos.	Nation	Player
5	DF	SWE	Elias Andersson (at (Denmark) Viborg until 30 June 2025)
17	FW	POL	Filip Szymczak (at GKS Katowice until 30 June 2025)
20	DF	USA	Ian Hoffmann (at (Norway) Kristiansund until 30 June 2025)
28	DF	POL	Filip Borowski (at Ruch Chorzów until 30 June 2025)
74	MF	POL	Jakub Antczak (at Chrobry Głogów until 30 June 2025)

No.	Pos.	Nation	Player
—	MF	POL	Bartłomiej Barański (at Ruch Chorzów until 30 June 2025)
—	GK	POL	Krzysztof Bąkowski (at Stal Rzeszów until 30 June 2025)
—	GK	POL	Mateusz Pruchniewski (at Pogoń Siedlce until 30 June 2025)
—	DF	POL	Bartosz Tomaszewski (at Polonia Bytom until 30 June 2025)

== Transfer ==
=== Summer transfer window ===
==== In ====
No.	Pos.	Nat.	Name	Age	EU	Moving from	Type	Transfer window	Ends	Transfer fee	Source
74	MF	(Poland)	Jakub Antczak	20	EU	Odra Opole	Loan return	Summer	2027	Free	
	GK	(Poland)	Krzysztof Bąkowski	21	EU	Polonia Warsaw	Loan return	Summer	2026	Free	
28	DF	(Poland)	Filip Borowski	20	EU	Warta Poznań	Loan return	Summer	2025	Free	
30	MF	(Poland)	Igor Brzyski	17	EU		Transfer	Summer	2025	Youth system	
3	DF	(Sweden)	Alex Douglas	22	EU	(Sweden) Västerås SK	Transfer	Summer	2027	€350,000	
19	FW	(Norway)	Bryan Fiabema	21	EU	(Spain) Real Sociedad B	Transfer	Summer	2027	Free	
44	MF	(Poland)	Tymoteusz Gmur	16	EU		Transfer	Summer	Undisclosed	Youth system	
11	MF	(Finland)	Daniel Håkans	23	EU	(Norway) Vålerenga	Transfer	Summer	2028	€900,000	
20	DF	(Germany) (United States)	Ian Hoffmann	22	EU	(Norway) Moss	Transfer	Summer	2027	€200,000	
24	MF	(Poland)	Filip Jagiełło	27	EU	(Italy) Genoa	Transfer	Summer	2027	Free	
43	MF	(Poland)	Antoni Kozubal	19	EU	GKS Katowice	Loan return	Summer	2028	Free	
33	MF	(Bosnia and Herzegovina)	Stjepan Lončar	27	Non-EU	(Hungary) Ferencváros	Transfer	Summer	2025	Undisclosed	
90	DF	(Poland)	Wojciech Mońka	17	EU		Transfer	Summer	2027	Youth system	
55	DF	(Poland)	Maksymilian Pingot	21	EU	Stal Mielec	Loan return	Summer	2028	Free	
10	MF	(Sweden)	Patrik Wålemark	22	EU	(Netherlands) Feyenoord	Loan	Summer	2025	Free	
54	MF	(Poland)	Filip Wilak	20	EU	Ruch Chorzów	Loan return	Summer	2026	Free	

Total spending: ▼€1,450,000

==== Out ====
No.	Pos.	Nat.	Name	Age	EU	Moving to	Type	Transfer window	Transfer fee	Source
74	MF	(Poland)	Jakub Antczak	20	EU	GKS Katowice	Loan	Summer	Free	
31	GK	(Poland)	Krzysztof Bąkowski	21	EU	Stal Rzeszów	Loan	Summer	Free	
23	DF	(Slovenia)	Miha Blažič	31	EU	(United Arab Emirates) Kalba	Transfer	Summer	Undisclosed	
28	DF	(Poland)	Filip Borowski	20	EU	Ruch Chorzów	Loan	Summer	Free	
44	DF	(Poland)	Alan Czerwiński	31	EU	GKS Katowice	Transfer	Summer	Undisclosed	
3	DF	(Scotland)	Barry Douglas	34	Non-EU		End of contract	Summer	Free	
	MF	(Poland)	Maksymilian Dziuba	18	EU	GKS Tychy	Loan	Summer	Free	
6	MF	(Sweden)	Jesper Karlström	29	EU	(Italy) Udinese	Transfer	Summer	€2,000,000	
30	MF	(Georgia (country))	Nika Kvekveskiri	32	Non-EU		End of contract	Summer	Free	
10	MF	(Poland)	Filip Marchwiński	22	EU	(Italy) Lecce	Transfer	Summer	€3,000,000	
33	GK	(Poland)	Mateusz Pruchniewski	17	EU	Pogoń Siedlce	Loan	Summer	Free	
90	FW	(Poland)	Artur Sobiech	34	EU		End of contract	Summer	Free	
20	DF	(Poland)	Bartosz Tomaszewski	19	EU	Stal Stalowa Wola	Loan	Summer	Free	
11	MF	(Norway)	Kristoffer Velde	24	EU	(Greece) Olympiacos	Transfer	Summer	€4,000,000	

Total income: ▲€9,000,000

Total expenditure: ▲€7,550,000

=== Winter transfer window ===
==== In ====
No.	Pos.	Nat.	Name	Age	EU	Moving from	Type	Transfer window	Ends	Transfer fee	Source
74	MF	(Poland)	Jakub Antczak	20	EU	GKS Katowice	Loan return	Winter	2027	Free	
	MF	(Poland)	Bartłomiej Barański	18	EU	Ruch Chorzów	Transfer	Winter	2029	€23,000	
29	DF	(Denmark)	Rasmus Carstensen	24	EU	(Germany) 1. FC Köln	Loan	Winter	2025	Free	
53	MF	(Poland)	Sammy Dudek	16	EU		Transfer	Winter	2026	Youth system	
	MF	(Poland)	Maksymilian Dziuba	19	EU	GKS Tychy	Loan return	Winter	2026	Free	
77	FW	(Spain)	Mario González	28	EU	(United States) Los Angeles FC	Loan	Winter	2025	Free	
20	DF	(Poland)	Bartosz Tomaszewski	19	EU	Stal Stalowa Wola	Loan return	Winter		Free	
10	MF	(Sweden)	Patrik Wålemark	23	EU	(Netherlands) Feyenoord	Transfer	Winter	2029	€1,800,000	
23	MF	(Iceland)	Gísli Þórðarson	20	Non-EU	(Iceland) Víkingur Reykjavik	Transfer	Winter	2029	€500,000	

Total spending: ▼€2,323,000

==== Out ====
No.	Pos.	Nat.	Name	Age	EU	Moving to	Type	Transfer window	Transfer fee	Source
5	DF	(Sweden)	Elias Andersson	28	EU	(Denmark) Viborg	Loan	Winter	Free	
74	MF	(Poland)	Jakub Antczak	20	EU	Chrobry Głogów	Loan	Winter	Free	
	MF	(Poland)	Bartłomiej Barański	18	EU	Ruch Chorzów	Loan	Winter	Free	
30	MF	(Poland)	Igor Brzyski	17	EU	(Italy) Torino	Transfer	Winter	Undisclosed	
50	MF	(Ivory Coast)	Adriel Ba Loua	28	Non-EU	(France) Caen	Transfer	Winter	Free	
20	DF	(Germany) (United States)	Ian Hoffmann	23	EU	(Norway) Kristiansund	Loan	Winter	Free	
33	MF	(Bosnia and Herzegovina)	Stjepan Lončar	28	Non-EU	(Croatia) Istra 1961	Transfer	Winter	Undisclosed	
17	FW	(Poland)	Filip Szymczak	22	EU	GKS Katowice	Loan	Winter	Free	
20	DF	(Poland)	Bartosz Tomaszewski	19	EU	Polonia Bytom	Loan	Summer	Free	
10	MF	(Sweden)	Patrik Wålemark	23	EU	(Netherlands) Feyenoord	Loan return	Winter	Free	

Total income: €0

Total expenditure: ▼€2,323,000

== Friendlies ==
Win Draw Loss

29 June 2024 Club friendly	Lech Poznań	0–1	Piast Gliwice	Opalenica
18:00 CEST (UTC+02:00)		90minut Official website	Félix 76' (pen.)	Stadium: Hotel Remes Sport & Spa; Attendance: 0

3 July 2024 Club friendly	Lech Poznań	2–0	(Czech Republic) Baník Ostrava	Opalenica
16:00 CEST (UTC+02:00)	Antczak 50'; Ishak 71'	90minut Official website		Stadium: Hotel Remes Sport & Spa

6 July 2024 Club friendly	Lech Poznań	1–1	(Scotland) Dundee	Wronki
14:05 CEST (UTC+02:00)	Ishak 29'	90minut Official website	Palmer-Houlden 59'	Stadium: Amica Stadium

13 July 2024 Club friendly	Lech Poznań	5–0	Lechia Zielona Góra	Poznań
12:00 CEST (UTC+02:00)	Ba Loua 6', 78'; Szymczak 18', 30'; Gholizadeh 57'	90minut Official website		Stadium: Lech Poznań training ground Attendance: 0

13 July 2024 Club friendly	Lech Poznań	0–2	(Czech Republic) Teplice	Poznań
16:00 CEST (UTC+02:00)		90minut Official website	Horský 73'; Čerepkai 82'	Stadium: Lech Poznań training ground Attendance: 0

5 September 2024 Club friendly	Lech Poznań	3–1	Warta Poznań	Poznań
11:00 CEST (UTC+02:00)	Murawski 44' (pen.); Lisman 83'; Pleśnierowicz 90' (o.g.)	90minut Official website	Pawłowski 90'	Stadium: Lech Poznań training ground Attendance: 0

11 October 2024 Club friendly	Lech Poznań	4–3	Chrobry Głogów	Poznań
11:00 CEST (UTC+02:00)	Fiabema 16'; Ba Loua 56'; Wålemark 70'; Lončar 90'	90minut Official website	Szarek 59'; Szczutowski 74', 85'	Stadium: Lech Poznań training ground Attendance: 0

12 January 2025 Club friendly	Lech Poznań	1–3	(Croatia) Dinamo Zagreb	Kundu, Turkey
15:00 CET (UTC+01:00)	Gholizadeh 22'	90minut Official website	Baturina 20'; Hoxha 34'; Stojković 41'	Stadium: Mardan Spor Kompleksi

16 January 2025 Club friendly	Lech Poznań	0–0	(Bulgaria) Botev Plovdiv	Muratpaşa, Turkey
09:00 CET (UTC+01:00)		90minut Official website		Stadium: Nirvana Cosmopolitan Hotel; Referee: Tomasz Wajda (Żywiec)

16 January 2025 Club friendly	Lech Poznań	3–1	(Serbia) Čukarički	Kundu, Turkey
15:00 CET (UTC+01:00)	Ishak 28'; Lisman 60' (pen.); Gmur 76'	90minut Official website	Tufegdžić 20'	Stadium: Mardan Spor Kompleksi Kundu AST Arena; Referee: Paweł Malec (Łódź)

25 January 2025 Club friendly	Lech Poznań	1–7	(Denmark) Nordsjælland	Poznań
10:30 CET (UTC+01:00)	Lisman	90minut Official website	Svensson; Nene; Egeli; Nygren; Mohammed; Berthelsen	Stadium: Lech Poznań training ground Attendance: 0
Note: The match was played in a 3x45 minute format.

1 February 2025 Club friendly	Lech Poznań	0–0	Znicz Pruszków	Poznań
12:00 CET (UTC+01:00)		90minut Official website		Stadium: Lech Poznań training ground

== Competitions ==
Win Draw Loss

=== Overview ===
Competition	First match	Last match	Starting round	Final position	Record							
Competition	First match	Last match	Starting round	Final position	Pld	W	D	L	GF	GA	GD	Win %
Ekstraklasa	21 July 2024	24 May 2025	Matchday 1	1st	34	22	4	8	68	31	+37	64.71
Polish Cup	26 September 2024	26 September 2024	First round	First round	1	0	0	1	0	1	−1	0.00
Total					35	22	4	9	68	32	+36	62.86

Source: Competitions

=== Ekstraklasa ===
==== League table ====
Pos	Team	Pld	W	D	L	GF	GA	GD	Pts	Qualification or relegation
1	Lech Poznań (C)	34	22	4	8	68	31	+37	70	Qualification for Champions League second qualifying round
2	Raków Częstochowa	34	20	9	5	51	23	+28	69	Qualification for Conference League second qualifying round
3	Jagiellonia Białystok	34	17	10	7	56	42	+14	61	Qualification for Conference League second qualifying round
4	Pogoń Szczecin	34	17	7	10	59	40	+19	58	
5	Legia Warsaw	34	15	9	10	60	45	+15	54	Qualification for Europa League first qualifying round (Note: The 2024–25 Polish Cup winners (Legia Warsaw) qualify for the Europa League first qualifying round.)

Source: ekstraklasa.org 90minut.pl
Rules for classification: 1) Points; 2) Head-to-head points; 3) Head-to-head goal difference; 4) Goal difference; 5) Goals scored; 6) Number of wins; 7) Number of away wins; 8) Lower number of points based on yellow and red cards (red card = 3 points, yellow card = 1 point, sending-off = 3 points - including 1 point for first yellow card); 9) Fairplay ranking; 10) Draw.
(Note: Head-to-head record is used only after all the matches between the teams in question have been played)
(C) Champions

==== Results summary ====
Overall								Home						Away					
Pld	W	D	L	GF	GA	GD	Pts	W	D	L	GF	GA	GD	W	D	L	GF	GA	GD
34	22	4	8	68	31	+37	70	15	0	2	46	12	+34	7	4	6	22	19	+3

Source: Ekstraklasa 90minut.pl

==== Results by round ====
Round	1	2	3	4	5	6	7	8	9	10	11	12	13	14	15	16	17	18	19	20	21	22	23	24	25	26	27	28	29	30	31	32	33	34
Ground	H	A	H	A	A	H	A	H	H	A	H	A	H	A	H	H	A	A	H	A	H	H	A	H	A	A	H	A	H	A	H	A	A	H
Result	W	L	W	D	W	W	W	W	W	W	L	W	W	L	W	W	D	L	W	L	L	W	W	W	L	L	W	W	W	D	W	W	D	W
Position	3	7	4	4	3	1	1	1	1	1	1	1	1	1	1	1	1	1	1	1	1	1	1	1	3	3	2	2	2	2	2	1	1	1

Source: Ekstraklasa 90minut.pl
A = Away; H = Home; W = Win; D = Draw; L = Loss; P = Postponed

==== Matches ====
Win Draw Loss

21 July 2024 Match 1	Lech Poznań	2–0	Górnik Zabrze	Poznań
17:30 CEST (UTC+02:00)	Ishak 32' (pen.); Hotić 90+4'	Ekstraklasa; 90minut		Stadium: Enea Stadion; Attendance: 19,620; Referee: Damian Sylwestrzak (Wrocław)

27 July 2024 Match 2	Widzew Łódź	2–1	Lech Poznań	Łódź
20:15 CEST (UTC+02:00)	Sypek 3'; Álvarez 10'	Ekstraklasa; 90minut	Ishak 42'	Stadium: Stadion Miejski Widzewa; Attendance: 17,527; Referee: Szymon Marciniak (Płock)

3 August 2024 Match 3	Lech Poznań	3–1	Lechia Gdańsk	Poznań
20:15 CEST (UTC+02:00)	Ishak 3', 40'; Hotić 35'	Ekstraklasa; 90minut	Wendt 90+3'	Stadium: Enea Stadion; Attendance: 20,383; Referee: Marcin Szczerbowicz (Olsztyn)

9 August 2024 Match 4	Raków Częstochowa	0–0	Lech Poznań	Częstochowa
20:30 CEST (UTC+02:00)		Ekstraklasa; 90minut		Stadium: Raków Municipal Stadium; Attendance: 5,500; Referee: Szymon Marciniak (Płock)

17 August 2024 Match 5	Zagłębie Lubin	0–1	Lech Poznań	Lubin
17:30 CEST (UTC+02:00)		Ekstraklasa; 90minut	Sousa 19'	Stadium: Stadion Miejski; Attendance: 13,331; Referee: Paweł Malec (Łódź)

25 August 2024 Match 6	Lech Poznań	2–0	Pogoń Szczecin	Poznań
17:30 CEST (UTC+02:00)	Sousa 54'; Gholizadeh 77'	Ekstraklasa; 90minut		Stadium: Enea Stadion; Attendance: 29,156; Referee: Piotr Lasyk (Bytom)

30 August 2024 Match 7	Stal Mielec	0–2	Lech Poznań	Mielec
20:30 CEST (UTC+02:00)		Ekstraklasa; 90minut	Hotić 32'; Ishak 37'	Stadium: Stadion Miejski; Attendance: 6,477; Referee: Szymon Marciniak (Płock)

14 September 2024 Match 8	Lech Poznań	5–0	Jagiellonia Białystok	Poznań
20:15 CEST (UTC+02:00)	Sousa 25'; Hotić 41'; Szymczak 81' (pen.); Haliti 87' (o.g.); Jagiełło 90+3'	Ekstraklasa; 90minut		Stadium: Enea Stadion; Attendance: 32,365; Referee: Daniel Stefański (Bydgoszcz)

22 September 2024 Match 9	Lech Poznań	1–0	Śląsk Wrocław	Poznań
17:30 CEST (UTC+02:00)	Szymczak 68'	Ekstraklasa; 90minut		Stadium: Enea Stadion; Attendance: 34,285; Referee: Piotr Lasyk (Bytom)

29 September 2024 Match 10	Korona Kielce	2–3	Lech Poznań	Kielce
14:45 CEST (UTC+02:00)	Nuno 27', 57' (pen.)	Ekstraklasa; 90minut	Wålemark 14', 61', 63'	Stadium: Stadion Miejski; Attendance: 12,923; Referee: Piotr Lasyk (Bytom)

5 October 2024 Match 11	Lech Poznań	1–2	Motor Lublin	Poznań
20:15 CEST (UTC+02:00)	Ishak 24'	Ekstraklasa; 90minut	Mráz 25', 54'	Stadium: Enea Stadion; Attendance: 24,368; Referee: Łukasz Kuźma (Białystok)

19 October 2024 Match 12	Cracovia	0–2	Lech Poznań	Kraków
20:15 CEST (UTC+02:00)		Ekstraklasa; 90minut	Ishak 53'; Wålemark 57'	Stadium: Stadion Cracovii im. Józefa Piłsudskiego; Attendance: 13,449; Referee: Jarosław Przybył (Kluczbork)

26 October 2024 Match 13	Lech Poznań	2–1	Radomiak Radom	Poznań
20:15 CEST (UTC+02:00)	Pereira 17'; Ishak 72'	Ekstraklasa; 90minut	Ouattara 49'	Stadium: Enea Stadion; Attendance: 32,648; Referee: Wojciech Myć (Lublin)

2 November 2024 Match 14	Puszcza Niepołomice	2–0	Lech Poznań	Kraków
20:15 CET (UTC+01:00)	Szymonowicz 33'; Kosidis 44'	Ekstraklasa; 90minut		Stadium: Stadion Cracovii im. Józefa Piłsudskiego; Attendance: 2,266; Referee: Paweł Raczkowski (Warsaw)

10 November 2024 Match 15	Lech Poznań	5–2	Legia Warsaw	Poznań
17:30 CET (UTC+01:00)	Gholizadeh 5'; Kozubal 39'; Sousa 50', 69'; Ishak 59'	Ekstraklasa; 90minut	Gual 29'; Augustyniak 45+2' (pen.)	Stadium: Enea Stadion; Attendance: 40,838; Referee: Szymon Marciniak (Płock)

23 November 2024 Match 16	Lech Poznań	2–0	GKS Katowice	Poznań
17:30 CET (UTC+01:00)	Ishak 3'; Gholizadeh 57'	Ekstraklasa; 90minut		Stadium: Enea Stadion; Attendance: 28,254; Referee: Łukasz Kuźma (Białystok)

29 November 2024 Match 17	Piast Gliwice	0–0	Lech Poznań	Gliwice
20:30 CET (UTC+01:00)		Ekstraklasa; 90minut		Stadium: Stadion Miejski im. Piotra Wieczorka; Attendance: 5,324; Referee: Wojciech Myć (Lublin)

6 December 2024 Match 18	Górnik Zabrze	2–1	Lech Poznań	Zabrze
20:30 CET (UTC+01:00)	Zahović 4'; Lukoszek 14'	Ekstraklasa; 90minut	Sousa 13'	Stadium: Stadion im. Ernesta Pohla; Attendance: 21,059; Referee: Szymon Marciniak (Płock)

31 January 2025 Match 19	Lech Poznań	4–1	Widzew Łódź	Poznań
20:30 CET (UTC+01:00)	Sousa 5', 50'; Ishak 45+5', 80'	Ekstraklasa; 90minut	Kozlovský 52'	Stadium: Enea Stadion; Attendance: 30,542; Referee: Karol Arys (Szczecin)

9 February 2025 Match 20	Lechia Gdańsk	1–0	Lech Poznań	Gdańsk
17:30 CET (UTC+01:00)	Bobček 44'	Ekstraklasa; 90minut		Stadium: Polsat Plus Arena Gdańsk; Attendance: 13,869; Referee: Łukasz Kuźma (Białystok)

14 February 2025 Match 21	Lech Poznań	0–1	Raków Częstochowa	Poznań
20:30 CET (UTC+01:00)		Ekstraklasa; 90minut	Svárnas 45+1'	Stadium: Enea Stadion; Attendance: 28,247; Referee: Szymon Marciniak (Płock)

23 February 2025 Match 22	Lech Poznań	3–1	Zagłębie Lubin	Poznań
17:30 CET (UTC+01:00)	Wålemark 2', 18'; Carstensen 79'	Ekstraklasa; 90minut	Michalski 12'	Stadium: Enea Stadion; Attendance: 16,610; Referee: Piotr Lasyk (Bytom)

1 March 2025 Match 23	Pogoń Szczecin	0–3	Lech Poznań	Szczecin
17:30 CET (UTC+01:00)		Ekstraklasa; 90minut	Ishak 32', 68' (pen.); Pereira 85'	Stadium: Stadion Miejski im. Floriana Krygiera; Attendance: 20,562; Referee: Łukasz Kuźma (Białystok)

8 March 2025 Match 24	Lech Poznań	3–1	Stal Mielec	Poznań
20:15 CET (UTC+01:00)	Carstensen 21'; Håkans 22'; Sousa 58'	Ekstraklasa; 90minut	Dadok 41'	Stadium: Enea Stadion; Attendance: 23,281; Referee: Damian Sylwestrzak (Wrocław)

16 March 2025 Match 25	Jagiellonia Białystok	2–1	Lech Poznań	Białystok
20:15 CET (UTC+01:00)	Imaz 31'; Murawski 59' (o.g.)	Ekstraklasa; 90minut	Gholizadeh 9'	Stadium: Stadion Miejski; Attendance: 19,957; Referee: Daniel Stefański (Bydgoszcz)

29 March 2025 Match 26	Śląsk Wrocław	3–1	Lech Poznań	Wrocław
20:15 CEST (UTC+02:00)	Al-Hamlawi 11', 64'; Schwarz 90+4' (pen.)	Ekstraklasa; 90minut	Ishak 41' (pen.)	Stadium: Tarczyński Arena Wrocław; Attendance: 33,546; Referee: Piotr Lasyk (Bytom)

5 April 2025 Match 27	Lech Poznań	2–0	Korona Kielce	Poznań
20:15 CEST (UTC+02:00)	Gholizadeh 30'; Ishak 83'	Ekstraklasa; 90minut		Stadium: Enea Stadion; Attendance: 37,457; Referee: Karol Arys (Szczecin)

13 April 2025 Match 28	Motor Lublin	1–2	Lech Poznań	Lublin
17:30 CEST (UTC+02:00)	Król 69'	Ekstraklasa; 90minut	Wålemark 15'; Ishak 37'	Stadium: Arena Lublin; Attendance: 15,200; Referee: Yūsuke Araki (Japan)

21 April 2025 Match 29	Lech Poznań	2–1	Cracovia	Poznań
20:15 CEST (UTC+02:00)	Ishak 38'; Sousa 76'	Ekstraklasa; 90minut	Kakabadze 70'	Stadium: Enea Stadion; Attendance: 27,708; Referee: Szymon Marciniak (Płock)

27 April 2025 Match 30	Radomiak Radom	2–2	Lech Poznań	Radom
17:30 CEST (UTC+02:00)	Capita 79'; Tapsoba 90+1'	Ekstraklasa; 90minut	Ishak 5'; Jagiełło 34'	Stadium: Stadion im. Braci Czachorów; Attendance: 8,317; Referee: Piotr Lasyk (Bytom)

3 May 2025 Match 31	Lech Poznań	8–1	Puszcza Niepołomice	Poznań
20:15 CEST (UTC+02:00)	Gholizadeh 3', 14'; Ishak 16', 56'; Sousa 32', 35'; Lisman 64'; Hotić 82'	Ekstraklasa; 90minut	Atanasov 21'	Stadium: Enea Stadion; Attendance: 25,226; Referee: Karol Arys (Szczecin)

11 May 2025 Match 32	Legia Warsaw	0–1	Lech Poznań	Warsaw
17:30 CEST (UTC+02:00)		Ekstraklasa; 90minut	Gholizadeh 77'	Stadium: Stadion Wojska Polskiego; Attendance: 27,341; Referee: Wojciech Myć (Lublin)

18 May 2025 Match 33	GKS Katowice	2–2	Lech Poznań	Katowice
17:30 CEST (UTC+02:00)	Repka 14'; Nowak 59'	Ekstraklasa; 90minut	Wålemark 43'; González 76'	Stadium: GKS Katowice Stadium; Attendance: 14,325; Referee: Bartosz Frankowski (Toruń)

24 May 2025 Match 34	Lech Poznań	1–0	Piast Gliwice	Poznań
17:30 CEST (UTC+02:00)	Sousa 39'	Ekstraklasa; 90minut		Stadium: Enea Stadion; Attendance: 41,109; Referee: Szymon Marciniak (Płock)

=== Polish Cup ===
26 September 2024 First round	Resovia	1–0	Lech Poznań	Rzeszów
17:00 CEST (UTC+02:00)	Hebel 16'	Łączy nas piłka 90minut		Stadium: Stadion Miejski; Attendance: 3,656; Referee: Tomasz Kwiatkowski (Warsaw)

== Statistics ==
=== Appearances and goals ===
As of 24 May 2025.

No.	Pos	Player	Ekstraklasa		Polish Cup		Total	
No.	Pos	Player	Apps	Goals	Apps	Goals	Apps	Goals
Goalkeepers
31	GK	(Poland) Mateusz Mędrala	0	0	0	0	0	0
35	GK	(Poland) Filip Bednarek	0	0	1	0	1	0
41	GK	(Poland) Bartosz Mrozek	34	0	0	0	34	0
Defenders
2	DF	(Portugal) Joel Pereira	26+6	2	0+1	0	33	2
3	DF	(Sweden) Alex Douglas	21+2	0	1	0	24	0
15	DF	(Poland) Michał Gurgul	28+2	0	0+1	0	31	0
16	DF	(Croatia) Antonio Milić	30+1	0	1	0	32	0
18	DF	(Poland) Bartosz Salamon	14+3	0	0	0	17	0
25	DF	(Sweden) Filip Dagerstål	0	0	0	0	0	0
29	DF	(Denmark) Rasmus Carstensen	11+4	2	0	0	15	2
55	DF	(Poland) Maksymilian Pingot	1+6	0	1	0	8	0
90	DF	(Poland) Wojciech Mońka	5+4	0	0	0	9	0
Midfielders
7	MF	(Portugal) Afonso Sousa	30+1	13	0+1	0	32	13
8	MF	(Iran) Ali Gholizadeh	19+14	8	1	0	34	8
10	MF	(Sweden) Patrik Wålemark	16+6	8	0+1	0	23	8
11	MF	(Finland) Daniel Håkans	13+7	1	0	0	20	1
21	MF	(Bosnia and Herzegovina) Dino Hotić	12+15	5	0	0	27	5
22	MF	(Poland) Radosław Murawski	22+3	0	0+1	0	26	0
23	MF	(Iceland) Gísli Þórðarson	2+3	0	0	0	5	0
24	MF	(Poland) Filip Jagiełło	8+18	2	1	0	27	2
43	MF	(Poland) Antoni Kozubal	33+1	1	1	0	35	1
44	MF	(Poland) Tymoteusz Gmur	0	0	0	0	0	0
53	MF	(Poland) Sammy Dudek	0+2	0	0	0	2	0
56	MF	(Poland) Kornel Lisman	3+10	1	0	0	13	1
Forwards
9	FW	(Sweden) Mikael Ishak	32	21	0	0	32	21
19	FW	(Norway) Bryan Fiabema	2+26	0	1	0	29	0
77	FW	(Spain) Mario González	0+6	1	0	0	6	1
Players who appeared for Lech and left the club during the season:
5	DF	(Sweden) Elias Andersson	1+3	0	0	0	4	0
6	MF	(Sweden) Jesper Karlström	2	0	0	0	2	0
11	MF	(Norway) Kristoffer Velde	1	0	0	0	1	0
17	FW	(Poland) Filip Szymczak	3+12	2	1	0	16	2
20	DF	(United States) Ian Hoffmann	0+2	0	1	0	3	0
33	MF	(Bosnia and Herzegovina) Stjepan Lončar	0+2	0	1	0	3	0
50	MF	(Ivory Coast) Adriel Ba Loua	5+2	0	0	0	7	0

=== Goalscorers ===
As of 24 May 2025.

Place	Number	Position	Nation	Name	Ekstraklasa	Polish Cup	Total
1	9	FW	(Sweden)	Mikael Ishak	21	0	21
2	7	MF	(Portugal)	Afonso Sousa	13	0	13
3	8	MF	(Iran)	Ali Gholizadeh	8	0	8
3	10	MF	(Sweden)	Patrik Wålemark	8	0	8
5	21	MF	(Bosnia and Herzegovina)	Dino Hotić	5	0	5
6	2	DF	(Portugal)	Joel Pereira	2	0	2
6	17	FW	(Poland)	Filip Szymczak	2	0	2
6	24	MF	(Poland)	Filip Jagiełło	2	0	2
6	29	DF	(Denmark)	Rasmus Carstensen	2	0	2
10	11	MF	(Finland)	Daniel Håkans	1	0	1
10	43	MF	(Poland)	Antoni Kozubal	1	0	1
10	56	MF	(Poland)	Kornel Lisman	1	0	1
10	77	FW	(Spain)	Mario González	1	0	1
10	Own goal				1	0	1
TOTALS					68	0	68

=== Assists ===
As of 24 May 2025.

Place	Number	Position	Nation	Name	Ekstraklasa	Polish Cup	Total
1	2	DF	(Portugal)	Joel Pereira	7	0	7
1	8	MF	(Iran)	Ali Gholizadeh	7	0	7
3	11	MF	(Finland)	Daniel Håkans	6	0	6
4	7	MF	(Portugal)	Afonso Sousa	5	0	5
4	9	FW	(Sweden)	Mikael Ishak	5	0	5
4	43	MF	(Poland)	Antoni Kozubal	5	0	5
7	10	MF	(Sweden)	Patrik Wålemark	3	0	3
7	16	DF	(Croatia)	Antonio Milić	3	0	3
9	24	MF	(Poland)	Filip Jagiełło	2	0	2
10	18	DF	(Poland)	Bartosz Salamon	1	0	1
10	19	FW	(Norway)	Bryan Fiabema	1	0	1
10	21	MF	(Bosnia and Herzegovina)	Dino Hotić	1	0	1
10	22	MF	(Poland)	Radosław Murawski	1	0	1
10	23	MF	(Iceland)	Gísli Þórðarson	1	0	1
10	29	DF	(Denmark)	Rasmus Carstensen	1	0	1
10	50	MF	(Ivory Coast)	Adriel Ba Loua	1	0	1
10	90	DF	(Poland)	Wojciech Mońka	1	0	1
TOTALS					51	0	51

=== Clean sheets ===
As of 24 May 2025.

Place	Number	Nation	Name	Ekstraklasa	Polish Cup	Total
1	41	(Poland)	Bartosz Mrozek	13	0	13
2	35	(Poland)	Filip Bednarek	0	0	0
TOTALS				13	0	13

=== Disciplinary record ===
As of 24 May 2025.

Number	Position	Nation	Name	Ekstraklasa			Polish Cup			Total		
Number	Position	Nation	Name	Booked	(yellow card) (yellow-red card)	Sent off (straight red)	Booked	(yellow card) (yellow-red card)	Sent off (straight red)	Booked	(yellow card) (yellow-red card)	Sent off (straight red)
2	DF	(Portugal)	Joel Pereira	3	0	0	0	0	0	3	0	0
3	DF	(Sweden)	Alex Douglas	1	1	0	0	0	0	1	1	0
7	MF	(Portugal)	Afonso Sousa	4	0	0	1	0	0	5	0	0
8	MF	(Iran)	Ali Gholizadeh	3	0	0	0	0	0	3	0	0
9	FW	(Sweden)	Mikael Ishak	1	0	0	–			1	0	0
10	MF	(Sweden)	Patrik Wålemark	4	0	0	0	0	0	4	0	0
11	MF	(Finland)	Daniel Håkans	1	0	0	–			1	0	0
15	DF	(Poland)	Michał Gurgul	3	0	1	1	0	0	4	0	1
16	DF	(Croatia)	Antonio Milić	7	0	0	0	0	0	7	0	0
18	DF	(Poland)	Bartosz Salamon	3	0	0	–			3	0	0
19	FW	(Norway)	Bryan Fiabema	2	0	0	0	0	0	2	0	0
21	MF	(Bosnia and Herzegovina)	Dino Hotić	2	0	0	–			2	0	0
22	MF	(Poland)	Radosław Murawski	9	0	0	0	0	0	9	0	0
23	MF	(Iceland)	Gísli Þórðarson	0	0	0	–			0	0	0
24	MF	(Poland)	Filip Jagiełło	1	0	0	1	0	0	2	0	0
25	DF	(Sweden)	Filip Dagerstål	–						0	0	0
29	DF	(Denmark)	Rasmus Carstensen	1	0	0	–			1	0	0
31	GK	(Poland)	Mateusz Mędrala	–						0	0	0
35	GK	(Poland)	Filip Bednarek	–			0	0	0	0	0	0
41	GK	(Poland)	Bartosz Mrozek	0	0	0	–			0	0	0
43	MF	(Poland)	Antoni Kozubal	3	0	0	0	0	0	3	0	0
44	MF	(Poland)	Tymoteusz Gmur	–						0	0	0
53	MF	(Poland)	Sammy Dudek	0	0	0	–			0	0	0
55	DF	(Poland)	Maksymilian Pingot	1	0	0	1	0	0	2	0	0
56	MF	(Poland)	Kornel Lisman	0	0	0	–			0	0	0
77	FW	(Spain)	Mario González	0	0	0	–			0	0	0
90	DF	(Poland)	Wojciech Mońka	1	0	0	–			1	0	0
Players who appeared for Lech and left the club during the season:
5	DF	(Sweden)	Elias Andersson	0	0	0	–			0	0	0
6	MF	(Sweden)	Jesper Karlström	0	0	0	–			0	0	0
11	MF	(Norway)	Kristoffer Velde	0	0	0	–			0	0	0
17	FW	(Poland)	Filip Szymczak	0	0	0	0	0	0	0	0	0
20	DF	(United States)	Ian Hoffmann	0	0	0	0	0	0	0	0	0
33	MF	(Bosnia and Herzegovina)	Stjepan Lončar	0	0	0	0	0	0	0	0	0
50	MF	(Ivory Coast)	Adriel Ba Loua	1	0	0	–			1	0	0
TOTALS				51	1	1	4	0	0	55	1	1

=== Home attendances ===
As of 24 May 2025.

	Matches	Total attendances	Average attendance	Highest attendance	Lowest attendance
Ekstraklasa	17	492,097	28,947	41,109	16,610
Polish Cup	0	0	0	0	0
Total	17	492,097	28,947	41,109	16,610
