= Arkadiusz Bilski =

Polish footballer

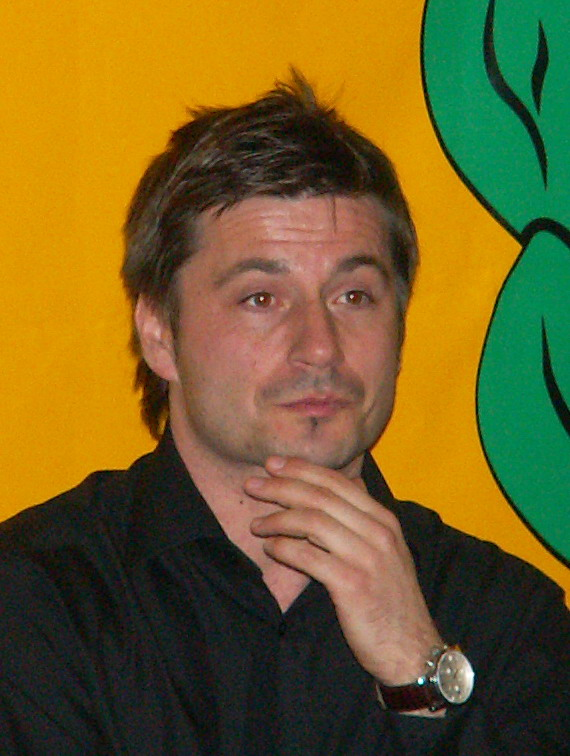
- Arkadiusz Bilski

Personal information
- Date of birth: 15 February 1973 (age 53)
- Place of birth: Skarżysko-Kamienna, Poland
- Height: 1.74 m (5 ft 9 in)
- Position: Midfielder

Team information
- Current team: Arka Pawłów (manager)

Senior career*
Years	Team	Apps	(Gls)
1989–1994	Granat Skarżysko-Kamienna		
1994–1995	Stal Stalowa Wola	29	(8)
1995–1997	GKS Katowice	37	(2)
1996–2001	KSZO Ostrowiec Świętokrzyski		
1999–2001	→ Ceramika Opoczno (loan)		
2002–2006	Korona Kielce		
2008–2009	GKS Rudki		

Managerial career
- 2006–2007: Korona Kielce II (assistant)
- 2007–2008: Korona Kielce (assistant)
- 2008–2009: GKS Rudki (player-manager)
- 2009–2011: Juventa Starachowice
- 2014: Łysica Bodzentyn
- 2015: Korona Kielce II
- 2015–2016: Korona Kielce II
- 2016–2017: Spartakus Daleszyce
- 2018–2021: Star Starachowice
- 2021–2024: Neptun Końskie
- 2025–: Arka Pawłów
- * Club domestic league appearances and goals

Arkadiusz Bilski (born 15 February 1973) is a Polish football manager and former player, currently in charge of Arka Pawłów. His previous teams include ZKS Granat Skarżysko, Stal Stalowa Wola, GKS Katowice, KSZO Ostrowiec, Ceramika Opoczno and Korona Kielce. His last team was GKS Rudki. He finished his career in the summer 2009.

== Managerial statistics ==
As of match played 16 November 2024

Managerial record by team and tenure
Team	From	To	Record							
Team	From	To	G	W	D	L	GF	GA	GD	Win %
GKS Rudki (player-manager)	July 2008	June 2009	32	10	6	16	31	45	−14	31.25
Juventa Starachowice	15 June 2009	26 May 2011	68	36	10	22	109	71	+38	52.94
Łysica Bodzentyn	1 July 2014	1 December 2014	20	8	6	6	25	20	+5	40.00
Korona Kielce II	1 January 2015	13 July 2015	17	7	3	7	24	32	−8	41.18
Korona Kielce II	6 October 2015	18 April 2016	15	9	3	3	30	15	+15	60.00
Spartakus Daleszyce	27 September 2016	11 December 2017	40	11	8	21	50	72	−22	27.50
Star Starachowice	11 December 2017	30 June 2021	107	64	13	30	259	156	+103	59.81
Neptun Końskie	16 July 2021	31 December 2024	124	55	23	46	207	176	+31	44.35
Arka Pawłów	1 January 2025	Present	0	0	0	0	0	0	+0	—
Total			423	200	72	151	735	587	+148	47.28

== Honours ==
=== Player ===
Korona Kielce

- II liga: 2004–05

=== Manager ===
Star Starachowice

- Regional league Świętokrzyskie: 2018–19
