= Sammy Dudek =

Polish footballer (born 2008)

Personal information
- Date of birth: 18 April 2008 (age 18)
- Place of birth: Baden-Baden, Germany
- Height: 1.75 m (5 ft 9 in)
- Position: Midfielder

Team information
- Current team: Unia Skierniewice (on loan from Lech Poznań)
- Number: 53

Youth career
- Diament Zduńska Wola
- 2016–2017: FCSM Kołobrzeg
- 2017–2018: Kotwica Kołobrzeg
- 2018–2019: Gwardia Koszalin
- 2019–2021: Bałtyk Koszalin
- 2021–2024: Lech Poznań

Senior career*
Years	Team	Apps	(Gls)
2024–	Lech Poznań II	32	(0)
2025–	Lech Poznań	3	(0)
2026–	→ Unia Skierniewice (loan)	11	(1)

International career^{‡}
2022–2023	Poland U15	10	(1)
2023–2024	Poland U16	5	(0)
2024–2025	Poland U17	13	(1)
2025–2026	Poland U18	8	(1)
2026–	Poland U19	3	(0)
- * Club domestic league appearances and goals as of 13:54, 10 November 2026 (UTC) ‡ National team caps and goals as of 21:17, 19 November 2026 (UTC)

Sammy Dudek (born 18 April 2008) is a professional footballer who plays as a midfielder for I liga club Unia Skierniewice, on loan from Lech Poznań. Born in Germany, he represents Poland at youth international level.

== Club career ==
=== Early career ===
Dudek began his youth career at Diament Zduńska Wola, before moving to FCSM Kołobrzeg in 2016. The following year, he joined Kotwica Kołobrzeg's youth setup for half-a-year. From 2018 to 2021, Dudek was part of two Koszalin-based clubs: Gwardia and Bałtyk, respectively.

In the summer of 2021, Dudek joined the youth academy of Lech Poznań. In his second season at the club, he won the Central Junior League under-19 title with Lech, and was part of the squad that competed in the 2023–24 UEFA Youth League.

=== Lech Poznań ===
On 12 June 2023, Dudek signed his first professional contract with Lech. He made his professional debut for Lech's reserve team on 15 April 2024, coming onto the pitch in the 84th minute of a 2–2 II liga draw against ŁKS Łódź II.

On 28 January 2025, Dudek was promoted to the first team. He made his first competitive appearance for Lech three days later, appearing as a late substitute in a 4–1 league win over Widzew Łódź. On 2 July 2025, Dudek extended his deal with Lech until the end of 2028.

He made a single appearance in the 2025–26 Ekstraklasa as Lech successfully defended the title.

=== Loan to Unia Skierniewice ===
On 8 July 2026, Dudek was sent on a season-long loan to I liga newcomers Unia Skierniewice.

== International career ==
Born in Baden-Baden, Germany to Polish parents, Dudek is eligible to represent Germany and Poland. He began his international career with the Poland under-15s, making his debut in a 3–0 win over Bosnia and Herzegovina on 12 September 2022. The following year, he was named captain of the under-15 team by coach Dariusz Gęsior.

After a few friendly appearances for the Poland U16 in 2023, Dudek received his first call-up to the under-17s the following year. Named captain again, he featured in all of Poland's games throughout their qualification campaign for the 2025 UEFA Euro Under-17.

On 3 September 2025, Dudek scored on his debut for the Poland under-18s in a 4–0 friendly win over the United Arab Emirates.

== Career statistics ==
As of match played 6 November 2026

Appearances and goals by club, season and competition
Club	Season	League			Polish Cup		Europe		Other		Total	
Club	Season	Division	Apps	Goals	Apps	Goals	Apps	Goals	Apps	Goals	Apps	Goals
Lech Poznań II	2023–24	II liga	2	0	—		—		—		2	0
Lech Poznań II	2024–25	III liga, gr. II	18	0	2	0	—		—		20	0
Lech Poznań II	2025–26	III liga, gr. II	12	0	—		—		—		12	0
Lech Poznań II	Total		32	0	2	0	—		—		34	0
Lech Poznań	2024–25	Ekstraklasa	2	0	—		—		—		2	0
Lech Poznań	2025–26	Ekstraklasa	1	0	1	0	0	0	0	0	2	0
Lech Poznań	Total		3	0	1	0	0	0	0	0	4	0
Unia Skierniewice (loan)	2026–27	I liga	11	1	1	0	—		—		12	1
Career total			46	1	4	0	0	0	0	0	50	1

== Honours ==
Lech Poznań

- Ekstraklasa: 2024–25, 2025–26
