= Kornel Lisman =

Polish footballer

Personal information
- Date of birth: 20 February 2006 (age 20)
- Place of birth: Szczecin, Poland
- Height: 1.86 m (6 ft 1 in)
- Position: Winger

Team information
- Current team: Venezia
- Number: 56

Youth career
- –2020: Pogoń Szczecin
- 2020–2023: FASE Szczecin

Senior career*
Years	Team	Apps	(Gls)
2023–2024	Lech Poznań II	29	(6)
2024–2026	Lech Poznań	26	(1)
2026–	Venezia	0	(0)

International career^{‡}
2023	Poland U18	3	(0)
2025	Poland U20	2	(0)
- * Club domestic league appearances and goals as of 18:32, 7 December 2025 (UTC) ‡ National team caps and goals as of 18:51, 13 October 2025 (UTC)

Kornel Lisman (born 20 February 2006) is a Polish professional footballer who plays as a winger for Serie A club Venezia.

== Club career ==
Born in Szczecin, Lisman began his career in 2015 in the youth ranks of hometown club Pogoń, before moving to FASE Szczecin in 2020, where he mainly played at the under-17 level of the Central Junior League.

On 22 June 2022, Lisman joined Lech Poznań II on a two-year deal, with an option for a further year. After impressing in his first few months in the third division, he was promoted to the senior team in February 2024, before having his season cut short by a knee injury the following month.

Lisman made his first professional appearance for Lech's senior team on 22 September 2024, playing the last 15 minutes of a 1–0 home league win over Śląsk Wrocław. On 3 May 2025, he scored his first goal for the club in a 8–0 league win over Puszcza Niepołomice. In his first full campaign with the first team, Lisman made 13 league appearances and scored once across a championship-winning season.

On 20 November 2025, Lisman extended his contract with Lech until 30 June 2028. He underwent knee surgery in early January 2026, and missed the remainder of the season that saw Lech defend their Ekstraklasa title.

On 27 June 2026, it was announced that Lisman would move to newly promoted Serie A club Venezia, with a contract running until at least June 2030, in a deal understood to be worth €2 million. Lisman's move came as Venezia returned to the top division for the 2026–27 season, after winning the Serie B title in the 2025–26 season.

== International career ==
Lisman has represented Poland at the under-18 level, earning three caps in 2023. He made his debut for the Poland U20s on 9 September 2025 as a starter in a 2–1 loss to Portugal.

== Career statistics ==
As of match played 18 December 2025

Appearances and goals by club, season and competition
Club	Season	League			Polish Cup		Europe		Other		Total	
Club	Season	Division	Apps	Goals	Apps	Goals	Apps	Goals	Apps	Goals	Apps	Goals
Lech Poznań II	2023–24	II liga	15	2	1	0	—		—		16	2
Lech Poznań II	2024–25	III liga, gr. II	12	4	1	0	—		—		13	4
Lech Poznań II	2025–26	III liga, gr. II	2	0	—		—		—		2	0
Lech Poznań II	Total		29	6	2	0	—		—		31	6
Lech Poznań	2024–25	Ekstraklasa	13	1	0	0	—		—		13	1
Lech Poznań	2025–26	Ekstraklasa	13	0	0	0	7 (Note: Two appearances in UEFA Champions League, two appearances and one goal in UEFA Europa League, three appearances in UEFA Conference League)	1	0	0	20	1
Lech Poznań	Total		26	1	0	0	7	1	0	0	33	2
Venezia	2026–27	Serie A	0	0	0	0	—		—		0	0
Career total			55	7	2	0	7	1	0	0	64	8

== Honours ==
Lech Poznań

- Ekstraklasa: 2024–25, 2025–26
