= Stadion Miejski (Starachowice) =

Polish stadium

- Stadion Miejski w Starachowicach
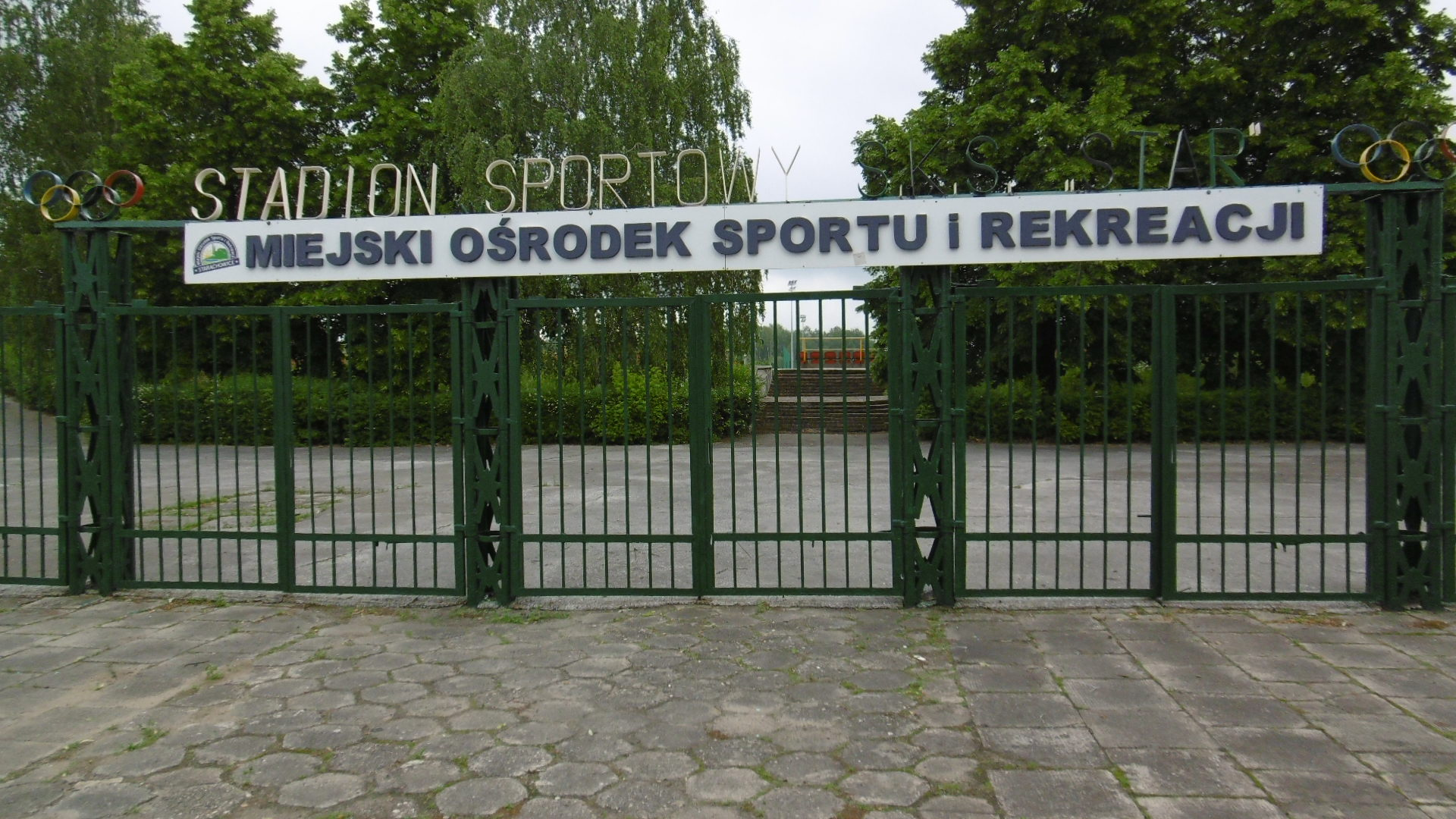
- Interactive map of Stadion Miejski
- Address: Szkolna 14 Street
- Location: Starachowice, Poland
- Coordinates: 51°3′39.7″N 21°4′11.28″E
- Capacity: 15,000
- Type: Stadium
- Event: Association football
- Surface: grass
- Current use: Association football

Construction
- Renovated: 1956–1961

Tenant
- Star Starachowice

The Starachowice Municipal Stadium (Stadion Miejski w Starachowicach) is a multi-use stadium in Starachowice, Poland.

== History ==
The stadium was constructed between 1956 and 1961 and has a seating capacity of up to 15,000 spectators. On 15 July 2001, to mark the 75th anniversary of the Star Starachowice club, a Polish Super Cup match was held at the stadium, with Wisła Kraków defeating Polonia Warsaw 4–3.

It also served as the home ground for Juventa Starachowice, which was dissolved in 2013.
