= Joel Pereira (footballer, born September 1996) =

Portuguese footballer

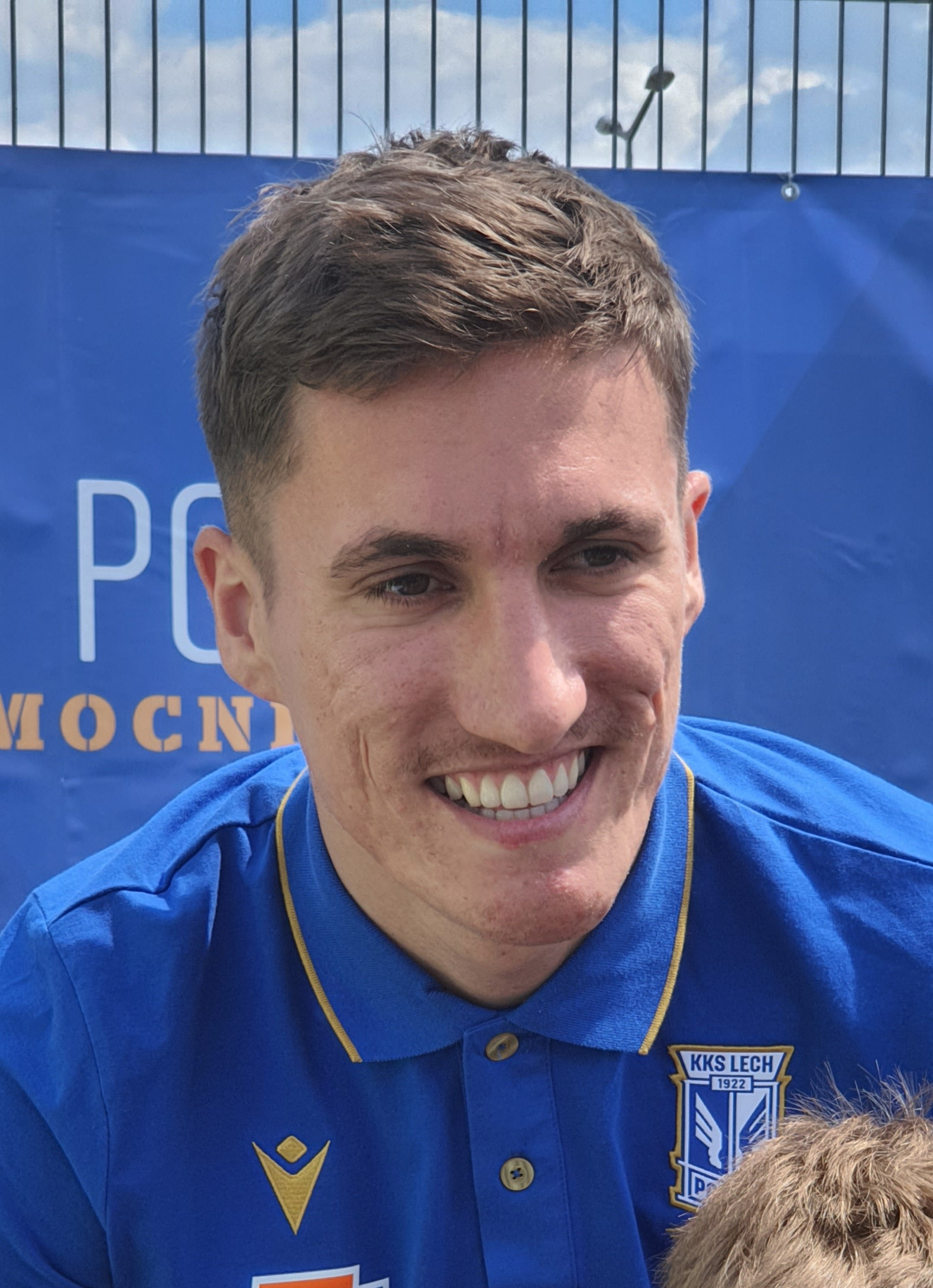
- Pereira in 2022

Personal information
- Full name: Joel Vieira Pereira
- Date of birth: 28 September 1996 (age 30)
- Place of birth: Perosinho, Portugal
- Height: 1.78 m (5 ft 10 in)
- Position: Right-back

Team information
- Current team: Lech Poznań
- Number: 2

Youth career
- 2004–2007: Perosinho
- 2007–2013: Porto
- 2011–2012: → Padroense (loan)
- 2013–2015: Vitória Guimarães

Senior career*
Years	Team	Apps	(Gls)
2015–2017	Vitória Guimarães B	20	(0)
2017–2018	Académico Viseu	34	(0)
2018–2019	Doxa Katokopia	30	(0)
2019–2021	Omonia Nicosia	1	(0)
2020	→ Spartak Trnava (loan)	3	(0)
2020–2021	→ Gil Vicente (loan)	32	(0)
2021–	Lech Poznań	167	(6)
2021	Lech Poznań II	2	(0)

International career
2011–2012	Portugal U16	7	(0)
- * Club domestic league appearances and goals as of 11:14, 16 November 2026 (UTC)

Joel Vieira Pereira (born 28 September 1996) is a Portuguese professional footballer who plays as a right-back for Ekstraklasa club Lech Poznań.

== Club career ==
Pereira was born in the village of Perosinho in Vila Nova de Gaia, Porto District. He played youth football for four clubs, including FC Porto from ages 11 to 17; he finished his development at Vitória de Guimarães.

On 16 September 2015, Pereira made his professional debut with Vitória's reserves in the LigaPro, featuring the full 90 minutes in a 0–0 home draw against Atlético Clube de Portugal. In the 2017 January transfer window he signed with fellow second-tier team Académico de Viseu FC, being voted the league's best right-back at the end of the 2017–18 season alongside FC Porto B's Diogo Dalot.

Subsequently, Pereira took his game to the Cypriot First Division, first with Doxa Katokopias FC then AC Omonia. On 31 January 2020, the latter club loaned him to Slovak Super Liga's FC Spartak Trnava on a six-month loan deal with an option to buy, being signed at the request of manager Ricardo Chéu and reuniting with his former Doxa teammate Bogdan Mitrea.

Pereira was loaned to Gil Vicente F.C. on 13 August 2020. He made his debut in the Portuguese Primeira Liga on 27 September, playing the entire 1–0 victory over Portimonense S.C. at the Estádio Cidade de Barcelos.

On 31 May 2021, Pereira signed a four-year contract with Polish club Lech Poznań. During his spell, he won three Ekstraklasa championships.

== Career statistics ==
As of match played 8 November 2026

Appearances and goals by club, season and competition
Club	Season	League			National cup (Note: Includes Taça de Portugal, Cypriot Cup, Polish Cup)		Continental		Other		Total	
Club	Season	Division	Apps	Goals	Apps	Goals	Apps	Goals	Apps	Goals	Apps	Goals
Vitória Guimarães B	2015–16	LigaPro	17	0	0	0	—		0	0	17	0
Vitória Guimarães B	2016–17	LigaPro	3	0	0	0	—		0	0	3	0
Vitória Guimarães B	Total		20	0	0	0	—		0	0	20	0
Académico Viseu	2016–17	LigaPro	6	0	0	0	—		0	0	6	0
Académico Viseu	2017–18	LigaPro	28	0	1	0	—		1	0	30	0
Académico Viseu	Total		34	0	1	0	—		0	0	36	0
Doxa	2018–19	Cypriot First Division	30	0	2	0	—		—		32	0
Omonia	2019–20	Cypriot First Division	1	0	2	0	—		—		3	0
Spartak Trnava (loan)	2019–20	Slovak Super Liga	3	0	—		—		—		3	0
Gil Vicente (loan)	2020–21	Primeira Liga	32	0	4	0	—		—		36	0
Lech Poznań	2021–22	Ekstraklasa	28	0	4	0	—		—		32	0
Lech Poznań	2022–23	Ekstraklasa	31	0	1	0	20 (Note: Two appearances in UEFA Champions League, eighteen appearances and one goal in UEFA Europa Conference League)	1	0	0	52	1
Lech Poznań	2023–24	Ekstraklasa	32	2	3	0	4 (Note: Appearances in UEFA Europa Conference League)	0	—		39	2
Lech Poznań	2024–25	Ekstraklasa	32	2	1	0	—		—		33	2
Lech Poznań	2025–26	Ekstraklasa	31	2	3	1	14 (Note: Four appearances and one goal in UEFA Champions League, ten appearances in UEFA Conference League)	1	1 (Note: Appearance in Polish Super Cup)	0	49	4
Lech Poznań	2026–27	Ekstraklasa	13	0	1	0	9 (Note: Two appearances in UEFA Champions League, seven appearances in UEFA Europa League)	0	1	0	24	0
Lech Poznań	Total		167	6	13	1	47	2	2	0	229	9
Lech Poznań II	2021–22	II liga	2	0	0	0	—		—		2	0
Career total			289	6	22	1	47	2	3	0	361	9

== Honours ==
Lech Poznań

- Ekstraklasa: 2021–22, 2024–25, 2025–26
- Polish Super Cup: 2026

Individual

- Ekstraklasa Goal of the Season: 2024–25
