= Filip Szymczak =

Polish footballer (born 2002)

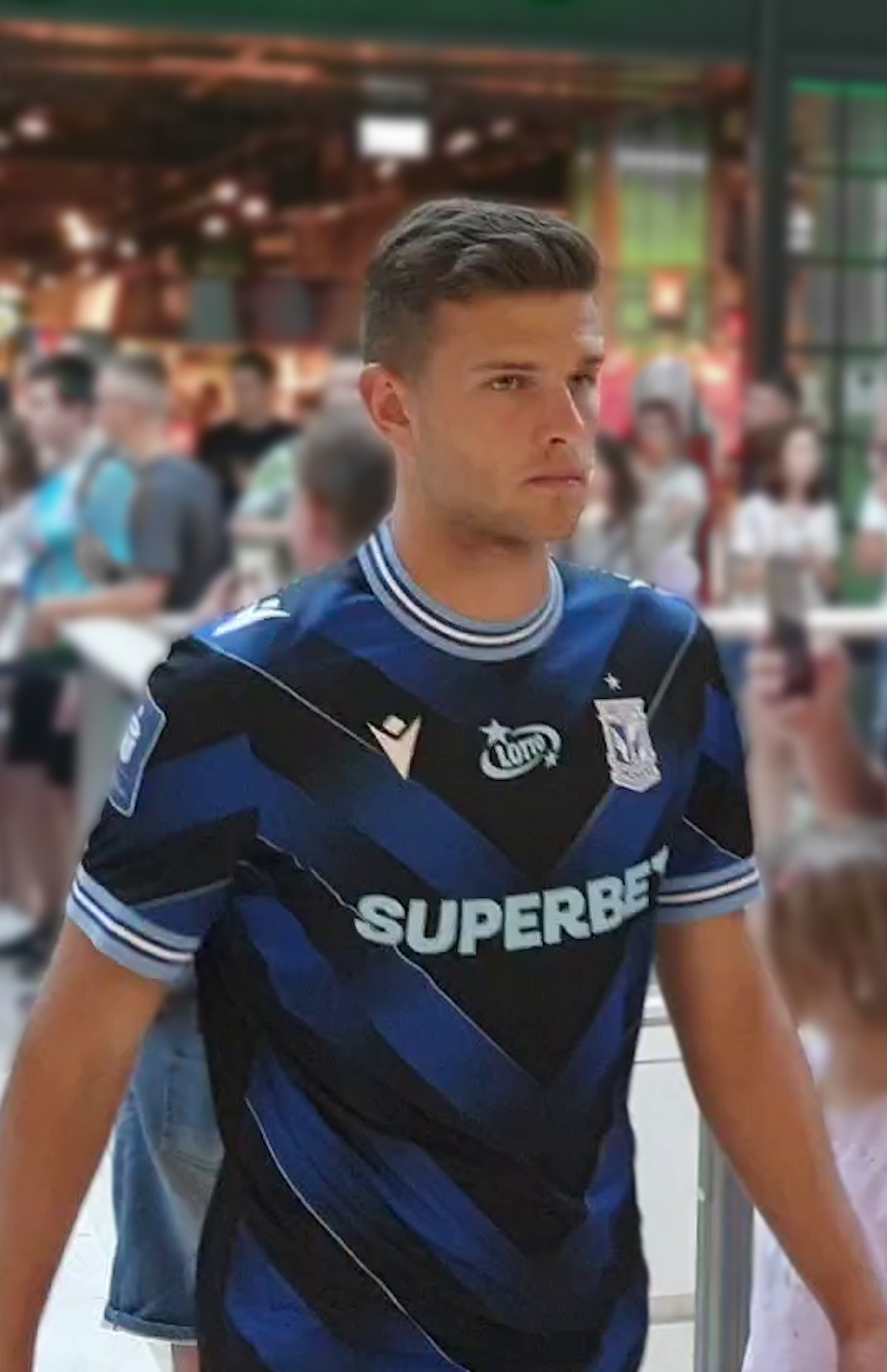
- Szymczak in 2023 with Lech Poznań

Personal information
- Full name: Filip Szymczak
- Date of birth: 6 May 2002 (age 24)
- Place of birth: Poznań, Poland
- Height: 1.84 m (6 ft 0 in)
- Position: Forward

Team information
- Current team: Zagłębie Lubin
- Number: 18

Youth career
- –2013: Warta Poznań
- 2013–2018: Lech Poznań

Senior career*
Years	Team	Apps	(Gls)
2018–2024	Lech Poznań II	41	(17)
2019–2026	Lech Poznań	85	(8)
2021–2022	→ GKS Katowice (loan)	32	(11)
2025	→ GKS Katowice (loan)	15	(3)
2025–2026	→ Charleroi (loan)	19	(0)
2026–	Zagłębie Lubin	0	(0)

International career
2018	Poland U16	2	(1)
2018	Poland U17	5	(1)
2020	Poland U19	1	(0)
2022	Poland U20	3	(0)
2021–2025	Poland U21	28	(8)
- * Club domestic league appearances and goals as of 20:36, 25 May 2026 (UTC)

Filip Szymczak (born 6 May 2002) is a Polish professional footballer who plays as a forward for Ekstraklasa club Zagłębie Lubin.

== Career statistics ==
As of match played 16 May 2026

Appearances and goals by club, season and competition
Club	Season	League			National cup (Note: Includes Polish Cup, Belgian Cup)		Europe		Other		Total	
Club	Season	Division	Apps	Goals	Apps	Goals	Apps	Goals	Apps	Goals	Apps	Goals
Lech Poznań II	2018–19	III liga, group II	6	1	—		—		—		6	1
Lech Poznań II	2019–20	II liga	25	12	—		—		—		25	12
Lech Poznań II	2020–21	II liga	7	4	0	0	—		—		7	4
Lech Poznań II	2022–23	II liga	1	0	0	0	—		—		1	0
Lech Poznań II	2023–24	II liga	1	0	0	0	—		—		1	0
Lech Poznań II	2024–25	III liga, group II	1	0	0	0	—		—		1	0
Lech Poznań II	Total		41	17	0	0	—		—		41	17
Lech Poznań	2019–20	Ekstraklasa	4	0	1	0	—		—		5	0
Lech Poznań	2020–21	Ekstraklasa	11	0	3	1	1 (Note: Appearances in UEFA Europa League)	1	—		15	2
Lech Poznań	2022–23	Ekstraklasa	21	2	0	0	17 (Note: Two appearances in UEFA Champions League, fifteen appearances and one goal in UEFA Europa Conference League)	1	1 (Note: Appearance in Polish Super Cup)	0	39	3
Lech Poznań	2023–24	Ekstraklasa	30	3	2	1	4 (Note: Appearances in UEFA Europa Conference League)	0	—		36	4
Lech Poznań	2024–25	Ekstraklasa	15	2	1	0	—		—		16	2
Lech Poznań	2025–26	Ekstraklasa	4	1	—		5 (Note: Four appearances in UEFA Champions League, one appearance in UEFA Europa League)	0	1	1	10	2
Lech Poznań	Total		85	8	7	2	27	2	2	1	121	13
GKS Katowice (loan)	2021–22	I liga	32	11	0	0	—		—		32	11
GKS Katowice (loan)	2024–25	Ekstraklasa	15	3	—		—		—		15	3
Charleroi (loan)	2025–26	Belgian Pro League	19	0	2	0	—		—		21	0
Zagłębie Lubin	2026–27	Ekstraklasa	0	0	0	0	—		—		0	0
Career total			192	39	9	2	27	2	2	1	230	44

== Honours ==
Lech Poznań

- Ekstraklasa: 2024–25

Lech Poznań II

- III liga, group II: 2018–19

Individual

- Ekstraklasa Young Player of the Month: November 2022, February 2024
