= Central Junior League (Poland) =

Centralna Liga Juniorów
- Organising body: PZPN
- Founded: 2013; 13 years ago
- Country: Poland
- Confederation: UEFA
- Number of clubs: 16 (U19); 32 (U17); 56 (U15)
- Level on pyramid: 1
- Relegation to: Macroregional league (U19); Voivodeiship league (U15 and U17)
- Current champions: U19: Legia Warsaw (6th title); U17: Legia Warsaw (2nd title); U15: Śląsk Wrocław (3rd title) (2025–26)
- Most championships: U19: Legia Warsaw (6 titles); U17: Legia Warsaw (2 titles); U15: Śląsk Wrocław (3 titles)

The Central Junior League (Polish language: Centralna Liga Juniorów, CLJ) is a Polish youth football competition. Created in mid-2013, it replaced Mloda Ekstraklasa as the highest level of youth football in Poland. Initially serving as the top tier for under-19 teams (replaced by under-18 teams from 2017 to 2022), it has since introduced under-17 and under-15 divisions. The winners of each level are crowned junior champions of Poland in their age group, with the under-19 champions advancing to the UEFA Youth League.

== History ==
First tournament of Polish U-19 championship took place in the summer of 1936, see Football Junior Championships of Poland. The formula of the U-19 games changed several times. In some years, there was a final match, taking place before an international game featuring the national team of Poland, while on other occasions, there was a final tournament, featuring four top U-19 teams, winners of local competitions. At regional level, the championships were organized by local branches of Polish Football Association (PZPN).

In the summer of 2007, the so-called Młoda Ekstraklasa (Young Ekstraklasa) was formed. It was contested by players 21 years of age and under, also each team was allowed three players over this age limit. Despite the creation of Młoda Ekstraklasa, games of the U-19 national championships continued on regional levels: winners of local competitions played each other in the play-off series.

=== 2013–14 ===
In the summer of 2013, the Central Junior League was officially formed by the PZPN. It consisted of four groups (48 teams), with 12 teams in each group (every Polish province was granted three spots). The championship took place in the autumn - spring system.

==== Group A ====
- Łódź Voivodeship: ŁKS Łódź, UKS SMS Łódź, GKS Bełchatów,
- Masovian Voivodeship: Legia Warsaw, Polonia Warsaw, Broń Radom,
- Podlasie Voivodeship: Jagiellonia Bialystok, ŁKS Łomża, MOSP Bialystok,
- Warmian-Masurian Voivodeship: Stomil Olsztyn, Sokół Ostróda, Olimpia Elbląg.

This group was won by GKS Bełchatów, second was Legia Warsaw. Both teams qualified to the playoffs.

==== Group B ====
- Kuyavian-Pomeranian Voivodeship: Zawisza Bydgoszcz, Elana Toruń, Lider Włocławek,
- Pomeranian Voivodeship: Arka Gdynia, Lechia Gdańsk, Bałtyk Gdynia,
- Greater Poland Voivodeship: Lech Poznań, Warta Poznań, Polonia Leszno,
- West Pomeranian Voivodeship: Bałtyk Koszalin, Pogoń Szczecin, AP Pogoń Szczecin.

This group was won by Lech Poznań, second was Pogoń Szczecin. Both teams qualified to the playoffs.

==== Group C ====
- Lower Silesian Voivodeship: Zagłębie Lubin, Śląsk Wrocław, Miedź Legnica,
- Lubusz Voivodeship: UKP Zielona Góra, Promień Żary, Polonia Slubice,
- Opole Voivodeship: Pomologia Prószków, MOSiR Opole, MKS Kluczbork,
- Silesian Voivodeship: Ruch Chorzów, Gwarek Zabrze, UKS Ruch Chorzów.

This group was won by Ruch Chorzów, second was Zagłębie Lubin. Both teams qualified to the playoffs.

==== Group D ====
- Lublin Voivodeship: Górnik Łęczna, Widok Lublin, Wisła Puławy,
- Lesser Poland Voivodeship: Cracovia, Wisła Kraków, Sandecja Nowy Sacz,
- Podkarpackie Voivodeship: Stal Stalowa Wola, Stal Rzeszów, Stal Mielec,
- Świętokrzyskie Voivodeship: Korona Kielce, KSZO Ostrowiec Świętokrzyski, Juventa Starachowice.

This group was won by Wisła Kraków, second was Cracovia. Both teams qualified to the playoffs.

==== Play-offs ====
- 5 June 2014: Zagłębie Lubin 0–2 Wisła Kraków, Cracovia 2–1 Ruch Chorzów, Legia Warsaw 2–2 Lech Poznań, Pogon Szczecin 2–1 GKS Bełchatów,
- 8 June 2014: Wisła Kraków 3–1 Zagłębie Lubin, Ruch Chorzów 0–2 Cracovia, Lech Poznań 3–0 Legia Warsaw, GKS Bełchatów 2–2 Pogoń Szczecin.

==== Semifinals ====
- 15 June 2014: Wisła Kraków 5–1 Lech Poznań, Cracovia 3–5 Pogoń Szczecin
- 19 June 2014: Lech Poznań 1–1 Wisła Kraków, Pogoń Szczecin 3–5 Cracovia (pen. 3–5).

==== Final ====
- 22 June 2014: Wisła Kraków 2–1 Cracovia
- 25 June 2014: Cracovia 0–10 Wisła Kraków.

Wisła Kraków became the 2014 U-19 Champion of Poland, and the first winner of the Central Junior League.

=== 2014–15 ===
In the second season of the CLJ, the league was limited to 32 teams, divided into two groups: West and East.

==== Group West ====
Sixteen teams from eight western provinces of Poland (Lower Silesia, Lubusz, Opole, Silesia, Kuyavia-Pomerania, Pomerania, Western Pomerania, Greater Poland):

- Lech Poznań, Pogoń Szczecin, Arka Gdynia, Lechia Gdańsk, Bałtyk Koszalin, Warta Poznań, Zawisza Bydgoszcz, Ruch Chorzów, Zagłębie Lubin, Śląsk Wrocław, MOSiR Odra Opole, UKP Zielona Góra, MKS Kluczbork, KS Stilon Gorzów Wielkopolski, Górnik Zabrze, Olimpia Grudziądz.

This group was won by Lech Poznań (70 points), second was Górnik Zabrze (63 points), third Lechia Gdańsk (61 points), and fourth Pogoń Szczecin (55 points). First two teams qualified to the playoffs. Relegated were the last four teams: Odra Opole (39 points), Olimpia Grudziądz (14 points), MKS Kluczbork (14 points), and Stilon Gorzów Wielkopolski (8 points).

==== Group East ====
Sixteen teams from eight eastern provinces of Poland (Łódź, Masovia, Podlasie, Warmia-Mazury, Lublin, Podkarpacie, Lesser Poland, Świętokrzyskie):

- GKS Bełchatów, Legia Warsaw, MKS Polonia Warsaw, Stomil Olsztyn, Jagiellonia Białystok, Olimpia Elbląg, ŁKS 1926 Łomża, ŁKS Łódź, Wisła Kraków, Cracovia, Korona Kielce, Stal Mielec, Wisła Puławy, Stal Rzeszów, KSZO Ostrowiec Swiętokrzyski, Motor Lublin.

This group was won by Legia Warsaw (79 points), second was Polonia Warsaw (60 points), third Cracovia (53 points), and fourth Jagiellonia Białystok (52 points). First two teams qualified to the playoffs. Relegated were the last four teams: Olimpia Elbląg (27 points), Stomil Olsztyn (25 points), ŁKS Łomża (24 points), and Wisła Pulawy (23 points).

==== Semifinals ====
- 6 June 2015: Górnik Zabrze 1–1 Legia Warsaw, Polonia Warsaw 1–0 Lech Poznań,
- 10 June 2015: Legia Warsaw 2–0 Górnik Zabrze, Lech Poznań 1–0 Polonia Warsaw (pen. 4–2)

==== Final ====
- 17 June 2015: Legia Warsaw 3–0 Lech Poznań
- 20 June 2015: Lech Poznań 2–3 Legia Warsaw

Legia Warsaw became the 2015 U-19 Champion of Poland.

=== 2015–16 ===
In the third season of the CLJ, the league had 32 teams, divided into two groups: West and East.

In Group West the teams that were relegated after the previous season (Odra Opole, Olimpia Grudziądz, MKS Kluczbork, Stilon Gorzów) were replaced by the four teams which won the playoffs:

- Gwarek Zabrze, which beat Gwardia Koszalin 7–1 and 13–0,
- FC Wrocław Academy, which beat Chemik Bydgoszcz 2–0 and 2–2,
- Pomologia Prószków, which beat Jarota Jarocin 5–0 and 3–2,
- Arka Nowa Sól, which beat Gryf Słupsk 4–3 and 5–1,

In Group East the teams that were relegated after the previous season (Olimpia Elbląg, Stomil Olsztyn, ŁKS Łomża and Wisła Puławy) were replaced by the four teams which won the playoffs:

- Hutnik Kraków, which beat Resovia Rzeszów 2–0 and 1–1,
- Płomień Ełk, which beat Granat Skarżysko-Kamienna 8–0 and 4–1,
- UKS SMS Łódź, which beat Orzeł Siemiatycze 4–0 and 4–0,
- TOP 54 Biała Podlaska, which beat Unia Warsaw 2–1 and 2–1.

== Champions ==
Season	Under-18/19	Under-17	Under-15
2013–14	Wisła Kraków	—	
2014–15	Legia Warsaw	—	
2015–16	Legia Warsaw	—	
2016–17	Legia Warsaw	—	
2017–18	Lech Poznań	Jagiellonia Białystok	Zagłębie Lubin
2018–19	Korona Kielce	Legia Warsaw	Legia Warsaw
2019–20	Górnik Zabrze	Season abandoned	
2020–21	Pogoń Szczecin	UKS SMS Łódź	Zagłębie Lubin
2021–22	Zagłębie Lubin	Zagłębie Lubin	Lech Poznań
2022–23	Lech Poznań	Górnik Zabrze	Śląsk Wrocław
2023–24	Legia Warsaw	Śląsk Wrocław	Śląsk Wrocław
2024–25	Legia Warsaw	Polonia Warsaw	Legia Warsaw
2025–26	Legia Warsaw	Legia Warsaw	Śląsk Wrocław

== Sources ==
- Central Junior League at PZPN's official page

== See also ==
- Ekstraklasa
- Football in Poland
- Polish Championship in Football
