= Alex Douglas (footballer, born 2001) =

Swedish footballer (born 2001)

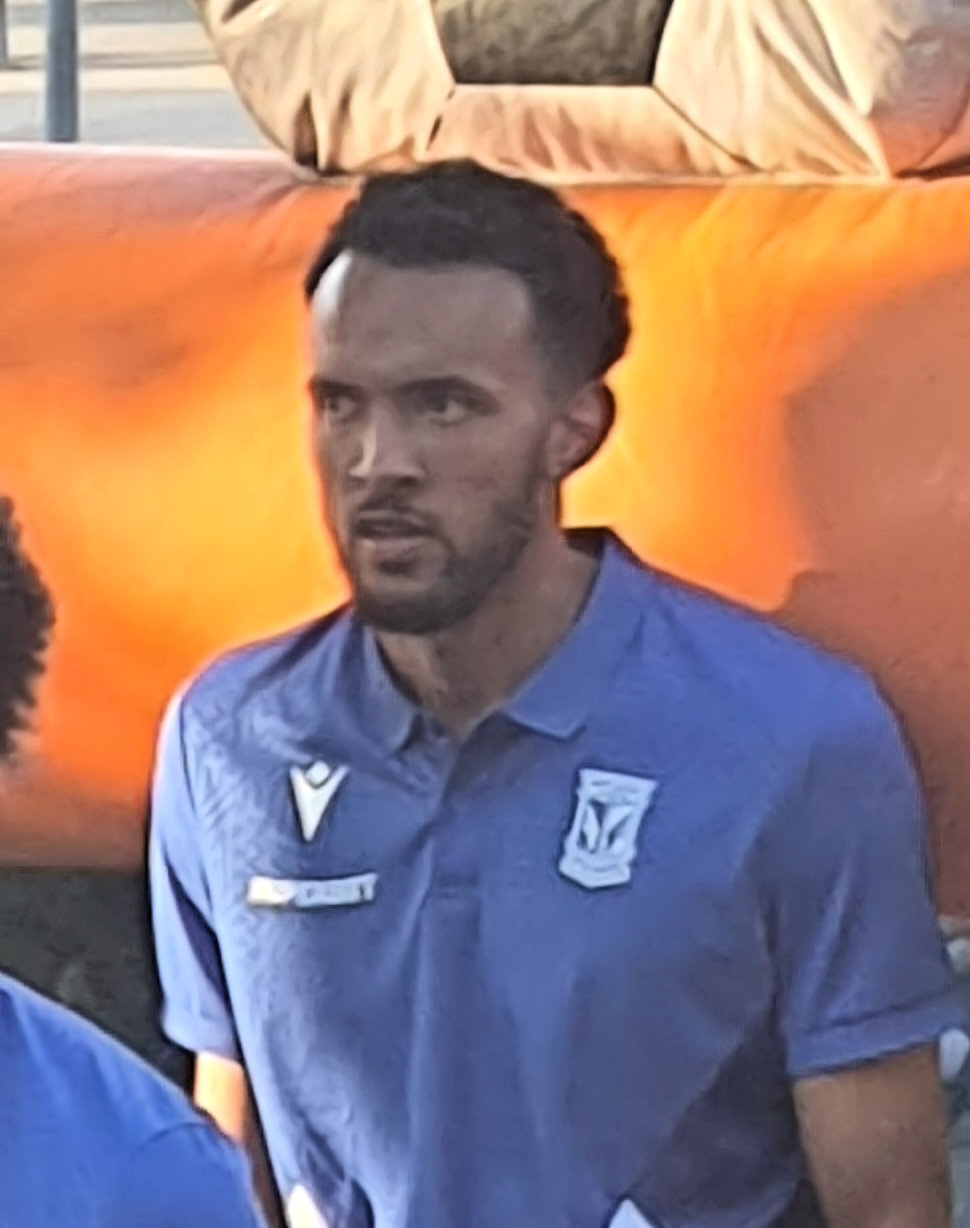
- Alex Douglas with Lech Poznań in 2024

Personal information
- Full name: Alex Raymond Douglas
- Date of birth: 17 August 2001 (age 25)
- Place of birth: Stockholm, Sweden
- Height: 1.90 m (6 ft 3 in)
- Position: Centre-back

Team information
- Current team: Lech Poznań
- Number: 3

Youth career
- 2014–2016: IF Brommapojkarna
- 2016–2019: Hammarby

Senior career*
Years	Team	Apps	(Gls)
2019–2020	San Roque de Lepe	2	(0)
2020–2021	FC Stockholm	10	(0)
2021–2022	Hammarby TFF	20	(0)
2022–2024	Västerås SK	61	(0)
2022	→ IFK Eskilstuna (loan)	3	(0)
2024–	Lech Poznań	30	(0)

International career^{‡}
2024	Sweden	4	(0)
- * Club domestic league appearances and goals as of 12:30, 11 November 2025 (UTC) ‡ National team caps and goals as of 12:35, 15 October 2024 (UTC)

Alex Raymond Douglas (born 17 August 2001) is a Swedish professional footballer who plays as a centre-back for Ekstraklasa club Lech Poznań.

== Club career ==
Douglas is a youth product of IF Brommapojkarna, and finished his development with Hammarby's youth academy at the age of 14. On 6 August 2019, he moved to the Spanish club San Roque de Lepe in the Tercera División. On 2 April 2020, he returned to Sweden with Stockholm in the Ettan division. The following season, he moved to Hammarby Talang FF, where he made 20 appearances. On 22 March 2022, he moved to Västerås SK in the Superettan on a 3-year contract. He spent his first season in 2022 on loan with IFK Eskilstuna, but returned in his second season to Västerås and helped them win the 2023 Superettan and earned promotion to the Allsvenskan.

On 10 July 2024, Douglas moved to Ekstraklasa club Lech Poznań.

== International career ==
Douglas was born in Sweden to a Ghanaian father and Swedish mother. He was called up to the senior Sweden national team for a set of UEFA Nations League matches in September 2024. He made his international debut in the starting line-up for a 1–3 away win over Azerbaijan on 5 September 2024.

== Career statistics ==
=== Club ===
As of match played 26 February 2026

Appearances and goals by club, season and competition
Club	Season	League			National cup (Note: Includes Svenska Cupen, Polish Cup)		Continental		Other		Total	
Club	Season	Division	Apps	Goals	Apps	Goals	Apps	Goals	Apps	Goals	Apps	Goals
San Roque de Lepe	2019–20	Tercera División	2	0	—		—		—		2	0
FC Stockholm	2020	Division 2	10	0	1	0	—		—		11	0
Hammarby FF	2021	Division 1	20	0	0	0	—		—		20	0
Västerås SK	2022	Superettan	20	0	4	0	—		—		24	0
Västerås SK	2023	Superettan	29	0	4	0	—		—		33	0
Västerås SK	2024	Allsvenskan	12	0	—		—		—		12	0
Västerås SK	Total		61	0	8	0	—		—		69	0
IFK Eskilstuna (loan)	2022	Division 2	3	0	—		—		—		3	0
Lech Poznań	2024–25	Ekstraklasa	23	0	1	0	—		—		24	0
Lech Poznań	2025–26	Ekstraklasa	7	0	1	0	6 (Note: Two appearances in UEFA Champions League, two appearances in UEFA Europa League, two appearances in UEFA Conference League)	0	1 (Note: Appearance in Polish Super Cup)	0	15	0
Lech Poznań	2026–27	Ekstraklasa	0	0	0	0	0	0	0	0	0	0
Lech Poznań	Total		30	0	2	0	6	0	1	0	39	0
Career total			126	0	10	0	6	0	1	0	143	0

=== International ===
As of match played 14 October 2024

Appearances and goals by national team and year
National team	Year	Apps	Goals
Sweden
Sweden	2024	4	0
Total		4	0

== Honours ==
Västerås SK

- Superettan: 2023

Lech Poznań

- Ekstraklasa: 2024–25, 2025–26
