= Granat Skarżysko-Kamienna =

Polish football club

- Full name: ZKS Granat Skarżysko-Kamienna
- Nickname(s): Tricolores
- Founded: 22 May 1928; 96 years ago
- Ground: Skarżysko Kamienna Municipal Stadium
- Capacity: 5,000
- Chairman: Grzegorz Żuk
- Manager: Bolesław Strzemiński
- League: IV liga Świętokrzyskie
- 2023–24: IV liga Świętokrzyskie, 13th of 18
- Website: http://www.zksgranat.info

Granat Skarżysko-Kamienna is a Polish football club, one of the oldest in the Świętokrzyskie Voivodeship.

The most notable player brought up in this club was Arkadiusz Bilski, who transferred to Korona Kielce. In the past, the stadium's capacity was 25,000, but modernisation reduced the capacity by 5000. Granat's most successful season was a second-place finish in the third division in the 1992–93 season.
