= Kundu, Aksu =

Kundu
- Neighbourhood
- Location in Turkey
- Coordinates: 36°52′27″N 30°54′39″E
- Country: Turkey
- Province: Antalya
- District: Aksu
- Population (2022): 2,006
- Time zone: UTC+3 (TRT)

Kundu (also: Özlü) is a neighbourhood of the municipality and district of Aksu, Antalya Province, Turkey. Its population is 2,006 (2022).
