= Antonio Milić =

Croatian footballer (born 1994)

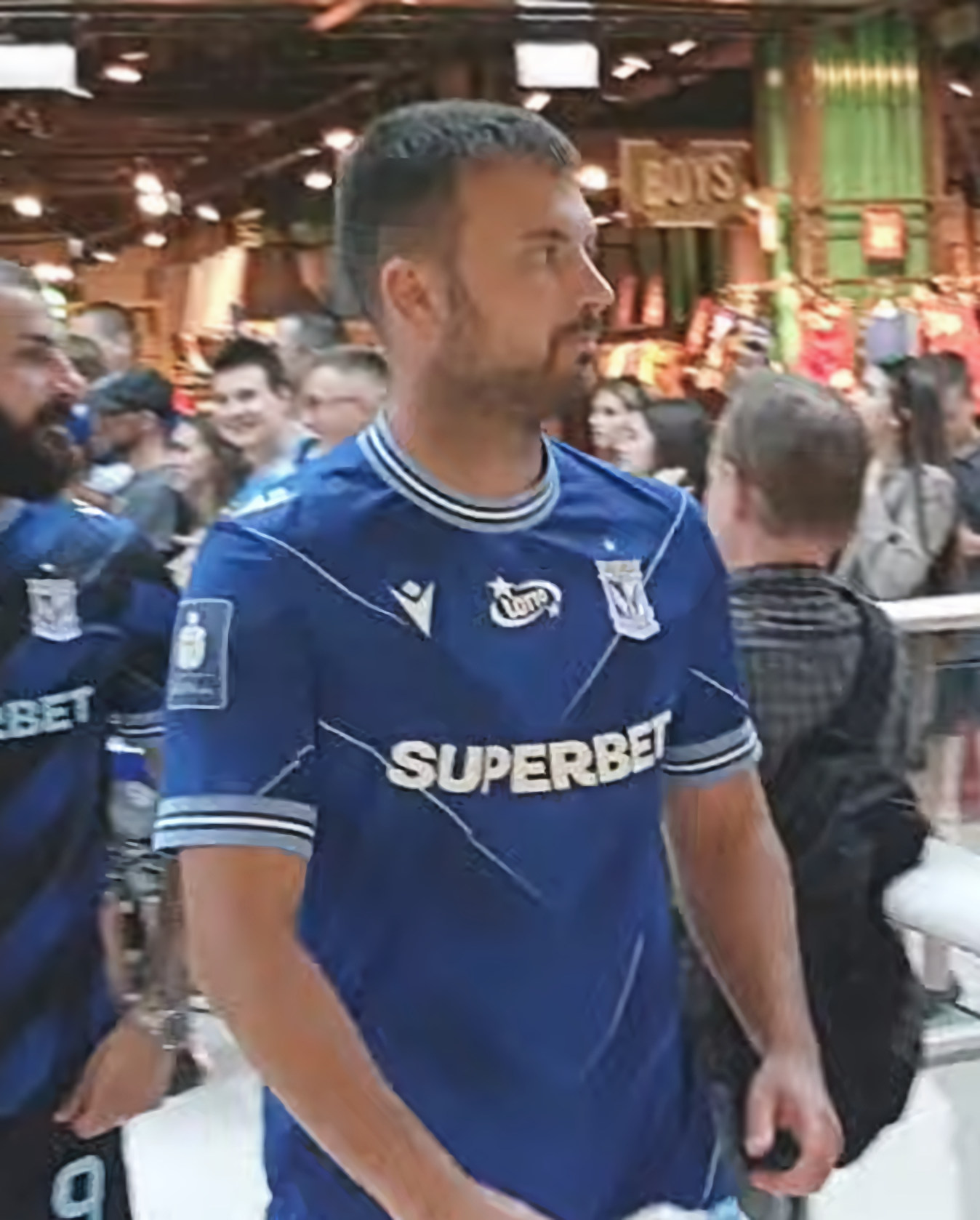
- Milić in 2023 with Lech Poznań

Personal information
- Date of birth: 10 March 1994 (age 32)
- Place of birth: Split, Croatia
- Height: 1.90 m (6 ft 3 in)
- Position: Centre-back

Team information
- Current team: Wieczysta Kraków
- Number: 16

Youth career
- 2002–2011: Hajduk Split

Senior career*
| Years | Team | Apps | (Gls) |
| 2011–2015 | Hajduk Split | 58 | (7) |
| 2015–2018 | Oostende | 101 | (9) |
| 2018–2020 | Anderlecht | 21 | (0) |
| 2019–2020 | → Rayo Vallecano (loan) | 18 | (0) |
| 2020–2026 | Lech Poznań | 139 | (8) |
| 2026– | Wieczysta Kraków | 8 | (1) |

International career
| 2009–2010 | Croatia U16 | 8 | (1) |
| 2010–2011 | Croatia U17 | 11 | (1) |
| 2013 | Croatia U19 | 1 | (0) |
| 2014–2015 | Croatia U21 | 18 | (3) |
| 2018 | Croatia | 3 | (0) |
- * Club domestic league appearances and goals as of 20 September 2026 (UTC)

Antonio Milić (Croatian pronunciation: [mǐlitɕ]; born 10 March 1994) is a Croatian professional footballer who plays as a centre-back for Ekstraklasa club Wieczysta Kraków.

== Club career ==
=== Hajduk Split ===
A product of Hajduk Split academy, Krasimir Balakov handed Milić his first team minutes in the Croatian Cup match against Jadran Gunja but his first league appearance came off the bench on 26 November 2011, in a 2–1 win over Šibenik, aged just 17 years, 8 months and 16 days. He made only one other league appearances that season, also off the bench, but he made another two Cup appearances against Zagreb also. After manager Balakov left Hajduk, new manager Mišo Krstičević came to the Hajduk bench. Since Krstičević managed the Hajduk U-19 team before he knew how to use Milić for the next season. In June 2012 Antonio won the Croatian U-19 championship.

In the 2012–13 Prva HNL, he started as a first team regular. The team's manager, Mišo Krstičević, made Milić a much more stable member of the first team, often playing in the holding midfield role, but also playing as either a central defender or a central midfielder. He played a significant role in defeating Inter Milan 2–0 on San Siro in the 2012–13 UEFA Europa League. He showed great talent while playing in the Prva HNL, and many people consider him on becoming the leading Croatian defender. Antonio Milić and Josip Radošević together created the best double pivot couple in Prva HNL. During Hajduk's winter preparations, he suffered an injury, which kept him off the pitch for nearly two months but he returned and helped his team to reach the 2012–13 Croatian Cup final by scoring the equalizer goal in the away match against Slaven Belupo on Poljud. In May 2013 Antonio signed a new contract with Hajduk that would keep him with the club until 2015. In May 2013 he won the Croatian Cup.

Under new manager Igor Tudor, Antonio's role in the team changed and was somewhat reduced. He was deployed either at left back or at center back and made 22 appearances in all competitions.

=== Oostende ===
On 20 December 2014, it was announced that Milić will join the Belgian club K.V. Oostende for a fee of 500 thousand euros.

=== Anderlecht ===
After a great three-year display at Oostende, Milić was about to join Anderlecht at the end of January 2018, but failed to sign with them as the transfer could not be completed due to the end of the transfer window. On 22 May 2018, it was announced that Milić has signed a three-year contract with Anderlecht, along with his teammate Knowledge Musona.

==== Rayo Vallecano (loan) ====
On 30 August 2019, Milić joined Spanish Segunda División side Rayo Vallecano on a one-year loan deal.

=== Lech Poznań ===
On 10 January 2021, Milić was transferred from Anderlecht to Polish side Lech Poznań. He scored his first goal for the club in a 2–0 Poznań derby win over Warta Poznań on 28 November 2021.

Shortly after joining, Milić established himself as a starter. He won three Ekstraklasa titles with Lech, in the 2021–22, 2024–25 and 2025–26 seasons. In total, he made 179 appearances and scored eleven goals across all competitions for the club. Milić left Lech at the end of his contract in June 2026.

=== Wieczysta Kraków ===
On 14 July 2026, Milić joined Ekstraklasa newcomers Wieczysta Kraków on a two-year contract, with an option for a further year.

== International career ==
He was called up to the senior Croatia squad for the first time for a World Cup qualifier against Ukraine in October 2017.

In August 2018 he was called up as a part of Croatia's UEFA Nations League squad for matches against Spain and England. On 6 September 2018, Milić earned his first cap for Croatia in an international friendly against Portugal.

== Career statistics ==
=== Club ===
As of match played 8 May 2026

Appearances and goals by club, season and competition
| Club | Season | League | | | National cup (Note: Includes Croatian Cup, Belgian Cup, Copa del Rey, Polish Cup) | | Continental | | Other | | Total | |
| Club | Season | Division | Apps | Goals | Apps | Goals | Apps | Goals | Apps | Goals | Apps | Goals |
|---|---|---|---|---|---|---|---|---|---|---|---|---|
| Hajduk Split | 2011–12 | Prva HNL | 2 | 0 | — | | — | | — | | 2 | 0 |
| Hajduk Split | 2012–13 | Prva HNL | 26 | 3 | 0 | 0 | 2 (Note: Appearances in UEFA Europa League) | 0 | — | | 28 | 3 |
| Hajduk Split | 2013–14 | Prva HNL | 18 | 2 | 2 | 0 | 2 | 0 | — | | 22 | 2 |
| Hajduk Split | 2014–15 | Prva HNL | 12 | 2 | 1 | 0 | 5 | 0 | — | | 18 | 2 |
| Hajduk Split | Total | | 58 | 7 | 3 | 0 | 9 | 0 | — | | 70 | 7 |
| Oestende | 2014–15 | Pro League | 5 | 1 | — | | — | | — | | 5 | 1 |
| Oestende | 2015–16 | Pro League | 33 | 2 | 1 | 0 | — | | — | | 34 | 2 |
| Oestende | 2016–17 | First Division A | 28 | 5 | 4 | 0 | — | | — | | 31 | 5 |
| Oestende | 2017–18 | First Division A | 35 | 1 | 3 | 0 | 2 | 0 | — | | 40 | 1 |
| Oestende | Total | | 101 | 9 | 7 | 0 | 2 | 0 | — | | 110 | 9 |
| Anderlecht | 2018–19 | First Division A | 21 | 0 | 0 | 0 | 4 | 0 | — | | 25 | 0 |
| Anderlecht | 2020–21 | First Division A | — | | — | | — | | — | | — | |
| Anderlecht | Total | | 21 | 0 | 0 | 0 | 4 | 0 | — | | 25 | 0 |
| Rayo Vallecano (loan) | 2019–20 | Segunda División | 18 | 0 | 2 | 0 | — | | — | | 20 | 0 |
| Lech Poznań | 2020–21 | Ekstraklasa | 9 | 0 | 2 | 0 | — | | — | | 11 | 0 |
| Lech Poznań | 2021–22 | Ekstraklasa | 26 | 4 | 2 | 0 | — | | — | | 28 | 4 |
| Lech Poznań | 2022–23 | Ekstraklasa | 23 | 1 | 1 | 0 | 16 (Note: Two appearances in UEFA Champions League, fourteen appearances and one goal in UEFA Europa Conference League) | 1 | 1 (Note: Appearance in Polish Super Cup) | 0 | 41 | 2 |
| Lech Poznań | 2023–24 | Ekstraklasa | 26 | 1 | 2 | 0 | 4 (Note: Appearances in UEFA Europa Conference League) | 1 | — | | 32 | 2 |
| Lech Poznań | 2024–25 | Ekstraklasa | 31 | 0 | 1 | 0 | — | | — | | 32 | 0 |
| Lech Poznań | 2025–26 | Ekstraklasa | 24 | 2 | 0 | 0 | 10 (Note: Three appearances and one goal in UEFA Champions League, one appearance in UEFA Europa League, six appearances in UEFA Conference League) | 1 | 1 | 0 | 35 | 3 |
| Lech Poznań | Total | | 139 | 8 | 8 | 0 | 30 | 3 | 2 | 0 | 179 | 11 |
| Wieczysta Kraków | 2026–27 | Ekstraklasa | 0 | 0 | 0 | 0 | — | | — | | 0 | 0 |
| Career total | | | 337 | 24 | 20 | 0 | 45 | 3 | 2 | 0 | 404 | 27 |

=== International ===
Appearances and goals by national team and year
| National team | Year | Apps | Goals |
|---|---|---|---|
| Croatia | 2018 | 3 | 0 |
| Total | | 3 | 0 |

== Honours ==
Hajduk Split

- Croatian U-19 championship: 2012
- Croatian Cup: 2012–13

Lech Poznań

- Ekstraklasa: 2021–22, 2024–25, 2025–26
