= Bartosz Salamon =

Polish footballer (born 1991)

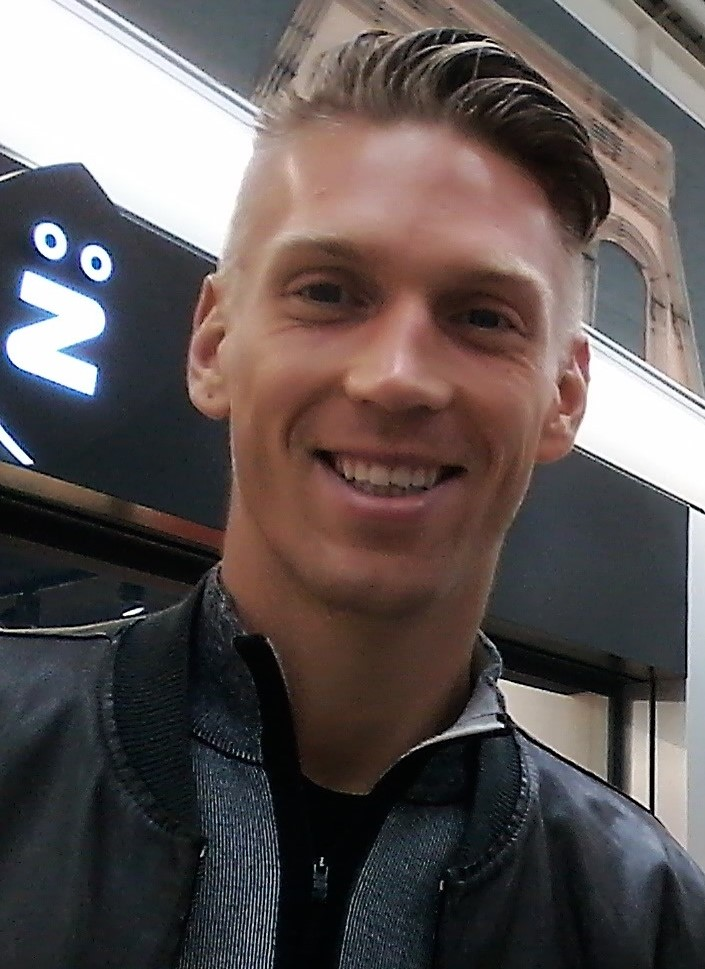
- Salamon with SPAL in 2017

Personal information
- Full name: Bartosz Salamon
- Date of birth: 1 May 1991 (age 35)
- Place of birth: Poznań, Poland
- Height: 1.94 m (6 ft 4 in)
- Position: Centre-back

Team information
- Current team: Albania (assistant coach)

Youth career
- 1999–2004: Concordia Murowana Goślina
- 2004–2007: Lech Poznań

Senior career*
Years	Team	Apps	(Gls)
2007–2012	Brescia	62	(4)
2010–2011	→ Foggia (loan)	27	(2)
2012–2013	Milan	0	(0)
2013–2015	Sampdoria	2	(0)
2014–2015	→ Pescara (loan)	36	(1)
2015–2018	Cagliari	48	(2)
2017–2018	→ SPAL (loan)	22	(0)
2018–2021	SPAL	20	(2)
2018–2019	→ Frosinone (loan)	20	(0)
2021–2025	Lech Poznań	80	(4)
2025–2026	Carrarese	1	(0)
Total		318	(15)

International career
2009–2010	Poland U19	4	(0)
2010–2011	Poland U20	1	(0)
2011–2012	Poland U21	1	(0)
2013–2024	Poland	15	(0)
- * Club domestic league appearances and goals

Bartosz Salamon (Polish pronunciation: [ˈbartɔʂ saˈlamɔn], born 1 May 1991) is a Polish former professional footballer who played as a centre-back. He is currently an assistant coach of the Albania national team.

== Club career ==
=== Early career ===
Salamon came through the academy of Polish side Lech Poznań after starting his footballing career at Concordia Murowana Goślina.

=== Brescia and loan to Foggia ===
Salamon made his Serie B debut on 3 May 2008 just two days after his 17th birthday, coming off the bench in the 77th minute of the win against Modena. On 17 January 2009, he appeared in Brescia's starting eleven for the first time, playing the full 90 minutes of the 4–0 win versus Pisa. On 9 August, he scored his first goal for Brescia in a 1–0 win over Ravenna in Coppa Italia.

In July 2010, it was announced he would play on loan at U.S. Foggia in Lega Pro Prima Divisione, the third tier of Italian football.

He returned to Brescia, in Serie B, for the 2011–12 season. In 2012–13, Brescia decided to play him mainly in central defense.

=== Milan ===
On 31 January 2013, Salamon joined Milan, signing a contract until 2017, for a fee of €3.5 million. He was given the number 14 shirt. However, he struggled to displace internationals Philippe Mexès, Cristián Zapata, Daniele Bonera and Mario Yepes in the pecking order.

=== Sampdoria ===
On 11 July 2013, Salamon was transferred to Sampdoria in a co-ownership deal for €1.6 million, as part of the deal that signing 50% registration rights of Andrea Poli for €3 million. The co-ownership deals were terminated on 9 June 2014, for an additional €4 million (Poli) and €1.6 million (Salamon) respectively. On 1 September 2014, Salamon joined Pescara in a temporary deal.

=== Cagliari ===
On 31 August 2015, Salamon was sold to Cagliari in a five-year contract for €1 million.

Hee made his debut on 7 September 2015, in a 4–0 win over Crotone and with time became a star performener for the club. In the 2015–16 season he won the Serie B title and was thus promoted to Serie A.

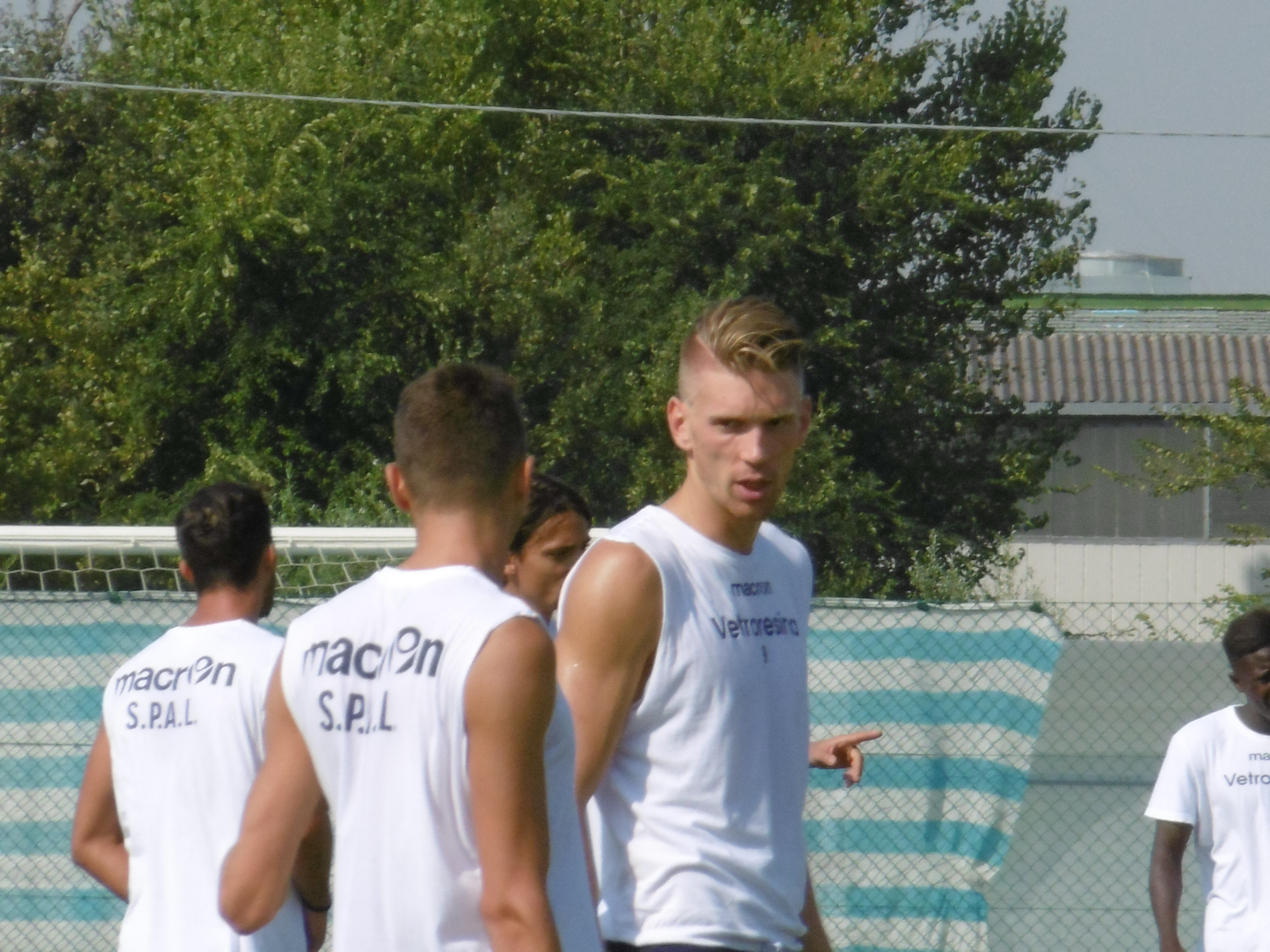
Salamon during training with SPAL

He was loaned to newly promoted S.P.A.L. 2013 at the beginning of the 2017-18 season. He made his debut for the club in a 3–2 win against Udinese.

=== Frosinone ===
On 9 August 2018, Salamon joined Serie A side Frosinone on loan until 30 June 2019 with an obligation to buy.

=== Lech Poznań ===
On 9 January 2021, Salamon signed a three-and-a-half-year contract with Polish Ekstraklasa side Lech Poznań. A product of their youth system, he returned to Poznań after nearly fourteen years.

In 2023, after Lech's match against Djurgårdens IF in the UEFA Europa Conference League, Salamon tested positive for chlortalidone, a substance banned by WADA. On 13 April 2023, hours before a home game in the quarter-finals against Fiorentina, UEFA suspended Salamon from all competitions for three months. For his offence, Salamon was banned for eight months, starting from the day of his suspension. He made his return on 16 December 2023, playing the full 90 minutes in a 2–2 away draw against Radomiak Radom. On 29 May 2024, Salamon extended his deal with the club for another two years.

After not being given any playing time at the start of the 2025–26 season, Salamon terminated his contract with Lech by mutual consent on 27 August 2025. In three-and-a-half years, he made 87 appearances for his hometown club, won two league titles and was part of the team that reached the UEFA Europa Conference League quarter-finals in 2023, Lech's best-ever result in any European competition.

=== Carrarese ===
Hours after leaving Lech, Salamon joined Serie B club Carrarese on a two-year deal. He made his debut, and sole official appearance, on 21 September 2025, playing 57 minutes in a 4–3 league loss to Avellino. Salamon and Carrarese mutually agreed to part ways on 21 August 2026.

== International career ==
Having represented Poland at youth levels ranging from U16 until U21, in September 2010, Salamon received his first call-up to the senior squad for friendly matches against the United States and Ecuador. He debuted on 26 March 2013 in a 2014 World Cup qualification against San Marino.

In March 2016, three years after his senior squad absence, he received a call-up from Poland manager Adam Nawałka for matches against Serbia and Finland. On 30 May, he was called up to Poland squad for UEFA Euro 2016, but was an unused substitute in all matches.

On 7 June 2024, Salamon was selected for his second international tournament, making Poland's squad for UEFA Euro 2024. He started in Poland's opening game, a 2–1 loss to the Netherlands, and remained benched for the rest of the tournament.

== Coaching career ==
In September 2026, Salamon joined the Albania national team's coaching staff as an assistant, focusing on defensive training.

== Career statistics ==
=== Club ===
Appearances and goals by club, season and competition
Club	Season	League			National cup (Note: Includes Polish Cup, Coppa Italia)		Europe		Total	
Club	Season	Division	Apps	Goals	Apps	Goals	Apps	Goals	Apps	Goals
Brescia	2007–08	Serie B	1	0	0	0	—		1	0
Brescia	2008–09	Serie B	11	0	0	0	—		11	0
Brescia	2009–10	Serie B	4	0	2	1	—		6	1
Brescia	2011–12	Serie B	25	1	0	0	—		25	1
Brescia	2012–13	Serie B	21	3	1	0	—		22	3
Brescia	Total		62	4	3	1	—		65	5
Foggia Calcio (loan)	2010–11	Prima Divisione	27	2	5	0	—		32	2
Milan	2012–13	Serie A	0	0	0	0	0	0	0	0
Sampdoria	2013–14	Serie A	2	0	1	0	—		3	0
Sampdoria	2014–15	Serie A	0	0	1	0	—		1	0
Sampdoria	Total		2	0	2	0	—		4	0
Pescara (loan)	2014–15	Serie B	36	1	1	0	—		37	1
Cagliari	2015–16	Serie B	33	2	1	0	—		34	2
Cagliari	2016–17	Serie A	15	0	2	0	—		17	0
Cagliari	Total		48	2	3	0	—		51	2
SPAL (loan)	2017–18	Serie A	22	0	0	0	—		22	0
SPAL	2019–20	Serie A	7	0	1	0	—		8	0
SPAL	2020–21	Serie B	13	2	1	0	—		14	2
SPAL	Total		20	2	2	0	—		22	2
Frosinone (loan)	2018–19	Serie A	20	0	1	0	—		21	0
Lech Poznań	2020–21	Ekstraklasa	13	1	1	0	—		14	1
Lech Poznań	2021–22	Ekstraklasa	25	3	1	0	—		26	3
Lech Poznań	2022–23	Ekstraklasa	10	0	0	0	4 (Note: Appearances in UEFA Europa Conference League)	0	14	0
Lech Poznań	2023–24	Ekstraklasa	15	0	1	0	0	0	16	0
Lech Poznań	2024–25	Ekstraklasa	17	0	0	0	—		17	0
Lech Poznań	Total		80	4	3	0	4	0	87	4
Carrarese	2025–26	Serie B	1	0	0	0	—		1	0
Career total			318	15	20	1	4	0	342	16

=== International ===
Appearances and goals by national team and year
National team	Year	Apps	Goals
Poland	2013	5	0
Poland	2016	4	0
Poland	2022	1	0
Poland	2023	1	0
Poland	2024	4	0
Total		15	0

== Honours ==
Cagliari

- Serie B: 2015–16

Lech Poznań

- Ekstraklasa: 2021–22, 2024–25

Individual

- Ekstraklasa Defender of the Season: 2021–22
