= Juventa Starachowice =

- Full name: Katolicki Klub Sportowy; Autonomiczna Sekcja Piłki Nożnej Juventa Starachowice
- Nickname(s): Juventa
- Founded: 1 September 1996; 28 years ago
- Dissolved: 2013; 12 years ago
- Ground: Municipal Stadium
- 2012–13: III liga, group D, 10th of 16
- Website: http://www.juventa.starachowice.org/glowna.php
Home colours	Away colours

Juventa Starachowice was a Polish football club in Starachowice, Świętokrzyskie Voivodeship. Juventa Starachowice played in the III liga. They played home games at the Municipal Stadium. Previous to the establishment of the football club in 1996, the amateur sporting organisation also had an interest in tennis and athletics.

== History ==
The club was founded on the initiative of a dozen supporters of sport and recreation and with the organisation and kindness of the Parish of Our Lady of Perpetual Help and the South Elementary School No. 13.

Since the beginning, the club set about shaping the attitudes and morals of the youth along with recreation and amateur sport. Initially, the club had a major interest in tennis and athletics, however, in 1996 it was decided that a football team would be established which would be coached by Krzysztof Zuba. Four years later (in 2000) sections in the club parted. Athletics remained in "Juventa-Marbo", while the players created the Katolicki Klub Sportowy Autonomiczna Sekcja Piłki Nożnej Juventa Starachowice.

At junior level the club had many successes, winning a number of tournaments however in 2005 it was decided to start a senior team which joined the Class A tournament under the name Juventa-Star. This team was financially supported by a committee of "100". In the first season, Juventa-Star won promotion to the class of the district, the top scorer of the A-Class won by local Konrad Tchurz.

Six months later, the club began performing under the name Juventa Starachowice, and after the season ended, the name was again changed to Juventa-Perfopol, due to sponsorship from Perfopol, a local metal sheet manufacturer. In the 2007–08 season, under the leadership of the first coach from "outside" Starachowice, the club won promotion to the fourth league.

Due to the reputation of then coach Arkadiusz Bilski, the club was able to sign many high-profile players including several with experience in a top-flight. In the first season in the third league, Juventa achieved seventh position in the table, and a year later took on a higher place.

With the end of the 2010–11 season, Perfopol withdrew their sponsorship of the club, which returned to its prior name Juventa. A few rounds before the end of the competition, Bilski resigned and was replaced by Marek Mierzwa who previously worked for Spartakus Daleszyce. In November 2011, Mierzwa was replaced by former coach of KSZO Ostrowiec Św., Rafał Wójcik.

Juventa finished the 2012–13 III liga season in 10th place. It was their last campaign at any level of the Polish league system; as of 2024, they have not entered a senior team into competition since.

== Honours ==
- IV liga Świętokrzyskie
  - Champions: 2008–09
- Regional league Świętokrzyskie II
  - Champions: 2007–08
