= Afonso Sousa =

Portuguese footballer

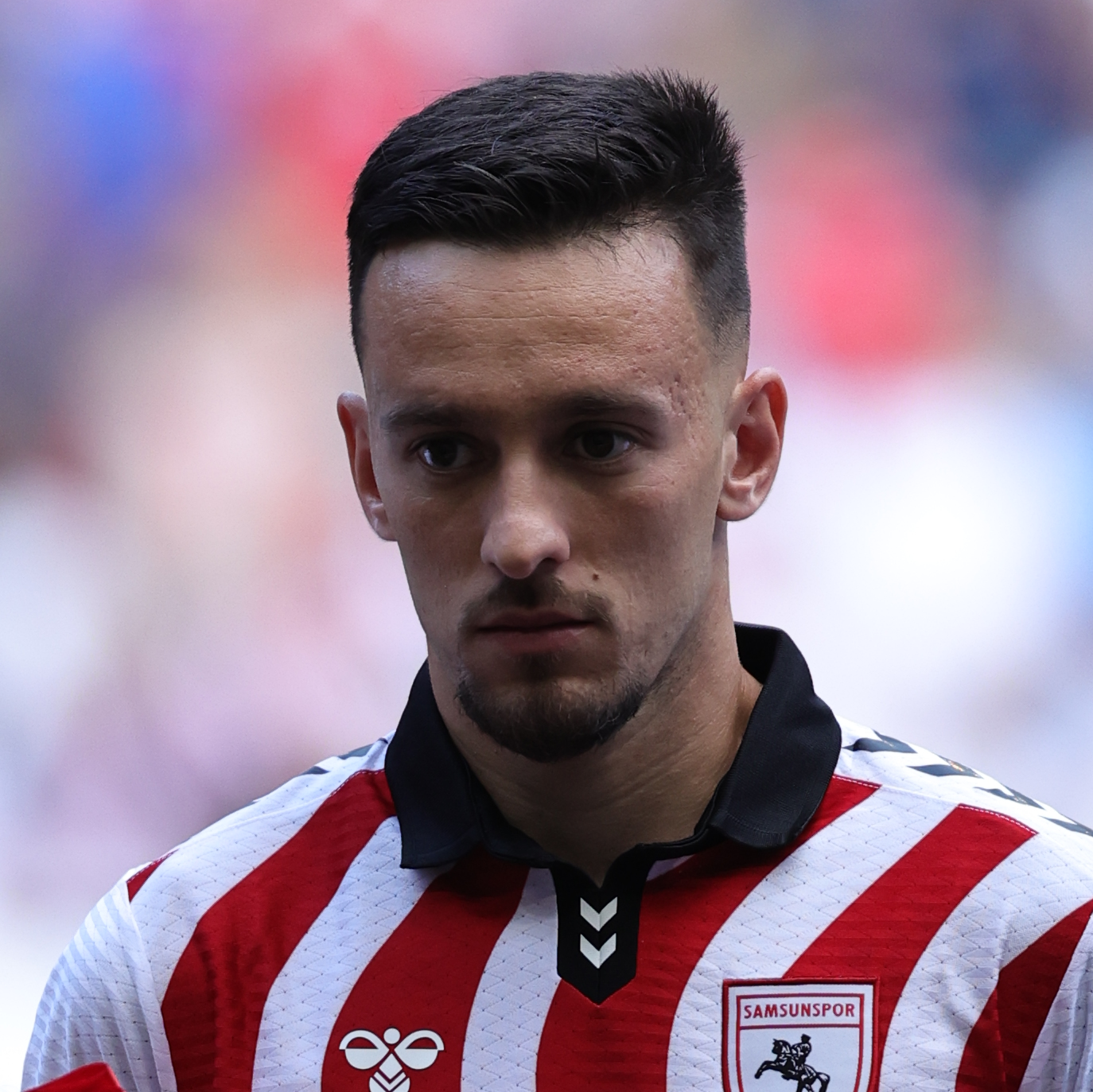
- Sousa with Samsunspor in 2025

Personal information
- Full name: Afonso Gamelas de Pinho Sousa
- Date of birth: 3 May 2000 (age 26)
- Place of birth: Aveiro, Portugal
- Height: 1.74 m (5 ft 9 in)
- Position: Central midfielder

Team information
- Current team: Samsunspor
- Number: 77

Youth career
- 2008–2009: Beira-Mar
- 2009–2010: Porto
- 2010–2012: Beira-Mar
- 2012–2013: Gafanha
- 2013–2019: Porto

Senior career*
Years	Team	Apps	(Gls)
2019–2020	Porto B	21	(6)
2020–2022	B-SAD	62	(3)
2022–2025	Lech Poznań	73	(17)
2022	Lech Poznań II	1	(0)
2025–	Samsunspor	8	(1)

International career
2015	Portugal U15	2	(0)
2016	Portugal U16	10	(2)
2016–2017	Portugal U17	15	(0)
2018	Portugal U18	2	(0)
2018–2019	Portugal U19	3	(0)
2019	Portugal U20	4	(0)
2021–2023	Portugal U21	13	(3)
- * Club domestic league appearances and goals as of 12:38, 6 July 2026 (UTC)

Afonso Gamelas de Pinho Sousa (born 3 May 2000) is a Portuguese professional footballer who plays for Süper Lig club Samsunspor as a central midfielder.

== Club career ==
=== Porto ===
Born in Aveiro, Sousa returned to FC Porto's youth academy at the age of 13, after a first spell in 2009. He made his senior debut with the reserve team in the LigaPro on 25 August 2019, playing the entire 3–1 away win against S.C. Farense and scoring in the match.

Sousa was part of the squad that won the 2018–19 UEFA Youth League, notably netting in the 3–1 victory over Chelsea in the final.

=== B-SAD ===
On 9 September 2020, Sousa signed a four-year contract with Primeira Liga club B-SAD, with Porto retaining 50% of the player's rights. He played his first game in the competition nine days later, coming on as a 67th-minute substitute for Silvestre Varela in the 1–0 away defeat of Vitória de Guimarães. He scored his first goal on 6 December, just before half-time in a 2–1 home win over S.C. Braga.

=== Lech Poznań ===
On 30 June 2022, Sousa moved to defending Polish Ekstraklasa champions Lech Poznań on a four-year deal, for a fee reported around €1,200,000. He made his competitive debut on 9 July, coming on as a substitute in a 2–0 Polish Super Cup loss to Raków Częstochowa.

In the 2024–25 season, Sousa earned himself a regular spot in the starting line-up. On 24 May 2025, he scored Lech's sole goal against Piast Gliwice, a header in the 39th minute, to clinch their ninth league title. With a further 12 with six assists, he was named the Ekstraklasa Midfielder of the Season.

=== Samsunspor ===
On 15 August 2025, Sousa joined Süper Lig club Samsunspor on a five-year contract, for a reported fee of €3 million.

== International career ==
Sousa earned 42 caps for Portugal across all youth levels, starting with the under-15 team in 2015. His first appearance for the under-21s came on 7 October 2021 in an 11–0 home rout of Liechtenstein in 2023 UEFA European Championship qualification. He scored his first goal the following 24 September, closing the 4–1 friendly win over Georgia.

== Personal life ==
Both Sousa's father, Ricardo, and grandfather António, played as midfielders and later worked as managers.

== Career statistics ==
As of match played 16 May 2026

Appearances and goals by club, season and competition
Club	Season	League			National cup (Note: Includes Taça de Portugal, Polish Cup and Turkish Cup)		League cup (Note: Includes Taça da Liga)		Continental		Other		Total	
Club	Season	Division	Apps	Goals	Apps	Goals	Apps	Goals	Apps	Goals	Apps	Goals	Apps	Goals
Porto B	2019–20	LigaPro	21	6	—		—		—		—		21	6
B-SAD	2020–21	Primeira Liga	32	2	3	0	0	0	—		—		35	2
B-SAD	2021–22	Primeira Liga	30	1	3	2	1	0	—		—		34	3
B-SAD	Total		62	3	6	2	1	0	—		—		69	5
Lech Poznań	2022–23	Ekstraklasa	24	4	1	1	—		8 (Note: Appearances in UEFA Europa Conference League)	2	1 (Note: Appearance in Polish Super Cup)	0	34	7
Lech Poznań	2023–24	Ekstraklasa	18	0	1	0	—		4	0	—		23	0
Lech Poznań	2024–25	Ekstraklasa	31	13	1	0	—		—		—		32	13
Lech Poznań	2025–26	Ekstraklasa	0	0	0	0	—		1 (Note: Appearance in UEFA Champions League)	0	1	0	2	0
Lech Poznań	Total		73	17	3	1	—		13	2	2	0	91	20
Lech Poznań II	2022–23	II liga	1	0	0	0	—		—		—		1	0
Samsunspor	2025–26	Süper Lig	8	1	1	0	—		0	0	—		9	1
Career total			165	27	10	3	1	0	13	2	2	0	191	32

== Honours ==
Porto

- UEFA Youth League: 2018–19

Lech Poznań

- Ekstraklasa: 2024–25

Individual

- Ekstraklasa Midfielder of the Season: 2024–25
