= 2020–21 Polish Cup =

Fortuna Puchar Polski

Tournament details
- Country: Poland
- Dates: 8 August 2020 – 2 May 2021
- Teams: 68

Final positions
- Champions: Raków Częstochowa (1st title)
- Runners-up: Arka Gdynia

Tournament statistics
- Matches played: 66
- Goals scored: 208 (3.15 per match)
- Top goal scorer(s): Vladislavs Gutkovskis (5 goals)

The 2020–21 Polish Cup was the 67th season of the annual Polish football knockout tournament. It began on 8 August 2020 with the first matches of the preliminary round and ended with the final on 2 May 2021 at Arena Lublin. The 2020–21 edition of the Polish Cup was sponsored by Fortuna, making the official name Fortuna Puchar Polski. Winners of the competition qualified for the second qualifying round of the 2021–22 UEFA Europa Conference League.

The defending champions Cracovia were eliminated by Raków Częstochowa in the semi-finals. Raków won the final 2–1 against Arka Gdynia, achieving their first Polish Cup title ever.

== Participating teams ==
| Teams starting the competition from Round of 64 | | | | Teams starting the competition from Preliminary round |
| 2019–20 Ekstraklasa; 16 teams | 2019–20 I liga 18 teams | 2019–20 II liga 10 teams (position 1-10) | Winners of 16 regional cup competitions 16 teams | 2019–20 II liga 8 teams (position 11-18) |
| Legia Warsaw; Lech Poznań; Piast Gliwice; Lechia Gdańsk; Śląsk Wrocław; Pogoń Szczecin; Cracovia; Jagiellonia Białystok; Górnik Zabrze; Raków Częstochowa; Zagłębie Lubin; Wisła Płock; Wisła Kraków; Arka Gdynia; Korona Kielce; ŁKS Łódź | Stal Mielec; Podbeskidzie Bielsko-Biała; Warta Poznań; Radomiak Radom; Miedź Legnica; Bruk-Bet Termalica Nieciecza; Chrobry Głogów; Puszcza Niepołomice; GKS Tychy; Stomil Olsztyn; Zagłębie Sosnowiec; Sandecja Nowy Sącz; Odra Opole; GKS Jastrzębie; GKS Bełchatów; Olimpia Grudziądz; Chojniczanka Chojnice; Wigry Suwałki | Górnik Łęczna; Widzew Łódź; GKS Katowice; Bytovia Bytów; Resovia; Stal Rzeszów; Garbarnia Kraków; Olimpia Elbląg; Znicz Pruszków; Pogoń Siedlce | Ślęza Wrocław (dolnośląskie); Unia Janikowo (kujawsko-pomorskie); Orlęta Radzyń Podlaski (lubelskie); Lechia Zielona Góra (lubuskie); Unia Skierniewice (łódzkie); Podhale Nowy Targ (małopolskie); Świt Nowy Dwór Mazowiecki (mazowieckie); Polonia Nysa (opolskie); Karpaty Krosno (podkarpackie); Ruch Wysokie Mazowieckie (podlaskie); Jaguar Gdańsk (pomorskie); Pniówek Pawłowice Śląskie (śląskie); KSZO Ostrowiec Świętokrzyski (świętokrzyskie); Sokół Ostróda (warmińsko-mazurskie); KKS 1925 Kalisz (wielkopolskie); Świt Szczecin (zachodniopomorskie) | Górnik Polkowice; Błękitni Stargard; Lech Poznań II; Skra Częstochowa; Stal Stalowa Wola; Elana Toruń; Legionovia Legionowo; ~~Gryf Wejherowo~~^{1} |

Notes

1. Gryf Wejherowo was excluded from the competition.

== Prize money ==
The PZPN Board of Directors determined the size of the prizes at its meeting on April 27, 2020.

| Round reached | Amount |
|---|---|
| Round of 64 | regional cup winner: 40,000 PLN remainder teams: 10,000 PLN |
| Round of 32 | 45,000 PLN |
| Round of 16 | 90,000 PLN |
| Quarterfinal | 190,000 PLN |
| Semifinal | 380,000 PLN |
| Final | 760,000 PLN |
| Winner | 5,000,000 PLN |

== Round and draw dates ==
| Round | Draw date | Number of teams | Date of matches | Teams entered for the competition |
|---|---|---|---|---|
| Preliminary round | | 68 → 64 | 8-9 August 2020 | • 2019–20 II liga teams from positions 11–18 |
| Round of 64 | 27 July 2020 | 64 → 32 | 13 August - 2 September 2020 | • 2019–20 Ekstraklasa teams, • 2019–20 I liga teams, • 2019–20 II liga teams from positions 1–10, • winners of the regional cups |
| Round of 32 | 11 September 2020 | 32 → 16 | 30 October - 2 December 2020 | None |
| Round of 16 | 8 December 2020 | 16 → 8 | 9-16 February 2021 | None |
| Quarter-finals | 12 February 2021 | 8 → 4 | 2-3 March 2021 | None |
| Semi-finals | 4 March 2021 | 4 → 2 | 7-14 April 2021 | None |
| Final | None | 2 | 2 May 2021 | None |

== Preliminary round ==
The matches were played on 8 and 9 August 2020. Participating in this round were the 8 lowest ranked teams from 2019–20 II liga (which finished 2019–20 season on positions 11-18). With reference to the competition regulations, the matches were played according to the following scheme: 11th team of 2019–20 season will be a host of match against 18th team, 12th team will be a host of match against 17th team, 13th team will be a host of match against 16th team, 14th team will be a host of match against 15th team.

| Team 1 | Score | Team 2 |
|---|---|---|
| Górnik Polkowice (3) | 3–0 (awarded)^{1} | Gryf Wejherowo (4) |
8 August 2020
| Błękitni Stargard (3) | 2–0 | Legionovia Legionowo (4) |
| Lech Poznań II (3) | 3–2 | Elana Toruń (4) |
9 August 2020
| Skra Częstochowa (3) | 1–3 | Stal Stalowa Wola (4) |

Notes

- Note 1: Gryf Wejherowo was excluded from the competition.

| 8 August 2020 | Lech Poznań II | 3–2 | Elana Toruń | Wronki |
| 12:00 CEST (UTC+02:00) | Wilak 2'; Prałat 22'; Pacławski 56' | Łączy nas piłka 90minut | Kryszak 71' (pen.); Kołodziej 79' | Stadium: Stadion Amiki; Referee: Paweł Dziopak (Tychy) |

| 8 August 2020 | Błękitni Stargard | 2–0 | Legionovia Legionowo | Stargard |
| 13:00 CEST (UTC+02:00) | Bochnak 12', 48' | Łączy nas piłka 90minut | | Stadium: Stadion Miejski; Referee: Łukasz Ostrowski (Szczecin) |

| 9 August 2020 | Skra Częstochowa | 1–3 | Stal Stalowa Wola | Częstochowa |
| 16:30 CEST (UTC+02:00) | Gołębiowski 57' | Łączy nas piłka 90minut | Mroziński 6' (pen.); Śpiewak 45'; Fidziukiewicz 86' | Stadium: Stadion Skry; Attendance: 120; Referee: Mateusz Złotnicki (Lublin) |

== Round of 64 ==
The draw for this round was conducted in the headquarter of PZPN on 27 July 2020. The matches were played from 13 August to 2 September 2020. Participating in this round were the 4 winners from the previous round, 16 teams from the 2019–20 Ekstraklasa, 18 teams from the 2019–20 I liga, 10 highest ranked teams from 2019–20 II liga and 16 winners of the regional cup competitions. Games were hosted by teams playing in the lower division in the 2020–21 season or by first drawn teams in a case of match between clubs from the same division.

| Team 1 | Score | Team 2 |
13 August 2020
| Ślęza Wrocław (4) | 2–1 | Wigry Suwałki (3) |
| Lechia Zielona Góra (4) | 1–4 | Świt Szczecin (4) |
| Świt Nowy Dwór Mazowiecki (4) | 1–3 | Zagłębie Lubin (1) |
| Górnik Zabrze (1) | 3–1 | Jagiellonia Białystok (1) |
14 August 2020
| GKS Bełchatów (2) | 1–6 | Legia Warsaw (1) |
| Ruch Wysokie Mazowieckie (4) | 0–2 | Znicz Pruszków (3) |
| Jaguar Gdańsk (5) | 1–4 | Puszcza Niepołomice (2) |
15 August 2020
| Odra Opole (2) | 1–3 | Lech Poznań (1) |
| Resovia (2) | 0–4 | Piast Gliwice (1) |
| KKS 1925 Kalisz (3) | 0–3 (awarded) | Korona Kielce (2) |
| Unia Skierniewice (4) | 0–4 | Widzew Łódź (2) |
| Unia Janikowo (4) | 1–0 | Zagłębie Sosnowiec (2) |
| Stal Rzeszów (3) | 0–1 | Podbeskidzie Bielsko-Biała (1) |
| GKS Tychy (2) | 1–2 | Wisła Płock (1) |
| Pniówek Pawłowice Śląskie (4) | 2–3 | Sokół Ostróda (3) |
| KSZO Ostrowiec Świętokrzyski (4) | 2–1 | Wisła Kraków (1) |
| Karpaty Krosno (5) | 0–2 | Stal Mielec (1) |
16 August 2020
| Chrobry Głogów (2) | 1–2 (a.e.t.) | Cracovia (1) |
| Błękitni Stargard (3) | 3–3 (a.e.t.) (4–5 p) | Warta Poznań (1) |
| ŁKS Łódź (2) | 2–2 (a.e.t.) (4–1 p) | Śląsk Wrocław (1) |
19 August 2020
| Stal Stalowa Wola (4) | 0–4 | Lechia Gdańsk (1) |
21 August 2020
| Chojniczanka Chojnice (3) | 1–0 | Olimpia Elbląg (3) |
22 August 2020
| Garbarnia Kraków (3) | 1–0 | GKS Katowice (3) |
| Stomil Olsztyn (2) | 2–3 | GKS Jastrzębie (2) |
| Radomiak Radom (2) | 4–0 | Miedź Legnica (2) |
| Olimpia Grudziądz (3) | 2–0 | Lech Poznań II (3) |
23 August 2020
| Górnik Polkowice (3) | 0–5 | Arka Gdynia (2) |
| Bytovia Bytów (3) | 0–4 | Bruk-Bet Termalica Nieciecza (2) |
25 August 2020
| Sandecja Nowy Sącz (2) | 0–3 | Raków Częstochowa (1) |
2 September 2020
| Polonia Nysa (4) | 1–3 | Górnik Łęczna (2) |
| Podhale Nowy Targ (4) | 0–5 | Pogoń Szczecin (1) |
| Orlęta Radzyń Podlaski (4) | 0–2 | Pogoń Siedlce (3) |

| 13 August 2020 | Ślęza Wrocław | 2–1 | Wigry Suwałki | Wrocław |
| 16:00 CEST (UTC+02:00) | Pisarczuk 14' (pen.), 63' (pen.) | Łączy nas piłka 90minut | Olejniczak 53' (o.g.) | Stadium: Ślęza Training Center; Attendance: 396; Referee: Paweł Pskit (Łódź) |

| 13 August 2020 | Lechia Zielona Góra | 1–4 | Świt Szczecin | Zielona Góra |
| 16:00 CEST (UTC+02:00) | Kobusiński 70' | Łączy nas piłka 90minut | Nagamatsu 68'; Bil 80'; Filipowicz 85'; Babij 90' (o.g.) | Stadium: Stadion MOSiR; Attendance: 365; Referee: Maciej Pelka (Poznań) |

| 13 August 2020 | Świt Nowy Dwór Mazowiecki | 1–3 | Zagłębie Lubin | Nowy Dwór Mazowiecki |
| 16:00 CEST (UTC+02:00) | Drewnowski 75' | Łączy nas piłka 90minut | Żubrowski 6'; Bashkirov 78'; Bohar 84' | Stadium: Stadion Miejski; Attendance: 212; Referee: Łukasz Kuźma (Białystok) |

| 13 August 2020 | Górnik Zabrze | 3–1 | Jagiellonia Białystok | Zabrze |
| 20:30 CEST (UTC+02:00) | Nowak 15'; Jiménez 61'; Bochniewicz 66' | Łączy nas piłka 90minut | Puljić 33' | Stadium: Stadion im. Ernesta Pohla; Attendance: 4,568; Referee: Wojciech Myć (Lublin) |

| 14 August 2020 | Ruch Wysokie Mazowieckie | 0–2 | Znicz Pruszków | Wysokie Mazowieckie |
| 16:00 CEST (UTC+02:00) | | Łączy nas piłka 90minut | Bochenek 33'; Szymański 76' | Stadium: Stadion Miejski; Attendance: 317; Referee: Wojciech Krztoń (Olsztyn) |

| 14 August 2020 | Jaguar Gdańsk | 1–4 | Puszcza Niepołomice | Gdańsk |
| 17:00 CEST (UTC+02:00) | Sawicki 83' | Łączy nas piłka 90minut | Mikołajczyk 16'; Stefanik 29' (pen.), 37'; Żytek 63' | Stadium: Stadion MOSiR; Attendance: 600; Referee: Sylwester Rasmus (Toruń) |

| 14 August 2020 | GKS Bełchatów | 1–6 | Legia Warsaw | Bełchatów |
| 20:30 CEST (UTC+02:00) | Hilbrycht 33' | Łączy nas piłka 90minut | Rosołek 12', 28', 67'; Pawlik 44' (o.g.); Wszołek 53'; Mladenović 60' | Stadium: GIEKSA Arena; Attendance: 990; Referee: Damian Sylwestrzak (Wrocław) |

| 15 August 2020 | Pniówek Pawłowice Śląskie | 2–3 | Sokół Ostróda | Pawłowice |
| 14:00 CEST (UTC+02:00) | Glenc 53'; Adamek 60' | Łączy nas piłka 90minut | Ziółkowski 32', 90+2'; Wolny 86' | Stadium: Stadion GOS; Attendance: 97; Referee: Damian Gawęcki (Kielce) |

| 15 August 2020 | KKS 1925 Kalisz | 0–3 (awarded) | Korona Kielce | Kalisz |
| 16:00 CEST (UTC+02:00) | Majewski 65'; Chojnowski 90' | Łączy nas piłka 90minut | | Stadium: Stadion Miejski; Attendance: 950; Referee: Damian Kos (Gdańsk) |
Note: Korona Kielce was awarded with 3–0 victory by Polish Football Association due to ineligible player in KKS 1925 Kalisz team. KKS 1925 Kalisz won 2–0 on the pitch.

| 15 August 2020 | Unia Skierniewice | 0–4 | Widzew Łódź | Skierniewice |
| 16:00 CEST (UTC+02:00) | | Łączy nas piłka 90minut | Tanżyna 8'; Ojamaa 24'; Prochownik 37'; Nowak 81' | Stadium: Stadion Miejski; Attendance: 990; Referee: Patryk Gryckiewicz (Toruń) |

| 15 August 2020 | Unia Janikowo | 1–0 | Zagłębie Sosnowiec | Janikowo |
| 16:00 CEST (UTC+02:00) | Garstka 22' | Łączy nas piłka 90minut | | Stadium: Stadion Miejski; Attendance: 560; Referee: Konrad Kiełczewski (Białystok) |

| 15 August 2020 | Stal Rzeszów | 0–1 | Podbeskidzie Bielsko-Biała | Rzeszów |
| 16:00 CEST (UTC+02:00) | | Łączy nas piłka 90minut | Danielak 33' | Stadium: Stadion Miejski; Attendance: 921; Referee: Jacek Małyszek (Lublin) |

| 15 August 2020 | Karpaty Krosno | 0–2 | Stal Mielec | Krosno |
| 16:00 CEST (UTC+02:00) | | Łączy nas piłka 90minut | Dadok 58'; Tomczyk 76' | Stadium: Stadion MOSiR; Attendance: 999; Referee: Karol Iwanowicz (Lublin) |

| 15 August 2020 | Resovia | 0–4 | Piast Gliwice | Rzeszów |
| 16:30 CEST (UTC+02:00) | | Łączy nas piłka 90minut | Parzyszek 8' (pen.); Steczyk 45' (pen.); Pyrka 88', 90' | Stadium: Stadion Resovii; Attendance: 712; Referee: Mariusz Złotek (Stalowa Wola) |

| 15 August 2020 | GKS Tychy | 1–2 | Wisła Płock | Tychy |
| 19:00 CEST (UTC+02:00) | Szymura 89' | Łączy nas piłka 90minut | Sheridan 26'; Szwoch 51' (pen.) | Stadium: Stadion Miejski; Attendance: 2,084; Referee: Marek Opaliński (Legnica) |

| 15 August 2020 | KSZO Ostrowiec Świętokrzyski | 2–1 | Wisła Kraków | Ostrowiec Świętokrzyski |
| 19:29 CEST (UTC+02:00) | Majewski 68'; Stanisławski 90' | Łączy nas piłka 90minut | Chuca 55' | Stadium: Miejski Stadion Sportowy "KSZO"; Attendance: 3,100; Referee: Tomasz Wajda (Żywiec) |

| 15 August 2020 | Odra Opole | 1–3 | Lech Poznań | Opole |
| 20:30 CEST (UTC+02:00) | Bonecki 90+1' | Łączy nas piłka 90minut | Šatka 14', 76'; Szymczak 87' | Stadium: Stadion Miejski; Attendance: 2,000; Referee: Sebastian Jarzębak (Bytom) |

| 16 August 2020 | Błękitni Stargard | 3–3 (a.e.t.) (4–5 p) | Warta Poznań | Stargard |
| 16:00 CEST (UTC+02:00) | Bochnak 53'; Polkowski 62'; Krawczun 66' | Łączy nas piłka 90minut | Jaroch 35'; Kuzimski 77'; Laskowski 85' | Stadium: Stadion Miejski; Attendance: 317; Referee: Kornel Paszkiewicz (Wrocław) |
| | Penalties |
| | Krawczun (penalty missed); Polkowski (penalty scored); Ostrowski (penalty scored); Niedojad (penalty missed); Bochnak (penalty scored); Ryk (penalty scored); Rajch (penalty missed) | | (penalty scored) Kupczak; (penalty scored) Laskowski; (penalty missed) Kuzimski; (penalty scored) Kieliba; (penalty missed) Handzlik; (penalty scored) Fiedosewicz; (penalty scored) Rybicki |

| 16 August 2020 | Chrobry Głogów | 1–2 (a.e.t.) | Cracovia | Głogów |
| 17:30 CEST (UTC+02:00) | Ilków-Gołąb 80' | Łączy nas piłka 90minut | Râpă 90'; Wdowiak 118' | Stadium: Stadion Chrobrego; Attendance: 642; Referee: Bartosz Frankowski (Toruń) |

| 16 August 2020 | ŁKS Łódź | 2–2 (a.e.t.) (4–1 p) | Śląsk Wrocław | Łódź |
| 20:30 CEST (UTC+02:00) | Domínguez 9' (pen.); Gryszkiewicz 120+2' | Łączy nas piłka 90minut | Pich 42'; Celeban 94' | Stadium: Stadion ŁKS; Attendance: 1,504; Referee: Łukasz Szczech (Warsaw) |
| | Penalties |
| | Wolski (penalty scored); Corral (penalty scored); Dąbrowski (penalty scored); Sobociński (penalty scored) | | (penalty scored) Sobota; (penalty missed) Praszelik; (penalty missed) Golla |

| 19 August 2020 | Stal Stalowa Wola | 0–4 | Lechia Gdańsk | Stalowa Wola |
| 16:30 CEST (UTC+02:00) | | Łączy nas piłka 90minut | Fila 18'; Zwoliński 23'; Gajos 52'; Kałuziński 68' | Stadium: Podkarpackie Centrum Piłki Nożnej; Attendance: 850; Referee: Albert Różycki (Łódź) |

| 21 August 2020 | Chojniczanka Chojnice | 1–0 | Olimpia Elbląg | Chojnice |
| 19:30 CEST (UTC+02:00) | Mikołajczak 40' (pen.) | Łączy nas piłka 90minut | | Stadium: Stadion Miejski; Attendance: 778; Referee: Piotr Urban (Warsaw) |

| 22 August 2020 | Garbarnia Kraków | 1–0 | GKS Katowice | Kraków |
| 12:00 CEST (UTC+02:00) | Radwanek 56' | Łączy nas piłka 90minut | | Stadium: Stadion Garbarni; Attendance: 150; Referee: Konrad Gąsiorowski (Biała Podlaska) |

| 22 August 2020 | Radomiak Radom | 4–0 | Miedź Legnica | Radom |
| 14:30 CEST (UTC+02:00) | Leândro 20' (pen.), 28' (pen.), 66'; Sokół 51' | Łączy nas piłka 90minut | | Stadium: Stadion im. Braci Czachorów; Attendance: 475; Referee: Łukasz Kuźma (Białystok) |

| 22 August 2020 | Olimpia Grudziądz | 2–0 | Lech Poznań II | Grudziądz |
| 16:00 CEST (UTC+02:00) | Janiak 29'; Gulczyński 90' | Łączy nas piłka 90minut | | Stadium: Bronisław Malinowski Stadium; Attendance: 0 (Note: Due to the COVID-19 pandemic, the match have been played behind closed doors without any spectators.); Referee: Tomasz Marciniak (Płock) |

| 22 August 2020 | Stomil Olsztyn | 2–3 | GKS Jastrzębie | Olsztyn |
| 19:45 CEST (UTC+02:00) | Kovaļonoks 15'; Szota 56' | Łączy nas piłka 90minut | Wolniewicz 10'; Ali 76', 90' | Stadium: Stadion OSiR; Attendance: 770; Referee: Paweł Pskit (Łódź) |

| 23 August 2020 | Górnik Polkowice | 0–5 | Arka Gdynia | Polkowice |
| 12:40 CEST (UTC+02:00) | | Łączy nas piłka 90minut | da Silva 57'; Mazek 59'; Letniowski 66', 73' (pen.); Danch 89' | Stadium: Stadion Miejski; Attendance: 420; Referee: Damian Kos (Gdańsk) |

| 23 August 2020 | Bytovia Bytów | 0–4 | Bruk-Bet Termalica Nieciecza | Bytów |
| 15:00 CEST (UTC+02:00) | | Łączy nas piłka 90minut | Wlazło 20', 34' (pen.), 36' (pen.); Śpiewak 49' | Stadium: Stadion MOSiR; Attendance: 290; Referee: Artur Aluszyk (Szczecin) |

| 25 August 2020 | Sandecja Nowy Sącz | 0–3 | Raków Częstochowa | Nowy Sącz |
| 20:30 CEST (UTC+02:00) | | Łączy nas piłka 90minut | Tijanić 8'; Piątkowski 21'; Gutkovskis 72' (pen.) | Stadium: Stadion im. Ojca Władysława Augustynka; Attendance: 0 Referee: Damian Sylwestrzak (Wrocław) |
Note: Match originally scheduled on 14th August 2020, 17:30 CEST (UTC+02:00) was postponed due to COVID-19 disease detection in Sandecja Nowy Sącz team.

| 2 September 2020 | Polonia Nysa | 1–3 | Górnik Łęczna | Nysa |
| 16:00 CEST (UTC+02:00) | Mamis 13' | Łączy nas piłka 90minut | Krykun 90'; Banaszak 90+2', 90+4' | Stadium: Stadion Polonii; Attendance: 380; Referee: Szymon Lizak (Poznań) |
Note: Match originally scheduled on 15th August 2020, 16:00 CEST (UTC+02:00) was postponed due to COVID-19 disease detection in Polonia Nysa team.

| 2 September 2020 | Podhale Nowy Targ | 0–5 | Pogoń Szczecin | Nowy Targ |
| 16:00 CEST (UTC+02:00) | | Łączy nas piłka 90minut | Smoliński 7'; Kucharczyk 17' (pen.); Gorgon 29'; Drygas 81' (pen.), 82' | Stadium: Stadion Miejski im. Józefa Piłsudskiego; Attendance: 0 Referee: Daniel Kruczyński (Żywiec) |
Note: Match originally scheduled on 16th August 2020, 16:00 CEST (UTC+02:00) was postponed due to COVID-19 disease detection in Pogoń Szczecin team.

| 2 September 2020 | Orlęta Radzyń Podlaski | 0–2 | Pogoń Siedlce | Radzyń Podlaski |
| 16:00 CEST (UTC+02:00) | | Łączy nas piłka 90minut | Walków 1', 70' | Stadium: Stadion Miejski; Attendance: 350; Referee: Marcin Szczerbowicz (Olsztyn) |
Note: Match originally scheduled on 16th August 2020, 15:00 CEST (UTC+02:00) was postponed due to COVID-19 disease detection in Pogoń Siedlce team.

== Round of 32 ==
The draw for this round was conducted in the headquarter of PZPN on 11 September 2020. The matches should be originally played from 29 October to 4 November 2020, but due to COVID-19 disease several of games were postponed. Finally first match of this round has been played on 30 October 2020 and last game has been played on 2 December 2020. Participating in this round were the 32 winners from the previous round. Games were hosted by teams playing in the lower division in the 2020–21 season or by first drawn teams in a case of match between clubs from the same division.

| Team 1 | Score | Team 2 |
30 October 2020
| Garbarnia Kraków (3) | 1–3 (a.e.t.) | Chojniczanka Chojnice (3) |
| KSZO Ostrowiec Świętokrzyski (4) | 2–3 | Górnik Zabrze (1) |
| Bruk-Bet Termalica Nieciecza (2) | 0–2 | Raków Częstochowa (1) |
| Sokół Ostróda (3) | 1–3 (a.e.t.) | Warta Poznań (1) |
31 October 2020
| Unia Janikowo (4) | 0–2 | ŁKS Łódź (2) |
| Pogoń Siedlce (3) | 0–1 | Radomiak Radom (2) |
2 November 2020
| Znicz Pruszków (3) | 2–3 | Lech Poznań (1) |
3 November 2020
| Ślęza Wrocław (4) | 0–2 | Górnik Łęczna (2) |
4 November 2020
| GKS Jastrzębie (2) | 0–2 | Puszcza Niepołomice (2) |
| Arka Gdynia (2) | 2–0 | Korona Kielce (2) |
14 November 2020
| Świt Szczecin (4) | 0–1 | Cracovia (1) |
17 November 2020
| Olimpia Grudziądz (3) | 0–1 | Lechia Gdańsk (1) |
20 November 2020
| Wisła Płock (1) | 1–1 (a.e.t.) (3–4 p) | Pogoń Szczecin (1) |
25 November 2020
| Widzew Łódź (2) | 0–1 | Legia Warsaw (1) |
1 December 2020
| Podbeskidzie Bielsko-Biała (1) | 2–4 (a.e.t.) | Zagłębie Lubin (1) |
2 December 2020
| Stal Mielec (1) | 1–1 (a.e.t.) (3–4 p) | Piast Gliwice (1) |

| 30 October 2020 | Garbarnia Kraków | 1–3 (a.e.t.) | Chojniczanka Chojnice | Kraków |
| 12:30 CET (UTC+01:00) | Kuczak 88' | Łączy nas piłka 90minut | Skrzypczak 85'; Mikołajczak 107'; Górecki 109' (og.) | Stadium: Stadion Garbarni; Attendance: 0 Referee: Jacek Lis (Katowice) |

| 30 October 2020 | KSZO Ostrowiec Świętokrzyski | 2–3 | Górnik Zabrze | Ostrowiec Świętokrzyski |
| 18:00 CET (UTC+01:00) | Trochim 3'; Zaklika 62' | Łączy nas piłka 90minut | Evangelou 39'; Wiśniewski 90+1'; Manneh 90+2' | Stadium: Miejski Stadion Sportowy "KSZO"; Attendance: 0 Referee: Karol Iwanowicz (Lublin) |

| 30 October 2020 | Bruk-Bet Termalica Nieciecza | 0–2 | Raków Częstochowa | Nieciecza |
| 18:00 CET (UTC+01:00) | | Łączy nas piłka 90minut | Gutkovskis 13'; Ivi 73' | Stadium: Stadion Termaliki Bruk-Bet; Attendance: 0 Referee: Tomasz Wajda (Żywiec) |

| 30 October 2020 | Sokół Ostróda | 1–3 (a.e.t.) | Warta Poznań | Ostróda |
| 18:00 CET (UTC+01:00) | Wolny 111' | Łączy nas piłka 90minut | Trałka 100'; Kuzimski 101', 116' | Stadium: Stadion Miejski; Attendance: 0 Referee: Grzegorz Kawałko (Białystok) |

| 31 October 2020 | Unia Janikowo | 0–2 | ŁKS Łódź | Janikowo |
| 12:00 CET (UTC+01:00) | | Łączy nas piłka 90minut | Ebenezer 22'; Corral 27' | Stadium: Stadion Miejski; Attendance: 0 Referee: Patryk Gryckiewicz (Toruń) |

| 31 October 2020 | Pogoń Siedlce | 0–1 | Radomiak Radom | Siedlce |
| 17:00 CET (UTC+01:00) | | Łączy nas piłka 90minut | Jakubik 90+7' | Stadium: Stadion Miejski; Attendance: 0 Referee: Marcin Szczerbowicz (Olsztyn) |

| 2 November 2020 | Znicz Pruszków | 2–3 | Lech Poznań | Pruszków |
| 20:00 CET (UTC+01:00) | Wichtowski 28'; Zagórski 68' | Łączy nas piłka 90minut | Awaed 18'; Ramírez 50', 58' | Stadium: Stadion Znicza; Attendance: 0 Referee: Łukasz Szczech (Warsaw) |

| 3 November 2020 | Ślęza Wrocław | 0–2 | Górnik Łęczna | Wrocław |
| 12:30 CET (UTC+01:00) | | Łączy nas piłka 90minut | Śpiączka 64'; Banaszak 71' | Stadium: Ślęza Training Center; Attendance: 0 Referee: Tomasz Wajda (Żywiec) |

| 4 November 2020 | GKS Jastrzębie | 0–2 | Puszcza Niepołomice | Wodzisław Śląski |
| 12:30 CET (UTC+01:00) | | Łączy nas piłka 90minut | Tomalski 38'; Stefanik 86' (pen.) | Stadium: Stadion MOSiR; Attendance: 0 Referee: Jacek Lis (Katowice) |

| 4 November 2020 | Arka Gdynia | 2–0 | Korona Kielce | Gdynia |
| 17:30 CET (UTC+01:00) | Vinicius 18' (pen.); Jankowski 76' | Łączy nas piłka 90minut | | Stadium: Stadion Miejski; Attendance: 0 Referee: Wojciech Myć (Lublin) |
Note: Match originally scheduled on 30 October 2020, 17:00 CET (UTC+01:00) was postponed due to COVID-19 disease detection in Korona Kielce team.

| 14 November 2020 | Świt Szczecin | 0–1 | Cracovia | Szczecin |
| 12:30 CET (UTC+01:00) | | Łączy nas piłka 90minut | Pik 59' | Stadium: Stadion MOSRiR; Attendance: 0 Referee: Artur Aluszyk (Szczecin) |
Note: Match originally scheduled on 31 October 2020, 12:30 CET (UTC+01:00) was postponed due to COVID-19 disease detection in Świt Szczecin team.

| 17 November 2020 | Olimpia Grudziądz | 0–1 | Lechia Gdańsk | Grudziądz |
| 17:40 CET (UTC+01:00) | | Łączy nas piłka 90minut | Zwoliński 64' (pen.) | Stadium: Bronisław Malinowski Stadium; Attendance: 0 Referee: Łukasz Szczech (Warsaw) |
Note: Match originally scheduled on 31 October 2020, 15:30 CET (UTC+01:00) was postponed due to COVID-19 disease detection in Lechia Gdańsk team.

| 20 November 2020 | Wisła Płock | 1–1 (a.e.t.) (3–4 p) | Pogoń Szczecin | Płock |
| 12:30 CET (UTC+01:00) | Lewandowski 18' | Łączy nas piłka 90minut | Drygas 33' (pen.) | Stadium: Stadion im. Kazimierza Górskiego; Attendance: 0 Referee: Wojciech Myć (Lublin) |
| | Penalties |
| | Szwoch (penalty scored); Lesniak (penalty scored); Pyrdoł (penalty missed); Tomasik (penalty scored); Cabrera (penalty missed); Obradović (penalty missed) | | (penalty missed) Kucharczyk; (penalty scored) Kowalczyk; (penalty scored) Gorgon; (penalty missed) Matynia; (penalty scored) Hostikka; (penalty scored) Zech |
Note: Match originally scheduled on 3 November 2020, 17:00 CET (UTC+01:00) was postponed due to COVID-19 disease detection in Wisła Płock team.

| 25 November 2020 | Widzew Łódź | 0–1 | Legia Warsaw | Łódź |
| 17:40 CET (UTC+01:00) | | Łączy nas piłka 90minut | Cholewiak 6' | Stadium: Stadion Widzewa; Attendance: 0 Referee: Jarosław Przybył (Kluczbork) |
Note: Match originally scheduled on 30 October 2020, 20:00 CET (UTC+01:00) was postponed due to COVID-19 disease detection in Widzew Łódź team.

| 1 December 2020 | Podbeskidzie Bielsko-Biała | 2–4 (a.e.t.) | Zagłębie Lubin | Bielsko-Biała |
| 17:40 CET (UTC+01:00) | Myakushko 63' (pen.), 102' (pen.) | Łączy nas piłka 90minut | Dražić 78' (pen.), 112' (pen.); Šimić 94'; Mráz 106' | Stadium: Stadion Miejski; Attendance: 0 Referee: Mariusz Złotek (Stalowa Wola) |
Note: Match originally scheduled on 29 October 2020, 17:00 CET (UTC+01:00) was postponed due to COVID-19 disease detection in Zagłębie Lubin team.

| 2 December 2020 | Stal Mielec | 1–1 (a.e.t.) (3–4 p) | Piast Gliwice | Mielec |
| 17:40 CET (UTC+01:00) | Dadok 45' | Łączy nas piłka 90minut | Alves 10' | Stadium: Stadion Stali; Attendance: 0 Referee: Damian Sylwestrzak (Wrocław) |
| | Penalties |
| | Getinger (penalty scored); Forsell (penalty scored); Kościelny (penalty scored); Mak (penalty missed); Gliwa (penalty missed) | | (penalty scored) Świerczok; (penalty scored) Badía; (penalty scored) Chrapek; (penalty scored) Malarczyk |
Note: Match originally scheduled on 31 October 2020, 18:30 CET (UTC+01:00) was postponed due to COVID-19 disease detection in Piast Gliwice team.

== Round of 16 ==
Participating in this round were the 16 winners from the previous round. The draw for this round was conducted in the headquarter of PZPN on 8 December 2020. Games were hosted by teams playing in the lower division in the 2020–21 season or by first drawn teams in a case of match between clubs from the same division. The games were played on 9-16 February 2021.

| Team 1 | Score | Team 2 |
9 February 2021
| Puszcza Niepołomice (2) | 3–1 | Lechia Gdańsk (1) |
| Warta Poznań (1) | 0–1 | Cracovia (1) |
| ŁKS Łódź (2) | 2–3 | Legia Warsaw (1) |
10 February 2021
| Pogoń Szczecin (1) | 1–2 | Piast Gliwice (1) |
| Raków Częstochowa (1) | 4–2 | Górnik Zabrze (1) |
11 February 2021
| Zagłębie Lubin (1) | 0–0 (a.e.t.) (5–6 p) | Chojniczanka Chojnice (3) |
| Radomiak Radom (2) | 1–1 (a.e.t.) (3–4 p) | Lech Poznań (1) |
16 February 2021
| Arka Gdynia (2) | 2–1 | Górnik Łęczna (2) |

| 9 February 2021 | Puszcza Niepołomice | 3–1 | Lechia Gdańsk | Sosnowiec |
| 14:30 CET (UTC+01:00) | Nalepa 17' (o.g.); Tomalski 54'; Čikoš 62' | Łączy nas piłka 90minut | Ceesay 3' | Stadium: Stadion Ludowy; Attendance: 0 Referee: Piotr Lasyk (Bytom) |
Note: The game has been played at Stadion Ludowy in Sosnowiec instead of Stadion Puszczy in Niepołomice due to bad pitch condition caused by winter weather.

| 9 February 2021 | Warta Poznań | 0–1 | Cracovia | Grodzisk Wielkopolski |
| 17:30 CET (UTC+01:00) | | Łączy nas piłka 90minut | Rivaldinho 12' | Stadium: Stadion Miejski; Attendance: 0 Referee: Zbigniew Dobrynin (Łódź) |

| 9 February 2021 | ŁKS Łódź | 2–3 | Legia Warsaw | Łódź |
| 20:30 CET (UTC+01:00) | Sobociński 42'; Janczukowicz 56' | Łączy nas piłka 90minut | Slisz 14'; Luquinhas 49'; Pekhart 82' | Stadium: Stadion Miejski ŁKS; Attendance: 0 Referee: Tomasz Wajda (Żywiec) |

| 10 February 2021 | Pogoń Szczecin | 1–2 | Piast Gliwice | Szczecin |
| 17:30 CET (UTC+01:00) | Zahović 90+1' | Łączy nas piłka 90minut | Chrapek 14' (pen.); Winciersz 68' | Stadium: Stadion Miejski; Attendance: 0 Referee: Tomasz Kwiatkowski (Warsaw) |

| 10 February 2021 | Raków Częstochowa | 4–2 | Górnik Zabrze | Bełchatów |
| 20:30 CET (UTC+01:00) | Gutkovskis 3'; Ivi 13', 87' (pen.); Jach 90' | Łączy nas piłka 90minut | Jiménez 55', 72' (pen.) | Stadium: Stadion Miejski; Attendance: 0 Referee: Łukasz Szczech (Warsaw) |

| 11 February 2021 | Zagłębie Lubin | 0–0 (a.e.t.) (5–6 p) | Chojniczanka Chojnice | Lubin |
| 17:30 CET (UTC+01:00) | | Łączy nas piłka 90minut | | Stadium: Stadion Miejski; Attendance: 0 Referee: Damian Kos (Gdańsk) |
| | Penalties |
| | Starzyński (penalty scored); Żubrowski (penalty missed); Wójcicki (penalty scored); Dražić (penalty scored); Szysz (penalty scored); Sirk (penalty scored); Crnomarković (penalty missed) | | (penalty scored) Golański; (penalty missed) Rakowski; (penalty scored) Ziętarski; (penalty scored) Nowak; (penalty scored) Ryczkowski; (penalty scored) Grobelny; (penalty scored) Mudra |
Note: Originally Chojniczanka Chojnice was drawn as a host of the game but due to bad pitch condition at Stadion Miejski in Chojnice caused by winter weather the game has been moved to Lubin.

| 11 February 2021 | Radomiak Radom | 1–1 (a.e.t.) (3–4 p) | Lech Poznań | Sosnowiec |
| 20:30 CET (UTC+01:00) | Radecki 102' (pen.) | Łączy nas piłka 90minut | Puchacz 117' (pen.) | Stadium: Stadion Ludowy; Attendance: 0 Referee: Artur Aluszyk (Szczecin) |
| | Penalties |
| | Karwot (penalty scored); Bodzioch (penalty missed); Radecki (penalty scored); Podliński (penalty scored); Kozak (penalty missed); Cichocki (penalty missed) | | (penalty missed) Tiba; (penalty missed) Kravets; (penalty scored) Puchacz; (penalty scored) Skóraś; (penalty scored) Czerwiński; (penalty scored) Kvekveskiri |
Note: The game will be played at Stadion Ludowy in Sosnowiec instead of Stadion Radomiaka in Radom due to bad pitch condition caused by winter weather.

| 16 February 2021 | Arka Gdynia | 2–1 | Górnik Łęczna | Gdynia |
| 18:00 CET (UTC+01:00) | Deja 20'; Marcjanik 85' | Łączy nas piłka 90minut | Śpiączka 41' | Stadium: Stadion Miejski; Attendance: 0 Referee: Łukasz Kuźma (Białystok) |

== Quarter-finals ==
Participating in this round were the 8 winners from the previous round. The draw for this round was conducted in the PZPN headquarter on 12 February 2021. Games were hosted by teams playing in the lower division in the 2020–21 season or by first drawn teams in a case of match between clubs from the same division. The games were played on 2 and 3 March 2021.

| Team 1 | Score | Team 2 |
2 March 2021
| Puszcza Niepołomice (2) | 2–5 | Arka Gdynia (2) |
| Lech Poznań (1) | 0–2 | Raków Częstochowa (1) |
3 March 2021
| Chojniczanka Chojnice (3) | 0–3 | Cracovia (1) |
| Legia Warsaw (1) | 1–2 | Piast Gliwice (1) |

| 2 March 2021 | Puszcza Niepołomice | 2–5 | Arka Gdynia | Niepołomice |
| 17:30 CET (UTC+01:00) | Stefanik 45+2' (pen.); Čikoš 90+5' | Łączy nas piłka 90minut | Żebrowski 37'; Rosołek 53'; Vinícius 71' (pen.), 88'; Valcarce 90+4' | Stadium: Stadion Puszczy; Attendance: 0 Referee: Paweł Gil (Lublin) |

| 2 March 2021 | Lech Poznań | 0–2 | Raków Częstochowa | Poznań |
| 20:30 CET (UTC+01:00) | | Łączy nas piłka 90minut | Niewulis 69'; Gutkovskis 77' | Stadium: Stadion Miejski; Attendance: 0 Referee: Paweł Raczkowski (Warsaw) |

| 3 March 2021 | Chojniczanka Chojnice | 0–3 | Cracovia | Chojnice |
| 17:30 CET (UTC+01:00) | | Łączy nas piłka 90minut | van Amersfoort 14', 57'; Pik 55' | Stadium: Stadion Miejski; Attendance: 0 Referee: Łukasz Szczech (Warsaw) |

| 3 March 2021 | Legia Warsaw | 1–2 | Piast Gliwice | Warsaw |
| 20:30 CET (UTC+01:00) | Lopes 66' | Łączy nas piłka 90minut | Świerczok 8'; Alves 78' | Stadium: Stadion Wojska Polskiego; Attendance: 0 Referee: Jarosław Przybył (Kluczbork) |

== Semi-finals ==
Participating in this round are the 4 winners from the previous round. The draw for this round was conducted in the PZPN headquarter on 4 March 2021. Games will be hosted by teams playing in the lower division in the 2020–21 season or by first drawn teams in a case of match between clubs from the same division. The games will be played on 7 and 14 April 2021.

| Team 1 | Score | Team 2 |
7 April 2021
| Arka Gdynia (2) | 0–0 (a.e.t.) (4–3 p) | Piast Gliwice (1) |
14 April 2021
| Cracovia (1) | 1–2 | Raków Częstochowa (1) |

| 7 April 2021 | Arka Gdynia | 0–0 (a.e.t.) (4–3 p) | Piast Gliwice | Gdynia |
| 17:30 CEST (UTC+02:00) | | Łączy nas piłka 90minut | | Stadium: Stadion Miejski; Attendance: 0 Referee: Bartosz Frankowski (Toruń) |
| | Penalties |
| | Marcjanik (penalty scored); Deja (penalty scored); Rosołek (penalty missed); Memic (penalty scored); Vinícius (penalty scored) | | (penalty scored) Badía; (penalty scored) Lipski; (penalty missed) Rymaniak; (penalty missed) Chrapek; (penalty scored) Żyro |

| 14 April 2021 | Cracovia | 1–2 | Raków Częstochowa | Kraków |
| 17:30 CEST (UTC+02:00) | Rodin 87' | Łączy nas piłka 90minut | Arak 27'; Gutkovskis 89' | Stadium: Stadion Miejski im. Józefa Piłsudskiego; Attendance: 0 Referee: Paweł Raczkowski (Warsaw) |

== Final ==
2 May 2021
16:00 CEST (UTC+02:00)

| Raków Częstochowa | 2–1 | Arka Gdynia |
|---|---|---|
| Ivi 81'; Tijanić 89' | Łączy nas piłka 90minut | Żebrowski 57' |

Arena Lublin, Lublin (Note: The match was originally planned at the Stadion Energa Gdańsk in Gdańsk, but was moved due to the COVID-19 pandemic in Poland.)
Attendance: 0
Referee: Paweł Gil (Lublin)

| Raków Częstochowa | Arka Gdynia |

| GK | 28 | (Slovakia) Dominik Holec |
| RCB | 4 | (Poland) Kamil Piątkowski |
| CB | 6 | (Poland) Andrzej Niewulis |
| LCB | 24 | (Croatia) Zoran Arsenić | (substituted off) 80' |
| RM | 7 | (Croatia) Fran Tudor |
| RCM | 10 | (Poland) Igor Sapała | (substituted off) 46' |
| LCM | 8 | (United States) Ben Lederman | (substituted off) 85' |
| LM | 23 | (Poland) Patryk Kun |
| RW | 77 | (Poland) Marcin Cebula | (substituted off) 80' |
| LW | 11 | (Spain) Ivi |
| CF | 21 | (Latvia) Vladislavs Gutkovskis | (substituted off) 68' |
Substitutes:
| GK | 1 | (Slovakia) Branislav Pindroch |
| DF | 33 | (Poland) Jarosław Jach |
| MF | 14 | (Poland) Daniel Szelągowski | (substituted on) 85' |
| MF | 17 | (Czech Republic) Petr Schwarz | (substituted on) 80' |
| MF | 20 | (Serbia) Marko Poletanović | (substituted on) 46' |
| MF | 43 | (Slovenia) David Tijanić | (substituted on) 80' |
| MF | 47 | (Poland) Mateusz Wdowiak |
| MF | 71 | (Poland) Wiktor Długosz |
| FW | 18 | (Poland) Jakub Arak | (substituted on) 68' |
Manager:
(Poland) Marek Papszun

| GK | 30 | (Poland) Kacper Krzepisz |
| RB | 15 | (Poland) Arkadiusz Kasperkiewicz | (yellow card) 22' |
| RCB | 29 | (Poland) Michał Marcjanik |
| LCB | 3 | (Netherlands) Haris Memic |
| LB | 26 | (Poland) Adam Danch |
| RCM | 16 | (Poland) Adam Deja |
| LCM | 10 | (Poland) Juliusz Letniowski | | (substituted off) 46' |
| RW | 17 | (Poland) Fabian Hiszpanski | | (substituted off) 59' |
| AM | 14 | (Spain) Luis Valcarce | | (substituted off) 59' |
| LW | 77 | (Poland) Mateusz Żebrowski | | (substituted off) 80' |
| CF | 39 | (Poland) Maciej Rosołek |
Substitutes:
| GK | 22 | (Poland) Daniel Kajzer |
| DF | 18 | (Poland) Paweł Sasin | | (substituted on) 80' |
| DF | 28 | (Poland) Damian Ślesicki |
| MF | 7 | (Ecuador) Christian Alemán |
| MF | 8 | (Brazil) Marcus Vinicius | (yellow card) 79' | (substituted on) 46' |
| FW | 9 | (Poland) Artur Siemaszko | | (substituted on) 59' |
| FW | 21 | (Poland) Kacper Skóra | | (substituted on) 59' |
| FW | 23 | (Poland) Rafał Wolsztyński |
| FW | 25 | (Poland) Łukasz Wolsztyński |
Manager:
(Poland) Dariusz Marzec

Match officials:
Referee:
Paweł Gil
Assistant referees:
Konrad Sapela
Marcin Borkowski
Fourth official:
Damian Sylwestrzak
Video assistant referee:
Tomasz Kwiatkowski
Tomasz Listkiewicz

Match rules

- 90 minutes.
- 30 minutes of extra-time if necessary.
- Penalty shoot-out if scores still level.
- Nine named substitutes.
- Maximum of five substitutions.
