= 2020–21 Lech Poznań season =

Lech Poznań
2020–21 season
- Chairman: Karol Klimczak; Since 1 November 2011; Piotr Rutkowski; Since 27 January 2021
- Manager: Maciej Skorża; Since 10 April 2021; Dariusz Żuraw; 31 March 2019 - 6 April 2021
- Stadium: Stadion Miejski
- Ekstraklasa: 11th
- Polish Cup: Quarter-finals
- UEFA Europa League: Group stage
- Top goalscorer: League: Mikael Ishak (10 goals); All: Mikael Ishak (18 goals)
- Highest home attendance: Ekstraklasa: 17,546 vs. Warta (20 September 2020)
- Lowest home attendance: UEFA Europa League: 0 (4 games); Ekstraklasa: 0 (10 games); Polish Cup: 0 vs. Raków (2 March 2021)
- Average home league attendance: 1,516
- Biggest win: UEFA Europa League: Apollon 0–5 Lech (23 September 2020)
- Biggest defeat: UEFA Europa League: Benfica 4–0 Lech (3 December 2020); Ekstraklasa: Lech 0–4 Pogoń (16 December 2020)
| Home colours | Away colours | Third colours |

Lech Poznań is a Polish football club based in Poznań. This was their 98th season overall. They competed in Ekstraklasa, the highest ranking league in Poland.

Due to COVID-19 pandemic in Poland in all Ekstraklasa and Polish Cup matches the number of spectators may reach at maximum 50% of stadium capacity. All UEFA Europa League qualification rounds were played behind closed doors. On 1 October 2020 UEFA announced that the group stage games of 2020–21 competition will be opened for fans in a number of at maximum 30% of stadium capacity. On 15 October 2020 Polish government had closed stands for sport teams supporters due to a significant increase of the number of people infected with the COVID-19 disease.

== Club ==
=== Coaching staff ===
| Position | Staff |
|---|---|
| Coach | (Poland) Maciej Skorża |
| Assistant coach | (Poland) Rafał Janas |
| Assistant coach | (Poland) Janusz Góra |
| Assistant coach | (Poland) Dariusz Dudka |
| Goalkeeping coach | (Poland) Michał Chamera |
| Fitness coach | (Poland) Andrzej Kasprzak |
| Fitness coach | (Poland) Karol Kikut |
| Match analyst | (Poland) Hubert Barański |
| Team Doctor | (Poland) Krzysztof Pawlaczyk |
| Team Doctor | (Poland) Paweł Cybulski |
| Team Doctor | (Poland) Andrzej Pyda |
| Team Doctor | (Poland) Damian Bartkiewicz |
| Physiotherapist | (Poland) Maciej Łopatka |
| Physiotherapist | (Poland) Marcin Lis |
| Physiotherapist | (Poland) Maciej Smuniewski |
| Physiotherapist | (Poland) Paweł Tota |
| Dietician | (Poland) Patryk Wiśniewski |
| Team Manager | (Poland) Mariusz Skrzypczak |
| Kit Manager | (Poland) † Eugeniusz Głoziński |
| Kit Manager | (Poland) Sławomir Mizgalski |
| Cook | (Poland) Artur Dzierzbicki |

Source: Lech Poznań

=== Management ===
| Position | Staff |
|---|---|
| Chairman | (Poland) Karol Klimczak |
| Chairman | (Poland) Piotr Rutkowski |
| Sport director | (Poland) Tomasz Rząsa |

Source: Lech Poznań

== Current squad ==
As of 21 February 2021.

Note: Flags indicate national team as defined under FIFA eligibility rules; some limited exceptions apply. Players may hold more than one non-FIFA nationality.

| No. | Pos. | Nation | Player |
|---|---|---|---|
| 1 | GK | NED | Mickey van der Hart (Vice-captain) |
| 3 | DF | UKR | Vasyl Kravets (on loan from (Spain) Leganés) |
| 4 | DF | NOR | Thomas Rogne (Captain) |
| 6 | MF | SWE | Jesper Karlström |
| 8 | MF | CZE | Jan Sýkora |
| 9 | FW | SWE | Mikael Ishak |
| 10 | MF | ESP | Dani Ramírez |
| 11 | MF | POL | Filip Marchwiński |
| 13 | DF | POL | Tomasz Dejewski |
| 14 | FW | GEO | Nika Kacharava (on loan from (Cyprus) Anorthosis) |
| 16 | DF | CRO | Antonio Milić |
| 17 | FW | POL | Filip Wilak |
| 18 | DF | POL | Bartosz Salamon |
| 19 | FW | POL | Norbert Pacławski |
| 20 | FW | USA | Aron Jóhannsson |

| No. | Pos. | Nation | Player |
|---|---|---|---|
| 21 | MF | POL | Michał Skóraś |
| 23 | FW | POL | Filip Szymczak |
| 25 | MF | POR | Pedro Tiba |
| 27 | DF | POL | Tymoteusz Puchacz |
| 28 | DF | POL | Filip Borowski |
| 30 | MF | GEO | Nika Kvekveskiri |
| 31 | GK | POL | Krzysztof Bąkowski |
| 34 | MF | POL | Tymoteusz Klupś |
| 35 | GK | POL | Filip Bednarek |
| 37 | DF | SVK | Ľubomír Šatka |
| 38 | MF | POL | Jakub Kamiński |
| 43 | MF | POL | Antoni Kozubal |
| 44 | DF | POL | Alan Czerwiński |
| 74 | DF | POL | Krystian Palacz |

=== Out on loan ===
Note: Flags indicate national team as defined under FIFA eligibility rules; some limited exceptions apply. Players may hold more than one non-FIFA nationality.

| No. | Pos. | Nation | Player |
|---|---|---|---|
| 5 | DF | SRB | Đorđe Crnomarković (at Zagłębie Lubin until the end of 2020–21 season) |
| 24 | MF | POR | João Amaral (at (Portugal) Paços de Ferreira until the end of 2020–21 season) |
| 40 | DF | POL | Jakub Niewiadomski (at GKS Jastrzębie until the end of 2021–22 season) |
| 99 | GK | POL | Miłosz Mleczko (at Widzew Łódź until the end of 2020–21 season) |
| — | MF | POL | Juliusz Letniowski (at Arka Gdynia until the end of 2020–21 season) |

| No. | Pos. | Nation | Player |
|---|---|---|---|
| — | GK | POL | Bartosz Mrozek (at GKS Katowice until the end of 2020–21 season) |
| — | MF | CRO | Karlo Muhar (at (Turkey) Kayserispor until the end of 2020–21 season) |
| — | MF | POL | Łukasz Norkowski (at GKS Tychy until the end of 2020–21 season) |
| — | MF | POL | Mateusz Skrzypczak (at Stomil Olsztyn until the end of 2021-22 season) |

== Transfer ==
=== Summer transfer window ===
==== In ====
| No. | Pos. | Nat. | Name | Age | EU | Moving from | Type | Transfer window | Ends | Transfer fee | Source |
|---|---|---|---|---|---|---|---|---|---|---|---|
| 24 | MF | (Portugal) | João Amaral | 28 | EU | (Portugal) Paços de Ferreira | Loan return | Summer | 2022 | Free | |
| 29 | FW | (Israel) | Mohammed Awaed | 23 | Non-EU | (Israel) Maccabi Haifa | Loan | Summer | 2021 | Free | |
| 35 | GK | (Poland) | Filip Bednarek | 27 | EU | (Netherlands) Heerenveen | Transfer | Summer | 2022 | Free | |
| 28 | DF | (Poland) | Filip Borowski | 16 | EU | | Transfer | Summer | 2023 | Youth system | |
| 91 | DF | (Ukraine) | Bohdan Butko | 29 | Non-EU | (Ukraine) Shakhtar Donetsk | Loan | Summer | 2020 | Free | |
| 44 | DF | (Poland) | Alan Czerwiński | 27 | EU | Zagłębie Lubin | Transfer | Summer | 2023 | Free | |
| 9 | FW | (Sweden) | Mikael Ishak | 27 | EU | (Germany) 1. FC Nürnberg | Transfer | Summer | 2023 | Free | |
| 14 | FW | (Georgia (country)) | Nika Kacharava | 26 | Non-EU | (Cyprus) Anorthosis Famagusta | Loan | Summer | 2021 | Free | |
| 34 | MF | (Poland) | Tymoteusz Klupś | 20 | EU | Piast Gliwice | Loan return | Summer | 2022 | Free | |
| 3 | DF | (Ukraine) | Vasyl Kravets | 23 | Non-EU | (Spain) Leganés | Loan | Summer | 2021 | Free | |
| 33 | GK | (Croatia) | Marko Malenica | 26 | EU | (Croatia) Osijek | Loan | Summer | 2021 | Free | |
| 15 | MF | (Poland) | Jakub Moder | 21 | EU | (England) Brighton & Hove Albion | Loan | Summer | 2021 | Free | |
| | GK | (Poland) | Bartosz Mrozek | 20 | EU | GKS Katowice | Loan return | Summer | 2022 | Free | |
| | DF | (Poland) | Wiktor Pleśnierowicz | 19 | EU | (Italy) A.S. Roma Youth Sector | Loan return | Summer | 2021 | Free | |
| 8 | MF | (Czech Republic) | Jan Sýkora | 26 | EU | (Czech Republic) Slavia Prague | Transfer | Summer | 2024 | €700,000 | |
| 53 | MF | (Poland) | Filip Wilak | 17 | EU | | Transfer | Summer | 2021 | Youth system | |

Total spending: ▼€700,000

==== Out ====
| No. | Pos. | Nat. | Name | Age | EU | Moving to | Type | Transfer window | Transfer fee | Source |
|---|---|---|---|---|---|---|---|---|---|---|
| 24 | MF | (Portugal) | João Amaral | 28 | EU | (Portugal) Paços de Ferreira | Loan | Summer | Free | |
| 91 | DF | (Ukraine) | Bohdan Butko | 29 | Non-EU | (Ukraine) Shakhtar Donetsk | End of loan | Summer | Free | |
| 19 | MF | (Poland) | Tomasz Cywka | 32 | EU | Chrobry Głogów | End of contract | Summer | Free | |
| 2 | DF | (Poland) | Robert Gumny | 22 | EU | (Germany) FC Augsburg | Transfer | Summer | €2,000,000 | |
| 9 | FW | (Denmark) | Christian Gytkjær | 30 | EU | (Italy) Monza | End of contract | Summer | Free | |
| 7 | MF | (Poland) | Kamil Jóźwiak | 22 | EU | (England) Derby County | Transfer | Summer | €4,300,000 | |
| 22 | DF | (Ukraine) | Volodymyr Kostevych | 27 | Non-EU | (Ukraine) Dynamo Kyiv | Transfer | Summer | Free | |
| 16 | MF | (Poland) | Juliusz Letniowski | 22 | EU | Arka Gdynia | Loan | Summer | Free | |
| 99 | GK | (Poland) | Miłosz Mleczko | 21 | EU | Widzew Łódź | Loan | Summer | Free | |
| 15 | MF | (Poland) | Jakub Moder | 21 | EU | (England) Brighton & Hove Albion | Transfer | Summer | €10,000,000 | |
| | GK | (Poland) | Bartosz Mrozek | 20 | EU | GKS Katowice | Loan | Summer | Free | |
| | MF | (Poland) | Łukasz Norkowski | 20 | EU | GKS Tychy | Loan | Summer | Free | |
| | DF | (Poland) | Wiktor Pleśnierowicz | 19 | EU | Miedź Legnica | Transfer | Summer | Undisclosed | |
| 20 | MF | (Poland) | Mateusz Skrzypczak | 19 | EU | Puszcza Niepołomice | Loan | Summer | Free | |
| 33 | GK | (Poland) | Karol Szymański | 27 | EU | Piast Gliwice | End of contract | Summer | Free | |
| 8 | FW | (Poland) | Paweł Tomczyk | 22 | EU | Stal Mielec | Loan | Summer | Free | |
| 11 | FW | (Russia) | Timur Zhamaletdinov | 23 | Non-EU | (Russia) CSKA Moscow | End of loan | Summer | Free | |

Total income: ▲€16,300,000

Total expenditure: ▲€15,600,000

=== Winter transfer window ===
==== In ====
| No. | Pos. | Nat. | Name | Age | EU | Moving from | Type | Transfer window | Ends | Transfer fee | Source |
|---|---|---|---|---|---|---|---|---|---|---|---|
| 20 | FW | (Iceland) (United States) | Aron Jóhannsson | 30 | Non-EU | (Sweden) Hammarby IF | Transfer | Winter | 2021 | Free | |
| 6 | MF | (Sweden) | Jesper Karlström | 25 | EU | (Sweden) Djurgårdens IF | Transfer | Winter | 2024 | €800,000 | |
| 43 | MF | (Poland) | Antoni Kozubal | 16 | EU | | Transfer | Winter | 2022 | Youth system | |
| 30 | MF | (Georgia (country)) | Nika Kvekveskiri | 28 | Non-EU | (Kazakhstan) Tobol | Transfer | Winter | 2021 | Free | |
| 16 | DF | (Croatia) | Antonio Milić | 26 | EU | (Belgium) Anderlecht | Transfer | Winter | 2023 | €500,000 | |
| 19 | FW | (Poland) | Norbert Pacławski | 16 | EU | | Transfer | Winter | 2022 | Youth system | |
| 74 | DF | (Poland) | Krystian Palacz | 17 | EU | | Transfer | Winter | Undisclosed | Youth system | |
| 18 | DF | (Poland) | Bartosz Salamon | 29 | EU | (Italy) SPAL | Transfer | Winter | 2024 | Free | |
| | MF | (Poland) | Mateusz Skrzypczak | 20 | EU | Puszcza Niepołomice | Loan return | Winter | 2022 | Free | |
| 51 | FW | (Poland) | Hubert Sobol | 20 | EU | Lech Poznań II | Transfer | Winter | 2021 | Free | |
| | FW | (Poland) | Paweł Tomczyk | 22 | EU | Stal Mielec | Loan return | Winter | 2022 | Free | |

Total spending: ▼€1,300,000

==== Out ====
| No. | Pos. | Nat. | Name | Age | EU | Moving to | Type | Transfer window | Transfer fee | Source |
|---|---|---|---|---|---|---|---|---|---|---|
| 29 | FW | (Israel) | Mohammed Awaed | 23 | Non-EU | (Israel) Maccabi Haifa | Loan return | Winter | Free | |
| 91 | DF | (Ukraine) | Bohdan Butko | 29 | Non-EU | (Ukraine) Shakhtar Donetsk | End of loan | Winter | Free | |
| 5 | DF | (Serbia) | Đorđe Crnomarković | 27 | Non-EU | Zagłębie Lubin | Loan | Winter | Free | |
| 33 | GK | (Croatia) | Marko Malenica | 26 | EU | (Croatia) Osijek | Loan return | Winter | Free | |
| 15 | MF | (Poland) | Jakub Moder | 21 | EU | (England) Brighton & Hove Albion | Loan return | Winter | Free | |
| 6 | MF | (Croatia) | Karlo Muhar | 25 | EU | (Turkey) Kayserispor | Loan | Winter | Free | |
| 40 | DF | (Poland) | Jakub Niewiadomski | 18 | EU | GKS Jastrzębie | Loan | Winter | Free | |
| | MF | (Poland) | Mateusz Skrzypczak | 20 | EU | Stomil Olsztyn | Loan | Winter | Free | |
| | FW | (Poland) | Paweł Tomczyk | 22 | EU | Widzew Łódź | Transfer | Winter | €50,000 | |

Total income: ▲€50,000

Total expenditure: ▼€1,250,000

== Friendlies ==
Win Draw Loss

| 12 August 2020 Club friendly | Lech Poznań | 1–1 | (Germany) Kickers Offenbach | Opalenica |
| 17:00 CEST (UTC+02:00) | Ishak 24' | 90minut | 63' (o.g.) | Stadium: Stadion Miejski; Attendance: 0 |

| 14 January 2021 Club friendly | Bandırmaspor (Turkey) | 0–1 | Lech Poznań | Belek, Turkey |
| 15:00 CET (UTC+01:00) | | 90minut Official website | Salamon 12' | Stadium: Calista Sports Center |

| 17 January 2021 Club friendly | Dynamo Moscow (Russia) | 0–2 | Lech Poznań | Belek, Turkey |
| 15:00 CET (UTC+01:00) | | 90minut Official website | Szymczak 21', 26' | Stadium: Regnum Carya Golf & Spa Resort |

| 21 January 2021 Club friendly | Lech Poznań | 0–0 | (Serbia) Rad | Belek, Turkey |
| 12:30 CET (UTC+01:00) | | 90minut Official website | | Stadium: Calista Sports Center |

| 21 January 2021 Club friendly | Lech Poznań | 1–1 | (Ukraine) Shakhtar Donetsk | Belek, Turkey |
| 15:00 CET (UTC+01:00) | Marchwiński 58' | 90minut Official website | Kovalenko 90+1' (pen.) | Stadium: Calista Sports Center; Referee: İbrahim Güner (Turkey) |

| 6 February 2021 Club friendly | Lech Poznań | v | KKS 1925 Kalisz | Poznań |
| 11:00 CEST (UTC+02:00) | | | | Stadium: Lech Poznań training ground |
Note: This game was cancelled on 4 February 2021.

| 26 March 2021 Club friendly | Lech Poznań | 4–0 | KKS 1925 Kalisz | Poznań |
| 12:00 CEST (UTC+02:00) | Skóraś 11', 73', 78' (pen.); Jóhannsson 18' | 90minut Official website | | Stadium: Lech Poznań training ground Attendance: 0 |

== Competitions ==
Win Draw Loss

=== Overview ===
| Competition | First match | Last match | Starting round | Final position | Record | | | | | | | |
| Competition | First match | Last match | Starting round | Final position | Pld | W | D | L | GF | GA | GD | Win % |
|---|---|---|---|---|---|---|---|---|---|---|---|---|
| Ekstraklasa | 21 August 2020 | 16 May 2021 | Matchday 1 | 11th | 30 | 9 | 10 | 11 | 39 | 38 | +1 | 30.00 |
| Polish Cup | 15 August 2020 | 2 March 2021 | Round of 64 | Quarter-finals | 4 | 2 | 1 | 1 | 7 | 6 | +1 | 50.00 |
| UEFA Europa League | 27 August 2020 | 10 December 2020 | First qualifying round | Group stage | 10 | 5 | 0 | 5 | 19 | 15 | +4 | 50.00 |
| Total | | | | | 44 | 16 | 11 | 17 | 65 | 59 | +6 | 36.36 |

Last updated: 17 May 2021
Source: Competitions

=== Ekstraklasa ===
==== League table ====
| Pos | Team | Pld | W | D | L | GF | GA | GD | Pts |
|---|---|---|---|---|---|---|---|---|---|
| 9 | Jagiellonia Białystok | 30 | 10 | 7 | 13 | 39 | 48 | −9 | 37 (Note: Head-to-head points: Jagiellonia Białystok 9, Górnik Zabrze 5, Lech Poznań 2.) |
| 10 | Górnik Zabrze | 30 | 10 | 7 | 13 | 31 | 33 | −2 | 37 |
| 11 | Lech Poznań | 30 | 9 | 10 | 11 | 39 | 38 | +1 | 37 |
| 12 | Wisła Płock | 30 | 8 | 9 | 13 | 37 | 44 | −7 | 33 (Note: Head-to-head matches: Wisła Kraków 0–3 Wisła Płock, Wisła Płock 1–3 Wisła Kraków.) |
| 13 | Wisła Kraków | 30 | 8 | 9 | 13 | 39 | 42 | −3 | 33 |

Source: ekstraklasa.org
Rules for classification: 1) Points; 2) Head-to-head points; 3) Head-to-head goal difference; 4) Head-to-head goals scored; 5) Head-to-head away goals scored (only if between two teams); 6) Goal difference; 7) Goals scored; 8) Number of wins; 9) Number of away wins; 10) Fairplay ranking; 11) Draw

==== Results summary ====
| Overall | | | | | | | | Home | | | | | | Away | | | | | |
| Pld | W | D | L | GF | GA | GD | Pts | W | D | L | GF | GA | GD | W | D | L | GF | GA | GD |
|---|---|---|---|---|---|---|---|---|---|---|---|---|---|---|---|---|---|---|---|
| 30 | 9 | 10 | 11 | 39 | 38 | +1 | 37 | 4 | 7 | 4 | 19 | 17 | +2 | 5 | 3 | 7 | 20 | 21 | −1 |

Last updated: 17 May 2021.
Source: 90minut.pl

==== Results by round ====
| Round | 1 | 2 | 3 | 4 | 5 | 6 | 7 | 8 | 9 | 10 | 11 | 12 | 13 | 14 | 15 | 16 | 17 | 18 | 19 | 20 | 21 | 22 | 23 | 24 | 25 | 26 | 27 | 28 | 29 | 30 |
|---|---|---|---|---|---|---|---|---|---|---|---|---|---|---|---|---|---|---|---|---|---|---|---|---|---|---|---|---|---|---|
| Ground | A | H | A | H | H | A | A | H | A | H | A | H | A | H | A | H | A | H | A | A | H | H | A | H | A | H | A | H | A | H |
| Result | L | D | D | W | L | W | L | D | L | D | W | W | D | L | D | D | L | W | W | W | D | L | L | D | L | W | L | L | W | D |
| Position | 10 | 10 | 9 | 10 | 10 | 6 | 9 | 10 | 12 | 10 | 9 | 8 | 7 | 9 | 10 | 10 | 12 | 11 | 8 | 6 | 6 | 8 | 10 | 11 | 11 | 11 | 11 | 10 | 9 | 11 |

Updated to match(es) played on 17 May 2021. Source: Ekstraklasa 90minut.pl
A = Away; H = Home; W = Win; D = Draw; L = Loss; P = Postponed

==== Matches ====
Win Draw Loss

| 21 August 2020 Match 1 | Zagłębie Lubin | 2–1 | Lech Poznań | Lubin |
| 18:00 CEST (UTC+02:00) | Guldan 82'; Balić 87' | Ekstraklasa; 90minut | Ishak 45+4' | Stadium: Stadion Zagłębia; Attendance: 3,968; Referee: Bartosz Frankowski (Toruń) |

| 30 August 2020 Match 2 | Lech Poznań | 2–2 | Wisła Płock | Poznań |
| 17:30 CEST (UTC+02:00) | Ishak 56'; Kamiński 68' | Ekstraklasa; 90minut | Szwoch 17' (pen.); Tuszyński 88' (pen.) | Stadium: Stadion Miejski; Attendance: 8,226; Referee: Tomasz Kwiatkowski (Warsaw) |

| 12 September 2020 Match 3 | Śląsk Wrocław | 3–3 | Lech Poznań | Wrocław |
| 20:00 CEST (UTC+02:00) | Celeban 12'; Scalet 16'; Pich 51' (pen.) | Ekstraklasa; 90minut | Ishak 7', 32'; Ramírez 28' | Stadium: Stadion Miejski; Attendance: 11,535; Referee: Piotr Lasyk (Bytom) |

| 20 September 2020 Match 4 | Lech Poznań | 1–0 | Warta Poznań | Poznań |
| 17:30 CEST (UTC+02:00) | Moder 90+1' (pen.) | Ekstraklasa; 90minut | | Stadium: Stadion Miejski; Attendance: 17,546; Referee: Piotr Lasyk (Bytom) |

| 4 October 2020 Match 6 | Piast Gliwice | 1–4 | Lech Poznań | Gliwice |
| 17:30 CEST (UTC+02:00) | Żyro 88' (pen.) | Ekstraklasa; 90minut | Moder 6'; Ramírez 43'; Marchwiński 61'; Kacharava 74' (pen.) | Stadium: Stadion Miejski; Attendance: 3,215; Referee: Bartosz Frankowski (Toruń) |

| 17 October 2020 Match 7 | Jagiellonia Białystok | 2–1 | Lech Poznań | Białystok |
| 20:00 CEST (UTC+02:00) | Romanczuk 2'; Makuszewski 68' | Ekstraklasa; 90minut | Moder 82' (pen.) | Stadium: Stadion Miejski; Attendance: 0 Referee: Jarosław Przybył (Kluczbork) |

| 25 October 2020 Match 8 | Lech Poznań | 1–1 | Cracovia | Poznań |
| 17:30 CET (UTC+01:00) | Awaed 86' | Ekstraklasa; 90minut | van Amersfoort 31' | Stadium: Stadion Miejski; Attendance: 0 Referee: Krzysztof Jakubik (Siedlce) |

| 8 November 2020 Match 9 | Legia Warsaw | 2–1 | Lech Poznań | Warsaw |
| 15:00 CET (UTC+01:00) | Skibicki 68'; Lopes 90+3' | Ekstraklasa; 90minut | Juranović 29' (o.g.) | Stadium: Stadion im. Marszałka Józefa Piłsudskiego; Attendance: 0 Referee: Szymon Marciniak (Płock) |

| 22 November 2020 Match 10 | Lech Poznań | 3–3 | Raków Częstochowa | Poznań |
| 12:30 CET (UTC+01:00) | Ishak 33'; Moder 48' (pen.); Ramírez 52' | Ekstraklasa; 90minut | Ivi 16'; Zawada 31'; Szelągowski 90+2' | Stadium: Stadion Miejski; Attendance: 0 Referee: Paweł Gil (Lublin) |

| 30 November 2020 Match 11 | Lechia Gdańsk | 0–1 | Lech Poznań | Gdańsk |
| 18:00 CET (UTC+01:00) | | Ekstraklasa; 90minut | Ishak 84' (pen.) | Stadium: Stadion Miejski; Attendance: 0 Referee: Łukasz Szczech (Warsaw) |

| 6 December 2020 Match 12 | Lech Poznań | 4–0 | Podbeskidzie Bielsko-Biała | Poznań |
| 17:30 CET (UTC+01:00) | Rogne 31'; Ishak 44'; Tiba 47'; Ramírez 53' | Ekstraklasa; 90minut | | Stadium: Stadion Miejski; Attendance: 0 Referee: Wojciech Myć (Lublin) |

| 13 December 2020 Match 13 | Stal Mielec | 1–1 | Lech Poznań | Mielec |
| 15:00 CET (UTC+01:00) | Prokić 27' | Ekstraklasa; 90minut | Tiba 87' | Stadium: Stadion Stali; Attendance: 0 Referee: Paweł Gil (Lublin) |

| 16 December 2020 Match 5 | Lech Poznań | 0–4 | Pogoń Szczecin | Poznań |
| 20:30 CET (UTC+01:00) | | Ekstraklasa; 90minut | Rogne 3' (o.g.); Kowalczyk 39'; Drygas 45+7' (pen.); Podstawski 90+1' | Stadium: Stadion Miejski; Attendance: 0 Referee: Jarosław Przybył (Kluczbork) |
Note: Match originally scheduled on 27 September 2020, 15:00 CEST (UTC+02:00) was postponed by Ekstraklasa due to 2020–21 UEFA Europa League Play-off round match preparation.

| 19 December 2020 Match 14 | Lech Poznań | 0–1 | Wisła Kraków | Poznań |
| 20:00 CET (UTC+01:00) | | Ekstraklasa; 90minut | Błaszczykowski 68' | Stadium: Stadion Miejski; Attendance: 0 Referee: Tomasz Kwiatkowski (Warsaw) |

| 30 January 2021 Match 15 | Górnik Zabrze | 1–1 | Lech Poznań | Zabrze |
| 20:00 CET (UTC+01:00) | Sobczyk 7' | Ekstraklasa; 90minut | Rogne 60' | Stadium: Stadion im. Ernesta Pohla; Attendance: 0 Referee: Tomasz Kwiatkowski (Warsaw) |

| 5 February 2021 Match 16 | Lech Poznań | 0–0 | Zagłębie Lubin | Poznań |
| 20:30 CET (UTC+01:00) | | Ekstraklasa; 90minut | | Stadium: Stadion Miejski; Attendance: 0 Referee: Sebastian Jarzębak (Bytom) |

| 14 February 2021 Match 17 | Wisła Płock | 1–0 | Lech Poznań | Płock |
| 15:00 CET (UTC+01:00) | Šušnjara 73' | Ekstraklasa; 90minut | | Stadium: Stadion im. Kazimierza Górskiego; Attendance: 0 Referee: Zbigniew Dobrynin (Łódź) |

| 21 February 2021 Match 18 | Lech Poznań | 1–0 | Śląsk Wrocław | Poznań |
| 17:30 CET (UTC+01:00) | Jóhannsson 57' | Ekstraklasa; 90minut | | Stadium: Stadion Miejski; Attendance: 0 Referee: Daniel Stefański (Bydgoszcz) |

| 26 February 2021 Match 19 | Warta Poznań | 1–2 | Lech Poznań | Grodzisk Wielkopolski |
| 20:30 CET (UTC+01:00) | Kuzimski 46' | Ekstraklasa; 90minut | Jóhannsson 80'; Tiba 90+4' | Stadium: Stadion Dyskobolii; Attendance: 0 Referee: Jarosław Przybył (Kluczbork) |

| 7 March 2021 Match 20 | Pogoń Szczecin | 0–1 | Lech Poznań | Szczecin |
| 15:00 CET (UTC+01:00) | | Ekstraklasa; 90minut | Salamon 40' | Stadium: Stadion im. Floriana Krygiera; Attendance: 0 Referee: Bartosz Frankowski (Toruń) |

| 14 March 2021 Match 21 | Lech Poznań | 0–0 | Piast Gliwice | Poznań |
| 17:30 CET (UTC+01:00) | | Ekstraklasa; 90minut | | Stadium: Stadion Miejski; Attendance: 0 Referee: Tomasz Kwiatkowski (Warsaw) |

| 20 March 2021 Match 22 | Lech Poznań | 2–3 | Jagiellonia Białystok | Poznań |
| 20:00 CEST (UTC+02:00) | Skóraś 12'; Ishak 40' | Ekstraklasa; 90minut | Černych 2'; Nastić 72'; Wdowik 87' | Stadium: Stadion Miejski; Attendance: 0 Referee: Szymon Marciniak (Płock) |

| 3 April 2021 Match 23 | Cracovia | 2–1 | Lech Poznań | Kraków |
| 20:00 CEST (UTC+02:00) | Sipľak 45'; van Amersfoort 56' | Ekstraklasa; 90minut | Ishak 28' | Stadium: Stadion Cracovii im. Marszałka Józefa Piłsudskiego; Attendance: 0 Referee: Damian Sylwestrzak (Wrocław) |

| 11 April 2021 Match 24 | Lech Poznań | 0–0 | Legia Warsaw | Poznań |
| 17:30 CEST (UTC+02:00) | | Ekstraklasa; 90minut | | Stadium: Stadion Miejski; Attendance: 0 Referee: Bartosz Frankowski (Toruń) |

| 17 April 2021 Match 25 | Raków Częstochowa | 3–1 | Lech Poznań | Bełchatów |
| 17:30 CEST (UTC+02:00) | Tudor 10'; Piątkowski 29'; Cebula 56' | Ekstraklasa; 90minut | Ishak 49' | Stadium: GIEKSA Arena; Attendance: 0 Referee: Daniel Stefański (Bydgoszcz) |

| 20 April 2021 Match 26 | Lech Poznań | 3–0 | Lechia Gdańsk | Poznań |
| 20:30 CEST (UTC+02:00) | Skóraś 52'; Ishak 57' (pen.); Ramirez 65' | Ekstraklasa; 90minut | | Stadium: Stadion Miejski; Attendance: 0 Referee: Paweł Gil (Lublin) |

| 23 April 2021 Match 27 | Podbeskidzie Bielsko-Biała | 1–0 | Lech Poznań | Bielsko-Biała |
| 20:30 CEST (UTC+02:00) | Roginić 74' | Ekstraklasa; 90minut | | Stadium: Stadion Miejski; Attendance: 0 Referee: Krzysztof Jakubik (Siedlce) |

| 1 May 2021 Match 28 | Lech Poznań | 1–2 | Stal Mielec | Poznań |
| 20:00 CEST (UTC+02:00) | Puchacz 80' | Ekstraklasa; 90minut | Kravets 89' (o.g.); de Amo 90+7' | Stadium: Stadion Miejski; Attendance: 0 Referee: Jarosław Przybył (Kluczbork) |

| 8 May 2021 Match 29 | Wisła Kraków | 1–2 | Lech Poznań | Kraków |
| 20:00 CEST (UTC+02:00) | Błaszczykowski 78' | Ekstraklasa; 90minut | Ishak 12'; Szota 61' (o.g.) | Stadium: Stadion Miejski im. Henryka Reymana; Attendance: 0 Referee: Sebastian Jarzębak (Bytom) |

| 16 May 2021 Match 30 | Lech Poznań | 1–1 | Górnik Zabrze | Poznań |
| 17:30 CEST (UTC+02:00) | Ramírez 9' | Ekstraklasa; 90minut | Nowak 77' | Stadium: Stadion Miejski; Attendance: 4,890; Referee: Artur Aluszyk (Szczecin) |

=== Polish Cup ===
| 15 August 2020 Round of 64 | Odra Opole | 1–3 | Lech Poznań | Opole |
| 20:30 CEST (UTC+02:00) | Bonecki 90+1' | Lech Poznań; Łączy nas piłka 90minut | Šatka 14', 76'; Szymczak 87' | Stadium: Stadion Miejski „Odra” Attendance: 2,000; Referee: Sebastian Jarzębak (Bytom) |

| 2 November 2020 Round of 32 | Znicz Pruszków | 2–3 | Lech Poznań | Pruszków |
| 20:00 CET (UTC+01:00) | Wichtowski 28'; Zagórski 68' | Łączy nas piłka 90minut | Awaed 18'; Ramírez 50', 58' | Stadium: Stadion Znicza; Attendance: 0 Referee: Łukasz Szczech (Warsaw) |

| 11 February 2021 Round of 16 | Radomiak Radom | 1–1 (a.e.t.) (3–4 p) | Lech Poznań | Sosnowiec |
| 20:30 CET (UTC+01:00) | Radecki 102' (pen.) | Łączy nas piłka 90minut | Puchacz 117' (pen.) | Stadium: Stadion Ludowy; Attendance: 0 Referee: Artur Aluszyk (Szczecin) |
| | Penalties |
| | Karwot (penalty scored); Bodzioch (penalty missed); Radecki (penalty scored); Podliński (penalty scored); Kozak (penalty missed); Cichocki (penalty missed) | | (penalty missed) Tiba; (penalty missed) Kravets; (penalty scored) Puchacz; (penalty scored) Skóraś; (penalty scored) Czerwiński; (penalty scored) Kvekveskiri |
Note: The game will be played at Stadion Ludowy in Sosnowiec instead of Stadion Radomiaka in Radom due to bad pitch condition caused by winter weather.

| 2 March 2021 Quarter-finals | Lech Poznań | 0–2 | Raków Częstochowa | Poznań |
| 20:30 CET (UTC+01:00) | | Łączy nas piłka 90minut | Niewulis 69'; Gutkovskis 77' | Stadium: Stadion Miejski; Attendance: 0 Referee: Paweł Raczkowski (Warsaw) |

=== UEFA Europa League ===
==== Qualifying phase ====
| 27 August 2020 1Q | Lech Poznań (Poland) | 3–0 | (Latvia) Valmiera | Poznań |
| 21:00 CEST (UTC+02:00) | Ishak 59', 78'; Szymczak 88' | Report | | Stadium: Stadion Miejski; Attendance: 0 Referee: Ondřej Pechanec (Czech Republic) |

| 16 September 2020 2Q | Hammarby IF (Sweden) | 0–3 | (Poland) Lech Poznań | Stockholm, Sweden |
| 19:00 CEST (UTC+02:00) | | Report | Tiba 55'; Kamiński 89'; Marchwiński 90+3' | Stadium: Tele2 Arena; Attendance: 0 Referee: Sascha Stegemann (Germany) |

| 23 September 2020 3Q | Apollon Limassol (Cyprus) | 0–5 | (Poland) Lech Poznań | Nicosia, Cyprus |
| 18:00 CEST (UTC+02:00) | | Report | Tiba 42', 90+2'; Ishak 47'; Kamiński 58'; Sýkora 81' | Stadium: GSP Stadium; Attendance: 0 Referee: Mattias Gestranius (Finland) |

| 1 October 2020 PO | Charleroi (Belgium) | 1–2 | (Poland) Lech Poznań | Charleroi, Belgium |
| 19:00 CEST (UTC+02:00) | Fall 56' | Report | Ramírez 33'; Puchacz 41' | Stadium: Stade du Pays de Charleroi; Attendance: 0 Referee: Felix Zwayer (Germany) |

==== Group stage ====
===== Group D =====
| Pos | Team | Pld | W | D | L | GF | GA | GD | Pts | Qualification | RAN | BEN | STL | LCH |
|---|---|---|---|---|---|---|---|---|---|---|---|---|---|---|
| 1 | (Scotland) Rangers | 6 | 4 | 2 | 0 | 13 | 7 | +6 | 14 | Advance to knockout phase | — | 2–2 | 3–2 | 1–0 |
| 2 | (Portugal) Benfica | 6 | 3 | 3 | 0 | 18 | 9 | +9 | 12 | Advance to knockout phase | 3–3 | — | 3–0 | 4–0 |
| 3 | (Belgium) Standard Liège | 6 | 1 | 1 | 4 | 7 | 14 | −7 | 4 | | 0–2 | 2–2 | — | 2–1 |
| 4 | (Poland) Lech Poznań | 6 | 1 | 0 | 5 | 6 | 14 | −8 | 3 | | 0–2 | 2–4 | 3–1 | — |

Source: UEFA

| 22 October 2020 Round 1 | Lech Poznań (Poland) | 2–4 | (Portugal) Benfica | Poznań |
| 18:55 CEST (UTC+02:00) | Ishak 15', 48' | Report | Pizzi 9' (pen.); Núñez 42', 60', 90+3' | Stadium: Stadion Miejski; Attendance: 0 Referee: Nikola Dabanović (Montenegro) |

| 29 October 2020 Round 2 | Rangers (Scotland) | 1–0 | (Poland) Lech Poznań | Glasgow, Scotland |
| 21:00 CET (UTC+01:00) | Morelos 68' | Report | | Stadium: Ibrox Stadium; Attendance: 0 Referee: Kristo Tohver (Estonia) |

| 5 November 2020 Round 3 | Lech Poznań (Poland) | 3–1 | (Belgium) Standard Liège | Poznań |
| 18:55 CET (UTC+01:00) | Skóraś 14'; Ishak 22', 48' | Report | Lestienne 29' | Stadium: Stadion Miejski; Attendance: 0 Referee: Manuel Schüttengruber (Austria) |

| 26 November 2020 Round 4 | Standard Liège (Belgium) | 2–1 | (Poland) Lech Poznań | Liège, Belgium |
| 21:00 CET (UTC+01:00) | Tapsoba 63'; Laifis 90+4' | Report | Ishak 61' | Stadium: Stade Maurice Dufrasne; Attendance: 0 Referee: Petr Ardeleánu (Czech Republic) |

| 3 December 2020 Round 5 | Benfica (Portugal) | 4–0 | (Poland) Lech Poznań | Lisbon, Portugal |
| 21:00 CET (UTC+01:00) | Vertonghen 36'; Núñez 57'; Pizzi 58'; Weigl 89' | Report | | Stadium: Estádio da Luz; Attendance: 0 Referee: Srđan Jovanović (Serbia) |

| 10 December 2020 Round 6 | Lech Poznań (Poland) | 0–2 | (Scotland) Rangers | Poznań |
| 18:55 CET (UTC+01:00) | | Report | Itten 31'; Hagi 72' | Stadium: Stadion Miejski; Attendance: 0 Referee: José María Sánchez (Spain) |

== Squad statistics ==
=== Appearances and goals ===
As of end of 2020–21 season.

| No. | Pos | Player | Ekstraklasa | | Polish Cup | | UEFA Europa League | | Total | |
| No. | Pos | Player | Apps | Goals | Apps | Goals | Apps | Goals | Apps | Goals |
Goalkeepers
| 1 | GK | (Netherlands) Mickey van der Hart | 15 | 0 | 0 | 0 | 0 | 0 | 15 | 0 |
| 31 | GK | (Poland) Krzysztof Bąkowski | 0 | 0 | 0 | 0 | 0 | 0 | 0 | 0 |
| 35 | GK | (Poland) Filip Bednarek | 15 | 0 | 3 | 0 | 10 | 0 | 28 | 0 |
Defenders
| 3 | DF | (Ukraine) Vasyl Kravets | 10+8 | 0 | 2 | 0 | 2+4 | 0 | 26 | 0 |
| 4 | DF | (Norway) Thomas Rogne | 18 | 2 | 0+1 | 0 | 3+1 | 0 | 23 | 2 |
| 13 | DF | (Poland) Tomasz Dejewski | 3+2 | 0 | 2 | 0 | 2 | 0 | 9 | 0 |
| 16 | DF | (Croatia) Antonio Milić | 8+1 | 0 | 2 | 0 | 0 | 0 | 11 | 0 |
| 18 | DF | (Poland) Bartosz Salamon | 12+1 | 1 | 1 | 0 | 0 | 0 | 14 | 1 |
| 27 | DF | (Poland) Tymoteusz Puchacz | 22+5 | 1 | 2+2 | 1 | 10 | 1 | 41 | 3 |
| 28 | DF | (Poland) Filip Borowski | 0 | 0 | 0+1 | 0 | 0 | 0 | 1 | 0 |
| 37 | DF | (Slovakia) Ľubomír Šatka | 17 | 0 | 1 | 2 | 8+1 | 0 | 27 | 2 |
| 44 | DF | (Poland) Alan Czerwiński | 22+3 | 0 | 2+2 | 0 | 6+3 | 0 | 38 | 0 |
| 74 | DF | (Poland) Krystian Palacz | 0+3 | 0 | 0 | 0 | 0 | 0 | 3 | 0 |
Midfielders
| 6 | MF | (Sweden) Jesper Karlström | 15+1 | 0 | 2 | 0 | 0 | 0 | 18 | 0 |
| 8 | MF | (Czech Republic) Jan Sýkora | 14+8 | 0 | 3 | 0 | 4+3 | 1 | 32 | 1 |
| 10 | MF | (Spain) Dani Ramírez | 27+3 | 6 | 4 | 2 | 8+2 | 1 | 44 | 9 |
| 11 | MF | (Poland) Filip Marchwiński | 5+16 | 1 | 0+2 | 0 | 4+5 | 1 | 32 | 2 |
| 21 | MF | (Poland) Michał Skóraś | 14+12 | 2 | 1+3 | 0 | 6+3 | 1 | 39 | 3 |
| 25 | MF | (Portugal) Pedro Tiba | 25+3 | 3 | 3 | 0 | 8 | 3 | 39 | 6 |
| 30 | MF | (Georgia (country)) Nika Kvekveskiri | 6+6 | 0 | 0+2 | 0 | 0 | 0 | 14 | 0 |
| 34 | MF | (Poland) Tymoteusz Klupś | 0 | 0 | 1 | 0 | 0 | 0 | 1 | 0 |
| 38 | MF | (Poland) Jakub Kamiński | 25+3 | 1 | 3 | 0 | 6+1 | 2 | 38 | 3 |
| 43 | MF | (Poland) Antoni Kozubal | 0+1 | 0 | 0 | 0 | 0 | 0 | 1 | 0 |
Forwards
| 9 | FW | (Sweden) Mikael Ishak | 21+1 | 12 | 1 | 0 | 9+1 | 8 | 33 | 20 |
| 14 | FW | (Georgia (country)) Nika Kacharava | 1+6 | 1 | 1 | 0 | 1+5 | 0 | 14 | 1 |
| 17 | FW | (Poland) Filip Wilak | 0 | 0 | 0 | 0 | 0 | 0 | 0 | 0 |
| 19 | FW | (Poland) Norbert Pacławski | 0+2 | 0 | 0+1 | 0 | 0 | 0 | 3 | 0 |
| 20 | FW | (United States) Aron Jóhannsson | 5+4 | 2 | 1 | 0 | 0 | 0 | 10 | 2 |
| 23 | FW | (Poland) Filip Szymczak | 2+9 | 0 | 1+2 | 1 | 0+1 | 1 | 15 | 2 |
Players who appeared for Lech and left the club during the season:
| 2 | DF | (Poland) Robert Gumny | 1 | 0 | 1 | 0 | 1 | 0 | 3 | 0 |
| 5 | DF | (Serbia) Đorđe Crnomarković | 7+1 | 0 | 2 | 0 | 7 | 0 | 17 | 0 |
| 6 | MF | (Croatia) Karlo Muhar | 2+4 | 0 | 1+1 | 0 | 2+3 | 0 | 13 | 0 |
| 7 | MF | (Poland) Kamil Jóźwiak | 2 | 0 | 1 | 0 | 1 | 0 | 4 | 0 |
| 15 | MF | (Poland) Jakub Moder | 14 | 4 | 1 | 0 | 8+2 | 0 | 25 | 4 |
| 22 | DF | (Ukraine) Volodymyr Kostevych | 0 | 0 | 0 | 0 | 0 | 0 | 0 | 0 |
| 29 | FW | (Israel) Mohammed Awaed | 1+8 | 1 | 1 | 1 | 1+5 | 0 | 16 | 2 |
| 33 | GK | (Croatia) Marko Malenica | 0 | 0 | 1 | 0 | 0 | 0 | 1 | 0 |
| 40 | DF | (Poland) Jakub Niewiadomski | 0 | 0 | 0+1 | 0 | 0 | 0 | 1 | 0 |
| 51 | FW | (Poland) Hubert Sobol | 0+3 | 0 | 0 | 0 | 0 | 0 | 3 | 0 |
| 91 | DF | (Ukraine) Bohdan Butko | 1+2 | 0 | 0 | 0 | 3 | 0 | 6 | 0 |

=== Goalscorers ===
As of end of 2020–21 season.

| Place | Number | Position | Nation | Name | Ekstraklasa | Polish Cup | UEFA Europa League | Total |
|---|---|---|---|---|---|---|---|---|
| 1 | 9 | FW | (Sweden) | Mikael Ishak | 12 | 0 | 8 | 20 |
| 2 | 10 | MF | (Spain) | Dani Ramírez | 6 | 2 | 1 | 9 |
| 3 | 25 | MF | (Portugal) | Pedro Tiba | 3 | 0 | 3 | 6 |
| 4 | 15 | MF | (Poland) | Jakub Moder | 4 | 0 | 0 | 4 |
| 5 | 21 | MF | (Poland) | Michał Skóraś | 2 | 0 | 1 | 3 |
| 5 | 27 | DF | (Poland) | Tymoteusz Puchacz | 1 | 1 | 1 | 3 |
| 5 | 38 | MF | (Poland) | Jakub Kamiński | 1 | 0 | 2 | 3 |
| 8 | 4 | DF | (Norway) | Thomas Rogne | 2 | 0 | 0 | 2 |
| 8 | 11 | MF | (Poland) | Filip Marchwiński | 1 | 0 | 1 | 2 |
| 8 | 20 | FW | (United States) | Aron Jóhannsson | 2 | 0 | 0 | 2 |
| 8 | 23 | FW | (Poland) | Filip Szymczak | 0 | 1 | 1 | 2 |
| 8 | 29 | FW | (Israel) | Mohammed Awaed | 1 | 1 | 0 | 2 |
| 8 | 37 | DF | (Slovakia) | Ľubomír Šatka | 0 | 2 | 0 | 2 |
| 8 | Own goal | | | | 2 | 0 | 0 | 2 |
| 15 | 8 | MF | (Czech Republic) | Jan Sýkora | 0 | 0 | 1 | 1 |
| 15 | 14 | FW | (Georgia (country)) | Nika Kacharava | 1 | 0 | 0 | 1 |
| 15 | 18 | DF | (Poland) | Bartosz Salamon | 1 | 0 | 0 | 1 |
| TOTALS | | | | | 39 | 7 | 19 | 65 |

=== Assists ===
As of end of 2020–21 season.

| Place | Number | Position | Nation | Name | Ekstraklasa | Polish Cup | UEFA Europa League | Total |
|---|---|---|---|---|---|---|---|---|
| 1 | 25 | MF | (Portugal) | Pedro Tiba | 6 | 0 | 3 | 9 |
| 2 | 10 | MF | (Spain) | Dani Ramírez | 3 | 0 | 3 | 6 |
| 3 | 27 | DF | (Poland) | Tymoteusz Puchacz | 1 | 0 | 4 | 5 |
| 4 | 8 | MF | (Czech Republic) | Jan Sýkora | 3 | 1 | 0 | 4 |
| 4 | 44 | DF | (Poland) | Alan Czerwiński | 2 | 0 | 2 | 4 |
| 6 | 38 | MF | (Poland) | Jakub Kamiński | 2 | 0 | 1 | 3 |
| 7 | 7 | MF | (Poland) | Kamil Jóźwiak | 0 | 1 | 1 | 2 |
| 7 | 14 | FW | (Georgia (country)) | Nika Kacharava | 0 | 1 | 1 | 2 |
| 7 | 15 | MF | (Poland) | Jakub Moder | 2 | 0 | 0 | 2 |
| 10 | 6 | MF | (Sweden) | Jesper Karlström | 1 | 0 | 0 | 1 |
| 10 | 6 | MF | (Croatia) | Karlo Muhar | 0 | 1 | 0 | 1 |
| 10 | 9 | FW | (Sweden) | Mikael Ishak | 1 | 0 | 0 | 1 |
| 10 | 18 | DF | (Poland) | Bartosz Salamon | 1 | 0 | 0 | 1 |
| 10 | 21 | MF | (Poland) | Michał Skóraś | 1 | 0 | 0 | 1 |
| 10 | 37 | DF | (Slovakia) | Ľubomír Šatka | 1 | 0 | 0 | 1 |
| 10 | 51 | FW | (Poland) | Hubert Sobol | 1 | 0 | 0 | 1 |
| TOTALS | | | | | 25 | 4 | 15 | 44 |

=== Clean sheets ===
As of end of 2020–21 season.

| Place | Number | Nation | Name | Ekstraklasa | Polish Cup | UEFA Europa League | Total |
|---|---|---|---|---|---|---|---|
| 1 | 1 | (Netherlands) | Mickey van der Hart | 6 | – | – | 6 |
| 1 | 35 | (Poland) | Filip Bednarek | 3 | 0 | 3 | 6 |
| 3 | 33 | (Croatia) | Marko Malenica | – | 0 | – | 0 |
| – | 31 | (Poland) | Krzysztof Bąkowski | – | – | – | – |
| TOTALS | | | | 9 | 0 | 3 | 12 |

=== Disciplinary record ===
As of end of 2020–21 season.

| Number | Position | Nation | Name | Ekstraklasa | | | Polish Cup | | | UEFA Europa League | | | Total | | |
| Number | Position | Nation | Name | Booked | (yellow card) (yellow-red card) | Sent off (straight red) | Booked | (yellow card) (yellow-red card) | Sent off (straight red) | Booked | (yellow card) (yellow-red card) | Sent off (straight red) | Booked | (yellow card) (yellow-red card) | Sent off (straight red) |
|---|---|---|---|---|---|---|---|---|---|---|---|---|---|---|---|
| 1 | GK | (Netherlands) | Mickey van der Hart | 0 | 0 | 0 | – | | | | | | 0 | 0 | 0 |
| 3 | DF | (Ukraine) | Vasyl Kravets | 7 | 0 | 0 | 1 | 0 | 0 | 1 | 0 | 0 | 9 | 0 | 0 |
| 4 | DF | (Norway) | Thomas Rogne | 1 | 0 | 0 | 0 | 0 | 0 | 0 | 0 | 0 | 1 | 0 | 0 |
| 6 | MF | (Sweden) | Jesper Karlström | 3 | 0 | 0 | 0 | 0 | 0 | – | | | 3 | 0 | 0 |
| 8 | MF | (Czech Republic) | Jan Sýkora | 1 | 0 | 0 | 1 | 0 | 0 | 0 | 0 | 0 | 2 | 0 | 0 |
| 9 | FW | (Sweden) | Mikael Ishak | 2 | 0 | 0 | 0 | 0 | 0 | 1 | 0 | 0 | 3 | 0 | 0 |
| 10 | MF | (Spain) | Dani Ramírez | 3 | 0 | 0 | 0 | 0 | 0 | 3 | 0 | 0 | 6 | 0 | 0 |
| 11 | MF | (Poland) | Filip Marchwiński | 3 | 0 | 0 | 1 | 0 | 0 | 1 | 0 | 0 | 5 | 0 | 0 |
| 13 | DF | (Poland) | Tomasz Dejewski | 0 | 0 | 0 | 0 | 0 | 0 | 0 | 0 | 0 | 0 | 0 | 0 |
| 14 | FW | (Georgia (country)) | Nika Kacharava | 0 | 0 | 0 | 0 | 0 | 0 | 1 | 0 | 0 | 1 | 0 | 0 |
| 16 | DF | (Croatia) | Antonio Milić | 4 | 0 | 0 | 1 | 0 | 0 | – | | | 5 | 0 | 0 |
| 17 | FW | (Poland) | Filip Wilak | – | | | | | | | | | 0 | 0 | 0 |
| 18 | DF | (Poland) | Bartosz Salamon | 2 | 0 | 0 | 1 | 0 | 0 | – | | | 3 | 0 | 0 |
| 19 | FW | (Poland) | Norbert Pacławski | 0 | 0 | 0 | 0 | 0 | 0 | – | | | 0 | 0 | 0 |
| 20 | FW | (United States) | Aron Jóhannsson | 0 | 0 | 0 | 0 | 0 | 0 | – | | | 0 | 0 | 0 |
| 21 | MF | (Poland) | Michał Skóraś | 3 | 0 | 0 | 0 | 0 | 0 | 1 | 0 | 0 | 4 | 0 | 0 |
| 23 | FW | (Poland) | Filip Szymczak | 0 | 0 | 0 | 0 | 0 | 0 | 0 | 0 | 0 | 0 | 0 | 0 |
| 25 | MF | (Portugal) | Pedro Tiba | 2 | 0 | 0 | 1 | 0 | 0 | 0 | 0 | 0 | 3 | 0 | 0 |
| 27 | DF | (Poland) | Tymoteusz Puchacz | 5 | 0 | 0 | 2 | 0 | 0 | 0 | 0 | 0 | 7 | 0 | 0 |
| 28 | DF | (Poland) | Filip Borowski | – | | | 0 | 0 | 0 | – | | | 0 | 0 | 0 |
| 30 | MF | (Georgia (country)) | Nika Kvekveskiri | 1 | 0 | 0 | 0 | 0 | 0 | – | | | 1 | 0 | 0 |
| 31 | GK | (Poland) | Krzysztof Bąkowski | – | | | | | | | | | 0 | 0 | 0 |
| 34 | MF | (Poland) | Tymoteusz Klupś | – | | | 0 | 0 | 0 | – | | | 0 | 0 | 0 |
| 35 | GK | (Poland) | Filip Bednarek | 0 | 0 | 0 | 0 | 0 | 0 | 0 | 0 | 0 | 0 | 0 | 0 |
| 37 | DF | (Slovakia) | Ľubomír Šatka | 1 | 0 | 0 | 0 | 0 | 0 | 1 | 1 | 0 | 2 | 1 | 0 |
| 38 | MF | (Poland) | Jakub Kamiński | 4 | 0 | 0 | 0 | 0 | 0 | 1 | 0 | 0 | 5 | 0 | 0 |
| 43 | MF | (Poland) | Antoni Kozubal | 0 | 0 | 0 | – | | | | | | 0 | 0 | 0 |
| 44 | DF | (Poland) | Alan Czerwiński | 4 | 0 | 0 | 0 | 0 | 0 | 0 | 0 | 0 | 4 | 0 | 0 |
| 74 | DF | (Poland) | Krystian Palacz | 0 | 0 | 0 | – | | | | | | 0 | 0 | 0 |
Players who appeared for Lech and left the club during the season:
| 2 | DF | (Poland) | Robert Gumny | 0 | 0 | 0 | 0 | 0 | 0 | 0 | 0 | 0 | 0 | 0 | 0 |
| 5 | DF | (Serbia) | Đorđe Crnomarković | 3 | 0 | 0 | 0 | 0 | 0 | 1 | 1 | 0 | 4 | 1 | 0 |
| 6 | MF | (Croatia) | Karlo Muhar | 1 | 0 | 0 | 1 | 0 | 0 | 2 | 0 | 0 | 4 | 0 | 0 |
| 7 | MF | (Poland) | Kamil Jóźwiak | 0 | 0 | 0 | 0 | 0 | 0 | 0 | 0 | 0 | 0 | 0 | 0 |
| 15 | MF | (Poland) | Jakub Moder | 3 | 0 | 0 | 1 | 0 | 0 | 0 | 0 | 0 | 4 | 0 | 0 |
| 22 | DF | (Ukraine) | Volodymyr Kostevych | – | | | | | | | | | 0 | 0 | 0 |
| 29 | FW | (Israel) | Mohammed Awaed | 0 | 0 | 0 | 0 | 0 | 0 | 0 | 0 | 0 | 0 | 0 | 0 |
| 33 | GK | (Croatia) | Marko Malenica | – | | | 0 | 0 | 0 | – | | | 0 | 0 | 0 |
| 40 | DF | (Poland) | Jakub Niewiadomski | – | | | 0 | 0 | 0 | – | | | 0 | 0 | 0 |
| 51 | FW | (Poland) | Hubert Sobol | 0 | 0 | 0 | – | | | | | | 0 | 0 | 0 |
| 91 | DF | (Ukraine) | Bohdan Butko | 0 | 0 | 0 | – | | | 1 | 0 | 0 | 1 | 0 | 0 |
| TOTALS | | | | 52 | 0 | 0 | 10 | 0 | 0 | 14 | 2 | 0 | 76 | 2 | 0 |

=== Home attendances ===
| | Matches | Total attendances | Average attendance | Highest attendance | Lowest attendance |
|---|---|---|---|---|---|
| Ekstraklasa | 15 | 30,662 | 10,221 | 17,546 | 4,890 |
| Polish Cup | 1 | 0 | 0 | 0 | 0 |
| UEFA Europa League | 4 | 0 | 0 | 0 | 0 |
| Total | 20 | 30,662 | 10,221 | 17,546 | 4,890 |
