= Krystian Palacz =

Polish footballer (born 2003)

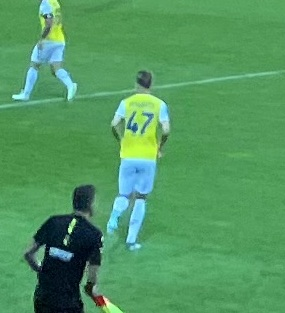
- Palacz in 2024 with Motor Lublin

Personal information
- Full name: Krystian Palacz
- Date of birth: 19 July 2003 (age 23)
- Place of birth: Poznań, Poland
- Height: 1.80 m (5 ft 11 in)
- Position: Left-back

Team information
- Current team: Odra Opole
- Number: 25

Youth career
- 2011–2020: Lech Poznań

Senior career*
Years	Team	Apps	(Gls)
2020–2023	Lech Poznań II	58	(4)
2021–2023	Lech Poznań	3	(0)
2023	→ Sandecja Nowy Sącz (loan)	10	(0)
2023–2026	Motor Lublin	46	(1)
2026–	Odra Opole	11	(0)

International career
2021	Poland U19	2	(0)
2021	Poland U20	1	(0)
2023	Poland U21	1	(0)
- * Club domestic league appearances and goals as of 08:36, 27 May 2026 (UTC)

Krystian Palacz (born 19 July 2003) is a Polish professional footballer who plays as a left-back for I liga club Odra Opole.

== Career ==
=== Youth career ===
Palacz spent his entire youth career in Lech Poznań.

=== Lech Poznań ===
Palacz debuted for Lech Poznań II on 8 August 2020, in a Polish Cup 3–2 home victory over Elana Toruń. He scored his first goal in his senior career over a year later, in a 3–2 victory against Chojniczanka Chojnice, which took place on 16 October of the following year.

==== Loan to Sandecja Nowy Sącz ====
On 27 February 2023, his loan to the I liga side Sandecja Nowy Sącz on a half-year deal was announced. There was also a provision added to his contract that allows it to be prolonged for a further year. Palacz made his debut in a 2–3 away loss with GKS Tychy on 19 March 2023.

=== Motor Lublin ===
On 3 July 2023, Palacz's move to I liga side Motor Lublin on a three-year deal was announced. After being assigned a squad number 47, he debuted in his new club in a 1–0 cup win over his former club, Lech II. He scored his first goal for Motor over six months later, on 28 February of the following year, in a 1–2 away victory over Podbeskidzie Bielsko-Biała. Throughout that season, he made 26 appearances across all competitions, 22 of them as a starter.

=== Odra Opole ===
On 10 February 2026, Palacz signed for second-tier side Odra Opole on a two-and-a-half-year deal, with an option for a further year.

== Career statistics ==
As of match played 24 May 2026

Appearances and goals by club, season and competition
Club	Season	League			Polish Cup		Europe		Other		Total	
Club	Season	Division	Apps	Goals	Apps	Goals	Apps	Goals	Apps	Goals	Apps	Goals
Lech Poznań II	2020–21	II liga	12	0	1	0	—		—		13	0
Lech Poznań II	2021–22	II liga	28	1	2	0	—		—		30	1
Lech Poznań II	2022–23	II liga	18	3	1	0	—		—		19	3
Lech Poznań II	Total		58	4	4	0	—		—		62	4
Lech Poznań	2020–21	Ekstraklasa	3	0	0	0	—		—		3	0
Lech Poznań	2021–22	Ekstraklasa	0	0	0	0	—		—		0	0
Lech Poznań	Total		3	0	0	0	—		—		3	0
Sandecja Nowy Sącz (loan)	2022–23	I liga	10	0	—		—		—		10	0
Motor Lublin	2023–24	I liga	23	1	2	0	—		1 (Note: Appearance in I liga promotion play-offs)	0	26	1
Motor Lublin	2024–25	Ekstraklasa	16	0	0	0	—		—		16	0
Motor Lublin	2025–26	Ekstraklasa	6	0	1	0	—		—		7	0
Motor Lublin	Total		45	1	3	0	—		1	0	49	1
Odra Opole	2025–26	I liga	11	0	—		—		—		11	0
Career total			127	5	7	0	—		1	0	135	5
