= Jan Sýkora =

Czech footballer

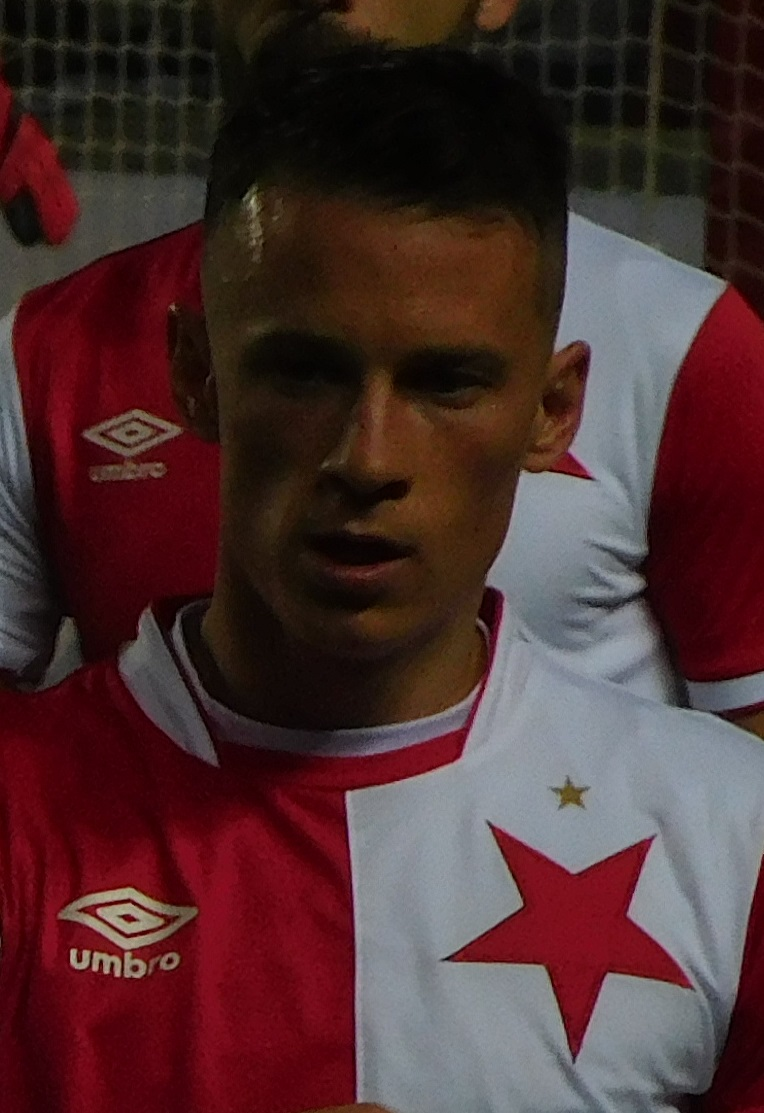
- Sýkora with Slavia Prague in 2018

Personal information
- Date of birth: 29 December 1993 (age 32)
- Place of birth: Plzeň, Czech Republic
- Height: 1.71 m (5 ft 7 in)
- Position: Midfielder

Youth career
- FC Švihov
- Přeštice
- Viktoria Plzeň

Senior career*
Years	Team	Apps	(Gls)
2011–2012	Sparta Prague B	23	(3)
2012–2015	Sparta Prague	0	(0)
2014–2015	→ Brno (loan)	26	(4)
2015–2016	Slovan Liberec	34	(1)
2017–2020	Slavia Prague	40	(5)
2019	→ Slovan Liberec (loan)	8	(1)
2019–2020	→ Jablonec (loan)	29	(8)
2020–2022	Lech Poznań	26	(0)
2020–2021	Lech Poznań II	3	(3)
2021–2022	→ Viktoria Plzeň (loan)	29	(4)
2022–2025	Viktoria Plzeň	36	(2)
2025	Sigma Olomouc	8	(0)
Total		262	(28)

International career
2010	Czech Republic U17	3	(1)
2011	Czech Republic U18	4	(0)
2011–2012	Czech Republic U19	13	(1)
2013	Czech Republic U20	1	(0)
2014	Czech Republic U21	2	(0)
2016–2022	Czech Republic	14	(4)
- * Club domestic league appearances and goals

Jan Sýkora (born 29 December 1993) is a Czech former professional footballer who played as a midfielder.

== Club career ==
Sýkora began his professional career at Sparta Prague, but failed to make a league appearance for their first team. He also spent time on loan at Zbrojovka Brno before transferring to Slovan Liberec in 2015.

On 15 September 2016, Sýkora scored the fastest ever goal of UEFA Europa League, finding the net after just 10.69 seconds in Liberec's group stage match against Qarabağ FK. In total, he made 34 league appearances for Liberec, scoring one goal.

=== Slavia Prague and loan to Slovan Liberec ===
After a long battle for his signature between Slavia Prague and Viktoria Plzeň, the two frontrunners for the league title at the time, Sýkora signed for the former in January 2017. On 22 November 2018, Sýkora signed a new contract with Slavia until 2022. In February 2019, he returned to Slovan Liberec on loan until the end of the season.

=== Lech Poznań ===
On 24 August 2020, Sýkora signed a four-year contract with Polish Ekstraklasa football club Lech Poznań. He debuted six days later during league match against Wisła Płock.

=== Viktoria Plzeň ===
On 6 July 2022, Sýkora signed a three-year contract with Czech First League side Viktoria Plzeň.

=== Sigma Olomouc ===
On 4 January 2025, Sýkora signed a contract with Sigma Olomouc until the end of the season with two-year option.

== International career ==
In August 2016, Sýkora got his first call-up to the Czech Republic national football team for a friendly match against Armenia and 2018 FIFA World Cup qualification match against Northern Ireland. He debuted against the former opponent on 31 August. In November 2017, Sýkora scored his first international goal in a 2–1 victory against Iceland.

== Career statistics ==
=== Club ===
Appearances and goals by club, season and competition
Club	Season	League			National cup (Note: Includes Czech Cup, Polish Cup)		Europe		Other		Total	
Club	Season	Division	Apps	Goals	Apps	Goals	Apps	Goals	Apps	Goals	Apps	Goals
Sparta Prague B	2011–12	Czech National Football League	23	3	—		—		—		23	3
Sparta Prague	2011–12	Czech First League	0	0	1	0	0	0	—		1	0
Zbrojovka Brno	2014–15	Czech First League	26	4	0	0	—		—		26	4
Slovan Liberec	2015–16	Czech First League	21	1	4	0	5 (Note: Appearances in UEFA Europa League)	0	—		30	1
Slovan Liberec	2016–17	Czech First League	13	0	0	0	9	4	—		22	4
Slovan Liberec	Total		34	1	4	0	14	4	—		52	5
Slavia Prague	2016–17	Czech First League	11	2	1	0	0	0	—		12	2
Slavia Prague	2017–18	Czech First League	17	2	3	1	7 (Note: Two appearances in UEFA Champions League, five appearances in UEFA Europa League)	0	—		27	3
Slavia Prague	2018–19	Czech First League	12	1	1	1	4 (Note: Two appearances in UEFA Champions League, two appearances in UEFA Europa League)	0	—		17	2
Slavia Prague	Total		40	5	5	2	11	0	—		56	7
Slovan Liberec (loan)	2018–19	Czech First League	8	1	1	1	—		—		9	2
Jablonec (loan)	2019–20	Czech First League	29	8	3	0	2	0	—		34	8
Lech Poznań	2020–21	Ekstraklasa	22	0	3	0	7	1	—		32	1
Lech Poznań	2021–22	Ekstraklasa	4	0	0	0	—		—		4	0
Lech Poznań	Total		26	0	3	0	7	1	—		36	1
Viktoria Plzeň (loan)	2021–22	Czech First League	29	4	1	0	—		—		30	4
Viktoria Plzeň	2022–23	Czech First League	21	2	0	0	8 (Note: Appearances in UEFA Champions League)	3	—		29	5
Viktoria Plzeň	2023–24	Czech First League	15	0	3	1	7 (Note: Appearances in UEFA Europa Conference League)	0	—		25	1
Viktoria Plzeň	2024–25	Czech First League	0	0	0	0	0	0	—		0	0
Viktoria Plzeň	Total		36	2	3	1	15	3	—		54	6
Sigma Olomouc	2024–25	Czech First League	8	0	1	0	—		—		9	0
Career total			259	28	22	4	49	8	—		330	40

=== International ===
Appearances and goals by national team and year
National team	Year	Apps	Goals
Czech Republic
Czech Republic	2016	3	0
Czech Republic	2017	4	1
Czech Republic	2018	3	0
Czech Republic	2021	2	3
Czech Republic	2022	2	0
Total		14	4

Scores and results list Czech Republic's goal tally first, score column indicates score after each Sýkora goal.

List of international goals scored by Jan Sýkora
No.	Date	Venue	Opponent	Score	Result	Competition
1	8 November 2017	Abdullah bin Khalifa Stadium, Doha, Qatar	Iceland	2–0	2–1	Friendly
2	11 November 2021	Andrův stadion, Olomouc, Czech Republic	Kuwait	6–0	7–0	Friendly
3	11 November 2021	Andrův stadion, Olomouc, Czech Republic	Kuwait	7–0	7–0	Friendly
4	16 November 2021	Stadion Letná, Prague, Qatar	Estonia	2–0	2–0	2022 FIFA World Cup qualification

== Honours ==
Slavia Prague

- Czech First League: 2016–17, 2018–19
- Czech Cup: 2017–18, 2018–19

Viktoria Plzeň

- Czech First League: 2021–22

Lech Poznań

- Ekstraklasa: 2021–22
