= Michał Skóraś =

Polish footballer (born 2000)

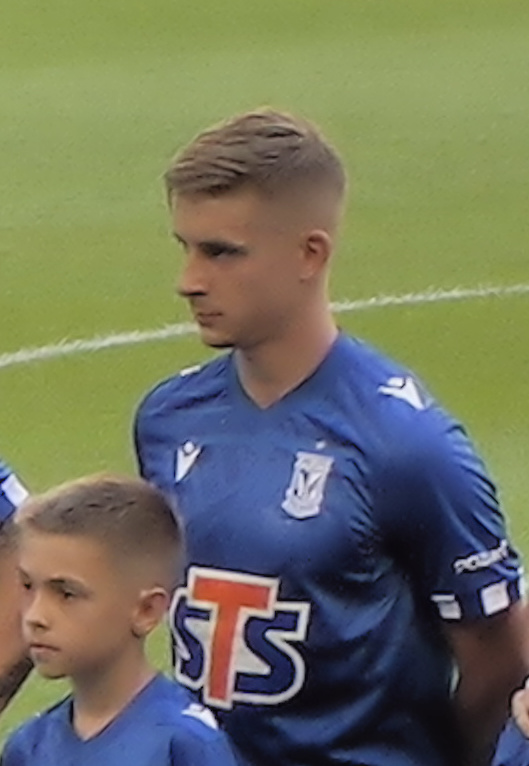
- Skóraś lining up for Lech Poznań in 2022

Personal information
- Full name: Michał Krzysztof Skóraś
- Date of birth: 15 February 2000 (age 26)
- Place of birth: Jastrzębie-Zdrój, Poland
- Height: 1.72 m (5 ft 8 in)
- Positions: Winger; wing-back

Team information
- Current team: Lens
- Number: 22

Youth career
- –2014: MOSiR Jastrzębie-Zdrój
- 2015–2017: Lech Poznań

Senior career*
Years	Team	Apps	(Gls)
2017–2022	Lech Poznań II	22	(4)
2018–2023	Lech Poznań	92	(13)
2018–2019	→ Bruk-Bet Termalica (loan)	27	(1)
2019	→ Raków Częstochowa (loan)	15	(1)
2023–2025	Club Brugge	62	(2)
2025–2026	Gent	31	(2)
2026–	Lens	8	(0)

International career^{‡}
2015–2016	Poland U16	7	(2)
2016–2017	Poland U17	10	(2)
2017–2018	Poland U18	5	(1)
2018	Poland U19	6	(2)
2019	Poland U20	10	(0)
2020–2022	Poland U21	10	(4)
2022–	Poland	18	(0)
- * Club domestic league appearances and goals as of 13:42, 10 November 2026 (UTC) ‡ National team caps and goals as of 23:30, 17 November 2026 (UTC)

Michał Krzysztof Skóraś (born 15 February 2000) is a Polish professional footballer who plays as a winger or wing-back for Ligue 1 club Lens and the Poland national team.

== Club career ==
On 20 March 2021, Skóraś scored his first goal for Lech Poznań against Jagiellonia Białystok.

In the 2022–23 season, Skóraś represented Lech Poznań in the 2022–23 UEFA Europa Conference League, reaching the quarter-finals. The same year on 26 April, he signed a four-year contract with Belgium's Club Brugge, valid from July 2023, for a transfer fee reported to be €6 million.

On 6 September 2025, Skóras joined fellow Belgian side Gent on a three-year contract for a reported fee of €3 million. Skóraś scored in his first game for Gent on 14 September 2025 during an away match against Royal Antwerp.

On 14 July 2026, Skóras signed a five-year contract with Lens in France.

== International career ==
Having made over 40 appearances for the Poland youth national teams, Skóraś earned his first cap for the senior squad on 22 September 2022, coming on as a substitute in the 68th minute of a 2–0 UEFA Nations League defeat to the Netherlands. In November 2022, he was named in the 26-man squad for the 2022 FIFA World Cup. He made his only appearance during the tournament in a 2–0 group stage loss to Argentina on 30 November, playing the entirety of the second half.

On 7 June 2024, Skóraś was selected in the final squad for UEFA Euro 2024 in Germany.

== Career statistics ==
=== Club ===
As of match played 8 November 2026

Appearances and goals by club, season and competition
Club	Season	League			National cup (Note: Includes Polish Cup, Belgian Cup)		Europe		Other		Total	
Club	Season	Division	Apps	Goals	Apps	Goals	Apps	Goals	Apps	Goals	Apps	Goals
Lech Poznań II	2017–18	III liga, group II	14	0	—		—		—		14	0
Lech Poznań II	2019–20	II liga	5	1	—		—		—		5	1
Lech Poznań II	2020–21	II liga	1	2	—		—		—		1	2
Lech Poznań II	2021–22	II liga	2	1	0	0	—		—		2	1
Lech Poznań II	Total		22	4	0	0	—		—		22	4
Bruk-Bet Termalica (loan)	2018–19	I liga	27	1	1	0	—		—		28	1
Raków Częstochowa (loan)	2019–20	Ekstraklasa	15	1	2	0	—		—		17	1
Lech Poznań	2019–20	Ekstraklasa	5	0	0	0	—		—		5	0
Lech Poznań	2020–21	Ekstraklasa	26	2	3	0	9 (Note: Appearances in UEFA Europa League)	1	—		38	3
Lech Poznań	2021–22	Ekstraklasa	29	2	6	0	—		—		35	2
Lech Poznań	2022–23	Ekstraklasa	32	9	0	0	20 (Note: Two appearances in UEFA Champions League, eighteen appearances and seven goals in UEFA Europa Conference League)	7	1 (Note: Appearance in Polish Super Cup)	0	53	16
Lech Poznań	Total		92	13	9	0	29	8	1	0	131	21
Club Brugge	2023–24	Belgian Pro League	28	2	4	0	15 (Note: Appearances in UEFA Europa Conference League)	2	—		47	4
Club Brugge	2024–25	Belgian Pro League	32	0	4	2	5 (Note: Appearances in UEFA Champions League)	0	0	0	41	2
Club Brugge	2025–26	Belgian Pro League	2	0	—		0	0	0	0	2	0
Club Brugge	Total		62	2	8	2	20	2	0	0	90	6
Gent	2025–26	Belgian Pro League	31	2	3	0	—		—		34	2
Lens	2026–27	Ligue 1	8	0	0	0	4	0	1 (Note: Appearance in Trophée des Champions)	0	13	0
Career total			257	23	23	2	53	10	2	0	335	35

=== International ===
As of match played 17 November 2026

Appearances and goals by national team and year
National team	Year	Apps	Goals
Poland
Poland	2022	2	0
Poland	2023	4	0
Poland	2024	3	0
Poland	2025	4	0
Poland	2026	5	0
Total		18	0

== Honours ==
Lech Poznań

- Ekstraklasa: 2021–22

Club Brugge

- Belgian Pro League: 2023–24
- Belgian Cup: 2024–25

Lens

- Trophée des Champions: 2026

Individual

- Ekstraklasa Young Player of the Month: April 2022
