= Samuel Corral =

Spanish footballer

Samu Corral
Personal information
- Full name: Samuel Corral Valero
- Date of birth: 3 April 1992 (age 34)
- Place of birth: Granada, Spain
- Height: 1.84 m (6 ft 1/2 in)
- Position: Forward

Team information
- Current team: Atlético Paso
- Number: 14

Youth career
- 2007–2010: Granada 74
- 2010–2011: Guadix

Senior career*
Years	Team	Apps	(Gls)
2011	Guadix	9	(3)
2011–2012	Granada B	12	(3)
2012–2014	Atarfe Industrial	43	(9)
2014–2015	Maracena	20	(10)
2015	Loja	11	(5)
2016–2017	El Ejido	55	(21)
2017–2019	El Ejido	43	(14)
2019–2020	Talavera	17	(6)
2020–2022	ŁKS Łódź	44	(7)
2022–2024	Linares Deportivo	59	(10)
2024–	Atlético Paso	5	(0)
- * Club domestic league appearances and goals as of 29 September 2024

Samuel Corral Valero (born 3 April 1992) is a Spanish professional footballer who plays for Atlético Paso as a forward.

== Club career ==
Born in Granada, Corral joined the youth academy of CP Granada 74 in 2008. In 2010–11, he made his senior debut, representing Guadix CF in Primera Andaluza. In the following years, he went on to represent Granada CF B, Atarfe Industrial CF, UD Maracena, Loja CD and CD El Ejido in the Tercera División. He won promotion to Segunda División B with El Ejido during the 2015–16 season.

On 9 July 2019, Corral signed with CF Talavera de la Reina in Segunda B. On 4 January 2020, he moved abroad and joined Polish Ekstraklasa club ŁKS Łódź on a contract running until 30 June 2022.

== Club statistics ==
As of match played on 21 August 2020.

Club	Season	League			Cup		Other		Total	
Club	Season	Division	Apps	Goals	Apps	Goals	Apps	Goals	Apps	Goals
Guadix	2010–11	Primera Andaluza	9	3	—		—		9	3
Granada B	2011–12	Primera Andaluza	12	3	—		—		12	3
Atarfe Industrial	2012–13	Tercera División	27	6	—		—		27	6
Atarfe Industrial	2013–14	Tercera División	16	3	—		—		16	3
Atarfe Industrial	Total		43	9	—		—		43	9
Maracena	2014–15	Tercera División	20	10	—		—		20	10
Loja	2014–15	Tercera División	11	5	—		—		11	5
El Ejido	2015–16	Tercera División	27	12	—		5 (Note: Appearances in Promotion Play-offs)	2	32	14
El Ejido	2016–17	Segunda División B	28	8	—		—		28	8
El Ejido	2017–18	Segunda División B	15	7	—		—		15	7
El Ejido	2018–19	Segunda División B	28	7	—		—		28	7
El Ejido	Total		98	34	—		5	2	103	36
Talavera	2019–20	Segunda División B	17	6	—		—		17	6
ŁKS Łódź	2019–20	Ekstraklasa	12	3	0	0	—		12	3
Career total			222	73	0	0	5	2	227	75
