= Marcin Stefanik =

Polish footballer

Personal information
- Full name: Marcin Stefanik
- Date of birth: 25 June 1987 (age 39)
- Place of birth: Dębica, Poland
- Height: 1.83 m (6 ft 0 in)
- Position: Midfielder

Senior career*
Years	Team	Apps	(Gls)
2005–2006	Igloopol Dębica		
2006	KKS Koluszki		
2006	Widzew Łódź	1	(0)
2007	Concordia Piotrków		
2007–2009	Kolejarz Stróże	51	(7)
2009–2010	Sandecja Nowy Sącz	17	(2)
2010–2014	Kolejarz Stróże	121	(9)
2014–2017	Siarka Tarnobrzeg	90	(21)
2017–2021	Puszcza Niepołomice	103	(10)
2021–2023	Siarka Tarnobrzeg	61	(20)
2023–2025	Igloopol Dębica	59	(23)
- * Club domestic league appearances and goals

Marcin Stefanik (born 25 June 1987) is a Polish former professional footballer who played as a midfielder.

== Career ==
In the summer of 2010, he joined Kolejarz Stróże.

== Honours ==
Siarka Tarnobrzeg

- III liga, group IV: 2021–22

Igloopol Dębica

- Polish Cup (Rzeszów-Dębica regionals): 2023–24
