= Norbert Pacławski =

Polish footballer (born 2004)

Personal information
- Full name: Norbert Pacławski
- Date of birth: 19 February 2004 (age 22)
- Place of birth: Rzeszów, Poland
- Height: 1.87 m (6 ft 2 in)
- Position: Forward

Team information
- Current team: Mazur Radzymin
- Number: 15

Youth career
- Orzełek Przeworsk
- 2017–2020: Lech Poznań

Senior career*
Years	Team	Apps	(Gls)
2020–2025	Lech Poznań II	102	(11)
2021–2023	Lech Poznań	2	(0)
2025	Pogoń Grodzisk Mazowiecki	7	(0)
2025	Sokół Kolbuszowa Dolna	3	(0)
2026–	Mazur Radzymin	15	(8)

International career
2019	Poland U15	2	(0)
2019–2020	Poland U16	7	(4)
2022	Poland U18	2	(0)
- * Club domestic league appearances and goals as of 17:22, 30 June 2026 (UTC)

Norbert Pacławski (born 19 February 2004) is a Polish professional footballer who plays as a forward for regional league club Mazur Radzymin.

== Career statistics ==
As of match played 14 June 2026

Appearances and goals by club, season and competition
Club	Season	League			Polish Cup		Europe		Other		Total	
Club	Season	Division	Apps	Goals	Apps	Goals	Apps	Goals	Apps	Goals	Apps	Goals
Lech Poznań II	2020–21	II liga	13	0	1	1	—		—		14	1
Lech Poznań II	2021–22	II liga	27	4	0	0	—		—		27	4
Lech Poznań II	2022–23	II liga	26	3	0	0	—		—		26	3
Lech Poznań II	2023–24	II liga	28	4	0	0	—		—		28	4
Lech Poznań II	2024–25	III liga, group II	8	0	1	0	—		—		9	0
Lech Poznań II	Total		102	11	2	1	—		—		104	12
Lech Poznań	2020–21	Ekstraklasa	2	0	1	0	—		—		3	0
Lech Poznań	2021–22	Ekstraklasa	0	0	2	0	—		—		2	0
Lech Poznań	2023–24	Ekstraklasa	0	0	1	0	0	0	—		1	0
Lech Poznań	Total		2	0	4	0	0	0	—		6	0
Pogoń Grodzisk Mazowiecki	2024–25	II liga	7	0	—		—		—		7	0
Sokół Kolbuszowa Dolna	2025–26	III liga, group IV	3	0	—		—		—		3	0
Mazur Radzymin	2025–26	Regional league	15	8	—		—		—		15	8
Career total			129	19	6	1	0	0	—		135	20
