= Stadion Ludowy =

Football stadium in Sosnowiec, Poland

Coordinates: 50°16′37.76″N 19°6′13.08″E

Sosnowiec People's Stadium
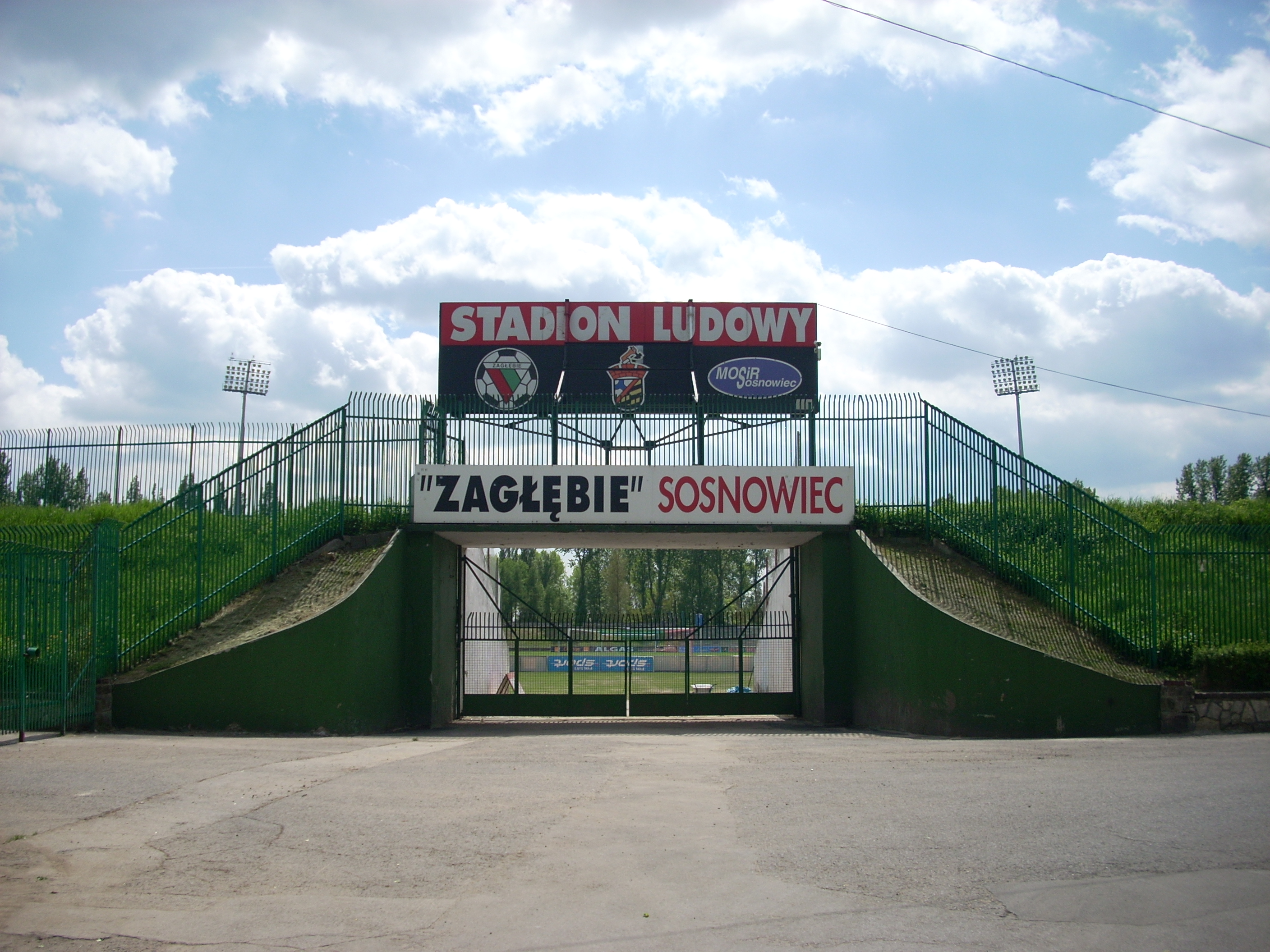
- Interactive map of Sosnowiec People's Stadium
- Location: ul. Kresowa 1 Sosnowiec, Poland
- Capacity: 7,500 (5,841 seats)
- Surface: Grass
- Field size: 105 x 68 m

Construction
- Built: 1956

Tenant
- Zagłębie Sosnowiec

The Sosnowiec People's Stadium (Polish: Stadion Ludowy w Sosnowcu) is a multi-use stadium in Sosnowiec, Poland. It is currently used mostly for football matches and serves as the training ground of Zagłębie Sosnowiec. The stadium has a capacity of 7,500 people.

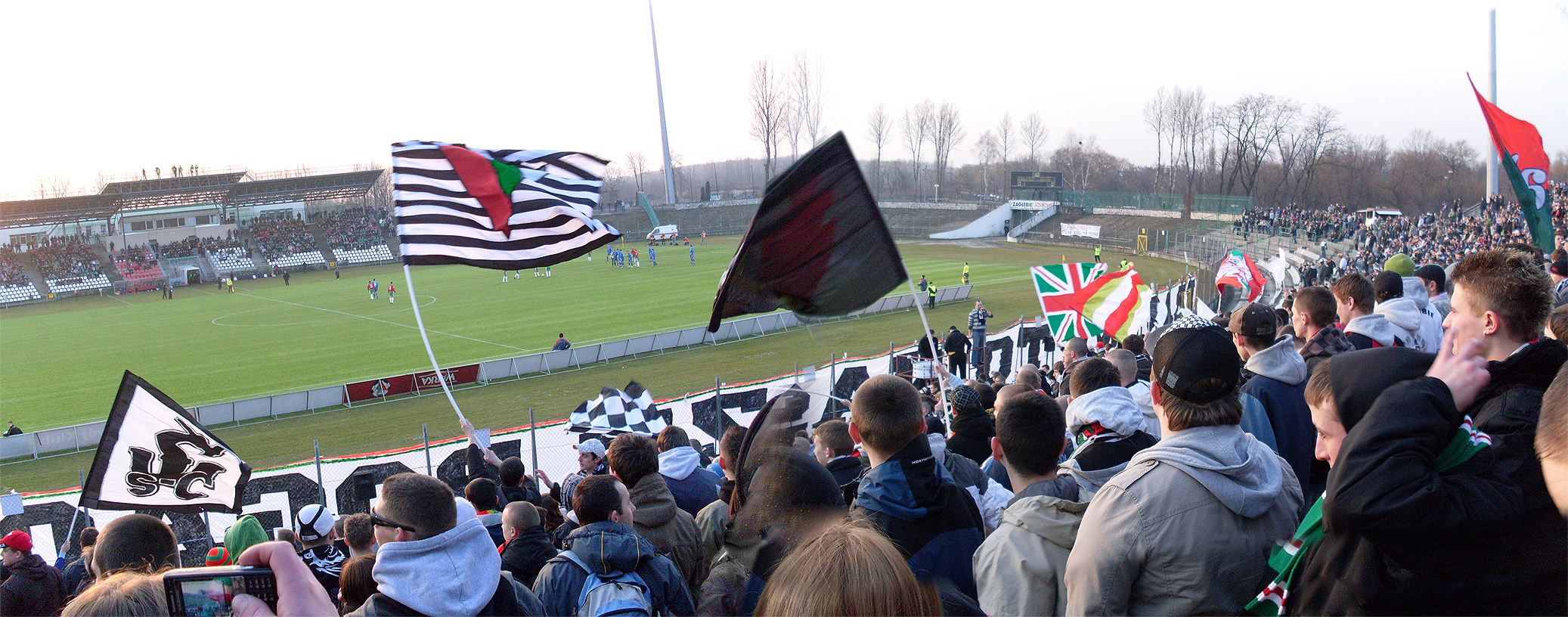
Stadion Ludowy
