= Niels Frederiksen =

Danish football manager (born 1970)

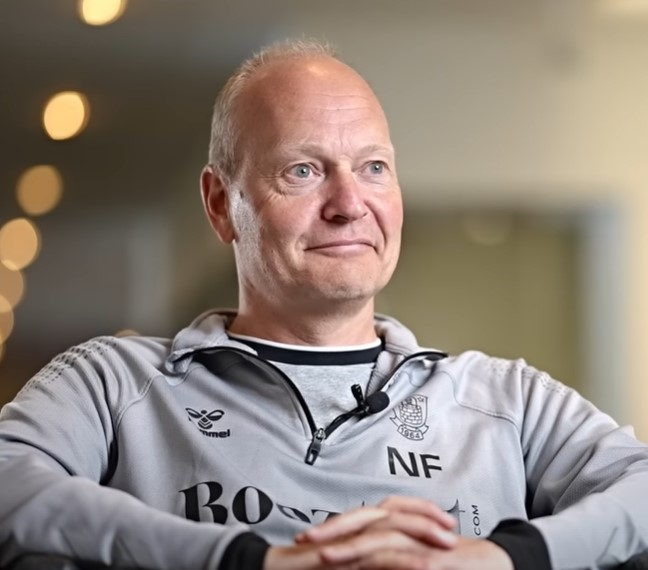
- Frederiksen in 2022 as Brøndby manager

Personal information
- Full name: Niels Frederiksen
- Date of birth: 5 November 1970 (age 56)
- Place of birth: Odense, Denmark

Team information
- Current team: Lech Poznań (manager)

Managerial career
- Years: Team
- 2009–2013: Lyngby
- 2013–2015: Esbjerg
- 2015–2019: Denmark U21
- 2019–2022: Brøndby
- 2024–: Lech Poznań

Niels Frederiksen (Danish pronunciation: [ˈne̝ls ˈfʁeðˀʁeksn̩, - ˈfʁæðˀʁæksn̩]; born 5 November 1970) is a Danish professional football manager who is the head coach of Polish Ekstraklasa club Lech Poznań.

Frederiksen began his career as a head coach at Lyngby Boldklub in 2009 after having spent almost two decades as a youth coach in B 1913, B.93, and Lyngby. He remained in the post as head coach, and later manager, for the club for nearly four years. He then coached Esbjerg, leading them to a fifth place in the domestic league as well as their best European result ever: the Europa League round of 32 where the club was knocked out by Fiorentina. He was relieved of his duties in 2015. He was later put in charge of the Denmark national under-21 team, before being appointed head coach of Brøndby in June 2019, replacing Alexander Zorniger. He would go on to lead the club to their first Danish Superliga title in 16 years in the 2020–21 season. In 2024, he joined Polish club Lech Poznań, where he won two Ekstraklasa titles in his first two seasons.

== Managerial career ==
=== B.93 ===
Frederiksen started coaching at age 20, coaching youth teams at B 1913 in his hometown Odense. Frederiksen's arrived in B.93 from Østerbro, Copenhagen in 1997, where he was put in charge of some youth divisions. Between 2000 and 2002, he was appointed coach of the under-16 team and followed the players as coach when these reached the under-18 team in 2003–04.

In 2005, Frederiksen was put in charge of the entire youth department of B.93, while he also worked as assistant coach to the first team which competed in the Danish 2nd Division (third highest division). In November 2005, he signed a contract as under-19 coach for Lyngby Boldklub, and he left B.93 in late 2005.

=== Lyngby ===
Frederiksen began coaching the Lyngby Boldklub under-17 and under-19 sides beginning 1 January 2006. During his first season, he led the under-19 team to a second place in the table in the national championship, while they reached third place in 2007. In February 2008, Frederiksen was promoted to the position of head of talent in Lyngby – the club's first since 2004 where Birger Jørgensen held the position. He also joined the board of the Lyngby Boldklub aktieselskab.

Lyngby Boldklub's first team competed in the Danish 1st Division (second highest division) in 2009, where the club's objective was promotion to the Danish Superliga. After a poor start to the season, head coach Henrik Larsen was sacked on 23 March 2009. On the same day, Frederiksen was promoted from head of talent to head coach for the first team. Lyngby ended the 2008–09 season in sixth place, 21 and 19 points, respectively, behind Herfølge Boldklub and Silkeborg IF who reached promotion. He continued coaching the first team during the 2009–10 season while managing an HR unit within Danske Bank where he had also become chief operating officer. Frederiksen and Lyngby Boldklub reached promotion during that season, after reaching second place in the table, only behind AC Horsens and ahead of FC Fredericia in third place.

After reaching promotion to the Superliga, Frederiksen signed a one-year contract extension with Lyngby on 1 July 2010. While working as head coach at the highest level, he took leave as COO in Danske Bank and would only do consulting assignments. During the 2010–11 season, Lyngby was engaged in a relegation battle but managed to avoid this in the final fixture of the season, on 29 May 2011 in a 2–0 home win over OB. The club ended in eighth place in the league table.

In early June 2011, Frederiksen became a full-time permanent employee in Lyngby. This happened after he signed a three-year contract extension, keeping him part of the club until June 2014. By 1 September 2011, Frederiksen was released from his employment obligations in the Danske Bank Group, and the following week he was appointed manager of Lyngby, where he was also put in charge of transfers. The same year, he received his UEFA Pro Licence.

=== Esbjerg fB ===
On 2 May 2013, Esbjerg fB announced that Frederiksen would succeed Jess Thorup as the club's head coach from the start of the 2013–14 Danish Superliga season. In his first season, he led Esbjerg to the round of 32 in the Europa League, where they lost 2–4 over two legs to Italian side Fiorentina. This came after advancing from the group stage in second place by beating Standard Liège (2–1; 2–1) and Elfsborg (2–1; 1–0), and losing two matches to group winners, Red Bull Salzburg (1–2; 0–3). Esbjerg had qualified to the group stage after winning 5–3 on aggregate over French club Saint-Étienne. In the domestic league, his first season was also successful, ending in a fifth-placed finish which qualified the club for contention in the 2014–15 Europa League second round.

In the following season, Esbjerg knocked out Kazakh side Kairat Almaty 2–1 on aggregate in the second qualifying round, before facing Polish club Ruch Chorzów in the third round. In the first leg, Esbjerg drew 0–0 away. However in the second leg, a last-minute goal by Łukasz Surma for Ruch Chorzów to make it 2–2 to win on away goals, ended Esbjerg's hopes of advancing in the tournament. In the domestic league, Esbjerg had sold some profiles such as Jakob Ankersen, Eddi Gomes and Martin Pušić during the winter transfer window, and partly due to this the club struggled against relegation. In the last fixture of the season, Esbjerg avoided relegation after a 2–1 win over relegation rivals, FC Vestsjælland.

On 10 August 2015, Frederiksen was dismissed by Esbjerg with the side placed last in the Danish Superliga table after four matches into the 2015–16 season, with chairman Søren Poulsen citing "lacking" domestic results as the reason behind the dismissal. Frederiksen was succeeded by Jonas Dal.

=== Denmark U21 ===
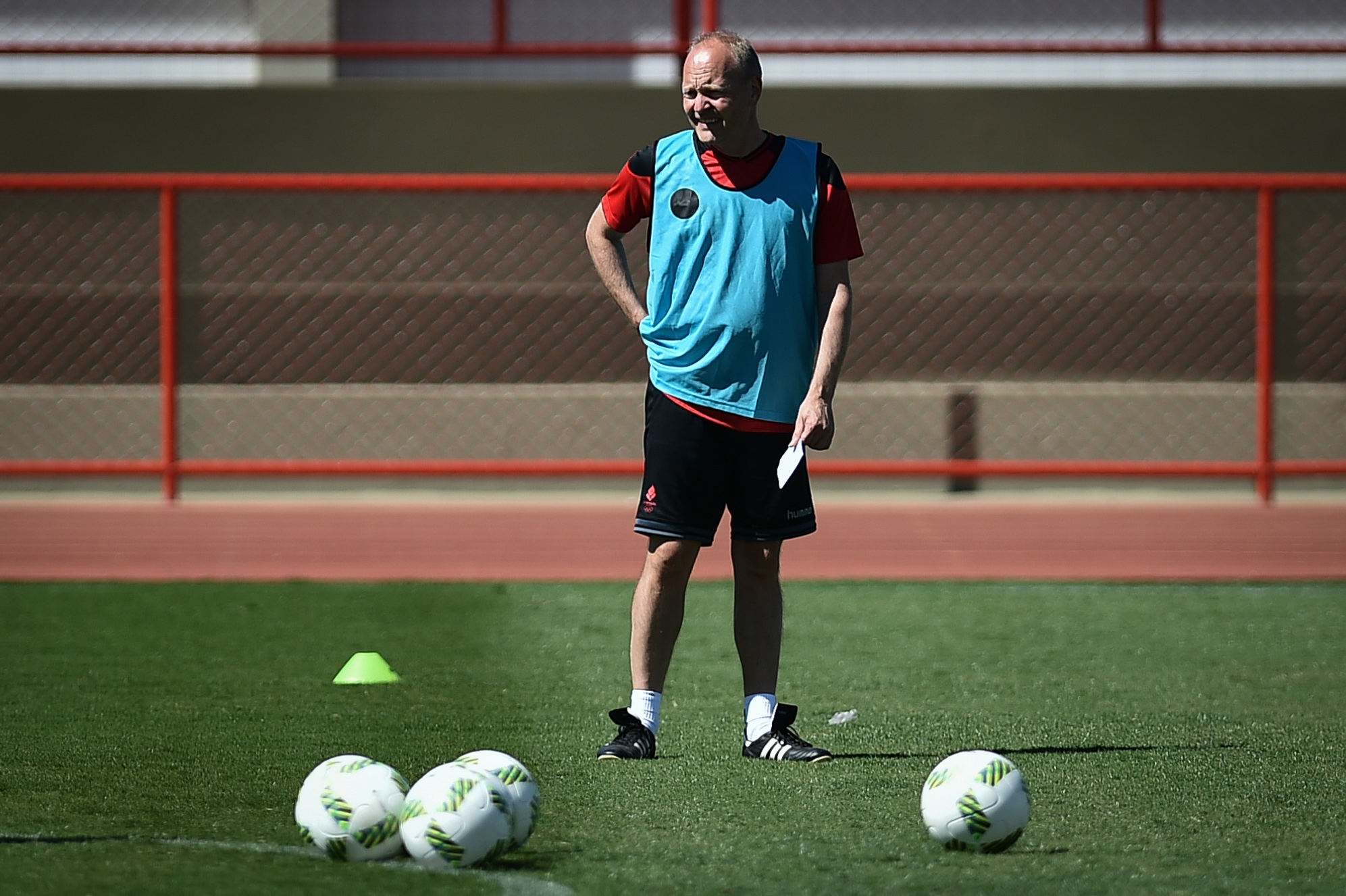
Frederiksen in 2017

In August 2015, Frederiksen was named manager of the Denmark under-21 team, signing a two-year contract. In his first game in charge, they lost 1–2 to Germany in a friendly at Stadion Lohmühle in Lübeck, Schleswig-Holstein. Under Frederiksen, Denmark qualified for the UEFA European Under-21 Championship in 2017 and 2019, where they were knocked out in the group stages, finishing third and second, respectively.

=== Brøndby ===
Frederiksen returned to club management at the beginning of the 2019–20 season with Brøndby IF, when the club announced him as their new head coach on 1 June. However, Frederiksen would have to lead the Denmark under-21 team through the 2019 UEFA European Under-21 Championship before starting in his new position. In Brøndby, he had a mixed start and the club suffered a string of poor results in September. This saw him change the formation from a 4–3–3 to a 3–5–2 in early October, which resulted in a derby win over FC Copenhagen. Frederiksen's defense consisted of Hjörtur Hermannsson, Andreas Maxsø and Sigurd Rosted, which neutralised Copenhagen-strikers Nicklas Bendtner and Michael Santos. After winning the subsequent league match 3-0 over Frederiksen's former club, Lyngby, he stated that the 3-5-2 was a system suited for his team's abilities.

In January 2020, sporting director Carsten V. Jensen sold key players Kamil Wilczek and Dominik Kaiser to Göztepe and Hannover 96, respectively, which brought forward Frederiksen's key strengths; the development of young players. The altering of the first-team meant that talents such as Morten Frendrup and Anis Ben Slimane began to play a larger role for the club in the spring of 2020.

Frederiksen had a strong start to the 2020–21 season with Brøndby, who won the first four matches including stoppage time wins over Nordsjælland and main rivals FC Copenhagen. At the winter break, the team were in joint first place of the league table alongside Midtjylland, but had been knocked out of the cup by second tier club Fremad Amager. With Frederiksen's contract expiring in June 2021, speculation arose on his contractual situation and whether his contract would be extended or not. He eventually signed an extension with Brøndby on 21 January 2021; a two-year deal running until June 2023. He led Brøndby to their first league title in 16 years, after beating Nordsjælland 2–0 on 24 May 2021, to secure the club's 11th championship.

Due to Brøndby's poor performance in the first half of the 2022–23 season, Frederiksen was dismissed on 14 November 2022, the day following the final game before the winter break, a 2–0 loss to Viborg.

=== Lech Poznań ===
On 14 May 2024, it was announced Frederiksen would take on his first managerial job abroad, when Polish Ekstraklasa club Lech Poznań revealed him as their new manager, starting from 1 July. He signed a two-year contract and replaced Mariusz Rumak at the start of the 2024–25 campaign.

Frederiksen's first six months in Poznań saw Lech enter the winter break as leaders, with a three-point advantage over Raków Częstochowa, but also an early Polish Cup exit after a first round loss to third-tier side Resovia. On 24 May 2025, Lech won 1–0 at home against Piast Gliwice to clinch their ninth league title. Two days later, Frederiksen was named the Ekstraklasa Coach of the Season.

Lech strengthened their side in the summer of 2025, with the signings of last season's Ekstraklasa Defender of the Season Mateusz Skrzypczak, winger Luis Palma and striker Yannick Agnero, among others, but also lost key figures such as Patrik Wålemark, Ali Gholizadeh and Radosław Murawski to long-term injuries.

Lech's 2025–26 campaign kicked off with losing the 2025 Polish Super Cup at home to Legia Warsaw on 13 July. After winning 8–1 on aggregate against Icelandic side Breiðablik, and losing the following match-ups against Red Star Belgrade and Genk, Frederiksen's Lech entered the UEFA Conference League league phase. On 3 October, Frederiksen oversaw Lech's 4–1 home victory over Austrian side Rapid Wien. This win was however followed by two away losses, a 1–2 defeat to Lincoln Red Imps from Gibraltar and a 2–3 loss to Spanish side Rayo Vallecano, despite leading the latter game 2–0 at half-time. Lech finished the league phase in 11th and entered the knockout phase play-offs. After eliminating KuPS, Lech ended their European campaign in the round of 16 after losing 3–4 on aggregate to Ukrainian side Shakhtar Donetsk. In the Polish Cup, Lech were eliminated in the quarter-finals by eventual winners Górnik Zabrze. On 16 May 2026, Lech won their second consecutive Ekstraklasa title after beating Radomiak Radom 3–1 away. Five days later, Frederiksen signed a new two-year contract with Lech until summer 2028. At the season's conclusion, he won the Ekstraklasa Coach of the Season award for the second year in a row.

In his third summer transfer window at Lech to prepare for the 2026–27 season, the club spent over €8 million in fees for several signings, including a permanent signing of Luis Palma for a club record fee, Ghanain defender Terry Yegbe from Metz, homegrown goalkeeper Mateusz Lis from Göztepe, Swedish midfielder Gustav Berggren from New York Red Bulls and Iranian forward Allahyar Sayyadmanesh, the latter joining on free transfer from Westerlo.

The club began their season with a 4–1 Polish Super Cup win over Górnik Zabrze on 16 July. Afterwards, Lech launched their European campaign on 21 July with a 4–1 win over Danish champions AGF in the UEFA Champions League second qualifying round. Eight days later, having lost the return home game 1–4 after extra-time, Lech were knocked out on penalties and dropped to the UEFA Europa League qualifying. They went on to qualify for the league phase after defeating Faroese side KÍ Klaksvík 6–0 on aggregate and Swiss club Thun 9–2 on aggregate. The first game against Thun on 20 August ended in a 7–0 win for Lech, their greatest win margin in any European competition.

== Manager profile ==
=== Tactics ===
Frederiksen is noted for his development of youth players, with examples including Andreas Christensen, Andreas Bjelland, Yussuf Poulsen and Christian Nørgaard in Lyngby, and Martin Braithwaite at Esbjerg. He has furthermore shown flexibility in regards to formations, employing a 3–4–3 formation at Denmark U21, but also utilising a classic 4–4–2. In Brøndby, Frederiksen started out employing a 4–3–3, but since adjusted this to a dynamic 3–5–2 with attacking wingbacks, Andreas Maxsø as the anchor in defense and a fast and more stationary centre forward as the main forwards. Frederiksen is a proponent of pressing, in what he has called a balanced press. This implies striking a balance between immediately attempting to win back possession high up the pitch, and falling back and regrouping in defence.

=== Influences ===
Frederiksen has cited his main influences inside football as José Mourinho "for his arrogance", Sir Alex Ferguson "for his long time success" and Jürgen Klopp, due to his development of young players and his tactics. Outside football, he has been inspired by Socrates and the 2011 film Moneyball starring Brad Pitt.

== Personal life ==
During his tenure as coach and head of talent in Lyngby Boldklub, Frederiksen received his UEFA Pro Licence in 2011, and has since functioned as a coaching instructor in the Danish Football Union.

Frederiksen has a master's degree in economics from University of Southern Denmark, and worked in Danske Bank for several years, while having a part-time job as youth coach at B.93 and Lyngby Boldklub.

His favourite club is Borussia Dortmund, who he started supporting in 2011.

== Managerial statistics ==
As of match played 22 November 2026

Managerial record by team and tenure
Team	Nat	From	To	Record								Ref
Team	Nat	From	To	G	W	D	L	GF	GA	GD	Win %	Ref
Lyngby	(Denmark)	30 March 2009	30 June 2013	154	67	27	60	241	221	+20	43.51	
Esbjerg	(Denmark)	1 July 2013	10 August 2015	92	35	25	32	139	118	+21	38.04	
Denmark U21	(Denmark)	27 August 2015	30 June 2019	41	25	5	11	84	46	+38	60.98	
Brøndby	(Denmark)	1 July 2019	14 November 2022	143	62	30	51	218	194	+24	43.36	
Lech Poznań	(Poland)	1 July 2024	Present	115	65	22	28	226	138	+88	56.52	
Career total				545	254	109	182	908	717	+191	46.61	—

== Honours ==
Brøndby

- Danish Superliga: 2020–21

Lech Poznań

- Ekstraklasa: 2024–25, 2025–26
- Polish Super Cup: 2026

Individual

- Ekstraklasa Coach of the Season: 2024–25, 2025–26
- Ekstraklasa Coach of the Month: August 2024, September 2024, May 2025, August 2026, October 2026
