= Leo Bengtsson =

Swedish footballer

Personal information
- Full name: Erik Martin Leo Bengtsson
- Date of birth: 26 May 1998 (age 28)
- Place of birth: Stockholm, Sweden
- Height: 1.80 m (5 ft 11 in)
- Position: Midfielder

Team information
- Current team: Lech Poznań
- Number: 14

Youth career
- –2009: Ingarö IF
- 2010–2016: Hammarby IF

Senior career*
Years	Team	Apps	(Gls)
2016–2019	Hammarby IF	34	(0)
2018	→ Gefle (loan)	14	(0)
2019	→ Frej (loan)	16	(3)
2020–2022	Häcken	66	(15)
2022–2025	Aris Limassol	95	(18)
2025–	Lech Poznań	42	(7)

International career
2016	Sweden U19	2	(0)
2020	Sweden U21	2	(0)
- * Club domestic league appearances and goals as of 11:08, 16 November 2026 (UTC)

Erik Martin Leo Bengtsson (born 26 May 1998) is a Swedish professional footballer who plays as a midfielder for Ekstraklasa club Lech Poznań.

== Club career ==
=== Youth years ===
Bengtsson grew up at the island Ingarö in Värmdö Municipality, just outside Stockholm. He started his football career at the local club Ingarö IF, before joining the academy at Hammarby IF in late 2010 at age 11.

At Hammarby, he would make his way up the ranks until eventually featuring regularly at the club's U21s in 2015. During the following season he was a key player as Hammarby won the Folksam U21 Allsvenskan. In the semi-final against arch rival Djurgårdens IF in October 2016, he scored two goals while settling the score to 2–1.

=== Hammarby IF ===
On 6 September 2016, Leo Bengtsson signed his first professional contract with Hammarby IF, on a three-year deal. However, the winger did not feature in any competitive game in the 2016 Allsvenskan.

At the beginning of the 2017 season, Bengtsson made his competitive debut for Hammarby in a Svenska Cupen fixture. He came on as a substitute in a group stage away game against Nyköpings BIS on 26 February. On 9 April 2017, he made his first appearance in Allsvenskan, coming on as a substitute in a 1–1 draw against Kalmar FF on home ground. Bengtsson scored his first competitive goal for the club on 16 August, in a 3–1 win against Akropolis IF in round 2 of the 2017–18 Svenska Cupen.

During the following years, Bengtsson failed to break into Hammarby's starting eleven. In 2018, he was sent on loan to Gefle IF in Superettan, Sweden's second division. On 21 January 2019, Bengtsson renewed his contract with Hammarby for another three years.

Bengtsson spent the majority of the 2019 season at Hammarby's affiliated club IK Frej. He made 34 league appearances for Hammarby in total.

=== BK Häcken ===
On 6 January 2020, Bengtsson moved to Allsvenskan club BK Häcken from Gothenburg, signing a three-year deal. The transfer fee was reportedly set at around 1 million Swedish kronor.

=== Aris Limassol ===
In 2022, Bengtsson signed with Cypriot First Division club Aris Limassol. Across three seasons, he made 115 appearances across all competitions for Aris, scoring 22 goals and providing 16 assists, and contributed to the club's maiden league title in the 2022–23 season.

=== Lech Poznań ===
On 10 July 2025, Bengtsson joined Polish Ekstraklasa club Lech Poznań on a three-year deal, with an option for a further year. Reunited with former Häcken teammate Patrik Wålemark, Bengtsson's transfer fee was reported to be approx. €800,000.

== International career ==
Bengtsson debuted for the Sweden U19 national team in a friendly against Scotland on 6 October 2016. About a month later, on 14 November 2016, he won his first competitive cap in an away qualifier against Serbia ahead of the 2017 UEFA European Under-19 Championship. Sweden won the game with a score of 3–2. Bengtsson was selected in the preliminary squad ahead of the tournament – but withdrew on request from his club, Hammarby, where he had started to play regularly.

== Career statistics ==
As of match played 8 November 2026

Appearances and goals by club, season and competition
Club	Season	League			National cup (Note: Includes Svenska Cupen, Cypriot Cup, Polish Cup)		Continental		Other		Total	
Club	Season	Division	Apps	Goals	Apps	Goals	Apps	Goals	Apps	Goals	Apps	Goals
Hammarby	2017	Allsvenskan	18	0	2	0	—		—		20	0
Hammarby	2018	Allsvenskan	10	0	3	1	—		—		13	1
Hammarby	2019	Allsvenskan	6	0	0	0	—		—		0	0
Hammarby	2020	Allsvenskan	0	0	1	0	—		—		0	0
Hammarby	Total		34	0	6	1	—		—		40	1
Gefle (loan)	2018	Superettan	14	0	0	0	—		—		14	0
Frej (loan)	2019	Superettan	16	3	0	0	—		—		16	3
Häcken	2020	Allsvenskan	25	8	3	1	—		—		28	9
Häcken	2021	Allsvenskan	28	6	6	1	2 (Note: Appearances in UEFA Europa Conference League)	1	—		34	7
Häcken	2022	Allsvenskan	13	1	2	2	—		—		17	4
Häcken	Total		66	15	11	4	2	1	—		79	20
Aris Limassol	2022–23	Cypriot First Division	33	8	1	0	2	0	—		36	8
Aris Limassol	2023–24	Cypriot First Division	30	4	4	1	12 (Note: Four appearances and two goals in UEFA Champions League, eight appearances and one goal in UEFA Europa League)	3	0	0	46	8
Aris Limassol	2024–25	Cypriot First Division	32	6	1	0	—		—		33	6
Aris Limassol	Total		95	18	6	1	14	3	0	0	115	22
Lech Poznań	2025–26	Ekstraklasa	33	6	3	0	13 (Note: Three appearances and one goal in UEFA Champions League, two appearances and one goal in UEFA Europa League, eight appearances and one goal in UEFA Conference League)	3	1 (Note: Appearance in Polish Super Cup)	0	50	9
Lech Poznań	2026–27	Ekstraklasa	9	1	1	0	5 (Note: One appearance in UEFA Champions League, four appearances and two goals in UEFA Europa League)	2	1	0	16	3
Lech Poznań	Total		42	7	4	0	18	5	2	0	66	12
Career total			267	43	27	6	34	9	2	0	330	58

== Honours ==
Aris Limassol

- Cypriot First Division: 2022–23

Lech Poznań

- Ekstraklasa: 2025–26
- Polish Super Cup: 2026
