= 2026–27 Lech Poznań season =

Lech Poznań
2026–27 season
- Co-chairmen: Karol Klimczak; Piotr Rutkowski
- Manager: Niels Frederiksen
- Stadium: Enea Stadion
- Ekstraklasa: 1st
- Polish Cup: Round of 32
- Polish Super Cup: Winners
- UEFA Champions League: Second qualifying round
- UEFA Europa League: League phase
- Top goalscorer: League: Pablo Rodríguez (6 goals); All: Patrik Wålemark (11 goals)
- Highest home attendance: UEFA Europa League: 40,116 vs. Bayer (15 October 2026)
- Lowest home attendance: UEFA Europa League: 16,541 vs. KÍ (6 August 2026)
- Average home league attendance: 29,906
- Biggest win: UEFA Europa League: Lech 7–0 Thun (20 August 2026)
- Biggest defeat: UEFA Europa League: Palace 4–0 Lech (17 September 2026); Lech 0–4 Bayer (15 October 2026)
Home colours	Away colours	Third colours
- All statistics correct as of 26 October 2026.

The 2026–27 season is Lech Poznań's 105th season in existence and the club's 25th consecutive season in the top flight of Polish football. In addition to the domestic league, Lech Poznań participates in this season's edition of the Polish Cup, the Polish Super Cup and the UEFA Champions League. The season covers the period from 1 July 2026 to 30 June 2027.

Lech enters the season as the defending champions, having won two consecutive league titles.

Lech Poznań plays their official home matches at the Stadion Miejski branded on 24 July 2023 as Enea Stadion for sponsorship reasons for four next seasons.

== Club ==
=== Coaching staff ===
Position	Staff
Manager	(Denmark) Niels Frederiksen
Assistant coaches	(Norway) Andreas Hagen (Poland) Hubert Wędzonka (England) Andy Parslow
Goalkeeping coach	(Poland) Dominik Kubiak
Match analyst	(Poland) Hubert Barański
Head of Physical Performance	(Poland) Łukasz Bortnik
Fitness coaches	(Poland) Karol Kikut (Poland) Michał Włodarczyk (Poland) Józef Napierała (Czech Republic) Antonin Čepek (until 21 September 2026)
Head of medical department	(Poland) Rafał Hejna
Lead Consultant in Orthopaedics	(Poland) Tomasz Piontek
Team doctors	(Poland) Tomasz Jaśkowiak (Poland) Patrick Buliński (Poland) Filip Jakubowski
Physiotherapists	(Poland) Maciej Łopatka (Poland) Marcin Lis (Poland) Maciej Smuniewski (Poland) Bartosz Górecki
Dietician	(Poland) Patryk Wiśniewski
Team manager	(Poland) Mariusz Skrzypczak
Kit manager	(Poland) Sławomir Mizgalski
Cook	(Poland) Artur Dzierzbicki

Source: Lech Poznań

=== Management ===
Position	Staff
Chairman	(Poland) Karol Klimczak (Poland) Piotr Rutkowski
Sporting director	(Poland) Tomasz Rząsa

Source: Lech Poznań

== Current squad ==
As of 22 August 2026.

Note: Flags indicate national team as defined under FIFA eligibility rules; some limited exceptions apply. Players may hold more than one non-FIFA nationality.

No.	Pos.	Nation	Player
1	GK	POL	Mateusz Lis
2	DF	POR	Joel Pereira
3	DF	SWE	Alex Douglas
4	DF	POR	João Moutinho
5	MF	SWE	Gustav Berggren
7	FW	CIV	Yannick Agnero
8	MF	IRI	Ali Gholizadeh
9	FW	SWE	Mikael Ishak (captain)
10	MF	SWE	Patrik Wålemark
11	MF	FIN	Daniel Håkans
14	MF	SWE	Leo Bengtsson
15	DF	POL	Michał Gurgul
17	MF	IRI	Allahyar Sayyadmanesh
20	DF	POL	Robert Gumny

No.	Pos.	Nation	Player
21	MF	ESP	Pablo Rodríguez
22	MF	POL	Radosław Murawski (Vice-captain)
24	MF	POL	Filip Jagiełło
27	DF	POL	Wojciech Mońka
31	GK	POL	Wiktor Obremski
33	GK	POL	Mateusz Pruchniewski
43	MF	POL	Antoni Kozubal
53	MF	POL	Karol Delikat
54	FW	POL	Kamil Jakóbczyk
56	FW	POL	Wojciech Szymczak
59	DF	GHA	Terry Yegbe
72	DF	POL	Mateusz Skrzypczak
77	MF	HON	Luis Palma
90	DF	POL	Hubert Janyszka

=== Out on loan ===
Note: Flags indicate national team as defined under FIFA eligibility rules; some limited exceptions apply. Players may hold more than one non-FIFA nationality.

No.	Pos.	Nation	Player
23	MF	ISL	Gísli Þórðarson (at (Germany) St. Pauli until 30 June 2027)
44	MF	POL	Tymoteusz Gmur (at Stal Mielec until 30 June 2027)
—	MF	POL	Sammy Dudek (at Unia Skierniewice until 30 June 2027)

No.	Pos.	Nation	Player
—	DF	USA	Ian Hoffmann (at (Sweden) Mjällby until 31 December 2026)
—	MF	POL	Bartłomiej Barański (at Odra Opole until 30 June 2027)

== Transfer ==
=== Summer transfer window ===
==== In ====
No.	Pos.	Nat.	Name	Age	EU	Moving from	Type	Transfer window	Ends	Transfer fee	Source
	MF	(Poland)	Bartłomiej Barański	19	EU	GKS Tychy	Loan return	Summer	2029	Free	
	GK	(Poland)	Krzysztof Bąkowski	23	EU	(Norway) KFUM Oslo	Loan return	Summer	2026	Free	
5	MF	(Sweden)	Gustav Berggren	28	EU	(United States) New York Red Bulls	Transfer	Summer	2029	€500,000	
53	MF	(Poland)	Karol Delikat	18	EU		Transfer	Summer	2028	Youth system	
	FW	(Norway)	Bryan Fiabema	23	EU	(Netherlands) ADO Den Haag	Loan return	Summer	2027	Free	
	DF	(United States)	Ian Hoffmann	24	EU	(Norway) HamKam	Loan return	Summer	2027	Free	
1	GK	(Poland)	Mateusz Lis	29	EU	(Turkey) Göztepe	Transfer	Summer	2029	€900,000	
31	GK	(Poland)	Wiktor Obremski	18	EU		Transfer	Summer	2029	Youth system	
77	MF	(Honduras)	Luis Palma	26	Non-EU	(Scotland) Celtic	Transfer	Summer	2029	€4,050,000	
17	MF	(Iran)	Allahyar Sayyadmanesh	24	Non-EU	(Belgium) Westerlo	Transfer	Summer	2029	Free	
	FW	(Poland)	Filip Szymczak	24	EU	(Belgium) Charleroi	Loan return	Summer	2027	Free	
56	FW	(Poland)	Wojciech Szymczak	18	EU		Transfer	Summer	2028	Youth system	
59	DF	(Ghana)	Terry Yegbe	25	Non-EU	(France) Metz	Transfer	Summer	2030	€3,000,000	

Total spending: ▼€8,450,000

==== Out ====
No.	Pos.	Nat.	Name	Age	EU	Moving to	Type	Transfer window	Transfer fee	Source
1	GK	(Bulgaria)	Plamen Andreev	21	EU	(Netherlands) Feyenoord	Loan return	Summer	Free	
	MF	(Poland)	Bartłomiej Barański	19	EU	Odra Opole	Loan	Summer	Free	
	GK	(Poland)	Krzysztof Bąkowski	23	EU	Chrobry Głogów	Transfer	Summer	Undisclosed	
53	MF	(Poland) (Germany)	Sammy Dudek	18	EU	Unia Skierniewice	Loan	Summer	Free	
	FW	(Norway)	Bryan Fiabema	23	EU	(Norway) Fredrikstad	Transfer	Summer	€100,000	
44	MF	(Poland)	Tymoteusz Gmur	18	EU	Stal Mielec	Loan	Summer	Free	
	DF	(United States)	Ian Hoffmann	24	EU	(Sweden) Mjällby	Loan	Summer	Free	
88	MF	(Nigeria)	Taofeek Ismaheel	25	Non-EU	Górnik Zabrze	Loan return	Summer	Free	
56	MF	(Poland)	Kornel Lisman	20	EU	(Italy) Venezia	Transfer	Summer	€2,500,000	
16	DF	(Croatia)	Antonio Milić	32	EU	Wieczysta Kraków	End of contract	Summer	Free	
41	GK	(Poland)	Bartosz Mrozek	26	EU	(Italy) Udinese	Transfer	Summer	€1,400,000	
6	MF	(Kenya)	Timothy Ouma	22	Non-EU	(Czech Republic) Slavia Prague	Loan return	Summer	Free	
77	MF	(Honduras)	Luis Palma	26	Non-EU	(Scotland) Celtic	Loan return	Summer	Free	
	FW	(Poland)	Filip Szymczak	24	EU	Zagłębie Lubin	Transfer	Summer	€250,000	
23	MF	(Iceland)	Gísli Þórðarson	21	Non-EU	(Germany) St. Pauli	Loan	Summer	Free	

Total income: ▲€4,250,000

Total expenditure: ▼€4,200,000

== Friendlies ==
Win Draw Loss

4 July 2026 Club friendly	Lech Poznań	3–1	(Slovakia) Železiarne Podbrezová	Wronki
11:00 CEST (UTC+02:00)	Lampreht 23' (o.g.); Dudek 58'; Rodríguez 83'	90minut Official website KKSLECH.com	Silagadze 60'	Stadium: Lech Poznań Academy Stadium; Attendance: 999

11 July 2026 Club friendly	Lech Poznań	4–0	(Czech Republic) Bohemians 1905	Wronki
11:00 CEST (UTC+02:00)	Kozubal 11'; Ishak 35'; Szymczak 83', 90'	90minut Official website Opponent official website KKSLECH.com		Stadium: Lech Poznań Academy Stadium; Attendance: 0

11 July 2026 Club friendly	Lech Poznań	0–0	Polonia Środa Wielkopolska	Wronki
12:55 CEST (UTC+02:00)		90minut Official website Opponent official website		Stadium: Lech Poznań Academy Stadium; Attendance: 0
Note: The match featured a 1x45 minute format.

3 October 2026 Club friendly	Lech Poznań	2–2	(Germany) Energie Cottbus	Poznań
13:30 CEST (UTC+02:00)	Agnero 9'; Bengtsson 65'	90minut Official website Opponent official website	Butler 1'; Kinsombi 49'	Stadium: Lech Poznań training ground Attendance: 0

== Competitions ==
Win Draw Loss

=== Overview ===
Competition	First match	Last match	Starting round	Final position	Record							
Competition	First match	Last match	Starting round	Final position	Pld	W	D	L	GF	GA	GD	Win %
Ekstraklasa	25 July 2026	22 May 2027	Matchday 1	1st	11	9	1	1	29	10	+19	81.82
Polish Cup	28 October 2026		Round of 32	Round of 32	0	0	0	0	0	0	+0	—
Polish Super Cup	16 July 2026		Final	Winners	1	1	0	0	3	1	+2	100.00
UEFA Champions League	21 July 2026	29 July 2026	Second qualifying round	Second qualifying round	2	1	0	1	5	5	+0	50.00
UEFA Europa League	6 August 2026		Third qualifying round	League phase	7	3	2	2	16	11	+5	42.86
Total					21	14	3	4	53	27	+26	66.67

Last updated: 25 October 2026
Source: Competitions

=== Ekstraklasa ===
==== League table ====
Pos	Team	Pld	W	D	L	GF	GA	GD	Pts	Qualification or relegation
1	Lech Poznań	11	9	1	1	29	10	+19	28	Qualification for the Champions League play-off round
2	Górnik Zabrze	12	8	3	1	21	11	+10	27	Qualification for the Champions League second qualifying round
3	Pogoń Szczecin	11	7	3	1	19	9	+10	24	Qualification for the Europa League second qualifying round
4	Legia Warsaw	12	6	5	1	23	11	+12	23	Qualification for the Conference League second qualifying round
5	Wisła Kraków	12	6	3	3	19	15	+4	21	

Updated to match(es) played on 25 October 2026. Source: ekstraklasa.org 90minut.pl
Rules for classification: 1) Points; 2) Head-to-head points; 3) Head-to-head goal difference; 4) Goal difference; 5) Goals scored; 6) Number of wins; 7) Number of away wins; 8) Lower number of points based on yellow and red cards (red card = 3 points, yellow card = 1 point, sending-off = 3 points - including 1 point for first yellow card); 9) Fairplay ranking; 10) Draw.
(Note: Head-to-head record is used only after all the matches between the teams in question have been played)

==== Results summary ====
Overall								Home						Away					
Pld	W	D	L	GF	GA	GD	Pts	W	D	L	GF	GA	GD	W	D	L	GF	GA	GD
11	9	1	1	29	10	+19	28	5	1	0	17	3	+14	4	0	1	12	7	+5

Last updated: 25 October 2026.
Source: Ekstraklasa 90minut.pl

==== Results by round ====
Round	1	2	3	4	5	6	7	8	9	10	11	12	13	14	15	16	17	18	19	20	21	22	23	24	25	26	27	28	29	30	31	32	33	34
Ground	H	A	H	A	H	A	H	A	H	A	H	A	H	H	A	H	A	A	H	A	H	A	H	A	H	A	H	A	H	A	A	H	A	H
Result	D	W	W		W	W	W	L	W	W	W	W																						
Position	10	3	1	3	4	2	1	3	3	2	2	1																						

Updated to match(es) played on 25 October 2026. Source: Ekstraklasa 90minut.pl
A = Away; H = Home; W = Win; D = Draw; L = Loss; P = Postponed

==== Matches ====
Win Draw Loss Postponed

25 July 2026 Match 1	Lech Poznań	0–0	Cracovia	Poznań
20:15 CEST (UTC+02:00)		Ekstraklasa; 90minut		Stadium: Enea Stadion; Attendance: 31,310; Referee: Damian Sylwestrzak (Wrocław)

1 August 2026 Match 2	Wieczysta Kraków	1–2	Lech Poznań	Kraków
17:30 CEST (UTC+02:00)	Piazon 66'	Ekstraklasa; 90minut	Agnero 35'; Sayyadmanesh 43'	Stadium: Synerise Arena Kraków; Attendance: 6,792; Referee: Wojciech Myć (Lublin)

9 August 2026 Match 3	Lech Poznań	3–0	Piast Gliwice	Poznań
17:30 CEST (UTC+02:00)	Ishak 63'; Delikat 79'; Sayyadmanesh 90'	Ekstraklasa; 90minut		Stadium: Enea Stadion; Attendance: 25,329; Referee: Patryk Gryckiewicz (Toruń)

30 August 2026 Match 6	Widzew Łódź	2–3	Lech Poznań	Łódź
20:15 CEST (UTC+02:00)	Świderski 27'; Fornalczyk 53'	Ekstraklasa; 90minut	Kozubal 6'; Sayyadmanesh 22'; Palma 90+6'	Stadium: Stadion Miejski Widzewa; Attendance: 17,555; Referee: Łukasz Kuźma (Białystok)

3 September 2026 Match 5	Lech Poznań	2–1	Jagiellonia Białystok	Poznań
20:30 CEST (UTC+02:00)	Rodríguez 43'; Gumny 87'	Ekstraklasa; 90minut	Kobayashi 45+4'	Stadium: Enea Stadion; Attendance: 24,201; Referee: Szymon Marciniak (Płock)
Note: The match originally scheduled for 22–23 August 2026 has been postponed.

6 September 2026 Match 7	Lech Poznań	1–0	Raków Częstochowa	Poznań
17:30 CEST (UTC+02:00)	Bengtsson 71'	Ekstraklasa; 90minut		Stadium: Enea Stadion; Attendance: 33,615; Referee: Damian Kos (Gdańsk)

12 September 2026 Match 8	Górnik Zabrze	2–1	Lech Poznań	Zabrze
17:30 CEST (UTC+02:00)	Prekop 76', 80'	Ekstraklasa; 90minut	Sayyadmanesh 36'	Stadium: Stadion im. Ernesta Pohla; Attendance: 28,007; Referee: Wojciech Myć (Lublin)

20 September 2026 Match 9	Lech Poznań	5–1	Radomiak Radom	Poznań
20:15 CEST (UTC+02:00)	Rodríguez 3', 67'; Wålemark 9', 51'; Sayyadmanesh 41'	Ekstraklasa; 90minut	Guilherme 1'	Stadium: Enea Stadion; Attendance: 19,478; Referee: Jarosław Przybył (Kluczbork)

10 October 2026 Match 10	Śląsk Wrocław	1–4	Lech Poznań	Wrocław
17:30 CEST (UTC+02:00)	Tomasiewicz 90+3'	Ekstraklasa; 90minut	Jagiełło 31'; Rodríguez 50'; Wålemark 70', 73'	Stadium: Tarczyński Arena; Attendance: 33,863; Referee: Patryk Gryckiewicz (Toruń)

18 October 2026 Match 11	Lech Poznań	6–1	Korona Kielce	Poznań
17:30 CEST (UTC+02:00)	Wålemark 4'; Rodríguez 6', 45+4'; Ishak 23', 55'; Agnero 90+1'	Ekstraklasa; 90minut	Mena 57'	Stadium: Enea Stadion; Attendance: 37,407; Referee: Łukasz Kuźma (Białystok)

25 October 2026 Match 12	Legia Warsaw	1–2	Lech Poznań	Warsaw
17:30 CET (UTC+01:00)	Vyunnyk 74'	Ekstraklasa; 90minut	Agnero 56'; Palma 87'	Stadium: Stadion Wojska Polskiego; Attendance: 27,410; Referee: Szymon Marciniak (Płock)

31 October 2026 Match 13	Lech Poznań	v	Wisła Kraków	Poznań
17:30 CET (UTC+01:00)		[ Ekstraklasa] [ 90minut]		Stadium: Enea Stadion

8 November 2026 Match 14	Lech Poznań	v	Zagłębie Lubin	Poznań
20:15 CET (UTC+01:00)		[ Ekstraklasa] [ 90minut]		Stadium: Enea Stadion

22 November 2026 Match 15	GKS Katowice	v	Lech Poznań	Katowice
14:45 CET (UTC+01:00)		[ Ekstraklasa] [ 90minut]		Stadium: Arena Katowice

28-29 November 2026 Match 16	Lech Poznań	v	Pogoń Szczecin	Poznań
CET (UTC+01:00)		[ Ekstraklasa] [ 90minut]		Stadium: Enea Stadion

5-6 December 2026 Match 17	Motor Lublin	v	Lech Poznań	Lublin
CET (UTC+01:00)		[ Ekstraklasa] [ 90minut]		Stadium: Arena Lublin

12-13 December 2026 Match 18	Cracovia	v	Lech Poznań	Kraków
CET (UTC+01:00)		[ Ekstraklasa] [ 90minut]		Stadium: Stadion Cracovii im. Józefa Piłsudskiego

17 December 2026 Match 4	Wisła Płock	v	Lech Poznań	Płock
CET (UTC+01:00)		[ Ekstraklasa] [ 90minut]		Stadium: Stadion im. Kazimierza Górskiego
Note: The match originally scheduled for 16 August 2026 has been postponed at the request of the visiting team.

30-31 January 2027 Match 19	Lech Poznań	v	Wieczysta Kraków	Poznań
CET (UTC+01:00)		[ Ekstraklasa] [ 90minut]		Stadium: Enea Stadion

6-7 February 2027 Match 20	Piast Gliwice	v	Lech Poznań	Gliwice
CET (UTC+01:00)		[ Ekstraklasa] [ 90minut]		Stadium: Stadion Miejski

13-14 February 2027 Match 21	Lech Poznań	v	Wisła Płock	Poznań
CET (UTC+01:00)		[ Ekstraklasa] [ 90minut]		Stadium: Enea Stadion

20-21 February 2027 Match 22	Jagiellonia Białystok	v	Lech Poznań	Białystok
CET (UTC+01:00)		[ Ekstraklasa] [ 90minut]		Stadium: Stadion Miejski

27-28 February 2027 Match 23	Lech Poznań	v	Widzew Łódź	Poznań
CET (UTC+01:00)		[ Ekstraklasa] [ 90minut]		Stadium: Enea Stadion

6-7 March 2027 Match 24	Raków Częstochowa	v	Lech Poznań	Częstochowa
CET (UTC+01:00)		[ Ekstraklasa] [ 90minut]		Stadium: zondacrypto Arena

13-14 March 2027 Match 25	Lech Poznań	v	Górnik Zabrze	Poznań
CET (UTC+01:00)		[ Ekstraklasa] [ 90minut]		Stadium: Enea Stadion

20-21 March 2027 Match 26	Radomiak Radom	v	Lech Poznań	Radom
CET (UTC+01:00)		[ Ekstraklasa] [ 90minut]		Stadium: Stadion im. Braci Czachorów

3-4 April 2027 Match 27	Lech Poznań	v	Śląsk Wrocław	Poznań
CEST (UTC+02:00)		[ Ekstraklasa] [ 90minut]		Stadium: Enea Stadion

10-11 April 2027 Match 28	Korona Kielce	v	Lech Poznań	Kielce
CEST (UTC+02:00)		[ Ekstraklasa] [ 90minut]		Stadium: Stadion Miejski

17-18 April 2027 Match 29	Lech Poznań	v	Legia Warsaw	Poznań
CEST (UTC+02:00)		[ Ekstraklasa] [ 90minut]		Stadium: Enea Stadion

24-25 April 2027 Match 30	Wisła Kraków	v	Lech Poznań	Kraków
CEST (UTC+02:00)		[ Ekstraklasa] [ 90minut]		Stadium: Synerise Arena Kraków

1-2 May 2027 Match 31	Zagłębie Lubin	v	Lech Poznań	Lubin
CEST (UTC+02:00)		[ Ekstraklasa] [ 90minut]		Stadium: KGHM Zagłębie Arena

8-9 May 2027 Match 32	Lech Poznań	v	GKS Katowice	Poznań
CEST (UTC+02:00)		[ Ekstraklasa] [ 90minut]		Stadium: Enea Stadion

15-16 May 2027 Match 33	Pogoń Szczecin	v	Lech Poznań	Szczecin
CEST (UTC+02:00)		[ Ekstraklasa] [ 90minut]		Stadium: Stadion Miejski im. Floriana Krygiera

22-23 May 2027 Match 34	Lech Poznań	v	Motor Lublin	Poznań
CEST (UTC+02:00)		[ Ekstraklasa] [ 90minut]		Stadium: Enea Stadion

=== Polish Cup ===
28 October 2026 Round of 32	Siarka Tarnobrzeg	1–0	Lech Poznań	Tarnobrzeg
12:30 CET (UTC+01:00)		[ Łączy nas piłka] [ 90minut]		Stadium: Stadion Miejski

=== Polish Super Cup ===
16 July 2026 Final	Lech Poznań	3–1	Górnik Zabrze	Poznań
19:00 CEST (UTC+2)	Kozubal 27'; Ishak 47'; Rodríguez 69'	PZPN; 90minut.pl	Khlan 14'	Stadium: Enea Stadion; Attendance: 37,843; Referee: Damian Kos (Gdańsk)

=== UEFA Champions League ===
==== Second qualifying round ====
21 July 2026 First leg	AGF (Denmark)	1–4	(Poland) Lech Poznań	Randers, Denmark
19:00 CEST (UTC+02:00)	Arnstad 55'	Report	Ishak 29'; Wålemark 42', 65'; Yegbe 61'	Stadium: Cepheus Park; Attendance: 8,943; Referee: Oliver Reitala (Finland)

29 July 2026 Second leg	Lech Poznań (Poland)	1–4 (a.e.t.) (5–5 agg.) (3–4 p)	(Denmark) AGF	Poznań
19:00 CEST (UTC+02:00)	Jagiełło 95'	Report	Bech 32'; Arnstad 55' (pen.); Tingager 75'; Kristjánsson 100'	Stadium: Enea Stadion; Attendance: 36,215; Referee: Juxhin Xhaja (Albania)
	Penalties
	Jagiełło (penalty scored); Sayyadmanesh (penalty missed); Kozubal (penalty missed); Agnero (penalty scored); Pereira (penalty scored)		(penalty missed) Arnstad; (penalty scored) Tingager; (penalty scored) Kristjánsson; (penalty scored) Serra; (penalty scored) Bech

=== UEFA Europa League ===
==== Third qualifying round ====
6 August 2026 First leg	Lech Poznań (Poland)	1–0	(Faroe Islands) KÍ	Poznań
19:00 CEST (UTC+02:00)	Agnero 81'	Report		Stadium: Enea Stadion; Attendance: 16,541; Referee: Orel Grinfeld (Israel)

14 August 2026 Second leg	KÍ (Faroe Islands)	0–5 (0–6 agg.)	(Poland) Lech Poznań	Tórshavn, Faroe Islands
20:00 CEST (UTC+02:00)		Report	Sayyadmanesh 20'; Rodríguez 49'; Kozubal 75'; Håkans 88'; Wålemark 90+2'	Stadium: Tórsvøllur; Attendance: 1,465; Referee: Igor Pajač (Croatia)
Note: The match originally scheduled for 13 August 2026 at 19:30 CEST has been postponed to the following day due to heavy fog that disrupted the travel of Lech Poznań from landing in the Faroe Islands.

==== Play-off round ====
20 August 2026 First leg	Lech Poznań (Poland)	7–0	(Switzerland) Thun	Poznań
19:00 CEST (UTC+02:00)	Wålemark 10', 25'; Sayyadmanesh 20'; Skrzypczak 31'; Murawski 45'; Håkans 48'; Gumny 79'	Report		Stadium: Enea Stadion; Attendance: 22,241; Referee: Sebastian Gishamer (Austria)

27 August 2026 Second leg	Thun (Switzerland)	2–2 (9–2 agg.)	(Poland) Lech Poznań	Thun, Switzerland
20:00 CEST (UTC+02:00)	Lengen 22'; Dursun 43'	Report	Gumny 17'; Wålemark 68'	Stadium: Stockhorn Arena; Attendance: 5,523; Referee: Halil Umut Meler (Turkey)

==== League phase ====
Pos	Team	Pld	W	D	L	GF	GA	GD	Pts
30	(Israel) Hapoel Be'er Sheva	3	0	1	2	1	6	−5	1
31	(Norway) Lillestrøm	3	0	1	2	2	9	−7	1
32	(Poland) Lech Poznań	3	0	1	2	1	9	−8	1
33	(Czech Republic) Viktoria Plzeň	3	0	0	3	2	7	−5	0
34	(France) Marseille	3	0	0	3	1	6	−5	0

Updated to match(es) played on 22 October 2026. Source: UEFA
Rules for classification: League phase tiebreakers

17 September 2026 Match 1	Crystal Palace (England)	4–0	(Poland) Lech Poznań	London, England
21:00 CEST (UTC+02:00)	Pino 10'; Richards 27'; Larsen 34' (pen.); Nketiah 89'	Report		Stadium: Selhurst Park; Attendance: 18,117; Referee: Michal Očenáš (Slovakia)

15 October 2026 Match 2	Lech Poznań (Poland)	0–4	(Germany) Bayer Leverkusen	Poznań
18:45 CEST (UTC+02:00)		Report	Schick 29' (pen.), 41' (pen.); Tillman 32'; Maza 89'	Stadium: Enea Stadion; Attendance: 40,116; Referee: Miloš Milanović (Serbia)

22 October 2026 Match 3	Lech Poznań (Poland)	1–1	(England) Sunderland	Poznań
18:45 CEST (UTC+02:00)	Bengtsson 70'	Report	Tutyerov 2'	Stadium: Enea Stadion; Attendance: 34,606; Referee: Balázs Berke (Hungary)

5 November 2026 Match 4	Benfica (Portugal)	v	(Poland) Lech Poznań	Lisbon, Portugal
21:00 CET (UTC+01:00)		Report		Stadium: Estádio da Luz

26 November 2026 Match 5	Union Saint-Gilloise (Belgium)	v	(Poland) Lech Poznań	Leuven, Belgium
18:45 CET (UTC+01:00)		Report		Stadium: Den Dreef

10 December 2026 Match 6	Lech Poznań (Poland)	v	(Hungary) Ferencváros	Poznań
21:00 CET (UTC+01:00)		Report		Stadium: Enea Stadion

21 January 2027 Match 7	Lech Poznań (Poland)	v	(Portugal) Torreense	Poznań
21:00 CET (UTC+01:00)		Report		Stadium: Enea Stadion

28 January 2027 Match 8	OFI (Greece)	v	(Poland) Lech Poznań	Heraklion, Greece
21:00 CET (UTC+01:00)		Report		Stadium: Pankritio Stadium

== Statistics ==
=== Appearances and goals ===
As of 25 October 2026.

No.	Pos	Player	Ekstraklasa		Polish Cup		Polish Super Cup		UEFA		Total	
No.	Pos	Player	Apps	Goals	Apps	Goals	Apps	Goals	Apps	Goals	Apps	Goals
Goalkeepers
1	GK	(Poland) Mateusz Lis	11	0	0	0	1	0	9	0	21	0
31	GK	(Poland) Wiktor Obremski	0	0	0	0	0	0	0	0	0	0
33	GK	(Poland) Mateusz Pruchniewski	0	0	0	0	0	0	0	0	0	0
Defenders
2	DF	(Portugal) Joel Pereira	10+1	0	0	0	1	0	7+1	0	20	0
3	DF	(Sweden) Alex Douglas	0	0	0	0	0	0	0	0	0	0
4	DF	(Portugal) João Moutinho	1	0	0	0	0	0	0	0	1	0
15	DF	(Poland) Michał Gurgul	10+1	0	0	0	1	0	9	0	21	0
20	DF	(Poland) Robert Gumny	2+4	1	0	0	0	0	2+4	2	12	3
27	DF	(Poland) Wojciech Mońka	9	0	0	0	1	0	8	0	18	0
59	DF	(Ghana) Terry Yegbe	4+1	0	0	0	1	0	5+2	1	13	1
72	DF	(Poland) Mateusz Skrzypczak	9	0	0	0	0	0	5	1	14	1
90	DF	(Poland) Hubert Janyszka	0+1	0	0	0	0	0	0	0	1	0
Midfielders
5	MF	(Sweden) Gustav Berggren	2+5	0	0	0	0	0	2+2	0	11	0
8	MF	(Iran) Ali Gholizadeh	0	0	0	0	0	0	0	0	0	0
10	MF	(Sweden) Patrik Wålemark	9+2	5	0	0	1	0	8+1	6	21	11
11	MF	(Finland) Daniel Håkans	1+5	0	0	0	0	0	2+6	2	14	2
14	MF	(Sweden) Leo Bengtsson	3+4	1	0	0	0+1	0	1+3	1	12	2
17	MF	(Iran) Allahyar Sayyadmanesh	6+2	5	0	0	0+1	0	5+1	2	15	7
21	MF	(Spain) Pablo Rodríguez	9+2	6	0	0	1	1	7+2	1	21	8
22	MF	(Poland) Radosław Murawski	9+2	0	0	0	1	0	6+2	1	20	1
24	MF	(Poland) Filip Jagiełło	5+5	1	0	0	0+1	0	0+6	1	17	2
43	MF	(Poland) Antoni Kozubal	6+1	1	0	0	1	1	8	1	16	3
53	MF	(Poland) Karol Delikat	0+1	1	0	0	0	0	0+2	0	3	1
77	MF	(Honduras) Luis Palma	5+5	2	0	0	1	0	7+2	0	20	2
Forwards
7	FW	(Ivory Coast) Yannick Agnero	4+7	3	0	0	0+1	0	1+6	1	19	4
9	FW	(Sweden) Mikael Ishak	6+3	3	0	0	1	1	7	1	17	5
54	FW	(Poland) Kamil Jakóbczyk	0	0	0	0	0	0	0	0	0	0
56	FW	(Poland) Wojciech Szymczak	0+1	0	0	0	0	0	0+1	0	2	0
Players who appeared for Lech and left the club during the season:
23	MF	(Iceland) Gísli Þórðarson	0	0	0	0	0+1	0	0+1	0	2	0

=== Goalscorers ===
As of 25 October 2026.

Place	Number	Position	Nation	Name	Ekstraklasa	Polish Cup	Polish Super Cup	UEFA	Total
1	10	MF	(Sweden)	Patrik Wålemark	5	0	0	6	11
2	21	MF	(Spain)	Pablo Rodríguez	6	0	1	1	8
3	17	MF	(Iran)	Allahyar Sayyadmanesh	5	0	0	2	7
4	9	FW	(Sweden)	Mikael Ishak	3	0	1	1	5
5	7	FW	(Ivory Coast)	Yannick Agnero	3	0	0	1	4
6	20	DF	(Poland)	Robert Gumny	1	0	0	2	3
6	43	MF	(Poland)	Antoni Kozubal	1	0	1	1	3
8	11	MF	(Finland)	Daniel Håkans	0	0	0	2	2
8	14	MF	(Sweden)	Leo Bengtsson	1	0	0	1	2
8	24	MF	(Poland)	Filip Jagiełło	1	0	0	1	2
8	77	MF	(Honduras)	Luis Palma	2	0	0	0	2
12	22	MF	(Poland)	Radosław Murawski	0	0	0	1	1
12	53	MF	(Poland)	Karol Delikat	1	0	0	0	1
12	59	DF	(Ghana)	Terry Yegbe	0	0	0	1	1
12	72	DF	(Poland)	Mateusz Skrzypczak	0	0	0	1	1
TOTALS					29	0	3	21	53

=== Assists ===
As of 25 October 2026.

Place	Number	Position	Nation	Name	Ekstraklasa	Polish Cup	Polish Super Cup	UEFA	Total
1	21	MF	(Spain)	Pablo Rodríguez	6	0	0	2	8
2	2	DF	(Portugal)	Joel Pereira	4	0	0	1	5
2	10	MF	(Sweden)	Patrik Wålemark	3	0	1	1	5
4	9	FW	(Sweden)	Mikael Ishak	3	0	0	1	4
4	15	DF	(Poland)	Michał Gurgul	2	0	0	2	4
4	43	MF	(Poland)	Antoni Kozubal	0	0	1	3	4
4	77	MF	(Honduras)	Luis Palma	2	0	0	2	4
8	11	MF	(Finland)	Daniel Håkans	3	0	0	0	3
9	17	MF	(Iran)	Allahyar Sayyadmanesh	0	0	0	2	2
10	1	GK	(Poland)	Mateusz Lis	0	0	0	1	1
10	14	MF	(Sweden)	Leo Bengtsson	1	0	0	0	1
10	27	DF	(Poland)	Wojciech Mońka	0	0	0	1	1
10	72	DF	(Poland)	Mateusz Skrzypczak	1	0	0	0	1
TOTALS					25	0	2	16	43

=== Clean sheets ===
As of 25 October 2026.

Place	Number	Nation	Name	Ekstraklasa	Polish Cup	Polish Super Cup	UEFA	Total
1	1	(Poland)	Mateusz Lis	3	0	0	3	6
TOTALS				3	0	0	3	6

=== Disciplinary record ===
As of 25 October 2026.

Number	Position	Nation	Name	Ekstraklasa			Polish Cup			Polish Super Cup			UEFA			Total		
Number	Position	Nation	Name	Yellow card	(yellow card) (yellow-red card)	Red card	Yellow card	(yellow card) (yellow-red card)	Red card	Yellow card	(yellow card) (yellow-red card)	Red card	Yellow card	(yellow card) (yellow-red card)	Red card	Yellow card	(yellow card) (yellow-red card)	Red card
1	GK	(Poland)	Mateusz Lis	0	0	0	–			0	0	0	0	0	0	0	0	0
2	DF	(Portugal)	Joel Pereira	2	0	0	–			0	0	0	0	0	0	2	0	0
3	DF	(Sweden)	Alex Douglas	–												0	0	0
4	DF	(Portugal)	João Moutinho	0	0	0	–									0	0	0
5	MF	(Sweden)	Gustav Berggren	0	0	0	–						1	0	0	1	0	0
7	FW	(Ivory Coast)	Yannick Agnero	0	0	0	–			0	0	0	2	0	0	2	0	0
8	MF	(Iran)	Ali Gholizadeh	–												0	0	0
9	FW	(Sweden)	Mikael Ishak	1	0	0	–			0	0	0	0	0	0	1	0	0
10	MF	(Sweden)	Patrik Wålemark	3	0	0	–			0	0	0	1	0	0	4	0	0
11	MF	(Finland)	Daniel Håkans	0	0	0	–						0	0	0	0	0	0
14	MF	(Sweden)	Leo Bengtsson	1	0	0	–			0	0	0	0	0	0	1	0	0
15	DF	(Poland)	Michał Gurgul	2	0	0	–			0	0	0	1	0	0	3	0	0
17	MF	(Iran)	Allahyar Sayyadmanesh	1	0	0	–			0	0	0	1	0	0	2	0	0
20	DF	(Poland)	Robert Gumny	0	0	0	–						0	0	0	0	0	0
21	MF	(Spain)	Pablo Rodríguez	1	0	0	–			0	0	0	0	0	0	1	0	0
22	MF	(Poland)	Radosław Murawski	2	0	0	–			0	0	0	3	1	0	5	1	0
24	MF	(Poland)	Filip Jagiełło	1	0	0	–			0	0	0	0	0	0	1	0	0
27	DF	(Poland)	Wojciech Mońka	1	0	0	–			0	0	0	0	0	0	1	0	0
31	GK	(Poland)	Wiktor Obremski	–												0	0	0
33	GK	(Poland)	Mateusz Pruchniewski	–												0	0	0
43	MF	(Poland)	Antoni Kozubal	0	0	0	–			1	0	0	1	0	0	2	0	0
53	MF	(Poland)	Karol Delikat	0	0	0	–						0	0	0	0	0	0
54	FW	(Poland)	Kamil Jakóbczyk	–												0	0	0
56	FW	(Poland)	Wojciech Szymczak	0	0	0	–						0	0	0	0	0	0
59	DF	(Ghana)	Terry Yegbe	1	0	0	–			0	0	0	0	0	0	1	0	0
72	DF	(Poland)	Mateusz Skrzypczak	1	0	0	–						2	0	0	3	0	0
77	MF	(Honduras)	Luis Palma	1	0	0	–			0	0	0	0	0	0	1	0	0
90	DF	(Poland)	Hubert Janyszka	0	0	0	–									0	0	0
Players who appeared for Lech and left the club during the season:
23	MF	(Iceland)	Gísli Þórðarson	–						1	0	0	0	0	0	1	0	0
TOTALS				18	0	0	0	0	0	2	0	0	12	1	0	32	1	0

=== Home attendances ===
As of 22 October 2026.

	Matches	Total attendances	Average attendance	Highest attendance	Lowest attendance
Ekstraklasa	6	171,340	28,557	37,407	19,478
Polish Cup	0	0	0	0	0
Polish Super Cup	1	37,843	37,843	37,843	37,843
UEFA	5	149,719	29,944	40,116	16,541
Total	12	358,902	29,906	40,116	16,541
