= Antoni Kozubal =

Polish footballer (born 2004)

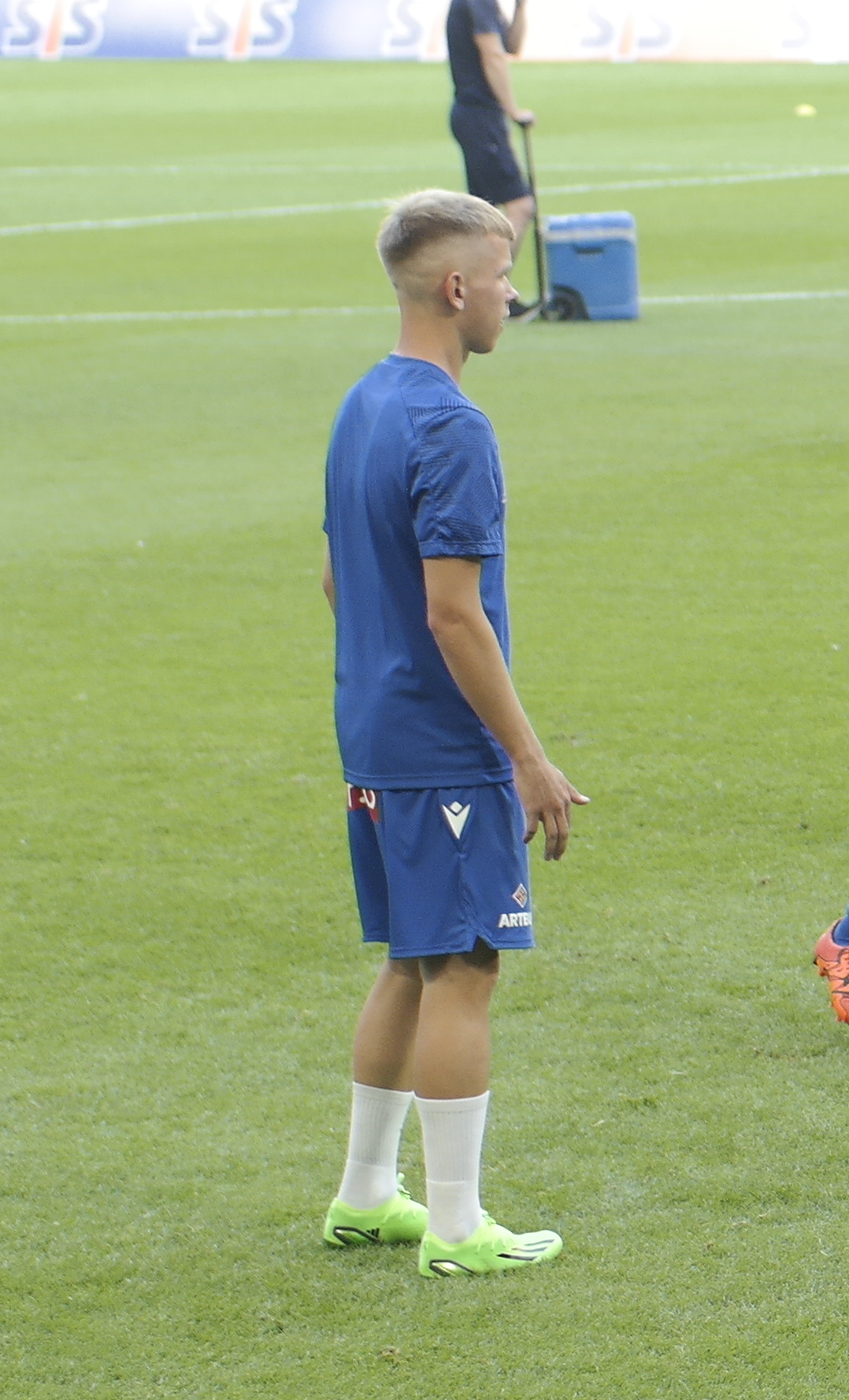
- Kozubal with Lech Poznań in 2022 during training

Personal information
- Date of birth: 18 August 2004 (age 22)
- Place of birth: Krosno, Poland
- Height: 1.76 m (5 ft 9 in)
- Position: Midfielder

Team information
- Current team: Lech Poznań
- Number: 43

Youth career
- –2017: Beniaminek Krosno
- 2017–2020: Lech Poznań

Senior career*
Years	Team	Apps	(Gls)
2020–2022	Lech Poznań II	37	(1)
2021–	Lech Poznań	77	(4)
2022	→ Górnik Polkowice (loan)	14	(0)
2023–2024	→ GKS Katowice (loan)	41	(6)

International career^{‡}
2017	Poland U14	1	(0)
2018	Poland U15	2	(0)
2019–2020	Poland U16	5	(1)
2022	Poland U18	5	(0)
2022–2023	Poland U19	11	(0)
2023–2024	Poland U20	4	(0)
2023–	Poland U21	19	(4)
2024	Poland	1	(0)
- * Club domestic league appearances and goals as of 14:54, 10 November 2026 (UTC) ‡ National team caps and goals as of 21:26, 19 November 2026 (UTC)

Antoni Kozubal (born 18 August 2004) is a Polish professional footballer who plays as a midfielder for Ekstraklasa club Lech Poznań.

== Club career ==
=== Early career ===
Kozubal started his career at Beniaminek Krosno. He trialed with Legia Warsaw and English club Manchester United before choosing to join Lech Poznań, a club he "dreamed of playing for", in 2017. He spent several years playing for Lech's youth sides before joining the under-19s roster for the 2020–21 season. Soon after, on 8 August 2020, he made his first appearance for Lech's reserves in a 3–2 Polish Cup win over Elana Toruń.

=== Lech Poznań ===
In January 2021, he was promoted to the first team. He made his debut on 14 March 2021, coming onto the pitch in the 84th minute of a goalless league draw against Piast Gliwice. With his sole first team appearance across the 2020–21 season, he became the second youngest player to feature for Lech, at the age of 16 years, six months and 24 days. Three days later, he extended his deal with Lech until 2024.

In the following campaign, he made one league and three cup appearances, while continuing to feature regularly in the II liga for the reserve side.

==== 2022: Loan to Górnik Polkowice ====
On 13 January 2022, Kozubal was sent on loan until the end of the season to the last-placed I liga club Górnik Polkowice. He made a total of 14 appearances as Górnik finished 17th and was unable to avoid relegation.

==== 2023–2024: Loan to GKS Katowice ====
The start of the 2022–23 season saw Kozubal with limited opportunities in the first team, as he made two substitute appearances against Dinamo Batumi in the UEFA Europa Conference League second qualifying round in July 2022. To find more playing time at a higher level of competition, Kozubal moved on loan to another I liga side GKS Katowice on 23 February 2023. He recorded one goal and one assist in eight games, and had his loan extended for a further year on 3 July.

During the 2023–24 season, Kozubal scored five goals and registered ten assists in 34 appearances. He was the league's top assist provider, as GKS finished the season in 2nd and won promotion, ending their 19-year absence from the top tier.

==== 2024–25: First team breakthrough ====
After returning to Poznań ahead of the 2024–25 campaign, Kozubal signed a new deal with Lech, keeping him at the club until mid-2028. He immediately established himself as a regular in Lech's line-up, and was voted Ekstraklasa's October Young Player of the Month. On 10 November 2024, he netted his first Ekstraklasa goal in a 5–2 home win over rivals Legia Warsaw. Kozubal appeared in all 34 of Lech's league games as they went on to win the 2024–25 Ekstraklasa.

== International career ==
Having represented several Poland youth teams, Kozubal received his first senior team call-up on 5 November 2024 for the UEFA Nations League matches against Portugal and Scotland. He debuted against the former opponent as a second-half substitute in a 5–1 away loss.

== Career statistics ==
=== Club ===
As of match played 8 November 2026

Appearances and goals by club, season and competition
Club	Season	League			Polish Cup		Europe		Other		Total	
Club	Season	Division	Apps	Goals	Apps	Goals	Apps	Goals	Apps	Goals	Apps	Goals
Lech Poznań II	2020–21	II liga	9	0	1	0	—		—		10	0
Lech Poznań II	2021–22	II liga	14	1	0	0	—		—		14	1
Lech Poznań II	2022–23	II liga	14	0	0	0	—		—		14	0
Lech Poznań II	Total		37	1	1	0	—		—		38	1
Lech Poznań	2020–21	Ekstraklasa	1	0	0	0	—		—		1	0
Lech Poznań	2021–22	Ekstraklasa	1	0	3	1	—		—		4	1
Lech Poznań	2022–23	Ekstraklasa	0	0	0	0	2 (Note: Appearances in UEFA Europa Conference League)	0	0	0	2	0
Lech Poznań	2024–25	Ekstraklasa	34	1	1	0	—		—		35	1
Lech Poznań	2025–26	Ekstraklasa	32	1	3	0	16 (Note: Four appearances in UEFA Champions League, two appearances in UEFA Europa League, ten appearances and two goals in UEFA Conference League)	2	1 (Note: Appearance in Polish Super Cup)	0	52	3
Lech Poznań	2026–27	Ekstraklasa	9	2	0	0	9 (Note: Two appearances in UEFA Champions League, seven appearances and one goal in UEFA Europa League)	1	1	1	19	4
Lech Poznań	Total		77	4	7	1	27	3	2	1	113	9
Górnik Polkowice (loan)	2021–22	I liga	14	0	0	0	—		—		14	0
GKS Katowice (loan)	2022–23	I liga	8	1	—		—		—		8	1
GKS Katowice (loan)	2023–24	I liga	33	5	1	0	—		—		34	5
GKS Katowice (loan)	Total		41	6	1	0	—		—		42	6
Career total			169	11	9	1	27	3	2	1	207	16

=== International ===
As of match played 15 November 2024

Appearances and goals by national team and year
National team	Year	Apps	Goals
Poland	2024	1	0
Total		1	0

== Honours ==
Lech Poznań

- Ekstraklasa: 2024–25, 2025–26
- Polish Super Cup: 2026

Individual

- Ekstraklasa Young Player of the Month: October 2024
