= Michał Gurgul =

Polish footballer

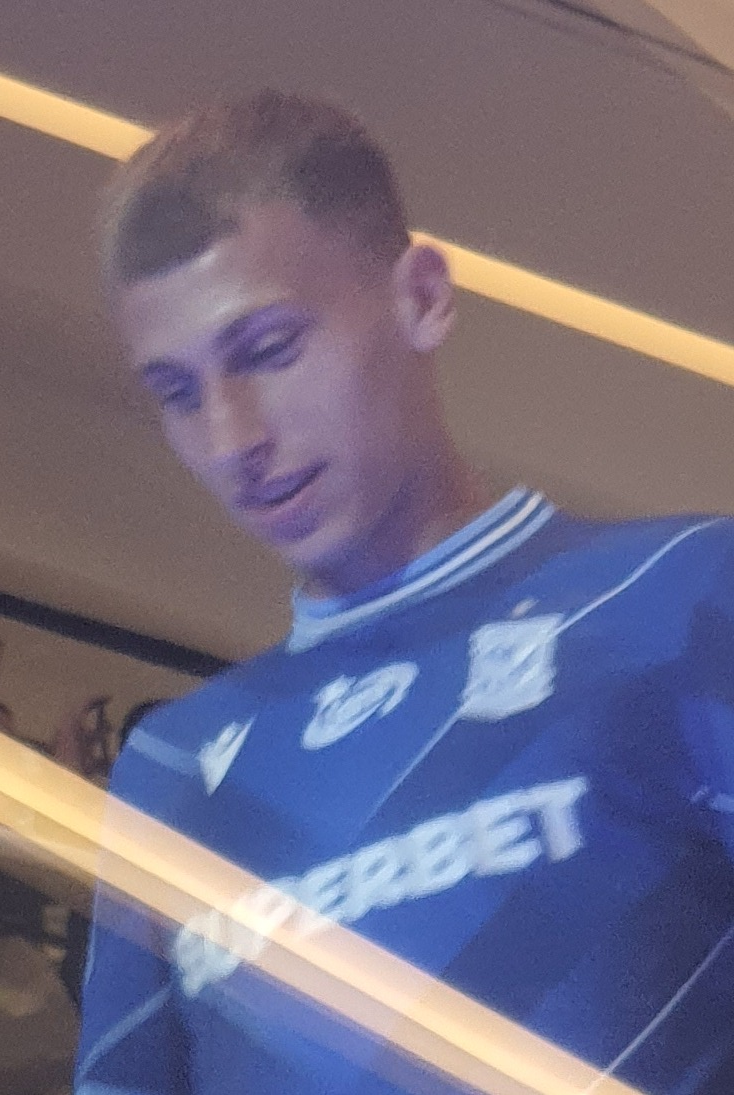
- Gurgul in 2023 with Lech Poznań

Personal information
- Full name: Michał Gurgul
- Date of birth: 30 January 2006 (age 20)
- Place of birth: Poznań, Poland
- Height: 1.83 m (6 ft 0 in)
- Position: Left-back

Team information
- Current team: Lech Poznań
- Number: 15

Youth career
- 2011–2017: AP Reissa Jarocin
- 2017–2023: Lech Poznań

Senior career*
Years	Team	Apps	(Gls)
2023–2025	Lech Poznań II	19	(0)
2023–	Lech Poznań	87	(3)

International career^{‡}
2019	Poland U14		
2021–2022	Poland U16	7	(0)
2022–2023	Poland U17	13	(0)
2023	Poland U18	5	(0)
2024–2025	Poland U19	8	(1)
2025–	Poland U21	13	(0)
Medal record
Men's football
Representing Poland
UEFA European Under-17 Championship
Bronze medal – third place	2023 Hungary
- * Club domestic league appearances and goals as of 08:46, 9 November 2026 (UTC) ‡ National team caps and goals as of 21:25, 19 November 2026 (UTC)

Michał Gurgul (born 30 January 2006) is a Polish professional footballer who plays as a left-back for Ekstraklasa club Lech Poznań.

== Club career ==
=== Early career ===
At the age of 5, Gurgul joined the Jarocin branch of Akademia Piłkarska Reissa. In 2017, he joined Lech Poznań's youth system.

With Gurgul as a regular in the starting line-up, Lech's U19 team won the 2022–23 Central Junior League title.

=== Senior level ===
Gurgul made his senior debut for Lech Poznań II on 28 February 2023 in a 2–0 league win against Radunia Stężyca. Less than two weeks later, on 12 March 2023, he made his first appearance for the senior team as a substitute in a 1–1 Ekstraklasa draw against Piast Gliwice. Two days later, it was announced he had signed a new three-year deal with the club.

On 30 April 2023, he was named in Lech's starting line-up for a league home game against Górnik Zabrze, which ended in a 0–1 loss.

In September 2023, following international break, he replaced Elias Andersson as the first-choice left-back in the team's line-up and started in every Ekstraklasa game played by Lech that month. On 28 September, Gurgul scored his first professional goal in a 4–1 win against defending champions Raków Częstochowa, levelling the score from close range in the 6th minute.

== International career ==
Gurgul received his first call-up to the Poland U14s in 2019. At the 2023 UEFA European Under-17 Championship, he appeared in all five games played by the under-17 team as they reached the semi-finals and secured a spot at the 2023 FIFA U-17 World Cup. He was part of the squad for the tournament played in Indonesia, and appeared in all three games played by the Polish U17s.

He then made his debut for the under-18s as a substitute in a friendly against Croatia on 6 September 2023.

After serving as captain of the Poland under-19s in 2024, on 5 November he received his maiden senior team call-up for the UEFA Nations League matches against Portugal and Scotland later that month, appearing on the bench once against the latter.

Gurgul made his debut with the under-21 team in its first match at the 2025 UEFA European Under-21 Championship, playing the full length of a 1–2 loss to Georgia on 11 June 2025.

== Career statistics ==
As of match played 8 November 2026

Appearances and goals by club, season and competition
Club	Season	League			Polish Cup		Europe		Other		Total	
Club	Season	Division	Apps	Goals	Apps	Goals	Apps	Goals	Apps	Goals	Apps	Goals
Lech Poznań II	2022–23	II liga	7	0	0	0	—		—		7	0
Lech Poznań II	2023–24	II liga	11	0	0	0	—		—		11	0
Lech Poznań II	2025–26	III liga, group II	1	0	—		—		—		1	0
Lech Poznań II	Total		19	0	0	0	—		—		19	0
Lech Poznań	2022–23	Ekstraklasa	3	0	0	0	0	0	0	0	3	0
Lech Poznań	2023–24	Ekstraklasa	10	1	0	0	1 (Note: Appearance in UEFA Europa Conference League)	0	—		11	1
Lech Poznań	2024–25	Ekstraklasa	30	0	1	0	—		—		31	0
Lech Poznań	2025–26	Ekstraklasa	31	1	1	0	12 (Note: Two appearances in UEFA Champions League, two appearances in UEFA Europa League, eight appearances in UEFA Conference League)	0	1 (Note: Appearance in Polish Super Cup)	0	45	1
Lech Poznań	2026–27	Ekstraklasa	13	1	1	0	10 (Note: Two appearances in UEFA Champions League, eight appearances in UEFA Europa League)	0	1	0	25	1
Lech Poznań	Total		87	3	3	0	23	0	2	0	115	3
Career total			106	3	3	0	23	0	2	0	134	3

== Honours ==
Lech Poznań

- Ekstraklasa: 2024–25, 2025–26
- Polish Super Cup: 2026

Individual

- Ekstraklasa Young Player of the Month: April 2026, October 2026
