= Gísli Þórðarson =

Icelandic footballer (born 2004)

Personal information
- Full name: Gísli Gottskálk Þórðarson
- Date of birth: 12 September 2004 (age 22)
- Place of birth: Reykjavík, Iceland
- Height: 1.91 m (6 ft 3 in)
- Position: Central midfielder

Team information
- Current team: FC St. Pauli (on loan from Lech Poznań)
- Number: 5

Youth career
- –2021: Breiðablik
- 2020–2021: → Bologna (loan)
- 2021–2022: Bologna

Senior career*
Years	Team	Apps	(Gls)
2022–2025	Víkingur Reykjavik	40	(2)
2025–	Lech Poznań	18	(2)
2026–	→ FC St. Pauli (loan)	0	(0)

International career^{‡}
2021–2023	Iceland U19	11	(0)
2024	Iceland U20	2	(0)
2024–	Iceland U21	6	(0)
2025–	Iceland	4	(0)
- * Club domestic league appearances and goals as of 21:01, 25 May 2026 (UTC) ‡ National team caps and goals as of 06:58, 10 June 2026 (UTC)

Gísli Gottskálk Þórðarson (born 12 September 2004) is an Icelandic professional footballer who plays as a central midfielder for 2. Bundesliga club FC St. Pauli, on loan from Ekstraklasa side Lech Poznań, and the Iceland national team.

== Club career ==
=== Early career ===
Born in Reykjavík, Gísli spent his early years in the Breiðablik youth teams, before joining Italian side Bologna on a one-year loan in 2020. After his loan spell ended, he was signed by Bologna on a permanent basis and remained in Italy for another twelve months.

=== Víkingur Reykjavik ===
In July 2022, Gísli returned to Iceland and joined top-flight side Víkingur Reykjavik. During his two-and-a-half-year stint with Vikingur, he aided the club to a league title win in 2023, two Icelandic Cup wins, one Icelandic Super Cup victory, and made six appearances in the 2024–25 UEFA Conference League league phase.

=== Lech Poznań ===
On 7 January 2025, Gísli signed a four-and-a-half-year contract with Polish Ekstraklasa club Lech Poznań. He made his professional debut for Lech on 31 January, starting in a 4–1 league win over Widzew Łódź. On 11 March 2025, Lech announced Gísli would miss the rest of the season due to a shoulder injury sustained during training.

Gísli joined 2. Bundesliga side FC St. Pauli on loan on 7 August 2026, with St. Pauli having an option to sign him permanently. His move came two days after the departure of Jackson Irvine and two days before St. Pauli's first match of the 2026–27 season against Greuther Fürth.

== International career ==
Gísli was first capped for Iceland at the under-19 level, appearing as a substitute in a 3–0 loss to Switzerland on 6 September 2021. In 2024, he made his debuts for the Iceland under-20 and under-21 teams.

Gísli earned his first senior cap for the senior national team on 10 October 2025, coming on as a substitute in the 86th minute of a 3–5 FIFA World Cup qualifier loss against Ukraine.

== Career statistics ==
=== Club ===
As of match played 29 July 2026

Appearances and goals by club, season and competition
Club	Season	League			National cup (Note: Includes Icelandic Cup, Polish Cup)		Europe		Other		Total	
Club	Season	Division	Apps	Goals	Apps	Goals	Apps	Goals	Apps	Goals	Apps	Goals
Víkingur Reykjavik	2022	Besta deild karla	5	0	1	0	—		—		6	0
Víkingur Reykjavik	2023	Besta deild karla	11	0	2	0	0	0	4 (Note: Three appearances in Icelandic League Cup, one appearance in Icelandic Super Cup)	0	14	0
Víkingur Reykjavik	2024	Besta deild karla	24	2	5	0	14 (Note: Two appearances in UEFA Champions League, twelve appearances in UEFA Conference League)	0	3 (Note: Two appearances in Icelandic League Cup, one appearance in Icelandic Super Cup)	0	44	2
Víkingur Reykjavik	Total		40	2	8	0	14	0	7	0	69	2
Lech Poznań	2024–25	Ekstraklasa	5	0	—		—		—		5	0
Lech Poznań	2025–26	Ekstraklasa	13	2	3	0	11 (Note: Four appearances in UEFA Champions League, two appearances in UEFA Europa League, five appearances in UEFA Conference League)	0	0	0	27	2
Lech Poznań	2026–27	Ekstraklasa	0	0	0	0	1 (Note: Appearance in UEFA Champions League)	0	1 (Note: Appearance in Polish Super Cup)	0	2	0
Lech Poznań	Total		18	2	3	0	12	0	1	0	34	2
Career total			58	4	11	0	26	0	8	0	103	4

=== International ===
As of match played 9 June 2026

Appearances and goals by national team and year
National team	Year	Apps	Goals
Iceland	2025	2	0
Iceland	2026	2	0
Total		4	0

== Honours ==
Víkingur Reykjavik

- Besta deild karla: 2023
- Icelandic Cup: 2022, 2023
- Icelandic Super Cup: 2024

Lech Poznań

- Ekstraklasa: 2024–25, 2025–26
- Polish Super Cup: 2026
