= Yannick Agnero =

Ivorian footballer

Personal information
- Full name: Mel Yannick Joel Agnero
- Date of birth: 20 February 2003 (age 23)
- Place of birth: Abobo, Ivory Coast
- Height: 1.87 m (6 ft 2 in)
- Position: Forward

Team information
- Current team: Lech Poznań
- Number: 7

Youth career
- Right to Dream
- 2021–2022: Nordsjælland

Senior career*
Years	Team	Apps	(Gls)
2021–2024	Nordsjælland	3	(0)
2023	→ Fremad Amager (loan)	9	(0)
2024	→ Helsingør (loan)	10	(1)
2024–2025	Halmstads BK	30	(9)
2025–	Lech Poznań	41	(8)
- * Club domestic league appearances and goals as of 16:05, 22 November 2026 (UTC)

Mel Yannick Joel Agnero (born 20 February 2003) is an Ivorian professional footballer who plays as a forward for Polish Ekstraklasa club Lech Poznań.

== Club career ==
=== Early years ===
Agnero was born in Ivory Coast and was a part of the Right to Dream Academy before joining FC Nordsjælland in the summer of 2021.

=== FC Nordsjælland ===
Agnero made his professional debut for Nordsjaelland on 22 October 2021 against Vejle Boldklub. In the summer 2022, Agnero was permanently promoted to Nordsjælland senior squad.

On transfer deadline day, 31 January 2023, Agnero joined Danish 1st Division side Fremad Amager on a loan deal for the rest of the season. After his return to Nordsjælland, Agnero did not feature in the club's squad. On 1 February 2024, Agnero was loaned to Danish 1st Division side FC Helsingør until the end of the season. After finishing his loan spell, Agnero returned to Nordsjælland.

At the end of July 2024, it was revealed that Agnero was on trial at Swedish club Halmstads BK.

=== Halmstads BK ===
On 2 August 2024, Agnero was transferred to Halmstads BK.

=== Lech Poznań ===
On 2 September 2025, Agnero moved to Polish Ekstraklasa club Lech Poznań on a deal until June 2030 for a reported club record fee of €2.3 million. He scored his first goal for the club on 23 November in a 4–1 league win over Radomiak Radom.

== Career statistics ==
As of match played 22 November 2026

Appearances and goals by club, season and competition
Club	Season	League			National cup (Note: Includes Svenska Cupen, Polish Cup)		Europe		Other		Total	
Club	Season	Division	Apps	Goals	Apps	Goals	Apps	Goals	Apps	Goals	Apps	Goals
Nordsjælland	2021–22	Danish Superliga	3	0	0	0	—		—		3	0
Nordsjælland	2022–23	Danish Superliga	0	0	0	0	—		—		0	0
Nordsjælland	Total		3	0	0	0	—		—		3	0
Fremad Amager (loan)	2022–23	Danish 1st Division	9	0	0	0	—		—		9	0
Helsingør (loan)	2023–24	Danish 1st Division	10	1	0	0	—		—		10	1
Halmstads BK	2024	Allsvenskan	11	4	—		—		—		11	4
Halmstads BK	2025	Allsvenskan	19	5	3	1	—		—		22	6
Halmstads BK	Total		30	9	3	1	—		—		33	10
Lech Poznań	2025–26	Ekstraklasa	27	3	3	1	10 (Note: Appearances in UEFA Conference League)	1	—		40	5
Lech Poznań	2026–27	Ekstraklasa	14	5	1	0	8 (Note: Two appearances in UEFA Champions League, six appearances and one goal in UEFA Europa League)	1	1 (Note: Appearance in Polish Super Cup)	0	24	6
Lech Poznań	Total		41	8	4	1	18	2	1	0	64	11
Career total			93	18	7	2	18	2	1	0	119	22

== Honours ==
Lech Poznań

- Ekstraklasa: 2025–26
- Polish Super Cup: 2026
