= Terry Yegbe =

Ghanaian footballer (born 2001)

Personal information
- Date of birth: 25 January 2001 (age 25)
- Place of birth: Akatsi, Ghana
- Height: 1.95 m (6 ft 5 in)
- Position: Centre-back

Team information
- Current team: Lech Poznań
- Number: 59

Youth career
- Kickers FC
- WAFA
- Vision

Senior career*
| Years | Team | Apps | (Gls) |
| 2018–2020 | WAFA | 9 | (0) |
| 2020–2022 | Vision | 12 | (0) |
| 2022 | → SJK II (loan) | 21 | (1) |
| 2023 | SJK | 25 | (0) |
| 2024–2025 | Elfsborg | 40 | (4) |
| 2025–2026 | Metz | 24 | (0) |
| 2026– | Lech Poznań | 7 | (0) |

International career^{‡}
| 2023 | Ghana U23 | 3 | (0) |
| 2024– | Ghana | 2 | (0) |
- * Club domestic league appearances and goals as of 10:54, 16 November 2026 (UTC) ‡ National team caps and goals as of 14:58, 23 June 2026 (UTC)

Terry Yegbe (born 25 January 2001) is a Ghanaian professional footballer who plays as a centre-back for Ekstraklasa club Lech Poznań and the Ghana national team.

== Early career ==
Born in Akatsi, Yegbe started to play football in a youth team of local Division Two side Kickers FC. He was scouted by a Sogakope-based Ghana Premier League club West African Football Academy (WAFA), and was offered a contract to their academy in August 2018. Yegbe made his senior debut with the club's first team in Ghana Premier League in 2019. After his contract expired with WAFA, Yegbe moved to Accra to the Division One club Vision FC, where he spent two years, before moving to Finland.

== Club career ==
=== SJK Seinäjoki ===
In March 2022, Yegbe was first loaned out to SJK Seinäjoki in Finland with a purchase option, and was initially registered to their academy squad SJK II, playing in the Finnish second tier, Ykkönen.

On 27 November 2022, his loan was extended until the end of 2023 and he was promoted to the first team. After a highly successful start to the season in Veikkausliiga, his loan was cut short and he signed a permanent contract with SJK, on a deal until the end of 2027, for an undisclosed fee. Yegbe quickly established his place in the starting line-up and became an integral part of the SJK defense.

On 8 June 2023, in the Ostrobothnia derby (Finnish: Pohjanmaan derby) match against Vaasan Palloseura (VPS), Yegbe gained a wide recognition as he indirectly scored a goal with his long throw-in on the 2nd minute of the game. The ball went in the net by the fingers of VPS goalkeeper Teppo Marttinen, and it was registered as an own goal.

=== Elfsborg ===
On 13 December 2023, it was announced that Yegbe would join Swedish side IF Elfsborg from 1 January 2024, signing a contract until the end of the 2028 season. The deal reportedly commanded a transfer fee in the region of 6.8-7.9 million SEK, which roughly corresponds to €600,000-700,000. SJK also secured a 15% re-sale clause.

On 1 April 2024, Yegbe made his official debut for Elfsborg, in a 2024 Allsvenskan season opening game against IFK Värnamo. On 5 May 2024, in a match against Sirius, Yegbe was sent off by a red card for elbowing Yousef Salech in the stomach. Later he received a four-game ban for the incident. Yegbe scored his first goals in Allsvenskan on 14 July 2024 by a brace, helping his side to a 5–3 away win against BK Häcken. Yegbe also represented Elfsborg in the 2024–25 UEFA Europa League new league phase.

=== Metz ===
At the end of August 2025, Yegbe joined Ligue 1 club Metz for a transfer fee of €3 million.

=== Lech Poznań ===
On 25 June 2026, Yegbe moved to Ekstraklasa club Lech Poznań on a four-year contract, for a reported fee of €3 million. He made his official debut on 16 July 2026, playing the full 90 minutes in a 3–1 Polish Super Cup win over Górnik Zabrze. In the following game, on 21 July, he scored his first goal for the club, in the first leg of the second qualifying round of the 2026–27 UEFA Champions League, a long-range shot in the 61st minute against Danish club AGF.

== International career ==
Yegbe got a call up to Ghana U23 national team for the 2023 U-23 Africa Cup of Nations tournament in the summer 2023. He played in all three of the group stage matches against Morocco, Congo and Guinea. Ghana finished 3rd in the group and was eventually knocked out of the competition.

Yegbe made his debut for the Ghana national team on 18 November 2024, in an Africa Cup of Nations qualifier against Niger at the Accra Sports Stadium. He started the game and played 79 minutes, as Niger won 2–1.

== Personal life ==
Yegbe has named David Alaba his idol in football.

== Career statistics ==
=== Club ===
As of match played 8 November 2026

Appearances and goals by club, season and competition
| Club | Season | Division | League | | National cup (Note: Includes Suomen Cup, Svenska Cupen, Polish Cup) | | League cup (Note: Includes Ykkönen Cup, Finnish League Cup) | | Continental | | Other | | Total | |
| Club | Season | Division | Apps | Goals | Apps | Goals | Apps | Goals | Apps | Goals | Apps | Goals | Apps | Goals |
|---|---|---|---|---|---|---|---|---|---|---|---|---|---|---|
| WAFA | 2019 | Ghana Premier League | 9 | 0 | 0 | 0 | — | | — | | — | | 9 | 0 |
| Vision | 2021–22 | Ghana Division One | 12 | 0 | 0 | 0 | — | | — | | — | | 12 | 0 |
| SJK Akatemia (loan) | 2022 | Ykkönen | 21 | 1 | 2 | 0 | 1 | 0 | — | | — | | 24 | 1 |
| SJK Akatemia (loan) | 2023 | Ykkönen | 0 | 0 | 0 | 0 | 1 | 0 | — | | — | | 1 | 0 |
| SJK Akatemia (loan) | Total | | 21 | 1 | 2 | 0 | 2 | 0 | 0 | 0 | 0 | 0 | 25 | 1 |
| SJK | 2023 | Veikkausliiga | 25 | 0 | 1 | 0 | 3 | 1 | — | | — | | 29 | 1 |
| Elfsborg | 2024 | Allsvenskan | 22 | 3 | 1 | 0 | — | | 14 (Note: Appearances in UEFA Europa League) | 0 | — | | 37 | 3 |
| Elfsborg | 2025 | Allsvenskan | 18 | 1 | 4 | 0 | — | | 2 | 0 | — | | 24 | 1 |
| Elfsborg | Total | | 40 | 4 | 6 | 0 | 0 | 0 | 16 | 0 | 0 | 0 | 63 | 4 |
| Metz | 2025–26 | Ligue 1 | 24 | 0 | 0 | 0 | — | | — | | — | | 24 | 0 |
| Lech Poznań | 2026–27 | Ekstraklasa | 7 | 0 | 1 | 0 | — | | 8 (Note: Two appearances and one goal in UEFA Champions League, six appearances in UEFA Europa League) | 1 | 1 (Note: Appearance in Polish Super Cup) | 0 | 17 | 1 |
| Career total | | | 138 | 5 | 8 | 0 | 5 | 1 | 24 | 1 | 1 | 0 | 176 | 7 |

=== International ===
As of match played 22 May 2026

Appearances and goals by national team and year
| National team | Year | Apps | Goals |
|---|---|---|---|
| Ghana | 2024 | 1 | 0 |
| Ghana | 2025 | 0 | 0 |
| Ghana | 2026 | 1 | 0 |
| Total | | 2 | 0 |

== Honours ==
Lech Poznań

- Polish Super Cup: 2026
