= Allahyar Sayyadmanesh =

Iranian footballer (born 2001)

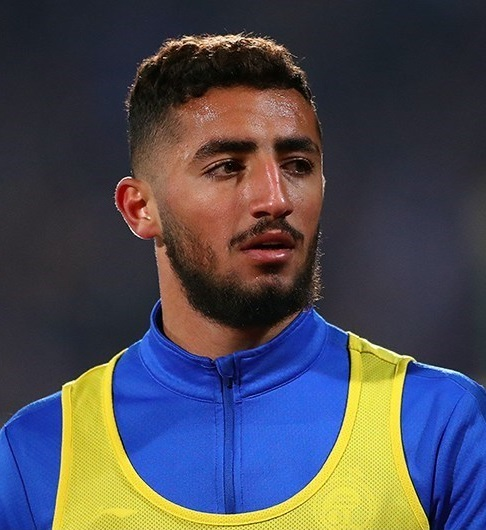
- Sayyadmanesh with Esteghlal in 2018

Personal information
- Date of birth: 29 June 2001 (age 25)
- Place of birth: Amol, Iran
- Height: 1.82 m (6 ft 0 in)
- Positions: Forward; winger

Team information
- Current team: Lech Poznań
- Number: 17

Youth career
- 2011–2015: Arash Amol
- 2015–2017: Padideh Sari
- 2017–2018: Saipa

Senior career*
Years	Team	Apps	(Gls)
2018–2019	Esteghlal	15	(2)
2019–2022	Fenerbahçe	2	(0)
2019	→ İstanbulspor (loan)	7	(0)
2020–2021	→ Zorya Luhansk (loan)	35	(12)
2022	→ Hull City (loan)	12	(1)
2022–2024	Hull City	25	(2)
2024–2026	Westerlo	81	(14)
2026–	Lech Poznań	8	(5)

International career^{‡}
2016–2017	Iran U17	12	(9)
2018–2023	Iran U23	9	(4)
2019–	Iran	9	(1)
Medal record
Representing Iran
AFC U-17 Asian Cup
Runner-up	2016 India
- * Club domestic league appearances and goals as of 20:14, 20 September 2026 (UTC) ‡ National team caps and goals as of 10:36, 14 October 2025 (UTC)

Allahyar Sayyadmanesh (Persian: اللهیار صیادمنش; born 29 June 2001) is an Iranian professional footballer who plays as a forward and winger for Ekstraklasa club Lech Poznań and the Iran national team.

In 2018, he was named by The Guardian as one of the 60 best young talents in world football.

== Club career ==
=== Early years ===
Sayyadmanesh started to play club football when he was 8. He began his career at Arash Amol, where he was top goalscorer in Iran's under-10 league. After four years, he joined Padideh Sari, where he spent two years. He later spent a year in Saipa's youth academy.

=== Esteghlal ===
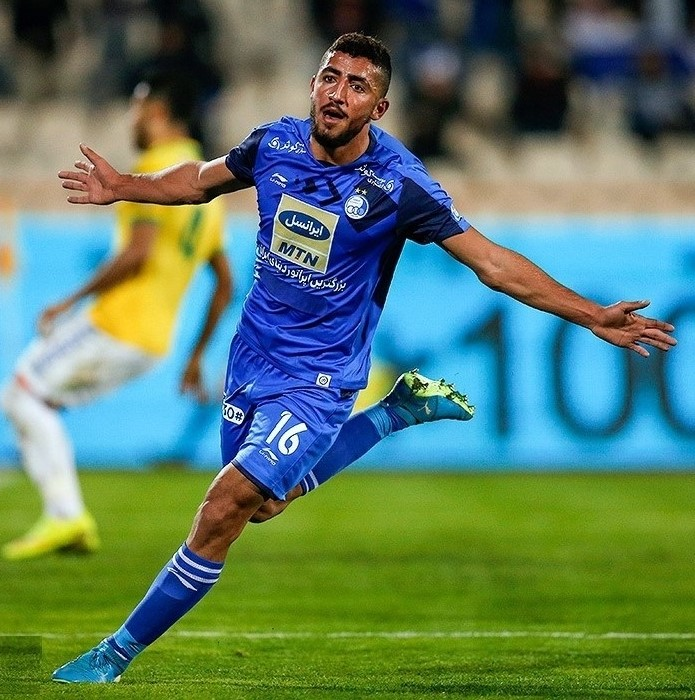
Sayyadmanesh playing for Esteghlal in 2018

On 12 June 2018, Sayyadmanesh signed a five-year contract with Esteghlal. He was assigned the number 16 shirt, previously worn by Mehdi Ghaedi, who decided to change his number.

=== Fenerbahçe ===
On 3 May 2019, Sayyadmanesh signed a five-year contract with Turkish club Fenerbahçe in a $850,000 transfer. He was loaned to TFF 1. League club İstanbulspor on 2 September 2019 on a season-long loan. Sayyadmanesh left Fenerbahçe on 9 July 2022 to join English Club Hull City.

=== Zorya Luhansk ===
On 6 October 2020, Sayyadmanesh was loaned to Ukrainian club Zorya Luhansk on a year-and-a-half long deal, with an option to buy him for €3.5 million. On 25 October 2020, he scored on his league debut for Zorya in a 4–0 win against Rukh Lviv. On 3 December 2020, he scored the winning goal in a 1–0 win against English Premier League club Leicester City in the group stage of the Europa League. Sayyadmanesh was selected to be among the Ukraine Premier League's best eleven players of the 2020–21 season.

=== Hull City ===
On 31 January 2022, Sayyadmanesh was loaned to English club Hull City on a half-year deal until the end of the 2021–22 season. He made his debut on 5 February 2022 in the home match against Preston North End when he came on as an 84th-minute substitute for Richie Smallwood. On 15 April 2022, Sayyadmanesh scored on his league debut for Hull City in a 2–1 win against Cardiff City.

On 9 July 2022, Sayyadmanesh signed permanently for the English club Hull City from Turkish side Fenerbahçe with transfer fee €4.5 million. He signed a four-year contract with an option of a further year.

=== Westerlo ===
On 31 January 2024, Sayyadmanesh signed for Belgian Pro League club Westerlo on a two-and-a-half-year deal for an undisclosed fee.

=== Lech Poznań ===
On 19 June 2026, Sayyadmanesh signed for Ekstraklasa club Lech Poznań on a free transfer. He signed a three-year contract, and joined fellow Iran international Ali Gholizadeh. He made his debut on 16 July in a 3–1 Polish Super Cup victory over Górnik Zabrze, entering the pitch in the 79th minute. Sayyadmanesh scored his first goal for Lech two weeks later, on 1 August, in a 2–1 league win against Wieczysta Kraków.

== International career ==
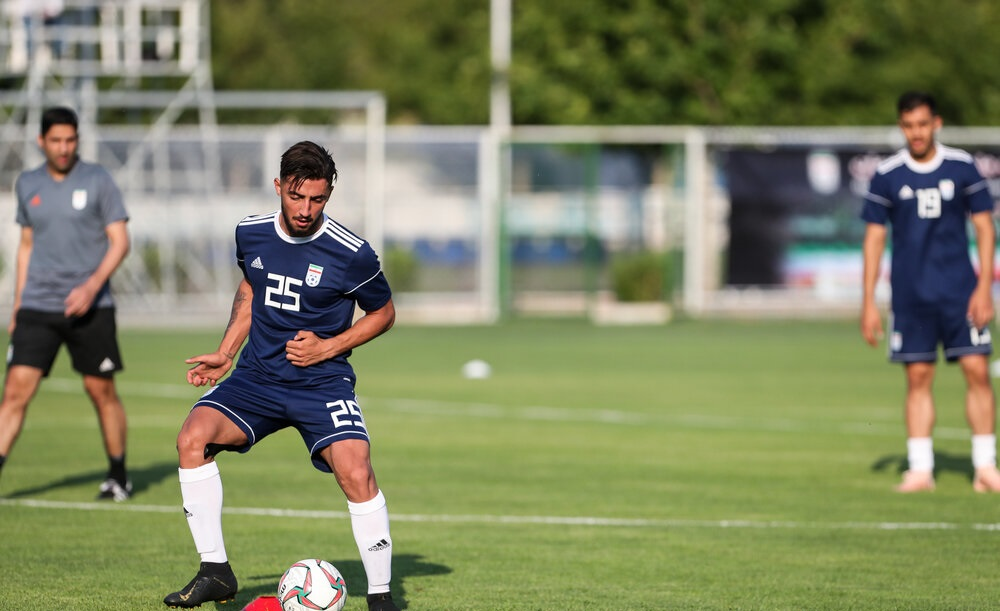
Sayyadmanesh with the Iran national team in 2019

Sayyadmanesh was a member of the Iran U17 national team which qualified for the 2017 FIFA U-17 World Cup quarter-final in India.

He made his senior national team debut on 6 June 2019, in a friendly against Syria, as an 80th-minute substitute for Karim Ansarifard. Nine minutes after coming on, he scored the last goal of the game in a 5–0 victory. The goal broke Saeid Ezatolahi's record of the youngest goalscorer in Iran national team's history by almost two years. Since his debut, Sayyadmanesh has been in and out of the national team.

In September 2026, Sayyadmanesh announced he won't play for Iran as long as Ghalenoi is the coach, in an interview with Iranian State TV.

== Personal life ==
0n 11 January 2026, Sayyadmanesh publicly came out in support of the 2025–2026 Iranian protests by stating: "Pray for the brave people of Iran". He also has a tattoo with the phrase "King of Kings" under a map of Iran.

== Career statistics ==
=== Club ===
As of match played 20 September 2026

Appearances and goals by club, season and competition
Club	Season	League			National cup (Note: Includes Hazfi Cup, Turkish Cup, Ukrainian Cup, FA Cup, Belgian Cup)		Continental		Other		Total	
Club	Season	Division	Apps	Goals	Apps	Goals	Apps	Goals	Apps	Goals	Apps	Goals
Esteghlal	2018–19	Persian Gulf Pro League	15	2	2	0	1 (Note: Appearance(s) in AFC Champions League)	0	—		18	2
Fenerbahçe	2019–20	Süper Lig	2	0	1	0	—		—		3	0
İstanbulspor (loan)	2019–20	TFF First League	7	0	4	1	—		—		11	1
Zorya Luhansk (loan)	2020–21	Ukrainian Premier League	19	5	3	0	4 (Note: Appearance(s) in UEFA Europa League)	1	—		26	6
Zorya Luhansk (loan)	2021–22	Ukrainian Premier League	16	7	0	0	8 (Note: Two appearances in UEFA Europa League, six appearances and two goals in UEFA Europa Conference League)	2	—		24	9
Zorya Luhansk (loan)	Total		35	12	3	0	12	3	—		82	18
Hull City (loan)	2021–22	EFL Championship	12	1	0	0	—		—		12	1
Hull City	2022–23	EFL Championship	19	2	0	0	—		1 (Note: Appearance in EFL Cup)	0	20	2
Hull City	2023–24	EFL Championship	6	0	2	0	—		—		8	0
Hull City	Total		37	3	2	0	—		1	0	40	3
Westerlo	2023–24	Belgian Pro League	7	0	0	0	—		9 (Note: Appearances in Jupiler Pro League Europe playoffs)	0	16	0
Westerlo	2024–25	Belgian Pro League	26	6	2	0	—		9	1	37	7
Westerlo	2025–26	Belgian Pro League	24	5	1	0	—		6	2	31	7
Westerlo	Total		57	11	3	0	0	0	24	3	84	14
Lech Poznań	2026–27	Ekstraklasa	8	5	0	0	6 (Note: One appearance in UEFA Champions League, five appearances and two goals in UEFA Europa League)	2	1 (Note: Appearance in Polish Super Cup)	0	15	7
Career total			161	33	15	1	19	5	26	3	221	42

=== International ===
As of match played 14 October 2025

Appearances and goals by national team and year
National team	Year	Apps	Goals
Iran	2019	1	1
Iran	2021	3	0
Iran	2022	3	0
Iran	2024	1	0
Iran	2025	1	0
Total		9	1

Scores and results list Iran's goal tally first, score column indicates score after each Sayyadmanesh goal.

List of international goals scored by Allahyar Sayyadmanesh
No.	Date	Venue	Opponent	Score	Result	Competition
1	6 June 2019	Azadi Stadium, Tehran, Iran	Syria	5–0	5–0	Friendly

== Honours ==
Zorya Luhansk

- Ukrainian Cup runner-up: 2020–21

Iran U16

- AFC U-16 Championship runner-up: 2016

Lech Poznań

- Polish Super Cup: 2026

Individual

- Iranian Young Player of the Year: 2019
- Ukrainian Premier League Player of the Month: February 2021
- Hull City Player of the Month: April 2022
