= 2026 Polish Super Cup =

Football competition

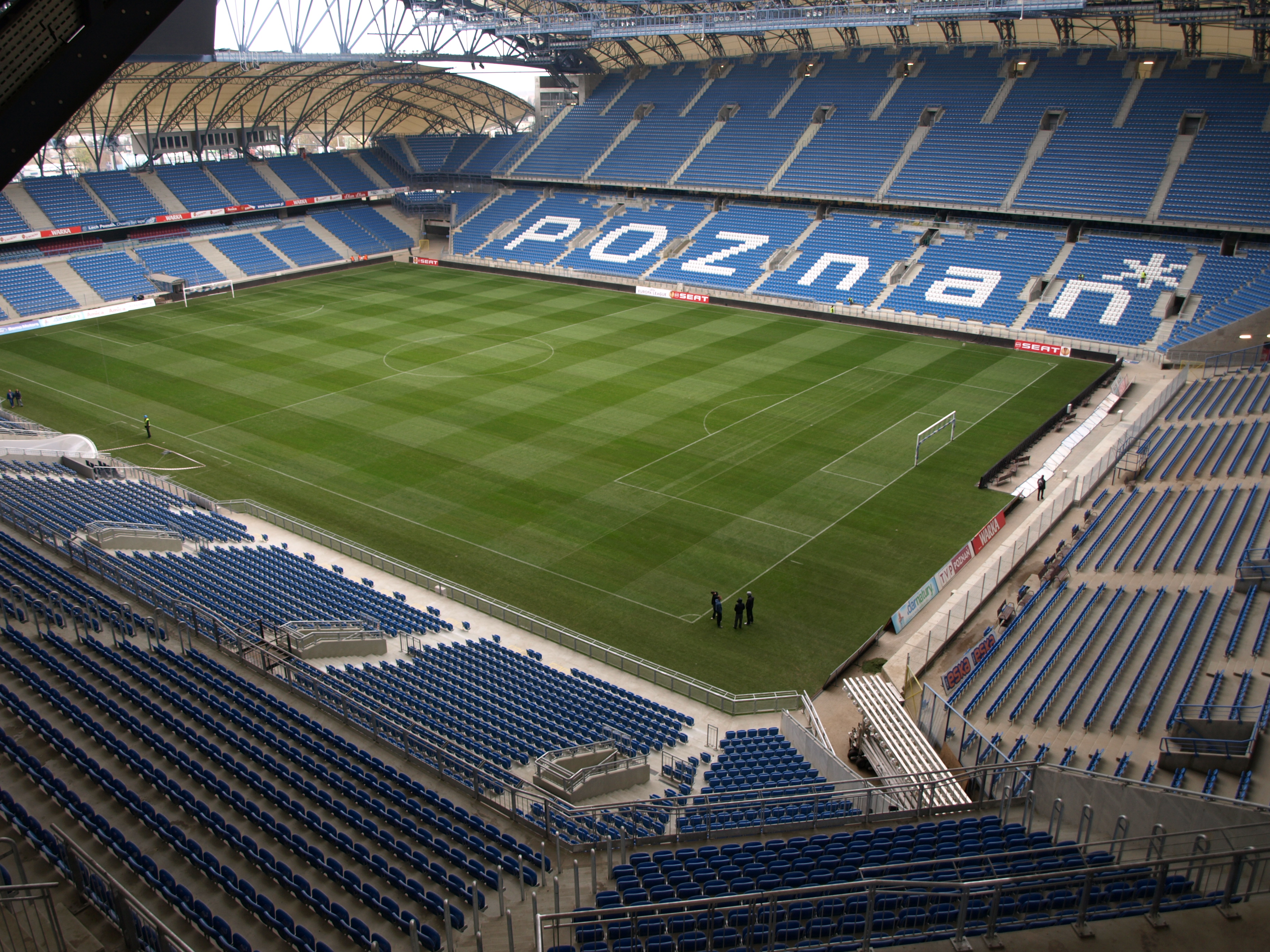
- The Enea Stadion in Poznań hosted the final.
Lech Poznań	Górnik Zabrze
3	1
- Date: 16 July 2026
- Venue: Enea Stadion, Poznań
- Referee: Damian Kos (Gdańsk)
- Attendance: 37,843

The 2026 Polish Super Cup was the 35th Polish Super Cup, an annual Polish football match played between the reigning winners of the Ekstraklasa and Polish Cup.

The 2025–26 Ekstraklasa champions Lech Poznań faced 2025–26 Polish Cup winners Górnik Zabrze.

Górnik Zabrze scored the opening goal of the match, but Lech Poznań turned the game around by scoring three times - once before the break and twice in the second half. This secured their 7th Polish Super Cup title, reclaiming their position as the club with the most Polish Super Cup wins in history.

== Match ==
16 July 2026
19:00 CEST (UTC+02:00)

Lech Poznań	3–1	Górnik Zabrze
Kozubal 27'; Ishak 47'; Rodríguez 69'	90minut.pl PZPN	Khlan 14'

Enea Stadion, Poznań
Attendance: 37,843
Referee: Damian Kos (Gdańsk)

Lech Poznań	Górnik Zabrze

GK	1	(Poland) Mateusz Lis
LB	15	(Poland) Michał Gurgul
CB	59	(Ghana) Terry Yegbe
CB	27	(Poland) Wojciech Mońka
RB	2	(Portugal) Joel Pereira
DM	22	(Poland) Radosław Murawski		(substituted off) 65'
CM	43	(Poland) Antoni Kozubal	(yellow card) 71'	(substituted off) 73'
CM	21	(Spain) Pablo Rodríguez		(substituted off) 79'
LW	77	(Honduras) Luis Palma
CF	9	(Sweden) Mikael Ishak (c)		(substituted off) 65'
RW	10	(Sweden) Patrik Wålemark		(substituted off) 65'
Substitutes:
GK	41	(Poland) Bartosz Mrozek
DF	4	(Portugal) João Moutinho
DF	20	(Poland) Robert Gumny
DF	72	(Poland) Mateusz Skrzypczak
MF	14	(Sweden) Leo Bengtsson	(substituted on) 65'
MF	17	(Iran) Allahyar Sayyadmanesh	(substituted on) 79'
MF	23	(Iceland) Gísli Þórðarson	(substituted on) 73'	(yellow card) 76'
MF	24	(Poland) Filip Jagiełło	(substituted on) 65'
FW	7	(Ivory Coast) Yannick Agnero	(substituted on) 65'
Manager:
(Denmark) Niels Frederiksen

GK	1	(Germany) Philipp Schulze
LB	64	(Slovenia) Erik Janža (c)		(substituted off) 66'
CB	20	(Spain) Josema
CB	26	(Poland) Rafał Janicki
RB	61	(Czech Republic) Michal Sáček	(yellow card) 89'
DM	18	(Czech Republic) Lukáš Sadílek
CM	14	(Poland) Jarosław Kubicki		(substituted off) 41'
CM	82	(Poland) Kacper Urbański		(substituted off) 73'
LW	33	(Ukraine) Maksym Khlan
CF	11	(Slovakia) Erik Prekop		(substituted off) 65'
RW	88	(Nigeria) Taofeek Ismaheel		(substituted off) 66'
Substitutes:
GK	99	(Poland) Tomasz Loska
DF	2	(Poland) Patryk Warczak
DF	4	(Poland) Paweł Bochniewicz
DF	5	(Poland) Kryspin Szcześniak
DF	21	(Czech Republic) Ondřej Zmrzlý	(substituted on) 66'
MF	7	(France) Yvan Ikia Dimi	(substituted on) 66'
MF	28	(France) Bastien Donio	(substituted on) 41'	(yellow card) 45+1'
MF	34	(Croatia) Bruno Durdov	(substituted on) 73'
FW	23	(Norway) Sondre Liseth	(substituted on) 65'
Manager:
(Slovakia) Michal Gašparík

Match officials:
Referee:
Damian Kos
Assistant referees:
Marcin Boniek
Dariusz Bohonos
Fourth official:
Łukasz Kuźma
Video assistant referee:
Bartosz Frankowski
Damian Sylwestrzak

Match rules

- 90 minutes.
- Penalty shoot-out if scores still level.
- Nine named substitutes.
- Maximum of five substitutions.

== See also ==
- 2026–27 Ekstraklasa
- 2026–27 Polish Cup
