= Radosław Murawski =

Polish footballer (born 1994)

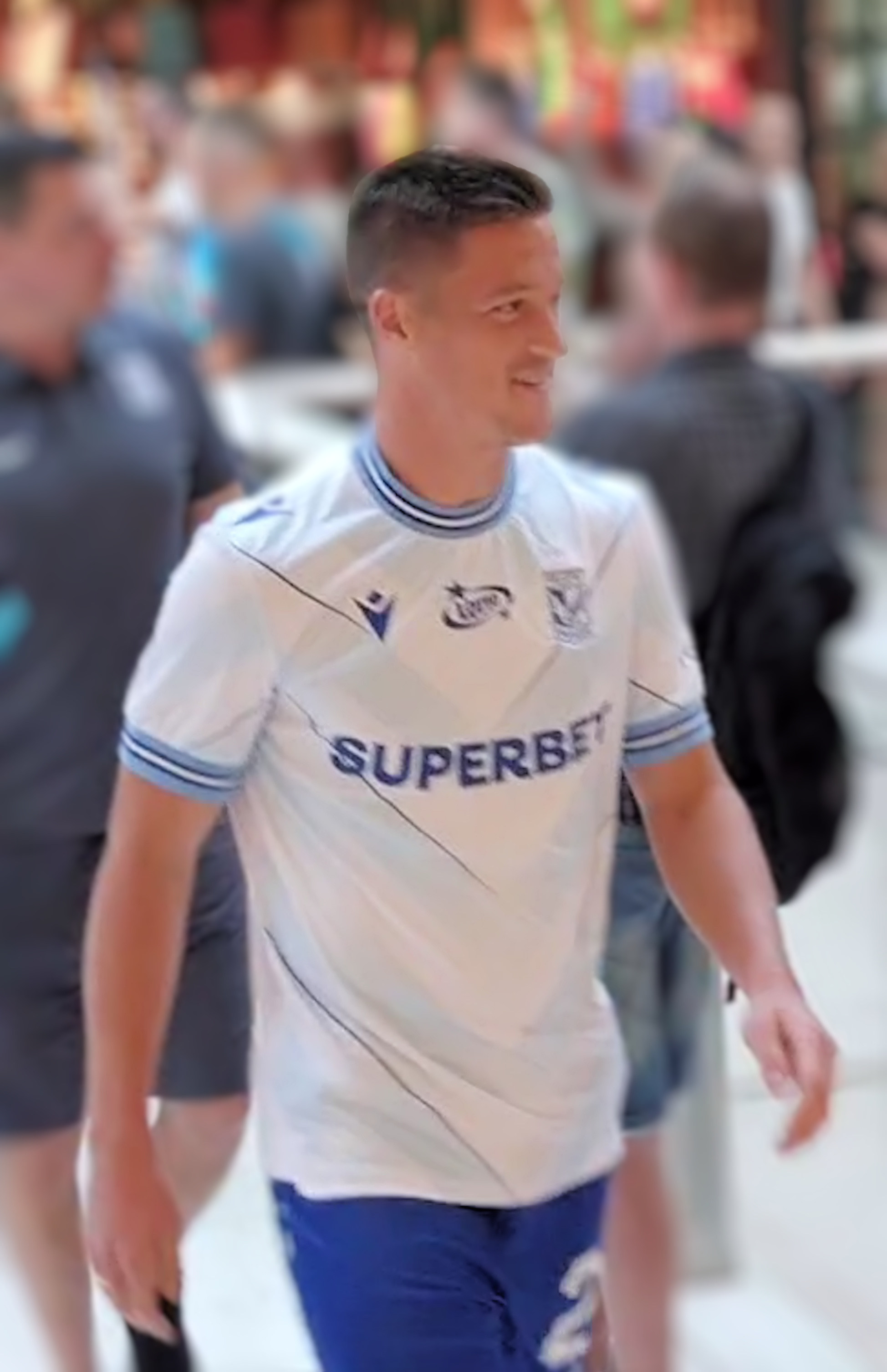
- Murawski with Lech Poznań in 2023

Personal information
- Full name: Radosław Paweł Murawski
- Date of birth: 22 April 1994 (age 32)
- Place of birth: Gliwice, Poland
- Height: 1.73 m (5 ft 8 in)
- Position: Midfielder

Team information
- Current team: Lech Poznań
- Number: 22

Youth career
- –2011: Piast Gliwice

Senior career*
Years	Team	Apps	(Gls)
2012–2017	Piast Gliwice	127	(4)
2017–2019	Palermo	71	(2)
2019–2021	Denizlispor	64	(5)
2021–	Lech Poznań	123	(3)
2021–2023	Lech Poznań II	2	(0)

International career
2013	Poland U19	5	(0)
2013–2015	Poland U20	9	(1)
2015–2017	Poland U21	13	(0)
- * Club domestic league appearances and goals as of 11:04, 16 November 2026 (UTC)

Radosław Paweł Murawski (born 22 April 1994) is a Polish professional footballer who plays as a midfielder for Ekstraklasa club Lech Poznań.

== Career statistics ==
As of match played 8 November 2026

Appearances and goals by club, season and competition
Club	Season	League			National cup (Note: Includes Polish Cup, Coppa Italia, Turkish Cup)		Continental		Other		Total	
Club	Season	Division	Apps	Goals	Apps	Goals	Apps	Goals	Apps	Goals	Apps	Goals
Piast Gliwice	2011–12	I liga	2	0	0	0	—		—		2	0
Piast Gliwice	2012–13	Ekstraklasa	9	1	0	0	—		—		9	1
Piast Gliwice	2013–14	Ekstraklasa	18	0	0	0	1 (Note: Appearance(s) in UEFA Europa League)	0	—		19	0
Piast Gliwice	2014–15	Ekstraklasa	29	0	2	0	—		—		31	0
Piast Gliwice	2015–16	Ekstraklasa	35	1	0	0	—		—		35	1
Piast Gliwice	2016–17	Ekstraklasa	33	2	1	0	2	0	—		36	2
Piast Gliwice	2017–18	Ekstraklasa	1	0	0	0	—		—		1	0
Piast Gliwice	Total		127	4	3	0	3	0	—		133	4
Palermo	2017–18	Serie B	39	1	2	1	—		—		41	2
Palermo	2018–19	Serie B	32	1	2	0	—		—		34	1
Palermo	Total		71	2	4	1	—		—		75	3
Denizlispor	2019–20	Süper Lig	32	4	3	1	—		—		35	5
Denizlispor	2020–21	Süper Lig	32	1	1	0	—		—		33	1
Denizlispor	Total		64	5	4	1	—		—		68	6
Lech Poznań	2021–22	Ekstraklasa	21	1	5	1	—		—		26	2
Lech Poznań	2022–23	Ekstraklasa	31	1	0	0	16 (Note: Two appearances in UEFA Champions League, fourteen appearances in UEFA Europa Conference League)	0	1 (Note: Appearance in Polish Super Cup)	0	48	1
Lech Poznań	2023–24	Ekstraklasa	30	1	3	0	3 (Note: Appearances in UEFA Europa Conference League)	1	—		36	2
Lech Poznań	2024–25	Ekstraklasa	25	0	1	0	—		—		26	0
Lech Poznań	2025–26	Ekstraklasa	3	0	0	0	0	0	0	0	3	0
Lech Poznań	2026–27	Ekstraklasa	13	0	1	0	9 (Note: Two appearances in UEFA Champions League, seven appearances and one goal in UEFA Europa League)	1	1	0	24	1
Lech Poznań	Total		123	3	10	1	28	2	2	0	163	6
Lech Poznań II	2021–22	II liga	1	0	0	0	—		—		1	0
Lech Poznań II	2023–24	II liga	1	0	0	0	—		—		1	0
Lech Poznań II	Total		2	0	0	0	—		—		2	0
Career total			387	14	21	3	31	2	2	0	441	19

== Honours ==
Piast Gliwice

- I liga: 2011–12

Lech Poznań

- Ekstraklasa: 2021–22, 2024–25, 2025–26
- Polish Super Cup: 2026
