= Mateusz Lis =

Polish footballer (born 1997)

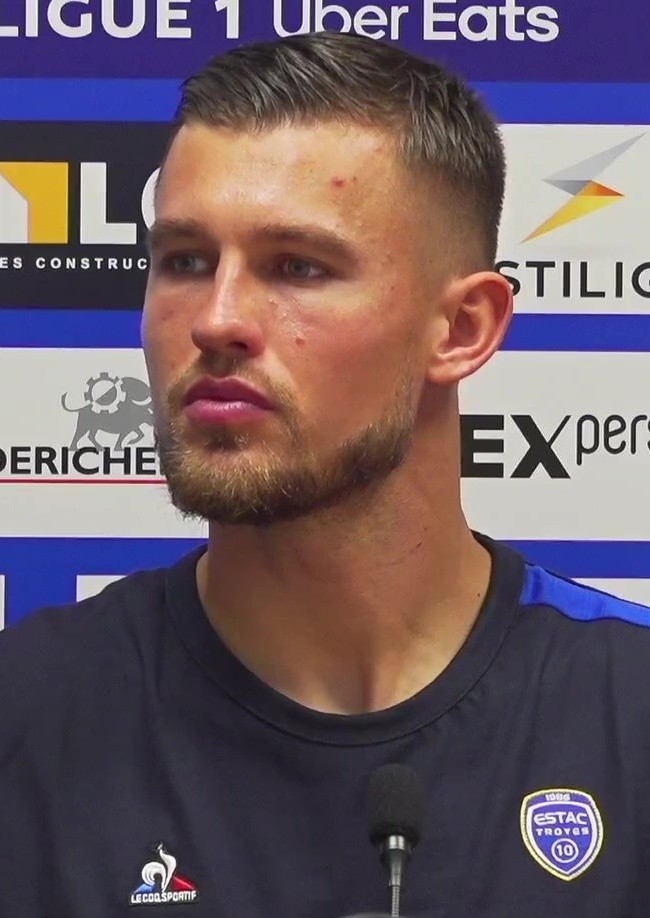
- Lis in 2022 with Troyes

Personal information
- Full name: Mateusz Lis
- Date of birth: 27 February 1997 (age 29)
- Place of birth: Żary, Poland
- Height: 1.92 m (6 ft 4 in)
- Position: Goalkeeper

Team information
- Current team: Lech Poznań
- Number: 1

Youth career
- –2008: Promień Żary
- 2008–2013: UKP Zielona Góra
- 2013–2014: Lech Poznań

Senior career*
Years	Team	Apps	(Gls)
2014–2018	Lech Poznań II	21	(0)
2015–2018	Lech Poznań	0	(0)
2015	→ Miedź Legnica (loan)	5	(0)
2015	→ Miedź Legnica II (loan)	1	(0)
2016	→ Podbeskidzie (loan)	3	(0)
2017–2018	→ Raków Częstochowa (loan)	26	(0)
2018–2021	Wisła Kraków	69	(0)
2021–2022	Altay	35	(0)
2022–2024	Southampton	0	(0)
2022–2023	→ Troyes (loan)	9	(0)
2023–2024	→ Göztepe (loan)	31	(0)
2024–2026	Göztepe	66	(0)
2026–	Lech Poznań	13	(0)

International career
2014–2015	Poland U18	5	(0)
2015	Poland U19	2	(0)
2017	Poland U20	1	(0)
- * Club domestic league appearances and goals as of 06:10, 13 November 2026 (UTC)

Mateusz Lis (born 27 February 1997) is a Polish professional footballer who plays as a goalkeeper for Ekstraklasa club Lech Poznań.

== Club career ==
Lis started his career with Lech Poznań. In July 2015, he joined Miedź Legnica on a season-long loan. In July 2016, Lis joined Podbeskidzie on loan for the season.

After returning from his loan moves, he struggled to get into the Lech Poznań side, and departed on loan again in January 2017, this time to Raków Częstochowa.

In July 2018, Lis joined Wisła Kraków on a three-year contract with the option to extend by one year. On 8 August 2018, he made his debut for the club in a 1–0 defeat to Jagiellonia Białystok, coming on as a substitute for Patryk Małecki in the 59th minute after Michał Buchalik was given a red card.

On 5 August 2021, Lis signed for Turkish side Altay. He made his debut for the club on 14 August 2021 in a 3–0 victory against Kayserispor. After Altay's relegation from the Süper Lig in the 2021–22 season, the club failed to make payments to Lis whilst offering him a new deal. He rejected the new contract and remained at the club for an extra two weeks unpaid before leaving in May 2022.

On 17 June 2022, Lis signed a five-year contract with Southampton pending a work permit, joining as a free agent.

On 1 September 2022, Lis joined Troyes on a season-long loan. Lis made his debut for the club on 16 October 2022 in a 1–1 draw with Ajaccio, and saved a penalty by Riad Nouri.

On 11 July 2023, he was sent on another year-long loan, this time joining Southampton's sister club, Turkish side Göztepe. During his loan spell, he helped Göztepe win promotion back to the Süper Lig.

On 22 August 2024, Lis joined Göztepe permanently on a three-year contract with the option of an additional year. In the 2025–26 season, he kept the most clean sheets in the league, recording 16 in 34 appearances.

On 16 June 2026, his former club Lech Poznań announced that Lis would be returning to Lech on a three-year contract. A month later, on 16 July, he made his first official appearance for Lech in a 3–1 win over Górnik Zabrze in the Polish Super Cup.

== Career statistics ==
As of match played 8 November 2026

Appearances and goals by club, season and competition
Club	Season	League			National cup (Note: Includes Polish Cup, Coupe de France, Turkish Cup)		Europe		Other		Total	
Club	Season	Division	Apps	Goals	Apps	Goals	Apps	Goals	Apps	Goals	Apps	Goals
Lech Poznań II	2014–15	III liga, gr. C	14	0	—		—		—		14	0
Lech Poznań II	2015–16	III liga, gr. C	7	0	—		—		—		7	0
Lech Poznań II	Total		21	0	—		—		—		21	0
Miedź Legnica (loan)	2015–16	I liga	5	0	1	0	—		—		6	0
Miedź Legnica II (loan)	2015–16	III liga, gr. E	1	0	—		—		—		1	0
Podbeskidzie (loan)	2016–17	I liga	3	0	1	0	—		—		4	0
Raków Częstochowa (loan)	2016–17	II liga	13	0	—		—		—		13	0
Raków Częstochowa (loan)	2017–18	I liga	18	0	1	0	—		—		19	0
Raków Częstochowa (loan)	Total		31	0	1	0	—		—		32	0
Wisła Kraków	2018–19	Ekstraklasa	35	0	0	0	—		—		35	0
Wisła Kraków	2019–20	Ekstraklasa	6	0	1	0	—		—		7	0
Wisła Kraków	2020–21	Ekstraklasa	27	0	0	0	—		—		27	0
Wisła Kraków	2021–22	Ekstraklasa	1	0	0	0	—		—		1	0
Wisła Kraków	Total		69	0	1	0	—		—		70	0
Altay	2021–22	Süper Lig	35	0	0	0	—		—		35	0
Southampton	2022–23	Premier League	0	0	0	0	—		—		0	0
Southampton	2023–24	Championship	0	0	0	0	—		—		0	0
Southampton	2024–25	Premier League	0	0	0	0	—		—		0	0
Southampton	Total		0	0	0	0	—		—		0	0
Troyes (loan)	2022–23	Ligue 1	9	0	1	0	—		—		10	0
Göztepe (loan)	2023–24	TFF First League	31	0	0	0	—		—		31	0
Göztepe	2024–25	Süper Lig	32	0	1	0	—		—		33	0
Göztepe	2025–26	Süper Lig	34	0	1	0	—		—		35	0
Göztepe	Total		66	0	2	0	—		—		68	0
Lech Poznań	2026–27	Ekstraklasa	13	0	0	0	10 (Note: Two appearances in UEFA Champions League, eight appearances in UEFA Europa League)	0	1 (Note: Appearance in Polish Super Cup)	0	24	0
Career total			284	0	7	0	10	0	1	0	301	0

== Honours ==
Raków Częstochowa

- II liga: 2016–17

Göztepe

- TFF First League runner-up: 2023–24

Lech Poznań

- Polish Super Cup: 2026
