= Luis Palma =

Honduran footballer (born 2000)

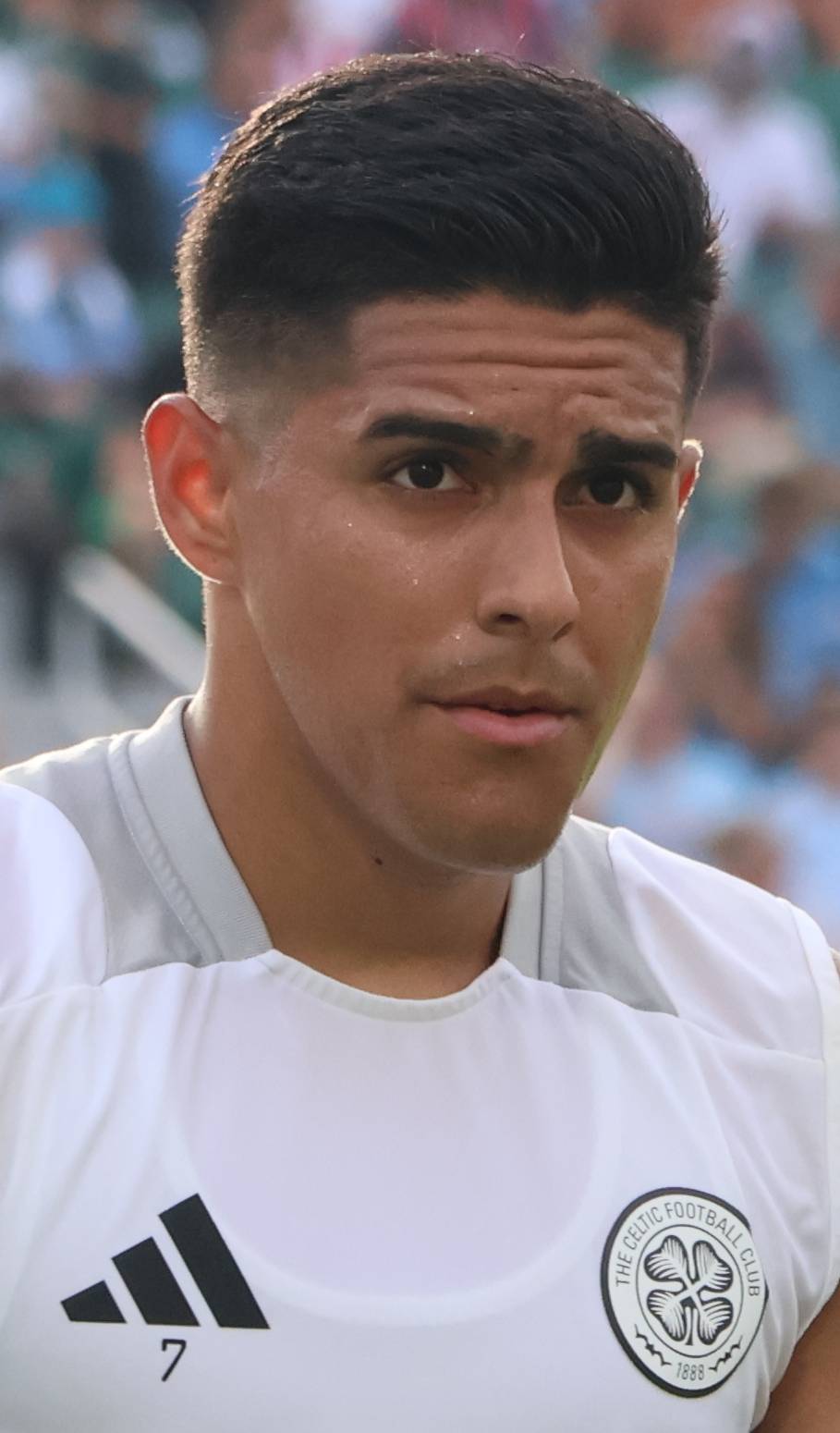
- Palma training with Celtic in 2024

Personal information
- Full name: Luis Enrique Palma Oseguera
- Date of birth: 17 January 2000 (age 26)
- Place of birth: La Ceiba, Honduras
- Height: 1.78 m (5 ft 10 in)
- Position: Winger

Team information
- Current team: Lech Poznań
- Number: 77

Youth career
- 2013–2017: Vida

Senior career*
Years	Team	Apps	(Gls)
2017–2022	Vida	70	(23)
2019	→ Real Monarchs (loan)	13	(1)
2022–2023	Aris	41	(13)
2023–2026	Celtic	36	(7)
2025	→ Olympiacos (loan)	8	(0)
2025–2026	→ Lech Poznań (loan)	31	(10)
2026–	Lech Poznań	12	(2)

International career^{‡}
2016–2017	Honduras U17	9	(2)
2018–2019	Honduras U20	7	(5)
2021	Honduras U23	8	(2)
2021–	Honduras	41	(8)
- * Club domestic league appearances and goals as of 15:01, 9 November 2026 (UTC) ‡ National team caps and goals as of 23:28, 17 November 2026 (UTC)

Luis Enrique Palma Oseguera (born 17 January 2000) is a Honduran professional footballer who plays as a winger for Ekstraklasa club Lech Poznań and the Honduras national team.

== Club career ==
=== Vida ===
Palma made his professional and Liga Nacional debut for Vida on 10 September 2017. He scored the third goal in an eventual 5–3 home victory against Honduras Progreso.

On 12 February 2019, Palma joined USL Championship side Real Monarchs on loan. He made his debut the following 9 March as a starter in a 1–1 draw against Sacramento Republic FC. On 27 July, Palma scored his first goal for Monarchs, the lone goal in a 3–1 away loss against San Antonio FC.

=== Aris ===
After being linked with Portuguese club Braga and Spanish club Levante, Palma signed with Greek club Aris on a four-and-a-half-year contract on 19 January 2022. He made his debut on the following 14 February in a 2–0 away loss to PAS Giannina in the league. He scored his first goal on 10 April in a 2–1 away victory against AEK Athens. He scored his second goal the following month, once again against AEK Athens, this time in a 3–2 home win.

On 21 July 2022, Palma made his European debut in the qualifying rounds of the UEFA Europa Conference League. He started in the first leg 5–1 home victory against Gomel in the second round. He scored one goal and assisted two more. Palma played a further 3 games in the Conference League until Aris was eliminated by Maccabi Tel Aviv.

On 8 November 2022, Palma scored his first career hat-trick in a 5–0 home win against Lamia.

In his second season at the club, Palma attracted interest from various teams, including Belgian and Scottish giants Anderlecht and Rangers, with the former having had a €3,000,000 bid rejected, while the demands of Aris were higher by one million. In April 2023, Honduran newspaper Diario Diez had reported that Palma was scouted by Manchester United at a Greek Super League match against Olympiacos, in which Palma scored once in a 2–1 win.

=== Celtic ===
On 30 August 2023, Palma signed with Scottish club Celtic on a five-year contract. He made his debut on 16 September against Dundee. He started against Feyenoord, making his UEFA Champions League debut in a 2–0 defeat. Palma scored against Atlético Madrid in a 2–2 draw at Celtic Park, becoming the second Honduran player to score in the Champions League.

==== Loan to Olympiacos ====
On 1 February 2025, Palma signed with Olympiacos on loan for the remainder of the season. He scored his only goal for Olympiacos on 26 February in a Greek Cup semifinal match against AEK Athens. The club ultimately chose not to exercise their Palma's buy option.

=== Lech Poznań ===
On 21 July 2025, Palma joined Polish club Lech Poznań on a season-long loan, with an option to make the move permanent. On 3 June 2026, Lech Poznań activated Palma's €4 million buyout clause to sign him permanently from Celtic on a three-year contract.

== International career ==
Palma has represented Honduras at under-17 and under-20 levels, appearing at the 2017 FIFA U-17 World Cup and the 2019 FIFA U-20 World Cup.

On 7 March 2021, Palma was selected for the squad of the Honduras U-23 team to participate in the Olympic Qualifying Championship. He scored the winning goal in Honduras' 2–1 semifinal win over the United States, after capitalizing on a mistake from David Ochoa, thus ensuring qualification to the 2020 Summer Olympics in Japan. Palma was later selected for the squad to participate in the football tournament at the Olympic Games. Palma came off the bench in Honduras' opener, a 1–0 defeat to Romania. In the next group stage game, he would score in an eventual 3–2 win over New Zealand. He would come off the bench in the final group stage game, a 6–0 loss to South Korea.

He made his debut for the senior national team on 7 October 2021 in a World Cup qualifier against Costa Rica, replacing Rigoberto Rivas in the second half. He scored his first senior goal on 12 September 2023. Palma converted from the penalty spot in a 4–0 win against Grenada in the CONCACAF Nations League group stages.

== Career statistics ==
=== Club ===
As of match played 8 November 2026

Appearances and goals by club, season and competition
Club	Season	League			National cup (Note: Includes Greek Cup, Scottish Cup, Polish Cup)		League cup (Note: Includes Scottish League Cup)		Continental		Other		Total	
Club	Season	Division	Apps	Goals	Apps	Goals	Apps	Goals	Apps	Goals	Apps	Goals	Apps	Goals
Vida	2017–18	Liga Nacional	14	2	—		—		—		—		14	2
Vida	2018–19	Liga Nacional	4	1	—		—		—		—		4	1
Vida	2019–20	Liga Nacional	9	1	—		—		—		—		9	1
Vida	2020–21	Liga Nacional	26	13	—		—		—		—		26	13
Vida	2021–22	Liga Nacional	17	6	—		—		—		—		17	6
Vida	Total		70	23	—		—		—		—		70	23
Real Monarchs (loan)	2019	USL Championship	13	1	—		—		—		—		13	1
Aris	2021–22	Super League Greece	11	2	0	0	—		—		—		11	2
Aris	2022–23	Super League Greece	29	11	3	1	—		4 (Note: Appearances in UEFA Europa Conference League)	1	—		36	13
Aris	2023–24	Super League Greece	1	0	—		—		4	2	—		5	2
Aris	Total		41	13	3	1	—		8	3	—		52	17
Celtic	2023–24	Scottish Premiership	28	7	3	1	—		5 (Note: Appearances in UEFA Champions League)	2	—		36	10
Celtic	2024–25	Scottish Premiership	8	0	0	0	2	0	2	0	—		12	0
Celtic	Total		36	7	3	1	2	0	7	2	—		48	10
Olympiacos (loan)	2024–25	Super League Greece	8	0	2	1	—		2 (Note: Appearances in UEFA Europa League)	0	—		12	1
Lech Poznań (loan)	2025–26	Ekstraklasa	31	10	1	0	—		15 (Note: Three appearances in UEFA Champions League, two appearances in UEFA Europa League, ten appearances and two goals in UEFA Conference League)	2	—		47	12
Lech Poznań	2026–27	Ekstraklasa	12	2	1	0	—		10 (Note: Two appearances in UEFA Champions League, eight appearances in UEFA Europa League)	0	1 (Note: Appearance in Polish Super Cup)	0	24	2
Lech Poznań	Lech Poznań total		43	12	2	0	—		25	2	1	0	71	14
Career total			211	56	10	3	2	0	42	7	1	0	266	66

=== International ===
As of match played 17 November 2026

Appearances and goals by national team and year
National team	Year	Apps	Goals
Honduras	2021	2	0
Honduras	2022	4	0
Honduras	2023	6	1
Honduras	2024	6	2
Honduras	2025	15	3
Honduras	2026	8	2
Total		41	8

Scores and results list Honduras' goal tally first, score column indicates score after each Palma goal.

List of international goals scored by Luis Palma
No.	Date	Venue	Opponent	Score	Result	Competition
1	12 September 2023	Estadio Nacional Chelato Uclés, Tegucigalpa, Honduras	Grenada	3–0	4–0	2023–24 CONCACAF Nations League A
2	15 November 2024	Estadio Francisco Morazán, San Pedro Sula, Honduras	Mexico	1–0	2–0	2024–25 CONCACAF Nations League A
3	15 November 2024	Estadio Francisco Morazán, San Pedro Sula, Honduras	Mexico	2–0	2–0	2024–25 CONCACAF Nations League A
4	21 March 2025	Bermuda National Stadium, Devonshire, Bermuda	Bermuda	2–2	5–3	2025 CONCACAF Gold Cup qualification
5	25 March 2025	Estadio Nacional Chelato Uclés, Tegucigalpa, Honduras	Bermuda	2–0	2–0	2025 CONCACAF Gold Cup qualification
6	24 June 2025	PayPal Park, San Jose, United States	Curaçao	2–1	2–1	2025 CONCACAF Gold Cup
7	31 March 2026	Butarque Stadium, Leganés, Spain	Peru	1–1	2–2	Friendly
8	5 October 2026	Estadio Nacional Chelato Uclés, Tegucigalpa, Honduras	Jamaica	1–1	1–1	2026–27 CONCACAF Nations League A

== Honours ==
Real Monarchs

- USL Championship: 2019

Celtic

- Scottish Premiership: 2023–24
- Scottish Cup: 2023–24
- Scottish League Cup: 2024–25

Olympiacos

- Super League Greece: 2024–25
- Greek Football Cup: 2024–25

Lech Poznań

- Ekstraklasa: 2025–26
- Polish Super Cup: 2026

Individual

- CONCACAF Men's Olympic Qualifying Championship Best XI: 2020
- Super League Greece Player of the Month: November 2022
