= Patrik Wålemark =

Swedish footballer (born 2001)

Personal information
- Full name: Jens Patrik Wålemark
- Date of birth: 14 October 2001 (age 25)
- Place of birth: Gothenburg, Sweden
- Height: 1.85 m (6 ft 1 in)
- Positions: Winger; attacking midfielder

Team information
- Current team: Lech Poznań
- Number: 10

Youth career
- Bankeryds SK

Senior career*
Years	Team	Apps	(Gls)
2018–2019	Qviding	47	(20)
2020–2021	Häcken	50	(12)
2022–2025	Feyenoord	27	(3)
2023–2024	→ Heerenveen (loan)	24	(3)
2024–2025	→ Lech Poznań (loan)	11	(4)
2025–	Lech Poznań	41	(13)

International career^{‡}
2021–2022	Sweden U21	11	(4)
2026–	Sweden	2	(0)
- * Club domestic league appearances and goals as of 08:44, 9 November 2026 (UTC) ‡ National team caps and goals as of 21:00, 28 September 2026 (UTC)

Jens Patrik Wålemark (born 14 October 2001) is a Swedish professional footballer who plays as a winger for Ekstraklasa club Lech Poznań and the Sweden national team.

== Club career ==
In July 2020, he started his first match in Allsvenskan, and in one hour he managed to score a goal, get two assists and be fouled to secure a penalty kick.

In January 2022, he transferred to Eredivisie club Feyenoord. He scored his first goal for the club on 10 April 2022, scoring Feyenoord's fourth goal in a 4–1 away victory over Heracles Almelo. On 31 August 2023, Wålemark went to Heerenveen on loan for the remainder of the season.

On 27 August 2024, Wålemark joined Polish Ekstraklasa club Lech Poznań on a season-long loan with an option to buy. He scored his first goals for Lech in a 3–2 away comeback win over Korona Kielce on 29 September 2024, recording his first career hat-trick. On 31 January 2025, Wålemark signed a four-and-a-half-year deal with Lech, after his buyout clause was exercised for a reported league record fee at the time of €1.8 million.

== International career ==
Wålemark was first called up to the Sweden national team in September 2022 for the 2022–23 UEFA Nations League games against Serbia and Slovenia, but remained on the bench in both. He waited four years for his second senior team selection, which came in September 2026 for a set of 2026–27 UEFA Nations League matches. Wålemark made his debut on 25 September, entering the pitch in 77th minute of a 2–1 win over Romania at the Nationalarenan in Solna.

== Career statistics ==
As of match played 9 November 2026

Appearances and goals by club, season and competition
Club	Season	League			National cup (Note: Includes Svenska Cupen, KNVB Cup, Polish Cup)		Continental		Other		Total	
Club	Season	Division	Apps	Goals	Apps	Goals	Apps	Goals	Apps	Goals	Apps	Goals
Qviding FIF	2018	Division 3	21	8	—		—		—		21	8
Qviding FIF	2019	Division 2	26	12	1	0	—		—		27	12
Qviding FIF	Total		47	20	1	0	—		—		48	20
Häcken	2020	Allsvenskan	21	3	1	0	—		—		22	3
Häcken	2021	Allsvenskan	29	9	1	0	2 (Note: Appearances in UEFA Conference League)	0	—		32	9
Häcken	Total		50	12	2	0	2	0	—		54	12
Feyenoord	2021–22	Eredivisie	12	1	—		3	0	—		15	1
Feyenoord	2022–23	Eredivisie	15	2	0	0	6 (Note: Appearances in UEFA Europa League)	0	0	0	21	2
Feyenoord	Total		27	3	0	0	9	0	0	0	36	3
Heerenveen (loan)	2023–24	Eredivisie	24	3	1	0	—		—		25	3
Lech Poznań	2024–25	Ekstraklasa	22	8	1	0	—		—		23	8
Lech Poznań	2025–26	Ekstraklasa	17	2	1	0	4	0	0	0	22	2
Lech Poznań	2026–27	Ekstraklasa	13	7	1	0	10 (Note: Two appearances and two goals in UEFA Champions League, eight appearances and four goals in UEFA Europa League)	6	1 (Note: Appearance in Polish Super Cup)	0	25	13
Lech Poznań	Total		52	17	3	0	14	6	1	0	70	23
Career total			200	55	7	0	25	6	1	0	233	61

=== International ===
As of match played 28 September 2026

Appearances and goals by national team and year
National team	Year	Apps	Goals
Sweden
Sweden	2026	2	0
Total		2	0

== Honours ==
Feyenoord

- Eredivisie: 2022–23
- UEFA Europa Conference League runner-up: 2021–22

Lech Poznań

- Ekstraklasa: 2024–25, 2025–26
- Polish Super Cup: 2026
