= 2024–25 Ruch Chorzów season =

Ruch Chorzów
2024–25 season
- Manager: Janusz Niedźwiedź
- Stadium: Ruch Chorzów Stadium
- I liga: 8th
- Polish Cup: Pre-season
- Average home league attendance: 13,037
- Biggest win: Odra Opole 0–2 Ruch Chorzów
Home colours	Away colours

The 2024–25 season is the 105th season in the history of Ruch Chorzów, and the club's first season back in the I liga following their relegation from Ekstraklasa. In addition to the domestic league, the team is scheduled to participate in the Polish Cup.

== Transfers ==
=== In ===
Pos.	Player	Transferred from	Fee	Date	Source
GK	(Slovakia) Martin Turk	(Italy) Parma	Undisclosed	16 July 2024	

=== Out ===
Pos.	Player	Transferred to	Fee	Date	Source
MF	(Poland) Tomasz Wójtowicz	(Poland) Lechia Gdańsk	Undisclosed	24 July 2024	

== Friendlies ==
=== Mid-season ===
24 January 2025 Friendly	Ruch Chorzów (Poland)	2–2	(Kosovo) Malisheva
14:00

== Competitions ==
=== Overall record ===
Competition	First match	Last match	Starting round	Record							
Competition	First match	Last match	Starting round	Pld	W	D	L	GF	GA	GD	Win %
I liga	19 July 2024	25–26 May 2025	Matchday 1	4	1	2	1	4	4	+0	25.00
Polish Cup				0	0	0	0	0	0	+0	—
Total				4	1	2	1	4	4	+0	25.00

Last updated: 12 August 2024
Source: Soccerway

=== I liga ===
==== League table ====
Pos	Team	Pld	W	D	L	GF	GA	GD	Pts
8	Znicz Pruszków	34	14	10	10	52	43	+9	52
9	Górnik Łęczna	34	13	11	10	50	42	+8	50
10	Ruch Chorzów	34	13	9	12	50	46	+4	48
11	ŁKS Łódź	34	13	8	13	50	41	+9	47
12	Stal Rzeszów	34	9	8	17	42	59	−17	35

Source: 1liga.org, 90minut.pl
Rules for classification: 1) Points; 2) Head-to-head points; 3) Head-to-head goal difference; 4) Goal difference; 6) Goals scored; 7) Number of wins; 8) Number of away wins.
(Note: Head-to-head record is used only after all the matches between the teams in question have been played)

Semi-finals; 29 May 2025
3	Wisła Płock	2
6	Polonia Warsaw	1
4	Wisła Kraków	0
5	Miedź Legnica	1

Final; 1 June 2025
3	Wisła Płock	2
5	Miedź Legnica	0

==== Results summary ====
Overall								Home						Away					
Pld	W	D	L	GF	GA	GD	Pts	W	D	L	GF	GA	GD	W	D	L	GF	GA	GD
31	13	7	11	46	40	+6	46	6	4	5	25	18	+7	7	3	6	21	22	−1

Last updated: 3 May 2025.
Source: soccerway

==== Results by round ====
Round	1	2	3	4	5	6	7	8	9	10	11	12	13	14	15	16	17	18	19	20	21	22	23	24	25	26	27	28	29	30	31	32	33	34
Ground	A	H	H	A	A	A	A	H	A	A	A	H	A	H	A	H	A	H	A	A	H	H	H	H	A	H	H	H	A	H	A	H	A	H
Result	W	D	D	L	D	D	L	W	W	L	L	W	W	W	W	W	L	W	W	D	L	D	L	D	L	L	L	L	W	W	W			
Position	2	4	8	9	9	11	12	10	8	10	12	10	10	9	5	5	5	4	4	4	5	5	6	7	7	9	10	10	9	9	9			

Updated to match(es) played on 3 May 2025. Source: worldfootball
A = Away; H = Home; W = Win; D = Draw; L = Loss

==== Matches ====
The match schedule was released on 12 June 2024.

19 July 2024 1	Odra Opole	0–2	Ruch Chorzów	Opole
20:30	Wolny (yellow card) 90+4'		Novothny 13', (yellow card) 90'; Góra (yellow card) 75'; Szczepan 88' (pen.)	Stadium: Odra Municipal Stadium; Referee: Karol Arys

28 July 2024 2	Ruch Chorzów	0–0	Znicz Pruszków	Chorzów
17:00				Stadium: Ruch Chorzów Stadium; Referee: Sebastian Krasny

2 August 2024 3	Ruch Chorzów	1–1	Pogoń Siedlce	Chorzów
20:00	Starzyński 56'		Pik 84'	Stadium: Ruch Chorzów Stadium; Referee: Piotr Idzik

12 August 2024 4	Wisła Kraków	3–1	Ruch Chorzów	Kraków
19:00 UTC+2	Biedrzycki (yellow card) 42'; Rodado 45+2', 75' (pen.); Mikulec (yellow card) 78'; Zwoliński (yellow card) 90+6'; Sukiennicki 90+10'		Ventúra (yellow card) 39'; Starzyński (red card) 50'; Szymanski 57'; Konczkowski (yellow card) 71'	Stadium: Henryk Reyman Stadium; Attendance: 22,217; Referee: Jarosław Przybył

18 August 2024 5	Nieciecza	1–1	Ruch Chorzów	Nieciecza
14:30 CEST	Faßbender 14'; Daniel Cieśla (yellow card) 63'; Ambrosiewicz (yellow card) 69'; Kasperkiewicz (red card) 78'; Putivtsev (yellow card) 90+3'	Report	Lukić (yellow card) 24'; Szczepan (yellow card) 49' (goal) 64'; Szwoch (yellow card) 90+5'	Stadium: Stadion Sportowy Bruk-Bet Termalica; Referee: (Poland) Marcin Szczerbowicz

22 August 2024 6	Arka Gdynia	1–1	Ruch Chorzów	Gdynia
19:00 CEST	Marcjanik 63'; Kacper Skóra (yellow card) 90'	Report	Lukić (yellow card) 6'; Szczepan 26'; Novothny (yellow card) 67' (yellow-red card) 78'	Stadium: Stadion Miejski; Attendance: 7,314; Referee: (Poland) Karol Arys

26 August 2024 7	Wisła Płock	3–2	Ruch Chorzów	Płock
19:00 CEST	Edmundsson 21' (yellow card) 48'; Fabian Hiszpański 70'; Krawczyk 90+3'; Kocyła (yellow card) 90+5'	Report	Lukić (yellow card) 24'; Szwoch 33' (yellow card) 37'; Szczepan (yellow card) 38' (goal) 76' (pen.); Szymon Szymański (yellow card) 63'; Ventúra (yellow card) 78'; Nono (yellow card) 90'	Stadium: Orlen Stadion; Attendance: 7,011; Referee: (Poland) Karol Arys

31 August 2024 8	Ruch Chorzów	3–2	Górnik Łęczna	Chorzów
19:30 CEST	Szwoch 21'; Sadlok (yellow card) 45'; Mezghrani (yellow card) 55'; Ventúra 65'; Szymon Karasiński (yellow card) 77'; Barański 86'	Report	Deja 43'; Warchoł 90+2'	Stadium: Silesian Stadium; Attendance: 10,858; Referee: (Poland) Piotr Rzucidło

16 September 2024 9	Tychy	0–1	Ruch Chorzów	Tychy
19:00 CEST	Hołownia (yellow card) 20'; Dijakovic (yellow card) 28'; Nemanja Nedić (yellow card) 65'; Ertlthaler (yellow card) 80'; Teo Kurtaran (yellow card) 83'	Report	Moneta 44'; Sadlok (yellow card) 89'; Szwoch (yellow card) 90'	Stadium: Stadion Miejski; Referee: (Poland) Paweł Malec

22 September 2024 10	Miedź Legnica	3–0	Ruch Chorzów	Legnica
12:30 CEST	Kaczmarski (yellow card) 20'; Mateusz Grudziński (yellow card) 33'; Kovačević 49'; Mioč 54'; Marcel Mansfeld 87'	Report	Sadlok (yellow card) 66' (yellow-red card) 66'; Lukić (yellow card) 79'	Stadium: White Eagle Municipal Stadium; Attendance: 4,339; Referee: (Poland) Damian Kos

29 September 2024 11	Stal Stalowa Wola	2–0	Ruch Chorzów	Stalowa Wola
19:30 CEST	Bartosz Pioterczak (yellow card) 7'; Łukasz Furtak 45+2'; Bartłomiej Kukułowicz (yellow card) 50'; Damian Urban 55'	Report	Myszor (yellow card) 13' (yellow-red card) 64'; Lukić (yellow card) 55'; Moneta (yellow card) 68'	Stadium: Subcarpathian Football Center; Referee: (Poland) Piotr Idzik

4 October 2024 12	Ruch Chorzów	1–0	Kotwica Kołobrzeg	Chorzów
20:30 CET	Mezghrani (yellow card) 34'; Szwoch (yellow card) 37'; Szczepan (yellow card) 47'; Wełna 75' (o.g.); Kozak (yellow card) 77'; Ventúra (yellow card) 83'	Report	Michał Kozajda (yellow card) 61'	Stadium: Silesian Stadium; Attendance: 10,407; Referee: (Poland) Jacek Małyszek

21 October 2024 13	Stal Rzeszów	0–2	Ruch Chorzów	Rzeszów
19:00 CET	Marcin Kaczor (yellow card) 23'; Paweł Oleksy (yellow card) 35'	Report	Novothny 4'; Ventúra (yellow card) 15'; Barański 25'; Szymon Szymański (yellow card) 32'; Lukić (yellow card) 45+1'; Nono (yellow card) 90+2'	Stadium: Stal Rzeszów Municipal Stadium; Attendance: 5,137; Referee: (Poland) Wojciech Myć

25 October 2024 14	Ruch Chorzów	2–1	Warta Poznań	Chorzów
20:30 CET	Novothny 5'; Szwoch (yellow card) 53'; Sadlock (yellow card) 62' (goal) 63'; Szczepan (yellow card) 88'	Report	Michalski 61'; Kacper Przybyłko (yellow card) 85'	Stadium: Silesian Stadium; Attendance: 10,744; Referee: (Poland) Patryk Gryckiewicz

3 November 2024 15	ŁKS Łódź	0–1	Ruch Chorzów	Łódź
14:30 CET	Kupczak (yellow card) 85'	Report	Barański 48'; Sadlok (yellow card) 72'	Stadium: Stadion Miejski ŁKS Łódź; Attendance: 10,512; Referee: (Poland) Grzegorz Kawałko

7 November 2024 16	Ruch Chorzów	5–0	Chrobry Głogów	Chorzów
19:00 CET	Kozak 2'; Novothny 14'; Mezghrani 19'; Ventúra 25'; Myszor 75'	Report	Bonecki (yellow card) 63'; Mucha (yellow card) 70'; Paweł Tupaj (yellow card) 74'; Robert Mandrysz (yellow card) 82'	Stadium: Silesian Stadium; Attendance: 10,111; Referee: (Poland) Tomasz Marciniak

=== Polish Cup ===
25 September 2024 First Round	Podhale Nowy Targ	0-2	Ruch Chorzów	Nowy Targ
15:00	Łukasz Seweryn (yellow card) 24'; Adrian Kozarzewski (yellow card) 87'	Report	Szwoch (yellow card) 14'; Kozak 30'; Sadlok (yellow card) 43'; Novothny 54'; Mezghrani (yellow card) 69'; Ventúra (yellow card) 75'; Lukić (yellow card) 88'	Stadium: Stadion Miejski im. Józefa Piłsudskiego; Attendance: 950; Referee: (Poland) Łukasz Szczech

29 October 2024 Round of 32	Avia Świdnik	1-3	Ruch Chorzów	Świdnik
12:00	Andrii Remeniuk (yellow card) 39'; Paweł Uliczny 56' (pen.)	Report	Szczepan 15' (yellow card) 46'; Góra (yellow card) 55'; Myszor 57'; Ventúra 77'	Stadium: Stadion Miejski; Referee: (Poland) Łukasz Szczech
