= 2023–24 Ruch Chorzów season =

Ruch Chorzów
2023–24 season
- Manager: Jan Woś
- Ekstraklasa: 17th
- Polish Cup
- Top goalscorer: League: Daniel Szczepan (7); All: Daniel Szczepan (7)
- Average home league attendance: 18,518

The 2023–24 season is Ruch Chorzów's 104th season in existence and first one back in the Polish top division Ekstraklasa. They are also competing in the Polish Cup.

== Players ==
=== First-team squad ===
As of 6 November 2023

Note: Flags indicate national team as defined under FIFA eligibility rules; some limited exceptions apply. Players may hold more than one non-FIFA nationality.

No.	Pos.	Nation	Player
1	GK	POL	Michał Buchalik
2	DF	POL	Konrad Kasolik
4	DF	POL	Przemysław Szur
5	MF	POL	Tomasz Wójtowicz
6	MF	POL	Tomasz Swędrowski
7	MF	POL	Juliusz Letniowski (on loan from Widzew Łódź)
8	MF	POL	Patryk Sikora
9	FW	POL	Maciej Firlej
10	MF	POL	Tomasz Foszmańczyk (captain)
13	MF	POL	Łukasz Moneta
16	MF	CZE	Jan Sedlák
17	MF	POL	Dawid Barnowski
18	FW	POL	Dominik Steczyk
19	FW	POL	Michał Feliks (on loan from Radomiak Radom)
20	MF	POL	Szymon Szymański
21	DF	POL	Maciej Sadlok

No.	Pos.	Nation	Player
22	MF	POL	Filip Starzyński
23	FW	POL	Artur Pląskowski
24	MF	POL	Bartłomiej Barański
25	DF	POL	Paweł Baranowski
26	MF	POL	Kacper Michalski
27	MF	POL	Wiktor Długosz (on loan from Raków Częstochowa)
28	MF	POR	Tomás Podstawski
31	GK	POL	Krzysztof Kamiński (on loan from Wisła Płock)
32	GK	POL	Marcel Potoczny
70	MF	POL	Miłosz Kozak
71	DF	POL	Remigiusz Szywacz
77	DF	POL	Mateusz Bartolewski
82	GK	POL	Jakub Bielecki
88	MF	POL	Kacper Skwierczyński
95	FW	POL	Daniel Szczepan

=== Out on loan ===
Note: Flags indicate national team as defined under FIFA eligibility rules; some limited exceptions apply. Players may hold more than one non-FIFA nationality.

No.	Pos.	Nation	Player
11	FW	POL	Igor Stasiński (at Szombierki Bytom until 30 June 2024)

== Transfers ==
=== In ===
Pos.	Player	Transferred from	Fee	Date	Source
FW	(Poland) Dominik Steczyk	(Germany) Hallescher FC	Free	1 July 2023	
MF	(Poland) Filip Starzyński	(Poland) Zagłębie Lubin	Free	1 July 2023	
MF	(Poland) Juliusz Letniowski	(Poland) Widzew Łódź	Loan	1 July 2023	
MF	(Poland) Wiktor Długosz	(Poland) Raków Częstochowa	Loan	1 July 2023	
MF	(Poland) Miłosz Kozak	(Poland) Górnik Łęczna	€78,000	30 August 2023	

=== Out ===
Pos.	Player	Transferred to	Fee	Date	Source
DF	(Poland) Filip Nawrocki	(Poland) Polonia Warsaw	Free	1 July 2023	
MF	(Poland) Jakub Piątek	(Poland) Skra Częstochowa	Free	1 July 2023	

== Pre-season and friendlies ==
Win Draw Loss Fixtures

8 July 2023 Friendly	Ruch Chorzów (Poland)	1–1	(Poland) Stal Rzeszów
12:00

14 July 2023 Friendly	Ruch Chorzów (Poland)	0–1	(Poland) Piast Gliwice
18:00

15 July 2023 Friendly	Odra Opole (Poland)	0–2	(Poland) Ruch Chorzów
14:00

8 September 2023 Friendly	Ruch Chorzów (Poland)	0–3	(Poland) Piast Gliwice
11:00

== Competitions ==
=== Overall record ===
Competition	First match	Last match	Starting round	Record							
Competition	First match	Last match	Starting round	Pld	W	D	L	GF	GA	GD	Win %
Ekstraklasa	23 July 2023	25 May 2024	Matchday 1	17	1	8	8	19	31	−12	5.88
Polish Cup	27 September 2023			1	0	0	1	2	3	−1	0.00
Total				18	1	8	9	21	34	−13	5.56

Last updated: 3 December 2023
Source: Soccerway

=== Ekstraklasa ===
==== League table ====
Pos	Team	Pld	W	D	L	GF	GA	GD	Pts	Qualification or relegation
14	Korona Kielce	34	8	14	12	40	44	−4	38 (Note: Korona Kielce finished ahead of Radomiak Radom on head-to-head points: Radomiak Radom 1–1 Korona Kielce, Korona Kielce 4–0 Radomiak Radom)	
15	Radomiak Radom	34	10	8	16	41	58	−17	38	
16	Warta Poznań	34	9	10	15	33	43	−10	37	Relegation to I liga
17	Ruch Chorzów	34	6	14	14	40	55	−15	32	Relegation to I liga
18	ŁKS Łódź	34	6	6	22	34	75	−41	24	Relegation to I liga

Source: ekstraklasa.org 90minut.pl
Rules for classification: 1) Points; 2) Head-to-head points; 3) Head-to-head goal difference; 4) Goal difference; 5) Goals scored; 6) Number of wins; 7) Number of away wins; 8) Lower number of points based on yellow and red cards (red card = 3 points, yellow card = 1 point, sending-off = 3 points - including 1 point for first yellow card); 9) Fairplay ranking; 10) Draw.
(Note: Head-to-head record is used only after all the matches between the teams in question have been played)

==== Results summary ====
Overall								Home						Away					
Pld	W	D	L	GF	GA	GD	Pts	W	D	L	GF	GA	GD	W	D	L	GF	GA	GD
17	1	8	8	19	31	−12	11	1	4	3	9	13	−4	0	4	5	10	18	−8

Last updated: 3 December 2023.
Source: Ekstraklasa

==== Results by round ====
Round	1	2	3	4	5	6	7	8	9	10	11	12	13	14	15	16	17	18
Ground	A	H	A	A	H	A	H	A	H	A	H	A	H	A	H	H	A	H
Result	L	W	L	D	L	D	D	L	L	D	L	L	D	L	D	D	D	
Position																		

Updated to match(es) played on 3 December 2023. Source: Ekstraklasa
A = Away; H = Home; W = Win; D = Draw; L = Loss

==== Matches ====
23 July 2023 1	Zagłębie Lubin	2–1	Ruch Chorzów	Lubin
17:30 CEST (UTC+2)				Stadium: Stadion Miejski

28 July 2023 2	Ruch Chorzów	2–0	ŁKS Łódź	Chorzów
20:30 CEST (UTC+2)				Stadium: Stadion Ruchu

6 August 2023 3	Legia Warsaw	3–0	Ruch Chorzów	Warsaw
20:00 CEST (UTC+2)				Stadium: Stadion Wojska Polskiego

14 August 2023 4	Warta Poznań	2–2	Ruch Chorzów	Poznań
19:00 CEST (UTC+2)				Stadium: Stadion Warty Poznań

19 August 2023 5	Ruch Chorzów	0–1	Jagiellonia Białystok	Chorzów
20:00 CEST (UTC+2)				Stadium: Stadion Ruchu

24 September 2023 9	Ruch Chorzów	3–5	Raków Częstochowa	Chorzów
15:00 CEST (UTC+2)				Stadium: Stadion Ruchu

7 October 2023 11	Ruch Chorzów	0–3	Pogoń Szczecin	Chorzów
20:00 CEST (UTC+2)				Stadium: Stadion Ruchu

28 October 2023 13	Ruch Chorzów	2–2	Śląsk Wrocław	Chorzów
20:00 CEST (UTC+2)				Stadium: Stadion Ruchu

4 November 2023	Lech Poznań	2–0	Ruch Chorzów	Poznań
20:00 CET (UTC+1)				Stadium: Stadion Poznań

13 November 2023 15	Ruch Chorzów	0–0	Radomiak Radom	Chorzów
19:00 CET (UTC+1)				Stadium: Stadion Ruchu

18 November 2023 12	Widzew Łódź	2–1	Ruch Chorzów	Łódź
17:30 CET (UTC+1)	Nunes 47'; Sánchez 87'		Bartolewski 16'	Stadium: Stadion Miejski Widzewa; Referee: Tomasz Kwiatkowski

26 November 2023 16	Ruch Chorzów	1–1	Korona Kielce	Chorzów
15:00 CET (UTC+1)				Stadium: Stadion Ruchu

3 December 2023 17	Cracovia	4–4	Ruch Chorzów	Kraków
12:30 CET (UTC+1)				Stadium: Stadion Cracovii im. Józefa Piłsudskiego

8 December 2023 18	Ruch Chorzów	v	Zagłębie Lubin	Chorzów
18:00 CET (UTC+1)				Stadium: Stadion Ruchu

17 December 2023 19	ŁKS Łódź	v	Ruch Chorzów	Łódź
12:30 CET (UTC+1)				Stadium: Stadion Miejski im. Władysława Króla

10 February 2024 20	Ruch Chorzów	v	Legia Warsaw	Chorzów
--:-- CET (UTC+1)				Stadium: Stadion Ruchu

17 February 2024 21	Ruch Chorzów	v	Warta Poznań	Chorzów
--:-- CET (UTC+1)				Stadium: Stadion Ruchu

=== Polish Cup ===
27 September 2023 First round	Legia Warszawa II	3–2	Ruch Chorzów	Warsaw
15:00 CEST (UTC+2)				Stadium: Legia Training Center
