= Patryk Sikora =

Polish footballer (born 1999)

Personal information
- Date of birth: 20 November 1999 (age 26)
- Place of birth: Mikołów, Poland
- Height: 1.87 m (6 ft 2 in)
- Position: Defensive midfielder

Team information
- Current team: Ruch Chorzów
- Number: 8

Youth career
- 2006–2009: Chrzciciel Tychy
- 2009–2017: Ruch Chorzów

Senior career*
Years	Team	Apps	(Gls)
2016–2023	Ruch Chorzów II	3	(2)
2017–	Ruch Chorzów	104	(8)
- * Club domestic league appearances and goals as of 14:39, 29 May 2026 (UTC)

Patryk Sikora (born 20 November 1999) is a Polish professional footballer who plays as a defensive midfielder for I liga club Ruch Chorzów, where he went through the youth teams and spent his whole senior career so far.

== Career ==
Sikora is a youth product of Ruch Chorzów. He made his first-team debut on 5 May 2018, in a 0–2 loss to Puszcza Niepołomice

He appeared in six matches in the Polish second-tier in the 2017–18 season, failing to score or provide an assist. His team finished last in the table and was relegated to the third tier.

He played in nine matches in the following season, again without scoring or assisting, as Ruch finished last and was demoted to the fourth division.

In the 2019–20 season, he appeared in seven matches, scoring one goal and providing one assist. The season was interrupted due to the COVID-19 pandemic. The following season, he played in 17 matches in the III liga, scoring three goals. His team finished first and returned to the division above. In February 2021, he tore his anterior cruciate ligament, sidelining him for an extended period.

After recovering from injury, he played in 17 matches in the 2021–22 II liga season without scoring or assisting, and his team finished third and, after defeating Radunia Stężyca in the semi-final and Motor Lublin in the final of the promotion playoffs, was promoted to the I liga.

In the 2022–23 season, he played in 28 matches in the I liga, scoring three goals and providing two assists. Ruch finished second and was promoted to the Ekstraklasa after a six-year absence.

He made his Ekstraklasa debut on 23 July 2023, in a 1–2 loss to Zagłębie Lubin. In total, he played in 19 matches, scoring his first Ekstraklasa goal in a 3–0 win over Piast Gliwice. On 20 April 2024, during a home match against Widzew Łódź, he tore his anterior cruciate ligament again, ruling him out for the rest of the season. His team finished 17th and was relegated back to the I liga.

== Career statistics ==
As of match played 20 April 2024

Appearances and goals by club, season and competition
Club	Season	League			Polish Cup		Other		Total	
Club	Season	Division	Apps	Goals	Apps	Goals	Apps	Goals	Apps	Goals
Ruch Chorzów II	2016–17	IV liga Silesia I	2	1	—		—		2	1
Ruch Chorzów II	2023–24	Regional league	1	1	—		—		1	1
Ruch Chorzów II	Total		3	2	—		—		3	2
Ruch Chorzów	2017–18	I liga	6	0	—		—		6	0
Ruch Chorzów	2018–19	II liga	9	0	1	0	—		10	0
Ruch Chorzów	2019–20	III liga, gr. III	7	1	0	0	—		7	1
Ruch Chorzów	2020–21	III liga, gr. III	18	2	—		—		18	2
Ruch Chorzów	2021–22	II liga	15	0	—		2 (Note: Appearances in II liga promotion play-offs)	0	17	0
Ruch Chorzów	2022–23	I liga	28	3	0	0	—		28	3
Ruch Chorzów	2023–24	Ekstraklasa	19	1	0	0	—		19	1
Ruch Chorzów	2024–25	I liga	0	0	0	0	—		0	0
Ruch Chorzów	2025–26	I liga	0	0	0	0	—		0	0
Ruch Chorzów	Total		102	8	1	0	2	0	105	8
Career total			105	10	1	0	2	0	108	10

== Honours ==
Ruch Chorzów

- III liga, group III: 2020–21
- Polish Cup (Katowice regionals): 2020–21
