= Szymon Szymański (footballer) =

Polish footballer (born Polish)

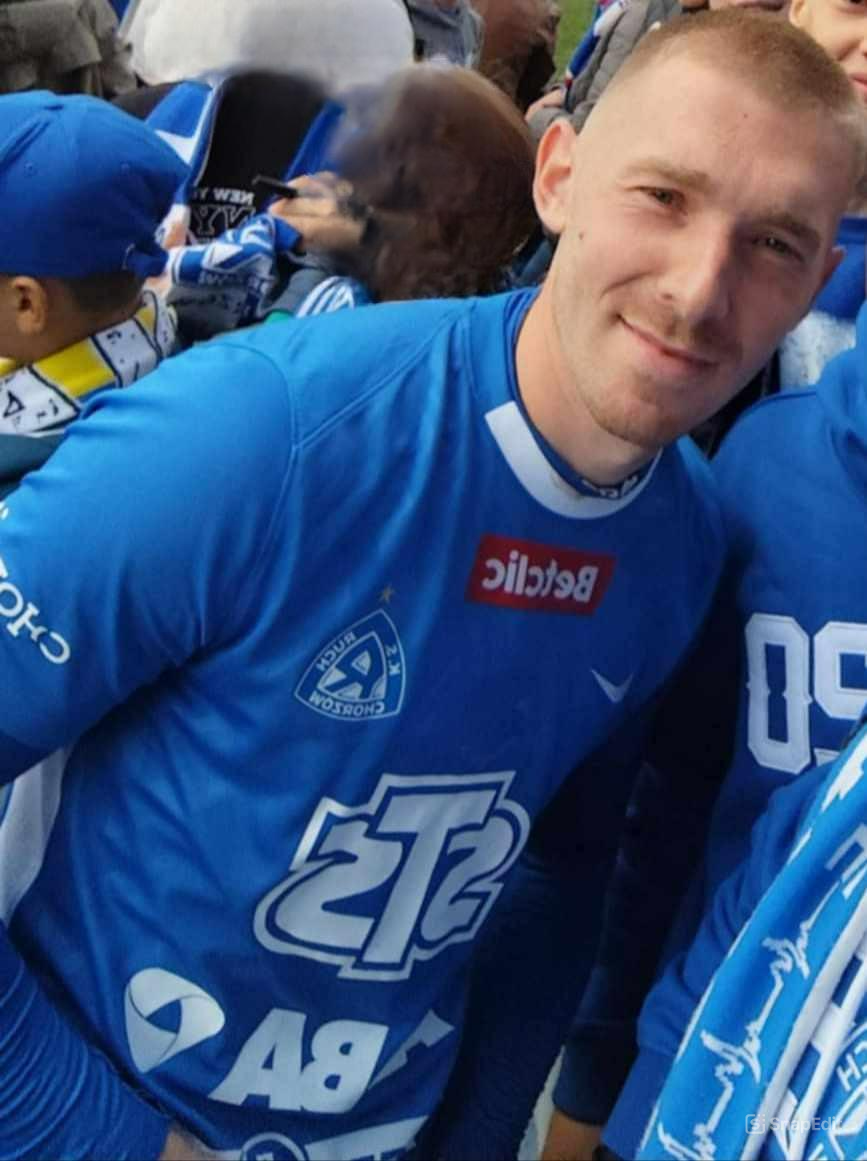
- Szymański in 2024

Personal information
- Date of birth: 13 April 1996 (age 30)
- Place of birth: Bielsko-Biała, Poland
- Height: 1.85 m (6 ft 1 in)
- Position: Defender

Team information
- Current team: Ruch Chorzów
- Number: 20

Youth career
- –2012: Rekord Bielsko-Biała

Senior career*
Years	Team	Apps	(Gls)
2012–2021	Rekord Bielsko-Biała	185	(45)
2016–2017	→ Podbeskidzie (loan)	4	(1)
2021–2023	Skra Częstochowa	55	(4)
2023–	Ruch Chorzów	95	(6)
- * Club domestic league appearances and goals as of 14:44, 29 May 2026 (UTC)

Szymon Szymański (born 13 April 1996) is a Polish professional footballer who plays as a defender for and captains I liga club Ruch Chorzów.

== Career statistics ==
As of match played 24 May 2026

Appearances and goals by club, season and competition
Club	Season	League			Polish Cup		Other		Total	
Club	Season	Division	Apps	Goals	Apps	Goals	Apps	Goals	Apps	Goals
Rekord Bielsko-Biała	2012–13	IV liga Silesia II	0	0	—		0	0	0	0
Rekord Bielsko-Biała	2013–14	III liga, gr. F	20	1	—		—		20	1
Rekord Bielsko-Biała	2014–15	III liga, gr. F	36	4	—		—		36	4
Rekord Bielsko-Biała	2015–16	III liga, gr. F	29	8	—		—		29	8
Rekord Bielsko-Biała	2016–17	III liga, gr. III	6	0	—		—		6	0
Rekord Bielsko-Biała	2017–18	III liga, gr. III	16	4	—		—		16	4
Rekord Bielsko-Biała	2018–19	III liga, gr. III	29	4	—		—		29	4
Rekord Bielsko-Biała	2019–20	III liga, gr. III	17	8	2	1	—		19	9
Rekord Bielsko-Biała	2020–21	III liga, gr. III	32	16	—		—		32	16
Rekord Bielsko-Biała	Total		185	45	2	1	—		187	46
Podbeskidzie Bielsko-Biała (loan)	2016–17	I liga	4	1	—		—		4	1
Podbeskidzie Bielsko-Biała (loan)	2017–18	I liga	0	0	0	0	—		0	0
Podbeskidzie Bielsko-Biała (loan)	Total		4	1	0	0	—		4	1
Skra Częstochowa	2021–22	I liga	27	2	1	0	—		28	2
Skra Częstochowa	2022–23	I liga	28	2	0	0	—		28	2
Skra Częstochowa	Total		55	4	1	0	—		56	4
Ruch Chorzów	2023–24	Ekstraklasa	31	0	0	0	—		31	0
Ruch Chorzów	2024–25	I liga	31	1	5	0	—		36	1
Ruch Chorzów	2025–26	I liga	33	5	1	0	—		34	5
Ruch Chorzów	Total		95	6	6	0	—		101	6
Career total			339	56	9	1	0	0	348	57

== Honours ==
Rekord Bielsko-Biała

- Polish Cup (Silesia regionals): 2018–19, 2020–21
- Polish Cup (Bielsko-Biała regionals): 2015–16, 2018–19, 2020–21
