= Tomasz Wójtowicz (disambiguation) =

Tomasz Wójtowicz may refer to:

- Tomasz Wójtowicz (1953–2022), Polish volleyball player
- Tomasz Wójtowicz (footballer) (born 2003), Polish football player
