= Chorzów Stadium =

The Chorzów Stadium may refer to:

- Ruch Chorzów Stadium
- Silesian Stadium in Chorzów
