= Bartłomiej Barański =

Polish footballer (born 2006)

Personal information
- Full name: Bartłomiej Paweł Barański
- Date of birth: 9 October 2006 (age 20)
- Place of birth: Katowice, Poland
- Height: 1.78 m (5 ft 10 in)
- Position: Attacking midfielder

Team information
- Current team: Odra Opole (on loan from Lech Poznań)
- Number: 10

Youth career
- 2010–2020: GKS Katowice
- 2020–2022: Lech Poznań

Senior career*
Years	Team	Apps	(Gls)
2022–2025	Ruch Chorzów	23	(6)
2023	→ Odra Wodzisław (loan)	14	(5)
2025–	Lech Poznań	0	(0)
2025	→ Ruch Chorzów (loan)	11	(1)
2025	Lech Poznań II	11	(2)
2026	→ GKS Tychy (loan)	15	(0)
2026–	→ Odra Opole (loan)	11	(0)

International career^{‡}
2024–2025	Poland U19	4	(0)
2025–	Poland U20	8	(2)
- * Club domestic league appearances and goals as of 14:03, 10 November 2026 (UTC) ‡ National team caps and goals as of 21:30, 19 November 2026 (UTC)

Bartłomiej Paweł Barański (born 9 October 2006) is a Polish professional footballer who plays as an attacking midfielder for I liga club Odra Opole, on loan from Lech Poznań.

== Club career ==
=== Early career ===
Born in Katowice, Barański started his youth career with his hometown club GKS at the age of four. In the summer of 2020, Barański moved to the youth setup of Lech Poznań, joining their under-15 team.

=== Ruch Chorzów ===
On 19 June 2022, Barański returned to Silesia, joining I liga club Ruch Chorzów on a two-year deal with an option for a further year. He made his professional debut on 26 July 2022 in a 2–0 Polish Cup win over Znicz Pruszków. In doing so, at the age of 15 years and 290 days, he became the second youngest player to ever appear for Ruch in a competitive match.

On 22 February 2023, he was sent on loan to fourth tier side Odra Wodzisław Śląski for the remainder of the season.

Barański made his top-tier debut on 24 September 2023, coming on in the 90th minute of a 3–5 loss to Raków Częstochowa. On 13 May 2024, he scored his first league goal for Ruch in a 2–0 away victory over Radomiak Radom.

Following Ruch's relegation, Barański became a regular member of the first-team squad in the 2024–25 season. After scoring three goals in five league games at the end of 2024, he was named I liga's Player of the Month for November and December.

=== Lech Poznań ===
On 13 January 2025, with six months remaining on his contract, Barański was transferred to Ekstraklasa club Lech Poznań for an estimated initial fee of PLN 100,000 (€23,314), signing a four-and-a-half-year contract.

Following his transfer to Lech, he was immediately loaned back to Ruch for the rest of the season. He made one senior team appearance for Lech during the 2025–26 season before joining GKS Tychy on a six-month loan on 22 December 2025. On 24 June 2026, Barański was sent on another loan, joining second-tier side Odra Opole for the 2026–27 season.

== International career ==
Barański began his international career with the Poland under-19 team, making two appearances in friendly defeats to Portugal and Czech Republic in November 2024. On 9 September, he made his first appearance at the under-20 level, scoring Poland's sole goal in the 82nd minute of a 1–2 loss to Portugal.

== Career statistics ==
As of match played 6 November 2026

Appearances and goals by club, season and competition
Club	Season	League			Polish Cup		Europe		Other		Total	
Club	Season	Division	Apps	Goals	Apps	Goals	Apps	Goals	Apps	Goals	Apps	Goals
Ruch Chorzów	2022–23	I liga	2	0	1	0	—		—		3	0
Ruch Chorzów	2023–24	Ekstraklasa	7	1	1	0	—		—		8	1
Ruch Chorzów	2024–25	I liga	25	6	4	1	—		—		29	7
Ruch Chorzów	Total		34	7	6	1	—		—		40	8
Odra Wodzisław (loan)	2022–23	III liga, gr. III	14	5	—		—		—		14	5
Lech Poznań	2025–26	Ekstraklasa	0	0	0	0	1 (Note: Appearance in UEFA Europa League)	0	0	0	1	0
Lech Poznań II	2025–26	III liga, gr. III	11	2	—		—		—		11	2
GKS Tychy (loan)	2025–26	I liga	15	0	—		—		—		15	0
Odra Opole (loan)	2026–27	I liga	11	0	2	0	—		—		13	0
Career total			85	14	8	1	1	0	0	0	94	15

== Honours ==
Odra Wodzisław Śląski

- Polish Cup (Rybnik regionals): 2022–23

Individual

- I liga Player of the Month: November & December 2024
