= Jakub Myszor =

Polish footballer

Personal information
- Date of birth: 7 June 2002 (age 24)
- Place of birth: Tychy, Poland
- Height: 1.75 m (5 ft 9 in)
- Position: Winger

Team information
- Current team: Górnik Łęczna
- Number: 38

Youth career
- –2011: GTS Bojszowy
- 2011–2013: MOSM Tychy
- 2013–2019: Stadion Śląski Chorzów
- 2019–2021: Cracovia

Senior career*
Years	Team	Apps	(Gls)
2021–2023	Cracovia II	15	(7)
2021–2024	Cracovia	55	(5)
2024–2025	Raków Częstochowa	4	(0)
2024	Raków Częstochowa II	2	(1)
2024–2025	→ Ruch Chorzów (loan)	18	(2)
2025–2026	Teuta	13	(0)
2026–	Górnik Łęczna	14	(0)

International career
2021	Poland U20	1	(0)
2022–2023	Poland U21	6	(0)
- * Club domestic league appearances and goals as of 16:10, 26 May 2026 (UTC)

Jakub Myszor (born 7 June 2002) is a Polish professional footballer who plays as a winger for II liga club Górnik Łęczna.

== Career statistics ==
As of match played 24 May 2026

Appearances and goals by club, season and competition
Club	Season	League			National cup (Note: Includes Polish Cup)		Europe		Other		Total	
Club	Season	Division	Apps	Goals	Apps	Goals	Apps	Goals	Apps	Goals	Apps	Goals
Cracovia II	2020–21	III liga, gr. IV	2	0	—		—		—		2	0
Cracovia II	2021–22	III liga, gr. IV	10	7	—		—		—		10	7
Cracovia II	2022–23	III liga, gr. IV	3	0	—		—		—		3	0
Cracovia II	Total		15	7	—		—		—		15	7
Cracovia	2020–21	Ekstraklasa	1	0	0	0	—		—		1	0
Cracovia	2021–22	Ekstraklasa	26	3	1	0	—		—		27	3
Cracovia	2022–23	Ekstraklasa	20	2	2	0	—		—		22	2
Cracovia	2023–24	Ekstraklasa	8	0	1	0	—		—		9	0
Cracovia	Total		55	5	4	0	—		—		59	5
Raków Częstochowa	2023–24	Ekstraklasa	3	0	1	0	—		—		4	0
Raków Częstochowa	2024–25	Ekstraklasa	1	0	0	0	—		—		1	0
Raków Częstochowa	Total		4	0	1	0	—		—		5	0
Raków Częstochowa II	2023–24	III liga, gr. III	2	1	—		—		—		2	1
Ruch Chorzów (loan)	2024–25	I liga	18	2	4	1	—		—		22	3
Teuta	2025–26	Kategoria Superiore	13	0	0	0	—		—		13	0
Górnik Łęczna	2025–26	I liga	14	0	—		—		—		14	0
Career total			121	15	9	1	0	0	0	0	130	16
