= 2025–26 Lech Poznań season =

Lech Poznań
2025–26 season
- Co-chairmen: Karol Klimczak; Since 1 November 2011; Piotr Rutkowski; Since 27 January 2021
- Manager: Niels Frederiksen; Since 14 May 2024
- Stadium: Enea Stadion
- Ekstraklasa: 1st
- Polish Cup: Quarter-finals
- Polish Super Cup: Runners-up
- UEFA Champions League: Third qualifying round
- UEFA Europa League: Play-off round
- UEFA Conference League: Round of 16
- Top goalscorer: League: Mikael Ishak (16 goal); All: Mikael Ishak (31 goal)
- Highest home attendance: Ekstraklasa: 41,598 vs. Arka (8 May 2026)
- Lowest home attendance: Polish Cup: 13,577 vs. Górnik (4 March 2026)
- Average home league attendance: 31,066
- Biggest win: UEFA Champions League: Lech 7–1 Breiðablik (22 July 2025)
- Biggest defeat: UEFA Europa League: Lech 1–5 Genk (21 August 2025)
Home colours	Away colours	Third colours

The 2025–26 season is Lech Poznań's 104th season in existence and the club's 24th consecutive season in the top flight of Polish football. In addition to the domestic league, Lech Poznań participates in this season's edition of the Polish Cup, the Polish Super Cup and the UEFA Champions League. The season covers the period from 1 July 2025 to 30 June 2026.

Lech is defending the championship title they won last season.

Lech Poznań plays their official home matches at the Stadion Miejski branded on 24 July 2023 as Enea Stadion for sponsorship reasons for four next seasons.

The team started their preparations for the 2025–26 season on 19 June 2025. Between 23 June and 5 July they will hold a summer training camp at the Research and Development Center - the campus of their football academy located in Wronki. As part of the preparations, Lech has originally scheduled 3 friendly games, but due to Polish Super Cup game scheduled on 13 July 2025 the last game against Teplice has been cancelled.

Lech kicked off the 2025–26 season on 13 July 2025 with a clash for the Polish Super Cup against their longtime rival - Legia Warsaw - who won last season’s Polish Cup. Then, on 19 July 2025, they started the new Ekstraklasa season with a home game against Cracovia. On 23 July 2025, they played the first leg of the UEFA Champions League second qualifying round.

Lech started the season in bad style, losing their first two home matches - the Polish Super Cup and the first round of the Ekstraklasa. Despite the initial difficulties, the team went on to win the next four matches in a row, climbing up the Ekstraklasa table and advancing to the third qualifying round of the UEFA Champions League.

== Club ==
=== Coaching staff ===
Position	Staff
Manager	(Denmark) Niels Frederiksen
Assistant manager	(Norway) Sindre Tjelmeland
Assistant coaches	(Denmark) Markus Uglebjerg (until 18 December 2025) (England) Andy Parslow (since 6 January 2026) (Poland) Hubert Wędzonka
Goalkeeping coach	(Poland) Dominik Kubiak
Fitness coaches	(Czech Republic) Antonin Čepek (Poland) Karol Kikut (Poland) Michał Włodarczyk (Poland) Józef Napierała
Match analyst	(Poland) Hubert Barański
Head of medical department	(Poland) Rafał Hejna
Team doctors	(Poland) Tomasz Jaśkowiak (Poland) Patrick Buliński (Poland) Aleksander Zych
Physiotherapists	(Poland) Maciej Łopatka (Poland) Marcin Lis (Poland) Maciej Smuniewski (Poland) Bartosz Górecki
Dietician	(Poland) Patryk Wiśniewski
Team manager	(Poland) Mariusz Skrzypczak
Kit manager	(Poland) Sławomir Mizgalski
Cook	(Poland) Artur Dzierzbicki

Source: Lech Poznań

=== Management ===
Position	Staff
Chairman	(Poland) Karol Klimczak (Poland) Piotr Rutkowski
Sporting director	(Poland) Tomasz Rząsa

Source: Lech Poznań

== Current squad ==
As of 16 March 2026

Note: Flags indicate national team as defined under FIFA eligibility rules; some limited exceptions apply. Players may hold more than one non-FIFA nationality.

No.	Pos.	Nation	Player
1	GK	BUL	Plamen Andreev (on loan from (Netherlands) Feyenoord)
2	DF	POR	Joel Pereira
3	DF	SWE	Alex Douglas
4	DF	POR	João Moutinho
6	MF	KEN	Timothy Ouma (on loan from (Czech Republic) Slavia Prague)
7	FW	CIV	Yannick Agnero
8	MF	IRI	Ali Gholizadeh
9	FW	SWE	Mikael Ishak (captain)
10	MF	SWE	Patrik Wålemark
11	MF	FIN	Daniel Håkans
14	MF	SWE	Leo Bengtsson
15	DF	POL	Michał Gurgul
16	DF	CRO	Antonio Milić
20	DF	POL	Robert Gumny
22	MF	POL	Radosław Murawski (Vice-captain)

No.	Pos.	Nation	Player
23	MF	ISL	Gísli Þórðarson
24	MF	POL	Filip Jagiełło
27	DF	POL	Wojciech Mońka
33	GK	POL	Mateusz Pruchniewski
41	GK	POL	Bartosz Mrozek
43	MF	POL	Antoni Kozubal
44	MF	POL	Tymoteusz Gmur
53	MF	POL	Sammy Dudek
54	FW	POL	Kamil Jakóbczyk
56	MF	POL	Kornel Lisman
72	DF	POL	Mateusz Skrzypczak
77	MF	HON	Luis Palma (on loan from (Scotland) Celtic)
88	MF	NGR	Taofeek Ismaheel (on loan from Górnik Zabrze)
90	DF	POL	Hubert Janyszka
99	MF	ESP	Pablo Rodríguez

=== Out on loan ===
Note: Flags indicate national team as defined under FIFA eligibility rules; some limited exceptions apply. Players may hold more than one non-FIFA nationality.

No.	Pos.	Nation	Player
17	FW	POL	Filip Szymczak (at (Belgium) Charleroi until 30 June 2026)
19	FW	NOR	Bryan Fiabema (at (Netherlands) ADO Den Haag until 30 June 2026)
21	MF	POL	Bartłomiej Barański (at GKS Tychy until 30 June 2026)
31	GK	POL	Krzysztof Bąkowski (at (Norway) KFUM Oslo until 31 December 2026)

No.	Pos.	Nation	Player
—	GK	POL	Mateusz Mędrala (at Sokół Kleczew until 30 June 2026)
—	DF	USA	Ian Hoffmann (at (Norway) HamKam until 30 June 2026)
—	MF	POL	Maksymilian Dziuba (at Śląsk Wrocław until 30 June 2026)

== Transfer ==
=== Summer transfer window ===
==== In ====
No.	Pos.	Nat.	Name	Age	EU	Moving from	Type	Transfer window	Ends	Transfer fee	Source
7	FW	(Ivory Coast)	Yannick Agnero	22	Non-EU	(Sweden) Halmstad	Transfer	Summer	2030	€2,300,000	
5	DF	(Sweden)	Elias Andersson	29	EU	(Denmark) Viborg	Loan return	Summer	2026	Free	
	MF	(Poland)	Jakub Antczak	21	EU	Chrobry Głogów	Loan return	Summer	2027	Free	
21	MF	(Poland)	Bartłomiej Barański	18	EU	Ruch Chorzów	Loan return	Summer	2029	Free	
31	GK	(Poland)	Krzysztof Bąkowski	22	EU	Stal Rzeszów	Loan return	Summer	2026	Free	
14	MF	(Sweden)	Leo Bengtsson	27	EU	(Cyprus) Aris Limassol	Transfer	Summer	2028	€800,000	
	DF	(Poland)	Filip Borowski	21	EU	Ruch Chorzów	Loan return	Summer	2026	Free	
20	DF	(Poland)	Robert Gumny	27	EU	(Germany) FC Augsburg	Transfer	Summer	2027	Free	
88	MF	(Nigeria)	Taofeek Ismaheel	25	Non-EU	Górnik Zabrze	Loan	Summer	2026	Free	
54	FW	(Poland)	Kamil Jakóbczyk	17	EU		Transfer	Summer	2028	Youth system	
4	DF	(Portugal)	João Moutinho	27	EU	(Italy) Spezia	Transfer	Summer	2027	€500,000	
6	MF	(Kenya)	Timothy Ouma	21	Non-EU	(Czech Republic) Slavia Prague	Loan	Summer	2026	Free	
77	MF	(Honduras)	Luis Palma	25	Non-EU	(Scotland) Celtic	Loan	Summer	2026	Free	
33	GK	(Poland)	Mateusz Pruchniewski	18	EU	Pogoń Siedlce	Loan return	Summer	2026	Free	
99	MF	(Spain)	Pablo Rodríguez	23	EU	(Italy) Lecce	Transfer	Summer	2029	€1,200,000	
72	DF	(Poland)	Mateusz Skrzypczak	24	EU	Jagiellonia Białystok	Transfer	Summer	2029	€900,000	
17	FW	(Poland)	Filip Szymczak	23	EU	GKS Katowice	Loan return	Summer	2027	Free	
	DF	(Poland)	Bartosz Tomaszewski	20	EU	Polonia Bytom	Loan return	Summer	2026	Free	

Total spending: ▼€5,700,000

==== Out ====
No.	Pos.	Nat.	Name	Age	EU	Moving to	Type	Transfer window	Transfer fee	Source
5	DF	(Sweden)	Elias Andersson	29	EU	(Denmark) Randers	Transfer	Summer	Free	
35	GK	(Poland)	Filip Bednarek	32	EU	(Netherlands) Sparta Rotterdam	End of contract	Summer	Free	
	DF	(Poland)	Filip Borowski	21	EU	Piast Gliwice	Transfer	Summer	Free	
29	DF	(Denmark)	Rasmus Carstensen	24	EU	(Germany) 1. FC Köln	End of loan	Summer	Free	
25	DF	(Sweden)	Filip Dagerstål	28	EU		End of contract	Summer	Free	
	MF	(Poland)	Maksymilian Dziuba	19	EU	Śląsk Wrocław	Loan	Summer	Free	
77	FW	(Spain)	Mario González	29	EU	(United States) Los Angeles FC	End of loan	Summer	Free	
21	MF	(Bosnia and Herzegovina) (Slovenia)	Dino Hotić	29	EU	(United Arab Emirates) Ajman Club	Transfer	Summer	Free	
	GK	(Poland)	Mateusz Mędrala	19	EU	Sokół Kleczew	Loan	Summer	Free	
55	DF	(Poland)	Maksymilian Pingot	22	EU	Górnik Zabrze	Transfer	Summer	€200,000	
18	DF	(Poland)	Bartosz Salamon	34	EU	(Italy) Carrarese	Transfer	Summer	Free	
7	MF	(Portugal)	Afonso Sousa	25	EU	(Turkey) Samsunspor	Transfer	Summer	€3,000,000	
17	FW	(Poland)	Filip Szymczak	23	EU	(Belgium) Charleroi	Loan	Summer	Free	

Total income: ▲€3,200,000

Total expenditure: ▼€2,500,000

=== Winter transfer window ===
==== In ====
No.	Pos.	Nat.	Name	Age	EU	Moving from	Type	Transfer window	Ends	Transfer fee	Source
1	GK	(Bulgaria)	Plamen Andreev	21	EU	(Netherlands) Feyenoord	Loan	Winter	2026	Free	
	DF	(United States)	Ian Hoffmann	24	EU	(Norway) Kristiansund	Loan return	Winter	2027	Free	
90	DF	(Poland)	Hubert Janyszka	16	EU		Transfer	Winter	2028	Youth system	

Total spending: €0

==== Out ====
No.	Pos.	Nat.	Name	Age	EU	Moving to	Type	Transfer window	Transfer fee	Source
21	MF	(Poland)	Bartłomiej Barański	19	EU	GKS Tychy	Loan	Winter	Free	
31	GK	(Poland)	Krzysztof Bąkowski	23	EU	(Norway) KFUM Oslo	Loan	Winter	Free	
19	FW	(Norway)	Bryan Fiabema	22	EU	(Netherlands) ADO Den Haag	Loan	Winter	Free	
	DF	(United States)	Ian Hoffmann	24	EU	(Norway) HamKam	Loan	Winter	Free	

Total income: €0

Total expenditure: €0

== Friendlies ==
Win Draw Loss

28 June 2025 Club friendly	Lech Poznań	2–1	Chrobry Głogów	Wronki
12:00 CEST (UTC+02:00)	Jakóbczyk 83'; Gmur 90+1'	90minut Official website Opponent official website KKSLECH.com	Malczuk 90'	Stadium: Lech Poznań Academy Stadium; Attendance: 999

5 July 2025 Club friendly	Lech Poznań	1–2	(Czech Republic) Baník Ostrava	Wronki
11:00 CEST (UTC+02:00)	Ishak 26'	90minut Official website Opponent official website KKSLECH.com	Ewerton 10'; Prekop 45'	Stadium: Lech Poznań Academy Stadium; Attendance: 999; Referee: Bartłomiej Zywert (Konin)

12 July 2025 Club friendly	Lech Poznań	v	(Czech Republic) Teplice	Poznań
				Stadium: Lech Poznań training ground
Note: The match was canceled due to the 2025 Polish Super Cup game taking place the next day.

14 July 2025 Club friendly	Lech Poznań	2–2	Sokół Kleczew	Poznań
12:00 CEST (UTC+02:00)	Szymczak 18' (pen.), 56'	90minut Official website Opponent official website KKSLECH.com	Sopoćko 32'; Stachowicz 40'	Stadium: Lech Poznań training ground Attendance: 0
Note: The match was played in a 2x30 minute format.

17 January 2026 Club friendly	Lech Poznań	2–1	(Slovakia) Žilina	Dubai, United Arab Emirates
14:00 CET (UTC+01:00); 17:00 UAE Standard Time (UTC+04:00)	Gholizadeh 68'; Palma 82'	90minut Official website	Ďatko 73'	Stadium: ISD Dubai Sports City

24 January 2026 Club friendly	Lech Poznań	2–1	(Uzbekistan) AGMK	Abu Dhabi, United Arab Emirates
08:45 CET (UTC+01:00); 11:45 UAE Standard Time (UTC+04:00)	Agnero 8'; Bengtsson 42'	90minut Official website	Senaga 85'	Stadium: Al-Forsan International Sports Resort

24 January 2026 Club friendly	Lech Poznań	0–1	(Armenia) Noah	Abu Dhabi, United Arab Emirates
14:00 CET (UTC+01:00); 17:00 UAE Standard Time (UTC+04:00)		90minut Official website	Ferreira 89'	Stadium: New York University Abu Dhabi

== Competitions ==
Win Draw Loss

=== Overview ===
Competition	First match	Last match	Starting round	Final position	Record							
Competition	First match	Last match	Starting round	Final position	Pld	W	D	L	GF	GA	GD	Win %
Ekstraklasa	19 July 2025	23 May 2026	Matchday 1	Winners	34	16	12	6	62	45	+17	47.06
Polish Cup	30 October 2025	4 March 2026	Round of 32	Quarter-finals	3	2	0	1	4	2	+2	66.67
Polish Super Cup	13 July 2025		Final	Runners-up	1	0	0	1	1	2	−1	0.00
UEFA Champions League	22 July 2025	12 August 2025	Second qualifying round	Third qualifying round	4	2	1	1	10	5	+5	50.00
UEFA Europa League	21 August 2025	28 August 2025	Play-off round	Play-off round	2	1	0	1	3	6	−3	50.00
UEFA Conference League	2 October 2025	19 March 2026	League phase	Round of 16	10	6	1	3	18	12	+6	60.00
Total					54	27	14	13	98	72	+26	50.00

Source: Competitions

=== Ekstraklasa ===
==== League table ====
Pos	Team	Pld	W	D	L	GF	GA	GD	Pts	Qualification or relegation
1	Lech Poznań (C)	34	16	12	6	62	45	+17	60	Qualification for the Champions League second qualifying round
2	Górnik Zabrze	34	16	8	10	50	38	+12	56 (Note: Head-to-head points: Górnik Zabrze 6, Jagiellonia Białystok 0.)	Qualification for the Champions League second qualifying round
3	Jagiellonia Białystok	34	15	11	8	56	41	+15	56	Qualification for the Europa League third qualifying round (Note: The 2025–26 Polish Cup winners (Górnik Zabrze) qualify for the Europa League third qualifying round. As Górnik Zabrze finished in the top 2, then the berth went to the third place team.)
4	Raków Częstochowa	34	16	7	11	51	40	+11	55	Qualification for the Conference League second qualifying round
5	GKS Katowice	34	14	8	12	51	45	+6	50	Qualification for the Conference League second qualifying round

Source: ekstraklasa.org 90minut.pl
Rules for classification: 1) Points; 2) Head-to-head points; 3) Head-to-head goal difference; 4) Goal difference; 5) Goals scored; 6) Number of wins; 7) Number of away wins; 8) Lower number of points based on yellow and red cards (red card = 3 points, yellow card = 1 point, sending-off = 3 points - including 1 point for first yellow card); 9) Fairplay ranking; 10) Draw.
(Note: Head-to-head record is used only after all the matches between the teams in question have been played)
(C) Champions

==== Results summary ====
Overall								Home						Away					
Pld	W	D	L	GF	GA	GD	Pts	W	D	L	GF	GA	GD	W	D	L	GF	GA	GD
34	16	12	6	62	45	+17	60	7	7	3	39	29	+10	9	5	3	23	16	+7

Source: Ekstraklasa 90minut.pl

==== Results by round ====
Round	1	2	3	4	5	6	7	8	9	10	11	12	13	14	15	16	17	18	19	20	21	22	23	24	25	26	27	28	29	30	31	32	33	34
Ground	H	A	H	A	H	A	H	H	A	H	A	H	A	H	A	H	A	A	H	A	H	A	H	A	A	H	A	H	A	H	A	H	A	H
Result	L	W	W	L	D	D	W	L	W	D	W	D	D	D	L	W	D	D	L	W	W	W	W	L	W	W	D	D	W	W	W	D	W	D
Position	15	10	6	9	9	10	6	8	6	7	6	6	5	5	8	4	7	7	9	7	6	3	3	3	2	1	1	1	1	1	1	1	1	1

Source: Ekstraklasa 90minut.pl
A = Away; H = Home; W = Win; D = Draw; L = Loss; P = Postponed

==== Matches ====
Win Draw Loss Postponed

18 July 2025 Match 1	Lech Poznań	1–4	Cracovia	Poznań
20:30 CEST (UTC+02:00)	Ishak 32' (pen.)	Ekstraklasa; 90minut	Stojilković 2'; Hasić 12', 52'; Minchev 60'	Stadium: Enea Stadion; Attendance: 29,123; Referee: Damian Sylwestrzak (Wrocław)

26 July 2025 Match 2	Lechia Gdańsk	3–4	Lech Poznań	Gdańsk
20:15 CEST (UTC+02:00)	Bobček 22', 30', 87'	Ekstraklasa; 90minut	Þórðarson 48'; Szymczak 55'; Skrzypczak 64'; Ishak 70'	Stadium: Polsat Plus Arena Gdańsk; Attendance: 18,631; Referee: Bartosz Frankowski (Toruń)

2 August 2025 Match 3	Lech Poznań	2–1	Górnik Zabrze	Poznań
20:15 CEST (UTC+02:00)	Bengtsson 60'; Ishak 80'	Ekstraklasa; 90minut	Sow 90'	Stadium: Enea Stadion; Attendance: 31,223; Referee: Szymon Marciniak (Płock)

16 August 2025 Match 5	Lech Poznań	1–1	Korona Kielce	Poznań
20:15 CEST (UTC+02:00)	Palma 83'	Ekstraklasa; 90minut	Błanik 64'	Stadium: Enea Stadion; Attendance: 24,303; Referee: Piotr Lasyk (Bytom)

31 August 2025 Match 7	Lech Poznań	2–1	Widzew Łódź	Poznań
17:30 CEST (UTC+02:00)	Palma 21'; Fiabema 64'	Ekstraklasa; 90minut	Pawłowski 51' (pen.)	Stadium: Enea Stadion; Attendance: 32,877; Referee: Patryk Gryckiewicz (Toruń)

12 September 2025 Match 8	Lech Poznań	1–2	Zagłębie Lubin	Poznań
20:30 CEST (UTC+02:00)	Jagiełło 18'	Ekstraklasa; 90minut	Ławniczak 7'; Kosidis 72'	Stadium: Enea Stadion; Attendance: 24,618; Referee: Damian Kos (Gdańsk)

20 September 2025 Match 9	Bruk-Bet Termalica Nieciecza	0–2	Lech Poznań	Nieciecza
17:30 CEST (UTC+02:00)		Ekstraklasa; 90minut	Ishak 45', 47'	Stadium: Stadion Sportowy Bruk-Bet Termalica; Attendance: 4,595; Referee: Tomasz Kwiatkowski (Warsaw)

24 September 2025 Match 6	Raków Częstochowa	2–2	Lech Poznań	Częstochowa
18:45 CEST (UTC+02:00)	Baráth 64'; Ivi 67' (pen.)	Ekstraklasa; 90minut	Pereira 29'; Palma 45+4'	Stadium: zondacrypto Arena; Attendance: 5,326; Referee: Szymon Marciniak (Płock)
Note: The match originally scheduled for 23 August 2025 has been postponed at the request of the visiting team.

28 September 2025 Match 10	Lech Poznań	2–2	Jagiellonia Białystok	Poznań
14:45 CEST (UTC+02:00)	Bengtsson 46'; Ishak 59' (pen.)	Ekstraklasa; 90minut	Imaz 45+3'; Pietuszewski 48'	Stadium: Enea Stadion; Attendance: 35,299; Referee: Bartosz Frankowski (Toruń)

5 October 2025 Match 11	GKS Katowice	0–1	Lech Poznań	Katowice
17:30 CEST (UTC+02:00)		Ekstraklasa; 90minut	Fiabema 32'	Stadium: Stadion GKS Katowice; Attendance: 12,971; Referee: Karol Arys (Szczecin)

19 October 2025 Match 12	Lech Poznań	2–2	Pogoń Szczecin	Poznań
14:45 CEST (UTC+02:00)	Ishak 51'; Bengtsson 89'	Ekstraklasa; 90minut	Grosicki 15'; Mukairu 90+1'	Stadium: Enea Stadion; Attendance: 39,496; Referee: Wojciech Myć (Lublin)

26 October 2025 Match 13	Legia Warsaw	0–0	Lech Poznań	Warsaw
20:15 CEST (UTC+02:00)		Ekstraklasa; 90minut		Stadium: Stadion Wojska Polskiego; Attendance: 26,498; Referee: Piotr Lasyk (Bytom)

2 November 2025 Match 14	Lech Poznań	2–2	Motor Lublin	Poznań
14:45 CET (UTC+01:00)	Palma 25'; Pereira 45+1'	Ekstraklasa; 90minut	Pereira 9' (o.g.); Ronaldo 20'	Stadium: Enea Stadion; Attendance: 22,692; Referee: Sebastian Krasny (Kraków)

9 November 2025 Match 15	Arka Gdynia	3–1	Lech Poznań	Gdynia
20:15 CET (UTC+01:00)	Espiau 64', 72', 78'	Ekstraklasa; 90minut	Rodríguez 15'	Stadium: Stadion GOSiR; Attendance: 14,064; Referee: Patryk Gryckiewicz (Toruń)

23 November 2025 Match 16	Lech Poznań	4–1	Radomiak Radom	Poznań
14:45 CET (UTC+01:00)	Ishak 45' (pen.), 61'; Rodríguez 52'; Agnero 89'	Ekstraklasa; 90minut	Baldé 73'	Stadium: Enea Stadion; Attendance: 33,877; Referee: Piotr Lasyk (Bytom)

30 November 2025 Match 17	Wisła Płock	0–0	Lech Poznań	Płock
20:15 CET (UTC+01:00)		Ekstraklasa; 90minut		Stadium: Stadion im. Kazimierza Górskiego; Attendance: 11,249; Referee: Wojciech Myć (Lublin)

7 December 2025 Match 18	Cracovia	2–2	Lech Poznań	Kraków
14:45 CET (UTC+01:00)	Maigaard 44'; Praszelik 79'	Ekstraklasa; 90minut	Ishak 17' (pen.); Gholizadeh 81'	Stadium: Stadion Cracovii im. Józefa Piłsudskiego; Attendance: 14,102; Referee: Damian Sylwestrzak (Wrocław)

31 January 2026 Match 19	Lech Poznań	1–3	Lechia Gdańsk	Poznań
20:15 CET (UTC+01:00)	Gholizadeh 26'	Ekstraklasa; 90minut	Neugebauer 2'; Milić 47' (o.g.); Bobček 55'	Stadium: Enea Stadion; Attendance: 17,827; Referee: Karol Arys (Szczecin)

3 February 2026 Match 4	Piast Gliwice	1–0	Lech Poznań	Gliwice
20:30 CET (UTC+01:00)	Katsantonis 83'	Ekstraklasa; 90minut		Stadium: Stadion Miejski im. Piotra Wieczorka; Attendance: 3,118; Referee: Jarosław Przybył (Kluczbork)
Note: The match originally scheduled for 9 August 2025 at 20:15 CEST (UTC+02:00) has been postponed at the request of the visiting team.

7 February 2026 Match 20	Górnik Zabrze	0–1	Lech Poznań	Zabrze
20:15 CET (UTC+01:00)		Ekstraklasa; 90minut	Ishak 10'	Stadium: Stadion im. Ernesta Pohla; Attendance: 21,780; Referee: Damian Sylwestrzak (Wrocław)

15 February 2026 Match 21	Lech Poznań	3–0	Piast Gliwice	Poznań
17:30 CET (UTC+01:00)	Gholizadeh 10'; Rodríguez 13'; Agnero 90'	Ekstraklasa; 90minut		Stadium: Enea Stadion; Attendance: 14,638; Referee: Wojciech Myć (Lublin)

22 February 2026 Match 22	Korona Kielce	1–2	Lech Poznań	Kielce
17:30 CET (UTC+01:00)	Stępiński 54'	Ekstraklasa; 90minut	Gholizadeh 34'; Milić 45+1'	Stadium: Stadion Miejski; Attendance: 12,181; Referee: Piotr Lasyk (Bytom)

1 March 2026 Match 23	Lech Poznań	4–3	Raków Częstochowa	Poznań
17:30 CET (UTC+01:00)	Ishak 19' (pen.); Palma 45'; Milić 55'; Agnero 90+1'	Ekstraklasa; 90minut	Brunes 8' (pen.); Jean Carlos 37'; Ivi 73'	Stadium: Enea Stadion; Attendance: 26,824; Referee: Bartosz Frankowski (Toruń)

7 March 2026 Match 24	Widzew Łódź	2–1	Lech Poznań	Łódź
20:15 CET (UTC+01:00)	Álvarez 34'; Kornvig 52'	Ekstraklasa; 90minut	Þórðarson 28'	Stadium: Stadion Miejski Widzewa; Attendance: 16,468; Referee: Szymon Marciniak (Płock)

15 March 2026 Match 25	Zagłębie Lubin	0–1	Lech Poznań	Lubin
14:45 CET (UTC+01:00)		Ekstraklasa; 90minut	Ishak 7'	Stadium: KGHM Zagłębie Arena; Attendance: 16,033; Referee: Daniel Stefański (Bydgoszcz)

22 March 2026 Match 26	Lech Poznań	4–1	Bruk-Bet Termalica Nieciecza	Poznań
14:45 CET (UTC+01:00)	Bengtsson 33', 36'; Gholizadeh 38'; Ismaheel 87'	Ekstraklasa; 90minut	Isik 65'	Stadium: Enea Stadion; Attendance: 36,239; Referee: Patryk Gryckiewicz (Toruń)

4 April 2026 Match 27	Jagiellonia Białystok	0–0	Lech Poznań	Białystok
20:15 CEST (UTC+02:00)		Ekstraklasa; 90minut		Stadium: Stadion Miejski; Attendance: 19,789; Referee: Jarosław Przybył (Kluczbork)

12 April 2026 Match 28	Lech Poznań	3–3	GKS Katowice	Poznań
17:30 CEST (UTC+02:00)	Jędrych 48' (o.g.); Håkans 74'; Palma 80'	Ekstraklasa; 90minut	Marković 38', 78'; Shkurin 60'	Stadium: Enea Stadion; Attendance: 35,145; Referee: Damian Sylwestrzak (Wrocław)

18 April 2026 Match 29	Pogoń Szczecin	1–2	Lech Poznań	Szczecin
20:15 CEST (UTC+02:00)	Mukairu 80'	Ekstraklasa; 90minut	Kozubal 35'; Palma 61'	Stadium: Stadion Miejski im. Floriana Krygiera; Attendance: 20,991; Referee: Patryk Gryckiewicz (Toruń)

26 April 2026 Match 30	Lech Poznań	4–0	Legia Warsaw	Poznań
17:30 CEST (UTC+02:00)	Gholizadeh 3'; Ishak 31', 42'; Gurgul 38'	Ekstraklasa; 90minut		Stadium: Enea Stadion; Attendance: 40,810; Referee: Piotr Lasyk (Bytom)

2 May 2026 Match 31	Motor Lublin	0–1	Lech Poznań	Lublin
20:15 CEST (UTC+02:00)		Ekstraklasa; 90minut	Bengtsson 40'	Stadium: Arena Lublin; Attendance: 15,200; Referee: Karol Arys (Szczecin)

8 May 2026 Match 32	Lech Poznań	1–1	Arka Gdynia	Poznań
20:30 CEST (UTC+02:00)	Palma 57'	Ekstraklasa; 90minut	Hermoso 52'	Stadium: Enea Stadion; Attendance: 41,598; Referee: Bartosz Frankowski (Toruń)

16 May 2026 Match 33	Radomiak Radom	1–3	Lech Poznań	Radom
20:15 CEST (UTC+02:00)	Grzesik 8'	Ekstraklasa; 90minut	Ishak 16'; Palma 22'; Wålemark 58'	Stadium: Stadion im. Braci Czachorów; Attendance: 13,982; Referee: Karol Arys (Szczecin)

23 May 2026 Match 34	Lech Poznań	2–2	Wisła Płock	Poznań
17:30 CEST (UTC+02:00)	Palma 30'; Wålemark 60'	Ekstraklasa; 90minut	Rogelj 48'; Kamiński 90+5'	Stadium: Enea Stadion; Attendance: 41,529; Referee: Marcin Szczerbowicz (Olsztyn)

=== Polish Cup ===
30 October 2025 Round of 32	Gryf Słupsk	1–2	Lech Poznań	Słupsk
12:00 CET (UTC+01:00)	Wojda 54'	Łączy nas piłka 90minut	Jagiełło 19'; Pereira 33'	Stadium: Stadion Gryfa; Attendance: 1,470; Referee: Mateusz Jenda (Warsaw)

3 December 2025 Round of 16	Piast Gliwice	0–2	Lech Poznań	Gliwice
20:30 CET (UTC+01:00)		Łączy nas piłka 90minut	Ishak 44'; Agnero 69'	Stadium: Stadion Miejski im. Piotra Wieczorka; Attendance: 3,511; Referee: Szymon Marciniak (Płock)

4 March 2026 Quarter-finals	Lech Poznań	0–1	Górnik Zabrze	Poznań
20:30 CET (UTC+01:00)		Łączy nas piłka 90minut	Sadílek 41'	Stadium: Enea Stadion; Attendance: 13,577; Referee: Tomasz Kwiatkowski (Warsaw)

=== Polish Super Cup ===
13 July 2025 Final	Lech Poznań	1–2	Legia Warsaw	Poznań
18:00 CEST (UTC+2)	Szymczak 81'	Łączy nas piłka 90minut	Wszołek 33'; Shkurin 43'	Stadium: Enea Stadion; Attendance: 40,368; Referee: Łukasz Kuźma (Białystok)

=== UEFA Champions League ===
==== Second qualifying round ====
22 July 2025 First leg	Lech Poznań (Poland)	7–1	(Iceland) Breiðablik	Poznań
20:30 CEST (UTC+02:00)	Milić 4'; Ishak 37' (pen.), 45+3' (pen.), 85' (pen.); Pereira 42'; Bengtsson 45+6'; Jagiełło 77'	Report	Gunnlaugsson 28' (pen.)	Stadium: Enea Stadion; Attendance: 24,859; Referee: Jasper Vergoote (Belgium)

30 July 2025 Second leg	Breiðablik (Iceland)	0–1 (1–8 agg.)	(Poland) Lech Poznań	Kópavogur, Iceland
20:30 CEST (UTC+02:00)		Report	Ishak 29'	Stadium: Kópavogsvöllur; Attendance: 1,471; Referee: Adam Ladebäck (Sweden)

==== Third qualifying round ====
6 August 2025 First leg	Lech Poznań (Poland)	1–3	(Serbia) Red Star Belgrade	Poznań
20:30 CEST (UTC+02:00)	Ishak 34'	Report	Krunić 9', 51'; Bruno Duarte 73'	Stadium: Enea Stadion; Attendance: 39,743; Referee: Tobias Stieler (Germany)

12 August 2025 Second leg	Red Star Belgrade (Serbia)	1–1 (4–2 agg.)	(Poland) Lech Poznań	Belgrade, Serbia
21:00 CEST (UTC+02:00)	Ndiaye 45+1'	Report	Ishak 90+3'	Stadium: Red Star Stadium; Attendance: 45,371; Referee: François Letexier (France)

=== UEFA Europa League ===
==== Second qualifying round ====
21 August 2025 First leg	Lech Poznań (Poland)	1–5	(Belgium) Genk	Poznań
20:30 CEST (UTC+02:00)	Jagiełło 19'	Report	Hrošovský 10', 25'; Heynen 33'; Oh Hyeon-gyu 40'; Gurgul 48' (o.g.)	Stadium: Enea Stadion; Attendance: 25,443; Referee: Donatas Rumšas (Lithuania)

28 August 2025 Second leg	Genk (Belgium)	1–2 (6–3 agg.)	(Poland) Lech Poznań	Genk, Belgium
20:00 CEST (UTC+02:00)	Itō 31'	Report	Lisman 43'; Bengtsson 56'	Stadium: Cegeka Arena; Attendance: 12,913; Referee: Davide Massa (Italy)

=== UEFA Conference League ===
==== League phase ====
Pos	Team	Pld	W	D	L	GF	GA	GD	Pts	Qualification
9	(Swiss Football Association) Lausanne-Sport	6	3	2	1	6	3	+3	11	Advance to knockout phase play-offs (seeded)
10	(The Football Association) Crystal Palace	6	3	1	2	11	6	+5	10	Advance to knockout phase play-offs (seeded)
11	(Polish Football Association) Lech Poznań	6	3	1	2	12	8	+4	10	Advance to knockout phase play-offs (seeded)
12	(Turkish Football Federation) Samsunspor	6	3	1	2	10	6	+4	10	Advance to knockout phase play-offs (seeded)
13	(Football Association of Slovenia) Celje	6	3	1	2	8	7	+1	10	Advance to knockout phase play-offs (seeded)

Source: UEFA
Rules for classification: League phase tiebreakers

2 October 2025 Match 1	Lech Poznań (Poland)	4–1	(Austria) Rapid Wien	Poznań
18:45 CEST (UTC+02:00)	Palma 13'; Ishak 21'; Ismaheel 45+2'; Bengtsson 77'	Report	Radulović 64'	Stadium: Enea Stadion; Attendance: 24,779; Referee: Rob Hennessy (Republic of Ireland)

23 October 2025 Match 2	Lincoln Red Imps (Gibraltar)	2–1	(Poland) Lech Poznań	Europa Point, Gibraltar
21:00 CEST (UTC+02:00)	Gómez 33'; Rutjens 88'	Report	Ishak 77' (pen.)	Stadium: Europa Sports Park; Attendance: 1,208; Referee: Chrysovalantis Theouli (Cyprus)

6 November 2025 Match 3	Rayo Vallecano (Spain)	3–2	(Poland) Lech Poznań	Madrid, Spain
21:00 CET (UTC+01:00)	Palazón 58'; De Frutos 83'; García 90+4'	Report	Palma 11'; Kozubal 39'	Stadium: Vallecas Stadium; Attendance: 10,029; Referee: Viktor Kopiyevskyi (Ukraine)

27 November 2025 Match 4	Lech Poznań (Poland)	2–0	(Switzerland) Lausanne-Sport	Poznań
18:45 CET (UTC+01:00)	Ismaheel 67'; Agnero 90+5'	Report		Stadium: Enea Stadion; Attendance: 19,728; Referee: Sigurd Kringstad (Norway)

11 December 2025 Match 5	Lech Poznań (Poland)	1–1	(Germany) Mainz 05	Poznań
21:00 CET (UTC+01:00)	Ishak 41' (pen.)	Report	Kawasaki 28'	Stadium: Enea Stadion; Attendance: 28,139; Referee: Andrei Chivulete (Romania)

18 December 2025 Match 6	Sigma Olomouc (Czech Republic)	1–2	(Poland) Lech Poznań	Olomouc, Czech Republic
21:00 CET (UTC+01:00)	Král 84'	Report	Ishak 35', 45+1' (pen.)	Stadium: Andrův stadion Attendance: 6,267; Referee: Patrik Kolarić (Croatia)

==== Knockout round play-offs ====
19 February 2026 First leg	KuPS (Finland)	0–2	(Poland) Lech Poznań	Tampere, Finland
18:45 CET (UTC+01:00)		Report	Kozubal 9'; Ismaheel 41'	Stadium: Tammelan Stadion; Attendance: 3,756; Referee: Aliyar Aghayev (Azerbaijan)

26 February 2026 Second leg	Lech Poznań (Poland)	1–0 (3–0 agg.)	(Finland) KuPS	Poznań
21:00 CET (UTC+01:00)	Rodríguez 65'	Report		Stadium: Enea Stadion; Attendance: 15,172; Referee: Vasilios Fotias (Greece)

==== Round of 16 ====
12 March 2026 First leg	Lech Poznań (Poland)	1–3	(Ukraine) Shakhtar Donetsk	Poznań
18:45 CET (UTC+01:00)	Ishak 70'	Report	Marlon Gomes 36'; Newerton 48'; Isaque 85'	Stadium: Enea Stadion; Attendance: 36,290; Referee: Rohit Saggi (Norway)

19 March 2026 Second leg	Shakhtar Donetsk (Ukraine)	1–2 (4–3 agg.)	(Poland) Lech Poznań	Kraków, Poland (Note: Due to the Russian invasion of Ukraine, Ukrainian teams are required to play their home matches at neutral venues until further notice. Therefore, Shakhtar Donetsk will play their home matches at Henryk Reyman Municipal Stadium, Kraków, Poland, instead of their regular stadium, Donbas Arena, Donetsk.)
21:00 CET (UTC+01:00)	Moutinho 67' (o.g.)	Report	Ishak 13', 45+7' (pen.)	Stadium: Henryk Reyman Municipal Stadium; Attendance: 17,754; Referee: Sander van der Eijk (Netherlands)

== Statistics ==
=== Appearances and goals ===
As of 23 May 2026.

No.	Pos	Player	Ekstraklasa		Polish Cup		Polish Super Cup		UEFA		Total	
No.	Pos	Player	Apps	Goals	Apps	Goals	Apps	Goals	Apps	Goals	Apps	Goals
Goalkeepers
1	GK	(Bulgaria) Plamen Andreev	1	0	0	0	0	0	0	0	1	0
33	GK	(Poland) Mateusz Pruchniewski	0	0	0	0	0	0	0	0	0	0
41	GK	(Poland) Bartosz Mrozek	33	0	3	0	1	0	16	0	53	0
Defenders
2	DF	(Portugal) Joel Pereira	26+5	2	3	1	1	0	11+3	1	49	4
3	DF	(Sweden) Alex Douglas	6+1	0	1	0	1	0	3+3	0	15	0
4	DF	(Portugal) João Moutinho	7+5	0	2	0	0	0	7+3	0	24	0
15	DF	(Poland) Michał Gurgul	27+4	1	1	0	1	0	10+2	0	45	1
16	DF	(Croatia) Antonio Milić	24	2	0	0	1	0	10	1	35	3
20	DF	(Poland) Robert Gumny	11+10	0	0+1	0	1	0	4+4	0	31	0
27	DF	(Poland) Wojciech Mońka	19	0	2	0	0	0	9+1	0	31	0
72	DF	(Poland) Mateusz Skrzypczak	17+4	1	3	0	0+1	0	11+3	0	39	1
90	DF	(Poland) Hubert Janyszka	0+1	0	0	0	0	0	0	0	1	0
Midfielders
6	MF	(Kenya) Timothy Ouma	12+9	0	1	0	0	0	6+6	0	34	0
8	MF	(Iran) Ali Gholizadeh	13+6	6	2	0	0	0	4+4	0	29	6
10	MF	(Sweden) Patrik Wålemark	11+6	2	0+1	0	0	0	1+3	0	22	2
11	MF	(Finland) Daniel Håkans	0+9	1	0	0	0	0	0+1	0	10	1
14	MF	(Sweden) Leo Bengtsson	26+7	6	2+1	0	0+1	0	7+6	3	50	9
22	MF	(Poland) Radosław Murawski	0+3	0	0	0	0	0	0	0	3	0
23	MF	(Iceland) Gísli Þórðarson	5+8	2	0+3	0	0	0	5+6	0	27	2
24	MF	(Poland) Filip Jagiełło	17+10	1	2	1	1	0	7+1	2	38	4
43	MF	(Poland) Antoni Kozubal	30+2	1	2+1	0	1	0	14+2	2	52	3
44	MF	(Poland) Tymoteusz Gmur	0	0	0	0	0	0	0	0	0	0
53	MF	(Poland) Sammy Dudek	0+1	0	0+1	0	0	0	0	0	2	0
56	MF	(Poland) Kornel Lisman	4+9	0	0	0	0	0	2+5	1	20	1
77	MF	(Honduras) Luis Palma	18+13	10	1	0	0	0	13+2	2	47	12
88	MF	(Nigeria) Taofeek Ismaheel	9+12	1	2+1	0	0	0	5+5	3	34	4
99	MF	(Spain) Pablo Rodríguez	21+6	3	3	0	0	0	10+2	1	42	4
Forwards
7	FW	(Ivory Coast) Yannick Agnero	4+23	3	0+3	1	0	0	1+9	1	40	5
9	FW	(Sweden) Mikael Ishak	29+2	16	3	1	1	0	14+1	14	50	31
54	FW	(Poland) Kamil Jakóbczyk	0+1	0	0	0	0	0	0	0	1	0
Players who appeared for Lech and left the club during the season:
7	MF	(Portugal) Afonso Sousa	0	0	0	0	1	0	1	0	2	0
17	FW	(Poland) Filip Szymczak	2+2	1	0	0	0+1	1	2+3	0	10	2
19	FW	(Norway) Bryan Fiabema	2+8	2	0+1	0	1	0	3+4	0	19	2
21	MF	(Poland) Bartłomiej Barański	0	0	0	0	0	0	0+1	0	1	0

=== Goalscorers ===
As of 23 May 2026.

Place	Number	Position	Nation	Name	Ekstraklasa	Polish Cup	Polish Super Cup	UEFA	Total
1	9	FW	(Sweden)	Mikael Ishak	16	1	0	14	31
2	77	MF	(Honduras)	Luis Palma	10	0	0	2	12
3	14	MF	(Sweden)	Leo Bengtsson	6	0	0	3	9
4	8	MF	(Iran)	Ali Gholizadeh	6	0	0	0	6
5	7	FW	(Ivory Coast)	Yannick Agnero	3	1	0	1	5
6	2	DF	(Portugal)	Joel Pereira	2	1	0	1	4
6	24	MF	(Poland)	Filip Jagiełło	1	1	0	2	4
6	88	MF	(Nigeria)	Taofeek Ismaheel	1	0	0	3	4
6	99	MF	(Spain)	Pablo Rodríguez	3	0	0	1	4
10	16	DF	(Croatia)	Antonio Milić	2	0	0	1	3
10	43	MF	(Poland)	Antoni Kozubal	1	0	0	2	3
12	10	MF	(Sweden)	Patrik Wålemark	2	0	0	0	2
12	17	FW	(Poland)	Filip Szymczak	1	0	1	0	2
12	19	FW	(Norway)	Bryan Fiabema	2	0	0	0	2
12	23	MF	(Iceland)	Gísli Þórðarson	2	0	0	0	2
16	11	MF	(Finland)	Daniel Håkans	1	0	0	0	1
16	15	DF	(Poland)	Michał Gurgul	1	0	0	0	1
16	56	MF	(Poland)	Kornel Lisman	0	0	0	1	1
16	72	DF	(Poland)	Mateusz Skrzypczak	1	0	0	0	1
16	Own goal				1	0	0	0	1
TOTALS					62	4	1	31	98

=== Assists ===
As of 23 May 2026.

Place	Number	Position	Nation	Name	Ekstraklasa	Polish Cup	Polish Super Cup	UEFA	Total
1	2	DF	(Portugal)	Joel Pereira	5	1	0	3	9
2	9	FW	(Sweden)	Mikael Ishak	5	1	0	2	8
2	77	MF	(Honduras)	Luis Palma	6	0	0	2	8
4	15	DF	(Poland)	Michał Gurgul	4	0	0	2	6
5	24	MF	(Poland)	Filip Jagiełło	4	0	0	1	5
6	8	MF	(Iran)	Ali Gholizadeh	4	0	0	0	4
6	88	MF	(Nigeria)	Taofeek Ismaheel	1	0	0	3	4
6	99	MF	(Spain)	Pablo Rodríguez	2	1	0	1	4
9	14	MF	(Sweden)	Leo Bengtsson	3	0	0	0	3
9	43	MF	(Poland)	Antoni Kozubal	1	0	0	2	3
11	23	MF	(Iceland)	Gísli Þórðarson	2	0	0	0	2
12	4	DF	(Portugal)	João Moutinho	0	0	0	1	1
12	6	MF	(Kenya)	Timothy Ouma	1	0	0	0	1
12	7	MF	(Portugal)	Afonso Sousa	0	0	1	0	1
12	10	MF	(Sweden)	Patrik Wålemark	1	0	0	0	1
12	16	DF	(Croatia)	Antonio Milić	1	0	0	0	1
12	17	FW	(Poland)	Filip Szymczak	0	0	0	1	1
12	19	FW	(Norway)	Bryan Fiabema	0	0	0	1	1
12	56	MF	(Poland)	Kornel Lisman	1	0	0	0	1
TOTALS					41	3	1	19	64

=== Clean sheets ===
As of 23 May 2026.

Place	Number	Nation	Name	Ekstraklasa	Polish Cup	Polish Super Cup	UEFA	Total
1	41	(Poland)	Bartosz Mrozek	10	1	0	4	15
2	1	(Bulgaria)	Plamen Andreev	0	0	0	0	0
TOTALS				10	1	0	4	15

=== Disciplinary record ===
As of 23 May 2026.

Number	Position	Nation	Name	Ekstraklasa			Polish Cup			Polish Super Cup			UEFA			Total		
Number	Position	Nation	Name	Yellow card	(yellow card) (yellow-red card)	Red card	Yellow card	(yellow card) (yellow-red card)	Red card	Yellow card	(yellow card) (yellow-red card)	Red card	Yellow card	(yellow card) (yellow-red card)	Red card	Yellow card	(yellow card) (yellow-red card)	Red card
1	GK	(Bulgaria)	Plamen Andreev	0	0	0	–									0	0	0
2	DF	(Portugal)	Joel Pereira	2	0	0	1	0	0	0	0	0	2	0	0	5	0	0
3	DF	(Sweden)	Alex Douglas	0	0	0	0	0	0	0	0	0	0	0	0	0	0	0
4	DF	(Portugal)	João Moutinho	4	0	0	0	0	0	–			1	0	0	5	0	0
6	MF	(Kenya)	Timothy Ouma	3	1	0	1	0	0	–			2	0	0	6	1	0
7	FW	(Ivory Coast)	Yannick Agnero	1	0	0	0	0	0	–			1	0	0	2	0	0
8	MF	(Iran)	Ali Gholizadeh	3	0	0	0	0	0	–			1	0	0	4	0	0
9	FW	(Sweden)	Mikael Ishak	4	0	0	0	0	0	0	0	1	0	0	0	5	0	0
10	MF	(Sweden)	Patrik Wålemark	1	0	0	0	0	0	–			0	0	0	1	0	0
11	MF	(Finland)	Daniel Håkans	0	0	0	–						1	0	0	1	0	0
14	MF	(Sweden)	Leo Bengtsson	3	0	0	1	0	0	1	0	0	0	0	0	5	0	0
15	DF	(Poland)	Michał Gurgul	1	0	0	0	0	0	0	0	0	1	0	0	2	0	0
16	DF	(Croatia)	Antonio Milić	5	0	0	–			0	0	0	2	0	0	7	0	0
20	DF	(Poland)	Robert Gumny	4	0	0	0	0	0	0	0	0	2	0	0	6	0	0
22	MF	(Poland)	Radosław Murawski	0	0	0	–									0	0	0
23	MF	(Iceland)	Gísli Þórðarson	1	0	0	0	0	0	–			0	0	0	1	0	0
24	MF	(Poland)	Filip Jagiełło	1	0	0	0	0	0	0	0	0	1	0	0	2	0	0
27	DF	(Poland)	Wojciech Mońka	1	0	0	0	0	0	–			1	0	0	2	0	0
33	GK	(Poland)	Mateusz Pruchniewski	–												0	0	0
41	GK	(Poland)	Bartosz Mrozek	2	0	0	0	0	0	0	0	0	1	0	0	3	0	0
43	MF	(Poland)	Antoni Kozubal	7	0	0	0	0	0	1	0	0	1	0	0	9	0	0
44	MF	(Poland)	Tymoteusz Gmur	–												0	0	0
53	MF	(Poland)	Sammy Dudek	0	0	0	0	0	0	–						0	0	0
54	FW	(Poland)	Kamil Jakóbczyk	0	0	0	–									0	0	0
56	MF	(Poland)	Kornel Lisman	0	0	0	–						0	0	0	0	0	0
72	DF	(Poland)	Mateusz Skrzypczak	2	0	0	0	0	0	0	0	0	1	0	0	3	0	0
77	MF	(Honduras)	Luis Palma	3	0	1	0	0	0	–			0	0	0	3	0	1
88	MF	(Nigeria)	Taofeek Ismaheel	2	0	0	0	0	0	–			0	0	0	2	0	0
90	DF	(Poland)	Hubert Janyszka	0	0	0	–									0	0	0
99	MF	(Spain)	Pablo Rodríguez	2	1	0	0	0	0	–			1	0	0	3	1	0
Players who appeared for Lech and left the club during the season:
7	MF	(Portugal)	Afonso Sousa	–						0	0	0	0	0	0	0	0	0
17	FW	(Poland)	Filip Szymczak	1	0	0	–			1	0	0	0	0	0	2	0	0
19	FW	(Norway)	Bryan Fiabema	1	0	0	0	0	0	0	0	0	1	0	0	2	0	0
21	MF	(Poland)	Bartłomiej Barański	–									0	0	0	0	0	0
TOTALS				54	2	1	3	0	0	3	0	0	21	0	0	81	2	1

=== Home attendances ===
As of 23 May 2026.

	Matches	Total attendances	Average attendance	Highest attendance	Lowest attendance
Ekstraklasa	17	528,118	31,066	41,598	14,638
Polish Cup	1	13,577	13,577	13,577	13,577
Polish Super Cup	1	40,368	40,368	40,368	40,368
UEFA	8	214,153	26,769	39,743	15,172
Total	27	796,216	29,489	41,598	13,577
