= Mateusz Szwoch =

Polish footballer

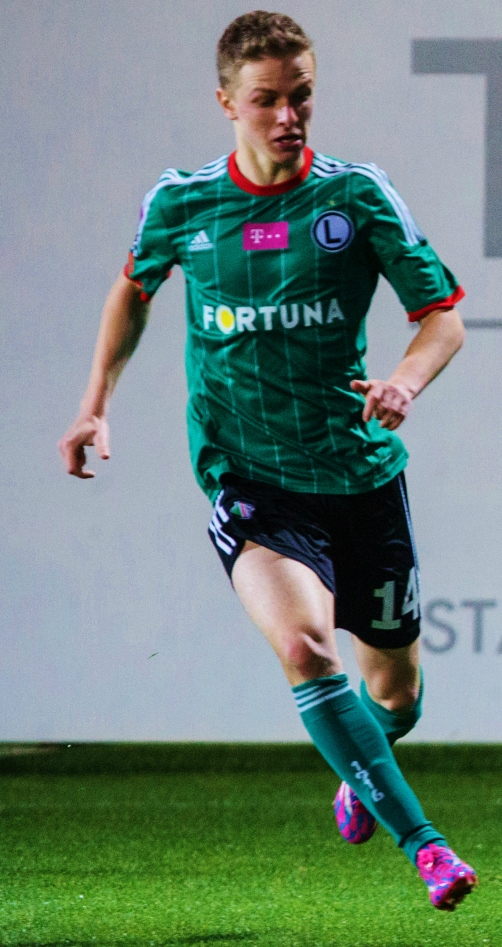
- Szwoch with Legia Warsaw in 2015

Personal information
- Date of birth: 19 March 1993 (age 33)
- Place of birth: Starogard Gdański, Poland
- Height: 1.80 m (5 ft 11 in)
- Position: Midfielder

Team information
- Current team: Resovia
- Number: 14

Youth career
- 2005–2006: Borowiak Czersk
- 2006–2007: Gedania Gdańsk
- 2007: Borowiak Czersk
- 2008–2011: Arka Gdynia

Senior career*
Years	Team	Apps	(Gls)
2011–2014	Arka Gdynia	72	(12)
2014–2018	Legia Warsaw	9	(0)
2014	Legia Warsaw II	3	(1)
2016–2017	→ Arka Gdynia (loan)	50	(5)
2017–2018	→ Arka Gdynia (loan)	34	(10)
2018–2024	Wisła Płock	173	(21)
2024–2026	Ruch Chorzów	61	(6)
2026–	Resovia	0	(0)

International career
2012–2013	Poland U20	6	(0)
- * Club domestic league appearances and goals as of 14:53, 29 May 2026 (UTC)

Mateusz Szwoch (born 19 March 1993) is a Polish professional footballer who plays as a midfielder for II liga club Resovia.

== Honours ==
Arka Gdynia

- I liga: 2015–16
- Polish Cup: 2016–17
