= Kacper Michalski =

Polish footballer (born 2000)

Personal information
- Date of birth: 3 January 2000 (age 26)
- Place of birth: Kostrzyn nad Odrą, Poland
- Height: 1.87 m (6 ft 2 in)
- Position: Right-back

Team information
- Current team: Polonia Bytom
- Number: 10

Youth career
- GKP Gorzów Wielkopolski
- Impuls Wawrów
- Legia Warsaw
- Hertha BSC
- 2013–2017: Pogoń Szczecin

Senior career*
Years	Team	Apps	(Gls)
2017	Pogoń Szczecin II	1	(0)
2018–2019	Górnik Zabrze II	23	(4)
2018–2019	Górnik Zabrze	11	(0)
2019–2020	GKS Katowice	30	(2)
2020–2022	Górnik Zabrze	5	(0)
2021	Górnik Zabrze II	2	(0)
2021	→ Wigry Suwałki (loan)	14	(2)
2022	→ Wigry Suwałki (loan)	13	(2)
2022–2024	Ruch Chorzów	49	(3)
2024–2025	Warta Poznań	31	(4)
2025–	Polonia Bytom	30	(2)

International career
2018–2019	Poland U19	8	(0)
2018	Poland U20	1	(0)
- * Club domestic league appearances and goals as of 08:52, 27 May 2026 (UTC)

Kacper Michalski (born 3 January 2000) is a Polish professional footballer who plays as a right-back for I liga club Polonia Bytom.

== Career ==
=== GKS Katowice ===
On 16 July 2019, Michalski was sold to GKS Katowice in the Polish II liga.

=== Return to Górnik Zabrze ===
On 19 August 2020, Górnik Zabrze activated the buy-back option that was included in the transfer to GKS. Michalski signed a new two-year contract with Górnik. On 1 September 2021, he was loaned to II liga side Wigry Suwałki until the end of the year.

=== Ruch Chorzów ===
On 22 June 2022, Michalski joined Górnik's main local rivals, I liga side Ruch Chorzów, on a two-year deal. He was released by the club at the end of the 2023–24 season, which ended with Ruch's relegation back to the second division.

=== Warta Poznań ===
On 8 July 2024, Michalski joined another demoted club Warta Poznań on a one-year deal, with a one-year extension option.

=== Polonia Bytom ===
After Warta's relegation, Michalski signed a two-year deal with I liga side Polonia Bytom on 30 June 2025.

== Career statistics ==
As of match played 24 May 2026

Appearances and goals by club, season and competition
Club	Season	League			Polish Cup		Europe		Other		Total	
Club	Season	Division	Apps	Goals	Apps	Goals	Apps	Goals	Apps	Goals	Apps	Goals
Pogoń Szczecin II	2016–17	III liga, gr. II	1	0	—		—		—		1	0
Górnik Zabrze II	2017–18	III liga, gr. III	14	3	—		—		—		14	3
Górnik Zabrze II	2018–19	III liga, gr. III	9	1	—		—		—		9	1
Górnik Zabrze II	Total		23	4	—		—		—		23	4
Górnik Zabrze	2018–19	Ekstraklasa	11	0	1	0	—		—		12	0
GKS Katowice	2019–20	II liga	30	2	2	0	—		—		32	2
Górnik Zabrze	2020–21	Ekstraklasa	3	0	0	0	—		—		3	0
Górnik Zabrze	2021–22	Ekstraklasa	2	0	—		—		—		2	0
Górnik Zabrze	Total		5	0	0	0	—		—		5	0
Górnik Zabrze II	2021–22	III liga, gr. III	2	0	—		—		—		2	0
Wigry Suwałki (loan)	2021–22	II liga	26	4	1	1	—		1 (Note: Appearance in II liga promotion play-offs)	0	28	5
Ruch Chorzów	2022–23	I liga	29	2	2	0	—		—		31	2
Ruch Chorzów	2023–24	Ekstraklasa	20	1	0	0	—		—		20	1
Ruch Chorzów	Total		49	3	2	0	—		—		51	3
Warta Poznań	2024–25	I liga	31	4	2	0	—		—		33	4
Polonia Bytom	2025–26	I liga	30	2	4	1	—		—		34	3
Career total			208	19	12	2	0	0	1	0	221	21
