= Maciej Sadlok =

Polish footballer (born 1989)

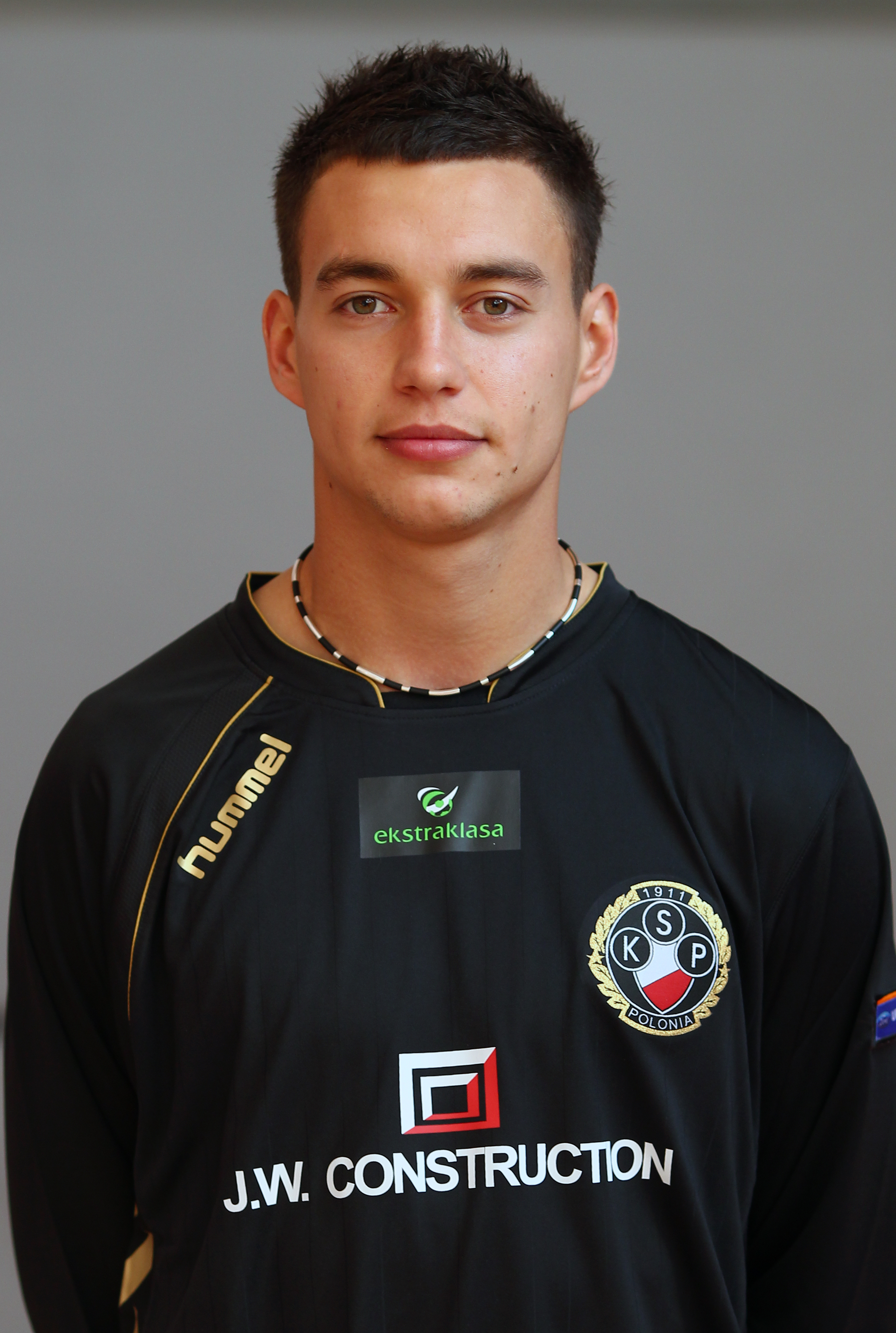
- Sadlok with Polonia Warsaw in 2011

Personal information
- Full name: Maciej Sadlok
- Date of birth: 29 June 1989 (age 37)
- Place of birth: Oświęcim, Poland
- Height: 1.87 m (6 ft 1 1/2 in)
- Positions: Centre-back; left-back

Team information
- Current team: Pasjonat Dankowice
- Number: 28

Youth career
- 2005–2006: Pasjonat Dankowice

Senior career*
Years	Team	Apps	(Gls)
2007–2010	Ruch Chorzów	54	(0)
2010–2012	Polonia Warsaw	31	(0)
2010–2011	→ Ruch Chorzów (loan)	14	(1)
2012–2014	Ruch Chorzów	19	(0)
2014–2022	Wisła Kraków	222	(7)
2022–2025	Ruch Chorzów	68	(2)
2025	Sparta Kazimierza Wielka	10	(0)
2026–	Pasjonat Dankowice	14	(1)

International career
2008–2009	Poland U21	5	(0)
2009–2017	Poland	15	(0)
- * Club domestic league appearances and goals as of 16:17, 30 June 2026 (UTC)

Maciej Sadlok (born 29 June 1989) is a Polish professional footballer who plays as a defender for V liga Silesia club Pasjonat Dankowice.

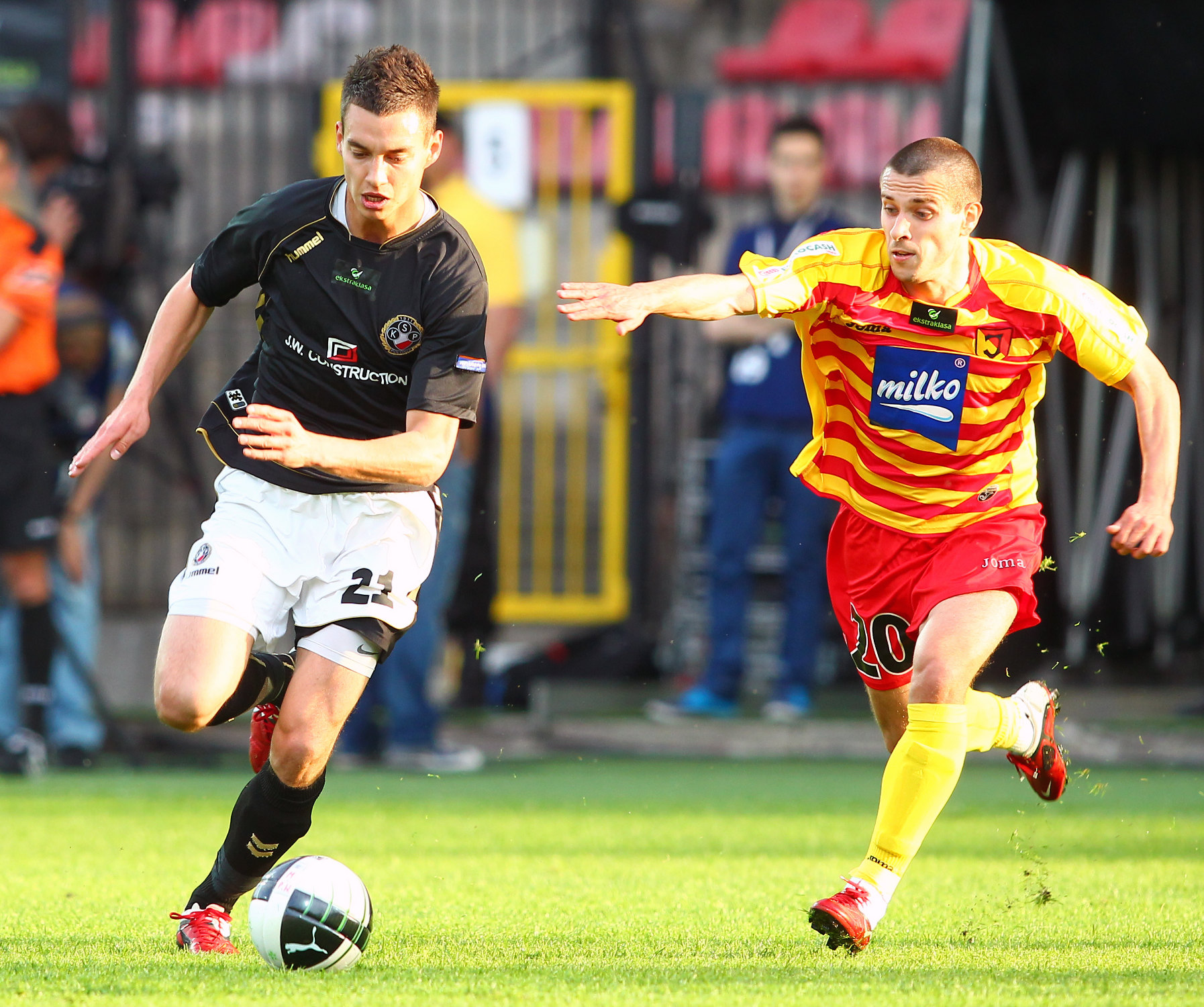
Maciej Sadlok and Maciej Makuszewski

== Club career ==
Sadlok began his career in 2005 with Pasjonat Dankowice. In January 2007 he joined Ruch Chorzów, making his Ekstraklasa debut on 27 July 2007.

On 31 August 2010, it was announced that Sadlok would become a Polonia Warsaw player in February 2011.

== International career ==
He featured for the Poland national under-21 team. In November 2009, Sadlok made his first appearance for the senior team as a late sub against Romania, following that up with a full 90 minutes against Canada.

On 14 November 2016, Sadlok was subbed on in the 83rd minute against Slovenia in a 1–1 draw.

== Career statistics ==
=== Club ===
As of match played 13 June 2026

Appearances and goals by club, season and competition
Club	Season	League			Polish Cup		Europe		Other		Total	
Club	Season	Division	Apps	Goals	Apps	Goals	Apps	Goals	Apps	Goals	Apps	Goals
Ruch Chorzów	2007–08	Ekstraklasa	8	0	2	0	—		5 (Note: Appearances in Ekstraklasa Cup)	0	15	0
Ruch Chorzów	2008–09	Ekstraklasa	17	0	2	0	—		4	0	23	0
Ruch Chorzów	2009–10	Ekstraklasa	29	0	3	0	—		—		32	0
Ruch Chorzów	2010–11	Ekstraklasa	14	1	2	0	5 (Note: Appearances in UEFA Europa League)	0	—		21	1
Ruch Chorzów	Total		68	1	9	0	5	0	9	0	91	1
Polonia Warsaw	2010–11	Ekstraklasa	10	0	2	0	—		—		12	0
Polonia Warsaw	2011–12	Ekstraklasa	21	0	2	0	—		—		23	0
Polonia Warsaw	Total		31	0	4	0	—		—		35	0
Ruch Chorzów	2012–13	Ekstraklasa	11	0	1	0	4	0	—		16	0
Ruch Chorzów	2013–14	Ekstraklasa	8	0	0	0	—		—		8	0
Ruch Chorzów	Total		19	0	1	0	4	0	—		24	0
Wisła Kraków	2014–15	Ekstraklasa	31	2	0	0	—		—		31	2
Wisła Kraków	2015–16	Ekstraklasa	27	1	0	0	—		—		27	1
Wisła Kraków	2016–17	Ekstraklasa	29	0	2	0	—		—		31	0
Wisła Kraków	2017–18	Ekstraklasa	28	0	1	0	—		—		29	0
Wisła Kraków	2018–19	Ekstraklasa	27	0	1	0	—		—		28	0
Wisła Kraków	2019–20	Ekstraklasa	35	1	0	0	—		—		35	1
Wisła Kraków	2020–21	Ekstraklasa	25	2	1	0	—		—		26	2
Wisła Kraków	2021–22	Ekstraklasa	20	1	4	0	—		—		24	1
Wisła Kraków	Total		222	7	9	0	—		—		231	7
Ruch Chorzów	2022–23	I liga	22	1	0	0	—		—		22	1
Ruch Chorzów	2023–24	Ekstraklasa	24	0	0	0	—		—		24	0
Ruch Chorzów	2024–25	I liga	22	1	3	0	—		—		25	1
Ruch Chorzów	Total		68	2	3	0	—		—		71	2
Sparta Kazimierza Wielka	2025–26	III liga, group IV	10	0	—		—		—		10	0
Pasjonat Dankowice	2025–26	Regional league	14	1	—		—		—		14	1
Career total			432	11	26	0	9	0	9	0	476	11

=== International ===
Appearances and goals by national team and year
National team	Year	Apps	Goals
Poland
Poland	2009	2	0
Poland	2010	10	0
Poland	2011	3	0
Total		15	0

== Honours ==
Pasjonat Dankowice

- Regional league Silesia V: 2025–26
