= Tomasz Wełna =

Polish footballer (born 1991)

Tomasz Welna
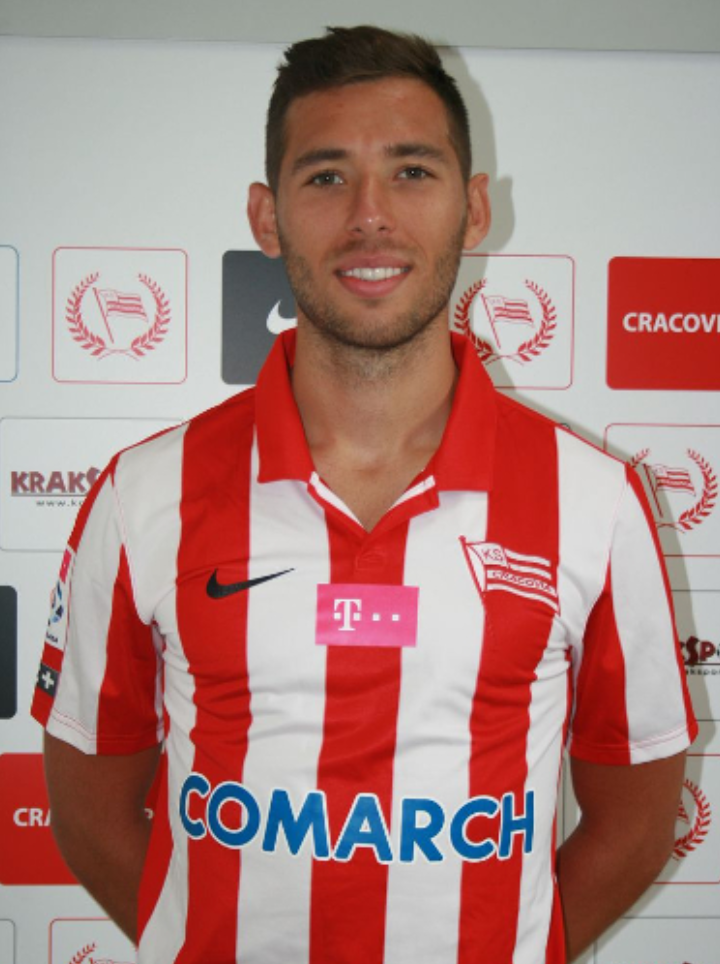
- Wełna with KS Cracovia in 2013

Personal information
- Full name: Tomasz Wełna
- Date of birth: 27 January 1991 (age 35)
- Place of birth: Ciechanów, Poland
- Height: 1.87 m (6 ft 2 in)
- Position: Defender

Team information
- Current team: Mazovia Mińsk Mazowiecki
- Number: 34

Youth career
- Nadnarwianka Pułtusk
- 2006–2009: Polonia Warsaw

Senior career*
Years	Team	Apps	(Gls)
2009–2013	Polonia Warsaw	3	(0)
2011–2012	→ Dolcan Ząbki (loan)	12	(0)
2013–2014	Cracovia	0	(0)
2014	→ Puszcza Niepołomice (loan)	14	(0)
2014–2016	Stomil Olsztyn	44	(3)
2016–2017	Aris Limassol	14	(1)
2017–2018	Olimpia Grudziądz	36	(0)
2018–2019	Widzew Łódź	15	(0)
2019–2020	Pogoń Siedlce	15	(1)
2020–2024	Polonia Warsaw	87	(4)
2024–2025	Kotwica Kołobrzeg	43	(0)
2025–	Mazovia Mińsk Mazowiecki	31	(5)
- * Club domestic league appearances and goals as of 21:35, 22 June 2026 (UTC)

Tomasz Welna (born 27 January 1991) is a Polish professional footballer who plays as a defender for IV liga Masovia club Mazovia Mińsk Mazowiecki.

== Career ==
Wełna started his senior career with Polonia Warsaw. In 2011, he signed for Dolcan Ząbki in the Polish I liga, where he made thirteen appearances and scored zero goals. After that, he played for Cracovia, Puszcza Niepołomice, Stomil Olsztyn, Aris Limassol, Olimpia Grudziądz, Widzew Łódź, and Pogoń Siedlce.

On 27 July 2020, Wełna returned to Polonia Warsaw, then competing in the fourth-tier III liga.

On 3 January 2024, Wełna left Polonia to join II liga side Kotwica Kołobrzeg. He was released with the rest of the senior squad on 22 June 2025; he was the last Kotwica captain before the club disbanded.

On 4 July 2025, Wełna joined fifth division club Mazovia Mińsk Mazowiecki.

== Career statistics ==
As of match played 21 June 2026

Appearances and goals by club, season and competition
Club	Season	League			National cup (Note: Includes Polish Cup, Cypriot Cup)		Europe		Other		Total	
Club	Season	Division	Apps	Goals	Apps	Goals	Apps	Goals	Apps	Goals	Apps	Goals
Dolcan Ząbki (loan)	2011–12	I liga	12	0	1	0	—		—		13	0
Polonia Warsaw	2012–13	Ekstraklasa	3	0	0	0	—		—		3	0
Cracovia	2013–14	Ekstraklasa	0	0	1	0	—		—		1	0
Puszcza Niepołomice (loan)	2013–14	I liga	14	0	—		—		—		14	0
Stomil Olsztyn	2014–15	I liga	25	2	1	0	—		—		26	2
Stomil Olsztyn	2015–16	I liga	19	1	0	0	—		—		19	1
Stomil Olsztyn	Total		44	3	1	0	—		—		45	3
Aris Limassol	2016–17	Cypriot First Division	14	1	1	0	—		—		15	1
Olimpia Grudziądz	2017–18	I liga	31	0	0	0	—		—		31	0
Olimpia Grudziądz	2018–19	II liga	5	0	—		—		—		5	0
Olimpia Grudziądz	Total		36	0	0	0	—		—		36	0
Widzew Łódź	2018–19	II liga	15	0	—		—		—		15	0
Pogoń Siedlce	2019–20	II liga	15	1	1	0	—		—		16	1
Polonia Warsaw	2020–21	III liga, gr. I	31	3	—		—		—		31	3
Polonia Warsaw	2021–22	III liga, gr. I	33	1	—		—		—		33	1
Polonia Warsaw	2022–23	II liga	18	0	—		—		—		18	0
Polonia Warsaw	2023–24	I liga	5	0	3	0	—		—		8	0
Polonia Warsaw	Total		87	4	3	0	—		—		90	4
Kotwica Kołobrzeg	2023–24	II liga	11	0	—		—		—		11	0
Kotwica Kołobrzeg	2024–25	I liga	32	0	1	0	—		—		33	0
Kotwica Kołobrzeg	Total		43	0	1	0	—		—		44	0
Masovia Mińsk Mazowiecki	2025–26	IV liga Masovia	29	5	—		—		2 (Note: Appearances in IV liga promotion play-offs)	0	31	5
Career total			312	14	9	0	0	0	2	0	323	14

== Honours ==
Polonia Warsaw

- II liga: 2022–23
- III liga, group I: 2021–22

Mazovia Mińsk Mazowiecki

- Polish Cup (Siedlce regionals): 2025–26
