= Tomasz Wójtowicz (footballer) =

Polish football player (born 2003)

Personal information
- Full name: Tomasz Wójtowicz
- Date of birth: 19 December 2003 (age 22)
- Place of birth: Katowice, Poland
- Height: 1.81 m (5 ft 11 in)
- Position: Midfielder

Team information
- Current team: Lechia Gdańsk
- Number: 33

Youth career
- 2013–2020: Ruch Chorzów

Senior career*
Years	Team	Apps	(Gls)
2020–2024	Ruch Chorzów	104	(8)
2024–	Lechia Gdańsk	45	(1)

International career
2023	Poland U20	1	(0)
2022–2024	Poland U21	8	(0)
- * Club domestic league appearances and goals as of 08:36, 26 May 2026 (UTC)

Tomasz Wójtowicz (born 19 December 2003) is a Polish professional footballer who plays as a midfielder for I liga club Lechia Gdańsk.

== Career ==
=== Ruch Chorzów ===
He started his career at Ruch Chorzów, he debuted in its senior team on 28 March 2021, in a 4–1 III liga victory over MKS Kluczbork. He scored his first goal in the 38th minute of a 4–0 home victory over Miedź Legnica II, which took place on 2 July. During the 2020–21 season, he appeared in eight matches and scored three goals.

Two years later, on 15 July 2022, Wójtowicz made his debut in I liga in a goalless draw against Skra Częstochowa. A week later, in the 78th minute of a 2–0 victory over Chrobry Głogów, he scored his premiere goal in I liga. Throughout that season, he played in 35 matches, scoring three goals. Wójtowicz helped Ruch Chorzów to advance to the Polish top league, Ekstraklasa.

=== Lechia Gdańsk ===
Following the 2023–24 season, which resulted in Ruch's relegation, he was linked with a move to Jagiellonia Białystok, who won the league title that year, but the transfer never materialised. On 24 July 2024, he was transferred to another Ekstraklasa side Lechia Gdańsk on a three-year deal. After he was assigned with a squad number 33, Wójtowicz made his debut two days later, on 26 July 2024, in a 0–2 loss to Motor Lublin.

== International career ==
He played for the Poland national under-20 and under-21 football team.

== Career statistics ==
As of match played 23 May 2026

Appearances and goals by club, season and competition
Club	Season	League			Polish Cup		Europe		Other		Total	
Club	Season	Division	Apps	Goals	Apps	Goals	Apps	Goals	Apps	Goals	Apps	Goals
Ruch Chorzów	2020–21	III liga, gr. III	8	3	—		—		—		8	3
Ruch Chorzów	2021–22	II liga	33	0	—		—		2 (Note: Appearances in II liga promotion play-offs)	0	35	0
Ruch Chorzów	2022–23	I liga	34	3	1	0	—		—		35	3
Ruch Chorzów	2023–24	Ekstraklasa	27	2	1	0	—		—		28	2
Ruch Chorzów	Total		102	8	2	0	—		2	0	106	8
Lechia Gdańsk	2024–25	Ekstraklasa	23	1	0	0	—		—		23	1
Lechia Gdańsk	2025–26	Ekstraklasa	22	0	3	0	—		—		25	0
Lechia Gdańsk	Total		45	1	3	0	—		—		48	1
Career total			147	9	5	0	0	0	2	0	154	9

== Honours ==
Ruch Chorzów

- III liga, group III: 2020–21
- Polish Cup (Katowice regionals): 2020–21
