= Łukasz Góra =

Polish footballer

Personal information
- Date of birth: 4 October 1993 (age 33)
- Place of birth: Lubliniec, Poland
- Height: 1.86 m (6 ft 1 in)
- Position: Centre-back

Team information
- Current team: Legia Warsaw II
- Number: 44

Youth career
- –2009: Raków Częstochowa
- 2009–2011: Gwarek Zabrze

Senior career*
Years	Team	Apps	(Gls)
2011–2012	Gwarek Zabrze		
2012–2019	Raków Częstochowa	173	(3)
2019–2020	Chrobry Głogów	12	(0)
2020–2024	Stal Rzeszów	120	(9)
2024–2025	Ruch Chorzów	11	(0)
2025	Znicz Pruszków	6	(0)
2025–	Legia Warsaw II	21	(1)
- * Club domestic league appearances and goals as of 21:52, 1 June 2026 (UTC)

Łukasz Góra (born 4 October 1993) is a Polish professional footballer who plays as a centre-back for II liga club Legia Warsaw II.

== Career ==
=== Chrobry Głogów ===
On 28 May 2019 Chrobry Głogów confirmed, that they had signed Góra on a one-year contract.

=== Stal Rzeszów ===
On 29 January 2020, he moved to Stal Rzeszów.

=== Ruch Chorzów ===
On 10 July 2024, Góra was transferred to fellow I liga club Ruch Chorzów on a deal until June 2026, with a one-year extension option. His contract was terminated by mutual consent on 30 January 2025, after making 14 appearances, mostly as a substitute.

=== Znicz Pruszków ===
On 4 February 2025, Góra signed with fellow second-tier club Znicz Pruszków on a one-year deal, with an option for another year. On 1 July 2025, he terminated his contract by mutual consent.

=== Legia Warsaw II ===
On 10 July 2025, Góra joined Legia Warsaw's reserve team, playing in the fourth division, on a deal until June 2027, with an option for another year.

== Honours ==
Raków Częstochowa

- I liga: 2018–19
- II liga: 2016–17

Stal Rzeszów

- II liga: 2021–22

Legia Warsaw II

- III liga, group I: 2025–26
