= Łukasz Moneta =

Polish footballer (born 1994)

Personal information
- Full name: Łukasz Moneta
- Date of birth: 13 May 1994 (age 32)
- Place of birth: Racibórz, Poland
- Height: 1.73 m (5 ft 8 in)
- Position: Left midfielder

Team information
- Current team: Unia Turza Śląska

Youth career
- –2009: LKS Brzezie
- 2010: Unia Racibórz
- 2011–2012: LKS 1908 Nędza

Senior career*
| Years | Team | Apps | (Gls) |
| 2012–2013 | LZS Leśnica | 28 | (8) |
| 2013–2014 | Legia Warsaw II | 40 | (9) |
| 2014–2015 | Legia Warsaw | 2 | (0) |
| 2015 | → Wigry Suwałki (loan) | 33 | (5) |
| 2016–2017 | Ruch Chorzów | 44 | (3) |
| 2017–2019 | Legia Warsaw | 0 | (0) |
| 2017 | Legia Warsaw II | 11 | (1) |
| 2018 | → Zagłębie Lubin (loan) | 10 | (0) |
| 2018 | → Zagłębie Lubin II (loan) | 18 | (9) |
| 2019 | → Bytovia Bytów (loan) | 13 | (1) |
| 2019–2021 | GKS Tychy | 59 | (4) |
| 2021–2022 | Stomil Olsztyn | 34 | (6) |
| 2022–2025 | Ruch Chorzów | 72 | (4) |
| 2025–2026 | Olimpia Grudziądz | 29 | (3) |
| 2026– | Unia Turza Śląska | 0 | (0) |

International career
| 2016–2017 | Poland U21 | 9 | (2) |
- * Club domestic league appearances and goals as of 16:14, 2 June 2026 (UTC)

Łukasz Moneta (born 13 May 1994) is a Polish professional footballer who plays as a left midfielder for IV liga Silesia club Unia Turza Śląska.

== Club career ==
He made his league debut on 2 August 2014 in an Ekstraklasa match against Górnik Zabrze.

== Career statistics ==
As of match played 2 June 2026

Appearances and goals by club, season and competition
| Club | Season | League | | | Polish Cup | | Europe | | Other | | Total | |
| Club | Season | Division | Apps | Goals | Apps | Goals | Apps | Goals | Apps | Goals | Apps | Goals |
|---|---|---|---|---|---|---|---|---|---|---|---|---|
| LZS Leśnica | 2012–13 | III liga, gr. F | 28 | 8 | — | | — | | — | | 28 | 8 |
| Legia Warsaw II | 2013–14 | III liga, gr. A | 27 | 5 | — | | — | | — | | 27 | 5 |
| Legia Warsaw II | 2014–15 | III liga, gr. A | 13 | 4 | — | | — | | — | | 13 | 4 |
| Legia Warsaw II | Total | | 40 | 9 | — | | — | | — | | 40 | 9 |
| Legia Warsaw | 2014–15 | Ekstraklasa | 2 | 0 | 0 | 0 | 0 | 0 | 1 (Note: Appearance in Polish Super Cup) | 0 | 3 | 0 |
| Wigry Suwałki | 2014–15 | I liga | 14 | 2 | — | | — | | — | | 14 | 2 |
| Wigry Suwałki | 2015–16 | I liga | 19 | 3 | 2 | 0 | — | | — | | 21 | 3 |
| Wigry Suwałki | Total | | 33 | 5 | 2 | 0 | — | | — | | 35 | 5 |
| Ruch Chorzów | 2015–16 | Ekstraklasa | 13 | 0 | — | | — | | — | | 13 | 0 |
| Ruch Chorzów | 2016–17 | Ekstraklasa | 31 | 3 | 2 | 0 | — | | — | | 33 | 3 |
| Ruch Chorzów | Total | | 44 | 3 | 2 | 0 | — | | — | | 46 | 3 |
| Legia Warsaw | 2017–18 | Ekstraklasa | 0 | 0 | 3 | 0 | 2 (Note: Appearances in UEFA Champions League) | 0 | 0 | 0 | 5 | 0 |
| Legia Warsaw II | 2017–18 | III liga, gr. I | 11 | 1 | — | | — | | — | | 11 | 1 |
| Zagłębie Lubin (loan) | 2017–18 | Ekstraklasa | 7 | 0 | — | | — | | — | | 7 | 0 |
| Zagłębie Lubin (loan) | 2018–19 | Ekstraklasa | 3 | 0 | 1 | 0 | — | | — | | 4 | 0 |
| Zagłębie Lubin (loan) | Total | | 10 | 0 | 1 | 0 | — | | — | | 11 | 0 |
| Zagłębie Lubin II (loan) | 2017–18 | III liga, gr. III | 3 | 2 | — | | — | | — | | 3 | 2 |
| Zagłębie Lubin II (loan) | 2018–19 | III liga, gr. III | 15 | 7 | — | | — | | — | | 15 | 7 |
| Zagłębie Lubin II (loan) | Total | | 18 | 9 | — | | — | | — | | 18 | 9 |
| Bytovia Bytów (loan) | 2018–19 | I liga | 13 | 1 | — | | — | | — | | 13 | 1 |
| GKS Tychy | 2019–20 | I liga | 26 | 3 | 4 | 0 | — | | — | | 30 | 3 |
| GKS Tychy | 2020–21 | I liga | 33 | 1 | 1 | 0 | — | | — | | 34 | 1 |
| GKS Tychy | Total | | 59 | 4 | 5 | 0 | — | | — | | 64 | 4 |
| Stomil Olsztyn | 2021–22 | I liga | 34 | 6 | 2 | 0 | — | | — | | 36 | 6 |
| Ruch Chorzów | 2022–23 | I liga | 30 | 2 | 2 | 0 | — | | — | | 32 | 2 |
| Ruch Chorzów | 2023–24 | Ekstraklasa | 18 | 1 | 0 | 0 | — | | — | | 18 | 1 |
| Ruch Chorzów | 2024–25 | I liga | 24 | 1 | 4 | 0 | — | | — | | 28 | 1 |
| Ruch Chorzów | Total | | 72 | 4 | 6 | 0 | — | | — | | 54 | 4 |
| Olimpia Grudziądz | 2025–26 | II liga | 28 | 3 | 3 | 0 | — | | 1 (Note: Appearance in II liga promotion play-offs) | 0 | 32 | 3 |
| Career total | | | 392 | 53 | 24 | 0 | 2 | 0 | 2 | 0 | 420 | 53 |

== Honours ==
Legia Warsaw

- Polish Cup: 2017–18
