= Filip Starzyński =

Polish footballer (born 1991)

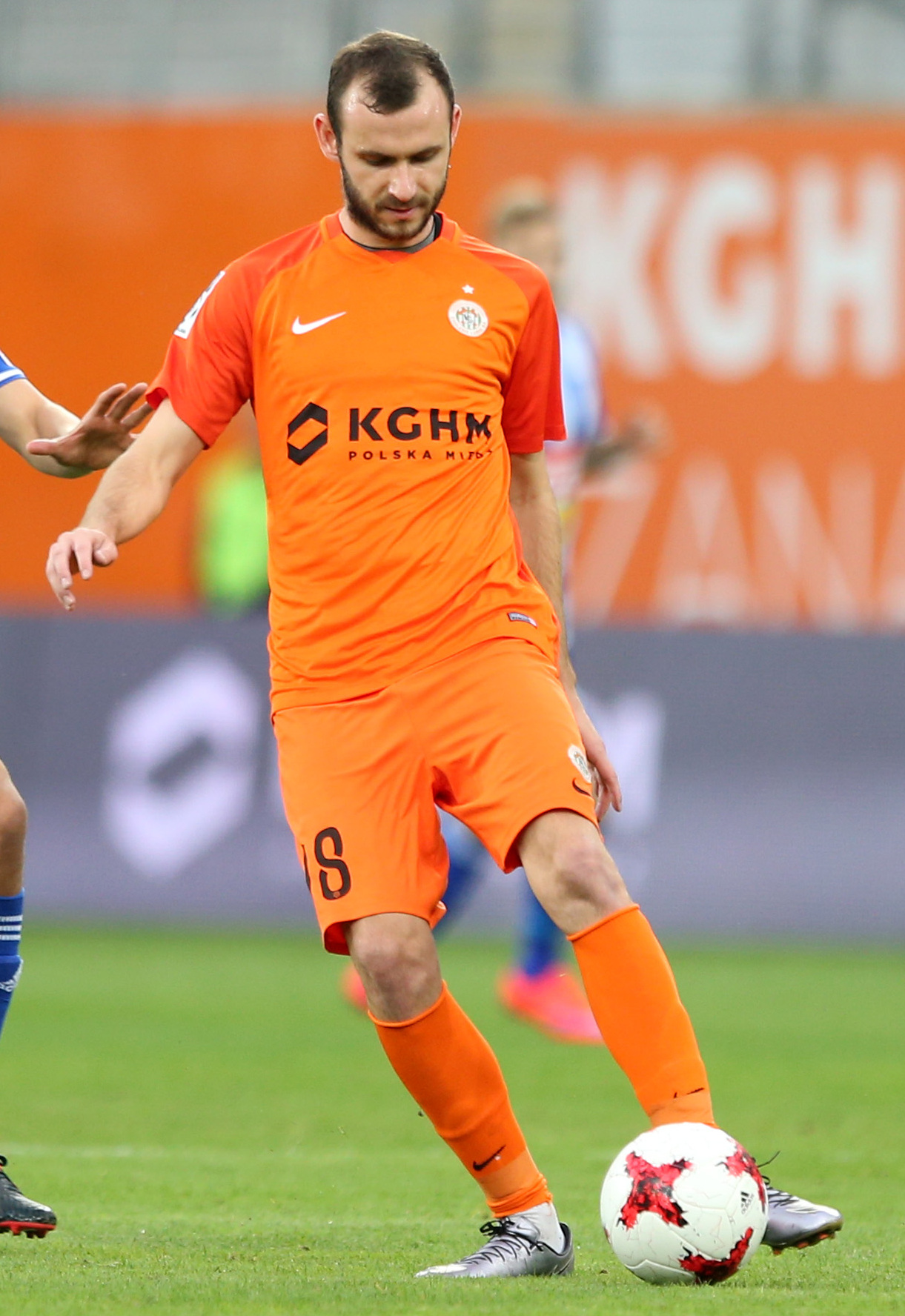
- Starzyński in 2017 with Zagłębie Lubin

Personal information
- Date of birth: 27 May 1991 (age 35)
- Place of birth: Szczecin, Poland
- Height: 1.84 m (6 ft 0 in)
- Position: Attacking midfielder

Team information
- Current team: Górnik Polkowice
- Number: 19

Youth career
- –2007: Wicher Przelewice
- 2007–2009: Salos Szczecin
- 2009–2012: Ruch Chorzów

Senior career*
| Years | Team | Apps | (Gls) |
| 2012–2015 | Ruch Chorzów | 101 | (21) |
| 2013 | Ruch Chorzów II | 3 | (0) |
| 2015–2016 | Lokeren | 9 | (0) |
| 2016 | → Zagłębie Lubin (loan) | 16 | (3) |
| 2016–2023 | Zagłębie Lubin | 204 | (49) |
| 2023–2025 | Ruch Chorzów | 38 | (1) |
| 2026– | Górnik Polkowice | 15 | (0) |

International career
| 2012 | Poland U21 | 2 | (0) |
| 2014–2016 | Poland | 4 | (1) |
- * Club domestic league appearances and goals as of 18:14, 9 June 2026 (UTC)

Filip Starzyński (born 27 May 1991) is a Polish professional footballer who plays as an attacking midfielder for III liga club Górnik Polkowice.

== Career statistics ==
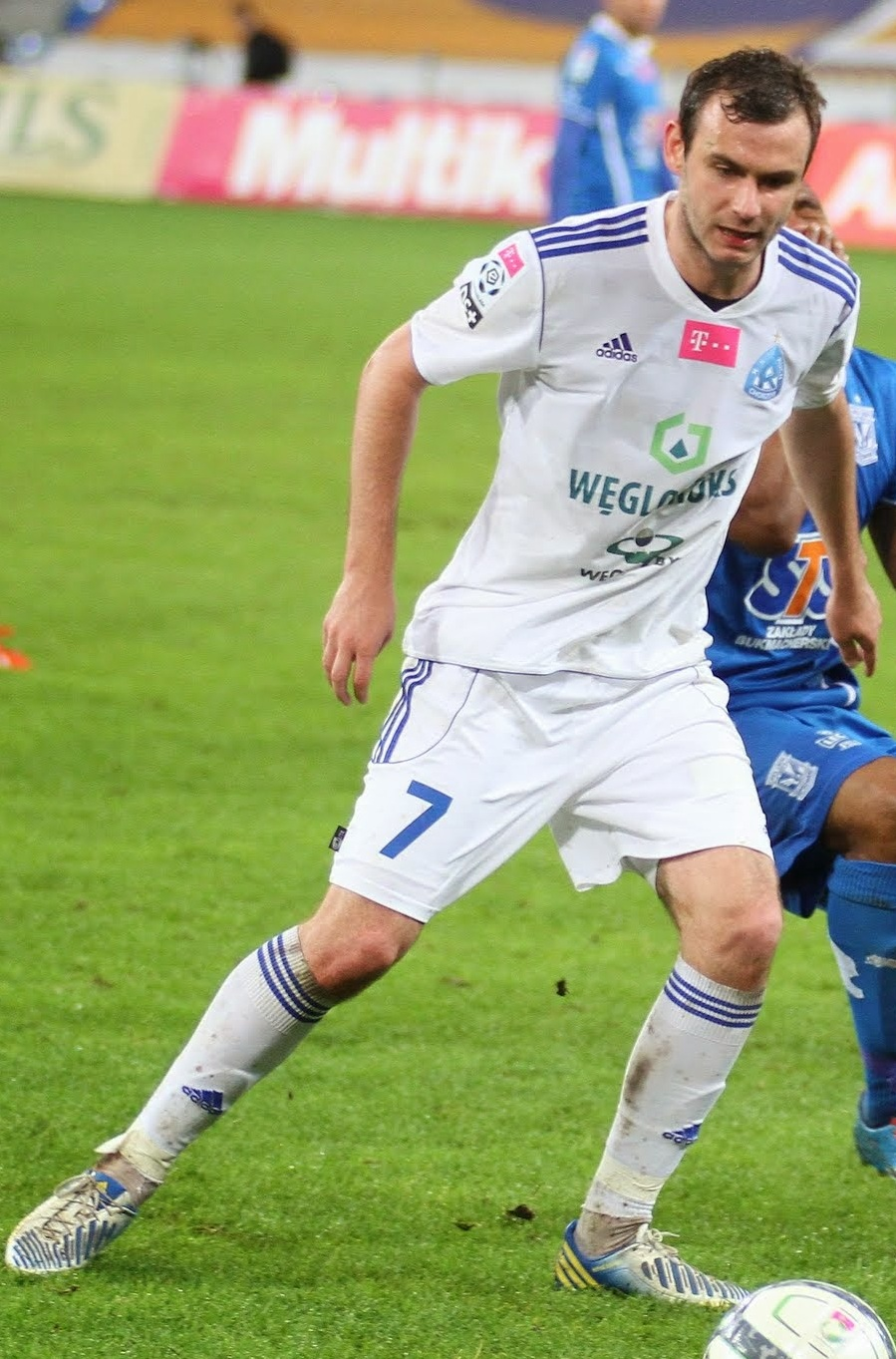
Starzyński in 2014

=== Club ===
As of match played 9 June 2026

Appearances and goals by club, season and competition
| Club | Season | League | | | National cup (Note: Includes Polish Cup, Belgian Cup) | | Continental | | Other | | Total | |
| Club | Season | Division | Apps | Goals | Apps | Goals | Apps | Goals | Apps | Goals | Apps | Goals |
|---|---|---|---|---|---|---|---|---|---|---|---|---|
| Ruch Chorzów | 2011–12 | Ekstraklasa | 3 | 0 | 2 | 0 | — | | — | | 5 | 0 |
| Ruch Chorzów | 2012–13 | Ekstraklasa | 28 | 3 | 6 | 1 | 3 (Note: Appearances in UEFA Europa League) | 0 | — | | 37 | 4 |
| Ruch Chorzów | 2013–14 | Ekstraklasa | 34 | 10 | 1 | 0 | — | | — | | 35 | 10 |
| Ruch Chorzów | 2014–15 | Ekstraklasa | 36 | 8 | 1 | 1 | 6 | 1 | — | | 43 | 10 |
| Ruch Chorzów | Total | | 101 | 21 | 10 | 2 | 9 | 1 | — | | 120 | 24 |
| Ruch Chorzów II | 2013–14 | III liga, group F | 3 | 0 | — | | — | | — | | 3 | 0 |
| Lokeren | 2015–16 | Belgian Pro League | 9 | 0 | 1 | 1 | — | | — | | 10 | 1 |
| Zagłębie Lubin (loan) | 2015–16 | Ekstraklasa | 16 | 3 | 0 | 0 | — | | — | | 16 | 3 |
| Zagłębie Lubin | 2016–17 | Ekstraklasa | 25 | 8 | 1 | 0 | 2 | 0 | — | | 28 | 8 |
| Zagłębie Lubin | 2017–18 | Ekstraklasa | 24 | 6 | 1 | 0 | — | | — | | 25 | 6 |
| Zagłębie Lubin | 2018–19 | Ekstraklasa | 33 | 13 | 0 | 0 | — | | — | | 33 | 13 |
| Zagłębie Lubin | 2019–20 | Ekstraklasa | 37 | 8 | 3 | 1 | — | | — | | 40 | 9 |
| Zagłębie Lubin | 2020–21 | Ekstraklasa | 26 | 7 | 2 | 0 | — | | — | | 28 | 7 |
| Zagłębie Lubin | 2021–22 | Ekstraklasa | 27 | 6 | 3 | 1 | — | | — | | 30 | 7 |
| Zagłębie Lubin | 2022–23 | Ekstraklasa | 32 | 1 | 2 | 2 | — | | — | | 34 | 3 |
| Zagłębie Lubin | Total | | 220 | 52 | 12 | 4 | 2 | 0 | 0 | 0 | 234 | 56 |
| Ruch Chorzów | 2023–24 | Ekstraklasa | 25 | 0 | 0 | 0 | — | | — | | 25 | 0 |
| Ruch Chorzów | 2024–25 | I liga | 13 | 1 | 3 | 0 | — | | — | | 16 | 1 |
| Ruch Chorzów | Total | | 38 | 1 | 3 | 0 | — | | — | | 41 | 1 |
| Górnik Polkowice | 2025–26 | III liga, group III | 14 | 0 | — | | — | | 1 (Note: Appearance in II liga relegation play-offs) | 0 | 15 | 0 |
| Career total | | | 385 | 74 | 26 | 7 | 11 | 1 | 1 | 0 | 423 | 82 |

=== International ===
Appearances and goals by national team and year
| National team | Year | Apps | Goals |
|---|---|---|---|
| Poland | 2014 | 1 | 0 |
| Poland | 2016 | 3 | 1 |
| Total | | 4 | 1 |

Scores and results list Poland's goal tally first, score column indicates score after each Starzyński goal.

List of international goals scored by Filip Starzyński
| No. | Date | Venue | Opponent | Score | Result | Competition |
|---|---|---|---|---|---|---|
| 1 | 26 March 2016 | Stadion Miejski, Wrocław, Poland | Finland | 3–0 | 5–0 | Friendly |

== Honours ==
Górnik Polkowice

- Polish Cup (Legnica regionals): 2025–26

Individual

- Ekstraklasa Player of the Month: March 2016
