= Daniel Szczepan =

Polish association football player (born 1995)

Personal information
- Full name: Daniel Szczepan
- Date of birth: 5 June 1995 (age 31)
- Place of birth: Rydułtowy, Poland
- Height: 1.79 m (5 ft 10 in)
- Position: Forward

Team information
- Current team: Ruch Chorzów
- Number: 95

Youth career
- 2002–2003: Górnik Radlin
- 2003–2011: Gosław-WAP Wodzisław Śląski

Senior career*
Years	Team	Apps	(Gls)
2011–2015	Górnik Pszów		(15)
2015–2018	GKS Jastrzębie	61	(30)
2018–2019	Śląsk Wrocław	15	(0)
2018–2019	Śląsk Wrocław II	14	(14)
2020–2021	GKS Jastrzębie	33	(7)
2021–	Ruch Chorzów	140	(55)
- * Club domestic league appearances and goals as of 14:55, 29 May 2026 (UTC)

Daniel Szczepan (born 5 June 1995) is a Polish professional footballer who plays as a forward for I liga club Ruch Chorzów.

== Career ==
Szczepan began his senior career with Górnik Pszów in 2011, where he made his debut in 2012 against Naprzód Rydułtowy, a team located in the town of his birth, a game in which Szczepan also scored. In total Szczepan scored 15 goals for Górnik. On 5 February 2015, Szczepan joined GKS Jastrzębie. After starting well with Jastrzębie, Szczepan knocked out an opposition player in a friendly for the 2015–16 season against Unia Racibórz. In total Szczepan scored just under one goal every two games for GKS. After a successful time with Jastrzębie, Szczepan joined Śląsk Wrocław in 2018.

== Honours ==
Górnik Pszów

- Regional league Katowice III: 2012–13

GKS Jastrzębie

- II liga: 2017–18
- III liga, group III: 2016–17
- Polish Cup (Silesia regionals): 2015–16
- Polish Cup (Rybnik regionals): 2015–16

Śląsk Wrocław II

- IV liga Lower Silesia East: 2018–19

Individual

- I liga Player of the Month: May 2023
