= Miłosz Kozak =

Polish footballer (born 1997)

Personal information
- Full name: Miłosz Daniel Kozak
- Date of birth: 23 May 1997 (age 29)
- Place of birth: Gostyń, Poland
- Height: 1.76 m (5 ft 9 in)
- Position: Winger

Youth career
- Kania Gostyń
- 2009–2014: Lech Poznań

Senior career*
Years	Team	Apps	(Gls)
2014–2018	Legia Warsaw II	18	(1)
2014	→ Zagłębie Sosnowiec (loan)	10	(0)
2016–2017	→ Wigry Suwałki (loan)	40	(3)
2017–2018	→ Podbeskidzie (loan)	30	(1)
2018–2019	Podbeskidzie	15	(1)
2019–2020	Chrobry Głogów	27	(2)
2020–2021	Radomiak Radom	43	(2)
2022	Spartak Trnava	12	(0)
2023	Górnik Łęczna	21	(3)
2023–2025	Ruch Chorzów	53	(7)
2025–2026	Śląsk Wrocław	12	(1)
2026	Śląsk Wrocław II	0	(0)

International career
2011	Poland U15	2	(0)
2012–2013	Poland U16	9	(1)
2013–2015	Poland U17	8	(2)
2015	Poland U18	1	(0)
2016–2018	Poland U20	3	(0)
- * Club domestic league appearances and goals as of 23:17, 18 February 2026 (UTC)

Miłosz Daniel Kozak (born 23 May 1997) is a Polish professional footballer who plays as a winger.

== Club career ==
On 15 January 2022, it was announced that Kozak would be joining Slovak club Spartak Trnava. He made his debut for the club in a 1–1 draw against Dunajská Streda, playing for 68 minutes. After making 12 league appearances for Spartak, he left the club after not being able to find a first team position.

== Personal life ==
His sister Kinga plays for Napoli and has previously featured for the Poland women's national team.

== Honours ==
Radomiak Radom

- I liga: 2020–21

Spartak Trnava

- Slovak Cup: 2021–22
