= Ruch Chorzów Stadium =

Multi-purpose stadium in Chorzów, Poland

Coordinates: 50°16′56″N 18°56′39″E

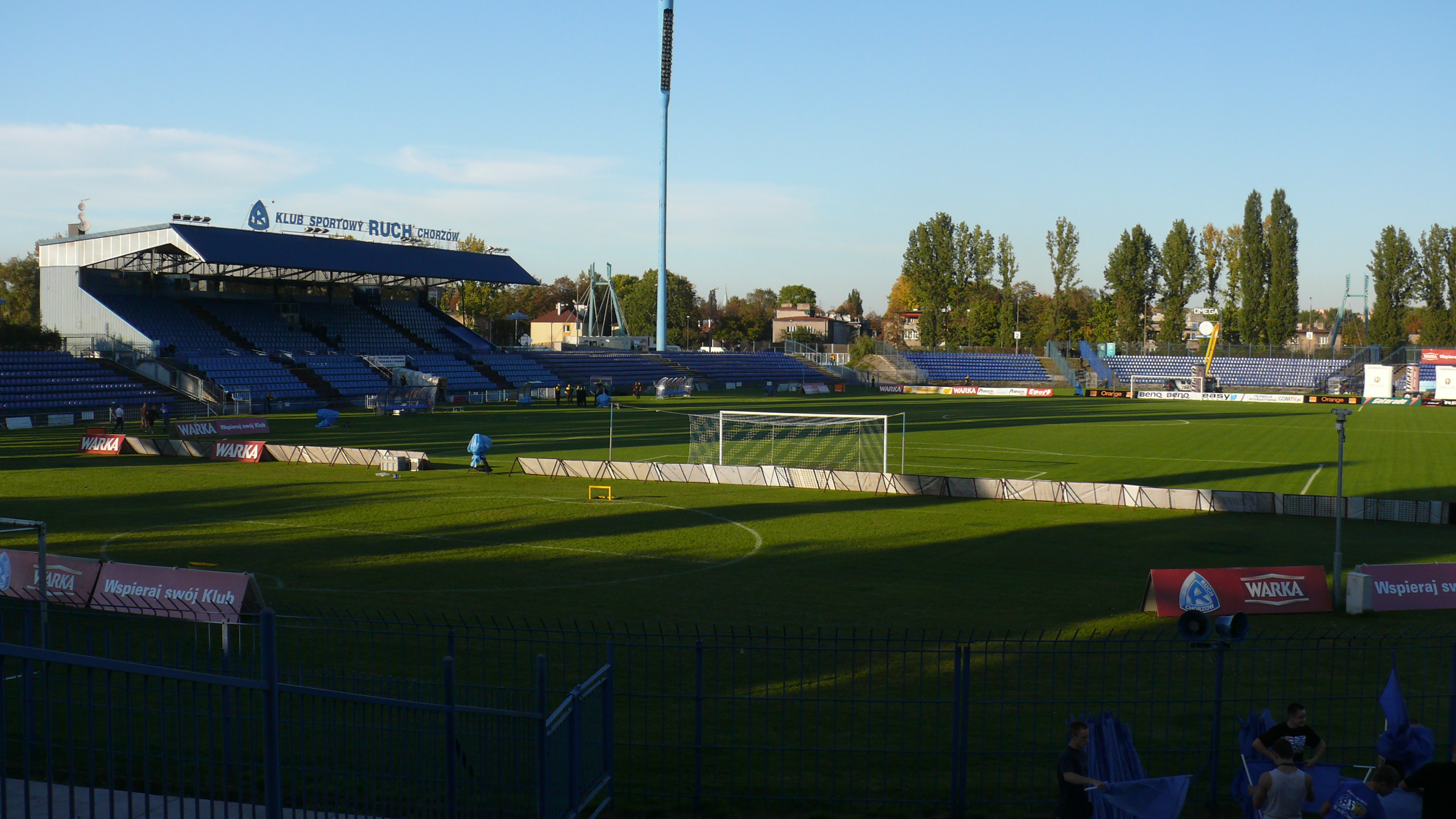
- Interactive map of Ruch Chorzów Stadium
- Location: Chorzów, Poland
- Owner: MORiS Chorzów
- Capacity: 9,300
- Surface: Field (Grass)
- Field size: 107 × 67 m

Construction
- Built: September 29, 1935
- Cost: 180,000 złoty

Tenant
- Ruch Chorzów (Football)

The Ruch Chorzów Stadium (Polish: Stadion Ruchu Chorzów), also known as the Cicha Street Stadium (Stadion przy ulicy Cichej), is a multi-purpose stadium in the Batory district of the town Chorzów, Poland. Built in the years 1934–1935 for the successful Ruch Wielkie Hajduki team and currently is also used mostly for football matches and serves as the home of that club, now known as Ruch Chorzów. The stadium has a capacity of 9,300 people.
