= 2026–27 Qarabağ FK season =

Qarabağ
2026–27 season
- President: Tahir Gözel
- Manager: Gurban Gurbanov
- Stadium: Azersun Arena
- Premier League: 3rd
- Azerbaijan Cup: Last 16
- UEFA Europa League: Second Qualifying Round vs CSKA Sofia
- UEFA Conference League: Play-off round vs Twente
- Top goalscorer: League: Oleksiy Kashchuk (3); All: Two Players (4)
Home colours	Away colours	Third colours

The 2026–27 season is Qarabağ FK's 76th year since its founding and its 35th consecutive season in Azerbaijan's premier league. The team will also compete in the Azerbaijan Cup, and the UEFA Europa League.

== Season overview ==
On 18 May, Qarabağ announced the signing of Jaly Mouaddib from Omonia Aradippou on a contract until the summer of 2029.

On 24 May, Qarabağ announced the signing of Zakaria Sawo from Djurgården on a contract until the summer of 2029.

On 11 June, Qarabağ announced that they had extended their contract with Pedro Bicalho until the summer of 2029.

On 16 June, Qarabağ announced the signing of Samuel Lobato from Portimonense on a contract until the summer of 2029.

On 17 June, Qarabağ announced the signing of Bruno Langa from UD Almería on a contract until the summer of 2029.

On 21 June, Qarabağ announced the signing of Martin Zlomislić from HNK Rijeka on a contract until the summer of 2029, with the option of an additional year, and that they had extended their contract with Badavi Guseynov until the summer of 2027.

On 25 June, Qarabağ announced the signing of Renaldo Cephas from Nizhny Novgorod on a contract until the summer of 2029.

On 3 July, Qarabağ announced the signing of Bence Várkonyi from Zalaegerszegi on a contract until the summer of 2029.

On 5 July, Qarabağ announced the signing of Cebrail Makreckis from Ferencváros on a contract until the summer of 2029.

On 10 July, Qarabağ sold Camilo Durán to Scottish Premiership club Celtic, for an undisclosed fee.

On 16 August, Qarabağ announced that Abdellah Zoubir had left the club after his contract was terminated by mutual agreement.

On 27 August, Qarabağ announced the signing of Reda Khadra from Stade de Reims to a two-year contract, with the option of an additional year, and the signing of Taofeek Ismaheel from Górnik Zabrze to a three-year contract.

On 30 August, Qarabağ announced the season-long loan signing of Diego Rosa from APOEL, with an option to make the move permanent.

On 31 August, Dani Bolt left Qarabağ after his contract was ended by mutual agreement.

== Squad ==
As of match played 6 November 2026

No.	Name	Nationality	Position	Date of birth (age)	Signed from	Signed in	Contract ends	Apps.	Goals
Goalkeepers
1	Shakhruddin Magomedaliyev	(Azerbaijan)	GK	12 June 1994 (age 32)	Sumgayit	2024		159	0
23	Martin Zlomislić	(Bosnia and Herzegovina)	GK	16 August 1998 (age 28)	HNK Rijeka	2026	2029(+1)	7	0
Defenders
2	Matheus Silva	(Brazil)	DF	3 October 1997 (age 29)	Lokomotiv Plovdiv	2023	2025 (+2)	149	5
4	Bence Várkonyi	(Hungary)	DF	30 June 2005 (age 21)	Zalaegerszegi	2026	2029	18	0
5	Bruno Langa	(Mozambique)	DF	31 October 1997 (age 29)	Almería	2026	2029	18	0
13	Behlul Mustafazade	(Azerbaijan)	DF	27 February 1997 (age 29)	Unattached	2021		165	6
25	Cebrail Makreckis	(Latvia)	DF	10 May 2000 (age 26)	Ferencváros	2026	2029	14	0
26	Amin Rzayev	(Azerbaijan)	DF	12 October 2009 (age 17)	Academy	2025		1	0
30	Abbas Huseynov	(Azerbaijan)	DF	13 June 1995 (age 31)	Inter Baku	2017		182	5
32	Hikmat Jabrayilzade	(Azerbaijan)	DF	2 August 2007 (age 19)	Academy	2024		9	0
39	Jérémie Gnali	(France)	DF	12 April 2002 (age 24)	AEK Larnaca	2026	2028	4	0
44	Elvin Cafarguliyev	(Azerbaijan)	DF	26 October 2000 (age 26)	Youth team	2019		234	10
55	Badavi Guseynov	(Azerbaijan)	DF	11 July 1991 (age 35)	Anzhi Makhachkala	2012	2027	412	6
74	Sabuhi Niftiyev	(Azerbaijan)	DF	6 January 2007 (age 19)	Academy	2025		1	0
Midfielders
7	Jaly Mouaddib	(France)	MF	18 November 2000 (age 25)	Omonia Aradippou	2026	2029	18	4
8	Marko Janković	(Montenegro)	MF	9 July 1995 (age 31)	Hapoel Tel Aviv	2022		187	14
10	Joni Montiel	(Spain)	MF	3 September 1998 (age 28)	Rayo Vallecano	2025	2027 (+2)	36	6
11	Reda Khadra	(Lebanon)	MF	4 July 2001 (age 25)	Stade de Reims	2026	2028 (+1)	5	0
20	Kady Borges	(Brazil)	MF	2 May 1996 (age 30)	Ferencváros	2025	2028	146	43
21	Oleksiy Kashchuk	(Ukraine)	MF	29 June 2000 (age 26)	Shakhtar Donetsk	2024	2027	90	17
29	Renaldo Cephas	(Jamaica)	MF	8 December 1999 (age 26)	Nizhny Novgorod	2026	2029	15	4
33	Diego Rosa	(Brazil)	MF	12 October 2002 (age 24)	on loan from APOEL	2026	2027	6	0
35	Pedro Bicalho	(Brazil)	MF	23 April 2001 (age 25)	Palmeiras	2025	2029	66	2
47	Mehdi Mutallimli	(Azerbaijan)	MF	12 December 2007 (age 18)	Academy	2025		1	0
66	Hacy Ibrahim	(Azerbaijan)	MF	25 September 2005 (age 21)	Academy	2025		1	0
76	Nicat Khasiyev	(Azerbaijan)	MF	23 February 2006 (age 20)	Academy	2025		1	0
82	Mahammad Imamaliyev	(Azerbaijan)	MF	23 September 2007 (age 19)	Academy	2025		1	0
88	Samuel Lobato	(Portugal)	MF	19 October 2001 (age 25)	Portimonense	2026	2029	14	0
Forwards
9	Zakaria Sawo	(Sweden)	FW	11 January 2000 (age 26)	Djurgården	2026	2029	9	2
19	Taofeek Ismaheel	(Nigeria)	FW	16 July 2000 (age 26)	Górnik Zabrze	2026	2029	5	0
22	Musa Qurbanlı	(Azerbaijan)	FW	13 April 2002 (age 24)	Djurgarden	2024	2027	142	47
80	Behruz Qurbanli	(Azerbaijan)	FW	6 March 2005 (age 21)	Academy	2025		1	0
Away on loan
Left during the season
10	Abdellah Zoubir	(France)	MF	5 December 1991 (age 34)	RC Lens	2018		369	79
18	Dani Bolt	(Brazil)	DF	18 June 1999 (age 27)	Torreense	2025	2028 (+1)	43	1
99	Mateusz Kochalski	(Poland)	GK	25 July 2000 (age 26)	Stal Mielec	2024	2028	76	0

== Transfers ==
=== In ===
Date	Position	Nationality	Name	From	Fee	Ref.
18 May 2026 (Note: Transfer announced on the shown date, becoming official on 1 June 2026.)	MF	(France)	Jaly Mouaddib	Omonia Aradippou	Undisclosed	
24 May 2026	FW	(Sweden)	Zakaria Sawo	Djurgården	Undisclosed	
16 June 2026	MF	(Portugal)	Samuel Lobato	Portimonense	Undisclosed	
17 June 2026	DF	(Mozambique)	Bruno Langa	UD Almería	Undisclosed	
21 June 2026	GK	(Bosnia and Herzegovina)	Martin Zlomislić	HNK Rijeka	Undisclosed	
25 June 2026	MF	(Jamaica)	Renaldo Cephas	Nizhny Novgorod	Undisclosed	
3 July 2026	DF	(Hungary)	Bence Várkonyi	Zalaegerszegi	Undisclosed	
5 July 2026	DF	(Latvia)	Cebrail Makreckis	Ferencváros	Undisclosed	
27 August 2026	MF	(Lebanon)	Reda Khadra	Stade de Reims	Undisclosed	
27 August 2026	FW	(Nigeria)	Taofeek Ismaheel	Górnik Zabrze	Undisclosed	

=== Loans in ===
Date from	Position	Nationality	Name	From	Date to	Ref.
30 August 2026	MF	(Brazil)	Diego Rosa	APOEL	30 June 2027	

=== Out ===
Date	Position	Nationality	Name	To	Fee	Ref.
27 June 2026	MF	(Cape Verde)	Leandro Andrade	Polissya Zhytomyr	Undisclosed	
10 July 2026	FW	(Colombia)	Camilo Durán	Celtic	Undisclosed	
8 September 2026	GK	(Poland)	Mateusz Kochalski	Wieczysta Kraków	Undisclosed	

=== Released ===
Date	Position	Nationality	Name	Joined	Date	Ref
17 June 2026	DF	(Colombia)	Kevin Medina	Johor Darul		
22 June 2026	GK	(Azerbaijan)	Amin Ramazanov	Sabah	7 July 2026	
22 June 2026	GK	(Croatia)	Fabijan Buntić	Farense		
16 August 2026	MF	(France)	Abdellah Zoubir	Al-Orobah	9 September 2026	
31 August 2026	DF	(Brazil)	Dani Bolt	Johor Darul Ta'zim	31 August 2026	

== Friendlies ==
	–
(UTC+4)

== Competitions ==
=== Overview ===
Competition	First match	Last match	Starting round	Final position	Record							
Competition	First match	Last match	Starting round	Final position	Pld	W	D	L	GF	GA	GD	Win %
Premier League	17 August 2026		Matchday 1		10	5	4	1	14	8	+6	50.00
Azerbaijan Cup	2026		Last 16		0	0	0	0	0	0	+0	—
UEFA Europa League	9 July 2026	30 July 2026	First qualifying round	Second qualifying round	4	2	2	0	6	0	+6	50.00
UEFA Conference League	6 August 2026	27 August 2026	Third qualifying round	Play-off round	4	2	0	2	4	5	−1	50.00
Total					18	9	6	3	24	13	+11	50.00

Last updated: 6 November 2026
Source: Competitions

=== Premier League ===
==== Results summary ====
Overall								Home						Away					
Pld	W	D	L	GF	GA	GD	Pts	W	D	L	GF	GA	GD	W	D	L	GF	GA	GD
10	5	4	1	14	8	+6	19	3	1	1	10	7	+3	2	3	0	4	1	+3

Last updated: 6 November 2026.
Source: See Results

==== Results by round ====
Round	1	3	4	5	6	7	8	9	10	11
Ground	H	A	H	A	H	A	H	A	A	H
Result	W	W	W	D	W	W	D	D	D	L
Position	2	3	3	3	3	3	3	3	3	4

Updated to match(es) played on 6 November 2026. Source: See Results
A = Away; H = Home; W = Win; D = Draw; L = Loss; P = Bye

==== Results ====
17 August 2026 1	Qarabağ	3–1	Şamaxı	Baku
19:30 (UTC+4)	Cephas 28'; Apolinário 59' (o.g.); Kashchuk 85'	Report	Marques (yellow card) 21'; Adilkhanov 43'; Fernandes (yellow card) 45+3'; Pacheco (yellow card) 72'; Moumini (yellow card) 79'	Stadium: Republican Stadium; Attendance: 1,215; Referee: Rəvan Həmzəzadə

31 August 2026 3	Sumgayit	0–1	Qarabağ	Sumgait
20:15 (UTC+4)	Akhmedzade (yellow card) 77'	Report	Lobato (yellow card) 25'; Kady (red card) 31'; Mouaddib 45' (pen.)	Stadium: Kapital Bank Arena; Attendance: 1,350; Referee: Fərid Hacıyev

6 September 2026 4	Qarabağ	3–2	Araz-Naxçıvan	Baku
20:15 (UTC+4)	Montiel 8'; Makreckis (yellow card) 44'; Cephas 67'; Qurbanlı 89'	Report	Muradov (yellow card) 14'; Ahmadzada (yellow card) 44'; Dumančić 72'; Kané (yellow card) 79'; Salyanski 90+3'	Stadium: Republican Stadium; Attendance: 1,100; Referee: Cavid Cəlilov

13 September 2026 5	Zira	1–1	Qarabağ	Zirə
19:00 (UTC+4)	İbrahimli (yellow card) 28'; Djibrilla 55'; Hacılı (yellow card) 85'	Report	Silva (yellow card) 50'; Kashchuk 65'; Várkonyi (yellow card) 70'	Stadium: Zira Olympic Sport Complex Stadium; Attendance: 1,300; Referee: Rəşad Əhmədov

18 September 2026 6	Qarabağ	1–0	Shafa Baku	Baku
19:45 (UTC+4)	Janković 61' (pen.)	Report	Diaw (yellow card) 72'	Stadium: Republican Stadium; Attendance: 1,200; Referee: Vüqar Həsənli

11 October 2026 7	İmişli	0–2	Qarabağ	Yevlakh
16:00 (UTC+4)	Hasanalizade (yellow card) 84'	Report	Montiel (yellow card) 15'; Kashchuk 59'; Mouaddib 88'; Khadra (yellow card) 90+2'	Stadium: City Stadium; Attendance: 3,000; Referee: Elvin Bayramov

17 October 2026 8	Qarabağ	3–3	Neftçi	Baku
19:00 (UTC+4)	Kashchuk 18'; Cephas 88'; Kady 90+4'	Report	Klismahn 11', 33' (yellow card) 77'; Tupta (yellow card) 41'; Savić 52'; Safarov (yellow card) 90+4'} Sacko (yellow card) FT; Ribeiro (yellow card) FT	Stadium: Republican Stadium; Attendance: 13,500; Referee: Kamal Umudlu

25 October 2026 9	Sabah	0–0	Qarabağ	Baku
18:00 AZT (UTC+4)	Du Queiroz (yellow card) 85'; Nwachukwu (yellow card) 88'	Report	Janković (yellow card) 19'; Kashchuk (yellow card) 71'	Stadium: Dalga Arena; Attendance: 5,180; Referee: Rəşad Əhmədov

31 October 2026 10	Qabala	0–0	Qarabağ	Qabala
17:30 (UTC+4)	Amoah (yellow card) 14'; Eduardo (yellow card) 45'	Report	Rosa (yellow card) 68'	Stadium: City Stadium; Attendance: 1,500; Referee: Rəvan Həmzəzadə

6 November 2026 11	Qarabağ	0–1	Turan Tovuz	Baku
18:00 (UTC+4)		Report	Wadji (yellow card) 72'; Miller 80'	Stadium: Tofiq Bahramov Republican Stadium; Attendance: 1,536; Referee: Fərid Hacıyev

22 November 2026 12	Kapaz	–	Qarabağ	Ganja
17:00 (UTC+4)		Report		Stadium: City Stadium

17 December 2026 2	Qarabağ	–	Kapaz	Baku
18:30 (UTC+4)				Stadium: Republican Stadium
Note: Initially scheduled for weekend of 21-24 August 2026.

==== League table ====
Pos	Team	Pld	W	D	L	GF	GA	GD	Pts	Qualification or relegation
2	Sabah	10	6	3	1	22	6	+16	21	Qualification for the Conference League second qualifying round (Note: The 2026–27 Azerbaijan Cup winner will qualify for the Europa League first qualifying round. If the cup winner finishes in the top three, the second Conference League berth will be passed to the fourth place team.)
3	Turan Tovuz	11	6	3	2	12	8	+4	21	Qualification for the Conference League second qualifying round
4	Qarabağ	10	5	4	1	14	8	+6	19	
5	Zira	11	5	4	2	16	15	+1	19	
6	Kapaz	10	5	2	3	10	10	0	17	

Updated to match(es) played on 8 November 2026. Source: Soccerway
Rules for classification: 1) Points; 2) Matches won; 3) Goal difference; 4) Goals scored; 5) Head-to-head points; 6) Head-to-head goal difference; 7) Lower number of points based on yellow and red cards; 8) Draw.

=== Azerbaijan Cup ===
2027 Last 16	Sumgayit	–	Qarabağ	Sumgait
AZT (UTC+4)				Stadium: City Stadium

=== UEFA Europa League ===
==== Qualifying rounds ====
9 July 2026 First qualifying round 1st leg	Qarabağ (Azerbaijan)	3–0	(Iceland) Vestri	Baku, Azerbaijan
20:00 (UTC+4)	Sawo 30'; Zoubir 45+2'; Cephas 86'	Report	Fall (yellow card) 2'	Stadium: Tofiq Bahramov Republican Stadium; Attendance: 23,549; Referee: Roman Jitari (Moldova)

17 July 2026 First qualifying round 2nd leg	Vestri (Iceland)	0–3 (0–6 agg.)	(Azerbaijan) Qarabağ	Reykjavík, Iceland
00:00 (UTC+4)		Report	Bouaddib 5'; Bicalho 29'; Sawo 57'	Stadium: Valbjarnarvöllur; Attendance: 474; Referee: Marek Radina (Czech Republic)
Note: Vestri played their home match at Valbjarnarvöllur in Reykjavík instead of their regular stadium, Torfnesvöllur in Ísafjörður, which does not fulfill UEFA requirements.

23 July 2026 Second qualifying round 1st leg	Qarabağ (Azerbaijan)	0–0	(Bulgaria) CSKA Sofia	Baku, Azerbaijan
20:00 (UTC+4)	Janković (yellow card) 37'	Report	Godoy (yellow card) 35'; Rodríguez (yellow card) 77'	Stadium: Tofiq Bahramov Republican Stadium; Attendance: 23,813; Referee: Daniele Chiffi (Italy)

30 July 2026 Second qualifying round 2nd leg	CSKA Sofia (Bulgaria)	0–0 (0–0 agg.) (5–4 p)	(Azerbaijan) Qarabağ	Sofia, Bulgaria
22:00 (UTC+4)	Jordão (yellow card) 39'; Godoy (yellow card) 48'; Eto'o (yellow card) 74'; Martino (yellow card) 95'; Ivanov (yellow card) 105+3'; Zwarts (yellow card) 112'	Report	Janković (yellow card) 50'; Várkonyi (yellow card) 55'; Langa (yellow card) 106'	Stadium: Vasil Levski National Stadium; Attendance: 16,172; Referee: Bram Van Driessche (Belgium)
	Penalties
	Pittas (penalty scored); Ivanov (penalty scored); Gbamin (penalty scored); Sensi (penalty scored); Eto'o (penalty scored)		(penalty scored) Janković; (penalty missed) Silva; (penalty scored) Mouaddib; (penalty scored) Cephas; (penalty scored) Montiel

=== UEFA Conference League ===
==== Qualifying rounds ====
6 August 2026 Third qualifying round 1st leg	Dynamo Kyiv (Ukraine)	1–0	(Azerbaijan) Qarabağ	Lublin, Poland
21:00 (UTC+4)	Ponomarenko 10'; Dubinchak (yellow card) 14'; Kędziora (yellow card) 81'; Shaparenko (yellow card) 90+5'	Report	Makreckis (red card) 90+1'; Silva (yellow card) 90+4'	Stadium: Arena Lublin; Attendance: 4,335; Referee: Morten Krogh (Denmark)
Note: Due to the Russian invasion of Ukraine, Ukrainian teams were required to play their home matches at neutral venues until further notice.

13 August 2026 Third qualifying round 2nd leg	Qarabağ (Azerbaijan)	2–0 (2–1 agg.)	(Ukraine) Dynamo Kyiv	Baku, Azerbaijan
20:00 (UTC+4)	Mouaddib 12'; Guseynov (yellow card) 62'; Kashchuk 69'	Report	Dubinchak (yellow card) 29'; Ponomarenko (yellow card) 45+4'	Stadium: Tofiq Bahramov Republican Stadium; Attendance: 26,449; Referee: Stuart Attwell (England)

20 August 2026 Play-off round 1st leg	Twente (Netherlands)	0–1	(Azerbaijan) Qarabağ	Enschede, Netherlands
22:00 (UTC+4)	Pröpper (yellow card) 23'; Adelgaard (yellow card) 28'; Weidmann (yellow card) 34'; Zerrouki (yellow card) 58'; Rots (yellow card) 66'	Report	Silva (yellow card) 28'; Kady 52'	Stadium: De Grolsch Veste; Attendance: 25,250; Referee: Juxhin Xhaja (Albania)

27 August 2026 Play-off round 2nd leg	Qarabağ (Azerbaijan)	1–4 (2–4 agg.)	(Netherlands) Twente	Baku, Azerbaijan
20:00 (UTC+4)	Langa (yellow card) 23'; Lobato (yellow card) 58'; Kady 59'; Várkonyi (yellow card) 90+4'; Mouaddib (yellow card) 92'; Janković (yellow card) 90' (red card) 106'	Report	Zerrouki (yellow card) 22'; Pjaca 79'; Bruns 90+2'; Weghorst 94' (yellow card) 106'; Taha 114' (yellow card) 116'	Stadium: Tofiq Bahramov Republican Stadium; Attendance: 28,869; Referee: Rohit Saggi (Norway)

== Squad statistics ==
As of match played 6 November 2026

=== Appearances and goals ===
No.	Pos	Nat	Player	Total		Premier League		Azerbaijan Cup		Europa League		Conference League	
No.	Pos	Nat	Player	Apps	Goals	Apps	Goals	Apps	Goals	Apps	Goals	Apps	Goals
1	GK	(Azerbaijan) AZE	Shakhruddin Magomedaliyev	4	0	4	0	0	0	0	0	0	0
2	DF	(Brazil) BRA	Matheus Silva	18	0	9+1	0	0	0	4	0	4	0
4	DF	(Hungary) HUN	Bence Várkonyi	18	0	10	0	0	0	4	0	4	0
5	DF	(Mozambique) MOZ	Bruno Langa	18	0	10	0	0	0	3+1	0	2+2	0
7	MF	(France) FRA	Jaly Mouaddib	18	4	8+2	2	0	0	1+3	1	4	1
8	MF	(Montenegro) MNE	Marko Janković	17	1	6+3	1	0	0	4	0	4	0
9	FW	(Sweden) SWE	Zakaria Sawo	9	2	4+1	0	0	0	4	2	0	0
10	MF	(Spain) ESP	Joni Montiel	11	1	5+1	1	0	0	0+2	0	0+3	0
11	MF	(Germany) GER	Reda Khadra	5	0	1+4	0	0	0	0	0	0	0
13	DF	(Azerbaijan) AZE	Behlul Mustafazade	2	0	0+1	0	0	0	0	0	0+1	0
19	FW	(Nigeria) NGR	Taofeek Ismaheel	5	0	2+3	0	0	0	0	0	0	0
20	MF	(Brazil) BRA	Kady Borges	15	3	6+1	1	0	0	4	0	3+1	2
21	MF	(Ukraine) UKR	Oleksiy Kashchuk	18	5	6+4	4	0	0	3+1	0	4	1
22	FW	(Azerbaijan) AZE	Musa Qurbanlı	14	1	4+5	1	0	0	0+1	0	2+2	0
23	GK	(Bosnia and Herzegovina) BIH	Martin Zlomislić	7	0	4	0	0	0	0	0	3	0
25	DF	(Latvia) LAT	Cebrail Makreckis	14	0	9	0	0	0	0+3	0	1+1	0
29	MF	(Jamaica) JAM	Renaldo Cephas	15	4	6+3	3	0	0	0+4	1	1+1	0
32	DF	(Azerbaijan) AZE	Hikmat Jabrayilzade	1	0	0	0	0	0	0	0	0+1	0
33	MF	(Brazil) BRA	Diego Rosa	6	0	5+1	0	0	0	0	0	0	0
35	MF	(Brazil) BRA	Pedro Bicalho	15	1	4+4	0	0	0	4	1	2+1	0
44	DF	(Azerbaijan) AZE	Elvin Cafarguliyev	6	0	0	0	0	0	1+3	0	2	0
55	DF	(Azerbaijan) AZE	Badavi Guseynov	12	0	2+3	0	0	0	4	0	3	0
88	MF	(Portugal) POR	Samuel Lobato	14	0	3+5	0	0	0	0+2	0	2+2	0
Players away on loan:
Players who left Qarabağ during the season:
10	MF	(France) FRA	Abdellah Zoubir	6	1	0	0	0	0	4	1	2	0
18	DF	(Brazil) BRA	Dani Bolt	3	0	0	0	0	0	0+1	0	0+2	0
99	GK	(Poland) POL	Mateusz Kochalski	7	0	2	0	0	0	4	0	1	0

=== Goal scorers ===
Place	Position	Nation	Number	Name	Premier League	Azerbaijan Cup	Europa League	Conference League	Total
1	MF	(Ukraine)	21	Oleksiy Kashchuk	4	0	0	1	5
2	MF	(Jamaica)	29	Renaldo Cephas	3	0	1	0	4
2	MF	(France)	7	Jaly Mouaddib	2	0	1	1	4
4	MF	(Brazil)	20	Kady Borges	1	0	0	2	3
5	FW	(Sweden)	11	Zakaria Sawo	0	0	2	0	2
6	MF	(Spain)	10	Joni Montiel	1	0	0	0	1
6	FW	(Azerbaijan)	22	Musa Qurbanlı	1	0	0	0	1
6	MF	(Montenegro)	8	Marko Janković	1	0	0	0	1
6	MF	(France)	10	Abdellah Zoubir	0	0	1	0	1
6	MF	(Brazil)	35	Pedro Bicalho	0	0	1	0	1
6				Own goal	1	0	0	0	1
				TOTALS	14	0	6	4	24

=== Clean sheets ===
Place	Position	Nation	Number	Name	Premier League	Azerbaijan Cup	Europa League	Conference League	Total
1	GK	(Poland)	99	Mateusz Kochalski	1	0	4	0	5
2	GK	(Bosnia and Herzegovina)	23	Martin Zlomislić	2	0	0	2	4
3	GK	(Azerbaijan)	1	Shakhruddin Magomedaliyev	2	0	0	0	2
				TOTALS	5	0	4	2	11

=== Disciplinary record ===
Number	Nation	Position	Name	Premier League		Azerbaijan Cup		Europa League		Conference League		Total	
Number	Nation	Position	Name	Yellow card	Red card	Yellow card	Red card	Yellow card	Red card	Yellow card	Red card	Yellow card	Red card
2	(Brazil)	DF	Matheus Silva	1	0	0	0	0	0	2	0	3	0
4	(Hungary)	DF	Bence Várkonyi	1	0	0	0	1	0	1	0	3	0
5	(Mozambique)	DF	Bruno Langa	0	0	0	0	1	0	1	0	2	0
7	(France)	MF	Jaly Mouaddib	0	0	0	0	0	0	1	0	1	0
8	(Montenegro)	MF	Marko Janković	1	0	0	0	2	0	1	1	4	1
10	(Spain)	MF	Joni Montiel	1	0	0	0	0	0	0	0	1	0
11	(Lebanon)	MF	Reda Khadra	1	0	0	0	0	0	0	0	1	0
20	(Brazil)	MF	Kady Borges	0	1	0	0	0	0	0	0	0	1
21	(Ukraine)	MF	Oleksiy Kashchuk	1	0	0	0	0	0	0	0	1	0
25	(Latvia)	DF	Cebrail Makreckis	1	0	0	0	0	0	0	1	1	1
33	(Brazil)	MF	Diego Rosa	1	0	0	0	0	0	0	0	1	0
55	(Azerbaijan)	DF	Badavi Guseynov	0	0	0	0	0	0	1	0	1	0
88	(Portugal)	MF	Samuel Lobato	1	0	0	0	0	0	1	0	2	0
Players away on loan:
Players who left Qarabağ during the season:
			TOTALS	9	1	0	0	3	0	8	2	20	3
