= 2026–27 UEFA Europa League qualifying =

Football tournament qualification stage

The 2026–27 UEFA Europa League qualifying phase and play-off round began on 9 July and ended on 27 August 2026.

A total of 52 teams competed in the qualifying system, which included the qualifying phase and the play-off round. The 12 winners of the play-off round advanced to the league phase, where they joined the 13 teams that had entered directly in the league phase, along with the seven losers of the Champions League play-off round – five from the Champions Path and two from the League Path – and the four losers of the Champions League third qualifying round from the League Path.

Times are CEST (UTC+2), as listed by UEFA (local times, if different, are in parentheses).

== Format ==
The qualifying phase was split into two paths – the Champions Path and the Main Path. The Champions Path contained teams that were eliminated from the Champions League Champions Path, and the Main Path contained teams that qualified as third-placed or fourth-placed team from their domestic league or as domestic cup winners. The paths were merged in the play-off round.

Each tie was played over two legs, with each team playing one leg at home. The team that scored more goals on aggregate over the two legs advanced to the next round. If the aggregate score was level at the end of normal time of the second leg, extra time was played, and if the same number of goals was scored by both teams during extra time, the tie was decided by a penalty shoot-out.

In the draws for each round, teams were seeded based on their UEFA club coefficients at the beginning of the season, with the teams divided into seeded and unseeded pots containing the same number of teams. A seeded team was drawn against an unseeded team, with the order of legs in each tie decided by draw. As the identity of the winners of the previous round may not have been known at the time of the draws, the seeding was carried out under the assumption that the team with the higher coefficient of an undecided tie advanced to the subsequent round. In practice, this meant if the team with the lower coefficient advanced in the Europa League or the team with the higher coefficient was eliminated from the Champions League, it simply took the seeding of its opponent.

Prior to the draws, UEFA could form "groups" in accordance with the principles set by the Club Competitions Committee, purely for the convenience of the draw and not to resemble any real groupings in the sense of the competition. Teams from associations with political conflicts as decided by UEFA could not be drawn into the same tie. After the draws, the order of legs of a tie could be reversed by UEFA due to scheduling or venue conflicts.

== Schedule ==
The schedule of the competition was as follows. Matches were scheduled for Thursdays, though exceptionally could take place on Tuesdays or Wednesdays due to scheduling conflicts.

Schedule for 2026–27 UEFA Europa League
Round	Draw date	First leg	Second leg
First qualifying round	16 June 2026	9 July 2026	16 July 2026
Second qualifying round	17 June 2026	23 July 2026	30 July 2026
Third qualifying round	20 July 2026	6 August 2026	13 August 2026
Play-off round	3 August 2026	20 August 2026	27 August 2026

== Teams ==
In the qualifying stage, the teams were divided into two paths:

- Champions Path (12 teams):
  - Third qualifying round: 12 losers of the Champions League Champions Path second qualifying round.
- Main Path:
  - First qualifying round (12 teams): 12 teams which entered in this round.
  - Second qualifying round (18 teams): 12 teams which entered in this round, and 6 winners of the first qualifying round.
  - Third qualifying round (14 teams): 3 teams which entered in this round, 2 losers of the Champions League League Path second qualifying round, and 9 winners of the second qualifying round.

The winners of the third qualifying round were combined into a single path for the play-off round:

- Play-off round (24 teams): 5 teams which entered this round, 6 losers of the Champions League Champions Path third qualifying round, 6 winners of the Champions Path third qualifying round, and 7 winners of the Main Path third qualifying round.

All teams eliminated from the qualifying phase and play-off round entered the Conference League:

- The 6 losers of the Main Path first qualifying round entered the Main Path second qualifying round.
- The 9 losers of the Main Path second qualifying round entered the Main Path third qualifying round.
- The 6 losers of the Champions Path third qualifying round entered the Champions Path play-off round.
- The 7 losers of the Main Path third qualifying round entered the Main Path play-off round.
- The 12 losers of the play-off round entered the league phase.

Below were the participating teams (with their 2026 UEFA club coefficients, not used as seeding for the Champions Path, however), grouped by their starting rounds.

Key to colours
Winners of play-off round advanced to league phase
Losers of play-off round entered Conference League league phase
Losers of third qualifying round entered Conference League play-off round
Losers of second qualifying round entered Conference League third qualifying round
Losers of first qualifying round entered Conference League second qualifying round

Play-off round
Team	Coeff.
(Czech Republic) Viktoria Plzeň	50.500
(Serbia) Red Star Belgrade	46.500
(Belgium) Sint-Truiden	12.450
(Kazakhstan) Kairat	11.000
(Turkey) Trabzonspor	11.000
(Greece) OFI	9.682
(Denmark) AGF	8.421
(Norway) Lillestrøm	8.247
Ararat-Armenia	7.000
(Lithuania) Kauno Žalgiris	6.000
(Sweden) Mjällby AIF	5.925

Third qualifying round (Champions Path)
Team	Coeff.
(Poland) Lech Poznań	27.250
(Cyprus) Omonia	21.250
(Republic of Ireland) Shamrock Rovers	19.375
(Finland) KuPS	14.000
(Gibraltar) Lincoln Red Imps	13.500
(Iceland) Víkingur Reykjavík	11.750
(Romania) Universitatea Craiova	10.500
(Faroe Islands) KÍ	10.500
(Northern Ireland) Larne	9.000
(Switzerland) Thun	6.940
(Georgia (country)) Iberia 1999	5.000
(Albania) Egnatia	4.500

Third qualifying round (Main Path)
Team	Coeff.
(Scotland) Rangers	59.250
(Austria) Red Bull Salzburg	45.000
(Poland) Jagiellonia Białystok	22.000
(Scotland) Heart of Midlothian	11.500
(Poland) Górnik Zabrze	9.350

Second qualifying round
Team	Coeff.
(Portugal) Benfica	90.000
(Denmark) Midtjylland	48.250
(Greece) PAOK	48.250
(Israel) Maccabi Tel Aviv	32.500
(Belgium) Anderlecht	30.750
(Cyprus) Pafos	24.125
(Turkey) Beşiktaş	15.500
(Netherlands) Twente	13.585
(Czech Republic) Hradec Králové	9.705
(Norway) Tromsø	8.247
(Switzerland) St. Gallen	6.940
(Sweden) Hammarby IF	6.000

First qualifying round
Team	Coeff.
(Hungary) Ferencváros	51.250
(Azerbaijan) Qarabağ	42.750
(Moldova) Sheriff Tiraspol	20.000
(Ukraine) Dynamo Kyiv	17.500
(Croatia) Hajduk Split	10.000
(Bulgaria) CSKA Sofia	6.500
(Slovakia) Žilina	5.500
(Serbia) Vojvodina	5.500
(Romania) Universitatea Cluj	5.050
(Slovenia) Aluminij	4.893
(Republic of Ireland) Derry City	4.000
(Iceland) Vestri	3.304

Notes

1. ^{CH Q3} Losers of Champions League third qualifying round (Champions Path).
2. ^{CH Q2} Losers of Champions League second qualifying round (Champions Path).
3. ^{LP Q2} Losers of Champions League second qualifying round (League Path).

== First qualifying round ==
The draw for the first qualifying round was held on 16 June 2026.

=== Seeding ===
A total of 12 teams played in the first qualifying round. Seeding of the teams was based on their 2026 UEFA club coefficients. The teams were divided into seeded and unseeded pots. The first team drawn in each tie was designated as the home team for the first leg.

Seeded	Unseeded
(Hungary) Ferencváros; (Azerbaijan) Qarabağ; (Moldova) Sheriff Tiraspol; (Ukraine) Dynamo Kyiv; (Croatia) Hajduk Split; (Bulgaria) CSKA Sofia	(Slovakia) Žilina; (Serbia) Vojvodina; (Romania) Universitatea Cluj; (Slovenia) Aluminij; (Republic of Ireland) Derry City; (Iceland) Vestri

=== Summary ===
The first legs were played on 9 July, and the second legs were played on 16 July 2026.

The winners of the ties advanced to the second qualifying round. The losers were transferred to the Conference League Main Path second qualifying round.

First qualifying round
Team 1	Agg.	Team 2	1st leg	2nd leg
Dynamo Kyiv (Ukraine)	0–0 (4–2 p)	(Romania) Universitatea Cluj	0–0	0–0 (a.e.t.)
Qarabağ (Azerbaijan)	6–0	(Iceland) Vestri	3–0	3–0
Hajduk Split (Croatia)	3–2	(Slovakia) Žilina	2–0	1–2
CSKA Sofia (Bulgaria)	5–3	(Republic of Ireland) Derry City	3–2	2–1
Sheriff Tiraspol (Moldova)	1–0	(Slovenia) Aluminij	0–0	1–0
Vojvodina (Serbia)	1–5	(Hungary) Ferencváros	1–2	0–3

=== Matches ===
9 July 2026
19:00

Dynamo Kyiv (Ukraine)	0–0	(Romania) Universitatea Cluj
	Report

Arena Lublin, Lublin, Poland (Note: Due to the Russian invasion of Ukraine, Ukrainian teams were required to play their home matches at neutral venues until further notice.)
Attendance: 1,795
Referee: Joonas Jaanovits (Estonia)
16 July 2026
19:30 (20:30 UTC+3)

Universitatea Cluj (Romania)	0–0 (a.e.t.)	(Ukraine) Dynamo Kyiv
	Report
Penalties
Nistor (penalty scored); Codrea (penalty missed); Chipciu (penalty missed); Bic (penalty scored)	2–4	(penalty scored) Yarmolenko; (penalty scored) Brazhko; (penalty scored) Ponomarenko; (penalty scored) Lonwijk

Cluj Arena, Cluj-Napoca
Attendance: 20,043
Referee: Iwan Griffith (Wales)

0–0 on aggregate; Dynamo Kyiv won 4–2 on penalties.

9 July 2026
18:00 (20:00 UTC+4)

Qarabağ (Azerbaijan)	3–0	(Iceland) Vestri
Sawo 30'; Zoubir 45+2'; Cephas 86'	Report

Tofiq Bahramov Republican Stadium, Baku
Attendance: 23,549
Referee: Roman Jitari (Moldova)
16 July 2026
22:00 (20:00 UTC)

Vestri (Iceland)	0–3	(Azerbaijan) Qarabağ
	Report	Bouaddib 5'; Bicalho 29'; Sawo 57'

Valbjarnarvöllur, Reykjavík (Note: Vestri played their home match at Valbjarnarvöllur in Reykjavík instead of their regular stadium, Torfnesvöllur in Ísafjörður, which did not fulfill UEFA requirements.)
Attendance: 474
Referee: Marek Radina (Czech Republic)

Qarabağ won 6–0 on aggregate.

9 July 2026
20:00

Hajduk Split (Croatia)	2–0	(Slovakia) Žilina
Brajković 22'; Dalisson 49'	Report

Stadion Poljud, Split
Attendance: 22,352
Referee: Kyriakos Athanasiou (Cyprus)
16 July 2026
20:30

Žilina (Slovakia)	2–1	(Croatia) Hajduk Split
Roginić 51'; Melnjak 90+1' (o.g.)	Report	Van Hoorenbeeck 45+2'

Štadión pod Dubňom, Žilina
Attendance: 7,823
Referee: Horațiu Mircea Feșnic (Romania)

Hajduk Split won 3–2 on aggregate.

9 July 2026
20:00 (21:00 UTC+3)

CSKA Sofia (Bulgaria)	3–2	(Republic of Ireland) Derry City
Pittas 20', 53'; Jordão 42'	Report	Boyce 31'; Olayinka 89'

Vasil Levski National Stadium, Sofia
Attendance: 12,713
Referee: Visar Kastrati (Kosovo)
16 July 2026
19:30 (18:30 UTC+1)

Derry City (Republic of Ireland)	1–2	(Bulgaria) CSKA Sofia
Chapman 47'	Report	Pittas 76'; Cotter 90+18' (o.g.)

Ryan McBride Brandywell Stadium, Derry
Attendance: 4,155
Referee: Jasmin Sabotic (Luxembourg)

CSKA Sofia won 5–3 on aggregate.

9 July 2026
19:00 (20:00 UTC+3)

Sheriff Tiraspol (Moldova)	0–0	(Slovenia) Aluminij
	Report

Sheriff Arena, Tiraspol
Attendance: 5,634
Referee: Arnes Talic (Austria)
16 July 2026
20:00

Aluminij (Slovenia)	0–1	(Moldova) Sheriff Tiraspol
	Report	Loukou 5'

Ljudski vrt, Maribor (Note: Aluminij played their home match at Ljudski Vrt in Maribor instead of their regular stadium, Aluminij Sports Park in Kidričevo, which did not fulfill UEFA requirements.)
Attendance: 2,000
Referee: Anojen Kanagasingam (Switzerland)

Sheriff Tiraspol won 1–0 on aggregate.

9 July 2026
20:00

Vojvodina (Serbia)	1–2	(Hungary) Ferencváros
Raemaekers 45+1' (o.g.)	Report	Zachariassen 8'; Dele 86'

Karađorđe Stadium, Novi Sad
Attendance: 6,557
Referee: Mathieu Vernice (France)
16 July 2026
20:15

Ferencváros (Hungary)	3–0	(Serbia) Vojvodina
Joseph 27'; Zachariassen 34'; Gruber 71'	Report

Ferencváros Stadion, Budapest
Attendance: 13,901
Referee: Vitālijs Spasjoņņikovs (Latvia)

Ferencváros won 5–1 on aggregate.

== Second qualifying round ==
The draw for the second qualifying round was held on 17 June 2026.

=== Seeding ===
A total of 18 teams played in the second qualifying round: 12 teams which entered in this round, and the six winners of the first qualifying round. Seeding of the teams was based on their 2026 UEFA club coefficients. For the winners of first qualifying round ties, whose identity was not known at the time of the draw, the coefficient of the team with the higher coefficient in each tie was used. Prior to the draw, UEFA divided the teams into two groups of seeded and unseeded teams, in accordance with the principles set by the Club Competitions Committee. The team or pairing represented by the ball drawn first was designated as the home team for the first leg.

Group 1		Group 2	
Seeded	Unseeded	Seeded	Unseeded
(Hungary) Ferencváros; (Czech Republic) Hradec Králové; (Denmark) Midtjylland; (Azerbaijan) Qarabağ; (Belgium) Anderlecht	(Turkey) Beşiktaş; (Netherlands) Twente; (Norway) Tromsø; (Bulgaria) CSKA Sofia; (Sweden) Hammarby IF	(Portugal) Benfica; (Greece) PAOK; (Israel) Maccabi Tel Aviv; (Cyprus) Pafos	(Moldova) Sheriff Tiraspol; (Ukraine) Dynamo Kyiv; (Croatia) Hadjuk Split; (Switzerland) St. Gallen

Notes

1. ^{†} Winners of the first qualifying round, whose identity was not known at the time of draw.
2. ^{‡} Following the exclusion of Karviná and the subsequent adjustment of the Czech clubs' access places, Hradec Králové replaced Viktoria Plzeň in the UEFA Europa League second qualifying round. Hradec Králové therefore effectively inherited the seeded status associated with Viktoria Plzeň's place in the draw.

=== Summary ===
The first legs were played on 23 July, and the second legs were played on 30 July 2026.

The winners of the ties advanced to the Main Path third qualifying round. The losers were transferred to the Conference League Main Path third qualifying round.

Second qualifying round
Team 1	Agg.	Team 2	1st leg	2nd leg
Hammarby IF (Sweden)	2–4	(Belgium) Anderlecht	1–1	1–3
Qarabağ (Azerbaijan)	0–0 (4–5 p)	(Bulgaria) CSKA Sofia	0–0	0–0 (a.e.t.)
Tromsø (Norway)	1–4	(Czech Republic) Hradec Králové	0–1	1–3
Twente (Netherlands)	3–4	(Hungary) Ferencváros	1–2	2–2
Beşiktaş (Turkey)	3–0	(Denmark) Midtjylland	1–0	2–0
Hajduk Split (Croatia)	2–4	(Cyprus) Pafos	2–0	0–4 (a.e.t.)
Sheriff Tiraspol (Moldova)	0–6	(Israel) Maccabi Tel Aviv	0–5	0–1
St. Gallen (Switzerland)	2–6	(Portugal) Benfica	2–1	0–5
Dynamo Kyiv (Ukraine)	2–5	(Greece) PAOK	2–3	0–2

=== Matches ===
23 July 2026
19:00

Hammarby IF (Sweden)	1–1	(Belgium) Anderlecht
Adjei 89'	Report	Sikan 6'

3Arena, Stockholm
Attendance: 23,572
Referee: Don Robertson (Scotland)
30 July 2026
20:30

Anderlecht (Belgium)	3–1	(Sweden) Hammarby IF
Sikan 47'; Cvetković 81'; Degreef 89'	Report	Abraham 2'

Constant Vanden Stock Stadium, Brussels
Attendance: 18,095
Referee: Danilo Nikolić (Serbia)

Anderlecht won 4–2 on aggregate.

23 July 2026
18:00 (20:00 UTC+4)

Qarabağ (Azerbaijan)	0–0	(Bulgaria) CSKA Sofia
	Report

Tofiq Bahramov Republican Stadium, Baku
Attendance: 23,813
Referee: Daniele Chiffi (Italy)
30 July 2026
20:00 (21:00 UTC+3)

CSKA Sofia (Bulgaria)	0–0 (a.e.t.)	(Azerbaijan) Qarabağ
	Report
Penalties
Pittas (penalty scored); T. Ivanov (penalty scored); Gbamin (penalty scored); Sensi (penalty scored); Eto'o (penalty scored)	5–4	(penalty scored) Janković; (penalty missed) Silva; (penalty scored) Mouaddib; (penalty scored) Cephas; (penalty scored) Montiel

Vasil Levski National Stadium, Sofia
Attendance: 16,172
Referee: Bram Van Driessche (Belgium)

0–0 on aggregate; CSKA Sofia won 5–4 on penalties.

23 July 2026
19:00

Tromsø (Norway)	0–1	(Czech Republic) Hradec Králové
	Report	Van Buren 85'

Romssa Arena, Tromsø
Attendance: 5,082
Referee: Snir Levy (Israel)
30 July 2026
19:00

Hradec Králové (Czech Republic)	3–1	(Norway) Tromsø
Van Buren 30'; Slončík 48'; Mihálik 53'	Report	H. Larsen 25'

Malšovická aréna, Hradec Králové
Attendance: 9,300
Referee: Nikola Dabanović (Montenegro)

Hradec Králové won 4–1 on aggregate.

23 July 2026
20:00

Twente (Netherlands)	1–2	(Hungary) Ferencváros
Adelgaard 38'	Report	Joseph 14', 80'

De Grolsch Veste, Enschede
Attendance: 27,500
Referee: Damian Kos (Poland)
30 July 2026
20:30

Ferencváros (Hungary)	2–2	(Netherlands) Twente
Raemaekers 22' (pen.); Joseph 50'	Report	Weghorst 83'; Vennegoor of Hesselink 86'

Ferencváros Stadion, Budapest
Attendance: 17,201
Referee: Viktor Kopiievskyi (Ukraine)

Ferencváros won 4–3 on aggregate.

23 July 2026
20:00 (21:00 UTC+3)

Beşiktaş (Turkey)	1–0	(Denmark) Midtjylland
Kökçü 26'	Report

Beşiktaş Stadium, Istanbul
Attendance: 31,471
Referee: Ricardo de Burgos Bengoetxea (Spain)
30 July 2026
19:00

Midtjylland (Denmark)	0–2	(Turkey) Beşiktaş
	Report	Rashica 70'; Kökçü 76' (pen.)

MCH Arena, Herning
Attendance: 10,227
Referee: Ante Čulina (Croatia)

Beşiktaş won 3–0 on aggregate.

23 July 2026
21:00

Hajduk Split (Croatia)	2–0	(Cyprus) Pafos
Šego 56'; Melnjak 64'	Report

Stadion Poljud, Split
Attendance: 27,752
Referee: Rob Harvey (Republic of Ireland)
30 July 2026
19:00 (20:00 UTC+3)

Pafos (Cyprus)	4–0 (a.e.t.)	(Croatia) Hajduk Split
Guga 40'; Goldar 90+1'; Teixeira 93'; Correia 117'	Report

Alphamega Stadium, Limassol (Note: Pafos played their home matches at the Alphamega Stadium in Limassol, instead of their regular stadium, the Stelios Kyriakides Stadium, in Paphos, which did not meet UEFA requirements.)
Attendance: 4,169
Referee: Paweł Raczkowski (Poland)

Pafos won 4–2 on aggregate.

23 July 2026
19:00 (20:00 UTC+3)

Sheriff Tiraspol (Moldova)	0–5	(Israel) Maccabi Tel Aviv
	Report	Abu Farchi 5', 74' (pen.); Do. Peretz 29'; Jehezkel 53'; Sissokho 78'

Sheriff Arena, Tiraspol
Attendance: 7,157
Referee: Kyriakos Athanasiou (Cyprus)
30 July 2026
18:00 (20:00 UTC+4)

Maccabi Tel Aviv (Israel)	1–0	(Moldova) Sheriff Tiraspol
Koné 29' (o.g.)	Report

Adjarabet Arena, Batumi, Georgia (Note: Due to the Gaza war, Israeli teams were required to play their home matches at neutral venues until further notice.)
Attendance: 1,012
Referee: Mikkel Redder (Denmark)

Maccabi Tel Aviv won 6–0 on aggregate.

23 July 2026
20:00

St. Gallen (Switzerland)	2–1	(Portugal) Benfica
Baldé 37'; Gaal 80'	Report	R. Silva 44'

Sitterstadion, St. Gallen
Attendance: 17,179
Referee: Luca Pairetto (Italy)
30 July 2026
21:00 (20:00 UTC+1)

Benfica (Portugal)	5–0	(Switzerland) St. Gallen
Pavlidis 11', 55', 65', 74' (pen.); Lenglet 82'	Report

Estádio da Luz, Lisbon
Attendance: 59,563
Referee: Florian Badstübner (Germany)

Benfica won 6–2 on aggregate.

23 July 2026
19:00

Dynamo Kyiv (Ukraine)	2–3	(Greece) PAOK
Brazhko 3'; Lonwijk 77'	Report	Konstantelias 13'; Zafeiris 38'; Santamaria 51'

Arena Lublin, Lublin, Poland
Attendance: 3,225
Referee: Sandi Putros (Denmark)
30 July 2026
19:45 (20:45 UTC+3)

PAOK (Greece)	2–0	(Ukraine) Dynamo Kyiv
Konstantelias 45+1', 48'	Report

Toumba Stadium, Thessaloniki
Attendance: 18,760
Referee: Damian Sylwestrzak (Poland)

PAOK won 5–2 on aggregate.

== Third qualifying round ==
The draw for the third qualifying round was held on 20 July 2026.

=== Seeding ===
A total of 26 teams played in the third qualifying round. Seeding of the teams was based on their 2026 UEFA club coefficients. Before the draw, UEFA formed groups of seeded and unseeded teams per the principles set by the Club Competitions Committee. The first team drawn in each tie was designated as the home team for the first leg.

Champions Path
Group 1		Group 2	
Seeded	Unseeded	Seeded	Unseeded
(Cyprus) Omonia; (Northern Ireland) Larne; (Romania) Universitatea Craiova	(Finland) KuPS; (Gibraltar) Lincoln Red Imps; (Georgia (country)) Iberia 1999	(Iceland) Víkingur Reykjavík; (Poland) Lech Poznań; (Republic of Ireland) Shamrock Rovers	(Switzerland) Thun; (Faroe Islands) KÍ; (Albania) Egnatia

Main Path
Group 1		Group 2	
Seeded	Unseeded	Seeded	Unseeded
(Scotland) Rangers; (Turkey) Beşiktaş; (Greece) PAOK; (Austria) Red Bull Salzburg	(Belgium) Anderlecht; (Cyprus) Pafos; (Poland) Jagiellonia Białystok; (Czech Republic) Hradec Králové	(Portugal) Benfica; (Hungary) Ferencváros; (Bulgaria) CSKA Sofia	(Israel) Maccabi Tel Aviv; (Scotland) Heart of Midlothian; (Poland) Górnik Zabrze

Notes

1. ^{†} Losers of the Champions League second qualifying round, whose identity was not known at the time of draw. Teams in italics lost to a team with a lower coefficient, thus effectively taking the coefficient of their opponent in the draw.
2. ^{††} Winners of the second qualifying round, whose identity was not known at the time of draw. Teams in italics defeated a team with a higher coefficient, thus effectively taking the coefficient of their opponent in the draw.

=== Summary ===
The first legs were played on 4, 5 and 6 August, and the second legs were played on 11, 13 and 14 August 2026.

The winners of the ties advanced to the play-off round. The losers were transferred to the Conference League play-off round.

Third qualifying round
Team 1	Agg.	Team 2	1st leg	2nd leg
Champions Path
Larne (Northern Ireland)	1–2	(Georgia (country)) Iberia 1999	0–0	1–2 (a.e.t.)
Lincoln Red Imps (Gibraltar)	1–2	(Cyprus) Omonia	1–1	0–1
KuPS (Finland)	2–3	(Romania) Universitatea Craiova	1–1	1–2
Shamrock Rovers (Republic of Ireland)	4–6	(Albania) Egnatia	3–1	1–5
Lech Poznań (Poland)	6–0	(Faroe Islands) KÍ	1–0	5–0
Thun (Switzerland)	5–3	(Iceland) Víkingur Reykjavík	3–0	2–3
Main Path
Hradec Králové (Czech Republic)	0–2	(Turkey) Beşiktaş	0–1	0–1
Jagiellonia Białystok (Poland)	3–2	(Scotland) Rangers	2–1	1–1
PAOK (Greece)	2–4	(Belgium) Anderlecht	0–1	2–3
Red Bull Salzburg (Austria)	4–3 (Note: The order of the legs was reversed after the original draw because the Red Bull Arena was scheduled to host the UEFA Super Cup on 12 August.)	(Cyprus) Pafos	1–0	3–3
Benfica (Portugal)	7–2	(Scotland) Heart of Midlothian	6–1	1–1
Maccabi Tel Aviv (Israel)	3–4	(Bulgaria) CSKA Sofia	0–3	3–1
Ferencváros (Hungary)	2–1	(Poland) Górnik Zabrze	1–0	1–1

=== Champions Path matches ===
4 August 2026
21:00 (20:00 UTC+1)

Larne (Northern Ireland)	0–0	(Georgia (country)) Iberia 1999
	Report

Inver Park, Larne
Attendance: 1,967
Referee: Mohammad Al-Emara (Finland)
11 August 2026
18:00 (20:00 UTC+4)

Iberia 1999 (Georgia (country))	2–1 (a.e.t.)	(Northern Ireland) Larne
Bedoshvili 74'; Sikharulashvili 102'	Report	Simpson 76'

Mikheil Meskhi Stadium, Tbilisi
Attendance: 11,130
Referee: Rohit Saggi (Norway)

Iberia 1999 won 2–1 on aggregate.

6 August 2026
19:00

Lincoln Red Imps (Gibraltar)	1–1	(Cyprus) Omonia
Rutjens 71'	Report	Andreou 90+3'

Europa Point Stadium, Gibraltar
Attendance: 716
Referee: Aliyar Aghayev (Azerbaijan)
13 August 2026
19:00 (20:00 UTC+3)

Omonia (Cyprus)	1–0	(Gibraltar) Lincoln Red Imps
Diony 22'	Report

GSP Stadium, Nicosia
Attendance: 10,691
Referee: Sebastian Gishamer (Austria)

Omonia won 2–1 on aggregate.

6 August 2026
17:00 (18:00 UTC+3)

KuPS (Finland)	1–1	(Romania) Universitatea Craiova
Moreno 72'	Report	Baiaram 38'

Kuopio Football Stadium, Kuopio
Attendance: 1,757
Referee: Ondřej Berka (Czech Republic)
13 August 2026
19:00 (20:00 UTC+3)

Universitatea Craiova (Romania)	2–1	(Finland) KuPS
Nsimba 43' (pen.); Mora 62'	Report	Gasc 4'

Ion Oblemenco Stadium, Craiova
Attendance: 22,132
Referee: Nenad Minaković (Serbia)

Universitatea Craiova won 3–2 on aggregate.

4 August 2026
21:00 (20:00 UTC+1)

Shamrock Rovers (Republic of Ireland)	3–1	(Albania) Egnatia
Burke 29' (pen.); Pico 55'; Byrne 57'	Report	Jaime 41'

Tallaght Stadium, Dublin
Attendance: 5,047
Referee: Andris Treimanis (Latvia)
13 August 2026
21:00

Egnatia (Albania)	5–1	(Republic of Ireland) Shamrock Rovers
Adjessa 4', 38'; Albanese 11', 58'; Gruda 20'	Report	Burke 74'

Egnatia Arena, Rrogozhinë
Attendance: 4,000
Referee: Georgi Kabakov (Bulgaria)

Egnatia won 6–4 on aggregate.

6 August 2026
19:00

Lech Poznań (Poland)	1–0	(Faroe Islands) KÍ
Agnero 81'	Report

Poznań Stadium, Poznań
Attendance: 16,541
Referee: Orel Grinfeld (Israel)
14 August 2026 (Note: The KÍ v Lech Poznań match, originally scheduled for 13 August 2026, 20:45 (19:45 UTC+1), was postponed to the following day due to heavy fog that disrupted the travel of Lech Poznań from landing in the Faroe Islands.)
20:00 (19:00 UTC+1)

KÍ (Faroe Islands)	0–5	(Poland) Lech Poznań
	Report	Sayyadmanesh 20'; Rodríguez 49'; Kozubal 75'; Håkans 88'; Wålemark 90+2'

Tórsvøllur, Tórshavn (Note: KÍ played their home match at Tórsvøllur in Tórshavn instead of their regular stadium, Við Djúpumýrar in Klaksvík, which did not fulfill UEFA requirements.)
Attendance: 1,465
Referee: Igor Pajač (Croatia)

Lech Poznań won 6–0 on aggregate.

6 August 2026
20:00

Thun (Switzerland)	3–0	(Iceland) Víkingur Reykjavík
Bamert 19'; Labeau 25'; Saiz 90+4'	Report

Stockhorn Arena, Thun
Attendance: 6,167
Referee: Giorgi Kruashvili (Georgia)
13 August 2026
19:30 (17:30 UTC)

Víkingur Reykjavík (Iceland)	3–2	(Switzerland) Thun
Sigurðsson 16'; Þórðarson 38'; Ingimundarson 55'	Report	Fehr 10'; Labeau 36'

Víkingsvöllur, Reykjavík
Attendance: 1,108
Referee: Luís Godinho (Portugal)

Thun won 5–3 on aggregate.

=== Main Path matches ===
6 August 2026
19:00

Hradec Králové (Czech Republic)	0–1	(Turkey) Beşiktaş
	Report	Kılıçsoy 80'

Malšovická aréna, Hradec Králové
Attendance: 9,300
Referee: Horațiu Feșnic (Romania)
13 August 2026
19:00 (20:00 UTC+3)

Beşiktaş (Turkey)	1–0	(Czech Republic) Hradec Králové
Černý 40'	Report

Beşiktaş Stadium, Istanbul
Attendance: 30,929
Referee: Urs Schnyder (Switzerland)

Beşiktaş won 2–0 on aggregate.

6 August 2026
18:00

Jagiellonia Białystok (Poland)	2–1	(Scotland) Rangers
Fernandez 13' (o.g.); Szmyt 21'	Report	Montóia 4' (o.g.)

Stadion Miejski, Białystok
Attendance: 19,931
Referee: Nikola Dabanović (Montenegro)
13 August 2026
20:30 (19:30 UTC+1)

Rangers (Scotland)	1–1	(Poland) Jagiellonia Białystok
Shankland 19' (pen.)	Report	Prelec 65'

Ibrox Stadium, Glasgow
Attendance: 41,636
Referee: Vasilios Fotias (Greece)

Jagiellonia Białystok won 3–2 on aggregate.

6 August 2026
19:45 (20:45 UTC+3)

PAOK (Greece)	0–1	(Belgium) Anderlecht
	Report	Cvetković 1'

Toumba Stadium, Thessaloniki
Attendance: 19,161
Referee: Juan Martínez Munuera (Spain)
13 August 2026
20:30

Anderlecht (Belgium)	3–2	(Greece) PAOK
Pétrot 20'; Ambros 47'; Sikan 55'	Report	Živković 34'; Jeremejeff 88' (pen.)

Constant Vanden Stock Stadium, Brussels
Attendance: 17,976
Referee: Simone Sozza (Italy)

Anderlecht won 4–2 on aggregate.

6 August 2026
19:00

Red Bull Salzburg (Austria)	1–0	(Cyprus) Pafos
Tabaković 88'	Report

Red Bull Arena, Salzburg
Attendance: 7,704
Referee: Damian Sylwestrzak (Poland)
13 August 2026
19:00 (20:00 UTC+3)

Pafos (Cyprus)	3–3	(Austria) Red Bull Salzburg
Lelê 15'; Biel 37'; Mammadov 84'	Report	Tabaković 54', 58' (pen.), 70'

Alphamega Stadium, Limassol
Attendance: 6,183
Referee: João Pinheiro (Portugal)

Red Bull Salzburg won 4–3 on aggregate.

6 August 2026
21:00 (20:00 UTC+1)

Benfica (Portugal)	6–1	(Scotland) Heart of Midlothian
R. Silva 3'; Araújo 23'; Pavlidis 42' (pen.); Prestianni 59'; Durán 87'; Schjelderup 90+4' (pen.)	Report	Renaud 72'

Estádio da Luz, Lisbon
Attendance: 60,776
Referee: Marian Barbu (Romania)
13 August 2026
20:45 (19:45 UTC+1)

Heart of Midlothian (Scotland)	1–1	(Portugal) Benfica
Magnússon 77'	Report	Lukébakio 79'

Tynecastle Park, Edinburgh
Attendance: 17,068
Referee: Sander van der Eijk (Netherlands)

Benfica won 7–2 on aggregate.

6 August 2026
18:00 (20:00 UTC+4)

Maccabi Tel Aviv (Israel)	0–3	(Bulgaria) CSKA Sofia
	Report	Ebong 9'; Godoy 29'; Zwarts 90'

Adjarabet Arena, Batumi, Georgia
Attendance: 119
Referee: Manfredas Lukjančukas (Lithuania)
13 August 2026
20:00 (21:00 UTC+3)

CSKA Sofia (Bulgaria)	1–3	(Israel) Maccabi Tel Aviv
Sensi 66'	Report	Do. Peretz 12'; Sokler 61'; Hélio Varela 69'

Vasil Levski National Stadium, Sofia
Attendance: 23,653
Referee: Daniel Schlager (Germany)

CSKA Sofia won 4–3 on aggregate.

5 August 2026
20:15

Ferencváros (Hungary)	1–0	(Poland) Górnik Zabrze
Corbu 65'	Report

Ferencváros Stadion, Budapest
Attendance: 12,870
Referee: Javier Alberola Rojas (Spain)
13 August 2026
19:00

Górnik Zabrze (Poland)	1–1	(Hungary) Ferencváros
Urbański 45' (pen.)	Report	Sáček 82' (o.g.)

Arena Zabrze, Zabrze
Attendance: 23,348
Referee: Andrea Colombo (Italy)

Ferencváros won 2–1 on aggregate.

== Play-off round ==
The draw for the play-off round was held on 3 August 2026.

=== Seeding ===
A total of 24 teams played in the play-off round. Seeding of the teams was based on their 2026 UEFA club coefficients. Before the draw, UEFA formed groups of seeded and unseeded teams per the principles set by the Club Competitions Committee. The first team drawn in each tie was the home team for the first leg.

Group 1		Group 2		Group 3	
Seeded	Unseeded	Seeded	Unseeded	Seeded	Unseeded
(Hungary) Ferencváros; (Czech Republic) Viktoria Plzeň; (Cyprus) Omonia; (Romania) Universitatea Craiova	(Serbia) Red Star Belgrade; (Belgium) Sint-Truiden; (Turkey) Trabzonspor; Ararat-Armenia	(Poland) Jagiellonia Białystok; (Belgium) Anderlecht; (Austria) Red Bull Salzburg; (Albania) Egnatia	(Georgia (country)) Iberia 1999; (Norway) Lillestrøm; (Kazakhstan) Kairat; (Sweden) Mjällby	(Portugal) Benfica; (Bulgaria) CSKA Sofia; (Poland) Lech Poznań; (Turkey) Beşiktaş	(Switzerland) Thun; (Greece) OFI; (Denmark) AGF; (Lithuania) Kauno Žalgiris

Notes

1. ^{†} Losers of the Champions League third qualifying round, whose identity was not known at the time of draw. Teams in italics lost to a team with a lower coefficient, thus effectively taking the coefficient of their opponent in the draw.
2. ^{††} Winners of the third qualifying round, whose identity was not known at the time of draw. Teams in italics defeated a team with a higher coefficient, thus effectively taking the coefficient of their opponent in the draw.

=== Summary ===
The first legs were played on 20 August, and the second legs were played on 27 August 2026.

The winners of the ties advanced to the league phase. The losers were transferred to the Conference League league phase.

Play-off round
Team 1	Agg.	Team 2	1st leg	2nd leg
Trabzonspor (Turkey)	0–5	(Hungary) Ferencváros	0–1	0–4
Universitatea Craiova (Romania)	1–2	Ararat-Armenia	1–1	0–1
Sint-Truiden (Belgium)	3–4	(Cyprus) Omonia	1–0	2–4
Red Star Belgrade (Serbia)	4–5	(Czech Republic) Viktoria Plzeň	3–0	1–5 (a.e.t.)
Egnatia (Albania)	1–2	(Norway) Lillestrøm	0–0	1–2 (a.e.t.)
Jagiellonia Białystok (Poland)	6–1	(Georgia (country)) Iberia 1999	4–0	2–1
Mjällby AIF (Sweden)	0–4	(Austria) Red Bull Salzburg	0–1	0–3
Kairat (Kazakhstan)	0–6	(Belgium) Anderlecht	0–3	0–3
Lech Poznań (Poland)	9–2	(Switzerland) Thun	7–0	2–2
Beşiktaş (Turkey)	3–1	(Lithuania) Kauno Žalgiris	3–0	0–1
Benfica (Portugal)	6–2	(Denmark) AGF	3–1	3–1
OFI (Greece)	5–0	(Bulgaria) CSKA Sofia	3–0	2–0

=== Matches ===
20 August 2026
19:00 (20:00 UTC+3)

Trabzonspor (Turkey)	0–1	(Hungary) Ferencváros
	Report	Zachariassen 17'

Şenol Güneş Sports Complex, Trabzon
Attendance: 32,569
Referee: Igor Pajač (Croatia)
27 August 2026
20:30

Ferencváros (Hungary)	4–0	(Turkey) Trabzonspor
O'Dowda 19'; Corbu 54'; Dele 59' (pen.); Lisztes 86'	Report

Ferencváros Stadion, Budapest
Attendance: 21,011
Referee: Rade Obrenović (Slovenia)

Ferencváros won 5–0 on aggregate.

20 August 2026
19:00 (20:00 UTC+3)

Universitatea Craiova (Romania)	1–1	Ararat-Armenia
Bancu 33'	Report	Malis 21'

Ion Oblemenco Stadium, Craiova
Attendance: 22,712
Referee: Nick Walsh (Scotland)
27 August 2026
18:00 (20:00 UTC+4)

Ararat-Armenia	1–0	(Romania) Universitatea Craiova
Lima 90+8'	Report

Vazgen Sargsyan Republican Stadium, Yerevan (Note: Ararat-Armenia played their home match at the Vazgen Sargsyan Republican Stadium in Yerevan, instead of their regular home ground, Yerevan Football Academy Stadium in Yerevan.)
Attendance: 9,280
Referee: Donatas Rumšas (Lithuania)

Ararat-Armenia won 2–1 on aggregate.

20 August 2026
20:00

Sint-Truiden (Belgium)	1–0	(Cyprus) Omonia
Taniguchi 90+4'	Report

Stayen Stadium, Sint-Truiden
Attendance: 6,214
Referee: Georgi Kabakov (Bulgaria)
27 August 2026
19:00 (20:00 UTC+3)

Omonia (Cyprus)	4–2	(Belgium) Sint-Truiden
Diony 16' (pen.), 29', 50'; Panagiotou 83'	Report	Sebaoui 33' (pen.), 90+2'

GSP Stadium, Nicosia
Attendance: 15,008
Referee: Damian Sylwestrzak (Poland)

Omonia won 4–3 on aggregate.

20 August 2026
20:00

Red Star Belgrade (Serbia)	3–0	(Czech Republic) Viktoria Plzeň
Ivanić 36', 53'; Katai 90' (pen.)	Report

Red Star Stadium, Belgrade
Attendance: 31,418
Referee: Espen Eskås (Norway)
27 August 2026
19:00

Viktoria Plzeň (Czech Republic)	5–1 (a.e.t.)	(Serbia) Red Star Belgrade
Adu 8'; Višinský 58' (pen.); Hrošovský 63'; Kabongo 90+5' (pen.); Krčík 96'	Report	Ivanić 11'

Doosan Arena, Plzeň
Attendance: 9,233
Referee: Danny Makkelie (Netherlands)

Viktoria Plzeň won 5–4 on aggregate.

20 August 2026
19:00

Egnatia (Albania)	0–0	(Norway) Lillestrøm
	Report

Egnatia Arena, Rrogozhinë
Attendance: 4,000
Referee: Willy Delajod (France)
27 August 2026
19:00

Lillestrøm (Norway)	2–1 (a.e.t.)	(Albania) Egnatia
Moen Foss 82'; Olsen 94'	Report	Sota 33'

Åråsen Stadion, Lillestrøm
Attendance: 8,010
Referee: João Pinheiro (Portugal)

Lillestrøm won 2–1 on aggregate.

20 August 2026
18:00

Jagiellonia Białystok (Poland)	4–0	(Georgia (country)) Iberia 1999
Imaz 34' (pen.); Agbonifo 45+2'; Alhassan 62' (o.g.); Lozano 90+2'	Report

Stadion Miejski, Białystok
Attendance: 19,108
Referee: Ricardo de Burgos Bengoetxea (Spain)
27 August 2026
18:00 (20:00 UTC+4)

Iberia 1999 (Georgia (country))	1–2	(Poland) Jagiellonia Białystok
Natchkebia 35'	Report	Imaz 31' (pen.); Klynge 70'

Mikheil Meskhi Stadium, Tbilisi
Attendance: 3,014
Referee: Simone Sozza (Italy)

Jagiellonia Białystok won 6–1 on aggregate.

20 August 2026
18:00

Mjällby AIF (Sweden)	0–1	(Austria) Red Bull Salzburg
	Report	Pettersson 90+2' (o.g.)

Strandvallen, Hällevik
Attendance: 3,079
Referee: Mykola Balakin (Ukraine)
27 August 2026
19:00

Red Bull Salzburg (Austria)	3–0	(Sweden) Mjällby AIF
Konaté 61', 68'; Tabaković 80'	Report

Red Bull Arena, Salzburg
Attendance: 7,654
Referee: Irfan Peljto (Bosnia and Herzegovina)

Red Bull Salzburg won 4–0 on aggregate.

20 August 2026
17:00 (20:00 UTC+5)

Kairat (Kazakhstan)	0–3	(Belgium) Anderlecht
	Report	Oksanen 2' (o.g.); Ambros 24'; Sikan 45+1'

Central Stadium, Almaty
Attendance: 17,563
Referee: Chris Kavanagh (England)
27 August 2026
20:30

Anderlecht (Belgium)	3–0	(Kazakhstan) Kairat
Cvetković 45+2' (pen.); Sikan 54'; Biancone 71'	Report

Constant Vanden Stock Stadium, Brussels
Attendance: 16,861
Referee: Espen Eskås (Norway)

Anderlecht won 6–0 on aggregate.

20 August 2026
19:00

Lech Poznań (Poland)	7–0	(Switzerland) Thun
Wålemark 10', 25'; Sayyadmanesh 20'; Skrzypczak 31'; Murawski 45'; Håkans 48'; Gumny 79'	Report

Poznań Stadium, Poznań
Attendance: 22,241
Referee: Sebastian Gishamer (Austria)
27 August 2026
20:00

Thun (Switzerland)	2–2	(Poland) Lech Poznań
Lengen 22'; Dursun 43'	Report	Gumny 17'; Wålemark 68'

Stockhorn Arena, Thun
Attendance: 5,523
Referee: Halil Umut Meler (Turkey)

Lech Poznań won 9–2 on aggregate.

20 August 2026
19:00 (20:00 UTC+3)

Beşiktaş (Turkey)	3–0	(Lithuania) Kauno Žalgiris
Oh Hyeon-gyu 6'; Murillo 12'; Kökçü 59' (pen.)	Report

Beşiktaş Stadium, Istanbul
Attendance: 31,494
Referee: Tobias Stieler (Germany)
27 August 2026
19:00 (20:00 UTC+3)

Kauno Žalgiris (Lithuania)	1–0	(Turkey) Beşiktaş
Oliveira 64'	Report

Darius and Girėnas Stadium, Kaunas
Attendance: 7,079
Referee: Jesús Gil Manzano (Spain)

Beşiktaş won 3–1 on aggregate.

20 August 2026
21:00 (20:00 UTC+1)

Benfica (Portugal)	3–1	(Denmark) AGF
R. Silva 2'; Barreiro 31'; Pavlidis 45+2' (pen.)	Report	Jørgensen 36'

Estádio da Luz, Lisbon
Attendance: 59,147
Referee: Marco Guida (Italy)
27 August 2026
20:00

AGF (Denmark)	1–3	(Portugal) Benfica
Carstensen 60'	Report	Prestianni 19', 61'; R. Silva 56'

Randers Stadium, Randers (Note: AGF played their home match at the Cepheus Park in Randers, instead of their regular home ground, Ceres Park in Aarhus, which was undergoing major renovation.)
Attendance: 8,945
Referee: Daniel Siebert (Germany)

Benfica won 6–2 on aggregate.

20 August 2026
20:00 (21:00 UTC+3)

OFI (Greece)	3–0	(Bulgaria) CSKA Sofia
Fountas 19', 51' (pen.); Dickmann 90+5'	Report

Pankritio Stadium, Heraklion
Attendance: 12,668
Referee: Srđan Jovanović (Serbia)
27 August 2026
20:00 (21:00 UTC+3)

CSKA Sofia (Bulgaria)	0–2	(Greece) OFI
	Report	Nuss 36'; Theodosoulakis 78'

Vasil Levski National Stadium, Sofia
Attendance: 18,428
Referee: Ivan Kružliak (Slovakia)

OFI won 5–0 on aggregate.
