= List of English football transfers winter 2022–23 =

English football transfer window

The 2022–23 English football winter transfer window ran from 1 January to 31 January 2023. Players without a club could be signed at any time, clubs could sign players on loan dependent on their league's regulations, and clubs could sign a goalkeeper on an emergency loan if they had no registered senior goalkeeper available. This list includes transfers featuring at least one club from either the Premier League or the EFL that were completed after the end of the summer 2022 transfer window on 1 September 2022 and before the end of the 2023 winter window.

== Transfers ==
All players and clubs without a flag are English. While Cardiff City, Swansea City and Newport County are affiliated with the Football Association of Wales and thus take the Welsh flag, they play in the Championship and League Two respectively, and so their transfers are included here.

Date	Name	Moving from	Moving to	Fee
2 September 2022	Robbie Hemfrey	Unattached	Rotherham United	Free
2 September 2022	Chris Hussey	Unattached	Stockport County	Free
2 September 2022	(Republic of Ireland) Daniel Okwute	(Republic of Ireland) Kerry	Stockport County	Undisclosed
5 September 2022	Jacob Maddox	Unattached	Walsall	Free
5 September 2022	Jonas Mukuna	Unattached	Walsall	Free
7 September 2022	Sean O'Brien	Unattached	Forest Green Rovers	Free
7 September 2022	(Saint Lucia) Terell Thomas	Unattached	Charlton Athletic	Free
8 September 2022	(Australia) Massimo Luongo	Unattached	Middlesbrough	Free
8 September 2022	Nathan Redmond	Southampton	(Turkey) Beşiktaş	Undisclosed
8 September 2022	Sam Winnall	Unattached	Burton Albion	Free
11 September 2022	(Finland) Will Jääskeläinen	Unattached	AFC Wimbledon	Free
12 September 2022	(The Gambia) Mustapha Carayol	Unattached	Burton Albion	Free
12 September 2022	(Spain) Diego Costa	Unattached	Wolverhampton Wanderers	Free
12 September 2022	(Germany) Loris Karius	Unattached	Newcastle United	Free
12 September 2022	(Scotland) Chris Maguire	Unattached	Hartlepool United	Free
12 September 2022	(Australia) Tom Rogic	Unattached	West Bromwich Albion	Free
13 September 2022	Jacob Davenport	Unattached	Lincoln City	Free
13 September 2022	(Switzerland) Eldin Jakupović	Unattached	Everton	Free
13 September 2022	(Senegal) Amadou Mbengue	Unattached	Reading	Free
13 September 2022	(Netherlands) Erik Pieters	Unattached	West Bromwich Albion	Free
15 September 2022	Andy Carroll	Unattached	Reading	Free
20 September 2022	Nathan Delfouneso	Unattached	Accrington Stanley	Free
23 September 2022	David Martin	Unattached	Milton Keynes Dons	Free
25 September 2022	(Brazil) Allan	Everton	(United Arab Emirates) Al Wahda	Undisclosed
27 September 2022	James Pardington	Unattached	Grimsby Town	Free
30 September 2022	Liam Bridcutt	Unattached	Blackpool	Free
3 October 2022	(Cameroon) Bobby Kamwa	Unattached	Burton Albion	Free
7 October 2022	(Jamaica) Adrian Mariappa	Unattached	Burton Albion	Free
8 October 2022	(Scotland) Calum Macdonald	Unattached	Stockport County	Free
13 October 2022	Elijah Dixon-Bonner	Unattached	Queens Park Rangers	Free
13 October 2022	(Jamaica) Theo Robinson	Unattached	Hartlepool United	Free
18 October 2022	Scott Sinclair	Unattached	Bristol Rovers	Free
12 November 2022	(Ghana) Joe Dodoo	Unattached	Burton Albion	Free
22 November 2022	(Scotland) Dylan McGeouch	Unattached	Forest Green Rovers	Free
22 November 2022	Lewis Page	Unattached	Mansfield Town	Free
23 November 2022	(Guyana) Callum Harriott	Unattached	Gillingham	Free
9 December 2022	Danny Lloyd	Unattached	Rochdale	Free
12 December 2022	Josh Harrop	Unattached	Northampton Town	Free
13 December 2022	(Scotland) Phil Bardsley	Unattached	Stockport County	Free
14 December 2022	(Curaçao) Leandro Bacuna	Unattached	Watford	Free
30 December 2022	Charlie Austin	Unattached	Swindon Town	Free
1 January 2023	(Republic of Ireland) Aidomo Emakhu	(Republic of Ireland) Shamrock Rovers	Millwall	Undisclosed
1 January 2023	(Netherlands) Cody Gakpo	(Netherlands) PSV	Liverpool	£35.4m
1 January 2023	(Republic of Ireland) Ciaran Kelly	(Republic of Ireland) Bohemians	Bradford City	Free
1 January 2023	(Canada) Ismaël Koné	(Canada) CF Montréal	Watford	Undisclosed
1 January 2023	(Australia) Garang Kuol	(Australia) Central Coast Mariners	Newcastle United	£300,000
1 January 2023	(Brazil) Luizão	(Brazil) São Paulo	West Ham United	Undisclosed
1 January 2023	(Republic of Ireland) Andy Lyons	(Republic of Ireland) Shamrock Rovers	Blackpool	Free
1 January 2023	(Republic of Ireland) Stephan Negru	(Republic of Ireland) Shelbourne	Oxford United	Free
1 January 2023	Elliot Newby	Stockport County	Barrow	Undisclosed
1 January 2023	Tom Nichols	Crawley Town	Gillingham	Undisclosed
1 January 2023	Isaac Olaofe	Millwall	Stockport County	Undisclosed
1 January 2023	(Scotland) Phoenix Patterson	(Republic of Ireland) Waterford	Fleetwood Town	Undisclosed
1 January 2023	(Brazil) Gustavo Scarpa	(Brazil) Palmeiras	Nottingham Forest	Free
1 January 2023	(New Zealand) Ben Waine	(New Zealand) Wellington Phoenix	Plymouth Argyle	Undisclosed
2 January 2023	Saxon Earley	Norwich City	Plymouth Argyle	Undisclosed
3 January 2023	Jake Forster-Caskey	Charlton Athletic	Stevenage	Undisclosed
3 January 2023	(Republic of Ireland) Fiachra Pagel	(Republic of Ireland) Drogheda United	Forest Green Rovers	Undisclosed
3 January 2023	(Austria) Maximilian Wöber	(Austria) Red Bull Salzburg	Leeds United	Undisclosed
4 January 2023	(Republic of Ireland) Fiacre Kelleher	Bradford City	Colchester United	Undisclosed
4 January 2023	(Republic of Ireland) Jamie Mullins	(Republic of Ireland) Bohemians	Brighton & Hove Albion	Undisclosed
4 January 2023	Arthur Read	Stevenage	Colchester United	Undisclosed
4 January 2023	Callum Wright	Blackpool	Plymouth Argyle	Undisclosed
5 January 2023	(France) Benoît Badiashile	(France) Monaco	Chelsea	£35m
5 January 2023	(Republic of Ireland) Rory Feely	(Republic of Ireland) Bohemians	Barrow	Undisclosed
5 January 2023	(Jamaica) Jordon Garrick	(Wales) Swansea City	Forest Green Rovers	Undisclosed
5 January 2023	(Republic of Ireland) David Harrington	(Republic of Ireland) Cork City	Fleetwood Town	Undisclosed
5 January 2023	(Switzerland) Florian Kamberi	Unattached	Huddersfield Town	Free
5 January 2023	(Republic of Ireland) Kevin Long	Burnley	Birmingham City	Undisclosed
5 January 2023	Toby Sims	Unattached	Harrogate Town	Free
5 January 2023	Randell Williams	Hull City	Bolton Wanderers	Undisclosed
6 January 2023	Ryan Bennett	Unattached	Cambridge United	Free
6 January 2023	(Republic of Ireland) Neill Byrne	Tranmere Rovers	Stockport County	Undisclosed
6 January 2023	Callum Dolan	Warrington Rylands	Fleetwood Town	Undisclosed
6 January 2023	(Australia) Massimo Luongo	Middlesbrough	Ipswich Town	Free
6 January 2023	(Croatia) Mislav Oršić	(Croatia) Dinamo Zagreb	Southampton	£8m
6 January 2023	(Scotland) Jamie Robson	Lincoln City	Forest Green Rovers	Undisclosed
6 January 2023	Ryley Towler	Bristol City	Portsmouth	Undisclosed
7 January 2023	(Ivory Coast) David Datro Fofana	(Norway) Molde	Chelsea	£9m
7 January 2023	(Brazil) Andrey Santos	(Brazil) Vasco da Gama	Chelsea	£18m
8 January 2023	Ashley Westwood	Burnley	(United States) Charlotte	Free
9 January 2023	(Wales) Nathan Broadhead	Everton	Ipswich Town	Undisclosed
9 January 2023	(Sierra Leone) Steven Caulker	(Turkey) Fatih Karagümrük	Wigan Athletic	Free
9 January 2023	Matt Derbyshire	(India) NorthEast United	Bradford City	Free
9 January 2023	(Portugal) João Ferreira	(Portugal) Benfica	Watford	Undisclosed
9 January 2023	Will Goodwin	Stoke City	Cheltenham Town	Undisclosed
9 January 2023	Peter Hartley	(India) Jamshedpur	Hartlepool United	Free
9 January 2023	Matt Jay	Exeter City	Colchester United	Undisclosed
9 January 2023	(Republic of Ireland) Tyreik Wright	Aston Villa	Plymouth Argyle	Undisclosed
10 January 2023	Daniel Crowley	(Netherlands) Willem II	Morecambe	Undisclosed
10 January 2023	(Scotland) Ross Doohan	Tranmere Rovers	Forest Green Rovers	Undisclosed
10 January 2023	Sean Morrison	(Wales) Cardiff City	Rotherham United	Free
11 January 2023	(Argentina) Carlos Alcaraz	(Argentina) Racing Club	Southampton	£12m
11 January 2023	Lee Angol	Bradford City	Sutton United	Undisclosed
11 January 2023	(France) Timothée Dieng	Exeter City	Gillingham	Undisclosed
11 January 2023	Daniel Dodds	Middlesbrough	Hartlepool United	Undisclosed
11 January 2023	(Spain) Álex Moreno	(Spain) Real Betis	Aston Villa	£13.2m
11 January 2023	Elliott Nevitt	Tranmere Rovers	Crewe Alexandra	Undisclosed
11 January 2023	(Republic of Ireland) Anthony O'Connor	Morecambe	Harrogate Town	Free
11 January 2023	(Germany) Tom Trybull	(Germany) SV Sandhausen	Blackpool	Free
12 January 2023	(Sierra Leone) Amadou Bakayoko	Bolton Wanderers	Forest Green Rovers	Undisclosed
12 January 2023	(Zimbabwe) Macauley Bonne	Queens Park Rangers	Charlton Athletic	Free
12 January 2023	Oliver Hawkins	Mansfield Town	Gillingham	Undisclosed
12 January 2023	Mark Helm	Burnley	Burton Albion	Undisclosed
12 January 2023	Alfie Kilgour	Bristol Rovers	Mansfield Town	Undisclosed
12 January 2023	Teddy Mfuni	Warrington Town	Oxford United	Free
12 January 2023	Glenn Morris	Crawley Town	Gillingham	Free
12 January 2023	Brad Walker	Port Vale	Tranmere Rovers	Undisclosed
13 January 2023	(Belgium) Ameen Al-Dakhil	(Belgium) Sint-Truidense	Burnley	Undisclosed
13 January 2023	Callum Johnson	(Scotland) Ross County	Mansfield Town	Undisclosed
13 January 2023	Kyle Knoyle	Doncaster Rovers	Stockport County	Undisclosed
13 January 2023	(Gabon) Mario Lemina	(France) Nice	Wolverhampton Wanderers	£9.7m
13 January 2023	(Scotland) Craig MacGillivray	Charlton Athletic	Burton Albion	Undisclosed
13 January 2023	(Jamaica) Jamille Matt	Forest Green Rovers	Walsall	Undisclosed
13 January 2023	Callum Morton	Fleetwood Town	Salford City	Undisclosed
13 January 2023	(Albania) Edon Pruti	Brentford	Hartlepool United	Undisclosed
14 January 2023	Josef Bursik	Stoke City	(Belgium) Club Brugge	Undisclosed
14 January 2023	Tom King	Salford City	Northampton Town	Free
14 January 2023	George Lapslie	Mansfield Town	Gillingham	Undisclosed
14 January 2023	(France) Georginio Rutter	(Germany) TSG 1899 Hoffenheim	Leeds United	£36m
15 January 2023	(Ukraine) Mykhailo Mudryk	(Ukraine) Shakhtar Donetsk	Chelsea	£89m
15 January 2023	Louis Reed	Swindon Town	Mansfield Town	Undisclosed
16 January 2023	Jake Cain	Liverpool	Swindon Town	Undisclosed
16 January 2023	(Brazil) Danilo	(Brazil) Palmeiras	Nottingham Forest	£16m
17 January 2023	(Republic of Ireland) Harry Charsley	Port Vale	(Wales) Newport County	Undisclosed
17 January 2023	(France) Frédéric Guilbert	Aston Villa	(France) Strasbourg	Undisclosed
17 January 2023	(Spain) Pablo Sarabia	(France) Paris Saint-Germain	Wolverhampton Wanderers	£4.4m
17 January 2023	(United States) Indiana Vassilev	Aston Villa	(United States) St. Louis City	Undisclosed
18 January 2023	(Republic of Ireland) Barry Cotter	(Republic of Ireland) Shamrock Rovers	Barnsley	Undisclosed
19 January 2023	Dapo Afolayan	Bolton Wanderers	(Germany) FC St. Pauli	Undisclosed
19 January 2023	David Amoo	Stevenage	Crewe Alexandra	Free
19 January 2023	Jayden Clarke	Dulwich Hamlet	Gillingham	Undisclosed
19 January 2023	Ethan Coleman	Leyton Orient	Gillingham	Undisclosed
19 January 2023	Adam Clayton	Doncaster Rovers	Bradford City	Free
19 January 2023	Max Dean	Leeds United	Milton Keynes Dons	Undisclosed
19 January 2023	Joe Garner	Fleetwood Town	Carlisle United	Undisclosed
19 January 2023	(Burkina Faso) Dango Ouattara	(France) Lorient	AFC Bournemouth	£20m
19 January 2023	Sebastian Quirk	Everton	Accrington Stanley	Undisclosed
20 January 2023	Danny Ings	Aston Villa	West Ham United	£15m
20 January 2023	(Denmark) Victor Kristiansen	(Denmark) Copenhagen	Leicester City	£17m
20 January 2023	(Australia) Jordan Lyden	Unattached	Leyton Orient	Free
20 January 2023	Noni Madueke	(Netherlands) PSV	Chelsea	£30m
20 January 2023	(Scotland) Scott Robertson	(Scotland) Celtic	Fleetwood Town	Free
20 January 2023	(Belgium) Leandro Trossard	Brighton & Hove Albion	Arsenal	£21m
21 January 2023	(Sweden) Hjalmar Ekdal	(Sweden) Djurgården	Burnley	Undisclosed
22 January 2023	Craig Dawson	West Ham United	Wolverhampton Wanderers	£3.3m
23 January 2023	Todd Cantwell	Norwich City	(Scotland) Rangers	Undisclosed
23 January 2023	(Colombia) Jhon Durán	(United States) Chicago Fire	Aston Villa	£18m
23 January 2023	(Poland) Jakub Kiwior	(Italy) Spezia Calcio	Arsenal	£17.6m
23 January 2023	(France) Pierre Ekwah	West Ham United	Sunderland	Undisclosed
23 January 2023	(Belgium) Tyrese Omotoye	Norwich City	Forest Green Rovers	Undisclosed
23 January 2023	(Argentina) Máximo Perrone	(Argentina) Vélez Sarsfield	Manchester City	£8m
24 January 2023	(Northern Ireland) Caolan Lavery	Scunthorpe United	Doncaster Rovers	Undisclosed
24 January 2023	(Northern Ireland) Charlie McCann	(Scotland) Rangers	Forest Green Rovers	Undisclosed
25 January 2023	Dan Bentley	Bristol City	Wolverhampton Wanderers	Undisclosed
25 January 2023	(South Africa) Lyle Foster	(Belgium) Westerlo	Burnley	Undisclosed
25 January 2023	(Russia) Nikita Haikin	Unattached	Bristol City	Free
25 January 2023	Jordan Hugill	Norwich City	Rotherham United	Free
26 January 2023	James Bree	Luton Town	Southampton	Undisclosed
26 January 2023	Riccardo Di Trolio	St Albans City	Coventry City	Undisclosed
26 January 2023	Tom Hopper	Lincoln City	Colchester United	Undisclosed
26 January 2023	(Sierra Leone) Sullay Kaikai	Wycombe Wanderers	Milton Keynes Dons	Free
26 January 2023	(France) Isaac Lihadji	(France) Lille	Sunderland	Undisclosed
26 January 2023	(Republic of Ireland) Sean Maguire	Preston North End	Coventry City	Undisclosed
26 January 2023	(Republic of Ireland) Shane McLoughlin	Morecambe	Salford City	Free
26 January 2023	Demetri Mitchell	(Scotland) Hibernian	Exeter City	Free
26 January 2023	Michael Morrison	Portsmouth	Cambridge United	Free
27 January 2023	Will Aimson	Bolton Wanderers	Exeter City	Undisclosed
27 January 2023	Ayoub Assal	AFC Wimbledon	(Qatar) Al-Wakrah	Undisclosed
27 January 2023	Cameron Jerome	Luton Town	Bolton Wanderers	Free
27 January 2023	Ben Gladwin	Swindon Town	Crawley Town	Undisclosed
27 January 2023	Will Greenidge	West Ham United	Colchester United	Undisclosed
27 January 2023	(France) Hisham Kasimu	Farnborough	Sutton United	Undisclosed
27 January 2023	(Scotland) Ryan Porteous	(Scotland) Hibernian	Watford	Undisclosed
27 January 2023	Harvey Saunders	Bristol Rovers	Tranmere Rovers	Undisclosed
27 January 2023	(Ghana) Antoine Semenyo	Bristol City	AFC Bournemouth	£10m
27 January 2023	Grant Ward	Blackpool	Bristol Rovers	Free
28 January 2023	Rhys Bennett	Unattached	Rochdale	Free
28 January 2023	Curtis Nelson	(Wales) Cardiff City	Blackpool	Free
29 January 2023	(Democratic Republic of the Congo) Britt Assombalonga	(Turkey) Adana Demirspor	Watford	Undisclosed
29 January 2023	Daniel Barlaser	Rotherham United	Middlesbrough	Undisclosed
29 January 2023	Anthony Gordon	Everton	Newcastle United	£45m
29 January 2023	(France) Malo Gusto	(France) Lyon	Chelsea	£30.7m
29 January 2023	(Republic of Ireland) Aidan Keena	(Republic of Ireland) Sligo Rovers	Cheltenham Town	Undisclosed
30 January 2023	(Sweden) Yasin Ayari	(Sweden) AIK	Brighton & Hove Albion	£3.5m
30 January 2023	(Brazil) João Gomes	(Brazil) Flamengo	Wolverhampton Wanderers	£15m
30 January 2023	Josh March	Forest Green Rovers	Stevenage	Undisclosed
30 January 2023	Jack Marriott	Peterborough United	Fleetwood Town	Undisclosed
30 January 2023	Jayden Stockley	Charlton Athletic	Fleetwood Town	Undisclosed
30 January 2023	Jack Walton	Barnsley	Luton Town	Undisclosed
31 January 2023	(Belgium) Enock Agyei	(Belgium) Anderlecht	Burnley	Undisclosed
31 January 2023	(France) Naouirou Ahamada	(Germany) VfB Stuttgart	Crystal Palace	£9.7m
31 January 2023	Joe Anderson	Everton	Sunderland	Undisclosed
31 January 2023	(Scotland) Harrison Ashby	West Ham United	Newcastle United	£3m
31 January 2023	Frazer Blake-Tracy	Burton Albion	Swindon Town	Undisclosed
31 January 2023	(Peru) Yuriel Celi	(Peru) Carlos A. Mannucci	Hull City	Undisclosed
31 January 2023	Nathaniel Chalobah	Fulham	West Bromwich Albion	Undisclosed
31 January 2023	Harry Cornick	Luton Town	Bristol City	Undisclosed
31 January 2023	(Republic of Ireland) Matt Doherty	Tottenham Hotspur	(Spain) Atlético Madrid	Free
31 January 2023	(Republic of Ireland) Dylan Duffy	(Republic of Ireland) UCD	Lincoln City	Undisclosed
31 January 2023	Josh Emmanuel	Hull City	Grimsby Town	Undisclosed
31 January 2023	(Scotland) Ethan Erhahon	(Scotland) St Mirren	Lincoln City	Undisclosed
31 January 2023	(Brazil) Felipe	(Spain) Atlético Madrid	Nottingham Forest	Undisclosed
31 January 2023	(Argentina) Enzo Fernández	(Portugal) Benfica	Chelsea	£107m
31 January 2023	Oliver Finney	Crewe Alexandra	Hartlepool United	Free
31 January 2023	Gerard Garner	Fleetwood Town	Barrow	Undisclosed
31 January 2023	Kellan Gordon	Mansfield Town	Crawley Town	Undisclosed
31 January 2023	Adam Hayton	Tottenham Hotspur	Barnsley	Undisclosed
31 January 2023	Michael Hector	Unattached	Charlton Athletic	Free
31 January 2023	(Netherlands) Wesley Hoedt	(Belgium) Anderlecht	Watford	Undisclosed
31 January 2023	Connor Jennings	Stockport County	Hartlepool United	Free
31 January 2023	(Italy) Jorginho	Chelsea	Arsenal	£12m
31 January 2023	Davis Keillor-Dunn	Burton Albion	Mansfield Town	Undisclosed
31 January 2023	Brendan Kiernan	Walsall	Hartlepool United	Free
31 January 2023	(Northern Ireland) Paddy Lane	Fleetwood Town	Portsmouth	Undisclosed
31 January 2023	Emmanuel Longelo	West Ham United	Birmingham City	Undisclosed
31 January 2023	(Serbia) Saša Lukić	(Italy) Torino	Fulham	Undisclosed
31 January 2023	(Scotland) Calum Macdonald	Stockport County	Bristol Rovers	Undisclosed
31 January 2023	(Scotland) Kevin McDonald	Unattached	Exeter City	Free
31 January 2023	(Albania) Anis Mehmeti	Wycombe Wanderers	Bristol City	Undisclosed
31 January 2023	(Portugal) Diogo Monteiro	(Switzerland) Servette	Leeds United	Undisclosed
31 January 2023	Toby Mullarkey	Altrincham	Rochdale	Undisclosed
31 January 2023	Josh Onomah	Fulham	Preston North End	Free
31 January 2023	(Nigeria) Paul Onuachu	(Belgium) Genk	Southampton	Undisclosed
31 January 2023	(Ghana) Nathan Opoku	(United States) Syracuse University	Leicester City	Undisclosed
31 January 2023	(Grenada) Aaron Pierre	Sutton United	AFC Wimbledon	Free
31 January 2023	(Guinea-Bissau) Junior Quitirna	(Republic of Ireland) Waterford	Fleetwood Town	Undisclosed
31 January 2023	Jack Roles	Woking	Crawley Town	Undisclosed
31 January 2023	Jon Russell	Huddersfield Town	Barnsley	Undisclosed
31 January 2023	(Scotland) James Scott	Hull City	Exeter City	Undisclosed
31 January 2023	(Scotland) Oli Shaw	(Scotland) Kilmarnock	Barnsley	Undisclosed
31 January 2023	Jonjo Shelvey	Newcastle United	Nottingham Forest	Undisclosed
31 January 2023	Jude Soonsup-Bell	Chelsea	Tottenham Hotspur	Undisclosed
31 January 2023	(Australia) Harry Souttar	Stoke City	Leicester City	£15m
31 January 2023	Levi Sutton	Bradford City	Harrogate Town	Undisclosed
31 January 2023	(Ghana) Kamaldeen Sulemana	(France) Rennes	Southampton	£22m
31 January 2023	Sam Stubbs	Exeter City	Bradford City	Free
31 January 2023	(Wales) Joe Taylor	Peterborough United	Luton Town	Undisclosed
31 January 2023	(Wales) George Thomas	Queens Park Rangers	Cambridge United	Free
31 January 2023	(Czech Republic) Tomáš Vaclík	(Greece) Olympiacos	Huddersfield Town	Undisclosed
31 January 2023	Duncan Watmore	Middlesbrough	Millwall	Undisclosed
31 January 2023	(Ukraine) Illya Zabarnyi	(Ukraine) Dynamo Kyiv	AFC Bournemouth	£24m

== Loans ==
Start date	End date	Name	Moving from	Moving to
2 September 2022	31 May 2023	Louis Moult	Burton Albion	(Scotland) Motherwell
2 September 2022	31 May 2023	Jay Stansfield	Fulham	Exeter City
2 September 2022	31 May 2023	(Hungary) Callum Styles	Barnsley	Millwall
8 September 2022	9 October 2022	(Scotland) Joe McGlynn	Burnley	Oldham Athletic
12 September 2022	31 May 2023	(France) Ziyad Larkeche	Fulham	Barnsley
12 September 2022	31 May 2023	(Kosovo) Milot Rashica	Norwich City	(Turkey) Galatasaray
26 October 2022	26 November 2022	(Scotland) Joe McGlynn	Burnley	Hyde United
26 November 2022	3 December 2022	Alex Cairns	Fleetwood Town	Hartlepool United
1 January 2023	31 May 2023	David Ajiboye	Peterborough United	Sutton United
1 January 2023	31 May 2023	(Brazil) Matheus Cunha	(Spain) Atlético Madrid	Wolverhampton Wanderers
1 January 2023	31 May 2023	(Brazil) Matheus Martins	(Italy) Udinese	Watford
1 January 2023	31 May 2023	(Republic of Ireland) Killian Phillips	Crystal Palace	Shrewsbury Town
1 January 2023	31 May 2023	Connor Wood	Leyton Orient	Colchester United
2 January 2023	31 May 2023	(Wales) Brandon Cooper	(Wales) Swansea City	Forest Green Rovers
3 January 2023	31 May 2023	(Republic of Ireland) Fiachra Pagel	Forest Green Rovers	(Republic of Ireland) Drogheda United
3 January 2023	31 May 2023	Jack Robinson	Middlesbrough	Carlisle United
4 January 2023	31 May 2023	Alex Cairns	Fleetwood Town	Salford City
4 January 2023	31 May 2023	(Wales) Joe Low	Bristol City	Walsall
4 January 2023	31 May 2023	Matthew Lowton	Burnley	Huddersfield Town
4 January 2023	31 May 2023	(Scotland) Aaron Pressley	Brentford	Accrington Stanley
4 January 2023	31 May 2023	Morgan Rogers	Manchester City	Blackpool
4 January 2023	31 May 2023	(Germany) Kevin Schade	(Germany) SC Freiburg	Brentford
5 January 2023	31 May 2023	Josh Bowler	Nottingham Forest	Blackpool
5 January 2023	31 May 2023	Matthew Dolan	(Wales) Newport County	Hartlepool United
5 January 2023	31 May 2023	(Republic of Ireland) Daryl Horgan	Wycombe Wanderers	Stevenage
5 January 2023	31 May 2023	Dynel Simeu	Southampton	Morecambe
5 January 2023	31 May 2023	Max Watters	(Wales) Cardiff City	Barnsley
5 January 2023	31 May 2023	Robbie Willmott	(Wales) Newport County	Walsall
6 January 2023	31 May 2023	(Germany) Jordan Amissah	Sheffield United	Burton Albion
6 January 2023	31 May 2023	Cameron Archer	Aston Villa	Middlesbrough
6 January 2023	31 May 2023	Romeo Beckham	(United States) Inter Miami	Brentford
6 January 2023	31 May 2023	Harry Boyes	Sheffield United	Lincoln City
6 January 2023	31 May 2023	Jack Butland	Crystal Palace	Manchester United
6 January 2023	31 May 2023	(Republic of Ireland) Trevor Clarke	Bristol Rovers	(Republic of Ireland) Shamrock Rovers
6 January 2023	31 May 2023	(Republic of Ireland) Aaron Connolly	Brighton & Hove Albion	Hull City
6 January 2023	31 May 2023	Brandon Fleming	Hull City	Oxford United
6 January 2023	31 May 2023	Will Norris	Burnley	Peterborough United
6 January 2023	31 May 2023	Brooke Norton-Cuffy	Arsenal	Coventry City
6 January 2023	31 May 2023	(Wales) Sam Pearson	Bristol City	AFC Wimbledon
6 January 2023	31 May 2023	Steve Seddon	Oxford United	Cambridge United
6 January 2023	31 May 2023	Joe White	Newcastle United	Exeter City
8 January 2023	31 May 2023	George Hirst	Leicester City	Ipswich Town
9 January 2023	31 May 2023	(Northern Ireland) Alfie McCalmont	Leeds United	Carlisle United
9 January 2023	31 May 2023	Dan Nlundulu	Southampton	Bolton Wanderers
10 January 2023	31 May 2023	Miguel Azeez	Arsenal	Wigan Athletic
10 January 2023	31 May 2023	(Republic of Ireland) Thomas Cannon	Everton	Preston North End
10 January 2023	31 May 2023	(Germany) Reda Khadra	Brighton & Hove Albion	Birmingham City
10 January 2023	31 May 2023	Thierry Nevers	West Ham United	Bradford City
10 January 2023	31 May 2023	Josh Wilson-Esbrand	Manchester City	Coventry City
11 January 2023	31 May 2023	(Portugal) João Félix	(Spain) Atlético Madrid	Chelsea
11 January 2023	31 May 2023	(France) Anthony Knockaert	Fulham	Huddersfield Town
11 January 2023	31 May 2023	(Jamaica) Jamal Lowe	AFC Bournemouth	Queens Park Rangers
12 January 2023	31 May 2023	Ollie Crankshaw	Stockport County	(Scotland) Motherwell
12 January 2023	31 May 2023	Liam Delap	Manchester City	Preston North End
12 January 2023	31 May 2023	Jake Eastwood	Sheffield United	Rochdale
12 January 2023	31 May 2023	(Norway) Leo Hjelde	Leeds United	Rotherham United
12 January 2023	31 May 2023	Todd Kane	Coventry City	Charlton Athletic
12 January 2023	31 May 2023	(Australia) Garang Kuol	Newcastle United	(Scotland) Heart of Midlothian
12 January 2023	31 May 2023	Armani Little	Forest Green Rovers	AFC Wimbledon
12 January 2023	31 May 2023	(Turkey) Doğukan Sinik	Hull City	(Turkey) Antalyaspor
12 January 2023	31 May 2023	(Scotland) Joe McGlynn	Burnley	Kidderminster Harriers
13 January 2023	31 May 2023	(Republic of Ireland) Dara Costelloe	Burnley	Bradford City
13 January 2023	31 May 2023	John-Kymani Gordon	Crystal Palace	Carlisle United
13 January 2023	31 May 2023	Todd Miller	Brighton & Hove Albion	Doncaster Rovers
13 January 2023	31 May 2023	Nathanael Ogbeta	(Wales) Swansea City	Peterborough United
13 January 2023	31 May 2023	(Ivory Coast) Christ Tiéhi	(Czech Republic) Slovan Liberec	Wigan Athletic
13 January 2023	31 May 2023	(Wales) Ed Turns	Brighton & Hove Albion	Leyton Orient
13 January 2023	31 May 2023	Martyn Waghorn	Coventry City	Huddersfield Town
13 January 2023	31 May 2023	(Netherlands) Wout Weghorst	Burnley	Manchester United
14 January 2023	31 May 2023	Mikey O'Neill	Preston North End	Grimsby Town
14 January 2023	31 May 2023	(Republic of Ireland) Olamide Shodipo	Queens Park Rangers	Lincoln City
14 January 2023	31 May 2023	Bobby Thomas	Burnley	Barnsley
14 January 2023	31 May 2023	Jake Young	Bradford City	Barrow
16 January 2023	31 May 2023	Tolaji Bola	Rotherham United	Bradford City
16 January 2023	31 May 2023	(Scotland) Logan Chalmers	(Scotland) Dundee United	Tranmere Rovers
16 January 2023	31 May 2023	Joseph Hungbo	Watford	Huddersfield Town
16 January 2023	31 May 2023	(Republic of Ireland) Tony Springett	Norwich City	Derby County
17 January 2023	31 May 2023	(Wales) Zac Ashworth	West Bromwich Albion	Burton Albion
17 January 2023	31 May 2023	(Republic of Ireland) James Brown	Blackburn Rovers	Doncaster Rovers
17 January 2023	31 May 2023	Matty Foulds	Bradford City	Harrogate Town
17 January 2023	31 May 2023	(Scotland) Jamie McCart	Rotherham United	Leyton Orient
17 January 2023	31 May 2023	Ben Nelson	Leicester City	Doncaster Rovers
18 January 2023	31 May 2023	James Beadle	Brighton & Hove Albion	Crewe Alexandra
18 January 2023	31 May 2023	Ryan Finnigan	Southampton	Crewe Alexandra
18 January 2023	31 May 2023	Jasper Moon	Barnsley	Burton Albion
19 January 2023	31 May 2023	(Indonesia) Elkan Baggott	Ipswich Town	Cheltenham Town
19 January 2023	31 May 2023	Ellery Balcombe	Brentford	Bristol Rovers
19 January 2023	31 May 2023	Malcolm Ebiowei	Crystal Palace	Hull City
19 January 2023	31 May 2023	(Scotland) Michael Mellon	Burnley	Morecambe
19 January 2023	31 May 2023	Shola Shoretire	Manchester United	Bolton Wanderers
20 January 2023	31 May 2023	(Ghana) Tariqe Fosu	Brentford	Rotherham United
20 January 2023	31 May 2023	(Portugal) Gonçalo Guedes	Wolverhampton Wanderers	(Portugal) Benfica
20 January 2023	31 May 2023	Matt Macey	Luton Town	Portsmouth
20 January 2023	31 May 2023	Jarell Quansah	Liverpool	Bristol Rovers
20 January 2023	31 May 2023	(Northern Ireland) Dale Taylor	Nottingham Forest	Burton Albion
20 January 2023	31 May 2023	(New Zealand) Chris Wood	Newcastle United	Nottingham Forest
23 January 2023	31 May 2023	(Portugal) Henrique Araújo	(Portugal) Benfica	Watford
23 January 2023	31 May 2023	(Northern Ireland) Aaron Donnelly	Nottingham Forest	Port Vale
23 January 2023	31 May 2023	Charlie Goode	Brentford	Blackpool
23 January 2023	31 May 2023	Paris Maghoma	Brentford	Milton Keynes Dons
23 January 2023	31 May 2023	(France) Morgan Sanson	Aston Villa	(France) Strasbourg
23 January 2023	31 May 2023	(Poland) Jakub Stolarczyk	Leicester City	Hartlepool United
24 January 2023	31 January 2023	(Iceland) Jökull Andrésson	Reading	Exeter City
24 January 2023	31 May 2023	(The Gambia) Saikou Janneh	Cambridge United	AFC Wimbledon
24 January 2023	31 May 2023	(Scotland) Conor McGrandles	Charlton Athletic	Cambridge United
24 January 2023	31 May 2023	Josh Stones	Wigan Athletic	(Scotland) Ross County
24 January 2023	31 May 2023	(Nigeria) William Troost-Ekong	Watford	(Italy) Salernitana
25 January 2023	31 May 2023	(Netherlands) Arnaut Danjuma	(Spain) Villarreal	Tottenham Hotspur
25 January 2023	31 May 2023	(Montenegro) Matija Sarkic	Wolverhampton Wanderers	Stoke City
25 January 2023	31 May 2023	(Wales) Sorba Thomas	Huddersfield Town	Blackburn Rovers
26 January 2023	31 May 2023	Harvey Cartwright	Hull City	Wycombe Wanderers
26 January 2023	31 May 2023	(Kosovo) Bersant Celina	(France) Dijon	Stoke City
26 January 2023	31 May 2023	(Republic of Ireland) Conor Coventry	West Ham United	Rotherham United
26 January 2023	31 May 2023	(Germany) Leon Dajaku	Sunderland	(Switzerland) St. Gallen
26 January 2023	31 May 2023	Cody Drameh	Leeds United	Luton Town
26 January 2023	31 May 2023	Tom Eastman	Colchester United	Harrogate Town
26 January 2023	31 May 2023	(Republic of Ireland) Will Hondermarck	Barnsley	Northampton Town
26 January 2023	31 May 2023	(Republic of Ireland) Conor Masterson	Queens Park Rangers	Gillingham
26 January 2023	31 May 2023	(Republic of Ireland) Luke McNally	Burnley	Coventry City
26 January 2023	31 May 2023	(Cameroon) Yann Songo'o	Bradford City	Walsall
27 January 2023	31 May 2023	(Wales) Matt Baker	Stoke City	(Wales) Newport County
27 January 2023	31 May 2023	Matthew Dennis	Milton Keynes Dons	Sutton United
27 January 2023	31 May 2023	Owen Dodgson	Burnley	Rochdale
27 January 2023	31 May 2023	Aden Flint	Stoke City	Sheffield Wednesday
27 January 2023	31 May 2023	Joe Gelhardt	Leeds United	Sunderland
27 January 2023	31 May 2023	(Netherlands) Ki-Jana Hoever	Wolverhampton Wanderers	Stoke City
27 January 2023	31 May 2023	Charlie Lakin	Burton Albion	Doncaster Rovers
27 January 2023	31 May 2023	D'Mani Mellor	Wycombe Wanderers	Rochdale
27 January 2023	31 May 2023	Tyler Onyango	Everton	Forest Green Rovers
27 January 2023	31 May 2023	(Republic of Ireland) Kieran Sadlier	Bolton Wanderers	Leyton Orient
27 January 2023	31 May 2023	(Wales) Charlie Savage	Manchester United	Forest Green Rovers
27 January 2023	31 May 2023	Jackson Smith	Wolverhampton Wanderers	Walsall
27 January 2023	31 May 2023	(Cyprus) Tayt Trusty	Blackpool	Hartlepool United
29 January 2023	31 May 2023	(France) Malo Gusto	Chelsea	(France) Lyon
29 January 2023	31 May 2023	Luke McGee	Forest Green Rovers	Derby County
29 January 2023	31 May 2023	(Republic of Ireland) Michael Obafemi	(Wales) Swansea City	Burnley
29 January 2023	31 May 2023	Mattie Pollock	Watford	(Scotland) Aberdeen
29 January 2023	31 May 2023	(Brazil) Tetê	(Ukraine) Shakhtar Donetsk	Leicester City
30 January 2023	31 May 2023	Louie Barry	Aston Villa	Salford City
30 January 2023	31 May 2023	(Ivory Coast) Vakoun Issouf Bayo	Watford	(Belgium) Charleroi
30 January 2023	31 May 2023	(Scotland) Oliver Burke	(Germany) Werder Bremen	Millwall
30 January 2023	31 May 2023	(Wales) Chem Campbell	Wolverhampton Wanderers	Wycombe Wanderers
30 January 2023	31 May 2023	(Italy) Cesare Casadei	Chelsea	Reading
30 January 2023	31 May 2023	Luke Chambers	Liverpool	(Scotland) Kilmarnock
30 January 2023	31 May 2023	CJ Egan-Riley	Burnley	(Scotland) Hibernian
30 January 2023	31 May 2023	(Spain) Bryan Gil	Tottenham Hotspur	(Spain) Sevilla
30 January 2023	31 May 2023	Harry Isted	Luton Town	Barnsley
30 January 2023	31 May 2023	Martin Kelly	West Bromwich Albion	Wigan Athletic
30 January 2023	31 May 2023	(France) Ateef Konaté	Nottingham Forest	Oxford United
30 January 2023	31 May 2023	(France) Han-Noah Massengo	Bristol City	(France) Auxerre
30 January 2023	31 May 2023	(United States) Weston McKennie	(Italy) Juventus	Leeds United
30 January 2023	31 May 2023	Tom Smith	Arsenal	Colchester United
30 January 2023	31 May 2023	(Uruguay) Matías Viña	(Italy) Roma	AFC Bournemouth
31 January 2023	31 May 2023	Tristan Abrahams	Eastleigh	Gillingham
31 January 2023	31 May 2023	Daniel Adshead	Cheltenham Town	Rochdale
31 January 2023	31 May 2023	(Belgium) Enock Agyei	Burnley	(Belgium) KV Mechelen
31 January 2023	31 May 2023	(Spain) Gassan Ahadme	Ipswich Town	Burton Albion
31 January 2023	31 May 2023	Marc Albrighton	Leicester City	West Bromwich Albion
31 January 2023	31 May 2023	(Iceland) Jökull Andrésson	Reading	Stevenage
31 January 2023	31 May 2023	Josh Austerfield	Huddersfield Town	Morecambe
31 January 2023	31 May 2023	(Uganda) Giosue Bellagambi	Huddersfield Town	Salford City
31 January 2023	31 May 2023	Di'Shon Bernard	Manchester United	Portsmouth
31 January 2023	31 May 2023	(Netherlands) Lamare Bogarde	Aston Villa	Bristol Rovers
31 January 2023	31 May 2023	Nathan Butler-Oyedeji	Arsenal	Accrington Stanley
31 January 2023	31 May 2023	(Portugal) João Cancelo	Manchester City	(Germany) Bayern Munich
31 January 2023	31 May 2023	(Peru) Yuriel Celi	Hull City	(Peru) Universitario
31 January 2023	31 May 2023	(Jamaica) Jahmari Clarke	Reading	Forest Green Rovers
31 January 2023	31 May 2023	(France) Julien Dacosta	Coventry City	(France) Nancy
31 January 2023	31 May 2023	Karl Darlow	Newcastle United	Hull City
31 January 2023	31 May 2023	Tyla Dickinson	Wycombe Wanderers	Sutton United
31 January 2023	31 May 2023	(Scotland) Tom Dickson-Peters	Norwich City	Grimsby Town
31 January 2023	31 May 2023	Taylor Foran	Arsenal	Hartlepool United
31 January 2023	31 May 2023	(Scotland) Regan Hendry	Forest Green Rovers	Tranmere Rovers
31 January 2023	31 May 2023	(United States) Matthew Hoppe	Middlesbrough	(Scotland) Hibernian
31 January 2023	31 May 2023	Diallang Jaiyesimi	Charlton Athletic	AFC Wimbledon
31 January 2023	31 May 2023	Dylan Kadji	Bristol City	Swindon Town
31 January 2023	31 May 2023	Dan Kemp	Milton Keynes Dons	Hartlepool United
31 January 2023	31 May 2023	(Republic of Ireland) Gavin Kilkenny	AFC Bournemouth	Charlton Athletic
31 January 2023	31 May 2023	Charlie Kirk	Charlton Athletic	Burton Albion
31 January 2023	31 May 2023	(Scotland) Samuel Lavelle	Charlton Athletic	Burton Albion
31 January 2023	31 May 2023	(Spain) Diego Llorente	Leeds United	(Italy) Roma
31 January 2023	31 May 2023	George Lloyd	Cheltenham Town	Grimsby Town
31 January 2023	31 May 2023	(Brazil) Marquinhos	Arsenal	Norwich City
31 January 2023	31 May 2023	Luke Mbete	Manchester City	Bolton Wanderers
31 January 2023	31 May 2023	Kasey McAteer	Leicester City	AFC Wimbledon
31 January 2023	31 May 2023	Charlie McNeill	Manchester United	(Wales) Newport County
31 January 2023	31 May 2023	(Zimbabwe) Marvelous Nakamba	Aston Villa	Luton Town
31 January 2023	31 May 2023	(Costa Rica) Keylor Navas	(France) Paris Saint-Germain	Nottingham Forest
31 January 2023	31 May 2023	(Republic of Ireland) Corrie Ndaba	Ipswich Town	Fleetwood Town
31 January 2023	31 May 2023	(Republic of Ireland) Aiden O'Brien	Shrewsbury Town	Gillingham
31 January 2023	31 May 2023	(Belgium) Kazeem Olaigbe	Southampton	Harrogate Town
31 January 2023	31 May 2023	(Ghana) Nathan Opoku	Leicester City	(Belgium) OH Leuven
31 January 2023	31 May 2023	Ben Pearson	AFC Bournemouth	Stoke City
31 January 2023	31 May 2023	(Spain) Pedro Porro	(Portugal) Sporting CP	Tottenham Hotspur
31 January 2023	31 May 2023	(Portugal) Domingos Quina	Watford	Rotherham United
31 January 2023	31 May 2023	Aaron Ramsey	Aston Villa	Middlesbrough
31 January 2023	31 May 2023	(Republic of Ireland) Glen Rea	Luton Town	Cheltenham Town
31 January 2023	31 May 2023	(Scotland) Josh Reid	Coventry City	Stevenage
31 January 2023	31 May 2023	(Tunisia) Omar Rekik	Arsenal	Wigan Athletic
31 January 2023	31 May 2023	Sean Robertson	Forest Green Rovers	Crewe Alexandra
31 January 2023	31 May 2023	Aaron Rowe	Huddersfield Town	Stockport County
31 January 2023	31 May 2023	(Austria) Marcel Sabitzer	(Germany) Bayern Munich	Manchester United
31 January 2023	31 May 2023	(Belgium) Albert Sambi Lokonga	Arsenal	Crystal Palace
31 January 2023	31 May 2023	Ryan Schofield	Huddersfield Town	Crawley Town
31 January 2023	31 May 2023	(Luxembourg) Danel Sinani	Norwich City	Wigan Athletic
31 January 2023	31 May 2023	Thierry Small	Southampton	(Scotland) St Mirren
31 January 2023	31 May 2023	Tyler Smith	Hull City	Oxford United
31 January 2023	31 May 2023	Djed Spence	Tottenham Hotspur	(France) Rennes
31 January 2023	31 May 2023	Jack Spong	Brighton & Hove Albion	Crawley Town
31 January 2023	31 May 2023	Matty Stevens	Forest Green Rovers	Walsall
31 January 2023	31 May 2023	Anthony Stewart	(Scotland) Aberdeen	Milton Keynes Dons
31 January 2023	31 May 2023	Matty Taylor	Oxford United	Port Vale
31 January 2023	31 May 2023	Joe Tomlinson	Peterborough United	Swindon Town
31 January 2023	31 May 2023	(Ivory Coast) Hamed Traorè	(Italy) Sassuolo	AFC Bournemouth
31 January 2023	31 May 2023	Kabongo Tshimanga	Chesterfield	Peterborough United
31 January 2023	31 May 2023	Axel Tuanzebe	Manchester United	Stoke City
31 January 2023	31 May 2023	Jay Turner-Cooke	Newcastle United	Tranmere Rovers
31 January 2023	31 May 2023	Harvey White	Tottenham Hotspur	Derby County
31 January 2023	31 May 2023	(Australia) Bailey Wright	Sunderland	Rotherham United
31 January 2023	31 May 2023	D'Margio Wright-Phillips	Stoke City	Northampton Town
31 January 2023	31 May 2023	(Australia) Tete Yengi	Ipswich Town	Northampton Town
