= Taofeek Ismaheel =

Nigerian footballer (born 2000)

Personal information
- Full name: Taofeek Ajibade Ismaheel
- Date of birth: 16 July 2000 (age 26)
- Place of birth: Lagos, Nigeria
- Height: 1.72 m (5 ft 8 in)
- Position: Winger

Team information
- Current team: Qarabağ
- Number: 19

Senior career*
Years	Team	Apps	(Gls)
–2019	HB Abuja		
2019–2020	Skeid	34	(6)
2021	Fredrikstad	30	(13)
2022–2024	Lorient	0	(0)
2022	→ Vålerenga (loan)	9	(0)
2022–2024	→ Beveren (loan)	51	(7)
2024–2026	Górnik Zabrze	40	(3)
2025–2026	→ Lech Poznań (loan)	21	(1)
2026–	Qarabağ	1	(0)
- * Club domestic league appearances and goals as of 12:04, 5 September 2026 (UTC)

Taofeek Ajibade Ismaheel (born 16 July 2000) is a Nigerian professional footballer who plays as a winger for Azerbaijan Premier League club Qarabağ.

== Career ==
Ismaheel started his career with Norwegian second tier side Skeid, where he suffered relegation to the Norwegian third tier. On 9 November 2020, he joined Fredrikstad, signing a three-year contract. Before the second half of 2021–22, Ismaheel signed for Lorient in the Ligue 1. Before the 2022 season, he was sent on loan to Norwegian club Vålerenga. On 2 April 2022, he debuted for Vålerenga in a 1–0 loss to Molde.

On 10 August 2022, Ismaheel moved on loan to Beveren in the Belgian second tier.

On 17 July 2024, Ismaheel moved to Polish Ekstraklasa club Górnik Zabrze on a three-year contract, for an undisclosed fee.

On 1 September 2025, Ismaheel joined fellow Ekstraklasa club Lech Poznań on a season-long loan, with an option to make the move permanent. He scored four goals and made five assists in all competitions as Lech won the 2025–26 Ekstraklasa and reached the UEFA Conference League round of 16. He returned to Górnik after the season concluded.

On 27 August 2026, Ismaheel moved to Azerbaijani club Qarabağ for a reported fee of €1 million.

== Career statistics ==
As of match played 31 August 2026

Appearances and goals by club, season and competition
Club	Season	League			National cup (Note: Includes Norwegian Cup, Belgian Cup, Polish Cup)		Europe		Other		Total	
Club	Season	Division	Apps	Goals	Apps	Goals	Apps	Goals	Apps	Goals	Apps	Goals
Skeid	2019	First Division	16	0	1	0	—		—		17	0
Skeid	2020	Second Division	18	6	—		—		2 (Note: Appearances in Second Division promotion play-offs)	0	20	6
Skeid	Total		34	6	1	0	—		2	0	37	6
Fredrikstad	2021	First Division	30	13	2	0	—		1 (Note: Appearance in First Division promotion play-offs)	0	33	13
Vålerenga (loan)	2022	Eliteserien	9	0	3	1	—		—		12	1
Beveren (loan)	2022–23	Challenger Pro League	21	1	2	1	—		—		23	2
Beveren (loan)	2023–24	Challenger Pro League	30	6	3	0	—		—		33	6
Beveren (loan)	Total		51	7	5	1	—		—		56	8
Górnik Zabrze	2024–25	Ekstraklasa	31	3	1	0	—		—		32	3
Górnik Zabrze	2025–26	Ekstraklasa	7	0	—		—		—		7	0
Górnik Zabrze	2026–27	Ekstraklasa	2	0	—		3 (Note: One appearance in UEFA Champions League, two appearances in UEFA Europa League)	0	1 (Note: Appearance in Polish Super Cup)	0	6	0
Górnik Zabrze	Total		40	3	1	0	3	0	1	0	45	3
Lech Poznań (loan)	2025–26	Ekstraklasa	21	1	3	0	10 (Note: Appearances in UEFA Conference League)	3	—		34	4
Qarabağ	2026–27	Azerbaijan Premier League	1	0	0	0	—		—		1	0
Career total			186	30	15	2	13	3	4	0	218	35

== Honours ==
Lech Poznań

- Ekstraklasa: 2025–26

Individual

- Norwegian First Division Young Player of the Month: September 2021
- Norwegian First Division Young Player of the Year: 2021
