= Renaldo Cephas =

Jamaican footballer

Personal information
- Full name: Renaldo Showayne Cephas
- Date of birth: 8 December 1999 (age 26)
- Place of birth: Kingston, Jamaica
- Height: 1.79 m (5 ft 10 in)
- Position: Winger

Team information
- Current team: Qarabağ
- Number: 29

Youth career
- Allman/Woodford
- 2018–2019: Molynes United

Senior career*
Years	Team	Apps	(Gls)
2019–2022	Arnett Gardens	37	(12)
2022–2023	Shkupi	29	(11)
2023–2025	Ankaragücü	58	(11)
2025–2026	Pari Nizhny Novgorod	25	(1)
2026–	Qarabağ	4	(2)

International career^{‡}
2023–	Jamaica	31	(5)
Medal record
Men's football
Representing Jamaica
CONCACAF Nations League
Bronze medal – third place	2024 United States	Team
- * Club domestic league appearances and goals as of 18 September 2026 ‡ National team caps and goals as of 14 November 2026

Renaldo Showayne Cephas (born 8 December 1999) is a Jamaican professional footballer who plays as a winger for Azerbaijani club Qarabağ and the Jamaica national team.

== Club career ==
Cephas is a youth product of the Jamaican clubs Allman/Woodford FC and Molynes United, and began his senior career with Arnett Gardens in the Jamaican National Premier League in 2019. On 6 July 2022, he moved to the Macedonian club Shkupi, and in his debut season with them scored 11 goals in 29 league games. In July 2022, he scored 4 goals for Shkupi in a 5–0 Europa Conference League win over FC Hegelmann on 14 June 2023. On 8 August 2023, he transferred to the Turkish Süper Lig club Ankaragücü.

On 25 July 2025, Cephas signed a three-year contract with Pari Nizhny Novgorod in the Russian Premier League.

On June 25, 2026, Sefas transferred to Qarabağ, a club competing in the Azerbaijan Premier League. Renaldo Sefas signed a three-year contract with Qarabağ, the biggest and most successful club in Azerbaijan.

The footballer's debut and first goal for Qarabağ in official matches took place in the first qualifying round of the 2026–27 UEFA Europa League. On July 9, 2026, in a match against the Icelandic club Vestri, Sefas scored a goal in the 86th minute following an assist from Zakaria Sawo.

== International career ==
On 2 September 2023, Cephas received his first call-up to the Jamaica national team for a set of 2023–24 CONCACAF Nations League matches. He made his debut in the first match against Honduras on 8 September.

== Career statistics ==
=== Club ===
As of match played 18 September 2026

Appearances and goals by club, season and competition
Club	Season	League			National cup (Note: Includes Turkish Cup)		Continental		Total	
Club	Season	Division	Apps	Goals	Apps	Goals	Apps	Goals	Apps	Goals
Arnett Gardens	2018–19	Jamaica Premier League	7	0	—		—		7	0
Arnett Gardens	2019–20	Jamaica Premier League	2	0	—		—		2	0
Arnett Gardens	2021	Jamaica Premier League	7	2	—		—		7	2
Arnett Gardens	2022	Jamaica Premier League	21	10	—		—		21	10
Arnett Gardens	Total		37	12	—		—		37	12
Shkupi	2022–23	Macedonian First Football League	29	11	—		7 (Note: Four appearances in UEFA Champions League, one appearance in UEFA Europa League, two appearances in UEFA Conference League)	1	36	12
Shkupi	2023–24	Macedonian First Football League	—		—		4 (Note: Appearances in UEFA Conference League)	4	4	4
Shkupi	Total		29	11	—		11	5	40	16
Ankaragücü	2023–24	Süper Lig	31	3	4	0	—		35	3
Ankaragücü	2024–25	TFF 1. Lig	27	8	5	3	—		32	11
Ankaragücü	Total		58	11	9	3	—		67	14
Pari Nizhny Novgorod	2025–26	Russian Premier League	25	1	4	0	—		29	1
Qarabağ	2026–27	Azerbaijan Premier League	4	2	0	0	6 (Note: Four appearances and one goal in UEFA Europa League, two apeparances in UEFA Conference League)	1	10	3
Career Total			153	37	13	3	17	6	183	46

=== International ===
As of match played 14 November 2026

Appearances and goals by national team and year
National team	Year	Apps	Goals
Jamaica	2023	1	0
Jamaica	2024	11	0
Jamaica	2025	15	3
Jamaica	2026	4	2
Total		31	5

Scores and results list Jamaica's goal tally first, score column indicates score after each Cephas goal.

List of international goals scored by Renaldo Cephas
No.	Date	Venue	Opponent	Score	Result	Competition
1	25 March 2025	Sabina Park, Kingston, Jamaica	Saint Vincent and the Grenadines	3–0	3–0	2026 FIFA World Cup qualification
2	6 September 2025	Bermuda National Stadium, Hamilton, Bermuda	Bermuda	2–0	4–0	2026 FIFA World Cup qualification
3	14 November 2025	Hasely Crawford Stadium, Port of Spain, Trinidad and Tobago	Trinidad and Tobago	1–0	1–1	2026 FIFA World Cup qualification
4	25 September 2026	Independence Park, Kingston, Jamaica	Guatemala	3–2	3–2	2026–27 CONCACAF Nations League A
5	14 November 2026	Independence Park, Kingston, Jamaica	Mexico	2–0	3–2	2026–27 CONCACAF Nations League A
