= Reda Khadra =

Footballer (born 2001)

Personal information
- Full name: Reda Khadra
- Date of birth: 4 July 2001 (age 25)
- Place of birth: Berlin, Germany
- Height: 1.80 m (5 ft 11 in)
- Positions: Attacking midfielder; winger

Team information
- Current team: Qarabağ
- Number: 10

Youth career
- CFC Hertha 06
- –2016: TeBe Berlin
- 2016–2020: Borussia Dortmund
- 2020–2021: Brighton & Hove Albion

Senior career*
Years	Team	Apps	(Gls)
2020	Borussia Dortmund II	1	(0)
2021–2023	Brighton & Hove Albion	1	(0)
2021–2022	→ Blackburn Rovers (loan)	27	(4)
2022–2023	→ Sheffield United (loan)	15	(1)
2023	→ Birmingham City (loan)	14	(3)
2023–2026	Reims	34	(1)
2025–2026	→ Le Havre (loan)	8	(0)
2026–	Qarabağ	5	(0)

International career^{‡}
2018–2019	Germany U18	3	(0)
2022	Germany U21	3	(0)
2026–	Lebanon	2	(0)
- * Club domestic league appearances and goals as of 6 November 2026 ‡ National team caps and goals as of 17 November 2026

Reda Khadra (Arabic: رضا خضرة; born 4 July 2001) is a professional footballer who plays as an attacking midfielder or winger for Azerbaijan Premier League club Qarabağ. Born in Germany, he plays for the Lebanon national team.

A youth product of Borussia Dortmund, Khadra moved to Brighton & Hove Albion in 2020 and made his Premier League debut in 2021. He was loaned to three Championship clubs: Blackburn Rovers in the 2021–22 season, followed by Sheffield United and Birmingham City in the 2022–23 season. In the summer of 2023, Khadra signed for Ligue 1 side Reims, and spent the 2025–26 season on loan at Le Havre. He moved to Azerbaijan in 2026, signing for Qarabağ.

Khadra represented Germany internationally at youth level between 2018 and 2022, before switching allegiance to Lebanon in 2026.

== Early life ==
Originally from Tyre, Lebanon, Khadra's parents, Issam and Aluna, fled the country due to the ongoing civil war (1975–1990) and settled in Berlin, Germany. Khadra's two older sisters were born in Lebanon, while he and his brother were born in Berlin.

== Club career ==
=== Borussia Dortmund ===
Khadra played youth football for CFC Hertha 06 and TeBe Berlin, before joining Borussia Dortmund's youth sector in 2016. In 2017–18 Khadra played 11 games for the under-17 team, helping them win the Under 17 Bundesliga. In 2018–19 he was promoted to the under-19 team, playing 20 games in the Under 19 Bundesliga, and helping his team win the league title. Khadra also participated in the 2018–19 UEFA Youth League, playing six games. On 9 June 2019, Khadra played for the senior team in a friendly game against Energie Cottbus, scoring the first goal in a 5–0 win.

During the 2019–20 season, he contributed to nine goals in 25 games for the under-19 team, and made an appearance for the reserve team in the Regionalliga West, in a 2–0 away defeat to Rödinghausen on 7 March 2020. Khadra played six games in the 2019–20 UEFA Youth League. Between 2016 and 2020, Khadra played 69 youth team matches for Borussia Dortmund, scoring two goals and providing 11 assists. He was released in June 2020.

=== Brighton & Hove Albion ===
On 1 October 2020, Khadra moved to Premier League club Brighton & Hove Albion, joining their under-23 team. He made his debut for the U23s on 3 October 2020, scoring the match opener in a 3–2 away win against West Ham United. On 13 January 2021, Khadra made his Premier League debut, coming on in the 86th minute in a 1–0 away defeat to Manchester City. He picked up an injury in early February, and was ruled out for the rest of the season. Khadra signed a new contract on 13 April, until June 2023.

==== Loan to Blackburn Rovers ====
On 31 August 2021, Khadra joined EFL Championship club Blackburn Rovers on a season-long loan deal. He made his debut on 14 September, coming on as a 54th-minute substitute for John Buckley in the 2–0 home victory over Hull City. Khadra scored the first senior goal of his career on 6 November, the equaliser in a 3–1 home win over Sheffield United. He scored his second goal for Rovers three weeks later in a 1–0 away win over Stoke City. Khadra scored on his FA Cup debut on 8 January 2022, putting his side 1–0 up in an eventual 3–2 third round loss to local rivals Wigan Athletic.

He had played 27 league games for Rovers, before being ruled out for the rest of a season due to a calf injury he picked up against Reading on 19 March.

==== Loans to Sheffield United and Birmingham City ====
On 26 July 2022, Khadra joined fellow Championship club Sheffield United on loan for the 2022–23 season. He scored his only goal for United on 13 September, helping his side win 1–0 against Swansea City. However, because Sheffield United's formation of choice did not include wingers, Khadra was used out of position and infrequently, and by the January transfer window, he had requested and been granted an early termination of his loan. Shortly afterwards, a transfer embargo was imposed on the club, whose manager Paul Heckingbottom said later that had he known he would be unable to sign a replacement, he might well have refused to release Khadra.

Khadra returned to Brighton, signed a contract extension until June 2024, and joined another Championship club, Birmingham City, on 10 January 2023 on loan for the rest of the season. He marked his debut with a goal away to Bristol City four days later, in a 4–2 defeat. Away to Swansea City in February, he was fouled for a penalty, converted by Scott Hogan, but Birmingham went 3–2 down, only to come back to win 4–3. Khadra injured a hamstring during the game, and was out for a month. In what remained of the season, he scored twice, in a 2–0 win against fellow relegation candidate Rotherham United and the only goal against Blackburn Rovers, his former loan club, and set up the goal for Lukas Jutkiewicz at Millwall that confirmed Birmingham's Championship status for the 2023–24 season.

=== Reims ===
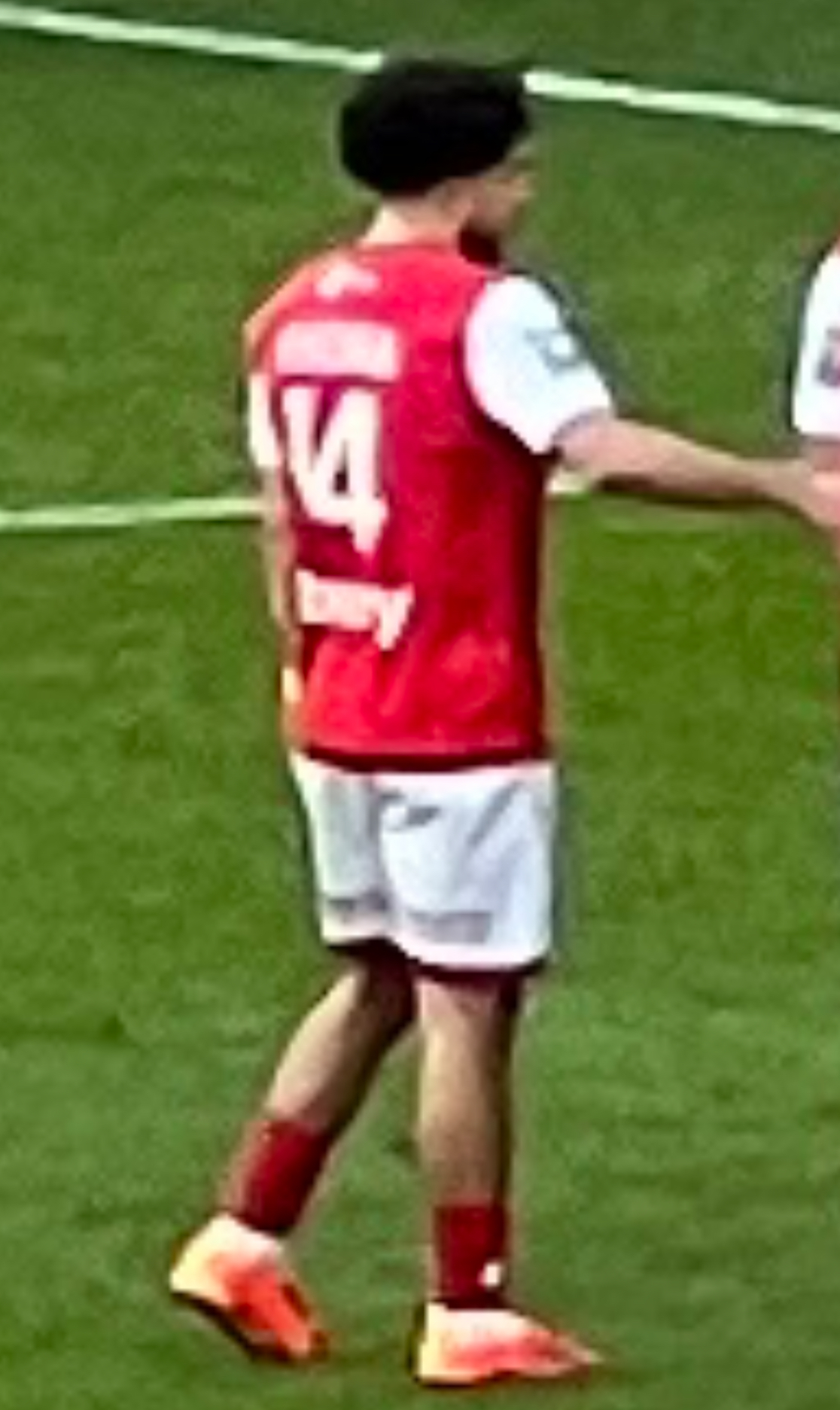
Khadra with Reims in 2024

On 21 July 2023, Khadra signed with Ligue 1 side Stade de Reims on undisclosed terms. On 21 September 2024, during a league match against Paris Saint-Germain, he sustained a knee injury and was subsequently substituted. Medical examinations confirmed an anterior cruciate ligament injury in his left knee – the same knee previously injured during his time at Brighton & Hove Albion in February 2021. The estimated recovery period was six to eight months.

==== Loan to Le Havre ====
On 2 September 2025, Khadra joined Ligue 1 club Le Havre on a season-long loan with an option to buy. He made his debut for Le Havre on 14 September 2025, coming on as a substitute in a 1–0 Ligue 1 defeat to Strasbourg. His first start came two weeks later, in a goalless draw against Metz. Khadra's season was again affected by fitness problems, including knee and shoulder injuries, and he made eight Ligue 1 appearances during the 2025–26 season.

=== Qarabağ ===
On 27 August 2026, Khadra joined Azerbaijan Premier League club Qarabağ on a two-year contract, with an option for a third year.

== International career ==
Born in Germany, Khadra is also eligible to represent Lebanon internationally through his parents, who are from Tyre.

=== Germany ===
Khadra represented Germany internationally at under-18 level three times between 2018 and 2019, in a friendly against Cyprus and two friendlies against France. He was called up to the under-21 squad for the first time in March 2022. However, Khadra withdrew from the camp due to an injury. He eventually made his under-21 debut on 23 September 2022, in a 1–0 friendly defeat to France.

=== Lebanon ===
Khadra was first called up to the Lebanon national team by head coach Madjid Bougherra in November 2026, ahead of the 2026 Basra Tournament matches against Iraq and Palestine. He made his debut on 13 November, starting against Iraq in a 0–0 draw before being substituted in the 38th minute after experiencing muscle discomfort.

== Style of play ==
Khadra is a versatile player who is capable of playing as an attacking midfielder or as a winger. His main characteristics are his pace, dribbling, and finishing.

== Career statistics ==
As of match played 6 November 2026

Appearances and goals by club, season and competition
Club	Season	League			National cup (Note: Includes FA Cup, Coupe de France)		League cup (Note: Includes EFL Cup)		Total	
Club	Season	Division	Apps	Goals	Apps	Goals	Apps	Goals	Apps	Goals
Borussia Dortmund II	2019–20	Regionalliga West	1	0	—		—		1	0
Brighton & Hove Albion	2020–21	Premier League	1	0	0	0	0	0	1	0
Brighton & Hove Albion	2021–22	Premier League	—		—		—		0	0
Brighton & Hove Albion	2022–23	Premier League	—		—		—		0	0
Brighton & Hove Albion	Total		1	0	0	0	0	0	1	0
Blackburn Rovers (loan)	2021–22	Championship	27	4	1	1	—		28	5
Sheffield United (loan)	2022–23	Championship	15	1	0	0	1	0	16	1
Birmingham City (loan)	2022–23	Championship	14	3	2	1	—		16	4
Reims	2023–24	Ligue 1	29	1	2	0	—		31	1
Reims	2024–25	Ligue 1	4	0	0	0	—		4	0
Reims	2025–26	Ligue 2	1	0	0	0	—		1	0
Reims	Total		34	1	2	0	0	0	36	1
Le Havre (loan)	2025–26	Ligue 1	8	0	0	0	—		8	0
Qarabağ	2026–27	Azerbaijan Premier League	5	0	0	0	—		5	0
Career total			104	9	5	2	1	0	110	11

=== International ===
As of match played 17 November 2026

Appearances and goals by national team and year
National team	Year	Apps	Goals
Lebanon	2026	2	0
Total		2	0

== Honours ==
Borussia Dortmund

- Under 19 Bundesliga: 2018–19
- Under 17 Bundesliga: 2017–18
- Under 17 Bundesliga West: 2017–18

== See also ==
- List of Lebanon international footballers born outside Lebanon
