= Samuel Lobato =

Portuguese footballer (born 2001)

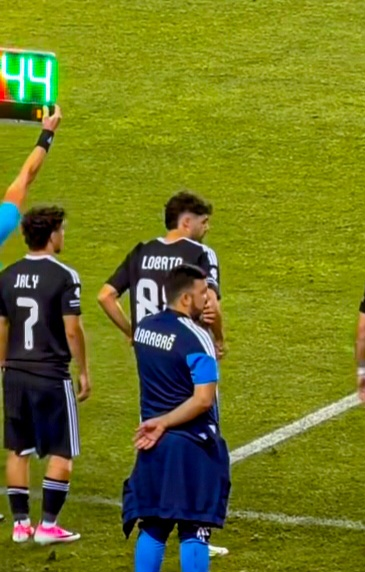
- Lobato in 2026 with Qarabağ

Personal information
- Full name: Samuel Gomes Lobato
- Date of birth: 19 October 2001 (age 25)
- Place of birth: Maia, Portugal
- Height: 1.84 m (6 ft 0 in)
- Position: Midfielder

Team information
- Current team: Qarabağ
- Number: 28

Youth career
- 2010–2011: ARDC Gondim-Maia
- 2011–2013: Boavista
- 2013–2024: Salgueiros
- 2014–2015: Leixões
- 2015–2021: Sporting CP
- 2021–2022: Famalicão

Senior career*
Years	Team	Apps	(Gls)
2022–2025	Famalicão	12	(0)
2022–2023	→ B-SAD (loan)	19	(0)
2024	→ Tondela (loan)	6	(0)
2025–2026	Portimonense	29	(2)
2026–	Qarabağ	0	(0)
- * Club domestic league appearances and goals as of 21 June 2026

Samuel Gomes Lobato (born 19 October 2001) is a Portuguese professional football player who plays as midfielder for Azerbaijan Premier League club Qarabağ.

== Career ==
Lobato is a product of the youth academies of ARDC Gondim-Maia, Boavista, Salgueiros, Leixões, and Sporting CP. On 20 August 2019, he signed his first professional contract with Sporting CP. In 2021 he transferred to Famalicão where he played with their U23s. On 5 July 2022, he signed his first professional contract with Famalicão until 2026. On 1 September 2022, he joined B-SAD in a season-long loan in the Liga Portugal 2. He returned to Famalicão's U23s the following season, before joining Tondela on loan on 8 January 2024, again in the second division for the second half of the 2023–24 season.

On 2 July 2025, Lobato joined Liga Portugal 2 club Portimonense, signing a three-year contract.

On 16 June 2026, Lobato joined Azerbaijan Premier League club Qarabağ FK, signing a three-year contract.

== International career ==
In September 2017, Lobato was called up to the Portugal U17s for a training camp.
