= Jaly Mouaddib =

French footballer (born 2000)

Personal information
- Date of birth: 18 November 2000 (age 25)
- Place of birth: Lens, France
- Height: 1.73 m (5 ft 8 in)
- Position: Winger

Team information
- Current team: Qarabağ
- Number: 7

Youth career
- 2006–2010: AG Caennaise
- 2010–2017: Caen
- 2017–2018: Lille

Senior career*
Years	Team	Apps	(Gls)
2018–2020	Lille B	14	(4)
2020–2023	Angers B	28	(6)
2021–2022	→ Avranches (loan)	16	(2)
2021–2022	→ Avranches B (loan)	9	(4)
2023–2025	Botoșani	47	(3)
2025–2026	Omonia Aradippou	30	(4)
2026–	Qarabağ	10	(3)

International career
2019	France U19	1	(1)
- * Club domestic league appearances and goals as of 22 March 2026

Jaly Mouaddib (born 18 November 2000) is a French professional footballer who plays as a winger for Azerbaijan Premier League club Qarabağ.

== Career ==
=== Botoșani ===
On 8 August 2023, Mouaddib signed for Romanian Liga I club Botoșani on a contract until the summer of 2026.

=== Qarabağ ===
On 18 May 2026, Azerbaijan Premier League club Qarabağ announced the signing of Mouaddib for the 2026–27 season, on a contract until the summer of 2029.

== Personal life ==
Jaly's brother, Jad, is also a former footballer.
