= Zakaria Sawo =

Swedish footballer (born 1999)

Personal information
- Full name: Zakaria Sarjo Sawo
- Date of birth: 11 January 2000 (age 26)
- Place of birth: Sweden
- Height: 1.85 m (6 ft 1 in)
- Position: Striker

Team information
- Current team: Qarabağ

Youth career
- –2012: Oxie IF
- 2013–2015: Malmö FF
- 2016: BK Olympic
- 2017: Landskrona BoIS

Senior career*
Years	Team	Apps	(Gls)
2018	BK Olympic	8	(1)
2018–2020	FC Rosengård	39	(6)
2021–2022	Oskarshamns AIK	42	(13)
2022–2023	IK Start	21	(8)
2023–2025	Aris Limassol	43	(10)
2025–2026	Djurgårdens IF	18	(1)
2026	→ AEL Limassol (loan)	18	(9)
2026–	Qarabağ	0	(0)
- * Club domestic league appearances and goals as of 15 May 2026

Zakaria Sarjo Sawo (born 11 January 2000) is a Swedish footballer who plays as a striker for Qarabağ.

== Early life ==
Sawo was born in 2000 in Sweden. He is a native of Oxie, Sweden. He was born to a Gambian father and Swedish mother.

== Career ==
Sawo started his career with Swedish side BK Olympic. After that, he signed for Swedish side FC Rosengård 1917. In 2021, he signed for Swedish side Oskarshamns AIK. In 2022, he signed for Norwegian side IK Start. In 2023, he signed for Cypriot side Aris Limassol FC. In 2025, he signed for Djurgårdens IF.

On 24 May 2026, Azerbaijan Premier League club Qarabağ announced the signing of Sawo from Djurgården on a contract until the summer of 2029.

== Style of play ==
Sawo mainly operates as a striker. He is known for his speed.
