= 2008 UEFA European Under-17 Championship squads =

Football tournament squads

Below are the rosters for the UEFA U-17 Championship 2008 tournament in Turkey. Players name marked in bold went on to earn full international caps.

Players' ages as of the tournament's opening day (4 May 2008).

== Group A ==
=== Netherlands ===
Head coach: Albert Stuivenberg

No.	Pos.	Player	Date of birth (age)	Caps	Goals	Club
1	GK	**Jeroen Zoet**	6 January 1991 (age 17)			(Royal Dutch Football Association) PSV Eindhoven
2	DF	Tim Eekman	5 August 1991 (age 16)			(Royal Dutch Football Association) Feyenoord
3	DF	Imad Najah	19 February 1991 (age 17)			(Royal Dutch Football Association) PSV Eindhoven
4	DF	**Ricardo van Rhijn**	13 June 1991 (age 16)			(Royal Dutch Football Association) Ajax
5	DF	Lorenzo Burnet	25 May 1991 (age 16)			(Royal Dutch Football Association) Ajax
6	MF	Ricky van Haaren	21 June 1991 (age 16)			(Royal Dutch Football Association) Feyenoord
7	FW	Rajiv van La Parra	4 June 1991 (age 16)			(Royal Dutch Football Association) Feyenoord
8	MF	**Jordy Clasie**	27 June 1991 (age 16)			(Royal Dutch Football Association) Feyenoord
9	FW	Geoffrey Castillion	25 May 1991 (age 17)			(Royal Dutch Football Association) Ajax
10	MF	Rodney Sneijder	31 March 1991 (age 17)			(Royal Dutch Football Association) Ajax
11	FW	Jerson Cabral	3 January 1991 (age 17)			(Royal Dutch Football Association) Feyenoord
12	DF	**Roly Bonevacia**	8 October 1991 (age 16)			(Royal Dutch Football Association) Ajax
13	DF	Dico Koppers	31 January 1992 (age 15)			(Royal Dutch Football Association) Ajax
14	MF	Youness Mokhtar	29 August 1991 (age 16)			(Royal Dutch Football Association) PSV Eindhoven
15	MF	Lorenzo Ebecilio	24 September 1991 (age 16)			(Royal Dutch Football Association) Ajax
16	GK	Fons Mulder	5 April 1991 (age 17)			(Royal Dutch Football Association) Utrecht
17	DF	Jeffrey Gouweleeuw	10 July 1991 (age 16)			(Royal Dutch Football Association) Heerenveen
18	MF	**Oğuzhan Özyakup**	23 September 1992 (age 15)			(The Football Association) Arsenal

=== Serbia ===
Head coach: Dejan Đurđević

No.	Pos.	Player	Date of birth (age)	Caps	Goals	Club
1	GK	Vilson Caković	22 February 1991 (aged 17)			(Football Association of Serbia) Balkan Mirijevo
2	DF	Zlatko Liščević	8 March 1991 (aged 17)			(Football Association of Serbia) Red Star Belgrade
3	DF	**Milan Rodić**	2 April 1991 (aged 17)			(Football Association of Serbia) OFK Beograd
4	MF	Nebojša Gavrilović	3 February 1991 (aged 17)			(Football Association of Serbia) Partizan
5	DF	Milan Milanović	31 March 1991 (aged 17)			(Russian Football Union) Lokomotiv Moscow
6	MF	Goran Brkić	28 April 1991 (aged 17)			(Football Association of Serbia) OFK Beograd
7	DF	**Aleksandar Ignjovski**	27 January 1991 (aged 17)			(Football Association of Serbia) OFK Beograd
8	MF	Predrag Stevanović	3 March 1991 (aged 17)			(German Football Association) Schalke 04
9	MF	Vuk Mitošević	12 February 1991 (aged 17)			(Football Association of Serbia) Vojvodina
10	FW	**Adem Ljajić**	22 September 1991 (aged 16)			(Football Association of Serbia) Partizan
11	FW	**Danijel Aleksić**	30 April 1991 (aged 17)			(Football Association of Serbia) Vojvodina
12	GK	Marko Nikolić	2 January 1991 (aged 17)			(Football Association of Serbia) Partizan
13	FW	Marko Obradović	30 June 1991 (aged 16)			(Football Association of Serbia) Zemun
14	MF	**Luka Milivojević**	7 April 1991 (aged 17)			(Football Association of Serbia) Radnički Kragujevac
15	MF	**Nemanja Gudelj**	16 November 1991 (aged 16)			(Royal Dutch Football Association) NAC Breda
16	DF	Stevan Smederevac	5 January 1991 (aged 17)			(Football Association of Serbia) OFK Beograd
17	DF	Nenad Stjepić	1 February 1991 (aged 17)			(Football Association of Serbia) OFK Beograd
18	FW	Marko Rajić	30 July 1991 (aged 16)			(Football Association of Serbia) Zemun

=== Scotland ===
Head coach: Ross Mathie

No.	Pos.	Player	Date of birth (age)	Caps	Goals	Club
1	GK	Grant Adam	16 April 1991 (age 17)			(Scottish Football Association) Rangers
2	DF	Stephen Forbes	21 February 1991 (age 17)			(Scottish Football Association) Rangers
3	DF	Michael Deland	6 January 1991 (age 17)			(Scottish Football Association) Heart of Midlothian
4	DF	Scott Durie	11 November 1991 (age 16)			(Scottish Football Association) Rangers
5	DF	**Liam Cooper**	3 August 1991 (age 16)			(The Football Association) Hull City
6	MF	Jamie Ness	2 March 1991 (age 17)			(Scottish Football Association) Rangers
7	MF	Paul Slane	25 November 1991 (age 16)			(Scottish Football Association) Motherwell
8	MF	Gordon Smith	14 January 1991 (age 17)			(Scottish Football Association) Livingston
9	FW	Archie Campbell	10 January 1991 (age 17)			(Scottish Football Association) Rangers
10	MF	**John Fleck**	24 August 1991 (age 16)			(Scottish Football Association) Rangers
11	FW	Bob McHugh	16 July 1991 (age 16)			(Scottish Football Association) Motherwell
12	GK	James Wood	10 November 1991 (age 16)			(The Football Association) Manchester City
13	MF	Danny Thomson	24 February 1991 (age 16)			(Scottish Football Association) Heart of Midlothian
14	MF	Alex Cooper	8 May 1991 (age 16)			(The Football Association) Liverpool
15	FW	Scott Robinson	12 March 1992 (age 16)			(Scottish Football Association) Heart of Midlothian
16	FW	James Keatings	20 January 1992 (age 16)			(Scottish Football Association) Celtic
17	DF	David McAuliffe	20 June 1991 (age 16)			(Scottish Football Association) Motherwell
18	MF	Peter Innes	26 April 1991 (age 17)			(Scottish Football Association) Motherwell

=== Turkey ===
Head coach: Şenol Ustaömer

No.	Pos.	Player	Date of birth (age)	Caps	Goals	Club
1	GK	Metin Uçar	7 April 1991 (age 17)			(Turkish Football Federation) Gençlerbirliği
2	DF	Erhan Karayer	3 August 1991 (age 16)			(Turkish Football Federation) Çanakkale Dardanelspor
3	DF	Özgür Çek	3 January 1991 (age 17)			(Turkish Football Federation) Fenerbahçe
4	DF	Sertaç Eren	20 December 1991 (age 16)			(Turkish Football Federation) Fenerbahçe
5	DF	Emrah Yollu	3 November 1991 (age 16)			(Turkish Football Federation) Galatasaray
6	MF	Abdülkadir Kayalı	30 January 1991 (age 17)			(Turkish Football Federation) Ankaragücü
7	MF	Öztürk Karataş	15 February 1991 (age 17)			(German Football Association) Karlsruher SC
8	MF	**Soner Aydoğdu**	5 January 1991 (age 17)			(Turkish Football Federation) Gençlerbirliği
9	FW	**Batuhan Karadeniz**	24 April 1991 (age 17)			(Turkish Football Federation) Beşiktaş
10	MF	**Gökhan Töre**	20 January 1992 (age 16)			(German Football Association) Bayer Leverkusen
11	MF	Eren Albayrak	23 April 1991 (age 17)			(Turkish Football Federation) Bursaspor
12	GK	Umutcan Yüksel	1 January 1992 (age 16)			(Turkish Football Federation) Ankaragücü
13	DF	Volkan Dikmen	14 November 1991 (age 16)			(German Football Association) Hertha BSC
14	DF	Berk Neziroğluları	3 January 1991 (age 17)			(Turkish Football Federation) Galatasaray
15	MF	Sefer Sever	1 January 1991 (age 17)			(Turkish Football Federation) Fenerbahçe
16	DF	**Barış Yardımcı**	14 August 1992 (age 15)			(Turkish Football Federation) Fenerbahçe
17	FW	**Muhammet Demir**	10 January 1992 (age 16)			(Turkish Football Federation) Bursaspor
18	MF	**Emre Çolak**	20 May 1991 (age 16)			(Turkish Football Federation) Galatasaray

== Group B ==
=== France ===
Head coach: Francis Smerecki

No.	Pos.	Player	Date of birth (age)	Caps	Goals	Club
1	GK	Jeffrey Baltus	20 December 1991 (age 16)			(French Football Federation) Auxerre
2	DF	Joël Adegoroye	15 May 1991 (age 16)			(French Football Federation) Rennes
3	MF	André Auras	22 April 1991 (age 17)			(French Football Federation) Auxerre
4	DF	William Rémy	4 April 1991 (age 17)			(French Football Federation) Lens
5	DF	Sébastien Faure	3 January 1991 (age 17)			(French Football Federation) Lyon
6	MF	Loïc Damour	8 January 1991 (age 17)			(French Football Federation) Strasbourg
7	FW	**Gaël Kakuta**	21 June 1991 (age 16)			(The Football Association) Chelsea
8	MF	Gueïda Fofana	16 May 1991 (age 16)			(French Football Federation) Le Havre
9	MF	Enzo Reale	7 October 1991 (age 16)			(French Football Federation) Lyon
10	FW	**Gilles Sunu**	31 March 1991 (age 17)			(The Football Association) Arsenal
11	FW	Yannis Salibur	24 January 1991 (age 17)			(French Football Federation) Lille
12	FW	**Alexandre Lacazette**	28 May 1991 (age 16)			(French Football Federation) Lyon
13	DF	**Loïc Négo**	15 January 1991 (age 17)			(French Football Federation) Nantes
14	DF	Timothée Kolodziejczak	1 October 1991 (age 16)			(French Football Federation) Lens
15	DF	**Willy Boly**	3 February 1991 (age 17)			(French Football Federation) Auxerre
16	GK	**Anthony Mfa Mezui**	7 March 1991 (age 17)			(French Football Federation) Metz
17	FW	**Clément Grenier**	7 January 1991 (age 17)			(French Football Federation) Lyon
18	FW	Yannis Tafer	11 February 1991 (age 17)			(French Football Federation) Lyon

=== Republic of Ireland ===
Head coach: Sean McCaffrey

No.	Pos.	Player	Date of birth (age)	Caps	Goals	Club
1	GK	Gerard Hanley	4 April 1991 (age 17)			(Football Association of Ireland) Galway United
2	DF	Pádraic Ormsby	8 January 1991 (age 17)			(Football Association of Ireland) Crumlin United
3	DF	Gavin Gunning	26 January 1991 (age 17)			(The Football Association) Blackburn Rovers
4	DF	John Dunleavy	3 July 1991 (age 16)			(The Football Association) Wolverhampton Wanderers
5	DF	Mark Connolly	16 December 1991 (age 16)			(The Football Association) Wolverhampton Wanderers
6	FW	Gearóid Morrissey	17 November 1991 (age 16)			(Football Association of Ireland) Ringmahon Rangers
7	MF	Aaron Doran	13 May 1991 (age 16)			(The Football Association) Blackburn Rovers
8	MF	Conor Clifford	1 October 1991 (age 16)			(The Football Association) Chelsea
9	MF	**Greg Cunningham**	31 January 1991 (age 17)			(The Football Association) Manchester City
10	MF	**Conor Hourihane**	2 February 1991 (age 17)			(The Football Association) Sunderland
11	FW	Paul Murphy	19 March 1991 (age 17)			(The Football Association) Ipswich Town
12	FW	**Robbie Brady**	14 January 1992 (age 16)			(The Football Association) Manchester United
13	FW	Darragh Satelle	22 February 1991 (age 17)			(The Football Association) Hull City
14	DF	Daniel Joyce	5 June 1992 (age 15)			(Football Association of Ireland) Belvedere
15	MF	John Sullivan	6 January 1991 (age 17)			(Football Association of Ireland) Crumlin United
16	GK	Gavin Carlin	18 March 1991 (age 17)			(The Football Association) West Bromwich Albion
17	DF	Richie Towell	17 July 1991 (age 16)			(Scottish Football Association) Celtic
18	DF	Shaun Timmins	13 March 1991 (age 17)			(The Football Association) Birmingham City

=== Spain ===
Head coach: Juan Santisteban

No.	Pos.	Player	Date of birth (age)	Caps	Goals	Club
1	GK	Ángel Díez	9 January 1991 (age 17)			(Royal Spanish Football Federation) Racing Santander
2	DF	Martín Montoya	14 April 1991 (age 17)			(Royal Spanish Football Federation) Barcelona
3	DF	Ángel Martínez	17 May 1991 (age 16)			(Royal Spanish Football Federation) Espanyol
4	DF	Jon Gaztañaga	28 June 1991 (age 16)			(Royal Spanish Football Federation) Real Sociedad
5	MF	Oriol Romeu	24 September 1991 (age 16)			(Royal Spanish Football Federation) Barcelona
6	MF	Álvaro López	27 June 1991 (age 16)			(Royal Spanish Football Federation) Real Madrid
7	MF	Keko	27 December 1991 (age 16)			(Royal Spanish Football Federation) Atlético Madrid
8	FW	**Thiago**	11 April 1991 (age 17)			(Royal Spanish Football Federation) Barcelona
9	FW	Rubén Rochina	23 March 1991 (age 17)			(Royal Spanish Football Federation) Barcelona
10	MF	**Sergio Canales**	16 February 1991 (age 17)			(Royal Spanish Football Federation) Racing Santander
11	FW	Manu Gavilán	12 July 1991 (age 16)			(Royal Spanish Football Federation) Real Betis
12	DF	Jorge Pulido	8 April 1991 (age 17)			(Royal Spanish Football Federation) Atlético Madrid
13	GK	Álex Sánchez	3 February 1991 (age 17)			(Royal Spanish Football Federation) Barcelona
14	FW	Gerardo Bruna	29 January 1991 (age 17)			(The Football Association) Liverpool
15	DF	Carles Planas	4 March 1991 (age 17)			(Royal Spanish Football Federation) Barcelona
16	FW	Sergi	20 January 1991 (age 17)			(Royal Spanish Football Federation) Valencia
17	MF	Óscar Sielva	6 August 1991 (age 16)			(Royal Spanish Football Federation) Espanyol
18	MF	Adrià Carmona	8 February 1992 (age 16)			(Royal Spanish Football Federation) Barcelona

=== Switzerland ===
Head coach: Yves Débonnaire

No.	Pos.	Player	Date of birth (age)	Caps	Goals	Club
1	GK	René Borković	21 April 1991 (aged 17)			(Swiss Football Association) Zürich
2	DF	Bigambo Rochat	29 May 1991 (aged 16)			(Swiss Football Association) Lausanne-Sport
3	DF	Fabio Daprelà	19 February 1991 (aged 17)			(Swiss Football Association) Grasshopper
4	DF	Philippe Koch	8 February 1991 (aged 17)			(Swiss Football Association) Zürich
5	DF	**Michael Lang**	8 February 1991 (aged 17)			(Swiss Football Association) St. Gallen
6	MF	**Steven Ukoh**	19 June 1991 (aged 16)			(Swiss Football Association) Young Boys
7	MF	David Frey	8 February 1991 (aged 17)			(Swiss Football Association) Thun
8	MF	**Taulant Xhaka**	28 March 1991 (aged 17)			(Swiss Football Association) Basel
9	FW	**Nassim Ben Khalifa**	13 January 1992 (aged 16)			(Swiss Football Association) Lausanne-Sport
10	FW	**Admir Mehmedi**	16 March 1991 (aged 17)			(Swiss Football Association) Zürich
11	MF	Alexandre Pasche	31 May 1991 (aged 16)			(Swiss Football Association) Lausanne-Sport
12	GK	Hrvoje Bukovski	5 November 1991 (aged 16)			(German Football Association) SC Freiburg
13	DF	Patrick Dürig	28 January 1991 (aged 17)			(Swiss Football Association) Young Boys
14	DF	Fisnik Sabedini	4 November 1991 (aged 16)			(Swiss Football Association) Zürich
15	MF	**Xherdan Shaqiri**	10 October 1991 (aged 16)			(Swiss Football Association) Basel
16	MF	Stefano Milani	13 January 1991 (aged 17)			(Swiss Football Association) Lugano
17	FW	Dino Rebronja	12 June 1991 (aged 16)			(Swiss Football Association) Young Boys
18	FW	Sven Lehmann	18 December 1991 (aged 16)			(Swiss Football Association) St. Gallen
