= 2021–22 Lech Poznań season =

Lech Poznań
2021–22 season
- Chairman: Karol Klimczak; Piotr Rutkowski
- Manager: Maciej Skorża
- Stadium: Stadion Miejski
- Ekstraklasa: 1st
- Polish Cup: Runners-up
- Top goalscorer: League: Mikael Ishak (18 goals); All: Mikael Ishak (18 goals)
- Highest home attendance: Ekstraklasa: 41,008 vs. Zagłębie Lubin (21 May 2022)
- Lowest home attendance: Polish Cup: 3,622 vs. Skra (28 September 2021)
- Average home league attendance: 22,559
- Biggest win: Ekstraklasa: Lech 5–0 Wisła K. (17 September 2021); Lech 5–0 Termalica (12 February 2022)
- Biggest defeat: Ekstraklasa: Jagiellonia 1–0 Lech (24 September 2021); Radomiak 2–1 Lech (11 December 2021); Lechia 1–0 Lech (20 February 2022); Lech 0–1 Raków (6 March 2022)
Home colours	Away colours
- All statistics correct as of 22 May 2022.

Lech Poznań is a Polish football club based in Poznań. This was their 99th season overall. They competed in Ekstraklasa, the highest ranking league in Poland.

Due to COVID-19 pandemic in Poland the number of spectators was limited and controlled by the Polish government. Starting from 26 June 2021, the number of spectators of Ekstraklasa and Polish Cup competitions could reach at maximum 50% of stadium capacity.

== Club ==
=== Coaching staff ===
Position	Staff
Coach	(Poland) Maciej Skorża
Assistant coach	(Poland) Rafał Janas
Assistant coach	(Poland) Maciej Kędziorek
Assistant coach/Analyst	(Poland) Wojciech Makowski
Assistant coach	(Poland) Dariusz Dudka
Goalkeeping coach	(Poland) Maciej Palczewski
Fitness coach	(Czech Republic) Antonin Čepek
Fitness coach	(Poland) Karol Kikut
Match analyst	(Poland) Hubert Barański
Team Doctor	(Poland) Krzysztof Pawlaczyk
Team Doctor	(Poland) Paweł Cybulski
Team Doctor	(Poland) Andrzej Pyda
Team Doctor	(Poland) Damian Bartkiewicz
Physiotherapist	(Poland) Maciej Łopatka
Physiotherapist	(Poland) Marcin Lis
Physiotherapist	(Poland) Maciej Smuniewski
Physiotherapist	(Poland) Paweł Tota
Dietician	(Poland) Patryk Wiśniewski
Team Manager	(Poland) Mariusz Skrzypczak
Kit Manager	(Poland) Sławomir Mizgalski
Cook	(Poland) Artur Dzierzbicki

Source: Lech Poznań

=== Management ===
Position	Staff
Chairman	(Poland) Karol Klimczak
Chairman	(Poland) Piotr Rutkowski
Sporting director	(Poland) Tomasz Rząsa

Source: Lech Poznań

== Current squad ==
As of 22 May 2022.

Note: Flags indicate national team as defined under FIFA eligibility rules; some limited exceptions apply. Players may hold more than one non-FIFA nationality.

No.	Pos.	Nation	Player
1	GK	NED	Mickey van der Hart
2	DF	POR	Joel Pereira
3	DF	SCO	Barry Douglas
4	DF	POL	Tomasz Kędziora (on loan from (Ukraine) Dynamo Kyiv)
5	DF	POR	Pedro Rebocho
6	MF	SWE	Jesper Karlström
7	MF	POL	Jakub Kamiński
9	FW	SWE	Mikael Ishak (Captain)
10	MF	ESP	Dani Ramírez
11	MF	POL	Filip Marchwiński
16	DF	CRO	Antonio Milić
17	FW	POL	Filip Wilak
18	DF	POL	Bartosz Salamon
19	FW	POL	Norbert Pacławski
20	DF	POL	Maksymilian Pingot
21	MF	POL	Michał Skóraś

No.	Pos.	Nation	Player
22	MF	POL	Radosław Murawski
23	MF	NOR	Kristoffer Velde
24	MF	POR	João Amaral
25	MF	POR	Pedro Tiba (Vice-captain)
27	MF	POL	Mateusz Skrzypczak
30	MF	GEO	Nika Kvekveskiri
34	MF	POL	Tymoteusz Klupś
35	GK	POL	Filip Bednarek
37	DF	SVK	Ľubomír Šatka
44	DF	POL	Alan Czerwiński
50	MF	CIV	Adriel Ba Loua
74	MF	POL	Jakub Antczak
90	FW	POL	Artur Sobiech
97	FW	POL	Dawid Kownacki (on loan from (Germany) Fortuna Düsseldorf)
99	GK	POL	Miłosz Mleczko

=== Out on loan ===
Note: Flags indicate national team as defined under FIFA eligibility rules; some limited exceptions apply. Players may hold more than one non-FIFA nationality.

No.	Pos.	Nation	Player
8	MF	CZE	Jan Sýkora (at (Czech Republic) Viktoria Plzeň until the end of 2021–22 season)
15	MF	CRO	Karlo Muhar (at (Bulgaria) CSKA Sofia until the end of 2021–22 season)
28	DF	POL	Filip Borowski (at Zagłębie Sosnowiec until the end of 2022–23 season)
31	GK	POL	Krzysztof Bąkowski (at Stomil Olsztyn until the end of 2021–22 season)

No.	Pos.	Nation	Player
33	GK	POL	Bartosz Mrozek (at Stal Mielec until the end of 2021–22 season)
43	MF	POL	Antoni Kozubal (at Górnik Polkowice until the end of 2021–22 season)
—	MF	POL	Juliusz Letniowski (at Widzew Łódź until the end of 2021–22 season)
—	FW	POL	Filip Szymczak (at GKS Katowice until the end of 2021–22 season)

== Transfer ==
=== Summer transfer window ===
==== In ====
No.	Pos.	Nat.	Name	Age	EU	Moving from	Type	Transfer window	Ends	Transfer fee	Source
24	MF	(Portugal)	João Amaral	29	EU	(Portugal) Paços de Ferreira	Loan return	Summer	2022	Free	
50	MF	(Ivory Coast)	Adriel Ba Loua	25	Non-EU	(Czech Republic) Viktoria Plzeň	Transfer	Summer	2025	€1,200,000	
88	FW	(Croatia)	Roko Baturina	21	EU	(Hungary) Ferencváros	Loan	Summer	2022	Free	
5	DF	(Serbia)	Đorđe Crnomarković	27	Non-EU	Zagłębie Lubin	Loan return	Summer	2022	Free	
3	DF	(Scotland)	Barry Douglas	31	Non-EU	(England) Leeds United	Transfer	Summer	2023	Free	
38	MF	(Poland)	Jakub Karbownik	20	EU		Transfer	Summer	2023	Youth system	
	MF	(Poland)	Juliusz Letniowski	23	EU	Arka Gdynia	Loan return	Summer	2022	Free	
99	GK	(Poland)	Miłosz Mleczko	22	EU	Widzew Łódź	Loan return	Summer	2023	Free	
33	GK	(Poland)	Bartosz Mrozek	21	EU	GKS Katowice	Loan return	Summer	2022	Free	
15	MF	(Croatia)	Karlo Muhar	25	EU	(Turkey) Kayserispor	Loan return	Summer	2023	Free	
22	MF	(Poland)	Radosław Murawski	27	EU	(Turkey) Denizlispor	Transfer	Summer	2024	Free	
	MF	(Poland)	Łukasz Norkowski	21	EU	GKS Tychy	Loan return	Summer	2021	Free	
2	DF	(Portugal)	Joel Pereira	24	EU	(Cyprus) Omonia	Transfer	Summer	2025	€100,000	
5	DF	(Portugal)	Pedro Rebocho	26	EU	(France) Guingamp	Transfer	Summer	2023	Undisclosed	
27	MF	(Poland)	Mateusz Skrzypczak	20	EU	Puszcza Niepołomice	Loan return	Summer	2022	Free	
90	FW	(Poland)	Artur Sobiech	31	EU	(Turkey) Karagümrük	Transfer	Summer	2023	Free	

Total spending: ▼€1,300,000

==== Out ====
No.	Pos.	Nat.	Name	Age	EU	Moving to	Type	Transfer window	Transfer fee	Source
31	GK	(Poland)	Krzysztof Bąkowski	18	EU	Stomil Olsztyn	Loan	Summer	Free	
5	DF	(Serbia)	Đorđe Crnomarković	27	Non-EU	(Slovenia) Olimpija Ljubljana	Transfer	Summer	Undisclosed	
13	DF	(Poland)	Tomasz Dejewski	26	EU		End of contract	Summer	Free	
20	FW	(United States)	Aron Jóhannsson	30	Non-EU		Mutual consent	Summer	Free	
14	FW	(Georgia (country))	Nika Kacharava	27	Non-EU	(Cyprus) Anorthosis Famagusta	End of loan	Summer	Free	
3	DF	(Ukraine)	Vasyl Kravets	23	Non-EU	(Spain) Leganés	End of loan	Summer	Free	
	MF	(Poland)	Juliusz Letniowski	23	EU	Widzew Łódź	Loan	Summer	Free	
15	MF	(Croatia)	Karlo Muhar	25	EU	(Bulgaria) CSKA Sofia	Loan	Summer	Free	
27	DF	(Poland)	Tymoteusz Puchacz	22	EU	(Germany) Union Berlin	Transfer	Summer	€2,500,000	
51	FW	(Poland)	Hubert Sobol	21	EU	Wisła Kraków	End of contract	Summer	Free	
8	MF	(Czech Republic)	Jan Sýkora	27	EU	(Czech Republic) Viktoria Plzeň	Loan	Summer	Free	
23	FW	(Poland)	Filip Szymczak	19	EU	GKS Katowice	Loan	Summer	Free	

Total income: ▲€2,500,000

Total expenditure: ▲€1,200,000

=== Winter transfer window ===
==== In ====
No.	Pos.	Nat.	Name	Age	EU	Moving from	Type	Transfer window	Ends	Transfer fee	Source
74	MF	(Poland)	Jakub Antczak	17	EU		Transfer	Winter	2024	Youth system	
4	DF	(Poland)	Tomasz Kędziora	27	EU	(Ukraine) Dynamo Kyiv	Loan	Winter	2022	Free	
97	FW	(Poland)	Dawid Kownacki	24	EU	(Germany) Fortuna Düsseldorf	Loan	Winter	2022	Free	
	DF	(Poland)	Jakub Niewiadomski	19	EU	GKS Jastrzębie	Loan return	Winter	2022	Free	
20	DF	(Poland)	Maksymilian Pingot	18	EU		Transfer	Winter	2024	Youth system	
23	MF	(Norway)	Kristoffer Velde	22	Non-EU	(Norway) Haugesund	Transfer	Winter	2025	€1,100,000	

Total spending: ▼€1,100,000

==== Out ====
No.	Pos.	Nat.	Name	Age	EU	Moving to	Type	Transfer window	Transfer fee	Source
88	FW	(Croatia)	Roko Baturina	21	EU	(Hungary) Ferencváros	End of loan	Winter	Free	
28	DF	(Poland)	Filip Borowski	18	EU	Zagłębie Sosnowiec	Loan	Winter	Free	
38	MF	(Poland)	Jakub Karbownik	20	EU	GKS Katowice	Transfer	Winter	Undisclosed	
43	MF	(Poland)	Antoni Kozubal	17	EU	Górnik Polkowice	Loan	Winter	Free	
4	DF	(Norway)	Thomas Rogne	31	Non-EU	(Greece) Apollon Smyrnis	End of contract	Winter	Free	

Total income: €0

Total expenditure: ▼€1,100,000

== Friendlies ==
Win Draw Loss

30 June 2021 Club friendly	Lech Poznań	3–1	Zagłębie Lubin	Opalenica
17:00 CEST (UTC+02:00)	Forenc 23' (o.g.); Amaral 28'; Ramírez 80'	90minut Official website	Živec 83' (pen.)	Stadium: Stadion Miejski; Attendance: 0

3 July 2021 Club friendly	Lech Poznań	0–1	Lechia Gdańsk	Poznań
15:00 CEST (UTC+02:00)		90minut Official website	Durmuş 22'	Stadium: Stadion Miejski

7 July 2021 Club friendly	Lech Poznań	3–2	(Denmark) Midtjylland	Poznań
17:00 CEST (UTC+02:00)	Ishak 31' (pen.); Kozubal 74'; Marchwiński 80'	90minut Official website	Høegh 61'; Nicolaisen 87'	Stadium: Stadion Miejski

9 July 2021 Club friendly	Lech Poznań	0–2	Arka Gdynia	Opalenica
16:00 CEST (UTC+02:00)		90minut Official website	Vinicius 12'; Wolsztyński 67'	Stadium: Stadion Miejski

16 July 2021 Club friendly	Lech Poznań	4–0	Miedź Legnica	Poznań
17:00 CEST (UTC+02:00)	Kamiński; Sobiech; Ramírez	90minut		Stadium: Lech Poznań training ground Attendance: 0

4 September 2021 Club friendly	Lech Poznań	2–1	Zagłębie Lubin	Opalenica
12:30 CEST (UTC+02:00)	Karbownik 88', 90'	90minut	Daniel 40'	Stadium: Stadion Miejski; Attendance: 0

9 October 2021 Club friendly	Lech Poznań	5–1	ŁKS Łódź	Poznań
13:00 CEST (UTC+02:00)	Sobiech; Baturina; Kozubal	90minut	Ibe-Torti 58'	Stadium: Lech Poznań training ground Attendance: 0

15 January 2022 Club friendly	Lech Poznań	4–2	(Czech Republic) Baník Ostrava	Belek, Turkey
15:00 CET (UTC+01:00)	Ramírez 27'; Ba Loua 30'; Marchwiński 77'; Kvekveskiri 80' (pen.)	90minut Official website	Jaroň 59' (pen.); Klíma 67'	Stadium: Susesi Sport Center

18 January 2022 Club friendly	Lech Poznań	4–1	(North Macedonia) Shkupi	Belek, Turkey
15:00 CET (UTC+01:00)	Kvekveskiri 34'; Milić 38'; Marchwiński 54'; Czekała 75'	90minut Official website	Radeski 69'	Stadium: Susesi Sport Center

20 January 2022 Club friendly	Lech Poznań	1–2	(Georgia (country)) Dinamo Batumi	Belek, Turkey
15:30 CET (UTC+01:00)	Ramírez 14' (pen.)	90minut Official website	Mamuchashvili 45' (pen.); Gaprindashvili 59'	Stadium: Susesi Sport Center

22 January 2022 Club friendly	Lech Poznań	4–1	(Slovenia) Mura	Belek, Turkey
15:30 CET (UTC+01:00)	Amaral 21', 63'; Kamiński 25'; Marchwiński 58'	90minut Official website	Horvat 34'	Stadium: Susesi Sport Center

28 January 2022 Club friendly	Hertha BSC (Germany)	2–4	Lech Poznań	Berlin, Germany
12:00 CET (UTC+01:00)	Darida 32'; Gechter 80'	90minut	Amaral 6', 66' (pen.); Kamiński 11'; Milić 73'	Stadium: Hanns-Braun-Platz; Attendance: 0

29 January 2022 Club friendly	Lech Poznań	0–0	Miedź Legnica	Poznań
13:00 CET (UTC+01:00)		90minut		Stadium: Stadion Miejski; Attendance: 0

3 April 2022 Club friendly	Lech Poznań	3–3	Warta Poznań	Poznań
11:00 CET (UTC+01:00)	Kownacki 5'; Kopczyński 35' (o.g.); Amaral 85' (pen.)	90minut	Luís 42'; Corryn 47'; Castañeda 68'	Stadium: Stadion Miejski; Attendance: 0

== Competitions ==
Win Draw Loss

=== Overview ===
Competition	First match	Last match	Starting round	Final position	Record							
Competition	First match	Last match	Starting round	Final position	Pld	W	D	L	GF	GA	GD	Win %
Ekstraklasa	23 July 2021	22 May 2022	Matchday 1	1st	34	22	8	4	67	24	+43	64.71
Polish Cup	28 September 2021	2 May 2022	Round of 64	Runners-up	6	5	0	1	15	3	+12	83.33
Total					40	27	8	5	82	27	+55	67.50

Last updated: 22 May 2022
Source: Competitions

=== Ekstraklasa ===
==== League table ====
Pos	Team	Pld	W	D	L	GF	GA	GD	Pts	Qualification or relegation
1	Lech Poznań (C)	34	22	8	4	67	24	+43	74	Qualification for the Champions League first qualifying round
2	Raków Częstochowa	34	20	9	5	60	30	+30	69	Qualification for the Europa Conference League second qualifying round
3	Pogoń Szczecin	34	18	11	5	63	31	+32	65	Qualification for the Europa Conference League first qualifying round (Note: Since the winners of the 2021–22 Polish Cup, Raków Częstochowa, qualified for the Europa Conference League based on league position, the second Europa Conference League first qualifying round berth was transferred to the 4th-placed team.)
4	Lechia Gdańsk	34	16	9	9	52	39	+13	57	Qualification for the Europa Conference League first qualifying round
5	Piast Gliwice	34	15	9	10	45	37	+8	54	

Source: ekstraklasa.org
Rules for classification: 1) Points; 2) Head-to-head points; 3) Head-to-head goal difference; 4) Goal difference; 5) Goals scored; 6) Number of wins; 7) Number of away wins; 8) Lower number of points based on yellow and red cards (red card = 3 points, yellow card = 1 point, sending-off = 3 points - including 1 point for first yellow card); 9) Fairplay ranking; 10) Draw. (Note: Head-to-head record is used only after all the matches between the teams in question have been played)
(C) Champions

==== Results summary ====
Overall								Home						Away					
Pld	W	D	L	GF	GA	GD	Pts	W	D	L	GF	GA	GD	W	D	L	GF	GA	GD
34	22	8	4	67	24	+43	74	13	3	1	40	7	+33	9	5	3	27	17	+10

Last updated: 22 May 2022.
Source: ekstraklasa.org 90minut.pl

==== Results by round ====
Round	1	2	3	4	5	6	7	8	9	10	11	12	13	14	15	16	17	18	19	20	21	22	23	24	25	26	27	28	29	30	31	32	33	34
Ground	H	A	H	A	H	H	A	H	A	H	A	H	A	A	H	H	A	A	H	A	H	A	A	H	A	H	A	H	A	H	H	A	A	H
Result	D	W	W	W	W	D	D	W	L	W	W	W	D	D	W	W	W	L	W	D	W	L	W	L	D	W	W	D	W	W	W	W	W	W
Position	13	3	1	1	1	1	1	1	1	1	1	1	1	1	1	1	1	1	1	1	1	2	1	3	3	3	3	1	1	2	2	1	1	1

Updated to match(es) played on 22 May 2022. Source: ekstraklasa.org 90minut.pl
A = Away; H = Home; W = Win; D = Draw; L = Loss; P = Postponed

==== Matches ====
Win Draw Loss

23 July 2021 Match 1	Lech Poznań	0–0	Radomiak Radom	Poznań
20:30 CEST (UTC+02:00)		Ekstraklasa; 90minut		Stadium: Stadion Miejski; Attendance: 10,177; Referee: Bartosz Frankowski (Toruń)

30 July 2021 Match 2	Górnik Zabrze	1–3	Lech Poznań	Zabrze
20:30 CEST (UTC+02:00)	Jiménez 8' (pen.)	Ekstraklasa; 90minut	Kamiński 38'; Ishak 49'; Skóraś 69'	Stadium: Stadion im. Ernesta Pohla; Attendance: 18,659; Referee: Szymon Marciniak (Płock)

6 August 2021 Match 3	Lech Poznań	2–0	Cracovia	Poznań
20:30 CEST (UTC+02:00)	Salamon 47'; Kamiński 54'	Ekstraklasa; 90minut		Stadium: Stadion Miejski; Attendance: 9,111; Referee: Damian Sylwestrzak (Wrocław)

13 August 2021 Match 4	Bruk-Bet Termalica Nieciecza	1–3	Lech Poznań	Nieciecza
18:00 CEST (UTC+02:00)	Wlazło 42' (pen.)	Ekstraklasa; 90minut	Douglas 3'; Amaral 4'; Ishak 81'	Stadium: Stadion Sportowy; Attendance: 4,323; Referee: Tomasz Wajda (Żywiec)

22 August 2021 Match 5	Lech Poznań	2–0	Lechia Gdańsk	Poznań
17:30 CEST (UTC+02:00)	Ishak 17'; Kvekveskiri 63'	Ekstraklasa; 90minut		Stadium: Stadion Miejski; Attendance: 14,652; Referee: Krzysztof Jakubik (Siedlce)

28 August 2021 Match 6	Lech Poznań	1–1	Pogoń Szczecin	Poznań
17:30 CEST (UTC+02:00)	Tiba 90+3'	Ekstraklasa; 90minut	Zahović 85'	Stadium: Stadion Miejski; Attendance: 17,611; Referee: Tomasz Musiał (Kraków)

12 September 2021 Match 7	Raków Częstochowa	2–2	Lech Poznań	Częstochowa
17:30 CEST (UTC+02:00)	Cebula 14' (pen.); Musiolik 48'	Ekstraklasa; 90minut	Amaral 57'; Ishak 73' (pen.)	Stadium: Stadion Miejski; Attendance: 5,200; Referee: Szymon Marciniak (Płock)

17 September 2021 Match 8	Lech Poznań	5–0	Wisła Kraków	Poznań
20:30 CEST (UTC+02:00)	Amaral 29'; Ba Loua 45+1'; Rebocho 52'; Ishak 60', 77' (pen.)	Ekstraklasa; 90minut		Stadium: Stadion Miejski; Attendance: 26,890; Referee: Tomasz Kwiatkowski (Warsaw)

24 September 2021 Match 9	Jagiellonia Białystok	1–0	Lech Poznań	Białystok
20:30 CEST (UTC+02:00)	Imaz 71'	Ekstraklasa; 90minut		Stadium: Stadion Miejski; Attendance: 6,779; Referee: Paweł Raczkowski (Warsaw)

2 October 2021 Match 10	Lech Poznań	4–0	Śląsk Wrocław	Poznań
17:30 CEST (UTC+02:00)	Amaral 2'; Kamiński 30', 54'; Ishak 56'	Ekstraklasa; 90minut		Stadium: Stadion Miejski; Attendance: 28,808; Referee: Bartosz Frankowski (Toruń)

17 October 2021 Match 11	Legia Warsaw	0–1	Lech Poznań	Warsaw
17:30 CEST (UTC+02:00)		Ekstraklasa; 90minut	Ishak 54'	Stadium: Stadion Wojska Polskiego; Attendance: 25,702; Referee: Tomasz Musiał (Kraków)

22 October 2021 Match 12	Lech Poznań	4–1	Wisła Płock	Poznań
20:30 CEST (UTC+02:00)	Salamon 14'; Murawski 53'; Kamiński 77'; Amaral 88'	Ekstraklasa; 90minut	Lagator 16'	Stadium: Stadion Miejski; Attendance: 20,077; Referee: Damian Sylwestrzak (Wrocław)

29 October 2021 Match 13	Stal Mielec	0–0	Lech Poznań	Mielec
20:30 CEST (UTC+02:00)		Ekstraklasa; 90minut		Stadium: Stadion Miejski; Attendance: 6,200; Referee: Paweł Raczkowski (Warsaw)

6 November 2021 Match 14	Górnik Łęczna	1–1	Lech Poznań	Łęczna
20:00 CET (UTC+01:00)	Gol 79'	Ekstraklasa; 90minut	Amaral 18'	Stadium: Stadion Miejski; Attendance: 4,528; Referee: Sebastian Krasny (Kraków)

20 November 2021 Match 15	Lech Poznań	1–0	Piast Gliwice	Poznań
20:00 CET (UTC+01:00)	Amaral 55'	Ekstraklasa; 90minut		Stadium: Stadion Miejski; Attendance: 18,055; Referee: Daniel Stefański (Bydgoszcz)

28 November 2021 Match 16	Lech Poznań	2–0	Warta Poznań	Poznań
15:00 CET (UTC+01:00)	Milić 53'; Ishak 64'	Ekstraklasa; 90minut		Stadium: Stadion Miejski; Attendance: 22,799; Referee: Paweł Raczkowski (Warsaw)

5 December 2021 Match 17	Zagłębie Lubin	2–3	Lech Poznań	Lubin
17:30 CET (UTC+01:00)	Kruk 49'; Šimić 59'	Ekstraklasa; 90minut	Milić 8'; Amaral 14'; Kamiński 53'	Stadium: Stadion Miejski; Attendance: 5,213; Referee: Damian Kos (Gdańsk)

11 December 2021 Match 18	Radomiak Radom	2–1	Lech Poznań	Radom
15:00 CET (UTC+01:00)	Angielski 16' (pen.); Maurides 30'	Ekstraklasa; 90minut	Ishak 77' (pen.)	Stadium: Stadion Miejski; Attendance: 4,491; Referee: Jarosław Przybył (Kluczbork)

19 December 2021 Match 19	Lech Poznań	2–1	Górnik Zabrze	Poznań
15:00 CET (UTC+01:00)	Kvekveskiri 44'; Milić 90+10'	Ekstraklasa; 90minut	Jiménez 36'	Stadium: Stadion Miejski; Attendance: 15,852; Referee: Jarosław Przybył (Kluczbork)

6 February 2022 Match 20	Cracovia	3–3	Lech Poznań	Kraków
17:30 CET (UTC+01:00)	Rakoczy 18'; Myszor 77'; Balaj 90'	Ekstraklasa; 90minut	Amaral 29', 67'; Kamiński 47'	Stadium: Stadion Miejski im. Józefa Piłsudskiego; Attendance: 7,126; Referee: Damian Sylwestrzak (Wrocław)

12 February 2022 Match 21	Lech Poznań	5–0	Bruk-Bet Termalica Nieciecza	Poznań
20:00 CET (UTC+01:00)	Ishak 18'; Kamiński 27'; Ramírez 44'; Salamon 55'; Kownacki 85'	Ekstraklasa; 90minut		Stadium: Stadion Miejski; Attendance: 13,151; Referee: Sebastian Jarzębak (Bytom)

20 February 2022 Match 22	Lechia Gdańsk	1–0	Lech Poznań	Gdańsk
17:30 CET (UTC+01:00)	Koperski 86'	Ekstraklasa; 90minut		Stadium: Polsat Plus Arena Gdańsk; Attendance: 11,002; Referee: Paweł Raczkowski (Warsaw)

26 February 2022 Match 23	Pogoń Szczecin	0–3	Lech Poznań	Szczecin
15:00 CET (UTC+01:00)		Ekstraklasa; 90minut	Ishak 70', 76' (pen.); Kownacki 72'	Stadium: Stadion Miejski im. Floriana Krygiera; Attendance: 9,138; Referee: Paweł Raczkowski (Warsaw)

6 March 2022 Match 24	Lech Poznań	0–1	Raków Częstochowa	Poznań
17:30 CET (UTC+01:00)		Ekstraklasa; 90minut	Ivi 50'	Stadium: Stadion Miejski; Attendance: 27,534; Referee: Damian Sylwestrzak (Wrocław)

13 March 2022 Match 25	Wisła Kraków	1–1	Lech Poznań	Kraków
17:30 CET (UTC+01:00)	Ondrášek 43'	Ekstraklasa; 90minut	Milić 90+8'	Stadium: Stadion Miejski im. Henryka Reymana; Attendance: 21,068; Referee: Tomasz Kwiatkowski (Warsaw)

19 March 2022 Match 26	Lech Poznań	3–0	Jagiellonia Białystok	Poznań
20:00 CET (UTC+01:00)	Ishak 47'; Amaral 53'; Kownacki 72'	Ekstraklasa; 90minut		Stadium: Stadion Miejski; Attendance: 40,072; Referee: Paweł Raczkowski (Warsaw)

1 April 2022 Match 27	Śląsk Wrocław	0–1	Lech Poznań	Wrocław
20:30 CEST (UTC+02:00)		Ekstraklasa; 90minut	Skóraś 48'	Stadium: Stadion Miejski; Attendance: 14,112; Referee: Krzysztof Jakubik (Siedlce)

9 April 2022 Match 28	Lech Poznań	1–1	Legia Warsaw	Poznań
17:30 CEST (UTC+02:00)	Šatka 30'	Ekstraklasa; 90minut	Lopes 40'	Stadium: Stadion Miejski; Attendance: 39,225; Referee: Damian Sylwestrzak (Wrocław)

16 April 2022 Match 29	Wisła Płock	0–1	Lech Poznań	Płock
20:00 CEST (UTC+02:00)		Ekstraklasa; 90minut	Kownacki 44'	Stadium: Stadion Miejski im. Kazimierza Górskiego; Attendance: 3,105; Referee: Paweł Raczkowski (Warsaw)

20 April 2022 Match 31	Lech Poznań	3–0	Górnik Łęczna	Poznań
18:00 CEST (UTC+02:00)	Amaral 4'; Karlström 26'; Ishak 44'	Ekstraklasa; 90minut		Stadium: Stadion Miejski; Attendance: 12,140; Referee: Sebastian Krasny (Kraków)
Note: Match originally scheduled on 29 April - 1 May 2022 was preponed by Ekstraklasa due to Lech Poznań's appearance in 2021–22 Polish Cup Final on 2 May 2022.

24 April 2022 Match 30	Lech Poznań	3–1	Stal Mielec	Poznań
12:30 CEST (UTC+02:00)	Amaral 12'; Ishak 31'; Żyro 49' (o.g.)	Ekstraklasa; 90minut	Steczyk 2'	Stadium: Stadion Miejski; Attendance: 26,352; Referee: Daniel Stefański (Bydgoszcz)

8 May 2022 Match 32	Piast Gliwice	1–2	Lech Poznań	Gliwice
17:30 CEST (UTC+02:00)	Kądzior 46'	Ekstraklasa; 90minut	Kamiński 16'; Ishak 87'	Stadium: Stadion Miejski; Attendance: 6,895; Referee: Paweł Raczkowski (Warsaw)

14 May 2022 Match 33	Warta Poznań	1–2	Lech Poznań	Grodzisk Wielkopolski
15:00 CEST (UTC+02:00)	Kopczyński 10' (pen.)	Ekstraklasa; 90minut	Amaral 22'; Ishak 45+4'	Stadium: Stadion Miejski; Attendance: 4,820; Referee: Tomasz Kwiatkowski (Warsaw)

21 May 2022 Match 34	Lech Poznań	2–1	Zagłębie Lubin	Poznań
17:30 CEST (UTC+02:00)	Kędziora 10'; Czerwiński 38'	Ekstraklasa; 90minut	Chodyna 64' (pen.)	Stadium: Stadion Miejski; Attendance: 41,008; Referee: Szymon Marciniak (Płock)

=== Polish Cup ===
28 September 2021 Round of 64	Skra Częstochowa	0–3	Lech Poznań	Poznań
16:00 CEST (UTC+02:00)		Łączy nas piłka 90minut	Sobiech 17'; Douglas 57'; Kozubal 84'	Stadium: Stadion Miejski; Attendance: 3,622; Referee: Zbigniew Dobrynin (Łódź)

26 October 2021 Round of 32	Unia Skierniewice	0–2	Lech Poznań	Skierniewice
13:30 CEST (UTC+02:00)		Łączy nas piłka 90minut	Ramírez 9'; Broniarek 21' (pen.)	Stadium: Stadion Miejski; Attendance: 966; Referee: Patryk Gryckiewicz (Toruń)

1 December 2021 Round of 16	Garbarnia Kraków	0–4	Lech Poznań	Kraków
11:45 CET (UTC+01:00)		Łączy nas piłka 90minut	Marchwiński 16'; Banach 23' (o.g.); Czerwiński 32'; Murawski 64'	Stadium: Stadion RKS Garbarnia; Attendance: 820; Referee: Dominik Sulikowski (Gdańsk)

2 March 2022 Quarter-finals	Górnik Zabrze	0–2	Lech Poznań	Zabrze
18:00 CET (UTC+01:00)		Łączy nas piłka 90minut	Amaral 31', 58'	Stadium: Arena Zabrze; Attendance: 12,087; Referee: Bartosz Frankowski (Toruń)

5 April 2022 Semi-finals	Olimpia Grudziądz	0–3	Lech Poznań	Grudziądz
18:00 CEST (UTC+02:00)		Łączy nas piłka 90minut	Kownacki 26'; Douglas 49', 58'	Stadium: Bronisław Malinowski Stadium; Attendance: 3,300; Referee: Piotr Lasyk (Bytom)

2 May 2022 Final	Lech Poznań	1–3	Raków Częstochowa	Warsaw
16:00 CEST (UTC+02:00)	Amaral 52'	Łączy nas piłka 90minut	Gutkovskis 6'; Wdowiak 36'; Ivi 77'	Stadium: PGE Narodowy; Attendance: 35,694; Referee: Szymon Marciniak (Płock)

== Statistics ==
=== Appearances and goals ===
As of 22 May 2022.

No.	Pos	Player	Ekstraklasa		Polish Cup		Total	
No.	Pos	Player	Apps	Goals	Apps	Goals	Apps	Goals
Goalkeepers
1	GK	(Netherlands) Mickey van der Hart	16	0	3	0	19	0
35	GK	(Poland) Filip Bednarek	18+2	0	1	0	21	0
99	GK	(Poland) Miłosz Mleczko	0	0	0	0	0	0
Defenders
2	DF	(Portugal) Joel Pereira	20+8	0	4	0	32	0
3	DF	(Scotland) Barry Douglas	13+2	1	3+1	3	19	4
4	DF	(Poland) Tomasz Kędziora	3+3	1	1	0	7	1
5	DF	(Portugal) Pedro Rebocho	21	1	2	0	23	1
16	DF	(Croatia) Antonio Milić	25+1	4	2	0	28	4
18	DF	(Poland) Bartosz Salamon	25	3	1	0	26	3
20	DF	(Poland) Maksymilian Pingot	0	0	0	0	0	0
37	DF	(Slovakia) Ľubomír Šatka	22+3	1	3	0	28	1
44	DF	(Poland) Alan Czerwiński	6+5	1	3	1	14	2
Midfielders
6	MF	(Sweden) Jesper Karlström	30+2	1	3+1	0	36	1
7	MF	(Poland) Jakub Kamiński	33	9	3	0	36	9
10	MF	(Spain) Dani Ramírez	7+19	1	4+1	1	31	2
11	MF	(Poland) Filip Marchwiński	0+18	0	3+2	1	23	1
21	MF	(Poland) Michał Skóraś	11+18	2	5+1	0	35	2
22	MF	(Poland) Radosław Murawski	16+5	1	5	1	26	2
23	MF	(Norway) Kristoffer Velde	5+3	0	1+1	0	10	0
24	MF	(Portugal) João Amaral	28+4	14	1+3	3	36	17
25	MF	(Portugal) Pedro Tiba	12+13	2	1+1	0	27	2
27	MF	(Poland) Mateusz Skrzypczak	0+2	0	4+1	0	7	0
30	MF	(Georgia (country)) Nika Kvekveskiri	11+18	2	3+3	0	35	2
34	MF	(Poland) Tymoteusz Klupś	0	0	0	0	0	0
50	MF	(Ivory Coast) Adriel Ba Loua	14+11	1	0+4	0	29	1
74	MF	(Poland) Jakub Antczak	0+1	0	0	0	1	0
Forwards
9	FW	(Sweden) Mikael Ishak	31	18	1+1	0	33	18
17	FW	(Poland) Filip Wilak	0	0	0	0	0	0
19	FW	(Poland) Norbert Pacławski	0	0	0+2	0	2	0
90	FW	(Poland) Artur Sobiech	0+12	0	3	1	15	1
97	FW	(Poland) Dawid Kownacki	7+7	4	3	1	17	5
Players who appeared for Lech and left the club during the season:
4	DF	(Norway) Thomas Rogne	1	0	1+1	0	3	0
8	MF	(Czech Republic) Jan Sýkora	0+4	0	0	0	4	0
28	DF	(Poland) Filip Borowski	0	0	0+1	0	1	0
33	GK	(Poland) Bartosz Mrozek	0	0	2	0	2	0
38	MF	(Poland) Jakub Karbownik	0	0	0	0	0	0
43	MF	(Poland) Antoni Kozubal	0+1	0	0+3	1	4	1
74	DF	(Poland) Krystian Palacz	0	0	0	0	0	0
88	FW	(Croatia) Roko Baturina	0	0	1+2	0	3	0

=== Goalscorers ===
As of 22 May 2022.

Place	Number	Position	Nation	Name	Ekstraklasa	Polish Cup	Total
1	9	FW	(Sweden)	Mikael Ishak	18	0	18
2	24	MF	(Portugal)	João Amaral	14	3	17
3	7	MF	(Poland)	Jakub Kamiński	9	0	9
4	97	FW	(Poland)	Dawid Kownacki	4	1	5
5	3	DF	(Scotland)	Barry Douglas	1	3	4
5	16	DF	(Croatia)	Antonio Milić	3	0	4
7	18	DF	(Poland)	Bartosz Salamon	3	0	3
7	Own goal				1	2	3
9	10	MF	(Spain)	Dani Ramírez	1	1	2
9	21	MF	(Poland)	Michał Skóraś	2	0	2
9	22	MF	(Poland)	Radosław Murawski	1	1	2
9	25	MF	(Portugal)	Pedro Tiba	2	0	2
9	30	MF	(Georgia (country))	Nika Kvekveskiri	2	0	2
9	44	DF	(Poland)	Alan Czerwiński	1	1	2
15	4	DF	(Poland)	Tomasz Kędziora	1	0	1
15	5	DF	(Portugal)	Pedro Rebocho	1	0	1
15	6	MF	(Sweden)	Jesper Karlström	1	0	1
15	11	MF	(Poland)	Filip Marchwiński	0	1	1
15	37	DF	(Slovenia)	Ľubomír Šatka	1	0	1
15	43	MF	(Poland)	Antoni Kozubal	0	1	1
15	50	MF	(Ivory Coast)	Adriel Ba Loua	1	0	1
15	90	FW	(Poland)	Artur Sobiech	0	1	1
TOTALS					67	15	82

=== Assists ===
As of 22 May 2022.

Place	Number	Position	Nation	Name	Ekstraklasa	Polish Cup	Total
1	2	DF	(Portugal)	Joel Pereira	7	2	9
2	10	MF	(Spain)	Dani Ramírez	4	4	8
2	24	MF	(Portugal)	João Amaral	8	0	8
4	7	MF	(Poland)	Jakub Kamiński	6	0	6
5	5	DF	(Portugal)	Pedro Rebocho	4	1	5
5	9	FW	(Sweden)	Mikael Ishak	5	0	5
7	3	DF	(Scotland)	Barry Douglas	2	1	3
8	16	DF	(Croatia)	Antonio Milić	2	0	2
8	21	MF	(Poland)	Michał Skóraś	1	1	2
8	37	DF	(Slovakia)	Ľubomír Šatka	2	0	2
8	50	MF	(Ivory Coast)	Adriel Ba Loua	2	0	2
8	99	FW	(Poland)	Dawid Kownacki	1	1	2
13	1	GK	(Netherlands)	Mickey van der Hart	1	0	1
13	6	MF	(Sweden)	Jesper Karlström	1	0	1
13	23	MF	(Norway)	Kristoffer Velde	1	0	1
13	30	MF	(Georgia (country))	Nika Kvekveskiri	1	0	1
13	43	MF	(Poland)	Antoni Kozubal	0	1	1
TOTALS					48	11	59

=== Clean sheets ===
As of 22 May 2022.

Place	Number	Nation	Name	Ekstraklasa	Polish Cup	Total
1	35	(Poland)	Filip Bednarek	9	1	10
2	1	(Netherlands)	Mickey van der Hart	7	2	9
3	33	(Poland)	Bartosz Mrozek	0	2	2
TOTALS				16	5	21

=== Disciplinary record ===
As of 22 May 2022.

Number	Position	Nation	Name	Ekstraklasa			Polish Cup			Total		
Number	Position	Nation	Name	Booked	(yellow card) (yellow-red card)	Sent off (straight red)	Booked	(yellow card) (yellow-red card)	Sent off (straight red)	Booked	(yellow card) (yellow-red card)	Sent off (straight red)
1	GK	(Netherlands)	Mickey van der Hart	0	0	0	0	0	0	0	0	0
2	DF	(Portugal)	Joel Pereira	1	0	1	0	0	0	1	0	1
3	DF	(Scotland)	Barry Douglas	5	0	0	0	0	0	5	0	0
4	DF	(Poland)	Tomasz Kędziora	0	0	0	0	0	0	0	0	0
5	DF	(Portugal)	Pedro Rebocho	1	0	0	1	0	0	2	0	0
6	MF	(Sweden)	Jesper Karlström	5	0	0	1	0	0	6	0	0
7	MF	(Poland)	Jakub Kamiński	2	0	0	0	0	0	2	0	0
9	FW	(Sweden)	Mikael Ishak	5	0	0	0	0	0	5	0	0
10	MF	(Spain)	Dani Ramírez	2	0	0	0	0	0	2	0	0
11	MF	(Poland)	Filip Marchwiński	1	0	0	1	0	0	2	0	0
16	DF	(Croatia)	Antonio Milić	3	0	0	1	0	0	4	0	0
17	FW	(Poland)	Filip Wilak	–						0	0	0
18	DF	(Poland)	Bartosz Salamon	3	0	0	0	0	0	3	0	0
19	FW	(Poland)	Norbert Pacławski	–			0	0	0	0	0	0
20	DF	(Poland)	Maksymilian Pingot	–						0	0	0
21	MF	(Poland)	Michał Skóraś	4	0	0	2	0	0	6	0	0
22	MF	(Poland)	Radosław Murawski	0	0	0	1	0	0	1	0	0
23	MF	(Norway)	Kristoffer Velde	0	0	0	0	0	0	0	0	0
24	MF	(Portugal)	João Amaral	2	0	0	1	0	0	3	0	0
25	MF	(Portugal)	Pedro Tiba	4	0	0	0	0	0	4	0	0
27	MF	(Poland)	Mateusz Skrzypczak	0	0	0	0	0	0	0	0	0
30	MF	(Georgia (country))	Nika Kvekveskiri	4	1	0	0	0	0	4	1	0
34	MF	(Poland)	Tymoteusz Klupś	–						0	0	0
35	GK	(Poland)	Filip Bednarek	0	0	0	0	0	0	0	0	0
37	DF	(Slovakia)	Ľubomír Šatka	2	0	0	0	0	0	2	0	0
44	DF	(Poland)	Alan Czerwiński	0	0	0	0	0	0	0	0	0
50	MF	(Ivory Coast)	Adriel Ba Loua	3	0	0	0	0	0	3	0	0
74	MF	(Poland)	Jakub Antczak	0	0	0	–			0	0	0
90	FW	(Poland)	Artur Sobiech	0	0	0	1	0	0	1	0	0
97	FW	(Poland)	Dawid Kownacki	5	0	0	0	0	0	5	0	0
99	GK	(Poland)	Miłosz Mleczko	–						0	0	0
Players who appeared for Lech and left the club during the season:
4	DF	(Norway)	Thomas Rogne	0	0	0	0	0	0	0	0	0
8	MF	(Czech Republic)	Jan Sýkora	0	0	0	–			0	0	0
28	DF	(Poland)	Filip Borowski	–			0	0	0	0	0	0
33	GK	(Poland)	Bartosz Mrozek	–			0	0	0	0	0	0
38	MF	(Poland)	Jakub Karbownik	–						0	0	0
43	MF	(Poland)	Antoni Kozubal	0	0	0	0	0	0	0	0	0
74	DF	(Poland)	Krystian Palacz	–						0	0	0
88	FW	(Croatia)	Roko Baturina	–			0	0	0	0	0	0
TOTALS				52	1	1	9	0	0	61	1	1

=== Home attendances ===
As of 24 April 2022.

	Matches	Total attendances	Average attendance	Highest attendance	Lowest attendance
Ekstraklasa	17	383,514	22,559	41,008	9,111
Polish Cup	1	3,622	3,622	3,622	3,622
Total	18	387,136	21,507	41,008	3,622
