= 2012–13 FC St. Gallen season =

St. Gallen
2012–13 season
- Chairman: Dölf Früh
- Manager: Jeff Saibene
- Stadium: AFG Arena, St. Gallen (19'694)
- Swiss Super League: 3rd
- Swiss Cup: Round 3
- Top goalscorer: Oscar Scarione (21)
Home colours	Away colours

The 2012–13 FC St. Gallen season in the Swiss Super League.

== Players ==
=== Current squad ===
As of 2 February 2013. Note: Flags indicate national team as defined under FIFA eligibility rules; some limited exceptions apply. Players may hold more than one non-FIFA nationality.

No.	Pos.	Nation	Player
1	GK	SUI	Daniel Lopar
4	MF	CRO	Ilija Ivić
5	DF	LIE	Martin Stocklasa
6	DF	SUI	Philippe Montandon
7	MF	ALB	Kristian Nushi
8	MF	SUI	Stéphane Nater
9	MF	GAM	Pa Modou Jagne
10	MF	ARG	Oscar Scarione
11	FW	CMR	Franck Etoundi
13	MF	AUT	Manuel Sutter
14	MF	SUI	Mario Schönenberger
15	DF	FRA	Stéphane Besle
16	FW	SWE	Mikael Ishak

No.	Pos.	Nation	Player
18	GK	SUI	Germano Vailati
19	DF	LUX	Mario Mutsch
20	FW	SVN	Džengis Čavušević
21	DF	CRO	Ivan Martić
23	FW	SUI	Sven Lehmann
24	DF	SUI	Marco Hämmerli
26	FW	SUI	Nico Abegglen
27	MF	SUI	Marco Mathys
28	MF	ALB	Ermir Lenjani
30	GK	CRO	Ilija Kovacic
31	MF	GER	Dejan Janjatović
33	FW	SUI	Igor Tadić
—	FW	SRB	Savo Kovačević
