= Antczak =

Antczak is a Polish surname. Notable people with the surname include:

- Jakub Antczak (born 2004), Polish footballer
- Jerzy Antczak (born 1929), Polish film director
- Zdzisław Antczak (1947–2019), Polish handball player
