= 2016–17 Randers FC season =

Randers FC is a Danish professional football team based in Randers, which plays in the top-flight Danish Superliga championship. During the 2016–17 campaign they will be competing in the following competitions: Superliga, DBU Pokalen.

== Superliga ==
18 July 2016 1	Midtjylland	2 – 2	Randers	Herning
19:00 CET	Kadlec 41'; Olsson (yellow card) 56'; Onuachu 65'; Duelund (yellow card) 69'; Nissen (yellow card) 82'	Summary	Fisker 27'; Agesen (yellow card) 73'; Marxen (yellow card) 76'; Masango 77'	Stadium: MCH Arena; Attendance: 5,725; Referee: (Denmark) Jens Maae

24 July 2016 2	Randers	0 – 1	AaB	Randers
20:00 CET		Summary	Meilinger 29'; Würtz (yellow card) 84'; Grønning (yellow card) 90+1'	Stadium: BioNutria Park Randers; Attendance: 4,443; Referee: (Denmark) Michael Tykgaard

31 July 2016 3	AGF	1 – 2	Randers	Aarhus
18:00 CET	Khodzhaniyazov 45'; Petersen (yellow card) 56'; Backman (yellow card) 67'; Pedersen (yellow card) 84'; Mikanović (yellow card) 86'	Summary	Fenger (yellow card) 11'; Ishak (yellow card) 21' (goal) 37'; Kauko 26' (yellow card) 42'; Agesen (yellow card) 54'	Stadium: Ceres Park; Attendance: 13,047; Referee: (Denmark) Michael Johansen

5 August 2016 4	Randers	1 – 0	Horsens	Randers
18:00 CET	Mitrović (yellow card) 19'; Lundberg 23'; Marxen (yellow card) 30' (yellow-red card); Allansson (yellow card) 46'; Halldórsson (yellow card) 90'	Summary	Hansson (yellow card) 26'; Nielsen (yellow card) 45' (yellow-red card)	Stadium: BioNutria Park Randers; Attendance: 4,326; Referee: (Denmark) Jørgen Daugbjerg Burchardt

12 August 2016 5	Viborg	0 – 1	Randers	Viborg
18:00 CET	Keller (yellow card) 36'; Bruhn (yellow card) 51'	Summary	Lundberg 67'; Babayan (yellow card) 86'	Stadium: Energi Viborg Arena; Attendance: 4,065; Referee: (Denmark) Lars Christoffersen

19 August 2016 6	Nordsjælland	1 – 1	Randers	Farum
18:00 CET	Donyoh 64'; Ramón (yellow card) 67'	Summary	Kallesøe 18'; Bager (yellow card) 45+1'	Stadium: Farum Park; Attendance: 1,903; Referee: (Denmark) Sandi Putros

26 August 2016 7	Randers	1 – 0	Silkeborg	Randers
18:00 CET	Kallesøe 36'	Summary	Jakobsen (yellow card) 16'	Stadium: BioNutria Park Randers; Attendance: 4,146; Referee: (Denmark) Anders Poulsen (referee)

9 September 2016 8	Randers	2 – 0	Lyngby	Randers
18:00 CET	Marxen 27'; Ishak 43' (yellow card) 52'; Kauko (yellow card) 44'; Fenger (red card) 70'	Summary	Kjær (yellow card) 44'; Rasmussen (yellow card) 63'; Rygaard Jensen (yellow card) 72'	Stadium: BioNutria Park Randers; Attendance: 4,128; Referee: (Denmark) Jens Maae

16 September 2016 9	Esbjerg fB	1 – 1	Randers	Esbjerg
18:00 CET	Nordvik 32'	Summary	Bager (yellow card) 45'; Lundberg 78'	Stadium: Blue Water Arena; Attendance: 4,450; Referee: (Denmark) Jørgen Daugbjerg Burchardt

21 September 2016 10	Randers	2 – 2	Copenhagen	Randers
18:00 CET	Pourié (yellow card) 37' (goal) 41'; Marxen 57'	Summary	Santander 19' 79' (yellow card) 21'; Kvist (yellow card) 44'	Stadium: BioNutria Park Randers; Attendance: 5,729; Referee: (Denmark) Jakob Kehlet

25 September 2016 11	Randers	0 – 4	SønderjyskE	Randers
14:00 CET	Poulsen (yellow card) 23' (yellow-red card)	Summary	Luyckx (yellow card) 18' (goal) 84'; Hende 22'; Madsen 43'; Drachmann (yellow card) 57'; Pedersen 66'	Stadium: BioNutria Park Randers; Attendance: 5,034; Referee: (Denmark) Morten Krogh
