= Volkan Dikmen =

Turkish footballer (born 1991)

Personal information
- Full name: Volkan Dikmen
- Date of birth: 14 October 1991 (age 35)
- Place of birth: Berlin, Germany
- Height: 1.93 m (6 ft 4 in)
- Positions: Defender; center back

Team information
- Current team: CFC Hertha 06

Youth career
- –2005: SV Nord Wedding
- 2005–2009: Hertha BSC

Senior career*
Years	Team	Apps	(Gls)
2009–2010	Hertha BSC II	0	(0)
2010	Kayserispor	2	(0)
2011–2012	Türkiyemspor Berlin	6	(0)
2012	Sancaktepe	4	(0)
2013	Tavşanlı Linyitspor	0	(0)
2013–2015	Trabzon Akçaabat	38	(3)
2015	Kahramanmaraş BB	13	(1)
2015–2016	Diyarbakır BB	10	(0)
2016–2017	Dersimspor	16	(0)
2017–	CFC Hertha 06	33	(0)

International career
- Turkey U17
- Turkey U18
- Turkey U19
- * Club domestic league appearances and goals as of 3 May 2018

Volkan Dikmen (born 14 October 1991, in Berlin) is a Turkish footballer who plays for CFC Hertha 06.

He started his playing career in Hertha BSC's youth team and joined the second team during 2009. Dikmen was linked with moves to Istanbul sides Galatasaray and Fenerbahçe, but signed a 1.5 year contract with Kayserispor in January 2010. Dikmen made his professional debut as a second-half substitute in a league match against Eskişehirspor on 14 March 2010.
