= Mikael Ishak =

Swedish footballer (born 1993)

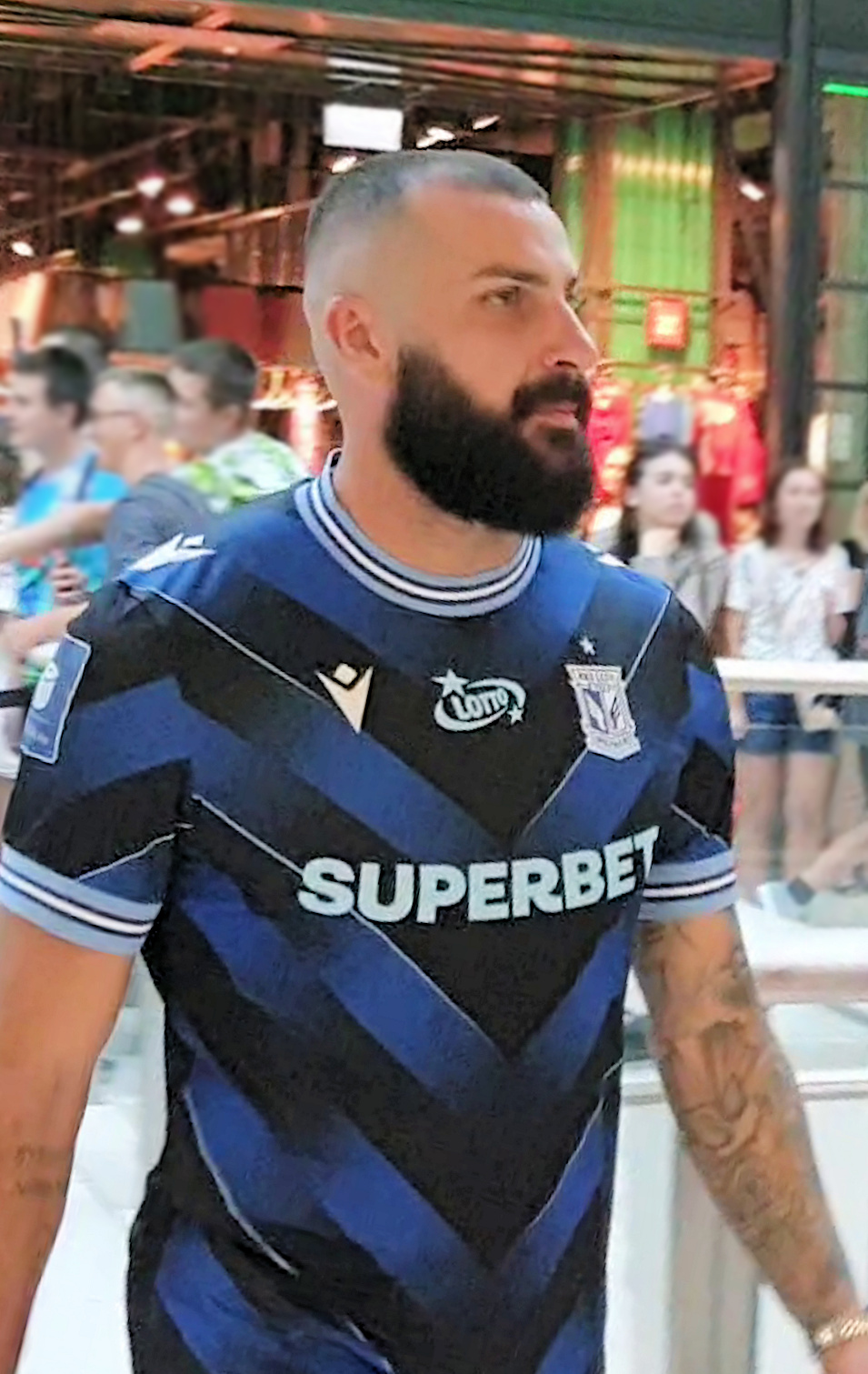
- Ishak in 2023 with Lech Poznań

Personal information
- Date of birth: 31 March 1993 (age 33)
- Place of birth: Södertälje, Sweden
- Height: 1.84 m (6 ft 0 in)
- Position: Forward

Team information
- Current team: Lech Poznań
- Number: 9

Youth career
- –2010: Assyriska FF

Senior career*
Years	Team	Apps	(Gls)
2010–2011	Assyriska FF	47	(13)
2012–2013	1. FC Köln	18	(0)
2013	→ St. Gallen (loan)	13	(3)
2013–2014	Parma	0	(0)
2013–2014	→ Crotone (loan)	24	(4)
2014–2017	Randers	71	(31)
2017–2020	1. FC Nürnberg	77	(17)
2020–	Lech Poznań	172	(92)

International career
2011	Sweden U19	8	(3)
2012–2016	Sweden U21/O	27	(11)
2015–2022	Sweden	7	(1)
Medal record
Men's football
Representing Sweden
UEFA European Under-21 Championship
Winner	2015 Czech Republic
- * Club domestic league appearances and goals as of 10:56, 16 November 2026 (UTC)

Mikael Ishak (Arabic: ميكائيل إسحاق; born 31 March 1993) is a Swedish professional footballer who plays as a forward for and captains Ekstraklasa club Lech Poznań.

Beginning his career with Assyriska FF in 2010, he has gone on to play professionally in Germany, Switzerland, Italy, Denmark, and Poland. In 2020, he signed for Lech Poznań and has since won three league titles and reached the 2022–23 UEFA Europa Conference League quarter-finals as club captain. He is the third-best foreign goalscorer in Ekstraklasa history (with 92 goals), all-time best foreign scorer for Lech (126) and all-time best scorer for any Polish club in European competitions (32).

A full international since 2015, he has won seven caps and scored one goal for the Sweden national team. He represented the Sweden Olympic team at the 2016 Summer Olympics.

== Club career ==
=== Early life and career ===
Ishak's parents were Assyrian migrants from Syria. He was born in Södertälje, Sweden and started his professional career at Assyriska FF, where he was included in the first team in 2010.

=== 1. FC Köln ===
In December 2011, Ishak was signed by German Bundesliga club 1. FC Köln after a successful trial. He made his debut for the side on 21 January 2012 in a 1–0 away defeat at VfL Wolfsburg, where he came on as a substitute in the 85th minute for Martin Lanig. After being used mostly as a substitute during his first month in Köln, Ishak made his first start for the club on 18 March following a suspension for regular striker Lukas Podolski, playing the entire match in a 4–1 away loss at Hannover 96. Ishak would make 11 appearances for 1. FC Köln during his first season.

==== Loan to FC St. Gallen ====
In February 2013, Ishak signed a six-month loan deal with Swiss club FC St. Gallen, who had recently been promoted to the Swiss Super League, in order to play more. He became a regular starter for the club, before suffering a mandibular fracture in a match for the Sweden under-21 team. Ishak made his return in late-April as a substitute in a match against FC Zürich, before becoming a full-time starter again the following week. He made a total of 13 league appearances for St. Gallen, in which he scored three goals.

=== Parma ===
Ishak joined Italian Serie A club Parma on a four-year contract on 5 August 2013.

==== Loan to Crotone ====
He was loaned out to Crotone, competing in the Serie B, following his arrival. He made his debut for Crotone on 24 August 2013 in a match against Siena. On 24 September, he scored his first goal for the side in a 3–1 home win over Modena.

=== Randers ===
In August 2014, a year after joining Parma, Ishak moved to Danish Superliga club Randers FC, signing a three-year contract. He played for the club for two-and-a-half years, scoring 31 goals in 71 league appearances.

=== 1. FC Nürnberg ===
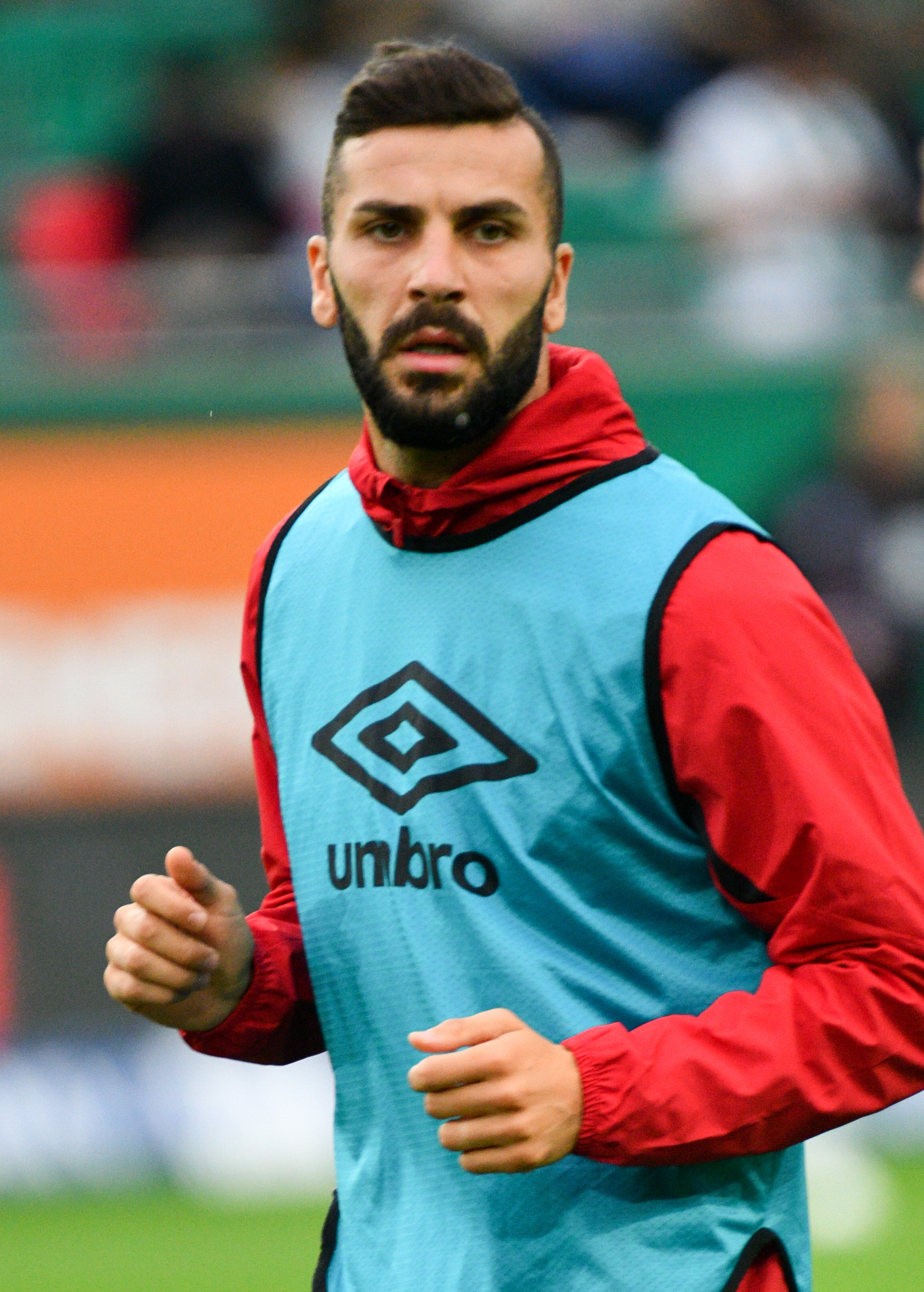
Ishak with 1. FC Nürnberg in 2019

After a highly successful stay at Randers, Ishak joined German 2. Bundesliga club 1. FC Nürnberg in January 2017, six months before his contract expired. He scored Nürnberg's 1000th goal in the 2. Bundesliga on 25 November 2017, in a match against Eintracht Braunschweig. At the end of the 2017–18 season, he reached promotion to the Bundesliga with the club. Ishak scored his first goal in the Bundesliga on 1 September 2018, an important equalizer in the away game against Mainz 05, which ended 1–1.

=== Lech Poznań ===
On 14 July 2020, Ishak joined Polish club Lech Poznań on a free transfer, signing a three-year contract. He was given the shirt number 9, previously worn by the outgoing Danish striker Christian Gytkjær. In his first season in Poland, despite missing over a dozen games due to health issues, he was Lech's top scorer with 20 goals, including two strikes against Benfica and three goals against Standard Liège in the 2020–21 UEFA Europa League group stage.

Despite missing out on European competitions, the 2021–22 campaign was successful for both Lech and Ishak, who improved both health-wise and stats-wise. Named captain before the start of the season, the Swedish striker led Lech to their eighth Ekstraklasa title, including a 88th-minute winner against Piast Gliwice on 8 May 2022, which put Lech on top of the league table with two games to go. He finished the season with 18 league goals and was named the Ekstraklasa Forward of the Season.

Ishak opened the 2022–23 campaign season by scoring the only goal in a UEFA Champions League first qualifying round match against Azerbaijani side Qarabağ on 5 July 2022. Although marred by health concerns throughout the season, he appeared in all but one of Lech's twenty games across their European campaign, scoring nine goals as the Poznań outfit reached the UEFA Europa Conference League quarter-finals. In November 2022, he extended his deal until the end of June 2025, reportedly becoming the highest-earning player in Ekstraklasa at the time. With 20 goals to his name across all competitions, he was the club's best scorer for the third season in a row.

On 13 April 2024, Ishak became Lech's top foreign scorer of all time, taking the title away from Gytkjær, after scoring his 66th goal in a 2–1 away loss against Puszcza Niepołomice. Later that year, on 5 November, he signed a new contract, keeping him at the club until mid-2027.

Throughout the 2024–25 season, Ishak scored 21 goals and provided five assists in 32 league appearances, as Lech took their ninth league title, Ishak's second as the club's captain.

On 22 July 2025, Ishak scored his first hat-trick for Lech, converting three penalty kicks in a 7–1 win over Icelandic side Breiðablik in the UEFA Champions League second qualifying round. With 20 goals for Lech in Europe, he surpassed Miroslav Radović as the best foreign scorer for Polish clubs in European competitions. On 20 September, he scored his 100th and 101st goals for Lech in a 2–0 league win against Bruk-Bet Termalica Nieciecza. He ended the season with 31 goals across all competitions, his career best goal tally across a single season. 16 of those 31 goals were scored in the Ekstraklasa, as Lech won their second consecutive league title, tenth overall and Ishak's third.

== International career ==
=== Youth ===
Ishak represented the Sweden U21 team at the 2015 UEFA European Under-21 Championship, and played in four games as Sweden won the entire tournament. He was also a part of the Sweden Olympic team that competed at the 2016 Summer Olympics in Rio, and scored in a group stage game against Colombia before Sweden was knocked after only three games.

=== Senior ===
Ishak made his full international debut for the Sweden national team on 15 January 2015 in a friendly 2–0 win against the Ivory Coast, coming on as a substitute for Isaac Kiese Thelin in the 82nd minute. He scored his first international goal for Sweden on 6 January 2016, in a 1–1 tie with Estonia. Ishak made his competitive international debut for Sweden on 24 September 2022, in a 2022–23 UEFA Nations League B game against Serbia, coming on as a substitute for Dejan Kulusevski in the 85th minute of a 1–4 loss.

== Career statistics ==
=== Club ===
As of match played 25 October 2026

Appearances and goals by club, season and competition
Club	Season	League			National cup (Note: Includes Svenska Cupen, DFB-Pokal, Danish Cup, Polish Cup)		Continental		Other		Total	
Club	Season	Division	Apps	Goals	Apps	Goals	Apps	Goals	Apps	Goals	Apps	Goals
Assyriska	2010	Superettan	19	4	1	0	—		—		20	4
Assyriska	2011	Superettan	28	9	1	0	—		—		29	9
Assyriska	Total		47	13	2	0	—		—		49	13
Köln	2011–12	Bundesliga	11	0	0	0	—		—		11	0
Köln	2012–13	2. Bundesliga	7	0	1	0	—		—		8	0
Köln	Total		18	0	1	0	—		—		19	0
Köln II	2011–12	Regionalliga	1	0	—		—		—		1	0
Köln II	2012–13	Regionalliga	4	2	—		—		—		4	2
Köln II	Total		5	2	0	0	—		—		5	2
St. Gallen (loan)	2012–13	Swiss Super League	13	3	0	0	—		—		13	3
Crotone (loan)	2013–14	Serie B	24	4	0	0	—		—		24	4
Randers	2014–15	Danish Superliga	26	11	3	1	—		—		29	12
Randers	2015–16	Danish Superliga	28	12	1	0	2 (Note: Appearances in UEFA Europa League)	1	—		31	13
Randers	2016–17	Danish Superliga	17	8	1	1	—		—		18	9
Randers	Total		71	31	5	2	2	1	—		78	34
Nürnberg	2016–17	2. Bundesliga	7	0	0	0	—		—		7	0
Nürnberg	2017–18	2. Bundesliga	28	12	3	1	—		—		31	13
Nürnberg	2018–19	Bundesliga	29	4	2	2	—		—		31	6
Nürnberg	2019–20	2. Bundesliga	13	1	2	0	—		—		15	1
Nürnberg	Total		77	17	7	3	—		—		84	20
Lech Poznań	2020–21	Ekstraklasa	22	12	1	0	10	8	—		33	20
Lech Poznań	2021–22	Ekstraklasa	31	18	2	0	—		—		33	18
Lech Poznań	2022–23	Ekstraklasa	23	11	1	0	19 (Note: Two appearances and one goal in UEFA Champions League, seventeen appearances and eight goals in UEFA Europa Conference League)	9	0	0	43	20
Lech Poznań	2023–24	Ekstraklasa	24	11	1	0	3 (Note: Appearances in UEFA Europa Conference League)	0	—		28	11
Lech Poznań	2024–25	Ekstraklasa	32	21	0	0	—		—		32	21
Lech Poznań	2025–26	Ekstraklasa	31	16	3	1	15 (Note: Four appearances and six goals in UEFA Champions League, one appearance in UEFA Europa League, ten appearances and eight goals in UEFA Conference League)	14	1 (Note: Appearance in Polish Super Cup)	0	50	31
Lech Poznań	2026–27	Ekstraklasa	9	3	0	0	7 (Note: Two appearances and one goal in UEFA Champions League, five appearances in UEFA Europa League)	1	1	1	17	5
Lech Poznań	Total		172	92	8	1	54	32	2	1	236	126
Career total			427	163	23	6	56	33	2	1	508	203

=== International ===
As of match played 16 November 2022

Appearances and goals by national team and year
National team	Year	Apps	Goals
Sweden
Sweden	2015	2	0
Sweden	2016	2	1
Sweden	2022	3	0
Total		7	1

Scores and results list Sweden's goal tally first, score column indicates score after each Ishak goal.

List of international goals scored by Mikael ishak
No.	Date	Venue	Opponent	Score	Result	Competition	Ref.
1	6 January 2016	Armed Forces Stadium, Abu Dhabi, United Arab Emirates	Estonia	1–1	1–1	Friendly	

== Honours ==
Lech Poznań

- Ekstraklasa: 2021–22, 2024–25, 2025–26
- Polish Super Cup: 2026

Sweden U21

- UEFA European Under-21 Championship: 2015

Individual

- Ekstraklasa Player of the Month: May 2022, March 2026
- Ekstraklasa Forward of the Season: 2021–22
- Piłka Nożna Foreigner of the Year: 2022, 2025
