= Filip Borowski =

Polish footballer

Personal information
- Date of birth: 6 October 2003 (age 23)
- Place of birth: Bydgoszcz, Poland
- Height: 1.79 m (5 ft 10 in)
- Position: Right-back

Team information
- Current team: Piast Gliwice
- Number: 28

Youth career
- –2013: Chemik Bydgoszcz
- 2013–2014: Polonia Bydgoszcz
- 2014–2015: Chemik Bydgoszcz
- 2015–2016: Zawisza Bydgoszcz
- 2016–2020: Lech Poznań

Senior career*
Years	Team	Apps	(Gls)
2020–2024	Lech Poznań II	34	(1)
2020–2025	Lech Poznań	0	(0)
2022–2023	→ Zagłębie Sosnowiec (loan)	40	(0)
2023–2024	→ Warta Poznań (loan)	24	(0)
2024–2025	→ Ruch Chorzów (loan)	13	(0)
2025–	Piast Gliwice	14	(1)

International career
2019	Poland U16	4	(0)
2019	Poland U17	2	(0)
2021	Poland U19	1	(0)
2023	Poland U20	4	(0)
- * Club domestic league appearances and goals as of 21:57, 29 May 2026 (UTC)

Filip Borowski (born 6 October 2003) is a Polish professional footballer who plays as a right-back for Ekstraklasa club Piast Gliwice.

== Career statistics ==
As of match played 23 May 2026

Appearances and goals by club, season and competition
Club	Season	League			Polish Cup		Europe		Other		Total	
Club	Season	Division	Apps	Goals	Apps	Goals	Apps	Goals	Apps	Goals	Apps	Goals
Lech Poznań II	2020–21	II liga	13	0	2	0	—		—		15	0
Lech Poznań II	2021–22	II liga	17	1	0	0	—		—		17	1
Lech Poznań II	2024–25	III liga, gr. II	4	0	1	0	—		—		5	0
Lech Poznań II	Total		34	1	3	0	—		—		37	1
Lech Poznań	2020–21	Ekstraklasa	0	0	1	0	0	0	—		1	0
Lech Poznań	2021–22	Ekstraklasa	0	0	1	0	—		—		1	0
Lech Poznań	Total		0	0	2	0	0	0	—		2	0
Zagłębie Sosnowiec (loan)	2021–22	I liga	10	0	—		—		—		10	0
Zagłębie Sosnowiec (loan)	2022–23	I liga	30	0	2	0	—		—		32	0
Zagłębie Sosnowiec (loan)	Total		40	0	2	0	—		—		42	0
Warta Poznań (loan)	2023–24	Ekstraklasa	24	0	3	0	—		—		27	0
Ruch Chorzów (loan)	2024–25	I liga	13	0	5	0	—		—		18	0
Piast Gliwice	2025–26	Ekstraklasa	14	1	1	0	—		—		15	1
Career total			125	2	16	0	0	0	0	0	141	2
