= João Amaral (footballer, born 1991) =

Portuguese footballer

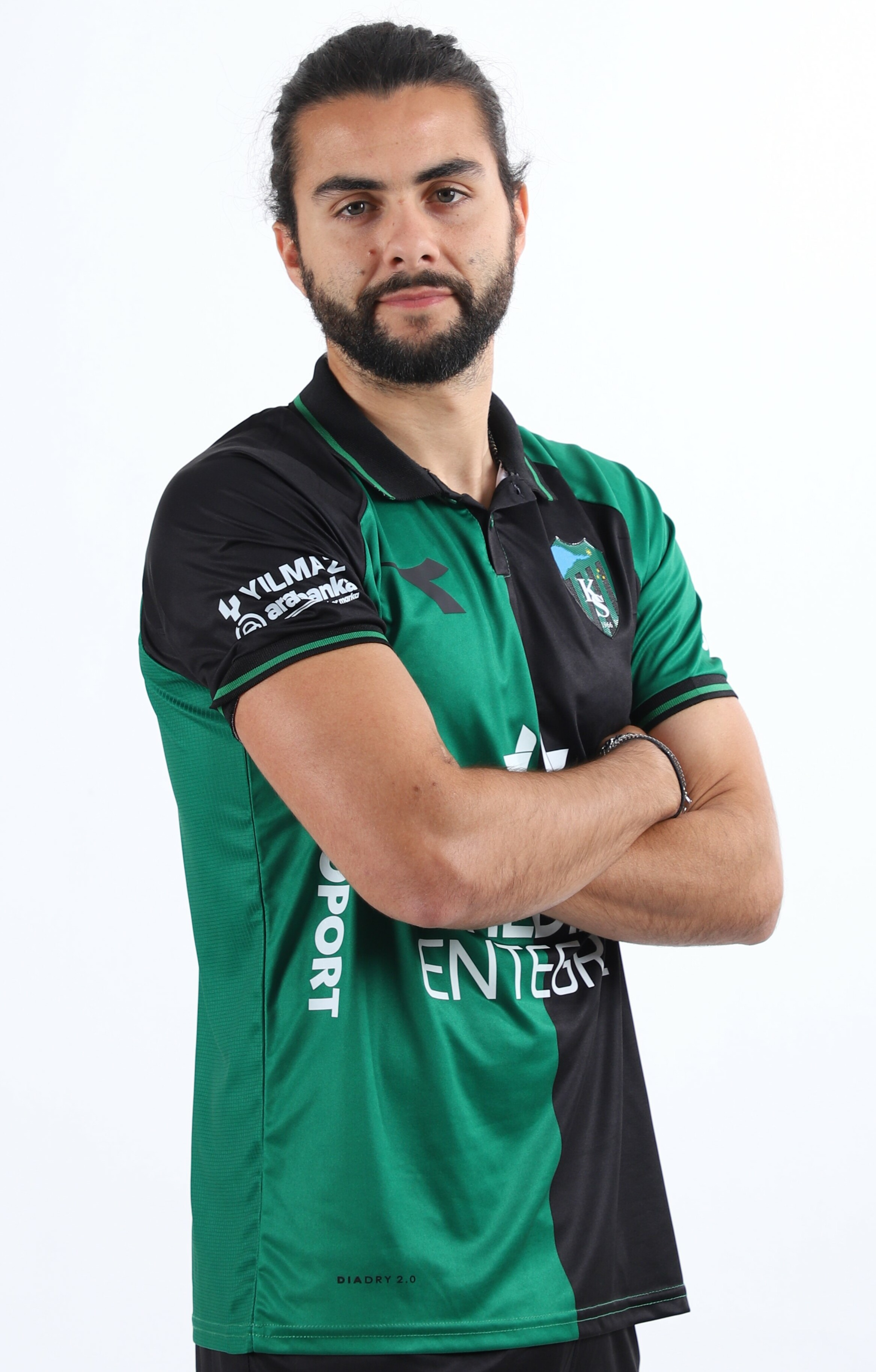
- Amaral in 2023

Personal information
- Full name: João Pedro Reis Amaral
- Date of birth: 7 September 1991 (age 35)
- Place of birth: Vila Nova de Gaia, Portugal
- Height: 1.72 m (5 ft 8 in)
- Positions: Attacking midfielder; winger

Team information
- Current team: Fafe
- Number: 24

Youth career
- 2003–2009: Vilanovense
- 2009: Vila
- 2009–2010: Candal

Senior career*
Years	Team	Apps	(Gls)
2010–2012	Candal	63	(14)
2012–2013	Padroense	30	(3)
2013–2014	Mirandela	32	(6)
2014–2016	Pedras Rubras	40	(7)
2015	→ Oliveirense (loan)	21	(6)
2016–2017	Vitória Setúbal	33	(5)
2017–2018	Benfica	0	(0)
2017–2018	→ Vitória Setúbal (loan)	33	(9)
2018–2023	Lech Poznań	93	(27)
2019–2023	Lech Poznań II	4	(2)
2020–2021	→ Paços Ferreira (loan)	48	(2)
2023–2024	Kocaelispor	33	(4)
2024–2025	Al Batin	12	(1)
2025	Politehnica Iași	6	(0)
2025	Serikspor	15	(4)
2026	Bandırmaspor	17	(5)
2026–	Fafe	1	(0)
- * Club domestic league appearances and goals as of 11 October 2026

João Pedro Reis Amaral (born 7 September 1991) is a Portuguese professional footballer who plays as an attacking midfielder or a winger for Liga 3 club Fafe.

== Club career ==
=== Vitória Setúbal ===
Born in Vila Nova de Gaia, Porto District, Amaral played lower league and amateur football until the age of 24, working in a wine bottle label factory during this timeframe. On 6 June 2016, he moved straight into the Primeira Liga after signing a three-year contract with Vitória de Setúbal from Pedras Rubras.

Amaral made his debut in the Portuguese top division on 21 August 2016, starting and featuring 64 minutes in a 1–1 away draw against Benfica. He scored his first goal in the competition the following weekend to help the hosts defeat Arouca 2–0, adding a further four until the end of the season – while providing two assists – to help his team finish 12th.

=== Benfica and Lech Poznań ===
On 29 May 2018, Amaral joined Benfica on a three-year contract. Shortly after, on 21 July, he signed a four-year deal with Polish club Lech Poznań. He made his debut for the latter five days later, netting in the last minute of the 1–1 away draw against Shakhtyor Soligorsk in the second qualifying round of the UEFA Europa League.

Amaral returned to his country and its top tier on 2 January 2020, being loaned to Paços de Ferreira until 30 June. On 26 August, he agreed to a similar move to the same team.

Back at Lech, Amaral scored a career-best 14 goals in the 2021–22 campaign (17 in all competitions, with eight assists), as they won the Ekstraklasa for the eighth time in history.

=== Later career ===
Amaral returned abroad subsequently, where he represented Kocaelispor, Serikspor and Bandırmaspor in the TFF 1. Lig, Al Batin of the Saudi First Division League and Politehnica Iași from the Romanian Liga I.

== Career statistics ==
As of match played 13 December 2025

Appearances and goals by club, season and competition
Club	Season	League			National cup (Note: Includes Taça da Liga, Polish Cup, Turkish Cup, King's Cup)		Continental		Other		Total	
Club	Season	Division	Apps	Goals	Apps	Goals	Apps	Goals	Apps	Goals	Apps	Goals
Mirandela	2013–14	Campeonato de Portugal	32	6	0	0	—		—		32	6
Pedras Rubras	2014–15	Campeonato de Portugal	8	1	0	0	—		—		8	1
Pedras Rubras	2015–16	Campeonato de Portugal	32	6	0	0	—		—		32	6
Pedras Rubras	Total		40	7	0	0	—		—		40	7
Oliveirense	2014–15	Campeonato de Portugal	21	6	0	0	—		—		21	6
Vitória Setúbal	2016–17	Primeira Liga	33	5	1	0	—		2 (Note: Appearances in Taça da Liga)	0	36	5
Vitória Setúbal (loan)	2017–18	Primeira Liga	33	9	1	0	—		6	0	40	9
Vitória Setúbal (loan)	Total		66	14	2	0	—		8	0	76	14
Lech Poznań	2018–19	Ekstraklasa	25	8	2	1	3 (Note: Appearances in UEFA Europa League)	1	—		30	10
Lech Poznań	2019–20	Ekstraklasa	15	3	2	0	—		—		17	3
Lech Poznań	2021–22	Ekstraklasa	32	14	4	3	—		—		36	17
Lech Poznań	2022–23	Ekstraklasa	21	2	0	0	13 (Note: Two appearances in UEFA Champions League, eleven appearances and two goals in UEFA Conference League)	2	0	0	34	4
Lech Poznań	Total		93	27	8	4	16	3	0	0	117	34
Lech Poznań II	2019–20	II liga	1	0	—		—		—		1	0
Lech Poznań II	2022–23	II liga	3	2	—		—		—		3	2
Lech Poznań II	Total		4	2	—		—		—		4	2
Paços Ferreira (loan)	2019–20	Primeira Liga	19	1	1	0	—		—		20	1
Paços Ferreira (loan)	2020–21	Primeira Liga	29	1	2	0	—		1	0	32	1
Paços Ferreira (loan)	Total		48	2	3	0	—		1	0	52	2
Kocaelispor	2023–24	TFF 1. Lig	33	4	1	0	—		—		34	4
Al Batin	2024–25	Saudi First Division League	12	1	1	0	—		—		13	1
Politehnica Iași	2024–25	Liga I	6	0	—		—		1 (Note: Appearance in Liga I promotion/relegation play-offs)	0	7	0
Serikspor	2025–26	TFF 1. Lig	15	4	0	0	—		—		15	4
Career total			370	73	15	4	16	3	10	0	411	80

== Honours ==
Vitória Setúbal

- Taça da Liga runner-up: 2017–18

Lech Poznań

- Ekstraklasa: 2021–22
- Polish Cup runner-up: 2021–22
