= 2024–25 Chrobry Głogów season =

Chrobry Głogów
2024–25 season
- Manager: Piotr Plewnia
- Stadium: Głogów Municipal Stadium
- I liga: 12th
- Polish Cup: Pre-season
Home colours	Away colours

The 2024–25 season is the 79th season in the history of Chrobry Głogów, and the club's 11th consecutive season in I liga. In addition to the domestic league, the team is scheduled to participate in the Polish Cup.

== Transfers ==
=== In ===
Pos.	Player	Transferred from	Fee	Date	Source
GK	(Poland) Krzysztof Wróblewski	(Poland) Puszcza Niepołomice		10 July 2024	

== Friendlies ==
=== Pre-season ===
29 June 2024 Friendly	Warta Poznań (Poland)	1–0	(Poland) Chrobry Głogów	Poznań
11:00		Report		Stadium: Warta Poznań Stadium; Attendance: 0

3 July 2024 Friendly	Chrobry Głogów (Poland)	1–1	(Poland) Kotwica Kołobrzeg	Bucz
11:00	Ozimek 90'		Ziętek 82'	Stadium: Helios Bucz Stadium

6 July 2024 Friendly	Chrobry Głogów (Poland)	0–1	(Poland) Miedź Legnica	Głogów
10:30			Podgórski 80'	Stadium: Stadion GOS
Note: 4 x 30 minutes

13 July 2024 Friendly	Chrobry Głogów (Poland)	1–0	(Poland) Ślęza Wrocław	Głogów
10:00	46'; (red card) 90'		(red card) 29'	Stadium: Stadion GOS

13 July 2024 Friendly	Chrobry Głogów (Poland)	2–0	(Poland) KKS Kalisz	Głogów
12:00	Bonecki 16'; Lebedyński 58'			Stadium: Stadion GOS

== Competitions ==
=== Overall record ===
Competition	First match	Last match	Starting round	Record							
Competition	First match	Last match	Starting round	Pld	W	D	L	GF	GA	GD	Win %
I liga	20 July 2024	25–26 May 2025	Matchday 1	6	1	2	3	5	11	−6	16.67
Polish Cup	24 September 2024		First round	0	0	0	0	0	0	+0	—
Total				6	1	2	3	5	11	−6	16.67

Last updated: 20 August 2024
Source: Soccerway

=== I liga ===
==== League table ====
Pos	Team	Pld	W	D	L	GF	GA	GD	Pts
11	ŁKS Łódź	34	13	8	13	50	41	+9	47
12	Stal Rzeszów	34	9	8	17	42	59	−17	35
13	Chrobry Głogów	34	8	9	17	37	59	−22	33
14	Odra Opole	34	7	9	18	31	61	−30	30 (Note: Ranked based on head-to-head points: Odra Opole 6 pts, Pogoń Siedlce 0 pts.)
15	Pogoń Siedlce	34	7	9	18	38	53	−15	30

Source: 1liga.org, 90minut.pl
Rules for classification: 1) Points; 2) Head-to-head points; 3) Head-to-head goal difference; 4) Goal difference; 6) Goals scored; 7) Number of wins; 8) Number of away wins.
(Note: Head-to-head record is used only after all the matches between the teams in question have been played)
Notes:

Semi-finals; 29 May 2025
3	Wisła Płock	2
6	Polonia Warsaw	1
4	Wisła Kraków	0
5	Miedź Legnica	1

Final; 1 June 2025
3	Wisła Płock	2
5	Miedź Legnica	0

==== Results summary ====
Overall								Home						Away					
Pld	W	D	L	GF	GA	GD	Pts	W	D	L	GF	GA	GD	W	D	L	GF	GA	GD
6	1	2	3	5	11	−6	5	0	1	2	1	7	−6	1	1	1	4	4	0

Last updated: 20 August 2024.

==== Results by round ====
Round	1	2	3
Ground	A	H	A
Result	W	L	L
Position	3		

Updated to match(es) played on 3 August 2024. Source:
A = Away; H = Home; W = Win; D = Draw; L = Loss

==== Matches ====
The match schedule was released on 12 June 2024.

20 July 2024 1	Pogoń Siedlce	1–2	Chrobry Głogów	Siedlce
17:00	Miś (yellow card) 68'; Hrnčiar 90+3'		Bonecki 15'; Bartlewicz 45'; Mandrysz (yellow card) 83'; Kuzdra (yellow card) 89'	Stadium: Stadion ROSRRiT w Siedlcach; Referee: Piotr Idzik

27 July 2024 2	Chrobry Głogów	0–4	Termalica Nieciecza	Głogów
14:30			Jakubik 55', 79'; Karasek 72' (pen.); Ambrosiewicz 90+2'	Stadium: Głogów Municipal Stadium; Referee: Łukasz Szczech

3 August 2024 3	Wisła Płock	2–1	Chrobry Głogów	Płock
17:00	Sekulski 29' (pen.), 49'		Szarek 77'	Stadium: Kazimierz Górski Stadium; Referee: Łukasz Karski

9 August 2024 4	Chrobry Głogów	0–0	GKS Tychy	Głogów
18:00	Szymon Bartlewicz (yellow card) 90+5'	Report	Ertlthaler (yellow card) 56'	Stadium: Głogów Municipal Stadium; Attendance: 946; Referee: (Poland) Piotr Rzucidło

16 August 2024 5	Stal Stalowa Wola	1–1	Chrobry Głogów	Stalowa Wola
18:00	Szymon Lewkot 27' (o.g.); Strózik (yellow card) 69'	Report	Mucha 14'; Kacper Tabiś (yellow card) 33'; Szymon Lewkot (yellow card) 44'	Stadium: Subcarpathian Football Center; Attendance: 2,705; Referee: (Poland) Albert Różycki

20 August 2024 6	Chrobry Głogów	1–3	Stal Rzeszów	Głogów
20:30	Szarek (yellow card) 52'; Robert Mandrysz (yellow card) 55'; Mateusz Ozimek 74'	Report	Jesús Antonio Díaz Gómez 30' 59'; Michał Synoś (yellow card) 41'; Šimčák (yellow card) 75'; César Peña 86'; Karol Łysiak (yellow card) 90+3'	Stadium: Głogów Municipal Stadium; Attendance: 1,023; Referee: (Poland) Paweł Horożaniecki

25 August 2024 7	ŁKS Łódź	3–0	Chrobry Głogów	Łódź
14:30	Gülen (yellow card) 31'; Andreu Arasa 40' (yellow card) 50'; Mokrzycki 45'; Dankowski (yellow card) 80'; Jędrzej Zając 89'	Report	Szymon Bartlewicz (yellow card) 45+6'	Stadium: Stadion Miejski ŁKS Łódź; Attendance: 6,386; Referee: (Poland) Damian Kos

30 August 2024 8	Chrobry Głogów	1–2	Polonia Warsaw	Głogów
20:30	Lebedyński (yellow card) 18'; Szwedzik 69' (pen.); Bonecki (yellow card) 85'	Report	Wojciechowski (yellow card) 21'; Mucha 42' (o.g.); Szymon Kobusiński 81'	Stadium: Głogów Municipal Stadium; Attendance: 985; Referee: (Poland) Leszek Lewandowski

16 September 2024 9	Znicz Pruszków	2–3	Chrobry Głogów	Pruszków
19:00	Vladyslav Okhronchuk 29' (yellow card) 38'; Daniel Stanclik (yellow card) 48'; Moskwik (yellow card) 68'; Filip Kendzia 82'	Report	Mateusz Stefan Lewandowski 13' 26' 50'; Lebedyński (yellow card) 67'	Stadium: Stadion Znicza Pruszków; Attendance: 597; Referee: (Poland) Paweł Pskit

29 September 2024 11	Arka Gdynia	2–0	Chrobry Głogów	Gdynia
12:00	Kike Hermoso (yellow card) 67'; Czubak 80' 86'; Sidibe (yellow card) 82'	Report	Albert Zarówny (yellow card) 7'; Natan Malczuk (yellow card) 90+2'	Stadium: Stadion GOSiR; Attendance: 7,786; Referee: (Poland) Piotr Rzucidło

=== Polish Cup ===
24 September 2024 First round	Chrobry Głogów	v	Polonia Warsaw	Głogów
18:00				Stadium: Głogów Municipal Stadium
