= Jakub Antczak =

Polish footballer

Personal information
- Date of birth: 29 April 2004 (age 22)
- Place of birth: Wrocław, Poland
- Height: 1.68 m (5 ft 6 in)
- Position: Left winger

Team information
- Current team: Sokół Kleczew
- Number: 27

Youth career
- –2019: FC Wrocław Academy Wrocław
- 2019–2021: Lech Poznań

Senior career*
Years	Team	Apps	(Gls)
2021–2026	Lech Poznań II	78	(8)
2022–2025	Lech Poznań	2	(0)
2023–2024	→ Odra Opole (loan)	32	(1)
2024–2025	→ GKS Katowice (loan)	5	(1)
2025	→ Chrobry Głogów (loan)	13	(0)
2026–	Sokół Kleczew	0	(0)

International career
2018–2019	Poland U15	4	(0)
2020	Poland U16	3	(0)
2022	Poland U18	3	(0)
2022	Poland U19	1	(0)
- * Club domestic league appearances and goals as of 09:41, 4 June 2026 (UTC)

Jakub Antczak (born 29 April 2004) is a Polish professional footballer who plays as a left winger for II liga club Sokół Kleczew.

== Career statistics ==
As of match played 30 May 2026

Appearances and goals by club, season and competition
Club	Season	League			Polish Cup		Europe		Other		Total	
Club	Season	Division	Apps	Goals	Apps	Goals	Apps	Goals	Apps	Goals	Apps	Goals
Lech Poznań II	2021–22	II liga	22	3	1	0	—		—		23	3
Lech Poznań II	2022–23	II liga	26	1	0	0	—		—		26	1
Lech Poznań II	2025–26	III liga, group II	30	4	—		—		—		30	4
Lech Poznań II	Total		78	8	1	0	—		—		79	8
Lech Poznań	2021–22	Ekstraklasa	1	0	0	0	—		—		1	0
Lech Poznań	2022–23	Ekstraklasa	1	0	0	0	0	0	0	0	1	0
Lech Poznań	Total		2	0	0	0	0	0	—		2	0
Odra Opole (loan)	2023–24	I liga	32	1	1	0	—		—		33	1
GKS Katowice (loan)	2024–25	Ekstraklasa	5	1	2	1	—		—		7	2
Chrobry Głogów (loan)	2024–25	I liga	13	0	—		—		—		13	0
Sokół Kleczew	2026–27	II liga	0	0	0	0	—		—		0	0
Career total			130	10	4	1	0	0	0	0	134	11

== Honours ==
Lech Poznań

- Ekstraklasa: 2021–22
