= Berk Neziroğluları =

Turkish footballer (born 1991)

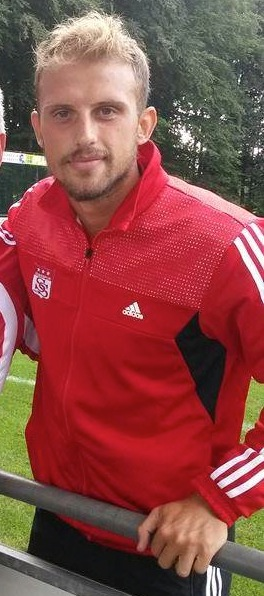
- Neziroğulları in 2014

Personal information
- Date of birth: 1 February 1991 (age 35)
- Place of birth: Beyoğlu, Turkey
- Height: 1.82 m (6 ft 0 in)
- Position: Left-back

Youth career
- 2002–2009: Galatasaray

Senior career*
Years	Team	Apps	(Gls)
2009–2011	Galatasaray	1	(0)
2011–2014	Adanaspor	21	(0)
2014	1461 Trabzon	14	(2)
2014–2015	Sivasspor	3	(0)
2015–2017	Manisaspor	51	(1)
2017–2020	Pendikspor	53	(2)

International career
2006–2007	Turkey U16	6	(0)
2007–2008	Turkey U17	26	(0)
2008–2009	Turkey U18	9	(0)
2009–2010	Turkey U19	8	(0)
- * Club domestic league appearances and goals as of 23:04, 5 March 2023 (UTC)

Berk Neziroğluları (born 1 February 1991) is a Turkish professional footballer who most recently played as a left-back for Pendikspor. He made his Süper Lig debut for Galatasaray against Gençlerbirliği on 16 May 2010.
