= Jakub Karbownik =

Polish footballer (born 2001)

Personal information
- Date of birth: 15 March 2001 (age 25)
- Place of birth: Bełchatów, Poland
- Height: 1.74 m (5 ft 9 in)
- Position: Winger

Team information
- Current team: Star Starachowice

Youth career
- 2010–2015: GKS Bełchatów
- 2015–2019: Lech Poznań

Senior career*
Years	Team	Apps	(Gls)
2019–2021	Lech Poznań II	75	(9)
2022	GKS Katowice	8	(1)
2022–2023	Garbarnia Kraków	27	(4)
2023–2026	Chełmianka Chełm	71	(13)
2026	Olimpia Elbląg	13	(0)
2026–	Star Starachowice	0	(0)

International career
2016	Poland U15	3	(1)
2016–2017	Poland U16	6	(1)
2017–2018	Poland U17	7	(3)
- * Club domestic league appearances and goals as of 22:02, 1 June 2026 (UTC)

Jakub Karbownik (born 15 March 2001) is a Polish professional footballer who plays as a winger for III liga club Star Starachowice.

== Career statistics ==
As of match played 23 May 2026

Appearances and goals by club, season and competition
Club	Season	League			Polish Cup		Continental		Other		Total	
Club	Season	Division	Apps	Goals	Apps	Goals	Apps	Goals	Apps	Goals	Apps	Goals
Lech Poznań II	2018–19	III liga, gr. II	7	0	—		—		—		7	0
Lech Poznań II	2019–20	II liga	20	1	—		—		—		20	1
Lech Poznań II	2020–21	II liga	35	8	1	0	—		—		36	8
Lech Poznań II	2021–22	II liga	13	0	2	0	—		—		15	0
Lech Poznań II	Total		75	9	3	0	—		—		78	9
GKS Katowice	2021–22	I liga	8	1	—		—		—		8	1
Garbarnia Kraków	2022–23	II liga	27	4	0	0	—		—		27	4
Chełmianka Chełm	2023–24	III liga, gr. IV	34	7	—		—		—		34	7
Chełmianka Chełm	2024–25	III liga, gr. IV	31	6	—		—		—		31	6
Chełmianka Chełm	2025–26	III liga, gr. IV	6	0	—		—		—		6	0
Chełmianka Chełm	Total		71	13	—		—		—		71	13
Olimpia Elbląg	2025–26	III liga, gr. I	13	0	—		—		—		13	0
Star Starachowice	2026–27	III liga, gr. IV	0	0	—		—		—		0	0
Career total			194	27	3	0	—		—		197	27

== Honours ==
Lech Poznań II

- III liga, group II: 2018–19
