= Simon Jakobsen =

Danish footballer (born 1990)

Personal information
- Full name: Simon Skou Jakobsen
- Date of birth: 17 November 1990 (age 35)
- Place of birth: Silkeborg, Denmark
- Height: 1.90 m (6 ft 3 in)
- Position: Centre-back

Team information
- Current team: Young Boys FD (Head of Football)

Youth career
- HA85
- Silkeborg

Senior career*
| Years | Team | Apps | (Gls) |
| 2009–2020 | Silkeborg | 203 | (3) |
| 2020–2024 | Hobro | 102 | (5) |

Managerial career
- 2025–: Young Boys FD (Head of Football)
- * Club domestic league appearances and goals

Simon Skou Jakobsen (born 17 November 1990) is a Danish retired professional footballer who played as a centre-back. He is currently employed as Head of Football at Young Boys FD.

== Career ==
=== Silkeborg ===
Jakobsen began playing football for HA85 in Hvinningdal, a neighbourhood in Silkeborg. He was later signed to the Silkeborg IF youth academy and started training regularly with their first team in 2009. He made his debut in the 1st Division on 13 April 2009 in a game against FC Fredericia, when he was substituted on the 85th minute. He continued training with the first team through the fall which paid off with a three-year contract.

Jakobsen had to wait more than one year for his debut in the Danish Superliga on 7 August 2010, when he played in a 0–0 draw against AaB. Jakobsen played four more full games that autumn, and Jim Larsen's transfer to Rosenborg led the way for the young defender to play regularly on the first team. Jakobsen signed a 4 1/2-year contract in the spring of 2011.

=== Hobro ===
On 27 January 2020, Jakobsen joined Hobro IK on a contract for the rest of the season.

On 25 April 2024, Jakobsen announced that he would retire after the season.

== Later career ==
In March 2025, it was confirmed that Jakobsen had been hired as Head of Football at Danish 3rd Division club Young Boys FD.
