= Kamil Kruk =

Polish footballer (born 2000)

Personal information
- Date of birth: 13 March 2000 (age 26)
- Place of birth: Drezdenko, Poland
- Height: 1.85 m (6 ft 1 in)
- Position: Centre-back

Team information
- Current team: Górnik Łęczna
- Number: 74

Youth career
- Lubuszanin Drezdenko
- Maksymilian Gorzów Wielkopolski
- Impuls Wawrów
- 2013–2018: Zagłębie Lubin

Senior career*
| Years | Team | Apps | (Gls) |
| 2018–2024 | Zagłębie Lubin II | 49 | (1) |
| 2020–2024 | Zagłębie Lubin | 31 | (3) |
| 2022–2023 | → Stal Mielec (loan) | 20 | (2) |
| 2024–2025 | Motor Lublin | 17 | (0) |
| 2025– | Górnik Łęczna | 16 | (2) |

International career
| 2015 | Poland U15 | 1 | (0) |
| 2021 | Poland U21 | 3 | (0) |
- * Club domestic league appearances and goals as of 16:15, 26 May 2026 (UTC)

Kamil Kruk (born 13 March 2000) is a Polish professional footballer who plays as a centre-back for II liga club Górnik Łęczna.

== Career ==
=== Youth career ===
During his youth career, he played in Lubuszanin Drezdenko, Maksymilian Gorzów Wielkopolski and in Impuls Wawrów. In the season 2013-14, he started playing in Zagłębie Lubin youth team.

=== Zagłębie Lubin ===
He debuted in Zagłębie Lubin II in a 0–0 home draw against Stal Brzeg on 6 April 2019. During that season, he was assigned with the following squad numbers: 3, 4, 6 and 15. His debut in Ekstraklasa happened over a year later, on 14 July 2014, in a 3–1 home win against Wisła Kraków, during which he came off the bench in the 89th minute, replacing Yevgeni Bashkirov. He scored the first goal in his senior career on 5 December 2021, in the 49th minute of the 2–3 home win against Lech Poznań. In that season, he scored two goals. His contract with Zagłębie was prolonged on 2 July 2022.

=== Loan to Stal Mielec ===
In the 2022–23 season, he was loaned to Stal Mielec on a one-year deal, what was announced on 3 July 2022. In his new club, he was assigned a squad number #74. He debuted there in 1–3 away lose with Górnik Zabrze on 13 August 2022, coming off the bench in the 79th minute, replacing Arkadiusz Kasperkiewicz. During that season, he appeared on the pitch 22 times (he made 20 appearances in Ekstraklasa and two in Polish Cup matches) and scored two goals. Both of them were scored on 30 April 2023 in 2–1 home win against Korona Kielce.

=== Return to Zagłębie ===
In 2023, he returned to Zagłębie. He played nine matches there, from which four of them were played in the main team, four in Zagłębie II and one in Polish Cup.

=== Motor Lublin ===
On 7 January 2024, his transfer to Motor Lublin was announced by his former club. He was transferred on a one-year deal with a clause that allows to prolong his contract until 2026. In Motor, he was assigned with a squad number #74. He debuted in his new club in a 2–0 away lose against GKS Katowice on 19 February 2024.

=== Górnik Łęczna ===
On 4 July 2025, Kruk joined first division club Górnik Łęczna on a season-long deal, with an option for a further year.

== Career statistics ==
As of match played 6 April 2026

Appearances and goals by club, season and competition
| Club | Season | League | | | Polish Cup | | Europe | | Other | | Total | |
| Club | Season | Division | Apps | Goals | Apps | Goals | Apps | Goals | Apps | Goals | Apps | Goals |
|---|---|---|---|---|---|---|---|---|---|---|---|---|
| Zagłębie Lubin II | 2018–19 | III liga, gr. III | 11 | 0 | — | | — | | — | | 10 | 0 |
| Zagłębie Lubin II | 2019–20 | III liga, gr. III | 18 | 0 | 1 | 0 | — | | — | | 19 | 0 |
| Zagłębie Lubin II | 2020–21 | III liga, gr. III | 9 | 0 | — | | — | | — | | 9 | 0 |
| Zagłębie Lubin II | 2021–22 | III liga, gr. III | 7 | 1 | — | | — | | — | | 7 | 1 |
| Zagłębie Lubin II | 2023–24 | II liga | 4 | 0 | 0 | 0 | — | | — | | 4 | 0 |
| Zagłębie Lubin II | Total | | 49 | 1 | 1 | 0 | — | | — | | 50 | 1 |
| Zagłębie Lubin | 2019–20 | Ekstraklasa | 2 | 0 | 0 | 0 | — | | — | | 2 | 0 |
| Zagłębie Lubin | 2020–21 | Ekstraklasa | 12 | 2 | 2 | 0 | — | | — | | 14 | 2 |
| Zagłębie Lubin | 2021–22 | Ekstraklasa | 13 | 1 | 2 | 0 | — | | — | | 15 | 1 |
| Zagłębie Lubin | 2023–24 | Ekstraklasa | 4 | 0 | 1 | 0 | — | | — | | 5 | 0 |
| Zagłębie Lubin | Total | | 31 | 3 | 5 | 0 | — | | — | | 36 | 3 |
| Stal Mielec (loan) | 2022–23 | Ekstraklasa | 20 | 2 | 2 | 0 | — | | — | | 22 | 2 |
| Motor Lublin | 2023–24 | I liga | 13 | 0 | — | | — | | 2 (Note: Appearances in I liga promotion play-offs) | 0 | 15 | 0 |
| Motor Lublin | 2024–25 | Ekstraklasa | 2 | 0 | 0 | 0 | — | | — | | 2 | 0 |
| Motor Lublin | Total | | 15 | 0 | 0 | 0 | — | | 2 | 0 | 17 | 0 |
| Górnik Łęczna | 2025–26 | I liga | 16 | 2 | 1 | 0 | — | | — | | 17 | 2 |
| Career total | | | 131 | 8 | 9 | 0 | — | | 2 | 0 | 142 | 8 |

== Honours ==
Zagłębie Lubin II

- III liga, group III: 2021–22
- Polish Cup (Lower Silesia regionals): 2018–19
- Polish Cup (Legnica regionals): 2018–19
