= Álex Sánchez (footballer, born 1991) =

Spanish footballer

Personal information
- Full name: Alejandro Sánchez Benítez
- Date of birth: 3 February 1991 (age 35)
- Place of birth: Barcelona, Spain
- Height: 1.86 m (6 ft 1 in)
- Position: Goalkeeper

Youth career
- Barcelona

Senior career*
| Years | Team | Apps | (Gls) |
| 2010–2011 | Zaragoza B | 20 | (0) |
| 2011–2012 | Alavés | 2 | (0) |
| 2012–2014 | Badalona | 5 | (0) |
| 2014–2016 | Valencia B | 45 | (0) |
| 2016–2018 | Foggia | 4 | (0) |
| 2018–2019 | Ibiza | 27 | (0) |
| 2019–2023 | Badalona | 72 | (0) |
| 2023–2024 | Cerdanyola del Vallès | 31 | (0) |

International career
| 2007 | Spain U16 | 2 | (0) |
| 2007–2008 | Spain U17 | 6 | (0) |
| 2009 | Spain U18 | 2 | (0) |
| 2010 | Spain U19 | 7 | (0) |
| 2011 | Spain U20 | 3 | (0) |
- * Club domestic league appearances and goals as of 19 May 2024

Alejandro "Álex" Sánchez Benítez (born 3 February 1991) is a Spanish professional footballer who plays as a goalkeeper.
