= Sebastian Bonecki =

Polish football player

Personal information
- Full name: Sebastian Bonecki
- Date of birth: 13 February 1995 (age 31)
- Place of birth: Legnica, Poland
- Height: 1.80 m (5 ft 11 in)
- Positions: Centre-back; midfielder

Team information
- Current team: Zagłębie Lubin
- Number: 14

Youth career
- 2005–2011: Zagłębie Lubin

Senior career*
Years	Team	Apps	(Gls)
2011–2013	Zagłębie Lubin (ME)	29	(2)
2013–2016	Zagłębie Lubin II	54	(8)
2013–2018	Zagłębie Lubin	28	(0)
2016–2017	→ Chrobry Głogów (loan)	27	(5)
2018	→ Odra Opole (loan)	10	(1)
2018–2021	Odra Opole	61	(5)
2021–2022	Bruk-Bet Termalica	34	(0)
2022–2024	Zagłębie Sosnowiec	53	(1)
2024–2026	Chrobry Głogów	49	(2)
2026–	Zagłębie Lubin II	11	(0)
2026–	Zagłębie Lubin	0	(0)

International career
2010	Poland U15	2	(0)
2012	Poland U18	2	(0)
- * Club domestic league appearances and goals as of 15:04, 20 November 2026 (UTC)

Sebastian Bonecki (born 13 February 1995) is a Polish professional footballer who plays as a centre-back or midfielder for Ekstraklasa club Zagłębie Lubin.

== Club career ==
Bonecki made his debut for Zagłębie Lubin in a 1–0 defeat to Cracovia on 23 August 2013.

In 2018, he signed for Odra Opole.

== Honours ==
Zagłębie Lubin

- I liga: 2014–15
