= David Frey =

Swiss footballer (born 1991)

Personal information
- Full name: David Frey
- Date of birth: 8 December 1991 (age 34)
- Place of birth: Switzerland
- Position: Defender

Youth career
- 1999–2005: FC Münsingen
- 2005–2007: FC Thun

Senior career*
Years	Team	Apps	(Gls)
2008–2009	FC Thun	9	(0)
2009–2011	BSC Young Boys U21	50	(2)
2011–2012	FC Thun U21	21	(2)
2012–2014	FC Thun	4	(0)
- * Club domestic league appearances and goals as of 08:51, 3 October 2013 (UTC)

David Frey (born 8 December 1991) is a Swiss footballer. He has no Club since 2016.

== Career ==
David Frey began his career in the 2008/09 season at FC Thun in the Challenge League, for whose professional team he made his debut in Switzerland's second division against FC Gossau on 6 October 2008. Overall, he had nine appearances with the FC Thun, but did not score a goal. His transfer to the BSC Young Boys was announced in July 2009. The midfielder was reportedly awarded a one-year contract. In the 2009/10 season he was a temporary member of the Young Boys' professional squad, but until the end of the season was only employed in their U-21 team in the third highest league, the first division.

His younger brother Michael Frey played in the first team of the BSC Young Boys in 2012-2014 and played since for many different first division teams outside of Switzerland. In June 2021 the striker signed a three-year contract with Royal Antwerp Football Club.
