= Sven Lehmann (footballer) =

Swiss footballer (born 1991)

Personal information
- Full name: Sven Lehmann
- Date of birth: 18 December 1991 (age 34)
- Place of birth: St. Gallen, Switzerland
- Height: 1.83 m (6 ft 0 in)
- Position: Forward

Team information
- Current team: Eschen/Mauren
- Number: 9

Youth career
- Winkeln
- St. Gallen

Senior career*
Years	Team	Apps	(Gls)
2010–2014	St. Gallen II	78	(33)
2010–2014	St. Gallen	12	(4)
2015–2017	Winkeln	24	(25)
2017–2018	Gossau	24	(17)
2018–	Eschen/Mauren	0	(0)

International career
2008	Switzerland U17	1	(0)
2010	Switzerland U19	2	(0)
- * Club domestic league appearances and goals as of 20 August 2016

Sven Lehmann (born 18 December 1991) is a Swiss footballer who plays as a forward for Eschen/Mauren.
