= Turkey national under-17 football team =

National association youth football team

Turkey Under-17
- Nickname: Genç Milliler
- Association: Turkish Football Federation (TFF)
- Confederation: UEFA (Europe)
- Head coach: Selçuk Erdoğan
- Most caps: Cafercan Aksu (41)
- Top scorer: Muhammet Demir (19)
First colours	Second colours

First international
- Romania 2 - 2 Turkey; 10 August 1992

Biggest win
- Turkey 8 - 0 Northern Ireland; London, England, 2 September 2007

Biggest defeat
- Turkey 0 - 5 Romania} 14 August 1993; Turkey 0 - 5 Greece; 20 August 1993

FIFA U-17 World Cup
- Appearances: 3 (first in 2005)
- Best result: Fourth place (2005)

European Championship
- Appearances: 8 (first in 2004)
- Best result: Champions (2005)

The Turkey national under-17 football team is the national under-17 football team of Turkey and is controlled by the Turkish Football Federation.

The team competes in the UEFA European Under-17 Football Championship, held every year. If qualified, the team also competes in the FIFA U-17 World Cup, which has been held annually since 2025. The original tournament was called the UEFA European Under-16 Football Championship (1982-2001). The tournament was renamed as the European Under-17 Football Championship in 2002, but importantly the overall statistics are collated from 1982.

== Competitive record ==
=== UEFA U-17 European Championship Record* ===
Edition	Round	MP	W	D**	L	GF	GA
(Denmark) 2002	Qualifying round	–	–	–	–	–	–
(Portugal) 2003	Qualifying round	–	–	–	–	–	–
(France) 2004	Group stage	3	1	0	2	6	5
(Italy) 2005	Champions^{Q}	5	4	0	1	13	5
(Luxembourg) 2006	Elite round	3	0	1	2	1	3
(Belgium) 2007	Elite round	3	1	0	2	3	2
(Turkey) 2008	Semi-finals	4	2	2	1	5	1
(Germany) 2009	Group stage^{Q}	3	1	0	2	3	5
(Liechtenstein) 2010	Semi-finals	3	0	2	1	2	4
(Serbia) 2011	Elite round	3	1	1	1	4	5
(Slovenia) 2012	Elite round	3	0	0	3	0	9
(Slovakia) 2013	Qualifying round	3	1	0	2	8	8
(Malta) 2014	Group stage	3	1	0	2	7	7
(Bulgaria) 2015	Qualifying round	3	0	0	3	3	10
(Azerbaijan) 2016	Elite round	3	1	0	2	4	7
(Croatia) 2017	Semi-finals^{Q}	5	3	0	2	10	7
(England) 2018	Elite round	3	1	0	2	3	4
(Republic of Ireland) 2019	Elite round	3	0	1	2	1	5
(Estonia) ~~2020~~	Cancelled due to COVID-19 pandemic						
(Cyprus) ~~2021~~	Cancelled due to COVID-19 pandemic						
(Israel) 2022	Group stage	3	0	0	3	2	7
(Hungary) 2023	Elite round	3	1	1	1	6	3
(Cyprus) 2024	Elite round	3	0	1	2	1	6
(Albania) 2025	Round 2 League A	3	0	1	2	3	8
(Estonia) 2026	Round 2 League A	3	1	1	1	4	2
(Latvia) 2027	to be determined						
(Lithuania) 2028	to be determined						
(Moldova) 2029	to be determined						

*The tournament was renamed as the European Under-17 Football Championship in 2002 (The original tournament was called the UEFA European Under-16 Football Championship (1982-2001)). Importantly the overall statistics are collated from 1982.
**Draws include knockout matches decided by penalty shoot-out.
***Gold background colour indicates that the tournament was won. Red border colour indicates tournament was held on home soil.
Q - Denotes qualified for the FIFA U-17 World Cup which is held every odd year.

=== FIFA U-17 World Cup Record ===
Edition	Round	MP	W	D	L	GF	GA
(China) 1985	did not qualify						
(Canada) 1987	did not qualify						
(Scotland) 1989	did not qualify						
(Italy) 1991	did not qualify						
(Japan) 1993	did not qualify						
(Ecuador) 1995	did not qualify						
(Egypt) 1997	did not qualify						
(New Zealand) 1999	did not qualify						
(Trinidad and Tobago) 2001	did not qualify						
(Finland) 2003	did not qualify						
(Peru) 2005	Fourth place	6	4	0	2	15	10
(South Korea) 2007	did not qualify						
(Nigeria) 2009	Quarter finals	5	3	2	0	9	3
(Mexico) 2011	did not qualify						
(United Arab Emirates) 2013	did not qualify						
(Chile) 2015	did not qualify						
(India) 2017	Group stage	3	0	1	2	2	7
(Brazil) 2019	did not qualify						
(Indonesia) 2023	did not qualify						
(Qatar) 2025	did not qualify						
(Qatar) 2026	did not qualify						
(Qatar) 2027	to be determined						
(Qatar) 2028	to be determined						
(Qatar) 2029	to be determined						
Total	3/20	14	7	3	4	26	20

== Individual awards ==
In addition to team victories, Turkish players have won individual awards at UEFA European Under-17 Football Championship.

Year	Golden Player Award
(Turkey) 2005	Nuri Şahin

Year	Top Goalscorer
(Turkey) 2005	Tevfik Kose

== Recent results ==
=== 2026 UEFA European Under-17 Championship ===
==== Qualification ====
15 March 2026	Scotland	2–0	Turkey	The Showgrounds, Coleraine
13:00	Crombie 32'; Cadamarteri 45+1'	Report		Referee: Luca Zufferli (Italy)

18 March 2026	Turkey	4–0	Northern Ireland	The Showgrounds, Coleraine
19:00	Tosun 15'; Yançel 22'; Erdogan 48'; Şen 51' (pen.)	Report		Referee: Márton Rúsz (Hungary)

21 March 2026	Turkey	0–0	Spain	Solitude, Belfast
15:00		Report		Referee: Luca Zufferli (Italy)

== Players ==
=== Current squad ===
The following players were called up for the most recent 2026 UEFA European Under-17 Championship qualification matches.

No.	Pos.	Player	Date of birth (age)	Club
1	GK	Tolga Sancak	10 September 2009 (age 17)	(Turkish Football Federation) Göztepe
12	GK	Emir Gündoğdu	16 October 2009 (age 17)	(Turkish Football Federation) Konyaspor
23	GK	Yüksel Kücük	13 May 2009 (age 17)	(German Football Association) Schalke
4	DF	Bilal Demirağ	27 April 2009 (age 17)	(Turkish Football Federation) Altınordu
5	DF	Ata Yanık	15 May 2009 (age 17)	(Turkish Football Federation) Konyaspor
13	DF	Halil Koç	2 February 2009 (age 17)	(German Football Association) Bayer Leverkusen
15	DF	Eren Taşkıran	1 January 2009 (age 17)	(Turkish Football Federation) Beşiktaş
22	DF	Ramazan Özçelik	1 January 2009 (age 17)	(Turkish Football Federation) Antalyaspor
3	DF	Üveys Yasir Satık	27 June 2009 (age 17)	(Turkish Football Federation) Fenerbahçe
2	DF	Hasan Tuncel	1 January 2009 (age 17)	(Turkish Football Federation) Beşiktaş
6	MF	Efe Seçil	25 January 2009 (age 17)	(Turkish Football Federation) Konyaspor
10	MF	Yakub İlçin	24 March 2009 (age 17)	(Turkish Football Federation) Antalyaspor
8	MF	Oğulcan Yançel	1 June 2009 (age 17)	(Turkish Football Federation) Galatasaray
19	MF	Yağız Şen	11 March 2009 (age 17)	(Turkish Football Federation) Fenerbahçe
17	MF	Efe Fettahoğlu	20 April 2009 (age 17)	(Turkish Football Federation) Fenerbahçe
7	FW	Ali Demirbilek	5 January 2009 (age 17)	(Turkish Football Federation) Fenerbahçe
11	FW	Eymen Erdoğan	19 June 2009 (age 17)	(German Football Association) Köln
14	FW	Güven Atalay	19 August 2009 (age 17)	(Turkish Football Federation) Başakşehir
20	FW	Tarık Buğra Kalpaklı	6 April 2009 (age 17)	(Turkish Football Federation) Fatih Karagümrük
9	FW	Mustafa Coşkun Tosun	6 January 2009 (age 17)	(Turkish Football Federation) Rizespor
16	FW	Eren Sayar	13 January 2009 (age 17)	(Turkish Football Federation) Fenerbahçe

=== Recent call-ups ===
The following players were called up to the national team within the last twelve months and remain eligible for future call-ups.

Pos.	Player	Date of birth (age)	Caps	Goals	Club	Latest call-up

== Past squads ==
UEFA European Under-17 Football Championship squads

- 2004 UEFA European Under-17 Championship squads
- 2005 UEFA European Under-17 Championship squads
- 2008 UEFA European Under-17 Championship squads
- 2009 UEFA European Under-17 Championship squads
- 2010 UEFA European Under-17 Championship squads
- 2014 UEFA European Under-17 Championship squads

FIFA U-17 World Cup squads

- 2005 FIFA U-17 World Cup squad
- 2009 FIFA U-17 World Cup squad
- 2017 FIFA U-17 World Cup squad

== Head-to-head record ==
The following table shows Turkey's head-to-head record in the FIFA U-17 World Cup.

Opponent	Pld	W	D	L	GF	GA	GD	Win %
Australia	1	1	0	0	1	0	+1	100.00
Brazil	1	0	0	1	3	4	−1	0.00
Burkina Faso	1	1	0	0	1	0	+1	100.00
China	1	1	0	0	5	1	+4	100.00
Costa Rica	1	1	0	0	4	1	+3	100.00
Colombia	1	0	1	0	1	1	+0	0.00
Mali	1	0	0	1	0	3	−3	0.00
Mexico	1	1	0	0	2	1	+1	100.00
Netherlands	1	0	0	1	1	2	−1	0.00
New Zealand	2	0	2	0	2	2	+0	0.00
Paraguay	1	0	0	1	1	3	−2	0.00
United Arab Emirates	1	1	0	0	2	0	+2	100.00
Uruguay	1	1	0	0	3	2	+1	100.00
Total	14	7	3	4	26	20	+6	50.00

== See also ==
- Turkey national football team
- Turkey national under-21 football team
- Turkey national under-20 football team
- Turkey national under-19 football team
- Turkey national youth football team
