= Hieronim Barczak =

Polish footballer (born 1953)

Personal information
- Full name: Hieronim Stefan Barczak
- Date of birth: 27 August 1953 (age 73)
- Place of birth: Poznań, Poland
- Height: 1.73 m (5 ft 8 in)
- Position: Defender

Youth career
- –1970: Polonia Poznań

Senior career*
Years	Team	Apps	(Gls)
1970–1971	Przemysław Poznań		
1971	Polonia Poznań		
1972–1986	Lech Poznań	369	(1)
1986–1988	FF Södertälje		

International career
	Poland U21	2	(0)
1980	Poland	8	(0)

Managerial career
- 1990–1991: Lech Poznań II
- 1991–1993: Lech Poznań (assistant)
- 1994–1996: Astra Krotoszyn
- 1996–1998: Postęp Sielinko
- 1999–2001: Obra Zbąszyń
- 2003–2004: Jarota Jarocin
- 2004–2005: Concordia Murowana Goślina
- 2006: Jarota Jarocin
- 2007: Phytopharm Klęka
- 2009: Phytopharm Klęka
- * Club domestic league appearances and goals

Hieronim Stefan Barczak (born 27 September 1953) is a Polish former professional football manager and player who played as a defender. He was also capped 8 times for the Poland national team in 1980.

His football career started in 1967 at Polonia Poznań, before moving to Lech Poznań, where he spent fourteen seasons, most of it as the team's captain. He is the most capped player in Lech's history, with 435 matches played, including 367 top division appearances (167 of which were consecutive), which is also a club record. He moved to Swedish side FF Södertälje in 1986, before his retirement from professional football in 1988.

== Honours ==
Lech Poznań

- Ekstraklasa: 1982–83, 1983–84
- Polish Cup: 1981–82, 1983–84

Individual

- Lech Poznań All-time XI
