= Grunwald Poznań =

Grunwald Poznań can refer to:

- Grunwald, Poznań, a district of the city of Poznań
- Grunwald Poznań (sports club), a multi-sports club
  - Grunwald Poznań (football)
  - Grunwald Poznań (field hockey)
  - Grunwald Poznań (handball)
