= Zbigniew Franiak =

Polish football manager

Personal information
- Date of birth: 18 June 1948 (age 78)
- Place of birth: Poznań, Poland
- Position: Midfielder

Youth career
- 1961–1966: Lech Poznań

Senior career*
Years	Team	Apps	(Gls)
1966–1968	Lech Poznań		
1968–1970	Grunwald Poznań		
1970–1974	Lech Poznań		
1974–1975	Warta Poznań		
1975–1976	Lech Poznań		
1977–1980	Orkan Sokołowo		

Managerial career
- 1995–1996: Lech Poznań
- 1996–1997: Zawisza Bydgoszcz
- 2000: Lech Poznań (caretaker)
- 2004–2005: Luboński KS
- 2005–2006: Jarota Jarocin
- 2006–2007: Sokół Pniewy
- 2007–2008: Polonia Nowy Tomyśl
- 2008–2010: GKS Dopiewo
- * Club domestic league appearances and goals

Zbigniew Franiak (born 18 June 1948) is a Polish former professional football manager and player.

== Honours ==
=== Player ===
Lech Poznań

- III liga, group IV: 1966–67, 1970–71
