= Remigiusz Marchlewicz =

Polish footballer

Personal information
- Date of birth: 15 January 1956 (age 70)
- Place of birth: Poznań, Poland
- Height: 1.81 m (5 ft 11 in)
- Position: Defender

Senior career*
Years	Team	Apps	(Gls)
- Polonia Poznań
- Grunwald Poznań
1978–1982	Lech Poznań	36	(0)
1982–1988	Olimpia Poznań		
1988–1990	Warta Poznań		
1990–1991	Polonia Poznań		
1991–1993	Czarni Wróblewo/Amica Wronki		
1993–1995	Polonia Nowy Tomyśl		

Managerial career
- 1996: Lech Poznań
- 1997: Lech Poznań
- 1998: Lech Poznań (caretaker)
- 1998: Lech Poznań
- 2004–2005: Polonia Poznań
- * Club domestic league appearances and goals

Remigiusz Marchlewicz (born 15 January 1956) is a Polish former professional football manager and player who played as a defender.

== Honours ==
=== Player ===
Lech Poznań

- Polish Cup: 1981–82
