= Józef Adamiec =

Polish footballer (born 1954)

Personal information
- Date of birth: 10 May 1954 (age 72)
- Place of birth: Fosowskie, Poland
- Height: 1.87 m (6 ft 2 in)
- Position: Centre-back

Senior career*
Years	Team	Apps	(Gls)
1973–1977	Małapanew Ozimek		
1977–1981	Odra Opole	91	(6)
1981–1985	Lech Poznań	92	(8)
1985–1988	Wormatia Worms	38	(1)

International career
1981–1984	Poland	9	(1)
- * Club domestic league appearances and goals

Józef Adamiec (born 10 May 1954) is a Polish former professional footballer who played as a centre-back.

His goal against Legia Warsaw on 5 June 1983, to give Lech Poznań a 1–0 victory, was among the decisive factors in Lech Poznań claiming the team's first league title in 1982–83.

Having won several titles with Lech Poznań, he moved to West Germany. Adamiec stated that the move came as a result of match-fixing allegations, and that he was barred by the Polish federation from joining a top-level West German club.

== Honours ==
Lech Poznań

- Ekstraklasa: 1982–83, 1983–84
- Polish Cup: 1983–84
