= Krzysztof Pawlak =

Polish footballer

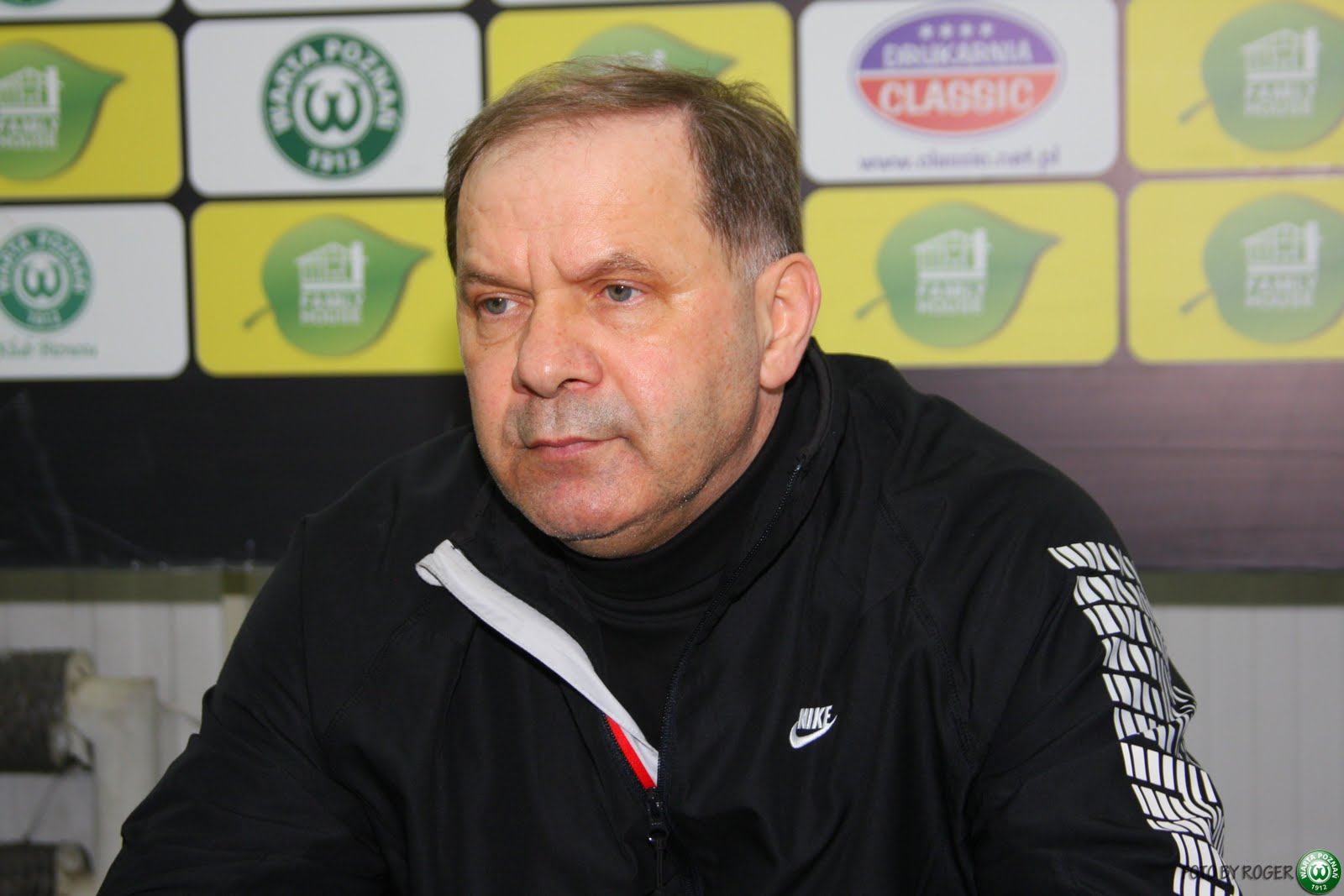
- Pawlak in 2013

Personal information
- Full name: Krzysztof Henryk Pawlak
- Date of birth: 12 February 1958 (age 68)
- Place of birth: Trzebiechów, Poland
- Height: 1.85 m (6 ft 1 in)
- Position: Defender

Senior career*
Years	Team	Apps	(Gls)
1979	Warta Poznań		
1980–1987	Lech Poznań	232	(15)
1988	Lokeren	18	(2)
1988–1992	Trelleborgs FF	59	(1)
1993–1994	Warta Poznań	18	(0)

International career
1983–1987	Poland	31	(1)

Managerial career
- 1994: Sokół Pniewy
- 1994: NKS Niepruszewo
- 1995: Warta Poznań
- 1995–1996: GKS Bełchatów
- 1997: Poland
- 1997–1998: Lech Poznań
- 1998–1999: GKS Bełchatów
- 1999: Aluminium Konin
- 2000–2002: Polonia Środa Wielkopolska
- 2003: Biały Orzeł Koźmin Wlkp.
- 2003–2004: Podbeskidzie Bielsko-Biała
- 2004–2005: Promień Żary
- 2006: Kania Gostyń
- 2009: Arka Nowa Sól
- 2010: Arka Nowa Sól
- 2010–2011: GKP Gorzów Wlkp.
- 2011–2012: Flota Świnoujście
- 2013: Warta Poznań
- 2014: Warta Śrem
- 2014–2015: KKS 1925 Kalisz
- * Club domestic league appearances and goals

Krzysztof Henryk Pawlak (born 12 February 1958 in Trzebiechów) is a Polish former professional footballer who played for clubs such as Warta Poznań, Lech Poznań, KSC Lokeren and Trelleborgs FF.

== Career ==
=== National team ===
He played in the Poland national team (31 matches) and was a participant at the 1986 FIFA World Cup.

==== International goal ====
#	Date	Venue	Opponent	Score	Result	Competition
1.	11 January 1984	Eden Gardens, Kolkata, India	India	0–2	1–2	1984 Nehru Cup

== Managerial career ==
Pawlak later jumped on a coaching career and coached several clubs in Poland.

== Honours ==
Lech Poznań

- Ekstraklasa: 1982–83, 1983–84
- Polish Cup: 1981–82, 1983–84, 1987–88
