= Richard Orlowski =

Polish-born American soccer coach

Personal information
- Full name: Richard Patrick Orlowski
- Birth name: Ryszard Orłowski
- Date of birth: 25 March 1957 (age 69)
- Place of birth: Łódź, Poland
- Position: Forward

Senior career*
Years	Team	Apps	(Gls)
- Gofabet Gorzkowicice
- Piotrcovia Piotrków Trybunalski
- Grunwald Poznań
- Wisła Garfield

Managerial career
- 2013: Nepal (assistant)
- 2015: Anguilla
- 2016–2018: Belize
- * Club domestic league appearances and goals

Richard Patrick Orlowski (born March 25, 1967) is a Polish-American soccer coach.

== Career ==
=== Playing ===
In his native Poland, Orlowski played as a forward for clubs such as Gofabet Gorzkowice, Piotrcovia Piotrków Trybunalski and Grunwald Poznań. Later, in 1984, he fled to Austria to escape from the political regression and the Soviet subjugation of his home country. He was then granted refugee status in New York, anglicized his name from Ryszard Orłowski to Richard, and settled in Pennsylvania. While living in the United States, he played for a succession of Polish-American teams and even had a stint in the Cayman Islands.

=== Nepal ===
Orlowski was selected as Nepal national football team assistant coach along with Polish-American Jack Stefanowski- who was head coach. Their best result was a 2–1 victory over India in the 2013 SAFF Championship, before getting knocked out by Afghanistan en route to the final.

=== Anguilla ===
Orlowski was assigned the Anguilla head coach role in 2015, taking ownership of a team composed of construction workers, bankers, teachers, and boat builders. During his time there, he brought increased professionalism and tactical intuition to the country. Also, he recorded three friendly wins- two against the British Virgin Islands and one versus a non-FIFA nation, Saint Martin by galvanizing the players with the possibility of moving up the World Rankings into performing well. Those three triumphs were Anguilla's first wins in the space of fourteen years.

But when the FIFA World Rankings were updated, Anguilla had not received any points even though the British Virgin Islands were a FIFA nation. FIFA never rectified the error and, when Anguilla had to play Nicaragua for a 2018 World Cup qualifier, they lost twice on a combined score of 8–0; Orlowski resigned after eight months in charge.

=== Belize ===
Assigned Belize manager ahead of the 2017 Copa Centroamericana, he led the Jaguars to a 0–0 draw with Panama in their opening fixture. However, his team lost all their remaining group stage matches after that. His main ambition for the national team is to get youth involved in soccer at a much younger age and also wants more friendlies against better opposition as it would be beneficial to the teams chemistry and quality of play.

He is also involved with the youth sides of the Belize national team from the under-15 level. On account of this, he has drafted some younger players into the senior squad.
