= Henryk Miłoszewicz =

Soviet-born Polish footballer

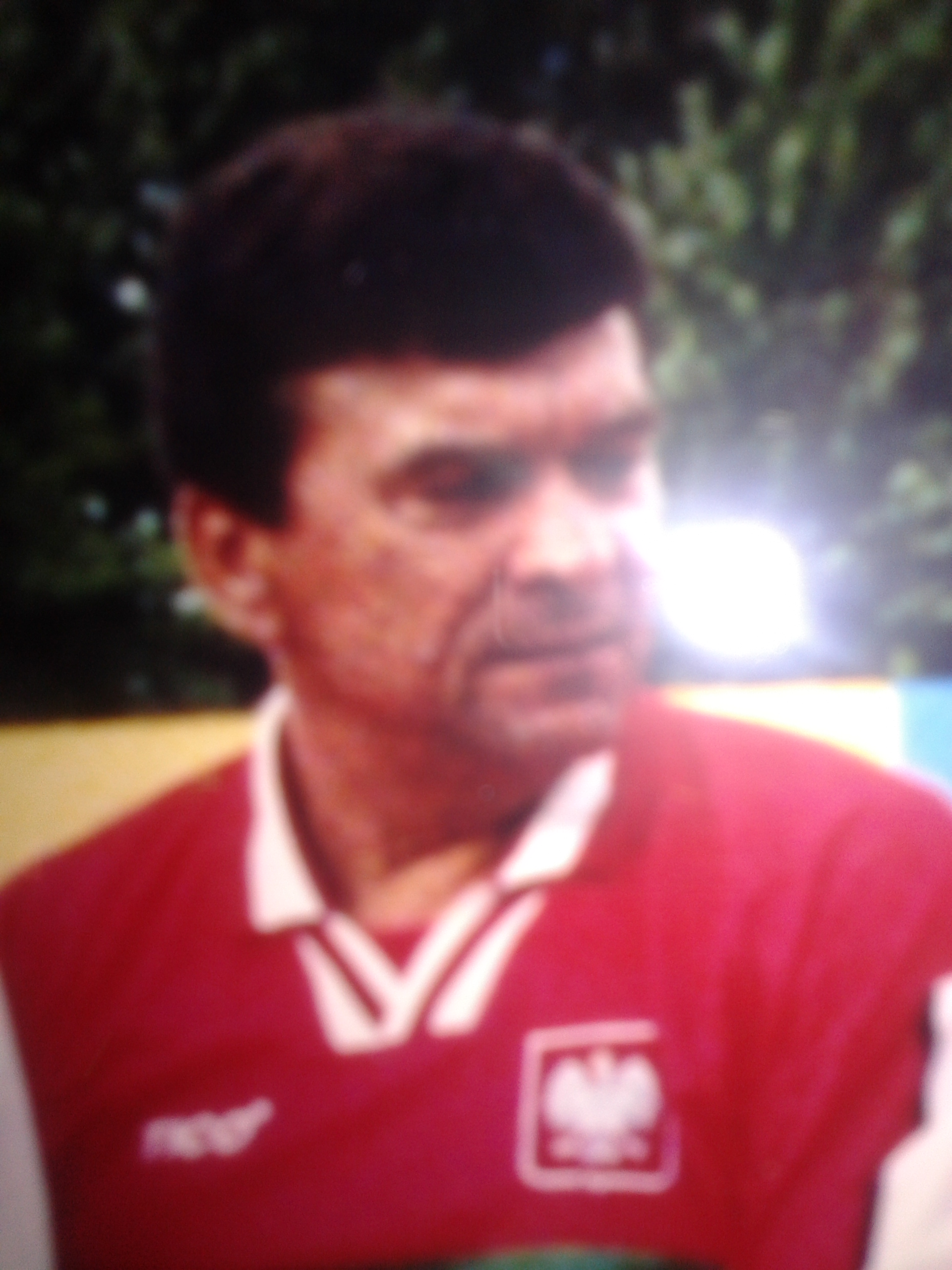

Personal information
- Date of birth: 27 January 1956
- Place of birth: Vilnius, USSR
- Date of death: 5 April 2003 (aged 47)
- Place of death: Włocławek, Poland
- Height: 1.75 m (5 ft 9 in)
- Position: Midfielder

Youth career
- 1967–1974: Zawisza Bydgoszcz

Senior career*
Years	Team	Apps	(Gls)
1974–1975	Zawisza Bydgoszcz		
1976–1980	ŁKS Łódź	105	(17)
1980–1983	Legia Warsaw	89	(20)
1983–1984	Lech Poznań	25	(9)
1984–1986	Le Havre	51	(11)
1986–1987	Lech Poznań	38	(4)
1988	VfL Herzlake		
1988–1991	Stade Torbais		
1993	VfL Herzlake		

International career
1980	Poland	9	(0)

Managerial career
- Polonia Chodzież
- Victoria Września
- –2003: Kujawiak Włocławek
- * Club domestic league appearances and goals

Henryk Miłoszewicz (27 January 1956 – 5 April 2003) was a Polish professional footballer and manager. He played nine times for Poland.

== Honours ==
Legia Warsaw

- Polish Cup: 1979–80, 1980–81

Lech Poznań

- Ekstraklasa: 1983–84
- Polish Cup: 1983–84
