= Włodzimierz Jakubowski =

Polish footballer (1939–2025)

Personal information
- Full name: Włodzimierz Jan Jakubowski
- Date of birth: 14 December 1939
- Place of birth: Poznań, Poland
- Date of death: 10 January 2026 (aged 86)
- Place of death: Poznań, Poland
- Height: 1.75 m (5 ft 9 in)
- Position: Striker

Youth career
- 1953–1958: Lech Poznań

Senior career*
| Years | Team | Apps | (Gls) |
| 1958–1959 | Lech Poznań | | |
| 1959–1961 | Flota Gdynia | | |
| 1961–1969 | Lech Poznań | | |
| 1969–1974 | Polonia Poznań | | |

Managerial career
- Polonia Poznań
- 1975–1977: Mieszko Gniezno
- 1984: Lech Poznań (assistant)
- 1985–1986: Lech Poznań
- 1987: Stal Mielec
- 1987–1988: Bałtyk Gdynia
- 1989–1990: GKS Bełchatów
- 1990–1991: Mieszko Gniezno
- 1991–1993: Kotwica Kórnik
- Dyskobolia Grodzisk Wielkopolski
- Olimpia Poznań
- Tarnovia Tarnowo Podgórne
- * Club domestic league appearances and goals

Włodzimierz Jan Jakubowski (Note: Polish pronunciation: [vwɔˈd͡ʑimjɛʂ ˈjan jakuˈbɔfski].) (14 December 1939 – 10 January 2026) was a Polish football player and manager who played as a striker.

Both his playing and managerial careers were strongly associated with his hometown club Lech Poznań. As a player he was considered a prolific goalscorer, although his playing career coincided with Lech's struggles in the league pyramid.

As a manager he oversaw the club's golden period in the 1980s. He also managed multiple other clubs, however mostly for short stints in lower divisions.

== Early and personal life ==
Jakubowski was born in Poznań on 14 December 1939.

He grew up opposite the Dębiec Stadium where Lech Poznań used to play and was involved with and supported the club his whole life.

== Playing career ==
Jakubowski joined his hometown club Lech Poznań at age 14.

He made his senior debut against Marymont Warsaw in 1958. He went on to play for Lech for many years, of which 24 appearances and 1 goal were in the 1962–63 season of the Ekstraklasa. However, his playing career coincided with Lech's time in the lower divisions, where he was a prolific goalscorer, most notably scoring five goals in a 9–0 win over Vitcovia Witkowo on 5 April 1965.

His time at Lech was only interrupted by a two-year stint at army club Flota Gdynia due to the mandatory conscription (obligatory for all men at the time) and at the end of his playing career where he joined Polonia Poznań.

== Managing career ==
At Lech Poznań, Jakubowski became an assistant coach to Wojciech Łazarek, and in 1984, Lech won a historic double, their biggest success to date.

At the end of the 1984–85 season and throughout the 1985–86 season, as well as in the autumn of 1986, he independently managed them, which during the squad rebuild they secured a high fourth-placed finish in the league twice.

After his successes at Lech, Stal Mielec hired Jakubowski in January 1987 after Zenon Książek left them in the Ekstraklasa relegation zone after the first half of the season. However, Jakubowski fared no better and Stal were relegated after only 3 wins (against Lechia Gdańsk, Górnik Wałbrzych and Olimpia Poznań) in the spring half of the season.

After Stal, he went on to manage other clubs such as Olimpia Poznań, Dyskobolia Grodzisk Wielkopolski, Tarnovia Tarnowo Podgórne, GKS Bełchatów, Kotwica Kórnik and Mieszko Gniezno. With Kotwica, he earned a historic promotion to the second tier. He had two stints at Mieszko; between 1975 and 1977 and one more later in his career, in the 1990–91 season, which followed the single season at GKS Bełchatów (1989–90 season).

== Death ==
Jakubowski died on 10 January 2026, at the age of 86.
