= Andrzej Mazurkiewicz =

Andrzej Mazurkiewicz can refer to the following persons:

- Andrzej Mazurkiewicz (chemist)
- Andrzej Mazurkiewicz (politician)
- Andrzej Mazurkiewicz (footballer)
