= Lagiewka =

Łagiewka or Łągiewka is a Polish surname. Notable people with the surname include:

- Adam Łagiewka (born 1982), Polish footballer
- Krzysztof Łągiewka (born 1983), Polish footballer
