= Andrzej Strugarek =

Polish footballer

Personal information
- Date of birth: 25 October 1958 (age 68)
- Place of birth: Drezdenko, Poland
- Height: 1.82 m (6 ft 0 in)
- Position: Defender

Senior career*
Years	Team	Apps	(Gls)
1970–1973	Łucznik Strzelce Krajeńskie		
1973–1979	Zastal Zielona Góra		
1979–1984	Lech Poznań	71	(1)
1984	GKS Katowice	1	(0)

Managerial career
- 1988–1991: Lech Poznań
- * Club domestic league appearances and goals

Andrzej Strugarek (born 25 October 1958) is a Polish former professional football manager and player who played as a defender.

== Honours ==
=== Player ===
Lech Poznań

- Ekstraklasa: 1982–83
- Polish Cup: 1981–82

=== Manager ===
Lech Poznań

- Ekstraklasa: 1989–90
- Polish Super Cup: 1990
