= Andrzej Mazurkiewicz (footballer) =

Polish footballer (1941–2023)

Personal information
- Date of birth: 20 April 1941
- Place of birth: Poznań, Poland
- Date of death: 14 March 2023 (aged 81)
- Place of death: Poznań, Poland
- Height: 1.72 m (5 ft 8 in)
- Position: Winger

Senior career*
Years	Team	Apps	(Gls)
1955–1961	Lech Poznań	8+	(1+)
- Śląsk Wrocław
- Grunwald Poznań
1963–1968	Lech Poznań		
- * Club domestic league appearances and goals

Andrzej Mazurkiewicz (20 April 1941 – 14 March 2023) was a Polish footballer who played as a winger.

== Career ==
Born in Poznań, Mazurkiewicz started his career at his hometown club Lech Poznań in 1955. He spent his whole career with them, with the exception of two years in the early 1960s where he was forcibly called up to the army (for a mandatory two-year military service was the norm at the time), therefore having to spend this time at one of the military sports clubs; he first went to Śląsk Wrocław and then Grunwald Poznań.

His career high came in 1961 noting eight appearances and one goal in the Ekstraklasa with Lech Poznań.

He was linked to Lech for over 60 years, as after he retired from playing he was the stadium sound and lighting engineer at the club. Having been in the role so long, he did this at the three stadiums Lech played at throughout the years; Dębiec Stadium, Edmund Szyc Stadium and Bułgarska Street Stadium.
