= Mieczysław Tarka =

Polish footballer (1919–1976)

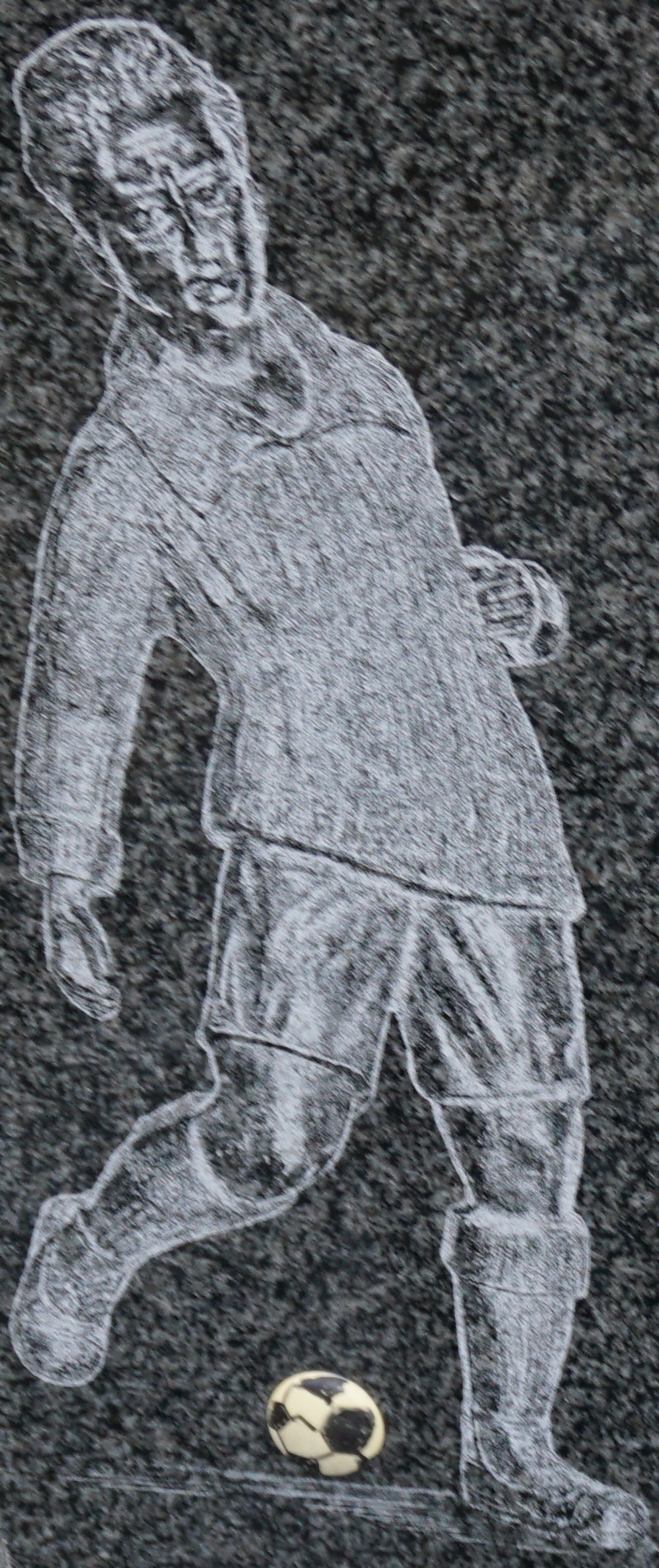
- Mieczysław Tarka's grave at the Miłostowo Cemetery in Poznań

Personal information
- Date of birth: 11 December 1919
- Place of birth: Poznań, Poland
- Date of death: 7 February 1976 (aged 56)
- Place of death: Poznań, Poland
- Height: 1.85 m (6 ft 1 in)
- Position: Defender

Senior career*
Years	Team	Apps	(Gls)
1932–1939	KPW Poznań		
1945–1953	Kolejarz Poznań		

International career
1948–1949	Poland	2	(0)

Managerial career
- 1954–1957: Lech Poznań
- 1957–1961: Olimpia Poznań
- 1961–1962: Lech Poznań
- 1966–1968: Lech Poznań
- * Club domestic league appearances and goals

Mieczysław Tarka (11 December 1919 – 7 February 1976) was a Polish footballer and manager.

He made two appearances for the Poland national team from 1948 to 1949.

== Honours ==
=== Manager ===
Lech Poznań

- III liga, group IV: 1966–67
