= Henryk Czapczyk =

Polish footballer and coach

Personal information
- Date of birth: 27 August 1922
- Place of birth: Poznań, Poland
- Date of death: 30 August 2010 (aged 88)
- Place of death: Poznań, Poland
- Height: 1.77 m (5 ft 10 in)
- Position: Striker

Senior career*
Years	Team	Apps	(Gls)
1935–1939	HCP Poznań		
1946–1948	Warta Poznań		
1949–1953	Lech Poznań		

Managerial career
- 1959–1961: Lech Poznań
- 1964: Lech Poznań
- * Club domestic league appearances and goals

Henryk Czapczyk (27 August 1922 – 30 August 2010) was a Polish footballer who played as a striker.

Czapczyk was born at Poznań and started his football career at HCP Poznań. During World War II, he was a Home Army soldier, eventually reaching the rank of lieutenant. He commanded an assault unit during the Warsaw Uprising; after its fall, he was imprisoned in several German camps, before being liberated in May 1945.

He returned to Poland in 1946 to continue his football career. That year, as Warta's captain, he led the team to a second-place finish in the championship and the national title the following year. In 1949, he joined Lech Poznań, where he remained until his retirement in 1953.

== Honours ==
=== Player ===
Warta Poznań

- Ekstraklasa: 1947

=== Manager ===
Lech Poznań

- II liga North: 1960

=== Orders ===
- Silver Cross of the Virtuti Militari
- Cross of Valour (twice)
- Cross of Merit with Swords
- Cross of the Home Army
- Partisan Cross
- Army Medal
- Victory and Freedom of 1945 Medal
- Grunwald Badge
