= Zygfryd Słoma =

Polish footballer

Personal information
- Date of birth: 28 October 1927
- Place of birth: Poznań, Poland
- Date of death: 24 February 2007 (aged 79)
- Place of death: Poznań, Poland
- Height: 1.83 m (6 ft 0 in)
- Position: Midfielder

Senior career*
Years	Team	Apps	(Gls)
1945–1961	Lech Poznań	277	(19)

International career
1950	Poland	2	(0)

Managerial career
- 1962–1987: Lech Poznań (youth)
- 1962–1963: Lech Poznań
- 1964–1965: Lech Poznań
- * Club domestic league appearances and goals

Zygfryd Słoma (28 October 1927 – 24 January 2007) was a Polish professional footballer who played as a midfielder. He made two appearances for the Poland national team in 1950.

== Honours ==
=== Manager ===
Lech Poznań

- Regional league Poznań: 1964–65
