= Roman Jakóbczak =

Polish footballer and manager

Personal information
- Full name: Roman Józef Jakóbczak
- Date of birth: 26 February 1946 (age 80)
- Place of birth: Września, Poland
- Height: 1.77 m (5 ft 10 in)
- Position: Midfielder

Youth career
- Zjednoczeni Września
- 1965–1966: Czarni Żagań

Senior career*
Years	Team	Apps	(Gls)
1966–1969	Śląsk Wrocław	35	(9)
1969–1971	Pogoń Szczecin	37	(11)
1971–1976	Lech Poznań	112	(33)
1976–1977	Châteauroux		
1977–1978	Red Star		
1978–1979	Rouen	21	(4)
1979–1980	Perpignan		
1980–1981	Lech Poznań	0	(0)

International career
1974–1976	Poland	5	(2)

Managerial career
- 1993: Lech Poznań
Medal record
Men's football
Representing Poland
FIFA World Cup
Third place	1974 West Germany
- * Club domestic league appearances and goals

Roman Józef Jakóbczak (born 26 February 1946) is a Polish former professional footballer who played as a midfielder. He was a member of Poland national team with which he participated in the 1974 FIFA World Cup. He spent the majority of his career with Lech Poznań. After retiring, he became a manager.

== Honours ==
=== Player ===
Poland

- FIFA World Cup third place: 1974

Individual

- Lech Poznań All-time XI

=== Manager ===
Lech Poznań

- Ekstraklasa: 1992–93
