= Walenty Czarnecki =

Polish footballer (1941–2020)

Personal information
- Date of birth: 19 November 1941
- Place of birth: Chodzież, Poland
- Date of death: 19 December 2020 (aged 79)
- Place of death: Wrocław, Poland
- Height: 1.70 m (5 ft 7 in)
- Position: Midfielder

Youth career
- Polonia Chodzież

Senior career*
Years	Team	Apps	(Gls)
- Polonia Chodzież
1961	Grunwald Poznań		
1962–1972	Śląsk Wrocław	100+	(3+)
1972–1973	Odra Wrocław		
- * Club domestic league appearances and goals

Walenty Czarnecki (19 November 1941 – 19 December 2020) was a Polish professional footballer who played mainly as a midfielder. He has spent the vast majority of his career with Śląsk Wrocław, making 100 appearances and scored three goals in the top flight for them.

== Honours ==
Śląsk Wrocław

- II liga: 1963–64
