= Adam Łagiewka =

Polish footballer

Personal information
- Date of birth: 8 January 1982 (age 44)
- Place of birth: Poland
- Height: 1.81 m (5 ft 11 in)
- Position: Striker

Senior career*
Years	Team	Apps	(Gls)
–2001	Chrobry Głogów		
2001–2003	Zagłębie Lubin	3	(0)
2002–2003	→ Nysa Zgorzelec (loan)		
2004	Polonia Słubice		
2004–2005	Górnik Polkowice	31	(1)
2006	Arka Nowa Sól		
2006–2007	Jarota Jarocin		
2007–2009	Tur Turek	55	(2)
2009	Stal Stalowa Wola	5	(0)
2010	Jarota Jarocin	8	(0)
2011–2012	Polonia/Sparta Świdnica	17	(2)
2012–2014	Płomień Makowice		
2014–2019	Zjednoczeni Żarów		
2019–2021	Płomień Makowice	10	(1)
2021–2024	Zjednoczeni Żarów	72	(5)
- * Club domestic league appearances and goals

Adam Łagiewka (born 8 January 1982) is a Polish former professional footballer who played as a striker.

Łagiewka began his professional career with Zagłębie Lubin in the Ekstraklasa during the 2001–02 season, appearing in three matches.
