= Lech Poznań =

Polish football club

- Full name: Kolejowy Klub Sportowy Lech Poznań S.A.
- Nicknames: Kolejorz (The Railwayman); Pyry (Greater Poland potatoes); KKS; Duma Wielkopolski (The Pride of Greater Poland); Poznańska Lokomotywa (The Poznań Locomotive)
- Founded: 19 March 1922; 104 years ago (as KS Lutnia Dębiec)
- Ground: Poznań Stadium
- Capacity: 42,837
- Owner(s): Piotr Rutkowski (66,66%); Maja Rutkowska (33,33%)
- Co-chairmen: Karol Klimczak; Piotr Rutkowski
- Head coach: Niels Frederiksen
- League: Ekstraklasa
- 2025–26: Ekstraklasa, 1st of 18 (champions)
- Website: www.lechpoznan.pl
Home colours	Away colours	Third colours

Kolejowy Klub Sportowy Lech Poznań (lit. 'Railway Sports Club Lech Poznań'), commonly referred to as KKS Lech Poznań or simply Lech Poznań (Polish pronunciation: [lɛx ˈpɔznaj̃]), is a Polish professional football club based in Poznań and currently competing in the Ekstraklasa, the nation's highest division.

The club was established on 19 March 1922 as KS Lutnia Dębiec, later changing its name several times. Until 1994, the club was closely linked to Polish State Railways (PKP). As a result, its popular nickname is Kolejorz [kɔˈlɛjɔʂ], which means The Railwayman in local slang. The club's debut in the Polish top division took place in the year 1948. The brightest era of Lech was in the early 1980s and early 1990s when they won 5 Polish league titles, 3 Polish Cups and a Polish Super Cup. Lech has won the Polish league a total of ten times, most recently in 2026, and is the most popular football club in the Greater Poland region.

== Names ==
Years	Name
1920–1922	KS Lutnia Dębiec
1922–1925	TS Liga Dębiec
1925–1930	TS Liga Poznań
1930–1933	KS KPW Poznań Dworzec
1933–1945	KS KPW Poznań
1945–1948	KKS Poznań
1948–1949	KS ZZK Poznań
1949–1957	ZS Kolejarz Poznań
1957	KS Lech Poznań
1957–1994	KKS Lech Poznań
1994–1998	PKP Lech Poznań
1998–2006	WKP Lech Poznań
2006–	KKS Lech Poznań

== History ==
=== Formation and early years (1920–1945) ===
In August 1920, a group of young teenagers from the Catholic Youth Association decided to split off and form their own football team. The founders of the club were: Jan Nowak, Antoni Dyzman, Jan Dyzman, Leon Nowicki, Józef Magdziak, Kazimierz Zmuda, Stanisław Nowicki, Stefan Fiedler, Józef Gośliński, Leon Stachowski, Józef Blumreder and Jan Wojtek. The origin of Lech can be traced back to 19 March 1922, when it was officially registered as a football club. The club's first official name was Towarzystwo Sportowe Liga Dębiec. In September 1922 the club gained a football pitch on Grzybowa street. The first match for the club was played in May 1922 against Urania Starołęka, which ended in a 1–1 draw. The club started its foundation in a low tier league, which at the time was the Class C.

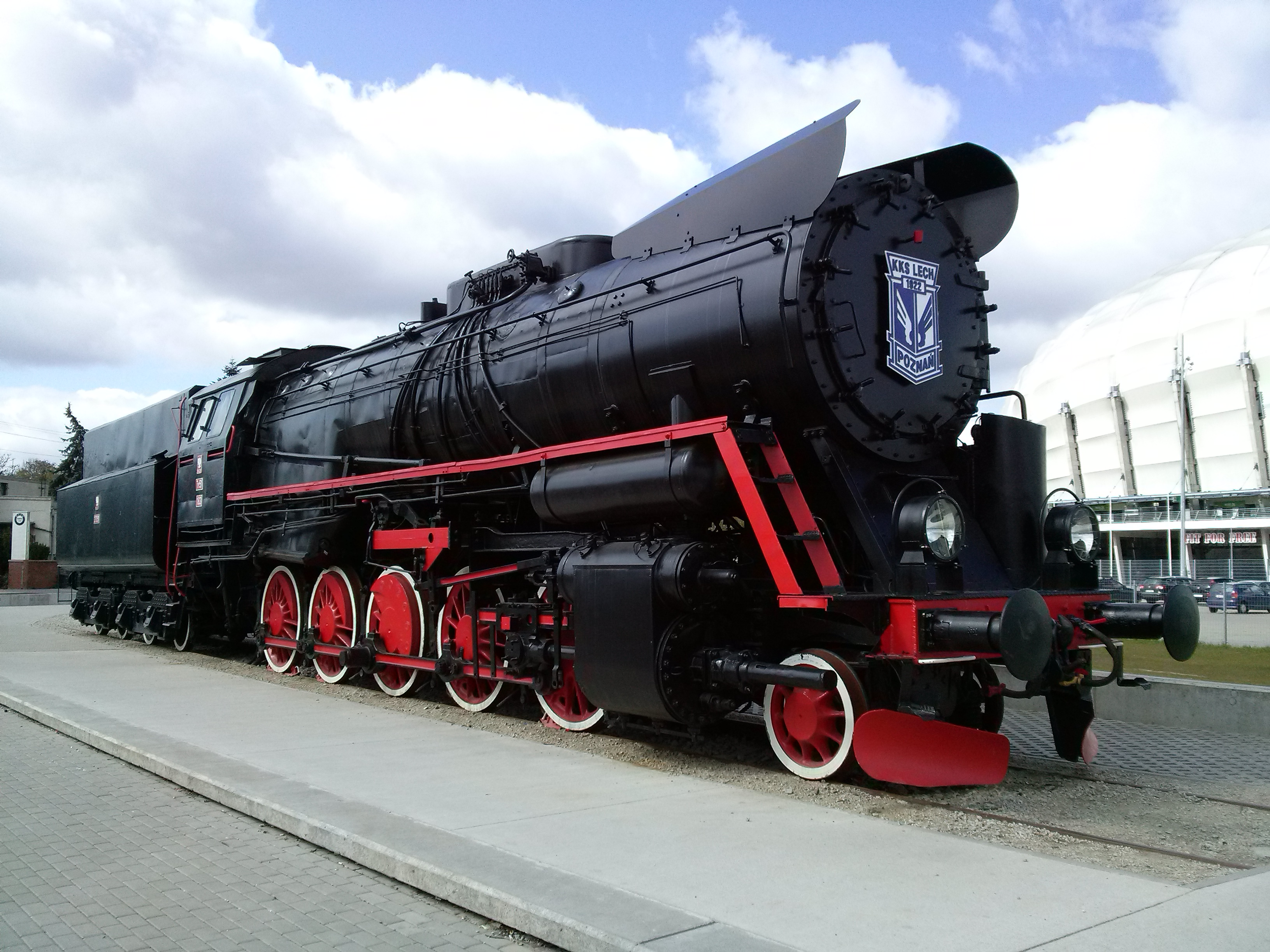
Historic Ty51 steam locomotive with the Lech Poznań crest, representing the club's traditions, by the stadium in Poznań

The club achieved promotion in 1928 to the Class B after six years of being in Class C. In 1932 the club was promoted to Class A where the biggest teams of the region played. From there they could get promoted to the First National Division, but the club would not achieve that goal before the outbreak of World War II. In autumn of 1933 the Klub Sportowy Kolejowego Przysposobienia Wojskowego Poznań ("Poznań Military Training Railway Sports Club") was founded or KPW. In 1945, shortly after the war ended, sporting officials made Lech the first club from the city.

=== Downfall and the Miracle of Błażejewko (1947–1979) ===
In 1947, the Polish Football Association (PZPN) decided to create the first national division (Ekstraklasa). At first, the club was not admitted to the top flight, but the Kolejorz ("the railwayman", the popular nickname of the club) filed an appeal and the PZPN decided, in a special meeting, to extend the First Division to 14 teams, including the KKS (at that time called Kolejowy Klub Sportowy Poznań) and Widzew Łódź. The first match was against Widzew Łódź, lost 3–4.

The club changed its name again in January 1957, this time to Klub Sportowy Lech Poznań and in December to Kolejowy Klub Sportowy Lech Poznań, which lasted throughout the history of the team. That same year turned out to be one of the worst for the club, since it finished last and was relegated to the second division. Lech only gained twelve points in 22 games, despite having striker Teodor Anioła, the club's top scorer, with 141 goals and top scorer of the Polish championship in three consecutive editions (1949–1951). Along with Edmund Białas and Henryk Czapczyk, Anioła formed the famous trio known as ABC. During that period, the club managed to finish third in the top division twice, as the best result, before its relegation to second division.

Lech managed to return to the top division in 1961, but after two seasons with poor results, the blue team was relegated again in 1963. The club was even demoted to the third division, then known as the Interprovincial Division (Liga międzywojewódzka), in one of the biggest sports crisis of the organization. In 1972 the club returned to the first division, in which they had to fight again to avoid relegation every season. Coach Jerzy Kopa, who arrived from Szombierki Bytom, was responsible for reviving Lech spectacularly. He took over the team in 1976, when they were bottom of the table. Kopa gathered players at a training camp in Błażejewko, saved the team from relegation and twelve months later qualified for the first time to play in Europe after finishing third in the league, just two points behind the champion, Wisła Kraków. Therefore, this transformation became known as The Miracle of Błażejewko. The club's first participation in the UEFA Cup in 1978–79 was brief, as they were eliminated in the first round by MSV Duisburg.

=== Golden age of Lech (1980–1993) ===
The arrival of coach Wojciech Łazarek in 1980 at the club was key to overcome third place and European participation. That year the team reached the final of the Polish Cup for the first time, losing 0–5 to Legia Warsaw in Częstochowa. Two years later, the club managed to win the first title in its history, the Polish Cup, by defeating Pogoń Szczecin 1–0 in Wrocław.

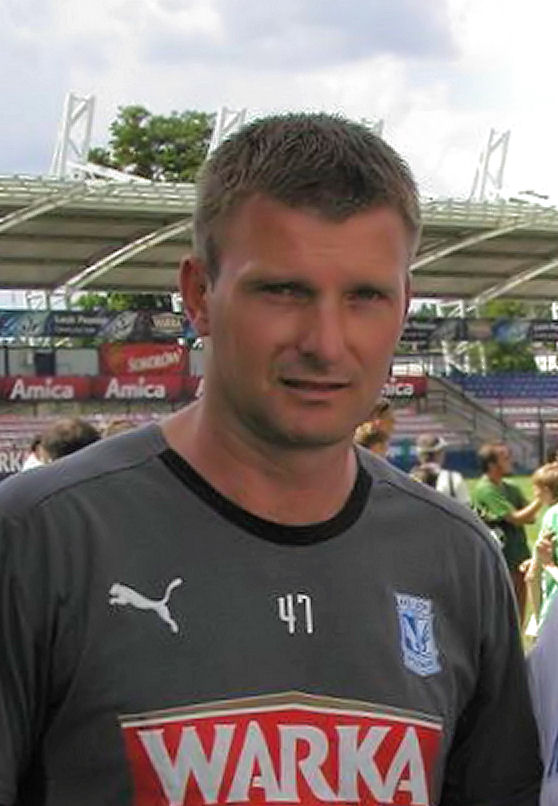
The striker Andrzej Juskowiak, top goalscorer and champion in the Ekstraklasa in 1990 with 18 goals.

The league championships of 1983 and 1984 went down in history as they were the first two league titles of the Kolejorz and for winning on such tight margins against Widzew Łódź. The first league championship for Lech was a point of advantage (39) over Widzew (38). The 15 goals scored by the top scorer of the tournament, Mirosław Okoński and the participation of other players like Krzysztof Pawlak and Józef Adamiec were very important to win their first league championship. Meanwhile, the championship of the following season both teams staged an exciting tournament and tied at 42 points. Lech defended championship by having a better difference of goals than Widzew to break the tie. That season was historic for the blue team, as they got their first double by becoming champions of the Polish Cup, after winning in the final at Wisła Kraków (3–0).

As Polish champions, Lech participated for the first time in the European Cup, although they could not pass the first round in the two seasons. In its first season it was eliminated by Athletic Club. In the first leg in Poland, Mariusz Niewiadomski and Mirosław Okoński scored the first two Lech goals in the tournament and the team won 2–0. However, the return match in San Mamés was a nightmare for the Poles and the Spanish team qualified by winning 4–0. The following season the team faced the current champion, Liverpool F.C., who won by a 5–0 aggregate.

In 1988, Lech won another Cup by beating Legia in Łódź in the penalty shootout. In the second round of the European Cup, Lech faced Barcelona, coached by Johan Cruyff. After finishing the two games in a 1–1 draw, Barcelona, in the end the tournament, could only eliminate Lech in the penalty shootout.

Jerzy Kopa returned to Lech in 1990 along with Andrzej Strugarek and Kolejorz returned to be proclaimed league champions for the third time. Andrzej Juskowiak was the top scorer of the tournament with 18 goals and his team finished with 42 points, two more than the runner-up, Zagłębie Lubin. Henryk Apostel, however, was the coach who led Lech to two new championships in 1992 and 1993. The first one was achieved with a win over GKS Katowice, while the second one tied in points with the second team, Legia, and only won because Legia was penalized for disputed match fixing.
In the autumn of 1990, Lech played one of the most spectacular qualifiers of the last decade in the European Cup. At Bułgarska street stadium the Polish club defeated Olympique Marseille 3–2 in the first leg of the second round. The return match at the Stade Vélodrome, the French team, thrashed Lech 6–1, in a match in which most of the Polish players complained of food poisoning. Since 1993 the club entered into a major financial crisis and had to sell its most important players to continue in professional football.

=== New disappointments and successes (1994–present) ===
Lech managed to stay in the middle of the table and their best result was fourth place in 1999, which allowed them to play in the 1999–00 UEFA Cup, where they eliminated Liepājas Metalurgs in the qualifying round and were defeated by IFK Göteborg in the first round. However, just a few months later, in 2000, Lech was relegated to the second division after 28 years of presence in the top flight. Lech's first season in the second division was a disaster, as they were very close to falling to the third division. It was only with a great effort that the club was saved from relegation and even won the promotion the next season to the first division.

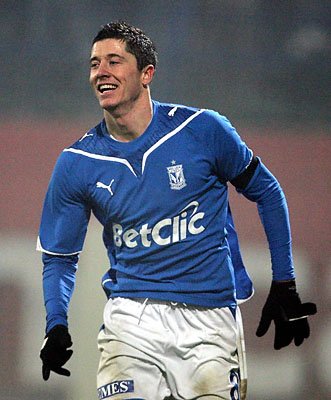
Robert Lewandowski scored 32 goals in 58 matches with Lech Poznań (2008–2010).

In their first year of the return to the I league (2002–03) Lech focused on ensuring permanence. The following season began with a very negative dynamic for the Kolejorz. After five days, the club hired a new coach, Czesław Michniewicz. The unexpected appointment of the young coach turned out to be a shock, since Lech finished the season in sixth position. Most important, however, was the conquest of a Polish Cup by defeating their great rival, Legia Warsaw, in the final two games in 2004. Several days later, the fans in Poznań celebrated the victory of Lech in the Super Cup against Wisła Kraków. Although the next two seasons did not bring any success of that proportion, Lech managed to finish at the top of the table of each season with coach Franciszek Smuda.

Smuda formed a strong team with the arrival at the club of players like Robert Lewandowski, Hernan Rengifo, Semir Štilić, Marcin Zając and Rafał Murawski. In the Ekstraklasa 2008–09 season, Lech had a great season and finished in third place and qualified for the UEFA Europa League thanks, in part, to the 14 goals scored by Robert Lewandowski. On 19 May 2009, Lech won the Cup for the fifth time by beating Ruch Chorzów with a solo goal by Sławomir Peszko at Stadion Śląski.

The following season, Jacek Zieliński replaced Franciszek Smuda, who was hired as the manager of the Poland national team. With many of the players who achieved third place and the cup last season, Zieliński managed to lead Lech to the sixth championship in their history in the 2009–10 season. The striker Robert Lewandowski returned to be a reference in attack and was top scorer of the championship with 18 goals. In their participation in the 2010–11 Champions League, they were eliminated by Sparta Prague in the third round and without Lewandowski, who was transferred to Borussia Dortmund. One of their most successful European appearance was in the 2010–11 UEFA Europa League, in which they eliminated Dnipro Dnipropetrovsk to enter the group stage of the tournament for the first time. Lech finished second in their group with Manchester City, leaving Juventus and FC Salzburg out of the tournament. However, they were eliminated by S.C. Braga, runner-up of the tournament months later, in the round of 32 after winning in Poland (1–0) and losing in Portugal (2–0).

After crashing out of UEFA Europa League qualifying rounds in August 2014, Maciej Skorża replaced Mariusz Rumak as manager. At the end of the 2014–15 season, Lech claimed their seventh league title.

In the 2021–22 season, during which Lech celebrated its 100th anniversary, the team again led by Maciej Skorża finished runners-up in the Polish Cup, losing 3–1 against Raków Częstochowa, and won the club's eighth championship, their first in seven years.

Skorża left the team shortly after, citing personal reasons, and was replaced by Dutchman John van den Brom for the 2022–23 season. Lech crashed out of the UEFA Champions League first qualifying round after losing to Azerbaijani side Qarabağ 1–5 on aggregate. The team went on to have a successful UEFA Europa Conference League campaign, reaching second place in the group stage which included Villarreal, Austria Wien and Hapoel Be'er Sheva, then eliminating Nordic teams Bodø/Glimt and Djurgårdens IF to reach the quarter-finals, where their successful run ended after a 4–6 defeat on aggregate to Fiorentina. They were the first Polish team to win a knockout phase round of a European competition that took place after the winter break since Legia Warsaw in 1991, and the first to move through two post-winter rounds since Górnik Zabrze in 1970.

The following 2023–24 campaign was marked by disappointment. Lech failed to progress past the third qualifying round of the Europa Conference League, losing to Slovak side Spartak Trnava 3–4 on aggregate, despite winning the first game at home 2–1. In December 2023, trailing in the league by eight points by the winter break, van den Brom was dismissed and replaced with Mariusz Rumak, returning to the role after nine-and-a-half years. Lech's form did not improve under Rumak; they were unable to take the lead in the table, lost to lower-placed teams Puszcza Niepołomice and Ruch Chorzów, and were eliminated from the 2023–24 Polish Cup after conceding in the 119th minute of a quarter-final match against Pogoń Szczecin. Still in title contention with three games to go, Lech finished the season in 5th after losing at home to Korona Kielce on 25 May, hours after their reserve team was demoted to the fourth division, allowing Korona to stay in the top-flight in lieu of Lech's neighbors Warta.

For the 2024–25 season, Lech appointed Niels Frederiksen as manager, with the goal of reclaiming the Polish title. After finishing 2024 on top of the table, Lech fell behind Raków Częstochowa early into 2025. Following a late surge in form, and a 1–0 home win against Piast Gliwice in the last matchday of the season, Lech won their ninth league title, their second in the last three years.

Ahead of the 2025–26 season, Lech reinforced their roster with several signings, including winger Luis Palma, striker Yannick Agnero, and last season's Ekstraklasa Defender of the Season Mateusz Skrzypczak, while also facing long-term injuries of key players Patrik Wålemark, Ali Gholizadeh and Radosław Murawski. Their season began with a 2025 Polish Super Cup loss to Legia Warsaw on 13 July. After crashing out of UEFA Champions League and UEFA Europa League qualifying, Lech entered the UEFA Conference League league phase, where they finished 11th to advance to the knockout stages. Lech ended their European campaign when they were eliminated in the round of 16 by Ukrainian side Shakhtar Donetsk. Soon after, they exited the 2025–26 Polish Cup in the quarter-finals after losing to eventual winners Górnik Zabrze. On 16 May 2026, Lech defeated Radomiak Radom 3–1 away to win their second consecutive title with one game to go; it was their first successful title defense since 1993.

== Honours ==
=== Domestic ===
==== League ====
- Ekstraklasa
  - Champions (10): 1982–83, 1983–84, 1989–90, 1991–92, 1992–93, 2009–10, 2014–15, 2021–22, 2024–25, 2025–26
  - Runners-up (3): 2012–13, 2013–14, 2019–20

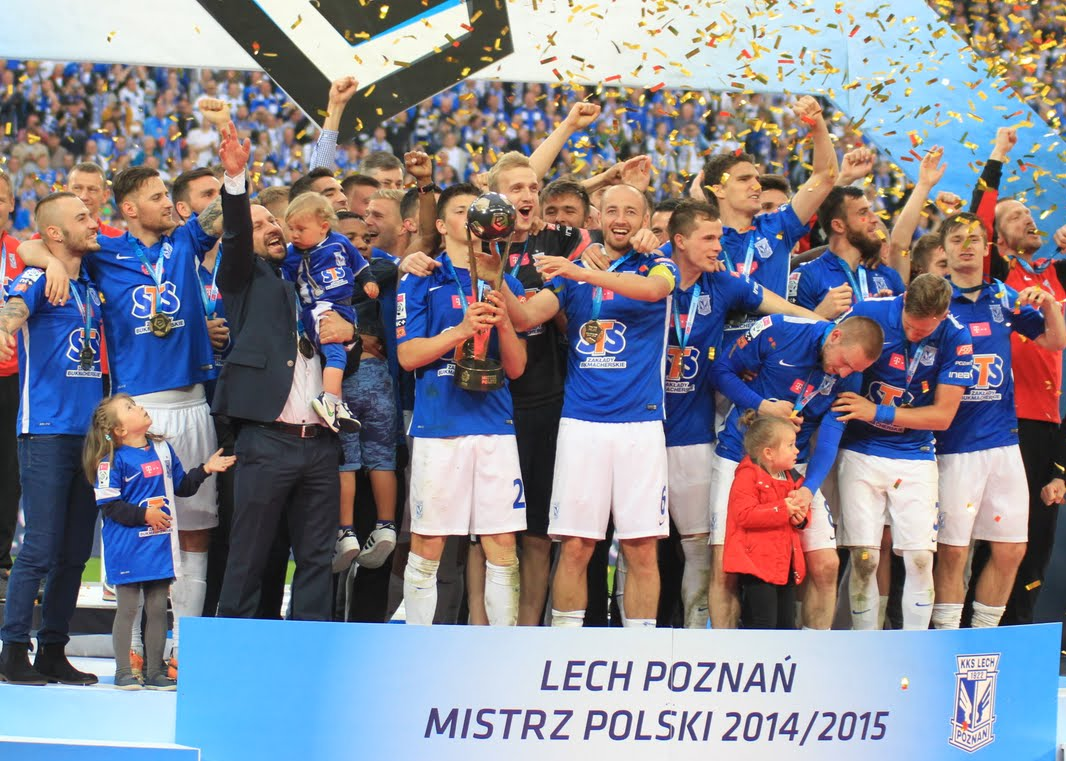
Lech players celebrate winning the 2014–15 league title

- I liga
  - Champions (2): 1960 (Western group), 2001–02
  - Runners-up (1): 1971–72

==== Cup ====
- Polish Cup
  - Winners (5): 1981–82, 1983–84, 1987–88, 2003–04, 2008–09
  - Runners-up (6): 1979–80, 2010–11, 2014–15, 2015–16, 2016–17, 2021–22
- Polish Super Cup
  - Winners (7): 1990, 1992, 2004, 2009, 2015, 2016, 2026
  - Runners-up (5): 1983, 1988, 2010, 2022, 2025

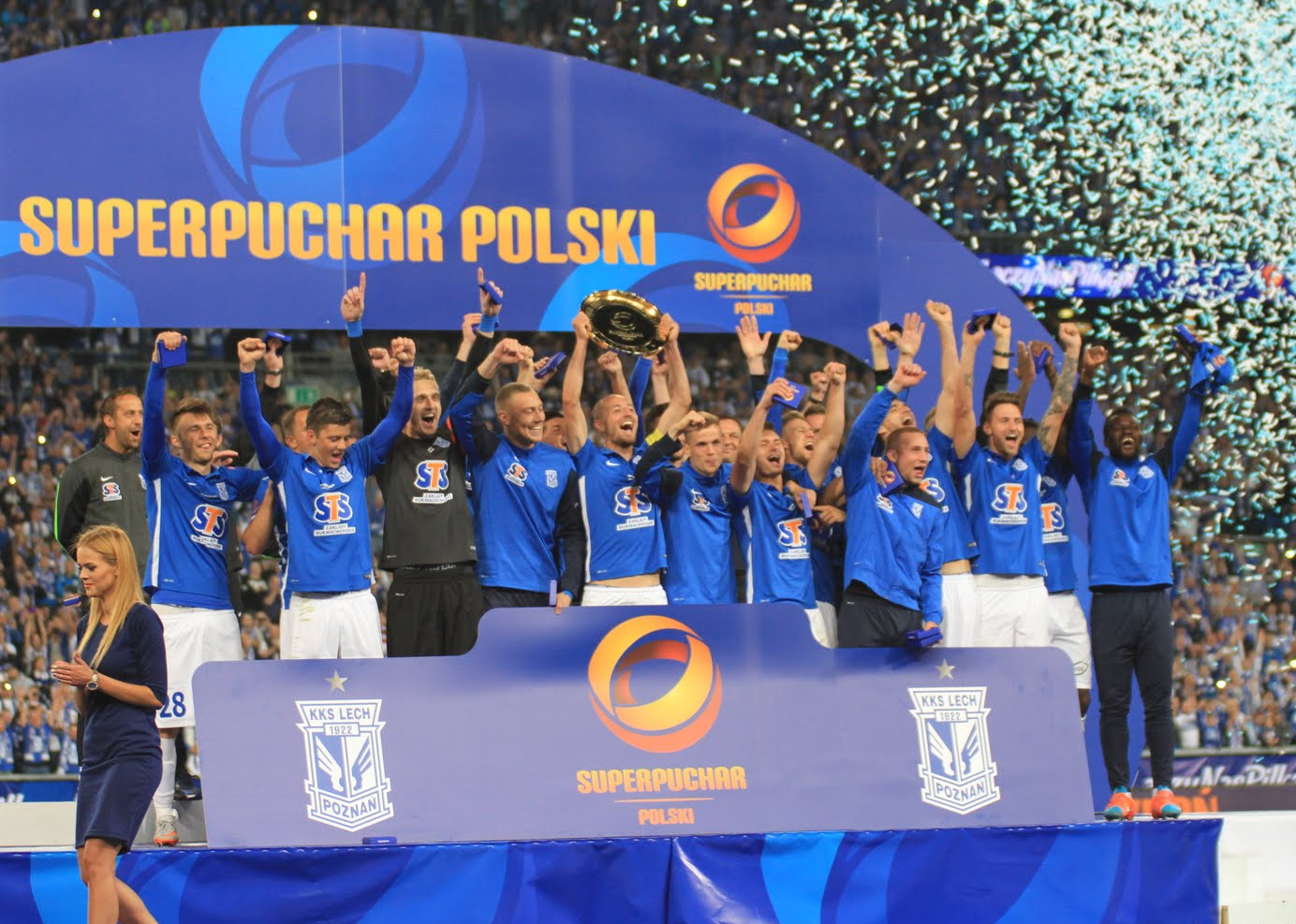
Lech players celebrate winning the 2015 Polish Super Cup

=== Europe ===
- UEFA Europa League
  - Round of 32: 2008–09, 2010–11
- UEFA Europa Conference League
  - Quarter-finals: 2022–23

=== Youth ===
- Polish Under-19 Championship / Central Junior League U19
  - Champions: 1987, 1995, 2018, 2023
  - Runners-up: 1998, 2009, 2010, 2012, 2015
- Polish Under-17 Championship
  - Champions: 2009, 2014, 2015, 2016, 2017
  - Runners-up: 1996, 2012, 2019, 2021

== League history ==
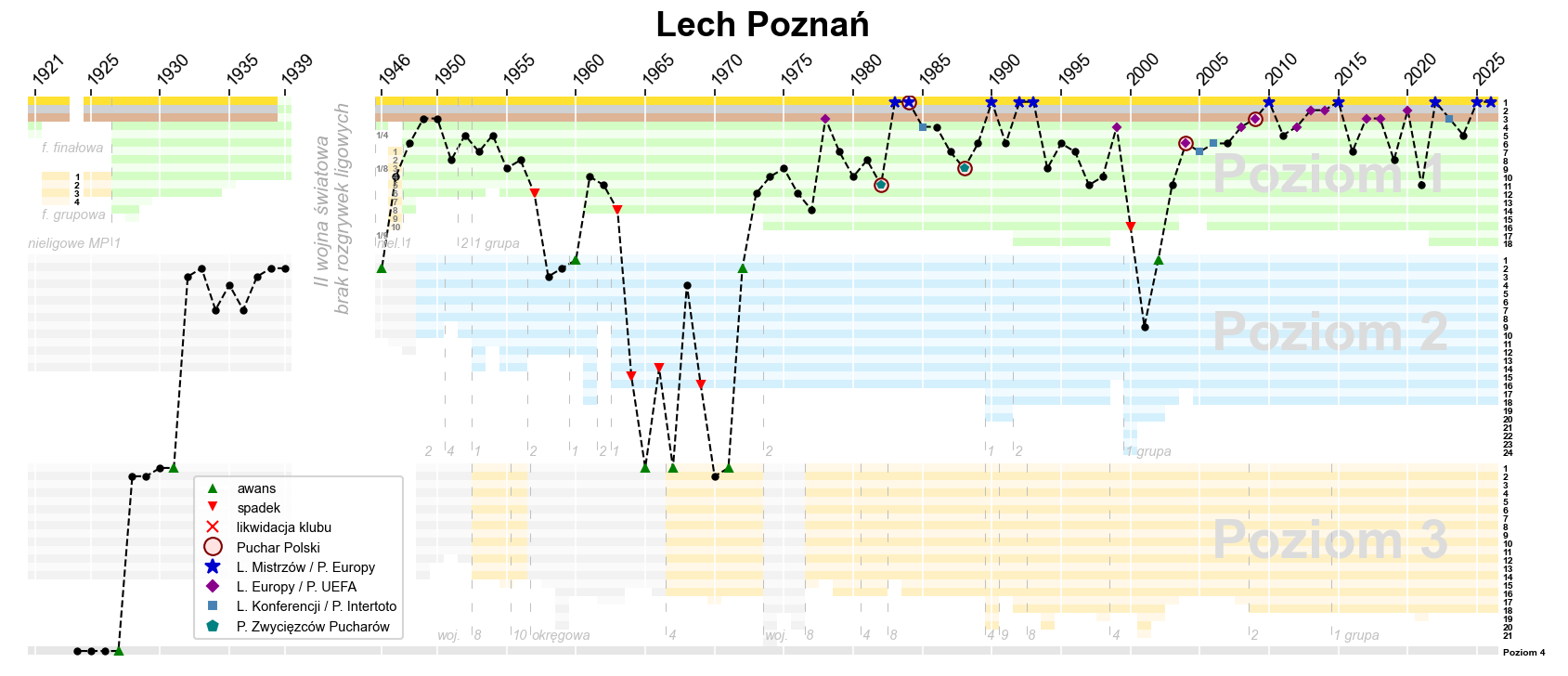
Chart of yearly table positions of Lech in the Polish league system

Tier	Seasons	First	Last	Promotions	Relegations	Most consecutive seasons
Ekstraklasa (tier 1)	65	1948	2025–26	▲27 times to Europe	▼3	28 (1972–2000)
Second tier	19	1932	2001–02	▲4	▼3	9 (1932–1946)
Third tier	8	1928	1970–71	▲4	never	4 (1928–1931)
Fourth tier	4	1924	1927	▲1	never	4 (1924–1927)

== European participation ==
Lech Poznań has played over 160 matches in European competition since 1978. Among the most memorable games in the club's history were the clashes against Barcelona in the 1988–89 season of the UEFA Cup Winners' Cup second round. After both matches ended with 1–1 draw, Lech Poznań lost the penalty shoot-out 4–5. Barcelona eventually went on to win the tournament.

During the 1983–84 European Cup season, Lech earned a 2–0 win at home against Spanish champions Athletic Bilbao. During the 1990–91 season, Lech eliminated the Greek champions Panathinaikos in the first round, with a 5–1 score on aggregate. In the next tie, Lech was knocked out by Marseille but won the first leg 3–2 at home.

During the 2008–09 UEFA Cup season, Lech made it to the group stage of the competition after knocking out higher seeded teams of Grasshopper (notching its then-greatest margin of victory in Europe, with a 6–0 win at home) and Austria Wien (scoring the decisive goal in the last minute of extra-time). In the group stage, Lech finished third-placed ahead of Nancy and Feyenoord to secure a place in the third round, where it was knocked out by the Italian side Udinese.

Starting line-up for the 2010–11 UEFA Europa League group stage home match against Manchester City won by Lech 3–1.

The 2010–11 European campaign saw Lech not only qualify for the group stage of the UEFA Europa League, but also progress from their group ahead of Italian giants Juventus, before losing at the round of 32 to eventual finalists Braga. In later years, they reached the UEFA Europa League group stages twice more, in the 2015–16 and 2020–21 seasons.

In the 2022–23 season, while competing in the UEFA Europa Conference League, Lech reached their first ever European quarter-final where they were eliminated by Italian club Fiorentina. In 2025, after failing to qualify to UEFA Champions League and UEFA Europa League, they entered the 2025–26 UEFA Conference League, eventually progressing to the round of 16 where they were knocked out by Ukrainian side Shakhtar Donetsk.

=== List of results ===
As of match played 5 November 2026

Competition	Apps	Pld	W	D	L	GF	GA
European Cup / UEFA Champions League	10	32	14	2	16	44	53
European Cup Winners' Cup / UEFA Cup Winners' Cup	2	8	4	2	2	10	7
UEFA Cup / UEFA Europa League	16	90	37	19	34	136	114
UEFA Conference League	3	32	18	7	7	61	35
Intertoto Cup / UEFA Intertoto Cup	6	30	13	6	11	52	40
Overall	37	192	86	36	70	303	249

Season	Competition	Round	Opponent	Home	Away	Agg.
1978–79	UEFA Cup	1R	(Germany) MSV Duisburg	2–5	0–5	2–10
1982–83	European Cup Winners' Cup	1R	(Iceland) ÍBV	3–0	1–0	4–0
1982–83	European Cup Winners' Cup	2R	(Scotland) Aberdeen	0–1	0–2	0–3
1983–84	European Cup	1R	(Spain) Athletic Bilbao	2–0	0–4	2–4
1984–85	European Cup	1R	(England) Liverpool	0–1	0–4	0–5
1985	Intertoto Cup	Group 3	(Denmark) Brøndby	5–1	0–2	2nd
1985	Intertoto Cup	Group 3	(Austria) Admira-Wacker Vienna	4–2	3–5	2nd
1985	Intertoto Cup	Group 3	(Sweden) IFK Göteborg	1–4	2–0	2nd
1985–86	UEFA Cup	1R	(Germany) Borussia Mönchengladbach	0–2	1–1	1–3
1986	Intertoto Cup	Group 9	(Denmark) Odense BK	1–1	5–1	1st
1986	Intertoto Cup	Group 9	(Hungary) Siófoki Bányász	4–1	0–0	1st
1986	Intertoto Cup	Group 9	(Austria) LASK	0–0	1–1	1st
1987	Intertoto Cup	Group 6	(Sweden) AIK	0–0	1–4	3rd
1987	Intertoto Cup	Group 6	(Czechoslovakia) Plastika Nitra	3–0	1–2	3rd
1987	Intertoto Cup	Group 6	(Denmark) Lyngby BK	0–1	0–0	3rd
1988–89	European Cup Winners' Cup	1R	(Albania) Flamurtari	1–0	3–2	4–2
1988–89	European Cup Winners' Cup	2R	(Spain) Barcelona	1–1 (a.e.t.)	1–1	2–2 (4–5 p)
1990	Intertoto Cup	Group 3	(Israel) Bnei Yehuda Tel Aviv	3–0	4–2	1st
1990	Intertoto Cup	Group 3	(Israel) Maccabi Haifa	1–0	2–4	1st
1990	Intertoto Cup	Group 3	(Hungary) Siófok	3–1	2–0	1st
1990–91	European Cup	1R	(Greece) Panathinaikos	3–0	2–1	5–1
1990–91	European Cup	2R	(France) Marseille	3–2	1–6	4–8
1992–93	UEFA Champions League	1R	(Latvia) Skonto	2–0	0–0	2–0
1992–93	UEFA Champions League	2R	(Sweden) IFK Göteborg	0–3	0–1	0–4
1993–94	UEFA Champions League	1R	(Israel) Beitar Jerusalem	3–0	4–2	7–2
1993–94	UEFA Champions League	2R	(Russia) Spartak Moscow	1–5	1–2	2–7
1999–00	UEFA Cup	Q	(Latvia) Liepājas Metalurgs	3–1	2–3	5–4
1999–00	UEFA Cup	1R	(Sweden) IFK Göteborg	1–2	0–0	1–2
2004–05	UEFA Cup	2Q	(Russia) Terek Grozny	0–1	0–1	0–2
2005	UEFA Intertoto Cup	1R	(Azerbaijan) Karvan FK	2–0	2–1	4–1
2005	UEFA Intertoto Cup	2R	(France) RC Lens	0–1	1–2	1–3
2006	UEFA Intertoto Cup	2R	(Moldova) Tiraspol	1–3	0–1	1–4
2008–09	UEFA Cup	1Q	(Azerbaijan) Khazar Lankaran	4–1	1–0	5–1
2008–09	UEFA Cup	2Q	(Switzerland) Grasshopper	6–0	0–0	6–0
2008–09	UEFA Cup	1R	Austria Wien	4–2 (a.e.t.)	1–2	5–4
2008–09	UEFA Cup	GS	(France) Nancy	2–2	—N/a	3rd
2008–09	UEFA Cup	GS	(Russia) CSKA Moscow	—N/a	1–2	3rd
2008–09	UEFA Cup	GS	(Spain) Deportivo La Coruña	1–1	—N/a	3rd
2008–09	UEFA Cup	GS	(Netherlands) Feyenoord	—N/a	1–0	3rd
2008–09	UEFA Cup	3R	(Italy) Udinese	2–2	1–2	3–4
2009–10	UEFA Europa League	3Q	(Norway) Fredrikstad	1–2	6–1	7–3
2009–10	UEFA Europa League	PO	(Belgium) Club Brugge	1–0	0–1 (a.e.t.)	1–1 (3–4 p)
2010–11	UEFA Champions League	2Q	(Azerbaijan) Inter Baku	0–1 (a.e.t.)	1–0	1–1 (9–8 p)
2010–11	UEFA Champions League	3Q	(Czech Republic) Sparta Praha	0–1	0–1	0–2
2010–11	UEFA Europa League	PO	(Ukraine) FC Dnipro	0–0	1–0	1–0
2010–11	UEFA Europa League	GS	(Italy) Juventus	1–1	3–3	2nd
2010–11	UEFA Europa League	GS	(Austria) Red Bull Salzburg	2–0	1–0	2nd
2010–11	UEFA Europa League	GS	(England) Manchester City	3–1	1–3	2nd
2010–11	UEFA Europa League	1/16	(Portugal) Braga	1–0	0–2	1–2
2012–13	UEFA Europa League	1Q	(Kazakhstan) Zhetysu	2–0	1–1	3–1
2012–13	UEFA Europa League	2Q	(Azerbaijan) Khazar Lankaran	1–0	1–1	2–1
2012–13	UEFA Europa League	3Q	(Sweden) AIK	1–0	0–3	1–3
2013–14	UEFA Europa League	2Q	(Finland) FC Honka	2–1	3–1	5–2
2013–14	UEFA Europa League	3Q	(Lithuania) Žalgiris Vilnius	2–1	0–1	2–2 (a)
2014–15	UEFA Europa League	2Q	(Estonia) Nõmme Kalju	3–0	0–1	3–1
2014–15	UEFA Europa League	3Q	(Iceland) Stjarnan	0–0	0–1	0–1
2015–16	UEFA Champions League	2Q	(Bosnia and Herzegovina) Sarajevo	1–0	2–0	3–0
2015–16	UEFA Champions League	3Q	(Switzerland) Basel	1–3	0–1	1–4
2015–16	UEFA Europa League	PO	(Hungary) Videoton	3–0	1–0	4–0
2015–16	UEFA Europa League	GS	(Portugal) Belenenses	0–0	0–0	3rd
2015–16	UEFA Europa League	GS	(Switzerland) Basel	0–1	0–2	3rd
2015–16	UEFA Europa League	GS	(Italy) Fiorentina	0–2	2–1	3rd
2017–18	UEFA Europa League	1Q	(North Macedonia) Pelister	4–0	3–0	7–0
2017–18	UEFA Europa League	2Q	(Norway) Haugesund	2–0	2–3	4–3
2017–18	UEFA Europa League	3Q	(Netherlands) Utrecht	2–2	0–0	2–2 (a)
2018–19	UEFA Europa League	1Q	(Armenia) Gandzasar Kapan	2–0	1–2	3–2
2018–19	UEFA Europa League	2Q	(Belarus) Shakhtyor Soligorsk	3–1 (a.e.t.)	1–1	4–2
2018–19	UEFA Europa League	3Q	(Belgium) Genk	1–2	0–2	1–4
2020–21	UEFA Europa League	1Q	(Latvia) Valmiera	3–0	—N/a	—N/a
2020–21	UEFA Europa League	2Q	(Sweden) Hammarby IF	—N/a	3–0	—N/a
2020–21	UEFA Europa League	3Q	(Cyprus) Apollon Limassol	—N/a	5–0	—N/a
2020–21	UEFA Europa League	PO	(Belgium) Charleroi	—N/a	2–1	—N/a
2020–21	UEFA Europa League	GS	(Portugal) Benfica	2–4	0–4	4th
2020–21	UEFA Europa League	GS	(Scotland) Rangers	0–2	0–1	4th
2020–21	UEFA Europa League	GS	(Belgium) Standard Liège	3–1	1–2	4th
2022–23	UEFA Champions League	1Q	(Azerbaijan) Qarabağ	1–0	1–5	2–5
2022–23	UEFA Europa Conference League	2Q	(Georgia (country)) Dinamo Batumi	5–0	1–1	6–1
2022–23	UEFA Europa Conference League	3Q	(Iceland) Víkingur Reykjavík	4–1 (a.e.t.)	0–1	4–2
2022–23	UEFA Europa Conference League	PO	(Luxembourg) F91 Dudelange	2–0	1–1	3–1
2022–23	UEFA Europa Conference League	GS	(Spain) Villarreal	3–0	3–4	2nd
2022–23	UEFA Europa Conference League	GS	Austria Wien	4–1	1–1	2nd
2022–23	UEFA Europa Conference League	GS	(Israel) Hapoel Beer-Sheva	0–0	1–1	2nd
2022–23	UEFA Europa Conference League	KPO	(Norway) Bodø/Glimt	1–0	0–0	1–0
2022–23	UEFA Europa Conference League	1/8	(Sweden) Djurgårdens IF	2–0	3–0	5–0
2022–23	UEFA Europa Conference League	QF	(Italy) Fiorentina	1–4	3–2	4–6
2023–24	UEFA Europa Conference League	2Q	(Lithuania) Kauno Žalgiris	3–1	2–1	5–2
2023–24	UEFA Europa Conference League	3Q	(Slovakia) Spartak Trnava	2–1	1–3	3–4
2025–26	UEFA Champions League	2Q	(Iceland) Breiðablik	7–1	1–0	8–1
2025–26	UEFA Champions League	3Q	(Serbia) Red Star Belgrade	1–3	1–1	2–4
2025–26	UEFA Europa League	PO	(Belgium) Genk	1–5	2–1	3–6
2025–26	UEFA Conference League	LP	(Austria) Rapid Wien	4–1	—N/a	11th
2025–26	UEFA Conference League	LP	(Gibraltar) Lincoln Red Imps	—N/a	1–2	11th
2025–26	UEFA Conference League	LP	(Spain) Rayo Vallecano	—N/a	2–3	11th
2025–26	UEFA Conference League	LP	(Switzerland) Lausanne-Sport	2–0	—N/a	11th
2025–26	UEFA Conference League	LP	(Germany) Mainz 05	1–1	—N/a	11th
2025–26	UEFA Conference League	LP	(Czech Republic) Sigma Olomouc	—N/a	2–1	11th
2025–26	UEFA Conference League	KPO	(Finland) KuPS	1–0	2–0	3–0
2025–26	UEFA Conference League	1/8	(Ukraine) Shakhtar Donetsk	1–3	2–1	3–4
2026–27	UEFA Champions League	2Q	(Denmark) AGF	1–4 (a.e.t.)	4–1	5–5 (3–4 p)
2026–27	UEFA Europa League	3Q	(Faroe Islands) KÍ Klaksvík	1–0	5–0	6–0
2026–27	UEFA Europa League	PO	(Switzerland) Thun	7–0	2–2	9–2
2026–27	UEFA Europa League	LP	(England) Crystal Palace	—N/a	0–4	
2026–27	UEFA Europa League	LP	(Germany) Bayer Leverkusen	0–4	—N/a	
2026–27	UEFA Europa League	LP	(England) Sunderland	1–1	—N/a	
2026–27	UEFA Europa League	LP	(Portugal) Benfica	—N/a	1–3	
2026–27	UEFA Europa League	LP	(Belgium) Union Saint-Gilloise	—N/a		
2026–27	UEFA Europa League	LP	(Hungary) Ferencváros		—N/a	
2026–27	UEFA Europa League	LP	(Portugal) Torreense		—N/a	
2026–27	UEFA Europa League	LP	(Greece) OFI	—N/a		

==== UEFA Team ranking ====
As of 27 August 2026

Rank	Team	Points
73	(Belgium) Genk	28.000
74	(Bulgaria) Ludogorets Razgrad	27.250
75	(Poland) Lech Poznań	27.250
76	(Spain) Sevilla	27.000
77	(Israel) Maccabi Tel Aviv	26.000

==== Best results in European competitions ====
Season	Achievement	Notes
European Cup/UEFA Champions League
1990–91	Round of 16	lost to (France) Marseille 3–2 in Poznań, 1–6 in Marseille
UEFA Cup Winners' Cup
1982–83	Round of 16	lost to (Scotland) Aberdeen 0–2 in Aberdeen, 0–1 in Poznań
1988–89	Round of 16	lost to (Spain) Barcelona 1–1 in Barcelona, 1–1 (a.e.t., 4–5 pen) in Poznań
UEFA Conference League
2022–23	Quarter-final	lost to (Italy) Fiorentina 1–4 in Poznań, 3–2 in Florence

== Records ==
- Highest victory, Ekstraklasa: 11–1 vs. Szombierki Bytom, 27 August 1950
- Highest UEFA competition victory, UEFA Europa League: 7–0 vs. (Switzerland) Thun, 20 August 2026
- Highest loss, Ekstraklasa: 0–8 vs. Wisła Kraków, 30 May 1976
- Highest attendance overall: c. 60,000 vs. Zawisza Bydgoszcz, 25 June 1972
- Highest attendance at the Stadion Poznań: c. 45,000 vs. Widzew Łódź, 8 April 1984
- Highest average attendance, Ekstraklasa: 45,384 per game, in the 1972–73 season (13 games)
- Most appearances, Ekstraklasa: (Poland) Hieronim Barczak, 367 (1973–86)
- Most goals, Ekstraklasa: (Poland) Teodor Anioła, 140 (1945–61)
- Most goals in a season, Ekstraklasa: (Poland) Jerzy Podbrożny, 25 (1992–93)
- Most national caps: Luis Henríquez, 50 for Panama

== Players ==
=== Current squad ===
As of 18 September 2026

Note: Flags indicate national team as defined under FIFA eligibility rules; some limited exceptions apply. Players may hold more than one non-FIFA nationality.

No.	Pos.	Nation	Player
1	GK	POL	Mateusz Lis
2	DF	POR	Joel Pereira
3	DF	SWE	Alex Douglas
4	DF	POR	João Moutinho
5	MF	SWE	Gustav Berggren
7	FW	CIV	Yannick Agnero
8	FW	IRI	Ali Gholizadeh
9	FW	SWE	Mikael Ishak (captain)
10	FW	SWE	Patrik Wålemark
11	FW	FIN	Daniel Håkans
14	MF	SWE	Leo Bengtsson
15	DF	POL	Michał Gurgul
17	FW	IRI	Allahyar Sayyadmanesh
20	DF	POL	Robert Gumny
21	MF	ESP	Pablo Rodríguez
22	MF	POL	Radosław Murawski (vice-captain)

No.	Pos.	Nation	Player
24	MF	POL	Filip Jagiełło
27	DF	POL	Wojciech Mońka
31	GK	POL	Wiktor Obremski
33	GK	POL	Mateusz Pruchniewski
43	MF	POL	Antoni Kozubal
44	MF	POL	Eryk Śledziński
53	MF	POL	Karol Delikat
54	FW	POL	Kamil Jakóbczyk
55	DF	POL	Piotr Bartczak
56	FW	POL	Wojciech Szymczak
59	DF	GHA	Terry Yegbe
72	DF	POL	Mateusz Skrzypczak
77	FW	HON	Luis Palma
90	DF	POL	Hubert Janyszka
99	GK	POL	Aleks Olsztyn

=== Out on loan ===
Note: Flags indicate national team as defined under FIFA eligibility rules; some limited exceptions apply. Players may hold more than one non-FIFA nationality.

No.	Pos.	Nation	Player
23	MF	ISL	Gísli Þórðarson (at FC St. Pauli until 30 June 2027)
44	MF	POL	Tymoteusz Gmur (at Stal Mielec until 30 June 2027)
—	MF	POL	Bartłomiej Barański (at Odra Opole until 30 June 2027)

No.	Pos.	Nation	Player
—	MF	POL	Sammy Dudek (at Unia Skierniewice until 30 June 2027)
—	DF	USA	Ian Hoffmann (at Mjällby until 31 December 2026)

=== Retired numbers ===
Note: Flags indicate national team as defined under FIFA eligibility rules; some limited exceptions apply. Players may hold more than one non-FIFA nationality.

No.	Pos.	Nation	Player
12	–	POL	"The 12th man", reserved for club supporters

=== Notable former players ===
- (Poland) Teodor Anioła – striker, the best all-time league goalscorer in the club's history, represented Lech from 1948 until 1957.
- (Poland) Jarosław Araszkiewicz – attacking midfielder, won five championship titles with Lech Poznań. Finished his career in the age of 38.
- (Poland) Jacek Bąk – defender, played in the 2002 FIFA World Cup and 2006 FIFA World Cup, former player of French clubs Lyon and Lens.
- Jarosław Bako – the goalkeeper of Poland national team in the early 1990s.
- (Poland) Hieronim Barczak – defender, 369 league appearances for Lech.
- Jan Bednarek – defender, represented Poland at the 2018 FIFA World Cup, UEFA Euro 2020, 2022 FIFA World Cup and UEFA Euro 2024, currently playing for Porto.
- (Poland) Edmund Białas – striker, along with Anioła and Henryk Czapczyk, created an attacking trio called A-B-C, which was very successful in the 1950s.
- Bartosz Bosacki – defender, while playing for Lech he represented Poland at the 2006 FIFA World Cup, scoring twice against Costa Rica.
- Jerzy Brzęczek – midfielder, silver medalist with Poland at the 1992 Summer Olympics, former Poland national team captain and manager.
- (United States) Jimmy Conrad – defender, USA national team member at the 2006 FIFA World Cup.
- (Poland) Henryk Czapczyk – vice-captain and later coach of Lech during the club's rise in the 50s and 60s.
- (Poland) Jacek Dembiński – striker, played in the German Bundesliga with Hamburger SV.
- (Serbia) Ivan Đurđević – defender, played over 100 games for Lech, managed the reserve team and Lech's senior team in 2018.
- Roman Jakóbczak – midfielder, Poland national team member at the 1974 FIFA World Cup.
- Andrzej Juskowiak – striker, silver medalist with Poland at the 1992 Summer Olympics, former player of Sporting Lisbon, Olympiacos, Borussia Mönchengladbach and VfL Wolfsburg.
- Mirosław Justek – defender, Poland national team member at the 1978 FIFA World Cup.
- Jakub Kamiński – winger, represented Poland at the 2022 FIFA World Cup, currently plays for Portuguse side Benfica.
- (Poland) Jerzy Karasiński – goalkeeper, considered one of Lech Poznań's all-time best players, prominent during a lean period in the club's history.
- (Poland) Waldemar Kryger – defender, former player of German club VfL Wolfsburg.
- Janusz Kupcewicz – midfielder, bronze medalist with Poland at the 1982 FIFA World Cup.
- Robert Lewandowski – striker, the current Poland national team captain and all-time top scorer, currently playing for Chicago Fire.
- Karol Linetty – midfielder, Poland national team member at the 2018 FIFA World Cup, UEFA Euro 2020 and 2022 FIFA World Cup.
- Adam Majewski – midfielder, Poland national team member in 2001
- Henryk Miłoszewicz – midfielder, Poland national team member in 1980
- Jakub Moder – midfielder, Poland national team member, represented Poland at the UEFA Euro 2020 and UEFA Euro 2024, currently plays for Dutch side Feyenoord.
- Piotr Mowlik – goalkeeper, Poland national team member (1974–1981), Mariusz's father.
- (Poland) Mirosław Okoński – striker, one of the club's icons, especially loved by the fans, after winning two consecutive championships with Lech in 1983 and 1984, transferred to Hamburger SV, played also for Greek side AEK.
- (Poland) Bogusław Pachelski – prolific striker who scored 41 goals in 149 appearances over five years.
- (Poland) Krzysztof Pawlak – defender, played two games at the 1986 FIFA World Cup while representing Lech.
- (Poland) Jerzy Podbrożny – played also in MLS with the Chicago Fire.
- (Poland) Arkadiusz Radomski – began his career with Lech, then spent most of his career in the Netherlands. Made his appearance at the 2006 FIFA World Cup.
- (Poland) Piotr Reiss – striker, scored 109 Ekstraklasa goals for Lech, the oldest goalscorer in the league's history (40 years and 305 days). He also played for Hertha BSC and MSV Duisburg.
- Hernan Rengifo – striker, played also for Peru.
- (Latvia) Artjoms Rudnevs – striker, played for German clubs Hamburger SV and 1. FC Köln.
- Bartosz Salamon – defender, represented Poland at the UEFA Euro 2016 and UEFA Euro 2024.
- Michał Skóraś – winger, made an appearance for Poland at the 2022 FIFA World Cup while at Lech, now playing for French side Lens.
- Piotr Świerczewski – midfielder, silver medalist with Poland at the 1992 Summer Olympics, represented Poland at the 2002 FIFA World Cup, former Bastia, Saint-Étienne and Marseille player.
- Łukasz Teodorczyk – striker, represented Poland at the 2018 FIFA World Cup, former Belgian First Division A top scorer.
- (Poland) Mirosław Trzeciak – striker, played in Spanish clubs Osasuna and Poli Ejido.
- (Poland) Maciej Żurawski – striker, played at the 2002 FIFA World Cup and 2006 FIFA World Cup, after playing for Lech, he transferred to Wisła Kraków, then to Celtic, and on to Omonia.

==== Ekstraklasa top goalscorers ====
- (Poland) Teodor Anioła (1949 – 20 goals, 1950 – 21 goals, 1951 – 20 goals)
- (Poland) Mirosław Okoński (1982–83 – 15 goals)
- (Poland) Andrzej Juskowiak (1989–90 – 18 goals)
- (Poland) Jerzy Podbrożny (1991–92 – 20 goals, 1992–93 – 25 goals)
- (Poland) Piotr Reiss (2006–07 – 15 goals)
- (Poland) Robert Lewandowski (2009–10 – 18 goals)
- (Latvia) Artjoms Rudņevs (2011–12 – 22 goals)
- (Poland) Marcin Robak (2016–17 – 18 goals)
- (Denmark) Christian Gytkjær (2019–20 – 24 goals)

== Coaching staff ==
As of 21 September 2026

Position	Staff
Manager	(Denmark) Niels Frederiksen
Assistant manager	(Norway) Andreas Hagen
Assistant coaches	(England) Andy Parslow (Poland) Hubert Wędzonka
Goalkeeping coach	(Poland) Dominik Kubiak
Fitness coaches	(Poland) Łukasz Bortnik (Poland) Karol Kikut (Poland) Józef Napierała (Poland) Michał Włodarczyk
Match analyst	(Poland) Hubert Barański
Head of medical department	(Poland) Rafał Hejna
Team doctors	(Poland) Patrick Bulinśki (Poland) Tomasz Jaśkowiak (Poland) Aleksander Zych
Physiotherapists	(Poland) Bartosz Górecki (Poland) Marcin Lis (Poland) Maciej Łopatka (Poland) Maciej Smuniewski
Dietician	(Poland) Patryk Wiśniewski
Team manager	(Poland) Mariusz Skrzypczak
Kit manager	(Poland) Sławomir Mizgalski
Cook	(Poland) Artur Dzierzbicki

Source: Lech Poznań

== Stadiums ==
=== Dębiec Stadium ===
Initially the club's first stadium was located in the Dębiec district between two train tracks. It belonged to PKP (the Polish state railways) and was demolished in 2013 after a long period of inactivity.

=== Edmund Szyc Stadium ===
Edmund Szyc Stadium is a currently ruined multi-purpose stadium in the Wilda district, named after Edmund Szyc, one of founders of Warta Poznań. It is the historical home of the other football team Warta Poznań, but Lech played there sporadically between the 1950s and 1970s.

=== Stadion Poznań ===
The Stadion Poznań is the home ground of Lech Poznań, and was one of the venues for the group phase of Euro 2012. It has a league capacity of 42,837 (all seated). The stadium was originally built between 1968 and 1980. From its inauguration in August 1980 Lech Poznań has used the ground as its main venue; since 2010 it has also been used by Warta Poznań, which currently plays in Fortuna 1. Liga. The ground is situated on the street ul. Bułgarska 17 in the southwestern part of the city (Grunwald district).

In the years 2003–10 the stadium underwent a complete reconstruction, including the building of four new fully covered stands. Currently it is the fifth largest stadium in Poland (after Kazimierz Górski National Stadium, Silesia Stadium, The Municipal Stadium in Wroclaw and PGE Arena Gdańsk) and third largest in Ekstraklasa (after the latter two). The grand opening after final renovation took place on 20 September 2010, with Sting's Symphonicity Tour concert.

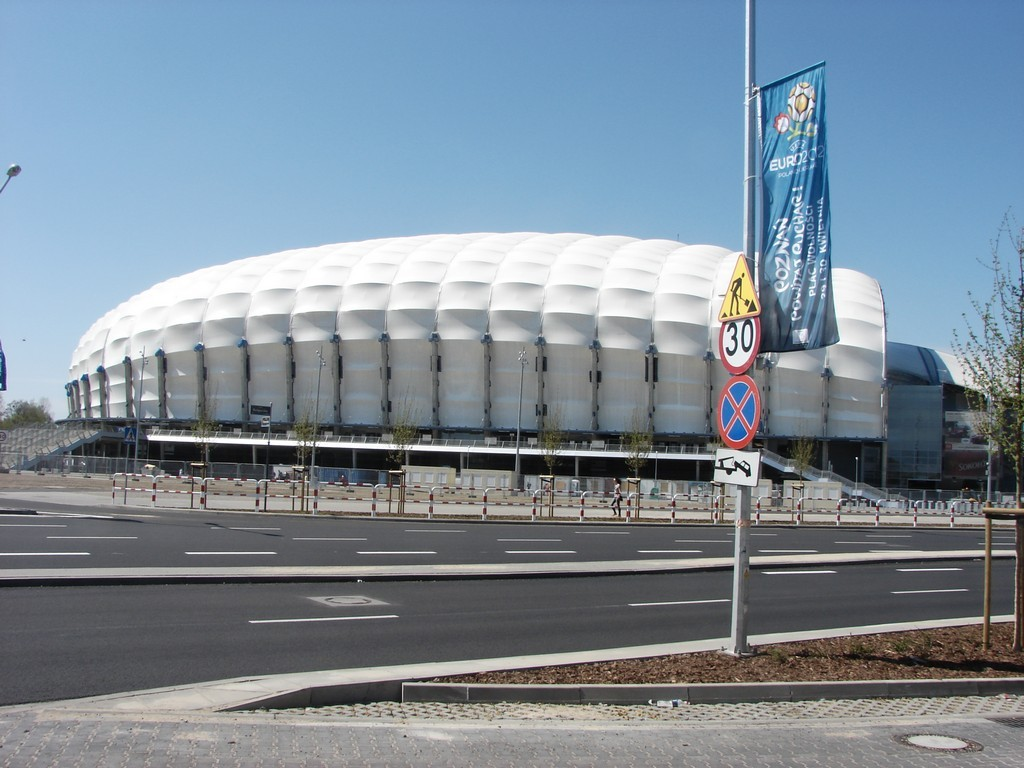
Exterior of the municipal stadium in Poznań

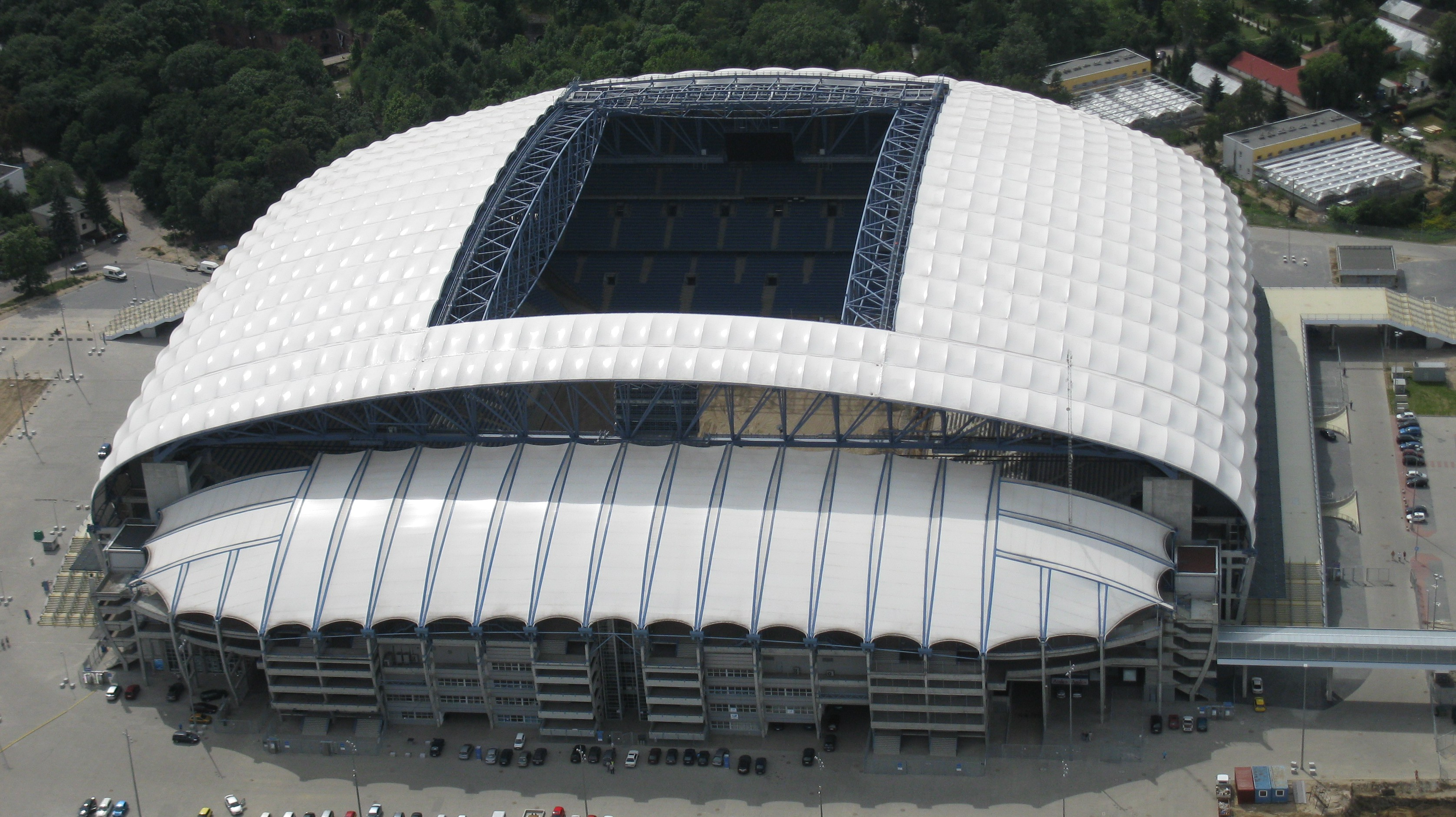
Full Exterior of the stadium

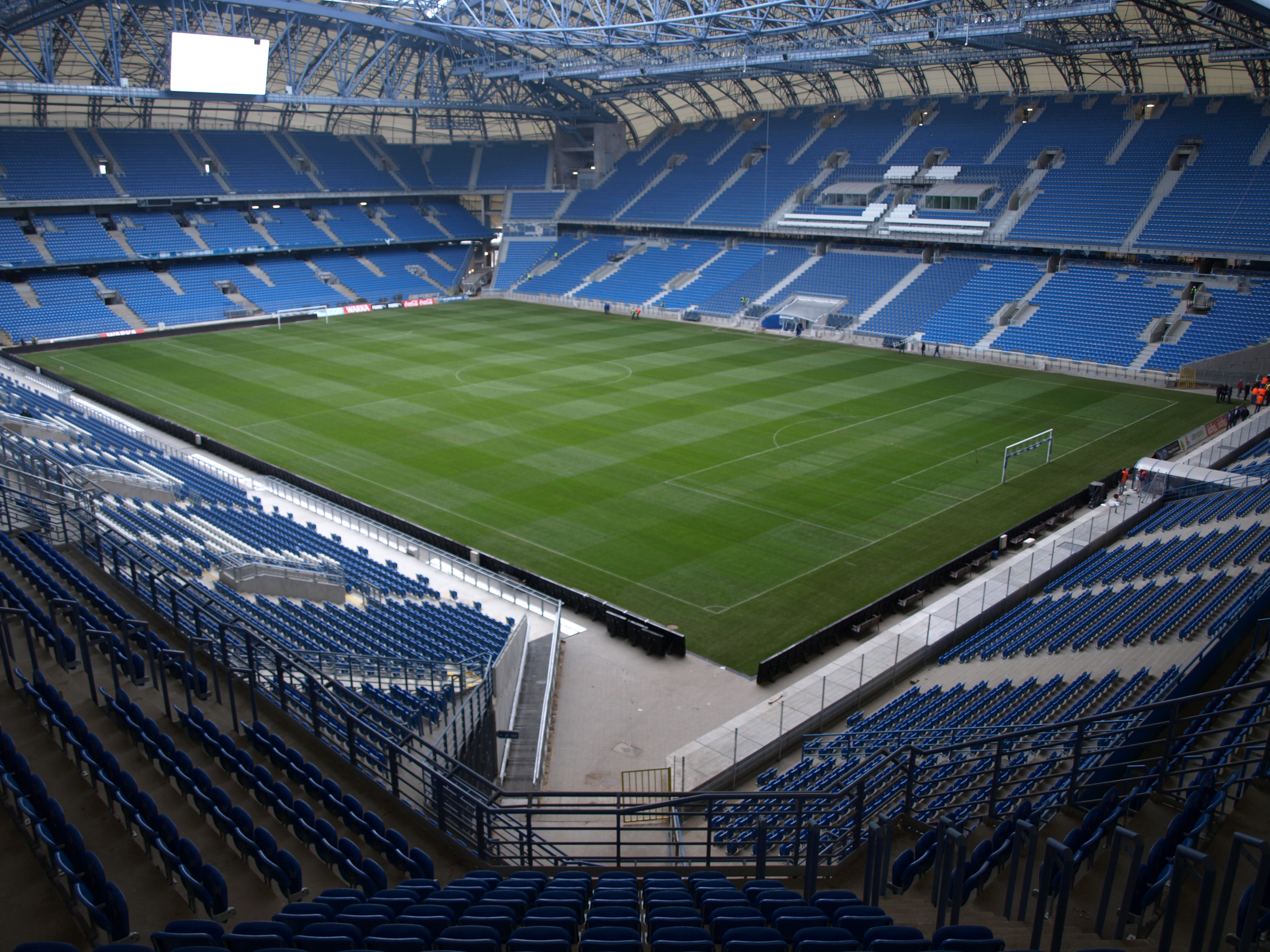
Full interior showing vip stand

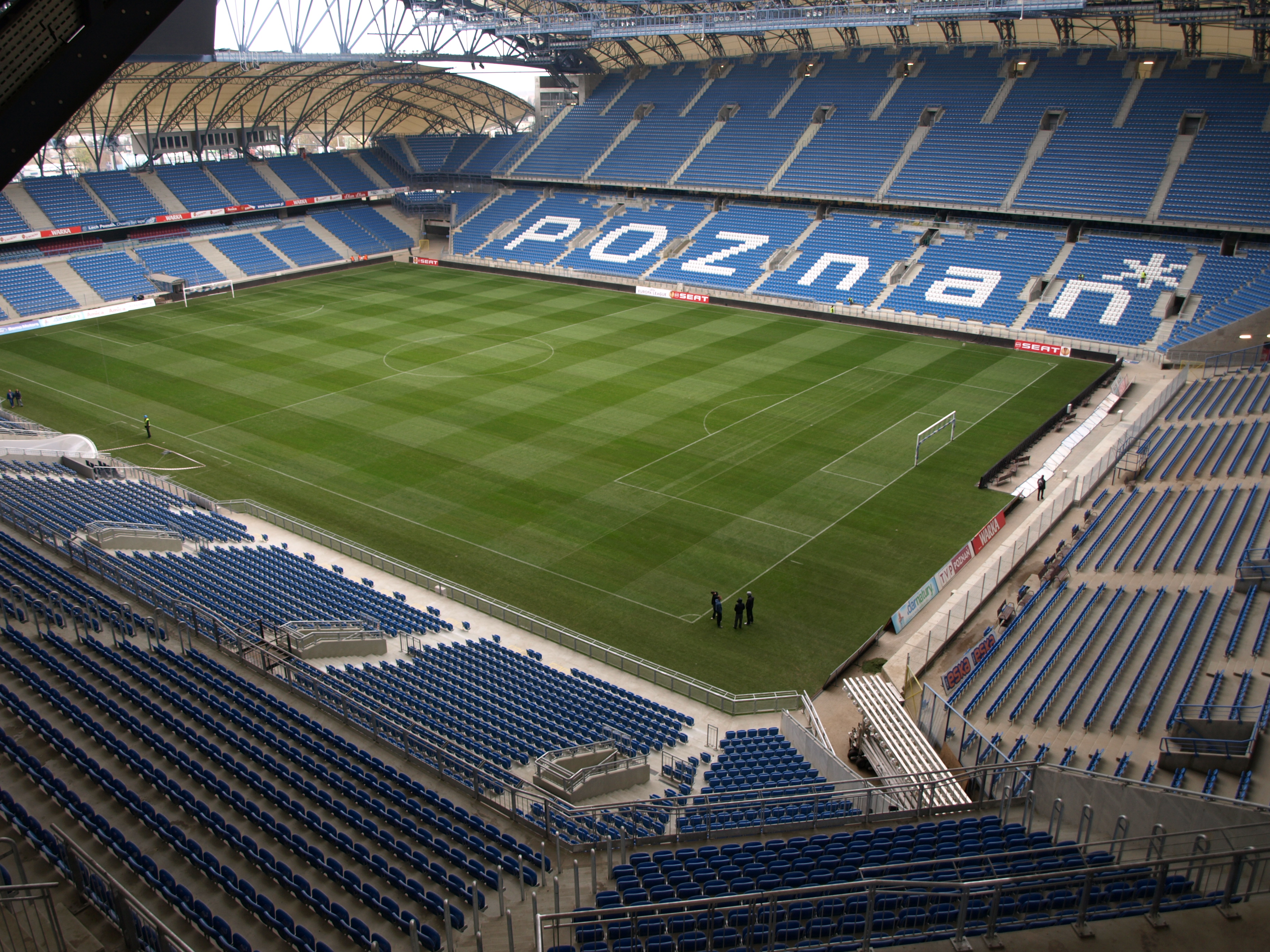
Interior of the municipal stadium

== Supporters ==
Academic studies identify Lech Poznań’s organised fan scene as closely associated with right-wing nationalism in Poland. Research distinguishes Poznań’s ultras from apolitical hooligans, noting that political meaning is deliberately expressed, especially in European fixtures or matches with symbolic opponents. News media also describes Lech's ultras as politically either right-wing or far-right. Lech Poznań has been repeatedly sanctioned by UEFA for racist chanting and racist stadium displays of its supporters, including monetary fines and stadium bans.

In August 2013, during a Europa League qualifier at home to Žalgiris, a group of Lech Poznań ultras hung a banner reading "Litewski chamie, klęknij przed polskim panem" ("Lithuanian scum, kneel before the Polish master"). Four individuals were later convicted in 2016 by a Poznań district court for publicly insulting people of Lithuanian nationality; they received community service penalties. The court overturned a broad ban on attending mass events that had also been imposed. The incident drew official condemnation from the Polish Ministry of Foreign Affairs and the Lithuanian diplomatic service, and the club's authorities publicly condemned the banner. In September 2013, UEFA sanctioned Lech Poznań for the incident and the club was ordered to close Kocioł, the most vocal supporters' stand, for its next European home match, as well as receiving a €5,000 fine.

In January 2014, several Jewish organisations criticised a decision by a Poznań prosecutor not to pursue charges against Lech's supporters accused of antisemitic chanting during a match against Widzew Łódź, a club from a city with a large pre-war Jewish population. Ultras shouted slogans including "You belong in Auschwitz", "Ride on, Jews", "Into the ovens", and "Go to the gas, RTS", with RTS referring to the Łódź club. The prosecutor’s office stated that no charges would be brought because the chants were directed at rival fans rather than Jews as a group and therefore were not deemed an incitement to racial hatred. Prosecutor's spokeswoman Magdalena Mazur-Prus described the chants as "reprehensible and unacceptable" but argued that they did not meet the legal threshold for a criminal offence.

In July 2015, ahead of a UEFA Champions League qualifying match between Lech Poznań and Sarajevo, Lech hooligans clashed with Sarajevo supporters in the streets of Sarajevo, with police reporting 27 injuries involving fans from both clubs and officers, significant property damage, and at least one detention. During the same qualifying tie, Lech Poznań supporters displayed a banner reading "The Piła Legion – the blood of our race", which UEFA classified as racist. In response, UEFA's Control, Ethics and Disciplinary Body ordered Lech Poznań to play one home match behind closed doors and imposed a €50,000 fine. The Polish Football Association (PZPN) formally protested the sanction, stating that it accepted UEFA’s zero tolerance policy on racism and Nazism but argued that the banner did not constitute racist content and had previously appeared at European matches.

Lech Poznań supporters threatened and carried out a boycott of a 17 September 2015 Europa League match against Belenenses over UEFA's decision to donate €1 from each ticket to refugee assistance. Approximately 8,0000 spectators attended this match, well below the club's average of 20,000, and a "Stop Islamization" banner was displayed at the stadium entrance; ultras had earlier displayed anti-refugee flags.

On 1 October 2017, ultras displayed a banner reading "The Lech Poznań stadium and fans...the last bastion of freedom in the city frazzled by leftist paranoia" during the match against Legia Warsaw. The phrase "leftist paranoia" referred to the mayor of Poznań, Jacek Jaśkowiak, participating in a local march for Equality and publicly supporting LGBTQ rights.

On 20 May 2018, during a decisive Ekstraklasa match against Legia Warsaw, Lech's ultras threw flares onto the pitch, resulting in the referee stopping play in the 77th minute. Dark smoke and supporters pushing against barriers led riot police to intervene. Lech were ordered to play eight subsequent matches without spectators by the regional governor, covering the first five league matches of the next season and their first three UEFA Europa League fixtures. Legia were awarded a 3–0 victory.

In August 2025, the Football Federation of Kosovo condemned the display of a "Kosovo is Serbia" banner by Lech Poznań supporters during a Champions League third qualifying round match against Red Star Belgrade. The federation described the banner as a political provocation and a breach of UEFA rules prohibiting political and discriminatory messages at football matches. Red Star Belgrade subsequently thanked Lech Poznań and its supporters publicly, which the FFK said further legitimised the message. The FFK submitted a formal complaint to UEFA seeking disciplinary action against both clubs. UEFA ruled in favour of the FFK, imposing a €10,000 fine on Lech Poznań for the conduct of its supporters.

In November 2025, Lech's ultras and Rayo Vallecano's ultra group Bukaneros clashed in the Vallecas district of Madrid ahead of their Conference League match, with several hundred participants involved in street fighting that required police intervention, including warning shots, and resulted in at least one injury and one arrest. News media reported that the confrontation followed an earlier provocation involving Lech Poznań graffiti and stickers at the Rayo Vallecano stadium, and described the clash as rooted in opposing political ideologies, with Bukaneros identified as left wing and Lech Poznań's ultras as right wing.

=== Friendships and rivalries ===
For over three decades, Lech supporters have had a fellowship with fans from Arka Gdynia and Cracovia, sometimes called the Wielka Triada or The Great Triad. Close friendship also links Lech fans with KSZO Ostrowiec Świętokrzyski and ŁKS Łódź supporters. Among the more ardent element of supporters, there are some private contacts with Fratria, fans of Spartak Moscow, and Crveni Đavoli, fans of Radnički Kragujevac from Serbia.

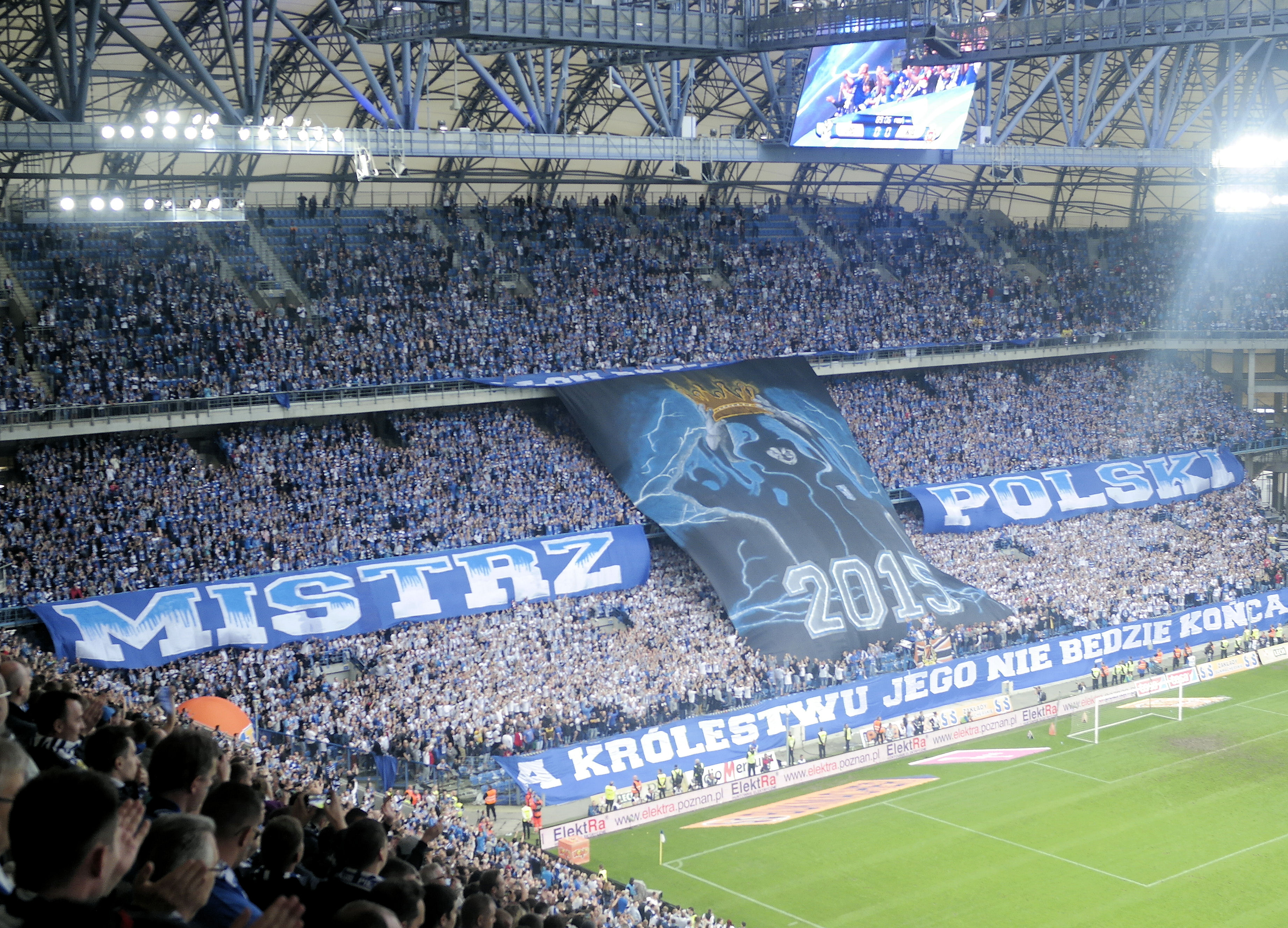
Lech supporters during 2014–15 Ekstraklasa season

The biggest rival is Legia Warsaw with whom they contest the "Derby of Poland". Wisła Kraków, Lechia Gdańsk and Śląsk Wrocław are also big rivals due to the fans friendship with Arka and Cracovia, similarly Korona Kielce are disliked due to the friendship with KSZO and Widzew Łódź due to ŁKS. Other teams that can be considered rivals are Ruch Chorzów and Pogoń Szczecin. In past the "Greater Poland derby" was played against regional rivals Dyskobolia Grodzisk Wielkopolski before their decline.

Relations with local rival Warta Poznań are neutral as the clubs have almost always played in different leagues and many fans attend matches of both teams.

=== The Poznań ===
The fans' goal celebration involving the turning of their backs to the pitch, joining arms and jumping up and down in unison—originated in 1961. It is known in the English speaking world as "The Poznan" after Manchester City began using the celebration following their clash with Lech Poznań in the group stages of the 2010–11 UEFA Europa League. Also popular with fans of Scottish club Celtic who call their version "The Huddle", in homage to the team's pre-match ritual of a huddle before every game kicks off. In 2019, the expression "the Poznan" was included in the Cambridge English Dictionary.

=== Rap music ===
Many Polish rappers who hail from Poznań have been strongly linked to the Lech supporter scene and the club prominently features in their music. Peja was an ardent supporter since he was 15 years old, and was active in the hooligan scene in the 90s. Evtis, Ascetoholix, Bzyk and DJ Decks are all prominent supporters. The fans have produced, recorded and released two rap CD's called Definicja Kibol and Definicja Kibol 2 as compilation of various artists.

== Other departments ==
=== Lech Poznań II ===
The club operates a reserve team.

They gained promotion in the 2003–04 season to the third tier after winning the league and beating Jarota Jarocin 2–0 twice, 4–0 on aggregate. In that same season, they reached the 1st round of the Polish Cup but were knocked out by Górnik Konin following a 3–1 loss. After the 2006–07 season, the reserve teams were scrapped in favour of a central youth league, meaning that between 2007 and 2013 the team ceased to exist. They were reinstated to their previous league position for the 2013–14 season.

=== Lech Poznań UAM ===
Lech's women section was opened on 26 August 2021. It was formed through a partnership with Adam Mickiewicz University in Poznań. It currently competes in the top division after three promotions in four years, and is coached by Alicja Zając.

=== Lech Poznań Academy ===
The Lech Poznań Academy (Polish: Akademia Lecha Poznań) is the club's youth system, with several teams across all children's ages up until its most senior U-19 youth team. The teams play in the Central Junior League, which was at first formed to replace the clubs' reserve teams which participated in the league pyramid. The club's youth system is the most extensive and advanced in the country and has produced many players which went on to play in the senior team.

== KKS Wiara Lecha ==
KKS Wiara Lecha is a football club founded by Lech Poznań supporters in 2011. Only active supporters can play in the team and they have to have made a contribution to the supporter scene in order to be admitted to the squad.

== Managers ==
- (Poland) Stanisław Kwiatkowski (January 1932 – June 1936)
- (Hungary) László Marcai (July 1936 – 10 May 1938)
- (Poland) A. Klemens Pawlak (11 May 1938 – August 1939)
- (Poland) Franciszek Bródka (July 1945 – 15 August 1946)
- (Slovakia) Pavel Lovas (15 August 1946 – 28 March 1947)
- (Poland) Franciszek Bródka (April 1947 – May 1948)
- (France) Marcel Demeunyck (June 1948 – 28 February 1949)
- (Poland) Antoni Böttcher (1 March 1949 – 31 December 1949)
- (Poland) Artur Walter (1 January 1950 – 31 May 1950)
- (Poland) Antoni Böttcher & (Poland) F. Bródka (1 June 1950 – 8 June 1951)
- (Poland) Mieczysław Balcer (8 June 1951 – 31 December 1952)
- (Poland) Artur Woźniak (1 January 1953 – 31 December 1953)
- (Poland) Mieczysław Tarka (1 January 1954 – 4 June 1957)
- (Poland) Edmund Białas (4 June 1957 – 31 July 1957)
- (Czech Republic) Vilém Lugr (1 August 1957 – 31 November 1958)
- (Poland) Henryk Czapczyk (1 December 1959 – 10 September 1961)
- (Poland) Mieczysław Tarka (10 September 1961 – 15 November 1962)
- (Poland) Zygfryd Słoma (16 November 1962 – 30 June 1963)
- (Poland) Edward Drabiński (1 August 1963 – 14 April 1964)
- (Poland) Henryk Czapczyk (15 April 1964 – 15 June 1964)
- (Poland) Zygfryd Słoma (16 July 1964 – 5 September 1965)
- (Poland) Edmund Białas (12 September 1965 – 10 May 1966)
- (Poland) Edward Brzozowski (10 May 1966 – 3 July 1966)
- (Poland) Edmund Białas (4 July 1966 – 10 October 1966)
- (Poland) Mieczysław Tarka (10 October 1966 – 31 December 1968)
- (Poland) Edmund Białas (1 September 1969 – 30 June 1972)
- (Poland) Mieczysław Chudziak (1 July 1972 – 16 August 1972)
- (Poland) Augustyn Dziwisz (16 August 1972 – 6 April 1973)
- (Poland) Janusz Pekowski (7 April 1973 – 30 June 1975)
- (Poland) Aleksander Hradecki (1 July 1975 – 31 March 1976)
- (Poland) E. Białas & (Poland) M. Chudziak (1 April 1976 – 30 September 1976)
- (Poland) Jerzy Kopa (1 October 1976 – 20 October 1979)
- (Poland) Roman Łoś (26 August 1978, 20 October 1979 – 31 December 1979)
- (Poland) Wojciech Łazarek (1 January 1980 – 31 December 1984)
- (Poland) Leszek Jezierski & Jacek Machciński (1 January 1985 – 26 May 1985)
- (Poland) Włodzimierz Jakubowski (27 May 1985 – 30 November 1986)
- (Poland) Bronisław Waligóra (1 December 1986 – 31 August 1987)
- (Poland) J. Kasalik & (Poland) T. Napierała (9 May 1987 – 23 May 1987, 5 September 1987)
- (Poland) Grzegorz Szerszenowicz (7 September 1987 – 30 June 1988)
- (Poland) Henryk Apostel (1 July 1988 – 30 November 1988)
- (Poland) Andrzej Strugarek (12 December 1988 – 22 August 1989)
- (Poland) J. Kopa & (Poland) A. Strugarek (22 August 1989 – 19 May 1991)
- (Poland) Henryk Apostel (20 May 1991 – 5 April 1993)
- (Poland) Roman Jakóbczak (6 April 1993 – 19 October 1993)
- (Poland) Jan Stępczak (20 November 1993 – 30 June 1994)
- (Poland) Ryszard Matłoka (caretaker) (19 March 1994)
- (Poland) Romuald Szukiełowicz (1 July 1994 – 30 June 1995)
- (Poland) Zbigniew Franiak (1 July 1995 – 9 May 1996)
- (Poland) Remigiusz Marchlewicz (9 May 1996 – 30 June 1996)
- (Poland) Ryszard Polak (1 July 1996 – 15 May 1997)
- (Poland) Remigiusz Marchlewicz (16 May 1997 – 30 June 1997)
- (Poland) Krzysztof Pawlak (1 July 1997 – 18 March 1998)
- (Poland) Remigiusz Marchlewicz (caretaker) (18 March 1998 – 23 March 1998)
- (Poland) Jerzy Kopa (23 March 1998 – 29 April 1998)
- (Poland) Remigiusz Marchlewicz (29 April 1998 – 16 May 1998)
- (Poland) Adam Topolski (17 May 1998 – 5 September 1999)
- (Poland) Marian Kurowski (9 September 1999 – 9 April 2000)
- (Poland) Zbigniew Franiak (caretaker) (10 April 2000 – 17 April 2000)
- (Poland) Wojciech Wąsikiewicz (17 April 2000 – 28 May 2000)
- (Austria) Adolf Pinter (29 May 2000 – 28 August 2000)
- (Poland) Adam Topolski (29 August 2000 – 1 April 2001)
- (Poland) Bogusław Baniak (2 April 2001 – 28 September 2002)
- (Poland) Czesław Jakołcewicz (caretaker) (29 September 2002 – 26 November 2002)
- (Czech Republic) Bohumil Páník (26 November 2002 – 30 June 2003)
- (Czech Republic) Libor Pala (30 June 2003 – 14 September 2003)
- (Poland) Czesław Michniewicz (14 September 2003 – 30 June 2006)
- (Poland) Franciszek Smuda (30 June 2006 – 30 June 2009)
- (Poland) Jacek Zieliński (30 June 2009 – 2 November 2010)
- (Spain) José Mari Bakero (3 November 2010 – 25 February 2012)
- (Poland) Mariusz Rumak (27 February 2012 – 12 August 2014)
- (Poland) Krzysztof Chrobak (caretaker) (12 August 2014 – 1 September 2014)
- (Poland) Maciej Skorża (1 September 2014 – 12 October 2015)
- (Poland) Jan Urban (12 October 2015 – 29 August 2016)
- (Croatia) Nenad Bjelica (30 August 2016 – 10 May 2018)
- (Poland) Rafał Ulatowski (caretaker) (10 May 2018 – 20 May 2018)
- (Serbia) Ivan Đurđević (21 May 2018 – 4 November 2018)
- (Poland) Dariusz Żuraw (caretaker) (4 November 2018 – 25 November 2018)
- (Poland) Adam Nawałka (25 November 2018 – 31 March 2019)
- (Poland) Dariusz Żuraw (1 April 2019 – 6 April 2021)
- (Poland) Janusz Góra (caretaker) (7 April 2021 – 11 April 2021)
- (Poland) Maciej Skorża (12 April 2021 – 6 June 2022)
- (Netherlands) John van den Brom (19 June 2022 – 17 December 2023)
- (Poland) Mariusz Rumak (17 December 2023 – 30 June 2024)
- (Denmark) Niels Frederiksen (1 July 2024 – present)

== See also ==
- Football in Poland
- List of football teams
- Champions' Cup/League
- UEFA Cup

== Bibliography ==
- Jarosław Owsiański, Lech Poznań – przemilczana prawda (in Polish), Poznań: Drukarnia Beyga, 2017, ISBN 978-83-939221-6-1.
