= Edmund Białas =

Polish footballer (1919–1991)

Personal information
- Date of birth: 15 August 1919
- Place of birth: Poznań, Poland
- Date of death: 24 July 1991 (aged 71)
- Place of death: Poznań, Poland
- Height: 1.70 m (5 ft 7 in)
- Position: Striker

Senior career*
Years	Team	Apps	(Gls)
1934–1939	Lech Poznań		
1945–1951	Lech Poznań		

International career
1948	Poland	2	(0)

Managerial career
- 1957: Lech Poznań
- 1965–1966: Lech Poznań
- 1966: Lech Poznań
- 1969–1972: Lech Poznań
- 1976: Lech Poznań
- * Club domestic league appearances and goals

Edmund Białas (15 August 1919 – 24 July 1991) was a Polish footballer who played for and managed Lech Poznań.

He first started playing for Lech Poznań in 1931, and continued through to play for the Poland national team for eight years. He expected to play more in his early professional years, but the outbreak of the World War II stopped matches from taking place, most notably one in which he participated against Bulgaria which was abandoned mid-match.

In total, Białas made 64 top division appearances for Lech, scoring 27 goals. He later became a football manager and instructor for Lech after his retirement in 1951.

== Honours ==
=== Manager ===
Lech Poznań

- III liga, group IV: 1970–71
