= Grunwald Poznań (handball) =

Polish handball club

WKS Grunwald Poznań
- Full name: Wojskowy Klub Sportowy Grunwald Poznań
- Founded: 1961; 64 years ago
- Arena: Hala SP 72
- President: Jakub Pochopień
- Head coach: Michał Tórz
- League: I liga
- Club colours
| Home | Away |

WKS Grunwald Poznań is a men's handball club based in Poznań, Poland, founded in 1961 as a section of the wider multi-sports club. A one time Polish Champion and three–time Polish Cup winner in the 70s; the club currently plays in the Polish I liga (as of the 2022–23).

== Honours ==
=== Domestic ===
- Polish Superliga

Winners (1): 1970–71
Runners-up (2): 1971–72, 1990–91

- Polish Cup

Winners (3): 1971–72, 1978–79, 1979–80

== Bibliography ==
- Kronika Miasta Poznania - SPORT 1 (in Polish). Poznań: Wydawnictwo Miejskie. 2010.
- E. Baumann (1987). Zarys 40 lat WKS Grunwald w Poznaniu (1947-1987) (in Polish). Poznań.
- Bernard Woltmann. 75 lat Poznańskiego ZPN (in Polish).
