= Polonia Nowy Tomyśl =

- Full name: Nowotomyska Akademia Piłkarska; Polonia Nowy Tomyśl
- Founded: 12 September 1922; 102 years ago (as Huragan Nowy Tomyśl); July 2012; 12 years ago (refounded)
- Ground: Stadion Miejski
- Capacity: 3,147
- Chairman: Piotr Kostecki
- League: Dawid Kaniewski
- Website: https://napnt.pl/strona/
Home colours	Away colours

Polonia Nowy Tomyśl is a Polish football club located in the town of Nowy Tomyśl, Greater Poland Voivodeship.

== History ==
Polonia Nowy Tomyśl was established in 1922, and for much of its history has competed in lower regional and amateur leagues in Poland. The club first gained promotion to the senior league system in 1958, reaching the III liga, which was then a league at the third tier of the Polish football pyramid. It repeated this achievement in 1992, before suffering a series of relegations to the regional leagues at the sixth tier level. In the 21st century, the club has made significant progress back up the league system, achieving promotions to the IV liga (2004), the III liga (2008) and the II liga West (2010).

After the end of the 2011–12 season of the IV liga Greater Poland, the team was dissolved. In 2016, it was reactivated under the name of Nowotomyska Akademia Piłkarska Polonia Nowy Tomyśl, a new entity continuing the traditions of Polonia, and joined the Klasa A. They withdrew their senior team during the winter break of the 2022–23 season, and, as of May 2024, were in the process of re-establishing it.

== Honours ==
- III liga (Kuyavia-Pomerania-Wielkopolska)
  - Champions: 2009–10
- Regional league (Poznań)
  - Champions: 2003–04

== See also ==
- Football in Poland
