= Grunwald Poznań (sports club) =

Polish sports club

Coordinates: 52°23′47″N 16°53′00″E

WKS Grunwald Poznań
- Full name: Military Sports Club Grunwald Poznań (Polish: Wojskowy Klub Sportowy Grunwald Poznań)
- Founded: 12 September 1947
- Based in: Poznań, Poland
- Colors
- President: Lech Konopka
- Secretary: Dariusz Przybylski
- Website: http://www.wks-grunwald.poznan.pl/

WKS Grunwald Poznań is a multi-sports club based in Poznań, Poland. The handball section had been champions several times whereas the field hockey section is one of the top teams not only in the country but in Europe. Other sections have been champions in Poland and have had Olympic representation.

== Naming history ==
- 1947–1950: Wojskowy Klub Sportowy "Kadra" Poznań
- 1950–1957: Wojskowy Klub Sportowy Poznań
- 1957–present: Wojskowy Klub Sportowy Grunwald Poznań

== Establishment ==
The club was founded by a group of officers and deputy officers of the Poznań garrison. The founding meeting was held at the seat of the Municipal Office of Physical Education and Military Training at ul. Matejki 61. The name of WKS Kadra Poznań and the club's statute were established, the management board, the audit committee and the court of honor were elected. Kazimierz Gawrycki, the then commander of the MUWFiPW in Poznań, became the first president. The first sports sections were also established: football, boxing, athletics, shooting and tennis.

== Sections ==
=== Active ===
The club has several active sections: athletics, field hockey, freestyle wrestling, handball, orienteering, shooting, taekwondo and tennis.

==== Athletics and orienteering ====
The orienteering section was founded in 1987. The first success of the section was winning in 1988 the gold medal of the Polish Championships in the relay, the team consisting of: Gliszczyński, Domagała, Niedzielski. In 1993 they recorded the first international success; the bronze medal at the Junior World Championships was won in the relay race by Robert Banach and Dariusz Mikusiński. Then came further successes: Dariusz Mikusiński became the vice-champion of the CISM Army World Championships, and Robert Banach became the Junior World Champion. The silver medal of the Championship was won by Janusz Gliszczyński, and the relay race with Małgorzata Stankiewicz came third. In the following years, Robert Banach and Sławomir Woźniak also won medals at the CISM World Military Championships. Since the founding of the section, its athletes have won over 300 Polish Championship medals. This success is largely attributed to long-serving coach Tadeusz Rutkowski, who over the years raised several generations of athletes who represented Poland in international competitions. Currently, 23 professional athletes belong to the section, and Bartosz Pawlak and Michał Olejnik are among the national leaders in their disciplines.

In the athletics section, training is focused on senior squad, which currently has six professional athletes. Since its inception, the athletes have also won a large number of medals in the Polish Championships, as well as many medals in the World and European Military Championships. Competitors such as Henryk Szost, Michał Kaczmarek, Mariusz Giżyński and Monika Stefanowicz have repeatedly won individual and team medals in the military championships, and Henryk Szost is the current country record holder in the marathon with a time of 2:07:39.

==== Field hockey ====
The section was officially founded in 1952, after takeover of a 3 -time champion military club WKS Poznań dating back to the inter-war period The section is the most successful club in the country, a European contender since the early 90s and dominant force domestically, both traditional outdoor and indoor in equal measure.

==== Handball ====
The handball section is historically one of the most successful, and was a dominant force in the country in the 70s and 80s.

==== Freestyle wrestling ====
The freestyle wrestling section was founded in 1951, where recruitment was organised through the local press.

The most notable athletes were Władysław Stecyk, Grunwald athlete in 1969–1988; and Monika Michalik, bronze medalist of the 2016 Rio de Janeiro Olynpics and gold medalist of the 2017 European Wrestling Championships in Novi Sad. Paweł Kurczewski was the world silver medalist in 1971, and Adam Sobieraj won the bronze medal at the 2010 European Wrestling Championships. The club also has produced numerous Olympians regularly throughout its history.

As a team they won the third division in their debut year in 1951 and the second division in 1952, winning promotion to the top division. They won the second division in 1970 and the Polish championship in 1972.

==== Shooting ====
The shooting section was founded on 12 March 1963. The club is a member of PZSS and WZSS.

==== Tennis ====
The tennis section was one of the first section founded upon establishment of the club, in 1947. However the section initially survived only until 1951. It was reactivated in the years 1959 to 1967. After this period, the section was only re-established 46 years later, on 11 June 2003. As a junior, the club was represented by Magda Linette with successes at junior level. The section currently has 8 courts of which 2 are covered. The club won the women's team championships in 2010 and 2011.

=== Defunct ===
The following sections have existed in the past: association football, boxing, rowing, table tennis.

==== Association football ====
Football was the first section to be created upon establishment of the club, and existed between 1947 and 1985. Although not the most successful section of the club by any means, it did reach the higher echelons of the league pyramid and did reach the latter stages of the Polish Cup twice; in the 1966–67 and 1975–76 seasons.

== Bibliography ==
- Kronika Miasta Poznania - SPORT 1 (in Polish). Poznań: Wydawnictwo Miejskie. 2010.
- E. Baumann (1987). Zarys 40 lat WKS Grunwald w Poznaniu (1947-1987) (in Polish). Poznań.
- Bernard Woltmann. 75 lat Poznańskiego ZPN (in Polish).
