= Grunwald Poznań (football) =

WKS Grunwald Poznań
- Full name: Wojskowy Klub Sportowy Grunwald Poznań
- Nicknames: Wojskowi {The Militaries); Grunwald; WKS
- Short name: WKS Grunwald
- Founded: 12 September 1947; 78 years ago
- Dissolved: 1 June 1985; 40 years ago
- League: III liga
- 1984–85: 12th (relegated)
| colours | colours |

WKS Grunwald Poznań was a Polish football team based in Poznań and section of the wider multi-sports club.

== History ==
It was the first section to be created upon establishment of the club. Having spent the majority of its years in either the regional leagues or the third division, their highlights were reaching the 1st round of the 1966–67 and 1/16th of the 1975–76 Polish Cup losing 2–0 to Zagłębie Wałbrzych and Polonia Bytom respectively. After relegation from the third tier in 1985 the section was disbanded.

== Notable players ==
Its most notable players were Walenty Czarnecki and Remigiusz Marchlewicz.

== Bibliography ==
- Kronika Miasta Poznania - SPORT 1 (in Polish). Poznań: Wydawnictwo Miejskie. 2010.
- E. Baumann (1987). Zarys 40 lat WKS Grunwald w Poznaniu (1947-1987) (in Polish). Poznań.
- Bernard Woltmann. 75 lat Poznańskiego ZPN (in Polish).
