= Polonia Poznań =

Polish omnisport club

- Full name: Towarzystwo Sportowe Polonia Poznań
- Founded: 1921; 105 years ago
- Ground: Harcerska Street Stadium
- Capacity: 300
- Chairman: Radosław Matysiak
- Manager: Radosław Matysiak
- League: Regional league Greater Poland II
- 2025–26: Regional league Greater Poland II, 4th of 16
Home colours	Away colours

Polonia Poznań is an omnisport club based in Poznań, Poland. Currently, the men's football section competes in the Greater Poland II group of the regional league. From 2009 to 2020, Polonia also operated a women's football section.

In the past the club had many successful sections, with the rugby section a five-time Polish champion. However, today rowing is the only other existing section.
