= 1983–84 Ekstraklasa =

58th season of top-tier football league in Poland

Liga
- Season: 1983–84
- Champions: Lech Poznań (2nd title)
- Relegated: KS Cracovia; Szombierki Bytom
- Matches: 240
- Goals: 548 (2.28 per match)
- Top goalscorer: Włodzimierz Ciołek (14 goals)
- Average attendance: 12,066 ▲25.7%

Statistics of Ekstraklasa for the 1983–84 season.

== Overview ==
It was contested by 16 teams, and Lech Poznań won the championship.

== League table ==
Pos	Team	Pld	W	D	L	GF	GA	GD	Pts	Qualification or relegation
1	Lech Poznań (C)	30	19	4	7	47	21	+26	42	Qualification to European Cup first round
2	Widzew Łódź	30	15	12	3	43	25	+18	42	Qualification to UEFA Cup first round
3	Pogoń Szczecin	30	16	6	8	54	27	+27	38	Qualification to UEFA Cup first round
4	Górnik Zabrze	30	12	10	8	34	26	+8	34	
5	Legia Warsaw	30	12	9	9	42	32	+10	33	
6	Górnik Wałbrzych	30	11	9	10	40	35	+5	31	
7	Ruch Chorzów	30	11	8	11	30	30	0	30	
8	Śląsk Wrocław	30	11	8	11	41	47	−6	30	
9	GKS Katowice	30	11	7	12	41	42	−1	29	
10	Motor Lublin	30	8	13	9	22	24	−2	29	
11	Wisła Kraków	30	8	11	11	33	38	−5	27	Qualification to Cup Winners' Cup first round
12	Zagłębie Sosnowiec	30	7	13	10	25	35	−10	27	
13	Bałtyk Gdynia	30	7	11	12	25	30	−5	25	
14	ŁKS Łódź	30	8	9	13	29	43	−14	25	
15	KS Cracovia (R)	30	6	9	15	19	35	−16	21	Relegated to II liga
16	Szombierki Bytom (R)	30	5	7	18	23	58	−35	17	Relegated to II liga

Source: 90minut.pl (in Polish)
(C) Champions; (R) Relegated

== Results ==
Home \ Away	BGD	CRA	KAT	GWŁ	GÓR	LPO	LEG	ŁKS	MOL	POG	RUC	SZB	ŚLĄ	WID	WIS	ZSO
Bałtyk Gdynia		3–2	1–1	0–0	0–0	3–1	0–0	0–0	0–1	1–0	0–1	2–0	2–1	0–2	0–0	0–0
Cracovia	0–2		1–0	1–0	0–1	1–0	3–1	0–0	0–0	1–2	1–0	3–0	1–1	0–0	0–0	0–0
GKS Katowice	4–0	0–0		1–1	1–0	2–0	1–1	2–0	0–1	1–2	0–2	3–1	2–1	1–2	5–2	0–0
Górnik Wałbrzych	3–2	2–0	3–1		1–2	0–1	4–1	1–0	2–0	1–1	2–1	2–0	0–1	1–4	5–1	1–1
Górnik Zabrze	2–1	3–2	1–2	0–0		1–0	1–0	1–1	1–1	1–0	1–2	4–0	2–2	1–1	1–1	2–0
Lech Poznań	1–0	1–0	3–0	2–0	1–0		2–1	4–0	2–0	1–1	3–1	1–0	6–0	0–1	1–0	1–0
Legia Warsaw	1–0	3–0	4–2	5–0	0–1	0–2		4–2	1–0	2–1	0–2	3–0	1–0	0–0	4–2	1–2
ŁKS Łódź	2–1	3–0	2–2	2–2	2–1	1–4	1–1		1–2	1–0	1–0	1–0	0–1	3–3	1–0	0–0
Motor Lublin	1–1	2–0	1–2	1–1	0–0	1–2	1–1	0–0		1–0	0–0	0–0	3–0	1–1	1–2	2–0
Pogoń Szczecin	1–1	3–0	4–0	1–0	1–0	2–0	0–2	2–0	2–0		2–0	8–1	2–1	2–0	2–1	3–1
Ruch Chorzów	0–0	2–0	0–2	1–2	1–2	2–2	1–1	2–1	0–1	0–4		1–0	2–1	0–0	2–0	2–0
Szombierki Bytom	0–2	3–2	1–4	1–1	0–1	1–1	2–2	0–2	2–0	2–1	2–1		0–2	2–4	0–0	1–0
Śląsk Wrocław	1–0	2–1	3–2	0–3	2–2	0–2	1–1	4–0	2–0	3–3	0–0	3–2		2–2	3–2	2–0
Widzew Łódź	2–1	1–0	0–0	1–0	1–0	2–0	1–0	3–1	0–0	2–1	0–2	2–2	0–0		4–2	3–0
Wisła Kraków	1–0	0–0	3–0	1–0	2–2	0–0	0–1	1–0	0–0	1–1	1–1	2–0	3–1	1–1		0–1
Zagłębie Sosnowiec	2–2	0–0	2–0	2–2	1–0	1–3	0–0	2–1	1–1	2–2	1–1	0–0	3–1	2–0	1–4	

Source: 90minut.pl (in Polish)
Legend: Blue = home team win; Yellow = draw; Red = away team win.

== Top goalscorers ==
Rank	Player	Club	Goals
1	(Poland) Włodzimierz Ciołek	Górnik Wałbrzych	14
2	(Poland) Marek Leśniak	Pogoń Szczecin	12
2	(Poland) Adam Kensy	Pogoń Szczecin	12
4	(Poland) Jan Furtok	GKS Katowice	11
4	(Poland) Andrzej Iwan	Wisła Kraków	11
6	(Poland) Dariusz Dziekanowski	Widzew Łódź	10
6	(Poland) Ryszard Tarasiewicz	Śląsk Wrocław	10
6	(Poland) Mirosław Okoński	Lech Poznań	10
6	(Poland) Zbigniew Stelmasiak	Górnik Wałbrzych	10
6	(Poland) Krzystof Rzeszutek	GKS Katowice	10

== Attendances ==
#	Football club	Average
1	Lech Poznań	29,536
2	Górnik Wałbrzych	24,267
3	Motor Lublin	17,667
4	Widzew Łódź	17,267
5	Pogoń Szczecin	15,733
6	Legia Warszawa	13,067
7	Śląsk Wrocław	10,200
8	Górnik Zabrze	10,000
9	Ruch Chorzów	9,467
10	Cracovia	8,933
11	ŁKS	8,733
12	Wisła Kraków	7,367
13	Zagłębie Sosnowiec	7,067
14	GKS Katowice	5,933
15	Bałtyk Gdynia	5,580
16	Szombierki Bytom	2,240
