= 1982–83 Ekstraklasa =

57th season of top-tier football league in Poland

Liga
- Season: 1982–83
- Champions: Lech Poznań (1st title)
- Relegated: Stal Mielec; Gwardia Warsaw
- Matches: 240
- Goals: 550 (2.29 per match)
- Top goalscorer: Mirosław Okoński; Mirosław Tłokiński (15 goals)
- Average attendance: 9,598 ▼2.2%

Statistics of Ekstraklasa for the 1982–83 season.

== Overview ==
It was contested by 16 teams, and Lech Poznań won the championship.

== League table ==
Pos	Team	Pld	W	D	L	GF	GA	GD	Pts	Qualification or relegation
1	Lech Poznań (C)	30	17	5	8	42	31	+11	39	Qualification to European Cup first round
2	Widzew Łódź	30	13	12	5	50	30	+20	38	Qualification to UEFA Cup first round
3	Ruch Chorzów	30	11	13	6	34	22	+12	35	
4	Pogoń Szczecin	30	12	9	9	44	28	+16	33	
5	Wisła Kraków	30	13	6	11	44	36	+8	32	
6	Śląsk Wrocław	30	12	6	12	35	34	+1	30	
7	ŁKS Łódź	30	10	10	10	36	38	−2	30	
8	Legia Warsaw	30	11	7	12	43	39	+4	29	
9	Szombierki Bytom	30	8	13	9	34	37	−3	29	
10	Bałtyk Gdynia	30	9	11	10	28	31	−3	29	
11	Zagłębie Sosnowiec	30	10	9	11	29	37	−8	29	
12	Górnik Zabrze	30	10	8	12	30	38	−8	28	
13	GKS Katowice	30	10	7	13	28	34	−6	27	
14	KS Cracovia	30	6	15	9	20	33	−13	27	
15	Stal Mielec (R)	30	7	10	13	27	36	−9	24	Relegated to II liga
16	Gwardia Warsaw (R)	30	7	7	16	26	46	−20	21	Relegated to II liga

Source: 90minut.pl (in Polish)
(C) Champions; (R) Relegated

== Results ==
Home \ Away	BGD	CRA	KAT	GÓR	GWA	LPO	LEG	ŁKS	POG	RUC	STA	SZB	ŚLĄ	WID	WIS	ZSO
Bałtyk Gdynia		0–0	2–1	3–2	2–1	1–1	1–2	1–1	2–1	2–0	2–1	2–0	1–0	1–1	1–0	0–0
Cracovia	0–0		0–0	0–0	1–0	0–2	1–0	2–2	3–0	0–1	1–1	0–0	1–0	2–2	2–1	2–1
GKS Katowice	2–2	2–0		1–0	3–0	0–1	3–1	2–1	0–1	0–0	0–0	1–1	2–1	1–0	1–3	3–0
Górnik Zabrze	2–0	0–0	0–2		2–0	0–2	2–2	1–1	3–2	2–1	1–0	0–0	1–0	1–1	1–3	2–0
Gwardia Warsaw	1–0	1–0	1–0	0–2		1–0	1–2	2–0	1–1	2–1	1–1	0–0	1–1	0–2	1–0	2–3
Lech Poznań	2–0	2–1	1–0	2–1	3–2		1–0	2–1	1–0	1–1	1–0	4–1	2–0	3–1	3–1	2–2
Legia Warsaw	2–0	0–0	1–0	6–0	3–1	1–0		0–1	2–3	2–2	2–2	2–2	1–0	4–2	0–2	2–1
ŁKS Łódź	1–0	1–1	2–0	2–0	1–1	2–1	1–0		3–2	0–0	3–1	4–2	0–4	0–0	2–2	1–2
Pogoń Szczecin	0–0	4–0	6–0	1–0	2–0	2–0	1–1	3–1		2–2	4–1	0–0	1–1	0–1	3–0	1–0
Ruch Chorzów	1–0	0–0	1–1	1–1	2–0	1–0	0–1	1–1	1–1		3–0	1–0	2–0	1–0	4–0	1–2
Stal Mielec	0–0	2–1	1–1	1–2	1–1	0–1	2–1	1–0	1–0	0–1		2–0	3–0	2–3	1–2	0–1
Szombierki Bytom	3–1	2–0	1–0	3–2	3–2	2–2	1–0	2–0	0–0	1–1	1–1		0–0	0–0	0–1	0–2
Śląsk Wrocław	2–1	2–2	1–0	2–0	3–0	2–1	1–1	0–2	2–1	1–1	2–0	2–1		2–1	2–1	3–0
Widzew Łódź	3–3	7–0	3–0	1–0	2–1	2–1	2–1	3–1	1–1	0–0	1–1	2–2	2–0		2–0	3–0
Wisła Kraków	1–0	0–0	3–0	0–1	1–1	6–0	4–3	1–1	0–1	2–1	0–1	3–1	3–1	1–1		2–0
Zagłębie Sosnowiec	0–0	0–0	0–2	1–1	4–1	0–0	2–0	1–0	1–0	0–2	0–0	2–5	2–0	1–1	1–1	

Source: 90minut.pl (in Polish)
Legend: Blue = home team win; Yellow = draw; Red = away team win.

== Top goalscorers ==
Rank	Player	Club	Goals
1	(Poland) Mirosław Okoński	Lech Poznań	15
1	(Poland) Mirosław Tłokiński	Widzew Łódź	15
3	(Poland) Zbigniew Stelmasiak	Pogoń Szczecin	13
4	(Poland) Zdzisław Kapka	Wisła Kraków	12
5	(Poland) Włodzimierz Smolarek	Widzew Łódź	10
5	(Poland) Jarosław Biernat	Pogoń Szczecin	10
7	(Poland) Jan Furtok	GKS Katowice	9
7	(Poland) Grzegorz Kapica	Szombierki Bytom	9
7	(Poland) Mirosław Pękala	Śląsk Wrocław	9
7	(Poland) Kazimierz Buda	Stal Mielec	9
7	(Poland) Janusz Kupcewicz	Lech Poznań	9
7	(Poland) Andrzej Milczarski	ŁKS Łódź	9

== Attendances ==
#	Football club	Average
1	Lech Poznań	23,533
2	Pogoń Szczecin	15,667
3	Cracovia	13,867
4	Widzew Łódź	12,600
5	Ruch Chorzów	12,000
6	Legia Warszawa	11,267
7	Śląsk Wrocław	10,733
8	Wisła Kraków	10,533
9	Stal Mielec	7,933
10	Górnik Zabrze	6,867
11	Bałtyk Gdynia	6,400
12	ŁKS	6,300
13	GKS Katowice	6,167
14	Gwardia Warszawa	3,300
15	Szombierki Bytom	3,273
16	Zagłębie Sosnowiec	3,133
