= Jarota Jarocin =

Polish football club

- Full name: Jarociński Klub Sportowy; Jarota Jarocin
- Founded: 16 June 1998; 28 years ago
- Ground: Municipal Stadium
- Capacity: 2,500
- Chairman: Krzysztof Matuszak
- Manager: Paweł Kryś
- League: V liga Greater Poland III
- 2024–25: IV liga Greater Poland, 17th of 18 (relegated)
- Website: jarota.com
Home colours

Jarota Jarocin is a football club based in Jarocin, Poland. They compete in V liga Greater Poland III, the sixth flight of domestic football.
