= List of foreign Ligue 1 players: P =

This is a list of foreign players in the French Ligue 1, which commenced play in 1932. The following players must meet both of the following two criteria:

1. Have played at least one Ligue 1 game. Players who were signed by Ligue 1 clubs, but only played in lower league, cup and/or European games, or did not play in any competitive games at all, are not included.
2. Are considered foreign, i.e., outside France and its dependencies (Guadeloupe, Martinique, Reunion Island or French Polynesia), determined by the following:

A player is considered foreign if he is not eligible to play for the national teams of France.

More specifically,

- If a player has been capped on international level, the national team is used; if he has been capped by more than one country, the highest level (or the most recent) team is used. These include French players with dual citizenship. Players who played for France but came as foreign players (such as Miguel Ángel Lauri) are also listed.
- If a player has not been capped on international level, his country of birth is used, except those who were born abroad from French parents or moved to France at a young age, and those who clearly indicated to have switched his nationality to another nation.

Clubs listed are those that the player has played at least one Ligue 1 game for.

Seasons listed are those that the player has played at least one Ligue 1 game in. Note that seasons, not calendar years, are used. For example, "1992–95" indicates that the player has played in every season from 1992–93 to 1994–95, but not necessarily every calendar year from 1992 to 1995.

In bold: players still active in Ligue 1 and their respective teams in current season.

== Panama ==
- Julio Dely Valdés – Paris – 1995–97
- Amir Murillo – Marseille – 2023–26

== Paraguay ==
- Antonio Acosta – Metz – 1953–58
- Júnior Alonso – Lille – 2016–18
- Manuel Andrada – Nîmes – 1952–57
- Milner Ayala – Strasbourg – 1953–55
- Lucas Barrios – Montpellier – 2014–15
- Eugenio Jesus Berni Gomez – CO Roubaix-Tourcoing – 1954–56
- Roberto Cabañas – Brest, Lyon – 1989–90, 1990–92
- Julio César Cáceres – Nantes – 2004–05
- José Luis Chilavert – Strasbourg – 2000–01
- Heriberto Correa – Monaco – 1977–78
- Andrés Cubas – Nîmes – 2020–21
- Carlos Diarte – Saint-Étienne – 1983–84
- Julio Enciso – Strasbourg – 2025–26
- Marcelo Estigarribia – Le Mans – 2008–10
- Sebastián Fleitas – Nîmes – 1972–73
- **Orlando Gill** – **Lille** – 2026–
- Adolfo Godoy – Rouen – 1967–68
- Hugo González – Red Star – 1971–73, 1974–75
- Ángel Jara – Toulouse FC (1937), Red Star – 1962–66
- Alfredo Mendoza – Brest – 1989–91
- Carlos Monín – Toulouse FC (1937), Red Star – 1964–73
- José Parodi – Nîmes – 1961–67
- Federico Santander – Toulouse FC – 2010–11
- Leongino Unzain – Béziers – 1957–58

== Peru ==
- Wilmer Aguirre – Metz – 2007–08
- Cristian Benavente – Nantes – 2019–20
- Manuel Corrales – Metz – 2007–08
- Jean Deza – Montpellier – 2013–16
- Raúl Fernández – Nice – 2011–12
- Andrés Mendoza – Marseille – 2005–06
- Percy Prado – Nantes – 2019–20
- Miguel Trauco – Saint-Étienne – 2019–22

== Poland ==
- Jacek Bąk – Lyon, Lens – 1995–2005
- Dariusz Bayer – Valenciennes – 1992–93
- Bernard Blaut – Metz – 1972–74
- Adam Buksa – Lens – 2022–23
- Bronisław Bula – Rouen – 1982–83
- Marcin Bułka – Paris SG, Nice – 2019–25
- Ryszard Czerwiec – Guingamp – 1997–98
- Jan Domarski – Nîmes Olympique – 1976–78
- Dariusz Dudka – Auxerre – 2008–12
- Eugeniusz Faber – Lens – 1973–75
- Karol Fila – Strasbourg – 2021–23, 2024–25
- Krzysztof Frankowski – Nantes, Le Havre – 1983–88
- **Przemysław Frankowski** – Lens, **Rennes** – 2021–
- Tomasz Frankowski – Strasbourg – 1994–96
- Dominik Furman – Toulouse – 2014–16
- Robert Gadocha – Nantes – 1975–77
- Kamil Glik – Monaco – 2016–20
- Kamil Grosicki – Rennes – 2014–17
- Ryszard Grzegorczyk – Lens – 1973–75
- Paweł Janas – Auxerre – 1982–86
- Andrzej Jarosik – Strasbourg – 1974–76
- Ireneusz Jeleń – Auxerre, Lille – 2006–12
- Marek Jóźwiak – Guingamp – 1996–98, 2000–01
- Zbigniew Kaczmarek – Auxerre – 1990–92
- Henryk Kasperczak – Metz – 1978–80
- Tomasz Kłos – Auxerre – 1998–2000
- Józef Klose – Auxerre – 1980–81
- Roman Kosecki – Nantes, Montpellier – 1995–97
- Grzegorz Krychowiak – Bordeaux, Reims, Paris SG – 2011–14, 2016–17
- Andrzej Kubica – Nice – 1996–97
- Janusz Kupcewicz – Saint-Étienne – 1983–84
- Rafał Kurzawa – Amiens – 2018–19
- Marcin Kuźba – Auxerre – 1998–99
- Grzegorz Lewandowski – Caen – 1996–97
- Igor Lewczuk – Bordeaux – 2016–19
- Mateusz Lis – Troyes – 2022–23
- Henryk Maculewicz – Lens – 1979–81
- Radosław Majecki – Monaco, Brest – 2020–21, 2023–26
- Joachim Marx – Lens – 1975–78
- Krzysztof Marx – Bordeaux – 1990–91
- Zygmunt Maszczyk – Valenciennes – 1976–79
- Waldemar Matysik – Auxerre – 1987–90
- Włodzimierz Mazur – Rennes – 1983–84
- Arkadiusz Milik – Marseille – 2020–23
- Henryk Miłoszewicz – Le Havre – 1985–86
- Józef Młynarczyk – Bastia – 1984–86
- Eugeniusz Nagiel – Valenciennes – 1981–82
- **Maik Nawrocki** – **Lens** – 2026–
- Ludovic Obraniak – Metz, Lille, Bordeaux – 2003–14
- Roman Ogaza – Lens – 1982–84
- Paweł Orzechowski – Lens – 1973–74
- **Maxi Oyedele** – **Strasbourg** – 2025–
- Maryan Paszko – Saint-Étienne – 1957–58, 1961–62
- Damien Perquis – Saint Etienne, Sochaux – 2005–12
- Mariusz Piekarski – Bastia – 1998–99
- Jan Pietras – FC Nancy – 1947–48
- Łukasz Poręba – Lens – 2022–23
- Maciej Rybus – Lyon – 2016–17
- Marek Saganowski – Troyes – 2006–07
- Zbigniew Seweryn – Tours – 1980–81
- **Michał Skóraś** – **Lens** – 2026–
- Mariusz Stępiński – Nantes – 2016–17
- Krzysztof Surlit – Nîmes Olympique – 1983–84
- Piotr Świerczewski – Saint-Étienne, Bastia, Marseille – 1993–2002
- Andrzej Szarmach – Auxerre – 1980–85
- Józef Szczyrba – Rouen – 1969–70
- Marian Szeja – Metz – 1973–74
- Roman Szewczyk – Sochaux – 1993–95
- **Sebastian Szymański** – **Rennes** – 2025–
- Jan Szymczak – Montpellier – 1947–49
- Ryszard Tarasiewicz – AS Nancy, Lens – 1990–94
- Mirosław Tłokiński – Lens – 1983–85
- Cezary Tobollik – Lens – 1986–89
- Wojciech Tyc – Valenciennes – 1981–82
- Henryk Wieczorek – Auxerre – 1980–82
- Eugeniusz Wieńcierz – Angers – 1980–81
- Tomasz Wieszczycki – Le Havre – 1996–97
- Mateusz Wieteska – Clermont – 2022–24
- Erwin Wilczek – Valenciennes – 1972–73
- Jerzy Wilim – Rennes – 1976–77
- Walter Winkler – Lens – 1974–76
- Piotr Włodarczyk – Auxerre – 2001–02
- Aleksander Wolniak – Valenciennes – 1967–71
- Jan Wraży – Valenciennes – 1975–80
- Marcin Żewłakow – Metz – 2005–06
- Andrzej Zgutczyński – Auxerre – 1986–88
- Jacek Ziober – Montpellier – 1990–93

== Portugal ==
- Manuel Abreu – Paris SG, AS Nancy – 1983–86
- Agostinho – Paris SG – 2001–02
- João Alves – Paris SG – 1979–80
- Paulo Alves – Bastia – 1998–99
- Alexis Araujo – Lorient – 2015–16
- **Fabio Baldé** – **Strasbourg** – 2026–
- Hélder Baptista – Paris SG – 1998–99
- Rui Barros – Monaco, Marseille – 1990–94
- Bruno Basto – Bordeaux, Saint-Étienne – 2000–04, 2005–06
- Beto – Bordeaux – 2005–06
- Pedro Brazão – Nice – 2018–19
- Aurélio Buta – Reims – 2024–25
- Cafú – Lorient, Metz – 2016–18
- Marco Caneira – Bordeaux – 2002–04
- Ricardo Carvalho – Monaco – 2013–16
- Ivan Cavaleiro – Monaco, Lille – 2015–16, 2023–24
- Fernando Chalana – Bordeaux – 1984–87
- Humberto Coelho – Paris SG – 1975–77
- Fábio Coentrão – Monaco – 2015–16
- Mário Coluna – Lyon – 1970–71
- Abdu Conté – Troyes – 2021–23
- Félix Correia – Lille – 2025–27
- Ricardo Costa – Lille – 2009–10
- Costinha – Monaco – 1997–2001
- David Da Costa – Lens – 2020–25
- Victor Da Silva – Monaco, Lille – 1983–84, 1988–92
- Mathys De Carvalho – Lyon – 2025–27
- Pedro De Figuereido – Lille – 1986–88
- Delfim – Marseille – 2001–06
- Gil Dias – Monaco – 2017–18, 2019–20
- Rafaël Dias – Sochaux – 2009–14
- Dimas – Marseille – 2001–02
- Tiago Djaló – Lille – 2019–24
- Eder – Lille – 2015–17
- **Dário Essugo** – **Strasbourg** – 2026–
- Hélder Esteves – Auxerre – 2001–02
- Walter Ferreira – Red Star – 1970–72
- Afonso Figueiredo – Rennes – 2017–18
- José Fonte – Lille – 2018–23
- Rui Fonte – Lille – 2018–19
- Paulo Futre – Marseille – 1993–94
- José Gaspar – Ajaccio – 2004–05
- André Gomes – Lille – 2022–23, 2024–26
- Claude Gonçalves – AC Ajaccio – 2013–14
- Antonio Gouveia – Montpellier – 1999–00
- Tiago Gouveia – Nice – 2025–26
- Gonçalo Guedes – Paris SG – 2016–17
- Raphaël Guerreiro – Lorient – 2013–16
- Hélder – Paris SG – 2004–05
- Tiago Ilori – Bordeaux – 2014–15
- João Paulo – Le Mans – 2009–10
- Jota – Rennes – 2024–25
- Daniel Kenedy – Paris SG – 1996–97
- Hugo Leal – Paris SG – 2001–04
- Rafael Leão – Lille – 2018–19
- Paolo Lebas – Ajaccio – 2022–23
- **Anthony Lopes** – Lyon, Nantes, **Angers** – 2012–
- Miguel Lopes – Lyon – 2013–14
- Rony Lopes – Lille, Monaco, Nice, Troyes – 2014–21, 2022–23
- Rafael Luís – Strasbourg – 2025–26
- Paulo Machado – Saint-Étienne, Toulouse FC – 2008–12
- Ariza Makukula – Nantes – 2002–03
- Ricardo Mangas – Bordeaux – 2021–22
- Afonso Martins – Nancy – 1991–92
- Gelson Martins – Monaco – 2018–23
- Nuno Mendes (1978) – Strasbourg – 2000–01
- **Nuno Mendes (2002)** – **Paris SG** – 2021–
- Pedro Mendes – Rennes, Montpellier – 2015–23
- Eliseo Manuel Mendonca – Rennes – 1966–67
- **Mezian Mesloub** – **Lens** – 2025–
- Tiago Morais – Lille – 2023–24
- Afonso Moreira – Lyon – 2025–26
- João Moutinho – Monaco – 2013–18
- **Flávio Nazinho** – **Monaco** – 2026–
- **João Neves** – **Paris SG** – 2024–
- Oceano – Toulouse FC – 1998–99
- Nélson Oliveira – Rennes – 2013–14
- Sérgio Oliveira – Nantes – 2016–17
- Rui Pataca – Montpellier – 1999–2000, 2001–04
- Pauleta – Bordeaux, Paris SG – 2000–08
- Paulo Sérgio (Paulo Sérgio da Costa) – Bordeaux – 2003–04
- Paulo Sérgio (Paulo Sérgio Rodrigues de Almeida) – Montpellier – 2001–03
- Pedrinho – Lorient – 2011–15
- Danilo Pereira – Paris SG – 2020–24
- Ricardo Pereira – Nice – 2015–17
- Mathias Pereira Lage – Angers, Brest – 2019–25
- Jorge Plácido – RC Paris – 1988–90
- Hélder Postiga – Saint-Étienne – 2005–06
- Gonçalo Ramos – Paris SG – 2023–26
- Pedro Rebocho – Guingamp – 2017–19
- Tiago Ribeiro – Monaco – 2021–22
- Kévin Rodrigues – Toulouse FC – 2011–13
- Rolando – Marseille – 2015–19
- Renato Sanches – Lille, Paris SG – 2019–23
- **Tiago Santos** – **Lille** – 2023–
- **Daniel Semedo** – **Lorient** – 2025–
- Adrien Silva – Monaco – 2019–20
- Bernardo Silva – Monaco – 2014–17
- Mario Silva – Nantes – 2000–01
- Luís Sobrinho – RC Paris – 1989–90
- **Diogo Sousa** – **Strasbourg** – 2026–
- Nuno Tavares – Marseille – 2022–23
- Filipe Teixeira – Paris SG – 2002–03, 2004–05
- Tiago – Lyon – 2005–07
- **Vitinha (Vítor Ferreira)** – **Paris SG** – 2022–
- Vitinha (Vítor Oliveira) – Marseille – 2022–24
- Xeka – Lille, Dijon, Rennes – 2016–23

== References and notes ==
=== Books ===
- Barreaud, Marc (1998). Dictionnaire des footballeurs étrangers du championnat professionnel français (1932–1997). L'Harmattan, Paris. ISBN 2-7384-6608-7.
- Tamás Dénes; Pál Peterdi; Zoltán Rochy; József Selmeci (1999). Kalandozó magyar labdarúgók. ISBN 963-85967-0-8.

=== Club pages ===
- AJ Auxerre former players
- AJ Auxerre former players
- Girondins de Bordeaux former players
- Girondins de Bordeaux former players
- Les ex-Tangos (joueurs), Stade Lavallois former players
- Olympique Lyonnais former players
- Olympique de Marseille former players
- FC Metz former players
- AS Monaco FC former players
- Ils ont porté les couleurs de la Paillade... Montpellier HSC Former players
- AS Nancy former players
- FC Nantes former players
- Paris SG former players
- Red Star Former players
- Red Star former players
- Stade de Reims former players
- Stade Rennais former players
- CO Roubaix-Tourcoing former players
- AS Saint-Étienne former players
- Sporting Toulon Var former players

=== Others ===
- stat2foot
- footballenfrance
- French Clubs' Players in European Cups 1955–1995, RSSSF
- Finnish players abroad, RSSSF
- Italian players abroad, RSSSF
- Romanians who played in foreign championships
- Swiss players in France, RSSSF
- EURO 2008 CONNECTIONS: FRANCE, Stephen Byrne Bristol Rovers official site

=== Notes ===
1. Born in Angola
2. Born in Argentina
3. Born in Brazil
4. Born in Cape Verde
5. Born in the Democratic Republic of Congo (then Zaïre)
6. Born in England
7. Born in France
8. Born in Germany
9. Born in Guinea-Bissau
10. Born in Guinea-Bissau (then Portuguese Guinea)
11. Born in Lithuania (then part of the Soviet Union)
12. Born in Mozambique (then Portuguese Guinea)
13. Born in South Africa
14. Born in Spain
15. Born in Switzerland
16. Capped for the Argentina national under-20 football team
17. Capped for the France national under-21 football team
18. Capped for the France national under-16 football team
19. Capped for the France national under-15 football team
20. Capped for the Germany national under-20 football team
