= 1982–83 European Cup =

European football tournament

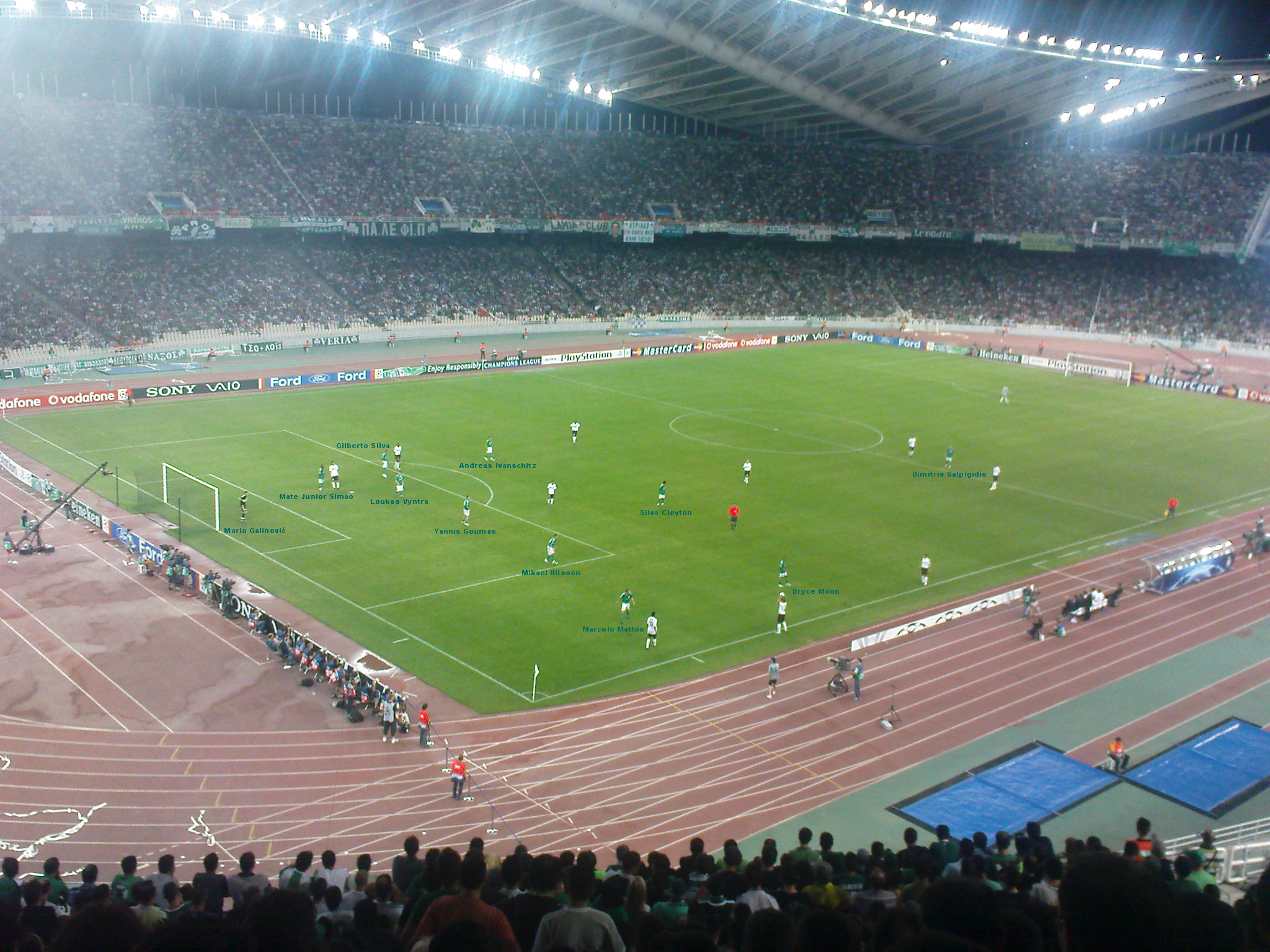
- The Olympic Stadium in Athens hosted the final.

Tournament details
- Dates: 25 August 1982 – 25 May 1983
- Teams: 33

Final positions
- Champions: (West Germany) Hamburg (1st title)
- Runners-up: (Italy) Juventus

Tournament statistics
- Matches played: 61
- Goals scored: 180 (2.95 per match)
- Attendance: 1,812,492 (29,713 per match)
- Top scorer(s): Paolo Rossi (Juventus); 6 goals

The 1982–83 European Cup was the 28th season of the European Cup, UEFA's premier club football competition. The tournament was won for the only time by Hamburg, who beat Juventus 1–0 in the final at Athens' Olympic Stadium. It was the first time since 1976 that the trophy was not won by an English club.

Aston Villa, the defending champions, were eliminated by Juventus in the quarter-finals. Villa's 3–1 first round victory over Beşiktaş was played behind closed doors due to trouble from the Villa crowd against Anderlecht in the previous season's semi-final in Brussels.

Liverpool, the other English side in the tournament, were defeated by Polish champions Widzew Lodz, also in the quarter-finals.

Winning the European Cup allowed them to compete for the European Super Cup in December, when Hamburger SV were beaten over two legs, by the European Cup Winners' Cup in 1983 by Aberdeen FC

== Teams ==
(Albania) 17 Nëntori (1st)	(Austria) Rapid Wien (1st)	(Belgium) Standard Liège (1st)
(Bulgaria) CSKA Sofia (1st)	(Cyprus) Omonia (1st)	(Czechoslovakia) Dukla Prague (1st)
(Denmark) Hvidovre (1st)	(England) Liverpool (1st)	(England) Aston Villa (11th)^{TH}
(Finland) HJK Helsinki (1st)	(France) Monaco (1st)	(East Germany) BFC Dynamo (1st)
(West Germany) Hamburg (1st)	(Greece) Olympiacos (1st)	(Hungary) Rába ETO Győr (1st)
(Iceland) Víkingur (1st)	(Republic of Ireland) Dundalk (1st)	(Italy) Juventus (1st)
(Luxembourg) Avenir Beggen (1st)	(Malta) Hibernians (1st)	(Netherlands) Ajax (1st)
(Northern Ireland) Linfield (1st)	(Norway) Vålerenga (1st)	(Poland) Widzew Łódź (1st)
(Portugal) Sporting CP (1st)	(Romania) Dinamo București (1st)	(Scotland) Celtic (1st)
(Spain) Real Sociedad (1st)	(Sweden) Öster (1st)	(Switzerland) Grasshopper (1st)
(Turkey) Beşiktaş (1st)	(Soviet Union) Dynamo Kyiv (1st)	(Socialist Federal Republic of Yugoslavia) Dinamo Zagreb (1st)

== Preliminary round ==
Team 1	Agg.	Team 2	1st leg	2nd leg
Dinamo București (Romania)	4–3	(Norway) Vålerenga	3–1	1–2

=== First leg ===
25 August 1982

Dinamo București (Romania)	3–1	(Norway) Vålerenga
Augustin 35'; Georgescu 45', 66' (pen.)	Report	Gran 57'

Stadionul 23 August, Bucharest
Attendance: 31,200
Referee: Arsen Hoxha (Albania)

=== Second leg ===
1 September 1982

Vålerenga (Norway)	2–1	(Romania) Dinamo București
Jacobsen 30'; Davidsen 58'	Report	Custov 2'

Ullevaal Stadion, Oslo
Attendance: 3,440
Referee: Osmo Orakangas (Finland)

Dinamo București won 4–3 on aggregate

== Bracket ==
First round
(France) Monaco	0	0	0
(Bulgaria) CSKA Sofia (aet)	0	2	2
(Socialist Federal Republic of Yugoslavia) Dinamo Zagreb	1	0	1
(Portugal) Sporting CP	0	3	3
(Iceland) Víkingur	0	2	2
(Spain) Real Sociedad	1	3	4
(Scotland) Celtic	2	2	4
(Netherlands) Ajax	2	1	3
(Switzerland) Grasshopper	0	0	0
(Soviet Union) Dynamo Kyïv	1	3	4
(Albania) 17 Nëntori (a)	1	1	2
(Northern Ireland) Linfield	0	2	2
(East Germany) BFC Dynamo	1	0	1
(West Germany) Hamburger SV	1	2	3
(Greece) Olympiacos	2	0	2
(Sweden) Öster	0	1	1
(Romania) Dinamo București	2	1	3
(Czechoslovakia) Dukla Praha	0	2	2
(England) Aston Villa	3	0	3
(Turkey) Beşiktaş	1	0	1
(Belgium) Standard Liège	5	0	5
(Hungary) Győri ETO	0	3	3
(Denmark) Hvidovre	1	3	4
(Italy) Juventus	4	3	7
(Luxembourg) Avenir Beggen	0	0	0
(Austria) Rapid Wien	5	8	13
(Malta) Hibernians	1	1	2
(Poland) Widzew Łódź	4	3	7
(Cyprus) Omonia	2	0	2
(Finland) HJK Helsinki	0	3	3
(Republic of Ireland) Dundalk	1	0	1
(England) Liverpool	4	1	5

Second round
(Bulgaria) CSKA Sofia	2	0	2
(Portugal) Sporting CP (a)	2	0	2
(Spain) Real Sociedad	2	1	3
(Scotland) Celtic	0	2	2
(Soviet Union) Dynamo Kyïv	w/o
(Albania) 17 Nëntori
(West Germany) Hamburger SV	1	4	5
(Greece) Olympiacos	0	0	0
(Romania) Dinamo București	0	2	2
(England) Aston Villa	2	4	6
(Belgium) Standard Liège	1	0	1
(Italy) Juventus	1	2	3
(Austria) Rapid Wien	2	3	5
(Poland) Widzew Łódź	1	5	6
(Finland) HJK	1	0	1
(England) Liverpool	0	5	5

Quarter-finals
(Portugal) Sporting CP	1	0	1
(Spain) Real Sociedad	0	2	2
(Soviet Union) Dynamo Kyïv	0	2	2
(West Germany) Hamburger SV	3	1	4
(England) Aston Villa	1	1	2
(Italy) Juventus	2	3	5
(Poland) Widzew Łódź	2	2	4
(England) Liverpool	0	3	3

Semi-finals
(Spain) Real Sociedad	1	1	2
(West Germany) Hamburger SV	1	2	3
(Italy) Juventus	2	2	4
(Poland) Widzew Łódź	0	2	2

Final
(West Germany) Hamburger SV	1
(Italy) Juventus	0

== First round ==
Team 1	Agg.	Team 2	1st leg	2nd leg
Monaco (France)	0–2	(Bulgaria) CSKA Sofia	0–0	0–2 (aet)
Dinamo Zagreb (Socialist Federal Republic of Yugoslavia)	1–3	(Portugal) Sporting CP	1–0	0–3
Víkingur (Iceland)	2–4	(Spain) Real Sociedad	0–1	2–3
Celtic (Scotland)	4–3	(Netherlands) Ajax	2–2	2–1
Grasshopper (Switzerland)	0–4	(Soviet Union) Dynamo Kyiv	0–1	0–3
17 Nëntori (Albania)	2–2 (a)	(Northern Ireland) Linfield	1–0	1–2
BFC Dynamo (East Germany)	1–3	(West Germany) Hamburg	1–1	0–2
Olympiacos (Greece)	2–1	(Sweden) Öster	2–0	0–1
Dinamo București (Romania)	3–2	(Czechoslovakia) Dukla Prague	2–0	1–2
Aston Villa (England)	3–1	(Turkey) Beşiktaş	3–1	0–0
Standard Liège (Belgium)	5–3	(Hungary) Rába ETO Győr	5–0	0–3
Hvidovre (Denmark)	4–7	(Italy) Juventus	1–4	3–3
Avenir Beggen (Luxembourg)	0–13	(Austria) Rapid Wien	0–5	0–8
Hibernians (Malta)	2–7	(Poland) Widzew Łódź	1–4	1–3
Omonia (Cyprus)	2–3	(Finland) HJK Helsinki	2–0	0–3
Dundalk (Republic of Ireland)	1–5	(England) Liverpool	1–4	0–1

=== First leg ===
15 September 1982

BFC Dynamo (East Germany)	1–1	(West Germany) Hamburg
Riediger 17'	Report	Milewski 37'

Friedrich-Ludwig-Jahn-Stadion, East Berlin
Attendance: 22,000
Referee: Jan Keizer (Netherlands)

15 September 1982

Olympiacos (Greece)	2–0	(Sweden) Öster
Anastopoulos 10'; Kokolakis 46'	Report

Olympic Stadium, Athens
Attendance: 71,000
Referee: Paolo Casarin (Italy)

15 September 1982

17 Nëntori (Albania)	1–0	(Northern Ireland) Linfield
Kola 74'	Report

Stadiumi Kombëtar Qemal Stafa, Tirana
Attendance: 19,000
Referee: Evangelos Giannakoudakis (Greece)

15 September 1982
20:00

Grasshopper (Switzerland)	0–1	(Soviet Union) Dynamo Kyiv
	Report	Hermann 84' (o.g.)

Hardturm, Zurich
Attendance: 11,600
Referee: Marcel Bacou (France)

15 September 1982

Dinamo Zagreb (Socialist Federal Republic of Yugoslavia)	1–0	(Portugal) Sporting CP
Cerin 71'	Report

Stadion Maksimir, Zagreb
Attendance: 20,000
Referee: Alek Jarguz (Poland)

15 September 1982

Monaco (France)	0–0	(Bulgaria) CSKA Sofia
	Report

Stade du Ray, Nice
Attendance: 12,147
Referee: Victoriano Sánchez Arminio (Spain)

15 September 1982

Celtic (Scotland)	2–2	(Netherlands) Ajax
Nicholas 15'; McGarvey 28'	Report	Olsen 5'; Lerby 18'

Celtic Park, Glasgow
Attendance: 56,299
Referee: Erik Fredriksson (Sweden)

15 September 1982

Víkingur (Iceland)	0–1	(Spain) Real Sociedad
	Report	Satrústegui 15'

Laugardalsvöllur, Reykjavík
Attendance: 983
Referee: Oliver Donnelly (Northern Ireland)

15 September 1982

Hibernians (Malta)	1–4	(Poland) Widzew Łódź
Xuereb 89'	Report	Tłokiński 7'; Filipczak 33', 63', 66'

Empire Stadium, Gżira
Attendance: 3,497
Referee: Alf Grey (England)

15 September 1982

Avenir Beggen (Luxembourg)	0–5	(Austria) Rapid Wien
	Report	Krankl 20', 26', 52'; Panenka 38'; Willfurth 78'

Stade Josy Barthel, Luxembourg City
Attendance: 1,300
Referee: Egbert Mulder (Netherlands)

15 September 1982

Omonia (Cyprus)	2–0	(Finland) HJK Helsinki
Demetriou 44'; Andreou 87'	Report

Makario Stadium, Nikosia
Attendance: 12,000
Referee: Ivan Yosifov (Bulgaria)

14 September 1982

Dundalk (Republic of Ireland)	1–4	(England) Liverpool
Flanagan 75'	Report	Whelan 7', 26'; Rush 32'; Hodgson 62'

Oriel Park, Dundalk
Attendance: 16,100
Referee: Henning Lund-Sørensen (Denmark)

15 September 1982

Aston Villa (England)	3–1	(Turkey) Beşiktaş
Withe 6'; Morley 9'; Mortimer 29'	Report	Ekşi 61'

Villa Park, Birmingham
Attendance: 150 (Note: Behind closed doors, only officials and reporters allowed)
Referee: Rolf Nyhus (Norway)

15 September 1982

Dinamo București (Romania)	2–0	(Czechoslovakia) Dukla Prague
Mulţescu 30'; Georgescu 59' (pen.)	Report

Stadionul 23 August, Bucharest
Attendance: 39,000
Referee: Károly Palotai (Hungary)

15 September 1982

Standard Liège (Belgium)	5–0	(Hungary) Rába ETO Győr
Tahamata 21'; Daerden 31'; Wendt 49'; Haan 67'; Gerets 86'	Report

Sclessin, Liège
Attendance: 11,000
Referee: Torben Månsson (Denmark)

15 September 1982

Hvidovre (Denmark)	1–4	(Italy) Juventus
Jensen 78'	Report	Platini 44'; Rossi 54'; Brio 60'; Cabrini 73'

Idrætsparken, Copenhagen
Attendance: 30,289
Referee: George Smith (Scotland)

=== Second leg ===
29 September 1982

Hamburg (West Germany)	2–0	(East Germany) BFC Dynamo
Hartwig 33'; Hrubesch 88'	Report

Volksparkstadion, Hamburg
Attendance: 35,000
Referee: Keith Hackett (England)

Hamburg won 3–1 on aggregate

29 September 1982

Öster (Sweden)	1–0	(Greece) Olympiacos
Hallén 80'	Report

Värendsvallen, Växjö
Attendance: 6,399
Referee: Aleksander Suchanek (Poland)

Olympiacos won 2–1 on aggregate

29 September 1982

Linfield (Northern Ireland)	2–1	(Albania) 17 Nëntori
Anderson 79'; Gibson 83'	Report	Minga 28'

Windsor Park, Belfast
Attendance: 4,900
Referee: Roger Schoeters (Belgium)

2–2 on aggregate; 17 Nëntori Tirana won on away goals

29 September 1982
19:00

Dynamo Kyiv (Soviet Union)	3–0	(Switzerland) Grasshopper
Buryak 17', 90'; Demyanenko 36'	Report

Republican Stadium, Kyiv
Attendance: 94,300
Referee: Henk van Ettekoven (Netherlands)

Dynamo Kyiv won 4–0 on aggregate

29 September 1982

Sporting CP (Portugal)	3–0	(Socialist Federal Republic of Yugoslavia) Dinamo Zagreb
António Oliveira 29', 37', 70'	Report

Estádio José Alvalade, Lisbon
Attendance: 45,000
Referee: Alain Delmer (France)

Sporting CP won 3–1 on aggregate

29 September 1982

CSKA Sofia (Bulgaria)	2–0 (a.e.t.)	(France) Monaco
Zdravkov 103' (pen.); Mladenov 112'	Report

Vasil Levski National Stadium, Sofia
Attendance: 35,000
Referee: Gianfranco Menegali (Italy)

CSKA September Flag won 2–0 on aggregate

29 September 1982

Ajax (Netherlands)	1–2	(Scotland) Celtic
Vanenburg 65'	Report	Nicholas 33'; McCluskey 88'

Olympisch Stadion, Amsterdam
Attendance: 52,326
Referee: Luigi Agnolin (Italy)

Celtic won 4–3 on aggregate

29 September 1982

Real Sociedad (Spain)	3–2	(Iceland) Víkingur
Uralde 3', 27'; Satrústegui 54'	Report	Þorvarðarson 1'; Herbertsson 70'

Estadio de Atocha, San Sebastián
Attendance: 16,638
Referee: Charles Scerri (Malta)

Real Sociedad won 4–2 on aggregate

29 September 1982

Widzew Łódź (Poland)	3–1	(Malta) Hibernians
Grębosz 26' (pen.); Matusiak 51', 86'	Report	Xuereb 16'

ŁKS Stadium, Łódź
Attendance: 3,000
Referee: Ștefan Petrescu (Romania)

Widzew Łódź won 7–2 on aggregate

29 September 1982

Rapid Wien (Austria)	8–0	(Luxembourg) Avenir Beggen
Weber 9'; Krankl 20'; Willfurth 21', 54'; Keglevits 34', 77'; Garger 49'; Thill 70' (o.g.)	Report

Gerhard-Hanappi-Stadion, Vienna
Attendance: 9,500
Referee: Damir Matovinović (Yugoslavia)

Rapid Wien won 13–0 on aggregate

29 September 1982

HJK Helsinki (Finland)	3–0	(Cyprus) Omonia
Rasimus 4'; Ismail 61', 79'	Report

Stadikka, Helsinki
Attendance: 1,578
Referee: Reidar Bjørnestad (Norway)

HJK Helsinki won 3–2 on aggregate

28 September 1982

Liverpool (England)	1–0	(Republic of Ireland) Dundalk
Whelan 65'	Report

Anfield, Liverpool
Attendance: 12,021
Referee: Þorvarður Björnsson (Iceland)

Liverpool won 5–1 on aggregate

29 September 1982

Beşiktaş (Turkey)	0–0	(England) Aston Villa
	Report

İnönü Stadyumu, Istanbul
Attendance: 28,654
Referee: Siegfried Kirschen (East Germany)

Aston Villa won 3–1 on aggregate

29 September 1982

Dukla Prague (Czechoslovakia)	2–1 (a.e.t.)	(Romania) Dinamo București
Nehoda 15', 30'	Report	Ţălnar 92'

Stadion Juliska, Prague
Attendance: 4,000
Referee: Anatoli Milchenko (Soviet Union)

Dinamo București won 3–2 on aggregate

29 September 1982

Rába ETO Győr (Hungary)	3–0	(Belgium) Standard Liège
Szentes 38'; Hajszán 57'; Burcsa 68'	Report

Stadion ETO, Győr
Attendance: 23,000
Referee: Panagiotis Tsolakidis (Greece)

Standard Liège won 5–3 on aggregate

29 September 1982

Juventus (Italy)	3–3	(Denmark) Hvidovre
Boniek 34'; Platini 64'; Rossi 84'	Report	Petersen 78', 83'; Hansen 86'

Stadio Comunale, Turin
Attendance: 30,210
Referee: Iordan Zhezhov (Bulgaria)

Juventus won 7–4 on aggregate

== Second round ==
Team 1	Agg.	Team 2	1st leg	2nd leg
CSKA Sofia (Bulgaria)	2–2 (a)	(Portugal) Sporting CP	2–2	0–0
Real Sociedad (Spain)	3–2	(Scotland) Celtic	2–0	1–2
Dynamo Kyiv (Soviet Union)	(w/o)	(Albania) 17 Nëntori	–	–
Hamburg (West Germany)	5–0	(Greece) Olympiacos	1–0	4–0
Dinamo București (Romania)	2–6	(England) Aston Villa	0–2	2–4
Standard Liège (Belgium)	1–3	(Italy) Juventus	1–1	0–2
Rapid Wien (Austria)	5–6	(Poland) Widzew Łódź	2–1	3–5
HJK Helsinki (Finland)	1–5	(England) Liverpool	1–0	0–5

=== First leg ===
20 October 1982

Hamburg (West Germany)	1–0	(Greece) Olympiacos
Von Heesen 56'	Report

Volksparkstadion, Hamburg
Attendance: 17,000
Referee: Roger Schoeters (Belgium)

20 October 1982

CSKA Sofia (Bulgaria)	2–2	(Portugal) Sporting CP
Yonchev 10'; Bogomilov 75'	Report	Fernandes 31'; Xavier 80'

Vasil Levski National Stadium, Sofia
Attendance: 25,000
Referee: Ron Bridges (Wales)

20 October 1982

Real Sociedad (Spain)	2–0	(Scotland) Celtic
Satrústegui 74'; Uralde 79'	Report

Estadio de Atocha, San Sebastián
Attendance: 22,000
Referee: Walter Eschweiler (West Germany)

20 October 1982

Rapid Wien (Austria)	2–1	(Poland) Widzew Łódź
Keglevits 58'; Kienast 71'	Report	Tłokiński 48'

Gerhard-Hanappi-Stadion, Vienna
Attendance: 13,700
Referee: António Garrido (Portugal)

19 October 1982

HJK Helsinki (Finland)	1–0	(England) Liverpool
Ismail 43'	Report

Stadikka, Helsinki
Attendance: 5,722
Referee: Valeriy Butenko (Soviet Union)

20 October 1982

Dinamo București (Romania)	0–2	(England) Aston Villa
	Report	Shaw 11', 17'

Stadionul August 23, Bucharest
Attendance: 37,682
Referee: Emilio Guruceta Muro (Spain)

20 October 1982

Standard Liège (Belgium)	1–1	(Italy) Juventus
Tahamata 68' (pen.)	Report	Tardelli 7'

Sclessin, Liège
Attendance: 44,000
Referee: Michel Vautrot (France)

20 October 1982

Dynamo Kyiv (Soviet Union)	v	(Albania) 17 Nëntori
	Report

17 Nëntori Tirana withdrew, Dynamo Kyiv awarded the victory.

=== Second leg ===
3 November 1982

Olympiacos (Greece)	0–4	(West Germany) Hamburg
	Report	Magath 26'; Hrubesch 51'; Rolff 53'; Bastrup 85'

Olympic Stadium, Athens
Attendance: 75,223
Referee: Brian McGinlay (Scotland)

Hamburg won 5–0 on aggregate

3 November 1982

Sporting CP (Portugal)	0–0	(Bulgaria) CSKA Sofia
	Report

Estádio José Alvalade, Lisbon
Attendance: 40,000
Referee: Jan Keizer (Netherlands)

2–2 on aggregate; Sporting CP won on away goals.

3 November 1982

Celtic (Scotland)	2–1	(Spain) Real Sociedad
MacLeod 30', 89'	Report	Uralde 26'

Celtic Park, Glasgow
Attendance: 54,874
Referee: Alexis Ponnet (Belgium)

Real Sociedad won 3–2 on aggregate

3 November 1982

Widzew Łódź (Poland)	5–3	(Austria) Rapid Wien
Woźniak 15', 25'; Rozborski 29'; Surlit 65'; Wraga 77'	Report	Panenka 33' (pen.); Lainer 53'; Grębosz 88' (o.g.)

ŁKS Stadium, Łódź
Attendance: 16,500
Referee: Henning Lund-Sørensen (Denmark)

Widzew Łódź won 6–5 on aggregate

2 November 1982

Liverpool (England)	5–0	(Finland) HJK Helsinki
Dalglish 27'; Johnston 30'; Neal 44'; Kennedy 61', 73'	Report

Anfield, Liverpool
Attendance: 16,434
Referee: Edwin Borg (Malta)

Liverpool won 5–1 on aggregate

3 November 1982

Aston Villa (England)	4–2	(Romania) Dinamo București
Shaw 5', 52', 67'; Walters 87'	Report	Mulţescu 30'; Iordache 71'

Villa Park, Birmingham
Attendance: 22,244
Referee: Erik Fredriksson (Sweden)

Aston Villa won 6–2 on aggregate

3 November 1982

Juventus (Italy)	2–0	(Belgium) Standard Liège
Rossi 13', 28'	Report

Stadio Comunale, Turin
Attendance: 70,370
Referee: Bruno Galler (Switzerland)

Juventus won 3–1 on aggregate

== Quarter-finals ==
Team 1	Agg.	Team 2	1st leg	2nd leg
Sporting CP (Portugal)	1–2	(Spain) Real Sociedad	1–0	0–2
Dynamo Kyiv (Soviet Union)	2–4	(West Germany) Hamburg	0–3	2–1
Aston Villa (England)	2–5	(Italy) Juventus	1–2	1–3
Widzew Łódź (Poland)	4–3	(England) Liverpool	2–0	2–3

=== First leg ===
2 March 1983
19:00

Dynamo Kyiv (Soviet Union)	0–3	(West Germany) Hamburg
	Report	Bastrup 4', 52', 70'

Vladimir Lenin Stadium, Tbilisi (Note: Dynamo Kyiv played their home match at Vladimir Lenin Stadium, Tbilisi, instead of their regular stadium Republican Stadium, Kyiv, due to weather conditions.)
Attendance: 27,000
Referee: Enzo Barbaresco (Italy)

2 March 1983

Sporting CP (Portugal)	1–0	(Spain) Real Sociedad
Fernandes 89'	Report

Estádio José Alvalade, Lisbon
Attendance: 55,000
Referee: Bob Valentine (Scotland)

2 March 1983

Widzew Łódź (Poland)	2–0	(England) Liverpool
Tłokiński 49'; Wraga 80'	Report

ŁKS Stadium, Łódź
Attendance: 34,000
Referee: Zoran Petrović (Yugoslavia)

2 March 1983
19:30

Aston Villa (England)	1–2	(Italy) Juventus
Cowans 53'	Report	Rossi 1'; Boniek 82'

Villa Park, Birmingham
Attendance: 45,531
Referee: Walter Eschweiler (West Germany)

=== Second leg ===
16 March 1983
20:00

Hamburg (West Germany)	1–2	(Soviet Union) Dynamo Kyiv
Hartwig 61'	Report	Bezsonov 52'; Yevtushenko 82'

Volksparkstadion, Hamburg
Attendance: 50,000
Referee: Rolf Ericsson (Sweden)

Hamburg won 4–2 on aggregate

16 March 1983

Real Sociedad (Spain)	2–0	(Portugal) Sporting CP
Larrañaga 41'; Bakero 68'	Report

Estadio de Atocha, San Sebastián
Attendance: 24,000
Referee: Nicolae Rainea (Romania)

Real Sociedad won 2–1 on aggregate

16 March 1983

Liverpool (England)	3–2	(Poland) Widzew Łódź
Neal 16' (pen.); Rush 80'; Hodgson 90'	Report	Tłokiński 39' (pen.); Smolarek 53'

Anfield, Liverpool
Attendance: 44,949
Referee: Karl-Heinz Tritschler (West Germany)

Widzew Łódź won 4–3 on aggregate

16 March 1983

Juventus (Italy)	3–1	(England) Aston Villa
Platini 14', 68'; Tardelli 27'	Report	Withe 81'

Stadio Comunale, Turin
Attendance: 65,941
Referee: Jan Keizer (Netherlands)

Juventus won 5–2 on aggregate

== Semi-finals ==
Team 1	Agg.	Team 2	1st leg	2nd leg
Real Sociedad (Spain)	2–3	(West Germany) Hamburg	1–1	1–2
Juventus (Italy)	4–2	(Poland) Widzew Łódź	2–0	2–2

=== First leg ===
6 April 1983

Real Sociedad (Spain)	1–1	(West Germany) Hamburg
Gajate 74'	Report	Rolff 58'

Estadio de Atocha, San Sebastián
Attendance: 26,900
Referee: Michel Vautrot (France)

6 April 1983

Juventus (Italy)	2–0	(Poland) Widzew Łódź
Grębosz 8' (o.g.); Bettega 59'	Report

Stadio Comunale, Turin
Attendance: 66,391
Referee: Alexis Ponnet (Belgium)

=== Second leg ===
20 April 1983

Hamburg (West Germany)	2–1	(Spain) Real Sociedad
Jakobs 75' von Heesen 84'	Report	Álvarez 80'

Volksparkstadion, Hamburg
Attendance: 51,000
Referee: Bruno Galler (Switzerland)

Hamburg won 3–2 on aggregate

20 April 1983

Widzew Łódź (Poland)	2–2	(Italy) Juventus
Surlit 54', 81'	Report	Rossi 32'; Platini 82' (pen.)

ŁKS Stadium, Łódź
Attendance: 29,000
Referee: Charles Corver (Netherlands)

Juventus won 4–2 on aggregate

== Final ==
25 May 1983

Hamburg (West Germany)	1–0	(Italy) Juventus
Magath 9'	Report

Olympic Stadium, Athens
Attendance: 73,500
Referee: Nicolae Rainea (Romania)

== Top scorers ==
The top scorers from the 1982–83 European Cup (excluding preliminary round) are as follows:

Rank	Name	Team	Goals
1	(Italy) Paolo Rossi	(Italy) Juventus	6
2	(France) Michel Platini	(Italy) Juventus	5
2	(England) Gary Shaw	(England) Aston Villa	5
4	(Denmark) Lars Bastrup	(Germany) Hamburg	4
4	(Austria) Hans Krankl	(Austria) Rapid Vienna	4
4	(Poland) Mirosław Tłokiński	(Poland) Widzew Łódź	4
4	(Spain) Pedro Uralde	(Spain) Real Sociedad	4
8	(Portugal) António Oliveira	(Portugal) Sporting CP	3
8	(Poland) Marek Filipczak	(Poland) Widzew Łódź	3
8	(Finland) Atik Ismail	(Finland) HJK Helsinki	3
8	(Austria) Christian Keglevits	(Austria) Rapid Vienna	3
8	(Spain) Jesús María Satrústegui	(Spain) Real Sociedad	3
8	(Poland) Krzysztof Surlit	(Poland) Widzew Łódź	3
8	(Republic of Ireland) Ronnie Whelan	(England) Liverpool	3
8	(Austria) Gerald Willfurth	(Austria) Rapid Vienna	3
