= Football records and statistics in Poland =

This page details football records in Poland.

== Team records ==
=== Most top-division championships won ===
As of 2025–26 season

==== Overall ====
- 15 – Legia Warsaw

==== Consecutive ====
- 5 – Górnik Zabrze (1962–63 – 1967–68)

=== Most Polish Cups won ===
==== Overall ====
- 21 – Legia Warsaw

==== Consecutive ====
- 5 – Górnik Zabrze (1967–68 – 1971–72)

=== Most league cups won ===
==== Overall ====
- 2 – Dyskobolia Grodzisk Wielkopolski

==== Consecutive ====
- 2 – Dyskobolia Grodzisk Wielkopolski (2006–07 – 2007–08)

=== Most Super Cups won ===
==== Overall ====
- 7 – Lech Poznań

==== Consecutive ====
- 2 – Amica Wronki (1998 – 1999)

== Most successful clubs overall ==
As of 16 July 2026

Club	Domestic Titles					International Titles			Overall titles
Club	Ekstraklasa	Polish Cup	Polish League Cup	Polish Super Cup	Total	International Soccer League	Intertoto Cup	Total	Overall titles
Legia Warsaw	15	21	1	6	43	-	-	-	43
Górnik Zabrze	14	7	1	1	23	-	1	1	24
Lech Poznań	10	5	-	7	22	-	1	1	23
Wisła Kraków	14	5	1	1	21	-	-	-	21
Ruch Chorzów	13	3	-	-	16	-	1	1	17
Widzew Łódź	4	1	-	1	6	-	1	1	7
Cracovia	5	1	-	1	7	-	-	-	7
Śląsk Wrocław	2	2	1	2	7	-	-	-	7
Polonia Warsaw	2	2	1	1	6	-	-	-	6
Zagłębie Sosnowiec	-	4	-	-	4	1	-	1	5
Raków Częstochowa	1	2	-	2	5	-	-	-	5
Amica Wronki	-	3	-	2	5	-	-	-	5
GKS Katowice	-	3	-	2	5	-	-	-	5
Polonia Bytom	2	-	-	-	2	1	1	2	4
Pogoń Lwów	4	-	-	-	4	-	-	-	4
Jagiellonia Białystok	1	1	-	2	4	-	-	-	4
Arka Gdynia	-	2	-	2	4	-	-	-	4
Lechia Gdańsk	-	2	-	2	4	-	-	-	4
Stal Mielec	2	-	-	-	2	-	1	1	3
ŁKS Łódź	2	1	-	-	3	-	-	-	3
Zagłębie Lubin	2	-	-	1	3	-	-	-	3
Dyskobolia Grodzisk Wielkopolski	-	1	2	-	3	-	-	-	3
Odra Opole	-	-	1	-	1	-	1	1	2
Warta Poznań	2	-	-	-	2	-	-	-	2
Wisła Płock	-	1	-	1	2	-	-	-	2
Zawisza Bydgoszcz	-	1	-	1	2	-	-	-	2
Garbarnia Kraków	1	-	-	-	1	-	-	-	1
Piast Gliwice	1	-	-	-	1	-	-	-	1
Szombierki Bytom	1	-	-	-	1	-	-	-	1
Gwardia Warsaw	-	1	-	-	1	-	-	-	1
Miedź Legnica	-	1	-	-	1	-	-	-	1
Stal Rzeszów	-	1	-	-	1	-	-	-	1
Wawel Kraków	-	-	1	-	1	-	-	-	1

== See also ==
- Football in Poland
- Poland national football team
- Polish Championship in Football
- Polish Cup
- List of football clubs by competitive honours won
