= League Cup in Polish Football =

Former knockout football competition in Polish football

League Cup
- Organiser(s): Polish Football Association (1952–2002); Ekstraklasa SA (2006–09)
- Founded: 1952
- Abolished: 2009
- Region: Poland
- Teams: 12–36
- Qualifier for: UEFA Europa League (1977)
- Related competitions: Rally of Youth Leaders Cup (1952); League Cup (1977–78); Polish League Cup (1999–2002); Ekstraklasa Cup (2006–09)
- Last champions: Śląsk Wrocław (1st title)
- Most championships: Dyskobolia Grodzisk Wielk. (2 titles)
- Broadcaster: Polsat Sport (2006–09)

In Polish football there have been four different League Cups with varying levels of success, but all were short-lived competitions, held irregularly over the years. The league cup competitions focused mainly on top division teams, in contrast to that of the Polish Cup which allows teams much lower down in the footballing pyramid to compete. The four League Cup competitions played in Poland are; the Young Leaders Rally Cup (Polish: Puchar Zlotu Młodych Przodowników) (1952), the League Cup (Polish: Puchar Ligi) (1977–1978), the Polish League Cup (Polish: Puchar Ligi Polskiej) (1999–2002), and the Ekstraklasa Cup (Polish: Puchar Ekstraklasy) (2006–2009), the former three being organised by the Polish Football Association while the most recent competition was organised by Ekstraklasa SA.

League Cups in Poland

- Young Leaders Rally Cup (1952)
- League Cup (1977–1978)
- Polish League Cup (1999–2002)
- Ekstraklasa Cup (2006–2009)

== Young Leaders Rally Cup ==
The Cup of the Rally of Young Leaders was the first League Cup in Poland. The tournament was created by the then president of the Polish Football Association with all 12 teams of the I liga being involved. Due to the league being delayed until after the 1952 Summer Olympics the tournament provided the players a chance to show off their skills with a chance of being called up into the Olympic squad. The tournament structure was 2 groups of 6 who played each other twice. The top team in each group played in the final of the tournament, while the teams that finished 2nd and 3rd in the group played for the third place and fifth placed playoffs. The tournament took its name from the youth rally that was taking place in the city from 20–22 July 1952.

=== 1952 Final ===
20 July 1952

Wawel Kraków	5–2	Cracovia

Polish Army Stadium, Warsaw
Attendance: 50,000

Wawel Kraków won the Young Leaders Rally Cup.

== League Cup ==
The League Cup was introduced as a cup competition due to the rising popularity of football in Poland as a result of the success of the national team and of Polish clubs in European competitions. Journalists from the Polish magazine, "Sport" promoted the idea to the Polish Football Association. The format of the competition was to include all 16 teams in the I liga with 4 groups of 4. The winners of each group would then play in a knockout phase to decide the winner. While the winner of the competition won qualification to the UEFA Europa League.

The League Cup was seen in part as a failure due to the little interest from fans and dwindling attendances. For the second edition the Polish Football Association did not promote the competition, meaning it had to be held independently, and that all the teams in the top division didn't have to take part. In the second edition 5 of the 16 I liga teams refused to take part, leading to the invitation of 4 Hungarian teams and Górnik Zabrze in the II liga.

=== 1977 Final ===
18 June 1977
14:00 BST

Odra Opole	3–1	Widzew Łódź
Andrzej Grębosz 1' (o.g.); Wojciech Tyc 33', 75'		Zdzisław Rozborski 90'

Miejski Stadion, Częstochowa
Attendance: 12,000
Referee: Alojzy Jarguz

Odra Opole won the 1977 League Cup.

=== 1978 Final ===
31 May 1978
14:00 BST

Górnik Zabrze	2–0	Zagłębie Sosnowiec
Janusz Marcinkowski 15'; Józef Kurzeja 27'

Zabrze Stadion, Zabrze
Referee: Dobrosław Stec

Górnik Zabrze won the 1978 League Cup.

== Polish League Cup ==
The Polish League Cup was created due to Zbigniew Boniek and Richard Raczkowski pushing the idea to the Polish Football Association. To try and make the tournament more successful than the previous edition large financial bonuses were used for reaching each round of the competition, with the winners receiving 1.3million PLN in total. The format of the first competition was a knockout tournament with each tie being over two legs, until the final which was a one-off for the cup win. The second edition included teams playing in the II liga, and kept its two-legged knockout rounds, including a two-legged final, this was also the same format used in the third edition. After the third edition the Polish Football Association announced that it would not be organising the tournament for the following season and the competition never returned to the footballing calendar.

=== 2000 Final ===
25 April 2000
19:00 BST

Legia Warsaw	1–2	Polonia Warsaw
Sylwester Czereszewski 38'		Igor Gołaszewski 34'; Przemysław Boldt 90'

Polish Army Stadium, Warsaw
Referee: Andrzej Czyżniewski

Polonia Warsaw won the 1999–2000 Polish League Cup.

=== First-leg ===
26 May 2001
17:00 BST

Zagłębie Lubin	0–3	Wisła Kraków
		Łukasz Sosin 32'; Olgierd Moskalewicz 33'; Ryszard Czerwiec 73'

Stadion Zagłębia Lubin, Lubin
Attendance: 1000
Referee: Grzegorz Gilewski

=== Second-leg ===
3 June 2001
15:30 BST

Wisła Kraków	1–2	Zagłębie Lubin
Tomasz Frankowski 47'		Aleksandr Osipovich 39'; Jarosław Krzyżanowski 53'

Stadion Miejski, Kraków
Attendance: 5000
Referee: Jacek Granat

Wisła Kraków won the 2000–2001 Polish League Cup winning 4–2 on aggregate.

=== First-leg ===
22 May 2002
19:00 BST

Legia Warsaw	3–0	Wisła Kraków
Tomasz Sokołowski 17'; Radosław Wróblewski 67'; Stanko Svitlica 82'

Polish Army Stadium, Warsaw
Attendance: 8000
Referee: Piotr Święs

=== Second-leg ===
26 May 2002
19:30 BST

Wisła Kraków	2–1	Legia Warsaw
Tomasz Frankowski 31'; Kamil Kosowski 52'		Moussa Yahaya 76'

Stadion Miejski, Kraków
Attendance: 7000
Referee: Ryszard Wójcik

Legia Warsaw won the 2001–2002 Polish League Cup winning 4–2 on aggregate.

== Ekstraklasa Cup ==
The Ekstraklasa Cup, organised by Ekstraklasa SA and not the Polish Football association was introduced in 2006. The format was similar to that of the Champions League, with four groups of four and the top two in the groups progressing to a knockout phase. The competition was cancelled in 2009 due to lack of sponsorship and no channel wanting to buy the television rights to games. It was later announced that the teams in the Ekstraklasa voted for the cup competition not to return making it impossible for the Ekstraklasa Cup in its format to return in the future.

=== 2007 Final ===
10 June 2007
12:45 BST

GKS Bełchatów	0–1	Dyskobolia Grodzisk Wielkopolski
Błażej Telichowski 43'

Stadion GKS, Bełchatów

Dyskobolia Grodzisk Wielkopolski won the 2006–2007 Ekstraklasa Cup.

=== 2008 Final ===
17 May 2008
12:45 BST

Legia Warsaw	1–4	Dyskobolia Grodzisk Wielkopolski
Aleksandar Vuković 90'		Piotr Rocki 3'; Jarosław Lato 13'; Adrian Sikora 30', 65'

Dyskobolia Stadium, Grodzisk Wielkopolski

Dyskobolia Grodzisk Wielkopolski won the 2007–2008 Ekstraklasa Cup.

=== 2009 Final ===
13 May 2009
19:00 BST

Odra Wodzisław	0–1	Śląsk Wrocław
		Krzysztof Ulatowski 31'

MOSiR Stadium, Wodzisław Śląski

Śląsk Wrocław won the 2008–2009 Ekstraklasa Cup.

== Finals ==
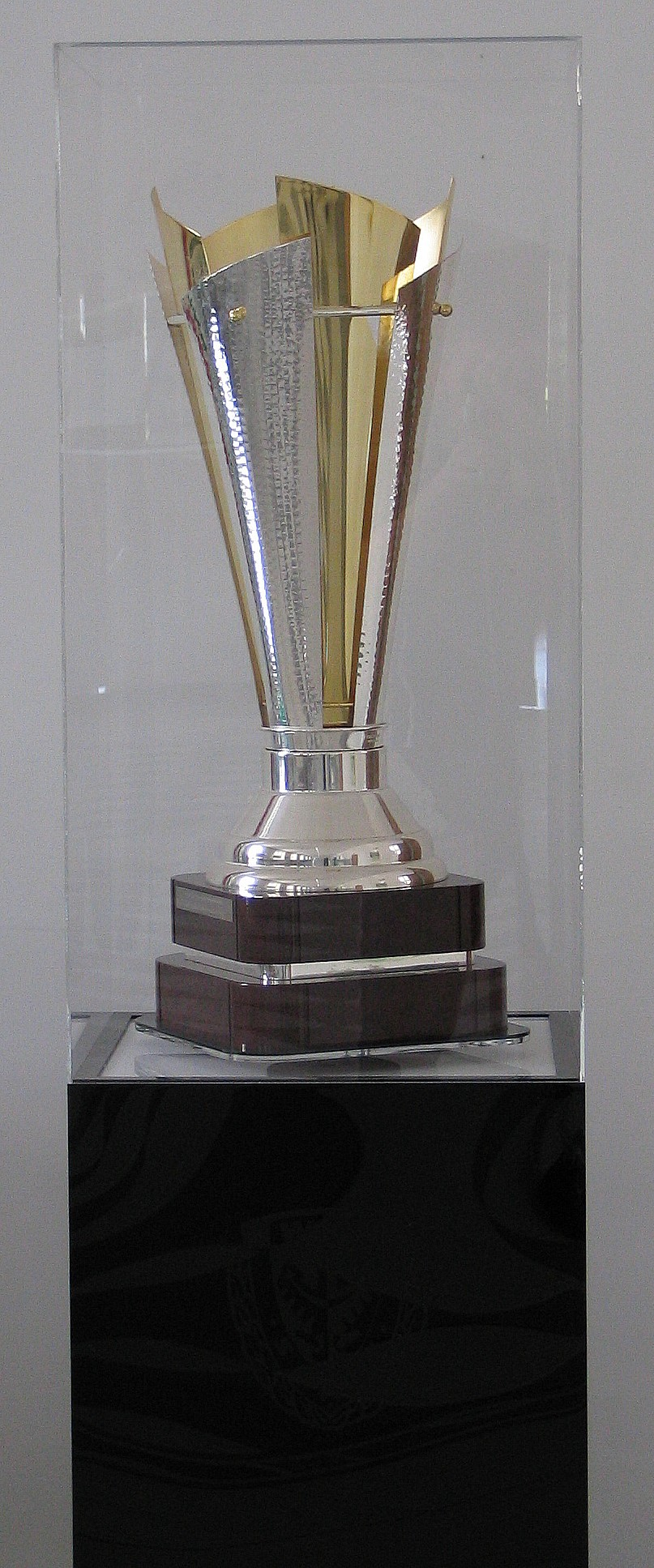
The Ekstraklasa Cup won by Śląsk Wrocław in 2009.

Year	Winner	Score	Runner-up
Young Leaders Rally Cup
1952	Wawel Kraków	5–2	Cracovia
League Cup
1977	Odra Opole	3–1	Widzew Łódź
1978	Górnik Zabrze	2–0	Zagłębie Sosnowiec
Polish League Cup
2000	Polonia Warsaw	2–1	Legia Warsaw
2001	Wisła Kraków	4–2 agg.	Zagłębie Lubin
2002	Legia Warsaw	4–2 agg.	Wisła Kraków
Ekstraklasa Cup
2007	Dyskobolia Grodzisk Wielk.	1–0	GKS Bełchatów
2008	Dyskobolia Grodzisk Wielk.	4–1	Legia Warsaw
2009	Śląsk Wrocław	1–0	Odra Wodzisław

== Future ==
The future of a League Cup competition in Polish football again looks bleak for now. In 2013 the Ekstraklasa introduced championship and relegation groups to conclude the season, leading to 7 additional games for each team in the league. In 2019 the I liga and leagues lower down on the pyramid introduced promotion playoffs, lengthening the season for the teams in the playoffs by at least weeks. Due to the increasing number of fixtures it is unlikely a League Cup will be introduced while the leagues are in their current format.
