= Zbigniew Kwaśniewski =

Polish footballer (1948–2017)

Personal information
- Date of birth: 2 April 1948
- Place of birth: Suwałki, Poland
- Date of death: 29 June 2017 (aged 69)
- Place of death: Bayonne, New Jersey, United States
- Height: 1.78 m (5 ft 10 in)
- Position: Midfielder

Senior career*
Years	Team	Apps	(Gls)
1963–1968	Gwardia Warsaw		
1968–1971	Włókniarz Białystok		
1971–1974	Gwardia Warsaw		
1974–1979	Odra Opole		
1979–1981	Châteauroux		
1982–1983	Odra Opole		

International career
1978	Poland	2	(0)
- * Club domestic league appearances and goals

Zbigniew Kwaśniewski (2 April 1948 – 29 June 2017) was a Polish footballer who played as a midfielder.

He made two appearances for the Poland national team in 1978.

== Honours ==
Odra Opole

- Polish League Cup: 1977
