= Sebastian Janikowski =

Polish-born American football player (born 1978)

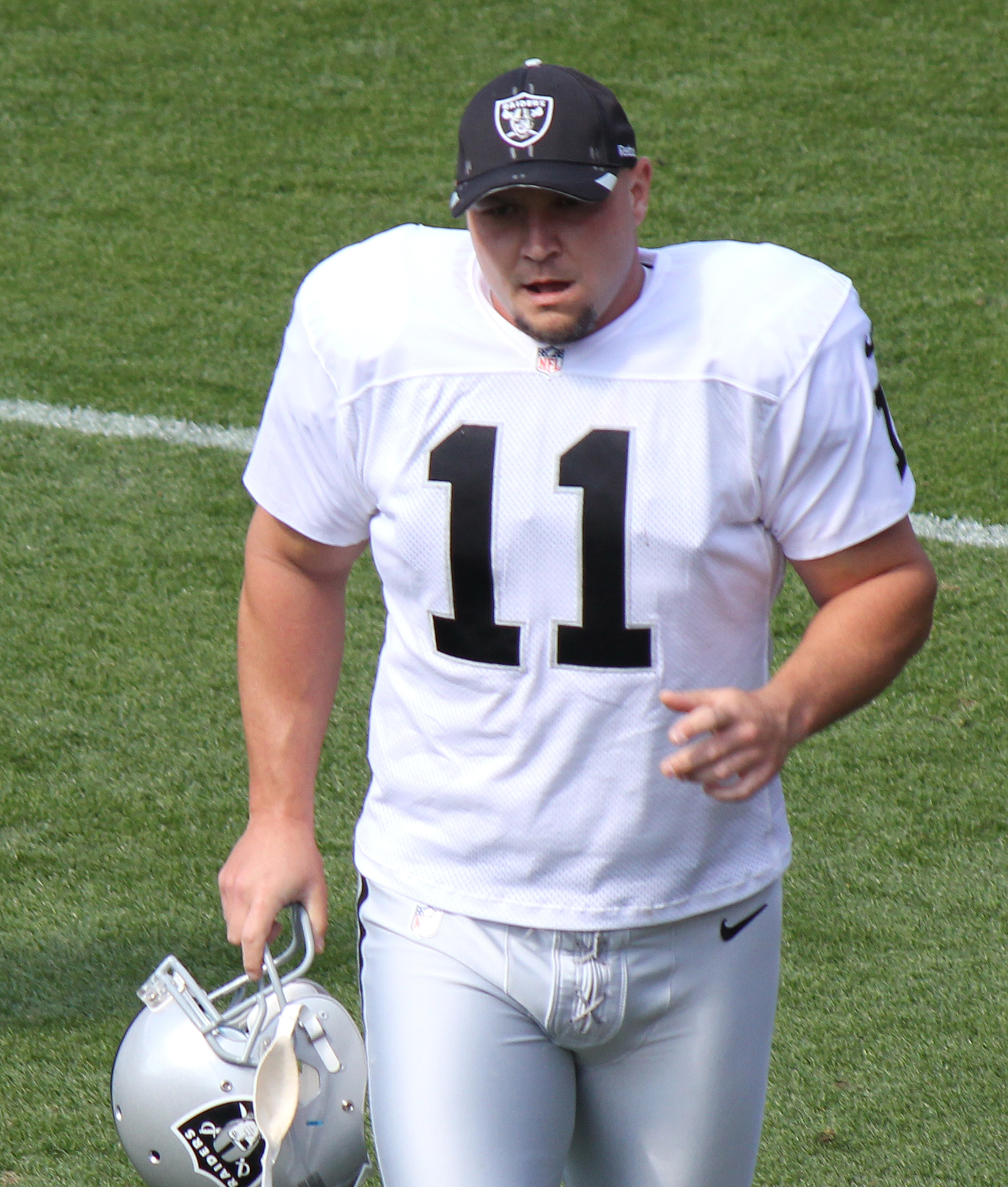
- Janikowski with the Oakland Raiders in 2012

No. 11
- Position: Placekicker

Personal information
- Born: March 2, 1978 (age 48); Wałbrzych, Poland
- Listed height: 6 ft 1 in (1.85 m)
- Listed weight: 260 lb (118 kg)

Career information
- High school: Seabreeze (Daytona Beach, Florida, U.S.)
- College: Florida State (1997–1999)
- NFL draft: 2000: 1st round, 17th overall pick

Career history
- Oakland Raiders (2000–2017); Seattle Seahawks (2018)

Awards and highlights
- Second-team All-Pro (2011); Pro Bowl (2011); BCS national champion (1999); 2× Lou Groza Award (1998, 1999); Unanimous All-American (1999); Consensus All-American (1998); 2× First-team All-ACC (1998, 1999); Second-team All-ACC (1997); First-team AP All-Time All-American (2025); Florida State Seminoles No. 38 honored

Career NFL statistics
- Field goals made: 436
- Field goals attempted: 542
- Field goal percentage: 80.4%
- Longest field goal: 63
- Points scored: 1,913
- Stats at Pro Football Reference

Sebastian Paweł Janikowski (Polish pronunciation: [sɛˈbastjan jaɲiˈkɔfskʲi]; born March 2, 1978) is a Polish former professional American football placekicker who played in the National Football League (NFL) for 19 seasons, primarily with the Oakland Raiders. He played college football for the Florida State Seminoles and was selected 17th overall in the 2000 NFL draft by the Raiders. During his final season, Janikowski played for the Seattle Seahawks.

Janikowski is one of only five NFL kickers to be selected in the first round of an NFL draft and the most recent to be. He is the Raiders' all-time leading scorer and appeared in more games with the franchise than any other player. He was named to the Pro Bowl and All-Pro second team in 2011. He also tied the then-NFL record for the longest successful field goal at 63 yards.

== Early life ==
Sebastian Janikowski was born on March 2, 1978, as an only child to Henryk and Halina Janikowski in Wałbrzych, Poland. His father was a professional soccer player and moved to the United States in the early 1980s in the hopes of reviving his career. Years after Henryk emigrated from Poland, his parents divorced, and Henryk married an American citizen. Left at home with just his mother, Janikowski began to excel at soccer himself, and Janikowski earned a spot on the Polish under-17 team at age 15.

His father's marriage to an American meant that Janikowski could legally emigrate to the United States. He spoke very little English, but learned quickly by taking a three-week night class and by watching television. Janikowski played in only five games for the Orangewood Christian soccer team, but led them to the Class A State Championship game by scoring 15 goals, where they lost to Lakeland Christian on penalty kicks (3–2). Then living in Orlando, Florida with his father and stepmother, Janikowski joined the Orlando Lions, an under-19 soccer club coached by Angelo Rossi. Rossi was also the soccer coach at Seabreeze High School in Daytona Beach, and convinced Henryk that his son would be better off there. Henryk agreed, but was unwilling to move, so Janikowski moved in with Rossi's family.

As a senior at Seabreeze, Janikowski played both soccer and football after being recruited by the school's football coach. As the team's placekicker, he quickly earned a reputation by kicking four field goals of 50+ yards. One of them was for 60 yards, third-best in Florida high school history. During a practice at Seabreeze High, Janikowski kicked an 82-yard field goal. USA Today named him to its 1996 All-American team. After being heavily recruited by some of the top collegiate football programs, Janikowski decided on Florida State University.

== College career ==
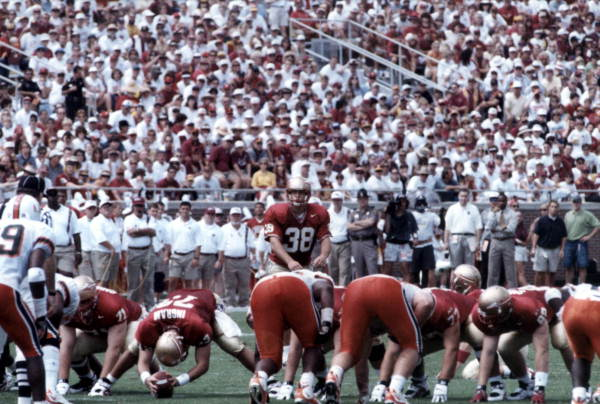
Janikowski lining up for a kick during a game at Doak Campbell Stadium in 1997

Janikowski attended Florida State University, where he played for coach Bobby Bowden's Florida State Seminoles football team. Bowden later said, "Boy, have you ever thought about how many national championships we might have won if we had Janikowski every year of my career?" In three seasons, Janikowski amassed a career scoring total of 324 points (3rd all-time for the school). In 1999, he won the Lou Groza Award for a second consecutive year, an honor given annually to the nation's top collegiate kicker. Janikowski is currently the only player to win this award two years consecutively. He became popular with fans for being able to placekick a kick-off through the endzone uprights, having done it so often that the stadium monitors would display field goal graphics even though it was a kick-off and not an actual field goal attempt.

Janikowski was first called "Seabass" while playing for FSU.

Janikowski's career at FSU was not without incident. In August 1998, he got into a fight outside of a Tallahassee bar and was charged with failure to leave the premises; Janikowski pled no contest to the misdemeanor offense. That same year, the night after a season-ending win over rival Florida, Janikowski got into a fight at a local bar and was charged with battery.

In the 1999 season, FSU was again in contention for a national title. Prior to the team's appearance in the national championship game (the 2000 Sugar Bowl in New Orleans, Louisiana), Janikowski declared his intentions to declare himself eligible for the 2000 NFL draft, saying that his primary reason for foregoing his senior year was to pay for his mother to come to the United States. In his final game for FSU, Janikowski converted 5-of-5 PATs and kicked a 32-yard field goal, helping the Seminoles win their second national championship.

Although Janikowski's skill as a kicker was unquestioned by NFL scouts, his off-the-field behavior was a cause of concern. In January 2000, Janikowski was partying with a group of friends when his high school friend was arrested at a nightclub. Janikowski, who later said that he was thinking he could save everyone paperwork and the trouble, approached the arresting officer and asked how much it would take to let his friend go. He was then arrested for attempting to bribe an officer, a charge that carried a $5,000 fine, up to five years in prison, and possible deportation. Janikowski claimed that he thought he could pay a fine to have his friend released, but the officer interpreted the action as an attempted bribe.

== Professional career ==
Pre-draft measurables
Height	Weight
6 ft 0 7/8 in (1.85 m)	260 lb (118 kg)
Values from NFL Combine

=== Oakland Raiders ===
Janikowski was selected by the Oakland Raiders in the first round (17th overall) of the 2000 NFL draft. In a retrospective about his selection years later, it was said that team owner Al Davis, frustrated at the middling success at the kicker position (the previous season saw them make just one field goal from 50 yards out), wanted to see if he could find a kicker to solve the problem swiftly. While team coach Jon Gruden was stated to have preferred Sylvester Morris or perhaps Shaun Alexander, he went with Davis on the pick for Janikowski, the first pure placekicker to be selected in the first round in the modern era.

==== 2000 season ====
Shortly after the draft, Janikowski was acquitted of his bribery charge. He had testified on his own behalf, stating that he was simply trying to pay his friend's fine (as opposed to bribing the arresting officer). Just eight days after his acquittal, Janikowski and two friends were arrested in Tallahassee on suspicion of felony possession of the drug GHB. Once again, he faced prison time or deportation if convicted, but was acquitted of all charges in April 2001. Janikowski's professional career got off to a rough start: in 2000, only 68.8% of his field goal attempts were successful. Despite the struggles, Janikowski converted all 46 extra point attempts as a rookie.

==== 2001 season ====
In the 2001 season, Janikowski made 82.1% of his field goal attempts.

==== 2002 season ====
In the 2002 season, Janikowski converted all 50 extra point attempts and 26 of 33 field goal attempts. Janikowski reached Super Bowl XXXVII with the Raiders in 2002, and kicked an early field goal in the first quarter. His kick briefly gave the Raiders a 3–0 lead over the Tampa Bay Buccaneers. This would be the Raiders' only lead of the game as they lost 48–21.

==== 2003 season ====
On October 16, 2003, during the second quarter, Janikowski tied the NFL record by completing four field goals in a single quarter. In the 2003 season, he converted 28 of 29 extra point attempts and 22 of 25 field goal attempts.

==== 2004 season ====
In the 2004 season, Janikowski converted 31 of 32 extra point attempts and 25 of 28 field goal attempts. After the 2004 season, Janikowski was given a five-year contract extension reportedly worth $10.5 million. This made him (at the time) the highest paid kicker in NFL history.

==== 2005 season ====
In the 2005 season, Janikowski converted all 30 extra point attempts and 20 of 30 field goal attempts.

==== 2006 season ====
In the 2006 season, Janikowski converted all 16 extra point attempts and 18 of 25 field goal attempts.

==== 2007 season ====
Janikowski and punter Shane Lechler in 2007

On November 4, 2007, Janikowski attempted to kick a 64-yard record field goal before halftime against the Houston Texans on a windless Oakland afternoon in McAfee Coliseum. If successful, the kick would have broken the all-time NFL field goal record of 63 yards. However, it bounced off the right upright and came back out. In the 2007 season, he converted all 28 extra point attempts and 23 of 32 field goal attempts.

==== 2008 season ====
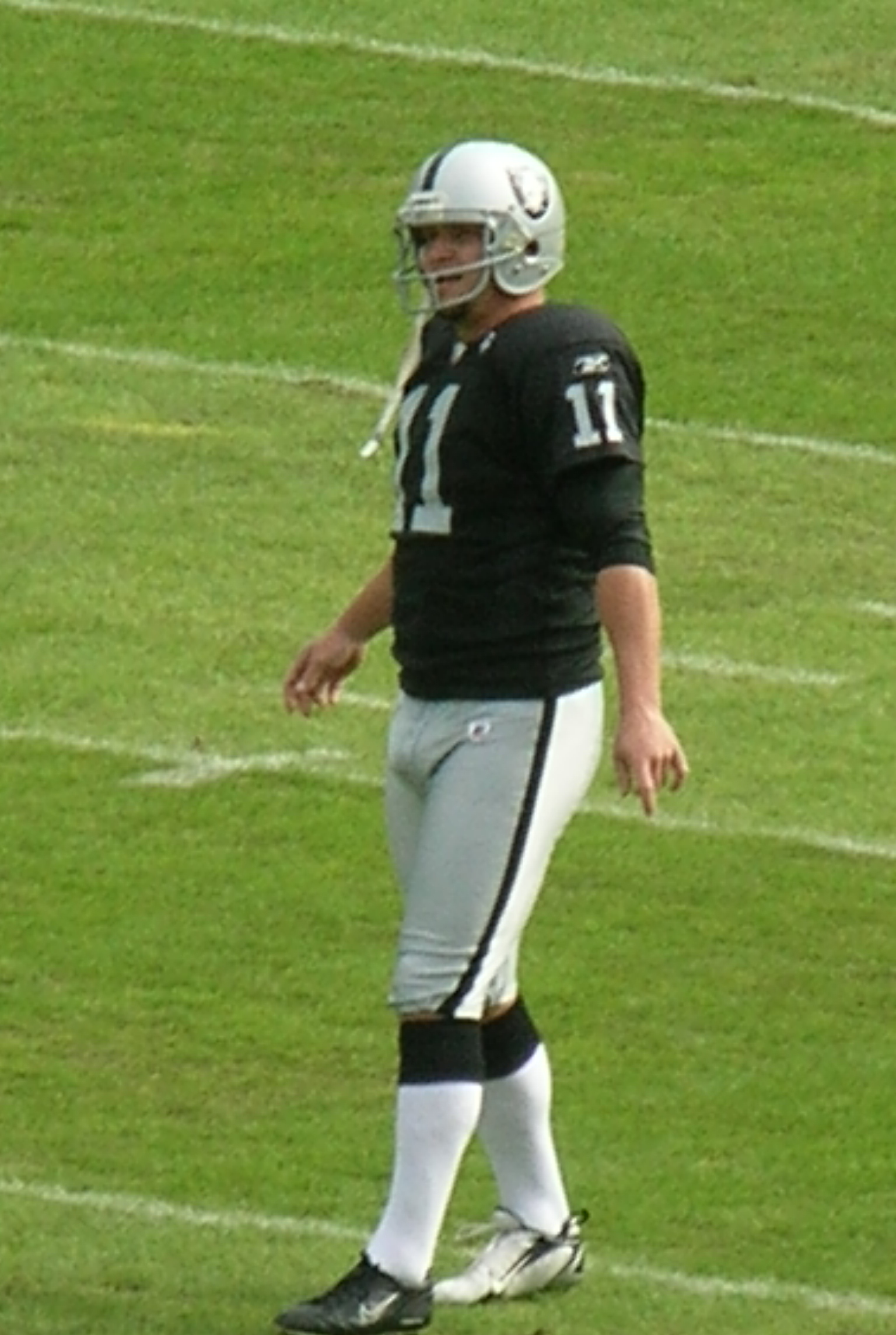
Janikowski kicking a field goal against the Atlanta Falcons, 2008

On September 28, 2008, Janikowski unsuccessfully attempted a 76-yard field goal against the San Diego Chargers into the heavy wind right before halftime. This is presumed to be the longest attempt in NFL history; though the league keeps no such records on attempts, the longest known attempts previous to this were 74 yard attempts by Mark Moseley and Joe Danelo in 1979. On October 19, 2008, Janikowski broke his own Raiders team record, making a 57-yard field goal in overtime to defeat the New York Jets, 16–13, the longest overtime field goal in NFL history. In the 2008 season, he converted 25 of 26 extra point attempts and 24 of 30 field goal attempts.

==== 2009 season ====
On December 27, 2009, he again broke his own team record by kicking a 61-yard field goal against the Cleveland Browns before halftime making him the second player with two 59+ yard field goals (Morten Andersen). On January 3, 2010, he reached his 1,000th career point with a 39-yard field goal against the Baltimore Ravens. In the 2009 season, he converted all 17 extra point attempts and 26 of 29 field goal attempts. In February 2010, Janikowski extended his contract with the Raiders for $16 million over the next four years, including $9 million in guaranteed money, again making him the highest paid placekicker in NFL history.

==== 2010 season ====
In Week 7 of the 2010 season, in a 59–14 win over the Denver Broncos, he converted all eight extra point attempts for a single-game career high. On December 26, 2010, Janikowski converted a 59-yard field goal in the second quarter of a home game against the Indianapolis Colts. In the 2010 season, he converted all 43 extra point attempts and 33 of 41 field goal attempts. His 33 field goal conversions tied for the NFL lead in the 2010 season.

==== 2011 season ====
On September 12, 2011, as a rainy first half against the Denver Broncos came to a close, Janikowski made a 63-yard field goal and tied the NFL record set by Tom Dempsey in 1970 and previously tied by Jason Elam (1998) and afterwards by David Akers (2012), but which was subsequently broken by Matt Prater of the Denver Broncos (64 yards), Justin Tucker of the Baltimore Ravens (67 yards), and Cam Little of the Jacksonville Jaguars (68 yards). On November 27, 2011, in a game against the Chicago Bears, he made 6 field goals of 40, 47, 42, 19, 37, and 44 yards to break the team record of most field goals in a single game. He attempted a record-breaking 65-yard field goal on December 18, 2011, against the Detroit Lions, but Ndamukong Suh blocked it to end the game. In 2011, Janikowski received an invitation to the Pro Bowl and earned second-team All-Pro honors. In the 2011 season, he converted all 36 extra point attempts and 31 of 35 field goal attempts.

==== 2012 season ====
In the 2012 season, he converted all 25 extra point attempts and 31 of 34 field goal attempts.

==== 2013 season ====
In August 2013, Janikowski signed a four-year contract extension with the Raiders for $19 million over five years, including $8 million guaranteed.

In the 2013 season, Janikowski converted all 37 extra point attempts and 21 of 30 field goal attempts.

==== 2014 season ====
In the 2014 season, Janikowski converted all 28 extra point attempts and 19 of 22 field goal attempts.

==== 2015 season ====
In the 2015 season, Janikowski converted 38 of 39 extra point attempts and 21 of 26 field goal attempts.

==== 2016 season ====
In the 2016 season, Janikowski converted 37 of 39 extra point attempts and 29 of 35 field goal attempts. In the Wild Card Round, against the Houston Texans, he played in his first postseason game since Super Bowl XXXVII, almost 14 years later.

==== 2017 season ====
Prior to the 2017 season, he took a pay cut from his $4.05 million base salary to $3 million but it became fully guaranteed. On September 9, 2017, he was placed on injured reserve due to back issues and Giorgio Tavecchio was signed on from the practice squad to temporarily take his place as kicker. On February 14, 2018, it was reported that Janikowski would not be re-signed by the Raiders.

=== Seattle Seahawks ===
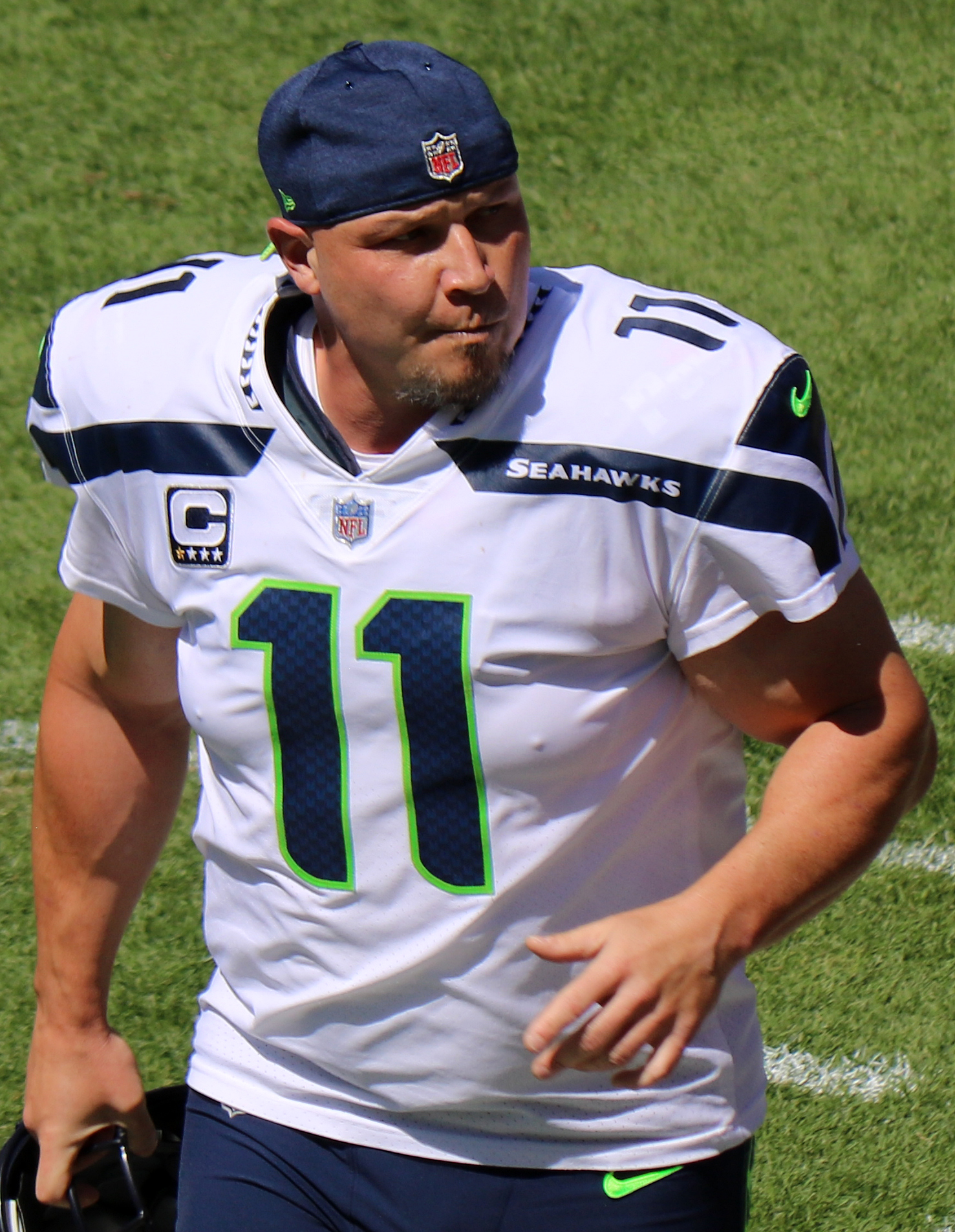
Janikowski with the Seattle Seahawks in 2018

On April 13, 2018, Janikowski signed a one-year contract with the Seattle Seahawks. He won the Seahawks starting kicking job after the team released Jason Myers on August 20.

During Week 12 against the Carolina Panthers, Janikowski made all three extra points and three field goals, including a 31-yard game winner as the Seahawks won 30–27. He was named the NFC Special Teams Player of the Week for his performance. Janikowski finished the 2018 season converting 48 of 51 extra point attempts and 22 of 27 field goal attempts.

On January 5, 2019, Janikowski missed a 57-yard field goal against the Dallas Cowboys during the Wild Card Round and suffered a hamstring injury on the same missed field goal kick. The kicker position was left in the hands of rookie Seahawks punter, Michael Dickson, who missed an onside kick that would have potentially put the Seahawks back in position to score and win the game.

=== Retirement ===
On April 28, 2019, Janikowski announced his retirement after 19 years in the NFL. He ended his career as the Raiders' all-time leading scorer, with 1,799 points.

== NFL career statistics ==
Legend
	Led the league
**Bold**	Career high

=== Regular season ===
Year	Team	GP	Field goals				Extra points (Note: The line of scrimmage for extra point tries moved to the 15-yard line from the two-yard line in 2015.)			Points
Year	Team	GP	FGA	FGM	Lng	Pct	XPA	XPM	Pct	Points
2000	OAK	14	32	22	54	68.8	46	46	**100.0**	112
2001	OAK	15	28	23	52	82.1	42	42	**100.0**	111
2002	OAK	16	33	26	51	78.8	**50**	**50**	**100.0**	128
2003	OAK	16	25	22	55	88.0	29	28	96.6	94
2004	OAK	16	28	25	52	89.3	32	31	96.9	106
2005	OAK	16	30	20	49	66.7	30	30	**100.0**	90
2006	OAK	16	25	18	55	72.0	16	16	**100.0**	70
2007	OAK	16	32	23	54	71.9	28	28	**100.0**	97
2008	OAK	16	30	24	57	80.0	26	25	96.2	97
2009	OAK	16	29	26	61	89.7	17	17	**100.0**	95
2010	OAK	16	**41**	**33**	59	80.5	43	43	**100.0**	**142**
2011	OAK	15	35	31	**63**	88.6	36	36	**100.0**	129
2012	OAK	16	34	31	57	**91.2**	25	25	**100.0**	118
2013	OAK	16	30	21	53	70.0	37	37	**100.0**	100
2014	OAK	16	22	19	57	86.4	28	28	**100.0**	85
2015	OAK	16	26	21	56	80.8	39	38	97.4	101
2016	OAK	16	35	29	56	82.9	39	37	94.9	124
2017	OAK	0	Did not play due to injury							
2018	SEA	16	27	22	56	81.5	**51**	48	94.1	114
Career		284	542	436	63	80.4	614	605	98.5	1,913

=== Postseason ===
Year	Team	GP	Field goals				Extra points (Note: The line of scrimmage for extra point tries moved to the 15-yard line from the two-yard line in 2015.)			Points
Year	Team	GP	FGA	FGM	Lng	Pct	XPA	XPM	Pct	Points
2000	OAK	2	4	3	36	75.0	3	3	**100.0**	12
2001	OAK	2	5	5	**45**	**100.0**	4	4	**100.0**	19
2002	OAK	3	**7**	**6**	43	85.7	**8**	**8**	**100.0**	**26**
2016	OAK	1	0	0	0	0.0	2	2	**100.0**	2
2018	SEA	1	3	2	42	66.7	0	0	0.0	6
Career		9	19	16	45	84.2	17	17	100.0	65

== Records ==
=== NFL records ===
- Most field goals in one quarter: 4 (tied)
- Most extra points in a Pro Bowl: 8
- Longest field goal attempt: 76 yards against the San Diego Chargers on September 28, 2008
