= Polish League Cup (1977–1978) =

- Founded: Spring 1977
- Abolished: Summer 1978
- Region: Poland
- Teams: 16
- Last champions: Górnik Zabrze (1st title)
- Most championships: Odra Opole (1 title); Górnik Zabrze (1 title)

The League Cup (Polish: Puchar Ligi) was a short lived cup competition in Poland spanning two editions in 1977 and 1978.

The League Cup was introduced as a cup competition due to the rising popularity of football in Poland as a result of the success of the national team and of Polish clubs in European competitions. The idea of the cup competition was created by journalists from the Polish sports magazine, "Sport", and persuaded the Polish Football Association to introduce it into the calendar so that it would be an official club competition. The format of the competition was to include all 16 teams in the I liga with 4 groups of 4. The winners of each group would then play in a knockout phase to decide the winner.

== 1977 League Cup ==
The cup started on 27 May 1977 with the final taking place on 18 June 1977. The final took place in Miejski Stadium in Częstochowa. Odra Opole won the cup and qualified for the UEFA Europa League.

Despite the efforts of the league and organisers to promote the cup tournament it proved to be unpopular, mostly due to the fact that the tournament started three days after the league ended and managers opted to mainly play reserve players. The attendances proved to be lower than expected and the players were unhappy their holidays had been shortened by three weeks.

=== Group stage ===
==== Group 1 ====
Pos.	Club	Played	Pts	W	D	L	GF	GA
1	Lech Poznań	3	5	2	1	0	5	0
2	Pogoń Szczecin	3	4	2	0	1	3	3
3	Arka Gdynia	3	3	1	1	1	1	1
4	Śląsk Wrocław	3	0	0	0	3	1	6

Matches

- Arka Gdynia – Lech Poznań 0–0
- Pogoń Szczecin – Śląsk Wrocław 2–1
- Śląsk Wrocław – Arka Gdynia 0–1
- Lech Poznań – Pogoń Szczecin 2–0
- Lech Poznań – Śląsk Wrocław 3–0
- Arka Gdynia – Pogoń Szczecin 0–1

==== Group 2 ====
Pos.	Club	Played	Pts	W	D	L	GF	GA
1	Odra Opole	3	5	2	1	0	7	5
2	Szombierki Bytom	3	4	2	0	1	5	4
3	Ruch Chorzów	3	2	0	2	1	3	4
4	GKS Tychy	3	1	0	1	2	1	3

Matches

- Ruch Chorzów – Odra Opole 3–3
- GKS Tychy – Szombierki Bytom 1–2
- Szombierki Bytom – Ruch Chorzów 1–0
- Odra Opole – GKS Tychy 1–0
- Ruch Chorzów – GKS Tychy 0–0
- Odra Opole – Szombierki Bytom 3–2

==== Group 3 ====
Pos.	Club	Played	Pts	W	D	L	GF	GA
1	Wisła Kraków	3	6	3	0	0	15	4
2	Zagłębie Sosnowiec	3	3	1	1	1	3	7
3	ROW Rybnik	3	2	0	2	1	3	8
4	Górnik Zabrze	3	1	0	1	2	5	7

Matches

- ROW Rybnik – Wisła Kraków 0–5
- Wisła Kraków – Zagłębie Sosnowiec 5–0
- Górnik Zabrze – ROW Rybnik 1–1
- Zagłębie Sosnowiec – Górnik Zabrze 1–0
- Górnik Zabrze – Wisła Kraków 4–5
- Zagłębie Sosnowiec – ROW Rybnik 2–2

==== Group 4 ====
Pos.	Club	Played	Pts	W	D	L	GF	GA
1	Widzew Łódź	3	5	2	1	0	3	1
2	ŁKS Łódź	3	4	1	2	0	4	1
3	Stal Mielec	3	2	0	2	1	1	2
4	Legia Warsaw	3	1	0	1	2	1	5

Matches

- ŁKS Łódź – Legia Warsaw 3–0
- Widzew Łódź – Stal Mielec 1–0
- Legia Warsaw – Widzew Łódź 0–1
- Stal Mielec – ŁKS Łódź 0–0
- Widzew Łódź – ŁKS Łódź 1–1
- Stal Mielec – Legia Warsaw 1–1

==== Semifinal ====
- 12 June 1977: Widzew Łódź – Wisła Kraków 2–1 (1–0)
- 12 June 1977: Odra Opole – Lech Poznań 7–4 AET (3–3 FT, 0–2 HT)

==== Final ====
18 June 1977
14:00 BST

Odra Opole	3–1	Widzew Łódź
Andrzej Grębosz 1' (o.g.); Wojciech Tyc 33', 75'		Zdzisław Rozborski 90'

Miejski Stadion, Częstochowa
Attendance: 12,000
Referee: Alojzy Jarguz

Odra Opole won the 1977 League Cup.

== 1978 League Cup ==
Due to the 1977 competition being seen as a minor failure the Polish Football Association decided not to support the competition, not making this edition of the tournament official in the eyes of the football association. For this edition the 16 I liga teams were again invited, however only 11 agreed to take part in the tournament, leading to the introduction of Diósgyőri VTK, Tatabánya, Szeged LC, and Kaposvári Rákóczi from the Hungarian leagues, as well as Górnik Zabrze from II liga. Due to the tournament not being officially included into the football league's structure, it is difficult to find information other than the final.

=== Final ===
31 May 1978
14:00 BST

Górnik Zabrze	2–0	Zagłębie Sosnowiec
Janusz Marcinkowski 15'; Józef Kurzeja 27'

Zabrze Stadion, Zabrze
Referee: Dobrosław Stec

Górnik Zabrze won the 1978 League Cup.

== Winners and finalists ==
Team	Winners	Runners-up	Winning years
Odra Opole	1	-	1977
Górnik Zabrze	1	-	1978
Widzew Łódź	-	1	-
Zagłębie Sosnowiec	-	1	-

== Aftermath ==
Due to the low attendances and low interest from fans the League Cup was disbanded after its second season. Since the League Cup two more League Cup competitions have been contested in Poland, the Polish League Cup (1999–2002) and the Ekstraklasa Cup (2006–2009) both being taken off the calendar for similar reasons as the League Cup.
