= Grzegorz Kapica =

Polish footballer (born 1959)

Personal information
- Full name: Grzegorz Bronisław Kapica
- Date of birth: 3 July 1959 (age 67)
- Place of birth: Ruda Śląska, Poland
- Height: 1.86 m (6 ft 1 in)
- Position: Striker

Team information
- Current team: Grunwald Ruda Śląska (manager)

Senior career*
Years	Team	Apps	(Gls)
1978–1979	Wawel Wirek		
1979–1980	Grunwald Ruda Śląska		
1981–1983	Szombierki Bytom	68	(31)
1983–1985	Lech Poznań	33	(9)
1985–1989	Ruch Chorzów	27	(4)
1989–1990	Sedan		
1990–1991	STVV		
1991–1992	RFC Tournai		

Managerial career
- 1995–1996: Rymer Niedobczyce
- 1999–2000: Grunwald Ruda Śląska
- 2001: Grunwald Ruda Śląska
- 2001: KS Myszków
- 2001–2002: Janina Libiąż
- 2002–2003: Grunwald Ruda Śląska
- 2003–2004: Polonia Bytom
- 2007–2009: Polonia Słubice
- 2010–2012: Chojniczanka Chojnice
- 2022–: Grunwald Ruda Śląska
- * Club domestic league appearances and goals

Grzegorz Bronisław Kapica (born 3 July 1959) is a Polish professional football manager and former player who played as a striker. He is currently in charge of Grunwald Ruda Śląska.

== Playing career ==
Kapica was the top scorer of the 1981–82 Ekstraklasa with fifteen goals. In 1983, he signed for Polish side Lech Poznań, helping the club win the 1983–84 Polish Cup. In 1985, he signed for Polish side Ruch Chorzów, helping the club win the league.

== Honours ==
Lech Poznań

- Ekstraklasa: 1983–84
- Polish Cup: 1983–84

Ruch Chorzów

- Ekstraklasa: 1988–89

Individual

- Ekstraklasa top scorer: 1981–82
