= 1980–81 Ekstraklasa =

55th season of top-tier football league in Poland

Liga
- Season: 1980–81
- Champions: Widzew Łódź (1st title)
- Relegated: Zawisza Bydgoszcz; Odra Opole
- Matches: 240
- Goals: 549 (2.29 per match)
- Top goalscorer: Krzysztof Adamczyk (18 goals)
- Average attendance: 9,954 ▼10.2%

Statistics of Ekstraklasa in the 1980–81 season.

== Overview ==
It was contested by 16 teams, and Widzew Łódź won the championship.

== League table ==
Pos	Team	Pld	W	D	L	GF	GA	GD	Pts	Qualification or relegation
1	Widzew Łódź (C)	30	14	11	5	39	25	+14	39	Qualification to European Cup first round
2	Wisła Kraków	30	15	7	8	51	30	+21	37	Qualification to UEFA Cup first round
3	Szombierki Bytom	30	15	6	9	51	33	+18	36	Qualification to UEFA Cup first round
4	Śląsk Wrocław	30	13	10	7	32	28	+4	36	
5	Legia Warsaw	30	12	12	6	48	29	+19	36	Qualification to Cup Winners' Cup first round
6	Bałtyk Gdynia	30	14	8	8	30	27	+3	36	
7	Ruch Chorzów	30	11	8	11	36	39	−3	30	
8	Lech Poznań	30	11	7	12	28	29	−1	29	
9	Stal Mielec	30	12	4	14	41	44	−3	28	
10	Motor Lublin	30	10	8	12	36	45	−9	28	
11	Arka Gdynia	30	9	10	11	40	42	−2	28	
12	Górnik Zabrze	30	9	9	12	20	27	−7	27	
13	ŁKS Łódź	30	8	9	13	24	38	−14	25	
14	Zagłębie Sosnowiec	30	7	10	13	22	27	−5	24	
15	Zawisza Bydgoszcz (R)	30	9	5	16	25	43	−18	23	Relegated to II liga
16	Odra Opole (R)	30	6	6	18	26	43	−17	18	Relegated to II liga

Source: 90minut.pl (in Polish)
(C) Champions; (R) Relegated

== Results ==
Home \ Away	ARK	BGD	GÓR	LPO	LEG	ŁKS	MOL	OOP	RUC	STA	SZB	ŚLĄ	WID	WIS	ZSO	ZAW
Arka Gdynia		0–0	0–2	0–1	1–4	3–0	2–1	2–2	1–1	0–2	2–2	0–0	2–0	0–2	4–0	4–1
Bałtyk Gdynia	0–3		1–0	4–2	1–0	1–0	1–0	1–0	1–0	2–1	2–2	0–1	2–0	1–0	1–1	2–2
Górnik Zabrze	2–3	0–1		0–0	1–1	1–0	1–0	2–0	0–0	1–1	1–0	1–0	1–2	1–1	1–0	1–0
Lech Poznań	0–1	1–2	0–0		2–0	0–0	1–1	1–0	2–0	1–2	1–0	3–0	0–0	2–0	0–0	2–0
Legia Warsaw	0–0	1–1	2–1	3–0		3–1	2–3	1–1	4–0	2–0	2–1	4–0	0–0	0–2	2–0	2–1
ŁKS Łódź	1–1	0–0	2–0	2–0	1–2		1–1	0–2	4–2	3–2	3–1	2–2	0–0	1–0	0–0	1–0
Motor Lublin	2–0	1–0	3–0	2–1	0–5	1–0		1–0	0–0	2–3	2–2	1–1	2–2	1–5	1–1	1–0
Odra Opole	2–3	0–1	0–0	1–1	2–2	3–0	3–2		1–3	2–0	0–2	0–1	0–0	0–3	2–1	1–0
Ruch Chorzów	3–1	1–3	1–1	0–1	4–1	2–0	2–0	1–0		4–3	1–0	0–0	1–1	2–1	0–0	2–3
Stal Mielec	2–2	1–0	1–0	1–0	0–0	3–0	1–2	2–0	2–1		1–1	0–2	0–1	5–3	2–1	2–1
Szombierki Bytom	4–1	3–1	2–0	2–1	3–2	2–0	2–1	3–0	3–1	3–2		3–0	1–1	3–1	0–0	2–0
Śląsk Wrocław	2–1	3–0	0–1	1–0	1–1	0–0	1–1	3–2	0–0	2–0	1–0		2–1	1–0	2–1	3–1
Widzew Łódź	2–1	2–0	2–1	3–0	0–0	1–1	2–1	3–1	1–0	3–1	0–2	2–1		1–1	0–0	4–0
Wisła Kraków	1–1	1–1	0–0	3–1	1–1	4–0	3–0	1–0	4–1	2–0	3–2	2–1	3–2		0–0	2–0
Zagłębie Sosnowiec	3–1	1–0	2–0	1–2	0–0	0–1	1–2	1–0	0–1	2–1	1–0	0–0	0–1	1–2		4–0
Zawisza Bydgoszcz	0–0	0–0	2–0	0–2	1–1	1–0	2–1	2–1	1–2	1–0	2–0	1–1	1–2	1–0	1–0	

Source: 90minut.pl (in Polish)
Legend: Blue = home team win; Yellow = draw; Red = away team win.

== Top goalscorers ==
Rank	Player	Club	Goals
1	(Poland) Krzysztof Adamczyk	Legia Warsaw	18
2	(Poland) Kazimierz Kmiecik	Wisła Kraków	16
3	(Poland) Roman Ogaza	Szombierki Bytom	14
4	(Poland) Andrzej Szarmach	Stal Mielec	12
4	(Poland) Henryk Janikowski	Stal Mielec	12
6	(Poland) Andrzej Iwan	Wisła Kraków	11
6	(Poland) Tomasz Korynt	Arka Gdynia	11
6	(Poland) Andrzej Zgutczyński	Bałtyk Gdynia	11
9	(Poland) Krzysztof Surlit	Widzew Łódź	9
9	(Poland) Bogdan Kwapisz	Zawisza Bydgoszcz	9
9	(Poland) Marek Skurczyński	Lech Poznań	9

== Attendances ==
#	Club	Average
1	Zawisza Bydgoszcz	18,667
2	Motor Lublin	18,067
3	Lech Poznań	17,600
4	Widzew Łódź	14,267
5	Legia Warszawa	12,800
6	Wisła Kraków	10,533
7	Śląsk Wrocław	10,333
8	Stal Mielec	9,800
9	Arka Gdynia	8,733
10	Ruch Chorzów	8,033
11	Bałtyk Gdynia	7,267
12	Górnik Zabrze	7,029
13	ŁKS	5,420
14	Szombierki Bytom	5,334
15	Odra Opole	3,500
16	Zagłębie Sosnowiec	1,880
