= Mirosław Tłokiński =

Polish footballer

Personal information
- Date of birth: 2 October 1955 (age 71)
- Place of birth: Gdynia, Poland
- Height: 1.82 m (6 ft 0 in)
- Positions: Forward; utility player

Youth career
- 1969–1973: Flota Gdynia

Senior career*
Years	Team	Apps	(Gls)
1973–1975	Arka Gdynia	25	(3)
1975–1976	Lechia Gdańsk	27	(4)
1976–1983	Widzew Łódź	177	(26)
1983–1985	Lens	62	(14)
1985–1986	CS Chênois	29	(18)
1986–1987	FC Renens	20	(15)
1987–1988	Vevey-Sports 05		
1988–1989	FC Renens		
1989–1990	Lausanne Ouchy		
1990–1993	FC Onex		
1993	Urania Genève Sport		
Total		340	(80)

International career
1981–1983	Poland	2	(0)
- * Club domestic league appearances and goals

Mirosław Tłokiński (born 2 October 1955) is a Polish former professional footballer. He spent the majority of his early years playing in Poland, mainly for Widzew Łódź, before moving to Western Europe and playing for teams in France and Switzerland. During his career he mostly played as a forward, but was a versatile player and played in every outfield position during his career.

== Career ==
Tłokiński started his career in the city of his birth, Gdynia, playing for Arka Gdynia over two seasons. At the age of 20 he joined Arka's bitter rivals Lechia Gdańsk. He was only with Lechia for a season, playing a total of 30 games in all competitions, scoring 4 goals. It was his next move which would see his most successful spell as a player. In 1976, Tłokiński joined Widzew Łódź, where he spent the next seven years of his career. His time at Widzew coincided with the period which was known as their "Golden Generation". Widzew won their first ever Ekstraklasa title in 1981, and won the league for the second time the following season. Despite not winning the league the following season, Tłokiński did finish as the league's highest goalscorer. After his time in Poland, Tłokiński played with Lens in France, and went on to play for one more French team and four Swiss teams, before finally retiring in 1993 at the age of 38.

== Honours ==
Widzew Łódź

- Ekstraklasa: 1980–81, 1981–82

Individual

- Ekstraklasa top scorer: 1982–83
