= Marek Filipczak =

Polish association football player

Personal information
- Date of birth: 15 April 1960 (age 66)
- Place of birth: Warsaw, Poland
- Height: 1.82 m (6 ft 0 in)
- Position: Forward

Youth career
- Reduta Warsaw

Senior career*
Years	Team	Apps	(Gls)
1979–1980	Farmacja Tarchomin		
1981	Polonia Warsaw		
1981–1984	Widzew Łódź	63	(16)
1984–1985	Bałtyk Gdynia	30	(4)
1985–1988	Stal Mielec	54+	(15+)
1988–1989	Olimpia Poznań	40	(11)
1990–1992	Brann	36	(5)
1993	Løv-Ham		
- * Club domestic league appearances and goals

Marek Filipczak (born 15 April 1960) is a Polish former professional footballer who played as a forward.

== Career ==
Filipczak started his career with Polish fourth tier side Farmacja Tarchomin. Before the second half of 1980–81, he signed for Polonia Warszawa in the Polish third tier. In 1981, Filipczak signed for Polish top flight club Widzew Łódź, where he made 63 league appearances and scored 16 goals, helping them win the league. Before the 1990 season, he signed for Brann in Norway.

== Honours ==
Widzew Łódź

- Ekstraklasa: 1981–82
