= Andrzej Grębosz =

Polish footballer

Personal information
- Full name: Andrzej Grębosz
- Date of birth: 26 April 1949 (age 77)
- Place of birth: Złoty Stok, Poland
- Height: 1.82 m (5 ft 11 1/2 in)
- Position: Defender

Youth career
- Unia Złoty Stok
- Unia Tarnów

Senior career*
Years	Team	Apps	(Gls)
1971–1974	ŁKS Łódź	58	(7)
1974–1983	Widzew Łódź	156	(8)
1983–1985	VfB Oldenburg		
1985–1986	Arminia Hannover		

Managerial career
- 1988: Widzew Łódź
- * Club domestic league appearances and goals

Andrzej Grębosz (born 26 April 1949) is a Polish former professional footballer who played as a defender.

== Career ==
Grębosz started his senior career with ŁKS Łódź, then he transferred to Widzew Łódź where he played most of his career, winning one Ekstraklasa title in 1980–81. He played European football with Widzew Łódź, reaching the Semi-finals in the 1982–83 European Cup.

Later on, he played in Germany for VfB Oldenburg and Arminia Hannover until his retirement in 1986.

== Honours ==
Widzew Łódź

- Ekstraklasa: 1980–81
