= Henryk Janikowski =

Polish footballer

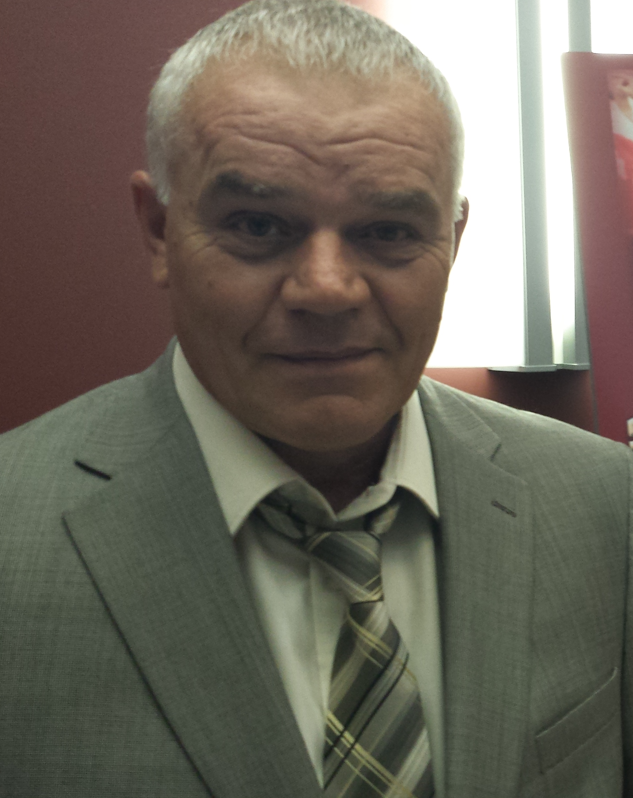

Personal information
- Date of birth: 22 November 1954 (age 71)
- Place of birth: Wałbrzych, Poland
- Height: 1.82 m (6 ft 0 in)
- Position: Forward

Senior career*
Years	Team	Apps	(Gls)
- Górnik Wałbrzych
- Kryształ Stronie Śląskie
1976–1980	Górnik Wałbrzych	72	(21)
1980–1983	Stal Mielec	79	(20)
1983–1984	Cracovia	21	(6)
1984–1985	Górnik Wałbrzych	36	(9)

International career
1981	Poland	3	(2)
- * Club domestic league appearances and goals

Henryk Janikowski (born 22 November 1954) is a Polish former professional footballer who played as a forward.

He made three appearances and scored two goals for the Poland national team in 1981. He is the father to NFL placekicker Sebastian Janikowski.
