= Krzysztof Surlit =

Polish footballer

Personal information
- Date of birth: 13 October 1955
- Place of birth: Zelów, Poland
- Date of death: 23 September 2007 (aged 51)
- Place of death: Szczecin, Poland
- Height: 1.80 m (5 ft 11 in)
- Position(s): Midfielder

Senior career*
Years	Team	Apps	(Gls)
–1973	Włókniarz Zelów		
1973–1975	Widzew Łódź		
1975	Start Łódź		
1975–1977	Zawisza Bydgoszcz		
1977	Start Łódź		
1977–1983	Widzew Łódź	140	(28)
1983–1984	Nîmes Olympique		
1984–1985	USL Dunkerque	25	(2)
1985	Widzew Łódź	11	(2)
1986–1988	GKS Bełchatów		
1990–1991	Oulun Työväen Palloilijat		
- *Club domestic league appearances and goals

Krzysztof Surlit (13 October 1955 – 23 September 2007) was a Polish footballer who played as a midfielder.

== Career ==
Surlit was known for his free-kick ability, which were regarded as one of the best in Polish history. During one match, he told the defensive wall, "You better step back, because I can hurt you" before deliberately hitting the wall which resulted in a goal. With Widzew, he helped eliminate Manchester United from the 1980–81 UEFA Cup with a free kick goal, and scored two goals against Juventus in 1982–83.

After retiring, Surlit became a coach in the Polish lower leagues, but was frustrated that they could not do what was obvious to him.

== Honours ==
Widzew Łódź

- Ekstraklasa: 1980–81, 1981–82
