= 1981–82 Ekstraklasa =

56th season of top-tier football league in Poland

Liga
- Season: 1981–82
- Champions: Widzew Łódź (2nd title)
- Relegated: Arka Gdynia; Motor Lublin
- Matches: 240
- Goals: 533 (2.22 per match)
- Top goalscorer: Grzegorz Kapica (15 goals)
- Average attendance: 9,816 ▼1.4%

Statistics of Ekstraklasa in the 1981–82 season.

== Overview ==
16 teams competed in the 1981–82 season. Widzew Łódź won the championship.

== League table ==
Pos	Team	Pld	W	D	L	GF	GA	GD	Pts	Qualification or relegation
1	Widzew Łódź (C)	30	14	11	5	45	31	+14	39	Qualification to European Cup first round
2	Śląsk Wrocław	30	16	7	7	40	22	+18	39	Qualification to UEFA Cup first round
3	Stal Mielec	30	11	13	6	33	26	+7	35	Qualification to UEFA Cup first round
4	Legia Warsaw	30	11	13	6	39	29	+10	35	
5	Górnik Zabrze	30	13	7	10	35	27	+8	33	
6	Pogoń Szczecin	30	13	7	10	44	43	+1	33	
7	Gwardia Warsaw	30	12	8	10	36	34	+2	32	
8	Wisła Kraków	30	9	11	10	41	32	+9	29	
9	Zagłębie Sosnowiec	30	8	13	9	24	30	−6	29	
10	Szombierki Bytom	30	10	8	12	38	30	+8	28	
11	Lech Poznań	30	11	6	13	25	25	0	28	Qualification to Cup Winners' Cup first round
12	ŁKS Łódź	30	12	4	14	30	39	−9	28	
13	Bałtyk Gdynia	30	9	8	13	24	36	−12	26	
14	Ruch Chorzów	30	9	7	14	29	35	−6	25	
15	Arka Gdynia (R)	30	7	8	15	16	37	−21	22	Relegated to II liga
16	Motor Lublin (R)	30	6	7	17	34	57	−23	19	Relegated to II liga

Source: 90minut.pl (in Polish)
(C) Champions; (R) Relegated

== Results ==
Home \ Away	ARK	BGD	GÓR	GWA	LPO	LEG	ŁKS	MLO	POG	RUC	STA	SZB	ŚLĄ	WID	WIS	ZSO
Arka Gdynia		0–0	0–1	1–1	1–0	1–1	1–0	1–0	1–3	2–2	0–2	3–0	0–1	0–0	0–0	0–1
Bałtyk Gdynia	2–1		1–0	1–0	1–0	0–1	1–2	3–0	0–0	2–0	1–1	0–1	0–0	1–1	2–0	0–0
Górnik Zabrze	1–0	2–0		1–0	2–1	1–1	2–0	4–0	3–1	2–1	0–0	1–0	0–0	4–0	3–0	0–2
Gwardia Warsaw	1–1	2–0	4–2		0–1	0–0	1–1	4–0	2–1	0–1	2–1	2–0	2–0	1–0	2–2	1–0
Lech Poznań	2–0	2–0	0–0	0–1		0–0	2–0	1–0	0–1	2–0	0–1	1–1	0–1	0–1	2–1	1–0
Legia Warsaw	3–0	0–0	1–0	2–2	0–1		4–0	5–2	5–2	1–0	1–1	0–0	0–0	5–3	1–0	2–2
ŁKS Łódź	3–0	2–0	2–1	0–0	1–2	1–0		4–2	1–0	1–1	2–0	1–0	1–0	1–2	0–2	2–1
Motor Lublin	0–1	3–1	0–0	2–1	0–2	3–0	2–0		2–2	1–2	5–1	1–1	0–0	1–3	1–1	4–1
Pogoń Szczecin	1–0	1–2	2–1	3–1	1–1	1–1	4–1	2–1		1–0	3–0	2–1	0–1	1–4	3–2	4–1
Ruch Chorzów	0–1	0–1	1–1	2–1	2–1	0–1	0–1	3–0	1–0		0–2	0–2	3–0	1–1	2–1	4–0
Stal Mielec	3–0	5–2	2–0	0–1	2–2	2–0	1–0	0–0	1–1	1–1		0–0	3–1	1–1	1–0	0–0
Szombierki Bytom	0–1	3–1	2–0	1–2	1–0	2–2	2–0	5–1	0–0	3–0	0–0		4–0	4–0	1–1	2–3
Śląsk Wrocław	4–0	3–1	2–0	3–0	2–0	2–0	3–1	2–1	4–1	2–0	2–0	3–0		1–1	0–1	2–1
Widzew Łódź	2–0	1–1	3–1	0–0	2–0	2–0	3–1	2–1	5–1	0–0	0–0	2–1	2–1		2–0	1–1
Wisła Kraków	3–0	4–0	1–1	6–1	3–1	1–2	1–0	5–1	1–2	1–1	1–1	1–0	0–0	1–1		1–1
Zagłębie Sosnowiec	0–0	1–0	0–1	2–1	0–0	0–0	1–1	0–0	0–0	3–1	0–1	2–1	0–0	1–0	0–0	

Source: 90minut.pl (in Polish)
Legend: Blue = home team win; Yellow = draw; Red = away team win.

== Top goalscorers ==
Rank	Player	Club	Goals
1	(Poland) Grzegorz Kapica	Szombierki Bytom	15
2	(Poland) Andrzej Iwan	Wisła Kraków	14
3	(Poland) Krzystof Baran	Gwardia Warsaw	11
3	(Poland) Zbigniew Stelmasiak	Pogoń Szczecin	11
5	(Poland) Andrzej Buncol	Ruch Chorzów / Legia Warsaw	10
5	(Poland) Marek Filipczak	Widzew Łódź	10
5	(Poland) Wlodzimierz Smolarek	Widzew Łódź	10
5	(Poland) Tadeusz Pawłowski	Śląsk Wrocław	10
5	(Poland) Wlodzimierz Mazur	Zagłębie Sosnowiec	10
5	(Poland) Andrzej Pop	Motor Lublin	10

== Attendances ==
#	Club	Average
1	Pogoń Szczecin	18,267
2	Lech Poznań	16,933
3	Śląsk Wrocław	14,067
4	Motor Lublin	13,667
5	Stal Mielec	12,600
6	Widzew Łódź	12,000
7	Legia Warszawa	11,133
8	Górnik Zabrze	11,133
9	Wisła Kraków	9,433
10	Ruch Chorzów	9,067
11	Arka Gdynia	6,833
12	Bałtyk Gdynia	6,300
13	ŁKS	5,067
14	Zagłębie Sosnowiec	4,433
15	Gwardia Warszawa	4,267
16	Szombierki Bytom	1,853
