= Odra Opole =

Polish association football club

- Full name: OKS Odra Opole; Spółka Akcyjna
- Nicknames: Niebiesko-Czerwoni (The Blue and Reds); Wikingowie Południa (Vikings of the South); Oderka
- Founded: 16 June 1945; 81 years ago
- Ground: Itaka Arena
- Capacity: 11,600
- Chairman: Tomasz Lisiński
- Manager: Piotr Plewnia (caretaker)
- League: I liga
- 2025–26: I liga, 12th of 18
- Website: odraopole.pl
Home colours	Away colours

OKS Odra Opole Spółka Akcyjna (Polish pronunciation: [ˈɔdra ɔˈpɔlɛ]) is a professional football club based in Opole, Poland, currently playing in the I liga.

== History ==
=== Beginnings ===
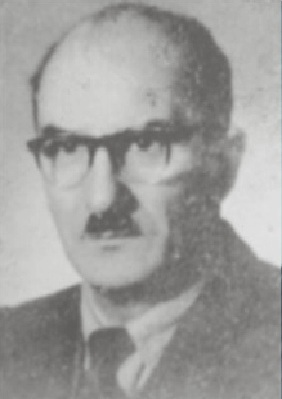
Leonard Olejnik, co-founder and first chairman of Odra Opole

The history of Odra Opole began on 16 June 1945, when in the Opole Town Hall, a group of sports officials gathered to form a new Polish sports organisation. Under first chairman, lawyer Leonard Olejnik, Odra organised first post-WWII sports competition in the city: street running (July 1945). In 1948, Odra merged with Lwowianka Opole and Chrobry Groszowice, and in 1948–1958, the club was called Budowlani Opole. By 1950, Budowlani had several departments, including football, track and field, tennis, boxing, ice hockey and volleyball.

In 1951, managed by Mieczysław Bieniek, Budowlani won promotion to the second tier of Polish football system. In 1952, the team achieved promotion to the Ekstraklasa, after the playoffs with Włókniarz Kraków (3–2, 1–1). The team from Opole debuted in the Polish top league on 15 March 1953, losing 1–2 at home to Gwardia Warsaw (the lone goal for Budowlani was scored by Augustyn Poćwa). After only one year, Budowlani were relegated back to the second division.

In 1955, Budowlani, with its top scorer Engelbert Jarek (who had been purchased from Polonia Nysa), returned to the Ekstraklasa. In the same year, Opole's favourites reached the semi-final of the Polish Cup, losing 0–2 to Lechia Gdańsk. Budowlani, whose name was in 1958 changed back to Odra, remained in the Polish top class until 1958. After relegation, Odra quickly returned to Ekstraklasa, and in the early 1960s, it was among the best football teams of the nation.

=== 1960s and 1970s ===
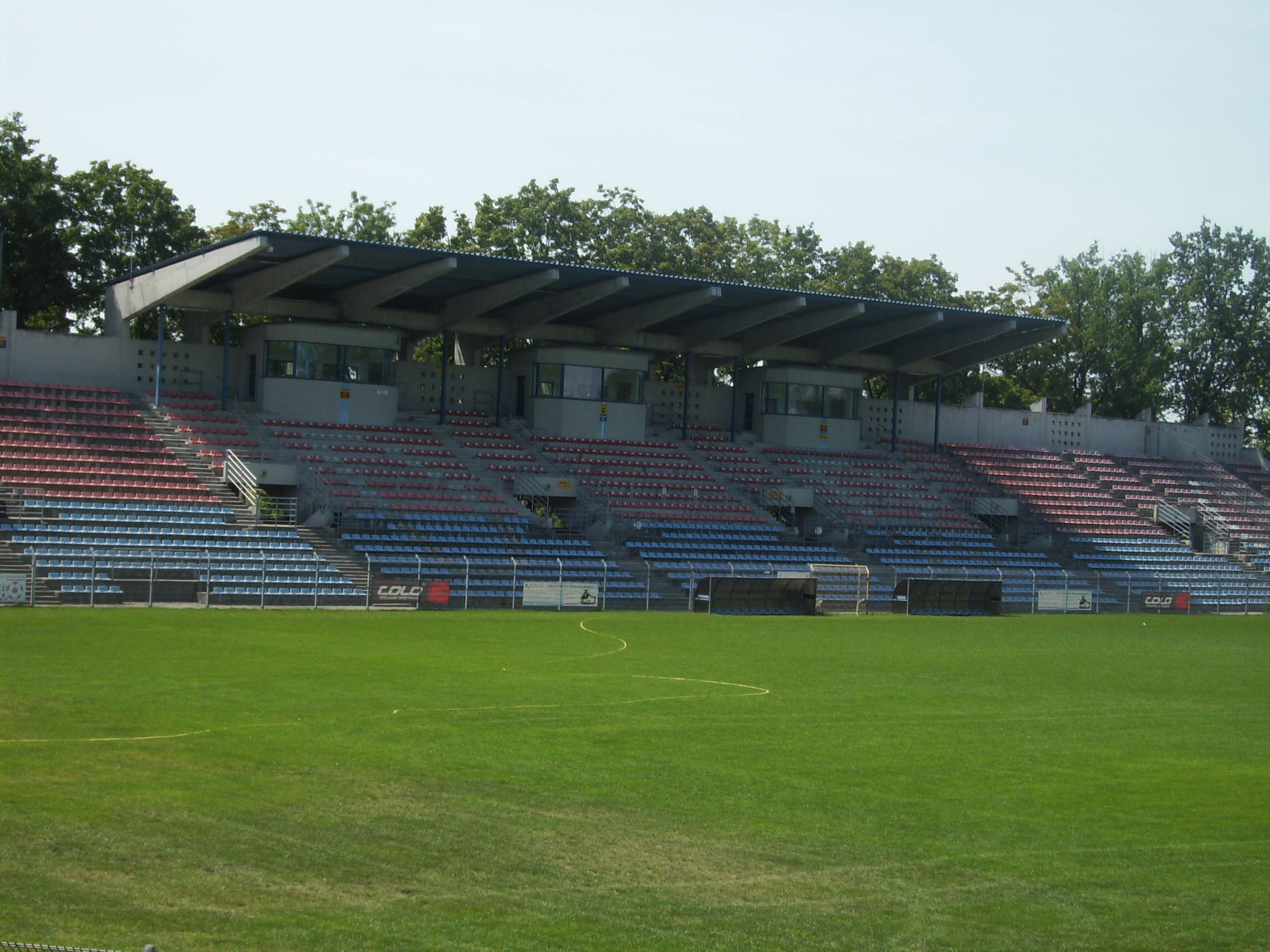
Odra Stadium, which hosted Odra's games until 2024.

In 1960, Odra, featuring several players of the Poland national team, was close to winning the Polish championship. Managed by Teodor Wieczorek, the team lost in the final round to Gwardia Warsaw, eventually finishing the competition in the fourth place. In 1962, Odra won third place in the Polish Cup, after beating Cracovia 3–1.

In the 1963–64 season, Odra was again close to winning the Polish championship. Managed by Artur Woźniak, it finished in the third spot, the best in club's history, qualifying to the Intertoto Cup.

In 1966, Odra was relegated, to return to the Ekstraklasa in 1967. In the early 1970s, Odra, managed by its former star Engelbert Jarek, had several top class players, including Josef Klose and Zbigniew Gut (11 caps for Poland). Nevertheless, in June 1974 the team was relegated.

In 1975, Engelbert Jarek was replaced by Antoni Piechniczek, former manager of BKS Stal Bielsko-Biala. After one year, Piechniczek won promotion back to the Ekstraklasa. Odra's Wojciech Tyc (1 cap for Poland) was the 1975–76 second division top scorer, together with Janusz Kupcewicz of Arka Gdynia. With new generation of talented players, such as Roman Wójcicki and Józef Młynarczyk, on 18 June 1977 Odra won the League Cup, beating 3–1 Polish runners-up Widzew Łódź, earning a spot in the 1977–78 UEFA Cup. There, it lost in the first round to East German side 1. FC Magdeburg (1–2, 1–1).

In the autumn of 1978, Odra was a sensation of the Ekstraklasa. After winning several games, including 5–3 against Legia Warsaw in Warsaw (29 October 1978), and 3–1 against Ruch Chorzów in Opole (19 November 1978), Odra emerged as the autumn round champion. In the spring of 1979 however, Odra lost several important games, eventually finishing the championship in the fifth spot. After this season, Antoni Piechniczek resigned, to be replaced by Józef Zwierzyna.

=== 1980s and 2000s ===
In the 1979–80 season, Odra finished in the ninth spot, and was then relegated at the end of the 1980–81 campaign, not to return to the Ekstraklasa. Odra's last so far game in the top Polish class took place on 14 June 1981 against Legia Warsaw (1–1, goal by Wojciech Tyc). After relegation, Odra remained in the second division, to be relegated to the third level in June 1984. With one exception (1985–86), Odra remained in the third league until June 1997. After promotion, the team finished in the 17th spot in the 1997–98 season of the second division. Odra was not relegated, however, due to a merger with Varta Start Namysłów.

With a new sponsor, Odra was a sensation in the autumn 2000 round of the second division. With 13 wins, three ties and three losses, it was the leader of its group. In the spring of 2001 however, Odra lost several games and finished in the fourth spot. As was later revealed, Odra's successes of autumn 2000 were based on corruption, as games were set up by Ryszard Forbrich, aka Fryzjer. In June 2002, Odra was relegated to the third level, to return to the second division in June 2006, after winning playoffs with Radomiak Radom (1–1, 1–1 and 4–2 in the penalty shootout). In October 2006, for the first time in club's history, a foreigner, Dutchman Guido Vreuls was named Odra's chairman. On 9 January 2008, another Dutchman, Rob Delahaije, became Odra's manager, but his record was very disappointing: four ties and two losses.

In 2009, Odra Opole withdrew from the I liga after becoming insolvent. In June of the same year, a new club by the name of Oderka Opole was established. Oderka applied to be included into the IV liga to which Odra's reserves had won promotion in the previous season. Oderka Opole played in Opolska (Opole) Group of the IV liga, and were promoted to Opolsko-Śląska (Opole-Silesia) Group of the III liga in the 2009–10 season. Oderka renamed her name to traditional one in 2011–12 season and promoted to Zachodnia (West) group of II liga in 2012–13 season. However, Odra's return to third level was brief and relegated again to fourth one due to reducing teams for unifying third level despite finishing as 12th. Odra eventually won promotion to the third tier in 2016, and then back to the second tier in 2017. In the 2021–22 season, Odra qualified to promotion play-offs to the Ekstraklasa, but lost to the eventual winner Korona Kielce.

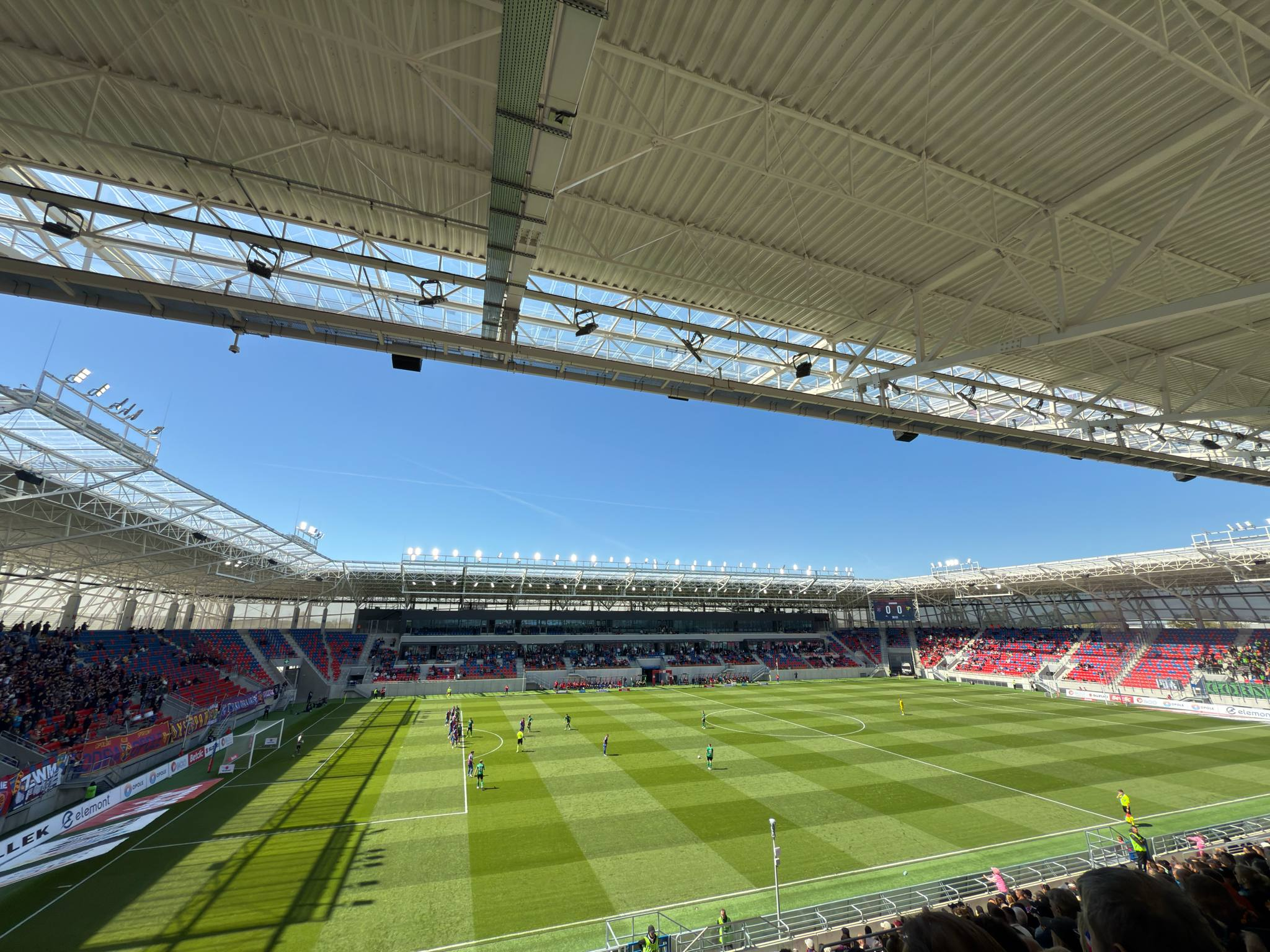
Itaka Arena in 2025

In 2025, Odra's new stadium opened named Itaka Arena with a capacity of 11.600 seats. Odra played their opening match at their new ground against German team 1. FC Magdeburg which ended in a 1–1 draw.

== League participations ==
- Ekstraklasa: 1953, 1956–1958 (3 seasons), 1960–1966 (7 seasons), 1967–1970, 1971–1974, 1976–1981
- I liga: 1951–1952 (2 seasons), 1954–1955 (2 seasons), 1959, 1966–1967, 1970–1971, 1974–1976, 1981–1984, 1985–1986, 1987–1988, 1997–2002, 2006–2009, 2017–
- II liga: 1948–1950 (3 seasons), 1984–1985, 1986–1987, 1988–1997, 2002–2006, 2013–2014, 2016–2017
- III liga: 2010–2013, 2014–2016
- IV liga: 2009–2010

== Recent seasons ==
Year	Division	Position
1999–2000	II liga (II)	8th
2000–01	II liga (II)	4th
2001–02	II liga (II)	18th (relegated)
2002–03	III liga (III)	5th
2003–04	III liga (III)	4th
2004–05	III liga (III)	12th
2005–06	III liga (III)	2nd (promoted ^{1})
2006–07	III liga (III)	10th
2007–08	II liga (II)	13th
2008–09	I liga (II)	17th (relegated)
2009–10	IV liga (V)	1st (promoted)
2010–11	III liga (IV)	5th
2011–12	III liga (IV)	6th
2012–13	III liga (IV)	1st (promoted)
2013–14	II liga (III)	12th (relegated)
2014–15	III liga (IV)	2nd
2015–16	III liga (IV)	1st (promoted)
2016–17	II liga (III)	2nd (promoted)
2017–18	I liga (II)	11th
2018–19	I liga (II)	12th
2019–20	I liga (II)	13th
2020–21	I liga (II)	8th
2021–22	I liga (II)	5th
2022–23	I liga (II)	15th
2023–24	I liga (II)	6th
2024–25	I liga (II)	14th
2025–26	I liga (II)	12th

^{1}: promotion play-off won.

== Honours ==
=== Domestic ===
- Ekstraklasa
  - Third place: 1963–64
- Polish Cup
  - Third place: 1961–62
  - Semi-finalists: 1954–55, 1961–62, 1966–67, 1980–81, 2000–01
- Polish League Cup
  - Winners: 1977
- Youth teams
  - Polish U-19 Championship
    - Champions: 1972
    - Runners-up: 1968, 1976, 1981
    - Third place: 1984

=== International participations ===
- 1961–62 Intertoto Cup:
  - Group stage: Slovan Bratislava 1–1, 1–8, Wiener AC 1–4, 2–0, Vorwärts Berlin 1–2, 2–1
- 1963–64 Intertoto Cup:
  - Group stage: Hajduk Split 0–1, 1–0, FSV Zwickau 1–0, 1–1, HC Kladno 1–1, 4–0.
  - 1/8 final: Norrköping 3–2, 2–0
  - Quarter-final: Slovan Bratislava 0–0, 1–1
  - Semi-final: Polonia Bytom 1–2, 0–0
- 1964–65 Intertoto Cup:
  - Group stage: Spartak Pleven 1–0, 1–1, Tatran Prešov 1–1, 1–2, FC Karl-Marx-Stadt 1–2, 2–0
- 1968 Intertoto Cup:
  - Group stage: Jednota Trencin 0–0, 2–0, 1. FC Magdeburg 2–0, 1–0, Hvidovre IF 1–2, 2–0
- 1968 Intertoto Cup:
  - Group stage: FC La Chaux-de-Fonds 2–3, 3–0, SK Beveren-Waas 0–0, 2–0, Boldklubben 1913 2–0, 2–1
- 1972 Intertoto Cup:
  - Group stage: Boldklubben Frem 1–2, 4–0, Rot-Weiß Oberhausen 0–1, 4–3, SK Voest Linz 2–0, 0–2
- 1977–78 UEFA Cup: 1. FC Magdeburg 1–2, 1–1

== Club records ==
- First game in the Ekstraklasa: 15 March 1953, Budowlani Opole – Gwardia Warsaw 1–2 (0–0),
- First point in the Ekstraklasa: 19 April 1953, Budowlani Opole – Górnik Radlin 1–1 (1–1),
- First Ekstraklasa victory: 7 June 1953, Budowlani Opole – Legia Warsaw 3–2 (2–1),
- Highest win margin in the Ekstraklasa: 8 September 1961, Odra Opole – Lechia Gdańsk 9–2 (5–0),
- Highest loss margin in the Ekstraklasa: 19 August 1964, Polonia Bytom – Odra Opole 7–0 (5–0),
- Longest winning streak in the Ekstraklasa: 7 victories, 1979,
- Highest win margin in an official game: III liga, 1984–85, Odra Opole – WKS Wieluń 13–0 (5–0)

== Players ==
=== Current squad ===
As of 23 September 2026

Note: Flags indicate national team as defined under FIFA eligibility rules; some limited exceptions apply. Players may hold more than one non-FIFA nationality.

No.	Pos.	Nation	Player
1	GK	POL	Miłosz Mleczko
3	DF	CZE	Jiří Piroch (captain)
5	MF	POL	Franciszek Franczak
6	DF	POL	Jakub Pochcioł
7	DF	CRO	Mato Miloš
8	MF	FRA	Mathieu Scalet
9	FW	POL	Michał Feliks
10	MF	POL	Bartłomiej Barański (on loan from Lech Poznań)
11	MF	ESA	Joshua Pérez
14	MF	POL	Tomasz Gajda
16	MF	CRO	Adrian Liber
17	MF	SVK	Branislav Spáčil
19	FW	POL	Kacper Przybyłko

No.	Pos.	Nation	Player
20	MF	POL	Patryk Szysz
22	DF	POL	Mateusz Spychała
23	DF	POL	Bartosz Biedrzycki (on loan from Cracovia)
25	DF	POL	Krystian Palacz
30	GK	POL	Artur Haluch
33	MF	POL	Filip Kupczyk
35	DF	MNE	Nemanja Mijušković
52	DF	BRA	Cássio
55	DF	POL	Maksymilian Pingot (on loan from Górnik Zabrze)
73	MF	POL	Marcin Staś
77	FW	POL	Stanisław Gieroba
96	GK	POL	Kacper Jureczko
—	MF	POL	Michał Nalepa

=== Out on loan ===
Note: Flags indicate national team as defined under FIFA eligibility rules; some limited exceptions apply. Players may hold more than one non-FIFA nationality.

No.	Pos.	Nation	Player
18	MF	POL	Szymon Mida (at Resovia until 30 June 2027)
47	DF	POL	Marcel Białowąs (at KSZO 1929 Ostrowiec Świętokrzyski until 30 June 2027)

No.	Pos.	Nation	Player
—	GK	POL	Adam Wójcik (at Sokół Kleczew until 30 June 2027)

=== Notable former players ===
Had international caps for the Poland national team while playing for Odra.

- Józef Adamiec, one cap
- Bernard Blaut, one cap
- Henryk Brejza, nine caps
- Engelbert Jarek, three caps, one goal
- Norbert Gajda, seven caps, two goals
- Zbigniew Gut, eleven caps
- Konrad Kornek, fifteen caps
- Antoni Kot, one cap
- Zbigniew Kwaśniewski, two caps
- Bohdan Masztaler, ten caps
- Józef Młynarczyk, five caps
- Henryk Szczepański, 28 caps
- Wojciech Tyc, one cap
- Roman Wójcicki, eleven caps
