= Wojciech Tyc =

Polish footballer

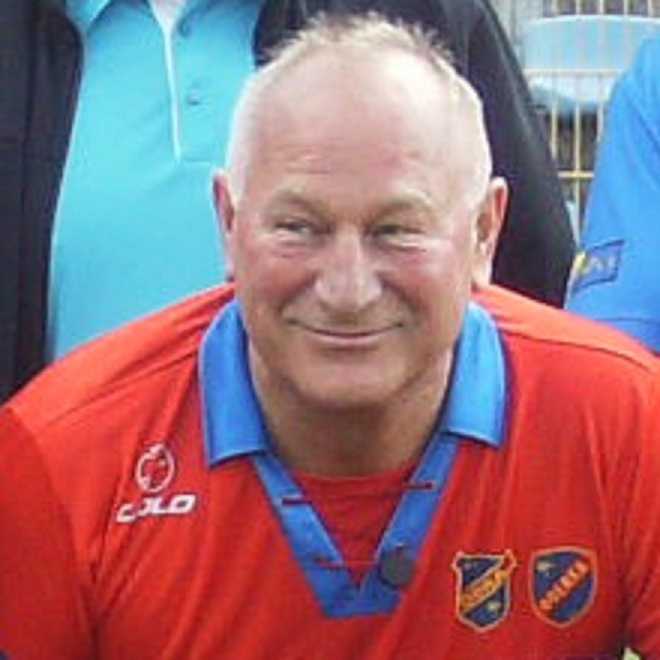

Personal information
- Full name: Wojciech Łukasz Tyc
- Date of birth: 15 July 1950 (age 76)
- Place of birth: Milówka, Poland
- Height: 1.76 m (5 ft 9 in)
- Position: Striker

Senior career*
Years	Team	Apps	(Gls)
1965–1967	LZS Milówka		
1967–1971	Unia Oświęcim		
1971–1972	Niwka Sosnowiec		
1973–1981	Odra Opole		
1981–1982	Valenciennes	22	(5)
1982–1983	Amiens		

International career
1977	Poland	1	(0)

Managerial career
- 1988–1991: Odra Opole
- * Club domestic league appearances and goals

Wojciech Tyc (born 15 July 1955) is a Polish former professional footballer who played as a striker. He earned one cap for the Poland national team.

== Honours ==
Odra Opole

- II liga South: 1975–76

== Sources ==
- Barreaud, Marc (1998). Dictionnaire des footballeurs étrangers du championnat professionnel français (1932-1997). L'Harmattan, Paris. ISBN 2-7384-6608-7.
- Wojciech Tyc at WorldFootball.net
