= Friedrich Scherfke =

Polish footballer

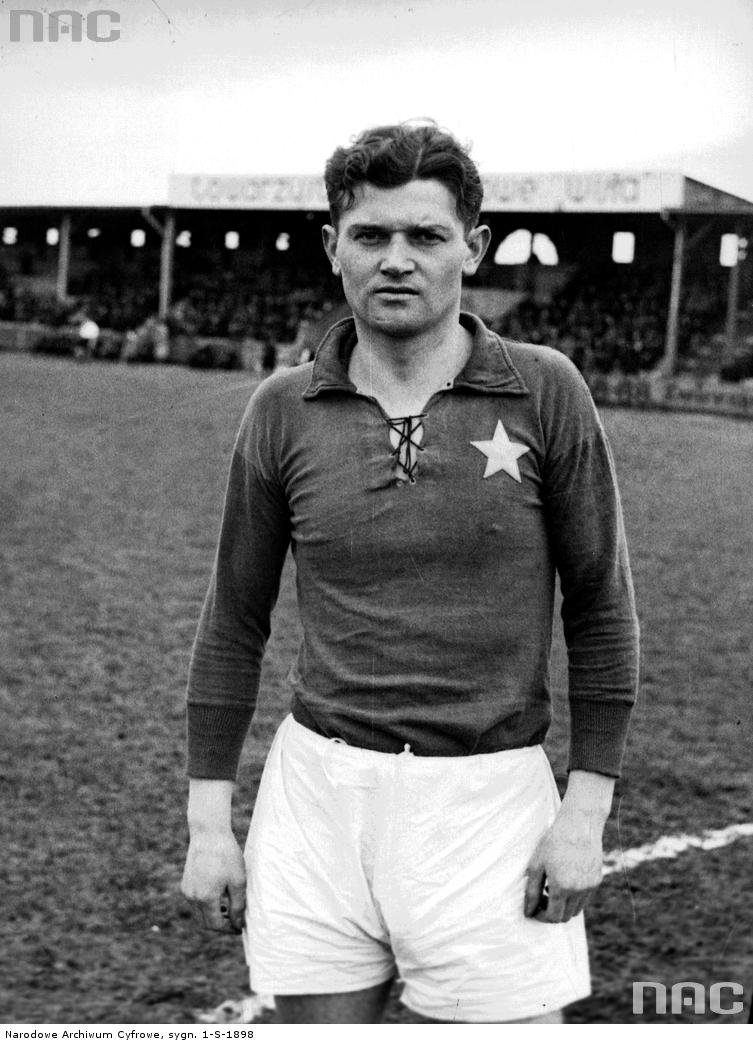

Personal information
- Full name: Friedrich Egon Scherfke
- Date of birth: 7 September 1909
- Place of birth: Poznań, German Empire
- Date of death: 15 September 1983 (aged 74)
- Place of death: Bad Soden, West Germany
- Height: 1.82 m (6 ft 0 in)
- Position: Forward

Senior career*
Years	Team	Apps	(Gls)
- Unia Poznań
1925–1939	Warta Poznań	236	(131)
1940	1. FC Posen		
1941–1942	SG SS Posen		

International career
1932–1938	Poland	12	(2)
- * Club domestic league appearances and goals

Friedrich Egon (Fritz) Scherfke, (Polish: Fryderyk Egon Scherfke or Szerfke; 7 September 1909 – 15 September 1983) was a footballer who played as a forward. An ethnic German, he represented the Poland national team. He is still one of the all time leading goalscorers of all time in the top Polish division with 131 goals.

== Biography ==
Scherfke's native city in the Provinz Posen saw a Polish uprising in late 1918, and by the Treaty of Versailles became officially part of the Second Polish Republic in 1920 when he was 10. He spent most of his career in Warta Poznań, which was one of the best teams in Poland in the 1920s and 1930s, winning the league in 1929 and finishing second in 1928 and 1938. Scherfke also played 12 games for the Polish national team, scoring two goals. His debut came on 2 October 1932 in a 2–1 win against Latvia. He participated in the 1936 Olympic Games in Berlin, where Poland finished fourth, playing in a 3–0 win over Hungary and a 5–4 victory over Great Britain, suffering an injury in the latter match which ruled him out of the remainder of the tournament. On 5 June 1938, he scored Poland's first-ever goal in the history of their FIFA World Cup participation, converting a penalty kick in the 23rd minute of a 5–6 loss to Brazil at the 1938 FIFA World Cup.

During the Second World War, as a Volksdeutscher (ethnic German), he was called up to the Wehrmacht. In February 1940, he became director of the football section in the administration of the new region Reichsgau Wartheland. After two months, he was replaced by an officer of the Wehrmacht. Also in February 1940 he became president and captain of the new German club 1. FC Posen. In this position, he managed to protect some former teammates from persecution by the Nazis. Among those Poles he helped were goalkeeper of Warta, Marian Fontowicz (captured by Wehrmacht during the Polish September Campaign), wife of Zbigniew Szulc, another Warta's goalie (German authorities planned to send her to Germany as OST-Arbeiter), Warta's forward Bolesław Gendera (arrested for playing football), and Michał Flieger, with whom he won the national title in 1929.

When the 1. FC Posen came under the control of the Luftwaffe and changed its name to Luftwaffen Sportverein Posen in October 1940, Scherfke left the club and ended his career as football player at the age of 31. In 1942, he informed his Polish friends that he could not help them any more, he felt himself observed by the Gestapo. In 1943, he was commanded to the Eastern Front, and later to Yugoslavia. Wounded in January 1945 in Yugoslavia, at the end of the war he was captured as POW by British soldiers. He was released on 25 July 1945 and found a new home in West Berlin, where he opened a furniture store. In early 1980s, he sold the store and moved to Eschborn near Frankfurt am Main. Scherfke died in the hospital of Bad Soden in the region of Frankfurt.

== Honours ==
Warta Poznań

- Ekstraklasa: 1929
