= Witold Przykucki =

Polish footballer

Personal information
- Date of birth: 4 March 1907
- Place of birth: Poznań, German Empire
- Date of death: 14 May 1940 (aged 33)
- Place of death: Poznań, Poland
- Position: Forward

Senior career*
Years	Team	Apps	(Gls)
1924–1935	Warta Poznań	184	

International career
1928	Poland	1	(0)
- * Club domestic league appearances and goals

Witold Przykucki (4 March 1907 – 14 May 1940) was a Polish footballer who played as a midfielder.

He made one appearance for the Poland national team in 1928.

== Honours ==
Warta Poznań

- Ekstraklasa: 1929
