= Adam Knioła =

Polish footballer (1911–1942)

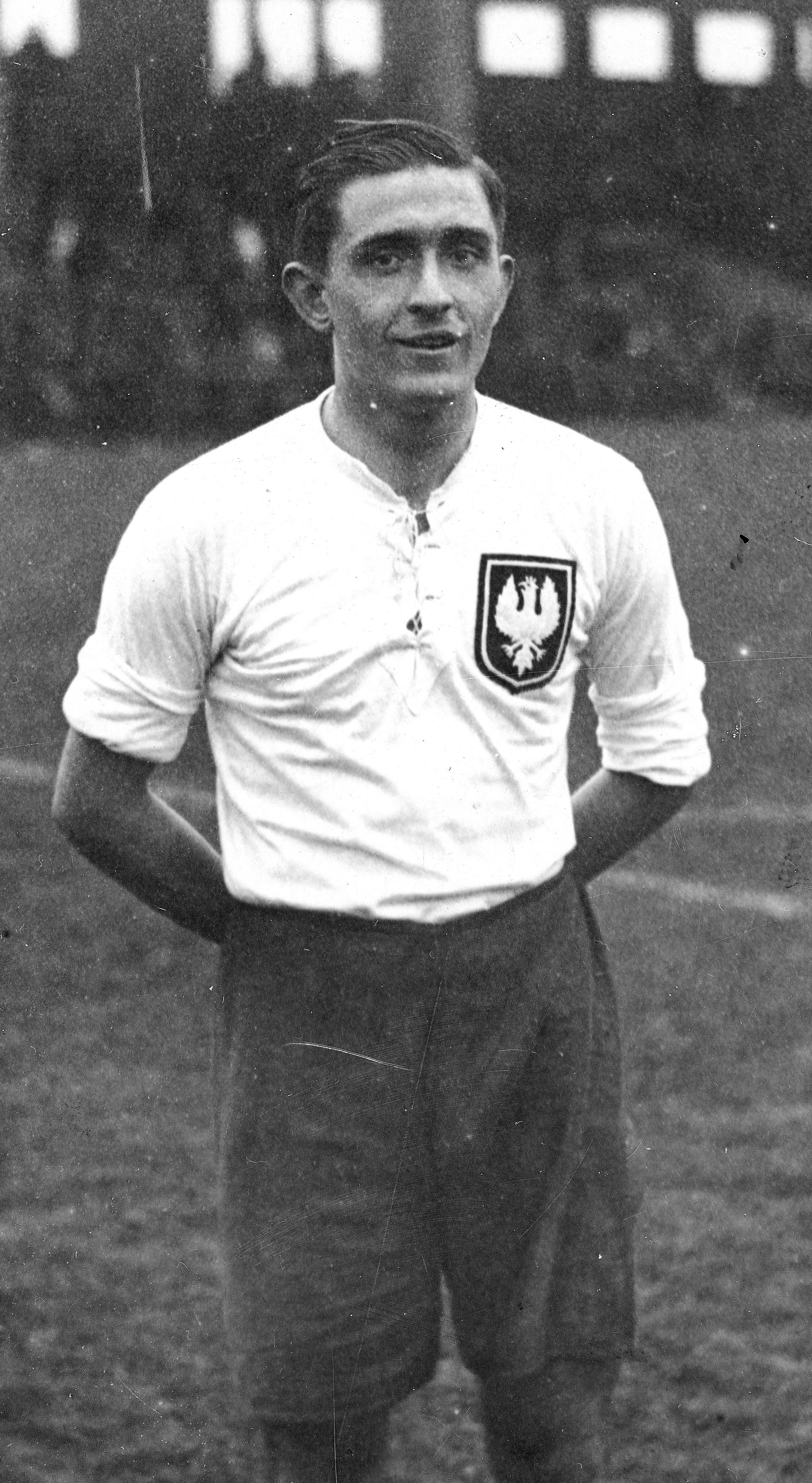

Personal information
- Date of birth: 7 February 1911
- Place of birth: Lubiń, German Empire
- Date of death: 26 December 1942 (aged 31)
- Place of death: Auschwitz concentration camp, German-occupied Poland
- Height: 1.70 m (5 ft 7 in)
- Position: Forward

Youth career
- 1924–1928: Warta Poznań

Senior career*
| Years | Team | Apps | (Gls) |
| 1928–1934 | Warta Poznań | | |
| 1935–1939 | Warszawianka | | |

International career
| 1931–1935 | Poland | 2 | (2) |
- * Club domestic league appearances and goals

Adam Knioła (7 February 1911 – 26 December 1942) was a Polish footballer who played as a forward. He earned two caps for the Poland national team from 1931 to 1935.

He was killed in the Auschwitz concentration camp during World War II.

== Honours ==
Warta Poznań

- Ekstraklasa: 1929
