= Jan Wojciechowski =

Polish footballer

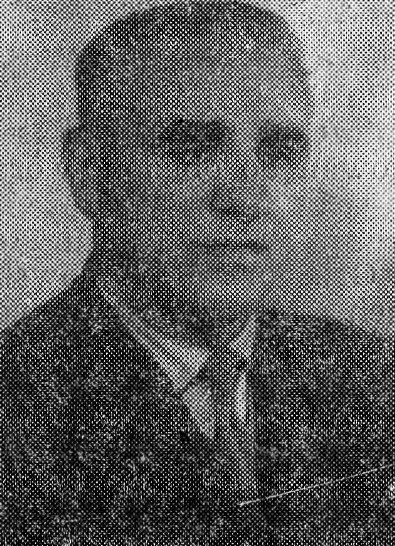

Personal information
- Date of birth: 7 October 1904
- Place of birth: Czarnotki, German Empire
- Date of death: 2 May 1986 (aged 81)
- Place of death: Poznań, Poland
- Position: Midfielder

Senior career*
Years	Team	Apps	(Gls)
1924–1934	Warta Poznań		

International career
1928–1930	Poland	2	(0)
- * Club domestic league appearances and goals

Jan Wojciechowski (7 October 1904 – 2 May 1986) was a Polish footballer who played as a midfielder.

He made two appearances for the Poland national team from 1928 to 1930.

== Honours ==
Warta Poznań

- Ekstraklasa: 1929
