= Marian Spoida =

Polish football coach and player

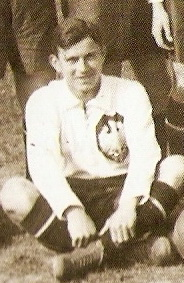

Personal information
- Date of birth: 4 January 1901
- Place of birth: Poznań, German Empire
- Date of death: 16 April 1940 (aged 39)
- Place of death: Katyn, Soviet Union
- Position: Midfielder

Senior career*
Years	Team	Apps	(Gls)
–1915	Chelsea Poznań		
1915–1916	Posnania Poznań		
1916–1929	Warta Poznań		
1930	Ostrovia Ostrów Wielkopolski		

International career
1922–1928	Poland	14	(0)

Managerial career
- 1930: Ostrovia Ostrów Wielkopolski
- 1930: Legia Poznań
- 1931: Warta Poznań
- 1931–1932: Warta Poznań
- 1938: Poland (caretaker)
- * Club domestic league appearances and goals

Marian Spoida (4 January 1901 - 16 April 1940) was a Polish football player and manager. Born on 4 January 1901 in Poznań, he was executed by the Soviet secret services in Katyn on 16 April 1940, aged 39.

In the 1920s, Spoida represented both Warta Poznań and the Poland national team. Later, he became a coach, and was the assistant under Poland head coach Józef Kałuża at the 1938 FIFA World Cup.

== Honours ==
=== Player ===
Warta Poznań

- Ekstraklasa: 1929

== See also ==
- Poland at the 1938 FIFA World Cup
