= Kajetan Kryszkiewicz =

Polish footballer (1908–1982)

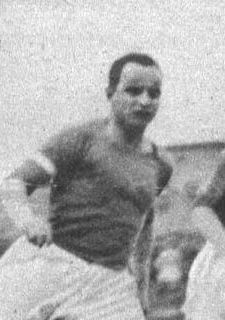

Personal information
- Date of birth: 28 July 1908
- Place of birth: Poznań, Province of Posen, Prussia
- Date of death: 2 October 1982 (aged 74)
- Place of death: Godziesze Wielkie, Polish People's Republic
- Height: 1.70 m (5 ft 7 in)
- Position: Forward

Senior career*
Years	Team	Apps	(Gls)
1922–1931	Posnania Poznań		
1932–1938	Warta Poznań		(60)
1938–1939	BBTS Bielsko		
1946–1947	Prosna Kalisz		

International career
1937	Poland	2	(0)
- * Club domestic league appearances and goals

Kajetan Kryszkiewicz (28 July 1908 – 2 October 1982) was a Polish footballer who played as a forward. He represented Warta Poznań and also capped twice for the Poland national team without scoring any goals. He began his career in Posnania Poznań, later moving to Warta Poznań, a powerhouse of Polish football in the 1930s. In 1932, he was the top scorer of the Ekstraklasa, with 16 goals.

Kryszkiewicz continued playing for Warta until 1938.

== Honours ==
Individual

- Ekstraklasa top scorer: 1932
