= Edmund Twórz =

Polish footballer

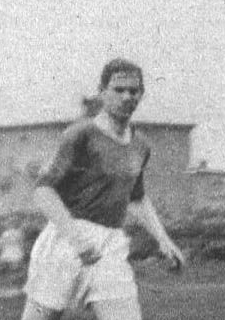

Personal information
- Full name: Edmund Franciszek Twórz
- Date of birth: 12 February 1914
- Place of birth: Schmiegel, German Empire
- Date of death: 29 September 1987 (aged 73)
- Place of death: Gdańsk, Poland
- Position: Defender

Senior career*
Years	Team	Apps	(Gls)
1929–1936	Unia Kościan		
1936–1939	Warta Poznań		
1949–1954	Ogniwo Sopot		
1955–1956	Sparta Sopot		

International career
1937–1939	Poland	6	(0)
- * Club domestic league appearances and goals

Edmund Franciszek Twórz (12 February 1914 – 29 September 1987) was a Polish footballer who played as a defender.

He was in the initial Polish squad for the 1938 FIFA World Cup, but was left out of the final 15- player roster that traveled to Strasbourg. During that time, he played for Warta Poznań and earned six caps for Poland.

== References and sources ==
- Andrzej Gowarzewski : "Fuji Football Encyclopedia : History of the Polish National Team(1) White and Red"; GiA Katowice 1991
- Edmund Twórz at WorldFootball.net
