= 1947 Polish Football Championship =

21st season of top-tier football league in Poland

Polish Football Championship
- Season: 1947
- Dates: 30 March 1947 – 30 November 1947
- Champions: Warta Poznań (2nd title)
- Matches: 6
- Goals: 24 (4 per match)
- Top goalscorer: Mieczysław Gracz (4 goals)
- Biggest home win: Warta 4–1 AKS (2 November 1947); Wisła 3–0 AKS (16 November 1947); Warta 5–2 Wisła (30 November 1947)
- Biggest away win: AKS 1–4 Wisła (9 November 1947)
- Highest scoring: Warta 5–2 Wisła (30 November 1947)
- Highest attendance: 25,000

The 1947 Polish Football Championship was the 21st edition of the Polish Football Championship and 19th completed season ended with the selection of a winner. It was the last edition of the Polish championship played in a non-league formula, since 1948 the champion of the country was chosen in the league. The champions were Warta Poznań, who won their 2nd Polish title.

== Competition modus ==
The championship was decided in a series of tournaments. The tournaments started on 30 March 1947 and concluded on 30 November 1947 (spring-autumn system). 28 teams was divided into 3 groups. In each of groups the season was played as a round-robin tournament. A total of 28 teams participated. Each team played a total of matches, half at home and half away, two games against each other team. Teams received two points for a win and one point for a draw. The winners of each group played a Final Group tournament for the title.

== Final tournament tables ==
=== Group 1 ===
Poster advertising a game between Skra Częstochowa and Polonia Bytom

Pos	Team	Pld	W	D	L	GF	GA	GD	Pts	Qualification
1	Wisła Kraków	16	14	1	1	101	9	+92	29	Qualification to final group
2	Polonia Warsaw	16	10	4	2	70	26	+44	24	
3	Polonia Bytom	16	10	2	4	57	35	+22	22	
4	KKS Poznań	16	10	1	5	91	28	+63	21	
5	Polonia Świdnica	16	7	1	8	32	39	−7	15	
6	Szombierki Bytom	16	7	1	8	31	46	−15	15	
7	Skra Częstochowa	16	6	0	10	36	63	−27	12	
8	Ognisko Siedlce	16	3	0	13	30	107	−77	6	
9	Motor Białystok	16	0	0	16	14	109	−95	0	

Source: rsssf.com

=== Group 2 ===
Pos	Team	Pld	W	D	L	GF	GA	GD	Pts	Qualification
1	AKS Chorzów	18	14	2	2	61	21	+40	30	Qualification to final group
2	KS Cracovia	18	12	5	1	75	18	+57	29	
3	Rymer Niedobczyce	18	10	2	6	58	40	+18	22	
4	RKU Sosnowiec	18	9	4	5	39	33	+6	22	
5	Radomiak Radom	18	7	4	7	48	34	+14	18	
6	Pomorzanin Toruń	18	7	4	7	41	42	−1	18	
7	Gedania Gdańsk	18	7	3	8	47	44	+3	17	
8	Orzeł Gorlice	18	5	2	11	35	52	−17	12	
9	ZZK Łódź	18	4	1	13	31	73	−42	9	
10	Grochów Warszawa	18	1	1	16	21	99	−78	3	

Source: rsssf.com

=== Group 3 ===
Pos	Team	Pld	W	D	L	GF	GA	GD	Pts	Qualification
1	Warta Poznań	16	14	0	2	68	18	+50	28	Qualification to final group
2	Garbarnia Kraków	16	13	0	3	60	19	+41	26	
3	ŁKS Łódź	16	12	1	3	78	24	+54	25	
4	Tęcza Kielce	16	8	1	7	34	36	−2	17	
5	Lublinianka Lublin	16	7	3	6	39	43	−4	17	
6	Czuwaj Przemyśl	16	5	2	9	24	33	−9	12	
7	WMKS Katowice	16	5	1	10	25	49	−24	11	
8	KKS Olsztyn	16	2	3	11	19	61	−42	7	
9	PKS Szczecin	16	0	1	15	13	77	−64	1	

Source: rsssf.com

=== Final Group ===
Pos	Team	Pld	W	D	L	GF	GA	GD	Pts
1	Warta Poznań (C)	4	4	0	0	13	3	+10	8
2	Wisła Kraków	4	2	0	2	9	8	+1	4
3	AKS Chorzów	4	0	0	4	2	13	−11	0

Source: rsssf.com
(C) Champions

== Top goalscorers ==
Rank	Player	Club	Goals
1	(Poland) Mieczysław Gracz	Wisła Kraków	4
2	(Poland) Henryk Czapczyk	Warta Poznań	3
2	(Poland) Bolesław Gendera	Warta Poznań	3
2	(Poland) Marian Skrzypniak	Warta Poznań	3
2	(Poland) Bolesław Smólski	Warta Poznań	3

== Bibliography ==
- Gowarzewski, Andrzej (2000). Encyklopedia Piłkarska Fuji. Liga Polska. O tytuł mistrza Polski 1920–2000 (in Polish). GiA, Katowice. ISBN 83-88232-02-9.
- Gowarzewski, Andrzej (1994). Encyklopedia Piłkarska Fuji. 75 lat PZPN. Księga jubileuszowa (in Polish). GiA, Katowice. ISBN 83-902751-1-2.
- Gowarzewski, Andrzej (2000). Encyklopedia Piłkarska Fuji. Album 80 lat PZPN (in Polish). GiA, Katowice.
- Gowarzewski, Andrzej (2010). Encyklopedia Piłkarska Fuji. Album 90 lat PZPN (in Polish). GiA, Katowice.
