= Marcin Oleksy =

Polish disabled footballer

Personal information
- National team: Poland
- Born: 11 April 1987 (age 38) Nowa Sól, Poland

Sport
- Sport: Amputee football
- Position: Forward
- Club: Warta Poznań

Marcin Oleksy (born 11 April 1987) is a Polish amputee footballer who plays as a forward for Warta Poznań and the Poland national amputee football team. He was the winner of the FIFA Puskás Award in 2022.

== Biography ==
Until 2010, Oleksy played as a goalkeeper for Polish club Korona Kożuchów. His coach, Andrzej Sawicki, was under the impression that he could have achieved a lot in his further career. In 2010, Olesky stopped his career to focus on working as a construction worker.

In November 2010, Oleksy lost his leg to an accident at his workplace. In 2019, he started playing for Warta Poznań, and in 2021 for the Poland national amputee team.

== Puskás Award ==
On 28 February 2023, Oleksy received the FIFA Puskás Award for the best goal of the year, which he claimed at The Best FIFA Football Awards 2022 Gala. His goal won over other finalists Dimitri Payet and Richarlison. The winning goal was an overhead kick scored on 6 November 2022 in a match between Warta Poznań and Stal Rzeszów. He was the first Polish player and first amputee footballer to win the award, as well as the oldest winner at the age of 35.
