= Warta Poznań =

Multi-sport club in Poland

- Full name: Warta Poznań Spółka Akcyjna
- Nickname: Zieloni (The Greens)
- Founded: 15 June 1912; 114 years ago
- Ground: Ogródek by TedGifted.com
- Capacity: 720
- Chairman: Artur Meissner
- Manager: Maciej Tokarczyk
- League: I liga
- 2025–26: II liga, 2nd of 18 (promoted)
- Website: http://wartapoznan.pl/
Home colours	Away colours	Third colours

Warta Poznań (Polish pronunciation: [ˈvarta ˈpɔznaj̃]) is a multi-sports club based in Poznań, Poland. The name means the Guard in Polish and also the name of the river Warta on which Poznań is located. As of the 2026–27 season, they compete in the second division, after winning promotion from the 2025–26 II liga.

Founded in 1912, the association football club are two-time winners of the Polish Football Championship, in 1929 and 1947. In 2020, Warta returned to the Polish Ekstraklasa after being absent for 25 years. The club played four seasons in the top division until relegation in 2024. The club also played in the top level of the Polish football league system from 1927 to 1939, 1946 to 1950, and 1993 to 1995.

In its history, the club celebrated many successes in disciplines such as boxing (the club won the Polish championship 11 times between 1927 and 1939), field hockey (the club won the Polish championship 12 times between 1963 and 1980) and tennis (Wiesław Gąsiorek of Warta was Polish champion 12 times between 1959 and 1970). In total, Warta teams, sportsmen and sportswomen won almost 800 medals in Polish championship competitions in different sports disciplines.

== History ==
=== Beginnings (1912–1918) ===
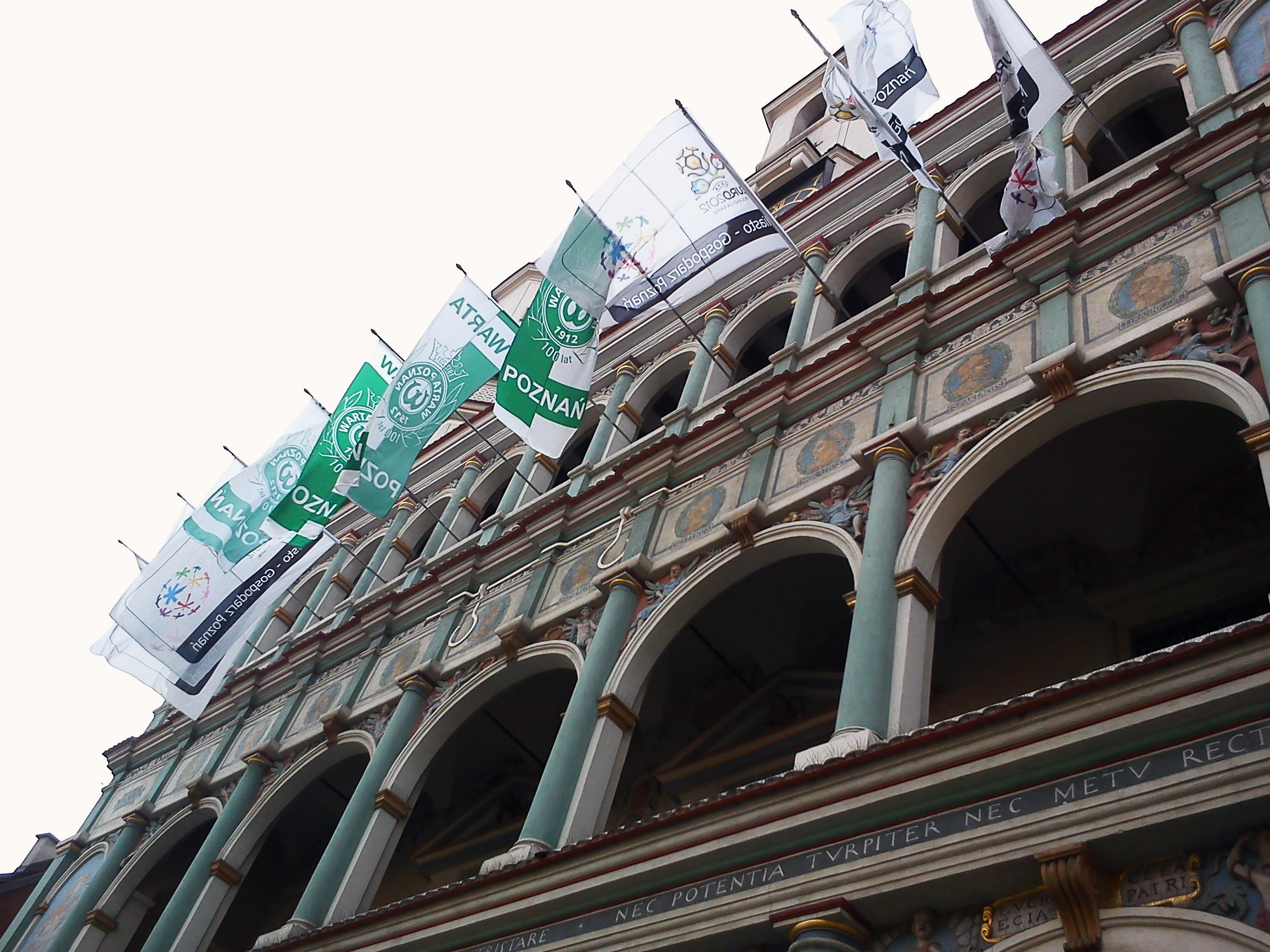
The green colours of Warta displayed on Poznań's Town Hall honouring the club's 100th anniversary in 2012

On 15 June 1912, the Warta Poznań Sports Club (Klub Sportowy Warta Poznań) was established, which later became known as "the first lady of Wielkopolska". Its founders were young Poles who previously played in the German clubs in Poznań, including Marian Bey, Stefan Malinowski, Stefan Mórkowski, brothers Edmund and Franciszek Szyc and Ludwik Zysnarski. They were included in the first board of the club, whose first president - as the oldest member of the board - became Franciszek Szyc. His brother Edmund was appointed secretary, and Marian Bey was the team captain. At the founding meeting, white and green were chosen as statutory colours. In addition to football, Warta formed an athletics section in 1912 and then a tennis section in 1914.

During German rule, matches involving Polish teams were forbidden, which prompted the decision to organize the first Wielkopolska football championship in 1913, in which three teams participated: Warta Poznań, Posnania and Ostrovia Ostrów Wielkopolski. Warta became the first champion. The results were as follows: Posnania - Warta 1–1, Warta - Ostrovia 3–2, Ostrovia - Warta 3–4, Warta - Posnania 2–2.

The inaugural championship of the region resulted in a surge of football popularity in Poznań. New football teams emerged such as Trytonia founded in Łazarz and a team called Sparta established in Jeżyce. In 1914, despite the start of hostilities related to the outbreak of World War I, efforts were made in Poznań to organize sports events, which was made more difficult by the martial law imposed by the Germans. In general, the regulations did not allow any kind of meeting or assembly to be held without official permits. Despite these difficulties, in 1914 the second Wielkopolska Championships were held, in which only two teams participated: Warta Poznań and KS Posnania. In this two-legged tie, Warta smoothly defeated Posnania 6–3 and 2–1.

There is no reliable information about the 1915 Wielkopolska championship. But Warta also played various friendly matches against Polish and German teams during the war years, including Fever Kościan (1–3 and 5–5) and DSV Posen (2–2) in 1915, and Stella Gniezno (2–2) in 1916. Particularly noteworthy was the 4–0 victory against DSV Posen in 1916 - DSV (Deutscher Sport Verein) was a German football club considered the best football club in Poznań until then. In 1917, Warta celebrated its 5th anniversary year by organising a tournament with the participation of the best football teams from Poznań.

Also in 1917, Franciszek Rotnicki became chairman of the club and, during his chairmanship (1917–1924), he laid the structural foundations for Warta's future successes. It was said at the time: "... A man of great authority, energetic and enterprising. It is he, together with a skilfully selected group of associates, who builds solid foundations for the future size of the club in this difficult period.".

=== Interwar period (1918–1939) ===
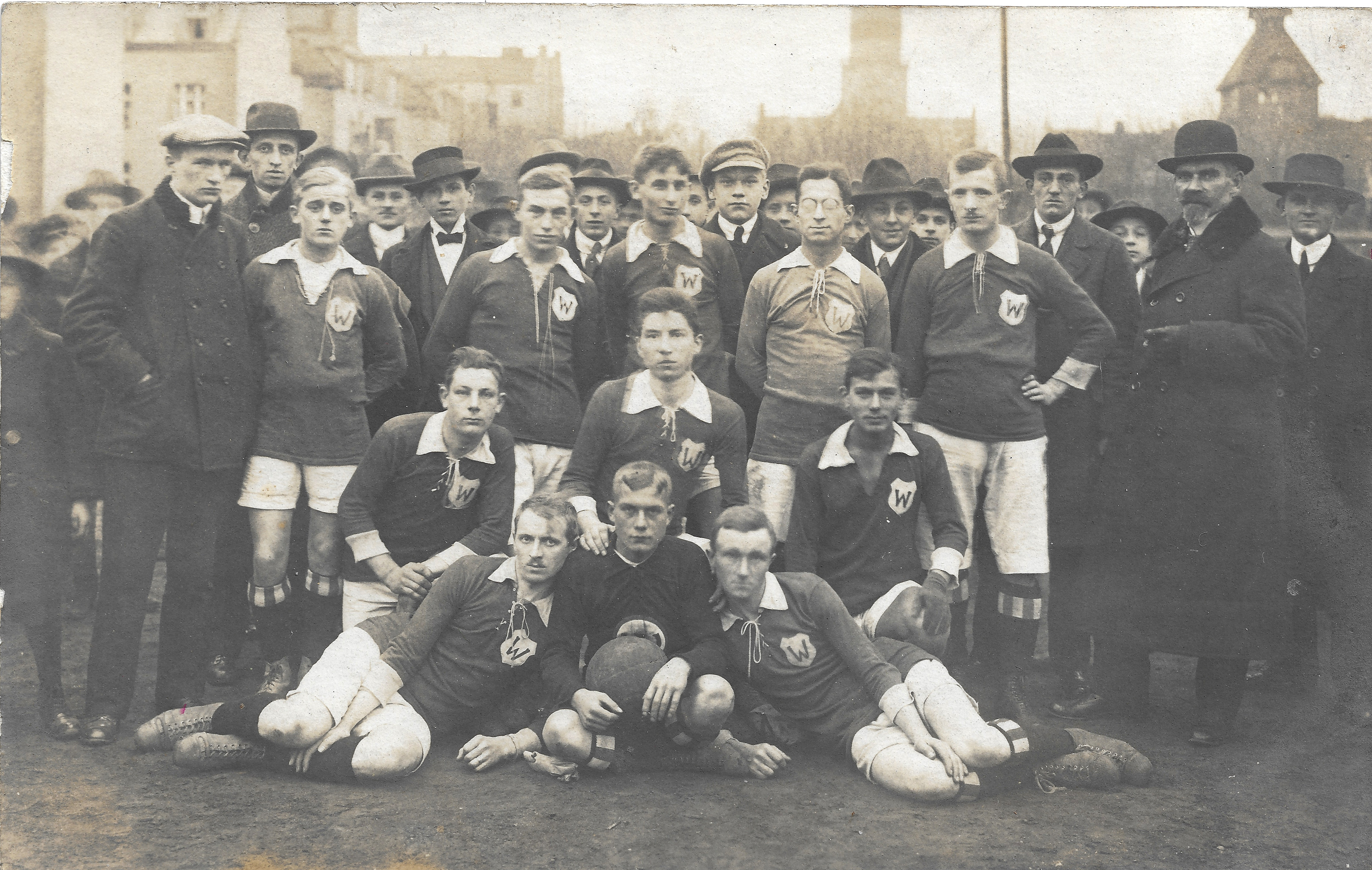
Warta Poznań football team in 1920, Edmund Szyc (football player wearing glasses), chairman Rotnicki standing (second from right)

World War I hostilities caused enormous losses. Out of 100 Warta club members in 1914, 45 fought in the war, and two founding members – Edmund Szyc and Stefan Malinowski – died in the war. During the successful Greater Poland Uprising against German partitioning authorities, many footballers from Poznań volunteered for military service to fight for their country but the restoration of an independent Polish state after 123 years in 1918 also provided new opportunities, as Polish sports clubs were able to function without interference from foreign powers.

In 1919, pre-war sports structures were re-activated, and the first post-war Wielkopolska championship was held. Five teams entered the competition, including four teams from Poznań - Unia, Warta, Posnania, and Pogoń - as well as Ostrovia from Ostrów Wielkopolski. Warta won the championship, after beating Ostrovia 7–1, Unia 3–2, Posnania 7–0 and Pogoń 7–0. In the following year, the regional championship was abandoned because of the Polish-Soviet War.

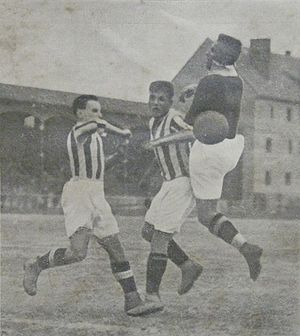
Friendly match against Cracovia in August 1924, Władysław Przybysz of Warta on the right

In 1921, the first Polish national football championship was successfully held (the championship was previously started and then abandoned in 1920 because of the Polish–Soviet War). It was run similar to a cup competition, according to the "spring-autumn" system, until 1927. In the spring, Warta participated in the Klasa A regional district championship (Warta became champion in 1921, 1922, 1923 and 1926, in 1924-1925 no champion was crowned), with football clubs from Wielkopolska such as Warta, Pogoń and Stella Gniezno. In the autumn, the winners from five regional districts played against each other at national level. Under the club chairmanship of Stanisław Broniarz (chairman 1924 to 1927, deputy chairman 1927 to 1929), Warta was a leading proponent and founding member of the Polish football league, which was launched in 1927.

The interwar period was Warta's golden era and Warta was a leading football team in Poland. Between 1922 and 1928, Warta was always in the top three teams in the Polish football championship (there was no championship in 1924). Finally, with the Hungarian coach Béla Fűrst in charge, Warta won its first Polish football championship in 1929. In that season, Warta won 15 out of 24 league matches, it lost fewest goals of all teams (33) and it had - jointly with Cracovia - the best goal difference (+25).

The global economic crisis of 1929 negatively affected Polish sports clubs, including Warta. Despite these difficulties, throughout the 1930s, Warta was again in the top three football clubs in the top division on four occasions. In 1932, Kajetan Kryszkiewicz and Friedrich Scherfke were jointly the top goal scorers in the league, with 15 goals each. Other sports disciplines also fared well. In 1920, the Poznań municipal government handed over large sports grounds to Warta. Warta launched new sports sections, including field hockey (1923), boxing (1924), swimming (1928) and ice hockey (1930). Warta's boxing team won the Polish championship 11 times and Warta's athletics team won the Polish championship five times.

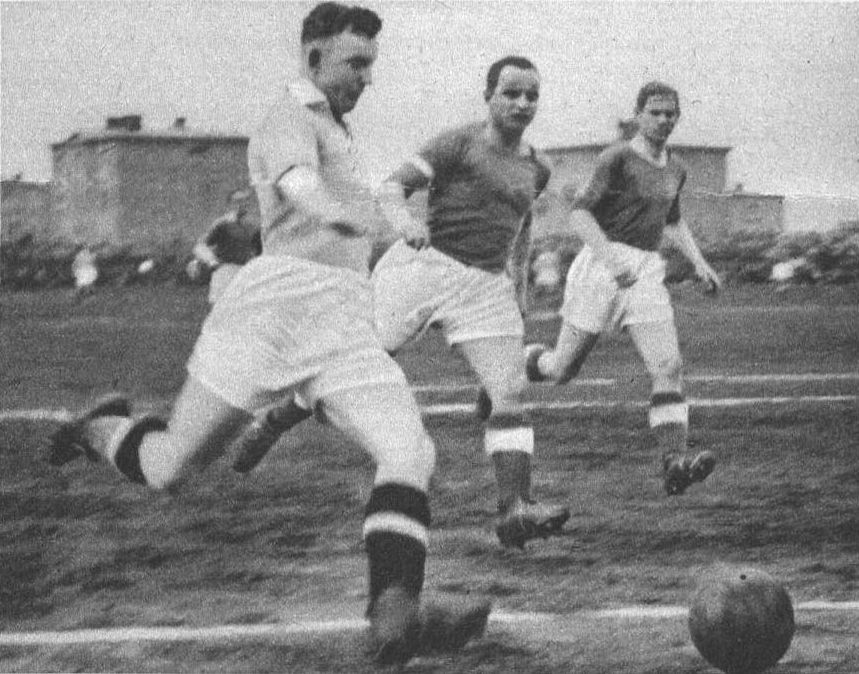
Match against Ruch Hajduki Wielkie in 1937, Wilimowski on the ball, Kajetan Kryszkiewicz and Edmund Twórz of Warta defending

Warta Poznań encouraged innovations in sports in the inter-war period. In 1929, the victorious Warta match against the Dutch champions Philips Eindhoven (today's PSV Eindhoven) was the first football match broadcast on Polish radio (Warta won 5–2). In September 1933, the Warta match against Legia Poznań was the first football match in Poland to be played using artificial lighting.

Polish teams did not yet participate in annual European football club competitions, but the Warta team travelled abroad on many occasions to play friendly games and to take part in football tournaments. Every year, various football teams from Germany, Hungary and elsewhere travelled to Poznań to play Warta. In September 1934, for example, FC Milan (today's AC Milan) travelled to Poznań to play against Warta (Warta lost 1–3).

=== World War II (1939–1945) ===
At the start of World War II in 1939, the football season was interrupted and was never completed. The club was forced to suspend its operations. Poles were not permitted to participate in organised sports events during the German occupation, but some Warta football players clandestinely took part in an unofficial Poznań football championship in 1940 and 1941, with games played on football pitches on the outskirts of town.

During the war, the German occupiers destroyed many documents and club mementos. Some former Warta sportsmen and board members were murdered in German concentration camps. For example, former Warta footballers Marian Einbacher and Adam Knioła were murdered in the Auschwitz concentration camp, while former Warta club chairman Stanisław Broniarz was murdered in the Gross-Rosen concentration camp. Three pre-war players, Marian Spoida, Konrad Ofierzyński and Telesfor Banaszkiewicz, were among Poles murdered by the Soviets in the large Katyn massacre in April–May 1940.

=== Postwar period (1945–1990) ===
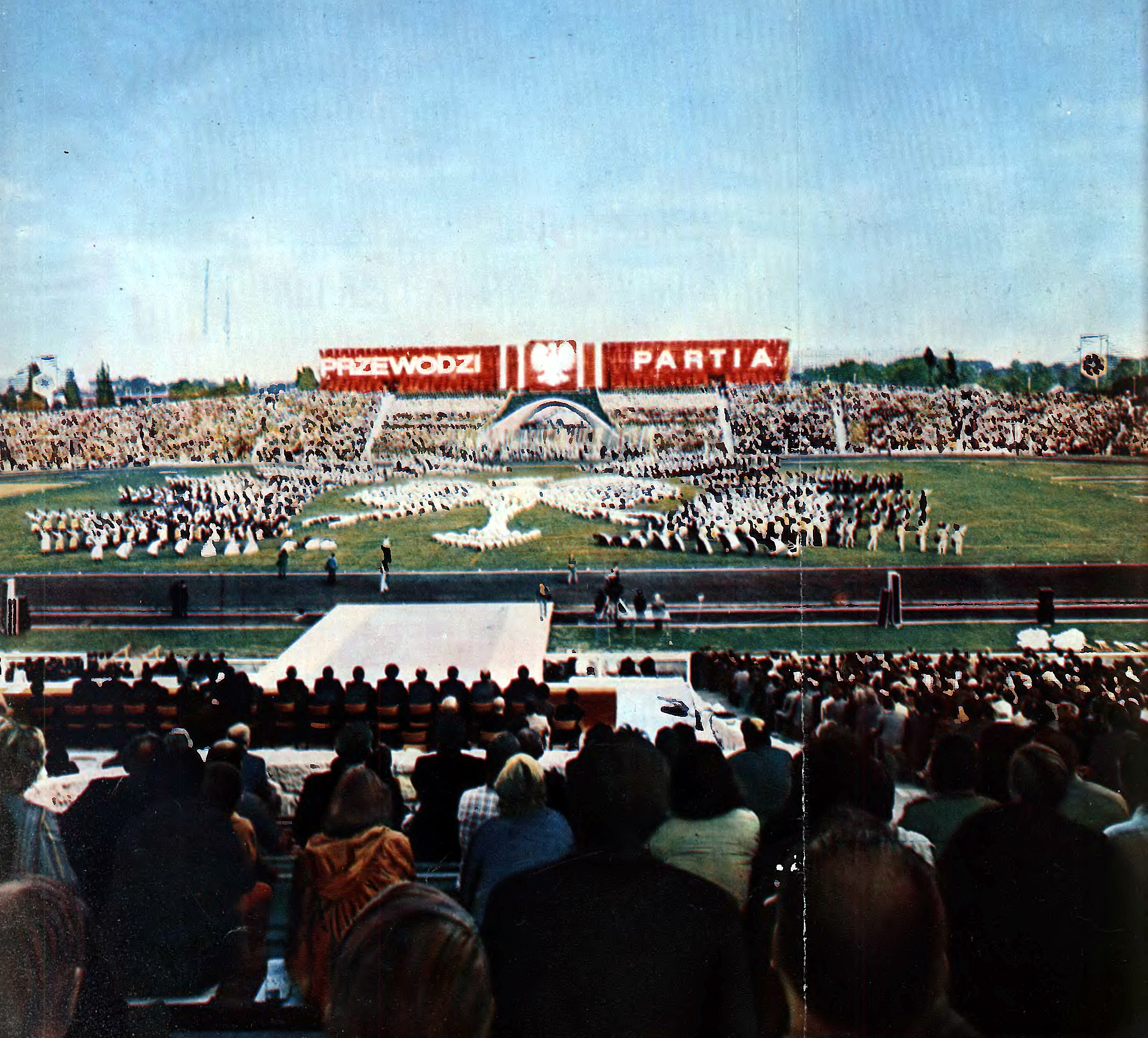
A Communist Party harvest festival in the Edmund Szyc stadium in 1974

A formal general meeting was held on 18 March 1945 and the club's operations were revived. Already in the first post-war season of the Polish football league in 1946, Warta finished the season in second place, losing in the final against Polonia Warsaw (for two years after the war, the Polish championship was contested like a cup competition).

A year later in 1947, Warta played outstanding football under the direction of the Hungarian coach Károly Fogl. In the semi-final of the Polish championship competition, Warta won against AKS Chorzów 4–1 and 2–0. In the final, Warta beat Wisła Kraków 2–0 away in Kraków. Interest in the final match in Poznań was enormous and the stadium attendance was higher than nominal capacity (over 20 000 spectators). The exciting match finished with Warta's victory 5–2 and Warta won its second – and so far, last – championship title in its history.

However, the Stalinism era ended the series of Warta's successes, as regional Communist leadership favoured the local rival Lech Poznań. In 1949, Warta was de facto forced to change its name to Związkowiec Poznań, which resulted in the disappearance of the historical name Warta. In 1950, Warta was forced to merge with the sports club HCP, which belonged to the Hipolit Cegielski Poznań works – a leading industrial company in Poznań. The HCP team played under the name Stal and the merged club used the name. In the same year, Warta's football team was relegated from the top division. From 1951 to 1956, the club played under the name Stal Poznań.

On 29 December 1956, a general meeting of the club decided to return to the old name Warta. The Hipolit Cegielski Poznań works continued to sponsor the club. Their involvement did not return Warta to its former glory, but it significantly helped to develop the club's logistical base. Warta received funds to re-develop its sports facilities and was able to use the Edmund Szyc Stadium (then called ''22 July Stadium") with a capacity of 60,000.

During the post-war period, the Warta football team never returned to the top flight. However, Warta celebrated successes in other sports – most notably, in field hockey and tennis. In field hockey, Warta won the Polish championship 12 times between 1963 and 1980 and they were runners-up nine times between 1957 and 1981. Warta participated in the EuroHockey Club Champions Cup (Europe's premier field hockey club competition) six times between 1969 and 1977, coming fifth in Europe in the 1969 EuroHockey Club Champions Cup.

In the Polish tennis league, Warta's tennis team became Polish champions in 1965 and 1970 and were runners-up in 1961, 1964, 1966, and 1969. Warta's tennis section was particularly known for the individual achievements of Wiesław Gąsiorek, who was Polish men's singles champion 12 times between 1959 and 1970. In gymnastics, artistic gymnasts Zdzisław Lesiński and Urszula Łukomska represented the club at the 1952 Summer Olympics.

In 1989, at the end of the Communist period, Warta and Hipolit Cegielski Poznań works parted ways. After some negotiations, the Edmund Szyc Stadium and the sports grounds were transferred to the club.

=== Post-Communist period (1990–2011) ===
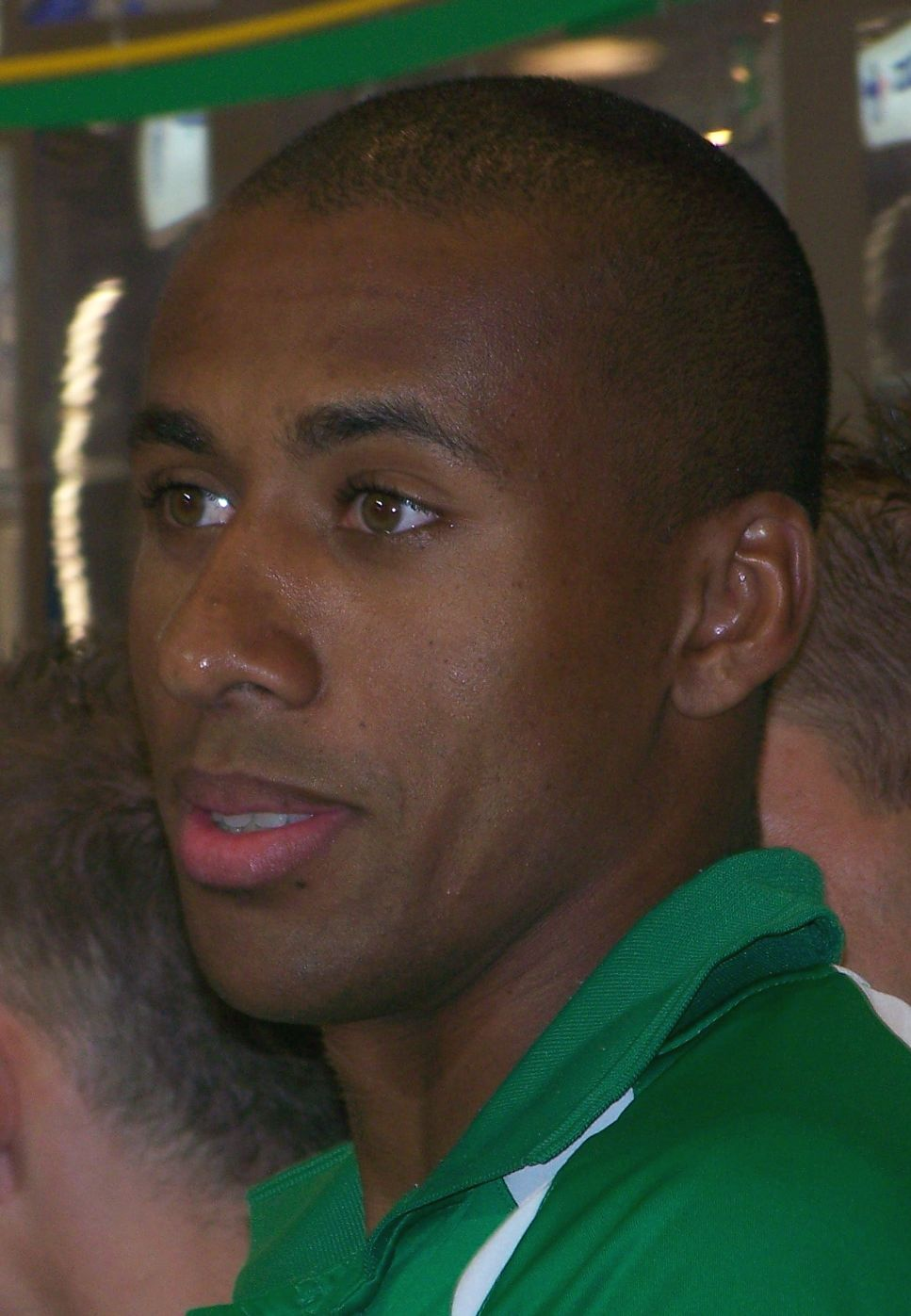
Alain Ngamayama - former Warta captain and club hero who was with Warta since its youth team

At the beginning of the 1990s, Warta returned to the top tier of the Polish football league system after 43 years.

In 1993, Warta was promoted to Poland’s top tier division for the first time since 1950, after winning the “Western conference” of the second tier league in the 1992-1993 season. Warta finished the 1993-1994 Ekstraklasa season in 14th position, with 8 points above the relegation zone.

The 1994-1995 Ekstraklasa season was historic, as it was the only season in history that featured three football clubs from Poznań in the top tier division: Warta Poznań, Lech Poznań and Olimpia Poznań. However, suffering from ailing debts, Warta finished bottom of the table and the club was relegated from the top division.

Warta's bad run continued and the club was relegated from the second tier in 1996. The club mostly played in the third tier of the league system over the next decade.

The Edmund Szyc Stadium fell into disrepair by 1998. Warta subsequently played its football matches in the Warta Poznań Stadium, the former training ground of the Edmund Szyc Stadium, nicknamed Ogródek (Little Garden).

In the 2007–08 season, Warta returned to the second tier of the Polish football league system. The club's best result was the 7th position (out of 18 teams) in the 2010-11 season.

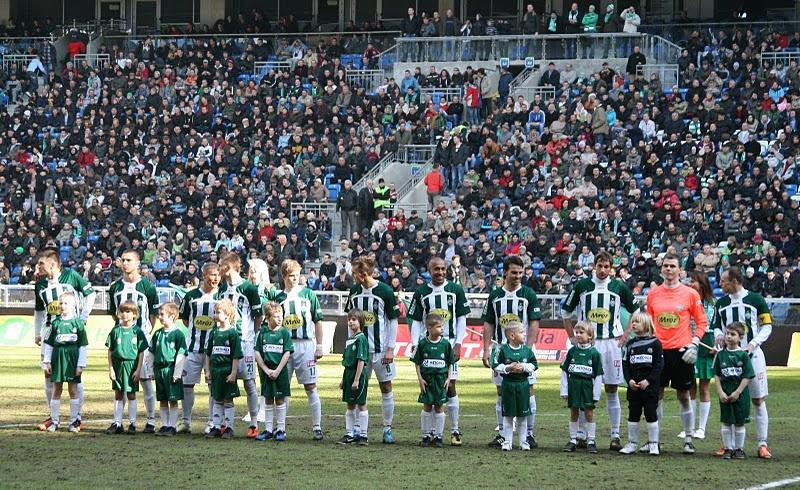
Warta team before a home game against GKS Katowice in the 2010–11 season

=== Pyżalska era (2011-2018) ===
In January 2011, former model and new owner Izabella Łukomska-Pyżalska became chairwoman. Debts of the ailing club were repaid and the budget was increased. Warta started to play its games in the Municipal Stadium in Poznań. However, Warta remained in the second tier. After relegation in 2013 and because of club debts, Warta landed in the fourth tier of the league system where it spent the 2014–15 and 2015–16 seasons.

In 2016, Warta was promoted to II liga (the third tier of the league system).

In 2018, Warta was able to advance to the second tier again.

However, by the autumn of 2018, the club's finances were in serious trouble. The situation was so desperate that the football team captain Bartosz Kieliba said: "Several months of player wages are in arrears, there is no certainty whether we will ever play another game, which does not help our work in training or our stance in matches".

=== Farjaszewski era (2018–present) ===
In August 2018, businessman Bartłomiej Farjaszewski bought the football section of Warta (under the name: Warta Poznań SA) and repaid the club's debts. Following the legal separation in 2018, there are now two organisations: Warta Poznań SA focuses on all football teams, whereas KS Warta Poznań continues as a multi-sports club (which includes fencing, field hockey and swimming sections, among others).

In June 2019, Piotr Tworek replaced Petr Němec as head coach. In 2020, with experienced players such as Bartosz Kieliba and Łukasz Trałka, Warta surprisingly finished the 2019–20 I liga season in third place. After winning the promotion play-offs, Warta returned to the Polish Ekstraklasa after being absent for 25 years.

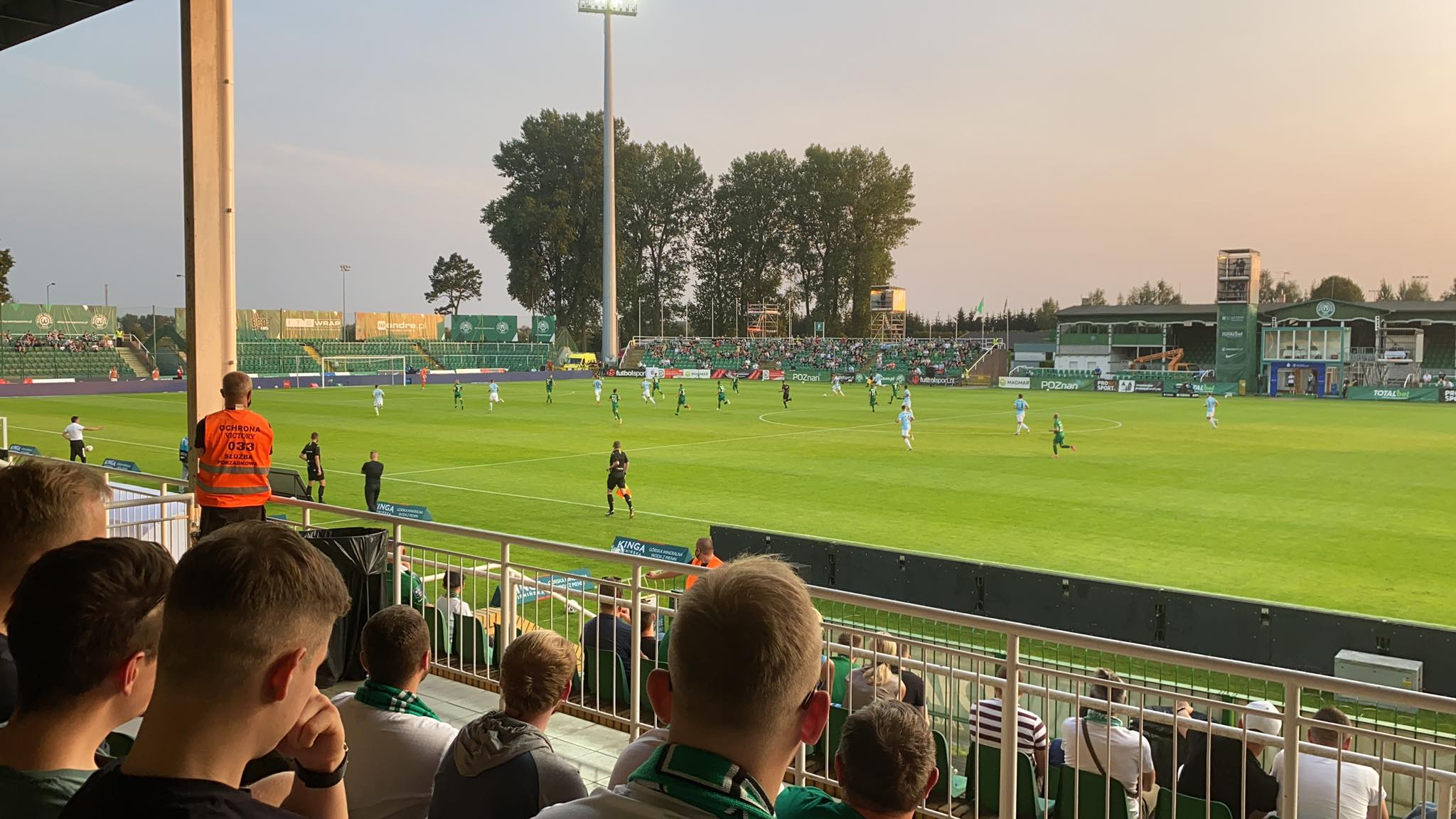
Stadion Dyskobolii Grodzisk Wielkopolski during the league match between Warta Poznań and Piast Gliwice in September 2020

At the start of the 2020–21 season, many football pundits predicted Warta's relegation. Defying expectations, with new players such as striker Mateusz Kuzimski (summer 2020 signing) and winger Makana Baku (on loan from January 2021), Warta finished fifth in the league, missing out on qualification to the UEFA Europa Conference League by just one point. This represented Warta football team's best result since winning the football championship in 1947.

Following Warta's poor start to the 2021–22 season (17th place in the league with eight points in thirteen league games), Dawid Szulczek replaced Tworek as head coach in November 2021. Under Szulczek, Warta finished 11th in the league in the 2021–22 season and 8th in the 2022–23 season.

Warta contested the 2023–24 season much in the same way as their recent top-flight campaigns, with a below-average budget and limited transfer activity. On 18 April 2024, Szulczek announced he would not extend his contract and depart Warta at the end of the season. On 25 May that year, the last matchday, Warta suffered a 0–3 defeat to Jagiellonia Białystok and were jumped in the standings by Korona Kielce following their away win over Lech Poznań. As a result, Warta finished 16th and were relegated, ending their four-year stay in the top division.

On 24 June 2024, Piotr Jacek was appointed as Szulczek's successor. With most of last season's roster replaced by youngsters and experienced second division players, Jacek was sacked two months into his stint and succeeded by Piotr Klepczarek. On 10 March 2025, after earning one point in the first four games of the year, Klepczarek was replaced with the experienced Ryszard Tarasiewicz. Warta's winless run continued until their successive relegation to II liga was confirmed on 11 May, following a 2–0 away defeat to Chrobry Głogów. Maciej Tokarczyk replaced Tarasiewicz as Warta's head coach ahead of the 2025–26 season. Warta returned to the I liga at the first time of asking after drawing their final game of the season against Resovia.

As the Warta Poznań Municipal Stadium (Ogródek) did not conform to Ekstraklasa and I liga licensing requirements, the senior Warta football team played its home games in the Stadion Dyskobolii Grodzisk Wielkopolski from 2020 to 2025. Subsequently, Ogródek underwent renovations in order to fulfil the II liga licensing requirements. After nearly six years, Warta played its first home game there on 7 September 2025, winning 1–0 against Zagłębie Sosnowiec.

== Other teams ==
Warta also operates youth teams (both boys and girls) in different age groups in the Central Junior League and an amputee football team. It also briefly fielded a women's football section.

== Honours ==
=== Football ===
- Polish Football Championship/Ekstraklasa
  - Champions: 1929, 1947
  - Runners-up: 1922, 1925, 1928, 1938, 1946
  - Third place: 1921, 1923, 1926, 1927, 1932, 1935, 1936
- Polish Football Championship (Prussia):
  - Champions: 1913, 1914
  - Runners-up: 1919

=== Youth teams ===
- Polish U19 Championship
  - Runners-up: 1936, 1975

=== Amputee football ===
- Amp Futbol Ekstraklasa (Polish amputee football championship):
  - Third place: 2023
- Marcin Oleksy: 2022 FIFA Puskás Award

=== Field hockey ===
- Polish men's championship:
  - Champions: 1963, 1965, 1967, 1968, 1969, 1970, 1971, 1972, 1973, 1975, 1976, 1980
  - Runners-up: 1938, 1957, 1961, 1962, 1964, 1966, 1974, 1977, 1978, 1981
  - Third place: 1952, 1953, 1954, 1956, 1958, 1982, 2011, 2019
- Polish indoor men's championship:
  - Champions: 1964, 1969, 1970, 1971, 1973, 1975, 1976, 1979, 1982
  - Runners-up: 1974, 1977, 1978
  - Third place: 1962, 1963, 1965, 1968, 1985

European cup competitions
Year	Competition	Tier level	Ranking	Host city
1969	Club Champions Cup	1	5	Brussels
1971	Club Champions Cup	1	12	Rome
1973	Club Champions Cup	1	6	Frankfurt am Main
1974	Club Champions Cup	1	7	Utrecht
1976	Club Champions Cup	1	11	Amsterdam
1977	Club Champions Cup	1	8	London
1981	Club Champions Trophy	2	4	Rome

== Players ==
=== Current squad ===
As of 18 September 2026

Note: Flags indicate national team as defined under FIFA eligibility rules; some limited exceptions apply. Players may hold more than one non-FIFA nationality.

No.	Pos.	Nation	Player
2	DF	POL	Kacper Lepczyński
3	DF	UKR	Oleksandr Azatskyi
4	DF	POL	Tomasz Wojcinowicz
6	MF	POL	Bartosz Lelito
7	MF	POL	Jakub Apolinarski
9	FW	POL	Mateusz Stanek
10	MF	POL	Antoni Młynarczyk (on loan from ŁKS Łódź)
11	MF	POL	Aleksander Wołczek (on loan from Śląsk Wrocław)
13	MF	POL	Jan Niedzielski
15	DF	POL	Paweł Kwiatkowski (on loan from Widzew Łódź)
16	MF	POL	Kacper Wybieralski
17	DF	POL	Marcel Stefaniak
18	DF	POL	Arkadiusz Najemski
19	MF	POL	Adrian Wnuk
20	MF	POL	Kacper Szymanek (on loan from Motor Lublin)

No.	Pos.	Nation	Player
21	DF	POL	Karol Kalata
22	MF	POL	Karol Łysiak
23	MF	POL	Patryk Kusztal (on loan from Zagłębie Lubin)
24	DF	UKR	Dmytro Avdeev
29	MF	POL	Kacper Rychert
33	GK	POL	Bartosz Piechowiak
35	DF	POL	Filip Jakubowski
42	GK	POL	Leo Przybylak (captain)
71	MF	POL	Sebastian Steblecki
74	DF	POL	Szymon Zalewski
77	MF	POL	Jakub Kendzia
99	FW	POL	Michał Smoczyński
—	GK	POL	Mikołaj Baran
—	MF	POL	Filip Rejczyk

=== Other players under contract ===
Note: Flags indicate national team as defined under FIFA eligibility rules; some limited exceptions apply. Players may hold more than one non-FIFA nationality.

No.	Pos.	Nation	Player
—	FW	POL	Igor Kornobis
—	MF	POL	Marcel Zylla

=== Out on loan ===
Note: Flags indicate national team as defined under FIFA eligibility rules; some limited exceptions apply. Players may hold more than one non-FIFA nationality.

No.	Pos.	Nation	Player
80	FW	POL	Iwo Wojciechowski (at Kotwica Kórnik until 30 June 2027)

=== Notable players ===
Had international caps for their respective countries. Players whose name is listed in bold represented their countries while playing for Warta.

Polish players

- (Poland) Marcin Adamski (1996)
- (Poland) Mieczysław Balcer (1945)
- (Poland) Grzegorz Bartczak (2012–13)
- (Poland) Bartosz Bereszyński (2011–12)
- (Poland) Andrzej Bledzewski (2011)
- (Poland) **Piotr Danielak** (1932–39, 1945–48)
- (Poland) **Marian Einbacher** (1913–25)
- (Poland) **Michał Flieger** (1924–35)
- (Poland) **Marian Fontowicz** (1923–38, 1945)
- (Poland) **Bolesław Gendera** (1935–39, 1946–52)
- (Poland) Michał Goliński (2011, 2013–14)
- (Poland) Tomasz Iwan (1993–94)
- (Poland) Czesław Jakołcewicz (1993–96, 1997–98)
- (Poland) Ryszard Jankowski (1973–1983)
- (Poland) Paweł Kaczorowski (2007–08)
- (Poland) Arkadiusz Kaliszan (1989–1992, 1994–95)
- (Poland) **Stanisław Kaźmierczak** (1936–39, 1945–49)
- (Poland) **Adam Knioła** (1924–34)
- (Poland) Robert Kolendowicz (1999)
- (Poland) Rafał Kosznik (2010–12)
- (Poland) **Kajetan Kryszkiewicz** (1932–38)
- (Poland) **Zbigniew Niziński** (1918–27, 1929)
- (Poland) Arkadiusz Onyszko (1994–96)
- (Poland) Krzysztof Pawlak (1979, 1993–94)
- (Poland) Szymon Pawłowski (2024–25)
- (Poland) Krzysztof Piskuła (2008)
- (Poland) **Władysław Przybysz** (1922–30)
- (Poland) **Witold Przykucki** (1924–35)
- (Poland) **Leon Radojewski** (1925–35)
- (Poland) Grzegorz Rasiak (1996–98, 2013–14)
- (Poland) Krzysztof Ratajczyk (1984–91)
- (Poland) Piotr Reiss (2009–12)
- (Poland) Maciej Scherfchen (2011–12, 2013–14)
- (Poland) **Friedrich Scherfke** (1925–39)
- (Poland) **Hieronim Schwartz** (1933–39)
- (Poland) Kazimierz Sidorczuk (1994–95)
- (Poland) **Marian Spoida** (1916–29)
- (Poland) Jakub Słowik (2012)
- (Poland) **Bolesław Smólski** (1937–39, 1946–50)
- (Poland) **Franciszek Sobkowiak** (1934–39)
- (Poland) **Wawrzyniec Staliński** (1919–30)
- (Poland) Grzegorz Szamotulski (2011)
- (Poland) Łukasz Trałka (2019–23)
- (Poland) **Edmund Twórz** (1936–39)
- (Poland) **Jan Wojciechowski** (1928–30)
- (Poland) Maciej Żurawski (1982–97)

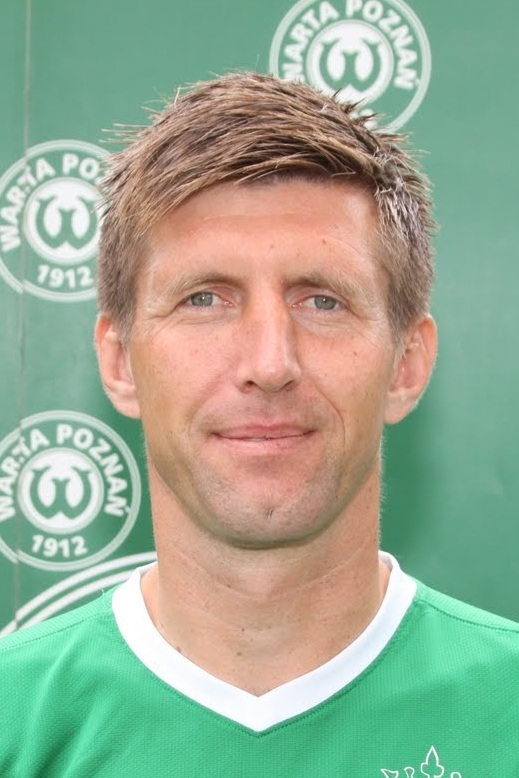
Grzegorz Rasiak - one of the most famous players of Warta Poznań

Foreign players

- (Nigeria) Emmanuel Ekwueme (2007–08)
- (Hungary) Márton Eppel (2023–24)
- (Finland) **Robert Ivanov** (2020–23)
- (Bulgaria) Ivaylo Markov (2024–25)
- (Ukraine) Yuriy Martynov (1991–92)
- (Finland) **Niilo Mäenpää** (2022–24)
- (Latvia) Aleksandr Pavlovets (2022)
- (Zimbabwe) **John Phiri** (1994)
- (Romania) Bogdan Țîru (2023–24)
- (Slovakia) **Adam Zreľák** (2021–24)

== Coaching staff ==
As of 26 July 2025

Position	Staff
Head coach	(Poland) Maciej Tokarczyk
Assistant coaches	(Poland) Grzegorz Adamski (Poland) Jędrzej Łągiewka
Goalkeeping coach	(Poland) Artur Szóstak
Fitness coach	(Poland) Jacek Maćkowiak
Physiotherapists	(Poland) Klaudia Jędraszyk (Poland) Wojciech Danielewicz
Team manager	(Poland) Karol Majewski

Source: Warta Poznań

== Managers ==
As of 16 January 2026

- (Hungary) Béla Fűrst (1921 – 1922)
- (Hungary) Gyula Bíró (June 1924 – November 1925)
- (Hungary) Béla Fűrst (March 1929 – July 1930)
- (Poland) Zygfryd Kosicki (August 1930 – December 1930)
- (Poland) Marian Spoida (March 1931 – August 1931)
- (Poland) Kazimierz Śmiglak (August 1931 – September 1931)
- (Poland) Marian Spoida (September 1931 – April 1932)
- (Poland) Kazimierz Śmiglak (May 1932 – June 1932)
- (Poland) Józef Waxmann (July 1932 – June 1933)
- (Poland) Zygfryd Kosicki (July 1933 – November 1934)
- (Austria) Adolf Riebe (March 1935 – November 1937)
- (Hungary) Károly Fogl (April 1938 – June 1939)
- (Poland) Fryderyk Scherfke (August 1939)
- (Poland) Mieczysław Balcer (? – November 1946)
- (Poland) Kazimierz Śmiglak (March 1947 - May 1947)
- (Hungary) Károly Fogl (May 1947 - April 1948)
- (Poland) Kazimierz Śmiglak (May 1948 – July 1948)
- (Czech Republic) Václav Křížek (July 1948 – April 1949)
- (Poland) Kazimierz Śmiglak (April 1949 – November 1949)
- (Hungary) Károly Fogl (February 1950 – 1951)
- (Poland) Edward Nowicki (1952 – ?)
- (Poland) Michał Matyas (1955 – November 1956)
- (Hungary) László Fenyvesi (March 1957 – June 1958)
- (Poland) Edward Nowicki (June 1958 – November 1959)
- (Poland) Stanisław Kaźmierczak (February 1960 – November 1960)
- (Poland) Jerzy Godek (? – June 1971)
- (Poland) Stefan Żywotko (? – June 1974)
- (Poland) Tadeusz Błażejewski (June 1974 – December 1974)
- (Poland) Zbigniew Kazmucha (January 1975 – June 1975)
- (Poland) Bogdan Dzięgielewski (July 1975 – December 1976)
- (Poland) Roman Komasa (January 1977 – May 1979)
- (Poland) Tadeusz Łuczak (May 1979 – ?)
- (Poland) Jan Stępczak (July 1983 – January 1984)
- (Poland) Andrzej Żurawski (? – September 1991)
- (United States) Andreas Mparmperis (October 1991 – November 1991)
- (Poland) Wojciech Wąsikiewicz (February 1992 – June 1993)
- (Poland) Eugeniusz Samolczyk (July 1993 – April 1994)
- (Poland) Tadeusz Łuczak (May 1994 – June 1994)
- (Poland) Wojciech Wąsikiewicz (July 1994 – September 1994)
- (Poland) Krzysztof Pawlak (October 1994 – September 1995)
- (Poland) Marek Giese and Mirosław Myśliński (September 1995)
- (Poland) Włodzimierz Jakubowski (September 1995 – April 1996)
- (Poland) Andrzej Żurawski (May 1996 – ?)
- (Poland) Mariusz Niewiadomski (? – October 1997)
- (Poland) Andrzej Żurawski (November 1997 – March 1999)
- (Poland) Jarosław Szuba (March 1999 – June 1999)
- (Poland) Tomasz Wichniarek (June 1999 – August 1999)
- (Poland) Antoni Pluskota (August 1999 – September 1999)
- (Poland) Tadeusz Łuczak (January 2000 – July 2001)
- (Poland) Wojciech Wąsikiewicz (July 2001 – July 2002)
- (Poland) Krzysztof Pancewicz (July 2002 – June 2003)
- (Poland) Wojciech Wąsikiewicz (June 2003 – June 2004)
- (Poland) Jarosław Araszkiewicz (July 2004 – April 2007)
- (Poland) Ryszard Łukasik (April 2007 – September 2007)
- (Poland) Bogusław Baniak (September 2007 – December 2009)
- (Poland) Marek Czerniawski (December 2009 – October 2010)
- (Poland) Ryszard Łukasik (October 2010 – December 2010)
- (Poland) Bogusław Baniak (January 2011 – June 2011)
- (Poland) Czesław Jakołcewicz (June 2011 – August 2011)
- (Poland) Artur Płatek (August 2011 – November 2011)
- (Poland) Jarosław Araszkiewicz (November 2011 – April 2012)
- (Poland) Czesław Owczarek (April 2012 – August 2012)
- (Poland) Ryszard Łukasik (August 2012)
- (Poland) Czesław Owczarek (August 2012 – December 2012)
- (Poland) Waldemar Przysiuda (January 2013)
- (Poland) Maciej Borowski (January 2013 – April 2013)
- (Poland) Krzysztof Pawlak (April 2013 – June 2013)
- (Poland) Marek Kamiński (June 2013 – March 2014)
- (Poland) Piotr Kowal (March 2014)
- (Poland) Tomasz Bekas (July 2014 – November 2016)
- (Czech Republic) Petr Němec (November 2016 – May 2019)
- (Poland) Piotr Tworek (June 2019 – November 2021)
- (Poland) Adam Szała (caretaker) (November 2021)
- (Poland) Dawid Szulczek (November 2021 – June 2024)
- (Poland) Piotr Jacek (July 2024 – August 2024)
- (Poland) Daniel Ledzion & Jędrzej Łągiewka (caretakers) (August 2024)
- (Poland) Piotr Klepczarek (August 2024 – March 2025)
- (Poland) Ryszard Tarasiewicz (March 2025 – June 2025)
- (Poland) Maciej Tokarczyk (June 2025 – current)

== See also ==
- Football in Poland
