= Marian Einbacher =

Polish footballer (1900–1943)

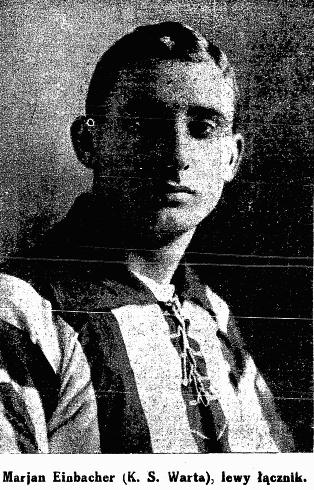

Personal information
- Date of birth: 8 January 1900
- Place of birth: Poznań, German Empire
- Date of death: 12 January 1943 (aged 43)
- Place of death: Auschwitz concentration camp, German-occupied Poland
- Position: Forward

Senior career*
Years	Team	Apps	(Gls)
1913–1925	Warta Poznań		

International career
1921	Poland	1	(0)
- * Club domestic league appearances and goals

Marian Einbacher (8 January 1900 – 12 January 1943) was a Polish footballer who played as a forward.

He made one appearance for the Poland national team in 1921. A Jew, he was killed in the Auschwitz concentration camp during World War II.
