= Piotr Klepczarek (footballer, born 1984) =

Polish footballer

Personal information
- Date of birth: 12 July 1984 (age 42)
- Place of birth: Olsztyn, Poland
- Height: 1.80 m (5 ft 11 in)
- Position: Centre back

Team information
- Current team: Poland U16 (manager)

Senior career*
Years	Team	Apps	(Gls)
2001	Stomil Olsztyn II		
2002–2003	Stomil Olsztyn	26	(0)
2003–2004	MKS Mława		
2004–2005	Kujawiak Włocławek	24	(0)
2005–2006	Zawisza Bydgoszcz	28	(1)
2007–2008	Polonia Warsaw	26	(0)
2008	Polonia Warsaw II		
2009–2010	Znicz Pruszków	48	(0)
2010–2012	ŁKS Łódź	51	(0)
2012–2016	Dolcan Ząbki	106	(1)
2016–2017	Stomil Olsztyn	33	(0)
2017–2018	Znicz Pruszków	49	(2)

International career
- Poland U17
2006	Poland U21	1	(0)

Managerial career
- 2021: Stomil Olsztyn
- 2021–2022: Unia Janikowo
- 2022–2024: Świt Szczecin
- 2024–2025: Warta Poznań
- 2026: Poland U15
- 2026–: Poland U16
- * Club domestic league appearances and goals

Piotr Klepczarek (born 12 July 1984) is a Polish professional football manager and former player. He currently serves as the manager of the Poland national under-16 team.

== Career ==
In June 2010, he joined ŁKS Łódź on a two-year contract.

== Coaching career ==
Klepczarek retired at the end of 2018 to accept a job offer as assistant manager for Poland U20. In August 2019, he was hired as a video analyst for the first team and individual coach for the youth teams of Stomil Olsztyn.

In December 2022, he was appointed manager of III liga, group II club Świt Szczecin. In his second season in charge, Świt dominated their group and won their first-ever promotion to the third tier in May 2024, with four league games to go.

On 27 August 2024, after leaving Świt by mutual consent, Klepczarek replaced Piotr Jacek at the helm of I liga club Warta Poznań, signing a deal until the end of the season, with an option for additional two years. On 10 March 2025, he was dismissed.

On 1 April 2026, Klepczak took charge of the Poland national under-15 team, replacing Dariusz Gęsior.

== Managerial statistics ==
As of match played 4 October 2026

Managerial record by team and tenure
Team	From	To	Record							
Team	From	To	G	W	D	L	GF	GA	GD	Win %
Stomil Olsztyn	6 April 2021	24 June 2021	11	3	3	5	10	13	−3	27.27
Unia Janikowo	9 September 2021	26 March 2022	17	13	2	2	48	23	+25	76.47
Świt Szczecin	16 December 2022	27 August 2024	65	41	12	12	134	55	+79	63.08
Warta Poznań	27 August 2024	10 March 2025	18	5	4	9	12	25	−13	27.78
Poland U15	1 April 2026	23 June 2026	5	2	3	0	12	7	+5	40.00
Poland U16	23 June 2026	Present	4	2	1	1	5	6	−1	50.00
Career total			120	66	25	29	221	129	+92	55.00

== Honours ==
=== Player ===
ŁKS Łódź

- I liga: 2010–11

=== Manager ===
Świt Szczecin

- III liga, group II: 2023–24
- Polish Cup (West Pomerania regionals): 2023–24
