= Wojciech Wąsikiewicz =

Polish football player and manager

Personal information
- Date of birth: 15 July 1946
- Place of birth: Poznań, Poland
- Date of death: 4 March 2015 (aged 68)
- Place of death: Poznań, Poland

Senior career*
Years	Team	Apps	(Gls)
1956–1970	Olimpia Poznań		

Managerial career
- Admira Poznań
- Grunwald Poznań
- Olimpia Poznań
- Victoria Jarocin
- 1985–1990: Dyskobolia Grodzisk Wielkopolski
- 1992–1993: Warta Poznań
- 1993–1994: Sokół Pniewy
- 1994: Warta Poznań
- 1995: Petrochemia Płock (assistant)
- 1995–1996: Lechia/Olimpia Gdańsk (assistant)
- 1997–1998: Amica Wronki
- 1998–1999: Aluminium Konin
- 2000: Lech Poznań
- 2000: Górnik Łęczna
- 2001–2002: Warta Poznań
- 2003–2004: Warta Poznań
- 2004: Arka Gdynia
- 2005–2006: Arka Gdynia
- 2006–2007: Unia Janikowo (coach coordinator)
- 2006–2007: Piast Choszczno (coach coordinator)
- 2008–2009: Concordia Murowana Goślina
- 2010–2011: Polonia Słubice
- 2011: Tur Turek (assistant)
- 2011: Tur Turek
- * Club domestic league appearances and goals

Wojciech Wąsikiewicz (15 July 1946 – 4 March 2015) was a Polish football manager and player.

== Honours ==
Warta Poznań

- II liga, group I: 1992–93

Amica Wronki

- Polish Cup: 1997–98
- Polish Super Cup: 1998
