= Michał Flieger =

Polish footballer

Personal information
- Date of birth: 8 September 1900
- Place of birth: Piaski, German Empire
- Date of death: 4 June 1959 (aged 58)
- Place of death: Poznań, Poland
- Position: Left-back

Senior career*
Years	Team	Apps	(Gls)
1918–1920	Goplania Inowrocław		
1921–1923	WKS 3 pl Poznań		
1922–1923	KS Posnania		
1924–1935	Warta Poznań		

International career
1926	Poland	1	(0)
- * Club domestic league appearances and goals

Michał Flieger (8 September 1900 – 4 June 1959) was a Polish footballer who played as a left-back.

He made one appearance for the Poland national team, in a 7–1 win over Finland at Warta's stadium on 8 August 1926.

== Honours ==
Warta Poznań

- Ekstraklasa: 1929
