= Tomasz Bekas =

Polish footballer and coach (born 1975)

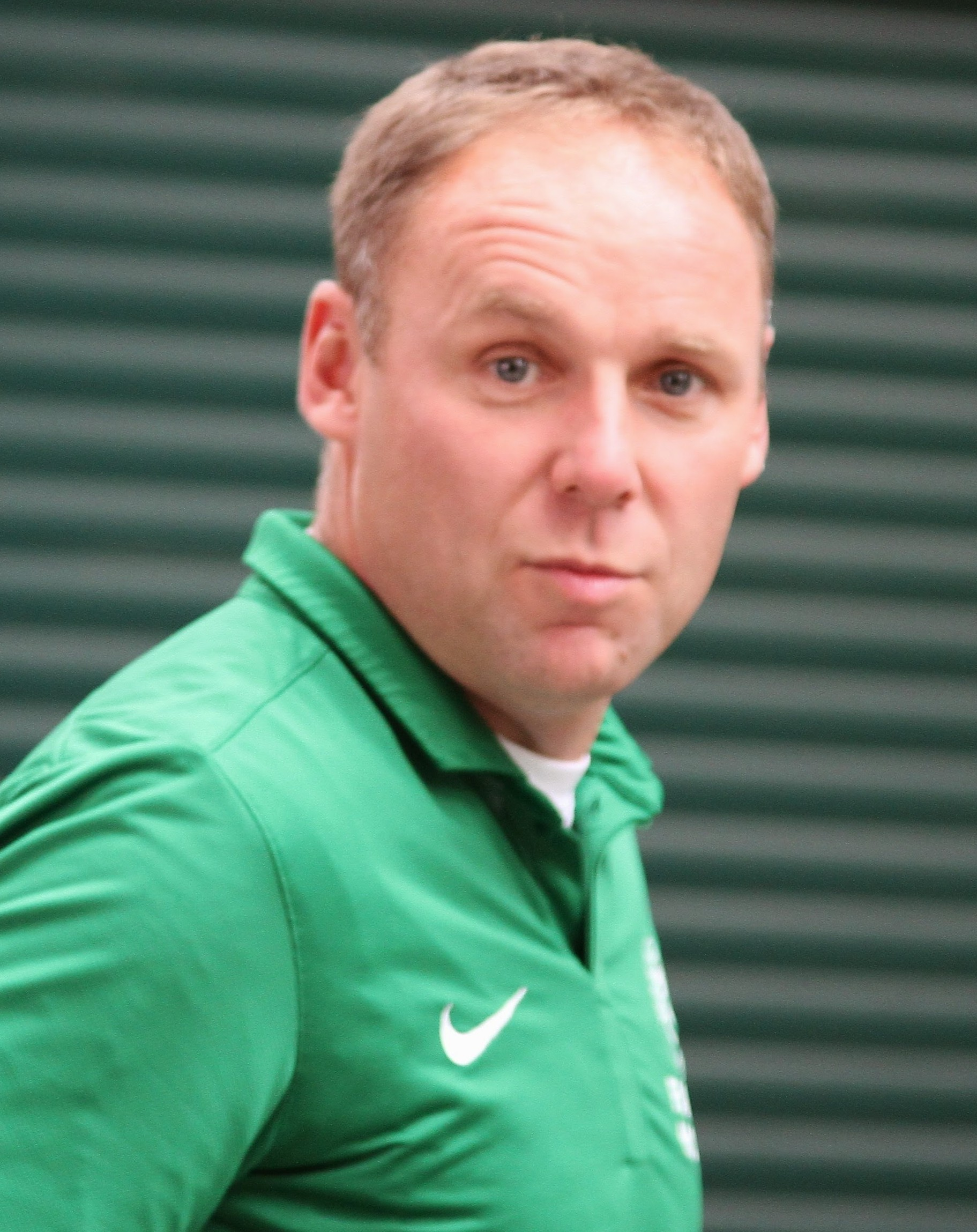

Personal information
- Full name: Tomasz Bekas
- Date of birth: 17 June 1975 (age 51)
- Place of birth: Poznań, Poland
- Height: 1.78 m (5 ft 10 in)
- Position: Central midfielder

Team information
- Current team: Piast Kobylnica (manager)

Youth career
- Lech Poznań
- SKS 13 Poznań

Senior career*
| Years | Team | Apps | (Gls) |
| 1995–1997 | Lech Poznań | 37 | (4) |
| 1998 | Lechia Zielona Góra | | |
| 1998 | Obra Kościan | | |
| 1999 | Pogoń Świebodzin | | |
| 2000–2003 | Lech Poznań | | |
| 2002–2003 | Lech Poznań II | | |
| 2003–2004 | Aluminium Konin | 32 | (2) |
| 2004–2005 | Kujawiak Włocławek | 32 | (1) |
| 2005–2006 | Zawisza Bydgoszcz | 51 | (5) |
| 2007 | Unia Janikowo | 29 | (8) |
| 2008–2010 | Warta Poznań | 75 | (6) |
| 2010 | Wisła Płock | 16 | (3) |
| 2010–2013 | Polonia Środa Wielkopolska | 57 | (9) |

Managerial career
- 2013–2014: Wełna Skoki
- 2014–2016: Warta Poznań
- –2017: Wełna Skoki
- 2017–2018: Sokół Kleczew
- 2018–2021: Victoria Września
- 2021–2024: Unia Swarzędz
- 2025–: Piast Kobylnica
- * Club domestic league appearances and goals

Tomasz Bekas (born 17 June 1975) is a Polish professional football manager and former player who played as a central midfielder. He is currently in charge of IV liga Greater Poland club Piast Kobylnica.

== Managerial statistics ==
As of match played 23 November 2024

Managerial record by team and tenure
| Team | From | To | Record | | | | | | | |
| Team | From | To | G | W | D | L | GF | GA | GD | Win % |
|---|---|---|---|---|---|---|---|---|---|---|
| Warta Poznań | 9 July 2014 | 5 November 2016 | 95 | 53 | 21 | 21 | 180 | 103 | +77 | 55.79 |
| Sokół Kleczew | 2 July 2017 | 4 June 2018 | 39 | 21 | 8 | 10 | 80 | 36 | +44 | 53.85 |
| Victoria Września | 3 September 2018 | 30 June 2021 | 87 | 44 | 17 | 26 | 175 | 112 | +63 | 50.57 |
| Unia Swarzędz | 12 July 2021 | 16 December 2024 | 134 | 71 | 25 | 38 | 251 | 157 | +94 | 52.99 |
| Piast Kobylnica | 22 May 2026 | Present | 39 | 18 | 8 | 13 | 73 | 65 | +8 | 46.15 |
| Total | | | 394 | 207 | 79 | 108 | 759 | 473 | +286 | 52.54 |

== Honours ==
=== Player ===
Lech Poznań

- II liga: 2001–02

Polonia Środa Wielkopolska

- IV liga Greater Poland North: 2010–11

=== Manager ===
Wełna Skoki

- Regional league Piła: 2013–14, 2016–17 (South)

Warta Poznań

- III liga Kuyavia-Pomerania–Greater Poland: 2014–15, 2015–16

Sokół Kleczew

- Polish Cup (Konin regionals): 2017–18

Unia Swarzędz

- IV liga Greater Poland: 2021–22
- Polish Cup (Greater Poland regionals): 2023–24
