= The Best FIFA Football Awards 2022 =

International football awards

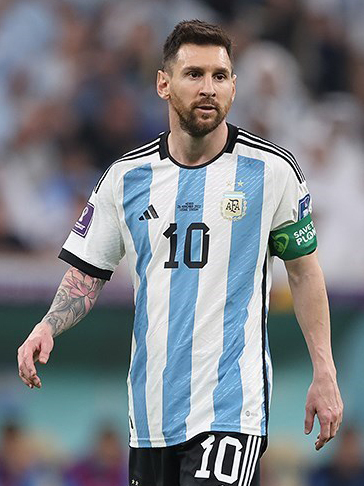
- Lionel Messi, The Best FIFA Men's Player 2022
- Date: 27 February 2023
- Location: Paris, France
- Presented by: FIFA
- Hosted by: Samantha Johnson and Jermaine Jenas

Highlights
- The Best FIFA Player: Men's: (Argentina) Lionel Messi; Women's: (Spain) Alexia Putellas
- The Best FIFA Coach: Men's: (Argentina) Lionel Scaloni; Women's: (Netherlands) Sarina Wiegman
- The Best FIFA Goalkeeper: Men's: (Argentina) Emiliano Martinez; Women's: (England) Mary Earps
- FIFA Puskás Award: (Poland) Marcin Oleksy
- The Best FIFA Special Award: (Brazil) Pelé
- Website: fifa.com

The Best FIFA Football Awards 2022 were held on 27 February 2023 in Paris, France.

== Winners and nominees ==
=== The Best FIFA Men's Player ===
Fourteen players were initially shortlisted on 12 January 2023. The three finalists were revealed on 10 February 2023.

Lionel Messi won the award with 52 scoring points.

The selection criteria for the men's players of the year was: respective achievements during the period from 8 August 2021 to 18 December 2022.

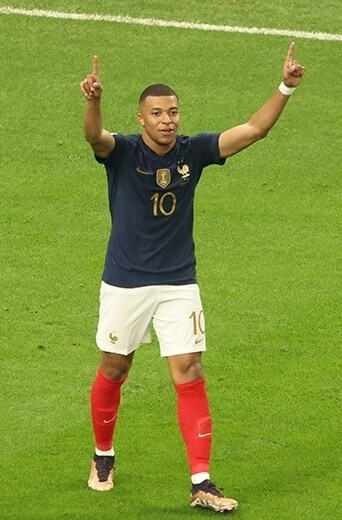
Kylian Mbappé

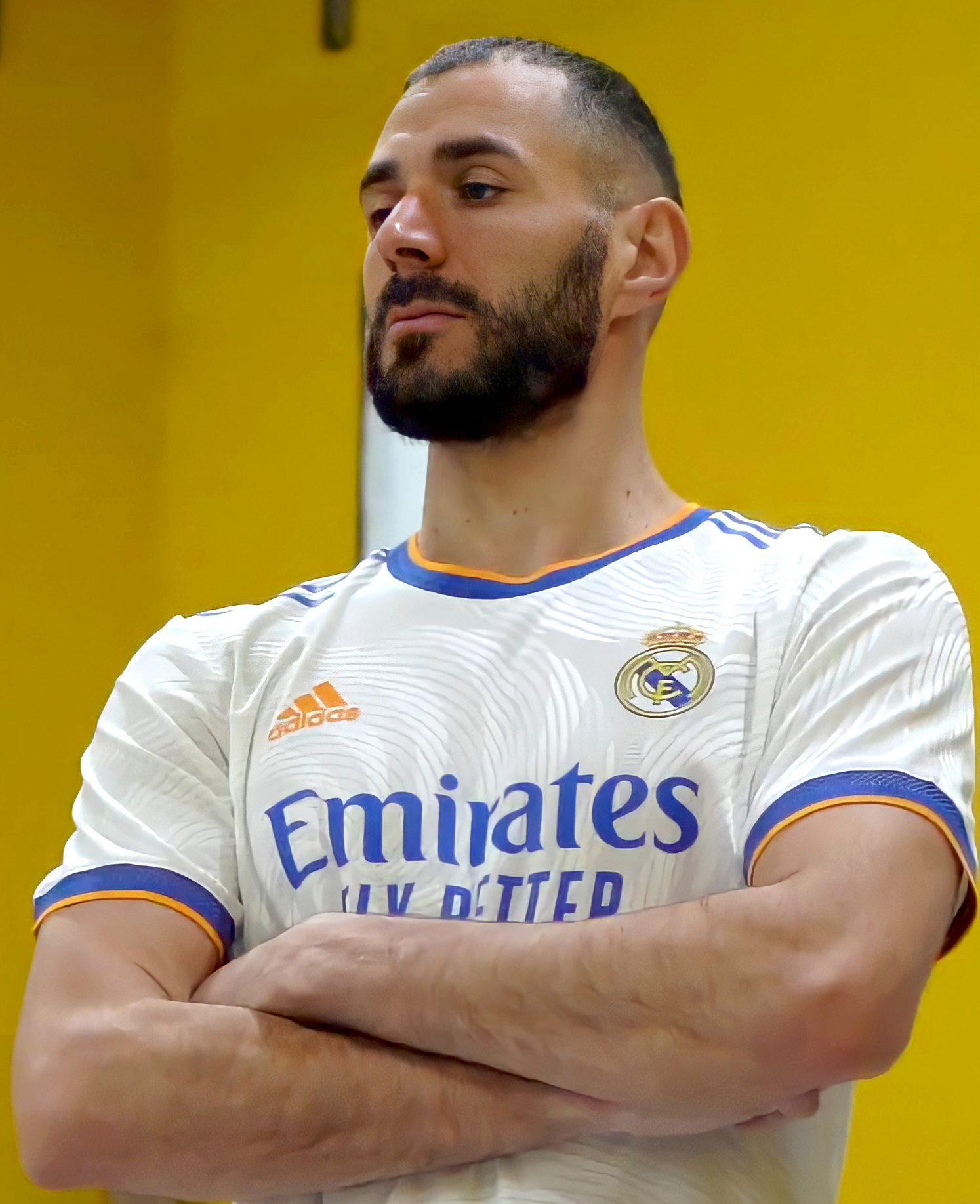
Karim Benzema

Rank	Player	Club(s) played for	National team	Points
The finalists
1	Lionel Messi	(France) Paris Saint-Germain	Argentina	52
2	Kylian Mbappé	(France) Paris Saint-Germain	France	44
3	Karim Benzema	(Spain) Real Madrid	France	34
Other candidates
4	Luka Modrić	(Spain) Real Madrid	Croatia	28
5	Erling Haaland	(Germany) Borussia Dortmund; (England) Manchester City	Norway	24
6	Sadio Mané	(England) Liverpool; (Germany) Bayern Munich	Senegal	19
7	Julián Álvarez	(Argentina) River Plate; (England) Manchester City	Argentina	17
8	Achraf Hakimi	(France) Paris Saint-Germain	Morocco	15
9	Neymar	(France) Paris Saint-Germain	Brazil	13
10	Kevin De Bruyne	(England) Manchester City	Belgium	10
11	Vinícius Júnior	(Spain) Real Madrid	Brazil	10
12	Robert Lewandowski	(Germany) Bayern Munich; (Spain) Barcelona	Poland	7
13	Jude Bellingham	(Germany) Borussia Dortmund	England	3
14	Mohamed Salah	(England) Liverpool	Egypt	2

=== The Best FIFA Men's Goalkeeper ===
Five players were initially shortlisted on 12 January 2023. The three finalists were revealed on 8 February 2023.

Emiliano Martínez won the award with 26 ranking points.

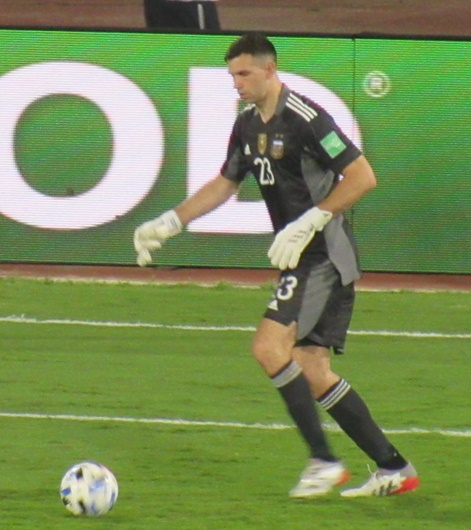
Emiliano Martínez

Rank	Player	Club(s) played for	National team	Points
The finalists
1	Emiliano Martínez	(England) Aston Villa	Argentina	26
2	Thibaut Courtois	(Spain) Real Madrid	Belgium	20
3	Yassine Bounou	(Spain) Sevilla	Morocco	14
Other candidates
4	Alisson	(England) Liverpool	Brazil	8
5	Ederson	(England) Manchester City	Brazil	4

=== The Best FIFA Men's Coach ===
Five coaches were initially shortlisted on 12 January 2023. The three finalists were revealed on 9 February 2023.

Lionel Scaloni won the award with 28 scoring points.

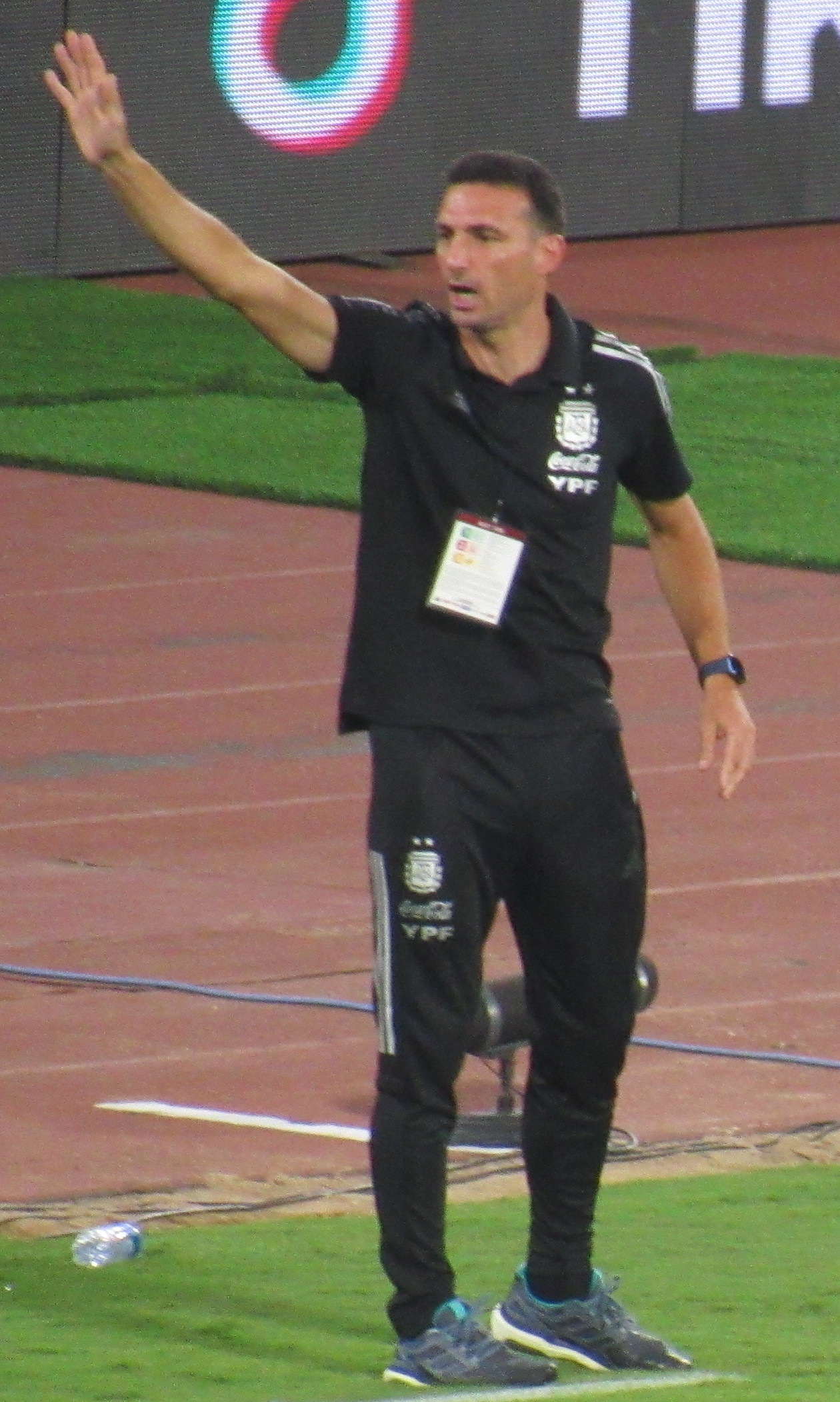
Lionel Scaloni

Rank	Coach	Team(s) managed	Points
The finalists
1	(Argentina) Lionel Scaloni	Argentina	28
2	(Italy) Carlo Ancelotti	(Spain) Real Madrid	17
3	(Spain) Pep Guardiola	(England) Manchester City	12
Other candidates
4	(Morocco) Walid Regragui	(Morocco) Wydad AC; Morocco	10
5	(France) Didier Deschamps	France	5

=== The Best FIFA Women's Player ===
Fourteen players were initially shortlisted on 12 January 2023. The three finalists were revealed on 10 February 2023.

Alexia Putellas won the award with 50 scoring points, her second consecutive win.

The selection criteria for the women's players of the year was: respective achievements during the period from 7 August 2021 to 31 July 2022.

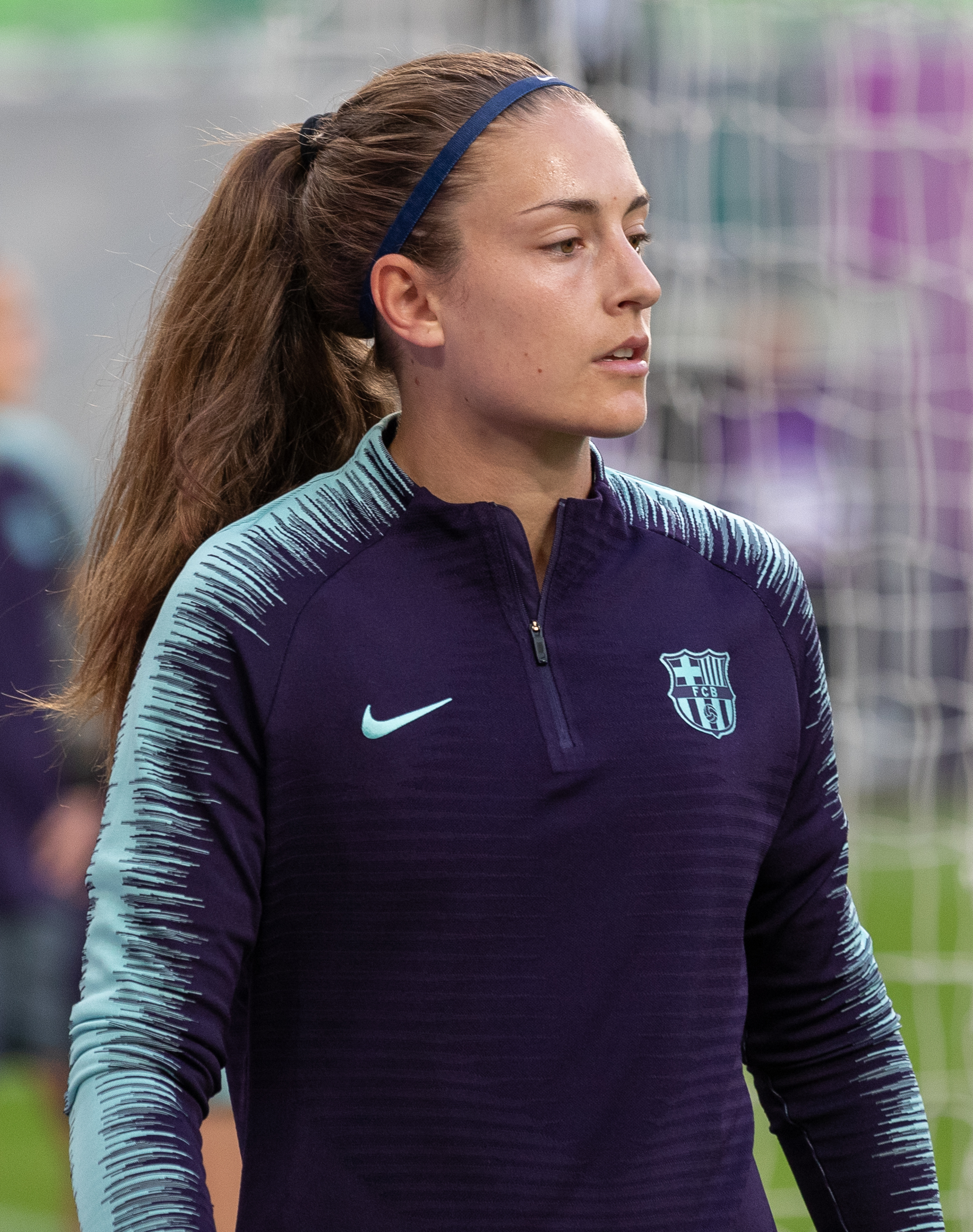
Alexia Putellas

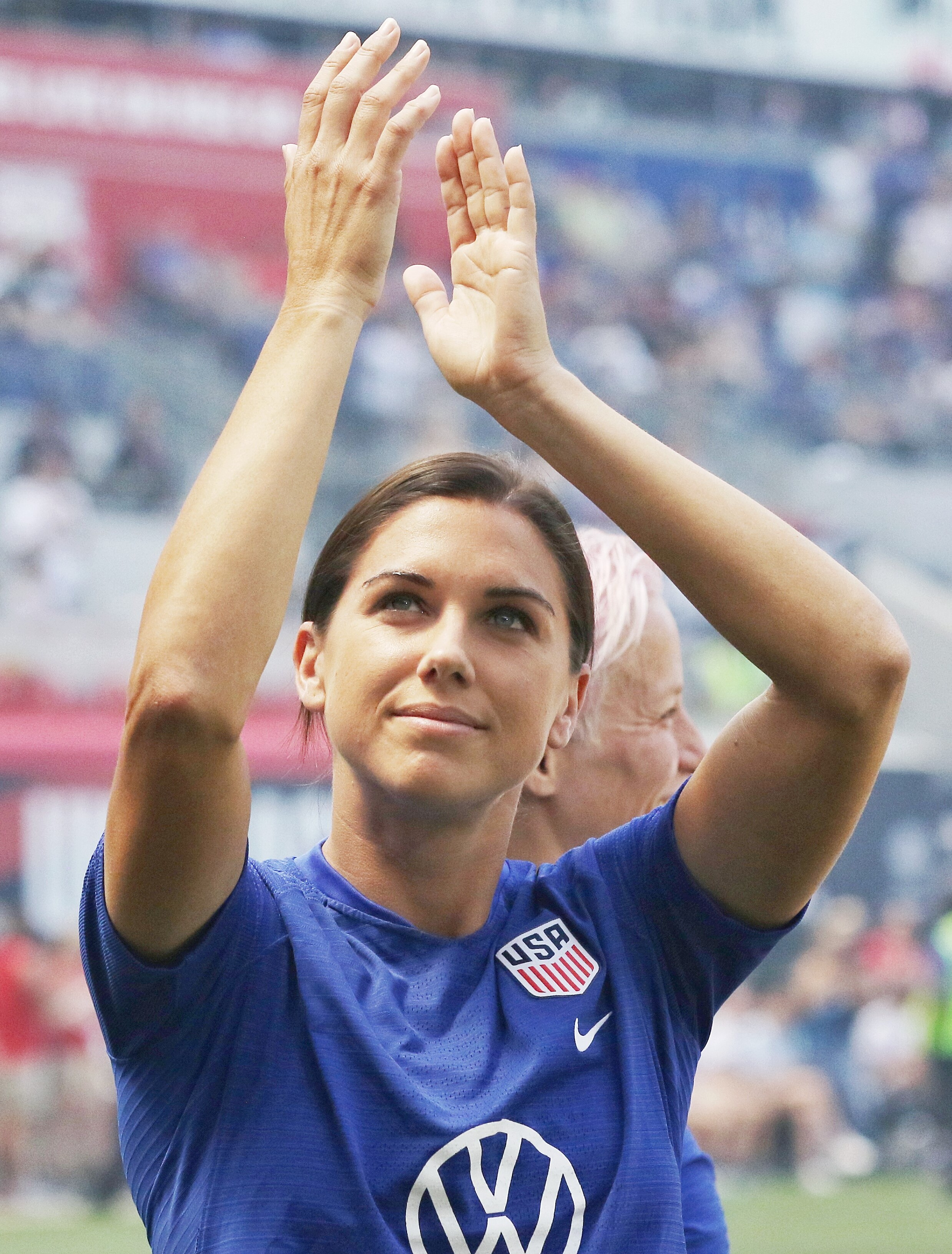
Alex Morgan

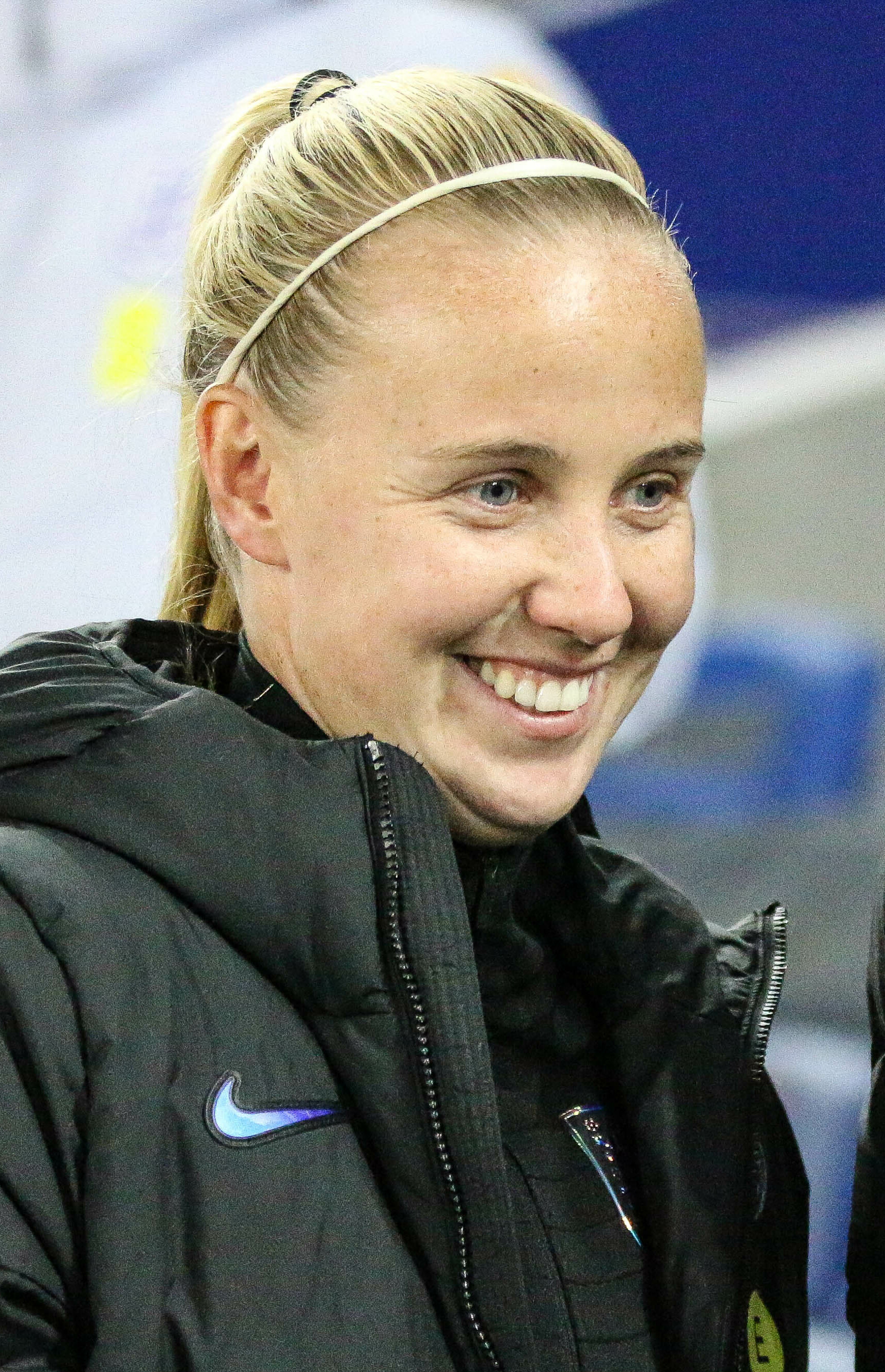
Beth Mead

Rank	Player	Club(s) played for	National team	Points
The finalists
1	Alexia Putellas	(Spain) Barcelona	Spain	50
2	Alex Morgan	(United States) Orlando Pride; (United States) San Diego Wave	United States	37
3	Beth Mead	(England) Arsenal	England	37
Other candidates
4	Sam Kerr	(England) Chelsea	Australia	34
5	Aitana Bonmatí	(Spain) Barcelona	Spain	29
6	Debinha	(United States) North Carolina Courage	Brazil	25
7	Alexandra Popp	(Germany) VfL Wolfsburg	Germany	17
8	Leah Williamson	(England) Arsenal	England	17
9	Ada Hegerberg	(France) Lyon	Norway	13
10	Wendie Renard	(France) Lyon	France	9
11	Lena Oberdorf	(Germany) VfL Wolfsburg	Germany	4
12	Vivianne Miedema	(England) Arsenal	Netherlands	2
13	Keira Walsh	(England) Manchester City; (Spain) Barcelona	England	0
14	Jessie Fleming	(England) Chelsea	Canada	0

=== The Best FIFA Women's Goalkeeper ===
Six players were initially shortlisted on 12 January 2023. The three finalists were revealed on 8 February 2023.

Mary Earps won the award with 26 scoring points.

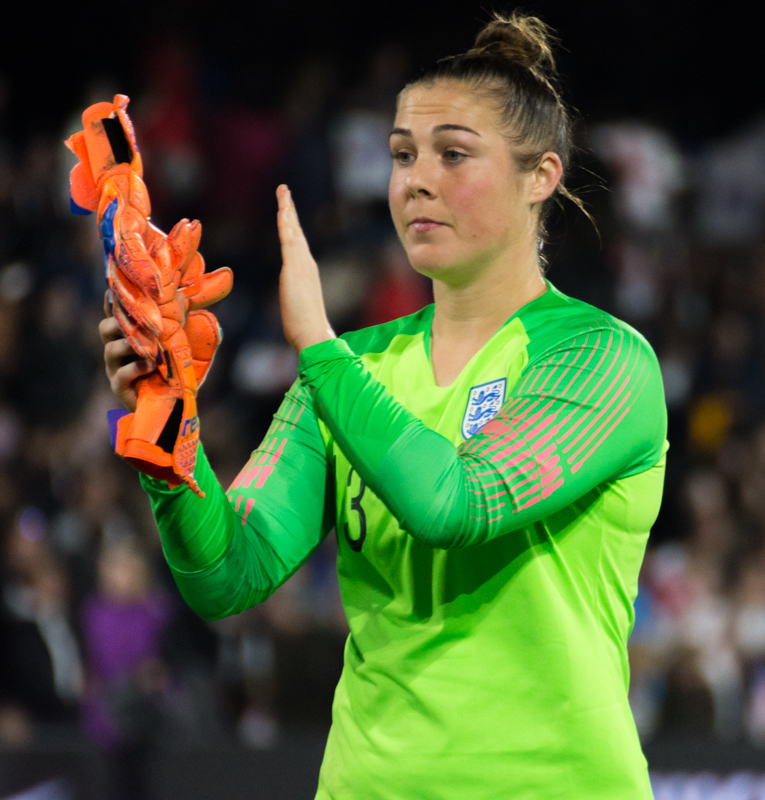
Mary Earps

Rank	Player	Club(s) played for	National team	Points
The finalists
1	Mary Earps	(England) Manchester United	England	26
2	Christiane Endler	(France) Lyon	Chile	22
3	Ann-Katrin Berger	(England) Chelsea	Germany	10
Other candidates
4	Sandra Paños	(Spain) Barcelona	Spain	7
5	Merle Frohms	(Germany) Eintracht Frankfurt; (Germany) VfL Wolfsburg	Germany	5
6	Alyssa Naeher	(United States) Chicago Red Stars	United States	3

=== The Best FIFA Women's Coach ===
Six coaches were initially shortlisted on 12 January 2023. The three finalists were revealed on 9 February 2023.

Sarina Wiegman won the award with 28 scoring points.

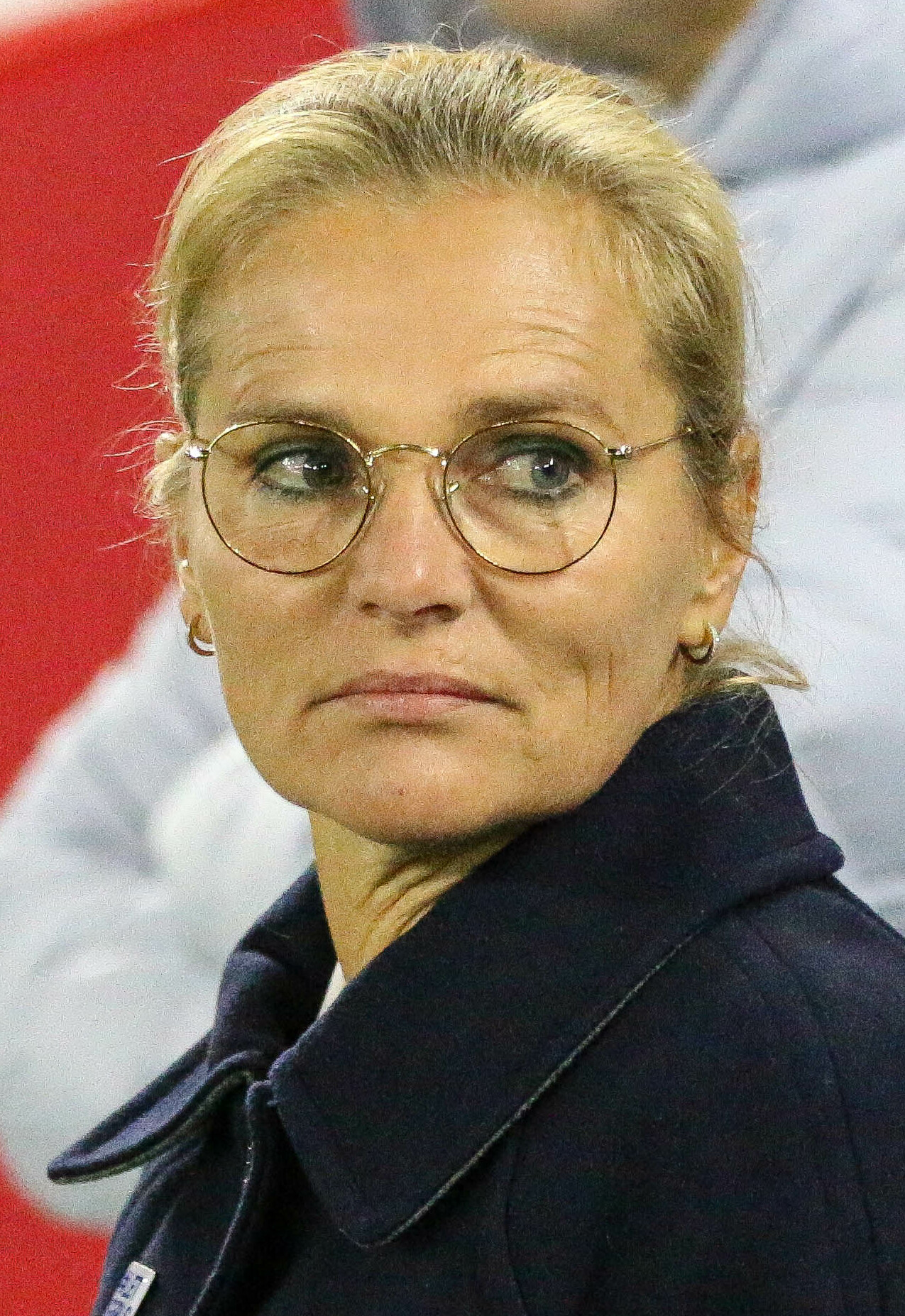
Sarina Wiegman

Rank	Coach	Team(s) managed	Points
The finalists
1	(Netherlands) Sarina Wiegman	England	28
2	(France) Sonia Bompastor	(France) Lyon	18
3	(Sweden) Pia Sundhage	Brazil	10
Other candidates
4	(England) Emma Hayes	(England) Chelsea	10
5	(Germany) Martina Voss-Tecklenburg	Germany	6
6	(England) Bev Priestman	Canada	0

=== FIFA Puskás Award ===
The eleven players initially shortlisted for the award were announced on 12 January 2023. The three finalists were revealed on 10 February 2023. All goals up for consideration were scored from 8 August 2021 to 18 December 2022. Every registered FIFA.com user was allowed to participate in the final vote until 3 February 2023, with the questionnaire being presented on the official website of FIFA. The selected goals were also voted on by a panel of "FIFA experts". Both groups' votes weighed equally on the ultimate winner of the award.

Marcin Oleksy won the award with 21 scoring points, becoming the first amputee footballer to earn the honour.

Rank	Player	Match	Competition	Date	Points
The finalists
1	(Poland) Marcin Oleksy	Warta Poznań – Stal Rzeszów	2022 PZU Amp Futbol Ekstraklasa	6 November 2022	21
2	(France) Dimitri Payet	Marseille – PAOK	2021–22 UEFA Europa Conference League	7 April 2022	20
3	(Brazil) Richarlison	Brazil – Serbia	2022 FIFA World Cup	24 November 2022	17
Other candidates
Unranked	(Italy) Mario Balotelli	Adana Demirspor – Göztepe	2021–22 Süper Lig	22 May 2022	N/A
Unranked	(Argentina) Francisco González Metilli	Rosario Central – Central Córdoba	2022 Argentine Primera División	1 August 2022	N/A
Unranked	(France) Amandine Henry	Barcelona – Lyon	2021–22 UEFA Women's Champions League	21 May 2022	N/A
Unranked	(France) Théo Hernandez	Milan – Atalanta	2021–22 Serie A	15 May 2022	N/A
Unranked	(Australia) Alou Kuol	Iraq – Australia	2022 AFC U-23 Asian Cup	4 June 2022	N/A
Unranked	(France) Kylian Mbappé	Argentina – France	2022 FIFA World Cup	18 December 2022	N/A
Unranked	(Spain) Salma Paralluelo	Barcelona – Villarreal	2021–22 Primera División (women)	2 April 2022	N/A
Unranked	(England) Alessia Russo	England – Sweden	UEFA Women's Euro 2022	26 July 2022	N/A

=== FIFA Fan Award ===
The award celebrates the best fan moments or gestures of August 2021 to December 2022, regardless of championship, gender or nationality. The shortlist was compiled by a panel of FIFA experts.

Argentina fans won the award with over 650,000 registered votes.

Rank	Fan(s)	Reason	Votes	% of total votes
Nominees
1	Argentina fans	Their support in travelling to Qatar to support their teams eventual winning run at the 2022 FIFA World Cup, and followed by the millions of fans welcoming the team home to Buenos Aires following their tournament win.	656,253	41.88%
2	Japan fans	Traditional nature of staying behind following their nation’s games at the 2022 FIFA World Cup to clean up the stadium.	526,887	33.63%
3	(Saudi Arabia) Abdullah Al Salmi	Hiking 1,600 km across the Arabian desert from Jeddah to Qatar to support his home nation at the 2022 FIFA World Cup.	383,643	24.49%

=== FIFA Fair Play Award ===
Winner	Team	Reason
(Georgia (country)) Luka Lochoshvili	(Austria) Wolfsberger AC	Saved Georg Teigl's life, clearing the defender’s airways after he swallowed his tongue. Thanks to Lochoshvili's actions, Teigl regained consciousness and then was treated at a local hospital.

=== The Best FIFA Special Award ===
An additional award was given out posthumously in tribute to the late Pelé, to recognize his role and contribution to the sport of football. The award was received by Pelé's wife Marcia Aoki.

Winner	Reason
(Brazil) Pelé	Posthumously awarded as a tribute and special recognition for his role in football.

=== FIFA FIFPRO Men's World 11 ===
The 26–player men's shortlist was announced on 13 February 2023.

The players chosen were Thibaut Courtois as goalkeeper, Achraf Hakimi, Virgil van Dijk and João Cancelo as defenders, Kevin De Bruyne, Casemiro and Luka Modrić as midfielders, and Lionel Messi, Karim Benzema, Erling Haaland and Kylian Mbappé as forwards.

2022 FIFA FIFPRO Men's World 11

Player	Club(s)
Goalkeeper
(Belgium) Thibaut Courtois	(Spain) Real Madrid
Defenders
(Portugal) João Cancelo	(England) Manchester City; (Germany) Bayern Munich
(Netherlands) Virgil van Dijk	(England) Liverpool
(Morocco) Achraf Hakimi	(France) Paris Saint-Germain
Midfielders
(Brazil) Casemiro	(Spain) Real Madrid; (England) Manchester United
(Belgium) Kevin De Bruyne	(England) Manchester City
(Croatia) Luka Modrić	(Spain) Real Madrid
Forwards
(France) Karim Benzema	(Spain) Real Madrid
(Norway) Erling Haaland	(Germany) Borussia Dortmund; (England) Manchester City
(France) Kylian Mbappé	(France) Paris Saint-Germain
(Argentina) Lionel Messi	(France) Paris Saint-Germain

Other nominees

Player	Club(s)
Goalkeepers
(Brazil) Alisson	(England) Liverpool
(Argentina) Emiliano Martínez	(England) Aston Villa
Defenders
(Canada) Alphonso Davies	(Germany) Bayern Munich
(Croatia) Joško Gvardiol	(Germany) RB Leipzig
(France) Théo Hernandez	(Italy) Milan
(Germany) Antonio Rüdiger	(England) Chelsea; (Spain) Real Madrid
(Brazil) Thiago Silva	(England) Chelsea
Midfielders
(England) Jude Bellingham	(Germany) Borussia Dortmund
(Argentina) Enzo Fernández	(Argentina) River Plate; (Portugal) Benfica; (England) Chelsea
(Spain) Gavi	(Spain) Barcelona
(Spain) Pedri	(Spain) Barcelona
(Uruguay) Federico Valverde	(Spain) Real Madrid
Forwards
(Poland) Robert Lewandowski	(Germany) Bayern Munich; (Spain) Barcelona
(Brazil) Neymar	(France) Paris Saint-Germain
(Portugal) Cristiano Ronaldo	(England) Manchester United; (Saudi Arabia) Al Nassr

=== FIFA FIFPRO Women's World 11 ===
The 23–player women's shortlist was announced on 13 February 2023.

The players chosen were Christiane Endler as goalkeeper, Lucy Bronze, Mapi León, Wendie Renard and Leah Williamson as defenders, Lena Oberdorf, Alexia Putellas and Keira Walsh as midfielders, and Sam Kerr, Beth Mead and Alex Morgan as forwards.

2022 FIFA FIFPRO Women's World 11

Player	Club(s)
Goalkeeper
(Chile) Christiane Endler	(France) Lyon
Defenders
(England) Lucy Bronze	(England) Manchester City; (Spain) Barcelona
(Spain) Mapi León	(Spain) Barcelona
(France) Wendie Renard	(France) Lyon
(England) Leah Williamson	(England) Arsenal
Midfielders
(Germany) Lena Oberdorf	(Germany) VfL Wolfsburg
(Spain) Alexia Putellas	(Spain) Barcelona
(England) Keira Walsh	(England) Manchester City; (Spain) Barcelona
Forwards
(Australia) Sam Kerr	(England) Chelsea
(England) Beth Mead	(England) Arsenal
(United States) Alex Morgan	(United States) Orlando Pride; (United States) San Diego Wave

Other nominees

Player	Club(s)
Goalkeepers
(England) Mary Earps	(England) Manchester United
(Spain) Sandra Paños	(Spain) Barcelona
Defenders
(Australia) Ellie Carpenter	(France) Lyon
(Canada) Ashley Lawrence	(France) Paris Saint-Germain
(Spain) Irene Paredes	(Spain) Barcelona
Midfielders
(Spain) Aitana Bonmatí	(Spain) Barcelona
(Norway) Caroline Graham Hansen	(Spain) Barcelona
(France) Amandine Henry	(France) Lyon
(United States) Kelley O'Hara	(United States) Washington Spirit; (United States) NJ/NY Gotham
Forwards
(Norway) Ada Hegerberg	(France) Lyon
(Netherlands) Vivianne Miedema	(England) Arsenal
(England) Ellen White	(England) Manchester City
