= Dębińska Road Stadium =

Football stadium in Poznań, Poland

- Stadion przy Drodze Dębińskiej
- Little Garden (Polish: Ogródek)
- Interactive map of Dębińska Road Stadium
- Location: Wilda, Poznań, Poland
- Coordinates: 52°23′37″N 16°55′52″E
- Capacity: 720
- Field size: 105.6m x 68.5m

Construction
- Renovated: 2012; 2013; 2019–2020; 2025
- Expanded: 2012; 2013

Tenants
- Warta Poznań (1998–2019, 2025–); Atena Poznań (1998–2000); Warta Poznań (women) (2000–2002, 2020–2023)

The Dębińska Road Stadium (Polish: Stadion przy Drodze Dębińskiej) and nicknamed Little Garden (Polish: Ogródek), is a football stadium located in the Wilda district of Poznań, Poland. For sponsorship reasons, the venue is also known as Ogródek by TedGifted.com. It is the home ground of I liga club Warta Poznań.

Originally, the stadium was used as a training ground for Warta; after the Edmund Szyc Stadium fell into disrepair in 1998 and was sold in 2001, it became the team's main venue, having been expanded and modernised over the years to suit the team's needs.

Due to not meeting Ekstraklasa and I liga requirements, Warta ceased using the stadium at the end of the 2018–19 season.

After relegation to the third division, Warta returned to the Ogródek during the 2025–26 season. They hosted their first game there in six years on 7 September 2025, a league fixture against Zagłębie Sosnowiec, which they won 1–0.
