= Bolesław Smólski =

Polish footballer

Personal information
- Date of birth: 10 May 1922
- Place of birth: Poznań, Poland
- Date of death: 22 December 1979 (aged 57)
- Place of death: Poznań, Poland
- Height: 1.84 m (6 ft 0 in)
- Position: Winger

Senior career*
Years	Team	Apps	(Gls)
- Polonia Poznań
- Warta Poznań
- Kolejarz Poznań

International career
1947	Poland	1	(0)
- * Club domestic league appearances and goals

Bolesław Smólski (10 May 1922 – 22 December 1979) was a Polish footballer who played as a winger. He played in one match for the Poland national team in 1947.

== Honours ==
Warta Poznań

- Ekstraklasa: 1947
