= Warta Poznań (women's football) =

Polish football club

- Full name: Warta Poznań Spółka Akcyjna
- Nickname(s): Zieloni
- Founded: April 2000; 25 years ago (as Warta Poznań); 2 June 2002; 23 years ago (as SS Atena Poznań); 2020; 5 years ago (refounded)
- Dissolved: 2023
- Ground: Dębińska Road Stadium, Poznań
- 2022–23: III liga, group II, 5th of 11 (withdrew after the season)

Warta Poznań is a women's football club based in Poznań, Poland, the women's section of Warta Poznań. Currently focused on youth development, Warta's first team most recently competed in the second group of the III liga in the 2022–23 season.

The team played its first season in the II liga, achieving promotion to the top tier on its first attempt. During the 2001–02 season, the women's football department separated from Warta and continued as a separate entity under the name Atena Poznań. Atena ended the campaign in third, the highest finish in the club's history. They spent the following four seasons in the top tier and qualified for the then new founded Ekstraliga. The league was too tough for Atena and the team was relegated again after the first season.

The team played another season in the second division, before merging with Poznaniak Poznań in 2007. The team bounced between the second and third tiers, before changing its name to Koziołek Poznań at the start of the 2013–14 campaign, from which they withdrew midway through.

Warta's women's football department was refounded in 2020 after a merger with Lejdis Luboń and registered its under-17 team to play in IV liga. After three years, Warta withdrew from senior competition at the end of the 2022–23 season to focus on its academy.
