= Marian Fontowicz =

Polish association football player (1907-1988)

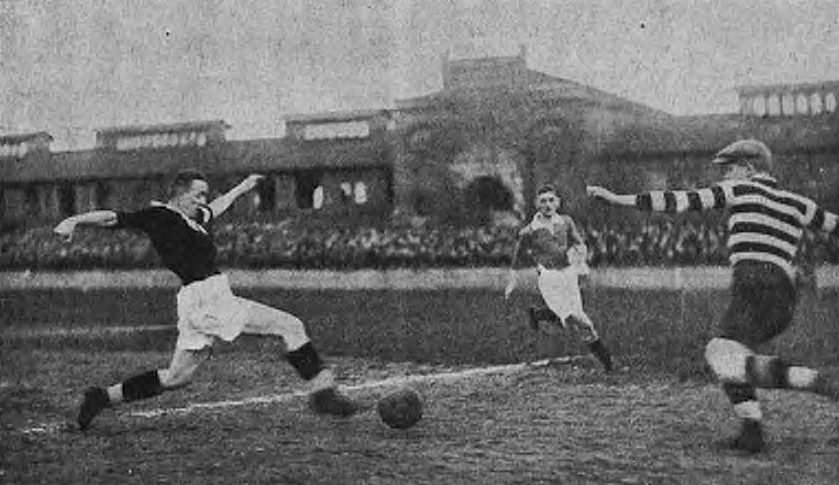
- Fontowicz (right) in a 1927 match against Polonia Warszawa

Personal information
- Date of birth: 13 July 1907
- Place of birth: Poznań, German Empire
- Date of death: 20 November 1988 (aged 81)
- Place of death: Poznań, Poland
- Height: 1.72 m (5 ft 8 in)
- Position: Goalkeeper

Senior career*
Years	Team	Apps	(Gls)
1923–1938	Warta Poznań		
1945	Warta Poznań		

International career
1930–1935	Poland	8	(0)
- * Club domestic league appearances and goals

Marian Fontowicz (13 July 1907 – 20 November 1988) was a Polish footballer who played as goalkeeper. In club football, he played for Warta Poznań from 1923 to 1938.

== Club career ==
He joined Warta Poznań at the age of 15. He made his first team debut in 1924, and made his debut in the championship on 29 March 1925 in a home match against TKS Toruń. His first league appearance came on 3 April 1927 in a home game against Czarni Lwów. His final game was on 24 April 1938 in an away game against Cracovia. He has spent his entire career at Warta Poznań, playing 578 matches for the team. Warta fans called him "King of the foreground". In 1929, he won the Polish title with Warta.

== International career ==
Fontowicz received his first call-up to the Poland national team for the match with Sweden, played on 1 July 1928 in Katowice (2–1); he was then only a backup for Stefan Kisieliński. He appeared in eght friendly matches from 1930 to 1935, in which he conceded 23 goals. He conceded five goals twice. Fontowicz conceded once from a penalty kick in a match against Germany on 9 September 1934, lost by Poland 2–5. He made his international debut on 28 September 1930 in a match against Sweden. His last international play was on 12 May 1935 against Austria. He was a back-up goalkeeper for the Polish Olympic team at the 1936 Summer Olympics.

== Honours ==
Warta Poznań

- Ekstraklasa: 1929
