= 1929 Ekstraklasa =

9th season of top-tier football league in Poland

Liga
- Season: 1929
- Champions: Warta Poznan (1st title)
- Relegated: 1. FC Kattowitz; Klub Turystów Łódź
- Top goalscorer: Rochus Nastula (25 goals)

Statistics of Ekstraklasa for the 1929 season.

== Overview ==
The championship was contested by 13 teams and Warta Poznań won the title.

== League table ==
Pos	Team	Pld	W	D	L	GF	GA	GD	Pts
1	Warta Poznań (C)	24	15	3	6	58	33	+25	33
2	Garbarnia Kraków	24	13	6	5	62	43	+19	32
3	Wisła Kraków	24	13	4	7	62	46	+16	30
4	Legia Warsaw	24	12	6	6	44	34	+10	30
5	ŁKS Łódź	24	11	7	6	41	41	0	29
6	KS Cracovia	24	10	8	6	60	35	+25	28
7	Polonia Warsaw	24	8	4	12	47	57	−10	20
8	Warszawianka Warszawa	24	6	8	10	36	54	−18	20
9	Pogoń Lwów	24	7	5	12	43	48	−5	19
10	Ruch Chorzów	24	6	7	11	32	48	−16	19
11	Czarni Lwów	24	7	4	13	59	63	−4	18
12	1. FC Kattowitz (R)	24	5	7	12	33	51	−18	17
13	Klub Turystów Łódź (R)	24	6	5	13	31	55	−24	17

Source: 90minut.pl (in Polish)
(C) Champions; (R) Relegated

== Results ==
Home \ Away	KAT	CRA	CZA	GAR	KTŁ	LEG	ŁKS	POG	PWA	RUC	WAW	WAR	WIS
1. FC Kattowitz		1–0	0–6	2–4	1–3	1–2	5–2	1–1	4–0	1–1	0–0	1–1	2–4
Cracovia	6–1		8–0	2–2	2–1	3–3	8–0	4–3	5–2	0–3	2–0	5–0	3–1
Czarni Lwów	3–4	2–2		5–3	6–1	1–3	3–3	1–2	6–3	2–5	4–1	1–4	4–0
Garbarnia Kraków	2–2	0–3	3–2		8–2	4–2	1–0	2–2	3–2	1–1	5–0	3–2	1–0
Klub Turystów Łódź	1–2	1–1	1–1	1–3		2–1	0–2	3–1	0–0	3–0	3–0	0–3	0–3
Legia Warsaw	2–0	2–0	4–2	1–1	1–1		0–1	3–2	3–2	1–2	3–1	3–1	1–0
ŁKS Łódź	0–0	2–1	4–2	0–0	2–1	1–1		2–0	4–2	2–1	3–3	0–2	2–2
Pogoń Lwów	1–0	1–1	2–0	3–2	4–3	0–2	1–1		0–2	3–4	0–1	2–3	2–4
Polonia Warsaw	4–1	1–1	2–0	1–3	2–1	2–2	1–2	1–6		3–0	5–1	2–1	3–4
Ruch Chorzów	0–0	0–0	2–4	1–0	0–0	1–2	1–3	1–3	1–2		1–4	2–0	2–2
Warszawianka	4–2	2–2	1–0	3–4	0–2	1–1	2–0	1–1	2–2	2–2		0–4	3–2
Warta Poznań	2–1	2–0	1–0	1–5	7–1	3–1	3–1	3–2	3–1	5–0	2–2		5–0
Wisła Kraków	2–1	5–1	4–4	5–2	5–0	2–0	1–4	3–1	4–2	5–1	4–2	0–0	

Source: 90minut.pl (in Polish)
Legend: Blue = home team win; Yellow = draw; Red = away team win.
