= 1990–91 European Cup =

European football tournament

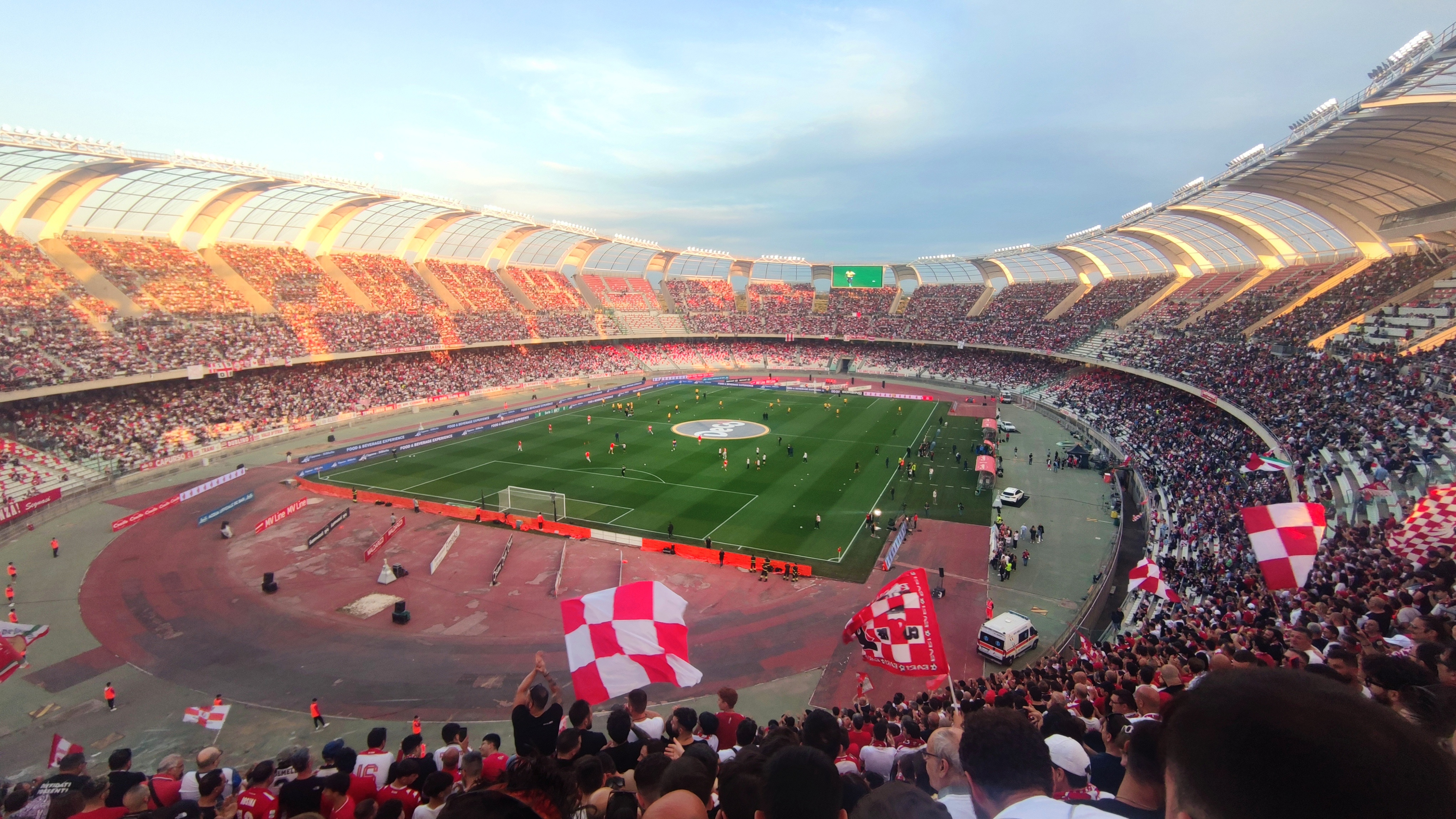
- Stadio San Nicola in Bari hosted the final.

Tournament details
- Dates: 19 September 1990 – 29 May 1991
- Teams: 31

Final positions
- Champions: (Socialist Federal Republic of Yugoslavia) Red Star Belgrade (1st title)
- Runners-up: (France) Marseille

Tournament statistics
- Matches played: 59
- Goals scored: 188 (3.19 per match)
- Attendance: 1,614,372 (27,362 per match)
- Top scorer(s): Peter Pacult (Swarovski Tirol); Jean-Pierre Papin (Marseille); 6 goals each

The 1990–91 European Cup was the 36th season of the European Cup, a tournament for men's football clubs in nations affiliated to the Union of European Football Associations (UEFA). It was won for the first time by Red Star Belgrade on penalties in the final against Marseille; both were first-time finalists. This was only the second time that an Eastern European side had won the competition, after Steaua București of Romania in 1986. It was also the last tournament to be solely knock-out based, with a group stage added for the next season. Red Star won the tournament as the only Yugoslav club shortly before the breakup of Yugoslavia. This was also the last season to feature a team from East Germany, since the East and its West counterpart reunified in October 1990. Although this was the first season which English clubs were readmitted to European competition Liverpool did not compete in the European Cup as English champions due to the last year of their six-year ban.

Milan were eliminated by Marseille in the quarter-finals after the second leg had been awarded as a 3–0 win for Marseille when the eventual runners-up were leading 1–0, and 2–1 on aggregate, in injury time, when the floodlights failed. Milan refused to play on when floodlights were fixed and were banned, giving Marseille a 3–0 automatic win.

== Teams ==
A total of 31 teams participated in the competition. Teams are ordered below by the 1989 UEFA association coefficients.

Although 1990–91 marked the return of English clubs to the Cup Winners' Cup and UEFA Cup, after a five-year ban resulting from the Heysel Stadium disaster, Liverpool had been banned for an additional year, so could not participate in the European Cup as English champions.

Ajax, the Dutch champions, were not allowed to participate in a European Cup competition because of the poor behaviour of their fans during a game the previous season, so their spot in the qualification was simply vacated, giving the two-time defending champions Milan a first-round bye.

Qualified teams for 1990–91 European Cup
Second round
| (Italy) Milan (TH) | | | |
First round
| (Italy) Napoli (1st) | (West Germany) Bayern Munich (1st) | (Spain) Real Madrid (1st) | (Soviet Union) Spartak Moscow (1st) |
| (Belgium) Club Brugge (1st) | (Portugal) Porto (1st) | (Romania) Dinamo București (1st) | (Scotland) Rangers (1st) |
| (Sweden) Malmö FF (1st) | (France) Marseille (1st) | (Socialist Federal Republic of Yugoslavia) Red Star Belgrade (1st) | (Austria) Swarovski Tirol (1st) |
| (East Germany) Dynamo Dresden (1st) | (Czechoslovakia) Sparta Prague (1st) | (Hungary) Újpesti Dózsa (1st) | (Greece) Panathinaikos (1st) |
| (Switzerland) Grasshopper (1st) | (Denmark) OB (1st) | (Finland) Kuusysi (1st) | (Poland) Lech Poznań (1st) |
| (Bulgaria) CSKA Sofia (1st) | (Turkey) Beşiktaş (1st) | (Albania) Dinamo Tirana (1st) | (Norway) Lillestrøm (1st) |
| (Northern Ireland) Portadown (1st) | (Cyprus) APOEL (1st) | (Iceland) KA (1st) | (Republic of Ireland) St Patrick's Athletic (1st) |
| (Malta) Valletta (1st) | Union Luxembourg (1st) | | |

Notes

1. East Germany (GDR): All matches of Dynamo Dresden, who were representing the DFV of East Germany as champions of the 1989–90 DDR-Oberliga, on or after German reunification of 3 October show the flag of the reunited nation of Germany. However, those matches and their records were still counted for East Germany, and not for Germany, under UEFA regulations.

=== Seeding ===
For the first and second round draws, teams were ranked according to their 1990 UEFA club seeding coefficients. The seedings took into account performances in European competitions from 1985–86 to 1989–90, and were calculated by taking the club's total UEFA coefficient points earned divided by total matches played.

- (Italy) Milan (1.464)^{TH}
- (France) Marseille (1.812)
- (West Germany) Bayern Munich (1.615)
- (Spain) Real Madrid (1.475)
- (Portugal) Porto (1.444)
- (Socialist Federal Republic of Yugoslavia) Red Star Belgrade (1.423)
- (East Germany) Dynamo Dresden (1.300)
- (Italy) Napoli (1.272)
- (Romania) Dinamo București (1.200)
- (Scotland) Rangers (1.200)
- (Bulgaria) CSKA Sofia (1.166)
- (Poland) Lech Poznań (1.166)
- (Soviet Union) Spartak Moscow (1.125)
- (Sweden) Malmö FF (1.000)
- (Austria) Swarovski Tirol (1.000)
- (Belgium) Club Brugge (0.958)
- (Czechoslovakia) Sparta Prague (0.928)
- (Finland) Kuusysi (0.916)
- (Greece) Panathinaikos (0.900)
- (Hungary) Újpesti Dózsa (0.833)
- (Albania) Dinamo Tirana (0.800)
- (Switzerland) Grasshopper (0.700)
- (Turkey) Beşiktaş (0.666)
- (Cyprus) APOEL (0.500)
- (Norway) Lillestrøm (0.500)
- Union Luxembourg (0.166)
- (Malta) Valletta (0.000)
- (Iceland) KA (0.000)
- (Denmark) OB (0.000)
- (Northern Ireland) Portadown (0.000)
- (Republic of Ireland) St Patrick's Athletic (0.000)

== Bracket ==
Round of 32
(Cyprus) APOEL | 2 | 0 | 2
(West Germany) Bayern Munich | 3 | 4 | 7
(Iceland) KA | 1 | 0 | 1
(Bulgaria) CSKA Sofia | 0 | 3 | 3
(Romania) Dinamo București | 4 | 1 | 5
(Republic of Ireland) St Patrick's Athletic | 0 | 1 | 1
(Portugal) Porto | 5 | 8 | 13
(Northern Ireland) Portadown | 0 | 1 | 1
(Socialist Federal Republic of Yugoslavia) Red Star Belgrade | 1 | 4 | 5
(Switzerland) Grasshopper | 1 | 1 | 2
(Malta) Valletta | 0 | 0 | 0
(Scotland) Rangers | 4 | 6 | 10
Union Luxembourg | 1 | 0 | 1
(Germany) Dynamo Dresden | 3 | 3 | 6
(Sweden) Malmö FF | 3 | 2 | 5
(Turkey) Beşiktaş | 2 | 2 | 4
(Italy) Napoli | 3 | 2 | 5
(Hungary) Újpesti Dózsa | 0 | 0 | 0
(Czechoslovakia) Sparta Prague | 0 | 0 | 0
(Soviet Union) Spartak Moscow | 2 | 2 | 4
(Denmark) OB | 1 | 0 | 1
(Spain) Real Madrid | 4 | 6 | 10
(Austria) Swarovski Tirol | 5 | 2 | 7
(Finland) Kuusysi | 0 | 1 | 1
(Norway) Lillestrøm | 1 | 0 | 1
(Belgium) Club Brugge | 1 | 2 | 3
(Poland) Lech Poznań | 3 | 2 | 5
(Greece) Panathinaikos | 0 | 1 | 1
(France) Marseille | 5 | 0 | 5
(Albania) Dinamo Tirana | 1 | 0 | 1

Round of 16
(Germany) Bayern Munich | 4 | 3 | 7
(Bulgaria) CSKA Sofia | 0 | 0 | 0
(Romania) Dinamo București | 0 | 0 | 0
(Portugal) Porto | 0 | 4 | 4
(Socialist Federal Republic of Yugoslavia) Red Star Belgrade | 3 | 1 | 4
(Scotland) Rangers | 0 | 1 | 1
(Germany) Dynamo Dresden (p.) | 1 | 1 | 2(5)
(Sweden) Malmö FF | 1 | 1 | 2(4)
(Italy) Napoli | 0 | 0 | 0(3)
(Soviet Union) Spartak Moscow (p.) | 0 | 0 | 0(5)
(Spain) Real Madrid | 9 | 2 | 11
(Austria) Swarovski Tirol | 1 | 2 | 3
(Italy) Milan | 0 | 1 | 1
(Belgium) Club Brugge | 0 | 0 | 0
(Poland) Lech Poznań | 3 | 1 | 4
(France) Marseille | 2 | 6 | 8

Quarter-finals
(Germany) Bayern Munich | 1 | 2 | 3
(Portugal) Porto | 1 | 0 | 1
(Socialist Federal Republic of Yugoslavia) Red Star Belgrade | 3 | 3 | 6
(Germany) Dynamo Dresden | 0 | 0 | 0
(Soviet Union) Spartak Moscow | 0 | 3 | 3
(Spain) Real Madrid | 0 | 1 | 1
(Italy) Milan | 1 | 0 | 1
(France) Marseille | 1 | 3 | 4

Semi-finals
(Germany) Bayern Munich | 1 | 2 | 3
(Socialist Federal Republic of Yugoslavia) Red Star Belgrade | 2 | 2 | 4
(Soviet Union) Spartak Moscow | 1 | 1 | 2
(France) Marseille | 3 | 2 | 5

Final
(Socialist Federal Republic of Yugoslavia) Red Star Belgrade (p.) | 0(5)
(France) Marseille | 0(3)

== First round ==
=== Seeding ===
The 30 teams were divided into a seeded and unseeded pot, each containing 15 teams, for the draw.

| Seeded | | Unseeded | |
|---|---|---|---|
| (France) Marseille; (West Germany) Bayern Munich; (Spain) Real Madrid; (Portugal) Porto; (Socialist Federal Republic of Yugoslavia) Red Star Belgrade; (East Germany) Dynamo Dresden; (Italy) Napoli; (Romania) Dinamo București | (Scotland) Rangers; (Bulgaria) CSKA Sofia; (Poland) Lech Poznań; (Soviet Union) Spartak Moscow; (Sweden) Malmö FF; (Austria) Swarovski Tirol; (Belgium) Club Brugge | (Czechoslovakia) Sparta Prague; (Finland) Kuusysi; (Greece) Panathinaikos; (Hungary) Újpesti Dózsa; (Albania) Dinamo Tirana; (Switzerland) Grasshopper; (Turkey) Beşiktaş; (Cyprus) APOEL | (Norway) Lillestrøm; Union Luxembourg; (Malta) Valletta; (Iceland) KA; (Denmark) OB; (Northern Ireland) Portadown; (Republic of Ireland) St Patrick's Athletic |

=== Summary ===
| Team 1 | Agg. | Team 2 | 1st leg | 2nd leg |
|---|---|---|---|---|
| APOEL (Cyprus) | 2–7 | (West Germany) Bayern Munich | 2–3 | 0–4 |
| KA (Iceland) | 1–3 | (Bulgaria) CSKA Sofia | 1–0 | 0–3 |
| Dinamo București (Romania) | 5–1 | (Republic of Ireland) St Patrick's Athletic | 4–0 | 1–1 |
| Porto (Portugal) | 13–1 | (Northern Ireland) Portadown | 5–0 | 8–1 |
| Red Star Belgrade (Socialist Federal Republic of Yugoslavia) | 5–2 | (Switzerland) Grasshopper | 1–1 | 4–1 |
| Valletta (Malta) | 0–10 | (Scotland) Rangers | 0–4 | 0–6 |
| Union Luxembourg | 1–6 | (Germany) Dynamo Dresden | 1–3 | 0–3 |
| Malmö FF (Sweden) | 5–4 | (Turkey) Beşiktaş | 3–2 | 2–2 |
| Napoli (Italy) | 5–0 | (Hungary) Újpesti Dózsa | 3–0 | 2–0 |
| Sparta Prague (Czechoslovakia) | 0–4 | (Soviet Union) Spartak Moscow | 0–2 | 0–2 |
| OB (Denmark) | 1–10 | (Spain) Real Madrid | 1–4 | 0–6 |
| Swarovski Tirol (Austria) | 7–1 | (Finland) Kuusysi | 5–0 | 2–1 |
| Milan (Italy) | Bye | | – | – |
| Lillestrøm (Norway) | 1–3 | (Belgium) Club Brugge | 1–1 | 0–2 |
| Lech Poznań (Poland) | 5–1 | (Greece) Panathinaikos | 3–0 | 2–1 |
| Marseille (France) | 5–1 | (Albania) Dinamo Tirana | 5–1 | 0–0 |

=== First leg ===
18 September 1990
20:00 CEST

| OB (Denmark) | 1–4 | (Spain) Real Madrid |
|---|---|---|
| Pedersen 22' | Report | Aldana 18'; Sánchez 26'; Villarroya 83'; Maqueda 87' |

Odense Atletikstadion, Odense
Attendance: 8,284
Referee: Wieland Ziller (East Germany)

19 September 1990
19:00 CEST

| APOEL (Cyprus) | 2–3 | (West Germany) Bayern Munich |
|---|---|---|
| Gogić 5'; Pantziaras 78' | Report | Reuter 71'; McInally 87'; Strunz 89' |

Makario Stadium, Nicosia
Attendance: 11,000
Referee: Ștefan Petrescu (Romania)

19 September 1990
19:30 CEST

| KA (Iceland) | 1–0 | (Bulgaria) CSKA Sofia |
|---|---|---|
| Jakobsson 12' | Report |

Akureyrarvöllur, Akureyri
Attendance: 1,208
Referee: Henning Lund-Sørensen (Denmark)

19 September 1990
16:00 CEST

| Dinamo București (Romania) | 4–0 | (Republic of Ireland) St Patrick's Athletic |
|---|---|---|
| Doboș 2'; Damaschin 19'; Mateuț 24'; Cheregi 80' | Report |

Stadionul Dinamo, Bucharest
Attendance: 2,050
Referee: Friedrich Kaupe (Austria)

19 September 1990
19:00 CEST

| Porto (Portugal) | 5–0 | (Northern Ireland) Portadown |
|---|---|---|
| Stewart 6' (o.g.); Paille 17', 77'; Kostadinov 32'; Branco 50' | Report |

Estádio do Bonfim, Setúbal
Attendance: 3,000
Referee: René Bindels (Luxembourg)

19 September 1990
17:30 CEST

| Red Star Belgrade (Socialist Federal Republic of Yugoslavia) | 1–1 | (Switzerland) Grasshopper |
|---|---|---|
| Binić 43' | Report | Közle 14' |

Marakana, Belgrade
Attendance: 50,157
Referee: Carlo Longhi (Italy)

19 September 1990
16:45 CEST

| Valletta (Malta) | 0–4 | (Scotland) Rangers |
|---|---|---|
| | Report | McCoist 16' (pen.); Hateley 58'; Johnston 75', 80' |

National Stadium, Attard
Attendance: 1,731
Referee: Vassilios Nikakis (Greece)

19 September 1990
19:00 CEST

| Union Luxembourg | 1–3 | (East Germany) Dynamo Dresden |
|---|---|---|
| Morocutti 45' | Report | Gütschow 47'; Birsens 79' (o.g.); Ratke 90' |

Stade Achille Hammerel, Luxembourg
Attendance: 1,476
Referee: Cees Bakker (Netherlands)

19 September 1990
19:00 CEST

| Malmö FF (Sweden) | 3–2 | (Turkey) Beşiktaş |
|---|---|---|
| Lindman 29'; Sundström 58'; Recep 62' (o.g.) | Report | Uçar 50', 59' |

Malmö Stadion, Malmö
Attendance: 5,580
Referee: Hubert Forstinger (Austria)

19 September 1990
20:30 CEST

| Napoli (Italy) | 3–0 | (Hungary) Újpesti Dózsa |
|---|---|---|
| Baroni 35'; Maradona 43', 77' | Report |

Stadio San Paolo, Naples
Attendance: 39,327
Referee: Guy Goethals (Belgium)

19 September 1990
17:00 CEST

| Sparta Prague (Czechoslovakia) | 0–2 | (Soviet Union) Spartak Moscow |
|---|---|---|
| | Report | Shalimov 25'; Shmarov 57' |

Stadion Letná, Prague
Attendance: 7,702
Referee: Serge Muhmenthaler (Switzerland)

19 September 1990
19:30 CEST

| Swarovski Tirol (Austria) | 5–0 | (Finland) Kuusysi |
|---|---|---|
| Gorosito 29'; Prudlo 35'; Pacult 41', 58', 80' | Report |

Tivoli-Stadion, Innsbruck
Attendance: 7,250
Referee: Borislav Aleksandrov (Bulgaria)

19 September 1990
17:15 CEST

| Lillestrøm (Norway) | 1–1 | (Belgium) Club Brugge |
|---|---|---|
| Halle 80' | Report | Staelens 3' |

Åråsen Stadion, Lillestrøm
Attendance: 1,939
Referee: Oli Olsen (Iceland)

19 September 1990
20:00 CEST

| Lech Poznań (Poland) | 3–0 | (Greece) Panathinaikos |
|---|---|---|
| Jakołcewicz 2' (pen.), 19'; Rzepka 62' | Report |

Stadion Miejski, Poznań
Attendance: 13,063
Referee: Erik Fredriksson (Sweden)

19 September 1990
20:30 CEST

| Marseille (France) | 5–1 | (Albania) Dinamo Tirana |
|---|---|---|
| Papin 44' (pen.), 63', 75'; Cantona 70'; Vercruysse 90' | Report | Tahiri 89' (pen.) |

Stade Vélodrome, Marseille
Attendance: 22,328
Referee: Frans Houben (Netherlands)

=== Second leg ===
2 October 1990
20:15 CEST

| Bayern Munich (West Germany) | 4–0 | (Cyprus) APOEL |
|---|---|---|
| Augenthaler 48'; Mihajlović 64', 89', 90' | Report |

Olympiastadion, Munich
Attendance: 10,500
Referee: Edgar Azzopardi (Malta)

Bayern Munich won 7–2 on aggregate.

2 October 1990
21:05 CEST

| Rangers (Scotland) | 6–0 | (Malta) Valletta |
|---|---|---|
| Dodds 5'; Spencer 6'; Johnston 19', 37', 78' (pen.); McCoist 75' | Report |

Ibrox Park, Glasgow
Attendance: 20,627
Referee: Howard King (Wales)

Rangers won 10–0 on aggregate.

2 October 1990
21:15 CEST

| Real Madrid (Spain) | 6–0 | (Denmark) OB |
|---|---|---|
| Losada 13', 53', 75'; Míchel 34' (pen.); Aldana 46', 81' | Report |

Santiago Bernabéu, Madrid
Attendance: 15,000
Referee: Arturo Martino (Switzerland)

Real Madrid won 10–1 on aggregate.

3 October 1990
17:00 CEST

| CSKA Sofia (Bulgaria) | 3–0 | (Iceland) KA |
|---|---|---|
| Marashliev 19', 80'; Georgiev 48' | Report |

Stadion Balgarska Armia, Sofia
Attendance: 8,970
Referee: Plarent Kotherja (Albania)

CSKA Sofia won 3–1 on aggregate.

3 October 1990
20:30 CEST

| St Patrick's Athletic (Republic of Ireland) | 1–1 | (Romania) Dinamo București |
|---|---|---|
| Fenlon 36' | Report | Mateuț 76' |

Tolka Park, Dublin
Attendance: 1,200
Referee: Henning Lund-Sørensen (Denmark)

Dinamo București won 5–1 on aggregate.

3 October 1990
20:30 CEST

| Portadown (Northern Ireland) | 1–8 | (Portugal) Porto |
|---|---|---|
| Fraser 36' | Report | Madjer 9', 15', 33', 55'; Semedo 40'; Paille 50', 79'; Jorge Couto 68' |

Shamrock Park, Portadown
Attendance: 2,486
Referee: Sveinn Sveinsson (Iceland)

Porto won 13–1 on aggregate.

3 October 1990
20:00 CEST

| Grasshopper (Switzerland) | 1–4 | (Socialist Federal Republic of Yugoslavia) Red Star Belgrade |
|---|---|---|
| Közle 62' (pen.) | Report | Pančev 11'; Prosinečki 49' (pen.), 84' (pen.); Radinović 58' |

Hardturm, Zürich
Attendance: 25,500
Referee: José Rosa dos Santos (Portugal)

Red Star Belgrade won 5–2 on aggregate.

3 October 1990
20:00 CET

| Dynamo Dresden (Germany) | 3–0 | Union Luxembourg |
|---|---|---|
| Jähnig 18', 45'; Gütschow 34' | Report |

Rudolf-Harbig-Stadion, Dresden
Attendance: 6,250
Referee: Tadeusz Ignatowicz (Poland)

Dynamo Dresden won 6–1 on aggregate.

3 October 1990
19:00 CEST

| Beşiktaş (Turkey) | 2–2 | (Sweden) Malmö FF |
|---|---|---|
| Gültiken 31'; Uçar 44' | Report | Ekheim 54'; Larsson 64' |

İnönü Stadium, Istanbul
Attendance: 21,033
Referee: Wolf-Günter Wiesel (Germany)

Malmö FF won 5–4 on aggregate.

3 October 1990
18:30 CEST

| Újpesti Dózsa (Hungary) | 0–2 | (Italy) Napoli |
|---|---|---|
| | Report | Incocciati 13'; Alemão 35' |

Megyeri út, Budapest
Attendance: 14,000
Referee: Claude Bouillet (France)

Napoli won 5–0 on aggregate.

3 October 1990
17:05 CEST

| Spartak Moscow (Soviet Union) | 2–0 | (Czechoslovakia) Sparta Prague |
|---|---|---|
| Perepadenko 33'; O. Ivanov 51' | Report |

Central Lenin Stadium, Moscow
Attendance: 19,000
Referee: Klaus Peschel (Germany)

Spartak Moscow won 4–0 on aggregate.

3 October 1990
18:00 CEST

| Kuusysi (Finland) | 1–2 | (Austria) Swarovski Tirol |
|---|---|---|
| Vehkakoski 71' (pen.) | Report | Pacult 5', 50' (pen.) |

Lahden stadion, Lahti
Attendance: 428
Referee: Wojciech Rudy (Poland)

Swarovski Tirol won 7–1 on aggregate.

3 October 1990
20:00 CEST

| Club Brugge (Belgium) | 2–0 | (Norway) Lillestrøm |
|---|---|---|
| Booy 2'; Farina 83' | Report |

Olympiastadion, Bruges
Attendance: 13,884
Referee: Alan Snoddy (Northern Ireland)

Club Brugge won 3–1 on aggregate.

3 October 1990
19:00 CEST

| Panathinaikos (Greece) | 1–2 | (Poland) Lech Poznań |
|---|---|---|
| Saravakos 44' (pen.) | Report | Pachelski 68'; Moskal 85' |

O.A.K.A., Athens
Attendance: 49,310
Referee: Bruno Galler (Switzerland)

Lech Poznań won 5–1 on aggregate.

3 October 1990
15:30 CEST

| Dinamo Tirana (Albania) | 0–0 | (France) Marseille |
|---|---|---|
| | Report |

Qemal Stafa Stadium, Tirana
Attendance: 6,200
Referee: Pierluigi Pairetto (Italy)

Marseille won 5–1 on aggregate.

== Second round ==
=== Seeding ===
The 16 teams were divided into a seeded and unseeded pot, each containing 8 teams, for the draw.

| Seeded | Unseeded |
|---|---|
| (Italy) Milan; (France) Marseille; (Germany) Bayern Munich; (Spain) Real Madrid; (Portugal) Porto; (Socialist Federal Republic of Yugoslavia) Red Star Belgrade; (Germany) Dynamo Dresden; (Italy) Napoli | (Romania) Dinamo București; (Scotland) Rangers; (Bulgaria) CSKA Sofia; (Poland) Lech Poznań; (Soviet Union) Spartak Moscow; (Sweden) Malmö FF; (Austria) Swarovski Tirol; (Belgium) Club Brugge |

=== Summary ===
| Team 1 | Agg. | Team 2 | 1st leg | 2nd leg |
|---|---|---|---|---|
| Bayern Munich (Germany) | 7–0 | (Bulgaria) CSKA Sofia | 4–0 | 3–0 |
| Dinamo București (Romania) | 0–4 | (Portugal) Porto | 0–0 | 0–4 |
| Red Star Belgrade (Socialist Federal Republic of Yugoslavia) | 4–1 | (Scotland) Rangers | 3–0 | 1–1 |
| Dynamo Dresden (Germany) | 2–2 (5–4 p) | (Sweden) Malmö FF | 1–1 | 1–1 |
| Napoli (Italy) | 0–0 (3–5 p) | (Soviet Union) Spartak Moscow | 0–0 | 0–0 |
| Real Madrid (Spain) | 11–3 | (Austria) Swarovski Tirol | 9–1 | 2–2 |
| Milan (Italy) | 1–0 | (Belgium) Club Brugge | 0–0 | 1–0 |
| Lech Poznań (Poland) | 4–8 | (France) Marseille | 3–2 | 1–6 |

=== First leg ===
23 October 1990
20:00 CEST

| Bayern Munich (Germany) | 4–0 | (Bulgaria) CSKA Sofia |
|---|---|---|
| Reuter 3', 63' (pen.); Wohlfarth 28'; Augenthaler 54' | Report |

Olympiastadion, Munich
Attendance: 11,500
Referee: Einar Halle (Norway)

24 October 1990
15:00 CEST

| Dinamo București (Romania) | 0–0 | (Portugal) Porto |
|---|---|---|
| | Report |

Stadionul Dinamo, Bucharest
Attendance: 2,062
Referee: Helmut Kohl (Austria)

24 October 1990
17:00 CEST

| Red Star Belgrade (Socialist Federal Republic of Yugoslavia) | 3–0 | (Scotland) Rangers |
|---|---|---|
| Brown 8' (o.g.); Prosinečki 65'; Pančev 74' | Report |

Marakana, Belgrade
Attendance: 58,223
Referee: Joël Quiniou (France)

24 October 1990
20:00 CET

| Dynamo Dresden (Germany) | 1–1 | (Sweden) Malmö FF |
|---|---|---|
| Gütschow 45' | Report | Engqvist 18' |

Rudolf-Harbig-Stadion, Dresden
Attendance: 6,870
Referee: Frederick McKnight (Northern Ireland)

24 October 1990
20:30 CEST

| Napoli (Italy) | 0–0 | (Soviet Union) Spartak Moscow |
|---|---|---|
| | Report |

Stadio San Paolo, Naples
Attendance: 46,063
Referee: Aron Schmidhuber (Germany)

24 October 1990
21:15 CEST

| Real Madrid (Spain) | 9–1 | (Austria) Swarovski Tirol |
|---|---|---|
| Butragueño 4', 31', 48'; Sánchez 7', 13', 73', 85'; Hierro 37'; Tendillo 80' | Report | Pacult 16' |

Santiago Bernabéu, Madrid
Attendance: 31,000
Referee: Keith Hackett (England)

24 October 1990
20:30 CEST

| Milan (Italy) | 0–0 | (Belgium) Club Brugge |
|---|---|---|
| | Report |

San Siro, Milan
Attendance: 71,307
Referee: Hubert Forstinger (Austria)

25 October 1990
20:45 CEST

| Lech Poznań (Poland) | 3–2 | (France) Marseille |
|---|---|---|
| Łukasik 30'; Pachelski 41'; Juskowiak 58' | Report | Fournier 8'; Waddle 63' |

Stadion Miejski, Poznań
Attendance: 12,661
Referee: Thorbjørn Aas (Norway)

=== Second leg ===
6 November 1990
16:30 CET

| CSKA Sofia (Bulgaria) | 0–3 | (Germany) Bayern Munich |
|---|---|---|
| | Report | Wohlfarth 17'; Effenberg 79'; McInally 84' |

Stadion Balgarska Armia, Sofia
Attendance: 6,100
Referee: Henning Lund-Sørensen (Denmark)

Bayern Munich won 7–0 on aggregate.

7 November 1990
22:30 CET

| Porto (Portugal) | 4–0 | (Romania) Dinamo București |
|---|---|---|
| Kostadinov 3', 22'; Geraldão 48' (pen.); Domingos 63' | Report |

Estádio das Antas, Porto
Attendance: 20,000
Referee: Tullio Lanese (Italy)

Porto won 4–0 on aggregate.

7 November 1990
21:00 CET

| Rangers (Scotland) | 1–1 | (Socialist Federal Republic of Yugoslavia) Red Star Belgrade |
|---|---|---|
| McCoist 76' | Report | Pančev 52' |

Ibrox Park, Glasgow
Attendance: 23,821
Referee: Bo Karlsson (Sweden)

Red Star Belgrade won 4–1 on aggregate.

7 November 1990
19:00 CET

| Malmö FF (Sweden) | 1–1 (a.e.t.) | (Germany) Dynamo Dresden |
|---|---|---|
| Persson 52' (pen.) | Report | Gütschow 17' (pen.) |
Penalties
| Persson (penalty missed); Skammelsrud (penalty scored); Ågren (penalty scored); Nylén (penalty scored); Engqvist (penalty scored) | 4–5 | (penalty scored) Lieberam; (penalty scored) Schößler; (penalty scored) Wagenhaus; (penalty scored) Kern; (penalty scored) Gütschow |

Malmö Stadion, Malmö
Attendance: 8,112
Referee: Andrew Waddell (Scotland)

2–2 on aggregate. Dynamo Dresden won 5–4 on penalties.

7 November 1990
15:00 CET

| Spartak Moscow (Soviet Union) | 0–0 (a.e.t.) | (Italy) Napoli |
|---|---|---|
| | Report |
Penalties
| Karpin (penalty scored); Shalimov (penalty scored); Shmarov (penalty scored); Kulkov (penalty scored); Mostovoi (penalty scored) | 5–3 | (penalty scored) Ferrara; (penalty scored) Mauro; (penalty missed) Baroni; (penalty scored) Maradona |

Central Lenin Stadium, Moscow
Attendance: 86,000
Referee: Michel Girard (France)

0–0 on aggregate. Spartak Moscow won 5–3 on penalties.

7 November 1990
19:30 CET

| Swarovski Tirol (Austria) | 2–2 | (Spain) Real Madrid |
|---|---|---|
| Hörtnagl 13'; Linzmaier 90' | Report | Losada 33', 44' |

Tivoli-Stadion, Innsbruck
Attendance: 14,000
Referee: John Blankenstein (Netherlands)

Real Madrid won 11–3 on aggregate.

7 November 1990
20:30 CET

| Club Brugge (Belgium) | 0–1 | (Italy) Milan |
|---|---|---|
| | Report | Carbone 47' |

Olympiastadion, Bruges
Attendance: 23,500
Referee: David Syme (Scotland)

Milan won 1–0 on aggregate.

7 November 1990
21:00 CET

| Marseille (France) | 6–1 | (Poland) Lech Poznań |
|---|---|---|
| Papin 20'; Vercruysse 28', 45', 85'; Tigana 89'; Boli 90' | Report | Jakołcewicz 60' (pen.) |

Stade Vélodrome, Marseille
Attendance: 29,588
Referee: Joe Worrall (England)

Marseille won 8–4 on aggregate.

== Quarter-finals ==
| Team 1 | Agg. | Team 2 | 1st leg | 2nd leg |
|---|---|---|---|---|
| Bayern Munich (Germany) | 3–1 | (Portugal) Porto | 1–1 | 2–0 |
| Red Star Belgrade (Socialist Federal Republic of Yugoslavia) | 6–0 | (Germany) Dynamo Dresden | 3–0 | 3–0^{1} |
| Spartak Moscow (Soviet Union) | 3–1 | (Spain) Real Madrid | 0–0 | 3–1 |
| Milan (Italy) | 1–4 | (France) Marseille | 1–1 | 0–3^{2} |

^{1} – Match abandoned due to rioting after 78 mins. With Red Star Belgrade leading 2–1, they were awarded the match 3–0.

^{2} – With the score at 1–0 to Marseille during stoppage time at the end of the second half, the floodlights failed. Milan refused to play on when lighting was restored and Marseille were awarded the match 3–0.

=== First leg ===
6 March 1991
20:15 CET

| Bayern Munich (Germany) | 1–1 | (Portugal) Porto |
|---|---|---|
| Bender 30' | Report | Domingos 65' |

Olympiastadion, Munich
Attendance: 40,000
Referee: Guy Goethals (Belgium)

6 March 1991
15:30 CET

| Red Star Belgrade (Socialist Federal Republic of Yugoslavia) | 3–0 | (Germany) Dynamo Dresden |
|---|---|---|
| Prosinečki 21'; Binić 43'; Savićević 56' | Report |

Marakana, Belgrade
Attendance: 73,730
Referee: Alexey Spirin (Soviet Union)

6 March 1991
17:00 CET

| Spartak Moscow (Soviet Union) | 0–0 | (Spain) Real Madrid |
|---|---|---|
| | Report |

Central Lenin Stadium, Moscow
Attendance: 81,000
Referee: Karl-Heinz Tritschler (Germany)

6 March 1991
20:30 CET

| Milan (Italy) | 1–1 | (France) Marseille |
|---|---|---|
| Gullit 14' | Report | Papin 27' |

San Siro, Milan
Attendance: 81,051
Referee: Bruno Galler (Switzerland)

=== Second leg ===
20 March 1991
22:30 CET

| Porto (Portugal) | 0–2 | (Germany) Bayern Munich |
|---|---|---|
| | Report | Ziege 19'; Bender 67' |

Estádio das Antas, Porto
Attendance: 65,000
Referee: Keith Hackett (England)

Bayern Munich won 3–1 on aggregate.

20 March 1991
20:15 CET

| Dynamo Dresden (Germany) | 0–3 Awarded | (Socialist Federal Republic of Yugoslavia) Red Star Belgrade |
|---|---|---|
| Gütschow 3' (pen.) | Report | Savićević 52'; Pančev 69' |

Rudolf-Harbig-Stadion, Dresden
Attendance: 10,761
Referee: Emilio Soriano Aladrén (Spain)

The match was abandoned in the 78th minute as per the decision by the match referee Emilio Soriano Aladrén due to Dynamo Dresden fans causing commotion in the stands and pelting the pitch with objects that landed in the vicinity of Red Star player Robert Prosinečki who was about to take a corner kick and the assistant referee on the sideline. Following several minutes of unsuccessful attempts to calm the fans, the match referee ordered the teams off the pitch and the contest was never resumed. Red Star Belgrade led 2–1 on the night and 5–1 on aggregate at the moment of the stoppage. At a disciplinary hearing several days later, UEFA awarded a 3–0 win to Red Star Belgrade and banned Dynamo Dresden for a year from European competition.
Red Star Belgrade won 6–0 on aggregate.

20 March 1991
21:00 CET

| Real Madrid (Spain) | 1–3 | (Soviet Union) Spartak Moscow |
|---|---|---|
| Butragueño 9' | Report | Radchenko 19', 38'; Shmarov 63' |

Santiago Bernabéu, Madrid
Attendance: 65,000
Referee: Andrew Waddell (Scotland)

Spartak Moscow won 3–1 on aggregate.

20 March 1991
20:30 CET

| Marseille (France) | 3–0 Awarded | (Italy) Milan |
|---|---|---|
| Waddle 75' | Report |

Stade Vélodrome, Marseille
Attendance: 37,603
Referee: Bo Karlsson (Sweden)

The match was interrupted in injury time due to poor visibility after two of the four floodlights in the stadium failed. Marseille led 1–0 on the night and 2–1 on aggregate at the moment. When power was restored after 15 minutes, Milan director Adriano Galliani decided not to let his team go back on the pitch at which point the contest was abandoned permanently. UEFA awarded a 3–0 win to Marseille and banned Milan for a year from European competition including suspending Galliani from all official club functions for two years.
Marseille won 4–1 on aggregate.

== Semi-finals ==
| Team 1 | Agg. | Team 2 | 1st leg | 2nd leg |
|---|---|---|---|---|
| Bayern Munich (Germany) | 3–4 | (Socialist Federal Republic of Yugoslavia) Red Star Belgrade | 1–2 | 2–2 |
| Spartak Moscow (Soviet Union) | 2–5 | (France) Marseille | 1–3 | 1–2 |

=== First leg ===
10 April 1991
20:15 CEST

| Bayern Munich (Germany) | 1–2 | (Socialist Federal Republic of Yugoslavia) Red Star Belgrade |
|---|---|---|
| Wohlfarth 23' | Report | Pančev 45'; Savićević 70' |

Olympiastadion, Munich
Attendance: 63,700
Referee: Hubert Forstinger (Austria)

10 April 1991
17:00 CEST

| Spartak Moscow (Soviet Union) | 1–3 | (France) Marseille |
|---|---|---|
| Shalimov 56' | Report | Abedi Pele 27'; Papin 31'; Vercruysse 89' |

Central Lenin Stadium, Moscow
Attendance: 86,500
Referee: Peter Mikkelsen (Denmark)

=== Second leg ===
24 April 1991
20:15 CEST

| Red Star Belgrade (Socialist Federal Republic of Yugoslavia) | 2–2 | (Germany) Bayern Munich |
|---|---|---|
| Mihajlović 25'; Augenthaler 90' (o.g.) | Report | Augenthaler 62'; Bender 67' |

Marakana, Belgrade
Attendance: 79,684
Referee: Bruno Galler (Switzerland)

Red Star Belgrade won 4–3 on aggregate.

24 April 1991
20:45 CEST

| Marseille (France) | 2–1 | (Soviet Union) Spartak Moscow |
|---|---|---|
| Abedi Pele 34'; Boli 48' | Report | Mostovoi 58' (pen.) |

Stade Vélodrome, Marseille
Attendance: 37,466
Referee: Keith Hackett (England)

Marseille won 5–2 on aggregate.

== Final ==
29 May 1991
20:15 CEST

| Red Star Belgrade (Socialist Federal Republic of Yugoslavia) | 0–0 (a.e.t.) | (France) Marseille |
|---|---|---|
| | Report |
Penalties
| Prosinečki (penalty scored); Binić (penalty scored); Belodedić (penalty scored); Mihajlović (penalty scored); Pančev (penalty scored) | 5–3 | (penalty missed) Amoros; (penalty scored) Casoni; (penalty scored) Papin; (penalty scored) Mozer |

Stadio San Nicola, Bari
Attendance: 51,587
Referee: Tullio Lanese (Italy)

== Top scorers ==
The top scorers from the 1990–91 European Cup are as follows:

| Rank | Name | Team | Goals |
|---|---|---|---|
| 1 | (Austria) Peter Pacult | (Austria) Swarovski Tirol | 6 |
| 1 | (France) Jean-Pierre Papin | (France) Olympique Marseille | 6 |
| 3 | (Germany) Torsten Gütschow | (Germany) Dynamo Dresden | 5 |
| 3 | (Scotland) Mo Johnston | (Scotland) Rangers | 5 |
| 3 | (Spain) Sebastián Losada | (Spain) Real Madrid | 5 |
| 3 | (Socialist Federal Republic of Yugoslavia) Darko Pančev | (Socialist Federal Republic of Yugoslavia) Red Star Belgrade | 5 |
| 3 | (Mexico) Hugo Sánchez | (Spain) Real Madrid | 5 |
| 3 | (France) Philippe Vercruysse | (France) Olympique Marseille | 5 |
| 9 | (Spain) Emilio Butragueño | (Spain) Real Madrid | 4 |
| 9 | (Algeria) Rabah Madjer | (Portugal) Porto | 4 |
| 9 | (France) Stéphane Paille | (Portugal) Porto | 4 |
| 9 | (Socialist Federal Republic of Yugoslavia) Robert Prosinečki | (Socialist Federal Republic of Yugoslavia) Red Star Belgrade | 4 |

On 29 May 2020, Red Star marked the 29th anniversary of their European Cup victory with a reception at the Rajko Mitić Stadium, attended by former club players.
