= 1988–89 European Cup Winners' Cup =

Tournament details
- Dates: 10 August 1988 – 10 May 1989
- Teams: 32 (first round); 33 (qualifying)

Final positions
- Champions: (Spain) Barcelona (3rd title)
- Runners-up: (Italy) Sampdoria

Tournament statistics
- Matches played: 63
- Goals scored: 152 (2.41 per match)
- Attendance: 917,269 (14,560 per match)
- Top scorer(s): Hristo Stoichkov (CSKA Sofia); 7 goals

The 1988–89 season of the European Cup Winners' Cup was won for the third time by Barcelona in the final against Italian entrants Sampdoria. The two sides would meet again in the 1992 European Cup Final, which Barcelona also won. Wimbledon did not participate due to UEFA's five-year ban on English clubs from European competition. The defending champions Mechelen were eliminated in the semi-finals by eventual runners-up Sampdoria.

== Preliminary round ==
Team 1	Agg.	Team 2	1st leg	2nd leg
Békéscsaba (Hungary)	4–2	(Norway) Bryne	3–0	1–2

=== First leg ===
10 August 1988

Békéscsaba (Hungary)	3–0	(Norway) Bryne
Gruborovics 4', 10'; Csató 37'	Report

Kórház utcai Stadion, Békéscsaba
Attendance: 4,200
Referee: Wolf-Günter Wiesel (West Germany)

=== Second leg ===
24 August 1988

Bryne (Norway)	2–1	(Hungary) Békéscsaba
Hellvik 45' (pen.); Meinseth 80' (pen.)	Report	Kvaszta 35'

Bryne Stadion, Bryne
Attendance: 630
Referee: Kenny Hope (Scotland)

Békéscsaba won 4–2 on aggregate.

== First round ==
Team 1	Agg.	Team 2	1st leg	2nd leg
Derry City (Republic of Ireland)	0–4	(Wales) Cardiff City	0–0	0–4
Glenavon (Northern Ireland)	2–7	(Denmark) AGF	1–4	1–3
Fram (Iceland)	0–7	(Spain) Barcelona	0–2	0–5
Flamurtari Vlorë (Albania)	2–4	(Poland) Lech Poznań	2–3	0–1
Internacionál Bratislava (Czechoslovakia)	2–8	(Bulgaria) CSKA Sofia	2–3	0–5
Omonia (Cyprus)	0–3	(Greece) Panathinaikos	0–1	0–2
Roda JC (Netherlands)	2–1	(Portugal) Vitória de Guimarães	2–0	0–1
Borac Banja Luka (Socialist Federal Republic of Yugoslavia)	2–4	(Soviet Union) Metalist Kharkiv	2–0	0–4
Grasshopper (Switzerland)	0–1	(West Germany) Eintracht Frankfurt	0–0	0–1
Sakaryaspor (Turkey)	2–1	(Hungary) Békéscsaba	2–0	0–1
Mechelen (Belgium)	8–1	(Luxembourg) Avenir Beggen	5–0	3–1
Metz (France)	1–5	(Belgium) Anderlecht	1–3	0–2
Floriana (Malta)	0–1	(Scotland) Dundee United	0–0	0–1
Dinamo București (Romania)	6–0	(Finland) Kuusysi Lahti	3–0	3–0
Carl Zeiss Jena (East Germany)	5–1	(Austria) Kremser SC	5–0	0–1
IFK Norrköping (Sweden)	2–3	(Italy) Sampdoria	2–1	0–2

=== First leg ===
6 September 1988

Omonia (Cyprus)	0–1	(Greece) Panathinaikos
	Report	Mavridis 13'

Makario Stadium, Nicosia
Attendance: 21,182
Referee: Dimitar Dimitrov (Bulgaria)

6 September 1988

Grasshopper (Switzerland)	0–0	(West Germany) Eintracht Frankfurt
	Report

St. Jakob Stadium, Basel
Attendance: 13,600
Referee: George Smith (Scotland)

6 September 1988

Floriana (Malta)	0–0	(Scotland) Dundee United
	Report

National Stadium, Ta' Qali, Attard
Attendance: 2,560
Referee: Vaso Vujović (Yugoslavia)

7 September 1988

Derry City (Republic of Ireland)	0–0	(Wales) Cardiff City
	Report

Brandywell Stadium, Derry
Attendance: 7,820
Referee: John Blankenstein (Netherlands)

7 September 1988

Glenavon (Northern Ireland)	1–4	(Denmark) AGF
McCann 17'	Report	Mortensen 25'; Pingel 52', 80'; Rieper 65'

Mourneview Park, Lurgan
Attendance: 1,388
Referee: Alphonse Costantin (Belgium)

7 September 1988

Fram (Iceland)	0–2	(Spain) Barcelona
	Report	Roberto 33', 62'

Laugardalsvöllur, Reykjavík
Attendance: 4,029
Referee: Patrick Kelly (Republic of Ireland)

7 September 1988

Flamurtari Vlorë (Albania)	2–3	(Poland) Lech Poznań
V. Ruci 40', 76'	Report	Łukasik 32'; Araszkiewicz 67'; Głombiowski 89'

Flamurtari Stadium, Vlorë
Attendance: 12,000
Referee: Giorgos Koukoulakis (Greece)

7 September 1988

Internacionál Bratislava (Czechoslovakia)	2–3	(Bulgaria) CSKA Sofia
Moravec 45'; Weiss 58' (pen.)	Report	Penev 36', 39' (pen.), 78'

Štadión Pasienky, Bratislava
Attendance: 4,144
Referee: Adrian Porumboiu (Romania)

7 September 1988

Roda JC (Netherlands)	2–0	(Portugal) Vitória de Guimarães
Nando 65' (o.g.); Van Loen 87'	Report

Gemeentelijk Sportpark Kaalheide, Kerkrade
Attendance: 10,292
Referee: John Spillane (Republic of Ireland)

7 September 1988
19:00

Borac Banja Luka (Socialist Federal Republic of Yugoslavia)	2–0	(Soviet Union) Metalist Kharkiv
Lemić 43'; Lipovac 85' (pen.)	Report

Gradski stadion Banja Luka, Banja Luka
Attendance: 12,500
Referee: Vítor Fernandes Correia (Portugal)

7 September 1988

Sakaryaspor (Turkey)	2–0	(Hungary) Békéscsaba
Pešić 35'; Yücel 50'	Report

Sakarya Atatürk Stadium, Adapazarı
Attendance: 3,900
Referee: Besnik Kaimi (Albania)

7 September 1988

Mechelen (Belgium)	5–0	(Luxembourg) Avenir Beggen
Koeman 59'; Bosman 61' (pen.), 84'; Den Boer 77'; Ohana 88' (pen.)	Report

Achter de Kazerne, Mechelen
Attendance: 6,000
Referee: Wim Egbertzen (Netherlands)

7 September 1988

Metz (France)	1–3	(Belgium) Anderlecht
Zanon 87'	Report	Pfrunner 2' (o.g.); Krnčević 26', 83'

Stade Saint-Symphorien, Metz
Attendance: 15,236
Referee: Victoriano Sánchez Arminio (Spain)

7 September 1988

Dinamo București (Romania)	3–0	(Finland) Kuusysi Lahti
Jäntti 12' (o.g.); Andone 72'; Vaișcovici 74'	Report

Stadionul Dinamo, Bucharest
Attendance: 8,486
Referee: Stefanos Hatzistefanou (Cyprus)

7 September 1988

Carl Zeiss Jena (East Germany)	5–0	(Austria) Kremser SC
Weber 19'; Sträßer 48', 67'; Merkel 53'; Ludwig 78'	Report

Ernst-Abbe-Sportfeld, Jena
Attendance: 9,000
Referee: Christian van der Laar (Netherlands)

7 September 1988

IFK Norrköping (Sweden)	2–1	(Italy) Sampdoria
Andersson 9'; Hellström 86'	Report	Carboni 51'

Norrköpings Idrottspark, Norrköping
Attendance: 13,216
Referee: Allan Gunn (England)

=== Second leg ===
28 September 1988

Avenir Beggen (Luxembourg)	1–3	(Belgium) Mechelen
Krings 66'	Report	Bosman 34' (pen.); Den Boer 55'; Versavel 62'

Stade rue Henri Dunant, Luxembourg City
Attendance: 2,101
Referee: Jean-Marie Lartigot (France)

Mechelen won 8–1 on aggregate.

4 October 1988

Eintracht Frankfurt (West Germany)	1–0	(Switzerland) Grasshopper
Bakalorz 32'	Report

Waldstadion, Frankfurt
Attendance: 13,280
Referee: Dušan Krchňák (Czechoslovakia)

Eintracht Frankfurt won 1–0 on aggregate.

5 October 1988

Cardiff City (Wales)	4–0	(Republic of Ireland) Derry City
McDermott 20'; Gilligan 47', 65', 76'	Report

Ninian Park, Cardiff
Attendance: 6,933
Referee: Egil Nervik (Norway)

Cardiff City won 4–0 on aggregate.

5 October 1988

AGF (Denmark)	3–1	(Northern Ireland) Glenavon
Pingel 26'; Kristensen 57'; Stampe 87'	Report	McConville 89'

Århus Idrætspark, Århus
Attendance: 2,300
Referee: Tadeusz Diakonowicz (Poland)

AGF won 7–2 on aggregate.

5 October 1988

Barcelona (Spain)	5–0	(Iceland) Fram
Lineker 9'; Begiristain 23', 63'; Roberto 66'; Bakero 70'	Report

Camp Nou, Barcelona
Attendance: 23,000
Referee: Michel Vautrot (France)

Barcelona won 7–0 on aggregate.

5 October 1988

Lech Poznań (Poland)	1–0	(Albania) Flamurtari Vlorë
Araszkiewicz 25'	Report

Stadion Miejski, Poznań
Attendance: 18,000
Referee: Esa Palsi (Finland)

Lech Poznań won 4–2 on aggregate.

5 October 1988

CSKA Sofia (Bulgaria)	5–0	(Czechoslovakia) Internacionál Bratislava
Penev 1'; Stoichkov 3'; Kostadinov 13', 38'; Getov 21'	Report

Narodna Armia, Sofia
Attendance: 8,700
Referee: Zdravko Jokić (Yugoslavia)

CSKA won 8–2 on aggregate.

5 October 1988

Panathinaikos (Greece)	2–0	(Cyprus) Omonia
Dimopoulos 56'; Nielsen 59'	Report

O.A.K.A., Athens
Attendance: 11,798
Referee: Namik Jareci (Albania)

Panathinaikos won 3–0 on aggregate.

5 October 1988

Vitória de Guimarães (Portugal)	1–0	(Netherlands) Roda JC
Roldão 27'	Report

Estádio D. Afonso Henriques, Guimarães
Attendance: 15,000
Referee: Heinz Holzmann (Austria)

Roda JC won 2–1 on aggregate.

5 October 1988
18:30

Metalist Kharkiv (Soviet Union)	4–0	(Socialist Federal Republic of Yugoslavia) Borac Banja Luka
Tarasov 25', 62'; Adzhoyev 78' (pen.); Yesipov 88'	Report

Metalist, Kharkiv
Attendance: 32,000
Referee: Håkan Lundgren (Sweden)

Metalist Kharkiv won 4–2 on aggregate.

5 October 1988

Békéscsaba (Hungary)	1–0	(Turkey) Sakaryaspor
Selçuk 49' (o.g.)	Report

Kórház utcai Stadion, Békéscsaba
Attendance: 4,200
Referee: Jiří Stiegler (Czechoslovakia)

Sakaryaspor won 2–1 on aggregate.

5 October 1988

Anderlecht (Belgium)	2–0	(France) Metz
Krnčević 47'; Van Tiggelen 73' (pen.)	Report

Stade Constant Vanden Stock, Anderlecht
Attendance: 12,000
Referee: Siegfried Kirschen (East Germany)

Anderlecht won 5–1 on aggregate.

5 October 1988

Dundee United (Scotland)	1–0	(Malta) Floriana
Meade 69'	Report

Tannadice Park, Dundee
Attendance: 9,138
Referee: Rodger Gifford (Wales)

Dundee United won 1–0 on aggregate.

5 October 1988

Kuusysi Lahti (Finland)	0–3	(Romania) Dinamo București
	Report	Vaișcovici 11' (pen.); Kousa 34' (o.g.); Răducioiu 71' (pen.)

Lahden stadion, Lahti
Attendance: 960
Referee: Aleksandr Kokriakov (Soviet Union)

Dinamo București won 6–0 on aggregate.

5 October 1988

Kremser SC (Austria)	1–0	(East Germany) Carl Zeiss Jena
Studeny 27'	Report

Sepp-Doll-Stadion, Krems an der Donau
Attendance: 2,500
Referee: Pierluigi Magni (Italy)

Carl Zeiss Jena won 5–1 on aggregate.

6 October 1988

Sampdoria (Italy)	2–0	(Sweden) IFK Norrköping
Salsano 37'; Vialli 82'	Report

Stadio Giovanni Zini, Cremona
Attendance: 17,683
Referee: Rolf Blattmann (Switzerland)

Sampdoria won 3–2 on aggregate.

== Second round ==
Team 1	Agg.	Team 2	1st leg	2nd leg
Cardiff City (Wales)	1–6	(Denmark) AGF	1–2	0–4
Barcelona (Spain)	2–2 (5–4 p)	(Poland) Lech Poznań	1–1	1–1 (aet)
CSKA Sofia (Bulgaria)	3–0	(Greece) Panathinaikos	2–0	1–0
Roda JC (Netherlands)	1–0	(Soviet Union) Metalist Kharkiv	1–0	0–0
Eintracht Frankfurt (West Germany)	6–1	(Turkey) Sakaryaspor	3–1	3–0
Mechelen (Belgium)	3–0	(Belgium) Anderlecht	1–0	2–0
Dundee United (Scotland)	1–2	(Romania) Dinamo București	0–1	1–1
Carl Zeiss Jena (East Germany)	2–4	(Italy) Sampdoria	1–1	1–3

=== First leg ===
26 October 1988

Cardiff City (Wales)	1–2	(Denmark) AGF
Gilligan 42'	Report	Kristensen 8', 73'

Ninian Park, Cardiff
Attendance: 6,155
Referee: Roger Philippi (Luxembourg)

26 October 1988

Barcelona (Spain)	1–1	(Poland) Lech Poznań
Roberto 26' (pen.)	Report	Pachelski 66'

Camp Nou, Barcelona
Attendance: 26,000
Referee: Howard King (Wales)

26 October 1988

CSKA Sofia (Bulgaria)	2–0	(Greece) Panathinaikos
Stoichkov 45'; Penev 90' (pen.)	Report

Narodna Armia, Sofia
Attendance: 18,500
Referee: José Rosa dos Santos (Portugal)

26 October 1988

Roda JC (Netherlands)	1–0	(Soviet Union) Metalist Kharkiv
Van der Luer 43'	Report

Gemeentelijk Sportpark Kaalheide, Kerkrade
Attendance: 11,147
Referee: Einar Halle (Norway)

26 October 1988

Eintracht Frankfurt (West Germany)	3–1	(Turkey) Sakaryaspor
Sievers 9'; Balzis 31'; Studer 43'	Report	Kemal 85' (pen.)

Waldstadion, Frankfurt
Attendance: 21,003
Referee: John Spillane (Republic of Ireland)

26 October 1988

Mechelen (Belgium)	1–0	(Belgium) Anderlecht
Wilmots 88'	Report

Achter de Kazerne, Mechelen
Attendance: 13,000
Referee: Michel Vautrot (France)

26 October 1988

Dundee United (Scotland)	0–1	(Romania) Dinamo București
	Report	Mateuț 89'

Tannadice Park, Dundee
Attendance: 10,594
Referee: Guy Goethals (Belgium)

26 October 1988

Carl Zeiss Jena (East Germany)	1–1	(Italy) Sampdoria
Weber 38'	Report	Vialli 81' (pen.)

Ernst-Abbe-Sportfeld, Jena
Attendance: 13,500
Referee: Bo Karlsson (Sweden)

=== Second leg ===
9 November 1988

AGF (Denmark)	4–0	(Wales) Cardiff City
Pingel 15'; P. Andersen 25', 75'; Stampe 82' (pen.)	Report

Århus Idrætspark, Århus
Attendance: 3,700
Referee: Kaj Natri (Finland)

AGF won 6–1 on aggregate.

9 November 1988

Lech Poznań (Poland)	1–1 (a.e.t.)	(Spain) Barcelona
Kruszczyński 28' (pen.)	Report	Roberto 37'
Penalties
Kruszczyński (penalty scored); Jakołcewicz (penalty scored); Rzepka (penalty scored); Araszkiewicz (penalty missed); Pachelski (penalty missed); Głombiowski (penalty scored); Łukasik (penalty missed)	4–5	(penalty missed) Roberto; (penalty scored) Begiristain; (penalty scored) Valverde; (penalty scored) Eusebio; (penalty missed) Alexanko; (penalty scored) Bakero; (penalty scored) Aloísio

Stadion Miejski, Poznań
Attendance: 26,000
Referee: Sadık Deda (Turkey)

2–2 on aggregate; Barcelona won 5–4 on penalties.

9 November 1988

Panathinaikos (Greece)	0–1	(Bulgaria) CSKA Sofia
	Report	Penev 85' (pen.)

O.A.K.A., Athens
Attendance: 49,843
Referee: Keith Hackett (England)

CSKA won 3–0 on aggregate.

9 November 1988

Metalist Kharkiv (Soviet Union)	0–0	(Netherlands) Roda JC
	Report

Metalist, Kharkiv
Attendance: 30,000
Referee: Gerasimos Germanakos (Greece)

Roda JC won 1–0 on aggregate.

9 November 1988

Sakaryaspor (Turkey)	0–3	(West Germany) Eintracht Frankfurt
	Report	Sievers 5'; Binz 35'; Schulz 65'

Sakarya Atatürk Stadium, Adapazarı
Attendance: 5,526
Referee: Hubert Forstinger (Austria)

Eintracht Frankfurt won 6–1 on aggregate.

9 November 1988

Anderlecht (Belgium)	0–2	(Belgium) Mechelen
	Report	Koeman 17'; Ohana 46'

Constant Vanden Stock Stadium, Brussels
Attendance: 33,500
Referee: Karl-Heinz Tritschler (West Germany)

Mechelen won 3–0 on aggregate.

9 November 1988

Dinamo București (Romania)	1–1	(Scotland) Dundee United
Mateuț 82'	Report	Beaumont 79'

Stadionul Dinamo, Bucharest
Attendance: 16,300
Referee: Bep Thomas (Netherlands)

Dinamo București won 2–1 on aggregate.

9 November 1988

Sampdoria (Italy)	3–1	(East Germany) Carl Zeiss Jena
Vierchowod 25'; Toninho Cerezo 43'; Vialli 53'	Report	Raab 59'

Stadio Luigi Ferraris, Genoa
Attendance: 16,714
Referee: Bob Valentine (Scotland)

Sampdoria won 4–2 on aggregate.

== Quarter-finals ==
Team 1	Agg.	Team 2	1st leg	2nd leg
AGF (Denmark)	0–1	(Spain) Barcelona	0–1	0–0
CSKA Sofia (Bulgaria)	3–3 (4–3 p)	(Netherlands) Roda JC	2–1	1–2 (aet)
Eintracht Frankfurt (West Germany)	0–1	(Belgium) Mechelen	0–0	0–1
Dinamo București (Romania)	1–1 (a)	(Italy) Sampdoria	1–1	0–0

=== First leg ===
1 March 1989

AGF (Denmark)	0–1	(Spain) Barcelona
	Report	Lineker 70'

Århus Idrætspark, Århus
Attendance: 25,000
Referee: Jiří Stiegler (Czechoslovakia)

1 March 1989

CSKA Sofia (Bulgaria)	2–1	(Netherlands) Roda JC
Stoichkov 12'; Kostadinov 65'	Report	Boerebach 83'

Narodna Armia, Sofia
Attendance: 30,000
Referee: Kurt Röthlisberger (Switzerland)

1 March 1989

Eintracht Frankfurt (West Germany)	0–0	(Belgium) Mechelen
	Report

Waldstadion, Frankfurt
Attendance: 16,719
Referee: Bo Karlsson (Sweden)

1 March 1989

Dinamo București (Romania)	1–1	(Italy) Sampdoria
Vaișcovici 16' (pen.)	Report	Vialli 90'

Stadionul Dinamo, Bucharest
Attendance: 12,148
Referee: Horst Brummeier (Austria)

=== Second leg ===
15 March 1989

Barcelona (Spain)	0–0	(Denmark) AGF
	Report

Camp Nou, Barcelona
Attendance: 17,000
Referee: Gerasimos Germanakos (Greece)

Barcelona won 1–0 on aggregate.

15 March 1989

Roda JC (Netherlands)	2–1 (a.e.t.)	(Bulgaria) CSKA Sofia
Haan 38'; Van der Luer 50'	Report	Stoichkov 78'
Penalties
Van der Luer (penalty scored); Hanssen (penalty scored); Groenendijk (penalty missed); Haan (penalty scored); Boerebach (penalty missed)	3–4	(penalty missed) Penev; (penalty scored) Georgiev; (penalty scored) Ivanov; (penalty scored) Mladenov; (penalty scored) Stoichkov

Gemeentelijk Sportpark Kaalheide, Kerkrade
Attendance: 12,300
Referee: Peter Mikkelsen (Denmark)

3–3 on aggregate; CSKA won 4–3 on penalties.

15 March 1989

Mechelen (Belgium)	1–0	(West Germany) Eintracht Frankfurt
Wilmots 67'	Report

Achter de Kazerne, Mechelen
Attendance: 12,000
Referee: Alexey Spirin (Soviet Union)

Mechelen won 1–0 on aggregate.

15 March 1989

Sampdoria (Italy)	0–0	(Romania) Dinamo București
	Report

Stadio Giovanni Zini, Cremona
Attendance: 17,652
Referee: Lajos Németh (Hungary)

1–1 on aggregate; Sampdoria won on away goals.

== Semi-finals ==
Team 1	Agg.	Team 2	1st leg	2nd leg
Barcelona (Spain)	6–3	(Bulgaria) CSKA Sofia	4–2	2–1
Mechelen (Belgium)	2–4	(Italy) Sampdoria	2–1	0–3

=== First leg ===
5 April 1989

Barcelona (Spain)	4–2	(Bulgaria) CSKA Sofia
Lineker 36'; Amor 37'; Bakero 48'; Salinas 72'	Report	Stoichkov 24', 67' (pen.)

Camp Nou, Barcelona
Attendance: 24,000
Referee: Siegfried Kirschen (East Germany)

5 April 1989

Mechelen (Belgium)	2–1	(Italy) Sampdoria
Ohana 11'; Deferm 68'	Report	Vialli 75'

Achter de Kazerne, Mechelen
Attendance: 13,066
Referee: Bruno Galler (Switzerland)

=== Second leg ===
19 April 1989

CSKA Sofia (Bulgaria)	1–2	(Spain) Barcelona
Stoichkov 65'	Report	Lineker 25'; Amor 81'

Vasil Levski National Stadium, Sofia
Attendance: 45,000
Referee: Aron Schmidhuber (West Germany)

Barcelona won 6–3 on aggregate.

19 April 1989

Sampdoria (Italy)	3–0	(Belgium) Mechelen
Toninho Cerezo 68'; Dossena 85'; Salsano 88'	Report

Stadio Luigi Ferraris, Genoa
Attendance: 18,419
Referee: Jiří Stiegler (Czechoslovakia)

Sampdoria won 4–2 on aggregate.

== Final ==
10 May 1989

Barcelona (Spain)	2–0	(Italy) Sampdoria
Salinas 4'; López Rekarte 79'	Report

Stadion Wankdorf, Bern
Attendance: 42,707
Referee: George Courtney (England)

== Top scorers ==
Rank	Name	Team	Goals
1	(Bulgaria) Hristo Stoichkov	(Bulgaria) CSKA Sofia	7
2	(Bulgaria) Lyuboslav Penev	(Bulgaria) CSKA Sofia	6
3	(Spain) Roberto	(Spain) Barcelona	5
3	(Italy) Gianluca Vialli	(Italy) Sampdoria	5
5	(England) Jimmy Gilligan	(Wales) Cardiff City	4
5	(England) Gary Lineker	(Spain) Barcelona	4
5	(Denmark) Frank Pingel	(Denmark) AGF	4
5	(Romania) Claudiu Vaișcovici	(Romania) Dinamo București	4
9	(Netherlands) John Bosman	(Belgium) Mechelen	3
9	(Bulgaria) Emil Kostadinov	(Bulgaria) CSKA Sofia	3
9	(Denmark) Bjørn Kristensen	(Denmark) AGF	3
9	(Australia) Eddie Krnčević	(Belgium) Anderlecht	3
9	(Israel) Eli Ohana	(Belgium) Mechelen	3

== See also ==
- 1988–89 European Cup
- 1988–89 UEFA Cup
