= 1988–89 Ekstraklasa =

62nd season of top-tier football league in Poland

Liga
- Season: 1988–89
- Champions: Ruch Chorzów (14th title)
- Relegated: Pogoń Szczecin; GKS Jastrzębie; Górnik Wałbrzych; Szombierki Bytom
- Matches: 240
- Goals: 566 (2.36 per match)
- Top goalscorer: Krzysztof Warzycha (24 goals)
- Average attendance: 8,407 ▼14.6%

Statistics of Ekstraklasa for the 1988–89 season.

== Overview ==
It was contested by 16 teams, and Ruch Chorzów won the championship.

== League table ==
Pos	Team	Pld	W	3W	D	3L	L	GF	GA	GD	Pts	Qualification or relegation
1	Ruch Chorzów (C)	30	13	6	8	0	3	48	18	+30	52	Qualification to European Cup first round
2	GKS Katowice	30	11	6	8	1	4	50	24	+26	47	Qualification to UEFA Cup first round
3	Górnik Zabrze	30	11	6	5	0	8	55	29	+26	45	Qualification to UEFA Cup first round
4	Legia Warsaw	30	8	6	9	0	7	41	19	+22	43	Qualification to Cup Winners' Cup first round
5	Stal Mielec	30	12	1	7	1	9	35	27	+8	33	
6	Lech Poznań	30	8	3	10	2	7	39	32	+7	33	
7	Śląsk Wrocław	30	5	2	15	2	6	34	35	−1	29	
8	Widzew Łódź	30	9	0	12	1	8	27	27	0	29	
9	Jagiellonia Białystok	30	9	0	12	1	8	22	27	−5	29	
10	ŁKS Łódź	30	7	1	11	2	9	34	45	−11	26	
11	Olimpia Poznań	30	8	1	9	3	9	33	41	−8	25	
12	Wisła Kraków	30	7	3	6	6	8	35	48	−13	23	
13	Pogoń Szczecin (R)	30	5	1	10	4	10	34	50	−16	19	Qualification to Relegation playoffs
14	GKS Jastrzębie (R)	30	8	0	8	5	9	24	43	−19	19	Qualification to Relegation playoffs
15	Górnik Wałbrzych (R)	30	7	0	5	4	14	22	44	−22	15	Relegated to II liga
16	Szombierki Bytom (R)	30	4	0	9	4	13	33	57	−24	13	Relegated to II liga

Source: 90minut.pl (in Polish)
Rules for classification: 1st points; 2nd goal difference; 3rd goals scored. 1 extra point for each win with a goal difference of 3 or more, and 1 point deducted for each loss with a goal difference of 3 or more.
(C) Champion; (R) Relegated

== Results ==
Home \ Away	JAS	KAT	GWŁ	GÓR	JAG	LPO	LEG	ŁKS	OLP	POG	RUC	STA	SZB	ŚLĄ	WID	WIS
GKS Jastrzębie		1–1	2–0	0–1	0–0	0–2	1–1	0–0	1–2	3–2	0–3	2–0	1–0	2–0	1–0	4–2
GKS Katowice	3–0		1–0	3–2	0–1	4–1	1–0	7–2	1–1	2–0	0–0	3–0	1–1	2–0	2–1	1–0
Górnik Wałbrzych	2–1	0–1		0–2	2–0	1–1	1–0	2–1	1–2	1–1	0–2	0–1	1–1	1–1	0–1	2–1
Górnik Zabrze	2–0	3–0	1–0		2–2	2–1	2–1	1–0	4–2	3–0	1–2	1–0	8–3	1–1	1–0	4–0
Jagiellonia Białystok	0–0	1–1	2–0	1–1		1–4	1–1	1–3	0–0	1–0	1–1	1–0	1–0	1–0	0–1	0–0
Lech Poznań	3–0	2–2	1–1	2–0	1–0		0–2	1–1	1–2	2–0	1–2	1–0	0–0	1–1	1–1	3–0
Legia Warsaw	1–0	0–2	3–0	3–2	2–0	3–0		2–0	3–0	3–0	0–0	1–0	1–1	0–0	1–1	4–0
ŁKS Łódź	1–1	0–2	3–0	1–1	0–1	1–3	2–1		2–1	2–1	2–2	0–0	1–1	1–1	1–0	2–1
Olimpia Poznań	1–0	0–3	0–2	0–3	1–1	2–1	2–1	0–0		2–2	3–1	0–1	1–2	1–1	0–0	3–0
Pogoń Szczecin	2–0	1–1	4–1	1–4	1–0	1–1	0–3	1–2	3–2		0–0	2–1	1–0	2–1	1–1	1–1
Ruch Chorzów	5–0	1–1	4–1	2–0	1–0	1–0	1–0	1–0	2–1	1–1		0–2	2–1	3–0	4–0	1–0
Stal Mielec	0–1	2–0	2–1	0–0	2–0	1–0	1–2	3–3	0–0	2–0	2–0		3–1	3–0	2–2	3–2
Szombierki Bytom	2–2	0–3	2–0	1–3	0–1	2–3	0–1	2–0	1–2	3–2	0–1	2–3		3–3	3–3	0–3
Śląsk Wrocław	6–1	1–0	1–0	1–0	2–2	1–2	0–0	1–1	1–0	2–2	0–1	1–1	1–1		0–2	0–0
Widzew Łódź	0–0	0–1	1–0	1–0	1–1	0–0	0–0	3–1	2–1	1–0	0–0	0–0	2–0	1–2		1–2
Wisła Kraków	1–0	3–1	1–2	1–0	0–1	0–0	1–1	4–1	1–1	4–2	1–4	1–0	3–0	0–5	2–1	

Source: 90minut.pl (in Polish)
Legend: Blue = home team win; Yellow = draw; Red = away team win.

== Relegation playoffs ==
After the end of the season, play-offs played for two places in the first league in the 1989–90 season between teams from places 13-14 in the first league and runners-up in the 2nd league groups:

- 13th team of the I league and 2nd team of the II league of group II - Pogoń Szczecin and Motor Lublin,
- 14th team of the I league and 2nd team of the II league of group I - GKS Jastrzębie and Zawisza Bydgoszcz.

Team 1	Agg.	Team 2	1st leg	2nd leg
Pogoń Szczecin	3–4	Motor Lublin	3–2	0–2
GKS Jastrzębie	0–2	Zawisza Bydgoszcz	0–0	0–2

Pogoń Szczecin and GKS Jastrzębie did not hold places at the highest league level.

== Top goalscorers ==
Rank	Player	Club	Goals
1	(Poland) Krzysztof Warzycha	Ruch Chorzów	24
2	(Poland) Jan Urban	Górnik Zabrze	13
2	(Poland) Ryszard Cyroń	Górnik Zabrze	13
4	(Poland) Bogusław Cygan	Szombierki Bytom	12
5	(Poland) Maciej Śliwowski	Stal Mielec	11
5	(Poland) Mirosław Kubisztal	GKS Katowice	11
5	(Poland) Bogusław Pachelski	Lech Poznań	11
8	(Poland) Jacek Cyzio	Pogoń Szczecin	10
8	(Poland) Jarosław Araszkiewicz	Lech Poznań	10
8	(Poland) Jerzy Kaziów	Olimpia Poznań	10
8	(Poland) Marek Filipczak	Olimpia Poznań	10

== Attendances ==
#	Club	Average
1	Jagiellonia Białystok	19,659
2	Ruch Chorzów	14,133
3	Stal Mielec	11,701
4	Górnik Zabrze	11,567
5	Wisła Kraków	10,133
6	Lech Poznań	9,310
7	Legia Warszawa	9,145
8	Śląsk Wrocław	8,391
9	GKS Katowice	7,278
10	GKS Jastrzębie	7,139
11	ŁKS	5,550
12	Pogoń Szczecin	4,811
13	Widzew Łódź	4,794
14	Olimpia Poznań	3,949
15	Górnik Wałbrzych	3,607
16	Szombierki Bytom	3,336
