= Boerebach =

Boerebach is a surname. Notable people with the surname include:

- Michel Boerebach (born 1963), Dutch footballer
- Mark Boerebach, Australian savant
