= Oleg Ivanov (footballer, born 1967) =

Russian footballer

Personal information
- Full name: Oleg Viktorovich Ivanov
- Date of birth: 29 July 1967 (age 59)
- Place of birth: Skhodnya, Russian SFSR
- Height: 1.78 m (5 ft 10 in)
- Positions: Midfielder; striker

Senior career*
Years	Team	Apps	(Gls)
1988	FC Krasnaya Presnya Moscow	35	(7)
1989	FC Spartak Moscow (reserves)		
1989	FC Krasnaya Presnya Moscow	14	(3)
1990–1992	FC Spartak Moscow	20	(2)
1992–1993	TPV	66	(23)
1994	FC Ilves	7	(1)
1994–1995	FC Haka	32	(12)
1995–1996	Ikast FS	6	(0)
1996–2000	FC Haka	115	(25)
2000	Kotkan TP	2	(0)
2001	FC Lahti	5	(0)
2001–2002	FC Haka	23	(1)
2002	FC Hämeenlinna	3	(0)
- * Club domestic league appearances and goals

Oleg Viktorovich Ivanov (Russian: Олег Викторович Иванов; born 29 July 1967) is a retired Russian professional footballer.

== Club career ==
He made his professional debut in the Soviet Second League in 1988 for FC Krasnaya Presnya Moscow. He played 2 seasons in the Soviet Top League for FC Spartak Moscow.

== Honours ==
- Soviet Top League runner-up: 1991.
- Soviet Cup winner: 1992.
- Veikkausliiga champion: 1995, 1998, 1999, 2000.
- Finnish Cup winner: 1997.

== European club competitions ==
- European Cup 1990–91 with FC Spartak Moscow: 4 games, 1 goal.
- UEFA Cup 1991–92 with FC Spartak Moscow: 2 games.
- UEFA Champions League 2001–02 with FC Haka: 2 games in the 3rd qualification round.
