= Patrick Morocutti =

Luxembourgish footballer

Personal information
- Date of birth: 19 February 1968 (age 58)
- Height: 1.77 m (5 ft 10 in)
- Position: Forward

Senior career*
Years	Team	Apps	(Gls)
1986–1994	Union Luxembourg	198	(158)
1994–2000	Jeunesse Esch	124	(65)
2000–2001	Union Luxembourg	21	(0)

International career
1988–1996	Luxembourg	19	(0)

Managerial career
- 2011-2012: US Mondorf-les-Bains
- * Club domestic league appearances and goals

Patrick Morocutti (born 19 February 1968) is a Luxembourgish retired football striker. He became Luxembourg National Division top goalscorer in 1987–88 and 1990–91. He scored 223 goals in 343 league matches for Union Luxembourg and Jeunesse Esch.

He replaced Jacques Müller in the hot seat at US Mondorf-les-Bains in March 2011, alongside Gilbert Freis.

== International career ==
Morocutti made his debut for Luxembourg in an April 1988 friendly match against Italy and earned a total of 19 caps (no goals). His final international was a February 1996 friendly against Morocco.
