= Mark Boerebach =

Australian savant

Mark Boerebach is an Australian savant, able to recall Australian music chart top hits from the 1970s and 1980s. He is known for having founded and run the Internet radio station 2PR FM in Sydney (2009-2016), and for his appearance on TV game show RocKwiz in 2008.

== Early life and education ==
Mark Boerebach was born blind and diagnosed with Asperger syndrome as a child. Prior to entering school, he underwent a series of operations which restored 20% of his eyesight, although he is blind in one eye.

His condition made it difficult for him to socialise at school, but despite the difficulties he encountered, Boerebach has completed five TAFE music business courses.

== Career ==
In 2009, Boerebach founded an Internet radio station called 2PR FM based in Sydney, which played continuous 1970s and 1980s pop music.

He has been described as having the ability to instantly list all the songs on a particular chart from any given week in the 1980s and is able to recall roughly 15 years of Australian music chart top hits, an ability that has been reported as one result of his Asperger syndrome. One of Boerebach's teachers at TAFE, Russell Kilby, contacted him after reading about him in local papers, and encouraged him to try out for the RocKwiz television game show on SBS Television. Fellow students helped raise funds for the trip to Melbourne to try out for the show, and after passing the public eliminations at The Espy in St Kilda, and meeting with Glenn Baker, the three-time winner of the BBC's "Rock Brain of the Universe", he appeared on the RocKwiz in November 2008.

In 2018, Borebach announced on the 2PR FM website that the station was "currently in a indefinite sabbatical and will be for some time to come, if not permanently", after "ceasing transmission at midnight of Wednesday 1st June 2016".

== Documentary ==
A documentary of his preparations for and appearance on the game show was aired under the name Rainman goes to RocKwiz and was shown at the Anchorage International Film Festival in 2010. In 2011, the documentary won an Aloha Accolade at the Honolulu Films Awards.
