= Damian Łukasik =

Polish footballer

Personal information
- Date of birth: 26 February 1964 (age 62)
- Place of birth: Poniec, Poland
- Height: 1.94 m (6 ft 4 in)
- Position: Defender

Team information
- Current team: Iskra Szydłowo (manager)

Youth career
- Polonia Leszno

Senior career*
| Years | Team | Apps | (Gls) |
| 1983–1993 | Lech Poznań | 218 | (13) |
| 1994–1995 | Hapoel Tel Aviv | 64 | (2) |
| 1996 | Groclin Dyskobolia Grodzisk | | |
| 1997–1998 | Lech Poznań | 28 | (1) |

International career
| 1985–1990 | Poland | 27 | (0) |

Managerial career
- 2001–2002: Huragan Pobiedziska
- 2002–2003: Victoria Września
- 2003–2007: Sparta Szamotuły
- 2007–2012: Lech Poznań (youth)
- 2012–2013: Górnik Konin
- 2013: Sparta Konin
- 2014–2015: Sparta Szamotuły
- 2015: Drwęca Nowe Miasto Lubawskie
- 2016: MKS Ełk
- 2016–2017: Huragan Pobiedziska
- 2018: Orkan Konarzewo
- 2018: Pelikan Niechanowo
- 2019: Drwęca Nowe Miasto Lubawskie
- 2020–2021: Lech Rypin
- 2021: Sparta Brodnica
- 2022–: Iskra Szydłowo
- * Club domestic league appearances and goals

Damian Łukasik (born 26 February 1964) is a Polish football manager and former player who played as a defender.

== Honours ==
Lech Poznań

- Ekstraklasa: 1982–83, 1983–84, 1989–90, 1992–93
- Polish Cup: 1983–84, 1987–88

Individual

- Lech Poznań All-time XI
