= Marek Rzepka =

Polish footballer

Personal information
- Date of birth: 6 January 1964 (age 62)
- Place of birth: Płock, Poland
- Height: 1.82 m (6 ft 0 in)
- Position: Defender

Senior career*
Years	Team	Apps	(Gls)
1976–1983	Wisła Płock		
1983–1986	Zawisza Bydgoszcz		
1986–1995	Lech Poznań	272	(5)
1995–1996	Sokół Tychy	24	(1)
1996	Unia Swarzędz		
1997	GKS Bełchatów	13	(0)
2005–2011	Lech Poznań (oldboys)		
2011	Kolejorz Poznań		
2012–2013	Lech Poznań (oldboys)		

International career
1991–1993	Poland	15	(1)
- * Club domestic league appearances and goals

Marek Rzepka (born 6 January 1964) is a Polish former professional footballer who played as a defender.

== Career ==
Rzepka's biggest career club successes were with Lech Poznań, winning the title three times (1990, 1992 and 1993), the Polish Cup once (1988) and the Polish Super Cup twice (1990 and 1992).

He played in 15 matches for the Poland national team from 1991 to 1993. He was the first Lech player to ever captain the national team.

== Honours ==
Lech Poznań

- Ekstraklasa: 1989–90, 1991–92, 1992–93
- Polish Cup: 1987–88
- Polish Super Cup: 1990, 1992

Individual

- Lech Poznań All-time XI
