= Czesław Jakołcewicz =

Polish footballer (born 1961)

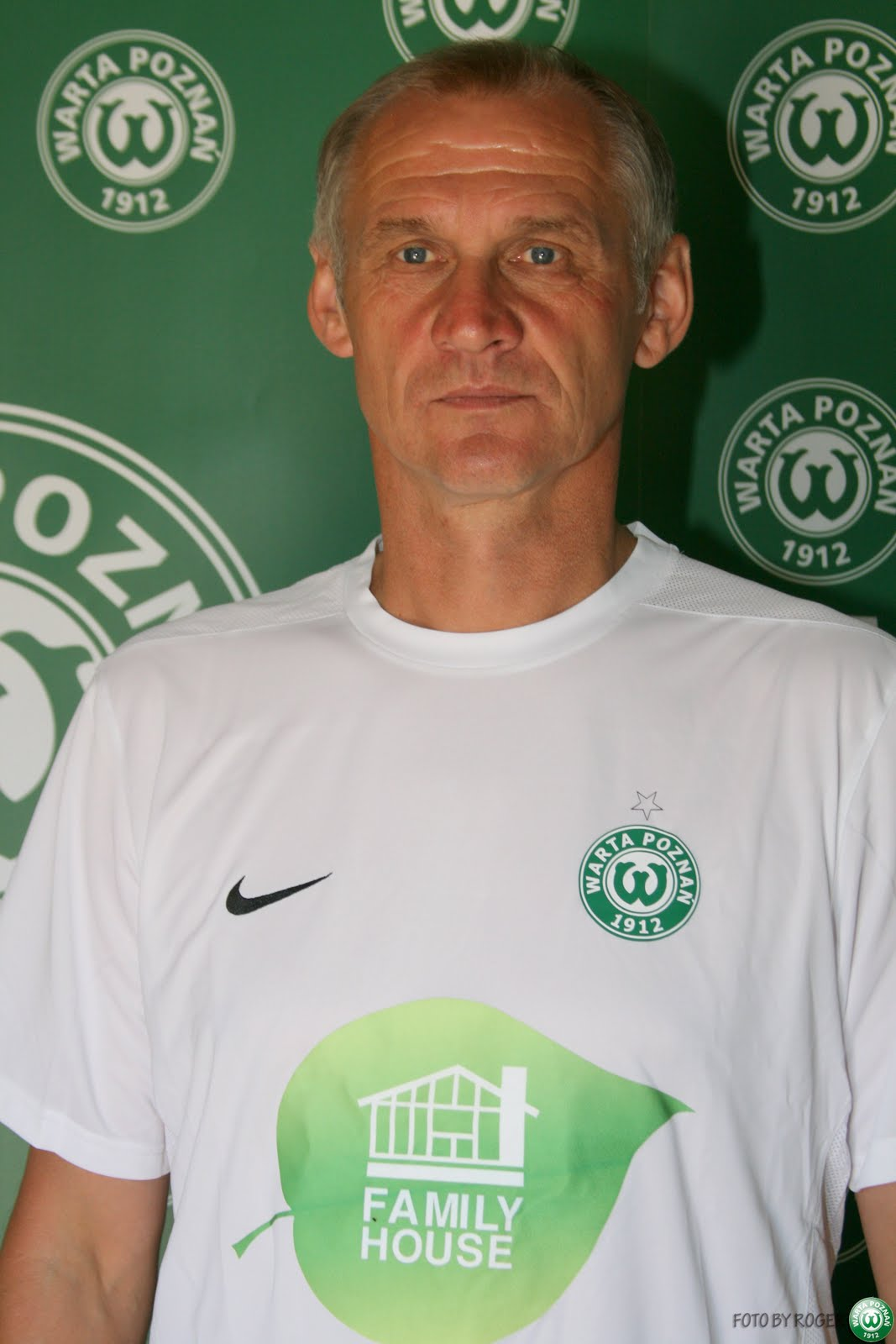

Personal information
- Date of birth: 18 August 1961 (age 65)
- Place of birth: Cedynia, Poland
- Height: 1.85 m (6 ft 1 in)
- Position: Defender

Youth career
- –1976: Czcibor Cedynia
- 1976–1978: Arkonia Szczecin

Senior career*
Years	Team	Apps	(Gls)
1978–1983	Stal Stocznia Szczecin		
1983–1990	Lech Poznań	199	(16)
1990–1991	Fenerbahçe	17	(3)
1991–1992	OB	7	(0)
1992–1993	Lech Poznań	1	(0)
1993	Sokół Pniewy		
1993–1996	Warta Poznań	79	(3)
1996–1997	Chrobry Głogów	12	(0)
1997–1998	Warta Poznań	22	(2)
1999–2001	Huragan Pobiedziska		

International career
1984–1991	Poland	15	(0)

Managerial career
- 2000–2001: Huragan Pobiedziska (player-manager)
- 2002: Lech Poznań (caretaker)
- 2003–2004: Kujawiak Włocławek
- 2004–2006: Unia Janikowo
- 2006–2007: ŁKS Łomża
- 2007: Wisła Płock
- 2008: ŁKS Łomża
- 2008: Stilon Gorzów Wielkopolski
- 2009–2011: KSZO Ostrowiec Świętokrzyski
- 2011: Warta Poznań
- 2016–2017: Mieszko Gniezno
- 2017–2018: Victoria Września
- 2019–2020: NKS Niepruszewo
- * Club domestic league appearances and goals

Czesław Jakołcewicz (born 18 August 1961) is a Polish professional football manager and former player. He managed many teams throughout Poland and played for the Poland national team.

== Honours ==
Lech Poznań

- Ekstraklasa: 1983–84, 1989–90, 1992–93
- Polish Cup: 1983–84, 1987–88
- Polish Super Cup: 1990
