= Andrew Waddell (referee) =

Scottish football referee (born 1950)

- Full name: Andrew Wilson Waddell
- Born: 26 September 1950 (age 76)

Domestic
Years	League	Role
1973–1999	Scottish Premier League, Scottish Football League	Referee

International
Years	League	Role
1989–1997	FIFA–listed	Referee

Andrew Wilson Waddell (born 26 September 1950) became a qualified referee in 1965 and joined the Senior List of SFA referees in 1973. From 1989 to 1997 he represented Scotland on the FIFA list of international referees, including qualifying matches for the 1994 World Cup. He also served as an assistant referee at UEFA Euro 1988 and the 1989 FIFA U-16 World Championship. He retired from refereeing in 1999 and subsequently became secretary of Preston Athletic F.C., and campaigned for the club to be admitted to the Scottish Football League in 2008.

Waddell was the Chairman of the Scottish Lowland Football League until replaced by George Fraser and sat on the Professional Game Board of the Scottish Football Association (SFA).

Professionally he is managing director of a Quality Assurance consultancy and is past Chairman of the British Association for Research Quality Assurance (BARQA)
