= Andrzej Juskowiak =

Polish footballer (born 1970)

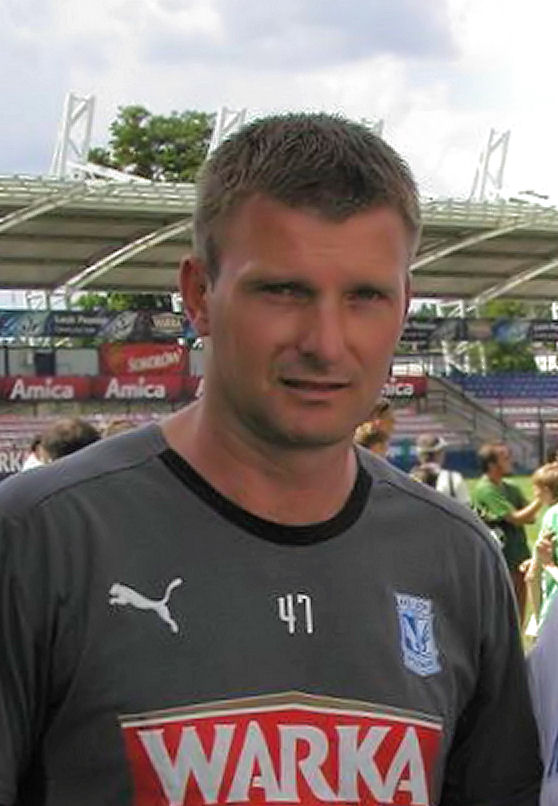
- Juskowiak in 2009

Personal information
- Full name: Andrzej Mieczysław Juskowiak
- Date of birth: 3 November 1970 (age 55)
- Place of birth: Gostyń, Poland
- Height: 1.84 m (6 ft 1/2 in)
- Position: Forward

Team information
- Current team: TPS Winogrady Poznań (chairman); Lech Poznań (scout)

Senior career*
Years	Team	Apps	(Gls)
1987	Kania Gostyń		
1987–1992	Lech Poznań	95	(43)
1992–1995	Sporting CP	74	(25)
1995–1996	→ Olympiacos (loan)	25	(12)
1996–1998	Borussia Mönchengladbach	52	(12)
1998–2002	VfL Wolfsburg	108	(39)
2002–2003	Energie Cottbus	24	(5)
2003	MetroStars	5	(1)
2004–2007	Erzgebirge Aue	110	(33)
Total		493	(170)

International career
1992	Poland Olympic	6	(7)
1992–2001	Poland	39	(13)
Medal record
Representing Poland
Men's football
Olympic Games
Silver medal – second place	1992 Barcelona	Team
- * Club domestic league appearances and goals

Andrzej Mieczysław Juskowiak (born 3 November 1970) is a Polish football pundit and former professional player who played as a forward. He currently serves as the chairman of TPS Winogrady Poznań and works as a scout for Ekstraklasa club Lech Poznań.

== Career ==
Nicknamed "Jusko", he was the top scorer at the 1992 Summer Olympics, where Poland won the silver medal. He debuted for the Poland national team in May 1992 against Sweden, playing a total of 39 matches and scoring 13 goals.

Juskowiak is said to be the only Pole who played for Sporting CP.

== Career statistics ==
=== International ===
Appearances and goals by national team and year
National team	Year	Apps	Goals
Poland	1992	3	0
Poland	1993	2	0
Poland	1994	4	2
Poland	1995	8	7
Poland	1996	3	0
Poland	1997	5	3
Poland	1998	4	1
Poland	1999	5	0
Poland	2000	3	0
Poland	2001	2	0
Total		39	13

Scores and results list Poland's goal tally first, score column indicates score after each Juskowiak goal.

List of international goals scored by Andrzej Juskowiak
No.	Date	Venue	Opponent	Score	Result	Competition	Ref.
1	17 May 1994	GKS Katowice Stadium, Chorzów, Poland	Austria	1–1	3–4	Friendly	
2	12 October 1994	Stadion Stali Mielec, Mielec, Poland	Azerbaijan	1–0	1–0	UEFA Euro 1996 qualifying	
3	29 March 1995	Stadionul Steaua, Bucharest, Romania	Romania	1–0	1–2	UEFA Euro 1996 qualifying	
4	25 April 1995	Arena Zabrze, Zabrze, Poland	Israel	2–2	4–3	UEFA Euro 1996 qualifying	
5	7 June 1995	Arena Zabrze, Zabrze, Poland	Slovakia	1–0	5–0	UEFA Euro 1996 qualifying	
6	7 June 1995	Arena Zabrze, Zabrze, Poland	Slovakia	5–0	5–0	UEFA Euro 1996 qualifying	
7	29 June 1995	Estádio do Arruda, Recife, Brazil	Brazil	1–2	1–2	Friendly	
8	16 August 1995	Parc des Princes, Paris, France	France	1–0	1–1	UEFA Euro 1996 qualifying	
9	11 October 1995	Tehelné pole, Bratislava, Slovakia	Slovakia	1–0	1–4	UEFA Euro 1996 qualifying	
10	7 October 1997	Republican Stadium, Chișinău, Moldova	Moldova	1–0	3–0	1998 FIFA World Cup qualification	
11	7 October 1997	Republican Stadium, Chișinău, Moldova	Moldova	2–0	3–0	1998 FIFA World Cup qualification	
12	7 October 1997	Republican Stadium, Chișinău, Moldova	Moldova	3–0	3–0	1998 FIFA World Cup qualification	
13	10 October 1998	Polish Army Stadium, Warsaw, Poland	Luxembourg	2–0	3–0	UEFA Euro 2000 qualifying	

== Honours ==
Lech Poznań

- Ekstraklasa: 1989–90, 1991–92
- Polish Super Cup: 1990

Sporting CP

- Taça de Portugal: 1994–95

Poland Olympic

- Olympic silver medal: 1992

Individual

- Ekstraklasa top scorer: 1989–90
- Olympic top scorer: 1992
