= Patrik Sundström (footballer) =

Swedish footballer

Personal information
- Full name: Dan Patrik Sundström
- Date of birth: 12 August 1970 (age 56)
- Height: 1.84 m (6 ft 0 in)
- Position: Midfielder

Senior career*
Years	Team	Apps	(Gls)
1989	Högaborgs BK		
1990–1992	Malmö FF	28	(1)
1993–1997	Helsingborgs IF		
1998–2002	Landskrona BoIS		

International career
1988–1989	Sweden U19	7	(1)
1990–1991	Sweden U21	5	(0)
- * Club domestic league appearances and goals

Dan Patrik Sundström (born 12 August 1970) is a Swedish former footballer who played as a midfielder.
