= Gemeentelijk Sportpark Kaalheide =

Football stadium in Kerkrade, Netherlands

Coordinates: 50°51′39.34″N 6°02′19.33″E

- Kaalheide
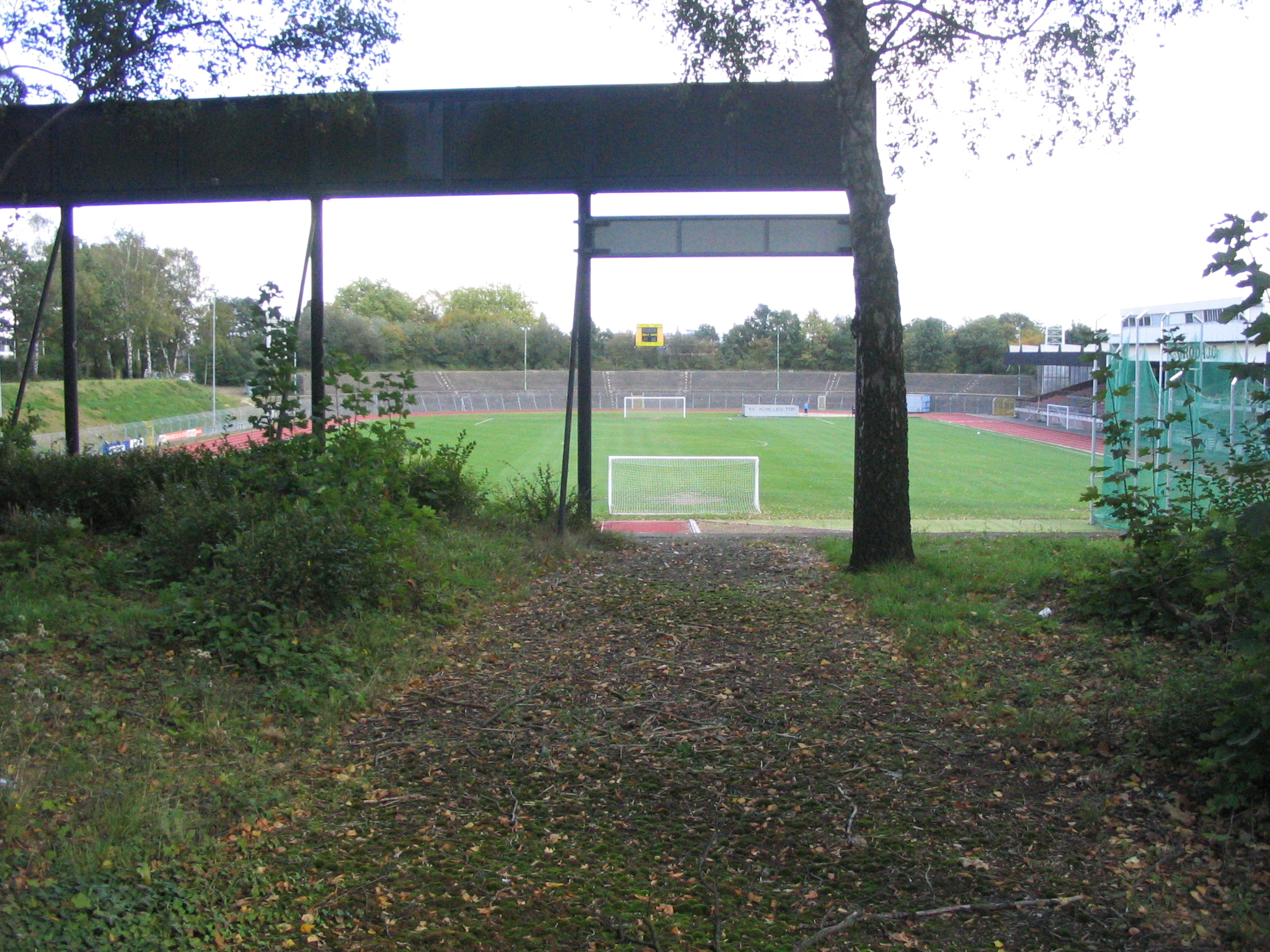
- Interactive map of Gemeentelijk Sportpark Kaalheide
- Location: Kerkrade
- Owner: Municipality Kerkrade
- Capacity: 14,000
- Surface: Grass

Construction
- Built: 1946-1950
- Opened: 1950

Tenants
- Juliana (Kerkrade, 1952–1954); Rapid’54 (Heerlen, 1954); Rapid JC (Heerlen, 1954–1962); Roda JC (Kerkrade, 1962–2000); Jong Roda JC (2008-....)

The Gemeentelijk Sportpark Kaalheide is a stadium situated in Kerkrade, Netherlands. It is the former stadium of Roda JC, who since 2000 play in the Parkstad Limburg Stadion. It is still in use for youth and Jong Roda JC (U21) matches.
