= Michel Boerebach =

Dutch footballer (born 1963)

Personal information
- Full name: Michel Boerebach
- Date of birth: 27 September 1963 (age 63)
- Place of birth: Amsterdam, Netherlands
- Position: Midfielder

Team information
- Current team: Go Ahead Eagles (ass. coach)

Youth career
- SV Lelystad'67

Senior career*
Years	Team	Apps	(Gls)
1982–1987	Go Ahead Eagles	129	(22)
1987–1989	Roda JC	66	(21)
1989–1990	PSV	18	(3)
1991–1992	Roda JC	61	(5)
1992–1993	Burgos	28	(3)
1993–1996	FC Twente	88	(24)
1996–1998	Go Ahead Eagles	26	(2)
Total		416	(80)

International career
1984-1985	Netherlands U-21	11	(2)
1984-1987	Netherlands U-23	4	(0)

Managerial career
- Go Ahead Eagles (assistant)
- * Club domestic league appearances and goals

Michel Boerebach (born September 27, 1963 in Amsterdam, North Holland) is a retired football midfielder from the Netherlands, who is the current assistant-coach of Dutch club where he started his professional career, Go Ahead Eagles.

== Club career ==
A talented midfielder with Go Ahead Eagles, Boerebach left the club after 5 years for Roda JC and had an unsuccessful spell at PSV Eindhoven. Dutch manager Theo Vonk took him to La Liga side Real Burgos in 1992 , only for him to leave the club after relegation. He returned to Holland to play for FC Twente and a second spell at Go Ahead Eagles. He then played amateur football for DOVO and retired in 1999.

== International career ==
Boerebach played 11 gaems for the Netherlands national under-21 football team and another 4 for the Olympic team.

== Managerial career ==
After retiring as a player, Boerebach coached the reserves team at De Graafschap and became assistant manager at Go Ahead Eagles. In February 2016 he was allowed by the Dutch FA to act as caretaker manager of their senior side for a month alongside Harry Decheiver, after Dennis Demmers was sacked.

== Personal life ==
On 22 July 2003, Boerebach lost both his sons Lesley and Sven in a car accident near Dronten, his then wife Dora survived the crash. A youth football tournament was named in honour of Lesley and a children's farm in honour of Sven. Boerebach later wrote a book about their death, Nooit meer zaterdag (Never again Saturday). In 2007, his third son was born.
