= Bogusław Pachelski =

Polish footballer

Personal information
- Date of birth: 10 June 1962 (age 64)
- Place of birth: Płock, Poland
- Height: 1.74 m (5 ft 8 1/2 in)
- Position: Forward

Youth career
- Masovia Płock
- Stal Płock
- –1980: Stoczniowiec Płock

Senior career*
Years	Team	Apps	(Gls)
1980–1984	Wisła Płock		
1984–1985	Gwardia Warsaw		
1985–1990	Lech Poznań	149	(41)
1991	Adanaspor	6	(0)
1992	Perpignan FC		
1992–1993	Olimpia Poznań	18	(4)
1993	SV Lurup 23 Hamburg		
1994–1995	Petrochemia Płock		
1996–1997	NKS Niepruszewo		
- * Club domestic league appearances and goals

Bogusław Pachelski (born 10 June 1962) is a Polish former professional footballer who played as a forward.

== Club career ==
Pachelski had a brief spell in the Turkish Super Lig with Adanaspor and six seasons in the Ekstraklasa with Lech Poznań.

== Honours ==
Lech Poznań

- Ekstraklasa: 1989–90
- Polish Cup: 1987–88
- Polish Super Cup: 1990

Individual

- II liga top scorer: 1984–85
