= Jerzy Kaziów =

Polish footballer (1963–2022)

Personal information
- Full name: Jerzy Emil Kaziów
- Date of birth: 15 April 1963
- Place of birth: Jawor, Poland
- Date of death: 29 October 2022 (aged 59)
- Height: 1.79 m (5 ft 10 in)
- Position: Striker

Youth career
- Karkonosze Jelenia Góra

Senior career*
Years	Team	Apps	(Gls)
- Karkonosze Jelenia Góra
1984–1986	Gwardia Szczytno		
1986–1990	Olimpia Poznań	33	(117)
1991	Gefle IF		
1992–1993	Warta Poznań	46	(25)
1993–1994	Amica Wronki		
1994–1995	FC Solothurn	11	(0)
1995	Intrat Wałcz		
1995	Sokół Tychy	1	(0)
1996–1999	Dyskobolia Grodzisk Wielkopolski	79+	(35+)
1999	Pogoń Świebodzin		
2000	Olimpia Poznań		
2001	Aluminium Konin		

Managerial career
- 2005–2008: Piast Kobylnica
- * Club domestic league appearances and goals

Jerzy Emil Kaziów (15 April 1963 – 29 October 2022) was a Polish footballer who played as a striker.

== Playing career ==
Kaziów started his career as an 18 years old in then third division Karkonosze Jelenia Góra, where he was spotted by Zenon Jarzębski and brought to Olimpia Poznań, although he was already a player for Gwardia Szczytno by that time.

He then went to Sweden for one year, where at second division club Gefle IF he became the league's top scorer with 12 goals.

After returning from Sweden, he joined Warta Poznań in early 1992, where he played for a season and a half, until the end of the 1992–93 season. He played 46 matches, scoring 25 goals, and was a key force in the team that won promotion to the Ekstraklasa, earning a reputation as a prolific striker, particularly good at headers. It was thanks to two goals from Jerzy Kaziów that Warta Poznań defeated Stilon Gorzów Wielkopolski 3–2, celebrating their return to the Ekstraklasa with four games remaining.

Overall, he played for Gwardia Szczytno, Olimpia Poznań, Gefle IF, Warta Poznań, Amica Wronki, FC Solothurn, Orzeł Wałcz, Sokół Tychy, Dyskobolia Grodzisk Wielkopolski, Pogoń Świebodzin, as well as Aluminium Konin. In the Ekstraklasa he played 142 matches (117 for Olimpia, 1 for Sokół, and 24 for Dyskobolia) and scored 39 goals (33 for Olimpia and 6 for Dyskobolia).

== Enforcement career ==
From 1983 to 1986, Kaziów was an officer of the Citizens' Militia, and from 1986 to 1990, an officer of the Security Service with the rank of second lieutenant.
