= 1989–90 Ekstraklasa =

63rd season of top-tier football league in Poland

Liga
- Season: 1989–90
- Champions: Lech Poznań (3rd title)
- Relegated: Widzew Łódź; Jagiellonia Białystok
- Matches: 240
- Goals: 484 (2.02 per match)
- Top goalscorer: Andrzej Juskowiak (18 goals)
- Average attendance: 7,404 ▼11.9%

Statistics of Ekstraklasa for the 1989–90 season.

== Overview ==
It was contested by 16 teams, and Lech Poznań won the championship.

== League table ==
Pos	Team	Pld	W	3W	D	3L	L	GF	GA	GD	Pts	Qualification or relegation
1	Lech Poznań (C)	30	8	5	12	1	4	45	25	+20	42	Qualification to European Cup first round
2	Zagłębie Lubin	30	12	2	10	0	6	37	23	+14	40	Qualification to UEFA Cup first round
3	GKS Katowice	30	10	2	14	0	4	31	17	+14	40	Qualification to UEFA Cup first round
4	Zawisza Bydgoszcz	30	9	4	7	0	10	36	25	+11	37	
5	Olimpia Poznań	30	10	2	10	0	8	35	22	+13	36	
6	Górnik Zabrze	30	12	1	10	1	6	37	27	+10	36	
7	Legia Warsaw	30	10	0	16	1	3	27	18	+9	35	Qualification to Cup Winners' Cup first round
8	ŁKS Łódź	30	11	1	10	1	7	35	30	+5	34	
9	Wisła Kraków	30	5	3	12	0	10	32	34	−2	31	
10	Śląsk Wrocław	30	6	2	10	1	11	30	34	−4	27	
11	Stal Mielec	30	6	2	10	2	10	27	37	−10	26	
12	Ruch Chorzów	30	4	4	9	4	9	31	36	−5	25	
13	Motor Lublin	30	6	0	13	4	7	18	35	−17	21	
14	Zagłębie Sosnowiec	30	6	0	12	4	8	22	36	−14	20	
15	Widzew Łódź (R)	30	4	0	12	3	11	22	39	−17	17	Relegated to II liga
16	Jagiellonia Białystok (R)	29	3	0	13	6	7	19	45	−26	13	Relegated to II liga

Source: 90minut.pl (in Polish)
Rules for classification: 1st points; 2nd goal difference; 3rd goals scored. 1 extra point for each win with a goal difference of 3 or more, and 1 point deducted for each loss with a goal difference of 3 or more.
(C) Champion; (R) Relegated

== Results ==
Home \ Away	KAT	GÓR	JAG	LPO	LEG	ŁKS	MOL	OLP	RUC	STA	ŚLĄ	WID	WIS	ZLU	ZSO	ZAW
GKS Katowice		1–0	3–0	1–1	0–0	0–1	2–0	2–1	2–0	2–0	2–1	1–0	2–1	1–1	0–0	2–1
Górnik Zabrze	1–0		1–0	0–1	1–1	0–1	2–0	3–1	3–0	2–1	2–0	2–2	2–0	1–1	1–1	2–0
Jagiellonia Białystok	0–0	1–1		1–1	0–0	1–2	1–1	0–2	0–0	2–2	1–1	2–1	0–3	1–2	1–1	2–0
Lech Poznań	1–1	3–0	3–0		1–1	1–1	4–0	1–1	2–0	6–1	3–0	0–0	2–0	3–1	0–0	1–5
Legia Warsaw	0–0	0–0	2–0	1–1		0–1	2–0	1–0	2–2	1–1	2–0	3–1	0–3	0–0	1–0	1–0
ŁKS Łódź	2–1	1–2	0–0	1–0	1–3		1–1	2–2	2–1	2–0	1–1	1–0	0–0	1–0	4–0	0–0
Motor Lublin	2–2	0–2	1–1	0–2	0–0	1–1		0–0	0–0	0–0	1–0	2–0	2–0	1–0	1–0	0–0
Olimpia Poznań	0–0	1–0	4–0	0–1	2–0	1–0	1–0		2–0	1–1	1–1	1–1	1–1	1–1	3–0	2–0
Ruch Chorzów	0–3	2–0	3–0	1–2	0–0	4–1	4–0	2–1		0–0	0–1	1–2	1–1	2–0	0–0	0–3
Stal Mielec	0–1	3–3	1–0	0–1	0–0	1–0	3–0	2–1	1–0		1–1	4–1	2–1	1–2	0–2	1–0
Śląsk Wrocław	2–0	2–2	3–0	1–1	1–0	1–2	1–3	0–1	2–2	0–0		2–1	2–0	0–2	2–1	0–1
Widzew Łódź	1–1	3–1	1–2	1–0	1–1	1–1	0–0	1–0	0–3	0–0	0–0		1–1	0–1	1–1	0–0
Wisła Kraków	0–0	0–1	1–1	1–1	0–0	3–2	1–1	1–1	3–0	2–1	1–1	1–0		2–1	1–2	2–1
Zagłębie Lubin	1–1	0–0	2–0	2–0	2–2	2–1	3–0	0–1	1–1	3–0	2–1	1–0	1–1		1–0	1–0
Zagłębie Sosnowiec	0–0	1–2	1–1	2–2	0–1	1–1	0–0	0–1	2–0	2–0	0–3	2–1	2–1	0–2		1–1
Zawisza Bydgoszcz	0–0	0–0	2–1	2–0	0–2	2–1	2–1	2–1	0–2	2–0	1–0	4–1	2–0	1–1	4–0	

Source: 90minut.pl (in Polish)
Legend: Blue = home team win; Yellow = draw; Red = away team win.

== Top goalscorers ==
Rank	Player	Club	Goals
1	(Poland) Andrzej Juskowiak	Lech Poznań	18
2	(Poland) Ryszard Cyroń	Górnik Zabrze	15
3	(Poland) Krzysztof Warzycha	Ruch Chorzów	12
3	(Poland) Janusz Kudyba	Zagłębie Lubin	12
5	(Poland) Kazimierz Moskal	Wisla Kraków	11
6	(Poland) Maciej Śliwowski	Stal Mielec	10
7	(Poland) Jacek Ziober	ŁKS Łódź	9
7	(Poland) Jacek Bayer	Widzew Łódź	9
7	(Poland) Piotr Nowak	Zawisza Bydgoszcz	9
7	(Poland) Jerzy Kaziów	Olimpia Poznań	9

== Attendances ==
#	Club	Average
1	Zawisza Bydgoszcz	15,811
2	Zagłębie Lubin	10,897
3	Legia Warszawa	10,137
4	Wisła Kraków	8,400
5	Motor Lublin	8,361
6	Zagłębie Sosnowiec	8,140
7	Górnik Zabrze	7,187
8	Jagiellonia Białystok	7,108
9	Lech Poznań	6,997
10	Śląsk Wrocław	6,762
11	Stal Mielec	6,129
12	Ruch Chorzów	5,367
13	GKS Katowice	5,231
14	Widzew Łódź	4,536
15	ŁKS	4,239
16	Olimpia Poznań	3,157
